= 2023 UCI Track Champions League =

Track cycling competition

- Third edition of the UCI Track Champions League

Details
- Dates: 21 October – 11 November 2023
- Location: Europe
- Races: 5

The 2023 UCI Track Champions League was the third edition of the UCI Track Champions League, a track cycling competition held over five rounds in October and November 2023.

Titles were awarded in two categories – Endurance and Sprint – for women and men; the women's titles were won by Ellesse Andrews (Sprint) and Katie Archibald (Endurance), while the men's titles were won by Harrie Lavreysen (Sprint) and Dylan Bibic (Endurance).

== Events ==
This season of the UCI Track Champions League consisted of five rounds. Each round had two races per category (Sprint and Endurance), both for men and for women, meaning there was a total of 40 races held across the season. The Sprint category consisted of individual sprint and keirin races, while the Endurance category consisted of scratch and elimination races.

Events
| Round | Date | Venue | Location |
|---|---|---|---|
| 1 | 21 October | (Spain) Velòdrom Illes Balears | Palma de Mallorca |
| 2 | 28 October | (Germany) Berlin Velodrom | Berlin |
| 3 | 4 November | (France) Vélodrome National | Paris |
| 4 | 10 November | (United Kingdom) Lee Valley VeloPark | London |
| 5 | 11 November | (United Kingdom) Lee Valley VeloPark | London |

== Points standings ==
=== Scoring system ===
Points were awarded to the top fifteen riders, with twenty points being awarded to each race winner. In the case of a tie on points, a countback system was used where the highest most recent race result determined the final positions. The leader of each classification was denoted by a light blue jersey.

| Position | 1st | 2nd | 3rd | 4th | 5th | 6th | 7th | 8th | 9th | 10th | 11th | 12th | 13th | 14th | 15th | 16th–18th |
|---|---|---|---|---|---|---|---|---|---|---|---|---|---|---|---|---|
| Points | 20 | 17 | 15 | 13 | 11 | 10 | 9 | 8 | 7 | 6 | 5 | 4 | 3 | 2 | 1 | 0 |

=== Sprint ===
| Location | Event | Winner | Second | Third | Overall leader |
|---|---|---|---|---|---|
| Palma | Keirin | (Netherlands) Harrie Lavreysen | (Colombia) Kevin Quintero | (Australia) Matthew Richardson | (Netherlands) Harrie Lavreysen |
| Palma | Sprint | (Netherlands) Harrie Lavreysen | (France) Tom Derache | (Poland) Mateusz Rudyk | (Netherlands) Harrie Lavreysen |
| Berlin | Keirin | (Netherlands) Harrie Lavreysen | (Australia) Matthew Richardson | (France) Tom Derache | (Netherlands) Harrie Lavreysen |
| Berlin | Sprint | (Netherlands) Harrie Lavreysen | (Poland) Mateusz Rudyk | (Australia) Matthew Richardson | (Netherlands) Harrie Lavreysen |
| Paris | Keirin | (Netherlands) Harrie Lavreysen | (Poland) Mateusz Rudyk | (Australia) Matthew Richardson | (Netherlands) Harrie Lavreysen |
| Paris | Sprint | (Australia) Matthew Richardson | (Netherlands) Harrie Lavreysen | (Poland) Mateusz Rudyk | (Netherlands) Harrie Lavreysen |
| London (I) | Keirin | (Colombia) Kevin Quintero | (Netherlands) Harrie Lavreysen | (Australia) Matthew Richardson | (Netherlands) Harrie Lavreysen |
| London (I) | Sprint | (Netherlands) Harrie Lavreysen | (Australia) Matthew Richardson | (Poland) Mateusz Rudyk | (Netherlands) Harrie Lavreysen |
| London (II) | Keirin | (Netherlands) Harrie Lavreysen | (Australia) Matthew Richardson | (Poland) Mateusz Rudyk | (Netherlands) Harrie Lavreysen |
| London (II) | Sprint | (Australia) Matthew Richardson | (Netherlands) Harrie Lavreysen | (New Zealand) Callum Saunders | (Netherlands) Harrie Lavreysen |

Final standings
| Pos. | Rider | PAL (Spain) | | BER (Germany) | | PAR (France) | | LON (United Kingdom) | | LON2 (United Kingdom) | | Points |
| Pos. | Rider | K | S | K | S | K | S | K | S | K | S | Points |
|---|---|---|---|---|---|---|---|---|---|---|---|---|
| 1 | (Netherlands) Harrie Lavreysen | 1 | 1 | 1 | 1 | 1 | 2 | 2 | 1 | 1 | 2 | 191 |
| 2 | (Australia) Matthew Richardson | 3 | 5 | 2 | 3 | 3 | 1 | 3 | 2 | 2 | 1 | 162 |
| 3 | (Poland) Mateusz Rudyk | 10 | 3 | 4 | 2 | 2 | 3 | 6 | 3 | 3 | 5 | 134 |
| 4 | (France) Tom Derache | 4 | 2 | 3 | 5 | 14 | 7 | 4 | 12 | 16 | 7 | 93 |
| 5 | (New Zealand) Sam Dakin | 9 | 15 | 6 | 13 | 9 | 4 | 5 | 8 | 6 | 4 | 81 |
| 6 | (Colombia) Kevin Quintero | 2 | 13 | DNS | DNS | 4 | 12 | 1 | 4 | 11 | 11 | 80 |
| 7 | (United Kingdom) Joseph Truman | 11 | 4 | 10 | 15 | 8 | 5 | 13 | 5 | 5 | 8 | 77 |
| 8 | (New Zealand) Callum Saunders | 13 | 11 | 7 | 4 | 11 | 6 | 10 | 7 | 14 | 3 | 77 |
| 9 | (Lithuania) Vasilijus Lendel | 5 | 14 | 8 | 11 | 10 | 10 | 7 | 13 | 4 | 13 | 66 |
| 10 | (Israel) Mikhail Iakovlev | 17 | 7 | 5 | 6 | 15 | 15 | 9 | 6 | 10 | 16 | 55 |
| 11 | (South Africa) Jean Spies | 12 | 10 | 17 | 9 | 6 | 17 | 11 | 9 | 6 | 18 | 49 |
| 12 | (France) Melvin Landerneau | 8 | 16 | 13 | 8 | 7 | 14 | 12 | 14 | 13 | 9 | 46 |
| 13 | (Netherlands) Daan Kool | 18 | 18 | 9 | 16 | 5 | 9 | 17 | 10 | 7 | 15 | 41 |
| 14 | (Netherlands) Tijmen van Loon | 6 | 9 | 16 | 7 | 17 | 13 | 15 | 18 | 9 | 14 | 39 |
| 15 | (Chinese Taipei) Nien Hsing Hsieh | 7 | 17 | 14 | 12 | 12 | 16 | 8 | 16 | 17 | 6 | 37 |
| 16 | (Netherlands) Lars Romijn | 16 | 6 | 11 | 10 | 16 | 11 | 14 | 17 | 15 | 12 | 33 |
| 17 | (India) Esow Alben | 14 | 8 | 15 | 17 | 13 | 8 | 18 | 11 | 12 | 17 | 31 |
| 18 | (India) Ronaldo Laitonjam | 15 | 12 | 12 | 14 | DNS | DNS | 16 | 15 | 18 | 10 | 18 |

=== Endurance ===
| Location | Event | Winner | Second | Third | Overall leader |
|---|---|---|---|---|---|
| Palma | Elimination | (Canada) Dylan Bibic | (United Kingdom) William Tidball | (Belgium) Jules Hesters | (Canada) Dylan Bibic |
| Palma | Scratch | (Japan) Eiya Hashimoto | (United Kingdom) Mark Stewart | (Belgium) Tuur Dens | (Japan) Eiya Hashimoto |
| Berlin | Elimination | (Belgium) Jules Hesters | (Japan) Eiya Hashimoto | (United Kingdom) William Tidball | (Japan) Eiya Hashimoto |
| Berlin | Scratch | (Canada) Dylan Bibic | (Austria) Maximilian Schmidbauer | (Denmark) Tobias Hansen | (Japan) Eiya Hashimoto |
| Paris | Elimination | (Canada) Dylan Bibic | (Belgium) Jules Hesters | (Spain) Sebastián Mora | (Canada) Dylan Bibic |
| Paris | Scratch | (Canada) Dylan Bibic | (Canada) Mathias Guillemette | (Belgium) Tuur Dens | (Canada) Dylan Bibic |
| London (I) | Elimination | (United Kingdom) William Tidball | (Belgium) Jules Hesters | (Spain) Sebastian Mora | (Canada) Dylan Bibic |
| London (I) | Scratch | (Netherlands) Roy Eefting | (Canada) Dylan Bibic | (Denmark) Tobias Hansen | (Canada) Dylan Bibic |
| London (II) | Elimination | (Belgium) Tuur Dens | (Belgium) Jules Hesters | (Netherlands) Philip Heijnen | (Canada) Dylan Bibic |
| London (II) | Scratch | (United Kingdom) Mark Stewart | (United Kingdom) William Perrett | (Spain) Sebastian Mora | (Canada) Dylan Bibic |

Final standings
| Pos. | Rider | PAL (Spain) | | BER (Germany) | | PAR (France) | | LON (United Kingdom) | | LON2 (United Kingdom) | | Points |
| Pos. | Rider | E | S | E | S | E | S | E | S | E | S | Points |
|---|---|---|---|---|---|---|---|---|---|---|---|---|
| 1 | (Canada) Dylan Bibic | 1 | 11 | 5 | 1 | 1 | 1 | 13 | 2 | 11 | 6 | 131 |
| 2 | (United Kingdom) William Tidball | 2 | 13 | 3 | 7 | 6 | 4 | 1 | 4 | 5 | 10 | 117 |
| 3 | (Belgium) Jules Hesters | 3 | 14 | 1 | 11 | 2 | 5 | 2 | 10 | 2 | 13 | 113 |
| 4 | (United Kingdom) Mark Stewart | 12 | 2 | 10 | 6 | 4 | 7 | 9 | 11 | 4 | 1 | 104 |
| 5 | (Netherlands) Philip Heijnen | 6 | 8 | 8 | 8 | 5 | 12 | 4 | 6 | 3 | 4 | 100 |
| 6 | (Japan) Eiya Hashimoto | 5 | 1 | 2 | 5 | 17 | 6 | 10 | 5 | 16 | 9 | 93 |
| 7 | (Denmark) Tobias Hansen | 11 | 17 | 6 | 3 | 8 | 8 | 6 | 3 | 7 | 5 | 91 |
| 8 | (Belgium) Tuur Dens | 7 | 3 | 15 | 17 | 12 | 3 | 8 | 8 | 1 | 7 | 89 |
| 9 | (Spain) Sebastián Mora | 4 | 7 | DNS | DNS | 3 | 11 | 3 | 7 | 8 | 3 | 89 |
| 10 | (Canada) Mathias Guillemette | 8 | 9 | 16 | 9 | 7 | 2 | 15 | 9 | 12 | 12 | 64 |
| 11 | (Netherlands) Roy Eefting | 15 | 10 | 14 | 4 | 15 | 16 | 17 | 1 | 9 | 8 | 58 |
| 12 | (United Kingdom) William Perrett | 9 | 4 | 17 | 13 | 11 | 15 | 12 | 14 | 17 | 2 | 52 |
| 13 | (United States) Gavin Hoover | 16 | 18 | 7 | 10 | 9 | 9 | 5 | 12 | 13 | 15 | 48 |
| 14 | (Austria) Maximilian Schmidbauer | 14 | 5 | 13 | 2 | 16 | 14 | 11 | 15 | 14 | 16 | 43 |
| 15 | (Germany) Theo Reinhardt | 17 | 15 | 9 | 14 | 14 | 13 | 7 | 13 | 6 | 14 | 39 |
| 16 | (Netherlands) Matthijs Büchli | 13 | 16 | 4 | 12 | 10 | 10 | DNS | DNS | DNS | DNS | 32 |
| 17 | (Switzerland) Claudio Imhof | 10 | 6 | 11 | 15 | DNS | DNS | 16 | 17 | 10 | 17 | 28 |
| 18 | (France) Quentin Lafargue | 18 | 12 | 12 | 16 | 13 | 17 | 14 | 16 | 15 | 11 | 19 |

=== Sprint ===
| Location | Event | Winner | Second | Third | Overall leader |
|---|---|---|---|---|---|
| Palma | Keirin | (New Zealand) Ellesse Andrews | (Colombia) Martha Bayona | (Germany) Alessa-Catriona Pröpster | (New Zealand) Ellesse Andrews |
| Palma | Sprint | (Germany) Alessa-Catriona Pröpster | (United Kingdom) Emma Finucane | (Colombia) Martha Bayona | (Germany) Alessa-Catriona Pröpster |
| Berlin | Keirin | (New Zealand) Ellesse Andrews | (Germany) Alessa-Catriona Pröpster | (United Kingdom) Lowri Thomas | (Germany) Alessa-Catriona Pröpster |
| Berlin | Sprint | (New Zealand) Ellesse Andrews | (United Kingdom) Katy Marchant | (United Kingdom) Emma Finucane | (New Zealand) Ellesse Andrews |
| Paris | Keirin | (Germany) Alessa-Catriona Pröpster | (Belgium) Nicky Degrendele | (New Zealand) Ellesse Andrews | (New Zealand) Ellesse Andrews |
| Paris | Sprint | (New Zealand) Ellesse Andrews | (Canada) Kelsey Mitchell | (Colombia) Martha Bayona | (New Zealand) Ellesse Andrews |
| London (I) | Keirin | (Colombia) Martha Bayona | (New Zealand) Ellesse Andrews | (United Kingdom) Emma Finucane | (New Zealand) Ellesse Andrews |
| London (I) | Sprint | (Germany) Alessa-Catriona Pröpster | (United Kingdom) Katy Marchant | (United Kingdom) Emma Finucane | (New Zealand) Ellesse Andrews |
| London (II) | Keirin | (New Zealand) Ellesse Andrews | (Colombia) Martha Bayona | (United Kingdom) Emma Finucane | (New Zealand) Ellesse Andrews |
| London (II) | Sprint | (New Zealand) Ellesse Andrews | (Colombia) Martha Bayona | (Germany) Alessa-Catriona Pröpster | (New Zealand) Ellesse Andrews |

Final standings
| Pos. | Rider | PAL (Spain) | | BER (Germany) | | PAR (France) | | LON (United Kingdom) | | LON2 (United Kingdom) | | Points |
| Pos. | Rider | K | S | K | S | K | S | K | S | K | S | Points |
|---|---|---|---|---|---|---|---|---|---|---|---|---|
| 1 | (New Zealand) Ellesse Andrews | 1 | 6 | 1 | 1 | 3 | 1 | 2 | 5 | 1 | 1 | 173 |
| 2 | (Germany) Alessa-Catriona Pröpster | 3 | 1 | 2 | 4 | 1 | 5 | 6 | 1 | 4 | 3 | 154 |
| 3 | (Colombia) Martha Bayona | 2 | 3 | DNS | DNS | 4 | 3 | 1 | 4 | 2 | 2 | 127 |
| 4 | (United Kingdom) Emma Finucane | 9 | 2 | 8 | 3 | 6 | 10 | 3 | 3 | 3 | 10 | 114 |
| 5 | (China) Lijuan Wang | 10 | 7 | 9 | 6 | REL | 4 | 4 | 7 | 7 | 4 | 89 |
| 6 | (Belgium) Nicky Degrendele | 5 | 11 | 4 | 11 | 2 | 6 | 9 | 11 | 12 | 5 | 88 |
| 7 | (United Kingdom) Katy Marchant | 11 | 8 | 13 | 2 | 15 | 8 | 8 | 2 | 8 | 7 | 84 |
| 8 | (Canada) Kelsey Mitchell | 6 | 5 | 7 | 7 | 12 | 2 | 13 | 12 | 13 | 15 | 71 |
| 9 | (Italy) Miriam Vece | 17 | 9 | 5 | 8 | 13 | 9 | 11 | 8 | 6 | 9 | 66 |
| 10 | (Canada) Lauriane Genest | 4 | 12 | 10 | 9 | 10 | 16 | 7 | 16 | 5 | 8 | 64 |
| 11 | (United Kingdom) Sophie Capewell | 13 | 4 | 6 | 16 | 7 | 7 | 15 | 9 | 11 | 11 | 62 |
| 12 | (United Kingdom) Lowri Thomas | 15 | 10 | 3 | 5 | 5 | 13 | 12 | 10 | 15 | 12 | 62 |
| 13 | (Mexico) Daniela Gaxiola | DNS | DNF | 12 | 10 | 8 | 12 | 5 | 6 | 10 | 6 | 59 |
| 14 | (Republic of Ireland) Orla Walsh | 7 | 13 | 17 | 12 | 11 | 17 | 14 | 15 | 9 | 16 | 31 |
| 15 | (Ukraine) Alla Biletska | 8 | 16 | 15 | 15 | 16 | 15 | 10 | 13 | 14 | 13 | 25 |
| 16 | (Lithuania) Migle Lendel | 12 | 17 | 11 | 13 | 9 | 11 | DNS | DNS | 18 | DNS | 24 |
| 17 | (United Kingdom) Ellie Stone | 14 | 14 | 16 | 14 | 17 | 14 | 17 | 14 | 17 | 14 | 12 |
| 18 | (Netherlands) Ruby Huisman | 16 | 15 | 14 | 17 | 14 | 18 | 16 | 17 | 16 | 17 | 5 |

=== Endurance ===
| Location | Event | Winner | Second | Third | Overall leader |
|---|---|---|---|---|---|
| Palma | Elimination | (United Kingdom) Katie Archibald | (Norway) Anita Stenberg | (United States) Lily Williams | (United Kingdom) Katie Archibald |
| Palma | Scratch | (United States) Lily Williams | (United Kingdom) Katie Archibald | (Canada) Maggie Coles-Lyster | (United Kingdom) Katie Archibald |
| Berlin | Elimination | (United Kingdom) Katie Archibald | (Canada) Maggie Coles-Lyster | (Norway) Anita Stenberg | (United Kingdom) Katie Archibald |
| Berlin | Scratch | (United States) Lily Williams | (Canada) Sarah van Dam | (Norway) Anita Stenberg | (United Kingdom) Katie Archibald |
| Paris | Elimination | (United Kingdom) Katie Archibald | (Norway) Anita Stenberg | (Republic of Ireland) Lara Gillespie | (United Kingdom) Katie Archibald |
| Paris | Scratch | (Canada) Sarah van Dam | (Canada) Maggie Coles-Lyster | (United Kingdom) Katie Archibald | (United Kingdom) Katie Archibald |
| London (I) | Elimination | (United Kingdom) Katie Archibald | (Norway) Anita Stenberg | (Republic of Ireland) Lara Gillespie | (United Kingdom) Katie Archibald |
| London (I) | Scratch | (United Kingdom) Dannielle Khan | (United States) Lily Williams | (United Kingdom) Sophie Lewis | (United Kingdom) Katie Archibald |
| London (II) | Elimination | (Republic of Ireland) Lara Gillespie | (Norway) Anita Stenberg | (United Kingdom) Katie Archibald | (United Kingdom) Katie Archibald |
| London (II) | Scratch | (United Kingdom) Neah Evans | (Republic of Ireland) Lara Gillespie | (Lithuania) Olivija Baleisyte | (United Kingdom) Katie Archibald |

Final standings
| Pos. | Rider | PAL (Spain) | | BER (Germany) | | PAR (France) | | LON (United Kingdom) | | LON2 (United Kingdom) | | Points |
| Pos. | Rider | E | S | E | S | E | S | E | S | E | S | Points |
|---|---|---|---|---|---|---|---|---|---|---|---|---|
| 1 | (United Kingdom) Katie Archibald | 1 | 2 | 1 | 6 | 1 | 3 | 1 | 6 | 3 | 4 | 160 |
| 2 | (Norway) Anita Stenberg | 2 | 4 | 3 | 3 | 2 | 4 | 2 | 4 | 2 | 8 | 145 |
| 3 | (United States) Lily Williams | 3 | 1 | 10 | 1 | 4 | 9 | 7 | 2 | 5 | 6 | 128 |
| 4 | (Republic of Ireland) Lara Gillespie | 7 | 13 | 4 | 4 | 3 | 7 | 3 | 7 | 1 | 2 | 123 |
| 5 | (Canada) Maggie Coles-Lyster | 4 | 3 | 2 | 5 | 7 | 2 | 6 | 5 | 9 | 5 | 121 |
| 6 | (Canada) Sarah van Dam | 8 | 12 | 7 | 2 | 8 | 1 | 4 | 12 | 8 | 7 | 100 |
| 7 | (United Kingdom) Dannielle Khan | 6 | 5 | 12 | 7 | 11 | 5 | 10 | 1 | 11 | 11 | 86 |
| 8 | (Czech Republic) Petra Sevcikova | 5 | 10 | 5 | 9 | 5 | 6 | 8 | 10 | 4 | 15 | 84 |
| 9 | (United Kingdom) Neah Evans | 9 | 7 | 8 | 12 | DNS | DNS | 5 | 8 | 7 | 1 | 76 |
| 10 | (Lithuania) Olivija Baleisyte | 10 | 9 | 9 | 10 | 6 | 13 | 14 | 11 | 6 | 3 | 71 |
| 11 | (United Kingdom) Sophie Lewis | 12 | 11 | 6 | 11 | 9 | 8 | =15 | 3 | 10 | 9 | 68 |
| 12 | (United Kingdom) Kate Richardson | 11 | 6 | 17 | 8 | 15 | 15 | =15 | 9 | 14 | 10 | 41 |
| 13 | (Belgium) Hélène Hesters | 18 | 14 | 11 | 13 | 12 | 10 | 9 | 14 | 16 | 12 | 33 |
| 14 | (New Zealand) Emma Cumming | 13 | 8 | 15 | 14 | 17 | 11 | 11 | 18 | 17 | 14 | 26 |
| 15 | (Denmark) Amalie Winther Olsen | 17 | 17 | 14 | 15 | 10 | 17 | 12 | 13 | 18 | 17 | 16 |
| 16 | (Italy) Francesca Selva | 15 | 18 | 13 | 16 | 14 | 14 | 17 | 15 | 13 | 18 | 12 |
| 17 | (Mexico) Antonieta Gaxiola | 16 | 15 | DNS | DNS | 13 | 12 | 13 | 16 | 15 | 16 | 12 |
| 18 | (Netherlands) Maaike Brandwagt | 14 | 16 | 16 | 17 | 16 | 16 | 18 | 17 | 12 | 13 | 9 |
