= 2024 UCI Track Champions League =

Track cycling competition

- Fourth edition of the UCI Track Champions League

Details
- Dates: 23 November – 7 December 2024
- Location: Europe
- Races: 5

The 2024 UCI Track Champions League was the fourth edition of the UCI Track Champions League, a track cycling competition held over five rounds in November and December 2024. This was the last edition of the competition, as it was cancelled in March 2025.

Titles were awarded in two categories – Endurance and Sprint – for women and men; the women's titles were won by Alina Lysenko (Sprint) and Katie Archibald (Endurance), while the men's titles were won by Harrie Lavreysen (Sprint) and Dylan Bibic (Endurance).

== Events ==
=== Format ===
This season of the UCI Track Champions League consisted of five rounds. Each round had two races per category (Sprint and Endurance), both for men and for women, making a total of 40 races. The Sprint category consisted of individual sprint and keirin races, while the Endurance category consisted of scratch and elimination races.

=== Calendar ===
Round	Date	Venue	Location
1	23 November	(France) Vélodrome National	Paris
2	29 November	(Netherlands) Omnisport Apeldoorn	Apeldoorn
3	30 November	(Netherlands) Omnisport Apeldoorn	Apeldoorn
4	6 December	(United Kingdom) Lee Valley VeloPark	London
5	7 December	(United Kingdom) Lee Valley VeloPark	London

=== Crash in Round 5 ===
At the final round in London, during the second heat of the women's keirin, two of the riders – Katy Marchant and Alessa-Catriona Pröpster – collided at high speed and crashed over the barriers, into the crowd. The organisers of the event, including WBD Sports, British Cycling, the UCI, and the venue (Lee Valley VeloPark) took the decision to cancel the remainder of the evening's races. Both riders and four spectators were treated by medics at the venue. Marchant was taken to hospital, and it was later confirmed that she had fractured her forearm and dislocated two fingers.

The races cancelled were the men's keirin, women's keirin, and men's elimination race; no points were awarded for any of these events.

== Points standings ==
=== Scoring system ===
Points were awarded to the top fifteen riders, with twenty points being awarded to each race winner. In the case of a tie on points, a countback system was used where the highest most recent race result determined the final positions. The leader of each classification is denoted by a light blue jersey.

Position	1st	2nd	3rd	4th	5th	6th	7th	8th	9th	10th	11th	12th	13th	14th	15th	16th–18th
Points	20	17	15	13	11	10	9	8	7	6	5	4	3	2	1	0

=== Men ===
==== Sprint ====
Location	Event	Winner	Second	Third	Overall leader
Paris	Sprint	(United Kingdom) Matthew Richardson	(Netherlands) Harrie Lavreysen	(Trinidad and Tobago) Nicholas Paul	(United Kingdom) Matthew Richardson
Paris	Keirin	(United Kingdom) Matthew Richardson	(Netherlands) Harrie Lavreysen	(Colombia) Kevin Quintero	(United Kingdom) Matthew Richardson
Apeldoorn I	Sprint	(Netherlands) Harrie Lavreysen	(Trinidad and Tobago) Nicholas Paul	(Netherlands) Jeffrey Hoogland	(Netherlands) Harrie Lavreysen
Apeldoorn I	Keirin	(Colombia) Cristian Ortega	(Netherlands) Harrie Lavreysen	(Trinidad and Tobago) Nicholas Paul	(Netherlands) Harrie Lavreysen
Apeldoorn II	Sprint	(Netherlands) Harrie Lavreysen	(United Kingdom) Matthew Richardson	(France) Rayan Helal	(Netherlands) Harrie Lavreysen
Apeldoorn II	Keirin	(United Kingdom) Matthew Richardson	(Colombia) Cristian Ortega	(Netherlands) Harrie Lavreysen	(Netherlands) Harrie Lavreysen
London I	Sprint	(Netherlands) Harrie Lavreysen	(United Kingdom) Matthew Richardson	(Netherlands) Jeffrey Hoogland	(Netherlands) Harrie Lavreysen
London I	Keirin	(Netherlands) Harrie Lavreysen	(Colombia) Cristian Ortega	(United Kingdom) Matthew Richardson	(Netherlands) Harrie Lavreysen
London II	Sprint	(Netherlands) Harrie Lavreysen	(Australia) Leigh Hoffman	(Netherlands) Jeffrey Hoogland	(Netherlands) Harrie Lavreysen
London II	Keirin	Cancelled due to earlier collision			

Final standings
Pos.	Rider	PAR (France)		APE (Netherlands)		APE2 (Netherlands)		LON (United Kingdom)		LON2 (United Kingdom)		Points
Pos.	Rider	S	K	S	K	S	K	S	K	S	K	Points
1	(Netherlands) Harrie Lavreysen	2	2	1	2	1	3	1	1	1	Not held	166
2	(United Kingdom) Matthew Richardson	1	1	5	4	2	1	2	3	4	Not held	146
3	(Colombia) Cristian Ortega	5	4	4	1	6	2	5	2	13	Not held	115
4	(Australia) Leigh Hoffman	4	13	6	15	4	4	4	4	2	Not held	96
5	(Trinidad and Tobago) Nicholas Paul	3	5	2	3	7	5	14	14	5	Not held	93
6	(Netherlands) Jeffrey Hoogland	6	7	3	7	16	6	3	9	3	Not held	90
7	(Australia) Thomas Cornish	8	10	11	10	10	8	6	6	12	Not held	63
8	(Poland) Mateusz Rudyk	14	6	12	6	9	7	12	7	14	Not held	57
9	(Suriname) Jair Tjon En Fa	11	8	16	5	5	15	9	5	15	Not held	55
10	(France) Rayan Helal	13	18	10	12	3	10	8	8	17	Not held	50
11	(Israel) Mikhail Yakovlev	7	12	9	13	17	12	10	13	7	Not held	45
12	(Malaysia) Muhammad Shah Firdaus	12	11	17	8	11	14	11	15	8	Not held	38
13	(New Zealand) Sam Dakin	9	9	15	9	15	16	18	10	11	Not held	34
14	(United Kingdom) Harry Ledingham-Horn	12	11	8	16	18	18	13	12	9	Not held	30
15	(Colombia) Kevin Quintero	18	3	13	14	14	13	16	11	16	Not held	30
16	(Australia) Tayte Ryan	15	16	7	11	8	11	15	16	18	Not held	29
17	(Lithuania) Vasilijus Lendel	17	15	18	17	12	17	7	18	6	Not held	24
18	(Germany) Luca Spiegel	16	17	14	18	13	9	17	17	10	Not held	18

==== Endurance ====
Location	Event	Winner	Second	Third	Overall leader
Paris	Scratch	(Canada) Dylan Bibic	(France) Clément Petit	(New Zealand) Keegan Hornblow	(Canada) Dylan Bibic
Paris	Elimination	(United Kingdom) William Perrett	(France) Oscar Nilsson-Julien	(Belgium) Lindsay De Vylder	(Canada) Dylan Bibic
Apeldoorn I	Scratch	(Denmark) Tobias Hansen	(Canada) Dylan Bibic	(Belgium) Lindsay De Vylder	(Canada) Dylan Bibic
Apeldoorn I	Elimination	(Canada) Dylan Bibic	(Denmark) Tobias Hansen	(Australia) Blake Agnoletto	(Canada) Dylan Bibic
Apeldoorn II	Scratch	(United States) Peter Moore	(France) Oscar Nilsson-Julien	(United Kingdom) William Tidball	(Canada) Dylan Bibic
Apeldoorn II	Elimination	(Denmark) Tobias Hansen	(Canada) Dylan Bibic	(Australia) Blake Agnoletto	(Canada) Dylan Bibic
London I	Scratch	(United States) Peter Moore	(Switzerland) Alex Vogel	(Netherlands) Philip Heijnen	(Canada) Dylan Bibic
London I	Elimination	(Canada) Dylan Bibic	(Belgium) Lindsay De Vylder	(Australia) Blake Agnoletto	(Canada) Dylan Bibic
London II	Scratch	(Belgium) Lindsay De Vylder	(New Zealand) Keegan Hornblow	(Switzerland) Alex Vogel	(Canada) Dylan Bibic
London II	Elimination	Cancelled due to earlier collision			

Final standings
Pos.	Rider	PAR (France)		APE (Netherlands)		APE2 (Netherlands)		LON (United Kingdom)		LON2 (United Kingdom)		Points
Pos.	Rider	S	E	S	E	S	E	S	E	S	E	Points
1	(Canada) Dylan Bibic	1	4	2	1	9	2	10	1	6	Not held	130
2	(Denmark) Tobias Hansen	6	7	1	2	7	1	11	4	9	Not held	110
3	(Belgium) Lindsay De Vylder	11	3	3	7	6	7	12	2	1	Not held	104
4	(France) Oscar Nilsson-Julien	8	2	10	6	2	16	4	6	5	Not held	90
5	(New Zealand) Keegan Hornblow	3	12	7	16	4	6	7	8	2	Not held	85
6	(France) Oscar Nilsson-Julien	8	2	10	6	2	16	4	6	12	Not held	85
7	(Australia) Blake Agnoletto	10	6	8	3	13	3	9	3	11	Not held	84
8	(Switzerland) Alex Vogel	5	17	11	14	5	12	2	12	3	Not held	69
9	(Poland) Filip Prokopyszyn	9	9	4	11	11	5	5	14	10	Not held	67
10	(Netherlands) Philip Heijnen	12	5	12	5	12	10	3	16	8	Not held	63
11	(United States) Peter Moore	16	11	15	15	1	13	1	7	13	Not held	62
12	(France) Clément Petit	2	14	9	12	14	15	8	9	7	Not held	57
13	(United Kingdom) William Perrett	13	1	14	10	10	14	13	15	4	Not held	56
14	(Austria) Tim Wafler	14	8	6	9	8	9	14	10	15	Not held	51
15	(Netherlands) Roy Eefting-Bloem	7	15	13	8	15	11	15	13	14	Not held	33
16	(United States) Grant Koontz	4	13	16	13	Withdrew due to injury					Not held	19
17	(Switzerland) Claudio Imhof	15	16	17	17	16	8	16	11	16	Not held	14

=== Women ===
==== Sprint ====
Location	Event	Winner	Second	Third	Overall leader
Paris	Sprint	(United Kingdom) Emma Finucane	(Colombia) Martha Bayona	Alina Lysenko	(United Kingdom) Emma Finucane
Paris	Keirin	Alina Lysenko	(United Kingdom) Emma Finucane	(Netherlands) Steffie van der Peet	(United Kingdom) Emma Finucane
Apeldoorn I	Sprint	Alina Lysenko	(New Zealand) Ellesse Andrews	(Colombia) Martha Bayona	Alina Lysenko
Apeldoorn I	Keirin	Alina Lysenko	(New Zealand) Ellesse Andrews	(Colombia) Martha Bayona	Alina Lysenko
Apeldoorn II	Sprint	Alina Lysenko	(Colombia) Martha Bayona	(Italy) Miriam Vece	Alina Lysenko
Apeldoorn II	Keirin	Alina Lysenko	(Netherlands) Steffie van der Peet	(France) Mathilde Gros	Alina Lysenko
London I	Sprint	(United Kingdom) Emma Finucane	(New Zealand) Ellesse Andrews	(United Kingdom) Sophie Capewell	Alina Lysenko
London I	Keirin	Alina Lysenko	(United Kingdom) Emma Finucane	(Colombia) Martha Bayona	Alina Lysenko
London II	Sprint	(United Kingdom) Emma Finucane	Alina Lysenko	(New Zealand) Ellesse Andrews	Alina Lysenko
London II	Keirin	Cancelled due to collision			

Final standings
Pos.	Rider	PAR (France)		APE (Netherlands)		APE2 (Netherlands)		LON (United Kingdom)		LON2 (United Kingdom)		Points
Pos.	Rider	S	K	S	K	S	K	S	K	S	K	Points
1	Alina Lysenko	3	1	1	1	1	1	11	1	2	Not held	140
2	(United Kingdom) Emma Finucane	1	2	4	11	7	14	1	2	1	Not held	123
3	(Colombia) Martha Bayona	2	4	3	3	2	7	7	3	6	Not held	120
4	(New Zealand) Ellesse Andrews	5	10	2	2	5	5	2	4	3	Not held	118
5	(Netherlands) Steffie van der Peet	8	3	5	4	6	2	6	5	5	Not held	106
6	(United Kingdom) Katy Marchant	4	17	7	5	4	12	5	12	4	Not held	78
7	(United Kingdom) Sophie Capewell	14	6	15	9	10	9	3	7	7	Not held	66
8	(Australia) Kristina Clonan	6	15	8	6	8	8	8	8	14	Not held	63
9	(Italy) Miriam Vece	10	11	11	13	3	6	9	14	10	Not held	59
10	(France) Mathilde Gros	7	5	6	16	16	3	15	16	12	Not held	50
11	(Netherlands) Hetty van de Wouw	11	9	10	17	11	13	10	6	11	Not held	47
12	(Mexico) Daniela Gaxiola	15	8	12	14	12	10	16	10	8	Not held	39
13	(New Zealand) Shaane Fulton	17	16	9	7	13	11	12	15	9	Not held	36
14	(Germany) Alessa-Catriona Pröpster	9	13	16	10	15	17	4	17	13	Not held	33
15	(Colombia) Stefany Cuadrado	16	7	17	15	14	4	14	13	17	Not held	30
16	(New Zealand) Rebecca Petch	13	18	13	12	9	15	17	9	15	Not held	26
17	(Ukraine) Alla Biletska	12	14	14	8	17	16	13	11	16	Not held	24
18	(Belgium) Nicky Degrendele	18	12	Withdrew due to injury							Not held	4

==== Endurance ====
Location	Event	Winner	Second	Third	Overall leader
Paris	Scratch	(United Kingdom) Katie Archibald	(Norway) Anita Stenberg	(Republic of Ireland) Mia Griffin	(United Kingdom) Katie Archibald
Paris	Elimination	(United Kingdom) Katie Archibald	(Mexico) Yareli Acevedo	(United Kingdom) Neah Evans	(United Kingdom) Katie Archibald
Apeldoorn I	Scratch	(Canada) Sarah Van Dam	(United Kingdom) Katie Archibald	(Republic of Ireland) Mia Griffin	(United Kingdom) Katie Archibald
Apeldoorn I	Elimination	(Norway) Anita Stenberg	(United Kingdom) Katie Archibald	(Republic of Ireland) Lara Gillespie	(United Kingdom) Katie Archibald
Apeldoorn II	Scratch	(Czech Republic) Petra Ševčíková	(Republic of Ireland) Lara Gillespie	(Canada) Sarah Van Dam	(United Kingdom) Katie Archibald
Apeldoorn II	Elimination	(United Kingdom) Katie Archibald	(Mexico) Yareli Acevedo	(Czech Republic) Petra Ševčíková	(United Kingdom) Katie Archibald
London I	Scratch	(Norway) Anita Stenberg	(United Kingdom) Katie Archibald	(Switzerland) Cybèle Schneider	(United Kingdom) Katie Archibald
London I	Elimination	(Republic of Ireland) Lara Gillespie	(Canada) Sarah Van Dam	(Norway) Anita Stenberg	(United Kingdom) Katie Archibald
London II	Scratch	(United Kingdom) Katie Archibald	(Norway) Anita Stenberg	(Republic of Ireland) Lara Gillespie	(United Kingdom) Katie Archibald
London II	Elimination	(Mexico) Yareli Acevedo	(United Kingdom) Katie Archibald	(Republic of Ireland) Lara Gillespie	(United Kingdom) Katie Archibald

Final standings
Pos.	Rider	PAR (France)		APE (Netherlands)		APE2 (Netherlands)		LON (United Kingdom)		LON2 (United Kingdom)		Points
Pos.	Rider	S	E	S	E	S	E	S	E	S	E	Points
1	(United Kingdom) Katie Archibald	1	1	2	2	12	1	2	9	1	2	159
2	(Norway) Anita Stenberg	2	9	16	1	10	9	1	3	2	5	120
3	(Republic of Ireland) Lara Gillespie	8	4	11	3	2	13	15	1	3	3	112
4	(Canada) Sarah Van Dam	4	8	1	12	3	5	8	2	9	14	105
5	(United Kingdom) Anna Morris	5	6	12	7	6	4	4	6	11	4	98
6	(Mexico) Yareli Acevedo	6	2	17	17	9	2	12	5	8	1	94
7	(Czech Republic) Petra Ševčíková	13	7	9	4	1	3	14	15	6	6	90
8	(New Zealand) Samantha Donnelly	9	14	5	6	7	8	13	4	4	7	85
9	(Lithuania) Olivija Baleišytė	17	5	4	8	5	6	5	13	7	8	84
10	(Republic of Ireland) Mia Griffin	3	13	3	14	8	11	9	17	12	12	63
11	(United Kingdom) Neah Evans	10	3	6	10	14	18	6	12	14	15	56
12	(Norway) Nora Tveit	14	12	14	5	17	7	18	7	5	9	55
13	(Denmark) Ellen Klinge	7	10	15	11	13	12	7	8	18	11	50
14	(Switzerland) Cybèle Schneider	18	11	10	15	11	15	3	10	13	10	48
15	(Egypt) Ebtissam Mohamed	16	17	13	13	4	10	10	11	10	16	42
16	(United Kingdom) Jess Roberts	12	16	8	9	15	14	11	16	16	13	30
17	(Republic of Ireland) Erin Creighton	11	15	7	16	16	16	16	14	15	18	18
18	(Republic of Ireland) Lucy Bénézet Minns	15	18	18	18	18	17	17	18	17	17	1
