= 2022 UCI Track Champions League =

Track cycling competition

- Second edition of the UCI Track Champions League

Details
- Dates: 12 November – 3 December 2022
- Location: Europe
- Races: 5

The 2022 UCI Track Champions League was the second edition of the UCI Track Champions League, a track cycling competition held over four rounds in November and December 2022.

Titles were awarded in two categories – Endurance and Sprint – for women and men; the women's titles were won by Mathilde Gros (Sprint) and Jennifer Valente (Endurance), while the men's titles were won by Matthew Richardson (Sprint) and Claudio Imhof (Endurance).

== Events ==
Round	Date	Venue	Location
1	12 November	(Spain) Velòdrom Illes Balears	Palma de Mallorca
2	19 November	(Germany) Berlin Velodrom	Berlin
3	26 November	(France) Vélodrome National	Paris
4	2 December	(United Kingdom) Lee Valley VeloPark	London
5	3 December	(United Kingdom) Lee Valley VeloPark	London

== Points standings ==
=== Scoring system ===
Points were awarded to the top fifteen riders, with twenty points being awarded to each race winner. In the case of a tie on points, a countback system was used where the highest most recent race result determined the final positions. The leader of each classification was denoted by a light blue jersey.

Position	1st	2nd	3rd	4th	5th	6th	7th	8th	9th	10th	11th	12th	13th	14th	15th	16th–18th
Points	20	17	15	13	11	10	9	8	7	6	5	4	3	2	1	0

=== Sprint ===
Location	Event	Winner	Second	Third	Overall leader
Palma	Keirin	(Netherlands) Harrie Lavreysen	(Germany) Stefan Bötticher	(Australia) Matthew Richardson	(Netherlands) Harrie Lavreysen
Palma	Sprint	(Australia) Matthew Richardson	(Netherlands) Harrie Lavreysen	(Poland) Mateusz Rudyk	(Netherlands) Harrie Lavreysen
Berlin	Sprint	(Australia) Matthew Richardson	(Netherlands) Harrie Lavreysen	(Colombia) Kevin Quintero	(Australia) Matthew Richardson
Berlin	Keirin	(Netherlands) Harrie Lavreysen	(Australia) Matthew Richardson	(Germany) Stefan Bötticher	(Netherlands) Harrie Lavreysen
Paris	Sprint	(Netherlands) Harrie Lavreysen	(Australia) Matthew Richardson	(Germany) Stefan Bötticher	(Netherlands) Harrie Lavreysen
Paris	Keirin	(Australia) Matthew Richardson	(Netherlands) Harrie Lavreysen	(Japan) Shinji Nakano	(Netherlands) Harrie Lavreysen
London (I)	Keirin	(Australia) Matthew Richardson	(Colombia) Santiago Ramírez	(Germany) Stefan Bötticher	(Australia) Matthew Richardson
London (I)	Sprint	(Netherlands) Harrie Lavreysen	(Australia) Matthew Richardson	(Israel) Mikhail Iakovlev	(Australia) Matthew Richardson
London (II)	Sprint	(Netherlands) Harrie Lavreysen	(Australia) Matthew Richardson	(Netherlands) Jeffrey Hoogland	(Netherlands) Harrie Lavreysen
London (II)	Keirin	(Australia) Matthew Richardson	(Netherlands) Harrie Lavreysen	(Germany) Stefan Bötticher	(Australia) Matthew Richardson

Final standings
Pos.	Rider	PAL (Spain)		BER (Germany)		PAR (France)		LON (United Kingdom)		LON2 (United Kingdom)		Points
Pos.	Rider	K	S	S	K	S	K	K	S	S	K	Points
1	(Australia) Matthew Richardson	3	1	1	2	2	1	1	2	2	1	183
2	(Netherlands) Harrie Lavreysen	1	2	2	1	1	2	4	1	1	2	181
3	(Germany) Stefan Bötticher	2	4	4	3	3	4	3	9	4	3	136
4	(Colombia) Kevin Quintero	12	6	3	6	6	13	6	5	6	7	92
5	(Colombia) Santiago Ramírez	4	9	5	8	12	7	2	7	5	17	89
6	(Netherlands) Jeffrey Hoogland	11	11	10	14	13	5	7	4	3	4	82
7	(Thailand) Jai Angsuthasawit	7	14	13	10	4	6	8	11	8	9	71
8	(Malaysia) Azizulhasni Awang	15	7	11	11	5	9	17	12	9	5	60
9	(Israel) Mikhail Iakovlev	5	5	6	15	15	12	11	3	15	15	60
10	(Poland) Mateusz Rudyk	17	3	7	4	7	18	5	18	16	14	57
11	(Japan) Shinji Nakano	13	8	14	18	14	3	9	15	10	10	50
12	(France) Tom Derache	8	15	15	13	10	10	12	16	7	6	48
13	(India) Esow Alban	10	17	8	4	16	14	10	17	13	8	46
14	(United Kingdom) Hamish Turnbull	14	10	9	12	11	17	16	8	12	11	41
15	(Australia) Thomas Cornish	6	18	12	7	18	8	13	10	17	16	40
16	(France) Rayan Helal	16	12	18	9	8	16	14	6	14	13	36
17	(Kazakhstan) Sergey Ponomaryov	9	16	17	16	9	11	18	14	11	12	30
18	(Suriname) Jair Tjon En Fa	18	13	16	17	17	15	15	13	18	18	8

=== Endurance ===
Location	Event	Winner	Second	Third	Overall leader
Palma	Scratch race	(United Kingdom) Mark Stewart	(Spain) Sebastián Mora	(Italy) Michele Scartezzini	(United Kingdom) Mark Stewart
Palma	Elimination race	(Canada) Mathias Guillemette	(United States) Gavin Hoover	(United Kingdom) Mark Stewart	(United Kingdom) Mark Stewart
Berlin	Scratch race	(United Kingdom) Oliver Wood	(Switzerland) Claudio Imhof	(Italy) Matteo Donegà	(United Kingdom) Mark Stewart
Berlin	Elimination race	(Canada) Dylan Bibic	(United Kingdom) William Perrett	(Canada) Mathias Guillemette	(Canada) Mathias Guillemette
Paris	Scratch race	(Spain) Sebastián Mora	(Switzerland) Claudio Imhof	(Italy) Matteo Donegà	(Switzerland) Claudio Imhof
Paris	Elimination race	(United Kingdom) Oliver Wood	(Canada) Mathias Guillemette	(Switzerland) Claudio Imhof	(Switzerland) Claudio Imhof
London (I)	Scratch race	(United Kingdom) William Perrett	(Germany) Moritz Malcharek	(Canada) Dylan Bibic	(Switzerland) Claudio Imhof
London (I)	Elimination race	(United States) Gavin Hoover	(Canada) Mathias Guillemette	(Spain) Sebastián Mora	(Spain) Sebastián Mora
London (II)	Scratch race	(United Kingdom) Mark Stewart	(Netherlands) Matthijs Büchli	(United Kingdom) Oliver Wood	(Spain) Sebastián Mora
London (II)	Elimination race	(United Kingdom) Oliver Wood	(Switzerland) Claudio Imhof	(Netherlands) Matthijs Büchli	(Switzerland) Claudio Imhof

Final standings
Pos.	Rider	PAL (Spain)		BER (Germany)		PAR (France)		LON (United Kingdom)		LON2 (United Kingdom)		Points
Pos.	Rider	S	E	S	E	S	E	S	E	S	E	Points
1	(Switzerland) Claudio Imhof	7	7	2	4	2	3	10	4	7	2	125
2	(Spain) Sebastián Mora	2	5	11	5	1	9	4	3	4	4	125
3	(United Kingdom) Mark Stewart	1	3	9	8	9	5	5	8	1	8	115
4	(United Kingdom) Oliver Wood	10	12	1	10	12	1	9	6	3	1	112
5	(Canada) Mathias Guillemette	6	1	6	3	14	2	14	2	6	12	107
6	(Netherlands) Matthijs Büchli	12	6	7	7	6	4	8	7	2	3	104
7	(United Kingdom) William Perrett	8	4	12	2	13	17	1	5	12	9	87
8	(Germany) Moritz Malcharek	4	10	4	9	10	8	2	11	10	11	86
9	(Italy) Michele Scartezzini	3	9	10	6	4	7	11	9	17	5	83
10	(United States) Gavin Hoover	15	2	8	18	5	14	12	1	9	7	79
11	(Canada) Dylan Bibic	13	16	16	1	8	11	3	15	5	6	73
12	(Italy) Matteo Donegà	14	15	3	14	3	13	13	14	13	13	49
13	(Netherlands) Roy Eefting	11	18	5	12	7	15	6	12	15	18	45
14	(Poland) Filip Prokopyszyn	9	13	16	17	11	10	7	10	18	10	42
15	(United States) Grant Koontz	5	14	15	15	17	12	18	16	8	14	29
16	(Israel) Rotem Tene	18	8	16	16	15	6	17	17	16	15	20
17	(Spain) Erik Martorell	16	11	14	13	16	18	15	13	11	16	19
18	(Sweden) Gustav Johansson	17	17	13	11	18	16	16	18	14	17	10

=== Sprint ===
Location	Event	Winner	Second	Third	Overall leader
Palma	Sprint	(France) Mathilde Gros	(Netherlands) Hetty van de Wouw	(Ukraine) Olena Starikova	(France) Mathilde Gros
Palma	Keirin	(Colombia) Martha Bayona	(Canada) Kelsey Mitchell	(Germany) Lea Sophie Friedrich	(Netherlands) Shanne Braspennincx
Berlin	Keirin	(Canada) Kelsey Mitchell	(Colombia) Martha Bayona	(Netherlands) Shanne Braspennincx	(Netherlands) Shanne Braspennincx
Berlin	Sprint	(France) Mathilde Gros	(Netherlands) Laurine van Riessen	(Poland) Urszula Łoś	(Colombia) Martha Bayona
Paris	Keirin	(Netherlands) Steffie van der Peet	(France) Mathilde Gros	(Canada) Kelsey Mitchell	(France) Mathilde Gros
Paris	Sprint	(France) Mathilde Gros	(Colombia) Martha Bayona	(Ukraine) Olena Starikova	(France) Mathilde Gros
London (I)	Sprint	(Ukraine) Olena Starikova	(France) Mathilde Gros	(Netherlands) Shanne Braspennincx	(France) Mathilde Gros
London (I)	Keirin	(Netherlands) Steffie van der Peet	(Canada) Kelsey Mitchell	(Poland) Urszula Łoś	(France) Mathilde Gros
London (II)	Keirin	(Colombia) Martha Bayona	(Netherlands) Shanne Braspennincx	(Netherlands) Steffie van der Peet	(France) Mathilde Gros
London (II)	Sprint	(France) Mathilde Gros	(Canada) Kelsey Mitchell	(Colombia) Martha Bayona	(France) Mathilde Gros

Final standings
Pos.	Rider	PAL (Spain)		BER (Germany)		PAR (France)		LON (United Kingdom)		LON2 (United Kingdom)		Points
Pos.	Rider	S	K	K	V	K	S	S	K	K	S	Points
1	(France) Mathilde Gros	1	16	10	1	2	1	2	6	6	1	140
2	(Canada) Kelsey Mitchell	18	2	1	5	3	6	5	2	7	2	127
3	(Netherlands) Shanne Braspennincx	4	4	3	12	5	4	3	5	2	6	122
4	(Colombia) Martha Bayona	14	1	2	6	8	2	6	15	1	3	120
5	(Netherlands) Steffie van der Peet	10	9	8	7	1	10	4	1	3	14	106
6	(Ukraine) Olena Starikova	3	7	6	14	11	3	1	11	8	5	100
7	(Netherlands) Laurine van Riessen	12	10	4	2	12	5	7	4	11	7	91
8	(Netherlands) Hetty van de Wouw	2	12	5	15	6	11	12	7	4	9	81
9	(France) Taky Marie-Divine Kouamé	8	14	13	4	4	7	10	14	5	12	71
10	(Mexico) Daniela Gaxiola	6	8	7	8	7	9	13	8	16	11	67
11	(Spain) Helena Casas	11	6	11	10	10	8	11	9	12	8	64
12	(Poland) Urszula Łoś	5	15	16	3	15	13	9	3	13	10	62
13	(Germany) Pauline Grabosch	7	11	15	13	14	14	8	16	14	4	45
14	(Italy) Miriam Vece	13	17	12	11	9	15	14	12	10	15	33
15	(United Kingdom) Emma Finucane	17	18	14	16	13	12	15	10	9	13	26
16	(Republic of Ireland) Orla Walsh	15	13	9	9	16	16	16	13	15	16	22
17	(Germany) Lea Sophie Friedrich	9	3	17	DNS	DNS	DNS	DNS	DNS	DNS	DNS	22
18	(United Kingdom) Sophie Capewell	16	5	DNS	DNS	DNS	DNS	DNS	DNS	DNS	DNS	11

=== Endurance ===
Location	Event	Winner	Second	Third	Overall leader
Palma	Scratch race	(United Kingdom) Katie Archibald	(Spain) Tania Calvo	(United States) Jennifer Valente	(United Kingdom) Katie Archibald
Palma	Elimination race	(Norway) Anita Stenberg	(United States) Jennifer Valente	(United States) Lily Williams	(United States) Jennifer Valente
Berlin	Scratch race	(United Kingdom) Katie Archibald	(United States) Jennifer Valente	(Australia) Chloe Moran	(United States) Jennifer Valente
Berlin	Elimination race	(United Kingdom) Katie Archibald	(United States) Jennifer Valente	(United States) Lily Williams	(United States) Jennifer Valente
Paris	Scratch race	(United Kingdom) Sophie Lewis	(United Kingdom) Katie Archibald	(United States) Jennifer Valente	(United States) Jennifer Valente
Paris	Elimination race	(United Kingdom) Katie Archibald	(United States) Jennifer Valente	(Canada) Maggie Coles-Lyster	(United States) Jennifer Valente
London (I)	Scratch race	(Republic of Ireland) Emily Kay	(United Kingdom) Katie Archibald	(Norway) Anita Stenberg	(United Kingdom) Katie Archibald
London (I)	Elimination race	(United States) Jennifer Valente	(Norway) Anita Stenberg	(Canada) Maggie Coles-Lyster	(United States) Jennifer Valente
London (II)	Scratch race	(Australia) Chloe Moran	(Canada) Sarah Van Dam	(United Kingdom) Katie Archibald	(United States) Jennifer Valente
London (II)	Elimination race	(United Kingdom) Katie Archibald	(United States) Jennifer Valente	(Canada) Maggie Coles-Lyster	(United States) Jennifer Valente

Final standings
Pos.	Rider	PAL (Spain)		BER (Germany)		PAR (France)		LON (United Kingdom)		LON2 (United Kingdom)		Points
Pos.	Rider	S	E	S	E	S	E	S	E	S	E	Points
1	(United States) Jennifer Valente	3	2	2	2	3	2	4	1	4	2	161
2	(United Kingdom) Katie Archibald	1	18	1	1	2	1	2	7	3	1	158
3	(Canada) Maggie Coles-Lyster	14	4	5	8	4	3	9	3	5	3	110
4	(Norway) Anita Stenberg	12	1	4	15	7	6	2	3	6	5	110
5	(United States) Lily Williams	7	3	12	3	8	5	7	8	10	6	97
6	(New Zealand) Michaela Drummond	15	10	6	6	5	7	5	6	14	4	87
7	(Italy) Rachele Barbieri	5	11	13	4	6	11	8	4	7	8	85
8	(Canada) Sarah Van Dam	4	5	11	5	16	8	5	12	2	12	84
9	(United Kingdom) Sophie Lewis	8	7	9	12	1	9	11	11	11	10	76
10	(Republic of Ireland) Emily Kay	9	13	7	13	12	14	1	10	8	9	69
11	(Australia) Chloe Moran	11	12	3	10	13	DNS	12	13	1	15	61
12	(Italy) Silvia Zanardi	10	10	15	9	15	4	15	6	12	7	58
13	(Spain) Tania Calvo	2	9	16	14	9	13	10	9	13	13	55
14	(Germany) Lea Lin Teutenberg	6	17	8	11	16	DNS	13	17	9	11	38
15	(Switzerland) Michelle Andres	16	15	10	7	10	10	17	14	17	17	30
16	(Japan) Tsuyaka Uchino	18	16	14	17	11	15	14	15	15	14	14
17	(New Zealand) Emma Cumming	13	14	18	16	14	12	18	DNS	18	18	11
18	(United Kingdom) Laura Kenny	17	8	17	18	DNS	DNS	16	16	16	16	8
