= UCI Track Champions League =

Track cycling competition

Race details
- Date: November–December
- Region: Europe
- Discipline: Track
- Organiser: Union Cycliste Internationale; WBD Sports Events
- Web site: ucitrackchampionsleague.com

History
- First edition: 2021
- Editions: 4
- Final edition: 2024

UCI Track Champions League was a season-long track cycling competition held over four rounds around Europe during November and December. It was established in 2021 from a partnership between the UCI and WBD Sports Events, and was originally titled the UCI Track Cycling World League.

The competition consisted of two categories: endurance and sprint events, where overall titles were awarded for each at the end of the series. The endurance events consisted of an elimination race and a scratch race, while the sprint events consisted of the keirin and the individual sprint.

The competition was cancelled in March 2025.

== Overall winners ==
=== Men ===
==== Sprint ====
Year	Winner	Second	Third
2021	(Netherlands) Harrie Lavreysen	(Germany) Stefan Bötticher	(Russia) Mikhail Iakovlev
2022	(Australia) Matthew Richardson	(Netherlands) Harrie Lavreysen	(Germany) Stefan Bötticher
2023	(Netherlands) Harrie Lavreysen	(Australia) Matthew Richardson	(Poland) Mateusz Rudyk
2024	(Netherlands) Harrie Lavreysen	(United Kingdom) Matthew Richardson	(Colombia) Cristian Ortega

==== Endurance ====
Year	Winner	Second	Third
2021	(United States) Gavin Hoover	(Spain) Sebastián Mora	(New Zealand) Corbin Strong
2022	(Switzerland) Claudio Imhof	(Spain) Sebastián Mora	(United Kingdom) Mark Stewart
2023	(Canada) Dylan Bibic	(United Kingdom) William Tidball	(Belgium) Jules Hesters
2024	(Canada) Dylan Bibic	(Denmark) Tobias Hansen	(Belgium) Lindsay De Vylder

=== Women ===
==== Sprint ====
Year	Winner	Second	Third
2021	(Germany) Emma Hinze	(Germany) Lea Sophie Friedrich	(Canada) Kelsey Mitchell
2022	(France) Mathilde Gros	(Canada) Kelsey Mitchell	(Netherlands) Shanne Braspennincx
2023	(New Zealand) Ellesse Andrews	(Germany) Alessa-Catriona Pröpster	(Colombia) Martha Bayona
2024	Alina Lysenko	(United Kingdom) Emma Finucane	(Colombia) Martha Bayona

==== Endurance ====
Year	Winner	Second	Third
2021	(United Kingdom) Katie Archibald	(Netherlands) Kirsten Wild	(Australia) Annette Edmondson
2022	(United States) Jennifer Valente	(United Kingdom) Katie Archibald	(Canada) Maggie Coles-Lyster
2023	(United Kingdom) Katie Archibald	(Norway) Anita Stenberg	(United States) Lily Williams
2024	(United Kingdom) Katie Archibald	(Norway) Anita Stenberg	(Republic of Ireland) Lara Gillespie
