= 2021 UCI Track Cycling Nations Cup =

International track cycling competition

- First edition of the UCI Track Cycling Nations Cup

Details
- Dates: 13 May – 12 September 2021
- Location: Hong Kong; Russia; Colombia
- Races: 3

The 2021 UCI Track Cycling Nations Cup (also known as the Tissot UCI Track Cycling Nations Cup for sponsorship reasons) was a multi-race tournament over a track cycling season. It was the first series of the UCI Track Cycling Nations Cup organised by the UCI.

== Series ==
3 rounds were scheduled:

Date	Location
13-16 May	Hong Kong
8-11 July	Saint Petersburg, Russia
9-12 September	Cali, Colombia

== Standings ==
=== Men ===
Sprint

Rank	after 3 rounds	Points
1	(Colombia) Kevin Quintero	1520
2	(Colombia) Santiago Ramírez	1000
3	(Lithuania) Vasilijus Lendel	824
4	(Trinidad and Tobago) Nicholas Paul	800
5	(Japan) Yudai Nitta	800

Team Sprint

Rank	after 3 rounds	Points
1	Ukraine	2160
2	Malaysia	1680
3	India	1380
4	Canada	1200
5	Russia	1200

Individual Pursuit

Rank	after 3 rounds	Points
1	(Romania) Daniel Crista	1200
2	(Russia) Gleb Syritsa	800
3	(United States) Ashton Lambie	800
4	(Colombia) Bryan Gómez	720
5	(United Kingdom) Kyle Gordon	720

Team Pursuit

Rank	after 3 rounds	Points
1	Russia	1600
2	Colombia	1600
3	Germany	1600
4	Italy	1440
5	Denmark	1440

1 km Time Trial

Rank	after 3 rounds	Points
1	(Colombia) Santiago Ramírez	1200
2	(India) Ronaldo Laitonjam	848
3	(Trinidad and Tobago) Nicholas Paul	800
4	(Germany) Marc Jurczyk	800
5	(Germany) Felix Groß	800

Keirin

Rank	after 3 rounds	Points
1	(Colombia) Kevin Quintero	1280
2	(Lithuania) Vasilijus Lendel	1240
3	(Colombia) Santiago Ramírez	1040
4	(India) Esow Alben	1040
5	(Trinidad and Tobago) Nicholas Paul	800

Omnium

Rank	after 3 rounds	Points
1	(Belarus) Yauheni Karaliok	1520
2	(Romania) Daniel Crista	1200
3	(Japan) Eiya Hashimoto	800
4	(Colombia) Juan Esteban Arango	720
5	(Portugal) Iuri Leitao	720

Elimination Race

Rank	after 3 rounds	Points
1	(Trinidad and Tobago) Akil Campbell	800
2	(Italy) Carloalberto Giordani	800
3	(Japan) Eiya Hashimoto	800
4	(Belgium) Kenny De Ketele	720
5	(Russia) Alexander Smirnov	720

Madison

Rank	after 3 rounds	Points
1	Ukraine	3200
2	Austria	2640
3	Belarus	1920
4	Belgium	1600
5	Russia	1600

=== Women ===
Sprint

Rank	after 3 rounds	Points
1	(Colombia) Martha Bayona	1360
2	(Malaysia) Anis Amira Rosidi	848
3	(Russia) Anastasiia Voinova	800
4	(Hong Kong) Lee Wai Sze	800
5	(France) Mathilde Gros	720

Team Sprint

Rank	after 3 rounds	Points
1	Colombia	1200
2	Russia	1200
3	Hong Kong	1200
4	Poland	1080
5	Canada	960

Individual Pursuit

Rank	after 3 rounds	Points
1	(United States) Lily Williams	800
2	(Republic of Ireland) Kelly Murphy	800
3	(Belarus) Hanna Tserakh	800
4	(Germany) Laura Süßemilch	720
5	(Russia) Alena Ivanchenko	720

Team Pursuit

Rank	after 3 rounds	Points
1	Canada	1600
2	Ireland	1600
3	Poland	1440
4	Russia	1440
5	Colombia	1280

500 m Time Trial

Rank	after 3 rounds	Points
1	(Colombia) Martha Bayona	1600
2	(Malaysia) Anis Amira Rosidi	1160
3	(Italy) Miriam Vece	800
4	(France) Mathilde Gros	720
5	(Russia) Alina Lysenko	720

Keirin

Rank	after 3 rounds	Points
1	(Colombia) Martha Bayona	1600
2	(Japan) Yuka Kobayashi	800
3	(Mexico) Yuli Verdugo	720
4	(Germany) Alessa-Catriona Propster	720
5	(Hong Kong) Lee Wai Sze	720

Omnium

Rank	after 3 rounds	Points
1	(Austria) Verena Eberhardt	1360
2	(Poland) Daria Pikulik	800
3	(Portugal) Maria Martins	800
4	(Japan) Yumi Kajihara	800
5	(Ukraine) Tetyana Klimchenko	720

Elimination Race

Rank	after 3 rounds	Points
1	(Austria) Verena Eberhardt	1048
2	(Brazil) Alice Tamirys Leite	840
3	(Mexico) Yareli Acevedo	800
4	(Portugal) Maria Martins	800
5	(Japan) Yumi Kajihara	800

Madison

Rank	after 3 rounds	Points
1	Belarus	2480
2	Brazil	2160
3	Poland	1600
4	Russia (Marathon–Tula)	1600
5	Japan	1600

== Overall team standings ==
Overall team standings are calculated based on total number of points gained by the team's riders in each event.

Rank	Team	(Hong Kong)	(Russia)	(Colombia)	Total Points
1	Colombia		4960	19280	24240
2	Ukraine	5408	8688	5840	19936
3	Germany	7800	8604	3424	19828
4	Russia		18064		18064
5	Belarus	8400	9344		17744
6	Canada			16160	16160
7	Japan	14240			14240
8	Malaysia	2860		8364	11224
9	Spain	11016			11016
10	Mexico			10952	10952

== Results ==
=== Men ===
Event	Winner	Second	Third
Hong Kong | 13–16 May
Sprint; Details	Yudai Nitta (JPN); 10.291/10.289	Yuta Wakimoto (JPN) +0.034/+0.025	Tomohiro Fukaya (JPN) (Dream Seeker Racing Team); 10.414/10.307
Team Sprint; Details	Japan; Tomohiro Fukaya; Shinji Nakano; Yuta Obara (Dream Seeker Racing Team); 44.617	Spain; Ekain Jimenez; Alejandro Martinez; Juan Peralta; 45.177	Ukraine; Bohdan Danylchuk; Vladyslav Denysenko; Yehor Tkorobov; 45.816
Individual Pursuit; Details	Ashton Lambie (USA)	Domenic Weinstein (GER)	Leon Rohde (GBR); 4:15.723
Team Pursuit; Details	Germany; Theo Reinhardt; Felix Gross; Marco Mathis; Leon Rohde; 3:52.429	Denmark; Tobias Hansen; Matias Malmberg; William Levy; Robin Skivild; 3:56.800	Japan; Eiya Hashimoto; Shunsuke Imamura; Naoki Kojima; Kazushige Kuboki; 4:04.303
1 km Time Trial; Details	Felix Gross (GER); 1:00.774	Muhammad Fadhil Mohd Zonis (MAS) (Sime Darby Foundation); 1:01.772	Juan Peralta (ESP); 1:02.173
Keirin; Details	Muhammad Fadhil Mohd Zonis (MAS) (Sime Darby Foundation)	Yuta Wakimoto (JPN)	Yudai Nitta (JPN)
Omnium; Details	Eiya Hashimoto (JPN); 138 pts.	Yauheni Karaliok (BLR); 134 pts.	Matias Malmberg (DEN); 125 pts.
Scratch Race; Details	Yauheni Karaliok (BLR)	Moritz Malcharek (GER)	Kazushige Kuboki (JPN)
Elimination Race; Details	Eiya Hashimoto (JPN)	Erik Martorell (ESP)	Moritz Malcharek (GER)
Madison; Details	Germany; Moritz Malcharek; Theo Reinhardt; 88 pts.	Austria; Andreas Muller; Andreas Graf; 65 pts.	Japan; Eiya Hashimoto; Shunsuke Imamura; 51 pts.
Russia, Saint Petersburg | 8–11 July
Sprint; Details	Kevin Quintero (COL) +0.007/10.201/10.122	Mikhail Iakovlev (RUS); 10.144/+0.093/+0.087	Tom Derache (FRA); 10.211/10.253
Team Sprint; Details	Russia; Danila Burlakov; Ivan Gladyshev; Mikhail Iakovlev (Russian Federation A); 43.996	Russia; Kirill Lii; Alexander Sharapov; Aleksei Tkachev (Russian Federation B); 46.447	Russia; Aleksander Dubchenko; Daniil Komkov; Pavel Rostov (Marathon–Tula); 44.152
Individual Pursuit; Details	Gleb Syritsa (RUS); 4:11.773	Kyle Gordon (SCO) (Scotland Track Cycling Team); 4:17.575	Davide Plebani (ITA); 4:23.191
Team Pursuit; Details	Russia; Gleb Syritsa; Lev Gonov; Egor Igoshev; Ivan Smirnov (Russian Federation B)	Italy; Stefano Moro; Davide Boscaro; Carloalberto Giordani; Davide Plebani	Russia; Vlas Shichkin; Nikita Bersenev; Ivan Novolodskii; Ilia Shchegolkov (Russian Federation A); 3:54.201
1 km Time Trial; Details	Marc Jurczyk (GER); 1:00.552	Quentin Lafargue (FRA); 1:00.827	Alexander Sharapov (RUS); 1:00.959
Keirin; Details	Tom Derache (FRA)	Vasilijus Lendel (LTU)	Joachim Eilers (GER)
Omnium; Details	Yauheni Karaliok (BLR); 177 pts.	Iuri Leitao (POR); 166 pts.	Claudio Imhof (SUI); 144 pts.
Elimination Race; Details	Carloalberto Giordani (ITA)	Alexander Smirnov (RUS)	Christos Volikakis (GRE)
Madison; Details	Russia; Lev Gonov; Ivan Smirnov; 83 pts.	Portugal; Iuri Leitao; Joao Matias; 76 pts.	Russia; Artur Ershov; Sergei Rostovtsev (Marathon–Tula); 55 pts.
Colombia, Cali | 9–12 September
Sprint; Details	Nicholas Paul (TTO); 10.196/9.845	Kevin Quintero (COL) +0.125/+0.516	Rayan Helal (FRA); 10.054/10.035
Team Sprint; Details	Canada; Hugo Barrette; Ryan Dodyk; Nick Wammes; 43.478	Colombia; Rubén Murillo; Kevin Quintero; Juan Ochoa; 43.836	Poland; Mateusz Milek; Patryk Rajkowski; Daniel Rochna; 43.830
Individual Pursuit; Details	Daniel Crista (ROU); 4:25.712	Bryan Gómez (COL); 4:28.598	Julián Osorio (COL); 4:28.703
Team Pursuit; Details	Colombia; Juan Esteban Arango; Bryan Gómez; Jordan Parra; Juan Pablo Zapata; 3:55.081	Canada; Michael Foley; Jackson Kinniburgh; Mathias Guillemette; Sean Richardson; Ethan Ogrodniczuk; OVL	Mexico; Ricardo Peña Salas; Tomas Aguirre Garza; Jorge Martinez Huerta; Jose Ramon Muñiz
1 km Time Trial; Details	Nicholas Paul (TTO); 59.994	Patryk Rajkowski (POL); 1:00.240	Santiago Ramírez (COL); 1:00.464
Keirin; Details	Nicholas Paul (TTO)	Kevin Quintero (COL)	Santiago Ramírez (COL)
Omnium; Details	Daniel Crista (ROU); 128 pts.	Juan Esteban Arango (COL); 128 pts.	Cristian Arriagada Pizarro (CHL); 127 pts.
Elimination Race; Details	Akil Campbell (TTO)	Kenny De Ketele (BEL)	Cristian Arriagada Pizarro (CHL)
Madison; Details	Belgium; Kenny De Ketele; Tuur Dens; 89 pts.	Colombia; Juan Esteban Arango; Jordan Parra; 68 pts.	Chile; Antonio Cabrera; Felipe Peñaloza; 40 pts.

=== Women ===
Event	Winner	Second	Third
Hong Kong | 13–16 May
Sprint; Details	Lee Wai Sze (HKG); 11.534/11.609	Yuka Kobayashi (JPN) +0.119/+0.359	Fuko Umekawa (JPN) (Team Rakuten K Dreams); 11.686/11.949
Team Sprint; Details	Hong Kong; Yeung Cho Yiu; Lee Hoi Yan Jessica; Lee Wai Sze; 50.969	No Competitor	No Competitor
Individual Pursuit; Details	Hanna Tserakh (BLR); 3:37.364	Kie Furuyama (JPN) (Team Rakuten K Dreams); 3:44.147	Ina Savenka (BLR)
Team Pursuit; No Data	No Competitor	No Competitor	No Competitor
500 m Time Trial; Details	Miriam Vece (ITA); 34.022	Helena Casas Roige (ESP); 34.905	Anis Amira Rosidi (MAS) (Sime Darby Foundation); 35.493
Keirin; Details	Yuka Kobayashi (JPN)	Lee Wai Sze (HKG)	Madalyn Godby (USA)
Omnium; Details	Yumi Kajihara (JPN); 146 pts.	Anita Stenberg (NOR); 136 pts.	Verena Eberhardt (AUT); 118 pts.
Scratch Race; Details	Tatsiana Sharakova (BLR)	Yumi Kajihara (JPN)	Tania Calvo (ESP)
Elimination Race; Details	Yumi Kajihara (JPN)	Verena Eberhardt (AUT)	Eukene Larrarte (ESP)
Madison; Details	Japan; Yumi Kajihara; Kisato Nakamura; 46 pts.	Belarus; Ina Savenka; Hanna Tserakh; 38 pts.	Japan; Kie Furuyama; Nao Suzuki (Team Rakuten K Dreams); 33 pts.
Russia, Saint Petersburg | 8–11 July
Sprint; Details	Anastasiia Voinova (RUS); 10.985/11.104	Yana Tyshchenko (RUS) +2.236/+0.134	Simona Krupeckaite (LTU); 11.714/11.409/11.499
Team Sprint; Details	Russia; Natalia Antonova; Yana Tyshchenko; Anastasiia Voinova (Russian Federation A); 47.639	Russia; Ekaterina Gnidenko; Alina Lysenko; Polina Vashchenko; Ksenia Andreeva (Russian Federation B); 48.542	Germany; Katharina Albers; Alessa-Catriona Propster; Christina Sperlich; 49.809
Individual Pursuit; Details	Kelly Murphy (IRL); 3:30.422	Alena Ivanchenko (RUS); 3:33.064	Mia Griffin (IRL); 3:37.075
Team Pursuit; Details	Ireland; Lara Gillespie; Mia Griffin; Kelly Murphy; Alice Sharpe; 4:21.411	Russia; Inna Abaidullina; Alena Ivanchenko; Mariia Miliaeva; Valeria Valgonen; Taisiia Churenkova; 4:23.276	Switzerland; Lena Mettraux; Aline Seitz; Michelle Andres; Fabienne Buri 4:34.182
500 m Time Trial; Details	Martha Bayona (COL); 33.806	Alina Lysenko (RUS); 33.844	Nataliia Antonova (RUS); 34.266
Keirin; Details	Martha Bayona (COL)	Alessa-Catriona Propster (GER)	Katharina Albers (GER)
Omnium; Details	Maria Martins (POR); 131 pts.	Verena Eberhardt (AUT); 117 pts.	Lara Gillespie (IRL); 110 pts.
Elimination Race; Details	Maria Martins (POR)	Diana Klimova (RUS) (Marathon–Tula)	Olivija Baleisyte (LTU)
Madison; Details	Russia; Gulnaz Khatuntseva; Diana Klimova (Marathon–Tula); 50 pts.	Russia; Inna Abaidullina; Alena Ivanchenko; 41 pts.	Switzerland; Aline Seitz; Michelle Andres; 32 pts.
Colombia, Cali | 9–12 September
Sprint; Details	Martha Bayona (COL); 11.145/11.437	Mathilde Gros (FRA) +0.127/+5.518	Sarah Orban (CAN); 11.431/11.209
Team Sprint; Details	Colombia; Martha Bayona; Juliana Gaviria; Yarli Mosquera; 47.969	Poland; Marlena Karwacka; Urszula Los; Nikola Sibiak; 48.634	Canada; Erin Attwell; Jackie Boyle; Sarah Orban; 49.361
Individual Pursuit; Details	Lily Williams (USA); 3:33.268	Laura Süßemilch (GER); 3:33.927	Lena Charlotte Reissner (GER); 3:32.981
Team Pursuit; Details	Canada; Ngaire Barraclough; Sarah Van Dam; Erin Attwell; Lily Plante	Poland; Daria Pikulik; Nikol Plosaj; Wiktoria Pikulik; Nikola Wielowska	Colombia; Lina Hernández; Jessica Parra; Lina Rojas; Camila Valbuena; 4:26.789
500 m Time Trial; Details	Martha Bayona (COL); 33.233	Mathilde Gros (FRA); 34.506	Nikola Sibiak (POL); 34.955
Keirin; Details	Martha Bayona (COL)	Yuli Verdugo (MEX)	Urszula Los (POL)
Omnium; Details	Daria Pikulik (POL); 147 pts.	Tetyana Klimchenko (UKR); 118 pts.	Lina Hernández (COL); 116 pts.
Elimination Race; Details	Yareli Acevedo (MEX)	Kseniia Fedotova (UKR)	Nikol Plosaj (POL)
Madison; Details	Poland; Daria Pikulik; Wiktoria Pikulik; 53 pts.	Ukraine; Kseniia Fedotova; Tetyana Klimchenko; 22 pts.	Colombia; Lina Hernández; Lina Rojas; 21 pts.

== Medal table ==
Rank	Team	Gold	Silver	Bronze	Total
1	Colombia	8	6	6	20
2	Japan	7	4	4	15
3	Russia	6	9	3	18
4	Germany	4	4	6	14
5	Belarus	4	2	1	7
6	Trinidad and Tobago	4	0	0	4
7	Poland	2	3	4	9
8	Portugal	2	2	0	4
9	Canada	2	1	2	5
10	Italy	2	1	1	4
11	Hong Kong	2	1	0	3
12	Ireland	2	0	2	4
13	United States	2	0	1	3
14	Romania	2	0	0	2
15	France	1	3	2	6
16	Marathon–Tula	1	1	2	4
17	Mexico	1	1	1	3
17	Sime Darby Foundation	1	1	1	3
19	Belgium	1	1	0	2
20	Dream Seeker Racing Team	1	0	1	2
21	Spain	0	3	3	6
22	Austria	0	3	1	4
22	Ukraine	0	3	1	4
24	Lithuania	0	1	2	3
24	Team Rakuten K Dreams	0	1	2	3
26	Denmark	0	1	1	2
27	Norway	0	1	0	1
27	Scotland	0	1	0	1
29	Chile	0	0	3	3
29	Switzerland	0	0	3	3
31	Greece	0	0	1	1
Totals (31 entries)		55	54	54	163
