= 2021 UCI Track Champions League =

Track cycling competition

- First edition of the UCI Track Champions League

Details
- Dates: 6 November – 4 December 2021 (Note: The season was due to finish on 11 December 2021, but was amended following the cancellation of the final round in Israel.)
- Location: Europe
- Races: 4

The 2021 UCI Track Champions League was the first edition of the UCI Track Champions League, a track cycling competition held over four rounds in November and December 2021.

It was established in March 2020 by the Union Cycliste Internationale (UCI) and Discovery, Inc. as the UCI Track Cycling World League, before the UCI Track Champions League name was adopted the following November.

Titles were awarded in two categories – Endurance and Sprint – for women and men; the women's titles were won by Emma Hinze (Sprint) and Katie Archibald (Endurance), while the men's titles were won by Harrie Lavreysen (Sprint) and Gavin Hoover (Endurance).

== Events ==
The inaugural season of the UCI Track Champions League was due to consist of six events in November and December 2021. In September, the scheduled second round – due to be held at the Vélodrome National in Saint-Quentin-en-Yvelines on 20 November – was cancelled without replacement, due to its continued use as a vaccination centre during the COVID-19 pandemic in France. The scheduled final round – due to be held at the Sylvan Adams National Velodrome in Tel Aviv on 11 December – was cancelled on 2 December, following a change in public health restrictions associated with the COVID-19 pandemic in Israel, which resulted in the country's borders being closed to non-citizens.

Each round had two races for each of the two categories of racing, for a total of eight races during the season. The Sprint category consisted of individual sprint and keirin races, while the Endurance category consisted of scratch and elimination races.

Events
Round	Date	Venue	Location
1	6 November	(Spain) Velòdrom Illes Balears	Palma de Mallorca
2	27 November	(Lithuania) Cido Arena	Panevėžys
3	3 December	(United Kingdom) Lee Valley VeloPark	London
4	4 December	(United Kingdom) Lee Valley VeloPark	London

== Points standings ==
=== Scoring system ===
Points were awarded to the top fifteen riders, with twenty points being awarded to each race winner. In the case of a tie on points, a countback system was used where the highest most recent race result determined the final positions. The leader of each classification was denoted by a light blue jersey.

Position	1st	2nd	3rd	4th	5th	6th	7th	8th	9th	10th	11th	12th	13th	14th	15th	16th–18th
Points	20	17	15	13	11	10	9	8	7	6	5	4	3	2	1	0

=== Sprint ===
==== Women ====
Final standings
Pos.	Rider	MAL (Spain)		PAN (Lithuania)		LDN1 (United Kingdom)		LDN2 (United Kingdom)		Points
Pos.	Rider	K	S	S	K	K	S	S	K	Points
1	Emma Hinze (GER)	2	1	1	2	15	1	1	4	128
2	Lea Friedrich (GER)	4	2	10	1	1	2	3	6	118
3	Kelsey Mitchell (CAN)	1	3	16	3	9	5	2	2	102
4	Martha Bayona (COL)	3	9	15	4	2	7	7	3	86
5	Olena Starikova (UKR)	16	5	3	14	6	4	4	1	84
6	Mathilde Gros (FRA)	5	11	4	11	4	6	6	16	67
7	Simona Krupeckaitė (LTU)	15	8	6	12	3	10	5	11	60
8	Yana Tyshchenko (RUS)	7	10	7	9	8	3	12	14	60
9	Miriam Vece (ITA)	6	7	14	15	5	11	9	9	52
10	Lauriane Genest (CAN)	18	4	2	10	16	9	8	15	52
11	Mina Sato (JPN)	10	18	9	7	7	12	15	5	47
12	Yuli Verdugo (MEX)	14	12	5	17	12	8	10	8	43
13	Riyu Ohta (JPN)	12	13	17	6	11	13	13	7	37
14	Shanne Braspennincx (NED)	8	6	8	8	DNS	DNS			34
15	Sophie Capewell (GBR)	17	15	13	18	10	14	11	10	23
16	Anastasia Voynova (RUS)	9	17	11	13	13	16	14	13	23
17	Laurine van Riessen (NED)	13	14	12	5	DNS	DNS			20
18	Daria Shmeleva (RUS)	11	16	18	16	14	15	16	12	12

==== Men ====
Final standings
Pos.	Rider	MAL (Spain)		PAN (Lithuania)		LDN1 (United Kingdom)		LDN2 (United Kingdom)		Points
Pos.	Rider	S	K	K	S	S	K	K	S	Points
1	Harrie Lavreysen (NED)	1	2	1	1	1	4	2	1	147
2	Stefan Bötticher (GER)	4	1	3	5	2	1	1	2	133
3	Mikhail Iakovlev (RUS)	2	15	10	6	7	7	11	3	72
4	Vasilijus Lendel (LTU)	12	7	6	7	3	2	14	10	72
5	Jair Tjon En Fa (SUR)	9	14	11	13	4	3	4	4	71
6	Nicholas Paul (TRI)	5	4	17	2	11	6	12	5	71
7	Kevin Quintero (COL)	8	8	18	3	13	11	3	8	62
8	Rayan Helal (FRA)	7	11	4	15	9	8	9	6	60
9	Denis Dmitriev (RUS)	10	17	5	4	6	17	10	14	48
10	Jai Angsuthasawit (THA)	14	18	7	8	12	10	7	7	47
11	Jeffrey Hoogland (NED)	3	3	2	18	DNS	DNS			47
12	Maximilian Levy (GER)	13	13	16	14	8	5	6	9	44
13	Mateusz Rudyk (POL)	6	16	8	10	14	14	5	11	44
14	Hugo Barrette (CAN)	17	5	14	9	10	13	8	12	41
15	Tom Derache (FRA)	11	9	15	11	5	9	15	13	40
16	Jordan Castle (NZL)	16	12	9	12	15	12	16	15	21
17	Kento Yamasaki (JPN)	15	6	12	16	16	16	13	17	18
18	Jean Spies (RSA)	18	10	13	17	17	15	17	16	10

=== Endurance ===
==== Women ====
Final standings
Pos.	Rider	MAL (Spain)		PAN (Lithuania)		LDN1 (United Kingdom)		LDN2 (United Kingdom)		Points
Pos.	Rider	S	E	S	E	S	E	S	E	Points
1	Katie Archibald (GBR)	4	1	1	1	3	1	2	1	145
2	Kirsten Wild (NED)	8	2	6	18	1	2	5	2	100
3	Annette Edmondson (AUS)	6	4	4	5	5	3	4	5	97
4	Maggie Coles-Lyster (CAN)	1	6	2	4	14	8	3	7	94
5	Yumi Kajihara (JPN)	5	14	3	16	9	4	1	4	81
6	Anita Stenberg (NOR)	9	3	5	2	4	13	7	17	75
7	Olivija Baleišytė (LTU)	2	5	9	7	8	5	11	10	74
8	Maria Martins (POR)	11	8	8	11	2	18	6	3	68
9	Silvia Zanardi (ITA)	14	7	10	3	7	6	13	9	61
10	Emily Kay (IRL)	7	16	7	12	11	9	8	6	52
11	Hanna Tserakh (BLR)	3	9	17	17	13	12	9	12	40
12	Tania Calvo (ESP)	12	11	15	8	6	16	10	15	35
13	Michelle Andres (SUI)	16	10	13	10	18	10	14	8	31
14	Eukene Larrarte (ESP)	15	13	11	15	10	14	18	11	23
15	Karolina Karasiewicz (POL)	13	15	18	9	17	7	15	18	21
16	Kendall Ryan (USA)	10	17	14	6	16	15	16	16	19
17	Gulnaz Khatuntseva (RUS)	DNS	DNS	12	14	15	11	12	14	18
18	Alžbeta Bačíková (SVK)	17	12	16	13	12	17	17	13	14

==== Men ====
Final standings
Pos.	Rider	MAL (Spain)		PAN (Lithuania)		LDN1 (United Kingdom)		LDN2 (United Kingdom)		Points
Pos.	Rider	S	E	S	E	S	E	S	E	Points
1	Gavin Hoover (USA)	6	2	3	5	5	1	6	4	107
2	Sebastián Mora (ESP)	12	3	1	1	3	3	14	5	102
3	Corbin Strong (NZL)	1	1	8	7	10	11	2	8	93
4	Iúri Leitão (POR)	2	4	9	9	11	9	8	1	84
5	Aaron Gate (NZL)	7	5	12	2	6	13	4	2	84
6	Kelland O'Brien (AUS)	11	9	4	3	8	7	9	6	74
7	Rhys Britton (GBR)	3	15	2	11	4	8	7	10	74
8	Roy Eefting (NED)	5	7	13	10	13	12	1	3	71
9	Michele Scartezzini (ITA)	13	12	6	4	9	6	5	12	62
10	Alan Banaszek (POL)	10	6	7	14	12	2	15	9	56
11	Claudio Imhof (SUI)	16	18	5	13	1	5	10	18	51
12	Kazushige Kuboki (JPN)	8	8	10	6	2	18	16	15	50
13	William Tidball (GBR)					7	10	3	7	39
14	Erik Martorell (ESP)	4	14	15	15	15	4	13	13	37
15	Jules Hesters (BEL)	9	17	14	8					17
16	Ed Clancy (GBR)	15	16	11	17	14	15	11	14	16
17	Yacine Chalel (ALG)	18	10	17	16	17	14	17	11	13
18	Rotem Tene (ISR)	17	11	16	12	16	16	12	17	13
19	Tuur Dens (BEL)	14	13	DNS	DNS					5
20	Josh Charlton (GBR)					18	17	18	16	0
