= 2022 UCI Track Cycling World Championships – Men's scratch =

Men's scratch at the 2022 UCI Track Cycling World Championships
- Venue: Vélodrome National
- Location: Saint-Quentin-en-Yvelines, France
- Dates: 13 October
- Competitors: 23 from 23 nations

Medalists
gold medal	Dylan Bibic	Canada
silver medal	Kazushige Kuboki	Japan
bronze medal	Roy Eefting	Netherlands

The Men's scratch competition at the 2022 UCI Track Cycling World Championships was held on 13 October 2022.

== Results ==
The race was started at 20:49. First rider across the line without a net lap loss wins.

Rank	Name	Nation	Laps down
1st place, gold medalist(s)	Dylan Bibic	Canada	
2nd place, silver medalist(s)	Kazushige Kuboki	Japan	
3rd place, bronze medalist(s)	Roy Eefting	Netherlands	
4	Tuur Dens	Belgium	
5	Donavan Grondin	France	
6	Sebastián Mora	Spain	
7	Filip Prokopyszyn	Poland	
8	Gavin Hoover	United States	
9	Rui Oliveira	Portugal	
10	Aaron Gate	New Zealand	
11	Mattia Pinazzi	Italy	
12	Rasmus Pedersen	Denmark	
13	Tim Wafler	Austria	
14	Rhys Britton	Great Britain	
15	Daniel Babor	Czech Republic	
16	Moritz Malcharek	Germany	
17	Rotem Tene	Israel	
18	Facundo Lezica	Argentina	
19	Alex Vogel	Switzerland	
	Yacine Chalel	Algeria	Did not finish
	Akil Campbell	Trinidad and Tobago	Did not finish
	Joshua Duffy	Australia	Did not finish
	Martin Chren	Slovakia	Did not finish
	Mohammad Ganjkhanlou	Iran	Did not start
