= 2015 UEC European Track Championships – Men's points race =

Men's points race at the 2015 UEC European Track Championships
- UEC European Champion jersey
- Venue: Velodrome Suisse, Grenchen
- Date: 16 October
- Competitors: 21 from 21 nations

Medalists
gold medal	Wojciech Pszczolarski	Poland
silver medal	Benjamin Thomas	France
bronze medal	Claudio Imhof	Switzerland

The Men's points race was held on 16 October 2015. 21 riders participated over a distance of 40 km (160 laps), with sprints every 10 laps awarding 5, 3, 2 or 1 point to the first four; 20 points are also awarded/withdrawn for each lap gained/lost respectively.

== Results ==
Rank	Name	Nation	Sprint points	Lap points	Finish order	Total points
1st place, gold medalist(s)	Wojciech Pszczolarski	Poland	24	0	2	24
2nd place, silver medalist(s)	Benjamin Thomas	France	21	0	13	21
3rd place, bronze medalist(s)	Claudio Imhof	Switzerland	19	0	1	19
4	Casper Pedersen	Denmark	19	0	6	19
5	Eloy Teruel	Spain	13	0	4	13
6	Raman Ramanau	Belarus	12	0	5	12
7	Kirill Sveshnikov	Russia	9	0	3	9
8	Ivo Oliveira	Portugal	8	0	8	8
9	Liam Bertazzo	Italy	8	0	11	8
10	Martin Bláha	Czech Republic	7	0	12	7
11	Krisztián Lovassy	Hungary	6	0	7	6
12	Ioannis Spanopoulos	Greece	6	0	9	6
13	Roger Kluge	Germany	4	0	10	4
14	Mark Downey	Ireland	4	0	15	4
15	Oliver Wood	Great Britain	3	0	14	3
16	Andreas Graf	Austria	2	0	18	2
17	Kenny De Ketele	Belgium	1	0	16	1
18	Wim Stroetinga	Netherlands	0	0	17	0
—	Alexander Perez	Norway	10	-40	–	DNF
—	Recep Ünalan	Turkey	0	-40	–	DNF
—	Vitaliy Hryniv	Ukraine	1	-60	–	DNF
