= 2023 UCI Track Cycling World Championships – Women's keirin =

Women's keirin at the 2023 UCI Track Cycling World Championships
- Venue: Sir Chris Hoy Velodrome
- Location: Glasgow, United Kingdom
- Dates: 5–6 August
- Competitors: 26 from 17 nations

Medalists
gold medal	Ellesse Andrews	New Zealand
silver medal	Martha Bayona	Colombia
bronze medal	Lea Friedrich	Germany

The Women's keirin competition at the 2023 UCI Track Cycling World Championships was held on 5 and 6 August 2023.

== Results ==
=== First round ===
The first round was started on 5 August at 18:21. The first two riders from each heat qualified for the quarterfinals, all other riders moved to the repechages.

Heat 1

Rank	Name	Nation	Gap	Notes
1	Lea Friedrich	Germany		Q
2	Hetty van de Wouw	Netherlands	+0.091	Q
3	Nicky Degrendele	Belgium	+0.137	
4	Urszula Łoś	Poland	+0.361	
5	Lauriane Genest	Canada	+0.524	

Heat 3

Rank	Name	Nation	Gap	Notes
1	Martha Bayona	Colombia		Q
2	Kelsey Mitchell	Canada	+0.210	Q
3	Riyu Ohta	Japan	+0.857	
4	Taky Marie-Divine Kouamé	France	+0.984	
5	Emma Hinze	Germany	+1.185	

Heat 5

Rank	Name	Nation	Gap	Notes
1	Ellesse Andrews	New Zealand		Q
2	Katy Marchant	Great Britain	+0.022	Q
3	Marlena Karwacka	Poland	+0.160	
4	Mina Sato	Japan	+0.165	
5	Yeung Cho Yiu	Hong Kong	+0.318	
6	Miriam Vece	Italy	+0.329	

Heat 2

Rank	Name	Nation	Gap	Notes
1	Kristina Clonan	Australia		Q
2	Mathilde Gros	France	+0.043	Q
3	Daniela Gaxiola	Mexico	+0.123	
4	Nurul Mohd	Malaysia	+0.262	
5	Fuko Umekawa	Japan		REL

Heat 4

Rank	Name	Nation	Gap	Notes
1	Emma Finucane	Great Britain		Q
2	Alessa-Catriona Pröpster	Germany	+0.016	Q
3	Steffie van der Peet	Netherlands	+0.144	
4	Helena Casas	Spain	+0.686	
5	Veronika Jaborníková	Czech Republic	+0.997	

=== First round repechage ===
The first round was started on 5 August at 19:43. The first two riders from each heat qualified for the quarterfinals.

Heat 1

Rank	Name	Nation	Gap	Notes
1	Miriam Vece	Italy		Q
2	Nicky Degrendele	Belgium	+0.044	Q
3	Helena Casas	Spain	+0.158	
4	Taky Marie-Divine Kouamé	France	+0.296	

Heat 3

Rank	Name	Nation	Gap	Notes
1	Riyu Ohta	Japan		Q
2	Lauriane Genest	Canada	+0.014	Q
3	Veronika Jaborníková	Czech Republic	+0.224	
4	Urszula Łoś	Poland	+0.389	

Heat 2

Rank	Name	Nation	Gap	Notes
1	Mina Sato	Japan		Q
2	Daniela Gaxiola	Mexico	+0.453	Q
3	Yeung Cho Yiu	Hong Kong	+0.731	
4	Nurul Mohd	Malaysia	+0.836	

Heat 4

Rank	Name	Nation	Gap	Notes
1	Emma Hinze	Germany		Q
2	Steffie van der Peet	Netherlands	+0.156	Q
3	Marlena Karwacka	Poland	+0.349	
4	Fuko Umekawa	Japan	+0.641	

=== Quarterfinals ===
The quarterfinals were held on 6 August at 11:54. The first four riders from each heat qualified for the semifinals.

Heat 1

Rank	Name	Nation	Gap	Notes
1	Lea Friedrich	Germany		Q
2	Steffie van der Peet	Netherlands	+0.261	Q
3	Kelsey Mitchell	Canada	+0.506	Q
4	Mathilde Gros	France	+0.801	Q
5	Mina Sato	Japan		REL
6	Emma Finucane	Great Britain		DNF

Heat 3

Rank	Name	Nation	Gap	Notes
1	Martha Bayona	Colombia		Q
2	Hetty van de Wouw	Netherlands	+0.324	Q
3	Nicky Degrendele	Belgium	+0.361	Q
4	Alessa-Catriona Pröpster	Germany	+0.364	Q
5	Daniela Gaxiola	Mexico	+0.414	
6	Katy Marchant	Great Britain	+0.656	

Heat 2

Rank	Name	Nation	Gap	Notes
1	Emma Hinze	Germany		Q
2	Ellesse Andrews	New Zealand	+0.647	Q
3	Riyu Ohta	Japan	+0.762	Q
4	Kristina Clonan	Australia	+0.868	Q
5	Lauriane Genest	Canada	+1.004	
6	Miriam Vece	Italy	+1.833	

=== Semifinals ===
The semifinals were held on 6 August at 1813:54. The first three riders in each heat qualified for the final, all other riders raced for places 7 to 12.

Heat 1

Rank	Name	Nation	Gap	Notes
1	Lea Friedrich	Germany		Q
2	Ellesse Andrews	New Zealand	+0.013	Q
3	Nicky Degrendele	Belgium	+0.106	Q
4	Riyu Ohta	Japan	+0.161	
5	Steffie van der Peet	Netherlands	+0.497	
6	Alessa-Catriona Pröpster	Germany	+1.264	

Heat 2

Rank	Name	Nation	Gap	Notes
1	Martha Bayona	Colombia		Q
2	Mathilde Gros	France	+0.042	Q
3	Hetty van de Wouw	Netherlands	+0.086	Q
4	Kelsey Mitchell	Canada	+0.179	
5	Emma Hinze	Germany	+0.332	
6	Kristina Clonan	Australia	+0.441	

=== Finals ===
The finals were started on 6 August at 19:57.

==== Small final ====
Rank	Name	Nation	Gap	Notes
7	Kristina Clonan	Australia		
8	Steffie van der Peet	Netherlands	+0.132	
9	Kelsey Mitchell	Canada	+0.168	
10	Alessa-Catriona Pröpster	Germany	+0.173	
11	Riyu Ohta	Japan	+0.331	
12	Emma Hinze	Germany	+0.498	

==== Final ====
Rank	Name	Nation	Gap	Notes
1st place, gold medalist(s)	Ellesse Andrews	New Zealand		
2nd place, silver medalist(s)	Martha Bayona	Colombia	+0.010	
3rd place, bronze medalist(s)	Lea Friedrich	Germany	+0.104	
4	Hetty van de Wouw	Netherlands	+0.112	
5	Nicky Degrendele	Belgium	+0.140	
6	Mathilde Gros	France	+0.267	
