= Kevin Quintero =

Colombian track cyclist (born 1998)

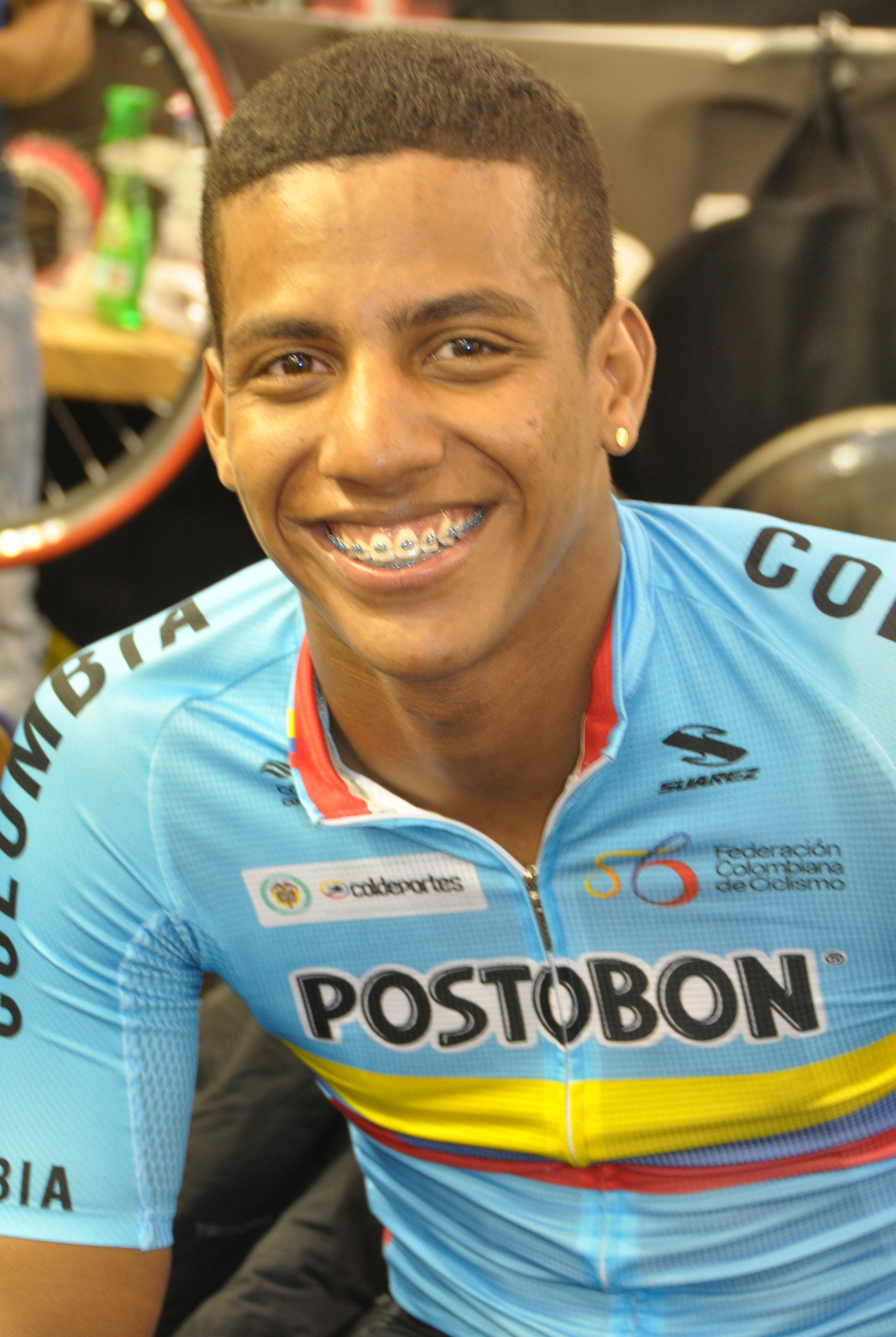
- Quintero in 2018

Personal information
- Full name: Kevin Santiago Quintero Chavarro
- Born: 28 October 1998 (age 27) Palmira, Valle del Cauca, Colombia
- Height: 1.80 m (5 ft 11 in)
- Weight: 80 kg (176 lb)

Cycling career
- Sport: Cycling
- Discipline: Track
- Role: Rider
- Rider type: Sprinter

Major wins
- Keirin, World Championships (2023) UCI Nations Cup Keirin (2021, 2022, 2023) Sprint (2021)
Medal record
Representing Colombia
Men's track cycling
Event	1st	2nd	3rd
World Championships	1	0	2
Nations Cup	4	1	1
Nations Cup stage	3	6	0
Champions League stage	1	1	4
Pan American Games	3	2	1
Pan American Championships	8	9	6
CAC Games	1	4	4
South American Games	3	0	1
Bolivarian Games	6	0	0
Total	30	23	19
World Championships
Gold medal – first place	2023 Glasgow	Keirin
Bronze medal – third place	2022 Saint-Quentin-en-Yvelines	Keirin
Bronze medal – third place	2024 Ballerup	Keirin
Nations Cup
Gold medal – first place	2021	Keirin
Gold medal – first place	2021	Sprint
Gold medal – first place	2022	Keirin
Gold medal – first place	2023	Keirin
Silver medal – second place	2022	Team sprint
World Cup
Bronze medal – third place	2019–20	Keirin
Pan American Games
Gold medal – first place	2019 Lima	Keirin
Gold medal – first place	2019 Lima	Team sprint
Gold medal – first place	2023 Santiago	Keirin
Silver medal – second place	2019 Lima	Sprint
Silver medal – second place	2023 Santiago	Team sprint
Bronze medal – third place	2023 Santiago	Sprint
Pan American Championships
Gold medal – first place	2019 Cochabamba	Keirin
Gold medal – first place	2019 Cochabamba	1 km time trial
Gold medal – first place	2021 Lima	Keirin
Gold medal – first place	2021 Lima	Sprint
Gold medal – first place	2021 Lima	1 km time trial
Gold medal – first place	2021 Lima	Team sprint
Gold medal – first place	2024 Carson	Team sprint
Gold medal – first place	2025 Asunción	Keirin
Silver medal – second place	2018 Aguascalientes	1 km time trial
Silver medal – second place	2018 Aguascalientes	Team sprint
Silver medal – second place	2022 Lima	Keirin
Silver medal – second place	2023 San Juan	Sprint
Silver medal – second place	2024 Carson	Keirin
Silver medal – second place	2025 Asunción	Sprint
Silver medal – second place	2025 Asunción	Team sprint
Silver medal – second place	2026 Santiago	Keirin
Silver medal – second place	2026 Santiago	Team sprint
Bronze medal – third place	2018 Aguascalientes	Keirin
Bronze medal – third place	2018 Aguascalientes	Sprint
Bronze medal – third place	2019 Cochabamba	Sprint
Bronze medal – third place	2022 Lima	Sprint
Bronze medal – third place	2022 Lima	Team sprint
Bronze medal – third place	2023 San Juan	Team sprint
Central American and Caribbean Games
Gold medal – first place	2026 Santo Domingo	Sprint
Silver medal – second place	2018 Barranquilla	1 km time trial
Silver medal – second place	2023 San Salvador	Keirin
Silver medal – second place	2023 San Salvador	Team sprint
Silver medal – second place	2026 Santo Domingo	Team sprint
Bronze medal – third place	2018 Barranquilla	Sprint
Bronze medal – third place	2018 Barranquilla	Team sprint
Bronze medal – third place	2023 San Salvador	Sprint
Bronze medal – third place	2026 Santo Domingo	Keirin
South American Games
Gold medal – first place	2018 Cochabamba	Team sprint
Gold medal – first place	2026 Santa Fe	Sprint
Gold medal – first place	2026 Santa Fe	Team sprint
Bronze medal – third place	2018 Cochabamba	Sprint
Bolivarian Games
Gold medal – first place	2022 Valledupar	Keirin
Gold medal – first place	2022 Valledupar	Sprint
Gold medal – first place	2022 Valledupar	Team sprint
Gold medal – first place	2025 Lima-Ayacucho	Keirin
Gold medal – first place	2025 Lima-Ayacucho	Sprint
Gold medal – first place	2025 Lima-Ayacucho	Team sprint

Kevin Santiago Quintero Chavarro (born 28 October 1998) is a Colombian track cyclist, who specializes in sprinting events. He has won numerous medals in continental games and championships, as well as competed at the 2018, 2019 and 2020 UCI Track Cycling World Championships. He most notably won the Keirin at the 2023 UCI Track Cycling World Championships.

He represented Colombia at the 2020 Summer Olympics.

On 26 June 2024, the Colombian Olympic Committee chose Quintero and javelin thrower Flor Ruiz as the flag bearers to Paris 2024.

He competed in the keirin at the 2024 Summer Olympics.

== Major results ==
2015
2nd Kilometer, Pan American Junior Championships
2016
Pan American Junior Championships

1st Team sprint
1st Kilometer
2nd Sprint
3rd Keirin

3rd Team sprint, National Championships
2017
National Championships

2nd Team sprint
3rd Keirin

2018
South American Games

1st Team sprint
3rd Sprint

National Championships

1st Kilometer
1st Sprint
2nd Team sprint

Central American and Caribbean Games

2nd Kilometer
3rd Sprint
3rd Team sprint

Pan American Championships

2nd Kilometer
2nd Team sprint
3rd Sprint
3rd Keirin

2019
Pan American Games

1st Keirin
1st Team sprint
2nd Sprint

UCI World Cup

1st Keirin, Brisbane
2nd Keirin, Milton

Pan American Championships

1st Keirin
1st Kilometer
3rd Sprint

National Championships

1st Keirin
1st Sprint
2nd Kilometer
2nd Team sprint

2021
Pan American Championships

1st Kilometer
1st Sprint
1st Keirin
1st Team sprint

National Championships

1st Sprint
2nd Kilometer

UCI Nations Cup

1st Overall Keirin
1st Overall Sprint
1st Sprint, St. Petersburg
1st Keirin, Cali
2nd Sprint, Cali
2nd Team sprint, Cali

UCI Champions League

3rd Sprint, Panevėžys
3rd Keirin, London

2022
UCI Nations Cup

1st Overall Keirin
1st Keirin, Milton
2nd Keirin, Glasgow
2nd Team sprint, Cali

Bolivarian Games

1st Keirin
1st Sprint
1st Team sprint

National Championships

1st Sprint
2nd Keirin
3rd Team sprint

Pan American Championships

2nd Keirin
3rd Sprint
3rd Team sprint

3rd Keirin, UCI World Championships
UCI Champions League

3rd Sprint, Berlin

2023
1st Keirin, UCI World Championships
UCI Nations Cup

1st Overall Keirin

Pan American Championships

2nd Sprint
3rd Team sprint

Central American and Caribbean Games

2nd Keirin
2nd Team sprint
3rd Sprint

2026
Pan American Championships

2nd Keirin
2nd Team sprint

Central American and Caribbean Games

1st Sprint
2nd Team sprint
3rd Keirin

South American Games

1st Sprint
1st Team sprint

== See also ==
- List of World Championship medalists in men's keirin
- List of Track Cycling Nations Cup medalists

Olympic Games
Preceded by Laura Gómez; Carlos Andres Quintana	Flagbearer for Colombia; París 2024; With: Flor Ruiz	Succeeded by Incumbent
