= Mathias Guillemette =

Canadian cyclist (born 2002)

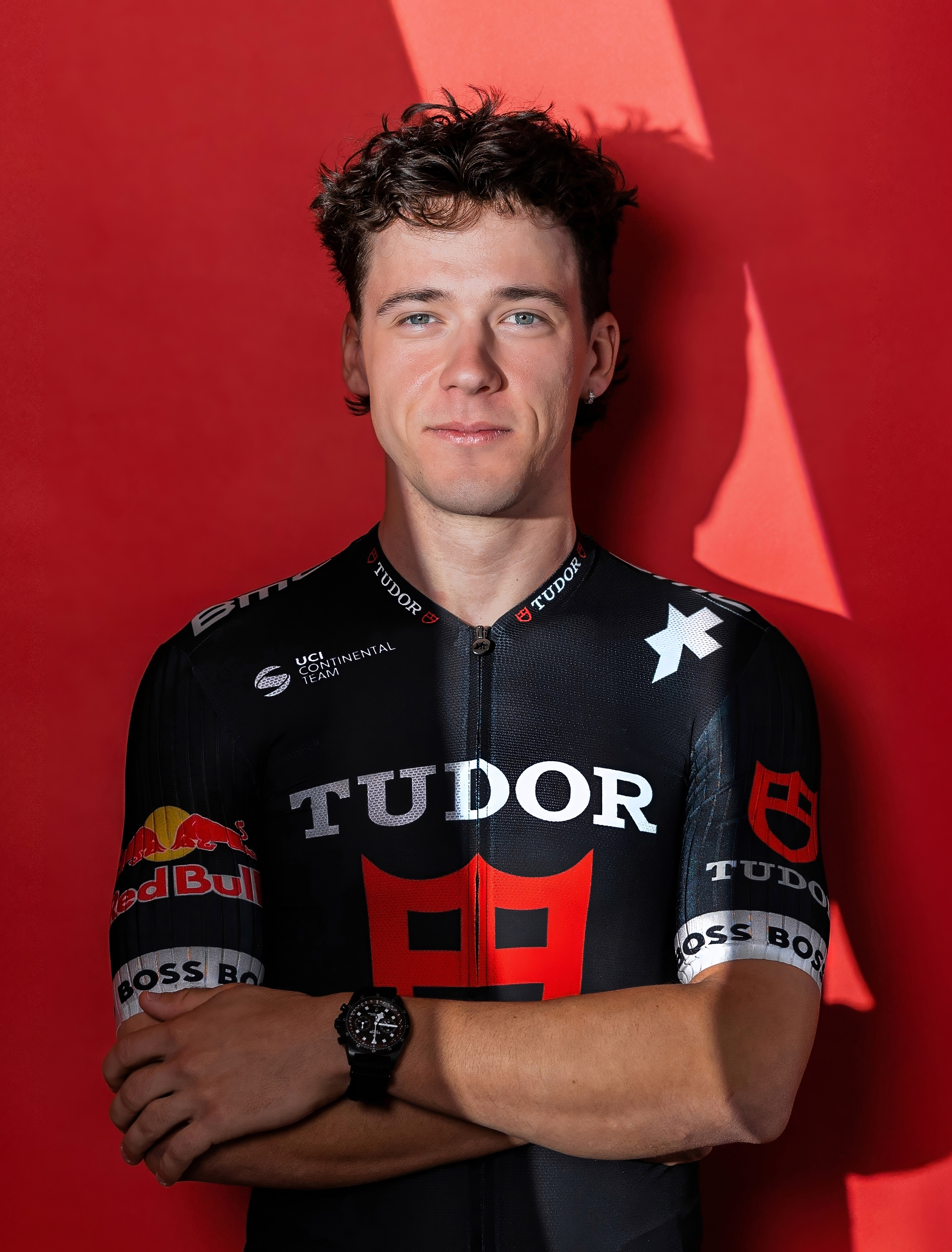
- Guillemette in 2022

Personal information
- Born: 14 January 2002 (age 24) Trois-Rivières, Quebec, Canada
- Height: 1.80 m (5 ft 11 in)
- Weight: 73 kg (161 lb)

Cycling career
- Sport: Cycling
- Disciplines: Track; Road
- Role: Rider

Professional team
- 2021: XSpeed United Continental
Medal record
Men's track cycling
Representing Canada
Pan American Championships
Gold medal – first place	2023 San Juan	Madison
Gold medal – first place	2023 San Juan	Team pursuit
Silver medal – second place	2023 San Juan	Points race

Mathias Guillemette (born 14 January 2002) is a Canadian professional racing cyclist, who specializes in track cycling.

== Major results ==
2021
UCI Nations Cup

2nd Team pursuit, Cali

2022
UCI Champions League

1st Elimination, Palma
2nd Elimination, Paris
2nd Elimination, London I
3rd Elimination, Berlin

National Track Championships

1st Madison (with Dylan Bibic)
2nd Omnium
2nd Team pursuit
3rd Individual pursuit

2023
Pan American Championships

1st Madison (with Dylan Bibic)
1st Team pursuit
2nd Points race

National Track Championships

1st Madison (with Dylan Bibic)
2nd Scratch
