= Dylan Bibic =

Canadian cyclist (born 2003)

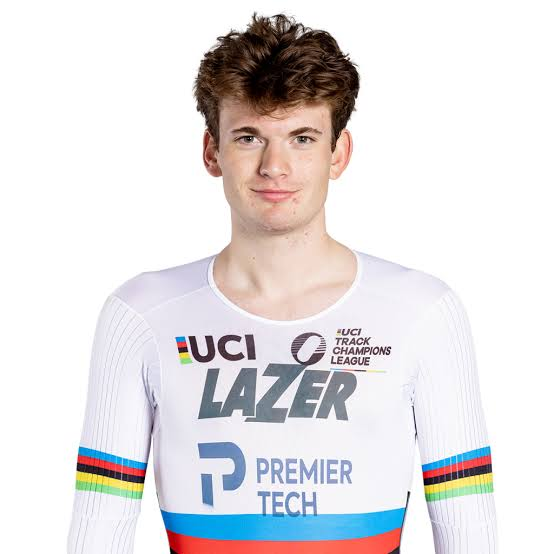
- Bibic in 2023

Personal information
- Born: August 3, 2003 (age 23) Streetsville, Mississauga, Ontario, Canada

Cycling career
- Sport: Cycling
- Current team: NSN Development Team
- Disciplines: Road; Track
- Role: Rider

Amateur teams
- 2019: Ascent Cycling p/b Neworld
- 2021: Cannibal Team

Professional teams
- 2022: Premier Tech U-23 Cycling Project
- 2023–: Israel Premier Tech Academy

Major wins
- Track World Championships Scratch (2022)
Medal record
Men's track cycling
Representing Canada
World Championships
Gold medal – first place	2022 Saint-Quentin-en-Yvelines	Scratch
Silver medal – second place	2023 Glasgow	Elimination
Bronze medal – third place	2024 Ballerup	Elimination
World Junior Championships
Gold medal – first place	2021 Cairo	Points race
Silver medal – second place	2021 Cairo	Omnium
Bronze medal – third place	2021 Cairo	Madison
Pan American Championships
Gold medal – first place	2022 Lima	Omnium
Gold medal – first place	2022 Lima	Madison
Gold medal – first place	2022 Lima	Elimination
Gold medal – first place	2022 Lima	Team pursuit
Silver medal – second place	2022 Lima	Scratch
Gold medal – first place	2023 San Juan	Scratch
Gold medal – first place	2023 San Juan	Elimination
Gold medal – first place	2023 San Juan	Omnium
Gold medal – first place	2023 San Juan	Madison
Gold medal – first place	2023 San Juan	Team pursuit

Dylan Bibic (born August 3, 2003) is a Canadian professional road and track cyclist, who currently rides for UCI Continental team NSN Development Team. He notably won the scratch race at the 2022 UCI Track Cycling World Championships, the first Canadian to win gold in the event, in his world championship debut. He had previously won the men's points race at the UCI Junior Track World Championships.

== Career ==
In 2024 Bibic was named to Canada's 2024 Olympic team in the track discipline.

== Major results ==
=== Track ===
2021
UCI World Junior Championships

1st Points race
2nd Omnium
3rd Madison

National Junior Championships

1st Madison
1st Elimination
1st Individual pursuit
1st Scratch
1st Points race
1st Keirin
1st Sprint
1st Kilo
1st Team pursuit
1st Team sprint

2022
1st Scratch, UCI World Championships
Pan American Championships

1st Omnium
1st Madison (with Michael Foley)
1st Elimination
1st Team Pursuit
2nd Scratch

National Championships

1st Madison (with Mathias Guillemette)
1st Omnium

UCI Champions League

1st Elimination race, Berlin
2nd Scratch, London

2023
National Championships

1st Madison (with Mathias Guillemette)
1st Omnium
1st Scratch

Pan American Championships

1st Omnium
1st Madison (with Mathias Guillemette)
1st Elimination
1st Scratch
1st Team pursuit

2nd Elimination, UCI World Championships
UCI Champions League

1st Overall UCI Track Champions League Endurance
1st Elimination, Mallorca
1st Scratch, Berlin
1st Elimination, Saint-Quentin-en-Yvelines
1st Scratch, Saint-Quentin-en-Yvelines
2nd Scratch, London

2024
National Championships

1st Madison (with Mathias Guillemette)
1st Omnium
1st Points race
1st Elimination
3rd Kilo

3rd Elimination, UCI World Championships

=== Road ===
2019
3rd Time trial, National Junior Championships
