= Martha Bayona =

Colombian track cyclist (born 1995)

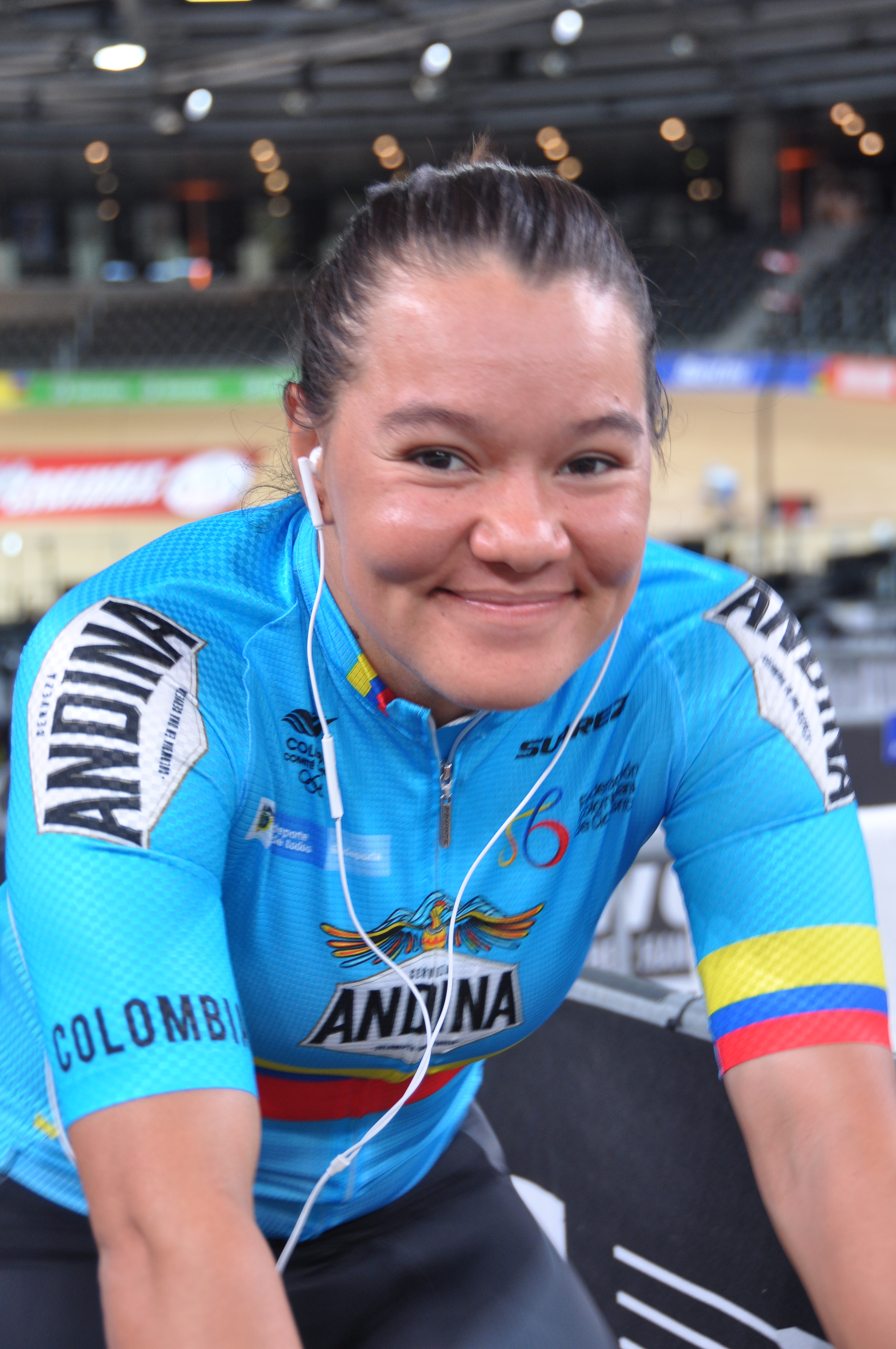
- Martha Bayona in 2020

Personal information
- Full name: Martha Bayona Pineda
- Born: 12 August 1995 (age 31) Bucaramanga, Colombia
- Height: 1.56 m (5 ft 1 in)
- Weight: 58 kg (128 lb)

Cycling career
- Sport: Cycling
- Discipline: Track cycling
- Role: Rider
- Rider type: Sprinter
Medal record
Representing Colombia
Women's track cycling
Event	1st	2nd	3rd
World Championships	0	2	0
Nations Cup	8	0	2
Nations Cup stage	10	6	3
Champions League	0	0	2
Champions League stage	3	8	8
Pan American Games	3	1	1
Pan American Championships	11	9	6
CAC Games	1	3	2
South American Games	3	0	0
Bolivarian Games	7	0	0
Total	46	29	24
World Championships
Silver medal – second place	2017 Hong Kong	Keirin
Silver medal – second place	2023 Glasgow	Keirin
Nations Cup
Gold medal – first place	2021	Keirin
Gold medal – first place	2021	Sprint
Gold medal – first place	2021	500 m time trial
Gold medal – first place	2021	Team sprint
Gold medal – first place	2022	Keirin
Gold medal – first place	2022	Sprint
Gold medal – first place	2022	500 m time trial
Gold medal – first place	2023	Sprint
Bronze medal – third place	2023	Keirin
World Cup
Bronze medal – third place	2019–20	Keirin
Champions League
Bronze medal – third place	2023	Sprint
Bronze medal – third place	2024	Sprint
Pan American Games
Gold medal – first place	2019 Lima	Keirin
Gold medal – first place	2023 Santiago	Keirin
Gold medal – first place	2023 Santiago	Sprint
Silver medal – second place	2019 Lima	Sprint
Bronze medal – third place	2019 Lima	Team sprint
Pan American Championships
Gold medal – first place	2013 Mexico City	Team sprint
Gold medal – first place	2017 Couva	Keirin
Gold medal – first place	2018 Aguascalientes	Keirin
Gold medal – first place	2021 Lima	Sprint
Gold medal – first place	2021 Lima	500 m time trial
Gold medal – first place	2021 Lima	Team sprint
Gold medal – first place	2022 Lima	500 m time trial
Gold medal – first place	2023 San Juan	Keirin
Gold medal – first place	2023 San Juan	500 m time trial
Gold medal – first place	2024 Carson	Keirin
Gold medal – first place	2024 Carson	500 m time trial
Silver medal – second place	2015 Santiago	Keirin
Silver medal – second place	2015 Santiago	Team sprint
Silver medal – second place	2016 Aguascalientes	500 m time trial
Silver medal – second place	2016 Aguascalientes	Team sprint
Silver medal – second place	2017 Couva	500 m time trial
Silver medal – second place	2019 Cochabamba	Keirin
Silver medal – second place	2019 Cochabamba	Sprint
Silver medal – second place	2019 Cochabamba	500 m time trial
Silver medal – second place	2021 Lima	Keirin
Bronze medal – third place	2016 Aguascalientes	Keirin
Bronze medal – third place	2018 Aguascalientes	Sprint
Bronze medal – third place	2018 Aguascalientes	500 m time trial
Bronze medal – third place	2019 Cochabamba	Team sprint
Bronze medal – third place	2022 Lima	Team sprint
Bronze medal – third place	2024 Carson	Sprint
Central American and Caribbean Games
Gold medal – first place	2023 San Salvador	Keirin
Silver medal – second place	2018 Barranquilla	Sprint
Silver medal – second place	2023 San Salvador	Sprint
Silver medal – second place	2023 San Salvador	Team sprint
Bronze medal – third place	2018 Barranquilla	Keirin
Bronze medal – third place	2018 Barranquilla	500 m time trial
South American Games
Gold medal – first place	2018 Cochabamba	Keirin
Gold medal – first place	2018 Cochabamba	Sprint
Gold medal – first place	2018 Cochabamba	Team sprint
Bolivarian Games
Gold medal – first place	2017 Santa Marta	Keirin
Gold medal – first place	2017 Santa Marta	Sprint
Gold medal – first place	2017 Santa Marta	500 m time trial
Gold medal – first place	2017 Santa Marta	Team sprint
Gold medal – first place	2022 Valledupar	Keirin
Gold medal – first place	2022 Valledupar	Sprint
Gold medal – first place	2022 Valledupar	Team sprint

Martha Bayona Pineda (born 12 August 1995) is a Colombian track cyclist. She represented her nation at the 2015 UCI Track Cycling World Championships, and also finished tenth in the women's keirin at the 2016 Summer Olympics.

== Doping Suspension ==
On 6 February 2026, the International Testing Agency reported that the UCI, the sport's governing body, suspended Martha Bayona Pineda for 18 months. The UCI Anti-Doping Tribunal found Martha Bayona Pineda guilty of an Anti-Doping Rule Violation (ADRV) due to three whereabouts failures committed within a 12-month period, in accordance with the World Anti-Doping Code and the UCI Anti-Doping Rules. The period of ineligibility began on 23 April 2025 and will remain in effect until 22 October 2026.

== Career results ==
2015
Pan American Track Championships

2nd Keirin
2nd Team Sprint (with Juliana Gaviria)

Copa Cuba de Pista

2nd Team Sprint (with Angie Sol Roa)
2nd 500m Time Trial

2016
Pan American Track Championships

2nd 500m Time Trial
2nd Team Sprint (with Juliana Gaviria
3rd Keirin

GP von Deutschland im Sprint

3rd Keirin
3rd Team Sprint (with Juliana Gaviria)

3rd Keirin, Cottbuser SprintCup
2017
2nd Keirin, UCI World Track Championships
