= Ellesse Andrews =

New Zealand cyclist (born 1999)

Ellesse Andrews MNZM
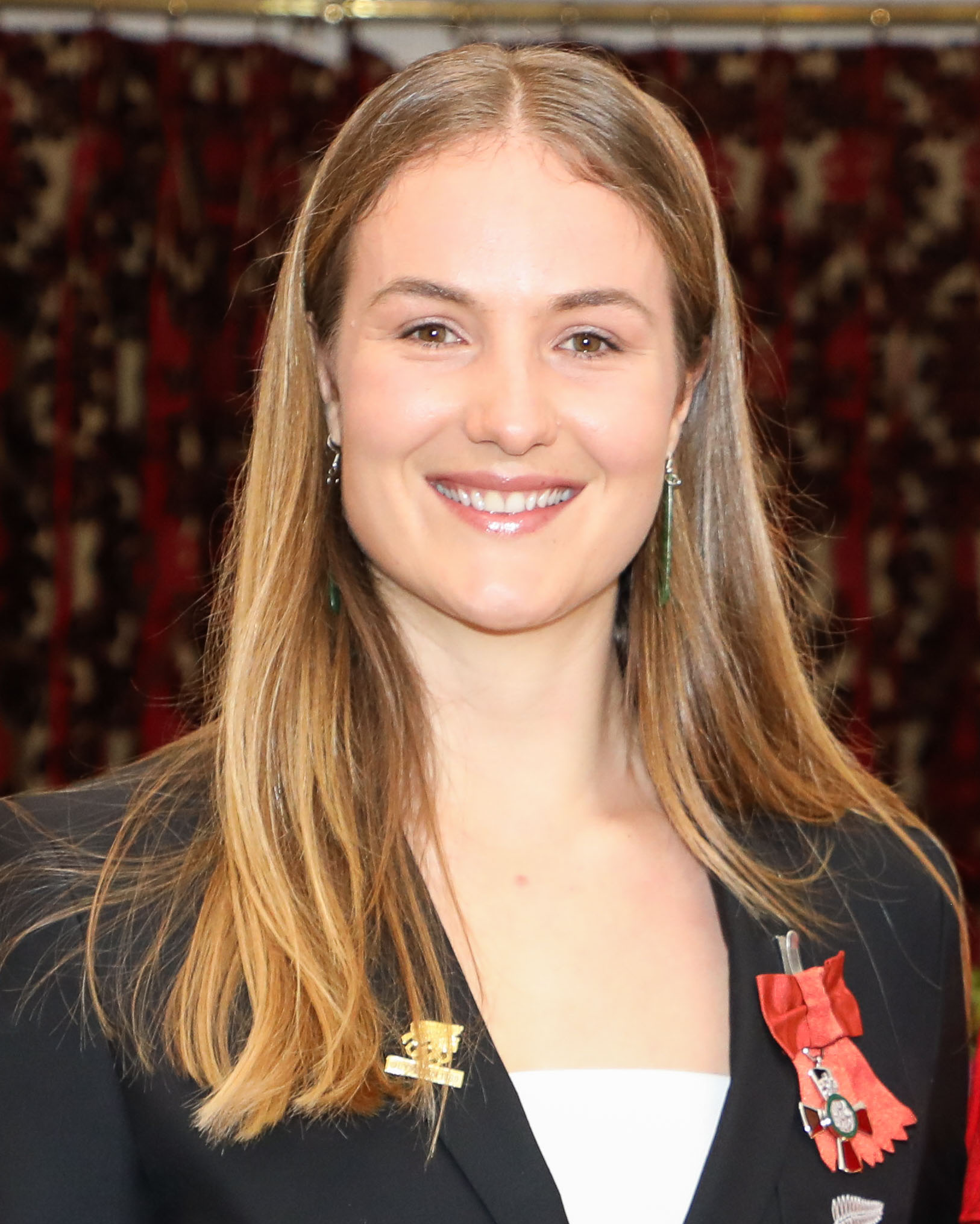
- Andrews in 2025

Personal information
- Full name: Ellesse Mote Andrews
- Born: 31 December 1999 (age 26) Christchurch, New Zealand
- Height: 1.77 m (5 ft 10 in)
- Weight: 72 kg (159 lb)

Cycling career
- Sport: Cycling
- Discipline: Track
- Role: Rider
- Rider type: Sprinter
Medal record
Women's track cycling
Representing New Zealand
Olympic Games
Gold medal – first place	2024 Paris	Sprint
Gold medal – first place	2024 Paris	Keirin
Silver medal – second place	2020 Tokyo	Keirin
Silver medal – second place	2024 Paris	Team sprint
World Championships
Gold medal – first place	2023 Glasgow	Keirin
Bronze medal – third place	2023 Glasgow	Sprint
Bronze medal – third place	2025 Santiago	1 km time trial
Commonwealth Games
Gold medal – first place	2022 Birmingham	Team sprint
Gold medal – first place	2022 Birmingham	Sprint
Gold medal – first place	2022 Birmingham	Keirin
Silver medal – second place	2022 Birmingham	Team pursuit
Junior World Championships
Gold medal – first place	2016 Aigle	Team sprint
Gold medal – first place	2017 Montichiari	Individual pursuit
Silver medal – second place	2017 Montichiari	Team pursuit
Bronze medal – third place	2016 Aigle	Individual pursuit
Oceania Track Cycling Championships
Gold medal – first place	2019 Adelaide	Individual pursuit
Gold medal – first place	2020 Invercargill	Keirin
Gold medal – first place	2022 Brisbane	Sprint
Gold medal – first place	2022 Brisbane	Keirin
Gold medal – first place	2022 Brisbane	Team Sprint
Gold medal – first place	2023 Brisbane	Sprint
Silver medal – second place	2023 Brisbane	Keirin
Silver medal – second place	2023 Brisbane	Team Sprint

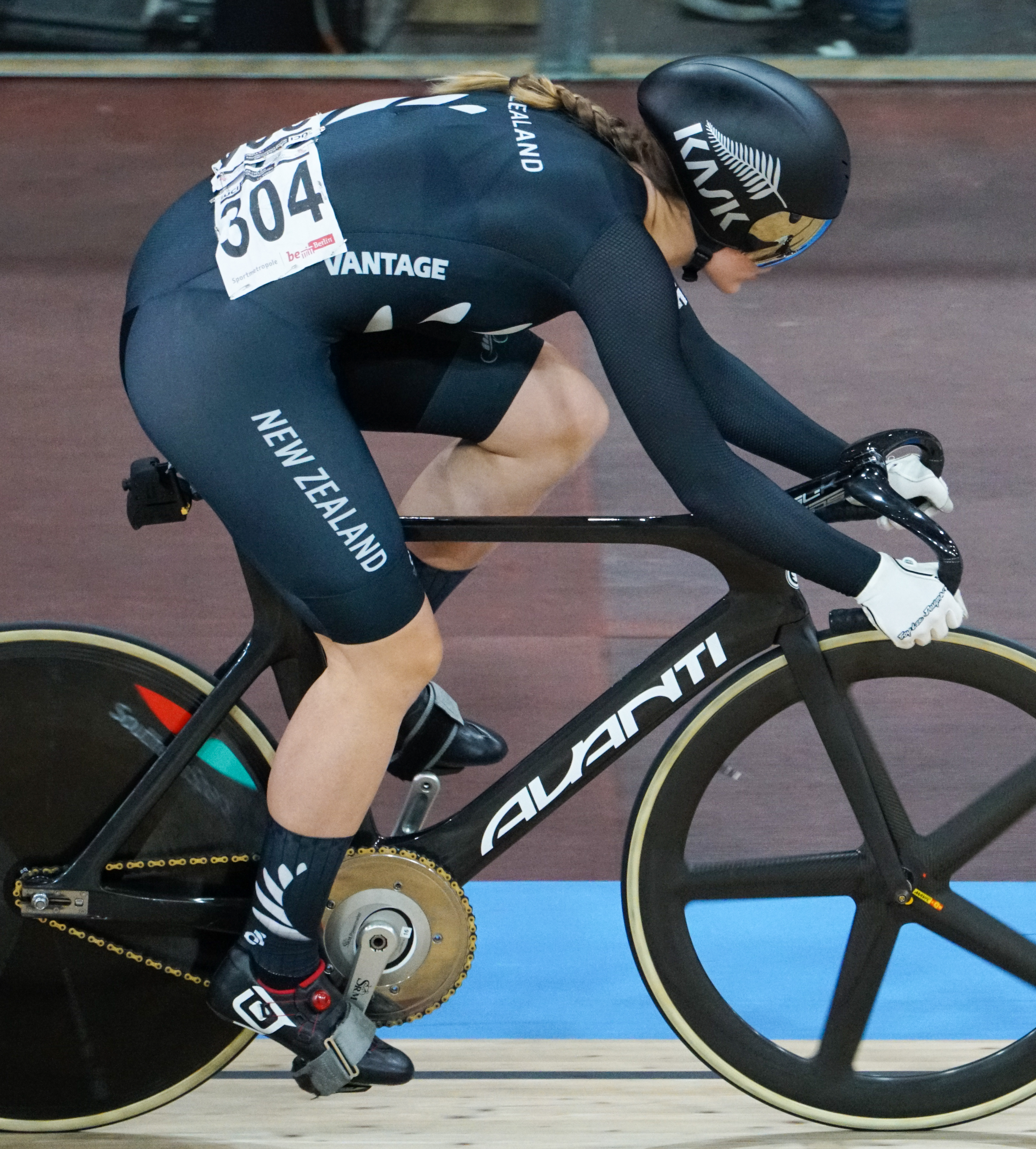
Andrews in 2020

Ellesse Mote Andrews MNZM (born 31 December 1999) is a New Zealand racing cyclist. She represented New Zealand at the 2018 Commonwealth Games and the 2020 Summer Olympics, where she gained a silver medal in the keirin. At the 2024 Summer Olympics, she earned two gold medals for winning the keirin and sprint, as well as a silver medal in the team sprint.

== Early life ==
Andrews was born in Christchurch Women's Hospital at 23:45 on 31 December 1999, fifteen minutes short of the year 2000. Her father is Olympic cyclist Jon Andrews, who represented New Zealand at the 1990 Commonwealth Games and 1992 Summer Olympics. Her mother is Angela Mote-Andrews, who competed internationally in mountain biking. Mote-Andrews was preparing herself for her inaugural participation at world championships—the 1999 UCI Mountain Bike World Championships in Åre, Sweden—when she got pregnant. She has one younger sister.

Andrews grew up in Wānaka and attended Mount Aspiring College until the end of Year 11 before moving to St Peter's School in Cambridge for the final two years of secondary school.

== Cycling career ==
Andrews started cycling competitively aged 14, initially mountain biking but she soon changed to track cycling. She asked her father to pay for dance classes and a deal was made that they would do more cycling. Shortly afterwards, her father bought her a track bike, which got her into track cycling.

Andrews won four medals, including two gold at the UCI Junior Track Cycling World Championships. Competing in the Izu Velodrome, she won a silver medal at the 2020 Tokyo Olympics keirin. She had to go through the repechage to progress to quarter and semi finals. In the final, she moved into second place with two laps to go and held that place.

At the 2024 Paris Olympics, Andrews became the first woman to win the Olympic gold medal in both the keirin and the sprint at the same games. She had earlier won the silver medal in the team sprint event, alongside Rebecca Petch and Shaane Fulton.

== Major results ==
2016
UCI Junior World Track Cycling Championships

1st Team sprint
3rd Individual pursuit

2017
UCI Junior World Track Cycling Championships

1st Individual pursuit (Note: In the qualifying round, Andrews clocked a 2:18.080 world junior record)
2nd Team pursuit

2018
Oceania Track Cycling Championships

1st Individual pursuit

2019
UCI Track Cycling World Cup

3rd Team Pursuit (Hong Kong)

2021
Tokyo Olympic Games

2nd Keirin

2022
Birmingham Commonwealth Games

1st Sprint
1st Team sprint
1st Keirin
2nd Team pursuit

2023
UCI Track Cycling World Championships

1st Keirin
3rd Sprint

2024
Paris Olympic Games

1st Sprint
1st Keirin
2nd Team Sprint

== Honours and awards ==
Andrews won Secondary School Sportswoman of the Year at the February 2018 Waikato Regional Sports Awards. A week later, she won the Emerging Talent award at the Halberg Awards.

In the 2025 King's Birthday Honours, Andrews was appointed a Member of the New Zealand Order of Merit, for services to cycling.

== Notes ==
Awards
Preceded by Campbell Stewart	Halberg Awards – Emerging Talent Award; 2017	Succeeded by Maddi Wesche
