= Claudio Imhof =

Swiss bicycle racer (born 1990)

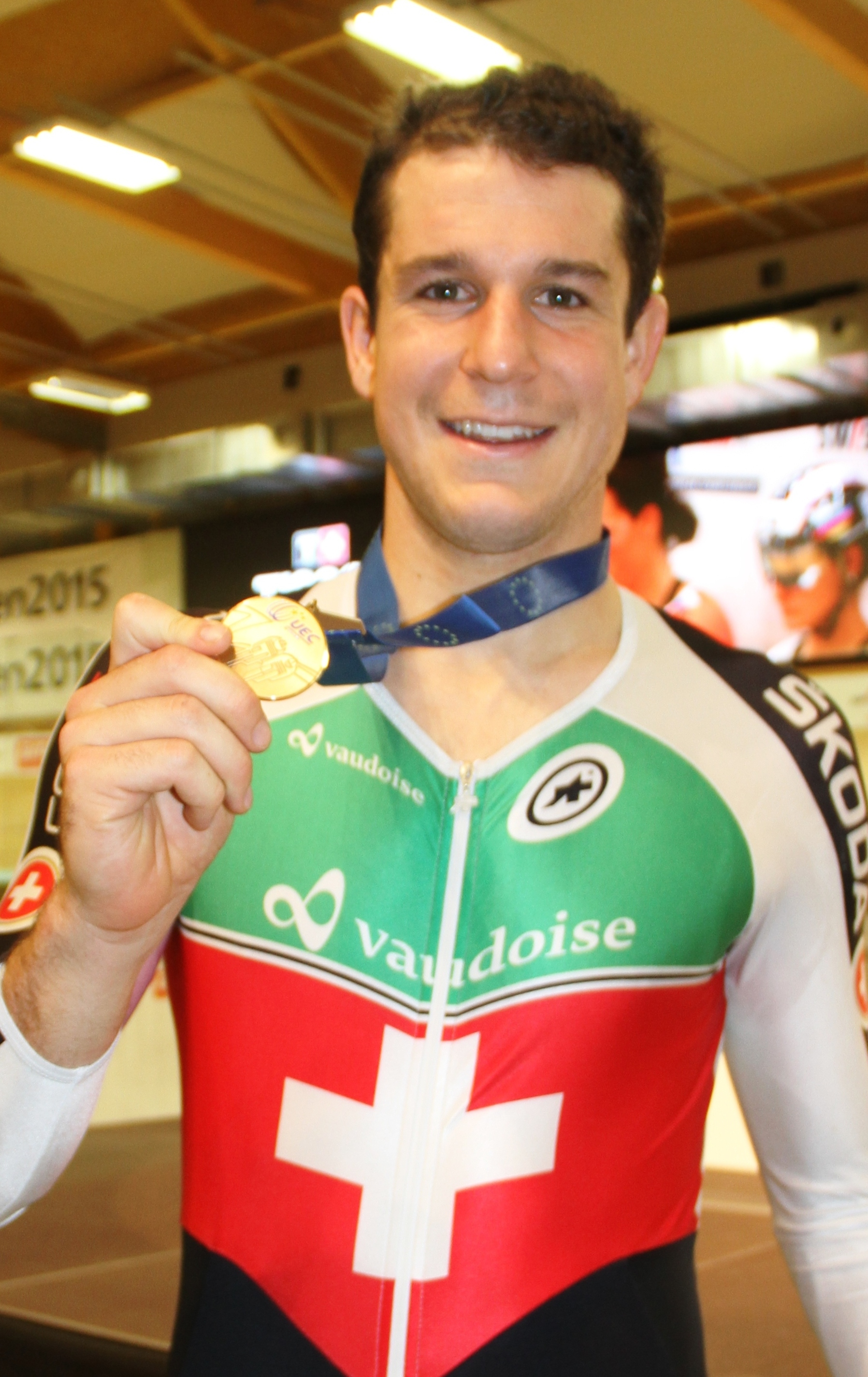
- Imhof at the 2015 UEC European Track Championships

Personal information
- Full name: Claudio Imhof
- Born: 26 September 1990 (age 36) Münsterlingen, Switzerland

Cycling career
- Sport: Cycling
- Disciplines: Track; Road
- Role: Rider

Amateur teams
- 2014: VC Mendrisio–PL Valli
- 2015: Surgtech–Lerch und Partner
- 2016–2018: VC Hirslanden
- 2022: Bischibikes–Tobler Racing

Professional teams
- 2012: Team Vorarlberg
- 2013: Atlas Personal–Jakroo
- 2014: IAM Cycling (stagiaire)
- 2019: Akros–Thömus
- 2020: Team Vorarlberg Santic
Medal record
Representing Switzerland
Men's track cycling
World Championships
Bronze medal – third place	2016 London	Scratch
European Games
Bronze medal – third place	2019 Minsk	Individual pursuit
Bronze medal – third place	2019 Minsk	Team pursuit
European Championships
Silver medal – second place	2011 Apeldoorn	Madison
Silver medal – second place	2018 Glasgow	Team pursuit
Silver medal – second place	2021 Grenchen	Team pursuit
Bronze medal – third place	2015 Grenchen	Points race
Bronze medal – third place	2018 Glasgow	Individual pursuit
Bronze medal – third place	2020 Plovdiv	Team pursuit
Bronze medal – third place	2021 Grenchen	Individual pursuit
Junior World Championships
Bronze medal – third place	2008 Cape Town	Madison
U23 & Junior European Championships
Gold medal – first place	2008 Pruszków	Junior Scratch
Men's road cycling
Representing Switzerland
European Championships
Silver medal – second place	2020 Plouay	Mixed relay

Claudio Imhof (born 26 September 1990) is a Swiss road and track cyclist, who most recently rode for UCI Continental team Team Vorarlberg Santic.

As a junior, he won the gold medal in the scratch at the 2008 UEC European Track Championships. He competed at the 2011 and 2012 UCI Track Cycling World Championships. At the European championships he won the silver medal in the Men's madison at the 2011 UEC European Track Championships together with Cyrille Thièry and the bronze medal in the points race at the 2015 UEC European Track Championships in Grenchen, Switzerland.

== Major results ==
=== Road ===
2007
1st Stage 4 Grand Prix Rüebliland
2008
9th Overall Tour du Pays de Vaud

1st Points classification
1st Stage 3a

2012
2nd Giro del Mendrisiotto
2019
2nd Overall Rhône-Alpes Isère Tour

1st Stage 1

2020
2nd Team relay, UEC European Championships

=== Track ===
2008
1st Scratch, UEC European Junior Championships
1st UIV Cup Zurich (with Silvan Dillier)
3rd Madison, UCI Junior World Championships
3rd Madison, National Championships
2009
National Championships

1st Team pursuit
3rd Madison

2010
2nd Madison, National Championships
2011
National Championships

1st Madison (with Silvan Dillier)
2nd Team pursuit
3rd Omnium

2nd Madison, UEC European Championships
2010–11 UCI World Cup Classics

3rd Points race, Beijing

2013
1st Madison (with Olivier Beer), National Championships
2014
3rd Omnium, National Championships
2015
National Championships

2nd Individual pursuit
2nd Stayer
2nd Scratch

3rd Points race, UEC European Championships
2016
National Championships

1st Individual pursuit
1st Stayer
2nd Points race

3rd Scratch, UCI World Championships
2017
National Championships

1st Madison (with Tristan Marguet)
1st Team pursuit
2nd Individual pursuit

2017–18 UCI World Cup

3rd Omnium, Pruszków

2018
National Championships

1st Madison (with Tristan Marguet)
1st Individual pursuit
1st Omnium

UEC European Championships

2nd Team pursuit
3rd Individual pursuit

2019
2018–19 UCI World Cup

1st Omnium, Cambridge
3rd Team pursuit, Cambridge

2019–20 UCI World Cup

1st Team pursuit, Cambridge
3rd Team pursuit, Brisbane

European Games

3rd Individual pursuit
3rd Team pursuit

2020
National Championships

1st Points race
1st Individual pursuit

3rd Team pursuit, UEC European Championships
2021
UCI Champions League

1st Scratch, London

National Championships

1st Elimination race
1st Individual pursuit
2nd Points race

UEC European Championships

2nd Team pursuit
3rd Individual pursuit

UCI Nations Cup

3rd Omnium, St Petersburg

2022
1st Overall Endurance, UCI Champions League

2nd Scratch, Berlin
2nd Scratch, Paris
2nd Elimination, London II
3rd Elimination, Paris

2nd Elimination race, National Championships
