= Sarah Van Dam =

Canadian cyclist

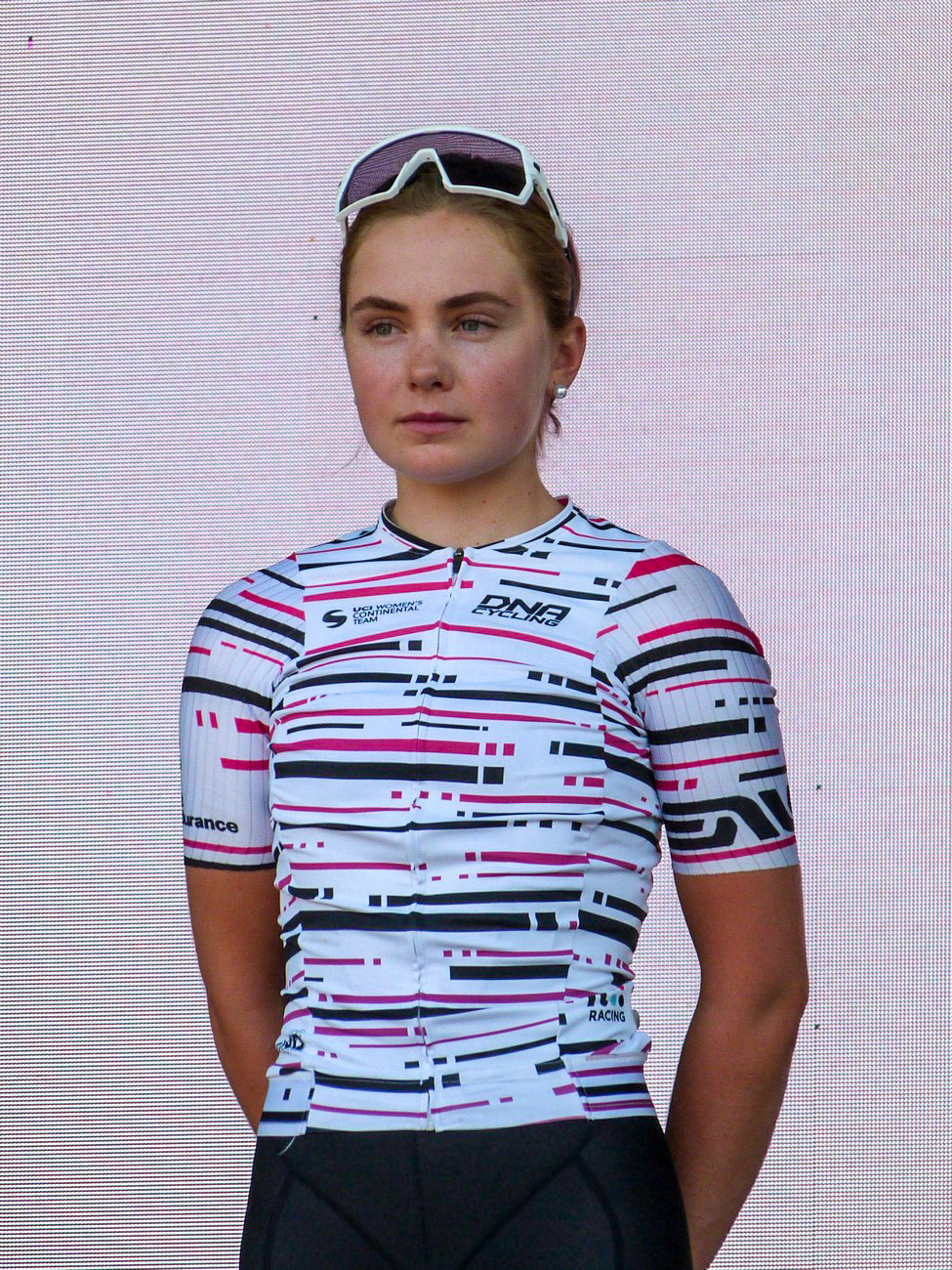
- Van Dam in 2024

Personal information
- Born: 4 December 2001 (age 24) Victoria, British Columbia, Canada
- Height: 1.62 m (5 ft 4 in)
- Weight: 58 kg (128 lb)

Cycling career
- Sport: Cycling
- Current team: Visma–Lease a Bike
- Disciplines: Track, Road

Professional teams
- 2023–2024: DNA Pro Cycling
- 2025: Ceratizit Pro Cycling
- 2026-: Visma–Lease a Bike
Medal record
Women's track cycling
Representing Canada
Pan American Championships
Gold medal – first place	2022 Lima	Elimination race
Gold medal – first place	2022 Lima	Team pursuit
Gold medal – first place	2022 Lima	Omnium
Gold medal – first place	2022 Lima	Madison
Bronze medal – third place	2022 Lima	Scratch
Bronze medal – third place	2022 Lima	Points race

Sarah Van Dam (born 4 December 2001) is a Canadian track and road cyclist, who rides for UCI Women's WorldTeam Visma–Lease a Bike.

== Early life ==
Van Dam began cycle racing in 2013 and attended Tripleshot Youth Cycling Club. She attended Oak Bay High School and the Canadian Sport School Victoria. She won seven national junior titles at the 2018 Canadian Junior Track Championships held in Milton, Ontario. She also made the podium at the Canadian junior road championships. In 2019, aged 17 years-old, she joined Trek Red Truck Racing.

== Career ==
Van Dam won four gold medals at the 2022 Pan American Track Cycling Championships in Lima, Peru in 2022, winning gold in the Madison, omnium, team pursuit and elimination race. She represented Canada at the 2022 UCI Track Cycling World Championships in October 2022, at the Vélodrome National in Saint-Quentin-en-Yvelines, France. In November 2022, at the same track in France she was involved in a crash involving Lea Lin Teutenberg and Rachele Barbieri which left her having to pull a sizeable wooden splinter from her arm. In July 2024, Van Dam qualified to compete for Canada at the 2024 Summer Olympics in track cycling.

In 2025, Van Dam finished third at Itzulia Women, after finishing in the top five on all three stages.

== Major results ==
2026
5th Tour Down Under
6th Cadel Evans Great Ocean Road Race
7th Overall Tour de Suisse
