= UEC European Track Championships – Men's team sprint =

UEC European Champion jersey

The Men's team sprint at the European Track Championships was first competed in 2010 in Poland.

The Team sprint consists of a qualifying, followed by a final and the race for the bronze medal.

Netherlands have been the most successful nation in the event at this level, winning the title seven times. Jeffrey Hoogland is the only ever-present rider for those seven titles, so is individually the most successful rider, with one more win than his colleagues Harrie Lavreysen and Roy van den Berg. The specific team of Hoogland, Lavreysen and van den Berg have won the title six times.

== Medalists ==
Championships	Gold	Silver	Bronze
2010 Pruszków	Germany; Robert Förstemann; Maximilian Levy; Stefan Nimke	France; Michaël D'Almeida; François Pervis; Kévin Sireau	Great Britain; Matthew Crampton; Chris Hoy; Jason Kenny
2011 Apeldoorn	Germany; René Enders; Robert Förstemann; Stefan Nimke	France; Mickaël Bourgain; François Pervis; Kévin Sireau	Poland; Maciej Bielecki; Kamil Kuczyński; Damian Zieliński
2012 Panevėžys	Germany; Tobias Wächter; Joachim Eilers; Max Niederlag	Poland; Kamil Kuczyński; Maciej Bielecki; Krzysztof Maksel	Great Britain; Matthew Crampton; Callum Skinner; Lewis Oliva
2013 Apeldoorn	Germany; René Enders; Robert Förstemann; Maximilian Levy	France; Grégory Baugé; Michaël D'Almeida; François Pervis	Russia; Denis Dmitriev; Andrey Kubeev; Pavel Yakushevskiy
2014 Guadeloupe	Germany; Robert Förstemann; Tobias Wächter; Joachim Eilers	France; Grégory Baugé; Kévin Sireau; Michaël D'Almeida	Russia; Pavel Yakushevskiy; Denis Dmitriev; Nikita Shurshin
2015 Grenchen	Netherlands; Nils van 't Hoenderdaal; Jeffrey Hoogland; Hugo Haak	Poland; Grzegorz Drejgier; Rafał Sarnecki; Krzysztof Maksel	Germany; Joachim Eilers; Max Niederlag; Robert Förstemann; Maximilian Levy
2016 Saint-Quentin-en-Yvelines	Poland; Maciej Bielecki; Kamil Kuczyński; Mateusz Rudyk; Mateusz Lipa	United Kingdom; Jack Carlin; Ryan Owens; Joseph Truman	Germany; Eric Engler; Jan May; Robert Förstemann
2017 Berlin	France; Benjamin Edelin; Sebastien Vigier; Quentin Lafargue	Germany; Maximilian Levy; Joachim Eilers; Robert Förstemann	Netherlands; Harrie Lavreysen; Jeffrey Hoogland; Matthijs Büchli
2018 Glasgow	Netherlands; Harrie Lavreysen; Jeffrey Hoogland; Roy van den Berg	France; François Pervis; Sebastien Vigier; Quentin Lafargue	Germany; Stefan Bötticher; Joachim Eilers; Timo Bichler
2019 Apeldoorn	Netherlands; Harrie Lavreysen; Jeffrey Hoogland; Roy van den Berg; Matthijs Büchli	United Kingdom; Jack Carlin; Jason Kenny; Ryan Owens	France; Grégory Baugé; Quentin Lafargue; Sebastien Vigier; Melvin Landerneau
2020 Plovdiv	Russia; Denis Dmitriev; Pavel Yakushevskiy; Ivan Gladyshev; Alexander Sharapov	Czech Republic; Tomáš Bábek; Dominik Topinka; Martin Čechman; Jakub Šťastný	Greece; Sotirios Bretas; Ioannis Kalogeropoulos; Konstantinos Livanos
2021 Grenchen	Netherlands; Harrie Lavreysen; Jeffrey Hoogland; Roy van den Berg; Sam Ligtlee	France; Timmy Gillion; Rayan Helal; Sebastien Vigier	Poland; Maciej Bielecki; Patryk Rajkowski; Mateusz Rudyk; Daniel Rochna
2022 Munich	Netherlands; Harrie Lavreysen; Jeffrey Hoogland; Roy van den Berg	France; Timmy Gillion; Rayan Helal; Sebastien Vigier; Melvin Landerneau	United Kingdom; Jack Carlin; Alistair Fielding; Hamish Turnbull
2023 Grenchen	Netherlands; Harrie Lavreysen; Jeffrey Hoogland; Roy van den Berg; Tijmen van Loon	United Kingdom; Jack Carlin; Alistair Fielding; Hamish Turnbull; Joseph Truman	France; Timmy Gillion; Sebastien Vigier; Melvin Landerneau
2024 Apeldoorn	Netherlands; Jeffrey Hoogland; Harrie Lavreysen; Roy van den Berg; Tijmen van Loon	France; Florian Grengbo; Rayan Helal; Sébastien Vigier	Poland; Daniel Rochna; Mateusz Rudyk; Rafał Sarnecki; Maciej Bielecki
2025 Heusden-Zolder	France; Timmy Gillion; Rayan Helal; Sébastien Vigier	Netherlands; Harrie Lavreysen; Loris Leneman; Tijmen van Loon	United Kingdom; Harry Ledingham-Horn; Hayden Norris; Harry Radford
2026 Konya	France; Timmy Gillion; Rayan Helal; Étienne Oliviero; Tom Derache	United Kingdom; Matthew Richardson; Joseph Truman; Hamish Turnbull; Harry Radford	Italy; Matteo Bianchi; Stefano Minuta; Mattia Predomo
