= 2022 UCI Track Cycling World Championships – Men's team sprint =

Men's team sprint at the 2022 UCI Track Cycling World Championships
- Venue: Vélodrome National
- Location: Saint-Quentin-en-Yvelines, France
- Dates: 12 October
- Competitors: 55 from 17 nations
- Teams: 17
- Winning time: 41.600

Medalists
gold medal	Matthew Glaetzer; Leigh Hoffman; Matthew Richardson; Thomas Cornish	Australia
silver medal	Roy van den Berg; Harrie Lavreysen; Jeffrey Hoogland	Netherlands
bronze medal	Alistair Fielding; Hamish Turnbull; Jack Carlin	Great Britain

The Men's team sprint competition at the 2022 UCI Track Cycling World Championships was held on 12 October 2022.

== Results ==
=== Qualifying ===
The qualifying was started at 19:05. The best eight teams advanced to the first round.

Rank	Nation	Time	Behind	Notes
1	Australia; Leigh Hoffman; Matthew Richardson; Thomas Cornish	41.896		Q
2	Netherlands; Roy van den Berg; Harrie Lavreysen; Jeffrey Hoogland	41.993	+0.097	Q
3	France; Timmy Gillion; Sébastien Vigier; Melvin Landerneau	42.852	+0.956	Q
4	Great Britain; Alistair Fielding; Hamish Turnbull; Jack Carlin	43.094	+1.198	Q
5	Poland; Rafał Sarnecki; Mateusz Rudyk; Patryk Rajkowski	43.220	+1.324	Q
6	Germany; Nik Schröter; Stefan Bötticher; Maximilian Dörnbach	43.228	+1.332	Q
7	China; Guo Shuai; Zhou Yu; Liu Qi	43.398	+1.502	Q
8	Canada; Tyler Rorke; Nick Wammes; James Hedgcock	43.707	+1.811	Q
9	Czech Republic; Matěj Bohuslávek; Martin Čechman; Tomáš Bábek	44.221	+2.325	
10	Colombia; Santiago Ramírez; Kevin Quintero; Cristian Ortega	44.331	+2.435	
11	Malaysia; Muhammad Ridwan Sahrom; Muhammad Shah Firdaus Sahrom; Muhammad Fadhil Mohd Zonis	44.417	+2.521	
12	Italy; Matteo Tugnolo; Daniele Napolitano; Matteo Bianchi	44.558	+2.662	
13	Lithuania; Laurynas Vinskas; Vasilijus Lendel; Svajūnas Jonauskas	44.705	+2.809	
14	Spain; José Moreno; Alejandro Martínez; Ekain Jiménez	45.196	+3.300	
15	United States; Dalton Walters; Evan Boone; Geneway Tang	45.483	+3.587	
16	India; Rojit Singh Yanglem; David Elkathchoongo; Esow Alben	45.579	+3.683	
—	Japan; Yoshitaku Nagasako; Kaiya Ota; Yuta Obara	Disqualified		

=== First round ===
The first round was started at 20:31.

First round heats were held as follows:
Heat 1: 4th v 5th fastest
Heat 2: 3rd v 6th fastest
Heat 3: 2nd v 7th fastest
Heat 4: 1st v 8th fastest

The heat winners were ranked on time, from which the top two advanced to the gold medal race and the other two proceeded to the bronze medal race.

Heat	Rank	Nation	Time	Behind	Notes
1	1	Great Britain; Jack Carlin; Alistair Fielding; Hamish Turnbull	42.747		QB
1	2	Poland; Patryk Rajkowski; Mateusz Rudyk; Rafał Sarnecki	42.879	+0.132	
2	1	Germany; Stefan Bötticher; Maximilian Dörnbach; Nik Schröter	43.003		QB
2	2	France; Timmy Gillion; Rayan Helal; Sébastien Vigier	43.063	+0.060	
3	1	Netherlands; Jeffrey Hoogland; Harrie Lavreysen; Roy van den Berg	41.747		QG
3	2	China; Guo Shuai; Xue Chenxi; Zhou Yu	43.459	+1.712	
4	1	Australia; Matthew Glaetzer; Leigh Hoffman; Matthew Richardson	41.630		QG
4	2	Canada; Ryan Dodyk; Tyler Rorke; Nick Wammes	43.717	+2.087	

=== Finals ===
The first round were held at 21:26.

Rank	Nation	Time	Behind	Notes
Gold medal race
1st place, gold medalist(s)	Australia; Matthew Glaetzer; Leigh Hoffman; Matthew Richardson	41.600		
2nd place, silver medalist(s)	Netherlands; Jeffrey Hoogland; Harrie Lavreysen; Roy van den Berg	41.643	+0.043	
Bronze medal race
3rd place, bronze medalist(s)	Great Britain; Jack Carlin; Alistair Fielding; Hamish Turnbull	42.844		
4	Germany; Stefan Bötticher; Maximilian Dörnbach; Nik Schröter	42.950	+0.106	
