= 2022 UCI Track Cycling World Championships – Men's sprint =

Men's sprint at the 2022 UCI Track Cycling World Championships
- Venue: Vélodrome National
- Location: Saint-Quentin-en-Yvelines, France
- Dates: 15–16 October
- Competitors: 35 from 21 nations

Medalists
gold medal	Harrie Lavreysen	Netherlands
silver medal	Matthew Richardson	Australia
bronze medal	Matthew Glaetzer	Australia

The Men's sprint competition at the 2022 UCI Track Cycling World Championships was held on 15 and 16 October 2022.

== Results ==
=== Qualifying ===
The qualifying was started on 15 October at 12:30. The top four riders advanced directly to the 1/8 finals; places 5 to 28 advanced to the 1/16 final.

Rank	Name	Nation	Time	Behind	Notes
1	Harrie Lavreysen	Netherlands	9.224		Q
2	Matthew Richardson	Australia	9.381	+0.157	Q
3	Matthew Glaetzer	Australia	9.405	+0.181	Q
4	Mateusz Rudyk	Poland	9.456	+0.232	Q
5	Thomas Cornish	Australia	9.527	+0.303	Q
6	Kaiya Ota	Japan	9.531	+0.307	Q
7	Tom Derache	France	9.543	+0.319	Q
8	Sébastien Vigier	France	9.548	+0.324	Q
9	Hamish Turnbull	Great Britain	9.592	+0.368	Q
10	Jack Carlin	Great Britain	9.601	+0.377	Q
11	Rayan Helal	France	9.605	+0.381	Q
12	Nick Wammes	Canada	9.622	+0.398	Q
13	Stefan Bötticher	Germany	9.623	+0.399	Q
14	Sándor Szalontay	Hungary	9.631	+0.407	Q
15	Cristian Ortega	Colombia	9.639	+0.415	Q
16	Kevin Quintero	Colombia	9.643	+0.419	Q
17	Kohei Terasaki	Japan	9.673	+0.449	Q
18	Sam Ligtlee	Netherlands	9.680	+0.456	Q
19	Martin Čechman	Czech Republic	9.681	+0.457	Q
20	Tijmen van Loon	Netherlands	9.688	+0.464	Q
21	Jair Tjon En Fa	Suriname	9.698	+0.474	Q
22	Kento Yamasaki	Japan	9.741	+0.517	Q
23	Maximilian Dörnbach	Germany	9.806	+0.582	Q
24	Ryan Dodyk	Canada	9.817	+0.593	Q
25	Liu Qi	China	9.827	+0.603	Q
26	Rafał Sarnecki	Poland	9.836	+0.612	Q
27	Muhammad Shah Firdaus Sahrom	Malaysia	9.840	+0.616	Q
28	Alejandro Martínez	Spain	9.847	+0.623	Q
29	Jai Angsuthasawit	Thailand	9.867	+0.643	
30	Svajūnas Jonauskas	Lithuania	9.905	+0.681	
31	Ronaldo Laitonjam	India	9.910	+0.686	
32	Andrey Chugay	Kazakhstan	9.911	+0.687	
33	Sergey Ponomaryov	Kazakhstan	9.941	+0.717	
34	Kwesi Browne	Trinidad and Tobago	10.012	+0.788	
35	Jean Spies	South Africa	10.044	+0.820	

=== 1/16 finals ===
The 1/16 finals were started on 15 October at 13:40.

Heat	Rank	Name	Nation	Gap	Notes
1	1	Thomas Cornish	Australia		Q
1	2	Alejandro Martínez	Spain	+0.186	
2	1	Kaiya Ota	Japan		Q
2	2	Muhammad Shah Firdaus Sahrom	Malaysia	+0.073	
3	1	Rafał Sarnecki	Poland		Q
3	2	Tom Derache	France		REL
4	1	Sébastien Vigier	France		Q
4	2	Liu Qi	China	+0.047	
5	1	Hamish Turnbull	Great Britain		Q
5	2	Ryan Dodyk	Canada	+0.159	
6	1	Jack Carlin	Great Britain		Q
6	2	Maximilian Dörnbach	Germany	+0.089	
7	1	Rayan Helal	France		Q
7	2	Kento Yamasaki	Japan	+0.024	
8	1	Jair Tjon En Fa	Suriname		Q
8	2	Nick Wammes	Canada	+0.133	
9	1	Stefan Bötticher	Germany		Q
9	2	Tijmen van Loon	Netherlands	+0.078	
10	1	Martin Čechman	Czech Republic		Q
10	2	Sándor Szalontay	Hungary	+0.100	
11	1	Cristian Ortega	Colombia		Q
11	2	Sam Ligtlee	Netherlands	+0.339	
12	1	Kevin Quintero	Colombia		Q
12	2	Kohei Terasaki	Japan	+0.036	

=== 1/8 finals ===
The 1/8 finals were started on 15 October at 15:21.

Heat	Rank	Name	Nation	Gap	Notes
1	1	Harrie Lavreysen	Netherlands		Q
1	2	Kevin Quintero	Colombia	+0.474	
2	1	Matthew Richardson	Australia		Q
2	2	Cristian Ortega	Colombia	+0.176	
3	1	Matthew Glaetzer	Australia		Q
3	2	Martin Čechman	Czech Republic	+0.094	
4	1	Mateusz Rudyk	Poland		Q
4	2	Stefan Bötticher	Germany	+0.054	
5	1	Jair Tjon En Fa	Suriname		Q
5	2	Thomas Cornish	Australia	+0.531	
6	1	Rayan Helal	France		Q
6	2	Kaiya Ota	Japan	+0.027	
7	1	Jack Carlin	Great Britain		Q
7	2	Rafał Sarnecki	Poland	+0.056	
8	1	Hamish Turnbull	Great Britain		Q
8	2	Sébastien Vigier	France	+0.001	

=== Quarterfinals ===
The quarterfinals were started on 15 October at 17:52.

Heat	Rank	Name	Nation	Race 1	Race 2	Decider (i.r.)	Notes
1	1	Harrie Lavreysen	Netherlands	X	X		Q
1	2	Hamish Turnbull	Great Britain	+0.094	+0.217		
2	1	Matthew Richardson	Australia	X	X		Q
2	2	Jack Carlin	Great Britain	+2.267	+0.031		
3	1	Matthew Glaetzer	Australia	X	X		Q
3	2	Rayan Helal	France	+0.573	+0.105		
4	1	Mateusz Rudyk	Poland	X	+0.015	X	Q
4	2	Jair Tjon En Fa	Suriname	+0.041	X	+0.080	

=== Semifinals ===
The semifinals were started on 16 October at 17:52.

Heat	Rank	Name	Nation	Race 1	Race 2	Decider (i.r.)	Notes
1	1	Harrie Lavreysen	Netherlands	X	X		Q
1	2	Mateusz Rudyk	Poland	+0.399	+0.146		
2	1	Matthew Richardson	Australia	X	X		Q
2	2	Matthew Glaetzer	Australia	+0.015	+0.038		

=== Finals ===
The finals were started on 16 October at 14:07.

Rank	Name	Nation	Race 1	Race 2	Decider (i.r.)
Gold medal race
1st place, gold medalist(s)	Harrie Lavreysen	Netherlands	X	X	
2nd place, silver medalist(s)	Matthew Richardson	Australia	+0.155	+0.083	
Bronze medal race
3rd place, bronze medalist(s)	Matthew Glaetzer	Australia	X	X	
4	Mateusz Rudyk	Poland	+0.223	+0.259	
