= 2021 UEC European Track Championships – Men's keirin =

Men's keirin at the 2021 UEC European Track Championships
- Venue: Tissot Velodrome, Grenchen
- Date: 9 October
- Competitors: 29 from 15 nations

Medalists
gold medal	Jeffrey Hoogland	Netherlands
silver medal	Tom Derache	France
bronze medal	Joachim Eilers	Germany

The Men's keirin competition at the 2021 UEC European Track Championships was held on 9 October 2021.

== Results ==
=== First round ===
The first rider in each heat qualified to the second round, all other riders advanced to the first round repechages.

Heat 1

Rank	Name	Nation	Notes
1	Harrie Lavreysen	Netherlands	Q
2	Joachim Eilers	Germany	
3	Tomáš Bábek	Czech Republic	
4	Ekain Jiménez	Spain	

Heat 2

Rank	Name	Nation	Notes
1	Jeffrey Hoogland	Netherlands	Q
2	Daniel Rochna	Poland	
3	Denis Dmitriev	Russia	
4	Marc Jurczyk	Germany	
5	Miroslav Minchev	Bulgaria	

Heat 3

Rank	Name	Nation	Notes
1	Hamish Turnbull	Great Britain	Q
2	Rayan Helal	France	
3	Uladzislau Novik	Belarus	
4	Bohdan Danylchuk	Ukraine	
5	Sotirios Bretas	Greece	

Heat 4

Rank	Name	Nation	Notes
1	Mikhail Iakovlev	Russia	Q
2	Martin Čechman	Czech Republic	
3	Aliaksandr Hlova	Belarus	
4	Sándor Szalontay	Hungary	
5	Vasilijus Lendel	Lithuania	

Heat 5

Rank	Name	Nation	Notes
1	Patryk Rajkowski	Poland	Q
2	Alejandro Martínez	Spain	
3	Patrik Rómeó Lovassy	Hungary	
4	Vladyslav Denysenko	Ukraine	
	Davide Boscaro	Italy	DNF

Heat 6

Rank	Name	Nation	Notes
1	Tom Derache	France	Q
2	Svajūnas Jonauskas	Lithuania	
3	Joseph Truman	Great Britain	
4	Matteo Bianchi	Italy	
5	Konstantinos Livanos	Greece	

=== First round repechage ===
The first rider in each heat qualify to the second round.

Heat 1

Rank	Name	Nation	Notes
1	Joachim Eilers	Germany	Q
2	Bohdan Danylchuk	Ukraine	
3	Joseph Truman	Great Britain	

Heat 2

Rank	Name	Nation	Notes
1	Daniel Rochna	Poland	Q
2	Konstantinos Livanos	Greece	
3	Ekain Jiménez	Spain	
4	Patrik Rómeó Lovassy	Hungary	

Heat 3

Rank	Name	Nation	Notes
1	Rayan Helal	France	Q
2	Vladyslav Denysenko	Ukraine	
3	Aliaksandr Hlova	Belarus	
4	Miroslav Minchev	Bulgaria	

Heat 4

Rank	Name	Nation	Notes
1	Martin Čechman	Czech Republic	Q
2	Uladzislau Novik	Belarus	
3	Matteo Bianchi	Italy	

Heat 5

Rank	Name	Nation	Notes
1	Marc Jurczyk	Germany	Q
2	Denis Dmitriev	Russia	
3	Alejandro Martínez	Spain	
4	Vasilijus Lendel	Lithuania	

Heat 6

Rank	Name	Nation	Notes
1	Tomáš Bábek	Czech Republic	Q
2	Sotirios Bretas	Greece	
3	Svajūnas Jonauskas	Lithuania	
4	Sándor Szalontay	Hungary	

=== Second round ===
The first three riders in each heat qualified to final 1–6, all other riders advanced to final 7–12.

Heat 1

Rank	Name	Nation	Notes
1	Harrie Lavreysen	Netherlands	Q
2	Patryk Rajkowski	Poland	Q
3	Mikhail Iakovlev	Russia	Q
4	Tomáš Bábek	Czech Republic	
5	Daniel Rochna	Poland	
6	Rayan Helal	France	

Heat 2

Rank	Name	Nation	Notes
1	Jeffrey Hoogland	Netherlands	Q
2	Tom Derache	France	Q
3	Joachim Eilers	Germany	Q
4	Marc Jurczyk	Germany	
5	Martin Čechman	Czech Republic	
6	Hamish Turnbull	Great Britain	

=== Finals ===
Small final

Rank	Name	Nation	Notes
7	Marc Jurczyk	Germany	
8	Daniel Rochna	Poland	
9	Hamish Turnbull	Great Britain	
10	Martin Čechman	Czech Republic	
11	Tomáš Bábek	Czech Republic	
12	Rayan Helal	France	

Final

Rank	Name	Nation	Notes
1st place, gold medalist(s)	Jeffrey Hoogland	Netherlands	
2nd place, silver medalist(s)	Tom Derache	France	
3rd place, bronze medalist(s)	Joachim Eilers	Germany	
4	Mikhail Iakovlev	Russia	
5	Patryk Rajkowski	Poland	
6	Harrie Lavreysen	Netherlands	
