= 2021 UEC European Track Championships – Men's team sprint =

Men's team sprint at the 2021 UEC European Track Championships
- Venue: Tissot Velodrome, Grenchen
- Date: 5 October
- Competitors: 32 from 9 nations
- Winning time: 42.302

Medalists
gold medal	Jeffrey Hoogland; Harrie Lavreysen; Roy van den Berg; Sam Ligtlee	Netherlands
silver medal	Timmy Gillion; Sébastien Vigier; Rayan Helal	France
bronze medal	Maciej Bielecki; Patryk Rajkowski; Mateusz Rudyk; Daniel Rochna	Poland

The men's team sprint competition at the 2021 UEC European Track Championships was held on 5 October 2021.

== Results ==
=== Qualifying ===
The eight fastest teams advanced to the first round.

Rank	Nation	Time	Behind	Notes
1	Netherlands; Roy van den Berg; Harrie Lavreysen; Sam Ligtlee	43.037		Q
2	France; Timmy Gillion; Sébastien Vigier; Rayan Helal	43.459	+0.422	Q
3	Russia; Ivan Gladyshev; Alexander Sharapov; Pavel Yakushevskiy	43.806	+0.769	Q
4	Poland; Maciej Bielecki; Patryk Rajkowski; Daniel Rochna	43.852	+0.815	Q
5	Germany; Nik Schröter; Marc Jurczyk; Anton Höhne	43.940	+0.903	Q
6	Great Britain; Alistair Fielding; Hamish Turnbull; James Bunting	44.090	+1.053	Q
7	Czech Republic; Matěj Bohuslávek; Martin Čechman; Robin Wagner	44.782	+1.745	Q
8	Greece; Ioannis Kalogeropoulos; Konstantinos Livanos; Sotirios Bretas	44.810	+1.773	Q
9	Ukraine; Mykhaylo-Yaroslav Dydko; Vladyslav Denysenko; Bohdan Danylchuk	46.438	+3.401	

=== First round ===
First round heats were held as follows:
Heat 1: 4th v 5th fastest
Heat 2: 3rd v 6th fastest
Heat 3: 2nd v 7th fastest
Heat 4: 1st v 8th fastest

The heat winners were ranked on time, from which the top 2 proceeded to the gold medal final and the other 2 proceeded to the bronze medal final.

Heat	Rank	Nation	Time	Notes
1	1	Poland; Maciej Bielecki; Daniel Rochna; Mateusz Rudyk	43.159	QB
1	2	Germany; Nik Schröter; Marc Jurczyk; Anton Höhne	43.891	
2	1	Great Britain; Alistair Fielding; Joseph Truman; Hamish Turnbull	43.164	QB
2	2	Russia; Denis Dmitriev; Ivan Gladyshev; Pavel Yakushevskiy	43.252	
3	1	France; Timmy Gillion; Sébastien Vigier; Rayan Helal	42.958	QG
3	2	Czech Republic; Tomáš Bábek; Matěj Bohuslávek; Martin Čechman	44.474	
4	1	Netherlands; Jeffrey Hoogland; Harrie Lavreysen; Roy van den Berg	42.116	QG
4	2	Greece; Sotirios Bretas; Ioannis Kalogeropoulos; Konstantinos Livanos	44.916	

=== Finals ===
Rank	Nation	Time	Behind	Notes
Gold medal final
1st place, gold medalist(s)	Netherlands; Jeffrey Hoogland; Harrie Lavreysen; Roy van den Berg	42.302		
2nd place, silver medalist(s)	France; Timmy Gillion; Rayan Helal; Sébastien Vigier	44.193	+1.891	
Bronze medal final
3rd place, bronze medalist(s)	Poland; Maciej Bielecki; Patryk Rajkowski; Mateusz Rudyk	43.007		
4	Great Britain; Alistair Fielding; Joseph Truman; Hamish Turnbull	43.044	+0.037	
