= 2024 UEC European Track Championships – Men's team sprint =

Men's team sprint at the 2024 UEC European Track Championships
- Venue: Omnisport Apeldoorn, Apeldoorn
- Date: 10 January
- Competitors: 35 from 11 nations
- Winning time: 41.958

Medalists
gold medal	Jeffrey Hoogland; Harrie Lavreysen; Roy van den Berg; Tijmen van Loon	Netherlands
silver medal	Florian Grengbo; Rayan Helal; Sébastien Vigier	France
bronze medal	Daniel Rochna; Mateusz Rudyk; Rafał Sarnecki; Maciej Bielecki	Poland

The men's team sprint competition at the 2024 UEC European Track Championships was held on 10 January 2024.

== Results ==
=== Qualifying ===
The eight fastest teams advanced to the first round.

Rank	Nation	Time	Behind	Notes
1	Netherlands; Roy van den Berg; Harrie Lavreysen; Tijmen van Loon	43.062		Q
2	France; Florian Grengbo; Rayan Helal; Sébastien Vigier	43.066	+0.004	Q
3	Great Britain; Jack Carlin; Alistair Fielding; Hamish Turnbull	43.240	+0.178	Q
4	Poland; Rafał Sarnecki; Maciej Bielecki; Mateusz Rudyk	43.500	+0.438	Q
5	Germany; Maximilian Dörnbach; Nik Schröter; Luca Spiegel	43.544	+0.482	Q
6	Czech Republic; Matěj Bohuslávek; Dominik Topinka; Martin Čechman	43.568	+0.506	Q
7	Italy; Daniele Napolitano; Mattia Predomo; Matteo Bianchi	43.733	+0.671	Q
8	Spain; José Moreno; Alejandro Martínez; Ekain Jiménez	44.261	+1.199	Q
9	Ukraine; Bohdan Danylchuk; Vladyslav Denysenko; Valentyn Varharakyn	45.454	+2.392	
10	Belgium; Mathijs Verhoeven; Runar De Schrijver; Tjorven Mertens	45.540	+2.478	
11	Greece; Ioannis Kalogeropoulos; Miltiadis Charovas; Konstantinos Livanos	45.688	+2.626	

=== First round ===
First round heats were held as follows:
Heat 1: 4th v 5th fastest
Heat 2: 3rd v 6th fastest
Heat 3: 2nd v 7th fastest
Heat 4: 1st v 8th fastest

The heat winners were ranked on time, from which the top 2 proceeded to the gold medal final and the other 2 proceeded to the bronze medal final.

Heat	Rank	Nation	Time	Behind	Notes
1	1	Poland; Daniel Rochna; Mateusz Rudyk; Rafał Sarnecki	43.290		QB
1	2	Germany; Maximilian Dörnbach; Nik Schröter; Luca Spiegel	43.472	+0.182	
2	1	Great Britain; Jack Carlin; Alistair Fielding; Hamish Turnbull	43.159		QB
2	2	Czech Republic; Matěj Bohuslávek; Dominik Topinka; Martin Čechman	43.541	+0.382	
3	1	France; Florian Grengbo; Rayan Helal; Sébastien Vigier	42.712		QG
3	2	Italy; Matteo Bianchi; Daniele Napolitano; Mattia Predomo	43.497	+0.785	
4	1	Netherlands; Harrie Lavreysen; Roy van den Berg; Jeffrey Hoogland	42.378		QG
4	2	Spain; Ekain Jiménez; Alejandro Martínez; José Moreno	44.188	+1.810	

=== Finals ===
Rank	Nation	Time	Behind	Notes
Gold medal final
1st place, gold medalist(s)	Netherlands; Jeffrey Hoogland; Harrie Lavreysen; Roy van den Berg	41.958		
2nd place, silver medalist(s)	France; Florian Grengbo; Rayan Helal; Sébastien Vigier	42.718	+0.760	
Bronze medal final
3rd place, bronze medalist(s)	Poland; Daniel Rochna; Mateusz Rudyk; Rafał Sarnecki	43.177		
4	Great Britain; Jack Carlin; Alistair Fielding; Hamish Turnbull	43.205	+0.028	
