= 2022 UEC European Track Championships – Men's sprint =

Men's team sprint at the 2022 UEC European Track Championships
- Venue: Messe München, Munich
- Date: 13–14 August
- Competitors: 22 from 12 nations

Medalists
gold medal	Sébastien Vigier	France
silver medal	Jack Carlin	Great Britain
bronze medal	Rayan Helal	France

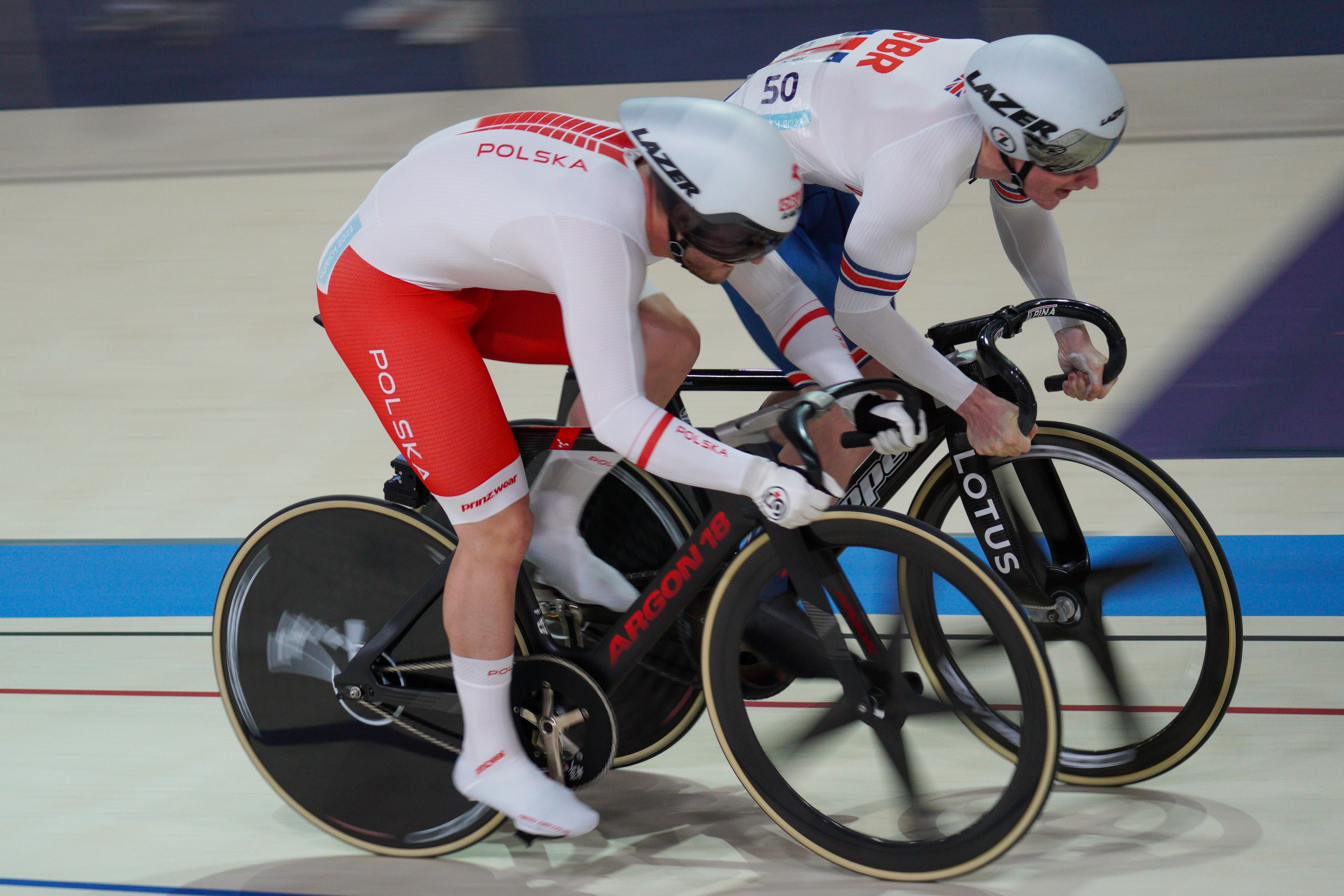
UEC Track Elite European Championships

The men's sprint competition at the 2022 UEC European Track Championships was held on 13 and 14 August 2022.

== Results ==
=== Qualifying ===
The top 10 riders qualified for the 1/8 finals, 11th to 22nd places qualified for the 1/16 finals.

Rank	Name	Nation	Time	Notes
1	Jack Carlin	Great Britain	9.604	Q
2	Mateusz Rudyk	Poland	9.631	Q
3	Sébastien Vigier	France	9.641	Q
4	Rayan Helal	France	9.675	Q
5	Tijmen van Loon	Netherlands	9.695	Q
6	Maximilian Dörnbach	Germany	9.785	Q
7	Marc Jurczyk	Germany	9.839	Q
8	Sándor Szalontay	Hungary	9.870	Q
9	Vasilijus Lendel	Lithuania	9.870	Q
10	Hamish Turnbull	Great Britain	9.876	Q
11	Martin Čechman	Czech Republic	9.877	q
12	Rafał Sarnecki	Poland	9.933	q
13	Matěj Bohuslávek	Czech Republic	9.995	q
14	Alejandro Martínez	Spain	10.034	q
15	Svajūnas Jonauskas	Lithuania	10.035	q
16	Matteo Bianchi	Italy	10.171	q
17	José Moreno	Spain	10.240	q
18	Vladyslav Denysenko	Ukraine	10.317	q
19	Bálint Csengői	Hungary	10.320	q
20	Daniele Napolitano	Italy	10.563	q
21	Mykhaylo-Yaroslav Dydko	Ukraine	10.649	q
22	Eduard Žalar	Slovenia	11.352	q

=== 1/16 finals ===
Heat winners advanced to the 1/8 finals.

Heat	Rank	Name	Nation	Time	Notes
1	1	Martin Čechman	Czech Republic	X	Q
1	2	Eduard Žalar	Slovenia		
2	1	Rafał Sarnecki	Poland	X	Q
2	2	Mykhaylo-Yaroslav Dydko	Ukraine		
3	1	Matěj Bohuslávek	Czech Republic	X	Q
3	2	Daniele Napolitano	Italy		
4	1	Alejandro Martínez	Spain	X	Q
4	2	Bálint Csengői	Hungary		
5	1	Svajūnas Jonauskas	Lithuania	X	Q
5	2	Vladyslav Denysenko	Ukraine		
6	1	Matteo Bianchi	Italy	X	Q
6	2	José Moreno	Spain		

=== 1/8 finals ===
Heat winners advanced to the quarterfinals.

Heat	Rank	Name	Nation	Time	Notes
1	1	Jack Carlin	Great Britain	X	Q
1	2	Matteo Bianchi	Italy		
2	1	Mateusz Rudyk	Poland	X	Q
2	2	Svajūnas Jonauskas	Lithuania		
3	1	Sébastien Vigier	France	X	Q
3	2	Alejandro Martínez	Spain		
4	1	Rayan Helal	France	X	Q
4	2	Matěj Bohuslávek	Czech Republic		
5	1	Tijmen van Loon	Netherlands	X	Q
5	2	Rafał Sarnecki	Poland		
6	1	Maximilian Dörnbach	Germany	X	Q
6	2	Martin Čechman	Czech Republic		
7	1	Hamish Turnbull	Great Britain	X	Q
7	2	Marc Jurczyk	Germany		
8	1	Sándor Szalontay	Hungary	X	Q
8	2	Vasilijus Lendel	Lithuania		

=== Quarterfinals ===
Matches are extended to a best-of-three format hereon; winners proceed to the semifinals.

Heat	Rank	Name	Nation	Race 1	Race 2	Decider (i.r.)	Notes
1	1	Jack Carlin	Great Britain	X	X		Q
1	2	Sándor Szalontay	Hungary				
2	1	Hamish Turnbull	Great Britain	X	X		Q
2	2	Mateusz Rudyk	Poland				
3	1	Sébastien Vigier	France		X	X	Q
3	2	Maximilian Dörnbach	Germany	X			
4	1	Rayan Helal	France	X	X		Q
4	2	Tijmen van Loon	Netherlands				

=== Semifinals ===
Winners proceed to the gold medal final; losers proceed to the bronze medal final.

Heat	Rank	Name	Nation	Race 1	Race 2	Decider (i.r.)	Notes
1	1	Jack Carlin	Great Britain	X	X		QG
1	2	Rayan Helal	France				QB
2	1	Sébastien Vigier	France		X	X	QG
2	2	Hamish Turnbull	Great Britain	X			QB

=== Finals ===
Rank	Name	Nation	Race 1	Race 2	Decider (i.r.)
Gold medal final
1st place, gold medalist(s)	Sebastien Vigier	France		X	X
2nd place, silver medalist(s)	Jack Carlin	Great Britain	X		
Bronze medal final
3rd place, bronze medalist(s)	Rayan Helal	France	X	X	
4	Hamish Turnbull	Great Britain			
