= 2023 UEC European Track Championships – Men's sprint =

Men's sprint at the 2023 UEC European Track Championships
- Venue: Tissot Velodrome, Grenchen
- Dates: 10–11 February
- Competitors: 27 from 12 nations

Medalists
gold medal	Harrie Lavreysen	Netherlands
silver medal	Mateusz Rudyk	Poland
bronze medal	Rayan Helal	France

The men's sprint competition at the 2023 UEC European Track Championships was held on 10 and 11 February 2023.

== Results ==
=== Qualifying ===
The top 5 riders qualified for the 1/8 finals, 6th to 27th places qualified for the 1/16 finals.

Rank	Name	Nation	Time	Behind	Notes
1	Harrie Lavreysen	Netherlands	9.392		Q
2	Mikhail Yakovlev	Israel	9.520	+0.128	Q
3	Mateusz Rudyk	Poland	9.562	+0.170	Q
4	Sébastien Vigier	France	9.586	+0.194	Q
5	Rayan Helal	France	9.612	+0.220	Q
6	Jack Carlin	Great Britain	9.685	+0.293	q
7	Maximilian Dörnbach	Germany	9.707	+0.315	q
8	Jeffrey Hoogland	Netherlands	9.728	+0.336	q
9	Vasilijus Lendel	Lithuania	9.731	+0.339	q
10	Sándor Szalontay	Hungary	9.754	+0.362	q
11	Hamish Turnbull	Great Britain	9.792	+0.400	q
12	Rafał Sarnecki	Poland	9.796	+0.404	q
13	Marc Jurczyk	Germany	9.816	+0.424	q
14	Martin Čechman	Czech Republic	9.875	+0.483	q
15	Alejandro Martínez	Spain	9.888	+0.496	q
16	Dominik Topinka	Czech Republic	10.008	+0.616	q
17	Conor Rowley	Ireland	10.091	+0.699	q
18	Mattia Predomo	Italy	10.098	+0.706	q
19	Ekain Jiménez	Spain	10.103	+0.711	q
20	Justas Beniušis	Lithuania	10.118	+0.726	q
21	Stefano Moro	Italy	10.205	+0.813	q
22	Bohdan Danylchuk	Ukraine	10.207	+0.815	q
23	Vladyslav Denysenko	Ukraine	10.213	+0.821	q
24	Norbert Szabó	Hungary	10.266	+0.874	q
25	Ioannis Kalogeropoulos	Greece	10.491	+1.099	q
26	Stamatios Savvakis	Greece	10.520	+1.128	q
27	Eduard Žalar	Slovenia	10.812	+1.420	q

=== 1/16 finals ===
Heat winners advanced to the 1/8 finals.

Heat	Rank	Name	Nation	Time	Notes
1	1	Jack Carlin	Great Britain	X	Q
1	2	Eduard Žalar	Slovenia	+0.424	
2	1	Maximilian Dörnbach	Germany	X	Q
2	2	Stamatios Savvakis	Greece	+0.579	
3	1	Jeffrey Hoogland	Netherlands	X	Q
3	2	Ioannis Kalogeropoulos	Greece	+0.334	
4	1	Vasilijus Lendel	Lithuania	X	Q
4	2	Norbert Szabó	Hungary	+0.155	
5	1	Sándor Szalontay	Hungary	X	Q
5	2	Vladyslav Denysenko	Ukraine	+0.416	
6	1	Hamish Turnbull	Great Britain	X	Q
6	2	Bohdan Danylchuk	Ukraine	+0.021	
7	1	Rafał Sarnecki	Poland	X	Q
7	2	Stefano Moro	Italy	+0.201	
8	1	Marc Jurczyk	Germany	X	Q
8	2	Justas Beniušis	Lithuania	+0.079	
9	1	Martin Čechman	Czech Republic	X	Q
9	2	Ekain Jiménez	Spain	+0.330	
10	1	Mattia Predomo	Italy	X	Q
10	2	Alejandro Martínez	Spain	+0.153	
11	1	Dominik Topinka	Czech Republic	X	Q
11	2	Conor Rowley	Ireland	+0.013	

=== 1/8 finals ===
Heat winners advanced to the quarterfinals.

Heat	Rank	Name	Nation	Time	Notes
1	1	Harrie Lavreysen	Netherlands	X	Q
1	2	Dominik Topinka	Czech Republic	+0.150	
2	1	Mikhail Yakovlev	Israel	X	Q
2	2	Mattia Predomo	Italy	+0.049	
3	1	Mateusz Rudyk	Poland	X	Q
3	2	Martin Čechman	Czech Republic	+0.273	
4	1	Sébastien Vigier	France	X	Q
4	2	Marc Jurczyk	Germany	+0.103	
5	1	Rayan Helal	France	X	Q
5	2	Rafał Sarnecki	Poland	+0.222	
6	1	Jack Carlin	Great Britain	X	Q
6	2	Hamish Turnbull	Great Britain	+0.089	
7	1	Maximilian Dörnbach	Germany	X	Q
7	2	Sándor Szalontay	Hungary	+0.089	
8	1	Jeffrey Hoogland	Netherlands	X	Q
8	2	Vasilijus Lendel	Lithuania	+0.092	

=== Quarterfinals ===
Matches are extended to a best-of-three format hereon; winners proceed to the semifinals.

Heat	Rank	Name	Nation	Race 1	Race 2	Decider (i.r.)	Notes
1	1	Harrie Lavreysen	Netherlands	X	X		Q
1	2	Jeffrey Hoogland	Netherlands	+0.193	+0.224		
2	1	Mikhail Yakovlev	Israel	X	X		Q
2	2	Maximilian Dörnbach	Germany	+0.616	+2.086		
3	1	Mateusz Rudyk	Poland	X	X		Q
3	2	Jack Carlin	Great Britain	+0.000	+0.071		
4	1	Rayan Helal	France	X	X		Q
4	2	Sébastien Vigier	France	+0.090	+0.260		

=== Semifinals ===
Winners proceed to the gold medal final; losers proceed to the bronze medal final.

Heat	Rank	Name	Nation	Race 1	Race 2	Decider (i.r.)	Notes
1	1	Harrie Lavreysen	Netherlands	X	X		QG
1	2	Rayan Helal	France	+0.077	+0.064		QB
2	1	Mateusz Rudyk	Poland	X	X		QG
2	2	Mikhail Yakovlev	Israel	+0.040	+0.459		QB

=== Finals ===
Rank	Name	Nation	Race 1	Race 2	Decider (i.r.)
Gold medal final
1st place, gold medalist(s)	Harrie Lavreysen	Netherlands	X	X	
2nd place, silver medalist(s)	Mateusz Rudyk	Poland	+0.083	+0.146	
Bronze medal final
3rd place, bronze medalist(s)	Rayan Helal	France	X	X	
4	Mikhail Yakovlev	Israel	+0.079	+0.022	
