= 2022 UEC European Track Championships – Men's team sprint =

Men's team sprint at the 2022 UEC European Track Championships
- Venue: Messe München, Munich
- Date: 11–12 August
- Competitors: 31 from 10 nations
- Winning time: 34.639

Medalists
| gold medal | Jeffrey Hoogland; Harrie Lavreysen; Roy van den Berg; Sam Ligtlee | Netherlands |
| silver medal | Timmy Gillion; Rayan Helal; Sébastien Vigier; Melvin Landerneau | France |
| bronze medal | Jack Carlin; Alistair Fielding; Hamish Turnbull | Great Britain |

The men's team sprint competition at the 2022 UEC European Track Championships was held on 11 and 12 August 2022.

== Results ==
=== Qualifying ===
The eight fastest teams advanced to the first round.

| Rank | Nation | Time | Behind | Notes |
|---|---|---|---|---|
| 1 | Netherlands; Jeffrey Hoogland; Harrie Lavreysen; Roy van den Berg | 35.036 | | Q |
| 2 | Great Britain; Jack Carlin; Alistair Fielding; Hamish Turnbull | 35.638 | +0.602 | Q |
| 3 | France; Timmy Gillion; Melvin Landerneau; Sébastien Vigier | 35.751 | +0.715 | Q |
| 4 | Poland; Patryk Rajkowski; Mateusz Rudyk; Rafał Sarnecki | 35.903 | +0.858 | Q |
| 5 | Germany; Maximilian Dörnbach; Marc Jurczyk; Nik Schröter | 36.096 | +1.059 | Q |
| 6 | Czech Republic; Tomáš Bábek; Matěj Bohuslávek; Martin Čechman | 36.256 | +1.220 | Q |
| 7 | Spain; Ekain Jiménez; Alejandro Martínez; José Moreno | 36.661 | +1.625 | Q |
| 8 | Italy; Matteo Bianchi; Daniele Napolitano; Matteo Tugnolo | 36.813 | +1.777 | Q |
| 9 | Lithuania; Svajūnas Jonauskas; Vasilijus Lendel; Laurynas Vinskas | 36.928 | +1.892 | |
| 10 | Ukraine; Dzhabar Abdul; Vladyslav Denysenko; Mykhaylo-Yaroslav Dydko | 37.946 | +2.910 | |

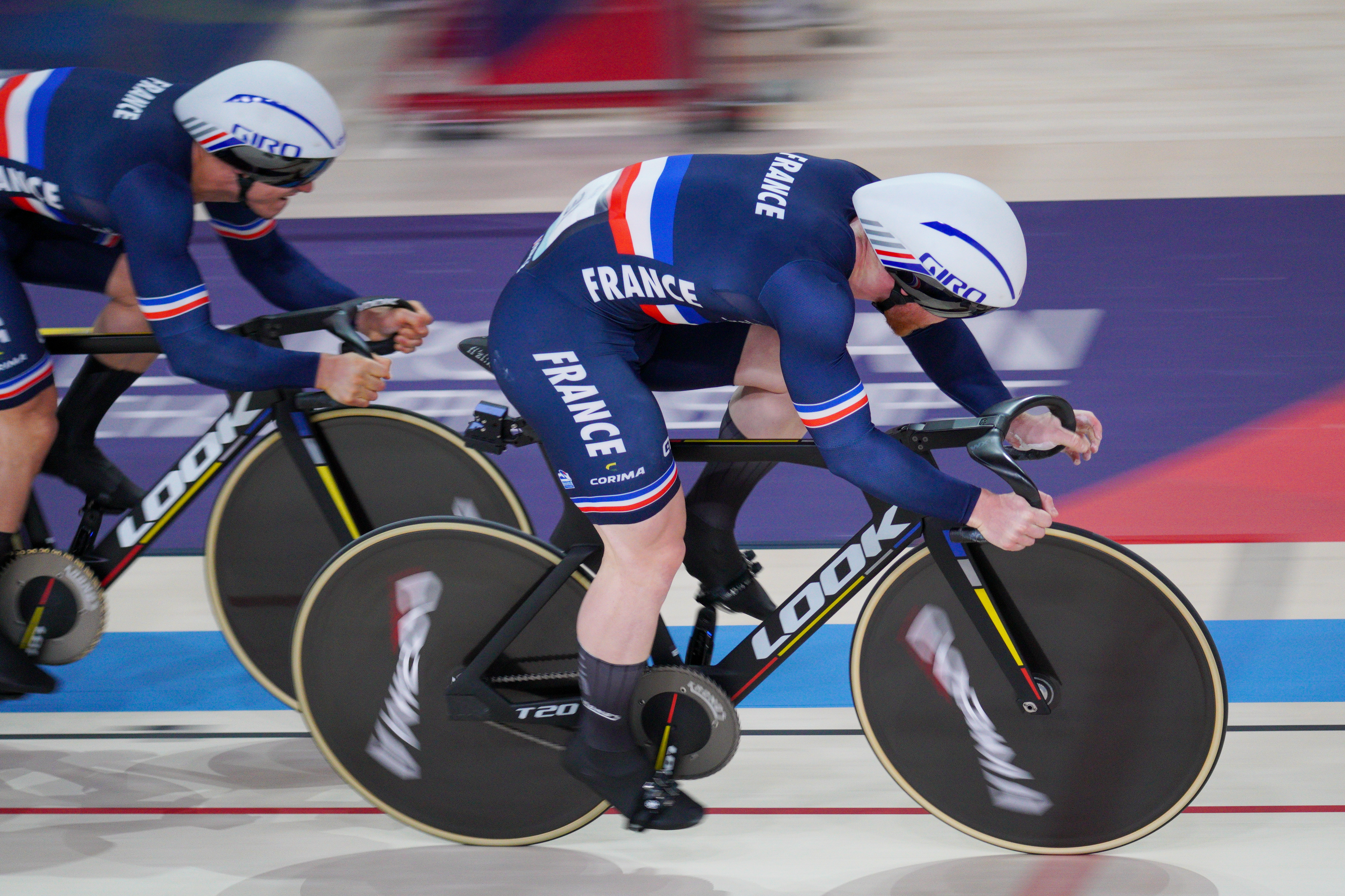
UEC Track Elite European Championships

=== First round ===
First round heats were held as follows:
Heat 1: 4th v 5th fastest
Heat 2: 3rd v 6th fastest
Heat 3: 2nd v 7th fastest
Heat 4: 1st v 8th fastest

The heat winners were ranked on time, from which the top 2 proceeded to the gold medal final and the other 2 proceeded to the bronze medal final.

| Heat | Rank | Nation | Time | Notes |
|---|---|---|---|---|
| 1 | 1 | Poland; Patryk Rajkowski; Mateusz Rudyk; Rafał Sarnecki | 35.664 | QB |
| 1 | 2 | Germany; Maximilian Dörnbach; Marc Jurczyk; Nik Schröter | 35.915 | |
| 2 | 1 | France; Timmy Gillion; Rayan Helal; Sébastien Vigier | 35.194 | QG |
| 2 | 2 | Czech Republic; Tomáš Bábek; Matěj Bohuslávek; Martin Čechman | 35.991 | |
| 3 | 1 | Great Britain; Jack Carlin; Alistair Fielding; Hamish Turnbull | 35.196 | QB |
| 3 | 2 | Spain; Ekain Jiménez; Alejandro Martínez; José Moreno | 36.765 | |
| 4 | 1 | Netherlands; Jeffrey Hoogland; Harrie Lavreysen; Roy van den Berg | 34.810 | QG |
| 4 | 2 | Italy; Matteo Bianchi; Daniele Napolitano; Matteo Tugnolo | 36.559 | |

=== Finals ===
| Rank | Nation | Time | Behind | Notes |
|---|---|---|---|---|
Gold medal final
| 1st place, gold medalist(s) | Netherlands; Jeffrey Hoogland; Harrie Lavreysen; Roy van den Berg | 34.639 | | |
| 2nd place, silver medalist(s) | France; Timmy Gillion; Rayan Helal; Sébastien Vigier | 35.516 | +0.877 | |
Bronze medal final
| 3rd place, bronze medalist(s) | Great Britain; Jack Carlin; Alistair Fielding; Hamish Turnbull | 35.173 | | |
| 4 | Poland; Patryk Rajkowski; Mateusz Rudyk; Rafał Sarnecki | 35.850 | +0.677 | |
