= 2023 UEC European Track Championships – Men's team sprint =

Men's team sprint at the 2023 UEC European Track Championships
- Venue: Tissot Velodrome, Grenchen
- Date: 8 February
- Competitors: 39 from 12 nations
- Winning time: 42.325

Medalists
gold medal	Jeffrey Hoogland; Harrie Lavreysen; Roy van den Berg; Tijmen van Loon	Netherlands
silver medal	Jack Carlin; Alistair Fielding; Hamish Turnbull; Joseph Truman	Great Britain
bronze medal	Timmy Gillion; Melvin Landerneau; Sébastien Vigier	France

The men's team sprint competition at the 2023 UEC European Track Championships was held on 8 February 2023.

== Results ==
=== Qualifying ===
The eight fastest teams advanced to the first round.

Rank	Nation	Time	Behind	Notes
1	Netherlands; Harrie Lavreysen; Tijmen van Loon; Roy van den Berg	42.826		Q
2	Great Britain; Alistair Fielding; Jack Carlin; Joseph Truman	43.145	+0.319	Q
3	France; Timmy Gillion; Sébastien Vigier; Melvin Landerneau	43.335	+0.509	Q
4	Poland; Maciej Bielecki; Mateusz Rudyk; Patryk Rajkowski	43.879	+1.053	Q
5	Germany; Luca Spiegel; Maximilian Dörnbach; Marc Jurczyk	44.023	+1.197	Q
6	Italy; Matteo Tugnolo; Matteo Bianchi; Mattia Predomo	44.256	+1.430	Q
7	Spain; José Moreno; Alejandro Martínez; Ekain Jiménez	44.590	+1.764	Q
8	Czech Republic; Jakub Šťastný; Dominik Topinka; Robin Wagner	45.150	+2.324	Q
9	Hungary; Bálint Csengői; Norbert Szabó; Sándor Szalontay	45.553	+2.727	
10	Lithuania; Laurynas Vinskas; Justas Beniušis; Vasilijus Lendel	45.605	+2.779	
11	Greece; Ioannis Kalogeropoulos; Miltiadis Charovas; Sotirios Bretas	45.687	+2.861	
12	Ukraine; Mykhaylo-Yaroslav Dydko; Bohdan Danylchuk; Vladyslav Denysenko	45.935	+3.109	

=== First round ===
First round heats were held as follows:
Heat 1: 4th v 5th fastest
Heat 2: 3rd v 6th fastest
Heat 3: 2nd v 7th fastest
Heat 4: 1st v 8th fastest

The heat winners were ranked on time, from which the top 2 proceeded to the gold medal final and the other 2 proceeded to the bronze medal final.

Heat	Rank	Nation	Time	Behind	Notes
1	1	Germany; Maximilian Dörnbach; Marc Jurczyk; Luca Spiegel	43.870		QB
1	2	Poland; Maciej Bielecki; Patryk Rajkowski; Mateusz Rudyk	43.970	+0.100	
2	1	France; Timmy Gillion; Melvin Landerneau; Sébastien Vigier	43.164		QB
2	2	Italy; Matteo Bianchi; Mattia Predomo; Matteo Tugnolo	44.071	+0.907	
3	1	Great Britain; Alistair Fielding; Joseph Truman; Hamish Turnbull	42.997		QG
3	2	Spain; Ekain Jiménez; Alejandro Martínez; José Moreno	44.320	+1.323	
4	1	Netherlands; Jeffrey Hoogland; Harrie Lavreysen; Roy van den Berg	42.272		QG
4	2	Czech Republic; Martin Čechman; Jakub Šťastný; Dominik Topinka	44.071	+1.799	

=== Finals ===
Rank	Nation	Time	Behind	Notes
Gold medal final
1st place, gold medalist(s)	Netherlands; Jeffrey Hoogland; Harrie Lavreysen; Roy van den Berg	42.325		
2nd place, silver medalist(s)	Great Britain; Jack Carlin; Alistair Fielding; Hamish Turnbull	43.565	+1.240	
Bronze medal final
3rd place, bronze medalist(s)	France; Timmy Gillion; Melvin Landerneau; Sébastien Vigier	43.332		
4	Germany; Maximilian Dörnbach; Marc Jurczyk; Luca Spiegel	44.501	+1.169	
