= 2021 UEC European Track Championships =

Track cycling event

- Venue: Grenchen, Switzerland
- Date: 5–9 October
- Velodrome: Tissot Velodrome
- Events: 22 (11 women, 11 men)

2021 UEC European Track Championships was the twelfth edition of the elite UEC European Track Championships in track cycling and took place at the Tissot Velodrome in Grenchen, Switzerland, from 5 to 9 October 2021. Originally it was supposed to be held in Minsk, Belarus, between 23 and 27 June 2021 as an elite UEC European Track Championships in track cycling On 27 May 2021 the Management Board of the European Cycling Union decided to cancel the 2021 Elite Track European Championships scheduled in Minsk in June 2021.

On 1 June, it was announced that the championships would go ahead in the second week of October 2021.

== Belarus hosting controversy ==
In March 2021 the Belarusian Sport Solidarity Foundation urged the European Cycling Union to relocate the event from Belarus on human rights grounds. The ECU replied that it was unable to find another suitable host. Earlier in the year, similar controversy regarding the proposed location of the 2021 IIHF World Championship in Belarus lead to it being moved from the country.

In May 2021 the National Olympic Committee and Sports Confederation of Denmark proposed to move the European Track Cycling Championship to Denmark due to safety issues and attitude towards COVID-19 in Belarus. Denmark is ready to consider the possibility of compensation for all losses of the European Cycling Union associated with the change of the venue.

On 25 May 2021 the German Cycling Federation informed the European Cycling Association that after the events with the forced grounding of Ryanair Flight 4978, it was not possible for the German team to come to Minsk under these circumstances. On 25 May the national track team of Netherlands also refused to go to Minsk. On 26 May the national track team of Lithuania announced about withdrawal from championships if it's going to be held in Minsk and proposed to move championships to Panevėžys in Lithuania.

== Schedule ==
Competition	F	Final

Men
Date →	Tue 5		Wed 6		Thu 7		Fri 8		Sat 9	
Event ↓	A	E	A	E	A	E	A	E	A	E
Sprint					Q,^{1}/_{16},^{1}/_{8}	QF		SF, F		
Team sprint	Q	R1, F								
Team pursuit	Q		R1	F						
Keirin									R1, R	R2, F
Omnium							SR, TR	ER, PR		
Madison										F
1 km time trial			Q	F						
Pursuit					Q	F				
Points race			Q	F						
Scratch					Q	F				
Elimination race		F								

Women
Date →	Tue 5		Wed 6		Thu 7		Fri 8		Sat 9	
Event ↓	A	E	A	E	A	E	A	E	A	E
Sprint			Q,^{1}/_{8}	QF		SF, F				
Team sprint	Q	R1, F								
Team pursuit	Q		R1	F						
Keirin									R1, R	R2, F
Omnium					SR, TR	ER, PR				
Madison										F
500 m time trial							Q	F		
Pursuit							Q	F		
Points race								F		
Scratch		F								
Elimination race				F						

A = Afternoon session, E = Evening session
Q = qualifiers, R1 = first round, R2 = second round, R = repechages, ^{1}/_{16} = sixteenth finals, ^{1}/_{8} = eighth finals, QF = quarterfinals, SF = semifinals,
SR = Scratch Race, TR = Tempo Race, ER = Elimination Race, PR = Points Race

== Events ==
Event	Gold		Silver		Bronze	
Men's events
Sprint	Harrie Lavreysen; Netherlands		Jeffrey Hoogland; Netherlands		Mikhail Iakovlev; Russia	
Team sprint	Netherlands; Jeffrey Hoogland; Harrie Lavreysen; Roy van den Berg; Sam Ligtlee	42.302	France; Timmy Gillion; Rayan Helal; Sébastien Vigier	44.193	Poland; Maciej Bielecki; Patryk Rajkowski; Mateusz Rudyk; Daniel Rochna	43.007
Team pursuit	Denmark; Carl-Frederik Bévort; Tobias Hansen; Matias Malmberg; Rasmus Pedersen	3:51.382	Switzerland; Claudio Imhof; Valère Thiébaud; Simon Vitzthum; Alex Vogel	3:52.646	Great Britain; Rhys Britton; Charlie Tanfield; William Tidball; Oliver Wood	3:55.595
Keirin	Jeffrey Hoogland; Netherlands		Tom Derache; France		Joachim Eilers; Germany	
Omnium	Alan Banaszek; Poland	136 pts	Fabio Van den Bossche; Belgium	130 pts	Matias Malmberg; Denmark	124 pts
Madison	Netherlands; Yoeri Havik; Jan-Willem van Schip	60 pts	Belgium; Kenny De Ketele; Lindsay De Vylder	56 pts	Portugal; Iúri Leitão; Rui Oliveira	49 pts
1 km time trial^{[N]}	Jeffrey Hoogland; Netherlands	58.016	Sam Ligtlee; Netherlands	59.767	Patryk Rajkowski; Poland	59.890
Individual pursuit^{[N]}	Jonathan Milan; Italy		Lev Gonov; Russia		Claudio Imhof; Switzerland	4:08.851
Points race^{[O]}	Benjamin Thomas; France	81 pts	Iúri Leitão; Portugal	61 pts	Vlas Shichkin; Russia	57 pts
Scratch^{[O]}	Rui Oliveira; Portugal		Vincent Hoppezak; Netherlands		JB Murphy; Ireland	
Elimination race^{[O]}	Sergey Rostovtsev; Russia		João Matias; Portugal		Thomas Boudat; France	
Women's events
Sprint	Shanne Braspennincx; Netherlands		Lea Friedrich; Germany		Mathilde Gros; France	
Team sprint	Netherlands; Shanne Braspennincx; Kyra Lamberink; Hetty van de Wouw; Steffie van der Peet	46.551; WR	Germany; Lea Friedrich; Pauline Grabosch; Alessa-Catriona Pröpster	47.299	Russia; Natalia Antonova; Daria Shmeleva; Yana Tyshchenko; Anastasia Voynova	46.795
Team pursuit	Germany; Franziska Brauße; Lisa Brennauer; Mieke Kröger; Laura Süßemilch; Lena Charlotte Reißner	4:13.489	Italy; Martina Alzini; Rachele Barbieri; Martina Fidanza; Silvia Zanardi; Letizia Paternoster	4:20.923	Ireland; Mia Griffin; Emily Kay; Kelly Murphy; Alice Sharpe	4:21.264
Keirin	Lea Friedrich; Germany		Olena Starikova; Ukraine		Yana Tyshchenko; Russia	
Omnium	Katie Archibald; Great Britain	154 pts	Victoire Berteau; France	120 pts	Rachele Barbieri; Italy	118 pts
Madison	Great Britain; Katie Archibald; Neah Evans	63 pts	Denmark; Amalie Dideriksen; Julie Leth	50 pts	France; Victoire Berteau; Marion Borras	49 pts
500 m time trial^{[N]}	Daria Shmeleva; Russia	33.086	Pauline Grabosch; Germany	33.336	Yana Tyshchenko; Russia	33.534
Individual pursuit^{[N]}	Lisa Brennauer; Germany	3:19.548	Marion Borras; France	3:23.297	Mieke Kröger; Germany	3:21.646
Points race^{[O]}	Gulnaz Khatuntseva; Russia	35 pts	Shari Bossuyt; Belgium	28 pts	Lonneke Uneken; Netherlands	22 pts
Scratch^{[O]}	Katie Archibald; Great Britain		Valentine Fortin; France		Daria Pikulik; Poland	
Elimination race^{[O]}	Valentine Fortin; France		Letizia Paternoster; Italy		Neah Evans; Great Britain	

- Competitors named in italics only participated in rounds prior to the final.
- ^{^{N}} These events are not contested in the Olympics.
- ^{^{O}} In the Olympics, these events are contested within the omnium only.

== Medal table ==
* Host nation (Switzerland)

Rank	Nation	Gold	Silver	Bronze	Total
1	Netherlands	7	3	1	11
2	Germany	3	3	2	8
3	Russia	3	1	5	9
4	Great Britain	3	0	2	5
5	France	2	5	3	10
6	Italy	1	2	1	4
6	Portugal	1	2	1	4
8	Denmark	1	1	1	3
9	Poland	1	0	3	4
10	Belgium	0	3	0	3
11	Switzerland*	0	1	1	2
12	Ukraine	0	1	0	1
13	Ireland	0	0	2	2
Totals (13 entries)		22	22	22	66
