= 2024 UEC European Track Championships =

Cycling championships

- Venue: Apeldoorn, Netherlands
- Date: 10–14 January
- Velodrome: Omnisport Apeldoorn
- Nations participating: 24
- Events: 22 (11 women, 11 men)

The 2024 UEC European Track Championships were the fifteenth edition of the elite UEC European Track Championships in track cycling and took place at the Omnisport Apeldoorn in Apeldoorn, Netherlands, from 10 to 14 January 2024.

== Schedule ==
Competition	F	Final

Men
Date →	Wed 10		Thu 11		Fri 12		Sat 13		Sun 14	
Event ↓	A	E	A	E	A	E	A	E	A	E
Sprint					Q, ^{1}/_{16}, ^{1}/_{8}	QF		SF, F		
Team sprint	Q	R1, F								
Team pursuit	Q	R1		F						
Keirin									R1, R, R2, F	
Omnium							SR	TR, ER, PR		
Madison				F						
1 km time trial			Q	F						
Pursuit					Q	F				
Points race									Q, F	
Scratch						F				
Elimination race		F								

Women
Date →	Wed 10		Thu 11		Fri 12		Sat 13		Sun 14	
Event ↓	A	E	A	E	A	E	A	E	A	E
Sprint			Q, ^{1}/_{16}, ^{1}/_{8}	QF		SF, F				
Team sprint	Q	R1, F								
Team pursuit	Q	R1		F						
Keirin									R1, R, R2, F	
Omnium					SR, TR	ER, PR				
Madison									Q, F	
500 m time trial							Q	F		
Pursuit									Q, F	
Points race							Q	F		
Scratch				F						
Elimination race							Q	F		

A = Afternoon session, E = Evening session
Q = qualifiers, R1 = first round, R2 = second round, R = repechages, ^{1}/_{16} = sixteenth finals, ^{1}/_{8} = eighth finals, QF = quarterfinals, SF = semifinals,
SR = Scratch Race, TR = Tempo Race, ER = Elimination Race, PR = Points Race

== Events ==
Event	Gold		Silver		Bronze	
Men's events
Sprint	Harrie Lavreysen; Netherlands		Mateusz Rudyk; Poland		Mikhail Yakovlev; Israel	
Team sprint	Netherlands; Jeffrey Hoogland; Harrie Lavreysen; Roy van den Berg; Tijmen van Loon	41.958^{G}	France; Florian Grengbo; Rayan Helal; Sébastien Vigier	42.718^{G}	Poland; Daniel Rochna; Mateusz Rudyk; Rafał Sarnecki; Maciej Bielecki	43.177^{B}
Team pursuit	Great Britain; Daniel Bigham; Ethan Hayter; Charlie Tanfield; Ethan Vernon; Oliver Wood	3:45.218^{G}	Denmark; Carl-Frederik Bévort; Tobias Hansen; Niklas Larsen; Rasmus Pedersen; Frederik Rodenberg	3:46.372^{G}	Italy; Davide Boscaro; Simone Consonni; Francesco Lamon; Jonathan Milan	3:49.974^{B}
Keirin	Harrie Lavreysen; Netherlands		Mateusz Rudyk; Poland		Stefano Moro; Italy	
Omnium	Ethan Hayter; Great Britain	121 pts	Niklas Larsen; Denmark	121 pts	Fabio Van den Bossche; Belgium	118 pts
Madison	Germany; Roger Kluge; Theo Reinhardt	64 pts	France; Thomas Boudat; Donavan Grondin	60 pts	Denmark; Michael Mørkøv; Theodor Storm	50 pts
1 km time trial^{[N]}	Matteo Bianchi; Italy	1:00.272	Daan Kool; Netherlands	1:00.414	Melvin Landerneau; France	1:00.472
Individual pursuit^{[N]}	Dan Bigham; Great Britain	4:05.783^{G}	Charlie Tanfield; Great Britain	4:07.777^{G}	Rasmus Pedersen; Denmark	4:10.119^{B}
Points race^{[O]}	Niklas Larsen; Denmark	66 pts	Sebastián Mora; Spain	58 pts	Oscar Nilsson-Julien; France	45 pts
Scratch^{[O]}	Iúri Leitão; Portugal		Tim Wafler; Austria		Tobias Hansen; Denmark	
Elimination race^{[O]}	Tobias Hansen; Denmark		William Tidball; Great Britain		Jules Hesters; Belgium	
Women's events
Sprint	Emma Finucane; Great Britain		Lea Friedrich; Germany		Emma Hinze; Germany	
Team sprint	Germany; Lea Friedrich; Pauline Grabosch; Emma Hinze	45.899^{G}	Great Britain; Sophie Capewell; Emma Finucane; Katy Marchant; Lowri Thomas	46.151^{G}	Netherlands; Kyra Lamberink; Hetty van de Wouw; Steffie van der Peet	46.754^{B}
Team pursuit	Italy; Elisa Balsamo; Martina Fidanza; Vittoria Guazzini; Letizia Paternoster	4:12.551^{G}	Great Britain; Megan Barker; Josie Knight; Anna Morris; Jessica Roberts; Neah Evans	4:15.950^{G}	Germany; Franziska Brauße; Lisa Klein; Lena Charlotte Reißner; Laura Süßemilch; Mieke Kröger	4:14.768^{B}
Keirin	Lea Sophie Friedrich; Germany		Emma Finucane; Great Britain		Hetty van de Wouw; Netherlands	
Omnium	Anita Stenberg; Norway	142 pts	Neah Evans; Great Britain	136 pts	Valentine Fortin; France	131 pts
Madison	France; Valentine Fortin; Marion Borras	50 pts	Belgium; Katrijn De Clercq; Lotte Kopecky	41 pts	Italy; Elisa Balsamo; Vittoria Guazzini	28 pts
500 m time trial^{[N]}	Katy Marchant; Great Britain	33.319	Taky Marie-Divine Kouamé; France	33.356	Pauline Grabosch; Germany	33.444
Individual pursuit^{[N]}	Josie Knight; Great Britain	3:22.816^{G}	Franziska Brauße; Germany	3:22.819^{G}	Anna Morris; Great Britain	3:22.934^{B}
Points race^{[O]}	Lotte Kopecky; Belgium	24 pts	Anita Stenberg; Norway	19 pts	Jarmila Machačová; Czech Republic	18 pts
Scratch^{[O]}	Clara Copponi; France		Lani Wittevrongel; Belgium		Martina Fidanza; Italy	
Elimination race^{[O]}	Lotte Kopecky; Belgium		Lea Lin Teutenberg; Germany		Jessica Roberts; Great Britain	

- Competitors named in italics only participated in rounds prior to the final.
- ^{^{N}} These events are not contested in the Olympics.
- ^{^{O}} In the Olympics, these events are contested within the omnium only.

== Medal table ==
Rank	Nation	Gold	Silver	Bronze	Total
1	Great Britain	6	6	2	14
2	Germany	3	3	3	9
3	Netherlands*	3	1	2	6
4	France	2	3	3	8
5	Denmark	2	2	3	7
6	Belgium	2	2	2	6
7	Italy	2	0	4	6
8	Norway	1	1	0	2
9	Portugal	1	0	0	1
10	Poland	0	2	1	3
11	Austria	0	1	0	1
11	Spain	0	1	0	1
13	Czech Republic	0	0	1	1
13	Israel	0	0	1	1
Totals (14 entries)		22	22	22	66
