= Roy van den Berg =

Dutch track cyclist (born 1988)

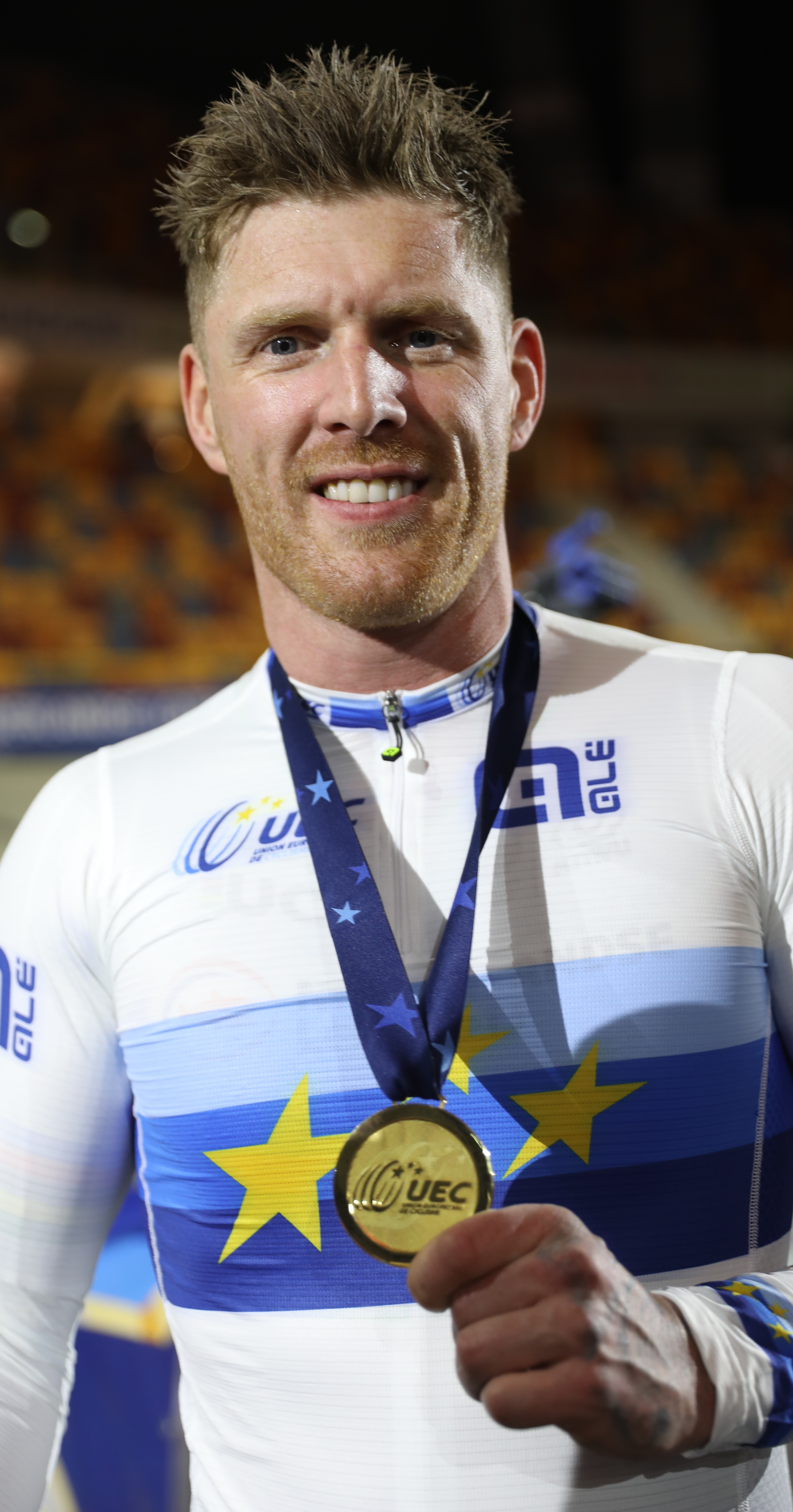
- Van den Berg in 2024

Personal information
- Born: 8 September 1988 (age 38) Kampen, Netherlands
- Height: 1.80 m (5 ft 11 in)
- Weight: 88 kg (194 lb)

Cycling career
- Sport: Cycling
- Discipline: Track
- Role: Rider
- Rider type: Sprinter

Professional team
- 2017–2020: BEAT Cycling Club
Medal record
Men's track cycling
Representing the Netherlands
Olympic Games
Gold medal – first place	2020 Tokyo	Team sprint
Gold medal – first place	2024 Paris	Team sprint
World Championships
Gold medal – first place	2019 Pruszków	Team sprint
Gold medal – first place	2020 Berlin	Team sprint
Gold medal – first place	2021 Roubaix	Team sprint
Gold medal – first place	2023 Glasgow	Team sprint
Gold medal – first place	2024 Ballerup	Team sprint
Gold medal – first place	2025 Santiago	Team sprint
Gold medal – first place	2026 Shanghai	Team sprint
Silver medal – second place	2022 Saint-Quentin-en-Yvelines	Team sprint
European Games
Gold medal – first place	2019 Minsk	Team sprint
European Championships
Gold medal – first place	2018 Glasgow	Team sprint
Gold medal – first place	2019 Apeldoorn	Team sprint
Gold medal – first place	2021 Grenchen	Team sprint
Gold medal – first place	2022 Munich	Team sprint
Gold medal – first place	2023 Grenchen	Team sprint
Gold medal – first place	2024 Apeldoorn	Team sprint
Silver medal – second place	2016 Yvelines	Sprint

Roy van den Berg (born 8 September 1988) is a Dutch track cyclist, who most recently rode for UCI Track Team BEAT Cycling Club. He was a part of a team that won the gold medal at the 2020 Summer olympics in the team sprint event, setting the new Olympic record in the finals. He also competed at the UCI Track Cycling World Championships in 2010, 2011, 2012, 2019 and 2020 and won the silver medal at the 2016 UEC European Track Championships in the sprint.

== See also ==
- List of European records in track cycling
