= 2023 UEC European Track Championships =

Cycling championships

- Venue: Grenchen, Switzerland
- Date: 8–12 February
- Velodrome: Tissot Velodrome
- Nations participating: 26
- Events: 22 (11 women, 11 men)

The 2023 UEC European Track Championships were the fourteenth edition of the elite UEC European Track Championships in track cycling and took place at the Tissot Velodrome in Grenchen, Switzerland, from 8 to 12 February 2023.

== Schedule ==
Competition	F	Final

Men
Date →	Wed 8		Thu 9		Fri 10		Sat 11		Sun 12	
Event ↓	A	E	A	E	A	E	A	E	A	E
Sprint					Q, ^{1}/_{16}, ^{1}/_{8}	QF		SF, F		
Team sprint	Q	R1, F								
Team pursuit	Q		R1	F						
Keirin									R1, R	R2, F
Omnium							SR, TR	ER, PR		
Madison										F
1 km time trial			Q	F						
Pursuit					Q	F				
Points race				F						
Scratch						F				
Elimination race		F								

Women
Date →	Wed 8		Thu 9		Fri 10		Sat 11		Sun 12	
Event ↓	A	E	A	E	A	E	A	E	A	E
Sprint			Q, ^{1}/_{16}, ^{1}/_{8}	QF		SF, F				
Team sprint	Q	R1, F								
Team pursuit	Q		R1	F						
Keirin									R1, R	R2, F
Omnium					SR, TR	ER, PR				
Madison										F
500 m time trial							Q	F		
Pursuit							Q	F		
Points race								F		
Scratch		F								
Elimination race				F						

A = Afternoon session, E = Evening session
Q = qualifiers, R1 = first round, R2 = second round, R = repechages, ^{1}/_{16} = sixteenth finals, ^{1}/_{8} = eighth finals, QF = quarterfinals, SF = semifinals,
SR = Scratch Race, TR = Tempo Race, ER = Elimination Race, PR = Points Race

== Events ==
Event	Gold		Silver		Bronze	
Men's events
Sprint	Harrie Lavreysen; Netherlands		Mateusz Rudyk; Poland		Rayan Helal; France	
Team sprint	Netherlands; Jeffrey Hoogland; Harrie Lavreysen; Roy van den Berg; Tijmen van Loon	42.325	Great Britain; Jack Carlin; Alistair Fielding; Hamish Turnbull; Joseph Truman	43.565	France; Timmy Gillion; Melvin Landerneau; Sébastien Vigier	43.332
Team pursuit	Italy; Filippo Ganna; Francesco Lamon; Jonathan Milan; Manlio Moro; Simone Consonni	3:47.667	Great Britain; Daniel Bigham; Charlie Tanfield; Ethan Vernon; Oliver Wood	3:48.800	France; Thomas Denis; Corentin Ermenault; Quentin Lafargue; Benjamin Thomas; Adrien Garel	3:49.837
Keirin	Harrie Lavreysen; Netherlands		Patryk Rajkowski; Poland		Jeffrey Hoogland; Netherlands	
Omnium	Benjamin Thomas; France	162 pts	Simone Consonni; Italy	146 pts	William Perrett; Great Britain	136 pts
Madison	Germany; Roger Kluge; Theo Reinhardt	43 pts	Italy; Simone Consonni; Michele Scartezzini	34 pts	France; Donavan Grondin; Benjamin Thomas	32 pts
1 km time trial^{[N]}	Jeffrey Hoogland; Netherlands	58.203	Alejandro Martínez; Spain	59.687	Maximilian Dörnbach; Germany	59.778
Individual pursuit^{[N]}	Jonathan Milan; Italy	4:03.744	Daniel Bigham; Great Britain	4:05.860	Tobias Buck-Gramcko; Germany	4:09.796
Points race^{[O]}	Simone Consonni; Italy	54 pts	Albert Torres; Spain	51 pts	Donavan Grondin; France	48 pts
Scratch^{[O]}	Oliver Wood; Great Britain		Roy Eefting; Netherlands		Donavan Grondin; France	
Elimination race^{[O]}	Tim Torn Teutenberg; Germany		Rui Oliveira; Portugal		Philip Heijnen; Netherlands	
Women's events
Sprint	Lea Friedrich; Germany		Pauline Grabosch; Germany		Sophie Capewell; Great Britain	
Team sprint	Germany; Lea Friedrich; Pauline Grabosch; Emma Hinze; Alessa-Catriona Pröpster	46.865	Great Britain; Lauren Bell; Emma Finucane; Katy Marchant; Sophie Capewell	47.639	Netherlands; Kyra Lamberink; Hetty van de Wouw; Steffie van der Peet	47.431
Team pursuit	Great Britain; Katie Archibald; Neah Evans; Josie Knight; Anna Morris; Elinor Barker	4:13.890	Italy; Martina Alzini; Elisa Balsamo; Martina Fidanza; Vittoria Guazzini; Letizia Paternoster	4:16.018	Germany; Franziska Brauße; Lisa Klein; Mieke Kröger; Laura Süßemilch	4:14.402
Keirin	Lea Friedrich; Germany		Emma Finucane; Great Britain		Emma Hinze; Germany	
Omnium	Katie Archibald; Great Britain	155 pts	Daria Pikulik; Poland	124 pts	Lotte Kopecky; Belgium	124 pts
Madison	Great Britain; Katie Archibald; Elinor Barker	38 pts	France; Victoire Berteau; Clara Copponi	25 pts	Italy; Elisa Balsamo; Vittoria Guazzini	19 pts
500 m time trial^{[N]}	Emma Hinze; Germany	32.947	Taky Marie-Divine Kouamé; France	33.390	Hetty van de Wouw; Netherlands	33.554
Individual pursuit^{[N]}	Franziska Brauße; Germany	3:20.101	Josie Knight; Great Britain	3:23.613	Mieke Kröger; Germany	3:24.895
Points race^{[O]}	Anita Stenberg; Norway	56 pts	Shari Bossuyt; Belgium	42 pts	Marie Le Net; France	34 pts
Scratch^{[O]}	Maria Martins; Portugal		Eukene Larrarte; Spain		Daria Pikulik; Poland	
Elimination race^{[O]}	Lotte Kopecky; Belgium		Valentine Fortin; France		Maike van der Duin; Netherlands	

- Competitors named in italics only participated in rounds prior to the final.
- ^{^{N}} These events are not contested in the Olympics.
- ^{^{O}} In the Olympics, these events are contested within the omnium only.

== Medal table ==
Rank	Nation	Gold	Silver	Bronze	Total
1	Germany	7	1	5	13
2	Great Britain	4	6	2	12
3	Netherlands	4	1	5	10
4	Italy	3	3	1	7
5	France	1	3	7	11
6	Belgium	1	1	1	3
7	Portugal	1	1	0	2
8	Norway	1	0	0	1
9	Poland	0	3	1	4
10	Spain	0	3	0	3
Totals (10 entries)		22	22	22	66
