= Tijmen van Loon =

Dutch cyclist (born 2001)

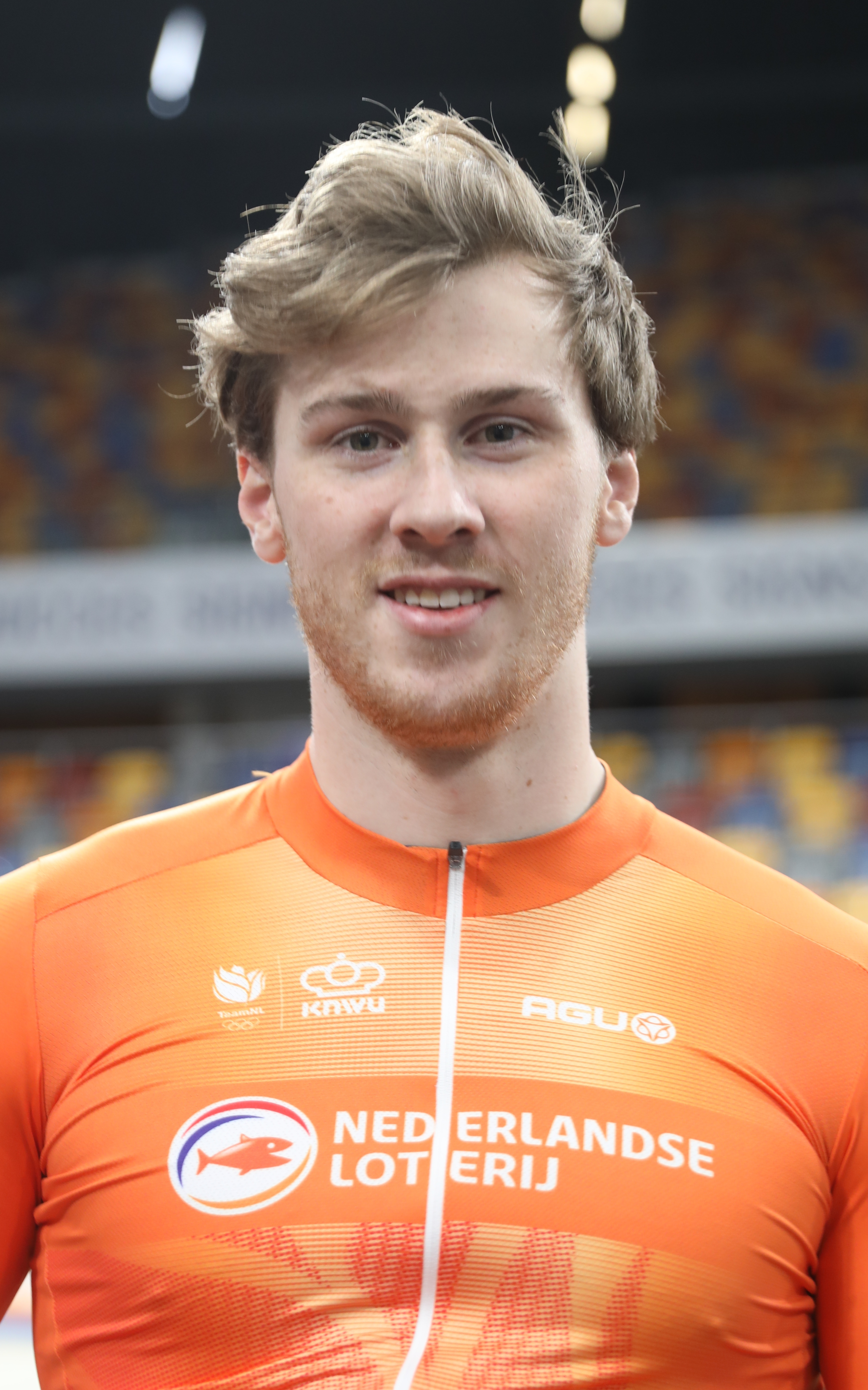
- Van Loon in 2024

Personal information
- Born: 20 March 2001 (age 25) Amstelveen, Netherlands

Cycling career
- Sport: Cycling
- Current team: BEAT CC p/b Saxo
- Discipline: Track
- Role: Rider
- Rider type: Sprinter

Professional team
- 2022–: BEAT Cycling
Medal record
Men's track cycling
Representing the Netherlands
European Championships
Gold medal – first place	2023 Grenchen	Team sprint
Gold medal – first place	2024 Apeldoorn	Team sprint
Silver medal – second place	2025 Heusden-Zolder	Team sprint

Tijmen van Loon (born 20 March 2001) is a Dutch track cyclist, who competes in sprinting events.

Van Loon became the European Champion in the sprint event at the 2022 UEC European Under-23 Track Championships. He also competed at the 2022 UEC European Track Championships in the sprint event where he was eliminated in the quarter-finals.

Van Loon studies political science at the Radboud University Nijmegen.

== Major results ==
2018
1st Sprint, National Junior Championships
2019
2nd Team sprint, National Championships
3rd Team sprint, UEC European Junior Championships
2021
National Championships

1st Kilometer
1st Team sprint
3rd Keirin
3rd Sprint

2022
1st Sprint, UEC European Under-23 Championships
1st Kilometer, National Championships
UCI Nations Cup

1st Team sprint, Milton
3rd Team sprint, Glasgow

2023
1st Team sprint, UEC European Championships
