= Daniel Rochna =

Polish cyclist

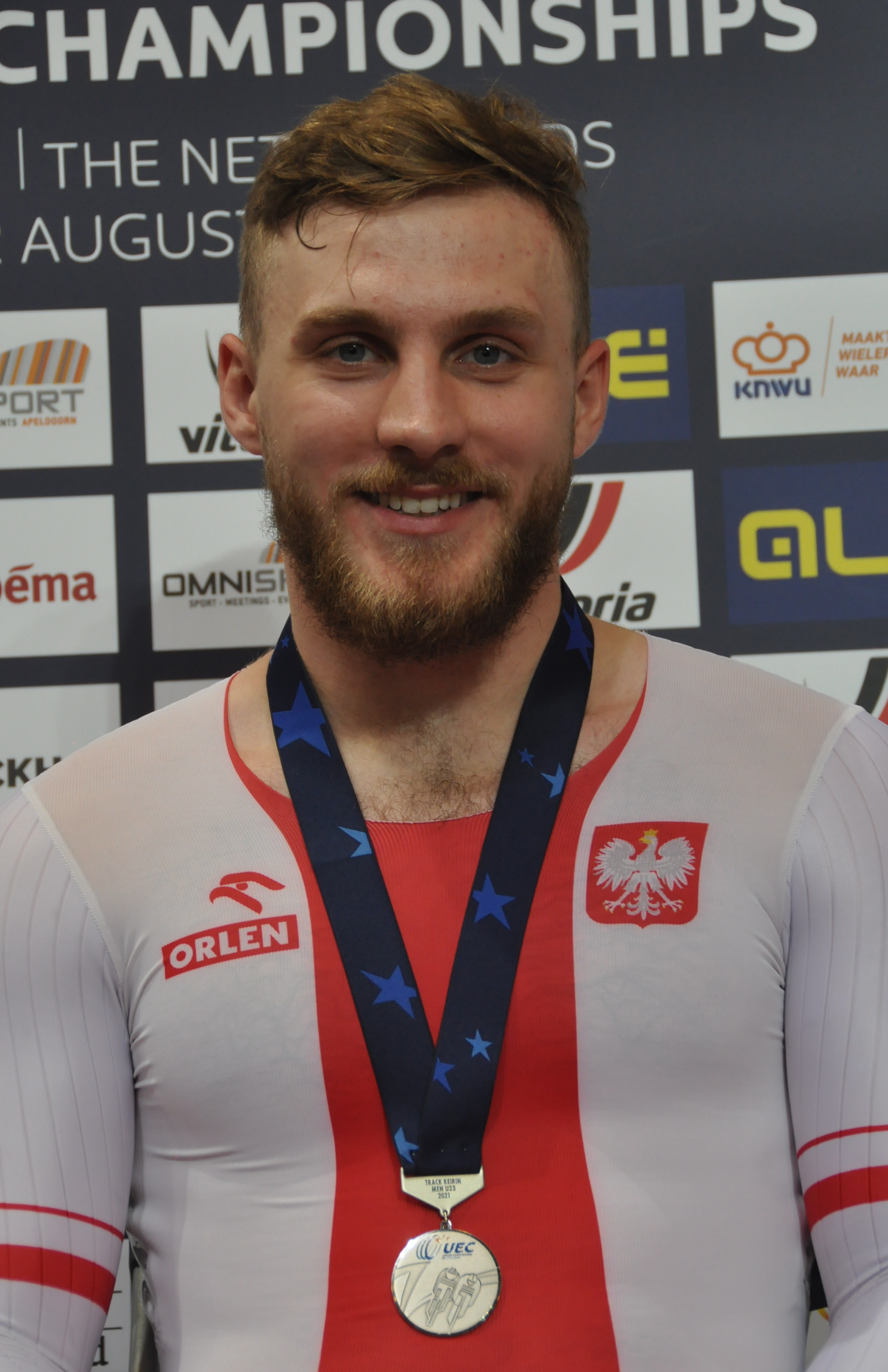
- Rochna in 2021

Personal information
- Born: 30 August 1999 (age 27)

Cycling career
- Sport: Cycling
- Discipline: Track
- Role: Rider
- Rider type: Sprinter
Medal record
Men's track cycling
Representing Poland
European Championships
Bronze medal – third place	2021 Grenchen	Team sprint
Bronze medal – third place	2024 Apeldoorn	Team sprint
UCI Junior World Championships
Silver medal – second place	2017 Montichiari	Keirin
UEC European Under-23 Championships
Silver medal – second place	2021 Anadia	Keirin
UEC European Junior Championships
Silver medal – second place	2016 Montichiari	Team sprint
Silver medal – second place	2017 Anadia	Keirin
Silver medal – second place	2017 Anadia	Team sprint

Daniel Rochna (born 30 August 1999) is a Polish professional track cyclist who competes in sprinting events. He won a bronze medal in the team sprint at the 2021 and 2024 UEC European Track Championships.
