= Timmy Gillion =

French cyclist

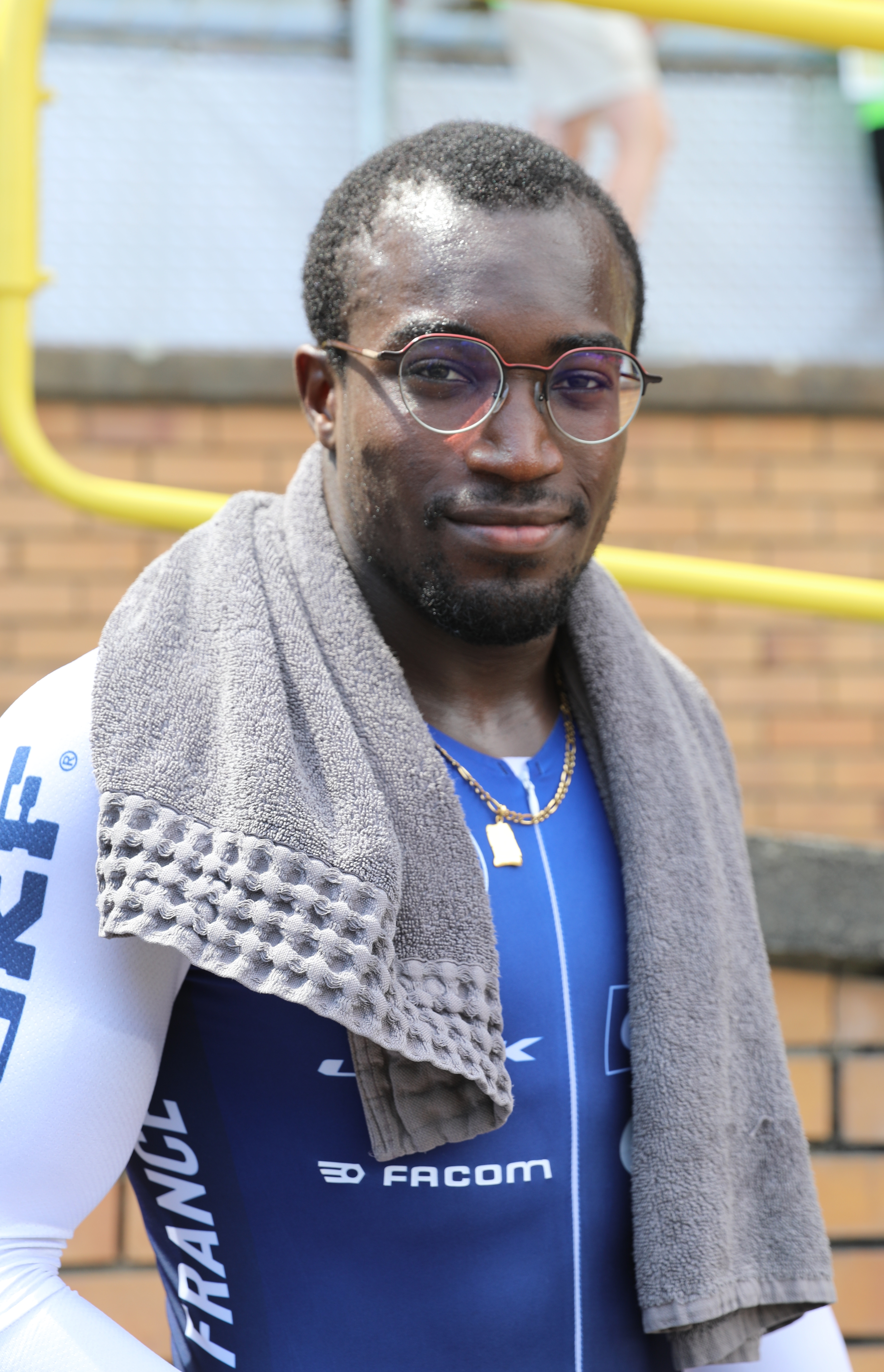
- Timmy Gillion (2024)

Personal information
- Born: 16 March 2002 (age 24) Perpignan, France

Cycling career
- Sport: Cycling
- Discipline: Track
- Role: Rider
- Rider type: Sprinter
Medal record
Men's track cycling
Representing France
European Championships
Gold medal – first place	2025 Heusden-Zolder	Team sprint
Gold medal – first place	2026 Konya	Team sprint
Silver medal – second place	2021 Grenchen	Team sprint
Silver medal – second place	2022 Munich	Team sprint
Bronze medal – third place	2023 Grenchen	Team sprint

Timmy Gillion (born 16 March 2002) is a French track cyclist, who competes in sprint events. He won a silver medal in the Team sprint at the 2021 UEC European Track Championships.
