= Hamish Turnbull =

British cyclist (born 1999)

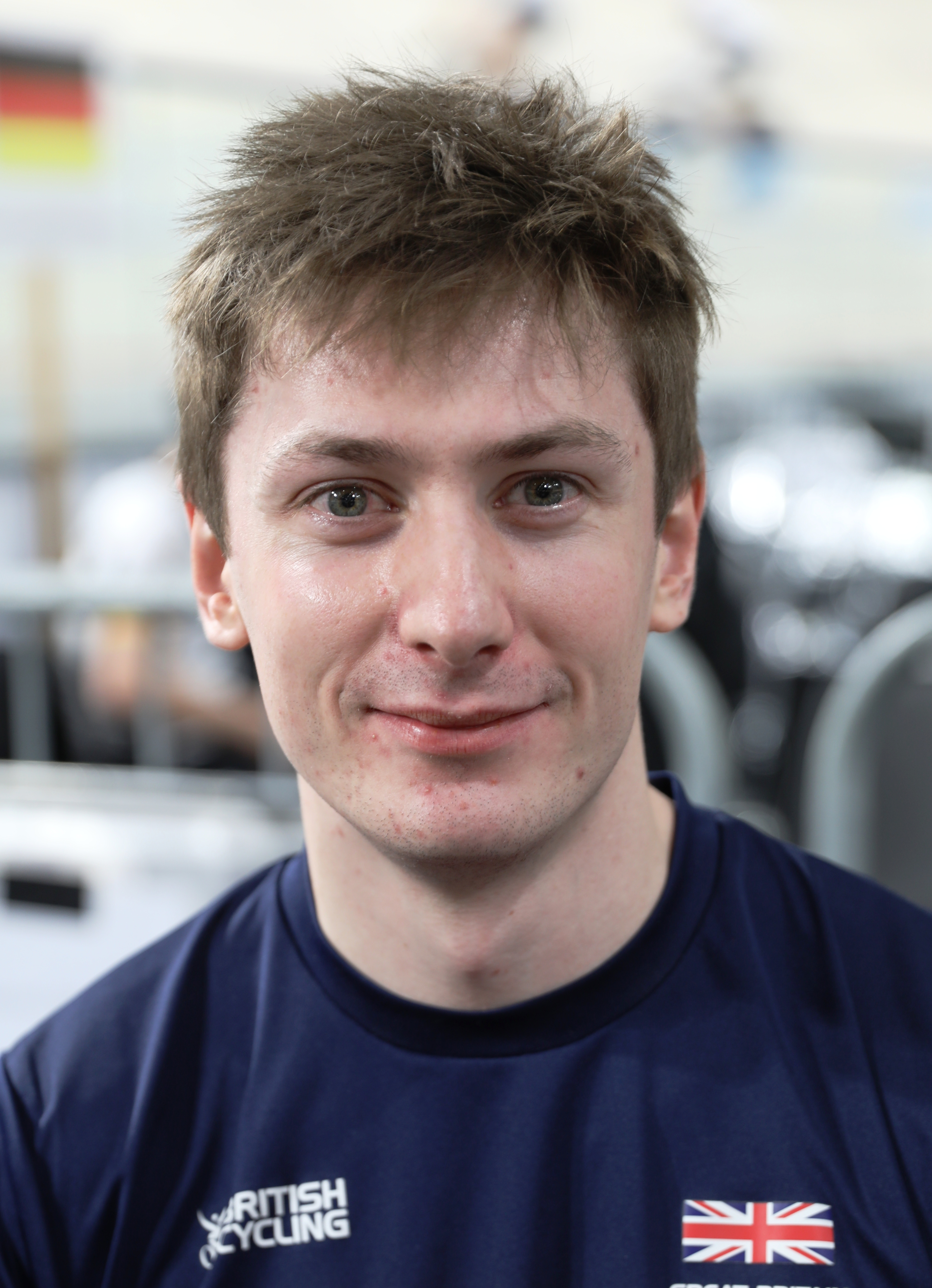
- Turnbull in 2024

Personal information
- Full name: William Hamish Turnbull
- Nicknames: The Mish, The Morpeth Mish
- Born: 13 July 1999 (age 27) Morpeth, Northumberland, England
- Height: 1.83 m (6 ft 0 in)
- Weight: 81 kg (179 lb)

Cycling career
- Sport: Cycling
- Current team: Slingshot
- Discipline: Track Sprint
- Role: Rider
- Rider type: Sprinter
Medal record
Men's track cycling
Representing Great Britain
Olympic Games
Silver medal – second place	2024 Paris	Team sprint
World Championships
Silver medal – second place	2025 Santiago	Team sprint
Bronze medal – third place	2022 Saint-Quentin-en-Yvelines	Team sprint
European Championships
Silver medal – second place	2023 Grenchen	Team sprint
Silver medal – second place	2026 Konya	Team sprint
Bronze medal – third place	2022 Munich	Team sprint
Representing England
Commonwealth Games
Silver medal – second place	2022 Birmingham	Team sprint
Silver medal – second place	2026 Glasgow	Team sprint

William Hamish Turnbull (born 13 July 1999) is an English track cyclist specialising in sprint events. Representing Great Britain, he won a silver medal in the team sprint at the 2024 Summer Olympics.

== Career ==
Turnbull earned a place in the British cycling squad at the age of 14.

He became British champion for the first time after winning the Sprint Championship at the 2020 British National Track Championships. He had finished third in 2019. At the 2022 British National Track Championships in Newport, Wales he won another British title after winning the team sprint alongside Jack Carlin, Joseph Truman and Ali Fielding. He also won two bronze medals, in the sprint and the keirin, at the same Championships. Turnbull won his third national title at the 2023 British Cycling National Track Championships, he won the Keirin for the first time.

Turnbull represented England at the 2022 Commonwealth Games. The competition started strongly for Turnbull as he won the first medal of his elite career, a silver, in the team sprint alongside Truman and Ryan Owens. In the sprint event, he made it to the quarterfinals but was knocked out by Scottish rider, and usual Team GB teammate, Carlin. In the keirin, Turnbull finished 9th overall.

He won a bronze medal in the team sprint with Carlin and Fielding at the 2022 European Championships. In the sprint event he finished 4th, losing out in the bronze medal final to Rayan Helal. Turnbull finished 8th overall in the keirin.

Turnbull won his first World Championship medal, a bronze, at the 2022 World Championships in the team sprint. In the sprint, he advanced to the quarterfinals where he was beaten by Harrie Lavreysen, who would go on to secure his third consecutive sprint world title.

At the 2023 European Championships, Turnbull won silver in the team sprint, beaten to gold by the Netherlands. In the sprint, he was knocked out by teammate Carlin in the 1/8 finals. In the keirin, Turnbull finished 10th overall, just behind Carlin in 9th.

On 24 June 2024, Turnbull was named in the Great Britain squad for the 2024 Summer Olympics. At the Games in Paris, he won a silver medal with Ed Lowe and Jack Carlin in the team sprint, losing out in the final to a strong Dutch team, who set a new world record. In the sprint, Turnbull was knocked out by Jeffrey Hoogland of the Netherlands in the quarter-finals after it went to a deciding race. In the keirin, he made it through to the semi-finals, but did not advance due to a last-lap crash.

At the 2025 Track Cycling World Championships in Santiago, Truman, along with teammates Matthew Richardson, Joseph Truman and Harry Ledingham-Horn, claimed a silver medal in the team sprint for Great Britain. Turnbull competed in the final, replacing Ledingham-Horn, having not taken part in the earlier qualifying round.

At the 2026 Commonwealth Games in Glasgow, Turnbull, Truman and Ledingham-Horn won silver in the team sprint. The English trio were defeated by Australia in the gold medal race.

== Major results ==
2022
UCI Track Cycling World Championships

3rd Team sprint (with Jack Carlin and Alistair Fielding)

European Track Championships

3rd Team sprint (with Jack Carlin and Alistair Fielding)

Commonwealth Games

2nd Team sprint (with Ryan Owens and Joseph Truman)

2023
European Track Championships

2nd Team sprint (with Jack Carlin, Alistair Fielding and Ed Lowe)

2024
Olympic Games

2nd Team sprint (with Jack Carlin and Ed Lowe)

2025
UCI Track Cycling World Championships

2nd Team sprint (with Harry Ledingham-Horn, Joseph Truman and Matthew Richardson)

2026
Commonwealth Games

2nd Team sprint (with Harry Ledingham-Horn and Joseph Truman)
