= Alistair Fielding =

British cyclist

Ali Fielding
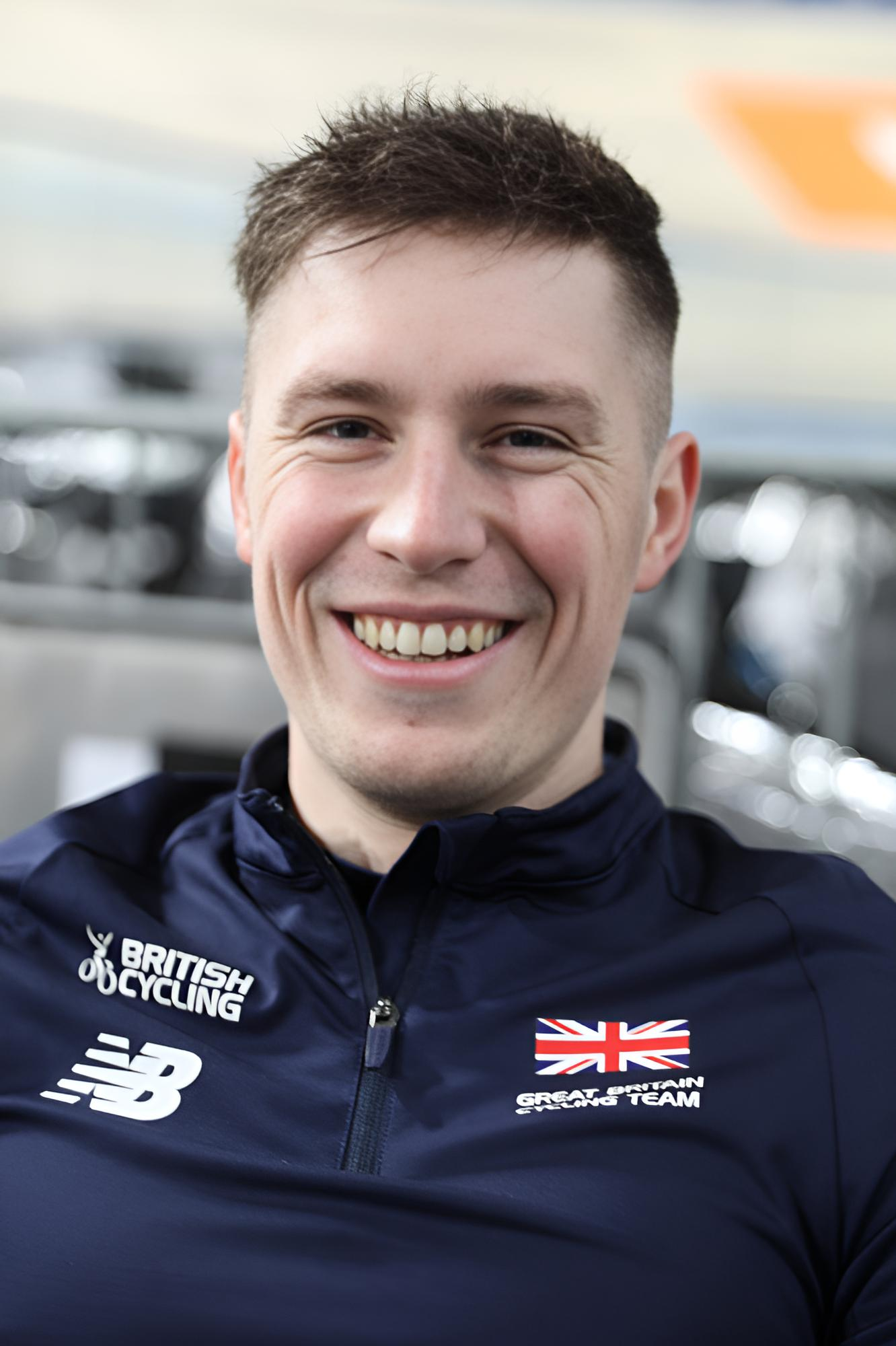
- Alistair Fielding (2024)

Personal information
- Nickname: Ali Fielding
- Born: 3 March 2000 (age 26) Bournemouth, England

Cycling career
- Sport: Cycling
- Current team: Team GB / Inspired
- Discipline: Track cycling
- Role: Rider
- Rider type: Team sprint, sprint, keirin
Medal record
Men's track cycling
Representing Great Britain
World Championships
Bronze medal – third place	2022 Saint-Quentin-en-Yvelines	Team sprint
European Championships
Silver medal – second place	2023 Grenchen	Team sprint
Bronze medal – third place	2022 Munich	Team sprint

Alistair Fielding (born 3 March 2000) is a British and Scottish track cyclist.

== Cycling career ==
Fielding became a British champion when winning gold in the team sprint event at the 2022 British National Track Championships.

Fielding represented the Great Britain Cycling Team at the elite level for the first time at the UEC European Championships and World Championships in 2021. He has also represented Team Scotland at the 2022 Commonwealth Games.

== Major results ==
2019
2nd Team sprint, National Track Championships (with Lewis Stewart and Hamish Turnbull)
2020
National Track Championships

2nd Sprint
2nd Team sprint (with Hamish Turnbull and James Bunting)

2021
1st Team sprint, UEC U23 European Championships (with Hamish Turnbull, Hayden Norris and James Bunting)
2022
1st Team sprint, National Track Championships (with Jack Carlin, Joseph Truman and Hamish Turnbull)
