= Sébastien Vigier =

French cyclist

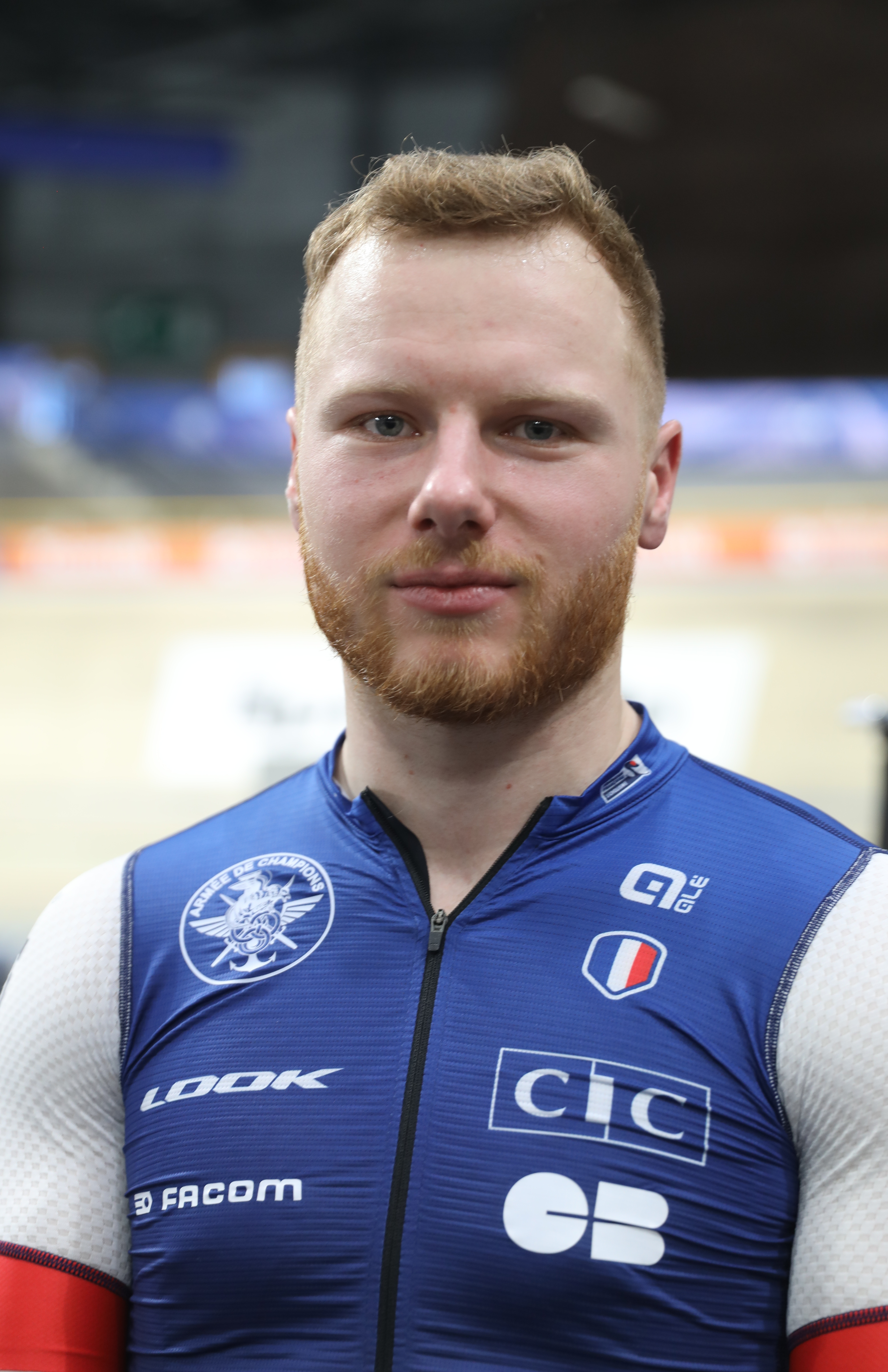
- Sebastien Vigier in 2024

Personal information
- Born: 18 April 1997 (age 29) Palaiseau, France

Cycling career
- Sport: Cycling
- Discipline: Track
- Role: Rider
- Rider type: Sprinter
Medal record
Men's track cycling
Representing France
Olympic Games
Bronze medal – third place	2020 Tokyo	Team sprint
World Championships
Silver medal – second place	2019 Pruszków	Team sprint
Silver medal – second place	2021 Roubaix	Team sprint
Bronze medal – third place	2017 Hong Kong	Team sprint
Bronze medal – third place	2018 Apeldoorn	Sprint
Bronze medal – third place	2018 Apeldoorn	Team sprint
Bronze medal – third place	2021 Roubaix	Sprint
Bronze medal – third place	2023 Glasgow	Team sprint
European Championships
Gold medal – first place	2017 Berlin	Sprint
Gold medal – first place	2017 Berlin	Team sprint
Gold medal – first place	2022 Munich	Sprint
Gold medal – first place	2022 Munich	Keirin
Gold medal – first place	2025 Heusden-Zolder	Team sprint
Silver medal – second place	2018 Glasgow	Keirin
Silver medal – second place	2018 Glasgow	Team sprint
Silver medal – second place	2021 Grenchen	Team sprint
Silver medal – second place	2022 Munich	Team sprint
Silver medal – second place	2024 Apeldoorn	Team sprint
Bronze medal – third place	2019 Apeldoorn	Team sprint
Bronze medal – third place	2023 Grenchen	Team sprint

Sébastien Vigier (born 18 April 1997) is a French track cyclist, who competes in sprinting events. He competed at the 2016 UEC European Track Championships in the team sprint event.

He competed in the sprint and team sprint events at the 2020 Summer Olympics, winning bronze in the latter.

== See also ==
- List of European Championship medalists in men's sprint
