= Mattia Predomo =

Italian cyclist (born 2004)

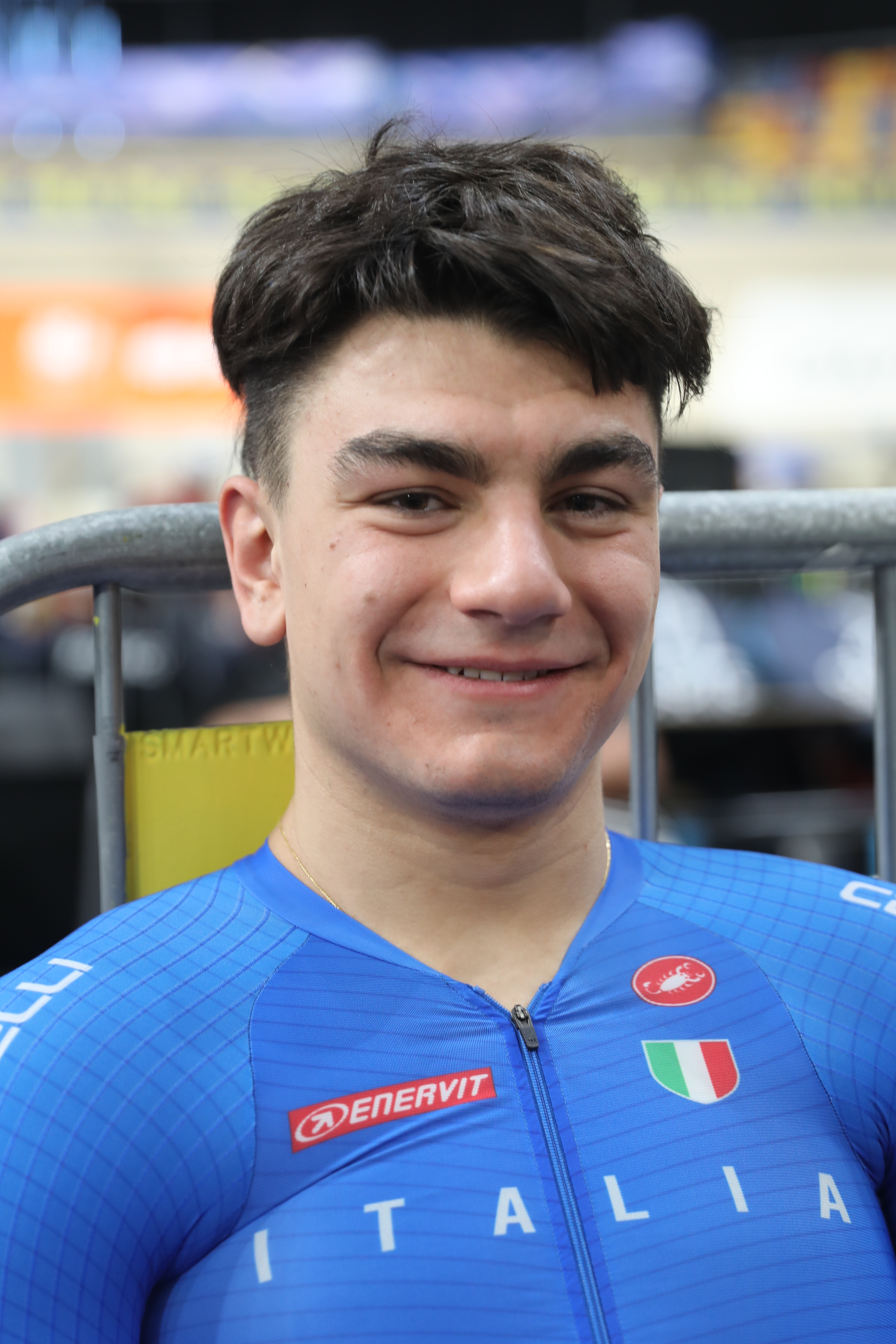
- Predomo in 2024

Personal information
- Born: 13 August 2004 (age 22) Bolzano, Italy
- Height: 1.70 m (5 ft 7 in)
- Weight: 74 kg (163 lb)

Cycling career
- Sport: Cycling
- Current team: Campana Imballagi–Morbiato–Trentino
- Discipline: Track
- Role: Rider
- Rider type: Sprinter

Amateur team
- 2021–2025: Campana Imballaggi Geo&Tex Trentino

Professional team
- 2026–: Campana Imballagi–Morbiato–Trentino
Medal record
Men's track cycling
Representing Italy
European Championships
Bronze medal – third place	2026 Konya	Team sprint
World Junior Championships
Gold medal – first place	2022 Tel Aviv	Keirin
Gold medal – first place	2022 Tel Aviv	Individual sprint
Silver medal – second place	2022 Tel Aviv	1 km time trial
Bronze medal – third place	2021 Cairo	Individual sprint

Mattia Predomo (born 13 August 2004) is an Italian track cyclist, who currently rides for UCI Continental team Campana Imballagi–Morbiato–Trentino. He has won medals at the European Championships as well as the UCI Junior World Championships.
