= Rayan Helal =

French cyclist (born 1999)

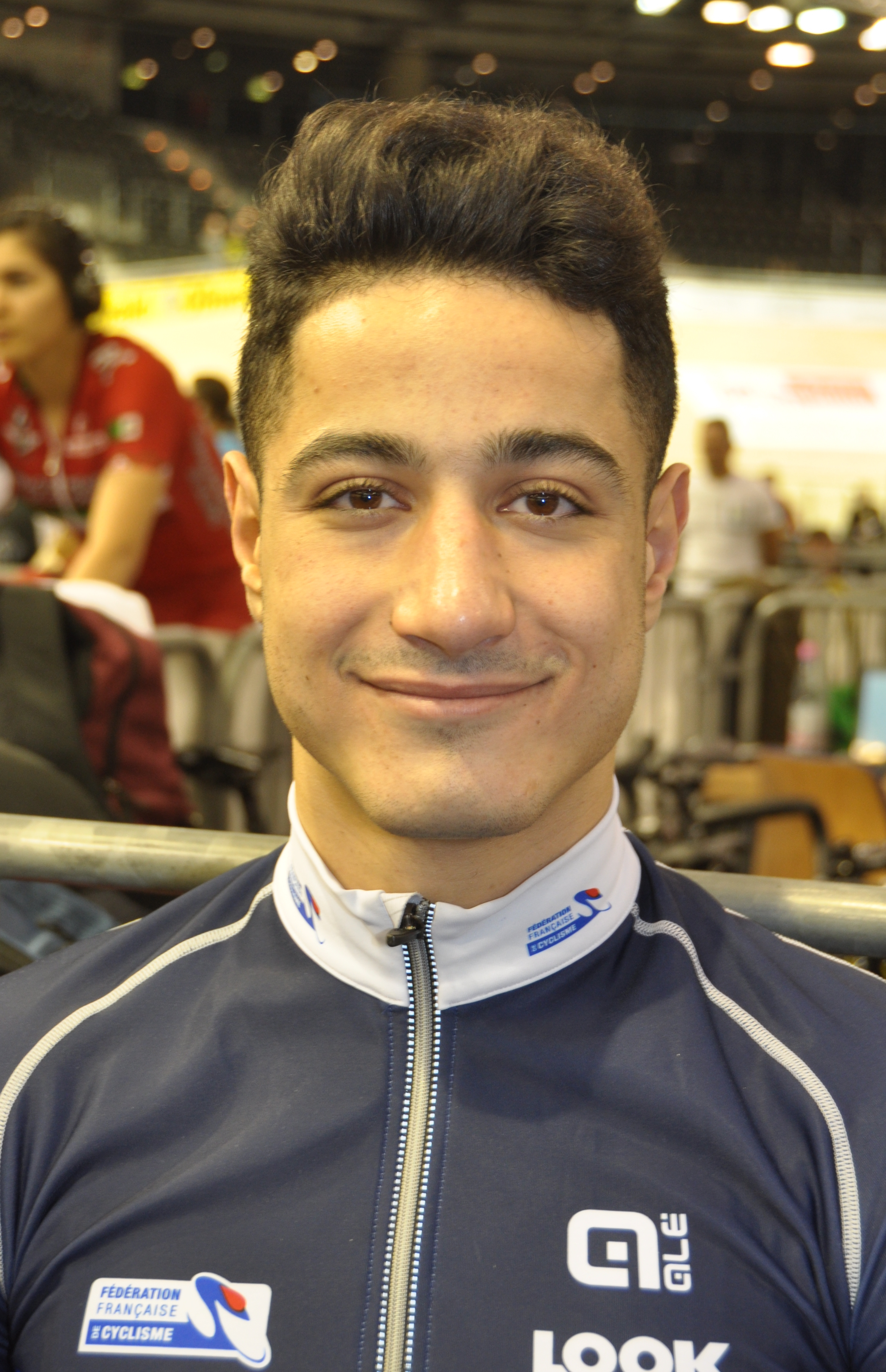
- Helal in 2018

Personal information
- Born: 21 January 1999 (age 27) Saint-Martin-d'Hères, France
- Height: 1.80 m (5 ft 11 in)
- Weight: 80 kg (176 lb)

Cycling career
- Sport: Cycling
- Discipline: Track
- Role: Rider
Medal record
Men's track cycling
Representing France
Olympic Games
Bronze medal – third place	2020 Tokyo	Team sprint
World Championships
Silver medal – second place	2021 Roubaix	Team sprint
Bronze medal – third place	2023 Glasgow	Team sprint
European Games
Silver medal – second place	2019 Minsk	Keirin
Silver medal – second place	2019 Minsk	Team sprint
European Championships
Gold medal – first place	2025 Heusden-Zolder	Team sprint
Gold medal – first place	2026 Konya	Team sprint
Silver medal – second place	2021 Grenchen	Team sprint
Silver medal – second place	2022 Munich	Team sprint
Silver medal – second place	2024 Apeldoorn	Team sprint
Bronze medal – third place	2022 Munich	Sprint
Bronze medal – third place	2023 Grenchen	Sprint
Bronze medal – third place	2025 Heusden-Zolder	Sprint

Rayan Helal (born 21 January 1999) is a French racing cyclist. He has competed at two Olympic Games, in Tokyo 2020 and Paris 2024. He won a bronze medal at the 2020 Games in men's team sprint.

== Career ==
He won gold in the sprint at the 2017 UEC European Track Championships in the junior category. At the 2017 UCI Junior Track Cycling World Championships, he won gold in the men's sprint.

In 2018, he won three events, the sprint, keirin and the team sprint in the under 23 category at the 2018 UEC European Track Championships. At the same event the following year, he did not defend his three titles, but managed to win medals in all three events again. He made his senior major championship debut at the 2018 UCI Track Cycling World Championships.

After the postponement of the 2020 Olympic Games, he was selected to compete at his first Olympic Games. He won bronze in the team sprint with Florian Grengbo and Sébastien Vigier. This continued the French streak on medaling in this event at every Olympic Games since it was first held in 2000. He also competed in the individual sprint and the keirin, reaching the B-final in the latter.

As a member of the French team sprint team, he won back-to-back medals 2021 UEC European Track Championships and the 2021 UCI Track Cycling World Championships.

== See also ==
- List of European Championship medalists in men's sprint
