= Rafał Sarnecki =

Polish cyclist (born 1990)

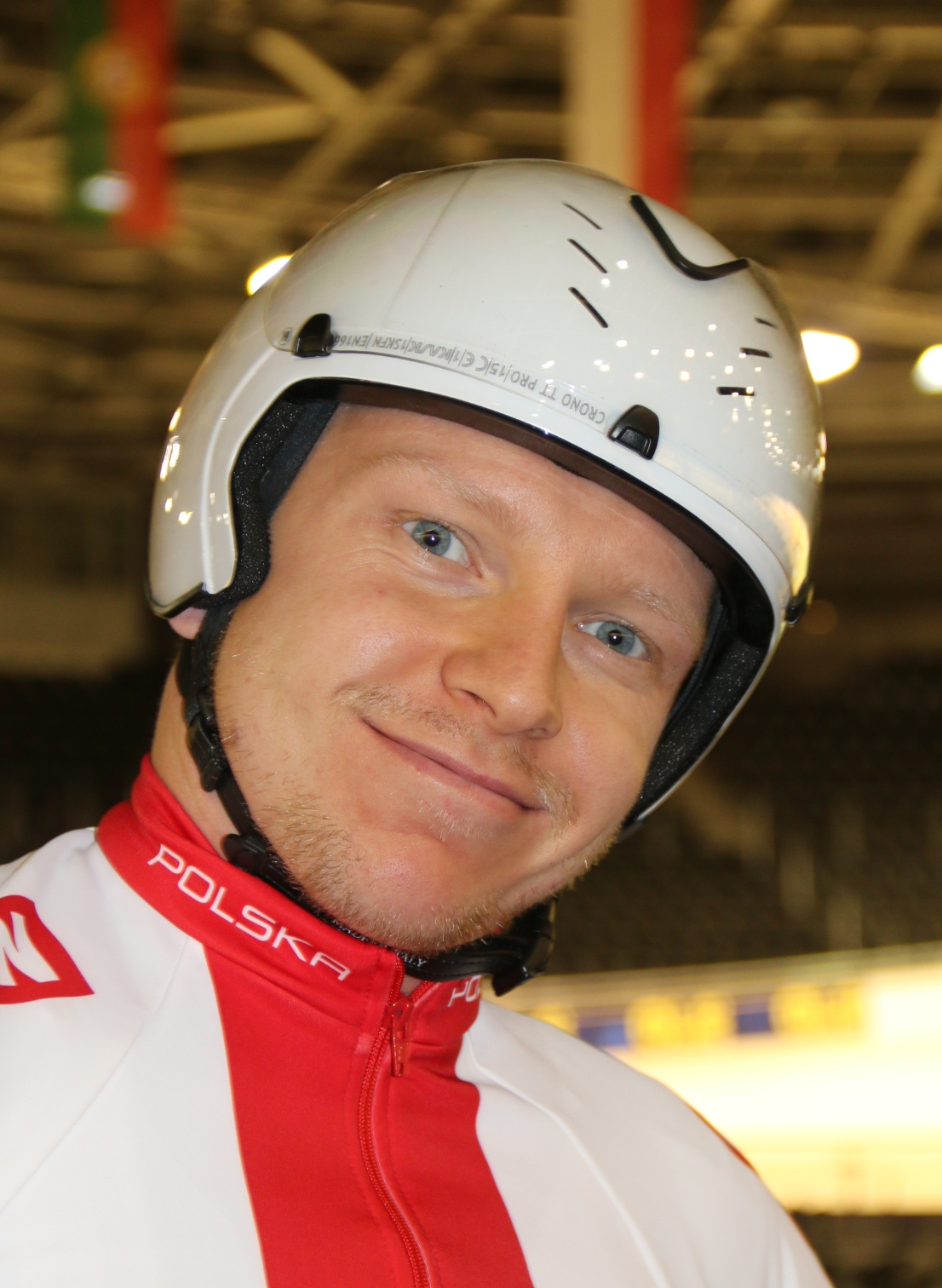
- Rafał Sarnecki (2017)

Personal information
- Born: 8 January 1990 (age 36) Grudziądz, Poland

Cycling career
- Sport: Cycling
- Discipline: Track
- Role: Rider
- Rider type: Sprinter
Medal record
Men's track cycling
Representing Poland
European Championships
Silver medal – second place	2015 Grenchen	Team sprint
Bronze medal – third place	2024 Apeldoorn	Team sprint

Rafał Sarnecki (born 8 January 1990) is a Polish professional track cyclist who competes in sprinting events. He rode at the 2015 UCI Track Cycling World Championships.
