= Marc Jurczyk =

German cyclist (born 1996)

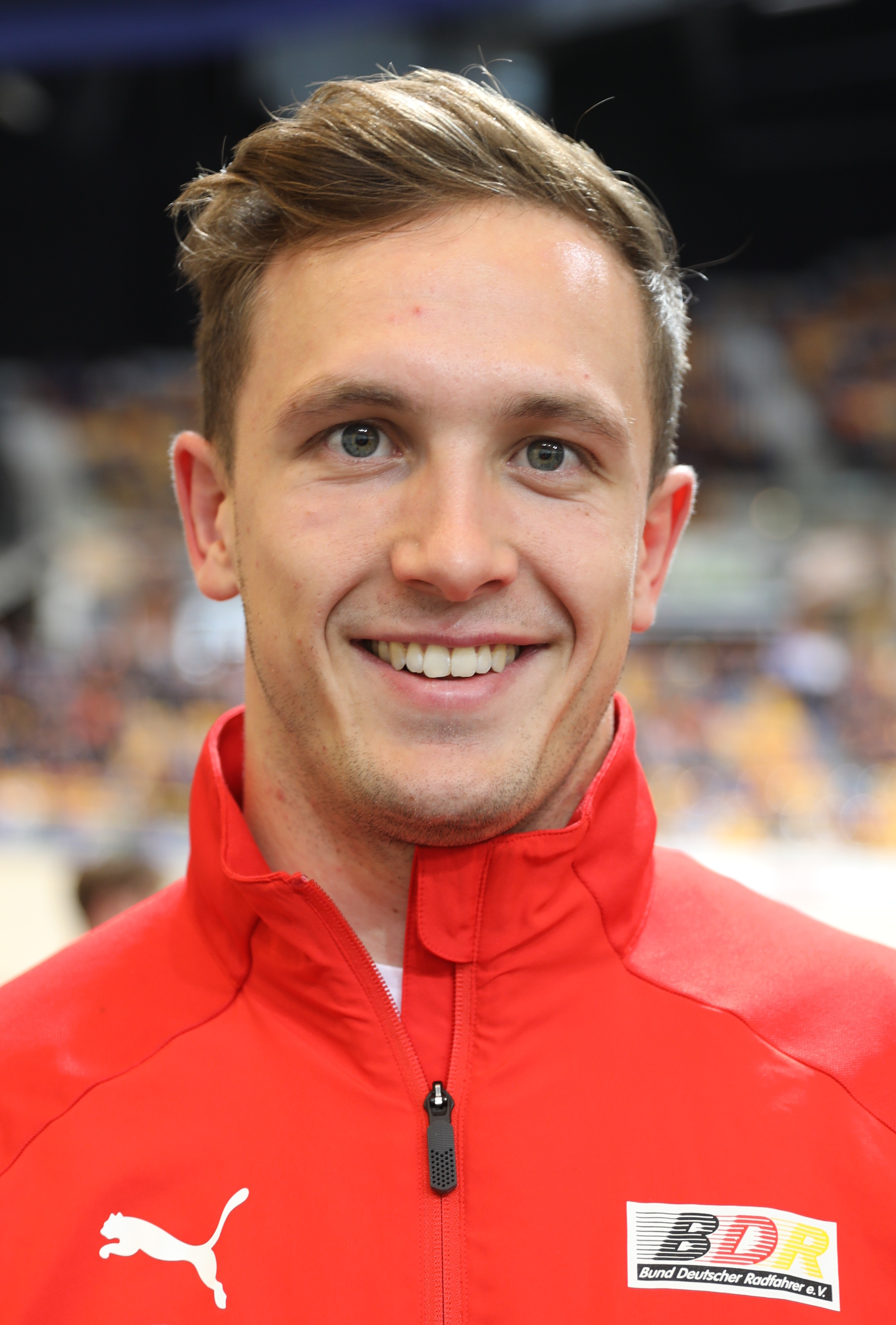
- Marc Jurczyk (in

Personal information
- Born: 21 January 1996 (age 30) Böblingen, Germany

Cycling career
- Sport: Cycling
- Discipline: Track
- Role: Rider
Medal record
Men's track cycling
Representing Germany
World Championships
Bronze medal – third place	2021 Roubaix	Team sprint

Marc Jurczyk (born 21 January 1996) is a German male track cyclist, representing Germany at international competitions. He competed at the 2016 UEC European Track Championships in the 1 km time trial event.
