= Matteo Bianchi =

Italian cyclist (born 2001)

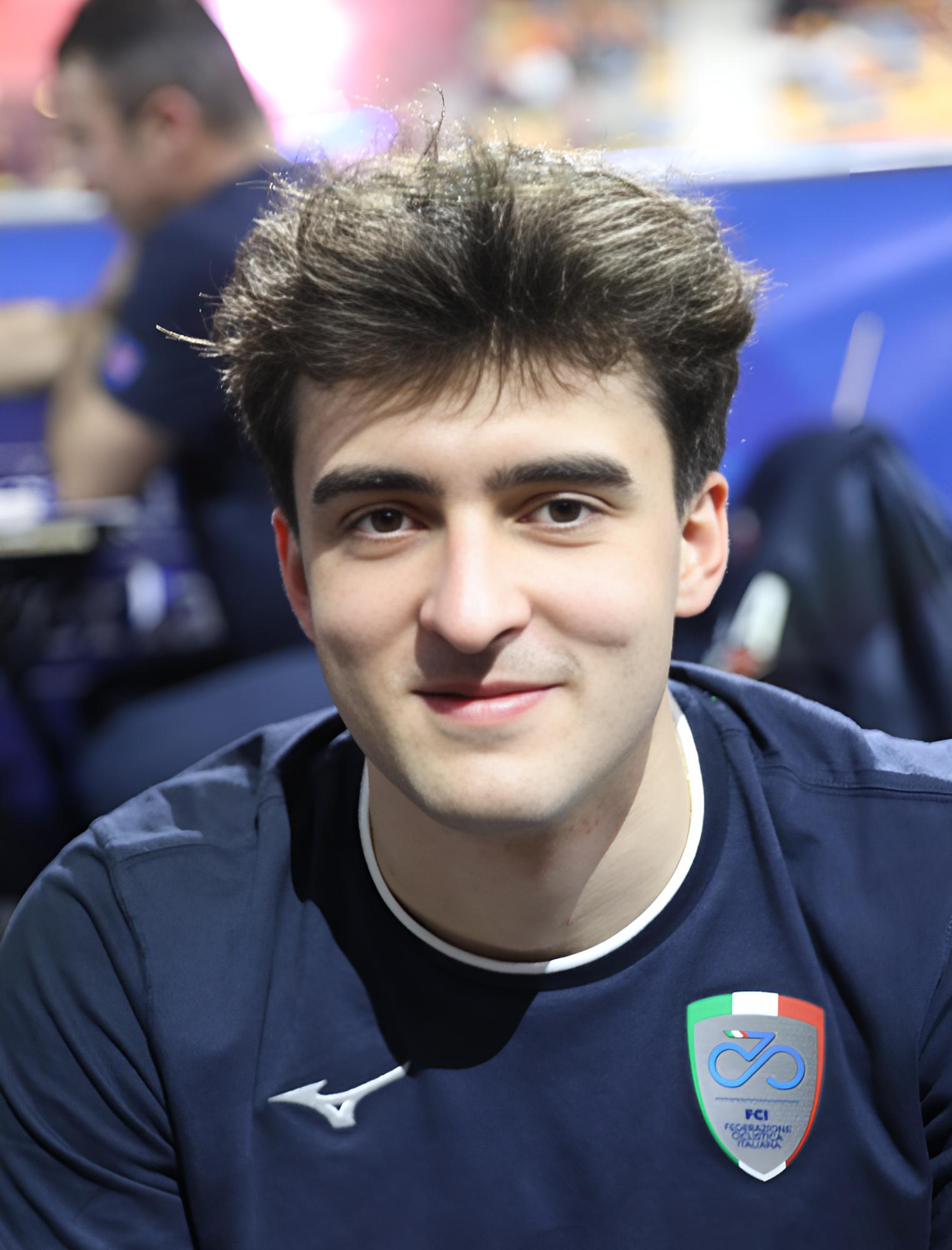
- Bianchi in 2024

Personal information
- Born: 21 October 2001 (age 24) Bozen, Italy

Cycling career
- Sport: Cycling
- Discipline: Track
- Role: Rider
- Rider type: Sprinter

Amateur teams
- 2019: Team Campana Imballaggi–Rotogal
- 2021: U.C. Trevigiani Campana Imballaggi
- 2022: Centro Sportivo Esercito
- 2023: Campana Imballaggi Geo&Tex Trentino
Medal record
Men's track cycling
Representing Italy
European Championships
Gold medal – first place	2024 Apeldoorn	1 km time trial
Gold medal – first place	2025 Heusden-Zolder	1 km time trial
Silver medal – second place	2022 Munich	1 km time trial
Bronze medal – third place	2026 Konya	Team sprint
World Junior Championships
Bronze medal – third place	2019 Frankfurt	Kilometer

Matteo Bianchi (born 21 October 2001) is an Italian track cyclist who has won several medals at the UEC European Track Championships.

== National records ==
- 1 km time trial: 59.661 ( (Germany) Munich, 15 August 2022) - current holder.
