= Mateusz Rudyk =

Polish cyclist (born 1995)

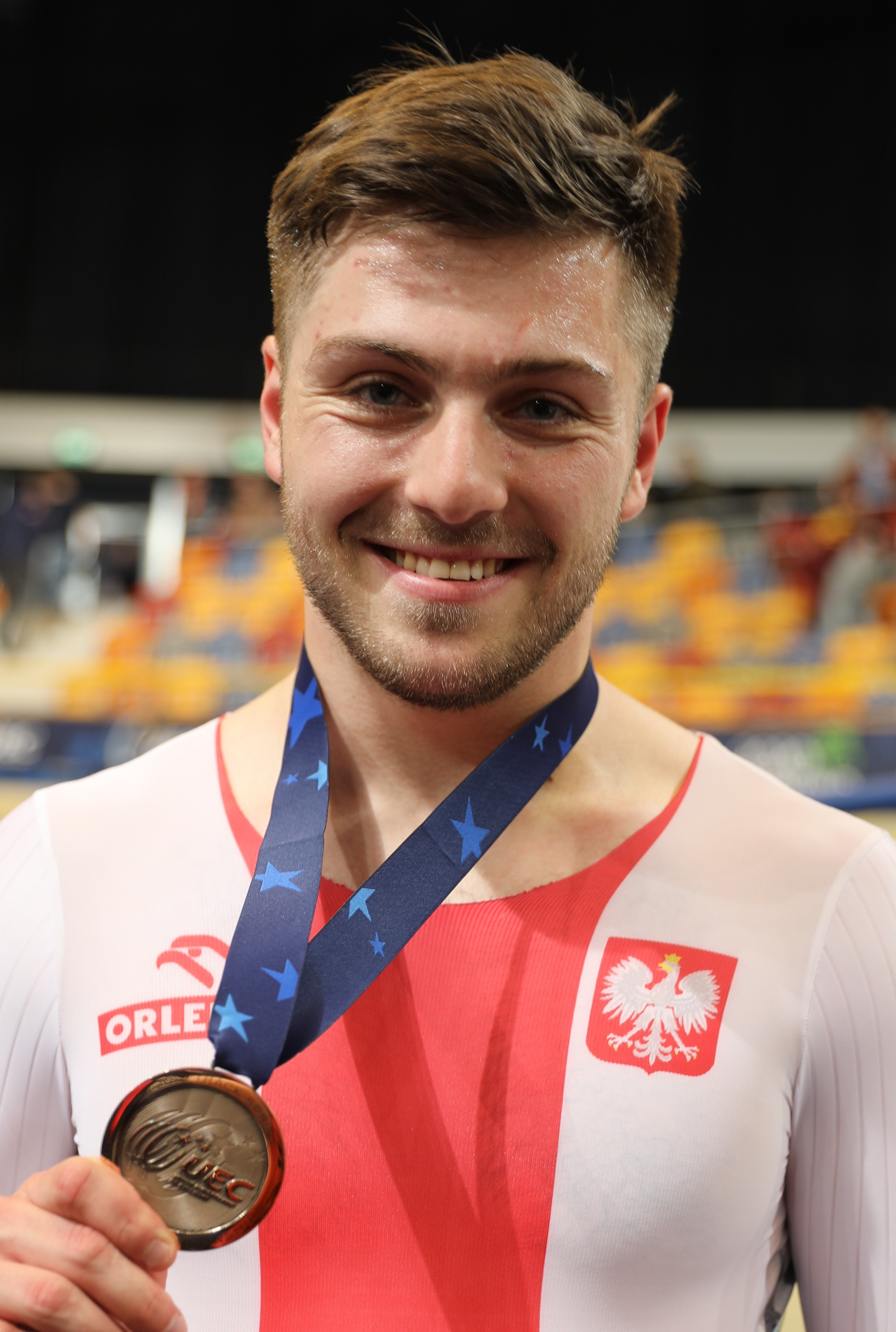
- Mateusz Rudyk in 2019

Personal information
- Born: 20 July 1995 (age 31) Oława, Poland
- Height: 1.76 m (5 ft 9 in)
- Weight: 86 kg (190 lb)

Cycling career
- Sport: Cycling
- Discipline: Track
- Role: Rider
- Rider type: Sprinter
Medal record
Men's track cycling
Representing Poland
World Championships
Bronze medal – third place	2019 Pruszków	Sprint
European Championships
Gold medal – first place	2016 Yvelines	Team sprint
Silver medal – second place	2023 Grenchen	Sprint
Silver medal – second place	2024 Apeldoorn	Sprint
Silver medal – second place	2024 Apeldoorn	Keirin
Bronze medal – third place	2019 Apeldoorn	Sprint
Bronze medal – third place	2024 Apeldoorn	Team sprint

Mateusz Rudyk (born 20 July 1995 in Oława) is a Polish track cyclist, who competes in sprinting events. He won the gold medal at the 2016 UEC European Track Championships in the team sprint. He competed at the 2024 Paris Olympics in the Men's keirin, being eliminated in the semifinals.

== See also ==
- List of European Championship medalists in men's sprint
- List of Track Cycling Nations Cup medalists
