= Martin Čechman =

Czech cyclist (born 1998)

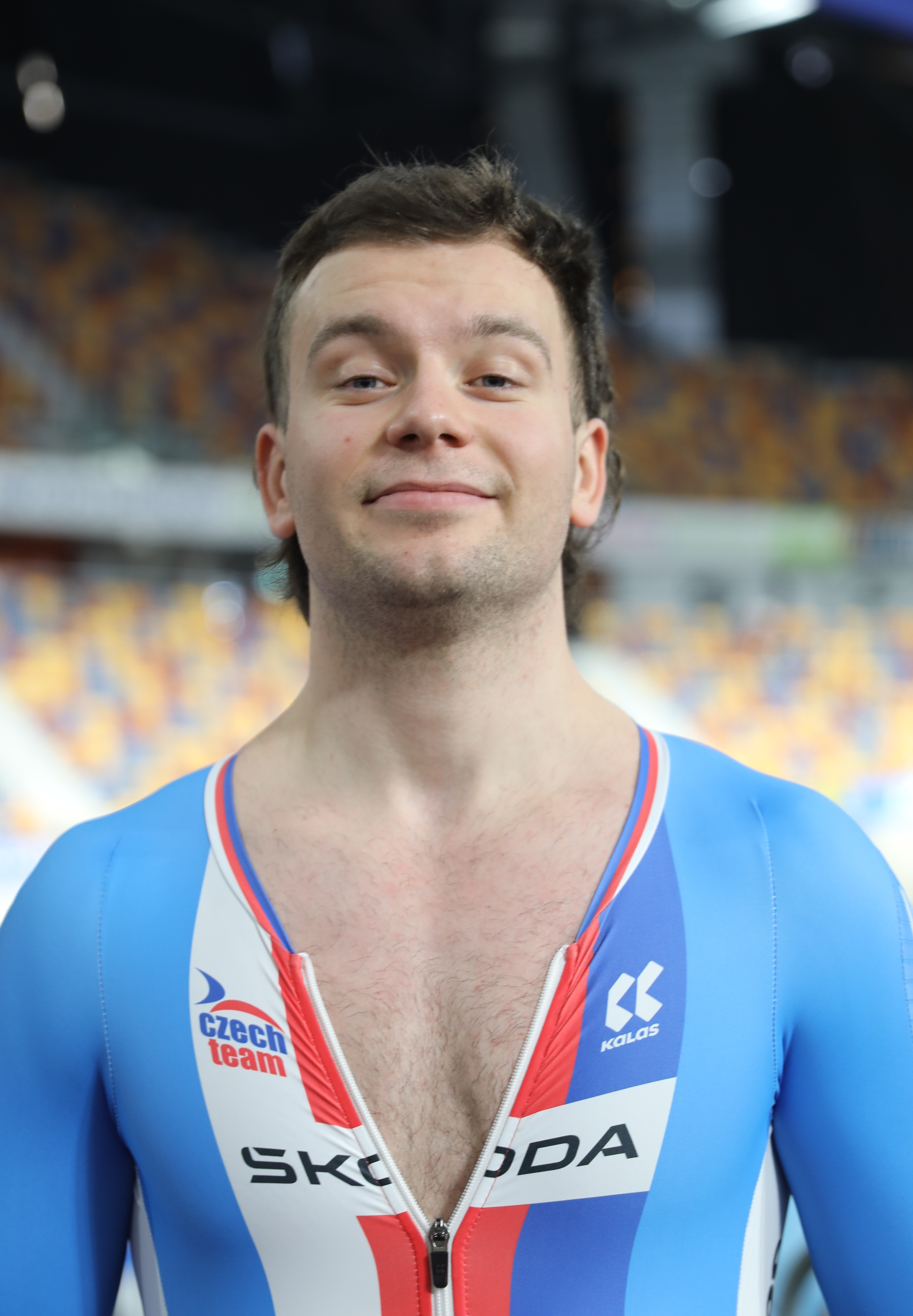
- Čechman in 2024

Personal information
- Born: 20 October 1998 (age 27)

Cycling career
- Sport: Cycling
- Role: Rider
Medal record
Men's track cycling
Representing Czech Republic
European Championships
Silver medal – second place	2020 Plovdiv	Team sprint
Junior World Championships
Silver medal – second place	2016 Aigle	Keirin
U23 & Junior European Championships
Gold medal – first place	2016 Montichiari	Junior Sprint
Gold medal – first place	2016 Montichiari	Junior Keirin
Gold medal – first place	2020 Fiorenzuola	U23 Sprint
Silver medal – second place	2020 Fiorenzuola	U23 Team sprint
Bronze medal – third place	2018 Aigle	U23 Sprint
Bronze medal – third place	2018 Aigle	U23 Keirin

Martin Čechman (born 20 October 1998) is a Czech racing cyclist. He rode in the men's sprint event at the 2018 UCI Track Cycling World Championships.
