= Track cycling at the 2026 Commonwealth Games – Men's sprint =

Cycling Track – Men's sprint at the 2026 Commonwealth Games
- Venue: Sir Chris Hoy Velodrome
- Dates: 1 August

Medalists
gold medal	Leigh Hoffman	Australia
silver medal	Nicholas Paul	Trinidad and Tobago
bronze medal	Tayte Ryan	Australia

The men's sprint at the 2026 Commonwealth Games was part of the cycling programme, and took place on 1 August 2026.

== Records ==
Prior to this competition, the existing world and Games records were as follows:

World record	(United Kingdom) Matthew Richardson	8.857	Konya Velodrome, Konya	15 August 2025
Games record	(Trinidad and Tobago) Nicholas Paul	9.445	Lee Valley VeloPark, London	31 July 2022

== Schedule ==
The schedule was as follows:

All times are British Summer Time (UTC+1)

Date	Time	Round
Saturday 1 August 2026	10:00	Qualifying
Saturday 1 August 2026	10:57	1/8 finals
Saturday 1 August 2026	11:33	Quarterfinals
Saturday 1 August 2026	15:08	Semifinals
Saturday 1 August 2026	17:32	Finals

== Results ==
=== Qualifying ===
The top 16 riders qualified for the 1/8 finals.

Rank	Riders	Time	Behind	Notes
1	Leigh Hoffman (AUS)	9.361	—	Q, GR
2	Nicholas Paul (TTO)	9.603	+0.242	Q
3	Njisane Phillip (TTO)	9.630	+0.269	Q
4	Hamish Turnbull (ENG)	9.639	+0.278	Q
5	Tayte Ryan (AUS)	9.641	+0.280	Q
6	Harry Ledingham-Horn (ENG)	9.646	+0.285	Q
7	Daniel Barber (AUS)	9.672	+0.311	Q
8	Joseph Truman (ENG)	9.678	+0.317	Q
9	Azizulhasni Awang (MAS)	9.715	+0.354	Q
10	Shah Firdaus Sahrom (MAS)	9.805	+0.444	Q
11	Ioan Hepburn (WAL)	9.807	+0.446	Q
12	Lyall Craig (SCO)	9.839	+0.478	Q
13	Tyler Rorke (CAN)	9.874	+0.513	Q
14	Peter Mitchell (SCO)	9.892	+0.531	Q
15	Steffan Lloyd (WAL)	9.950	+0.589	Q
16	Cole Dempster (CAN)	9.988	+0.627	Q
17	James Hedgcock (CAN)	10.008	+0.647	
18	Mitchell Sparrow (RSA)	10.060	+0.699	
19	Jonah Jenkins (WAL)	10.107	+0.746	
20	Sam Dakin (NZL)	10.204	+0.843	
21	Zion Pulido (TTO)	10.252	+0.891	
22	Rojit Yanglem (IND)	10.297	+0.936	
23	Niall Monks (SCO)	10.302	+0.941	
24	Ronaldo Laitonjam (IND)	10.331	+0.970	
25	David Elkatohchoongo (IND)	10.488	+1.127	
26	Atiba Quildan (ANT)	11.310	+1.949	
27	Ibrahim Jalloh (SLE)	12.963	+3.602	
28	Mustapha Koroma (SLE)	13.379	+4.018	
29	Farrakhan Mohammed (GHA)	14.647	+5.286	

=== 1/8 finals ===
Heat winners advanced to the quarterfinals.

Heat	Rank	Riders	Gap	Notes
1	1	Leigh Hoffman (AUS)	—	Q
1	2	Cole Dempster (CAN)	+0.057	
2	1	Nicholas Paul (TTO)	—	Q
2	2	Steffan Lloyd (WAL)	+0.093	
3	1	Njisane Phillip (TTO)	—	Q
3	2	Peter Mitchell (SCO)	+0.261	
4	1	Tyler Rorke (CAN)	—	Q
4	2	Hamish Turnbull (ENG)	+0.042	
5	1	Tayte Ryan (AUS)	—	Q
5	2	Lyall Craig (SCO)	+0.057	
6	1	Harry Ledingham-Horn (ENG)	—	Q
6	2	Ioan Hepburn (WAL)	+0.040	
7	1	Daniel Barber (AUS)	—	Q
7	2	Shah Firdaus Sahrom (MAS)	+0.094	
8	1	Azizulhasni Awang (MAS)	—	Q
8	2	Joseph Truman (ENG)	+0.073	

=== Quarterfinals ===
Matches were extended to a best-of-three format hereon; winners proceeded to the semifinals.

Heat	Rank	Riders	Race 1	Race 2	Decider (i.r.)	Notes
1	1	Leigh Hoffman (AUS)	X	X		Q
1	2	Azizulhasni Awang (MAS)	+1.672	+0.096		
2	1	Nicholas Paul (TTO)	X	X		Q
2	2	Daniel Barber (AUS)	+0.825	+0.065		
3	1	Harry Ledingham-Horn (ENG)	Relegated	X	X	Q
3	2	Njisane Phillip (TTO)	X	+0.004	0.067	
4	1	Tayte Ryan (AUS)	X	X		Q
4	2	Tyler Rorke (CAN)	+0.150	+0.087		

=== Semifinals ===
Winners proceeded to the gold medal final; losers proceeded to the bronze medal final.

Heat	Rank	Riders	Race 1	Race 2	Decider (i.r.)	Notes
1	1	Leigh Hoffman (AUS)	X	X		QG
1	2	Tayte Ryan (AUS)	+0.465	+1.080		QB
2	1	Nicholas Paul (TTO)	X	+0.071	X	QG
2	2	Harry Ledingham-Horn (ENG)	+0.093	X	+0.126	QB

=== Finals ===
The final classification was determined in the medal finals.

Rank	Riders	Race 1	Race 2	Decider (i.r.)
Gold medal final
1st place, gold medalist(s)	Leigh Hoffman (AUS)	X	X	
2nd place, silver medalist(s)	Nicholas Paul (TTO)	+0.206	+0.091	
Bronze medal final
3rd place, bronze medalist(s)	Tayte Ryan (AUS)	X	X	
4	Harry Ledingham-Horn (ENG)	+3.989	+0.350	
