= List of Oceanian records in track cycling =

Oceanian records in the sport of track cycling are ratified by the Oceania Cycling Confederation (OCC).

== Men ==
Key to tables: Record not kept by OCC

Event	Record	Athlete	Nationality	Date	Meet	Place	Ref
Flying 200 m time trial	9.091	Matthew Richardson	Australia	7 August 2024	Olympic Games	Saint-Quentin-en-Yvelines, France	
250 m time trial (standing start)	16.886	Leigh Hoffman	Australia	6 August 2024	Olympic Games	Saint-Quentin-en-Yvelines, France	
Team sprint	41.597	Matthew Glaetzer; Leigh Hoffman; Matthew Richardson	Australia	6 August 2024	Olympic Games	Saint-Quentin-en-Yvelines, France	
1 km time trial	58.526	Matthew Glaetzer	Australia	8 August 2023	World Championships	Glasgow, United Kingdom	
1 km time trial (sea level)	58.526	Matthew Glaetzer	Australia	8 August 2023	World Championships	Glasgow, United Kingdom	
4000m individual pursuit	4:05.944	James Moriarty	Australia	24 October 2025	World Championships	Santiago, Chile	
4000m individual pursuit	4:03.898	Oliver Bleddyn	Australia	31 July 2026	Commonwealth Games	Glasgow, United Kingdom	
4000m team pursuit	3:40.730	Oliver Bleddyn; Sam Welsford; Conor Leahy; Kelland O'Brien	Australia	6 August 2024	Olympic Games	Saint-Quentin-en-Yvelines, France	
Hour record	52.491 km	Rohan Dennis	Australia	8 February 2015		Grenchen, Switzerland	

== Women ==
Event	Record	Athlete	Nationality	Date	Meet	Place	Ref
Flying 200 m time trial	10.108	Ellesse Andrews	New Zealand	9 August 2024	Olympic Games	Saint-Quentin-en-Yvelines, France	
250 m time trial (standing start)	18.415	Anna Meares	Australia	4 April 2012	World Championships	Melbourne, Australia	
500 m time trial	32.836	Anna Meares	Australia	6 December 2013	World Cup	Aguascalientes, Mexico	
500 m time trial (sea level)	32.911	Kristina Clonan	Australia	14 May 2022	Nations Cup	Milton, Canada	
1 km time trial	1:04.625	Ellesse Andrews	New Zealand	26 February 2025	New Zealand Championships	Invercargill, New Zealand	
1 km time trial	1:04.523	Ellesse Andrews	New Zealand	25 October 2025	World Championships	Santiago, Chile	
Team sprint (500 m)	32.255	Kaarle McCulloch; Stephanie Morton	Australia	27 February 2019	World Championships	Pruszków, Poland	
Team sprint (750 m)	45.348	Rebecca Petch; Shaane Fulton; Ellesse Andrews	New Zealand	5 August 2024	Olympic Games	Saint-Quentin-en-Yvelines, France	
3000m individual pursuit	3:18.456	Bryony Botha	New Zealand	30 July 2022	Commonwealth Games	London, Great Britain	
4000m individual pursuit	4:30.752	Bryony Botha	New Zealand	12 February 2025	Oceania Championships	Brisbane, Australia	
4000m individual pursuit	4:29.111	Bryony Botha	New Zealand	11 February 2026	Oceania Championships	Cambridge, New Zealand	
3000m team pursuit	3:16.935	Annette Edmondson; Melissa Hoskins; Josephine Tomic	Australia	4 August 2012	Olympic Games	London, Great Britain	
4000m team pursuit	4:04.679	Ally Wollaston; Bryony Botha; Emily Shearman; Nicole Shields	New Zealand	6 August 2024	Olympic Games	Saint-Quentin-en-Yvelines, France	
Hour record	47.791 km	Jaime Nielsen	New Zealand	21 July 2017		Cambridge, New Zealand	
