= 2025 UCI Track Cycling World Championships – Men's keirin =

Men's keirin at the 2025 UCI Track Cycling World Championships
- Venue: Velódromo Peñalolén
- Location: Santiago, Chile
- Dates: 23 October
- Competitors: 36 from 22 nations

Medalists
gold medal	Harrie Lavreysen	Netherlands
silver medal	Leigh Hoffman	Australia
bronze medal	Jeffrey Hoogland	Netherlands

The Men's keirin competition at the 2025 UCI Track Cycling World Championships was held on 23 October 2025.

== Results ==
=== First round ===
The first round was started at 11:00. The first two riders from each heat qualified for the quarterfinals, all other riders moved to the repechages.

Heat 1

Rank	Name	Nation	Gap	Notes
1	Jeffrey Hoogland	Netherlands		Q
2	Daniel Barber	Australia	+0.064	Q
3	Bohdan Danylchuk	Ukraine	+0.147	
4	Vasilijus Lendel	Lithuania	+0.595	
5	Camilo Palacios	Chile	+0.998	
6	Kento Yamasaki	Japan	+1.298	

Heat 3

Rank	Name	Nation	Gap	Notes
1	Harry Ledingham-Horn	Great Britain		Q
2	Mateusz Rudyk	Poland	+0.094	Q
3	Lucas Vilar	Argentina	+0.166	
4	Nick Wammes	Canada	+0.393	
5	Santiago Ramírez	Colombia	+0.652	
6	Tom Derache	France	+2.283	

Heat 5

Rank	Name	Nation	Gap	Notes
1	Nicholas Paul	Trinidad and Tobago		Q
2	Matthew Richardson	Great Britain	+0.295	Q
3	Shinji Nakano	Japan	+0.412	
4	Maximilian Dörnbach	Germany	+0.427	
5	Tijmen van Loon	Netherlands	+0.556	
6	Laurynas Vinskas	Lithuania	+0.857	

Heat 2

Rank	Name	Nation	Gap	Notes
1	Kaiya Ota	Japan		Q
2	Sam Dakin	New Zealand	+0.167	Q
3	Harrie Lavreysen	Netherlands	+0.204	
4	Choi Tae-ho	South Korea	+0.324	
5	Martin Čechman	Czech Republic	+0.328	
6	Lowie Nulens	Belgium	+0.378	

Heat 4

Rank	Name	Nation	Gap	Notes
1	Kevin Quintero	Colombia		Q
2	Leigh Hoffman	Australia	+0.001	Q
3	Luca Spiegel	Germany	+0.097	
4	Ryan Dodyk	Canada	+0.668	
5	Njisane Phillip	Trinidad and Tobago	+0.944	
6	Mahmoud Elimbabi	Egypt	+2.712	

Heat 6

Rank	Name	Nation	Gap	Notes
1	Mikhail Iakovlev	Israel		Q
2	Nikita Kiriltsev	Individual Neutral Athletes	+0.233	Q
3	Cristian Ortega	Colombia	+0.352	
4	Stefano Moro	Italy	+0.478	
5	Minato Nakaishi	Japan	+0.734	
6	Sébastien Vigier	France	+1.073	

=== First round repechage ===
The first round repechage was started at 12:15. The first rider from each heat qualified for the quarterfinals.

Heat 1

Rank	Name	Nation	Gap	Notes
1	Bohdan Danylchuk	Ukraine		Q
2	Tijmen van Loon	Netherlands	+0.065	
3	Laurynas Vinskas	Lithuania	+0.156	
4	Stefano Moro	Italy	+0.573	

Heat 3

Rank	Name	Nation	Gap	Notes
1	Sébastien Vigier	France		Q
2	Lucas Vilar	Argentina	+0.034	
3	Choi Tae-ho	South Korea	+0.112	
4	Camilo Palacios	Chile	+0.165	

Heat 5

Rank	Name	Nation	Gap	Notes
1	Shinji Nakano	Japan		Q
2	Ryan Dodyk	Canada	+0.689	
3	Lowie Nulens	Belgium	+0.725	
4	Santiago Ramírez	Colombia	+0.724	

Heat 2

Rank	Name	Nation	Gap	Notes
1	Harrie Lavreysen	Netherlands		Q
2	Vasilijus Lendel	Lithuania	+0.065	
3	Minato Nakaishi	Japan	+0.091	
4	Mahmoud Elimbabi	Egypt	+1.735	

Heat 4

Rank	Name	Nation	Gap	Notes
1	Martin Čechman	Czech Republic		Q
2	Nick Wammes	Canada	+0.039	
3	Kento Yamasaki	Japan	+0.069	
4	Luca Spiegel	Germany	+0.294	

Heat 6

Rank	Name	Nation	Gap	Notes
1	Tom Derache	France		Q
2	Maximilian Dörnbach	Germany	+0.022	
3	Njisane Phillip	Trinidad and Tobago	+0.123	
4	Cristian Ortega	Colombia	+0.142	

=== Quarterfinals ===
The quarterfinals were started at 13:20. The first four riders from each heat qualified for the semifinals.

Heat 1

Rank	Name	Nation	Gap	Notes
1	Nikita Kiriltsev	Individual Neutral Athletes		Q
2	Kevin Quintero	Colombia	+0.107	Q
3	Jeffrey Hoogland	Netherlands	+0.151	Q
4	Mateusz Rudyk	Poland	+0.360	Q
5	Sébastien Vigier	France	+1.722	
6	Shinji Nakano	Japan	Relegated	

Heat 3

Rank	Name	Nation	Gap	Notes
1	Mikhail Iakovlev	Israel		Q
2	Sam Dakin	New Zealand	+0.650	Q
3	Leigh Hoffman	Australia	+0.672	Q
4	Bohdan Danylchuk	Ukraine	+0.792	Q
5	Harry Ledingham-Horn	Great Britain	+0.893	
6	Martin Čechman	Czech Republic	+2.560	

Heat 2

Rank	Name	Nation	Gap	Notes
1	Kaiya Ota	Japan		Q
2	Nicholas Paul	Trinidad and Tobago	+0.108	Q
3	Harrie Lavreysen	Netherlands	+0.259	Q
4	Tom Derache	France	+0.309	Q
5	Daniel Barber	Australia	+0.500	
6	Matthew Richardson	Great Britain	+0.557	

=== Semifinals ===
The semifinals were started at 18:14. The first three riders in each heat qualify for the final, all other riders race for places 7 to 12.

Heat 1

Rank	Name	Nation	Gap	Notes
1	Harrie Lavreysen	Netherlands		Q
2	Kevin Quintero	Colombia	+0.068	Q
3	Leigh Hoffman	Australia	+0.069	Q
4	Bohdan Danylchuk	Ukraine	+0.172	
5	Nicholas Paul	Trinidad and Tobago	+0.302	
6	Nikita Kiriltsev	Individual Neutral Athletes	Did not finish	

Heat 2

Rank	Name	Nation	Gap	Notes
1	Mikhail Iakovlev	Israel		Q
2	Jeffrey Hoogland	Netherlands	+0.027	Q
3	Kaiya Ota	Japan	+0.033	Q
4	Tom Derache	France	+0.302	
5	Sam Dakin	New Zealand	+0.316	
6	Mateusz Rudyk	Poland	+1.057	

=== Finals ===
The finals were started at 19:43.

==== Small final ====
Rank	Name	Nation	Gap	Notes
7	Nicholas Paul	Trinidad and Tobago		
8	Bohdan Danylchuk	Ukraine	+0.058	
9	Tom Derache	France	+0.086	
10	Sam Dakin	New Zealand	+0.208	
11	Mateusz Rudyk	Poland	+0.512	
12	Nikita Kiriltsev	Individual Neutral Athletes	Did not start	

==== Final ====
Rank	Name	Nation	Gap	Notes
1st place, gold medalist(s)	Harrie Lavreysen	Netherlands		
2nd place, silver medalist(s)	Leigh Hoffman	Australia	+0.107	
3rd place, bronze medalist(s)	Jeffrey Hoogland	Netherlands	+0.187	
4	Kaiya Ota	Japan	+0.207	
5	Mikhail Iakovlev	Israel	+1.449	
6	Kevin Quintero	Colombia	Did not finish	
