= 2025 UCI Track Cycling World Championships – Men's sprint =

Men's sprint at the 2025 UCI Track Cycling World Championships
- Venue: Velódromo Peñalolén
- Location: Santiago, Chile
- Dates: 25–26 October
- Competitors: 34 from 21 nations

Medalists
gold medal	Harrie Lavreysen	Netherlands
silver medal	Matthew Richardson	Great Britain
bronze medal	Leigh Hoffman	Australia

The Men's sprint competition at the 2025 UCI Track Cycling World Championships was held on 25 and 26 October 2025.

== Results ==
=== Qualifying ===
The qualifying was started on 23 October at 11:36.

Rank	Name	Nation	Time	Behind	Notes
1	Matthew Richardson	Great Britain	9.210		Q
2	Harrie Lavreysen	Netherlands	9.306	+0.096	Q
3	Mikhail Iakovlev	Israel	9.368	+0.158	Q
4	Leigh Hoffman	Australia	9.410	+0.200	Q
5	Jeffrey Hoogland	Netherlands	9.418	+0.208	Q
6	Nicholas Paul	Trinidad and Tobago	9.475	+0.265	Q
7	Rayan Helal	France	9.529	+0.319	Q
8	Kaiya Ota	Japan	9.560	+0.350	Q
9	Daniel Barber	Australia	9.584	+0.374	Q
10	Mateusz Rudyk	Poland	9.620	+0.410	Q
11	Cristian Ortega	Colombia	9.626	+0.416	Q
12	Henric Hackmann	Germany	9.641	+0.431	Q
13	Tom Derache	France	9.667	+0.457	Q
14	Tijmen van Loon	Netherlands	9.684	+0.474	Q
15	Njisane Phillip	Trinidad and Tobago	9.711	+0.501	Q
16	Luca Spiegel	Germany	9.714	+0.504	Q
17	Nick Wammes	Canada	9.747	+0.537	Q
18	Hamish Turnbull	Great Britain	9.752	+0.542	Q
19	Lucas Vilar	Argentina	9.754	+0.544	Q
20	Choi Tae-ho	South Korea	9.756	+0.546	Q
21	Minato Nakaishi	Japan	9.786	+0.576	Q
22	Kevin Quintero	Colombia	9.818	+0.608	Q
23	James Hedgcock	Canada	9.820	+0.610	Q
24	Vasilijus Lendel	Lithuania	9.825	+0.615	Q
25	Lowie Nulens	Belgium	9.836	+0.626	Q
26	Martin Čechman	Czech Republic	9.848	+0.638	Q
27	Sam Dakin	New Zealand	9.897	+0.687	Q
28	Stefano Moro	Italy	9.914	+0.704	Q
29	Ryan Elliott	Australia	9.915	+0.705	
30	Bohdan Danylchuk	Ukraine	9.917	+0.707	
31	Shinji Nakano	Japan	9.946	+0.736	
32	Laurynas Vinskas	Lithuania	10.083	+0.873	
33	Camilo Palacios	Chile	10.735	+1.525	
—	Nikita Kiriltsev	Individual Neutral Athletes	Did not start		

=== 1/16 finals ===
The 1/16 finals were started on 23 October at 12:40.

Heat	Rank	Name	Nation	Gap	Notes
1	1	Jeffrey Hoogland	Netherlands		Q
1	2	Stefano Moro	Italy	+0.854	
2	1	Nicholas Paul	Trinidad and Tobago		Q
2	2	Sam Dakin	New Zealand	+0.797	
3	1	Rayan Helal	France		Q
3	2	Martin Čechman	Czech Republic	+0.366	
4	1	Kaiya Ota	Japan		Q
4	2	Lowie Nulens	Belgium	+0.537	
5	1	Daniel Barber	Australia		Q
5	2	Vasilijus Lendel	Lithuania	+0.035	
6	1	Mateusz Rudyk	Poland		Q
6	2	James Hedgcock	Canada	+0.093	
7	1	Cristian Ortega	Colombia		Q
7	2	Kevin Quintero	Colombia	+0.000	
8	1	Henric Hackmann	Germany		Q
8	2	Minato Nakaishi	Japan	+0.116	
9	1	Tom Derache	France		Q
9	2	Choi Tae-ho	South Korea	+0.074	
10	1	Tijmen van Loon	Netherlands		Q
10	2	Lucas Vilar	Argentina	+0.053	
11	1	Hamish Turnbull	Great Britain		Q
11	2	Njisane Phillip	Trinidad and Tobago	+0.108	
12	1	Nick Wammes	Canada		Q
12	2	Luca Spiegel	Germany	+0.037	

=== 1/8 finals ===
The 1/8 finals were started on 25 October at 14:47.

Heat	Rank	Name	Nation	Gap	Notes
1	1	Matthew Richardson	Great Britain		Q
1	2	Nick Wammes	Canada	+0.659	
2	1	Harrie Lavreysen	Netherlands		Q
2	2	Hamish Turnbull	Great Britain	+0.090	
3	1	Mikhail Iakovlev	Israel		Q
3	2	Tijmen van Loon	Netherlands	+0.815	
4	1	Leigh Hoffman	Australia		Q
4	2	Tom Derache	France	+0.037	
5	1	Jeffrey Hoogland	Netherlands		Q
5	2	Henric Hackmann	Germany	+0.028	
6	1	Nicholas Paul	Trinidad and Tobago		Q
6	2	Cristian Ortega	Colombia	+0.134	
7	1	Rayan Helal	France		Q
7	2	Mateusz Rudyk	Poland	+0.051	
8	1	Kaiya Ota	Japan		Q
8	2	Daniel Barber	Australia	+0.026	

=== Quarterfinals ===
The quarterfinals were started on 25 October at 14:47.

Heat	Rank	Name	Nation	Race 1	Race 2	Decider (i.r.)	Notes
1	1	Matthew Richardson	Great Britain	X	X		Q
1	2	Kaiya Ota	Japan	+0.556	+0.017		
2	1	Harrie Lavreysen	Netherlands	X	X		Q
2	2	Rayan Helal	France	+0.134	+0.160		
3	1	Nicholas Paul	Trinidad and Tobago	X	X		Q
3	2	Mikhail Iakovlev	Israel	+0.277	+0.030		
4	1	Leigh Hoffman	Australia	X	X		Q
4	2	Jeffrey Hoogland	Netherlands	+0.007	+0.018		

=== Semifinals ===
The semifinals were started on 26 October at 11:00.

Heat	Rank	Name	Nation	Race 1	Race 2	Decider (i.r.)	Notes
1	1	Matthew Richardson	Great Britain	X	X		Q
1	2	Leigh Hoffman	Australia	+0.271	+0.103		
2	1	Harrie Lavreysen	Netherlands	X	X		Q
2	2	Nicholas Paul	Trinidad and Tobago	+0.511	+0.355		

=== Finals ===
The finals were started on 26 October at 13:44.

Rank	Name	Nation	Race 1	Race 2	Decider (i.r.)
Gold medal race
1st place, gold medalist(s)	Harrie Lavreysen	Netherlands	X	X	
2nd place, silver medalist(s)	Matthew Richardson	Great Britain	+0.094	+0.050	
Bronze medal race
3rd place, bronze medalist(s)	Leigh Hoffman	Australia	X	X	
4	Nicholas Paul	Trinidad and Tobago	+0.356	+0.721	
