= List of British records in track cycling =

The following are the national records in track cycling in Great Britain maintained by Great Britain's national cycling federation: British Cycling.

== Men ==
Key to tables: Awaiting ratification Record not kept by federation Not ratified or later rescinded by British Cycling

Event	Record	Athlete	Date	Meet	Place	Ref
Flying 200 m time trial	8.857 WR	Matthew Richardson	15 August 2025		Konya, Turkey	
250 m time trial (standing start)	17.005	Ryan Owens	1 November 2019	World Cup	Minsk, Belarus	
Flying 500 m time trial	24.758	Chris Hoy	13 May 2007		La Paz, Bolivia	
500 m time trial	31.041	Chris Hoy	12 May 2007		La Paz, Bolivia	
Team sprint	41.788	Harry Ledingham-Horn; Harry Radford; Matthew Richardson	14 March 2025	Nations Cup	Konya, Turkey	
Flying 1 km time trial	57.412	Jonathan Wale	26 August 2017		Derby, United Kingdom	
1 km time trial	57.541	Joseph Truman	2 February 2026	European Championships	Konya, Turkey	
1 km time trial (sea level)	58.667	Joseph Truman	18 October 2024	World Championships	Ballerup, Denmark	
1 km madison time trial	53.553	Ed Clancy; Jon Mould	6 January 2018	Revolution Series	Manchester, United Kingdom	
4000 m individual pursuit	3:59.304	Josh Charlton	18 October 2024	World Championships	Ballerup, Denmark	
4000 m team pursuit	3:42.151	Ethan Hayter; Oliver Wood; Charlie Tanfield; Ethan Vernon	6 August 2024	Olympic Games	Saint-Quentin-en-Yvelines, France	
Hour record	55.548 km	Daniel Bigham	19 August 2022		Grenchen, Switzerland	
Hour record (UCI best human effort)	56.375 km	Chris Boardman	7 September 1996		Manchester, United Kingdom	

== Women ==
Event	Record	Athlete	Date	Meet	Place	Ref
Flying 200 m time trial	9.759 WR	Emma Finucane	2 February 2026	European Championships	Konya, Turkey	
250 m time trial (standing start)	18.599	Rhianna Parris-Smith (Note: by official start schedule and video sources; Sophie Capewell by official result source, probably a typo)	1 February 2026	European Championships	Konya, Turkey	
Flying 500 m time trial	30.61	Victoria Pendleton	27 August 2002		Manchester, United Kingdom	
500 m time trial	33.042	Sophie Capewell	4 August 2023	World Championships	Glasgow, United Kingdom	
500 m time trial (sea level)	33.042	Sophie Capewell	4 August 2023	World Championships	Glasgow, United Kingdom	
Flying 1 km time trial	1:06.060	Charlotte Parnham	17 February 2018		Derby, United Kingdom	
1 km time trial	1:09.770	Amy Cole	12 January 2024		Newport, United Kingdom	
1 km time trial	1:07.179	Neah Evans	15 February 2025	European Championships	Heusden-Zolder, Belgium	
1 km time trial	1:06.048	Rhian Edmunds	25 October 2025	World Championships	Santiago, Chile	
1 km time trial	1:03.681	Sophie Capewell	4 February 2026	European Championships	Konya, Turkey	
Team sprint (500 m)	32.400 (Note: by official result source; 32.153 by British Cycling source, a typo (Germany's mark))	Becky James; Jess Varnish	5 December 2013	World Cup	Aguascalientes, Mexico	
Team sprint (750 m)	45.186 WR	Katy Marchant; Emma Finucane; Sophie Capewell	5 August 2024	Olympic Games	Saint-Quentin-en-Yvelines, France	
3000m individual pursuit	3:16.560	Anna Morris	19 October 2024 (Note: by official result source; 15 October 2022 by British Cycling, a typo)	World Championships	Ballerup, Denmark	
4000m individual pursuit	4:19.461 WR	Josie Knight	4 February 2026	European Championships	Konya, Turkey	
3000m team pursuit	3:14.051	Dani King; Joanna Rowsell; Laura Trott	4 August 2012	Olympic Games	London, Great Britain	
4000m team pursuit	4:02.808 WR	Katie Archibald; Josie Knight; Anna Morris; Millie Couzens	2 February 2026	European Championships	Konya, Turkey	
Hour record	48.405 km	Joss Lowden	30 September 2021		Grenchen, Switzerland	
Hour record (UCI best human effort)	47.608 km	Yvonne McGregor	18 June 1997		Manchester, United Kingdom	
