= 2025 UCI Track Cycling World Championships – Men's team sprint =

Men's team sprint at the 2025 UCI Track Cycling World Championships
- Venue: Peñalolén Velodrome
- Location: Santiago, Chile
- Dates: 22 October
- Competitors: 49 from 15 nations
- Teams: 15
- Winning time: 41.691

Medalists
gold medal	Jeffrey Hoogland; Harrie Lavreysen; Roy van den Berg	Netherlands
silver medal	Matthew Richardson; Joseph Truman; Hamish Turnbull; Harry Ledingham-Horn	Great Britain
bronze medal	Daniel Barber; Ryan Elliott; Leigh Hoffman	Australia

The Men's team sprint competition at the 2025 UCI Track Cycling World Championships was held on 22 October 2025.

== Results ==
=== Qualifying ===
The qualifying was started at 14:54. The eight fastest teams advanced to the first round.

Rank	Nation	Time	Behind	Notes
1	Netherlands; Roy van den Berg; Harrie Lavreysen; Jeffrey Hoogland	41.860		Q
2	Great Britain; Joseph Truman; Matthew Richardson; Harry Ledingham-Horn	42.131	+0.271	Q
3	Australia; Ryan Elliott; Leigh Hoffman; Daniel Barber	42.691	+0.831	Q
4	France; Florian Grengbo; Rayan Helal; Tom Derache	42.743	+0.883	Q
5	Czech Republic; Matěj Tamme; Dominik Topinka; David Peterka	42.977	+1.117	Q
6	Japan; Yoshitaku Nagasako; Kaiya Ota; Yuta Obara	42.991	+1.131	Q
7	Germany; Nik Schröter; Luca Spiegel; Maximilian Dörnbach	43.175	+1.315	Q
8	Italy; Daniele Napolitano; Stefano Minuta; Mattia Predomo	43.234	+1.374	Q
9	Spain; Alejandro Martínez; Esteban Sánchez; José Moreno	44.316	+1.599	
10	Canada; Ryan Dodyk; Tyler Rorke; James Hedgcock	43.459	+1.953	
11	Colombia; Rubén Murillo; Kevin Quintero; Santiago Ramírez	43.813	+2.456	
12	Mexico; Ridley Malo; Jafet López; Edgar Verdugo	44.435	+2.575	
13	Kazakhstan; Daniyar Shayakhmetov; Kirill Kurdidi; Ramazan Mukhtar	44.803	+2.943	
14	Lithuania; Nedas Narbutas; Laurynas Vinskas; Eimantas Vadapalas	45.859	+3.999	
—	Chile; Nicolás Vergara; Camilo Palacios; Roberto Castillo	Did not finish		

=== First round ===
The first round was started at 18:44.

First round heats were held as follows:
Heat 1: 4th v 5th fastest
Heat 2: 3rd v 6th fastest
Heat 3: 2nd v 7th fastest
Heat 4: 1st v 8th fastest

The heat winners were ranked on time, from which the top two advanced to the gold medal race and the other two proceeded to the bronze medal race.

Rank	Heat	Nation	Time	Notes
1	1	France; Florian Grengbo; Rayan Helal; Sébastien Vigier	42.581	QB
2	1	Czech Republic; Dominik Topinka; David Peterka; Matěj Tamme	42.845	
1	2	Australia; Daniel Barber; Ryan Elliott; Leigh Hoffman	42.261	QB
2	2	Japan; Yoshitaku Nagasako; Yuta Obara; Kaiya Ota	42.714	
1	3	Great Britain; Harry Ledingham-Horn; Matthew Richardson; Joseph Truman	41.850	QG
2	3	Germany; Maximilian Dörnbach; Henric Hackmann; Luca Spiegel	43.004	
1	4	Netherlands; Jeffrey Hoogland; Harrie Lavreysen; Roy van den Berg	41.634	QG
2	4	Italy; Stefano Minuta; Mattia Predomo; Matteo Bianchi	42.847	

=== Finals ===
The final was started at 20:06.

Rank	Nation	Time	Behind	Notes
Gold medal race
1st place, gold medalist(s)	Netherlands; Jeffrey Hoogland; Harrie Lavreysen; Roy van den Berg	41.691		
2nd place, silver medalist(s)	Great Britain; Matthew Richardson; Joseph Truman; Hamish Turnbull	42.060	+0.369	
Bronze medal race
3rd place, bronze medalist(s)	Australia; Daniel Barber; Ryan Elliott; Leigh Hoffman	42.611		
4	France; Tom Derache; Florian Grengbo; Rayan Helal	42.861	+0.250	
