= Track cycling at the 2026 Commonwealth Games – Men's 1 km time trial =

Cycling Track – Men's time trial at the 2026 Commonwealth Games
- Venue: Sir Chris Hoy Velodrome
- Dates: 2 August
- Winning time: 58.530

Medalists
gold medal	Leigh Hoffman	Australia
silver medal	Joseph Truman	England
bronze medal	Tayte Ryan	Australia

The men's time trial at the 2026 Commonwealth Games was part of the cycling programme, and took place on 2 August 2026.

== Records ==
Prior to this competition, the existing world and Games records were as follows:

World record	(Netherlands) Jeffrey Hoogland	55.433	Aguascalientes Bicentenary Velodrome, Aguascalientes	31 October 2023
Games record	(Australia) Matthew Glaetzer	59.340	Anna Meares Velodrome, Brisbane	8 April 2018

== Schedule ==
The schedule is as follows:

All times are British Summer Time (UTC+1)

Date	Time	Round
Sunday 2 Augyst 2026	10:57	Finals

== Results ==
Rank	Rider	Time	Behind	Notes
1st place, gold medalist(s)	Leigh Hoffman (AUS)	58.530	—	GR
2nd place, silver medalist(s)	Joseph Truman (ENG)	59.525	+0.995	
3rd place, bronze medalist(s)	Tayte Ryan (AUS)	59.684	+1.154	
4	Harry Ledingham-Horn (ENG)	1:00.039	+1.509	
5	Thomas Cornish (AUS)	1:00.370	+1.840	
6	Steffan Lloyd (WAL)	1:00.638	+2.108	
7	Nicholas Paul (TTO)	1:00.794	+2.264	
8	Hamish Turnbull (ENG)	1:01.132	+2.602	
9	James Hedgcock (CAN)	1:01.279	+2.749	
10	Azizulhasni Awang (MAS)	1:01.357	+2.827	
11	Rhys Britton (WAL)	1:01.939	+3.409	
12	Cole Dempster (CAN)	1:02.169	+3.639	
13	Jonah Jenkins (WAL)	1:02.435	+3.905	
14	Mitchell Sparrow (RSA)	1:02.482	+3.952	
15	Sam Dakin (NZL)	1:02.589	+4.059	
16	Michael Gill (SCO)	1:02.726	+4.196	
17	Tim Shoreman (SCO)	1:03.503	+4.973	
18	Daniel Morton (NZL)	1:03.656	+5.126	
19	Niall Monks (SCO)	1:03.776	+5.246	
20	Ronaldo Laitonjam (IND)	1:04.191	+5.661	
21	Atiba Jamal Quildan (ANT)	1:07.011	+8.481	
22	Peter Karanja (KEN)	1:17.111	+18.581	
23	Charles Kagimu (UGA)	1:17.223	+18.693	
24	Farrakhan Shaaban Mohammed (GHA)	1:19.592	+21.062	
