= Track cycling at the 2026 Commonwealth Games – Men's team sprint =

Cycling Track – Men's team sprint at the 2026 Commonwealth Games
- Venue: Sir Chris Hoy Velodrome
- Dates: 30 July
- Winning time: 42.455

Medalists
gold medal	Ryan Elliott; Leigh Hoffman; Daniel Barber	Australia
silver medal	Joseph Truman; Harry Ledingham-Horn; Hamish Turnbull	England
bronze medal	Zion Pulido; Njisane Phillip; Nicholas Paul	Trinidad and Tobago

The men's team sprint at the 2026 Commonwealth Games was part of the cycling programme, and took place on 30 July 2026.

== Records ==
Prior to this competition, the existing world and Games records were as follows:

World record	Netherlands (Jeffrey Hoogland, Harrie Lavreysen, Roy van den Berg)	40.949	Saint-Quentin-en-Yvelines, France	6 August 2024
Games record	Australia (Matthew Glaetzer, Leigh Hoffman, Matthew Richardson)	42.040	Lee Valley Velodrome, London	29 July 2022

== Schedule ==
The schedule is as follows:

All times are British Summer Time (UTC+1)

Date	Time	Round
Thursday 30 July 2026	12:16	Qualifying
Thursday 30 July 2026	18:03	Finals

== Results ==
=== Qualifying ===
The two fastest teams advanced to the gold medal final. The next two fastest teams advanced to the bronze medal final.026}}</ref>

Rank	Nation	Time	Behind	Notes
1	Australia; Ryan Elliott; Leigh Hoffman; Daniel Barber	42.754		QG
2	England; Joseph Truman; Harry Ledingham-Horn; Hamish Turnbull	42.799	+0.045	QG
3	Trinidad and Tobago; Zion Pulido; Njisane Phillip; Nicholas Paul	42.817	+0.063	QB
4	Wales; Lewis Oliva; Steffan Lloyd; Ioan Hepburn	44.075	+1.321	QB
5	Canada; Cole Dempster; Tyler Rorke; James Hedgcock	44.131	+1.377	
6	Scotland; Niall Monks; Lyall Craig; Peter Mitchell	44.347	+1.593	
7	India; Rojit Singh Yanglem; David Beckham Elkatohchoongo; Ronaldo Singh Laitonjam	46.396	+3.642	

=== Finals ===
Rank	Nation	Time	Behind	Notes
Gold medal final
1st place, gold medalist(s)	Australia; Ryan Elliott; Leigh Hoffman; Daniel Barber	42.455		
2nd place, silver medalist(s)	England; Joseph Truman; Harry Ledingham-Horn; Hamish Turnbull	43.032	+0.577	
Bronze medal final
3rd place, bronze medalist(s)	Trinidad and Tobago; Zion Pulido; Njisane Phillip; Nicholas Paul	W/O		
4	Wales; Lewis Oliva; Steffan Lloyd; Ioan Hepburn			
