= 2024 UCI Track Cycling World Championships – Men's team sprint =

Men's team sprint at the 2024 UCI Track Cycling World Championships
- Venue: Ballerup Super Arena
- Location: Ballerup, Denmark
- Dates: 16 October
- Competitors: 47 from 15 nations
- Teams: 15
- Winning time: 42.046

Medalists
gold medal	Roy van den Berg; Harrie Lavreysen; Jeffrey Hoogland	Netherlands
silver medal	Ryan Elliott; Leigh Hoffman; Thomas Cornish	Australia
bronze medal	Yoshitaku Nagasako; Kaiya Ota; Yuta Obara	Japan

The Men's team sprint competition at the 2024 UCI Track Cycling World Championships was held on 16 October 2024.

== Results ==
=== Qualifying ===
The qualifying was started at 13:52. The best eight teams advanced to the first round.

Rank	Nation	Time	Behind	Notes
1	Netherlands; Roy van den Berg; Harrie Lavreysen; Jeffrey Hoogland	42.589		Q
2	Australia; Ryan Elliott; Leigh Hoffman; Thomas Cornish	42.993	+0.404	Q
3	Japan; Yoshitaku Nagasako; Kaiya Ota; Yuta Obara	42.998	+0.409	Q
4	Great Britain; Joseph Truman; Hayden Norris; Harry Ledingham-Horn	43.030	+0.441	Q
5	France; Sébastien Vigier; Rayan Helal; Melvin Landerneau	43.493	+0.904	Q
6	Colombia; Rubén Murillo; Kevin Quintero; Santiago Ramírez	43.852	+1.263	Q
7	Italy; Stefano Minuta; Mattia Predomo; Matteo Bianchi	43.906	+1.317	Q
8	Germany; Nik Schroter; Luca Spiegel; Pete-Collin Flemming	44.186	+1.597	Q
9	Canada; Tyler Rorke; Ryan Dodyk; James Hedgcock	44.203	+1.614	
10	Czech Republic; Matěj Bohuslávek; Dominik Topinka; Martin Čechman	44.245	+1.656	
11	Poland; Daniel Rochna; Konrad Burawski; Maciej Bielecki	44.488	+1.899	
12	Spain; José Moreno; Alejandro Martínez; Ekain Jiménez	44.563	+1.974	
13	Mexico; Ridley Malo; Jafet López; Edgar Verdugo	45.089	+2.500	
14	India; Rojit Singh; Esow Alben; Ronaldo Laitonjam	45.095	+2.506	
15	Ukraine; Valentyn Varharakyn; Bohdan Danylchuk; Vladyslav Denysenko	45.534	+2.945	

=== First round ===
The first round was started at 18:46.

First round heats were held as follows:
Heat 1: 4th v 5th fastest
Heat 2: 3rd v 6th fastest
Heat 3: 2nd v 7th fastest
Heat 4: 1st v 8th fastest

The heat winners were ranked on time, from which the top two advanced to the gold medal race and the other two proceeded to the bronze medal race.

Heat	Rank	Nation	Time	Notes
1	1	Great Britain; Joseph Truman; Hayden Norris; Harry Ledingham-Horn	42.888	QB
1	2	France; Sébastien Vigier; Rayan Helal; Melvin Landerneau	43.026	
2	1	Japan; Yoshitaku Nagasako; Kaiya Ota; Yuta Obara	42.744	QB
2	2	Colombia; Rubén Murillo; Kevin Quintero; Santiago Ramírez	43.389	
3	1	Australia; Ryan Elliott; Leigh Hoffman; Thomas Cornish	42.617	QG
3	2	Italy; Stefano Minuta; Mattia Predomo; Matteo Bianchi	44.042	
4	1	Netherlands; Roy van den Berg; Harrie Lavreysen; Jeffrey Hoogland	42.260	QG
4	2	Germany; Nik Schroter; Luca Spiegel; Henric Hackmann	43.714	

=== Finals ===
The final was started at 19:36.

Rank	Nation	Time	Behind	Notes
Gold medal race
1st place, gold medalist(s)	Netherlands; Roy van den Berg; Harrie Lavreysen; Jeffrey Hoogland	42.046		
2nd place, silver medalist(s)	Australia; Ryan Elliott; Leigh Hoffman; Thomas Cornish	42.673	+0.627	
Bronze medal race
3rd place, bronze medalist(s)	Japan; Yoshitaku Nagasako; Kaiya Ota; Yuta Obara	42.877		
4	Great Britain; Joseph Truman; Marcus Hiley; Harry Ledingham-Horn	43.322	+0.445	
