= Cycling at the 2024 Summer Olympics – Men's sprint =

Men's sprint at the Games of the XXXIII Olympiad
- Olympic track cycling
- Venues: Vélodrome National de Saint-Quentin-en-Yvelines
- Dates: 7–9 August 2024
- Competitors: 30 from 19 nations

Medalists
1st place, gold medalist(s)		Harrie Lavreysen	Netherlands
2nd place, silver medalist(s)		Matthew Richardson	Australia
3rd place, bronze medalist(s)		Jack Carlin	Great Britain

The men's sprint event at the 2024 Summer Olympics took place from 7 to 9 August 2024 at the Vélodrome National de Saint-Quentin-en-Yvelines.

== Background ==
This was the 28th appearance of the event, which has been held at every Summer Olympics except 1904 and 1912.

== Schedule ==
All times are Central European Time (UTC+2)

Date	Time	Round
7 August 2024	12:45; 14:30; 15:30; 17:30; 18:42; 19:38; 20:14	Qualifying; 1/32 finals 1/32 finals repechages 1/16 finals 1/16 finals repechages 1/8 finals 1/8 finals repechages
8 August 2024	18:01; 20:04	Quarterfinals; Classification 5–8
9 August 2024	14:41; 18:00	Semifinals; Final

== Results ==
=== Qualifying ===
Rank	Cyclist	Nation	Time	Behind	Notes
1	Harrie Lavreysen	Netherlands	9.088		Q, WR
2	Matthew Richardson	Australia	9.091	+0.003	Q
3	Mikhail Iakovlev	Israel	9.152	+0.064	Q
4	Leigh Hoffman	Australia	9.242	+0.154	Q
5	Jack Carlin	Great Britain	9.247	+0.159	Q
6	Jeffrey Hoogland	Netherlands	9.293	+0.205	Q
7	Hamish Turnbull	Great Britain	9.346	+0.258	Q
8	Kaiya Ota	Japan	9.350	+0.262	Q
9	Nicholas Paul	Trinidad and Tobago	9.371	+0.283	Q
10	Azizulhasni Awang	Malaysia	9.402	+0.314	Q
11	Mateusz Rudyk	Poland	9.416	+0.328	Q
12	Cristian Ortega	Colombia	9.426	+0.338	Q
13	Rayan Helal	France	9.447	+0.359	Q
14	Sam Dakin	New Zealand	9.470	+0.382	Q
15	Luca Spiegel	Germany	9.479	+0.391	Q
16	Yuta Obara	Japan	9.483	+0.395	Q
17	Sébastien Vigier	France	9.501	+0.413	Q
18	Zhou Yu	China	9.514	+0.426	Q
19	Vasilijus Lendel	Lithuania	9.581	+0.493	Q
20	Tyler Rorke	Canada	9.603	+0.515	Q
21	Nick Wammes	Canada	9.612	+0.524	Q
22	Muhammad Shah Firdaus Sahrom	Malaysia	9.635	+0.547	Q
23	Jaïr Tjon En Fa	Suriname	9.637	+0.549	Q
24	Maximilian Dörnbach	Germany	9.655	+0.567	Q
25	Kevin Quintero	Colombia	9.669	+0.581	
26	Kwesi Browne	Trinidad and Tobago	9.773	+0.685	
27	Jai Angsuthasawit	Thailand	9.898	+0.810	
28	Liu Qi	China	9.904	+0.816	
29	Jean Spies	South Africa	9.962	+0.874	
30	Andrey Chugay	Kazakhstan	10.047	+0.959	

=== 1/32 finals ===
Heat	Rank	Cyclist	Nation	Gap	Notes
1	1	Harrie Lavreysen	Netherlands	X	Q
1	2	Maximilian Dörnbach	Germany	+0.093	R
2	1	Matthew Richardson	Australia	X	Q
2	2	Jaïr Tjon En Fa	Suriname	+0.150	R
3	1	Mikhail Iakovlev	Israel	X	Q
3	2	Muhammad Shah Firdaus Sahrom	Malaysia	+0.569	R
4	1	Leigh Hoffman	Australia	X	Q
4	2	Nick Wammes	Canada	+0.556	R
5	1	Jack Carlin	Great Britain	X	Q
5	2	Tyler Rorke	Canada	+0.190	R
6	1	Jeffrey Hoogland	Netherlands	X	Q
6	2	Vasilijus Lendel	Lithuania	+0.122	R
7	1	Hamish Turnbull	Great Britain	X	Q
7	2	Zhou Yu	China	+0.071	R
8	1	Kaiya Ota	Japan	X	Q
8	2	Sébastien Vigier	France	+0.047	R
9	1	Nicholas Paul	Trinidad and Tobago	X	Q
9	2	Yuta Obara	Japan	+0.030	R
10	1	Azizulhasni Awang	Malaysia	X	Q
10	2	Luca Spiegel	Germany	+0.075	R
11	1	Mateusz Rudyk	Poland	X	Q
11	2	Sam Dakin	New Zealand	+0.020	R
12	1	Cristian Ortega	Colombia	X	Q
12	2	Rayan Helal	France	+0.007	R

=== 1/32 finals repechages ===
Heat	Rank	Cyclist	Nation	Gap	Notes
1	1	Yuta Obara	Japan	X	Q
1	2	Maximilian Dörnbach	Germany	+0.071	
1	3	Sébastien Vigier	France	+0.149	
2	1	Jaïr Tjon En Fa	Suriname	X	Q
2	2	Luca Spiegel	Germany	+0.020	
2	3	Zhou Yu	China	+0.132	
3	1	Vasilijus Lendel	Lithuania	X	Q
3	2	Muhammad Shah Firdaus Sahrom	Malaysia	+0.043	
3	3	Sam Dakin	New Zealand	+0.794	
4	1	Rayan Helal	France	X	Q
4	2	Tyler Rorke	Canada	+0.417	
4	3	Nick Wammes	Canada	+1.020	

=== 1/16 finals ===
Heat	Rank	Cyclist	Nation	Gap	Notes
1	1	Harrie Lavreysen	Netherlands	X	Q
1	2	Rayan Helal	France	+0.109	R
2	1	Matthew Richardson	Australia	X	Q
2	2	Vasilijus Lendel	Lithuania	+0.862	R
3	1	Mikhail Iakovlev	Israel	X	Q
3	2	Jaïr Tjon En Fa	Suriname	+0.157	R
4	1	Leigh Hoffman	Australia	X	Q
4	2	Yuta Obara	Japan	+0.255	R
5	1	Jack Carlin	Great Britain	X	Q
5	2	Cristian Ortega	Colombia	+0.091	R
6	1	Jeffrey Hoogland	Netherlands	X	Q
6	2	Mateusz Rudyk	Poland	+0.284	R
7	1	Azizulhasni Awang	Malaysia	X	Q
7	2	Hamish Turnbull	Great Britain	+0.034	R
8	1	Nicholas Paul	Trinidad and Tobago	X	Q
8	2	Kaiya Ota	Japan	+0.224	R

=== 1/16 finals repechages ===
Heat	Rank	Cyclist	Nation	Gap	Notes
1	1	Kaiya Ota	Japan	X	Q
1	2	Rayan Helal	France	+0.048	
2	1	Hamish Turnbull	Great Britain	X	Q
2	2	Vasilijus Lendel	Lithuania	+0.044	
3	1	Mateusz Rudyk	Poland	X	Q
3	2	Jaïr Tjon En Fa	Suriname	+0.054	
4	1	Yuta Obara	Japan	X	Q
4	2	Cristian Ortega	Colombia	+0.010	

=== 1/8 finals ===
Heat	Rank	Cyclist	Nation	Gap	Notes
1	1	Harrie Lavreysen	Netherlands	X	Q
1	2	Yuta Obara	Japan	+0.0164	R
2	1	Matthew Richardson	Australia	X	Q
2	2	Mateusz Rudyk	Poland	+0.136	R
3	1	Hamish Turnbull	Great Britain	X	Q
3	2	Mikhail Iakovlev	Israel	+0.001	R
4	1	Kaiya Ota	Japan	X	Q
4	2	Leigh Hoffman	Australia	+0.130	R
5	1	Jack Carlin	Great Britain	X	Q
5	2	Nicholas Paul	Trinidad and Tobago	+0.004	R
6	1	Jeffrey Hoogland	Netherlands	X	Q
6	2	Azizulhasni Awang	Malaysia	+0.037	R

=== 1/8 finals repechages ===
Heat	Rank	Cyclist	Nation	Gap	Notes
1	1	Yuta Obara	Japan	X	Q
1	2	Leigh Hoffman	Australia	+0.190	
1	3	Nicholas Paul	Trinidad and Tobago	+0.369	
2	1	Mateusz Rudyk	Poland	X	Q
2	2	Mikhail Iakovlev	Israel	+0.054	
2	3	Azizulhasni Awang	Malaysia	+0.190	

=== Quarterfinals ===
Heat	Rank	Cyclist	Nation	Race 1	Race 2	Decider (i.r.)	Notes
1	1	Harrie Lavreysen	Netherlands	X	X		SF
1	2	Mateusz Rudyk	Poland	+0.273	+0.105		F5-8
2	1	Matthew Richardson	Australia	X	X		SF
2	2	Yuta Obara	Japan	+0.562	+0.603		F5-8
3	1	Jeffrey Hoogland	Netherlands	+0.079	X	X	SF
3	2	Hamish Turnbull	Great Britain	X	+0.007	+0.276	F5-8
4	1	Jack Carlin	Great Britain	+0.046	X	X	SF
4	2	Kaiya Ota	Japan	X	REL	+0.014	F5-8

=== Classification 5–8 ===
Rank	Cyclist	Nation	Gap	Notes
5	Mateusz Rudyk	Poland	9.974	
6	Yuta Obara	Japan	+0.127	
7	Hamish Turnbull	Great Britain	REL	
7	Kaiya Ota	Japan	REL	w

=== Semifinals ===
Heat	Rank	Cyclist	Nation	Race 1	Race 2	Decider (i.r.)	Notes
1	1	Harrie Lavreysen	Netherlands	X	X		QG
1	2	Jack Carlin	Great Britain	+0.068	+0.068		QB
2	1	Matthew Richardson	Australia	X	X		QG
2	2	Jeffrey Hoogland	Netherlands	+0.029	+0.092		QB

=== Finals ===
Rank	Cyclist	Nation	Race 1	Race 2	Decider (i.r.)
Gold medal final
1st place, gold medalist(s)	Harrie Lavreysen	Netherlands	X	X	
2nd place, silver medalist(s)	Matthew Richardson	Australia	+0.024	+0.047	
Bronze medal final
3rd place, bronze medalist(s)	Jack Carlin	Great Britain	X	+0.049	X
4	Jeffrey Hoogland	Netherlands	+0.017	X	+0.041
