= Cycling at the 2024 Summer Olympics – Men's team sprint =

Men's team sprint at the Games of the XXXIII Olympiad
- Olympic track cycling
- Venues: Vélodrome National de Saint-Quentin-en-Yvelines
- Dates: 5–6 August 2024
- Competitors: 25 from 8 nations
- Teams: 8
- Winning time: 40.949

Medalists
1st place, gold medalist(s)		Jeffrey Hoogland; Harrie Lavreysen; Roy van den Berg	Netherlands
2nd place, silver medalist(s)		Jack Carlin; Ed Lowe; Hamish Turnbull	Great Britain
3rd place, bronze medalist(s)		Matthew Glaetzer; Leigh Hoffman; Matthew Richardson	Australia

The men's team sprint event at the 2024 Summer Olympics took place on 5 and 6 August 2024 at the Vélodrome National de Saint-Quentin-en-Yvelines.

== Background ==
This will be the 7th appearance of the event, which has been held at every Summer Olympics since 2000.

== Competition format ==
A men's team sprint race consists of a three-lap (750 m) race between two teams of three cyclists, starting on opposite sides of the track. Each member of the team must lead for one of the laps. The time for a team is measured to when the last cyclist finishes. Ties are broken by splits on the last lap.

The tournament consists of an initial qualifying round that seeds the teams. The first round comprises head-to-head races based on seeding (1st vs. 8th, 2nd vs. 7th, etc.). The winners of those four heats advance to the medal round, with the two fastest winners competing in the gold medal final and the two slower winners facing off for bronze.

== Schedule ==
All times are Central European Time (UTC+2)

Date	Time	Round
5 August	19:09	Qualifying
6 August	18:59	First round
6 August	19:55	Finals

== Results ==
=== Qualifying ===
Rank	Nation	Time	Behind	Notes
1	Netherlands; Roy van den Berg; Harrie Lavreysen; Jeffrey Hoogland	41.279		OR
2	Great Britain; Ed Lowe; Hamish Turnbull; Jack Carlin	41.862	+0.583	
3	Australia; Leigh Hoffman; Matthew Richardson; Matthew Glaetzer	42.072	+0.793	
4	Japan; Yoshitaku Nagasako; Kaiya Ota; Yuta Obara	42.174	+0.895	
5	France; Florian Grengbo; Sébastien Vigier; Rayan Helal	42.267	+0.988	
6	China; Guo Shuai; Zhou Yu; Liu Qi	42.606	+1.327	
7	Germany; Luca Spiegel; Stefan Bötticher; Maximilian Dörnbach	43.009	+1.730	
8	Canada; Tyler Rorke; Nick Wammes; James Hedgcock	43.905	+2.626	

=== First round ===
Heat	Rank	Nation	Time	Notes
1	1	France; Florian Grengbo; Sébastien Vigier; Rayan Helal	42.376	QB
1	2	Japan; Kaiya Ota; Yuta Obara; Yoshitaku Nagasako	42.569	
2	1	Australia; Matthew Glaetzer; Matthew Richardson; Leigh Hoffman	42.336	QB
2	2	China; Guo Shuai; Zhou Yu; Liu Qi	42.635	
3	1	Great Britain; Jack Carlin; Hamish Turnbull; Ed Lowe	41.819	QG
3	2	Germany; Maximilian Dörnbach; Luca Spiegel; Nik Schröter	42.348	
4	1	Netherlands; Roy van den Berg; Harrie Lavreysen; Jeffrey Hoogland	41.191	QG, WR
4	2	Canada; Nick Wammes; Tyler Rorke; James Hedgcock	43.666	

=== Finals ===
Rank	Nation	Time	Notes
Gold medal final
1st place, gold medalist(s)	Netherlands; Jeffrey Hoogland; Harrie Lavreysen; Roy van den Berg	40.949	WR
2nd place, silver medalist(s)	Great Britain; Jack Carlin; Ed Lowe; Hamish Turnbull	41.814	
Bronze medal final
3rd place, bronze medalist(s)	Australia; Matthew Glaetzer; Leigh Hoffman; Matthew Richardson	41.597	
4	France; Florian Grengbo; Rayan Helal; Sébastien Vigier	41.993	
Fifth place final
5	Japan; Yoshitaku Nagasako; Yuta Obara; Kaiya Ota	42.078	
6	Germany; Maximilian Dörnbach; Nik Schröter; Luca Spiegel	42.280	
Seventh place final
7	China; Guo Shuai; Liu Qi; Zhou Yu	42.532	
8	Canada; James Hedgcock; Tyler Rorke; Nick Wammes	43.944	
