= Cycling at the 2024 Summer Olympics – Men's keirin =

Men's Keirin at the Games of the XXXIII Olympiad
- Olympic track cycling
- Venues: Vélodrome National de Saint-Quentin-en-Yvelines
- Dates: 10–11 August 2024
- Competitors: 30 from 19 nations

Medalists
1st place, gold medalist(s)		Harrie Lavreysen	Netherlands
2nd place, silver medalist(s)		Matthew Richardson	Australia
3rd place, bronze medalist(s)		Matthew Glaetzer	Australia

The men's Keirin event at the 2024 Summer Olympics took place on 10 and 11 August 2024 at the Vélodrome National de Saint-Quentin-en-Yvelines.

== Background ==
This was the 7th appearance of the event, which has been held at every Summer Olympics since its introduction in 2000.

== Competition format ==
Keirin races involve up to 7 cyclists each (though the 2020 format has no races with more than 6). The cyclists follow a pace motorcycle for 3 laps (750 m); the motorcycle then pulls away and the cyclists race for another 3 laps. These distances are changed from the 2016 Games, shortening the paced section from 5.5 laps and lengthening the unpaced sprint from 2.5 laps. The motorcycle starts at 30 km/h and increases speed to 50 km/h before it pulls off.

The tournament consists of four main rounds (up from three in 2016) and a repechage:

- First round: Five heats of 6 cyclists each. The top 2 cyclists in each heat (10 total) advance to the second round; all others (20 cyclists) go to the repechage.
- Repechage: Four heats of 5 cyclists each. The top 2 cyclists in each heat (8 total) rejoin the first-round winners in the second round. The other 12 cyclists are eliminated.
- Second round: Three heats of 6 cyclists each. The top 4 cyclists in each heat (12 total) advance to the semifinals. The remaining 6 cyclists are eliminated.
- Semifinals: Two heats of 6 cyclists each. The top 3 cyclists in each semifinal (6 total) advance to Final A; the bottom 3 cyclists from each semifinal go to Final B, out of medal contention.
- Finals: Two finals. Final A consists of the top 6 cyclists, awarding medals and 4th through 6th place. Final B ranks the next 6 cyclists from 7th to 12th.

== Schedule ==
All times are Central European Time (UTC+2)

Date	Time	Round
10 August 2024	17:19; 17:50	First round Repechages
11 August 2024	11:29; 12:29; 13:23	Quarterfinals; Semifinals; Finals

== Results ==
=== First round ===
Heat 1

Rank	Cyclist	Nation	Gap	Notes
1	Matthew Glaetzer	Australia		QF
2	Jeffrey Hoogland	Netherlands	+0.011	QF
3	Kaiya Ota	Japan	+0.031	R
4	Jaïr Tjon En Fa	Suriname	+0.263	R
5	Rayan Helal	France	+0.942	R
	Azizulhasni Awang	Malaysia	DSQ	

Heat 2

Rank	Cyclist	Nation	Gap	Notes
1	Harrie Lavreysen	Netherlands		QF
2	Jack Carlin	Great Britain	+0.361	QF
3	Sébastien Vigier	France	+0.535	R
4	Zhou Yu	China	+0.819	R
5	Andrey Chugay	Kazakhstan	+1.166	R
6	Maximilian Dörnbach	Germany	+1.191	R

Heat 3

Rank	Cyclist	Nation	Gap	Notes
1	Matthew Richardson	Australia		QF
2	Shinji Nakano	Japan	+0.119	QF
3	Liu Qi	China	+0.157	R
4	Hamish Turnbull	Great Britain	+0.353	R
5	James Hedgcock	Canada	+0.400	R
6	Jean Spies	South Africa	+1.506	R

Heat 4

Rank	Cyclist	Nation	Gap	Notes
1	Mikhail Iakovlev	Israel		QF
2	Kevin Quintero	Colombia	+0.330	QF
3	Kwesi Browne	Trinidad and Tobago	+0.427	R
4	Jai Angsuthasawit	Thailand	+0.510	R
5	Nick Wammes	Canada	+0.618	R
6	Luca Spiegel	Germany	+0.767	R

Heat 5

Rank	Cyclist	Nation	Gap	Notes
1	Nicholas Paul	Trinidad and Tobago		QF
2	Mateusz Rudyk	Poland	+0.023	QF
3	Cristian Ortega	Colombia	+0.449	R
4	Sam Dakin	New Zealand	+0.519	R
5	Vasilijus Lendel	Lithuania	+3.197	R
6	Muhammad Shah Firdaus Sahrom	Malaysia	REL	R

=== Repechages ===
Heat 1

Rank	Cyclist	Nation	Gap	Notes
1	Kaiya Ota	Japan		QF
2	Sam Dakin	New Zealand	+0.143	QF
3	Jai Angsuthasawit	Thailand	+0.188	
4	Maximilian Dörnbach	Germany	+0.194	
5	Jean Spies	South Africa	+0.249	

Heat 2

Rank	Cyclist	Nation	Gap	Notes
1	Hamish Turnbull	Great Britain		QF
2	Luca Spiegel	Germany	+0.069	QF
3	Sébastien Vigier	France	+0.120	
4	Vasilijus Lendel	Lithuania	+0.146	
5	Zhou Yu	China	REL	

Heat 3

Rank	Cyclist	Nation	Gap	Notes
1	Muhammad Shah Firdaus Sahrom	Malaysia		QF
2	Nick Wammes	Canada	+0.014	QF
3	Liu Qi	China	+0.121	
4	Jaïr Tjon En Fa	Suriname	+0.144	
5	Rayan Helal	France	REL	

Heat 4

Rank	Cyclist	Nation	Gap	Notes
1	James Hedgcock	Canada		QF
2	Cristian Ortega	Colombia	+0.053	QF
3	Andrey Chugay	Kazakhstan	+0.090	
	Kwesi Browne	Trinidad and Tobago	DNF	

=== Quarterfinals ===
Heat 1

Rank	Cyclist	Nation	Gap	Notes
1	Jack Carlin	Great Britain		QF
2	Matthew Glaetzer	Australia	+0.006	QF
3	Muhammad Shah Firdaus Sahrom	Malaysia	+0.051	QF
4	Kaiya Ota	Japan	+0.059	QF
5	Mikhail Iakovlev	Israel	+0.215	
5	James Hedgcock	Canada	+0.310	

Heat 2

Rank	Cyclist	Nation	Gap	Notes
1	Harrie Lavreysen	Netherlands		QF
2	Hamish Turnbull	Great Britain	+0.089	QF
3	Cristian Ortega	Colombia	+0.138	QF
4	Shinji Nakano	Japan	+0.261	QF
5	Nicholas Paul	Trinidad and Tobago	+0.582	
6	Nick Wammes	Canada	+1.035	

Heat 3

Rank	Cyclist	Nation	Gap	Notes
1	Matthew Richardson	Australia		QF
2	Sam Dakin	New Zealand	+0.346	QF
3	Mateusz Rudyk	Poland	+0.444	QF
4	Luca Spiegel	Germany	+0.491	QF
5	Jeffrey Hoogland	Netherlands	+0.514	
6	Kevin Quintero	Colombia	+0.554	

=== Semifinals ===
Heat 1

Rank	Cyclist	Nation	Gap	Notes
1	Jack Carlin	Great Britain		FA
2	Matthew Glaetzer	Australia	+0.345	FA
3	Shinji Nakano	Japan	+0.364	FA
4	Cristian Ortega	Colombia	+0.470	FB
5	Sam Dakin	New Zealand	+0.644	FB
6	Mateusz Rudyk	Poland	+2.528	FB

Heat 2

Rank	Cyclist	Nation	Gap	Notes
1	Matthew Richardson	Australia	+0.582	FA
2	Harrie Lavreysen	Netherlands	+0.234	FA
3	Muhammad Shah Firdaus Sahrom	Malaysia	+0.437	FA
	Hamish Turnbull	Great Britain	DNF	FB
	Luca Spiegel	Germany	DNF	FB
	Kaiya Ota	Japan	DSQ	

=== Finals ===
==== Final A ====
Rank	Cyclist	Nation	Gap	Notes
1st place, gold medalist(s)	Harrie Lavreysen	Netherlands		
2nd place, silver medalist(s)	Matthew Richardson	Australia	+0.056	
3rd place, bronze medalist(s)	Matthew Glaetzer	Australia	+0.881	
	Jack Carlin	Great Britain	DNF	
	Shinji Nakano	Japan	DNF	
6	Muhammad Shah Firdaus Sahrom	Malaysia	REL	

==== Final B ====
Rank	Cyclist	Nation	Gap	Notes
7	Cristian Ortega	Colombia		
8	Sam Dakin	New Zealand	+0.015	
9	Luca Spiegel	Germany	+0.147	
10	Mateusz Rudyk	Poland	+0.248	
	Hamish Turnbull	Great Britain	DNS	
