= Tayte Ryan =

Australian track cyclist (born 2006)

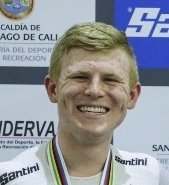
- Ryan at the 2023 Junior Track cycling World Championships

Personal information
- Born: 9 February 2006 (age 20)

Cycling career
- Sport: Cycling
- Discipline: Track
- Role: Rider
- Rider type: Sprinter
Medal record
Men's track cycling
Representing Australia
Commonwealth Games
Bronze medal – third place	2026 Glasgow	Sprint
Bronze medal – third place	2026 Glasgow	1 km time trial
World Junior Championships
Gold medal – first place	2024 Luoyang	Sprint
Gold medal – first place	2024 Luoyang	1km TT
Gold medal – first place	2023 Cali	1km TT
Silver medal – second place	2023 Cali	Sprint
Commonwealth Youth Games
Gold medal – first place	2023 Trinbago	Sprint
Gold medal – first place	2023 Trinbago	1km TT
Gold medal – first place	2023 Trinbago	Keirin

Tayte Ryan (born 9 February 2006) is an Australian track cyclist. In 2024, he won gold medals in the sprint and 1 km time trial at the 2024 UCI Junior Track Cycling World Championships and became the world junior record holder in the 1 km time trial, becoming the first junior to break the 60-second barrier.

== Career ==
From South Australia, he started cycling with Port Adelaide cycling club in 2020. He joined the South Australian Sport Institute when he was 14 years old.

He won gold in the 1 km time trial at the 2023 UCI Junior Track Cycling World Championships and won three gold medals in the Sprint, Keirin, and 1 km time trial at the 2023 Commonwealth Youth Games in Trinbago. In April 2024, he was nominated for Australian Emerging Athlete of the Year. He also won four gold medals at the 2024 Oceania Track Championships.

He won gold medals in the sprint and 1 km time trial at the 2024 UCI Junior Track Cycling World Championships. In doing so, he set a world junior record in the 1 km time trial in Luoyang, China, with a time of 59.875 seconds, making him the first junior to ever go under the 60-second barrier. Later that year, he jumped up to the elite level to compete in the 2024 UCI Track Champions League.

Ryan was awarded a Tier 1 Scholarship within the 2025 Sport Australia Hall of Fame Scholarship and Mentoring Program, where he was paired with mentor Steven Bradbury. He made his elite debut at the 2025 UCI Track World Championships, finishing fifth in the 1 km time trial. He was selected to represent Australia at the 2026 Commonwealth Games in Glasgow, marking his elite Commonwealth Games debut, winning bronze medals in the individual sprint and 1000m time trial.
