= 2023 UCI Track Cycling World Championships – Men's 1 km time trial =

Men's 1 km time trial at the 2023 UCI Track Cycling World Championships
- Venue: Sir Chris Hoy Velodrome
- Location: Glasgow, United Kingdom
- Dates: 8 August
- Competitors: 25 from 19 nations
- Winning time: 58.222

Medalists
gold medal	Jeffrey Hoogland	Netherlands
silver medal	Matthew Glaetzer	Australia
bronze medal	Thomas Cornish	Australia

The Men's 1 km time trial competition at the 2023 UCI Track Cycling World Championships was held on 8 August 2023.

== Results ==
=== Qualifying ===
The qualifying was held at 14:06. The top eight riders qualified for the final.

Rank	Name	Nation	Time	Behind	Notes
1	Jeffrey Hoogland	Netherlands	57.971		Q
2	Matthew Glaetzer	Australia	58.572	+0.601	Q
3	Thomas Cornish	Australia	58.798	+0.827	Q
4	Maximilian Dörnbach	Germany	59.391	+1.420	Q
5	Joseph Truman	Great Britain	59.507	+1.536	Q
6	Patryk Rajkowski	Poland	59.889	+1.918	Q
7	Matteo Bianchi	Italy	59.911	+1.940	Q
8	Alejandro Martínez	Spain	1:00.183	+2.212	Q
9	Santiago Ramírez	Colombia	1:00.199	+2.228	
10	Xue Chenxi	China	1:00.310	+2.339	
11	Juan Ruiz	Mexico	1:00.357	+2.386	
12	Melvin Landerneau	France	1:00.495	+2.524	
13	Roy van den Berg	Netherlands	1:00.530	+2.559	
14	Cristian Ortega	Colombia	1:00.539	+2.568	
15	Willy Weinrich	Germany	1:00.729	+2.758	
16	Ryan Dodyk	Canada	1:00.775	+2.804	
17	Nick Kergozou	New Zealand	1:00.821	+2.850	
18	Muhammad Fadhil Mohd Zonis	Malaysia	1:01.409	+3.438	
19	Matěj Hytych	Czech Republic	1:01.626	+3.655	
20	Edgar Verdugo	Mexico	1:01.823	+3.852	
21	José Moreno	Spain	1:01.950	+3.979	
22	Johannes Myburgh	South Africa	1:03.287	+5.316	
23	Andrey Chugay	Kazakhstan	1:04.185	+6.214	
24	Ronaldo Laitonjam	India	1:04.418	+6.447	
25	Hussein Hassan	Egypt	1:06.755	+8.784	

=== Final ===
The final was held at 17:25.

Rank	Name	Nation	Time	Behind	Notes
1st place, gold medalist(s)	Jeffrey Hoogland	Netherlands	58.222		
2nd place, silver medalist(s)	Matthew Glaetzer	Australia	58.526	+0.304	
3rd place, bronze medalist(s)	Thomas Cornish	Australia	58.822	+0.600	
4	Joseph Truman	Great Britain	59.092	+0.870	
5	Maximilian Dörnbach	Germany	59.245	+1.023	
6	Patryk Rajkowski	Poland	1:00.096	+1.874	
7	Matteo Bianchi	Italy	1:00.099	+1.877	
8	Alejandro Martínez	Spain	1:00.192	+1.970	
