= Leigh Hoffman =

Australian track cyclist (born 2000)

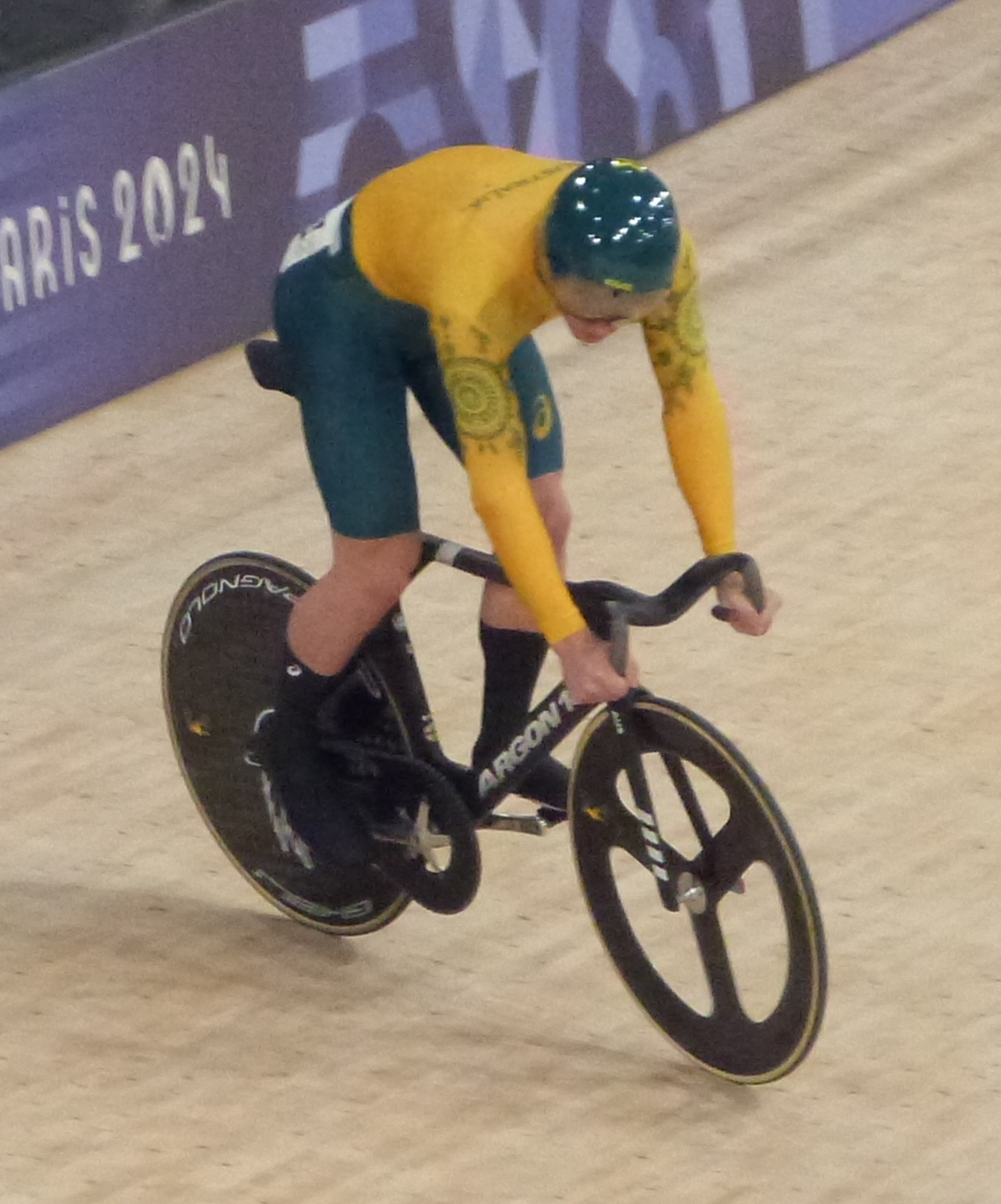
- Hoffman in 2024

Personal information
- Born: 11 June 2000 (age 26) Whyalla, South Australia

Cycling career
- Sport: Cycling
- Discipline: Track
- Role: Rider
- Rider type: Sprinter
Medal record
Men's track cycling
Representing Australia
Olympic Games
| Bronze medal – third place | 2024 Paris | Team sprint |
World Championships
| Gold medal – first place | 2022 Saint-Quentin-en-Yvelines | Team sprint |
| Silver medal – second place | 2023 Glasgow | Team sprint |
| Silver medal – second place | 2024 Ballerup | Team sprint |
| Silver medal – second place | 2025 Santiago | Keirin |
| Silver medal – second place | 2026 Shanghai | Sprint |
| Silver medal – second place | 2026 Shanghai | Team sprint |
| Bronze medal – third place | 2025 Santiago | Team sprint |
| Bronze medal – third place | 2025 Santiago | Sprint |
Commonwealth Games
| Gold medal – first place | 2022 Birmingham | Team sprint |
| Gold medal – first place | 2026 Glasgow | Team sprint |
| Gold medal – first place | 2026 Glasgow | Sprint |
| Gold medal – first place | 2026 Glasgow | 1 km time trial |
| Silver medal – second place | 2026 Glasgow | Keirin |

Leigh Hoffman (born 11 June 2000) is an Australian track cyclist. He is a multiple-time medal winner at international track cycling events, including a bronze medal at the 2024 Olympic Games in the team sprint, and gold medals in the team sprint at the 2022 Commonwealth Games, and the 2022 World Championships, where he set a world best time for the opening lap from a standing start in the final. He also won three gold medals and a silver at the 2026 Commonwealth Games, becoming the first Australian cyclist to win four medals at a single Commonwealth Games.

== Early life ==
Hoffman was brought up in Whyalla in South Australia but moved as teenager to Adelaide to be nearer his training base at the SA Sports Institute, enrolling at the Immanuel College at Novar Gardens.

== Career ==
Hoffman was a gold medalist at the 2022 Commonwealth Games in the men’s team sprint competition alongside Matthew Richardson and Matthew Glaetzer. Prior to this, he had won the team sprint at the UCI Track Nations Cup in Glasgow. In October 2022 at the World Championships held at the Quentin-en-Yvelines Velodrome, France, Hoffman won gold in the team sprint as Australia defeated the three-time defending champions Netherlands in the final. In that race, he set a world best time for the opening lap from a standing start in the final of 16.949 seconds.

In August 2023, Hoffman, Richardson and Glaetzer won the silver medal at the 2023 UCI Track Cycling World Championships in the team sprint in Glasgow, Scotland.

Alongside Richardson and Glaetzer, he won the bronze medal in the team sprint at the 2024 Olympic Games in Paris, France. After Richardson and Glaetzer left the Australian programme, Hoffman was a silver medalist later in the year at the 2024 UCI Track Cycling World Championships, with Thomas Cornish and Ryan Elliott. Hoffman subsequently won the Australian individual track sprint national title.

In October 2025, Hoffman won a silver medal in the keirin at the 2025 World Championships in Santiago, Chile. He also won a bronze medal in the team sprint alongside Ryan Elliott and Daniel Barber. In the individual sprint, he defeated Jeffrey Hoogland and Nicholas Paul to win his third medal, and second bronze, at the Championships.

On 30 July 2026, Hoffman won a gold medal in the team sprint at the 2026 Commonwealth Games in Glasgow, Scotland. Later at the Games, Hoffman won the individual sprint gold medal and broke the Commonwealth Games record in the men's 1000m time trial with a time of 9.361 on 1 August. He also won a silver medal in the keirin at the Games to become the first Australian cyclist to win four medals at a single Commonwealth Games. In October, Hoffman won silver medals in the team sprint and individual sprint at the 2026 UCI Track Cycling World Championships in Shanghai, China. Hoffman had qualified with the fastest flying 200m but was beaten to gold by Harrie Lavreysen, who won his 23rd world title, having been a member of the Dutch team that beat Australia to the team gold.

== See also ==
- List of world records in track cycling
