= Guo Shuai =

Chinese cyclist (born 1995)

Personal information
- Born: 1 May 1995 (age 31) China

Cycling career
- Sport: Cycling
- Discipline: Track
Medal record
Men's track cycling
Representing China
Asian Games
Silver medal – second place	2022 Hangzhou	Team sprint
Asian Championships
Silver medal – second place	2019 Jakarta	Team sprint
Silver medal – second place	2023 Nilai	Team sprint

Guo Shuai (born 1 May 1995) is a Chinese cyclist. He competed in the men's team sprint event at the 2024 Summer Olympics.
