= Zion Pulido =

Trinidadian track cyclist (born 2000)

Personal information
- Born: 22 November 2000 (age 25)

Cycling career
- Sport: Cycling
- Discipline: Track
- Role: Rider
- Rider type: Sprinter
Medal record
Men's track cycling
Representing Trinidad and Tobago
Commonwealth Games
Bronze medal – third place	2026 Glasgow	Team sprint
Pan American Championships
Gold medal – first place	2022 Lima	Team sprint
Silver medal – second place	2023 San Juan	Team sprint
Silver medal – second place	2021 Lima	Team sprint
Bronze medal – third place	2026 Santiago	Team sprint

Zion Pulido (born 22 November 2000) is a Trinidadian track cyclist, who competes in sprinting events.

== Career ==
Pulido joined the Trinidad and Tobago sprint team in 2021. Pulido was a gold medalist in the team sprint at the 2022 Pan American Track Cycling Championships. He was also a silver medalist in the team sprint at the 2021 and 2023 Pan American Track Cycling Championships.

Pulido won a bronze medal for Trinidad and Tobago in the team sprint at the 2026 Pan American Track Cycling Championships, defeating Mexico in the bronze medal race. Pulido competed at the 2026 Commonwealth Games in Glasgow, Scotland.
