= 2024 UCI Track Cycling World Championships – Men's 1 km time trial =

Men's 1 km time trial at the 2024 UCI Track Cycling World Championships
- Venue: Ballerup Super Arena
- Location: Ballerup, Denmark
- Dates: 18 October
- Competitors: 23 from 17 nations
- Winning time: 57.321

Medalists
gold medal	Harrie Lavreysen	Netherlands
silver medal	Jeffrey Hoogland	Netherlands
bronze medal	Joseph Truman	Great Britain

The Men's 1 km time trial competition at the 2024 UCI Track Cycling World Championships was held on 18 October 2024.

== Results ==
=== Qualifying ===
The qualifying was started at 14:00. The top eight riders qualified for the final.

Rank	Name	Nation	Time	Behind	Notes
1	Harrie Lavreysen	Netherlands	57.468		Q
2	Jeffrey Hoogland	Netherlands	57.761	+0.293	Q
3	Joseph Truman	Great Britain	58.667	+1.199	Q
4	Cristian Ortega	Colombia	59.783	+2.315	Q
5	Santiago Ramírez	Colombia	1:00.081	+2.613	Q
6	Thomas Cornish	Australia	1:00.124	+2.656	Q
7	Kirill Kurdidi	Kazakhstan	1:00.417	+2.949	Q
8	Robin Skivild	Denmark	1:00.560	+3.092	Q
9	Eliasz Bednarek	Poland	1:00.792	+3.324	
10	Melvin Landerneau	France	1:00.850	+3.382	
11	Jakub Malášek	Czech Republic	1:00.951	+3.483	
12	Dominik Topinka	Czech Republic	1:01.223	+3.587	
13	Henric Hackmann	Germany	1:01.055	+3.755	
14	Alejandro Martínez	Spain	1:01.577	+4.109	
15	Kazushige Kuboki	Japan	1:01.712	+4.244	
16	Pete-Collin Flemming	Germany	1:01.932	+4.464	
17	Edgar Verdugo	Mexico	1:02.008	+4.540	
18	Stefano Minuta	Italy	1:02.013	+4.545	
19	David Elkathchoongo	India	1:02.415	+4.947	
20	David Domonoske	United States	1:02.559	+5.091	
21	Johannes Myburgh	South Africa	1:02.564	+5.096	
22	Konrad Burawski	Poland	1:02.654	+5.186	
–	Matteo Bianchi	Italy	Did not finish		

=== Final ===
The final was held at 19:00.

Rank	Name	Nation	Time	Behind	Notes
1st place, gold medalist(s)	Harrie Lavreysen	Netherlands	57.321		
2nd place, silver medalist(s)	Jeffrey Hoogland	Netherlands	58.252	+0.931	
3rd place, bronze medalist(s)	Joseph Truman	Great Britain	58.669	+1.348	
4	Cristian Ortega	Colombia	59.824	+2.503	
5	Santiago Ramírez	Colombia	1:00.055	+2.734	
6	Thomas Cornish	Australia	1:00.197	+2.876	
7	Kirill Kurdidi	Kazakhstan	1:00.853	+3.532	
8	Robin Skivild	Denmark	1:00.926	+3.605	
