= Harry Ledingham-Horn =

British cyclist

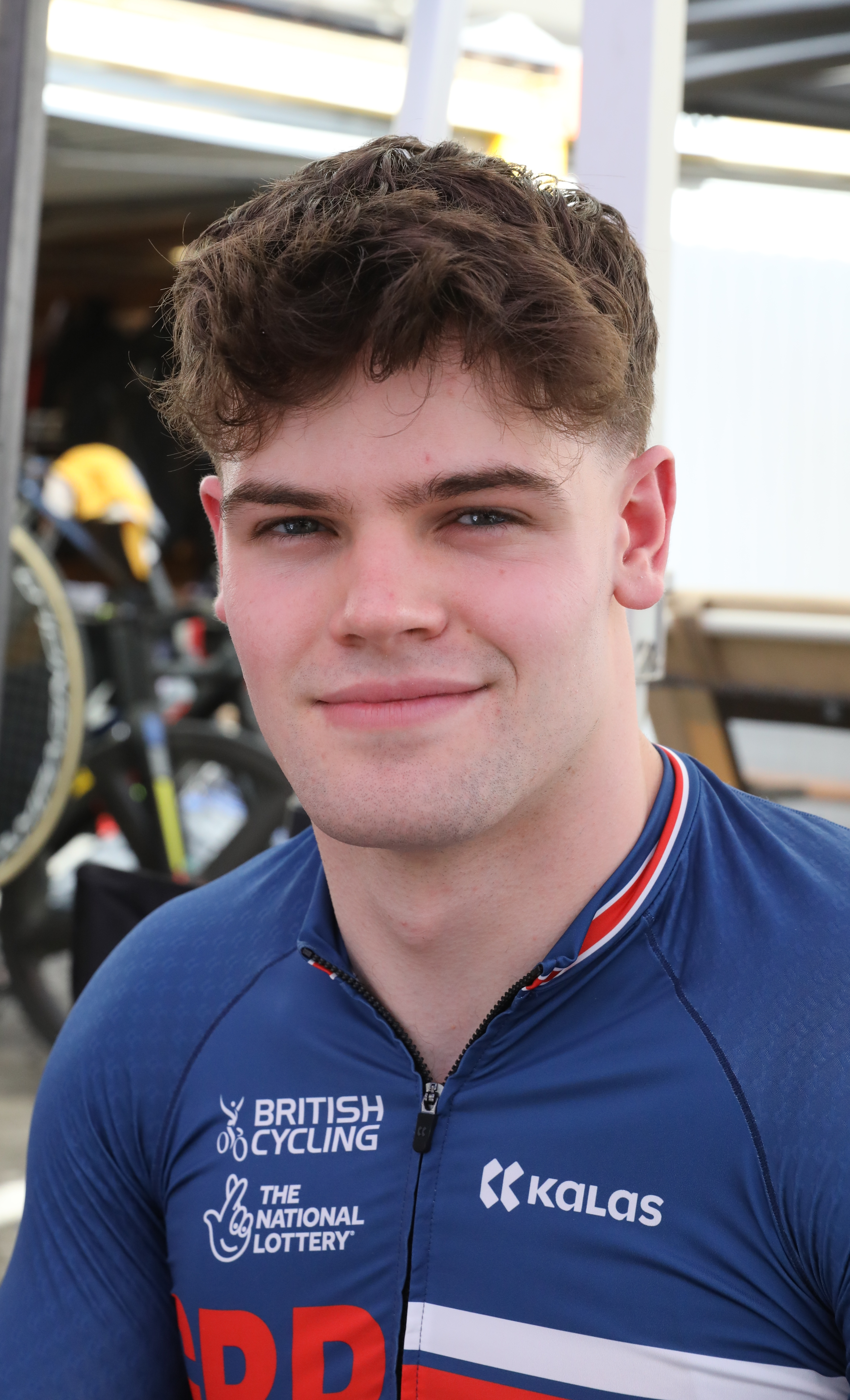
- Harry Ledingham-Horn in 2024

Personal information
- Born: 9 December 2003 (age 22) Stoke-on-Trent, England

Cycling career
- Sport: Cycling
- Current team: Team Inspired
- Discipline: Track cycling
- Role: Rider
- Rider type: Sprinter
Medal record
Men's track cycling
Representing Great Britain
World Championships
Silver medal – second place	2025 Santiago	Team sprint
European Championships
Bronze medal – third place	2025 Heusden-Zolder	Team sprint
Representing England
Commonwealth Games
Silver medal – second place	2026 Glasgow	Team sprint
Bronze medal – third place	2026 Glasgow	Keirin

Harry Ledingham-Horn (born 9 December 2003) is a British track cyclist.

== Career ==
Ledingham-Horn began his cycling career with Lyme RC in Newcastle-under-Lyme. He attended Newcastle-under-Lyme School.

He came to prominence after winning two national titles at the 2023 British Cycling National Track Championships. He won the team sprint (alongside Marcus Hiley and Ed Lowe) and the sprint. The following year, he defended his national team sprint title at the 2024 British Cycling National Track Championships, this time alongside Lowe and Hayden Norris. He finished third in the sprint event, having beaten Lyall Craig in the bronze medal final. Pete Mitchell took the gold medal, and Hiley the silver.

On 7 October 2024 it was announced that Ledingham-Horn would make his elite debut as part of the Great Britain squad competing at the 2024 UCI Track Cycling World Championships. He competed in the team sprint with Joseph Truman, Marcus Hiley and Hayden Norris. The team qualified fourth fastest and went on to beat France in round one to reach the bronze medal final. They finished fourth overall, losing out to the Japanese team with a margin of 0.445 seconds. He also competed in the keirin, where he finished fourth overall. Only the top three finishers in each semi-final qualified for the gold medal final; Ledingham-Horn finished third and beat reigning Olympic keirin champion Harrie Lavreysen to the line, denying the Dutchman the chance to progress in the competition and add to his medal collection.

At the 2025 Track Cycling World Championships in Santiago, Ledingham-Horn, along with teammates Matthew Richardson, Hamish Turnbull and Joe Truman, clinched a silver medal in the team sprint for Great Britain. He took part in the qualifying round but was replaced by Turnbull for the final.

At the 2026 Commonwealth Games in Glasgow, Ledingham-Horn, Turnbull and Truman won silver in the team sprint. The English trio were defeated by Australia in the gold medal race. Later in the competition, he won bronze in the keirin and finished fourth in the 1 km time trial.

== Major results ==
2020
National Track Championships

3rd Team sprint (with Hayden Norris and Ed Lowe)

2021
UEC European Junior Championships

1st Team sprint (with Marcus Hiley and Ed Lowe)
2nd 1km time trial
3rd Sprint

2022
National Track Championships

2nd Team sprint (with James Bunting, Marcus Hiley and Hayden Norris)

2023
National Track Championships

1st Sprint
1st Team sprint (with Marcus Hiley and Ed Lowe)

2024
National Track Championships

1st Team sprint (with Ed Lowe and Hayden Norris)
3rd Sprint

UEC European U23 Championships

2nd Team sprint (with Marcus Hiley and Hayden Norris)
3rd 1km time trial

2025
National Track Championships

1st Team sprint (with Lyall Craig, Niall Monks and Matthew Richardson)

UEC European Championships

3rd Team sprint (with Hayden Norris and Harry Radford)

UCI Nations Cup

1st Team sprint, Konya (with Harry Radford and Matthew Richardson)
2nd Sprint, Konya

UCI World Championships

2nd Team sprint (with Matthew Richardson, Hamish Turnbull and Joseph Truman)

2026
Commonwealth Games

2nd Team sprint (with Hamish Turnbull and Joseph Truman)
3rd Keirin
