= Ryan Elliott (cyclist) =

Australian track cyclist (born 2004)

Personal information
- Born: 6 April 2004 (age 22) Brisbane, Queensland
- Height: 182 cm (6 ft 0 in)
- Weight: 84 kg (185 lb)

Cycling career
- Sport: Cycling
- Discipline: Track
- Role: Rider
- Rider type: Sprinter
Medal record
Men's track cycling
Representing Australia
World Championships
Silver medal – second place	2024 Ballerup	Team sprint
Silver medal – second place	2026 Shanghai	Team sprint
Bronze medal – third place	2025 Santiago	Team sprint
Commonwealth Games
Gold medal – first place	2026 Glasgow	Team sprint
World Junior Championships
Gold medal – first place	2022 Tel Aviv	Team sprint
Silver medal – second place	2022 Tel Aviv	Sprint

Ryan Elliott (born 6 April 2004) is an Australian track cyclist who competes in sprinting events. He won a silver medal in the team sprint at the 2024 UCI Track Cycling World Championships in addition to two medals at the 2022 UCI Junior Track Cycling World Championships.
