= Matthew Glaetzer =

Australian track cyclist (born 1992)

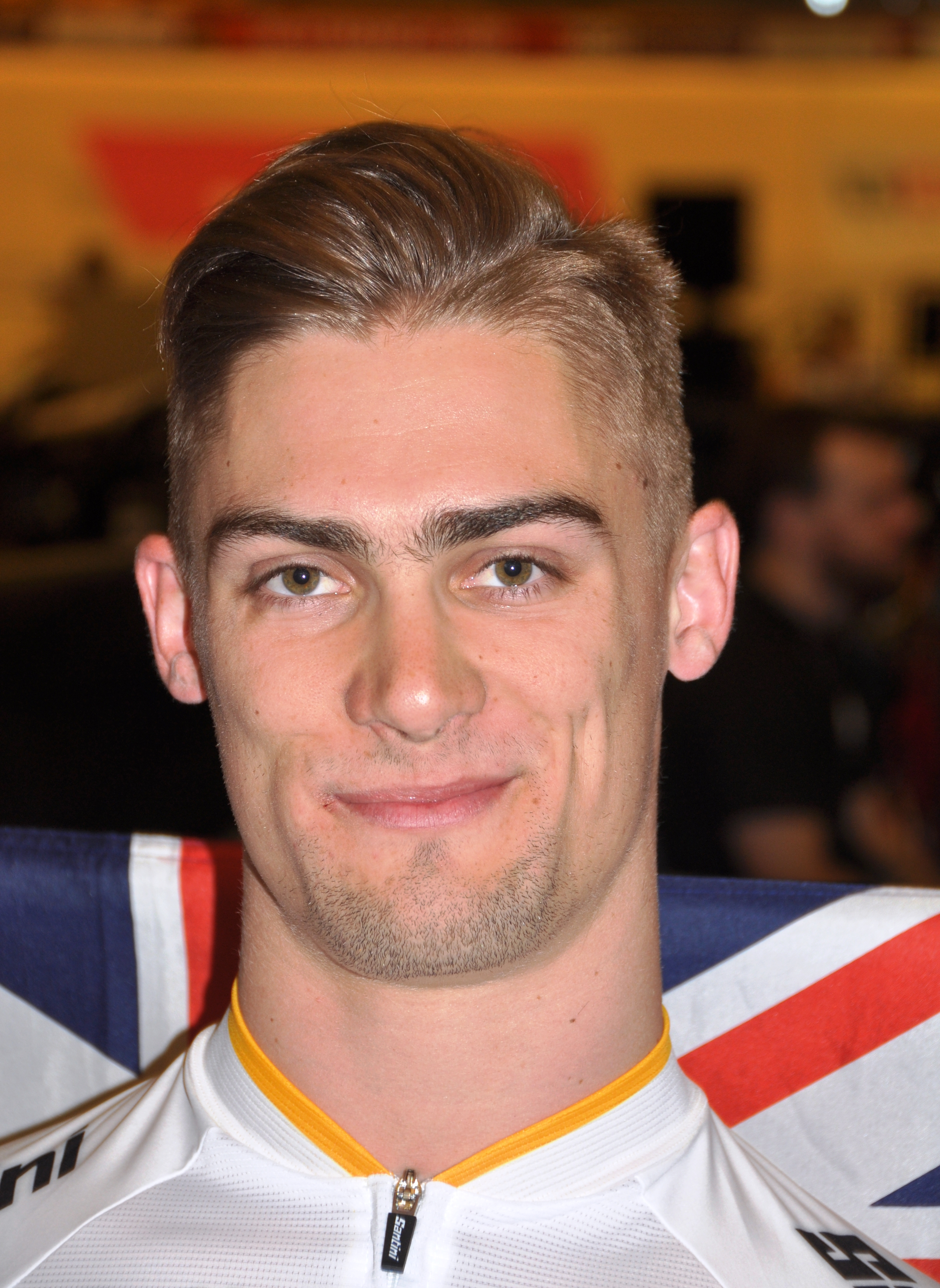
- Glaetzer in 2018

Personal information
- Born: 24 August 1992 (age 34) Adelaide, South Australia
- Height: 1.90 m (6 ft 3 in)
- Weight: 86 kg (190 lb)

Cycling career
- Sport: Cycling
- Discipline: Track cycling
- Role: Rider
- Rider type: Sprint
Medal record
Men's track cycling
Representing Australia
Olympic Games
Bronze medal – third place	2024 Paris	Team sprint
Bronze medal – third place	2024 Paris	Keirin
World Championships
Gold medal – first place	2012 Melbourne	Team sprint
Gold medal – first place	2018 Apeldoorn	Sprint
Gold medal – first place	2022 Saint-Quentin-en-Yvelines	Team sprint
Silver medal – second place	2016 London	Sprint
Silver medal – second place	2018 Apeldoorn	1 km time trial
Silver medal – second place	2023 Glasgow	1 km time trial
Silver medal – second place	2023 Glasgow	Team sprint
Bronze medal – third place	2011 Apeldoorn	Team sprint
Bronze medal – third place	2022 Saint-Quentin-en-Yvelines	Sprint
Commonwealth Games
Gold medal – first place	2014 Glasgow	Keirin
Gold medal – first place	2018 Gold Coast	Keirin
Gold medal – first place	2018 Gold Coast	1 km time trial
Gold medal – first place	2022 Birmingham	Team sprint
Gold medal – first place	2022 Birmingham	1 km time trial
Bronze medal – third place	2014 Glasgow	Team sprint
Bronze medal – third place	2018 Gold Coast	Team sprint

Matthew Glaetzer (born 24 August 1992) is an Australian former track cyclist specialising in sprint events. He has represented Australia at four Olympic Games (2012, 2016, 2020 and 2024). At the 2024 Games he won two bronze medals.

== Career ==
He competed in the team sprint event at the 2012 Summer Olympics, and won the 2012 World Championship in the team sprint with Scott Sunderland and Shane Perkins.

Glaetzer represented Australia in the men's sprint, men's keirin, and men's team sprint events at the 2016 Summer Olympics in Rio de Janeiro, Brazil.

On 12 November 2017, at the World Cup competition in Manchester, Glaetzer became the first rider ever to break the 1:00-minute mark for 1 km time trial, at sea level velodrome.

At the 2018 Commonwealth Games, Glaetzer won gold in the men's keirin. He was eliminated from the men's sprint in the quarterfinals. The next day, he won gold in the men's 1 km time trial.

At the Tokyo 2020 Olympics, Glaetzer courted controversy during the Keirin finals when he allowed a huge gap between Jason Kenny from Great Britain and the rest of the field.

At the 2022 Commonwealth Games, Glaetzer won gold in the men's team sprint alongside Leigh Hoffman and Matthew Richardson on the first day of the games. He also competed in the men's individual sprint event where he came 4th.

On 28 June 2024, Glaetzer was announced as a member of Australia's 2024 Olympics track cycling squad, the fourth Games of his career. He won his first Olympic medals in Paris; a bronze in the team sprint alongside Hoffman and Richardson, and a bronze in the keirin (beaten only by Richardson and Harrie Lavreysen).

== Competition record ==
Year	Competition	Venue	Position	Event	Notes
Representing Australia
2016	Olympic Games	Rio de Janeiro, Brazil	4th	Men's sprint	Lost bronze medal final to Denis Dmitriev
2016	Olympic Games	Rio de Janeiro, Brazil	10th	Men's keirin	Came 4th in 7–12 final
2016	Olympic Games	Rio de Janeiro, Brazil	4th	Men's team sprint	Lost bronze medal final to France
2024	Olympic Games	Paris, France			
2024	Olympic Games	Paris, France	3rd	Men's keirin	Came 3rd behind Harrie Lavreysen and fellow Australian Matthew Richardson
2024	Olympic Games	Paris, France	3rd	Men's team sprint	Won bronze medal final over France
Representing Australia

== Personal life ==
Glaetzer is a Christian. He stated that he has been a Christian all his life, but drifted from God during his teens due to injuries. He rededicated his life to God at a camp run by his local church. He also said God gave him the gift of cycling. Glaetzer leads a youth group at Influencers Church in Paradise, Adelaide.

Glaetzer is a student at University of South Australia, where he is studying a degree in Human Movement. He has stated that he wants to go into physiotherapy when he retires from cycling.

In October 2019, Glaetzer was diagnosed with thyroid cancer.
