= Yuta Obara =

Japanese cyclist (born 1996)

Personal information
- Born: 29 February 1996 (age 30) Hashikami, Aomori, Japan
- Height: 1.72 m (5 ft 8 in)
- Weight: 74 kg (163 lb)

Cycling career
- Sport: Cycling
- Discipline: Track cycling
- Role: Rider
Medal record
Men's track cycling
Representing Japan
World Championships
Bronze medal – third place	2024 Ballerup	Team sprint
Asian Games
Gold medal – first place	2022 Hangzhou	Team sprint
Asian Championships
Gold medal – first place	2022 New Delhi	1 km time trial
Gold medal – first place	2022 New Delhi	Team sprint
Gold medal – first place	2023 Nilai	Team sprint
Gold medal – first place	2024 New Delhi	Sprint
Gold medal – first place	2024 New Delhi	Team sprint

Yuta Obara (小原佑太, Obara Yuta; born 29 February 1996) is a Japanese track cyclist. He is also active in Japan as a keirin cyclist.
