= Joseph Truman =

British cyclist (born 1997)

Joe Truman
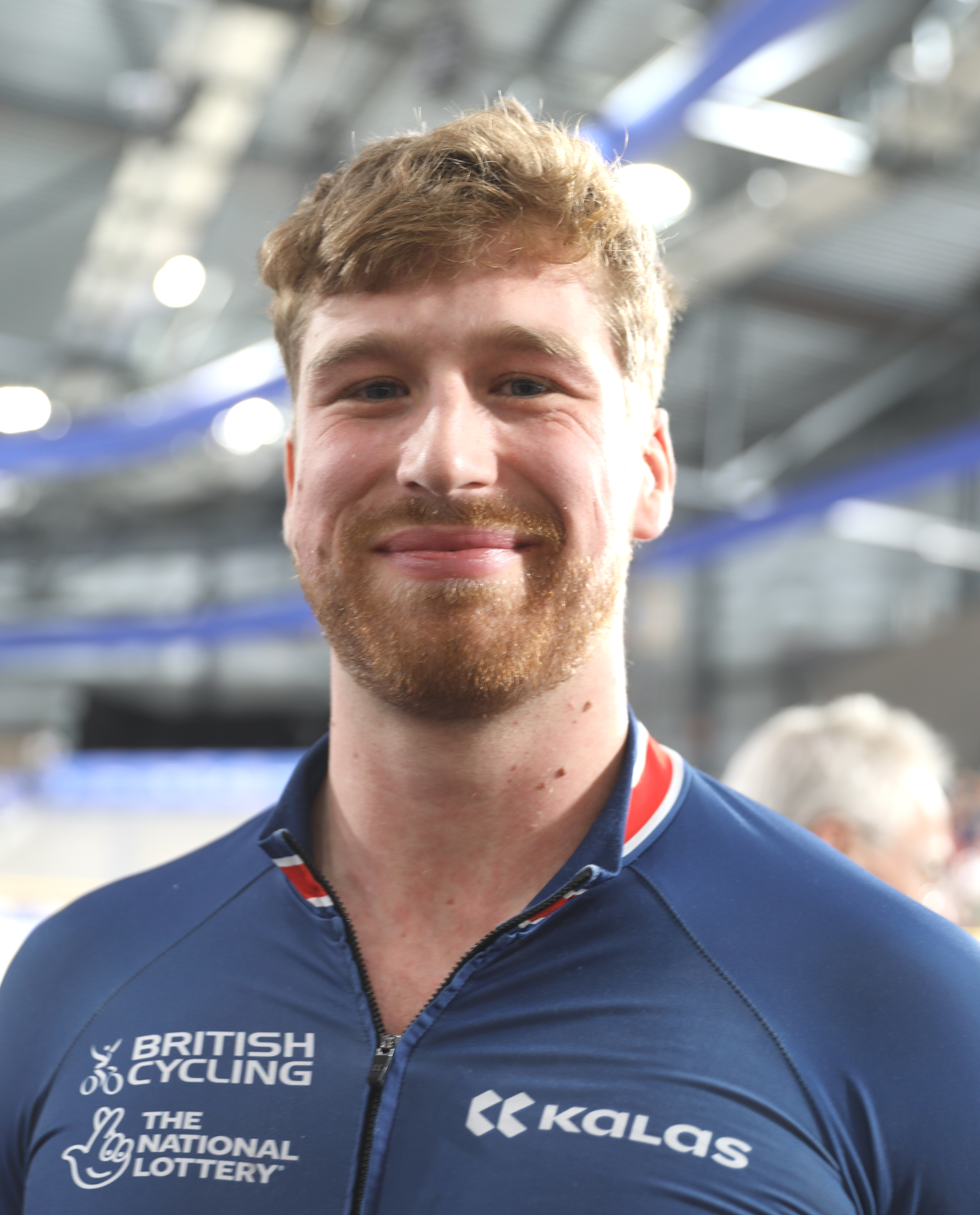
- Truman in 2024

Personal information
- Full name: Joseph Truman
- Born: 14 February 1997 (age 29) Petersfield, England
- Height: 188 cm (6 ft 2 in)
- Weight: 92 kg (203 lb)

Cycling career
- Sport: Cycling
- Current team: Team Inspired
- Discipline: Track cycling
- Role: Sprinter
Medal record
Men's track cycling
Representing Great Britain
World Championships
| Silver medal – second place | 2018 Apeldoorn | Team sprint |
| Silver medal – second place | 2025 Santiago | Team sprint |
| Bronze medal – third place | 2024 Ballerup | 1 km time trial |
| Bronze medal – third place | 2025 Santiago | 1 km time trial |
| Bronze medal – third place | 2026 Shanghai | 1 km time trial |
European Games
| Bronze medal – third place | 2019 Minsk | Team sprint |
European Championships
| Gold medal – first place | 2026 Konya | 1 km time trial |
| Silver medal – second place | 2016 Yvelines | Team sprint |
| Silver medal – second place | 2023 Grenchen | Team sprint |
Representing England
Commonwealth Games
| Silver medal – second place | 2018 Gold Coast | Team sprint |
| Silver medal – second place | 2022 Birmingham | Team sprint |
| Silver medal – second place | 2026 Glasgow | Team sprint |
| Silver medal – second place | 2026 Glasgow | 1 km time trial |

Joseph Truman (born 14 February 1997) is a British professional track cyclist. His first major medal came at the 2016 UEC European Track Championships in the team sprint, while his first major individual championship gold came ten years later in the kilo time trial at the 2026 UEC European Track Cycling Championships.

At the 2018 Commonwealth Games, Truman won Silver in the team sprint event alongside Ryan Owens and Philip Hindes.

Truman participated in two seasons (2018/19 and 2019/20) of the 'JKA' Japanese Keirin racing series, a hugely popular, multi-million dollar gambling sport. A BBC documentary, 'The Secret World of Japanese Bicycle Racing: with Sir Chris Hoy' aired detailing the sport and following Truman's experiences while competing in Japan.

Truman is multiple British champion, including winning the Keirin Championship at the 2020 British National Track Championships. He had finished second in 2019. At the 2022 British National Track Championships in Newport, Wales he won another British title after winning the team sprint. He also won two silver medals at the same Championships.

Truman won Silver at the Birmingham 2022 Commonwealth Games in the Team Sprint. His Commonwealth Games ended early after a crash in the Keirin on day two of competition.

Truman holds the British record for the Kilometre Time Trial with a time of 58.667. This time was set during the UCI World Championships where Truman achieved 3rd place in the event.

At the 2025 Track Cycling World Championships in Santiago, Truman, along with teammates Matthew Richardson, Hamish Turnbull and Harry Ledingham-Horn, claimed a silver medal in the team sprint for Great Britain.

At the 2026 Commonwealth Games in Glasgow, Truman, Turnbull and Ledingham-Horn won silver in the team sprint. The English trio were defeated by Australia in the gold medal race. Later in the competition, he won a second silver medal in the 1 km time trial.

He won a world championships bronze medal in the 1 km time trial for the third consecutive year at the 2026 UCI Track Cycling World Championships.

== Major results ==
2016
Track Cycling World Cup

1st Team sprint, Round 1 (Glasgow)
1st Team sprint, Round 2 (Apeldoorn)

2nd Team sprint, UEC European Track Championships

2017
British National Track Championships

1st Team sprint
2nd Individual Sprint

UCI Track Cycling World Cup

3rd Team Sprint, Round 1 (Pruszków)

2018
2018 British National Track Championships

1st Kilometre Time Trial
2nd Keirin

UCI Track Cycling World Championships

2nd Team Sprint

2018 Commonwealth Games

2nd Team Sprint

UCI Track Cycling World Cup

2nd Team Sprint, Round 2 (Berlin)
2nd Team Sprint, Round 4 (London)

2019
2019 British National Track Championships

1st Individual Sprint
3rd Keirin

3rd Team sprint, European Games

2020
British National Track Championships

1st Team sprint
1st Keirin

2022
Commonwealth Games

2nd Team Sprint

2023
2nd Team sprint, UEC European Championships

2024
3rd 1 km time trial, UCI World Championships

2025
2nd Team sprint, UCI World Championships (with Harry Ledingham-Horn, Hamish Turnbull and Matthew Richardson)

2026
2nd Team sprint, Commonwealth Games
