= Daniel Barber (cyclist) =

Australian racing cyclist (born 2003)

Personal information
- Born: 3 March 2003 (age 23) Dubbo, New South Wales, Australia
- Height: 6 ft 2 in (188 cm)
- Weight: 93 kg (205 lb)

Cycling career
- Sport: Cycling
- Discipline: Track
- Role: Rider
- Rider type: Sprint

Major wins
- 2025 Australian elite men's kierin champion 2025 Oceania team sprint champion 2024 Oceania team sprint champion
Medal record
Men's track cycling
Representing Australia
World Championships
Silver medal – second place	2026 Shanghai	Team sprint
Bronze medal – third place	2025 Santiago	Team sprint
Commonwealth Games
Gold medal – first place	2026 Glasgow	Team sprint

Daniel Barber (born 3 March 2003) is an Australian track cyclist who competes in sprinting events. As part of the Men's Team Sprint he won a gold meda l for Australia at the 2026 Glasgow Commonwealth Games. He won a bronze medal in the team sprint at the 2025 UCI Track World Championships and 2025 UCI Track Cycling Nations Cup. He was the 2025 Australian elite men's keirin champion.

== Career ==
From Dubbo in New South Wales, Barber rode as a junior cyclist winning many U15 and U17 titles. He set an Australian flying 200m record for an U17 rider of 10.724 seconds at the 2019 Australian Junior Track National Championships. In the same year he rode as an U19 cyclist at the Oceania Track Cycling Championships in Invercargill, New Zealand where he won the Oceania U19 sprint and keirin titles.

In 2021 he won three gold medals as an U19 at the National Track Championships, and recorded a championship record flying 200m time of 10.254 seconds.

In the 2024/2025 season he won the UCI C1 event in Melbourne, Australia. In the 2025 Oceania Track Championships, he took gold as part of the Australian men's team sprint team, was second in the individual sprint, and third in the keirin.

At the 2025 UCI Track Cycling Nation Cup in Turkey, he took bronze as part of the Australian men's team sprint team, finished fifth in the individual sprint with a qualifying time of 9.381 seconds and finished sixth in the keirin event.

At the 2025 UCI Track World Championships in Chile, he took bronze as part of the Australian men's team sprint team. He also finished ninth in the men's Sprint Event.

At the 2025 Australian Track National Championships he took his first elite individual national title, winning gold in the elite men's keirin.

At the 2026 Glasgow Commonwealth Games Barber claimed a Gold Medal as part of the Australian Team in the Mens Team Sprint event.
