= Peñalolén Velodrome =

Indoor cycling track in Chile

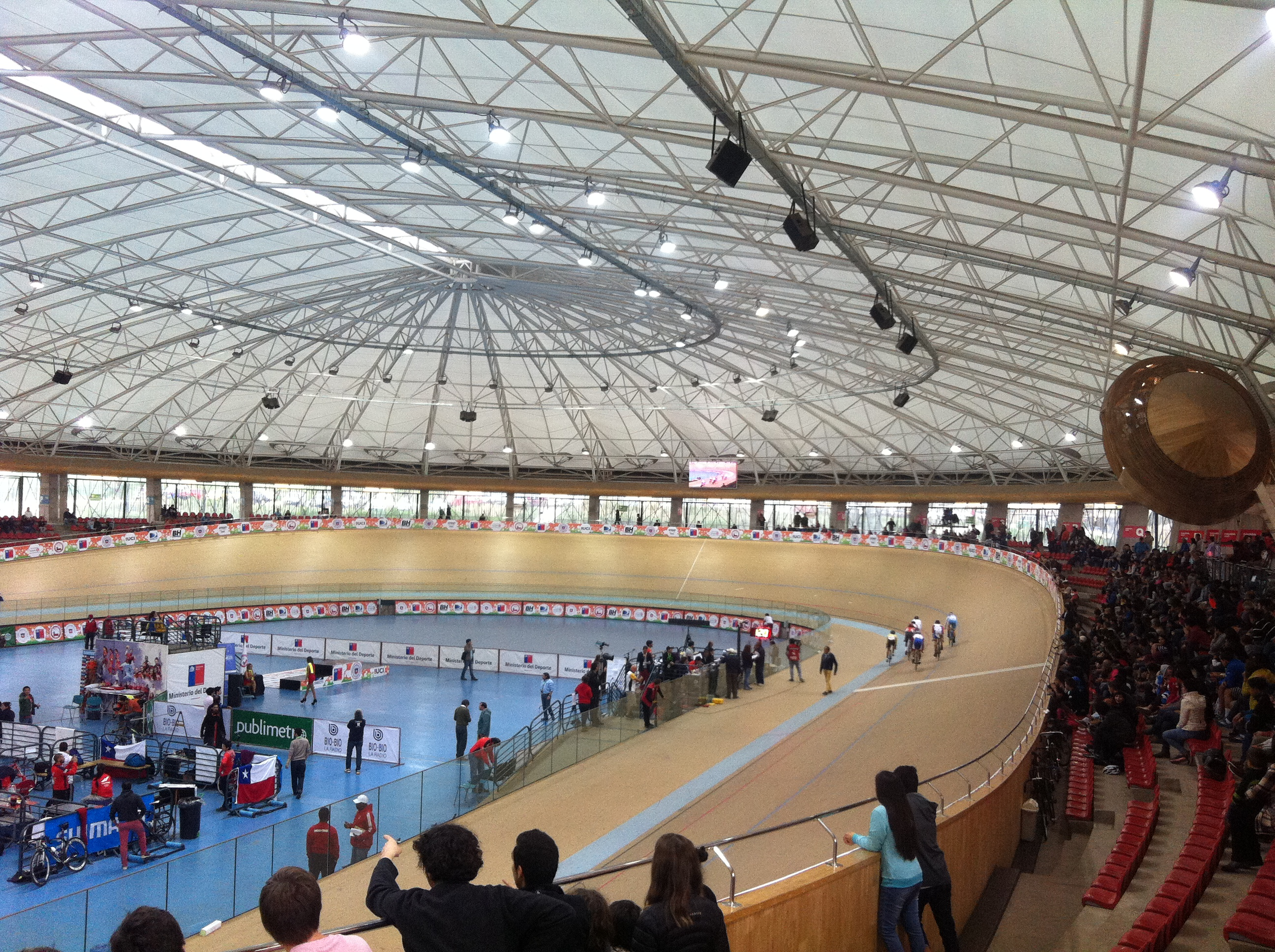
- Interior view of the velodrome
- Interactive map of Peñalolén Velodrome
- Location: Chile Santiago, Chile

Construction
- Opened: March 1, 2014
- Cost: US$18 million
- Architect: Iglesis Prat Arquitectos
- General contractor: ICAFAL

The Peñalolén Velodrome, also known as the Santiago Velodrome, is an indoor cycling track located within Peñalolén Park in the Peñalolén district of Santiago, Chile. It opened in March 2014 as one of the venues built for the 2014 South American Games.

== Events ==
- March 2014: Track cycling events for the 2014 South American Games.
- September 1–6, 2015: The 2015 Pan American Track Cycling Championships.
- December 8–10, 2017: The fourth round of the 2017–18 UCI Track Cycling World Cup.
- 2023: It was a venue for the 2023 Pan American Games.
- October 22–26, 2025: The 2025 UCI Track Cycling World Championships.
- February 16–22, 2026: The 2026 Pan American Track Cycling Championships.
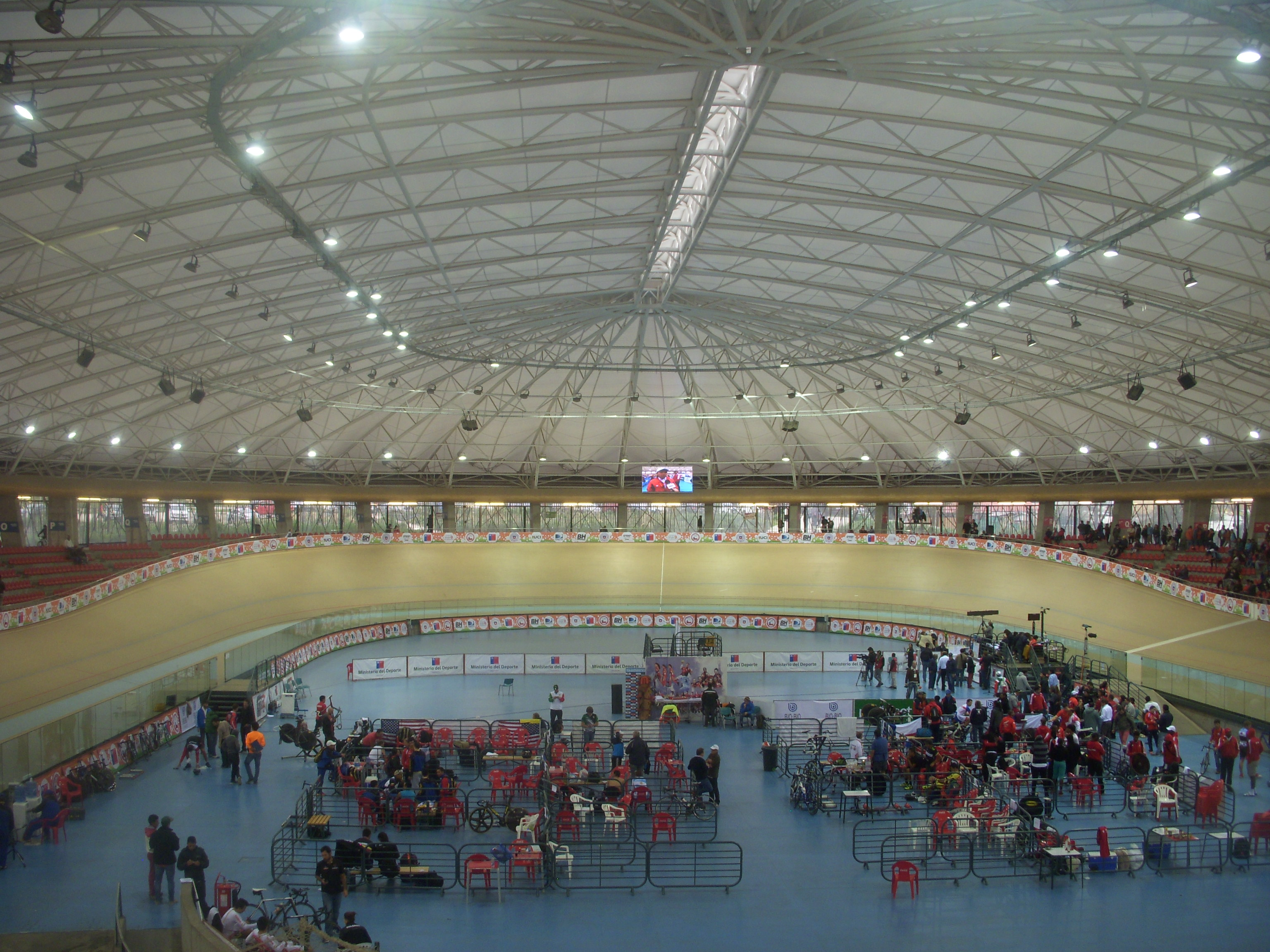

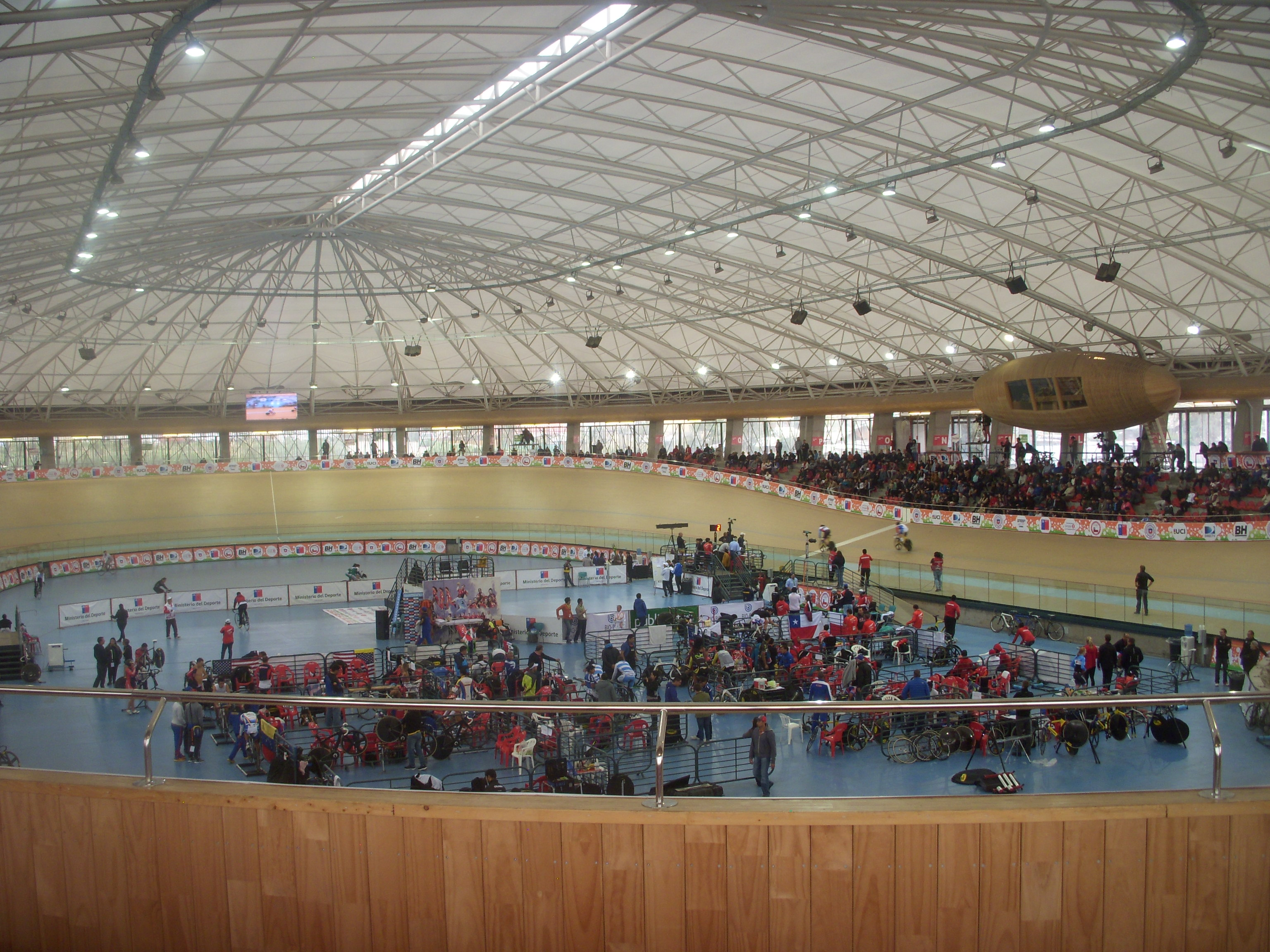
