= Matthew Richardson (cyclist) =

British-Australian cyclist (born 1999)

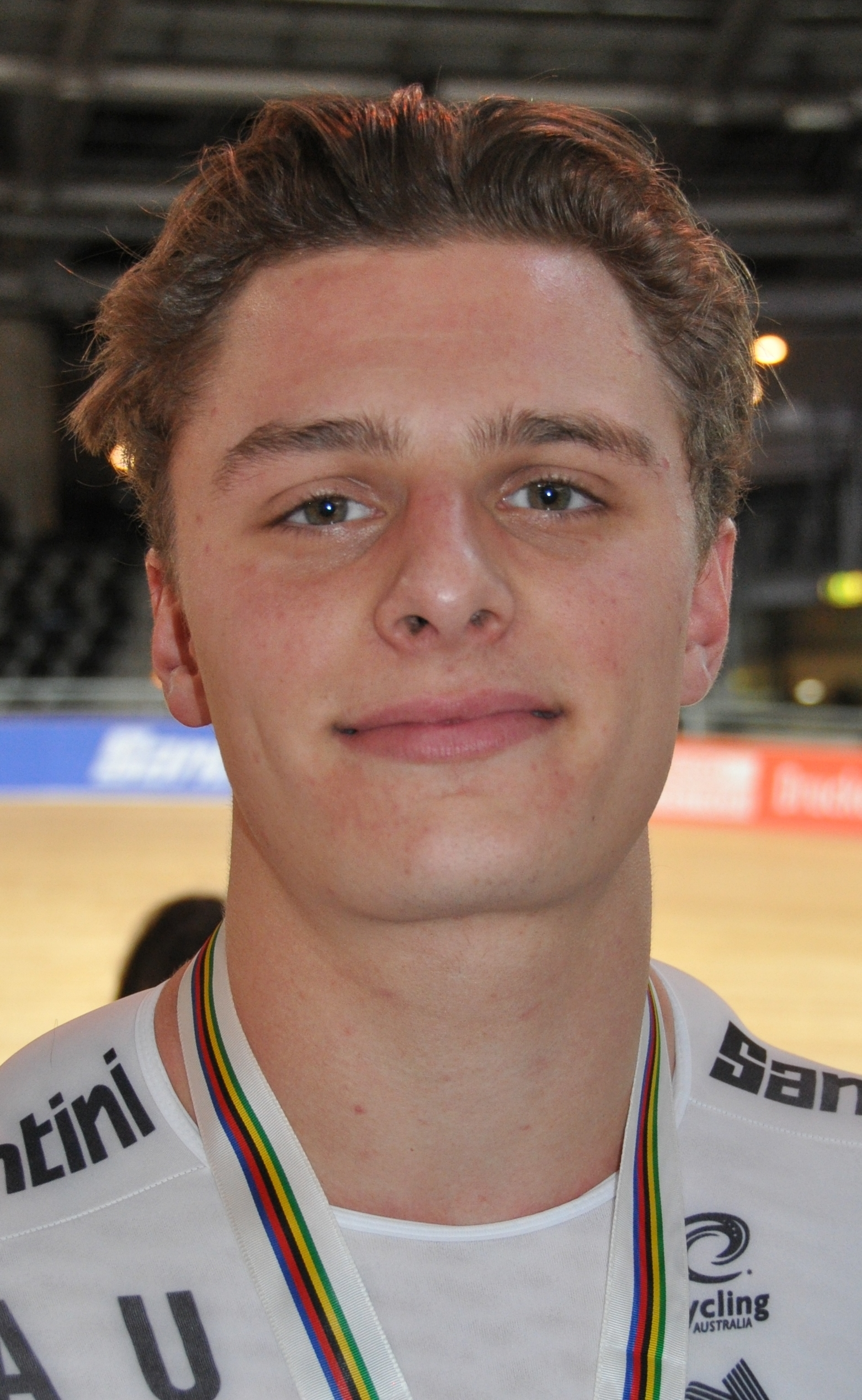
- Richardson in 2020

Personal information
- Born: 17 April 1999 (age 27) Maidstone, Kent, England
- Height: 173 cm (5 ft 8 in)
- Weight: 71 kg (157 lb)

Cycling career
- Sport: Cycling
- Discipline: Track
- Role: Rider
Medal record
Men's track cycling
Representing Great Britain
World Championships
Silver medal – second place	2025 Santiago	Team sprint
Silver medal – second place	2025 Santiago	Sprint
European Championships
Gold medal – first place	2026 Konya	Sprint
Gold medal – first place	2026 Konya	Keirin
Silver medal – second place	2026 Konya	Team sprint
Representing Australia
Olympic Games
Silver medal – second place	2024 Paris	Sprint
Silver medal – second place	2024 Paris	Keirin
Bronze medal – third place	2024 Paris	Team sprint
World Championships
Bronze medal – third place	2020 Berlin	Team sprint
Gold medal – first place	2022 Saint-Quentin-en-Yvelines	Team sprint
Silver medal – second place	2022 Saint-Quentin-en-Yvelines	Sprint
Silver medal – second place	2023 Glasgow	Team sprint
Silver medal – second place	2023 Glasgow	Keirin
Commonwealth Games
Gold medal – first place	2022 Birmingham	Team sprint
Gold medal – first place	2022 Birmingham	Sprint

Matthew Richardson (born 17 April 1999) is a track cyclist who represented Australia until August 2024 and Great Britain from September 2024 onwards. Representing Australia, he won world title gold in the team sprint in 2022, two gold medals at the 2022 Commonwealth Games, and three Olympic medals—two silver and one bronze—at the 2024 Summer Olympics in Paris.

Richardson made his Olympic debut at the 2020 Summer Olympics in Tokyo, competing in the keirin, individual sprint, and team sprint. He competed in the same three events at the 2024 Olympics, claiming silver medals in both the sprint and keirin behind Dutch rider Harrie Lavreysen, alongside a bronze medal in the team sprint.

Following the 2024 Paris Olympics, Richardson switched his international allegiance to Great Britain, his nation of birth. In August 2025, he broke the world record in the men's flying 200 m time trial, becoming the first rider to clear the distance in under nine seconds. At the 2026 UEC European Track Championships, he won gold medals in both the sprint and keirin, defeating his long-time rival Lavreysen in both finals and ending the Dutchman's seven-year unbeaten streak in individual sprint competitions at major championships.

== Early life ==
Richardson was born in Maidstone, Kent, England, to English parents and relocated to Australia for his father's work when he was nine years old. He grew up in Maidstone and later in the Perth suburb of Warwick, Western Australia. Due to his parentage and long-term residence, he holds dual British and Australian citizenship.

As a teenager, Richardson competed in gymnastics, earning podium finishes at the national level. Following an elbow injury, he transitioned from gymnastics to competitive cycling.

== Career ==
=== Representing Australia ===
Richardson began cycling with the Midland Cycling Club in Perth. After attending a talent identification session, he was recruited to train with the Western Australian Institute of Sport.

Three months prior to the 2019 World Championships, Richardson relocated to South Australia to join Cycling Australia's Podium Potential Academy. Shortly afterwards, he was selected to represent Australia in the team sprint at the 2019 World Championships in Pruszków, Poland. The Australian team finished in sixth position, missing out on the medal rounds after being eliminated by eventual silver medallists France.

At the 2020 UCI Track Cycling World Championships in Berlin, Richardson won a bronze medal in the team sprint alongside Thomas Cornish and Nathan Hart. The result marked Australia's highest finish in the event at a World Championships in eight years. At the delayed 2020 Summer Olympics in Tokyo, his highest finish came in the team sprint, where Australia placed fourth.

Richardson competed at the 2022 Commonwealth Games in Birmingham, where he won gold medals in the team sprint alongside Leigh Hoffman and Matthew Glaetzer, as well as in the individual sprint.

At the 2022 UCI Track Cycling World Championships in Saint-Quentin-en-Yvelines, France, Richardson became a senior world champion, winning gold in the team sprint alongside Hoffman and Glaetzer as the Australian trio ended the Netherlands' four-year reign in the discipline. He also claimed the silver medal in the individual sprint, finishing behind Harrie Lavreysen. Later that season, he won the overall sprint category in the 2022 UCI Track Champions League, defeating Lavreysen across five rounds of competition. At the 2023 UCI Track Cycling World Championships in Glasgow, Scotland, Richardson secured two silver medals: in the team sprint and in the keirin, where he finished second to Colombia's Kevin Quintero.

At the Paris 2024 Olympics, Richardson won three medals for Australia: two silvers in the keirin and the sprint, and a bronze in the team sprint. Despite representing Australia, it was later revealed that Richardson had entered prior discussions to join the Great Britain Cycling Team immediately following the Games.

=== Representing Great Britain ===
On 19 August 2024, following the conclusion of the Olympics, it was announced that Richardson would leave the Australian cycling setup to represent Great Britain after his application to switch national allegiance was ratified by the Union Cycliste Internationale (UCI). The transfer generated controversy within the Australian cycling community. Initial reports indicated that AusCycling was exploring whether it could enforce a two-year non-competition clause on Richardson, which would have sidelined him from international track cycling until 2026. However, in November 2024, AusCycling issued a statement confirming they would not pursue a ban, stating that such an exclusion period was legally unenforceable.

Richardson made his debut in British colours at the 2024 UCI Track Champions League. At the opening round in Paris, he won both the sprint and the keirin, defeating Lavreysen in both events to collect maximum points. At the conclusion of the five-round series, he finished second overall in the standings, 20 points behind Lavreysen.

In February 2025, Richardson competed at his first British National Track Championships. He secured his first British title in the individual sprint, defeating reigning champion Peter Mitchell in the gold medal match. He also claimed gold in the team sprint alongside Lyall Craig, Niall Monks, and Harry Ledingham-Horn. He completed a clean sweep of the national sprint disciplines by winning the keirin title on the final day of the championships.

Richardson's first international appearance for Great Britain came at the 2025 Nations Cup in Konya, Turkey, where he won gold in both the individual sprint and the team sprint alongside Ledingham-Horn and Harry Radford.

On 5 August 2025, British Cycling announced that Richardson would make an official attempt on the men's flying 200 m time trial world record in Konya on 14 August. He succeeded on his first day of testing, becoming the first cyclist in history to break the nine-second barrier with a time of 8.941 seconds. He returned the following afternoon and bettered his own mark, setting a new world record of 8.857 seconds.

At the 2025 Track Cycling World Championships in Santiago, Richardson won a silver medal in the team sprint alongside Ledingham-Horn, Hamish Turnbull, and Joseph Truman. In the keirin, he was eliminated in the quarter-finals, placing 16th overall. In the individual sprint, Richardson qualified fastest and advanced to the gold medal final by defeating Nick Wammes, Kaiya Ota, and former teammate Hoffman in the intermediate rounds. In the final, he was defeated in straight rides by defending champion Lavreysen, finishing with the silver medal.

At the 2026 European Championships in Konya, Richardson became the first British man to win the European individual sprint title, defeating Lavreysen in a deciding heat in the gold medal match. The following day, he captured his second European title in the keirin. After winning his qualifying and semi-final heats, he launched a late acceleration in the final to take gold by 0.033 seconds ahead of silver medallist Lavreysen.

In October 2026, Richardson was unexpectedly withdrawn from the Great Britain Cycling Team squad for the forthcoming UCI Track Cycling World Championships in Shanghai. The Times reported on October 13 that this was due to allegations of serious misconduct, including the use of discriminatory language about minority groups in conversations with other riders.

== Personal life ==
Richardson is in a relationship with fellow British world and Olympic track cycling champion Emma Finucane.

== See also ==
- List of World Championship medalists in men's sprint
- List of World Championship medalists in men's keirin
- List of World Championship medalists in men's team sprint
- List of Track Cycling Nations Cup medalists
