= Sam Dakin =

New Zealand cyclist (born 1996)

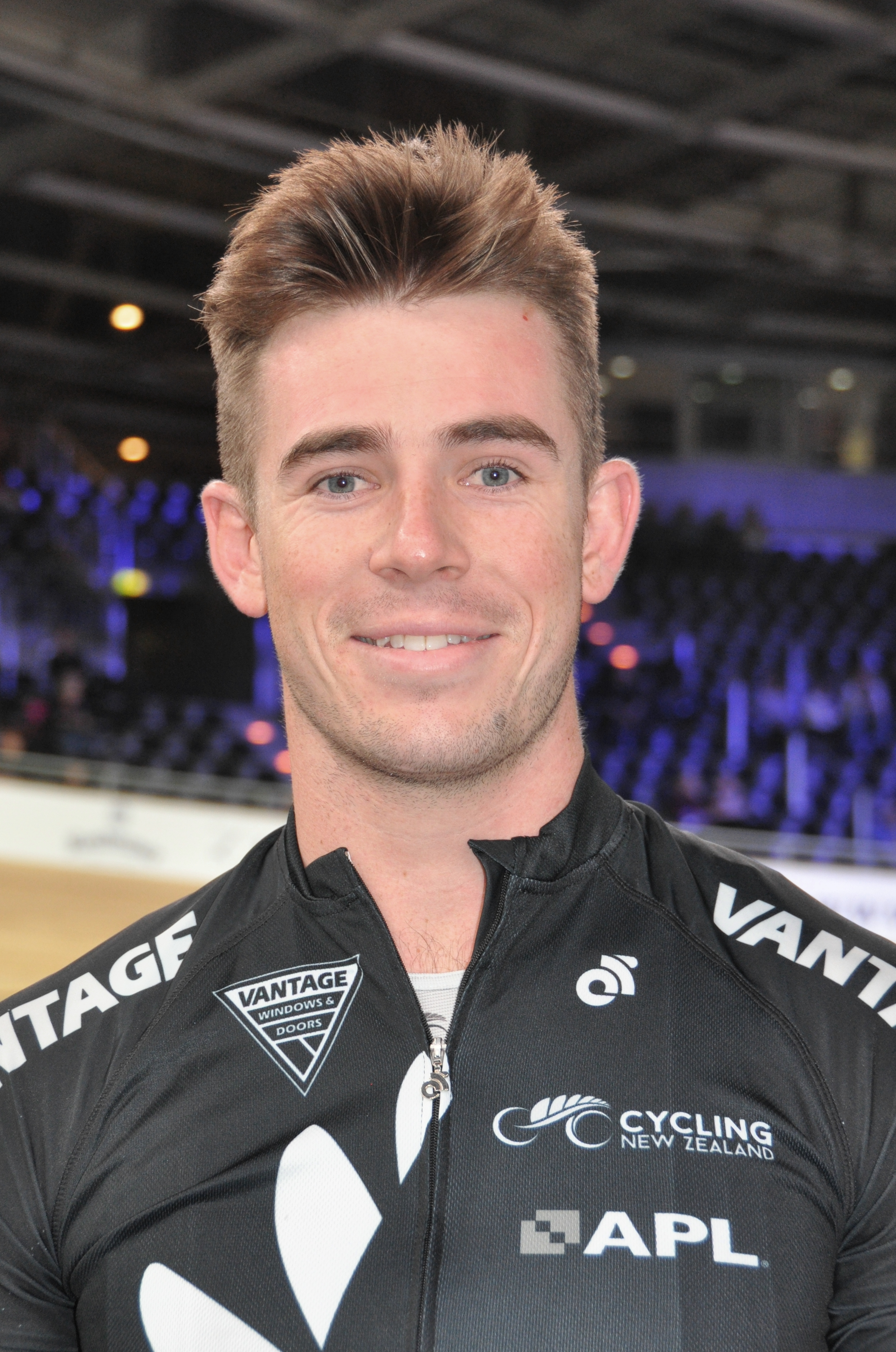
- Dakin at the 2020 UCI Track Cycling World Championships

Personal information
- Full name: Samuel Dakin
- Born: 4 September 1996 (age 30) Auckland, New Zealand
- Height: 182 cm (6 ft 0 in)

Cycling career
- Sport: Cycling
- Discipline: Track
- Role: Rider
- Rider type: Sprinter
Medal record
Men's track cycling
Representing New Zealand
Commonwealth Games
Bronze medal – third place	2022 Birmingham	Team sprint

Samuel Dakin OLY (born 4 September 1996) is a New Zealand track cyclist, who competes in sprinting events.

Born in Auckland, Dakin completed a Bachelor of Business Analysis with a major in finance in Waikato and also completed a Post Graduate Diploma in Innovation and entrepreneurship in 2020 online through Harvard University. His training base is the Avantidrome in Cambridge as part of the New Zealand High Performance Squad. He was selected for the New Zealand Olympic team for the 2020 Summer Olympics in Tokyo. Dakin competed in the team sprint event following the retirement of Eddie Dawkins, joining three-time World Champions and Rio 2016 silver medalists, Ethan Mitchell and Sam Webster.

Dakin competed in Birmingham, England at the 2022 Commonwealth Games, and was a team sprint bronze medallist. He also competed at the 2024 Olympic Games in Paris. Dakin announced his intention to retire from elite level track cycling at the conclusion of the 2026 season and competed for New Zealand at the 2026 Commonwealth Games.
