= Luca Spiegel =

German cyclist (born 2004)

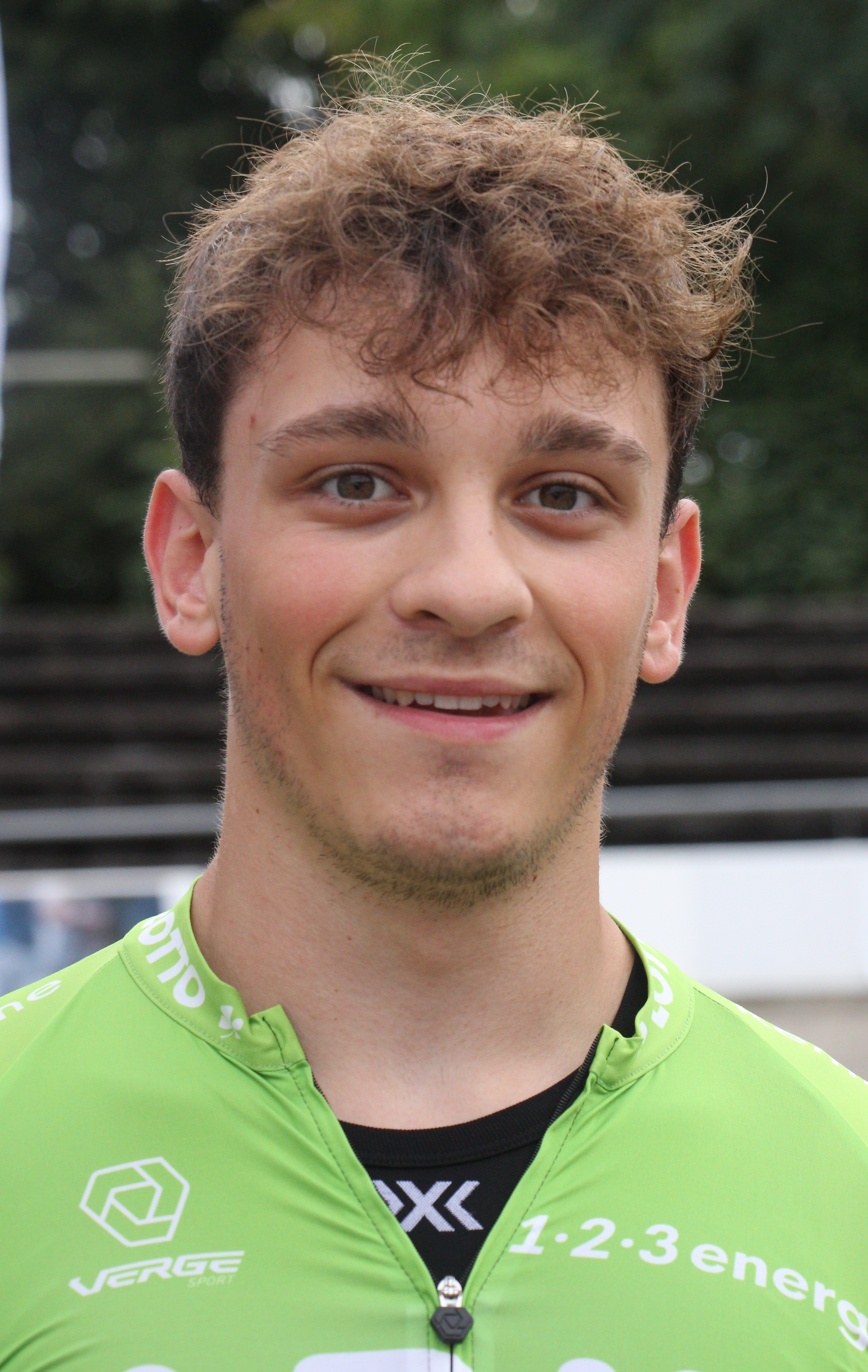
- Spiegel in 2023

Personal information
- Born: 23 April 2004 (age 22) Mannheim, Germany

Cycling career
- Sport: Cycling
- Discipline: Track
- Role: Rider
- Rider type: Sprinter
Medal record
Representing Germany
Men's track cycling
World Junior Championships
| Silver medal – second place | 2021 Cairo | Team sprint |
| Silver medal – second place | 2022 Tel Aviv | Team sprint |
| Bronze medal – third place | 2022 Tel Aviv | Sprint |

Luca Spiegel (born 23 April 2004) is a German track cyclist.

== Early life ==
He is from Kaiserslautern. He attended Kaiserslautern Heinrich-Heine-Gymnasium (HHG).

== Career ==
He won silver in the team sprint at the 2021 UCI Junior Track Cycling World Championships in Cairo. He won bronze in the sprint and silver in the team sprint at the 2022 UCI Junior Track Cycling World Championships in Tel Aviv.

He was called-up to the German side for the men's team sprint at the 2023 UEC European Track Championships in Switzerland as a replacement for Stefan Bötticher. He won the bronze medal at the 2023 UEC European Track Championships in Anadia, Portugal with the German sprint team in July 2023.

In August 2023, he competed for senior Germany team at the 2023 UCI Track Cycling World Championships in Glasgow in the men's team sprint. He also took part in the team sprint 2024 UEC European Track Championships, where they placed fifth in both. In the men's sprint at the European Championships in Appeldoorn, where he reached the last 16, losing to Jeffrey Hoogland.

He was selected for the 2024 Paris Olympics.
