= James Hedgcock =

Canadian track cyclist (born 2001)

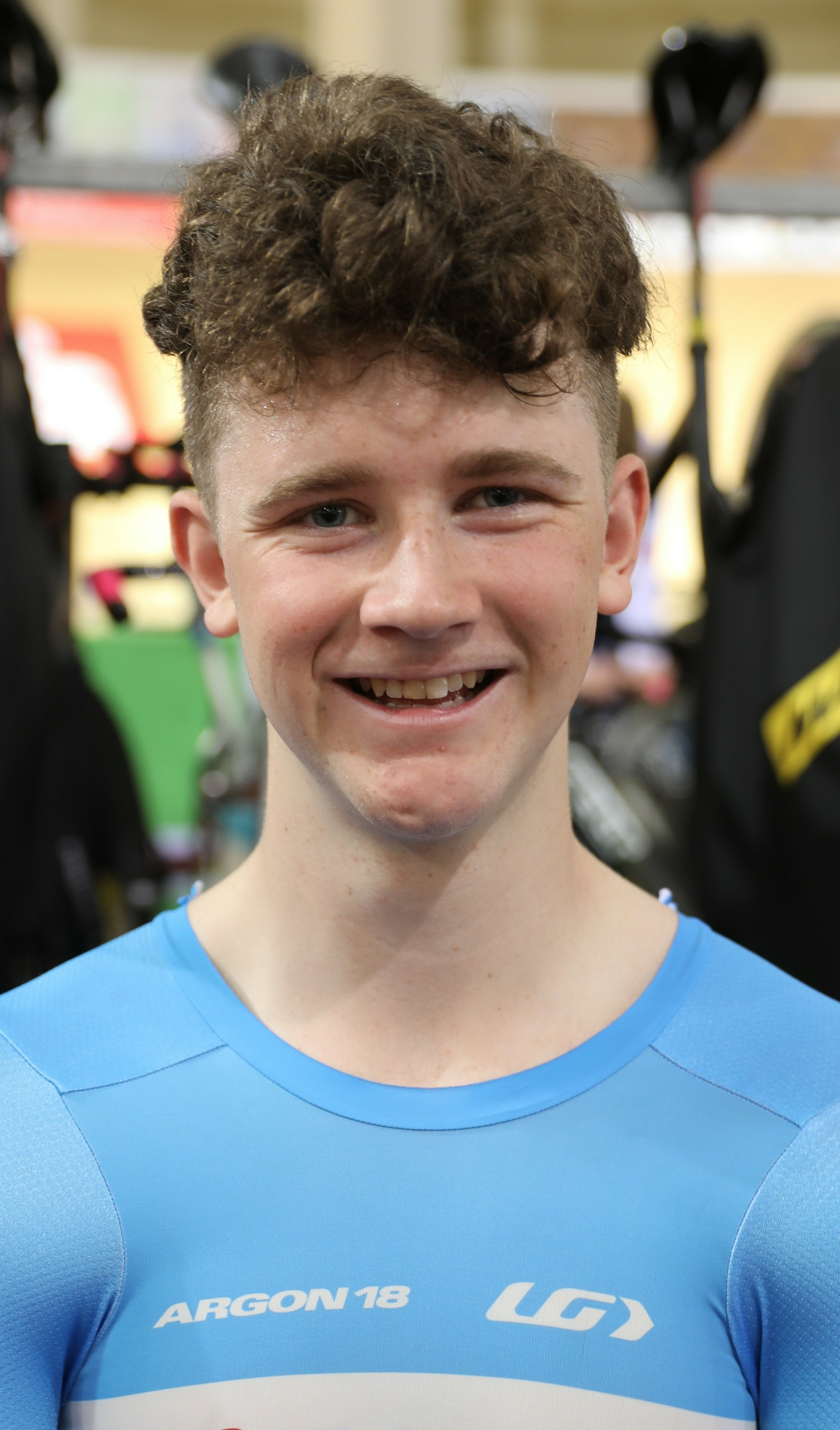
- Hedgcock in 2019

Personal information
- Full name: James Cole Hedgcock
- Born: November 15, 2001 (age 24) Ancaster, Ontario, Canada

Cycling career
- Sport: Cycling
- Discipline: Track
- Role: RIder
- Rider type: Sprinter
Medal record
Men's track cycling
Representing Canada
Pan American Games
Gold medal – first place	2023 Santiago	Team sprint
Pan American Championships
Gold medal – first place	2023 San Juan	Team sprint
Gold medal – first place	2026 Santiago	Team sprint
Silver medal – second place	2024 Los Angeles	Team sprint
Bronze medal – third place	2022 Lima	1 km time trial
Bronze medal – third place	2023 San Juan	1 km time trial
Bronze medal – third place	2025 Asunción	1 km time trial
Bronze medal – third place	2026 Santiago	1 km time trial

James Cole Hedgcock (born November 15, 2001) is a Canadian track cyclist competing in the sprint events. Hedgcock has won multiple medals in the team sprint and 1 km time trial events at the Pan American level.

== Career ==
Hedgcock made his senior team debut at the 2022 Commonwealth Games. At the 2023 Pan American Games, Hedgcock won gold in the team sprint event. Hedgcock has won two medals in the team sprint event at the Pan American Track Cycling Championships, gold in 2023, with silver in 2022.

In June 2024, Hedgcock was named to Canada's Olympic team. This marks Hedgcock's first appearance at the Olympics.
