= 2026 UCI Track Cycling World Championships – Men's keirin =

Men's keirin at the 2026 UCI Track Cycling World Championships
- Venue: Shanghai Velodrome
- Location: Shanghai, China
- Dates: 15 October
- Competitors: 34 from 21 nations

Medalists
gold medal	Harrie Lavreysen	Netherlands
silver medal	Maximilian Dörnbach	Germany
bronze medal	Shinji Nakano	Japan

The Men's keirin competition at the 2026 UCI Track Cycling World Championships was held on 15 October 2026.

== Results ==
=== First round ===
The first round was started at 12:00. The first two riders from each heat qualified for the quarterfinals, all other riders moved to the repechages.

Heat 1

Rank	Name	Nation	Gap	Notes
1	Harrie Lavreysen	Netherlands		Q
2	Mateusz Rudyk	Poland	+0.127	Q
3	Li Zhiwei	China	+0.138	
4	Lowie Nulens	Belgium	+0.251	
5	Ryan Elliott	Australia	+0.275	
6	Nikita Kalachnik	Individual Neutral Athletes	+0.323	
7	Henric Hackmann	Germany	+3.167	

Heat 2

Rank	Name	Nation	Gap	Notes
1	Daniel Barber	Australia		Q
2	Jeffrey Hoogland	Netherlands	+2.154	Q
3	Nicholas Paul	Trinidad and Tobago	+2.174	
4	Shinji Nakano	Japan	+2.218	
5	Nikita Kiriltsev	Individual Neutral Athletes	+2.255	
6	Liu Qi	China	+2.284	
7	Mikhail Iakovlev	Israel	+3.263	

Heat 3

Rank	Name	Nation	Gap	Notes
1	Maximilian Dörnbach	Germany		Q
2	Sándor Szalontay	Hungary	+0.165	Q
3	Harry Ledingham-Horn	Great Britain	+0.243	
4	Leigh Hoffman	Australia	+0.278	
5	Rayan Helal	France	+0.321	
6	Xie Han	China	+0.497	
7	Njisane Phillip	Trinidad and Tobago	+0.504	

Heat 4

Rank	Name	Nation	Gap	Notes
1	Kaiya Ota	Japan		Q
2	Azizulhasni Awang	Malaysia	+0.006	Q
3	Kwesi Browne	Trinidad and Tobago	+0.301	
4	David Peterka	Czechia	+0.336	
5	Bohdan Danylchuk	Ukraine	+0.399	
6	Cristian Ortega	Colombia	+0.606	
7	James Hedgcock	Canada	+0.722	

Heat 5

Rank	Name	Nation	Gap	Notes
1	Tom Derache	France		Q
2	Dominik Topinka	Czechia	+0.124	Q
3	Lucas Vilar	Argentina	+0.244	
4	Kevin Quintero	Colombia	+0.291	
5	To Cheuk Hei	Hong Kong	+0.371	
6	Mattia Predomo	Italy	+1.922	

=== First round repechage ===
The first round repechage was started at 13:18. The first two riders from each heat qualified for the quarterfinals.

Heat 1

Rank	Name	Nation	Gap	Notes
1	Xie Han	China		Q
2	Nikita Kalachnik	Individual Neutral Athletes	+0.124	Q
3	Kwesi Browne	Trinidad and Tobago	+0.179	
4	David Peterka	Czechia	+0.287	
5	Kevin Quintero	Colombia	+0.619	
6	Henric Hackmann	Germany	+1.618	

Heat 3

Rank	Name	Nation	Gap	Notes
1	Shinji Nakano	Japan		Q
2	Li Zhiwei	China	+0.036	Q
3	Ryan Elliott	Australia	+0.058	
4	Harry Ledingham-Horn	Great Britain	+0.116	
5	Bohdan Danylchuk	Ukraine	+0.565	
6	James Hedgcock	Canada	+0.808	

Heat 2

Rank	Name	Nation	Gap	Notes
1	Leigh Hoffman	Australia		Q
2	Cristian Ortega	Colombia	+0.054	Q
3	To Cheuk Hei	Hong Kong	+0.344	
4	Lowie Nulens	Belgium	+0.393	
5	Mikhail Iakovlev	Israel	+0.443	
6	Nicholas Paul	Trinidad and Tobago	+0.668	

Heat 4

Rank	Name	Nation	Gap	Notes
1	Rayan Helal	France		Q
2	Nikita Kiriltsev	Individual Neutral Athletes	+0.055	Q
3	Liu Qi	China	+0.071	
4	Lucas Vilar	Argentina	+0.118	
5	Njisane Phillip	Trinidad and Tobago	+0.139	
6	Mattia Predomo	Italy	+1.382	

=== Quarterfinals ===
The quarterfinals were started at 14:23. The first four riders from each heat qualified for the semifinals.

Heat 1

Rank	Name	Nation	Gap	Notes
1	Nikita Kiriltsev	Individual Neutral Athletes		Q
2	Rayan Helal	France	+0.029	Q
3	Shinji Nakano	Japan	+0.108	Q
4	Xie Han	China	+0.113	Q
5	Leigh Hoffman	Australia	+0.144	
6	Jeffrey Hoogland	Netherlands	+0.509	

Heat 2

Rank	Name	Nation	Gap	Notes
1	Kaiya Ota	Japan		Q
2	Harrie Lavreysen	Netherlands	+0.246	Q
3	Daniel Barber	Australia	+0.395	Q
4	Tom Derache	France	+0.436	Q
5	Li Zhiwei	China	+0.436	
6	Sándor Szalontay	Hungary	+0.849	

Heat 3

Rank	Name	Nation	Gap	Notes
1	Maximilian Dörnbach	Germany		Q
2	Cristian Ortega	Colombia	+0.014	Q
3	Dominik Topinka	Czechia	+0.086	Q
4	Mateusz Rudyk	Poland	+0.166	Q
5	Nikita Kalachnik	Individual Neutral Athletes	+0.173	
6	Azizulhasni Awang	Malaysia	+0.262	

=== Semifinals ===
The semifinals were started at 17:49. The first three riders in each heat qualified for the final, all other riders raced for places 7 to 12.

Heat 1

Rank	Name	Nation	Gap	Notes
1	Harrie Lavreysen	Netherlands		Q
2	Nikita Kiriltsev	Individual Neutral Athletes	+0.094	Q
3	Mateusz Rudyk	Poland	+0.094	Q
4	Rayan Helal	France	+0.175	
5	Dominik Topinka	Czechia	+0.183	
6	Daniel Barber	Australia	+0.302	

Heat 2

Rank	Name	Nation	Gap	Notes
1	Kaiya Ota	Japan		Q
2	Shinji Nakano	Japan	+0.311	Q
3	Maximilian Dörnbach	Germany	+0.390	Q
4	Tom Derache	France	+0.465	
5	Xie Han	China	+0.479	
6	Cristian Ortega	Colombia	+0.933	

=== Finals ===
The finals were started at 19:18.

Small final

Rank	Name	Nation	Gap
7	Daniel Barber	Australia	
8	Xie Han	China	+0.052
9	Tom Derache	France	+0.152
10	Rayan Helal	France	+0.156
11	Dominik Topinka	Czechia	+0.260
12	Cristian Ortega	Colombia	+0.789

Final

Rank	Name	Nation	Gap
1st place, gold medalist(s)	Harrie Lavreysen	Netherlands	
2nd place, silver medalist(s)	Maximilian Dörnbach	Germany	+0.068
3rd place, bronze medalist(s)	Shinji Nakano	Japan	+0.092
4	Kaiya Ota	Japan	+0.184
5	Mateusz Rudyk	Poland	+0.262
6	Nikita Kiriltsev	Individual Neutral Athletes	REL
