= 2026 UEC European Track Championships – Men's keirin =

Men's keirin at the 2026 UEC Track Elite European Championships
- Venue: Konya Velodrome, Konya
- Date: 5 February
- Competitors: 32

Medalists
gold medal	Matthew Richardson	Great Britain
silver medal	Harrie Lavreysen	Netherlands
bronze medal	Lowie Nulens	Belgium

The men's keirin competition at the 2026 UEC European Track Championships was held on 5 February 2026.

== Results ==
=== First round ===
The first rider in each heat qualified for the semifinals, and all other riders advanced to the first round repechages.

Heat 1

Rank	Name	Nation	Gap	Notes
1	Harrie Lavreysen	Netherlands		Q
2	Stefano Moro	Italy	+0.352	
3	Sándor Szalontay	Hungary	+0.417	
4	Eliasz Bednarek	Poland	+0.514	
5	Miltiadis Charovas	Greece	+0.634	

Heat 2

Rank	Name	Nation	Gap	Notes
1	Lowie Nulens	Belgium		Q
2	Vasilijus Lendel	Lithuania	+0.505	
3	Nikita Kalachnik	Individual Neutral Athletes	+0.632	
4	Valentyn Varharakyn	Ukraine	+1.022	
5	Mateusz Rudyk	Poland	+1.037	

Heat 3

Rank	Name	Nation	Gap	Notes
1	Tom Derache	France		Q
2	Harry Ledingham-Horn	Great Britain	+0.042	
3	Dominik Topinka	Czech Republic	+0.272	
4	Alejandro Martínez	Spain	+0.617	
5	Patrik Rómeó Lovassy	Hungary	+3.649	

Heat 4

Rank	Name	Nation	Gap	Notes
1	Luca Spiegel	Germany		Q
2	Bohdan Danylchuk	Ukraine	+0.040	
3	Artsiom Zaitsau	Individual Neutral Athletes	+0.356	
4	Konstantinos Livanos	Greece	+0.770	
5	Miroslav Minchev	Bulgaria	+1.227	
6	Esteban Sánchez	Spain	+1.513	

Heat 5

Rank	Name	Nation	Gap	Notes
1	Matthew Richardson	Great Britain		Q
2	Nikita Kiriltsev	Individual Neutral Athletes	+0.456	
3	David Peterka	Czech Republic	+0.645	
4	Yeno Vingerhoets	Belgium	+1.274	
5	Tim Edvard Pettersen	Norway	+1.569	
6	Pavel Nikolov	Bulgaria	+4.078	

Heat 6

Rank	Name	Nation	Gap	Notes
1	Rayan Helal	France		Q
2	Loris Leneman	Netherlands	+0.176	
3	Mattia Predomo	Italy	+0.240	
4	Aliaksandr Hlova	Individual Neutral Athletes	+0.528	
5	Eimantas Vadapalas	Lithuania	+1.079	
	Maximilian Dörnbach	Germany	DNS	

=== Repechage ===
The first rider in each heat qualified for the semifinals.

Heat 1

Rank	Name	Nation	Gap	Notes
1	Tim Edvard Pettersen	Norway		Q
2	Stefano Moro	Italy	+0.056	
3	Sándor Szalontay	Hungary	+0.188	
4	Valentyn Varharakyn	Ukraine	+0.525	

Heat 2

Rank	Name	Nation	Gap	Notes
1	David Peterka	Czech Republic		Q
2	Vasilijus Lendel	Lithuania		
3	Esteban Sánchez	Spain	+0.049	
4	Aliaksandr Hlova	Individual Neutral Athletes	+0.114	
5	Eliasz Bednarek	Poland	+0.898	

Heat 3

Rank	Name	Nation	Gap	Notes
1	Harry Ledingham-Horn	Great Britain		Q
2	Artsiom Zaitsau	Individual Neutral Athletes	+0.062	
3	Yeno Vingerhoets	Belgium	+0.062	
4	Mateusz Rudyk	Poland	+1.154	

Heat 4

Rank	Name	Nation	Gap	Notes
1	Nikita Kalachnik	Individual Neutral Athletes		Q
2	Bohdan Danylchuk	Ukraine	+0.021	
3	Eimantas Vadapalas	Lithuania	+0.299	
4	Miltiadis Charovas	Greece	+0.592	

Heat 5

Rank	Name	Nation	Gap	Notes
1	Nikita Kiriltsev	Individual Neutral Athletes		Q
2	Alejandro Martínez	Spain	+0.058	
3	Dominik Topinka	Czech Republic	+0.290	
4	Miroslav Minchev	Bulgaria	+5.782	

Heat 6

Rank	Name	Nation	Gap	Notes
1	Patrik Rómeó Lovassy	Hungary		Q
2	Konstantinos Livanos	Greece	+0.112	
3	Loris Leneman	Netherlands	+0.445	
4	Pavel Nikolov	Bulgaria	+0.574	
5	Mattia Predomo	Italy	+1.586	

=== Semifinals ===
The first three riders in each heat qualified for the final, all other riders raced for places 7 to 12.

Heat 1

Rank	Name	Nation	Gap	Notes
1	Matthew Richardson	Great Britain		Q
2	Nikita Kalachnik	Individual Neutral Athletes	+0.364	Q
3	Harrie Lavreysen	Netherlands	+0.378	Q
4	Rayan Helal	France	+0.415	
5	David Peterka	Czech Republic	+0.455	
6	Patrik Rómeó Lovassy	Hungary	+1.061	

Heat 2

Rank	Name	Nation	Gap	Notes
1	Tom Derache	France		Q
2	Lowie Nulens	Belgium	+0.045	Q
3	Harry Ledingham-Horn	Great Britain	+0.114	Q
4	Nikita Kiriltsev	Individual Neutral Athletes	+0.144	
5	Tim Edvard Pettersen	Norway	+0.213	
6	Luca Spiegel	Germany	+0.377	

=== Finals ===
Small final

Rank	Name	Nation	Gap	Notes
7	Luca Spiegel	Germany		
8	Rayan Helal	France	+0.053	
9	David Peterka	Czech Republic	+0.066	
10	Patrik Rómeó Lovassy	Hungary	+0.110	
11	Nikita Kiriltsev	Individual Neutral Athletes	+0.178	
12	Tim Edvard Pettersen	Norway	+0.462	

Final

Rank	Name	Nation	Gap	Notes
1st place, gold medalist(s)	Matthew Richardson	Great Britain		
2nd place, silver medalist(s)	Harrie Lavreysen	Netherlands	+0.033	
3rd place, bronze medalist(s)	Lowie Nulens	Belgium	+0.071	
4	Nikita Kalachnik	Individual Neutral Athletes	+0.261	
5	Tom Derache	France	+0.515	
6	Harry Ledingham-Horn	Great Britain	+1.264	
