= 2026 UCI Track Cycling World Championships – Men's sprint =

Men's sprint at the 2026 UCI Track Cycling World Championships
- Venue: Shanghai Velodrome
- Location: Shanghai, China
- Dates: 17–18 October
- Competitors: 33 from 21 nations

Medalists
gold medal	Harrie Lavreysen	Netherlands
silver medal	Leigh Hoffman	Australia
bronze medal	Kaiya Ota	Japan

The Men's sprint competition at the 2026 UCI Track Cycling World Championships was held on 17 and 18 October 2026.

== Results ==
=== Qualifying ===
The qualifying was started on 17 October at 11:36. The top four riders advanced directly to the 1/8 finals; places 5 to 28 advanced to the 1/16 final.

Rank	Name	Nation	Time	Behind	Notes
1	Leigh Hoffman	Australia	9.285		Q
2	Harrie Lavreysen	Netherlands	9.426	+0.141	Q
3	Nicholas Paul	Trinidad and Tobago	9.449	+0.164	Q
4	Mateusz Rudyk	Poland	9.499	+0.214	Q
5	Kaiya Ota	Japan	9.501	+0.216	Q
6	Henric Hackmann	Germany	9.546	+0.261	Q
7	Li Zhiwei	China	9.557	+0.272	Q
8	Azizulhasni Awang	Malaysia	9.564	+0.279	Q
9	Harry Ledingham-Horn	Great Britain	9.567	+0.282	Q
10	Daniel Barber	Australia	9.584	+0.299	Q
11	Jeffrey Hoogland	Netherlands	9.586	+0.301	Q
12	Xie Han	China	9.593	+0.308	Q
13	Mattia Predomo	Italy	9.601	+0.316	Q
14	Dominik Topinka	Czechia	9.655	+0.370	Q
15	Mikhail Iakovlev	Israel	9.661	+0.376	Q
16	David Peterka	Czechia	9.663	+0.378	Q
17	Lucas Vilar	Argentina	9.679	+0.394	Q
18	Shinji Nakano	Japan	9.680	+0.395	Q
19	Tom Derache	France	9.699	+0.414	Q
20	Njisane Phillip	Trinidad and Tobago	9.720	+0.435	Q
21	Minato Nakaishi	Japan	9.721	+0.436	Q
22	Luca Spiegel	Germany	9.726	+0.441	Q
23	Rayan Helal	France	9.739	+0.454	Q
24	Cole Dempster	Canada	9.742	+0.457	Q
25	Cristian Ortega	Colombia	9.747	+0.462	Q
26	Kevin Quintero	Colombia	9.761	+0.476	Q
27	Nikita Kiriltsev	Individual Neutral Athletes	9.783	+0.498	Q
28	Lowie Nulens	Belgium	9.805	+0.520	Q
29	Bohdan Danylchuk	Ukraine	9.840	+0.555	
30	Sándor Szalontay	Hungary	9.859	+0.574	
31	Nikita Kalachnik	Individual Neutral Athletes	9.946	+0.661	
32	Kwesi Browne	Trinidad and Tobago	9.977	+0.692	
33	To Cheuk Hei	Hong Kong	10.005	+0.720	

=== 1/16 finals ===
The 1/16 finals was started on 17 October at 12:38.

Heat	Rank	Name	Nation	Gap	Notes
1	1	Kaiya Ota	Japan		Q
1	2	Lowie Nulens	Belgium	+0.025	
2	1	Henric Hackmann	Germany		Q
2	2	Nikita Kiriltsev	Individual Neutral Athletes	+0.007	
3	1	Li Zhiwei	China		Q
3	2	Kevin Quintero	Colombia	+0.059	
4	1	Azizulhasni Awang	Malaysia		Q
4	2	Cristian Ortega	Colombia	+0.030	
5	1	Harry Ledingham-Horn	Great Britain		Q
5	2	Cole Dempster	Canada	+0.087	
6	1	Daniel Barber	Australia		Q
6	2	Rayan Helal	France	+0.043	
7	1	Jeffrey Hoogland	Netherlands		Q
7	2	Luca Spiegel	Germany	+0.148	
8	1	Minato Nakaishi	Japan		Q
8	2	Xie Han	China	+0.012	
9	1	Mattia Predomo	Italy		Q
9	2	Njisane Phillip	Trinidad and Tobago	+0.028	
10	1	Dominik Topinka	Czechia		Q
10	2	Tom Derache	France	+0.113	
11	1	Shinji Nakano	Japan		Q
11	2	Mikhail Iakovlev	Israel	+0.082	
12	1	Lucas Vilar	Argentina		Q
12	2	David Peterka	Czechia	+0.002	

=== 1/8 finals ===
The 1/8 finals was started on 17 October at 14:32.

Heat	Rank	Name	Nation	Gap	Notes
1	1	Leigh Hoffman	Australia		Q
1	2	Lucas Vilar	Argentina	+0.525	
2	1	Harrie Lavreysen	Netherlands		Q
2	2	Shinji Nakano	Japan	+0.224	
3	1	Nicholas Paul	Trinidad and Tobago		Q
3	2	Dominik Topinka	Czechia	+0.071	
4	1	Mateusz Rudyk	Poland		Q
4	2	Mattia Predomo	Italy	+0.028	
5	1	Kaiya Ota	Japan		Q
5	2	Minato Nakaishi	Japan	+0.170	
6	1	Henric Hackmann	Germany		Q
6	2	Jeffrey Hoogland	Netherlands	+0.140	
7	1	Daniel Barber	Australia		Q
7	2	Li Zhiwei	China	+0.006	
8	1	Harry Ledingham-Horn	Great Britain		Q
8	2	Azizulhasni Awang	Malaysia	+0.021	

=== Quarterfinals ===
The quarterfinals were started on 17 October at 18:01.

Heat	Rank	Name	Nation	Race 1	Race 2	Decider (i.r.)	Notes
1	1	Leigh Hoffman	Australia	X	X		Q
1	2	Harry Ledingham-Horn	Great Britain	+0.924	+0.072		
2	1	Harrie Lavreysen	Netherlands	X	X		Q
2	2	Daniel Barber	Australia	+0.189	+2.069		
3	1	Nicholas Paul	Trinidad and Tobago	X	X		Q
3	2	Henric Hackmann	Germany	+0.010	+2.807		
4	1	Kaiya Ota	Japan	X	X		Q
4	2	Mateusz Rudyk	Poland	+0.146	+0.065		

=== Semifinals ===
The semifinals were started on 18 October at 11:00.

Heat	Rank	Name	Nation	Race 1	Race 2	Decider (i.r.)	Notes
1	1	Leigh Hoffman	Australia	X	X		QG
1	2	Kaiya Ota	Japan	+0.155	+0.111		QB
2	1	Harrie Lavreysen	Netherlands	X	X		QG
2	2	Nicholas Paul	Trinidad and Tobago	+0.120	+0.477		QB

=== Finals ===
The finals were started on 18 October at 13:49.

Rank	Name	Nation	Race 1	Race 2	Decider (i.r.)
Gold medal race
1st place, gold medalist(s)	Harrie Lavreysen	Netherlands	X	X	
2nd place, silver medalist(s)	Leigh Hoffman	Australia	+0.093	+0.183	
Bronze medal race
3rd place, bronze medalist(s)	Kaiya Ota	Japan	X	X	
4	Nicholas Paul	Trinidad and Tobago	+0.052	+0.256	
