= 2024 UCI Track Cycling World Championships – Men's keirin =

Men's keirin at the 2024 UCI Track Cycling World Championships
- Venue: Ballerup Super Arena
- Location: Ballerup, Denmark
- Dates: 17 October
- Competitors: 27 from 19 nations

Medalists
gold medal	Kento Yamasaki	Japan
silver medal	Mikhail Iakovlev	Israel
bronze medal	Kevin Quintero	Colombia

The Men's keirin competition at the 2024 UCI Track Cycling World Championships was held on 17 October 2024.

== Results ==
=== First round ===
The first round was started at 14:00. The first two riders from each heat qualified for the quarterfinals, all other riders moved to the repechages.

Heat 1

Rank	Name	Nation	Gap	Notes
1	Kevin Quintero	Colombia		Q
2	Kento Yamasaki	Japan	+0.084	Q
3	To Cheuk Hei	Hong Kong	+0.100	
4	Luca Spiegel	Germany	+0.211	
5	Vasilijus Lendel	Lithuania	+0.781	

Heat 3

Rank	Name	Nation	Gap	Notes
1	Kaiya Ota	Japan		Q
2	Mateusz Rudyk	Poland	+0.038	Q
3	Cristian Ortega	Colombia	+0.140	
4	Ryan Elliott	Australia	+0.478	
5	Muhammad Ridwan Sahrom	Malaysia	+0.687	

Heat 5

Rank	Name	Nation	Gap	Notes
1	Mikhail Iakovlev	Israel		Q
2	Jeffrey Hoogland	Netherlands	+0.015	Q
3	Thomas Cornish	Australia	+0.141	
4	Jaïr Tjon En Fa	Suriname	+0.546	
5	Harry Ledingham-Horn	Great Britain	+0.578	
6	Kirill Kurdidi	Kazakhstan	+2.689	

Heat 2

Rank	Name	Nation	Gap	Notes
1	Harrie Lavreysen	Netherlands		Q
2	Nicholas Paul	Trinidad and Tobago	+0.054	Q
3	Santiago Ramírez	Colombia	+0.084	
4	Kang Shih-feng	Chinese Taipei	+0.835	
5	Martin Čechman	Czech Republic	+1.711	

Heat 4

Rank	Name	Nation	Gap	Notes
1	Shinji Nakano	Japan		Q
2	Muhammad Shah Firdaus Sahrom	Malaysia	+0.048	Q
3	Tijmen van Loon	Netherlands	+0.185	
4	James Hedgcock	Canada	+0.289	
5	Stefano Moro	Italy	+0.617	
6	Hayden Norris	Great Britain	+0.619	

=== First round repechage ===
The first round repechage was started at 15:07. The first two riders from each heat qualified for the quarterfinals.

Heat 1

Rank	Name	Nation	Gap	Notes
1	James Hedgcock	Canada		Q
2	To Cheuk Hei	Hong Kong	+0.051	Q
3	Jaïr Tjon En Fa	Suriname	+0.096	
4	Hayden Norris	Great Britain	+0.503	

Heat 3

Rank	Name	Nation	Gap	Notes
1	Cristian Ortega	Colombia		Q
2	Kang Shih-feng	Chinese Taipei	+0.228	Q
3	Vasilijus Lendel	Lithuania	+0.252	
4	Kirill Kurdidi	Kazakhstan	+0.664	

Heat 2

Rank	Name	Nation	Gap	Notes
1	Harry Ledingham-Horn	Great Britain		Q
2	Santiago Ramírez	Colombia	+0.040	Q
3	Luca Spiegel	Germany	+0.104	
4	Ryan Elliott	Australia	+0.615	

Heat 4

Rank	Name	Nation	Gap	Notes
1	Thomas Cornish	Australia		Q
2	Stefano Moro	Italy	+0.008	Q
3	Martin Čechman	Czech Republic	+0.164	
4	Tijmen van Loon	Netherlands	+0.171	
5	Muhammad Ridwan Sahrom	Malaysia	+0.562	

=== Quarterfinals ===
The quarterfinals were started at 16:08. The first four riders from each heat qualified for the semifinals.

Heat 1

Rank	Name	Nation	Gap	Notes
1	Shinji Nakano	Japan		Q
2	Kevin Quintero	Colombia	+0.099	Q
3	Stefano Moro	Italy	+0.391	Q
4	Harry Ledingham-Horn	Great Britain	+0.545	Q
5	Thomas Cornish	Australia	+0.577	
6	Nicholas Paul	Trinidad and Tobago	+0.656	

Heat 3

Rank	Name	Nation	Gap	Notes
1	Mikhail Iakovlev	Israel		Q
2	Jeffrey Hoogland	Netherlands	+0.053	Q
3	Muhammad Ridwan Sahrom	Malaysia	+0.082	Q
4	To Cheuk Hei	Hong Kong	+0.180	Q
5	Kaiya Ota	Japan	+0.219	
6	Santiago Ramírez	Colombia	+0.243	

Heat 2

Rank	Name	Nation r	Gap	Notes
1	Harrie Lavreysen	Netherlands		Q
2	Mateusz Rudyk	Poland	+0.021	Q
3	Kento Yamasaki	Japan	+0.073	Q
4	Kang Shih-feng	Chinese Taipei	+0.092	Q
5	Cristian Ortega	Colombia	+0.171	
6	James Hedgcock	Canada	+0.182	

=== Semifinals ===
The semifinals were started at 19:16. The first three riders in each heat qualified for the final, all other riders raced for places 7 to 12.

Heat 1

Rank	Name	Nation	Gap	Notes
1	Kevin Quintero	Colombia		Q
2	Kento Yamasaki	Japan	+0.033	Q
3	Mateusz Rudyk	Poland	+0.040	Q
4	Muhammad Ridwan Sahrom	Malaysia	+0.129	
5	Shinji Nakano	Japan	+0.132	
6	To Cheuk Hei	Hong Kong	+0.799	

Heat 2

Rank	Name	Nation	Gap	Notes
1	Mikhail Iakovlev	Israel		Q
2	Jeffrey Hoogland	Netherlands		Q
3	Harry Ledingham-Horn	Great Britain	+0.108	Q
4	Harrie Lavreysen	Netherlands	+0.251	
5	Stefano Moro	Italy	+1.227	
6	Kang Shih-feng	Chinese Taipei	+1.481	

=== Finals ===
The finals were started at 19:16.

==== Small final ====
Rank	Name	Nation	Gap	Notes
7	Shinji Nakano	Japan		
8	Harrie Lavreysen	Netherlands	+0.145	
9	Muhammad Ridwan Sahrom	Malaysia	+0.734	
10	Stefano Moro	Italy	+0.863	
11	Kang Shih-feng	Chinese Taipei	+0.987	
12	To Cheuk Hei	Hong Kong	+1.187	

==== Final ====
Rank	Name	Nation	Gap	Notes
1st place, gold medalist(s)	Kento Yamasaki	Japan		
2nd place, silver medalist(s)	Mikhail Iakovlev	Israel	+0.034	
3rd place, bronze medalist(s)	Kevin Quintero	Colombia	+0.068	
4	Harry Ledingham-Horn	Great Britain	+0.183	
5	Mateusz Rudyk	Poland	+0.239	
6	Jeffrey Hoogland	Netherlands	+0.266	
