= 2025 UEC European Track Championships – Men's keirin =

Cycling competition

Men's keirin at the 2025 UEC European Track Championships
- Venue: Velodroom Limburg, Heusden-Zolder
- Date: 16 February
- Competitors: 29 from 17 nations

Medalists
gold medal	Harrie Lavreysen	Netherlands
silver medal	Maximilian Dörnbach	Germany
bronze medal	Tom Derache	France

The men's keirin competition at the 2025 UEC European Track Championships was held on 16 February 2025.

== Results ==
=== First round ===
The first rider in each heat qualified for the second round, and all other riders advanced to the first round repechages.

Heat 1

Rank	Name	Nation	Notes
1	Harrie Lavreysen	Netherlands	Q
2	Matěj Tamme	Czech Republic	
3	Rafał Sarnecki	Poland	
4	Lyall Craig	Great Britain	

Heat 2

Rank	Name	Nation	Notes
1	Mateusz Rudyk	Poland	Q
2	Konstantinos Livanos	Greece	
3	Laurynas Vinskas	Lithuania	
4	Esteban Sánchez	Spain	
5	Vladyslav Denysenko	Ukraine	

Heat 3

Rank	Name	Nation	Notes
1	Mikhail Iakovlev	Israel	Q
2	Patrik Rómeó Lovassy	Hungary	
3	Mattia Predomo	Italy	
4	José Moreno Sánchez	Spain	
5	Eduard Žalar	Slovenia	

Heat 4

Rank	Name	Nation	Notes
1	Maximilian Dörnbach	Germany	Q
2	Stefano Moro	Italy	
3	Nikita Kalachnik	Individual Neutral Athletes	
4	Runar De Schrijver	Belgium	
5	Dominik Topinka	Czech Republic	

Heat 5

Rank	Name	Nation	Notes
1	Tom Derache	France	Q
2	Harry Ledingham-Horn	Great Britain	
3	Lowie Nulens	Belgium	
4	Ioannis Kalogeropoulos	Greece	
5	Luca Spiegel	Germany	

Heat 6

Rank	Name	Nation	Notes
1	Sebastien Vigier	France	Q
2	Tijmen van Loon	Netherlands	
3	Nikita Kiriltsev	Individual Neutral Athletes	
4	Vasilijus Lendel	Lithuania	
5	Bohdan Danylchuk	Ukraine	

=== Repechage ===
The first rider in each heat qualify to the second round.

Heat 1

Rank	Name	Nation	Notes
1	Matěj Tamme	Czech Republic	Q
2	Vasilijus Lendel	Lithuania	
3	Esteban Sánchez	Spain	

Heat 2

Rank	Name	Nation	Notes
1	Lowie Nulens	Belgium	Q
2	Konstantinos Livanos	Greece	
3	Lyall Craig	Great Britain	
4	Eduard Žalar	Slovenia	

Heat 3

Rank	Name	Nation	Notes
1	Nikita Kalachnik	Individual Neutral Athletes	Q
2	Bohdan Danylchuk	Ukraine	
3	Patrik Rómeó Lovassy	Hungary	
4	Ioannis Kalogeropoulos	Greece	

Heat 4

Rank	Name	Nation	Notes
1	Stefano Moro	Italy	Q
2	Nikita Kiriltsev	Individual Neutral Athletes	
3	Rafał Sarnecki	Poland	
4	Vladyslav Denysenko	Ukraine	

Heat 5

Rank	Name	Nation	Notes
1	Laurynas Vinskas	Lithuania	Q
2	José Moreno Sánchez	Spain	
3	Harry Ledingham-Horn	Great Britain	
4	Dominik Topinka	Czech Republic	

Heat 6

Rank	Name	Nation	Notes
1	Mattia Predomo	Italy	Q
2	Tijmen van Loon	Netherlands	
3	Luca Spiegel	Germany	
4	Runar De Schrijver	Belgium	

=== Second round ===
The first three riders in each heat qualify to final 1–6, all other riders advance to final 7–12.

Heat 1

Rank	Name	Nation	Notes
1	Harrie Lavreysen	Netherlands	Q
2	Tom Derache	France	Q
3	Maximilian Dörnbach	Germany	Q
4	Lowie Nulens	Belgium	
5	Mattia Predomo	Italy	
6	Nikita Kalachnik	Individual Neutral Athletes	

Heat 2

Rank	Name	Nation	Notes
1	Sébastien Vigier	France	Q
2	Mateusz Rudyk	Poland	Q
3	Stefano Moro	Italy	Q
4	Mikhail Yakovlev	Israel	
5	Matěj Tamme	Czech Republic	
6	Laurynas Vinskas	Lithuania	

=== Final ===
Small final

Rank	Name	Nation	Notes
7	Mikhail Yakovlev	Israel	
8	Nikita Kalachnik	Individual Neutral Athletes	
9	Lowie Nulens	Belgium	
10	Laurynas Vinskas	Lithuania	
11	Matěj Tamme	Czech Republic	
12	Mattia Predomo	Italy	

Final

Rank	Name	Nation	Notes
1st place, gold medalist(s)	Harrie Lavreysen	Netherlands	
2nd place, silver medalist(s)	Maximilian Dörnbach	Germany	
3rd place, bronze medalist(s)	Tom Derache	France	
4	Stefano Moro	Italy	
5	Mateusz Rudyk	Poland	
6	Sébastien Vigier	France	
