= 2025 UEC European Track Championships – Men's sprint =

Men's sprint at the 2025 UEC European Track Championships
- Venue: Velodroom Limburg, Heusden-Zolder
- Date: 14–15 February
- Competitors: 29 from 16 nations

Medalists
gold medal	Harrie Lavreysen	Netherlands
silver medal	Mikhail Yakovlev	Israel
bronze medal	Rayan Helal	France

The men's sprint competition at the 2025 UEC European Track Championships was held on 14 and 15 February 2025.

== Results ==
=== Qualifying ===
The top 4 riders qualified for the 1/8 finals, 5th to 28th places qualified for the 1/16 finals.

Rank	Name	Nation	Time	Behind	Notes
1	Mikhail Yakovlev	Israel	9.402		Q
2	Harrie Lavreysen	Netherlands	9.405	+0.003	Q
3	Mateusz Rudyk	Poland	9.566	+0.164	Q
4	Rayan Helal	France	9.651	+0.249	Q
5	Harry Ledingham-Horn	Great Britain	9.698	+0.296	q
6	Tijmen van Loon	Netherlands	9.737	+0.335	q
7	Sébastien Vigier	France	9.796	+0.394	q
8	Matěj Tamme	Czech Republic	9.811	+0.409	q
9	Luca Spiegel	Germany	9.819	+0.417	q
10	Dominik Topinka	Czech Republic	9.819	+0.417	q
11	Vladyslav Denysenko	Ukraine	9.831	+0.429	q
12	Rafał Sarnecki	Poland	9.872	+0.470	q
13	Hayden Norris	Great Britain	9.892	+0.490	q
14	Ekain Jiménez	Spain	9.921	+0.519	q
15	Mattia Predomo	Italy	9.923	+0.521	q
16	Nikita Kalachnik	Individual Neutral Athletes	9.943	+0.541	q
17	Nikita Kiriltsev	Individual Neutral Athletes	9.949	+0.547	q
18	Maximilian Dörnbach	Germany	9.957	+0.555	q
19	Konstantinos Livanos	Greece	10.001	+0.599	q
20	Runar De Schrijver	Belgium	10.003	+0.601	q
21	Stefano Moro	Italy	10.004	+0.602	q
22	Lowie Nulens	Belgium	10.062	+0.660	q
23	Esteban Sánchez	Spain	10.063	+0.661	q
24	Vasilijus Lendel	Lithuania	10.065	+0.663	q
25	Bohdan Danylchuk	Ukraine	10.073	+0.671	q
26	Laurynas Vinskas	Lithuania	10.118	+0.716	q
27	Miltiadis Charovas	Greece	10.298	+0.896	q
28	Patrik Rómeó Lovassy	Hungary	10.306	+0.904	q
29	Eduard Žalar	Slovenia	10.633	+1.231	

=== 1/16 finals ===
Heat winners advanced to the 1/8 finals.

Heat	Rank	Name	Nation	Time	Notes
1	1	Harry Ledingham-Horn	Great Britain	X	Q
1	2	Patrik Rómeó Lovassy	Hungary	+0.185	
2	1	Tijmen van Loon	Netherlands	X	Q
2	2	Miltiadis Charovas	Greece	+0.564	
3	1	Sébastien Vigier	France	X	Q
3	2	Laurynas Vinskas	Lithuania	+0.241	
4	1	Matěj Tamme	Czech Republic	X	Q
4	2	Bohdan Danylchuk	Ukraine	+0.146	
5	1	Vasilijus Lendel	Lithuania	X	Q
5	2	Luca Spiegel	Germany	+0.021	
6	1	Dominik Topinka	Czech Republic	X	Q
6	2	Esteban Sánchez	Spain	+1.977	
7	1	Vladyslav Denysenko	Ukraine	X	Q
7	2	Lowie Nulens	Belgium	+0.018	
8	1	Rafał Sarnecki	Poland	X	Q
8	2	Stefano Moro	Italy	+0.015	
9	1	Hayden Norris	Great Britain	X	Q
9	2	Runar De Schrijver	Belgium	+0.056	
10	1	Konstantinos Livanos	Greece	X	Q
10	2	Ekain Jiménez	Spain	+0.161	
11	1	Mattia Predomo	Italy	X	Q
11	2	Maximilian Dörnbach	Germany	+0.002	
12	1	Nikita Kiriltsev	Individual Neutral Athletes	X	Q
12	2	Nikita Kalachnik	Individual Neutral Athletes	+0.332	

=== 1/8 finals ===
Heat winners advanced to the quarterfinals.

Heat	Rank	Name	Nation	Time	Notes
1	1	Mikhail Yakovlev	Israel	X	Q
1	2	Nikita Kiriltsev	Individual Neutral Athletes	+0.157	
2	1	Harrie Lavreysen	Netherlands	X	Q
2	2	Mattia Predomo	Italy	+0.115	
3	1	Mateusz Rudyk	Poland	X	Q
3	2	Konstantinos Livanos	Greece	+0.049	
4	1	Rayan Helal	France	X	Q
4	2	Hayden Norris	Great Britain	+0.131	
5	1	Harry Ledingham-Horn	Great Britain	X	Q
5	2	Rafał Sarnecki	Poland	+0.086	
6	1	Tijmen van Loon	Netherlands	X	Q
6	2	Vladyslav Denysenko	Ukraine	+0.368	
7	1	Sébastien Vigier	France	X	Q
7	2	Dominik Topinka	Czech Republic	+0.114	
8	1	Matěj Tamme	Czech Republic	X	Q
8	2	Vasilijus Lendel	Lithuania	+0.294	

=== Quarterfinals ===
Heat winners advanced to the semifinals.

Heat	Rank	Name	Nation	Race 1	Race 2	Decider (i.r.)	Notes
1	1	Mikhail Yakovlev	Israel	X	X		Q
1	2	Matěj Tamme	Czech Republic	+0.472	+0.187		
2	1	Harrie Lavreysen	Netherlands	X	X		Q
2	2	Sébastien Vigier	France	+0.479	+0.052		
3	1	Mateusz Rudyk	Poland	X	X		Q
3	2	Tijmen van Loon	Netherlands	+0.126	+0.054		
4	1	Rayan Helal	France	X	X		Q
4	2	Harry Ledingham-Horn	Great Britain	+0.064	+2.449		

=== Semifinals ===
Winners proceed to the gold medal final; losers proceed to the bronze medal final.

Heat	Rank	Name	Nation	Race 1	Race 2	Decider (i.r.)	Notes
1	1	Mikhail Yakovlev	Israel	X	X		QG
1	2	Rayan Helal	France	+0.098	+0.261		QB
2	1	Harrie Lavreysen	Netherlands	X	X		QG
2	2	Mateusz Rudyk	Poland	+0.205	+0.066		QB

=== Finals ===
Rank	Name	Nation	Race 1	Race 2	Decider (i.r.)
Gold medal final
1st place, gold medalist(s)	Harrie Lavreysen	Netherlands	X	X	
2nd place, silver medalist(s)	Mikhail Yakovlev	Israel	+0.126	+0.127	
Bronze medal final
3rd place, bronze medalist(s)	Rayan Helal	France	X	X	
4	Mateusz Rudyk	Poland	+0.050	+0.307	
