= 2021 UEC European Track Championships – Men's sprint =

Men's sprint at the 2021 UEC European Track Championships
- Venue: Tissot Velodrome, Grenchen
- Date: 7–8 October
- Competitors: 29 from 16 nations

Medalists
gold medal	Harrie Lavreysen	Netherlands
silver medal	Jeffrey Hoogland	Netherlands
bronze medal	Mikhail Iakovlev	Russia

The men's sprint competition at the 2021 UEC European Track Championships was held on 7 and 8 October 2021.

== Results ==
=== Qualifying ===
The top 4 riders qualified for the 1/8 finals, 5th to 28th places qualified for the 1/16 finals.

Rank	Name	Nation	Time	Behind	Notes
1	Harrie Lavreysen	Netherlands	9.360		Q
2	Jeffrey Hoogland	Netherlands	9.499	+0.139	Q
3	Sébastien Vigier	France	9.513	+0.153	Q
4	Mikhail Iakovlev	Russia	9.541	+0.181	Q
5	Tom Derache	France	9.566	+0.206	q
6	Mateusz Rudyk	Poland	9.594	+0.234	q
7	Denis Dmitriev	Russia	9.661	+0.301	q
8	Marc Jurczyk	Germany	9.739	+0.379	q
9	Anton Höhne	Germany	9.762	+0.402	q
10	Daniel Rochna	Poland	9.796	+0.436	q
11	Hamish Turnbull	Great Britain	9.839	+0.479	q
12	Joseph Truman	Great Britain	9.850	+0.490	q
13	Vasilijus Lendel	Lithuania	9.892	+0.532	q
14	Martin Čechman	Czech Republic	9.928	+0.548	q
15	Sándor Szalontay	Hungary	9.908	+0.568	q
16	Alejandro Martínez	Spain	10.003	+0.643	q
17	Dominik Topinka	Czech Republic	10.067	+0.707	q
18	Uladzislau Novik	Belarus	10.091	+0.731	q
19	Konstantinos Livanos	Greece	10.131	+0.771	q
20	Svajūnas Jonauskas	Lithuania	10.200	+0.840	q
21	Ekain Jiménez	Spain	10.202	+0.842	q
22	Patrik Rómeó Lovassy	Hungary	10.220	+0.860	q
23	Sotirios Bretas	Greece	10.228	+0.868	q
24	Norbert Szabo	Romania	10.268	+0.908	q
25	Vladyslav Denysenko	Ukraine	10.299	+0.939	q
26	Miroslav Minchev	Bulgaria	10.311	+0.951	q
27	Matteo Bianchi	Italy	10.340	+0.980	q
28	Aliaksandr Hlova	Belarus	10.499	+1.139	q
29	Bohdan Danylchuk	Ukraine	10.536	+1.176	

=== 1/16 finals ===
Heat winners advanced to the 1/8 finals.

Heat	Rank	Name	Nation	Time	Notes
1	1	Tom Derache	France	X	Q
1	2	Aliaksandr Hlova	Belarus	+0.169	
2	1	Mateusz Rudyk	Poland	X	Q
2	2	Matteo Bianchi	Italy	+0.128	
3	1	Denis Dmitriev	Russia	X	Q
3	2	Miroslav Minchev	Bulgaria	+0.026	
4	1	Marc Jurczyk	Germany	X	Q
4	2	Vladyslav Denysenko	Ukraine	+0.233	
5	1	Anton Höhne	Germany	X	Q
5	2	Norbert Szabo	Romania	+0.132	
6	1	Daniel Rochna	Poland	X	Q
6	2	Sotirios Bretas	Greece	+0.397	
7	1	Hamish Turnbull	Great Britain	X	Q
7	2	Patrik Rómeó Lovassy	Hungary	+0.052	
8	1	Joseph Truman	Great Britain	X	Q
8	2	Ekain Jiménez	Spain	+0.136	
9	1	Vasilijus Lendel	Lithuania	X	Q
9	2	Svajūnas Jonauskas	Lithuania	+0.184	
10	1	Konstantinos Livanos	Greece	X	Q
10	2	Sándor Szalontay	Hungary	+0.071	
11	1	Martin Čechman	Czech Republic	X	Q
11	2	Uladzislau Novik	Belarus	+0.104	
12	1	Dominik Topinka	Czech Republic	X	Q
12	2	Alejandro Martínez	Spain	+0.016	

=== 1/8 finals ===
Heat winners advanced to the quarterfinals.

Heat	Rank	Name	Nation	Time	Notes
1	1	Harrie Lavreysen	Netherlands	X	Q
1	2	Dominik Topinka	Czech Republic	+0.138	
2	1	Jeffrey Hoogland	Netherlands	X	Q
2	2	Martin Čechman	Czech Republic	+1.011	
3	1	Sébastien Vigier	France	X	Q
3	2	Konstantinos Livanos	Greece	+0.069	
4	1	Mikhail Iakovlev	Russia	X	Q
4	2	Vasilijus Lendel	Lithuania	+0.027	
5	1	Tom Derache	France	X	Q
5	2	Joseph Truman	Great Britain	+0.008	
6	1	Mateusz Rudyk	Poland	X	Q
6	2	Hamish Turnbull	Great Britain	+0.045	
7	1	Daniel Rochna	Poland	X	Q
7	2	Denis Dmitriev	Russia	+0.043	
8	1	Anton Höhne	Germany	X	Q
8	2	Marc Jurczyk	Germany	+0.049	

=== Quarterfinals ===
Matches are extended to a best-of-three format hereon; winners proceed to the semifinals.

Heat	Rank	Name	Nation	Race 1	Race 2	Decider (i.r.)	Notes
1	1	Harrie Lavreysen	Netherlands	X	X		Q
1	2	Anton Höhne	Germany	+0.080	+0.199		
2	1	Jeffrey Hoogland	Netherlands	X	X		Q
2	2	Daniel Rochna	Poland	+0.063	+2.830		
3	1	Sébastien Vigier	France	X	X		Q
3	2	Mateusz Rudyk	Poland	+0.020	+0.132		
4	1	Mikhail Iakovlev	Russia	X	X		Q
4	2	Tom Derache	France	+0.093	+0.071		

=== Semifinals ===
Winners proceed to the gold medal final; losers proceed to the bronze medal final.

Heat	Rank	Name	Nation	Race 1	Race 2	Decider (i.r.)	Notes
1	1	Harrie Lavreysen	Netherlands	X	X		QG
1	2	Mikhail Iakovlev	Russia	+0.266	+0.096		QB
2	1	Jeffrey Hoogland	Netherlands	X	X		QG
2	2	Sébastien Vigier	France	+0.013	+0.094		QB

=== Finals ===
Rank	Name	Nation	Race 1	Race 2	Decider (i.r.)
Gold medal final
1st place, gold medalist(s)	Harrie Lavreysen	Netherlands	X	X	
2nd place, silver medalist(s)	Jeffrey Hoogland	Netherlands	+0.152	+0.063	
Bronze medal final
3rd place, bronze medalist(s)	Mikhail Iakovlev	Russia	X	X	
4	Sébastien Vigier	France	+0.148	+0.407	
