= 2024 UCI Track Cycling World Championships – Men's sprint =

Men's sprint at the 2024 UCI Track Cycling World Championships
- Venue: Ballerup Super Arena
- Location: Ballerup, Denmark
- Dates: 19–20 October
- Competitors: 30 from 19 nations

Medalists
gold medal	Harrie Lavreysen	Netherlands
silver medal	Jeffrey Hoogland	Netherlands
bronze medal	Kaiya Ota	Japan

The Men's sprint competition at the 2024 UCI Track Cycling World Championships was held on 19 and 20 October 2024.

== Results ==
=== Qualifying ===
The qualifying was started on 19 October at 12:57. The top four riders advanced directly to the 1/8 finals; places 5 to 28 advanced to the 1/16 final.

Rank	Name	Nation	Time	Behind	Notes
1	Harrie Lavreysen	Netherlands	9.306		Q
2	Mikhail Iakovlev	Israel	9.404	+0.098	Q
3	Nicholas Paul	Trinidad and Tobago	9.499	+0.193	Q
4	Leigh Hoffman	Australia	9.505	+0.199	Q
5	Kaiya Ota	Japan	9.585	+0.279	Q
6	Mateusz Rudyk	Poland	9.595	+0.289	Q
7	Jeffrey Hoogland	Netherlands	9.610	+0.304	Q
8	Yuta Obara	Japan	9.649	+0.343	Q
9	Cristian Ortega	Colombia	9.706	+0.400	Q
10	Shinji Nakano	Japan	9.711	+0.405	Q
11	Joseph Truman	Great Britain	9.721	+0.415	Q
12	Ryan Dodyk	Canada	9.756	+0.450	Q
13	Vasilijus Lendel	Lithuania	9.827	+0.521	Q
14	Tijmen van Loon	Netherlands	9.829	+0.523	Q
15	Luca Spiegel	Germany	9.830	+0.524	Q
16	Tyler Rorke	Canada	9.852	+0.546	Q
17	Kevin Quintero	Colombia	9.857	+0.551	Q
18	Jaïr Tjon En Fa	Suriname	9.903	+0.597	Q
19	Sándor Szalontay	Hungary	9.905	+0.599	Q
20	Martin Čechman	Czech Republic	9.917	+0.611	Q
21	Mattia Predomo	Italy	9.938	+0.632	Q
22	Muhammad Shah Firdaus Sahrom	Malaysia	9.940	+0.634	Q
23	Stefano Moro	Italy	9.943	+0.637	Q
24	Marcus Hiley	Great Britain	9.950	+0.644	Q
25	Muhammad Ridwan Sahrom	Malaysia	10.004	+0.698	Q
26	Kang Shih-feng	Chinese Taipei	10.052	+0.746	Q
27	Ryan Elliott	Australia	10.075	+0.769	Q
28	Ronaldo Laitonjam	India	10.092	+0.786	Q
29	Henric Hackmann	Germany	10.179	+0.873	
30	To Cheuk Hei	Hong Kong	10.267	+0.961	

=== 1/16 finals ===
The 1/16 finals were started on 19 October at 13:55.

Heat	Rank	Name	Nation	Gap	Notes
1	1	Kaiya Ota	Japan		Q
1	2	Ronaldo Laitonjam	India	+0.023	
2	1	Mateusz Rudyk	Poland		Q
2	2	Ryan Elliott	Australia	+0.068	
3	1	Jeffrey Hoogland	Netherlands		Q
3	2	Kang Shih-feng	Chinese Taipei	+0.179	
4	1	Yuta Obara	Japan		Q
4	2	Muhammad Ridwan Sahrom	Malaysia	+0.079	
5	1	Cristian Ortega	Colombia}		Q
5	2	Marcus Hiley	Great Britain	+0.159	
6	1	Shinji Nakano	Japan		Q
6	2	Stefano Moro	Italy	+0.085	
7	1	Joseph Truman	Great Britain		Q
7	2	Muhammad Shah Firdaus Sahrom	Malaysia	+0.179	
8	1	Mattia Predomo	Italy		Q
8	2	Ryan Dodyk	Canada	+0.039	
9	1	Vasilijus Lendel	Lithuania		Q
9	2	Martin Čechman	Czech Republic	+0.314	
10	1	Tijmen van Loon	Netherlands		Q
10	2	Sándor Szalontay	Hungary	+0.322	
11	1	Jaïr Tjon En Fa	Suriname		Q
11	2	Luca Spiegel	Germany	+0.043	
12	1	Tyler Rorke	Canada		Q
12	2	Kevin Quintero	Colombia	+0.123	

=== 1/8 finals ===
The 1/8 finals were started on 19 October at 13:55.

Heat	Rank	Name	Nation	Gap	Notes
1	1	Harrie Lavreysen	Netherlands		Q
1	2	Tyler Rorke	Canada	+0.050	
2	1	Mikhail Iakovlev	Israel		Q
2	2	Jaïr Tjon En Fa	Suriname	+0.116	
3	1	Nicholas Paul	Trinidad and Tobago		Q
3	2	Tijmen van Loon	Netherlands	+0.099	
4	1	Leigh Hoffman	Australia		Q
4	2	Vasilijus Lendel	Lithuania	+1.160	
5	1	Kaiya Ota	Japan		Q
5	2	Mattia Predomo	Italy	+0.096	
6	1	Joseph Truman	Great Britain		Q
6	2	Mateusz Rudyk	Poland	+0.180	
7	1	Jeffrey Hoogland	Netherlands		Q
7	2	Shinji Nakano	Japan	+0.051	
8	1	Yuta Obara	Japan		Q
8	2	Cristian Ortega	Colombia	+0.039	

=== Quarterfinals ===
The quarterfinals was started on 19 October at 12:57.

Heat	Rank	Name	Nation	Race 1	Race 2	Decider (i.r.)	Notes
1	1	Harrie Lavreysen	Netherlands	X	X		Q
1	2	Yuta Obara	Japan	+0.309	+0.118		
2	1	Jeffrey Hoogland	Netherlands	X	+0.006	X	Q
2	2	Mikhail Iakovlev	Israel	+3.722	X	+0.018	
3	1	Nicholas Paul	Trinidad and Tobago	X	X		Q
3	2	Joseph Truman	Great Britain	+0.121	+0.112		
4	1	Kaiya Ota	Japan	X	X		Q
4	2	Leigh Hoffman	Australia	+0.055	+0.186		

=== Semifinals ===
The semifinals was started on 20 October at 11:00.

Heat	Rank	Name	Nation	Race 1	Race 2	Decider (i.r.)	Notes
1	1	Harrie Lavreysen	Netherlands	X	X		Q
1	2	Kaiya Ota	Japan	+0.132	+0.042		
2	1	Jeffrey Hoogland	Netherlands	+0.243	X	X	Q
2	2	Nicholas Paul	Trinidad and Tobago	X	+0.169	+9.271	

=== Finals ===
The finals was started on 20 October at 13:46.

Rank	Name	Nation	Race 1	Race 2	Decider (i.r.)
Gold medal race
1st place, gold medalist(s)	Harrie Lavreysen	Netherlands	X	X	
2nd place, silver medalist(s)	Jeffrey Hoogland	Netherlands	+1.026	+0.150	
Bronze medal race
3rd place, bronze medalist(s)	Kaiya Ota	Japan	X	X	
4	Nicholas Paul	Trinidad and Tobago	+0.409	+0.217	
