= 2022 UCI Track Cycling World Championships – Men's keirin =

Men's keirin at the 2022 UCI Track Cycling World Championships
- Venue: Vélodrome National
- Location: Saint-Quentin-en-Yvelines, France
- Dates: 13 October
- Competitors: 28 from 19 nations

Medalists
gold medal	Harrie Lavreysen	Netherlands
silver medal	Jeffrey Hoogland	Netherlands
bronze medal	Kevin Quintero	Colombia

The Men's keirin competition at the 2022 UCI Track Cycling World Championships was held on 13 October 2022.

== Results ==
=== First round ===
The first round was started at 14:00. The first two riders from each qualified for the second round, all other riders moved to the repechage.

Heat 1

Rank	Name	Nation	Gap	Notes
1	Harrie Lavreysen	Netherlands		Q
2	Muhammad Shah Firdaus Sahrom	Malaysia	+0.032	Q
3	Svajūnas Jonauskas	Lithuania	+0.096	
4	Rayan Helal	France	+0.223	
5	Alejandro Martínez	Spain	+2.894	

Heat 3

Rank	Name	Nation	Gap	Notes
1	Kevin Quintero	Colombia		Q
2	Matthew Richardson	Australia	+0.023	Q
3	Kwesi Browne	Trinidad and Tobago	+0.392	
4	Zhou Yu	China	+0.664	
5	Melvin Landerneau	France	+1.247	
6	Marc Jurczyk	Germany	+1.485	

Heat 5

Rank	Name	Nation	Gap	Notes
1	Jack Carlin	Great Britain		Q
2	Jeffrey Hoogland	Netherlands	+0.015	Q
3	Thomas Cornish	Australia	+0.048	
4	Jai Angsuthasawit	Thailand	+0.120	
5	James Hedgcock	Canada	+0.200	
6	Jean Spies	South Africa	+1.488	

Heat 2

Rank	Name	Nation	Gap	Notes
1	Stefan Bötticher	Germany		Q
2	Kohei Terasaki	Japan	+0.063	Q
3	Sébastien Vigier	France	+0.071	
4	Santiago Ramírez	Colombia	+0.140	
5	Tomáš Bábek	Czech Republic	+0.361	

Heat 4

Rank	Name	Nation	Gap	Notes
1	Matthew Glaetzer	Australia		Q
2	Kento Yamasaki	Japan	+0.070	Q
3	Jaïr Tjon En Fa	Suriname	+0.099	
4	Sergey Ponomaryov	Kazakhstan	+0.367	
5	Esow Alben	India	+0.367	
–	Tijmen van Loon	Netherlands	Did not finish	

=== First round repechage ===
The first round repechage was started at 15:11. The first two riders from each heat qualified for the quarterfinals.

Heat 1

Rank	Name	Nation	Gap	Notes
1	Jai Angsuthasawit	Thailand		Q
2	Sergey Ponomaryov	Kazakhstan	+0.069	Q
3	Marc Jurczyk	Germany	+0.147	
4	Svajūnas Jonauskas	Lithuania	+0.285	

Heat 3

Rank	Name	Nation	Gap	Notes
1	Santiago Ramírez	Colombia		Q
2	Esow Alben	India	+0.081	Q
3	Kwesi Browne	Trinidad and Tobago	+0.164	
4	Alejandro Martínez	Spain	+0.203	
5	Jean Spies	South Africa	+0.292	

Heat 2

Rank	Name	Nation	Gap	Notes
1	Sébastien Vigier	France		Q
2	Rayan Helal	France	+0.184	Q
3	James Hedgcock	Canada	+1.153	
4	Zhou Yu	China	+1.382	
5	Tijmen van Loon	Netherlands	+1.836	

Heat 4

Rank	Name	Nation	Gap	Notes
1	Melvin Landerneau	France		Q
2	Jaïr Tjon En Fa	Suriname	+0.059	Q
3	Thomas Cornish	Australia	+0.195	
4	Tomáš Bábek	Czech Republic	+0.350	

=== Quarterfinals ===
The quarterfinals were started at 16:07. The first four riders in each heat qualified for the semifinals.

Heat 1

Rank	Name	Nation	Gap	Notes
1	Harrie Lavreysen	Netherlands		Q
2	Kohei Terasaki	Japan	+0.035	Q
3	Matthew Glaetzer	Australia	+0.100	Q
4	Sébastien Vigier	France	+0.169	Q
5	Jaïr Tjon En Fa	Suriname	+0.256	
6	Santiago Ramírez	Colombia	+0.403	

Heat 3

Rank	Name	Nation	Gap	Notes
1	Kevin Quintero	Colombia		Q
2	Jeffrey Hoogland	Netherlands	+0.013	Q
3	Muhammad Shah Firdaus Sahrom	Malaysia	+0.093	Q
4	Sergey Ponomaryov	Kazakhstan	+0.210	Q
5	Kento Yamasaki	Japan	+0.294	
6	Rayan Helal	France	+0.324	

Heat 2

Rank	Name	Nation	Gap	Notes
1	Matthew Richardson	Australia		Q
2	Melvin Landerneau	France	+0.026	Q
3	Esow Alben	India	+0.097	Q
4	Jack Carlin	Great Britain	+0.109	Q
5	Stefan Bötticher	Germany	+0.129	Q
6	Jai Angsuthasawit	Thailand	+0.141	Q

=== Semifinals ===
The semifinals were started at 19:14. The first three riders in each heat qualified for the final, all other riders raced for places 7 to 12.

Heat 1

Rank	Name	Nation	Gap	Notes
1	Melvin Landerneau	France	10.055	Q
2	Harrie Lavreysen	Netherlands	+0.021	Q
3	Kohei Terasaki	Japan	+0.061	Q
4	Esow Alben	India	+0.066	
5	Sergey Ponomaryov	Kazakhstan	+0.088	
6	Muhammad Shah Firdaus Sahrom	Malaysia	+0.101	

Heat 2

Rank	Name	Nation	Gap	Notes
1	Kevin Quintero	Colombia	10.032	Q
2	Jeffrey Hoogland	Netherlands	+0.039	Q
3	Sébastien Vigier	France	+0.095	Q
4	Matthew Richardson	Australia	+0.095	
5	Matthew Glaetzer	Australia	+0.115	
6	Jack Carlin	Great Britain	+0.667	

=== Finals ===
The finals were started at 20:37.

==== Small final ====
Rank	Name	Nation	Gap	Notes
7	Matthew Glaetzer	Australia		
8	Matthew Richardson	Australia	+0.110	
9	Jack Carlin	Great Britain	+0.229	
10	Muhammad Shah Firdaus Sahrom	Malaysia	+0.307	
11	Sergey Ponomaryov	Kazakhstan	+1.333	
12	Esow Alben	India	+2.142	

==== Final ====
Rank	Name	Nation	Gap	Notes
1st place, gold medalist(s)	Harrie Lavreysen	Netherlands		
2nd place, silver medalist(s)	Jeffrey Hoogland	Netherlands	+0.025	
3rd place, bronze medalist(s)	Kevin Quintero	Colombia	+0.087	
4	Sébastien Vigier	France	+0.142	
5	Melvin Landerneau	France	+0.203	
6	Kohei Terasaki	Japan	+0.366	
