= 2023 UEC European Track Championships – Men's keirin =

Cycling competition

Men's keirin at the 2023 UEC European Track Championships
- Venue: Tissot Velodrome, Grenchen
- Date: 12 February

The men's keirin competition at the 2023 UEC European Track Championships will be held on 12 February 2023.

== Results ==
=== First round ===
The first two riders in each heat qualified for the second round, and all other riders advanced to the first round repechages.

Heat 1

Rank	Name	Nation	Notes
1	Harrie Lavreysen	Netherlands	Q
2	Rafał Sarnecki	Poland	Q
3	Sándor Szalontay	Hungary	
4	Alejandro Martínez	Spain	
5	Martin Čechman	Czech Republic	
6	Justas Beniušis	Lithuania	

Heat 2

Rank	Name	Nation	Notes
1	Jeffrey Hoogland	Netherlands	Q
2	Mattia Predomo	Italy	Q
3	Patryk Rajkowski	Poland	
4	José Moreno Sánchez	Spain	
5	Maximilian Dörnbach	Germany	
6	Conor Rowley	Ireland	

Heat 3

Rank	Name	Nation	Notes
1	Jack Carlin	Great Britain	Q
2	Melvin Landerneau	France	Q
3	Bohdan Danylchuk	Ukraine	
4	Jakub Šťastný	Czech Republic	
5	Sotirios Bretas	Greece	
6	Matteo Bianchi	Italy	
7	Bálint Csengői	Hungary	

Heat 4

Rank	Name	Nation	Notes
1	Tom Derache	France	Q
2	Mikhail Yakovlev	Israel	Q
3	Marc Jurczyk	Germany	
4	Hamish Turnbull	Great Britain	
5	Vasilijus Lendel	Lithuania	
6	Miltiadis Charovas	Greece	
7	Vladyslav Denysenko	Ukraine	

=== Repechage ===
The first rider in each heat qualify to the second round.

Heat 1

Rank	Name	Nation	Notes
1	Hamish Turnbull	Great Britain	Q
2	Sándor Szalontay	Hungary	
3	Sotirios Bretas	Greece	
4	Conor Rowley	Ireland	

Heat 2

Rank	Name	Nation	Notes
1	Patryk Rajkowski	Poland	Q
2	Maximilian Dörnbach	Germany	
3	Justas Beniušis	Lithuania	
4	Jakub Šťastný	Czech Republic	

Heat 3

Rank	Name	Nation	Notes
1	Martin Čechman	Czech Republic	Q
2	José Moreno Sánchez	Spain	
3	Bohdan Danylchuk	Ukraine	
4	Bálint Csengői	Hungary	
5	Miltiadis Charovas	Greece	

Heat 4

Rank	Name	Nation	Notes
1	Vasilijus Lendel	Lithuania	Q
2	Vladyslav Denysenko	Ukraine	
3	Marc Jurczyk	Germany	
4	Matteo Bianchi	Italy	
5	Alejandro Martínez	Spain	

=== Second round ===
The first three riders in each heat qualify to final 1–6, all other riders advance to final 7–12.

Heat 1

Rank	Name	Nation	Notes
1	Tom Derache	France	Q
2	Harrie Lavreysen	Netherlands	Q
3	Mattia Predomo	Italy	Q
4	Melvin Landerneau	France	
5	Hamish Turnbull	Great Britain	
6	Vasilijus Lendel	Lithuania	

Heat 2

Rank	Name	Nation	Notes
1	Jeffrey Hoogland	Netherlands	Q
2	Patryk Rajkowski	Poland	Q
3	Martin Čechman	Czech Republic	Q
4	Mikhail Yakovlev	Israel	
5	Rafał Sarnecki	Poland	
6	Jack Carlin	Great Britain	

=== Final ===
Small final

Rank	Name	Nation	Notes
7	Mikhail Yakovlev	Israel	
8	Rafał Sarnecki	Poland	
9	Jack Carlin	Great Britain	
10	Hamish Turnbull	Great Britain	
11	Vasilijus Lendel	Lithuania	
12	Melvin Landerneau	France	

Final

Rank	Name	Nation	Notes
1st place, gold medalist(s)	Harrie Lavreysen	Netherlands	
2nd place, silver medalist(s)	Patryk Rajkowski	Poland	
3rd place, bronze medalist(s)	Jeffrey Hoogland	Netherlands	
4	Mattia Predomo	Italy	
5	Martin Čechman	Czech Republic	
6	Tom Derache	France	
