= 2024 UEC European Track Championships – Men's keirin =

Cycling competition

Men's keirin at the 2024 UEC European Track Championships
- Venue: Omnisport Apeldoorn, Apeldoorn
- Date: 14 January
- Competitors: 28 from 16 nations

Medalists
gold medal	Harrie Lavreysen	Netherlands
silver medal	Mateusz Rudyk	Poland
bronze medal	Stefano Moro	Italy

The men's keirin competition at the 2024 UEC European Track Championships was held on 14 January 2024.

== Results ==
=== First round ===
The first two riders in each heat qualified for the second round, and all other riders advanced to the first round repechages.

Heat 1

Rank	Name	Nation	Notes
1	Harrie Lavreysen	Netherlands	Q
2	Sébastien Vigier	France	Q
3	Mateusz Rudyk	Poland	
4	Patrik Rómeó Lovassy	Hungary	
5	Stefano Moro	Italy	
6	Konstantinos Livanos	Greece	
7	Bohdan Danylchuk	Ukraine	

Heat 2

Rank	Name	Nation	Notes
1	Martin Čechman	Czech Republic	Q
2	Mikhail Iakovlev	Israel	Q
3	Hamish Turnbull	Great Britain	
4	Melvin Landerneau	France	
5	Alejandro Martínez	Spain	
6	Runar De Schrijver	Belgium	
7	Christoffer Eriksson	Sweden	

Heat 3

Rank	Name	Nation	Notes
1	Jeffrey Hoogland	Netherlands	Q
2	Jack Carlin	Great Britain	
3	Dominik Topinka	Czech Republic	
4	Tjorven Mertens	Belgium	
5	Sándor Szalontay	Hungary	
6	Marc Jurczyk	Germany	
7	Ioannis Kalogeropoulos	Greece	

Heat 4

Rank	Name	Nation	Notes
1	Maximilian Dörnbach	Germany	Q
2	Vasilijus Lendel	Lithuania	Q
3	Rafał Sarnecki	Poland	
4	Mattia Predomo	Italy	
5	Vladyslav Denysenko	Ukraine	
6	Eduard Žalar	Slovenia	
7	José Moreno Sánchez	Spain	

=== Repechage ===
The first rider in each heat qualify to the second round.

Heat 1

Rank	Name	Nation	Notes
1	Mateusz Rudyk	Poland	Q
2	Mattia Predomo	Italy	
3	José Moreno Sánchez	Spain	
4	Runar De Schrijver	Belgium	
5	Sándor Szalontay	Hungary	

Heat 2

Rank	Name	Nation	Notes
1	Hamish Turnbull	Great Britain	Q
2	Konstantinos Livanos	Greece	
3	Alejandro Martínez	Spain	
4	Tjorven Mertens	Belgium	
5	Bohdan Danylchuk	Ukraine	

Heat 3

Rank	Name	Nation	Notes
1	Stefano Moro	Italy	Q
2	Dominik Topinka	Czech Republic	
3	Ioannis Kalogeropoulos	Greece	
4	Melvin Landerneau	France	
5	Eduard Žalar	Slovenia	

Heat 4

Rank	Name	Nation	Notes
1	Rafał Sarnecki	Poland	Q
2	Vladyslav Denysenko	Ukraine	
3	Marc Jurczyk	Germany	
4	Patrik Rómeó Lovassy	Hungary	
5	Christoffer Eriksson	Sweden	

=== Second round ===
The first three riders in each heat qualify to final 1–6, all other riders advance to final 7–12.

Heat 1

Rank	Name	Nation	Notes
1	Harrie Lavreysen	Netherlands	Q
2	Mateusz Rudyk	Poland	Q
3	Stefano Moro	Italy	Q
4	Jack Carlin	Great Britain	
5	Mikhail Yakovlev	Israel	
6	Maximilian Dörnbach	Germany	

Heat 2

Rank	Name	Nation	Notes
1	Sébastien Vigier	France	Q
2	Hamish Turnbull	Great Britain	Q
3	Martin Čechman	Czech Republic	Q
4	Jeffrey Hoogland	Netherlands	
5	Rafał Sarnecki	Poland	
6	Vasilijus Lendel	Lithuania	

=== Final ===
Small final

Rank	Name	Nation	Notes
7	Jack Carlin	Great Britain	
8	Maximilian Dörnbach	Germany	
9	Jeffrey Hoogland	Netherlands	
10	Rafał Sarnecki	Poland	
11	Mikhail Yakovlev	Israel	
12	Vasilijus Lendel	Lithuania	

Final

Rank	Name	Nation	Notes
1st place, gold medalist(s)	Harrie Lavreysen	Netherlands	
2nd place, silver medalist(s)	Mateusz Rudyk	Poland	
3rd place, bronze medalist(s)	Stefano Moro	Italy	
4	Hamish Turnbull	Great Britain	
5	Sébastien Vigier	France	
6	Martin Čechman	Czech Republic	
