= 2021 UCI Track Cycling World Championships – Men's sprint =

Men's sprint at the 2021 UCI Track Cycling World Championships
- Venue: Vélodrome Couvert Régional Jean Stablinski
- Location: Roubaix, France
- Dates: 23–24 October
- Competitors: 30 from 21 nations

Medalists
gold medal	Harrie Lavreysen	Netherlands
silver medal	Jeffrey Hoogland	Netherlands
bronze medal	Sébastien Vigier	France

The Men's sprint competition at the 2021 UCI Track Cycling World Championships was held on 23 and 24 October 2021.

== Results ==
=== Qualifying ===
The qualifying was started on 23 October at 12:24. The top four riders advanced directly to the 1/8 finals; places 5 to 28 advance to the 1/16 final.

Rank	Name	Nation	Time	Behind	Notes
1	Harrie Lavreysen	Netherlands	9.418		Q
2	Nicholas Paul	Trinidad and Tobago	9.421	+0.003	Q
3	Mikhail Iakovlev	Russian Cycling Federation	9.499	+0.081	Q
4	Sébastien Vigier	France	9.583	+0.165	Q
5	Mateusz Rudyk	Poland	9.641	+0.223	q
6	Jeffrey Hoogland	Netherlands	9.666	+0.248	q
7	Stefan Bötticher	Germany	9.686	+0.268	q
8	Jair Tjon En Fa	Suriname	9.707	+0.289	q
9	Rayan Helal	France	9.723	+0.305	q
10	Daniel Rochna	Poland	9.788	+0.370	q
11	Muhammad Shah Firdaus Sahrom	Malaysia	9.800	+0.382	q
12	Nick Wammes	Canada	9.808	+0.390	q
13	Anton Höhne	Germany	9.834	+0.416	q
14	Kento Yamasaki	Japan	9.835	+0.417	q
15	Joseph Truman	Great Britain	9.836	+0.418	q
16	Sándor Szalontay	Hungary	9.858	+0.440	q
17	Hamish Turnbull	Great Britain	9.931	+0.513	q
18	Pavel Yakushevskiy	Russian Cycling Federation	9.957	+0.539	q
19	Kohei Terasaki	Japan	9.979	+0.561	q
20	Kevin Quintero	Colombia	9.982	+0.564	q
21	Juan Peralta	Spain	10.004	+0.586	q
22	Martin Čechman	Czech Republic	10.029	+0.611	q
23	Jai Angsuthasawit	Thailand	10.060	+0.642	q
24	Vasilijus Lendel	Lithuania	10.139	+0.721	q
25	Juan Ochoa	Colombia	10.201	+0.783	q
26	Edgar Verdugo	Mexico	10.322	+0.904	q
27	Norbert Szabo	Romania	10.375	+0.957	q
28	Juan Ruiz	Mexico	10.406	+0.988	q
29	Mitchell Sparrow	South Africa	10.485	+1.067	
30	Mohamed Elyas Yusoff	Singapore	10.697	+1.279	

=== 1/16 finals ===
The 1/16 finals were started on 23 October at 12:47. Each heat winner advanced to the 1/8 finals.

Heat	Rank	Name	Nation	Gap	Notes
1	1	Mateusz Rudyk	Poland		Q
1	2	Juan Ruiz	Mexico	+0.109	
2	1	Jeffrey Hoogland	Netherlands		Q
2	2	Norbert Szabo	Romania	+0.084	
3	1	Stefan Bötticher	Germany		Q
3	2	Edgar Verdugo	Mexico	+0.142	
4	1	Jair Tjon En Fa	Suriname		Q
4	2	Juan Ochoa	Colombia	+0.202	
5	1	Rayan Helal	France		Q
5	2	Vasilijus Lendel	Lithuania	+0.238	
6	1	Daniel Rochna	Poland		Q
6	2	Jai Angsuthasawit	Thailand	+0.045	
7	1	Muhammad Shah Firdaus Sahrom	Malaysia		Q
7	2	Martin Čechman	Czech Republic	+1.160	
8	1	Nick Wammes	Canada		Q
8	2	Juan Peralta	Spain	+0.161	
9	1	Anton Höhne	Germany		Q
9	2	Kevin Quintero	Colombia	+0.060	
10	1	Kento Yamasaki	Japan		Q
10	2	Kohei Terasaki	Japan	+0.047	
11	1	Joseph Truman	Great Britain		Q
11	2	Pavel Yakushevskiy	Russian Cycling Federation	+0.057	
12	1	Hamish Turnbull	Great Britain		Q
12	2	Sándor Szalontay	Hungary	+0.072	

=== 1/8 finals ===
The 1/8 finals were started on 23 October at 14:17. Each heat winner advanced to the quarterfinals.

Heat	Rank	Name	Nation	Gap	Notes
1	1	Harrie Lavreysen	Netherlands		Q
1	2	Hamish Turnbull	Great Britain	+0.951	
2	1	Nicholas Paul	Trinidad and Tobago		Q
2	2	Joseph Truman	Great Britain	+0.595	
3	1	Mikhail Iakovlev	Russian Cycling Federation		Q
3	2	Kento Yamasaki	Japan	+0.021	
4	1	Sébastien Vigier	France		Q
4	2	Anton Höhne	Germany	+0.222	
5	1	Mateusz Rudyk	Poland		Q
5	2	Nick Wammes	Canada	+0.059	
6	1	Jeffrey Hoogland	Netherlands		Q
6	2	Muhammad Shah Firdaus Sahrom	Malaysia	+0.105	
7	1	Stefan Bötticher	Germany		Q
7	2	Daniel Rochna	Poland	+0.921	
8	1	Rayan Helal	France		Q
8	2	Jair Tjon En Fa	Suriname	+0.114	

=== Quarterfinals ===
The quarterfinals were started on 23 October at 17:52. Matches were raced in a best-of-three format hereon; winners proceeded to the semifinals.

Heat	Rank	Name	Nation	Race 1	Race 2	Decider (i.r.)	Notes
1	1	Harrie Lavreysen	Netherlands	X	X		Q
1	2	Rayan Helal	France	+0.112	+1.482		
2	1	Stefan Bötticher	Germany	+0.772	X	X	Q
2	2	Nicholas Paul	Trinidad and Tobago	X	+0.009	+0.037	
3	1	Jeffrey Hoogland	Netherlands	+0.001	X	X	Q
3	2	Mikhail Iakovlev	Russian Cycling Federation	X	+0.155	+0.346	
4	1	Sébastien Vigier	France	X	X		Q
4	2	Mateusz Rudyk	Poland	+0.101	+0.852		

=== Semifinals ===
The semifinals were started on 24 October at 13:00. Matches were raced in a best-of-three format hereon; winners proceeded to the final, losers to the bronze medal race.

Heat	Rank	Name	Nation	Race 1	Race 2	Decider (i.r.)	Notes
1	1	Harrie Lavreysen	Netherlands	X	X		Q
1	2	Sébastien Vigier	France	+0.087	+0.248		
2	1	Jeffrey Hoogland	Netherlands	+2.493	X	X	Q
2	2	Stefan Bötticher	Germany	X	+0.096	+0.085	

=== Finals ===
The finals were started on 24 October at 14:27. Matches were raced in a best-of-three format hereon.

Rank	Name	Nation	Race 1	Race 2	Decider (i.r.)
Gold medal race
1st place, gold medalist(s)	Harrie Lavreysen	Netherlands	X	X	
2nd place, silver medalist(s)	Jeffrey Hoogland	Netherlands	+0.152	+0.178	
Bronze medal race
3rd place, bronze medalist(s)	Sébastien Vigier	France	X	+0.035	X
4	Stefan Bötticher	Germany	REL	X	+0.044

== See also ==
- 2021 UCI Track Cycling World Championships – Women's sprint
