= 2025 UCI Track Cycling World Championships – Men's 1 km time trial =

Men's 1 km time trial at the 2025 UCI Track Cycling World Championships
- Venue: Velódromo Peñalolén
- Location: Santiago, Chile
- Dates: 24 October
- Competitors: 30 from 23 nations
- Winning time: 57.978

Medalists
gold medal	Harrie Lavreysen	Netherlands
silver medal	Jeffrey Hoogland	Netherlands
bronze medal	Joseph Truman	Great Britain

The Men's 1 km time trial competition at the 2025 UCI Track Cycling World Championships was held on 24 October 2025.

== Results ==
=== Qualifying ===
The qualifying was started at 11:00. The top eight riders qualified for the final.

Rank	Name	Nation	Time	Behind	Notes
1	Harrie Lavreysen	Netherlands	57.681		Q
2	Joseph Truman	Great Britain	58.807	+1.126	Q
3	Jeffrey Hoogland	Netherlands	58.962	+1.281	Q
4	Tayte Ryan	Australia	59.304	+1.623	Q
5	Henric Hackmann	Germany	59.721	+2.040	Q
6	David Peterka	Czech Republic	59.870	+2.189	Q
7	Cristian Ortega	Colombia	59.879	+2.198	Q
8	Kirill Kurdidi	Kazakhstan	1:00.014	+2.333	Q
9	Ryuto Ichida	Japan	1:00.046	+2.365	
10	Maximilian Dörnbach	Germany	1:00.190	+2.509	
11	Matteo Bianchi	Italy	1:00.197	+2.516	
12	Nicholas Paul	Trinidad and Tobago	1:00.206	+2.525	
13	Minato Nakaishi	Japan	1:00.226	+2.545	
14	Dominik Topinka	Czech Republic	1:00.229	+2.548	
15	Mattia Predomo	Italy	1:00.244	+2.563	
16	Ryan Dodyk	Canada	1:00.301	+2.620	
17	James Hedgcock	Canada	1:00.336	+2.655	
18	Choi Tae-ho	South Korea	1:00.465	+2.784	
19	Santiago Ramírez	Colombia	1:01.106	+3.425	
20	Nick Kergozou	New Zealand	1:01.394	+3.713	
21	Lucas Vilar	Argentina	1:01.416	+3.735	
22	Frederik Madsen	Denmark	1:01.428	+3.747	
23	João Vitor da Silva	Brazil	1:01.473	+3.792	
24	David Domonoske	United States	1:01.846	+4.165	
25	Edgar Verdugo	Mexico	1:01.972	+4.291	
26	Iúri Leitão	Portugal	1:02.116	+4.435	
27	Eimantas Vadapalas	Lithuania	1:02.977	+5.296	
28	Esteban Sánchez	Spain	1:03.033	+5.352	
29	Piotr Maślak	Poland	1:03.330	+5.649	
30	Roberto Castillo	Chile	1:05.722	+8.041	

=== Final ===
The final was held at 18:30.

Rank	Name	Nation	Time	Behind	Notes
1st place, gold medalist(s)	Harrie Lavreysen	Netherlands	57.978		
2nd place, silver medalist(s)	Jeffrey Hoogland	Netherlands	58.163	+0.185	
3rd place, bronze medalist(s)	Joseph Truman	Great Britain	59.268	+1.290	
4	Henric Hackmann	Germany	59.410	+1.432	
5	Tayte Ryan	Australia	59.629	+1.651	
6	Cristian Ortega	Colombia	59.635	+1.657	
7	David Peterka	Czech Republic	1:00.038	+2.060	
8	Kirill Kurdidi	Kazakhstan	1:00.228	+2.250	
