= 2024 UEC European Track Championships – Men's sprint =

Men's sprint at the 2024 UEC European Track Championships
- Venue: Omnisport Apeldoorn, Apeldoorn
- Date: 12–13 January
- Competitors: 28 from 16 nations

Medalists
gold medal	Harrie Lavreysen	Netherlands
silver medal	Mateusz Rudyk	Poland
bronze medal	Mikhail Yakovlev	Israel

The men's sprint competition at the 2024 UEC European Track Championships was held on 12 and 13 January 2024.

== Results ==
=== Qualifying ===
The top 4 riders qualified for the 1/8 finals, 5th to 28th places qualified for the 1/16 finals.

Rank	Name	Nation	Time	Behind	Notes
1	Harrie Lavreysen	Netherlands	9.366		Q
2	Mateusz Rudyk	Poland	9.584	+0.218	Q
3	Mikhail Yakovlev	Israel	9.584	+0.218	Q
4	Jeffrey Hoogland	Netherlands	9.639	+0.273	Q
5	Rayan Helal	France	9.706	+0.340	q
6	Martin Čechman	Czech Republic	9.722	+0.356	q
7	Sébastien Vigier	France	9.769	+0.403	q
8	Sándor Szalontay	Hungary	9.773	+0.407	q
9	Hamish Turnbull	Great Britain	9.774	+0.408	q
10	Jack Carlin	Great Britain	9.776	+0.410	q
11	Vasilijus Lendel	Lithuania	9.782	+0.416	q
12	Maximilian Dörnbach	Germany	9.862	+0.496	q
13	Luca Spiegel	Germany	9.878	+0.512	q
14	Stefano Moro	Italy	9.942	+0.576	q
15	Alejandro Martínez	Spain	9.944	+0.578	q
16	Dominik Topinka	Czech Republic	9.967	+0.601	q
17	Mattia Predomo	Italy	9.983	+0.617	q
18	Konstantinos Livanos	Greece	10.014	+0.648	q
19	Maciej Bielecki	Poland	10.028	+0.662	q
20	José Moreno	Spain	10.034	+0.668	q
21	Runar De Schrijver	Belgium	10.074	+0.708	q
22	Vladyslav Denysenko	Ukraine	10.214	+0.848	q
23	Patrik Rómeó Lovassy	Hungary	10.428	+1.062	q
24	Tjorven Mertens	Belgium	10.429	+1.063	q
25	Bohdan Danylchuk	Ukraine	10.521	+1.155	q
26	Miltiadis Charovas	Greece	10.591	+1.225	q
27	Eduard Žalar	Slovenia	10.938	+1.572	q
28	Christoffer Eriksson	Sweden	11.217	+1.851	q

=== 1/16 finals ===
Heat winners advanced to the 1/8 finals.

Heat	Rank	Name	Nation	Time	Notes
1	1	Rayan Helal	France	X	Q
1	2	Christoffer Eriksson	Sweden	+0.385	
2	1	Martin Čechman	Czech Republic	X	Q
2	2	Eduard Žalar	Slovenia	+2.278	
3	1	Sébastien Vigier	France	X	Q
3	2	Miltiadis Charovas	Greece	+0.108	
4	1	Sándor Szalontay	Hungary	X	Q
4	2	Bohdan Danylchuk	Ukraine	+0.106	
5	1	Hamish Turnbull	Great Britain	X	Q
5	2	Tjorven Mertens	Belgium	+0.142	
6	1	Jack Carlin	Great Britain	X	Q
6	2	Patrik Rómeó Lovassy	Hungary	+0.470	
7	1	Vasilijus Lendel	Lithuania	X	Q
7	2	Vladyslav Denysenko	Ukraine	+0.000	
8	1	Maximilian Dörnbach	Germany	X	Q
8	2	Runar De Schrijver	Belgium	+0.042	
9	1	Luca Spiegel	Germany	X	Q
9	2	José Moreno	Spain	+0.037	
10	1	Stefano Moro	Italy	X	Q
10	2	Maciej Bielecki	Poland	+0.045	
11	1	Alejandro Martínez	Spain	X	Q
11	2	Konstantinos Livanos	Greece	+22:35.67	
12	1	Dominik Topinka	Czech Republic	X	Q
12	2	Mattia Predomo	Italy	+0.783	

=== 1/8 finals ===
Heat winners advanced to the quarterfinals.

Heat	Rank	Name	Nation	Time	Notes
1	1	Harrie Lavreysen	Netherlands	X	Q
1	2	Dominik Topinka	Czech Republic	+0.087	
2	1	Mateusz Rudyk	Poland	X	Q
2	2	Alejandro Martínez	Spain	+0.858	
3	1	Mikhail Yakovlev	Israel	X	Q
3	2	Stefano Moro	Italy	+1.257	
4	1	Jeffrey Hoogland	Netherlands	X	Q
4	2	Luca Spiegel	Germany	+0.249	
5	1	Rayan Helal	France	X	Q
5	2	Maximilian Dörnbach	Germany	+0.236	
6	1	Vasilijus Lendel	Lithuania	X	Q
6	2	Martin Čechman	Czech Republic	+0.000	
7	1	Sébastien Vigier	France	X	Q
7	2	Jack Carlin	Great Britain	+0.022	
8	1	Hamish Turnbull	Great Britain	X	Q
8	2	Sándor Szalontay	Hungary	+0.083	

=== Quarterfinals ===
Heat winners advanced to the semifinals.

Heat	Rank	Name	Nation	Race 1	Race 2	Decider (i.r.)	Notes
1	1	Harrie Lavreysen	Netherlands	X	X		Q
1	2	Hamish Turnbull	Great Britain	+0.125	+0.101		
2	1	Mateusz Rudyk	Poland	X	X		Q
2	2	Sébastien Vigier	France	+0.561	+0.197		
3	1	Mikhail Yakovlev	Israel	X	X		Q
3	2	Vasilijus Lendel	Lithuania	+0.120	+0.065		
4	1	Jeffrey Hoogland	Netherlands	X	X		Q
4	2	Rayan Helal	France	+0.038	+0.050		

=== Semifinals ===
Winners proceed to the gold medal final; losers proceed to the bronze medal final.

Heat	Rank	Name	Nation	Race 1	Race 2	Decider (i.r.)	Notes
1	1	Harrie Lavreysen	Netherlands	X	X		QG
1	2	Jeffrey Hoogland	Netherlands	+0.256	+0.266		QB
2	1	Mateusz Rudyk	Poland	X	X		QG
2	2	Mikhail Yakovlev	Israel	+0.018	+0.143		QB

=== Finals ===
Rank	Name	Nation	Race 1	Race 2	Decider (i.r.)
Gold medal final
1st place, gold medalist(s)	Harrie Lavreysen	Netherlands	X	X	
2nd place, silver medalist(s)	Mateusz Rudyk	Poland	+0.111	+0.119	
Bronze medal final
3rd place, bronze medalist(s)	Mikhail Yakovlev	Israel	X	X	
4	Jeffrey Hoogland	Netherlands	+0.074	+0.006	
