= 2019 UEC European Track Championships – Men's sprint =

Men's sprint at the 2019 UEC European Track Championships
- Venue: Omnisport Apeldoorn, Apeldoorn
- Date: 17–18 October
- Competitors: 24 from 14 nations

Medalists
gold medal	Jeffrey Hoogland	Netherlands
silver medal	Harrie Lavreysen	Netherlands
bronze medal	Mateusz Rudyk	Poland

The men's sprint competition at the 2019 UEC European Track Championships was held on 17 and 18 October 2019.

== Results ==
=== Qualifying ===
The top 8 riders qualified for the 1/8 finals, 9th to 24th places qualified for the 1/16 finals.

Rank	Name	Nation	Time	Behind	Notes
1	Jeffrey Hoogland	Netherlands	9.474		Q
2	Harrie Lavreysen	Netherlands	9.510	+0.036	Q
3	Mateusz Rudyk	Poland	9.677	+0.203	Q
4	Denis Dmitriev	Russia	9.704	+0.23	Q
5	Pavel Yakushevskiy	Russia	9.719	+0.245	Q
6	Sebastien Vigier	France	9.732	+0.258	Q
7	Joseph Truman	Great Britain	9.765	+0.291	Q
8	Pavel Kelemen	Czech Republic	9.805	+0.331	Q
9	Rayan Helal	France	9.865	+0.391	q
10	Vasilijus Lendel	Lithuania	9.879	+0.405	q
11	Jack Carlin	Great Britain	9.888	+0.414	q
12	Eric Engler	Germany	9.938	+0.464	q
13	Sándor Szalontay	Hungary	9.981	+0.507	q
14	Juan Peralta	Spain	9.993	+0.519	q
15	Martin Čechman	Czech Republic	9.999	+0.525	q
16	José Moreno	Spain	10.035	+0.561	q
17	Maximilian Dörnbach	Germany	10.040	+0.566	q
18	Rafał Sarnecki	Poland	10.135	+0.661	q
19	Norbert Szabo	Romania	10.191	+0.717	q
20	Francesco Ceci	Italy	10.200	+0.726	q
21	Svajūnas Jonauskas	Lithuania	10.216	+0.742	q
22	Artsiom Zaitsau	Belarus	10.347	+0.873	q
23	Dmytro Stovbetskyi	Ukraine	10.535	+1.061	q
24	Oleksandr Moshchonskyi	Ukraine	10.765	+1.291	q

=== 1/16 finals ===
Heat winners advanced to the 1/8 finals.

Heat	Rank	Name	Nation	Time	Notes
1	1	Rayan Helal	France	10.488	Q
1	2	Oleksandr Moshchonskyi	Ukraine		
2	1	Vasilijus Lendel	Lithuania	10.290	Q
2	2	Dmytro Stovbetskyi	Ukraine		
3	1	Jack Carlin	Great Britain	10.405	Q
3	2	Artsiom Zaitsau	Belarus		
4	1	Svajūnas Jonauskas	Lithuania	10.694	Q
4	2	Eric Engler	Germany		
5	1	Sándor Szalontay	Hungary	10.548	Q
5	2	Francesco Ceci	Italy		
6	1	Juan Peralta	Spain	10.591	Q
6	2	Norbert Szabo	Romania		
7	1	Rafał Sarnecki	Poland	10.204	Q
7	2	Martin Čechman	Czech Republic		
8	1	Maximilian Dörnbach	Germany	10.362	Q
8	2	José Moreno	Spain		

=== 1/8 finals ===
Heat winners advanced to the quarterfinals.

Heat	Rank	Name	Nation	Time	Notes
1	1	Jeffrey Hoogland	Netherlands	10.530	Q
1	2	Maximilian Dörnbach	Germany		
2	1	Harrie Lavreysen	Netherlands	10.107	Q
2	2	Rafał Sarnecki	Poland		
3	1	Mateusz Rudyk	Poland	9.936	Q
3	2	Juan Peralta	Spain		
4	1	Denis Dmitriev	Russia	10.475	Q
4	2	Sándor Szalontay	Hungary		
5	1	Pavel Yakushevskiy	Russia	10.432	Q
5	2	Svajūnas Jonauskas	Lithuania		
6	1	Jack Carlin	Great Britain	10.203	Q
6	2	Sebastien Vigier	France		
7	1	Joseph Truman	Great Britain	10.399	Q
7	2	Vasilijus Lendel	Lithuania		
8	1	Rayan Helal	France	10.306	Q
8	2	Pavel Kelemen	Czech Republic		

=== Quarterfinals ===
Matches are extended to a best-of-three format hereon; winners proceed to the semifinals.

Heat	Rank	Name	Nation	Race 1	Race 2	Decider (i.r.)	Notes
1	1	Jeffrey Hoogland	Netherlands	10.031		9.844	Q
1	2	Rayan Helal	France		10.130		
2	1	Harrie Lavreysen	Netherlands	10.044	9.913		Q
2	2	Joseph Truman	Great Britain				
3	1	Mateusz Rudyk	Poland	10.192	9.904		Q
3	2	Jack Carlin	Great Britain				
4	1	Denis Dmitriev	Russia	10.955	10.260		Q
4	2	Pavel Yakushevskiy	Russia				

=== Semifinals ===
Winners proceed to the gold medal final; losers proceed to the bronze medal final.

Heat	Rank	Name	Nation	Race 1	Race 2	Decider (i.r.)	Notes
1	1	Jeffrey Hoogland	Netherlands	X	9.847		QG
1	2	Denis Dmitriev	Russia				QB
2	1	Harrie Lavreysen	Netherlands	9.788	9.728		QG
2	2	Mateusz Rudyk	Poland				QB

=== Finals ===
Rank	Name	Nation	Race 1	Race 2	Decider (i.r.)
Gold medal final
1st place, gold medalist(s)	Jeffrey Hoogland	Netherlands	9.683	9.702	
2nd place, silver medalist(s)	Harrie Lavreysen	Netherlands			
Bronze medal final
3rd place, bronze medalist(s)	Mateusz Rudyk	Poland	10.073		10.018
4	Denis Dmitriev	Russia		10.009	
