= 2019 UEC European Track Championships – Men's keirin =

Men's keirin at the 2019 UEC European Track Championships
- Venue: Omnisport Apeldoorn, Apeldoorn
- Date: 19 October
- Competitors: 25 from 14 nations

Medalists
gold medal	Harrie Lavreysen	Netherlands
silver medal	Denis Dmitriev	Russia
bronze medal	Matthijs Büchli	Netherlands

The men's keirin competition at the 2019 UEC European Track Championships was held on 19 October 2019.

== Results ==
=== First round ===
The first two riders in each heat qualified to the second round, all other riders advanced to the first round repechages.

Heat 1

Rank	Name	Nation	Notes
1	Sébastien Vigier	France	Q
2	Jason Kenny	Great Britain	Q
3	Patryk Rajkowski	Poland	
4	Vasilijus Lendel	Lithuania	
5	Pavel Yakushevskiy	Russia	
REL	Pavel Kelemen	Czech Republic	

Heat 2

Rank	Name	Nation	Notes
1	Maximilian Levy	Germany	Q
2	Juan Peralta	Spain	Q
3	Jack Carlin	Great Britain	
4	Dmytro Stovbetskyi	Ukraine	
5	Svajūnas Jonauskas	Lithuania	
6	Francesco Ceci	Italy	

Heat 3

Rank	Name	Nation	Notes
1	Matthijs Büchli	Netherlands	Q
2	Tomáš Bábek	Czech Republic	Q
3	Marc Jurczyk	Germany	
4	Uladzislau Novik	Belarus	
5	Jose Moreno	Spain	
6	Norbert Szabo	Romania	

Heat 4

Rank	Name	Nation	Notes
1	Harrie Lavreysen	Netherlands	Q
2	Rayan Helal	France	Q
3	Krzysztof Maksel	Poland	
4	Tadey-Ivan Chebanets	Ukraine	
5	Sándor Szalontay	Hungary	
6	Denis Dmitriev	Russia	
7	Artsiom Zaitsau	Belarus	

=== First round repechage ===
The first rider in each heat qualified to the second round.

Heat 1

Rank	Name	Nation	Notes
1	Patryk Rajkowski	Poland	Q
2	Jose Moreno	Spain	
3	Francesco Ceci	Italy	
4	Tadey-Ivan Chebanets	Ukraine	

Heat 2

Rank	Name	Nation	Notes
1	Jack Carlin	Great Britain	Q
2	Pavel Kelemen	Czech Republic	
3	Svajūnas Jonauskas	Lithuania	
4	Uladzislau Novik	Belarus	

Heat 3

Rank	Name	Nation	Notes
1	Denis Dmitriev	Russia	Q
2	Pavel Yakushevskiy	Russia	
3	Marc Jurczyk	Germany	
4	Dmytro Stovbetskyi	Ukraine	

Heat 4

Rank	Name	Nation	Notes
1	Krzysztof Maksel	Poland	Q
2	Vasilijus Lendel	Lithuania	
3	Sándor Szalontay	Hungary	
4	Artsiom Zaitsau	Belarus	
5	Norbert Szabo	Romania	

=== Second round ===
The first three riders in each heat qualified to final 1–6, all other riders advanced to final 7–12.

Heat 1

Rank	Name	Nation	Notes
1	Harrie Lavreysen	Netherlands	Q
2	Sébastien Vigier	France	Q
3	Tomáš Bábek	Czech Republic	Q
4	Patryk Rajkowski	Poland	
5	Krzysztof Maksel	Poland	
6	Juan Peralta	Spain	

Heat 2

Rank	Name	Nation	Notes
1	Denis Dmitriev	Russia	Q
2	Matthijs Büchli	Netherlands	Q
3	Rayan Helal	France	Q
4	Jason Kenny	Great Britain	
5	Maximilian Levy	Germany	
6	Jack Carlin	Great Britain	

=== Finals ===
Small final

Rank	Name	Nation	Notes
7	Jason Kenny	Great Britain	
8	Krzysztof Maksel	Poland	
9	Maximilian Levy	Germany	
10	Jack Carlin	Great Britain	
11	Juan Peralta	Spain	
12	Patryk Rajkowski	Poland	

Final

Rank	Name	Nation	Notes
1st place, gold medalist(s)	Harrie Lavreysen	Netherlands	
2nd place, silver medalist(s)	Denis Dmitriev	Russia	
3rd place, bronze medalist(s)	Matthijs Büchli	Netherlands	
4	Tomáš Bábek	Czech Republic	
5	Sébastien Vigier	France	
6	Rayan Helal	France	
