= 2021 UCI Track Cycling World Championships – Men's keirin =

Men's keirin at the 2021 UCI Track Cycling World Championships
- Venue: Vélodrome Couvert Régional Jean Stablinski
- Location: Roubaix, France
- Dates: 21 October
- Competitors: 25 from 18 nations

Medalists
gold medal	Harrie Lavreysen	Netherlands
silver medal	Jeffrey Hoogland	Netherlands
bronze medal	Mikhail Iakovlev

The Men's keirin competition at the 2021 UCI Track Cycling World Championships was held on 21 October 2021.

== Results ==
=== First round ===
The first round was started at 13:00. The first two riders from each heat qualified for the second round, all other riders moved to the repechages.

Heat 1

Rank	Name	Nation	Gap	Notes
1	Harrie Lavreysen	Netherlands		Q
2	Jai Angsuthasawit	Thailand	+0.307	Q
3	Alejandro Martínez	Spain	+0.402	
4	Joseph Truman	Great Britain	+0.445	
5	Hugo Barrette	Canada	+0.505	
6	Muhammad Shah Firdaus Sahrom	Malaysia	+0.632	
7	Vasilijus Lendel	Lithuania	+0.905	

Heat 3

Rank	Name	Nation	Gap	Notes
1	Jeffrey Hoogland	Netherlands		Q
2	Koyu Matsui	Japan	+0.086	Q
3	Sébastien Vigier	France	+0.162	
4	Santiago Ramírez	Colombia	+0.320	
5	Sergey Ponomaryov	Kazakhstan	+0.353	
6	Edgar Verdugo	Mexico	+1.034	

Heat 2

Rank	Name	Nation	Gap	Notes
1	Mikhail Iakovlev	Russian Cycling Federation		Q
2	Stefan Bötticher	Germany	+0.182	Q
3	Hamish Turnbull	Great Britain	+0.195	
4	Kevin Quintero	Colombia	+0.315	
5	Svajūnas Jonauskas	Lithuania	+0.359	
6	Artsiom Zaitsau	Belarus	+1.336	

Heat 4

Rank	Name	Nation	Gap	Notes
1	Nicholas Paul	Trinidad and Tobago		Q
2	Jair Tjon En Fa	Suriname	+0.030	Q
3	Joachim Eilers	Germany	+0.085	
4	Rayan Helal	France	+0.099	
5	Kento Yamasaki	Japan	+0.189	
6	Mitchell Sparrow	South Africa	+1.204	

=== First round repechage ===
The first round repechage was started at 13:52. The first rider from each heat qualified for the second round.

Heat 1

Rank	Name	Nation	Gap	Notes
1	Rayan Helal	France		Q
2	Sergey Ponomaryov	Kazakhstan	+0.053	
3	Vasilijus Lendel	Lithuania	+0.285	
4	Artsiom Zaitsau	Belarus	+0.341	
5	Alejandro Martínez	Spain	+0.719	

Heat 3

Rank	Name	Nation	Gap	Notes
1	Sébastien Vigier	France		Q
2	Kevin Quintero	Colombia	+0.098	
3	Muhammad Shah Firdaus Sahrom	Malaysia	+0.287	
4	Mitchell Sparrow	South Africa	+0.311	

Heat 2

Rank	Name	Nation	Gap	Notes
1	Hugo Barrette	Canada		Q
2	Santiago Ramírez	Colombia	+0.008	
3	Svajūnas Jonauskas	Lithuania	+0.048	
4	Hamish Turnbull	Great Britain	+1.637	

Heat 4

Rank	Name	Nation	Gap	Notes
1	Kento Yamasaki	Japan		Q
2	Joachim Eilers	Germany	+0.078	
3	Edgar Verdugo	Mexico	+0.459	
4	Joseph Truman	Great Britain	+0.489	

=== Second round ===
The second round was started at 14:35. The first three riders in each heat qualified for the final, all other riders raced for places 7 to 12.

Heat 1

Rank	Name	Nation	Gap	Notes
1	Harrie Lavreysen	Netherlands		Q
2	Nicholas Paul	Trinidad and Tobago	+0.137	Q
3	Rayan Helal	France	+0.258	Q
4	Koyu Matsui	Japan	+0.364	
5	Stefan Bötticher	Germany	+0.444	
6	Hugo Barrette	Canada	+0.504	

Heat 2

Rank	Name	Nation	Gap	Notes
1	Jeffrey Hoogland	Netherlands		Q
2	Mikhail Iakovlev	Russian Cycling Federation	+0.082	Q
3	Kento Yamasaki	Japan	+0.131	Q
4	Jair Tjon En Fa	Suriname	+0.133	
5	Sébastien Vigier	France	+0.518	
6	Jai Angsuthasawit	Thailand	+2.133	

=== Finals ===
The finals were started at 20:33.

==== Small final ====
Rank	Name	Nation	Gap	Notes
7	Stefan Bötticher	Germany		
8	Jai Angsuthasawit	Thailand	+0.146	
9	Hugo Barrette	Canada	+0.303	
10	Sébastien Vigier	France	+0.322	
11	Koyu Matsui	Japan	Did not finish	
11	Jair Tjon En Fa	Suriname	Did not finish	

==== Final ====
Rank	Name	Nation	Gap	Notes
1st place, gold medalist(s)	Harrie Lavreysen	Netherlands		
2nd place, silver medalist(s)	Jeffrey Hoogland	Netherlands	+0.070	
3rd place, bronze medalist(s)	Mikhail Iakovlev	Russian Cycling Federation	+0.101	
4	Nicholas Paul	Trinidad and Tobago	+0.177	
5	Kento Yamasaki	Japan	+0.290	
6	Rayan Helal	France	+0.310	

== See also ==
- 2021 UCI Track Cycling World Championships – Women's keirin
