= 2023 UCI Track Cycling World Championships – Men's keirin =

Men's keirin at the 2023 UCI Track Cycling World Championships
- Venue: Sir Chris Hoy Velodrome
- Location: Glasgow, United Kingdom
- Dates: 8–9 August
- Competitors: 28 from 17 nations

Medalists
gold medal	Kevin Quintero	Colombia
silver medal	Matthew Richardson	Australia
bronze medal	Shinji Nakano	Japan

The Men's keirin competition at the 2023 UCI Track Cycling World Championships was held on 8 and 9 August 2023.

== Results ==
=== First round ===
The first round was started on 8 August at 18:03. The first two riders from each heat qualified for the quarterfinals, all other riders moved to the repechages.

Heat 1

Rank	Name	Nation	Gap	Notes
1	Jack Carlin	Great Britain		Q
2	Shinji Nakano	Japan	+0.033	Q
3	Harrie Lavreysen	Netherlands	+0.037	
4	Muhammad Ridwan Sahrom	Malaysia	+0.203	
5	Mikhail Iakovlev	Israel	+0.254	

Heat 3

Rank	Name	Nation	Gap	Notes
1	Azizulhasni Awang	Malaysia		Q
2	Hamish Turnbull	Great Britain	+0.222	Q
3	Sergey Ponomaryov	Kazakhstan	+0.299	
4	Sam Dakin	New Zealand	+0.373	
5	Sébastien Vigier	France	+0.412	
6	Esow Alben	India	+0.624	

Heat 5

Rank	Name	Nation	Gap	Notes
1	Matthew Glaetzer	Australia		Q
2	Jeffrey Hoogland	Netherlands	+0.028	Q
3	Muhammad Shah Firdaus Sahrom	Malaysia	+0.114	
4	Marc Jurczyk	Germany	+0.529	
5	James Hedgcock	Canada	+0.554	
6	Jean Spies	South Africa	+0.699	

Heat 2

Rank	Name	Nation	Gap	Notes
1	Kevin Quintero	Colombia		Q
2	Kaiya Ota	Japan	+0.066	Q
3	Jai Angsuthasawit	Thailand	+0.124	
4	Nicholas Paul	Trinidad and Tobago	+0.192	
5	Matthew Richardson	Australia	+0.314	

Heat 4

Rank	Name	Nation	Gap	Notes
1	Jaïr Tjon En Fa	Suriname		Q
2	Maximilian Dörnbach	Germany	+0.158	Q
3	Kwesi Browne	Trinidad and Tobago	+0.205	
4	Santiago Ramírez	Colombia	+0.302	
5	Thomas Cornish	Australia	+0.663	
6	Tijmen van Loon	Netherlands	+0.804	

=== First round repechage ===
The first round was started on 8 August at 19:19. The first two riders from each heat qualified for the quarterfinals.

Heat 1

Rank	Name	Nation	Gap	Notes
1	Harrie Lavreysen	Netherlands		Q
2	Sam Dakin	New Zealand	+0.340	Q
3	Jean Spies	South Africa	+0.377	
	Santiago Ramírez	Colombia	+25.054	

Heat 3

Rank	Name	Nation	Gap	Notes
1	Mikhail Iakovlev	Israel		Q
2	Thomas Cornish	Australia	+0.388	Q
3	Kwesi Browne	Trinidad and Tobago	+0.506	
4	Muhammad Ridwan Sahrom	Malaysia	+0.522	
5	Esow Alben	India	+0.685	

Heat 2

Rank	Name	Nation	Gap	Notes
1	Matthew Richardson	Australia		Q
2	Marc Jurczyk	Germany	+0.140	Q
3	Jai Angsuthasawit	Thailand	+0.240	
4	James Hedgcock	Canada	+1.533	

Heat 4

Rank	Name	Nation	Gap	Notes
1	Sébastien Vigier	France		Q
2	Tijmen van Loon	Netherlands	+0.051	Q
3	Muhammad Shah Firdaus Sahrom	Malaysia	+0.123	
4	Nicholas Paul	Trinidad and Tobago	+0.123	
5	Sergey Ponomaryov	Kazakhstan	+0.298	

=== Quarterfinals ===
The quarterfinals started on 9 August at 18:01. The first four riders from each heat qualified for the semifinals.

Heat 1

Rank	Name	Nation	Gap	Notes
1	Matthew Richardson	Australia		Q
2	Jack Carlin	Great Britain	+0.009	Q
3	Kaiya Ota	Japan	+0.096	Q
4	Mikhail Iakovlev	Israel	+0.303	Q
5	Jaïr Tjon En Fa	Suriname	+0.351	
6	Tijmen van Loon	Netherlands	+0.470	

Heat 3

Rank	Name	Nation	Gap	Notes
1	Jeffrey Hoogland	Netherlands		Q
2	Shinji Nakano	Japan	+0.000	Q
3	Azizulhasni Awang	Malaysia	+0.145	Q
4	Thomas Cornish	Australia	+0.228	Q
5	Sam Dakin	New Zealand	+0.314	
6	Maximilian Dörnbach	Germany	+1.063	

Heat 2

Rank	Name	Nation	Gap	Notes
1	Harrie Lavreysen	Netherlands		Q
2	Kevin Quintero	Colombia	+0.027	Q
3	Hamish Turnbull	United Kingdom	+0.156	Q
4	Matthew Glaetzer	Australia	+0.170	Q
5	Sébastien Vigier	France	+0.282	
6	Marc Jurczyk	Germany	+0.409	

=== Semifinals ===
The Semifinals was started on 9 August at 18:41. The first three riders in each heat qualified for the final, all other riders raced for places 7 to 12.

Heat 1

Rank	Name	Nation	Gap	Notes
1	Kevin Quintero	Colombia		Q
2	Jack Carlin	Great Britain	+0.001	Q
3	Harrie Lavreysen	Netherlands	+0.056	Q
4	Azizulhasni Awang	Malaysia	+0.089	
5	Kaiya Ota	Japan	+0.165	
6	Thomas Cornish	Australia	+0.218	

Heat 2

Rank	Name	Nation	Gap	Notes
1	Matthew Richardson	Australia		Q
2	Shinji Nakano	Japan	+0.083	Q
3	Jeffrey Hoogland	Netherlands	+0.135	Q
4	Matthew Glaetzer	Australia	+0.161	
5	Mikhail Iakovlev	Israel	+0.294	
6	Hamish Turnbull	United Kingdom	+0.582	

=== Finals ===
The Finals were started on 9 August at 20:11.

==== Small final ====
Rank	Name	Nation	Gap	Notes
7	Matthew Glaetzer	Australia		
8	Kaiya Ota	Japan	+0.006	
9	Azizulhasni Awang	Malaysia	+0.091	
10	Thomas Cornish	Australia	+0.375	
11	Mikhail Iakovlev	Israel	+0.383	
12	Hamish Turnbull	United Kingdom	+0.534	

==== Final ====
Rank	Name	Nation	Gap	Notes
1st place, gold medalist(s)	Kevin Quintero	Colombia		
2nd place, silver medalist(s)	Matthew Richardson	Australia	+0.214	
3rd place, bronze medalist(s)	Shinji Nakano	Japan	+0.252	
4	Harrie Lavreysen	Netherlands	+0.329	
5	Jack Carlin	United Kingdom	+0.397	
6	Jeffrey Hoogland	Netherlands	+0.622	
