= Harrie Lavreysen =

Dutch cyclist (born 1997)

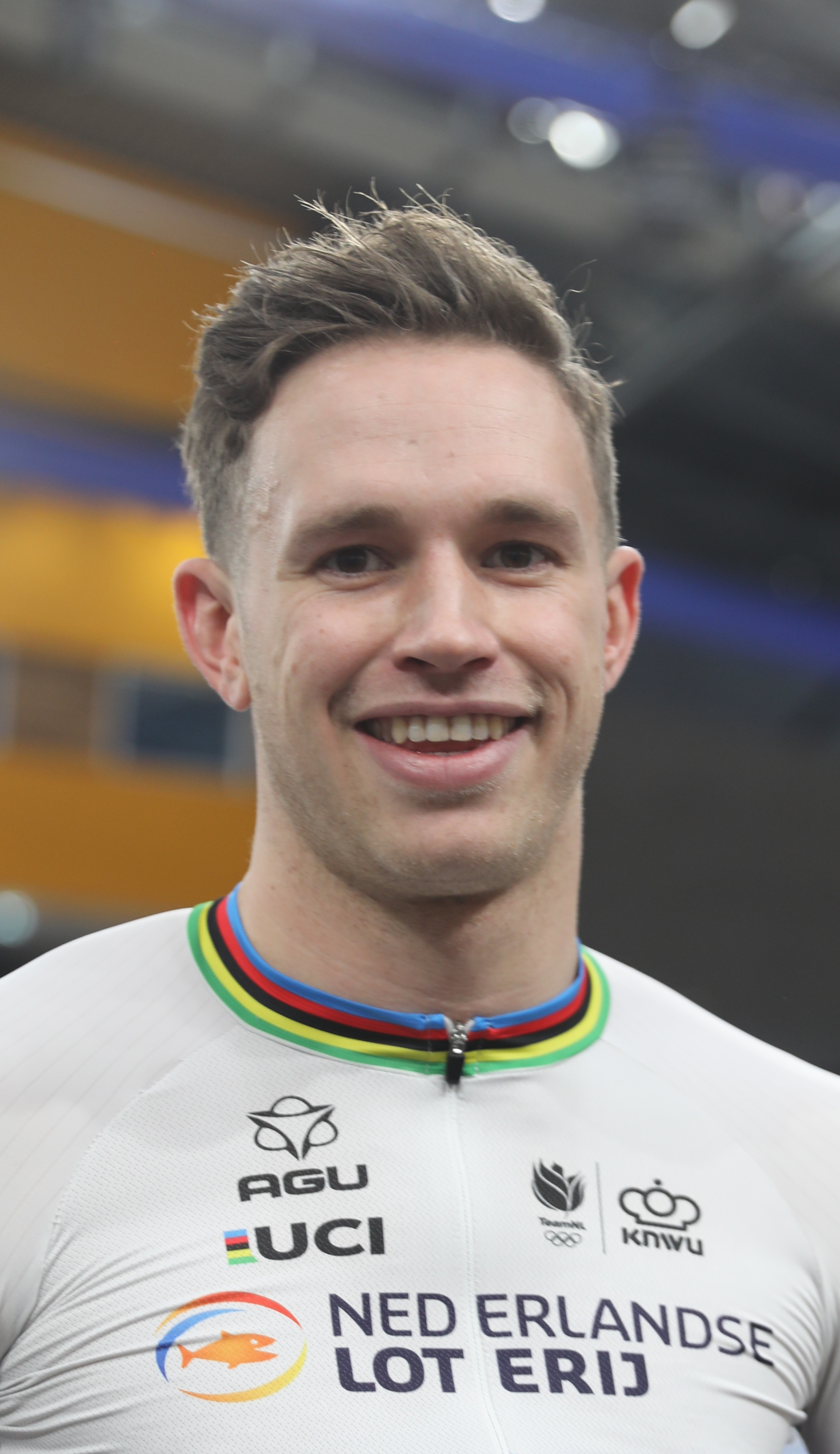
- Lavreysen in 2024

Personal information
- Born: 14 March 1997 (age 29) Luyksgestel, Netherlands
- Height: 1.80 m (5 ft 11 in)
- Weight: 92 kg (203 lb)

Cycling career
- Sport: Cycling
- Discipline: Track
- Role: Rider
- Rider type: Sprinter
Medal record
Men's track cycling
Representing the Netherlands
Event	1st	2nd	3rd
Olympic Games	5	0	1
World Championships	23	3	0
European Championships	14	4	2
European Games	2	1	0
Dutch Track Championships	13	5	3
Total	57	13	6
Olympic Games
Gold medal – first place	2020 Tokyo	Sprint
Gold medal – first place	2020 Tokyo	Team sprint
Gold medal – first place	2024 Paris	Sprint
Gold medal – first place	2024 Paris	Team sprint
Gold medal – first place	2024 Paris	Keirin
Bronze medal – third place	2020 Tokyo	Keirin
World Championships
Gold medal – first place	2018 Apeldoorn	Team sprint
Gold medal – first place	2019 Pruszków	Sprint
Gold medal – first place	2019 Pruszków	Team sprint
Gold medal – first place	2020 Berlin	Sprint
Gold medal – first place	2020 Berlin	Keirin
Gold medal – first place	2020 Berlin	Team sprint
Gold medal – first place	2021 Roubaix	Sprint
Gold medal – first place	2021 Roubaix	Keirin
Gold medal – first place	2021 Roubaix	Team sprint
Gold medal – first place	2022 Saint-Quentin-en-Yvelines	Sprint
Gold medal – first place	2022 Saint-Quentin-en-Yvelines	Keirin
Gold medal – first place	2023 Glasgow	Sprint
Gold medal – first place	2023 Glasgow	Team sprint
Gold medal – first place	2024 Ballerup	Sprint
Gold medal – first place	2024 Ballerup	1 km time trial
Gold medal – first place	2024 Ballerup	Team sprint
Gold medal – first place	2025 Santiago	Sprint
Gold medal – first place	2025 Santiago	Keirin
Gold medal – first place	2025 Santiago	1 km time trial
Gold medal – first place	2025 Santiago	Team sprint
Gold medal – first place	2026 Shanghai	Sprint
Gold medal – first place	2026 Shanghai	Keirin
Gold medal – first place	2026 Shanghai	Team sprint
Silver medal – second place	2017 Hong Kong	Sprint
Silver medal – second place	2017 Hong Kong	Team sprint
Silver medal – second place	2022 Saint-Quentin-en-Yvelines	Team sprint
European Games
Gold medal – first place	2019 Minsk	Keirin
Gold medal – first place	2019 Minsk	Team sprint
Silver medal – second place	2019 Minsk	Sprint
European Championships
Gold medal – first place	2018 Glasgow	Team sprint
Gold medal – first place	2019 Apeldoorn	Keirin
Gold medal – first place	2019 Apeldoorn	Team sprint
Gold medal – first place	2021 Grenchen	Sprint
Gold medal – first place	2021 Grenchen	Team sprint
Gold medal – first place	2022 Munich	Team sprint
Gold medal – first place	2023 Grenchen	Sprint
Gold medal – first place	2023 Grenchen	Keirin
Gold medal – first place	2023 Grenchen	Team sprint
Gold medal – first place	2024 Apeldoorn	Sprint
Gold medal – first place	2024 Apeldoorn	Keirin
Gold medal – first place	2024 Apeldoorn	Team sprint
Gold medal – first place	2025 Heusden-Zolder	Sprint
Gold medal – first place	2025 Heusden-Zolder	Keirin
Silver medal – second place	2019 Apeldoorn	Sprint
Silver medal – second place	2025 Heusden-Zolder	Team sprint
Silver medal – second place	2026 Konya	Sprint
Silver medal – second place	2026 Konya	Keirin
Bronze medal – third place	2017 Berlin	Team sprint
Bronze medal – third place	2018 Glasgow	Sprint

Harrie Lavreysen (born 14 March 1997) is a Dutch track cyclist who competes in sprint events. He is a five-time Olympic gold medalist, having won the sprint and team sprint event at the 2020 Summer Olympics, and adding the sprint, the team sprint and the keirin titles at the 2024 Summer Olympics. He has won 23 World Championship titles, including eight titles in the team sprint (2018–2021, 2023–2026), eight consecutive titles in the individual sprint (2019–2026), five in the keirin (2020–2022, 2025–2026), and two (2024–2025) in the 1km time trial, making him the most successful track cyclist at World Championships of all time. His international debut was at the 2016 UEC European Track Championships in the team sprint event. He has since won 14 European Track Championship titles.

Formerly a BMX rider, he is nicknamed "The Beast".

In the UCI Track Cycling World Championships he has the record for most total gold medals (23), most gold medals in individual events (15) and most gold medals in a single edition (4 in 2025).

== Major results ==
=== Major championship results ===
Event		2017	2018	2019	2020	2021	2022	2023	2024	2025	2026
Olympic Games	Sprint	Not held				1	Not held		1	Not held	
Olympic Games	Team sprint	Not held				1	Not held		1	Not held	
Olympic Games	Keirin	Not held				3	Not held		1	Not held	
World Championships	Sprint	2	10	1	1	1	1	1	1	1	1
World Championships	Team sprint	2	1	1	1	1	2	1	1	1	1
World Championships	Kilo	—	—	—	—	—	—	—	1	1	—
World Championships	Keirin	—	6	—	1	1	1	4	8	1	1
European Championships	Sprint	—	3	2	—	1	—	1	1	1	2
European Championships	Team sprint	3	1	1	—	1	1	1	1	2	6
European Championships	Keirin	7	5	1	—	6	—	1	1	1	2

=== Track ===
2016
National Track Championships

2nd Sprint
2nd Team Sprint
3rd Keirin

2017
UCI World Championships

2nd Sprint
2nd Team Sprint

UEC European Championships

3rd Team Sprint
7th Keirin

National Track Championships

1st 1 km Time Trial
2nd Sprint
2nd Team Sprint

5th overall UCI Track Cycling World Cup – Sprint

1st Pruszków Team Sprint
1st Manchester Sprint
1st Milton Keirin

2018
UCI World Championships

1st Team Sprint
6th Keirin

UEC European Championships

1st Team Sprint
3rd Sprint
5th Keirin

National Championship

1st Keirin
2nd Team Sprint
3rd Sprint

4th overall UCI Track Cycling World Cup – Sprint

1st Milton Team Sprint
1st Berlin Team Sprint
1st London Sprint
1st London Team Sprint
2nd Saint-Quentin-en-Yvelines Sprint
2nd Milton Sprint

2019
UCI World Championships

1st Sprint
1st Team Sprint

European Games

1st Keirin
1st Team Sprint
2nd Sprint

UEC European Championships

1st Keirin
1st Team Sprint
2nd Sprint

National Championships

1st Keirin
3rd Sprint

2nd overall UCI Track Cycling World Cup – Sprint

1st Minsk Sprint
1st Minsk Keirin
1st Minsk Team Sprint
1st Glasgow Sprint
1st Glasgow Team Sprint
1st Hong Kong Sprint
1st Hong Kong Team Sprint
4th Hong Kong Keirin

2020
UCI World Championships

1st Sprint
1st Keirin
1st Team Sprint

2021
Olympic Games

1st Sprint
1st Team Sprint
3rd Keirin

UCI World Championships

1st Sprint
1st Keirin
1st Team Sprint

UEC European Championships

1st Sprint
1st Team Sprint
6th Keirin

National Championships

1st Sprint
1st Keirin

1st overall UCI Track Champions League – Sprint

1st Palma Sprint
1st Panevėžys Keirin
1st Panevėžys Sprint
1st London 1 Sprint
1st London 2 Sprint
2nd Palma Keirin
4th London 1 Keirin
2nd London 2 Keirin

2022
UCI World Championships

1st Sprint
1st Keirin
2nd Team Sprint

UEC European Championships

1st Team Sprint

National Championships

1st Sprint
1st Keirin

2nd overall UCI Track Champions League – Sprint

1st Palma Keirin
1st Berlin Keirin
1st Paris Sprint
1st London 1 Sprint
1st London 2 Sprint
2nd Palma Sprint
2nd Berlin Sprint
2nd Paris Keirin
2nd London 2 Keirin
4th London 1 Keirin

UCI Track Cycling Nations Cup

1st overall Sprint General Classification

1st Glasgow Sprint
2nd Cali Sprint

3rd overall Keirin General Classification

1st Glasgow Keirin

3rd overall Team Sprint General Classification

3rd Glasgow Team Sprint
1st Cairo Team Sprint
2nd Jakarta Team Sprint

2023
UCI World Championships

1st Sprint
1st Team Sprint
4th Keirin

UEC European Championships

1st Sprint
1st Keirin
1st Team Sprint

National Championships

1st Sprint
1st Keirin
1st 1 km Time Trial

1st overall UCI Track Champions League – Sprint

1st Palma Keirin
1st Palma Sprint
1st Berlin Keirin
1st Berlin Sprint
1st Paris Keirin
1st London 1 Sprint
1st London 2 Keirin
2nd Paris Sprint
2nd London 1 Keirin
2nd London 2 Sprint

UCI Track Cycling Nations Cup

2nd overall Sprint General Classification

1st Jakarta Sprint
1st Jakarta Keirin
1st Cairo Sprint
1st Cairo Team Sprint
2nd Jakarta Team Sprint

2024
Olympic Games

1st Sprint
1st Keirin
1st Team Sprint

UCI World Championships

1st Sprint
1st 1 km Time Trial
1st Team Sprint
8th Keirin

UEC European Championships

1st Sprint
1st Keirin
1st Team Sprint

National Championships

1st Sprint
1st Keirin

1st overall UCI Track Champions League – Sprint

1st Apeldoorn 1 Sprint
1st Apeldoorn 2 Sprint
1st London 1 Sprint
1st London 1 Keirin
1st London 2 Sprint
2nd Paris Sprint
2nd Paris Keirin
2nd Apeldoorn 1 Keirin
3rd Apeldoorn 2 Keirin

UCI Track Cycling Nations Cup

5th overall Sprint General Classification

1st Milton Sprint
1st Milton Keirin
1st Milton Team Sprint

2025
UCI World Championships

1st Sprint
1st Keirin
1st 1 km Time Trial
1st Team Sprint

UEC European Championships

1st Sprint
1st Keirin
2nd Team Sprint

National Championships

1st Sprint
1st Keirin
1st 250 m standing start

1st Sprint Cup Six Days of Rotterdam

2026
UCI World Championships

1st Sprint
1st Keirin
1st Team Sprint

UEC European Championships

2nd Sprint
2nd Keirin

== See also ==
- List of European records in track cycling
- List of World Championship medalists in men's keirin
- List of European Championship medalists in men's sprint
- List of Track Cycling Nations Cup medalists

Olympic Games
Preceded by Lois Abbingh; Worthy de Jong	Flag bearer for the Netherlands; 2024 closing ceremony With: Femke Bol	Most recent
