= Shinji Nakano (cyclist) =

Japanese cyclist (born 1999)

Personal information
- Born: 8 June 1999 (age 27) Hanamaki, Iwate, Japan
- Height: 1.76 m (5 ft 9 in)
- Weight: 83 kg (183 lb)

Cycling career
- Sport: Cycling
- Discipline: Track cycling
- Role: Rider
Medal record
Men's track cycling
Representing Japan
World Championships
Bronze medal – third place	2023 Glasgow	Keirin
Bronze medal – third place	2026 Shanghai	Keirin
Asian Games
Gold medal – first place	2022 Hangzhou	Team sprint
Asian Championships
Gold medal – first place	2025 Nilai	Team sprint
Gold medal – first place	2025 Nilai	Keirin
Silver medal – second place	2023 Nilai	Keirin
Silver medal – second place	2025 Nilai	Sprint
Silver medal – second place	2026 Tagaytay	Team sprint

Shinji Nakano (中野慎詞, Nakano Shinji; born 8 June 1999) is a Japanese track cyclist. He is also active in Japan as a keirin cyclist. He competed at the 2024 Summer Olympics in the Men's keirin in Paris on 11 August 2024.

He is not to be confused with the ex-Formula 1 driver of the same name or the similar named ex-MotoGP rider Shinya Nakano

== See also ==
- List of World Championship medalists in men's keirin
