= Lowie Nulens =

Belgian road and track cyclist

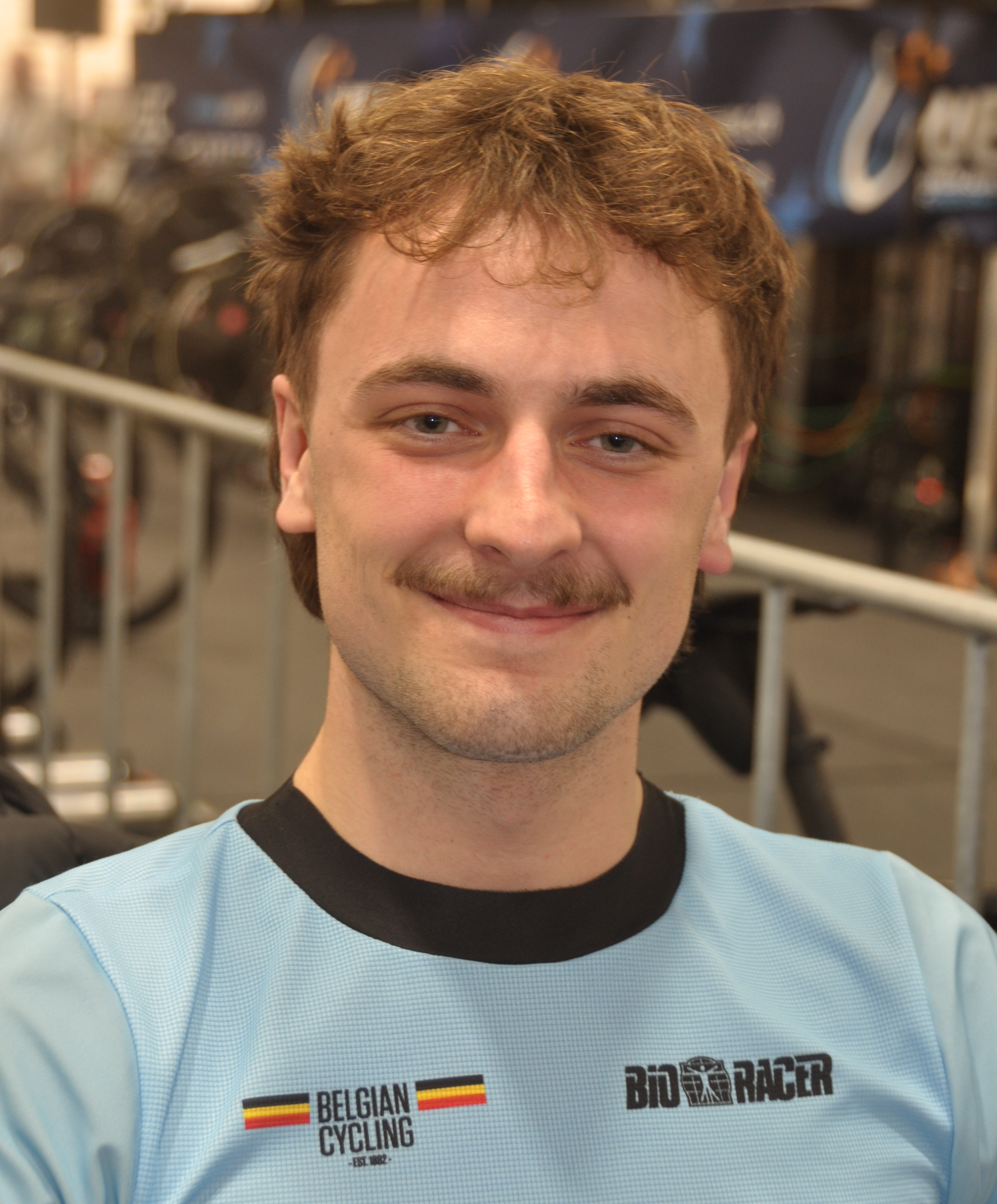
- Lowie Nulens (2025)

Personal information
- Born: 16 January 2006 (age 20)

Cycling career
- Sport: Cycling
- Discipline: Track
- Role: Rider
Medal record
Men's track cycling
Representing Belgium
European Championships
Bronze medal – third place	2026 Konya	Keirin
European Championships U23
Silver medal – second place	2025 Anadia	Sprint
Bronze medal – third place	2025 Anadia	Keirin

Lowie Nulens (January 16, 2006) is a Belgian track cyclist specialising in short-distance disciplines.

== Career ==
Lowie Nulens, nickname "The Kortessem Comet", started out in cycling as a BMX-rider. It was only after Velodroom Limburg opened near his home in Kortessem, Belgium in October 2023 that he switched to Track cycling.

Less than one year later, in August 2024, Nulens represented Belgium at the 2024 UCI Junior Track Cycling World Championships in Luoyang, China where he finished 12th in the Keirin competition and 5th in the team sprint.

In December 2024, he won his first national senior title winning the Keirin competition. Four weeks later he won the national track sprint title.

In February 2025, he finished 9th in both the men's keirin and the men's team sprint at the 2025 UEC European Track Championships on his home turf, the Velodroom Limburg. Later that year, in July 2025, he won his first international medals, winning silver and bronze resp. in the men's sprint and keirin at the 2025 UEC European Track Championships (under-23) in Anadia, Portugal. A year later, 20 years old, at the 2026 UEC European Track Championships in Konya, Turkey, Nulens won his first international medal at the senior level, taking third place in the men's keirin behind sprinting greats Matthew Richardson and Harrie Lavreysen.

== Personal life ==
Nulens studies Engineering Technology at the Hasselt University in Hasselt, Belgium.
