= Kento Yamasaki =

Japanese track cyclist

Personal information
- Born: 17 December 1992 (age 33) Nagasaki
- Height: 176 cm (5 ft 9 in)
- Weight: 78 kg (172 lb)

Cycling career
- Sport: Cycling
- Discipline: Track
- Role: Rider
- Rider type: Sprinter
Medal record
Men's track cycling
Representing Japan
World Championships
Gold medal – first place	2024 Ballerup	Keirin
Asian Championships
Gold medal – first place	2022 New Delhi	Sprint
Gold medal – first place	2024 New Delhi	Keirin
Gold medal – first place	2024 New Delhi	Team sprint
Bronze medal – third place	2023 Nilai	Sprint

Kento Yamasaki (山﨑 賢人, Yamasaki Kento)(born 17 December 1992), a Japanese racing cyclist, best known for his surprise win in the Keirin at the 2024 UCI Track Cycling World Championships in Ballerup.

Yamasaki had made his World Championship debut in 2021, finishing fifth in the Keirin, and won the individual sprint at the 2022 Asian Cycling Championships, and the Keirin at the 2024 championships. Yamasaki was Japan's first male Keirin world champion since 1987.
