= Nikita Kiriltsev =

Russian cyclist (born 2005)

- Kiriltsev in 2023

Personal information
- Born: 12 January 2005 (age 21)

Cycling career
- Sport: Cycling
- Discipline: Track
- Role: Rider
- Rider type: Sprinter
Medal record
Men's track cycling
Representing Individual Neutral Athletes
European Championships
Bronze medal – third place	2026 Konya	Sprint
European U23 Championships
Gold medal – first place	2025 Anadia	Sprint
Gold medal – first place	2025 Anadia	Keirin
Gold medal – first place	2026 Cottbus	Keirin
Silver medal – second place	2026 Cottbus	Sprint
World Junior Championships
Gold medal – first place	2023 Cali	Sprint
Gold medal – first place	2023 Cali	Keirin

Nikita Vladimirovich Kiriltsev (Russian: Никита Владимирович Кирильцев; born 12 January 2005) is a Russian track cyclist who competes as a sprinter. He was a bronze medalist in the individual sprint competing as an Authorised Neutral Athlete at the 2026 UEC European Track Championships. Prior to that, he was a double gold medalist in the sprint and keirin at the 2023 UCI Junior Track Cycling World Championships and 2025 UEC European U23 Track Championships.

== Career ==
He won gold medals in the keirin and individual sprint at the 2023 UCI Junior Track Cycling World Championships in Cali, Colombia. In October of that year, Kiriltsev set a junior men world record in the 200 metres time trial (9.712 seconds) at the Russian Cup. He was runner-up to Artsiom Zaitsau in the 1 kilometre time trial at the Belarus Open Track Cycling Championship the following February.

Competing as an Authorised Neutral Athlete, he reached the last-16 of the men's individual sprint at the 2025 UEC European Track Championships in Heusden-Zolder, Belgium. That year, he won gold medals in the sprint and keirin at the 2025 UEC European U23 Track Championships in Anadia, Portugal. He also competed at the 2025 UCI Track Cycling World Championships in Santiago, Chile, in the individual sprint and keirin, in which he was involved in a crash with Nicholas Paul of Trinidad and Tobago in the semi-final, causing both riders to miss the final.

He won the bronze medal competing at the 2026 UEC European Track Championships in Konya, Turkey in the men's sprint.
