= David Peterka =

Czezh cyclist

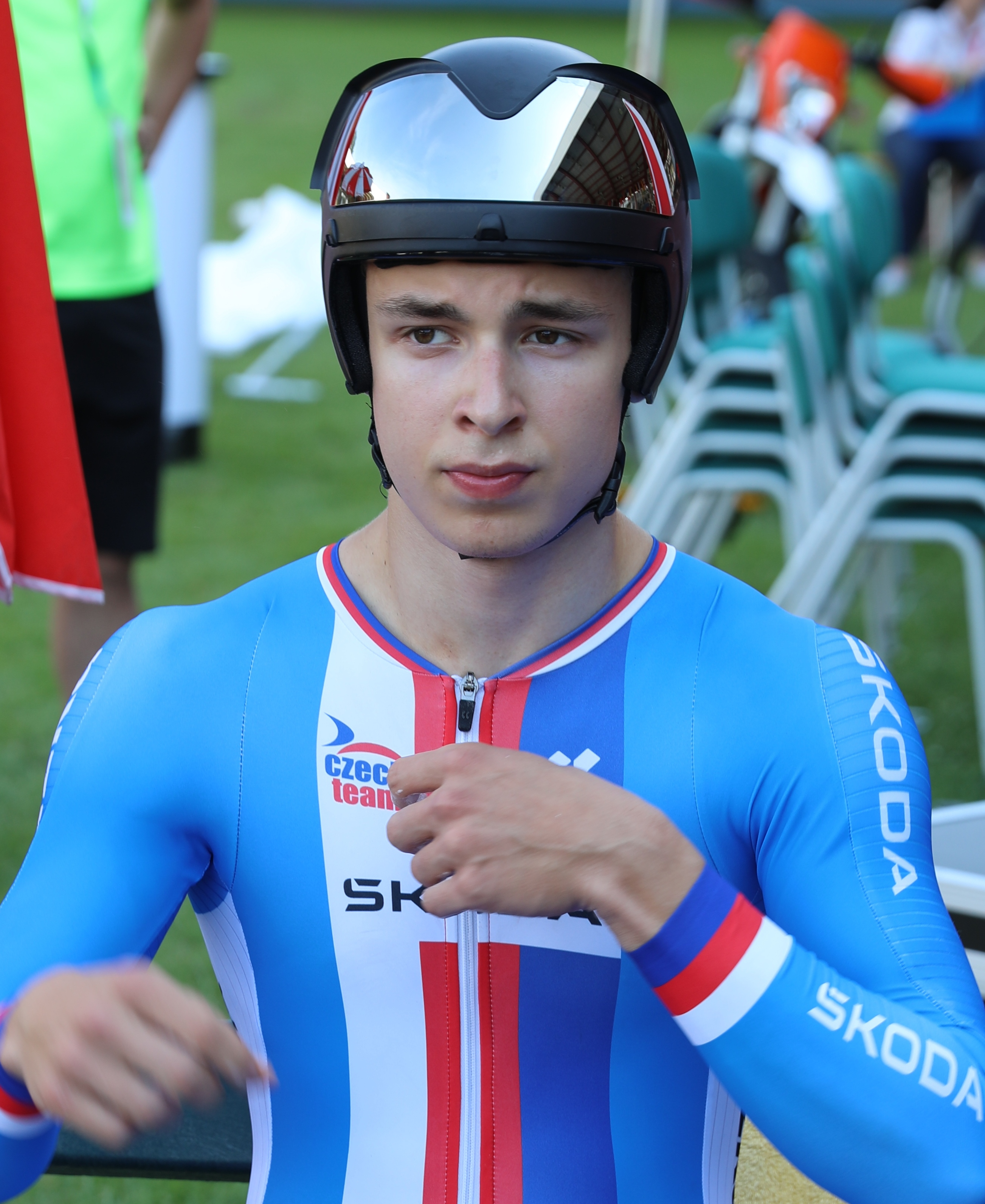
- Peterka in 2024

Personal information
- Born: 21 February 2006 (age 20)

Cycling career
- Sport: Cycling
- Discipline: Track
- Role: Rider
- Rider type: Sprinter
Medal record
Men's track cycling
Representing Czech Republic
European Championships
Bronze medal – third place	2025 Heusden-Zolder	1 km time trial
Bronze medal – third place	2026 Konya	1 km time trial
European Under-23 Championships
Silver medal – second place	2025 Anadia	Team Sprint
World Junior Championships
Gold medal – first place	2024 Luoyang	Team Sprint

David Peterka (born 21 February 2006) is a Czech track cyclist. He was a bronze medalist in the 1 km time trial at the 2025 and 2026 UEC European Track Championships.

== Career ==
From Brno, and a member of the Dukla Brno cycling club, in 2022 he underwent an operation in hospital after a heavy crash caused him to break his ribs, collarbone, a collapsed lung and crushed vertebrae.

He won bronze medals in the team sprint and the 1 km time trial at the 2024 UEC Junior European Track Championships in Cottbus.

He was a gold medalist at the 2024 UCI Junior Track Cycling World Championships in August 2024, in the team sprint.

He was a bronze medalist at the 2025 UEC European Track Championships in Heusden-Zolder in the 1km time trial in February 2025, whilst still only 18 years-old.
