= Tom Derache =

French cyclist

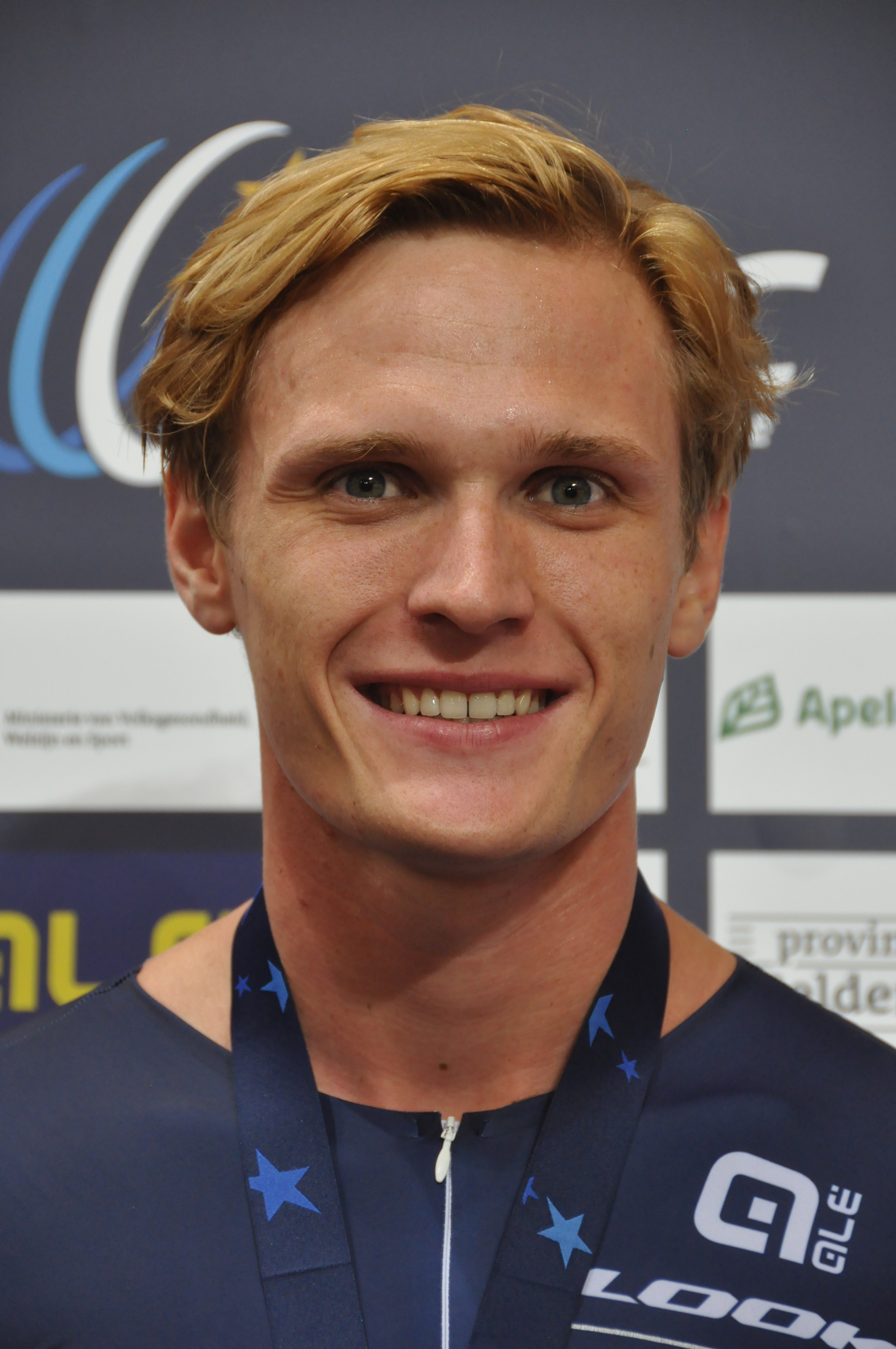
- Derache in 2021

Personal information
- Born: 29 January 1999 (age 27) Lille, France

Cycling career
- Sport: Cycling
- Discipline: Track
- Role: Rider
- Rider type: Sprinter
Medal record
Men's track cycling
Representing France
European Championships
Gold medal – first place	2026 Konya	Team sprint
Silver medal – second place	2021 Grenchen	Keirin
Bronze medal – third place	2025 Heusden-Zolder	Keirin

Tom Derache (born 29 January 1999) is a French track cyclist, who competes in sprint events.

== Major results ==
2021
National Track Championships

1st Keirin
1st Sprint

UCI Nations Cup

1st Keirin – St. Petersburg
3rd Sprint – St. Petersburg

2nd Keirin, UEC European Championships
UEC European Under-23 Championships

2nd Sprint
3rd Keirin
