= Konstantinos Livanos =

Greek cyclist (born 2000)

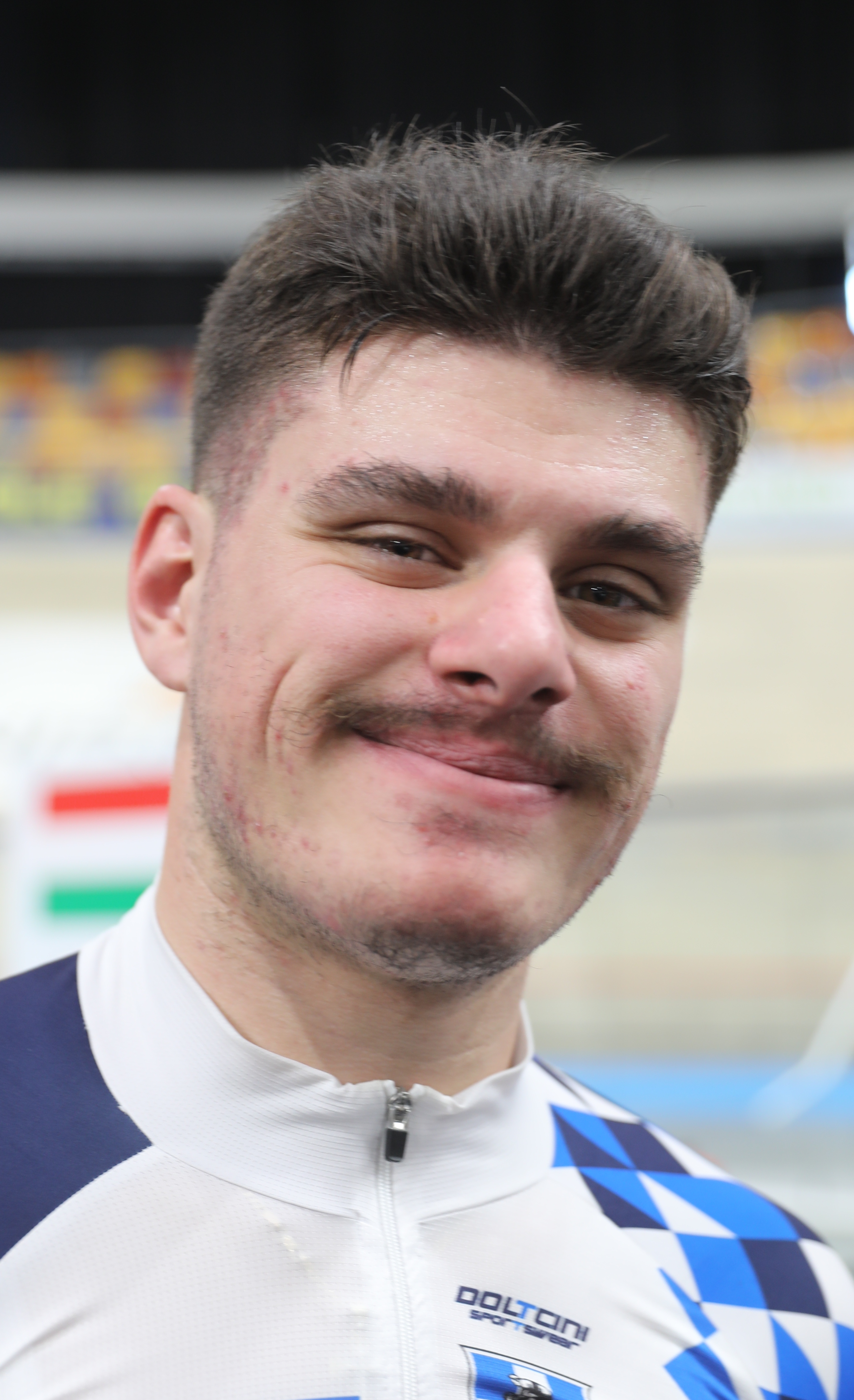
- Konstantinos Livanos in 2024

Personal information
- Born: 23 October 2000 (age 25) Chania, Greece

Cycling career
- Sport: Cycling
- Discipline: Track
- Role: Rider
- Rider type: Sprinter
Medal record
Men's track cycling
Representing Greece
European Championships
Bronze medal – third place	2020 Plovdiv	Team sprint
Junior World Championships
Gold medal – first place	2019 Frankfurt	Sprint
Gold medal – first place	2019 Frankfurt	Keirin
U23 & Junior European Championships
Gold medal – first place	2019 Ghent	Junior Sprint
Gold medal – first place	2019 Ghent	Junior 1km time trial

Konstantinos Livanos (born 23 October 2000) is a Greek track cyclist.
