= 2016 UEC European Track Championships – Men's sprint =

Men's sprint at the 2016 UEC European Track Championships
- UEC European Champion jersey
- Venue: Vélodrome de Saint-Quentin-en-Yvelines, Yvelines
- Date: 21–22 October
- Competitors: 32 from 18 nations

Medalists
gold medal	Pavel Yakushevskiy	Russia
silver medal	Roy van den Berg	Netherlands
bronze medal	Andriy Vynokurov	Ukraine

The Men's sprint was held on 21–22 October 2016.

== Results ==
=== Qualifying ===
The top 18 qualify for the match rounds.

Rank	Name	Nation	Time	Notes
1	Pavel Yakushevskiy	Russia	9.696	Q
2	Ryan Owens	Great Britain	9.752	Q
3	Sebastien Vigier	France	9.816	Q
4	Andriy Vynokurov	Ukraine	9.822	Q
5	Joseph Truman	Great Britain	9.830	Q
6	Roy van den Berg	Netherlands	9.841	Q
7	Eric Engler	Germany	9.864	Q
8	Kamil Kuczyński	Poland	9.892	Q
9	Mateusz Rudyk	Poland	9.918	Q
10	Quentin Lafargue	France	9.939	Q
11	Kirill Samusenko	Russia	9.948	Q
12	Vasilijus Lendel	Lithuania	9.949	Q
13	Jan May	Germany	9.999	Q
14	Juan Peralta	Spain	10.000	Q
15	Robin Wagner	Czech Republic	10.005	Q
16	Sandor Szalontay	Hungary	10.011	Q
17	José Moreno Sánchez	Spain	10.063	Q
18	Anargyros Sotirakopoulos	Greece	10.074	Q
19	Harrie Lavreysen	Netherlands	10.089	
20	David Sojka	Czech Republic	10.096	
21	Eoin Mullen	Ireland	10.160	
22	Zafeiris Volikakis	Greece	10.245	
23	Svajunas Jonauskas	Lithuania	10.246	
24	Davide Ceci	Italy	10.352	
25	Ayrton De Pauw	Belgium	10.396	
26	Luca Ceci	Italy	10.511	
27	Artsiom Zaitsau	Belarus	10.588	
28	Davit Askurava	Georgia	10.829	
29	Miroslav Minchev	Bulgaria	10.875	
30	Gerald Nys	Belgium	10.924	
31	Nikolay Stanchev	Bulgaria	11.744	
—	Sotirios Bretas	Greece	DNS	

=== 1/16 Finals ===
Winners proceed directly to the 1/8 finals; losers proceed to the repechage.

Heat	Rank	Name	Nation	Time	Notes
1	1	Pavel Yakushevskiy	Russia	11.052	Q
1	2	Anargyros Sotirakopoulos	Greece		
2	1	Ryan Owens	Great Britain	10.792	Q
2	2	José Moreno Sánchez	Spain		
3	1	Sebastien Vigier	France	10.447	Q
3	2	Sandor Szalontay	Hungary		
4	1	Andriy Vynokurov	Ukraine	10.371	Q
4	2	Robin Wagner	Czech Republic		
5	1	Joseph Truman	Great Britain	10.553	Q
5	2	Juan Peralta	Spain		
6	1	Roy van den Berg	Netherlands	10.436	Q
6	2	Jan May	Germany		
7	1	Eric Engler	Germany	10.401	Q
7	2	Vasilijus Lendel	Lithuania		
8	1	Kamil Kuczyński	Poland	10.427	Q
8	2	Kirill Samusenko	Russia		
9	1	Mateusz Rudyk	Poland	10.461	Q
9	2	Quentin Lafargue	France	REL	

=== 1/16 Finals Repechage ===
Winners proceed to the 1/8 finals.

Heat	Rank	Name	Nation	Time	Notes
1	1	Quentin Lafargue	France	10.576	Q
1	2	Anargyros Sotirakopoulos	Greece		
1	3	Jan May	Germany		
2	1	José Moreno Sánchez	Spain	11.354	Q
2	2	Vasilijus Lendel	Lithuania		
2	3	Juan Peralta	Spain		
3	1	Robin Wagner	Czech Republic	10.436	Q
3	2	Sandor Szalontay	Hungary		
3	3	Kirill Samusenko	Russia		

=== 1/8 Finals ===
Winners proceed directly to the quarter-finals; losers proceed to the repechage.

Heat	Rank	Name	Nation	Time	Notes
1	1	Pavel Yakushevskiy	Russia	10.379	Q
1	2	Robin Wagner	Czech Republic		
2	1	Ryan Owens	Great Britain	10.770	Q
2	2	José Moreno Sánchez	Spain		
3	1	Sebastien Vigier	France	10.402	Q
3	2	Quentin Lafargue	France		
4	1	Andriy Vynokurov	Ukraine	10.427	Q
4	2	Mateusz Rudyk	Poland		
5	1	Joseph Truman	Great Britain	10.365	Q
5	2	Kamil Kuczyński	Poland		
6	1	Roy van den Berg	Netherlands	10.329	Q
6	2	Eric Engler	Germany		

=== 1/8 Finals Repechage ===
Winners proceed to the quarter-finals; losers proceed to the race for places 9–12.

Heat	Rank	Name	Nation	Time	Notes
1	1	Eric Engler	Germany	10.856	Q
1	2	Robin Wagner	Czech Republic		
1	3	Mateusz Rudyk	Poland		
2	1	Quentin Lafargue	France	10.695	Q
2	2	Kamil Kuczyński	Poland		
2	3	José Moreno Sánchez	Spain		

=== Race for 9th place ===
This ranking final determines the allocation of places 9–12.

Rank	Name	Nation	Time
9	Robin Wagner	Czech Republic	10.742
10	José Moreno Sánchez	Spain	
11	Kamil Kuczyński	Poland	
12	Mateusz Rudyk	Poland	

=== Quarter-finals ===
One-on-one matches are extended to a 'best of three' format hereon. Winners proceed to the semi-finals; losers proceed to the race for places 5–8.

Heat	Rank	Name	Nation	Race 1	Race 2	Decider	Notes
1	1	Pavel Yakushevskiy	Russia	10.320	10.621		Q
1	2	Quentin Lafargue	France				
2	1	Eric Engler	Germany	10.587	10.063		Q
2	2	Ryan Owens	Great Britain				
3	1	Roy van den Berg	Netherlands	10.506	10.557		Q
3	2	Sebastien Vigier	France				
4	1	Andriy Vynokurov	Ukraine	10.284	10.272		Q
4	2	Joseph Truman	Great Britain				

=== Race for 5th place ===
This ranking final determines the allocation of places 5–8.

Rank	Name	Nation	Time
5	Sebastien Vigier	France	10.238
6	Quentin Lafargue	France	
7	Ryan Owens	Great Britain	
8	Joseph Truman	Great Britain	

=== Semi-finals ===
Winners proceed to the gold medal final; losers proceed to the bronze medal final.

Heat	Rank	Name	Nation	Race 1	Race 2	Decider	Notes
1	1	Pavel Yakushevskiy	Russia		10.397	10.202	Q
1	2	Andriy Vynokurov	Ukraine	10.389			
2	1	Roy van den Berg	Netherlands	10.496		10.438	Q
2	2	Eric Engler	Germany		10.364	REL	

=== Finals ===
The final classification is determined in the medal finals.

Rank	Name	Nation	Race 1	Race 2	Decider
Bronze medal final
3rd place, bronze medalist(s)	Andriy Vynokurov	Ukraine	10.303	10.287	
4	Eric Engler	Germany		REL	
Gold medal final
1st place, gold medalist(s)	Pavel Yakushevskiy	Russia	10.495	10.970	
2nd place, silver medalist(s)	Roy van den Berg	Netherlands			
