= 2015 UEC European Track Championships – Men's keirin =

Men's keirin at the 2015 UEC European Track Championships
- UEC European Champion jersey
- Venue: Velodrome Suisse, Grenchen
- Date: 18 October
- Competitors: 32 from 19 nations

Medalists
gold medal	Pavel Kelemen	Czech Republic
silver medal	François Pervis	France
bronze medal	Denis Dmitriev	Russia

The Men's keirin was held on 18 October 2015.

== Results ==
=== First round ===
Heat winners qualified directly for the second round; the remainder went to the first round repechage.

==== Heat 1 ====
Rank	Name	Nation	Gap	Notes
1	Joachim Eilers	Germany		Q
2	Sergii Omelchenko	Azerbaijan	+0.130	
3	Zafeiris Volikakis	Greece	+0.434	
4	Vasilijus Lendel	Lithuania	+0.443	
5	Artsiom Zaitsau	Belarus	+2.115	

==== Heat 3 ====
Rank	Name	Nation	Gap	Notes
1	Christos Volikakis	Greece		Q
2	Hugo Haak	Netherlands	+0.013	
3	Tomáš Bábek	Czech Republic	+0.061	
4	Svajunas Jonauskas	Lithuania	+0.460	
5	Luca Ceci	Italy	+0.921	

==== Heat 5 ====
Rank	Name	Nation	Gap	Notes
1	Mateusz Lipa	Poland		Q
2	Maximilian Dornbach	Germany	+0.007	
3	Matthijs Büchli	Netherlands	+0.184	
4	Miroslav Minchev	Bulgaria	+0.232	
5	François Pervis	France	+1.060	
6	Sergio Aliaga	Spain	+1.321	

==== Heat 2 ====
Rank	Name	Nation	Gap	Notes
1	Nikita Shurshin	Russia		Q
2	Sandor Szalontay	Hungary	+0.127	
3	José Moreno Sánchez	Spain	+0.304	
4	Francesco Ceci	Italy	+0.418	
5	Volodymyr Buchynskyy	Ukraine	+0.471	

==== Heat 4 ====
Rank	Name	Nation	Gap	Notes
1	Pavel Kelemen	Czech Republic		Q
2	Jason Kenny	Great Britain	+0.071	
3	Andriy Vynokurov	Ukraine	+0.077	
4	Eoin Mullen	Ireland	+0.209	
5	Jani Mikkonen	Finland	+1.248	

==== Heat 6 ====
Rank	Name	Nation	Gap	Notes
1	Krzysztof Maksel	Poland		Q
2	Denis Dmitriev	Russia	+0.042	
3	Michaël D'Almeida	France	+0.117	
4	Matthew Crampton	Great Britain	+0.204	
5	Davit Askurava	Georgia	+1.040	
6	Uladzislau Novik	Belarus	+1.769	

=== First round Repechage ===
Heat winners qualified for the second round.

==== Heat 1 ====
Rank	Name	Nation	Gap	Notes
1	Michaël D'Almeida	France		Q
2	Sergii Omelchenko	Azerbaijan	+0.015	
3	Miroslav Minchev	Bulgaria	+0.275	
4	Jani Mikkonen	Finland	+0.958	

==== Heat 3 ====
Rank	Name	Nation	Gap	Notes
1	François Pervis	France		Q
2	Hugo Haak	Netherlands	+0.039	
3	Luca Ceci	Italy	+0.644	
4	Davit Askurava	Georgia	+0.720	

==== Heat 5 ====
Rank	Name	Nation	Gap	Notes
1	Sergio Aliaga	Spain		Q
2	Volodymyr Buchynskyy	Ukraine	+0.115	
3	Matthew Crampton	Great Britain	+0.148	
4	Artsiom Zaitsau	Belarus	+0.522	
5	Vasilijus Lendel	Lithuania	+0.805	

==== Heat 2 ====
Rank	Name	Nation	Gap	Notes
1	Tomáš Bábek	Czech Republic		Q
2	Matthijs Büchli	Netherlands	+0.149	
3	Sandor Szalontay	Hungary	DNF	
3	Eoin Mullen	Ireland	DNF	

==== Heat 4 ====
Rank	Name	Nation	Gap	Notes
1	Denis Dmitriev	Russia		Q
2	Andriy Vynokurov	Ukraine	+0.135	
3	Francesco Ceci	Italy	+0.227	
4	Zafeiris Volikakis	Greece	+0.246	

==== Heat 6 ====
Rank	Name	Nation	Gap	Notes
1	Jason Kenny	Great Britain		Q
2	José Moreno Sánchez	Spain	+0.067	
3	Svajunas Jonauskas	Lithuania	+0.807	
4	Maximilian Dornbach	Germany	+0.840	
—	Uladzislau Novik	Belarus	DSQ	

=== Second round ===
First three riders in each semi qualified for the final; the remainder went to the small final (for places 7-12).

==== Semi-final 1 ====
Rank	Name	Nation	Gap	Notes
1	François Pervis	France		Q
2	Michaël D'Almeida	France	+0.064	Q
3	Tomáš Bábek	Czech Republic	+0.156	Q
4	Nikita Shurshin	Russia	+0.158	
5	Christos Volikakis	Greece	+0.197	
6	Joachim Eilers	Germany	+0.250	

==== Semi-final 2 ====
Rank	Name	Nation	Gap	Notes
1	Krzysztof Maksel	Poland		Q
2	Denis Dmitriev	Russia	+0.024	Q
3	Pavel Kelemen	Czech Republic	+0.067	Q
4	Jason Kenny	Great Britain	+0.156	
5	Mateusz Lipa	Poland	+0.182	
6	Sergio Aliaga	Spain	+0.452	

=== Finals ===
The final classification is determined in the ranking finals.

==== Final (places 7-12) ====
Rank	Name	Nation	Gap	Notes
7	Christos Volikakis	Greece		
8	Jason Kenny	Great Britain	+0.079	
9	Nikita Shurshin	Russia	+0.084	
10	Sergio Aliaga	Spain	+0.247	
11	Mateusz Lipa	Poland	+1.280	
12	Joachim Eilers	Germany	DNF	

==== Final (places 1-6) ====
Rank	Name	Nation	Gap	Notes
1st place, gold medalist(s)	Pavel Kelemen	Czech Republic		
2nd place, silver medalist(s)	François Pervis	France	+0.047	
3rd place, bronze medalist(s)	Denis Dmitriev	Russia	+0.057	
4	Krzysztof Maksel	Poland	+0.082	
5	Michaël D'Almeida	France	+0.112	
6	Tomáš Bábek	Czech Republic	+0.213	
