= 2018 UEC European Track Championships – Men's keirin =

Men's keirin at the 2018 UEC European Track Championships
- Venue: Sir Chris Hoy Velodrome, Glasgow
- Date: 7 August
- Competitors: 27 from 17 nations

Medalists
gold medal	Stefan Bötticher	Germany
silver medal	Sébastien Vigier	France
bronze medal	Jack Carlin	Great Britain

The men's keirin competition at the 2018 UEC European Track Championships was held on 7 August 2018.

== Results ==
=== First round ===
The first two riders in each heat qualified to the second round, all other riders advanced to the first round repechages.

Heat 1

Rank	Name	Nation	Notes
1	Andriy Vynokurov	Ukraine	Q
2	Uladzislau Novik	Belarus	Q
3	Svajūnas Jonauskas	Lithuania	
4	Francesco Ceci	Italy	
5	Ayrton De Pauw	Belgium	
REL	Alexander Dubchenko	Russia	

Heat 2

Rank	Name	Nation	Notes
1	Sébastien Vigier	France	Q
2	Joseph Truman	Great Britain	Q
3	Joachim Eilers	Germany	
4	Norbert Szabo	Romania	
REL	Sam Ligtlee	Netherlands	
DNF	Sergii Omelchenko	Azerbaijan	
DNF	Sándor Szalontay	Hungary	

Heat 3

Rank	Name	Nation	Notes
1	Stefan Bötticher	Germany	Q
2	Jack Carlin	Great Britain	Q
3	Mateusz Lipa	Poland	
4	Juan Peralta	Spain	
5	Quentin Lafargue	France	
6	Tomáš Bábek	Czech Republic	
7	Artsiom Zaitsau	Belarus	

Heat 4

Rank	Name	Nation	Notes
1	Denis Dmitriev	Russia	Q
2	Harrie Lavreysen	Netherlands	Q
3	Krzysztof Maksel	Poland	
4	Jose Moreno	Spain	
5	Pavel Kelemen	Czech Republic	
6	David Askurava	Georgia	
7	Luca Ceci	Italy	

=== First round repechage ===
The first rider in each heat qualified to the second round.

Heat 1

Rank	Name	Nation	Notes
1	Quentin Lafargue	France	Q
2	Svajūnas Jonauskas	Lithuania	
3	Jose Moreno	Spain	
4	Sergii Omelchenko	Azerbaijan	

Heat 2

Rank	Name	Nation	Notes
1	Joachim Eilers	Germany	Q
2	Juan Peralta	Spain	
3	Alexander Dubchenko	Russia	
4	Luca Ceci	Italy	
5	Sam Ligtlee	Netherlands	

Heat 3

Rank	Name	Nation	Notes
1	Mateusz Lipa	Poland	Q
2	Artsiom Zaitsau	Belarus	
3	Ayrton De Pauw	Belgium	
4	Norbert Szabo	Romania	
5	David Askurava	Georgia	

Heat 4

Rank	Name	Nation	Notes
1	Krzysztof Maksel	Poland	Q
2	Pavel Kelemen	Czech Republic	
3	Tomáš Bábek	Czech Republic	
4	Sándor Szalontay	Hungary	
5	Francesco Ceci	Italy	

=== Second round ===
The first three riders in each heat qualified to final 1–6, all other riders advanced to final 7–12.

Heat 1

Rank	Name	Nation	Notes
1	Quentin Lafargue	France	Q
2	Jack Carlin	Great Britain	Q
3	Krzysztof Maksel	Poland	Q
4	Andriy Vynokurov	Ukraine	
5	Denis Dmitriev	Russia	
6	Joseph Truman	Great Britain	

Heat 2

Rank	Name	Nation	Notes
1	Sébastien Vigier	France	Q
2	Stefan Bötticher	Germany	Q
3	Harrie Lavreysen	Netherlands	Q
4	Joachim Eilers	Germany	
5	Uladzislau Novik	Belarus	
6	Mateusz Lipa	Poland	

=== Finals ===
Small final

Rank	Name	Nation	Notes
7	Joachim Eilers	Germany	
8	Andriy Vynokurov	Ukraine	
9	Joseph Truman	Great Britain	
10	Mateusz Lipa	Poland	
11	Denis Dmitriev	Russia	
12	Uladzislau Novik	Belarus	

Final

Rank	Name	Nation	Notes
1st place, gold medalist(s)	Stefan Bötticher	Germany	
2nd place, silver medalist(s)	Sébastien Vigier	France	
3rd place, bronze medalist(s)	Jack Carlin	Great Britain	
4	Quentin Lafargue	France	
5	Harrie Lavreysen	Netherlands	
6	Krzysztof Maksel	Poland	
