= 2016 UEC European Track Championships – Men's keirin =

Men's keirin at the 2016 UEC European Track Championships
- UEC European Champion jersey
- Venue: Vélodrome de Saint-Quentin-en-Yvelines, Yvelines
- Date: 23 October
- Competitors: 32 from 19 nations

Medalists
gold medal	Tomáš Bábek	Czech Republic
silver medal	Andriy Vynokurov	Ukraine
bronze medal	Charly Conord	France

The Men's keirin was held on 23 October 2016.

== Results ==
=== First round ===
Heat winners qualified directly for the semi-finals; the remainder went to the first round repechage.

==== Heat 1 ====
Rank	Name	Nation	Notes
1	Sergii Omelchenko	Azerbaijan	Q
2	Vasilijus Lendelis	Lithuania	
3	Charly Conord	France	
4	Roy van den Berg	Netherlands	
5	Yauhen Veramchuk	Belarus	

==== Heat 3 ====
Rank	Name	Nation	Notes
1	Joseph Truman	Great Britain	Q
2	Sergio Aliaga	Spain	
3	Miroslav Minchev	Bulgaria	
4	Francesco Ceci	Italy	
5	Alexander Dubchenko	Russia	

==== Heat 5 ====
Rank	Name	Nation	Notes
1	Patryk Rajkowski	Poland	Q
2	Sandor Szalontay	Hungary	
3	Uladzislau Novik	Belarus	
4	Robin Wagner	Czech Republic	
5	Ayrton De Pauw	Belgium	
–	Mateusz Lipa	Poland	DSQ

==== Heat 2 ====
Rank	Name	Nation	Notes
1	Andriy Vynokurov	Ukraine	Q
2	Juan Peralta	Spain	
3	Sotirios Bretas	Greece	
4	Benjamin Edelin	France	
5	Davide Ceci	Italy	

==== Heat 4 ====
Rank	Name	Nation	Notes
1	Tomáš Bábek	Czech Republic	Q
2	Jack Carlin	Great Britain	
3	Nikita Shurshin	Russia	
4	Eoin Mullen	Ireland	
5	Davit Askurava	Georgia	

==== Heat 6 ====
Rank	Name	Nation	Notes
1	Marc Jurczyk	Germany	Q
2	Tobias Wächter	Germany	
3	Zafeiris Volikakis	Greece	
4	Svajunas Jonauskas	Lithuania	
5	Robin Venneman	Belgium	
6	Carlo Cesar	Netherlands	

=== First round Repechage ===
Heat winners qualified for the semi-finals.

==== Heat 1 ====
Rank	Name	Nation	Notes
1	Zafeiris Volikakis	Greece	Q
2	Benjamin Edelin	France	
3	Vasilijus Lendelis	Lithuania	
4	Ayrton De Pauw	Belgium	

==== Heat 3 ====
Rank	Name	Nation	Notes
1	Robin Wagner	Czech Republic	Q
2	Nikita Shurshin	Russia	
3	Davide Ceci	Italy	
4	Sergio Aliaga	Spain	

==== Heat 5 ====
Rank	Name	Nation	Notes
1	Sotirios Bertas	Greece	Q
2	Francesco Ceci	Italy	
3	Carlo Cesar	Netherlands	
4	Sandor Szalontay	Hungary	
5	Davit Askurava	Georgia	

==== Heat 2 ====
Rank	Name	Nation	Notes
1	Juan Peralta	Spain	Q
2	Uladzislau Novik	Belarus	
3	Robin Venneman	Belgium	
4	Roy van den Berg	Netherlands	

==== Heat 4 ====
Rank	Name	Nation	Notes
1	Jack Carlin	Great Britain	Q
2	Svajunas Jonauskas	Lithuania	
3	Yauhen Veramchuk	Belarus	
4	Miroslav Minchev	Bulgaria	

==== Heat 6 ====
Rank	Name	Nation	Notes
1	Charly Conord	France	Q
2	Alexander Dubchenko	Russia	
3	Tobias Wächter	Germany	
4	Eoin Mullen	Ireland	

=== Semi-finals ===
First three riders in each semi qualified for the final; the remainder went to the small final (for places 7-12).

==== Semi-final 1 ====
Rank	Name	Nation	Notes
1	Tomáš Bábek	Czech Republic	Q
2	Patryk Rajkowski	Poland	Q
3	Charly Conord	France	Q
4	Sergii Omelchenko	Azerbaijan	
5	Robin Wagner	Czech Republic	
6	Juan Peralta	Spain	

==== Semi-final 2 ====
Rank	Name	Nation	Notes
1	Andriy Vynokurov	Ukraine	Q
2	Joseph Truman	Great Britain	Q
3	Marc Jurczyk	Germany	Q
4	Sotirios Bertas	Greece	
5	Jack Carlin	Great Britain	
6	Zafeiris Volikakis	Greece	

=== Finals ===
The final classification is determined in the ranking finals.

==== Final (places 7-12) ====
Rank	Name	Nation	Notes
7	Jack Carlin	Great Britain	
8	Robin Wagner	Czech Republic	
9	Sergii Omelchenko	Azerbaijan	
10	Juan Peralta	Spain	
11	Zafeiris Volikakis	Greece	
12	Sotirios Bertas	Greece	

==== Final (places 1-6) ====
Rank	Name	Nation	Notes
1st place, gold medalist(s)	Tomáš Bábek	Czech Republic	
2nd place, silver medalist(s)	Andriy Vynokurov	Ukraine	
3rd place, bronze medalist(s)	Charly Conord	France	
4	Marc Jurczyk	Germany	
5	Patryk Rajkowski	Poland	
6	Joseph Truman	Great Britain	
