= 2018 UEC European Track Championships – Men's sprint =

Men's sprint at the 2018 UEC European Track Championships
- Venue: Sir Chris Hoy Velodrome, Glasgow
- Date: 5–6 August
- Competitors: 29 from 17 nations

Medalists
gold medal	Jeffrey Hoogland	Netherlands
silver medal	Stefan Bötticher	Germany
bronze medal	Harrie Lavreysen	Netherlands

The men's sprint competition at the 2018 UEC European Track Championships was held on 5 and 6 August 2018.

== Results ==
=== Qualifying ===
The top four riders advanced directly to the 1/8 finals; places 5 to 28 advanced to the 1/16 finals.

Rank	Name	Nation	Time	Behind	Notes
1	Stefan Bötticher	Germany	9.722		Q
2	Jeffrey Hoogland	Netherlands	9.727	+0.005	Q
3	Harrie Lavreysen	Netherlands	9.770	+0.048	Q
4	Sebastien Vigier	France	9.783	+0.061	Q
5	Jack Carlin	Great Britain	9.789	+0.067	q
6	Denis Dmitriev	Russia	9.863	+0.141	q
7	Philip Hindes	Great Britain	9.875	+0.153	q
8	Pavel Yakushevskiy	Russia	9.880	+0.158	q
9	Vasilijus Lendel	Lithuania	9.905	+0.183	q
10	Grégory Baugé	France	9.909	+0.187	q
11	Pavel Kelemen	Czech Republic	9.979	+0.257	q
12	Andriy Vynokurov	Ukraine	9.982	+0.260	q
13	Maximilian Dörnbach	Germany	10.004	+0.282	q
14	Mateusz Lipa	Poland	10.014	+0.292	q
15	Martin Čechman	Czech Republic	10.019	+0.297	q
16	Sandor Szalontay	Hungary	10.037	+0.315	q
17	Jose Moreno	Spain	10.131	+0.409	q
18	Rafał Sarnecki	Poland	10.147	+0.425	q
19	Juan Peralta	Spain	10.148	+0.426	q
20	Ayrton De Pauw	Belgium	10.272	+0.550	q
21	Svajūnas Jonauskas	Lithuania	10.378	+0.656	q
22	Luca Ceci	Italy	10.418	+0.696	q
23	Davide Ceci	Italy	10.432	+0.710	q
24	Artsiom Zaitsau	Belarus	10.489	+0.767	q
25	Norbert Szabo	Romania	10.624	+0.902	q
26	Yauhen Veramchuk	Belarus	10.678	+0.956	q
27	Maksym Lopatiuk	Georgia	10.772	+1.050	q
28	Sergii Omelchenko	Azerbaijan	10.886	+1.164	q
29	David Askurava	Georgia	11.082	+1.360	

=== 1/16 finals ===
Heat winners advanced to the 1/8 finals.

Heat	Rank	Name	Nation	Time	Notes
1	1	Jack Carlin	Great Britain	10.605	Q
1	2	Sergii Omelchenko	Azerbaijan		
2	1	Denis Dmitriev	Russia	11.315	Q
2	2	Maksym Lopatiuk	Georgia		
3	1	Philip Hindes	Great Britain	10.610	Q
3	2	Yauhen Veramchuk	Belarus		
4	1	Pavel Yakushevskiy	Russia	10.870	Q
4	2	Norbert Szabo	Romania		
5	1	Vasilijus Lendel	Lithuania	10.549	Q
5	2	Artsiom Zaitsau	Belarus		
6	1	Grégory Baugé	France	10.696	Q
6	2	Davide Ceci	Italy		
7	1	Pavel Kelemen	Czech Republic	10.752	Q
7	2	Luca Ceci	Italy		
8	1	Andriy Vynokurov	Ukraine	10.364	Q
8	2	Svajūnas Jonauskas	Lithuania		
9	1	Maximilian Dörnbach	Germany	10.347	Q
9	2	Ayrton De Pauw	Belgium		
10	1	Mateusz Lipa	Poland	10.327	Q
10	2	Juan Peralta	Spain		
11	1	Rafał Sarnecki	Poland	10.294	Q
11	2	Martin Čechman	Czech Republic		
12	1	Sandor Szalontay	Hungary	10.641	Q
12	2	Jose Moreno	Spain		

=== 1/8 finals ===
Heat winners advanced to the quarterfinals.

Heat	Rank	Name	Nation	Time	Notes
1	1	Stefan Bötticher	Germany	10.855	Q
1	2	Sandor Szalontay	Hungary		
2	1	Jeffrey Hoogland	Netherlands	9.907	Q
2	2	Rafał Sarnecki	Poland		
3	1	Harrie Lavreysen	Netherlands	10.102	Q
3	2	Mateusz Lipa	Poland		
4	1	Sebastien Vigier	France	10.357	Q
4	2	Maximilian Dörnbach	Germany		
5	1	Jack Carlin	Great Britain	10.184	Q
5	2	Andriy Vynokurov	Ukraine		
6	1	Denis Dmitriev	Russia	10.379	Q
6	2	Pavel Kelemen	Czech Republic		
7	1	Philip Hindes	Great Britain	10.299	Q
7	2	Grégory Baugé	France		
8	1	Vasilijus Lendel	Lithuania	10.639	Q
8	2	Pavel Yakushevskiy	Russia		

=== Quarterfinals ===
Matches are extended to a best-of-three format hereon; winners proceed to the semifinals.

Heat	Rank	Name	Nation	Race 1	Race 2	Decider (i.r.)	Notes
1	1	Stefan Bötticher	Germany	10.209	10.236		Q
1	2	Vasilijus Lendel	Lithuania				
2	1	Jeffrey Hoogland	Netherlands	10.104	10.075		Q
2	2	Philip Hindes	Great Britain				
3	1	Harrie Lavreysen	Netherlands	10.146	10.467		Q
3	2	Denis Dmitriev	Russia				
4	1	Jack Carlin	Great Britain	10.398	10.298		Q
4	2	Sebastien Vigier	France				

=== Semifinals ===
Winners proceed to the gold medal final; losers proceed to the bronze medal final.

Heat	Rank	Name	Nation	Race 1	Race 2	Decider (i.r.)	Notes
1	1	Stefan Bötticher	Germany	10.346	REL	10.173	QG
1	2	Jack Carlin	Great Britain	REL	10.523		QB
2	1	Jeffrey Hoogland	Netherlands		10.331	9.902	QG
2	2	Harrie Lavreysen	Netherlands	10.067			QB

=== Finals ===
Rank	Name	Nation	Race 1	Race 2	Decider (i.r.)
Gold medal final
1st place, gold medalist(s)	Jeffrey Hoogland	Netherlands	9.952	10.113	
2nd place, silver medalist(s)	Stefan Bötticher	Germany			
Bronze medal final
3rd place, bronze medalist(s)	Harrie Lavreysen	Netherlands	10.424		10.081
4	Jack Carlin	Great Britain		10.271	
