= 2017 UEC European Track Championships – Men's keirin =

Men's keirin at the 2017 UEC European Track Championships
- UEC European Champion jersey
- Venue: Velodrom, Berlin
- Date: 22 October
- Competitors: 31 from 19 nations

Medalists
gold medal	Maximilian Levy	Germany
silver medal	Shane Perkins	Russia
bronze medal	Andrii Vynokurov	Ukraine

The Men's keirin was held on 22 October 2017.

== Results ==
=== First round ===
Heat winners qualified directly for the semi-finals; the remainder went to the first round repechage.

==== Heat 1 ====
Rank	Name	Nation	Notes
1	Tomáš Bábek	Czech Republic	Q
2	Harrie Lavreysen	Netherlands	
3	Krzysztof Maksel	Poland	
4	Luca Ceci	Italy	
DNF	Sotirios Bretas	Greece	

==== Heat 3 ====
Rank	Name	Nation	Notes
1	Joachim Eilers	Germany	Q
2	Ayrton De Pauw	Belgium	
3	Uladzislau Novik	Belarus	
4	Vasilijus Lendel	Lithuania	
5	Eoin Mullen	Ireland	

==== Heat 5 ====
Rank	Name	Nation	Notes
1	Shane Perkins	Russia	Q
2	Volodymyr Buchynyskyy	Ukraine	
3	Sergii Omelchenko	Azerbaijan	
4	Mateusz Lipa	Poland	
5	Sándor Szalontay	Hungary	

==== Heat 2 ====
Rank	Name	Nation	Notes
1	Sébastien Vigier	France	Q
2	Jack Carlin	Great Britain	
3	Andriy Vynokurov	Ukraine	
4	Denis Dmitriev	Russia	
5	Francesco Ceci	Italy	

==== Heat 4 ====
Rank	Name	Nation	Notes
1	Matthijs Büchli	Netherlands	Q
2	Joseph Truman	Great Britain	
3	José Moreno	Spain	
4	Quentin Lafargue	France	
5	Artsiom Zaitsau	Belarus	

==== Heat 6 ====
Rank	Name	Nation	Notes
1	Maximilian Levy	Germany	Q
2	Pavel Kelemen	Czech Republic	
3	Svajūnas Jonauskas	Lithuania	
4	Juan Peralta	Spain	
5	David Askurava	Georgia	
6	Norbert Szabó	Romania	

=== First round Repechage ===
Heat winners qualified for the semi-finals.

==== Heat 1 ====
Rank	Name	Nation	Notes
1	Harrie Lavreysen	Netherlands	Q
2	Svajūnas Jonauskas	Lithuania	
3	Mateusz Lipa	Poland	
4	Artsiom Zaitsau	Belarus	

==== Heat 3 ====
Rank	Name	Nation	Notes
1	Andriy Vynokurov	Ukraine	Q
2	Luca Ceci	Italy	
3	David Askurava	Georgia	
4	Ayrton De Pauw	Belgium	

==== Heat 5 ====
Rank	Name	Nation	Notes
1	Vasilijus Lendel	Lithuania	Q
2	José Moreno	Spain	
3	Volodymyr Buchynyskyy	Ukraine	
4	Francesco Ceci	Italy	

==== Heat 2 ====
Rank	Name	Nation	Notes
1	Jack Carlin	Great Britain	Q
2	Krzysztof Maksel	Poland	
3	Juan Peralta	Spain	
4	Sándor Szalontay	Hungary	

==== Heat 4 ====
Rank	Name	Nation	Notes
1	Denis Dmitriev	Russia	Q
2	Uladzislau Novik	Belarus	
3	Sotirios Bretas	Greece	
4	Joseph Truman	Great Britain	
5	Norbert Szabó	Romania	

==== Heat 6 ====
Rank	Name	Nation	Notes
1	Pavel Kelemen	Czech Republic	Q
2	Sergii Omelchenko	Azerbaijan	
3	Quentin Lafargue	France	
4	Eoin Mullen	Ireland	

=== Semi-finals ===
First three riders in each semi qualified for the final; the remainder went to the small final (for places 7-12).

==== Semi-final 1 ====
Rank	Name	Nation	Notes
1	Tomáš Bábek	Czech Republic	Q
2	Andriy Vynokurov	Ukraine	Q
3	Shane Perkins	Russia	Q
4	Harrie Lavreysen	Netherlands	
5	Joachim Eilers	Germany	
6	Vasilijus Lendel	Lithuania	

==== Semi-final 2 ====
Rank	Name	Nation	Notes
1	Sébastien Vigier	France	Q
2	Denis Dmitriev	Russia	Q
3	Maximilian Levy	Germany	Q
4	Pavel Kelemen	Czech Republic	
5	Matthijs Büchli	Netherlands	
6	Jack Carlin	Great Britain	

=== Finals ===
The final classification is determined in the ranking finals.

==== Final (places 7-12) ====
Rank	Name	Nation	Notes
7	Harrie Lavreysen	Netherlands	
8	Joachim Eilers	Germany	
9	Matthijs Büchli	Netherlands	
10	Pavel Kelemen	Czech Republic	
11	Jack Carlin	Great Britain	
12	Vasilijus Lendel	Lithuania	

==== Final (places 1-6) ====
Rank	Name	Nation	Notes
1st place, gold medalist(s)	Maximilian Levy	Germany	
2nd place, silver medalist(s)	Shane Perkins	Russia	
3rd place, bronze medalist(s)	Andriy Vynokurov	Ukraine	
4	Tomáš Bábek	Czech Republic	
5	Denis Dmitriev	Russia	
6	Sébastien Vigier	France	
