= 2015 UEC European Track Championships – Men's team sprint =

Men's team sprint at the 2015 UEC European Track Championships
- UEC European Champion jersey
- Venue: Velodrome Suisse, Grenchen
- Date: 15 October
- Competitors: 31 from 10 nations

Medalists
gold medal	Nils van 't Hoenderdaal; Jeffrey Hoogland; Hugo Haak	Netherlands
silver medal	Grzegorz Drejgier; Rafał Sarnecki; Krzysztof Maksel	Poland
bronze medal	Robert Förstemann; Max Niederlag; Joachim Eilers; Maximilian Levy	Germany

The Men's team sprint was held on 15 October 2015.

== Results ==
=== Qualifying ===
The fastest 4 teams qualify for the medal finals.

Rank	Name	Nation	Time	Notes
1	Grzegorz Drejgier; Rafał Sarnecki; Krzysztof Maksel	Poland	43.127	QG
2	Nils van 't Hoenderdaal; Jeffrey Hoogland; Hugo Haak	Netherlands	43.224	QG
3	Robert Förstemann; Max Niederlag; Maximilian Levy	Germany	43.537	QB
4	Kévin Sireau; Quentin Lafargue; Michaël D'Almeida	France	43.934	QB
5	Philip Hindes; Jason Kenny; Lewis Oliva	Great Britain	44.024	
6	Pavel Yakushevskiy; Kirill Samusenko; Alexey Tkachev	Russia	44.247	
7	Yauhen Veramchuk; Artsiom Zaitsau; Uladzislau Novik	Belarus	44.495	
8	José Moreno Sánchez; Juan Peralta; Sergio Aliaga	Spain	44.716	
9	Volodymyr Buchynskyy; Andriy Vynokurov; Andriy Kutsenko	Ukraine	45.435	
10	Stanislav Krastev; Radoslav Konstantinov; Miroslav Minchev	Bulgaria	49.692	

- QG = qualified for gold medal final
- QB = qualified for bronze medal final

=== Finals ===
The final classification is determined in the medal finals.

Rank	Name	Nation	Time	Notes
Bronze medal final
3rd place, bronze medalist(s)	Robert Förstemann; Max Niederlag; Joachim Eilers	Germany	43.210	
4	Kévin Sireau; Quentin Lafargue; Michaël D'Almeida	France	43.794	
Gold medal final
1st place, gold medalist(s)	Nils van 't Hoenderdaal; Jeffrey Hoogland; Hugo Haak	Netherlands	43.232	
2nd place, silver medalist(s)	Grzegorz Drejgier; Rafał Sarnecki; Krzysztof Maksel	Poland	43.358	
