= 2016 UEC European Track Championships – Men's team sprint =

Men's team sprint at the 2016 UEC European Track Championships
- UEC European Champion jersey
- Venue: Vélodrome de Saint-Quentin-en-Yvelines, Yvelines
- Date: 20 October
- Competitors: 37 from 12 nations

Medalists
gold medal	Maciej Bielecki; Kamil Kuczyński; Mateusz Rudyk; Mateusz Lipa	Poland
silver medal	Jack Carlin; Ryan Owens; Joseph Truman	Great Britain
bronze medal	Eric Engler; Robert Förstemann; Jan May	Germany

The Men's team sprint was held on 20 October 2016.

== Results ==
=== Qualifying ===
The fastest 8 teams qualify for the first round.

Rank	Name	Nation	Time	Notes
1	Eric Engler; Robert Förstemann; Jan May	Germany	43.434	Q
2	Jack Carlin; Ryan Owens; Joseph Truman	Great Britain	43.494	Q
3	Quentin Lafargue; Kévin Sireau; Sebastien Vigier	France	43.670	Q
4	Maciej Bielecki; Mateusz Lipa; Mateusz Rudyk	Poland	43.751	Q
5	Kirill Samusenko; Alexey Tkachev; Pavel Yakushevskiy	Russia	44.105	Q
6	Uladzislau Novik; Yauhen Veramchuk; Artsiom Zaitsau	Belarus	44.662	Q
7	Tomáš Bábek; Jiri Janosek; Robin Wagner	Czech Republic	44.666	Q
8	Sergio Aliaga; José Moreno Sánchez; Juan Peralta	Spain	45.154	Q
9	Carlo Cesar; Harrie Lavreysen; Roy van den Berg	Netherlands	45.783	
10	Ayrton De Pauw; Gerald Nys; Robin Venneman	Belgium	46.068	
11	Davide Ceci; Francesco Ceci; Luca Ceci	Italy	46.211	
12	Nikolay Genov; Miroslav Minchev; Nikolay Stanchev	Bulgaria	51.830	

- Q = qualified

=== First round ===
First round heats are held as follows:
Heat 1: 4th v 5th qualifier
Heat 2: 3rd v 6th qualifier
Heat 3: 2nd v 7th qualifier
Heat 4: 1st v 8th qualifier

The heat winners are ranked on time, from which the top 2 proceed to the gold medal final and the other 2 proceed to the bronze medal final.

Rank	Heat	Name	Nation	Time	Notes
1	3	Jack Carlin; Ryan Owens; Joseph Truman	Great Britain	43.311	QG
2	1	Maciej Bielecki; Kamil Kuczyński; Mateusz Rudyk	Poland	43.358	QG
3	4	Eric Engler; Robert Förstemann; Jan May	Germany	43.503	QB
4	2	Quentin Lafargue; Kévin Sireau; Sebastien Vigier	France	43.550	QB
5	1	Kirill Samusenko; Alexey Tkachev; Pavel Yakushevskiy	Russia	43.949	
6	2	Uladzislau Novik; Yauhen Veramchuk; Artsiom Zaitsau	Belarus	44.291	
7	3	Tomáš Bábek; Jiri Janosek; Robin Wagner	Czech Republic	44.404	
8	4	Sergio Aliaga; José Moreno Sánchez; Juan Peralta	Spain	45.160	

- QG = qualified for gold medal final
- QB = qualified for bronze medal final

=== Finals ===
The final classification is determined in the medal finals.

Rank	Name	Nation	Time	Notes
Bronze medal final
3rd place, bronze medalist(s)	Eric Engler; Robert Förstemann; Jan May	Germany	43.083	
4	Quentin Lafargue; Kévin Sireau; Sebastien Vigier	France	43.546	
Gold medal final
1st place, gold medalist(s)	Maciej Bielecki; Kamil Kuczyński; Mateusz Rudyk	Poland	43.211	
2nd place, silver medalist(s)	Jack Carlin; Ryan Owens; Joseph Truman	Great Britain	43.398	
