= 2020 UEC European Track Championships – Men's keirin =

Men's keirin at the 2020 UEC European Track Championships
- Venue: Kolodruma, Plovdiv
- Date: 14 November
- Competitors: 16 from 10 nations

Medalists
gold medal	Maximilian Levy	Germany
silver medal	Denis Dmitriev	Russia
bronze medal	Sotirios Bretas	Greece

The men's keirin competition at the 2020 UEC European Track Championships was held on 14 November 2020.

== Results ==
=== First round ===
The first two riders in each heat qualified to the semifinals, all other riders advanced to the first round repechages.

Heat 1

Rank	Name	Nation	Notes
1	Maximilian Levy	Germany	Q
2	Dmytro Stovbetskyi	Ukraine	Q
3	Patrik Rómeó Lovassy	Hungary	
4	Vasilijus Lendel	Lithuania	
5	Alejandro Martínez	Spain	

Heat 2

Rank	Name	Nation	Notes
1	Tomáš Bábek	Czech Republic	Q
2	Svajūnas Jonauskas	Lithuania	Q
3	Alexander Sharapov	Russia	
4	Konstantinos Livanos	Greece	
5	Juan Peralta	Spain	

Heat 3

Rank	Name	Nation	Notes
1	Denis Dmitriev	Russia	Q
2	Sotirios Bretas	Greece	Q
3	Bohdan Danylchuk	Ukraine	
4	Martin Čechman	Czech Republic	
5	Artsiom Zaitsau	Belarus	
6	Miroslav Minchev	Bulgaria	

=== First round repechage ===
The first three riders in each heat qualified to the semifinals.

Heat 1

Rank	Name	Nation	Notes
1	Martin Čechman	Czech Republic	Q
2	Miroslav Minchev	Bulgaria	Q
3	Juan Peralta	Spain	Q
4	Konstantinos Livanos	Greece	
5	Patrik Rómeó Lovassy	Hungary	

Heat 2

Rank	Name	Nation	Notes
1	Alexander Sharapov	Russia	Q
2	Alejandro Martínez	Spain	Q
3	Artsiom Zaitsau	Belarus	Q
4	Vasilijus Lendel	Lithuania	
5	Bohdan Danylchuk	Ukraine	

=== Semifinals ===
The first three riders in each heat qualified to final 1–6, all other riders advanced to final 7–12.

Heat 1

Rank	Name	Nation	Notes
1	Maximilian Levy	Germany	Q
2	Alexander Sharapov	Russia	Q
3	Sotirios Bretas	Greece	Q
4	Svajūnas Jonauskas	Lithuania	
5	Miroslav Minchev	Bulgaria	
6	Artsiom Zaitsau	Belarus	

Heat 2

Rank	Name	Nation	Notes
1	Denis Dmitriev	Russia	Q
2	Juan Peralta	Spain	Q
3	Alejandro Martínez	Spain	Q
4	Tomáš Bábek	Czech Republic	
5	Dmytro Stovbetskyi	Ukraine	
6	Martin Čechman	Czech Republic	

=== Finals ===
Small final

Rank	Name	Nation	Notes
7	Tomáš Bábek	Czech Republic	
8	Artsiom Zaitsau	Belarus	
9	Svajūnas Jonauskas	Lithuania	
10	Martin Čechman	Czech Republic	
11	Dmytro Stovbetskyi	Ukraine	
12	Miroslav Minchev	Bulgaria	

Final

Rank	Name	Nation	Notes
1st place, gold medalist(s)	Maximilian Levy	Germany	
2nd place, silver medalist(s)	Denis Dmitriev	Russia	
3rd place, bronze medalist(s)	Sotirios Bretas	Greece	
4	Juan Peralta	Spain	
5	Alejandro Martínez	Spain	
6	Alexander Sharapov	Russia	
