= 2019 UEC European Track Championships – Men's 1 km time trial =

Men's 1 km time trial at the 2019 UEC European Track Championships
- Venue: Omnisport Apeldoorn, Apeldoorn
- Date: 20 October
- Competitors: 20 from 12 nations
- Winning time: 1:00.289

Medalists
gold medal	Quentin Lafargue	France
silver medal	Theo Bos	Netherlands
bronze medal	Michaël D'Almeida	France

The men's 1 km time trial competition at the 2019 UEC European Track Championships was held on 20 October 2019.

== Results ==
=== Qualifying ===
The top 8 riders qualified for the final.

Rank	Name	Nation	Time	Behind	Notes
1	Quentin Lafargue	France	1:00.045		Q
2	Sam Ligtlee	Netherlands	1:00.196	+0.151	Q
3	Theo Bos	Netherlands	1:00.226	+0.181	Q
4	Marc Jurczyk	Germany	1:00.620	+0.575	Q
5	Krzysztof Maksel	Poland	1:00.637	+0.592	Q
6	Tomáš Bábek	Czech Republic	1:00.691	+0.646	Q
7	Michaël D'Almeida	France	1:00.846	+0.801	Q
8	Pavel Yakushevskiy	Russia	1:00.946	+0.901	Q
9	Francesco Lamon	Italy	1:00.966	+0.921	
10	Maximilian Dörnbach	Germany	1:01.227	+1.182	
11	Francesco Ceci	Italy	1:01.392	+1.347	
12	Robin Wagner	Czech Republic	1:01.615	+1.570	
13	José Moreno Sánchez	Spain	1:02.126	+2.081	
14	Sasha Weemaes	Belgium	1:02.166	+2.121	
15	Sándor Szalontay	Hungary	1:02.240	+2.195	
16	Rafał Sarnecki	Poland	1:02.478	+2.433	
17	Alexander Sharapov	Russia	1:02.636	+2.591	
18	Uladzislau Novik	Belarus	1:03.042	+2.997	
19	Ekain Jiménez	Spain	1:03.400	+3.355	
20	Oleksander Kryvych	Ukraine	1:04.529	+4.484	

=== Final ===
Rank	Name	Nation	Time	Behind	Notes
1st place, gold medalist(s)	Quentin Lafargue	France	1:00.289		
2nd place, silver medalist(s)	Theo Bos	Netherlands	1:00.409	+0.120	
3rd place, bronze medalist(s)	Michaël D'Almeida	France	1:00.663	+0.374	
4	Sam Ligtlee	Netherlands	1:00.701	+0.412	
5	Marc Jurczyk	Germany	1:00.733	+0.444	
6	Tomáš Bábek	Czech Republic	1:00.745	+0.456	
7	Krzysztof Maksel	Poland	1:00.755	+0.466	
8	Pavel Yakushevskiy	Russia	1:01.759	+1.470	
