= 2020 UEC European Track Championships – Men's sprint =

Men's sprint at the 2020 UEC European Track Championships
- Venue: Kolodruma, Plovdiv
- Date: 12–13 November
- Competitors: 20 from 12 nations

Medalists
gold medal	Maximilian Levy	Germany
silver medal	Denis Dmitriev	Russia
bronze medal	Vasilijus Lendel	Lithuania

The men's sprint competition at the 2020 UEC European Track Championships was held on 12 and 13 November 2020.

== Results ==
=== Qualifying ===
The top 12 riders qualified for the 1/8 finals, the others proceed to the 1/16 finals.

Rank	Name	Nation	Time	Behind	Notes
1	Denis Dmitriev	Russia	9.642		Q
2	Maximilian Levy	Germany	9.672	+0.030	Q
3	Vasilijus Lendel	Lithuania	9.822	+0.179	Q
4	Sotirios Bretas	Greece	9.830	+0.188	Q
5	Juan Peralta	Spain	9.869	+0.226	Q
6	Martin Čechman	Czech Republic	9.873	+0.231	Q
7	Jakub Šťastný	Czech Republic	9.886	+0.243	Q
8	Konstantinos Livanos	Greece	9.918	+0.276	Q
9	Norbert Szabo	Romania	9.936	+0.294	Q
10	Pavel Yakushevskiy	Russia	9.978	+0.335	Q
11	Svajūnas Jonauskas	Lithuania	10.000	+0.358	Q
12	Patrik Rómeó Lovassy	Hungary	10.088	+0.446	Q
13	Artsiom Zaitsau	Belarus	10.153	+0.511	q
14	Ekain Jiménez	Spain	10.177	+0.535	q
15	Dmytro Stovbetskyi	Ukraine	10.290	+0.648	q
16	Vladyslav Denysenko	Ukraine	10.392	+0.750	q
17	Miroslav Minchev	Bulgaria	10.404	+0.762	q
18	Bálint Csengői	Hungary	10.680	+1.038	q
19	Georgi Lumparov	Bulgaria	11.149	+1.507	q
20	Tilen Finkšt	Slovenia	11.267	+1.625	q

=== 1/16 finals ===
Heat winners advanced to the 1/8 finals.

Heat	Rank	Name	Nation	Time	Notes
1	1	Artsiom Zaitsau	Belarus		Q
1	2	Tilen Finkšt	Slovenia		
2	1	Ekain Jiménez	Spain	11.175	Q
2	2	Georgi Lumparov	Bulgaria		
3	1	Dmytro Stovbetskyi	Ukraine	10.579	Q
3	2	Bálint Csengői	Hungary		
4	1	Miroslav Minchev	Bulgaria	10.637	Q
4	2	Vladyslav Denysenko	Ukraine		

=== 1/8 finals ===
Heat winners advanced to the quarterfinals.

Heat	Rank	Name	Nation	Time	Notes
1	1	Denis Dmitriev	Russia	10.442	Q
1	2	Miroslav Minchev	Bulgaria		
2	1	Maximilian Levy	Germany	10.195	Q
2	2	Dmytro Stovbetskyi	Ukraine		
3	1	Vasilijus Lendel	Lithuania	11.614	Q
3	2	Ekain Jiménez	Spain		
4	1	Sotirios Bretas	Greece	10.477	Q
4	2	Artsiom Zaitsau	Belarus		
5	1	Juan Peralta	Spain	10.504	Q
5	2	Patrik Rómeó Lovassy	Hungary		
6	1	Martin Čechman	Czech Republic	10.501	Q
6	2	Svajūnas Jonauskas	Lithuania		
7	1	Jakub Šťastný	Czech Republic	10.339	Q
7	2	Pavel Yakushevskiy	Russia		
8	1	Norbert Szabo	Romania	10.333	Q
8	2	Konstantinos Livanos	Greece		

=== Quarterfinals ===
Matches are extended to a best-of-three format hereon; winners proceed to the semifinals.

Heat	Rank	Name	Nation	Race 1	Race 2	Decider (i.r.)	Notes
1	1	Denis Dmitriev	Russia	10.403	10.157		Q
1	2	Norbert Szabo	Romania				
2	1	Maximilian Levy	Germany	10.197	9.974		Q
2	2	Jakub Šťastný	Czech Republic				
3	1	Vasilijus Lendel	Lithuania	10.415	10.309		Q
3	2	Martin Čechman	Czech Republic				
4	1	Sotirios Bretas	Greece	10.177	10.233		Q
4	2	Juan Peralta	Spain				

=== Semifinals ===
Winners proceed to the gold medal final; losers proceed to the bronze medal final.

Heat	Rank	Name	Nation	Race 1	Race 2	Decider (i.r.)	Notes
1	1	Denis Dmitriev	Russia	10.090	10.372		QG
1	2	Sotirios Bretas	Greece				QB
2	1	Maximilian Levy	Germany	10.136	9.963		QG
2	2	Vasilijus Lendel	Lithuania				QB

=== Finals ===
Rank	Name	Nation	Race 1	Race 2	Decider (i.r.)
Gold medal final
1st place, gold medalist(s)	Maximilian Levy	Germany	10.055	9.969	
2nd place, silver medalist(s)	Denis Dmitriev	Russia			
Bronze medal final
3rd place, bronze medalist(s)	Vasilijus Lendel	Lithuania	10.083		10.048
4	Sotirios Bretas	Greece		10.142	
