= List of Bulgarian records in track cycling =

The following are the national records in track cycling in Bulgaria maintained by the Bulgarian Cycling Federation (Bulgarian: Българска Федерация по Колоездене).

== Men ==
Key to tables: Awaiting ratification Record not kept by Bulgarian Cycling Federation Not ratified or later rescinded by the Bulgarian Cycling Federation

Event	Record	Athlete	Date	Meet	Place	Ref
Flying 200 m time trial	10.311	Miroslav Minchev	7 October 2021	European Championships	Grenchen, Switzerland	
Flying 200 m time trial	10.266	Miroslav Minchev	26 October 2024	Balkan Open Track Championships	Plovdiv, Bulgaria	
Flying 200 m time trial	9.858	Pavel Nikolov	3 February 2026	European Championships	Konya, Turkey	
250 m time trial (standing start)	18.887	Miroslav Minchev	17 October 2015	European Championships	Grenchen, Switzerland	
Flying 500 m time trial (open air)	28.540	Nayden Naydenov (Junior 17-18)	1990	unknown	unknown	
Team sprint	47.799	Vasil Popov; Miroslav Minchev; Georgi Lumparov	27 October 2023	Open Balkan Cup	Plovdiv, Bulgaria	
Team sprint	45.950	Miroslav Minchev; Georgi Lumparov; Pavel Nikolov	26 October 2024	Balkan Open Track Championships	Plovdiv, Bulgaria	
Team sprint	45.208	Georgi Georgiev; Pavel Nikolov; Miroslav Minchev	1 February 2026	European Championships	Konya, Turkey	
1 km time trial	1:02.471	Miroslav Minchev	14 October 2023	Bulgarian Championships	Plovdiv, Bulgaria	
1 km time trial	1:02.076	Miroslav Minchev	26 October 2024	Balkan Open Track Championships	Plovdiv, Bulgaria	
1 km time trial	1:01.245	Miroslav Minchev	2 February 2026	European Championships	Konya, Turkey	
1 km time trial (sea level)	1:02.076	Miroslav Minchev	26 October 2024	Balkan Open Track Championships	Plovdiv, Bulgaria	
4000m individual pursuit	4:34.910	Martin Popov	18 September 2021	Bulgarian Championships	Plovdiv, Bulgaria	
4000m individual pursuit	4:27.007	Emil Stoynev	26 October 2024	Balkan Open Track Championships	Plovdiv, Bulgaria	
4000m team pursuit	4:22.404	Martin Popov; Nikolay Genov; Yordan Petrov; Ventsislav Venkov	27 October 2023	Open Balkan Cup	Plovdiv, Bulgaria	
Hour record	48.488 km	Martin Popov	18 October 2024	Individual attempt	Plovdiv, Bulgaria	

== Women ==
Event	Record	Athlete	Date	Meet	Place	Ref
Flying 200 m time trial	11.625	Evgenia Radanova	2003			
Flying 500 m time trial	33.240	Evgenia Radanova	2004			
500 m time trial	37.300	Evgenia Radanova	2003			
Flying 1000 m time trial	1:15.000	Evgenia Radanova	2003			
Flying 1000 m time trial	1:07.92	Ivana Tonkova	26 October 2024	Balkan Open Track Championships	Plovdiv, Bulgaria	
1000 m time trial	1:18.180	Evgenia Radanova	2004			
2000m individual pursuit	2:39.319	Zweta Gjurowa	1990			
3000m individual pursuit	3:54.335	Ivana Tonkova	26 October 2024	Balkan Open Track Championships	Plovdiv, Bulgaria	
5000m individual pursuit	7:08.000	Evgenia Radanova	2003			
3000m team pursuit	4:14.090	Tsveta Gyurova; Zhana Stoyanov; Elena Pritropova	1990			
