= 2016 UEC European Track Championships – Men's 1 km time trial =

Men's 1km time trial at the 2016 UEC European Track Championships
- UEC European Champion jersey
- Venue: Vélodrome de Saint-Quentin-en-Yvelines, Yvelines
- Date: 19 October
- Competitors: 22 from 15 nations

Medalists
| gold medal | Quentin Lafargue | France |
| silver medal | Eric Engler | Germany |
| bronze medal | Tomáš Bábek | Czech Republic |

The men's 1 km time trial was held on 19 October 2016.

== Results ==
| Rank | Name | Nation | Time | Notes |
|---|---|---|---|---|
| 1st place, gold medalist(s) | Quentin Lafargue | France | 1:00.685 | |
| 2nd place, silver medalist(s) | Eric Engler | Germany | 1:00.807 | |
| 3rd place, bronze medalist(s) | Tomáš Bábek | Czech Republic | 1:00.966 | |
| 4 | Jiri Janosek | Czech Republic | 1:01.612 | |
| 5 | Joseph Truman | Great Britain | 1:01.669 | |
| 6 | Benjamin Edelin | France | 1:01.967 | |
| 7 | Marc Jurczyk | Germany | 1:01.985 | |
| 8 | José Moreno Sánchez | Spain | 1:02.072 | |
| 9 | Aleksandr Vasiukhno | Russia | 1:02.106 | |
| 10 | Alexander Dubchenko | Russia | 1:02.639 | |
| 11 | Ivo Oliveira | Portugal | 1:02.720 | |
| 12 | Uladzislau Novik | Belarus | 1:02.883 | |
| 13 | Ryan Owens | Great Britain | 1:02.895 | |
| 14 | Anargyros Sotirakopoulos | Greece | 1:03.039 | |
| 15 | Ayrton De Pauw | Belgium | 1:03.674 | |
| 16 | Sandor Szalontay | Hungary | 1:03.928 | |
| 17 | Francesco Ceci | Italy | 1:03.966 | |
| 18 | Luca Ceci | Italy | 1:05.407 | |
| 19 | Mika Simola | Finland | 1:05.421 | |
| 20 | Miroslav Minchev | Bulgaria | 1:05.626 | |
| 21 | Joao Matias | Portugal | 1:06.527 | |
| 22 | Davidi Askurava | Georgia | 1:07.853 | |
