= List of Hungarian records in track cycling =

The following are the national records in track cycling in Hungary maintained by the Hungarian Cycling Federation.

== Men ==
Event	Record	Athlete	Date	Meet	Place	Ref
Flying 200 m time trial	9.517	Sándor Szalontay	3 February 2026	European Championships	Konya, Turkey	
250 m time trial (standing start)	18.578	Sándor Szalontay	19 October 2016	European Championships	Saint-Quentin-en-Yvelines, France	
Team sprint	44.051	Bálint Csengői; Patrik Rómeó Lovassy; Sándor Szalontay	1 February 2026	European Championships	Konya, Turkey	
1 km time trial	1:01.383	Patrik Rómeó Lovassy	2 February 2026	European Championships	Konya, Turkey	
1 km time trial (sea level)	1:01.427	Sándor Szalontay	15 August 2022	European Championships	Munich, Germany	
4000m individual pursuit						
4000m team pursuit						

== Women ==
Event	Record	Athlete	Date	Meet	Place	Ref
Flying 200 m time trial						
500 m time trial						
3000m individual pursuit						
3000m team pursuit						
