= List of Greek records in track cycling =

The following are the national records in track cycling in Greece maintained by the Hellenic Cycling Federation (Greek: Ελληνικη Ομοσπονδια Ποδηλασιας or EOP).

== Men ==
Event	Record	Athlete	Date	Meet	Place	Ref
Flying 200 m time trial	9.512	Konstantinos Livanos	3 February 2026	European Championships	Konya, Turkey	
250 m time trial (standing start)	17.599	Ioannis Kalogeropoulos	5 December 2013	World Cup	Aguascalientes, Mexico	
Team sprint	43.827		5 December 2013	World Cup	Aguascalientes, Mexico	
1 km time trial	1:00.814	Christos Volikakis	7 December 2013	World Cup	Aguascalientes, Mexico	
1 km time trial (sea level)	1:03.039	Anargyros Sotirakopoulos	19 October 2016	European Championships	Saint-Quentin-en-Yvelines, France	
4000m individual pursuit						
4000m team pursuit						

== Women ==
Event	Record	Athlete	Date	Meet	Place	Ref
Flying 200 m time trial						
500 m time trial						
3000m individual pursuit						
3000m team pursuit						
