= 2026 UEC European Track Championships – Men's 1 km time trial =

Men's 1 km time trial at the 2026 UEC Track Elite European Championships
- Venue: Konya Velodrome, Konya
- Date: 2 February
- Competitors: 25
- Winning time: 57.541

Medalists
gold medal	Joseph Truman	Great Britain
silver medal	Étienne Oliviero	France
bronze medal	David Peterka	Czech Republic

The men's 1 km time trial competition at the 2026 UEC European Track Championships was held on 2 February 2026.

== Results ==
=== Qualifying ===
The top 8 riders qualified for the final.

Rank	Name	Nation	Time	Behind	Notes
1	Étienne Oliviero	France	57.811		Q
2	David Peterka	Czech Republic	57.919	+0.108	Q
3	Joseph Truman	Great Britain	57.996	+0.185	Q
4	Matteo Bianchi	Italy	58.490	+0.679	Q
5	Maximilian Dörnbach	Germany	58.682	+0.871	Q
6	Fabio Del Medico	Italy	59.235	+1.424	Q
7	Adam Rauschgold	Czech Republic	59.365	+1.554	Q
8	Artsiom Zaitsau	Individual Neutral Athletes	59.613	+1.802	Q
9	Igor Girilovich	Individual Neutral Athletes	59.928	+2.117	
10	Nikita Kalachnik	Individual Neutral Athletes	1:00.117	+2.306	
11	Aliaksandr Hlova	Individual Neutral Athletes	1:00.267	+2.456	
12	Tomasz Łamaszewski	Poland	1:00.380	+2.569	
13	Rafał Sarnecki	Poland	1:00.708	+2.897	
14	Loris Leneman	Netherlands	1:00.837	+3.026	
15	José Moreno	Spain	1:01.061	+3.250	
16	Renzo Raes	Belgium	1:01.188	+3.377	
17	Miroslav Minchev	Bulgaria	1:01.245	+3.434	
18	Patrik Rómeó Lovassy	Hungary	1:01.383	+3.572	
19	Pavel Nikolov	Bulgaria	1:01.511	+3.700	
20	Maximilian Fitzgerald	Ireland	1:01.804	+3.993	
21	Vladyslav Holiak	Ukraine	1:01.963	+4.152	
22	Miltiadis Charovas	Greece	1:02.238	+4.427	
23	Runar De Schrijver	Belgium	1:02.245	+4.434	
24	Eduard Žalar	Slovenia	1:03.355	+5.544	
25	Val Žalar	Slovenia	1:06.607	+8.796	

=== Final ===
Rank	Name	Nation	Time	Behind	Notes
1st place, gold medalist(s)	Joseph Truman	Great Britain	57.541		
2nd place, silver medalist(s)	Étienne Oliviero	France	58.078	+0.537	
3rd place, bronze medalist(s)	David Peterka	Czech Republic	58.355	+0.814	
4	Matteo Bianchi	Italy	58.860	+1.319	
5	Maximilian Dörnbach	Germany	59.223	+1.682	
6	Artsiom Zaitsau	Individual Neutral Athletes	59.927	+2.386	
7	Fabio Del Medico	Italy	59.984	+2.443	
8	Adam Rauschgold	Czech Republic	59.990	+2.449	
