= Grzegorz Drejgier =

Polish cyclist

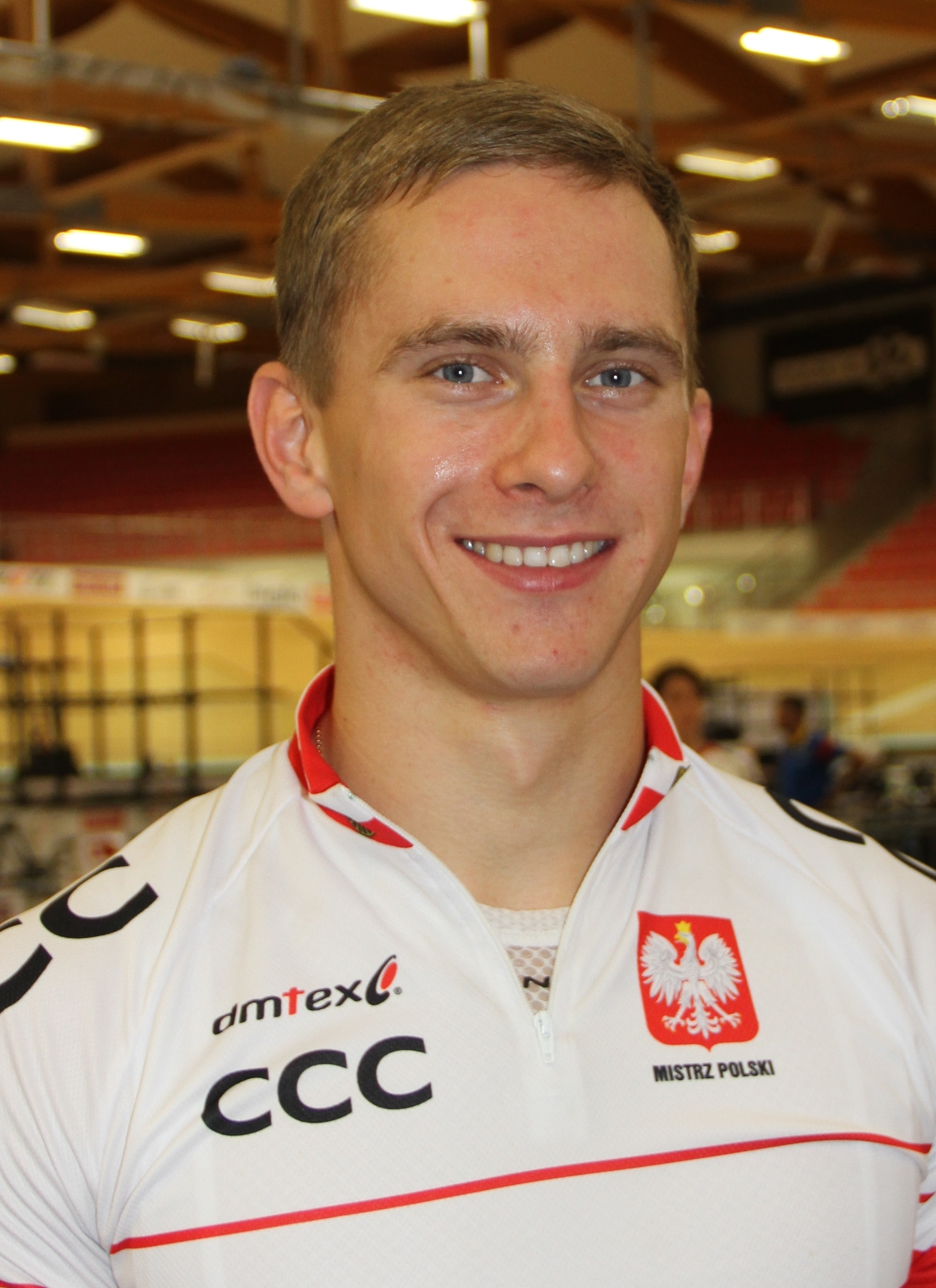
- Drejgier at the 2015 UEC European Track Championships

Personal information
- Born: 20 February 1990 (age 36) Poland

Cycling career
- Sport: Cycling
- Discipline: Track cycling
Medal record
Representing Poland
European Track Championships
Silver medal – second place	2015 Grenchen	Team sprint

Grzegorz Drejgier (born 20 February 1990) is a track cyclist from Poland.

== Career ==
As a junior rider he won the bronze medal in the team sprint at the 2008 UEC European Track Championships. In 2013 he competed at the 2013 UCI Track Cycling World Championships in the men's team sprint. He won the silver medal in the team sprint at the 2015 UEC European Track Championships in Grenchen, Switzerland.
