= Jiří Janošek =

Czech track cyclist

Personal information
- Born: 19 February 1997 (age 29) Hranice na Moravě, Czech Republic

Cycling career
- Sport: Cycling
- Discipline: Track cycling

Amateur team
- 2011 to 2021: SDJ Dukla Brno
Medal record
Men's track cycling
Representing Czech Republic
World Junior Championships
Gold medal – first place	2014 Seoul	1 km Time Trial
Gold medal – first place	2015 Astana	1 km Time Trial
European Junior Championships
Gold medal – first place	2014 Anadia	1 km Time Trial
Silver medal – second place	2015 Athens	Keirin

Jiří Janošek (born 19 February 1997) is a Czech track cyclist. Representing the Czech Republic at international competitions, he competed at the 2016 UEC European Track Championships in the team sprint event and 1km time trial event.

== Career ==
Janošek made his first appearance at the World championships in 2014 where he won the 1km time trial on the track. A feat he repeated at the European track championships later in the year.

He was named as the best European Young Athlete of 2015. This award came with a €12000 training grant to develop his career.

In 2021 Janošek won the Czech Keirin national championship.

== Major results ==
2014
1st 1 km Time Trial UCI Junior Track World Championships
1st 1 km Time Trial Junior European Track Championships
2015
1st 1 km Time Trial UCI Junior Track World Championships
1st Keirin, GP Sprint of South Moravia
1st Keirin, Cottbuser SprintCup II
2nd Keirin Junior European Track Championships
2016
2nd Team sprint Under 23 European Track Championships
4th Men's 1 km time trial, 2016 UEC European Track Championships
2019
1st National championships Team sprint
2021
1st National championships Keirin

Awards
Preceded by Anežka Drahotová	Czech Junior Athlete of the Year; 2015 (with Ester Ledecká)	Succeeded by Michaela Hrubá
