= Alexey Tkachev =

Russian cyclist

Personal information
- Full name: Alexey Vladimirovich Tkachev
- Born: 8 March 1989 (age 37)

Cycling career
- Sport: Cycling
- Discipline: Track cycling

Alexey Vladimirovich Tkachev (Russian: Алексей Владимирович Ткачев; born 8 March 1989) is a Russian male track cyclist, representing Russia at international competitions. He competed at the 2016 UEC European Track Championships in the team sprint event.
