= Robin Venneman =

Belgian cyclist

Personal information
- Born: 11 January 1993 (age 33)

Cycling career
- Sport: Cycling
- Discipline: Track cycling
Medal record
Men's track cycling
Representing Belgium

Robin Venneman (born 11 January 1993) is a Belgian male track cyclist, representing Belgium at international competitions. He competed at the 2016 UEC European Track Championships in the team sprint event.
