= Carlo Cesar =

Dutch track cyclist (born 1992)

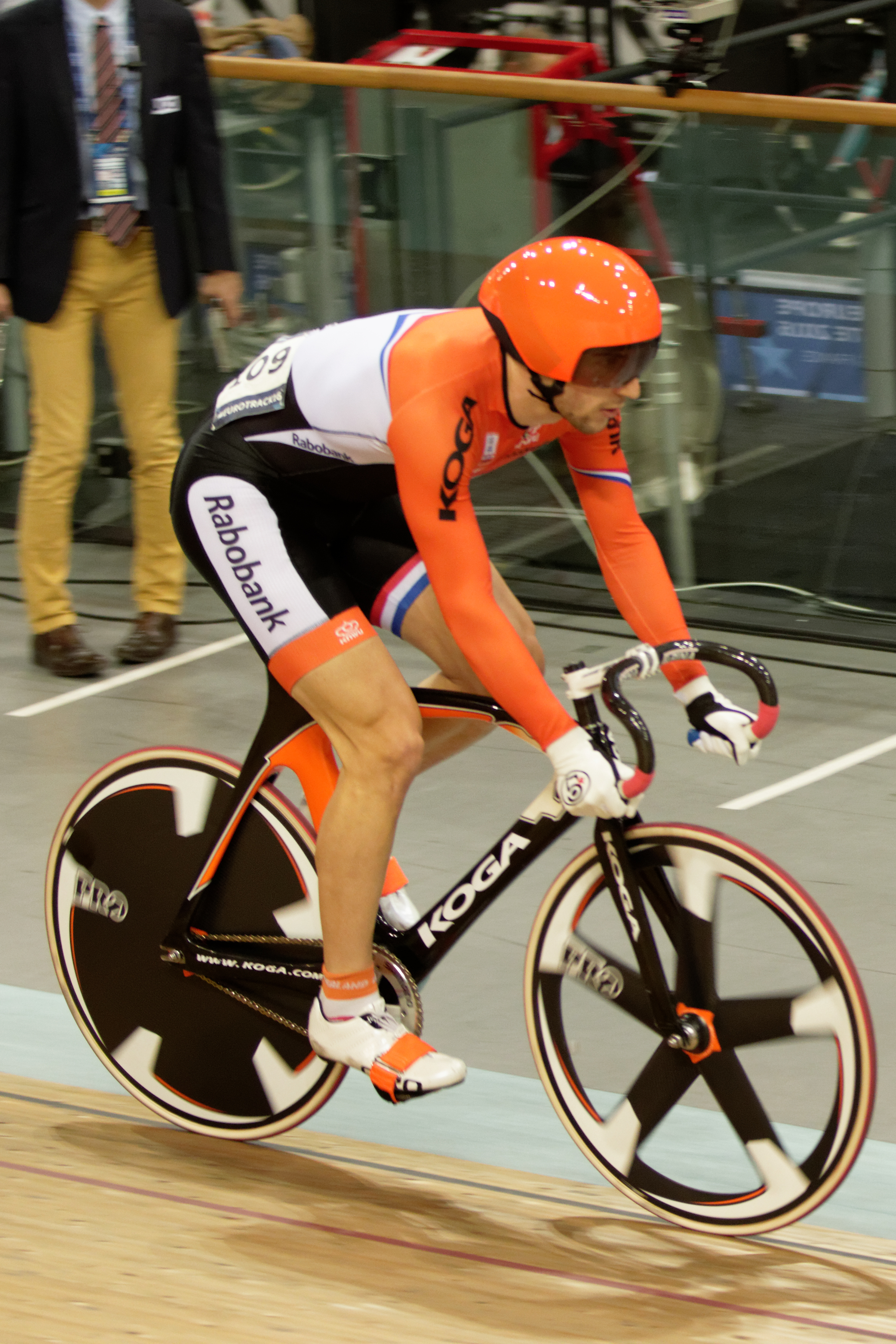
- Cesar at the 2016 UEC European Track Championships

Personal information
- Born: 7 September 1992 (age 34)
- Height: 186 cm (73 in)
- Weight: 88 kg (194 lb)

Cycling career
- Sport: Cycling
- Discipline: Track cycling
- Rider type: Sprinter
Medal record
Men's track cycling
Representing Netherlands

Carlo Cesar (born 7 September 1992) is a Dutch male former track cyclist, who represented the Netherlands at international competitions. He competed at the 2016 UEC European Track Championships in the team sprint event and keirin event.

In December 2016 he competed at the Dutch National Championships Track Cycling, where he won gold on the kilometer time trial event.

In January 2018 he quit professional track cycling and started working for the KNWU, the Dutch Cycling Federation.
