= Gerald Nys =

Belgian cyclist

Cycling career
- Sport: Cycling
- Discipline: Track cycling

Gerald Nys is a Belgian male track cyclist, representing Belgium at international competitions. He competed at the 2016 UEC European Track Championships in the team sprint event.
