= Eric Engler =

German cyclist (born 1991)

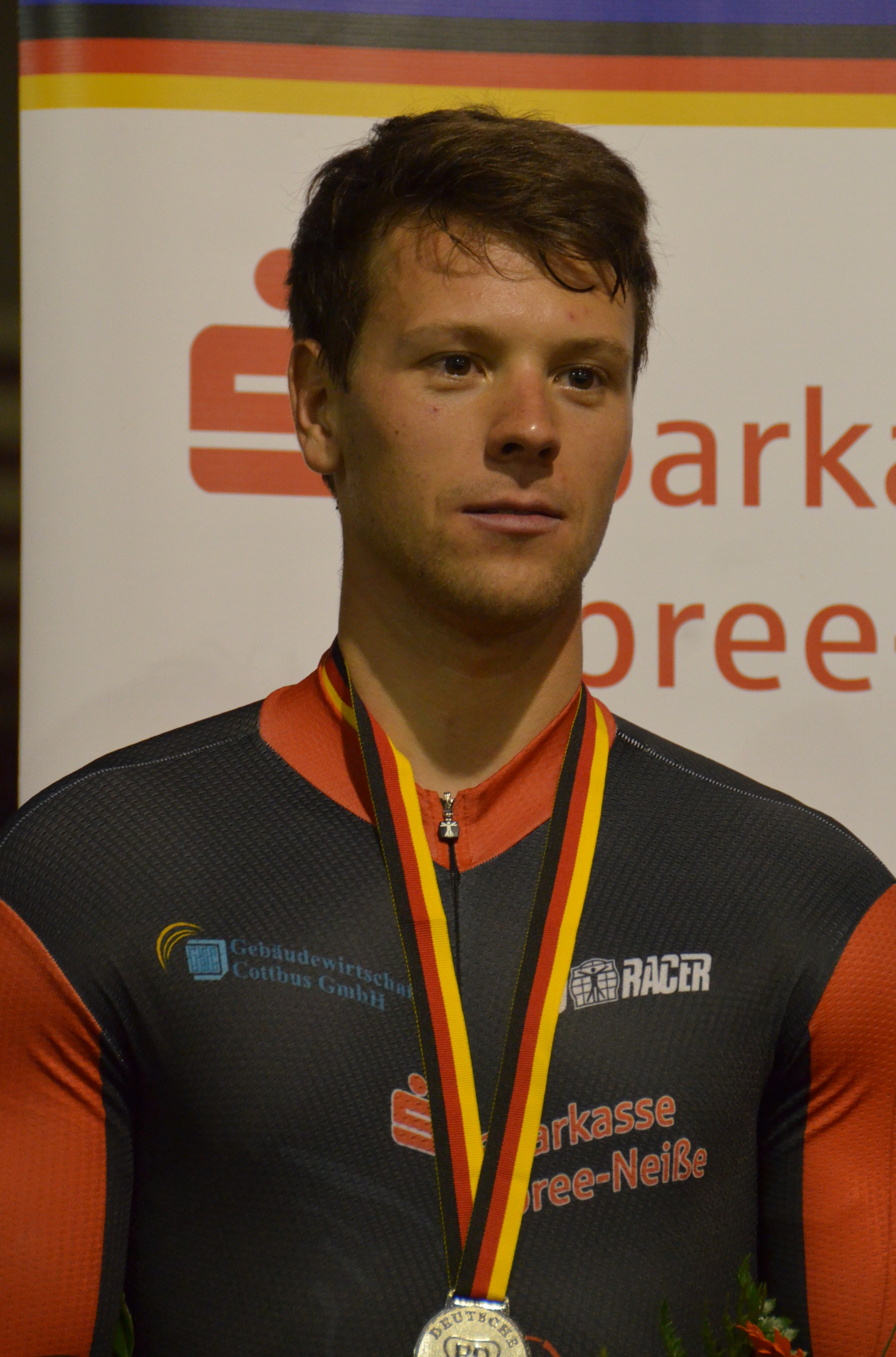
- Eric Engler in 2014

Personal information
- Born: 21 September 1991 (age 35) Cottbus, Germany

Cycling career
- Sport: Cycling
- Role: Rider
Medal record
European Championships
Silver medal – second place	2016 Yvelines	Time trial
Bronze medal – third place	2016 Yvelines	Team sprint

Eric Engler (born 21 September 1991) is a German professional racing cyclist. He rode at the 2015 UCI Track Cycling World Championships.
