= Jan May =

German cyclist (born 1995)

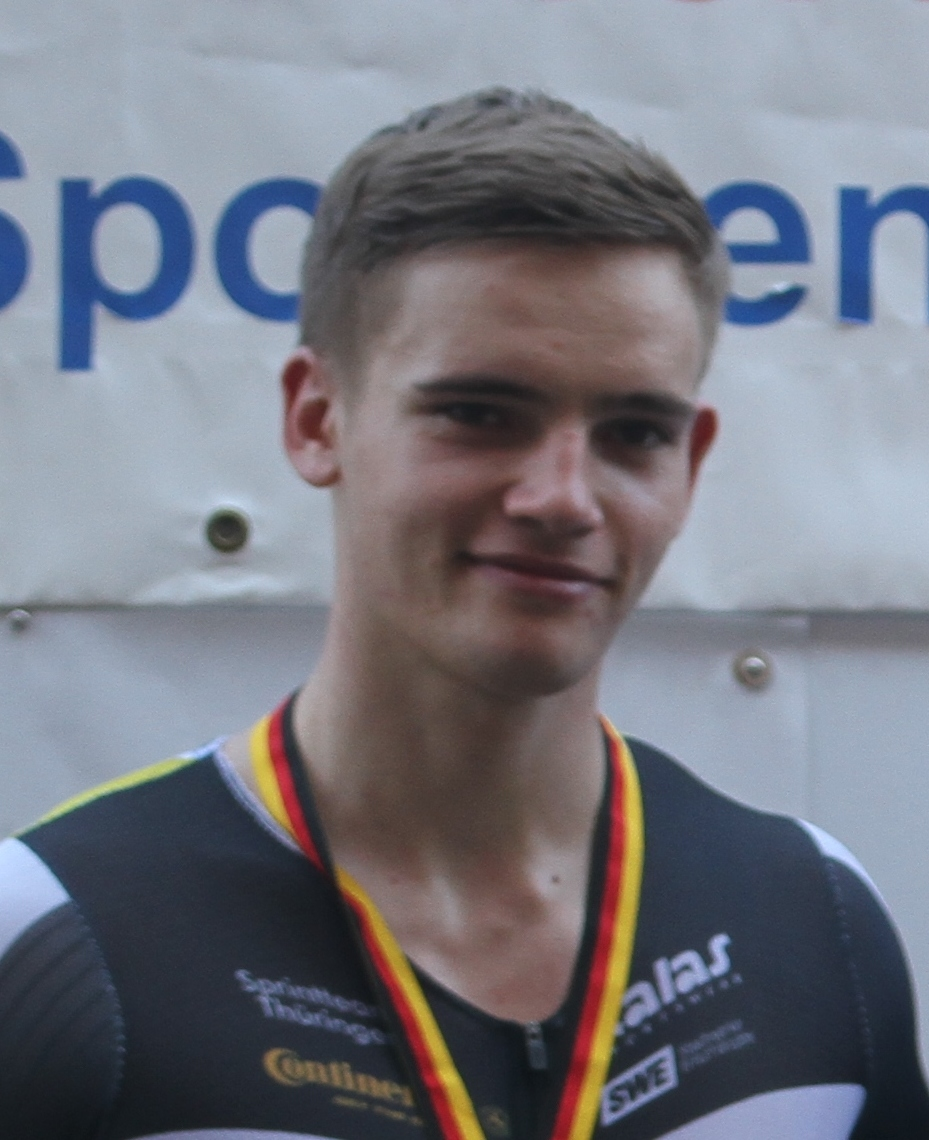
- Jan May,2016

Personal information
- Born: 11 June 1995 (age 31) Landau

Cycling career
- Sport: Cycling
- Discipline: Track cycling
Medal record
Men's track cycling
Representing Germany
UEC European Track Championships
Bronze medal – third place	2016 Saint-Quentin-en-Yvelines	Team Sprint

Jan May (born 11 June 1995 in Landau) is a German male track cyclist, representing Germany at international competitions. He won the bronze medal at the 2016 UEC European Track Championships in the team sprint.
