= Anargyros Sotirakopoulos =

Greek cyclist (born 1992)

Personal information
- Born: 21 February 1992 (age 34)

Cycling career
- Sport: Cycling
- Discipline: Track cycling

Anargyros Sotirakopoulos (born 21 February 1992) is a Greek male track cyclist, representing Greece at international competitions. He competed at the 2016 UEC European Track Championships in the 1 km time trial event.
