= Kirill Samusenko =

Russian cyclist

Personal information
- Born: 8 May 1992 (age 34)

Cycling career
- Sport: Cycling
- Discipline: Track cycling

Kirill Samusenko (born 8 May 1992) is a Russian male track cyclist, representing Russia at international competitions. He competed at the 2016 UEC European Track Championships in the team sprint event.
