= Davide Ceci =

Italian cyclist (born 1993)

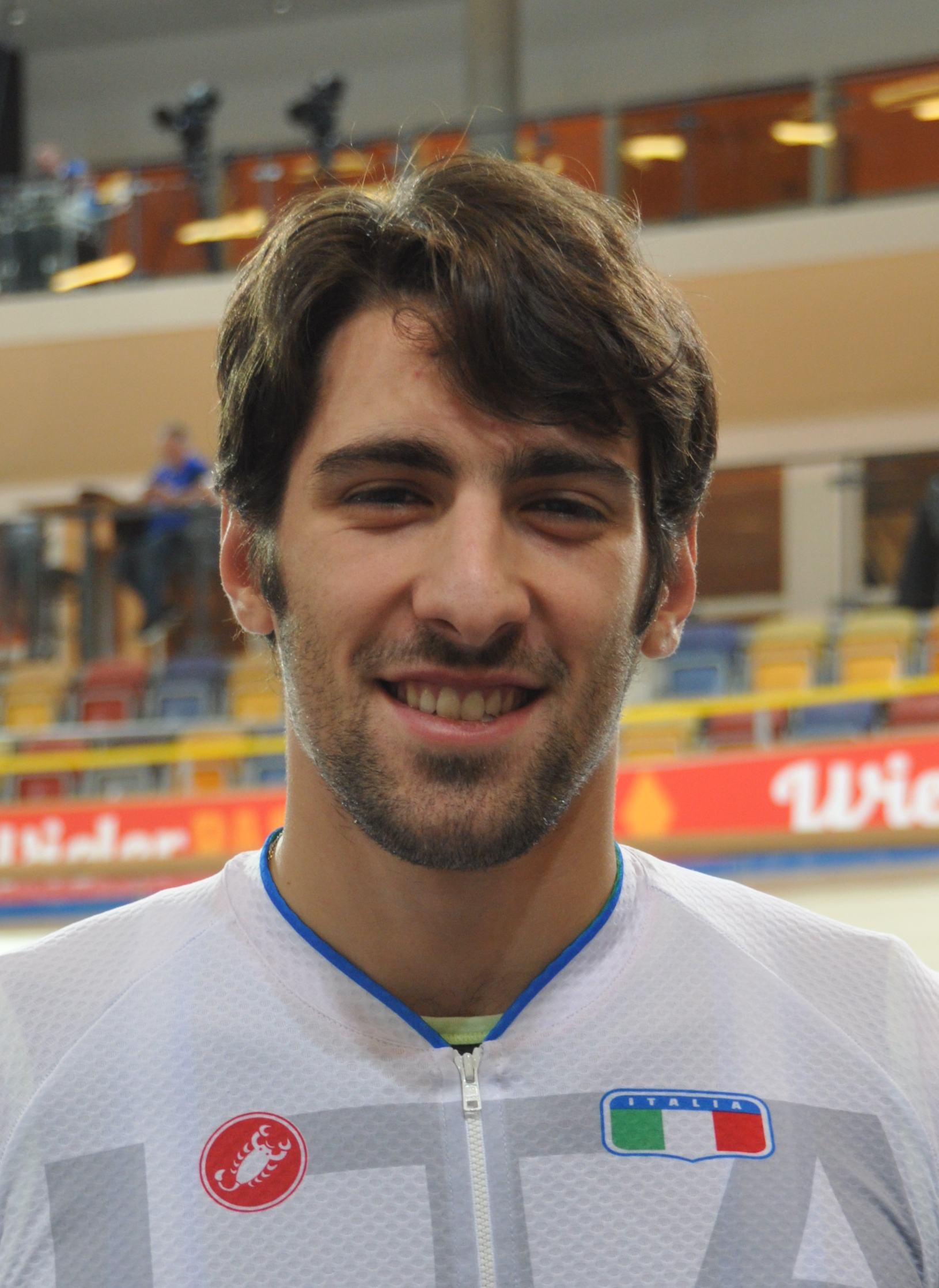
- Davide Ceci (2016)

Personal information
- Born: 6 September 1993 (age 33)

Cycling career
- Sport: Cycling
- Discipline: Track cycling

Davide Ceci (born 6 September 1993) is an Italian male track cyclist, representing Italy at international competitions. He competed at the 2016 UEC European Track Championships in the team sprint event.
