= Davit Askurava =

Georgian male track cyclist

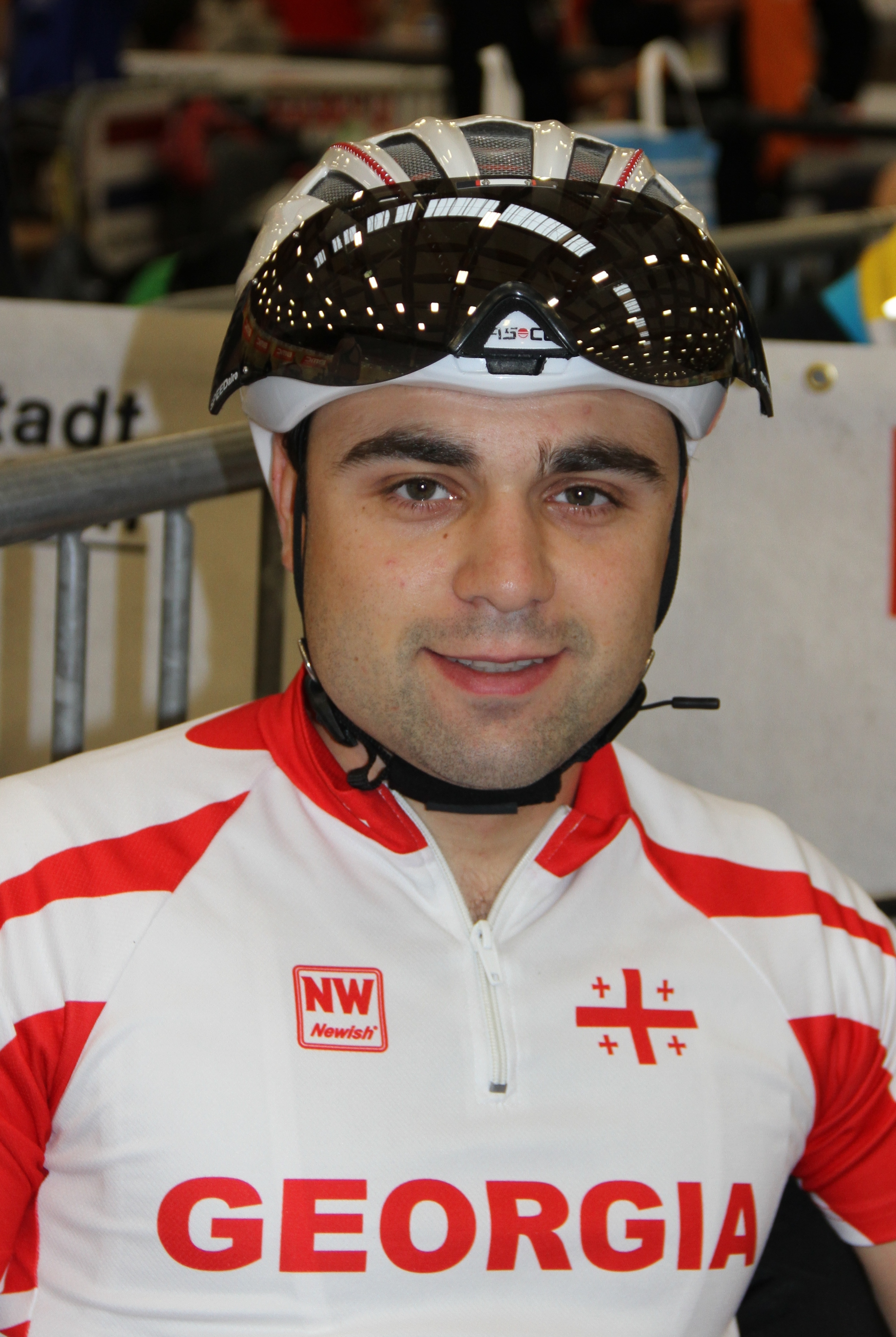
- Davit Askurava (2015)

Personal information
- Born: 29 July 1990 (age 36) Tbilisi, Georgian SSR, USSR

Cycling career
- Sport: Cycling
- Discipline: Track cycling

Davit Askurava (Georgian: დავით ასკურავა; born 29 July 1990) is a Georgian male track cyclist, representing Georgia at international competitions. He competed at the 2016 UEC European Track Championships in the 1 km time trial event.
