= Andriy Vynokurov =

Ukrainian cyclist

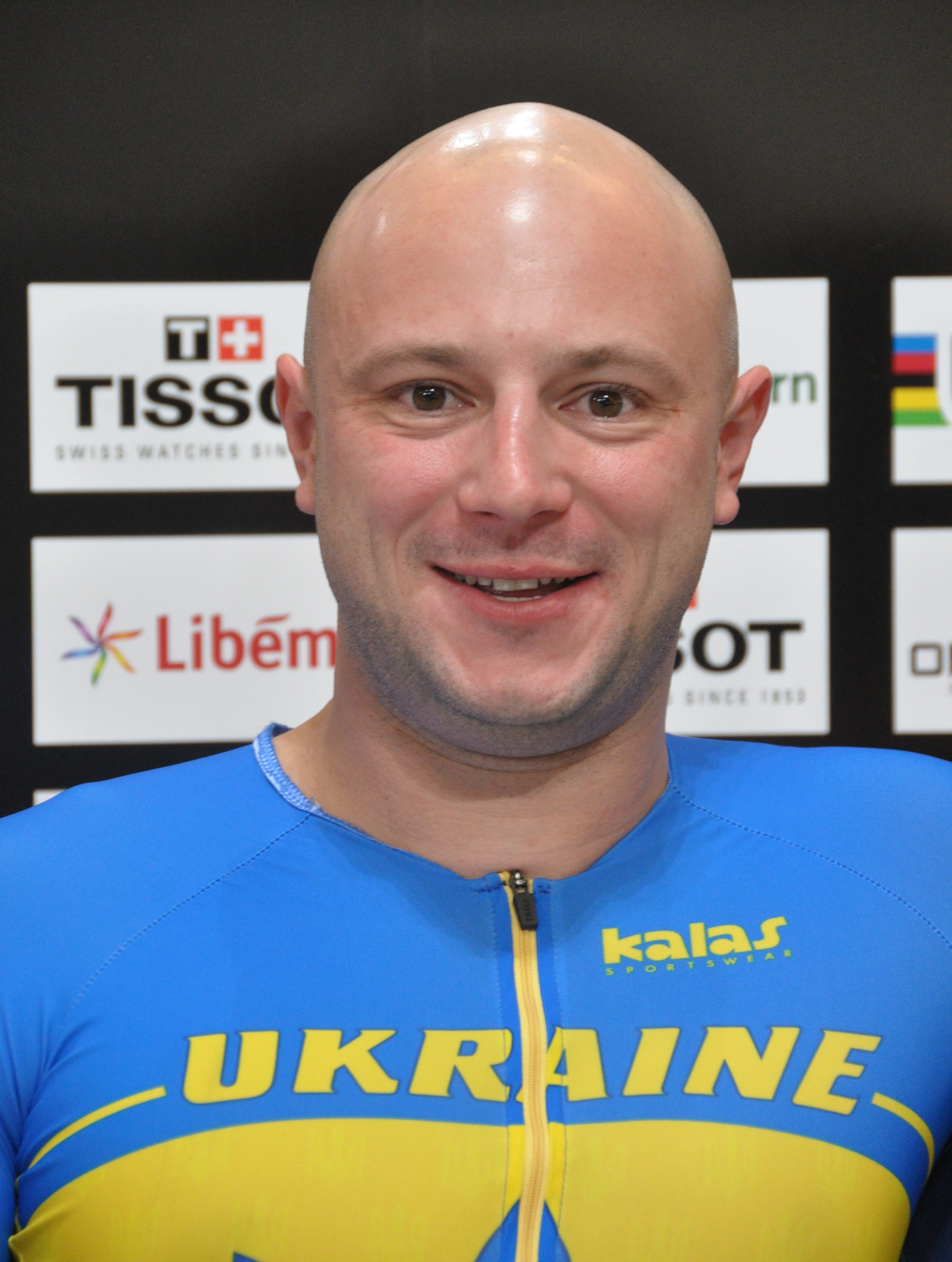

Personal information
- Full name: Andriy Vynokurov (2016)
- Born: August 14, 1982 (age 44) Kharkiv, Ukrainian SSR, Soviet Union

Cycling career
- Sport: Cycling
- Discipline: Track
- Role: Rider
- Rider type: Sprint
Medal record
Representing Ukraine
Men's track cycling
European Championships
Silver medal – second place	2016 Yvelines	Keirin
Bronze medal – third place	2016 Yvelines	Sprint
Bronze medal – third place	2017 Berlin	Keirin
World Junior Championships
Silver medal – second place	2000 Fiorenzuola	1 km time trial
Bronze medal – third place	2000 Fiorenzuola	Sprint
European U23 Championships
Gold medal – first place	2001 Brno	Keirin
Gold medal – first place	2001 Brno	Sprint
Gold medal – first place	2004 Valencia	Keirin

Andriy Vynokurov (born August 14, 1982) is a Ukrainian professional track cyclist.

== Palmarès ==
2002
2002 World Cup

2nd, 1 km, Moscow

2005
2005–2006 World Cup

1st, Keirin, Moscow

2006
2006–2007 World Cup

1st, Keirin, Moscow

2008
2007–2008 World Cup

3rd, Sprint, Copenhagen
