= Sergio Aliaga =

Spanish cyclist

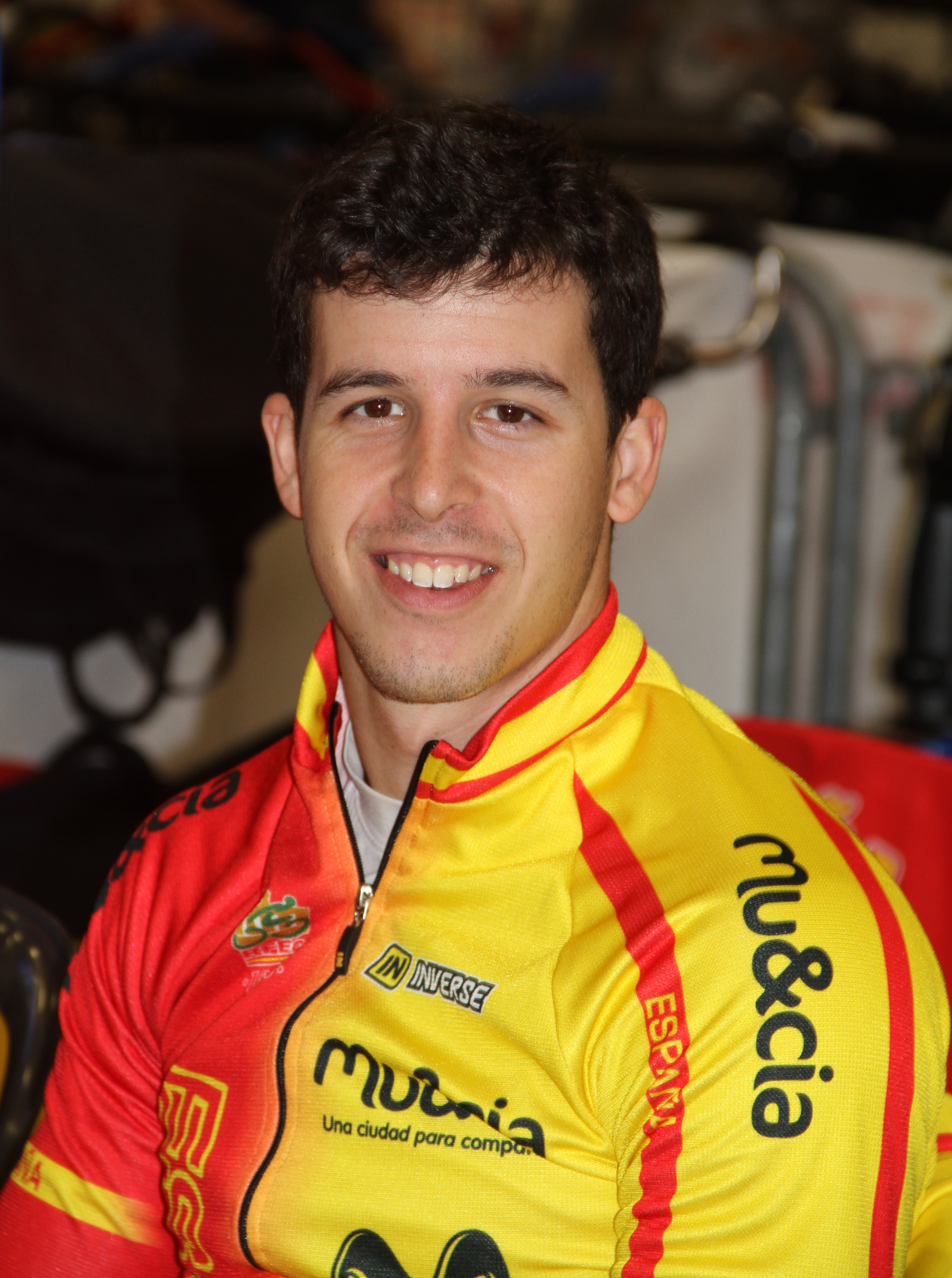
- Sergio Aliaga (2015)

Personal information
- Full name: Sergio Aliaga Chivite
- Born: 26 October 1991 (age 34) Cintruénigo, Spain
- Height: 1.83 m (6 ft 0 in)
- Weight: 92 kg (203 lb)

Cycling career
- Sport: Cycling
- Discipline: Track cycling
- Role: Rider
- Rider type: team sprint

Sergio Aliaga Chivite (born 26 October 1991) is a Spanish male track cyclist. He competed in the team sprint event at the 2015 UCI Track Cycling World Championships.
