= Krzysztof Maksel =

Polish cyclist (born 1991)

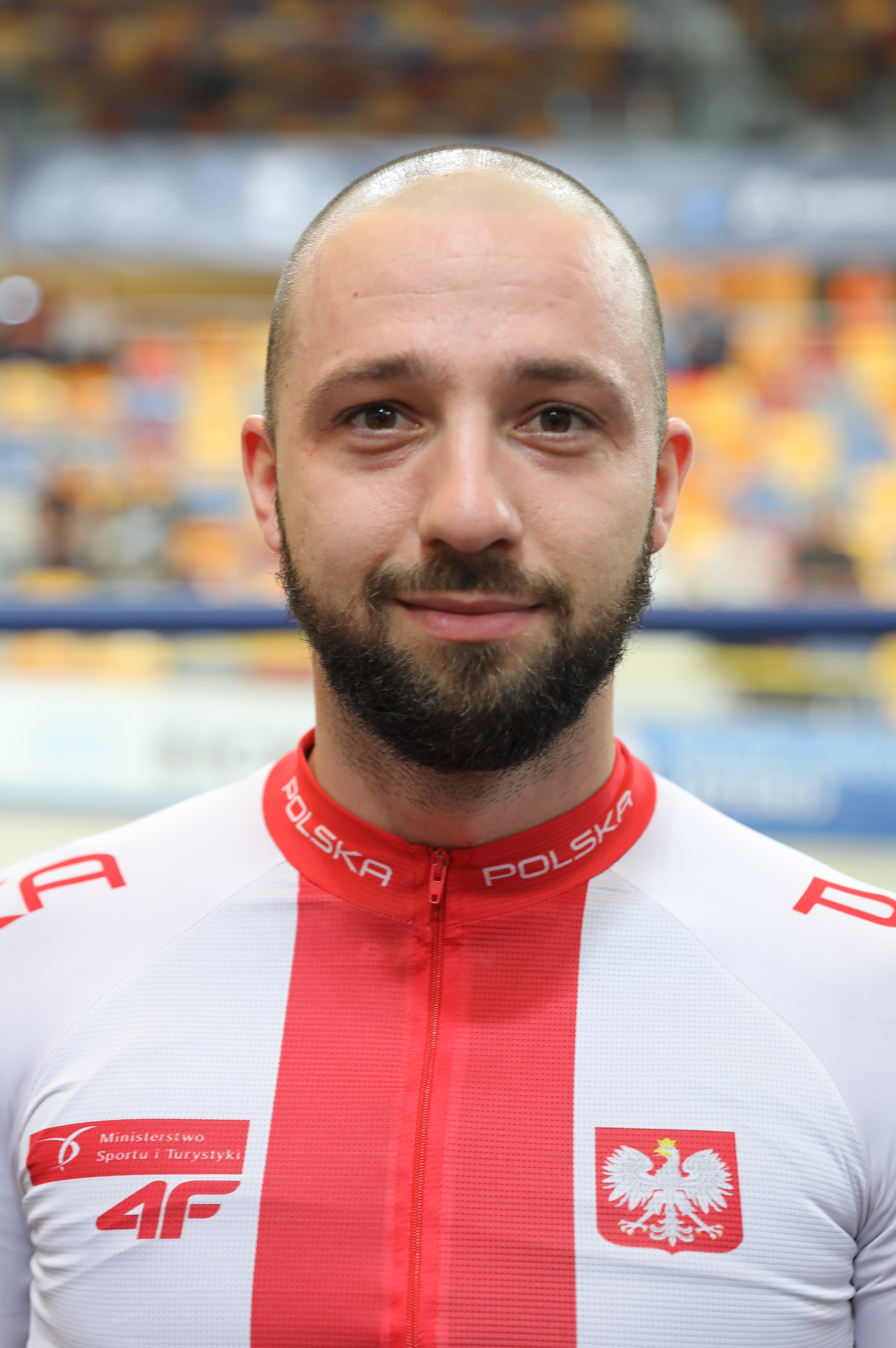
- Krzysztof Maksel (2019)

Personal information
- Born: 4 July 1991 (age 35) Paczków, Poland

Cycling career
- Sport: Cycling
- Role: Rider
Medal record
Representing Poland
European Games
Bronze medal – third place	2019 Minsk	Time trial
European Championships
Silver medal – second place	2012 Panevėžys	Team sprint
Silver medal – second place	2015 Grenchen	Team sprint

Krzysztof Maksel (born 4 July 1991) is a Polish professional racing cyclist. He rode at the 2015 UCI Track Cycling World Championships.
