= Ayrton De Pauw =

Belgian cyclist

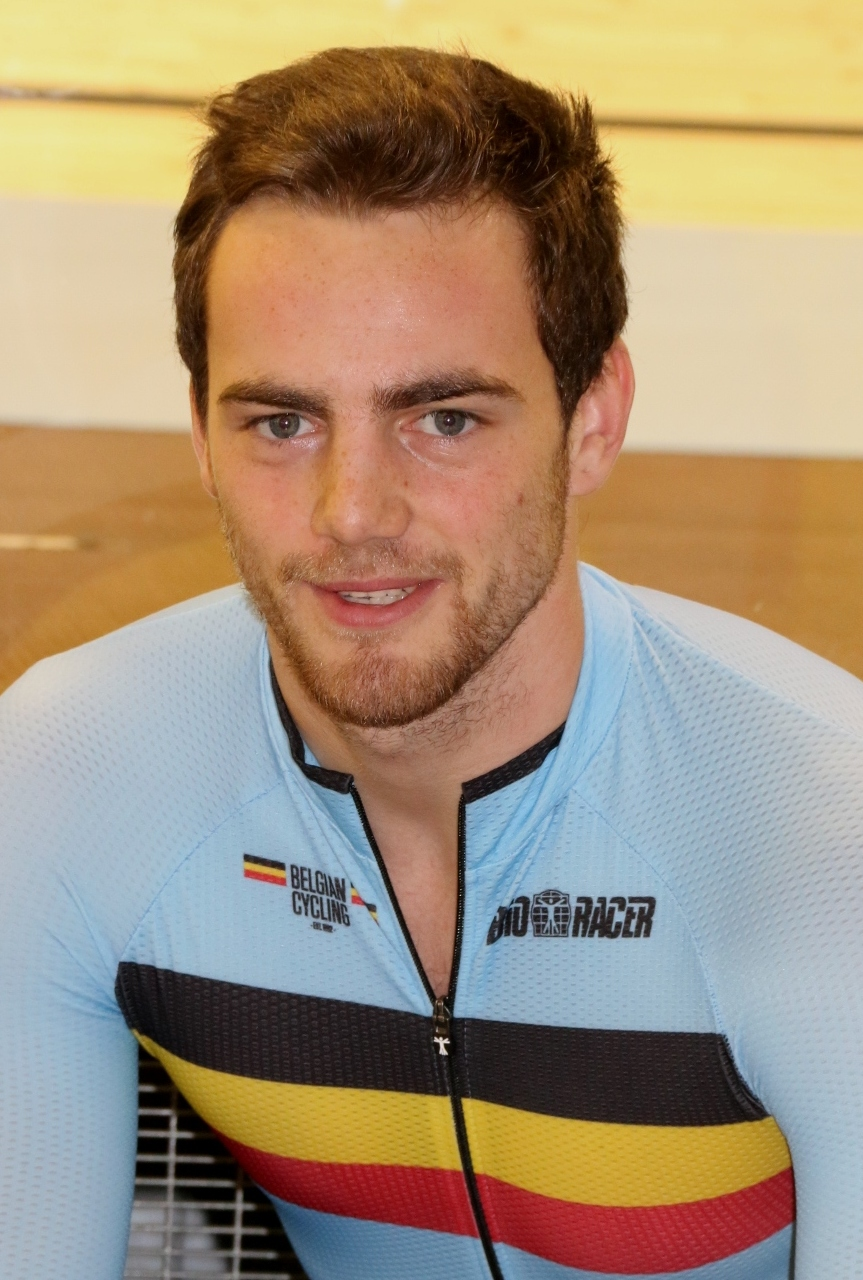
- De Pauw (2017)

Personal information
- Born: 12 March 1998 (age 28)

Cycling career
- Sport: Cycling
- Discipline: Track cycling

Ayrton De Pauw (born 12 March 1998) is a Belgian male track cyclist, representing Belgium at international competitions. He competed at the 2016 UEC European Track Championships in the team sprint event and 1 km time trial event.
