= Mateusz Lipa =

Polish cyclist

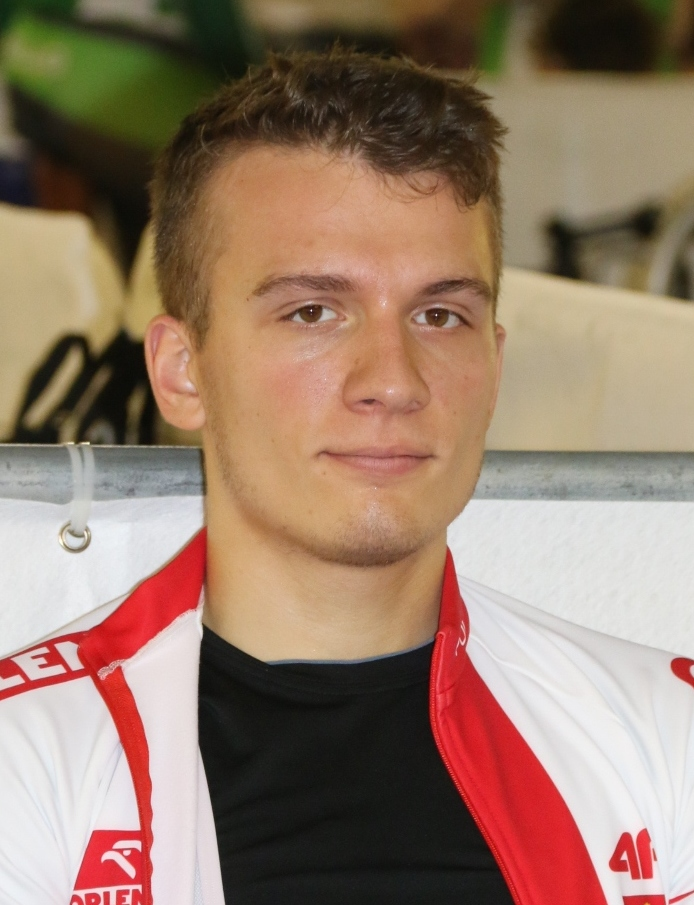
- Mateusz Lipa (2017)

Personal information
- Born: 7 November 1994 (age 31)

Cycling career
- Sport: Cycling
- Role: Rider
Medal record
Men's track cycling
Representing Poland
UEC European Track Championships
Gold medal – first place	2016 Yvelines	Team Sprint

Mateusz Lipa (born 7 November 1994) is a Polish professional racing cyclist. He rode at the 2015 UCI Track Cycling World Championships.
