= Tomáš Bábek =

Czech cyclist (born 1987)

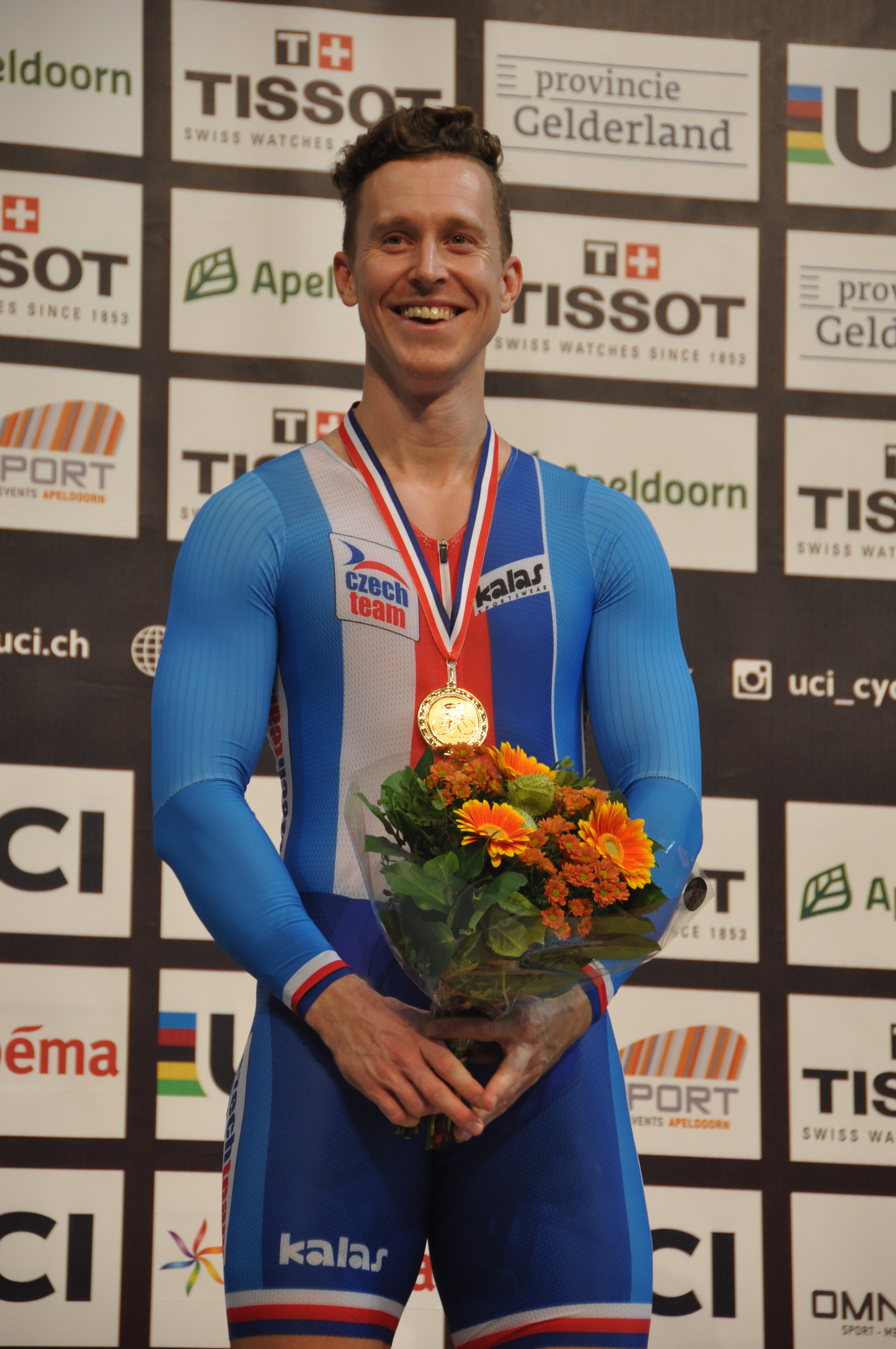
- Tomáš Bábek (2016)

Personal information
- Born: 4 June 1987 (age 39) Brno, Czechoslovakia
- Height: 1.86 m (6 ft 1 in)
- Weight: 84 kg (185 lb)

Cycling career
- Sport: Cycling
- Discipline: Track
- Role: Rider
- Rider type: Sprinter
Medal record
Men's track cycling
Representing Czech Republic
World Championships
Silver medal – second place	2017 Hong Kong	1km time trial
Bronze medal – third place	2017 Hong Kong	Keirin
European Games
Gold medal – first place	2019 Minsk	1km time trial
European Championships
Gold medal – first place	2016 Yvelines	Keirin
Gold medal – first place	2020 Plovdiv	1km time trial
Silver medal – second place	2020 Plovdiv	Team sprint
Bronze medal – third place	2016 Yvelines	1km time trial
U23 & Junior European Championships
Bronze medal – third place	2008 Pruszków	U23 1km time trial

Tomáš Bábek (born 4 June 1987) is a Czech track cyclist. He shared the men's sprint title with Adam Ptáčník and Denis Špička at the Czech Track Cycling Championships, and later represented the Czech Republic at the 2008 Summer Olympics. On that same year, Babek also claimed the bronze medal in the 1 km time trial at the European Championships in Pruszków, Poland.

Babek qualified for the Czech squad in the men's team sprint at the 2008 Summer Olympics in Beijing by receiving one of the team's three available berths based on UCI's selection process from the Track World Rankings. Babek and his teammates Ptacnik and Spicka battled in an opening heat against the U.S. trio of Michael Blatchford, Giddeon Massie, and Adam Duvendeck with an eleventh-place time in 45.678 and an average speed of 59.109 km/h, failing to advance further to the top eight match round.

== Career highlights ==
2007

- (gold) Czech Track Cycling Championships (1 km time trial), Brno (CZE)

2008

- (gold) Czech Track Cycling Championships (1 km time trial), Brno (CZE)
- (gold) Czech Track Cycling Championships (Team sprint with Adam Ptáčník and Denis Špička), Brno (CZE)
- (bronze) European Championships (1 km time trial), Pruszków (POL)
- 11th Olympic Games (Team sprint with Adam Ptáčník and Denis Špička), Beijing (CHN)

2010

- 12th UCI World Championships (Team sprint), Copenhagen (DEN)
- 32nd UCI World Championships (Sprint), Copenhagen (DEN)

2012

- (bronze) Czech Track Cycling Championships (1 km time trial), Brno (CZE)

2013

- (bronze) Czech Track Cycling Championships (Keirin), Brno (CZE)

2016

- (gold) UEC European Track Championships (Keirin), Saint-Quentin-en-Yvelines, France
