= Uladzislau Novik =

Belarusian cyclist

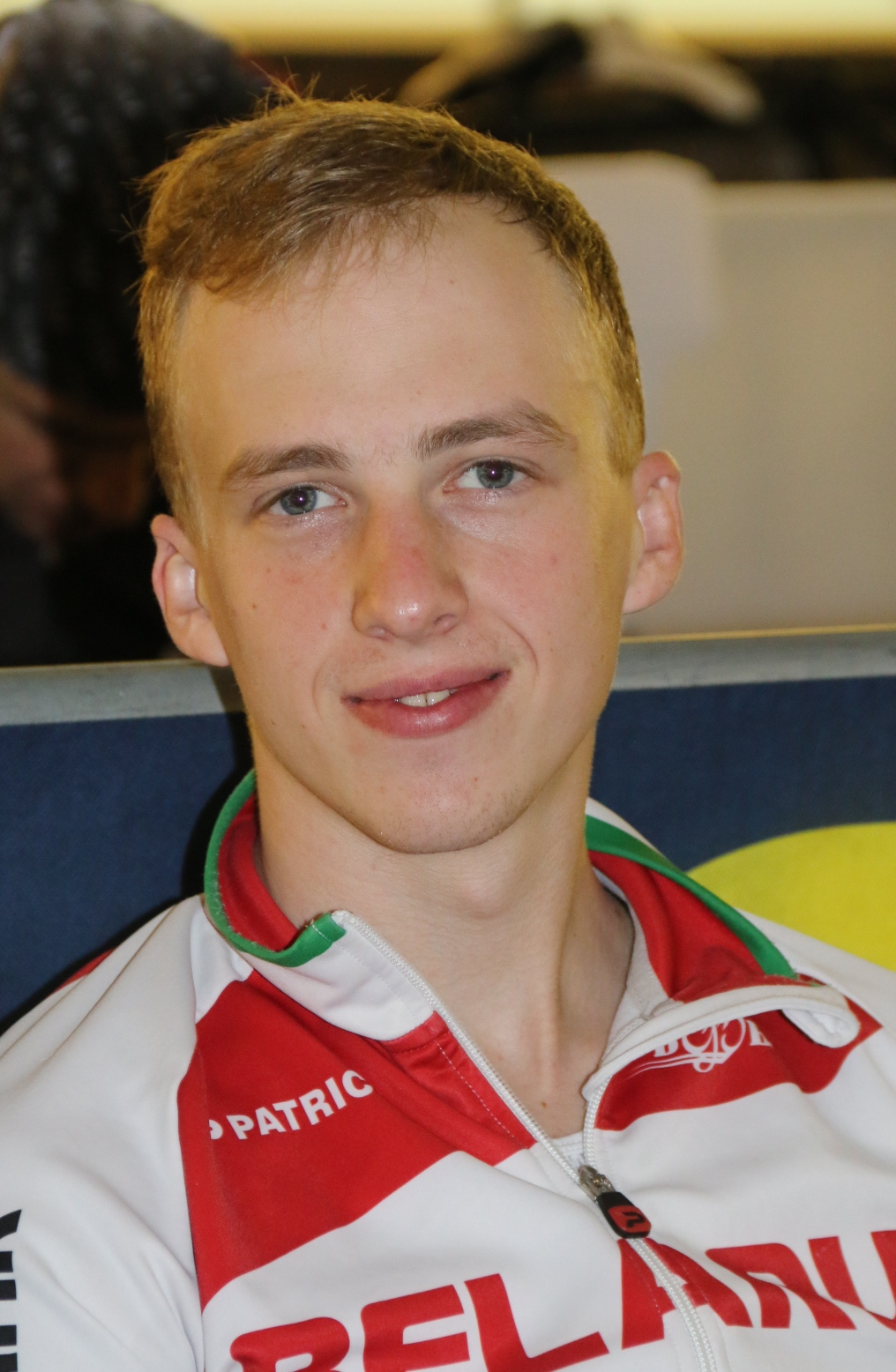

Personal information
- Born: 31 March 1995 (age 31)

Cycling career
- Sport: Cycling
- Discipline: Track cycling

Uladzislau Novik (born 31 March 1995) is a Belarusian male track cyclist, representing Belarus at international competitions. He competed at the 2016 UEC European Track Championships, in the team sprint event.
