= Luca Ceci =

Italian cyclist

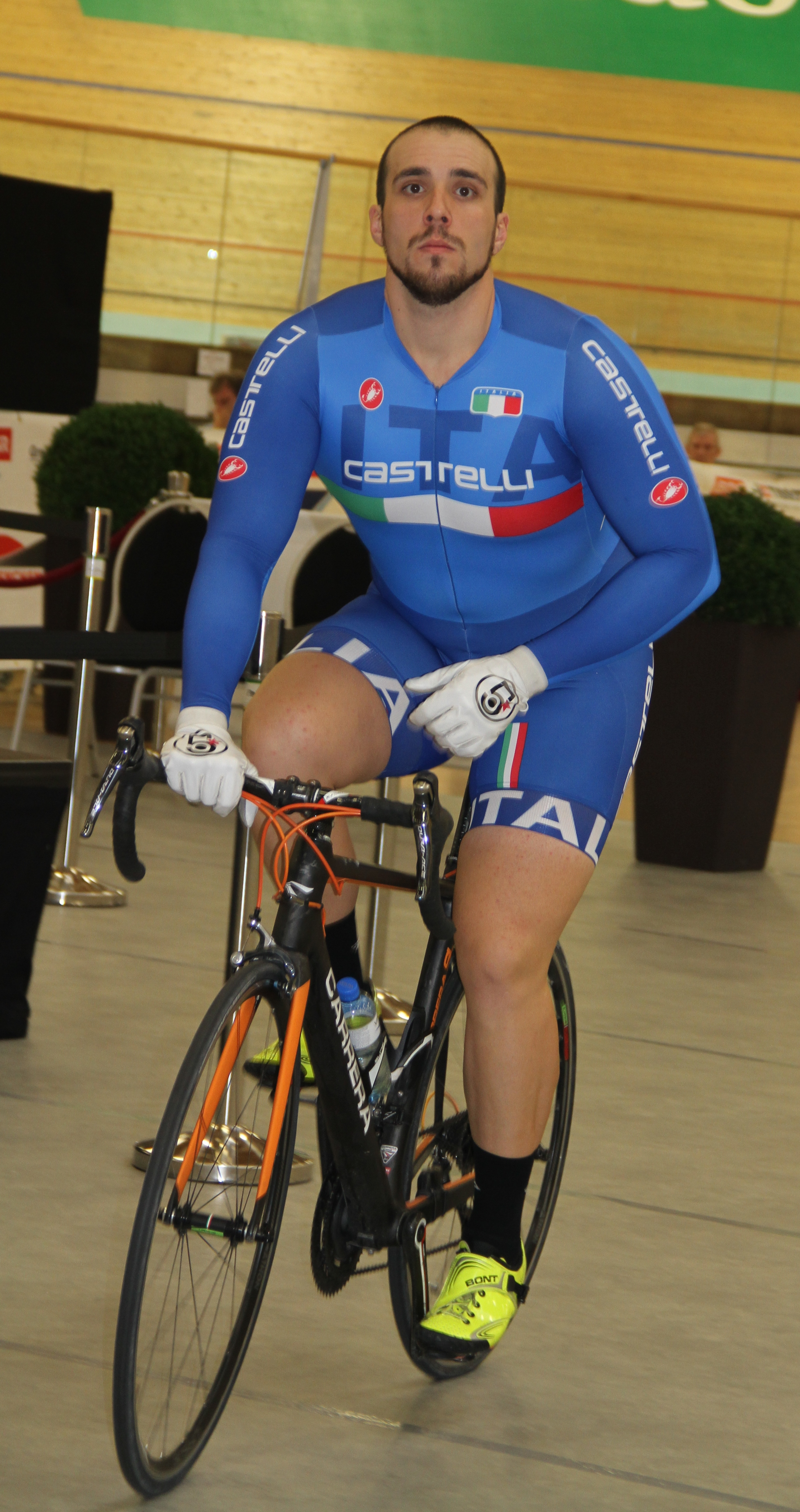

Personal information
- Born: 31 December 1988 (age 37)

Cycling career
- Sport: Cycling
- Discipline: Track cycling
- Role: Rider
- Rider type: sprinter

Luca Ceci (born 31 December 1988) is an Italian male track cyclist, riding for the national team. He competed in the sprint and team sprint event at the 2010 UCI Track Cycling World Championships.
