= Sándor Szalontay =

Hungarian cyclist

Sandor Szalontay
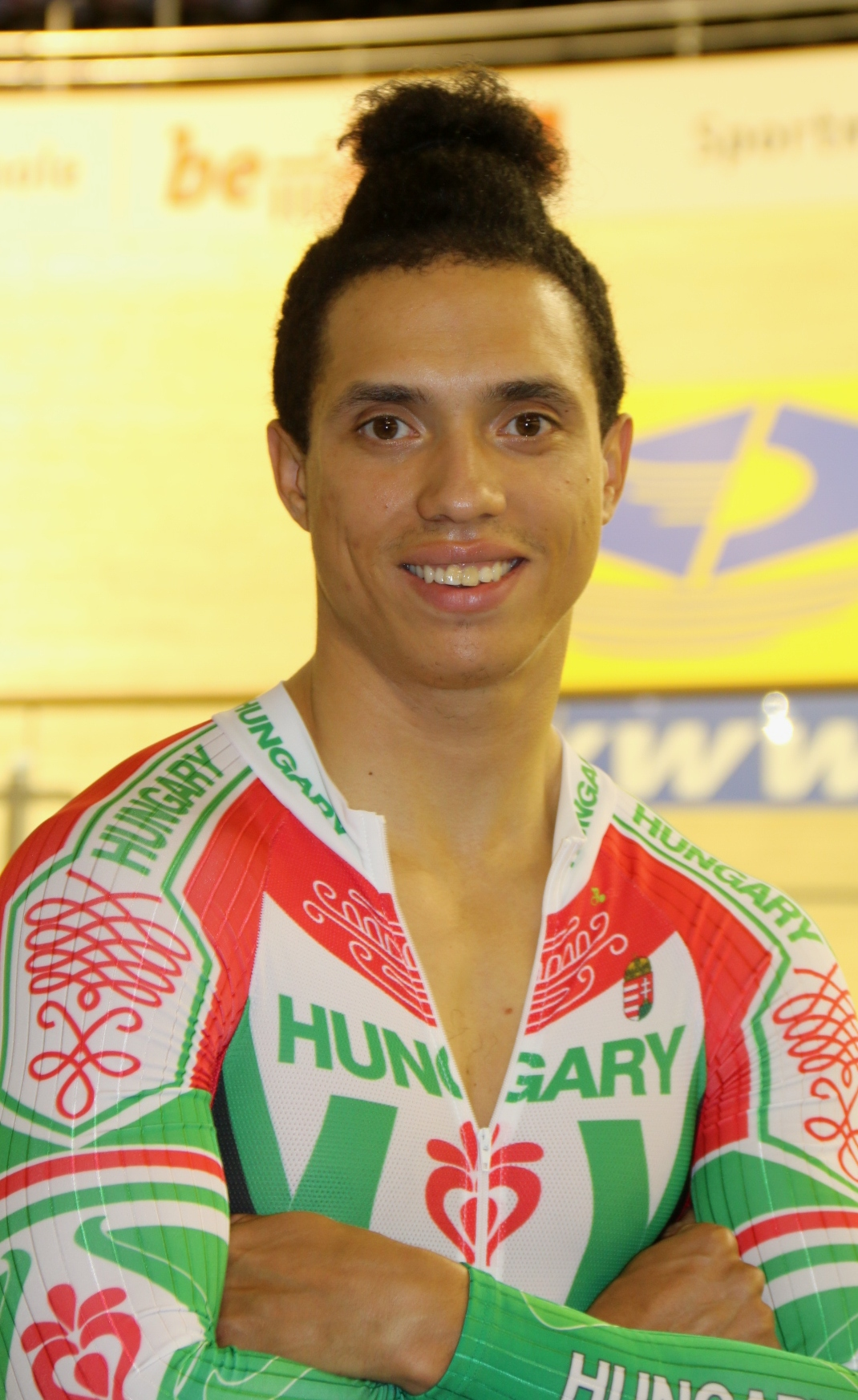
- Sandor Szalontay (2017)

Personal information
- Born: 3 July 1990 (age 36)

Cycling career
- Sport: Cycling
- Discipline: Track cycling
Medal record
Men's track cycling
Representing Hungary

Sandor Szalontay (born 3 July 1990) is a Hungarian male track cyclist, representing Hungary at international competitions. He competed at the 2015 UEC European Track Championships in the sprint event and at the 2016 UEC European Track Championships in the 1 km time trial event.
