= Miroslav Minchev =

Bulgarian cyclist

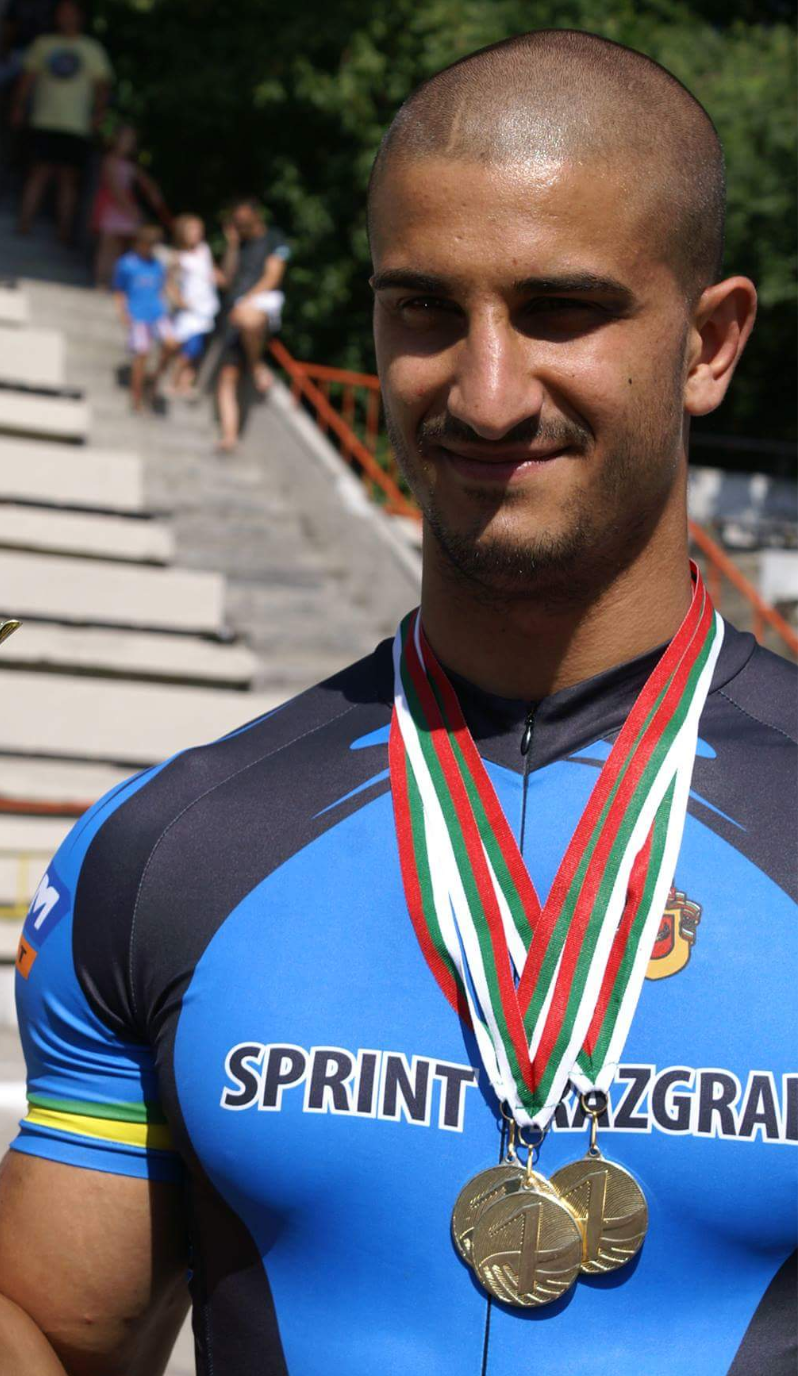

Personal information
- Full name: Мирослав Минчев
- Born: 17 January 1989 (age 37)

Cycling career
- Sport: Cycling
- Discipline: Track cycling

Miroslav Minchev (born 17 January 1989) is a Bulgarian male track cyclist, representing Bulgaria at international competitions. He competed at the 2016 UEC European Track Championships in the team sprint event and the 1km time trial event.
