= Svajūnas Jonauskas =

Lithuanian cyclist (born 1995)

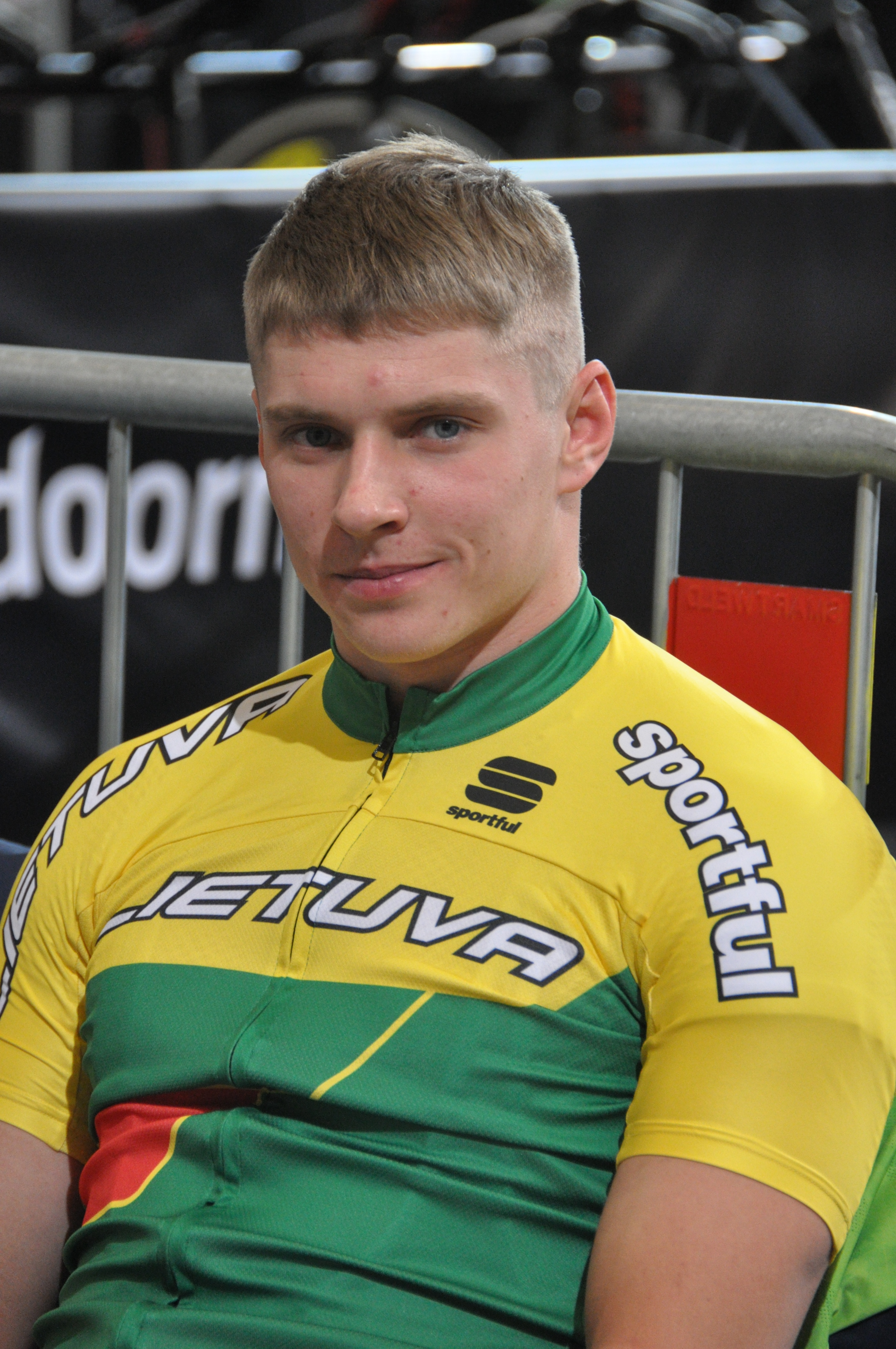

Personal information
- Born: 2 January 1995 (age 31)

Cycling career
- Sport: Cycling
- Role: Rider

Svajūnas Jonauskas (born 2 January 1995) is a Lithuanian racing cyclist. He rode in the men's sprint event at the 2018 UCI Track Cycling World Championships.
