= Juan Peralta =

Spanish cyclist (born 1990)

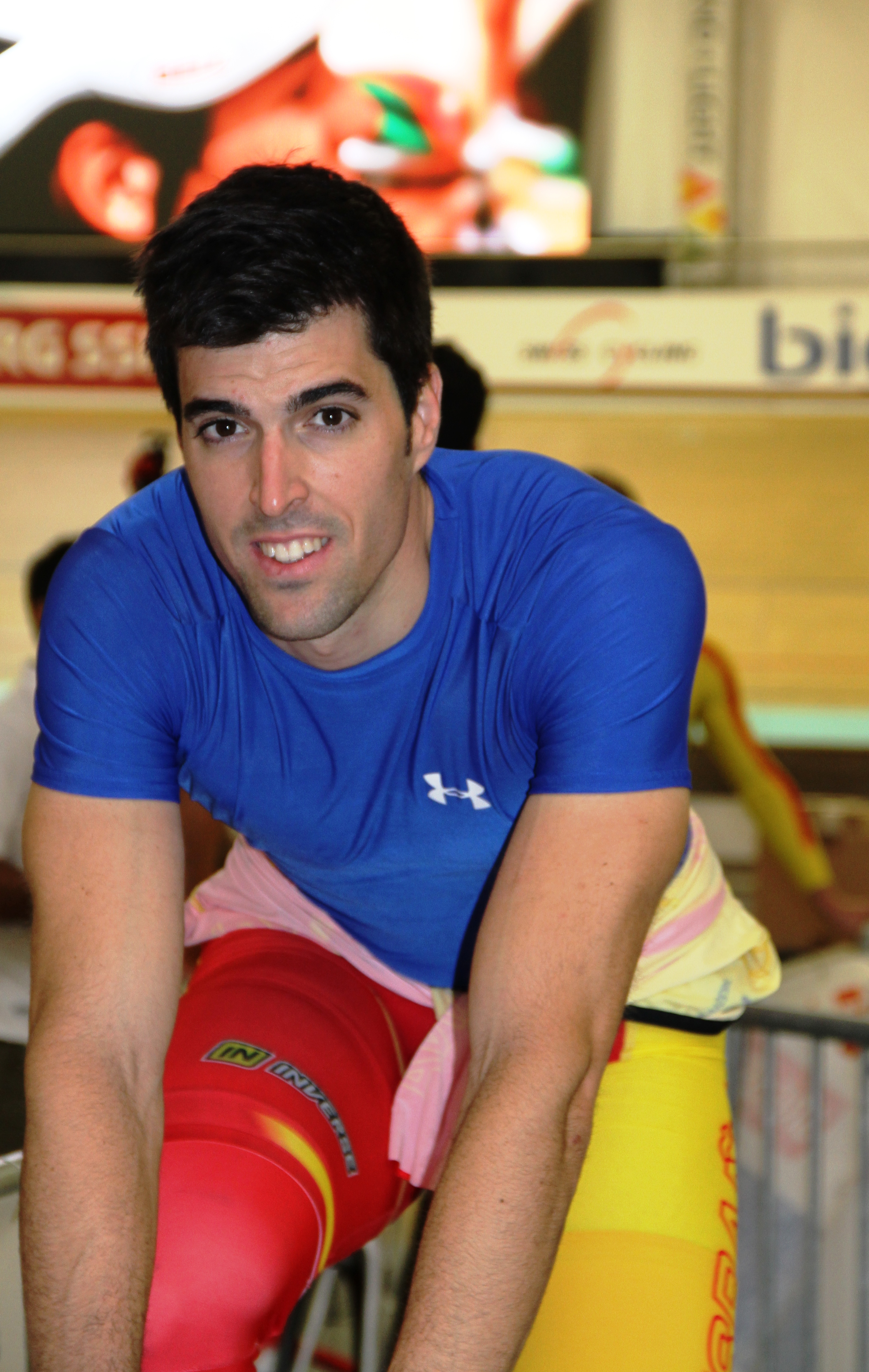
- Peralta at the 2015 UEC European Track Championships

Personal information
- National team: Spanish
- Born: 17 May 1990 (age 34)

Sport
- Country: Spain
- Event: racing cyclist
- Updated on 16 August 2016

Juan Peralta Gascon (born 17 May 1990, Pamplona) is a Spanish racing cyclist. He competed in keirin at the 2012 Summer Olympics in London. At the 2016 Summer Olympics he competed in the men's sprint.
