= Artsiom Zaitsau =

Belarusian cyclist (born 1995)

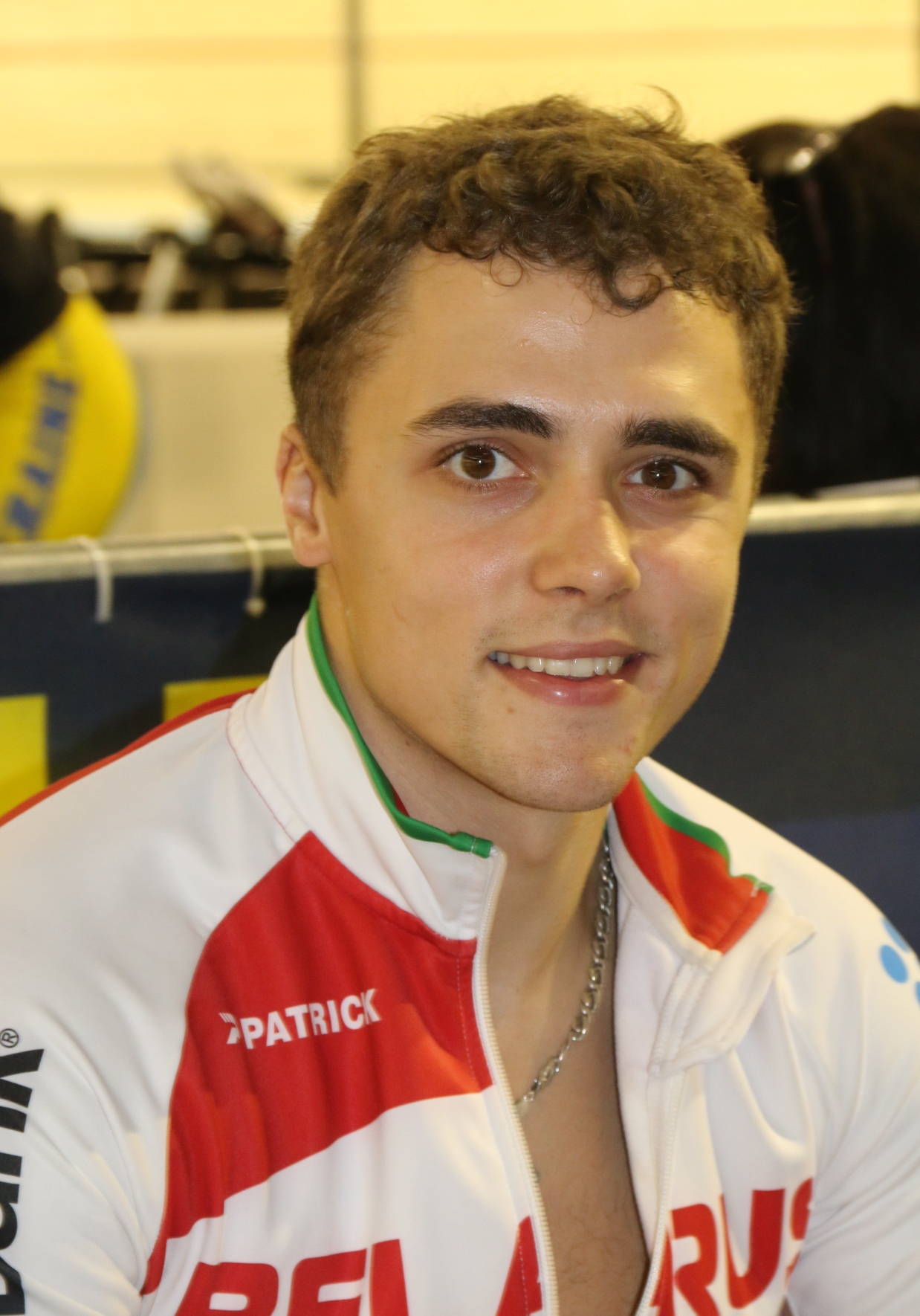
- Artsiom Zaitsau

Personal information
- Nickname: Artsiom
- Born: 13 May 1995 (age 31) Belarus
- Height: 172 cm (68 in)
- Weight: 84 kg (185 lb)

Cycling career
- Sport: Cycling
- Discipline: Track cycling

Artsiom Zaitsau (born 13 May 1995) is a Belarusian male track cyclist, representing Belarus at international competitions. He competed at the 2016 UEC European Track Championships in the team sprint event.
