= José Moreno Sánchez =

Spanish cyclist

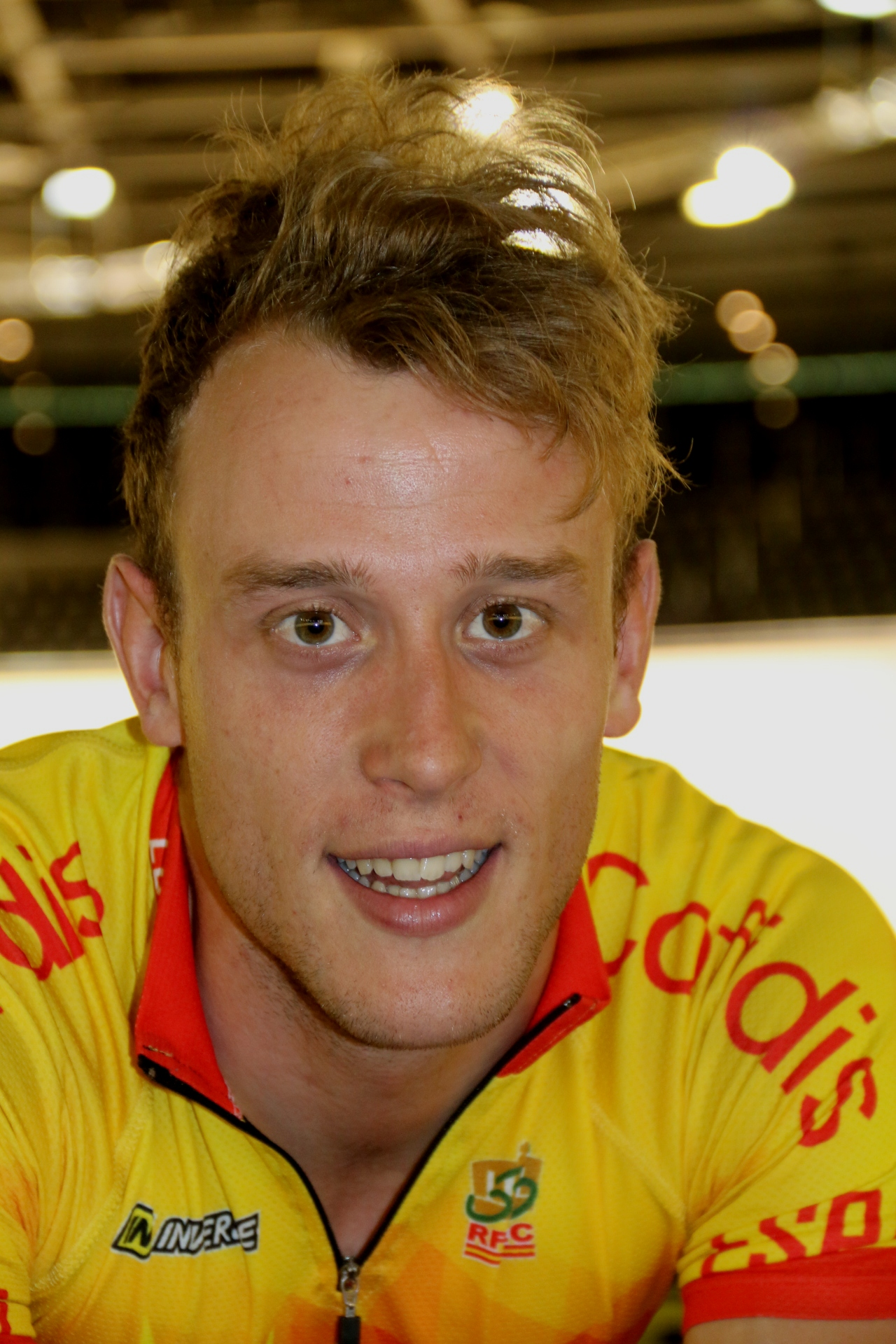
- José Moreno Sánchez (2017)

Personal information
- Born: 18 November 1993 (age 32)

Cycling career
- Sport: Cycling
- Discipline: Track
- Role: Rider

José Moreno Sánchez (born 18 November 1993) is a Spanish professional racing cyclist. He rode at the 2015 UCI Track Cycling World Championships.
