= 2013 UEC European Track Championships – Men's team sprint =

Men's team sprint at the 2013 UEC European Track Championships
- UEC European Champion jersey
- Venue: Omnisport Apeldoorn, Apeldoorn
- Date: 18 October
- Competitors: 36 from 12 nations
- Winning time: 43.636

Medalists
gold medal	René Enders; Robert Förstemann; Maximilian Levy	Germany
silver medal	Grégory Baugé; Michaël D'Almeida; François Pervis	France
bronze medal	Denis Dmitriev; Andrey Kubeev; Pavel Yakushevskiy	Russia

The Men's team sprint at the 2013 UEC European Track Championships was held on 18 October 2013. 12 nations participated.

== Results ==
=== Qualifying ===
The fastest two teams progressed to the gold medal final; the following two progressed to the bronze medal final.

Rank	Name	Nation	Time	Notes
1/2	René Enders; Robert Förstemann; Maximilian Levy	Germany	?	Q
1/2	Grégory Baugé; Michaël D'Almeida; François Pervis	France	?	Q
3/4	Denis Dmitriev; Andrey Kubeev; Pavel Yakushevskiy	Russia	?	q
3/4	Kian Emadi; Philip Hindes; Jason Kenny	Great Britain	?	q
5	Grzegorz Drejgier; Kamil Kuczyński; Krzysztof Maksel	Poland	44.774	
6	Hodei Mazquiarán Uría; José Moreno Sánchez; Juan Peralta	Spain	44.794	
7	Matthijs Büchli; Hugo Haak; Jeffrey Hoogland	Netherlands	44.807	
8	Tomáš Bábek; Pavel Kelemen; Adam Ptáčník	Czech Republic	45.457	
9	Christos Volikakis; Ioannis Kalogeropoulos; Zafeiris Volikakis	Greece	45.543	
10	Uladzislau Novik; Yauhen Veramchuk; Artsiom Zaitsau	Belarus	46.482	
11	Gennadii Genus; Andrii Sach; Andriy Vynokurov	Ukraine	46.540	
12	Dominykas Bikinas; Svajūnas Jonauskas; Arūnas Lendel	Lithuania	49.136	

=== Finals ===
Final rankings were determined in the medal races.

Rank	Name	Nation	Time	Notes
1st place, gold medalist(s)	René Enders; Robert Förstemann; Maximilian Levy	Germany	43.636	
2nd place, silver medalist(s)	Grégory Baugé; Michaël D'Almeida; François Pervis	France	43.902	
3rd place, bronze medalist(s)	Denis Dmitriev; Andrey Kubeev; Pavel Yakushevskiy	Russia	44.537	
4	Kian Emadi; Philip Hindes; Jason Kenny	Great Britain	44.670	
