= 2018 UCI Track Cycling World Championships – Men's team sprint =

Men's team sprint at the 2018 UCI Track Cycling World Championships
- Venue: Omnisport Apeldoorn
- Location: Apeldoorn, Netherlands
- Dates: 28 February
- Competitors: 44 from 13 nations
- Teams: 13
- Winning time: 42.727

Medalists
gold medal	Nils van 't Hoenderdaal; Harrie Lavreysen; Jeffrey Hoogland; Matthijs Büchli	Netherlands
silver medal	Jack Carlin; Ryan Owens; Jason Kenny; Philip Hindes; Joseph Truman	Great Britain
bronze medal	François Pervis; Sébastien Vigier; Quentin Lafargue; Michaël D'Almeida	France

The men's team sprint competition at the 2018 UCI Track Cycling World Championships was held on 28 February 2018 at the Omnisport Apeldoorn in Apeldoorn, Netherlands.

== Results ==
=== Qualifying ===
The eight fastest teams advance to the first round.

Rank	Nation	Time	Behind	Notes
1	Netherlands; Nils van 't Hoenderdaal; Harrie Lavreysen; Jeffrey Hoogland	42.869		Q
2	France; François Pervis; Sébastien Vigier; Quentin Lafargue	43.389	+0.520	Q
3	Germany; Robert Förstemann; Maximilian Levy; Joachim Eilers	43.452	+0.583	Q
4	Great Britain; Jack Carlin; Ryan Owens; Joseph Truman	43.553	+0.684	Q
5	New Zealand; Ethan Mitchell; Sam Webster; Eddie Dawkins	43.736	+0.867	Q
6	Russia; Alexander Sharapov; Pavel Yakushevskiy; Aleksandr Dubchenko	43.905	+1.036	Q
7	Japan; Kazuki Amagai; Yudai Nitta; Kazunari Watanabe	44.240	+1.371	Q
8	Czech Republic; Pavel Kelemen; Martin Čechman; Robin Wagner	44.410	+1.541	Q
9	China; Li Jianxin; Luo Yongjia; Bi Wenjun	44.524	+1.655	
10	Spain; Alejandro Martínez; Juan Peralta; José Moreno Sánchez	44.665	+1.796	
11	Colombia; Kevin Quintero; Rubén Murillo; Santiago Ramírez	45.137	+2.268	
12	Belarus; Yauhen Veramchuk; Artsiom Zaitsau; Uladzislau Novik	45.227	+2.358	
13	Poland; Rafał Sarnecki; Mateusz Rudyk; Krzysztof Maksel	REL^{[A]} ~~43.505~~		

- ^{^{A}} Poland were relegated "for incorrect change" (Art 3.2.153)

=== First round ===
First round heats were held as follows:
Heat 1: 4th v 5th fastest
Heat 2: 3rd v 6th fastest
Heat 3: 2nd v 7th fastest
Heat 4: 1st v 8th fastest

The heat winners were ranked on time, from which the top 2 proceed to the gold medal final and the other 2 proceed to the bronze medal final.

Rank	Overall rank	Name	Nation	Time	Behind	Notes
4 vs 5
1	2	Jack Carlin; Philip Hindes; Jason Kenny	Great Britain	43.434		QG
2	6	Ethan Mitchell; Sam Webster; Eddie Dawkins	New Zealand	44.146	+0.712	
3 vs 6
1	3	Alexander Sharapov; Pavel Yakushevskiy; Aleksandr Dubchenko	Russia	43.557		QB
2	5	Stefan Bötticher; Maximilian Levy; Joachim Eilers	Germany	43.594	+0.037	
2 vs 7
1	4	François Pervis; Sébastien Vigier; Michaël D'Almeida	France	43.737		QB
2	8	Kazuki Amagai; Yudai Nitta; Kazunari Watanabe	Japan	REL^{[B]}		
1 vs 8
1	1	Nils van 't Hoenderdaal; Harrie Lavreysen; Matthijs Büchli	Netherlands	43.234		QG
2	7	Pavel Kelemen; Martin Čechman; Robin Wagner	Czech Republic	44.559	+1.325	

- QG = qualified for gold medal final
- QB = qualified for bronze medal final
- ^{^{B}} Japan were relegated "for two false start[s]" (Art 3.2.155)

=== Finals ===
The final was started at 20:36.

Rank	Name	Nation	Time	Behind	Notes
Gold medal race
1st place, gold medalist(s)	Nils van 't Hoenderdaal; Harrie Lavreysen; Jeffrey Hoogland	Netherlands	42.727		CR
2nd place, silver medalist(s)	Jack Carlin; Ryan Owens; Jason Kenny	Great Britain	43.231	+0.504	
Bronze medal race
3rd place, bronze medalist(s)	François Pervis; Sébastien Vigier; Quentin Lafargue	France	43.373		
4	Alexander Sharapov; Pavel Yakushevskiy; Aleksandr Dubchenko	Russia	43.584	+0.211	
