= UCI Track Cycling World Ranking =

Bicycle racing ranking system

The UCI Track Cycling World Ranking is a track cycling ranking system based upon the results in all men's and women's UCI-sanctioned races over a twelve-month period. The ranking includes an individual and a nations ranking and includes the disciplines: individual pursuit, points race, scratch, sprint, time trial, keirin, omnium (since 2010–11), team pursuit, team sprint and madison. The madison ranking was only for male riders until 2016–17. In 2021 and 2022 there was also an elimination race ranking. Since 2022, in addition to the individual and nations rankings, there has also been a team ranking.

== 2008–2009 ==
Discipline	Men's Ranking		Women's Ranking	
Discipline	Top-ranked individual	Top-ranked nation	Top-ranked individual	Top-ranked nation
Individual pursuit	Vitaliy Shchedov (UKR)	Russia	Vilija Sereikaitė (LTU)	Great Britain
Points race	Chris Newton (GBR)	Australia	Giorgia Bronzini (ITA)	Italy
Scratch	Morgan Kneisky (FRA)	Australia	Elizabeth Armitstead (GBR)	Great Britain
Sprint	Kévin Sireau (FRA)	France	Victoria Pendleton (GBR)	Great Britain
Time trial	Michaël D'Almeida (FRA)	France	Simona Krupeckaitė (LTU)	China
Keirin	Azizulhasni Awang (MAS)	France	Willy Kanis (NED)	China
Team pursuit	Jens-Erik Madsen (DEN)	Denmark	Elizabeth Armitstead (GBR)	Great Britain
Team sprint	Kévin Sireau (FRA)	France	Kaarle McCulloch (AUS)	Australia
Madison	Kenny De Ketele (BEL)	Belgium	—N/a	

== 2009–2010 ==
Discipline	Men's Ranking		Women's Ranking	
Discipline	Top-ranked individual	Top-ranked nation	Top-ranked individual	Top-ranked nation
Individual pursuit	Vitaliy Shchedov (UKR)	Ukraine	Vilija Sereikaitė (LTU)	Lithuania
Points race	Cameron Meyer (AUS)	Australia	Giorgia Bronzini (ITA)	Italy
Scratch	Lukasz Bujko (POL)	New Zealand	Evgenia Romanyuta (RUS)	Russia
Sprint	Kévin Sireau (FRA)	France	Shuang Guo (CHN)	Australia
Time trial	Michaël D'Almeida (FRA)	France	Anna Meares (AUS)	Australia
Keirin	Maximilian Levy (GER)	Germany	Simona Krupeckaitė (LTU)	Australia
Team pursuit	Michael Hepburn (AUS)	Australia	Josephine Tomic (AUS)	Australia
Team sprint	Robert Förstemann (GER)	Germany	Anna Meares (AUS)	Australia
Madison	Angelo Ciccone (ITA)	Germany	—N/a	

== 2010–2011 ==
Discipline	Men's Ranking		Women's Ranking	
Discipline	Top-ranked individual	Top-ranked nation	Top-ranked individual	Top-ranked nation
Individual pursuit	Jack Bobridge (AUS)	Australia	Sarah Hammer (USA)	New Zealand
Points race	Edwin Ávila (COL)	Russia	Giorgia Bronzini (ITA)	Belarus
Scratch	Martin Bláha (CZE)	Czech Republic	Marianne Vos (NED)	Australia
Sprint	Kévin Sireau (FRA)	Great Britain	Anna Meares (AUS)	Australia
Time trial	Stefan Nimke (GER)	France	Lee Wai Sze (HKG)	France
Keirin	Azizulhasni Awang (MAS)	Australia	Anna Meares (AUS)	France
Omnium	Shane Archbold (NZL)	New Zealand	Tara Whitten (CAN)	United States
Team pursuit	Alexei Markov (RUS)	Russia	Wendy Houvenaghel (GBR)	New Zealand
Team sprint	Kévin Sireau (FRA)	France	Jinjie Gong (CHN)	China
Madison	Cameron Meyer (AUS)	Australia	—N/a	

== 2011–2012 ==
Discipline	Men's Ranking		Women's Ranking	
Discipline	Top-ranked individual	Top-ranked nation	Top-ranked individual	Top-ranked nation
Individual pursuit	Peter Latham (NZL)	Australia	Alison Shanks (NZL)	New Zealand
Points race	Unai Elorriaga Zubiaur (ESP)	Spain	Katarzyna Pawłowska (POL)	Italy
Scratch	Ángel Dario Colla (ARG)	Czech Republic	Katarzyna Pawłowska (POL)	Australia
Sprint	Robert Förstemann (GER)	Germany	Lee Wai Sze (HKG)	China
Time trial	Stefan Nimke (GER)	France	Lisandra Guerra Rodriguez (CUB)	Australia
Keirin	Chris Hoy (GBR)	Germany	Simona Krupeckaitė (LTU)	Russia
Omnium	Bryan Coquard (FRA)	Australia	Huang Li (CHN)	Great Britain
Team pursuit	Evgeni Kovalev (RUS)	Australia	Laura Trott (GBR)	Great Britain
Team sprint	Robert Förstemann (GER)	Germany	Miriam Welte (GER)	Germany
Madison	Kenny De Ketele (BEL)	Switzerland	—N/a	

== 2012–2013 ==
Discipline	Men's Ranking		Women's Ranking	
Discipline	Top-ranked individual	Top-ranked nation	Top-ranked individual	Top-ranked nation
Individual pursuit	Michael Hepburn (AUS)	Australia	Sarah Hammer (USA)	Australia
Points race	Andreas Graf (AUS)	Czech Republic	Jarmila Machačová (CZE)	Czech Republic
Scratch	Martyn Irvine (IRL)	Switzerland	Jarmila Machačová (CZE)	Australia
Sprint	Denis Dmitriev (RUS)	Germany	Becky James (GBR)	Great Britain
Time trial	François Pervis (FRA)	France	Lee Wai Sze (HKG)	Russia
Keirin	Maximilian Levy (GER)	Germany	Lee Wai Sze (HKG)	France
Omnium	Lasse Norman Hansen (DEN)	France	Sarah Hammer (USA)	United States
Team pursuit	Alexander Serov (RUS)	Russia	Dani King (GBR)	Great Britain
Team sprint	René Enders (GER)	Germany	Miriam Welte (GER)	Great Britain
Madison	Vivien Brisse (FRA)	France	—N/a	

== 2013–2014 ==
Discipline	Men's Ranking		Women's Ranking	
Discipline	Top-ranked individual	Top-ranked nation	Top-ranked individual	Top-ranked nation
Individual pursuit	Stefan Küng (SUI)		Joanna Rowsell Shand (GBR)	
Points race	Tom Scully (NZL)		Stephanie Gaumnitz (GER)	
Scratch	Ivan Kovalev (RUS)		Laurie Berthon (FRA)	
Sprint	Matthew Glaetzer (AUS)		Kristina Vogel (GER)	
Time trial	Simon van Velthooven (NZL)		Miriam Welte (GER)	
Keirin	François Pervis (FRA)		Kristina Vogel (GER)	
Omnium	Tim Veldt (NED)		Laura Kenny (GBR)	
Team pursuit		Australia		Great Britain
Team sprint		Germany		Germany
Madison		Spain	—N/a	

== 2014–2015 ==
Discipline	Men's Ranking		Women's Ranking	
Discipline	Top-ranked individual	Top-ranked nation	Top-ranked individual	Top-ranked nation
Individual pursuit	Stefan Küng (SUI)	Australia	Joanna Rowsell Shand (GBR)	
Points race	Eloy Teruel (SPA)	New Zealand	Stephanie Gaumnitz (GER)	Italy
Scratch	Ivan Kovalev (RUS)	Germany	Kelly Druyts (BEL)	Italy
Sprint	Jeffrey Hoogland (NED)		Kristina Vogel (GER)	
Time trial	Joachim Eilers (GER)		Anastasia Voynova (RUS)	
Keirin	Fabián Puerta (COL)		Anna Meares (AUS)	
Omnium	Fernando Gaviria (COL)		Laura Kenny (GBR)	
Team pursuit		Australia		Great Britain
Team sprint		France		China
Madison		Spain	—N/a	

== 2015–2016 ==
Discipline	Men's Ranking		Women's Ranking	
Discipline	Top-ranked individual	Top-ranked nation	Top-ranked individual	Top-ranked nation
Individual pursuit	Domenic Weinstein (GER)	Great Britain	Élise Delzenne (FRA)	
Points race	Benjamin Thomas (FRA)	Great Britain	Katarzyna Pawłowska (POL)	Poland
Scratch	Sebastián Mora (SPA)	Switzerland	Laura Kenny (GBR)	Great Britain
Sprint	Matthew Glaetzer (AUS)		Zhong Tianshi (CHN)	
Time trial	Joachim Eilers (GER)	Germany	Anastasia Voynova (RUS)	Russia
Keirin	Joachim Eilers (GER)		Kristina Vogel (GER)	
Omnium	Lasse Norman Hansen (DEN)		Laura Kenny (GBR)	
Team pursuit		Australia		Canada
Team sprint		Germany		China
Madison		Spain	—N/a	

== 2016–2017 ==
Discipline	Men's Ranking		Women's Ranking	
Discipline	Top-ranked individual	Top-ranked nation	Top-ranked individual	Top-ranked nation
Individual pursuit	Daniel Staniszewski (POL)	France	Ashlee Ankudinoff (AUS)	
Points race	Wojciech Pszczolarski (POL)	Great Britain	Elinor Barker (GBR)	Great Britain
Scratch	Adrian Tekliński (POL)	Switzerland	Rachele Barbieri (ITA)	Italy
Sprint	Denis Dmitriev (RUS)	Russia	Kristina Vogel (GER)	Germany
Time trial	Tomáš Bábek (CZE)	France	Lee Wai Sze (HKG)	Russia
Keirin	Fabián Puerta (COL)	Czech Republic	Nicky Degrendele (BEL)	Russia
Omnium	Szymon Sajnok (POL)	France	Lotte Kopecky (BEL)	Great Britain
Team pursuit		Great Britain		Italy
Team sprint		New Zealand		Russia
Madison		Belgium		Great Britain

== 2017–2018 ==
Discipline	Men's ranking		Women's ranking	
Discipline	Top-ranked individual	Top-ranked nation	Top-ranked individual	Top-ranked nation
Individual pursuit	Ivo Oliveira (POR)	Australia	Justyna Kaczkowska (POL)	Great Britain
Points race	Niklas Larsen (DEN)	Poland	Kirsten Wild (NED)	United States
Scratch	Yauheni Karaliok (BLR)	Netherlands	Rachele Barbieri (ITA)	Great Britain
Sprint	Matthew Glaetzer (AUS)	Netherlands	Kristina Vogel (GER)	Germany
Time trial	Jeffrey Hoogland (NED)	Netherlands	Miriam Welte (GER)	Germany
Keirin	Andrii Vynokurov (UKR)	Japan	Kristina Vogel (GER)	Netherlands
Omnium	Szymon Sajnok (POL)	Poland	Kirsten Wild (NED)	Great Britain
Team pursuit		Great Britain		Italy
Team sprint		Germany		China
Madison		Belgium		Great Britain

== 2018–2019 ==
Discipline	Men's ranking		Women's ranking	
Discipline	Top-ranked individual	Top-ranked nation	Top-ranked individual	Top-ranked nation
Individual pursuit	Ivo Oliveira (POR)	Switzerland	Lisa Brennauer (GER)	Germany
Points race	Wojciech Pszczolarski (POL)	Poland	Maria Giulia Confalonieri (ITA)	Italy
Scratch	Christos Volikakis (GRE)	Greece	Olivija Baleišytė (LTU)	Spain
Sprint	Harrie Lavreysen (NED)	Netherlands	Lee Wai Sze (HKG)	Australia
Time trial	Quentin Lafargue (FRA)	Netherlands	Olena Starikova (UKR)	Russia
Keirin	Yudai Nitta (JPN)	Japan	Lee Wai Sze (HKG)	Russia
Omnium	Benjamin Thomas (FRA)	Australia	Kirsten Wild (NED)	Netherlands
Team pursuit		Great Britain		Great Britain
Team sprint		Netherlands		China
Madison	Casper Folsach (DEN)	Denmark	Julie Leth (DEN)	Italy

== 2019–2020 ==
Discipline	Men's ranking		Women's ranking	
Discipline	Top-ranked individual	Top-ranked nation	Top-ranked individual	Top-ranked nation
Individual pursuit	Ashton Lambie (USA)	Italy	Franziska Brauße (GER)	Germany
Points race	Corbin Strong (NZL)	Belarus	Jennifer Valente (USA)	United States
Scratch	Yauheni Karaliok (BLR)	Belarus	Maria Martins (POR)	Great Britain
Sprint	Harrie Lavreysen (NED)	Netherlands	Lee Wai Sze (HKG)	Germany
Time trial	Sam Ligtlee (NED)	France	Lea Friedrich (GER)	Russia
Keirin	Harrie Lavreysen (NED)	Netherlands	Lee Hye-jin (KOR)	New Zealand
Omnium	Jan-Willem van Schip (NED)	Netherlands	Yumi Kajihara (JPN)	Poland
Team pursuit		Italy		United States
Team sprint		Netherlands		Russia
Madison	Yoeri Havik (NED)	Netherlands	Kirsten Wild (NED)	China

== 2021 ==
Discipline	Men's ranking		Women's ranking	
Discipline	Top-ranked individual	Top-ranked nation	Top-ranked individual	Top-ranked nation
Individual pursuit	Claudio Imhof (SUI)	Italy	Kelly Murphy (IRL)	Germany
Points race	Kenny De Ketele (BEL)	Italy	Jarmila Machačová (CZE)	Italy
Scratch	Yauheni Karaliok (BLR)	Italy	Martina Fidanza (ITA)	Italy
Elimination	Yacine Chalel (ALG)	Switzerland	Nikol Plosaj (POL)	Poland
Sprint	Harrie Lavreysen (NED)	Germany	Anastasiia Voinova (RUS)	Germany
Time trial	Santiago Ramírez (COL)	Germany	Miriam Vece (ITA)	Russia
Keirin	Kevin Quintero (COL)	Colombia	Martha Bayona (COL)	Germany
Omnium	Benjamin Thomas (FRA)	Italy	Yumi Kajihara (JPN)	Poland
Team pursuit		Denmark		Germany
Team sprint		Russia		Germany
Madison	Kenny De Ketele (BEL)	Belgium	Daria Pikulik (POL)	Russia

== 2022 ==
Discipline	Men's ranking		Women's ranking	
Discipline	Top-ranked individual	Top-ranked nation	Top-ranked individual	Top-ranked nation
Individual pursuit	Nicolas Heinrich (GER)	Italy	Mieke Kröger (GER)	Germany
Points race	Benjamin Thomas (FRA)	Netherlands	Lotte Kopecky (BEL)	Italy
Scratch	Roy Eefting-Bloem (NED)	Netherlands	Anita Stenberg (NOR)	Italy
Elimination	Jules Hesters (BEL)	Italy	Michelle Andres (SUI)	Italy
Sprint	Harrie Lavreysen (NED)	Netherlands	Emma Hinze (GER)	Germany
Time trial	Alejandro Martínez (ESP)	Germany	Martha Bayona (COL)	Germany
Keirin	Harrie Lavreysen (NED)	Germany	Lea Friedrich (GER)	Canada
Omnium	Fabio Van den Bossche (BEL)	Great Britain	Lotte Kopecky (BEL)	Italy
Team pursuit		France		Germany
Team sprint		Netherlands		Germany
Madison	Michele Scartezzini (ITA)	Belgium	Amalie Dideriksen (DEN)	France

== 2023 ==
Discipline	Men's ranking		Women's ranking	
Discipline	Top-ranked individual	Top-ranked nation	Top-ranked individual	Top-ranked nation
Individual pursuit	Dan Bigham (GBR)	Italy	Franziska Brausse (GER)	Germany
Points race	William Perrett (GBR)	Italy	Marit Raaijmakers (NED)	Great Britain
Scratch	Roy Eefting-Bloem (NED)	Great Britain	Martina Fidanza (ITA)	United States
Sprint	Mateusz Rudyk (POL)	Australia	Emma Finucane (GBR)	Great Britain
Time trial	Jeffrey Hoogland (NED)	Australia	Emma Hinze (GER)	Germany
Keirin	Matthew Richardson (AUS)	Australia	Ellesse Andrews (NZL)	Germany
Omnium	Iúri Leitão (POR)	France	Katie Archibald (GBR)	Great Britain
Team pursuit		Italy		Great Britain
Team sprint		Netherlands		Great Britain
Madison	Yoeri Havik (NED)	Netherlands	Wiktoria Pikulik (POL)	Great Britain

== 2024 ==
Discipline	Men's ranking		Women's ranking	
Discipline	Top-ranked individual	Top-ranked nation	Top-ranked individual	Top-ranked nation
Individual pursuit	Noah Vandenbranden (BEL)	Italy	Federica Venturelli (ITA)	Great Britain
Points race	Sebastián Mora (ESP)	Denmark	Lotte Kopecky (BEL)	Belgium
Scratch	Tobias Hansen (DEN)	Poland	Olivija Baleišytė (LTU)	Italy
Sprint	Harrie Lavreysen (NED)	Netherlands	Emma Finucane (GBR)	Great Britain
Time trial	Santiago Ramírez (COL)	Netherlands	Katy Marchant (GBR)	Great Britain
Keirin	Harrie Lavreysen (NED)	Japan	Emma Finucane (GBR)	Great Britain
Omnium	Ethan Hayter (GBR)	Great Britain	Ally Wollaston (NZL)	Great Britain
Team pursuit		Great Britain		Great Britain
Team sprint		Netherlands		Great Britain
Madison	Roger Kluge (GER)	Germany	Vittoria Guazzini (ITA)	Great Britain

== See also ==
- UCI Women's Road World Rankings (1994–2017)
- UCI Road World Rankings (1984–2004)
