= 2018 UCI Track Cycling World Championships – Men's 1 km time trial =

Men's 1 km time trial at the 2018 UCI Track Cycling World Championships
- Venue: Omnisport Apeldoorn
- Location: Apeldoorn, Netherlands
- Dates: 4 March
- Competitors: 23 from 15 nations
- Winning time: 59.459

Medalists
gold medal	Jeffrey Hoogland	Netherlands
silver medal	Matthew Glaetzer	Australia
bronze medal	Theo Bos	Netherlands

The Men's 1 km time trial competition at the 2018 UCI Track Cycling World Championships was held on 4 March 2018.

== Results ==
=== Qualifying ===
The top 8 riders qualified for the final.

Rank	Name	Nation	Time	Behind	Notes
1	Jeffrey Hoogland	Netherlands	59.517		Q
2	Matthew Glaetzer	Australia	59.733	+0.216	Q
3	Theo Bos	Netherlands	59.798	+0.281	Q
4	Quentin Lafargue	France	1:00.403	+0.886	Q
5	Eric Engler	Germany	1:00.420	+0.903	Q
6	Fabián Puerta	Colombia	1:00.609	+1.092	Q
7	Michaël D'Almeida	France	1:00.687	+1.170	Q
8	Sam Ligtlee	Netherlands	1:00.736	+1.219	Q
9	Callum Skinner	Great Britain	1:00.778	+1.261	
10	François Pervis	France	1:00.952	+1.435	
11	Alexandr Vasyukhno	Russia	1:01.206	+1.689	
12	Joseph Truman	Great Britain	1:01.464	+1.947	
13	Dylan Kennett	New Zealand	1:01.474	+1.957	
14	Robin Wagner	Czech Republic	1:01.586	+2.069	
15	Pavel Kelemen	Czech Republic	1:01.723	+2.206	
16	Stefan Ritter	Canada	1:01.923	+2.406	
17	Mateusz Lipa	Poland	1:01.956	+2.439	
18	José Moreno Sánchez	Spain	1:01.957	+2.440	
19	Mateusz Rudyk	Poland	1:02.159	+2.642	
20	Bradly Knipe	New Zealand	1:02.291	+2.774	
21	Tomohiro Fukaya	Japan	1:02.516	+2.999	
22	Hsiao Shih-hsin	Chinese Taipei	1:03.007	+3.490	
23	Jean Spies	South Africa	1:04.681	+5.164	
–	Joachim Eilers	Germany	DNS		

=== Final ===
The final was held at 14:16.

Rank	Name	Nation	Time	Behind	Notes
1st place, gold medalist(s)	Jeffrey Hoogland	Netherlands	59.459		
2nd place, silver medalist(s)	Matthew Glaetzer	Australia	59.745	+0.286	
3rd place, bronze medalist(s)	Theo Bos	Netherlands	59.955	+0.496	
4	Quentin Lafargue	France	1:00.407	+0.948	
5	Eric Engler	Germany	1:00.462	+1.003	
6	Michaël D'Almeida	France	1:00.518	+1.059	
7	Fabián Puerta	Colombia	1:00.800	+1.341	
8	Sam Ligtlee	Netherlands	1:01.421	+1.962	
