= 2019 UCI Track Cycling World Championships – Men's team sprint =

Men's team sprint at the 2019 UCI Track Cycling World Championships
- Venue: BGŻ Arena
- Location: Pruszków, Poland
- Dates: 27 February
- Competitors: 52 from 16 nations
- Teams: 16
- Winning time: 41.923

Medalists
gold medal	Roy van den Berg; Harrie Lavreysen; Matthijs Büchli; Jeffrey Hoogland	Netherlands
silver medal	Grégory Baugé; Sébastien Vigier; Quentin Lafargue; Michaël D'Almeida	France
bronze medal	Denis Dmitriev; Alexander Sharapov; Pavel Yakushevskiy	Russia

The Men's team sprint competition at the 2019 UCI Track Cycling World Championships was held on 27 February 2019.

== Results ==
=== Qualifying ===
The qualifying was started at 18:47. The fastest eight teams qualified for the first round.

Rank	Nation	Time	Behind	Notes
1	Netherlands; Roy van den Berg; Harrie Lavreysen; Jeffrey Hoogland	42.574		Q
2	France; Grégory Baugé; Sébastien Vigier; Quentin Lafargue	43.358	+0.784	Q
3	New Zealand; Ethan Mitchell; Sam Webster; Eddie Dawkins	43.388	+1.016	Q
4	Poland; Rafał Sarnecki; Mateusz Rudyk; Krzysztof Maksel	43.475	+1.032	Q
5	Germany; Timo Bichler; Stefan Bötticher; Maximilian Dörnbach	43.590	+1.054	Q
6	Russia; Alexander Sharapov; Denis Dmitriev; Pavel Yakushevskiy	43.606	+0.814	Q
7	Australia; Matthew Richardson; Nathan Hart; Patrick Constable	43.628	+0.901	Q
8	Great Britain; Ryan Owens; Philip Hindes; Jason Kenny	43.704	+1.130	Q
9	China; Guo Shuai; Xu Chao; Zhou Yu	44.159	+1.585	
10	Japan; Kazuki Amagai; Yudai Nitta; Tomohiro Fukaya	44.260	+1.686	
11	Trinidad and Tobago; Njisane Phillip; Keron Bramble; Nicholas Paul	44.397	+1.823	
12	Czech Republic; Pavel Kelemen; Tomáš Bábek; Robin Wagner	44.424	+1.850	
13	Spain; Alejandro Martínez; Juan Peralta; José Moreno Sánchez	44.554	+1.980	
14	Belarus; Yauhen Veramchuk; Artsiom Zaitsau; Uladzislau Novik	44.995	+2.421	
15	Malaysia; Azizulhasni Awang; Muhammad Shah Firdaus Sahrom; Muhammad Fadhil Mohd Zonis	45.099	+2.525	
16	Kazakhstan; Maxim Nalyotov; Sergey Ponomaryov; Pavel Vorzhev	45.388	+2.814	

=== First round ===
The first round was started at 20:06.

First round heats were held as follows:
Heat 1: 4th v 5th fastest
Heat 2: 3rd v 6th fastest
Heat 3: 2nd v 7th fastest
Heat 4: 1st v 8th fastest

The heat winners were ranked on time, from which the top 2 proceeded to the gold medal final and the other 2 proceeded to the bronze medal final.

Rank	Overall rank	Nation	Time	Behind	Notes
4 vs 5
1	3	Germany; Timo Bichler; Stefan Bötticher; Maximilian Dörnbach	43.266		QB
2	7	Poland; Maciej Bielecki; Mateusz Rudyk; Rafał Sarnecki	43.748	+0.482	
3 vs 6
2	6	Russia; Denis Dmitriev; Alexander Sharapov; Pavel Yakushevskiy	43.547		QB
1	8	New Zealand; Eddie Dawkins; Ethan Mitchell; Sam Webster	43.997	+0.450	
2 vs 7
1	2	France; Grégory Baugé; Michaël D'Almeida; Sébastien Vigier	43.086		QG
2	5	Australia; Patrick Constable; Nathan Hart; Matthew Richardson	43.518	+0.432	
1 vs 8
1	1	Netherlands; Matthijs Büchli; Harrie Lavreysen; Roy van den Berg	42.436		QG
2	4	Great Britain; Jack Carlin; Jason Kenny; Ryan Owens	43.330	+0.894	

- QG = qualified for gold medal final
- QB = qualified for bronze medal final

=== Finals ===
The finals were started at 21:01.

Rank	Nation	Time	Behind	Notes
Gold medal race
1st place, gold medalist(s)	Netherlands; Roy van den Berg; Harrie Lavreysen; Jeffrey Hoogland	41.923		
2nd place, silver medalist(s)	France; Grégory Baugé; Sébastien Vigier; Quentin Lafargue	42.889	+0.933	
Bronze medal race
3rd place, bronze medalist(s)	Russia; Alexander Sharapov; Denis Dmitriev; Pavel Yakushevskiy	43.115		
4	Germany; Timo Bichler; Stefan Bötticher; Maximilian Dörnbach	43.294	+0.174	
