= 2018 UEC European Track Championships – Men's team sprint =

Men's team sprint at the 2018 UEC European Track Championships
- Venue: Sir Chris Hoy Velodrome, Glasgow
- Date: 3 August
- Competitors: 35 from 10 nations
- Winning time: 42.888

Medalists
gold medal	Jeffrey Hoogland; Harrie Lavreysen; Roy van den Berg; Nils van 't Hoenderdaal	Netherlands
silver medal	Sébastien Vigier; François Pervis; Quentin Lafargue; Michaël D'Almeida	France
bronze medal	Stefan Bötticher; Joachim Eilers; Timo Bichler	Germany

The men's team sprint competition at the 2018 UEC European Track Championships was held on 3 August 2018.

== Results ==
=== Qualifying ===
The eight fastest teams advanced to the first round.

Rank	Name	Nation	Time	Behind	Notes
1	Jeffrey Hoogland; Harrie Lavreysen; Roy van den Berg	Netherlands	42.905		Q
2	Stefan Bötticher; Timo Bichler; Joachim Eilers	Germany	43.429	+0.524	Q
3	Jack Carlin; Jason Kenny; Ryan Owens	Great Britain	43.454	+0.549	Q
4	Sébastien Vigier; Michaël D'Almeida; François Pervis	France	43.527	+0.622	Q
5	Denis Dmitriev; Pavel Yakushevskiy; Shane Perkins	Russia	43.973	+1.068	Q
6	Rafał Sarnecki; Maciej Bielecki; Krzysztof Maksel	Poland	43.977	+1.072	Q
7	Pavel Kelemen; Tomáš Bábek; David Sojka	Czech Republic	44.493	+1.588	Q
8	Artsiom Zaitsau; Uladzislau Novik; Yauhen Veramchuk	Belarus	44.754	+1.849	Q
9	José Moreno Sánchez; Juan Peralta; Alejandro Martínez	Spain	46.057	+3.152	
10	Luca Ceci; Davide Ceci; Francesco Ceci	Italy	46.228	+3.323	

=== First round ===
First round heats were held as follows:
Heat 1: 4th v 5th fastest
Heat 2: 3rd v 6th fastest
Heat 3: 2nd v 7th fastest
Heat 4: 1st v 8th fastest

The heat winners were ranked on time, from which the top 2 proceeded to the gold medal final and the other 2 proceeded to the bronze medal final.

Rank	Overall rank	Name	Nation	Time	Behind	Notes
1 vs 8
1	1	Jeffrey Hoogland; Harrie Lavreysen; Nils van 't Hoenderdaal	Netherlands	42.811		QG
2	8	Artsiom Zaitsau; Uladzislau Novik; Yauhen Veramchuk	Belarus	44.692	+1.881	
2 vs 7
1	3	Stefan Bötticher; Timo Bichler; Joachim Eilers	Germany	43.585		QB
2	7	Pavel Kelemen; Tomáš Bábek; Robin Wagner	Czech Republic	44.292	+0.707	
3 vs 6
2	6	Philip Hindes; Jason Kenny; Ryan Owens	Great Britain	44.063	+0.137	
1	4	Mateusz Lipa; Rafał Sarnecki; Maciej Bielecki	Poland	43.926		QB
4 vs 5
1	2	Sébastien Vigier; Quentin Lafargue; François Pervis	France	43.481		QG
2	5	Denis Dmitriev; Pavel Yakushevskiy; Shane Perkins	Russia	43.865	+0.384	

- QG = qualified for gold medal final
- QB = qualified for bronze medal final

=== Finals ===
Rank	Name	Nation	Time	Behind	Notes
Gold medal final
1st place, gold medalist(s)	Jeffrey Hoogland; Harrie Lavreysen; Roy van den Berg	Netherlands	42.888		
2nd place, silver medalist(s)	Sébastien Vigier; François Pervis; Quentin Lafargue	France	43.693	+0.805	
Bronze medal final
3rd place, bronze medalist(s)	Stefan Bötticher; Joachim Eilers; Timo Bichler	Germany	43.805		
4	Mateusz Lipa; Maciej Bielecki; Krzysztof Maksel	Poland	44.065	+0.260	
