= 2015 UEC European Track Championships – Men's sprint =

Men's sprint at the 2015 UEC European Track Championships
- UEC European Champion jersey
- Venue: Velodrome Suisse, Grenchen
- Date: 16 October
- Competitors: 31 from 19 nations

Medalists
gold medal	Jeffrey Hoogland	Netherlands
silver medal	Max Niederlag	Germany
bronze medal	Damian Zieliński	Poland

The Men's sprint was held on 16 October 2015.

== Results ==
=== Qualifying ===
The top 18 qualify for the match rounds.

Rank	Name	Nation	100m	Time (200m)	Speed (km/h)
1	Jeffrey Hoogland	Netherlands	4.816 (1)	9.698	74.242
2	Pavel Kelemen	Czech Republic	4.877 (3)	9.855	73.059
3	Max Niederlag	Germany	4.871 (2)	9.861	73.014
4	Damian Zieliński	Poland	4.897 (5)	9.863	73.000
5	Denis Dmitriev	Russia	4.895 (4)	9.871	72.940
6	Hugo Haak	Netherlands	4.921 (7)	9.911	72.646
7	Quentin Lafargue	France	4.925 (9)	9.915	72.617
8	Lewis Oliva	United Kingdom	4.928 (11)	9.927	72.529
9	Nikita Shurshin	Russia	4.918 (6)	9.928	72.522
10	François Pervis	France	4.926 (10)	9.942	72.420
11	Jason Kenny	United Kingdom	4.921 (7)	9.966	72.245
12	Rafal Sarnecki	Poland	4.978 (12)	10.052	71.627
13	Andriy Vynokurov	Ukraine	5.001 (14)	10.060	71.570
14	Maximilian Levy	Germany	5.007 (16)	10.062	71.556
15	Adam Ptáčník	Czech Republic	5.001 (14)	10.101	71.280
16	Juan Peralta Gascon	Spain	4.991 (13)	10.118	71.160
17	Sandor Szalontay	Hungary	5.020 (17)	10.222	70.436
18	Eoin Mullen	Ireland	5.027 (18)	10.235	70.346
19	Vasilijus Lendel	Lithuania	5.046 (19)	10.239	70.319
20	Sergio Aliaga Chivite	Spain	5.081 (21)	10.274	70.079
21	Christos Volikakis	Greece	5.078 (20)	10.277	70.059
22	Uladzislau Novik	Belarus	5.108 (22)	10.340	69.632
23	Francesco Ceci	Italy	5.148 (23)	10.409	69.170
24	Zafeiris Volikakis	Greece	5.150 (24)	10.454	68.873
25	Yauhen Veramchuk	Belarus	5.151 (25)	10.462	68.820
26	Sergii Omelchenko	Azerbaijan	5.170 (28)	10.490	68.636
27	Miroslav Minchev	Bulgaria	5.169 (27)	10.494	68.610
28	Svajunas Jonauskas	Lithuania	5.161 (26)	10.573	68.097
29	Davit Askurava	Georgia	5.336 (30)	10.787	66.747
30	Andriy Kutsenko	Ukraine	5.315 (29)	10.797	66.685
31	Jani Mikkonen	Finland	5.358 (31)	10.841	66.414

=== 1/16 Finals ===
Winners proceed directly to the 1/8 finals; losers proceed to the repechage.

Heat	Rank	Name	Nation	Won
1	1	Jeffrey Hoogland	Netherlands	X
1	2	Eoin Mullen	Ireland	
2	1	Pavel Kelemen	Czech Republic	X
2	2	Sandor Szalontay	Hungary	
3	1	Max Niederlag	Germany	X
3	2	Juan Peralta Gascon	Spain	
4	1	Damian Zieliński	Poland	X
4	2	Adam Ptáčník	Czech Republic	
5	1	Denis Dmitriev	Russia	X
5	2	Maximilian Levy	Germany	
6	1	Hugo Haak	Netherlands	X
6	2	Andriy Vynokurov	Ukraine	
7	1	Quentin Lafargue	France	X
7	2	Rafal Sarnecki	Poland	
8	1	Jason Kenny	United Kingdom	X
8	2	Lewis Oliva	United Kingdom	
9	1	Nikita Shurshin	Russia	X
9	2	François Pervis	France	

=== 1/16 Finals Repechages ===
Winners proceed to the 1/8 finals.

Heat	Rank	Name	Nation	Won
1	1	Andriy Vynokurov	Ukraine	X
1	2	Eoin Mullen	Ireland	
1	3	François Pervis	France	
2	1	Rafal Sarnecki	Poland	X
2	2	Maximilian Levy	Germany	
2	3	Sandor Szalontay	Hungary	
3	1	Lewis Oliva	United Kingdom	X
3	2	Juan Peralta Gascon	Spain	
3	3	Adam Ptáčník	Czech Republic	

=== 1/8 Finals ===
Winners proceed directly to the quarter-finals; losers proceed to the repechage.

Heat	Rank	Name	Nation	Won
1	1	Jeffrey Hoogland	Netherlands	X
1	2	Lewis Oliva	United Kingdom	
2	1	Rafal Sarnecki	Poland	X
2	2	Pavel Kelemen	Czech Republic	
3	1	Max Niederlag	Germany	X
3	2	Andriy Vynokurov	Ukraine	
4	1	Damian Zieliński	Poland	X
4	2	Nikita Shurshin	Russia	
5	1	Denis Dmitriev	Russia	X
5	2	Jason Kenny	United Kingdom	
6	1	Hugo Haak	Netherlands	X
6	2	Quentin Lafargue	France	

=== 1/8 Finals Repechages ===
Winners proceed to the quarter-finals; losers proceed to the race for places 9–12.

Heat	Rank	Name	Nation	Won
1	1	Lewis Oliva	United Kingdom	X
1	2	Nikita Shurshin	Russia	
1	3	Quentin Lafargue	France	
2	1	Jason Kenny	United Kingdom	X
2	2	Pavel Kelemen	Czech Republic	
2	3	Andriy Vynokurov	Ukraine	

=== Race for 9th place ===
This ranking final determines the allocation of places 9–12.

Rank	Name	Nation	Won
9	Nikita Shurshin	Russia	X
10	Andriy Vynokurov	Ukraine	
11	Pavel Kelemen	Czech Republic	
12	Quentin Lafargue	France	

=== Quarter-finals ===
One-on-one matches are extended to a 'best of three' format hereon. Winners proceed to the semi-finals; losers proceed to the race for places 5–8.

Heat	Rank	Name	Nation	1st run	2nd run	3rd run
1	1	Jeffrey Hoogland	Netherlands	X	X	
1	2	Jason Kenny	United Kingdom			
2	1	Rafal Sarnecki	Poland	X	X	
2	2	Lewis Oliva	United Kingdom			
3	1	Max Niederlag	Germany		X	X
3	2	Hugo Haak	Netherlands	X		
4	1	Damian Zieliński	Poland		X	X
4	2	Denis Dmitriev	Russia	X	REL	

=== Race for 5th place ===
This ranking final determines the allocation of places 5–8.

Rank	Name	Nation	Won
5	Jason Kenny	United Kingdom	X
6	Denis Dmitriev	Russia	
7	Hugo Haak	Netherlands	
8	Lewis Oliva	United Kingdom	

=== Semi-finals ===
Winners proceed to the gold medal final; losers proceed to the bronze medal final.

Heat	Rank	Name	Nation	1st run	2nd run	3rd run
1	1	Jeffrey Hoogland	Netherlands	X	X	
1	2	Damian Zieliński	Poland			
2	1	Max Niederlag	Germany	X	X	
2	2	Rafal Sarnecki	Poland			

=== Finals ===
The final classification is determined in the medal finals.

Rank	Name	Nation	1st run	2nd run	3rd run
Bronze medal race
3	Damian Zieliński	Poland	X	X	
4	Rafal Sarnecki	Poland			
Gold medal race
1	Jeffrey Hoogland	Netherlands	X	X	
2	Max Niederlag	Germany			
