= 2017 UEC European Track Championships – Men's team sprint =

Men's team sprint at the 2017 UEC European Track Championships
- UEC European Champion jersey
- Venue: Velodrom, Berlin
- Date: 19 October
- Competitors: 33 from 11 nations
- Winning time: 43.254

Medalists
gold medal	Benjamin Edelin; Sébastien Vigier; Quentin Lafargue	France
silver medal	Robert Förstemann; Maximilian Levy; Joachim Eilers	Germany
bronze medal	Jeffrey Hoogland; Harrie Lavreysen; Matthijs Büchli	Netherlands

The Men's team sprint was held on 19 October 2017.

== Results ==
=== Qualifying ===
The fastest 8 teams qualify for the first round.

Rank	Name	Nation	Time	Notes
1	Benjamin Edelin; Sébastien Vigier; Quentin Lafargue	France	43.305	Q
2	Maciej Bielecki; Mateusz Rudyk; Krzysztof Maksel	Poland	43.448	Q
3	Robert Förstemann; Maximilian Levy; Joachim Eilers	Germany	43.573	Q
4	Pavel Yakushevskiy; Shane Perkins; Denis Dmitriev	Russia	43.682	Q
5	Pavel Kelemen; Tomáš Bábek; David Sojka	Czech Republic	43.797	Q
6	Jack Carlin; Ryan Owens; Callum Skinner	Great Britain	43.818	Q
7	Jeffrey Hoogland; Harrie Lavreysen; Matthijs Büchli	Netherlands	43.896	Q
8	Yauhen Veramchuk; Artsiom Zaitsau; Uladzislau Novik	Spain	44.430	Q
9	Volodymyr Buchynyskyy; Andriy Vynokurov; Andriy Kutsenko	Ukraine	44.487	
10	Alejandro Martínez; Juan Peralta; José Moreno Sánchez	Spain	44.976	
11	Norbert Szabó; Alexandru Ciocan; Marius Petrache	Romania	50.079	

=== First round ===
First round heats are held as follows:
Heat 1: 4th v 5th qualifier
Heat 2: 3rd v 6th qualifier
Heat 3: 2nd v 7th qualifier
Heat 4: 1st v 8th qualifier

The heat winners are ranked on time, from which the top 2 proceed to the gold medal final and the other 2 proceed to the bronze medal final.

Rank	Heat	Name	Nation	Time	Notes
1	4	Benjamin Edelin; Sébastien Vigier; Quentin Lafargue	France	43.111	QG
2	2	Robert Förstemann; Maximilian Levy; Joachim Eilers	Germany	43.254	QG
3	3	Jeffrey Hoogland; Harrie Lavreysen; Matthijs Büchli	Netherlands	43.302	QB
4	1	Pavel Yakushevskiy; Shane Perkins; Denis Dmitriev	Russia	43.323	QB
5	1	Pavel Kelemen; Tomáš Bábek; David Sojka	Czech Republic	43.498	
6	2	Jack Carlin; Ryan Owens; Callum Skinner	Great Britain	43.775	
7	3	Maciej Bielecki; Mateusz Rudyk; Krzysztof Maksel	Poland	44.088	
8	4	Yauhen Veramchuk; Artsiom Zaitsau; Uladzislau Novik	Spain	44.178	

- QG = qualified for gold medal final
- QB = qualified for bronze medal final

=== Finals ===
The final classification is determined in the medal finals.

Rank	Name	Nation	Time	Notes
Bronze medal final
3rd place, bronze medalist(s)	Jeffrey Hoogland; Harrie Lavreysen; Matthijs Büchli	Netherlands	43.405	
4	Pavel Yakushevskiy; Shane Perkins; Denis Dmitriev	Russia	43.601	
Gold medal final
1st place, gold medalist(s)	Benjamin Edelin; Sébastien Vigier; Quentin Lafargue	France	43.254	
2nd place, silver medalist(s)	Robert Förstemann; Maximilian Levy; Joachim Eilers	Germany	43.337	
