= 2019 UCI Track Cycling World Championships – Men's sprint =

Men's sprint at the 2019 UCI Track Cycling World Championships
- Venue: BGŻ Arena
- Location: Pruszków, Poland
- Dates: 2–3 March
- Competitors: 34 from 21 nations

Medalists
gold medal	Harrie Lavreysen	Netherlands
silver medal	Jeffrey Hoogland	Netherlands
bronze medal	Mateusz Rudyk	Poland

The Men's sprint competition at the 2019 UCI Track Cycling World Championships was held on 2 and 3 March 2019.

== Results ==
=== Qualifying ===
The qualifying was started on 2 March at 12:30. The top four riders advanced directly to the 1/8 finals; places 5 to 28 advanced to the 1/16 finals.

Rank	Name	Nation	Time	Behind	Notes
1	Jeffrey Hoogland	Netherlands	9.572		Q
2	Harrie Lavreysen	Netherlands	9.584	+0.012	Q
3	Mateusz Rudyk	Poland	9.584	+0.012	Q
4	Sebastien Vigier	France	9.673	+0.101	Q
5	Matthew Glaetzer	Australia	9.706	+0.134	q
6	Denis Dmitriev	Russia	9.730	+0.158	q
7	Nathan Hart	Australia	9.733	+0.161	q
8	Nicholas Paul	Trinidad and Tobago	9.751	+0.179	q
9	Stefan Bötticher	Germany	9.758	+0.186	q
10	Joseph Truman	Great Britain	9.767	+0.195	q
11	Jack Carlin	Great Britain	9.783	+0.211	q
12	Jair Tjon En Fa	Suriname	9.805	+0.233	q
13	Njisane Phillip	Trinidad and Tobago	9.828	+0.256	q
14	Quentin Caleyron	France	9.839	+0.267	q
15	Matthijs Büchli	Netherlands	9.852	+0.280	q
16	Sándor Szalontay	Hungary	9.854	+0.282	q
17	Pavel Kelemen	Czech Republic	9.878	+0.306	q
18	Sam Webster	New Zealand	9.880	+0.308	q
19	Hugo Barrette	Canada	9.884	+0.312	q
20	Ethan Mitchell	New Zealand	9.902	+0.330	q
21	Tomohiro Fukaya	Japan	9.916	+0.344	q
22	Maximilian Dörnbach	Germany	9.917	+0.345	q
23	Pavel Yakushevskiy	Russia	9.920	+0.348	q
24	Xu Chao	China	9.948	+0.376	q
25	Yuta Wakimoto	Japan	9.952	+0.380	q
26	Juan Peralta	Spain	9.970	+0.398	q
27	Vasilijus Lendel	Lithuania	9.977	+0.405	q
28	Kevin Quintero	Colombia	9.990	+0.418	q
29	Joel Archambault	Canada	10.020	+0.448	
30	Azizulhasni Awang	Malaysia	10.022	+0.450	
31	Muhammad Shah Firdaus Sahrom	Malaysia	10.090	+0.518	
32	Jean Spies	South Africa	10.183	+0.611	
33	Maxim Nalyotov	Kazakhstan	10.187	+0.615	
34	Muhammad Fadhil Mohd Zonis	Malaysia	10.242	+0.670	

=== 1/16 finals ===
The 1/16 finals were started on 2 March at 13:39. Heat winners advanced to the 1/8 finals.

Heat	Rank	Name	Nation	Gap	Notes
1	1	Matthew Glaetzer	Australia		Q
1	2	Kevin Quintero	Colombia	+0.091	
2	1	Denis Dmitriev	Russia		Q
2	2	Vasilijus Lendel	Lithuania	+0.139	
3	1	Nathan Hart	Australia		Q
3	2	Juan Peralta	Spain	+0.237	
4	1	Nicholas Paul	Trinidad and Tobago		Q
4	2	Yuta Wakimoto	Japan	+0.098	
5	1	Stefan Bötticher	Germany		Q
5	2	Xu Chao	China	+0.038	
6	1	Joseph Truman	Great Britain		Q
6	2	Pavel Yakushevskiy	Russia	+0.134	
7	1	Jack Carlin	Great Britain		Q
7	2	Maximilian Dörnbach	Germany	+0.058	
8	1	Tomohiro Fukaya	Japan		Q
8	2	Jair Tjon En Fa	Suriname	+0.034	
9	1	Ethan Mitchell	New Zealand		Q
9	2	Njisane Phillip	Trinidad and Tobago	Did not finish	
10	1	Hugo Barrette	Canada		Q
10	2	Quentin Caleyron	France	+0.119	
11	1	Sam Webster	New Zealand		Q
11	2	Matthijs Büchli	Netherlands	+0.053	
12	1	Pavel Kelemen	Czech Republic		Q
12	2	Sándor Szalontay	Hungary	+0.037	

=== 1/8 finals ===
The 1/8 finals were started on 2 March at 15:14. Heat winners advanced to the quarterfinals.

Heat	Rank	Name	Nation	Gap	Notes
1	1	Jeffrey Hoogland	Netherlands		Q
1	2	Pavel Kelemen	Czech Republic	+0.073	
2	1	Harrie Lavreysen	Netherlands		Q
2	2	Sam Webster	New Zealand	+1.445	
3	1	Mateusz Rudyk	Poland		Q
3	2	Hugo Barrette	Canada	+0.099	
4	1	Ethan Mitchell	New Zealand		Q
4	2	Sebastien Vigier	France	+0.007	
5	1	Matthew Glaetzer	Australia		Q
5	2	Tomohiro Fukaya	Japan	+0.090	
6	1	Denis Dmitriev	Russia		Q
6	2	Jack Carlin	Great Britain	+0.018	
7	1	Nathan Hart	Australia		Q
7	2	Joseph Truman	Great Britain	Relegated	
8	1	Nicholas Paul	Trinidad and Tobago		Q
8	2	Stefan Bötticher	Germany	+0.004	

=== Quarterfinals ===
The quarterfinals were started on 2 March at 17:22. Matches were extended to a best-of-three format hereon; winners proceeded to the semifinals.

Heat	Rank	Name	Nation	Race 1	Race 2	Decider (i.r.)	Notes
1	1	Jeffrey Hoogland	Netherlands	X	X		Q
1	2	Nicholas Paul	Trinidad and Tobago	+0.243	+1.180		
2	1	Harrie Lavreysen	Netherlands	X	X		Q
2	2	Nathan Hart	Australia	+0.142	+0.154		
3	1	Mateusz Rudyk	Poland	X	X		Q
3	2	Denis Dmitriev	Russia	+0.260	+1.168		
4	1	Matthew Glaetzer	Australia	X	X		Q
4	2	Ethan Mitchell	New Zealand	+0.024	+0.068		

=== Semifinals ===
The semifinals were started on 3 March at 12:00. Winners proceeded to the final.

Heat	Rank	Name	Nation	Race 1	Race 2	Decider (i.r.)	Notes
1	1	Jeffrey Hoogland	Netherlands	X	X		Q
1	2	Matthew Glaetzer	Australia	+0.016	+0.126		
2	1	Harrie Lavreysen	Netherlands	+0.006	X	X	Q
2	2	Mateusz Rudyk	Poland	X	+0.040	+0.553	

=== Finals ===
The finals were started on 3 March at 14:37.

Rank	Name	Nation	Race 1	Race 2	Decider (i.r.)
Gold medal race
1st place, gold medalist(s)	Harrie Lavreysen	Netherlands	X	X	
2nd place, silver medalist(s)	Jeffrey Hoogland	Netherlands	+0.166	+0.032	
Bronze medal race
3rd place, bronze medalist(s)	Mateusz Rudyk	Poland	X	X	
4	Matthew Glaetzer	Australia	REL	+0.041	
