= 2017 UEC European Track Championships – Men's sprint =

European Track Championship

Men's sprint at the 2017 UEC European Track Championships
- UEC European Champion jersey
- Venue: Velodrom, Berlin
- Date: 20 October
- Competitors: 31 from 19 nations

Medalists
gold medal	Sébastien Vigier	France
silver medal	Jeffrey Hoogland	Netherlands
bronze medal	Denis Dmitriev	Russia

The Men's sprint was held on 20 October 2017.

== Results ==
=== Qualifying ===
The top four riders advanced directly to the 1/8 finals; places 5 to 28 advanced to the 1/16 finals.

Rank	Name	Nation	Time	Notes
1	Sébastien Vigier	France	9.630	Q
2	Harrie Lavreysen	Netherlands	9.707	Q
3	Denis Dmitriev	Russia	9.726	Q
4	Vasilijus Lendel	Lithuania	9.746	Q
5	Andriy Vynokurov	Ukraine	9.769	q
6	Mateusz Rudyk	Poland	9.778	q
7	Jeffrey Hoogland	Netherlands	9.853	q
8	Pavel Yakushevskiy	Russia	9.859	q
9	Maximilian Levy	Germany	9.888	q
10	Martin Čechman	Czech Republic	9.891	q
11	David Sojka	Czech Republic	9.892	q
12	Philip Hindes	Great Britain	9.941	q
13	Kamil Kuczyński	Poland	9.961	q
14	Ryan Owens	Great Britain	9.975	q
15	Svajunas Jonauskas	Lithuania	10.016	q
16	Melvin Landerneau	France	10.041	q
17	Sotirios Bretas	Greece	10.068	q
18	Sandor Szalontay	Hungary	10.068	q
19	Luca Ceci	Italy	10.075	q
20	Eric Engler	Germany	10.090	q
21	José Moreno Sánchez	Spain	10.203	q
22	Juan Peralta	Spain	10.208	q
23	Eoin Mullen	Ireland	10.215	q
24	Andriy Kutsenko	Ukraine	10.238	q
25	Ayrton De Pauw	Belgium	10.268	q
26	Davide Ceci	Italy	10.429	q
27	Artsiom Zaitsau	Belarus	10.560	q
28	Yauhen Veramchuk	Belarus	10.605	q
29	Norbert Szabó	Romania	10.636	
30	Davit Askurava	Georgia	11.006	
31	Sergey Omelchenko	Azerbaijan	11.007	

=== 1/16 Finals ===
Winners proceed to the 1/8 finals.

Heat	Rank	Name	Nation	Time	Notes
1	1	Andriy Vynokurov	Ukraine	10.373	Q
1	2	Yauhen Veramchuk	Belarus		
2	1	Mateusz Rudyk	Poland	10.165	Q
2	2	Artsiom Zaitsau	Belarus		
3	1	Jeffrey Hoogland	Netherlands	10.645	Q
3	2	Davide Ceci	Italy		
4	1	Pavel Yakushevskiy	Russia	10.943	Q
4	2	Ayrton De Pauw	Belgium		
5	1	Maximilian Levy	Germany	10.668	Q
5	2	Andriy Kutsenko	Ukraine		
6	1	Martin Čechman	Czech Republic	10.485	Q
6	2	Eoin Mullen	Ireland		
7	1	David Sojka	Czech Republic	10.635	Q
7	2	Juan Peralta	Spain		
8	1	Philip Hindes	Great Britain	10.502	Q
8	2	José Moreno Sánchez	Spain		
9	1	Kamil Kuczyński	Poland	10.541	Q
9	2	Eric Engler	Germany		
10	1	Ryan Owens	Great Britain	10.562	Q
10	2	Luca Ceci	Italy		
11	1	Svajunas Jonauskas	Lithuania	10.507	Q
11	2	Sandor Szalontay	Hungary		
12	1	Sotirios Bretas	Greece	10.440	Q
12	2	Melvin Landerneau	France		

=== 1/8 Finals ===
Winners proceed to the quarter-finals.

Heat	Rank	Name	Nation	Time	Notes
1	1	Sébastien Vigier	France	10.440	Q
1	2	Sotirios Bretas	Greece		
2	1	Harrie Lavreysen	Netherlands	10.288	Q
2	2	Svajunas Jonauskas	Lithuania		
3	1	Denis Dmitriev	Russia	10.428	Q
3	2	Ryan Owens	Great Britain		
4	1	Vasilijus Lendel	Lithuania	10.424	Q
4	2	Kamil Kuczyński	Poland		
5	1	Andriy Vynokurov	Ukraine	10.271	Q
5	2	Philip Hindes	Great Britain		
6	1	Mateusz Rudyk	Poland	10.464	Q
6	2	David Sojka	Czech Republic		
7	1	Jeffrey Hoogland	Netherlands	10.218	Q
7	2	Martin Čechman	Czech Republic		
8	1	Maximilian Levy	Germany	10.492	Q
8	2	Pavel Yakushevskiy	Russia		

=== Quarter-finals ===
One-on-one matches are extended to a 'best of three' format hereon. Winners proceed to the semi-finals.

Heat	Rank	Name	Nation	Race 1	Race 2	Decider	Notes
1	1	Sébastien Vigier	France	10.340	10.195		Q
1	2	Maximilian Levy	Germany				
2	1	Jeffrey Hoogland	Netherlands				Q
2	2	Harrie Lavreysen	Netherlands	DNS			
3	1	Denis Dmitriev	Russia	10.314		10.378	Q
3	2	Mateusz Rudyk	Poland		10.247		
4	1	Andriy Vynokurov	Ukraine		10.154	10.197	Q
4	2	Vasilijus Lendel	Lithuania	10.201			

=== Semi-finals ===
Winners proceed to the gold medal final; losers proceed to the bronze medal final.

Heat	Rank	Name	Nation	Race 1	Race 2	Decider	Notes
1	1	Sébastien Vigier	France	10.787	10.428		Q
1	2	Andriy Vynokurov	Ukraine				
2	1	Jeffrey Hoogland	Netherlands		10.315	11.673	Q
2	2	Denis Dmitriev	Russia	10.456			

=== Finals ===
The final classification is determined in the medal finals.

Rank	Name	Nation	Race 1	Race 2	Decider
Bronze medal final
3rd place, bronze medalist(s)	Denis Dmitriev	Russia	10.334	10.103	
4	Andriy Vynokurov	Ukraine		REL	
Gold medal final
1st place, gold medalist(s)	Sébastien Vigier	France	10.377	10.412	
2nd place, silver medalist(s)	Jeffrey Hoogland	Netherlands			
