= 2018 UEC European Track Championships – Men's 1 km time trial =

Men's 1 km time trial at the 2018 UEC European Track Championships
- Venue: Sir Chris Hoy Velodrome, Glasgow
- Date: 4 August
- Competitors: 20 from 13 nations
- Winning time: 1:00.134

Medalists
gold medal	Matthijs Büchli	Netherlands
silver medal	Joachim Eilers	Germany
bronze medal	Sam Ligtlee	Netherlands

The men's 1 km time trial competition at the 2018 UEC European Track Championships was held on 4 August 2018.

== Results ==
=== Qualifying ===
The top 8 riders qualified for the final.

Rank	Name	Nation	Time	Behind	Notes
1	Matthijs Büchli	Netherlands	59.783		Q
2	Joachim Eilers	Germany	1:00.735	+0.952	Q
3	Michaël D'Almeida	France	1:00.926	+1.143	Q
4	Quentin Lafargue	France	1:00.929	+1.146	Q
5	Maximilian Dörnbach	Germany	1:01.193	+1.410	Q
6	Francesco Lamon	Italy	1:01.342	+1.559	Q
7	Sam Ligtlee	Netherlands	1:01.388	+1.605	Q
8	Robin Wagner	Czech Republic	1:01.830	+2.047	Q
9	Tomáš Bábek	Czech Republic	1:01.928	+2.145	
10	Joseph Truman	Great Britain	1:02.167	+2.384	
11	José Moreno Sánchez	Spain	1:02.515	+2.732	
12	Uladzislau Novik	Belarus	1:02.612	+2.829	
13	Alexander Dubchenko	Russia	1:02.646	+2.863	
14	Ayrton De Pauw	Belgium	1:02.708	+2.925	
15	Alexandr Vasyukhno	Russia	1:02.759	+2.976	
16	Daniel Rochna	Poland	1:03.038	+3.255	
17	Francesco Ceci	Italy	1:03.101	+3.318	
18	Alejandro Martínez	Spain	1:03.192	+3.409	
19	Maksym Lopatiuk	Georgia	1:03.886	+4.103	
20	Norbert Szabo	Romania	1:05.642	+5.859	

=== Final ===
The final was held at 14:43.

Rank	Name	Nation	Time	Behind	Notes
1st place, gold medalist(s)	Matthijs Büchli	Netherlands	1:00.134		
2nd place, silver medalist(s)	Joachim Eilers	Germany	1:00.361	+0.227	
3rd place, bronze medalist(s)	Sam Ligtlee	Netherlands	1:00.905	+0.771	
4	Quentin Lafargue	France	1:00.929	+0.795	
5	Maximilian Dörnbach	Germany	1:01.166	+1.032	
6	Michaël D'Almeida	France	1:01.499	+1.365	
7	Robin Wagner	Czech Republic	1:01.508	+1.374	
8	Francesco Lamon	Italy	1:01.680	+1.546	
