= 2021 UEC European Track Championships – Men's 1 km time trial =

Men's 1 km time trial at the 2021 UEC European Track Championships
- Venue: Tissot Velodrome, Grenchen
- Date: 6 October
- Competitors: 25 from 14 nations
- Winning time: 58.016

Medalists
gold medal	Jeffrey Hoogland	Netherlands
silver medal	Sam Ligtlee	Netherlands
bronze medal	Patryk Rajkowski	Poland

The men's 1 km time trial competition at the 2021 UEC European Track Championships was held on 6 October 2021.

== Results ==
=== Qualifying ===
The top 8 riders qualified for the final.

Rank	Name	Nation	Time	Behind	Notes
1	Jeffrey Hoogland	Netherlands	58.286		Q
2	Patryk Rajkowski	Poland	59.502	+1.216	Q
3	Sam Ligtlee	Netherlands	59.882	+1.596	Q
4	Alejandro Martínez	Spain	1:00.377	+2.091	Q
5	Davide Boscaro	Italy	1:00.429	+2.143	Q
6	Joachim Eilers	Germany	1:00.431	+2.145	Q
7	Anton Höhne	Germany	1:00.783	+2.497	Q
8	Robin Wagner	Czech Republic	1:00.833	+2.547	Q
9	Alexander Sharapov	Russia	1:00.891	+2.605	
10	Ivan Gladyshev	Russia	1:01.161	+2.875	
11	Hayden Norris	Great Britain	1:01.331	+3.045	
12	Tomáš Bábek	Czech Republic	1:01.652	+3.366	
13	Mattia Pinazzi	Italy	1:02.182	+3.896	
14	Uladzislau Novik	Belarus	1:02.341	+4.055	
15	Sándor Szalontay	Hungary	1:02.381	+4.095	
16	James Bunting	Great Britain	1:02.789	+4.503	
17	Ekain Jiménez	Spain	1:02.957	+4.671	
18	Norbert Szabó	Romania	1:02.961	+4.675	
19	Miroslav Minchev	Bulgaria	1:03.317	+5.031	
20	Filip Prokopyszyn	Poland	1:03.961	+5.675	
21	Vladyslav Denysenko	Ukraine	1:04.104	+5.818	
22	Aliaksandr Hlova	Belarus	1:04.168	+5.882	
23	Bohdan Danylchuk	Ukraine	1:04.562	+6.276	
24	Ioannis Kalogeropoulos	Greece	1:04.991	+6.705	
25	Sotirios Bretas	Greece	1:12.987	+14.701	

=== Final ===
Rank	Name	Nation	Time	Behind	Notes
1st place, gold medalist(s)	Jeffrey Hoogland	Netherlands	58.016		
2nd place, silver medalist(s)	Sam Ligtlee	Netherlands	59.767	+1.751	
3rd place, bronze medalist(s)	Patryk Rajkowski	Poland	59.890	+1.874	
4	Joachim Eilers	Germany	1:00.265	+2.249	
5	Alejandro Martínez	Spain	1:00.419	+2.403	
6	Anton Höhne	Germany	1:00.425	+2.409	
7	Davide Boscaro	Italy	1:00.967	+2.951	
8	Robin Wagner	Czech Republic	1:01.337	+3.321	
