= 2017 UCI Track Cycling World Championships – Men's team sprint =

Men's team sprint at the 2017 UCI Track Cycling World Championships
- Venue: Hong Kong Velodrome
- Location: Hong Kong
- Dates: 12 April
- Competitors: 53 from 16 nations
- Teams: 16
- Winning time: 44.049

Medalists
gold medal	Ethan Mitchell; Sam Webster; Eddie Dawkins	New Zealand
silver medal	Jeffrey Hoogland; Harrie Lavreysen; Matthijs Büchli; Theo Bos; Nils van 't Hoenderdaal	Netherlands
bronze medal	Benjamin Edelin; Sebastien Vigier; Quentin Lafargue; François Pervis	France

The Men's team sprint competition at the 2017 World Championships was held on 12 April 2017.

== Results ==
=== Qualifying ===
The fastest 8 teams qualified for the first round.

Rank	Name	Nation	Time	Behind	Notes
1	Eddie Dawkins; Ethan Mitchell; Sam Webster	New Zealand	43.267		Q
2	Benjamin Edelin; Quentin Lafargue; Sebastien Vigier	France	43.390	+0.123	Q
3	Jack Carlin; Ryan Owens; Joseph Truman	Great Britain	43.416	+0.149	Q
4	Maciej Bielecki; Krzysztof Maksel; Mateusz Rudyk	Poland	43.419	+0.152	Q
5	Li Jianxin; Luo Yongjia; Xu Chao	China	43.878	+0.611	Q
6	Theo Bos; Jeffrey Hoogland; Nils van 't Hoenderdaal	Netherlands	43.970	+0.703	Q
7	Matthew Glaetzer; Nathan Hart; Jacob Schmid	Australia	44.136	+0.869	Q
8	Yoshitaku Nagasako; Yudai Nitta; Kazunari Watanabe	Japan	44.363	+1.096	Q
9	Tomáš Bábek; Pavel Kelemen; David Sojka	Czech Republic	44.606	+1.339	
10	Alejandro Martínez; José Moreno Sánchez; Juan Peralta	Spain	44.695	+1.428	
11	Rubén Murillo; Fabián Puerta; Santiago Ramírez	Colombia	44.702	+1.435	
12	Eric Engler; Robert Förstemann; Max Niederlag	Germany	44.708	+1.441	
13	Kirill Samusenko; Aleksei Tkachev; Pavel Yakushevskiy	Russia	44.898	+1.631	
14	Uladzislau Novik; Yauhen Veremchuk; Artsiom Zaitsau	Belarus	45.445	+2.178	
15	Hugo Barrette; Stefan Ritter; Patrice St Louis Pivin	Canada	45.772	+2.505	
16	Saúl Gutiérrez; Manuel Resendez; Edgar Verdugo	Mexico	46.133	+2.866	

- Q = qualified

=== First round ===
First round heats were held as follows:
Heat 1: 4th v 5th fastest
Heat 2: 3rd v 6th fastest
Heat 3: 2nd v 7th fastest
Heat 4: 1st v 8th fastest

The heat winners were ranked on time, from which the top 2 proceeding to the gold medal final and the other 2 proceeding to the bronze medal final.

Rank	Overall rank	Name	Nation	Time	Behind	Notes
1 vs 8
1	1	Ethan Mitchell; Sam Webster; Eddie Dawkins	New Zealand	43.183		QG
2	7	Yoshitaku Nagasako; Yudai Nitta; Kazunari Watanabe	Japan	44.158	+0.975	
2 vs 7
1	3	Benjamin Edelin; Sebastien Vigier; François Pervis	France	43.645		QB
2	6	Nathan Hart; Matthew Glaetzer; Patrick Constable	Australia	43.736	+0.091	
3 vs 6
1	2	Nils van 't Hoenderdaal; Harrie Lavreysen; Matthijs Büchli	Netherlands	43.481		QG
2	5	Jack Carlin; Ryan Owens; Joseph Truman	Great Britain	43.666	+0.185	
4 vs 5
1	4	Maciej Bielecki; Mateusz Rudyk; Krzysztof Maksel	Poland	43.834		QB
2	8	Li Jianxin; Luo Yongjia; Xu Chao	China	44.654	+0.820	

- QG = qualified for gold medal final
- QB = qualified for bronze medal final

=== Finals ===
The final was started at 20:58.

Rank	Name	Nation	Time	Behind	Notes
Gold medal final
1st place, gold medalist(s)	Ethan Mitchell; Sam Webster; Eddie Dawkins	New Zealand	44.049		
2nd place, silver medalist(s)	Jeffrey Hoogland; Harrie Lavreysen; Matthijs Büchli	Netherlands	44.382	+0.332	
Bronze medal final
3rd place, bronze medalist(s)	Benjamin Edelin; Sebastien Vigier; Quentin Lafargue	France	43.536		
4	Maciej Bielecki; Rafał Sarnecki; Mateusz Rudyk	Poland	43.698	+0.162	
