= 2015 UEC European Track Championships – Men's 1 km time trial =

Men's 1km time trial at the 2015 UEC European Track Championships
- UEC European Champion jersey
- Venue: Velodrome Suisse, Grenchen
- Date: 17 October
- Competitors: 17 from 14 nations

Medalists
| gold medal | Jeffrey Hoogland | Netherlands |
| silver medal | Joachim Eilers | Germany |
| bronze medal | Robin Wagner | Czech Republic |

The Men's 1 km time trial was held on 17 October 2015.

== Results ==
| Rank | Name | Nation | Time | Notes |
|---|---|---|---|---|
| 1st place, gold medalist(s) | Jeffrey Hoogland | Netherlands | 1:00.350 | |
| 2nd place, silver medalist(s) | Joachim Eilers | Germany | 1:00.569 | |
| 3rd place, bronze medalist(s) | Robin Wagner | Czech Republic | 1:01.057 | |
| 4 | Maximilian Dornbach | Germany | 1:01.849 | |
| 5 | Grzegorz Drejgier | Poland | 1:01.933 | |
| 6 | José Moreno Sánchez | Spain | 1:01.973 | |
| 7 | Alexey Tkachev | Russia | 1:02.230 | |
| 8 | Matthew Crampton | Great Britain | 1:02.504 | |
| 9 | Nils van 't Hoenderdaal | Netherlands | 1:02.801 | |
| 10 | Eoin Mullen | Ireland | 1:03.473 | |
| 11 | Daniel Hartvig | Denmark | 1:04.049 | |
| 12 | Alexander Perez | Norway | 1:04.604 | |
| 13 | Miroslav Minchev | Bulgaria | 1:04.678 | |
| 14 | Andriy Kutsenko | Ukraine | 1:04.998 | |
| 15 | Mathias Møller Nielsen | Denmark | 1:05.057 | |
| 16 | Mika Simola | Finland | 1:06.238 | |
| 17 | Anton Ivashkin | Belarus | 1:07.582 | |
