= 2021 UCI Track Cycling World Championships – Men's 1 km time trial =

Men's 1 km time trial at the 2021 UCI Track Cycling World Championships
- Venue: Vélodrome Couvert Régional Jean Stablinski
- Location: Roubaix, France
- Dates: 22 October
- Competitors: 23 from 19 nations
- Winning time: 58.418

Medalists
gold medal	Jeffrey Hoogland	Netherlands
silver medal	Nicholas Paul	Trinidad and Tobago
bronze medal	Joachim Eilers	Germany

The Men's 1 km time trial competition at the 2021 UCI Track Cycling World Championships was held on 22 October 2021.

== Results ==
=== Qualifying ===
The qualifying was started at 13:46. The top eight riders qualified for the final.

Rank	Name	Nation	Time	Behind	Notes
1	Jeffrey Hoogland	Netherlands	58.746		Q
2	Nicholas Paul	Trinidad and Tobago	59.269	+0.523	Q
3	Joachim Eilers	Germany	1:00.233	+1.487	Q
4	Sam Ligtlee	Netherlands	1:00.441	+1.695	Q
5	Patryk Rajkowski	Poland	1:00.510	+1.764	Q
6	Alexander Sharapov	Russian Cycling Federation	1:00.749	+2.003	Q
7	Yuta Obara	Japan	1:00.989	+2.152	Q
8	Alejandro Martínez	Spain	1:01.000	+2.254	Q
9	Davide Boscaro	Italy	1:01.281	+2.535	
10	Robin Wagner	Czech Republic	1:01.292	+2.546	
11	Santiago Ramírez	Colombia	1:01.339	+2.593	
12	Anton Höhne	Germany	1:01.431	+2.685	
13	Ryan Dodyk	Canada	1:01.440	+2.694	
14	Muhammad Fadhil Mohd Zonis	Malaysia	1:01.589	+2.843	
15	Ivan Gladyshev	Russian Cycling Federation	1:01.835	+3.089	
16	Andrey Chugay	Kazakhstan	1:02.232	+3.486	
17	Dominik Topinka	Czech Republic	1:02.649	+3.897	
18	Ronaldo Laitonjam	India	1:02.656	+3.910	
19	Juan Ruiz	Mexico	1:02.834	+4.088	
20	Vladyslav Denysenko	Ukraine	1:04.074	+5.328	
21	Mitchell Sparrow	South Africa	1:04.327	+5.581	
22	Mohamed Elyas Yusoff	Singapore	1:04.370	+5.624	
23	Norbert Szabo	Romania	1:04.445	+5.699	

=== Final ===
The final was started at 20:00.

Rank	Name	Nation	Time	Behind	Notes
1st place, gold medalist(s)	Jeffrey Hoogland	Netherlands	58.418		
2nd place, silver medalist(s)	Nicholas Paul	Trinidad and Tobago	59.791	+1.373	
3rd place, bronze medalist(s)	Joachim Eilers	Germany	1:00.008	+0.217	
4	Patryk Rajkowski	Poland	1:00.624	+0.833	
5	Sam Ligtlee	Netherlands	1:00.669	+0.878	
6	Alexander Sharapov	Russian Cycling Federation	1:00.928	+1.137	
7	Alejandro Martínez	Spain	1:01.213	+1.467	
8	Yuta Obara	Japan	1:01.385	+1.595	
