= 2017 UEC European Track Championships – Men's 1 km time trial =

Men's 1km time trial at the 2017 UEC European Track Championships
- UEC European Champion jersey
- Venue: Velodrom, Berlin
- Date: 21 October
- Competitors: 22 from 14 nations
- Winning time: 1:00.700

Medalists
gold medal	Jeffrey Hoogland	Netherlands
silver medal	Joachim Eilers	Germany
bronze medal	Quentin Lafargue	France

The Men's 1 km time trial was held on 21 October 2017.

== Results ==
=== Qualifying ===
The top 8 riders qualified for the final.

Rank	Name	Nation	Time	Notes
1	Quentin Lafargue	France	1:00.560	Q
2	Jeffrey Hoogland	Netherlands	1:00.818	Q
3	Joachim Eilers	Germany	1:01.222	Q
4	Robin Wagner	Czech Republic	1:01.243	Q
5	Eric Engler	Germany	1:01.289	Q
6	Joseph Truman	Great Britain	1:01.335	Q
7	Callum Skinner	Great Britain	1:01.463	Q
8	Alexandr Vasyukhno	Russia	1:01.566	Q
9	David Sojka	Czech Republic	1:01.638	
10	Alexander Dubchenko	Russia	1:01.864	
11	Uladzislau Novik	Belarus	1:01.875	
12	Francesco Lamon	Italy	1:02.259	
13	Sam Ligtlee	Netherlands	1:02.296	
14	José Moreno Sánchez	Spain	1:02.372	
15	Andriy Kutsenko	Ukraine	1:02.935	
16	Maksym Lopatyuk	Ukraine	1:03.909	
17	Adrien Garel	France	1:03.924	
18	Kristian Kaimer Eriksen	Denmark	1:04.128	
19	Alejandro Martínez	Spain	1:04.844	
20	Norbert Szabo	Romania	1:07.019	
21	Tomáš Person	Slovakia	1:07.124	
22	Bartosz Rudyk	Poland	1:08.288	

=== Finals ===
Rank	Name	Nation	Time	Notes
1st place, gold medalist(s)	Jeffrey Hoogland	Netherlands	1:00.700	
2nd place, silver medalist(s)	Joachim Eilers	Germany	1:00.733	
3rd place, bronze medalist(s)	Quentin Lafargue	France	1:00.906	
4	Eric Engler	Germany	1:01.430	
5	Robin Wagner	Czech Republic	1:01.501	
6	Joseph Truman	Great Britain	1:01.816	
7	Alexandr Vasyukhno	Russia	1:02.020	
	Callum Skinner	Great Britain	DNS	
