= UEC European Track Championships – Men's sprint =

UEC European Champion jersey

The Men's sprint at the European Track Championships was first competed in 2010 in Poland, and has been held in each championships since.

The Sprint consists of a qualifying, followed by a knockout system until the final. From the quarterfinals on two wins are needed to advance.

== Medalists ==
Championships	Gold	Silver	Bronze
2010 Pruszków	Denis Dmitriev; Russia	Kévin Sireau; France	Jason Kenny; Great Britain
2011 Apeldoorn	Kévin Sireau; France	Maximilian Levy; Germany	Denis Dmitriev; Russia
2012 Panevėžys	Denis Dmitriev; Russia	Max Niederlag; Germany	Christos Volikakis; Greece
2013 Apeldoorn	Denis Dmitriev; Russia	Robert Förstemann; Germany	Jason Kenny; Great Britain
2014 Guadeloupe	Grégory Baugé; France	Damian Zieliński; Poland	Robert Förstemann; Germany
2015 Grenchen	Jeffrey Hoogland; Netherlands	Max Niederlag; Germany	Damian Zieliński; Poland
2016 Saint-Quentin-en-Yvelines	Pavel Yakushevskiy; Russia	Roy van den Berg; Netherlands	Andriy Vynokurov; Ukraine
2017 Berlin	Sébastien Vigier; France	Jeffrey Hoogland; Netherlands	Denis Dmitriev; Russia
2018 Glasgow	Jeffrey Hoogland; Netherlands	Stefan Bötticher; Germany	Harrie Lavreysen; Netherlands
2019 Apeldoorn	Jeffrey Hoogland; Netherlands	Harrie Lavreysen; Netherlands	Mateusz Rudyk; Poland
2020 Plovdiv	Maximilian Levy; Germany	Denis Dmitriev; Russia	Vasilijus Lendel; Lithuania
2021 Grenchen	Harrie Lavreysen; Netherlands	Jeffrey Hoogland; Netherlands	Mikhail Iakovlev; Russia
2022 Munich	Sébastien Vigier; France	Jack Carlin; Great Britain	Rayan Helal; France
2023 Grenchen	Harrie Lavreysen; Netherlands	Mateusz Rudyk; Poland	Rayan Helal; France
2024 Apeldoorn	Harrie Lavreysen; Netherlands	Mateusz Rudyk; Poland	Mikhail Iakovlev; Israel
2025 Heusden-Zolder	Harrie Lavreysen; Netherlands	Mikhail Yakovlev; Israel	Rayan Helal; France
2026 Konya	Matthew Richardson; Great Britain	Harrie Lavreysen; Netherlands	Nikita Kiriltsev; Individual Neutral Athletes
