= Andrey Kubeev =

Russian cyclist

Personal information
- Born: 9 November 1987 (age 38)

Cycling career
- Sport: Cycling
- Discipline: Track cycling
- Role: Rider
Medal record
European Championships
Bronze medal – third place	2013 Apeldoorn	Team sprint

Andrey Kubeev (born 9 November 1987) is a Russian male track cyclist. He competed at the 2011, 2013 and 2014 UCI Track Cycling World Championships.
