= Timo Bichler =

German cyclist (born 1999)

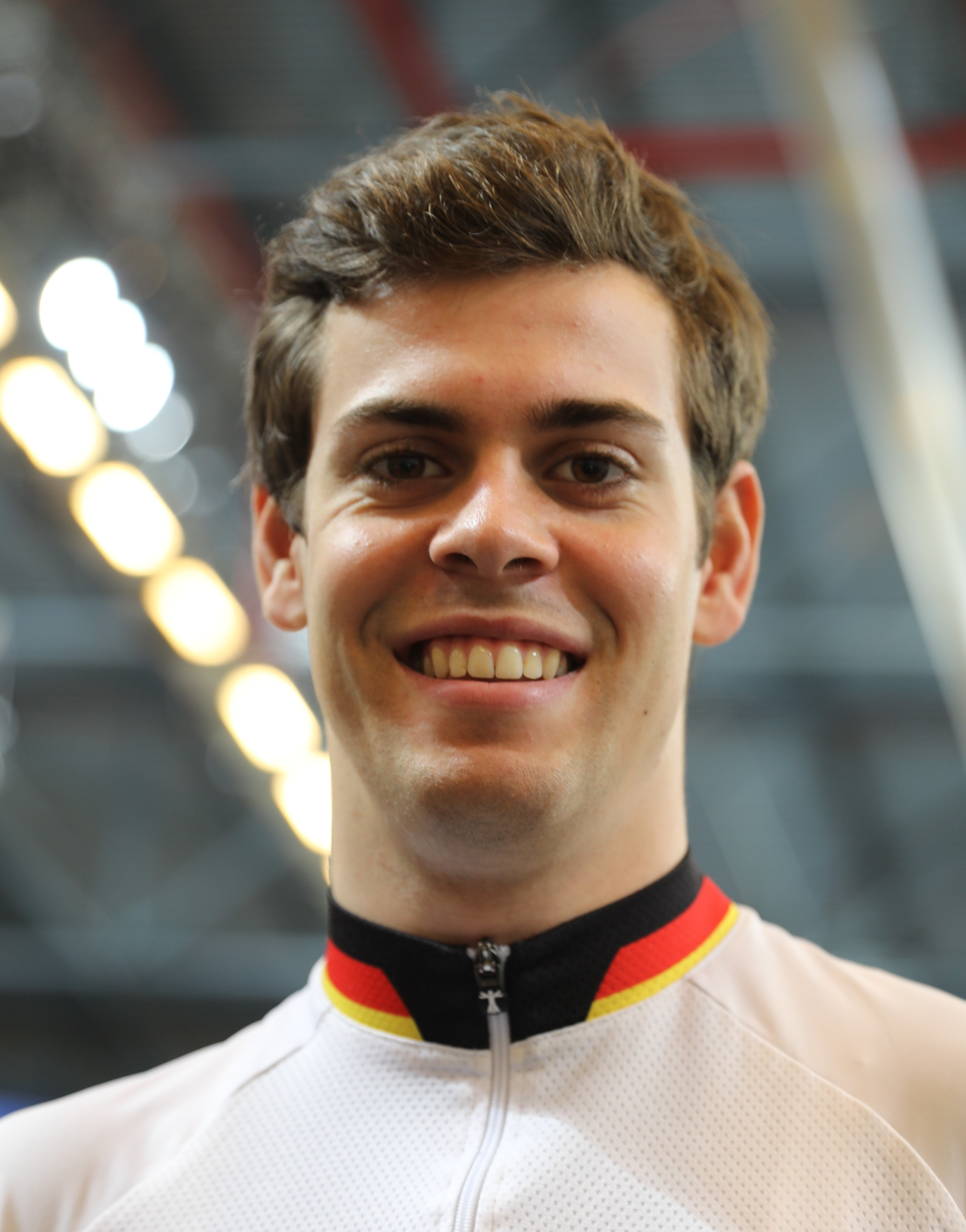
- Bichler in 2019

Personal information
- Born: 22 March 1999 (age 27)

Cycling career
- Sport: Cycling
- Role: Rider
Medal record
Men's track cycling
Representing Germany
European Championships
Bronze medal – third place	2018 Glasgow	Team sprint

Timo Bichler (born 22 March 1999) is a German racing cyclist. In 2018, he won the bronze medal in the men's team sprint event at the 2018 UEC European Track Championships.
