= Jeffrey Hoogland =

Dutch cyclist (born 1993)

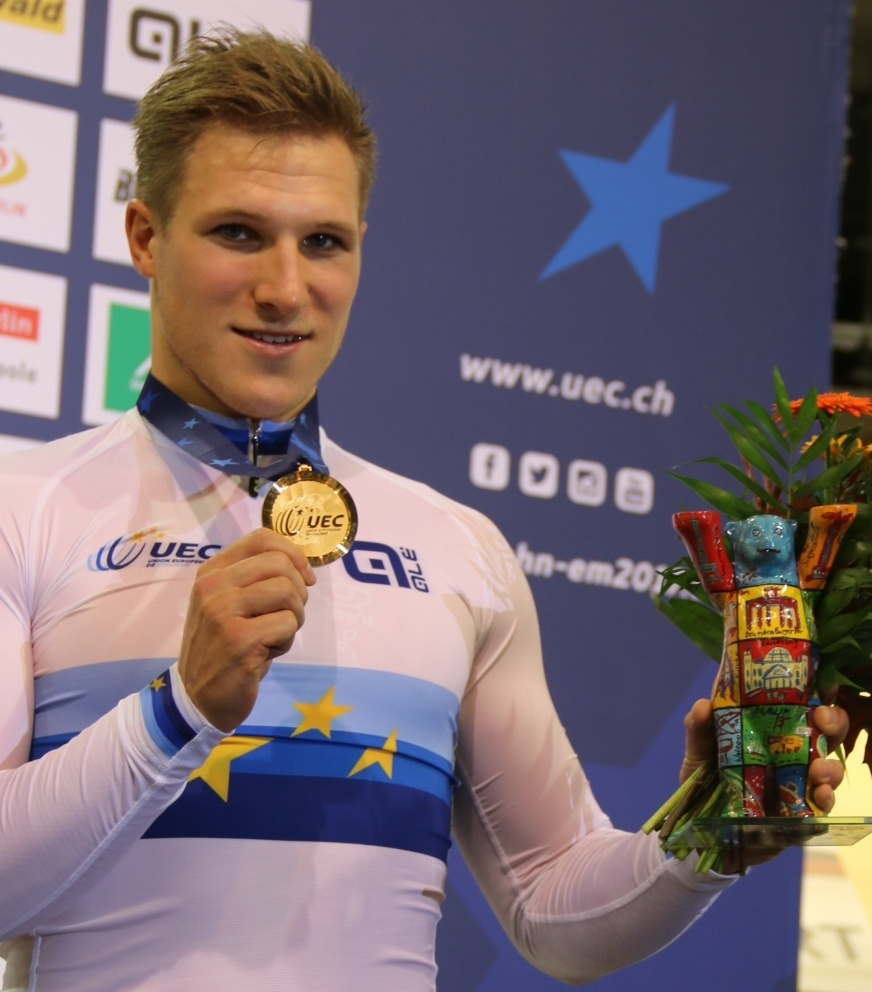
- Hoogland at the 2017 UEC European Track Championships

Personal information
- Born: 16 March 1993 (age 33) Nijverdal, Netherlands
- Height: 1.85 m (6 ft 1 in)
- Weight: 97 kg (214 lb)

Cycling career
- Sport: Cycling
- Discipline: Track
- Role: Rider
- Rider type: Sprinter
Medal record
Men's track cycling
Representing the Netherlands
Event	1st	2nd	3rd
Olympic Games	2	1	0
World Championships	13	11	1
European Championships	15	2	2
European Games	2	0	0
Total	32	14	3
Olympic Games
Gold medal – first place	2020 Tokyo	Team sprint
Gold medal – first place	2024 Paris	Team sprint
Silver medal – second place	2020 Tokyo	Sprint
World Championships
Gold medal – first place	2018 Apeldoorn	1 km time trial
Gold medal – first place	2018 Apeldoorn	Team sprint
Gold medal – first place	2019 Pruszków	Team sprint
Gold medal – first place	2020 Berlin	Team sprint
Gold medal – first place	2021 Roubaix	1 km time trial
Gold medal – first place	2021 Roubaix	Team sprint
Gold medal – first place	2022 Saint-Quentin-en-Yvelines	1 km time trial
Gold medal – first place	2023 Glasgow	1 km time trial
Gold medal – first place	2023 Glasgow	Team sprint
Gold medal – first place	2024 Ballerup	Team sprint
Gold medal – first place	2025 Santiago	Team sprint
Gold medal – first place	2026 Shanghai	1 km time trial
Gold medal – first place	2026 Shanghai	Team sprint
Silver medal – second place	2016 London	Team sprint
Silver medal – second place	2017 Hong Kong	Team sprint
Silver medal – second place	2019 Pruszków	Sprint
Silver medal – second place	2020 Berlin	Sprint
Silver medal – second place	2021 Roubaix	Sprint
Silver medal – second place	2021 Roubaix	Keirin
Silver medal – second place	2022 Saint-Quentin-en-Yvelines	Keirin
Silver medal – second place	2022 Saint-Quentin-en-Yvelines	Team sprint
Silver medal – second place	2024 Ballerup	Sprint
Silver medal – second place	2024 Ballerup	1 km time trial
Silver medal – second place	2025 Santiago	Sprint
Bronze medal – third place	2025 Santiago	Keirin
European Games
Gold medal – first place	2019 Minsk	Sprint
Gold medal – first place	2019 Minsk	Team sprint
European Championships
Gold medal – first place	2015 Grenchen	Sprint
Gold medal – first place	2015 Grenchen	1 km time trial
Gold medal – first place	2015 Grenchen	Team sprint
Gold medal – first place	2017 Berlin	1 km time trial
Gold medal – first place	2018 Glasgow	Sprint
Gold medal – first place	2018 Glasgow	Team sprint
Gold medal – first place	2019 Apeldoorn	Sprint
Gold medal – first place	2019 Apeldoorn	Team sprint
Gold medal – first place	2021 Grenchen	1 km time trial
Gold medal – first place	2021 Grenchen	Keirin
Gold medal – first place	2021 Grenchen	Team sprint
Gold medal – first place	2022 Munich	Team sprint
Gold medal – first place	2023 Grenchen	1 km time trial
Gold medal – first place	2023 Grenchen	Team sprint
Gold medal – first place	2024 Apeldoorn	Team sprint
Silver medal – second place	2017 Berlin	Sprint
Silver medal – second place	2021 Grenchen	Sprint
Bronze medal – third place	2017 Berlin	Team sprint
Bronze medal – third place	2023 Grenchen	Keirin

Jeffrey Hoogland (born 16 March 1993) is a Dutch track cyclist. He represented his nation in eleven editions of the UCI Track Cycling World Championships (since 2013). At the 2015 UEC European Track Championships, he collected a total of three gold medals, individually in the sprint and the 1 km time trial, and with Nils van 't Hoenderdaal and Hugo Haak in the team sprint. On 31 Oct 2023, Hoogland beat the 10 year old 1 km world record with the time of 55.433 sec.

He is a 7-time World Champion in the team sprint (2018–2021, 2023–2025) and a 4-time World Champion in the 1 km time trial (2018, 2021–2023). Hoogland won a silver medal at the 2020 Summer Olympics in the sprint event and was a part of the team that won a gold medal in the team sprint competition, setting the new Olympic record in the finals. He was also a member of the team that retained the team sprint title at the 2024 Summer Olympics.

At the 2025 Track Cycling World Championships in Santiago, Hoogland, along with teammates Harrie Lavreysen and Roy van den Berg, claimed first place in the team sprint.

== Career achievements ==
=== Major championship results ===
Event		2013	2014	2015	2016	2017	2018	2019	2020	2021	2022	2023	2024	2025	2026
Olympic Games	Sprint	Not Held			11	Not Held				2	Not Held		4	Not Held	
Olympic Games	Team sprint	Not Held			6	Not Held				1	Not Held		1	Not Held	
Olympic Games	Keirin	Not Held			—	Not Held				—	Not Held		13	Not Held	
World Championships	Sprint	35	7	4	9	—	9	2	2	2	—	16	2	6	11
World Championships	Team sprint	13	8	5	2	2	1	1	1	1	2	1	1	1	1
World Championships	Time trial	—	—	—	—	—	1	—	—	1	1	1	2	2	1
World Championships	Keirin	—	—	—	—	—	—	—	7	2	2	6	6	3	16
European Championships	Sprint	19	—	1	—	2	1	1	—	2	—	8	4	—	—
European Championships	Team sprint	—	5	1	—	3	1	1	—	1	1	1	1	—	—
European Championships	Time trial	NH	—	1	—	1	—	—	—	1	—	1	—	—	—
European Championships	Keirin	—	—	—	—	—	—	—	—	1	—	3	9	—	—

== See also ==
- List of world records in track cycling
- List of European records in track cycling
- List of World Championship medalists in men's keirin
- List of European Championship medalists in men's sprint
