= Maximilian Levy =

German track cyclist

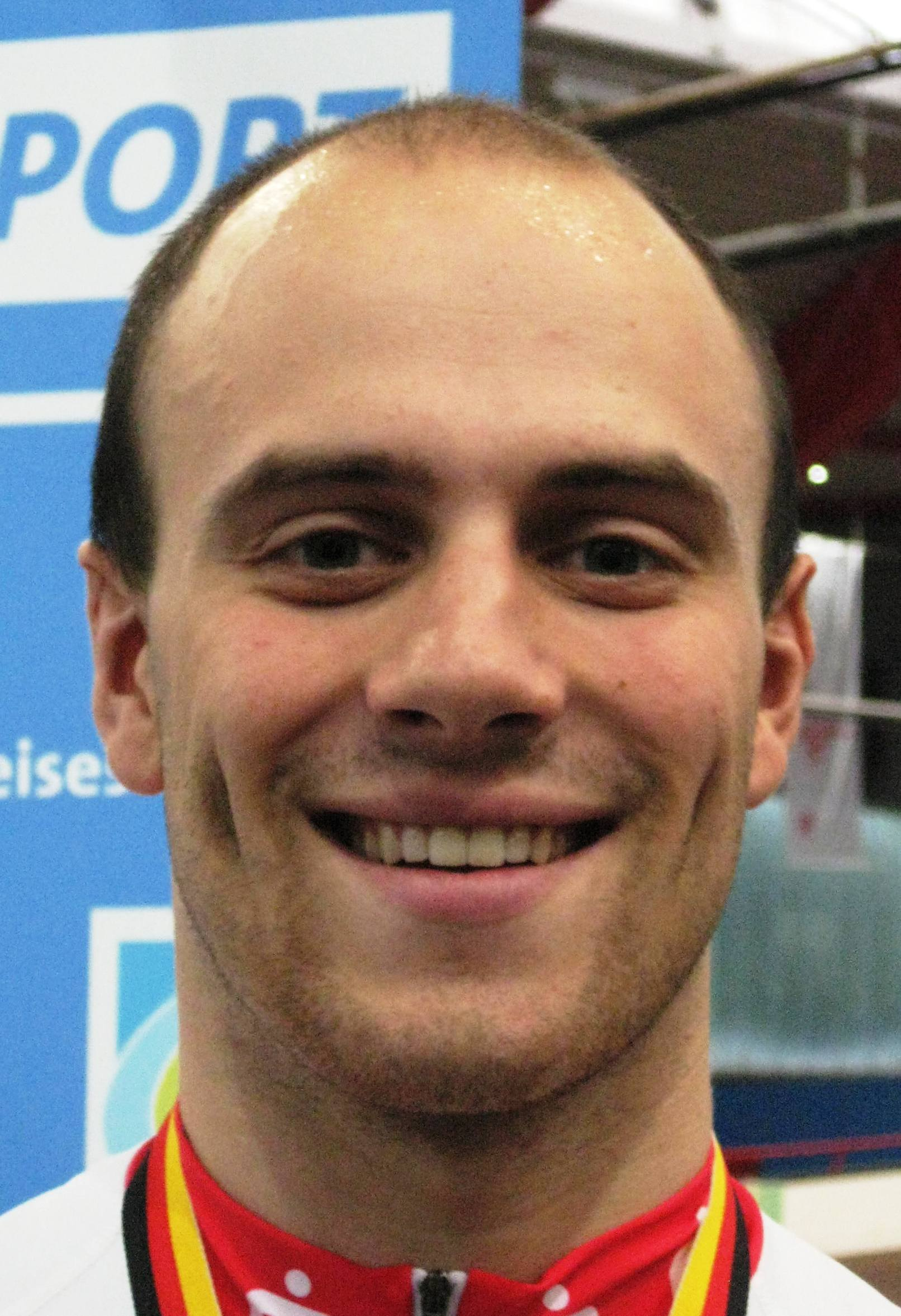

Personal information
- Born: 26 June 1987 (age 39) Berlin, Germany

Cycling career
- Sport: Cycling
- Discipline: Track cycling
- Role: Rider
- Rider type: Sprinter
Medal record
Men's track cycling
Representing Germany
Olympic Games
Silver medal – second place	2012 London	Keirin
Bronze medal – third place	2008 Beijing	Team sprint
Bronze medal – third place	2012 London	Team sprint
World Championships
Gold medal – first place	2009 Pruszków	Keirin
Gold medal – first place	2010 Ballerup	Team sprint
Gold medal – first place	2011 Apeldoorn	Team sprint
Gold medal – first place	2013 Minsk	Team sprint
Silver medal – second place	2012 Melbourne	Keirin
Silver medal – second place	2013 Minsk	Keirin
Silver medal – second place	2014 Cali	Team sprint
Bronze medal – third place	2007 Palma de Mallorca	Team sprint
Bronze medal – third place	2010 Ballerup	Keirin
Bronze medal – third place	2018 Apeldoorn	Keirin
European Championships
Gold medal – first place	2010 Pruszków	Team sprint
Gold medal – first place	2013 Apeldoorn	Team sprint
Gold medal – first place	2013 Apeldoorn	Keirin
Gold medal – first place	2017 Berlin	Keirin
Gold medal – first place	2020 Plovdiv	Sprint
Gold medal – first place	2020 Plovdiv	Keirin
Silver medal – second place	2011 Apeldoorn	Sprint
Silver medal – second place	2017 Berlin	Team sprint
Bronze medal – third place	2015 Grenchen	Team sprint
Junior World Championships
Gold medal – first place	2004 Los Angeles	1km time trial
Gold medal – first place	2004 Los Angeles	Team sprint
Gold medal – first place	2005 Vienna	1km time trial
Gold medal – first place	2005 Vienna	Team sprint
Gold medal – first place	2005 Vienna	Sprint
Bronze medal – third place	2004 Los Angeles	Sprint
U23 & Junior European Championships
Gold medal – first place	2005 Fiorenzuola	Junior 1 km time trial
Gold medal – first place	2005 Fiorenzuola	Junior Sprint
Gold medal – first place	2006 Athens	U23 Sprint
Gold medal – first place	2006 Athens	U23 Team sprint
Silver medal – second place	2006 Athens	U23 Keirin
Bronze medal – third place	2006 Athens	U23 1 km time trial
Bronze medal – third place	2007 Cottbus	U23 1 km time trial

Maximilian Levy (born 26 June 1987) is a German former track cyclist.

Levy won a bronze medal in the men's team sprint representing Germany at the 2008 Olympic Games held in Beijing, China. At the 2012 Summer Olympics, he won another bronze in the men's team sprint, and a silver in the men's keirin. He was the world champion in keirin 2009 and in the team sprint 2010, 2011, and 2013. Levy retired from competition after the conclusion of the 2021 UCI Track Champions League in December of that year.

== Major results ==
2004
1st World Junior Track Cycling championships (Kilo)
1st World Junior Track Cycling championships (Team sprint) with Robert Förstemann & Benjamin Wittmann
2005
1st National Championship (Kilo)
1st European Junior Track Championships (Kilo)
1st European Junior Track Championships (Individual sprint)
1st World Junior Track Cycling championships (Team sprint) with René Enders & Benjamin Wittmann
1st World Junior Track Cycling championships (Kilo)
1st World Junior Track Cycling championships (Individual sprint)
1st UCI Track World Cup – Manchester (Keirin)
2006
1st European U23 Track Championships (Team sprint) René Enders & Michael Seidenbecher
1st European U23 Track Championships (Individual sprint)
2008
1st National Championship (Keirin)
2009
1st World Track Cycling championships (Keirin)
1st Open NK wegsprint, (Enkhuizen)
1st National Championship (Keirin)
2010
1st World Track Cycling championships (Team sprint) with Robert Förstemann & Stefan Nimke
1st European Track Championships (Team sprint) with Robert Förstemann & Stefan Nimke
2011
1st Manchester International Keirin
1st National Championship (Keirin)
1st National Championship (Team sprint) with Carsten Bergemann & Robert Förstemann
1st Astana (Team sprint) with Joachim Eilers & Robert Förstemann
1st UCI Track World Cup – Cali (Team sprint) with René Enders & Stefan Nimke
1st UCI Track World Cup – Cali (Keirin)
2012
1st UCI Track World Cup – London (Team sprint) with René Enders & Robert Förstemann
1st Cottbus (Keirin)
1st Köln (Individual sprint)
1st National Championship (Team sprint) Stefan Bötticher & Max Niederlag
2013
1st World Track Cycling championships (Team sprint) Stefan Bötticher & René Enders
1st Drei Bahnen Tournee (Individual sprint)
1st National Championship (Kilo)
1st National Championship (Keirin)
1st European Track Championships (Team sprint) with René Enders & Robert Förstemann
1st European Track Championships (Keirin)
2014
1st Wien, 1 km, Wien (Wien), Austria
1st Anadia (Individual sprint)
1st Anadia (Keirin)
2015
1st Cottbus (Individual sprint)
1st Dudenhofen (Individual sprint)
1st National Championship (Individual sprint)
1st National Championship (Keirin)
2016
1st Sprinters Omnium, Six Day Amsterdam
2nd Sprinters Omnium, Six Day London
2017
UEC European Track Championships

1st Keirin
2nd Team Sprint

1st Sprinters Omnium, Six Day Berlin
3rd Sprinters Omnium, Six Day London

== See also ==
- List of World Championship medalists in men's keirin
- List of European Championship medalists in men's sprint
