= Stefan Bötticher =

German cyclist (born 1992)

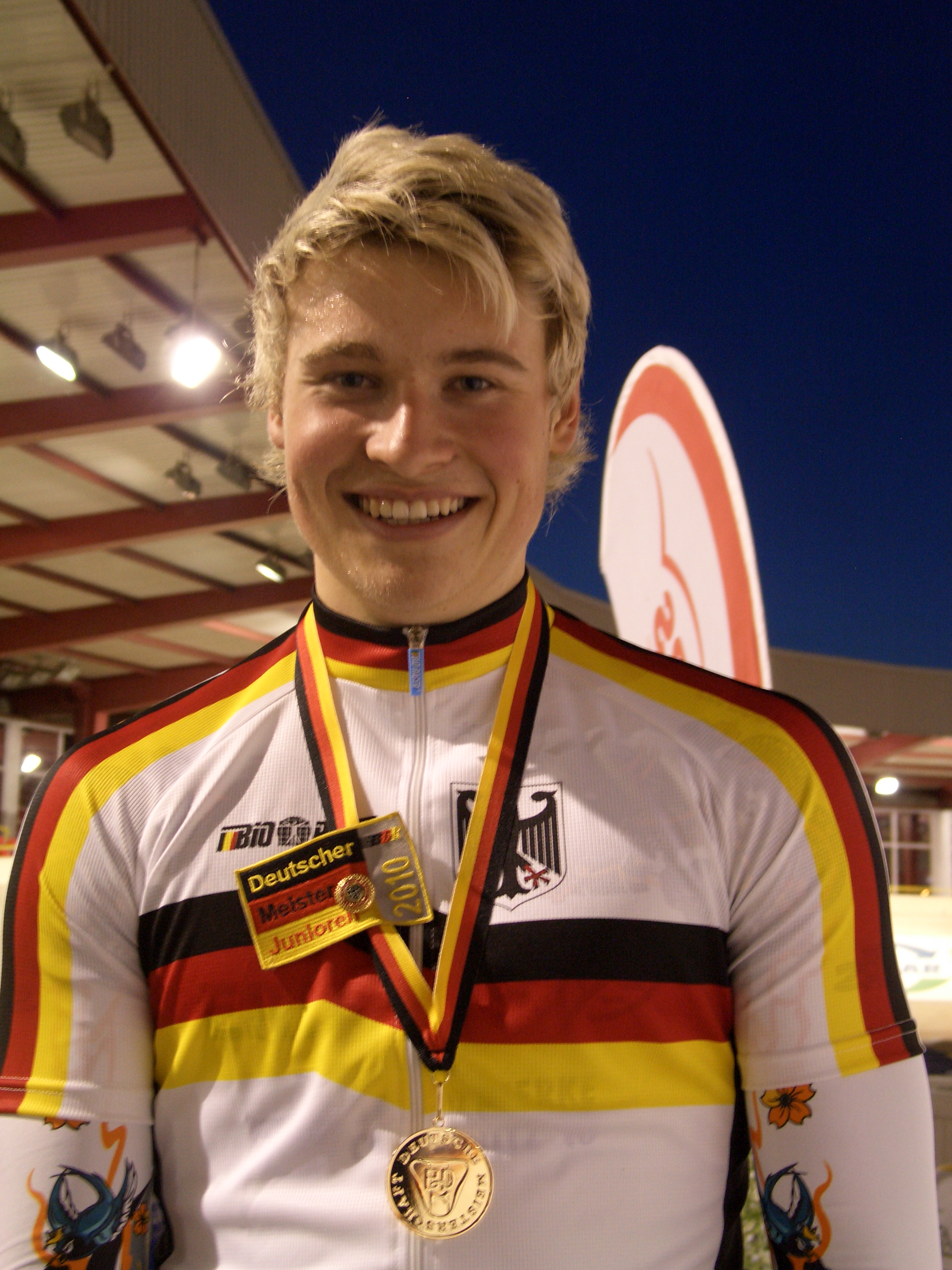

Personal information
- Born: 1 February 1992 (age 34) Leinefelde-Worbis, Germany
- Height: 1.84 m (6 ft 0 in)
- Weight: 91 kg (201 lb)

Cycling career
- Sport: Cycling
- Discipline: Track
- Role: Rider
- Rider type: Sprinter
Medal record
Men's track cycling
Representing Germany
World Championships
Gold medal – first place	2013 Minsk	Sprint
Gold medal – first place	2013 Minsk	Team sprint
Silver medal – second place	2014 Cali	Sprint
Bronze medal – third place	2019 Pruszków	Keirin
Bronze medal – third place	2021 Roubaix	Team sprint
European Championships
Gold medal – first place	2018 Glasgow	Keirin
Silver medal – second place	2018 Glasgow	Sprint
Bronze medal – third place	2018 Glasgow	Team sprint

Stefan Bötticher (born 1 February 1992) is a German track cyclist who competes in the sprint events. At the 2013 UCI Track Cycling World Championships he won gold medals in the individual sprint race and the team sprint.

== See also ==
- List of European Championship medalists in men's sprint
