= Michaël D'Almeida =

French cyclist (born 1987)

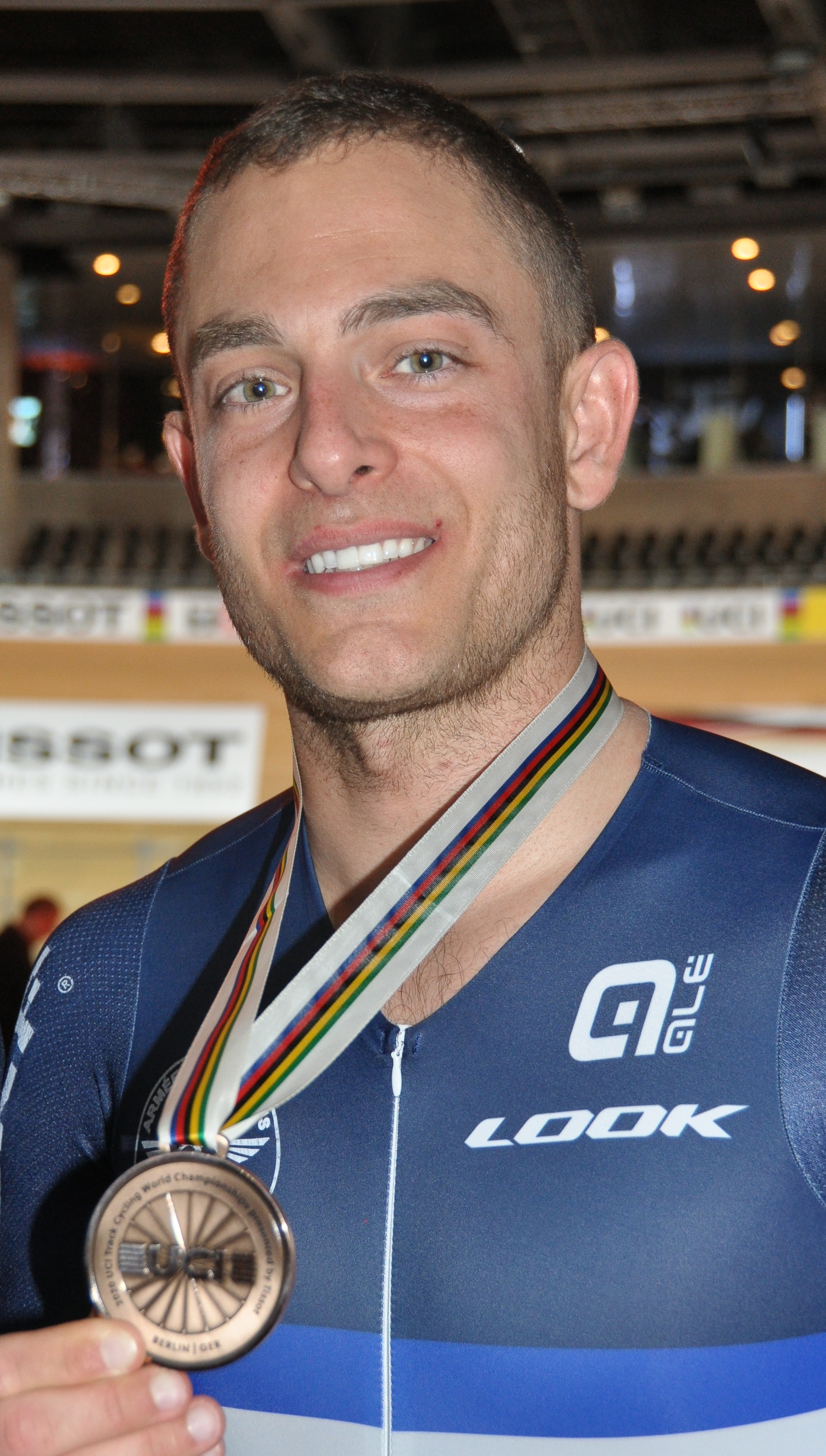
- D'Almeida (2020)

Personal information
- Born: 3 September 1987 (age 39) Évry, France
- Height: 1.76 m (5 ft 9 in)
- Weight: 80 kg (176 lb)

Cycling career
- Sport: Cycling
- Discipline: Track cycling
- Role: Rider
- Rider type: Sprinter

Amateur team
- 2006–: US Créteil
Medal record
Men's track cycling
Representing France
Olympic Games
| Silver medal – second place | 2012 London | Team sprint |
| Bronze medal – third place | 2016 Rio de Janeiro | Team sprint |
World Championships
| Gold medal – first place | 2015 Yvelines | Team sprint |
| Silver medal – second place | 2008 Manchester | 1 km time trial |
| Silver medal – second place | 2010 Ballerup | Team sprint |
| Silver medal – second place | 2010 Ballerup | 1 km time trial |
| Silver medal – second place | 2012 Melbourne | Team sprint |
| Silver medal – second place | 2012 Melbourne | 1 km time trial |
| Silver medal – second place | 2019 Pruszków | Team sprint |
| Bronze medal – third place | 2013 Minsk | Team sprint |
| Bronze medal – third place | 2014 Cali | Team sprint |
| Bronze medal – third place | 2018 Apeldoorn | Team sprint |
| Bronze medal – third place | 2019 Pruszków | Time trial |
| Bronze medal – third place | 2020 Berlin | 1 km time trial |
| Disqualified | 2011 Apeldoorn | Team sprint |
European Championships
| Silver medal – second place | 2010 Pruszków | Team sprint |
| Silver medal – second place | 2013 Apeldoorn | Team sprint |
| Silver medal – second place | 2014 Baie-Mahault | Team sprint |
| Silver medal – second place | 2018 Glasgow | Team sprint |
| Bronze medal – third place | 2019 Apeldoorn | 1 km time trial |

Michaël D'Almeida (born 3 September 1987) is a French track cyclist. He specialises in track sprint events including the sprint, team sprint, keirin and 1 kilometer. He has ridden for the Union sportive de Créteil cycling club since 2006. D'Almeida is married and has children, he is involved with the French armed forces.

== Major results ==
2005
1st (Europe) team sprint, 2007 European Track Championships – Junior
2nd team sprint, UCI Track Cycling World Championships – Junior
3rd team sprint, French National Track Championships – Senior
3rd sprint, French National Track Championships – Junior
3rd kilo, French National Track Championships – Junior

2006
1st (France) team sprint, French National Track Championships – Senior
3rd kilo, French National Track Championships – Senior
3rd sprint, French National Track Championships – U23

2007
1st (Europe) team sprint, 2007 European Track Championships – U23
2nd kilo, 2007 European Track Championships – U23
1st kilo, round 1, 2007–2008 UCI Track Cycling World Cup Classics, Sydney

2008
1st (Europe) kilo, 2008 European Track Championships – U23
1st sprint, 2008 European Track Championships – U23
1st keirin, 2008 European Track Championships – U23
1st (France) kilo, French National Track Championships – Senior
2nd kilo, 2008 UCI Track Cycling World Championships
1st kilo, round 2, 2008–2009 UCI Track Cycling World Cup Classics, Melbourne
2nd sprint, round 2, 2008–2009 UCI Track Cycling World Cup Classics, Melbourne

2009
1st (Europe) kilo, European Track Championships – U23
1st (Europe) team sprint, European Track Championships – U23
2nd team sprint, round 4, 2008–2009 UCI Track Cycling World Cup Classics, Beijing
2nd kilo, round 5, 2008–2009 UCI Track Cycling World Cup Classics, Copenhagen
3rd team sprint, round 5, 2008–2009 UCI Track Cycling World Cup Classics, Copenhagen
1st kilo, round 3, 2008–2009 UCI Track Cycling World Cup Classics, Cali
1st keirin, round 3, 2008–2009 UCI Track Cycling World Cup Classics, Cali
2013
2nd (Europe) team sprint, European Track Championships
2014
1st Keirin, Fenioux Piste International
1st Team sprint, Fenioux Piste International
2nd Sprint, Fenioux Piste International
