= Joachim Eilers =

German cyclist (born 1990)

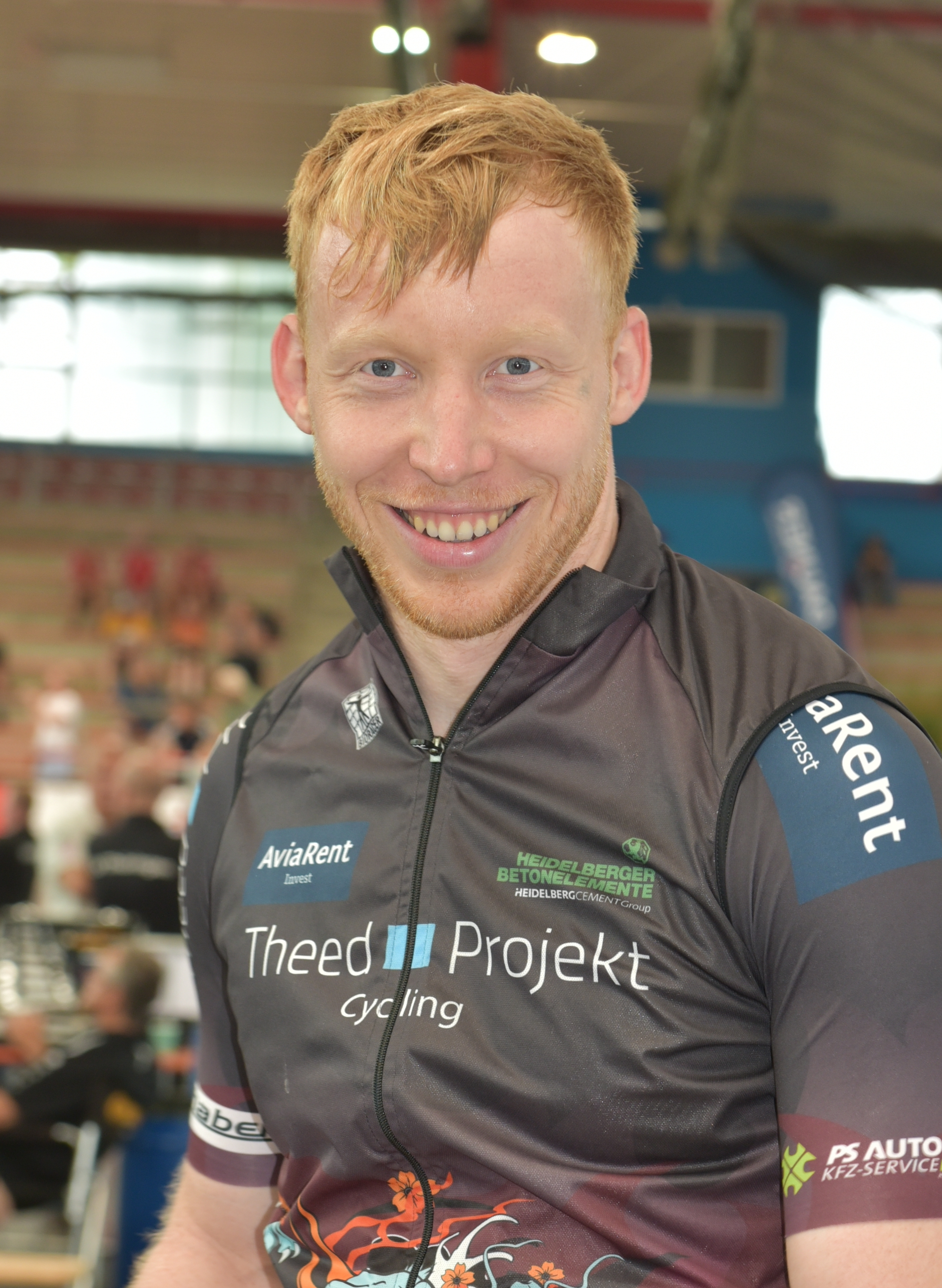
- Joachim Eilers in 2022

Personal information
- Born: 2 April 1990 (age 36) Cologne, West Germany
- Height: 185 cm (6 ft 1 in)
- Weight: 90 kg (198 lb)

Cycling career
- Sport: Cycling
- Discipline: Track
- Role: Rider
Medal record
Men's track cycling
Representing Germany
World Championships
Gold medal – first place	2016 London	1km time trial
Gold medal – first place	2016 London	Keirin
Silver medal – second place	2014 Cali	1km time trial
Silver medal – second place	2015 Yvelines	1km time trial
Bronze medal – third place	2013 Minsk	1km time trial
Bronze medal – third place	2015 Yvelines	Team sprint
Bronze medal – third place	2016 London	Team sprint
Bronze medal – third place	2021 Roubaix	Team sprint
Bronze medal – third place	2021 Roubaix	1 km time trial
European Championships
Gold medal – first place	2012 Panevėžys	Team sprint
Gold medal – first place	2014 Guadeloupe	Team sprint
Gold medal – first place	2014 Guadeloupe	Keirin
Silver medal – second place	2012 Panevėžys	Keirin
Silver medal – second place	2014 Guadeloupe	1km time trial
Silver medal – second place	2015 Grenchen	1km time trial
Silver medal – second place	2017 Berlin	Team sprint
Silver medal – second place	2017 Berlin	1 km time trial
Silver medal – second place	2018 Glasgow	1 km time trial
Bronze medal – third place	2015 Grenchen	Team sprint
Bronze medal – third place	2018 Glasgow	Team sprint
Bronze medal – third place	2021 Grenchen	Keirin

Joachim Eilers (born 2 April 1990) is a German professional racing cyclist. He rode at the 2015 UCI Track Cycling World Championships. At the 2016 UCI Track Cycling World Championships he won gold in the 1 km time trial. He competed for Germany at the 2016 Summer Olympics where he finished 5th in the men's sprint event and 4th in the men's keirin event.

== Major results ==
UCI Track Cycling World Championships

1st Keirin
1st 1km Time Trial
1st Sprinters Omnium, London Six Day.
