= Quentin Lafargue =

French cyclist (born 1990)

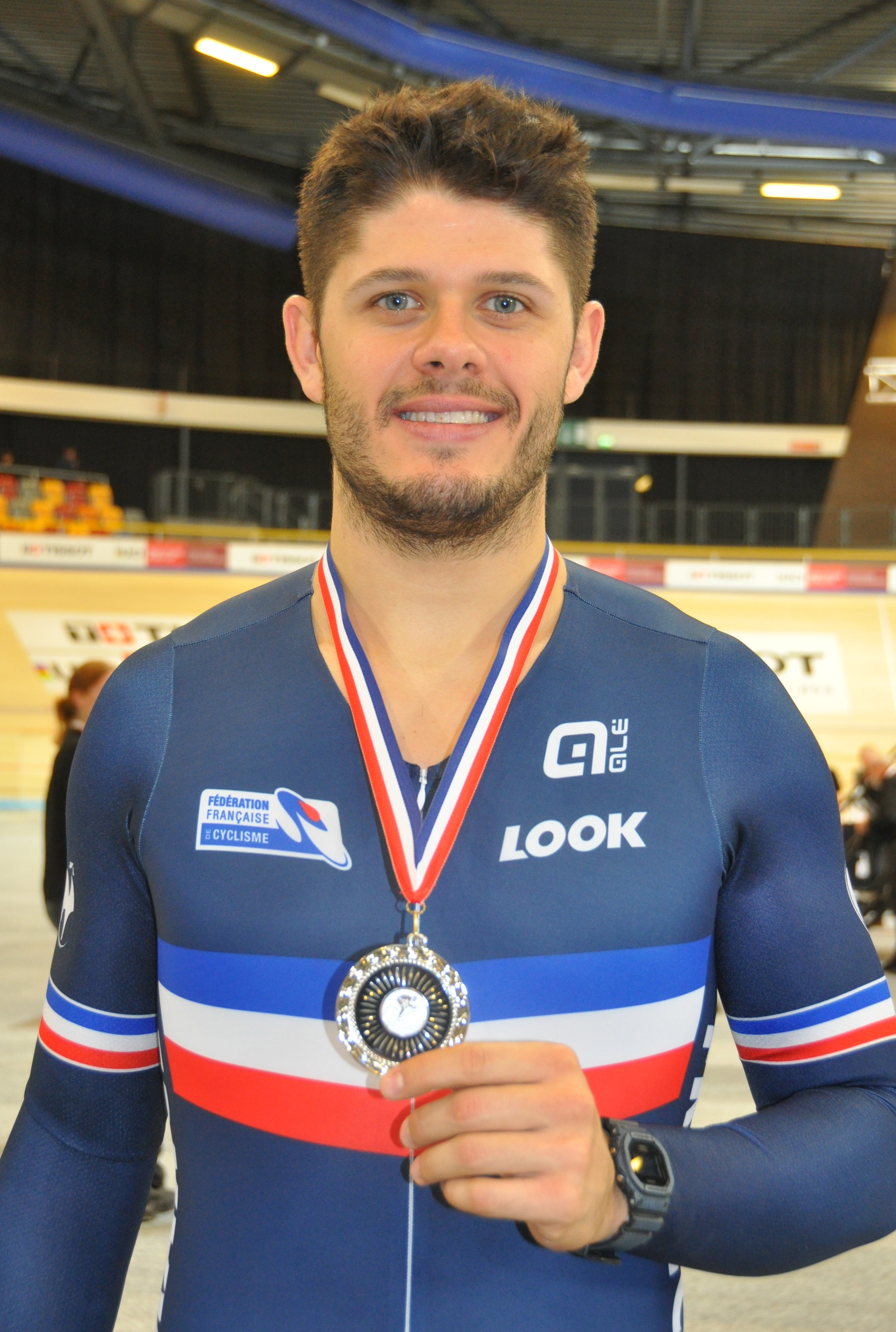
- Quentin Lafargue in 2016

Personal information
- Born: 17 November 1990 (age 35) Mazères, France
- Height: 1.83 m (6 ft 0 in)
- Weight: 93 kg (205 lb)

Cycling career
- Sport: Cycling
- Discipline: Track cycling
- Role: Rider
Medal record
Men's track cycling
Representing France
World Championships
Gold medal – first place	2019 Pruszków	1 km time trial
Silver medal – second place	2017 Hong Kong	1 km time trial
Silver medal – second place	2019 Pruszków	Team sprint
Silver medal – second place	2020 Berlin	1 km time trial
Bronze medal – third place	2015 Yvelines	Sprint
Bronze medal – third place	2016 London	1 km time trial
Bronze medal – third place	2017 Hong Kong	Team sprint
Bronze medal – third place	2018 Apeldoorn	Team sprint
European Games
Silver medal – second place	2019 Minsk	Team sprint
European Championships
Gold medal – first place	2016 Yvelines	1 km time trial
Gold medal – first place	2017 Berlin	Team sprint
Gold medal – first place	2019 Apeldoorn	1 km time trial
Gold medal – first place	2022 Munich	Team pursuit
Silver medal – second place	2018 Glasgow	Team sprint
Bronze medal – third place	2014 Baie-Mahault	1 km time trial
Bronze medal – third place	2017 Berlin	1 km time trial
Bronze medal – third place	2019 Apeldoorn	Team sprint
Bronze medal – third place	2023 Grenchen	Team pursuit

Quentin Lafargue (born 17 November 1990) is a French professional track cyclist. He rode at the 2015 UCI Track Cycling World Championships.
