= Yauhen Veramchuk =

Belarusian cyclist

Personal information
- Born: 3 September 1995 (age 31)

Cycling career
- Sport: Cycling
- Discipline: Track cycling

Yauhen Veramchuk (born 3 September 1995) is a Belarusian male track cyclist, representing Belarus at international competitions. He competed at the 2016 UEC European Track Championships in the team sprint event.
