= Denis Dmitriev =

Russian cyclist (born 1986)

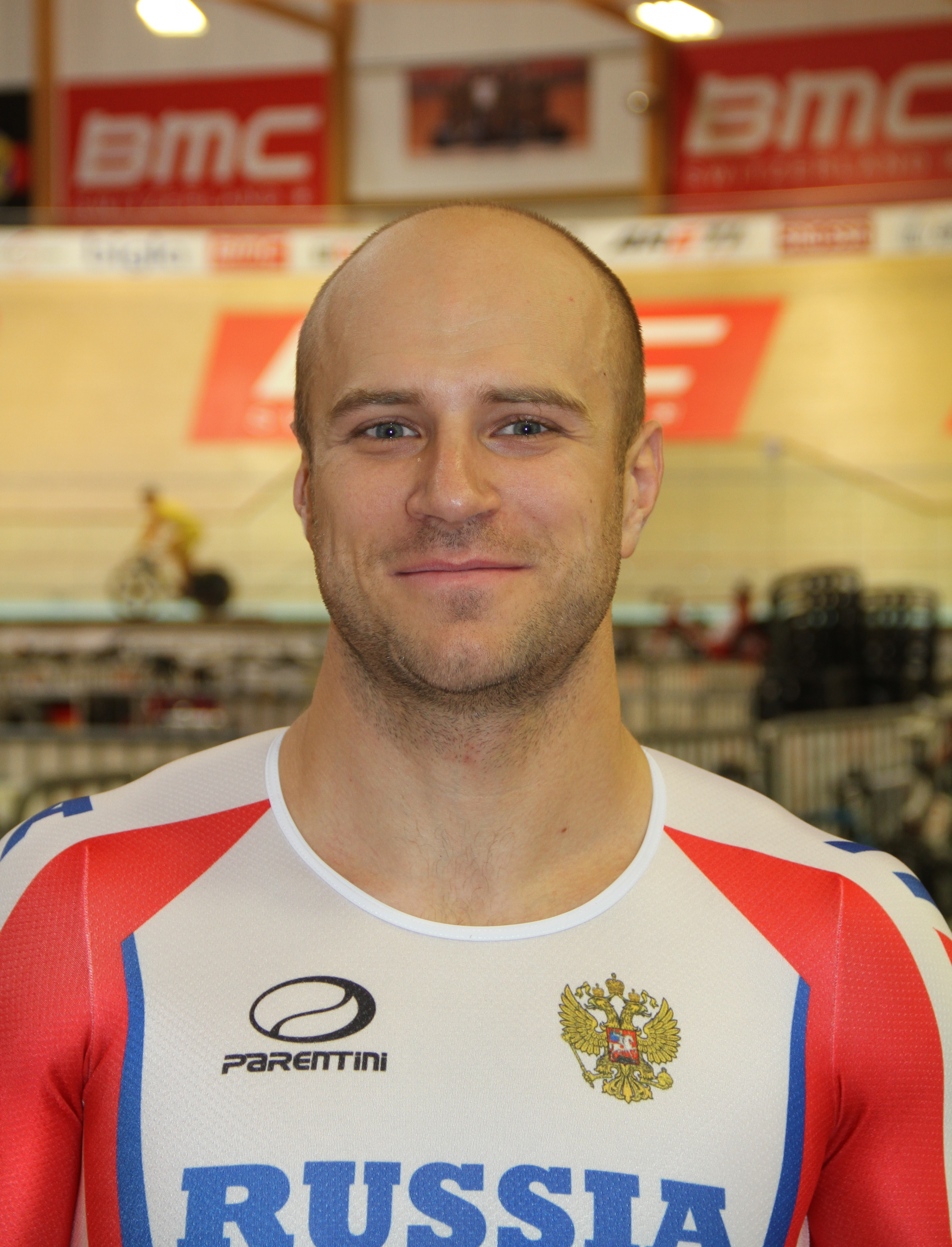
- Dmitriev in 2015

Personal information
- Full name: Denis Sergeyevich Dmitriev
- Born: 23 March 1986 (age 40) Tyrnovo, Pronsky District, Ryazan Oblast, Soviet Union
- Height: 1.77 m (5 ft 10 in)
- Weight: 90 kg (198 lb)

Cycling career
- Sport: Cycling
- Current team: Dynamo Moscow
- Discipline: Track
- Role: Rider
Medal record
Men's track cycling
Representing Russia
Olympic Games
Bronze medal – third place	2016 Rio de Janeiro	Sprint
World Championships
Gold medal – first place	2017 Hong Kong	Sprint
Silver medal – second place	2013 Minsk	Sprint
Silver medal – second place	2015 Yvelines	Sprint
Bronze medal – third place	2014 Cali	Sprint
Bronze medal – third place	2016 London	Sprint
Bronze medal – third place	2019 Pruszków	Team sprint
European Games
Bronze medal – third place	2019 Minsk	Sprint
Bronze medal – third place	2019 Minsk	Keirin
European Championships
Gold medal – first place	2010 Pruszków	Sprint
Gold medal – first place	2012 Panevėžys	Sprint
Gold medal – first place	2013 Apeldoorn	Sprint
Gold medal – first place	2020 Plovdiv	Team sprint
Silver medal – second place	2019 Apeldoorn	Keirin
Silver medal – second place	2020 Plovdiv	Sprint
Silver medal – second place	2020 Plovdiv	Keirin
Bronze medal – third place	2011 Apeldoorn	Sprint
Bronze medal – third place	2012 Panevėžys	Keirin
Bronze medal – third place	2013 Apeldoorn	Team sprint
Bronze medal – third place	2014 Guadeloupe	Team sprint
Bronze medal – third place	2014 Guadeloupe	Keirin
Bronze medal – third place	2015 Grenchen	Keirin
Bronze medal – third place	2017 Berlin	Sprint
Junior World Championships
Silver medal – second place	2003 Moscow	Team sprint
U23 & Junior European Championships
Gold medal – first place	2004 Valencia	Junior Team sprint
Gold medal – first place	2008 Pruszków	U23 Team sprint
Silver medal – second place	2003 Moscow	Junior Team sprint
Bronze medal – third place	2006 Athens	U23 Team sprint

Denis Sergeyevich Dmitriev (Russian: Денис Сергеевич Дмитриев; born 23 March 1986) is a Russian track cyclist. Specialising in the sprint events, Dmitriev's best result in international sports was winning a gold medal at the 2017 World Championships in Hong Kong. At the 2016 Summer Olympics, he succeeded to the bronze medal race in sprint, winning the medal. Dmitriev is a four-time European Champion at senior level in the Sprint event for men, and the most successful sprint cyclist in the competitions's history.

== Major results ==
2003
2003 UCI Juniors Track World Championships

2nd Team Sprint

2003 European Junior Track Championships

2nd Team Sprint

2004
2004 European Junior Track Championships

1st Team sprint,

2006
2006 European under-23 Track Championships

3rd Team Sprint,

2008
2008 European under-23 Track Championships

1st Team sprint

2010
2010 UEC European Track Championships

1st Sprint,

2011
2011 UEC European Track Championships

3rd Sprint

2011 Russian National Championship,

1st Keirin
1st Team Sprint
1st Sprint

2012
2012 UEC European Track Championships

1st Sprint
3rd Keirin

2013
2013 UCI Track Cycling World Championships

2nd Sprint

2013 UEC European Track Championships

1st Sprint
3rd Team Sprint

2013 Russian National Championship

1st Keirin
1st Sprint
2nd Team Sprint

2014
2014 UCI Track Cycling World Championships

3rd Sprint

2014 UEC European Track Championships

3rd Team Sprint
3rd Keirin

2015
2015 UCI Track Cycling World Championships

3rd Keirin
2nd Sprint

2016
2016 UCI Track Cycling World Championships

2nd Sprint

2017
2017 UCI Track Cycling World Championships

1st Sprint

2017 UEC European Track Championships

3rd Sprint

2018
2018 Russian National Championship,

1st Sprint
1st Team Sprint

2019
2019 UCI Track Cycling World Championships

3rd Team Sprint

2019 European Games

3rd Keirin
3rd Sprint

2019 UEC European Track Championships

2nd Keirin

2020
2020 UEC European Track Championships

1st Sprint
2nd Keirin
2nd Sprint

== See also ==
- List of European Championship medalists in men's sprint
