= Pavel Yakushevskiy =

Russian cyclist (born 1987)

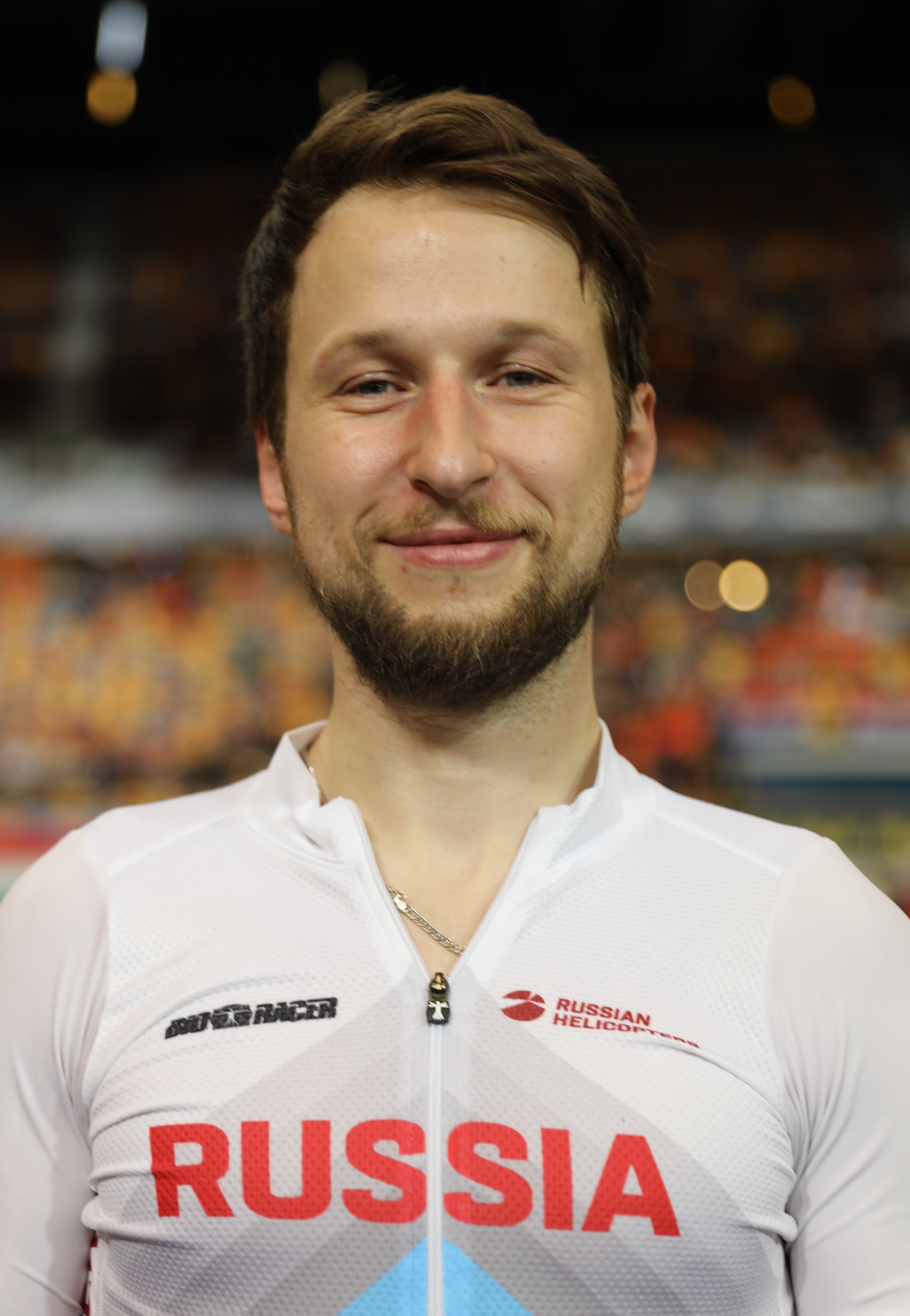
- Yakushevskiy at the 2019 UEC European Track Championships

Personal information
- Full name: Pavel Andreyevich Yakushevskiy
- Born: 24 September 1987 (age 39) Moscow, Soviet Union
- Height: 1.73 m (5 ft 8 in)
- Weight: 74 kg (163 lb)

Cycling career
- Sport: Cycling
- Discipline: Track cycling
- Role: Rider
Medal record
Men's track cycling
Representing Russia
World Championships
Bronze medal – third place	2019 Pruszków	Team sprint
European Championships
Gold medal – first place	2016 Yvelines	Sprint
Gold medal – first place	2020 Plovdiv	Team sprint
Bronze medal – third place	2013 Apeldoorn	Team sprint
Bronze medal – third place	2014 Baie-Mahault	Team sprint
U23 & Junior European Championships
Gold medal – first place	2008 Pruszków	U23 Team sprint

Pavel Andreyevich Yakushevskiy (Russian: Павел Андреевич Якушевский; born 24 September 1987) is a Russian professional racing cyclist. He rode at the 2015 UCI Track Cycling World Championships. He graduated from Lesgaft National State University of Physical Education, Sport and Health.

== See also ==
- List of European Championship medalists in men's sprint
