= Pavel Kelemen =

Czech cyclist (born 1991)

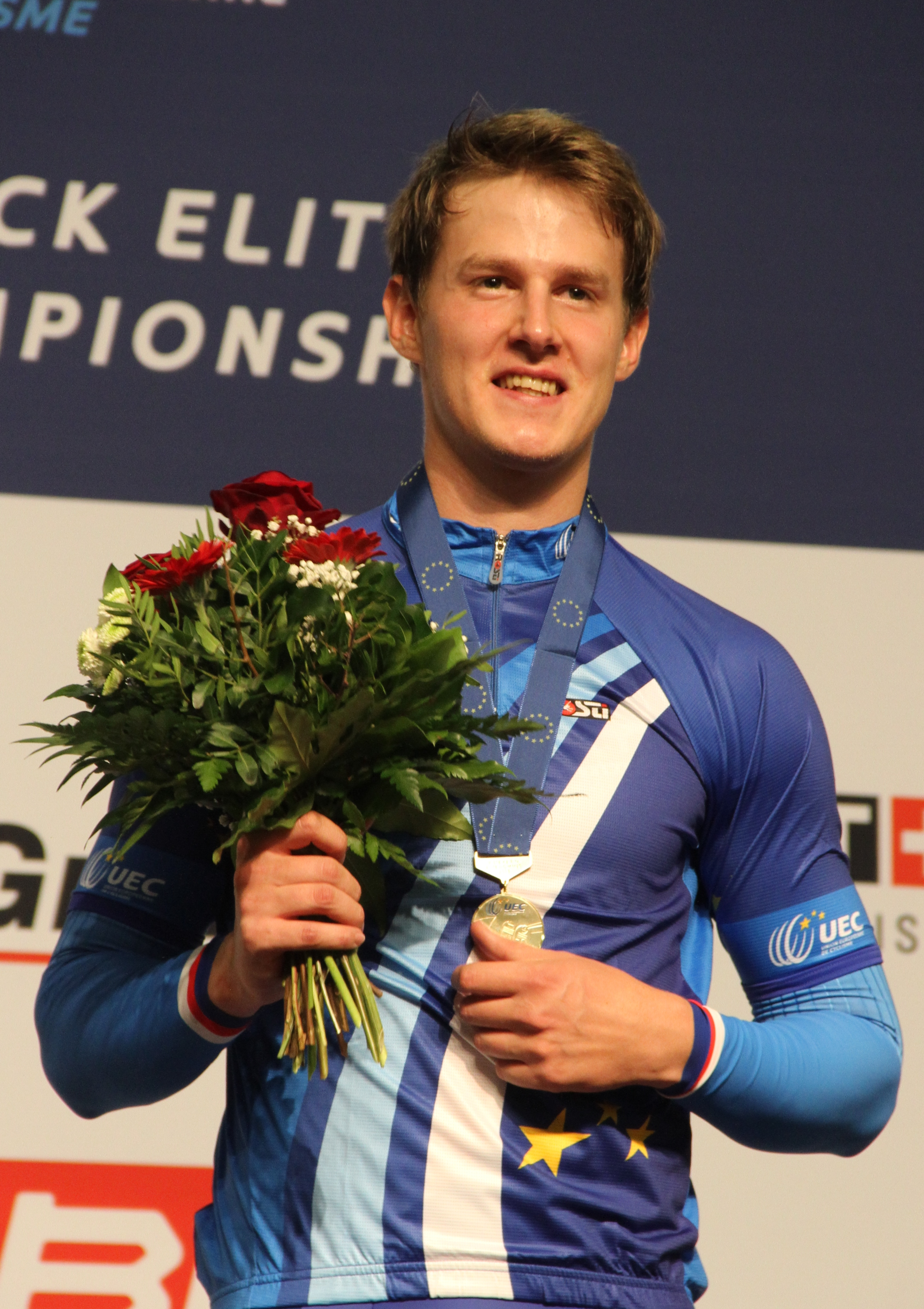
- Kelemen won gold at the 2015 UEC European Track Championships

Personal information
- Born: 28 May 1991 (age 35) Domažlice, Czech Republic
- Height: 1.87 m (6 ft 2 in)
- Weight: 78 kg (172 lb)

Cycling career
- Sport: Cycling
- Current team: ATT Investments
- Disciplines: Track; Road
- Role: Rider

Amateur team
- 2021: Team Dukla Praha

Professional teams
- 2022: AC Sparta Praha
- 2023–: ATT Investments

Pavel Kelemen (born 28 May 1991) is a Czech racing cyclist who currently rides for UCI Continental team ATT Investments.

In 2011 Pavel Kelemen was part of the Czech team sprint team at the European Championships in Apeldoorn, together with Denis Špička and Filip Ditzel. The team finished in 8th.

In 2012, Kelemen was nominated by his federation to take part in the London Olympics for the Men's sprint competition. He competed in the same event at the 2016 Summer Olympics, alongside the men's keirin event.

In 2015, he won the men's keirin event at the European Track Cycling Championships.

== Major results ==
=== Road ===
2021
9th Grand Prix Poland
2023
1st Velká Bíteš-Brno-Velká Bíteš
8th Umag Trophy

=== Track ===
Men's Sprint History
Games	Age	City	Sport	Country	Phase	Unit	Rank	Time
2012 Summer	21	London	Cycling	Czech Republic	Final Round	Heat 9-12	2	
2012 Summer	21	London	Cycling	Czech Republic	Round Two	Heat Six	2	
2012 Summer	21	London	Cycling	Czech Republic	Round Two	Heat One	2	
2012 Summer	21	London	Cycling	Czech Republic	Round One	Heat Six	1	10.840
2012 Summer	21	London	Cycling	Czech Republic	Qualifying Round		13	10.311

Results
Games	Age	City	Sport	Event	Team	NOC	Rank	Medal
2012 Summer	21	London	Cycling	Men's Sprint	Czech Republic	CZE	10	
2016 Summer	25	Rio de Janeiro	Cycling	Men's Sprint	Czech Republic	CZE	17	
2016 Summer	25	Rio de Janeiro	Cycling	Men's Keirin	Czech Republic	CZE	21st	
