= Robin Wagner (cyclist) =

Czech cyclist (born 1993)

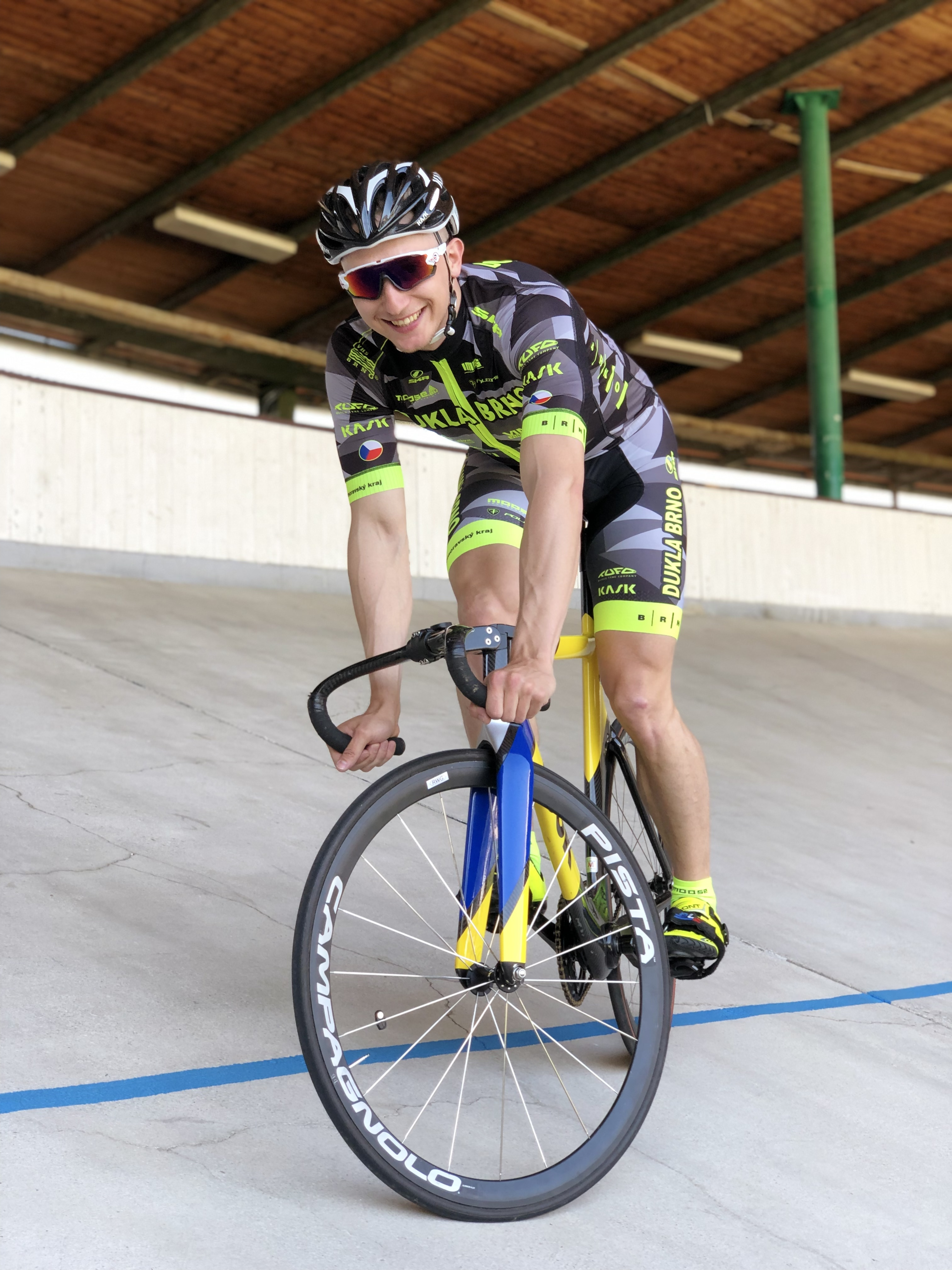
- Wagner at his home Brno Velodrome

Personal information
- Born: 8 February 1993 (age 33) Zábřeh, Czech Republic

Cycling career
- Sport: Cycling
- Role: Rider

Robin Wagner (born 8 February 1993) is a Czech professional racing cyclist. He rode at the 2015 UCI Track Cycling World Championships.
