= 2011 UCI Track Cycling World Championships – Men's sprint =

Men's sprint at the 2011 UCI Track Cycling World Championships
- Venue: Omnisport Apeldoorn, Apeldoorn
- Date: 24–25 March 2011
- Competitors: 50 from 21 nations

Medalists
gold medal	Jason Kenny	Great Britain
silver medal	Chris Hoy	Great Britain
bronze medal	Mickaël Bourgain	France

Rainbow jersey

The Men's sprint at the 2011 UCI Track Cycling World Championships was held on March 24 and 25. The qualifying, first round, second round, second round repechages and quarterfinals took place on 24 March. The Semifinals and Finals took place on 25 March.

In January 2012, Grégory Baugé was stripped of his world title, following the nullification of his 2011 results after a 12-month backdated ban for drug test infringements.

== Format ==
50 athletes participated in the contest. After the qualifying heats, the fastest 24 riders advanced to the 1/16 finals.

The first rider in each of the 12 heats advanced to the second round. There was no repechage for this round.

The first rider from each of the six Second Round heats advanced to the Quarterfinals and the second placed riders advanced to a repechage to determine the other two riders that competed the quarterfinals.

The first rider in each quarterfinal advanced to the semifinals and the 4 losing athletes raced for 5th-8th place.

== Results ==
=== Qualifying ===
The Qualifying was held at 14:15.

Rank	Name	Nation	Time	Notes
1	Mickaël Bourgain	France	10.043	Q
2	Chris Hoy	United Kingdom	10.111	Q
3	Jason Kenny	United Kingdom	10.120	Q
4	Grégory Baugé	France	10.142	Q
5	Michaël D'Almeida	France	10.148	Q
6	Shane Perkins	Australia	10.172	Q
7	Kévin Sireau	France	10.219	Q
8	Scott Sunderland	Australia	10.262	Q
9	Robert Förstemann	Germany	10.267	Q
10	Matthew Crampton	United Kingdom	10.274	Q
11	Matthew Glaetzer	Australia	10.295	Q
12	Sam Webster	New Zealand	10.344	Q
13	Tsubasa Kitatsuru	Japan	10.353	Q
14	Stefan Bötticher	Germany	10.357	Q
15	Damian Zieliński	Poland	10.360	Q
16	Sebastian Döhrer	Germany	10.370	Q
17	Edward Dawkins	New Zealand	10.391	Q
18	Zhang Miao	China	10.417	Q
19	Kazunari Watanabe	Japan	10.441	Q
20	Roy van den Berg	Netherlands	10.462	Q
21	Denis Dmitriev	Russia	10.489	Q
22	Andrey Kubeev	Russia	10.534	Q
23	Bernard Esterhuizen	South Africa	10.538	Q
24	Zhang Lei	China	10.552	Q
25	Juan Peralta Gascon	Spain	10.564	
26	Denis Špička	Czech Republic	10.569	
27	Giddeon Massie	United States	10.576	
28	Kazuki Amagai	Japan	10.580	
29	Christian Tamayo	Colombia	10.591	
30	Hersony Canelón	Venezuela	10.593	
31	Pavel Yakushevskiy	Russia	10.606	
32	Sergey Borisov	Russia	10.638	
33	Tomáš Bábek	Czech Republic	10.650	
34	Zafeirios Volikakis	Greece	10.691	
35	Adam Ptáčník	Czech Republic	10.698	
36	Scott Mulder	Canada	10.708	
37	Yudai Nitta	Japan	10.710	
38	Konstantinos Christodoulou	Greece	10.719	
39	Adrian Tekliński	Poland	10.725	
40	Bao Saifei	China	10.750	
41	Matthijs Büchli	Netherlands	10.779	
42	Hodei Mazquiaran Uria	Spain	10.786	
43	Francesco Ceci	Italy	10.805	
44	Maciej Bielecki	Poland	10.809	
45	Christos Volikakis	Greece	10.810	
46	Itmar Esteban Herraiz	Spain	10.819	
47	Muhammad Md	Malaysia	10.942	
48	Muhd Amran	Malaysia	11.062	
49	Kristjan Gregoric	Slovenia	11.446	
50	Omar Bertazzo	Italy	11.610	

=== 1/16 Finals ===
1/16 Finals were held at 16:55.

Heat	Rank	Name	Nation	Time	Notes
1	1	Mickaël Bourgain	France	10.574	Q
1	2	Zhang Lei	China		
2	1	Chris Hoy	United Kingdom	10.713	Q
2	2	Bernard Esterhuizen	South Africa		
3	1	Jason Kenny	United Kingdom	10.763	Q
3	2	Andrey Kubeev	Russia		
4	1	Grégory Baugé	France	10.839	Q
4	2	Denis Dmitriev	Russia		
5	1	Michaël D'Almeida	France	10.742	Q
5	2	Roy van den Berg	Netherlands		
6	1	Shane Perkins	Australia	10.541	Q
6	2	Kazunari Watanabe	Japan		
7	1	Kévin Sireau	France	11.136	Q
7	2	Zhang Miao	China		
8	1	Scott Sunderland	Australia	10.666	Q
8	2	Edward Dawkins	New Zealand		
9	1	Robert Förstemann	Germany	11.426	Q
9	2	Sebastian Döhrer	Germany		
10	1	Matthew Crampton	United Kingdom	10.667	Q
10	2	Damian Zieliński	Poland		
11	1	Matthew Glaetzer	Australia	10.973	Q
11	2	Stefan Bötticher	Germany		
12	1	Tsubasa Kitatsuru	Japan	10.964	Q
12	2	Sam Webster	New Zealand		

=== 1/8 Finals ===
1/8 Finals were held at 19:30.

Heat	Rank	Name	Nation	Time	Notes
1	1	Mickaël Bourgain	France	10.649	Q
1	2	Tsubasa Kitatsuru	Japan		
2	1	Chris Hoy	United Kingdom	10.660	Q
2	2	Matthew Glaetzer	Australia		
3	1	Jason Kenny	United Kingdom	10.652	Q
3	2	Matthew Crampton	United Kingdom		
4	1	Grégory Baugé	France	10.908	Q
4	2	Robert Förstemann	Germany		
5	1	Scott Sunderland	Australia	10.977	Q
5	2	Michaël D'Almeida	France		
6	1	Shane Perkins	Australia	10.458	Q
6	2	Kévin Sireau	France		

=== 1/8 Finals Repechage ===
1/8 Finals Repechage was held at 20:10.

Heat	Rank	Name	Nation	Time	Notes
1	1	Robert Förstemann	Germany	10.998	Q
1	2	Kévin Sireau	France		
1	3	Tsubasa Kitatsuru	Japan		
2	1	Michaël D'Almeida	France	10.817	Q
2	2	Matthew Glaetzer	Australia		
2	3	Matthew Crampton	United Kingdom		

=== Quarterfinals ===
The Quarterfinals were held at 20:30, 20:55 and 21:20.

Heat	Rank	Name	Nation	Race 1	Race 2	Decider	Notes
1	1	Mickaël Bourgain	France	10.567	10.972		Q
1	2	Michaël D'Almeida	France				
2	1	Chris Hoy	United Kingdom	10.755	10.488		Q
2	2	Robert Förstemann	Germany				
3	1	Jason Kenny	United Kingdom	10.437		10.571	Q
3	2	Shane Perkins	Australia		10.569		
4	1	Grégory Baugé	France	10.538	10.672		Q
4	2	Scott Sunderland	Australia				

=== Race for 5th-8th Places ===
The Race for 5th-8th Places was held at 21:50.

Rank	Name	Nation	Time
5	Michaël D'Almeida	France	10.967
6	Shane Perkins	Australia	
7	Scott Sunderland	Australia	
8	Robert Förstemann	Germany	REL

=== Semifinals ===
The semifinals were held at 18:50 and 19:05.

Heat	Rank	Name	Nation	Race 1	Race 2	Decider	Notes
1	1	Grégory Baugé	France	10.510	10.608		Q
1	2	Mickaël Bourgain	France				
2	1	Jason Kenny	United Kingdom	10.378	10.500		Q
2	2	Chris Hoy	United Kingdom				

=== Finals ===
The finals were held at 20:45, 21:15 and 21:40.

Rank	Name	Nation	Race 1	Race 2	Decider
Gold Medal Races
DSQ	Grégory Baugé	France	10.224	10.220	
1st place, gold medalist(s)	Jason Kenny	United Kingdom			
Bronze Medal Races
2nd place, silver medalist(s)	Chris Hoy	United Kingdom		10.442	10.652
3rd place, bronze medalist(s)	Mickaël Bourgain	France	10.616		

== See also ==
- 2011 UCI Para-cycling Track World Championships – Men's sprint
