= 2009 UCI Track Cycling World Championships – Men's sprint =

Track cycling event

Men's sprint at the 2009 UCI Track Cycling World Championships
- Venue: BGŻ Arena, Pruszków
- Date: 28–29 March 2009
- Competitors: 44 from 19 nations

Medalists
gold medal	Grégory Baugé	France
silver medal	Azizulhasni Awang	Malaysia
bronze medal	Kévin Sireau	France

The Men's sprint event of the 2009 UCI Track Cycling World Championships was held on 28 and 29 March 2009.

== Results ==
=== Qualifying (200 m time trial) ===
Rank	Name	Nation	100m	Time	Speed (km/h)	Notes
1	Grégory Baugé	France	4.894 (1)	9.930	72.507	Q
2	Jason Kenny	United Kingdom	4.989 (4)	10.002	71.985	Q
3	Kévin Sireau	France	4.952 (2)	10.010	71.928	Q
4	Mickaël Bourgain	France	4.963 (3)	10.040	71.713	Q
5	Shane Perkins	Australia	4.994 (5)	10.074	71.471	Q
6	Matthew Crampton	United Kingdom	4.998 (6)	10.105	71.251	Q
7	Lei Zhang	China	5.011 (7)	10.116	71.174	Q
8	Maximilian Levy	Germany	5.040 (8)	10.175	70.761	Q
9	Michaël D'Almeida	France	5.042 (9)	10.184	70.699	Q
10	Stefan Nimke	Germany	5.056 (12)	10.198	70.602	Q
11	Ross Edgar	United Kingdom	5.052 (10)	10.202	70.574	Q
12	Azizulhasni Awang	Malaysia	5.099 (15)	10.210	70.519	Q
13	Mohd Rizal Tisin	Malaysia	5.094 (13)	10.232	70.367	Q
14	Robert Förstemann	Germany	5.054 (11)	10.270	70.107	Q
14	Łukasz Kwiatkowski	Poland	5.097 (14)	10.270	70.107	Q
16	Teun Mulder	Netherlands	5.100 (16)	10.294	69.943	Q
17	Scott Sunderland	Australia	5.102 (17)	10.314	69.808	Q
18	Andrii Vynokurov	Ukraine	5.135 (18)	10.407	69.184	Q
19	Josiah Ng Onn Lam	Malaysia	5.164 (22)	10.439	68.972	Q
20	Valentin Savitskiy	Russia	5.158 (19)	10.453	68.879	Q
21	Christos Volikakis	Greece	5.179 (24)	10.464	68.807	Q
22	Kazunari Watanabe	Japan	5.162 (21)	10.488	68.649	Q
23	Daniel Ellis	Australia	5.159 (20)	10.489	68.643	Q
24	Zhang Miao	China	5.213 (28)	10.496	68.597	Q
25	Denis Dmitriev	Russia	5.171 (23)	10.513	68.486	
26	Jason Niblett	Australia	5.190 (25)	10.534	68.35	
27	Adam Ptáčník	Czech Republic	5.210 (27)	10.565	68.149	
28	Sergey Ruban	Russia	5.238 (30)	10.584	68.027	
29	Christopher Sellier	Trinidad and Tobago	5.234 (29)	10.601	67.918	
30	Travis Smith	Canada	5.197 (26)	10.603	67.905	
31	Leonardo Narváez	Colombia	5.251 (32)	10.608	67.873	
32	Wen Hao Li	China	5.254 (33)	10.644	67.643	
33	Edward Dawkins	New Zealand	5.282 (35)	10.654	67.58	
34	Tomáš Bábek	Czech Republic	5.248 (31)	10.658	67.554	
35	Simon Van Velthooven	New Zealand	5.296 (38)	10.666	67.504	
36	Filip Ditzel	Czech Republic	5.287 (36)	10.709	67.233	
37	Alfredo Moreno Cano	Spain	5.270 (34)	10.728	67.114	
38	Clemens Selzer	Austria	5.300 (39)	10.747	66.995	
39	Hernán Sánchez	Colombia	5.290 (37)	10.805	66.635	
40	Jonathan Marín	Colombia	5.330 (41)	10.826	66.506	
41	Kazuya Narita	Japan	5.307 (40)	10.829	66.488	
42	Juan Peralta Gascon	Spain	5.336 (42)	10.837	66.439	
43	Yondi Schmidt	Netherlands	5.353 (43)	10.869	66.243	
44	Itmar Esteban Herraiz	Spain	5.457 (44)	11.141	64.626	

=== 1/16 finals ===
Heat	Rank	Name	Nation	Time	Speed (km/h)	Notes
1	1	Grégory Baugé	France	10.959	65.699	Q
1	2	Zhang Miao	China			
2	1	Jason Kenny	United Kingdom	64.894	11.095	Q
2	2	Daniel Ellis	Australia			
3	1	Kévin Sireau	France	65.783	10.945	Q
3	2	Kazunari Watanabe	Japan			
4	1	Mickaël Bourgain	France	68.571	10.5	Q
4	2	Christos Volikakis	Greece			
5	1	Shane Perkins	Australia	65.795	10.943	Q
5	2	Valentin Savitskiy	Russia			
6	1	Matthew Crampton	United Kingdom	67.828	10.615	Q
6	2	Josiah Ng Onn Lam	Malaysia			
7	1	Lei Zhang	China	68.337	10.536	Q
7	2	Andrii Vynokurov	Ukraine			
8	1	Maximilian Levy	Germany	64.643	11.138	Q
8	2	Scott Sunderland	Australia			
9	1	Michaël D'Almeida	France	67.014	10.744	Q
9	2	Teun Mulder	Netherlands			
10	1	Stefan Nimke	Germany	67.057	10.737	Q
10	2	Robert Förstemann	Germany			
11	1	Ross Edgar	United Kingdom	67.472	10.671	Q
11	2	Łukasz Kwiatkowski	Poland			
12	1	Azizulhasni Awang	Malaysia	64.475	11.167	Q
12	2	Mohd Rizal Tisin	Malaysia			

=== 1/8 finals ===
Heat	Rank	Name	Nation	Time	Speed (km/h)	Notes
1	1	Azizulhasni Awang	Malaysia	10.535	68.343	Q
1	2	Grégory Baugé	France			
2	1	Jason Kenny	United Kingdom	69.19	10.406	Q
2	2	Ross Edgar	United Kingdom			
3	1	Kévin Sireau	France	67.783	10.622	Q
3	2	Stefan Nimke	Germany			
4	1	Mickaël Bourgain	France	66.747	10.787	Q
4	2	Michaël D'Almeida	France			
5	1	Shane Perkins	Australia	67.089	10.732	Q
5	2	Maximilian Levy	Germany			
6	1	Matthew Crampton	United Kingdom	67.126	10.726	Q
6	2	Lei Zhang	China			

=== 1/8 finals repechage ===
Heat	Rank	Name	Nation	Time	Speed (km/h)	Notes
1	1	Grégory Baugé	France	10.371	69.424	Q
1	2	Michaël D'Almeida	France			
1	3	Lei Zhang	China			
2	1	Ross Edgar	United Kingdom	10.839	66.426	Q
2	2	Stefan Nimke	Germany			
2	3	Maximilian Levy	Germany			

=== Quarter finals ===
Heat	Rank	Name	Nation	1st run	2nd run	3rd run	Notes
1	1	Azizulhasni Awang	Malaysia	10.406		10.871	Q
1	2	Ross Edgar	United Kingdom		10.995		
2	1	Grégory Baugé	France	10.353	10.664		Q
2	2	Jason Kenny	United Kingdom				
3	1	Kévin Sireau	France	10.487	10.506		Q
3	2	Matthew Crampton	United Kingdom				
4	1	Shane Perkins	Australia	10.513	10.487		Q
4	2	Mickaël Bourgain	France				

=== Race for 5th-8th places ===
Rank	Name	Nation	Time	Speed (km/h)
5	Jason Kenny	United Kingdom	11.013	65.377
6	Matthew Crampton	United Kingdom		
7	Mickaël Bourgain	France		
8	Ross Edgar	United Kingdom		

=== Semi finals ===
Heat	Rank	Name	Nation	1st run	2nd run	3rd run	Notes
1	1	Azizulhasni Awang	Malaysia	10.480	10.680		Q
1	2	Shane Perkins	Australia				
2	1	Grégory Baugé	France	10.348	10.635		Q
2	2	Kévin Sireau	France				

=== Finals ===
Heat	Rank	Name	Nation	1st run	2nd run	3rd run
1	1	Kévin Sireau	France	10.443	10.316	
1	2	Shane Perkins	Australia			
2	1	Grégory Baugé	France	10.406		10.281
2	2	Azizulhasni Awang	Malaysia		10.499	

== Final classification ==
Rank	Name	Nation
1st place, gold medalist(s)	Grégory Baugé	France
2nd place, silver medalist(s)	Azizulhasni Awang	Malaysia
3rd place, bronze medalist(s)	Kévin Sireau	France
4	Shane Perkins	Australia
5	Jason Kenny	United Kingdom
6	Matthew Crampton	United Kingdom
7	Mickaël Bourgain	France
8	Ross Edgar	United Kingdom
9	Lei Zhang	China
10	Maximilian Levy	Germany
11	Michaël D'Almeida	France
12	Stefan Nimke	Germany
13	Mohd Rizal Tisin	Malaysia
14	Łukasz Kwiatkowski	Poland
15	Robert Förstemann	Germany
16	Teun Mulder	Netherlands
17	Scott Sunderland	Australia
18	Andrii Vynokurov	Ukraine
19	Josiah Ng Onn Lam	Malaysia
20	Valentin Savitskiy	Russia
21	Christos Volikakis	Greece
22	Kazunari Watanabe	Japan
23	Daniel Ellis	Australia
24	Zhang Miao	China
25	Denis Dmitriev	Russia
26	Jason Niblett	Australia
27	Adam Ptáčník	Czech Republic
28	Sergey Ruban	Russia
29	Christopher Sellier	Trinidad and Tobago
30	Travis Smith	Canada
31	Leonardo Narváez	Colombia
32	Wen Hao Li	China
33	Edward Dawkins	New Zealand
34	Tomáš Bábek	Czech Republic
35	Simon Van Velthooven	New Zealand
36	Filip Ditzel	Czech Republic
37	Alfredo Moreno Cano	Spain
38	Clemens Selzer	Austria
39	Hernán Sánchez	Colombia
40	Jonathan Marín	Colombia
41	Kazuya Narita	Japan
42	Juan Peralta Gascon	Spain
43	Yondi Schmidt	Netherlands
44	Itmar Esteban Herraiz	Spain
