= 2014 UEC European Track Championships – Men's keirin =

Men's keirin at the 2014 UEC European Track Championships
- UEC European Champion jersey
- Venue: Vélodrome Amédée Détraux, Baie-Mahault
- Date: 19 October
- Competitors: 28 from 17 nations

Medalists
gold medal	Joachim Eilers	Germany
silver medal	Matthijs Büchli	Netherlands
bronze medal	Denis Dmitriev	Russia

The Men's keirin was held on 19 October 2014.

== Results ==
=== First round ===
Top 2 in each heat qualified directly for the second round; the remainder went to the first round repechage.

==== Heat 1 ====
Rank	Name	Nation	Notes
1	Matthijs Büchli	Netherlands	Q
2	Callum Skinner	Great Britain	Q
3	Pavel Kelemen	Czech Republic	
4	Sotirios Bretas	Greece	
5	Andriy Vynokurov	Ukraine	
6	Francesco Ceci	Italy	
7	Eoin Mullen	Ireland	

==== Heat 3 ====
Rank	Name	Nation	Notes
1	Quentin Lafargue	France	Q
2	Tobias Wächter	Germany	Q
3	Mateusz Lipa	Poland	
4	Sandor Szalontay	Hungary	
5	Sergio Aliaga	Spain	
6	Jani Mikkonen	Finland	
7	Svajunas Jonauskas	Lithuania	

==== Heat 2 ====
Rank	Name	Nation	Notes
1	Joachim Eilers	Germany	Q
2	Hugo Haak	Netherlands	Q
3	Nikita Shurshin	Russia	
4	Adam Ptáčník	Czech Republic	
5	Matthew Crampton	Great Britain	
6	Uladzislau Novik	Belarus	
7	José Moreno Sánchez	Spain	

==== Heat 4 ====
Rank	Name	Nation	Notes
1	Denis Dmitriev	Russia	Q
2	Grégory Baugé	France	Q
3	Vasilijus Lendel	Lithuania	
4	Christos Volikakis	Greece	
5	Kamil Kuczyński	Poland	
6	Sergii Omelchenko	Azerbaijan	
7	Artsiom Zaitsau	Belarus	

=== First round Repechage ===
Heat winners qualified for the second round.

==== Heat 1 ====
Rank	Name	Nation	Notes
1	Christos Volikakis	Greece	Q
2	Uladzislau Novik	Belarus	
3	Pavel Kelemen	Czech Republic	
4	Sergio Aliaga	Spain	
5	Eoin Mullen	Ireland	

==== Heat 3 ====
Rank	Name	Nation	Notes
1	Mateusz Lipa	Poland	Q
2	Andriy Vynokurov	Ukraine	
3	Adam Ptáčník	Czech Republic	
4	Svajunas Jonauskas	Lithuania	
5	Sergii Omelchenko	Azerbaijan	

==== Heat 2 ====
Rank	Name	Nation	Notes
1	Nikita Shurshin	Russia	Q
2	Francesco Ceci	Italy	
3	Matthew Crampton	Great Britain	
4	Sandor Szalontay	Hungary	
5	Artsiom Zaitsau	Belarus	

==== Heat 4 ====
Rank	Name	Nation	Notes
1	Vasilijus Lendel	Lithuania	Q
2	Kamil Kuczyński	Poland	
3	Sotirios Bretas	Greece	
4	José Moreno Sánchez	Spain	
5	Jani Mikkonen	Finland	

=== Second round ===
First three riders in each semi qualified for the final; the remainder went to the small final (for places 7-12).

==== Semi-final 1 ====
Rank	Name	Nation	Notes
1	Denis Dmitriev	Russia	Q
2	Matthijs Büchli	Netherlands	Q
3	Vasilijus Lendel	Lithuania	Q
4	Tobias Wächter	Germany	
5	Hugo Haak	Netherlands	
6	Christos Volikakis	Greece	

==== Semi-final 2 ====
Rank	Name	Nation	Notes
1	Joachim Eilers	Germany	Q
2	Grégory Baugé	France	Q
3	Mateusz Lipa	Poland	Q
4	Quentin Lafargue	France	
5	Callum Skinner	Great Britain	
6	Nikita Shurshin	Russia	

=== Finals ===
The final classification is determined in the ranking finals.

==== Final (places 7-12) ====
Rank	Name	Nation	Notes
7	Nikita Shurshin	Russia	
8	Tobias Wächter	Germany	
9	Christos Volikakis	Greece	
10	Quentin Lafargue	France	
11	Hugo Haak	Netherlands	
12	Callum Skinner	Great Britain	

==== Final (places 1-6) ====
Rank	Name	Nation	Notes
1st place, gold medalist(s)	Joachim Eilers	Germany	
2nd place, silver medalist(s)	Matthijs Büchli	Netherlands	
3rd place, bronze medalist(s)	Denis Dmitriev	Russia	
4	Vasilijus Lendel	Lithuania	
5	Mateusz Lipa	Poland	
6	Grégory Baugé	France	
