= 2014 UCI Track Cycling World Championships – Men's sprint =

Men's sprint at the 2014 UCI Track Cycling World Championships
- Venue: Velódromo Alcides Nieto Patiño, Cali, Colombia
- Date: 1–2 March 2014
- Competitors: 30 from 16 nations

Medalists
gold medal	François Pervis	France
silver medal	Stefan Bötticher	Germany
bronze medal	Denis Dmitriev	Russia

The Men's sprint at the 2014 UCI Track Cycling World Championships was held on 1–2 March 2014. 32 cyclists participated in the contest.

== Results ==
=== Qualifying ===
The qualifying was held at 12:00.

Rank	Name	Nation	Time	Notes
1	François Pervis	France	9.742	Q
2	Stefan Bötticher	Germany	9.790	Q
3	Robert Förstemann	Germany	9.852	Q
4	Denis Dmitriev	Russia	9.892	Q
5	Max Niederlag	Germany	9.923	Q
6	Shane Perkins	Australia	9.925	Q
7	Jeffrey Hoogland	Netherlands	9.927	Q
8	Matthew Crampton	Great Britain	9.931	Q
9	Sam Webster	New Zealand	9.933	Q
10	Matthew Glaetzer	Australia	9.937	Q
11	Michaël D'Almeida	France	9.972	Q
12	Matt Archibald	New Zealand	9.989	Q
13	Juan Peralta	Spain	9.990	Q
14	Jason Kenny	Great Britain	10.001	Q
15	Daniel Ellis	Australia	10.002	Q
16	Nikita Shurshin	Russia	10.028	Q
17	Pavel Kelemen	Czech Republic	10.030	Q
18	Damian Zieliński	Poland	10.063	Q
19	Azizulhasni Awang	Malaysia	10.066	Q
20	Bernard Esterhuizen	South Africa	10.098	Q
21	Xu Chao	China	10.156	Q
22	Seiichiro Nakagawa	Japan	10.161	Q
23	Adam Ptáčník	Czech Republic	10.167	Q
24	Kamil Kuczyński	Poland	10.181	Q
25	Christos Volikakis	Greece	10.214	
26	Hugo Haak	Netherlands	10.265	
27	Tomoyuki Kawabata	Japan	10.302	
28	Valentin Savitskiy	Russia	10.316	
29	Hugo Barrette	Canada	10.359	
30	José Moreno	Spain	10.465	
	Fabián Puerta	Colombia		DNS
	Hersony Canelón	Venezuela		DNS

=== 1/16 finals ===
The 1/16 finals were held at 13:05.

Heat	Rank	Name	Nation	Gap	Notes
1	1	François Pervis	France		Q
1	2	Kamil Kuczyński	Poland	+0.059	
2	1	Stefan Bötticher	Germany		Q
2	2	Adam Ptáčník	Czech Republic		DNF
3	1	Robert Förstemann	Germany		Q
3	2	Seiichiro Nakagawa	Japan	+0.024	
4	1	Denis Dmitriev	Russia		Q
4	2	Xu Chao	China	+0.252	
5	1	Max Niederlag	Germany		Q
5	2	Bernard Esterhuizen	South Africa	+0.116	
6	1	Shane Perkins	Australia		Q
6	2	Azizulhasni Awang	Malaysia	+0.022	
7	1	Jeffrey Hoogland	Netherlands		Q
7	2	Damian Zieliński	Poland	+0.050	
8	1	Matthew Crampton	Great Britain		Q
8	2	Pavel Kelemen	Czech Republic	+0.055	
9	1	Nikita Shurshin	Russia		Q
9	2	Sam Webster	New Zealand	+1.121	
10	1	Matthew Glaetzer	Australia		Q
10	2	Daniel Ellis	Australia	+0.175	
11	1	Jason Kenny	Great Britain		Q
11	2	Michaël D'Almeida	France	+0.041	
12	1	Juan Peralta	Spain		Q
12	2	Matt Archibald	New Zealand	+0.027	

=== 1/8 finals ===
The 1/8 finals were held at 14:40.

Heat	Rank	Name	Nation	Gap	Notes
1	1	François Pervis	France		Q
1	2	Juan Peralta	Spain	+0.095	
2	1	Stefan Bötticher	Germany		Q
2	2	Jason Kenny	Great Britain	+1.433	
3	1	Matthew Glaetzer	Australia		Q
3	2	Robert Förstemann	Germany	+0.084	
4	1	Denis Dmitriev	Russia		Q
4	2	Nikita Shurshin	Russia	+0.104	
5	1	Max Niederlag	Germany		Q
5	2	Matthew Crampton	Great Britain	+0.041	
6	1	Shane Perkins	Australia		Q
6	2	Jeffrey Hoogland	Netherlands	+0.226	

=== 1/8 finals repechages ===
The 1/8 finals repechages were held at 15:30.

Heat	Rank	Name	Nation	Gap	Notes
1	1	Jeffrey Hoogland	Netherlands		Q
1	2	Nikita Shurshin	Russia	+0.021	
1	3	Juan Peralta	Spain	+0.144	
2	1	Jason Kenny	Great Britain		Q
2	2	Robert Förstemann	Germany	+0.001	
2	3	Matthew Crampton	Great Britain	+0.061	

=== Quarterfinals ===
Race 1 was held at 18:40 and Race 2 at 19:35.

Heat	Rank	Name	Nation	Race 1	Race 2	Decider	Notes
1	1	François Pervis	France	X	X		Q
1	2	Jason Kenny	Great Britain	+0.073	+0.026		
2	1	Stefan Bötticher	Germany	X	X		Q
2	2	Jeffrey Hoogland	Netherlands	+0.095	+0.034		
3	1	Matthew Glaetzer	Australia	X	X		Q
3	2	Shane Perkins	Australia	+0.018	+0.010		
4	1	Denis Dmitriev	Russia	X	X		Q
4	2	Max Niederlag	Germany	+0.064	+0.035		

=== Race for 5th–8th places ===
The race for 5th–8th places was held at 20:50.

Rank	Name	Nation	Gap
5	Jason Kenny	Great Britain	
6	Max Niederlag	Germany	+0.137
7	Jeffrey Hoogland	Netherlands	+0.159
8	Shane Perkins	Australia	+0.264

=== Semifinals ===
Race 1 was held at 15:30, Race 2 at 16:00 and Race 3 at 16:20.

Heat	Rank	Name	Nation	Race 1	Race 2	Decider	Notes
1	1	François Pervis	France	X	X		Q
1	2	Denis Dmitriev	Russia	+0.015	+0.057		
2	1	Stefan Bötticher	Germany	X	+0.004	X	Q
2	2	Matthew Glaetzer	Australia	+0.146	X	+0.027	

=== Finals ===
Race 1 was held at 17:00 and Race 2 at 17:25.

Rank	Name	Nation	Race 1	Race 2	Decider
Gold Medal Races
1st place, gold medalist(s)	François Pervis	France	X	X	
2nd place, silver medalist(s)	Stefan Bötticher	Germany	+0.040	+0.032	
Bronze Medal Races
3rd place, bronze medalist(s)	Denis Dmitriev	Russia	X	X	
4	Matthew Glaetzer	Australia	+0.024	+0.072	
