= 2014 UCI Track Cycling World Championships – Men's keirin =

The Men's keirin at the 2014 UCI Track Cycling World Championships was held on February 27. 21 cyclists participated in the contest. After the four qualifying heats, the fastest rider in each heat advanced to the second round. The riders that had not advanced to the second round, raced in four repechage heats. The first two riders in each heat advanced to the second round along with the four that qualified before.

The first three riders from each of the two Second Round heats advanced to the Final and the remaining riders raced a consolation 7–12 final.

== Medalists ==
Gold	François Pervis (FRA)
Silver	Fabián Puerta (COL)
Bronze	Matthijs Büchli (NED)

== Results ==
=== First round ===
The first round was started at 13:10.

==== Heat 1 ====
Rank	Name	Nation	Gap	Notes
1	Jason Kenny	Great Britain		Q
2	Matthew Glaetzer	Australia	+0.012	
3	Adam Ptáčník	Czech Republic	+0.919	
4	Valentin Savitskiy	Russia	+2.633	
	Yuta Wakimoto	Japan		DNF

==== Heat 2 ====
Rank	Name	Nation	Gap	Notes
1	Fabián Puerta	Colombia		Q
2	Hugo Barrette	Canada	+0.269	
3	Maximilian Levy	Germany	+0.375	
4	Kazunari Watanabe	Japan	+0.616	
	Edward Dawkins	New Zealand		REL

==== Heat 3 ====
Rank	Name	Nation	Gap	Notes
1	Simon van Velthooven	New Zealand		Q
2	Matthijs Büchli	Netherlands	+0.095	
3	Tobias Wächter	Germany	+0.200	
4	Kian Emadi	Great Britain	+0.216	
5	Azizulhasni Awang	Malaysia	+0.223	

==== Heat 4 ====
Rank	Name	Nation	Gap	Notes
1	François Pervis	France		Q
2	Joachim Eilers	Germany	+0.050	
3	Christos Volikakis	Greece	+0.237	
4	Matthew Crampton	Great Britain	+0.569	
5	Sergio Aliaga	Spain	+1.225	
6	Shane Perkins	Australia	+1.547	

=== First round repechage ===
The first round repechage was started at 14:40.

==== Heat 1 ====
Rank	Name	Nation	Gap	Notes
1	Matthew Glaetzer	Australia		Q
2	Christos Volikakis	Greece	+0.028	Q
3	Kian Emadi	Great Britain	+0.786	
4	Edward Dawkins	New Zealand	+7.131	

==== Heat 2 ====
Rank	Name	Nation	Gap	Notes
1	Matthew Crampton	Great Britain		Q
2	Azizulhasni Awang	Malaysia	+0.014	Q
3	Hugo Barrette	Canada	+0.112	
4	Adam Ptáčník	Czech Republic	+0.242	

==== Heat 3 ====
Rank	Name	Nation	Gap	Notes
1	Maximilian Levy	Germany		Q
2	Matthijs Büchli	Netherlands	+0.050	Q
3	Valentin Savitskiy	Russia	+0.082	
4	Sergio Aliaga	Spain	+0.419	

==== Heat 4 ====
Rank	Name	Nation	Gap	Notes
1	Joachim Eilers	Germany		Q
2	Shane Perkins	Australia	+0.011	Q
3	Tobias Wächter	Germany	+0.097	
4	Kazunari Watanabe	Japan	+0.773	
5	Yuta Wakimoto	Japan	+1.234	

=== Second round ===
The second round was started at 20:00.

==== Heat 1 ====
Rank	Name	Nation	Gap	Notes
1	François Pervis	France		Q
2	Maximilian Levy	Germany		Q
3	Jason Kenny	Great Britain	+0.089	Q
4	Matthew Crampton	Great Britain	+0.129	
5	Shane Perkins	Australia	+0.233	
6	Christos Volikakis	Greece	+0.233	

==== Heat 2 ====
Rank	Name	Nation	Gap	Notes
1	Joachim Eilers	Germany		
2	Fabián Puerta	Colombia	+0.051	
3	Matthijs Büchli	Netherlands	+0.164	
4	Matthew Glaetzer	Australia	DNF	
5	Simon van Velthooven	New Zealand	DSQ	
6	Azizulhasni Awang	Malaysia	DSQ	

=== Finals ===
The finals were started at 20:45.

==== Small final ====
Rank	Name	Nation	Gap	Notes
7	Matthew Crampton	Great Britain		
8	Shane Perkins	Australia	+0.011	
9	Christos Volikakis	Greece	+0.104	
10	Matthew Glaetzer	Australia	DNS	

==== Final ====
Rank	Name	Nation	Gap	Notes
1st place, gold medalist(s)	François Pervis	France		
2nd place, silver medalist(s)	Fabián Puerta	Colombia	+0.038	
3rd place, bronze medalist(s)	Matthijs Büchli	Netherlands	+0.086	
4	Joachim Eilers	Germany	+0.137	
5	Jason Kenny	Great Britain	+1.560	
6	Maximilian Levy	Germany	DNF	
