= 2013 UCI Track Cycling World Championships – Men's keirin =

Rainbow jersey

The Men's keirin at the 2013 UCI Track Cycling World Championships was held on February 22. 28 athletes participated in the contest. After the 4 qualifying heats, the fastest two riders in each heat advanced to the second round. The riders that did not advance to the second round, raced in 4 repechage heats. The first rider in each heat advanced to the second round along with the 8 that qualified before.

The first 3 riders from each of the 2 Second Round heats advanced to the Final and the remaining riders raced a consolation 7–12 final.

== Medalists ==
Gold	Jason Kenny (GBR)
Silver	Maximilian Levy (GER)
Bronze	Matthijs Büchli (NED)

== Results ==
=== First round ===
The heats were held at 13:30.

==== Heat 1 ====
Rank	Name	Nation	Gap	Notes
1	Maximilian Levy	Germany		Q
2	Josiah Ng	Malaysia	+0.045	Q
3	Edward Dawkins	New Zealand	+0.174	
4	Quentin Lafargue	France	+0.242	
5	Denis Dmitriev	Russia	+0.396	
6	Edgar Verdugo	Mexico	+0.541	
7	Francesco Ceci	Italy	+0.628	

==== Heat 2 ====
Rank	Name	Nation	Gap	Notes
1	Tobias Wachter	Germany		Q
2	Matthijs Büchli	Netherlands	+0.080	Q
3	Jason Kenny	Great Britain	+0.296	
4	Yudai Nitta	Japan	+0.316	
5	Matthew Crampton	Great Britain	+0.447	
6	Matthew Glaetzer	Australia	+0.558	
7	Christos Volikakis	Greece	+0.688	

==== Heat 3 ====
Rank	Name	Nation	Gap	Notes
1	François Pervis	France		Q
2	Stefan Bötticher	Germany	+0.018	Q
3	Andrew Taylor	Australia	+0.134	
4	Pavel Kelemen	Czech Republic	+0.223	
5	Valentin Savitskiy	Russia	+0.418	
6	Kazunari Watanabe	Japan	+0.491	
7	Hodei Mazquiarán	Spain	+1.600	

==== Heat 4 ====
Rank	Name	Nation	Gap	Notes
1	Simon van Velthooven	New Zealand		Q
2	Scott Sunderland	Australia	+0.347	Q
3	Fabián Puerta	Colombia	+0.543	
4	Adam Ptáčník	Czech Republic	+0.604	
5	Juan Peralta	Spain	+0.675	
6	Kamil Kuczyński	Poland	+0.917	
7	Hugo Haak	Netherlands	+0.990	

=== First Round Repechage ===
The heats were held at 14:55.

==== Heat 1 ====
Rank	Name	Nation	Gap	Notes
1	Matthew Glaetzer	Australia		Q
2	Valentin Savitskiy	Russia	+0.103	
3	Edward Dawkins	New Zealand	+0.187	
4	Francesco Ceci	Italy	+0.205	
5	Adam Ptáčník	Czech Republic	+0.250	

==== Heat 2 ====
Rank	Name	Nation	Gap	Notes
1	Jason Kenny	Great Britain		Q
2	Hugo Haak	Netherlands	+0.120	
3	Matthew Crampton	Great Britain	+0.130	
4	Edgar Verdugo	Mexico	+0.158	
5	Pavel Kelemen	Czech Republic	+0.207	

==== Heat 3 ====
Rank	Name	Nation	Gap	Notes
1	Andrew Taylor	Australia		Q
2	Hodei Uria	Spain	+0.332	
3	Kamil Kuczyński	Poland	+0.433	
4	Denis Dmitriev	Russia	+0.547	
5	Yudai Nitta	Japan		REL

==== Heat 4 ====
Rank	Name	Nation	Gap	Notes
1	Christos Volikakis	Greece		Q
2	Quentin Lafargue	France	+0.113	
3	Fabián Puerta	Colombia	+0.248	
4	Juan Peralta	Spain	+0.250	
5	Kazunari Watanabe	Japan	+0.767	

=== Second round ===
The heats were held at 19:50.

==== Heat 1 ====
Rank	Name	Nation	Gap	Notes
1	Maximilian Levy	Germany		Q
2	Matthijs Büchli	Netherlands	+0.102	Q
3	Stefan Bötticher	Germany	+0.187	Q
4	Simon van Velthooven	New Zealand	+0.216	
5	Matthew Glaetzer	Australia	+0.283	
6	Christos Volikakis	Greece		REL

==== Heat 2 ====
Rank	Name	Nation	Gap	Notes
1	Andrew Taylor	Australia		Q
2	Scott Sunderland	Australia	+0.081	Q
3	Jason Kenny	Great Britain	+0.100	Q
4	Tobias Wachter	Germany	+0.247	
5	Josiah Ng	Malaysia	+0.474	
6	François Pervis	France		REL

=== Finals ===
The finals were held at 21:15.

==== Small Final ====
Rank	Name	Nation	Gap	Notes
7	François Pervis	France		
8	Matthew Glaetzer	Australia	+0.056	
9	Christos Volikakis	Greece	+0.070	
10	Tobias Wachter	Germany	+0.086	
11	Josiah Ng	Malaysia	+0.173	
12	Simon van Velthooven	New Zealand		REL

==== Final ====
Rank	Name	Nation	Gap	Notes
1st place, gold medalist(s)	Jason Kenny	Great Britain		
2nd place, silver medalist(s)	Maximilian Levy	Germany	+0.047	
3rd place, bronze medalist(s)	Matthijs Büchli	Netherlands	+0.224	
4	Andrew Taylor	Australia	+0.307	
5	Scott Sunderland	Australia	+0.701	
6	Stefan Bötticher	Germany	+0.802	
