= 2014 UEC European Track Championships – Men's sprint =

Men's sprint at the 2014 UEC European Track Championships
- UEC European Champion jersey
- Venue: Vélodrome Amédée Détraux, Baie-Mahault
- Date: 17–18 October
- Competitors: 26 from 16 nations

Medalists
gold medal	Grégory Baugé	France
silver medal	Damian Zieliński	Poland
bronze medal	Robert Förstemann	Germany

The men's sprint was held on 17–18 October 2014.

== Results ==
=== Qualifying ===
The top 24 qualify for the match rounds.

Rank	Name	Nation	Time	Notes
1	Grégory Baugé	France	10.234	Q
2	Damian Zieliński	Poland	10.241	Q
3	Pavel Kelemen	Czech Republic	10.254	Q
4	Robert Förstemann	Germany	10.268	Q
5	Kévin Sireau	France	10.346	Q
6	Callum Skinner	Great Britain	10.370	Q
7	Denis Dmitriev	Russia	10.378	Q
8	Sandor Szalontay	Hungary	10.421	Q
9	Mateusz Lipa	Poland	10.455	Q
10	Nikita Shurshin	Russia	10.459	Q
11	Juan Peralta	Spain	10.483	Q
12	Adam Ptáčník	Czech Republic	10.508	Q
13	Eoin Mullen	Ireland	10.522	Q
14	Andriy Vynokurov	Ukraine	10.534	Q
15	Matthew Crampton	Great Britain	10.542	Q
16	Tobias Wächter	Germany	10.619	Q
17	Nils van 't Hoenderdaal	Netherlands	10.690	Q
18	Stylianos Angelidis	Greece	10.744	Q
19	Christos Volikakis	Greece	10.745	Q
20	Vasilijus Lendel	Lithuania	10.773	Q
21	Yauhen Veramchuk	Belarus	10.779	Q
22	Svajunas Jonauskas	Lithuania	10.793	Q
23	Francesco Ceci	Italy	10.819	Q
24	Sergio Aliaga	Spain	10.871	Q
25	Uladzislau Novik	Belarus	10.973	
26	Jani Mikkonen	Finland	11.125	

=== 1/16 Finals ===
Winners proceed to the 1/8 finals.

Heat	Rank	Name	Nation	Time	Notes
1	1	Grégory Baugé	France	11.588	Q
1	2	Sergio Aliaga	Spain		
2	1	Damian Zieliński	Poland	10.806	Q
2	2	Francesco Ceci	Italy		
3	1	Pavel Kelemen	Czech Republic	11.875	Q
3	2	Svajunas Jonauskas	Lithuania		
4	1	Robert Förstemann	Germany	10.734	Q
4	2	Yauhen Veramchuk	Belarus		
5	1	Vasilijus Lendel	Lithuania	11.243	Q
5	2	Kévin Sireau	France		
6	1	Christos Volikakis	Greece	11.264	Q
6	2	Callum Skinner	Great Britain		
7	1	Denis Dmitriev	Russia	11.421	Q
7	2	Stylianos Angelidis	Greece		
8	1	Nils van 't Hoenderdaal	Netherlands	11.152	Q
8	2	Sandor Szalontay	Hungary		
9	1	Mateusz Lipa	Poland	11.008	Q
9	2	Tobias Wächter	Germany		
10	1	Nikita Shurshin	Russia	11.083	Q
10	2	Matthew Crampton	Great Britain		
11	1	Juan Peralta	Spain	10.841	Q
11	2	Andriy Vynokurov	Ukraine		
12	1	Adam Ptáčník	Czech Republic	11.185	Q
12	2	Eoin Mullen	Ireland		

=== 1/8 Finals ===
Winners proceed directly to the quarter-finals; losers proceed to the repechage.

Heat	Rank	Name	Nation	Time	Notes
1	1	Grégory Baugé	France	11.559	Q
1	2	Adam Ptáčník	Czech Republic		
2	1	Damian Zieliński	Poland	10.972	Q
2	2	Juan Peralta	Spain		
3	1	Nikita Shurshin	Russia	10.878	Q
3	2	Pavel Kelemen	Czech Republic		
4	1	Robert Förstemann	Germany	11.052	Q
4	2	Mateusz Lipa	Poland		
5	1	Vasilijus Lendel	Lithuania	11.360	Q
5	2	Nils van 't Hoenderdaal	Netherlands		
6	1	Denis Dmitriev	Russia	10.803	Q
6	2	Christos Volikakis	Greece		

=== 1/8 Finals Repechages ===
Winners proceed to the quarter-finals.

Heat	Rank	Name	Nation	Time	Notes
1	1	Adam Ptáčník	Czech Republic	11.356	Q
1	2	Mateusz Lipa	Poland		
1	3	Christos Volikakis	Greece		
2	1	Pavel Kelemen	Czech Republic	10.695	Q
2	2	Juan Peralta	Spain		
2	3	Nils van 't Hoenderdaal	Netherlands		

=== Quarter-finals ===
One-on-one matches are extended to a 'best of three' format hereon. Winners proceed to the semi-finals; losers proceed to the race for places 5–8.

Heat	Rank	Name	Nation	Race 1	Race 2	Decider	Notes
1	1	Grégory Baugé	France		10.690	11.675	Q
1	2	Pavel Kelemen	Czech Republic	10.556			
2	1	Damian Zieliński	Poland	10.522	10.762		Q
2	2	Adam Ptáčník	Czech Republic				
3	1	Nikita Shurshin	Russia	10.625	10.547		Q
3	2	Denis Dmitriev	Russia				
4	1	Robert Förstemann	Germany	11.303	11.185		Q
4	2	Vasilijus Lendel	Lithuania				

=== Race for 5th place ===
This ranking final determines the allocation of places 5–8.

Rank	Name	Nation	Time
5	Denis Dmitriev	Russia	10.731
6	Adam Ptáčník	Czech Republic	
7	Pavel Kelemen	Czech Republic	
8	Vasilijus Lendel	Lithuania	

=== Semi-finals ===
Winners proceed to the gold medal final; losers proceed to the bronze medal final.

Heat	Rank	Name	Nation	Race 1	Race 2	Decider	Notes
1	1	Grégory Baugé	France		10.525	10.303	Q
1	2	Robert Förstemann	Germany	10.540			
2	1	Damian Zieliński	Poland	10.687	10.399		Q
2	2	Nikita Shurshin	Russia				

=== Finals ===
The final classification is determined in the medal finals.

Rank	Name	Nation	Race 1	Race 2	Decider
Bronze medal final
3rd place, bronze medalist(s)	Robert Förstemann	Germany	10.523	10.695	
4	Nikita Shurshin	Russia			
Gold medal final
1st place, gold medalist(s)	Grégory Baugé	France	10.767	10.723	
2nd place, silver medalist(s)	Damian Zieliński	Poland			
