= 2012 European Track Championships – Men's sprint =

UEC European Champion jersey

The Men's sprint event at the 2012 European Track Championships of track cycling was held on 20 October 2012. The event began with 27 riders participating in a qualifying round, and culminated in a final where Russian cyclist Denis Dmitriev won the gold medal.

== Medalists ==
Gold	Denis Dmitriev (RUS)
Silver	Max Niederlag (GER)
Bronze	Christos Volikakis (GRE)

== Results ==
=== Qualifying ===
Fastest 24 riders advanced to the 1/16 finals, it was held at 10:00.

Rank	Name	Nation	Time	Notes
1	Max Niederlag	Germany	10.097	Q
2	Andriy Vynokurov	Ukraine	10.223	Q
3	Denis Dmitriev	Russia	10.224	Q
4	Nikita Shurshin	Russia	10.224	Q
5	Lewis Oliva	Great Britain	10.267	Q
6	Callum Skinner	Great Britain	10.308	Q
7	Adam Ptáčník	Czech Republic	10.310	Q
8	Charlie Conord	France	10.311	Q
9	Christos Volikakis	Greece	10.325	Q
10	Tobias Wächter	Germany	10.367	Q
11	Damian Zieliński	Poland	10.418	Q
12	Matthijs Büchli	Netherlands	10.447	Q
13	Julien Palma	France	10.459	Q
14	Tomáš Bábek	Czech Republic	10.512	Q
15	Rafal Sarnecki	Poland	10.562	Q
16	Hylke van Grieken	Netherlands	10.567	Q
17	Sotirios Bretas	Greece	10.651	Q
18	Eoin Mullen	Ireland	10.695	Q
19	Francesco Ceci	Italy	10.712	Q
20	Andriy Kutsenko	Ukraine	10.735	Q
21	Miroslav Minchev	Bulgaria	10.888	Q
22	Jani Mikkonen	Finland	11.110	Q
23	Wille-Oskari Riihela	Finland	11.120	Q
24	Vladislav Novik	Belarus	11.243	Q
25	Airidas Videika	Lithuania	11.281	
26	Evgeni Veremchuk	Belarus	11.395	
–	Davit Askurava	Georgia		DNS

=== 1/16 Finals ===
Winner of each heat qualified to 1/8 Finals, the races were held at 10:55.

Heat	Rank	Name	Nation	Time	Notes
1	1	Max Niederlag	Germany	10.868	Q
1	2	Vladislav Novik	Belarus		
2	1	Andriy Vynokurov	Ukraine		Q
2	2	Wille-Oskari Riihela	Finland		DSQ
3	1	Denis Dmitriev	Russia	11.787	Q
3	2	Jani Mikkonen	Finland		
4	1	Nikita Shurshin	Russia	10.969	Q
4	2	Miroslav Minchev	Bulgaria		
5	1	Lewis Oliva	Great Britain	10.911	Q
5	2	Andriy Kutsenko	Ukraine		
6	1	Callum Skinner	Great Britain	10.798	Q
6	2	Francesco Ceci	Italy		
7	1	Adam Ptáčník	Czech Republic	11.069	Q
7	2	Eoin Mullen	Ireland		
8	1	Charlie Conord	France	10.792	Q
8	2	Sotirios Bretas	Greece		
9	1	Christos Volikakis	Greece	10.760	Q
9	2	Hylke van Grieken	Netherlands		
10	1	Tobias Wächter	Germany	11.045	Q
10	2	Rafal Sarnecki	Poland		
11	1	Tomáš Bábek	Czech Republic	10.862	Q
11	2	Damian Zieliński	Poland		
12	1	Julien Palma	France	10.927	Q
12	2	Matthijs Büchli	Netherlands		REL

=== 1/8 Finals ===
Winner of each heat qualified to 1/4 Finals, losers went to the repêchage. The races were held at 11:41.

Heat	Rank	Name	Nation	Time	Notes
1	1	Max Niederlag	Germany	10.628	Q
1	2	Julien Palma	France		
2	1	Andriy Vynokurov	Ukraine	10.674	Q
2	2	Tomáš Bábek	Czech Republic		
3	1	Denis Dmitriev	Russia	10.717	Q
3	2	Tobias Wächter	Germany		
4	1	Christos Volikakis	Greece	10.971	Q
4	2	Nikita Shurshin	Russia		
5	1	Charlie Conord	France	10.628	Q
5	2	Lewis Oliva	Great Britain		
6	1	Callum Skinner	Great Britain	10.852	Q
6	2	Adam Ptáčník	Czech Republic		

=== 1/8 Finals Repechage ===
The loser of the 1/8 Finals raced, winners advanced to the Quarterfinals. Races were held at 12:09.

Heat	Rank	Name	Nation	Time	Notes
1	1	Nikita Shurshin	Russia	11.180	Q
1	2	Julien Palma	France		
1	3	Adam Ptáčník	Czech Republic		
2	1	Tomáš Bábek	Czech Republic	10.734	Q
2	2	Tobias Wächter	Germany		
2	3	Lewis Oliva	Great Britain		

=== Quarterfinals ===
The races were held at 12:42, 13:26 and 13:51.

Heat	Rank	Name	Nation	Race 1	Race 2	Decider	Notes
1	1	Max Niederlag	Germany	10.753	10.806		Q
1	2	Tomáš Bábek	Czech Republic				
2	1	Nikita Shurshin	Russia		10.641	10.404	Q
2	2	Andriy Vynokurov	Ukraine	10.551			
3	1	Denis Dmitriev	Russia	10.342	10.575		Q
3	2	Callum Skinner	Great Britain				
4	1	Christos Volikakis	Greece	10.716	10.698		Q
4	2	Charlie Conord	France				

=== Race for 5th–8th Places ===
It was held at 20:56.

Rank	Name	Nation	Time
5	Andriy Vynokurov	Ukraine	10.790
6	Tomáš Bábek	Czech Republic	
7	Charlie Conord	France	
8	Callum Skinner	Great Britain	

=== Semifinals ===
The races were held at 19:36 and 20:28.

Heat	Rank	Name	Nation	Race 1	Race 2	Decider	Notes
1	1	Max Niederlag	Germany	10.897	10.648		Q
1	2	Christos Volikakis	Greece				
2	1	Denis Dmitriev	Russia	11.055	10.844		Q
2	2	Nikita Shurshin	Russia				

=== Finals ===
The races were held at 21:12, 21:39 and 21:45.

Rank	Name	Nation	Race 1	Race 2	Decider
Gold Medal Races
1st place, gold medalist(s)	Denis Dmitriev	Russia	10.485	10.350	
2nd place, silver medalist(s)	Max Niederlag	Germany			
Bronze Medal Races
3rd place, bronze medalist(s)	Christos Volikakis	Greece	10.727		10.704
4	Nikita Shurshin	Russia		10.760	
