= 2014 UEC European Track Championships – Men's team sprint =

International sporting event

Men's team sprint at the 2014 UEC European Track Championships
- UEC European Champion jersey
- Venue: Vélodrome Amédée Détraux, Baie-Mahault
- Date: 16 October
- Competitors: 30 from 10 nations

Medalists
gold medal	Robert Förstemann; Tobias Wächter; Joachim Eilers	Germany
silver medal	Grégory Baugé; Kévin Sireau; Michaël D'Almeida	France
bronze medal	Pavel Yakushevskiy; Denis Dmitriev; Nikita Shurshin	Russia

The Men's team sprint was held on 16 October 2014.

== Results ==
=== Qualifying ===
The fastest 4 teams qualify for the medal finals.

Rank	Name	Nation	Time	Notes
1	Robert Förstemann; Tobias Wächter; Joachim Eilers	Germany	59.991	QG
2	Grégory Baugé; Kévin Sireau; Michaël D'Almeida	France	1:00.404	QG
3	Rafał Sarnecki; Mateusz Lipa; Krzysztof Maksel	Poland	1:01.129	QB
4	Pavel Yakushevskiy; Denis Dmitriev; Nikita Shurshin	Russia	1:01.182	QB
5	Nils van 't Hoenderdaal; Jeffrey Hoogland; Matthijs Büchli	Netherlands	1:01.282	
6	Lewis Oliva; Callum Skinner; Matthew Crampton	Great Britain	1:01.377	
7	Adam Ptáčník; Pavel Kelemen; Tomáš Bábek	Czech Republic	1:01.824	
8	Yauhen Veramchuk; Artsiom Zaitsau; Uladzislau Novik	Belarus	1:02.653	
9	Ioannis Kalogeropoulos; Stylianos Angelidis; Sotirios Bretas	Greece	1:03.455	
10	José Moreno Sánchez; Juan Peralta; Sergio Aliaga	Spain	1:04.068	

- QG = qualified for gold medal final
- QB = qualified for bronze medal final

=== Finals ===
The final classification is determined in the medal finals.

Rank	Name	Nation	Time	Notes
Bronze medal final
3rd place, bronze medalist(s)	Pavel Yakushevskiy; Denis Dmitriev; Nikita Shurshin	Russia	1:00.061	
4	Rafał Sarnecki; Mateusz Lipa; Krzysztof Maksel	Poland	1:00.535	
Gold medal final
1st place, gold medalist(s)	Robert Förstemann; Tobias Wächter; Joachim Eilers	Germany	59.602	
2nd place, silver medalist(s)	Grégory Baugé; Kévin Sireau; Michaël D'Almeida	France	59.820	
