= 2013 UEC European Track Championships – Men's sprint =

Men's sprint at the 2013 UEC European Track Championships
- UEC European Champion jersey
- Venue: Omnisport Apeldoorn, Apeldoorn
- Date: 19 October
- Competitors: 27 from 15 nations

Medalists
gold medal	Denis Dmitriev	Russia
silver medal	Robert Förstemann	Germany
bronze medal	Jason Kenny	Great Britain

The men's sprint was held on 19 October 2013, with 27 riders participating.

== Results ==
=== Qualifying ===
The fastest 24 riders advanced to the 1/16 finals, the qualifying was held at 11:30.

Rank	Name	Nation	Time	Notes
1	Robert Förstemann	Germany	9.992	Q
2	Stefan Bötticher	Germany	10.065	Q
3	Denis Dmitriev	Russia	10.080	Q
4	Michael D'Almeida	France	10.155	Q
5	Juan Peralta	Spain	10.161	Q
6	Pavel Kelemen	Czech Republic	10.175	Q
7	Hugo Haak	Netherlands	10.180	Q
8	Jason Kenny	Great Britain	10.230	Q
9	Damian Zieliński	Poland	10.240	Q
10	Adam Ptáčník	Czech Republic	10.263	Q
11	Nikita Shurshin	Russia	10.268	Q
12	Christos Volikakis	Greece	10.289	Q
13	Andriy Vynokurov	Ukraine	10.293	Q
14	Krzysztof Maksel	Poland	10.303	Q
15	Kevin Sireau	France	10.364	Q
16	Eoin Mullen	Ireland	10.435	Q
17	Kian Emadi	Great Britain	10.471	Q
18	Jeffrey Hoogland	Netherlands	10.475	Q
19	Zafeiris Volikakis	Greece	10.479	Q
20	Svajūnas Jonauskas	Lithuania	10.548	Q
21	Jose Moreno	Spain	10.579	Q
22	Arūnas Lendel	Lithuania	10.656	Q
23	Andriy Sach	Ukraine	10.693	Q
24	Francesco Ceci	Italy	10.794	Q
25	Artisiom Zaitsau	Belarus	10.813	
26	Vladislav Novik	Belarus	10.911	
27	Jani Mikkonen	Finland	10.971	

=== 1/16 Finals ===
Winners proceed to the 1/8 finals.

Heat	Rank	Name	Nation	Time	Notes
1	1	Robert Förstemann	Germany	X	Q
1	2	Francesco Ceci	Italy		
2	1	Stefan Bötticher	Germany	X	Q
2	2	Andrii Sach	Ukraine		
3	1	Denis Dmitriev	Russia	X	Q
3	2	Arūnas Lendel	Lithuania		
4	1	José Moreno Sánchez	Spain	X	Q
4	2	Michaël D'Almeida	France		
5	1	Juan Peralta Gascon	Spain	X	Q
5	2	Svajūnas Jonauskas	Lithuania		
6	1	Pavel Kelemen	Czech Republic	X	Q
6	2	Zafeiris Volikakis	Greece		
7	1	Hugo Haak	Netherlands	X	Q
7	2	Jeffrey Hoogland	Netherlands		
8	1	Jason Kenny	Great Britain	X	Q
8	2	Kian Emadi	Great Britain		
9	1	Damian Zieliński	Poland	X	Q
9	2	Eoin Mullen	Ireland		
10	1	Adam Ptáčník	Czech Republic	X	Q
10	2	Kévin Sireau	France		
11	1	Nikita Shurshin	Russia	X	Q
11	2	Krzysztof Maksel	Poland		
12	1	Christos Volikakis	Greece	X	Q
12	2	Andriy Vinokurov	Ukraine		

=== 1/8 Finals ===
Winners proceed directly to the quarter-finals; losers proceed to the repechage.

Heat	Rank	Name	Nation	Time	Notes
1	1	Robert Förstemann	Germany	X	Q
1	2	Christos Volikakis	Greece		
2	1	Stefan Bötticher	Germany	X	Q
2	2	Nikita Shurshin	Russia		
3	1	Denis Dmitriev	Russia	X	Q
3	2	Adam Ptáčník	Czech Republic		
4	1	Damian Zieliński	Poland	X	Q
4	2	José Moreno Sánchez	Spain		
5	1	Jason Kenny	Great Britain	X	Q
5	2	Juan Peralta Gascon	Spain		
6	1	Hugo Haak	Netherlands	X	Q
6	2	Pavel Kelemen	Czech Republic		

=== 1/8 Finals Repechages ===
Winners proceed to the quarter-finals.

Heat	Rank	Name	Nation	Time	Notes
1	1	José Moreno Sánchez	Spain	X	Q
1	2	Pavel Kelemen	Czech Republic		
1	3	Christos Volikakis	Greece		
2	1	Nikita Shurshin	Russia	X	Q
2	2	Adam Ptáčník	Czech Republic		
2	3	Juan Peralta Gascon	Spain		

=== Quarter-finals ===
One-on-one matches are extended to a 'best of three' format hereon. Winners proceed to the semi-finals; losers proceed to the race for places 5–8.

Heat	Rank	Name	Nation	Race 1	Race 2	Decider	Notes
1	1	Robert Förstemann	Germany	X	X		Q
1	2	Nikita Shurshin	Russia				
2	1	Stefan Bötticher	Germany	X	X		Q
2	2	José Moreno Sánchez	Spain				
3	1	Denis Dmitriev	Russia	X	X		Q
3	2	Hugo Haak	Netherlands				
4	1	Jason Kenny	Great Britain	X	X		Q
4	2	Damian Zieliński	Poland				

=== Race for 5th place ===
This ranking final determines the allocation of places 5–8.

Rank	Name	Nation	Time
5	Hugo Haak	Netherlands	X
6	Nikita Shurshin	Russia	
7	Damian Zieliński	Poland	
8	José Moreno Sánchez	Spain	

=== Semi-finals ===
Winners proceed to the gold medal final; losers proceed to the bronze medal final.

Heat	Rank	Name	Nation	Race 1	Race 2	Decider	Notes
1	1	Robert Förstemann	Germany	X	X		Q
1	2	Jason Kenny	Great Britain				
2	1	Denis Dmitriev	Russia	X	X		Q
2	2	Stefan Bötticher	Germany				

=== Finals ===
The races were held at 21:04 and 21:19.

Rank	Name	Nation	Race 1	Race 2	Decider
Gold medal races
1st place, gold medalist(s)	Denis Dmitriev	Russia	X	X	
2nd place, silver medalist(s)	Robert Förstemann	Germany			
Bronze medal races
3rd place, bronze medalist(s)	Jason Kenny	Great Britain	X	X	
4	Stefan Bötticher	Germany			
