= Herraiz =

Herraiz or Herráiz (pronounced [eˈrajθ]) is a Spanish surname of Basque origin. Notable people with the surname include:

- Elena Herraiz Medina (born 1992), known as Linguriosa, Spanish YouTuber, linguist and teacher
- Itmar Esteban Herraiz (born 1983), Spanish cyclist
- Pablo Clavería Herráiz (born 1996), Spanish footballer
- Rubén Herráiz Alcaraz (born 1993), known as Rufo, Spanish footballer
