= Gregorič =

Gregorič is a Slovenian surname. Notable people with the surname include:

- Kristjan Gregorič (born 1989), Slovenian cyclist
- Maks Gregorič (born 1985), Slovenian motorcycle speedway rider
- Miha Gregorič (born 1989), Slovenian footballer

== See also ==
- Gregoritsch
