= Max Niederlag =

German bicycle racer

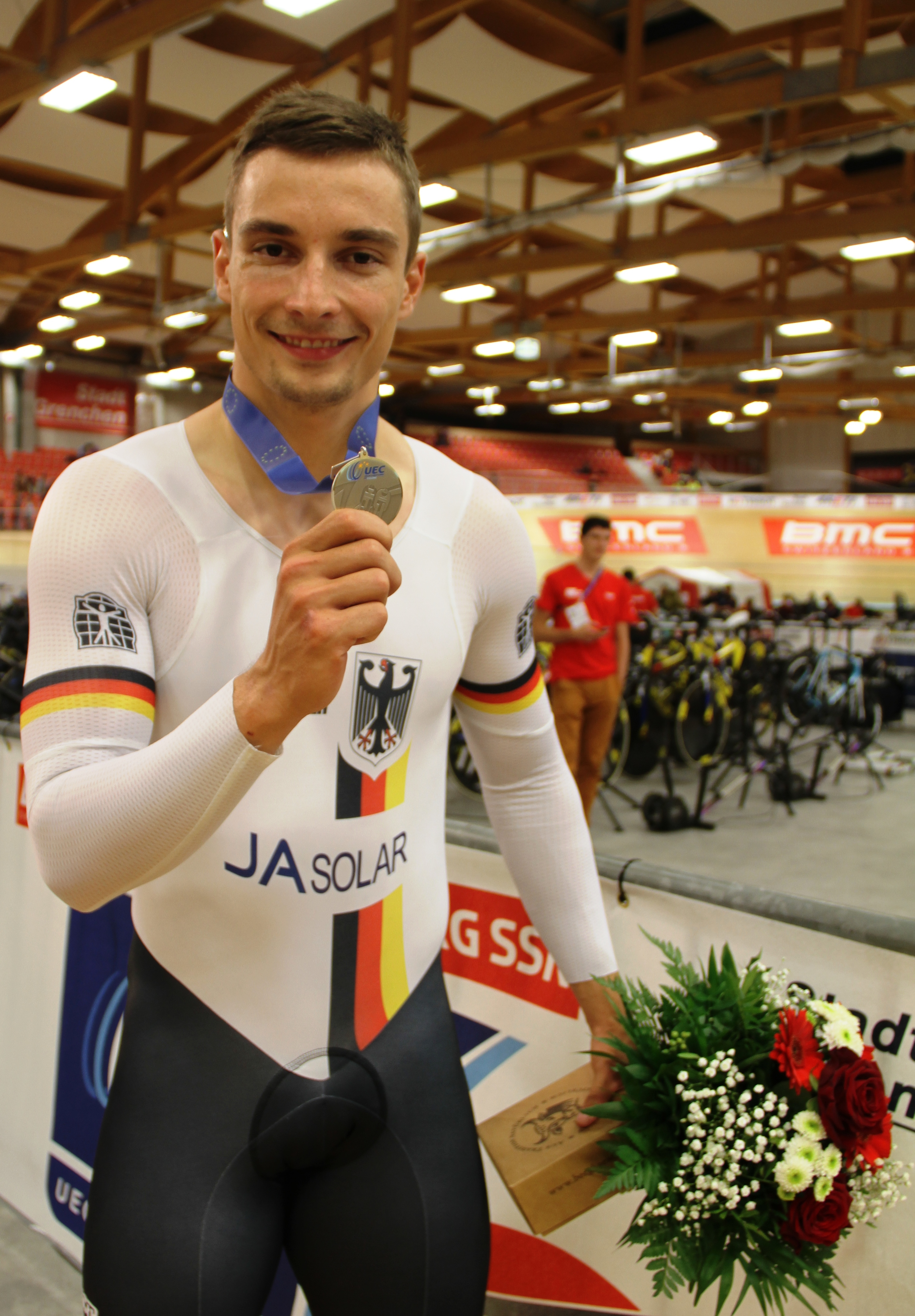
- Niederlag in 2015

Personal information
- Born: 5 May 1993 (age 33)

Cycling career
- Sport: Cycling
- Discipline: Track cycling
Medal record
World Championships
Bronze medal – third place	2016 London	Team sprint
European Championships
Silver medal – second place	2012 Panevėžys	Sprint
Bronze medal – third place	2015 Grenchen	Team sprint

Max Niederlag (born 5 May 1993) is a German track cyclist. He won at the 2012 UEC European Track Championships the silver medal in the sprint. He won three years later the bronze medal in the team sprint at the 2015 UEC European Track Championships in Grenchen, Switzerland. He participated at the 2014 UCI Track Cycling World Championships in the sprint.
