= Gregoritsch =

Gregoritsch is a surname. Notable people with the surname include:

- Michael Gregoritsch (born 1994), Austrian footballer
- Werner Gregoritsch (born 1958), Austrian football player and manager

== See also ==
- Gregorič
