= 2011 European Track Championships – Men's keirin =

UEC European Champion jersey

The men's keirin was held on 23 October 2011, with 23 riders participating.

== Medalists ==
Gold	Matthew Crampton (GBR)
Silver	Christos Volikakis (GRE)
Bronze	François Pervis (FRA)

== Results ==
=== Qualifying ===
The first two riders in each heat qualified for the second round, remainder to first round repechage. Races were held at 11:10.

==== Heat 1 ====
Rank	Name	Nation	Notes
1	Mickaël Bourgain	France	Q
2	Jason Kenny	Great Britain	Q
3	Vladimir Khozov	Russia	
4	Maximilian Levy	Germany	
5	Zafeiris Volikakis	Greece	
6	Kim van Leemput	Belgium	

==== Heat 2 ====
Rank	Name	Nation	Notes
1	Matthew Crampton	Great Britain	Q
2	Adam Ptáčník	Czech Republic	Q
3	Hugo Haak	Netherlands	
4	Andrii Kutsenko	Ukraine	
5	Kamil Kuczyński	Poland	
6	Francesco Ceci	Italy	

==== Heat 3 ====
Rank	Name	Nation	Notes
1	François Pervis	France	Q
2	René Enders	Germany	Q
3	Hodei Mazquiarán	Spain	
4	Teun Mulder	Netherlands	
5	Andriy Vynokurov	Ukraine	
–	Luca Ceci	Italy	DNS

==== Heat 4 ====
Rank	Name	Nation	Notes
1	Sergey Borisov	Russia	Q
2	Christos Volikakis	Greece	Q
3	Juan Peralta	Spain	
4	Adrian Tekliński	Poland	
–	Denis Špička	Czech Republic	DNF

=== First round repechage ===
The first rider in each heat qualified for the second round. Races were held at 12:50.

==== Heat 1 ====
Rank	Name	Nation	Notes
1	Francesco Ceci	Italy	Q
2	Vladimir Khozov	Russia	
3	Adrian Tekliński	Poland	
4	Andriy Vynokurov	Ukraine	

==== Heat 2 ====
Rank	Name	Nation	Notes
1	Hugo Haak	Netherlands	Q
2	Teun Mulder	Netherlands	
3	Kamil Kuczyński	Poland	
4	Kim van Leemput	Belgium	

==== Heat 3 ====
Rank	Name	Nation	Notes
1	Hodei Mazquiarán	Spain	Q
2	Zafeiris Volikakis	Greece	
3	Andrii Kutsenko	Ukraine	

==== Heat 4 ====
Rank	Name	Nation	Notes
1	Maximilian Levy	Germany	Q
2	Denis Špička	Czech Republic	
3	Juan Peralta	Spain	

=== Second round ===
The first three riders in each heat qualified for the final 1–6 and the others to final 7–12. Races were held at 15:30.

==== Heat 1 ====
Rank	Name	Nation	Notes
1	Maximilian Levy	Germany	Q
2	René Enders	Germany	Q
3	Mickaël Bourgain	France	Q
4	Francesco Ceci	Italy	
5	Sergey Borisov	Russia	
6	Adam Ptáčník	Czech Republic	

==== Heat 2 ====
Rank	Name	Nation	Notes
1	François Pervis	France	Q
2	Christos Volikakis	Greece	Q
3	Matthew Crampton	Great Britain	Q
4	Jason Kenny	Great Britain	
5	Hugo Haak	Netherlands	
6	Hodei Mazquiarán	Spain	

=== Finals ===
The 7–12 place final was held at 17:29, with the final being held at 17:33.

==== Final 7–12 places ====
Rank	Name	Nation	Notes
7	Jason Kenny	Great Britain	
8	Hugo Haak	Netherlands	
9	Adam Ptáčník	Czech Republic	
10	Sergey Borisov	Russia	
11	Francesco Ceci	Italy	
12	Hodei Mazquiarán	Spain	

==== Final ====
Rank	Name	Nation	Notes
1st place, gold medalist(s)	Matthew Crampton	Great Britain	
2nd place, silver medalist(s)	Christos Volikakis	Greece	
3rd place, bronze medalist(s)	François Pervis	France	
4	Mickaël Bourgain	France	
5	René Enders	Germany	
6	Maximilian Levy	Germany	
