= Charlie Conord =

French cyclist

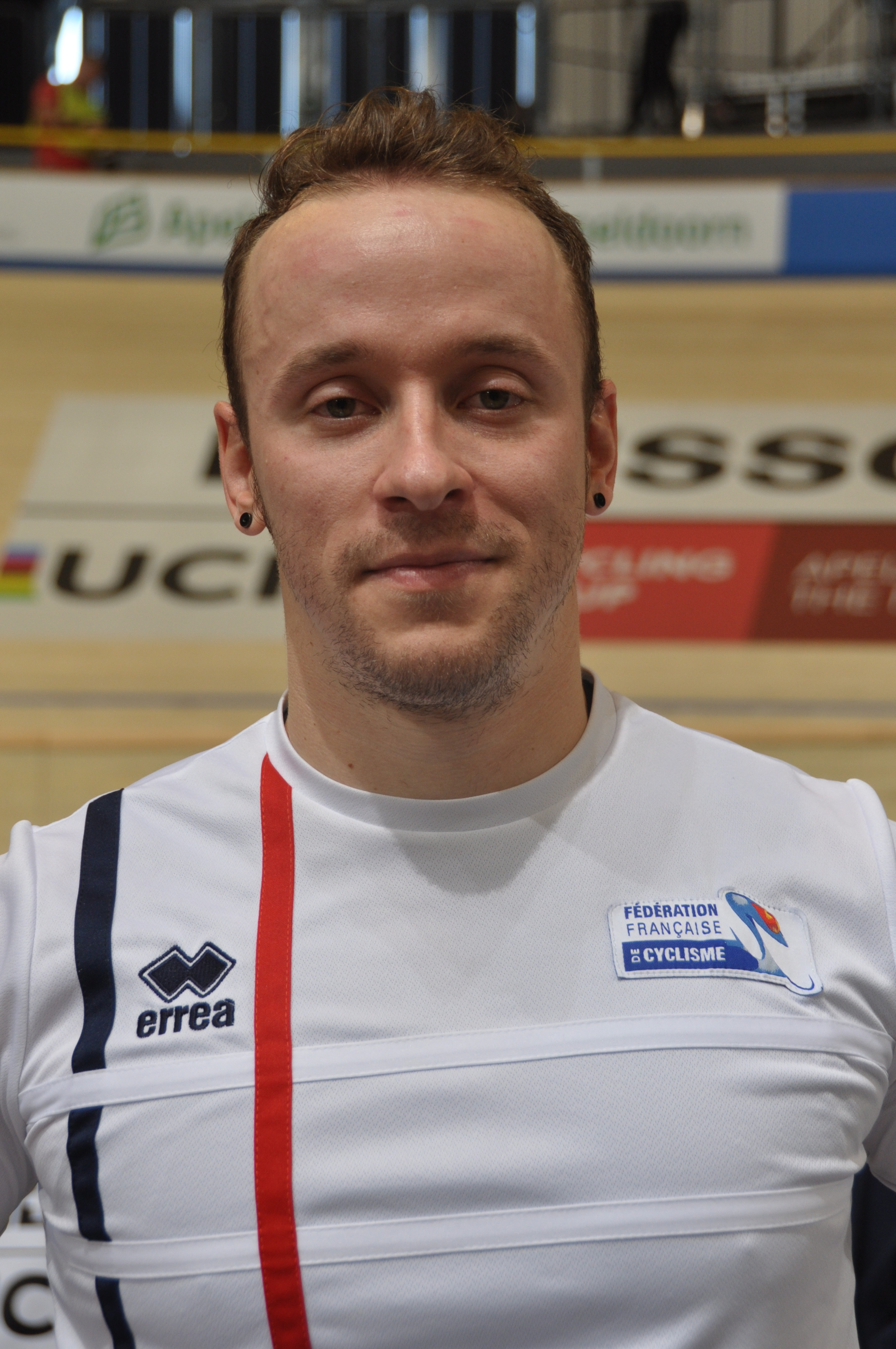
- Charlie Conord (2016)

Personal information
- Born: 28 July 1990 (age 36) Ambilly, France

Cycling career
- Sport: Cycling
- Discipline: Track cycling
Medal record
Men's track cycling
Representing France
UEC European Track Championships
Bronze medal – third place	2016 Saint-Quentin-en-Yvelines	Keirin

Charlie Conord (born 28 July 1990 in Ambilly) is a French male track cyclist, representing France at international competitions. He competed in sprint events at the 2010, 2012 and 2013 UCI Track Cycling World Championships. He won the bronze medal at the 2016 UEC European Track Championships in the keirin event.
