= Elena Herraiz =

Spanish YouTuber (born 1992)

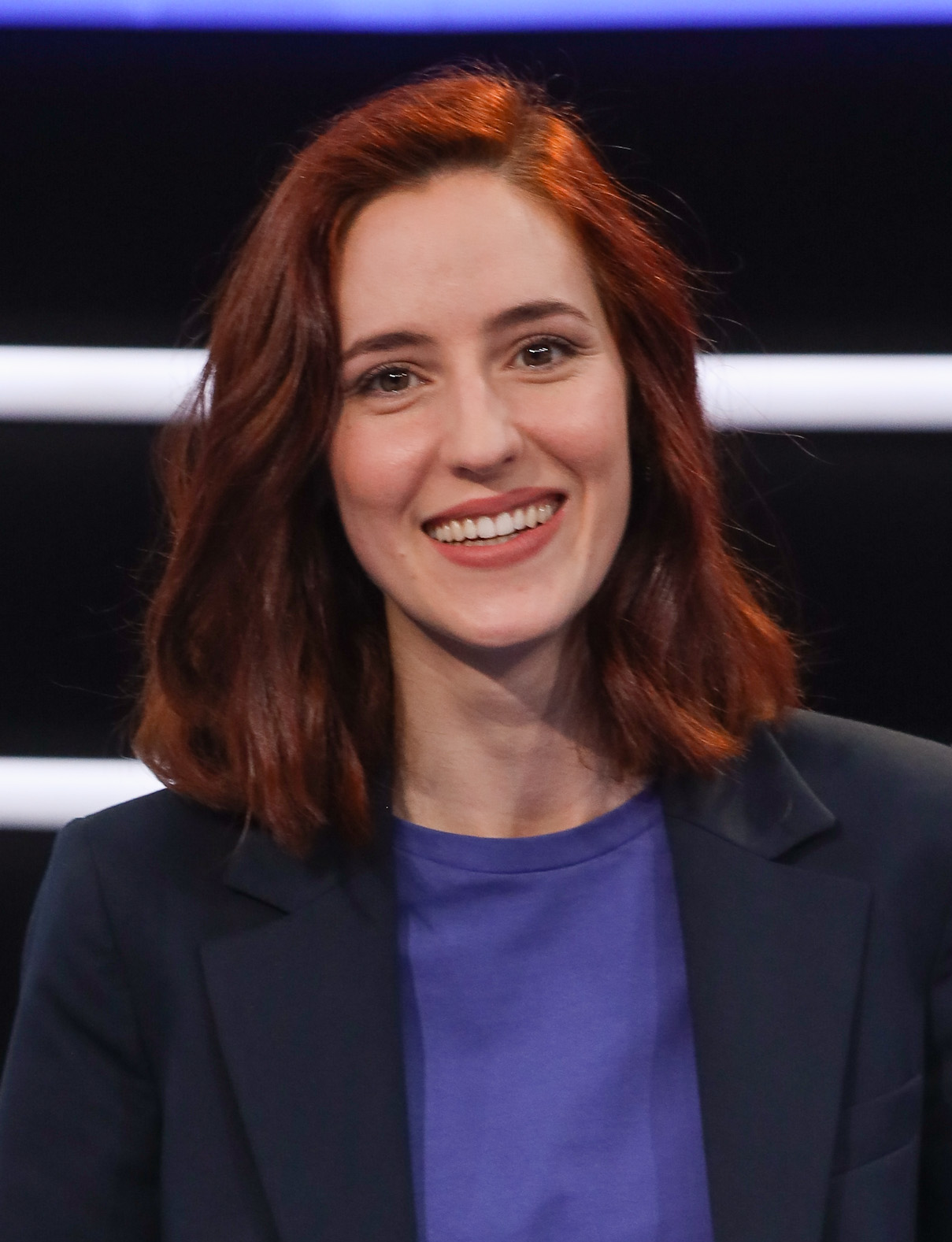
- Herraiz on Cifras y letras in January 2025
- Born: Elena Herraiz Medina; 11 November 1992 (age 33); Guadalajara, Castilla–La Mancha, Spain
- Education: University of Valladolid; University of Alcalá
- Occupations: Linguist; teacher; internet personality

YouTube information
- Channel: Linguriosa
- Years active: 2019–present
- Genre: Linguistics
- Subscribers: 946 thousand
- Views: 146.1 million
- Last updated: 31 August 2026
- Website: linguriosa.com

Elena Herraiz Medina (Spanish pronunciation: [eˈlena eˈrajθ meˈðina]; born 11 November 1992), known online as Linguriosa (pronounced [liŋɡuˈɾjosa]), is a Spanish YouTuber, linguistic popularizer and Spanish-language teacher. Since 2024, she has appeared on the TV programme Cifras y letras.

== Early life and career ==
A native of Guadalajara, Herraiz graduated in Translation and Interpreting at the University of Valladolid in 2015, specializing in English and German, and went on to pursue a master's degree at the University of Alcalá, becoming a teacher of Spanish as a second language. She moved to Berlin for five years to teach Spanish.

In September 2019, she started the YouTube channel Linguriosa (a portmanteau of lingüista curiosa, 'curious linguist'), originally dedicated to sharing teaching methods for Spanish grammar, but where she now deals with linguistic doubts and focuses on Spanish language history and etymology.

In early 2024, Herraiz began collaborating on the Televisión Española game show Cifras y letras (the Spanish version of Des chiffres et des lettres), broadcast on La 2, as a language expert. She also started a joint podcast with YouTube medical popularizer Sandra Ortonobes (La Hiperactina), titled Tú de ciencias y yo de letras.

In 2026, she launched her own language courses outside of her YouTube activity, with subscribers being eligible for ECTS university credits.

=== Recognition ===
In 2024, Herraiz was awarded the Dissemination Award (Premio a la Divulgación) at the Premios Archiletras de la Lengua. In 2026, Six magazine included her in its list of the "100 LGBTQ+ personalities of the year".

== Personal life ==
Herraiz is a vegetarian. She is openly lesbian and has a girlfriend. As of March 2025, she lives in A Coruña.
