= Grégory Baugé =

French cyclist (born 1985)

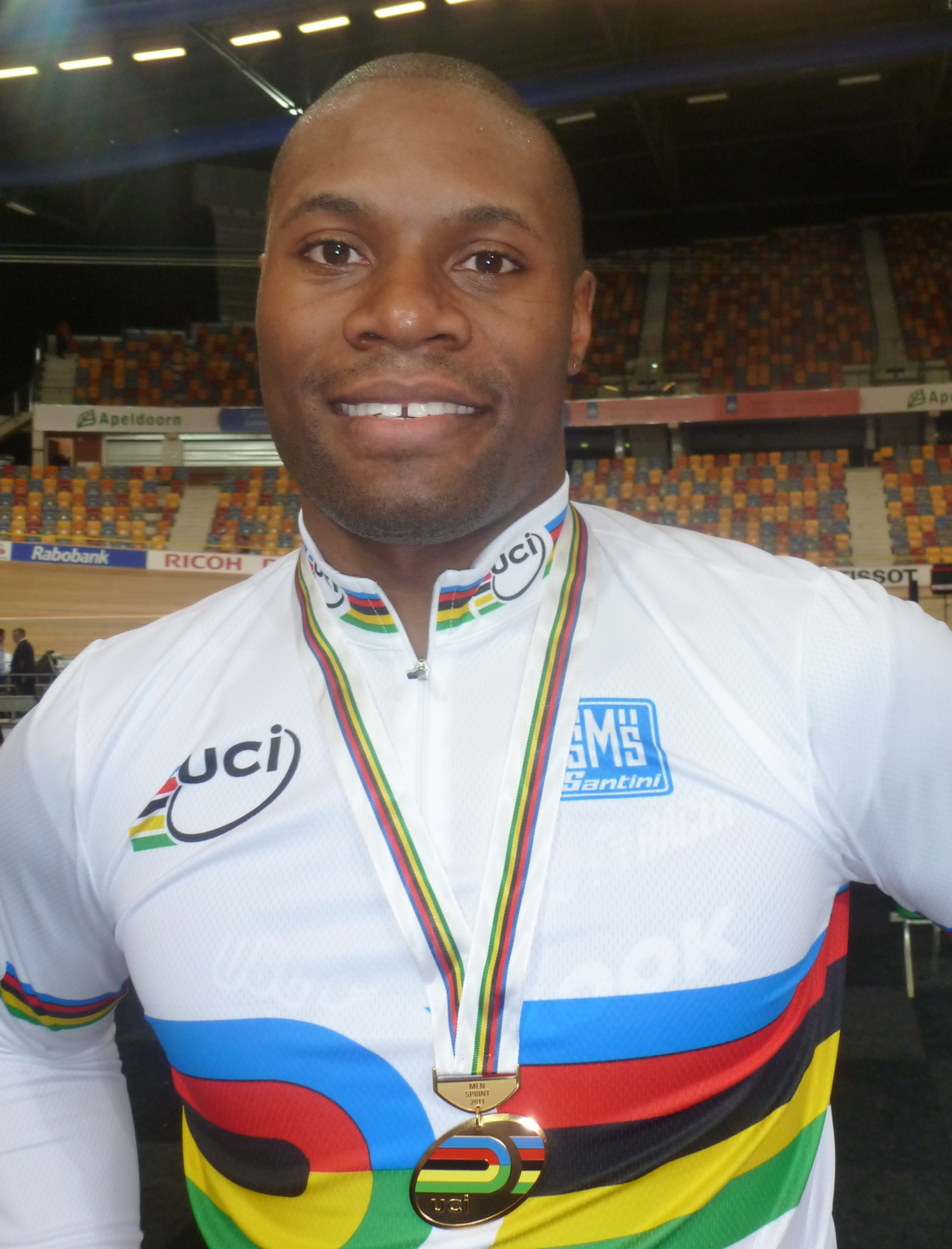

Personal information
- Nickname: The Black Pearl
- Born: 31 January 1985 (age 41) Maisons-Laffitte, France
- Height: 1.81 m (5 ft 11 in)
- Weight: 100 kg (220 lb)

Cycling career
- Sport: Cycling
- Discipline: Track
- Role: Rider
- Rider type: Sprinter
Medal record
Men's track cycling
Representing France
Olympic Games
Silver medal – second place	2008 Beijing	Team sprint
Silver medal – second place	2012 London	Team sprint
Silver medal – second place	2012 London	Sprint
Bronze medal – third place	2016 Rio de Janeiro	Team sprint
World Championships
Gold medal – first place	2006 Bordeaux	Team Sprint
Gold medal – first place	2007 Palma de Mallorca	Team Sprint
Gold medal – first place	2008 Manchester	Team Sprint
Gold medal – first place	2009 Pruszków	Sprint
Gold medal – first place	2009 Pruszków	Team Sprint
Gold medal – first place	2010 Ballerup	Sprint
Gold medal – first place	2012 Melbourne	Sprint
Gold medal – first place	2015 Yvelines	Sprint
Gold medal – first place	2015 Yvelines	Team sprint
Silver medal – second place	2007 Palma de Mallorca	Sprint
Silver medal – second place	2010 Ballerup	Team Sprint
Silver medal – second place	2012 Melbourne	Team sprint
Silver medal – second place	2019 Pruszków	Team sprint
Bronze medal – third place	2014 Cali	Team sprint
Disqualified	2011 Apeldoorn	Team Sprint
Disqualified	2011 Apeldoorn	Sprint
European Games
Silver medal – second place	2019 Minsk	Team sprint
European Championships
Gold medal – first place	2014 Baie-Mahault	Sprint
Silver medal – second place	2013 Apeldoorn	Team sprint
Silver medal – second place	2014 Baie-Mahault	Team sprint
Silver medal – second place	2019 Apeldoorn	Team sprint

Grégory Baugé (born 31 January 1985) is a French professional racing cyclist.

== Early life ==
Bauge first took up sport at the age of eight, playing football. His father enrolled him in the Aubergenville cycling school. At that time he took part in road races, mountain biking and trial cycling.

In 2000 he joined a cycling club in Yvelines. Aware of his qualities and encouraged by his father, he gradually left road cycling to concentrate on track cycling. in July 2001, he participated in the French National cadet (15–16 years) sprint championships where he was beaten in the final by Guillaume Blot.

In November 2001 he joined the Creteil Athletic Union, and permanently dedicated himself to the track. The following year, at 17, he entered the National Institute for Sport and Physical Education in Paris.

== Early career ==
He joined the France junior sprint team in 2002. With Mickaël Murat and Francois Pervis, he became World Champion in the Junior (17–18 years) team sprint discipline. With his coach Gerard Quintyn, he competed at the Athens Olympics in 2004. Bauge specialised in the opening lap of the team sprint.

At the 2008 Olympics, he won the silver medal in the team sprint.

== 2011 suspension ==
In January 2012 it was announced that Baugé had received a backdated 12-month suspension for missing doping tests. This meant that all his results for 2011 were nullified. This elevated Britain's Jason Kenny to gold medal position in the Sprint event at the 2011 World Championships, as well as giving the German Team Sprint team the gold medal in the same meet.

== 2012 ==
Baugé regained the World Championship Sprint title by beating defending champion Jason Kenny in the final of the 2012 event. Baugé went on to win two Olympic silver medals, in the team sprint (losing to Great Britain in the final for the second successive games), and in the individual sprint (being defeated by Kenny in the final).

== Major results ==
2002
1st in World Championship, Track, Team Sprint,. Juniors
2003
2nd in European Championship, Track, Keirin, Juniors, Moscow
1st in European Championship, Track, Sprint, Juniors, Moscow
2nd in National Championship, Track, 1 km, Juniors, France (FRA)
1st in National Championship, Track, Sprint, Juniors, France (FRA)
2nd in World Championship, Track, Sprint, Juniors, Moscow
1st in European Championship, Track, Team Pursuit, Elite, Moscow
2004
1st in National Championship, Track, Sprint, U23, France (FRA)
3rd in Manchester, Team Sprint (GBR)
1st in European Championship, Track, Team Pursuit, Elite, Valencia (ESP)
2005
2nd in Moscow, Keirin (RUS)
2nd in Moscow, Team Sprint (RUS)
2nd in Moscow, Sprint (RUS)
1st in Sydney, Team Sprint (AUS)
3rd in National Championship, Track, Team Sprint, Elite, France, Hyères (FRA)
3rd in European Championship, Track, Sprint, U23, Fiorenzuola
2006
1st in Los Angeles, Sprint (USA)
1st in Los Angeles, Team Sprint (USA)
1st in Sydney, Sprint (AUS)
2nd in Sydney, Team Sprint (AUS)
1st in World Championship, Track, Team Sprint, Elite, Bordeaux
2nd in European Championship, Track, Team Sprint, U23, Athens
2nd in European Championship, Track, Sprint, U23, Athens
1st in National Championship, Track, Team Sprint, Elite, France, Hyères (FRA)
2nd in National Championship, Track, Sprint, Elite, France, Hyères (FRA)
3rd in Moscow, Team Sprint (RUS)
2007
1st in Los Angeles, Sprint (USA)
2nd in Los Angeles, Team Sprint (USA)
1st in World Championship, Track, Team Sprint, Elite, Palma de Mallorca (SPA)
2nd in World Championship, Track, Sprint, Elite, Palma de Mallorca (SPA)
1st in European Championship, Track, Team Sprint, U23, Cottbus (GER)
1st in European Championship, Track, Sprint, U23, Cottbus (GER)
3rd in European Championship, Track, Keirin, U23, Cottbus (GER)
1st in National Championship, Track, Keirin, Elite, France (FRA)
1st in National Championship, Track, Sprint, Elite, France (FRA)
2nd in Beijing, Team Sprint (CHN)
2008
2nd in Los Angeles, Team Sprint (USA)
1st UCI Track Cycling World Championships, Team Sprint
2nd Olympics, Team Sprint
2009
1st in World Championship, Track, Sprint, Elite, Pruszków (POL)
2010
1st World Championship, Track, Sprint, Ballerup (DEN)
2011
~~1st World Championship, Track, Team sprint, Apeldoorn (NED)~~
~~1st World Championship, Track, Sprint, Apeldoorn (NED)~~
2012
1st World Championship, Track, Sprint, Melbourne (AUS)
2013
2nd European Championship, Track, Team sprint, Apeldoorn (NED)
2013
3rd World Championship, Track, Team sprint, Cali (COL)
2014
1st Sprint, Fenioux Piste International
1st Team sprint, Fenioux Piste International
2015
1st World Championship, Track, Team sprint, Paris (FRA)
1st World Championship, Track, Sprint, Paris (FRA)
