= Alfredo Moreno Caño =

Spanish cyclist

Alfredo Moreno Cano
Personal information
- Born: 23 June 1981 (age 45) Ceuta, Spain

Cycling career
- Sport: Cycling
- Discipline: Track cycling
- Role: Rider
- Rider type: sprinter

Alfredo Moreno Cano (born 23 June 1981) is a Spanish male track cyclist, riding for the national team. He competed in the team sprint event at the 2010 UCI Track Cycling World Championships.
