= Andrii Sach =

Ukrainian cyclist

Personal information
- Full name: Andrii Vadimovich Sach
- Born: 1 July 1990 (age 36)

Cycling career
- Sport: Cycling
- Discipline: Track cycling
- Role: Rider
- Rider type: team sprint

Andrii Vadimovich Sach (Ukrainian: Андрій Вадимович Сач; born 1 July 1990) is a Ukrainian male track cyclist. He competed in the team sprint event at the 2013 UCI Track Cycling World Championships.
