= Robert Förstemann =

German cyclist (born 1986)

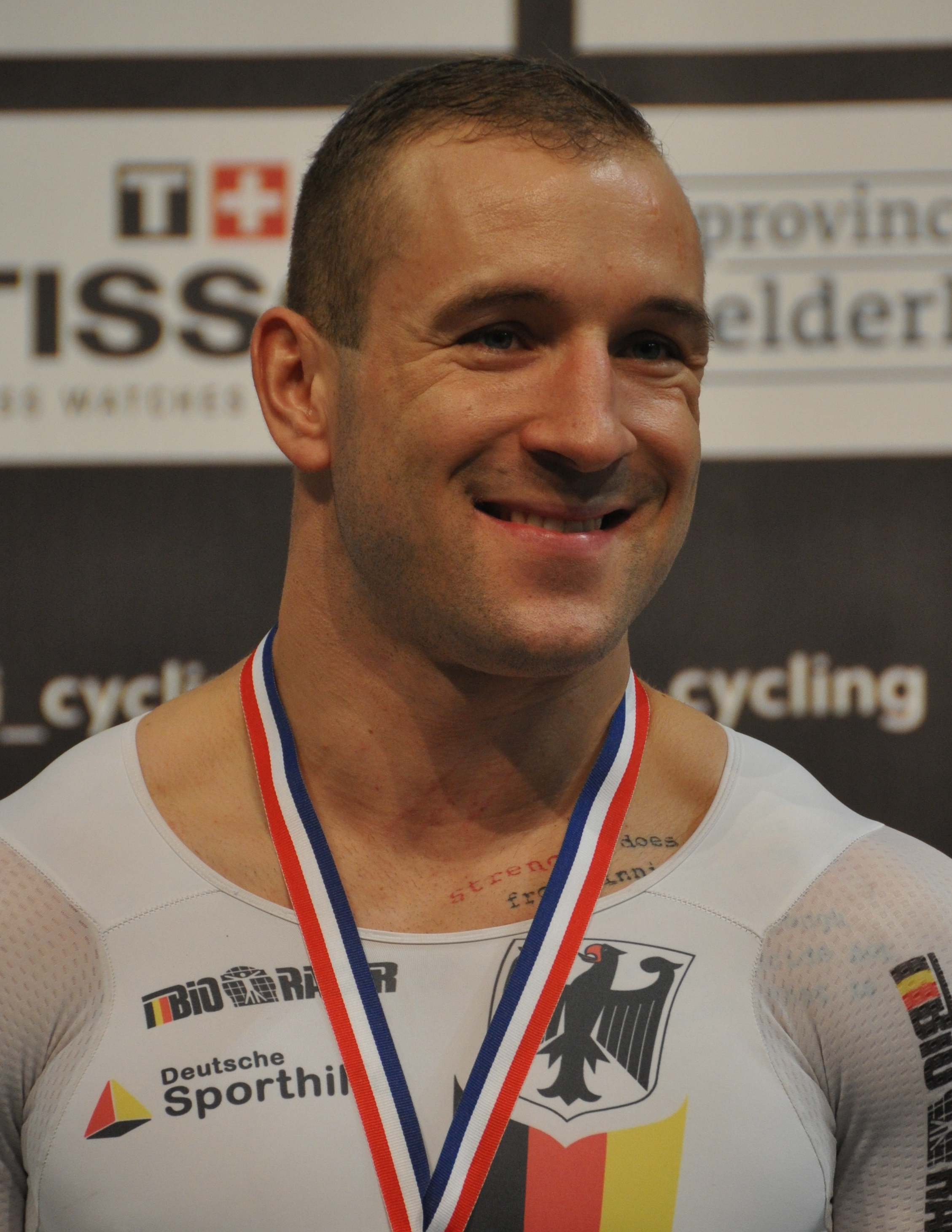

Personal information
- Born: 5 March 1986 (age 40) Greiz, East Germany
- Height: 1.74 m (5 ft 9 in)
- Weight: 100 kg (220 lb; 16 st)

Cycling career
- Sport: Cycling
- Discipline: Track
- Role: Rider
- Rider type: Sprinter
Medal record
Men's track cycling
Representing Germany
Olympic Games
| Bronze medal – third place | 2012 London | Team sprint |
World Championships
| Gold medal – first place | 2010 Ballerup | Team sprint |
| Silver medal – second place | 2014 Cali | Team sprint |
| Bronze medal – third place | 2007 Palma de Mallorca | Team sprint |
| Bronze medal – third place | 2009 Pruszków | Team sprint |
| Bronze medal – third place | 2015 Yvelines | Team sprint |
European Championships
| Gold medal – first place | 2010 Pruszków | Team Sprint |
| Gold medal – first place | 2011 Apeldoorn | Team sprint |
| Gold medal – first place | 2013 Apeldoorn | Team sprint |
| Gold medal – first place | 2014 Guadeloupe | Team sprint |
| Silver medal – second place | 2013 Apeldoorn | Sprint |
| Bronze medal – third place | 2014 Guadeloupe | Sprint |
| Bronze medal – third place | 2015 Grenchen | Team sprint |
| Bronze medal – third place | 2016 Yvelines | Team sprint |
Men's para-cycling
Paralympic Games
| Bronze medal – third place | 2024 Paris | Tandem B kilo |
Track World Championships
| Silver medal – second place | 2023 Glasgow | Tandem B sprint |
| Silver medal – second place | 2026 Apeldoorn | Mixed team sprint B |
| Bronze medal – third place | 2023 Glasgow | Tandem B kilo |

Robert Förstemann (born 5 March 1986) is a German track cyclist specialising in the sprint disciplines and world champion in team sprint in 2010. In his later career he has transitioned to Paralympic track cycling, representing Germany as a sighted 'pilot' in tandem events at the 2020 Summer Paralympics. In 2023, Förstemann piloted Thomas Ulbricht to a silver medal in the tandem B sprint and a bronze medal in the tandem B kilo at the 2023 UCI Para-cycling Track World Championships in Glasgow.

== Major results ==
| Date | Placing | Event | Competition | Location | Country |
|---|---|---|---|---|---|
| 2004 | 3 | Team sprint (Note: The other riders on the squad were Sebastian Döhrer and Dominik Harzheim) | National championships | Leipzig | Germany |
| 25 July 2005 | 3 | Team sprint (Note: The other riders on the squad were Daniel Giese and Marco Jager) | European Track Championships | Fiorenzuola | Italy |
| August 2005 | 3 | Team sprint (Note: The other riders on the squad were Sascha Jäger and Alexander Lesser) | National championships | Hamburg | Germany |
| 11 December 2005 | 3 | Team sprint (Note: The other riders on the squad were Maximilian Levy and Benjamin Wittmann) | World Cup | Manchester | United Kingdom |
| 19 August 2006 | 3 | Team sprint (Note: The other riders on the squad were Sebastian Döhrer and René Enders) | National championships | Cottbus | Germany |
| 25 February 2007 | 2 | Team sprint (Note: The other riders on the squad were Matthias John and Michael Seidenbecher) | World Cup | Manchester | United Kingdom |
| 29 March 2007 | 3rd place, bronze medalist(s) | Team sprint (Note: The other riders on the squad were Maximilian Levy and Stefan Nimke) | World Championships | Palma de Mallorca | Spain |
| 23 August 2007 | 2 | Team sprint (Note: The other riders on the squad were Carsten Bergemann and Benjamin Wittmann) | National championships | Berlin | Germany |
| 26 August 2007 | 3 | Sprint | National championships | Berlin | Germany |
| 30 November 2007 | 2 | Team sprint (Note: The other riders on the squad were Matthias John and Stefan Nimke) | World Cup | Sydney | Australia |
| 28 August 2008 | 2 | Team sprint (Note: The other riders on the squad were Stefan Nimke and Benjamin Wittmann) | National championships | Büttgen | Germany |
| 29 August 2008 | 1 | 1 km time trial | National championships | Büttgen | Germany |
| 30 August 2008 | 1 | Sprint | National championships | Büttgen | Germany |
| 11 December 2008 | 1 | Team sprint (Note: The other riders on the squad were Carsten Bergemann and Stefan Nimke) | World Cup | Cali | Colombia |
| 25 March 2009 | 3rd place, bronze medalist(s) | Team sprint (Note: The other riders on the squad were René Enders and Stefan Nimke) | World Championships | Pruszków | Poland |
| 8 July 2009 | 1 | Team sprint (Note: The other riders on the squad were Carsten Bergemann and Sascha Hübner) | National championships | Erfurt | Germany |
| 1 November 2009 | 3 | Team sprint (Note: The other riders on the squad were Stefan Nimke and Tobias Wachter) | World Cup | Manchester | United Kingdom |
| 11 December 2009 | 2 | Sprint | World Cup | Cali | Colombia |
| 12 December 2009 | 2 | Team sprint (Note: The other riders on the squad were Maximilian Levy and Mathias Stumpf) | World Cup | Cali | Colombia |
| 24 March 2010 | 1st place, gold medalist(s) | Team sprint (Note: The other riders on the squad were Maximilian Levy and Stefan Nimke) | World Championships | Ballerup | Denmark |
| 19 February 2012 | 3 | Sprint | World Cup | London | United Kingdom |
| 2 August 2012 | 3rd place, bronze medalist(s) | Team sprint (Note: The other riders on the squad were Maximilian Levy and René Enders) | Summer Olympics | London | United Kingdom |
| 18 October 2013 | 1st place, gold medalist(s) | Team sprint (Note: The other riders on the squad were Maximilian Levy and René Enders) | European Track Championships | Apeldoorn | Netherlands |
| 19 October 2013 | 2nd place, silver medalist(s) | Sprint | European Track Championships | Apeldoorn | Netherlands |
| 4 August 2023 | 3rd place, bronze medalist(s) | Kilo B1 | World Para-cyling Track Championships | Glasgow | United Kingdom |

^{
}

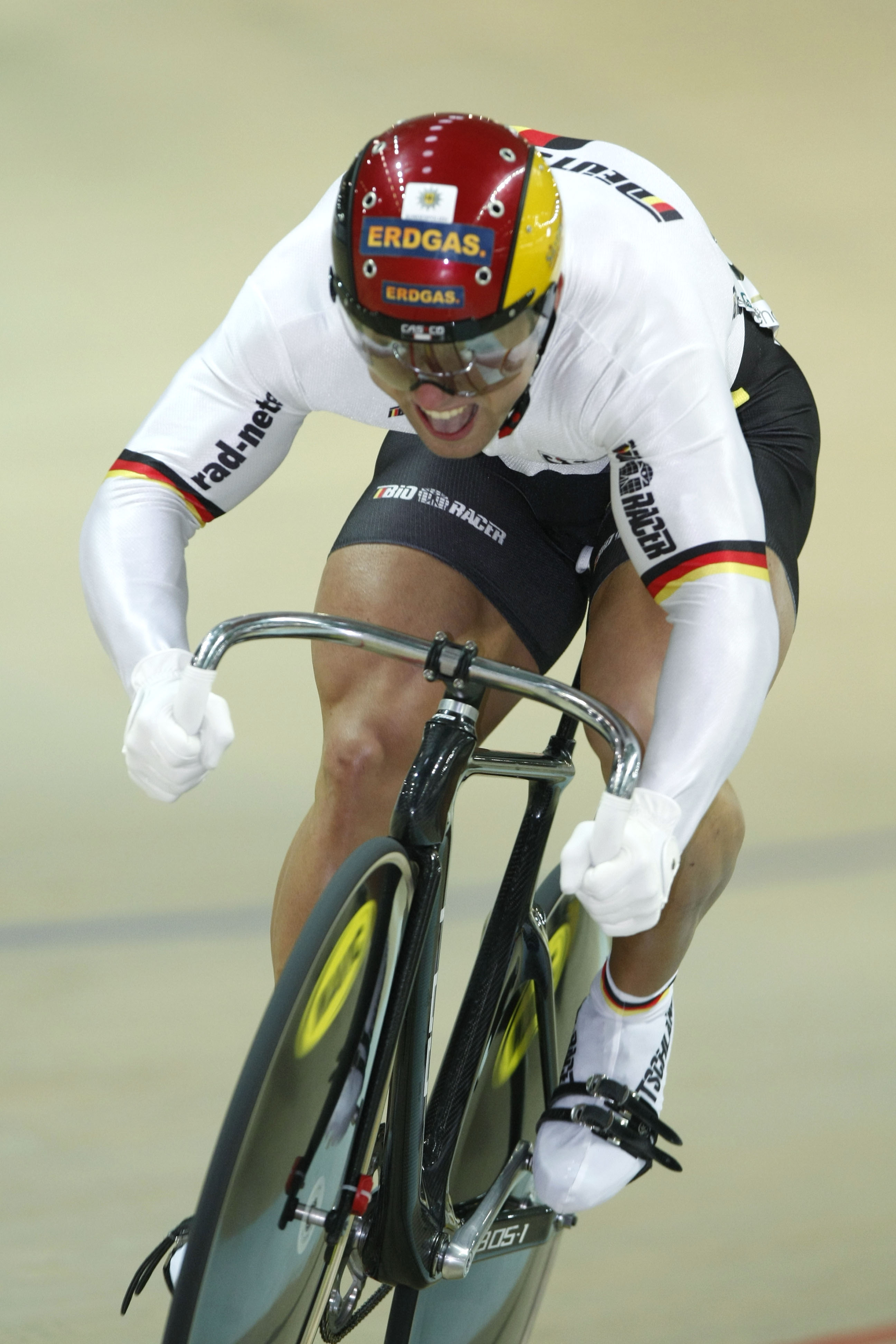
Förstemann in 2009

=== Olympics 2012 ===
The German Olympic team used a loophole in the International Cycling Union (UCI) regulations to include Förstemann as an additional member of their 2012 sprint cycling team. He was also included in the German team for the mountain bike event.

== Physique ==
In July 2012, a photograph of Förstemann's legs was widely circulated by the world's media during the 2012 Summer Olympics. Described as a 'quad off' with Olympic team-mate André Greipel, the photo showed his quad muscles compared with those of the road cyclist. His thighs were measured with a circumference of 73 centimetres (29 in). A circumference of 86 centimetres (34 in) has also been recorded, and the size of his quad muscles has led to him being called "Quadzilla" by some in his sport.
