= Kristjan Gregorič =

Slovenian track cyclist (born 1989)

Kristian Gregorič
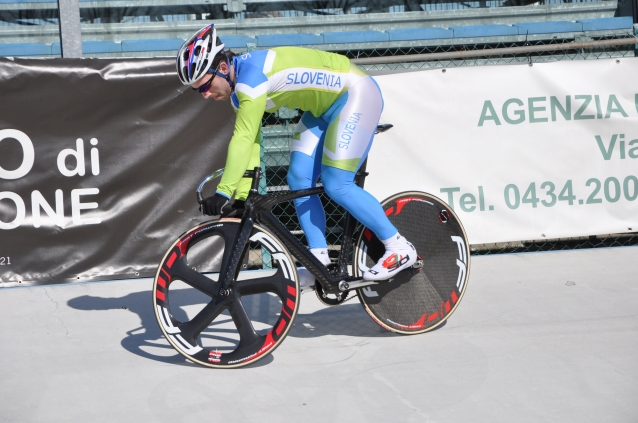

Personal information
- Full name: Kristian Gregorič
- Nickname: Kriko
- Born: 20 February 1989 (age 37) Šempeter pri Gorici, SFR Yugoslavia
- Height: 1.79 m (5 ft 10 in)
- Weight: 86 kg (190 lb; 13.5 st)

Cycling career
- Sport: Cycling
- Current team: ?
- Discipline: track/road
- Role: Rider
- Rider type: Sprinter

Amateur teams
- 2002-2006: Hit Universe of Fun
- 2007-2011: Cycling Team Adria Mobil

Professional teams
- 2013: Team Ceci Dream Bike
- 2014: SC Fagnano Nuova
- 2015: Loan to C.T. TOMACC
- 2016: ?
Medal record
Representing Slovenia
Men's track cycling
National Championships
Gold medal – first place	2003 Kranj	TT 500m
Gold medal – first place	2004 Kranj	TT 500m
Bronze medal – third place	2004 Kranj	Team Sprint
Gold medal – first place	2005 Kranj	TT 500m
Gold medal – first place	2005 Kranj	Team Sprint
Gold medal – first place	2005 Kranj	Sprint
Silver medal – second place	2007 Novo Mesto	Sprint
Gold medal – first place	2007 Novo Mesto	Team Sprint
Silver medal – second place	2011 Forli sprint meeting	Sprint

Kristian Gregorič (born 20 February 1989 in Šempeter pri Gorici) is a Slovenian track cyclist specialising in the sprint disciplines.

== Career ==
=== Race results ===
Date	Placing	Event	Competition	Location	Country
2003	1	Time trial 500m	National championships	Kranj	Slovenia
2004	1	Time trial 500m	National championships	Kranj	Slovenia
2004	3	Team sprint (Note: The other riders on the squad were Urban Jerkič and Marko Mermolja)	National championships	Kranj	Slovenia
2005	1	Time trial 500m	National championships	Kranj	Slovenia
2005	1	Team sprint (Note: The other riders on the squad were Urban Jerkič and Marko Mermolja)	National championships	Kranj	Slovenia
2005	1	Sprint 200m	National championships	Kranj	Slovenia
2007	2	Sprint 200m	National championships	Novo Mesto	Slovenia
2007	1	Team sprint (Note: The other riders on the squad were Gašper Klobučar and Gregor Bačar)	National championships	Novo Mesto	Slovenia
2009	26	Sprint 200m	European Championships	Minsk	Belarus
2009	23	Keirin	European Championships	Minsk	Belarus
2009	25	Sprint 200m	Grand Prix de Barcelona	Barcelona	Spain
2009	13	Keirin	Grand Prix de Barcelona	Barcelona	Spain
2009	5	Total	Giro d'Italia delle piste	Italia	Italy
2010	47	Sprint 200m	World Cup Beijing	Beijing	China
2010	21	Keirin	World Cup Beijing	Beijing	China
2010	24	Sprint 200m	Grand Prix Vienna	Austria	Austria
2010	21	Keirin	Grand Prix Vienna	Austria	Austria
2010	19	Sprint 200m	European Championships	Saint Petersburg	Russia
2010	17	Keirin	European Championships	Saint Petersburg	Russia
2011	16	Sprint 200m	European Championships	Anadia	Portugal
2011	2	Sprint 200m	Forli sprint meeting	Italia	Italy
2011	4	Sprint 200m	Pordenone sprint meeting	Italia	Italy
2012	48	Sprint 200m	World Cup London	London	United Kingdom
2013	DNF	Sprint 200m	Fiorenzuola 6 giorni	Italia	Italy
2013	13	Sprint 200m	Revolution series	Glasgow	Scotland

== Personal life ==
Gregorič was born in Šempeter pri Gorici, present day Slovenia. He competed 10 years on the road races, then in the under-23 category decided to continue the track races (sprint 200 metres and KEIRIN). He is the only Slovenian representative in this discipline with high successful. He is a serious contender for the Olympic Games in Rio 2016.
