= Matthijs Büchli =

Dutch racing cyclist

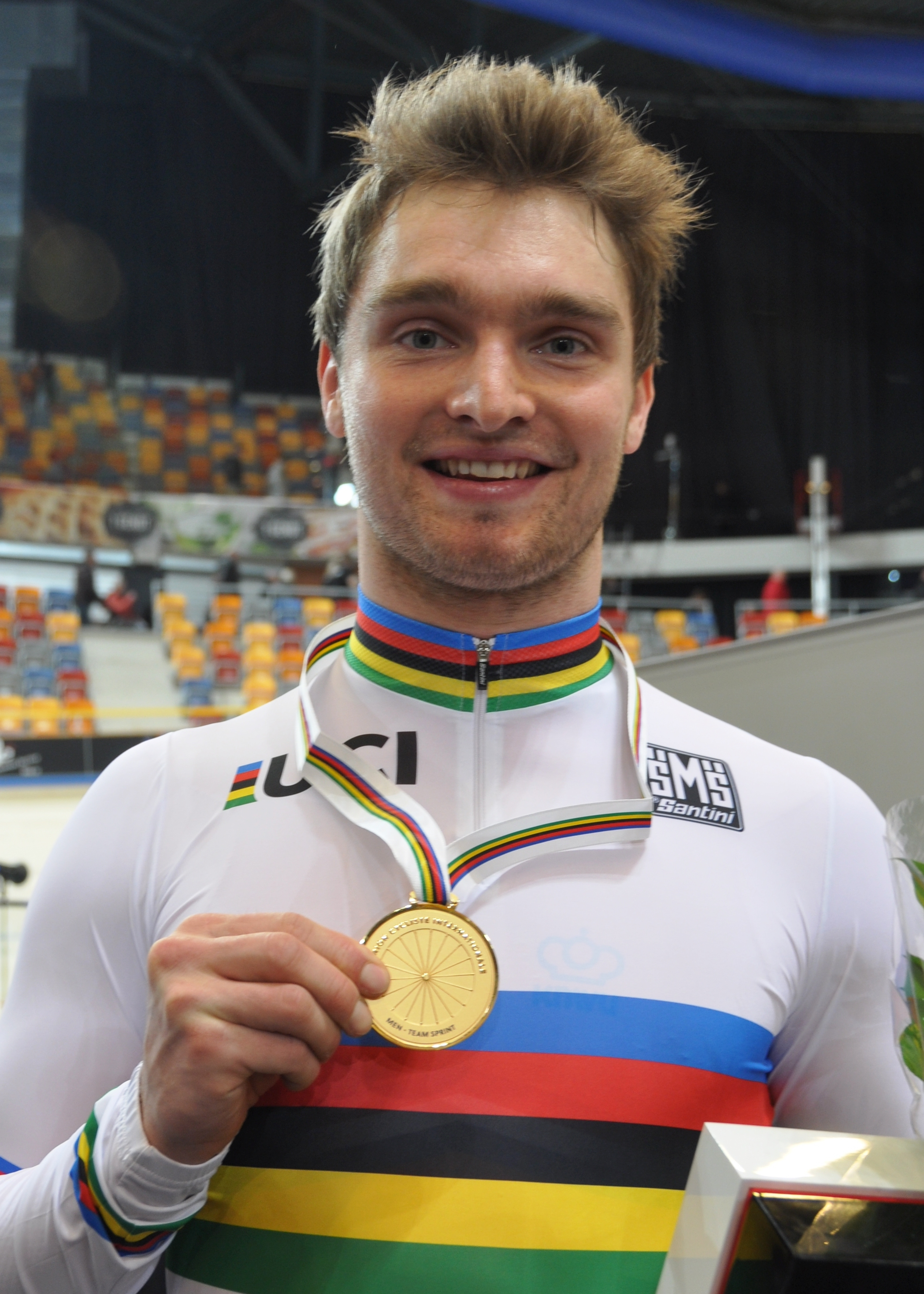
- Büchli in 2018

Personal information
- Full name: Matthijs Büchli
- Born: 13 December 1992 (age 33) Haarlem, Netherlands
- Height: 1.88 m (6 ft 2 in)
- Weight: 84 kg (185 lb)

Cycling career
- Sport: Cycling
- Current team: BEAT CC p/b Saxo
- Disciplines: Track; Road
- Role: Rider
- Rider type: Sprinter

Professional team
- 2017–: BEAT Cycling Club
Medal record
Men's track cycling
Representing the Netherlands
Olympic Games
Gold medal – first place	2020 Tokyo	Team sprint
Silver medal – second place	2016 Rio de Janeiro	Keirin
World Championships
Gold medal – first place	2018 Apeldoorn	Team sprint
Gold medal – first place	2019 Pruszków	Keirin
Gold medal – first place	2019 Pruszków	Team sprint
Gold medal – first place	2020 Berlin	Team sprint
Silver medal – second place	2017 Hong Kong	Team sprint
Silver medal – second place	2016 London	Team sprint
Bronze medal – third place	2014 Cali	Keirin
Bronze medal – third place	2013 Minsk	Keirin
European Championships
Gold medal – first place	2018 Glasgow	1 km time trial
Gold medal – first place	2019 Apeldoorn	Team sprint
Silver medal – second place	2014 Baie-Mahault	Keirin
Bronze medal – third place	2017 Berlin	Team sprint
Bronze medal – third place	2019 Apeldoorn	Keirin

Matthijs Büchli (born 13 December 1992) is a Dutch road and track cyclist, who currently rides for UCI Track Team BEAT CC p/b Saxo.

He became world champion in the keirin at the 2018 UCI Track Cycling World Championships. In 2016, Büchli won the silver medal in the men's keirin at the Olympic Games in Rio de Janeiro, despite experiencing a severe knee injury only five months before the Olympic Games. Büchli was also a part of the team that won the gold medal at the 2020 Summer Olympics in the team sprint event.

Büchli has been a member of the commercial team of BEAT CC p/b Saxo together with Theo Bos since 2017.

== Major results ==
2011
National Championships

2nd Kilo
2nd Omnium
3rd Keirin

2012
National Championships

1st Sprint
3rd Keirin

2013
1st Keirin, 2012–13 UCI Track Cycling World Cup, Aguascalientes
3rd Keirin, UCI World Championships
2014
3rd Keirin, UCI World Championships
2016
2nd Keirin, Summer Olympics
2nd Team sprint, UCI World Championships
2017
2nd Team sprint, UCI World Championships
3rd Team sprint, UEC European Championships
2018
1st Team sprint, UCI World Championships
National Championships

1st Sprint
3rd Team sprint

2019
UCI Track Cycling World Championships

1st Team sprint
1st Keirin

2021
1st Team sprint, Olympic Games

== Further information ==
- "Double delight for GB cyclists.(Sport)." Birmingham Mail (England). MGN Ltd. 2013. HighBeam Research. 30 April 2013
- "Kenny grabs keirin crown; UPDATE.(Sport)." Daily Record (Glasgow, Scotland). MGN Ltd. 2013. 30 April 2013
- "Yates wins points race at track cycling worlds." Yakima Herald-Republic. Yakima Herald-Republic. 2013. 30 April 2013
