= Itmar Esteban =

Spanish cyclist

Personal information
- Full name: Itmar Esteban Herraiz
- Born: 19 November 1983 (age 42) Barcelona
- Height: 177 cm (5 ft 10 in)
- Weight: 87 kg (192 lb)

Cycling career
- Sport: Cycling
- Current team: AE Genesis Cycling Team
- Discipline: Track cycling
- Role: Rider
- Rider type: sprint

Itmar Esteban Herraiz (born 19 November 1983) is a Spanish male track cyclist, riding for the national team. He competed in the sprint events at the UCI Track Cycling World Championships between 2007 and 2011.

As a master, he has multiple medals in Sprint: bronze in 2024 in Roubaix (40-44 group age), silver in 2019 in Manchester (35-39 group age) and in 2025 in Roubaix (40-44 group age) and gold and World Champion in 2023 in Manchester (40-44 group age), as well as bronze medalist in TT event in 2023 in Manchester and silver in 2025 in Roubaix (750m - 40-44 group age).
