= Valentin Savitskiy =

Russian track cyclist

Personal information
- Born: 25 December 1984 (age 41)

Cycling career
- Sport: Cycling
- Discipline: Track cycling
- Role: Rider
- Rider type: sprint keirin

Valentin Savitskiy (born 25 December 1984) is a Russian male track cyclist. He competed in the sprint event and keirin event at the 2013 and 2014 UCI Track Cycling World Championships.
