= Nikita Shurshin =

Russian cyclist

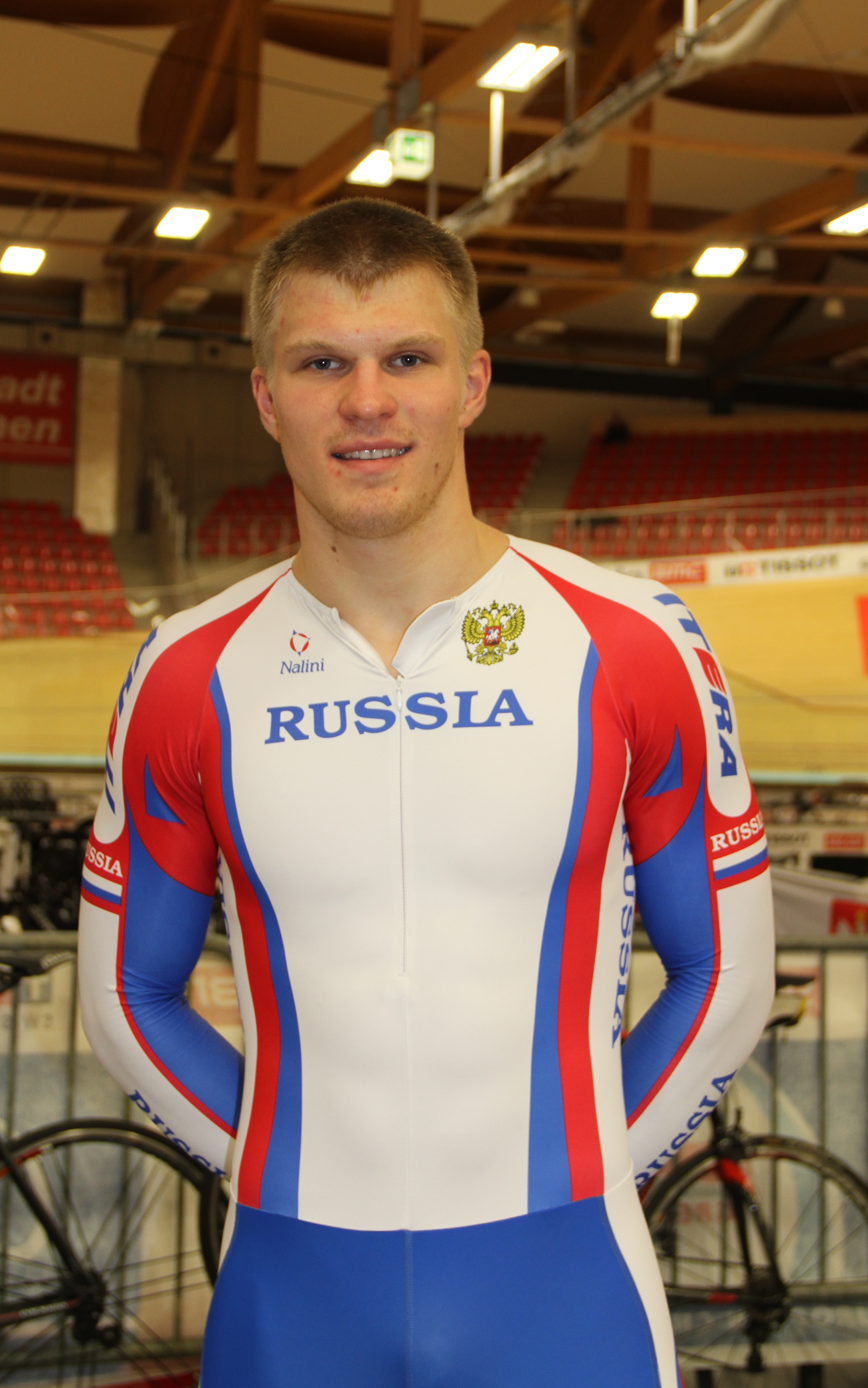
- Nikita Shurshin (2015)

Personal information
- Full name: Nikita Aleksandrovich Shurshin
- Born: 8 April 1993 (age 33) Moscow, Russia

Cycling career
- Sport: Cycling
- Role: Rider
Medal record
European Championships
Bronze medal – third place	2014 Baie-Mahault	Team sprint

Nikita Aleksandrovich Shurshin (Russian: Никита Александрович Шуршин; born 8 April 1993) is a Russian professional racing cyclist. He rode at the 2015 UCI Track Cycling World Championships.
