= Tobias Wächter =

German cyclist

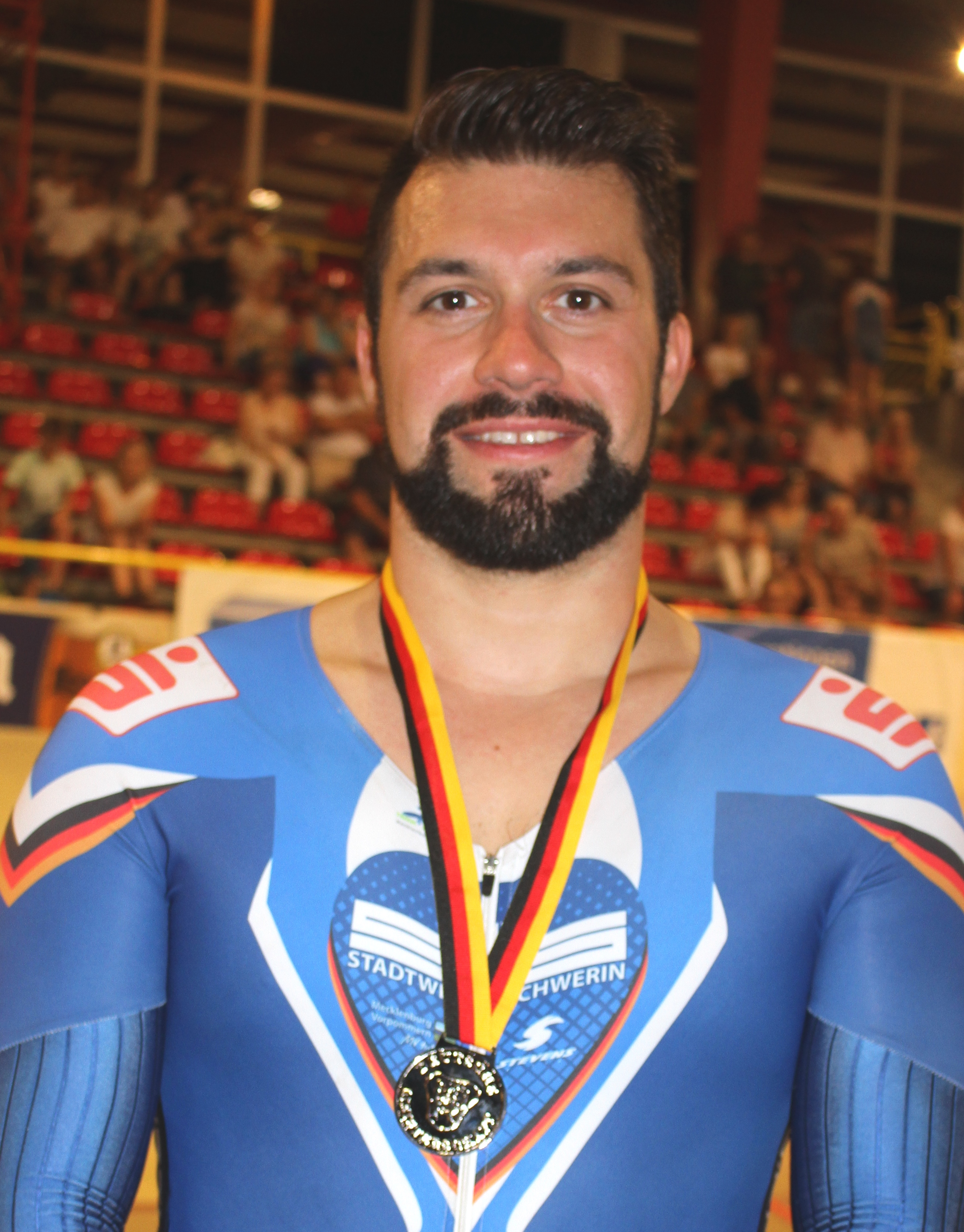
- Wächter in 2016

Personal information
- Born: 3 August 1988 (age 38)

Cycling career
- Sport: Cycling
- Discipline: Track cycling
- Role: Rider
- Rider type: Keirin

Tobias Wächter (born 3 August 1988) is a German track cyclist. He competed in the keirin event at the 2014 UCI Track Cycling World Championships.
