= Christos Volikakis =

Greek cyclist (born 1988)

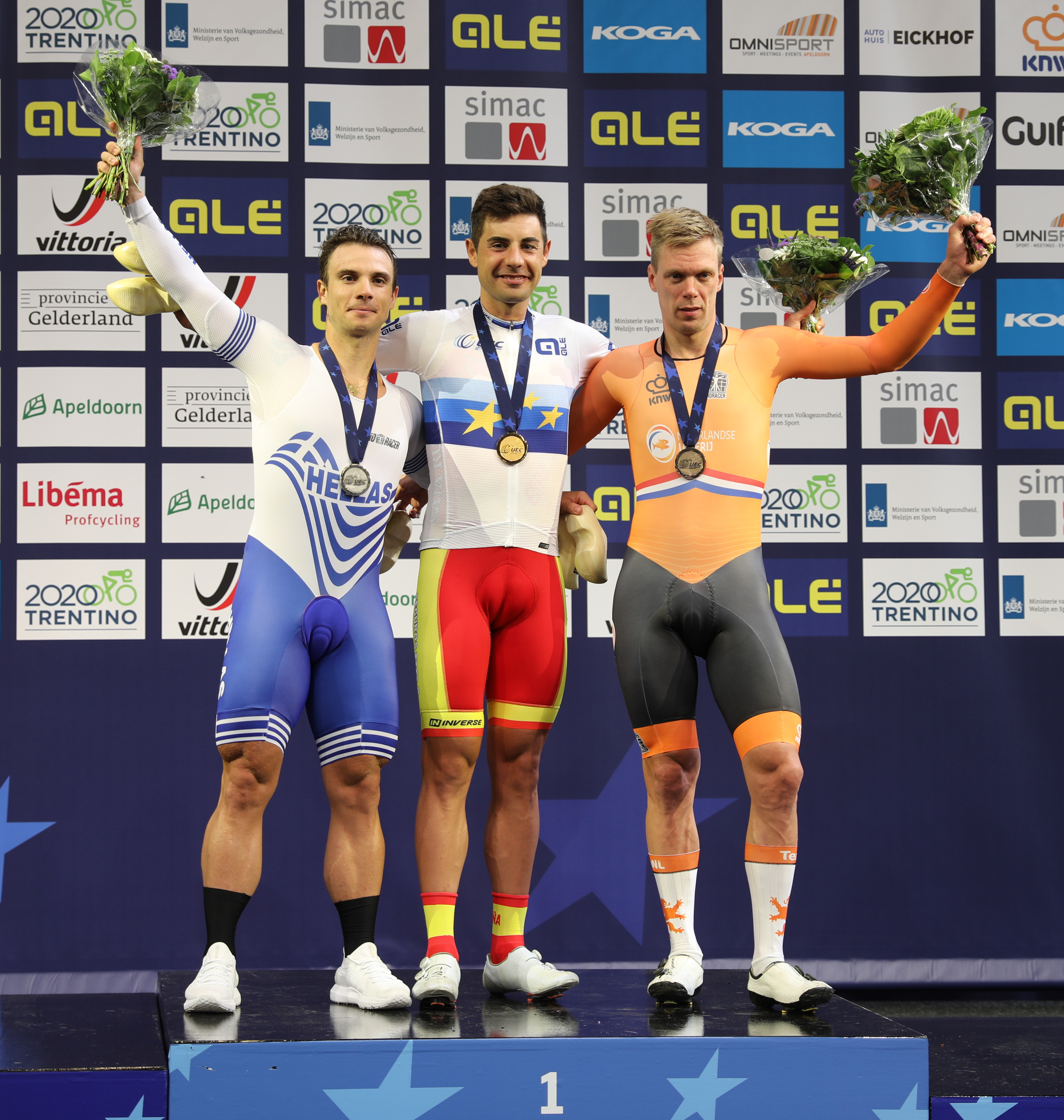

Personal information
- Full name: Christos Volikakis
- Born: 25 March 1988 (age 38) Volos, Greece

Cycling career
- Sport: Cycling
- Discipline: Track
- Role: Rider
- Rider type: Sprinter (2005–2016), Endurance (2016–today)
Medal record
Men's track cycling
Representing Greece
World Championships
Bronze medal – third place	2008 Manchester	Keirin
European Championships
Silver medal – second place	2011 Apeldoorn	Keirin
Silver medal – second place	2016 Yvelines	Elimination
Silver medal – second place	2019 Apeldoorn	Scratch
Bronze medal – third place	2012 Panevėžys	Sprint
European Games
Gold medal – first place	Minsk 2019	Scratch Race
Gold medal – first place	Minsk 2019	Points Race

Christos Volikakis (Greek: Χρήστος Βολικάκης; born 25 March 1988, in Volos) is a Greek track cyclist. He was the leader of the UCI Track Cycling World Cup Classics 2011–2012 in Keirin.

== Biography ==
Christos Volikakis is a Greek track cyclist, the most successful of the 2000s, particularly in the speed disciplines. In 2005, as a junior, he became Greek champion in three track discipline (speed, team sprint and team pursuit) and won a title on the road (team time trial).

In 2005, he became the World Champion in keirin at the UCI Juniors Track World Championships in Vienna. He also won two medals at the Junior European Championships 2006 and 2007. In 2007, he won two championship events at the Athens Open, in keirin and team sprint.

At the 2008 UCI Track Cycling World Championships in Manchester, he finished third in the keirin and took the bronze medal.

Between 2006 and 2011, he won eleven national titles.

He won the 2nd place in Keirin at the UCI Track World Cup 2007–2008 in Los Angeles, USA.

In 2008 he represented Greece at the Beijing Olympics in the men's keirin.

He won the gold medal in keirin at the UCI Track World Cup 2011–2012 in Astana, Kazakhstan.

He has also won the silver medal in keirin at the European Elite Track Championship 2011 that was held in Apeldoorn, Netherlands.

In 2012, he again competed in the Olympics, in the men's keirin. He competed in the same event at the 2016 Olympics.

On 15 March 2024 cyclist Christos Volikakis was informed of an Adverse Analytical Finding on a re-analysis of a sample from the 2016 Rio Olympics. The athlete has since requested an analysis of the B sample.

== Career highlights ==
=== Greek Championship ===
1. 2003 2nd in National Championship, Road, ITT, Novices, Greece, Volos (GRE)
2. 2003 2nd in National Championship, Road, Novices, Greece, Volos (GRE)
3. 2004 1st in National Championship, Track, 500 m, Novices, Greece, Athens (GRE)
4. 2004 3rd in National Championship, Road, ITT, Novices, Greece, Dervenochoria (GRE)
5. 2004 1st in National Championship, Road, Novices, Greece, Dervenochoria (GRE)
6. 2005 1st n National Championship, Track, Sprint, Juniors, Greece, Athens (GRE)
7. 2005 2nd in National Championship, Track, 1 km, Juniors, Greece (GRE)
8. 2005 1st in National Championship, Track, Team Pursuit, Juniors, Greece (GRE) + Vasileios Galanis, Alexandros Floros, Athanassios Evdokiou,
9. 2005 1st in National Championship, Track, Team Sprint, Juniors, Greece (GRE) + Vasileios Galanis, Alexandros Floros,
10. 2005 1st in National Championship, Road, TTT, Juniors, Greece, Thiva (GRE) + Athanassios Evdokiou, Vasileios Galanis, Alexandros Floros,
11. 2006 1st in National Championship, Track, Team Sprint, Juniors, Greece (GRE) + Zafeiris Volikakis, Nikolaos Dimotakis,
12. 2006 1st in Nation Championship, Track, 1 km, Juniors, Greece (GRE)
13. 2006 2nd in National Championship, Track, Sprint, Juniors, Greece (GRE)
14. 2006 5th in OXI Memorial Climb Race, Juniors, Bafi, Parnitha (GRE)
15. 2007 2nd in National Championship, Track, 1 km, Elite, Greece (GRE)
16. 2007 2nd in National Championship, Track, Sprint, Elite, Greece (GRE)
17. 2007 1st in National Championship, Track, Team Sprint, Elite, Greece (GRE) + Zafeiris Volikakis, Vasileios Galanis,
18. 2007 1st in National Championship, Track, Keirin, Elite, Greece (GRE)
19. 2009 1st in National Championship, Track, 1 km, Elite, Greece, Athens (GRE)
20. 2009 1st in National Champioip, Track, Keirin, Elite, Greece, Athens (GRE)
21. 2011 1st in National Championsh Track, Keirin, Elite, Greece (GRE)
22. 2011 1st in National Championship, Track, Team Pursuit, Elite, Greece (GRE) + Apostolos Bouglas, Alexandros Papaderos, Stavros Papadimitrakis,
23. 2011 1st in National Championship, Track, Team Sprint, Elite, Greece (GRE) + Georgios Bouglas, Zafeiris Volikakis,
24. 2011 1st in National Championship, Track, Sprint, Elite, Greece (GRE)
25. 2011 1st in National Championship, Track, 1, Elite, Greece (GRE)

=== Balkan Open ===
1. 2007 1st in Athens Open Balkan Championship, Track, Team Sprint, Elite/U23, Greece, Athens (GRE) + Athanasios Mantzouranis, Panagiotis Voukelatos,
2. 2007 2nd in Athens Open Balkan Championship, Track, Sprint, Elite/U23, Greece, Athens (GRE)
3. 2007 1st in Athens Open Balkan Championship, TracKeirin, Elite/U23, Greece, Athens (GRE)

=== European Juniors/U23 Championship ===
1. 2005 2nd in European Championship, Track, Keirin, Juniors, Fiorenzuola
2. 2006 2nd in European Championship, Track, Team Sprint, Juniors, Athens
3. 2006 6th in European Championship, Track, Keirin, Juniors, Athens
4. 2006 9th in European Championship, Track, Scratch Race, Juniors, Athens
5. 2007 4th in European Championship, Track, Keirin, U23, Cottbuss
6. 2008 4th in European Championship, Track, Keirin, U23, Pruszków
7. 2009 3rd in European Championship, Track, Keirin, U23, Minsk

=== World Grand Prix ===
1. 2011 3rd in Dudenhofen, Keirin (GER)
2. 2011 1st in Moscow, Keirin (RUS)
3. 2011 1st in Mos, Sprint (RUS)

=== European Elite Championship ===
1. 2011 2nd in European Championship, Track, Keirin, Elite, Apeldoorn

=== UCI World Cup Classics ===
1. 2008 2nd in Los Angeles, Keirin (USA)
2. 2008 5th in Sydney, Keirin (AUS)
3. 2010 4th in Melbourne, Keirin (AUS)
4. 2010 8th in Cali, Keirin (COL)
5. 2011 1st in Astana, Keirin (KAZ)

=== UCI World Championships ===
1. 2005 1st in World Championship, Track, Keirin, Juniors, Wien
2. 2006 3rd in World Championship, Track, Team Sprint, Juniors, Gent
3. 2006 6th in World Championship, Track, Keirin, Juniors, Gent
4. 2008 3rd in World Championship, Track, Keirin, Elite
5. 2009 8th in World Championship, Track, Keirin, Elite, Pruszków
6. 2010 13th in World Championship, Track, Team Sprint, Elite, København
7. 2010 13th in World Championship, Track, Keirin, Elite, København
8. 2010 36th in World Championship, Track, Sprint, Elite, København
