= Matthew Crampton =

English cyclist

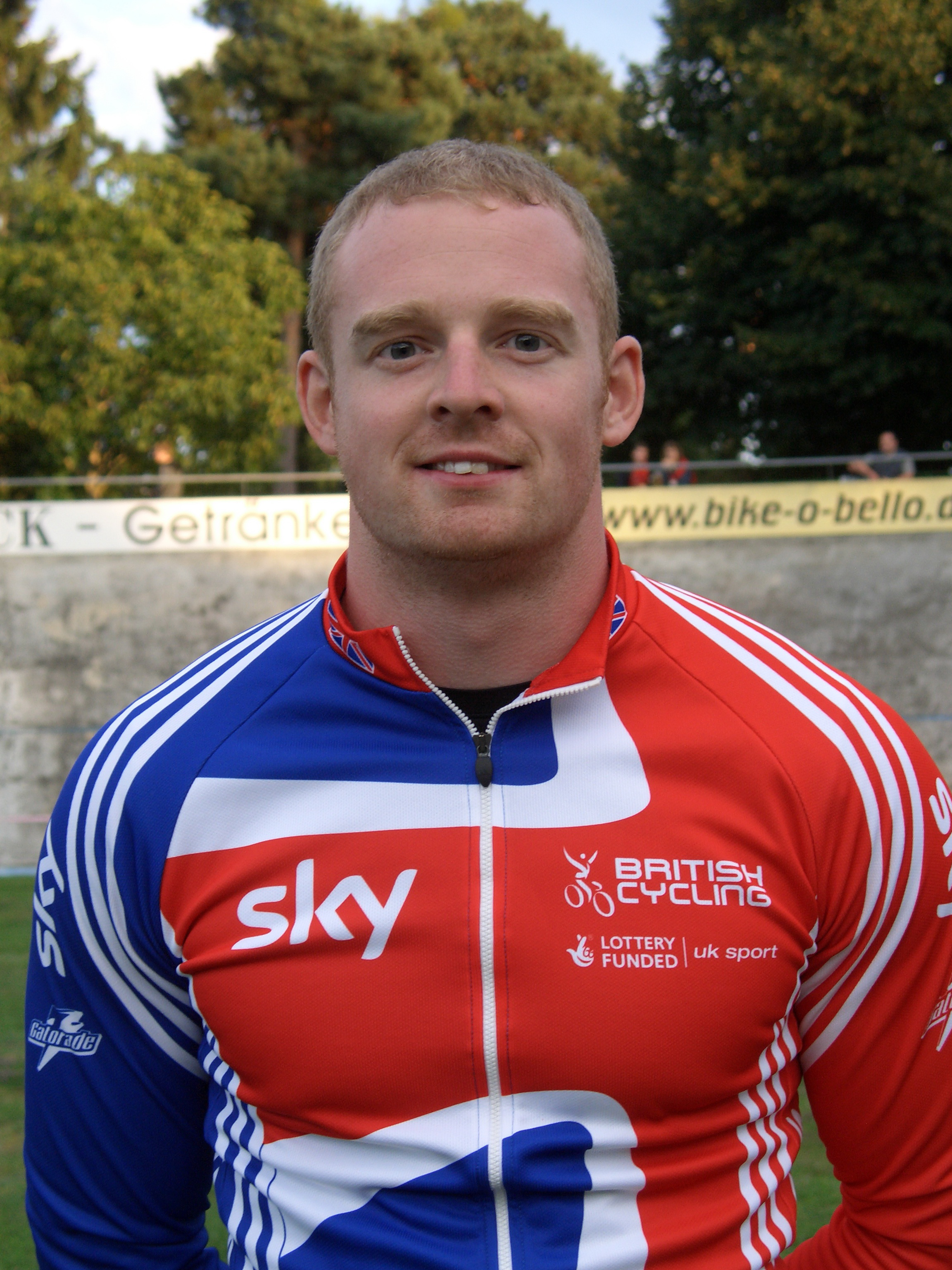

Personal information
- Full name: Matthew Nicholas Crampton
- Born: 23 May 1986 (age 40) Manchester, England
- Height: 1.86 m (6 ft 1 in)
- Weight: 82 kg (181 lb; 12.9 st)

Cycling career
- Sport: Cycling
- Current team: Sky Track Cycling
- Discipline: Track
- Role: Rider
- Rider type: Sprinter

Amateur team
- 2006: Sportcity Velo

Professional teams
- 2008: Science in Sport
- 2010–2013: Sky Track Cycling
Medal record
Men's track cycling
Representing Great Britain
World Championships
Silver medal – second place	2009 Pruszków	Team sprint
Silver medal – second place	2011 Apeldoorn	Team sprint
European Championships
Gold medal – first place	2011 Apeldoorn	Keirin
Silver medal – second place	2010 Pruszków	Keirin
Bronze medal – third place	2010 Pruszków	Team Sprint
Bronze medal – third place	2012 Panevėžys	Team Sprint
European Track Championships
Gold medal – first place	2004 Valencia	Sprint (Junior)
Gold medal – first place	2004 Valencia	Keirin (Junior)
Representing England
Commonwealth Games
Silver medal – second place	2006 Melbourne	Team sprint
Commonwealth Youth Games
Silver medal – second place	2004 Bendigo	Kilometer Time Trial
Silver medal – second place	2004 Bendigo	Keirin
Bronze medal – third place	2004 Bendigo	Sprint

Matthew "Matt" Nicholas Crampton (born 23 May 1986) is an English former track cyclist for Sky Track Cycling. He was a member of British Cycling's Olympic Podium Programme, and represented Great Britain at a number of major events. Crampton specialised in track sprinting and competed in the individual sprint, team sprint, keirin and kilo events.

== Biography ==
Born in Manchester, Crampton won the junior sprint and keirin events at the 2004 European Track Championships. Crampton competed at the Youth Commonwealth Games in Bendigo, Australia in 2004, winning a silver medal in the keirin.

He went on to take the silver medal as a member of England's Team Sprint squad at the 2006 Commonwealth Games. 2007 saw Crampton take the silver medal in the keirin and bronze in the team sprint at the European Track Championships, this time riding in the under 23 category.

He won a bronze medal in the individual sprint at the first round of the 2008–2009 UCI Track Cycling World Cup Classics at Manchester on 1 November 2008. He also won the Japanese Keirin Association Race the next day.

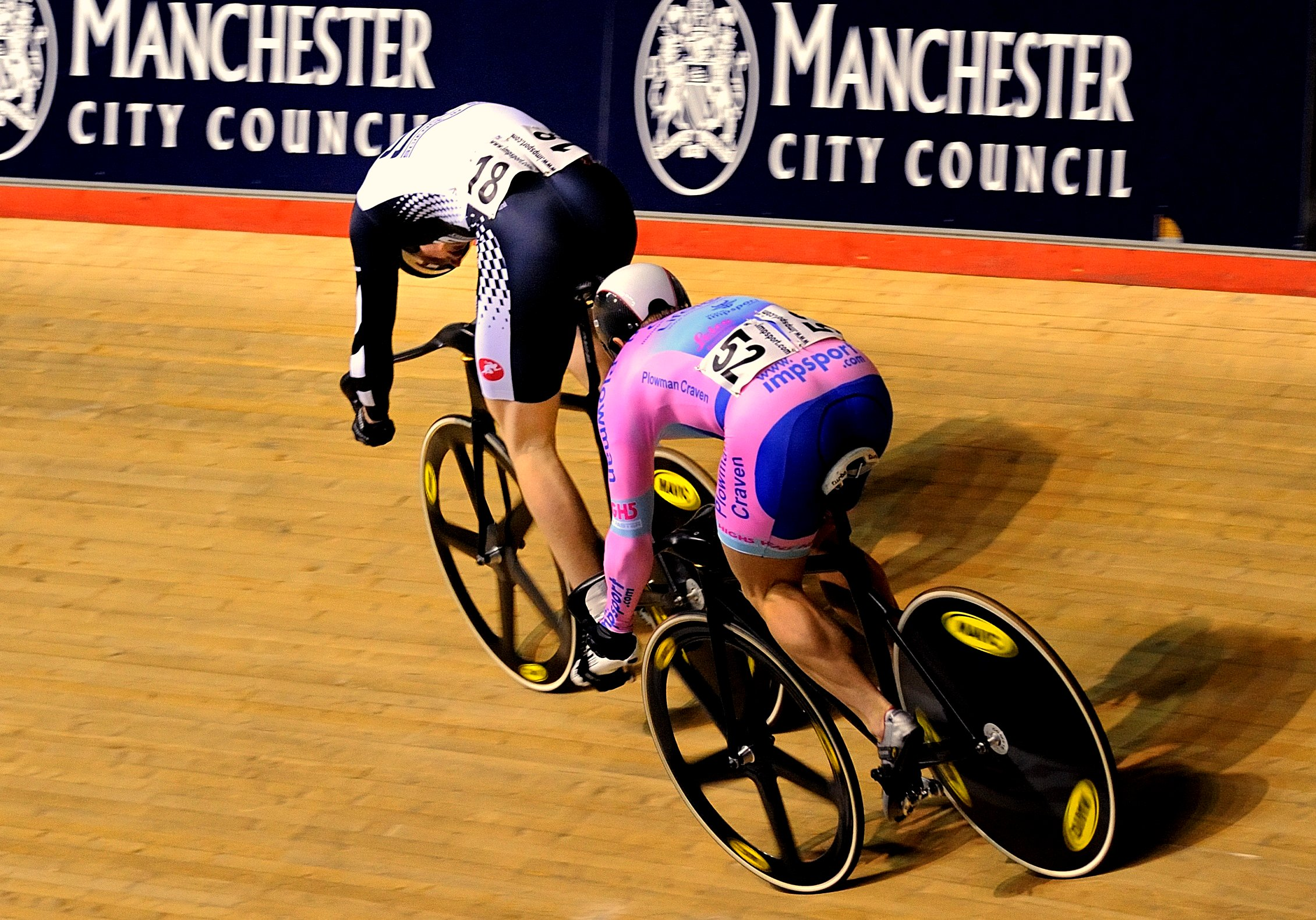
Matthew Crampton versus Craig MacLean in the individual sprint at the 2008 British National Track Championships.

On 15 November 2008 he competed in the Revolution 21 event in Manchester. He won both events he was entered in, the Sprint and the Keirin. Other riders present were Jason Kenny, Ross Edgar and Jamie Staff.

He won silver in the men's team sprint at the 2009 UCI Track Cycling World Championships with teammates Jamie Staff and Jason Kenny. He also won silver in the same event two years later with Chris Hoy and Jason Kenny, after the French squad were stripped of the world title and the British team were promoted from their original bronze medals.

At the 2011 UEC European Track Championships, Crampton won the gold medal in the keirin.

He won gold in keirin and placed second at team sprint in Aguascalientes at 2013–14 UCI Track Cycling World Cup.

In November 2016 Crampton announced his retirement from competition, indicating that he would continue to be involved in the sport as a coach. In 2018 he was appointed Head Coach of the WAIS Cycling Program.

== Family ==
He is the older brother of Jessica Crampton.
