= UCI Track Cycling World Championships – Men's team sprint =

The UCI Track Cycling World Championships – Men's team sprint is the team sprint competition for men held annually at the UCI Track Cycling World Championships. Since its introduction at the 1995 championships, as of 2020, France have won the gold medal on eleven occasions. Arnaud Tournant has the most wins with 9 gold medals.

== Medalists ==
Championships	Winner	Runner-up	Third
1995 Bogotá	Jens Fiedler; Michael Hübner; Jan van Eijden; Germany	Florian Rousseau; Hervé Robert Thuet; Benoit Vétu; France	William Clay; Erin Hartwell; Marty Nothstein; United States
1996 Manchester	Darryn Hill; Shane Kelly; Gary Neiwand; Australia	Jens Fiedler; Michael Hübner; Sören Lausberg; Germany	Florian Rousseau; Laurent Gané; Hervé Robert Thuet; France
1997 Perth	Vincent Le Quellec; Florian Rousseau; Arnaud Tournant; France	Jan van Eijden; Sören Lausberg; Eyk Pokorny; Germany	Danny Day; Sean Eadie; Shane Kelly; Australia
1998 Bordeaux	Vincent Le Quellec; Florian Rousseau; Arnaud Tournant; France	Danny Day; Shane Kelly; Graham Sharman; Australia	Sören Lausberg; Stefan Nimke; Eyk Pokorny; Germany
1999 Berlin	Laurent Gané; Florian Rousseau; Arnaud Tournant; France	Chris Hoy; Craig MacLean; Jason Queally; Great Britain	Sören Lausberg; Stefan Nimke; Eyk Pokorny; Germany
2000 Manchester	Laurent Gané; Florian Rousseau; Arnaud Tournant; France	Chris Hoy; Craig MacLean; Jason Queally; Great Britain	José Antonio Escuredo; Salvador Meliá; José Antonio Villanueva; Spain
2001 Antwerp	Laurent Gané; Florian Rousseau; Arnaud Tournant; France	Ryan Bayley; Jobie Dajka; Sean Eadie; Australia	Chris Hoy; Craig MacLean; Jason Queally; Great Britain
2002 Copenhagen	Chris Hoy; Craig MacLean; Jamie Staff; Great Britain	Ryan Bayley; Jobie Dajka; Sean Eadie; Australia	Sören Lausberg; Carsten Bergemann; Jens Fiedler; Germany
2003 Stuttgart	Jens Fiedler; Carsten Bergemann; René Wolff; Germany	Mickaël Bourgain; Laurent Gané; Arnaud Tournant; France	Chris Hoy; Craig MacLean; Jamie Staff; Great Britain
2004 Melbourne	Laurent Gané; Mickaël Bourgain; Arnaud Tournant; France	José Antonio Escuredo; Salvador Meliá; José Antonio Villanueva; Spain	Chris Hoy; Craig MacLean; Jamie Staff; Great Britain
2005 Los Angeles	Chris Hoy; Jamie Staff; Jason Queally; Great Britain	Theo Bos; Teun Mulder; Tim Veldt; Netherlands	Stefan Nimke; Matthias John; René Wolff; Germany
2006 Bordeaux	Grégory Baugé; Mickaël Bourgain; Arnaud Tournant; France	Chris Hoy; Jamie Staff; Jason Queally; Great Britain	Ryan Bayley; Shane Kelly; Shane Perkins; Australia
2007 Palma de Mallorca	Grégory Baugé; Mickaël Bourgain; Arnaud Tournant; France	Chris Hoy; Craig MacLean; Ross Edgar; Great Britain	Robert Förstemann; Maximilian Levy; Stefan Nimke; Germany
2008 Manchester	Grégory Baugé; Kévin Sireau; Arnaud Tournant; France	Chris Hoy; Jamie Staff; Ross Edgar; Great Britain	Theo Bos; Teun Mulder; Tim Veldt; Netherlands
2009 Pruszków	Grégory Baugé; Mickaël Bourgain; Kévin Sireau; France	Matthew Crampton; Jamie Staff; Jason Kenny; Great Britain	René Enders; Robert Förstemann; Stefan Nimke; Germany
2010 Ballerup	Robert Förstemann; Maximilian Levy; Stefan Nimke; Germany	Grégory Baugé; Michaël D'Almeida; Kévin Sireau; France	Ross Edgar; Chris Hoy; Jason Kenny; Great Britain
2011 Apeldoorn (Note: France's Grégory Baugé, Michaël D'Almeida and Kévin Sireau originally won the gold medal, but were stripped of that title in January 2012, with the other teams in the final round promoted to the respective medal positions.)	René Enders; Maximilian Levy; Stefan Nimke; Germany	Chris Hoy; Matthew Crampton; Jason Kenny; Great Britain	Dan Ellis; Matthew Glaetzer; Jason Niblett; Australia
2012 Melbourne	Shane Perkins; Scott Sunderland; Matthew Glaetzer; Australia	Grégory Baugé; Kévin Sireau; Michaël D'Almeida; France	Ethan Mitchell; Sam Webster; Edward Dawkins; New Zealand
2013 Minsk	René Enders; Stefan Bötticher; Maximilian Levy; Germany	Ethan Mitchell; Sam Webster; Edward Dawkins; New Zealand	François Pervis; Julien Palma; Michaël D'Almeida; France
2014 Cali	Ethan Mitchell; Sam Webster; Edward Dawkins; New Zealand	René Enders; Robert Förstemann; Maximilian Levy; Germany	Grégory Baugé; Kévin Sireau; Michaël D'Almeida; France
2015 Yvelines	Grégory Baugé; Michaël D'Almeida; Kévin Sireau; France	Eddie Dawkins; Ethan Mitchell; Sam Webster; New Zealand	René Enders; Joachim Eilers; Robert Förstemann; Germany
2016 London	Ethan Mitchell; Sam Webster; Eddie Dawkins; New Zealand	Nils van 't Hoenderdaal; Jeffrey Hoogland; Matthijs Büchli; Hugo Haak; Netherlands	René Enders; Max Niederlag; Joachim Eilers; Germany
2017 Hong Kong	Ethan Mitchell; Sam Webster; Eddie Dawkins; New Zealand	Jeffrey Hoogland; Harrie Lavreysen; Matthijs Büchli; Netherlands	Sébastien Vigier; Benjamin Edelin; Quentin Lafargue; France
2018 Apeldoorn	Nils van 't Hoenderdaal; Harrie Lavreysen; Matthijs Büchli; Netherlands	Jack Carlin; Philip Hindes; Jason Kenny; Ryan Owens; Joseph Truman; Great Britain	François Pervis; Sébastien Vigier; Michaël D'Almeida; Quentin Lafargue; France
2019 Pruszków	Roy van den Berg; Harrie Lavreysen; Jeffrey Hoogland Matthijs Büchli; Netherlands	Grégory Baugé; Sébastien Vigier; Michaël D'Almeida; Quentin Lafargue; France	Denis Dmitriev; Alexander Sharapov; Pavel Yakushevskiy; Russia
2020 Berlin	Roy van den Berg; Harrie Lavreysen; Jeffrey Hoogland; Matthijs Büchli; Netherlands	Ryan Owens; Jack Carlin; Jason Kenny; Great Britain	Thomas Cornish; Nathan Hart; Matthew Richardson; Australia
2021 Roubaix	Roy van den Berg; Harrie Lavreysen; Jeffrey Hoogland; Netherlands	Florian Grengbo; Sébastien Vigier; Rayan Helal; France	Nik Schröter; Stefan Bötticher; Joachim Eilers; Marc Jurczyk; Germany
2022 Saint-Quentin-en-Yvelines	Matthew Glaetzer; Leigh Hoffman; Matthew Richardson; Thomas Cornish; Australia	Roy van den Berg; Harrie Lavreysen; Jeffrey Hoogland; Netherlands	Alistair Fielding; Hamish Turnbull; Jack Carlin; Great Britain
2023 Glasgow	Roy van den Berg; Harrie Lavreysen; Jeffrey Hoogland; Netherlands	Leigh Hoffman; Matthew Richardson; Matthew Glaetzer; Thomas Cornish; Australia	Florian Grengbo; Sébastien Vigier; Rayan Helal; France
2024 Ballerup	Roy van den Berg; Harrie Lavreysen; Jeffrey Hoogland; Netherlands	Ryan Elliott; Leigh Hoffman; Thomas Cornish; Australia	Yoshitaku Nagasako; Kaiya Ota; Yuta Obara; Japan
2025 Santiago	Jeffrey Hoogland; Harrie Lavreysen; Roy van den Berg; Netherlands	Matthew Richardson; Joseph Truman; Hamish Turnbull; Harry Ledingham-Horn; Great Britain	Daniel Barber; Ryan Elliott; Leigh Hoffman; Australia
2026 Shanghai	Jeffrey Hoogland; Harrie Lavreysen; Roy van den Berg; Netherlands	Daniel Barber; Ryan Elliott; Leigh Hoffman; Australia	Jin Zhiheng; Li Zhiwei; Liu Qi; China

== Medal table ==
Rank	Nation	Gold	Silver	Bronze	Total
1	France	11	6	6	23
2	Netherlands	8	4	1	13
3	Germany	5	3	9	17
4	Australia	3	6	5	14
5	New Zealand	3	2	1	6
6	Great Britain	2	10	5	17
7	Spain	0	1	1	2
8	China	0	0	1	1
8	Japan	0	0	1	1
8	Russia	0	0	1	1
8	United States	0	0	1	1
Totals (11 entries)		32	32	32	96
