= 2018 UCI Track Cycling World Championships – Men's sprint =

Men's sprint at the 2018 UCI Track Cycling World Championships
- Venue: Omnisport Apeldoorn
- Location: Apeldoorn, Netherlands
- Dates: 2–3 March
- Competitors: 35 from 19 nations

Medalists
gold medal	Matthew Glaetzer	Australia
silver medal	Jack Carlin	Great Britain
bronze medal	Sebastien Vigier	France

The Men's sprint competition at the 2018 UCI Track Cycling World Championships was held on 2 and 3 March 2018.

== Results ==
=== Qualifying ===
The top four riders advanced directly to the 1/8 finals; places 5 to 28 advanced to the 1/16 final.

Rank	Name	Nation	Time	Behind	Notes
1	Jeffrey Hoogland	Netherlands	9.674		Q
2	Matthew Glaetzer	Australia	9.677	+0.003	Q
3	Sebastien Vigier	France	9.701	+0.027	Q
4	Harrie Lavreysen	Netherlands	9.709	+0.035	Q
5	Jack Carlin	Great Britain	9.715	+0.041	q
6	Mateusz Rudyk	Poland	9.742	+0.068	q
7	Denis Dmitriev	Russia	9.754	+0.080	q
8	Ryan Owens	Great Britain	9.759	+0.085	q
9	Melvin Landerneau	France	9.787	+0.113	q
10	Vasilijus Lendel	Lithuania	9.788	+0.114	q
11	Ethan Mitchell	New Zealand	9.805	+0.131	q
12	Stefan Ritter	Canada	9.828	+0.154	q
13	Eddie Dawkins	New Zealand	9.843	+0.169	q
14	Fabián Puerta	Colombia	9.852	+0.178	q
15	Rayan Helal	France	9.878	+0.204	q
16	Pavel Yakushevskiy	Russia	9.920	+0.246	q
17	Maximilian Levy	Germany	9.923	+0.249	q
18	Hugo Barrette	Canada	9.934	+0.260	q
19	Kazunari Watanabe	Japan	9.944	+0.270	q
20	Martin Čechman	Czech Republic	9.959	+0.285	q
21	Yuta Wakimoto	Japan	9.962	+0.288	q
22	Damian Zieliński	Poland	9.968	+0.294	q
23	Tomoyuki Kawabata	Japan	9.969	+0.295	q
24	Sam Webster	New Zealand	10.002	+0.328	q
25	Im Chae-bin	South Korea	10.030	+0.356	q
26	Eric Engler	Germany	10.056	+0.382	q
27	Nikita Shurshin	Russia	10.070	+0.396	q
28	Azizulhasni Awang	Malaysia	10.072	+0.398	q
29	Andriy Vynokurov	Ukraine	10.103	+0.429	
30	Juan Peralta	Spain	10.112	+0.438	
31	Jair Tjon En Fa	Suriname	10.137	+0.463	
32	David Sojka	Czech Republic	10.203	+0.529	
33	Svajūnas Jonauskas	Lithuania	10.243	+0.569	
34	Muhammad Sahrom	Malaysia	10.293	+0.619	
35	Sotirios Bretas	Greece	10.498	+0.824	

=== 1/16 finals ===
Heat winners advanced to the 1/8 finals.

Heat	Rank	Name	Nation	Gap	Notes
1	1	Jack Carlin	Great Britain		Q
1	2	Azizulhasni Awang	Malaysia	+0.052	
2	1	Mateusz Rudyk	Poland		Q
2	2	Nikita Shurshin	Russia	+0.039	
3	1	Denis Dmitriev	Russia		Q
3	2	Eric Engler	Germany	+0.290	
4	1	Ryan Owens	Great Britain		Q
4	2	Im Chae-bin	South Korea	+0.068	
5	1	Melvin Landerneau	France		Q
5	2	Sam Webster	New Zealand	+0.042	
6	1	Vasilijus Lendel	Lithuania		Q
6	2	Tomoyuki Kawabata	Japan	+0.131	
7	1	Ethan Mitchell	New Zealand		Q
7	2	Damian Zieliński	Poland	+0.057	
8	1	Yuta Wakimoto	Japan		Q
8	2	Stefan Ritter	Canada	+0.083	
9	1	Eddie Dawkins	New Zealand		Q
9	2	Martin Čechman	Czech Republic	+0.037	
10	1	Kazunari Watanabe	Japan		Q
10	2	Fabián Puerta	Colombia	REL	
11	1	Rayan Helal	France		Q
11	2	Hugo Barrette	Canada	+0.299	
12	1	Maximilian Levy	Germany		Q
12	2	Pavel Yakushevskiy	Russia	+0.055	

=== 1/8 finals ===
Heat winners advanced to the quarterfinals.

Heat	Rank	Name	Nation	Gap	Notes
1	1	Maximilian Levy	Germany		Q
1	2	Jeffrey Hoogland	Netherlands	+0.019	
2	1	Matthew Glaetzer	Australia		Q
2	2	Rayan Helal	France	+0.268	
3	1	Sebastien Vigier	France		Q
3	2	Kazunari Watanabe	Japan	+0.154	
4	1	Eddie Dawkins	New Zealand		Q
4	2	Harrie Lavreysen	Netherlands	+0.022	
5	1	Jack Carlin	Great Britain		Q
5	2	Yuta Wakimoto	Japan	+0.055	
6	1	Mateusz Rudyk	Poland		Q
6	2	Ethan Mitchell	New Zealand	+0.201	
7	1	Denis Dmitriev	Russia		Q
7	2	Vasilijus Lendel	Lithuania	+0.297	
8	1	Ryan Owens	Great Britain		Q
8	2	Melvin Landerneau	France	+0.031	

=== Quarterfinals ===
Matches were extended to a best-of-three format hereon; winners proceeded to the semifinals.

Heat	Rank	Name	Nation	Race 1	Race 2	Decider (i.r.)	Notes
1	1	Maximilian Levy	Germany	X	X		Q
1	2	Ryan Owens	Great Britain	+0.059	+0.133		
2	1	Matthew Glaetzer	Australia	X	X		Q
2	2	Denis Dmitriev	Russia	+0.192	+0.092		
3	1	Sebastien Vigier	France	X	X		Q
3	2	Mateusz Rudyk	Poland	+0.102	+0.038		
4	1	Jack Carlin	Great Britain	X	X		Q
4	2	Eddie Dawkins	New Zealand	+0.001	+0.561		

=== Semifinals ===
Matches were extended to a best-of-three format hereon; winners proceeded to the final.

Heat	Rank	Name	Nation	Race 1	Race 2	Decider (i.r.)	Notes
1	1	Jack Carlin	Great Britain	X	X		Q
1	2	Maximilian Levy	Germany	+0.053	+0.118		
2	1	Matthew Glaetzer	Australia	X	X		Q
2	2	Sebastien Vigier	France	+0.252	+0.144		

=== Finals ===
The final classification were determined in the medal finals.

Rank	Name	Nation	Race 1	Race 2	Decider (i.r.)
Gold medal race
1st place, gold medalist(s)	Matthew Glaetzer	Australia	X	X	
2nd place, silver medalist(s)	Jack Carlin	Great Britain	+0.045	+0.098	
Bronze medal race
3rd place, bronze medalist(s)	Sebastien Vigier	France	X	X	
4	Maximilian Levy	Germany	+0.023	+0.090	
