= Cycling at the 2018 Commonwealth Games – Men's keirin =

Cycling Track – Men's keirin at the 2018 Commonwealth Games
- Venue: Anna Meares Velodrome
- Dates: 6 April
- Competitors: 24 from 9 nations

Medalists
gold medal	Matthew Glaetzer	Australia
silver medal	Lewis Oliva	Wales
bronze medal	Eddie Dawkins	New Zealand

The Men's keirin at the 2018 Commonwealth Games was part of the cycling programme, which took place on 6 April 2018.

== Schedule ==
The schedule is as follows:

All times are Australian Eastern Standard Time (UTC+10)

Date	Time	Round
Friday 6 April 2018	19:02	First round
Friday 6 April 2018	19:45	First round repechages
Friday 6 April 2018	20:38	Second round
Friday 6 April 2018	21:11/21:16	Finals

== Results ==
=== First round ===
The top two in each heat advanced directly to the second round; the remainder were sent to the first round repechages.

==== Heat 1 ====
Rank	Rider	Gap	Notes
1	Patrick Constable (AUS)	–	Q
2	Azizulhasni Awang (MAS)	+0.115	Q
3	Kwesi Browne (TTO)	+0.128	
4	Sahil Kumar (IND)	+0.352	
5	Callum Skinner (SCO)	+0.598	
6	Hugo Barrette (CAN)	+3.869	

==== Heat 2 ====
Rank	Rider	Gap	Notes
1	Matthew Glaetzer (AUS)	–	Q
2	Stefan Ritter (CAN)	+0.074	Q
3	Philip Hindes (ENG)	+0.109	
4	Muhammad Sahrom (MAS)	+0.120	
5	Ranjit Singh (IND)	+0.256	
6	Bradly Knipe (NZL)	+1.512	

==== Heat 3 ====
Rank	Rider	Gap	Notes
1	Joseph Truman (ENG)	–	Q
2	Sam Webster (NZL)	+0.002	Q
3	Lewis Oliva (WAL)	+0.054	
4	Sanuraj Sanandaraj (IND)	+0.109	
5	Nicholas Paul (TTO)	+0.220	
6	Patrice St-Louis Pivin (CAN)	+0.311	

==== Heat 4 ====
Rank	Rider	Gap	Notes
1	Jack Carlin (SCO)	–	Q
2	Jacob Schmid (AUS)	+0.010	Q
3	Eddie Dawkins (NZL)	+0.051	
4	Ryan Owens (ENG)	+0.125	
5	Muhammad Alif Fahmy Khairul Anuar (MAS)	+0.410	
6	Njisane Phillip (TTO)	+1.548	

=== First round repechages ===
Only the repechage winners advanced to the second round.

==== Heat 1 ====
Rank	Rider	Gap	Notes
1	Ryan Owens (ENG)	–	Q
2	Kwesi Browne (TTO)	+0.052	
3	Sanuraj Sanandaraj (IND)	+0.101	
4	Bradly Knipe (NZL)	+1.195	

==== Heat 2 ====
Rank	Rider	Gap	Notes
1	Hugo Barrette (CAN)	–	Q
2	Nicholas Paul (TTO)	+0.013	
3	Philip Hindes (ENG)	+1.424	
4	Ranjit Singh (IND)	+1.979	

==== Heat 3 ====
Rank	Rider	Gap	Notes
1	Lewis Oliva (WAL)	–	Q
2	Njisane Phillip (TTO)	+0.082	
3	Muhammad Sahrom (MAS)	+0.281	
4	Callum Skinner (SCO)	+0.423	

==== Heat 4 ====
Rank	Rider	Gap	Notes
1	Eddie Dawkins (NZL)	–	Q
2	Muhammad Alif Fahmy Khairul Anuar (MAS)	+0.369	
3	Sahil Kumar (IND)	+0.707	
4	Patrice St-Louis Pivin (CAN)	+1.239	

=== Second round ===
The top three in each heat advanced to the final; the remainder were sent to the small final (for places 7–12).

==== Heat 1 ====
Rank	Rider	Gap	Notes
1	Sam Webster (NZL)	–	Q
2	Jack Carlin (SCO)	+0.091	Q
3	Eddie Dawkins (NZL)	+0.116	Q
4	Stefan Ritter (CAN)	+0.770	
5	Patrick Constable (AUS)	+0.829	
6	Ryan Owens (ENG)	+1.095	

==== Heat 2 ====
Rank	Rider	Gap	Notes
1	Matthew Glaetzer (AUS)	–	Q
2	Azizulhasni Awang (MAS)	+0.104	Q
3	Lewis Oliva (WAL)	+0.150	Q
4	Joseph Truman (ENG)	+0.213	
5	Hugo Barrette (CAN)	+0.399	
6	Jacob Schmid (AUS)	+0.690	

=== Finals ===
The final classification is determined in the medal finals.

==== Final (places 7–12) ====
Rank	Rider	Gap
7	Hugo Barrette (CAN)	–
8	Patrick Constable (AUS)	+0.111
9	Jacob Schmid (AUS)	+0.154
10	Joseph Truman (ENG)	+0.329
11	Stefan Ritter (CAN)	+0.418
12	Ryan Owens (ENG)	+0.555

==== Final (places 1–6) ====
Rank	Rider	Gap
1st place, gold medalist(s)	Matthew Glaetzer (AUS)	–
2nd place, silver medalist(s)	Lewis Oliva (WAL)	+0.035
3rd place, bronze medalist(s)	Eddie Dawkins (NZL)	+0.168
4	Jack Carlin (SCO)	+0.201
5	Sam Webster (NZL)	+0.256
6	Azizulhasni Awang (MAS)	+0.386
