= Cycling at the 2018 Commonwealth Games – Men's sprint =

Cycling Track – Men's sprint at the 2018 Commonwealth Games
- Venue: Anna Meares Velodrome
- Dates: 7 April
- Competitors: 23 from 9 nations

Medalists
gold medal	Sam Webster	New Zealand
silver medal	Jack Carlin	Scotland
bronze medal	Jacob Schmid	Australia

The men's sprint at the 2018 Commonwealth Games was part of the cycling programme, taking place on 7 April 2018.

== Records ==
Prior to this competition, the existing world and Games records were as follows:

World record	Francois Pervis (FRA)	9.347	Aguascalientes, Mexico	6 December 2013
Games record	Matthew Glaetzer (AUS)	9.779	Glasgow, Scotland	24 July 2014

== Schedule ==
The schedule is as follows:

All times are Australian Eastern Standard Time (UTC+10)

Date	Time	Round
Saturday 7 April 2018	13:32	Qualifying
Saturday 7 April 2018	14:23	1/8 Finals
Saturday 7 April 2018	15:05	Quarterfinals
Saturday 7 April 2018	18:40	Semifinals
Saturday 7 April 2018	20:47	Finals

== Results ==
=== Qualifying ===
16 riders will be qualified and seeded for the 1/8 finals according to their times in qualification.

Rank	Riders	Time	Behind	Average speed (km/h)	Notes
1	Matthew Glaetzer (AUS)	9.583	—	75.133	Q, GR
2	Jack Carlin (SCO)	9.650	+0.067	74.611	Q
3	Ethan Mitchell (NZL)	9.654	+0.071	74.580	Q
4	Ryan Owens (ENG)	9.662	+0.079	74.519	Q
5	Philip Hindes (ENG)	9.669	+0.086	74.465	Q
6	Jacob Schmid (AUS)	9.690	+0.107	74.303	Q
7	Eddie Dawkins (NZL)	9.704	+0.121	74.196	Q
8	Lewis Oliva (WAL)	9.737	+0.154	73.945	Q
9	Hugo Barrette (CAN)	9.769	+0.186	73.703	Q
10	Joseph Truman (ENG)	9.780	+0.197	73.620	Q
11	Stefan Ritter (CAN)	9.803	+0.220	73.447	Q
12	Sam Webster (NZL)	9.809	+0.226	73.402	Q
13	Nicholas Paul (TTO)	9.836	+0.253	73.200	Q
14	Patrick Constable (AUS)	9.890	+0.307	72.801	Q
15	Njisane Phillip (TTO)	9.986	+0.403	72.101	Q
16	Muhammad Sahrom (MAS)	10.013	+0.430	71.907	Q
17	Fadhil Mohd Zonis (MAS)	10.183	+0.600	70.706	
18	Keron Bramble (TTO)	10.214	+0.631	70.491	
19	Patrice St-Louis Pivin (CAN)	10.246	+0.663	70.271	
20	Sanuraj Sanandaraj (IND)	10.381	+0.798	69.357	
21	Ranjit Singh (IND)	10.486	+0.903	68.663	
22	Sahil Kumar (IND)	10.584	+1.001	68.027	
23	Shariz Efendi Shahrin (MAS)	10.692	+1.109	67.340	
	Callum Skinner (SCO)	DNS			

=== 1/8 Finals ===
Heat winners advance to the quarterfinals.

Heat	Rank	Riders	Time (Gap)	Notes
1	1	Muhammad Sahrom (MAS)	—	Q
1	2	Matthew Glaetzer (AUS)	+0.024	
2	1	Jack Carlin (SCO)	—	Q
2	2	Njisane Phillip (TTO)	+2.043	
3	1	Ethan Mitchell (NZL)	—	Q
3	2	Patrick Constable (AUS)	+0.138	
4	1	Ryan Owens (ENG)	—	Q
4	2	Nicholas Paul (TTO)	REL^{[R1]}	
5	1	Sam Webster (NZL)	—	Q
5	2	Philip Hindes (ENG)	+0.042	
6	1	Jacob Schmid (AUS)	—	Q
6	2	Stefan Ritter (CAN)	+0.040	
7	1	Joseph Truman (ENG)	—	Q
7	2	Eddie Dawkins (NZL)	+0.202	
8	1	Lewis Oliva (WAL)	—	Q
8	2	Hugo Barrette (CAN)	+2.783	

- ^{^{R1}} Relegation for entering the sprinter's lane when the opponent was already there

=== Quarterfinals ===
Matches are extended to a best-of-three format hereon; winners proceed to the semifinals.

Heat	Rank	Riders	Race 1	Race 2	Decider (i.r.)	Notes
1	1	Muhammad Sahrom (MAS)	X	X		Q
1	2	Lewis Oliva (WAL)	+0.304	+0.169		
2	1	Jack Carlin (SCO)	+0.002	X	X	Q
2	2	Joseph Truman (ENG)	X	+0.086	+0.063	
3	1	Jacob Schmid (AUS)	X	X		Q
3	2	Ethan Mitchell (NZL)	+0.030	+0.002		
4	1	Sam Webster (NZL)	X	X		Q
4	2	Ryan Owens (ENG)	+0.074	+0.020		

=== Semifinals ===
Winners proceed to the gold medal final; losers proceed to the bronze medal final.

Heat	Rank	Riders	Race 1	Race 2	Decider (i.r.)	Notes
1	1	Sam Webster (NZL)	X	X		QG
1	2	Muhammad Sahrom (MAS)	+0.276	+0.572		QB
2	1	Jack Carlin (SCO)	X	X		QG
2	2	Jacob Schmid (AUS)	+0.015	+0.016		QB

=== Finals ===
The final classification is determined in the medal finals.

Rank	Riders	Race 1	Race 2	Decider (i.r.)
Bronze medal final
3rd place, bronze medalist(s)	Jacob Schmid (AUS)	X	X	
4	Muhammad Sahrom (MAS)	+0.235	+0.032	
Gold medal final
1st place, gold medalist(s)	Sam Webster (NZL)	X	X	
2nd place, silver medalist(s)	Jack Carlin (SCO)	+0.429	+0.005	
