= 2018 UCI Track Cycling World Championships – Men's keirin =

Men's keirin at the 2018 UCI Track Cycling World Championships
- Venue: Omnisport Apeldoorn
- Location: Apeldoorn, Netherlands
- Dates: 1 March
- Competitors: 29 from 17 nations

Medalists
gold medal	Fabián Puerta	Colombia
silver medal	Tomoyuki Kawabata	Japan
bronze medal	Maximilian Levy	Germany

The men's keirin competition at the 2018 UCI Track Cycling World Championships was held on 1 March 2018 at the Omnisport Apeldoorn in Apeldoorn, Netherlands.

== Results ==
=== First round ===
The first rider in each heat qualified to the second round, all other riders advanced to the first round repechages.

Heat 1

Rank	Name	Nation	Gap	Notes
1	Maximilian Levy	Germany		Q
2	Andriy Vynokurov	Ukraine	+0.078	
3	Vasilijus Lendel	Lithuania	+0.253	
4	Yuta Wakimoto	Japan	+0.319	
5	Sam Webster	New Zealand	+3.340	

Heat 2

Rank	Name	Nation	Gap	Notes
1	Joachim Eilers	Germany		Q
2	Joseph Truman	Great Britain		
3	Yudai Nitta	Japan	+0.448	
4	Eddie Dawkins	New Zealand	+0.515	
5	Jean Spies	South Africa	+0.569	

Heat 3

Rank	Name	Nation	Gap	Notes
1	Jack Carlin	Great Britain		Q
2	Pavel Kelemen	Czech Republic	+0.027	
3	Maximilian Dornbach	Germany	+0.140	
4	Juan Peralta	Spain	+0.328	
5	Kang Shih-feng	Chinese Taipei	+0.666	

- Q = qualified to Second round

Heat 4

Rank	Name	Nation	Gap	Notes
1	Matthew Glaetzer	Australia		Q
2	Tomoyuki Kawabata	Japan	+0.160	
3	Santiago Ramírez	Colombia	+0.406	
4	Patryk Rajkowski	Poland	+0.426	
5	François Pervis	France	+2.127	

Heat 5

Rank	Name	Nation	Gap	Notes
1	Matthijs Büchli	Netherlands		Q
2	Muhammad Sahrom	Malaysia	+0.125	
3	Hugo Barrette	Canada	+0.664	
4	David Sojka	Czech Republic	+0.792	
5	Quentin Lafargue	France	+0.894	

Heat 6

Rank	Name	Nation	Gap	Notes
1	Fabián Puerta	Colombia		Q
2	Jordan Castle	New Zealand	+0.081	
3	Azizulhasni Awang	Malaysia	+0.526	
4	Harrie Lavreysen	Netherlands	+1.470	

=== First round repechage ===
The winner of each heat qualified to the second round.

Heat 1

Rank	Name	Nation	Gap	Notes
1	Andriy Vynokurov	Ukraine		Q
2	Azizulhasni Awang	Malaysia	+0.035	
3	François Pervis	France	+0.103	
4	David Sojka	Czech Republic	+0.913	

Heat 2

Rank	Name	Nation	Gap	Notes
1	Hugo Barrette	Canada		Q
2	Patryk Rajkowski	Poland	+0.100	
3	Joseph Truman	Great Britain	+0.132	
4	Kang Shih-feng	Chinese Taipei	+4.219	

Heat 3

Rank	Name	Nation	Gap	Notes
1	Juan Peralta	Spain		Q
2	Pavel Kelemen	Czech Republic	+0.034	
3	Sam Webster	New Zealand	+18.502	
4	Santiago Ramírez	Colombia	+0.111	

- Q = qualified to Second round

Heat 4

Rank	Name	Nation	Gap	Notes
1	Tomoyuki Kawabata	Japan		Q
2	Eddie Dawkins	New Zealand		
3	Maximilian Dornbach	Germany	+0.169	
4	Jean Spies	South Africa	+1.987	

Heat 5

Rank	Name	Nation	Gap	Notes
1	Yuta Wakimoto	Japan		Q
2	Vasilijus Lendel	Lithuania	+0.124	
3	Muhammad Sahrom	Malaysia		
4	Quentin Lafargue	France	+0.441	

Heat 6

Rank	Name	Nation	Gap	Notes
1	Harrie Lavreysen	Netherlands		Q
2	Jordan Castle	New Zealand	+0.344	
3	Yudai Nitta	Japan	+0.459	

=== Second round ===
The first three riders in each heat qualify to final 1–6, all other riders advance to final 7–12.

Heat 1

Rank	Name	Nation	Gap	Notes
1	Harrie Lavreysen	Netherlands		Q
2	Maximilian Levy	Germany	+0.068	Q
3	Fabián Puerta	Colombia	+0.094	Q
4	Matthew Glaetzer	Australia	+0.144	
5	Yuta Wakimoto	Japan	+0.245	
6	Juan Peralta	Spain	+0.400	

Heat 2

Rank	Name	Nation	Gap	Notes
1	Matthijs Büchli	Netherlands		Q
2	Jack Carlin	Great Britain	+0.197	Q
3	Tomoyuki Kawabata	Japan	+0.214	Q
4	Hugo Barrette	Canada	+0.249	
5	Andriy Vynokurov	Ukraine	+0.671	
6	Joachim Eilers	Germany	+1.367	

=== Finals ===
The finals were started at 20:39.

==== Small final ====
Rank	Name	Nation	Gap	Notes
7	Matthew Glaetzer	Australia		
8	Andriy Vynokurov	Ukraine	+0.101	
9	Yuta Wakimoto	Japan	+0.143	
10	Hugo Barrette	Canada	+0.144	
11	Juan Peralta	Spain	+0.233	
12	Joachim Eilers	Germany	+1.219	

==== Final ====
Rank	Name	Nation	Gap	Notes
1st place, gold medalist(s)	Fabián Puerta	Colombia		
2nd place, silver medalist(s)	Tomoyuki Kawabata	Japan	+0.043	
3rd place, bronze medalist(s)	Maximilian Levy	Germany	+0.101	
4	Matthijs Büchli	Netherlands	+0.161	
5	Jack Carlin	Great Britain	+0.200	
6	Harrie Lavreysen	Netherlands	+0.827	
