= 2017 UCI Track Cycling World Championships – Men's sprint =

Men's sprint at the 2017 UCI Track Cycling World Championships
- Venue: Hong Kong Velodrome, Hong Kong
- Date: 14–15 April
- Competitors: 33 from 20 nations

Medalists
gold medal	Denis Dmitriev	Russia
silver medal	Harrie Lavreysen	Netherlands
bronze medal	Ethan Mitchell	New Zealand

The Men's sprint event of the 2017 UCI Track Cycling World Championships was held on 14 and 15 April 2017.

== Results ==
=== Qualifying ===
The top four riders advanced directly to the 1/8 finals; places 5 to 28 advanced to the 1/16 final.

Rank	Name	Nation	Time	Behind	Notes
1	Denis Dmitriev	Russia	9.645		Q
2	Max Niederlag	Germany	9.665	+0.020	Q
3	Sebastien Vigier	France	9.753	+0.108	Q
4	Ethan Mitchell	New Zealand	9.767	+0.122	Q
5	Matthew Glaetzer	Australia	9.815	+0.170	q
6	Harrie Lavreysen	Netherlands	9.832	+0.187	q
7	Ryan Owens	Great Britain	9.865	+0.220	q
8	Andriy Vynokurov	Ukraine	9.870	+0.225	q
9	Sam Webster	New Zealand	9.879	+0.234	q
10	Hugo Barrette	Canada	9.892	+0.247	q
11	Kamil Kuczyński	Poland	9.895	+0.250	q
12	Pavel Yakushevskiy	Russia	9.911	+0.266	q
13	François Pervis	France	9.948	+0.303	q
14	Vasilijus Lendel	Lithuania	9.958	+0.313	q
15	Callum Skinner	Great Britain	9.969	+0.324	q
16	Patrick Constable	Australia	9.975	+0.330	q
17	Fabián Puerta	Colombia	9.982	+0.337	q
18	Xu Chao	China	9.991	+0.346	q
19	Eddie Dawkins	New Zealand	9.996	+0.351	q
20	Pavel Kelemen	Czech Republic	10.003	+0.358	q
21	Rafał Sarnecki	Poland	10.005	+0.360	q
22	Jair Tjon En Fa	Suriname	10.038	+0.393	q
23	Azizulhasni Awang	Malaysia	10.057	+0.412	q
24	Theo Bos	Netherlands	10.061	+0.416	q
25	Juan Peralta	Spain	10.083	+0.438	q
26	Eric Engler	Germany	10.083	+0.438	q
27	Sandor Szalontay	Hungary	10.084	+0.439	q
28	Santiago Ramírez	Colombia	10.105	+0.460	q
29	Kirill Samusenko	Russia	10.144	+0.499	
30	David Sojka	Czech Republic	10.156	+0.511	
31	Tomoyuki Kawabata	Japan	10.158	+0.513	
32	Diego Peña	Colombia	10.427	+0.782	
33	Kwesi Browne	Trinidad and Tobago	10.452	+0.807	

- Q = qualified directly for 1/8 finals
- q = qualified for 1/16 finals

=== 1/16 finals ===
Heat winners advanced to the 1/8 finals.

Heat	Rank	Name	Nation	Gap	Notes
1	1	Matthew Glaetzer	Australia		Q
1	2	Santiago Ramírez	Colombia	+0.143	
2	1	Harrie Lavreysen	Netherlands		Q
2	2	Sandor Szalontay	Hungary	+0.719	
3	1	Ryan Owens	Great Britain		Q
3	2	Eric Engler	Germany	+0.178	
4	1	Andriy Vynokurov	Ukraine		Q
4	2	Juan Peralta	Spain	+0.038	
5	1	Sam Webster	New Zealand		Q
5	2	Theo Bos	Netherlands	+0.120	
6	1	Hugo Barrette	Canada		Q
6	2	Azizulhasni Awang	Malaysia	+0.180	
7	1	Jair Tjon En Fa	Suriname		Q
7	2	Kamil Kuczyński	Poland	+0.264	
8	1	Pavel Yakushevskiy	Russia		Q
8	2	Rafał Sarnecki	Poland	+0.032	
9	1	François Pervis	France		Q
9	2	Pavel Kelemen	Czech Republic	+0.135	
10	1	Eddie Dawkins	New Zealand		Q
10	2	Vasilijus Lendel	Lithuania	+0.237	
11	1	Callum Skinner	Great Britain		Q
11	2	Xu Chao	China	+0.038	
12	1	Patrick Constable	Australia		Q
12	2	Fabián Puerta	Colombia	+0.205	

=== 1/8 finals ===
Heat winners advanced to the quarterfinals.

Heat	Rank	Name	Nation	Gap	Notes
1	1	Denis Dmitriev	Russia		Q
1	2	Patrick Constable	Australia	+0.632	
2	1	Max Niederlag	Germany		Q
2	2	Callum Skinner	Great Britain	+0.070	
3	1	Eddie Dawkins	New Zealand		Q
3	2	Sebastien Vigier	France	+0.011	
4	1	Ethan Mitchell	New Zealand		Q
4	2	François Pervis	France	+1.890	
5	1	Matthew Glaetzer	Australia		Q
5	2	Pavel Yakushevskiy	Russia	+0.128	
6	1	Harrie Lavreysen	Netherlands		Q
6	2	Jair Tjon En Fa	Suriname	+0.109	
7	1	Ryan Owens	Great Britain		Q
7	2	Hugo Barrette	Canada	+0.062	
8	1	Sam Webster	New Zealand		Q
8	2	Andriy Vynokurov	Ukraine	+0.074	

=== Quarterfinals ===
Matches were extended to a best-of-three format hereon; winners proceeded to the semifinals.

Heat	Rank	Name	Nation	Race 1	Race 2	Decider (i.r.)	Notes
1	1	Denis Dmitriev	Russia	X	X		Q
1	2	Sam Webster	New Zealand	+0.776	+0.061		
2	1	Ryan Owens	Great Britain	X	+0.014	X	Q
2	2	Max Niederlag	Germany	+0.096	X	REL^{[A]}	
3	1	Harrie Lavreysen	Netherlands	X	X		Q
3	2	Eddie Dawkins	New Zealand	+0.677	+0.004		
4	1	Ethan Mitchell	New Zealand	+0.049	X	X	Q
4	2	Matthew Glaetzer	Australia	X	+0.062	REL^{[A]}	

- ^{^{A}} Max Niederlag and Matthew Glaetzer were relegated "for irregular movement to prevent his opponent from passing"

=== Semifinals ===
Winners proceeded to the gold medal final; losers proceeded to the bronze medal final.

Heat	Rank	Name	Nation	Race 1	Race 2	Decider (i.r.)	Notes
1	1	Denis Dmitriev	Russia	X	X		Q
1	2	Ethan Mitchell	New Zealand	+0.197	+0.154		
2	1	Harrie Lavreysen	Netherlands	X	X		Q
2	2	Ryan Owens	Great Britain	+0.066	+0.080		

=== Finals ===
The final classification was determined in the medal finals.

Rank	Name	Nation	Race 1	Race 2	Decider (i.r.)
Gold medal final
1st place, gold medalist(s)	Denis Dmitriev	Russia	X	X	
2nd place, silver medalist(s)	Harrie Lavreysen	Netherlands	+0.201	+0.179	
Bronze medal final
3rd place, bronze medalist(s)	Ethan Mitchell	New Zealand	X	X	
4	Ryan Owens	Great Britain	+0.526	+0.255	
