= 2020 UCI Track Cycling World Championships – Men's team sprint =

Men's team sprint at the 2020 UCI Track Cycling World Championships
- Venue: Velodrom
- Location: Berlin, Germany
- Dates: 26 February
- Competitors: 45 from 14 nations
- Teams: 14

Medalists
gold medal	Roy van den Berg; Harrie Lavreysen; Jeffrey Hoogland; Matthijs Büchli	Netherlands
silver medal	Ryan Owens; Jack Carlin; Jason Kenny	Great Britain
bronze medal	Thomas Cornish; Nathan Hart; Matthew Richardson	Australia

The Men's team sprint competition at the 2020 UCI Track Cycling World Championships was held on 26 February 2020.

== Results ==
=== Qualifying ===
The qualifying was started at 19:12. The best eight teams advance to the first round.

Rank	Nation	Time	Behind	Notes
1	Netherlands; Roy van den Berg; Harrie Lavreysen; Matthijs Büchli	41.987		Q
2	Great Britain; Ryan Owens; Jack Carlin; Jason Kenny	42.471	+0.484	Q
3	France; Grégory Baugé; Sébastien Vigier; Quentin Lafargue	42.805	+0.818	Q
4	Australia; Thomas Cornish; Nathan Hart; Matthew Richardson	42.996	+1.009	Q
5	Poland; Maciej Bielecki; Krzysztof Maksel; Mateusz Rudyk	43.041	+1.054	Q
6	New Zealand; Ethan Mitchell; Sam Webster; Eddie Dawkins	43.083	+1.096	Q
7	Germany; Eric Engler; Stefan Bötticher; Maximilian Levy	43.140	+1.153	Q
8	Russia; Alexander Sharapov; Denis Dmitriev; Pavel Yakushevskiy	43.236	+1.249	Q
9	Japan; Kazuki Amagai; Yudai Nitta; Tomohiro Fukaya	43.416	+1.429	
10	China; Guo Shuai; Luo Yongjia; Zhang Miao	43.830	+1.843	
11	Belarus; Aliaksandr Hlova; Artsiom Zaitsau; Uladzislau Novik	44.352	+2.366	
12	Spain; Alejandro Martínez; Juan Peralta; José Moreno Sánchez	44.630	+2.643	
13	Kazakhstan; Maxim Nalyotov; Sergey Ponomaryov; Andrey Chugay	45.043	+3.056	
14	India; Jemsh Singh Keithellakpam; Rojit Singh Yanglem; Esow Alben	46.063	+4.076	

=== First round ===
The first round was started at 20:27.

First round heats were held as follows:
Heat 1: 4th v 5th fastest
Heat 2: 3rd v 6th fastest
Heat 3: 2nd v 7th fastest
Heat 4: 1st v 8th fastest

The heat winners were ranked on time, from which the top 2 advanced to the gold medal final and the other 2 proceeded to the bronze medal final.

Rank	Overall rank	Nation	Time	Behind	Notes
4 vs 5
1	5	Australia; Thomas Cornish; Nathan Hart; Matthew Richardson	43.044		QB
2	8	Poland; Maciej Bielecki; Mateusz Rudyk; Rafał Sarnecki	43.490	+0.446	
3 vs 6
1	3	France; Grégory Baugé; Melvin Landerneau; Sébastien Vigier	42.730		QB
2	7	New Zealand; Eddie Dawkins; Ethan Mitchell; Sam Webster	43.205	+0.475	
2 vs 7
1	2	Great Britain; Jack Carlin; Jason Kenny; Ryan Owens	42.294		QG
2	6	Germany; Stefan Bötticher; Eric Engler; Maximilian Levy	43.144	+0.850	
1 vs 8
1	1	Netherlands; Jeffrey Hoogland; Harrie Lavreysen; Roy van den Berg	41.275		QG, WR
2	4	Russia; Denis Dmitriev; Alexander Sharapov; Pavel Yakushevskiy	42.868	+1.593	

- QG = qualified for gold medal final
- QB = qualified for bronze medal final

=== Finals ===
The finals were started at 21:22.

Rank	Nation	Time	Behind	Notes
Gold medal race
1st place, gold medalist(s)	Netherlands; Roy van den Berg; Harrie Lavreysen; Jeffrey Hoogland	41.225		WR
2nd place, silver medalist(s)	Great Britain; Ryan Owens; Jack Carlin; Jason Kenny	42.400	+1.175	
Bronze medal race
3rd place, bronze medalist(s)	Australia; Thomas Cornish; Nathan Hart; Matthew Richardson	42.829		
4	France; Grégory Baugé; Sébastien Vigier; Quentin Lafargue	43.213	+0.384	
