= Cycling at the 2020 Summer Olympics – Men's team sprint =

Olympic cycling event

Men's team sprint at the Games of the XXXII Olympiad
- Olympic track cycling
- Venues: Izu Velodrome
- Dates: 3 August 2021
- Competitors: 26 from 8 nations
- Teams: 8

Medalists
1st place, gold medalist(s)		Roy van den Berg; Harrie Lavreysen; Jeffrey Hoogland; Matthijs Büchli	Netherlands
2nd place, silver medalist(s)		Jack Carlin; Jason Kenny; Ryan Owens	Great Britain
3rd place, bronze medalist(s)		Florian Grengbo; Rayan Helal; Sébastien Vigier	France

The men's team sprint event at the 2020 Summer Olympics took place on 3 August 2021 at the Izu Velodrome. 24 cyclists (8 teams of 3) from 8 nations competed.

== Background ==
This will be the 6th appearance of the event, which has been held at every Summer Olympics since 2000.

The reigning Olympic champions are Philip Hindes, Jason Kenny, and Callum Skinner of Great Britain; it was the third consecutive victory for Great Britain in the event (all three times with Kenny on the team). The reigning (2020) World Champions are Roy van den Berg, Harrie Lavreysen, and Jeffrey Hoogland of the Netherlands. Great Britain had the second place team, including Kenny, at the World Championships.

== Qualification ==
A National Olympic Committee (NOC) could enter up to 1 team of 3 cyclists in the men's team sprint. Quota places are allocated to the NOC, which selects the cyclists. Qualification is entirely through the 2018–20 UCI nation rankings. The eight top NOCs on the ranking list qualified for the team sprint event. These nations also received the right to enter two cyclists each in the individual sprint and Keirin. Because qualification was complete by the end of the 2020 UCI Track Cycling World Championships on 1 March 2020 (the last event that contributed to the 2018–20 rankings), qualification was unaffected by the COVID-19 pandemic.

== Competition format ==
A men's team sprint race consists of a three-lap (750 m) race between two teams of three cyclists, starting on opposite sides of the track. Each member of the team must lead for one of the laps. The time for a team is measured to when the last cyclist finishes. Ties are broken by splits on the last lap.

The tournament consists of an initial qualifying round that seeds the teams. The first round comprises head-to-head races based on seeding (1st vs. 8th, 2nd vs. 7th, etc.). The winners of those four heats advance to the medal round, with the two fastest winners competing in the gold medal final and the two slower winners facing off for bronze.

== Schedule ==
All times are Japan Standard Time (UTC+9)

Date	Time	Round
3 August	15:58	Qualifying
3 August	16:50	First round
3 August	17:35	Finals

== Results ==
=== Qualifying ===
Rank	Country	Cyclists	Result	Notes
1	Netherlands	Roy van den Berg; Harrie Lavreysen; Matthijs Büchli	42.134	OR
2	Great Britain	Ryan Owens; Jack Carlin; Jason Kenny	42.231	
3	Australia	Matthew Richardson; Nathan Hart; Matthew Glaetzer	42.371	
4	France	Florian Grengbo; Sébastien Vigier; Rayan Helal	42.722	
5	New Zealand	Sam Dakin; Ethan Mitchell; Sam Webster	43.066	
6	ROC	Ivan Gladyshev; Denis Dmitriev; Pavel Yakushevskiy	43.097	
7	Germany	Timo Bichler; Stefan Bötticher; Maximilian Levy	43.140	
8	Poland	Mateusz Rudyk; Patryk Rajkowski; Krzysztof Maksel	43.516	

=== First round ===
Rank	Heat	Country	Cyclists	Result	Notes
1	4	Netherlands	Jeffrey Hoogland; Harrie Lavreysen; Roy van den Berg	41.431	QG, OR
2	3	Great Britain	Jack Carlin; Jason Kenny; Ryan Owens	41.829	QG
3	2	Australia	Matthew Glaetzer; Nathan Hart; Matthew Richardson	42.103	QB
4	1	France	Florian Grengbo; Rayan Helal; Sébastien Vigier	42.294	QB
5	3	Germany	Timo Bichler; Stefan Bötticher; Maximilian Levy	42.733	
6	2	ROC	Denis Dmitriev; Ivan Gladyshev; Pavel Yakushevskiy	42.915	
7	1	New Zealand	Sam Dakin; Ethan Mitchell; Sam Webster	42.978	
8	4	Poland	Krzysztof Maksel; Patryk Rajkowski; Mateusz Rudyk	43.307	

=== Finals ===
Rank	Country	Cyclists	Result	Notes
Gold medal final
1st place, gold medalist(s)	Netherlands	Jeffrey Hoogland; Harrie Lavreysen; Roy van den Berg	41.369	OR
2nd place, silver medalist(s)	Great Britain	Jack Carlin; Jason Kenny; Ryan Owens	44.589	
Bronze medal final
3rd place, bronze medalist(s)	France	Florian Grengbo; Rayan Helal; Sébastien Vigier	42.331	
4	Australia	Matthew Glaetzer; Nathan Hart; Matthew Richardson	44.013	
Fifth place final
5	Germany	Timo Bichler; Stefan Bötticher; Maximilian Levy		
6	ROC	Denis Dmitriev; Ivan Gladyshev; Pavel Yakushevskiy	REL	
Seventh place final
7	New Zealand	Ethan Mitchell; Callum Saunders; Sam Webster	43.703	
8	Poland	Krzysztof Maksel; Patryk Rajkowski; Mateusz Rudyk	46.431	
