= Cycling at the 2022 Commonwealth Games – Men's team sprint =

Cycling Track – Men's team sprint at the 2022 Commonwealth Games
- Venue: Lee Valley VeloPark
- Dates: 29 July
- Competitors: 21 from 7 nations
- Winning time: 42.040

Medalists
gold medal	Matthew Glaetzer; Leigh Hoffman; Matthew Richardson	Australia
silver medal	Ryan Owens; Joseph Truman; Hamish Turnbull	England
bronze medal	Sam Dakin; Bradly Knipe; Sam Webster	New Zealand

The men's team sprint at the 2022 Commonwealth Games was part of the cycling programme, and took place on 29 July 2022.

== Records ==
Prior to this competition, the existing world and Games records were as follows:

World record	Netherlands (Jeffrey Hoogland, Harrie Lavreysen, Roy van den Berg)	41.225	Berlin, Germany	26 February 2020
Games record	New Zealand (Ethan Mitchell, Eddie Dawkins, Sam Webster)	42.822	Brisbane, Australia	5 April 2018

== Schedule ==
The schedule is as follows:

All times are British Summer Time (UTC+1)

Date	Time	Round
Friday 29 July 2022	12:16	Qualifying
Friday 29 July 2022	18:03	Finals

== Results ==
=== Qualifying ===
The two fastest teams advanced to the gold medal final. The next two fastest teams advanced to the bronze medal final.

Rank	Nation	Time	Behind	Notes
1	Australia; Leigh Hoffman; Matthew Richardson; Matthew Glaetzer	42.222	–	QG, GR
2	England; Ryan Owens; Hamish Turnbull; Joseph Truman	43.296	+1.074	QG
3	New Zealand; Bradly Knipe; Sam Dakin; Sam Webster	43.974	+1.752	QB
4	Canada; Tyler Rorke; Nick Wammes; Ryan Dodyk	44.071	+1.849	QB
5	Malaysia; Muhammad Ridwan Sahrom; Muhammad Shah Firdaus Sahrom; Muhammad Fadhil Mohd Zonis	44.496	+2.274	
6	India; Yanglem Rojit Singh; David Beckham; Ronaldo Laitonjam	44.702	+2.480	
7	Jamaica; Zoe Boyd; Daniel Palmer; Malik Reid	49.845	+7.623	

=== Finals ===
Rank	Nation	Time	Behind	Notes
Gold medal final
1st place, gold medalist(s)	Australia; Matthew Glaetzer; Leigh Hoffman; Matthew Richardson	42.040		GR
2nd place, silver medalist(s)	England; Ryan Owens; Joseph Truman; Hamish Turnbull	43.372	+1.332	
Bronze medal final
3rd place, bronze medalist(s)	New Zealand; Sam Dakin; Bradly Knipe; Sam Webster	43.856		
4	Canada; Ryan Dodyk; Tyler Rorke; Nick Wammes	44.573	+0.717	
