= 2019 UEC European Track Championships – Men's team sprint =

Men's team sprint at the 2019 UEC European Track Championships
- Venue: Omnisport Apeldoorn, Apeldoorn
- Date: 16 October
- Competitors: 35 from 10 nations
- Winning time: 42.151

Medalists
gold medal	Jeffrey Hoogland; Harrie Lavreysen; Roy van den Berg; Matthijs Büchli	Netherlands
silver medal	Jack Carlin; Jason Kenny; Ryan Owens	Great Britain
bronze medal	Grégory Baugé; Quentin Lafargue; Sébastien Vigier; Melvin Landerneau	France

The men's team sprint competition at the 2019 UEC European Track Championships was held on 16 October 2019.

== Results ==
=== Qualifying ===
The eight fastest teams advanced to the first round.

Rank	Name	Nation	Time	Behind	Notes
1	Matthijs Büchli; Harrie Lavreysen; Roy van den Berg	Netherlands	42.693		Q
2	Jack Carlin; Jason Kenny; Ryan Owens	Great Britain	42.938	+0.245	Q
3	Grégory Baugé; Melvin Landerneau; Sébastien Vigier	France	43.338	+0.645	Q
4	Maciej Bielecki; Krzysztof Maksel; Mateusz Rudyk	Poland	43.970	+1.277	Q
5	Maximilian Dörnbach; Eric Engler; Maximilian Levy	Germany	43.981	+1.288	Q
6	Denis Dmitriev; Alexander Sharapov; Pavel Yakushevskiy	Russia	44.017	+1.324	Q
7	Tomáš Bábek; Martin Čechman; Pavel Kelemen	Czech Republic	44.324	+1.631	Q
8	Alejandro Martínez; José Moreno Sánchez; Juan Peralta	Spain	44.600	+1.907	Q
9	Aliaksandr Hlova; Uladzislau Novik; Artsiom Zaitsau	Belarus	44.838	+2.145	
10	Tadey-Ivan Chebanets; Oleksandr Moshchonskyi; Dmytro Stovbetskyi	Ukraine	46.148	+3.455	

=== First round ===
First round heats were held as follows:
Heat 1: 4th v 5th fastest
Heat 2: 3rd v 6th fastest
Heat 3: 2nd v 7th fastest
Heat 4: 1st v 8th fastest

The heat winners were ranked on time, from which the top 2 proceeded to the gold medal final and the other 2 proceeded to the bronze medal final.

Rank	Overall rank	Name	Nation	Time	Behind	Notes
1 vs 8
1	1	Jeffrey Hoogland; Harrie Lavreysen; Roy van den Berg	Netherlands	42.338		QG
2	8	Alejandro Martínez; José Moreno Sánchez; Juan Peralta	Spain	44.868	+2.530	
2 vs 7
1	2	Jack Carlin; Jason Kenny; Ryan Owens	Great Britain	42.661		QG
2	7	Tomáš Bábek; David Sojka; Pavel Kelemen	Czech Republic	44.628	+1.967	
3 vs 6
1	3	Grégory Baugé; Quentin Lafargue; Sébastien Vigier	France	43.481		QB
2	5	Denis Dmitriev; Aleksei Tkachev; Pavel Yakushevskiy	Russia	44.203	+0.722	
4 vs 5
1	4	Marc Jurczyk; Eric Engler; Maximilian Levy	Germany	43.772		QB
2	6	Maciej Bielecki; Krzysztof Maksel; Mateusz Rudyk	Poland	44.593	+0.821	

=== Finals ===
Rank	Name	Nation	Time	Behind	Notes
Gold medal final
1st place, gold medalist(s)	Jeffrey Hoogland; Harrie Lavreysen; Roy van den Berg	Netherlands	42.151		
2nd place, silver medalist(s)	Jack Carlin; Jason Kenny; Ryan Owens	Great Britain	42.822	+0.671	
Bronze medal final
3rd place, bronze medalist(s)	Grégory Baugé; Quentin Lafargue; Sébastien Vigier	France	43.206		
4	Marc Jurczyk; Eric Engler; Maximilian Levy	Germany	43.600	+0.394	
