= Cycling at the 2010 Commonwealth Games – Men's sprint =

The Men's individual sprint took place at 6 and 7 October 2010 at the Indira Gandhi Arena.

== Preliminaries ==
200 metre time trial.

Rank	Rider	Time	Average Speed (km/h)
1	Shane Perkins (AUS)	10.058, CWG	71.584
2	Scott Sunderland (AUS)	10.151	70.928
3	Ross Edgar (SCO)	10.367	69.451
4	Sam Webster (NZL)	10.390	69.297
5	Daniel Ellis (AUS)	10.429	69.038
6	Edward Dawkins (NZL)	10.430	69.031
7	Ethan Mitchell (NZL)	10.440	68.965
8	Travis Smith (CAN)	10.445	68.932
9	David Daniell (ENG)	10.459	68.840
10	Njisane Phillip (TRI)	10.517	68.460
11	Peter Mitchell (ENG)	10.542	68.298
12	Chris Pritchard (SCO)	10.633	67.713
13	Azizulhasni Awang (MAS)	10.651	67.599
14	Muhammad Md Yunos (MAS)	10.659	67.548
15	Lewis Oliva (WAL)	10.677	67.434
16	John Paul (SCO)	10.750	66.976
17	Christopher Sellier (TRI)	10.912	65.982
18	Haseem McLean (TRI)	11.101	64.859
19	Bikram Singh (IND)	11.594	62.101
20	Prince Hylem (IND)	11.892	60.544
21	Amrit Singh (IND)	12.174	59.142
–	Barry Forde (BAR)	DNS	
–	Josiah Ng (MAS)	DNS	
–	Bernard Esterhuizen (RSA)	DNS	

== Results ==
=== Quarterfinals ===
The eight cyclists qualified from Rounds 1 and 2 were paired for a best two-out-of-three series of 200 metre races. None of the pairings required a third race.

Heat	Rank	Name	Nation	Race 1	Race 2	Decider	Notes
1	1	Shane Perkins	Australia	10.623	10.433		Q
1	2	Ross Edgar	Scotland				
2	1	Scott Sunderland	Australia	10.836	10.615		Q
2	2	David Daniell	England				
3	1	Edward Dawkins	New Zealand	11.111	10.752		Q
3	2	Njisane Phillip	Trinidad and Tobago				
4	1	Sam Webster	New Zealand	10.765	10.688		Q
4	2	Travis Smith	Canada				

=== Race for 5th-8th Places ===
Rank	Name	Nation	Time
5	Njisane Phillip	Trinidad and Tobago	10.946
6	Ross Edgar	Scotland	
7	Travis Smith	Canada	
8	David Daniell	England	

=== Semifinals ===
Heat	Rank	Name	Nation	Race 1	Race 2	Decider	Notes
1	1	Shane Perkins	Australia	10.607	10.687		Q
1	2	Sam Webster	New Zealand				
2	1	Scott Sunderland	Australia	10.348	10.719		Q
2	2	Edward Dawkins	New Zealand				

=== Finals ===
Rank	Name	Nation	Race 1	Race 2	Decider
Gold Medal Races
1st place, gold medalist(s)	Shane Perkins	Australia	10.455	10.310	
2nd place, silver medalist(s)	Scott Sunderland	Australia			
Bronze Medal Races
3rd place, bronze medalist(s)	Sam Webster	New Zealand	10.616	11.131	
4	Edward Dawkins	New Zealand			
