= Cycling at the 2010 Commonwealth Games – Men's team sprint =

The men's team sprint at the 2010 Commonwealth Games took place on 8 October 2010 at the Indira Gandhi Arena.

== Qualification ==
Rank	Country	Cyclists	Result
1	Australia	Daniel Ellis; Jason Niblett; Scott Sunderland	44.488
2	New Zealand	Edward Dawkins; Ethan Mitchell; Sam Webster	44.583
3	Malaysia	Azizulhasni Awang; Josiah Ng; Mohd Rizal Tisin	45.378
4	Scotland	John Paul; Chris Pritchard; Callum Skinner	46.724
5	Trinidad and Tobago	Njisane Phillip; Christopher Sellier; Thireef Smart	47.391
6	India	Prince Hylem; Bikram Singh; Amrit Singh	50.216

== Finals ==
Final

Rank	Name	Time
1st place, gold medalist(s)	Australia	43.772 (CWG)
2nd place, silver medalist(s)	New Zealand	44.239

Bronze medal match

Rank	Name	Time
3rd place, bronze medalist(s)	Malaysia	45.040
4	Scotland	46.273
