= 2013 UCI Track Cycling World Championships – Men's team sprint =

Rainbow jersey

The Men's team sprint at the 2013 UCI Track Cycling World Championships was held on February 21. 15 nations of 3 cyclists each participated in the contest. After the qualifying, the fastest 2 teams raced for gold, and 3rd and 4th teams raced for bronze.

== Medalists ==
Gold	Germany; René Enders; Stefan Bötticher; Maximilian Levy
Silver	New Zealand; Ethan Mitchell; Sam Webster; Edward Dawkins
Bronze	France; Julien Palma; François Pervis; Michaël D'Almeida

== Results ==
=== Qualifying ===
The qualifying was held at 15:20.

Rank	Name	Nation	Time	Notes
1	Edward Dawkins; Ethan Mitchell; Sam Webster	New Zealand	43.580	Q
2	René Enders; Maximilian Levy; Stefan Bötticher	Germany	43.731	Q
3	Julien Palma; Michaël D'Almeida; François Pervis	France	43.792	Q
4	Matthew Glaetzer; Mitchell Bullen; Scott Sunderland	Australia	43.890	Q
5	Denis Dmitriev; Andrey Kubeev; Sergei Kucherov	Russia	44.264	
6	Philip Hindes; Kian Emadi-Coffin; Jason Kenny	Great Britain	44.270	
7	Yudai Nitta; Seiichiro Nakagawa; Kazunari Watanabe	Japan	44.332	
8	Cheng Changsong; Zhang Lei; Zhang Miao	China	44.855	
9	Grzegorz Drejgier; Kamil Kuczyński; Damian Zieliński	Poland	44.872	
10	Hugo Haak; Jeffrey Hoogland; Matthijs Büchli	Netherlands	45.097	
11	José Moreno Sánchez; Hodei Mazquiarán Uría; Juan Peralta Gascon	Spain	45.259	
12	Pavel Kelemen; Adam Ptáčník; Tomáš Bábek	Czech Republic	45.464	
13	Sotirios Bretas; Christos Volikakis; Zafeiris Volikakis	Greece	45.576	
14	Andrii Sach; Andriy Kutsenko; Andrii Vynokurov	Ukraine	45.615	
15	Amarjeet Singh; Amrit Singh; Bikram Singh	India	55.106	

=== Finals ===
The finals were held at 21:10.

==== Small Final ====
Rank	Name	Nation	Time	Notes
3rd place, bronze medalist(s)	Julien Palma; Michaël D'Almeida; François Pervis	France	43.798	
4	Matthew Glaetzer; Mitchell Bullen; Scott Sunderland	Australia	44.005	

==== Final ====
Rank	Name	Nation	Time	Notes
1st place, gold medalist(s)	René Enders; Maximilian Levy; Stefan Bötticher	Germany	43.495	
2nd place, silver medalist(s)	Edward Dawkins; Ethan Mitchell; Sam Webster	New Zealand	43.544	
