= Cycling at the 2018 Commonwealth Games – Men's team sprint =

Cycling Track – Men's team sprint at the 2018 Commonwealth Games
- Venue: Anna Meares Velodrome
- Dates: 5 April
- Competitors: 25 from 8 nations
- Winning time: 42.877

Medalists
gold medal	Ethan Mitchell; Sam Webster; Eddie Dawkins	New Zealand
silver medal	Ryan Owens; Joseph Truman; Philip Hindes	England
bronze medal	Nathan Hart; Jacob Schmid; Patrick Constable; Matthew Glaetzer	Australia

The men's team sprint at the 2018 Commonwealth Games was part of the cycling programme, which took place on 5 April 2018.

== Records ==
Prior to this competition, the existing world and Games records were as follows:

World record	Germany (René Enders, Robert Förstemann, Joachim Eilers)	41.871	Aguascalientes, Mexico	5 December 2013
Games record	New Zealand (Ethan Mitchell, Sam Webster, Eddie Dawkins)	43.181	Glasgow, Scotland	24 July 2014

== Schedule ==
The schedule is as follows:

All times are Australian Eastern Standard Time (UTC+10)

Date	Time	Round
Thursday 5 April 2018	16:34	Qualifying
Thursday 5 April 2018	20:58 / 21:02	Finals

== Results ==
=== Qualifying ===
The two fastest teams advance to the gold medal final. The next two fastest teams advance to the bronze medal final.

Rank	Nation	Time	Behind	Notes
1	New Zealand; Ethan Mitchell; Eddie Dawkins; Sam Webster	42.822	—	QG, GR
2	England; Ryan Owens; Joseph Truman; Philip Hindes	43.516	+0.694	QG
3	Australia; Nathan Hart; Matthew Glaetzer; Patrick Constable	44.205	+1.383	QB
4	Canada; Patrice St-Louis Pivin; Stefan Ritter; Hugo Barrette	44.346	+1.524	QB
5	Malaysia; Muhammad Khairil Nizam Rasol; Muhammad Sahrom; Muhammad Fadhil Mohd Zonis	44.760	+1.938	
6	Trinidad and Tobago; Njisane Phillip; Kwesi Browne; Nicholas Paul	45.386	+2.564	
7	India; Sanuraj Sanandaraj; Sahil Kumar; Ranjit Singh	46.174	+3.352	
8	Seychelles; Christopher Gerry; Stephen Belle; Jeff Esparon	53.214	+10.392	

=== Finals ===
The final classification is determined in the medal finals.

Rank	Nation	Time	Behind	Notes
Bronze medal final
3rd place, bronze medalist(s)	Australia; Nathan Hart; Jacob Schmid; Patrick Constable	43.645	–	
4	Canada; Patrice St-Louis Pivin; Stefan Ritter; Hugo Barrette	44.943	+1.298	
Gold medal final
1st place, gold medalist(s)	New Zealand; Ethan Mitchell; Sam Webster; Eddie Dawkins	42.877	–	
2nd place, silver medalist(s)	England; Ryan Owens; Joseph Truman; Philip Hindes	43.547	+0.670	
