= Cycling at the 2019 European Games – Men's team sprint =

Men's team sprint at the 2019 European Games
- Venue: Minsk Velodrome
- Date: 27 June
- Competitors: 28 from 8 nations
- Winning time: 42.385

Medalists
| gold medal | Roy van den Berg; Harrie Lavreysen; Jeffrey Hoogland; Nils van 't Hoenderdaal | Netherlands |
| silver medal | Grégory Baugé; Rayan Helal; Quentin Caleyron; Quentin Lafargue | France |
| bronze medal | Jack Carlin; Jason Kenny; Ryan Owens; Joseph Truman | Great Britain |

The men's cycling team sprint at the 2019 European Games was held at the Minsk Velodrome on 27 June 2019.

== Results ==
=== Qualifying ===
The eight fastest teams advanced to the first round.

| Rank | Name | Nation | Time | Behind | Notes |
|---|---|---|---|---|---|
| 1 | Nils van 't Hoenderdaal; Harrie Lavreysen; Jeffrey Hoogland | Netherlands | 43.111 | | Q |
| 2 | Jack Carlin; Jason Kenny; Ryan Owens | Great Britain | 43.517 | +0.406 | Q |
| 3 | Grégory Baugé; Quentin Caleyron; Quentin Lafargue | France | 43.744 | +0.633 | Q |
| 4 | Pavel Kelemen; Martin Čechman; Tomáš Bábek | Czech Republic | 43.843 | +0.732 | Q |
| 5 | Shane Perkins; Denis Dmitriev; Pavel Yakushevskiy | Russia | 43.944 | +0.833 | Q |
| 6 | Aliaksandr Hlova; Artsiom Zaitsau; Uladzislau Novik | Belarus | 44.060 | +0.949 | Q |
| 7 | Maciej Bielecki; Krzysztof Maksel; Mateusz Rudyk | Poland | 44.092 | +0.981 | Q |
| 8 | Alejandro Martínez; Juan Peralta; José Moreno Sánchez | Spain | 45.388 | +2.277 | Q |
| 9 | Vladyslav Denysenko; Tadei-Ivan Chebanets; Dmytro Stovbetskyi | Ukraine | 45.829 | +2.718 | |
| 10 | Davide Boscaro; Francesco Ceci; Stefano Moro | Italy | 47.341 | +4.230 | |

=== First round ===
First round heats were held as follows:
Heat 1: 4th v 5th fastest
Heat 2: 3rd v 6th fastest
Heat 3: 2nd v 7th fastest
Heat 4: 1st v 8th fastest

The heat winners were ranked on time, from which the top 2 proceeded to the gold medal final and the other 2 proceeded to the bronze medal final.

| Rank | Overall rank | Name | Nation | Time | Behind | Notes |
|---|---|---|---|---|---|---|
1 vs 8
| 1 | 1 | Roy van den Berg; Harrie Lavreysen; Jeffrey Hoogland | Netherlands | 42.342 | | QG |
| 2 | 8 | Alejandro Martínez; Juan Peralta; José Moreno Sánchez | Spain | 44.896 | +2.554 | |
2 vs 7
| 1 | 3 | Jack Carlin; Joseph Truman; Ryan Owens | Great Britain | 43.456 | | QB |
| 2 | 7 | Maciej Bielecki; Krzysztof Maksel; Mateusz Rudyk | Poland | 43.794 | +0.338 | |
3 vs 6
| 1 | 2 | Grégory Baugé; Rayan Helal; Quentin Lafargue | France | 43.445 | | QG |
| 2 | 6 | Aliaksandr Hlova; Artsiom Zaitsau; Uladzislau Novik | Belarus | 43.745 | +0.300 | |
4 vs 5
| 1 | 4 | Pavel Kelemen; Martin Čechman; Tomáš Bábek | Czech Republic | 43.581 | | QB |
| 2 | 5 | Alexander Sharapov; Denis Dmitriev; Pavel Yakushevskiy | Russia | 43.634 | +0.053 | |

=== Finals ===
| Rank | Name | Nation | Time | Behind | Notes |
|---|---|---|---|---|---|
Gold medal final
| 1st place, gold medalist(s) | Roy van den Berg; Harrie Lavreysen; Jeffrey Hoogland | Netherlands | 42.385 | | |
| 2nd place, silver medalist(s) | Grégory Baugé; Rayan Helal; Quentin Caleyron | France | 43.787 | +1.402 | |
Bronze medal final
| 3rd place, bronze medalist(s) | Jack Carlin; Jason Kenny; Ryan Owens | Great Britain | 43.020 | | |
| 4 | Pavel Kelemen; Martin Čechman; Tomáš Bábek | Czech Republic | 43.755 | +0.735 | |
