= Bradly Knipe =

New Zealand cyclist (born 1998)

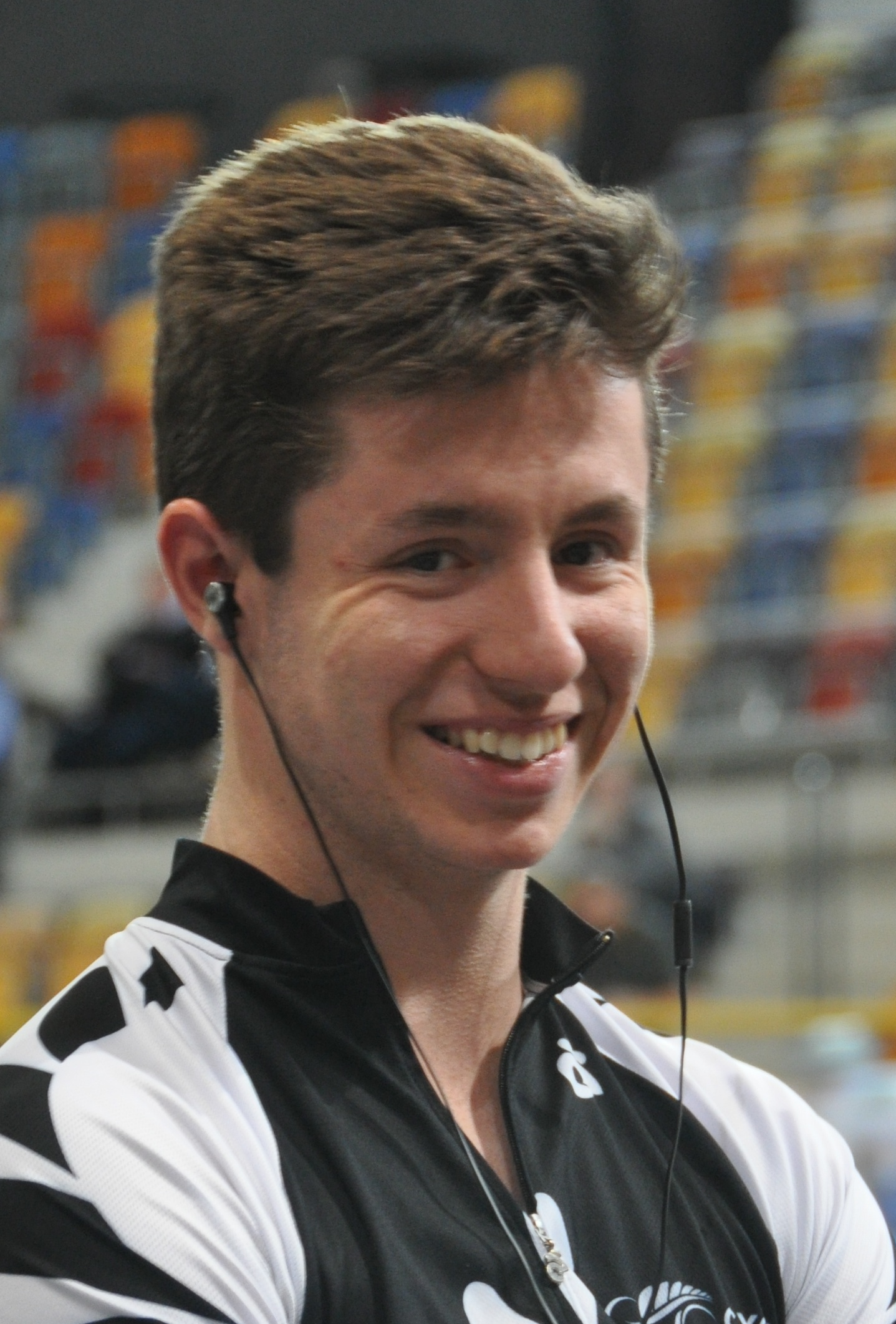
- Knipe in 2016

Personal information
- Born: 11 December 1998 (age 27) Invercargill

Cycling career
- Sport: Cycling
- Discipline: Track
- Role: Rider
- Rider type: Sprinter
Medal record
Men's track cycling
Representing New Zealand
Commonwealth Games
Bronze medal – third place	2022 Birmingham	Team sprint

Bradly Knipe (born 11 December 1998) is a track cyclist from New Zealand.

Knipe is from Invercargill on the South Island of New Zealand. Knipe won at the 2016 UCI Junior Track Cycling World Championships to become the junior sprint world champion at Switzerland in 2016, winning the gold in the individual sprint in the deciding third race over Australia's Conor Rowley. Prior to this he had won a silver in the 1000m Time Trial at the same event where he was runner up to Stefan Ritter. In January 2020 Knipe won the New Zealand national championship in the omnium. In June 2022, Knipe was named in the New Zealand sprint squad for the 2022 Commonwealth Games in Birmingham, England.
