= 2014 UCI Track Cycling World Championships – Men's team sprint =

The Men's team sprint at the 2014 UCI Track Cycling World Championships was held on 26 February 2014. Thirty-six cyclists from 12 countries participated in the contest. After all teams have contested qualifying, the fastest two squads advanced to the final and raced for the gold medal, while the teams ranked third and fourth, raced for the bronze medal.

== Medalists ==
Gold	New Zealand; Ethan Mitchell; Sam Webster; Edward Dawkins
Silver	Germany; René Enders; Robert Förstemann; Maximilian Levy
Bronze	France; Grégory Baugé; Kévin Sireau; Michaël D'Almeida

== Results ==
=== Qualifying ===
The qualifying was started at 19:20.

Rank	Name	Nation	Time	Notes
1	Ethan Mitchell; Sam Webster; Edward Dawkins	New Zealand	43.065	
2	René Enders; Robert Förstemann; Maximilian Levy	Germany	43.301	
3	Pavel Yakushevskiy; Denis Dmitriev; Nikita Shurshin	Russia	43.454	
4	Grégory Baugé; Kévin Sireau; Michaël D'Almeida	France	43.486	
5	Philip Hindes; Jason Kenny; Kian Emadi	Great Britain	43.617	
6	Daniel Ellis; Shane Perkins; Matthew Glaetzer	Australia	43.658	
7	Maciej Bielecki; Damian Zieliński; Krzysztof Maksel	Poland	43.885	
8	Jeffrey Hoogland; Hugo Haak; Matthijs Büchli	Netherlands	43.925	
9	José Moreno Sanchez; Juan Peralta; Hodei Mazquiarán	Spain	44.753	
10	Rubén Murillo; Leonardo Narváez; Santiago Ramírez	Colombia	44.924	
11	Tomoyuki Kawabata; Kazunari Watanabe; Seiichiro Nakagawa	Japan	44.938	
12	Hu Ke; Zhang Miao; Xu Chao	China	45.131	

=== Finals ===
The finals were started at 20:45.

Rank	Name	Nation	Time	Notes
Gold Medal Race
1st place, gold medalist(s)	Ethan Mitchell; Sam Webster; Edward Dawkins	New Zealand	42.840	
2nd place, silver medalist(s)	René Enders; Robert Förstemann; Maximilian Levy	Germany	42.885	
Bronze Medal Race
3rd place, bronze medalist(s)	Grégory Baugé; Kévin Sireau; Michaël D'Almeida	France	43.285	
4	Pavel Yakushevskiy; Denis Dmitriev; Nikita Shurshin	Russia	43.309	
