= Patryk Rajkowski =

Polish cyclist (born 1996)

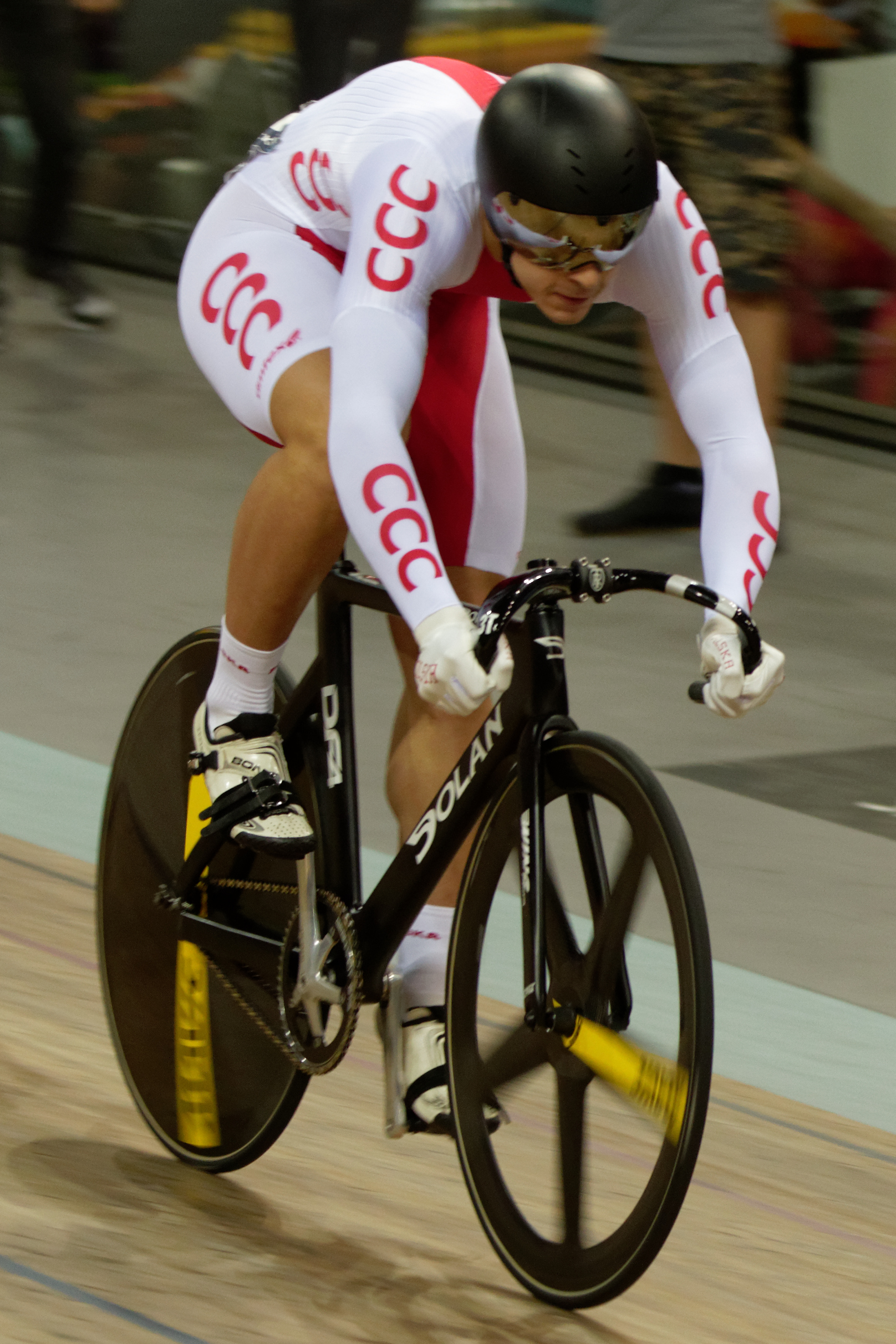
- Rajkowski at the 2016 UEC European Track Championships

Personal information
- Born: 22 February 1996 (age 30) Kórnik, Poland

Cycling career
- Sport: Cycling
- Discipline: Track
- Role: Rider
- Rider type: Sprinter
Medal record
Men's track cycling
Representing Poland
European Championships
Silver medal – second place	2023 Grenchen	Keirin
Bronze medal – third place	2021 Grenchen	1 km time trial
Bronze medal – third place	2021 Grenchen	Team sprint

Patryk Rajkowski (born 22 February 1996) is a Polish track cyclist, who competes in sprinting events. He qualified to compete in the sprint and team sprint events at the 2020 Summer Olympics. He also competed in the keirin at the 2018 UCI Track Cycling World Championships.

== Major results ==
2013
3rd Team sprint, European Junior Track Championships
2014
European Junior Track Championships

1st Keirin
2nd Team sprint
3rd Sprint

2nd Team sprint, European Under-23 Track Championships
UCI Junior Track World Championships

3rd Keirin
3rd Team sprint

2015
National Under-23 Track Championships

1st Sprint
1st Kilometer

2nd Team sprint, European Under-23 Track Championships
2017
3rd Team sprint, European Under-23 Track Championships
2018
2018–19 UCI World Cup

3rd Team sprint, Hong Kong

2019
2019–20 UCI World Cup

2nd Team sprint, Cambridge
2nd Team sprint, Brisbane

2020
1st Kilometer, National Track Championships
