= Cycling at the 2014 Commonwealth Games – Men's team sprint =

Cycling Track – Men's sprint at the 2014 Commonwealth Games
- Venue: Sir Chris Hoy Velodrome
- Dates: 24 July 2014
- Competitors: 27 from 9 nations

Medalists
gold medal	Eddie Dawkins; Ethan Mitchell; Sam Webster	New Zealand
silver medal	Kian Emadi; Jason Kenny; Philip Hindes	England
bronze medal	Matthew Glaetzer; Nathan Hart; Shane Perkins	Australia

The Men's team sprint at the 2014 Commonwealth Games, was part of the cycling programme, which took place on 24 July 2014.

== Qualification ==
Rank	Country	Cyclists	Result
1	New Zealand	Eddie Dawkins; Ethan Mitchell; Sam Webster	43.254; GR
2	England	Kian Emadi; Jason Kenny; Philip Hindes	43.730
3	Australia	Matthew Glaetzer; Nathan Hart; Shane Perkins	44.027
4	Canada	Hugo Barrette; Vincent De Haître; Joseph Veloce	45.302
5	Scotland	Jonny Biggin; Chris Pritchard; Callum Skinner	45.501
6	Malaysia	Mohd Azizulhasni Awang; Muhammad Edrus Md Yunos; Josiah Ng	45.625
7	India	Alan Baby; Amarjit Nagi; Amrit Singh	49.233
8	Barbados	Jamol Eastmond; Jesse Kelly; Javed Mounter	49.239
9	Bangladesh	Alomgir Alomgir; Tarikul Islam; Iftekhar Refat	58.350

== Finals ==
Gold medal match

Rank	Country	Cyclists	Result
1st place, gold medalist(s)	New Zealand	Eddie Dawkins; Ethan Mitchell; Sam Webster	43.181; GR
2nd place, silver medalist(s)	England	Kian Emadi; Jason Kenny; Philip Hindes	43.706

Bronze medal match

Rank	Country	Cyclists	Result
3rd place, bronze medalist(s)	Australia	Matthew Glaetzer; Nathan Hart; Shane Perkins	43.709
4	Canada	Hugo Barrette; Vincent De Haître; Joseph Veloce	45.054
