= Jacob Schmid =

Australian cyclist (born 1994)

Personal information
- Full name: Jacob Karl Rodger Schmid
- Nickname: Schmiddy
- Born: 18 January 1994 (age 32) Malvern, Victoria
- Height: 185 cm (6 ft 1 in)

Cycling career
- Sport: Cycling
- Current team: Australian Cycling Team
- Discipline: Track sprint
- Role: Rider
- Rider type: Sprinter
Medal record
Men's track cycling
Representing Australia
Commonwealth Games
| Bronze medal – third place | 2018 Gold Coast | Sprint |
| Bronze medal – third place | 2018 Gold Coast | Team sprint |
Oceania Championships
| Gold medal – first place | 2014 Adelaide | Keirin |
| Silver medal – second place | 2018 Cambridge | Keirin |
| Silver medal – second place | 2018 Cambridge | Team sprint |

Jacob Karl Rodger Schmid (born 18 January 1994) is an Australian professional track sprint cyclist from Melbourne, Victoria. He represented Australia at the 2018 Commonwealth Games, where he won bronze in the elite men's individual sprint and team sprint (alongside Nathan Hart, Patrick Constable and Matthew Glaetzer).

As a junior rider, Schmid competed at the 2012 UCI Junior World Track Cycling Championships in Invercargill (New Zealand), where he won gold in the individual sprint and keirin events. He was also a member of the junior men's team sprint (alongside Emerson Harwood and Zachary Shaw), which qualified fastest in a junior world record time (44.825s), before an illegal change saw the team relegated in the gold medal final.
