= Julien Palma =

French cyclist

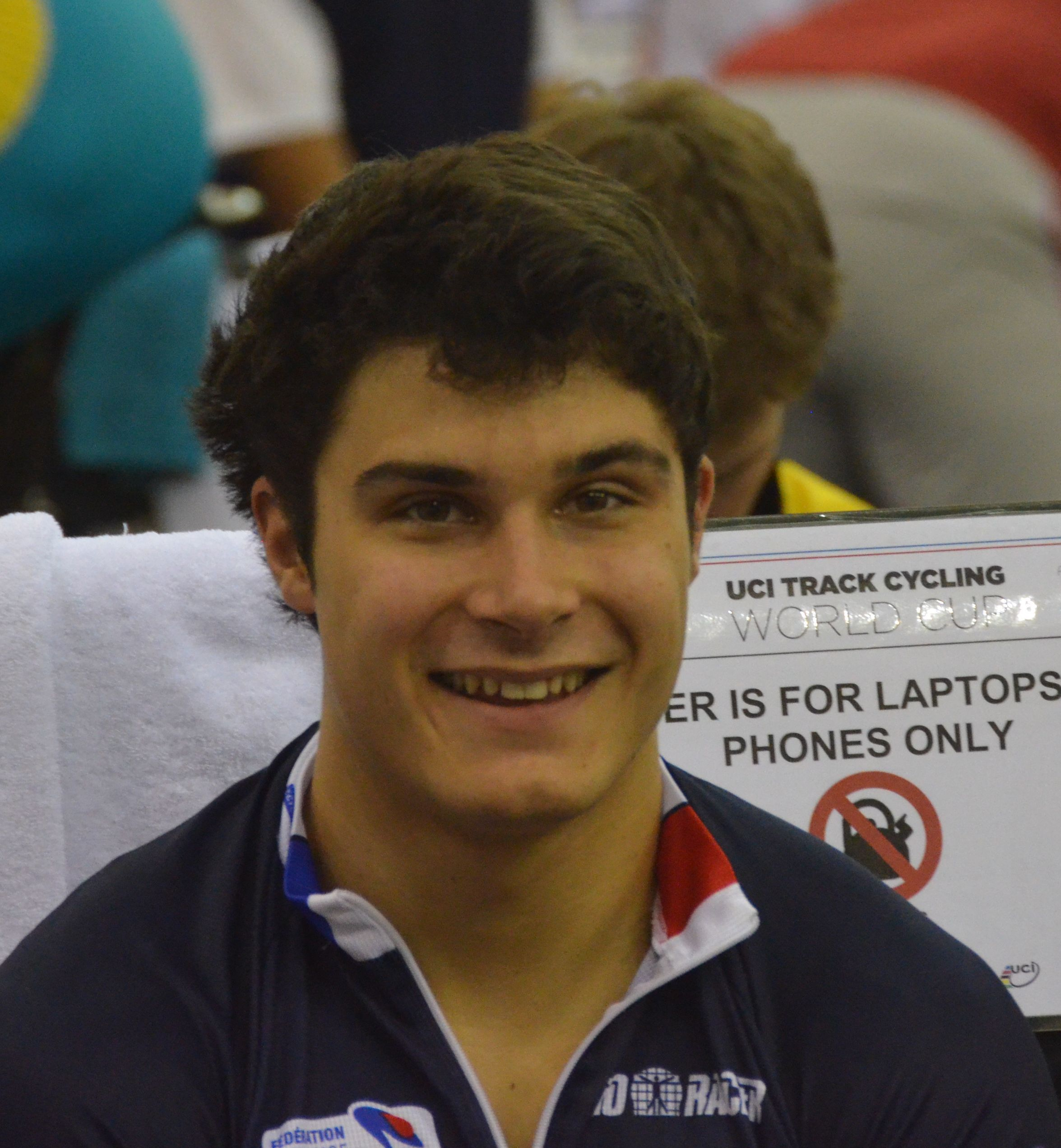

Personal information
- Born: 1 January 1993 (age 33)

Cycling career
- Sport: Cycling
- Discipline: Track cycling
- Role: Rider
- Rider type: team sprint

Julien Palma (born 1 January 1993) is a French male track cyclist. He won the bronze medal in the team sprint event at the 2013 UCI Track Cycling World Championships.
