= Nathan Hart =

Australian cyclist (born 1993)

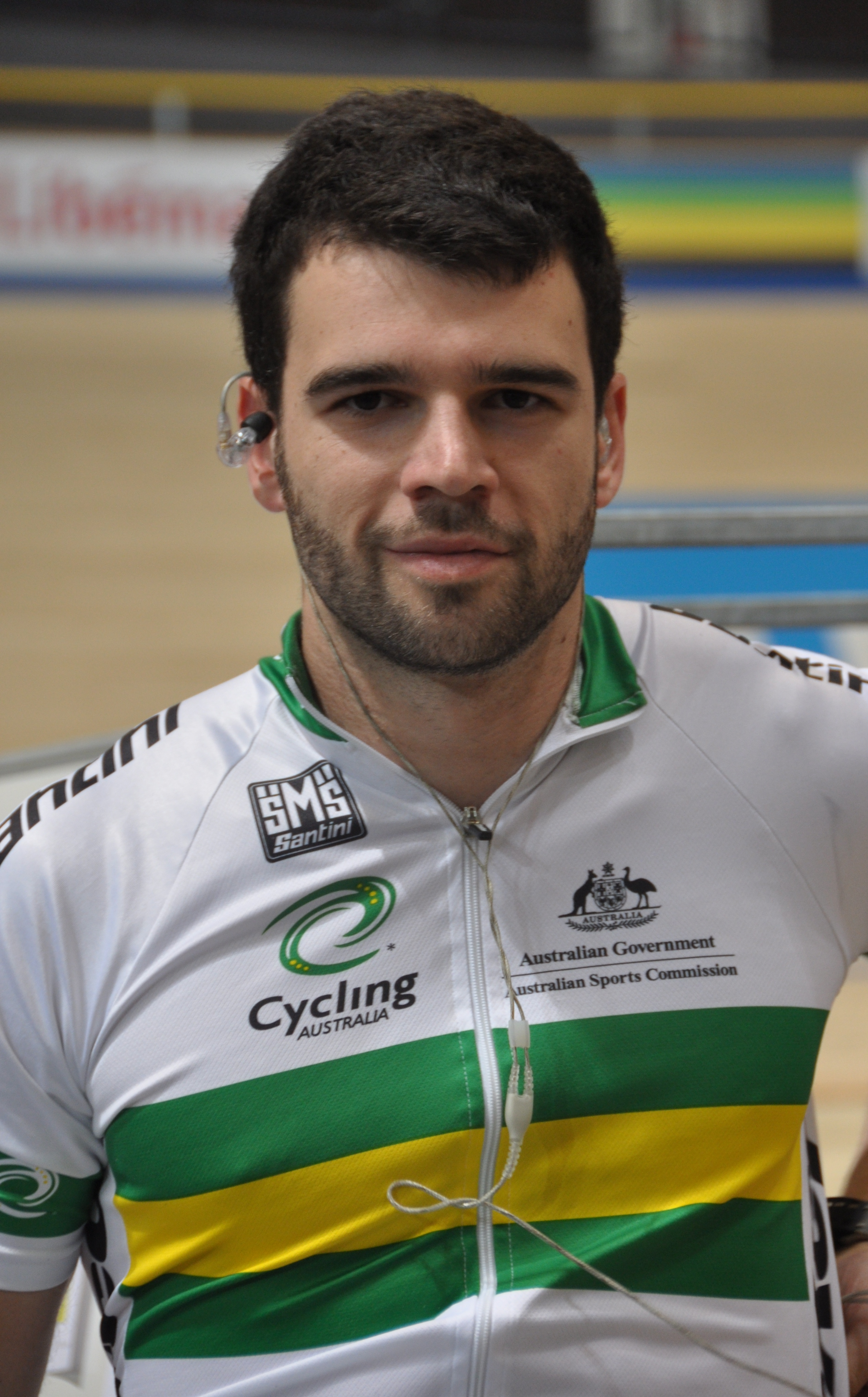
- Nathan Hart (2016)

Personal information
- Born: 4 March 1993 (age 33) Canberra, Australia
- Height: 1.80 m (5 ft 11 in)
- Weight: 90 kg (198 lb)

Cycling career
- Sport: Cycling
- Discipline: Track
- Role: Rider
- Rider type: Sprint
Medal record
World Championships
Bronze medal – third place	2020 Berlin	Team sprint
Commonwealth Games
Bronze medal – third place	2014 Glasgow	Team sprint
Bronze medal – third place	2018 Gold Coast	Team sprint

Nathan Hart (born 4 March 1993) is an Australian former track cyclist. He represented Australia at the Rio 2016 Olympics and the Tokyo 2020 Olympics

== Early years ==
Hart's father, Braham, was a track cyclist, and he was an inspiration to him. Hart was identified by the ACT Academy of Sport talent search program and appeared at his first senior national championships in 2012. With his father willing him on, Hart made his world cup debut in late 2013, where he finished third in the Team Sprint.

== Achievements ==
Hart competed at the 2016 Olympic Games where he finished 4th in the Team Sprint with Matthew Glaetzer and Patrick Constable. He also competed at the 2014 Commonwealth Games where he finished 3rd in the Team Sprint with Shane Perkins and Matthew Glaetzer. He represented Australia at the 2015 UCI Track Cycling World Championships and the 2016 UCI Track Cycling World Championships

At the 2018 Commonwealth Games, Hart finished 3rd in the team sprint event alongside Jacob Schmid and Patrick Constable.
