= Ryan Owens (cyclist) =

British cyclist (born 1995)

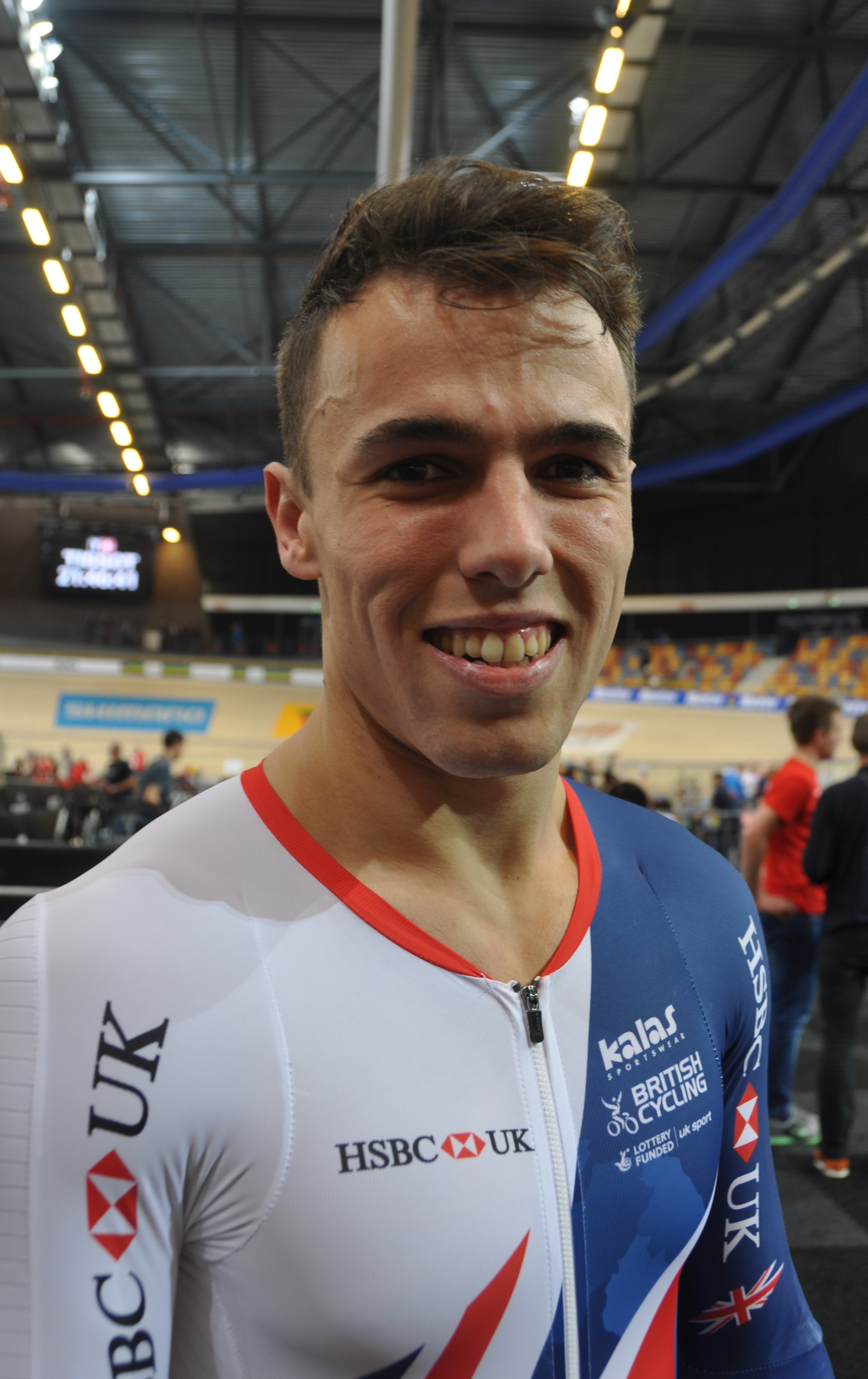
- Owens in 2018

Personal information
- Born: 29 September 1995 (age 31) Maulden, Bedfordshire, England
- Height: 1.73 m (5 ft 8 in)
- Weight: 78 kg (172 lb)

Cycling career
- Sport: Cycling
- Current team: Great Britain Cycling Team/SES Racing
- Discipline: Track cycling
- Role: Rider
Medal record
Men's track cycling
Representing Great Britain
Event	1st	2nd	3rd
Olympic Games	0	1	0
World Championships	0	2	0
European Games	0	0	1
European Championships	0	2	0
Commonwealth Games	0	2	0
Total	0	7	1
Olympic Games
Silver medal – second place	2020 Tokyo	Team sprint
World Championships
Silver medal – second place	2018 Apeldoorn	Team sprint
Silver medal – second place	2020 Berlin	Team sprint
European Games
Bronze medal – third place	2019 Minsk	Team sprint
European Championships
Silver medal – second place	2016 Yvelines	Team sprint
Silver medal – second place	2019 Apeldoorn	Team sprint
Representing England
Commonwealth Games
Silver medal – second place	2018 Gold Coast	Team sprint
Silver medal – second place	2022 Birmingham	Team sprint

Ryan Owens (born 29 September 1995) is a British former track cyclist, specialising in sprint events, who represented Great Britain and England at international competitions. He won a silver medal at the Tokyo 2020 Olympic Games in the team sprint alongside Jack Carlin and Jason Kenny.

== Early life ==
Owens grew up around cycling, with both his father and grandfather having raced competitively. He was competing by the age of 16. His first national-level achievement was a second place in the time trial at the 2011 National Junior Track Championships in the under-16 category.

== Cycling career ==
Owens is a consecutive four-time British team sprint champion having won the Team Sprint Championship at the 2017, 2018, 2019 and 2020 British National Track Championships. He also won the Individual Sprint title at the 2017 British National Track Championships.

At the 2018 Commonwealth Games, Owens won silver in the team sprint event alongside Joseph Truman and Philip Hindes.

On 21 June 2021, Owens was named in the Great Britain squad for the Tokyo 2020 Olympics. He competed in the team sprint alongside Jason Kenny and Jack Carlin, winning a silver medal behind the Olympic Record-setting Dutch team.

At the 2022 Commonwealth Games, Owens won a silver medal – his second Commonwealth Games medal – in the team sprint, this time with Truman and Hamish Turnbull. He was knocked out in the 1/8 finals of the sprint event by eventual champion Matthew Richardson.

== Retirement from professional cycling ==
Owens announced his retirement from track cycling and the Great Britain Cycling Team in April 2024. He achieved a Master's in Business Administration at London Business School and is now working in consulting.

== Major results ==
2016
UCI Track Cycling World Cup

1st Team sprint, Round 1 (Glasgow)
1st Team sprint, Round 2 (Apeldoorn)

UEC European Track Championships

2nd Team sprint

2017
British National Track Championships

1st Team sprint
1st Individual Sprint

UCI Track Cycling World Cup

3rd Team Sprint, Round 1 (Pruszków)

UCI Track Cycling World Championships

4th Individual Sprint

2018
2018 British National Track Championships

1st Team sprint

UCI Track Cycling World Championships

2nd Team Sprint

2018 Commonwealth Games

2nd Team Sprint

UCI Track Cycling World Cup

2nd Team Sprint, Round 2 (Berlin)
2nd Team Sprint, Round 4 (London)
3rd Team Sprint, Round 1 (Milton, Ontario)

2019
UEC European Championships

2nd Team Sprint

UCI Track Cycling World Cup

2nd Team Sprint, Round 1 (Minsk)
2nd Team Sprint, Round 2 (Glasgow)

2019 European Games

3rd Team Sprint

2020
British National Track Championships

1st Team sprint

UCI Track Cycling World Championships

2nd Team Sprint

2021
Tokyo 2020 Olympic Games

2nd Team Sprint

2022
2022 Commonwealth Games

2nd Team Sprint

== See also ==
- List of European records in track cycling
