= Alexander Sharapov =

Russian cyclist

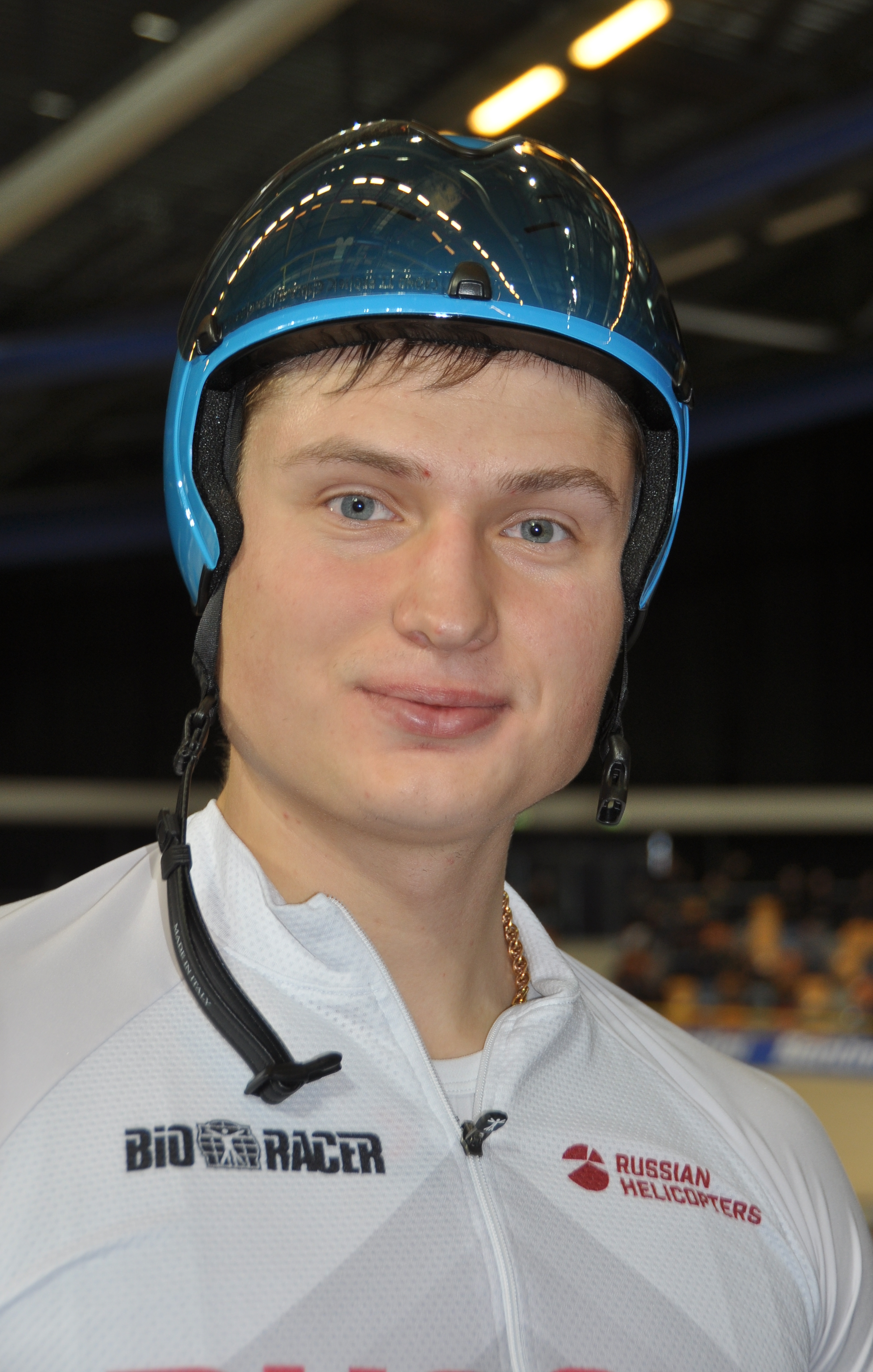

Personal information
- Born: 6 March 1994 (age 32) Moscow, Russia

Cycling career
- Sport: Cycling
- Discipline: Track cycling
- Role: Rider
Medal record
Men's track cycling
Representing Russia
World Championships
Bronze medal – third place	2019 Pruszków	Team sprint
European Championships
Gold medal – first place	2020 Plovdiv	Team sprint
Junior World Championships
Gold medal – first place	2012 Invercargill	Team sprint
Bronze medal – third place	2011 Moscow	Team sprint
U23 & Junior European Championships
Silver medal – second place	2012 Anadia	Junior Team sprint
Bronze medal – third place	2011 Anadia	Junior Team sprint
Bronze medal – third place	2015 Athens	U23 Team sprint

Alexander Yuryevich Sharapov (Russian: Александр Юрьевич Шарапов; born 6 March 1994) is a Russian track racing cyclist.

He participated at the 2019 UCI Track Cycling World Championships, winning a medal.
