= Jack Carlin =

Scottish cyclist (born 1997)

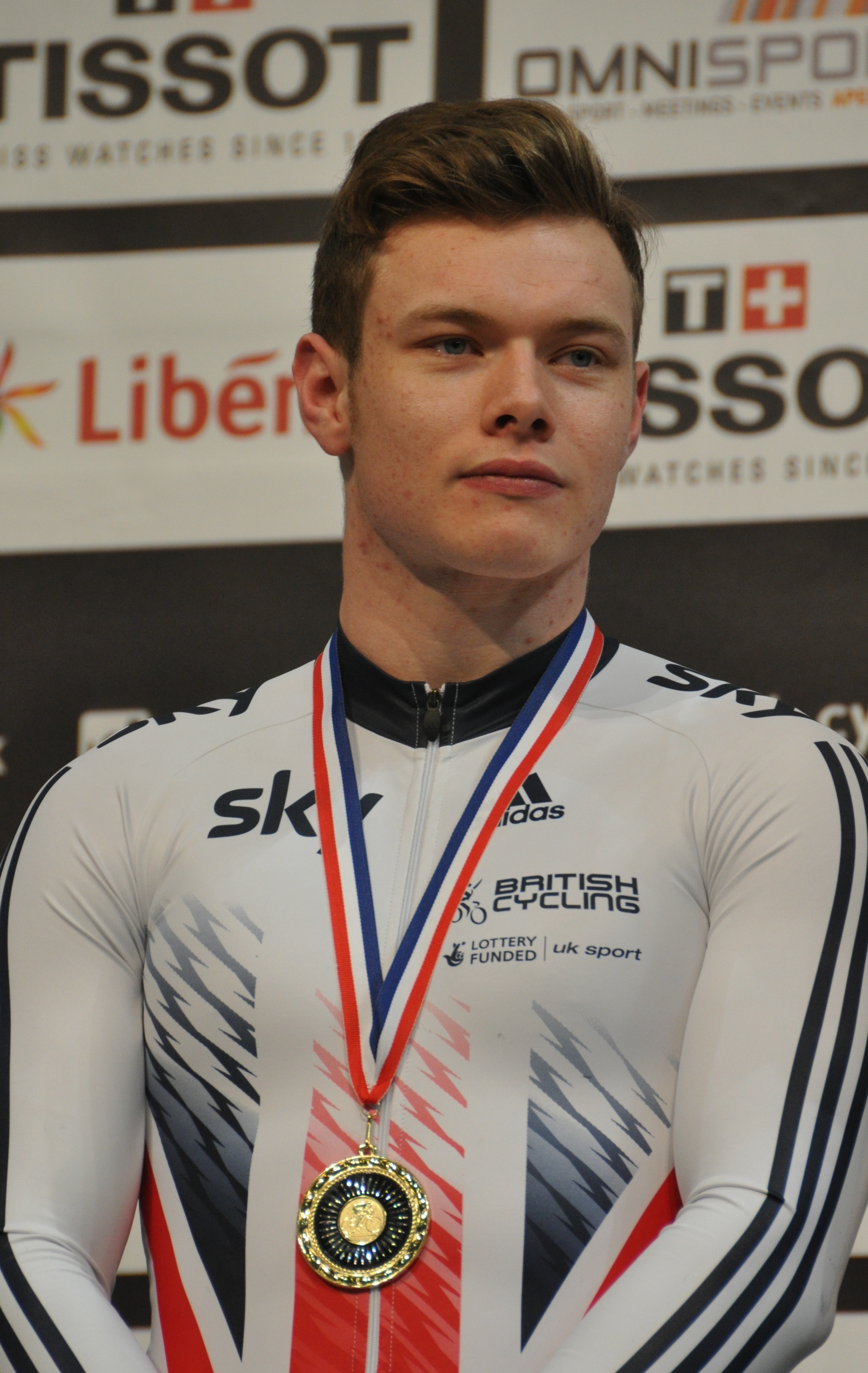
- Carlin in 2016

Personal information
- Full name: Jack Andrew Carlin
- Born: 23 April 1997 (age 29) Scotland
- Height: 177 cm (5 ft 10 in)
- Weight: 80 kg (176 lb)

Cycling career
- Sport: Cycling
- Discipline: Track
- Rider type: Sprinter
Medal record
Men's track cycling
Representing Great Britain
Event	1st	2nd	3rd
Olympic Games	0	2	2
World Championships	0	3	2
European Games	0	0	1
European Championships	0	4	2
Commonwealth Games	0	2	1
Total	0	11	8
Olympic Games
Silver medal – second place	2020 Tokyo	Team sprint
Silver medal – second place	2024 Paris	Team sprint
Bronze medal – third place	2020 Tokyo	Sprint
Bronze medal – third place	2024 Paris	Sprint
World Championships
Silver medal – second place	2018 Apeldoorn	Sprint
Silver medal – second place	2018 Apeldoorn	Team sprint
Silver medal – second place	2020 Berlin	Team sprint
Bronze medal – third place	2022 Saint-Quentin-en-Yvelines	Team sprint
Bronze medal – third place	2023 Glasgow	Sprint
European Games
Bronze medal – third place	2019 Minsk	Team sprint
European Championships
Silver medal – second place	2016 Saint-Quentin-en-Yvelines	Team sprint
Silver medal – second place	2019 Apeldoorn	Team sprint
Silver medal – second place	2022 Munich	Sprint
Silver medal – second place	2023 Grenchen	Team sprint
Bronze medal – third place	2018 Glasgow	Keirin
Bronze medal – third place	2022 Munich	Team sprint
Representing Scotland
Commonwealth Games
Silver medal – second place	2018 Gold Coast	Sprint
Silver medal – second place	2022 Birmingham	Keirin
Bronze medal – third place	2022 Birmingham	Sprint

Jack Andrew Carlin (born 23 April 1997) is a Scottish former track cyclist, who specialised in sprint events. He won four Olympic medals; two at the delayed 2020 Tokyo Olympics and two at the 2024 Paris Olympics.

== Cycling career ==
In 2016, Carlin won his first senior international medal when taking silver at the European Track Championships in the team sprint.

In 2018 he won silver medals at the World Championships in both the sprint and team sprint. This was followed by silver in the sprint at the Commonwealth Games and bronze at the European Championships in the keirin.

Carlin again achieved a silver medal in the team sprint at the 2020 World Championships. He then went on to become a double Olympic medallist at his debut Games in Tokyo, winning silver and bronze in the team sprint and sprint respectively.

At the 2022 British National Track Championships in Newport, Wales, he won three British titles (to add to his previous five) after winning the sprint, keirin and the team sprint. Later that year, he won silver in the keirin and bronze in the sprint at the 2022 Commonwealth Games. The latter was awarded following the relegation of Matthew Glaetzer in the deciding race after he was adjudged to have deviated from his racing line and unduly interfered with Carlin's sprint.

On 24 June 2024, Carlin was named in the Great Britain squad for the 2024 Summer Olympics. At the Games in Paris, he won a silver medal with Ed Lowe and Hamish Turnbull in the team sprint, losing out in the final to the Netherlands, who set a new world record. He won a bronze medal in the sprint, having been beaten by eventual champion Harrie Lavreysen in the semi-finals and defeating Jeffrey Hoogland in the bronze medal final. In the keirin, Carlin won his semi-final and advanced to the final, where he was involved in a last lap crash with two other riders.

Carlin announced his retirement from professional cycling in October 2025.

== Major results ==
2016
Track Cycling World Cup

1st Team sprint, Round 1 (Glasgow)
1st Team sprint, Round 2 (Apeldoorn)

European Track Championships

2nd Team sprint,

2018
UCI Track Cycling World Championships

2nd Team sprint
2nd Sprint

Commonwealth Games

2nd Sprint

European Track Championships

3rd Keirin

2019
European Track Championships

2nd Team sprint

2020
UCI Track Cycling World Championships

2nd Team sprint

2021
Olympic Games

2nd Team sprint
3rd Sprint

2022
Commonwealth Games

2nd Keirin
3rd Sprint

2024
Olympic Games

2nd Team sprint
3rd Sprint

== See also ==
- List of European Championship medalists in men's sprint
