= David Sojka =

Czech cyclist

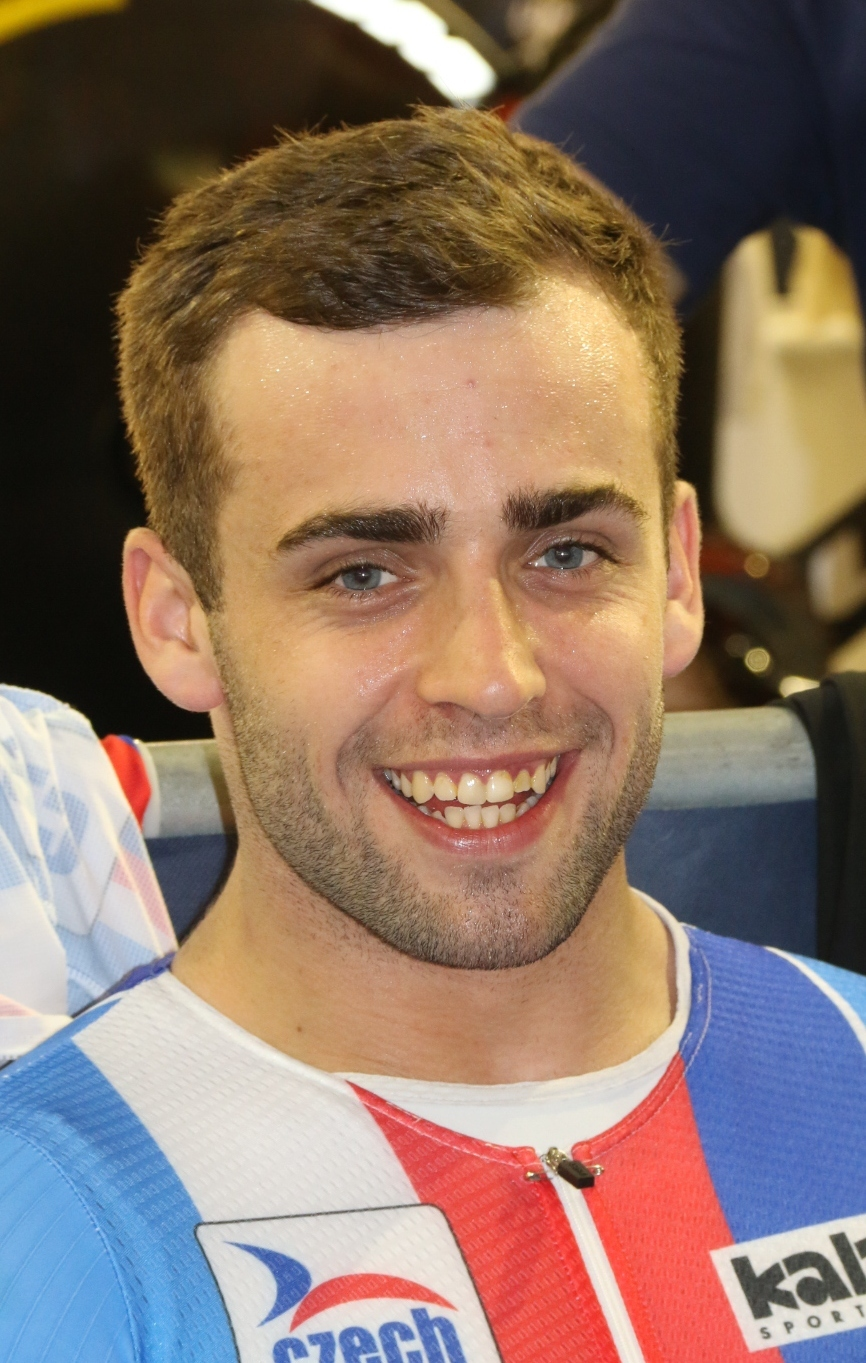
- David Sojka (2017)

Personal information
- Born: 20 March 1994 (age 32)

Cycling career
- Sport: Cycling
- Role: Rider

David Sojka (born 20 March 1994) is a Czech former professional racing cyclist. He rode in the men's 1 km time trial event at the 2017 UCI Track Cycling World Championships.
