= Stefan Ritter =

Canadian track cyclist (born 1998)

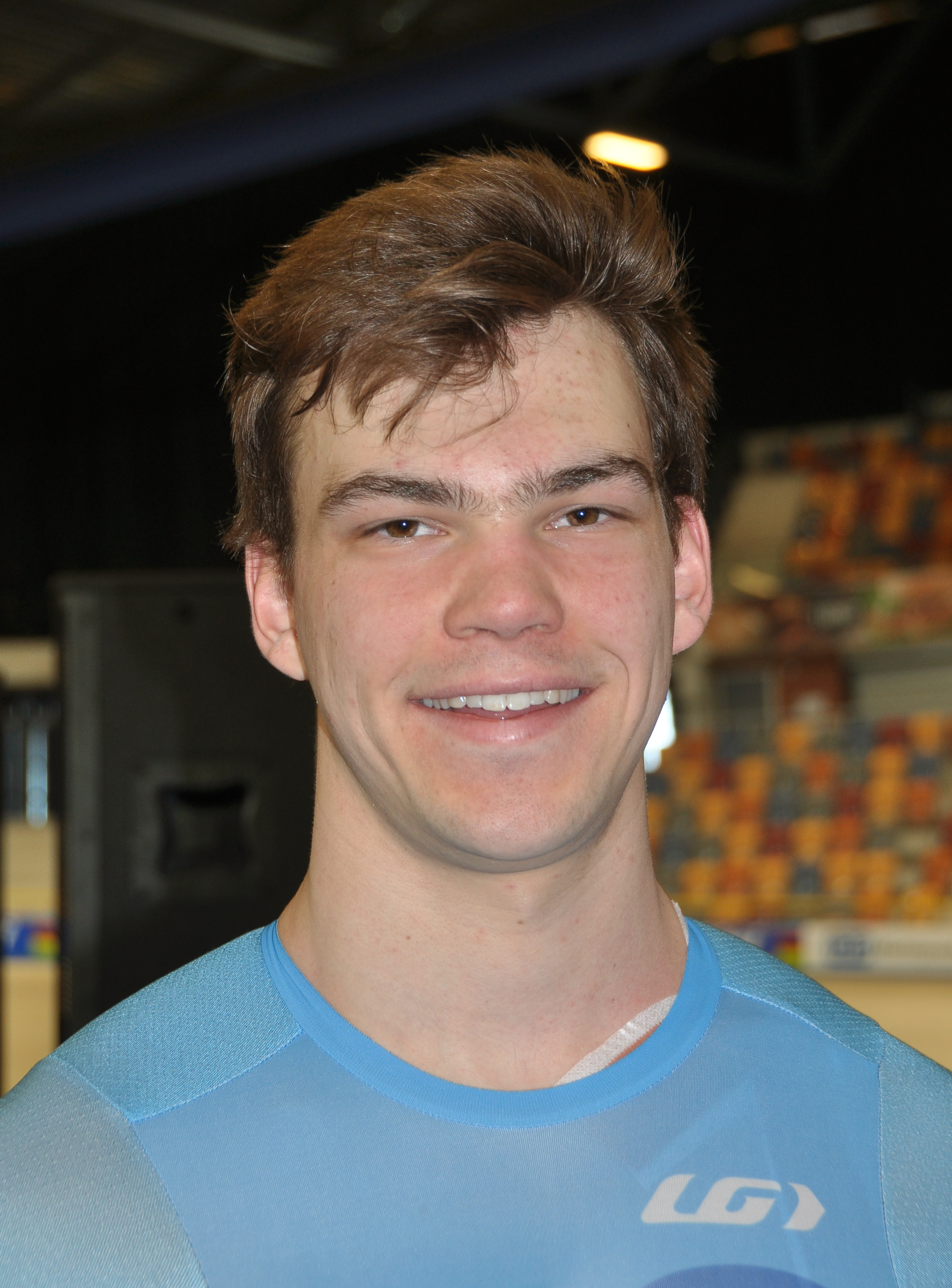
- Stefan Ritter (2018)

Personal information
- Born: 13 May 1998 (age 28) Edmonton, Alberta

Cycling career
- Sport: Cycling
- Discipline: Track cycling
Medal record
Men's track cycling
Representing Canada
Pan American Track Cycling Championships
Bronze medal – third place	2016 Aguascalientes	1 km time trial
Bronze medal – third place	2016 Aguascalientes	Team Sprint

Stefan Ritter (born 13 May 1998) is a Canadian male track cyclist, representing Canada at international competitions. He won the bronze medal at the 2016 Pan American Track Cycling Championships in the 1 km time trial and in the team sprint. Ritter is the 2016 UCI junior world champion in the 1 kilometre time trial.

Ritter suffered a serious head injury during the 2018 Pan American Track Cycling Championships in Mexico and was admitted to the ICU. The medical staff was optimistic that Ritter would make a full recovery.
