= Sam Webster (cyclist) =

New Zealand cyclist (born 1991)

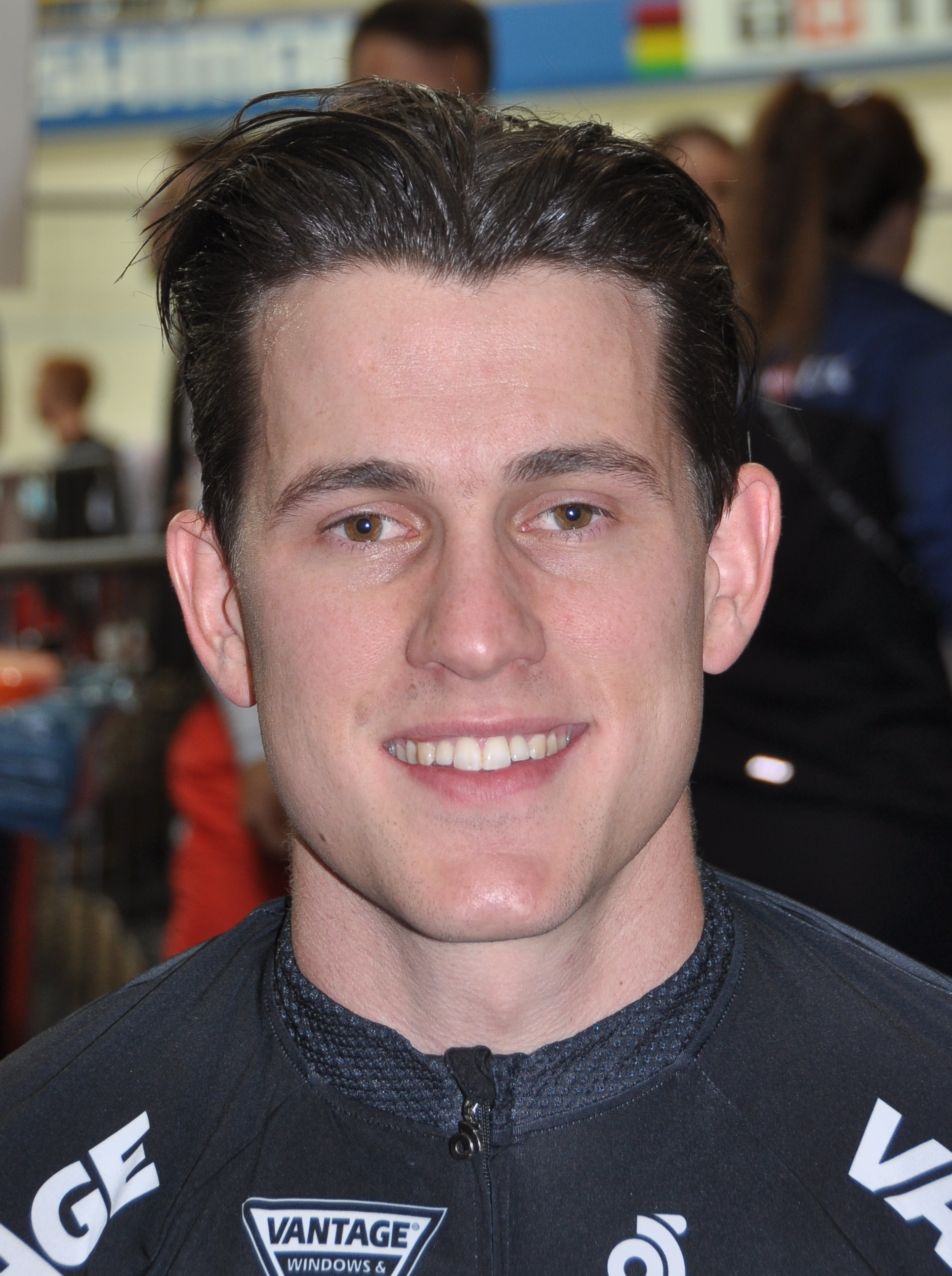

Personal information
- Born: 16 July 1991 (age 35) Auckland, New Zealand
- Height: 1.83 m (6 ft 0 in)
- Weight: 80 kg (176 lb; 12 st 8 lb)

Cycling career
- Sport: Cycling
- Discipline: Track
- Role: Rider
- Rider type: Sprinter

Major wins
- 3× Junior World Champion 2009, 2 gold medals at 2014 glasgow commonwealth games.
Medal record
Olympic Games
Silver medal – second place	2016 Rio de Janeiro	Team sprint
World Championships
Gold medal – first place	2014 Cali	Team sprint
Gold medal – first place	2016 London	Team sprint
Gold medal – first place	2017 Hong Kong	Team sprint
Silver medal – second place	2013 Minsk	Team sprint
Silver medal – second place	2015 Yvelines	Team sprint
Bronze medal – third place	2012 Melbourne	Team sprint
Commonwealth Games
Gold medal – first place	2014 Glasgow	Team sprint
Gold medal – first place	2014 Glasgow	Sprint
Gold medal – first place	2018 Gold Coast	Team sprint
Gold medal – first place	2018 Gold Coast	Sprint
Silver medal – second place	2010 Delhi	Team sprint
Silver medal – second place	2014 Glasgow	Keirin
Bronze medal – third place	2010 Delhi	Sprint
Bronze medal – third place	2022 Birmingham	Team sprint

Sam Webster (born 16 July 1991) is a former New Zealand track cyclist. He was the sprint, keirin and team sprint World Champion at the 2009 Junior World Championships and New Zealand national track cycling champion. He won gold medals at the 2014 Commonwealth Games in the individual sprint and the team sprint.

== Biography ==
Born in Auckland in 1991, Webster attended Auckland Grammar School. Webster is a track cyclist competing in a variety of sprint disciplines. His palmarès include a gold medal at the January 2009 Australian Youth Olympic Festival in the men's sprint. At the Junior World Championship in August 2009 in Moscow, he won gold in the team sprint, Keirin and sprint. From the Junior World Championships, he moved into the elite category. Webster is a member of the New Zealand team sprint team that has made the consistent climb at the World Championships, from Bronze in 2012 (Melbourne), Silver in 2013 (Minsk) and Gold in 2014 (Cali, Colombia), claiming their first World Champions rainbow jersey in the elite ranks.

At the 2010 Commonwealth Games in Delhi, Webster raced his way to Bronze in the sprint and Silver in the team sprint but suffered a big crash in the team sprint in the race for gold. At the 2016 Rio Olympics, he won alongside Eddie Dawkins and Ethan Mitchell a silver medal in the Cycling at the 2016 Summer Olympics – Men's Team Sprint.

At the 2018 Commonwealth Games, Webster won Gold in the team sprint event alongside Ethan Mitchell and Eddie Dawkins.

On 9 November 2022, Webster announced his retirement from cycling.

== Major results ==
2009
1st Sprint, 2009 UCI Juniors Track World Championships
1st Keirin, 2009 UCI Juniors Track World Championships
1st Team Sprint, 2009 UCI Juniors Track World Championships
2nd Keirin, Oceania Cycling Championships
3rd Team sprint, Oceania Cycling Championships

2010
1st Sprintmeeting, Cottbus (August)
1st Sprintmeeting, Dudenhofen (September)
1st Sprintmeeting, Darmstadt (September)
2nd Team Sprint, 2010 Commonwealth Games, Delhi
2nd Team Sprint, UCI World Cup Classics, Melbourne
3rd Team Sprint, UCI World Cup Classics, Cali
3rd Sprint, 2010 Commonwealth Games, Delhi
3rd Keirin, New Zealand National Championships
6th Keirin, UCI Track World Championships, Copenhagen

2012
3rd Team Sprint, UCI Track World Championships, Melbourne

2013
2nd Team Sprint, UCI Track World Championships, Minsk

2014
1st Team Sprint, UCI Track World Championships, Cali
1st Sprint, 2014 Commonwealth Games, Glasgow
1st Team Sprint, 2014 Commonwealth Games, Glasgow

2015
2nd Team Sprint, UCI Track World Championships, Yvelines

2016
1st Team Sprint, UCI Track World Championships, London
2nd Team Sprint, 2016 Summer Olympics, Rio de Janeiro

2017
1st Team Sprint, UCI Track World Championships, Hong Kong

2018
1st Team Sprint, 2018 Commonwealth Games, Gold Coast
1st Sprint, 2018 Commonwealth Games, Gold Coast

== Sponsors ==
- Oakley
- Cycle City

Awards
Preceded by Jossi Wells	Halberg Awards – Emerging Talent Award; 2009	Succeeded by Gareth Kean
