= Ethan Mitchell =

New Zealand cyclist (born 1991)

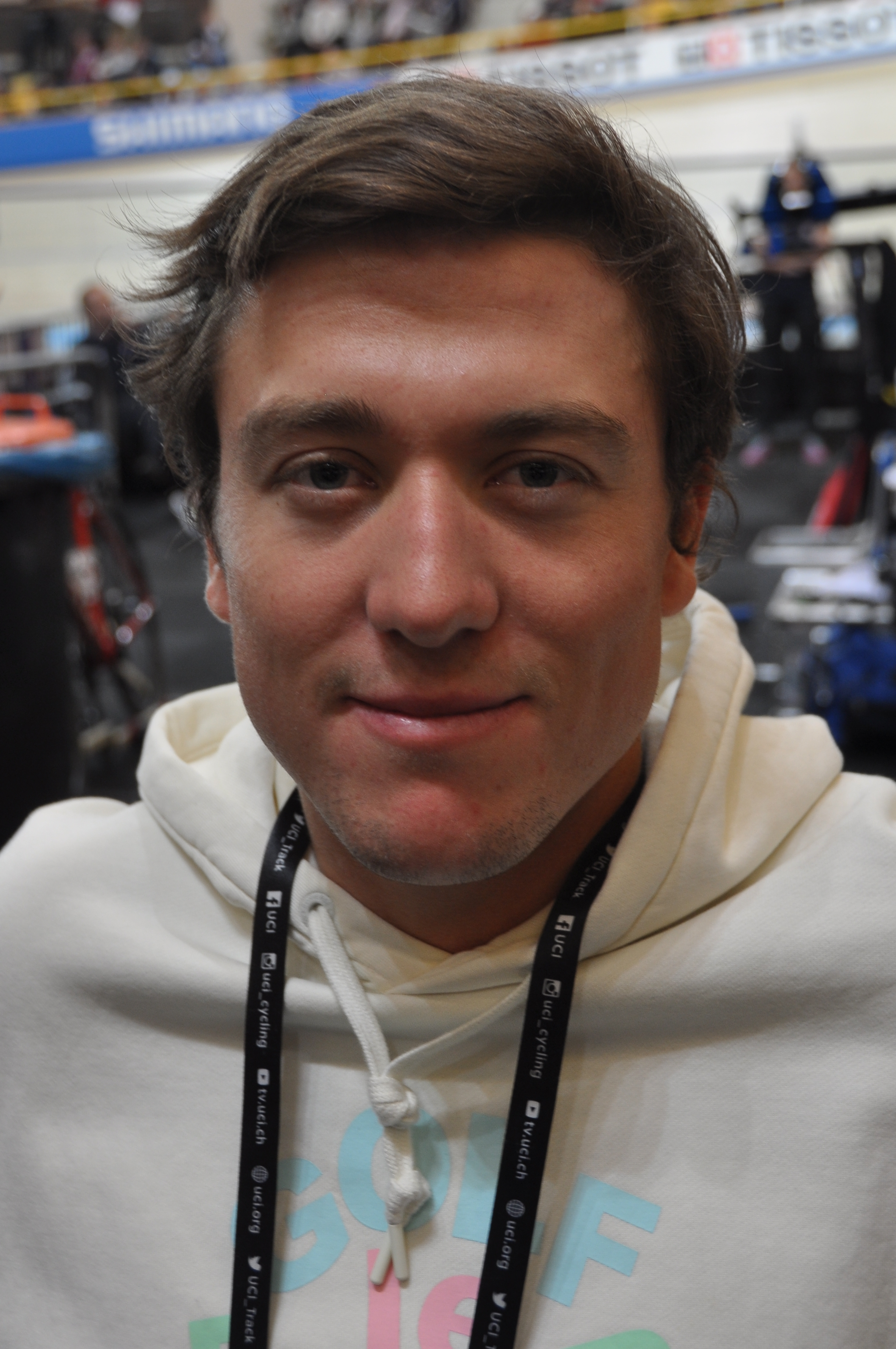
- Ethan Mitchell (2018)

Personal information
- Born: 19 February 1991 (age 35) Auckland, New Zealand
- Height: 1.8 m (5 ft 11 in)
- Weight: 81 kg (179 lb)

Cycling career
- Sport: Cycling
Medal record
Olympic Games
| Silver medal – second place | 2016 Rio de Janeiro | Team sprint |
World Championships
| Gold medal – first place | 2014 Cali | Team sprint |
| Gold medal – first place | 2016 London | Team sprint |
| Gold medal – first place | 2017 Hong Kong | Team sprint |
| Silver medal – second place | 2013 Minsk | Team sprint |
| Silver medal – second place | 2015 Yvelines | Team sprint |
| Bronze medal – third place | 2017 Hong Kong | Sprint |
Commonwealth Games
| Gold medal – first place | 2014 Glasgow | Team sprint |
| Gold medal – first place | 2018 Gold Coast | Team sprint |

Ethan Mitchell (born 19, February 1991) is a former New Zealand track cyclist. He is a multiple-time World Champion, an Olympic medallist, and Commonwealth Champion.

== Career ==
Mitchell has had a successful career in track sprinting after specialising in the 'standing lap' role of first position in the team sprint. A former junior World Champion, Mitchell burst on to the senior scene as a starter at the 2010 Commonwealth Games, winning a silver medal.

At the 2012 Summer Olympics, he competed in the men's team sprint for the national team. That year, he also won a bronze in the men's team sprint at the World Championships, with Sam Webster and Eddie Dawkins. In 2013, the same team won silver at the World Championships.

In 2014, Mitchell, Webster and Dawkins finally won World Championship gold in the men's team sprint. At the 2014 Commonwealth Games in Glasgow, Mitchell won a gold medal in the Men's team sprint and set a Games record with his teammates.

At the 2016 Rio Olympics, he won a silver medal alongside Sam Webster and Eddie Dawkins in the team sprint. That year, the team also regained their World title having been relegated from the competition in 2015. Mitchell won a bronze medal at the 2017 UCI Track Cycling World Championships in Hong Kong in the sprint event; the first New Zealander to win a world championship medal in an individual event. He, Dawkins and Webster also retained the men's team sprint title.

At the 2018 Commonwealth Games, Mitchell won Gold in the team sprint event alongside Sam Webster and Eddie Dawkins.

Mitchell now works at Real Estate Agency Bayleys

== Major results ==
2017
1st Team Sprint, UCI World Track Championships
2nd Sprinters Omnium, Six Day London
