= Eddie Dawkins =

New Zealand cyclist (born 1989)

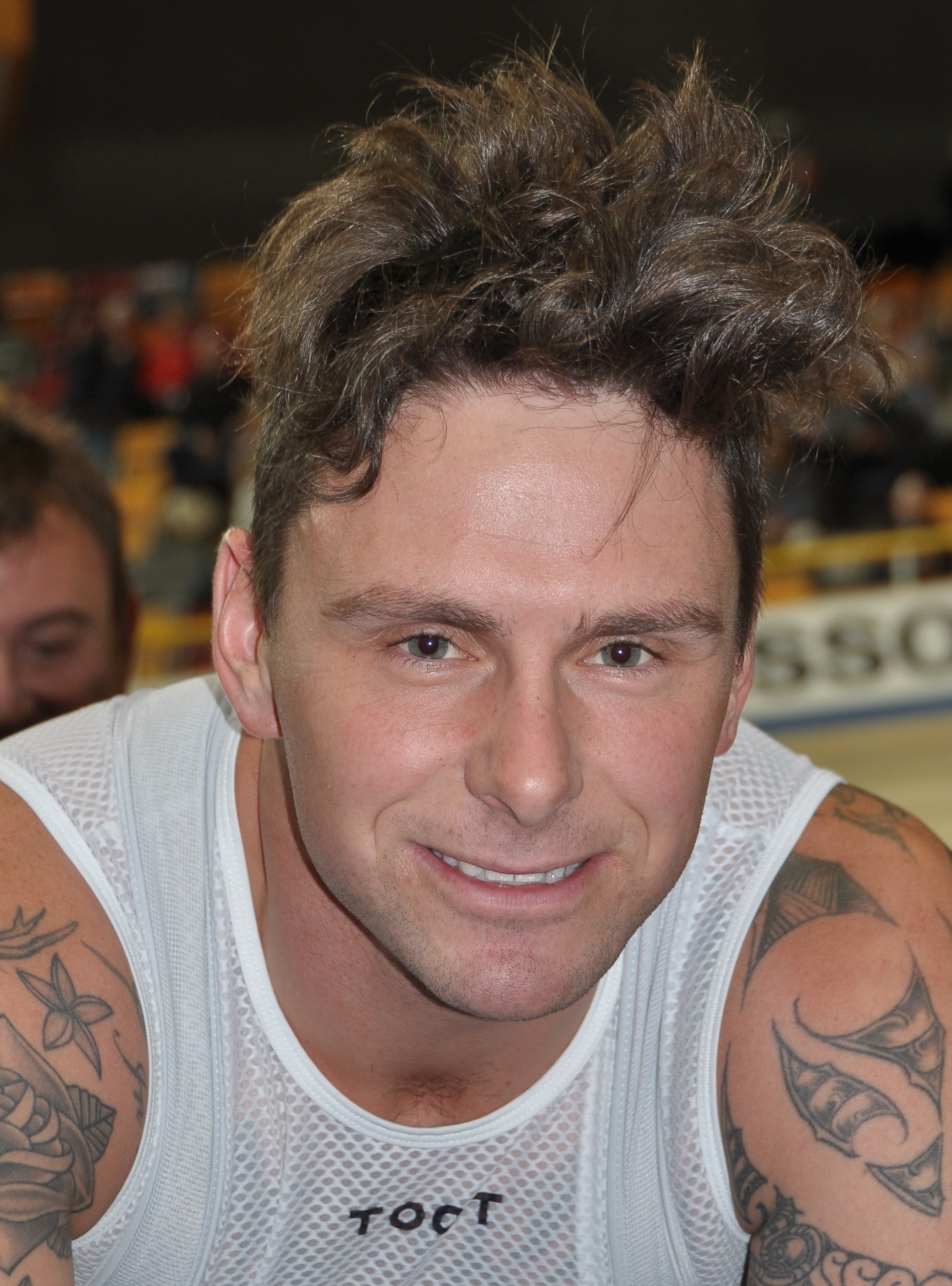
- Eddie Dawkins in 2018

Personal information
- Full name: Edward James Dawkins
- Born: 11 July 1988 (age 38) Invercargill, New Zealand
- Height: 1.85 m (6 ft 1 in)
- Weight: 93 kg (205 lb)

Cycling career
- Sport: Cycling
- Discipline: Track
Medal record
Olympic Games
Silver medal – second place	2016 Rio de Janeiro	Team sprint
World Championships
Gold medal – first place	2014 Cali	Team sprint
Gold medal – first place	2016 London	Team sprint
Gold medal – first place	2017 Hong Kong	Team sprint
Silver medal – second place	2013 Minsk	Team sprint
Silver medal – second place	2015 Yvelines	Team sprint
Silver medal – second place	2015 Yvelines	Keirin
Silver medal – second place	2016 London	Keirin
Commonwealth Games
Gold medal – first place	2014 Glasgow	Team sprint
Gold medal – first place	2018 Gold Coast	Team sprint
Silver medal – second place	2010 Delhi	Team sprint
Silver medal – second place	2018 Gold Coast	1 km time trial
Bronze medal – third place	2010 Delhi	1 km time trial
Bronze medal – third place	2014 Glasgow	Sprint
Bronze medal – third place	2018 Gold Coast	Keirin

Edward James Dawkins (born 11 July 1989) is a New Zealand track cyclist. At the 2010 Commonwealth Games he won the silver medal in the men's sprint and the bronze medal in the men's 1 kilometre time trial. At the 2014 Commonwealth Games, he won the bronze medal in the men's sprint, and was part of the New Zealand team that won the gold medal in the team sprint, with Ethan Mitchell and Sam Webster. The team sprint team set two Commonwealth Games records along the way. At the 2016 Rio Olympics, he won alongside Sam Webster and Ethan Mitchell a silver medal in the team sprint, but did not go beyond the round 1 repechage in the individual sprint.

At the 2018 Commonwealth Games, Dawkins won gold in the team sprint event alongside Ethan Mitchell and Sam Webster.

He had previously competed at the 2012 Summer Olympics.

Dawkins retired from professional cycling in 2020, and took up the sport of powerlifting. In 2022, he was selected to represent New Zealand at the Commonwealth Powerlifting Championships in Auckland.

== Major results ==
2017
1st Team Sprint, UCI World Track Championships
1st Sprinters Omnium, Six Day London

== See also ==
- List of World Championship medalists in men's keirin
