= 2013 UEC European Track Championships – Men's keirin =

Men's keirin at the 2013 UEC European Track Championships
- UEC European Champion jersey
- Venue: Omnisport Apeldoorn, Apeldoorn
- Date: 20 October
- Competitors: 27 from 15 nations

Medalists
gold medal	Maximilian Levy	Germany
silver medal	Jason Kenny	Great Britain
bronze medal	François Pervis	France

The men's keirin was held on 20 October 2013, with 27 riders participating.

== Results ==
=== First round ===
Top 2 in each heat qualified directly for the second round; the remainder went to the first round repechage.

==== Heat 1 ====
Rank	Name	Nation	Notes
1	François Pervis	France	Q
2	Adam Ptáčník	Czech Republic	Q
3	Matthijs Büchli	Netherlands	
4	Uladzislau Novik	Belarus	
5	Rafał Sarnecki	Poland	
6	Jani Mikkonen	Finland	

==== Heat 3 ====
Rank	Name	Nation	Notes
1	Denis Dmitriev	Russia	Q
2	Jason Kenny	Great Britain	Q
3	Francesco Ceci	Italy	
4	Hugo Haak	Netherlands	
5	Andriy Vynokurov	Ukraine	
6	Arūnas Lendel	Lithuania	
7	Artsiom Zaitsau	Belarus	

==== Heat 2 ====
Rank	Name	Nation	Notes
1	Christos Volikakis	Greece	Q
2	Kamil Kuczyński	Poland	Q
3	Stefan Bötticher	Germany	
4	Juan Peralta	Spain	
5	Quentin Lafargue	France	
6	Svajunas Jonauskas	Lithuania	
7	Eoin Mullen	Ireland	

==== Heat 4 ====
Rank	Name	Nation	Notes
1	Maximilian Levy	Germany	Q
2	Pavel Kelemen	Czech Republic	Q
3	Valentin Savitskiy	Russia	
4	Matthew Crampton	Great Britain	
5	Zafeiris Volikakis	Greece	
6	Hodei Mazquiarán Uría	Spain	
7	Gennadii Genus	Ukraine	

=== First Round Repechage ===
Heat winners qualified for the second round.

==== Heat 1 ====
Rank	Name	Nation	Notes
1	Stefan Bötticher	Germany	Q
2	Valentin Savitskiy	Russia	
3	Matthijs Büchli	Netherlands	
4	Francesco Ceci	Italy	

==== Heat 3 ====
Rank	Name	Nation	Notes
1	Quentin Lafargue	France	Q
2	Svajunas Jonauskas	Lithuania	
3	Rafał Sarnecki	Poland	
4	Andriy Vynokurov	Ukraine	
5	Artsiom Zaitsau	Belarus	

==== Heat 2 ====
Rank	Name	Nation	Notes
1	Matthew Crampton	Great Britain	Q
2	Hugo Haak	Netherlands	
3	Juan Peralta	Spain	
4	Uladzislau Novik	Belarus	
5	Gennadii Genus	Ukraine	

==== Heat 4 ====
Rank	Name	Nation	Notes
1	Hodei Mazquiarán Uría	Spain	Q
2	Zafeiris Volikakis	Greece	
3	Arūnas Lendel	Lithuania	
4	Eoin Mullen	Ireland	
5	Jani Mikkonen	Finland	

=== Second round ===
First three riders in each semi qualified for the final; the remainder went to the small final (for places 7-12).

==== Semi-final 1 ====
Rank	Name	Nation	Notes
1	François Pervis	France	Q
2	Maximilian Levy	Germany	Q
3	Quentin Lafargue	France	Q
4	Kamil Kuczyński	Poland	
5	Matthew Crampton	Great Britain	
6	Pavel Kelemen	Czech Republic	

==== Semi-final 2 ====
Rank	Name	Nation	Notes
1	Denis Dmitriev	Russia	Q
2	Jason Kenny	Great Britain	Q
3	Adam Ptáčník	Czech Republic	Q
4	Stefan Bötticher	Germany	
5	Christos Volikakis	Greece	
6	Hodei Mazquiarán Uría	Spain	

=== Finals ===
The final classification is determined in the ranking finals.

==== Final (places 7-12) ====
Rank	Name	Nation	Notes
7	Stefan Bötticher	Germany	
8	Matthew Crampton	Great Britain	
9	Pavel Kelemen	Czech Republic	
10	Christos Volikakis	Greece	
11	Kamil Kuczyński	Poland	
12	Hodei Mazquiarán Uría	Spain	

==== Final (places 1-6) ====
Rank	Name	Nation	Notes
1st place, gold medalist(s)	Maximilian Levy	Germany	
2nd place, silver medalist(s)	Jason Kenny	Great Britain	
3rd place, bronze medalist(s)	François Pervis	France	
4	Adam Ptáčník	Czech Republic	
5	Denis Dmitriev	Russia	
6	Quentin Lafargue	France	
