= 2012 UCI Track Cycling World Championships – Men's sprint =

Men's sprint at the 2012 UCI Track Cycling World Championships
- Venue: Hisense Arena, Melbourne, Australia
- Date: 6–7 April 2012
- Competitors: 53 from 22 nations

Medalists
gold medal	Grégory Baugé	France
silver medal	Jason Kenny	Great Britain
bronze medal	Chris Hoy	Great Britain

Rainbow jersey

The men's sprint at the 2012 UCI Track Cycling World Championships was held on 6–7 April. 53 cyclists participated in the contest.

== Results ==
=== Qualifying ===
The qualifying was held at 13:00.

Rank	Name	Nation	Time	Notes
1	Grégory Baugé	France	9.854	Q
2	Robert Förstemann	Germany	9.873	Q
3	Kévin Sireau	France	9.893	Q
4	Chris Hoy	Great Britain	9.902	Q
5	Matthew Glaetzer	Australia	9.902	Q
6	Jason Kenny	Great Britain	9.953	Q
7	Edward Dawkins	New Zealand	9.963	Q
8	Shane Perkins	Australia	9.965	Q
9	Mickaël Bourgain	France	9.966	Q
10	Stefan Bötticher	Germany	9.983	Q
11	Seiichiro Nakagawa	Japan	10.003	Q
12	Matthew Archilbald	New Zealand	10.034	Q
13	Scott Sunderland	Australia	10.040	Q
14	Zhang Miao	China	10.061	Q
15	Hersony Canelón	Venezuela	10.077	Q
16	René Enders	Germany	10.077	Q
17	Juan Peralta Gascon	Spain	10.101	Q
18	Michael Blatchford	United States	10.118	Q
19	Sam Webster	New Zealand	10.122	Q
20	Kazunari Watanabe	Japan	10.159	Q
21	Ethan Mitchell	New Zealand	10.163	Q
22	Hodei Mazquiarán	Spain	10.163	Q
23	Matthew Crampton	Great Britain	10.167	Q
24	Charlie Conord	France	10.169	Q
25	Nikita Shurshin	Russia	10.178	
26	Damian Zieliński	Poland	10.192	
27	Azizulhasni Awang	Malaysia	10.193	
28	Kazuki Amagai	Japan	10.196	
29	Roy van den Berg	Netherlands	10.203	
30	Denis Dmitriev	Russia	10.209	
31	Yudai Nitta	Japan	10.214	
32	Bernard Esterhuizen	South Africa	10.234	
33	Zhang Lei	China	10.239	
34	Joseph Veloce	Canada	10.281	
35	Kevin Mansker	United States	10.300	
36	Denis Špička	Czech Republic	10.310	
37	Sergey Borisov	Russia	10.311	
38	Fabián Puerta	Colombia	10.334	
39	Matthijs Büchli	Netherlands	10.342	
40	Christos Volikakis	Greece	10.354	
41	Travis Smith	Canada	10.354	
42	Adam Ptáčník	Czech Republic	10.383	
43	Andriy Vynokurov	Ukraine	10.400	
44	Jonathan Marín	Colombia	10.416	
45	Muhammad Md Yunos	Malaysia	10.439	
46	Philip Hindes	Great Britain	10.498	
47	Alexander Quincy	Trinidad and Tobago	10.590	
48	Zafeiris Volikakis	Greece	10.668	
49	César Marcano	Venezuela	10.668	
50	Filip Ditzel	Czech Republic	10.673	
51	Francesco Ceci	Italy	10.775	
52	Omar Bertazzo	Italy	11.384	
53	Bobby Lea	United States	11.496	

=== Finals ===
==== 1/16 finals ====
The 1/16 finals were held at 14:25.

Heat	Rank	Name	Nation	Time	Notes
1	1	Grégory Baugé	France	10.876	Q
1	2	Charlie Conord	France		
2	1	Robert Förstemann	Germany	11.008	Q
2	2	Matthew Crampton	Great Britain		
3	1	Kévin Sireau	France	10.560	Q
3	2	Hodei Mazquiarán	Spain		
4	1	Chris Hoy	Great Britain	11.054	Q
4	2	Ethan Mitchell	New Zealand		
5	1	Matthew Glaetzer	Australia	10.404	Q
5	2	Kazunari Watanabe	Japan		
6	1	Jason Kenny	Great Britain	10.406	Q
6	2	Sam Webster	New Zealand		
7	1	Edward Dawkins	New Zealand	10.632	Q
7	2	Michael Blatchford	United States		
8	1	Shane Perkins	Australia	10.311	Q
8	2	Juan Peralta Gascon	Spain		
9	1	Mickaël Bourgain	France	11.854	Q
9	2	René Enders	Germany		
10	1	Stefan Bötticher	Germany	10.492	Q
10	2	Hersony Canelón	Venezuela		
11	1	Seiichiro Nakagawa	Japan	10.660	Q
11	2	Zhang Miao	China		
12	1	Scott Sunderland	Australia	10.501	Q
12	2	Matthew Archilbald	New Zealand		

==== 1/8 finals ====
The 1/8 finals were held at 16:15.

Heat	Rank	Name	Nation	Time	Notes
1	1	Grégory Baugé	France	10.346	Q
1	2	Scott Sunderland	Australia		
2	1	Robert Förstemann	Germany	10.704	Q
2	2	Seiichiro Nakagawa	Japan		
3	1	Kévin Sireau	France	10.423	Q
3	2	Stefan Bötticher	Germany		
4	1	Mickaël Bourgain	France	10.293	Q
4	2	Chris Hoy	Great Britain		
5	1	Shane Perkins	Australia	10.357	Q
5	2	Matthew Glaetzer	Australia		
6	1	Jason Kenny	Great Britain	10.548	Q
6	2	Edward Dawkins	New Zealand		

==== Repechage ====
The 1/8 finals repechages were held at 17:10.

Heat	Rank	Name	Nation	Time	Notes
1	1	Chris Hoy	Great Britain	10.579	Q
1	2	Scott Sunderland	Australia		
1	3	Edward Dawkins	New Zealand		
2	1	Stefan Bötticher	Germany	10.694	Q
2	2	Matthew Glaetzer	Australia		REL
2	3	Seiichiro Nakagawa	Japan		DNF

==== Quarterfinals ====
The quarterfinals were held at 19:10, 20:20 and 21:25.

Heat	Rank	Name	Nation	Race 1	Race 2	Decider	Notes
1	1	Grégory Baugé	France	10.561	10.460		Q
1	2	Stefan Bötticher	Germany				
2	1	Chris Hoy	Great Britain	10.281		10.401	Q
2	2	Robert Förstemann	Germany		10.350		
3	1	Jason Kenny	Great Britain	10.331		10.597	Q
3	2	Kévin Sireau	France		10.228		
4	1	Shane Perkins	Australia	10.251		10.464	Q
4	2	Mickaël Bourgain	France		10.458	REL	

==== Race 5th–8th place ====
The race for 5th–8th place was held at 21:30.

Rank	Name	Nation	Time
5	Robert Förstemann	Germany	10.409
6	Stefan Bötticher	Germany	
7	Kévin Sireau	France	
–	Mickaël Bourgain	France	DSQ

==== Semifinals ====
The semifinals were held at 19:00 and 19:40.

Heat	Rank	Name	Nation	Race 1	Race 2	Decider	Notes
1	1	Grégory Baugé	France	10.416	10.189		Q
1	2	Shane Perkins	Australia				
2	1	Jason Kenny	Great Britain	10.441	10.403		Q
2	2	Chris Hoy	Great Britain				

==== Small final ====
The finals were held at 21:10 and 22:20.

Rank	Name	Nation	Race 1	Race 2	Decider	Notes
3rd place, bronze medalist(s)	Chris Hoy	Great Britain	10.573	10.348		
4	Shane Perkins	Australia				

==== Final ====
Rank	Name	Nation	Race 1	Race 2	Decider	Notes
1st place, gold medalist(s)	Grégory Baugé	France	10.493	11.627		
2nd place, silver medalist(s)	Jason Kenny	Great Britain		REL		
