= 2010 European Track Championships – Men's sprint =

UEC European Champion jersey

The Men's sprint was one of the 6 men's events at the 2010 European Track Championships, held in Pruszków, Poland.

28 cyclists participated in the contest.

The event was held on November 6.

== World record ==
World Record
WR	9.572	Kévin Sireau (FRA)	(Russia) Moscow	30 May 2009

== Qualifying ==
Fastest 24 riders advanced to 1/16 finals.

Rank	Name	Nation	Time	Notes
1	Chris Hoy	Great Britain	9.999	Q
2	Kévin Sireau	France	10.097	Q
3	Roy van den Berg	Netherlands	10.113	Q
4	Damian Zieliński	Poland	10.210	Q
5	Michaël D'Almeida	France	10.221	Q
6	Jason Kenny	Great Britain	10.236	Q
7	Robert Förstemann	Germany	10.253	Q
8	Tomáš Bábek	Czech Republic	10.353	Q
9	Denis Špička	Czech Republic	10.355	Q
10	Carsten Bergemann	Germany	10.381	Q
11	Zafeiris Volikakis	Greece	10.404	Q
11	Denis Dmitriev	Russia	10.404	Q
13	Andriy Vynokurov	Ukraine	10.441	Q
14	Adrian Tekliński	Poland	10.445	Q
15	David Alonso	Spain	10.567	Q
16	Pavel Yakushevskiy	Russia	10.580	Q
17	Luca Ceci	Italy	10.633	Q
18	Juan Peralta	Spain	10.635	Q
19	Hugo Haak	Netherlands	10.690	Q
20	Artem Frolov	Ukraine	10.750	Q
21	Francesco Ceci	Italy	10.765	Q
22	Gediminas Petrauskas	Lithuania	10.771	Q
23	Clemens Selzer	Austria	10.879	Q
24	Felix English	Ireland	11.046	Q
25	Daniel Baldauf	Austria	11.110	
26	Miroslav Minchev	Bulgaria	11.148	
27	David Askurava	Georgia	11.217	
28	Miroslav Denev	Bulgaria	11.886	

=== 1/16 Finals ===
Winner of each heat qualified to 1/8 Finals. Chris Hoy, fastest cyclist of the qualifying, lost against Felix English who entered the 1/8 finals with the slowest time.

Heat	Rank	Name	Nation	Time	Notes
1	1	Felix English	Ireland	11.752	Q
1	2	Chris Hoy	Great Britain		
2	1	Kévin Sireau	France	11.034	Q
2	2	Clemens Selzer	Austria		
3	1	Roy van den Berg	Netherlands	10.818	Q
3	2	Gediminas Petrauskas	Lithuania		
4	1	Damian Zieliński	Poland	10.918	Q
4	2	Francesco Ceci	Italy		
5	1	Michaël D'Almeida	France	10.669	Q
5	2	Artem Frolov	Ukraine		
6	1	Jason Kenny	Great Britain	10.672	Q
6	2	Hugo Haak	Netherlands		
7	1	Robert Förstemann	Germany	10.917	Q
7	2	Juan Peralta	Spain		
8	1	Tomáš Bábek	Czech Republic	10.902	Q
8	2	Luca Ceci	Italy		
9	1	Denis Špička	Czech Republic	11.122	Q
9	2	Pavel Yakushevskiy	Russia		
10	1	Carsten Bergemann	Germany	11.199	Q
10	2	David Castillo	Spain		
11	1	Zafeiris Volikakis	Greece	11.035	Q
11	2	Adrian Tekliński	Poland		
12	1	Denis Dmitriev	Russia	10.899	Q
12	2	Andriy Vynokurov	Ukraine		

=== 1/8 Finals ===
Winner of each heat qualified to 1/4 Finals. Losers went to repêchages.

Heat	Rank	Name	Nation	Time	Notes
1	1	Denis Dmitriev	Russia	11.024	Q
1	2	Felix English	Ireland		
2	1	Kévin Sireau	France	10.472	Q
2	2	Zafeiris Volikakis	Greece		
3	1	Roy van den Berg	Netherlands	10.986	Q
3	2	Carsten Bergemann	Germany		
4	1	Damian Zieliński	Poland	10.589	Q
4	2	Denis Špička	Czech Republic		
5	1	Michaël D'Almeida	France	10.757	Q
5	2	Tomáš Bábek	Czech Republic		
6	1	Jason Kenny	Great Britain	10.482	Q
6	2	Robert Förstemann	Germany		

=== 1/8 Finals Repechage ===
Heat	Rank	Name	Nation	Time	Notes
1	1	Denis Špička	Czech Republic	10.973	Q
1	2	Felix English	Ireland		
1	3	Robert Förstemann	Germany		REL
2	1	Tomáš Bábek	Czech Republic	10.911	Q
2	2	Carsten Bergemann	Germany		
2	3	Zafeiris Volikakis	Greece		

=== Quarterfinals ===
Heat	Rank	Name	Nation	Race 1	Race 2	Decider	Notes
1	1	Denis Dmitriev	Russia	10.639	10.787		Q
1	2	Tomáš Bábek	Czech Republic				
2	1	Kévin Sireau	France	10.667	10.650		Q
2	2	Denis Špička	Czech Republic				
3	1	Jason Kenny	Great Britain	10.448	10.578		Q
3	2	Roy van den Berg	Netherlands				
4	1	Damian Zieliński	Poland		10.743	10.546	Q
4	2	Michaël D'Almeida	France	10.631			

=== Race for 5th-8th Places ===
Rank	Name	Nation	Time
5	Tomáš Bábek	Czech Republic	12.088
6	Denis Špička	Czech Republic	
7	Michaël D'Almeida	France	
8	Roy van den Berg	Netherlands	

=== Semifinals ===
Heat	Rank	Name	Nation	Race 1	Race 2	Decider	Notes
1	1	Denis Dmitriev	Russia		10.502		Q
1	2	Damian Zieliński	Poland	10.851			DSQ
2	1	Kévin Sireau	France	10.401	10.445		Q
2	2	Jason Kenny	Great Britain				

=== Finals ===
Rank	Name	Nation	Race 1	Race 2	Decider
Gold Medal Races
1st place, gold medalist(s)	Denis Dmitriev	Russia	10.418	10.657	
2nd place, silver medalist(s)	Kévin Sireau	France			
Bronze Medal Races
3rd place, bronze medalist(s)	Jason Kenny	Great Britain			
4	Damian Zieliński	Poland	DSQ		
