= 2010 UCI Track Cycling World Championships – Men's team sprint =

Rainbow jersey

The Men's Team Sprint is one of the 10 men's events at the 2010 UCI Track Cycling World Championships, held in Ballerup, Denmark.

Sixteen teams of 3 cyclists each participated in the contest. After the qualifying, the fastest 2 teams raced for gold, and 3rd and 4th teams raced for bronze.

The Qualifying and the Finals were held on the evening session on March 24.

== Qualifying ==
Rank	Name	Nation	Time	Notes
1	Grégory Baugé; Michaël D'Almeida; Kévin Sireau	France	43.373	Q
2	Robert Förstemann; Maximilian Levy; Stefan Nimke	Germany	43.458	Q
3	Ross Edgar; Chris Hoy; Jason Kenny	Great Britain	43.802	Q
4	Cheng Changsong; Zhang Lei; Zhang Miao	China	44.017	Q
5	Edward Dawkins; Adam Stewart; Sam Webster	New Zealand	44.450	
6	Sergey Borisov; Denis Dmitriev; Sergey Kucherov	Russia	44.498	
7	Dan Ellis; Jason Niblett; Scott Sunderland	Australia	44.630	
8	Teun Mulder; Yondi Schmidt; Roy van den Berg	Netherlands	44.630	
9	Maciej Bielecki; Kamil Kuczyński; Damian Zieliński	Poland	44.820	
10	Kota Asai; Yudai Nitta; Kazunari Watanabe	Japan	45.136	
11	Stephane Cossette; Travis Smith; Joseph Veloce	Canada	45.523	
12	Tomáš Bábek; Adam Ptáčník; Denis Špička	Czech Republic	45.674	
13	Vasileios Reppas; Christos Volikakis; Zafeirios Volikakis	Greece	45.730	
14	Danylo Dutkevych; Artem Frolov; Andriy Vynokurov	Ukraine	45.795	
15	David Alonso Castillo; Itmar Esteban Herraiz; Alfredo Moreno Cano	Spain	46.071	
16	Valerio Catellini; Francesco Ceci; Luca Ceci	Italy	46.436	

== Finals ==
Rank	Name	Nation	Time
Gold Medal Race
1st place, gold medalist(s)	Robert Förstemann; Maximilian Levy; Stefan Nimke	Germany	43.433
2nd place, silver medalist(s)	Grégory Baugé; Michaël D'Almeida; Kévin Sireau	France	43.453
Bronze Medal Race
3rd place, bronze medalist(s)	Ross Edgar; Chris Hoy; Jason Kenny	Great Britain	43.590
4	Cheng Changsong; Zhang Lei; Zhang Miao	China	44.002
