= 2010 European Track Championships – Men's team sprint =

UEC European Champion jersey

The men's team sprint was one of the six men's events at the 2010 European Track Championships, held in Pruszków, Poland.

Eleven teams of two cyclists each participated in the contest. After the qualifying, the fastest two teams raced for gold, and the 3rd and 4th teams raced for bronze.

The qualifying and the finals were held on 5 November.

== World record ==
World record
WR	42.950	Great Britain	(China) Beijing	15 March 2008

== Qualifying ==
The fastest two teams raced for gold and 3rd and 4th teams raced for bronze.

Rank	Name	Nation	Time	Notes
1	Robert Förstemann; Maximilian Levy; Stefan Nimke	Germany	43.968	Q
2	Michaël D'Almeida; François Pervis; Kévin Sireau	France	44.102	Q
3	Matthew Crampton; Chris Hoy; Jason Kenny	Great Britain	44.149	q
4	Maciej Bielecki; Kamil Kuczyński; Damian Zieliński	Poland	44.428	q
5	Sergey Borisov; Denis Dmitriev; Sergey Kucherov	Russia	44.918	
6	Hugo Haak; Teun Mulder; Roy van den Berg	Netherlands	45.254	
7	Tomáš Bábek; Martin Feiferlík; Denis Špička	Czech Republic	45.415	
8	David Alonso; Itmar Esteban; Juan Peralta	Spain	46.256	
9	Valerio Catellini; Luca Ceci; Francesco Ceci	Italy	46.517	
10	Artem Frolov; Sergiy Omelchenko; Andriy Vynokurov	Ukraine	46.715	
11	Daniel Baldauf; Clemens Selzer; Georg Tazreiter	Austria	48.450	

== Finals ==
Rank	Name	Nation	Time
Gold medal race
1st place, gold medalist(s)	Robert Förstemann; Maximilian Levy; Stefan Nimke	Germany	44.066
2nd place, silver medalist(s)	Michaël D'Almeida; François Pervis; Kévin Sireau	France	44.281
Bronze medal race
3rd place, bronze medalist(s)	Matthew Crampton; Chris Hoy; Jason Kenny	Great Britain	43.968
4	Maciej Bielecki; Kamil Kuczyński; Damian Zieliński	Poland	44.495
