= 2008 UCI Track Cycling World Championships – Men's keirin =

World Championships (2008 UCI Track Cycling World)

Men's keirin at the 2008 UCI Track Cycling World Championships
- Venue: Manchester Velodrome, Manchester
- Date: 29 March 2008

The Men's keirin event of the 2008 UCI Track Cycling World Championships was held on 29 March 2008.

== Results ==
=== Round 1 ===
Heat	Rank	Name	Nation	Note
1	1	Chris Hoy	United Kingdom	Q
	2	Toshiaki Fushimi	Japan	Q
	3	Teun Mulder	Netherlands	
	4	Sergey Ruban	Russia	
	5	Andriy Vynokurov	Ukraine	
	6	Hodei Mazquiarán Uría	Spain	
	7	Athanasios Mantzouranis	Greece	
2	1	Azizulhasni Awang	Malaysia	Q
	2	Shane Perkins	Australia	Q
	3	Arnaud Tournant	France	
	4	Theo Bos	Netherlands	
	5	Ricardo Lynch	Jamaica	
	6	Sergey Borisov	Russia	
	7	Adam Ptáčník	Czech Republic	
3	1	Ross Edgar	United Kingdom	Q
	2	Shane John Kelly	Australia	Q
	3	Carsten Bergemann	Germany	
	4	Kévin Sireau	France	
	5	Denis Špička	Czech Republic	
	6	Roberto Chiappa	Italy	
	7	Mohd Rizal Tisin	Malaysia	
4	1	Christos Volikakis	Greece	Q
	2	Matthew Crampton	United Kingdom	Q
	3	Ryan Bayley	Australia	
	4	Josiah Ng Onn Lam	Malaysia	
	5	José Antonio Escuredo	Spain	
	6	Stefan Nimke	Germany	

=== Round 1 repechage ===
Heat	Rank	Name	Nation	Note
1	1	Teun Mulder	Netherlands	Q
	2	Sergey Borisov	Russia	
	3	Josiah Ng Onn Lam	Malaysia	
	4	Denis Špička	Czech Republic	
2	1	Arnaud Tournant	France	Q
	2	Ricardo Lynch	Jamaica	
	3	Athanasios Mantzouranis	Greece	
	4	Kévin Sireau	France	
	5	Hodei Mazquiarán Uría	Spain	
3	1	Carsten Bergemann	Germany	Q
	2	Theo Bos	Netherlands	
	3	Andriy Vynokurov	Ukraine	
	4	Stefan Nimke	Germany	
	5	Mohd Rizal Tisin	Malaysia	
4	1	Ryan Bayley	Australia	Q
	2	Adam Ptáčník	Czech Republic	
	3	José Antonio Escuredo	Spain	
	4	Roberto Chiappa	Italy	
	5	Sergey Ruban	Russia	

=== Round 2 ===
Heat	Rank	Name	Nation	Note
1	1	Chris Hoy	United Kingdom	Q
	2	Christos Volikakis	Greece	Q
	3	Teun Mulder	Netherlands	Q
	4	Shane John Kelly	Australia	
	5	Shane Perkins	Australia	
	6	Ryan Bayley	Australia	
2	1	Matthew Crampton	United Kingdom	Q
	2	Arnaud Tournant	France	Q
	3	Toshiaki Fushimi	Japan	Q
	4	Ross Edgar	United Kingdom	
	5	Carsten Bergemann	Germany	
	6	Azizulhasni Awang	Malaysia	

=== Finals ===
Rank	Name	Nation
Gold medal race
1st place, gold medalist(s)	Chris Hoy	United Kingdom
2nd place, silver medalist(s)	Christos Volikakis	Greece
3rd place, bronze medalist(s)	Teun Mulder	Netherlands
4	Shane John Kelly	Australia
5	Shane Perkins	Australia
6	Ryan Bayley	Australia
Race for 7th-12th places
7	Matthew Crampton	United Kingdom
8	Arnaud Tournant	France
9	Toshiaki Fushimi	Japan
10	Ross Edgar	United Kingdom
11	Carsten Bergemann	Germany
12	Azizulhasni Awang	Malaysia
