= 2012 UCI Track Cycling World Championships – Men's keirin =

Rainbow jersey

The men's keirin at the 2012 UCI Track Cycling World Championships was held on 8 April. 33 athletes participated in the contest. After the six qualifying heats, the fastest rider in each heat advanced to the second round. The riders that did not advance to the second round, raced in six repechage heats. The first rider in each heat advanced to the second round along with the eight that qualified before.

The first three riders from each of the two second round heats advanced to the final and the remaining riders raced a consolation 7–12 final.

== Medalists ==
Gold	Chris Hoy (GBR)
Silver	Maximilian Levy (GER)
Bronze	Jason Kenny (GBR)

== Results ==
=== First round ===
The heats were held at 14:30.

==== Heat 1 ====
Rank	Name	Nation	Notes
1	Yudai Nitta	Japan	Q
2	Josiah Ng	Malaysia	
3	Zhang Miao	China	
4	Shane Perkins	Australia	
5	Sergey Borisov	Russia	

==== Heat 2 ====
Rank	Name	Nation	Notes
1	Chris Hoy	Great Britain	Q
2	Hersony Canelón	Venezuela	
3	Joachim Eilers	Germany	
4	Francesco Ceci	Italy	
5	Kamil Kuczyński	Poland	

==== Heat 3 ====
Rank	Name	Nation	Notes
1	Hodei Mazquiaran Uria	Spain	Q
2	Simon Van Velthooven	New Zealand	
3	Teun Mulder	Netherlands	
4	Maximilian Levy	Germany	
5	Denis Špička	Czech Republic	

==== Heat 4 ====
Rank	Name	Nation	Notes
1	Azizulhasni Awang	Malaysia	Q
2	Matthew Crampton	Great Britain	
3	Alexander Quincy	Trinidad and Tobago	
4	Juan Peralta Gascon	Spain	
5	Fabián Puerta	Colombia	
–	Matthew Glaetzer	Australia	DNF

==== Heat 5 ====
Rank	Name	Nation	Notes
1	Kazunari Watanabe	Japan	Q
2	Jason Kenny	Great Britain	
3	Christos Volikakis	Greece	
4	Mickaël Bourgain	France	
5	Edward Dawkins	New Zealand	
6	Andriy Vynokurov	Ukraine	

==== Heat 6 ====
Rank	Name	Nation	Notes
1	Scott Sunderland	Australia	Q
2	François Pervis	France	
3	Matthew Archibald	New Zealand	
4	Jonathan Marín	Colombia	
5	Muhammad Md Yunos	Malaysia	
6	Hugo Haak	Netherlands	

=== First round repechage ===
The heats were held at 16:05.

==== Heat 1 ====
Rank	Name	Nation	Notes
1	Mickaël Bourgain	France	Q
2	Fabián Puerta	Colombia	
3	Josiah Ng	Malaysia	
4	Matthew Archibald	New Zealand	

==== Heat 2 ====
Rank	Name	Nation	Notes
1	Hersony Canelón	Venezuela	Q
2	Christos Volikakis	Greece	
3	Denis Špička	Czech Republic	
4	Juan Peralta Gascon	Spain	

==== Heat 3 ====
Rank	Name	Nation	Notes
1	Simon Van Velthooven	New Zealand	Q
2	Jonathan Marín	Colombia	
3	Kamil Kuczyński	Poland	
4	Alexander Quincy	Trinidad and Tobago	

==== Heat 4 ====
Rank	Name	Nation	Notes
1	Matthew Crampton	Great Britain	Q
2	Francesco Ceci	Italy	
3	Teun Mulder	Netherlands	
4	Andriy Vynokurov	Ukraine	
5	Sergey Borisov	Russia	

==== Heat 5 ====
Rank	Name	Nation	Notes
1	Jason Kenny	Great Britain	Q
2	Matthew Glaetzer	Australia	
3	Shane Perkins	Australia	
4	Joachim Eilers	Germany	
5	Muhammad Md Yunos	Malaysia	

==== Heat 6 ====
Rank	Name	Nation	Notes
1	Maximilian Levy	Germany	Q
2	Edward Dawkins	New Zealand	
3	François Pervis	France	
4	Zhang Miao	China	
5	Hugo Haak	Netherlands	

=== Second round ===
The heats were held at 19:15.

==== Heat 1 ====
Rank	Name	Nation	Notes
1	Maximilian Levy	Germany	Q
2	Kazunari Watanabe	Japan	Q
3	Simon Van Velthooven	New Zealand	Q
4	Yudai Nitta	Japan	
5	Azizulhasni Awang	Malaysia	
6	Hersony Canelón	Venezuela	

==== Heat 2 ====
Rank	Name	Nation	Notes
1	Chris Hoy	Great Britain	Q
2	Mickaël Bourgain	France	Q
3	Jason Kenny	Great Britain	Q
4	Scott Sunderland	Australia	
5	Matthew Crampton	Great Britain	
6	Hodei Mazquiaran Uria	Spain	

=== Finals ===
The finals were held at 20:45.

==== Small final ====
Rank	Name	Nation	Notes
7	Scott Sunderland	Australia	
8	Hersony Canelón	Venezuela	
9	Azizulhasni Awang	Malaysia	
10	Matthew Crampton	Great Britain	
11	Hodei Mazquiaran Uria	Spain	
12	Yudai Nitta	Japan	

==== Final ====
Rank	Name	Nation	Notes
1st place, gold medalist(s)	Chris Hoy	Great Britain	
2nd place, silver medalist(s)	Maximilian Levy	Germany	
3rd place, bronze medalist(s)	Jason Kenny	Great Britain	
4	Mickaël Bourgain	France	
5	Kazunari Watanabe	Japan	
–	Simon Van Velthooven	New Zealand	REL
