= 2010 European Track Championships – Men's keirin =

UEC European Champion jersey

The Men's keirin was one of the 6 men's events at the 2010 European Track Championships, held in Pruszków, Poland.

27 cyclists participated in the contest.

The event was held on November 7.

== First round ==
First 2 riders in each heat qualified for the second round, remainder to first round repechage.

=== Heat 1 ===
Rank	Name	Nation	Notes
1	Maximilian Levy	Germany	Q
2	Michael D'Almeida	France	Q
3	Francesco Ceci	Italy	
4	Gediminas Petrauskas	Lithuania	
5	Kamil Kuczyński	Poland	
6	Andriy Vynokurov	Ukraine	
7	Georg Tazreiter	Austria	

=== Heat 2 ===
Rank	Name	Nation	Notes
1	Matthew Crampton	Great Britain	Q
2	Adrian Tekliński	Poland	Q
3	Zafeiris Volikakis	Greece	
4	Teun Mulder	Netherlands	
5	Valentin Savitskiy	Russia	
6	Miroslav Denev	Bulgaria	
7	Adam Ptáčník	Czech Republic	REL

=== Heat 3 ===
Rank	Name	Nation	Notes
1	François Pervis	France	Q
2	Luca Ceci	Italy	Q
3	Pavel Yakushevskiy	Russia	
4	Itmar Esteban	Spain	
5	Daniel Baldauf	Austria	
6	David Askurava	Georgia	
7	Sergiy Omelchenko	Ukraine	

=== Heat 4 ===
Rank	Name	Nation	Notes
1	Jason Kenny	Great Britain	Q
2	Hugo Haak	Netherlands	Q
3	Juan Peralta	Spain	
4	Michael Seidenbacher	Germany	
5	Miroslav Minchev	Bulgaria	
6	Denis Špička	Czech Republic	REL

== First Round Repechage ==
First rider in each heat qualified for the second round.

=== Heat 1 ===
Rank	Name	Nation	Notes
1	Michael Seidenbacher	Germany	Q
2	Francesco Ceci	Italy	
3	Georg Tazreiter	Austria	
4	Miroslav Denev	Bulgaria	
5	Daniel Baldauf	Austria	

=== Heat 2 ===
Rank	Name	Nation	Notes
1	Valentin Savitskiy	Russia	Q
2	Andriy Vynokurov	Ukraine	
3	Zafeiris Volikakis	Greece	
4	Itmar Esteban	Spain	

=== Heat 3 ===
Rank	Name	Nation	Notes
1	Kamil Kuczyński	Poland	Q
2	Denis Špička	Czech Republic	
3	Pavel Yakushevskiy	Russia	
4	Sergiy Omelchenko	Ukraine	
5	Teun Mulder	Netherlands	REL

=== Heat 4 ===
Rank	Name	Nation	Notes
1	Adam Ptáčník	Czech Republic	Q
2	Juan Peralta	Spain	
3	Gediminas Petrauskas	Lithuania	
4	David Askurava	Georgia	
5	Miroslav Minchev	Bulgaria	

== Second round ==
First 3 riders in each heat qualified for the final 1- 6 and the others to final 7 – 12.

=== Heat 1 ===
Rank	Name	Nation	Notes
1	Jason Kenny	Great Britain	Q
2	Adam Ptáčník	Czech Republic	Q
3	Adrian Tekliński	Poland	Q
4	Luca Ceci	Italy	
–	Maximilian Levy	Germany	DNF
–	Michael Seidenbacher	Germany	DNF

=== Heat 2 ===
Rank	Name	Nation	Notes
1	Matthew Crampton	Great Britain	Q
2	François Pervis	France	Q
3	Michael D'Almeida	France	Q
4	Kamil Kuczyński	Poland	
5	Valentin Savitskiy	Russia	
6	Hugo Haak	Netherlands	

== Finals ==
=== Final 7-12 places ===
Rank	Name	Nation	Notes
7	Kamil Kuczyński	Poland	
8	Valentin Savitskiy	Russia	
9	Luca Ceci	Italy	
10	Hugo Haak	Netherlands	
11	Michael Seidenbacher	Germany	
–	Maximilian Levy	Germany	DNS

=== Final ===
Rank	Name	Nation	Notes
1st place, gold medalist(s)	Jason Kenny	Great Britain	
2nd place, silver medalist(s)	Matthew Crampton	Great Britain	
3rd place, bronze medalist(s)	Adam Ptáčník	Czech Republic	
4	Michael D'Almeida	France	
5	François Pervis	France	
6	Adrian Tekliński	Poland	
