= Cycling at the 2012 Summer Olympics – Men's sprint =

Men's cycling sprint at the Games of the XXX Olympiad
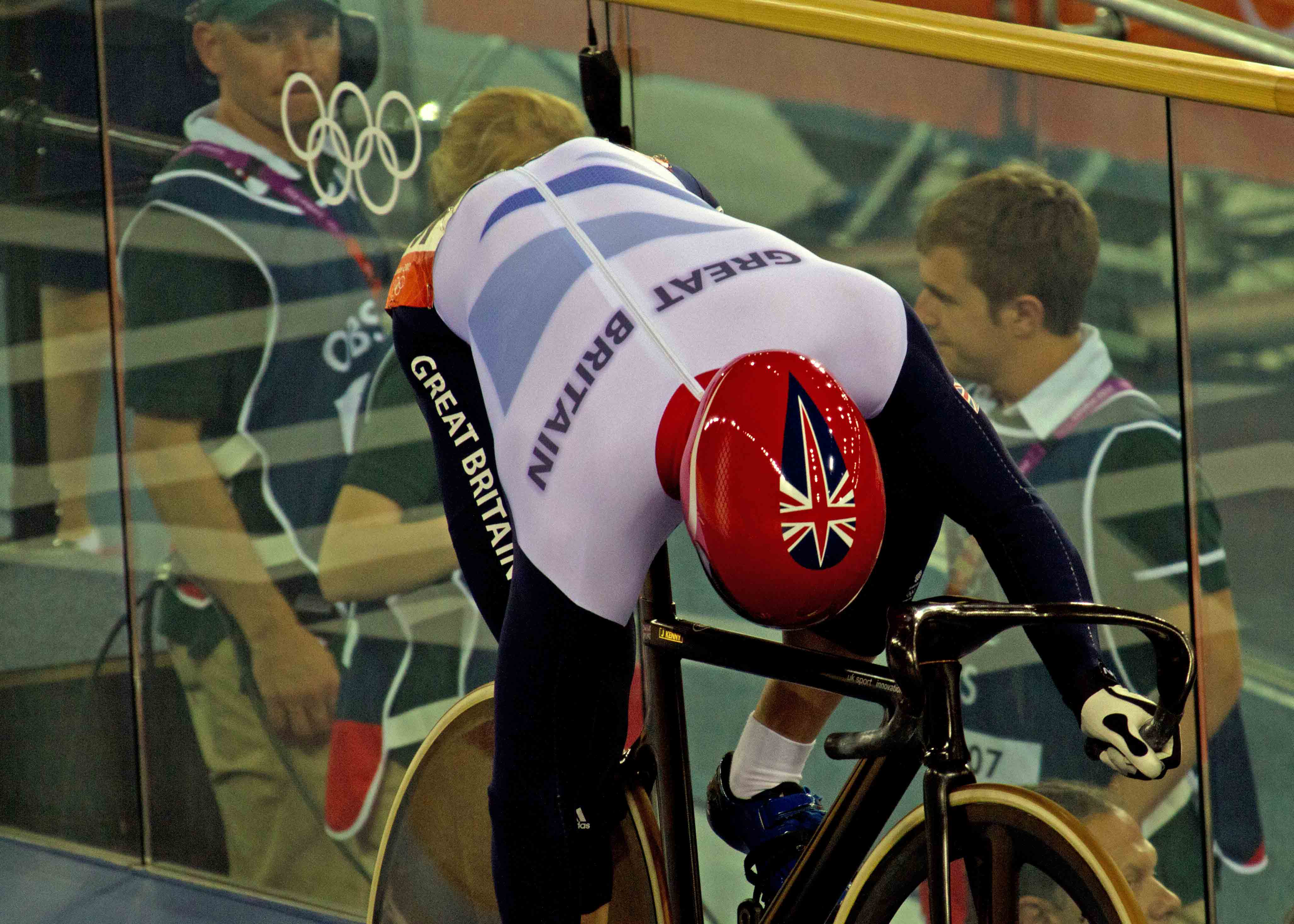
- Jason Kenny
- Venue: London Velopark
- Dates: 4 to 6 August
- Competitors: 17 from 17 nations

Medalists
1st place, gold medalist(s)		Jason Kenny	Great Britain
2nd place, silver medalist(s)		Grégory Baugé	France
3rd place, bronze medalist(s)		Shane Perkins	Australia

The men's cycling sprint at the 2012 Olympic Games in London took place at the London Velopark from 4 to 6 August. There were 17 competitors from 17 nations, with nations once again limited to one cyclist each (the limit had fluctuated between one and two since 1928). The event was won by Jason Kenny of Great Britain, the nation's second consecutive victory in the men's sprint. Kenny was the eighth man to win multiple medals in the event. Kenny beat Grégory Baugé of France in the final. Australia's Shane Perkins took bronze.

== Background ==
This was the 25th appearance of the event, which has been held at every Summer Olympics except 1904 and 1912. Two of the quarterfinalists from 2008 returned: silver medalist Jason Kenny of Great Britain and eighth-place finisher Azizulhasni Awang of Malaysia. The favorite was Grégory Baugé of France, the four-time world champion (2009–2012). The British team, which had both of the finalists at the 2008 Beijing Games (Kenny and champion Chris Hoy), had to choose one because of the rule change that limited nations to one cyclist; Kenny, who had taken silver in the 2011 and 2012 world championships, was selected over Hoy, who had taken bronze in those years. (Baugé's 2011 title was later stripped due to missed doping tests, retroactively elevating Kenny and Hoy to world champion and runner-up). Kenny had never beaten Baugé head-to-head.

No nations made their debut in the men's sprint. France made its 25th appearance, the only nation to have competed at every appearance of the event.

== Qualification ==
There were 18 quota places available for the men's sprint, with a maximum of one cyclist per nation. The 10 nations qualified for the team sprint event could each enter one member of the team in the individual sprint. The other eight places went to the top eight remaining nations on the 2010–12 UCI rankings not yet qualified.

== Competition format ==
The event was a single-elimination tournament, with repechages after the first two rounds, after seeding via time trial. The time trial involved an 875-metre distance, but with only the last 200 metres timed. All other races were 750 metres (three laps of the track) with side-by-side starts, with time kept for the last 200 metres. The first two main rounds featured single head-to-head races, with winners advancing and losers competing in repechages. Repechage races were contested by up to 3 cyclists. Beginning with the quarterfinals, each match pitted two cyclists against each other in best-of-three races.

== Records ==
The records for the sprint are 200 metre flying time trial records, kept for the qualifying round in later Games as well as for the finish of races.

World record	Kevin Sireau (FRA)	9.572	Moscow, Russia	30 May 2009
Olympic record	Chris Hoy (GBR)	9.815	Beijing, China	17 August 2008

Jason Kenny set a new Olympic record of 9.713 seconds in the qualifying round.

== Schedule ==
All times are (British Summer Time)

Date	Time	Round
Saturday, 4 August 2012	10:00; 11:01; 16:00; 16:35; 17:34; 18:30	Qualifying round Round 1 First repechage 1/8 finals Second repechage Classification 9–12
Sunday, 5 August 2012	16:34; 18:47	Quarterfinals; Classification 5–8
Monday, 6 August 2012	16:00; 17:43	Semifinals; Bronze medal match Final

== Results ==
=== Qualifying round ===
Rank	Cyclist	Nation	Time 200 m	Speed km/h	Notes
1	Jason Kenny	Great Britain	9.713	74.127	Q, OR
2	Grégory Baugé	France	9.952	72.347	Q
3	Shane Perkins	Australia	9.987	72.093	Q
4	Robert Förstemann	Germany	10.072	71.485	Q
5	Denis Dmitriev	Russia	10.088	71.371	Q
6	Hersony Canelón	Venezuela	10.123	71.125	Q
7	Seiichiro Nakagawa	Japan	10.144	70.977	Q
8	Zhang Miao	China	10.155	70.901	Q
9	Eddie Dawkins	New Zealand	10.201	70.581	Q
10	Njisane Phillip	Trinidad and Tobago	10.202	70.574	Q
11	Azizulhasni Awang	Malaysia	10.226	70.408	Q
12	Jimmy Watkins	United States	10.247	70.264	Q
13	Pavel Kelemen	Czech Republic	10.311	69.828	Q
14	Damian Zieliński	Poland	10.323	69.747	Q
15	Bernard Esterhuizen	South Africa	10.350	69.565	Q
16	Hodei Mazquiarán	Spain	10.604	67.898	Q
17	Zafeiris Volikakis	Greece	10.663	67.523	Q

=== Round 1 ===
==== Heat 1 ====
Rank	Cyclist	Nation	Time 200 m	Speed km/h	Notes
1	Grégory Baugé	France	wo		Q
—	Zafeiris Volikakis	Greece	DNS		

==== Heat 2 ====
Rank	Cyclist	Nation	Time 200 m	Speed km/h	Notes
1	Shane Perkins	Australia	10.722	67.151	Q
2	Hodei Mazquiarán	Spain			R

==== Heat 3 ====
Rank	Cyclist	Nation	Time 200 m	Speed km/h	Notes
1	Robert Förstemann	Germany	11.100	64.864	Q
2	Bernard Esterhuizen	South Africa			R

==== Heat 4 ====
Rank	Cyclist	Nation	Time 200 m	Speed km/h	Notes
1	Denis Dmitriev	Russia	10.690	67.352	Q
2	Damian Zieliński	Poland			R

==== Heat 5 ====
Rank	Cyclist	Nation	Time 200 m	Speed km/h	Notes
1	Pavel Kelemen	Czech Republic	10.840	66.420	Q
2	Hersony Canelón	Venezuela			R

==== Heat 6 ====
Rank	Cyclist	Nation	Time 200 m	Speed km/h	Notes
1	Jimmy Watkins	United States	10.399	69.237	Q
2	Seiichiro Nakagawa	Japan			R

==== Heat 7 ====
Rank	Cyclist	Nation	Time 200 m	Speed km/h	Notes
1	Azizulhasni Awang	Malaysia	10.473	68.748	Q
2	Zhang Miao	China			R

==== Heat 8 ====
Rank	Cyclist	Nation	Time 200 m	Speed km/h	Notes
1	Njisane Phillip	Trinidad and Tobago	10.221	70.443	Q
2	Eddie Dawkins	New Zealand			R

=== First repechage ===
==== First repechage heat 1 ====
Rank	Cyclist	Nation	Time 200 m	Speed km/h	Notes
1	Hersony Canelón	Venezuela	10.439	68.972	Q
2	Eddie Dawkins	New Zealand			

==== First repechage heat 2 ====
Rank	Cyclist	Nation	Time 200 m	Speed km/h	Notes
1	Seiichiro Nakagawa	Japan	10.792	66.716	Q
2	Damian Zieliński	Poland			

==== First repechage heat 3 ====
Rank	Cyclist	Nation	Time 200 m	Speed km/h	Notes
1	Bernard Esterhuizen	South Africa	10.762	66.902	Q
2	Hodei Mazquiarán	Spain			
3	Zhang Miao	China			

=== 1/8 finals ===
==== 1/8 final 1 ====
Rank	Cyclist	Nation	Time 200 m	Speed km/h	Notes
1	Jason Kenny	Great Britain	10.363	69.477	Q
2	Bernard Esterhuizen	South Africa			R

==== 1/8 final 2 ====
Rank	Cyclist	Nation	Time 200 m	Speed km/h	Notes
1	Grégory Baugé	France	10.490	68.636	Q
2	Seiichiro Nakagawa	Japan			R

==== 1/8 final 3 ====
Rank	Cyclist	Nation	Time 200 m	Speed km/h	Notes
1	Shane Perkins	Australia	10.978	65.585	Q
2	Hersony Canelón	Venezuela	REL		R

==== 1/8 final 4 ====
Rank	Cyclist	Nation	Time 200 m	Speed km/h	Notes
1	Njisane Phillip	Trinidad and Tobago	10.467		Q
2	Robert Förstemann	Germany			R

==== 1/8 final 5 ====
Rank	Cyclist	Nation	Time 200 m	Speed km/h	Notes
1	Denis Dmitriev	Russia	10.278	70.052	Q
2	Azizulhasni Awang	Malaysia			R

==== 1/8 final 6 ====
Rank	Cyclist	Nation	Time 200 m	Speed km/h	Notes
1	Jimmy Watkins	United States	10.511	68.499	Q
2	Pavel Kelemen	Czech Republic			R

=== Second repechage ===
==== Second repechage heat 1 ====
Rank	Cyclist	Nation	Time 200 m	Speed km/h	Notes
1	Robert Förstemann	Germany	10.881	66.170	Q
2	Pavel Kelemen	Czech Republic			C
3	Bernard Esterhuizen	South Africa			C

==== Second repechage heat 2 ====
Rank	Cyclist	Nation	Time 200 m	Speed km/h	Notes
1	Azizulhasni Awang	Malaysia	10.456	68.859	Q
2	Hersony Canelón	Venezuela			C
3	Seiichiro Nakagawa	Japan			C

=== Quarterfinals ===
==== Quarterfinal 1 ====
Rank	Cyclist	Nation	Race 1	Race 2	Race 3	Notes
1	Jason Kenny	Great Britain	10.433	10.030	—	Q
2	Azizulhasni Awang	Malaysia			—	C

==== Quarterfinal 2 ====
Rank	Cyclist	Nation	Race 1	Race 2	Race 3	Notes
1	Grégory Baugé	France	10.472	10.300	—	Q
2	Robert Förstemann	Germany			—	C

==== Quarterfinal 3 ====
Rank	Cyclist	Nation	Race 1	Race 2	Race 3	Notes
1	Shane Perkins	Australia	10.520	10.263	—	Q
2	Jimmy Watkins	United States			—	C

==== Quarterfinal 4 ====
Rank	Cyclist	Nation	Race 1	Race 2	Race 3	Notes
1	Njisane Phillip	Trinidad and Tobago	10.545	10.300	—	Q
2	Denis Dmitriev	Russia			—	C

=== Semifinals ===
==== Semifinal 1 ====
Rank	Cyclist	Nation	Race 1	Race 2	Race 3	Notes
1	Jason Kenny	Great Britain	10.159	10.166	—	Q
2	Njisane Phillip	Trinidad and Tobago			—	B

==== Semifinal 2 ====
Rank	Cyclist	Nation	Race 1	Race 2	Race 3	Notes
1	Grégory Baugé	France	10.358	10.268	—	Q
2	Shane Perkins	Australia			—	B

=== Finals ===
==== Classification 9—12 ====
Rank	Cyclist	Nation	Time 200 m	Speed km/h
9	Seiichiro Nakagawa	Japan	10.950	65.753
10	Pavel Kelemen	Czech Republic		
11	Bernard Esterhuizen	South Africa		
12	Hersony Canelón	Venezuela		

==== Classification 5—8 ====
Rank	Cyclist	Nation	Time 200 m	Speed km/h
5	Denis Dmitriev	Russia	10.340	69.632
6	Jimmy Watkins	United States		
7	Robert Förstemann	Germany		
8	Azizulhasni Awang	Malaysia		

==== Bronze medal match ====
Rank	Cyclist	Nation	Race 1	Race 2	Race 3
3rd place, bronze medalist(s)	Shane Perkins	Australia	10.489	10.297	—
4	Njisane Phillip	Trinidad and Tobago			—

==== Gold medal match ====
Rank	Cyclist	Nation	Race 1	Race 2	Race 3
1st place, gold medalist(s)	Jason Kenny	Great Britain	10.232	10.308	—
2nd place, silver medalist(s)	Grégory Baugé	France			—

== Notes ==
The first round was meant to have 9 heats, with a total of 18 riders. However, due to a rider from the Netherlands withdrawing from the competition the first round had 17 riders with Jason Kenny receiving a bye and therefore automatically qualifying for the next round. Because there was 17 competitors rather than 18, Christos Volikakis, who qualified in 17th place thought that he did not qualify and the competition was switched to a 16 rider format, resulting in him leaving the competition. This was not the case, and therefore Grégory Baugé also qualified automatically. Despite qualifying automatically, both riders had to ride half a lap of the track to qualify.

== Final classification ==
Rank	Cyclist	Nation
1st place, gold medalist(s)	Jason Kenny	Great Britain
2nd place, silver medalist(s)	Grégory Baugé	France
3rd place, bronze medalist(s)	Shane Perkins	Australia
4	Njisane Phillip	Trinidad and Tobago
5	Denis Dmitriev	Russia
6	Jimmy Watkins	United States
7	Robert Förstemann	Germany
8	Azizulhasni Awang	Malaysia
9	Seiichiro Nakagawa	Japan
10	Pavel Kelemen	Czech Republic
11	Bernard Esterhuizen	South Africa
12	Hersony Canelón	Venezuela
13	Zhang Miao	China
14	Eddie Dawkins	New Zealand
15	Damian Zieliński	Poland
16	Hodei Mazquiarán	Spain
17	Zafeiris Volikakis	Greece
