= 2007 UCI Track Cycling World Championships – Men's keirin =

Men's keirin at the 2007 UCI Track Cycling World Championships
- Venue: Palma Arena
- Location: Palma de Mallorca, Spain
- Dates: 30 March 2007

Medalists
gold medal	Chris Hoy	Great Britain
silver medal	Theo Bos	Netherlands
bronze medal	Ross Edgar	Great Britain

The Men's keirin was one of the 10 men's events held at the 2007 UCI Track World Championship, held in Palma de Mallorca, Spain.

29 cyclists from 18 countries participated in the contest. After the 4 qualifying heats, the fastest 2 riders in each heat advance to the second round. The remaining ones face a first round repechage.

The riders that did not advance to the second round race in 4 repechage heats. The first rider in each heat advance to the second round along with the 8 that qualified before.

The first 3 riders from each of the 2 Second Round heats advance to the Final and the remaining will race a consolation 7–12 final.

The whole event took place on March 30. The First Round and Repechage on the morning session and the Second Round and Finals on the evening session. The Final started at 20:40.

== First round ==
=== Heat 1 ===
Rank	Name	Result
1	Kévin Sireau (FRA)	Q
2	Ryan Bayley (AUS)	Q
3	Theo Bos (NED)	R
4	Łukasz Kwiatkowski (POL)	R
5	Leandro Bottasso (ARG)	R
	Roberto Chiappa (ITA)	REL
	Josiah Ng Onn Lam (MAS)	DNF

=== Heat 2 ===
Rank	Name	Result
1	José Antonio Escuredo (ESP)	Q
2	Shane Perkins (AUS)	Q
3	Kazuya Narita (JPN)	R
4	Ross Edgar (GBR)	R
5	Andriy Vynokurov (UKR)	R
6	Maximilian Levy (GER)	R
7	Tim Veldt (NED)	R

=== Heat 3 ===
Rank	Name	Result
1	Mickaël Bourgain (FRA)	Q
2	Mark French (AUS)	Q
3	René Wolff (GER)	R
4	Denis Dmitriev (RUS)	R
5	Adam Ptáčník (CZE)	R
6	Ricardo Lynch (JAM)	R
7	Hodei Mazquiarán Uría (ESP)	R

=== Heat 4 ===
Rank	Name	Result
1	Chris Hoy (GBR)	Q
2	Teun Mulder (NED)	Q
3	Travis Smith (CAN)	R
4	Christos Volikakis (GRE)	R
5	Tang Qi (CHN)	R
6	Mikhail Shikhalev (RUS)	R
7	Toshiaki Fushimi (JPN)	R
8	Mohd Rizal Tisin (MAS)	R

== First Round Repechage ==
=== Heat 1 ===
Rank	Name	Result
1	Theo Bos (NED)	Q
2	Christos Volikakis (GRE)	
3	Adam Ptáčník (CZE)	
4	Mohd Rizal Tisin (MAS)	
5	Maximilian Levy (GER)	

=== Heat 2 ===
Rank	Name	Result
1	Toshiaki Fushimi (JPN)	Q
2	Kazuya Narita (JPN)	
3	Roberto Chiappa (ITA)	
4	Denis Dmitriev (RUS)	
5	Andriy Vynikurov (RUS)	

=== Heat 3 ===
Rank	Name	Result
1	Ross Edgar (GBR)	Q
2	Hodei Mazquiarán Uría (ESP)	
3	Leandro Bottasso (ARG)	
4	René Wolff (GER)	
5	Mikhail Shikhalev (RUS)	

=== Heat 4 ===
Rank	Name	Result
1	Tim Veldt (NED)	Q
2	Ricardo Lynch (JAM)	
3	Łukasz Kwiatkowski (POL)	
	Travis Smith (CAN)	DNF
	Tang Qi (CHN)	DNF

== Second round ==
=== Heat 1 ===
Rank	Name	Result
1	Chris Hoy (GBR)	Q
2	Theo Bos (NED)	Q
3	Shane Perkins (AUS)	Q
4	Tim Veldt (NED)	
5	Kévin Sireau (FRA)	
	Mark French (AUS)	DSQ

=== Heat 2 ===
Rank	Name	Result
1	Ross Edgar (GBR)	Q
2	Teun Mulder (NED)	Q
3	Mickaël Bourgain (FRA)	Q
4	Ryan Bayley (AUS)	
5	José Antonio Escuredo (ESP)	
6	Toshiaki Fushimi (JPN)	

== Finals ==
=== Final 1-6 ===
Rank	Name
	Chris Hoy (GBR)
	Theo Bos (NED)
	Ross Edgar (GBR)
4	Mickaël Bourgain (FRA)
5	Teun Mulder (NED)
6	Shane Perkins (AUS)

=== Final 7-12 ===
Rank	Name
7	Tim Veldt (NED)
8	Kévin Sireau (FRA)
9	Ryan Bayley (AUS)
10	Toshiaki Fushimi (JPN)
11	José Antonio Escuredo (ESP)
