= Volikakis =

Volikakis is a Greek surname (Greek: Βολικάκης). Notable people with the surname include:

- Christos Volikakis (born 1988), Greek cyclist
- Zafeiris Volikakis (born 1989), Greek cyclist, brother of Christos
