= 2006 UCI Track Cycling World Championships – Men's 1 km time trial =

Men's 1 km time trial at the 2006 UCI Track Cycling World Championships
- Venue: Vélodrome de Bordeaux
- Location: Bordeaux, France
- Dates: 14 April
- Winning time: 1:01.361

Medalists
gold medal	Chris Hoy	Great Britain
silver medal	Ben Kersten	Australia
bronze medal	François Pervis	France

The 2006 UCI Track Cycling World Championships - Men's 1 km Time Trial was the 2006 world championship track cycling time trial. It was held on April 14, 2006 at 20:20 in Bordeaux, France. The event was conducted over a single round.

== World record ==
World Record
WR	58.875	Arnaud Tournant (FRA)	La Paz (Colombia)	October 10, 2001

== Results ==
Rank	Name	250 m	500 m	750 m	Time	Speed (km/h)
Rank	Name	250 m	250–500	500–750	750–1000	Speed (km/h)
	Chris Hoy (GBR)	18.018 (1)	31.420 (1)	45.832 (1)	1:01.361	58.669
	Chris Hoy (GBR)	18.018 (1)	13.402 (1)	14.412 (2)	15.529 (1)	58.669
	Ben Kersten (AUS)	18.327 (3)	32.005 (3)	46.464 (3)	1:02.085	57.985
	Ben Kersten (AUS)	18.327 (3)	13.678 (4)	14.459 (3)	15.621 (2)	57.985
	François Pervis (FRA)	18.120 (2)	31.661 (2)	46.370 (2)	1.02.696	57.419
	François Pervis (FRA)	18.120 (2)	13.541 (3)	14.709 (6)	16.326 (12)	57.419
4	Tim Veldt (NED)	18.565 (5)	32.382 (5)	46.992 (5)	1:02.909	57.225
4	Tim Veldt (NED)	18.565 (5)	13.817 (6)	1.610 (5)	15.917 (5)	57.225
5	Kévin Sireau (FRA)	18.643 (7)	32.172 (4)	46.776 (4)	1:03.107	57.045
5	Kévin Sireau (FRA)	18.643 (7)	13.529 (2)	14.604 (4)	16.331 (13)	57.045
6	Feng Yong (CHN)	19.461 (21)	33.146 (13)	47.551 (8)	1:03.314	56.859
6	Feng Yong (CHN)	19.461 (21)	13.685 (5)	14.405 (1)	15.763 (4)	56.859
7	Alois Kaňkovský (CZE)	18.805 (9)	32.726 (8)	47.461 (6)	1:03.569	56.631
7	Alois Kaňkovský (CZE)	18.805 (9)	13.921 (7)	14.735 (7)	16.108 (7)	56.631
8	Masaki Inoue (JPN)	18.641 (6)	32.618 (7)	47.535 (7)	1:03.799	56.427
8	Masaki Inoue (JPN)	18.641 (6)	13.977 (8)	14.917 (10)	16.264 (11)	56.427
9	Joel Leonard (AUS)	19.066 (15)	33.177 (14)	48.039 (13)	1:04.092	56.169
9	Joel Leonard (AUS)	19.066 (15)	14.111 (12)	14.862 (9)	16.053 (6)	56.169
10	Carsten Bergemann (GER)	19.210 (17)	33.521 (17)	48.360 (15)	1:04.111	56.152
10	Carsten Bergemann (GER)	19.210 (17)	14.311 (18)	14.839 (8)	15.751 (3)	56.152
11	Michael Seidenbecher (GER)	18.815 (11)	33.000 (12)	48.016 (10)	1:04.210	56.066
11	Michael Seidenbecher (GER)	18.815 (11)	14.185 (15)	15.016 (12)	16.194 (9)	56.066
12	Tomasz Schmidt (POL)	18.913 (12)	32.978 (11)	48.026 (11)	1:04.619	55.711
12	Tomasz Schmidt (POL)	18.913 (12)	14.065 (10)	15.048 (14)	16.593 (15)	55.711
13	Cam Mackinnon (CAN)	18.719 (8)	32.903 (9)	48.037 (12)	1:04.720	55.624
13	Cam Mackinnon (CAN)	18.719 (8)	14.184 (14)	15.134 (15)	16.683 (17)	55.624
14	Wilson Meneses (COL)	19.253 (19)	33.612 (20)	48.646 (16)	1:04.805	55.551
14	Wilson Meneses (COL)	19.253 (19)	14.359 (19)	15.034 (13)	16.159 (8)	55.551
15	Athanasios Mantzouranis (GRE)	18.811 (10)	32.919 (10)	48.153 (14)	1:04.886	55.481
15	Athanasios Mantzouranis (GRE)	18.811 (10)	14.108 (11)	15.234 (16)	16.733 (18)	55.481
16	Benjamin Wittmann (GER)	18.513 (4)	32.547 (6)	47.944 (9)	1:05.150	55.257
16	Benjamin Wittmann (GER)	18.513 (4)	14.034 (9)	15.397 (18)	17.206 (21)	55.257
17	Saveriano Sangion (ITA)	19.785 (24)	33.962 (22)	48.952 (17)	1:05.194	55.219
17	Saveriano Sangion (ITA)	19.785 (24)	14.177 (13)	14.990 (11)	16.242 (10)	55.219
18	Hiroyuki Inagaki (JPN)	19.630 (23)	33.837 (21)	49.128 (20)	1:05.756	54.747
18	Hiroyuki Inagaki (JPN)	19.630 (23)	14.207 (16)	15.291 (17)	16.628 (16)	54.747
19	David Cresswell (NZL)	19.001 (14)	33.388 (15)	48.998 (19)	1:06.115	54.450
19	David Cresswell (NZL)	19.001 (14)	14.387 (20)	15.610 (20)	17.117 (20)	54.450
20	Michael Rodríguez (PUR)	19.242 (18)	33.534 (18)	48.956 (18)	1:06.200	54.380
20	Michael Rodríguez (PUR)	19.242 (18)	14.292 (17)	15.422 (19)	17.244 (22)	54.380
21	Leonardo Bottasso (ARG)	19.144 (16)	33.597 (19)	49.316 (21)	1:06.579	54.071
21	Leonardo Bottasso (ARG)	19.144 (16)	14.453 (21)	15.719 (23)	17.263 (23)	54.071
22	Yannik Morin (CAN)	18.915 (13)	33.459 (16)	49.339 (22)	1:06.874	53.832
22	Yannik Morin (CAN)	18.915 (13)	14.544 (22)	15.880 (25)	17.535 (25)	53.832
