= Jason Kenny =

English track cyclist (born 1988)

Sir Jason Kenny CBE
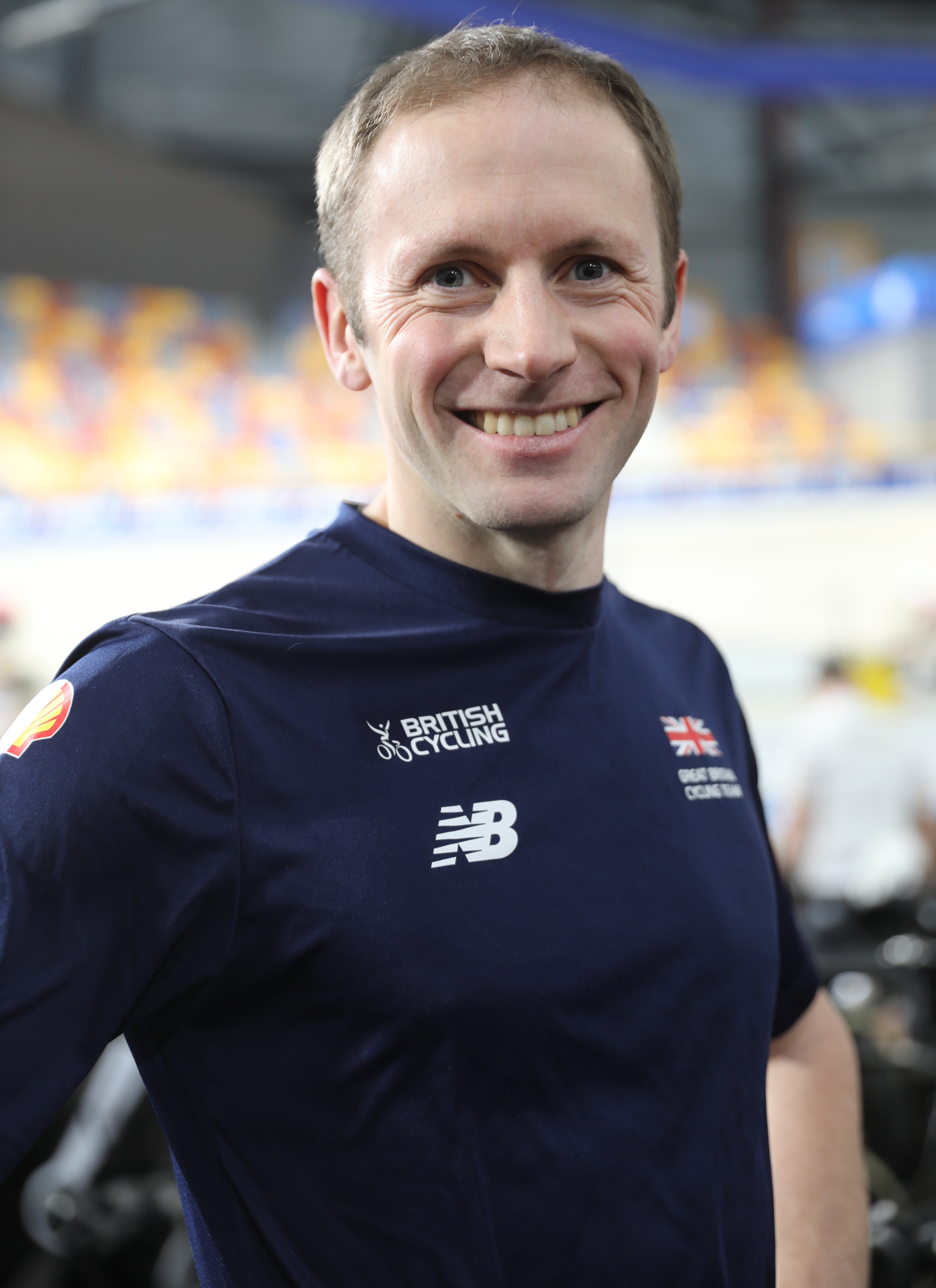
- Kenny in 2024

Personal information
- Full name: Jason Francis Kenny
- Born: 23 March 1988 (age 38) Bolton, Greater Manchester, England
- Height: 1.77 m (5 ft 10 in)
- Weight: 80 kg (176 lb)

Cycling career
- Sport: Cycling
- Discipline: Track
- Role: Rider
- Rider type: Sprinter

Professional team
- 2008–2013: Team Sky+ HD
Medal record
Representing Great Britain
Event	1st	2nd	3rd
Olympic Games	7	2	0
World Championships	3	5	2
European Games	0	0	1
European Championships	1	2	3
Commonwealth Games	0	2	0
Total	11	11	6
Olympic Games
Gold medal – first place	2008 Beijing	Team sprint
Gold medal – first place	2012 London	Team sprint
Gold medal – first place	2012 London	Sprint
Gold medal – first place	2016 Rio de Janeiro	Team sprint
Gold medal – first place	2016 Rio de Janeiro	Sprint
Gold medal – first place	2016 Rio de Janeiro	Keirin
Gold medal – first place	2020 Tokyo	Keirin
Silver medal – second place	2008 Beijing	Sprint
Silver medal – second place	2020 Tokyo	Team sprint
World Championships
Gold medal – first place	2011 Apeldoorn	Sprint
Gold medal – first place	2013 Minsk	Keirin
Gold medal – first place	2016 London	Sprint
Silver medal – second place	2009 Pruszków	Team sprint
Silver medal – second place	2011 Apeldoorn	Team sprint
Silver medal – second place	2012 Melbourne	Sprint
Silver medal – second place	2018 Apeldoorn	Team sprint
Silver medal – second place	2020 Berlin	Team sprint
Bronze medal – third place	2010 Ballerup	Team sprint
Bronze medal – third place	2012 Melbourne	Keirin
European Games
Bronze medal – third place	2019 Minsk	Team sprint
European Championships
Gold medal – first place	2010 Pruszków	Keirin
Silver medal – second place	2013 Apeldoorn	Keirin
Silver medal – second place	2019 Apeldoorn	Team sprint
Bronze medal – third place	2010 Pruszków	Sprint
Bronze medal – third place	2010 Pruszków	Team sprint
Bronze medal – third place	2013 Apeldoorn	Sprint
Representing England
Commonwealth Games
Silver medal – second place	2014 Glasgow	Team sprint
Silver medal – second place	2014 Glasgow	Sprint

Sir Jason Francis Kenny (born 23 March 1988) is an English former track cyclist, specialising in the individual and team sprints. Kenny is the winner of most Olympic gold medals (7) and medals (9) by a British athlete. Kenny's seven Olympic gold medals place him joint 15th in gold medals won in the Summer Olympic games since 1896. He holds the records for both most Olympic golds and most Olympic medals won by a cyclist.

With seven gold and two silver medals, Kenny is both the most successful cyclist in Olympic history and the most successful British Olympian overall. His wife, Dame Laura Kenny, is the most successful female British athlete in the history of the games (with five gold medals and one silver); together they are the most successful married couple in Summer Olympic history where both spouses have won at least one gold medal.

After winning World and European Junior titles in 2006 and achieving medals in the under-23 European championships in 2007, Kenny was selected to compete for Great Britain at the 2008 Summer Olympics in Beijing. With Chris Hoy and Jamie Staff, he won a gold medal in the team sprint, breaking the world record in the qualifying round. He finished behind Hoy in the final of the individual sprint, gaining a silver medal.

In January 2012, he gained his first world championship title, when Grégory Baugé's results were nullified after a backdated 12-month ban for missing a drugs test, and the Union Cycliste Internationale (UCI) promoted Kenny to the gold medal. At the 2012 Summer Olympics in London, he won gold medals in both the team sprint and the individual sprint, beating Baugé in the final. At the 2016 Summer Olympics Kenny again won in the Team Sprint and the Individual Sprint, and also won the Keirin. In the 2020 Summer Olympics he won the Keirin again.

== Early life ==
Kenny was born on 23 March 1988. Kenny's parents are Lorraine and Michael Kenny, and he has an older brother, Craig. He was educated at Mount St Joseph School in Farnworth.

He was a keen sportsperson during his youth, showing ability as a football goalkeeper as well as playing cricket and tennis, but having learned to ride a bicycle at a young age, became involved in track racing when he and his brother attended a track session at the National Cycling Centre in Manchester, when an uncle had booked a session and had some spare places.

== Career ==
=== Future Stars series ===
Kenny's first track competition was when he competed in the Future Stars series, a junior competition held as part of the Revolution series at the Manchester Velodrome. Kenny competed in a number of the ad hoc events during the first season of the Revolution in 2003/2004. In the second season, he competed in the first fully-fledged Future Series competition, taking part in a number of sprint and endurance events for 15- and 16-year-olds, during the season of four track meetings. When the 2004/2005 season finished in February 2005, Kenny was in the top 10 of the final standings.

=== 2005–2007 ===
During the 2005/2006 racing season, Kenny competed for Great Britain at a junior level as a sprinter and won world titles at the junior world championships. In the 2006/2007 season, he competed at a senior level for the team and took part in a number of World Cup Classics events across the world and Revolution events in Manchester, against some of the world's best Sprint riders. In the Revolution events in the 2007/2008 season, Kenny beat the world champion Theo Bos.

=== 2008 ===
Kenny made his debut in the world championships in 2008, finishing fifth overall in the sprint competition. In the Olympic Games, he made the team sprint squad, replacing Ross Edgar at man 2 in the team just before the Games. The team defeated the French team that had beaten them to the world title in Manchester only months earlier by over half a second. In the sprint competition, Kenny reached the final, but was defeated by his teammate Chris Hoy 2–0. His rise as a cyclist had been rapid. He had progressed from competing in a domestic junior series to Olympic Champion in only 3 1/2 years.

Kenny was appointed Member of the Order of the British Empire (MBE) in the 2009 New Year Honours.

=== 2009–2012 ===
In the season following the 2008 Games, Kenny scored three gold medals in the 2008–09 Track Cycling World Cup Classics, and took a silver in the team sprint at the 2009 UCI Track Cycling World Championships alongside Jamie Staff and Matthew Crampton, losing out to France. In 2010 he took his first title at the European Track Championships, winning the gold in the keirin. At the 2012 World Championships, Kenny took a silver in the sprint behind Grégory Baugé and a bronze in the keirin.

=== 2012 Olympics ===
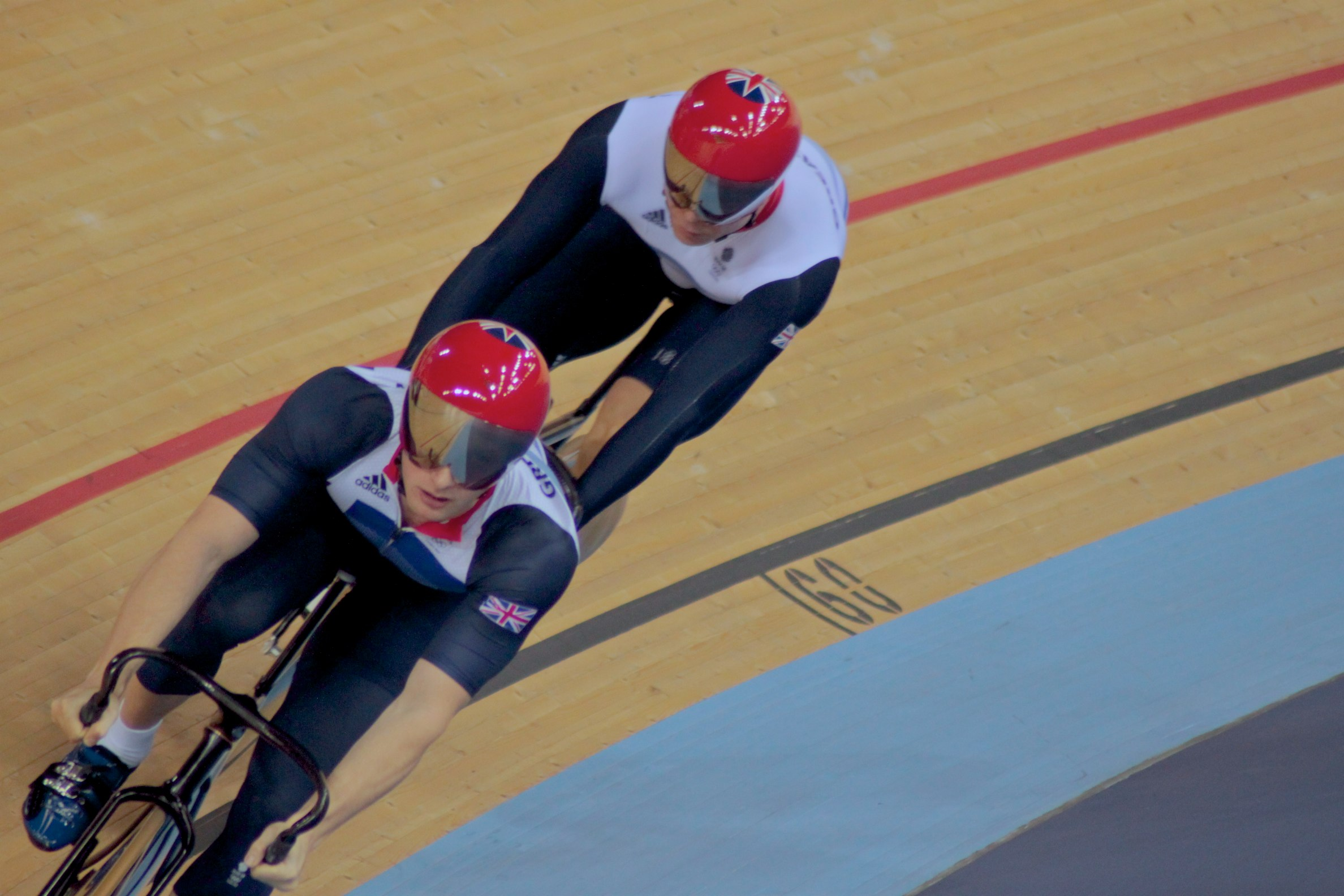
Kenny (front) and Chris Hoy during the team sprint at the 2012 Olympic Games

At the London 2012 Olympic Games Kenny won gold in the team sprint with Chris Hoy and Philip Hindes, setting a new world record in the London Velopark with a time of 42.6 seconds. He also won gold in the men's sprint final, setting a new Olympic record in qualifying and avenging his previous losses to Baugé with a 200m time of 10.308s in his final lap. Kenny was appointed Officer of the Order of the British Empire (OBE) in the 2013 New Year Honours for services to cycling.

=== 2013–2016 ===
Following the 2012 Olympics Kenny competed at the 2013 World Championships, in the individual sprint and Team Sprint races he finished 7th and 6th respectively. He won the keirin event.

His 2013–14 season started with national titles in all three Olympic sprint, team sprint and the keirin. At the first round of the UCI Track World Cup he failed to qualify for the sprint event, whilst finishing 4th in the Keirin and winning a bronze medal in the Team Sprint. At the second round of the World Cup, he secured silver medals in the Sprint and Team Sprint, but did not contest the Keirin. The World Cup/Championships season finished with the UCI World Championships where he failed to secure any medals, finishing 5th in all three events he contested.

At the Commonwealth Games he won a silver medal in the Team Sprint. In the Sprint event he qualified 11th out of 12 qualifiers, and went on to lose his first round against Eddie Dawkins of New Zealand. This left him in the repechage, where he beat his Great Britain teammates Callum Skinner and Lewis Oliva to make it to the 1/8 finals. Despite his poor form in the early rounds, in the 1/8 round he beat Matthew Glaetzer, the fastest qualifier (qualifying almost half a second quicker) and holder of the Commonwealth record, in two straight rides, to secure his way into the semi-finals, where he beat Peter Lewis after three rides. In the final he won a silver medal, losing 2–1 to Sam Webster.

In the 2014–15 UCI Track Cycling World Cup, Kenny took a gold in the team sprint in the round in Guadalajara. 2015 brought national titles in the 1 km time trial and the team sprint. In the run up to the Rio Olympics, he was part of the squad that won gold in the Hong Kong round of the 2015–16 Track World Cup alongside Hindes and Skinner and went on to win the gold in the sprint at the 2016 Track World Championships in London, defeating Matthew Glaetzer 2–1 in the final.

=== 2016 Summer Olympics ===
At the Rio 2016 Olympic Games Kenny won gold in the men's team sprint with Philip Hindes and Callum Skinner. The trio broke the world record twice in the Olympic competition, first in qualifying and again in the final against New Zealand, after the latter had set a new world record themselves in the first round. He won gold in the men's individual sprint, beating Callum Skinner in the final after losing just one ride, to eventual bronze medallist Denis Dmitriev in the semi-finals. On 16 August Kenny won the gold medal in the final of the men's Keirin after the race was re-started twice due to derny infringements, to join Chris Hoy as the holder of 6 Olympic gold medals, more than any other GB athlete.

Kenny was appointed Commander of the Order of the British Empire (CBE) in the 2017 New Year Honours for services to cycling.

=== 2017–2020 ===
Following the Rio Games, Kenny made an unannounced retirement from competition, later stating that this was due to the physical and mental toll of cycle racing. However, after a year away from the track and the birth of his first child he decided to return to racing, stating in an interview in September 2017 that the break had "refreshed" him. Kenny made his comeback at a round of the Revolution series at Manchester Velodrome in January 2018, setting the fastest time in sprint qualifying ahead of a field that included rival Grégory Baugé and placing second in the sprint and keirin competitions. He returned to international championship competition at the 2018 UCI Track Cycling World Championships in Apeldoorn, where he was part of the silver medal-winning squad in the team sprint alongside Hindes, Jack Carlin, Ryan Owens and Joseph Truman, earning Team GB's first team sprint medal at the World Championships since 2011. Kenny, Carlin and Owens went on to earn two further team sprint silvers at the 2019 UEC European Track Championships, also held in Apeldoorn, and the 2020 World Championships on Berlin.

=== 2020 Summer Olympics ===
At the delayed 2020 Tokyo Olympics in the summer of 2021, Kenny, Carlin and Owens took another team sprint silver, losing out to the Dutch team in the final. Although this was Kenny's first loss in an Olympic final, the medal made him Britain's most successful Olympian. In the sprint, he placed eighth in qualifying, and his bid to defend his title received a setback when he lost in the 1/8 finals to Denis Dmitriev: although he was able to secure a slot in the quarter finals by winning the repechage, he was knocked out in the last eight by Harrie Lavreysen, losing 2–0 to the Dutchman before finishing last in the small final, securing eighth place overall. In the keirin, Kenny took the gold medal after going on the attack when the derny pulled off the track with three laps to go, building on a gap that had already appeared between himself and the rest of the field led by Matthew Glaetzer and holding on to the lead to cross the finish line with a gap of over three quarters of a second over the second placed Azizulhasni Awang. The win gave him his seventh gold medal and ninth medal overall, making him the British Olympian with most golds and most medals.

Kenny was made a Knight Bachelor in the 2022 New Year Honours for services to cycling, and therefore granted the title sir. His wife Laura was appointed Dame Commander of the Order of the British Empire (DBE) in the same list, also for services to cycling. In February of that year, Kenny announced that he was retiring from competition in order to take the role of men's podium sprint coach with British Cycling.

== Personal life ==
On 24 September 2016, Kenny married the track cyclist Laura Trott. As of 2016, the couple live near Knutsford in Cheshire. On 14 February 2017, it was announced that the couple were expecting their first child; their son Albie was born on 23 August 2017. In November 2021, his wife suffered a miscarriage at nine weeks, and in January 2022, his wife suffered an ectopic pregnancy. In January 2023, it was announced that they were expecting their second child. Their second son was born in July 2023. In December 2024, a third pregnancy was announced, and his wife gave birth to a daughter in May 2025.

Kenny is a motorsport enthusiast and has participated in car racing in his spare time, including racing a Ginetta G40, and scored a podium finish in a round of the Radical European Masters at the Nürburgring in 2014.

Taken together, Jason and Laura Kenny have won 12 Olympic gold medals, which places them among the most successful Olympic medalist families of all time. He was knighted in the 2022 New Year Honours List. His wife received a damehood at the same time.

== Major results ==
2005
1st Team sprint, National Track Championships
2006
UCI Track World Cup

1st Team sprint (Moscow)
3rd Team sprint (Los Angeles)

UCI Junior Track World Championships

1st Sprint
1st Team sprint
1st Keirin

2007
UEC European Under–23 Track Championships

3rd Sprint
3rd Team sprint

2008
Olympic Games

1st Team sprint
2nd Sprint

UCI Track World Cup

1st Sprint (Manchester)
1st Team sprint (Manchester)
2nd Keirin (Manchester)

2009
UCI Track World Cup

1st Team sprint (Copenhagen)
2nd Team sprint (Manchester)
3rd Sprint (Manchester)

2nd Team sprint, Track World Championships
UEC European Under–23 Track Championships

2nd Keirin
2nd Sprint
2nd Team sprint

2010
UEC European Track Championships

1st Keirin
3rd Sprint
3rd Team sprint

1st Team sprint, National Track Championships
3rd Team sprint, UCI Track World Championships
1st Team sprint,
2011
UCI Track World Championships

1st Sprint
2nd Team sprint

UCI Track World Cup Classics

2nd Sprint (Manchester)
3rd Team sprint (Manchester)

2012
Olympic Games

1st Sprint
1st Team sprint

UCI Track World Championships

2nd Sprint
3rd Keirin

UCI Track World Cup

2nd Team sprint (Glasgow)
3rd Team sprint (London)

2013
1st Keirin, UCI Track World Championships
National Track Championships

1st Keirin
1st Sprint
1st Team sprint

UEC European Track Championships

2nd Keirin
3rd Sprint

UCI Track World Cup

2nd Sprint (Aguascalientes)
2nd Team sprint (Aguascalientes)
3rd Team sprint (Manchester)

2014
1st Team Sprint, National Track Championships
Commonwealth Games

2nd Sprint
2nd Team sprint

UCI Track World Cup

1st Team sprint (Guadalajara)
2nd Sprint (Guadalajara)

2015
National Track Championships

1st Kilo
1st Team sprint

2016
Olympic Games

1st Team sprint
1st Sprint
1st Keirin

1st Sprint, UCI Track World Championships
UCI Track World Cup

1st Team sprint (Hong Kong)
3rd Sprint (Hong Kong)

2018
2nd Team sprint, UCI Track World Championships
2019
2nd Team sprint, UEC European Track Championships
2020
2nd Team sprint, UCI Track World Championships
2021
Olympic Games

1st Keirin
2nd Team sprint

== See also ==
- 2012 Olympics gold post boxes in the United Kingdom
