= Gennadii Genus =

Ukrainian cyclist

Personal information
- Born: 23 January 1990 (age 36)

Cycling career
- Sport: Cycling
- Discipline: Track cycling
- Role: Rider
- Rider type: 1 km time trial

Gennadii Genus (born 23 January 1990) is a Ukrainian male track cyclist. He competed in the 1 km time trial event at the 2013 UCI Track Cycling World Championships.
