= Ross Edgar =

Scottish cyclist (born 1983)

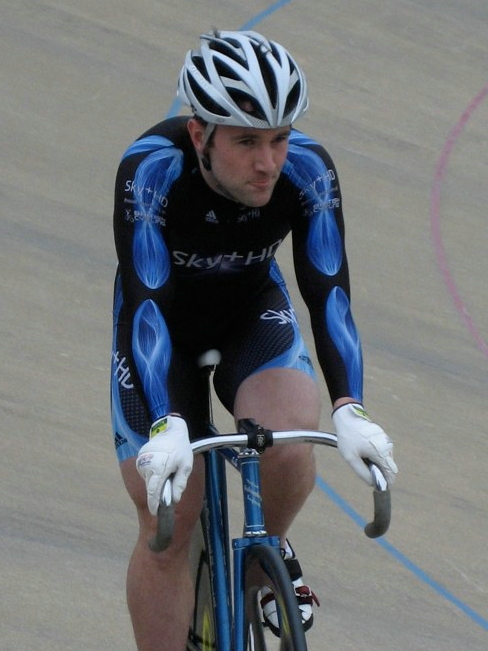

Personal information
- Born: 3 January 1983 (age 43) Newmarket, United Kingdom

Cycling career
- Sport: Cycling
- Current team: Australia
- Discipline: Track
- Role: Rider / Coach
- Rider type: Sprinter / Retired

Amateur team
- West Suffolk Wheelers

Professional teams
- 2008: Science in Sport
- 2002–2012: Team Sky & Great Britain
- 2013–2014: Team IG–Sigma Sport
- 2016–2017: UCI & Korea
- 2018: Australia
Medal record
Men's track cycling
Representing Great Britain
Olympic Games
Silver medal – second place	2008 Beijing	Keirin
World Championships
Silver medal – second place	2007 Palma de Mallorca	Team Sprint
Silver medal – second place	2008 Manchester	Team sprint
Bronze medal – third place	2007 Palma de Mallorca	Keirin
Bronze medal – third place	2010 Ballerup	Team Sprint
Representing Scotland
Commonwealth Games
Gold medal – first place	2006 Melbourne	Team sprint
Silver medal – second place	2006 Melbourne	Individual sprint
Bronze medal – third place	2006 Melbourne	Keirin
Bronze medal – third place	2002 Manchester	Team sprint

Ross Edgar (born 3 January 1983) is a Scottish track cyclist who represented Scotland at the 2002 and 2006 Commonwealth Games, where he won a gold medal in the team sprint riding with Chris Hoy and Craig MacLean. He competed for Great Britain at the 2004 and 2008 Olympic Games

He won a silver medal at the 2007 UCI Track World Championships in the team sprint and a bronze medal in the Keirin.

He won a silver medal at the 2008 Beijing Olympics.

In London 2012 Olympics, Edgar who was to represent Great Britain in the Team Sprint final was replaced & missed out on a Gold Medal which the team won.

Representing Scotland internationally he was Born in Newmarket, Suffolk. Having qualified to represent Scotland through his father David.

Ross Edgar as an amateur youth rider started with West Suffolk Wheelers based in Bury St Edmunds, Suffolk alongside younger brother Bruce.

In December 2012 it was announced that Edgar had signed for the IG-Sigma Sport cycling team for the 2013 season, adding road racing commitments to his existing membership of the Great Britain track cycling programme. After the team withdrew from racing at the end of the season Edgar was confirmed as s member of the Great Britain Olympic Podium Programme, switching from the sprint to the endurance squad.

Pre 2018, Edgar was a UCI coach based in Aigle, Switzerland, where he also coached Korean cyclist Lee Hye-Jin, who finished 8th in the keirin at the 2016 Rio Olympics.

Currently he is a track sprint coach for Cycling Australia, based in Adelaide.

== Results ==
2012
Track Cycling World Cup

3rd Team sprint, Round 4, London (with Chris Hoy and Jason Kenny)

2010
British National Team Sprint Championships

Gold

World Track Championships, Copenhagen

Bronze, Team Sprint

2009
Track Cycling World Cup Classics

1st Team sprint, Round 1, Manchester

2008
Olympics

Silver, Men's Keirin

World Track Championships, Manchester

Silver, Team Sprint

Track Cycling World Cup Classics

1st Team sprint (with Jason Kenny and Jamie Staff), Round 1, Manchester

2nd Manchester International Keirin
2007
World Track Championships, Majorca

Silver, Team Sprint
Bronze, Men's Keirin

Track Cycling World Cup Classics

2nd Keirin, Round 3, Los Angeles
3rd Sprint, Round 3, Los Angeles
3rd Team sprint, Round 3, Los Angeles (with Jason Kenny and Jason Queally)
1st Team sprint, Round 4, Manchester (with Chris Hoy and Craig MacLean)
2nd Sprint, Round 1, Sydney

3rd Manchester International Keirin
British National Track Championships

1st Sprint

2006
Commonwealth Games, Melbourne

Gold, Team Sprint (Scotland)
Silver, Men's Sprint
Bronze, Men's Keirin

Track Cycling World Cup Classics

1st Team sprint, Round 1, Sydney (with Chris Hoy and Craig MacLean)
2nd Sprint, Round 1, Sydney

British National Track Championships

1st Keirin
2nd Sprint
2nd Team sprint (with Matt Crampton and Jamie Staff)

2005
European Track Championships (under-23)

Silver, Sprint

Track Cycling World Cup Classics

1st Team sprint, Round 2, Manchester (with Chris Hoy and Craig MacLean)

2004
European Track Championships (under-23)

Gold, Sprint

British National Track Championships

1st Sprint
1st Team sprint (with David Heald and Barney Storey)

2003
Track Cycling World Cup Classics

3rd Sprint, Round 4, Sydney

British National Track Championships

1st Sprint

2002
Commonwealth Games, Manchester

Bronze, Team Sprint (Scotland)
