= Chris Hoy =

British cyclist (born 1976)

Sir Chris Hoy MBE
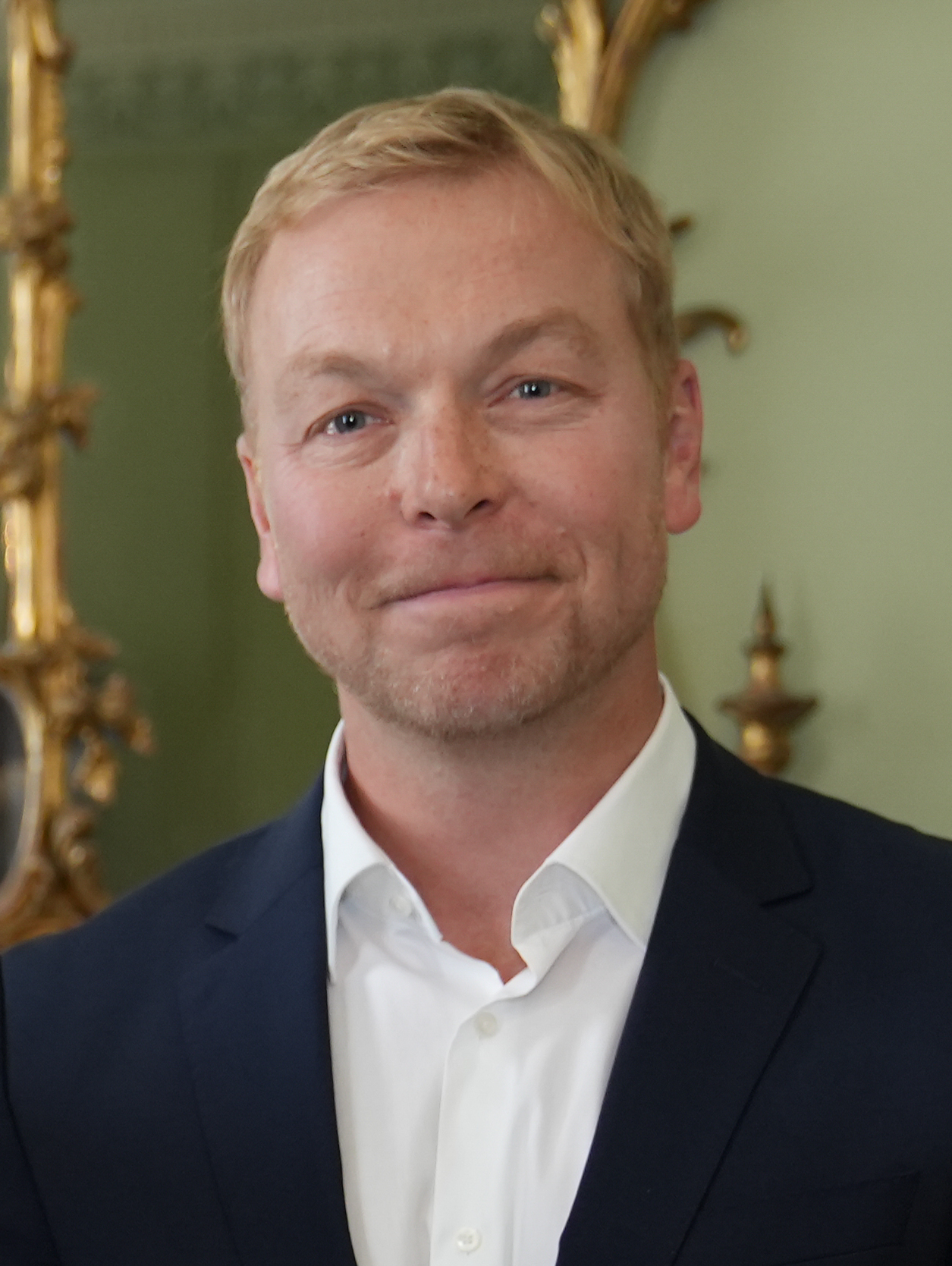
- Hoy in 2025

Personal information
- Full name: Christopher Andrew Hoy
- Born: 23 March 1976 (age 50) Edinburgh, Scotland
- Height: 1.85 m (6 ft 1 in)
- Weight: 92 kg (203 lb; 14 st 7 lb)

Cycling career
- Sport: Cycling
- Discipline: Track
- Role: Rider

Amateur teams
- 1984–1986: Scotia BMX
- 1986–1991: GT Factory BMX Team
- 1992–1993: Dunedin CC
- 1994–2001: City of Edinburgh RC
- 2001–2003: Team Athena
- 2004: Team Persil
- 2005–2007: Team Wolfson Microelectronics / Miller

Professional team
- 2008–2013: Team Sky+ HD
Medal record
Representing Great Britain
Men's track cycling
Event	1st	2nd	3rd
Olympic Games	6	1	0
World Championships	11	8	6
Commonwealth Games	2	0	2
European Championships	0	0	1
Total	19	9	9
Olympic Games
Gold medal – first place	2004 Athens	1 km time trial
Gold medal – first place	2008 Beijing	Sprint
Gold medal – first place	2008 Beijing	Team sprint
Gold medal – first place	2008 Beijing	Keirin
Gold medal – first place	2012 London	Team sprint
Gold medal – first place	2012 London	Keirin
Silver medal – second place	2000 Sydney	Team sprint
World Championships
Gold medal – first place	2002 Ballerup	1 km time trial
Gold medal – first place	2002 Ballerup	Team sprint
Gold medal – first place	2004 Melbourne	1 km time trial
Gold medal – first place	2005 Los Angeles	Team sprint
Gold medal – first place	2006 Bordeaux	1 km time trial
Gold medal – first place	2007 Palma de Mallorca	1 km time trial
Gold medal – first place	2007 Palma de Mallorca	Keirin
Gold medal – first place	2008 Manchester	Sprint
Gold medal – first place	2008 Manchester	Keirin
Gold medal – first place	2010 Ballerup	Keirin
Gold medal – first place	2012 Melbourne	Keirin
Silver medal – second place	1999 Berlin	Team sprint
Silver medal – second place	2000 Manchester	Team sprint
Silver medal – second place	2006 Bordeaux	Team Sprint
Silver medal – second place	2007 Palma de Mallorca	Team Sprint
Silver medal – second place	2008 Manchester	Team sprint
Silver medal – second place	2011 Apeldoorn	Keirin
Silver medal – second place	2011 Apeldoorn	Team sprint
Silver medal – second place	2011 Apeldoorn	Sprint
Bronze medal – third place	2001 Antwerp	Team sprint
Bronze medal – third place	2003 Stuttgart	Team sprint
Bronze medal – third place	2004 Melbourne	Team sprint
Bronze medal – third place	2005 Los Angeles	1 km time trial
Bronze medal – third place	2010 Ballerup	Team Sprint
Bronze medal – third place	2012 Melbourne	Sprint
European Championships
Bronze medal – third place	2010 Pruszków	Team Sprint
Representing Scotland
Commonwealth Games
Gold medal – first place	2002 Manchester	1 km time trial
Gold medal – first place	2006 Melbourne	Team sprint
Bronze medal – third place	2002 Manchester	Team sprint
Bronze medal – third place	2006 Melbourne	1 km time trial

Sir Christopher Andrew Hoy (born 23 March 1976) is a former track cyclist and racing driver from Scotland who represented Great Britain at the Olympic and World Championships and Scotland at the Commonwealth Games.

Hoy is an 11-time world champion and a six-time Olympic champion. With a total of seven Olympic medals, six gold and one silver, Hoy is the second most decorated Olympic cyclist of all time. Between 2012 and 2021, he was the most successful British Olympian and the most successful Olympic cyclist of all time. His 17 global titles across four disciplines make Hoy the second most successful track cyclist at the global level of all times behind Harrie Lavreysen.

With his three gold medals in the 2008 Summer Olympics, Hoy became Scotland's most successful Olympian, the first British male athlete to win three gold medals in a single Olympic Games since Henry Taylor in 1908, and the most successful Olympic cyclist of all time. After winning a further two gold medals (in the keirin and team sprint) at the 2012 Summer Olympics, Hoy has won the second-most Olympic gold medals (six) of all British athletes, behind Jason Kenny, and more total medals (seven) than any except fellow cyclists Kenny and Sir Bradley Wiggins. Hoy has won Olympic gold medals in more separate events — team sprint (twice), match sprint, keirin (twice) and kilo — than any other cyclist.

In September 2023, Hoy was diagnosed with stage 4 prostate cancer. In October 2024, he reported that his condition was terminal and that he had been given between two and four years to live.

== Early life ==
The son of David and Carol Hoy, Chris Hoy was born on 23 March 1976 and grew up in Murrayfield, Edinburgh. He was privately educated at George Watson's College, followed by two years at the University of St Andrews studying Mathematics and Physics until 1996. He subsequently transferred to the University of Edinburgh, from which he graduated BSc (Hons.) in Applied Sports Science in 1999.

Hoy, whose first bike cost £5, was inspired to cycle at age six by the 1982 film E.T. the Extra-Terrestrial. Hoy says the BMX bike he saw in the film is what inspired him to start cycling. Before track cycling, Hoy raced BMX between the ages of 7 and 14 and was ranked second in Britain, fifth in Europe, and ninth in the world. He received sponsorship from Slazenger and Kwik-Fit, and was competing in Europe and the USA. He first became aware of track cycling when he watched TV coverage of Scottish sprinter Eddie Alexander winning a bronze medal at the 1986 Commonwealth Games in Edinburgh. Hoy also represented the Scotland Junior Rowing Team and was second in the 1993 National Rowing Championships with Grant Florence in the coxless pairs. He played rugby as part of his school's team.

== Early cycling career ==
Hoy joined his first cycling club, Dunedin C.C., in 1990, aged 14, and began concentrating on track cycling in 1993, when he joined the City of Edinburgh Racing Club. In 1997, he and fellow Scottish sprinter Craig MacLean were tipped as medal prospects by Phil Liggett.

Hoy won silver in Berlin, at the 1999 UCI Track Cycling World Championships in the team sprint, riding at man one, Craig MacLean at two and Jason Quealley at three. Regular teammates in the team sprint over the years included Craig MacLean, Ross Edgar, Jamie Staff, Jason Queally, Matthew Crampton, and Jason Kenny.

== Olympics ==
=== 2000 Sydney Olympics ===
Following Jason Queally's gold medal in the Kilo TT early in the Games, Hoy joined with him and Craig MacLean to win his first Olympic Medal, a Silver in the Team Sprint or "Olympic Sprint" as it was then called. Although they were beaten by an excellent French team, the two medals won for GB were to become the start of a renaissance of British track cycling after the debacle of the Atlanta Games, for which he and track endurance contemporary Sir Bradley Wiggins would eventually become the figureheads along with road sprinter Mark Cavendish. All three would eventually win BBC Sports Personality of the Year as cycling became mainstream in Great Britain.

=== 2004 Olympics: Athens ===
Hoy arrived in Athens in the form of his life. His main event was the Kilo Time Trial. He was ranked No. 1 and was last man off. The sea level World Record was broken four times as he sat in the track centre waiting for his start. He had been involved in an accident in the athlete's village just a few days prior to competition where he came off his bike in front of a village bus, narrowly avoiding serious injury. As he came out of the starting gate, his scarred arms and legs showed how close he was to not competing.

The previous rider was Arnaud Tournant who set the fastest ever sea-level kilo. Chris came next and, cheered on by thousands of loyal British fans, he bettered the time on each lap, setting a new sea-level World and Olympic Record of 1.00.711. This was the first of his Olympic gold medals, but he suffered disappointment as Great Britain could only finish fifth in the Team Sprint.

=== Post-2004 Olympics ===
Angered by the decision to remove his specialist event, the Kilo, from the Olympic programme after the 2004 games, Hoy sought to develop in other events. The first of these was the emerging keirin event. This event involves between six and eight riders following a small motorbike (the Derny) around the 250m track for 5.5 laps, as the bike slowly builds up the speed. The bike pulls off with 2.5 laps to go and the riders race for the line. Hoy attended keirin school in Japan during 2005 and had previously competed at the keirin in various events but one of his first major successes was at the Manchester round of the World Cup Classics Series in 2007, shortly before the World Championships, where he also won, ahead of his teammate Ross Edgar.

Hoy’s results indicated that he was transitioning from primarily power-based sprinting events, such as the Kilo and the Team Sprint, to performing strongly in more tactical sprint disciplines, including the keirin and the individual sprint. His performances in these newer events continued to reflect his capacity to produce high levels of power.

=== 2007 world record attempt ===
On 12 May 2007, Hoy attempted the world record for the kilometre. He fell 0.005 seconds short, clocking 58.880. He set a record for the 500m flying start at 24.758 seconds, over a second less than the 25.850 set by Arnaud Duble. Hoy set the sea-level kilometre record of 1 minute 0.711 seconds by winning the Olympics in Athens in 2004. The outright record of 58.875 seconds is held by Arnaud Tournant (France), set during 2001 at altitude in La Paz, Bolivia, where Hoy also attempted to break the record. At the time, only 3 sub-60sec kilos had ever been ridden; Hoy recorded two of these over two days in La Paz.

Hoy's main achievement is in the individual sprint, considered the blue ribbon event of track cycling. Kilo riders like Hoy have historically not fared as well at this event, as they were less experienced in the tactical elements required for the sprint. Previously, Hoy had competed in the sprint at various World Cup events and Revolution meetings in Manchester, but it was not one of his main events and he did not compete in it at the World Championships or the Olympics.

In the semi-finals Hoy defeated Italian veteran Roberto Chiappa 2–0, to set up a meeting in the final against France's Kévin Sireau. Sireau was the World Cup Classics points winner for the season and had defeated Hoy 2–0 in their previous meeting only a few weeks earlier. However, with the vocal Manchester crowd behind him Hoy was not to be denied victory and he completed the win 2–0, the first British man to win the sprint title in 52 years since Reg Harris.

=== 2008 Olympics ===
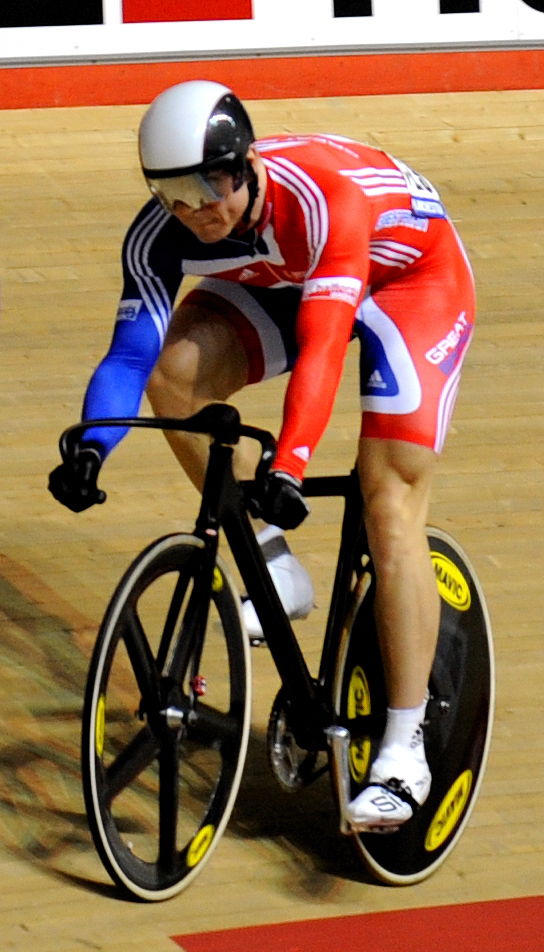
Hoy at the 2008 UCI Track Cycling World Championships in Manchester

Hoy became the first British male Olympian for 100 years to claim three golds at one games at the 2008 Summer Olympics in Beijing. This came when he won the men's keirin, the men's team sprint and also the men's individual sprint.

=== 2008/09 season ===
Hoy did not race at the first major event of the 2009/10 season, the World Cup Classics Event in Manchester on 4 October – 2 November. He instead made an appearance to sign autographs and commentate with the BBC. He made his return to racing in the UK at the Revolution 22 event in Manchester in December. He received a standing ovation from the Manchester faithful at the start of the event when he was introduced to the crowd. At this event, Hoy won both the Sprint and Keirin competitions, defeating likes of Jason Kenny, Jamie Staff, Ross Edgar, Matthew Crampton and Teun Mulder along the way. Hoy competed in the World Cup Classics series' final event in Copenhagen, Denmark in February, helping his team to a gold medal in the team sprint event. However, he crashed out during the men's Keirin final and was forced to miss the final day of competition, including the men's sprint. Although at first, his injury seemed minor, he returned to Manchester where, following a scan, he was diagnosed with a serious degloving injury which finished his season and kept him off his bike for almost three months. He was unable to compete as planned at the Revolution 24 event in Manchester the following weekend, he did however make an appearance at the event. He had to pull out of the World Championships in Poland at the end of March, where he would have attempted to defend two World titles, because of the hip injury.

=== 2009/10 season ===
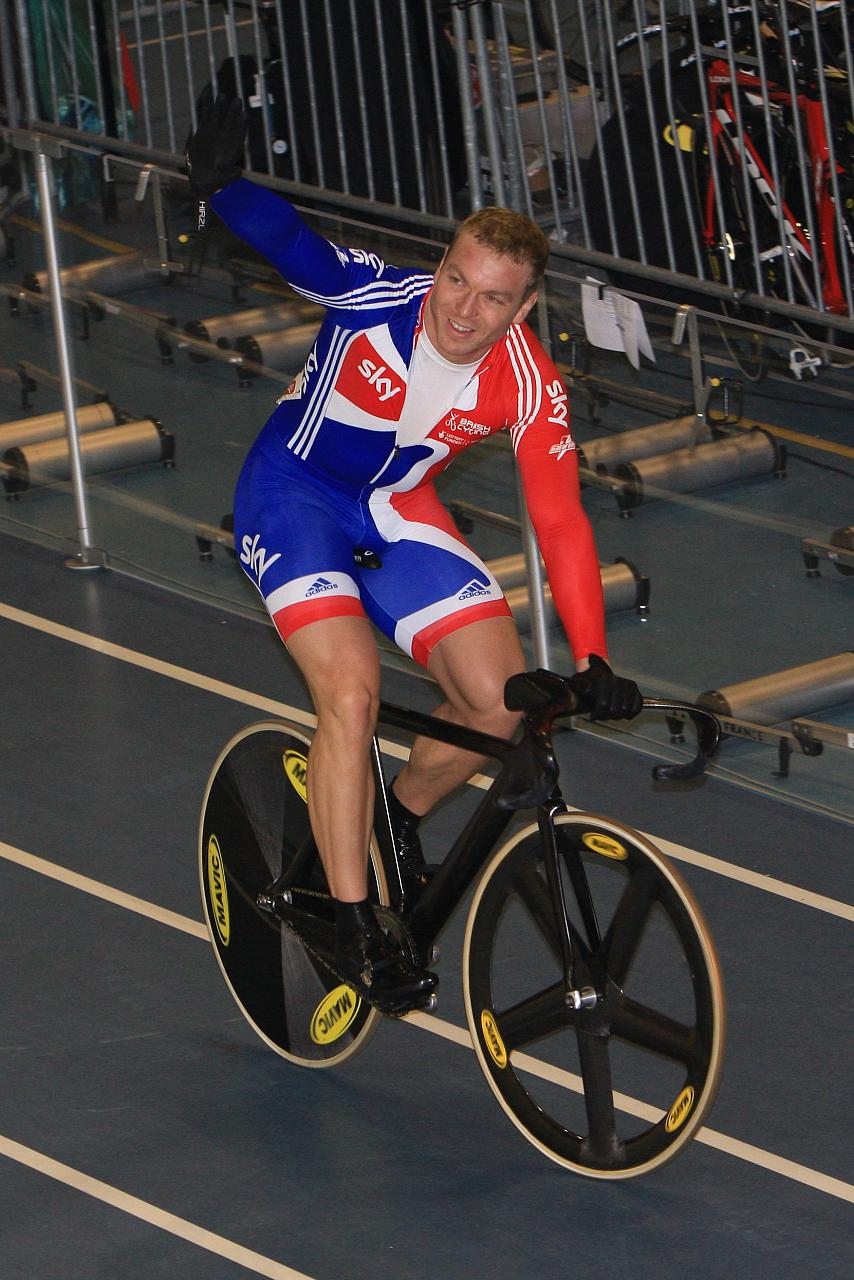
Hoy celebrates winning the keirin at the 2010 UCI Track Cycling World Championships in Ballerup, Denmark

Hoy started the 09/10 track season at the National Cycling Centre, Manchester, at the British National Championships where he took only his second (and third) ever individual national titles. He took gold medals in the Keirin, Sprint and was part of the Team Sprint Team representing team SKY along with Jamie Staff and Jason Kenny. Two weeks later, he raced in round one of the UCI World Cup at the same venue and took gold in the Men's Keirin. He then went into day 2 of the competition and took gold in the sprint event, beating fellow Brit Matthew Crampton in the final 2–0. A third World Cup gold came in the Team Sprint on the Sunday. Having ridden and won 12 events over the weekend, he withdrew from the International Japanese Keirin which was consequently won by Crampton.

At the 2010 UCI World Championships, Hoy was beaten in the quarter-final of the men's sprint event by his German opponent, Robert Förstemann, who won after making an attack from the start line. He was part of the GB men's team sprint that took the bronze. In the Keirin event, Hoy won the gold medal, despite crashing in the heats, to take his tenth world title.

=== 2010/11 season ===
Hoy lost in the first round of the men's sprint at the European Championships to Ireland's Felix English. At the Manchester World Cup event in February 2011, Hoy lost in the semi-finals to Jason Kenny. Hoy took the match sprint title at the British National Championships in October 2011.

=== 2011/12 track season ===
At the 2012 World Cup event held in the new London Velodrome, Hoy won three medals. He won gold in the keirin and bronze in the team sprint, before winning gold in the Men's Sprint, losing just one race in four rounds.

=== 2012 Olympics ===
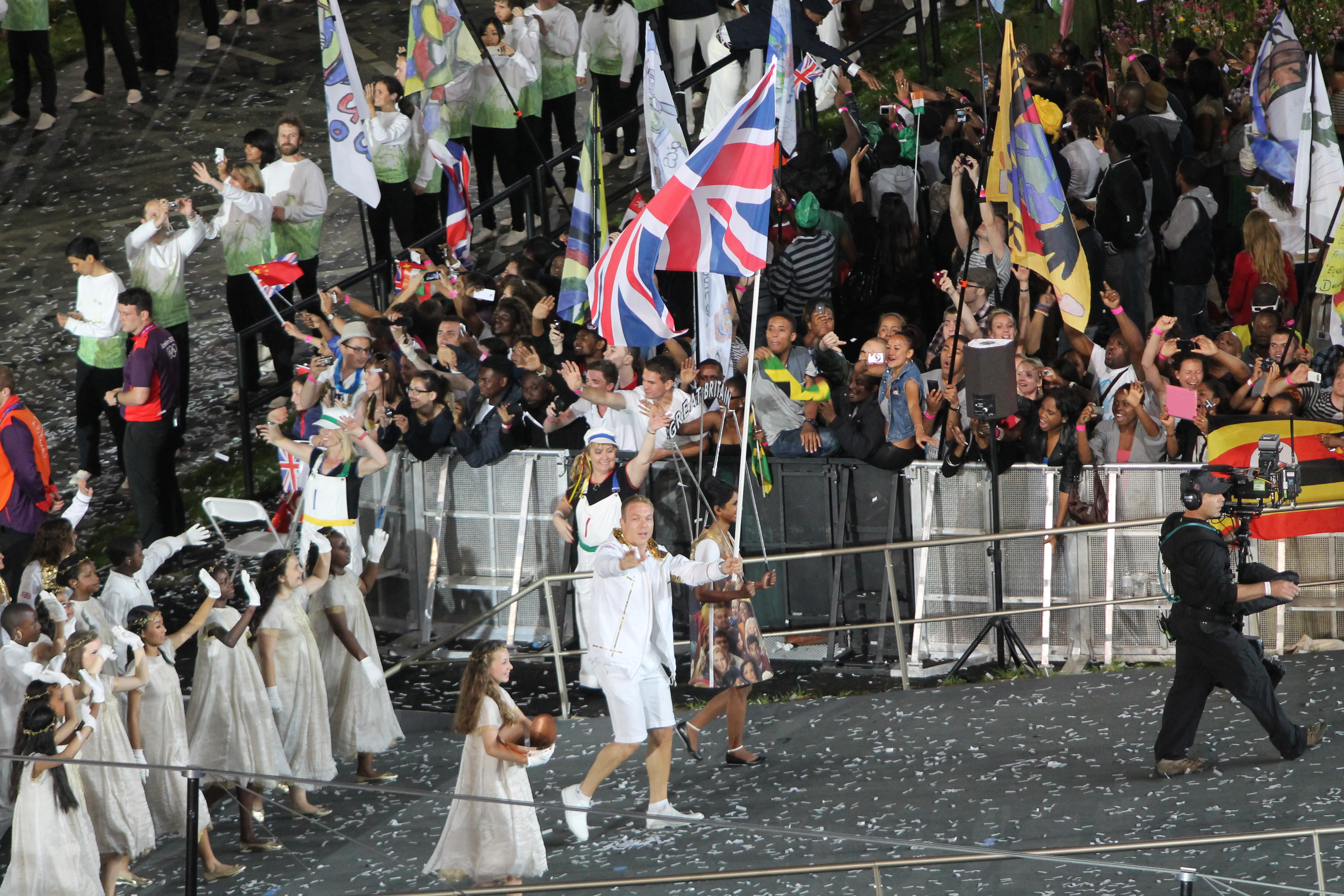
Hoy leading Team GB out as the team's flag carrier at the 2012 Summer Olympics opening ceremony

Hoy was an ambassador for the 2012 Olympic Games in London. Hoy led Team GB out as the team's flag carrier at the opening ceremony. He then went on to win gold in the team sprint with Jason Kenny and Philip Hindes, setting a new world record in the velodrome and becoming Team GB's joint gold record holder with Sir Steve Redgrave's tally of five gold medals with a total of six medals (5 gold, 1 silver).

On 7 August 2012, Hoy won gold in the Keirin to overtake Sir Steve Redgrave and become the most successful British Olympian ever, winning a total of 6 gold medals. This also made him the joint holder of most medals won by any British athlete in the Olympic Games with fellow cyclist Sir Bradley Wiggins and Jason Kenny.

=== Retirement ===
On 18 April 2013, Hoy announced his retirement from competitive cycling. He said he was very proud to have taken part in the transformation of the sport.

Since retiring, Hoy has been a regular pundit for BBC coverage of cycling events. The include three Commonwealth Games: Glasgow 2014, Gold Coast 2018 and Birmingham 2022, and three Summer Olympic Games: Rio 2016, Tokyo 2020 and Paris 2024.

== Motorsport career ==
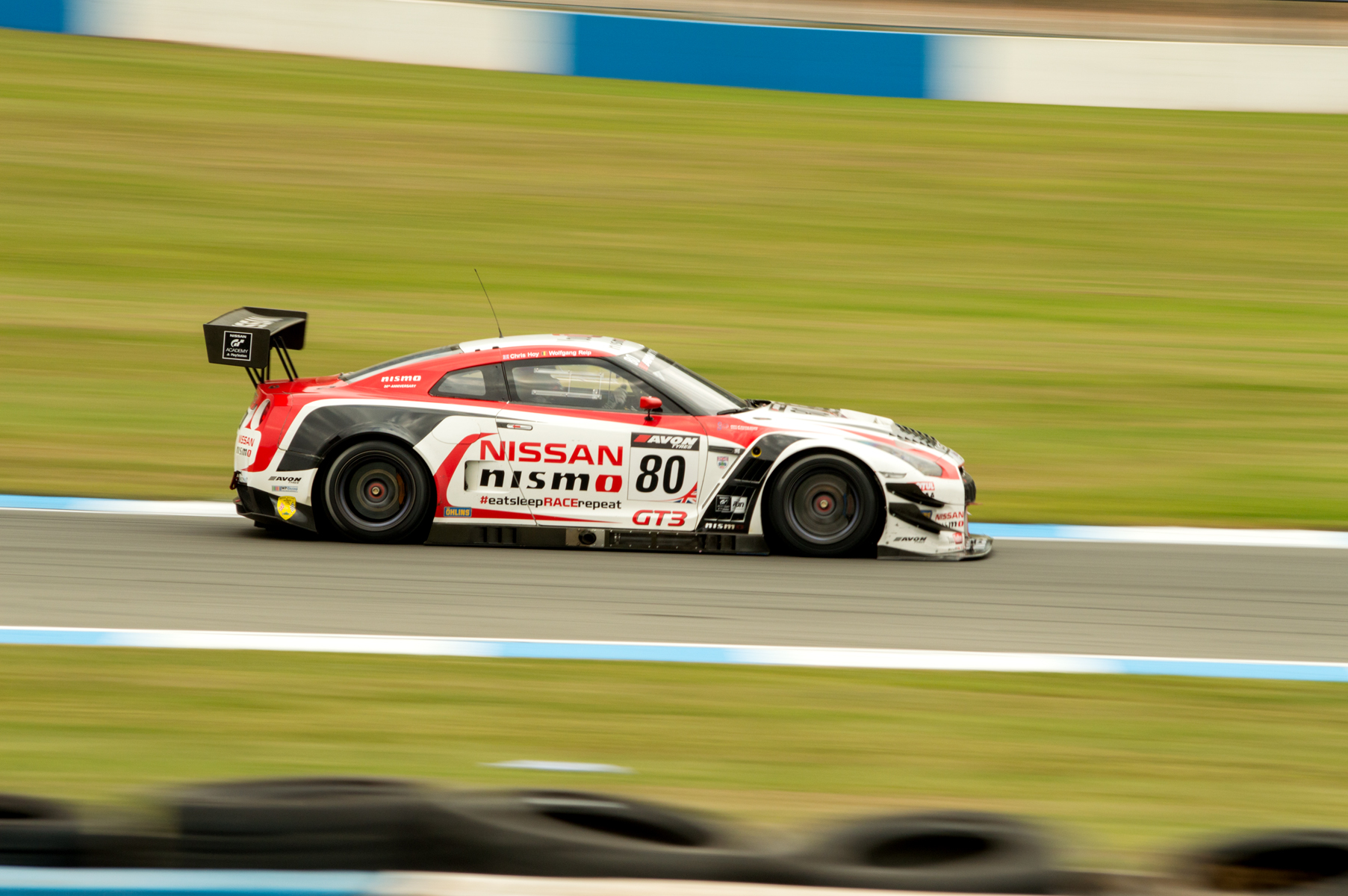
Hoy contested the 2014 British GT Championship in a Nissan GT-R

Hoy's interest in motorsport competition led him to contest the inaugural season of the Radical Sportscars SR1 Cup, scooping his first motorsport podium at Snetterton in the same season. Hoy has since contested selected rounds of the Radical SR3 Challenge and Radical European Masters in Radical's SR3 RS and SR8 RX open sportscars. On 8 April 2014 it was announced that Hoy would be joining the British GT championship driving a Nissan GT-R Nismo GT3 with a view to competing in the 24 Hours of Le Mans in 2016.

Hoy took his first victory in international competition at the opening round of the 2015 European Le Mans Series at Silverstone where he drove a Ginetta-Nissan to a class win alongside team-mate Charlie Robertson. The pairing took another two wins in the series' LMP3 class, including at the penultimate round at Circuit Paul Ricard, which clinched them the class title with a round to spare.

Hoy subsequently competed at the 2015 Race of Champions at the London Olympic Stadium, receiving a late invitation to race as part of Team All Stars in the Nations Cup alongside Romain Grosjean as a replacement for Jorge Lorenzo after the motorcyclist suffered leg burns as a result of post-race celebrations on his motorbike when he clinched that season's MotoGP title.

However, Hoy and Grosjean were knocked out in the first round by the Young Stars team of Pascal Wehrlein and Jolyon Palmer.

In March 2016, it was confirmed that Hoy would be entered for the 2016 Le Mans 24 Hours, sharing a Ligier JS P2-Nissan with Andrea Pizzitola and Michael Munemann. He was the first Summer Olympic medallist to compete at Le Mans, the ninth former Olympian to race there and the second Olympic champion to do so, after alpine skier Henri Oreiller.

Hoy and his team-mates finished the race in 17th overall and 12th in class.

=== Complete British GT Championship results ===
(key) (Races in bold indicate pole position) (Races in italics indicate fastest lap)

Year	Team	Car	Class	1	2	3	4	5	6	7	8	9	10	DC	Points
2014	Nissan GT Academy Team RJN	Nissan GT-R Nismo GT3	GT3	OUL; 1; 9	OUL; 2; 13	ROC; 1; 13	SIL; 1; 7	SNE; 1; 13	SNE; 2; 16	SPA; 1; 16	SPA; 2; 2	BRH; 1; 11	DON; 1; 11	20th	29
2019	Multimatic Motorsports	Ford Mustang GT4	GT4	OUL; 1	OUL; 2	SNE; 1	SNE; 2	SIL; 1	DON; 1; 18	SPA; 1; 27	BRH; 1	DON; 1		17th	18

=== Complete European Le Mans Series results ===
Year	Entrant	Class	Chassis	Engine	1	2	3	4	5	6	Rank	Points
2015	Team LNT	LMP3	Ginetta LMP3	Nissan VK50 5L V8	**SIL**; 1	IMO; Ret	**RBR**; 1	**LEC**; 1	**EST**; 3		1st	94
2016	Algarve Pro Racing	LMP2	Ligier JS P2	Nissan VK45DE 4.5 L V8	SIL; 10	IMO; Ret	RBR	LEC	SPA	EST	34th	1

==== 24 Hours of Le Mans results ====
Year	Team	Co-Drivers	Car	Class	Laps	Pos.	Class Pos.
2016	(Portugal) Algarve Pro Racing	(United Kingdom) Michael Munemann (France) Andrea Pizzitola	Ligier JS P2-Nissan	LMP2	341	17th	12th

=== 24 Hours of Silverstone results ===
Year	Team	Co-Drivers	Car	Car No.	Class	Laps	Pos.	Class Pos.
2015	(United Kingdom) Team LNT	(United Kingdom) Lawrence Tomlinson (United Kingdom) Charlie Robertson (United Kingdom) Mike Simpson (France) Gaetan Paletou	Ginetta Juno LMP3	12	1	418	13th	2nd

=== Complete FIA World Rallycross Championship results ===
(key)

==== Supercar ====
Year	Entrant	Car	1	2	3	4	5	6	7	8	9	10	WRX	Points
2019	Christopher Hoy	Ford Fiesta MK7	UAE	BAR; 15	BEL	GBR	NOR	SWE	CAN	FRA	LAT	RSA	29th	2

== Hoy Bikes ==
Hoy unveiled the brand which bears his name in November 2012, three months after winning the double Olympic gold in London. The debut range included three road bikes and four city bikes, as well as a track bike. It was later extended by several other designs, including bicycles for children.

== Personal life and illness ==
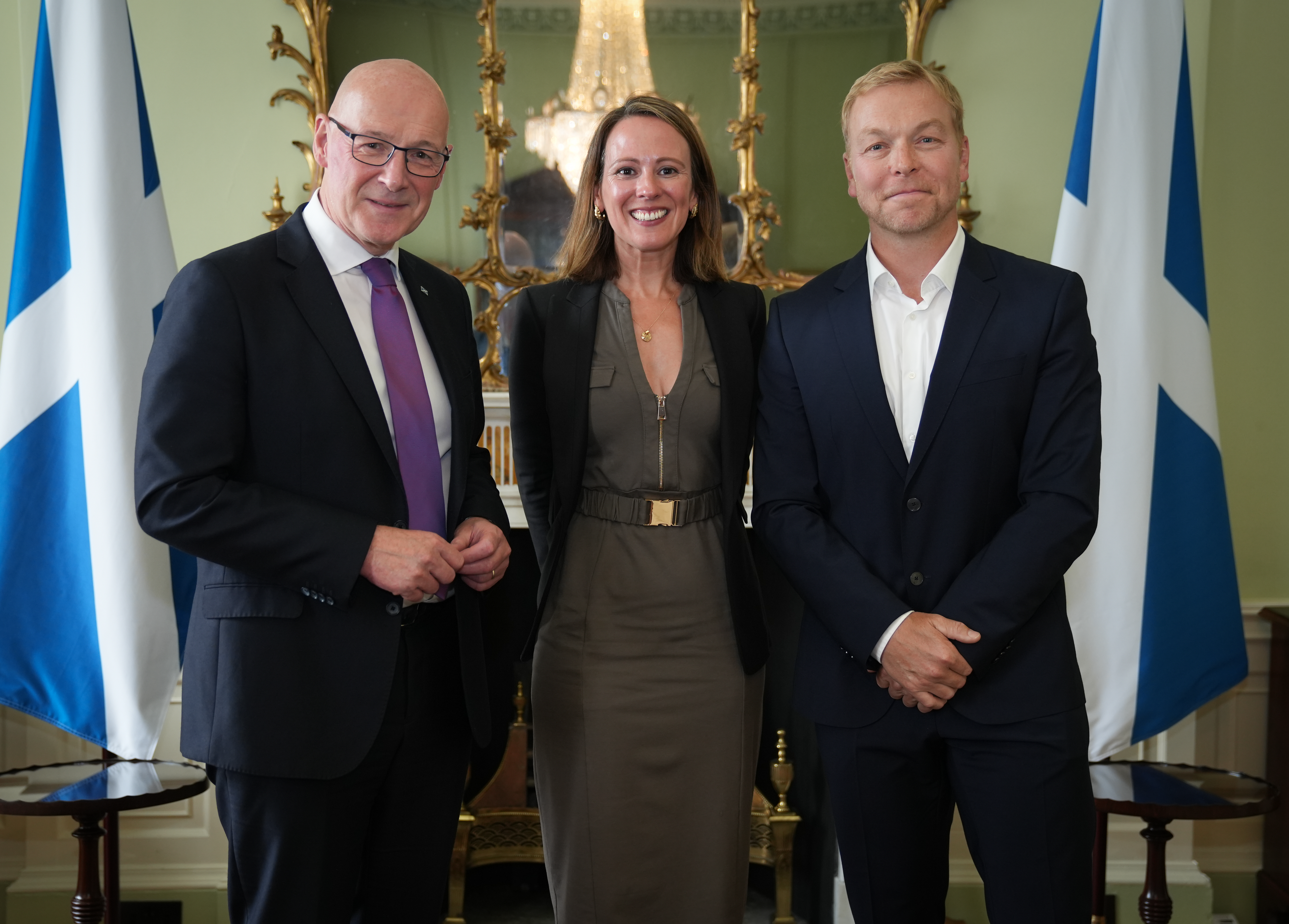
Hoy and his wife with John Swinney, First Minister of Scotland, at Bute House during a Prostate Cancer Roundtable meeting with the Scottish Government, August 2025

Hoy is married to Sarra Kemp, Lady Hoy, a lawyer from Edinburgh. They were married in 2010 at St Giles' Cathedral, Edinburgh. They have two children, a son and a daughter.

Hoy's autobiography was published in 2009. Hoy's first two children's fiction books, about a young cyclist called Flying Fergus, were published in 2016. In 2020, Hoy published another children's book titled Be Amazing.

In April 2013, Hoy accepted the appointment of ambassador to the Royal Air Force Air Cadets and assumed the rank of Honorary Group Captain RAFVR(T). He has since relinquished this role. In 2013, Hoy was appointed as an ambassador for UNICEF UK, having been an International Inspiration ambassador for UNICEF since 2009.

Hoy has been Ambassador for the Scottish Action for Mental Health since 2009. In that time he has devoted many hours to raising awareness of, and funds for, the mental health cause.

In December 2016 and December 2017, Hoy supported the Scottish social enterprise Social Bite by sleeping out at their Sleep in the Park events to raise money for homeless people.

Hoy is a supporter of Scotland rugby and has presented the match ball before selected games at Murrayfield Stadium. He is also a supporter of Heart of Midlothian Football Club.

=== Terminal prostate cancer ===
In September 2023, Hoy was diagnosed with stage 4 prostate cancer, after complaining of a pain in his shoulder. News of his condition was made public on 16 February 2024, but no details were given and it was announced that Hoy was undergoing chemotherapy. In October 2024, he made public the nature and severity of the disease, that it had spread to his bones and was now terminal. He said that he had been given between two and four years to live. In November 2024, Health Secretary Wes Streeting announced NHS England would review prostate cancer screening after Hoy called for change.

== Medal history ==
World Championships

- 1999 – Team sprint
- 2000 – Team sprint
- 2001 – Team sprint
- 2002 – 1 km time trial; Team sprint
- 2003 – Team sprint
- 2004 – 1 km time trial; Team sprint
- 2005 – Team sprint; 1 km time trial
- 2006 – 1 km time trial; Team sprint
- 2007 – Keirin; 1 km time trial; Team sprint
- 2008 – Sprint; Keirin; Team sprint
- 2010 – Keirin; Team sprint
- 2011 – Keirin; Team sprint; Sprint
- 2012 – Keirin; Sprint

Olympic Games

- 2000 – Team sprint (with Craig MacLean and Jason Queally)
- 2004 – 1 km Track time trial
- 2008 – Team sprint (with Jason Kenny and Jamie Staff); Keirin; Sprint
- 2012 – Team sprint (with Jason Kenny and Philip Hindes); Keirin

Track Cycling World Ranking

- 2009–10 – 3rd Keirin
- 2010–11 – 2nd Keirin, 3rd Team sprint
- 2011–12 – 1st Keirin

Commonwealth Games

- 2002 – 1 km time trial; Team sprint (with Craig MacLean and Ross Edgar)
- 2006 – Team sprint (with Craig MacLean and Ross Edgar); 1 km time trial

Special awards

- 2003, 2008 – BBC Scotland Sports Personality of the Year
- 2008 – BBC Sports Personality of the Year
- 2014 – BBC Sports Personality of the Year Lifetime Achievement Award

== Honours ==
- 2005: Honorary Doctor of Science, University of Edinburgh
- 2005: Appointed a Member of the Most Excellent Order of the British Empire (MBE) "for services to cycling" in the 2005 New Year Honours.
- 2005: Honorary Doctorate from Heriot-Watt University
- 2008: Sportsman of the Year, elected by the Sports Journalists' Association, winning a ballot of its membership ahead of Formula One world champion Lewis Hamilton and Olympic sailor Ben Ainslie.
- 2008: BBC Sports Personality of the Year. He finished ahead of Formula One world champion Lewis Hamilton and Olympic swimmer Rebecca Adlington. Hoy became the second cyclist ever to win the award after Tom Simpson in 1965.
- 2009: Honorary Doctor of Science, University of St Andrews
- 2009: Appointed Knight Bachelor in the 2009 New Year Honours "for services to Sport".
- 2009: Inducted to the University of Edinburgh's Sports Hall of Fame.
- 2009: Train operating company SouthEastern named a high-speed Class 395 train after him.
- 2009: The Edinburgh Award.
- 2012: The Sir Chris Hoy Velodrome, built for the Glasgow 2014 Commonwealth Games, is named in his honour.
- 2013: Honorary Group Captain RAFAC, Ambassador to the Royal Air Force Air Cadets.
- 23 August 2013: Freedom of the City of Edinburgh.
- 26 June 2025: Freedom of the City of London.

== Bibliography ==
=== Non-fiction ===
- Chris Hoy: The Autobiography (2009, HarperCollins) ISBN 9780007311316
- Hoy, Chris (2 October 2018), How to Ride a Bike : From Starting Out to Peak Performance, Hamlyn, an imprint of Octopus Publishing, ISBN 978-0-600-63521-5
- Be Amazing! An Inspiring Guide to Being Your Own Champion (2020) ISBN 9781406394733
- All That Matters (2024, Hodder & Stoughton) ISBN 9781399741842

=== Children's fiction ===
==== Flying Fergus series ====
1. The Best Birthday Bike (2016)
2. The Great Cycle Challenge (2016, Bonnier Publishing Fiction); ISBN 9781848125629
3. The Big Biscuit Bike Off (2016)
4. The Championship Cheats (2017)
5. The Winning Team (2017)
6. The Cycle Search and Rescue (2017)
7. The Wreck-It-Race (2017)
8. Trouble on the Track (2018)
9. The Secret Cycle Scoop (2018)
10. The Photo Finish (2019)

== See also ==
- List of multiple Olympic gold medalists
- 2012 Summer Olympics and Paralympics gold post boxes
- City of Edinburgh Racing Club
- Achievements of members of City of Edinburgh Racing Club
- Commonwealth Arena and Sir Chris Hoy Velodrome

Olympic Games
Preceded by Mark Foster	Flagbearer for Great Britain; London 2012	Succeeded by Andy Murray
Sporting positions
Preceded by Inaugural	European Le Mans Series; LMP3 Champion; 2015; With: Charlie Robertson	Succeeded by Alex Brundle; Mike Guasch; Christian England
