= Valerio Catellini =

Italian cyclist (born 1991)

Personal information
- Born: 6 April 1991 (age 35)

Cycling career
- Sport: Cycling
- Discipline: Track cycling
- Role: Rider
- Rider type: sprinter

Valerio Catellini (born 6 April 1991) is an Italian male track cyclist, riding for the national team. He competed in the team sprint event at the 2010 UCI Track Cycling World Championships.
