= Hodei Mazquiarán Uría =

Spanish cyclist

Hodei Mazquiaran (born 16 December 1988, Alsasua, Spain) is a Spanish track cyclist. At the 2012 Summer Olympics, he competed in the Men's sprint.
