= Francesco Ceci =

Italian cyclist (born 1989)

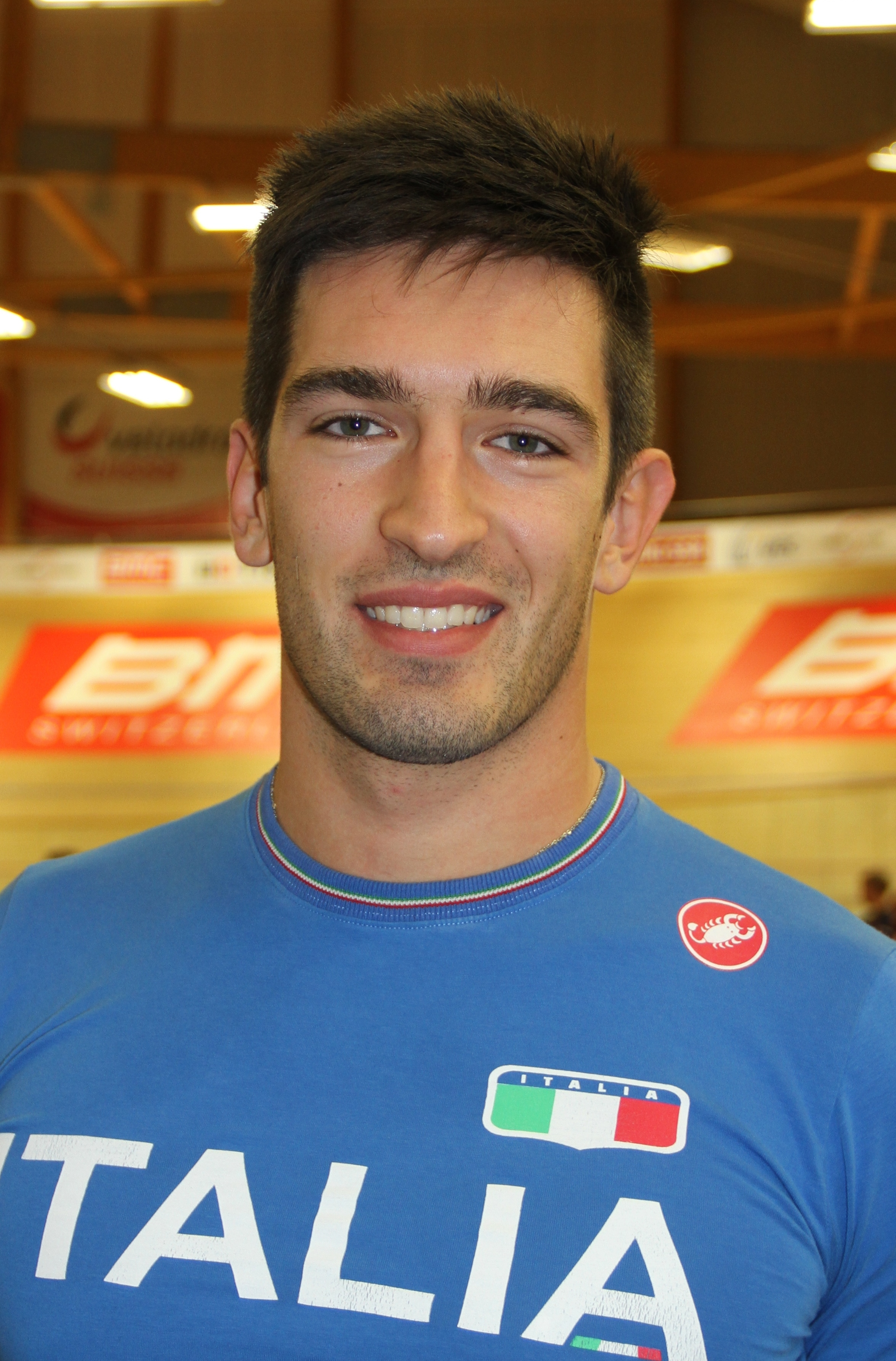
- Francesco Ceci in 2015

Personal information
- Born: 18 December 1989 (age 36)

Cycling career
- Sport: Cycling
- Role: Rider

Amateur team
- Fiamme Azzurre
Medal record
Men's para-cycling
Representing Italy
Track World Championships
Silver medal – second place	2025 Rio de Janeiro	Mixed team sprint B
Bronze medal – third place	2025 Rio de Janeiro	Tandem B kilo

Francesco Ceci (born 18 December 1989) is an Italian professional racing cyclist. He rode at the 2015 UCI Track Cycling World Championships.
