= Zafeiris Volikakis =

Greek cyclist (born 1989)

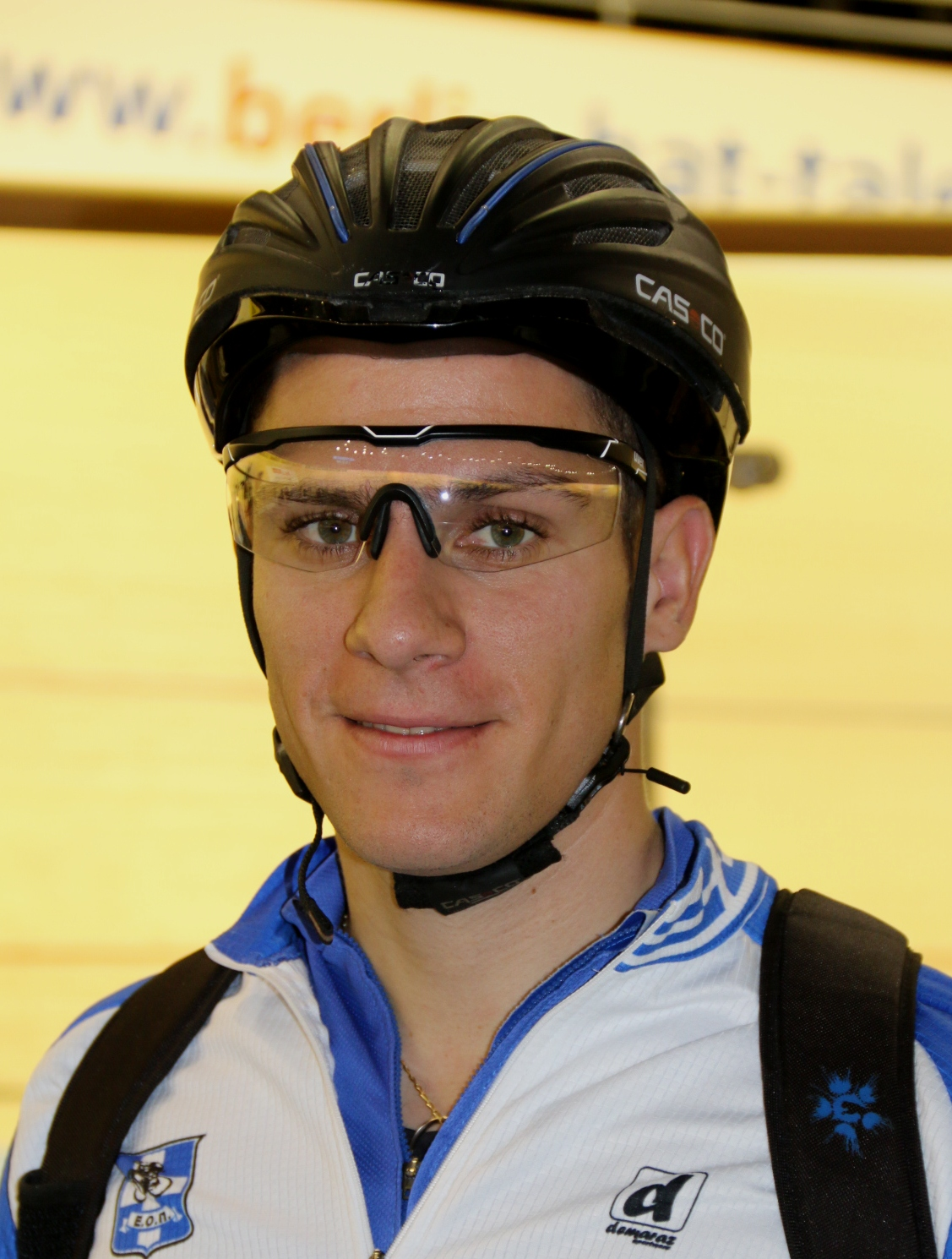
- Zafeiris Volikakis (2017)

Personal information
- Full name: Zafeiris Volikakis
- Nationality: Greek
- Born: 20 June 1989 (age 37) Volos, Greece

Sport
- Country: Greece
- Sport: Track cycling
- Event(s): Sprint, Keirin, Team sprint
- Team: HERAKLION KASTRO – MURCIA TEAM
Medal record
Representing Greece
Men's track cycling
UCI Juniors Track Cycling World Championships
Bronze medal – third place	2006 Gent	TeamSprint
European Track Cycling Championships
Silver medal – second place	2006 Athens(Juniors)	TeamSprint
- Updated on 25 November 2011

Zafeiris Volikakis (born 20 June 1989 in Volos) is a Greek track cyclist who represented Greece at the 2012 Summer Olympics, along with his brother Christos Volikakis.

== Career highlights ==
=== Greek Championship ===
1. 2005 1st in National Championship, Track, Sprint, Novices, Greece (GRE)
2. 2005 1st in National Championship, Track, 500 m, Novices, Greece (GRE)
3. 2006 1st in National Championship, Track, Team Sprint, Juniors, Greece (GRE) + Christos Volikakis, Nikolaos Dimotakis,
4. 2006 1st in National Championship, Track, Sprint, Juniors, Greece (GRE)
5. 2007 1st in National Championship, Track, Team Sprint, Juniors, Greece (GRE) + Sotirios Bretas, Dimitris Voukelatos,
6. 2007 1st in National Championship, Track, Team Sprint, Elite, Greece (GRE) + Christos Volikakis, Vasileios Galanis,
7. 2007 1st in National Championship, Track, 1 km, Juniors, Greece (GRE)
8. 2007 1st in National Championship, Track, Keirin, Juniors, Greece (GRE)
9. 2007 1st in National Championship, Track, Sprint, Juniors, Greece (GRE)
10. 2009 2nd in National Championship, Track, Keirin, Elite, Greece, Athens (GRE)
11. 2011 3rd in National Championship, Track, Keirin, Elite, Greece (GRE)
12. 2011 1st in National Championship, Track, Team Sprint, Elite, Greece (GRE) + Georgios Bouglas, Christos Volikakis,

=== Balkan Open ===
1. 2007 3rd in Athens Open Balkan Championship, Track, Team Sprint, Elite/U23, Greece, Athens (GRE)
2. 2007 1st in Athens Open Balkan Championship, Track, Keirin, Juniors, Greece, Athens (GRE)
3. 2007 1st in Athens Open Balkan Championship, Track, Sprint, Juniors, Greece, Athens (GRE)

=== European Championship ===
1. 2006 2nd in European Championship, Track, Team Sprint, Juniors, Athens

=== World Grand Prix ===
1. 2011 3rd in Moscou, Keirin (RUS)

=== World Championships ===
1. 2006 3rd in World Championship, Track, Team Sprint, Juniors, Gent
2. 2010 13th in World Championship, Track, Team Sprint, Elite, København
3. 2010 17th in World Championship, Track, Keirin, Elite, København
