= Denis Špička =

Czech cyclist

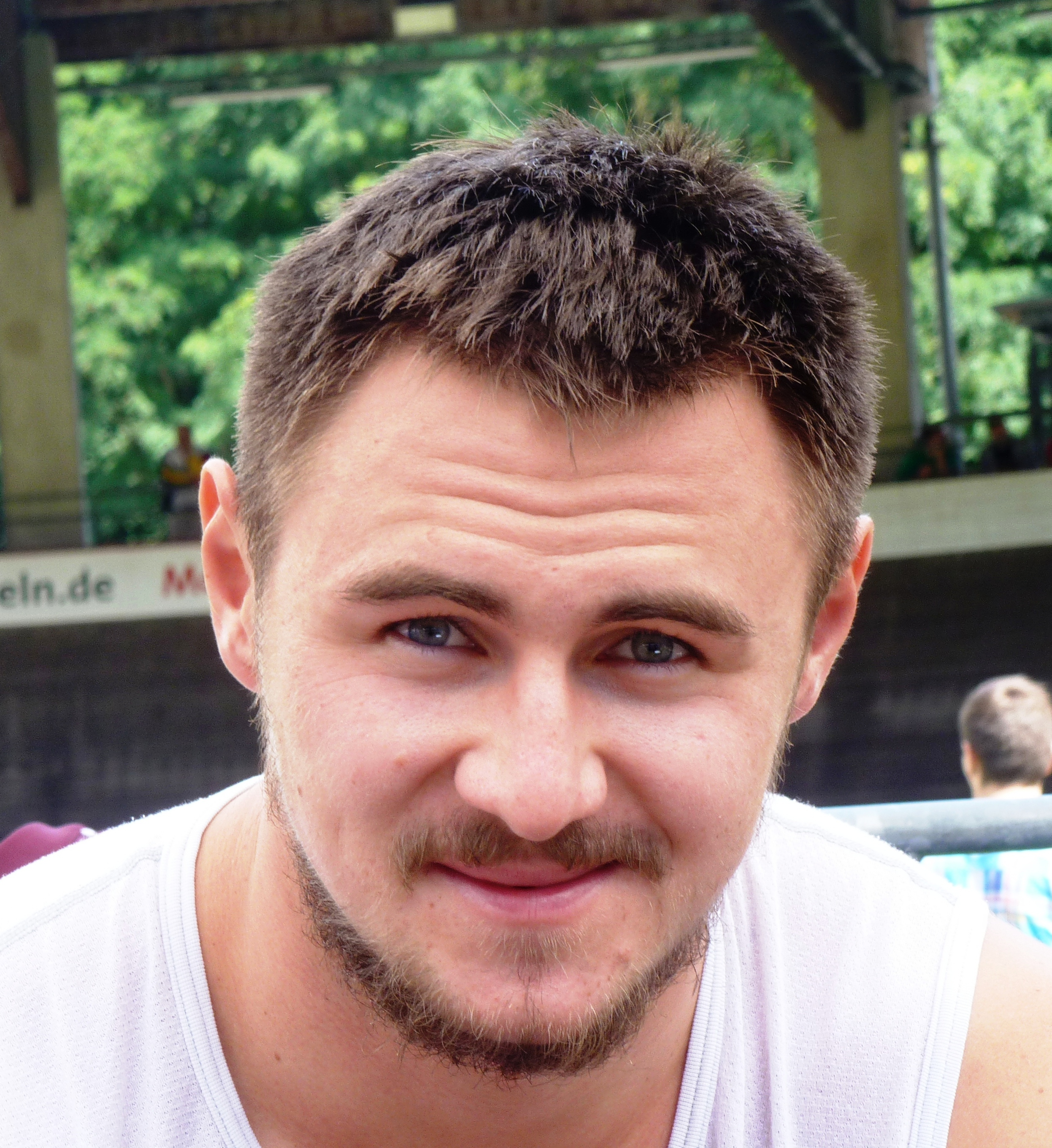

Denis Špička (born 29 August 1988 in Ústí nad Orlicí) is a Czech cyclist. He competed in the keirin and men's team sprint at the 2008 Summer Olympics (finishing 13th and 11th respectively), and the keirin race at the 2012 Summer Olympics, where he placed 17th.
