= 2009–10 UCI Track Cycling World Ranking =

The 2009–10 UCI Track Cycling World Ranking is an overview of the UCI Track Cycling World Ranking, based upon the results in all UCI-sanctioned track cycling races of the 2009–10 track cycling season.

== Summary ==
Discipline	Men's Ranking		Women's Ranking	
Discipline	Top-ranked individual	Top-ranked nation	Top-ranked individual	Top-ranked nation
Individual pursuit	Vitaliy Shchedov (UKR)	Ukraine	Vilija Sereikaitė (LTU)	Lithuania
Points race	Cameron Meyer (AUS)	Australia	Giorgia Bronzini (ITA)	Italy
Scratch	Lukasz Bujko (POL)	New Zealand	Evgenia Romanyuta (RUS)	Russia
Sprint	Kévin Sireau (FRA)	France	Shuang Guo (CHN)	Australia
Time trial	Michaël D'Almeida (FRA)	France	Anna Meares (AUS)	Australia
Keirin	Maximilian Levy (GER)	Germany	Simona Krupeckaitė (LTU)	Australia
Team pursuit	Michael Hepburn (AUS)	Australia	Josephine Tomic (AUS)	Australia
Team sprint	Robert Förstemann (GER)	Germany	Anna Meares (AUS)	Australia
Madison	Angelo Ciccone (ITA)	Germany	—	

== Individual pursuit ==
=== Men's individual ===
	Cyclists	Nation	Points
1	Vitaliy Shchedov	Ukraine	1,090
2	Jesse Sergent	New Zealand	790
3	Valery Kaikov	Russia	605
4	Taylor Phinney	United States	570
5	Rohan Dennis	Australia	535
6	Vitaliy Popkov	Ukraine	495
7	Geraint Thomas	Great Britain	400
8	Alexander Serov	Russia	380
9	Juan Esteban Arango	Colombia	360
10	Jack Bobridge	Australia	340
11	Gediminas Bagdonas	Lithuania	340
12	Dominique Cornu	Belgium	330
13	Westley Gough	New Zealand	300
14	Michael Hepburn	Australia	295
15	Artur Ershov	Russia	290
16	Levi Heimans	Netherlands	280
17	Marco Coledan	Italy	260
18	Stefan Schäfer	Germany	260
19	Arno van der Zwet	Netherlands	250
20	Chun Kai Feng	Chinese Taipei	245

=== Men's nation ===
	Nation	Points
1	Ukraine	1,683
2	New Zealand	1,375
3	Russia	1,347
4	Australia	1,230
5	Great Britain	760
6	United States	660
7	Colombia	640
8	Belgium	610
9	Netherlands	602
10	Germany	567
11	Spain	485
12	Poland	448
13	Denmark	420
14	Lithuania	383
15	China	380
16	Switzerland	361
17	Italy	341
18	France	274
19	Chinese Taipei	245
20	Hong Kong	230

=== Women's individual ===
	Cyclists	Nation	Points
1	Vilija Sereikaitė	Lithuania	1,090
2	Alison Shanks	New Zealand	1,050
3	Wendy Houvenaghel	Great Britain	920
4	Sarah Hammer	United States	870
5	Tara Whitten	Canada	840
6	Lesya Kalytovska	Ukraine	630
7	Aušrinė Trebaitė	Lithuania	550
8	Vera Koedooder	Netherlands	535
9	Josephine Tomic	Australia	500
10	Elissavet Chantzi	Greece	398
11	Pascale Schnider	Switzerland	390
12	Ellen van Dijk	Netherlands	360
13	Dalila Rodríguez Hernandez	Cuba	360
14	Sarah Kent	Australia	310
15	Lada Kozlíková	Czech Republic	283
16	Jaime Nielsen	New Zealand	235
17	Ah Reum Na	Korea	220
18	Leire Olaberria	Spain	220
19	Nontasin Chanpeng	Thailand	218
20	Satomi Wadami	Japan	215

=== Women's nation ===
	Nation	Points
1	Lithuania	1,810
2	New Zealand	1,640
3	Great Britain	1,179
4	United States	1,060
5	Australia	1,033
6	Netherlands	995
7	Canada	930
8	Ukraine	920
9	Germany	693
10	Cuba	470
11	Greece	417
12	Czech Republic	393
13	Switzerland	390
14	China	360
15	Korea	330
16	Spain	302
17	Japan	269
18	Poland	265
19	Russia	240
20	Thailand	218

== Points race ==
=== Men's individual ===
	Cyclists	Nation	Points
1	Cameron Meyer	Australia	840
2	Chris Newton	Great Britain	780
3	Ho Ting Kwok	Hong Kong	730
4	Zachary Bell	Canada	610
5	Ioannis Tamouridis	Greece	600
6	Lukasz Bujko	Poland	563
7	Artur Ershov	Russia	518
8	Milan Kadlec	Czech Republic	500
9	Angelo Ciccone	Italy	498
10	Peter Schep	Netherlands	488
11	Thomas Scully	New Zealand	470
12	Kazuhiro Mori	Japan	470
13	Roger Kluge	Germany	435
14	Walter Pérez	Argentina	340
15	Andreas Müller	Austria	327
16	Morgan Kneisky	France	274
17	Ingmar De Poortere	Belgium	270
18	Iljo Keisse	Belgium	260
19	Marcel Barth	Germany	235
20	Michael Freiberg	Australia	220

=== Men's nation ===
	Nation	Points
1	Australia	1,255
2	Great Britain	1,035
3	Hong Kong	1,013
4	New Zealand	867
5	Poland	847
6	Germany	841
7	Canada	795
8	Czech Republic	776
9	Japan	724
10	Greece	672
11	Italy	666.5
12	Belgium	665
13	Russia	652
14	Netherlands	613.5
15	France	529
16	Austria	471
17	Colombia	460
18	Spain	409
19	Argentina	406
20	Switzerland	341

=== Women's individual ===
	Cyclists	Nation	Points
1	Giorgia Bronzini	Italy	1,100
2	Tara Whitten	Canada	1,010
3	Tatsiana Sharakova	Belarus	760
4	Yumari González	Cuba	610
5	Leire Olaberria	Spain	520
6	Lizzie Armitstead	Great Britain	520
7	Elena Tchalykh	Azerbaijan	480
8	Jarmila Machačová	Czech Republic	465
9	Megan Dunn	Australia	460
10	Belinda Goss	Australia	420
11	Evgenia Romanyuta	Russia	403
12	Shelley Olds	United States	380
13	Joanne Kiesanowski	New Zealand	356
14	Lauren Ellis	New Zealand	345
15	Paola Muñoz	Chile	340
16	Andrea Wölfer	Switzerland	340
17	Aušrinė Trebaitė	Lithuania	330
18	Lang Meng	China	310
19	Nontasin Chanpeng	Thailand	284
20	Madeleine Sandig	Germany	268

=== Women's nation ===
	Nation	Points
1	Italy	1,563
2	Australia	1,107
3	Canada	1,075
4	New Zealand	949
5	Belarus	818
6	Great Britain	713
7	Germany	699
8	Russia	695
9	Cuba	660
10	Czech Republic	617
11	Spain	615
12	United States	565
13	Netherlands	494
14	China	490
15	Azerbaijan	480
16	Switzerland	478
17	Lithuania	402
18	Chile	365
19	Thailand	338
20	Mexico	273

== Scratch ==
=== Men's individual ===
	Cyclists	Nation	Points
1	Lukasz Bujko	Poland	729
2	Thomas Scully	New Zealand	650
3	Elia Viviani	Italy	553
4	Kazuhiro Mori	Japan	530
5	Chris Newton	Great Britain	530
6	Alex Rasmussen	Denmark	500
7	Ángel Dario Colla	Argentina	470
8	Zachary Bell	Canada	400
9	Erik Mohs	Germany	380
10	Ivan Kovalev	Russia	372
11	Juan Esteban Arango	Colombia	320
12	Matthew Brammeier	Ireland	320
13	Martin Bláha	Czech Republic	301
14	Morgan Kneisky	France	295
15	Werner Riebenbauer	Austria	290
16	James Carney	United States	280
17	Viktor Shmalko	Russia	271
18	Scott Law	Australia	270
19	Hayden Godfrey	New Zealand	260
20	Andreas Müller	Austria	260

=== Men's nation ===
	Nation	Points
1	New Zealand	1,166
2	Poland	1,024
3	Italy	841.5
4	Russia	813
5	Great Britain	764
6	Japan	700
7	Colombia	683
8	Czech Republic	635
9	Austria	617
10	United States	615
11	Australia	597
12	Germany	583
13	France	551
14	Hong Kong	540
15	Argentina	536
16	Denmark	520
17	Canada	504
18	Ukraine	473
19	Belgium	473
20	Switzerland	429.5

=== Women's individual ===
	Cyclists	Nation	Points
1	Evgenia Romanyuta	Russia	995
2	Pascale Jeuland	France	844
3	Giorgia Bronzini	Italy	785
4	Belinda Goss	Australia	760
5	Yumari González	Cuba	720
6	Vera Koedooder	Netherlands	551
7	Jarmila Machačová	Czech Republic	533
8	Joanne Kiesanowski	New Zealand	525
9	Tatsiana Sharakova	Belarus	460
10	Xiao Juan Diao	Hong Kong	460
11	Shelley Olds	United States	430
12	Małgorzata Wojtyra	Poland	389
13	Kelly Druyts	Belgium	343
14	Lang Meng	China	310
15	Ah Reum Na	Korea	280
16	Aušrinė Trebaitė	Lithuania	273
17	Leire Olaberria	Spain	265
18	Paola Muñoz	Chile	260
19	Theresa Cliff-Ryan	United States	258
20	Monia Baccaille	Italy	245

=== Women's nation ===
	Nation	Points
1	Russia	1,346
2	Italy	1,280
3	Australia	1,138
4	New Zealand	1,001
5	United States	923
6	France	918
7	Cuba	793
8	Czech Republic	780
9	Netherlands	735
10	Hong Kong	660
11	Belarus	606
12	Poland	559
13	Great Britain	533
14	Spain	493
15	Belgium	428
16	Lithuania	360
17	Switzerland	353
18	China	350
19	Korea	300
20	Chile	276

== Sprint ==
=== Men's individual ===
	Cyclists	Nation	Points
1	Kévin Sireau	France	1,225
2	Shane Perkins	Australia	944
3	Matthew Crampton	Great Britain	755
4	Grégory Baugé	France	655
5	Maximilian Levy	Germany	638
6	Chris Hoy	Great Britain	604
7	Jason Kenny	Great Britain	588
8	Daniel Ellis	Australia	570
9	Robert Förstemann	Germany	565
10	Michaël D'Almeida	France	563
11	François Pervis	France	475
12	Edward Dawkins	New Zealand	444
13	Carsten Bergemann	Germany	425
14	Damian Zieliński	Poland	413
15	Travis Smith	Canada	378
16	Ross Edgar	Great Britain	375
17	Azizulhasni Awang	Malaysia	362
18	Denis Špička	Czech Republic	350
19	Zhang Lei	China	340
20	Tomáš Bábek	Czech Republic	335

=== Men's nation ===
	Nation	Points
1	France	2,918
2	Great Britain	2,322
3	Australia	1,948
4	Germany	1,934
5	Czech Republic	1,010
6	Poland	983
7	New Zealand	884
8	China	683
9	Japan	600
10	Malaysia	589
11	Russia	529
12	Canada	427
13	Colombia	420
14	Greece	413
15	Netherlands	383
16	Iran	238
17	Ukraine	224
18	United States	217
19	Spain	182
20	Italy	174

=== Women's individual ===
	Cyclists	Nation	Points
1	Shuang Guo	China	1,140
2	Simona Krupeckaitė	Lithuania	1,018
3	Willy Kanis	Netherlands	1,004
4	Anna Meares	Australia	980
5	Victoria Pendleton	Great Britain	900
6	Kaarle McCulloch	Australia	630
7	Clara Sanchez	France	560
8	Emily Rosemond	Australia	440
9	Jinjie Gong	China	420
10	Lisandra Guerra	Cuba	420
11	Olga Streltsova	Russia	410
12	Christin Muche	Germany	390
13	Lyubov Shulika	Ukraine	380
14	Jessica Varnish	Great Britain	375
15	Yvonne Hijgenaar	Netherlands	373
16	Virginie Cueff	France	370
17	Olga Panarina	Belarus	340
18	Miriam Welte	Germany	312
19	Diana García	Colombia	310
20	Victoria Baranova	Russia	267

=== Women's nation ===
	Nation	Points
1	Australia	2,220
2	China	1,990
3	Netherlands	1,532
4	Great Britain	1,492
5	Lithuania	1,287
6	France	1,226
7	Germany	1,111
8	Russia	806
9	Ukraine	440
10	Cuba	430
11	Belarus	346
12	Colombia	320
13	Spain	294
14	Poland	289
15	Hong Kong	274
16	Chinese Taipei	256
17	New Zealand	242
18	United States	224
19	Greece	179
20	Japan	151

== Time trial ==
=== Men's individual ===
	Cyclists	Nation	Points
1	Michaël D'Almeida	France	814
2	Teun Mulder	Netherlands	790
3	Tomáš Bábek	Czech Republic	764
4	Scott Sunderland	Australia	700
5	Chongyang Wang	China	670
6	David Daniell	Great Britain	630
7	François Pervis	France	600
8	Edward Dawkins	New Zealand	590
9	Yevhen Bolibrukh	Ukraine	540
10	Stefan Nimke	Germany	520
11	Zhang Miao	China	480
12	Kamil Kuczyński	Poland	460
13	Yudai Nitta	Japan	450
14	Joachim Eilers	Germany	402
15	Clemens Selzer	Austria	350
16	Quentin Lafargue	France	315
17	Adrian Tekliński	Poland	301
18	Francesco Ceci	Italy	285
19	David Alonso Castillo	Spain	270
20	Giddeon Massie	United States	250

=== Men's nation ===
	Nation	Points
1	France	1,977
2	China	1,320
3	Germany	1,242
4	Australia	1,175
5	Czech Republic	1,042
6	New Zealand	888
7	Netherlands	884
8	Poland	816
9	Great Britain	760
10	Ukraine	758
11	Japan	650
12	United States	485
13	Italy	391
14	Austria	378
15	Spain	328
16	Colombia	320
17	Russia	232
18	Malaysia	230
19	Hong Kong	210
20	Canada	208

=== Women's individual ===
	Cyclists	Nation	Points
1	Anna Meares	Australia	1,320
2	Willy Kanis	Netherlands	1,100
3	Simona Krupeckaitė	Lithuania	900
4	Sandie Clair	France	850
5	Kaarle McCulloch	Australia	720
6	Jinjie Gong	China	710
7	Wai Sze Lee	Hong Kong	710
8	Olga Panarina	Belarus	540
9	Lisandra Guerra	Cuba	510
10	Jessica Varnish	Great Britain	505
11	Miriam Welte	Germany	490
12	Renata Dąbrowska	Poland	390
13	Helena Casas Roige	Spain	336
14	Victoria Pendleton	Great Britain	330
15	Diana García	Colombia	310
16	Vilija Sereikaitė	Lithuania	305
17	Virginie Cueff	France	300
18	Lin Junhong	China	280
19	Monique Sullivan	Canada	256
20	Annette Edmondson	Australia	245

=== Women's nation ===
	Nation	Points
1	Australia	2,415
2	Lithuania	1,454
3	Netherlands	1,420
4	France	1,280
5	China	1,190
6	Great Britain	927
7	Germany	805
8	Hong Kong	750
9	Poland	658
10	Belarus	550
11	Cuba	510
12	Russia	396
13	Spain	365
14	Colombia	340
15	Canada	279
16	Italy	274
17	Chinese Taipei	233
18	Malaysia	230
19	New Zealand	206
20	Greece	172

== Keirin ==
=== Men's individual ===
	Cyclists	Nation	Points
1	Maximilian Levy	Germany	1,202
2	Azizulhasni Awang	Malaysia	1,058
3	Chris Hoy	Great Britain	940
4	Christos Volikakis	Greece	670
5	Jason Niblett	Australia	564
6	Teun Mulder	Netherlands	550
7	Simon van Velthooven	New Zealand	528
8	Sam Webster	New Zealand	464
9	Shane Perkins	Australia	458
10	Denis Špička	Czech Republic	426
11	Andriy Vynokurov	Ukraine	412
12	François Pervis	France	384
13	Carsten Bergemann	Germany	373
14	Daniel Ellis	Australia	365
15	Josiah Ng Onn Lam	Malaysia	360
16	Michaël D'Almeida	France	345
17	Jason Kenny	Great Britain	344
18	Francesco Ceci	Italy	282
19	Sebastian Doehrer	Germany	280
20	René Enders	Germany	260

=== Men's nation ===
	Nation	Points
1	Germany	2,115
2	Great Britain	1,679
3	Malaysia	1,658
4	Australia	1,618
5	New Zealand	1,219
6	Greece	1,063
7	France	991
8	Netherlands	898
9	Czech Republic	838
10	Japan	685
11	Ukraine	525
12	Poland	414
13	Colombia	390
14	China	360
15	Italy	343
16	Russia	323
17	Spain	228
18	United States	218
19	South Africa	215
20	Canada	214

=== Women's individual ===
	Cyclists	Nation	Points
1	Simona Krupeckaitė	Lithuania	1,094
2	Shuang Guo	China	960
3	Miriam Welte	Germany	708
4	Anna Meares	Australia	700
5	Christin Muche	Germany	680
6	Emily Rosemond	Australia	650
7	Kaarle McCulloch	Australia	570
8	Victoria Pendleton	Great Britain	550
9	Olga Panarina	Belarus	540
10	Clara Sanchez	France	515
11	Agnes Ronner	Netherlands	515
12	Wai Sze Lee	Hong Kong	490
13	Willy Kanis	Netherlands	424
14	Monique Sullivan	Canada	395
15	Diana García	Colombia	350
16	Lisandra Guerra	Cuba	340
17	Jessica Varnish	Great Britain	320
18	Olga Streltsova	Russia	310
19	Sandie Clair	France	285
20	Renata Dąbrowska	Poland	282

=== Women's nation ===
	Nation	Points
1	Australia	2,105
2	Germany	1,811
3	Lithuania	1,332
4	China	1,190
5	Netherlands	1,092
6	France	963
7	Great Britain	957
8	Hong Kong	556
9	Belarus	540
10	Russia	470
11	Colombia	430
12	Canada	419
13	Poland	390
14	Cuba	340
15	Italy	334
16	New Zealand	276
17	United States	254
18	Chinese Taipei	237
19	Japan	231
20	Spain	224

== Team pursuit ==
=== Men's individual ===
	Cyclists	Nation	Points
1	Michael Hepburn	Australia	550
2	Rohan Dennis	Australia	450
3	Andrew Tennant	Great Britain	440
3	Steven Burke	Great Britain	440
3	Edward Clancy	Great Britain	440
6	Cameron Meyer	Australia	437.5
7	Vitaliy Shchedov	Ukraine	400
8	Maksym Polischuk	Ukraine	385
9	Levi Heimans	Netherlands	360
10	Valery Kaikov	Russia	345
10	Artur Ershov	Russia	345
12	Luke Durbridge	Australia	337.5
13	Sergi Escobar Roure	Spain	320
14	Peter Latham	New Zealand	315
14	Sam Bewley	New Zealand	315
16	Jack Bobridge	Australia	300
17	Tim Veldt	Netherlands	300
17	Sipke Zijlstra	Netherlands	300
19	Rasmus Christian Quaade	Denmark	290
20	Michael Faerk Christensen	Denmark	280

=== Men's nation ===
	Nation	Points
1	Australia	2,075
2	Great Britain	1,675
3	Ukraine	1,372.5
4	Netherlands	1,320
5	New Zealand	1,260
6	Russia	1,155
7	Denmark	1,070
8	Spain	1,064
9	Poland	899
10	France	889
11	Germany	837.5
12	China	730
13	Colombia	685
14	Greece	551.5
15	Kazakhstan	528
16	Italy	397
17	Belgium	395
18	Iran	372.5
19	Ireland	371.5
20	Switzerland	364.5

=== Women's individual ===
	Cyclists	Nation	Points
1	Josephine Tomic	Australia	670
2	Sarah Kent	Australia	560
3	Ashlee Ankudinoff	Australia	510
4	Lauren Ellis	New Zealand	485
5	Joanna Rowsell	Great Britain	440
5	Wendy Houvenaghel	Great Britain	440
7	Laura Brown	Canada	410
7	Tara Whitten	Canada	410
9	Alison Shanks	New Zealand	400
10	Stephanie Roorda	Canada	355
11	Lisa Brennauer	Germany	345
12	Lizzie Armitstead	Great Britain	310
13	Kelly Druyts	Belgium	310
13	Jessie Daams	Belgium	310
13	Jolien D'Hoore	Belgium	310
16	Lauren Tamayo	United States	280
17	Lesya Kalytovska	Ukraine	280
18	Aušrinė Trebaitė	Lithuania	270
19	Rushlee Buchanan	New Zealand	255
20	Ellen van Dijk	Netherlands	250

=== Women's nation ===
	Nation	Points
1	Australia	1,887.5
2	New Zealand	1,385
3	Great Britain	1,320
4	Canada	1,234
5	Belgium	947.5
6	Germany	845
7	Netherlands	840
8	United States	815
9	Ukraine	790
10	Lithuania	772
11	Russia	645
12	France	645
13	Cuba	525
14	Italy	512.5
15	China	395
16	Colombia	370
17	Poland	365
18	Mexico	255
19	Thailand	195
20	Indonesia	165

== Team sprint ==
=== Men's individual ===
	Cyclists	Nation	Points
1	Robert Förstemann	Germany	572
2	Daniel Ellis	Australia	555
3	Denis Dmitriev	Russia	532.5
3	Sergey Borisov	Russia	532.5
3	Sergey Kucherov	Russia	532.5
6	Maximilian Levy	Germany	497
7	Kévin Sireau	France	465
8	Scott Sunderland	Australia	440
9	Stefan Nimke	Germany	417.5
10	Michaël D'Almeida	France	394
11	Jason Kenny	Great Britain	375
12	Edward Dawkins	New Zealand	345
13	Teun Mulder	Netherlands	335
14	Tobias Wachter	Germany	332
15	Chris Hoy	Great Britain	320
16	Zhang Lei	China	320
17	Adam Stewart	New Zealand	315
18	Maciej Bielecki	Poland	302
19	Jason Niblett	Australia	300
20	Shane Perkins	Australia	280

=== Men's nation ===
	Nation	Points
1	Germany	1,818.5
2	Russia	1,742
3	Australia	1,575
4	France	1,379
5	Great Britain	1,207.5
6	New Zealand	1,090
7	Poland	1,037
8	China	910
9	Canada	722
10	Netherlands	640
11	Japan	595
12	Ukraine	518.5
13	Greece	512.5
14	Colombia	415
15	Malaysia	367
16	Czech Republic	338.5
17	Spain	310
18	Iran	220
19	Chile	165
20	Brazil	135

=== Women's individual ===
	Cyclists	Nation	Points
1	Anna Meares	Australia	620
2	Willy Kanis	Netherlands	620
2	Yvonne Hijgenaar	Netherlands	620
4	Jinjie Gong	China	545
5	Lin Junhong	China	460
6	Kaarle McCulloch	Australia	450
7	Victoria Baranova	Russia	384
8	Olga Streltsova	Russia	375
9	Simona Krupeckaitė	Lithuania	355
10	Sandie Clair	France	355
11	Gintarė Gaivenytė	Lithuania	337.5
12	Emily Rosemond	Australia	305
13	Miriam Welte	Germany	290
14	Angeliki Koutsonikoli	Greece	251.5
15	Wai Sze Lee	Hong Kong	237.5
15	Zhao Juan Meng	Hong Kong	237.5
17	Jessica Varnish	Great Britain	235
18	Renata Dąbrowska	Poland	227
19	Virginie Cueff	France	225
20	Eleni Klapanara	Greece	201.5

=== Women's nation ===
	Nation	Points
1	Australia	1,375
2	Netherlands	1,240
3	China	1,150
4	Russia	794
5	France	770
6	Lithuania	762.5
7	Germany	490
8	Hong Kong	475
9	Greece	458
10	Poland	454
11	Great Britain	435
12	Colombia	330
13	Mexico	300
14	Chinese Taipei	230
15	Korea	190
16	Thailand	187.5
17	Cuba	180
18	Canada	143
19	New Zealand	137
20	Japan	102.5

== Madison ==
=== Men's individual ===
	Cyclists	Nation	Points
1	Angelo Ciccone	Italy	482
2	Roger Kluge	Germany	430
3	Robert Bartko	Germany	417.5
4	Franco Marvulli	Switzerland	416.5
5	Leigh Howard	Australia	406
6	Thomas Scully	New Zealand	385
7	Morgan Kneisky	France	375
8	Michael Mørkøv	Denmark	342.5
9	Ho Ting Kwok	Hong Kong	340
10	Alexey Shmidt	Russia	326
11	Sergey Kolesnikov	Russia	320.5
12	Steve Schets	Belgium	304.5
13	Cameron Meyer	Australia	300
14	Danny Stam	Netherlands	273.5
15	Alex Rasmussen	Denmark	262.5
16	Alexander Äschbach	Switzerland	252.5
17	Elia Viviani	Italy	250.5
18	Christophe Riblon	France	250
19	Tristan Marguet	Switzerland	237
20	Iljo Keisse	Belgium	232.5

=== Men's nation ===
	Nation	Points
1	Germany	1,042
2	Switzerland	906
3	Italy	894.5
4	Russia	873.5
5	France	835.5
6	Australia	830
7	Denmark	770
8	Belgium	749
9	New Zealand	721
10	Hong Kong	625
11	Netherlands	592.5
12	Austria	514
13	Czech Republic	437.5
14	Spain	403.5
15	Argentina	386.5
16	Poland	382
17	United States	368
18	Great Britain	317.5
19	Ukraine	291.5
20	Colombia	226.5

== See also ==
- 2009 UCI Women's Road World Rankings
- 2010 UCI Women's Road World Rankings

Preceded by 2008–09	UCI Track Cycling World Ranking; 2009–10	Succeeded by 2010–11
