= 2010 UCI Track Cycling World Championships – Men's sprint =

2010 UCI Track Cycling World Championship

Men's sprint at the 2010 UCI Track Cycling World Championships
- Venue: Ballerup Super Arena, Ballerup, Denmark
- Date: 27–28 March 2010
- Competitors: 46 from 20 nations

Medalists
gold medal	Grégory Baugé	France
silver medal	Shane Perkins	Australia
bronze medal	Kévin Sireau	France

Rainbow jersey

The Men's Sprint was one of the 10 men's events at the 2010 UCI Track Cycling World Championships, held in Ballerup, Denmark.

46 cyclists from 20 countries participated in the contest. After the qualifying heats, the fastest 24 riders were to advance to the 1/16 finals.

The first rider in each of the 12 heats advanced to the second round. There was no repechage for this round.

The first rider from each of the six Second Round heats advanced to the Quarterfinals and the second placed riders from a repechage to determine the other two riders that competed the quarterfinals.

The first rider in each quarterfinal advanced to the semifinals and the 4 losing athletes faced a race for 5th-8th place.

The qualifying, first round, second round, second round repechages and quarterfinals took place on 27 March. The Semifinals and Finals took place on 28 March.

== World record ==
World Record
WR	9.572	Kévin Sireau (FRA)	Moscow (Russia)	30 May 2009

== Results ==
=== Qualifying ===
Rank	Name	Nation	Time	Notes
1	Grégory Baugé	France	9.896	Q
2	Chris Hoy	Great Britain	9.913	Q
3	Shane Perkins	Australia	9.948	Q
4	Kévin Sireau	France	9.953	Q
5	Michaël D'Almeida	France	10.004	Q
6	François Pervis	France	10.023	Q
7	Matthew Crampton	Great Britain	10.037	Q
8	Jason Kenny	Great Britain	10.073	Q
9	Edward Dawkins	New Zealand	10.109	Q
10	Zhang Miao	China	10.132	Q
11	Robert Förstemann	Germany	10.142	Q
12	Maximilian Levy	Germany	10.185	Q
13	Zhang Lei	China	10.192	Q
14	Jason Niblett	Australia	10.193	Q
15	Carsten Bergemann	Germany	10.198	Q
16	Scott Sunderland	Australia	10.218	Q
17	Dan Ellis	Australia	10.241	Q
18	Andriy Vynokurov	Ukraine	10.244	Q
19	Sam Webster	New Zealand	10.251	Q
20	Azizulhasni Awang	Malaysia	10.264	Q
21	Josiah Ng	Malaysia	10.278	Q
22	Denis Dmitriev	Russia	10.303	Q
23	Damian Zieliński	Poland	10.312	Q
24	Ethan Mitchell	New Zealand	10.322	Q
25	Roy van den Berg	Netherlands	10.342	
26	Travis Smith	Canada	10.354	
27	Kazunari Watanabe	Japan	10.362	
28	Sergey Kucherov	Russia	10.419	
29	Yudai Nitta	Japan	10.429	
30	Denis Špička	Czech Republic	10.453	
31	Bao Saifei	China	10.476	
32	Tomáš Bábek	Czech Republic	10.498	
33	Adam Ptáčník	Czech Republic	10.515	
34	Pavel Yakushevskiy	Russia	10.522	
35	Adrian Tekliński	Poland	10.534	
36	Christos Volikakis	Greece	10.536	
37	David Alonso Castillo	Spain	10.600	
38	Yondi Schmidt	Netherlands	10.602	
39	Kota Asai	Japan	10.611	
40	Giddeon Massie	United States	10.619	
41	Luca Ceci	Italy	10.629	
42	Vasileios Reppas	Greece	10.716	
43	Kasper Lindholm Jessen	Denmark	10.760	
44	Clemens Selzer	Austria	10.894	
45	Konstantinos Karageorgos	Greece	11.068	
	Charlie Conord	France	DNF	

=== 1/16 Finals ===
Heat	Rank	Name	Nation	Time	Notes
1	1	Grégory Baugé	France	10.662	Q
1	2	Ethan Mitchell	New Zealand		
2	1	Chris Hoy	Great Britain	10.670	Q
2	2	Damian Zieliński	Poland		
3	1	Shane Perkins	Australia	10.415	Q
3	2	Denis Dmitriev	Russia		
4	1	Kévin Sireau	France	10.450	Q
4	2	Josiah Ng	Malaysia		
5	1	Azizulhasni Awang	Malaysia	10.578	Q
5	2	Michaël D'Almeida	France		
6	1	François Pervis	France	10.620	Q
6	2	Sam Webster	New Zealand		
7	1	Matthew Crampton	Great Britain	10.563	Q
7	2	Andriy Vynokurov	Ukraine		
8	1	Jason Kenny	Great Britain	10.455	Q
8	2	Dan Ellis	Australia		
9	1	Scott Sunderland	Australia	10.706	Q
9	2	Edward Dawkins	New Zealand		
10	1	Carsten Bergemann	Germany	11.011	Q
10	2	Zhang Miao	China		
11	1	Robert Förstemann	Germany	10.677	Q
11	2	Jason Niblett	Australia		
12	1	Zhang Lei	China	11.813	Q
12	2	Maximilian Levy	Germany		REL

=== 1/8 Finals ===
Heat	Rank	Name	Nation	Time	Notes
1	1	Grégory Baugé	France	10.424	Q
1	2	Zhang Lei	China		
2	1	Robert Förstemann	Germany	12.180	Q
2	2	Chris Hoy	Great Britain		
3	1	Shane Perkins	Australia	10.430	Q
3	2	Carsten Bergemann	Germany		
4	1	Kévin Sireau	France	10.512	Q
4	2	Scott Sunderland	Australia		
5	1	Jason Kenny	Great Britain	10.196	Q
5	2	Azizulhasni Awang	Malaysia		
6	1	François Pervis	France	10.533	Q
6	2	Matthew Crampton	Great Britain		

=== 1/8 Finals Repechage ===
Heat	Rank	Name	Nation	Time	Notes
1	1	Matthew Crampton	Great Britain	10.714	Q
1	2	Scott Sunderland	Australia		
1	3	Zhang Lei	China		
2	1	Chris Hoy	Great Britain	10.795	Q
2	2	Azizulhasni Awang	Malaysia		
2	3	Carsten Bergemann	Germany		

=== Quarterfinals ===
Heat	Rank	Name	Nation	Race 1	Race 2	Decider	Notes
1	1	Grégory Baugé	France		10.750	10.704	Q
1	2	Chris Hoy	Great Britain	10.433			
2	1	Robert Förstemann	Germany		10.878	10.457	Q
2	2	Matthew Crampton	Great Britain	10.687			
3	1	Shane Perkins	Australia	10.433	10.437		Q
3	2	François Pervis	France				
4	1	Kévin Sireau	France	10.481	10.116		Q
4	2	Jason Kenny	Great Britain				

=== Race for 5th-8th Places ===
Rank	Name	Nation	Time
5	Matthew Crampton	Great Britain	10.619
6	Chris Hoy	Great Britain	
7	François Pervis	France	
8	Jason Kenny	Great Britain	

=== Semifinals ===
Heat	Rank	Name	Nation	Race 1	Race 2	Decider	Notes
1	1	Grégory Baugé	France		9.973	10.467	Q
1	2	Kévin Sireau	France	10.348			
2	1	Shane Perkins	Australia	10.348		10.719	Q
2	2	Robert Förstemann	Germany		10.381		

=== Finals ===
Rank	Name	Nation	Race 1	Race 2	Decider
Gold Medal Races
1st place, gold medalist(s)	Grégory Baugé	France	10.406	10.361	
2nd place, silver medalist(s)	Shane Perkins	Australia			
Bronze Medal Races
3rd place, bronze medalist(s)	Kévin Sireau	France	10.467	10.574	
4	Robert Förstemann	Germany			
