= 2008–09 UCI Track Cycling World Ranking =

The 2008–09 UCI Track Cycling World Ranking is an overview of the UCI Track Cycling World Ranking, based upon the results in all UCI-sanctioned track cycling races of the 2008–09 track cycling season.

== Summary ==
Discipline	Men's ranking		Women's ranking	
Discipline	Top-ranked individual	Top-ranked nation	Top-ranked individual	Top-ranked nation
Individual pursuit	Vitaliy Shchedov (UKR)	Russia	Vilija Sereikaitė (LTU)	Great Britain
Points race	Chris Newton (GBR)	Australia	Giorgia Bronzini (ITA)	Italy
Scratch	Morgan Kneisky (FRA)	Australia	Lizzie Armitstead (GBR)	Great Britain
Sprint	Kévin Sireau (FRA)	France	Victoria Pendleton (GBR)	Great Britain
Time trial	Michaël D'Almeida (FRA)	France	Simona Krupeckaitė (LTU)	China
Keirin	Azizulhasni Awang (MAS)	France	Willy Kanis (NED)	China
Team pursuit	Jens-Erik Madsen (DEN)	Denmark	Lizzie Armitstead (GBR)	Great Britain
Team sprint	Kévin Sireau (FRA)	France	Kaarle McCulloch (AUS)	Australia
Madison	Kenny De Ketele (BEL)	Belgium	—N/a	

== Individual pursuit ==
=== Men's individual ===
	Cyclists	Nation	Points
1	Vitaliy Shchedov	Ukraine	1,110
2	Taylor Phinney	United States	1,030
3	Valery Kaykov	Russia	1,020
4	Jack Bobridge	Australia	890
5	Alexei Markov	Russia	860
6	Sergi Escobar Roure	Spain	735
7	Volodymyr Diudia	Ukraine	600
8	David O'Loughlin	Ireland	590
9	Bradley Wiggins	Great Britain	500
10	Jesse Sergent	New Zealand	500
11	Edward Clancy	Great Britain	460
12	Eloy Teruel Rovira	Spain	395
13	Ingmar De Poortere	Belgium	385
14	Toni Tauler	Spain	380
15	Dominique Cornu	Belgium	360
16	Arno van der Zwet	Netherlands	341
17	Steven Burke	Great Britain	340
18	Hayden Roulston	New Zealand	320
19	Robert Bartko	Germany	300
20	Arles Castro	Colombia	280

=== Men's nation ===
	Nation	Points
1	Russia	2,145
2	Ukraine	1,875
3	Spain	1,655
4	Australia	1,476
5	Great Britain	1,420
6	United States	1,120
7	New Zealand	1,100
8	Belgium	848
9	Ireland	725
10	Netherlands	647
11	Germany	631
12	France	504
13	Colombia	350
14	Poland	344
15	Italy	337
16	Japan	222
17	Chinese Taipei	218
18	Kazakhstan	215
19	South Korea	210
20	Czech Republic	203

=== Women's individual ===
	Cyclists	Nation	Points
1	Vilija Sereikaitė	Lithuania	1,250
2	Joanna Rowsell	Great Britain	1,070
3	Alison Shanks	New Zealand	1,020
4	Wendy Houvenaghel	Great Britain	940
5	Tara Whitten	Canada	940
6	Josephine Tomic	Australia	890
7	Ellen van Dijk	Netherlands	860
8	Svitlana Halyuk	Ukraine	705
9	Charlotte Becker	Germany	590
10	Rebecca Romero	Great Britain	500
11	Lada Kozlíková	Czech Republic	430
12	María Luisa Calle	Colombia	420
13	Tatsiana Sharakova	Belarus	410
14	Leire Olaberria	Spain	400
15	Verena Joos	Germany	395
16	Dalila Rodríguez Hernandez	Cuba	380
17	Kimberly Geist	United States	360
18	Elena Chalykh	Russia	340
19	Tess Downing	Australia	330
20	Jolien D'Hoore	Belgium	310

=== Women's nation ===
	Nation	Points
1	Great Britain	2,610
2	Australia	1,565
3	Lithuania	1,495
4	New Zealand	1,240
5	Ukraine	1,105
6	Germany	1,065
7	Netherlands	1,005
8	Canada	1,002
9	United States	765
10	Czech Republic	715
11	Spain	709
12	Colombia	600
13	Russia	523
14	Belarus	496
15	Cuba	393
16	Belgium	334
17	Poland	326
18	China	290
19	Argentina	280
20	Thailand	255

== Points race ==
=== Men's individual ===
	Cyclists	Nation	Points
1	Chris Newton	Great Britain	1,250
2	Cameron Meyer	Australia	1,030
3	Eloy Teruel Rovira	Spain	835
4	Zachary Bell	Canada	820
5	Daniel Kreutzfeldt	Denmark	643
6	Kam-Po Wong	Hong Kong	610
7	Glenn O'Shea	Australia	570
8	Kazuhiro Mori	Japan	530
9	Milan Kadlec	Czech Republic	520
10	Joan Llaneras	Spain	500
11	Roger Kluge	Germany	488
12	Rafał Ratajczyk	Poland	480
13	Vasil Kiryienka	Belarus	400
14	Tristan Marquet	Switzerland	378
15	Morgan Kneisky	France	377
16	Ingmar De Poortere	Belgium	340
17	Elia Viviani	Italy	331
18	Colby Pearce	United States	330
19	Iljo Keisse	Belgium	320
20	Carlos Torrent Tarres	Spain	320

=== Men's nation ===
	Nation	Points
1	Australia	1,853
2	Spain	1,794
3	Great Britain	1,581
4	Canada	1,009
5	Germany	968
6	Hong Kong	956
7	Czech Republic	862
8	Japan	828
9	Belgium	778
10	Denmark	757
11	Poland	743
12	Russia	708
13	Switzerland	688.5
14	France	677
15	United States	555
16	Netherlands	543
17	Belarus	488
18	New Zealand	450
19	Italy	443
20	Colombia	400

=== Women's individual ===
	Cyclists	Nation	Points
1	Giorgia Bronzini	Italy	1,260
2	Leire Olaberria Dorronsoro	Spain	935
3	Belinda Goss	Australia	850
4	Lizzie Armitstead	Great Britain	800
5	Yumari González	Cuba	710
6	Jarmila Machačová	Czech Republic	674
7	Ellen van Dijk	Netherlands	620
8	Svetlana Pauliukaitė	Lithuania	528
9	Katie Colclough	Great Britain	528
10	Tara Whitten	Canada	520
11	Shelley Olds	United States	515
12	Marianne Vos	Netherlands	500
13	Yoanka González Perez	Cuba	490
14	Cui Wang	China	480
15	Jamie Wong	Hong Kong	480
16	Pascale Jeuland	France	380
17	Evgenia Romanyuta	Russia	363
18	Małgorzata Wojtyra	Poland	338
19	Elena Chalykh	Russia	310
20	Tess Downing	Australia	292

=== Women's nation ===
	Nation	Points
1	Italy	1,854
2	Great Britain	1,678
3	Australia	1,502
4	Netherlands	1,410
5	Cuba	1,325
6	Spain	1,296
7	Russia	1,006
8	Czech Republic	1,005
9	United States	973
10	China	765
11	Canada	702
12	Lithuania	650
13	Hong Kong	632
14	Colombia	530
15	Germany	474
16	France	473
17	Poland	411
18	New Zealand	391
19	Thailand	319
20	Switzerland	311

== Scratch ==
=== Men's individual ===
	Cyclists	Nation	Points
1	Morgan Kneisky	France	729
2	Kazuhiro Mori	Japan	708
3	Tim Mertens	Belgium	670
4	Ángel Dario Colla	Argentina	640
5	Rafał Ratajczyk	Poland	573
6	Andreas Mueller	Austria	460
7	Leigh Howard	Australia	455
8	Hayden Godfrey	New Zealand	452
9	Zachary Bell	Canada	450
10	Wim Stroetinga	Netherlands	430
11	Ho Ting Kwok	Hong Kong	420
12	Franco Marvulli	Switzerland	420
13	Daniel Holloway	United States	410
14	Jason Christie	New Zealand	390
15	Elia Viviani	Italy	368
16	Carlos Torrent Tarres	Spain	305
17	Chris Newton	Great Britain	300
18	Stanislav Volkov	Russia	300
19	Carlos Urán	Colombia	290
20	Martin Hačecký	Czech Republic	270

=== Men's nation ===
	Nation	Points
1	Australia	1,017
2	Japan	973
3	New Zealand	948
4	France	919.5
5	Netherlands	856
6	Poland	821
7	Russia	790
8	United States	761
9	Great Britain	760
10	Czech Republic	736
11	Belgium	732
12	Argentina	706
13	Spain	694
14	Austria	595
15	Hong Kong	584
16	Germany	578
17	Switzerland	560.5
18	Canada	504
19	Italy	481.5
20	Colombia	353

=== Women's individual ===
	Cyclists	Nation	Points
1	Lizzie Armitstead	Great Britain	1,390
2	Evgenia Romanyuta	Russia	880
3	Yumari González	Cuba	800
4	Belinda Goss	Australia	725
5	Annalisa Cucinotta	Italy	675
6	Leire Olaberria Dorronsoro	Spain	600
7	Jarmila Machačová	Czech Republic	565
8	Shelley Olds	United States	560
9	Andrea Wölfer	Switzerland	555
10	Giorgia Bronzini	Italy	503
11	Ellen van Dijk	Netherlands	435
12	Pascale Jeuland	France	405
13	Tara Whitten	Canada	390
14	Xiao Juan Diao	Hong Kong	383
15	Rebecca Quinn	United States	380
16	Malindi Maclean	New Zealand	324
17	Kelly Druyts	Belgium	305
18	Rochelle Gilmore	Australia	300
19	Vera Koedooder	Netherlands	295
20	Laura McCaughey	Australia	295

=== Women's nation ===
	Nation	Points
1	Great Britain	1,724
2	Australia	1,420
3	Cuba	1,370
4	Italy	1,353
5	United States	1,175
6	Netherlands	1,098
7	Russia	1,060
8	Spain	985
9	Czech Republic	911
10	New Zealand	672
11	Hong Kong	641
12	Switzerland	624
13	Canada	580
14	France	540
15	Colombia	370
16	Belarus	353
17	Belgium	347
18	Poland	297.5
19	Thailand	292
20	South Korea	290

== Sprint ==
=== Men's individual ===
	Cyclists	Nation	Points
1	Kévin Sireau	France	1,440
2	Shane Perkins	Australia	1,310
3	Grégory Baugé	France	1,137
4	Mickaël Bourgain	France	1,023
5	Jason Kenny	Great Britain	1,011
6	Michaël D'Almeida	France	915
7	Azizulhasni Awang	Malaysia	845
8	Matthew Crampton	Great Britain	755
9	Teun Mulder	Netherlands	658
10	Maximilian Levy	Germany	652
11	Chris Hoy	Great Britain	650
12	Scott Sunderland	Australia	475
13	Jason Niblett	Australia	471
14	Stefan Nimke	Germany	470
15	Kazunari Watanabe	Japan	470
16	François Pervis	France	430
17	Lei Zhang	China	410
18	Adam Ptáčník	Czech Republic	381
19	Josiah Ng Onn Lam	Malaysia	295
20	Daniel Ellis	Australia	290

=== Men's nation ===
	Nation	Points
1	France	4,515
2	Great Britain	2,686
3	Australia	2,546
4	Germany	1,527
5	Malaysia	1,27
6	Netherlands	1,068
7	Czech Republic	904
8	China	830
9	Japan	730
10	Colombia	620
11	Russia	519
12	Spain	450
13	United States	440
14	Poland	405.5
15	Trinidad and Tobago	373
16	Italy	300
17	Ukraine	297
18	Greece	279
19	New Zealand	273
20	Canada	238

=== Women's individual ===
	Cyclists	Nation	Points
1	Victoria Pendleton	Great Britain	1,720
2	Lyubov Shulika	Ukraine	1,350
3	Willy Kanis	Netherlands	1,200
4	Clara Sanchez	France	984
5	Simona Krupeckaitė	Lithuania	980
6	Lulu Zheng	China	940
7	Shuang Guo	China	800
8	Kaarle McCulloch	Australia	685
9	Yvonne Hijgenaar	Netherlands	570
10	Miriam Welte	Germany	562
11	Christin Muche	Germany	518
12	Lisandra Guerra	Cuba	492
13	Anna Meares	Australia	465
14	Anna Blyth	Great Britain	443
15	Sandie Clair	France	425
16	Jinjie Gong	China	420
17	Kerrie Meares	Australia	420
18	Diana García	Colombia	410
19	Swetlana Grankowskaja	Russia	370
20	Kristina Vogel	Germany	360

=== Women's nation ===
	Nation	Points
1	Great Britain	2,273
2	China	2,270
3	Netherlands	1,905
4	France	1,720
5	Australia	1,695
6	Germany	1,493
7	Ukraine	1,394
8	Lithuania	1,230
9	Russia	740
10	Cuba	622
11	Colombia	550
12	United States	405
13	Belarus	400
14	Chinese Taipei	365
15	New Zealand	304
16	Hong Kong	298
17	Italy	282
18	Canada	189
19	Thailand	181
20	Poland	177

== Time trial ==
=== Men's individual ===
	Cyclists	Nation	Points
1	Michaël D'Almeida	France	1,050
2	Hao Li	China	960
3	Yevhen Bolibrukh	Ukraine	940
4	Kamil Kuczyński	Poland	859
5	Stefan Nimke	Germany	800
6	David Daniell	Great Britain	720
7	Mohd Rizal Tisin	Malaysia	710
8	Scott Sunderland	Australia	660
9	Taylor Phinney	United States	630
10	Quentin Lafargue	France	480
11	François Pervis	France	410
12	Tomáš Bábek	Czech Republic	350
13	David Alonso Castillo	Spain	344
14	Didier Henriette	France	300
15	Thierry Jollet	France	300
16	Edward Dawkins	New Zealand	290
17	Teun Mulder	Netherlands	280
18	Michael Seidenbecher	Germany	265
19	Tim Veldt	Netherlands	260
20	Steven Sansonetti	Australia	255

=== Men's nation ===
	Nation	Points
1	France	2,240
2	Germany	1,425
3	China	1,220
4	Ukraine	1,219
5	Australia	1,160
6	Poland	1,153
7	Great Britain	915
8	Netherlands	795
9	Malaysia	745
10	United States	729
11	Spain	617
12	Czech Republic	594
13	Japan	430
14	New Zealand	390
15	Trinidad and Tobago	203
16	Russia	195
17	Austria	185
18	Colombia	170
19	South Africa	160
20	Argentina	140

=== Women's individual ===
	Cyclists	Nation	Points
1	Simona Krupeckaitė	Lithuania	1,100
2	Jinjie Gong	China	980
3	Sandie Clair	France	970
4	Willy Kanis	Netherlands	820
5	Lisandra Guerra	Cuba	720
6	Victoria Pendleton	Great Britain	700
7	Wai Sze Lee	Hong Kong	690
8	Kaarle McCulloch	Australia	655
9	Anna Meares	Australia	600
10	Miriam Welte	Germany	540
11	Virginie Cueff	France	505
12	Elisa Frisoni	Italy	490
13	Helena Casas Roige	Spain	430
14	Kristina Vogel	Germany	380
15	Yulei Xu	China	380
16	Huang Ting Ying	Chinese Taipei	374
17	Diana García	Colombia	330
18	Fatehah Mustapa	Malaysia	330
19	Anna Blyth	Great Britain	320
20	Fang Tian	China	300

=== Women's nation ===
	Nation	Points
1	China	1,890
2	France	1,570
3	Australia	1,490
4	Lithuania	1,265
5	Netherlands	1,235
6	Great Britain	1,155
7	Germany	985
8	Cuba	955
9	Hong Kong	690
10	Italy	509
11	Chinese Taipei	488
12	Spain	469
13	Colombia	400
14	Malaysia	330
15	Poland	279
16	Russia	251
17	Uruguay	160
18	Thailand	155
19	Ukraine	155
20	Belarus	140

== Keirin ==
=== Men's individual ===
	Cyclists	Nation	Points
1	Azizulhasni Awang	Malaysia	950
2	François Pervis	France	915
3	Teun Mulder	Netherlands	785
4	Andriy Vynokurov	Ukraine	760
5	Shane Perkins	Australia	750
6	Maximilian Levy	Germany	720
7	Ross Edgar	Great Britain	720
8	Christos Volikakis	Greece	620
9	Kévin Sireau	France	600
10	Matthew Crampton	Great Britain	590
11	Jason Niblett	Australia	550
12	Simon van Velthooven	New Zealand	530
13	Chris Hoy	Great Britain	510
14	Carsten Bergemann	Germany	508
15	Kamil Kuczyński	Poland	501
16	Hodei Mazquiarán Uría	Spain	457
17	Kiyofumi Nagai	Japan	440
18	Grégory Baugé	France	430
19	Leonardo Narváez	Colombia	400
20	José Antonio Escuredo	Spain	390

=== Men's nation ===
	Nation	Points
1	France	2,185
2	Great Britain	2,110
3	Australia	1,714
4	Germany	1,494
5	Malaysia	1,348
6	Netherlands	1,210
7	Spain	1,025
8	Japan	960
9	Ukraine	920
10	Greece	855
11	Poland	650.5
12	New Zealand	645
13	Russia	623
14	Czech Republic	539
15	Trinidad and Tobago	440
16	Colombia	420
17	United States	377
18	Italy	306
19	Barbados	253
20	Canada	243

=== Women's individual ===
	Cyclists	Nation	Points
1	Willy Kanis	Netherlands	1,040
2	Shuang Guo	China	980
3	Elisa Frisoni	Italy	910
4	Clara Sanchez	France	880
5	Sandie Clair	France	790
6	Miriam Welte	Germany	705
7	Simona Krupeckaitė	Lithuania	660
8	Kaarle McCulloch	Australia	655
9	Victoria Pendleton	Great Britain	620
10	Lulu Zheng	China	600
11	Diana García	Colombia	550
12	Lisandra Guerra	Cuba	460
13	Christin Muche	Germany	440
14	Fatehah Mustapa	Malaysia	430
15	Yvonne Hijgenaar	Netherlands	360
16	Jinjie Gong	China	360
17	Anna Meares	Australia	350
18	Anna Blyth	Great Britain	335
19	Renata Dąbrowska	Poland	288
20	Natasha Hansen	New Zealand	280

=== Women's nation ===
	Nation	Points
1	China	2
2	France	1,895
3	Netherlands	1,539
4	Australia	1,450
5	Germany	1,340
6	Great Britain	1,250
7	Italy	1,010
8	Colombia	690
9	Lithuania	670
10	Cuba	595
11	Russia	478
12	Malaysia	430
13	New Zealand	399
14	United States	380
15	Poland	342
16	Thailand	264
17	Canada	246
18	Hong Kong	246
19	Argentina	203
20	Spain	199

== Team pursuit ==
=== Men's individual ===
	Cyclists	Nation	Points
1	Jens-Erik Madsen	Denmark	687.5
2	Edward Clancy	Great Britain	660
3	Michael Faerk Christensen	Denmark	607.5
4	Casper Jorgensen	Denmark	590
5	David Muntaner Juaneda	Spain	500
6	Steven Burke	Great Britain	495
7	Rohan Dennis	Australia	490
8	Sergi Escobar Roure	Spain	475
9	Artur Ershov	Russia	457.5
9	Vladimir Shchekunov	Russia	457.5
9	Valery Kaykov	Russia	457.5
9	Leonid Krasnov	Russia	457.5
13	Jack Bobridge	Australia	450
14	Alex Rasmussen	Denmark	447.5
15	Eloy Teruel Rovira	Spain	437.5
16	Mark Jamieson	Australia	410
17	Geraint Thomas	Great Britain	400
18	Vitaliy Shchedov	Ukraine	395
19	Jesse Sergent	New Zealand	370
19	Marc Ryan	New Zealand	370

=== Men's nation ===
	Nation	Points
1	Denmark	2,682.5
2	Great Britain	2,150
3	Russia	2,090
4	Spain	1,977.5
5	Australia	1,907.5
6	Ukraine	1,440
7	New Zealand	1,360
8	Germany	1,301
9	Netherlands	1,030
10	Colombia	975
11	China	700
12	Belgium	690
13	Ireland	560
14	France	447.5
15	South Korea	350
16	Malaysia	300
17	Italy	286
18	Iran	280
19	Chile	260
20	Poland	233

=== Women's individual ===
	Cyclists	Nation	Points
1	Lizzie Armitstead	Great Britain	785
1	Joanna Rowsell	Great Britain	785
3	Katie Colclough	Great Britain	535
4	Lauren Ellis	New Zealand	445
5	Christina Becker	Germany	400
6	Sarah Kent	Australia	370
6	Josephine Tomic	Australia	370
8	Ashlee Ankudinoff	Australia	335
9	Alison Shanks	New Zealand	310
10	Amy Pieters	Netherlands	300
11	Charlotte Becker	Germany	290
12	Kelly Druyts	Belgium	275
12	Jessie Daams	Belgium	275
12	Jolien D'Hoore	Belgium	275
15	Lisa Brennauer	Germany	275
16	Yumari González	Cuba	270
17	Lyubov Shulika	Ukraine	270
17	Lesya Kalytovska	Ukraine	270
19	Dalila Rodríguez Hernandez	Cuba	257.5
20	Victoria Kondel	Russia	255

=== Women's nation ===
	Nation	Points
1	Great Britain	2,355
2	Germany	1,155
3	Australia	1,110
4	New Zealand	1,065
5	Russia	855
6	Belgium	842.5
7	Netherlands	840
8	Cuba	797.5
9	Ukraine	797.5
10	Poland	686
11	China	660
12	Spain	610
13	Belarus	600
14	Lithuania	585
15	Colombia	540
16	Italy	515
17	United States	362
18	France	345
19	Switzerland	45
20	Hong Kong	15

== Team sprint ==
=== Men's individual ===
	Cyclists	Nation	Points
1	Kévin Sireau	France	800
2	Jamie Staff	Great Britain	710
2	Jason Kenny	Great Britain	710
4	Grégory Baugé	France	650
5	Mickaël Bourgain	France	640
6	Daniel Ellis	Australia	634.5
7	Scott Sunderland	Australia	525
8	Maciej Bielecki	Poland	480.5
9	Kazunari Watanabe	Japan	455
10	René Enders	Germany	430
11	Łukasz Kwiatkowski	Poland	429.5
12	Kamil Kuczyński	Poland	426.5
13	Yudai Nitta	Japan	420
14	François Pervis	France	420
15	Stefan Nimke	Germany	407.5
16	Chris Hoy	Great Britain	400
17	Jason Niblett	Australia	380
18	Matthew Crampton	Great Britain	365
19	Hao Li	China	365
20	Pavel Yakushevskiy	Russia	347.5

=== Men's nation ===
	Nation	Points
1	France	2,510
2	Great Britain	2,185
3	Australia	1,814.5
4	Germany	1,435
5	Poland	1,432.5
6	Japan	1,385
7	Malaysia	1,243
8	Russia	1,082.5
9	Ukraine	1,035
10	Netherlands	970
11	China	955
12	Spain	650
13	Czech Republic	521
14	New Zealand	373
15	United States	349.5
16	Greece	332
17	Colombia	285
18	Venezuela	270
19	Iran	260
20	Chile	255

=== Women's individual ===
	Cyclists	Nation	Points
1	Kaarle McCulloch	Australia	485
2	Miriam Welte	Germany	480
3	Renata Dąbrowska	Poland	460
4	Sandie Clair	France	435
5	Anna Meares	Australia	417.5
6	Willy Kanis	Netherlands	400
6	Yvonne Hijgenaar	Netherlands	400
8	Lulu Zheng	China	385
9	Simona Krupeckaitė	Lithuania	360
9	Gintarė Gaivenytė	Lithuania	360
11	Kristina Vogel	Germany	350
12	Aleksandra Drejgier	Poland	305
13	Zhao Juan Meng	Hong Kong	300
14	Jinjie Gong	China	275
15	Anna Blyth	Great Britain	275
16	Clara Sanchez	France	260
17	Wathinee Luekajorh	Thailand	260
18	Wai Sze Lee	Hong Kong	255
19	Kerrie Meares	Australia	250
20	Emily Rosemond	Australia	220

=== Women's nation ===
	Nation	Points
1	Australia	1,152.5
2	Germany	960
3	Poland	924
4	France	870
5	Netherlands	800
6	China	770
7	Lithuania	720
8	Great Britain	630
9	Hong Kong	600
10	Russia	532.5
11	Thailand	520
12	New Zealand	290
13	South Korea	275
14	Colombia	270
15	Uruguay	230
16	Chinese Taipei	205
17	Italy	162.5
18	Venezuela	160
19	Cuba	160
20	Argentina	160

== Madison ==
=== Men's individual ===
	Cyclists	Nation	Points
1	Kenny De Ketele	Belgium	724.5
2	Leigh Howard	Australia	622.5
3	Michael Mørkøv	Denmark	534
4	Roger Kluge	Germany	527.5
5	Alex Rasmussen	Denmark	469
6	Glenn O'Shea	Australia	462.5
7	Iljo Keisse	Belgium	442.5
8	Peter Schep	Netherlands	430
9	Tim Mertens	Belgium	429
10	Olaf Pollack	Germany	429
11	Walter Pérez	Argentina	417.5
12	Angelo Ciccone	Italy	353.5
13	Peter Kennaugh	Great Britain	345
14	Robert Bartko	Germany	334.5
15	Elia Viviani	Italy	321
16	Toni Tauler	Spain	317.5
17	Franco Marvulli	Switzerland	291
18	Cameron Meyer	Australia	290
19	Jiří Hochmann	Czech Republic	279.25
20	Lukasz Bujko	Poland	274

=== Men's nation ===
	Nation	Points
1	Belgium	1,596
2	Australia	1,375
3	Germany	1,291
4	Denmark	1,146
5	Argentina	843
6	Netherlands	802
7	Italy	801
8	Spain	784.5
9	Switzerland	756
10	Great Britain	700
11	Czech Republic	672
12	United States	655
13	Russia	614
14	Poland	562
15	Austria	517.75
16	Colombia	480
17	Ukraine	380.5
18	France	378.5
19	New Zealand	247.5
20	Canada	240

== See also ==
- 2008 UCI Women's Road World Rankings
- 2009 UCI Women's Road World Rankings

Preceded by 2007–08	UCI Track Cycling World Ranking; 2008–09	Succeeded by 2009–10
