= 2008 UCI Track Cycling World Championships – Men's sprint =

Men's sprint at the 2008 UCI Track Cycling World Championships
- Venue: Manchester Velodrome, Manchester
- Date: 27–28 March 2008
- Competitors: 44 from 18 nations

Medalists
gold medal	Chris Hoy	Great Britain
silver medal	Kévin Sireau	France
bronze medal	Mickaël Bourgain	France

The Men's sprint event of the 2008 UCI Track Cycling World Championships was held on 27 and 28 March 2008.

== Results ==
=== Qualifying (200 m time trial) ===
Rank	Name	Nation	100m	Time	Speed (km/h)	Notes
1	Kévin Sireau	France	4.959 (3)	9.992	72.057	Q
2	Grégory Baugé	France	4.914 (1)	10.028	71.798	Q
3	Mickaël Bourgain	France	4.952 (2)	10.029	71.791	Q
4	Chris Hoy	United Kingdom	4.983 (6)	10.032	71.77	Q
4	Theo Bos	Netherlands	4.974 (5)	10.032	71.77	Q
6	François Pervis	France	4.967 (4)	10.035	71.748	Q
7	Jason Kenny	United Kingdom	4.996 (7)	10.067	71.52	Q
8	Maximilian Levy	Germany	5.021 (10)	10.073	71.478	Q
9	Ryan Bayley	Australia	5.001 (8)	10.126	71.104	Q
10	Shane Perkins	Australia	5.018 (9)	10.150	70.935	Q
11	Azizulhasni Awang	Malaysia	5.070 (14)	10.160	70.866	Q
12	Ross Edgar	United Kingdom	5.029 (12)	10.178	70.74	Q
13	Roberto Chiappa	Italy	5.027 (11)	10.187	70.678	Q
14	Andriy Vynokurov	Ukraine	5.045 (13)	10.201	70.581	Q
15	Kazunari Watanabe	Japan	5.085 (17)	10.275	70.072	Q
16	Carsten Bergemann	Germany	5.095 (19)	10.276	70.066	Q
17	Sergey Ruban	Russia	5.107 (20)	10.287	69.991	Q
18	Kiyofumi Nagai	Japan	5.116 (23)	10.292	69.957	Q
19	Mark French	Australia	5.083 (16)	10.296	69.93	Q
20	Teun Mulder	Netherlands	5.088 (18)	10.310	69.835	Q
21	Łukasz Kwiatkowski	Poland	5.121 (25)	10.312	69.821	Q
22	Michael Blatchford	United States	5.081 (15)	10.313	69.814	Q
23	Adam Ptáčník	Czech Republic	5.108 (21)	10.316	69.794	Q
24	Tsubasa Kitatsuru	Japan		10.340	69.632	Q
25	Josiah Ng Onn Lam	Malaysia	5.138 (28)	10.352	69.551	
26	Hodei Mazquiarán Uría	Spain	5.115 (22)	10.366	69.457	
27	Tim Veldt	Netherlands	5.137 (27)	10.373	69.41	
28	Daniel Ellis	Australia	5.118 (24)	10.377	69.384	
29	Sergey Borisov	Russia	5.125 (26)	10.379	69.37	
30	Adam Duvendeck	United States	5.193 (34)	10.419	69.104	
31	Ricardo Lynch	Jamaica	5.145 (29)	10.439	68.972	
32	Álvaro Alonso Rubio	Spain	5.145 (29)	10.456	68.859	
33	Wen Hao Li	China	5.171 (33)	10.460	68.833	
34	Travis Smith	Canada	5.152 (31)	10.475	68.735	
34	Giddeon Massie	United States	5.152 (31)	10.475	68.735	
36	Stefan Nimke	Germany	5.241 (41)	10.500	68.571	
37	Denis Dmitriev	Russia	5.214 (36)	10.512	68.493	
38	Qi Tang	China	5.213 (35)	10.539	68.317	
39	Christos Volikakis	Greece	5.243 (42)	10.592	67.975	
40	Vasileios Reppas	Greece	5.228 (37)	10.617	67.815	
41	Maciej Bielecki	Poland	5.236 (38)	10.638	67.681	
42	Tomáš Bábek	Czech Republic	5.240 (40)	10.647	67.624	
43	Salvador Meliá Mangriñan	Spain	5.238 (39)	10.684	67.39	
44	Athanasios Mantzouranis	Greece	5.274 (43)	10.736	67.064	

=== 1/16 finals ===
Heat	Rank	Name	Nation	Time	Speed (km/h)	Notes
1	1	Kévin Sireau	France	10.549	68.252	Q
1	2	Tsubasa Kitatsuru	Japan			
2	1	Grégory Baugé	France	63.773	11.29	Q
2	2	Adam Ptáčník	Czech Republic			
3	1	Mickaël Bourgain	France	68.123	10.569	Q
3	2	Michael Blatchford	United States			
4	1	Theo Bos	Netherlands	67.039	10.74	Q
4	2	Łukasz Kwiatkowski	Poland			
5	1	Chris Hoy	United Kingdom	66.951	10.754	Q
5	2	Teun Mulder	Netherlands			
6	1	François Pervis	France	66.085	10.895	Q
6	2	Mark French	Australia			
7	1	Jason Kenny	United Kingdom	68.091	10.574	Q
7	2	Kiyofumi Nagai	Japan			
8	1	Maximilian Levy	Germany	65.813	10.94	Q
8	2	Sergey Ruban	Russia			
9	1	Ryan Bayley	Australia	67.873	10.608	Q
9	2	Carsten Bergemann	Germany			
10	1	Shane Perkins	Australia	66.852	10.77	Q
10	2	Kazunari Watanabe	Japan			
11	1	Andriy Vynokurov	Ukraine	63.235	11.386	Q
11	2	Azizulhasni Awang	Malaysia			
12	1	Roberto Chiappa	Italy	67.694	10.636	Q
12	2	Ross Edgar	United Kingdom			

=== 1/8 finals ===
Heat	Rank	Name	Nation	Time	Speed (km/h)	Notes
1	1	Roberto Chiappa	Italy	10.572	68.104	Q
1	2	Kévin Sireau	France			
2	1	Grégory Baugé	France	10.721	67.157	Q
2	2	Andriy Vynokurov	Ukraine			
3	1	Mickaël Bourgain	France	10.461	68.827	Q
3	2	Shane Perkins	Australia			
4	1	Theo Bos	Netherlands	10.571	68.110	Q
4	2	Ryan Bayley	Australia			
5	1	Chris Hoy	United Kingdom	10.922	65.921	Q
5	2	Maximilian Levy	Germany	REL		
6	1	Jason Kenny	United Kingdom	10.770	66.852	Q
6	2	François Pervis	France			

=== 1/8 finals repechage ===
Heat	Rank	Name	Nation	Time	Speed (km/h)	Notes
1	1	Kévin Sireau	France	11.000	65.454	Q
1	2	François Pervis	France			
1	3	Ryan Bayley	Australia			
2	1	Andriy Vynokurov	Ukraine	10.682	67.403	Q
2	2	Shane Perkins	Australia			
2	3	Maximilian Levy	Germany			

=== Quarter finals ===
Heat	Rank	Name	Nation	1st run	2nd run	3rd run	Notes
1	1	Roberto Chiappa	Italy	10.619	10.613		Q
1	2	Andriy Vynokurov	Ukraine				
2	1	Kévin Sireau	France		10.310	10.749	Q
2	2	Grégory Baugé	France	10.744			
3	1	Mickaël Bourgain	France	10.726	10.636		Q
3	2	Jason Kenny	United Kingdom				
4	1	Chris Hoy	United Kingdom		10.563	10.424	Q
4	2	Theo Bos	Netherlands	13.334			

=== Race for 5th–8th places ===
Rank	Name	Nation	Time	Speed (km/h)
5	Jason Kenny	United Kingdom	10.878	66.188
6	Andriy Vynokurov	Ukraine		
7	Grégory Baugé	France		
8	Theo Bos	Netherlands		

=== Semi finals ===
Heat	Rank	Name	Nation	1st run	2nd run	3rd run	Notes
1	1	Chris Hoy	United Kingdom	10.955	10.669		Q
1	2	Roberto Chiappa	Italy				
2	1	Kévin Sireau	France	10.444	10.481		Q
2	2	Mickaël Bourgain	France				

=== Finals ===
Rank	Name	Nation	1st run	2nd run	3rd run
Bronze medal race
3rd place, bronze medalist(s)	Mickaël Bourgain	France	10.545	10.636	
4	Roberto Chiappa	Italy			
Gold medal race
1st place, gold medalist(s)	Chris Hoy	United Kingdom	10.432	10.497	
2nd place, silver medalist(s)	Kévin Sireau	France			
