= 2010–11 UCI Track Cycling World Ranking =

The 2010–11 UCI Track Cycling World Ranking is an overview of the UCI Track Cycling World Ranking, based upon the results in all UCI-sanctioned track cycling races of the 2010–11 track cycling season.

== Summary ==
Discipline	Men's ranking		Women's ranking	
Discipline	Top-ranked individual	Top-ranked nation	Top-ranked individual	Top-ranked nation
Individual pursuit	Jack Bobridge (AUS)	Australia	Sarah Hammer (USA)	New Zealand
Points race	Edwin Ávila (COL)	Russia	Giorgia Bronzini (ITA)	Belarus
Scratch	Martin Bláha (CZE)	Czech Republic	Marianne Vos (NED)	Australia
Sprint	Kévin Sireau (FRA)	France	Anna Meares (AUS)	Australia
Time trial	Stefan Nimke (GER)	France	Lee Wai Sze (HKG)	France
Keirin	Azizulhasni Awang (MAS)	Australia	Anna Meares (AUS)	France
Omnium	Shane Archbold (NZL)	New Zealand	Tara Whitten (CAN)	United States
Team pursuit	Alexei Markov (RUS)	Russia	Wendy Houvenaghel (GBR)	New Zealand
Team sprint	Kévin Sireau (FRA)	France	Jinjie Gong (CHN)	China
Madison	Cameron Meyer (AUS)	Australia	—	

== Individual pursuit ==
=== Men's individual ===
	Cyclists	Nation	Points
1	Jack Bobridge	Australia	630
2	Sun Jae Jang	Korea	540
3	Rohan Dennis	Australia	520
4	Michael Hepburn	Australia	410
5	Jesse Sergent	New Zealand	320
6	Jenning Huizenga	Netherlands	305
7	Sergi Escobar Roure	Spain	280
8	Julien Morice	France	278
9	King Lok Cheung	Hong Kong	275
10	Geraint Thomas	Great Britain	260
11	Valery Kaikov	Russia	245
12	Marc Ryan	New Zealand	220
13	Victor Manakov	Russia	200
14	Artur Ershov	Russia	190
15	Dominique Cornu	Belgium	180
16	Chun Kai Feng	Chinese Taipei	175
17	Vitaliy Shchedov	Ukraine	170
18	Juan Pablo Suárez	Colombia	170
19	Alireza Haghi	Iran	165
20	Asier Maeztu Billelabeitia	Spain	164

=== Men's nation ===
	Nation	Points
1	Australia	1,670
2	Russia	775
3	New Zealand	590
4	Korea	576
5	Spain	558
6	Great Britain	495
7	Netherlands	470
8	Colombia	430
9	Iran	430
10	Switzerland	353
11	Belgium	340
12	France	314
13	Hong Kong	275
14	Germany	246
15	Uzbekistan	225
16	Japan	198
17	Italy	192
18	Ukraine	188
19	Chinese Taipei	187
20	United States	160

=== Women's individual ===
	Cyclists	Nation	Points
1	Sarah Hammer	United States	670
2	Alison Shanks	New Zealand	620
3	Pascale Schnider	Switzerland	420
4	Aksana Papko	Belarus	418
5	Jaime Nielsen	New Zealand	390
6	Vaida Pikauskaitė	Lithuania	365
7	Wendy Houvenaghel	Great Britain	360
8	Vilija Sereikaitė	Lithuania	340
9	Nontasin Chanpeng	Thailand	321
10	Caroline Ryan	Ireland	310
11	Ellen van Dijk	Netherlands	270
12	Fan Jiang	China	270
13	Lisa Brennauer	Germany	195
14	Marlies Mejías Garcia	Cuba	180
15	Aleksandra Sošenko	Lithuania	180
16	Yudelmis Domínguez Massagué	Cuba	170
17	Ju Mi Lee	Korea	170
18	Chao Mei Wu	China	170
19	Ah Reum Na	Korea	165
20	Aude Biannic	France	158

=== Women's nation ===
	Nation	Points
1	New Zealand	1,280
2	United States	965
3	Lithuania	945
4	Great Britain	530
5	Belarus	508
6	Switzerland	480
7	Korea	480
8	Cuba	460
9	China	440
10	Germany	400
11	Australia	361
12	Netherlands	360
13	Ireland	324
14	Thailand	321
15	Chinese Taipei	272
16	France	264
17	Czech Republic	232
18	Canada	160
19	Mexico	144
20	Colombia	140

== Points race ==
=== Men's individual ===
	Cyclists	Nation	Points
1	Edwin Ávila	Colombia	500
2	Artur Ershov	Russia	470
3	Milan Kadlec	Czech Republic	380
4	Cameron Meyer	Australia	340
5	Morgan Kneisky	France	280
6	Alexei Markov	Russia	260
7	Zachary Bell	Canada	254
8	Alexander Khatuntsev	Russia	220
9	Omar Bertazzo	Italy	220
10	Claudio Imhof	Switzerland	220
11	Thomas Scully	New Zealand	210
12	Vladimir Tuychiev	Uzbekistan	200
13	Peter Schep	Netherlands	190
14	Ho-Sung Cho	Korea	185
15	Ki Ho Choi	Hong Kong	180
16	Jordan Kerby	Australia	180
17	Ingmar De Poortere	Belgium	170
18	Mohammad Rajablou	Iran	170
19	Weimar Roldán	Colombia	170
20	Gerardo Luis Fernandez	Argentina	160

=== Men's nation ===
	Nation	Points
1	Russia	1,020
2	Australia	790
3	Colombia	670
4	Switzerland	548
5	Czech Republic	510
6	France	503
7	Italy	384
8	Hong Kong	377
9	Greece	375
10	Iran	370
11	Canada	350
12	Korea	349
13	Japan	341
14	Poland	328
15	Belgium	304
16	Netherlands	274
17	Uzbekistan	253
18	New Zealand	226
19	Argentina	225
20	Germany	218

=== Women's individual ===
	Cyclists	Nation	Points
1	Giorgia Bronzini	Italy	640
2	Tatsiana Sharakova	Belarus	600
3	Aksana Papko	Belarus	465
4	Jarmila Machačová	Czech Republic	460
5	Wan Yiu Jamie Wong	Hong Kong	345
6	Madeleine Sandig	Germany	288
7	Kelly Druyts	Belgium	276
8	Minami Ueno	Japan	253
9	Pascale Schnider	Switzerland	250
10	Nontasin Chanpeng	Thailand	250
11	Cari Higgins	United States	220
12 3	Yoanka González Perez	Cuba	210
13	Theresa Cliff-Ryan	United States	194
14	Melissa Hoskins	Australia	185
15	Belinda Goss	Australia	180
16	Danielys García	Venezuela	170
17	Ah Reum Na	Korea	170
18	Megan Dunn	Australia	170
19	Mayuko Hagiwara	Japan	170
20	Marianne Vos	Netherlands	160

=== Women's nation ===
	Nation	Points
1	Belarus	1,215
2	Italy	923
3	Australia	695
4	Czech Republic	565
5	United States	464
6	Japan	439
7	Germany	418
8	Belgium	400
9	Cuba	350
10	Hong Kong	345
11	Canada	343
12	China	340
13	Great Britain	295
14	Colombia	283
15	New Zealand	273
16	Thailand	262
17	Switzerland	258
18	Netherlands	244
19	Chinese Taipei	225
20	Korea	220

== Scratch ==
=== Men's individual ===
	Cyclists	Nation	Points
1	Martin Bláha	Czech Republic	545
2	Morgan Kneisky	France	540
3	Ho Ting Kwok	Hong Kong	500
4	Elia Viviani	Italy	345
5	Sebastián Mora Vedri	Spain	330
6	Andreas Mueller	Austria	325
7	Cameron Meyer	Australia	290
8	Gijs Van Hoecke	Belgium	260
9	Turakit Boonratanathanakorn	Thailand	250
10	Carlos Ospina	Colombia	250
11	Ralf Matzka	Germany	235
12	Carlos Urán	Colombia	223
13	Alex Buttazzoni	Italy	220
14	Loïc Perizzolo	Switzerland	201
15	Unai Elorriaga Zubiaur	Spain	200
16	Rafał Ratajczyk	Poland	200
17	Evgeniy Sladkov	Kazakhstan	200
18	Marco Arriagada	Chile	180
19	Sun Jae Jang	Korea	170
20	Leigh Howard	Australia	170

=== Men's nation ===
	Nation	Points
1	Czech Republic	730
2	Italy	710
3	Australia	700
4	Hong Kong	650
5	France	624
6	Spain	560
7	Belgium	480
8	Colombia	473
9	Russia	430
10	Austria	415
11	Poland	400
12	Chile	370
13	United States	345
14	Korea	340
15	Switzerland	339
16	Germany	288
17	Great Britain	280
18	Thailand	250
19	Kazakhstan	230
20	Japan	185

=== Women's individual ===
	Cyclists	Nation	Points
1	Marianne Vos	Netherlands	500
2	Katherine Bates	Australia	490
3	Anastasia Chulkova	Russia	440
4	Sofía Arreola	Mexico	430
5	Jennie Reed	United States	390
6	Fatehah Mustapa	Malaysia	310
7	Amy Cure	Australia	280
8	Kelly Druyts	Belgium	270
9	Dani King	Great Britain	260
10	Giorgia Bronzini	Italy	260
11	Aksana Papko	Belarus	258
12	Else Belmans	Belgium	220
13	Małgorzata Wojtyra	Poland	218
14	Annette Edmondson	Australia	210
15	Pascale Jeuland	France	208
16	Elke Gebhardt	Germany	200
17	Xiao Juan Diao	Hong Kong	180
18	Hsiao Chia Tseng	Chinese Taipei	170
19	Renata Dąbrowska	Poland	170
20	Yumari González	Cuba	170

=== Women's nation ===
	Nation	Points
1	Australia	1,110
2	Netherlands	645
3	United States	633
4	Italy	605
5	Russia	577
6	Belgium	534
7	Poland	493
8	Mexico	454
9	France	383
10	Great Britain	342
11	Chinese Taipei	340
12	Malaysia	320
13	Belarus	320
14	Czech Republic	320
15	Hong Kong	310
16	Cuba	260
17	Korea	240
18	Germany	236
19	Spain	223
20	Thailand	160

== Sprint ==
=== Men's individual ===
	Cyclists	Nation	Points
1	Kévin Sireau	France	1,560
2	Tsubasa Kitatsuru	Japan	1,085
3	Jason Kenny	Great Britain	1,050
4	Chris Hoy	Great Britain	783
5	Grégory Baugé	France	747
6	Shane Perkins	Australia	670
7	Lei Zhang	China	590
8	Zhang Miao	China	570
9	Mickaël Bourgain	France	494
10	Michaël D'Almeida	France	490
11	Matthew Crampton	Great Britain	435
12	Scott Sunderland	Australia	429
13	Teun Mulder	Netherlands	380
14	Damian Zieliński	Poland	370
15	Tobias Wachter	Germany	356
16	Travis Smith	Canada	350
17	Robert Förstemann	Germany	337
18	Denis Špička	Czech Republic	330
19	Peter Mitchell	Great Britain	329
20	Maximilian Levy	Germany	326

=== Men's nation ===
	Nation	Points
1	France	3,291
2	Great Britain	2,597
3	Australia	1,534
4	Japan	1,510
5	Germany	1,339
6	China	1,262
7	Czech Republic	803
8	Poland	775
9	Netherlands	676
10	Russia	552
11	Malaysia	543
12	Greece	527
13	Canada	514
14	New Zealand	440
15	Spain	314
16	Italy	303
17	Korea	275
18	Colombia	270
19	Venezuela	190
20	Iran	182

=== Women's individual ===
	Cyclists	Nation	Points
1	Anna Meares	Australia	1,370
2	Victoria Pendleton	Great Britain	1,080
3	Shuang Guo	China	1,060
4	Kristina Vogel	Germany	1,045
5	Simona Krupeckaitė	Lithuania	1,040
6	Sandie Clair	France	944
7	Wai Sze Lee	Hong Kong	749
8	Olga Panarina	Belarus	630
9	Jessica Varnish	Great Britain	546
10	Rebecca Angharad James	Great Britain	545
11	Lin Junhong	China	543
12	Willy Kanis	Netherlands	537
13	Lyubov Shulika	Ukraine	530
14	Clara Sanchez	France	529
15	Kaarle McCulloch	Australia	465
16	Virginie Cueff	France	452
17	Lisandra Guerra Rodriguez	Cuba	440
18	Emily Rosemond	Australia	326
19	Jinjie Gong	China	324
20	Won Gyeong Kim	Korea	265

=== Women's nation ===
	Nation	Points
1	Australia	2,286
2	Great Britain	2,208
3	China	2,037
4	France	1,966
5	Germany	1,352
6	Lithuania	1,288
7	Hong Kong	984
8	Netherlands	814
9	Belarus	724
10	Ukraine	586
11	Korea	535
12	Russia	468
13	Cuba	465
14	Colombia	280
15	Canada	274
16	Spain	221
17	Japan	217
18	Malaysia	210
19	Poland	170
20	Chinese Taipei	166

== Time trial ==
=== Men's individual ===
	Cyclists	Nation	Points
1	Stefan Nimke	Germany	600
2	François Pervis	France	540
3	Tomáš Bábek	Czech Republic	475
4	Quentin Lafargue	France	450
5	Zhang Miao	China	420
6	Hugo Haak	Netherlands	415
7	Joachim Eilers	Germany	330
8	Adrian Tekliński	Poland	330
9	Teun Mulder	Netherlands	320
10	Nikolay Zhurkin	Russia	290
11	Mohd Rizal Tisin	Malaysia	250
12	Andrey Kubeev	Russia	228
13	Michaël D'Almeida	France	220
14	Yudai Nitta	Japan	220
15	Simon$!1van Velthooven	New Zealand	220
16	Francesco Ceci	Italy	213
17	James Glasspool	Australia	190
18	Eric Engler	Germany	175
19	Scott Sunderland	Australia	170
20	Christopher Sellier	Trinidad and Tobago	170

=== Men's nation ===
	Nation	Points
1	France	1,360
2	Germany	1,165
3	Netherlands	835
4	Czech Republic	645
5	Poland	552
6	Australia	550
7	Russia	532
8	Malaysia	455
9	New Zealand	430
10	China	420
11	Japan	419
12	Italy	365
13	Korea	255
14	Colombia	240
15	Iran	225
16	Canada	214
17	Ukraine	203
18	Spain	192
19	Trinidad and Tobago	173
20	Great Britain	160

=== Women's individual ===
	Cyclists	Nation	Points
1	Wai Sze Lee	Hong Kong	1,060
2	Sandie Clair	France	850
3	Olga Panarina	Belarus	660
4	Willy Kanis	Netherlands	540
5	Shuang Guo	China	375
6	Miriam Welte	Germany	360
7	Lisandra Guerra Rodriguez	Cuba	350
8	Won Gyeong Kim	Korea	345
9	Rebecca Angharad James	Great Britain	325
10	Fatehah Mustapa	Malaysia	305
11	Anna Meares	Australia	300
12	Kayono Maeda	Japan	280
13	Huang Ting Ying	Chinese Taipei	280
14	Kaarle McCulloch	Australia	270
15	Olga Streltsova	Russia	264
16	Stephanie Morton	Australia	205
17	Angeliki Koutsonikoli	Greece	180
18	Jessica Varnish	Great Britain	170
19	Monique Sullivan	Canada	170
20	Virginie Cueff	France	170

=== Women's nation ===
	Nation	Points
1	France	1,140
2	Hong Kong	1,060
3	Australia	925
4	Belarus	795
5	Netherlands	710
6	Great Britain	593
7	Germany	495
8	China	475
9	Lithuania	429
10	Japan	404
11	Korea	394
12	Cuba	370
13	Russia	356
14	Chinese Taipei	340
15	Malaysia	305
16	Poland	270
17	Canada	232
18	Mexico	214
19	Spain	204
20	Greece	194

== Keirin ==
=== Men's individual ===
	Cyclists	Nation	Points
1	Azizulhasni Awang	Malaysia	1,090
2	Chris Hoy	Great Britain	920
3	Jason Niblett	Australia	645
4	Simon van Velthooven	New Zealand	640
5	Scott Sunderland	Australia	638
6	Denis Špička	Czech Republic	618
7	Shane Perkins	Australia	600
8	Teun Mulder	Netherlands	503
9	Jason Kenny	Great Britain	485
10	Christos Volikakis	Greece	470
11	Kota Asai	Japan	440
12	Kazunari Watanabe	Japan	425
13	René Enders	Germany	415
14	François Pervis	France	390
15	Josiah Ng Onn Lam	Malaysia	375
16	Matthew Crampton	Great Britain	370
17	Hersony Canelón	Venezuela	360
18	Fabián Puerta	Colombia	360
19	Mickaël Bourgain	France	358
20	Edward Dawkins	New Zealand	348

=== Men's nation ===
	Nation	Points
1	Australia	2,033
2	Great Britain	1,940
3	Malaysia	1,655
4	France	1,162
5	Germany	1,136
6	Japan	1,095
7	Czech Republic	1,068
8	New Zealand	1,014
9	Netherlands	819
10	Greece	661
11	Poland	623
12	Colombia	520
13	Venezuela	390
14	Russia	346
15	Spain	344
16	Italy	327
17	China	325
18	Korea	258
19	Canada	194
20	Trinidad and Tobago	160

=== Women's individual ===
	Cyclists	Nation	Points
1	Anna Meares	Australia	1,230
2	Clara Sanchez	France	1,110
3	Victoria Pendleton	Great Britain	830
4	Sandie Clair	France	820
5	Simona Krupeckaitė	Lithuania	718
6	Olga Panarina	Belarus	690
7	Shuang Guo	China	690
8	Lyubov Shulika	Ukraine	650
9	Kristina Vogel	Germany	618
10	Jinjie Gong	China	540
11	Virginie Cueff	France	486
12	Lisandra Guerra Rodriguez	Cuba	480
13	Wai Sze Lee	Hong Kong	474
14	Fatehah Mustapa	Malaysia	468
15	Kaarle McCulloch	Australia	465
16	Willy Kanis	Netherlands	424
17	Rebecca Angharad James	Great Britain	420
18	Emily Rosemond	Australia	410
19	Zhao Juan Meng	Hong Kong	295
20	Eunmi Park	Korea	260

=== Women's nation ===
	Nation	Points
1	France	2,416
2	Australia	2,235
3	China	1,460
4	Great Britain	1,351
5	Germany	978
6	Lithuania	923
7	Belarus	880
8	Hong Kong	799
9	Ukraine	713
10	Netherlands	680
11	Cuba	540
12	Malaysia	468
13	Russia	371
14	Korea	325
15	Colombia	260
16	Thailand	255
17	Canada	212
18	Mexico	184
19	Japan	166
20	Venezuela	160

== Omnium ==
=== Men's individual ===
	Cyclists	Nation	Points
1	Shane Archbold	New Zealand	1,190
2	Zachary Bell	Canada	930
3	Michael Freiberg	Australia	845
4	Eloy Teruel Rovira	Spain	610
5	Edward Clancy	Great Britain	610
6	Ho-Sung Cho	Korea	600
7	Elia Viviani	Italy	540
8	Rafał Ratajczyk	Poland	515
9	Juan Esteban Arango	Colombia	460
10	Ho Ting Kwok	Hong Kong	409
11	Gijs Van Hoecke	Belgium	390
12	Roger Kluge	Germany	390
13	Samuel Harrison	Great Britain	360
14	Tim Veldt	Netherlands	330
15	Carlos Urán	Colombia	330
16	Jan Dostal	Czech Republic	320
17	Martyn Irvine	Ireland	315
18	Kazuhiro Mori	Japan	290
19	Bryan Coquard	France	278
20	Alois Kaňkovský	Czech Republic	274

=== Men's nation ===
	Nation	Points
1	New Zealand	1,610
2	Australia	1,168
3	Great Britain	1,110
4	Canada	1,024
5	Spain	906
6	Korea	833
7	Colombia	790
8	Belgium	720
9	Poland	674
10	Germany	660
11	Czech Republic	638
12	Italy	634
13	Netherlands	585
14	Russia	524
15	Hong Kong	501
16	Japan	485
17	France	427
18	Denmark	330
19	United States	330
20	Ireland	315

=== Women's individual ===
	Cyclists	Nation	Points
1	Tara Whitten	Canada	1,330
2	Sarah Hammer	United States	1,190
3	Małgorzata Wojtyra	Poland	1,155
4	Leire Olaberria Dorronsoro	Spain	1,140
5	Kirsten Wild	Netherlands	760
6	Tatsiana Sharakova	Belarus	650
7	Pascale Jeuland	France	586
8	Jolien D'Hoore	Belgium	550
9	Xiao Juan Diao	Hong Kong	510
10	Joanne Kiesanowski	New Zealand	420
11	Melissa Hoskins	Australia	418
12	Evgenia Romanyuta	Russia	382
13	Laura Trott	Great Britain	330
14	Jarmila Machačová	Czech Republic	330
15	Marlies Mejías Garcia	Cuba	300
16	Lizzie Armitstead	Great Britain	280
17	Vilija Sereikaitė	Lithuania	270
18	Angie González	Venezuela	260
19	Min Hye Lee	Korea	240
20	Cari Higgins	United States	235

=== Women's nation ===
	Nation	Points
1	United States	1,520
2	Canada	1,404
3	Spain	1,340
4	Poland	1,278
5	Netherlands	1,015
6	Australia	804
7	Belarus	760
8	France	746
9	Belgium	714
10	Great Britain	610
11	Hong Kong	573
12	Korea	530
13	New Zealand	495
14	Russia	460
15	Lithuania	460
16	Czech Republic	420
17	Thailand	369
18	Chinese Taipei	330
19	Cuba	300
20	Japan	296

== Team pursuit ==
=== Men's individual ===
	Cyclists	Nation	Points
1	Alexei Markov	Russia	540
1	Alexander Serov	Russia	540
3	Michael Hepburn	Australia	522.5
4	Evgeny Kovalev	Russia	520
5	Jack Bobridge	Australia	485
6	Pablo Aitor Bernal Rosique	Spain	480
7	Steven Burke	Great Britain	465
8	David Muntaner Juaneda	Spain	460
9	Marc Ryan	New Zealand	390
10	Asier Maeztu Billelabeitia	Spain	385
11	Levi Heimans	Netherlands	385
12	Rohan Dennis	Australia	370
13	Eloy Teruel Rovira	Spain	355
14	Edward Clancy	Great Britain	345
15	Sergi Escobar Roure	Spain	320
16	Andrew Tennant	Great Britain	315
17	Alexander Khatuntsev	Russia	315
18	Ingmar De Poortere	Belgium	309
19	Jonathan Dufrasne	Belgium	305
20	Arles Castro	Colombia	305
20	Weimar Roldán	Colombia	305
20	Edwin Ávila	Colombia	305

=== Men's nation ===
	Nation	Points
1	Russia	2,940
2	Australia	2,740
3	Great Britain	2,500
4	Spain	2,440
5	New Zealand	2,180
6	Netherlands	1,540
7	Belgium	1,456
8	France	1,340
9	Korea	1,232.5
10	Colombia	1,220
11	Denmark	1,200
12	Germany	970
13	Hong Kong	910
14	Switzerland	900
15	Ukraine	640
16	Iran	610
17	Japan	532
18	Chile	520
19	China	400
20	Chinese Taipei	390

=== Women's individual ===
	Cyclists	Nation	Points
1	Wendy Houvenaghel	Great Britain	595
2	Jaime Nielsen	New Zealand	575
3	Dotsie Bausch	United States	545
4	Laura Trott	Great Britain	525
5	Sarah Hammer	United States	485
6	Laura Brown	Canada	485
7	Lauren Ellis	New Zealand	455
8	Kaytee Boyd	New Zealand	445
9	Tara Whitten	Canada	440
10	Madeleine Sandig	Germany	415
10	Lisa Brennauer	Germany	415
12	Alison Shanks	New Zealand	400
13	Josephine Tomic	Australia	395
14	Stephanie Roorda	Canada	395
15	Dani King	Great Britain	380
16	Vera Koedooder	Netherlands	360
17	Charlotte Becker	Germany	360
18	Katherine Bates	Australia	345
19	Sarah Kent	Australia	345
20	Vaida Pikauskaitė	Lithuania	320

=== Women's nation ===
	Nation	Points
1	New Zealand	2,175
2	Australia	1,965
3	Great Britain	1,935
4	United States	1,740
5	Canada	1,455
6	Germany	1,290
7	Belgium	1,110
8	Netherlands	1,102.5
9	Lithuania	990
10	China	960
11	Russia	690
12	Korea	690
13	Ukraine	630
14	Belarus	585
15	Poland	570
16	Hong Kong	411
17	Italy	304.5
18	Thailand	255
19	Cuba	210
20	Colombia	180
20	Chinese Taipei	180

== Team sprint ==
=== Men's individual ===
	Cyclists	Nation	Points
1	Kévin Sireau	France	765
1	Michaël D'Almeida	France	765
3	Chris Hoy	Great Britain	615
3	Jason Kenny	Great Britain	615
3	Matthew Crampton	Great Britain	615
6	Grégory Baugé	France	550
7	Stefan Nimke	Germany	550
8	Zhang Miao	China	470
8	Changsong Cheng	China	470
10	Sergey Kucherov	Russia	464.5
11	Kazunari Watanabe	Japan	462.5
12	Edward Dawkins	New Zealand	455
12	Ethan Mitchell	New Zealand	455
12	Sam Webster	New Zealand	455
15	Lei Zhang	China	430
16	Kazuki Amagai	Japan	417
17	René Enders	Germany	412
18	Maximilian Levy	Germany	405
19	Denis Dmitriev	Russia	404.5
20	Yudai Nitta	Japan	402.5

=== Men's nation ===
	Nation	Points
1	France	2,295
2	Germany	2,226
3	Great Britain	2,076
4	Japan	1,738.5
5	Russia	1,678.5
6	Australia	1,575
7	Poland	1,485
8	China	1,470
9	New Zealand	1,365
10	Malaysia	889.5
11	Netherlands	822
12	Czech Republic	720
13	Canada	690
14	Iran	441
15	Colombia	405
16	Korea	397.5
17	Greece	369
18	Venezuela	315
19	Spain	225
20	United States	210

=== Women's individual ===
	Cyclists	Nation	Points
1	Jinjie Gong	China	720
2	Jessica Varnish	Great Britain	615
3	Sandie Clair	France	610
4	Kaarle McCulloch	Australia	605
5	Victoria Pendleton	Great Britain	555
6	Miriam Welte	Germany	445
6	Kristina Vogel	Germany	445
8	Anna Meares	Australia	437.5
9	Clara Sanchez	France	415
10	Willy Kanis	Netherlands	415
10	Yvonne Hijgenaar	Netherlands	415
12	Shuang Guo	China	400
13	Simona Krupeckaitė	Lithuania	390
13	Gintarė Gaivenytė	Lithuania	390
15	Helena Casas Roige	Spain	340
16	Tania Calvo Barbero	Spain	335
17	Wai Sze Lee	Hong Kong	324
17	Zhao Juan Meng	Hong Kong	324
19	Lin Junhong	China	320
20	Victoria Baranova	Russia	270

=== Women's nation ===
	Nation	Points
1	China	1,580
2	Great Britain	1,295
3	France	1,220
4	Australia	1,210
5	Germany	890
6	Netherlands	830
7	Lithuania	780
8	Spain	740
9	Russia	715
10	Hong Kong	668
11	Ukraine	495
12	Korea	475
13	Colombia	470
14	Chinese Taipei	325
14	Japan	325
16	Poland	300
17	Cuba	260
18	Greece	240
19	Thailand	224
20	Mexico	190

== Madison ==
=== Men's individual ===
	Cyclists	Nation	Points
1	Cameron Meyer	Australia	485
1	Leigh Howard	Australia	485
3	Martin Bláha	Czech Republic	274.5
3	Jiří Hochmann	Czech Republic	274.5
5	Peter Schep	Netherlands	257.5
6	Ki Ho Choi	Hong Kong	255
7	Aaron Gate	New Zealand	210
8	Myron Simpson	New Zealand	195
9	Andreas Mueller	Austria	165
9	Andreas Graf	Austria	165
11	Vivien Brisse	France	152
12	David Muntaner Juaneda	Spain	150
13	Morgan Kneisky	France	145
14	Weimar Roldán	Colombia	145
15	Claudio Imhof	Switzerland	141.5
16	Theo Bos	Netherlands	140
17	Elia Viviani	Italy	131
18	Nick Stopler	Netherlands	120
19	Unai Elorriaga Zubiaur	Spain	119
20	Kenny De Ketele	Belgium	117.5

=== Men's nation ===
	Nation	Points
1	Australia	1,007.5
2	Czech Republic	585
3	Belgium	565
4	Netherlands	536
5	Hong Kong	510
6	Spain	491
7	Italy	452.5
8	France	445
9	Switzerland	430.5
10	New Zealand	420
11	Germany	374.5
12	Austria	340
13	Russia	308
14	Argentina	304
15	Colombia	290
16	Ukraine	260
17	Iran	225
18	Japan	220
19	Kazakhstan	180
20	Korea	170

== See also ==
- 2010 UCI Women's Road World Rankings
- 2011 UCI Women's Road World Rankings

Preceded by 2009–10	UCI Track Cycling World Ranking; 2010–11	Succeeded by 2011–12
