= 2011 European Track Championships – Men's sprint =

UEC European Champion jersey

The men's sprint was held on 22 October 2011, with 24 riders participating.

== Medalists ==
Gold	Kévin Sireau (FRA)
Silver	Maximilian Levy (GER)
Bronze	Denis Dmitriev (RUS)

== Results ==
=== Qualifying ===
The fastest 24 riders advanced to the 1/16 finals, the qualifying was held at 11:30.

Rank	Name	Nation	Time	Notes
1	Kévin Sireau	France	10.087	Q
2	Maximilian Levy	Germany	10.137	Q
3	Robert Förstemann	Germany	10.163	Q
4	Chris Hoy	Great Britain	10.177	Q
5	Denis Dmitriev	Russia	10.198	Q
6	Jason Kenny	Great Britain	10.272	Q
7	Damian Zieliński	Poland	10.420	Q
8	Sergey Borisov	Russia	10.436	Q
9	Charlie Conord	France	10.442	Q
10	Teun Mulder	Netherlands	10.470	Q
11	Juan Peralta	Spain	10.492	Q
12	Hodei Mazquiarán	Spain	10.494	Q
13	Adam Ptáčník	Czech Republic	10.512	Q
14	Roy van den Berg	Netherlands	10.564	Q
15	Andriy Vynokurov	Ukraine	10.573	Q
16	Maciej Bielecki	Poland	10.592	Q
17	Christos Volikakis	Greece	10.593	Q
18	Luca Ceci	Italy	10.614	Q
19	Andrii Kutsenko	Ukraine	10.757	Q
20	Francesco Ceci	Italy	10.785	Q
21	Filip Ditzel	Czech Republic	10.786	Q
22	Zafeiris Volikakis	Greece	10.794	Q
23	Sándor Szalontay	Hungary	10.895	Q
24	Balázs Juhász	Hungary	11.844	Q

=== 1/16 finals ===
The winner of each heat qualified to the 1/8 finals, the races were held at 12:40.

Heat	Rank	Name	Nation	Time	Notes
1	1	Kévin Sireau	France	12.237	Q
1	2	Balázs Juhász	Hungary		
2	1	Maximilian Levy	Germany	11.240	Q
2	2	Sándor Szalontay	Hungary		
3	1	Robert Förstemann	Germany	11.345	Q
3	2	Zafeiris Volikakis	Greece		
4	1	Filip Ditzel	Czech Republic		Q
4	2	Chris Hoy	Great Britain		DNS
5	1	Denis Dmitriev	Russia	11.254	Q
5	2	Francesco Ceci	Italy		
6	1	Jason Kenny	Great Britain	10.566	Q
6	2	Andrii Kutsenko	Ukraine		
7	1	Damian Zieliński	Poland	10.621	Q
7	2	Luca Ceci	Italy		
8	1	Sergey Borisov	Ukraine	10.684	Q
8	2	Christos Volikakis	Greece		
9	1	Charlie Conord	France	10.769	Q
9	2	Maciej Bielecki	Poland		
10	1	Teun Mulder	Netherlands	10.944	Q
10	2	Andriy Vynokurov	Ukraine		
11	1	Juan Peralta	Spain	10.742	Q
11	2	Roy van den Berg	Netherlands		
12	1	Adam Ptáčník	Czech Republic	10.829	Q
12	2	Hodei Mazquiarán	Spain		

=== 1/8 finals ===
The winner of each heat qualified to the 1/4 finals, losers went to the repechage. The races were held at 13:52.

Heat	Rank	Name	Nation	Time	Notes
1	1	Kévin Sireau	France	10.862	Q
1	2	Adam Ptáčník	Czech Republic		
2	1	Maximilian Levy	Germany	10.653	Q
2	2	Juan Peralta	Spain		
3	1	Robert Förstemann	Germany	10.815	Q
3	2	Teun Mulder	Netherlands		
4	1	Charlie Conord	France	11.048	Q
4	2	Filip Ditzel	Czech Republic		
5	1	Denis Dmitriev	Russia	11.785	Q
5	2	Sergey Borisov	Ukraine		
6	1	Jason Kenny	Great Britain	10.540	Q
6	2	Damian Zieliński	Poland		

=== 1/8 finals repechage ===
The losers of the 1/8 finals raced, winners advanced to the quarterfinals. Races were held at 14:28.

Heat	Rank	Name	Nation	Time	Notes
1	1	Damian Zieliński	Poland	11.155	Q
1	2	Adam Ptáčník	Czech Republic		
1	3	Filip Ditzel	Czech Republic		
2	1	Teun Mulder	Netherlands	10.995	Q
2	2	Juan Peralta	Spain		
2	3	Sergey Borisov	Ukraine		

=== Quarterfinals ===
The races were held at 15:10 and 16:04.

Heat	Rank	Name	Nation	Race 1	Race 2	Decider	Notes
1	1	Kévin Sireau	France	10.652	11.469		Q
1	2	Teun Mulder	Netherlands				
2	1	Maximilian Levy	Germany	10.618	11.129		Q
2	2	Damian Zieliński	Poland				
3	1	Jason Kenny	Great Britain	10.701	10.419		Q
3	2	Robert Förstemann	Germany				
4	1	Denis Dmitriev	Russia	10.706	10.695		Q
4	2	Charlie Conord	France				

=== Race for 5th–8th places ===
The race was held at 20:48.

Rank	Name	Nation	Time
5	Robert Förstemann	Germany	10.715
6	Teun Mulder	Netherlands	
7	Damian Zieliński	Poland	
8	Charlie Conord	France	

=== Semifinals ===
The races were held at 19:36, 20:18 and 20:42.

Heat	Rank	Name	Nation	Race 1	Race 2	Decider	Notes
1	1	Kévin Sireau	France	10.505	10.281		Q
1	2	Denis Dmitriev	Russia				
2	1	Maximilian Levy	Germany		10.386	10.371	Q
2	2	Jason Kenny	Great Britain	10.864			

=== Finals ===
The races were held at 21:04 and 21:19.

Rank	Name	Nation	Race 1	Race 2	Decider
Gold medal races
1st place, gold medalist(s)	Kévin Sireau	France	10.450	10.529	
2nd place, silver medalist(s)	Maximilian Levy	Germany			
Bronze medal races
3rd place, bronze medalist(s)	Denis Dmitriev	Russia	10.695	10.846	
4	Jason Kenny	Great Britain			
