= Cycling at the 2008 Summer Olympics – Men's team sprint =

Men's team sprint at the Games of the XXIX Olympiad
- Olympic Track cycling
- Venue: Laoshan Velodrome
- Dates: August 15
- Competitors: 39 from 13 nations
- Winning time: 43.128

Medalists
1st place, gold medalist(s)		Chris Hoy, Jason Kenny, Jamie Staff	Great Britain
2nd place, silver medalist(s)		Grégory Baugé, Kévin Sireau, Arnaud Tournant	France
3rd place, bronze medalist(s)		René Enders, Maximilian Levy, Stefan Nimke	Germany

The men's team sprint at the 2008 Summer Olympics took place on August 15 at the Laoshan Velodrome.

After delivering three superb rides in the process, British trio Chris Hoy, Jason Kenny, and Jamie Staff defeated France by a 0.523-second margin to dominate the team sprint final with a gold-medal time in 43.128. The French threesome of Grégory Baugé, Kévin Sireau, and Arnaud Tournant took home the silver in 43.651, while Germany's René Enders, Maximilian Levy, and Stefan Nimke edged out the Aussies by eight hundredths of a second for the bronze in 44.014.

== Competition format ==
A men's team sprint race consists of a three-lap race between two teams of three cyclists, starting on opposite sides of the track. Each member of the team must lead for one of the laps.

The tournament consisted of an initial qualifying round. The top eight teams advanced to the first round. The first round comprised head-to-head races based on seeding (1st vs. 8th, 2nd vs. 7th, etc.). The winners of those four heats advanced to the medal round, with the two fastest winners competing in the gold medal final and the two slower winners facing off for bronze.

== Schedule ==
All times are China standard time (UTC+8).

Date	Time	Round
Friday, August 15, 2008	16:15	Qualifications and final

== Results ==
=== Qualification ===
Rank	Heat	Country	Cyclists	Result	Notes
1	6	Great Britain	Chris Hoy; Jason Kenny; Jamie Staff	42.950	Q, WR
2	7	France	Grégory Baugé; Kévin Sireau; Arnaud Tournant	43.541	Q
3	6	Germany	René Enders; Maximilian Levy; Stefan Nimke	44.197	Q
4	7	Netherlands	Theo Bos; Teun Mulder; Tim Veldt	44.213	Q
5	5	Australia	Daniel Ellis; Mark French; Shane Kelly	44.335	Q
6	1	Japan	Kiyofumi Nagai; Tomohiro Nagatsuka; Kazunari Watanabe	44.454	Q
7	3	Malaysia	Azizulhasni Awang; Josiah Ng; Mohd Rizal Tisin	44.752	Q
8	2	United States	Michael Blatchford; Adam Duvendeck; Giddeon Massie	45.346	Q
9	4	China	Feng Yong; Li Wenhao; Zhang Lei	45.556	
10	3	Greece	Athanasios Mantzouranis; Vasileios Reppas; Panagiotis Voukelatos	45.645	
11	2	Czech Republic	Tomáš Bábek; Adam Ptáčník; Denis Špička	45.678	
12	5	Russia	Sergey Polynskiy; Denis Dmitriev; Sergey Kucherov	45.964	
13	1	Poland	Maciej Bielecki; Kamil Kuczyński; Łukasz Kwiatkowski	45.266	

=== First round ===
Rank	Heat	Country	Cyclists	Result	Notes
1	4	Great Britain	Chris Hoy; Jason Kenny; Jamie Staff	43.034	Q
2	3	France	Grégory Baugé; Kévin Sireau; Arnaud Tournant	43.656	Q
3	2	Germany	René Enders; Maximilian Levy; Stefan Nimke	43.699	Q
4	1	Australia	Daniel Ellis; Mark French; Shane Kelly	44.090	Q, OC
5	1	Netherlands	Theo Bos; Teun Mulder; Tim Veldt	44.212	
6	2	Japan	Kiyofumi Nagai; Tomohiro Nagatsuka; Kazunari Watanabe	44.437	NR
7	3	Malaysia	Azizulhasni Awang; Josiah Ng; Mohd Rizal Tisin	44.822	
8	4	United States	Michael Blatchford; Adam Duvendeck; Giddeon Massie	45.423	

=== Medal round ===
Bronze medal final

Rank	Country	Cyclists	Result	Notes
3rd place, bronze medalist(s)	Germany	René Enders; Maximilian Levy; Stefan Nimke	44.014	
4	Australia	Daniel Ellis; Mark French; Shane Kelly	44.022	OC

Gold medal final

Rank	Country	Cyclists	Result	Notes
1st place, gold medalist(s)	Great Britain	Chris Hoy; Jason Kenny; Jamie Staff	43.128	
2nd place, silver medalist(s)	France	Grégory Baugé; Kévin Sireau; Arnaud Tournant	43.651	
