= Michael Blatchford =

American cyclist (born 1986)

Personal information
- Full name: Michael Benjamin Blatchford
- Born: January 29, 1986 (age 40) Cypress, California, U.S.
- Height: 5 ft 10 in (178 cm)
- Weight: 181 lb (82 kg)

Cycling career
- Sport: Cycling
- Discipline: Track
- Role: Rider
- Rider type: Sprinter

Professional teams
- 2008: Cody Racing
- 2011–2012: Project London 2012
Medal record
Men's track cycling
Representing the United States
Pan American Games
Silver medal – second place	2011 Guadalajara	Team sprint
Pan American Championships
Gold medal – first place	2007 Valencia	Sprint
Gold medal – first place	2012 Mar del Plata	Team sprint
Silver medal – second place	2007 Valencia	Team sprint
Silver medal – second place	2011 Medellin	Team sprint
Bronze medal – third place	2005 Mar del Plata	Sprint
Bronze medal – third place	2005 Mar del Plata	Team sprint
Bronze medal – third place	2006 São Paulo	Team sprint

Michael Benjamin Blatchford (born January 29, 1986, in Cypress, California) is an American professional track cyclist. Considered one of the youngest and most dynamic American sprinters on the present-day track circuit, Blatchford has held two Pan American and four U.S. national championship titles in his career resume since he scored his first triumph as an eighteen-year-old junior in 2004. He also represented the United States at the 2008 Summer Olympics and eventually led off the Americans for the silver medal in men's team sprint at the 2011 Pan American Games. Blatchford currently races for Project London 2012 pro cycling team, and works as a resident athlete for the U.S. Olympic Training Center in Colorado Springs, Colorado.

== Racing career ==
Growing up in Cypress, California, where he was home-schooled through high school, Blatchford started his cycling career at age thirteen, when he first discovered the now-defunct Olympic Velodrome that hosted the track cycling tournament at the 1984 Summer Olympics. Blatchford's visit and fascination had thereby inspired him to become a track sprinter, and eventually claimed the silver medal at the 2004 UCI Junior World Championships in Los Angeles. On that same year, he outclassed Giddeon Massie and Christian Stahl for an elite U.S. national title in men's sprint that officially marked his debut as a force to be reckoned with on the domestic and international track cycling scene.

Shortly after his early success, Blatchford became one of the resident athletes of the U.S. Olympic Training Center in Colorado Springs, Colorado. His sporting career continued to flourish with a bronze medal in men's sprint at the 2006 UCI World Cup series in Los Angeles, followed by an impressive, gold medal effort for the U.S. cycling team at the 2007 Pan American Road and Track Championships in Valencia, Venezuela.

With an aim on the team sprint event for the Olympics in 2008, Blatchford teamed up with Olympians Massie and Adam Duvendeck to set a new U.S. record of 45.128 seconds at the UCI World Championships in Manchester, England.

Following a stunning performance from the World Championships, Blatchford qualified for two track cycling events at the 2008 Summer Olympics in Beijing by recording the fastest entry time, and earning an automatic berth from the USA Cycling Team's Selection Camp. In the men's team sprint, held on the first day of the track program, Blatchford helped his teammates Massie and Duvendeck set an eighth-place time in 45.346 (an average speed of 59.542 km/h) on the morning prelims before they were knocked off by the Brits (led by Olympic legend Chris Hoy) in the first round. Two days later, in the men's sprint, Blatchford lost his round-of-sixteen match-up against France's Kévin Sireau, and finished second in his repechage heat behind Japan's Kazunari Watanabe, thus eliminating him from the tournament. Earlier in the morning session, Blatchford grabbed a fifteenth seed with a time of 10.470.

In 2009, Blatchford immediately took up a two-year sabbatical from the sport, when the U.S. cycling team disbanded the sprint program in track cycling. By early 2011, he came out of an early retirement to join with four other riders for Project London 2012, an elite track cycling team, inspired and created by Rubicon Cycling LCC, that fosters the youth to become champion professional athletes, fulfilling their dream to represent the United States at the Olympic Games.

Returning from two years off the sport, Blatchford managed to reclaim the men's sprint titles (both individual and team) at the 2011 U.S. Track Cycling Championships, and further continued his stellar ride as part of the team that registered an American record of 44.036 and earned a silver medal at the Pan American Games in Guadalajara, Mexico. Having been chosen by USA Cycling to be eligible for team selection, Blatchford sought his official bid to compete for the 2012 Summer Olympics, but he was shortlisted.

== Career highlights ==
2004

- (gold) U.S. Track Cycling Championships (Sprint), Frisco, Texas (USA)
- (silver) UCI Junior Track World Championships (Sprint), Los Angeles, California (USA)

2005

- (gold) U.S. Track Cycling Championships (250 m sprint), Los Angeles, California (USA)
- (bronze) Pan American Championships (Sprint), Mar del Plata (ARG)
- (bronze) Pan American Championships (Team sprint), Mar del Plata (ARG)

2006

- (gold) U.S. Track Cycling Championships (Team sprint), Los Angeles, California (USA)
- (bronze) U.S. Track Cycling Championships (Sprint), Los Angeles, California (USA)
- (bronze) Stage 3, UCI World Cup (Team sprint), Carson, California (USA)

2007

- (gold) U.S. Track Cycling Championships (250 m sprint), Carson, California (USA)
- (gold) U.S. Track Cycling Championships (Sprint), Carson, California (USA)
- (silver) U.S. Track Cycling Championships (Team sprint), Los Angeles, California (USA)

2008

- (gold) U.S. Track Cycling Championships (250 m sprint), Carson, California (USA)
- 8th Olympic Games (Team sprint with Adam Duvendeck and Giddeon Massie), Beijing (CHN)
- 10th UCI World Championships (Team sprint with Adam Duvendeck and Giddeon Massie), Manchester (GBR)
- 15th Olympic Games (Sprint), Beijing (CHN)

2011

- (gold) U.S. Track Cycling Championships (Team sprint with Dean Tracy and Kevin Mansker), Carson, California (USA)
- (silver) Pan American Games (Team sprint with Jimmy Watkins and Dean Tracy), Guadalajara (MEX)
