= Adam Ptáčník =

Czech cyclist

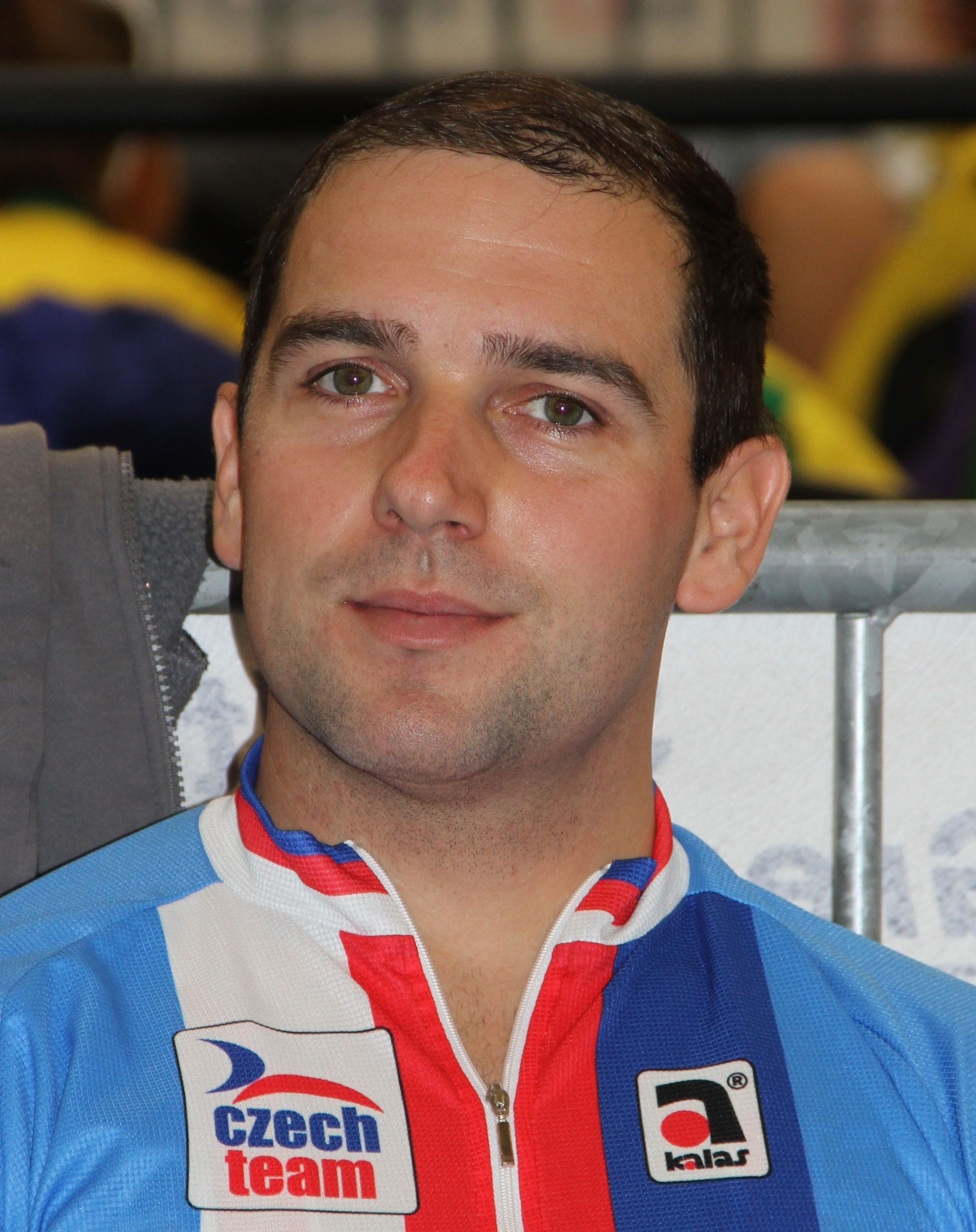
- Ptáčník at the 2015 UEC European Track Championships

Personal information
- Full name: Adam Ptáčník
- Born: 4 December 1985 (age 40) Pardubice, Czechoslovakia
- Height: 1.77 m (5 ft 10 in)
- Weight: 90 kg (198 lb)

Cycling career
- Sport: Cycling
- Discipline: Track
- Role: Rider
- Rider type: Sprinter
Medal record
Men's track cycling
Representing Czech Republic
European Championships
Bronze medal – third place	2003 Moscow	Team sprint
Bronze medal – third place	2005 Fiorenzuola	Keirin
Bronze medal – third place	2005 Fiorenzuola	Team sprint
Bronze medal – third place	2010 Pruszków	Keirin

Adam Ptáčník (Czech pronunciation: [ˈadam ˈptaːtʃɲiːk]; born 4 December 1985 in Pardubice) is a Czech amateur track cyclist. He shared the men's sprint title with Tomáš Bábek and Denis Špička at the Czech Track Cycling Championships, and later represented the Czech Republic at the 2008 Summer Olympics. Ptacnik also won two bronze medals each in Keirin and team sprint at the 2005 European Junior Championships in Fiorenzuola, Italy.

Ptacnik qualified for the Czech squad in two track cycling events at the 2008 Summer Olympics in Beijing by receiving one of the team's three available berths based on UCI's selection process from the Track World Rankings. In the men's team sprint, held on the first day of the program, Ptacnik and his teammates Babek and Spicka battled in an opening heat against the U.S. trio of Michael Blatchford, Giddeon Massie, and Adam Duvendeck with an eleventh-place time in 45.678 and an average speed of 59.109 km/h, failing to advance further to the top eight match round. Two days later, in the men's sprint, Ptacnik narrowly missed out the round-of-sixteen matchup by a four-thousandth second margin on the morning prelims in 10.569, finishing nineteenth overall in the process.

At the 2010 European Track Championships in Pruszków, Poland, Ptacnik overhauled the French duo François Pervis and Michael D'Almeida on the final stretch to grab the bronze medal in men's Keirin.

== Career highlights ==
2003

- (bronze) European Junior Championships (Team sprint), Moscow (RUS)

2005

- (silver) Czech Track Cycling Championships (1 km time trial), Prague (CZE)
- (bronze) Czech Track Cycling Championships (Sprint), Prague (CZE)
- (bronze) European Junior Championships (Keirin), Fiorenzuola (ITA)
- (bronze) European Junior Championships (Team sprint), Fiorenzuola (ITA)
- (bronze) Stage 1, UCI World Cup (1 km time trial), Moscow (RUS)

2008

- (gold) Czech Track Cycling Championships (Team sprint with Tomáš Bábek and Denis Špička), Brno (CZE)
- 11th Olympic Games (Team sprint with Tomáš Bábek and Denis Špička), Beijing (CHN)
- 19th Olympic Games (Sprint), Beijing (CHN)

2010

- (bronze) European Championships (Keirin), Pruszków (POL)
- 12th UCI World Championships (Team sprint), Copenhagen (DEN)
- 26th UCI World Championships (Keirin), Copenhagen (DEN)
- 33rd UCI World Championships (Sprint), Copenhagen (DEN)

2011

- (gold) Czech Track Cycling Championships (Team sprint), Prague (CZE)
- (silver) Czech Track Cycling Championships (Sprint), Prague (CZE)
- (bronze) Czech Track Cycling Championships (Keirin), Prague (CZE)

2013

- (gold) Czech Track Cycling Championships (Keirin), Brno (CZE)
