= Filip Ditzel =

Czech track cyclist

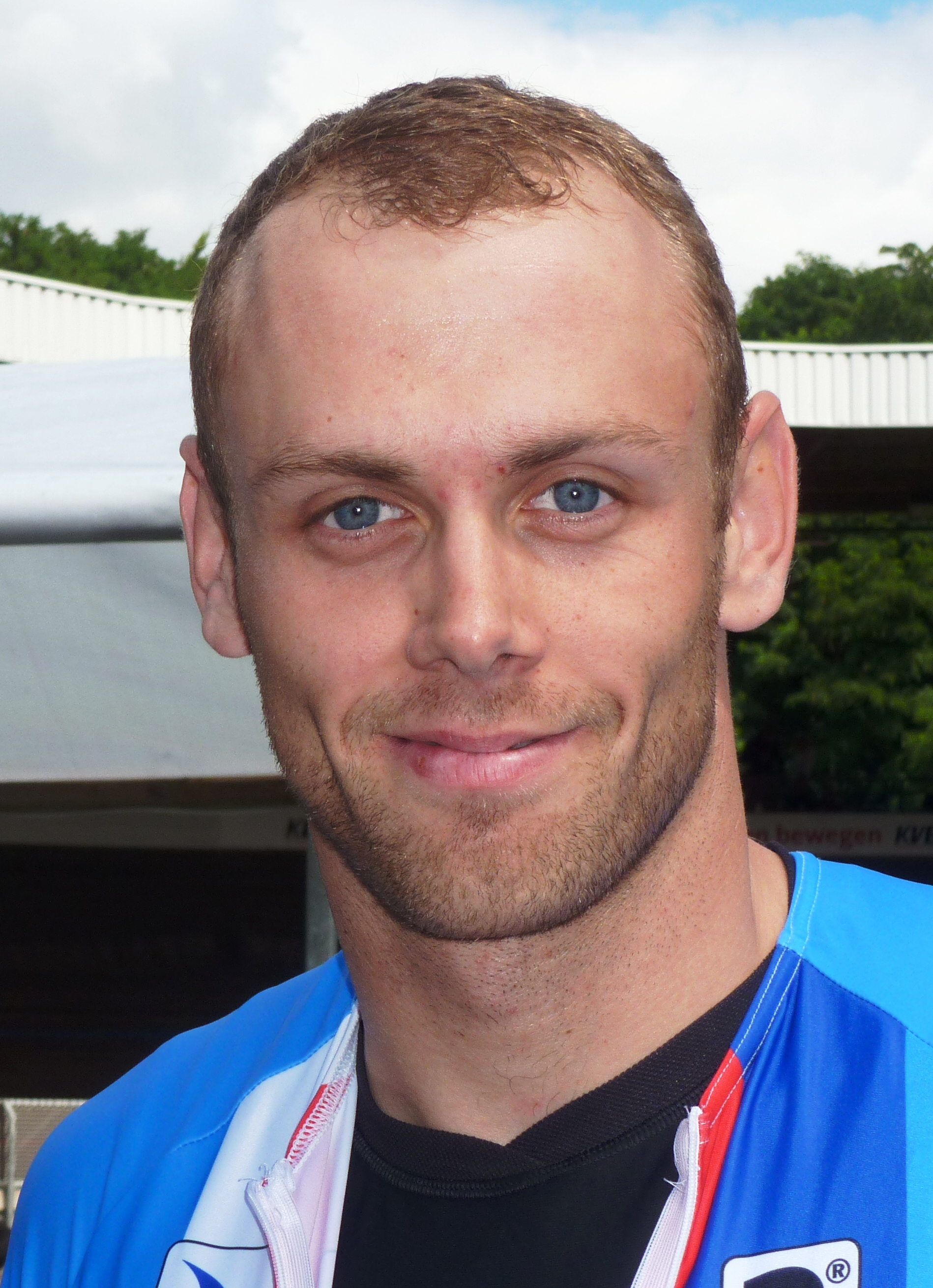
- Filip Ditzel (2012)

Personal information
- Born: 8 December 1985 (age 40)

Cycling career
- Sport: Cycling
- Discipline: Track cycling
- Role: Rider
- Rider type: sprinter

Filip Ditzel (born 8 December 1985) is a Czech male track cyclist. He competed in three events at the 2012 UCI Track Cycling World Championships. Ditzel is World champion and still unsurpassed world record holder for fixed kilometer in the junior category.
