= Kévin Sireau =

French cyclist

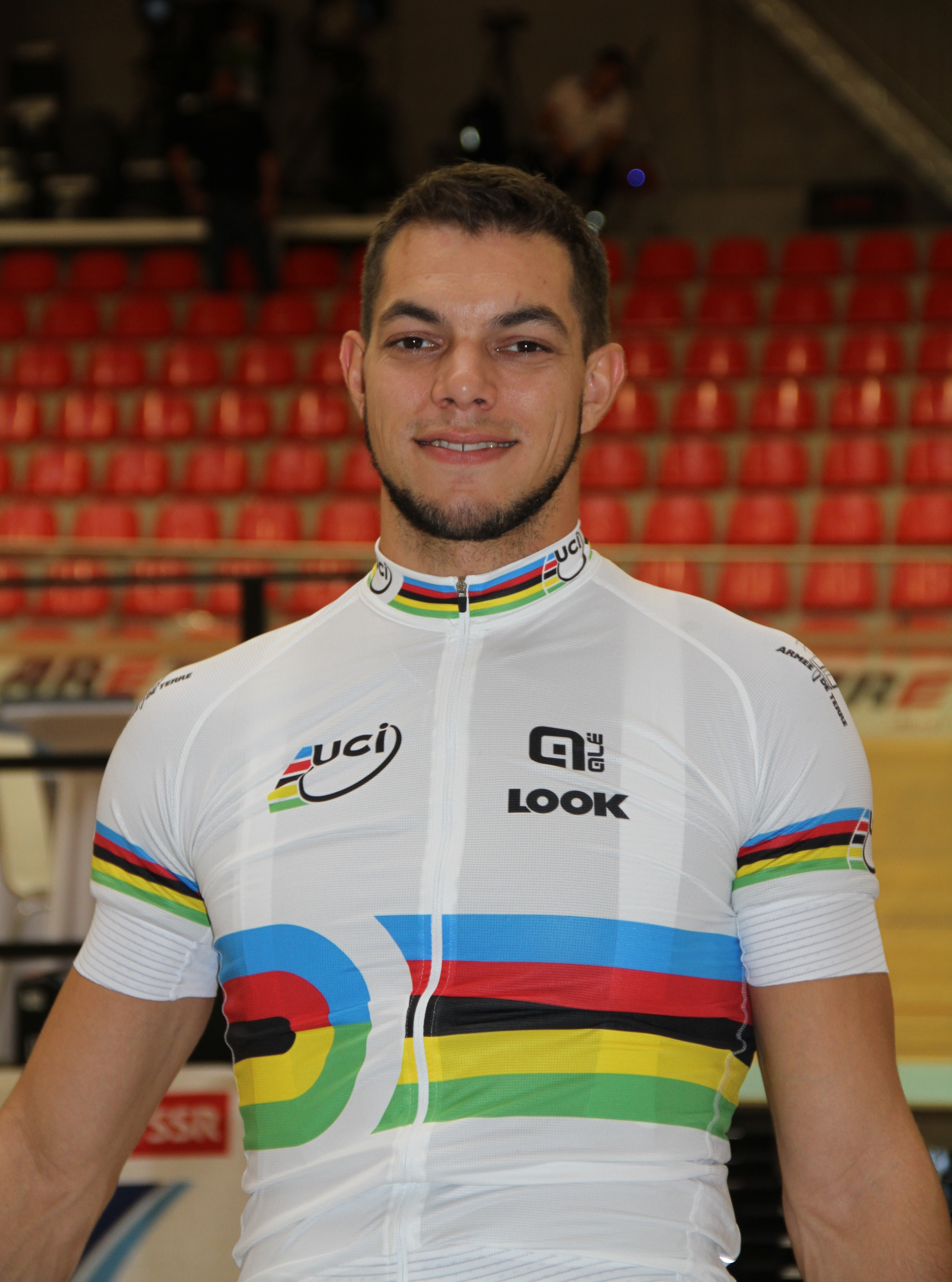
- Sireau at the 2015 UEC European Track Championships

Personal information
- Born: 18 April 1987 (age 39) Châteauroux, France

Cycling career
- Sport: Cycling
- Discipline: Track
- Role: Rider
- Rider type: Sprinter

Professional teams
- 2015: Armée de Terre
- 2017: Armée de Terre
Medal record
Representing France
Men's track cycling
Olympic Games
Silver medal – second place	2008 Beijing	Team sprint
Silver medal – second place	2012 London	Team sprint
World Championships
Gold medal – first place	2008 Manchester	Team sprint
Gold medal – first place	2009 Pruszków	Team sprint
Gold medal – first place	2015 Yvelines	Team sprint
Silver medal – second place	2008 Manchester	Sprint
Silver medal – second place	2010 Ballerup	Team Sprint
Silver medal – second place	2012 Melbourne	Team sprint
Bronze medal – third place	2009 Pruszków	Sprint
Bronze medal – third place	2010 Ballerup	Sprint
Bronze medal – third place	2014 Cali	Team sprint
Disqualified	2011 Apeldoorn	Team sprint
European Championships
Gold medal – first place	2011 Apeldoorn	Sprint
Silver medal – second place	2010 Pruszków	Sprint
Silver medal – second place	2010 Pruszków	Team Sprint
Silver medal – second place	2011 Apeldoorn	Team sprint

Kévin Sireau (born 18 April 1987) is a French professional racing cyclist. He's currently coaching the Indian cycling team.

== Major results ==
2003
3rd Sprint, French National Track Championships, Novice
2004
2nd Sprint, French National Track Championships, Junior
2005
1st Kilo, French National Track Championships, Junior
1st Sprint, French National Track Championships, Junior
1st (France) Team Sprint, French National Track Championships, Senior
1st Team Sprint, European Track Championships, Junior
2nd Sprint, European Track Championships, Junior
2nd Team Sprint, UCI Track Cycling World Championships, Junior
2nd Kilo, UCI Track Cycling World Championships, Junior
2nd Sprint, UCI Track Cycling World Championships, Junior
2006
2nd Kilo, French National Track Championships
1st Sprint, French National Track Championships
1st Keirin, French National Track Championships
2nd Kilo, UCI Track World Cup, Moscow (RUS)
3rd Team Sprint, UCI Track World Cup, Moscow (RUS)
2007
2nd Team Sprint, UCI Track World Cup, Los Angeles (USA)
2nd Sprint, European Track Championships, U23
1st Keirin, European Track Championships, U23
2nd Sprint, French National Track Championships
3rd Team Sprint, UCI Track World Cup, Sydney (AUS)
2nd Sprint, UCI Track World Cup, Sydney (AUS)
2008
1st Team Sprint, UCI Track World Cup, Los Angeles (USA)
2nd Sprint, UCI Track World Cup, Los Angeles (USA)
1st Sprint, European Track Championships
2009
1st Sprint, European Track Championships
1st Team Sprint, European Track Championships
World Record, Flying 200m time trial (9.572 seconds in Moscow, Russia on 30 May 2009)
2nd Sprint, French National Track Championships
3rd Keirin, French National Track Championships
1st Sprint 2008–09 UCI Track Cycling World Ranking
1st Team sprint 2008–09 UCI Track Cycling World Ranking
2010
1st Sprint, French National Track Championships
1st Keirin, French National Track Championships
1st Sprint 2009–10 UCI Track Cycling World Ranking
1st Team sprint 2009–10 UCI Track Cycling World Ranking
2011
1st Sprint, European Track Championships
1st Sprint 2010–11 UCI Track Cycling World Ranking
1st Team sprint 2010–11 UCI Track Cycling World Ranking
2014
1st Team sprint, Fenioux Piste International
2nd Keirin, Fenioux Piste International

Records
Preceded by Theo Bos	Men's 200 meter Time Trial world record holder 29 May 2009 – 2013	Succeeded by Francois Pervis
