= Adam Duvendeck =

American cyclist (born 1981)

Personal information
- Full name: Jeremy Adam Duvendeck
- Born: October 28, 1981 (age 45) Santa Barbara, California, U.S.
- Height: 5 ft 11 in (1.80 m)
- Weight: 194 lb (88 kg)

Cycling career
- Sport: Cycling
- Discipline: Track
- Role: Rider
- Rider type: Sprinter

Amateur team
- 2002–2008: Momentum Cycling Team

Professional team
- 2001: NetZero Cycling Team

Jeremy Adam Duvendeck (born October 28, 1981, in Santa Barbara, California) is a retired American professional track cyclist. He represented the United States in two editions of the Olympic Games (2004 and 2008), and later claimed two elite national titles each in men's sprint (2003) and Keirin (2006) at the U.S. Track Cycling Championships. Before retiring to focus on his coaching career in 2009, Duvendeck rode for the Momentum Cycling Team.

== Racing career ==
As a multi-sport athlete during his early years in Santa Barbara, California, Duvendeck had been competing numerous times in baseball, soccer, tennis, and volleyball until he began his cycling career as a cross-country mountain biker at the age of thirteen. After spending a year in off-road racing, Duvendeck purchased his first road bike, and instead made a decision to focus instead on track cycling under the guidance of his personal coach and 1984 Olympian Rory O'Reilly. Four years later, Duvendeck sought sporting headlines on the domestic cycling scene with a surprising triumph in the men's kilometre time trial at the 1999 USA Cycling Junior Track Championships. Following his early success, Duvendeck continued to display his versatility as a solid, all-around track cyclist by adding the U.S. men's team sprint title to his career hardware in 2003.

An official member of the USA Cycling team, Duvendeck made his worldwide debut at the 2004 Summer Olympics in Athens, where he finished eleventh in the men's team sprint (45.742), along with his teammates Christian Stahl and Giddeon Massie.

Shortly after his first Olympics, Duvendeck took a break from competitive cycling to pursue his studies in kinesiology at Santa Barbara City College. Upon returning to a relatively leisure schedule from his two-year education in 2006, Duvendeck refocused his efforts on other sprint events, such as Keirin and sprint, since the removal of the kilometre time trial from the Olympic program. Moreover, he chased his Olympic teammate Massie for the men's Keirin title at the U.S. Track Cycling Championships.

Duvendeck qualified for his second U.S. squad, as a 26-year-old, in the men's team sprint at the 2008 Summer Olympics in Beijing by receiving an automatic berth from the USA Cycling Team's Selection Camp. He helped his teammates Massie and Michael Blatchford set an eighth-place time in 45.346 (an average speed of 59.542 km/h) on the morning prelims before losing out to the Brits (led by Olympic legend Chris Hoy) in the first round.

In early 2009, Duvendeck officially retired from competitive cycling to further pursue his career as a head coach of the UC Santa Barbara cycling team, as a track director for the USA Cycling team, and eventually, as a manager for Anschutz Entertainment Group at the Velo Sports Centre in Carson, California. Additionally, Duvendeck starred in the reality TV series The Bachelorette (season 5), where he was one of ten bachelors to be sent home early in the season's first rose ceremony.

== Post-racing career ==
In September 2025, Duvendeck was named General Manager of Dignity Health Sports Park in Carson, California.

== Career highlights ==
2002

- (silver) U.S. Track Cycling Championships (1 km time trial), United States

2003

- (gold) U.S. Track Cycling Championships (Team sprint), United States

2004

- 11th Olympic Games (Team sprint with Giddeon Massie and Christian Stahl), Athens (GRE)

2006

- (gold) U.S. Track Cycling Championships (Keirin), Los Angeles, California (USA)
- (silver) U.S. Track Cycling Championships (Sprint), Los Angeles, California (USA)
- (silver) U.S. Track Cycling Championships (Team sprint), Los Angeles, California (USA)

2007

- (silver) U.S. Track Cycling Championships (Team sprint), Carson, California (USA)
- (bronze) U.S. Track Cycling Championships (Sprint), Carson, California (USA)

2008

- 8th Olympic Games (Team sprint with Michael Blatchford and Giddeon Massie), Beijing (CHN)
