= Carlos Urán =

Colombian cyclist (born 1980)

Personal information
- Full name: Carlos Alberto Urán
- Born: January 6, 1980 (age 46) Urrao, Colombia

Cycling career
- Sport: Cycling
- Current team: Team Manzana Postobón
- Disciplines: Road, track
- Role: Rider
- Rider type: Sprinter

Professional team
- 2012–: 472-Colombia
Medal record
Men's track cycling
Representing Colombia
Pan American Championships
Gold medal – first place	2008 Montevideo	Omnium
Gold medal – first place	2008 Montevideo	Team pursuit
Gold medal – first place	2010 Aguascalientes	Omnium
Gold medal – first place	2011 Medellin	Scratch
Bronze medal – third place	2008 Montevideo	Bronze
Bronze medal – third place	2011 Medellin	Omnium

Carlos Alberto Urán (born January 6, 1980 in Urrao, Colombia) is a Colombian cyclist riding for Team Manzana Postobón.

== Palmares ==
2008
1st team pursuit, Pan American Road and Track Championships
1st omnium, Pan American Road and Track Championships
3rd scratch, Pan American Road and Track Championships
2010
1st omnium, Pan American Road and Track Championships
1st omnium, South American Games
2011
1st scratch, Pan American Road and Track Championships
3rd omnium, Pan American Road and Track Championships
2012
1st stage 1 Vuelta a Colombia
