= Łukasz Bujko =

Polish cyclist

Personal information
- Born: 15 April 1986 (age 40)

Cycling career
- Sport: Cycling
- Discipline: Track cycling
- Role: Rider
- Rider type: endurance

Łukasz Bujko (born 15 April 1986) is a Polish male track cyclist, riding for the national team. He competed in the three events at the 2010 UCI Track Cycling World Championships.
