= Clemens Selzer =

Austrian track cyclist

Personal information
- Born: 26 July 1985 (age 41)

Cycling career
- Sport: Cycling
- Discipline: Track cycling
- Role: Rider
- Rider type: sprinter

Clemens Selzer (born 26 July 1985) is an Austrian male track cyclist, riding for the national team. He competed in the sprint and 1 km time trial event at the 2010 UCI Track Cycling World Championships.
