= Valery Kaykov =

Russian cyclist

Personal information
- Born: 7 May 1988 (age 38)

Cycling career
- Sport: Cycling
- Role: Rider

Professional team
- 2012-2013: RusVelo

Valery Kaykov (born 7 May 1988) is a Russian former professional racing cyclist.

== Track ==
In 2010 Kaykov won the individual pursuit at the U-23 European Track Championships. He was also part of the Russian team that won the team pursuit. At the 2011 European Track Championships Kaykov took bronze with the Russian team in the team pursuit. Kaykov was on the Russian team that won the team pursuit at the 2012 European Track Championships. He also took silver with Artur Ershov in the madison event.

== Road ==
Kaykov joined pro continental team RusVelo in 2012. His best result of the season was in the time trail at Russian Championships where he came 3rd, only beaten by Denis Menchov and Dimitry Sokolov.

== Doping ==
Kaykov tested positive for the black market drug GW501516 in an out-of-competition control on 17 March 2013, and was subsequently handed a two-year ban from sports. He was also sacked by RusVelo.
