= Giddeon Massie =

American cyclist

Personal information
- Full name: Giddeon Massie
- Born: August 27, 1981 (age 45) Bethlehem, Pennsylvania, U.S.
- Height: 6 ft 3 in (191 cm)
- Weight: 209 lb (95 kg)

Cycling career
- Sport: Cycling
- Discipline: Track
- Role: Rider
- Rider type: Sprinter

Professional teams
- 2007–2008: SPIKE
- 2009–: Bike Religion
Medal record
Men's track cycling
Representing the United States
Pan American Games
Gold medal – first place	2003 Santo Domingo	Keirin
Silver medal – second place	2003 Santo Domingo	Sprint

Giddeon Massie (born August 27, 1981, in Bethlehem, Pennsylvania) is an American professional track cyclist. He collected two medals (silver and bronze) each in men's Keirin and sprint at the 2003 Pan American Games, and later represented the United States in two editions of the Olympic Games (2004 and 2008). Massie has been considered one of the best American track sprinters on the domestic and international circuits, having awarded a conglomerate of twenty U.S. championship titles since his sporting debut in 2001. At the peak of his career, Massie currently races for the Bike Religion pro cycling team, and works as a resident athlete for the U.S. Olympic Training Center in Colorado Springs, Colorado.

== Racing career ==
Born and raised in Bethlehem, Pennsylvania to Mike and Robin Massie, Massie had been playing baseball and basketball throughout his early childhood. He discovered cycling as a ten-year-old upon entering the Air Products Development Program, a free sporting institution in Trexlertown, Pennsylvania that highly fostered people of all ages to take up track cycling. Since then, he finished his junior career fifth in the world, and earned two U.S. national titles, and top finishes at the UCI World Cup series. Off the sport, Massie also attended the Faith Christian Academy in Sellersville, Pennsylvania, where he enrolled on a music scholarship from the U.S. National Band Association for his talent in clarinet, an instrument that had been inherited by his father.

In 2003, Massie moved to Colorado Springs, Colorado, where he trained and worked as a resident athlete for the U.S. Olympic Training Center and has been continuously lived until the present. On that same year, Massie also claimed the gold medal in men's Keirin and silver in men's sprint when he competed for the first time on the international scene at the Pan American Games in Santo Domingo, Dominican Republic.

A full-time member of the USA Cycling team, Massie made his worldwide debut at the 2004 Summer Olympics in Athens, where he finished eleventh in the men's team sprint (45.742), along with his teammates Christian Stahl and Adam Duvendeck.

At the 2008 Summer Olympics in Beijing, Massie qualified for his second U.S. squad, as a 26-year-old, in two track cycling events by receiving an automatic berth from the USA Cycling Team's Selection Camp. In the men's team sprint, held on the first day of the program, Massie helped his teammates Duvendeck and Michael Blatchford set an eighth-place time in 45.346 (an average speed of 59.542 km/h) on the morning prelims before losing out to the Brits (led by Olympic legend Chris Hoy) in the first round. The following day, in the men's keirin, Massie narrowly missed the second spot taken by the Netherlands' Theo Bos in his opening heat and finished fourth in the repechage against five other cyclists, thus eliminating him from the competition with a twenty-first place overall.

In 2009, Massie recovered from his second Olympic setback by achieving three more track cycling titles in Keirin, the 250 m standing start, and the now-defunct kilometre time trial at the U.S. Championships in Carson, California. He continued to flourish his sporting career by adding two more national titles to his career resume and mounting a second-place finish in men's sprint, won by his former Olympic teammate Blatchford, on the same tournament in 2011, earning him a guaranteed place on the USA Cycling team for his third Olympic bid.

Despite being shortlisted on the list for the 2012 Summer Olympics, Massie managed to defend his titles in both Keirin and time trial at the U.S. Championships for a total of twenty, making him one of the most successful U.S. track cyclists of all time.

== Anti-drug campaign ==
Shortly after his first Olympics in 2004, Massie was selected by the U.S. Anti-Doping Agency to participate in a series public service announcements that promoted clean, honest, and fair competition with the theme: My Health. My Sport. My Victory. I Compete Clean. This campaign had been truly inspired by Massie's surprising triumphs at the Pan American Games, following an immediate call of Barbadian sprinter Barry Forde to further strip off his medals for failing the doping test. Moreover, Massie and his Olympic teammate Duvendeck co-founded Focus 2004, a track cycling team that encouraged young athletes and professionals to eliminate doping and the use of performance-enhancing drugs from the sport.

== Career highlights ==
2001

- (silver) U.S. Track Cycling Championships (Sprint), Frisco, Texas (USA)

2003

- (gold) Pan American Games (Keirin), Santo Domingo (DOM)
- (silver) Pan American Games (Sprint), Santo Domingo (DOM)

2004

- (silver) U.S. Track Cycling Championships (Sprint), Frisco, Texas (USA)
- 11th Olympic Games (Team sprint with Adam Duvendeck and Christian Stahl), Athens (GRE)

2005

- (silver) U.S. Track Cycling Championships (Team sprint), Carson, California (USA)
- 5th Stage 2, UCI World Cup (Team sprint), Manchester (GBR)

2006

- (gold) U.S. Track Cycling Championships (250 m sprint), Los Angeles, California (USA)
- (gold) U.S. Track Cycling Championships (Sprint), Los Angeles, California (USA)
- (gold) U.S. Track Cycling Championships (Team sprint), Los Angeles, California (USA)
- (bronze) U.S. Track Cycling Championships (Keirin), Los Angeles, California (USA)
- (bronze) Pan American Championships (Sprint), São Paulo (BRA)
- (bronze) Pan American Championships (Team sprint), São Paulo (BRA)
- 4th Stage 3, UCI World Cup (Team sprint), Carson, California (USA)
- 12th Stage 3, UCI World Cup (Keirin), Carson, California (USA)

2007

- (gold) U.S. Track Cycling Championships (Sprint), Los Angeles, California (USA)
- (gold) U.S. Track Cycling Championships (Team sprint), Los Angeles, California (USA)
- (gold) Pan American Championships (Keirin), Valencia (VEN)
- (bronze) U.S. Track Cycling Championships (250 m sprint), Los Angeles, California (USA)

2008

- 8th Olympic Games (Team sprint with Michael Blatchford and Adam Duvendeck), Beijing (CHN)
- 21st Olympic Games (Keirin), Beijing (CHN)

2009

- (gold) U.S. Track Cycling Championships (250 m sprint), Carson, California (USA)
- (gold) U.S. Track Cycling Championships (Keirin), Carson, California (USA)
- (gold) U.S. Track Cycling Championships (Team sprint), Carson, California (USA)
- (silver) U.S. Track Cycling Championships (Sprint), Carson, California (USA)
- 6th Stage 2, UCI World Cup (1 km time trial), Melbourne (AUS)
- 12th Stage 2, UCI World Cup (Keirin), Melbourne (AUS)

2010

- (gold) U.S. Track Cycling Championships (1 km time trial), Carson, California (USA)
- (gold) U.S. Track Cycling Championships (Sprint), Carson, California (USA)
- (gold) U.S. Track Cycling Championships (Team sprint), Carson, California (USA)
- (silver) U.S. Track Cycling Championships (Keirin), Carson, California (USA)
- 11th Stage 4, UCI World Cup (1 km time trial), Beijing (CHN)
- 11th Stage 4, UCI World Cup (Points race), Beijing (CHN)
- 13th Stage 3, UCI World Cup (Keirin), Cali (COL)
- 40th UCI World Championships (Sprint), Copenhagen (DEN)

2011

- (gold) U.S. Track Cycling Championships (1 km time trial), Carson, California (USA)
- (gold) U.S. Track Cycling Championships (Keirin), Carson, California (USA)
- (silver) U.S. Track Cycling Championships (Sprint), Carson, California (USA)
- (silver) U.S. Track Cycling Championships (Team sprint), Carson, California (USA)
- 12th UCI World Championships (Team sprint), Apeldoorn (NED)
- 27th UCI World Championships (Sprint), Apeldoorn (NED)

2012

- (gold) U.S. Track Cycling Championships (Keirin), Carson, California (USA)
- (gold) U.S. Track Cycling Championships (Team sprint), Carson, California (USA)
- (bronze) U.S. Track Cycling Championships (1 km time trial), Carson, California (USA)
- (bronze) U.S. Track Cycling Championships (Sprint), Carson, California (USA)
