= Christian Stahl =

American cyclist

Personal information
- Full name: Christian Stahl
- Born: May 24, 1983 (age 43) Bethany, Connecticut United States of America
- Height: 5 ft 10 in (178 cm)
- Weight: 175 lb (79 kg)

Cycling career
- Sport: Cycling
- Discipline: Track
- Role: Rider
- Rider type: Sprinter

Amateur teams
- US National Team
- Mike Fraysse Sports

Major wins
- 2005 US National Track Cycling Championships, Team Sprint; 2004 Pan American Championships, Kilo; 2003 Pan-Am Games Qualifier, Team Sprint
Medal record
Representing United States
Pan American Games
Silver medal – second place	2003 Santo Domingo	Time trial

Christian Stahl (born May 24, 1983) is an American racing cyclist. He was a member of the 2004 US Olympic Cycling Team, and competed in the team sprint. Stahl earned his Olympic selection along with Adam Duvendeck and Giddeon Massie, who finished ninth in the World Cup overall team standings in 2004.

== Palmares ==
2003

- USCF National Track Champion, Team Sprint
- 5th - USCF Track National Championships, Match Sprint
- 6th - USCF Track National Championships, Kilometer TT
- 2nd - Pan American Games, Kilometer TT, Santo Domingo, DOM
- 4th - Pan American Games, Team Sprint, Santo Domingo, DOM
- 19th - UCI Elite World Track Championships, Kilometer TT, Stuggart, GER
- 1st - AVC #4 Pan-Am Games & Worlds qualifier, Kilometer TT, CO Springs, Colo.
- 1st - AVC #4 Pan-Am Games & Worlds qualifier, Team Sprint, CO Springs, Colo.
- 8th - AVC #3 World Cup qualifier, Kilometer TT, Frisco, Texas
- 1st - AVC #3 World Cup qualifier, Team Sprint, Frisco, Texas
- 1st - AVC #2 World Cup qualifier, Kilometer TT, Ft. Lauderdale, Fla.
- 1st - AVC #2 World Cup qualifier, Team Sprint, Ft. Lauderdale, Fla.

2004

- Gold medal - Pan American Championships, Kilo
- 11th - UCI World Track Championships, Team Sprint 18th- UCI World Track Championships, Kilo 13th - UCI Track World Cup, RUS, Kilo
- 10th - UCI Track World Cup, MEX, Kilo
- 7th - UCI Track World Cup, GBR, Kilo
- 8th - UCI Track World Cup, GBR, Team Sprint
- 9th - UCI Track World Cup, AUS, Kilo
- 7th - UCI Track World Cup, AUS, Team Sprint
- Pan American Championships gold medalist, Kilo

2005

- 2nd - L.A. Cycling Classic - Match Sprint
- 1st - Elite National Track Championships - Team Sprint
- 4th - Elite National Track Championships - Sprint
- 1st - Elite National Track Championships - Kilo TT
- 1st - Elite National Track Championships - Kilo TT Espoir
- 6th - Elite National Track Championships - - Keirin
