= Sergey Kucherov =

Russian racing cyclist (1980–2026)

Sergey Vyacheslavovich Kucherov (Russian: Сергей Вячеславович Кучеров; 18 July 1980 – 20 October 2026) was a Russian track cyclist. At the 2008 and 2012 Summer Olympics, he competed in the Men's team sprint for the national team. They finished 12th and 7th respectively.

Kucherov served in the Russian Armed Forces and fought in the Russo-Ukrainian war. He was killed in action on 20 October 2026, at the age of 46.
