= Malaysia at the UCI Track Cycling World Championships =

- IOC code: MAS
- National federation: Malaysian National Cycling Federation
- Medals: Gold 1 Silver 2 Bronze 5 Total 8

This page is an overview of Malaysia at the UCI Track Cycling World Championships.

== List of medalists ==
This is the list of Malaysian medals won at the UCI Track World Championships. This list does not include the amateur disciplines and defunct disciplines.

Medal	Championship	Name	Event
Gold	2017 Hong Kong	Azizulhasni Awang	Men's keirin
Silver	2009 Pruszków	Azizulhasni Awang	Men's sprint
Silver	2010 Ballerup	Azizulhasni Awang	Men's keirin
Bronze	2009 Pruszków	Mohd Rizal Tisin	Men's 1 km time trial
Bronze	2015 Yvelines	Azizulhasni Awang	Men's keirin
Bronze	2016 London	Azizulhasni Awang	Men's keirin
Bronze	2020 Berlin	Azizulhasni Awang	Men's keirin
Bronze	2020 Berlin	Azizulhasni Awang	Men's sprint

== Medal table ==
=== Medals by discipline ===
updated after the 2020 UCI Track Cycling World Championships

Event	Gold	Silver	Bronze	Total
Men's keirin	1	1	3	5
Men's sprint	0	1	1	2
Men's 1 km time trial	0	0	1	1
Total	1	2	5	8

=== Medals by championships ===
updated after the 2020 UCI Track Cycling World Championships

Event	Gold	Silver	Bronze	Total
2009 Pruszków	0	1	1	2
2010 Ballerup	0	1	0	1
2015 Yvelines	0	0	1	1
2016 London	0	0	1	1
2017 Hong Kong	1	0	0	1
2020 Berlin	0	0	2	2
Total	1	2	5	8

== 2005 ==
Malaysia competed at the 2005 UCI Track Cycling World Championships in Los Angeles, United States from 24 to 27 March. The event consisted of 15 disciplines for men and women. Malaysia sent a team of 1 man and 2 women.

Individual pursuit

Cyclist	Event	Qualification		Final	
Cyclist	Event	Time Speed (km/h)	Rank	Opponent Results	Rank
Uracca Leow	Women's individual pursuit	4:10.476; 43.117	17	did not advance	17

Keirin

Cyclist	Event	1st Round	Repechage	2nd Round	Final
Cyclist	Event	Rank	Rank	Rank	Rank
Josiah Ng	Men's keirin	3 R	2	did not advance	

Scratch

Cyclist	Event	Final
Cyclist	Event	Rank
Noor Azian Alias	Women's scratch	did not finish

== 2006 ==
Malaysia competed at the 2006 UCI Track Cycling World Championships in Bordeaux, France from 13 to 16 April. The event consisted of 15 disciplines for men and women. Malaysia sent 1 man.

Sprint

Cyclist	Event	Qualification		1/16 final	1/8 final	Repechage	Quarterfinals	Semifinals	Final	
Cyclist	Event	Time Speed (km/h)	Rank	Opposition Time Speed (km/h)	Opposition Time Speed (km/h)	Opposition Time Speed (km/h)	Opposition Time	Opposition Time	Opposition Time	Rank
Josiah Ng	Men's sprint	10.666; 67.504	33	did not advance						33

Keirin

Cyclist	Event	1st Round	Repechage	2nd Round	Final
Cyclist	Event	Rank	Rank	Rank	Rank
Josiah Ng	Men's keirin	7 R	5	did not advance	

== 2007 ==
Malaysia competed at the 2007 UCI Track Cycling World Championships in Palma de Mallorca, Spain from 29 March to 1 April. The event consisted of 17 disciplines for men and women. Malaysia sent a team of 3 men.

Sprint

Cyclist	Event	Qualification		1/16 final	1/8 final	Repechage	Quarterfinals	Semifinals	Final	
Cyclist	Event	Time Speed (km/h)	Rank	Opposition Time Speed (km/h)	Opposition Time Speed (km/h)	Opposition Time Speed (km/h)	Opposition Time	Opposition Time	Opposition Time	Rank
Azizulhasni Awang	Men's sprint	10.732; 67.089	32	did not advance						33
Mohd Rizal Tisin	Men's sprint	10.751; 66.970	33	did not advance						33

Time trial

Cyclist	Event	Final	
Cyclist	Event	Time Speed (km/h)	Rank
Azizulhasni Awang	Men's 1 km time trial	1:05.773; 54.733	19
Mohd Rizal Tisin	Men's 1 km time trial	1:05.836; 54.681	20

Team sprint

Cyclist	Event	Qualification		Final	
Cyclist	Event	Time Speed (km/h)	Rank	Opponent Results	Rank
Azizulhasni Awang; Josiah Ng; Mohd Rizal Tisin	Men's team sprint	47.268; 57.121	14	did not advance	

Keirin

Cyclist	Event	1st Round	Repechage	2nd Round	Final
Cyclist	Event	Rank	Rank	Rank	Rank
Josiah Ng	Men's keirin	DNF R	DNS	did not advance	
Mohd Rizal Tisin	Men's keirin	8 R	4	did not advance	

== 2008 ==
Malaysia competed at the 2008 UCI Track Cycling World Championships in Manchester, Great Britain from 26 to 30 March. The event consisted of 18 disciplines for men and women. Malaysia sent a team of 5 men.

Sprint

Cyclist	Event	Qualification		1/16 final	1/8 final	Repechage	Quarterfinals	Semifinals	Final	
Cyclist	Event	Time Speed (km/h)	Rank	Opposition Time Speed (km/h)	Opposition Time Speed (km/h)	Opposition Time Speed (km/h)	Opposition Time	Opposition Time	Opposition Time	Rank
Azizulhasni Awang	Men's sprint	10.160; 70.866	11 Q	Vynokurov (UKR); L	did not advance					13
Josiah Ng	Men's sprint	10.352; 69.551	25	did not advance						25

Time trial

Cyclist	Event	Final	
Cyclist	Event	Time Speed (km/h)	Rank
Mohd Rizal Tisin	Men's 1 km time trial	1:02.409; 57.683	5

Team sprint

Cyclist	Event	Qualification		Final	
Cyclist	Event	Time Speed (km/h)	Rank	Opponent Results	Rank
Azizulhasni Awang; Josiah Ng; Mohd Edrus Yunus	Men's team sprint	45.708; 59.070	15	did not advance	

Keirin

Cyclist	Event	1st Round	Repechage	2nd Round	Final
Cyclist	Event	Rank	Rank	Rank	Rank
Azizulhasni Awang	Men's keirin	1 Q	Bye	6	12
Josiah Ng	Men's keirin	4 R	3	did not advance	
Mohd Rizal Tisin	Men's keirin	6 R	5	did not advance	

Scratch

Cyclist	Event	Final
Cyclist	Event	Rank
Harrif Saleh	Men's scratch	did not finish

== 2009 ==
Malaysia competed at the 2009 UCI Track Cycling World Championships in Pruszków, Poland from 25 to 29 March. The event consisted of 19 disciplines for men and women. Malaysia sent a team of 3 men.

Sprint

Cyclist	Event	Qualification		1/16 final	1/8 final	Repechage	Quarterfinals	Semifinals	Final	
Cyclist	Event	Time Speed (km/h)	Rank	Opposition Time Speed (km/h)	Opposition Time Speed (km/h)	Opposition Time Speed (km/h)	Opposition Time	Opposition Time	Opposition Time	Rank
Azizulhasni Awang	Men's sprint	10.210; 70.519	12 Q	Tisin (MAS); W	Baugé (FRA); W	Bye	Edgar (GBR); W	Perkins (AUS); W	Baugé (FRA); L	2nd place, silver medalist(s)
Josiah Ng	Men's sprint	10.439; 68.972	19 Q	Crampton (GBR); L	did not advance					19
Mohd Rizal Tisin	Men's sprint	10.232; 70.367	13 Q	Awang (MAS); L	did not advance					13

Time trial

Cyclist	Event	Final	
Cyclist	Event	Time Speed (km/h)	Rank
Mohd Rizal Tisin	Men's 1 km time trial	1:01.658; 58.386	3rd place, bronze medalist(s)

Team sprint

Cyclist	Event	Qualification		Final	
Cyclist	Event	Time Speed (km/h)	Rank	Opponent Results	Rank
Azizulhasni Awang; Josiah Ng; Mohd Rizal Tisin	Men's team sprint	44.996; 60.005	6	did not advance	

Keirin

Cyclist	Event	1st Round	Repechage	2nd Round	Final
Cyclist	Event	Rank	Rank	Rank	Rank
Azizulhasni Awang	Men's keirin	2 Q	Bye	4	11
Josiah Ng	Men's keirin	5 R	1 Q	4	10

== 2010 ==
Malaysia competed at the 2010 UCI Track Cycling World Championships in Ballerup, Denmark from 24 to 28 March. The event consisted of 19 disciplines for men and women. Malaysia sent a team of 2 men.

Sprint

Cyclist	Event	Qualification		1/16 final	1/8 final	Repechage	Quarterfinals	Semifinals	Final	
Cyclist	Event	Time Speed (km/h)	Rank	Opposition Time Speed (km/h)	Opposition Time Speed (km/h)	Opposition Time Speed (km/h)	Opposition Time	Opposition Time	Opposition Time	Rank
Azizulhasni Awang	Men's sprint	10.264; 70.148	20 Q	D'Almeida (FRA); W	Kenny (GBR); L	Hoy (GBR); Bergemann (GER); L	did not advance			12
Josiah Ng	Men's sprint	10.278; 70.052	21 Q	Sireau (FRA); L	did not advance					21

Keirin

Cyclist	Event	1st Round	Repechage	2nd Round	Final
Cyclist	Event	Rank	Rank	Rank	Rank
Azizulhasni Awang	Men's keirin	1 Q	Bye	2 Q	2nd place, silver medalist(s)
Josiah Ng	Men's keirin	DSQ	did not advance		

== 2011 ==
Malaysia competed at the 2011 UCI Track Cycling World Championships in Apeldoorn, Netherlands from 23 to 27 March. The event consisted of 19 disciplines for men and women. Malaysia sent a team of 4 men and 1 woman.

Sprint

Cyclist	Event	Qualification		1/16 final	1/8 final	Repechage	Quarterfinals	Semifinals	Final	
Cyclist	Event	Time Speed (km/h)	Rank	Opposition Time Speed (km/h)	Opposition Time Speed (km/h)	Opposition Time Speed (km/h)	Opposition Time	Opposition Time	Opposition Time	Rank
Arfy Qhairant	Men's sprint	11.062; 65.087	48	did not advance						48
Mohd Edrus Yunus	Men's sprint	10.942; 65.801	47	did not advance						47
Fatehah Mustapa	Women's sprint	12.125; 59.381	25	did not advance						25

Time trial

Cyclist	Event	Final	
Cyclist	Event	Time Speed (km/h)	Rank
Arfy Qhairant	Men's 1 km time trial	1:08.450; 52.593	20
Mohd Rizal Tisin	Men's 1 km time trial	1:03.651; 56.558	11
Fatehah Mustapa	Women's 500 m time trial	36.458; 49.371	10

Team sprint

Cyclist	Event	Qualification		Final	
Cyclist	Event	Time Speed (km/h)	Rank	Opponent Results	Rank
Josiah Ng; Mohd Edrus Yunus; Mohd Rizal Tisin	Men's team sprint	46.470; 58.102	15	did not advance	

Keirin

Cyclist	Event	1st Round	Repechage	2nd Round	Final
Cyclist	Event	Rank	Rank	Rank	Rank
Josiah Ng	Men's keirin	4 R	2	did not advance	
Mohd Rizal Tisin	Men's keirin	5 R	5	did not advance	
Fatehah Mustapa	Women's keirin	2 Q	Bye	3 Q	5

Scratch

Cyclist	Event	Final
Cyclist	Event	Rank
Arfy Qhairant	Men's scratch	did not finish
Fatehah Mustapa	Women's scratch	14

== 2012 ==
Malaysia competed at the 2012 UCI Track Cycling World Championships in Melbourne, Australia from 4 to 8 April. The event consisted of 19 disciplines for men and women. Malaysia sent a team of 5 men and 1 woman.

Sprint

Cyclist	Event	Qualification		1/16 final	1/8 final	Repechage	Quarterfinals	Semifinals	Final	
Cyclist	Event	Time Speed (km/h)	Rank	Opposition Time Speed (km/h)	Opposition Time Speed (km/h)	Opposition Time Speed (km/h)	Opposition Time	Opposition Time	Opposition Time	Rank
Azizulhasni Awang	Men's sprint	10.193; 70.636	27	did not advance						27
Mohd Edrus Yunus	Men's sprint	10.439; 68.972	45	did not advance						45
Fatehah Mustapa	Women's sprint	11.487; 62.679	25	did not advance						25

Time trial

Cyclist	Event	Final	
Cyclist	Event	Time Speed (km/h)	Rank
Mohd Edrus Yunus	Men's 1 km time trial	1:05.280; 55.147	23

Team sprint

Cyclist	Event	Qualification		Final	
Cyclist	Event	Time Speed (km/h)	Rank	Opponent Results	Rank
Josiah Ng; Mohd Edrus Yunus; Mohd Fattah Amri	Men's team sprint	45.529; 59.302	12	did not advance	

Keirin

Cyclist	Event	1st Round	Repechage	2nd Round	Final
Cyclist	Event	Rank	Rank	Rank	Rank
Azizulhasni Awang	Men's keirin	1 Q	Bye	5	9
Josiah Ng	Men's keirin	2 R	3	did not advance	
Mohd Edrus Yunus	Men's keirin	5 R	5	did not advance	
Fatehah Mustapa	Women's keirin	2 Q	Bye	4	11

Scratch

Cyclist	Event	Final
Cyclist	Event	Rank
Harrif Saleh	Men's scratch	17

Points race

Cyclist	Event	Final			
Cyclist	Event	Points	Laps	Finish order	Rank
Harrif Saleh	Men's points race	2	-1	DNF	

== 2013 ==
Malaysia competed at the 2013 UCI Track Cycling World Championships in Minsk, Belarus from 20 to 24 February. The event consisted of 19 disciplines for men and women. Malaysia sent 1 man.

Keirin

Cyclist	Event	1st Round	Repechage	2nd Round	Final
Cyclist	Event	Rank	Rank	Rank	Rank
Josiah Ng	Men's keirin	2 Q	Bye	5	11

== 2014 ==
Malaysia competed at the 2014 UCI Track Cycling World Championships in Cali, Colombia from 26 February to 2 March. The event consisted of 19 disciplines for men and women. Malaysia sent a team of 1 man and 2 women.

Sprint

Cyclist	Event	Qualification		1/16 final	1/8 final	Repechage	Quarterfinals	Semifinals	Final	
Cyclist	Event	Time Speed (km/h)	Rank	Opposition Time Speed (km/h)	Opposition Time Speed (km/h)	Opposition Time Speed (km/h)	Opposition Time	Opposition Time	Opposition Time	Rank
Azizulhasni Awang	Men's sprint	10.066; 71.527	19 Q	Perkins (AUS); L	did not advance					19
Fatehah Mustapa	Women's sprint	11.221; 64.165	17 Q	Lin (CHN); L	did not advance					17

Keirin

Cyclist	Event	1st Round	Repechage	2nd Round	Final
Cyclist	Event	Rank	Rank	Rank	Rank
Azizulhasni Awang	Men's keirin	5 R	2 Q	DSQ	did not advance
Fatehah Mustapa	Women's keirin	1 Q	Bye	4	8

Scratch

Cyclist	Event	Final
Cyclist	Event	Rank
Jupha Somnet	Women's scratch	did not finish

== 2015 ==
Malaysia competed at the 2015 UCI Track Cycling World Championships in Yvelines, France from 18 to 22 February. The event consisted of 19 disciplines for men and women. Malaysia sent a team of 2 men and 1 woman.

Sprint

Cyclist	Event	Qualification		1/16 final	1/8 final	Repechage	Quarterfinals	Semifinals	Final	
Cyclist	Event	Time Speed (km/h)	Rank	Opposition Time Speed (km/h)	Opposition Time Speed (km/h)	Opposition Time Speed (km/h)	Opposition Time	Opposition Time	Opposition Time	Rank
Fatehah Mustapa	Women's sprint	11.108; 64.818	17 Q	Voynova (RUS); L	did not advance					17

Keirin

Cyclist	Event	1st Round	Repechage	2nd Round	Final
Cyclist	Event	Rank	Rank	Rank	Rank
Azizulhasni Awang	Men's keirin	1 Q	Bye	3 Q	3rd place, bronze medalist(s)
Josiah Ng	Men's keirin	6 R	4	did not advance	
Fatehah Mustapa	Women's keirin	3 R	1 Q	5	12

== 2016 ==
Malaysia competed at the 2016 UCI Track Cycling World Championships in London, Great Britain from 2 to 6 March. The event consisted of 19 disciplines for men and women. Malaysia sent a team of 1 man and 1 woman.

Sprint

Cyclist	Event	Qualification		1/16 final	1/8 final	Repechage	Quarterfinals	Semifinals	Final	
Cyclist	Event	Time Speed (km/h)	Rank	Opposition Time Speed (km/h)	Opposition Time Speed (km/h)	Opposition Time Speed (km/h)	Opposition Time	Opposition Time	Opposition Time	Rank
Azizulhasni Awang	Men's sprint	10.084; 71.400	28	did not advance						28
Fatehah Mustapa	Women's sprint	11.334; 63.525	25	did not advance						25

Keirin

Cyclist	Event	1st Round	Repechage	2nd Round	Final
Cyclist	Event	Rank	Rank	Rank	Rank
Azizulhasni Awang	Men's keirin	3 R	1 Q	2 Q	3rd place, bronze medalist(s)
Fatehah Mustapa	Women's keirin	6 R	2	did not advance	

== 2017 ==
Malaysia competed at the 2017 UCI Track Cycling World Championships in Hong Kong from 12 to 16 April. The event consisted of 20 disciplines for men and women. Malaysia sent a team of 2 men.

Sprint

Cyclist	Event	Qualification		1/16 final	1/8 final	Quarterfinals	Semifinals	Final	
Cyclist	Event	Time Speed (km/h)	Rank	Opposition Time Speed (km/h)	Opposition Time Speed (km/h)	Opposition Time	Opposition Time	Opposition Time	Rank
Azizulhasni Awang	Men's sprint	10.057; 71.591	23 Q	Barrette (CAN); L	did not advance				23

Keirin

Cyclist	Event	1st Round	Repechage	2nd Round	Final
Cyclist	Event	Rank	Rank	Rank	Rank
Azizulhasni Awang	Men's keirin	2 Q	1 Q	3 Q	1st place, gold medalist(s)
Muhammad Shah Firdaus Sahrom	Men's keirin	3 R	2	did not advance	

== 2018 ==
Malaysia competed at the 2018 UCI Track Cycling World Championships in Apeldoorn, Netherlands from 28 February to 4 March. The event consisted of 20 disciplines for men and women. Malaysia sent a team of 2 men.

Sprint

Cyclist	Event	Qualification		1/16 final	1/8 final	Quarterfinals	Semifinals	Final	
Cyclist	Event	Time Speed (km/h)	Rank	Opposition Time Speed (km/h)	Opposition Time Speed (km/h)	Opposition Time	Opposition Time	Opposition Time	Rank
Azizulhasni Awang	Men's sprint	10.072; 71.485	28 Q	Carlin (GBR); L	did not advance				28
Muhammad Shah Firdaus Sahrom	Men's sprint	10.293; 69.950	34	did not advance					34

Keirin

Cyclist	Event	1st Round	Repechage	2nd Round	Final
Cyclist	Event	Rank	Rank	Rank	Rank
Azizulhasni Awang	Men's keirin	3 R	2	did not advance	
Muhammad Shah Firdaus Sahrom	Men's keirin	2 R	3	did not advance	

== 2019 ==
Malaysia competed at the 2019 UCI Track Cycling World Championships in Pruszków, Poland from 27 February to 3 March. The event consisted of 20 disciplines for men and women. Malaysia sent a team of 3 men.

Sprint

Cyclist	Event	Qualification		1/16 final	1/8 final	Quarterfinals	Semifinals	Final	
Cyclist	Event	Time Speed (km/h)	Rank	Opposition Time Speed (km/h)	Opposition Time Speed (km/h)	Opposition Time	Opposition Time	Opposition Time	Rank
Azizulhasni Awang	Men's sprint	10.022; 71.842	30	did not advance					30
Muhammad Fadhil Mohd Zonis	Men's sprint	10.242; 70.299	34	did not advance					34
Muhammad Shah Firdaus Sahrom	Men's sprint	10.090; 71.358	31	did not advance					31

Team sprint

Cyclist	Event	Qualification		Final	
Cyclist	Event	Time Speed (km/h)	Rank	Opponent Results	Rank
Azizulhasni Awang; Muhammad Fadhil Mohd Zonis; Muhammad Shah Firdaus Sahrom	Men's team sprint	45.099; 59.868	15	did not advance	

Keirin

Cyclist	Event	1st Round	Repechage	Quarterfinals	Semifinals	Final
Cyclist	Event	Rank	Rank	Rank	Rank	Rank
Azizulhasni Awang	Men's keirin	3 R	2 Q	3 Q	4	7
Muhammad Shah Firdaus Sahrom	Men's keirin	5 R	3	did not advance		

== 2020 ==
Malaysia competed at the 2020 UCI Track Cycling World Championships in Berlin, Germany from 26 February to 1 March. The event consisted of 20 disciplines for men and women. Malaysia sent a team of 3 men.

Sprint

Cyclist	Event	Qualification		1/16 final	1/8 final	Quarterfinals	Semifinals	Final	
Cyclist	Event	Time Speed (km/h)	Rank	Opposition Time Speed (km/h)	Opposition Time Speed (km/h)	Opposition Time	Opposition Time	Opposition Time	Rank
Azizulhasni Awang	Men's sprint	9.548; 75.408	5 Q	Lendel (LTU); W	Tjon En Fa (SUR); W	Fukaya (JPN); W	Lavreysen (GER); L	Race for bronze Rudyk (POL); W	3rd place, bronze medalist(s)
Muhammad Fadhil Mohd Zonis	Men's sprint	9.945; 72.398	33	did not advance					33
Muhammad Shah Firdaus Sahrom	Men's sprint	9.609; 74.930	14 Q	Carlin (GBR); W	Rudyk (POL); L	did not advance			13

Time trial

Cyclist	Event	Qualification		Final	
Cyclist	Event	Time Speed (km/h)	Rank	Time Speed (km/h)	Rank
Muhammad Fadhil Mohd Zonis	Men's 1 km time trial	1:00.305; 59.697	7 Q	1:00.895; 59.118	8

Keirin

Cyclist	Event	1st Round	Repechage	Quarterfinals	Semifinals	Final
Cyclist	Event	Rank	Rank	Rank	Rank	Rank
Azizulhasni Awang	Men's keirin	2 Q	Bye	2 Q	1 Q	3rd place, bronze medalist(s)
