= Cycling at the 2018 Asian Games – Men's sprint =

Men's sprint at the 2018 Asian Games
- Venue: Jakarta International Velodrome
- Date: 29–30 August 2018
- Competitors: 19 from 10 nations

Medalists
| gold medal | Azizulhasni Awang | Malaysia |
| silver medal | Tomohiro Fukaya | Japan |
| bronze medal | Im Chae-bin | South Korea |

The men's sprint competition at the 2018 Asian Games was held on 29 and 30 August at the Jakarta International Velodrome.

== Schedule ==
All times are Western Indonesia Time (UTC+07:00)

| Date | Time | Event |
|---|---|---|
| Wednesday, 29 August 2018 | 09:20 | Qualifying |
| Wednesday, 29 August 2018 | 10:51 | 1/16 finals |
| Wednesday, 29 August 2018 | 16:00 | 1/8 finals |
| Wednesday, 29 August 2018 | 16:44 | Quarterfinals |
| Thursday, 30 August 2018 | 09:50 | Semifinals |
| Thursday, 30 August 2018 | 16:00 | Finals |

== Records ==
Prior to this competition, the existing world, Asian and Games records were as follows.

| World Record | François Pervis (FRA) | 9.347 | Aguascalientes, Mexico | 6 December 2013 |
| Asian Record | Seiichiro Nakagawa (JPN) | 9.702 | Aguascalientes, Mexico | 19 January 2013 |
| Games Record | Seiichiro Nakagawa (JPN) | 9.942 | Incheon, South Korea | 22 September 2014 |

== Results ==
=== Qualifying ===
| Rank | Athlete | Time | Notes |
|---|---|---|---|
| 1 | Im Chae-bin (KOR) | 9.865 | GR |
| 2 | Xu Chao (CHN) | 9.892 | |
| 3 | Zhou Yu (CHN) | 9.941 | |
| 4 | Yuta Wakimoto (JPN) | 9.963 | |
| 5 | Azizulhasni Awang (MAS) | 10.046 | |
| 6 | Tomohiro Fukaya (JPN) | 10.052 | |
| 7 | Shah Firdaus Sahrom (MAS) | 10.053 | |
| 8 | Jai Angsuthasawit (THA) | 10.178 | |
| 9 | Pavel Vorzhev (KAZ) | 10.180 | |
| 10 | Law Tsz Chun (HKG) | 10.248 | |
| 11 | Ehsan Khademi (IRI) | 10.251 | |
| 12 | Seok Hye-yun (KOR) | 10.297 | |
| 13 | Mohammad Daneshvar (IRI) | 10.306 | |
| 14 | Sergey Ponomaryov (KAZ) | 10.335 | |
| 15 | Puguh Admadi (INA) | 10.338 | |
| 16 | Esow Alben (IND) | 10.438 | |
| 17 | Pongthep Tapimay (THA) | 10.490 | |
| 18 | Ranjit Singh (IND) | 10.639 | |
| 19 | Ahmad Raditya (INA) | 10.977 | |

=== 1/16 finals ===
==== Heat 1 ====
| Rank | Athlete | Gap |
|---|---|---|
| 1 | Sergey Ponomaryov (KAZ) | |
| 2 | Ahmad Raditya (INA) | +0.794 |

==== Heat 2 ====
| Rank | Athlete | Gap |
|---|---|---|
| 1 | Puguh Admadi (INA) | |
| 2 | Ranjit Singh (IND) | +0.008 |

==== Heat 3 ====
| Rank | Athlete | Gap |
|---|---|---|
| 1 | Esow Alben (IND) | |
| 2 | Pongthep Tapimay (THA) | +0.144 |

=== 1/8 finals ===
==== Heat 1 ====
| Rank | Athlete | Gap |
|---|---|---|
| 1 | Im Chae-bin (KOR) | |
| 2 | Esow Alben (IND) | +0.434 |

==== Heat 2 ====
| Rank | Athlete | Gap |
|---|---|---|
| 1 | Xu Chao (CHN) | |
| 2 | Puguh Admadi (INA) | +0.081 |

==== Heat 3 ====
| Rank | Athlete | Gap |
|---|---|---|
| 1 | Zhou Yu (CHN) | |
| 2 | Sergey Ponomaryov (KAZ) | +0.043 |

==== Heat 4 ====
| Rank | Athlete | Gap |
|---|---|---|
| 1 | Yuta Wakimoto (JPN) | |
| 2 | Mohammad Daneshvar (IRI) | +0.272 |

==== Heat 5 ====
| Rank | Athlete | Gap |
|---|---|---|
| 1 | Azizulhasni Awang (MAS) | |
| 2 | Seok Hye-yun (KOR) | +0.458 |

==== Heat 6 ====
| Rank | Athlete | Gap |
|---|---|---|
| 1 | Tomohiro Fukaya (JPN) | |
| 2 | Ehsan Khademi (IRI) | +0.225 |

==== Heat 7 ====
| Rank | Athlete | Gap |
|---|---|---|
| 1 | Shah Firdaus Sahrom (MAS) | |
| 2 | Law Tsz Chun (HKG) | +0.362 |

==== Heat 8 ====
| Rank | Athlete | Gap |
|---|---|---|
| 1 | Pavel Vorzhev (KAZ) | |
| 2 | Jai Angsuthasawit (THA) | +0.015 |

=== Quarterfinals ===
==== Heat 1 ====
| Rank | Athlete | 1st race | 2nd race | Decider |
|---|---|---|---|---|
| 1 | Im Chae-bin (KOR) | | | |
| 2 | Pavel Vorzhev (KAZ) | +0.160 | +0.084 | |

==== Heat 2 ====
| Rank | Athlete | 1st race | 2nd race | Decider |
|---|---|---|---|---|
| 1 | Shah Firdaus Sahrom (MAS) | +0.009 | | |
| 2 | Xu Chao (CHN) | | +0.004 | +0.085 |

==== Heat 3 ====
| Rank | Athlete | 1st race | 2nd race | Decider |
|---|---|---|---|---|
| 1 | Tomohiro Fukaya (JPN) | | | |
| 2 | Zhou Yu (CHN) | +0.039 | +0.061 | |

==== Heat 4 ====
| Rank | Athlete | 1st race | 2nd race | Decider |
|---|---|---|---|---|
| 1 | Azizulhasni Awang (MAS) | | | |
| 2 | Yuta Wakimoto (JPN) | +0.018 | +0.358 | |

=== Semifinals ===
==== Heat 1 ====
| Rank | Athlete | 1st race | 2nd race | Decider |
|---|---|---|---|---|
| 1 | Azizulhasni Awang (MAS) | | | |
| 2 | Im Chae-bin (KOR) | +0.041 | +0.086 | |

==== Heat 2 ====
| Rank | Athlete | 1st race | 2nd race | Decider |
|---|---|---|---|---|
| 1 | Tomohiro Fukaya (JPN) | | | |
| 2 | Shah Firdaus Sahrom (MAS) | +0.029 | +0.022 | |

=== Finals ===
==== Bronze ====
| Rank | Athlete | 1st race | 2nd race | Decider |
|---|---|---|---|---|
| 1 | Im Chae-bin (KOR) | | +0.127 | |
| 2 | Shah Firdaus Sahrom (MAS) | +0.291 | | +0.017 |

==== Gold ====
| Rank | Athlete | 1st race | 2nd race | Decider |
|---|---|---|---|---|
| 1 | Azizulhasni Awang (MAS) | | | |
| 2 | Tomohiro Fukaya (JPN) | +0.186 | +0.090 | |

== Final standing ==
| Rank | Athlete |
|---|---|
| 1st place, gold medalist(s) | Azizulhasni Awang (MAS) |
| 2nd place, silver medalist(s) | Tomohiro Fukaya (JPN) |
| 3rd place, bronze medalist(s) | Im Chae-bin (KOR) |
| 4 | Shah Firdaus Sahrom (MAS) |
| 5 | Xu Chao (CHN) |
| 6 | Zhou Yu (CHN) |
| 7 | Yuta Wakimoto (JPN) |
| 8 | Pavel Vorzhev (KAZ) |
| 9 | Jai Angsuthasawit (THA) |
| 10 | Law Tsz Chun (HKG) |
| 11 | Ehsan Khademi (IRI) |
| 12 | Seok Hye-yun (KOR) |
| 13 | Mohammad Daneshvar (IRI) |
| 14 | Sergey Ponomaryov (KAZ) |
| 15 | Puguh Admadi (INA) |
| 16 | Esow Alben (IND) |
| 17 | Pongthep Tapimay (THA) |
| 18 | Ranjit Singh (IND) |
| 19 | Ahmad Raditya (INA) |
