= Cycling at the 2020 Summer Olympics – Men's keirin =

Olympic cycling event

Men's Keirin at the Games of the XXXII Olympiad
- Olympic track cycling
- Venues: Izu Velodrome
- Dates: 7–8 August 2021
- Competitors: 30 from 18 nations

Medalists
1st place, gold medalist(s)		Jason Kenny	Great Britain
2nd place, silver medalist(s)		Azizulhasni Awang	Malaysia
3rd place, bronze medalist(s)		Harrie Lavreysen	Netherlands

The men's Keirin event at the 2020 Summer Olympics took place on 7 and 8 August 2021 at the Izu Velodrome. 30 cyclists from 18 nations competed.

The medals were presented by Yasuhiro Yamashita, IOC member, Olympian, 1 Gold Medal, Japan; and the medalists' bouquets were presented by Dato' Amarjit Singh Gill, UCI Management Committee Member, Malaysia.

== Background ==
This was the 6th appearance of the event, which has been held at every Summer Olympics since its introduction in 2000.

The reigning Olympic champion was Jason Kenny of Great Britain; Great Britain had won three consecutive titles in the event (Chris Hoy was the winner in 2008 and 2012). The reigning (2020) World Champion was Harrie Lavreysen of the Netherlands.

Russia, Germany, China, Great Britain, Australia, and the Netherlands were traditionally strong track cycling nations. A preview at Olympics.com also identified Azizulhasni Awang of Malaysia, the 2016 Olympic bronze medalist and 2017 World Champion, as a significant contender.

== Qualification ==
A National Olympic Committee (NOC) could enter up to 2 qualified cyclists in the men's Keirin. Quota places are allocated to the NOC, which selects the cyclists. Qualification is entirely through the 2018–20 UCI nation rankings. The eight nations that qualify for the team sprint event may enter two cyclists each in the Keirin (as well as the individual sprint). The nations that qualify a cyclist through the individual sprint rankings may also enter that cyclist in the Keirin. Finally, seven places are allocated through the Keirin rankings. Because qualification was complete by the end of the 2020 UCI Track Cycling World Championships on 1 March 2020 (the last event that contributed to the 2018–20 rankings), qualification was unaffected by the COVID-19 pandemic.

== Competition format ==
Keirin races involve up to 7 cyclists each (though the 2020 format has no races with more than 6). The cyclists follow a pace motorcycle for 3 laps (750 m); the motorcycle then pulls away and the cyclists race for another 3 laps. These distances are changed from the 2016 Games, shortening the paced section from 5.5 laps and lengthening the unpaced sprint from 2.5 laps. The motorcycle starts at 30 km/h and increases speed to 50 km/h before it pulls off.

The tournament consists of four main rounds (up from three in 2016) and a repechage:

- First round: Five heats of 6 cyclists each. The top 2 cyclists in each heat (10 total) advance to the second round; all others (20 cyclists) go to the repechage.
- Repechage: Four heats of 5 cyclists each. The top 2 cyclists in each heat (8 total) rejoin the first-round winners in the second round. The other 12 cyclists are eliminated.
- Second round: Three heats of 6 cyclists each. The top 4 cyclists in each heat (12 total) advance to the semifinals. The remaining 6 cyclists are eliminated.
- Semifinals: Two heats of 6 cyclists each. The top 3 cyclists in each semifinal (6 total) advance to Final A; the bottom 3 cyclists from each semifinal go to Final B, out of medal contention.
- Finals: Two finals. Final A consists of the top 6 cyclists, awarding medals and 4th through 6th place. Final B ranks the next 6 cyclists from 7th to 12th.

== Schedule ==
All times are Japan Standard Time (UTC+9)

Date	Time	Round
7 August 2021	15:48; 16:19	First round Repechages
8 August 2021	10:24; 11:09; 11:51	Quarterfinals; Semifinals; Finals

== Results ==
=== First round ===
Heat 1

Rank	Cyclist	Nation	Gap	Notes
1	Rayan Helal	France		QF
2	Maximilian Levy	Germany	+0.010	QF
3	Kwesi Browne	Trinidad and Tobago	+0.248	R
4	Jason Kenny	Great Britain	+0.462	R
5	Sam Webster	New Zealand	+0.546	R
6	Ivan Gladyshev	ROC	+3.173	R

Heat 2

Rank	Cyclist	Nation	Gap	Notes
1	Jack Carlin	Great Britain		QF
2	Matthew Richardson	Australia	+0.070	QF
3	Matthijs Büchli	Netherlands	REL	R
	Hugo Barrette	Canada	DNF	R
	Sergey Ponomaryov	Kazakhstan	DNF	R
	Shah Firdaus Sahrom	Malaysia	DNF	R

Heat 3

Rank	Cyclist	Nation	Gap	Notes
1	Azizulhasni Awang	Malaysia		QF
2	Nicholas Paul	Trinidad and Tobago	+0.075	QF
3	Patryk Rajkowski	Poland	+0.104	R
4	Stefan Bötticher	Germany	+0.115	R
5	Jean Spies	South Africa	+0.739	R
6	Sébastien Vigier	France	+0.884	R

Heat 4

Rank	Cyclist	Nation	Gap	Notes
1	Yudai Nitta	Japan		QF
2	Denis Dmitriev	ROC	+0.004	QF
3	Matthew Glaetzer	Australia	+0.093	R
4	Xu Chao	China	+0.240	R
5	Harrie Lavreysen	Netherlands	+0.256	R
6	Mateusz Rudyk	Poland	+0.974	R

Heat 5

Rank	Cyclist	Nation	Gap	Notes
1	Yuta Wakimoto	Japan		QF
2	Callum Saunders	New Zealand	+0.089	QF
3	Kevin Quintero	Colombia	+0.096	R
4	Tomáš Bábek	Czech Republic	+0.228	R
5	Nick Wammes	Canada	+0.292	R
6	Jair Tjon En Fa	Suriname	+0.396	R

=== Repechages ===
Heat 1

Rank	Cyclist	Nation	Gap	Notes
1	Kwesi Browne	Trinidad and Tobago		QF
2	Shah Firdaus Sahrom	Malaysia	+0.010	QF
3	Sébastien Vigier	France	+0.037	
4	Tomáš Bábek	Czech Republic	+0.638	
5	Xu Chao	China	+0.979	

Heat 2

Rank	Cyclist	Nation	Gap	Notes
1	Jason Kenny	Great Britain		QF
2	Stefan Bötticher	Germany	+0.363	QF
3	Matthijs Büchli	Netherlands	+0.441	
4	Mateusz Rudyk	Poland	+0.480	
5	Nick Wammes	Canada	+0.564	

Heat 3

Rank	Cyclist	Nation	Gap	Notes
1	Harrie Lavreysen	Netherlands		QF
2	Jair Tjon En Fa	Suriname	+0.578	QF
3	Sam Webster	New Zealand	+0.580	
4	Hugo Barrette	Canada	+0.738	
5	Patryk Rajkowski	Poland	+1.616	

Heat 4

Rank	Cyclist	Nation	Gap	Notes
1	Matthew Glaetzer	Australia		QF
2	Kevin Quintero	Colombia	+0.069	QF
3	Sergey Ponomaryov	Kazakhstan	+0.124	
4	Ivan Gladyshev	ROC	+0.675	
5	Jean Spies	South Africa	+0.760	

=== Quarterfinals ===
Heat 1

Rank	Cyclist	Nation	Gap	Notes
1	Kevin Quintero	Colombia		SF
2	Jason Kenny	Great Britain	+0.045	SF
3	Rayan Helal	France	+0.105	SF
4	Harrie Lavreysen	Netherlands	+0.122	SF
5	Matthew Richardson	Australia	+0.212	
6	Yudai Nitta	Japan	+0.331	

Heat 2

Rank	Cyclist	Nation	Gap	Notes
1	Nicholas Paul	Trinidad and Tobago		SF
2	Jack Carlin	Great Britain	+0.503	SF
3	Jair Tjon En Fa	Suriname	+0.602	SF
4	Maximilian Levy	Germany	+0.667	SF
5	Callum Saunders	New Zealand	+0.723	
6	Shah Firdaus Sahrom	Malaysia	+1.204	

Heat 3

Rank	Cyclist	Nation	Gap	Notes
1	Yuta Wakimoto	Japan		SF
2	Azizulhasni Awang	Malaysia	+0.039	SF
3	Kwesi Browne	Trinidad and Tobago	+0.098	SF
4	Matthew Glaetzer	Australia	+0.104	SF
5	Stefan Bötticher	Germany	+0.192	
6	Denis Dmitriev	ROC	+0.236	

=== Semifinals ===
Heat 1

Rank	Cyclist	Nation	Gap	Notes
1	Jason Kenny	Great Britain		FA
2	Matthew Glaetzer	Australia	+0.003	FA
3	Jair Tjon En Fa	Suriname	+0.089	FA
4	Jack Carlin	Great Britain	+0.240	FB
5	Kwesi Browne	Trinidad and Tobago	+0.357	FB
6	Kevin Quintero	Colombia	+0.397	FB

Heat 2

Rank	Cyclist	Nation	Gap	Notes
1	Azizulhasni Awang	Malaysia		FA
2	Maximilian Levy	Germany	+0.035	FA
3	Harrie Lavreysen	Netherlands	+0.073	FA
4	Rayan Helal	France	+0.497	FB
5	Yuta Wakimoto	Japan	+0.775	FB
	Nicholas Paul	Trinidad and Tobago	DSQ	

=== Finals ===
==== Final A ====
The Keirin final was won in unusual and dramatic style by the reigning champion, Jason Kenny of Great Britain in what would be his last race, riding in position one behind the derny. Taking the drag of the derny in what is often considered an unhelpful position for the final sprint, Kenny's superior experience and racecraft led him to take advantage of the nervous Matthew Glaetzer in second wheel.

Noting that Glaetzer was looking behind himself instinctively every time Kenny checked back on him in second wheel, Kenny eased himself a few bike lengths ahead of the Australian, throwing a final glance back at Glaetzer just as the derny was pulling off. As Glaetzer held the field up very marginally with his attention again diverted by Kenny to the riders behind him, Kenny launched a highly unusual and ferocious breakaway attack immediately as the derny left the track, putting almost half a lap into all his rivals before they were fully aware what had happened. Despite a frenzied chase led by Dutch sprint and team sprint gold medalist, reigning world champion and hot favourite Harrie Lavreysen, seeking to replicate the sprint 'triple crown' previously won by Kenny in 2016 and Chris Hoy in 2008, Kenny was able to hold off the field riding purely in time trial mode he'd been training in for the team sprint, using the banking to gain speed free from the normal contact with the bunch, and winning the event by the length of a straight. The gold medal made Kenny the most successful British Olympian, and the most successful Olympic cyclist, in history. It also made Kenny one of the elite number of Olympians to have successfully defended an Olympic gold medal in three different events (in Kenny's case, team sprint between 2008 and 2016, sprint between 2012 and 2016 and keirin between 2016 and 2020), the others being Michael Phelps, Ray Ewry, Larisa Latynina, Jenny Thompson and Sawao Kato.

Rank	Cyclist	Nation	Gap	Notes
1st place, gold medalist(s)	Jason Kenny	Great Britain		
2nd place, silver medalist(s)	Azizulhasni Awang	Malaysia	+0.763	
3rd place, bronze medalist(s)	Harrie Lavreysen	Netherlands	+0.773	
4	Jair Tjon En Fa	Suriname	+1.264	
5	Matthew Glaetzer	Australia	+1.344	
6	Maximilian Levy	Germany	+2.344	

==== Final B ====
Rank	Cyclist	Nation	Gap	Notes
7	Yuta Wakimoto	Japan		
8	Jack Carlin	Great Britain	+0.097	
9	Kwesi Browne	Trinidad and Tobago	+0.203	
10	Rayan Helal	France	+0.251	
11	Kevin Quintero	Colombia	+0.314	

== See also ==
- Cycling at the 2020 Summer Olympics – Women's keirin
- Keirin
