= Cycling at the 2018 Asian Games – Men's keirin =

Men's keirin at the 2018 Asian Games
- Venue: Jakarta International Velodrome
- Date: 31 August 2018
- Competitors: 19 from 10 nations

Medalists
gold medal	Jai Angsuthasawit	Thailand
silver medal	Yudai Nitta	Japan
bronze medal	Azizulhasni Awang	Malaysia

The men's keirin competition at the 2018 Asian Games was held on 31 August at the Jakarta International Velodrome.

== Schedule ==
All times are Western Indonesia Time (UTC+07:00)

Date	Time	Event
Friday, 31 August 2018	09:12	First round
Friday, 31 August 2018	10:20	First round repechage
Friday, 31 August 2018	13:50	Second round
Friday, 31 August 2018	15:14	Finals

== Results ==
Legend

- REL — Relegated

=== First round ===
==== Heat 1 ====
Rank	Athlete	Gap
1	Yuta Wakimoto (JPN)	
2	Im Chae-bin (KOR)	+0.049
3	Jai Angsuthasawit (THA)	+0.226
4	Ehsan Khademi (IRI)	+0.294
5	Puguh Admadi (INA)	+0.392
6	Sergey Ponomaryov (KAZ)	+0.444
7	Ranjit Singh (IND)	+0.702

==== Heat 2 ====
Rank	Athlete	Gap
1	Xu Chao (CHN)	
2	Shah Firdaus Sahrom (MAS)	+0.106
3	Oh Je-seok (KOR)	+0.110
4	Esow Alben (IND)	+0.259
5	Terry Yudha Kusuma (INA)	+0.523
6	Law Tsz Chun (HKG)	+2.786

==== Heat 3 ====
Rank	Athlete	Gap
1	Yudai Nitta (JPN)	
2	Azizulhasni Awang (MAS)	+0.036
3	Pongthep Tapimay (THA)	+0.139
4	Bi Wenjun (CHN)	+0.315
5	Pavel Vorzhev (KAZ)	+0.249
6	Mohammad Daneshvar (IRI)	+1.036

=== First round repechages ===
==== Heat 1 ====
Rank	Athlete	Gap
1	Jai Angsuthasawit (THA)	
2	Bi Wenjun (CHN)	+0.456
3	Sergey Ponomaryov (KAZ)	+0.534
4	Mohammad Daneshvar (IRI)	+0.606
5	Terry Yudha Kusuma (INA)	+0.863
6	Esow Alben (IND)	+1.122

==== Heat 2 ====
Rank	Athlete	Gap
1	Pavel Vorzhev (KAZ)	
2	Puguh Admadi (INA)	+0.072
3	Oh Je-seok (KOR)	+0.095
4	Ehsan Khademi (IRI)	+0.303
5	Ranjit Singh (IND)	+0.805
6	Law Tsz Chun (HKG)	+0.813
7	Pongthep Tapimay (THA)	REL

=== Second round ===
==== Heat 1 ====
Rank	Athlete	Gap
1	Jai Angsuthasawit (THA)	
2	Yudai Nitta (JPN)	+0.069
3	Azizulhasni Awang (MAS)	+0.087
4	Oh Je-seok (KOR)	+0.446
5	Pavel Vorzhev (KAZ)	+0.535
6	Bi Wenjun (CHN)	+0.762

==== Heat 2 ====
Rank	Athlete	Gap
1	Yuta Wakimoto (JPN)	
2	Im Chae-bin (KOR)	+0.040
3	Xu Chao (CHN)	+0.070
4	Sergey Ponomaryov (KAZ)	+0.183
5	Shah Firdaus Sahrom (MAS)	+0.569
6	Puguh Admadi (INA)	+0.619

=== Finals ===
==== Final 7–12 ====
Rank	Athlete	Gap
1	Shah Firdaus Sahrom (MAS)	
2	Bi Wenjun (CHN)	+0.102
3	Oh Je-seok (KOR)	+0.153
4	Puguh Admadi (INA)	+0.218
5	Pavel Vorzhev (KAZ)	+0.330
6	Sergey Ponomaryov (KAZ)	+0.764

==== Final 1–6 ====
Rank	Athlete	Gap
1	Jai Angsuthasawit (THA)	
2	Yudai Nitta (JPN)	+0.003
3	Azizulhasni Awang (MAS)	+0.062
4	Im Chae-bin (KOR)	+0.174
5	Yuta Wakimoto (JPN)	+0.255
6	Xu Chao (CHN)	+0.380

== Final standing ==
Rank	Athlete
1st place, gold medalist(s)	Jai Angsuthasawit (THA)
2nd place, silver medalist(s)	Yudai Nitta (JPN)
3rd place, bronze medalist(s)	Azizulhasni Awang (MAS)
4	Im Chae-bin (KOR)
5	Yuta Wakimoto (JPN)
6	Xu Chao (CHN)
7	Shah Firdaus Sahrom (MAS)
8	Bi Wenjun (CHN)
9	Oh Je-seok (KOR)
10	Puguh Admadi (INA)
11	Pavel Vorzhev (KAZ)
12	Sergey Ponomaryov (KAZ)
13	Mohammad Daneshvar (IRI)
13	Ehsan Khademi (IRI)
15	Terry Yudha Kusuma (INA)
15	Ranjit Singh (IND)
17	Law Tsz Chun (HKG)
17	Esow Alben (IND)
19	Pongthep Tapimay (THA)
