= Cycling at the 2020 Summer Olympics – Men's sprint =

Men's sprint at the Games of the XXXII Olympiad
- Olympic track cycling
- Venues: Izu Velodrome
- Dates: 4–6 August 2021
- Competitors: 30 from 18 nations

Medalists
1st place, gold medalist(s)		Harrie Lavreysen	Netherlands
2nd place, silver medalist(s)		Jeffrey Hoogland	Netherlands
3rd place, bronze medalist(s)		Jack Carlin	Great Britain

The men's sprint event at the 2020 Summer Olympics took place from 4 to 6 August 2021 at the Izu Velodrome. 30 cyclists from 18 nations competed.

== Background ==
This will be the 27th appearance of the event, which has been held at every Summer Olympics except 1904 and 1912. Great Britain has won the last three sprint competitions.

== Qualification ==
A National Olympic Committee (NOC) could enter up to 2 qualified cyclists in the men's sprint. Qualification is entirely through the 2018–20 UCI nation rankings. The eight nations that qualify for the team sprint event may enter two cyclists each in the individual sprint (as well as the Keirin). The nations that qualify a cyclist through the Keirin rankings may also enter that cyclist in the sprint. Finally, seven places are allocated through the individual sprint rankings; these places must ensure that each of the five continents are represented. Because qualification was complete by the end of the 2020 UCI Track Cycling World Championships on 1 March 2020 (the last event that contributed to the 2018–20 rankings), qualification was unaffected by the COVID-19 pandemic.

== Competition format ==
For the first time since 2000, the sprint competition format is seeing significant changes. The number of main rounds is increasing from 5 to 6 and the number of repechages from 2 to 3. The competition begins, as usual, with a qualifying round of time trials (flying start 200 metres). The top 24 cyclists in the qualifying round (up from 18) qualify for match rounds. In each match round, the cyclists start side by side and must complete 3 laps of the track (750 metres). The last 200 metres are timed. The match rounds are as follows.

- Round 1 pairs the 24 cyclists into 12 heats; the winner of each advances to round 2 while the loser goes to the first repechage.
- The first repechage places the 12 cyclists into 4 heats of 3 cyclists each; the winner of each heat rejoins the round 1 winners in advancing to round 2 while the remaining cyclists are eliminated.
- Round 2 pairs the 16 cyclists into 8 heats; the winner of each advances to the 1/8 finals while the loser goes to the second repechage.
- The second repechage again has 4 heats, this time of 2 cyclists each; the winner of each rejoins the round 2 winners and advances to the 1/8 finals while the loser of each heat is eliminated.
- The 1/8 finals pairs the 12 cyclists into 6 heats; the winner of each advances to the quarterfinals while the loser goes to the third repechage.
- The third repechage has 2 heats of 3 cyclists each; the winner goes to the quarterfinals while all others are eliminated (the classification 9–12 race has been removed).
- The quarterfinals begins best-two-of-three matches; the 8 cyclists are paired into 4 quarterfinals. The winner of two races in each quarterfinal goes to the semifinals, while the loser is placed in the classification 5–8 race.
- The semifinals again uses best-two-of-three matches, with the 4 cyclists paired into 2 semifinals. The winner of each semifinal goes to the final, the loser goes to the bronze medal match.
- The finals round includes the final, bronze medal match, and classification 5–8 race. The final and bronze medal match are one-on-one, best-two-of-three in format; the classification 5–8 race is a single race of 4 cyclists.

== Schedule ==
All times are Japan Standard Time (UTC+9)

Date	Time	Round
4 August 2021	15:30; 16:35; 17:31; 18:13; 18:47	Qualifying; 1/32 finals 1/32 finals repechages 1/16 finals 1/16 finals repechages
5 August 2021	15:48; 16:21; 16:45; 18:27	1/8 finals 1/8 finals repechages Quarterfinals; Classification 5–8
6 August 2021	16:10; 18:00	Semifinals; Final

== Results ==
=== Qualifying ===
Rank	Cyclist	Nation	Time	Behind	Notes
1	Jeffrey Hoogland	Netherlands	9.215		Q, OR
2	Harrie Lavreysen	Netherlands	9.215	+0.000	Q
3	Jack Carlin	Great Britain	9.306	+0.091	Q
4	Nicholas Paul	Trinidad and Tobago	9.316	+0.101	Q
5	Denis Dmitriev	ROC	9.331	+0.116	Q
6	Jair Tjon En Fa	Suriname	9.472	+0.257	Q
7	Mateusz Rudyk	Poland	9.493	+0.278	Q
8	Jason Kenny	Great Britain	9.510	+0.295	Q
9	Yuta Wakimoto	Japan	9.518	+0.303	Q
10	Sébastien Vigier	France	9.551	+0.336	Q
11	Xu Chao	China	9.584	+0.369	Q
12	Nick Wammes	Canada	9.587	+0.372	Q
13	Stefan Bötticher	Germany	9.593	+0.378	Q
14	Patryk Rajkowski	Poland	9.594	+0.379	Q
15	Hugo Barrette	Canada	9.596	+0.381	Q
16	Kevin Quintero	Colombia	9.626	+0.411	Q
17	Azizulhasni Awang	Malaysia	9.626	+0.411	Q
18	Sam Webster	New Zealand	9.631	+0.416	Q
19	Maximilian Levy	Germany	9.646	+0.431	Q
20	Rayan Helal	France	9.669	+0.454	Q
21	Matthew Richardson	Australia	9.685	+0.470	Q
22	Nathan Hart	Australia	9.696	+0.481	Q
23	Muhammad Shah Firdaus Sahrom	Malaysia	9.700	+0.485	Q
24	Ethan Mitchell	New Zealand	9.705	+0.490	Q
25	Pavel Yakushevskiy	ROC	9.723	+0.508	
26	Yudai Nitta	Japan	9.728	+0.513	
27	Jean Spies	South Africa	9.787	+0.572	
28	Tomáš Bábek	Czech Republic	9.856	+0.641	
29	Sergey Ponomaryov	Kazakhstan	9.932	+0.717	
30	Kwesi Browne	Trinidad and Tobago	9.966	+0.751	

=== 1/32 finals ===
Heat	Rank	Cyclist	Nation	Gap	Notes
1	1	Jeffrey Hoogland	Netherlands	X	Q
1	2	Ethan Mitchell	New Zealand	+0.233	R
2	1	Harrie Lavreysen	Netherlands	X	Q
2	2	Muhammad Shah Firdaus Sahrom	Malaysia	+0.063	R
3	1	Jack Carlin	Great Britain	X	Q
3	2	Nathan Hart	Australia	+0.306	R
4	1	Nicholas Paul	Trinidad and Tobago	X	Q
4	2	Matthew Richardson	Australia	+0.618	R
5	1	Denis Dmitriev	ROC	X	Q
5	2	Rayan Helal	France	+0.479	R
6	1	Maximilian Levy	Germany	X	Q
6	2	Jair Tjon En Fa	Suriname	+0.002	R
7	1	Sam Webster	New Zealand	X	Q
7	2	Mateusz Rudyk	Poland	+0.180	R
8	1	Jason Kenny	Great Britain	X	Q
8	2	Azizulhasni Awang	Malaysia	+0.032	R
9	1	Yuta Wakimoto	Japan	X	Q
9	2	Kevin Quintero	Colombia	+0.084	R
10	1	Sébastien Vigier	France	X	Q
10	2	Hugo Barrette	Canada	+0.020	R
11	1	Patryk Rajkowski	Poland	X	Q
11	2	Xu Chao	China	+0.291	R
12	1	Nick Wammes	Canada	X	Q
12	2	Stefan Bötticher	Germany	+0.015	R

=== 1/32 finals repechages ===
Heat	Rank	Cyclist	Nation	Gap	Notes
1	1	Azizulhasni Awang	Malaysia	X	Q
1	2	Kevin Quintero	Colombia	+0.204	
1	3	Ethan Mitchell	New Zealand	+0.549	
2	1	Muhammad Shah Firdaus Sahrom	Malaysia	X	Q
2	2	Hugo Barrette	Canada	+0.619	
2	3	Mateusz Rudyk	Poland	+0.668	
3	1	Jair Tjon En Fa	Suriname	X	Q
3	2	Xu Chao	China	+0.062	
3	3	Nathan Hart	Australia	+0.185	
4	1	Stefan Bötticher	Germany	X	Q
4	2	Rayan Helal	France	+0.032	
4	3	Matthew Richardson	Australia	+0.421	

=== 1/16 finals ===
Heat	Rank	Cyclist	Nation	Gap	Notes
1	1	Jeffrey Hoogland	Netherlands	X	Q
1	2	Stefan Bötticher	Germany	+0.111	R
2	1	Harrie Lavreysen	Netherlands	X	Q
2	2	Jair Tjon En Fa	Suriname	+0.259	R
3	1	Jack Carlin	Great Britain	X	Q
3	2	Muhammad Shah Firdaus Sahrom	Malaysia	+0.132	R
4	1	Nicholas Paul	Trinidad and Tobago	X	Q
4	2	Azizulhasni Awang	Malaysia	+0.026	R
5	1	Denis Dmitriev	ROC	X	Q
5	2	Nick Wammes	Canada	+0.107	R
6	1	Maximilian Levy	Germany	X	Q
6	2	Patryk Rajkowski	Poland	+0.149	R
7	1	Sam Webster	New Zealand	X	Q
7	2	Sébastien Vigier	France	+0.038	R
8	1	Jason Kenny	Great Britain	X	Q
8	2	Yuta Wakimoto	Japan	+0.021	R

=== 1/16 finals repechages ===
Heat	Rank	Cyclist	Nation	Gap	Notes
1	1	Yuta Wakimoto	Japan	X	Q
1	2	Stefan Bötticher	Germany	+0.176	
2	1	Sébastien Vigier	France	X	Q
2	2	Jair Tjon En Fa	Suriname	+0.085	
3	1	Muhammad Shah Firdaus Sahrom	Malaysia	X	Q
3	2	Patryk Rajkowski	Poland	+0.260	
4	1	Azizulhasni Awang	Malaysia	X	Q
4	2	Nick Wammes	Canada	+0.104	

=== 1/8 finals ===
Heat	Rank	Cyclist	Nation	Gap	Notes
1	1	Jeffrey Hoogland	Netherlands	X	Q
1	2	Azizulhasni Awang	Malaysia	+0.040	R
2	1	Harrie Lavreysen	Netherlands	X	Q
2	2	Muhammad Shah Firdaus Sahrom	Malaysia	+0.449	R
3	1	Jack Carlin	Great Britain	X	Q
3	2	Sébastien Vigier	France	+0.171	R
4	1	Nicholas Paul	Trinidad and Tobago	X	Q
4	2	Yuta Wakimoto	Japan	+0.457	R
5	1	Denis Dmitriev	ROC	X	Q
5	2	Jason Kenny	Great Britain	+0.076	R
6	1	Maximilian Levy	Germany	X	Q
6	2	Sam Webster	New Zealand	+0.132	R

=== 1/8 finals repechages ===
Heat	Rank	Cyclist	Nation	Gap	Notes
1	1	Jason Kenny	Great Britain	X	Q
1	2	Azizulhasni Awang	Malaysia	+0.042	
1	3	Yuta Wakimoto	Japan	+0.325	
2	1	Sébastien Vigier	France	X	Q
2	2	Sam Webster	New Zealand	+0.101	
2	3	Muhammad Shah Firdaus Sahrom	Malaysia	+0.133	

=== Quarterfinals ===
Heat	Rank	Cyclist	Nation	Race 1	Race 2	Decider (i.r.)	Notes
1	1	Jeffrey Hoogland	Netherlands	X	X		SF
1	2	Sébastien Vigier	France	+2.440	+0.059		F5-8
2	1	Harrie Lavreysen	Netherlands	X	X		SF
2	2	Jason Kenny	Great Britain	+0.047	+0.942		F5-8
3	1	Jack Carlin	Great Britain	X	X		SF
3	2	Maximilian Levy	Germany	+2.507	+0.396		F5-8
4	1	Denis Dmitriev	ROC	+0.295	X	X	SF
4	2	Nicholas Paul	Trinidad and Tobago	X	REL	+4.383	F5-8

=== Classification 5–8 ===
Rank	Cyclist	Nation	Gap
5	Maximilian Levy	Germany	
6	Nicholas Paul	Trinidad and Tobago	+0.152
7	Sébastien Vigier	France	+0.644
8	Jason Kenny	Great Britain	+0.879

=== Semifinals ===
Heat	Rank	Cyclist	Nation	Race 1	Race 2	Decider (i.r.)	Notes
1	1	Jeffrey Hoogland	Netherlands	X	X		QG
1	2	Denis Dmitriev	ROC	+0.107	+0.010		QB
2	1	Harrie Lavreysen	Netherlands	X	X		QG
2	2	Jack Carlin	Great Britain	+0.067	+0.042		QB

=== Finals ===
Rank	Cyclist	Nation	Race 1	Race 2	Decider (i.r.)
Gold medal final
1st place, gold medalist(s)	Harrie Lavreysen	Netherlands	+0.012	X	X
2nd place, silver medalist(s)	Jeffrey Hoogland	Netherlands	X	+0.015	+0.208
Bronze medal final
3rd place, bronze medalist(s)	Jack Carlin	Great Britain	X	X	
4	Denis Dmitriev	ROC	+0.486	+0.015	
