= Cycling at the 2018 Asian Games – Men's team sprint =

Men's team sprint at the 2018 Asian Games
- Venue: Jakarta International Velodrome
- Date: 27 August 2018
- Competitors: 30 from 10 nations

Medalists
gold medal	China; Li Jianxin, Xu Chao, Zhou Yu
silver medal	Malaysia; Azizulhasni Awang, Shah Firdaus Sahrom, Fadhil Zonis
bronze medal	Japan; Kazuki Amagai, Yudai Nitta, Tomohiro Fukaya

The men's team sprint competition at the 2018 Asian Games was held on 27 August at the Jakarta International Velodrome.

== Schedule ==
All times are Western Indonesia Time (UTC+07:00)

Date	Time	Event
Monday, 27 August 2018	13:14	Qualifying
Monday, 27 August 2018	15:37	Finals

== Records ==
Prior to this competition, the existing world, Asian and Games records were as follows.

World Record	Germany	41.871	Aguascalientes, Mexico	5 December 2013
Asian Record	Japan	43.092	Aguascalientes, Mexico	5 December 2013
Games Record	China	44.406	Guangzhou, China	10 November 2010

== Results ==
=== Qualifying ===
Rank	Team	Time	Notes
1	Malaysia (MAS); Azizulhasni Awang; Shah Firdaus Sahrom; Fadhil Zonis	43.934	GR
2	China (CHN); Li Jianxin; Xu Chao; Zhou Yu	43.996	
3	South Korea (KOR); Son Je-yong; Seok Hye-yun; Im Chae-bin	44.224	
4	Japan (JPN); Kazuki Amagai; Yudai Nitta; Tomohiro Fukaya	44.489	
5	Indonesia (INA); Rio Akbar; Puguh Admadi; Terry Yudha Kusuma	44.859	
6	Kazakhstan (KAZ); Maxim Nalyotov; Sergey Ponomaryov; Pavel Vorzhev	44.889	
7	Iran (IRI); Ali Aliasgari; Ehsan Khademi; Mohammad Daneshvar	45.324	
8	Thailand (THA); Jaturong Niwanti; Satjakul Sianglam; Jai Angsuthasawit	45.920	
9	India (IND); Appolonious; Esow Alben; Ranjit Singh	46.862	
10	Hong Kong (HKG); Victor Lau; Ho Burr; Law Tsz Chun	48.830	

=== Finals ===
==== Bronze ====
Rank	Team	Time	Notes
3rd place, bronze medalist(s)	Japan (JPN); Kazuki Amagai; Yudai Nitta; Tomohiro Fukaya	43.899	GR
4	South Korea (KOR); Son Je-yong; Seok Hye-yun; Im Chae-bin	43.976	

==== Gold ====
Rank	Team	Time	Notes
1st place, gold medalist(s)	China (CHN); Li Jianxin; Xu Chao; Zhou Yu	44.160	
2nd place, silver medalist(s)	Malaysia (MAS); Azizulhasni Awang; Shah Firdaus Sahrom; Fadhil Zonis	44.598	
