= 2020 UCI Track Cycling World Championships – Men's keirin =

Sports competition

Men's keirin at the 2020 UCI Track Cycling World Championships
- Venue: Velodrom
- Location: Berlin, Germany
- Dates: 27 February
- Competitors: 28 from 17 nations

Medalists
| gold medal | Harrie Lavreysen | Netherlands |
| silver medal | Yuta Wakimoto | Japan |
| bronze medal | Azizulhasni Awang | Malaysia |

The Men's keirin competition at the 2020 UCI Track Cycling World Championships was held on 27 February 2020.

== Results ==
=== First round ===
The first round was started at 14:30. The first two riders in each heat qualified for the quarterfinals, all other riders moved to the repechages.

Heat 1

| Rank | Name | Nation | Gap | Notes |
|---|---|---|---|---|
| 1 | Harrie Lavreysen | Netherlands | | Q |
| 2 | Azizulhasni Awang | Malaysia | +0.244 | Q |
| 3 | Stefan Bötticher | Germany | +0.386 | |
| 4 | Shane Perkins | Russia | +0.697 | |
| 5 | Jean Spies | South Africa | +0.843 | |

Heat 3

| Rank | Name | Nation | Gap | Notes |
|---|---|---|---|---|
| 1 | Jeffrey Hoogland | Netherlands | | Q |
| 2 | Krzysztof Maksel | Poland | +0.071 | Q |
| 3 | Jai Angsuthasawit | Thailand | +0.135 | |
| 4 | Kevin Quintero | Colombia | +0.452 | |
| 5 | Jason Kenny | Great Britain | +0.500 | |
| 6 | Juan Peralta | Spain | +0.668 | |

Heat 5

| Rank | Name | Nation | Gap | Notes |
|---|---|---|---|---|
| 1 | Yuta Wakimoto | Japan | | Q |
| 2 | Matthijs Büchli | Netherlands | +0.175 | Q |
| 3 | Sam Webster | New Zealand | +0.256 | |
| 4 | Tomáš Bábek | Czech Republic | +0.572 | |
| 5 | Kang Shih-feng | Chinese Taipei | +0.617 | |
| 6 | Santiago Ramírez | Colombia | +0.717 | |

Heat 2

| Rank | Name | Nation | Gap | Notes |
|---|---|---|---|---|
| 1 | Rayan Helal | France | | Q |
| 2 | Jack Carlin | Great Britain | +0.060 | Q |
| 3 | Maximilian Levy | Germany | +0.069 | |
| 4 | Yudai Nitta | Japan | +0.167 | |
| 5 | Hersony Canelón | Venezuela | +0.747 | |

Heat 4

| Rank | Name | Nation | Gap | Notes |
|---|---|---|---|---|
| 1 | Sebastien Vigier | France | | Q |
| 2 | Denis Dmitriev | Russia | +0.136 | Q |
| 3 | Theo Bos | Netherlands | +0.256 | |
| 4 | Sergey Ponomaryov | Kazakhstan | +0.407 | |
| 5 | Edward Dawkins | New Zealand | +0.480 | |
| 6 | Tomoyuki Kawabata | Japan | +0.617 | |

=== First round repechage ===
The first round repechage was started at 15:40. The first two riders in each heat qualified for the quarterfinals.

Heat 1

| Rank | Name | Nation | Gap | Notes |
|---|---|---|---|---|
| 1 | Stefan Bötticher | Germany | | Q |
| 2 | Sergey Ponomaryov | Kazakhstan | +0.056 | Q |
| 3 | Juan Peralta | Spain | +0.068 | |
| 4 | Tomáš Bábek | Czech Republic | +0.261 | |

Heat 3

| Rank | Name | Nation | Gap | Notes |
|---|---|---|---|---|
| 1 | Yudai Nitta | Japan | | Q |
| 2 | Jai Angsuthasawit | Thailand | +0.052 | Q |
| 3 | Edward Dawkins | New Zealand | +0.246 | |
| 4 | Santiago Ramírez | Colombia | +0.250 | |
| 5 | Jean Spies | South Africa | +0.559 | |

Heat 2

| Rank | Name | Nation | Gap | Notes |
|---|---|---|---|---|
| 1 | Tomoyuki Kawabata | Japan | | Q |
| 2 | Kang Shih-feng | Chinese Taipei | +0.254 | Q |
| 3 | Shane Perkins | Russia | +0.259 | |
| 4 | Kevin Quintero | Colombia | +0.367 | |
| 5 | Maximilian Levy | Germany | +0.450 | |

Heat 4

| Rank | Name | Nation | Gap | Notes |
|---|---|---|---|---|
| 1 | Jason Kenny | Great Britain | | Q |
| 2 | Sam Webster | New Zealand | +0.073 | Q |
| 3 | Hersony Canelón | Venezuela | +0.079 | |
| 4 | Theo Bos | Netherlands | +1.966 | |

=== Quarterfinals ===
The quarterfinals were started at 16:36. The first four riders in each heat qualified for the semifinals.

Heat 1

| Rank | Name | Nation | Gap | Notes |
|---|---|---|---|---|
| 1 | Harrie Lavreysen | Netherlands | | Q |
| 2 | Sébastien Vigier | France | +0.013 | Q |
| 3 | Sergey Ponomaryov | Kazakhstan | +0.071 | Q |
| 4 | Jack Carlin | Great Britain | +0.080 | Q |
| 5 | Tomoyuki Kawabata | Japan | +0.101 | |
| 6 | Sam Webster | New Zealand | +0.483 | |

Heat 3

| Rank | Name | Nation | Gap | Notes |
|---|---|---|---|---|
| 1 | Yudai Nitta | Japan | | Q |
| 2 | Azizulhasni Awang | Malaysia | +0.153 | Q |
| 3 | Jeffrey Hoogland | Netherlands | +0.199 | Q |
| 4 | Stefan Bötticher | Germany | +0.212 | Q |
| 5 | Denis Dmitriev | Russia | +0.260 | |
| 6 | Kang Shih-feng | Chinese Taipei | +0.294 | |

Heat 2

| Rank | Name | Nation | Gap | Notes |
|---|---|---|---|---|
| 1 | Matthijs Büchli | Netherlands | | Q |
| 2 | Yuta Wakimoto | Japan | +0.001 | Q |
| 3 | Rayan Helal | France | +0.100 | Q |
| 4 | Jason Kenny | Great Britain | +2.405 | Q |
| – | Krzysztof Maksel | Poland | Did not finish | |
| – | Jai Angsuthasawit | Thailand | Did not finish | |

=== Semifinals ===
The semifinals were started at 19:14. The first three riders in each heat qualified for the final, all other riders raced for places 7 to 12.

Heat 1

| Rank | Name | Nation | Gap | Notes |
|---|---|---|---|---|
| 1 | Yuta Wakimoto | Japan | | Q |
| 2 | Sergey Ponomaryov | Kazakhstan | +0.477 | Q |
| 3 | Harrie Lavreysen | Netherlands | +0.480 | Q |
| 4 | Jason Kenny | Great Britain | +0.481 | |
| 5 | Sébastien Vigier | France | +0.702 | |
| 6 | Jeffrey Hoogland | Netherlands | +0.762 | |

Heat 2

| Rank | Name | Nation | Gap | Notes |
|---|---|---|---|---|
| 1 | Azizulhasni Awang | Malaysia | | Q |
| 2 | Stefan Bötticher | Germany | +0.234 | Q |
| 3 | Jack Carlin | Great Britain | +0.239 | Q |
| 4 | Matthijs Büchli | Netherlands | +0.316 | |
| 5 | Yudai Nitta | Japan | +0.416 | |
| 6 | Rayan Helal | France | +1.232 | |

=== Finals ===
The finals were started at 20:42.

==== Small final ====
| Rank | Name | Nation | Gap | Notes |
|---|---|---|---|---|
| 7 | Jeffrey Hoogland | Netherlands | | |
| 8 | Jason Kenny | Great Britain | +0.082 | |
| 9 | Rayan Helal | France | +0.868 | |
| 10 | Sébastien Vigier | France | +3.278 | |
| 11 | Matthijs Büchli | Netherlands | Did not finish | |
| 12 | Yudai Nitta | Japan | Relegated | |

==== Final ====
| Rank | Name | Nation | Gap | Notes |
|---|---|---|---|---|
| 1st place, gold medalist(s) | Harrie Lavreysen | Netherlands | | |
| 2nd place, silver medalist(s) | Yuta Wakimoto | Japan | +0.036 | |
| 3rd place, bronze medalist(s) | Azizulhasni Awang | Malaysia | +0.108 | |
| 4 | Jack Carlin | Great Britain | +0.348 | |
| 5 | Stefan Bötticher | Germany | +0.668 | |
| 6 | Sergey Ponomaryov | Kazakhstan | +1.148 | |
