= 2020 UCI Track Cycling World Championships – Men's sprint =

Men's sprint at the 2020 UCI Track Cycling World Championships
- Venue: Velodrom
- Location: Berlin, Germany
- Dates: 29 February – 1 March
- Competitors: 35 from 21 nations

Medalists
gold medal	Harrie Lavreysen	Netherlands
silver medal	Jeffrey Hoogland	Netherlands
bronze medal	Azizulhasni Awang	Malaysia

The Men's sprint competition at the 2020 UCI Track Cycling World Championships was held on 29 February and 1 March 2020.

== Results ==
=== Qualifying ===
The qualifying was started on 29 February at 11:25. The top four riders advanced directly to the 1/8 finals; places 5 to 28 advanced to the 1/16 finals.

Rank	Name	Nation	Time	Behind	Notes
1	Harrie Lavreysen	Netherlands	9.253		Q
2	Jeffrey Hoogland	Netherlands	9.322	+0.069	Q
3	Mateusz Rudyk	Poland	9.434	+0.181	Q
4	Denis Dmitriev	Russia	9.522	+0.269	Q
5	Azizulhasni Awang	Malaysia	9.548	+0.295	q
6	Nicholas Paul	Trinidad and Tobago	9.556	+0.303	q
7	Jason Kenny	Great Britain	9.561	+0.308	q
8	Yudai Nitta	Japan	9.562	+0.309	q
9	Quentin Caleyron	France	9.564	+0.311	q
10	Stefan Bötticher	Germany	9.568	+0.315	q
11	Matthijs Büchli	Netherlands	9.575	+0.322	q
12	Sebastien Vigier	France	9.595	+0.342	q
13	Tomohiro Fukaya	Japan	9.607	+0.354	q
14	Muhammad Shah Firdaus Sahrom	Malaysia	9.609	+0.356	q
15	Sam Webster	New Zealand	9.615	+0.362	q
16	Nathan Hart	Australia	9.624	+0.371	q
17	Matthew Richardson	Australia	9.628	+0.375	q
18	Sándor Szalontay	Hungary	9.650	+0.397	q
19	Jack Carlin	Great Britain	9.659	+0.406	q
20	Juan Peralta	Spain	9.668	+0.415	q
21	Jair Tjon En Fa	Suriname	9.668	+0.415	q
22	Zhou Yu	China	9.674	+0.421	q
23	Kevin Quintero	Colombia	9.682	+0.429	q
24	Xu Chao	China	9.693	+0.440	q
25	Sam Ligtlee	Netherlands	9.704	+0.451	q
26	Ethan Mitchell	New Zealand	9.753	+0.500	q
27	Hsieh Nien-hsing	Chinese Taipei	9.764	+0.511	q
28	Vasilijus Lendel	Lithuania	9.765	+0.512	q
29	Pavel Kelemen	Czech Republic	9.784	+0.531	
30	Law Tsz Chun	Hong Kong	9.807	+0.554	
31	Martin Čechman	Czech Republic	9.835	+0.582	
32	Santiago Ramírez	Colombia	9.936	+0.683	
33	Muhammad Fadhil Mohd Zonis	Malaysia	9.945	+0.692	
34	Jean Spies	South Africa	10.184	+0.931	
	Pavel Yakushevskiy	Russia	Did not finish		

=== 1/16 finals ===
The 1/16 finals were started on 29 February at 12.35. Heat winners advanced to the 1/8 finals.

Heat	Rank	Name	Nation	Gap	Notes
1	1	Azizulhasni Awang	Malaysia	X	Q
1	2	Vasilijus Lendel	Lithuania	+0.279	
2	1	Nicholas Paul	Trinidad and Tobago	X	Q
2	2	Hsieh Nien-hsing	Chinese Taipei	+0.093	
3	1	Jason Kenny	Great Britain	X	Q
3	2	Ethan Mitchell	New Zealand	+1.259	
4	1	Yudai Nitta	Japan	X	Q
4	2	Sam Ligtlee	Netherlands	+0.050	
5	1	Quentin Caleyron	France	X	Q
5	2	Xu Chao	China	+0.165	
6	1	Stefan Bötticher	Germany	X	Q
6	2	Kevin Quintero	Colombia	+0.035	
7	1	Matthijs Büchli	Netherlands	X	Q
7	2	Zhou Yu	China	+0.041	
8	1	Jair Tjon En Fa	Suriname	X	Q
8	2	Sebastien Vigier	France	+0.006	
9	1	Tomohiro Fukaya	Japan	X	Q
9	2	Juan Peralta	Spain	+0.094	
10	1	Muhammad Shah Firdaus Sahrom	Malaysia	X	Q
10	2	Jack Carlin	Great Britain	+0.032	
11	1	Sam Webster	New Zealand	X	Q
11	2	Sándor Szalontay	Hungary	+0.096	
12	1	Nathan Hart	Australia	X	Q
12	2	Matthew Richardson	Australia	+0.072	

=== 1/8 finals ===
The 1/8 finalswere started on 29 February at 14:16. Heat winners advanced to the quarterfinals.

Heat	Rank	Name	Nation	Gap	Notes
1	1	Harrie Lavreysen	Netherlands	X	Q
1	2	Nathan Hart	Australia	+0.347	
2	1	Jeffrey Hoogland	Netherlands	X	Q
2	2	Sam Webster	New Zealand	+0.049	
3	1	Mateusz Rudyk	Poland	X	Q
3	2	Muhammad Shah Firdaus Sahrom	Malaysia	+0.001	
4	1	Tomohiro Fukaya	Japan	X	Q
4	2	Denis Dmitriev	Russia	+0.396	
5	1	Azizulhasni Awang	Malaysia	X	Q
5	2	Jair Tjon En Fa	Suriname	+0.120	
6	1	Matthijs Büchli	Netherlands	X	Q
6	2	Nicholas Paul	Trinidad and Tobago	+0.048	
7	1	Stefan Bötticher	Germany	X	Q
7	2	Jason Kenny	Great Britain	+0.047	
8	1	Yudai Nitta	Japan	X	Q
8	2	Quentin Caleyron	France	+0.071	

=== Quarterfinals ===
The quarterfinals were started on 29 February at 16:52. Matches are extended to a best-of-three format hereon; winners proceed to the semifinals.

Heat	Rank	Name	Nation	Race 1	Race 2	Decider (i.r.)	Notes
1	1	Harrie Lavreysen	Netherlands	X	X		Q
1	2	Yudai Nitta	Japan	+0.106	+0.151		
2	1	Jeffrey Hoogland	Netherlands	X	X		Q
2	2	Stefan Bötticher	Germany	+0.126	+0.150		
3	1	Mateusz Rudyk	Poland	X	X		Q
3	2	Matthijs Büchli	Netherlands	+0.131	+0.185		
4	1	Azizulhasni Awang	Malaysia	X	X		Q
4	2	Tomohiro Fukaya	Japan	+0.083	+0.000		

=== Semifinals ===
The semifinals were started on 1 March at 11:00.

Heat	Rank	Name	Nation	Race 1	Race 2	Decider (i.r.)	Notes
1	1	Harrie Lavreysen	Netherlands	X	X		Q
1	2	Azizulhasni Awang	Malaysia	+0.475	+0.330		
2	1	Jeffrey Hoogland	Netherlands	X	X		Q
2	2	Mateusz Rudyk	Poland	+0.653	+0.113		

=== Finals ===
The finals were started on 1 March at 14:39.

Rank	Name	Nation	Race 1	Race 2	Decider (i.r.)
Gold medal race
1st place, gold medalist(s)	Harrie Lavreysen	Netherlands	X	X	
2nd place, silver medalist(s)	Jeffrey Hoogland	Netherlands	+0.064	+0.195	
Bronze medal race
3rd place, bronze medalist(s)	Azizulhasni Awang	Malaysia	X	X	
4	Mateusz Rudyk	Poland	+0.000	+0.853	
