= 2017 UCI Track Cycling World Championships – Men's keirin =

Men's keirin at the 2017 UCI Track Cycling World Championships
- Venue: Hong Kong Velodrome
- Location: Hong Kong
- Dates: 13 April
- Competitors: 28 from 16 nations

Medalists
| gold medal | Azizulhasni Awang | Malaysia |
| silver medal | Fabián Puerta | Colombia |
| bronze medal | Tomáš Bábek | Czech Republic |

The Men's keirin competition at the 2017 World Championships was held on 13 April 2017.

== Results ==
=== First round ===
The first two riders in each heat qualified to the second round, all other riders advanced to the first round repechages.

==== Heat 1 ====
| Rank | Name | Nation | Gap | Notes |
|---|---|---|---|---|
| 1 | Matthew Glaetzer | Australia | | Q |
| 2 | François Pervis | France | +0.113 | Q |
| 3 | Lewis Oliva | Great Britain | +0.206 | |
| 4 | Joachim Eilers | Germany | +0.234 | |
| 5 | Hugo Barrette | Canada | +0.298 | |
| 6 | Zac Williams | New Zealand | +0.307 | |
| 7 | Santiago Ramírez | Colombia | +0.373 | |

==== Heat 2 ====
| Rank | Name | Nation | Gap | Notes |
|---|---|---|---|---|
| 1 | Eddie Dawkins | New Zealand | | Q |
| 2 | Tomáš Bábek | Czech Republic | +0.059 | Q |
| 3 | Kang Shih Feng | Chinese Taipei | +0.117 | |
| 4 | Maximilian Dornbach | Germany | +0.155 | |
| 5 | Tomoyuki Kawabata | Japan | +0.234 | |
| 6 | Francesco Ceci | Italy | +0.443 | |
| 7 | Vasilijus Lendel | Lithuania | +0.468 | |

==== Heat 3 ====
| Rank | Name | Nation | Gap | Notes |
|---|---|---|---|---|
| 1 | Fabián Puerta | Colombia | | Q |
| 2 | Azizulhasni Awang | Malaysia | +0.041 | Q |
| 3 | Yuta Wakimoto | Japan | +0.118 | |
| 4 | Kwesi Browne | Trinidad and Tobago | +0.179 | |
| 5 | Quentin Lafargue | France | +0.207 | |
| 6 | Sergii Omelchenko | Azerbaijan | +0.346 | |
| 7 | David Sojka | Czech Republic | +0.507 | |

==== Heat 4 ====
| Rank | Name | Nation | Gap | Notes |
|---|---|---|---|---|
| 1 | Sam Webster | New Zealand | | Q |
| 2 | Joseph Truman | Great Britain | +0.092 | Q |
| 3 | Muhammad Sahrom | Malaysia | +0.096 | |
| 4 | Andriy Vynokurov | Ukraine | +0.205 | |
| 5 | Marc Jurczyk | Germany | +0.238 | |
| 6 | Pavel Kelemen | Czech Republic | +0.316 | |
| 7 | Yudai Nitta | Japan | +0.403 | |

- Q = qualified to Second round

=== First round repechage ===
The winner of each heat qualified to the second round.

==== Heat 1 ====
| Rank | Name | Nation | Gap | Notes |
|---|---|---|---|---|
| 1 | Andriy Vynokurov | Ukraine | | Q |
| 2 | Quentin Lafargue | France | | |
| 3 | Santiago Ramírez | Colombia | +0.047 | |
| 4 | Lewis Oliva | Great Britain | +0.103 | |
| 5 | Francesco Ceci | Italy | +0.174 | |

==== Heat 2 ====
| Rank | Name | Nation | Gap | Notes |
|---|---|---|---|---|
| 1 | Marc Jurczyk | Germany | | Q |
| 2 | Tomoyuki Kawabata | Japan | +0.117 | |
| 3 | Zac Williams | New Zealand | +0.168 | |
| 4 | Kang Shih Feng | Chinese Taipei | +0.208 | |
| 5 | David Sojka | Czech Republic | +0.572 | |

==== Heat 3 ====
| Rank | Name | Nation | Gap | Notes |
|---|---|---|---|---|
| 1 | Pavel Kelemen | Czech Republic | | Q |
| 2 | Maximilian Dornbach | Germany | +0.083 | |
| 3 | Kwesi Browne | Trinidad and Tobago | +0.105 | |
| 4 | Hugo Barrette | Canada | +0.123 | |
| 5 | Yuta Wakimoto | Japan | +0.276 | |

==== Heat 4 ====
| Rank | Name | Nation | Gap | Notes |
|---|---|---|---|---|
| 1 | Joachim Eilers | Germany | | Q |
| 2 | Muhammad Sahrom | Malaysia | +0.061 | |
| 3 | Sergii Omelchenko | Azerbaijan | +0.164 | |
| 4 | Vasilijus Lendel | Lithuania | +0.527 | |
| 5 | Yudai Nitta | Japan | +0.981 | |

- Q = qualified to Second round

=== Second round ===
The first three riders in each heat qualify to final 1-6, all other riders advance to final 7-12.

==== Heat 1 ====
| Rank | Name | Nation | Gap | Notes |
|---|---|---|---|---|
| 1 | Matthew Glaetzer | Australia | | Q |
| 2 | Tomáš Bábek | Czech Republic | +0.156 | Q |
| 3 | Azizulhasni Awang | Malaysia | +0.172 | Q |
| 4 | Sam Webster | New Zealand | +0.376 | |
| 5 | Andriy Vynokurov | Ukraine | +0.509 | |
| 6 | Joachim Eilers | Germany | | REL |

==== Heat 2 ====
| Rank | Name | Nation | Gap | Notes |
|---|---|---|---|---|
| 1 | Fabián Puerta | Colombia | | Q |
| 2 | Marc Jurczyk | Germany | +0.082 | Q |
| 3 | Pavel Kelemen | Czech Republic | +0.130 | Q |
| 4 | Eddie Dawkins | New Zealand | +0.164 | |
| 5 | Joseph Truman | Great Britain | +1.226 | |
| 6 | François Pervis | France | | REL |

=== Finals ===
The finals were started at 21:33.

==== Small final ====
| Rank | Name | Nation | Gap | Notes |
|---|---|---|---|---|
| 7 | Joachim Eilers | Germany | | |
| 8 | Joseph Truman | Great Britain | +0.066 | |
| 9 | Andriy Vynokurov | Ukraine | +0.126 | |
| 10 | François Pervis | France | +0.267 | |
| 11 | Sam Webster | New Zealand | +0.368 | |
| 12 | Eddie Dawkins | New Zealand | +1.676 | |

==== Final ====
| Rank | Name | Nation | Gap | Notes |
|---|---|---|---|---|
| 1st place, gold medalist(s) | Azizulhasni Awang | Malaysia | | |
| 2nd place, silver medalist(s) | Fabián Puerta | Colombia | +0.382 | |
| 3rd place, bronze medalist(s) | Tomáš Bábek | Czech Republic | +0.417 | |
| 4 | Matthew Glaetzer | Australia | +0.473 | |
| 5 | Pavel Kelemen | Czech Republic | +0.590 | |
| 6 | Marc Jurczyk | Germany | +0.663 | |
