= 2010 UCI Track Cycling World Championships – Men's keirin =

Rainbow jersey

The Men's Keirin is one of the 10 men's events at the 2010 UCI Track Cycling World Championships, held in Ballerup, Denmark on 25 March 2010.

27 Cyclists from 16 countries participated in the contest. After the 4 qualifying heats, the fastest 2 riders in each heat advance to the second round. The remaining ones face a first round repechage

The riders that did not advance to the second round race in 4 repechage heats. The first rider in each heat advance to the second round along with the 8 that qualified before.

The first 3 riders from each of the 2 Second Round heats advance to the Final and the remaining will race a consolation 7–12 final.

== Results ==
=== First round ===
Rank	Heat	Name	Nation	Notes
1	1	Matthew Crampton	Great Britain	Q
2	1	Maximilian Levy	Germany	Q
3	1	Jason Niblett	Australia	
4	1	Francesco Ceci	Italy	
5	1	Charlie Conord	France	
6	1	Zafeirios Volikakis	Greece	
1	2	François Pervis	France	Q
2	2	Sam Webster	New Zealand	Q
3	2	Denis Špička	Czech Republic	
4	2	Kota Asai	Japan	
5	2	Carsten Bergemann	Germany	
6	2	Michael Thomson	South Africa	
7	2	Kasper Lindholm Jessen	Denmark	
1	3	Azizulhasni Awang	Malaysia	Q
2	3	Teun Mulder	Netherlands	Q
3	3	Christos Volikakis	Greece	
4	3	Michael Seidenbecher	Germany	
5	3	Simon Van Velthooven	New Zealand	
6	3	Adam Ptáčník	Czech Republic	
7	3	Kazunari Watanabe	Japan	
1	4	Chris Hoy	Great Britain	Q
2	4	Shane Perkins	Australia	Q
3	4	Roy van den Berg	Netherlands	
4	4	Andriy Vynokurov	Ukraine	
5	4	Travis Smith	Canada	
6	4	Bao Saifei	China	
	4	Josiah Ng	Malaysia	DSQ

=== First round repechage ===
Rank	Heat	Name	Nation	Notes
1	1	Simon Van Velthooven	New Zealand	Q
2	1	Denis Špička	Czech Republic	
3	1	Andriy Vynokurov	Ukraine	
4	1	Michael Thomson	South Africa	
1	2	Jason Niblett	Australia	Q
2	2	Travis Smith	Canada	
3	2	Francesco Ceci	Italy	
4	2	Kasper Lindholm Jessen	Denmark	
	2	Adam Ptáčník	Czech Republic	REL
1	3	Michael Seidenbecher	Germany	Q
2	3	Christos Volikakis	Greece	
3	3	Kazunari Watanabe	Japan	
4	3	Charlie Conord	France	
5	3	Bao Saifei	China	
1	4	Kota Asai	Japan	Q
2	4	Carsten Bergemann	Germany	
3	4	Zafeirios Volikakis	Greece	
4	4	Roy van den Berg	Netherlands	

=== Second round ===
Rank	Heat	Name	Nation	Notes
1	1	Chris Hoy	Great Britain	Q
2	1	Azizulhasni Awang	Malaysia	Q
3	1	Sam Webster	New Zealand	Q
4	1	Shane Perkins	Australia	
5	1	Michael Seidenbecher	Germany	
6	1	Kota Asai	Japan	
1	2	Maximilian Levy	Germany	Q
2	2	Teun Mulder	Netherlands	Q
3	2	François Pervis	France	Q
4	2	Simon Van Velthooven	New Zealand	
5	2	Jason Niblett	Australia	
6	2	Matthew Crampton	Great Britain	

=== Final 7-12 places ===
Rank	Name	Nation	Notes
7	Matthew Crampton	Great Britain	
8	Michael Seidenbecher	Germany	
9	Simon Van Velthooven	New Zealand	
10	Shane Perkins	Australia	
11	Jason Niblett	Australia	
	Kota Asai	Japan	DSQ

=== Final ===
Rank	Name	Nation	Notes
1st place, gold medalist(s)	Chris Hoy	Great Britain	
2nd place, silver medalist(s)	Azizulhasni Awang	Malaysia	
3rd place, bronze medalist(s)	Maximilian Levy	Germany	
4	Teun Mulder	Netherlands	
5	François Pervis	France	
6	Sam Webster	New Zealand	
