= Kasper Lindholm Jessen =

Danish cyclist

Personal information
- Born: 31 January 1985 (age 41)

Cycling career
- Sport: Cycling
- Discipline: Track cycling
- Role: Rider
- Rider type: sprinter

Kasper Lindholm Jessen (born 31 January 1985) is a Danish male track cyclist, riding for the national team. He competed in the sprint and keirin event at the 2010 UCI Track Cycling World Championships.
