= Kinyuka =

Kinyuka Sa-rā-ki
- village
- Location in Andaman and Nicobar Islands, India Kinyuka (India)
- Coordinates: 9.207580°N 92.815666°E
- Country: India
- State: Andaman and Nicobar Islands
- District: Nicobar
- Tehsil: Car Nicobar

Population (2011)
  - Total: 1,120
- Time zone: UTC+5:30 (IST)
- Census code: 645022

Kinyuka is a village in the Nicobar district of Andaman and Nicobar Islands, India. It is located in the Car Nicobar tehsil.

== Demographics ==
According to the 2011 census of India, Kinyuka has 309 households. The effective literacy rate (i.e. the literacy rate of population excluding children aged 6 and below) is 73.89%.

Demographics (2011 Census)
	Total	Male	Female
Population	1120	558	562
Children aged below 6 years	128	62	66
Scheduled caste	0	0	0
Scheduled tribe	1073	526	547
Literates	733	387	346
Workers (all)	323	225	98
Main workers (total)	105	77	28
Main workers: Cultivators	4	4	0
Main workers: Agricultural labourers	1	1	0
Main workers: Household industry workers	2	2	0
Main workers: Other	98	70	28
Marginal workers (total)	218	148	70
Marginal workers: Cultivators	2	1	1
Marginal workers: Agricultural labourers	10	6	4
Marginal workers: Household industry workers	112	92	20
Marginal workers: Others	94	49	45
Non-workers	797	333	464
