= Tomohiro Fukaya =

Japanese cyclist (born 1990)

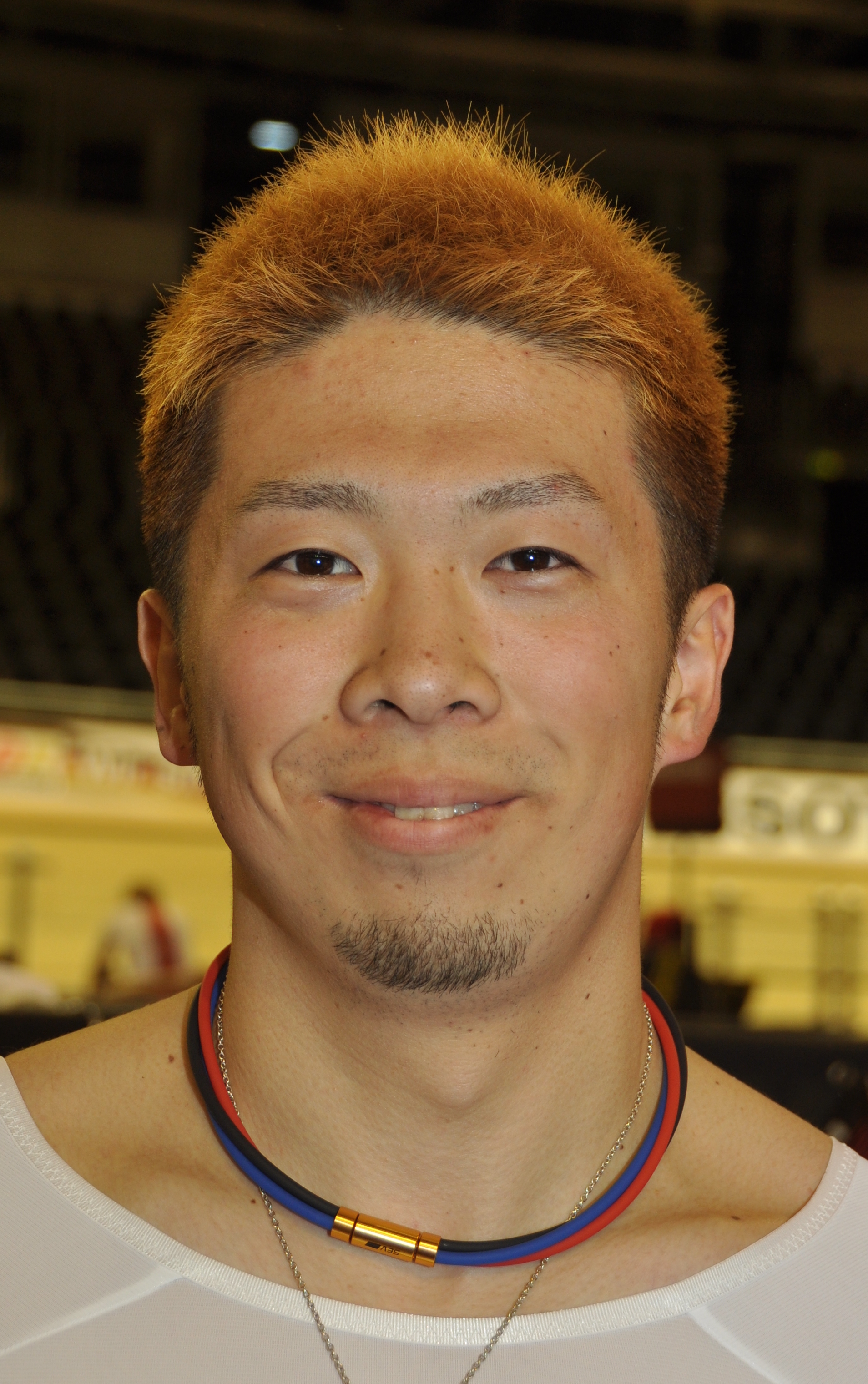
- Fukaya in 2018

Personal information
- Born: 1 March 1990 (age 36) Anjō, Aichi, Japan

Cycling career
- Sport: Cycling
- Role: Rider
Medal record
Men's track cycling
Representing Japan
Asian Games
Silver medal – second place	2018 Jakarta	Sprint
Bronze medal – third place	2018 Jakarta	Team sprint
Asian Championships
Gold medal – first place	2018 Nilai	1 km time trial
Gold medal – first place	2019 Jakarta	Team sprint
Gold medal – first place	2020 Jincheon	Team sprint
Bronze medal – third place	2020 Jincheon	Sprint

Tomohiro Fukaya (深谷知広, Fukaya Tomohiro; born 1 March 1990) is a Japanese born racing cyclist. He rode in the men's sprint event at the 2020 UCI Track Cycling World Championships.
