= Michael Seidenbecher =

German track cyclist

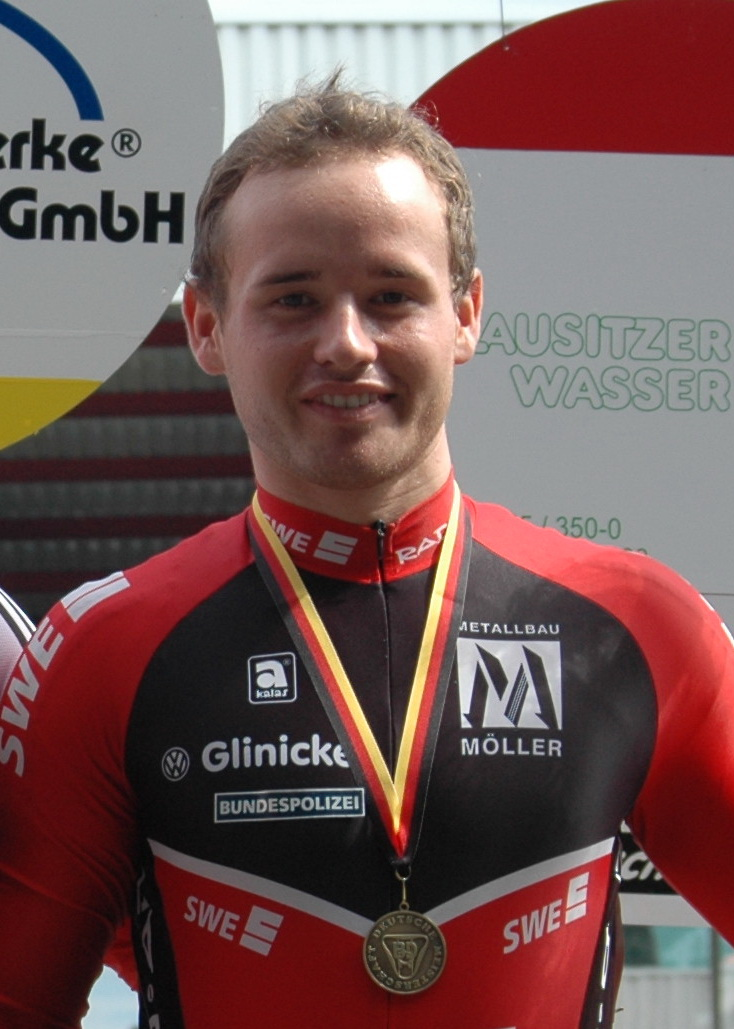
- Seidenbecher in 2006

Personal information
- Born: 6 November 1984 (age 41)

Cycling career
- Sport: Cycling
- Discipline: Track cycling
- Role: Rider
- Rider type: Sprinter

Michael Seidenbecher (born 6 November 1984) is a German track cyclist, riding for the national team. He competed at the 2006, 2007, 2008 and 2010 UCI Track Cycling World Championships.
