= Esow Alben =

Indian track cyclist

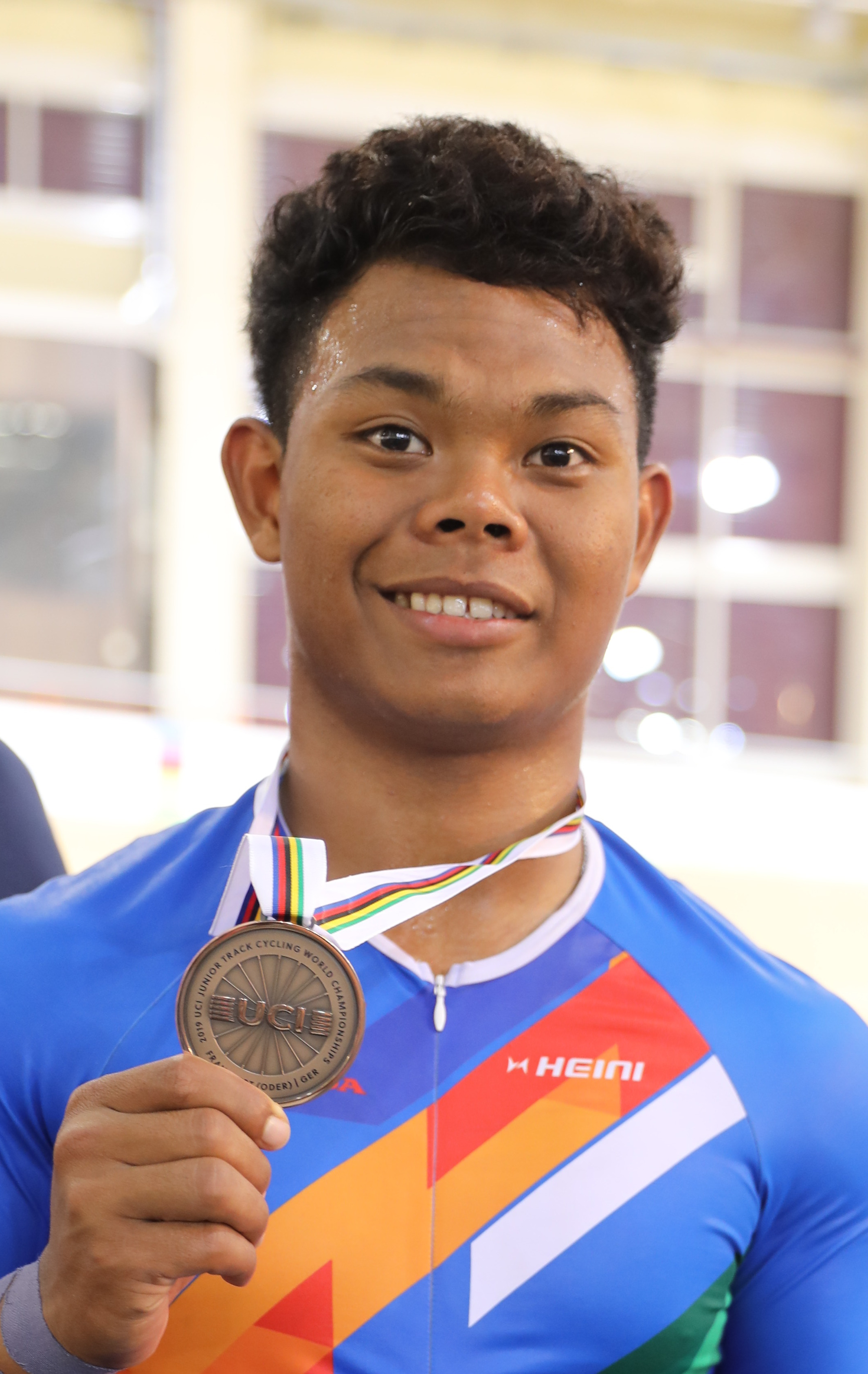

Personal information
- Nationality: Indian
- Born: 10 March 2001 (age 25) Kinyuka, Nicobar, Andaman and Nicobar Islands, India
- Weight: 80.0 kg (176 lb)

Sport
- Country: India
- Sport: Track cycling
- Event: Sprint
Medal record
Men's track cycling
Representing India
Asian Championships
| Bronze medal – third place | 2022 New Delhi | Team sprint |
Junior World Championships
| Gold medal – first place | 2019 Frankfurt | Team sprint |
| Silver medal – second place | 2018 Aigle | Individual keirin |
| Silver medal – second place | 2019 Frankfurt | Individual sprint |
| Bronze medal – third place | 2019 Frankfurt | Individual keirin |

Esow Alben is an Indian track cyclist. He is the first Indian to win a world cycling medal after winning silver in the men's keirin at the 2018 UCI Junior Track Cycling World Championships in Aigle, Switzerland.

== Early life ==
Esow Alben was born 10 March 2001 in Kinyuka, Nicobar, Andaman and Nicobar Islands, India. His father, Alban Didus, was a keen cyclist who competed in the Police Games by virtue of his employment in the police and fire services. His mum, Lelly Alban, was a national-level kabaddi player who participated at the 1984 national championships in Chandigarh. He grew up in Port Blair, Andaman and Nicobar Islands where he completed his schooling at the Government Model School.

In 2004, Alben and his family survived the Indian Ocean earthquake and tsunami.

Alben played a number of sports as a child. He took rowing lessons and also practised football and athletics. In 2014, he took up cycling after being inspired by his friends and the feeling of overtaking another cyclist. He had previously cycled to his rowing sessions.

== Cycling career ==
Alben first took part in a Union Cycliste Internationale (UCI) event in 2018 when he contested the 2018 UCI Junior Track Cycling World Championships in Aigle, Switzerland. He won a silver medal in the men's keirin to become the first person from India to win a world cycling medal.

The following year, Alben led India to its first cycling gold as part of the men's team in the sprint competition at the 2019 UCI Junior Track Cycling World Championships in Frankfurt an der Oder, Brandenburg, Germany.

== See also ==
- Cycling in India
