= Azizulhasni Awang =

Malaysian track cyclist (born 1988)

Yang Berbahagia Dato' Dr Azizulhasni Awang DB DPMT KMN AMN
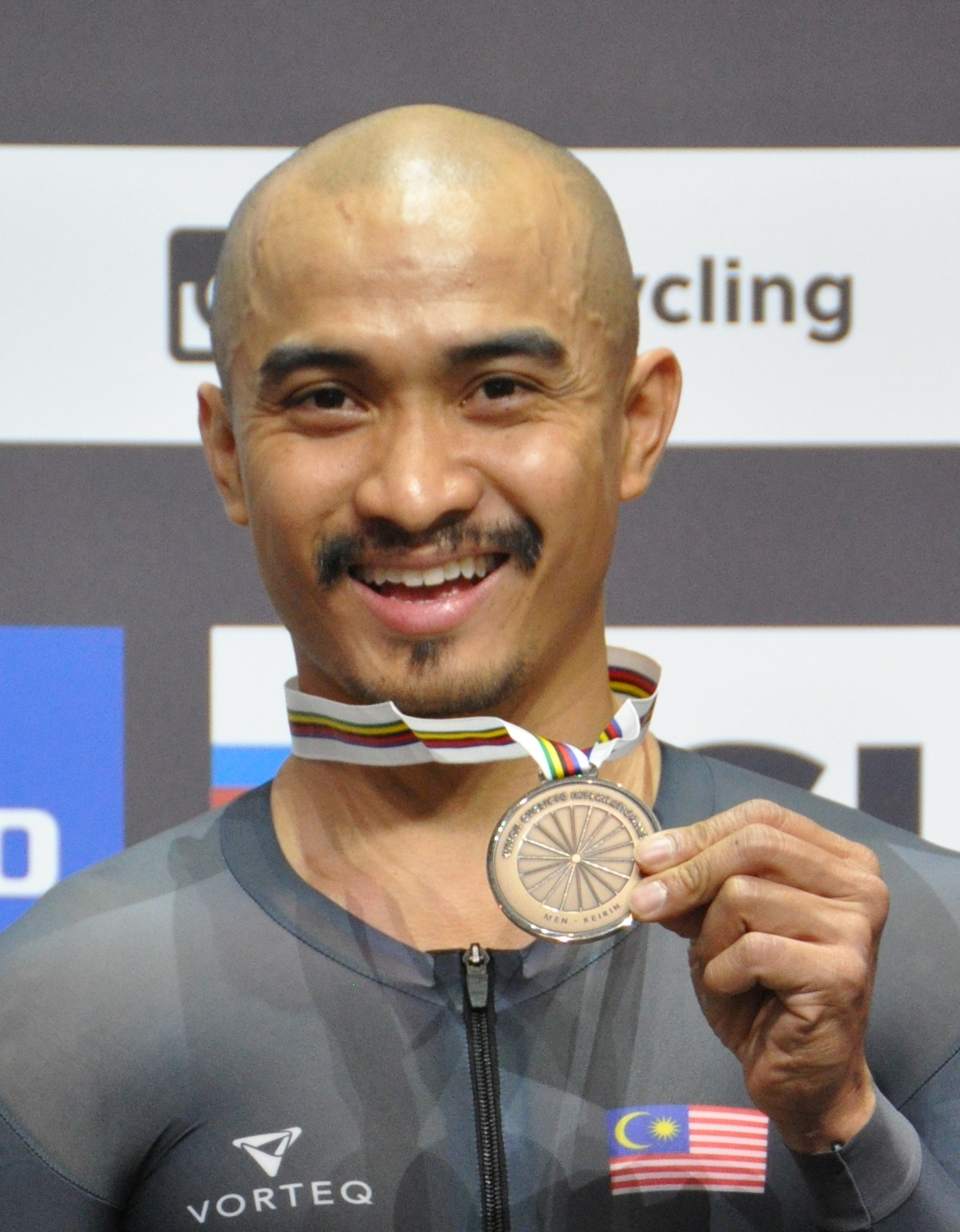
- Azizulhasni in 2020

Personal information
- Full name: Muhammad Azizulhasni bin Awang @ Muda
- Nickname: The Pocket Rocketman
- Born: 5 January 1988 (age 38) Kuala Dungun, Terengganu, Malaysia
- Height: 1.68 m (5 ft 6 in)

Cycling career
- Sport: Cycling
- Discipline: Track
- Role: Rider
- Rider type: Sprinter

Amateur team
- Dungun Cycling Team

Professional team
- 2009: Bike Technologies Australia
Medal record
Representing Malaysia
Event	1st	2nd	3rd
Olympic Games	0	1	1
World Championships	1	2	4
Asian Games	3	1	2
Asian Championships	12	7	6
SEA Games	3	2	0
Commonwealth Games	1	0	2
Total	20	13	15
Men's track cycling
Olympic Games
Silver medal – second place	2020 Tokyo	Keirin
Bronze medal – third place	2016 Rio de Janeiro	Keirin
World Championships
Gold medal – first place	2017 Hong Kong	Keirin
Silver medal – second place	2009 Pruszków	Sprint
Silver medal – second place	2010 Ballerup	Keirin
Bronze medal – third place	2015 Yvelines	Keirin
Bronze medal – third place	2016 London	Keirin
Bronze medal – third place	2020 Berlin	Keirin
Bronze medal – third place	2020 Berlin	Sprint
Asian Games
Gold medal – first place	2010 Guangzhou	Keirin
Gold medal – first place	2018 Jakarta–Palembang	Sprint
Gold medal – first place	2026 Aichi–Nagoya	Keirin
Silver medal – second place	2018 Jakarta–Palembang	Team sprint
Bronze medal – third place	2018 Jakarta–Palembang	Keirin
Bronze medal – third place	2026 Aichi–Nagoya	Sprint
Asian Championships
Gold medal – first place	2007 Bangkok	Keirin
Gold medal – first place	2008 Nara	Sprint
Gold medal – first place	2008 Nara	Keirin
Gold medal – first place	2009 Tenggarong	Sprint
Gold medal – first place	2009 Tenggarong	Team sprint
Gold medal – first place	2014 Astana	Sprint
Gold medal – first place	2015 Nakhon Ratchasima	Keirin
Gold medal – first place	2017 New Delhi	Sprint
Gold medal – first place	2019 Jakarta	Sprint
Gold medal – first place	2020 Jincheon	Sprint
Gold medal – first place	2023 Nilai	Sprint
Gold medal – first place	2023 Nilai	Keirin
Silver medal – second place	2008 Nara	Team sprint
Silver medal – second place	2012 Kuala Lumpur	Sprint
Silver medal – second place	2012 Kuala Lumpur	Keirin
Silver medal – second place	2014 Astana	Keirin
Silver medal – second place	2015 Nakhon Ratchasima	Sprint
Silver medal – second place	2018 Nilai	Sprint
Silver medal – second place	2020 Jincheon	Keirin
Bronze medal – third place	2011 Nakhon Ratchasima	Sprint
Bronze medal – third place	2011 Nakhon Ratchasima	Keirin
Bronze medal – third place	2016 Izu	Sprint
Bronze medal – third place	2016 Izu	Keirin
Bronze medal – third place	2018 Nilai	Keirin
Bronze medal – third place	2019 Jakarta	Team sprint
Commonwealth Games
Gold medal – first place	2026 Glasgow	Keirin
Bronze medal – third place	2010 New Delhi	Team sprint
Bronze medal – third place	2014 Glasgow	Keirin
Southeast Asian Games
Gold medal – first place	2017 Kuala Lumpur	Sprint
Gold medal – first place	2017 Kuala Lumpur	Keirin
Gold medal – first place	2007 Nakhon Ratchasima	Team sprint
Silver medal – second place	2007 Nakhon Ratchasima	1 km time trial
Silver medal – second place	2007 Nakhon Ratchasima	Sprint

Dato' Muhammad Azizulhasni Awang @ Muda (born 5 January 1988) is a Malaysian professional track cyclist and sprinter based in Melbourne, Australia. Nicknamed the "Pocket Rocketman" because of his small stature, he is the first and only Malaysian cyclist to win an Olympic medal and the first Malaysian athlete to compete at five Olympic Games.

Azizulhasni won bronze in the men's keirin at the 2016 Summer Olympics in Rio de Janeiro before improving to silver in the same event at the 2020 Summer Olympics in Tokyo. In 2017, he became Malaysia's first track cycling world champion when he won the men's keirin at the 2017 UCI Track Cycling World Championships in Hong Kong, becoming the first Malaysian cyclist to wear the rainbow jersey.

In 2026, at the age of 38, he won the overall men's keirin title in the UCI Track Cycling World Cup, after winning the Perth and Nilai rounds, and captured his first Commonwealth Games gold medal in the keirin at the 2026 Commonwealth Games in Glasgow.

== Early life and education ==
Azizulhasni was born in Dungun, Terengganu, Malaysia, to Awang Embong and Rokiah Husin. He is the eighth of nine children and was adopted by Mustafa Ngah and Selamiah Yong. He began cycling as a child and was later discovered by his first coach, Rozimi Omar, who encouraged him to concentrate on cycling.

He received his primary education at Sekolah Kebangsaan Batu 48 before attending Sekolah Menengah Kebangsaan Sultan Omar in Dungun. After his PMR examination, he received offers from several schools and eventually transferred to the national sports school at Bukit Jalil to pursue cycling.

Azizulhasni moved to Melbourne, Australia, in 2007 to join the Malaysian track cycling team's overseas training program under Australian coach John Beasley. He subsequently undertook tertiary studies in Australia. The Olympic Council of Malaysia reported in 2024 that he had studied at Deakin University in 2009–2010 and later pursued a Bachelor of Exercise Science at Victoria University. In December 2024, Bernama reported that he was completing a Bachelor of Exercise and Sport Science at Deakin University.

In 2015, Azizulhasni became the first non-Australian athlete to receive a Blue Award from Victoria University.

== Career ==
=== Early international career ===
Azizulhasni represented Malaysia at the 2008 Summer Olympics in Beijing, where he was Malaysia's flag bearer at the opening ceremony. He won his first World Championships medal in 2009, taking silver in the individual sprint in Pruszków, Poland.

He followed this with another World Championships silver medal in the keirin in 2010. He was named Malaysian Sportsman of the Year in both 2009 and 2010.

In February 2011, Azizulhasni was involved in a major crash during the keirin final at a UCI Track Cycling World Cup event in Manchester. Despite completing the race, a 20 cm wooden splinter had pierced his leg and required surgical removal.

=== Olympic medals and world title ===
At the 2016 Summer Olympics in Rio de Janeiro, Azizulhasni won bronze in the men's keirin, becoming the first Malaysian cyclist to win an Olympic medal.

In April 2017, he won the men's keirin at the 2017 UCI Track Cycling World Championships in Hong Kong. The victory made him Malaysia's first track cycling world champion and earned him the rainbow jersey.

At the 2017 Southeast Asian Games in Kuala Lumpur, he won gold in both the sprint and keirin. His sprint victory delivered Malaysia's 111th gold medal of the Games.

At the 2018 Asian Games in Jakarta and Palembang, Azizulhasni won gold in the individual sprint, silver in the team sprint and bronze in the keirin.

At the 2020 Summer Olympics in Tokyo, held in 2021, he won silver in the men's keirin, improving on his bronze medal from Rio.

=== Heart surgery and return ===
In April 2022, Azizulhasni underwent corrective open-heart surgery at Epworth Richmond Hospital in Melbourne after being diagnosed with anomalous aortic origin of the right coronary artery (AAORCA).

He subsequently returned to international competition. At the 2023 Asian Track Cycling Championships at the National Velodrome in Nilai, he won both the men's sprint and keirin titles. The keirin victory was his 12th Asian Championships gold medal.

Azizulhasni was due to compete at the postponed 2022 Asian Games in Hangzhou in September 2023, but withdrew shortly before the Games after sustaining injuries in a training accident.

=== Paris 2024 ===
At the 2024 Summer Olympics in Paris, Azizulhasni became the first Malaysian athlete to compete at five Olympic Games.

During qualification for the men's sprint, he set a Malaysian national record of 9.402 seconds for the flying 200 metres. He later exited the sprint competition before the quarter-finals.

In the men's keirin, Azizulhasni was disqualified during the first round for passing the derny before it had left the track. Malaysia appealed the decision, but the chief commissaire and the UCI upheld the disqualification.

=== 2026 season ===
Azizulhasni returned to top-level international competition in 2026.

At the opening round of the UCI Track Cycling World Cup in Perth, Australia, he won gold in the men's keirin and bronze in the individual sprint.

At the final World Cup round in Nilai in April, he again won the men's keirin, defeating reigning world champion Harrie Lavreysen, and took another bronze medal in the sprint. His two keirin victories gave him 1,600 points and the overall 2026 UCI Track World Cup keirin title, 15 years after his previous overall World Cup keirin title.

At the 2026 Commonwealth Games in Glasgow, Azizulhasni won the men's keirin gold medal, his first Commonwealth Games title and the final Commonwealth Games appearance of his career. He was eliminated in the quarter-finals of the men's sprint and later volunteered to compete in the 1,000-metre time trial, where he finished 10th.

At the 2026 Asian Games in Aichi-Nagoya, Azizulhasni returned to the Asian Games for the first time since 2018. On 30 September, he recorded 9.467 seconds in men's sprint qualifying, the third-fastest time overall, before defeating India's David Beckham Elkatohchoongo and Kazakhstan's Kirill Kurdidi to advance to the quarter-finals against Japan's Kanata Takahashi.

== Personal life ==
Azizulhasni married Athiah Ilyana Abd Samat on 30 January 2010. The couple are Australian permanent residents and live in Melbourne. They have four daughters.

== Major results ==
Track Cycling World Ranking

- 2008–09 – 1st, Keirin
- 2010–11 – 1st, Keirin

World Championships

- 2009 – Sprint
- 2010 – Keirin
- 2015 – Keirin
- 2016 – Keirin
- 2017 – Keirin
- 2020 – Keirin
- 2020 – Sprint

UCI Track World Cup

- 2026 Perth – Keirin
- 2026 Perth – Sprint
- 2026 Nilai – Keirin
- 2026 Nilai – Sprint
- 2026 – Overall keirin champion

Asian Games

- 2010 – Keirin
- 2018 – Sprint
- 2018 – Team sprint
- 2018 – Keirin

Commonwealth Games

- 2010 – Team sprint
- 2014 – Keirin
- 2026 – Keirin

Olympic Games

- 2016 – Keirin
- 2020 – Keirin

== Awards and achievements ==
- Malaysian Sportsman of the Year: 2009, 2010
- Sportswriters Association of Malaysia (SAM)-100Plus Best Athlete Award: 2009, 2017

== Honours ==
=== Honours of Malaysia ===
- Malaysia
  - Recipient of the Order of Merit (DB) (2026)
  - Officer of the Order of the Defender of the Realm (KMN) (2017)
  - Member of the Order of the Defender of the Realm (AMN) (2016)
- Terengganu
  - Knight Commander of the Order of the Crown of Terengganu (DPMT) – Dato' (2021)

== See also ==
- List of World Championship medalists in men's keirin
- List of Malaysian records in track cycling

Olympic Games
Preceded by Bryan Nickson Lomas	Flagbearer for Malaysia; Beijing 2008	Succeeded by Pandelela Rinong
