= Jai Angsuthasawit =

Australian-Thai track cyclist (born 1995)

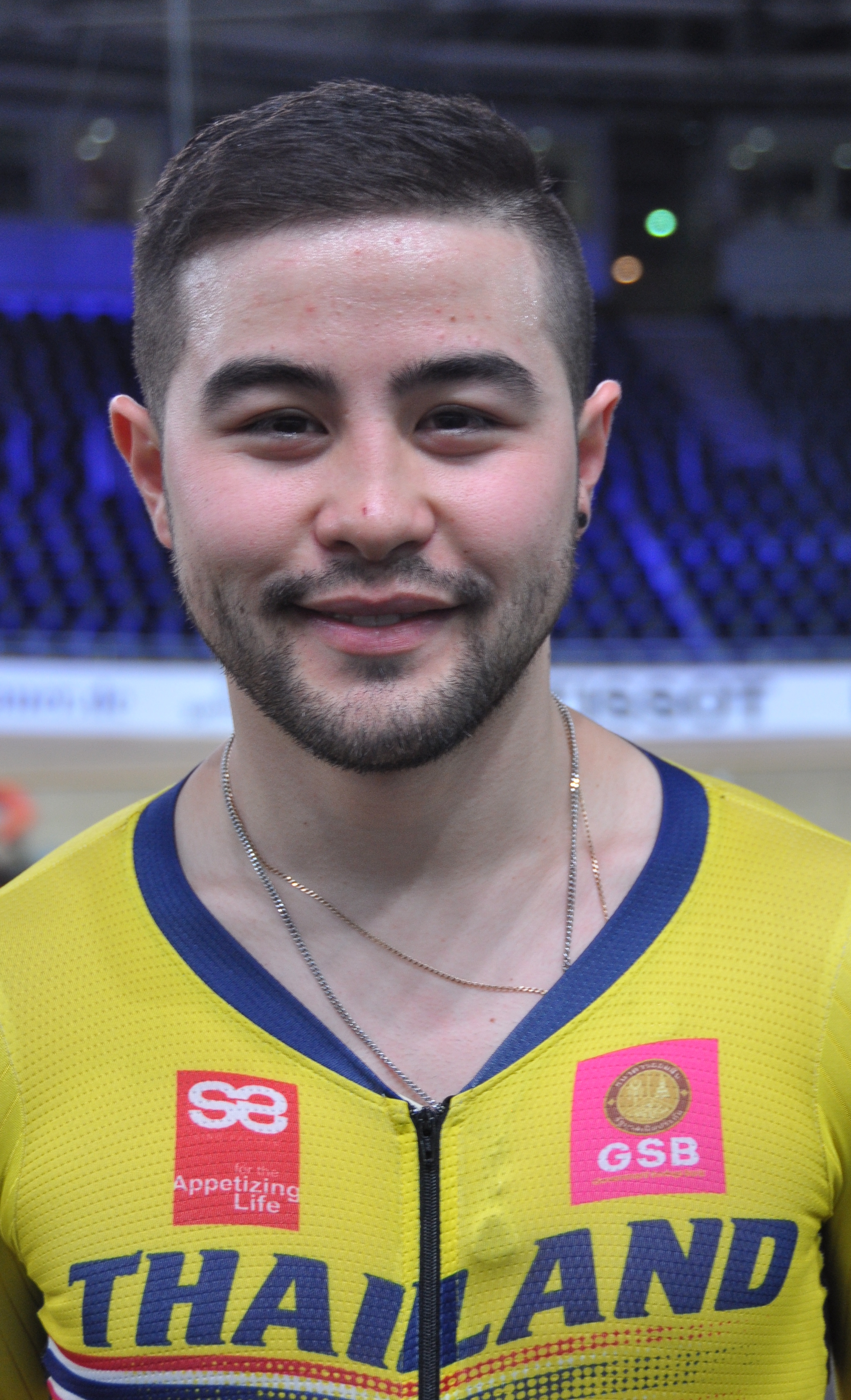
- Angsuthasawit in 2020

Personal information
- Born: 16 February 1995 (age 31) Adelaide, Australia

Cycling career
- Sport: Cycling
- Discipline: Track
- Role: Rider
- Rider type: Sprinter
Medal record
Men's track cycling
Representing Thailand
Asian Games
Gold medal – first place	2018 Jakarta-Palembang	Keirin

Jai Angsuthasawit (Thai: จาย อังค์สุธาสาวิทย์, RTGS: Chai Angsuthasawit; born 16 February 1995) is an Australian-Thai track cyclist, who specializes in sprinting events. He won the overall title in the keirin at the 2019–20 UCI Track Cycling World Cup as well as the keirin at the 2018 Asian Games.
