= Jean Spies =

South African cyclist

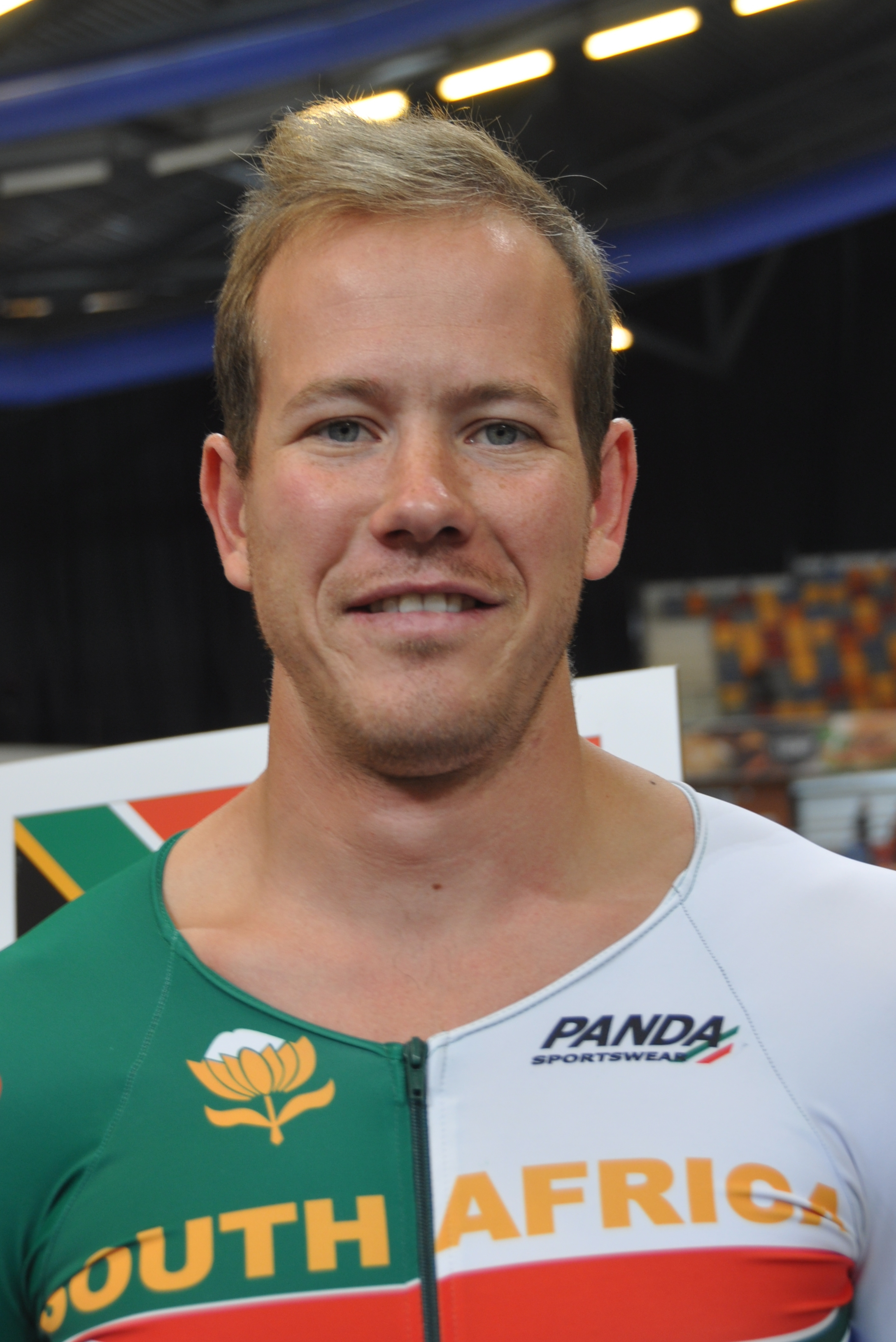
- Jean Spies (2018)

Personal information
- Born: 27 November 1989 (age 36)

Cycling career
- Sport: Cycling
- Role: Rider

Jean Spies (born 27 November 1989) is a South African professional racing cyclist. He rode in the men's scratch event at the 2016 UCI Track Cycling World Championships.

In June 2021, he qualified to represent South Africa at the 2020 Summer Olympics.
