= Xu Chao =

Chinese cyclist (1994–2024)

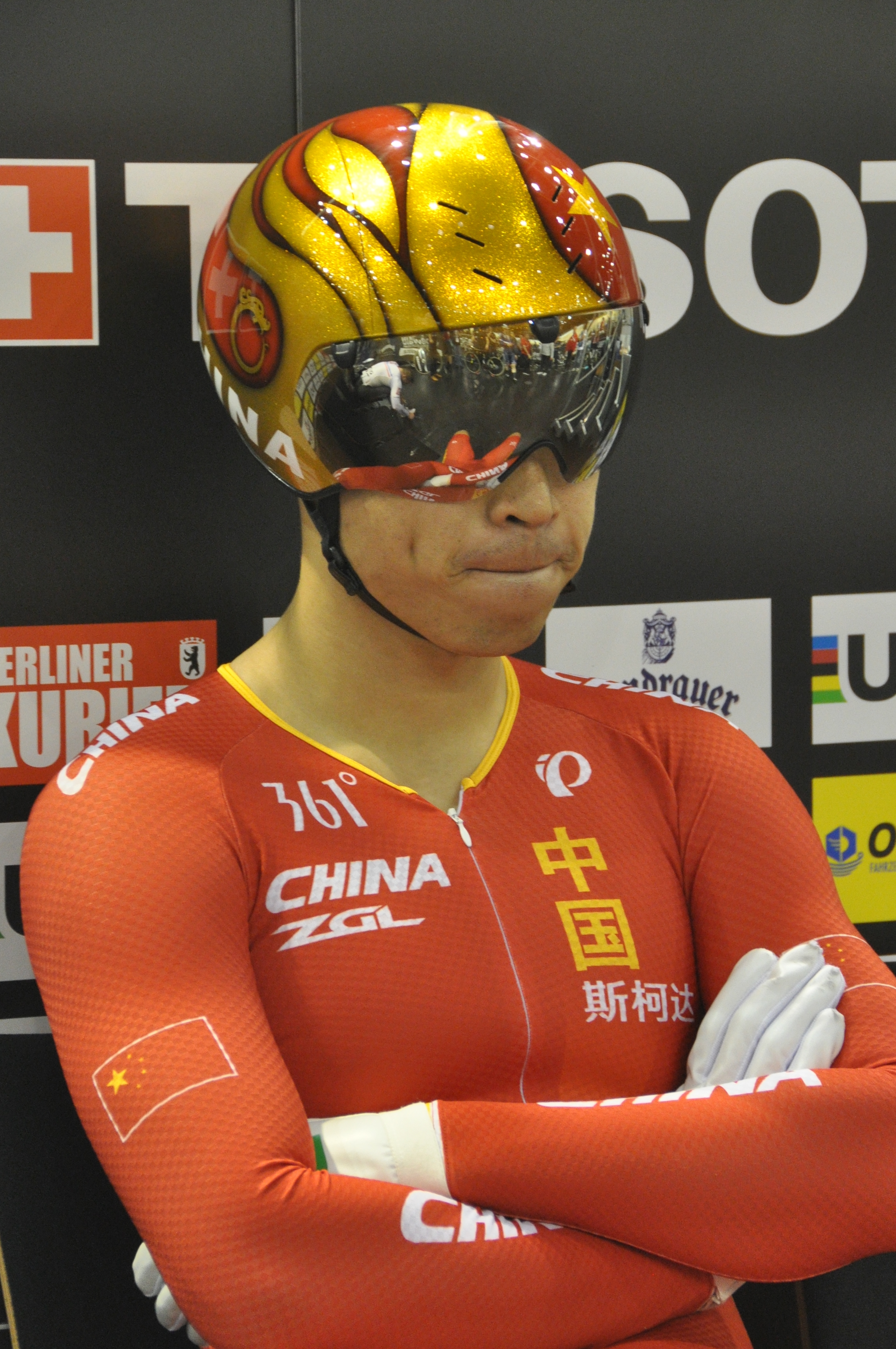
- Xu in 2018

Personal information
- Born: 5 November 1994 Shanghai, China
- Died: 10 November 2024 (aged 30) Hainan, China

Cycling career
- Sport: Cycling
- Role: Rider
Medal record
Representing China
Men's track cycling
Asian Games
| Gold medal – first place | 2018 Jakarta-Palembang | Team sprint |
| Silver medal – second place | 2014 Incheon | Team sprint |
Asian Championships
| Silver medal – second place | 2014 Astana | Team sprint |
| Silver medal – second place | 2019 Jakarta | Sprint |
| Silver medal – second place | 2019 Jakarta | Team sprint |

Xu Chao (Chinese: 徐超; pinyin: Xú Chāo, 5 November 1994 – 10 November 2024) was a Chinese professional racing cyclist. He rode at the 2015 UCI Track Cycling World Championships. He also competed at the 2014 Asian Games and won a silver medal in the team sprint. Xu died on 10 November 2024, at the age of 30.
