= Yuta Wakimoto =

Japanese cyclist

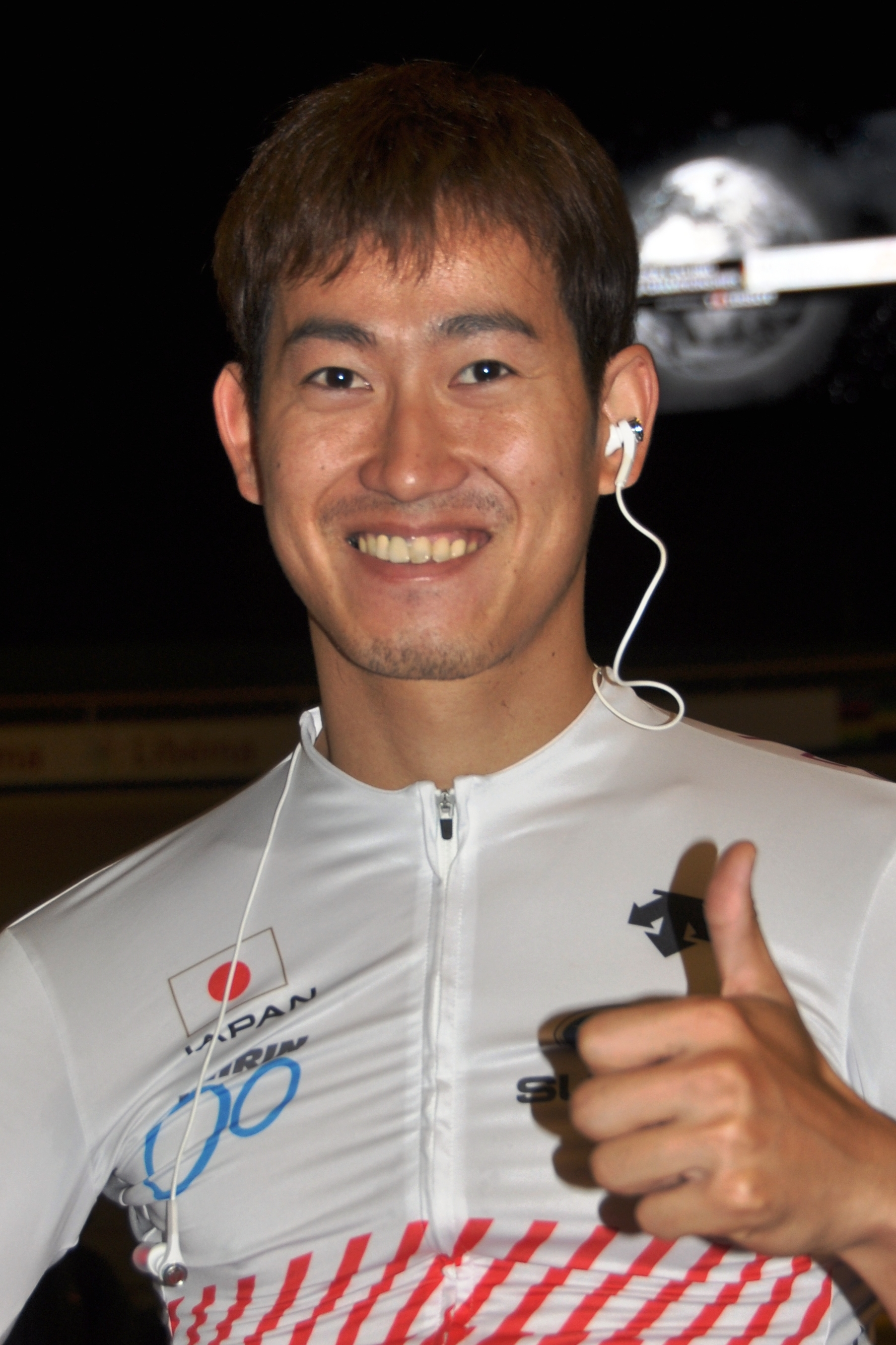
- Wakimoto in 2018

Personal information
- Born: 21 March 1989 (age 37) Fukui, Japan
- Height: 1.81 m (5 ft 11 in)
- Weight: 74 kg (163 lb)

Cycling career
- Sport: Cycling
- Current team: Team Bridgestone Cycling
- Disciplines: Track; Road
- Role: Rider
- Rider type: Keirin (track)

Professional team
- 2021–: Team Bridgestone Cycling
Medal record
Men's track cycling
Representing Japan
World Championships
| Silver medal – second place | 2020 Berlin | Keirin |
Asian Championships
| Gold medal – first place | 2014 Astana | Keirin |
| Gold medal – first place | 2017 New Delhi | Keirin |
| Gold medal – first place | 2019 Jakarta | Keirin |
| Gold medal – first place | 2020 Jincheon | Keirin |
| Silver medal – second place | 2014 Astana | 1 km time trial |
| Bronze medal – third place | 2017 New Delhi | Sprint |

Yuta Wakimoto (脇本 雄太, Wakimoto Yūta; born 21 March 1989) is a Japanese track and road cyclist, who currently rides for UCI Continental team Team Bridgestone Cycling. He competed in the keirin event at the 2014 UCI Track Cycling World Championships. He is also a professional keirin cyclist.

He has qualified to represent Japan at the 2020 Summer Olympics.
