= Sergey Ponomaryov =

Kazakhstani cyclist (born 1998)

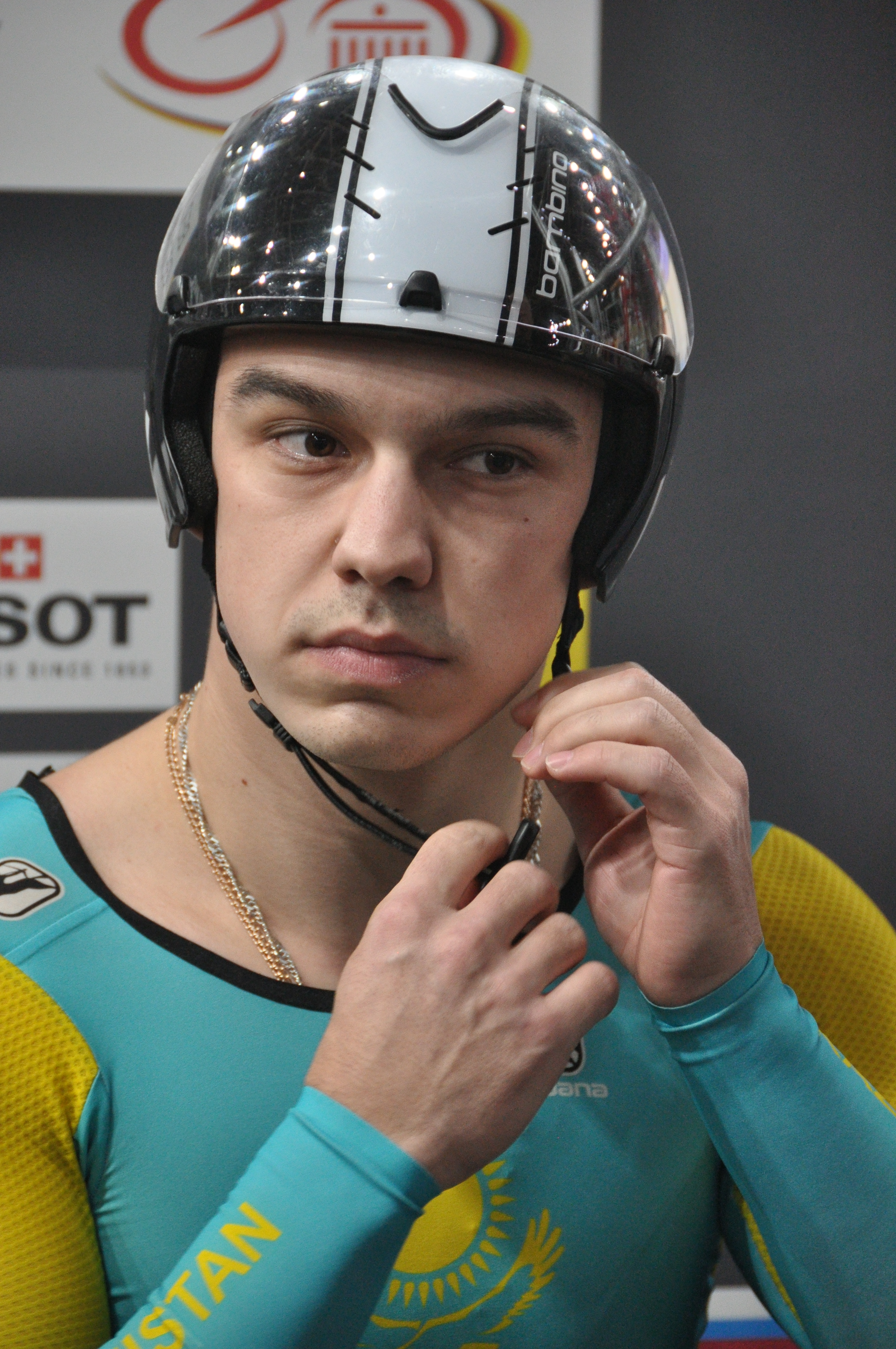
- Ponomaryov at the 2020 UCI Track Cycling World Championships

Personal information
- Born: 15 April 1998 (age 28)

Cycling career
- Sport: Cycling
- Discipline: Track
- Role: Rider
- Rider type: Sprinter
Medal record
Men's track cycling
Representing Kazakhstan
Asian Championships
Gold medal – first place	2019 Jakarta	1 km time trial
Bronze medal – third place	2022 New Delhi	Keirin

Sergey Ponomaryov (born 15 April 1998) is a Kazakhstani cyclist. He competed in the men's sprint event at the 2020 Summer Olympics. He also competed in three events at the 2020 UCI Track Cycling World Championships and in two events at the 2019 UCI Track Cycling World Championships.
