= Muhammad Shah Firdaus Sahrom =

Malaysian cyclist (born 1995)

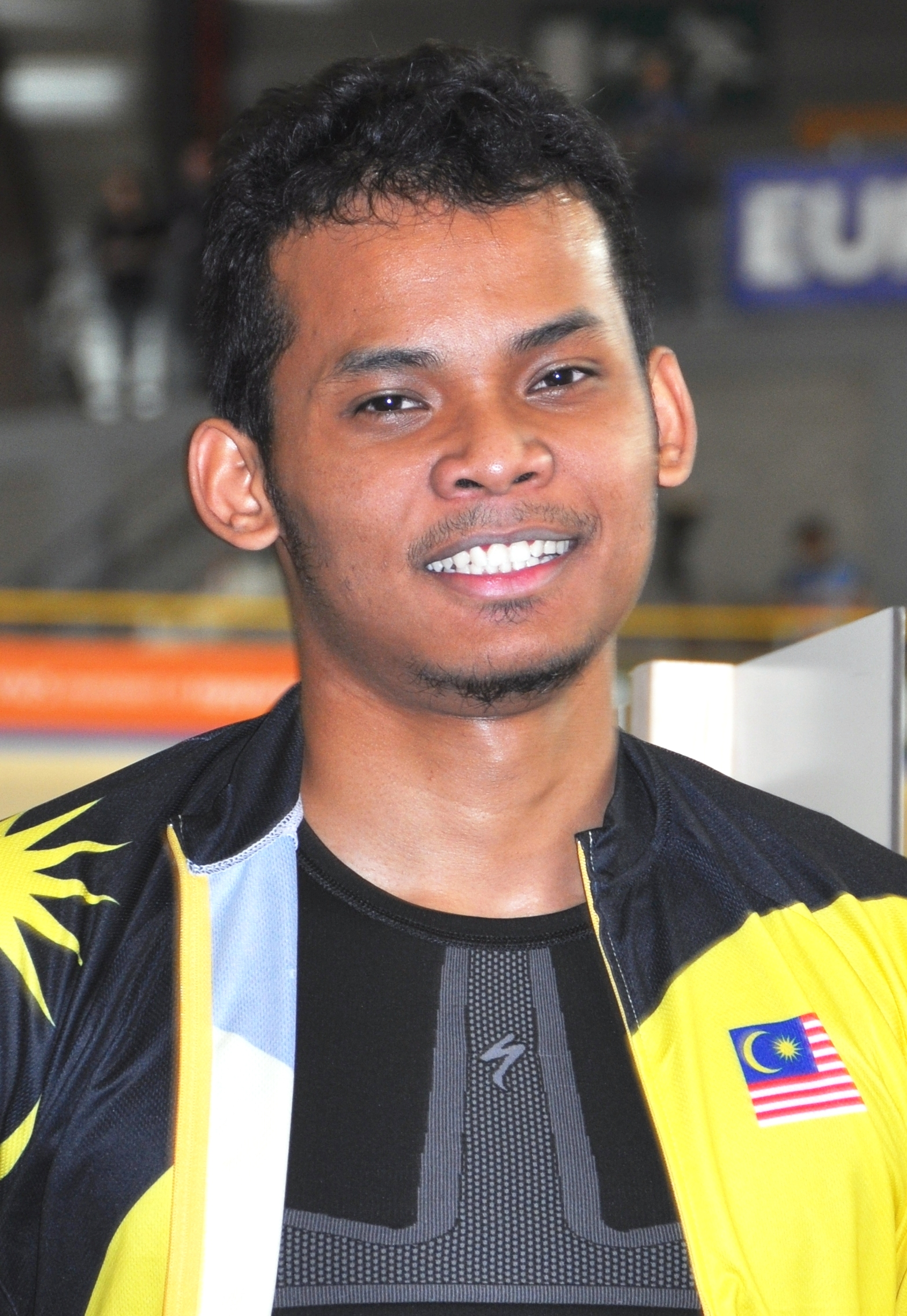

Personal information
- Full name: Muhammad Shah Firdaus bin Sahrom
- Born: 26 November 1995 (age 30) Muar, Johor, Malaysia

Cycling career
- Sport: Cycling
- Discipline: Track
- Role: Rider
- Rider type: Sprinter
Medal record
Representing Malaysia
Men's track cycling
Event	1st	2nd	3rd
Commonwealth Games	0	0	1
Asian Games	0	1	2
Asian Championships	0	4	6
SEA Games	0	1	0
Total	0	6	9
Asian Games
Silver medal – second place	2018 Jakarta-Palembang	Team sprint
Bronze medal – third place	2022 Hangzhou	Sprint
Bronze medal – third place	2022 Hangzhou	Keirin
Commonwealth Games
Bronze medal – third place	2022 Birmingham	Keirin
Asian Championships
Silver medal – second place	2019 Jakarta	Keirin
Silver medal – second place	2022 New Delhi	Keirin
Silver medal – second place	2022 New Delhi	Team Sprint
Silver medal – second place	2025 Nilai	Keirin
Bronze medal – third place	2017 New Delhi	Keirin
Bronze medal – third place	2019 Jakarta	Sprint
Bronze medal – third place	2019 Jakarta	Team sprint
Bronze medal – third place	2023 Nilai	Keirin
Bronze medal – third place	2024 New Delhi	Sprint
Bronze medal – third place	2025 Nilai	Sprint
SEA Games
Silver medal – second place	2017 Kuala Lumpur	Sprint

Muhammad Shah Firdaus bin Sahrom (born 26 November 1995) is a Malaysian professional racing cyclist. He participated in both Sprint and Keirin cycling events during the 2020 Tokyo Olympics. He competed at the 2022 Commonwealth Games in the Keirin event where he won a bronze medal and in the sprint event. He competed in the 2024 Paris Olympics, where in the Keirin Final, he finished in sixth place.

== Biography ==
Shah Firdaus was born in Muar, Johor, Malaysia, where he and his family hails from the Kampung Parit Setongkat.

He participated in both Sprint and Keirin cycling events during the 2020 Summer Olympics in Tokyo. He won the 2021 Australian Track National Championship in the keirin event, defeating compatriot Azizulhasni Awang. He competed at the 2022 Commonwealth Games in the Keirin event where he won a bronze medal and in the sprint event.

He also competed in Paris Olympics 2024 and finished at sixth place in the final round of Keirin.

== See also ==
- List of Track Cycling Nations Cup medalists
