= 2008 UCI Track Cycling World Championships – Men's team sprint =

Men's team sprint at the 2008 UCI Track Cycling World Championships
- Venue: Manchester Velodrome, Manchester
- Date: 26 March 2008

The Men's team sprint event of the 2008 UCI Track Cycling World Championships was held on 26 March 2008.

== Results ==
=== Qualifying ===
Rank	Name	Nation	Time	Speed (km/h)	Notes
1	Grégory Baugé; Mickaël Bourgain; Kévin Sireau	France	43.514	62.048	
2	Ross Edgar; Chris Hoy; Jamie Staff	Great Britain	43.910	61.489	
3	Theo Bos; Teun Mulder; Tim Veldt	Netherlands	43.958	61.422	
4	René Enders; Maximilian Levy; Stefan Nimke	Germany	44.257	61.007	
5	Daniel Ellis; Mark French; Ben Kersten	Australia	44.615	60.517	
6	Sergey Borisov; Sergey Kucherov; Sergey Ruban	Russia	44.898	60.136	
7	Yong Feng; Wen Hao Li; Lei Zhang	China	45.004	59.994	
8	Tsubasa Kitatsuru; Kiyofumi Nagai; Kazunari Watanabe	Japan	45.031	59.958	
9	Yevhen Bolibrukh; Yuriy Tsyupyk; Andriy Vynokurov	Ukraine	45.061	59.918	
10	Michael Blatchford; Adam Duvendeck; Giddeon Massie	United States	45.128	59.829	
11	Maciej Bielecki; Kamil Kuczyński; Łukasz Kwiatkowski	Poland	45.164	59.782	
12	Álvaro Alonso Rubio; Hodei Mazquiarán Uría; Salvador Meliá Mangriñan	Spain	45.276	59.634	
13	Tomáš Bábek; Adam Ptáčník; Denis Špička	Czech Republic	45.679	59.108	
14	Athanasios Mantzouranis; Christos Volikakis; Panagiotis Voukelatos	Greece	45.699	59.082	
15	Azizulhasni Awang; Mohd Edrus Yunus; Josiah Ng	Malaysia	45.708	59.070	

=== Finals ===
Rank	Name	Nation	Time	Speed (km/h)	Notes
Race for bronze
1	Theo Bos; Teun Mulder; Tim Veldt	Netherlands	43.718	61.759	
2	René Enders; Maximilian Levy; Stefan Nimke	Germany	44.275	60.982	
Race for gold
1	Grégory Baugé; Arnaud Tournant; Kévin Sireau	France	43.271	62.397	
2	Ross Edgar; Chris Hoy; Jamie Staff	Great Britain	43.777	61.676	
