= 2007 UCI Track Cycling World Championships – Men's team sprint =

Men's team sprint at the 2007 UCI Track Cycling World Championships
- Venue: Palma Arena
- Location: Palma de Mallorca, Spain
- Date: 29 March 2007
- Winning time: 43.830

Medalists
gold medal	Grégory Baugé; Mickaël Bourgain; Arnaud Tournant	France
silver medal	Ross Edgar; Chris Hoy; Craig MacLean	Great Britain
bronze medal	Robert Förstemann; Maximilian Levy; Stefan Nimke	Germany

The men's team sprint was one of the 10 men's events at the 2007 UCI Track World Championship, held in Palma de Mallorca, Spain.

Fourteen teams of 3 cyclists each participated in the contest. After the qualifying, the fastest 2 teams raced for gold, and 3rd and 4th teams raced for bronze.

The qualifying and the finals were held on the evening session on 29 March.

== Qualifying ==
Rank	Team	Lap 1	Lap 2	Time	Speed (km/h)	Q
Rank	Team	Lap 1	Lap 1–2	Lap 2–3	Speed (km/h)	Q
1	Great Britain	17.856 (2)	30.466 (2)	43.917	61.479	QF
	Ross Edgar; Chris Hoy; Craig MacLean		12.880 (1)	13.451 (2)		
2	France	17.438 (1)	30.369 (1)	44.036	61.313	QF
	Grégory Baugé; Mickaël Bourgain; Arnaud Tournant		12.931 (3)	13.667 (5)		
3	Germany	17.702 (3)	30.684 (3)	44.138	61.171	QB
	Robert Förstemann; Maximilian Levy; Stefan Nimke		12.982 (4)	13.454 (3)		
4	Netherlands	18.070 (8)	30.984 (5)	44.456	60.734	QB
	Theo Bos; Teun Mulder; Tim Veldt		12.914 (2)	13.472 (4)		
5	Australia	18.023 (7)	31.155 (6)	44.589	60.553	
	Ryan Bayley; Mark French; Shane Perkins		13.132 (6)	13.434 (1)		
6	Spain	17.810 (4)	30.935 (4)	44.740	60.348	
	Álvaro Alonso Rubio; Ruben Donet Gregori; Salvador Meliá Mangriñan		13.125 (5)	13.805 (6)		
7	Japan	18.195 (9)	31.560 (8)	45.451	59.404	
	Masaki Inoue; Kazuya Narita; Kazunari Watanabe		13.365 (8)	13.891 (9)		
8	China	18.015 (6)	31.311 (7)	45.487	59.357	
	Feng Yong; Lin Feng; Zhang Lei		13.296 (7)	14.176 (11)		
9	Poland	18.399 (11)	31.922 (10)	45.756	59.008	
	Maciej Bielecki; Łukasz Kwiatkowski; Damian Zieliński		13.523 (9)	13.834 (7)		
10	Russia	18.274 (10)	31.823 (9)	46.121	58.542	
	Sergey Borisov; Denis Dmitriev; Sergey Polynskiy		13.552 (10)	14.298 (12)		
11	Ukraine	18.611 (13)	32.208 (12)	46.196	58.446	
	Yevgen Bolibrukh; Yuriy Tsyupyk; Andriy Vynokurov		13.597 (12)	13.988 (10)		
12	Czech Republic	18.584 (12)	32.345 (13)	46.235	58.397	
	Tomáš Bábek; Adam Ptáčník; Ivan Vrba		14.256 (14)	13.890 (8)		
13	Greece	17.877 (5)	32.133 (11)	46.517	58.043	
	Athanasios Mantzouranis; Vasileios Reppas; Panagiotis Voukelatos		14.256 (14)	14.384 (13)		
14	Malaysia	19.194 (14)	32.761 (14)	47.268	57.121	
	Azizulhasni Awang; Josiah Ng Onn Lam; Mohd Rizal Tisin		13.567 (11)	14.507 (14)		

== Finals ==
Rank	Team	Lap 1	Lap 2	Time	Speed (km/h)
Rank	Team	Lap 1	Lap 1–2	Lap 2–3	Speed (km/h)
Gold medal race
	France	17.304 (1)	30.214 (1)	43.830	61.601
	Grégory Baugé; Mickaël Bourgain; Arnaud Tournant		12.910 (1)	13.616 (2)	
	Great Britain	17.594 (2)	30.523 (2)	43.832	61.598
	Ross Edgar; Chris Hoy; Craig MacLean		12.935 (2)	13.303 (1)	
Bronze medal race
	Germany	17.728 (1)	30.840 (2)	44.240	61.030
	Robert Förstemann; Maximilian Levy; Stefan Nimke		13.112 (2)	13.400 (2)	
4	Netherlands	18.026 (2)	30.838 (1)	44.286	60.967
	Theo Bos; Teun Mulder; Tim Veldt		12.812 (1)	13.448 (1)	
