= 2012 UCI Track Cycling World Championships – Men's team sprint =

Rainbow jersey

The men's team sprint at the 2012 UCI Track Cycling World Championships was held on 4 April. 17 nations of 3 cyclists each participated in the contest. After the qualifying, the fastest two teams raced for gold, and 3rd and 4th teams raced for bronze.

== Medalists ==
Gold	Australia; Shane Perkins; Scott Sunderland; Matthew Glaetzer
Silver	France; Grégory Bauge; Kévin Sireau; Michaël D'Almeida
Bronze	New Zealand; Ethan Mitchell; Sam Webster; Edward Dawkins

== Results ==
=== Qualifying ===
The qualifying was held at 19:35.

Rank	Name	Nation	Time	Notes
1	Grégory Baugé; Michaël D'Almeida; Kévin Sireau	France	43.247	Q
2	Matthew Glaetzer; Shane Perkins; Scott Sunderland	Australia	43.512	Q
3	Edward Dawkins; Ethan Mitchell; Sam Webster	New Zealand	43.742	Q
4	Kazuki Amagai; Seiichiro Nakagawa; Kazunari Watanabe	Japan	44.039	Q
5	Cheng Changsong; Zhang Lei; Zhang Miao	China	44.049	
6	Denis Dmitriev; Sergey Borisov; Sergei Kucherov	Russia	44.215	
7	Hugo Haak; Teun Mulder; Roy van den Berg	Netherlands	44.282	
8	Hersony Canelón; César Marcano; Ángel Pulgar	Venezuela	44.399	
9	Maciej Bielecki; Kamil Kuczyński; Damian Zieliński	Poland	44.819	
10	Filip Ditzel; Adam Ptáčník; Denis Špička	Czech Republic	45.179	
11	Hugo Barrette; Travis Smith; Joseph Veloce	Canada	45.192	
12	Muhd Arfy Qhairant Amran; Muhammad Edrus Md Yunos; Josiah Ng Onn Lam	Malaysia	45.529	
13	Amarjeet Singh; Amrit Singh; Bikram Singh	India	51.042	
14	René Enders; Maximilian Levy; Stefan Nimke	Germany	REL	
15	Philip Hindes; Chris Hoy; Jason Kenny	United Kingdom	REL	
16	Michael Blatchford; Kevin Mansker; Jimmy Watkins	United States	REL	
17	Christos Tserentzoulias; Christos Volikakis; Zafeiris Volikakis	Greece	REL	

=== Finals ===
The finals were held at 21:10.

==== Small final ====
Rank	Name	Nation	Time	Notes
3rd place, bronze medalist(s)	Ethan Mitchell; Sam Webster; Edward Dawkins	New Zealand	43.812	
4	Kazuki Amagai; Kazunari Watanabe; Seiichiro Nakagawa	Japan	43.896	

==== Final ====
Rank	Name	Nation	Time	Notes
1st place, gold medalist(s)	Shane Perkins; Scott Sunderland; Matthew Glaetzer	Australia	43.266	
2nd place, silver medalist(s)	Grégory Bauge; Kévin Sireau; Michaël D'Almeida	France	43.267	
