= Cycling at the 2014 Asian Games – Men's team sprint =

Cycling Competition

Men's team sprint at the 2014 Asian Games
- Venue: Incheon International Velodrome
- Date: 20 September 2014
- Competitors: 27 from 9 nations

Medalists
gold medal	South Korea; Son Je-yong, Kang Dong-jin, Im Chae-bin
silver medal	China; Hu Ke, Bao Saifei, Xu Chao
bronze medal	Japan; Tomoyuki Kawabata, Kazunari Watanabe, Seiichiro Nakagawa

The men's team sprint competition at the 2014 Asian Games was held on 20 September at the Incheon International Velodrome.

== Schedule ==
All times are Korea Standard Time (UTC+09:00)

Date	Time	Event
Saturday, 20 September 2014	16:15	Qualifying
Saturday, 20 September 2014	18:47	Finals

== Results ==
=== Qualifying ===
Rank	Team	Time
1	South Korea (KOR); Son Je-yong; Kang Dong-jin; Im Chae-bin	59.181
2	China (CHN); Hu Ke; Bao Saifei; Xu Chao	59.957
3	Japan (JPN); Tomoyuki Kawabata; Kazunari Watanabe; Seiichiro Nakagawa	1:00.106
4	Iran (IRI); Farzin Arab; Hassan Ali Varposhti; Mahmoud Parash	1:01.814
5	Malaysia (MAS); Azizulhasni Awang; Mohd Edrus Yunus; Josiah Ng	1:02.077
6	Thailand (THA); Worayut Kapunya; Satjakul Sianglam; Thanawut Sanikwathi	1:03.853
7	India (IND); Alan Baby; Amarjeet Singh Nagi; Amrit Singh	1:04.644
8	Hong Kong (HKG); Law Kwun Wa; Mow Ching Yin; Ho Burr	1:05.636
9	Kuwait (KUW); Ali Moslim; Abdulhadi Al-Ajmi; Othman Al-Akari	1:18.211

=== Finals ===
==== Bronze ====
Rank	Team	Time
3rd place, bronze medalist(s)	Japan (JPN); Tomoyuki Kawabata; Kazunari Watanabe; Seiichiro Nakagawa	1:00.436
4	Iran (IRI); Farzin Arab; Hassan Ali Varposhti; Mahmoud Parash	1:01.523

==== Gold ====
Rank	Team	Time
1st place, gold medalist(s)	South Korea (KOR); Son Je-yong; Kang Dong-jin; Im Chae-bin	59.616
2nd place, silver medalist(s)	China (CHN); Hu Ke; Bao Saifei; Xu Chao	59.960
