= Cycling at the 2014 Asian Games – Men's sprint =

Men's sprint at the 2014 Asian Games
- Venue: Incheon International Velodrome
- Date: 22–24 September 2014
- Competitors: 21 from 12 nations

Medalists
gold medal	Seiichiro Nakagawa	Japan
silver medal	Tomoyuki Kawabata	Japan
bronze medal	Bao Saifei	China

The men's sprint competition at the 2014 Asian Games was held from 22 to 24 September at the Incheon International Velodrome.

== Schedule ==
All times are Korea Standard Time (UTC+09:00)

Date	Time	Event
Monday, 22 September 2014	10:00	Qualifying
Monday, 22 September 2014	11:10	1/16 finals
Monday, 22 September 2014	11:57	1/16 final repechages
Monday, 22 September 2014	16:24	1/8 finals
Monday, 22 September 2014	17:24	1/8 final repechages
Monday, 22 September 2014	17:55	Race for 9th–12th places
Tuesday, 23 September 2014	16:00	Quarterfinals
Tuesday, 23 September 2014	17:35	Race for 5th–8th places
Wednesday, 24 September 2014	16:20	Semifinals
Wednesday, 24 September 2014	17:56	Finals

== Records ==
Prior to this competition, the existing world, Asian and Games records were as follows.

World Record	François Pervis (FRA)	9.347	Aguascalientes, Mexico	6 December 2013
Asian Record	Seiichiro Nakagawa (JPN)	9.702	Aguascalientes, Mexico	19 January 2013
Games Record	Zhang Lei (CHN)	10.140	Guangzhou, China	14 November 2010

== Results ==
Legend

- DNS — Did not start
- REL — Relegated

=== Qualifying ===
Rank	Athlete	Time	Notes
1	Seiichiro Nakagawa (JPN)	9.942	GR
2	Azizulhasni Awang (MAS)	10.062	
3	Tomoyuki Kawabata (JPN)	10.065	
4	Im Chae-bin (KOR)	10.066	
5	Bao Saifei (CHN)	10.128	
6	Xu Chao (CHN)	10.131	
7	Mohammad Daneshvar (IRI)	10.175	
8	Mohd Edrus Yunus (MAS)	10.185	
9	Choi Lae-seon (KOR)	10.232	
10	Hassan Ali Varposhti (IRI)	10.386	
11	Liao Kuo-lung (TPE)	10.594	
12	Law Kwun Wa (HKG)	10.794	
13	Amarjeet Singh Nagi (IND)	10.917	
14	Amrit Singh (IND)	11.091	
15	Mow Ching Yin (HKG)	11.127	
16	Ahmed Al-Mansoori (UAE)	11.194	
17	Habeeb Al-Shabeeb (KSA)	11.929	
18	Mohammed Al-Mushaykhis (KSA)	12.386	
19	Ali Moslim (KUW)	12.458	
20	Othman Al-Akari (KUW)	12.532	
21	Muhammad Shakeel (PAK)	12.807	

=== 1/16 finals ===
==== Heat 1 ====
Rank	Athlete	Time
1	Seiichiro Nakagawa (JPN)	11.909
2	Mohammed Al-Mushaykhis (KSA)	

==== Heat 2 ====
Rank	Athlete	Time
1	Azizulhasni Awang (MAS)	11.724
2	Habeeb Al-Shabeeb (KSA)	

==== Heat 3 ====
Rank	Athlete	Time
1	Tomoyuki Kawabata (JPN)	11.488
2	Ahmed Al-Mansoori (UAE)	

==== Heat 4 ====
Rank	Athlete	Time
1	Im Chae-bin (KOR)	11.868
2	Mow Ching Yin (HKG)	

==== Heat 5 ====
Rank	Athlete	Time
1	Bao Saifei (CHN)	11.448
2	Amrit Singh (IND)	

==== Heat 6 ====
Rank	Athlete	Time
1	Xu Chao (CHN)	10.908
2	Amarjeet Singh Nagi (IND)	

==== Heat 7 ====
Rank	Athlete	Time
1	Mohammad Daneshvar (IRI)	10.966
2	Law Kwun Wa (HKG)	

==== Heat 8 ====
Rank	Athlete	Time
1	Mohd Edrus Yunus (MAS)	10.711
2	Liao Kuo-lung (TPE)	

==== Heat 9 ====
Rank	Athlete	Time
1	Hassan Ali Varposhti (IRI)	10.855
2	Choi Lae-seon (KOR)	

=== 1/16 final repechages ===
==== Heat 1 ====
Rank	Athlete	Time
1	Choi Lae-seon (KOR)	11.102
2	Amarjeet Singh Nagi (IND)	
3	Mohammed Al-Mushaykhis (KSA)	

==== Heat 2 ====
Rank	Athlete	Time
1	Law Kwun Wa (HKG)	12.492
2	Habeeb Al-Shabeeb (KSA)	
3	Amrit Singh (IND)	REL

==== Heat 3 ====
Rank	Athlete	Time
1	Liao Kuo-lung (TPE)	11.181
2	Mow Ching Yin (HKG)	
3	Ahmed Al-Mansoori (UAE)	

=== 1/8 finals ===
==== Heat 1 ====
Rank	Athlete	Time
1	Seiichiro Nakagawa (JPN)	11.033
2	Liao Kuo-lung (TPE)	

==== Heat 2 ====
Rank	Athlete	Time
1	Azizulhasni Awang (MAS)	11.202
2	Law Kwun Wa (HKG)	

==== Heat 3 ====
Rank	Athlete	Time
1	Tomoyuki Kawabata (JPN)	10.409
2	Choi Lae-seon (KOR)	

==== Heat 4 ====
Rank	Athlete	Time
1	Hassan Ali Varposhti (IRI)	10.634
2	Im Chae-bin (KOR)	REL

==== Heat 5 ====
Rank	Athlete	Time
1	Bao Saifei (CHN)	10.546
2	Mohd Edrus Yunus (MAS)	

==== Heat 6 ====
Rank	Athlete	Time
1	Xu Chao (CHN)	10.674
2	Mohammad Daneshvar (IRI)	

=== 1/8 final repechages ===
==== Heat 1 ====
Rank	Athlete	Time
1	Im Chae-bin (KOR)	10.548
2	Mohammad Daneshvar (IRI)	
3	Liao Kuo-lung (TPE)	

==== Heat 2 ====
Rank	Athlete	Time
1	Choi Lae-seon (KOR)	10.656
2	Mohd Edrus Yunus (MAS)	
3	Law Kwun Wa (HKG)	

=== Race for 9th–12th places ===
Rank	Athlete	Time
1	Mohd Edrus Yunus (MAS)	10.950
2	Liao Kuo-lung (TPE)	
3	Mohammad Daneshvar (IRI)	
4	Law Kwun Wa (HKG)	

=== Quarterfinals ===
==== Heat 1 ====
Rank	Athlete	1st race	2nd race	Decider
1	Seiichiro Nakagawa (JPN)	10.639	10.581	
2	Choi Lae-seon (KOR)			

==== Heat 2 ====
Rank	Athlete	1st race	2nd race	Decider
1	Azizulhasni Awang (MAS)	10.567	10.376	
2	Im Chae-bin (KOR)			

==== Heat 3 ====
Rank	Athlete	1st race	2nd race	Decider
1	Tomoyuki Kawabata (JPN)	10.555	10.713	
2	Xu Chao (CHN)			

==== Heat 4 ====
Rank	Athlete	1st race	2nd race	Decider
1	Bao Saifei (CHN)	10.738	10.644	
2	Hassan Ali Varposhti (IRI)			

=== Race for 5th–8th places ===
Rank	Athlete	Time
1	Im Chae-bin (KOR)	10.905
2	Hassan Ali Varposhti (IRI)	
3	Choi Lae-seon (KOR)	
4	Xu Chao (CHN)	

=== Semifinals ===
==== Heat 1 ====
Rank	Athlete	1st race	2nd race	Decider
1	Seiichiro Nakagawa (JPN)	10.662	10.528	
2	Bao Saifei (CHN)			

==== Heat 2 ====
Rank	Athlete	1st race	2nd race	Decider
1	Tomoyuki Kawabata (JPN)	10.463	10.529	
2	Azizulhasni Awang (MAS)			

=== Finals ===
==== Bronze ====
Rank	Athlete	1st race	2nd race	Decider
1	Bao Saifei (CHN)		10.602	10.677
2	Azizulhasni Awang (MAS)	10.547		

==== Gold ====
Rank	Athlete	1st race	2nd race	Decider
1	Seiichiro Nakagawa (JPN)	10.751	10.696	
2	Tomoyuki Kawabata (JPN)			

== Final standing ==
Rank	Athlete
1st place, gold medalist(s)	Seiichiro Nakagawa (JPN)
2nd place, silver medalist(s)	Tomoyuki Kawabata (JPN)
3rd place, bronze medalist(s)	Bao Saifei (CHN)
4	Azizulhasni Awang (MAS)
5	Im Chae-bin (KOR)
6	Hassan Ali Varposhti (IRI)
7	Choi Lae-seon (KOR)
8	Xu Chao (CHN)
9	Mohd Edrus Yunus (MAS)
10	Liao Kuo-lung (TPE)
11	Mohammad Daneshvar (IRI)
12	Law Kwun Wa (HKG)
13	Amarjeet Singh Nagi (IND)
14	Amrit Singh (IND)
15	Mow Ching Yin (HKG)
16	Ahmed Al-Mansoori (UAE)
17	Habeeb Al-Shabeeb (KSA)
18	Mohammed Al-Mushaykhis (KSA)
19	Ali Moslim (KUW)
20	Othman Al-Akari (KUW)
21	Muhammad Shakeel (PAK)
