= 2008 UCI Track Cycling World Championships – Men's 1 km time trial =

Men's 1 km time trial at the 2008 UCI Track Cycling World Championships
- Venue: Manchester Velodrome
- Location: Manchester, United Kingdom
- Dates: 30 March
- Winning time: 1:01.332

Medalists
| gold medal | Teun Mulder | Netherlands |
| silver medal | Michaël D'Almeida | France |
| bronze medal | François Pervis | France |

The 2008 UCI Track Cycling World Championships – Men's 1 km Time Trial was the 2008 world championship track cycling time trial. It was held on 30 March 2008 in Manchester, United Kingdom. The event was conducted over a single round.

== World record ==
World Record
| WR | 58.875 | Arnaud Tournant (FRA) | La Paz (Bolivia) | 10 October 2001 |

== Results ==
| Rank | Name | 250 m | 500 m | 750 m | Time | Speed (km/h) |
| Rank | Name | 250 m | 250–500 | 500–750 | 750–1000 | Speed (km/h) |
|---|---|---|---|---|---|---|
| 1st place, gold medalist(s) | Teun Mulder (NED) | 18.145 (2) | 31.717 (2) | 45.912 (2) | 1:01.332 | 58.696 |
| 1st place, gold medalist(s) | Teun Mulder (NED) | 18.145 (2) | 13.572 (4) | 14.195 (2) | 15.420 (3) | 58.696 |
| 2nd place, silver medalist(s) | Michaël D'Almeida (FRA) | 18.657 (6) | 32.027 (4) | 46.125 (3) | 1:01.514 | 58.523 |
| 2nd place, silver medalist(s) | Michaël D'Almeida (FRA) | 18.657 (6) | 13.370 (1) | 14.098 (1) | 15.389 (2) | 58.523 |
| 3rd place, bronze medalist(s) | François Pervis (FRA) | 18.037 (1) | 31.484 (1) | 45.797 (1) | 1.01.579 | 58.461 |
| 3rd place, bronze medalist(s) | François Pervis (FRA) | 18.037 (1) | 13.447 (2) | 14.313 (4) | 15.782 (12) | 58.461 |
| 4 | Matthew Crampton (GBR) | 18.338 (4) | 31.882 (3) | 46.251 (4) | 1:01.822 | 58.231 |
| 4 | Matthew Crampton (GBR) | 18.338 (4) | 13.544 (3) | 14.369 (5) | 15.571 (7) | 58.231 |
| 5 | Mohd Rizal Tisin (MAS) | 18.998 (17) | 32.663 (10) | 46.954 (8) | 1:02.409 | 57.683 |
| 5 | Mohd Rizal Tisin (MAS) | 18.998 (17) | 13.665 (6) | 14.291 (3) | 15.455 (4) | 57.683 |
| 6 | Yevhen Bolibrukh (UKR) | 18.691 (7) | 32.337 (7) | 46.724 (5) | 1:02.432 | 57.662 |
| 6 | Yevhen Bolibrukh (UKR) | 18.691 (7) | 13.646 (5) | 14.387 (6) | 15.708 (11) | 57.662 |
| 7 | Li Wen Hao (CHN) | 18.856 (13) | 32.661 (9) | 47.128 (10) | 1:02.503 | 57.597 |
| 7 | Li Wen Hao (CHN) | 18.856 (13) | 13.805 (11) | 14.467 (10) | 15.375 (1) | 57.597 |
| 8 | Scott Sunderland (AUS) | 18.308 (3) | 32.152 (6) | 47.058 (9) | 1:02.515 | 57.586 |
| 8 | Scott Sunderland (AUS) | 18.308 (3) | 13.844 (14) | 14.906 (21) | 15.457 (5) | 57.586 |
| 9 | Tim Veldt (NED) | 18.883 (14) | 32.806 (14) | 47.245 (11) | 1:02.757 | 57.364 |
| 9 | Tim Veldt (NED) | 18.883 (14) | 13.923 (16) | 14.439 (9) | 15.512 (6) | 57.364 |
| 10 | Edward Dawkins (NZL) | 18.984 (16) | 32.884 (17) | 47.306 (12) | 1:02.893 | 57.240 |
| 10 | Edward Dawkins (NZL) | 18.984 (16) | 13.900 (15) | 14.422 (8) | 15.587 (8) | 57.240 |
| 11 | Feng Yong (CHN) | 19.197 (19) | 32.953 (19) | 47.344 (14) | 1:02.955 | 57.183 |
| 11 | Feng Yong (CHN) | 19.197 (19) | 13.756 (9) | 14.391 (7) | 15.611 (9) | 57.183 |
| 12 | David Daniell (GBR) | 18.709 (8) | 32.402 (8) | 46.895 (7) | 1:03.018 | 57.126 |
| 12 | David Daniell (GBR) | 18.709 (8) | 13.693 (7) | 14.493 (12) | 16.123 (18) | 57.126 |
| 13 | Robert Förstemann (GER) | 18.350 (5) | 32.141 (5) | 46.825 (6) | 1:03.179 | 56.980 |
| 13 | Robert Förstemann (GER) | 18.350 (5) | 13.791 (10) | 14.684 (16) | 16.354 (21) | 56.980 |
| 14 | Ben Kersten (AUS) | 18.782 (9) | 32.737 (12) | 47.407 (15) | 1:03.330 | 56.845 |
| 14 | Ben Kersten (AUS) | 18.782 (9) | 13.955 (18) | 14.670 (14) | 15.923 (14) | 56.845 |
| 15 | Didier Henriette (FRA) | 18.803 (10) | 32.754 (13) | 47.460 (16) | 1:03.395 | 56.786 |
| 15 | Didier Henriette (FRA) | 18.803 (10) | 13.951 (17) | 14.706 (18) | 15.935 (16) | 56.786 |
| 16 | Michael Seidenbecher (GER) | 18.824 (11) | 32.666 (11) | 47.335 (13) | 1:03.428 | 56.757 |
| 16 | Michael Seidenbecher (GER) | 18.824 (11) | 13.842 (13) | 14.669 (13) | 16.093 (17) | 56.757 |
| 17 | Kamil Kuczyński (POL) | 18.838 (12) | 32.851 (15) | 47.697 (18) | 1:03.482 | 56.708 |
| 17 | Kamil Kuczyński (POL) | 18.838 (12) | 14.013 (21) | 14.846 (19) | 15.785 (13) | 56.708 |
| 18 | Hodei Mazquiarán Uría (ESP) | 19.101 (18) | 32.906 (18) | 47.581 (17) | 1:03.512 | 56.682 |
| 18 | Hodei Mazquiarán Uría (ESP) | 19.101 (18) | 13.805 (11) | 14.675 (15) | 15.931 (15) | 56.682 |
| 19 | Tomáš Bábek (CZE) | 19.722 (22) | 33.451 (22) | 47.920 (21) | 1:03.612 | 56.593 |
| 19 | Tomáš Bábek (CZE) | 19.722 (22) | 13.729 (8) | 14.469 (11) | 15.692 (10) | 56.593 |
| 20 | Sergey Polynskiy (RUS) | 19.219 (21) | 33.208 (20) | 47.901 (20) | 1:04.025 | 56.228 |
| 20 | Sergey Polynskiy (RUS) | 19.219 (21) | 13.989 (20) | 14.693 (17) | 16.124 (19) | 56.228 |
| 21 | Athanasios Mantzouranis (GRE) | 18.896 (15) | 32.874 (16) | 47.777 (19) | 1:04.202 | 56.073 |
| 21 | Athanasios Mantzouranis (GRE) | 18.896 (15) | 13.978 (19) | 14.903 (20) | 16.425 (22) | 56.073 |
| 22 | Vasileios Reppas (GRE) | 19.203 (20) | 33.375 (21) | 48.588 (22) | 1:04.888 | 55.480 |
| 22 | Vasileios Reppas (GRE) | 19.203 (20) | 14.172 (22) | 15.213 (22) | 16.300 (20) | 55.480 |
