= Cycling at the 2014 Asian Games – Men's keirin =

Men's keirin at the 2014 Asian Games
- Venue: Incheon International Velodrome
- Date: 25 September 2014
- Competitors: 20 from 12 nations

Medalists
gold medal	Mohammad Daneshvar	Iran
silver medal	Kazunari Watanabe	Japan
bronze medal	Josiah Ng	Malaysia

The men's keirin competition at the 2014 Asian Games was held on 25 September 2014 at the Incheon International Velodrome.

== Schedule ==
All times are Korea Standard Time (UTC+09:00)

Date	Time	Event
Thursday, 25 September 2014	10:00	First round
Thursday, 25 September 2014	10:36	First round repechages
Thursday, 25 September 2014	16:24	Second round
Thursday, 25 September 2014	18:19	Finals

== Results ==
Legend

- DNF — Did not finish
- DNS — Did not start
- REL — Relegated

=== First round ===
==== Heat 1 ====
Rank	Athlete	Gap
1	Kang Dong-jin (KOR)	
2	Azizulhasni Awang (MAS)	+0.010
3	Bao Saifei (CHN)	+0.336
4	Wu Lok Chun (HKG)	+0.459
5	Mahmoud Parash (IRI)	+0.548
6	Ahmed Al-Mansoori (UAE)	+3.279

==== Heat 2 ====
Rank	Athlete	Gap
1	Xu Chao (CHN)	
2	Kazunari Watanabe (JPN)	+0.085
3	Satjakul Sianglam (THA)	+0.154
4	Amarjeet Singh Nagi (IND)	+0.347
5	Law Kwun Wa (HKG)	+0.375
6	Muhammad Shakeel (PAK)	+3.761
7	Othman Al-Akari (KUW)	+4.638

==== Heat 3 ====
Rank	Athlete	Gap
1	Yuta Wakimoto (JPN)	
2	Mohammad Daneshvar (IRI)	+0.050
3	Im Chae-bin (KOR)	+0.126
4	Liao Kuo-lung (TPE)	+0.276
5	Amrit Singh (IND)	+2.052
6	Ali Moslim (KUW)	+6.586
7	Josiah Ng (MAS)	DNF

=== First round repechages ===
==== Heat 1 ====
Rank	Athlete	Gap
1	Josiah Ng (MAS)	
2	Bao Saifei (CHN)	+0.028
3	Mahmoud Parash (IRI)	+0.043
4	Liao Kuo-lung (TPE)	+0.053
5	Amarjeet Singh Nagi (IND)	+3.424
6	Muhammad Shakeel (PAK)	+7.438
—	Ali Moslim (KUW)	DNS

==== Heat 2 ====
Rank	Athlete	Gap
1	Im Chae-bin (KOR)	
2	Satjakul Sianglam (THA)	+0.175
3	Law Kwun Wa (HKG)	+0.260
4	Wu Lok Chun (HKG)	+0.402
5	Amrit Singh (IND)	+0.407
6	Ahmed Al-Mansoori (UAE)	+0.797
—	Othman Al-Akari (KUW)	DNS

=== Second round ===
==== Heat 1 ====
Rank	Athlete	Gap
1	Kazunari Watanabe (JPN)	
2	Josiah Ng (MAS)	+0.026
3	Mohammad Daneshvar (IRI)	+0.111
4	Kang Dong-jin (KOR)	+0.209
5	Mahmoud Parash (IRI)	+0.560
6	Satjakul Sianglam (THA)	+1.062

==== Heat 2 ====
Rank	Athlete	Gap
1	Yuta Wakimoto (JPN)	
2	Bao Saifei (CHN)	+0.157
3	Azizulhasni Awang (MAS)	+0.282
4	Im Chae-bin (KOR)	+0.351
5	Xu Chao (CHN)	+1.060
6	Law Kwun Wa (HKG)	+1.597

=== Finals ===
==== Final 7–12 ====
Rank	Athlete	Gap
1	Im Chae-bin (KOR)	
2	Xu Chao (CHN)	+0.051
3	Kang Dong-jin (KOR)	+0.091
4	Mahmoud Parash (IRI)	+0.095
5	Satjakul Sianglam (THA)	+0.204
6	Law Kwun Wa (HKG)	+2.508

==== Final 1–6 ====
Rank	Athlete	Gap
1	Mohammad Daneshvar (IRI)	
2	Kazunari Watanabe (JPN)	+0.014
3	Josiah Ng (MAS)	+0.124
4	Bao Saifei (CHN)	+0.965
5	Yuta Wakimoto (JPN)	+1.866
6	Azizulhasni Awang (MAS)	REL

== Final standing ==
Rank	Athlete
1st place, gold medalist(s)	Mohammad Daneshvar (IRI)
2nd place, silver medalist(s)	Kazunari Watanabe (JPN)
3rd place, bronze medalist(s)	Josiah Ng (MAS)
4	Bao Saifei (CHN)
5	Yuta Wakimoto (JPN)
6	Azizulhasni Awang (MAS)
7	Im Chae-bin (KOR)
8	Xu Chao (CHN)
9	Kang Dong-jin (KOR)
10	Mahmoud Parash (IRI)
11	Satjakul Sianglam (THA)
12	Law Kwun Wa (HKG)
13	Wu Lok Chun (HKG)
13	Liao Kuo-lung (TPE)
15	Amarjeet Singh Nagi (IND)
15	Amrit Singh (IND)
17	Muhammad Shakeel (PAK)
17	Ahmed Al-Mansoori (UAE)
19	Othman Al-Akari (KUW)
19	Ali Moslim (KUW)
