= 2009 UCI Track Cycling World Championships – Men's team sprint =

Men's team sprint at the 2009 UCI Track Cycling World Championships
- Venue: BGŻ Arena, Pruszków
- Date: 25 March 2009

The Men's team sprint event of the 2009 UCI Track Cycling World Championships was held on 25 March 2009.

== Qualifying ==
Rank	Name	Nation	Time	Speed (km/h)	Notes
1	Grégory Baugé; Michaël D'Almeida; Kévin Sireau	France	43.614	61.906	Q
2	Matthew Crampton; Jason Kenny; Jamie Staff	Great Britain	43.738	61.731	Q
3	René Enders; Robert Förstemann; Stefan Nimke	Germany	43.911	61.488	q
4	Daniel Ellis; Shane Perkins; Scott Sunderland	Australia	44.115	61.203	q
5	Maciej Bielecki; Kamil Kuczyński; Łukasz Kwiatkowski	Poland	44.865	60.180	
6	Azizulhasni Awang; Josiah Ng Onn Lam; Mohd Rizal Tisin	Malaysia	44.996	60.005	
7	Teun Mulder; Yondi Schmidt; Tim Veldt	Netherlands	44.999	60.001	
8	Kazuya Narita; Yudai Nitta; Kazunari Watanabe	Japan	45.139	59.815	
9	Wen Hao Li; Lei Zhang; Zixiang Zhang	China	45.201	59.733	
10	Sergey Borisov; Sergey Kucherov; Valentin Savitskiy	Russia	45.513	59.323	
11	Yevhen Bolibrukh; Yuriy Tsyupyk; Andrii Vynokurov	Ukraine	45.713	59.064	
12	David Alonso Castillo; Álvaro Alonso Rubio; Hodei Mazquiarán Uría	Spain	45.771	58.989	
13	Sotirios Bretas; Christos Volikakis; Zafeirios Volikakis	Greece	46.578	57.967	
14	Tomáš Bábek; Filip Ditzel; Adam Ptáčník	Czech Republic	46.594	57.947	
15	Jonathan Marín; Leonardo Narváez; Hernán Sánchez	Colombia	46.729	57.779	
-	Azikiwe Kellar; Christopher Sellier; Haseem McLean	Trinidad and Tobago	DNS		

=== Finals ===
Rank	Name	Nation	Time	Speed (km/h)	Notes
Race for bronze
1	René Enders; Robert Förstemann; Stefan Nimke	Germany	43.912	61.486	
2	Daniel Ellis; Shane Perkins; Scott Sunderland	Australia	43.986	61.383	
Race for gold
1	Grégory Baugé; Mickaël Bourgain; Kévin Sireau	France	43.510	62.054	
2	Matthew Crampton; Jason Kenny; Jamie Staff	Great Britain	43.869	61.546	
