= 2007 UCI Track Cycling World Championships – Men's 1 km time trial =

Men's 1 km time trial at the 2007 UCI Track Cycling World Championships
- Venue: Palma Arena
- Location: Palma de Mallorca, Spain
- Dates: 1 April
- Winning time: 1:00.999

Medalists
gold medal	Chris Hoy	Great Britain
silver medal	François Pervis	France
bronze medal	Jamie Staff	Great Britain

The 2007 UCI Track Cycling World Championships – Men's 1 km Time Trial was the 2007 world championship track cycling time trial. It was held on April 1, 2007, and won by Chris Hoy, who had announced beforehand his intention to stop competing in the event following these championships since the event would not be included on the Olympics programme from 2008. The event was conducted over a single round.

== World record ==
World Record
WR	58.875	Arnaud Tournant (FRA)	La Paz (Bolivia)	October 10, 2001

== Results ==
Rank	Athlete	Nation	Time	Notes
1st place, gold medalist(s)	Chris Hoy	Great Britain	1:00.999	
2nd place, silver medalist(s)	François Pervis	France	1:01.838	
3rd place, bronze medalist(s)	Jamie Staff	Great Britain	1.02.074	
4	Tim Veldt	Netherlands	1:02.480	
5	Teun Mulder	Netherlands	1:02.567	
6	Didier Henriette	France	1:02.772	
7	Maximilian Levy	Germany	1:03.368	
8	Scott Sunderland	Australia	1:03.517	
9	Michael Seidbecher	Germany	1:03.781	
10	Álvaro Alonso	Spain	1:03.914	
11	Seiichiro Nakagawa	Japan	1:03.937	
12	Feng Yong	China	1:04.196	
13	Joel Leonard	Australia	1:04.265	
14	Yevgan Bolibrukh	Ukraine	1:04.396	
15	Vasileios Reppas	Greece	1:04.534	
16	Athanasios Mantzouranis	Greece	1:04.694	
17	Marco Brossa	Italy	1:05.191	
18	Hodei Mazquarian	Spain	1:05.375	
19	Azizulhasni Awang	Malaysia	1:05.773	
20	Mohd Rizal Tisin	Malaysia	1:05.836	
