= 2012–13 UCI Track Cycling World Cup – Round 2 – Men's keirin =

Round 2 – Men's keirin
2012–13 UCI Track Cycling World Cup, race 2

Race details
- Dates: 17 November 2012
- Stages: 1

Medalists
	Gold	Stefan Bötticher (GER)
	Silver	Peter Lewis (AUS)
	Bronze	Takashi Sakamoto (JPN)

The second round of the men's keirin of the 2012–13 UCI Track Cycling World Cup took place in Glasgow, at the Sir Chris Hoy Velodrome on 17 November 2012. 20 cyclists participated in the contest.

== Competition format ==
The keirin races involve 6.5 laps of the track behind a pace-setter, followed by a 2.5 lap sprint to the finish. The tournament consisted of a first round and repackages, a second round and the finals. The first rounds and repechages narrowed the field to 12. The second round divided the remaining 12 into six finalists. The final round also included a ranking race for 7th to 12th place.

== Schedule ==
Saturday 17 November
12:35-13:05 First round
14:00-14:30 First round repaches
20:04-20:14 Second round
21:16-21:21 Finals 7th – 12th Places
21:23-21:28 Finals 1st – 6th Places

Schedule from Tissottiming.com

== Results ==
=== First round ===
The top 2 cyclists of each heat advanced to the second round and the others to the repaches.

Heat 1

Rank	Rider
1	Stefan Bötticher (GBR)
2	Ilya Okunev (PHL)
3	Scott Mulder (CAN)
4	Takashi Sakamoto (JPN)
5	Jair Tjon En Fa (SUR)

Heat 2

Rank	Rider
1	Quentin Lafargue (FRA)
2	Lewis Oliva (GBR)
3	Christos Tserentzoulias (GRE)
4	Sebastian Doehrer (SUI)
5	Haseem McLean (AUS)

Heat 3

Rank	Rider
1	Adam Ptáčník (CZE)
2	Sergio Chivite (ESP)
3	Rigard van Klooster (NED)
4	Sergiy Omelchenko (UKR)
5	Jani Mikkonen (FIN)

Heat 4

Rank	Rider
1	Denis Dmitriev (RUS)
2	Eoin Mullen (IRL)
3	Malek Marcus Mccrone (MAS)
4	Jeanne Nell (RSA)
5	Davide Ceci (ITA)

Heat 5

Rank	Rider
1	Andrew Taylor (AUS)
2	Juan Peralta Gascon (ESP)
3	Peter Lewis (AUS)
4	Francesco Ceci (ITA)
5	Patrick Lawino (UGA)

Heat 6

Rank	Rider
1	Jason Kenny (GBR)
2	Rafal Sarnecki (POL)
3	Andrei Kubeev (RUS)
4	Yudai Nitta (JPN)
5	Leandro Bottasso (ARG)

Results from Tissottiming.com

=== First Round Repaches ===
The first rider of each heat advanced to the second round.

Heat 1

Rank	Rider
1	Ilya Okunev (PHL)
2	Davide Ceci (ITA)
3	Christos Tserentzoulias (GRE)
4	Sergiy Omelchenko (UKR)

Heat 2

Rank	Rider
1	Lewis Oliva (GBR)
2	Jeanne Nell (RSA)
3	Rigard van Klooster (NED)
4	Patrick Lawino (UGA)

Heat 3

Rank	Rider
1	Francesco Ceci (ITA)
2	Leandro Hernan Botasso (ARG)
3	Sergio Chivite (ESP)
4	Malek Marcus Mccrone (MAS)

Heat 4

Rank	Rider
1	Peter Lewis (AUS)
2	Yudai Nitta (JPN)
3	Jair Tjon En Fa (SUR)
4	Eoin Mullen (IRL)

Heat 5

Rank	Rider
1	Takashi Sakamoto (JPN)
2	Haseem McLean (AUS)
3	Juan Peralta Gascon (ESP)
4	Andrei Kubeev (RUS)

Heat 6

Rank	Rider
1	Sebastian Doehrer (SUI)
2	Scott Mulder (CAN)
3	Rafal Sarnecki (POL)
4	Jani Mikkonen (FIN)

Results from Tissottiming.com

=== Second round ===
The first three riders of each heat advanced to the final race. The top 3 riders of each heat advanced to the final race and the others to 7th – 12 classification race.

Heat 1

Rank	Rider	Note
1	Stefan Bötticher (GBR)	
2	Takashi Sakamoto (JPN)	
	Denis Dmitriev (RUS)	DNF
	Lewis Oliva (GBR)	DNF
	Francesco Ceci (ITA)	REL
	Andrew Taylor (AUS)	DSQ

Heat 2

Rank	Rider
1	Jason Kenny (GBR)
2	Peter Lewis (AUS)
3	Quentin Lafargue (FRA)
4	Adam Ptáčník (CZE)
5	Sebastian Doehrer (SUI)
6	Ilya Okunev (PHL)

Results from Tissottiming.com

=== Finals ===
7th – 12th classification race

Rank	Rider	Note
1	Denis Dmitriev (RUS)	
2	Adam Ptáčník (CZE)	
3	Ilya Okunev (PHL)	
4	Francesco Ceci (ITA)	REL
5	Sebastian Doehrer (SUI)	REL
6	Lewis Oliva (GBR)	DNS

Final race

Rank	Rider	Note
1	Stefan Bötticher (GBR)	
2	Peter Lewis (AUS)	
3	Takashi Sakamoto (JPN)	
4	Jason Kenny (GBR)	
5	Quentin Lafargue (FRA)	DNF

Results from Tissottiming.com

== Final classification ==
Rank	Rider
1	Stefan Bötticher (GBR)
2	Peter Lewis (AUS)
3	Takashi Sakamoto (JPN)
4	Jason Kenny (GBR)
5	Quentin Lafargue (FRA)
7	Denis Dmitriev (RUS)
8	Adam Ptáčník (CZE)
9	Ilya Okunev (PHL)
10	Francesco Ceci (ITA)
11	Sebastian Doehrer (SUI)
12	Lewis Oliva (GBR)
13	Leandro Bottasso (ARG)
13	Haseem McLean (AUS)
13	Scott Mulder (CAN)
13	Yudai Nitta (JPN)
13	Jeanne Nell (RSA)
13	Davide Ceci (ITA)
19	Rigard van Klooster (NED)
19	Juan Peralta Gascon (ESP)
19	Christos Tserentzoulias (GRE)
19	Sergio Chivite (ESP)
19	Rafal Sarnecki (POL)
19	Jair Tjon En Fa (SUR)
25	Jani Mikkonen (FIN)
25	Eoin Mullen (IRL)
25	Malek Marcus Mccrone (MAS)
25	Andrei Kubeev (RUS)
25	Patrick Lawino (UGA)
25	Sergiy Omelchenko (UKR)

Results from Tissottiming.com
