= 2009 UCI Track Cycling World Championships – Men's 1 km time trial =

Men's 1 km time trial at the 2009 UCI Track Cycling World Championships
- Venue: BGŻ Arena
- Location: Pruszków, Poland
- Date: 27 March 2009
- Winning time: 1:00.666

Medalists
gold medal	Stefan Nimke	Germany
silver medal	Taylor Phinney	United States
bronze medal	Mohd Rizal Tisin	Malaysia

The Men's 1 km time trial event of the 2009 UCI Track Cycling World Championships was held on 27 March 2009.

== Results ==
Rank	Name	Nation	250m	500m	750m	Final time	Speed (km/h)
1	Stefan Nimke	Germany	18.744 (12)	32.068 (6)	45.852 (1)	1:00.666	59.341
2	Taylor Phinney	United States	19.611 (25)	33.361 (22)	47.124 (10)	1:01.611	58.431
3	Mohd Rizal Tisin	Malaysia	18.826 (13)	32.402 (9)	46.477 (6)	1:01.658	58.386
4	Michaël D'Almeida	France	18.371 (4)	31.945 (3)	46.328 (3)	1:02.034	58.032
5	Scott Sunderland	Australia	18.341 (3)	32.022 (5)	46.535 (7)	1:02.144	57.929
6	Teun Mulder	Netherlands	18.231 (1)	31.922 (2)	46.345 (4)	1:02.209	57.869
7	David Daniell	United Kingdom	18.292 (2)	31.631 (1)	46.092 (2)	1:02.316	57.770
8	Kamil Kuczyński	Poland	18.453 (6)	31.994 (4)	46.439 (5)	1:02.356	57.733
9	Quentin Lafargue	France	19.064 (17)	32.968 (17)	47.310 (14)	1:02.669	57.444
10	Edward Dawkins	New Zealand	19.120 (19)	32.890 (14)	47.270 (13)	1:02.685	57.430
11	Yevgen Bolibrukh	Ukraine	18.899 (16)	32.656 (13)	47.123 (9)	1:02.860	57.270
12	Tim Veldt	Netherlands	19.089 (18)	32.995 (19)	47.410 (15)	1:02.886	57.246
13	François Pervis	France	18.620 (7)	32.230 (7)	46.847 (8)	1:02.976	57.164
14	Wen Hao Li	China	18.897 (15)	32.567 (10)	47.217 (11)	1:03.287	56.883
15	Miao Zhang	China	18.649 (9)	32.588 (11)	47.499 (17)	1:03.427	56.758
16	Michael Seidenbecher	Germany	18.660 (10)	32.632 (12)	47.433 (16)	1:03.479	56.711
17	Yondi Schmidt	Netherlands	18.442 (5)	32.396 (8)	47.238 (12)	1:03.480	56.710
18	Yudai Nitta	Japan	18.620 (7)	32.960 (15)	48.002 (21)	1:03.655	56.554
19	Adrian Tekliński	Poland	18.865 (14)	32.988 (18)	47.878 (18)	1:03.887	56.349
20	Clemens Selzer	Austria	18.697 (11)	32.967 (16)	48.028 (22)	1:04.077	56.182
21	Tomáš Bábek	Czech Republic	19.245 (21)	33.074 (20)	47.886 (19)	1:04.281	56.004
22	Filip Ditzel	Czech Republic	19.252 (22)	33.127 (21)	47.977 (20)	1:04.319	55.971
23	David Alonso Castillo	Spain	19.220 (20)	33.422 (23)	48.308 (23)	1:04.398	55.902
24	Nikolay Zhurkin	Russia	19.721 (26)	34.052 (24)	48.982 (25)	1:04.494	55.819
25	Gadi Chaid	South Africa	19.901 (27)	34.064 (25)	48.841 (24)	1:04.942	55.434
26	Juan Peralta Gascon	Spain	19.485 (23)	34.072 (26)	49.478 (26)	1:05.823	54.692
27	Yuriy Tsyupyk	Ukraine	19.581 (24)	34.111 (27)	49.550 (27)	1:06.206	54.375
28	Azikiwe Kellar	Trinidad and Tobago	19.920 (28)	34.794 (28)	50.919 (28)	1:08.981	52.188
