= Cycling at the 2010 Commonwealth Games – Men's keirin =

The Men's keirin at the 2010 Commonwealth Games in New Delhi, India took place on 6 October 2010 at the Indira Gandhi Arena.

== Round 1 ==
Heat 1

Rank	Rider
1	Shane Perkins (AUS)
2	Azizulhasni Awang (MAS)
3	Njisane Phillip (TRI)
4	Lewis Oliva (WAL)
5	Ross Edgar (SCO)
6	Peter Mitchell (ENG)
7	Amrit Singh (IND)

Heat 2

Rank	Rider
1	Josiah Ng (MAS)
2	Jason Niblett (AUS)
3	Barry Forde (BAR)
4	Bernard Esterhuizen (RSA)
5	Haseem McLean (TRI)
6	Chris Pritchard (SCO)
7	Prince Hylem (IND)

Heat 3

Rank	Rider
1	David Daniell (ENG)
2	Simon van Velthooven (NZL)
3	Travis Smith (CAN)
4	Mohd Rizal Tisin (MAS)
5	Kevin Stewart (SCO)
6	Thireef Smart (TRI)
7	Rajesh Chandrashekhar (IND)

== Round 1 repechage ==
Heat 1

Rank	Rider
1	Njisane Phillip (TRI)
2	Bernard Esterhuizen (RSA)
3	Chris Pritchard (SCO)
4	Kevin Stewart (SCO)
5	Amrit Singh (IND)

Heat 2

Rank	Rider
1	Peter Mitchell (ENG)
2	Mohd Rizal Tisin (MAS)
3	Haseem McLean (TRI)
4	Barry Forde (BAR)
5	Rajesh Chandrashekhar (IND)

Heat 3

Rank	Rider
1	Ross Edgar (SCO)
2	Travis Smith (CAN)
3	Lewis Oliva (WAL)
4	Prince Hylem (IND)
DSQ	Thireef Smart (TRI)

== Round 2 ==
Heat 1

Rank	Rider
1	Simon van Velthooven (NZL)
2	Jason Niblett (AUS)
3	David Daniell (ENG)
4	Njisane Phillip (TRI)
5	Travis Smith (CAN)
6	Mohd Rizal Tisin (MAS)

Heat 2

Rank	Rider
1	Josiah Ng (MAS)
2	Azizulhasni Awang (MAS)
3	Peter Mitchell (ENG)
DNF	Bernard Esterhuizen (RSA)
DNF	Ross Edgar (SCO)
REL	Shane Perkins (AUS)

== Finals ==
Classification race

Rank	Rider
7	Shane Perkins (AUS)
8	Travis Smith (CAN)
9	Ross Edgar (SCO)
10	Njisane Phillip (TRI)
11	Mohd Rizal Tisin (MAS)
DNS	Bernard Esterhuizen (RSA)

Medals race

Rank	Rider
1	Josiah Ng (MAS)
1	David Daniell (ENG)
1	Simon van Velthooven (NZL)
4	Jason Niblett (AUS)
5	Peter Mitchell (ENG)
REL	Azizulhasni Awang (MAS)
