= Cycling at the 2002 Commonwealth Games – Men's 1 km time trial =

Cycling Track – Men's 1 km time trial at the 2002 Commonwealth Games
- Venue: National Cycling Centre
- Dates: 28 July
- Competitors: 15 from 10 nations
- Winning time: 1:01.726

Medalists
gold medal	Chris Hoy	Scotland
silver medal	Jason Queally	England
bronze medal	Jamie Staff	England

The men's 500 m time trial at the 2002 Commonwealth Games, was part of the cycling programme, which took place on 28 July 2002.

== Records ==
Prior to this competition, the existing world record was as follows:

World record	Arnaud Tournant (FRA)	58.875	La Paz, Bolivia	10 October 2001

== Results ==
Rank	Rider	Time	Behind	Notes
1st place, gold medalist(s)	Chris Hoy (SCO)	1:01.726	–	GR
2nd place, silver medalist(s)	Jason Queally (ENG)	1:01.947	+0.221	
3rd place, bronze medalist(s)	Jamie Staff (ENG)	1:02.456	+0.730	
4	Ben Kersten (AUS)	1:02.736	+1.010	
5	Hayden Godfrey (NZL)	1:04.211	+2.485	
6	Danny Day (AUS)	1:04.236	+2.510	
7	Jim Fisher (CAN)	1:04.852	+3.126	
8	Matt Sinton (NZL)	1:06.028	+4.302	
9	Justin Grace (NZL)	1:06.342	+4.616	
10	Shawn Kelly (BAR)	1:07.773	+6.047	
11	Joby Ingram-Dodd (WAL)	1:08.509	+6.783	
12	Ako Kellar (TRI)	1:09.510	+7.784	
13	Ali Dilsher (PAK)	1:15.582	+13.856	
14	Barron Musgrove (BAH)	1:16.170	+14.444	
15	Johnny Hoyte (BAH)	1:18.696	+16.970	
