= Cycling at the 2008 Summer Olympics – Men's sprint =

Men's sprint at the Games of the XXIX Olympiad
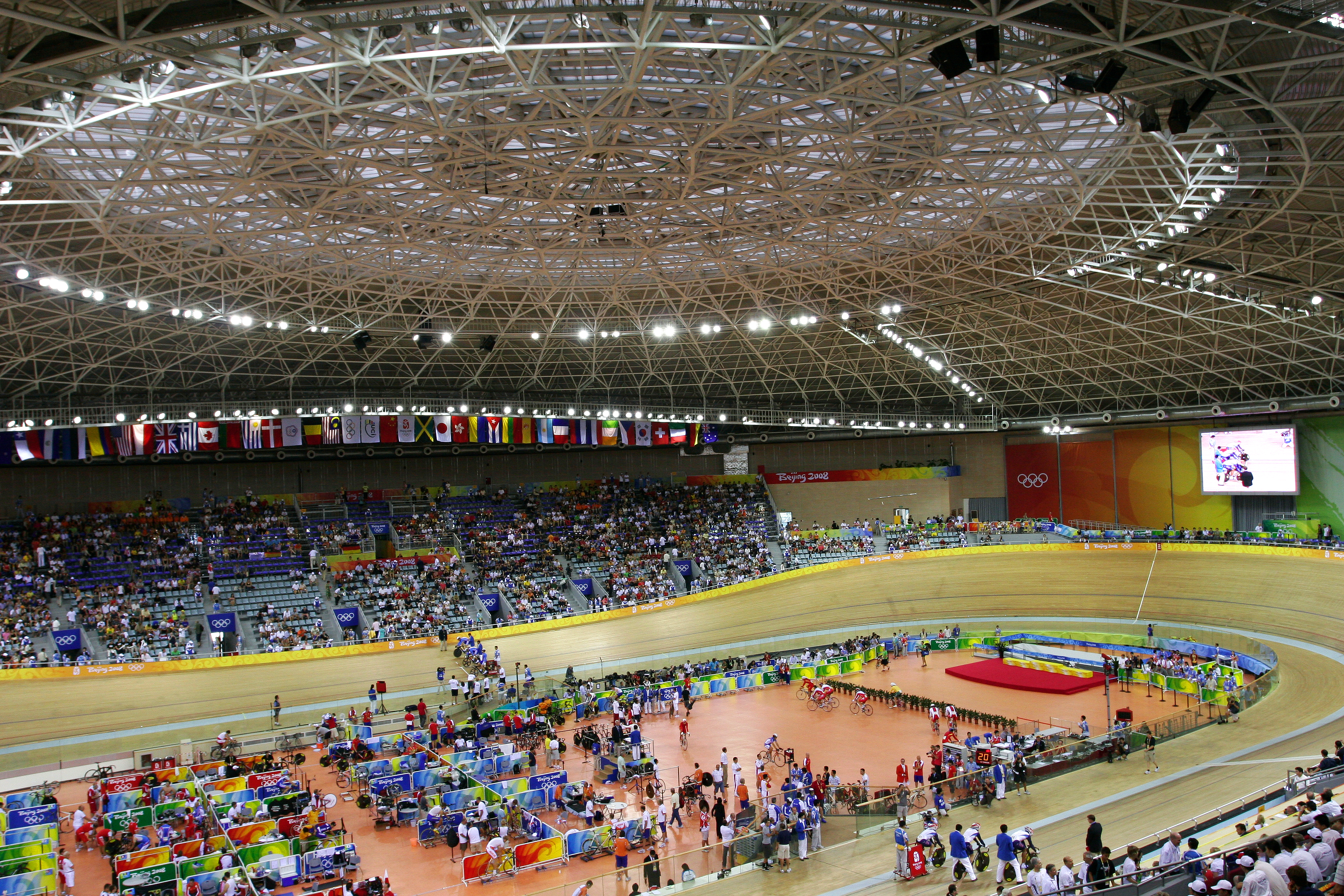
- Laoshan Velodrome
- Venue: Laoshan Velodrome
- Dates: August 17 (preliminaries—2nd round); August 18 (quarterfinals); August 19 (semifinals and finals)
- Competitors: 21 from 15 nations
- Winning time: 10.228/10.216

Medalists
1st place, gold medalist(s)		Chris Hoy	Great Britain
2nd place, silver medalist(s)		Jason Kenny	Great Britain
3rd place, bronze medalist(s)		Mickaël Bourgain	France

The men's sprint at the 2008 Summer Olympics took place on August 17–19 at the Laoshan Velodrome. There were 21 competitors from 15 nations, with each nation limited to two cyclists. The event was won by Chris Hoy of Great Britain, the nation's first victory in the men's sprint and first medal in the event since 1948. He faced his teammate Jason Kenny in the final, the first time since 1984 that one nation had taken the top two spots. Mickaël Bourgain of France earned bronze. Germany's four-Games (five if East Germany before unification is included) podium streak ended.

== Background ==
This was the 24th appearance of the event, which has been held at every Summer Olympics except 1904 and 1912. Three of the quarterfinalists from 2004 returned: gold medalist Ryan Bayley of Australia, silver medalist Theo Bos of the Netherlands, and eighth-place finisher Mickaël Bourgain of France. Bos (the 2004, 2006, and 2007 world champion) and Chris Hoy of Great Britain (the 2008 world champion and gold medalist in keirin and team sprint earlier in the 2008 Games) were the favorites.

The People's Republic of China, Estonia, and Russia each made their debut in the men's sprint. France made its 24th appearance, the only nation to have competed at every appearance of the event.

== Qualification ==
Each National Olympic Committee (NOC) could qualify up to 2 cyclists; there were a total of 21 quota places. Each of the 13 nations qualified for the team sprint could enter one cyclist in the individual sprint. Individuals could also earn qualification through the World Championship, the World Cup, and the "B" World Championship. The top five cyclists on the UCI ranking also qualified.

== Competition format ==
This track cycling event consisted of numerous rounds. The competition began with a flying time trial over 200 metres (the cyclists went around the track 3.5 times, or 875 metres, but only the last 200 metres were timed). All races after the qualifying round consisted of 3 laps of the track (750 metres) but with time recorded only for the final 200 metres. The top 18 cyclists in that qualifying round were seeded into the 1/16 finals. There, they raced one-on-one. The nine winners advanced to the 1/8 finals, while the nine losers were sent to the first repechage. In the repechage, the cyclists were placed in heats of three cyclists apiece; winners moved back into the main competition by advancing into the 1/8 finals.

The twelve cyclists in the 1/8 finals again competed one-on-one. The six winners advanced to the quarterfinals, with the six losers getting another chance at the second repechage. This repechage also consisted of three-cyclist heats, with the two winners moving on to the quarterfinals and the rest of the cyclists competing in a 9th to 12th place classification race.

Beginning with the quarterfinals, the head-to-head competitions switched to a best-of-three format. That format was also used for the semifinals and final. In addition, the bronze medal competition was a best-of-three match between the semifinal losers. The classification race for 5th to 8th places was a single race with all four cyclists competing.

== Records ==
The records for the sprint are 200 metre flying time trial records, kept for the qualifying round in later Games as well as for the finish of races.

World record	Theo Bos (NED)	9.772	Moscow, Russia	16 December 2006
Olympic record	Gary Neiwand (AUS)	10.129	Atlanta, United States	24 July 1996

Chris Hoy set a new Olympic record of 9.815 seconds in the qualifying round. The next four fastest men also came in under the old record.

== Schedule ==
All times are China Standard Time (UTC+8)

Date	Time	Round
Sunday, 17 August 2008	11:20; 16:30; 17:15; 17:45; 18:20	Qualifying round Round 1 First repechage 1/8 finals Second repechage
Monday, 18 August 2008	17:20	Quarterfinals
Tuesday, 19 August 2008	16:40; 16:50; 18:35 18:50	Semifinals; Classification 9–12; Final; Bronze medal match Classification 5–8

== Results ==
=== Qualifying round ===
200 metre time trial, with the top 18 riders advancing.

Rank	Cyclist	Nation	Time 200 m	Speed km/h	Notes
1	Chris Hoy	Great Britain	9.815	73.357	Q, OR
2	Jason Kenny	Great Britain	9.857	73.044	Q
3	Stefan Nimke	Germany	10.064	71.542	Q
4	Kévin Sireau	France	10.098	71.301	Q
5	Mickaël Bourgain	France	10.123	71.125	Q
6	Maximilian Levy	Germany	10.199	70.595	Q
7	Azizulhasni Awang	Malaysia	10.272	70.093	Q
8	Roberto Chiappa	Italy	10.314	69.808	Q
9	Theo Bos	Netherlands	10.318	69.780	Q
10	Mark French	Australia	10.337	69.652	Q
11	Kazunari Watanabe	Japan	10.346	69.592	Q
12	Ryan Bayley	Australia	10.362	69.484	Q
13	Teun Mulder	Netherlands	10.373	69.410	Q
14	Tsubasa Kitatsuru	Japan	10.391	69.290	Q
15	Michael Blatchford	United States	10.470	68.767	Q
16	Zhang Lei	China	10.497	68.591	Q
17	Łukasz Kwiatkowski	Poland	10.504	68.545	Q
18	Denis Dmitriev	Russia	10.565	68.149	Q
19	Adam Ptáčník	Czech Republic	10.569	68.123	
20	Vasileios Reppas	Greece	10.966	65.657	
21	Daniel Novikov	Estonia	11.187	64.360	

=== Round 1 ===
The eighteen qualifying cyclists from the preliminary round were paired, 1 vs. 18, 2 vs. 17, and so on, in head-to-head matches, with the winners advancing to the second round and the losers to the first round repechage.

==== Heat 1 ====
Rank	Cyclist	Nation	Time 200 m	Speed km/h	Notes
1	Chris Hoy	Great Britain	10.607	67.879	Q
2	Denis Dmitriev	Russia			R

==== Heat 2 ====
Rank	Cyclist	Nation	Time 200 m	Speed km/h	Notes
1	Jason Kenny	Great Britain	10.672	67.466	Q
2	Łukasz Kwiatkowski	Poland			R

==== Heat 3 ====
Rank	Cyclist	Nation	Time 200 m	Speed km/h	Notes
1	Stefan Nimke	Germany	10.828	66.494	Q
2	Zhang Lei	China			R

==== Heat 4 ====
Rank	Cyclist	Nation	Time 200 m	Speed km/h	Notes
1	Kévin Sireau	France	10.742	67.026	Q
2	Michael Blatchford	United States			R

==== Heat 5 ====
Rank	Cyclist	Nation	Time 200 m	Speed km/h	Notes
1	Mickaël Bourgain	France	10.562	68.168	Q
2	Tsubasa Kitatsuru	Japan			R

==== Heat 6 ====
Rank	Cyclist	Nation	Time 200 m	Speed km/h	Notes
1	Maximilian Levy	Germany	10.840	66.420	Q
2	Teun Mulder	Netherlands			R

==== Heat 7 ====
Rank	Cyclist	Nation	Time 200 m	Speed km/h	Notes
1	Ryan Bayley	Australia	10.762	66.902	Q
2	Azizulhasni Awang	Malaysia			R

==== Heat 8 ====
Rank	Cyclist	Nation	Time 200 m	Speed km/h	Notes
1	Roberto Chiappa	Italy	10.786	66.753	Q
2	Kazunari Watanabe	Japan			R

==== Heat 9 ====
Rank	Cyclist	Nation	Time 200 m	Speed km/h	Notes
1	Theo Bos	Netherlands	10.959	65.699	Q
2	Mark French	Australia			R

=== First repechage ===
The nine losers from the first round were put into three three-man matches, with the winner of each advancing to the next round.

==== First repechage heat 1 ====
Rank	Cyclist	Nation	Time 200 m	Speed km/h	Notes
1	Teun Mulder	Netherlands	10.889	66.121	Q
2	Mark French	Australia			
3	Denis Dmitriev	Russia			

==== First repechage heat 2 ====
Rank	Cyclist	Nation	Time 200 m	Speed km/h	Notes
1	Azizulhasni Awang	Malaysia	10.959	65.699	Q
2	Tsubasa Kitatsuru	Japan			
3	Łukasz Kwiatkowski	Poland			

==== First repechage heat 3 ====
Rank	Cyclist	Nation	Time 200 m	Speed km/h	Notes
1	Kazunari Watanabe	Japan	10.965	65.663	Q
2	Michael Blatchford	United States			
3	Zhang Lei	China			

=== 1/8 finals ===
The twelve cyclists who qualified this far were paired off again in head-to-head sprint matches.

==== 1/8 final 1 ====
Rank	Cyclist	Nation	Time 200 m	Speed km/h	Notes
1	Chris Hoy	Great Britain	10.636	67.694	Q
2	Kazunari Watanabe	Japan			R

==== 1/8 final 2 ====
Rank	Cyclist	Nation	Time 200 m	Speed km/h	Notes
1	Jason Kenny	Great Britain	10.531	68.369	Q
2	Azizulhasni Awang	Malaysia			R

==== 1/8 final 3 ====
Rank	Cyclist	Nation	Time 200 m	Speed km/h	Notes
1	Teun Mulder	Netherlands	10.888	66.127	Q
2	Stefan Nimke	Germany			R

==== 1/8 final 4 ====
Rank	Cyclist	Nation	Time 200 m	Speed km/h	Notes
1	Theo Bos	Netherlands	10.777	66.808	Q
2	Kévin Sireau	France			R

==== 1/8 final 5 ====
Rank	Cyclist	Nation	Time 200 m	Speed km/h	Notes
1	Mickaël Bourgain	France	10.734	67.706	Q
2	Roberto Chiappa	Italy			R

==== 1/8 final 6 ====
Rank	Cyclist	Nation	Time 200 m	Speed km/h	Notes
1	Maximilian Levy	Germany	10.763	66.895	Q
2	Ryan Bayley	Australia			R

=== Second repechage ===
The six cyclists who lost in the second round were matched into two three-man races, with the winner of each advancing to the next round.

==== Second repechage heat 1 ====
Rank	Cyclist	Nation	Time 200 m	Speed km/h	Notes
1	Kévin Sireau	France	10.570	68.117	Q
2	Kazunari Watanabe	Japan			C
3	Ryan Bayley	Australia			C

==== Second repechage heat 2 ====
Rank	Cyclist	Nation	Time 200 m	Speed km/h	Notes
1	Azizulhasni Awang	Malaysia	11.010	65.395	Q
2	Stefan Nimke	Germany			C
3	Roberto Chiappa	Italy			C

=== Quarterfinals ===
The eight cyclists qualified this far were paired for a best two-out-of-three series of 200 metre races. None of the pairings required a third race.

==== Quarterfinal 1 ====
Rank	Cyclist	Nation	Race 1	Race 2	Race 3	Notes
1	Chris Hoy	Great Britain	10.820	10.302	—N/a	Q
2	Azizulhasni Awang	Malaysia			—N/a	C

==== Quarterfinal 2 ====
Rank	Cyclist	Nation	Race 1	Race 2	Race 3	Notes
1	Jason Kenny	Great Britain	10.546	10.595	—N/a	Q
2	Kévin Sireau	France			—N/a	C

==== Quarterfinal 3 ====
Rank	Cyclist	Nation	Race 1	Race 2	Race 3	Notes
1	Maximilian Levy	Germany	10.689	10.660	—N/a	Q
2	Teun Mulder	Netherlands			—N/a	C

==== Quarterfinal 4 ====
Rank	Cyclist	Nation	Race 1	Race 2	Race 3	Notes
1	Mickaël Bourgain	France	10.524	10.463	—N/a	Q
2	Theo Bos	Netherlands			—N/a	C

=== Semifinals ===
The four cyclists qualified this far were paired again for a best two-out-of-three series of races.

==== Semifinal 1 ====
Rank	Cyclist	Nation	Race 1	Race 2	Race 3	Notes
1	Chris Hoy	Great Britain	10.260	10.358	—N/a	Q
2	Mickaël Bourgain	France			—N/a	B

==== Semifinal 2 ====
Rank	Cyclist	Nation	Race 1	Race 2	Race 3	Notes
1	Jason Kenny	Great Britain	10.594	10.335	—N/a	Q
2	Maximilian Levy	Germany			—N/a	B

=== Finals ===
The winners from the semifinals were paired to race for gold and silver, and the losers from that round raced for bronze. Each match was again the best two-out-of-three races.

==== 9th—12th place classification race ====
During the same session as the semifinals, the four cyclists who were eliminated in the second round repechage were put into a single four-man race to determine exact placings from ninth to twelfth.

Rank	Cyclist	Nation	Time 200 m	Speed km/h
9	Stefan Nimke	Germany	11.051	65.152
10	Roberto Chiappa	Italy		
11	Ryan Bayley	Australia		
12	Kazunari Watanabe	Japan		

==== 5th—8th place classification race ====
In the same session as the finals, the four cyclists who lost in the quarterfinals were put into one four-man 200 metre race to determine exact placings from fifth to eighth.

Rank	Cyclist	Nation	Time 200 m	Speed km/h
5	Kévin Sireau	France	10.719	67.170
6	Teun Mulder	Netherlands		
7	Theo Bos	Netherlands		
8	Azizulhasni Awang	Malaysia		

==== Bronze medal match ====
Rank	Cyclist	Nation	Race 1	Race 2	Race 3
3rd place, bronze medalist(s)	Mickaël Bourgain	France	11.047		10.560
4	Maximilian Levy	Germany		10.666	

==== Gold medal match ====
Rank	Cyclist	Nation	Race 1	Race 2	Race 3
1st place, gold medalist(s)	Chris Hoy	Great Britain	10.228	10.216	—N/a
2nd place, silver medalist(s)	Jason Kenny	Great Britain			—N/a

== Final classification ==
Rank	Cyclist	Nation
1st place, gold medalist(s)	Chris Hoy	Great Britain
2nd place, silver medalist(s)	Jason Kenny	Great Britain
3rd place, bronze medalist(s)	Mickaël Bourgain	France
4	Maximilian Levy	Germany
5	Kévin Sireau	France
6	Teun Mulder	Netherlands
7	Theo Bos	Netherlands
8	Azizulhasni Awang	Malaysia
9	Stefan Nimke	Germany
10	Roberto Chiappa	Italy
11	Ryan Bayley	Australia
12	Kazunari Watanabe	Japan
13	Mark French	Australia
14	Tsubasa Kitatsuru	Japan
15	Michael Blatchford	United States
16	Zhang Lei	China
17	Łukasz Kwiatkowski	Poland
18	Denis Dmitriev	Russia
19	Adam Ptáčník	Czech Republic
20	Vasileios Reppas	Greece
21	Daniel Novikov	Estonia
