= Hernán Sánchez =

Colombian cyclist (born 1984)

Personal information
- Full name: Hernán Sánchez Castillo
- Born: 23 December 1984 (age 41)

Cycling career
- Sport: Cycling
- Discipline: Track cycling
- Role: Rider
- Rider type: sprinter
Medal record
Representing Colombia
Pan American Games
| Bronze medal – third place | 2007 Rio de Janeiro | Team sprint |

Hernán Sánchez Castillo (born 23 December 1984) is a Colombian male track cyclist, and part of the national team. He competed in the team sprint event at the 2009 UCI Track Cycling World Championships.
