= Daniel Novikov =

Estonian cyclist (born 1989)

Personal information
- Full name: Daniel Novikov
- Born: 6 June 1989 (age 37) Tallinn, then part of Estonian SSR, Soviet Union
- Height: 1.90 m (6 ft 3 in)
- Weight: 92 kg (203 lb)

Cycling career
- Sport: Cycling
- Current team: Kalevi Jalgrattakool
- Discipline: Track
- Role: Rider
- Rider type: Sprinter

Daniel Novikov (born June 6, 1989) is an Estonian track cyclist, who specialized in the individual sprint events.

Novikov was born in Tallinn. He represented Estonia at the 2008 Summer Olympics in Beijing, and competed in the men's sprint track cycling. Novikov, however, failed to qualify for the latter rounds of the competition, as he placed twenty-first in the overall standings, with a time of 11.817 seconds, and a speed of 64.360 km/h. He also won gold and silver medals for sprint and keirin events, in the elite-B category of the 2007 UCI World Track Championships in Cape Town, South Africa.
