= Gadi Chaid =

South African cyclist

Personal information
- Born: 28 February 1986 (age 40)

Cycling career
- Sport: Cycling
- Discipline: Track cycling
- Role: Rider
- Rider type: sprinter

Gadi Chaid (born 28 February 1986) is a South African male track cyclist, and part of the national team. He competed in the 1 km time trial event at the 2009 UCI Track Cycling World Championships.
