= Zhang Zixiang =

Chinese cyclist

Personal information
- Born: 27 September 1986 (age 40)

Cycling career
- Sport: Cycling
- Discipline: Track cycling
- Role: Rider
- Rider type: sprinter

Zhang Zixiang (born 27 September 1986) is a Chinese male track cyclist, and part of the national team. He competed in the team sprint event at the 2009 UCI Track Cycling World Championships.
