= Tomoyuki Kawabata =

Japanese cyclist (born 1985)

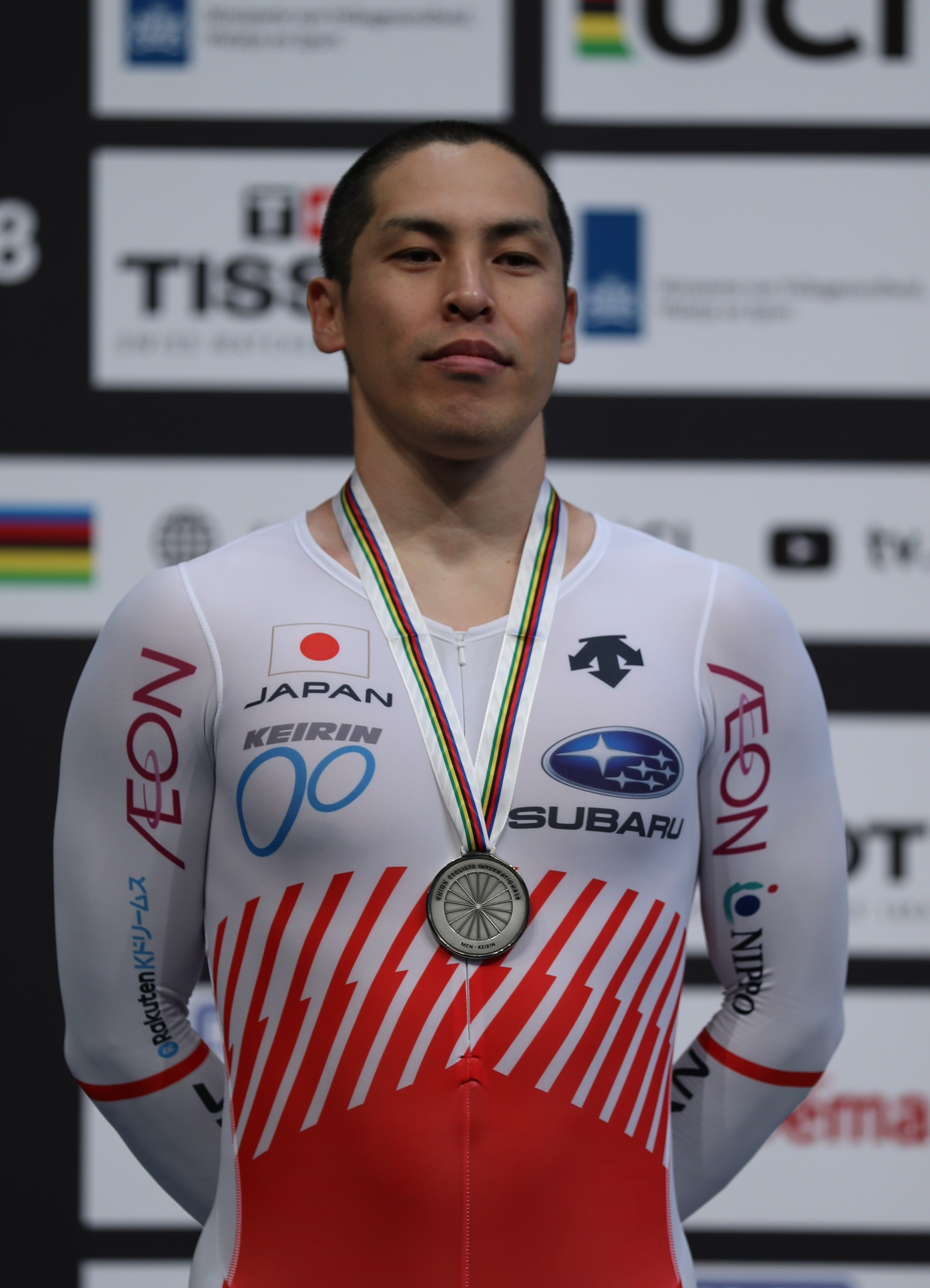
- Tomoyuki Kawabata: Silver medal in keirin at the Track Champs 2018

Personal information
- Born: 7 February 1985 (age 41)

Cycling career
- Sport: Cycling
- Discipline: Track cycling
- Role: Rider
Medal record
World Championships
Silver medal – second place	2018 Apeldoorn	Keirin
Asian Games
Silver medal – second place	2014 Incheon	Sprint
Bronze medal – third place	2014 Incheon	Team sprint
Asian Championships
Gold medal – first place	2015 Nakhon Ratchasima	Sprint
Gold medal – first place	2018 Nilai	Keirin
Silver medal – second place	2017 New Delhi	Sprint
Silver medal – second place	2018 Nilai	Team sprint
Bronze medal – third place	2017 New Delhi	Team sprint
Bronze medal – third place	2019 Jakarta	Keirin

Tomoyuki Kawabata (河端 朋之, Kawabata Tomoyuki; born 7 February 1985) is a Japanese professional racing cyclist. He rode at the 2015 UCI Track Cycling World Championships. He is also a professional keirin cyclist. He also competed at the 2014 Asian Games and won a bronze medal in the team sprint.
