= Sebastian Döhrer =

German cyclist

Sebastian Doehrer
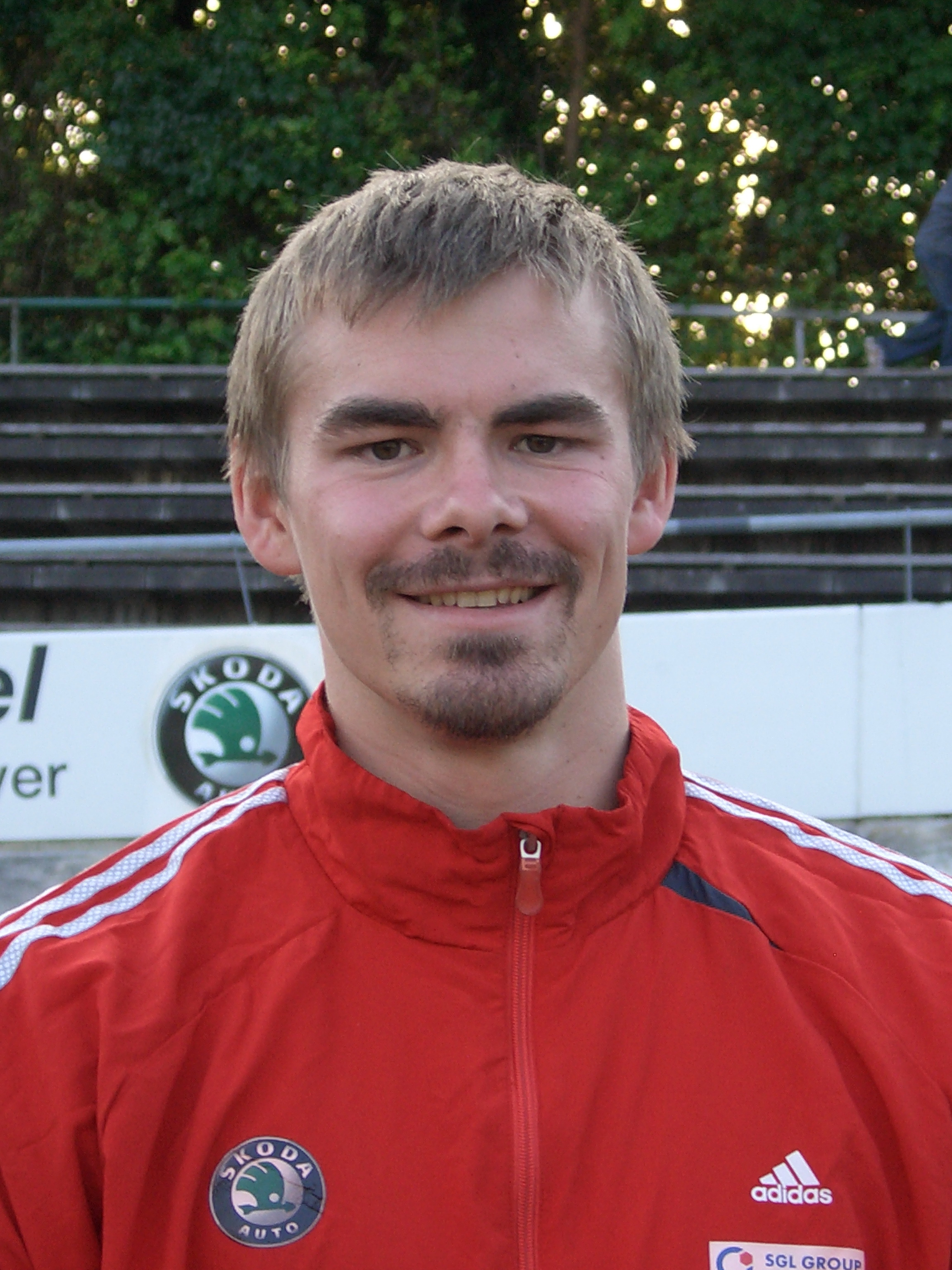
- Sebastian Döhrer, German cyclist

Personal information
- Born: 24 May 1985 (age 41) Suhl, East Germany

Cycling career
- Sport: Cycling
- Discipline: Track cycling
- Role: Rider
- Rider type: sprint

Sebastian Döhrer (born 24 May 1985) is a German male track cyclist, riding for the national team. He competed in the sprint event at the 2011 UCI Track Cycling World Championships.
