= David Daniell (cyclist) =

English racing cyclist (born 1989)

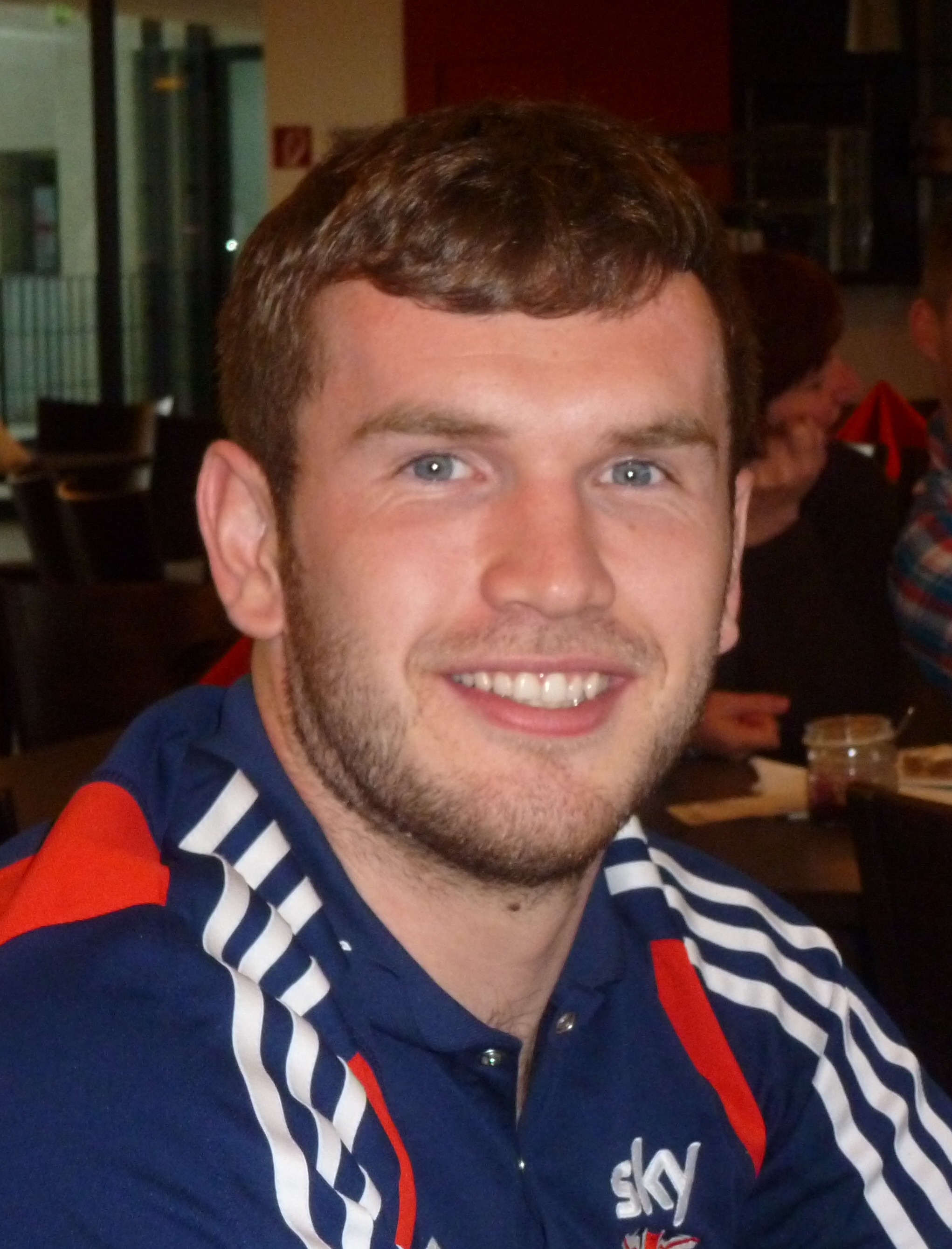

Personal information
- Full name: David Daniell
- Born: 23 December 1989 (age 36) Middlesbrough, England, United Kingdom

Cycling career
- Sport: Cycling
- Current team: Cleveland Wheelers
- Discipline: Track
- Role: Rider
- Rider type: Sprinter

Amateur team
- 2006–: Cleveland Wheelers

Major wins
- Team Sprint junior world champion (2006, 2007)

David Daniell (born 23 December 1989 in Middlesbrough) is an English competitive cyclist, specialising in track sprinting. A member of the British Cycling Olympic Academy, he is a Junior World Team Sprint Champion for the second year running.

Daniell began cycling after being spotted at his school in British Cycling's Go-Ride scheme. He was nominated for BBC Young Sports Personality of the Year in 2006 and was awarded Junior Sport's Personality of the Year at the 11th annual Evening Gazette Sports Awards 2007.

His first victory in a World Cup event was in October 2008, when he beat Yevgen Bolibrukh of Ukraine. He took the victory in the kilo event with a time of 1:01.996, a clear margin of over a second over the rest of the field.

After winning a silver medal in the Keirin at the 2010 Commonwealth Games, Daniell underwent knee surgery that kept him out of training for 15 weeks. Subsequently, he badly twisted his leg while riding on the road in autumn 2012, resulting in him losing 40 percent of the cartilage in his joint. He was dropped from the British team before Christmas 2012 as he was not performing at the same level as before his injury.

In 2013, he moved from Middlesbrough to East Kilbride, taking up a part-time position as a coach at the Sir Chris Hoy Velodrome in Glasgow. He has said that he aimed to qualify for the English team at the 2014 Commonwealth Games in Glasgow, but that he hoped to represent Scotland at the 2018 Commonwealth Games as he will have been resident in the country long enough.

== Palmarès ==
2005
British National Track Championships

2nd Sprint (U16)
5th 500m TT (U16)

2006
UCI Junior Track World Championships

1st Team Sprint (with Jason Kenny & Christian Lyte)
23rd 1km time trial

European Track Championships

1st 1km time trial, Junior
5th Team Sprint, Junior

British National Track Championships

2nd 3km Pursuit (Junior)
2nd Keirin (Junior)
3rd 1km time trial (Junior)
7th Sprint (Junior)
17th Team Sprint (with Jason Kenny & Dave Le Grys)

2007
1st 1km time trial, 2008–2009 UCI Track World Cup, Round 1, Manchester
European Track Championships

1st Sprint, Junior
2nd Team Sprint, Junior
11th Keirin, Junior

British National Track Championships

1st Sprint (Junior)
1st 1km time trial (Junior)
2nd Keirin (Junior)

UCI Junior Track World Championships

2nd Keirin
5th Kilo
8th Team Sprint

2009
2nd Under-23 Team Sprint, European Track Championships
UCI Track Cycling World Cup

2nd 1km time trial
32nd Team Sprint

12th 1km time trial, UCI Track Cycling World Championships

2010
2nd Keirin, Commonwealth Games
7th Kilo, UCI Track Cycling World Championships

2011
British National Track Championships

2nd Keirin
2nd Sprint
2nd Team Sprint
