= Azikiwe Kellar =

Trinidad and Tobago cyclist

Personal information
- Born: 30 July 1976 (age 50)

Cycling career
- Sport: Cycling
- Discipline: Track cycling
- Role: Rider
- Rider type: sprinter

Azikiwe Kellar (born 30 July 1976) is a Trinidad and Tobago male track cyclist, and part of the national team. He competed in the team sprint and 1 km time trial event at the 2009 UCI Track Cycling World Championships.
