= Im Chae-bin =

South Korean cyclist (born 1991)

Personal information
- Born: 29 October 1991 (age 34)

Cycling career
- Sport: Cycling
- Role: Rider
Medal record
Representing South Korea
Event	1st	2nd	3rd
Asian Games	1	0	1
Asian Cycling Championships	8	1	2
Total	9	1	3
Men's track cycling
Olympic Games
Asian Games
Gold medal – first place	2014 Incheon	Team sprint
Bronze medal – third place	2018 Jakarta-Palembang	Sprint
Asian Championships
Gold medal – first place	2014 Astana	1 km time trial
Gold medal – first place	2014 Astana	Team sprint
Gold medal – first place	2015 Nakhon Ratchasima	1 km time trial
Gold medal – first place	2015 Nakhon Ratchasima	Team sprint
Gold medal – first place	2016 Izu	Sprint
Gold medal – first place	2016 Izu	Keirin
Gold medal – first place	2016 Izu	Team sprint
Gold medal – first place	2018 Nilai	Team sprint
Silver medal – second place	2018 Nilai	Keirin
Bronze medal – third place	2014 Astana	Keirin
Bronze medal – third place	2018 Nilai	Sprint

Im Chae-bin (Korean: 임채빈, Korean pronunciation: [im.tɕʰɛ̝.bin]; born 29 October 1991) is a South Korean professional racing cyclist. He rode at the 2015 UCI Track Cycling World Championships. He also competed at the 2014 Asian Games and won a gold medal in team sprint.
