= Christos Tserentzoulias =

Greek cyclist (born 1984)

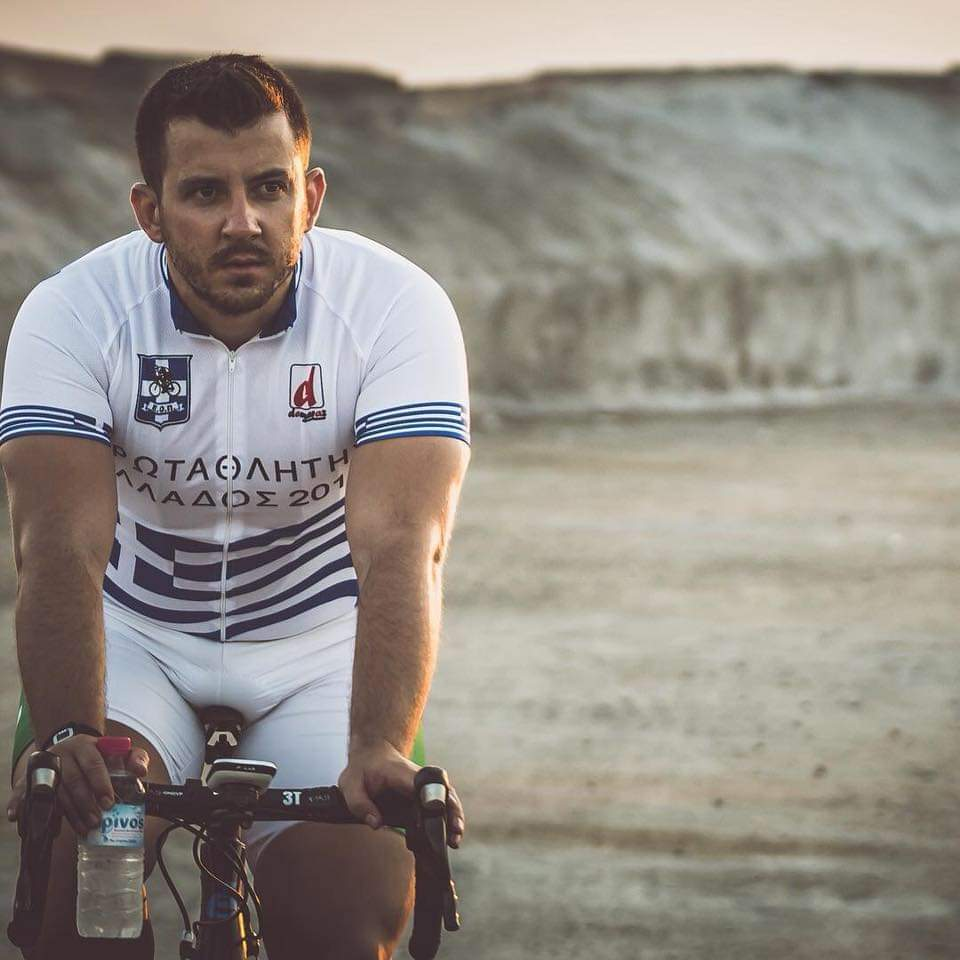

Personal information
- Born: 16 June 1984 (age 42) Aigio
- Height: 1.73 m (5 ft 8 in)
- Weight: 80 kg (176 lb)

Cycling career
- Sport: Cycling
- Current team: Panathinaikos AC
- Discipline: Track cycling
- Role: Rider
- Rider type: team sprint--sprint - keirin - 1 kilo

Amateur teams
- 1995-1997: Atlas Aigiou
- 1998-2015: P. O. Patras

Professional team
- 2016-: Panathinaikos

Major wins
- Greece champion. Balcan champion

Christos Tserentzoulias (born 16 June 1984) is a Greek male track cyclist. He was member of Greece Track cycling team from 2001 to 2006 and 2011 to 2014. He was 8 times Champion of Greece -

He won 31 medals in Greek Track cycling Championships.

Eight Balcan Championships Medals - 3 Gold.

He competed in International Gran Prix, European Championships, World Cups & World Championships Representing Greece National Team. He graduated from National and Kapodistrian University of Athens in the department of the School of Physical Education and Sport Science.

Currently working as fitness trainer, indoor cycling instructor, online cycling coaching & coaching member of Volikakis Christos team towards Tokyo 2020 Olympic Games.

Since 2024 is elected in municipality of Aigialeia and since 2026 he is Deputy Mayor of Sports.

He competed in the team sprint event at the 2012 UCI Track Cycling World Championships.
