= Haseem McLean =

Trinidadian cyclist

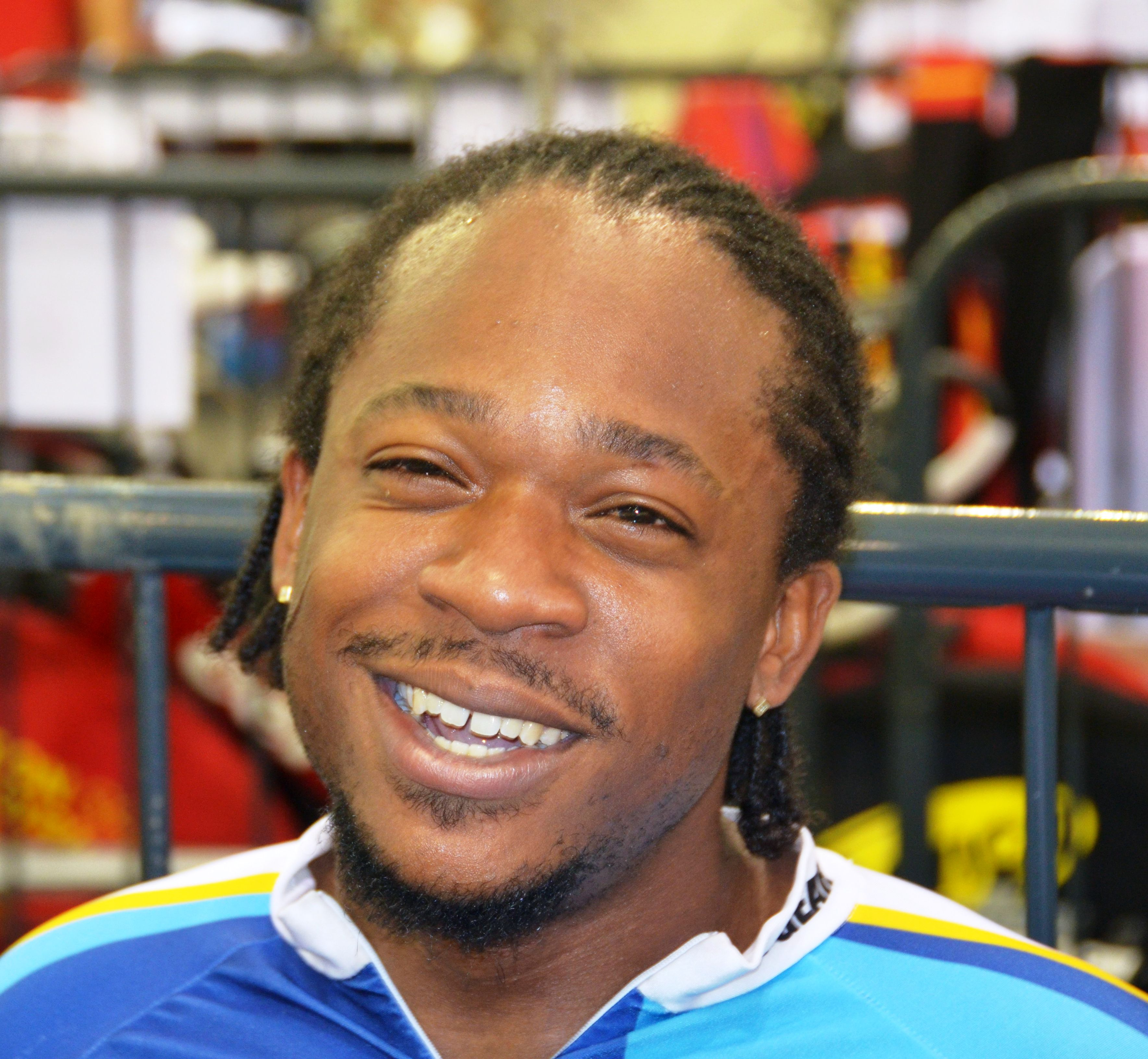
- A Trinidad and Tobago male track cyclist

Personal information
- Born: 26 July 1987 (age 39) San Fernando, Trinidad and Tobago

Cycling career
- Sport: Cycling
- Discipline: Track cycling
- Role: Rider
- Rider type: sprinter

Haseem McLean (born 26 July 1987 in San Fernando, Trinidad and Tobago) is a Trinidad and Tobago male track cyclist, and part of the national team. He was selected to compete in the team sprint event at the 2009 UCI Track Cycling World Championships, but the team did not start.
