= Panagiotis Voukelatos =

Greek cyclist (born 1983)

Personal information
- Full name: Panagiotis Voukelatos
- Born: 7 April 1983 (age 43) Patras, Greece
- Height: 1.70 m (5 ft 7 in)
- Weight: 73 kg (161 lb)

Cycling career
- Sport: Cycling
- Discipline: Track
- Role: Rider
- Rider type: Sprinter

Panagiotis Voukelatos (Greek: Παναγιώτης Βουκελάτος; born 7 April 1983 in Patras) is a Greek amateur track cyclist. He has won three men's team sprint titles at the Greek Championships (2004, 2005, and 2006), and later represented Greece at the 2008 Summer Olympics.

Voukelatos qualified for the Greek squad in the men's team sprint at the 2008 Summer Olympics in Beijing by receiving a berth for his team based on the nation's selection process from the UCI Track World Rankings. Teaming with Athanasios Mantzouranis and Vasileios Reppas, Voukelatos recorded a time of 45.645 and a speed of 59.152 km/h to deliver the Greek trio a tenth-place finish in the prelims.

== Career highlights ==
2004

- (gold) Greek Championships (Team sprint), Novices (GRE)
- (bronze) Greek Championships (Team pursuit), Greece

2005

- (gold) Greek Championships (Team sprint), Greece

2006

- (gold) Greek Championships (Team sprint), Greece

2007

- (gold) Athens Open Balkan Championships (Team sprint with Athanasios Mantzouranis and Christos Volikakis), Athens (GRE)

2008

- 10th Olympic Games (Team sprint with Athanasios Mantzouranis and Vasileios Reppas), Beijing (CHN)

2012

- (silver) Greek Championships (Team sprint), Athens (GRE)
