= Vasileios Reppas =

Greek cyclist (born 1988)

Personal information
- Full name: Vasileios Reppas
- Born: 4 November 1988 (age 37) Athens, Greece
- Height: 1.80 m (5 ft 11 in)
- Weight: 88 kg (194 lb)

Cycling career
- Sport: Cycling
- Discipline: Track
- Role: Rider
- Rider type: Sprinter

Vasileios Reppas (Greek: Βασίλειος Ρέππας; born 4 November 1988 in Athens) is a Greek amateur track cyclist. He has won the men's sprint title at the 2007 Greek national championships, and later represented his nation Greece at the 2008 Summer Olympics.

Reppas qualified for the Greek squad in two track cycling events at the 2008 Summer Olympics in Beijing by receiving a berth for his team based on the nation's selection process from the UCI Track World Rankings. Teaming with Athanasios Mantzouranis and Panagiotis Voukelatos in the men's sprint race, held on the first day of track cycling, Reppas recorded a time of 45.645 and a speed of 59.152 km/h to deliver the Greek trio a tenth-place finish in the prelims. The following day, in the men's individual sprint, Reppas posted a nineteenth-place time of 10.966 and an average speed of 65.657 km/h for his flying, 200 m opening time trial, narrowly missing out the first round matches by four tenths of a second (0.4).

== Career highlights ==
2004

- (silver) Greek Championships (500 m time trial), Novices (GRE)
- (silver) Greek Road Championships (ITT), Greece

2005

- (gold) Greek Junior Championships (1 km time trial), Athens (GRE)
- (gold) Greek Junior Championships (Pursuit), Athens (GRE)
- (silver) Greek Junior Championships (Sprint), Athens (GRE)
- (silver) Greek Junior Championships (Team sprint), Athens (GRE)

2006

- (silver) Greek Championships (Team sprint), Greece
- (bronze) European Junior Championships (Team sprint), Athens (GRE)

2007

- (gold) Greek Championships (Sprint), Greece
- (silver) Athens Open Balkan Championships (Team sprint), Athens (GRE)
- (silver) Greek Championships (Team sprint), Greece
- (bronze) Athens Open Balkan Championships (Sprint), Athens (GRE)
- (bronze) Greek Championships (Keirin), Greece
- (bronze) Greek Championships (1 km time trial), Greece

2008

- 10th Olympic Games (Team sprint with Athanasios Mantzouranis and Panagiotis Voukelatos, Beijing (CHN)
- 17th Olympic Games (Keirin), Beijing (CHN)

2009

- (bronze) Greek Championships (1 km time trial), Greece

2010

- 13th UCI World Championships (Team sprint with Christos and Zafeirios Volikakis), Copenhagen (DEN)
- 42nd UCI World Championships (Sprint), Copenhagen (DEN)
