= Jamie Staff =

American Olympic cyclist

Jamie Staff MBE
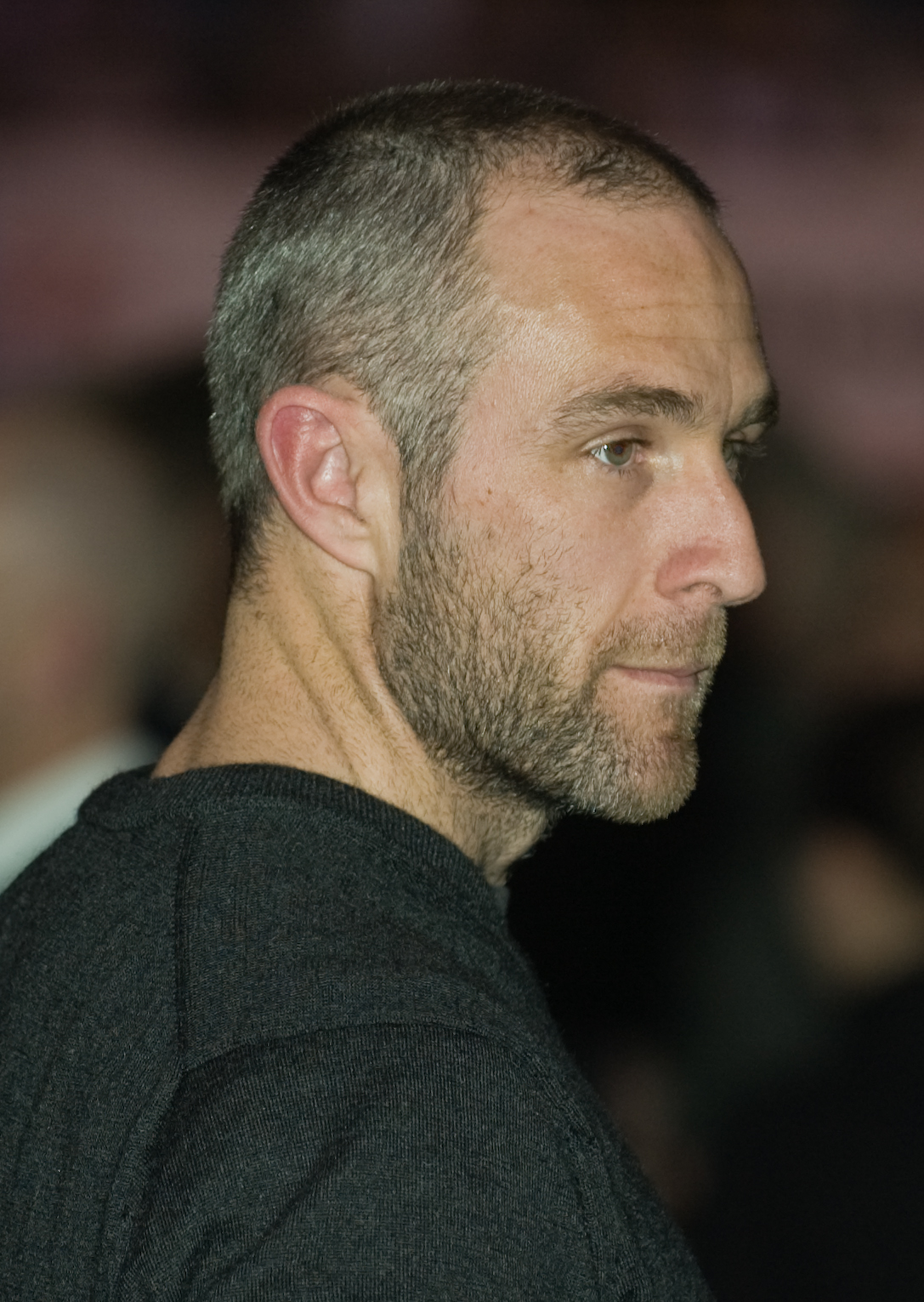
- Revolution 18, Manchester, 2007

Personal information
- Full name: Jamie Alan Staff
- Born: 30 April 1973 (age 53) Ashford, Kent, England
- Height: 1.78 m (5 ft 10 in)
- Weight: 92 kg (203 lb; 14.5 st)

Cycling career
- Sport: Cycling
- Disciplines: Track & BMX
- Role: Rider
- Rider type: Sprint

Professional team
- 2008–2010: Sky+ HD

Major wins
- 2008 Olympic Games Team Sprint
Medal record
Representing Great Britain
Men's track cycling
Olympic Games
Gold medal – first place	2008 Beijing	Team sprint
World Championships
Gold medal – first place	2002 Ballerup	Team sprint
Gold medal – first place	2004 Melbourne	Keirin
Gold medal – first place	2005 Los Angeles	Team sprint
Silver medal – second place	2006 Bordeaux	Team sprint
Silver medal – second place	2007 Palma de Mallorca	Team sprint
Silver medal – second place	2008 Manchester	Team sprint
Silver medal – second place	2009 Pruszków	Team sprint
Bronze medal – third place	2003 Stuttgart	Team sprint
Bronze medal – third place	2004 Melbourne	Team sprint
Bronze medal – third place	2007 Palma de Mallorca	1 km time trial
Representing England
Commonwealth Games
Silver medal – second place	2002 Manchester	Team sprint
Silver medal – second place	2006 Melbourne	Team sprint
Bronze medal – third place	2002 Manchester	1 km time trial
Men's BMX racing
Representing Great Britain
World Championships
Gold medal – first place	1996 Brighton	Cruiser

Jamie Alan Staff MBE (born 30 April 1973) is an English racing cyclist and coach, formerly on BMX and later on the track. A World and Olympic champion, he has also won numerous other medals at World Championships, World Cups and at the Commonwealth Games.

== Profile ==
Born in Ashford, Kent, Staff started in BMX when he was 9 years old, after seeing friends riding. A BMX rider who has won just about everything from the World Championships downwards, he decided at the end of 2001 that he wanted to win an Olympic medal. As BMX was not an Olympic sport at the time, he turned his attention to track cycling.

He qualified for the GB Cycling Team at the first attempt. A natural competitor, he revels in the combative nature of the Sprint and the keirin, though his stand-out rides so far have been in the team sprint and the Kilo.

At the 2002 Commonwealth Games, he was a member of the silver medal-winning England team sprint trio, an impressive semi-finalist in the sprint (during which he broke the national 200 m record) and the winner of a bronze in the Kilometer, behind GB team-mates Chris Hoy and Jason Queally.

However, he surpassed all expectations when he helped GB to win a gold medal in the team sprint at the 2002 UCI Track World Championships in Copenhagen, less than a year after taking up track racing. In 2003 he continued to progress, recording two personal best times in the "Kilo" (1 km time trial) and a win in the Mexico World Cup in the discipline.

In 2004 he competed at the Athens Olympics in the keirin and team sprint, but not medalling in either. This was despite becoming Keirin world champion only months before and setting the second fastest time in the Team Sprint competition, only to be knocked out by the German team, who set the fastest time.

He continued to focus on the sprint, achieving multiple silvers and bronzes at World Championships, and the 2006 Commonwealth Games. He finally tasted success again in the World Record-breaking British team sprint trio at the 2008 Beijing Olympics. Staff was responsible for the fastest ever first lap in a team sprint.

He was appointed Member of the Order of the British Empire (MBE) in the 2009 New Year Honours.

He announced his retirement from racing on 28 March 2010. In June it was announced that he would be joining USA Cycling to manage the USA national track sprint program.

Staff plans to set up a Youth Cycling Academy in Kent, UK in the near future which he will travel to and from the US and regularly oversee, the aim being to encourage new British talent.

== BMX ==
Staff was one of the many imports competing in the United States national ABA (American Bicycle Association) and NBL (National Bicycle League) series, and regularly made AA Pro mains (winning NBL Pro Nat.#1 (Elite) Men (AA) in 2001), (winning the World BMX title in 1996) until 2001 when he decided to concentrate on track cycling. Staff still participates in BMX occasionally (as in the 2002, X Games VIII - BMX Downhill).

== Major results ==
- 1996 World BMX Champion
- 2002 Bronze Kilo (England), Commonwealth Games
- 2002 Silver Team Sprint (England), Commonwealth Games
- 2002 Gold Team Sprint, World Championships
- 2003 Silver Sprint, National Championships
- 2003 Silver Sprint, World Cup, Mexico
- 2003 Gold Kilometre, World Cup, Mexico
- 2003 Gold Team Sprint, World Cup, South Africa
- 2004 Gold Keirin, UCI Track World Championships, Melbourne
- 2005 Gold Team Sprint, World Championships
- 2004 Bronze Team Sprint, World Championships, Melbourne
- 2006 Silver Team Sprint, Commonwealth Games, Melbourne
- 2006 Silver Team Sprint UCI Track World Championship Team Sprint
- 2007 Bronze UCI Track World Championship Kilometre
- 2008 Silver UCI Track World Championships Team Sprint
- 2008 Gold Team Sprint, Olympic Games, Beijing
- 2009 Silver UCI Track World Championships Team Sprint

== See also ==
- Cycling at the 2004 Summer Olympics – Men's keirin
- Cycling at the 2004 Summer Olympics – Men's team sprint
- Great Britain at the 2004 Summer Olympics
