= Álvaro Alonso (cyclist) =

Spanish cyclist

Personal information
- Full name: Álvaro Alonso Rubio
- Born: 13 December 1985 (age 40)

Cycling career
- Sport: Cycling
- Discipline: Track cycling
- Role: Rider
- Rider type: sprinter

Álvaro Alonso Rubio (born 13 December 1985) is a Spanish male track cyclist, and part of the national team. He competed in the team sprint event at the 2007 and 2009 UCI Track Cycling World Championships.
