= Bao Saifei =

Chinese cyclist (born 1989)

Personal information
- Born: 26 September 1989 (age 37) Ürümqi, Xinjiang, China

Cycling career
- Sport: Cycling
- Discipline: Track cycling
- Role: Rider
Medal record
Men's track cycling
Representing China
Asian Championships
Silver medal – second place	2016 Izu	team sprint

Bao Saifei (born 26 September 1989) is a Chinese male track cyclist. He competed at the 2009 UCI Track Cycling World Championships, 2010 UCI Track Cycling World Championships, 2011 UCI Track Cycling World Championships and 2015 UCI Track Cycling World Championships. He won the silver medal in the team sprint at the 2016 Asian Cycling Championships.
