= Amarjeet Singh Nagi =

Indian cyclist

Personal information
- Born: 26 March 1993 (age 33)

Cycling career
- Sport: Cycling
- Discipline: Track cycling
- Role: Rider
- Rider type: team sprint

Amarjeet Singh Nagi (born 26 March 1993) is an Indian male track cyclist. He competed in the team sprint event at the 2012 and 2013 UCI Track Cycling World Championships.
