= Yuriy Tsyupyk =

Ukrainian cyclist

Personal information
- Born: 15 July 1984 (age 42)

Cycling career
- Sport: Cycling
- Discipline: Track cycling
- Role: Rider
- Rider type: sprinter

Yuriy Tsyupyk (born 15 July 1984) is a Ukrainian male track cyclist, and part of the national team. He competed at the 2007, 2008 and 2009 UCI Track Cycling World Championships.
