= Athanasios Mantzouranis =

Greek cyclist

Personal information
- Full name: Athanasios Mantzouranis
- Nickname: Thanos
- Born: 11 April 1982 (age 44) Thessaloniki, Greece
- Height: 1.75 m (5 ft 9 in)
- Weight: 80 kg (176 lb)

Cycling career
- Sport: Cycling
- Discipline: Track
- Role: Rider
- Rider type: Sprinter

Athanasios Mantzouranis (Greek: Αθανάσιος Μαντζουράνης; born 11 April 1982) is a retired Greek amateur track cyclist. He has won multiple titles in track time trial (kilo), sprint (individual and team), and Keirin at the Greek Championships since 1999, and later represented his nation Greece at the 2008 Summer Olympics.

Mantzouranis qualified for the Greek squad in two track cycling events at the 2008 Summer Olympics in Beijing by receiving a berth for his team based on the nation's selection process from the UCI Track World Rankings. Teaming with Vasileios Reppas and Panagiotis Voukelatos in the men's sprint race, held on the first day of track cycling, Mantzouranis recorded a time of 45.645 and a speed of 59.152 km/h to deliver the Greek trio a tenth-place finish in the prelims. The following day, in men's keirin, Mantzouranis missed a chance to advance further to the later rounds, after finishing fifth in the opening prelims, third in the repechage, and seventeenth overall from the final standings.

== Career highlights ==
1998

- (gold) Greek Championships (500 m time trial), Novices (GRE)
- (gold) Greek Championships (Sprint), Novices (GRE)
- (silver) Greek Championships (Pursuit), Novices (GRE)

1999

- (gold) Athens Open Balkan Championships (Team sprint), Sofia (BUL)
- (gold) Greek Junior Championships (Sprint), Greece
- (gold) Greek Junior Championships (Team sprint), Greece
- (bronze) Athens Open Balkan Championships (Sprint), Sofia (BUL)

2000

- (gold) Greek Junior Championships (1 km time trial), Greece
- (gold) Greek Junior Championships (Sprint), Greece
- (gold) Greek Junior Championships (Team sprint), Greece

2001

- (gold) Greek Championships (Sprint), Greece
- (silver) Greek Championships (Team sprint), Greece
- (bronze) Greek Championships (1 km time trial), Greece

2002

- (gold) Greek Championships (1 km time trial), Greece

2004

- (gold) Athens Open Balkan Championships (1 km time trial), Athens (GRE)
- (gold) Greek Championships (Keirin), Athens (GRE)
- (silver) Greek Championships (1 km time trial), Athens (GRE)
- (bronze) Athens Open Balkan Championships (Team sprint), Athens (GRE)

2005

- (silver) Greek Championships (1 km time trial), Greece
- (silver) Greek Championships (Team sprint), Greece
- (bronze) Greek Road Championships (TTTl), Thiva (GRE)

2006

- (gold) Greek Championships (1 km time trial), Greece
- (gold) Greek Championships (Keirin), Greece
- (gold) Greek Championships (Sprint), Greece

2007

- (gold) Athens Open Balkan Championships (Sprint), Athens (GRE)
- (gold) Athens Open Balkan Championships (Team sprint with Christos Volikakis and Panagiotis Voukelatos), Athens (GRE)
- (gold) Greek Championships (1 km time trial), Greece
- (silver) Athens Open Balkan Championships (Keirin), Athens (GRE)
- (silver) Greek Championships (Team pursuit), Greece
- (bronze) Greek Championships (Team sprint), Greece

2008

- 10th Olympic Games (Team sprint with Vasileios Reppas and Panagiotis Voukelatos), Beijing (CHN)
- 17th Olympic Games (Keirin), Beijing (CHN)
