= Mohd Edrus Yunus =

Malaysian cyclist

Personal information
- Full name: Muhammad Edrus Muhammad Yunos
- Born: 19 July 1987 (age 39)

Cycling career
- Sport: Cycling
- Discipline: Track cycling
- Role: Rider
- Rider type: sprinter

Muhammad Edrus Muhammad Yunos (born 19 July 1987) is a Malaysian male track cyclist. He competed in the two events at the 2011 UCI Track Cycling World Championships and in the three events at the 2012 UCI Track Cycling World Championships.
