= Feng Yong =

Chinese educator, military leader and politician (1901–1981)

- 馮庸
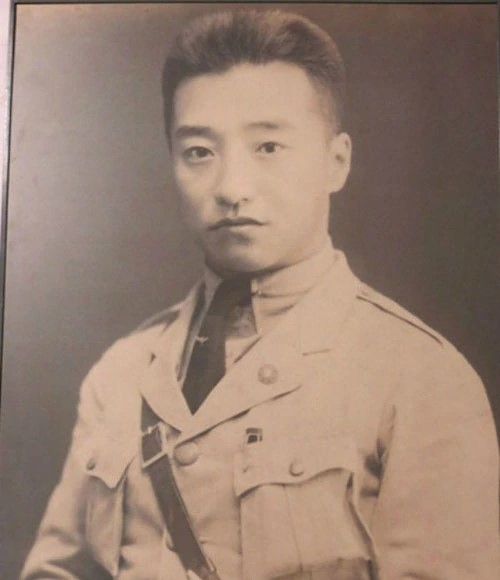
- Born: 5 February 1901; Taian, Liaoning, Qing Empire
- Died: 5 February 1981 (aged 79–80); Taipei, Taiwan
- Children: 5
- Military career
- Allegiance: Republic of China
- Branch: National Revolutionary Army
- Conflicts: Sino-Soviet conflict; Xi'an Incident; Mukden Incident

Feng Yong (Chinese: 馮庸; 1901–1981) was a Chinese educator, military leader and politician. The eldest son of the warlord Feng Delin, Feng Yong was a member of the Standing Committee of the Northeast Administrative Committee. Feng and Zhang Xueliang were born in the same year and grew up together. Theirs fathers were both strong warlords. Zhang Xueliang would become the “Young Marshal”, while Feng chose to set up a Western-style university in China.

In 1926, after the death of Feng Delin, Feng Yong continued his father's post as a military officer. Later, he joined the Republic of China Air Force and his military rank was in the ranks of Lieutenant General. And he took out almost all of his money and started to establish Fengyong University. During the Mukden Incident, he was arrested by the Japanese troops and they took him to Tokyo. After escaping, he organized the volunteer army of Fengyong University and participated in the "1-28" Anti-Japanese War. After the war, he returned to Shenyang to serve as the member of Standing Committee of the Northeast Administrative Committee. After 1949, he served as mayor of Taipei, director of the bureau of state assets, and commander of the port of Kaohsiung. He died in Taipei on February 5, 1981.

== Biography ==
In 1920, after Feng graduated from the Beijing Army school, he began to serve in the Northeast Army.

As a result of family background and social impact, Feng served in the army very early in his life, and he repeatedly promoted to higher positions, however, his goal was not here. He had a lot of contact with the people and felt that people's lives were extremely hard. When the first war broke out in his hometown, Feng, who was in it, deeply regretted for the people affected by the terrible war. In Feng's opinion, domestic worries and foreign invasion in China were frequent, and the national power of this country was gradually declining. He argued that the main trouble of China was the backward industry. In order to transform this chaotic society, it is necessary to develop the national industry, train a great many of industrial talents, and take the road of saving the country through industry and education.

In 1926, after his father died of illness, Feng retired from the military (and retained his rank) to prepare for setting up the school. Feng Delin, as an early general warlord, accumulated a huge family assets in more than 20 years. Feng Yong summoned debtors and burned bonds in public. He also called together those who pledge the land, and he returned the title deed in public. And finally, he reconvened the family to announce that he would donate all the assets of 3.1 million silver dollars to establish Fengyong University.

In the spring of 1927, Fengyong University began construction. In just around four months, the Fengyong University was established as the campus buildings that had a unique layout which contained more than 200 classrooms, offices, and dormitories. Then in less than a month of time, a new type of private university - Fengyong University established in the northeast of China, and all buildings completed on October 1, with "a total of recruit students in five classes that contained more than 180 individuals”. The university opened on October 10.

On September 21, 1931, the Japanese army rushed into Fengyong University and arrested Feng. He was detained in a Shenyang hotel before being transferred to Tokyo. With the help of a Japanese friend, Feng escaped and went to Beiping via Shanghai, and continued to run Fengyong University in Beiping. On November 1, 1931, the anti-Japanese volunteers group of Fengyong University was established.

After the victory of the Sino-Japanese War, Feng returned to Shenyang from Chongqing, and he served as the Standing Member of the Administrative Committee of the Northeast Army.

Feng moved to Taiwan with the Nationalist Party in 1949 and remained in a key position of air force. Soon after, he was unfortunately implicated in an accident of the Taiwan air force's accidental struck on a U.S. diplomat's private jet, and then he was demobilised and changed to another post as a consultant to Taiwan Power Company until his death in 1981.

In 1981, Feng died of illness in Taipei at the age of 81.

== Marriages ==
Feng's first wife Jiang Jintao was the daughter of Jiang Chaozong, who served as the admiral of the Nine Gates during the late Qing Dynasty and shortly served as the acting premier of the State Council. It was an arranged marriage, which lasted about ten years and produced two daughters. After divorcing Jiang, Feng married his second wife Long Wenbin, who was a student with PE specialty at Fengyong University. After the Mukden Incident, Fengyong University was occupied by the Japanese, and Long followed Feng to Peiping. Feng married Long Wenbin in 1933. They divorced after moving to Taiwan.

== Fengyong University ==
Fengyong University, founded by Yong Feng at his own expense on August 8, 1927, and he was the headmaster and training director of the university. The university was not only the first Western-style university in China, but also completely free for all the students, thus, Yong Feng's righteousness was quite admired by the people in Northeast China. Fengyong University was the first university in the Republic of China that had military teaching aircraft and airports. The university was divided into departments of engineering, departments of law, and departments of education, with a total student population of more than 700. The main buildings were “Zhong” building, “Ren” building and “Zhong Yong” building. And the three buildings were connected by corridors. According to Feng's nephew Zhang Wenqi's introduction, Feng Yong's mission was to “create the young generation in New China”, that was, to cultivate the new generation of young individuals with new ideas and traditions of defending and building the country. There were three significant thoughts on Yong Feng's education: firstly, "eight virtues and eight positives", which contained that filial piety, loyalty, faith, courtesy, righteousness, honesty, and positive thinking; the second one was equal educational opportunities; the third one was "utilizing industrial to save the country”. Moreover, Yong Feng stipulated that every student not only needed to take the courses in the classroom, but also must be trained in military training and exercise every day for one hour. Even in the case of severe winter, in order to enhance their physical fitness and to cultivate their spirit of hard working, students needed to work hard and do all the military training and exercises. At that time, people in Shenyang compared Fengyong University with the two military camps, called East camp and north camp, and individuals would call the school as “Western camp".

After the "Mukden Incident", the normal order of Fengyong University was seriously damaged. On September 21, 1931, the Japanese army rushed into Fengyong University and arrested the head master Yong Feng, and they also ransacked the classrooms and dormitories. That night, most of the teachers and students of Fengyong University took a bus to Peiping. And Zhang Xueliang used the former army university building at Peiping to house the students and teachers. After the Japanese army occupied Fengyong University, they transformed the school into an airfield for aircraft repair and flight testing.

== Bureaucratic career ==
In his early years, Feng served as commander of the northeast air force and commander of armored vehicles. He served successively as captain staff officer, major staff officer, lieutenant colonel's staff officer, the commander of general aviation, and the commander of armored force, etc. . Later, he served successively as the commander of the third martial army in Kunshan, and lieutenant general of the ninth PLA, etc. . Before the Xi’an Incident, he served as chairman of the military commission of the national government, and was also a research member of the military commission of the national government. He went to Xi’an and asked the “Young Marshal” Zhang Xueliang to be a division commander. But Zhang Xueliang only promised him a brigadier. During this period of time, Zhang poured out his frustration and dissatisfaction of Chiang Kai-shek to Feng Yong. In order to assuage the relationship of Chiang Kai-shek and Zhang Xueliang, Yong Feng utilized his friendship with Chen Cheng to help Zhang to reflect his situation and difficulties to Chiang Kai-shek. However, as these situation conveyed by Chen cheng to Chiang Kai-shek, it turned into disclosures and charges of Zhang Xueliang, so that Chiang Kai-shek later became very trust in Feng Yong. As a result, he remained in high position after the Xi’an Incident. During the Sino-Japanese War, he served successively as the commander of police and garrison headquarters in Kunshan, Changxing and Xiangfan. After 1949, he served as mayor of Taipei, director of the bureau of state assets and commander of the port of Kaohsiung.

== In popular culture ==
- A Chinese TV series titled Young Marshal is based on the story between Zhang Xueliang and Feng Yong.

== See also ==
- Warlord era
- History of the Republic of China
- Military of the Republic of China
- Politics of the Republic of China
