= Seiichiro Nakagawa =

Japanese cyclist

Seiichiro Nakagawa (中川 誠一郎, Nakagawa Seiichirō; born 7 June 1979) is a Japanese track cyclist. At the 2012 Summer Olympics, he competed in the Men's sprint.
