= Amrit Singh =

Indian cyclist

Personal information
- Born: 1 October 1991 (age 35) Patiala, Punjab, India

Cycling career
- Sport: Cycling
- Discipline: Track cycling
- Role: Rider
- Rider type: team sprint

Major wins
- Father: Dev Karaiwala

Amrit Singh (born 1 October 1991) is an Indian male track cyclist. He competed in the team sprint event at the 2012 and 2013 UCI Track Cycling World Championships.
