= Yevgen Bolibrukh =

Ukrainian cyclist (born 1983)

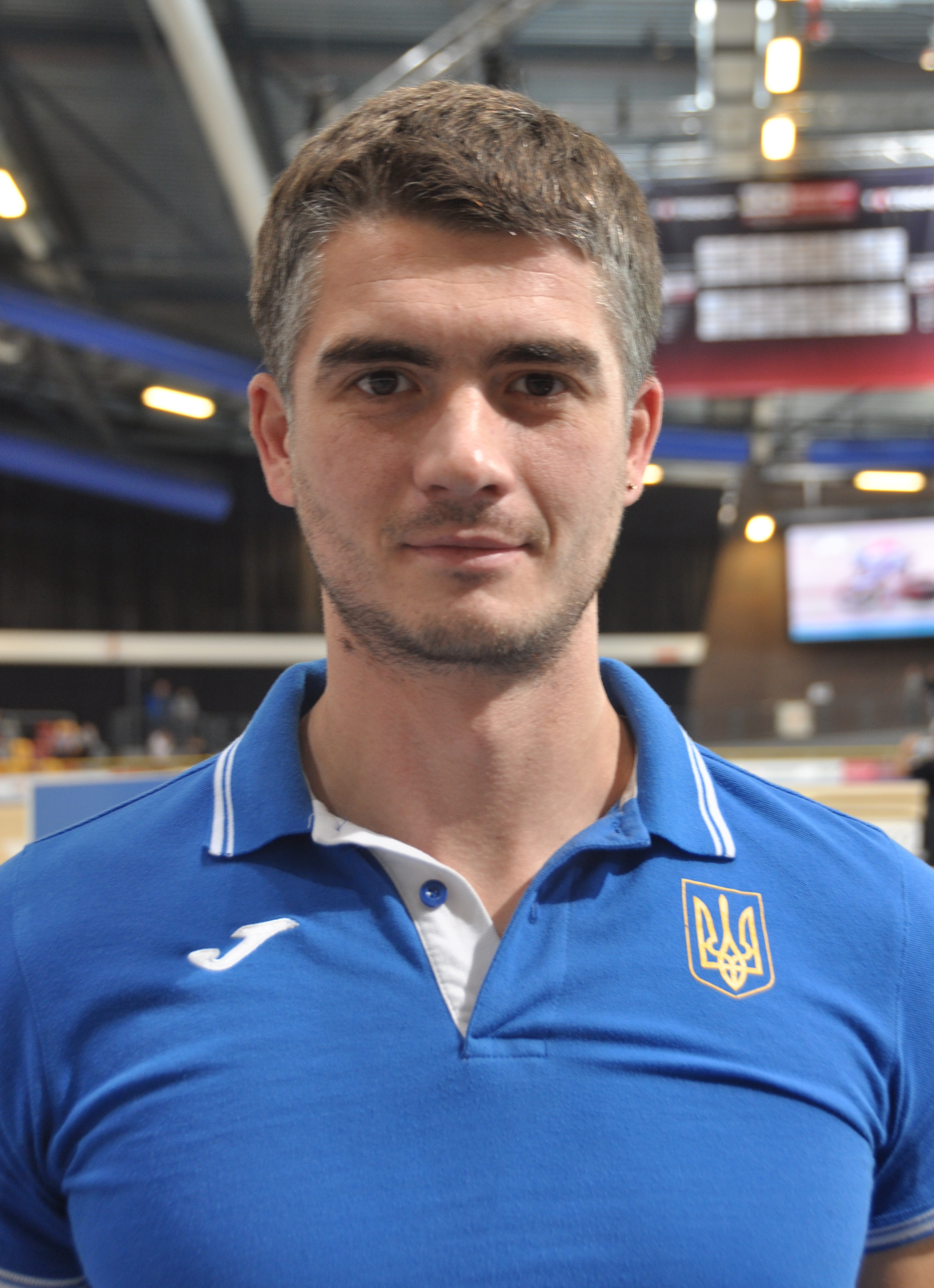
- Yevgen Bolibrukh (2016)

Personal information
- Born: 15 August 1983 (age 43)

Cycling career
- Sport: Cycling
- Discipline: Racing
- Role: Rider

Yevgen Bolibrukh (born August 15, 1983) is a Ukrainian professional racing cyclist.

== Career highlights ==
1. 2006: 3rd in Moscow, 1 km (RUS)
2. 2007: 3rd in Sydney, 1 km (AUS)
3. 2007: 2nd in Beijing, 1 km (CHN)
4. 2008: 2nd in Los Angeles, 1 km (USA)
