= Kazunari Watanabe =

Japanese cyclist (born 1983)

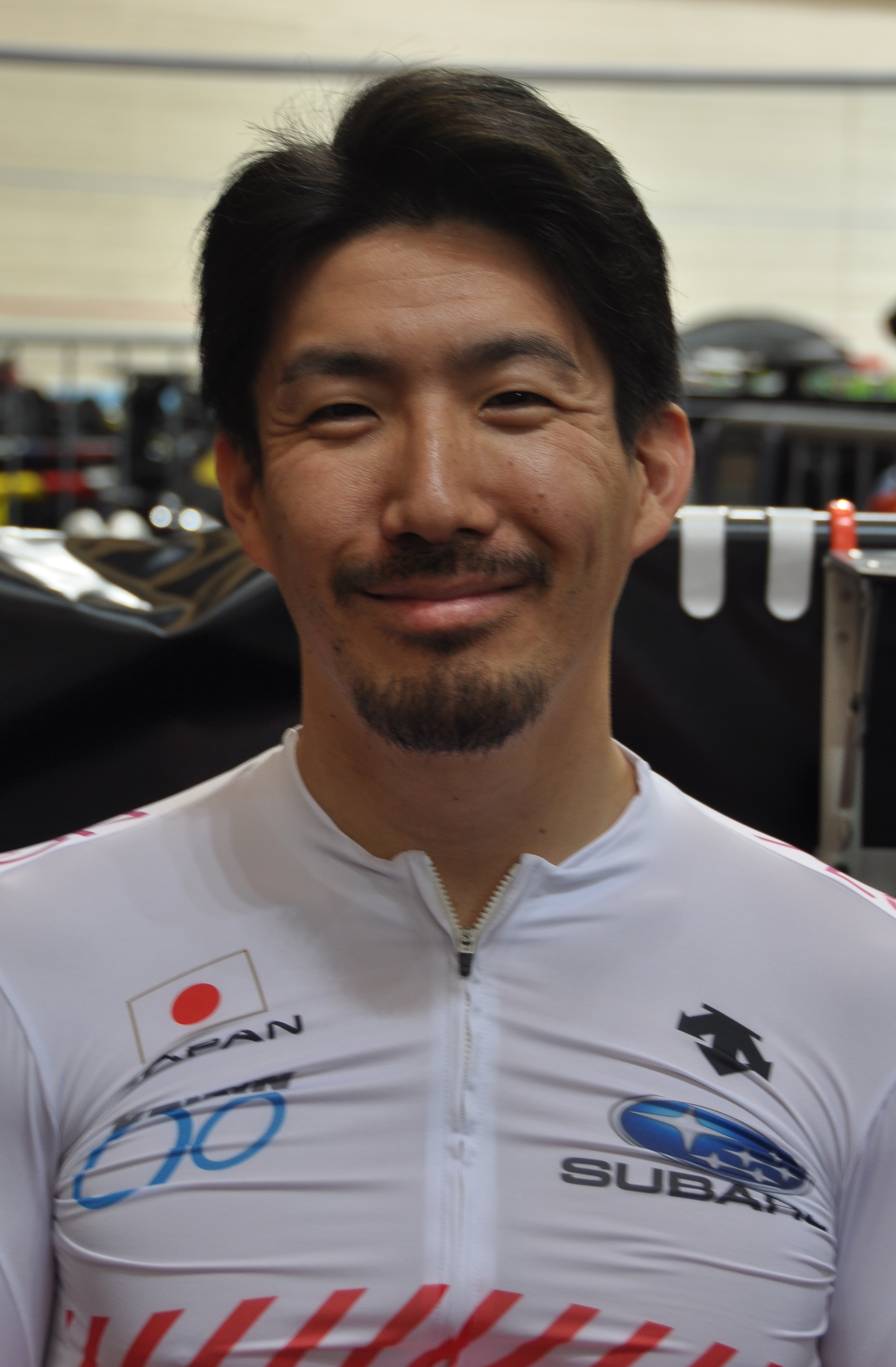
- Kazunari Watanabe (2018)

Personal information
- Full name: Kazunari Watanabe 渡邉一成
- Born: 12 August 1983 (age 43) Futaba, Fukushima, Japan

Cycling career
- Sport: Cycling
- Discipline: Track
- Role: Rider
- Rider type: Sprinter
Medal record
Men's track cycling
Representing Japan
Asian Championships
Gold medal – first place	2019 Jakarta	Team sprint

Kazunari Watanabe (渡邉一成, Watanabe Kazunari; born 12 August 1983) is a Japanese cyclist.

Watanabe has competed in the keirin and other track events at the 2008 Summer Olympics and 2012 Summer Olympics in London. He also competes in Japanese professional keirin cycling competitions.
