= 2024 UCI Track Cycling season =

Nineteenth season of UCI Track Cycling Season

Details
- Dates: 4 January – December 2024

The 2024 UCI Track Cycling season was the nineteenth season of the UCI Track Cycling Season. The 2024 season began on 4 January with the French and Canadian Track Cycling Championships and ended in December. It was organised by the Union Cycliste Internationale.

== Events ==
Event	Race	Winner	Second	Third	Ref
CAC Track African Championships; Egypt 10–14 January 2024 CC
CAC Track African Championships; Egypt 10–14 January 2024 CC	Elimination Race	(Algeria) Yacine Chalel	(Algeria) Hamza Megnouche	(Egypt) Youssef Abou el-Hassan	
CAC Track African Championships; Egypt 10–14 January 2024 CC	Elimination Race	(Egypt) Ebtissam Mohamed	(South Africa) S'Annara Grove	(Algeria) Nesrine Houili	
CAC Track African Championships; Egypt 10–14 January 2024 CC	Individual Pursuit	(Egypt) Mahmoud Bakr	(Algeria) Lotfi Tchambaz	(Algeria) Salah Cherki	
CAC Track African Championships; Egypt 10–14 January 2024 CC	Individual Pursuit	(South Africa) S'Annara Grove	(Algeria) Nesrine Houili	(South Africa) Danielle Van Niekerk	
CAC Track African Championships; Egypt 10–14 January 2024 CC	Keirin	(South Africa) Jean Spies	(South Africa) Mitchell Sparrow	(Algeria) Mohamed-Nadjib Assal	
CAC Track African Championships; Egypt 10–14 January 2024 CC	Keirin	(South Africa) Ainslii de Beer	(South Africa) S'Annara Grove	(Nigeria) Gripa Tombrapa	
CAC Track African Championships; Egypt 10–14 January 2024 CC	Omnium	(Egypt) Mahmoud Bakr	(South Africa) Daniyal Mathews	(Algeria) Lotfi Tchambaz	
CAC Track African Championships; Egypt 10–14 January 2024 CC	Omnium	(Egypt) Ebtissam Mohamed	(South Africa) S'Annara Grove	(South Africa) Danielle Van Niekerk	
CAC Track African Championships; Egypt 10–14 January 2024 CC	Points Race	(Algeria) Mohamed-Nadjib Assal	(Algeria) Hamza Megnouche	(Egypt) Sayed Elkadia	
CAC Track African Championships; Egypt 10–14 January 2024 CC	Points Race	(Egypt) Ebtissam Mohamed	(South Africa) S'Annara Grove	(South Africa) Ainslii de Beer	
CAC Track African Championships; Egypt 10–14 January 2024 CC	Scratch	(Egypt) Mahmoud Bakr	(Algeria) Zaki Boudar	(Egypt) Youssef Abou el-Hassan	
CAC Track African Championships; Egypt 10–14 January 2024 CC	Scratch	(Egypt) Ebtissam Mohamed	(South Africa) Danielle Van Niekerk	(Nigeria) Gripa Tombrapa	
CAC Track African Championships; Egypt 10–14 January 2024 CC	Sprint	(South Africa) Jean Spies	(South Africa) Mitchell Sparrow	(Egypt) Hussein Emad Hassan	
CAC Track African Championships; Egypt 10–14 January 2024 CC	Sprint	(Egypt) Shahd Mohamed	(Nigeria) Gripa Tombrapa	(Nigeria) Tawakalt Yekeen	
CAC Track African Championships; Egypt 10–14 January 2024 CC	Time Trial	(South Africa) Johannes Myburgh	(Algeria) El Khacib Sassane	(Egypt) Hussein Emad Hassan	
CAC Track African Championships; Egypt 10–14 January 2024 CC	Time Trial	(Egypt) Shahd Mohamed	(Nigeria) Grace Ayuba	(Algeria) Nesrine Houili	
CAC Track African Championships; Egypt 10–14 January 2024 CC	Madison	(Algeria) Mohamed-Nadjib Assal (Algeria) Salah Cherki	(Egypt) Youssef Abou el-Hassan (Egypt) Mahmoud Bakr	(Algeria) Lotfi Tchambaz (Algeria) Zaki Boudar	
CAC Track African Championships; Egypt 10–14 January 2024 CC	Madison	(South Africa) S'Annara Grove (South Africa) Danielle Van Niekerk	(Egypt) Ebtissam Mohamed (Egypt) Nada Aboubalash	(Egypt) Mentalla Belal (Egypt) Aya Mohamed	
CAC Track African Championships; Egypt 10–14 January 2024 CC	Team Sprint	(South Africa) Jean Spies (South Africa) Johannes Myburgh (South Africa) Mitchell Sparrow	(Egypt) Sayed Elkadia (Egypt) Hussein Emad Hassan (Egypt) Mahmoud Elimbabi	(Algeria) El Khacib Sassane (Algeria) Mohamed-Nadjib Assal (Algeria) Zaki Boudar	
CAC Track African Championships; Egypt 10–14 January 2024 CC	Team Sprint	(Egypt) Ebtissam Mohamed (Egypt) Nada Aboubalash (Egypt) Shahd Mohamed	(Nigeria) Tawakalt Yekeen (Nigeria) Gripa Tombrapa (Nigeria) Grace Ayuba		
CAC Track African Championships; Egypt 10–14 January 2024 CC	Team Pursuit	(Algeria) Lotfi Tchambaz (Algeria) El Khacib Sassane (Algeria) Yacine Chalel (Algeria) Salah Cherki	(Egypt) Youssef Abou el-Hassan (Egypt) Mahmoud Bakr (Egypt) Sayed Elkadia (Egypt) Omar Elsaid		
CAC Track African Championships; Egypt 10–14 January 2024 CC	Team Pursuit	(Egypt) Ebtissam Mohamed (Egypt) Nada Aboubalash (Egypt) Rehab Elsherbini (Egypt) Aya Mohamed	(Nigeria) Tawakalt Yekeen (Nigeria) Gripa Tombrapa (Nigeria) Grace Ayuba (Nigeria) Patience Otuodung		
2024 UEC European Track Championships; Egypt 10–14 January 2024 CC
2024 UEC European Track Championships; Egypt 10–14 January 2024 CC	Elimination Race	(Denmark) Tobias Hansen	(United Kingdom) William Tidball	(Belgium) Jules Hesters	
2024 UEC European Track Championships; Egypt 10–14 January 2024 CC	Elimination Race	(Belgium) Lotte Kopecky	(Germany) Lea Lin Teutenberg	(United Kingdom) Jessica Roberts	
2024 UEC European Track Championships; Egypt 10–14 January 2024 CC	Individual Pursuit	(United Kingdom) Daniel Bigham	(United Kingdom) Charlie Tanfield	(Denmark) Rasmus Pedersen	
2024 UEC European Track Championships; Egypt 10–14 January 2024 CC	Individual Pursuit	(United Kingdom) Josie Knight	(Germany) Franziska Brauße	(United Kingdom) Anna Morris	
2024 UEC European Track Championships; Egypt 10–14 January 2024 CC	Keirin	(Netherlands) Harrie Lavreysen	(Poland) Mateusz Rudyk	(Italy) Stefano Moro	
2024 UEC European Track Championships; Egypt 10–14 January 2024 CC	Keirin	(Germany) Lea Friedrich	(United Kingdom) Emma Finucane	(Netherlands) Hetty van de Wouw	
2024 UEC European Track Championships; Egypt 10–14 January 2024 CC	Omnium	(United Kingdom) Ethan Hayter	(Denmark) Niklas Larsen	(Belgium) Fabio Van den Bossche	
2024 UEC European Track Championships; Egypt 10–14 January 2024 CC	Omnium	(Norway) Anita Stenberg	(United Kingdom) Neah Evans	(France) Valentine Fortin	
2024 UEC European Track Championships; Egypt 10–14 January 2024 CC	Points Race	(Denmark) Niklas Larsen	(Spain) Sebastián Mora	(France) Oscar Nilsson-Julien	
2024 UEC European Track Championships; Egypt 10–14 January 2024 CC	Points Race	(Belgium) Lotte Kopecky	(Norway) Anita Stenberg	(Czech Republic) Jarmila Machačová	
2024 UEC European Track Championships; Egypt 10–14 January 2024 CC	Scratch	(Portugal) Iúri Leitão	(Austria) Tim Wafler	(Denmark) Tobias Hansen	
2024 UEC European Track Championships; Egypt 10–14 January 2024 CC	Scratch	(France) Clara Copponi	(Belgium) Lani Wittevrongel	(Italy) Martina Fidanza	
2024 UEC European Track Championships; Egypt 10–14 January 2024 CC	Sprint	(Netherlands) Harrie Lavreysen	(Poland) Mateusz Rudyk	(Israel) Mikhail Iakovlev	
2024 UEC European Track Championships; Egypt 10–14 January 2024 CC	Sprint	(United Kingdom) Emma Finucane	(Germany) Lea Friedrich	(Germany) Emma Hinze	
2024 UEC European Track Championships; Egypt 10–14 January 2024 CC	Time Trial	(Italy) Matteo Bianchi	(Netherlands) Daan Kool	(France) Melvin Landerneau	
2024 UEC European Track Championships; Egypt 10–14 January 2024 CC	Time Trial	(United Kingdom) Katy Marchant	(France) Taky Marie-Divine Kouamé	(Germany) Pauline Grabosch	
2024 UEC European Track Championships; Egypt 10–14 January 2024 CC	Madison	(Germany) Roger Kluge (Germany) Theo Reinhardt	(France) Thomas Boudat (France) Donavan Grondin	(Denmark) Michael Mørkøv (Denmark) Theodor Storm	
2024 UEC European Track Championships; Egypt 10–14 January 2024 CC	Madison	(France) Valentine Fortin (France) Marion Borras	(Belgium) Katrijn De Clercq (Belgium) Lotte Kopecky	(Italy) Elisa Balsamo (Italy) Vittoria Guazzini	
2024 UEC European Track Championships; Egypt 10–14 January 2024 CC	Team Sprint	(Netherlands) Roy van den Berg (Netherlands) Harrie Lavreysen (Netherlands) Jeffrey Hoogland	(France) Florian Grengbo (France) Sébastien Vigier (France) Rayan Helal	(Poland) Rafał Sarnecki (Poland) Daniel Rochna (Poland) Mateusz Rudyk	
2024 UEC European Track Championships; Egypt 10–14 January 2024 CC	Team Sprint	(Germany) Lea Friedrich (Germany) Pauline Grabosch (Germany) Emma Hinze	(United Kingdom) Emma Finucane (United Kingdom) Katy Marchant (United Kingdom) Sophie Capewell	(Netherlands) Steffie van der Peet (Netherlands) Kyra Lamberink (Netherlands) Hetty van de Wouw	
2024 UEC European Track Championships; Egypt 10–14 January 2024 CC	Team Pursuit	(United Kingdom) Daniel Bigham (United Kingdom) Ethan Hayter (United Kingdom) Charlie Tanfield (United Kingdom) Ethan Vernon	(Denmark) Carl-Frederik Bévort (Denmark) Tobias Hansen (Denmark) Niklas Larsen (Denmark) Rasmus Pedersen	(Italy) Davide Boscaro (Italy) Simone Consonni (Italy) Francesco Lamon (Italy) Jonathan Milan	
2024 UEC European Track Championships; Egypt 10–14 January 2024 CC	Team Pursuit	(Italy) Elisa Balsamo (Italy) Martina Fidanza (Italy) Vittoria Guazzini (Italy) Letizia Paternoster	(United Kingdom) Megan Barker (United Kingdom) Josie Knight (United Kingdom) Anna Morris (United Kingdom) Jessica Roberts	(Germany) Franziska Brauße (Germany) Lisa Klein (Germany) Lena Reißner (Germany) Laura Süßemilch	
Six Days of Bremen; Germany 12–15 January 2024 CL2
Six Days of Bremen; Germany 12–15 January 2024 CL2	Madison	(Germany) Roger Kluge (Germany) Theo Reinhardt	(Netherlands) Yoeri Havik (Netherlands) Jan-Willem van Schip	(Germany) Nils Politt (Belgium) Lindsay De Vylder	
Six Days of Bremen; Germany 12–15 January 2024 CL2	Madison	(Germany) Lea Lin Teutenberg (Germany) Franziska Brauße	(United Kingdom) Lucy Nelson (Norway) Nora Tveit	(Switzerland) Léna Mettraux (Switzerland) Cybèle Schneider	
Six Days of Bremen; Germany 12–15 January 2024 CL2	Sprint	(Germany) Robert Förstemann	(Germany) Kenneth Meng	(United Kingdom) Matt Rotherham	
Six Days of Bremen; Germany 12–15 January 2024 CL2	Sprint	(Germany) Alessa-Catriona Pröpster	(Germany) Lara-Sophie Jäger	(United Kingdom) Rhian Edmunds	
Six Days of Berlin; Germany 26–27 January 2024 CL1
Six Days of Berlin; Germany 26–27 January 2024 CL1	Men's Madison	(Netherlands) Jan-Willem van Schip (Netherlands) Yoeri Havik	(Germany) Roger Kluge (Germany) Theo Reinhardt	(Germany) Moritz Malcharek (Germany) Moritz Augenstein	
Six Days of Berlin; Germany 26–27 January 2024 CL1	Men's Sprint	(Poland) Mateusz Rudyk	(Germany) Robert Förstemann	(Netherlands) Roy van den Berg	
2024 UCI Track Cycling Nations Cup I Australia 2–4 February 2024 CDN
2024 UCI Track Cycling Nations Cup I Australia 2–4 February 2024 CDN	Elimination Race	(Canada) Dylan Bibic	(Australia) Blake Agnoletto	(United States) Grant Koontz	
2024 UCI Track Cycling Nations Cup I Australia 2–4 February 2024 CDN	Elimination Race	(New Zealand) Ally Wollaston	(United States) Jennifer Valente	(United Kingdom) Jessica Roberts	
2024 UCI Track Cycling Nations Cup I Australia 2–4 February 2024 CDN	Keirin	(Malaysia) Azizulhasni Awang	(Japan) Shinji Nakano	(Japan) Kaiya Ota	
2024 UCI Track Cycling Nations Cup I Australia 2–4 February 2024 CDN	Keirin	(Japan) Mina Sato	(United Kingdom) Katy Marchant	(Canada) Lauriane Genest	
2024 UCI Track Cycling Nations Cup I Australia 2–4 February 2024 CDN	Omnium	(Canada) Dylan Bibic	(Italy) Elia Viviani	(Belgium) Lindsay De Vylder	
2024 UCI Track Cycling Nations Cup I Australia 2–4 February 2024 CDN	Omnium	(New Zealand) Ally Wollaston	(United Kingdom) Katie Archibald	(United States) Jennifer Valente	
2024 UCI Track Cycling Nations Cup I Australia 2–4 February 2024 CDN	Sprint	(Japan) Kaiya Ota	(Australia) Matthew Richardson	(Australia) Matthew Glaetzer	
2024 UCI Track Cycling Nations Cup I Australia 2–4 February 2024 CDN	Sprint	(Germany) Emma Hinze	(Japan) Mina Sato	(France) Mathilde Gros	
2024 UCI Track Cycling Nations Cup I Australia 2–4 February 2024 CDN	Madison	(New Zealand) Aaron Gate (New Zealand) Campbell Stewart	(Germany) Roger Kluge (Germany) Theo Reinhardt	(United Kingdom) Josh Tarling (United Kingdom) Oliver Wood	
2024 UCI Track Cycling Nations Cup I Australia 2–4 February 2024 CDN	Madison	(United Kingdom) Katie Archibald (United Kingdom) Elinor Barker	(Australia) Georgia Baker (Australia) Alexandra Manly	(United States) Jennifer Valente (United States) Lily Williams	
2024 UCI Track Cycling Nations Cup I Australia 2–4 February 2024 CDN	Team Pursuit	(United Kingdom) Josh Tarling (United Kingdom) William Tidball (United Kingdom) Rhys Britton (United Kingdom) Charlie Tanfield	(Australia) Conor Leahy (Australia) James Moriarty (Australia) Kelland O'Brien (Australia) Sam Welsford	(Italy) Francesco Lamon (Italy) Elia Viviani (Italy) Davide Boscaro (Italy) Filippo Ganna	
2024 UCI Track Cycling Nations Cup I Australia 2–4 February 2024 CDN	Team Pursuit	(New Zealand) Bryony Botha (New Zealand) Ally Wollaston (New Zealand) Samantha Donnelly (New Zealand) Emily Shearman	(United Kingdom) Katie Archibald (United Kingdom) Elinor Barker (United Kingdom) Josie Knight (United Kingdom) Anna Morris	(Australia) Georgia Baker (Australia) Alexandra Manly (Australia) Sophie Edwards (Australia) Chloe Moran	
2024 UCI Track Cycling Nations Cup I Australia 2–4 February 2024 CDN	Team Sprint	(Australia) Matthew Glaetzer (Australia) Leigh Hoffman (Australia) Matthew Richardson	(Japan) Yoshitaku Nagasako (Japan) Yuta Obara (Japan) Kaiya Ota	(United Kingdom) Jack Carlin (United Kingdom) Ed Lowe (United Kingdom) Hamish Turnbull	
2024 UCI Track Cycling Nations Cup I Australia 2–4 February 2024 CDN	Team Sprint	(United Kingdom) Sophie Capewell (United Kingdom) Emma Finucane (United Kingdom) Katy Marchant	(China) Bao Shanju (China) Guo Yufang (China) Yuan Liying	(New Zealand) Ellesse Andrews (New Zealand) Shaane Fulton (New Zealand) Rebecca Petch	
2024 Oceania Track Championships; New Zealand 14–18 February 2024 CC
2024 Oceania Track Championships; New Zealand 14–18 February 2024 CC	Elimination Race	(New Zealand) Aaron Gate	(Australia) Graeme Frislie	(New Zealand) Joel Douglas	
2024 Oceania Track Championships; New Zealand 14–18 February 2024 CC	Elimination Race	(New Zealand) Ally Wollaston	(New Zealand) Bryony Botha	(Australia) Keira Will	
2024 Oceania Track Championships; New Zealand 14–18 February 2024 CC	Individual Pursuit	(New Zealand) Aaron Gate	(New Zealand) Marshall Erwood	(Australia) John Carter	
2024 Oceania Track Championships; New Zealand 14–18 February 2024 CC	Individual Pursuit	(New Zealand) Bryony Botha	(New Zealand) Emily Shearman	(New Zealand) Nicole Shields	
2024 Oceania Track Championships; New Zealand 14–18 February 2024 CC	Points Race	(New Zealand) Aaron Gate	(New Zealand) George Jackson	(New Zealand) Keegan Hornblow	
2024 Oceania Track Championships; New Zealand 14–18 February 2024 CC	Points Race	(New Zealand) Ally Wollaston	(New Zealand) Michaela Drummond	(New Zealand) Emily Shearman	
2024 Oceania Track Championships; New Zealand 14–18 February 2024 CC	Scratch	(Australia) Kelland O'Brien	(New Zealand) George Jackson	(New Zealand) Marshall Erwood	
2024 Oceania Track Championships; New Zealand 14–18 February 2024 CC	Scratch	(New Zealand) Ally Wollaston	(New Zealand) Emily Shearman	(Australia) Sally Carter	
2024 Oceania Track Championships; New Zealand 14–18 February 2024 CC	Sprint	(Australia) Matthew Richardson	(Australia) Leigh Hoffman	(New Zealand) Sam Dakin	
2024 Oceania Track Championships; New Zealand 14–18 February 2024 CC	Sprint	(Australia) Kristina Clonan	(New Zealand) Shaane Fulton	(Australia) Alessia McCaig	
2024 Oceania Track Championships; New Zealand 14–18 February 2024 CC	Time Trial	(Australia) Thomas Cornish	(Australia) Byron Davies	(New Zealand) Nick Kergozou	
2024 Oceania Track Championships; New Zealand 14–18 February 2024 CC	Time Trial	(Australia) Kristina Clonan	(New Zealand) Shaane Fulton	(Australia) Alessia McCaig	
2024 Oceania Track Championships; New Zealand 14–18 February 2024 CC	Madison	(New Zealand) Aaron Gate (New Zealand) Tom Sexton	(New Zealand) George Jackson (New Zealand) Bailey O'Donnell	(New Zealand) Joel Douglas (New Zealand) Keegan Hornblow	
2024 Oceania Track Championships; New Zealand 14–18 February 2024 CC	Madison	(New Zealand) Bryony Botha (New Zealand) Michaela Drummond	(New Zealand) Samantha Donnelly (New Zealand) Ally Wollaston	(Australia) Claudia Marcks (Australia) Keira Will	
2024 Oceania Track Championships; New Zealand 14–18 February 2024 CC	Team Pursuit	(New Zealand) Daniel Bridgwater (New Zealand) Keegan Hornblow (New Zealand) George Jackson (New Zealand) Tom Sexton	(Australia) John Carter (Australia) Graeme Frislie (Australia) Conor Leahy (Australia) Liam Walsh	(New Zealand) Kyle Aitken (New Zealand) Marshall Erwood (New Zealand) Nick Kergozou (New Zealand) Bailey O'Donnell (New Zealand) Joel Douglas	
2024 Oceania Track Championships; New Zealand 14–18 February 2024 CC	Team Pursuit	(New Zealand) Bryony Botha (New Zealand) Ally Wollaston (New Zealand) Michaela Drummond (New Zealand) Emily Shearman (New Zealand) Nicole Shields	(Australia) Sally Carter (Australia) Claudia Marcks (Australia) Sophie Marr (Australia) Keira Will	(New Zealand) Hannah Bayard (New Zealand) Belle Judd (New Zealand) Georgia Simpson (New Zealand) Bee Townsend	
2024 Oceania Track Championships; New Zealand 14–18 February 2024 CC	Team Sprint	(Australia) Daniel Barber (Australia) Byron Davies (Australia) Ryan Elliott	(New Zealand) Liam Cavanagh (New Zealand) Jaxson Russell (New Zealand) Patrick Clancy	(Australia) Finn Carpenter (Australia) Sam Gallagher (New Zealand) Maxwell Liebeknecht	
2024 Oceania Track Championships; New Zealand 14–18 February 2024 CC	Team Sprint	(Australia) Alessia McCaig (Australia) Molly McGill (Australia) Kalinda Robinson	(New Zealand) Sophie De Vries (New Zealand) Shaane Fulton (New Zealand) Rebecca Petch	(Australia) Deneaka Blinco (Australia) Tomasin Clark (New Zealand) Sophie Watts	
2024 Asian Track Cycling Championships; India 21–26 February 2024 CC
2024 Asian Track Cycling Championships; India 21–26 February 2024 CC	Elimination Race	(Japan) Shunsuke Imamura	(Uzbekistan) Nikita Tsvetkov	(Kazakhstan) Ramis Dinmukhametov	
2024 Asian Track Cycling Championships; India 21–26 February 2024 CC	Elimination Race	(Japan) Yumi Kajihara	(Hong Kong) Lee Sze Wing	(Chinese Taipei) Huang Ting-ying	
2024 Asian Track Cycling Championships; India 21–26 February 2024 CC	Individual Pursuit	(Japan) Shoi Matsuda	(United Arab Emirates) Mohammad al-Mutaiwei	(Hong Kong) Ng Pak-hang	
2024 Asian Track Cycling Championships; India 21–26 February 2024 CC	Individual Pursuit	(Japan) Maho Kakita	(China) Menghan Zhou	(Kazakhstan) Rinata Sultanova	
2024 Asian Track Cycling Championships; India 21–26 February 2024 CC	Keirin	(Japan) Kento Yamasaki	(China) Zhiwei Li	(Hong Kong) Yung Tsun Ho	
2024 Asian Track Cycling Championships; India 21–26 February 2024 CC	Keirin	(Malaysia) Nurul Izzah	(China) Mengqi Tong	(Malaysia) Anis Amira Rosidi	
2024 Asian Track Cycling Championships; India 21–26 February 2024 CC	Omnium	(Japan) Eiya Hashimoto	(Indonesia) Bernard Van Aert	(Hong Kong) Kai Kwong Tso	
2024 Asian Track Cycling Championships; India 21–26 February 2024 CC	Omnium	(Japan) Yumi Kajihara	(China) Liu Jiali	(Hong Kong) Lee Sze Wing	
2024 Asian Track Cycling Championships; India 21–26 February 2024 CC	Points Race	(Japan) Naoki Kojima	(Kazakhstan) Alisher Zhumakan	(Hong Kong) Mow Ching Yin	
2024 Asian Track Cycling Championships; India 21–26 February 2024 CC	Points Race	(Japan) Tsuyaka Uchino	(Uzbekistan) Margarita Misyurina	(Hong Kong) Leung Bo Yee	
2024 Asian Track Cycling Championships; India 21–26 February 2024 CC	Scratch	(Indonesia) Terry Yudha Kusuma	(Japan) Shunsuke Imamura	(South Korea) Kim Hyeon-seok	
2024 Asian Track Cycling Championships; India 21–26 February 2024 CC	Scratch	(China) Liu Jiali	(Hong Kong) Lee Sze Wing	(Japan) Mizuki Ikeda	
2024 Asian Track Cycling Championships; India 21–26 February 2024 CC	Sprint	(Japan) Yuta Obara	(China) Zhiwei Li	(Malaysia) Muhammad Shah Firdaus Sahrom	
2024 Asian Track Cycling Championships; India 21–26 February 2024 CC	Sprint	(China) Lijuan Wang	(China) Mengqi Tong	(Malaysia) Nurul Izzah	
2024 Asian Track Cycling Championships; India 21–26 February 2024 CC	Time Trial	(China) Zhiwei Li	(Japan) Minato Nakaishi	(Kazakhstan) Kirill Kurdidi	
2024 Asian Track Cycling Championships; India 21–26 February 2024 CC	Time Trial	(Malaysia) Nurul Izzah	(South Korea) Hwang Hyeon-seo	(China) Shuyan Luo	
2024 Asian Track Cycling Championships; India 21–26 February 2024 CC	Madison	(Japan) Shunsuke Imamura (Japan) Kazushige Kuboki	(Indonesia) Bernard Van Aert (Indonesia) Terry Yudha Kusuma	(Kazakhstan) Alisher Zhumakan (Kazakhstan) Ramis Dinmukhametov	
2024 Asian Track Cycling Championships; India 21–26 February 2024 CC	Madison	(Japan) Tsuyaka Uchino (Japan) Maho Kakita	(Uzbekistan) Olga Zabelinskaya (Uzbekistan) Nafosat Kozieva	(Hong Kong) Leung Wing Yee (Hong Kong) Lee Sze Wing	
2024 Asian Track Cycling Championships; India 21–26 February 2024 CC	Team Pursuit	(Japan) Kazushige Kuboki (Japan) Naoki Kojima (Japan) Shoi Matsuda (Japan) Eiya Hashimoto	(China) Yang Yang (China) Zhengyu Pei (China) Haiao Zhang (China) Jinyan Zhang	(Kazakhstan) Alisher Zhumakan (Kazakhstan) Ramis Dinmukhametov (Kazakhstan) Ilya Karabutov (Kazakhstan) Dmitriy Noskov	
2024 Asian Track Cycling Championships; India 21–26 February 2024 CC	Team Pursuit	(Japan) Tsuyaka Uchino (Japan) Maho Kakita (Japan) Mizuki Ikeda (Japan) Yumi Kajihara	(China) Hongjie Zhang (China) Susu Wang (China) Xiaoyue Wang (China) Suwan Wei	(South Korea) Song Min-ji (South Korea) Kim Min-jeong (South Korea) Kang Hyun-kyung (South Korea) Lee Eun-hee	
2024 Asian Track Cycling Championships; India 21–26 February 2024 CC	Team Sprint	(Japan) Yuta Obara (Japan) Kento Yamasaki (Japan) Minato Nakaishi	(Malaysia) Ridwan Sahrom (Malaysia) Fadhil Zonis (Malaysia) Umar Hasbullah	(China) Zhiheng Jin (China) Zhiwei Li (China) Liu Kuan	
2024 Asian Track Cycling Championships; India 21–26 February 2024 CC	Team Sprint	(China) Fei Zhou (China) Mengqi Tong (China) Lijuan Wang	(Malaysia) Nurul Izzah (Malaysia) Anis Amira Rosidi (Malaysia) Aliana Azizan	(South Korea) Hwang Hyeon-seo (South Korea) Kim Hae-un (South Korea) Cho Sun-young	
Life's an Omnium Reversed; Switzerland 29 February 2024 CL2
Life's an Omnium Reversed; Switzerland 29 February 2024 CL2	Women's Elimination Race	(Switzerland) Michelle Andres	(Ukraine) Anna Kolyzhuk	(Germany) Fabienne Jährig	
Life's an Omnium Reversed; Switzerland 29 February 2024 CL2	Women's Madison	(Switzerland) Aline Seitz (Switzerland) Michelle Andres	(Switzerland) Janice Stettler (Switzerland) Cybèle Schneider	(Germany) Fabienne Jährig (Germany) Hanna Dopjans	
Life's an Omnium Reversed; Switzerland 29 February 2024 CL2	Men's Omnium	(Switzerland) Simon Vitzthum	(Switzerland) Alex Vogel	(Switzerland) Valère Thiébaud	
Life's an Omnium Reversed; Switzerland 29 February 2024 CL2	Women's Scratch	(Ukraine) Arina Korotieieva	(Ukraine) Anna Kolyzhuk	(Ukraine) Yelyzaveta Holod	
Troféu Internacional de Pista Artur Lopes; Portugal 2–3 March 2024 CL2
Troféu Internacional de Pista Artur Lopes; Portugal 2–3 March 2024 CL2	Points Race	(Portugal) Iúri Leitão	(Portugal) Ivo Oliveira	(Mexico) Fernando Nava	
Troféu Internacional de Pista Artur Lopes; Portugal 2–3 March 2024 CL2	Points Race	(Portugal) Daniela Campos	(Canada) Lily Plante	(Mexico) María Gaxiola	
Troféu Internacional de Pista Artur Lopes; Portugal 2–3 March 2024 CL2	Men's Keirin	(Poland) Mateusz Rudyk	(Italy) Stefano Moro	(Italy) Stefano Minuta	
Troféu Internacional de Pista Artur Lopes; Portugal 2–3 March 2024 CL2	Men's Madison	(Portugal) João Matias (Portugal) Iúri Leitão	(Denmark) Robin Juel Skivild (Denmark) Conrad Haugsted	(Mexico) Ricardo Peña Salas (Mexico) Fernando Nava	
Troféu Internacional de Pista Artur Lopes; Portugal 2–3 March 2024 CL2	Omnium	(Portugal) Ivo Oliveira	(Portugal) Iúri Leitão	(Spain) Erik Martorell	
Troféu Internacional de Pista Artur Lopes; Portugal 2–3 March 2024 CL2	Omnium	(Portugal) Maria Martins	(Spain) Eukene Larrarte	(Spain) Eva Anguela Yágüez	
Troféu Internacional de Pista Artur Lopes; Portugal 2–3 March 2024 CL2	Women's Scratch	(Portugal) Maria Martins	(Spain) Eukene Larrarte	(Spain) Laura Rodríguez Cordero	
Troféu Internacional de Pista Artur Lopes; Portugal 2–3 March 2024 CL2	Men's Sprint	(Poland) Mateusz Rudyk	(Italy) Stefano Moro	(Spain) José Moreno Sánchez	
2024 UCI Track Cycling Nations Cup II; Hong Kong 15–17 March 2024 CDN
2024 UCI Track Cycling Nations Cup II; Hong Kong 15–17 March 2024 CDN	Elimination Race	(United Kingdom) William Perrett	(Belgium) Jules Hesters	(Australia) Graeme Frislie	
2024 UCI Track Cycling Nations Cup II; Hong Kong 15–17 March 2024 CDN	Elimination Race	(Japan) Yumi Kajihara	(Norway) Anita Stenberg	(Mexico) Yareli Acevedo	
2024 UCI Track Cycling Nations Cup II; Hong Kong 15–17 March 2024 CDN	Keirin	(Israel) Mikhail Iakovlev	(Suriname) Jair Tjon En Fa	(Japan) Kento Yamasaki	
2024 UCI Track Cycling Nations Cup II; Hong Kong 15–17 March 2024 CDN	Keirin	(China) Lijuan Wang	(Germany) Lea Friedrich	(Japan) Riyu Ohta	
2024 UCI Track Cycling Nations Cup II; Hong Kong 15–17 March 2024 CDN	Omnium	(New Zealand) Aaron Gate	(France) Oscar Nilsson-Julien	(Japan) Naoki Kojima	
2024 UCI Track Cycling Nations Cup II; Hong Kong 15–17 March 2024 CDN	Omnium	(Japan) Yumi Kajihara	(Japan) Tsuyaka Uchino	(Republic of Ireland) Lara Gillespie	
2024 UCI Track Cycling Nations Cup II; Hong Kong 15–17 March 2024 CDN	Sprint	(Japan) Kaiya Ota	(Australia) Matthew Richardson	(Trinidad and Tobago) Nicholas Paul	
2024 UCI Track Cycling Nations Cup II; Hong Kong 15–17 March 2024 CDN	Sprint	(United Kingdom) Emma Finucane	(France) Mathilde Gros	(Germany) Lea Friedrich	
2024 UCI Track Cycling Nations Cup II; Hong Kong 15–17 March 2024 CDN	Madison	(New Zealand) Aaron Gate (New Zealand) Campbell Stewart	(Spain) Sebastián Mora (Spain) Albert Torres	(Japan) Eiya Hashimoto (Japan) Kazushige Kuboki	
2024 UCI Track Cycling Nations Cup II; Hong Kong 15–17 March 2024 CDN	Madison	(Japan) Maho Kakita (Japan) Tsuyaka Uchino	(New Zealand) Bryony Botha (New Zealand) Emily Shearman	(Netherlands) Marit Raaijmakers (Netherlands) Lisa van Belle	
2024 UCI Track Cycling Nations Cup II; Hong Kong 15–17 March 2024 CDN	Team Pursuit	(Denmark) Tobias Hansen (Denmark) Robin Juel Skivild (Denmark) Lasse Norman Leth (Denmark) Frederik Rodenberg	(Japan) Naoki Kojima (Japan) Eiya Hashimoto (Japan) Kazushige Kuboki (Japan) Shoi Matsuda	(New Zealand) Campbell Stewart (New Zealand) Tom Sexton (New Zealand) Keegan Hornblow (New Zealand) George Jackson	
2024 UCI Track Cycling Nations Cup II; Hong Kong 15–17 March 2024 CDN	Team Pursuit	(New Zealand) Bryony Botha (New Zealand) Emily Shearman (New Zealand) Samantha Donnelly (New Zealand) Nicole Shields	(Republic of Ireland) Lara Gillespie (Republic of Ireland) Mia Griffin (Republic of Ireland) Kelly Murphy (Republic of Ireland) Alice Sharpe	(Japan) Mizuki Ikeda (Japan) Yumi Kajihara (Japan) Maho Kakita (Japan) Tsuyaka Uchino	
2024 UCI Track Cycling Nations Cup II; Hong Kong 15–17 March 2024 CDN	Team Sprint	(Australia) Thomas Cornish (Australia) Leigh Hoffman (Australia) Matthew Richardson	(Japan) Yoshitaku Nagasako (Japan) Yuta Obara (Japan) Kaiya Ota	(China) Guo Shuai (China) Qi Liu (China) Yu Zhou	
2024 UCI Track Cycling Nations Cup II; Hong Kong 15–17 March 2024 CDN	Team Sprint	(United Kingdom) Sophie Capewell (United Kingdom) Emma Finucane (United Kingdom) Katy Marchant	(Germany) Lea Friedrich (Germany) Pauline Grabosch (Germany) Emma Hinze	(China) Bao Shanju (China) Guo Yufang (China) Yuan Liying	
African Shield; South Africa 28 March 2024 CL2
African Shield; South Africa 28 March 2024 CL2	Men's Keirin	(South Africa) Douglas Abbot	(South Africa) James Swart	(South Africa) Mitchell Sparrow	
African Shield; South Africa 28 March 2024 CL2	Men's Time Trial	(South Africa) Michael Jervis	(South Africa) James Swart	(South Africa) Douglas Abbot	
African Shield; South Africa 28 March 2024 CL2	Omnium	(South Africa) Joshua Dike	(South Africa) Dániyal Matthews	(South Africa) Ethan Kulsen	
African Shield; South Africa 28 March 2024 CL2	Omnium	(South Africa) Ainslii de Beer			
Good Friday racing United Kingdom 29 March 2024 CL2
Good Friday racing United Kingdom 29 March 2024 CL2	Elimination Race	(United Kingdom) Frank Longstaff	(United Kingdom) William Roberts	(United Kingdom) David Brearley	
Good Friday racing United Kingdom 29 March 2024 CL2	Elimination Race	(United Kingdom) Lucy Nelson	(Slovakia) Alžbeta Bačíková	(United Kingdom) Miriam Jessett	
Good Friday racing United Kingdom 29 March 2024 CL2	Points Race	(United Kingdom) William Roberts	(United Kingdom) Jack Hartley	(United Kingdom) Andrew Brinkley	
Good Friday racing United Kingdom 29 March 2024 CL2	Points Race	(United Kingdom) Miriam Jessett	(Republic of Ireland) Lucy Bénézet Minns	(United Kingdom) Dannielle Watkinson	
Good Friday racing United Kingdom 29 March 2024 CL2	Scratch	(United Kingdom) William Roberts	(United Kingdom) Frank Longstaff	(United Kingdom) Andrew Brinkley	
Good Friday racing United Kingdom 29 March 2024 CL2	Scratch	(United Kingdom) Jenny Holl	(Slovakia) Alžbeta Bačíková	(Italy) Francesca Selva	
Good Friday racing United Kingdom 29 March 2024 CL2	Men's Sprint	(United Kingdom) Peter Mitchell	(United Kingdom) Matthew Meanwell	(United Kingdom) William Munday	
Easter International Grand Prix; Trinidad and Tobago 29–31 March 2024 CL2
Easter International Grand Prix; Trinidad and Tobago 29–31 March 2024 CL2	Men's Elimination Race	(Trinidad and Tobago) Tariq Woods	(Barbados) Edwin Sutherland	(Trinidad and Tobago) Liam Trepte	
Easter International Grand Prix; Trinidad and Tobago 29–31 March 2024 CL2	Keirin	(Trinidad and Tobago) Ryan D'Abreau	(Trinidad and Tobago) Samuel Maloney	(Trinidad and Tobago) Zion Pulido	
Easter International Grand Prix; Trinidad and Tobago 29–31 March 2024 CL2	Keirin	(Jamaica) Dahlia Palmer	(Trinidad and Tobago) Phoebe Sandy	(Trinidad and Tobago) Adrianna Seyjagat	
Easter International Grand Prix; Trinidad and Tobago 29–31 March 2024 CL2	Sprint	(Trinidad and Tobago) Zion Pulido	(Trinidad and Tobago) Ryan D'Abreau	(Trinidad and Tobago) Kyle Caraby	
Easter International Grand Prix; Trinidad and Tobago 29–31 March 2024 CL2	Sprint	(Trinidad and Tobago) Makaira Wallace	(Jamaica) Dahlia Palmer	(Trinidad and Tobago) Phoebe Sandy	
Easter International Grand Prix; Trinidad and Tobago 29–31 March 2024 CL2	Men's Points Race	(United Kingdom) Fred Meredith	(United States) Patton Sims	(Barbados) Edwin Sutherland	
Easter International Grand Prix; Trinidad and Tobago 29–31 March 2024 CL2	Men's Scratch	(United Kingdom) Fred Meredith	(United States) Bradley Green	(United States) Patton Sims	
Easter International Grand Prix; Trinidad and Tobago 29–31 March 2024 CL2	Men's Omnium	(United States) Patton Sims	(Trinidad and Tobago) Liam Trepte	(Trinidad and Tobago) Tariq Woods	
Life's an Omnium Madison; Switzerland 5–6 April 2024 CL2
Life's an Omnium Madison; Switzerland 5–6 April 2024 CL2	Madison	(Italy) Michele Scartezzini (Italy) Elia Viviani	(Netherlands) Roy Eefting (Switzerland) Claudio Imhof	(Switzerland) Lukas Rüegg (Switzerland) Valère Thiébaud	
Life's an Omnium Madison; Switzerland 5–6 April 2024 CL2	Madison	(Switzerland) Michelle Andres (Switzerland) Aline Seitz	(Germany) Messane Bräutigam (Germany) Judith Friederike Rottmann	(Switzerland) Cybèle Schneider (Switzerland) Jasmin Liechti	
Life's an Omnium Madison; Switzerland 5–6 April 2024 CL2	Points Race	(Italy) Michele Scartezzini	(Italy) Elia Viviani	(Switzerland) Luca Bühlmann	
Life's an Omnium Madison; Switzerland 5–6 April 2024 CL2	Points Race	(Uzbekistan) Nafosat Kozieva	(Italy) Martina Alzini	(Italy) Valentina Zanzi	
Life's an Omnium Madison; Switzerland 5–6 April 2024 CL2	Scratch	(Netherlands) Roy Eefting	(Switzerland) Nicolò De Lisi	(Italy) Mattia Pinazzi	
Life's an Omnium Madison; Switzerland 5–6 April 2024 CL2	Scratch	(Uzbekistan) Margarita Misyurina	(Switzerland) Aline Seitz	(Israel) Ori Bash Dubinski	
2024 Pan American Track Championships; United States 3–7 April 2024 CC
2024 Pan American Track Championships; United States 3–7 April 2024 CC	Elimination Race	(United States) Grant Koontz	(Colombia) Jordan Parra	(Chile) Jacob Decar	
2024 Pan American Track Championships; United States 3–7 April 2024 CC	Elimination Race	(United States) Jennifer Valente	(Colombia) Juliana Londoño	(Mexico) Yareli Acevedo	
2024 Pan American Track Championships; United States 3–7 April 2024 CC	Individual Pursuit	(United States) Anders Johnson	(Canada) Chris Ernst	(Canada) Daniel Fraser-Maraun	
2024 Pan American Track Championships; United States 3–7 April 2024 CC	Individual Pursuit	(United States) Emily Ehrlich	(Chile) Aranza Villalón	(United States) Olivia Cummins	
2024 Pan American Track Championships; United States 3–7 April 2024 CC	Keirin	(Trinidad and Tobago) Nicholas Paul	(Colombia) Kevin Quintero	(Trinidad and Tobago) Kwesi Browne	
2024 Pan American Track Championships; United States 3–7 April 2024 CC	Keirin	(Colombia) Martha Bayona	(Mexico) Daniela Gaxiola	(Canada) Kelsey Mitchell	
2024 Pan American Track Championships; United States 3–7 April 2024 CC	Points Race	(United States) Peter Moore	(Colombia) Bryan Gómez	(Argentina) Franco Buchanan	
2024 Pan American Track Championships; United States 3–7 April 2024 CC	Points Race	(United States) Jennifer Valente	(Mexico) Victoria Velasco	(Canada) Lily Plante	
2024 Pan American Track Championships; United States 3–7 April 2024 CC	Scratch	(Mexico) Fernando Nava	(Chile) Cristian Arriagada Pizarro	(Trinidad and Tobago) Akil Campbell	
2024 Pan American Track Championships; United States 3–7 April 2024 CC	Scratch	(United States) Jennifer Valente	(Canada) Lily Plante	(Barbados) Amber Joseph	
2024 Pan American Track Championships; United States 3–7 April 2024 CC	Sprint	(Trinidad and Tobago) Nicholas Paul	(Colombia) Cristian Ortega	(Colombia) Santiago Ramírez	
2024 Pan American Track Championships; United States 3–7 April 2024 CC	Sprint	(Mexico) Daniela Gaxiola	(Canada) Kelsey Mitchell	(Colombia) Martha Bayona	
2024 Pan American Track Championships; United States 3–7 April 2024 CC	Time Trial	(Colombia) Santiago Ramírez	(Colombia) Cristian Ortega	(United States) David Domonoske	
2024 Pan American Track Championships; United States 3–7 April 2024 CC	Time Trial	(Colombia) Martha Bayona	(Mexico) Jessica Salazar	(United States) Emily Hayes	
2024 Pan American Track Championships; United States 3–7 April 2024 CC	Omnium	(Canada) Chris Ernst	(Colombia) Juan Esteban Arango	(Mexico) Ricardo Peña Salas	
2024 Pan American Track Championships; United States 3–7 April 2024 CC	Omnium	(United States) Jennifer Valente	(Colombia) Lina Hernández	(Mexico) Yareli Acevedo	
2024 Pan American Track Championships; United States 3–7 April 2024 CC	Madison	(United States) Grant Koontz (United States) Peter Moore	(Mexico) Fernando Nava (Mexico) Edibaldo Maldonado	(Colombia) Juan Esteban Arango (Colombia) Jordan Parra	
2024 Pan American Track Championships; United States 3–7 April 2024 CC	Madison	(United States) Megan Jastrab (United States) Jennifer Valente	(Colombia) Juliana Londoño (Colombia) Lina Hernández	(Canada) Lily Plante (Canada) Ngaire Barraclough	
2024 Pan American Track Championships; United States 3–7 April 2024 CC	Team Pursuit	(United States) David Domonoske (United States) Anders Johnson (United States) Grant Koontz (United States) Brendan Rhim	(Colombia) Juan Esteban Arango (Colombia) Bryan Gómez (Colombia) Jordan Parra (Colombia) Brayan Sánchez	(Canada) Chris Ernst (Canada) Cameron Fitzmaurice (Canada) Daniel Fraser-Maraun (Canada) Ethan Powell	
2024 Pan American Track Championships; United States 3–7 April 2024 CC	Team Pursuit	(United States) Olivia Cummins (United States) Emily Ehrlich (United States) Colleen Gulick (United States) Bethany Ingram	(Canada) Ngaire Barraclough (Canada) Kiara Lylyk (Canada) Lily Plante (Canada) Anika Brants	(Mexico) Yareli Acevedo (Mexico) Antonieta Gaxiola (Mexico) Lizbeth Salazar (Mexico) Victoria Velasco	
2024 Pan American Track Championships; United States 3–7 April 2024 CC	Team Sprint	(Colombia) Rubén Murillo (Colombia) Kevin Quintero (Colombia) Santiago Ramírez	(Canada) Tyler Rorke (Canada) Nick Wammes (Canada) James Hedgcock	(United States) Joshua Hartman (United States) Dalton Walters (United States) Evan Boone	
2024 Pan American Track Championships; United States 3–7 April 2024 CC	Team Sprint	(Mexico) Jessica Salazar (Mexico) Yuli Verdugo (Mexico) Daniela Gaxiola	(Canada) Sarah Orban (Canada) Kelsey Mitchell (Canada) Lauriane Genest	(United States) Keely Ainslie (United States) Kayla Hankins (United States) Mandy Marquardt	
2024 UCI Track Cycling Nations Cup III; Canada 12–14 April 2024 CDN
2024 UCI Track Cycling Nations Cup III; Canada 12–14 April 2024 CDN	Elimination Race	(Canada) Dylan Bibic	(Japan) Shunsuke Imamura	(United Kingdom) Mark Stewart	
2024 UCI Track Cycling Nations Cup III; Canada 12–14 April 2024 CDN	Elimination Race	(United States) Jennifer Valente	(Italy) Letizia Paternoster	(Norway) Anita Stenberg	
2024 UCI Track Cycling Nations Cup III; Canada 12–14 April 2024 CDN	Keirin	(Netherlands) Harrie Lavreysen	(Netherlands) Jeffrey Hoogland	(United Kingdom) Jack Carlin	
2024 UCI Track Cycling Nations Cup III; Canada 12–14 April 2024 CDN	Keirin	(New Zealand) Ellesse Andrews	(Netherlands) Steffie van der Peet	(Canada) Lauriane Genest	
2024 UCI Track Cycling Nations Cup III; Canada 12–14 April 2024 CDN	Omnium	(United Kingdom) Ethan Hayter	(Japan) Kazushige Kuboki	(France) Benjamin Thomas	
2024 UCI Track Cycling Nations Cup III; Canada 12–14 April 2024 CDN	Omnium	(United Kingdom) Katie Archibald	(Italy) Letizia Paternoster	(United States) Jennifer Valente	
2024 UCI Track Cycling Nations Cup III; Canada 12–14 April 2024 CDN	Sprint	(Netherlands) Harrie Lavreysen	(Suriname) Jair Tjon En Fa	(Trinidad and Tobago) Nicholas Paul	
2024 UCI Track Cycling Nations Cup III; Canada 12–14 April 2024 CDN	Sprint	(France) Mathilde Gros	(New Zealand) Ellesse Andrews	(Mexico) Daniela Gaxiola	
2024 UCI Track Cycling Nations Cup III; Canada 12–14 April 2024 CDN	Madison	(Belgium) Lindsay De Vylder (Belgium) Robbe Ghys	(Netherlands) Yanne Dorenbos (Netherlands) Jan-Willem van Schip	(Portugal) Ivo Oliveira (Portugal) Iúri Leitão	
2024 UCI Track Cycling Nations Cup III; Canada 12–14 April 2024 CDN	Madison	(United Kingdom) Katie Archibald (United Kingdom) Neah Evans	(France) Valentine Fortin (France) Marion Borras	(United States) Jennifer Valente (United States) Lily Williams	
2024 UCI Track Cycling Nations Cup III; Canada 12–14 April 2024 CDN	Team Pursuit	(United Kingdom) Ethan Hayter (United Kingdom) Daniel Bigham (United Kingdom) Ethan Vernon (United Kingdom) Oliver Wood	(Belgium) Tuur Dens (Belgium) Thibaut Bernard (Belgium) Yoran Van Gucht (Belgium) Noah Vandenbranden	(France) Thomas Boudat (France) Thomas Denis (France) Corentin Ermenault (France) Valentin Tabellion	
2024 UCI Track Cycling Nations Cup III; Canada 12–14 April 2024 CDN	Team Pursuit	(United Kingdom) Katie Archibald (United Kingdom) Jessica Roberts (United Kingdom) Josie Knight (United Kingdom) Anna Morris	(Italy) Elisa Balsamo (Italy) Chiara Consonni (Italy) Martina Alzini (Italy) Vittoria Guazzini	(France) Clara Copponi (France) Valentine Fortin (France) Marion Borras (France) Marie Le Net	
2024 UCI Track Cycling Nations Cup III; Canada 12–14 April 2024 CDN	Team Sprint	(Netherlands) Roy van den Berg (Netherlands) Harrie Lavreysen (Netherlands) Jeffrey Hoogland	(United Kingdom) Ed Lowe (United Kingdom) Hamish Turnbull (United Kingdom) Jack Carlin	(Canada) Tyler Rorke (Canada) Ryan Dodyk (Canada) James Hedgcock	
2024 UCI Track Cycling Nations Cup III; Canada 12–14 April 2024 CDN	Team Sprint	(Netherlands) Kyra Lamberink (Netherlands) Hetty van de Wouw (Netherlands) Steffie van der Peet	(Mexico) Jessica Salazar (Mexico) Yuli Verdugo (Mexico) Daniela Gaxiola	(Poland) Marlena Karwacka (Poland) Urszula Łoś (Poland) Nikola Sibiak	
GP Junek Velodromes; Czech Republic 4–5 May 2024 CL2
GP Junek Velodromes; Czech Republic 4–5 May 2024 CL2	Keirin	(Czech Republic) Dominik Topinka	(Poland) Eliasz Bednarek	(Poland) Maciej Bielecki	
GP Junek Velodromes; Czech Republic 4–5 May 2024 CL2	Keirin	(Poland) Nikola Sibiak	(Poland) Marlena Karwacka	(Poland) Paulina Petri	
GP Junek Velodromes; Czech Republic 4–5 May 2024 CL2	Omnium	(Poland) Filip Prokopyszyn	(Ukraine) Vitaliy Hryniv	(Czech Republic) Daniel Babor	
GP Junek Velodromes; Czech Republic 4–5 May 2024 CL2	Omnium	(Lithuania) Olivija Baleišytė	(Czech Republic) Barbora Němcová	(Slovakia) Alžbeta Bačíková	
GP Junek Velodromes; Czech Republic 4–5 May 2024 CL2	Points Race	(Poland) Filip Prokopyszyn	(Poland) Kacper Majewski	(United States) Daniel Breuer	
GP Junek Velodromes; Czech Republic 4–5 May 2024 CL2	Points Race	(Ukraine) Tetyana Klimchenko	(Czech Republic) Barbora Němcová	(Lithuania) Olivija Baleišytė	
GP Junek Velodromes; Czech Republic 4–5 May 2024 CL2	Scratch	(Poland) Filip Prokopyszyn	(Georgia (country)) Avtandil Piranishvili	(Sweden) Gustav Johansson	
GP Junek Velodromes; Czech Republic 4–5 May 2024 CL2	Scratch	(Lithuania) Olivija Baleišytė	(Czech Republic) Hana Heřmanovská	(Slovakia) Alžbeta Bačíková	
GP Junek Velodromes; Czech Republic 4–5 May 2024 CL2	Sprint	(Poland) Eliasz Bednarek	(Greece) Ioannis Kalogeropoulos	(Czech Republic) Dominik Topinka	
GP Junek Velodromes; Czech Republic 4–5 May 2024 CL2	Sprint	(Poland) Paulina Petri	(Poland) Marlena Karwacka	(Poland) Nikola Sibiak	
ASEAN Track Series (President Cup) 1 Malaysia 3 May 2024 CL2
ASEAN Track Series (President Cup) 1 Malaysia 3 May 2024 CL2	Elimination Race	(South Korea) Park Sang-hoon	(South Korea) Somang Joo	(Malaysia) Harrif Saleh	
ASEAN Track Series (President Cup) 1 Malaysia 3 May 2024 CL2	Elimination Race	(Malaysia) Zhen Yi Yeong	(New Zealand) Sophie Maxwell	(Malaysia) Ci Hui Nyo	
ASEAN Track Series (President Cup) 1 Malaysia 3 May 2024 CL2	Keirin	(Malaysia) Azizulhasni Awang	(Malaysia) Ahmad Safwan Ahmad Nazeri	(Indonesia) Dhentaka Dika Alif	
ASEAN Track Series (President Cup) 1 Malaysia 3 May 2024 CL2	Keirin	(Malaysia) Nurul Izzah Izzati Mohd Asri	(Malaysia) Ratu Afifah Nur Indah	(Malaysia) Ann Yii Yong	
ASEAN Track Series (President Cup) 1 Malaysia 3 May 2024 CL2	Sprint	(Malaysia) Azizulhasni Awang	(Malaysia) Muhammad Ridwan Sahrom	(Australia) Sam Gallagher	
ASEAN Track Series (President Cup) 1 Malaysia 3 May 2024 CL2	Sprint	(Malaysia) Nurul Izzah Izzati Mohd Asri	(Malaysia) Nurul Aliana Syafika Azizan	(New Zealand) Jodie Blackwood	
ASEAN Track Series (President Cup) 1 Malaysia 3 May 2024 CL2	Scratch	(Malaysia) Abdul Azim Aliyas	(South Korea) Park Sang-hoon	(South Korea) Bae Hyoung-jun	
ASEAN Track Series (President Cup) 1 Malaysia 3 May 2024 CL2	Scratch	(Malaysia) Ci Hui Nyo	(Malaysia) Zhen Yi Yeong	(New Zealand) Meghan Baker	
ASEAN Track Series (President Cup) 2 Malaysia 4 May 2024 CL2
ASEAN Track Series (President Cup) 2 Malaysia 4 May 2024 CL2	Elimination Race	(South Korea) Park Sang-hoon	(Malaysia) Harrif Saleh	(Malaysia) New Joe Lau	
ASEAN Track Series (President Cup) 2 Malaysia 4 May 2024 CL2	Elimination Race	(Malaysia) Ci Hui Nyo	(Malaysia) Zhen Yi Yeong	(Singapore) Valencia Tan	
ASEAN Track Series (President Cup) 2 Malaysia 4 May 2024 CL2	Keirin	(Malaysia) Ridwan Sahrom	(Malaysia) Muhammad Shah Firdaus Sahrom	(Malaysia) Ahmad Safwan Nazeri	
ASEAN Track Series (President Cup) 2 Malaysia 4 May 2024 CL2	Keirin	(Malaysia) Nurul Izzah Izzati Mohd Asri	(Malaysia) Yong Ann Tung	(Malaysia) Nurul Aliana Syafika Azizan	
ASEAN Track Series (President Cup) 2 Malaysia 4 May 2024 CL2	Points Race	(New Zealand) Daniel Morton	(Malaysia) New Joe Lau	(Malaysia) Muhammad Afiq Iskandar Hasyim	
ASEAN Track Series (President Cup) 2 Malaysia 4 May 2024 CL2	Points Race	(New Zealand) Sophie Maxwell	(Malaysia) Zhen Yi Yeong	(Malaysia) Mya Wolfenden	
Tel Aviv Open Championships; Israel 3–4 May 2024 CL2; Cancelled
Silk Way Series Astana I Kazakhstan 17 May 2024 CL2
Silk Way Series Astana I Kazakhstan 17 May 2024 CL2	Elimination Race	(Kazakhstan) Ramis Dinmukhametov	(Kazakhstan) Ilya Karabutov	(Kazakhstan) Alisher Zhumakan	
Silk Way Series Astana I Kazakhstan 17 May 2024 CL2	Elimination Race	(Lithuania) Lauryna Valiukevičiūtė	(Kazakhstan) Gulnaz Kumetbekyzy	(Kazakhstan) Dinara Kopzhasarova	
Silk Way Series Astana I Kazakhstan 17 May 2024 CL2	Keirin	(Kazakhstan) Andrey Chugay	(Kazakhstan) Sergey Ponomarev	(Lithuania) Laurynas Vinskas	
Silk Way Series Astana I Kazakhstan 17 May 2024 CL2	Keirin	(Lithuania) Lauryna Valiukevičiūtė	(Kazakhstan) Yuliya Golubkova	(Kazakhstan) Diana Kosolapova	
Silk Way Series Astana I Kazakhstan 17 May 2024 CL2	Scratch	(Kazakhstan) Ilya Karabutov	(Kazakhstan) Maxim Khoroshavin	(Kazakhstan) Alisher Zhumakan	
Silk Way Series Astana I Kazakhstan 17 May 2024 CL2	Scratch	(Kazakhstan) Aruzhan Rakhmzhan	(Kazakhstan) Karina Abdrakhmanova	(Kazakhstan) Dinara Kopzhasarova	
Silk Way Series Astana II; Kazakhstan 18 May 2024 CL2
Silk Way Series Astana II; Kazakhstan 18 May 2024 CL2	Men's Madison	(Kazakhstan) Ilya Karabutov (Kazakhstan) Alisher Zhumakan	(Kazakhstan) Ramis Dinmukhametov (Kazakhstan) Sergey Karmazhakov	(Kazakhstan) Dmitriy Noskov (Kazakhstan) Maxim Khoroshavin	
Silk Way Series Astana II; Kazakhstan 18 May 2024 CL2	Omnium	(Kazakhstan) Alisher Zhumakan	(Kazakhstan) Ramis Dinmukhametov	(Kazakhstan) Ilya Karabutov	
Silk Way Series Astana II; Kazakhstan 18 May 2024 CL2	Omnium	(Kazakhstan) Olga Glushkova	(Kazakhstan) Aruzhan Rakhmzhan	(Kazakhstan) Karina Abdrakhmanova	
Silk Way Series Astana II; Kazakhstan 18 May 2024 CL2	Sprint	(Lithuania) Laurynas Vinskas	(Kazakhstan) Sergey Ponomarev	(Kazakhstan) Dmitriy Rezanov	
Silk Way Series Astana II; Kazakhstan 18 May 2024 CL2	Sprint	(Lithuania) Lauryna Valiukevičiūtė	(Kazakhstan) Diana Kosolapova	(Kazakhstan) Anna Petuhova	
Japan Track Cup I Japan 9–10 May 2024 CL1
Japan Track Cup I Japan 9–10 May 2024 CL1	Elimination Race	(Japan) Kazushige Kuboki	(Japan) Shunsuke Imamura	(Japan) Naoki Kojima	
Japan Track Cup I Japan 9–10 May 2024 CL1	Elimination Race	(Japan) Tsuyaka Uchino	(Japan) Maho Kakita	(Hong Kong) Lee Sze Wing	
Japan Track Cup I Japan 9–10 May 2024 CL1	Keirin	(Japan) Shinji Nakano	(Japan) Kaiya Ota	(Japan) Kento Yamasaki	
Japan Track Cup I Japan 9–10 May 2024 CL1	Keirin	(Japan) Mina Sato	(Hong Kong) Sze Wing Ng	(Japan) Fuko Umekawa	
Japan Track Cup I Japan 9–10 May 2024 CL1	Omnium	(Japan) Kazushige Kuboki	(Japan) Shunsuke Imamura	(Japan) Tetsuo Yamamoto	
Japan Track Cup I Japan 9–10 May 2024 CL1	Omnium	(Japan) Tsuyaka Uchino	(Japan) Maho Kakita	(Hong Kong) Lee Sze Wing	
Japan Track Cup I Japan 9–10 May 2024 CL1	Sprint	(Japan) Kaiya Ota	(Japan) Yuta Obara	(Japan) Kento Yamasaki	
Japan Track Cup I Japan 9–10 May 2024 CL1	Sprint	(Japan) Mina Sato	(Japan) Fuko Umekawa	(Japan) Noa Obara	
Japan Track Cup I Japan 9–10 May 2024 CL1	Madison	(Japan) Kazushige Kuboki (Japan) Shunsuke Imamura	(Japan) Eiya Hashimoto (Japan) Naoki Kojima	(Japan) Tetsuo Yamamoto (Japan) Shoki Kawano	
Japan Track Cup I Japan 9–10 May 2024 CL1	Madison	(Japan) Tsuyaka Uchino (Japan) Maho Kakita	(Hong Kong) Lee Sze Wing (Hong Kong) Wing Yee Leung	(Japan) Mizuki Ikeda (New Zealand) Prudence Fowler	
Japan Track Cup II; Japan 11–12 May 2024 CL1
Japan Track Cup II; Japan 11–12 May 2024 CL1	Elimination Race	(Japan) Kazushige Kuboki	(Japan) Shunsuke Imamura	(Australia) Kurt Eather	
Japan Track Cup II; Japan 11–12 May 2024 CL1	Elimination Race	(Japan) Tsuyaka Uchino	(Japan) Maho Kakita	(Japan) Mizuki Ikeda	
Japan Track Cup II; Japan 11–12 May 2024 CL1	Keirin	(Japan) Kaiya Ota	(Japan) Kento Yamasaki	(Malaysia) Azizulhasni Awang	
Japan Track Cup II; Japan 11–12 May 2024 CL1	Keirin	(Japan) Mina Sato	(Japan) Fuko Umekawa	(Japan) Riyu Ohta	
Japan Track Cup II; Japan 11–12 May 2024 CL1	Omnium	(Japan) Kazushige Kuboki	(Japan) Shunsuke Imamura	(Japan) Tetsuo Yamamoto	
Japan Track Cup II; Japan 11–12 May 2024 CL1	Omnium	(Japan) Tsuyaka Uchino	(Japan) Maho Kakita	(Hong Kong) Lee Sze Wing	
Japan Track Cup II; Japan 11–12 May 2024 CL1	Points Race	(Japan) Tetsuo Yamamoto	(Japan) Shunsuke Imamura	(Japan) Kazushige Kuboki	
Japan Track Cup II; Japan 11–12 May 2024 CL1	Points Race	(Japan) Tsuyaka Uchino	(Japan) Maho Kakita	(Hong Kong) Lee Sze Wing	
Japan Track Cup II; Japan 11–12 May 2024 CL1	Scratch	(Australia) Conor Leahy	(Japan) Shoi Matsuda	(China) Wang Mengjie	
Japan Track Cup II; Japan 11–12 May 2024 CL1	Scratch	(Japan) Maho Kakita	(Japan) Tsuyaka Uchino	(Hong Kong) Lee Sze Wing	
Japan Track Cup II; Japan 11–12 May 2024 CL1	Sprint	(Japan) Kaiya Ota	(Japan) Yuta Obara	(Malaysia) Azizulhasni Awang	
Japan Track Cup II; Japan 11–12 May 2024 CL1	Sprint	(Japan) Mina Sato	(Japan) Fuko Umekawa	(Japan) Riyu Ohta	
Japan Track Cup II; Japan 11–12 May 2024 CL1	Madison	(Japan) Shunsuke Imamura (Japan) Naoki Kojima	(Japan) Kazushige Kuboki (Japan) Eiya Hashimoto	(Japan) Tetsuo Yamamoto (Japan) Shoki Kawano	
Japan Track Cup II; Japan 11–12 May 2024 CL1	Madison	(Japan) Tsuyaka Uchino (Japan) Maho Kakita	(Japan) Mizuki Ikeda (China) Zhou Menghan	(Hong Kong) Lee Sze Wing (Hong Kong) Wing Yee Leung	
GP Framar; Czech Republic 10–11 May 2024 CL1
GP Framar; Czech Republic 10–11 May 2024 CL1	Keirin	(Colombia) Cristian Ortega	(Colombia) Kevin Quintero	(Czech Republic) Matěj Bohuslávek	
GP Framar; Czech Republic 10–11 May 2024 CL1	Keirin	(Colombia) Martha Bayona	(Poland) Nikola Sibiak	(Colombia) Stefany Cuadrado	
GP Framar; Czech Republic 10–11 May 2024 CL1	Omnium	(Denmark) Robin Juel Skivild	(Germany) Moritz Augenstein	(Austria) Tim Wafler	
GP Framar; Czech Republic 10–11 May 2024 CL1	Omnium	(Norway) Anita Stenberg	(Lithuania) Olivija Baleišytė	(Czech Republic) Petra Ševčíková	
GP Framar; Czech Republic 10–11 May 2024 CL1	Points Race	(Germany) Moritz Augenstein	(Poland) Filip Prokopyszyn	(Denmark) Robin Juel Skivild	
GP Framar; Czech Republic 10–11 May 2024 CL1	Points Race	(Lithuania) Olivija Baleišytė	(Norway) Anita Stenberg	(Denmark) Julie Norman Leth	
GP Framar; Czech Republic 10–11 May 2024 CL1	Sprint	(Colombia) Kevin Quintero	(Colombia) Cristian Ortega	(Poland) Eliasz Bednarek	
GP Framar; Czech Republic 10–11 May 2024 CL1	Sprint	(Colombia) Martha Bayona	(Poland) Paulina Petri	(Germany) Clara Schneider	
GP Framar; Czech Republic 10–11 May 2024 CL1	Scratch	(Germany) Moritz Augenstein	(Germany) Bruno Kessler	(Poland) Filip Prokopyszyn	
GP Framar; Czech Republic 10–11 May 2024 CL1	Scratch	(Lithuania) Olivija Baleišytė	(Ukraine) Tetyana Klimchenko	(Denmark) Ellen Hjøllund Klinge	
GP Praha 10; Czech Republic 12 May 2024 CL2
GP Praha 10; Czech Republic 12 May 2024 CL2	Omnium	(Germany) Moritz Augenstein	(Switzerland) Simon Vitzthum	(Denmark) Robin Juel Skivild	
GP Praha 10; Czech Republic 12 May 2024 CL2	Omnium	(Norway) Anita Stenberg	(Denmark) Ellen Hjøllund Klinge	(Germany) Lana Eberle	
GP Praha 10; Czech Republic 12 May 2024 CL2	Sprint	(Colombia) Santiago Ramírez	(Colombia) Kevin Quintero	(Germany) Danny-Luca Werner	
GP Praha 10; Czech Republic 12 May 2024 CL2	Sprint	(Colombia) Martha Bayona	(Poland) Nikola Sibiak	(Germany) Clara Schneider	
500+1 kolo: Embedded UCI races Czech Republic 14–16 May 2024 CL2
500+1 kolo: Embedded UCI races Czech Republic 14–16 May 2024 CL2	Elimination Race	(Italy) Matteo Donegà	(Turkey) Ramazan Yılmaz	(Slovenia) Žak Eržen	
500+1 kolo: Embedded UCI races Czech Republic 14–16 May 2024 CL2	Elimination Race	(Lithuania) Olivija Baleišytė	(Poland) Eliza Rabażyńska	(Poland) Zuzanna Chylińska	
500+1 kolo: Embedded UCI races Czech Republic 14–16 May 2024 CL2	Points Race	(Ukraine) Vitaliy Hryniv	(Czech Republic) Michal Rotter	(Italy) Matteo Donegà	
500+1 kolo: Embedded UCI races Czech Republic 14–16 May 2024 CL2	Points Race	(Egypt) Ebtissam Mohamed	(Poland) Zuzanna Chylińska	(Lithuania) Olivija Baleišytė	
500+1 kolo: Embedded UCI races Czech Republic 14–16 May 2024 CL2	Scratch	(Denmark) Oskar Winkler	(Turkey) Ramazan Yılmaz	(Czech Republic) Radovan Štec	
500+1 kolo: Embedded UCI races Czech Republic 14–16 May 2024 CL2	Scratch	(Poland) Eliza Rabażyńska	(Lithuania) Olivija Baleišytė	(Ukraine) Tetyana Klimchenko	
Bahnen-Tournee - Silbernen Eulen von Ludwigshafen; Germany 15 May 2024 CL2
Bahnen-Tournee - Silbernen Eulen von Ludwigshafen; Germany 15 May 2024 CL2	Elimination Race	(Germany) Moritz Augenstein	(Venezuela) Clever Martínez	(Italy) Nicolò De Lisi	
Bahnen-Tournee - Silbernen Eulen von Ludwigshafen; Germany 15 May 2024 CL2	Elimination Race	(Switzerland) Jasmin Liechti	(Czech Republic) Petra Ševčíková	(Slovakia) Alžbeta Bačíková	
Bahnen-Tournee - Silbernen Eulen von Ludwigshafen; Germany 15 May 2024 CL2	Women's Keirin				
Bahnen-Tournee - Silbernen Eulen von Ludwigshafen; Germany 15 May 2024 CL2	Men's Madison				
Bahnen-Tournee - Silbernen Eulen von Ludwigshafen; Germany 15 May 2024 CL2	Women's Points Race	(Czech Republic) Petra Ševčíková	(Norway) Nora Tveit	(Germany) Fabienne Jährig	
Bahnen-Tournee - Silbernen Eulen von Ludwigshafen; Germany 15 May 2024 CL2	Men's Scratch				
Bahnen-Tournee - Silbernen Eulen von Ludwigshafen; Germany 15 May 2024 CL2	Men's Sprint	(Germany) Henric Hackmann	(India) Esow Alben	(Hungary) Sándor Szalontay	
Bahnen-Tournee Darmstadt; Germany 16 May 2024 CL2
Bahnen-Tournee Darmstadt; Germany 16 May 2024 CL2	Elimination Race	(Germany) Benjamin Boos	(Germany) Moritz Malcharek	(Germany) Moritz Augenstein	
Bahnen-Tournee Darmstadt; Germany 16 May 2024 CL2	Elimination Race	(Norway) Nora Tveit	(Spain) Laura Rodríguez Cordero	(Czech Republic) Gabriela Bártová	
Bahnen-Tournee Darmstadt; Germany 16 May 2024 CL2	Keirin	(India) Esow Alben	(India) Ronaldo Laitonjam	(Australia) Maxwell Liebeknecht	
Bahnen-Tournee Darmstadt; Germany 16 May 2024 CL2	Keirin	(Canada) Emy Savard	(Czech Republic) Petra Ševčíková	(Germany) Anne Slosharek	
Bahnen-Tournee Darmstadt; Germany 16 May 2024 CL2	Men's Omnium	(Germany) Moritz Augenstein	(Germany) Max Briese	(Italy) Nicolò De Lisi	
Bahnen-Tournee Darmstadt; Germany 16 May 2024 CL2	Women's Scratch	(Norway) Nora Tveit	(Czech Republic) Petra Ševčíková	(Germany) Fabienne Jährig	
JICF International Track Cup; Japan 18–19 May 2024 CL2
JICF International Track Cup; Japan 18–19 May 2024 CL2	Keirin	(Japan) Minato Nakaishi	(Japan) Ichiro Morita	(Hong Kong) Cheuk Hei To	
JICF International Track Cup; Japan 18–19 May 2024 CL2	Keirin	(Japan) Noa Obara	(Japan) Haruka Nakazawa	(China) Chen Lulu	
JICF International Track Cup; Japan 18–19 May 2024 CL2	Madison	(Australia) Graeme Frislie (Australia) Kurt Eather	(Hong Kong) Tso Kai-kwong (Hong Kong) Chu Tsun-wai	(China) Mengjie Wang (China) Pei Zhengyu	
JICF International Track Cup; Japan 18–19 May 2024 CL2	Madison	(Japan) Tsuyaka Uchino (Japan) Maho Kakita	(Japan) Mizuki Ikeda (China) Zhou Menghan	(Hong Kong) Lee Sze Wing (Hong Kong) Wing Yee Leung	
JICF International Track Cup; Japan 18–19 May 2024 CL2	Omnium	(Australia) Graeme Frislie	(Australia) Kurt Eather	(China) Yang Yang	
JICF International Track Cup; Japan 18–19 May 2024 CL2	Omnium	(Japan) Tsuyaka Uchino	(Japan) Maho Kakita	(Hong Kong) Lee Sze Wing	
JICF International Track Cup; Japan 18–19 May 2024 CL2	Sprint	(Chinese Taipei) Kang Shih-feng	(Australia) Ryan Elliott	(Japan) Minato Nakaishi	
JICF International Track Cup; Japan 18–19 May 2024 CL2	Sprint	(Japan) Noa Obara	(Hong Kong) Yeung Cho-yiu	(Japan) Haruka Nakazawa	
Bahnen-Tournee; Germany 18–19 May 2024 CL1
Bahnen-Tournee; Germany 18–19 May 2024 CL1	Elimination Race	(Germany) Benjamin Boos	(Switzerland) Claudio Imhof	(Austria) Maximilian Schmidbauer	
Bahnen-Tournee; Germany 18–19 May 2024 CL1	Elimination Race	(Czech Republic) Petra Ševčíková	(Switzerland) Jasmin Liechti	(Norway) Nora Tveit	
Bahnen-Tournee; Germany 18–19 May 2024 CL1	Keirin	(Italy) Stefano Moro	(India) Esow Alben	(Hungary) Sándor Szalontay	
Bahnen-Tournee; Germany 18–19 May 2024 CL1	Keirin	(Canada) Emy Savard	(Germany) Katharina Paggel	(Germany) Victoria Stelling	
Bahnen-Tournee; Germany 18–19 May 2024 CL1	Scratch	(Germany) Benjamin Boos	(Ukraine) Roman Gladysh	(Slovakia) Martin Chren	
Bahnen-Tournee; Germany 18–19 May 2024 CL1	Scratch	(Czech Republic) Petra Ševčíková	(Switzerland) Lorena Leu	(Denmark) Ellen Hjøllund Klinge	
Bahnen-Tournee; Germany 18–19 May 2024 CL1	Sprint	(Italy) Mattia Predomo	(India) Ronaldo Laitonjam	(Australia) Maxwell Liebeknecht	
Bahnen-Tournee; Germany 18–19 May 2024 CL1	Sprint	(Canada) Emy Savard	(Germany) Sina Temmen	(Germany) Victoria Stelling	
Bahnen-Tournee; Germany 18–19 May 2024 CL1	Men's Madison	(Germany) Moritz Malcharek (Germany) Moritz Augenstein	(Czech Republic) Denis Rugovac (Czech Republic) Jan Voneš	(Austria) Maximilian Schmidbauer (Austria) Raphael Kokas	
Bahnen-Tournee; Germany 18–19 May 2024 CL1	Omnium	(Germany) Moritz Malcharek	(Venezuela) Clever Martínez	(Germany) Moritz Augenstein	
Bahnen-Tournee; Germany 18–19 May 2024 CL1	Omnium	(Switzerland) Jasmin Liechti	(Norway) Nora Tveit	(Czech Republic) Petra Ševčíková	
Bahnen-Tournee; Germany 18–19 May 2024 CL1	Men's Points Race	(Ukraine) Vitaliy Hryniv	(Germany) Benjamin Boos	(Venezuela) Clever Martínez	
Finale-Tournee; Germany 20 May 2024 CL1
Finale-Tournee; Germany 20 May 2024 CL1	Elimination Race	(Germany) Benjamin Boos	(Germany) Moritz Augenstein	(Spain) Mario Anguela	
Finale-Tournee; Germany 20 May 2024 CL1	Elimination Race	(Czech Republic) Petra Ševčíková	(Spain) Laura Rodríguez Cordero	(Switzerland) Lorena Leu	
Finale-Tournee; Germany 20 May 2024 CL1	Women's Keirin	(Germany) Emma Hinze	(Germany) Lea Friedrich	(Belgium) Nicky Degrendele	
Finale-Tournee; Germany 20 May 2024 CL1	Men's Madison	(Germany) Moritz Malcharek (Germany) Moritz Augenstein	(Austria) Maximilian Schmidbauer (Austria) Raphael Kokas	(Czech Republic) Denis Rugovac (Czech Republic) Jan Voneš	
Finale-Tournee; Germany 20 May 2024 CL1	Scratch	(Germany) Moritz Augenstein	(Switzerland) Nicolò De Lisi	(Belgium) Stan Dens	
Finale-Tournee; Germany 20 May 2024 CL1	Scratch	(Switzerland) Lorena Leu	(Belgium) Lani Wittevrongel	(Denmark) Ellen Hjøllund Klinge	
Festival International Piste Toulon Provence Méditerranée; France 25–26 May 2024 CL2
Festival International Piste Toulon Provence Méditerranée; France 25–26 May 2024 CL2	Keirin	(Italy) Stefano Moro	(France) Sébastien Vigier	(France) Oscar Caron	
Festival International Piste Toulon Provence Méditerranée; France 25–26 May 2024 CL2	Keirin	(United Kingdom) Emma Finucane	(France) Taky Marie-Divine Kouamé	(France) Julie Michaux	
Festival International Piste Toulon Provence Méditerranée; France 25–26 May 2024 CL2	Madison	(France) Dorian Carreau (France) Guillaume Monmasson	(Switzerland) Damien Fortis (Switzerland) Matteo Constant	(France) Julien Robic (France) Hugo Pommelet	
Festival International Piste Toulon Provence Méditerranée; France 25–26 May 2024 CL2	Madison	(France) Léane Tabu (France) Violette Demay	(France) Léonie Mahieu (France) Constance Marchand	(France) Aurore Pernollet (France) Mélanie Dupin	
Festival International Piste Toulon Provence Méditerranée; France 25–26 May 2024 CL2	Omnium	(Switzerland) Matteo Constant	(France) Dorian Carreau	(Spain) Jaime Romero Villanueva	
Festival International Piste Toulon Provence Méditerranée; France 25–26 May 2024 CL2	Omnium	(Egypt) Ebtissam Mohamed	(France) Constance Marchand	(France) Ilona Rouat	
Festival International Piste Toulon Provence Méditerranée; France 25–26 May 2024 CL2	Sprint	(Trinidad and Tobago) Nicholas Paul	(France) Sébastien Vigier	(Italy) Stefano Moro	
Festival International Piste Toulon Provence Méditerranée; France 25–26 May 2024 CL2	Sprint	(United Kingdom) Emma Finucane	(United Kingdom) Katy Marchant	(United Kingdom) Sophie Capewell	
Festival International Piste Toulon Provence Méditerranée; France 25–26 May 2024 CL2	Scratch	(France) Dorian Carreau	(Algeria) Yacine Chalel	(Switzerland) Matteo Constant	
Festival International Piste Toulon Provence Méditerranée; France 25–26 May 2024 CL2	Scratch	(Egypt) Ebtissam Mohamed	(France) Constance Marchand	(France) Heïdi Gaugain	
Speed Paradise Grand Prix; Trinidad and Tobago 30 May 2024 CL2
Speed Paradise Grand Prix; Trinidad and Tobago 30 May 2024 CL2	Elimination Race				
Speed Paradise Grand Prix; Trinidad and Tobago 30 May 2024 CL2	Sprint	(United States) Evan Boone	(United States) Dalton Walters	(United States) Geneway Tang	
Speed Paradise Grand Prix; Trinidad and Tobago 30 May 2024 CL2	Sprint	(United States) Emily Hayes	(United States) Kayla Hankins	(Trinidad and Tobago) Makaira Wallace	
Speed Paradise Grand Prix; Trinidad and Tobago 30 May 2024 CL2	Men's Points Race				
Speed Paradise Grand Prix; Trinidad and Tobago 30 May 2024 CL2	Scratch				
Speed Paradise Grand Prix; Trinidad and Tobago 30 May 2024 CL2	Madison				
Speed Paradise Grand Prix; Trinidad and Tobago 30 May 2024 CL2	Men's Omnium	(Peru) Hugo Ruiz	(Venezuela) Clever Martínez	(Trinidad and Tobago) Akil Campbell	
Speed Paradise Grand Prix; Trinidad and Tobago 30 May 2024 CL2	Keirin	(United States) Evan Boone	(Trinidad and Tobago) Zion Pulido	(Trinidad and Tobago) Kyle Caraby	
Speed Paradise Grand Prix; Trinidad and Tobago 30 May 2024 CL2	Keirin	(United States) Kayla Hankins	(Jamaica) Dahlia Palmer	(United States) Emily Hayes	
33. Großer Preis von Deutschland im Sprint; Germany 31 May – 1 June 2024 CL1
33. Großer Preis von Deutschland im Sprint; Germany 31 May – 1 June 2024 CL1	Keirin	(Poland) Mateusz Rudyk	(Colombia) Kevin Quintero	(Colombia) Cristian Ortega	
33. Großer Preis von Deutschland im Sprint; Germany 31 May – 1 June 2024 CL1	Keirin	(United Kingdom) Rhian Edmunds	(Germany) Emma Hinze	(Netherlands) Kimberly Kalee	
33. Großer Preis von Deutschland im Sprint; Germany 31 May – 1 June 2024 CL1	Sprint	(Poland) Mateusz Rudyk	(United Kingdom) Joseph Truman	(Colombia) Cristian Ortega	
33. Großer Preis von Deutschland im Sprint; Germany 31 May – 1 June 2024 CL1	Sprint	(Germany) Emma Hinze	(Germany) Pauline Grabosch	(Germany) Lea Friedrich	
33. Großer Preis von Deutschland im Sprint; Germany 31 May – 1 June 2024 CL1	Team Sprint	(United Kingdom) Jack Carlin (United Kingdom) Hamish Turnbull (United Kingdom) Ed Lowe	(Germany) Luca Spiegel (Germany) Maximilian Dörnbach (Germany) Stefan Bötticher	(Colombia) Kevin Quintero (Colombia) Santiago Ramírez (Colombia) Cristian Ortega	
33. Großer Preis von Deutschland im Sprint; Germany 31 May – 1 June 2024 CL1	Team Sprint	(United Kingdom) Rhian Edmunds (United Kingdom) Iona Moir (United Kingdom) Rhianna Parris-Smith	(Germany) Clara Schneider (Germany) Lara-Sophie Jäger (Germany) Stella Müller	(Colombia) Martha Bayona (Colombia) Yarli Mosquera (Colombia) Stefany Cuadrado	
Dublin Track International; Ireland 1–2 June 2024 CL2
Dublin Track International; Ireland 1–2 June 2024 CL2	Keirin	(Argentina) Mateo Marasas	(Republic of Ireland) Sean Curtis	(United Kingdom) Joshua Dunham	
Dublin Track International; Ireland 1–2 June 2024 CL2	Keirin	(Belgium) Zoë Wolfs	(Republic of Ireland) Deirbhle Ivory	(United Kingdom) Miriam Jessett	
Dublin Track International; Ireland 1–2 June 2024 CL2	Madison	(United Kingdom) James Ambrose-Parish (Latvia) George Nemilostivijs	(Sweden) Gustav Johansson (Sweden) Neo Viking	(Republic of Ireland) Cian Keogh (United Kingdom) Matthew Gibson	
Dublin Track International; Ireland 1–2 June 2024 CL2	Madison	(Republic of Ireland) Aoife O'Brien (Republic of Ireland) Erin Grace Creighton	(Republic of Ireland) Gabriella Homer (United Kingdom) Miriam Jessett	(Republic of Ireland) Ellen Ni Cleirigh; Annalise Murphy	
Dublin Track International; Ireland 1–2 June 2024 CL2	Omnium	(Latvia) George Nemilostivijs	(United Kingdom) James Ambrose-Parish	(Sweden) Gustav Johansson	
Dublin Track International; Ireland 1–2 June 2024 CL2	Omnium	(United Kingdom) Miriam Jessett	(South Africa) S'annara Grove	(Republic of Ireland) Erin Grace Creighton	
Dublin Track International; Ireland 1–2 June 2024 CL2	Sprint	(Argentina) Mateo Marasas	(United Kingdom) Joshua Dunham	(Republic of Ireland) Dmitri Griffin	
Dublin Track International; Ireland 1–2 June 2024 CL2	Sprint	(Republic of Ireland) Deirbhle Ivory	(Belgium) Zoë Wolfs	(Republic of Ireland) Caoimhe Seymour	
Dublin Track International; Ireland 1–2 June 2024 CL2	Scratch	(Latvia) George Nemilostivijs	(United Kingdom) James Ambrose-Parish	(Republic of Ireland) Ryan Byrne	
Dublin Track International; Ireland 1–2 June 2024 CL2	Scratch	(Republic of Ireland) Erin Grace Creighton	(Republic of Ireland) Aoife O'Brien	(Republic of Ireland) Annalise Murphy	
Carnival Of Speed Grand Prix; Trinidad and Tobago 1–2 June 2024 CL2
Carnival Of Speed Grand Prix; Trinidad and Tobago 1–2 June 2024 CL2	Sprint	(United States) Evan Boone	(United States) Dalton Walters	(Trinidad and Tobago) Zion Pulido	
Carnival Of Speed Grand Prix; Trinidad and Tobago 1–2 June 2024 CL2	Sprint	(United States) Kayla Hankins	(United States) Emily Hayes	(Jamaica) Dahlia Palmer	
Carnival Of Speed Grand Prix; Trinidad and Tobago 1–2 June 2024 CL2	Men's Omnium	(Peru) Hugo Ruiz	(Venezuela) Clever Martínez	(Trinidad and Tobago) Akil Campbell	
Carnival Of Speed Grand Prix; Trinidad and Tobago 1–2 June 2024 CL2	Men's Scratch	(Trinidad and Tobago) Tariq Woods	(Trinidad and Tobago) Liam Trepte	(Peru) Hugo Ruiz	
Carnival Of Speed Grand Prix; Trinidad and Tobago 1–2 June 2024 CL2	Keirin	(United States) Evan Boone	(United States) Dalton Walters	(Trinidad and Tobago) Njisane Phillip	
Carnival Of Speed Grand Prix; Trinidad and Tobago 1–2 June 2024 CL2	Keirin	(United States) Kayla Hankins	(Jamaica) Dahlia Palmer	(United States) Emily Hayes	
Carnival Of Speed Grand Prix; Trinidad and Tobago 1–2 June 2024 CL2	Men's Elimination Race	(Trinidad and Tobago) Akil Campbell	(Peru) Hugo Ruiz	(India) Harshveer Sekhon	
GP Brno track cycling Czech Republic 7–8 June 2024 CL1
GP Brno track cycling Czech Republic 7–8 June 2024 CL1	Keirin	(Poland) Eliasz Bednarek	(Italy) Stefano Moro	(Poland) Konrad Burawski	
GP Brno track cycling Czech Republic 7–8 June 2024 CL1	Keirin	(United Kingdom) Rhian Edmunds	(Germany) Clara Schneider	(Netherlands) Lonneke Geraerts	
GP Brno track cycling Czech Republic 7–8 June 2024 CL1	Madison	(Belgium) Jules Hesters (Belgium) Lindsay De Vylder	(Austria) Raphael Kokas (Austria) Tim Wafler	(Denmark) Robin Juel Skivild (Denmark) Anders Fynbo	
GP Brno track cycling Czech Republic 7–8 June 2024 CL1	Madison	(Poland) Tamara Szalińska (Poland) Maja Tracka	(Poland) Olga Wankiewicz (Poland) Patrycja Lorkowska	(Czech Republic) Jarmila Machačová (Czech Republic) Petra Ševčíková	
GP Brno track cycling Czech Republic 7–8 June 2024 CL1	Omnium	(Belgium) Lindsay De Vylder	(Poland) Alan Banaszek	(Poland) Filip Prokopyszyn	
GP Brno track cycling Czech Republic 7–8 June 2024 CL1	Omnium	(Egypt) Ebtissam Mohamed	(Poland) Olga Wankiewicz	(Poland) Maja Tracka	
GP Brno track cycling Czech Republic 7–8 June 2024 CL1	Sprint	(Italy) Mattia Predomo	(United Kingdom) Harry Radford	(Poland) Konrad Burawski	
GP Brno track cycling Czech Republic 7–8 June 2024 CL1	Sprint	(Germany) Clara Schneider	(United Kingdom) Iona Moir	(United Kingdom) Milly Tanner	
South London Grand Prix; United Kingdom 13–14 June 2024 CL2
South London Grand Prix; United Kingdom 13–14 June 2024 CL2	Men's Elimination Race	(United Kingdom) Alec Briggs	(United Kingdom) Jacob Vaughan	(United Kingdom) James Ambrose-Parish	
South London Grand Prix; United Kingdom 13–14 June 2024 CL2	Men's Keirin	(United Kingdom) Hayden Norris	(United Kingdom) Harry Ledingham-Horn	(Argentina) Lucas Oscar Vilar	
South London Grand Prix; United Kingdom 13–14 June 2024 CL2	Men's Madison	(United Kingdom) Alec Briggs (United Kingdom) Joe Holt	(United Kingdom) Tom Ward (United Kingdom) William Perrett	(Latvia) George Nemilostivijs (United Kingdom) James Ambrose-Parish	
South London Grand Prix; United Kingdom 13–14 June 2024 CL2	Women's Omnium	(United Kingdom) Ella Barnwell	(United Kingdom) Cat Ferguson	(United Kingdom) Miriam Jessett	
South London Grand Prix; United Kingdom 13–14 June 2024 CL2	Men's Scratch	(United Kingdom) Tom Ward	(Sweden) Gustav Johansson	(Latvia) George Nemilostivijs	
South London Grand Prix; United Kingdom 13–14 June 2024 CL2	Women's Sprint	(United Kingdom) Milly Tanner	(United Kingdom) Lauren Bell	(United Kingdom) Rhian Edmunds	
2.Lauf Brandenburger Sprint Cup; Germany 21–22 June 2024 CL2
2.Lauf Brandenburger Sprint Cup; Germany 21–22 June 2024 CL2	Keirin	(Poland) Mateusz Rudyk	(Poland) Daniel Rochna	(Germany) Maximilian Dörnbach	
2.Lauf Brandenburger Sprint Cup; Germany 21–22 June 2024 CL2	Keirin	(Germany) Lea Friedrich	(Poland) Marlena Karwacka	(Germany) Emma Hinze	
2.Lauf Brandenburger Sprint Cup; Germany 21–22 June 2024 CL2	Sprint	(Poland) Mateusz Rudyk	(Germany) Maximilian Dörnbach	(Germany) Stefan Bötticher	
2.Lauf Brandenburger Sprint Cup; Germany 21–22 June 2024 CL2	Sprint	(Germany) Lea Friedrich	(Germany) Emma Hinze	(Germany) Alessa-Catriona Pröpster	
Sofia Track Cup I Bulgaria 26 June CL2
Sofia Track Cup I Bulgaria 26 June CL2	Men's Elimination Race	(Georgia (country)) Giorgi Khorguani	(Georgia (country)) Avtandil Piranishvili	(Bulgaria) Martin Popov	
Sofia Track Cup I Bulgaria 26 June CL2	Men's Individual Pursuit	(Latvia) Vitālijs Korņilovs	(Bulgaria) Martin Popov	(Bulgaria) Ventsislav Venkov	
Sofia Track Cup I Bulgaria 26 June CL2	Men's Time Trial	(Bulgaria) Miroslav Minchev	(Bulgaria) Vasil Popov	(Georgia (country)) Giorgi Khorguani	
Sofia Track Cup I Bulgaria 26 June CL2	Men's Sprint	(Bulgaria) Miroslav Minchev	(Bulgaria) Vasil Popov	(Georgia (country)) Avtandil Piranishvili	
Sofia Track Cup II; Bulgaria 27 June CL2
Sofia Track Cup II; Bulgaria 27 June CL2	Men's Keirin	(Georgia (country)) Avtandil Piranishvili	(Bulgaria) Vasil Popov	(Georgia (country)) Valeri Mamulashvili	
Sofia Track Cup II; Bulgaria 27 June CL2	Men's Scratch	(Bulgaria) Vasil Popov	(Georgia (country)) Avtandil Piranishvili	(Georgia (country)) Giorgi Khorguani	
Sofia Track Cup II; Bulgaria 27 June CL2	Men's Points Race	(Bulgaria) Vasil Popov	(Bulgaria) Martin Popov	(Georgia (country)) Avtandil Piranishvili	
Sofia Track Cup II; Bulgaria 27 June CL2	Men's Team Sprint	(Bulgaria) Miroslav Minchev (Bulgaria) Nikolay Stanchev (Bulgaria) Dragomir Nikolov	(Georgia (country)) Avtandil Piranishvili (Georgia (country)) Valeri Mamulashvili (Georgia (country)) Giorgi Khorguani	(Bulgaria) Ivelin Tsankov (Bulgaria) Ventsislav Venkov (Bulgaria) Alexander Popov	
Belgian Open Track meeting Belgium 28–30 June 2024 CL1
Belgian Open Track meeting Belgium 28–30 June 2024 CL1	Men's Individual Pursuit	(Belgium) Noah Vandenbranden	(Netherlands) Brian Megens	(Belgium) Thibaut Bernard	
Belgian Open Track meeting Belgium 28–30 June 2024 CL1	Keirin	(France) Sébastien Vigier	(France) Rayan Helal	(Poland) Rafał Sarnecki	
Belgian Open Track meeting Belgium 28–30 June 2024 CL1	Keirin	(Belgium) Nicky Degrendele	(France) Taky Marie-Divine Kouamé	(Poland) Urszula Łoś	
Belgian Open Track meeting Belgium 28–30 June 2024 CL1	Madison	(New Zealand) Aaron Gate (New Zealand) Campbell Stewart	(France) Thomas Boudat (France) Benjamin Thomas	(Belgium) Fabio Van den Bossche (Belgium) Lindsay De Vylder	
Belgian Open Track meeting Belgium 28–30 June 2024 CL1	Madison	(Italy) Chiara Consonni (Italy) Vittoria Guazzini	(Netherlands) Lisa van Belle (Netherlands) Maike van der Duin	(Australia) Alexandra Manly (Australia) Georgia Baker	
Belgian Open Track meeting Belgium 28–30 June 2024 CL1	Sprint	(Israel) Mikhail Iakovlev	(Poland) Mateusz Rudyk	(France) Rayan Helal	
Belgian Open Track meeting Belgium 28–30 June 2024 CL1	Sprint	(France) Taky Marie-Divine Kouamé	(Belgium) Nicky Degrendele	(Poland) Nikola Sibiak	
Belgian Open Track meeting Belgium 28–30 June 2024 CL1	Omnium	(New Zealand) Aaron Gate	(Belgium) Fabio Van den Bossche	(United Kingdom) Ethan Hayter	
Belgian Open Track meeting Belgium 28–30 June 2024 CL1	Omnium	(Belgium) Lotte Kopecky	(New Zealand) Ally Wollaston	(Republic of Ireland) Lara Gillespie	
Belgian Open Track meeting Belgium 28–30 June 2024 CL1	Women's Points Race	(Italy) Chiara Consonni	(New Zealand) Ally Wollaston	(Belgium) Lotte Kopecky	
Belgian Open Track meeting Belgium 28–30 June 2024 CL1	Women's Scratch	(Italy) Letizia Paternoster	(Czech Republic) Petra Ševčíková	(Norway) Anita Stenberg	
Belgian Open Track meeting Belgium 28–30 June 2024 CL1	Women's 500 m Time Trial	(Poland) Marlena Karwacka	(Poland) Urszula Łoś	(France) Taky Marie-Divine Kouamé	
Fiorenzuola International Track Women and Men; Italy 29 June – 4 July 2024 CL1
Fiorenzuola International Track Women and Men; Italy 29 June – 4 July 2024 CL1	Elimination Race	(Switzerland) Nicolò De Lisi	(Australia) Graeme Frislie	(Italy) Mattia Pinazzi	
Fiorenzuola International Track Women and Men; Italy 29 June – 4 July 2024 CL1	Elimination Race	(Italy) Silvia Zanardi	(Hong Kong) Lee Sze Wing	(Poland) Maja Tracka	
Fiorenzuola International Track Women and Men; Italy 29 June – 4 July 2024 CL1	Omnium	(France) Benjamin Thomas	(Italy) Elia Viviani	(Australia) Liam Walsh	
Fiorenzuola International Track Women and Men; Italy 29 June – 4 July 2024 CL1	Omnium	(Mexico) Victoria Velasco	(Italy) Sara Fiorin	(Hong Kong) Lee Sze Wing	
Fiorenzuola International Track Women and Men; Italy 29 June – 4 July 2024 CL1	Points Race	Ivan Novolodskii	(Italy) Juan David Sierra	(Australia) Liam Walsh	
Fiorenzuola International Track Women and Men; Italy 29 June – 4 July 2024 CL1	Points Race	(Italy) Martina Alzini	(Hong Kong) Lee Sze Wing	(Italy) Silvia Zanardi	
Fiorenzuola International Track Women and Men; Italy 29 June – 4 July 2024 CL1	Scratch	(Australia) Liam Walsh	(Italy) Matteo Donegà	Lev Gonov	
Fiorenzuola International Track Women and Men; Italy 29 June – 4 July 2024 CL1	Scratch	(Hong Kong) Lee Sze Wing	(Mexico) Victoria Velasco	(Australia) Keira Will	
Fiorenzuola International Track Women and Men; Italy 29 June – 4 July 2024 CL1	Madison	Lev Gonov; Ivan Smirnov	Viktor Bugaenko; Daniil Zarakovskiy	(Italy) Davide Boscaro (Italy) Michele Scartezzini	
Fiorenzuola International Track Women and Men; Italy 29 June – 4 July 2024 CL1	Madison	(Czech Republic) Gabriela Bártová (Czech Republic) Barbora Němcová	(Australia) Sally Carter (Australia) Keira Will	(Poland) Patrycja Lorkowska (Poland) Maja Tracka	
6 Sere Internazionale Città di Pordenone; Italy 15–20 July 2024 CL1
6 Sere Internazionale Città di Pordenone; Italy 15–20 July 2024 CL1	Men's Madison	(United States) Graeme Frislie (Australia) Liam Walsh	(Italy) Niccolò Galli (Italy) Davide Boscaro	(Italy) Matteo Donegà (Italy) Matteo Fiorin	
6 Sere Internazionale Città di Pordenone; Italy 15–20 July 2024 CL1	Elimination Race	(Italy) Matteo Fiorin	(United Kingdom) James Ambrose-Parish	(Argentina) Facundo Gabriel Lezica	
6 Sere Internazionale Città di Pordenone; Italy 15–20 July 2024 CL1	Elimination Race	(Greece) Argyro Milaki	(Ukraine) Viktoriia Yaroshenko	(Italy) Giorgia Serena	
6 Sere Internazionale Città di Pordenone; Italy 15–20 July 2024 CL1	Men's Omnium	(Italy) Matteo Donegà	(United States) Graeme Frislie	(Argentina) Facundo Gabriel Lezica	
6 Sere Internazionale Città di Pordenone; Italy 15–20 July 2024 CL1	Points Race	(United States) Peter Moore	(Slovakia) Martin Chren	(Argentina) Facundo Gabriel Lezica	
6 Sere Internazionale Città di Pordenone; Italy 15–20 July 2024 CL1	Points Race	(Greece) Argyro Milaki	(Ukraine) Viktoriia Yaroshenko	(United Kingdom) Dannielle Watkinson	
6 Sere Internazionale Città di Pordenone; Italy 15–20 July 2024 CL1	Men's Scratch	(Latvia) George Nemilostivijs	(Italy) Matteo Donegà	(Slovakia) Martin Chren	
Athens Track Grand Prix; Greece 31 July 2024 CL2
Athens Track Grand Prix; Greece 31 July 2024 CL2	Women's Elimination Race	(Greece) Argyro Milaki	(Slovakia) Alžbeta Bačíková	(Slovakia) Anna Ržoncová	
Athens Track Grand Prix; Greece 31 July 2024 CL2	Keirin	(Greece) Konstantinos Livanos	(Greece) Miltiadis Charovas	(Greece) Spyridon Theocharis	
Athens Track Grand Prix; Greece 31 July 2024 CL2	Men's Scratch	(Poland) Filip Prokopyszyn	(Greece) Zisis Soulios	(Greece) Stefanos Klokas	
Athens Track Grand Prix; Greece 31 July 2024 CL2	Omnium	(Greece) Zisis Soulios	(Greece) Nikolaos Michail Drakos	(Greece) Nikolaos Manthos	
Athens Track Grand Prix; Greece 31 July 2024 CL2	Omnium	(Greece) Argyro Milaki	(Slovakia) Alžbeta Bačíková	(Slovakia) Anna Ržoncová	

== 2024 Summer Olympics ==
=== Men's ===
Event	Gold	Silver	Bronze
Sprint	Harrie Lavreysen; Netherlands	Matthew Richardson; Australia	Jack Carlin; Great Britain
Team sprint	Netherlands; Roy van den Berg; Harrie Lavreysen; Jeffrey Hoogland	Great Britain; Ed Lowe; Hamish Turnbull; Jack Carlin	Australia; Leigh Hoffman; Matthew Richardson; Matthew Glaetzer
Keirin	Harrie Lavreysen; Netherlands	Matthew Richardson; Australia	Matthew Glaetzer; Australia
Madison	Portugal; Iúri Leitão; Rui Oliveira	Italy; Simone Consonni; Elia Viviani	Denmark; Niklas Larsen; Michael Mørkøv
Omnium	Benjamin Thomas; France	Iúri Leitão; Portugal	Fabio Van den Bossche; Belgium
Team pursuit	Australia; Oliver Bleddyn; Sam Welsford; Conor Leahy; Kelland O'Brien	Great Britain; Ethan Hayter; Daniel Bigham; Charlie Tanfield; Ethan Vernon; Oliver Wood	Italy; Simone Consonni; Filippo Ganna; Francesco Lamon; Jonathan Milan

=== Women's ===
Event	Gold	Silver	Bronze
Sprint	Ellesse Andrews; New Zealand	Lea Friedrich; Germany	Emma Finucane; Great Britain
Team sprint	Great Britain; Katy Marchant; Sophie Capewell; Emma Finucane	New Zealand; Rebecca Petch; Shaane Fulton; Ellesse Andrews	Germany; Pauline Grabosch; Emma Hinze; Lea Sophie Friedrich
Keirin	Ellesse Andrews; New Zealand	Hetty van de Wouw; Netherlands	Emma Finucane; Great Britain
Madison	Italy; Chiara Consonni; Vittoria Guazzini	Great Britain; Elinor Barker; Neah Evans	Netherlands; Maike van der Duin; Lisa van Belle
Omnium	Jennifer Valente; United States	Daria Pikulik; Poland	Ally Wollaston; New Zealand
Team pursuit	United States; Jennifer Valente; Lily Williams; Chloé Dygert; Kristen Faulkner	New Zealand; Ally Wollaston; Bryony Botha; Emily Shearman; Nicole Shields	Great Britain; Elinor Barker; Josie Knight; Anna Morris; Jessica Roberts

== National Championships ==
=== Individual Pursuit ===
Date	Venue	Podium (Men)		Podium (Women)	
4–7 January 2024	France; Saint-Quentin-en-Yvelines	1	Benjamin Thomas	1	Marion Borras
4–7 January 2024	France; Saint-Quentin-en-Yvelines	2	Corentin Ermenault	2	Valentine Fortin
4–7 January 2024	France; Saint-Quentin-en-Yvelines	3	Thomas Denis	3	Victoire Berteau
5–7 January 2024	Canada; Milton	1	Chris Ernst	1	Jenna Nestman
5–7 January 2024	Canada; Milton	2	Carson Mattern	2	Ngaire Barraclough
5–7 January 2024	Canada; Milton	3	Cameron Fitzmaurice	3	Kiara Lylyk
25 January 2024	Denmark; Ballerup	1	Oskar Winkler	1	
25 January 2024	Denmark; Ballerup	2	Matias Malmberg	2	
25 January 2024	Denmark; Ballerup	3	Conrad Haugsted	3	
3 February 2024	Slovenia; Novo Mesto	1	Natan Gregorčič	1	
3 February 2024	Slovenia; Novo Mesto	2	Jaka Marolt	2	
3 February 2024	Slovenia; Novo Mesto	3	Matic Žumer	3	
23 February 2024	Spain; Galapagar	1	Francesc Bennassar	1	Ziortza Isasi
23 February 2024	Spain; Galapagar	2	Álvaro Navas	2	Mireia Benito
23 February 2024	Spain; Galapagar	3	Eloy Teruel	3	Isabel Ferreres
23–25 February 2024	United Kingdom; Manchester	1	Michael Gill	1	Kate Richardson
23–25 February 2024	United Kingdom; Manchester	2	William Roberts	2	Francesca Hall
23–25 February 2024	United Kingdom; Manchester	3	Matthew Brennan	3	Izzy Sharp
1–3 March 2024	Bolivia; Santa Cruz de la Sierra	1		1	
1–3 March 2024	Bolivia; Santa Cruz de la Sierra	2		2	
1–3 March 2024	Bolivia; Santa Cruz de la Sierra	3		3	
1–5 March 2024	Australia; Brisbane	1	Conor Leahy	1	Felicity Wilson-Haffenden
1–5 March 2024	Australia; Brisbane	2	James Moriarty	2	Claudia Marcks
1–5 March 2024	Australia; Brisbane	3	John Carter	3	Keira Will
1–5 March 2024	New Zealand; Cambridge	1	Kyle Aitken	1	Bryony Botha
1–5 March 2024	New Zealand; Cambridge	2	Nick Kergozou	2	Sami Donnelly
1–5 March 2024	New Zealand; Cambridge	3	Bailey O'Donnell	3	Prudence Fowler
6–8 March 2024	Israel; Tel Aviv	1	Vladislav Logionov	1	Noa Shweky
6–8 March 2024	Israel; Tel Aviv	2	Guy Timor	2	
6–8 March 2024	Israel; Tel Aviv	3	Amit Keinan	3	
21–25 March 2024	South Africa; Cape Town	1	Joshua Dike	1	
21–25 March 2024	South Africa; Cape Town	2	Matthew Lester	2	
21–25 March 2024	South Africa; Cape Town	3	Carl Bonthuys	3	
25–29 March 2024	Uzbekistan; Tashkent	1	Danil Evdokimov	1	Evgeniya Golotina
25–29 March 2024	Uzbekistan; Tashkent	2	Artyom Talizenkov	2	Samira Ismailova
25–29 March 2024	Uzbekistan; Tashkent	3	Abdulkhamid Tuychiev	3	Kseniya Li
30–31 March 2024	United Arab Emirates; Sharjah	1	Mohammad Al Mutaiwei	1	
30–31 March 2024	United Arab Emirates; Sharjah	2	Mohammed Yousef Al Mansouri	2	
30–31 March 2024	United Arab Emirates; Sharjah	3	Saif Mayoof Al Kaabi	3	
20–21 April 2024	El Salvador; San Salvador	1	Luciano Venanzi	1	
20–21 April 2024	El Salvador; San Salvador	2	Wilber Martínez	2	
20–21 April 2024	El Salvador; San Salvador	3	Marco Antonio Hernández Sales	3	
16–19 May 2024	Trinidad and Tobago; Couva	1	Tariq Woods	1	
16–19 May 2024	Trinidad and Tobago; Couva	2	Akil Campbell	2	
16–19 May 2024	Trinidad and Tobago; Couva	3	Liam Trepte	3	
20–24 May 2024	Malaysia; Nilai	1	New Joe Lau	1	Zhen Yi Yeong
20–24 May 2024	Malaysia; Nilai	2	Abdul Azim Aliyas	2	Ci Hui Nyo
20–24 May 2024	Malaysia; Nilai	3	Zulhelmi Zainal	3	Khairunnisa Aleeya Saifulnizam
3–7 July 2024	Kazakhstan; Astana	1	Alisher Zhumakan	1	Rinata Sultanova
3–7 July 2024	Kazakhstan; Astana	2	Ilya Karabutov	2	Anzhela Solovyeva
3–7 July 2024	Kazakhstan; Astana	3	Dmitriy Noskov	3	Violetta Kazakova
4–7 July 2024	Chinese Taipei; Taichung	1	Chang Chih-sheng	1	Huang Ting-ying
4–7 July 2024	Chinese Taipei; Taichung	2	Chien Yun-tse	2	Lai Chia-chi
4–7 July 2024	Chinese Taipei; Taichung	3	Chung Ta-wan	3	Yeh Tai-chun
10–14 July 2024	United States; Carson, California	1	Anders Johnson	1	Elizabeth Stevenson
10–14 July 2024	United States; Carson, California	2	Merrick Gallagher	2	Reagen Pattishall
10–14 July 2024	United States; Carson, California	3	Max Haggard	3	Kimberly Ann Zubris
12–14 July 2024	Thailand; Bangkok	1	Patompob Phonarjthan	1	Natthaporn Aphimot
12–14 July 2024	Thailand; Bangkok	2	Peerapong Ladngern	2	Jitraporn Saising
12–14 July 2024	Thailand; Bangkok	3	Kroekkiart Boonsaard	3	Woranan Nontakaew
20–21 July 2024	Georgia; Tbilisi	1	Avtandil Piranishvili	1	
20–21 July 2024	Georgia; Tbilisi	2	Giorgi Khorguani	2	
20–21 July 2024	Georgia; Tbilisi	3	Valeri Mamulashvili	3	
1–4 August 2024	Greece; Athens	1	Nikolaos Michail Drakos	1	Argyro Milaki
1–4 August 2024	Greece; Athens	2	Konstantinos Berdempes	2	Varvara Fasoi
1–4 August 2024	Greece; Athens	3	Dimitrios Katsimpouras	3	Vasiliki Kokkali

=== Scratch ===
Date	Venue	Podium (Men)		Podium (Women)	
5–7 January 2024	Canada; Milton	1	Michael Foley	1	Kiara Lylyk
5–7 January 2024	Canada; Milton	2	Campbell Parrish	2	Diane Snobelen
5–7 January 2024	Canada; Milton	3	Zach Webster	3	Justine Thomas
20–21 January 2024	Portugal; Anadia	1	Iúri Leitão	1	Maria Martins
20–21 January 2024	Portugal; Anadia	2	Diogo Narciso	2	Beatriz Roxo
20–21 January 2024	Portugal; Anadia	3	João Matias	3	Patrícia Duarte
25–26 January 2024	Switzerland; Grenchen	1	Alex Vogel	1	Aline Seitz
25–26 January 2024	Switzerland; Grenchen	2	Pascal Tappeiner	2	Michelle Andres
25–26 January 2024	Switzerland; Grenchen	3	Simon Vitzthum	3	Lorena Leu
3 February 2024	Slovenia; Novo Mesto	1	Žak Eržen	1	Neža Zupanič
3 February 2024	Slovenia; Novo Mesto	2	Natan Gregorčič	2	Maja Perpar
3 February 2024	Slovenia; Novo Mesto	3	Tilen Finkšt	3	
23 February 2024	Spain; Galapagar	1	Eloy Teruel	1	Eukene Larrarte
23 February 2024	Spain; Galapagar	2	José Segura	2	Ziortza Isasi
23 February 2024	Spain; Galapagar	3	Jaime Romero	3	Eva Anguela
23–25 February 2024	United Kingdom; Manchester	1	Sam Fisher	1	Jenny Holl
23–25 February 2024	United Kingdom; Manchester	2	Archie Fletcher	2	Maddie Leech
23–25 February 2024	United Kingdom; Manchester	3	William Roberts	3	Cat Ferguson
1–3 March 2024	Bolivia; Santa Cruz de la Sierra	1		1	
1–3 March 2024	Bolivia; Santa Cruz de la Sierra	2		2	
1–3 March 2024	Bolivia; Santa Cruz de la Sierra	3		3	
1–5 March 2024	Australia; Brisbane	1	Liam Walsh	1	Alli Anderson
1–5 March 2024	Australia; Brisbane	2	Stephen Hall	2	Chloe Moran
1–5 March 2024	Australia; Brisbane	3	Josh Duffy	3	Isla Carr
1–5 March 2024	New Zealand; Cambridge	1	Nick Kergozou	1	Hannah Bayard
1–5 March 2024	New Zealand; Cambridge	2	James Gardner	2	Belle Judd
1–5 March 2024	New Zealand; Cambridge	3	Daniel Bridgwater	3	Georgia Simpson
4–10 March 2024	Brazil; Curitiba	1	Lauro Chaman	1	Wellyda Rodrigues
4–10 March 2024	Brazil; Curitiba	2	Ricardo Dalamaria	2	Nicolle Borges
4–10 March 2024	Brazil; Curitiba	3	Kacio Fonseca	3	Thayná Araujo Lima
6–8 March 2024	Israel; Tel Aviv	1	Oron Argov	1	Ori Bash Dubinski
6–8 March 2024	Israel; Tel Aviv	2	Vladislav Logionov	2	Noa Shweky
6–8 March 2024	Israel; Tel Aviv	3	Amit Keinan	3	Maayan Tzur
21–25 March 2024	South Africa; Cape Town	1	Dániyal Matthews	1	
21–25 March 2024	South Africa; Cape Town	2	Joshua Dike	2	
21–25 March 2024	South Africa; Cape Town	3	Carl Bonthuys	3	
25–29 March 2024	Uzbekistan; Tashkent	1	Danil Evdokimov	1	Yana Mishinova
25–29 March 2024	Uzbekistan; Tashkent	2	Vladislav Troman	2	Sofiya Karimova
25–29 March 2024	Uzbekistan; Tashkent	3	Timur Abdukhakimov	3	Ekaterina Knebeleva
30–31 March 2024	United Arab Emirates; Sharjah	1	Ahmed Al Mansoori	1	
30–31 March 2024	United Arab Emirates; Sharjah	2	Jaber Al Mansoori	2	
30–31 March 2024	United Arab Emirates; Sharjah	3	Mohammad Al Mutaiwei	3	
20–21 April 2024	El Salvador; San Salvador	1	Luciano Venanzi	1	
20–21 April 2024	El Salvador; San Salvador	2	Marco Antonio Hernández Sales	2	
20–21 April 2024	El Salvador; San Salvador	3	Wilber Martínez	3	
16–19 May 2024	Trinidad and Tobago; Couva	1	Akil Campbell	1	
16–19 May 2024	Trinidad and Tobago; Couva	2	Tariq Woods	2	
16–19 May 2024	Trinidad and Tobago; Couva	3	Liam Trepte	3	
20–24 May 2024	Malaysia; Nilai	1	Yusri Shaari	1	Nur Aisyah Mohamad Zubir
20–24 May 2024	Malaysia; Nilai	2	Muhammad Hafiq Mohd Jafri	2	Zhen Yi Yeong
20–24 May 2024	Malaysia; Nilai	3	Muhammad Adam Hakimi Nazuan	3	Nurul Nabilah Mohd Asri
24 May 2024 (women); 30 May – 2 June 2024 (men)	Barbados; Breinigsville (United States)	1		1	Amber Joseph
24 May 2024 (women); 30 May – 2 June 2024 (men)	Barbados; Breinigsville (United States)	2		2	
24 May 2024 (women); 30 May – 2 June 2024 (men)	Barbados; Breinigsville (United States)	3		3	
24 June 2024	Denmark; Aarhus	1	Matias Malmberg	1	Ellen Hjøllund Klinge
24 June 2024	Denmark; Aarhus	2	Rasmus Bøgh Wallin	2	Julie Norman Leth
24 June 2024	Denmark; Aarhus	3	Nils Lau Nyborg Broge	3	Ida Dam Fialla
3–7 July 2024	Kazakhstan; Astana	1	Ilya Karabutov	1	Anzhela Solovyeva
3–7 July 2024	Kazakhstan; Astana	2	Alisher Zhumakan	2	Rinata Sultanova
3–7 July 2024	Kazakhstan; Astana	3	Sergey Karmazhakov	3	Makhabbat Umutzhanova
4–7 July 2024	Chinese Taipei; Taichung	1	Chen Chien-liang	1	Huang Ting-ying
4–7 July 2024	Chinese Taipei; Taichung	2	Xu Shi-ru	2	Lai Chia-chi
4–7 July 2024	Chinese Taipei; Taichung	3	Chen Tse-an	3	Chen Ching-yun
10–14 July 2024	United States; Carson, California	1	Anders Johnson	1	Chloe Patrick
10–14 July 2024	United States; Carson, California	2	Daniel Breuer	2	Colleen Gulick
10–14 July 2024	United States; Carson, California	3	Lance Abshire	3	Kimberly Ann Zubris
12–14 July 2024	Thailand; Bangkok	1	Setthawut Yordsuwan	1	Natthaporn Aphimot
12–14 July 2024	Thailand; Bangkok	2	Patompob Phonarjthan	2	Jitraporn Saising
12–14 July 2024	Thailand; Bangkok	3	Thanakom Chumphrabut	3	Woranan Nontakaew
1–4 August 2024	Greece; Athens	1	Georgios Boutopoulos	1	Eirini Papadimitrou Stampori
1–4 August 2024	Greece; Athens	2	Zisis Soulios	2	Argyro Milaki
1–4 August 2024	Greece; Athens	3	Nikolaos Michail Drakos	3	Vasiliki Kokkali

=== Keirin ===
Date	Venue	Podium (Men)		Podium (Women)	
4–7 January 2024	France; Saint-Quentin-en-Yvelines	1	Tom Derache	1	Taky Marie-Divine Kouamé
4–7 January 2024	France; Saint-Quentin-en-Yvelines	2	Rayan Helal	2	Marie-Louisa Drouode
4–7 January 2024	France; Saint-Quentin-en-Yvelines	3	Melvin Landerneau	3	Lilou Ledeme
5–7 January 2024	Canada; Milton	1	James Hedgcock	1	Jackie Boyle
5–7 January 2024	Canada; Milton	2	Nick Wammes	2	Emy Savard
5–7 January 2024	Canada; Milton	3	Ryan-Shaun Macdonald	3	Erica Rieder
23–25 February 2024	United Kingdom; Manchester	1	Hayden Norris	1	Lauren Bell
23–25 February 2024	United Kingdom; Manchester	2	Niall Monks	2	Rhian Edmunds
23–25 February 2024	United Kingdom; Manchester	3	Harvey McNaughton	3	Amy Cole
23–25 February 2024	Spain; Galapagar	1	José Moreno Sánchez	1	Helena Casas
23–25 February 2024	Spain; Galapagar	2	Ekain Jiménez	2	Tania Calvo
23–25 February 2024	Spain; Galapagar	3	Esteban Sánchez	3	Saioa Orgambide
1–3 March 2024	Bolivia; Santa Cruz de la Sierra	1		1	
1–3 March 2024	Bolivia; Santa Cruz de la Sierra	2		2	
1–3 March 2024	Bolivia; Santa Cruz de la Sierra	3		3	
1–5 March 2024	Australia; Brisbane	1	Matthew Richardson	1	Alessia McCaig
1–5 March 2024	Australia; Brisbane	2	Matthew Glaetzer	2	Kristina Clonan
1–5 March 2024	Australia; Brisbane	3	Byron Davies	3	Selina Ho
1–5 March 2024	New Zealand; Cambridge	1	Sam Dakin	1	Rebecca Petch
1–5 March 2024	New Zealand; Cambridge	2	Liam Cavanagh	2	Mya Anderson
1–5 March 2024	New Zealand; Cambridge	3	Kaio Lart	3	Sophie de Vries
4–10 March 2024	Brazil; Curitiba	1	João Victor Silva	1	Maria Tereza Müller
4–10 March 2024	Brazil; Curitiba	2	Daniel Henrique Gruer	2	Carolina Barbosa
4–10 March 2024	Brazil; Curitiba	3	Kacio Fonseca	3	Tatielle Valadares
6–8 March 2024	Israel; Tel Aviv	1	Mikhail Iakovlev	1	
6–8 March 2024	Israel; Tel Aviv	2	Niv Libner	2	
6–8 March 2024	Israel; Tel Aviv	3		3	
21–25 March 2024	South Africa; Cape Town	1	Jean Spies	1	Michaela Lubbe
21–25 March 2024	South Africa; Cape Town	2	Mitchell Sparrow	2	Ainsli de Beer
21–25 March 2024	South Africa; Cape Town	3	Bradley Gouveris	3	Amber Hindmarch
25–29 March 2024	Uzbekistan; Tashkent	1	Vladislav Jarkov	1	Anastasiya Safonova
25–29 March 2024	Uzbekistan; Tashkent	2	Timur Abdukhakimov	2	Muhlisa Ashurova
25–29 March 2024	Uzbekistan; Tashkent	3	Vagit Arslanov	3	Polina Ojereleva
20–21 April 2024	El Salvador; San Salvador	1	Wilber Martínez	1	
20–21 April 2024	El Salvador; San Salvador	2	Xavier Escamilla	2	
20–21 April 2024	El Salvador; San Salvador	3	Marco Antonio Hernández Sales	3	
16–19 May 2024	Trinidad and Tobago; Couva	1	Akil Campbell	1	Makaira Wallace
16–19 May 2024	Trinidad and Tobago; Couva	2	Zion Pulido	2	Phoebe Sandy
16–19 May 2024	Trinidad and Tobago; Couva	3	Kyle Caraby	3	Alexia Wilson
20–24 May 2024	Malaysia; Nilai	1	Azizulhasni Awang	1	Nurul Izzah Izzati Mohd Asri
20–24 May 2024	Malaysia; Nilai	2	Shah Firdaus Sahrom	2	Ann Tung Yong
20–24 May 2024	Malaysia; Nilai	3	Muhammad Ridwan Sahrom	3	Anis Amira Rosidi
7 June 2024	Barbados; Breinigsville (United States)	1		1	
7 June 2024	Barbados; Breinigsville (United States)	2		2	
7 June 2024	Barbados; Breinigsville (United States)	3		3	
28–30 June 2024	Czech Republic; Prague	1	Matěj Bohuslávek	1	Veronika Jaborníková
28–30 June 2024	Czech Republic; Prague	2	Dominik Topinka	2	Anna Jaborníková
28–30 June 2024	Czech Republic; Prague	3	Jakub Malášek	3	Sára Peterková
22–27 June 2024	South Korea; Yangyang County	1	Kang Seo-jun	1	Lee Hye-jin
22–27 June 2024	South Korea; Yangyang County	2	Kim Cheng-su	2	Kim Soo-hyun
22–27 June 2024	South Korea; Yangyang County	3	Han Sang-hyeong	3	Kwon Se-rim
3–7 July 2024	Kazakhstan; Astana	1	Sergey Ponomarev	1	Polina Bratchikova
3–7 July 2024	Kazakhstan; Astana	2	Dmitriy Rezanov	2	Diana Kossolapova
3–7 July 2024	Kazakhstan; Astana	3	Andrey Chugay	3	Anastassiya Ponomaryova
4–7 July 2024	Chinese Taipei; Taichung	1	Kang Shih-feng	1	Chuang Tzu-yun
4–7 July 2024	Chinese Taipei; Taichung	2	Tsai Chia-hsun	2	Huang Ting-ying
4–7 July 2024	Chinese Taipei; Taichung	3	Huang Ching-lun	3	Lin Chiao-yuan
6–7 July 2024	Switzerland; Oerlikon	1	Mats Poot	1	
6–7 July 2024	Switzerland; Oerlikon	2	Luca Bühlmann	2	
6–7 July 2024	Switzerland; Oerlikon	3	Nicolò De Lisi	3	
10–14 July 2024	United States; Carson, California	1	Evan Boone	1	McKenna McKee
10–14 July 2024	United States; Carson, California	2	Andrew Chu	2	Mia Deye
10–14 July 2024	United States; Carson, California	3	Corey Jameson	3	Emily Hayes
12–14 July 2024	Thailand; Bangkok	1	Norasetthada Bunma	1	Natthaporn Aphimot
12–14 July 2024	Thailand; Bangkok	2	Pongthep Tapimay	2	Woranan Nontakaew
12–14 July 2024	Thailand; Bangkok	3	Muncheth Faimuenvai	3	Aphitsara Srimongkhon
1–4 August 2024	Greece; Athens	1	Konstantinos Livanos	1	
1–4 August 2024	Greece; Athens	2	Miltiadis Charovas	2	
1–4 August 2024	Greece; Athens	3	Konstantinos Nteros	3	

=== Sprint ===
Date	Venue	Podium (Men)		Podium (Women)	
4–7 January 2024	France; Saint-Quentin-en-Yvelines	1	Rayan Helal	1	Taky Marie-Divine Kouamé
4–7 January 2024	France; Saint-Quentin-en-Yvelines	2	Tom Derache	2	Marie-Louisa Drouode
4–7 January 2024	France; Saint-Quentin-en-Yvelines	3	Luca Priore	3	Julie Michaux
5–7 January 2024	Canada; Milton	1	James Hedgcock	1	Sarah Orban
5–7 January 2024	Canada; Milton	2	Tyler Rorke	2	Jackie Boyle
5–7 January 2024	Canada; Milton	3	Nick Wammes	3	Erica Rieder
3 February 2024	Slovenia; Novo Mesto	1	Nejc Peterlin	1	
3 February 2024	Slovenia; Novo Mesto	2	Eduard Žalar	2	
3 February 2024	Slovenia; Novo Mesto	3	Marcel Gladek	3	
23–25 February 2024	Spain; Galapagar	1	José Moreno Sánchez	1	Helena Casas
23–25 February 2024	Spain; Galapagar	2	Ekain Jiménez	2	Saioa Orgambide
23–25 February 2024	Spain; Galapagar	3	Esteban Sánchez González	3	Goretti Sesma
23–25 February 2024	United Kingdom; Manchester	1	Peter Mitchell	1	Lauren Bell
23–25 February 2024	United Kingdom; Manchester	2	Marcus Hiley	2	Rhian Edmunds
23–25 February 2024	United Kingdom; Manchester	3	Harry Ledingham-Horn	3	Georgette Rand
1–5 March 2024	Australia; Brisbane	1	Matthew Richardson	1	Alessia McCaig
1–5 March 2024	Australia; Brisbane	2	Leigh Hoffman	2	Sophie Watts
1–5 March 2024	Australia; Brisbane	3	Thomas Cornish	3	Jacqui Mengler-Mohr
1–5 March 2024	New Zealand; Cambridge	1	Sam Dakin	1	Shaane Fulton
1–5 March 2024	New Zealand; Cambridge	2	Patrick Clancy	2	Sophie de Vries
1–5 March 2024	New Zealand; Cambridge	3	Kaio Lart	3	Mya Anderson
4–10 March 2024	Brazil; Curitiba	1	João Vitor da Silva	1	Carolina Barbosa
4–10 March 2024	Brazil; Curitiba	2	Flávio Cipriano	2	Maria Tereza Müller
4–10 March 2024	Brazil; Curitiba	3	Leandro de Larmelina	3	Tatielle Valadares
6–8 March 2024	Israel; Tel Aviv	1	Mikhail Iakovlev	1	Noa Shweky
6–8 March 2024	Israel; Tel Aviv	2	Vladislav Logionov	2	
6–8 March 2024	Israel; Tel Aviv	3	Frank Shaked	3	
21–25 March 2024	South Africa; Cape Town	1	Jean Spies	1	
21–25 March 2024	South Africa; Cape Town	2	Mitchell Sparrow	2	
21–25 March 2024	South Africa; Cape Town	3	James Swart	3	
25–29 March 2024	Uzbekistan; Tashkent	1	Ubaydulloh Abduraxmonov	1	Samira Bikmaeva
25–29 March 2024	Uzbekistan; Tashkent	2	Vladislav Jarkov	2	Valeriya Gamm
25–29 March 2024	Uzbekistan; Tashkent	3	Samandar Janikulov	3	Alina Bakcheeva
16–19 May 2024	Trinidad and Tobago; Couva	1	Zion Pulido	1	Phoebe Sandy
16–19 May 2024	Trinidad and Tobago; Couva	2	Ryan D’Abreau	2	Alexia Wilson
16–19 May 2024	Trinidad and Tobago; Couva	3	Devante Laurence	3	Adrianna Seyjagat
20–24 May 2024	Malaysia; Nilai	1	Azizulhasni Awang	1	Nurul Izzah Izzati Mohd Asri
20–24 May 2024	Malaysia; Nilai	2	Muhammad Ridwan Sahrom	2	Anis Amira Rosidi
20–24 May 2024	Malaysia; Nilai	3	Shah Firdaus Sahrom	3	Ann Tung Yong
24 May 2024	Barbados; Breinigsville (United States)	1		1	Amber Joseph
24 May 2024	Barbados; Breinigsville (United States)	2		2	
24 May 2024	Barbados; Breinigsville (United States)	3		3	
28–30 June 2024	Czech Republic; Prague	1	Matěj Bohuslávek	1	Veronika Jaborníková
28–30 June 2024	Czech Republic; Prague	2	Dominik Topinka	2	Anna Jaborníková
28–30 June 2024	Czech Republic; Prague	3	Jakub Malášek	3	Sára Peterková
22–27 June 2024	South Korea; Yangyang County	1	Kim Dong-hyun	1	Lee Hye-jin
22–27 June 2024	South Korea; Yangyang County	2	Kim Cheng-su	2	Cho Sun-young
22–27 June 2024	South Korea; Yangyang County	3	Oh Je-seok	3	Hwang Hyeon-seo
3–7 July 2024	Kazakhstan; Astana	1	Sergey Ponomarev	1	Polina Bratchikova
3–7 July 2024	Kazakhstan; Astana	2	Andrey Chugay	2	Gulnaz Khurmetbekkyzy
3–7 July 2024	Kazakhstan; Astana	3	Dmitriy Rezanov	3	Anna Pethukova
4–7 July 2024	Chinese Taipei; Taichung	1	Kang Shih-feng	1	Chen Ching-yun
4–7 July 2024	Chinese Taipei; Taichung	2	Tsai Chia-hsun	2	Wang Sin-ting
4–7 July 2024	Chinese Taipei; Taichung	3	Lee Ding-yeh	3	Qiu Jing-wen
6–7 July 2024	Switzerland; Oerlikon	1	Mats Poot	1	
6–7 July 2024	Switzerland; Oerlikon	2	Damien Fortis	2	
6–7 July 2024	Switzerland; Oerlikon	3	Nicolò De Lisi	3	
10–14 July 2024	United States; Carson, California	1	Evan Boone	1	McKenna McKee
10–14 July 2024	United States; Carson, California	2	Dalton Walters	2	Emily Hayes
10–14 July 2024	United States; Carson, California	3	Finn Koller	3	Kayla Hankins
12–14 July 2024	Thailand; Bangkok	1	Norasetthada Bunma	1	Aphitsara Srimongkhon
12–14 July 2024	Thailand; Bangkok	2	Muncheth Faimuenvai	2	Kanyarat Hnokaew
12–14 July 2024	Thailand; Bangkok	3	Nonthasak Raksasri	3	Natthaporn Aphimot
1–4 August 2024	Greece; Athens	1	Konstantinos Livanos	1	Despoina Tourli
1–4 August 2024	Greece; Athens	2	Ioannis Kalogeropoulos	2	Vasiliki Kokkali
1–4 August 2024	Greece; Athens	3	Miltiadis Charovas	3	Chrysoula Zacharioudaki

=== Points Race ===
Date	Venue	Podium (Men)		Podium (Women)	
4–7 January 2024	France; Saint-Quentin-en-Yvelines	1	Oscar Nilsson-Julien	1	Constance Marchand
4–7 January 2024	France; Saint-Quentin-en-Yvelines	2	Grégory Pouvreault	2	Léane Tabu
4–7 January 2024	France; Saint-Quentin-en-Yvelines	3	Louis Pijourlet	3	Clémence Chereau
5–7 January 2024	Canada; Milton	1	Dylan Bibic	1	Diane Snobelen
5–7 January 2024	Canada; Milton	2	Cameron Fitzmaurice	2	Lily Plante
5–7 January 2024	Canada; Milton	3	Gavin Hadfield	3	Jenna Nestman
20–21 January 2024	Portugal; Anadia	1	Iúri Leitão	1	Maria Martins
20–21 January 2024	Portugal; Anadia	2	Ivo Oliveira	2	Beatriz Roxo
20–21 January 2024	Portugal; Anadia	3	Daniel Dias	3	Patricia Duarte
25–26 January 2024	Switzerland; Grenchen	1	Simon Vitzthum	1	Michelle Andres
25–26 January 2024	Switzerland; Grenchen	2	Valère Thiébaud	2	Cybèle Schneider
25–26 January 2024	Switzerland; Grenchen	3	Lukas Rüegg	3	Aline Seitz
3 February 2024	Slovenia; Novo Mesto	1	Žak Eržen	1	Neža Zupanič
3 February 2024	Slovenia; Novo Mesto	2	Tilen Finkšt	2	Maja Perpar
3 February 2024	Slovenia; Novo Mesto	3	Nejc Peterlin	3	
23–25 February 2024	United Kingdom; Manchester	1	William Perrett	1	Jenny Holl
23–25 February 2024	United Kingdom; Manchester	2	William Roberts	2	Kate Richardson
23–25 February 2024	United Kingdom; Manchester	3	Noah Hobbs	3	Frankie Hall
23–25 February 2024	Spain; Galapagar	1	Jaime Romero	1	Ainara Albert
23–25 February 2024	Spain; Galapagar	2	Erik Martorell	2	Eukene Larrarte
23–25 February 2024	Spain; Galapagar	3	Noel Martín	3	Laura Rodríguez
1–3 March 2024	Bolivia; Santa Cruz de la Sierra	1		1	
1–3 March 2024	Bolivia; Santa Cruz de la Sierra	2		2	
1–3 March 2024	Bolivia; Santa Cruz de la Sierra	3		3	
1–5 March 2024	Australia; Brisbane	1	Conor Leahy	1	Chloe Moran
1–5 March 2024	Australia; Brisbane	2	James Moriarty	2	Keira Will
1–5 March 2024	Australia; Brisbane	3	Josh Duffy	3	Claudia Marcks
1–5 March 2024	New Zealand; Cambridge	1	Edward Pawson	1	Rylee McMullen
1–5 March 2024	New Zealand; Cambridge	2	Kyle Aitken	2	Hannah Bayard
1–5 March 2024	New Zealand; Cambridge	3	Oliver Watson-Palmer	3	Georgia Simpson
6–8 March 2024	Israel; Tel Aviv	1	Guy Timor	1	Noa Shweky
6–8 March 2024	Israel; Tel Aviv	2	Amit Keinan	2	Maayan Tzur
6–8 March 2024	Israel; Tel Aviv	3	Vladislav Logionov	3	Romi Veldnizki
21–25 March 2024	South Africa; Cape Town	1	Joshua Dike	1	Ainsli de Beer
21–25 March 2024	South Africa; Cape Town	2	Carl Bonthuys	2	Danielle van Niekerk
21–25 March 2024	South Africa; Cape Town	3	Bradley Gouveris	3	Anya du Plessis
25–29 March 2024	Uzbekistan; Tashkent	1	Danil Evdokimov	1	Ekaterina Knebeleva
25–29 March 2024	Uzbekistan; Tashkent	2	Alimardon Jamoldinov	2	Kseniya Li
25–29 March 2024	Uzbekistan; Tashkent	3	Vladislav Troman	3	Samira Ismailova
30–31 March 2024	United Arab Emirates; Sharjah	1	Khaled Mayouf	1	
30–31 March 2024	United Arab Emirates; Sharjah	2	Ahmed Al Mansoori	2	
30–31 March 2024	United Arab Emirates; Sharjah	3	Saif Mayoof Al Kaabi	3	
16–19 May 2024	Trinidad and Tobago; Couva	1	Akil Campbell	1	
16–19 May 2024	Trinidad and Tobago; Couva	2	Tariq Woods	2	
16–19 May 2024	Trinidad and Tobago; Couva	3	Liam Trepte	3	
20–24 May 2024	Malaysia; Nilai	1	Yusri Shaari	1	Nur Aisyah Mohamad Zubir
20–24 May 2024	Malaysia; Nilai	2	Muhammad Hafiq Mohd Jafri	2	Zhen Yi Yeong
20–24 May 2024	Malaysia; Nilai	3	Muhammad Adam Hakimi Nazuan	3	Ci Hui Nyo
24 May 2024 (women); 30 May – 2 June 2024 (men)	Barbados; Breinigsville (United States)	1		1	
24 May 2024 (women); 30 May – 2 June 2024 (men)	Barbados; Breinigsville (United States)	2		2	
24 May 2024 (women); 30 May – 2 June 2024 (men)	Barbados; Breinigsville (United States)	3		3	
24 June 2024	Denmark; Aarhus	1	Matias Malmberg	1	Julie Norman Leth
24 June 2024	Denmark; Aarhus	2	Rasmus Bøgh Wallin	2	Ellen Hjøllund Klinge
24 June 2024	Denmark; Aarhus	3	Ruben Zilas Larsen	3	Ida Dam Fialla
3–7 July 2024	Kazakhstan; Astana	1	Alisher Zhumakan	1	Rinata Sultanova
3–7 July 2024	Kazakhstan; Astana	2	Ramis Dinmukhametov	2	Makhabbat Umutzhanova
3–7 July 2024	Kazakhstan; Astana	3	Dmitriy Noskov	3	Svetlana Pachshenko
10–14 July 2024	United States; Carson, California	1	Anders Johnson	1	Kimberly Ann Zubris
10–14 July 2024	United States; Carson, California	2	Lance Abshire	2	Chloe Patrick
10–14 July 2024	United States; Carson, California	3	Bradley Green	3	Elizabeth Stevenson
12–14 July 2024	Thailand; Bangkok	1	Patompob Phonarjthan	1	
12–14 July 2024	Thailand; Bangkok	2	Thak Kaeonoi	2	
12–14 July 2024	Thailand; Bangkok	3	Tanawat Saenta	3	
1–4 August 2024	Greece; Athens	1	Zisis Soulios	1	Argyro Milaki
1–4 August 2024	Greece; Athens	2	Dionysios Douzas	2	Eirini Papadimitriou Stampori
1–4 August 2024	Greece; Athens	3	Nikolaos Michail Drakos	3	Vasiliki Kokkali

=== Time Trial ===
Date	Venue	Podium (Men)		Podium (Women)	
4–7 January 2024	France; Saint-Quentin-en-Yvelines	1	Tom Derache	1	Taky Marie-Divine Kouamé
4–7 January 2024	France; Saint-Quentin-en-Yvelines	2	Quentin Caleyron	2	Julie Michaux
4–7 January 2024	France; Saint-Quentin-en-Yvelines	3	Luca Priore	3	Marie-Louisa Drouode
5–7 January 2024	Canada; Milton	1	James Hedgcock	1	Erin Watchman
5–7 January 2024	Canada; Milton	2	Mathias Guillemette	2	Anne-Marie Dumont
5–7 January 2024	Canada; Milton	3	Dylan Bibic	3	Thalia Krauth-Ibarz
13–14 January 2024	Denmark; Ballerup	1	Oskar Ulrik Winkler	1	
13–14 January 2024	Denmark; Ballerup	2	Peter Jørgensen	2	
13–14 January 2024	Denmark; Ballerup	3	Alberto Christian Gormsen	3	
3 February 2024	Slovenia; Novo Mesto	1	Natan Gregorčič	1	Neža Zupanič
3 February 2024	Slovenia; Novo Mesto	2	Eduard Žalar	2	Maja Perpar
3 February 2024	Slovenia; Novo Mesto	3	Mark Poberaj	3	
23 February 2024	United Kingdom; Manchester	1	Aaron Pope	1	Rhianna Parris-Smith
23 February 2024	United Kingdom; Manchester	2	Niall Monks	2	Lowri Thomas
23 February 2024	United Kingdom; Manchester	3	Henry Hobbs	3	Milly Tanner
23–25 February 2024	Spain; Galapagar	1	Ekain Jiménez	1	Helena Casas
23–25 February 2024	Spain; Galapagar	2	José Moreno Sánchez	2	Isabel Ferreres
23–25 February 2024	Spain; Galapagar	3	Esteban Sánchez Garmendia	3	Saioa Orgambide
1–3 March 2024	Bolivia; Santa Cruz de la Sierra	1		1	
1–3 March 2024	Bolivia; Santa Cruz de la Sierra	2		2	
1–3 March 2024	Bolivia; Santa Cruz de la Sierra	3		3	
1–5 March 2024	Australia; Brisbane	1	Byron Davies	1	Alessia McCaig
1–5 March 2024	Australia; Brisbane	2	Josh Duffy	2	Kristine Perkins
1–5 March 2024	Australia; Brisbane	3	Sam Gallagher	3	Tomasin Clark
1–5 March 2024	New Zealand; Cambridge	1	Nick Kergozou	1	Shaane Fulton
1–5 March 2024	New Zealand; Cambridge	2	Kyle Aitken	2	Sophie de Vries
1–5 March 2024	New Zealand; Cambridge	3	Liam Cavanagh	3	Leila Walker
21–25 March 2024	South Africa; Cape Town	1	Wikus Johannes Myburgh	1	
21–25 March 2024	South Africa; Cape Town	2	Ethan Kulsen	2	
21–25 March 2024	South Africa; Cape Town	3	Michael Jervis	3	
25–29 March 2024	Uzbekistan; Tashkent	1	Timur Abdukhakimov	1	Alina Bakcheeva
25–29 March 2024	Uzbekistan; Tashkent	2	Behzod Bahodirov	2	Nozima Egamberdieva
25–29 March 2024	Uzbekistan; Tashkent	3	Vladislav Jarkov	3	Polina Ojereleva
16–19 May 2024	Trinidad and Tobago; Couva	1	Samuel Moloney	1	
16–19 May 2024	Trinidad and Tobago; Couva	2	Devante Laurence	2	
16–19 May 2024	Trinidad and Tobago; Couva	3	Raul Luis Garcia	3	
20–24 May 2024	Malaysia; Nilai	1	Muhammad Ridwan Sahrom	1	Nurul Izzah Izzati Mohd Asri
20–24 May 2024	Malaysia; Nilai	2	Muhammad Hafiq Mohd Jafri	2	Ann Tung Yong
20–24 May 2024	Malaysia; Nilai	3	Ahmad Safwan Ahmad Nazeri	3	Nurul Aliana Syafika Azizan
28–30 June 2024	Czech Republic; Prague	1	Dominik Topinka	1	Veronika Jaborníková
28–30 June 2024	Czech Republic; Prague	2	Jakub Malášek	2	Anna Jaborníková
28–30 June 2024	Czech Republic; Prague	3	Matěj Bohuslávek	3	Sára Peterková
3–7 July 2024	Kazakhstan; Astana	1	Kirill Kurdidi	1	Polina Bratchikova
3–7 July 2024	Kazakhstan; Astana	2	Ramazan Mukhtar	2	Anastassiya Ponomaryova
3–7 July 2024	Kazakhstan; Astana	3	Viktor Golov	3	Alina Yunkman
10–14 July 2024	United States; Carson, California	1	Wyatt Paul	1	Emily Hayes
10–14 July 2024	United States; Carson, California	2	David Domonoske	2	Keely Ainslie
10–14 July 2024	United States; Carson, California	3	Corey Jameson	3	McKenna McKee
12–14 July 2024	Thailand; Bangkok	1	Norasetthada Bunma	1	Aphitsara Simongkhon
12–14 July 2024	Thailand; Bangkok	2	Nonthasak Raksasri	2	Kanyarat Hnokaew
12–14 July 2024	Thailand; Bangkok	3	Muncheth Faimuenvai	3	Yaowaret Jitmat
20–21 July 2024	Georgia; Tbilisi	1	Valeri Mamulashvili	1	
20–21 July 2024	Georgia; Tbilisi	2	Avtandil Piranishvili	2	
20–21 July 2024	Georgia; Tbilisi	3	Giorgi Khorguani	3	
1–4 August 2024	Greece; Athens	1	Miltiadis Charovas	1	Despoina Tourli
1–4 August 2024	Greece; Athens	2	Konstantinos Nteros	2	Vasiliki Fragkioudaki
1–4 August 2024	Greece; Athens	3	Iraklis Balafas	3	Varvara Vasoi

=== Elimination Race ===
Date	Venue	Podium (Men)		Podium (Women)	
5–7 January 2024	Canada; Milton	1	Dylan Bibic	1	Jenna Nestman
5–7 January 2024	Canada; Milton	2	Cameron Fitzmaurice	2	Kiara Lylyk
5–7 January 2024	Canada; Milton	3	Michael Foley	3	Diane Snobelen
20–21 January 2024	Portugal; Anadia	1	Iúri Leitão	1	Maria Martins
20–21 January 2024	Portugal; Anadia	2	Ivo Oliveira	2	Beatriz Roxo
20–21 January 2024	Portugal; Anadia	3	Diogo Narciso	3	Patrícia Duarte
25–26 January 2024	Switzerland; Grenchen	1	Simon Vitzthum	1	Aline Seitz
25–26 January 2024	Switzerland; Grenchen	2	Alex Vogel	2	Michelle Andres
25–26 January 2024	Switzerland; Grenchen	3	Nicolò De Lisi	3	Lorena Leu
3 February 2024	Slovenia; Novo Mesto	1	Nejc Peterlin	1	Neža Zupanič
3 February 2024	Slovenia; Novo Mesto	2	Natan Gregorčič	2	Maja Perpar
3 February 2024	Slovenia; Novo Mesto	3	Žak Eržen	3	
23–25 February 2024	Spain; Galapagar	1	Erik Martorell	1	Eva Anguela
23–25 February 2024	Spain; Galapagar	2	José Segura	2	Eukene Larrarte
23–25 February 2024	Spain; Galapagar	3	Joan Martí Bennassar	3	Ziortza Isasi
1–3 March 2024	Bolivia; Santa Cruz de la Sierra	1		1	
1–3 March 2024	Bolivia; Santa Cruz de la Sierra	2		2	
1–3 March 2024	Bolivia; Santa Cruz de la Sierra	3		3	
1–5 March 2024	Australia; Brisbane	1	Kurt Eather	1	Claudia Marcks
1–5 March 2024	Australia; Brisbane	2	Graeme Frislie	2	Isla Carr
1–5 March 2024	Australia; Brisbane	3	John Carter	3	Belinda Bailey
1–5 March 2024	New Zealand; Cambridge	1	Bailey O'Donnell	1	Bryony Botha
1–5 March 2024	New Zealand; Cambridge	2	Hayden Strong	2	Prudence Fowler
1–5 March 2024	New Zealand; Cambridge	3	Nick Kergozou	3	Georgia Simpson
6–8 March 2024	Israel; Tel Aviv	1	Guy Timor	1	Ori Bash Dubinski
6–8 March 2024	Israel; Tel Aviv	2	Amit Keinan	2	Noa Shweky
6–8 March 2024	Israel; Tel Aviv	3	Oron Argov	3	Maayan Tzur
21–25 March 2024	South Africa; Cape Town	1	Joshua Dike	1	Ainsli de Beer
21–25 March 2024	South Africa; Cape Town	2	Wynand Hofmeyr	2	Danielle van Niekerk
21–25 March 2024	South Africa; Cape Town	3	Dániyal Matthews	3	Anya du Plessis
25–29 March 2024	Uzbekistan; Tashkent	1	Danil Evdokimov	1	Madina Kakhorova
25–29 March 2024	Uzbekistan; Tashkent	2	Daniil Fedorov	2	Kseniya Li
25–29 March 2024	Uzbekistan; Tashkent	3	Vladislav Troman	3	Sofiya Karimova
30–31 March 2024	United Arab Emirates; Sharjah	1	Ahmed Al Mansoori	1	
30–31 March 2024	United Arab Emirates; Sharjah	2	Khaled Mayouf	2	
30–31 March 2024	United Arab Emirates; Sharjah	3	Hamdan Hassan	3	
20–21 April 2024	El Salvador; San Salvador	1	Wilber Martínez	1	
20–21 April 2024	El Salvador; San Salvador	2	Xavier Escamilla	2	
20–21 April 2024	El Salvador; San Salvador	3	Luciano Venanzi	3	
16–19 May 2024	Trinidad and Tobago; Couva	1	Akil Campbell	1	
16–19 May 2024	Trinidad and Tobago; Couva	2	Tariq Woods	2	
16–19 May 2024	Trinidad and Tobago; Couva	3	Liam Trepte	3	
20–24 May 2024	Malaysia; Nilai	1	Harrif Saleh	1	Nur Aisyah Mohamad Zubir
20–24 May 2024	Malaysia; Nilai	2	New Joe Lau	2	Nur Fitrah Shaari
20–24 May 2024	Malaysia; Nilai	3	Zulhelmi Zainal	3	Zhen Yi Yeong
24 May 2024 (women); 30 May – 2 June 2024 (men)	Barbados; Breinigsville (United States)	1		1	Amber Joseph
24 May 2024 (women); 30 May – 2 June 2024 (men)	Barbados; Breinigsville (United States)	2		2	
24 May 2024 (women); 30 May – 2 June 2024 (men)	Barbados; Breinigsville (United States)	3		3	
24 June 2024	Denmark; Aarhus	1	Matias Malmberg	1	Ellen Hjøllund Klinge
24 June 2024	Denmark; Aarhus	2	Rasmus Bøgh Wallin	2	Julie Norman Leth
24 June 2024	Denmark; Aarhus	3	Nils Lau Nyborg Broge	3	Ida Dam Fialla
3–7 July 2024	Kazakhstan; Astana	1	Ramis Dinmukhametov	1	Anzhela Solovyeva
3–7 July 2024	Kazakhstan; Astana	2	Ilya Karabutov	2	Rinata Sultanova
3–7 July 2024	Kazakhstan; Astana	3	Sergey Karmazhakov	3	Polina Bratchikova
10–14 July 2024	United States; Carson, California	1	John Bowie	1	Kimberly Ann Zubris
10–14 July 2024	United States; Carson, California	2	Lance Abshire	2	Colleen Gulick
10–14 July 2024	United States; Carson, California	3	Michael Watkins	3	Chloe Patrick
12–14 July 2024	Thailand; Bangkok	1	Setthawut Yordsuwan	1	Natthaporn Aphimot
12–14 July 2024	Thailand; Bangkok	2	Patompob Phonarjthan	2	Kanyarat Hnokaew
12–14 July 2024	Thailand; Bangkok	3	Tanawat Saenta	3	Aphitsara Simongkhon
1–4 August 2024	Greece; Athens	1	Zisis Soulios	1	Argyro Milaki
1–4 August 2024	Greece; Athens	2	Nikolaos Michail Drakos	2	Eirini Papadimitriou Stampori
1–4 August 2024	Greece; Athens	3	Georgios Boutopoulos	3	Eirini Maria Karousou

=== Omnium ===
Date	Venue	Podium (Men)		Podium (Women)	
4–7 January 2024	France; Saint-Quentin-en-Yvelines	1	Valentin Tabellion	1	Clara Copponi
4–7 January 2024	France; Saint-Quentin-en-Yvelines	2	Oscar Nilsson-Julien	2	Valentine Fortin
4–7 January 2024	France; Saint-Quentin-en-Yvelines	3	Benjamin Thomas	3	Victoire Berteau
5–7 January 2024	Canada; Milton	1	Dylan Bibic	1	Ngaire Barraclough
5–7 January 2024	Canada; Milton	2	Zach Webster	2	Lily Plante
5–7 January 2024	Canada; Milton	3	Chris Ernst	3	Jenna Nestman
20–21 January 2024	Portugal; Anadia	1	Iúri Leitão	1	Maria Martins
20–21 January 2024	Portugal; Anadia	2	Ivo Oliveira	2	Beatriz Roxo
20–21 January 2024	Portugal; Anadia	3	João Matias	3	Patricia Duarte
25–26 January 2024	Switzerland; Grenchen	1	Simon Vitzthum	1	Michelle Andres
25–26 January 2024	Switzerland; Grenchen	2	Alex Vogel	2	Aline Seitz
25–26 January 2024	Switzerland; Grenchen	3	Valère Thiébaud	3	Jasmin Liechti
3 February 2024	Slovenia; Novo Mesto	1	Žak Eržen	1	Neža Zupanič
3 February 2024	Slovenia; Novo Mesto	2	Tilen Finkšt	2	Maja Perpar
3 February 2024	Slovenia; Novo Mesto	3	Nejc Peterlin	3	
10 February 2024	Spain; Dos Hermanas	1	Francesc Bennassar	1	Eukene Larrarte
10 February 2024	Spain; Dos Hermanas	2	Mario Anguela	2	Marga López
10 February 2024	Spain; Dos Hermanas	3	Álvaro Navas	3	Laura Rodríguez
1–5 March 2024	New Zealand; Cambridge	1	Marshall Erwood	1	Bryony Botha
1–5 March 2024	New Zealand; Cambridge	2	Nick Kergozou	2	Emily Shearman
1–5 March 2024	New Zealand; Cambridge	3	Hayden Strong	3	Sami Donnelly
4–10 March 2024	Brazil; Curitiba	1	Otavio Gonzeli	1	Talita Oliveira
4–10 March 2024	Brazil; Curitiba	2	Samuel Stachera	2	Gabriela Da Costa
4–10 March 2024	Brazil; Curitiba	3	Pedro Miguel Freitas	3	Larissa Castelari
6–8 March 2024	Israel; Tel Aviv	1	Guy Timor	1	Noa Shweky
6–8 March 2024	Israel; Tel Aviv	2	Amit Keinan	2	Maayan Tzur
6–8 March 2024	Israel; Tel Aviv	3	Vladislav Logionov	3	Romi Veldnizki
25–29 March 2024	Uzbekistan; Tashkent	1	Vladislav Troman	1	Madina Kakhkhorova
25–29 March 2024	Uzbekistan; Tashkent	2	Daniil Fedorov	2	Samira Ismailova
25–29 March 2024	Uzbekistan; Tashkent	3	Danil Evdokimov	3	Kseniya Li
30–31 March 2024	United Arab Emirates; Sharjah	1	Khaled Mayouf	1	
30–31 March 2024	United Arab Emirates; Sharjah	2	Ahmed Al Mansoori	2	
30–31 March 2024	United Arab Emirates; Sharjah	3	Saif Mayoof Al Kaabi	3	
3–8 April 2024	Kazakhstan; Astana	1	Ramis Dinmukhametov	1	Rinata Sultanova
3–8 April 2024	Kazakhstan; Astana	2	Maxim Khoroshavin	2	Makhabbat Umutzhanova
3–8 April 2024	Kazakhstan; Astana	3	Alisher Zhumakan	3	Anzhela Solovyeva
16–19 May 2024	Trinidad and Tobago; Couva	1	Akil Campbell	1	
16–19 May 2024	Trinidad and Tobago; Couva	2	Liam Trepte	2	
16–19 May 2024	Trinidad and Tobago; Couva	3	Maurice Burnette	3	
24 May 2024 (women); 30 May – 2 June 2024 (men)	Barbados; Breinigsville (United States)	1	Edwin Sutherland	1	Amber Joseph
24 May 2024 (women); 30 May – 2 June 2024 (men)	Barbados; Breinigsville (United States)	2	Dominic Howard	2	
24 May 2024 (women); 30 May – 2 June 2024 (men)	Barbados; Breinigsville (United States)	3		3	
22–27 June 2024	South Korea; Yangyang County	1	Jang Kyung-gu	1	Jieun Shin
22–27 June 2024	South Korea; Yangyang County	2	Kim Hyeon-seok	2	Song Min-ji
22–27 June 2024	South Korea; Yangyang County	3	Hun Jang	3	Park Do-young
4–7 July 2024	Chinese Taipei; Taichung	1	Liu En-chieh	1	Huang Ting-ying
4–7 July 2024	Chinese Taipei; Taichung	2	Chang Chih-sheng	2	Lai Chia-chi
4–7 July 2024	Chinese Taipei; Taichung	3	Lee Dong-ling	3	Wang Shih-chiao
6 July 2024	Ireland; Dublin	1	Conn McDunphy	1	Aoife O'Brien
6 July 2024	Ireland; Dublin	2	Cian Keogh	2	Jennifer Neenan
6 July 2024	Ireland; Dublin	3	Stefan Caulfield-Dreier	3	Jennifer Bates
10–14 July 2024	United States; Carson, California	1	Brendan Rhim	1	Kimberly Ann Zubris
10–14 July 2024	United States; Carson, California	2	Anders Johnson	2	Chloe Patrick
10–14 July 2024	United States; Carson, California	3	Colby Lange	3	Colleen Gulick
12–14 July 2024	Thailand; Bangkok	1	Thanakom Jumprabhut	1	
12–14 July 2024	Thailand; Bangkok	2	Ponlawat Sakunthanaphum	2	
12–14 July 2024	Thailand; Bangkok	3	Thak Kaeonoi	3	
1–4 August 2024	Greece; Athens	1	Zisis Soulios	1	Argyro Milaki
1–4 August 2024	Greece; Athens	2	Nikolaos Michail Drakos	2	Vasiliki Kokkali
1–4 August 2024	Greece; Athens	3	Nikolaos Manthos	3	Eirini Papadimitriou Stampori

=== Madison ===
Date	Venue	Podium (Men)		Podium (Women)	
4–7 January 2024	France; Saint-Quentin-en-Yvelines	1	Thomas Boudat; Valentin Tabellion	1	Victoire Berteau; Valentine Fortin
4–7 January 2024	France; Saint-Quentin-en-Yvelines	2	Donavan Grondin; Quentin Lafargue	2	Marion Borras; Violette Demay
4–7 January 2024	France; Saint-Quentin-en-Yvelines	3	Erwan Besnier; Florian Maître	3	Clara Copponi; Lara Lallemant
5–7 January 2024	Canada; Milton	1	Mathias Guillemette; Dylan Bibic	1	Ngaire Barraclough; Kiara Lylyk
5–7 January 2024	Canada; Milton	2	Michael Foley; Chris Ernst	2	Lily Plante; Maxim Lapointe
5–7 January 2024	Canada; Milton	3	Sam Morris; Cameron Fitzmaurice	3	Justine Thomas; Jenna Nestman
20–21 January 2024	Portugal; Anadia	1	Iúri Leitão; Diogo Narciso	1	
20–21 January 2024	Portugal; Anadia	2	Carlos Salgueiro; Rodrigo Caixas	2	
20–21 January 2024	Portugal; Anadia	3	João Matias; Ivo Oliveira	3	
3 February 2024	Slovenia; Novo Mesto	1	Žak Eržen; Nejc Peterlin	1	
3 February 2024	Slovenia; Novo Mesto	2	Anže Skok; Tilen Finkšt	2	
3 February 2024	Slovenia; Novo Mesto	3	Jaka Špoljar; Vid Murn	3	
11 February 2024	Spain; Dos Hermanas	1	Francesc Bennassar; Joan Martí Bennassar	1	Ainara Albert; Isabel Ferreres
11 February 2024	Spain; Dos Hermanas	2	Mario Anguela; Álvaro Navas	2	Marga López; Marina Garau
11 February 2024	Spain; Dos Hermanas	3	Jaime Romero; Urko Vidal	3	Isabella Escalera; Eva Anguela
1–5 March 2024	New Zealand; Cambridge	1	Bailey O'Donnell; Marshall Erwood	1	Emily Shearman; Bryony Botha
1–5 March 2024	New Zealand; Cambridge	2	Magnus Jamieson; Kane Foster	2	Georgia Simpson; Prudence Fowler
1–5 March 2024	New Zealand; Cambridge	3	Matthew Davis; Maui Morrison	3	Meg Baker; Elena Worrall
6–8 March 2024	Israel; Tel Aviv	1	Vladislav Logionov; Alon Yogev	1	
6–8 March 2024	Israel; Tel Aviv	2	Ilay Argov; Saar Idan	2	
6–8 March 2024	Israel; Tel Aviv	3	Amit Keinan; Oron Argov	3	
21–25 March 2024	South Africa; Cape Town	1	Joshua Dike; Matthew Lester	1	
21–25 March 2024	South Africa; Cape Town	2	Wynand Hofmeyr; Carl Bonthuys	2	
21–25 March 2024	South Africa; Cape Town	3	Bradley Gouveris; Kellan Alex Gouveris	3	
25–29 March 2024	Uzbekistan; Tashkent	1	Danil Evdokimov; Vladislav Troman	1	Evgeniya Golotina; Kseniya Li
25–29 March 2024	Uzbekistan; Tashkent	2	Daniil Fedorov; Abdulkhamid Tuychiev	2	Madina Kakhkhorova; Asal Rizaeva
25–29 March 2024	Uzbekistan; Tashkent	3	Vitaliy Burlakov; Nursultan Tursunov	3	Valeriya Gamm; Muhlisa Ashurova
15 June 2024	United Kingdom; London	1	Tom Ward; Frank Longstaff	1	
15 June 2024	United Kingdom; London	2	Alec Briggs; Joe Holt	2	
15 June 2024	United Kingdom; London	3	James Ambrose-Parish; William Gilbank	3	
22–27 June 2024	South Korea; Yangyang County	1	Joo Somang; Park Sang-hoon	1	Jieun Shin; Yunseo No
22–27 June 2024	South Korea; Yangyang County	2	Kim Eu-ro; Kim Sun-jae	2	Kang Hyun-kyung; Kim Ok-hui
22–27 June 2024	South Korea; Yangyang County	3	Hong Seung-min; Hun Jang	3	Park Su-bin; Lee ha-ran
3–7 July 2024	Kazakhstan; Astana	1	Sergey Karmazhakov; Ramis Dinmukhametov	1	Faina Potapova; Svetlana Pachshenko
3–7 July 2024	Kazakhstan; Astana	2	Aslan Silykbek; Assylkhan Turar	2	Bota Batyrbekova; Dariya Kazakbay
3–7 July 2024	Kazakhstan; Astana	3	Dmitriy Noskov; Sultanmurat Miraliyev	3	Karina Abdrakhmanova; Dinara Kopzhassarova
4–7 July 2024	Chinese Taipei; Taichung	1	Chan Chih-sheng; Xu Shi-ru	1	Lai Chia-chi; Lin Jhih-yan
4–7 July 2024	Chinese Taipei; Taichung	2	Lin Hsuan-lun; Huang Shao-fu	2	Chen Ching-yun; Wang Sin-ting
4–7 July 2024	Chinese Taipei; Taichung	3	Liao Sheng-yi; Chen Tse-an	3	Wang Shih-chiao; Gao Yu-xuan
1–4 August 2024	Greece; Athens	1	Nikiforos Arvanitou; Nikolaos Michail Drakos	1	
1–4 August 2024	Greece; Athens	2	Kyriakos Papastamatakis; Michail Savvakis	2	
1–4 August 2024	Greece; Athens	3	Konstantinos Berdempes; Alexandros Karousos	3	

=== Team Sprint ===
Date	Venue	Podium (Men)		Podium (Women)	
5–7 January 2024	Canada; Milton	1	Patrice Pivin; Tyler Davies; Ryan-Shaun Macdonald	1	Jackie Boyle; Erica Rieder; Anne-Marie Dumont
5–7 January 2024	Canada; Milton	2	Ryan Dodyk; Tyler Rorke; Cole Dempster	2	Thalia Krauth-Ibarz; Emy Savard; Erin Watchman
5–7 January 2024	Canada; Milton	3	Theron Inglis; Andrew Scott; Hudson Lubbers	3	
3 February 2024	Slovenia; Novo Mesto	1	Anže Skok; Tilen Finkšt; Nejc Peterlin	1	
3 February 2024	Slovenia; Novo Mesto	2	Luka Ziherl; Marcel Gladek; Mihael Štajnar	2	
3 February 2024	Slovenia; Novo Mesto	3	Dan Andrej Tomšič; Domen Oblak; Natan Gregorčič	3	
23–25 February 2024	United Kingdom; Manchester	1	Ed Lowe; Hayden Norris; Harry Ledingham-Horn	1	Georgette Rand; Milly Tanner; Sophie Capewell
23–25 February 2024	United Kingdom; Manchester	2	Marcus Hiley; Harry Radford; Joseph Truman	2	Rhian Edmunds; Iona Moir; Rhianna Parris-Smith
23–25 February 2024	United Kingdom; Manchester	3	Oliver Aloul; Tom Morrissey; Matt Rotherham	3	Lucy Grant; Kirsty Johnson; Christina Smith
23–25 February 2024	Spain; Galapagar	1	Itmar Esteban Herraiz; Gerard García Gómez; Manel Usach	1	
23–25 February 2024	Spain; Galapagar	2	Rafael Martínez; Carlos Pérez Calzada; Esteban Sánchez; Alberto Santos Fernández	2	
23–25 February 2024	Spain; Galapagar	3	Guillem Guirao Piqué; Joan Jurado Rota; Saúl Martínez Talón	3	
1–3 March 2024	Bolivia; Santa Cruz de la Sierra	1		1	
1–3 March 2024	Bolivia; Santa Cruz de la Sierra	2		2	
1–3 March 2024	Bolivia; Santa Cruz de la Sierra	3		3	
1–5 March 2024	Australia; Brisbane	1	Maxwell Liebeknecht; Leigh Hoffman; Matthew Glaetzer	1	Selina Ho; Tomasin Clark; Kalinda Robinson
1–5 March 2024	Australia; Brisbane	2	John Trovas; Daniel Barber; Thomas Cornish	2	Emma Stevens; Sophie Watts; Jacqui Mengler-Mohr
1–5 March 2024	Australia; Brisbane	3	Brycen Fletcher; Ryan Elliott; Byron Davies	3	Jacqueline Nock; Kristine Perkins; Sally Carter
1–5 March 2024	New Zealand; Cambridge	1	Jaxson Russell; Patrick Clancy; Liam Cavanagh	1	Olivia King; Shaane Fulton; Rebecca Petch
1–5 March 2024	New Zealand; Cambridge	2	Jared Mann; Kaio Lart; Matthew Davis	2	Mya Anderson; Sophie de Vries; Leila Walker
1–5 March 2024	New Zealand; Cambridge	3		3	Sammie Walker; Hannah Bayard; Alana Breen
4–10 March 2024	Brazil; Curitiba	1	João Victor Silva; Daniel Gruer de Brito; Mauro Aquino	1	
4–10 March 2024	Brazil; Curitiba	2	Vinicius Gussolli; Fernando Sikora Jr. Igor Nova Mello Berlanda	2	
4–10 March 2024	Brazil; Curitiba	3	Leandro de Larmelina; Franklin Almeida; Matheus Fudisaki	3	
21–25 March 2024	South Africa; Cape Town	1	Douglas Abbot; Wikus Johannes Myburgh; Tshilalahufhe Marubini Munyai	1	
21–25 March 2024	South Africa; Cape Town	2	Jean Spies; Kellan Alex Gouveris; James Swart	2	
21–25 March 2024	South Africa; Cape Town	3	Mitchell Sparrow; Matthew Lester; Michael Jervis	3	
25–29 March 2024	Uzbekistan; Tashkent	1	Alimardon Jamoldinov; Rakhmatjon Bakhtiyorov; Behzodbek Nurmatov; Ismagil Sattorov	1	Evgeniya Golotina; Alina Bakcheeva; Anisa Tursunova; Anastasiya Safonova
25–29 March 2024	Uzbekistan; Tashkent	2	Edem Eminov; Danil Vostrikov; Vagit Arslanov; Timur Abdukhakimov	2	Angelina Korobkina; Nozima Egamberdiyeva; Madina Abdusattorova; Arina Makarkina
25–29 March 2024	Uzbekistan; Tashkent	3	Damir Zabirov; Kamoliddin Bakhriddinov; Djurabek Abdikodirov	3	Valeriya Gamm; Muhlisa Ashurova; Roksana Xikmatova
16–19 May 2024	Trinidad and Tobago; Couva	1	Kyle Caraby; Ryan D’Abreau; Devante Laurence	1	
16–19 May 2024	Trinidad and Tobago; Couva	2	Raul Luis Garcia; Troy Nelson; John Gyan-Sootim	2	
16–19 May 2024	Trinidad and Tobago; Couva	3		3	
20–24 May 2024	Malaysia; Nilai	1	Muhammad Ridwan Sahrom; Mohd Akmal Nazimi Jusena; Muhammad Nabil Wafiq Zamri	1	Nurul Izzah Izzati Mohd Asri; Nur Fitrah Shaari; Nurul Nabilah Mohd Asri
20–24 May 2024	Malaysia; Nilai	2	Yusri Shaari; Adiq Husainie Othman; Ahmad Safwan Ahmad Nazeri	2	Nur Umairah Qhaisara Zulfikha Razak; Intan Nur Irdrisha Abdul Razak; Nurul Aliana Syafika Azizan
20–24 May 2024	Malaysia; Nilai	3	Umar Hasbullah; Muhammad Amer Khuzainifahmi Mohd Farid; Darwish Putra Muhd Sanusi	3	
28–30 June 2024	Czech Republic; Prague	1	Jakub Malášek; Dominik Topinka; Matěj Bohuslávek	1	Michaela Poulová; Sára Peterková; Anna Jaborníková
28–30 June 2024	Czech Republic; Prague	2	Lukáš Hrbotický; Vojtěch Žaludek; Jiří Janošek	2	Elen Lazarová; Karolína Richterová; Veronika Jaborníková
28–30 June 2024	Czech Republic; Prague	3	Daniel Vajbar; Libor Pojeta; Pavel Jaborník	3	Sára Hrůzová; Magdalena Míčková; Dagmar Hejhalová
22–27 June 2024	South Korea; Yangyang County	1	Kang Dong-jin; Oh Je-seok; Choi Woo-rim; Ha Jun-hong; Park Sung-min	1	Lee Hye-jin; Jang Eun-seol; Kim Soo-hyun
22–27 June 2024	South Korea; Yangyang County	2	Kang Seo-jun; Shin Ji-young; Oh Min-jae; Choe Su-min	2	Hwang Hyeon-seo; Kim Su-vin; Kim Dok-yung
22–27 June 2024	South Korea; Yangyang County	3	Jeong Jae-hun; Junseo Moon-shin; Lee Geon-min; Maru Jung	3	Kim Chae-yeon; Kim Tae-nam; Cho Sun-young
3–7 July 2024	Kazakhstan; Astana	1	Sergey Ponomarev; Viktor Golov; Ramazan Mukhtar; Sultanmurat Miraliyev	1	Diana Kossolapova; Marina Kuzmina; Milana Kotelnikova
3–7 July 2024	Kazakhstan; Astana	2	Rizvan Beisenbayev; Kirill Kurdidi; Vladislav Bashlykov; Matvey Samsonov	2	Svetlana Pachshenko; Bota Batyrbekova; Faina Potapova
3–7 July 2024	Kazakhstan; Astana	3	Dmitriy Rezanov; Arkadiy Shemet; Roman Khakimov	3	Anna Petukhova; Alina Yunkman; Rinata Sultanova
4–7 July 2024	Chinese Taipei; Taichung	1	Chen Chien-liang; Tsai Chia-hsun; Huang Ching-lun; Yang Ding-hao	1	
4–7 July 2024	Chinese Taipei; Taichung	2	Lee Ding-yeh; Kang Shih-feng; Xu Shi-ru	2	
4–7 July 2024	Chinese Taipei; Taichung	3	Lin Hsuan-lun; Lui En-chieh; Huang Yong-jie	3	
10–14 July 2024	United States; Carson, California	1	Evan Boone; Joshua Hartman; Dalton Walters	1	Keely Ainslie; Kayla Hankins; Emily Hayes
10–14 July 2024	United States; Carson, California	2	Reid Myers; Zephin Mann; Sterling Reneau	2	Rita Fedewa; McKenna McKee; Missy Schwab
10–14 July 2024	United States; Carson, California	3	Corey Jameson; Alex Siegel; Elliott Davis	3	Mary Wintz; Sylese Christian; Hayley Yoslov
12–14 July 2024	Thailand; Bangkok	1	Norasetthada Bunma; Pongthep Tapimay; Worayut Kapunya; Yeaunyong Petcharat	1	
12–14 July 2024	Thailand; Bangkok	2	Muncheth Faimuenvai; Jaturong Niwanti; Wiriya Yapa; Wachirawit Saenkhamwong	2	
12–14 July 2024	Thailand; Bangkok	3	Orrachun Petcharat; Chiraphong Phaksriwong; Phuwadol Kotprom; Nuttakrit Chanpratad	3	
1–4 August 2024	Greece; Athens	1	Miltiadis Charovas; Michail Savvakis; Stamatios Savvakis	1	Eirini Ntaountaki; Vasiliki Fragkioudaki; Eleni Doxaki
1–4 August 2024	Greece; Athens	2	Konstantinos Livakos; Panagiotis Panagaris; Ioannis Xenakis; Emmanouil Goulermakis	2	
1–4 August 2024	Greece; Athens	3	Iraklis Balafas; Konstantinos Nteros; Gerasimos Spiliotopoulos; Nikolaos Voukelatos	3	

=== Team Pursuit ===
Date	Venue	Podium (Men)		Podium (Women)	
4–7 January 2024	France; Saint-Quentin-en-Yvelines	1	Corentin Ermenault; Adrien Garel; Louis Pijourlet; Clément Petit	1	Clara Copponi; Valentine Fortin; Marie Patouillet; Lara Lallemant
4–7 January 2024	France; Saint-Quentin-en-Yvelines	2	Maël Zahem; Thomas Boudat; Théo Bracke; Valentin Tabellion	2	Clémence Chéreau; Marie-Morgane Le Deunff; Ilona Rouat; Maylis Sarron
4–7 January 2024	France; Saint-Quentin-en-Yvelines	3	Benjamin Thomas; Yann Velna; Dorian Carreau; Jonathan Lebreton; Mathieu Dupé	3	Laura Guégan; Claire Cassier; Constance Marchand; Léonie Mahieu
3 February 2024	Slovenia; Novo Mesto	1	Matic Žumer; Mihael Štajnar; Jaka Marolt; Maj Flajs	1	
3 February 2024	Slovenia; Novo Mesto	2	Anže Skok; Tilen Finkšt; Jaka Špoljar; Nejc Peterlin	2	
3 February 2024	Slovenia; Novo Mesto	3	Dan Andrej Tomšič; Domen Oblak; Gašper Kokalj; Natan Gregorčič	3	
23–25 February 2024	United Kingdom; Manchester	1	Sam Fisher; William Roberts; Will Salter; Finlay Tarling	1	Maddie Leech; Grace Lister; Kate Richardson; Izzy Sharp
23–25 February 2024	United Kingdom; Manchester	2	Sebastian Garry; Michael Gill; Will Perrett; Tom Ward	2	Erin Boothman; Carys Lloyd; Abigail Miller; Mari Porton
23–25 February 2024	United Kingdom; Manchester	3	Not awarded	3	Kayla Dinnin; Molly Evans; Isla McCutcheon; Millie Thompson
23–25 February 2024	Spain; Galapagar	1	Sergi Amengual; Francesc Bennassar; Joan Martí Bennassar; Elies Ros; Llorenç Tomás	1	
23–25 February 2024	Spain; Galapagar	2	Mario Álvarez; Alejandro Merenciano; José Segura García; Sergio Serrano	2	
23–25 February 2024	Spain; Galapagar	3	Tomàs Deosdat Omedes; Erik Martorell; Ivan Viladrich; Jaume Villar	3	
1–3 March 2024	Bolivia; Santa Cruz de la Sierra	1		1	
1–3 March 2024	Bolivia; Santa Cruz de la Sierra	2		2	
1–3 March 2024	Bolivia; Santa Cruz de la Sierra	3		3	
1–5 March 2024	Australia; Brisbane	1		1	Alli Anderson; Sophie Edwards; Chloe Moran; Summer Nordmeyer
1–5 March 2024	Australia; Brisbane	2		2	
1–5 March 2024	Australia; Brisbane	3		3	
1–5 March 2024	New Zealand; Cambridge	1	Aaron Gate; Tom Sexton; George Jackson; Keegan Hornblow	1	Meg Baker; Mya Wolfenden; Sophie Maxwell; Kirsty Watts
1–5 March 2024	New Zealand; Cambridge	2	Marshall Erwood; Nick Kergozou; Kyle Aitken; Daniel Bridgwater; Bailey O'Donnell (R)	2	Hannah Bayard; Belle Judd; Bee Townsend; Elena Worrall
1–5 March 2024	New Zealand; Cambridge	3	Lucas Bhimy; Hunter Dalton; Daniel Morton; Bernard Pawson	3	Sammie Walker; Eliana Beale; Lucy Reeve; Lucy Griffin
4–10 March 2024	Brazil; Curitiba	1	Lauro Chaman; Kacio Fonseca; Rafael Augusto Braga; Otávio Gonzeli	1	Alice Melo; Nicolle Borges; Talita de Oliveira; Lara Rodrigues Marinho
4–10 March 2024	Brazil; Curitiba	2	Armando Camargo; Pedro Miguel Freitas; Luan Carlos Rodrigues Silva; Endrigo da Rosa; Felipe Marques (R)	2	Taise Benato; Ana Paula Cassetta; Wellyda Rodrigues; Gabriela da Costa
4–10 March 2024	Brazil; Curitiba	3	Samuel Stachera; Ricardo Dalamaria; Flávio Cipriano; Cristian Egídio	3	Marcella Toldi; Carolina Barbosa; Lutécia Masotti; Juliana Da Silva; Ana Paula Polegatch (R)
21–25 March 2024	South Africa; Cape Town	1	Carl Bonthuys; Ethan Kulsen; Wynand Hofmeyr; Dániyal Matthews	1	
21–25 March 2024	South Africa; Cape Town	2	James Swart; Bradley Gouveris; Kellan Alex Gouveris; Royce Griffin	2	
21–25 March 2024	South Africa; Cape Town	3		3	
25–29 March 2024	Uzbekistan; Tashkent	1	Daniil Fedorov; Danil Evdokimov; Vladislav Troman; Abdulkhamid Tuychiev	1	Sofiya Karimova; Nafosat Kozieva; Ekaterina Knebeleva; Margarita Misyurina
25–29 March 2024	Uzbekistan; Tashkent	2	Artyom Talizenkov; Nikita Eremov; Nursultan Tursunov; Vitaliy Burlakov	2	Samira Ismailova; Madina Kakhkhorova; Asal Rizaeva; Evgeniya Golotina; Kseniya Li
25–29 March 2024	Uzbekistan; Tashkent	3	Abdurahmon Nematov; Alimardon Jamoldinov; Behzodbek Nurmatov; Kamil Yunusbaev	3	Yana Mishinova; Madina Davronova; Nadejda Bartenova; Ekaterina Makarochkeno; Aliye Gaffarova
20–24 May 2024	Malaysia; Nilai	1	Muhammad Afiq Iskandar Hasyim; Muhamad Iqbal Daniel Mohd Nawawi; Ahmad Irfan Abd Hamid; Mohamad Aiman Haiqal Mohammad Khairul	1	Nur Aisyah Mohamad Zubir; Dahlia Hazwani Hasyim; Ameera Alia Md Zahiruddin; Nur Aierin Wadhiah Mohd Adni
20–24 May 2024	Malaysia; Nilai	2	Muhammad Faheem Razen Muhammad Zaini; Muhammad Adam Danish Afdzal; Muhammad Nazirul Aniq Abd Rahman; Zi Hen Heng	2	Phi Kun Pan; Nur Fitrah Shaari; Nurul Nabilah Mohd Asri; Anis Natasya Ahmad
20–24 May 2024	Malaysia; Nilai	3	Zulhelmi Zainal; Muhammad Iskandariah Medina Mohd Hisham; Nasrul Firas Ridzuan; Muhammad Qayyim Mohd Saipul Anuwai	3	
22–27 June 2024	South Korea; Yangyang County	1	Choe Hyeong-min; Jang Kyung-gu; Kim Hwa-rang; Jeong Jae-heon; Lee Jin-gu	1	Lee Ju-mi; Park Do-young; Kang Hyun-kyung; Kim Ok-hui; Kim Hyo-won
22–27 June 2024	South Korea; Yangyang County	2	Park Sang-hoon; Kim Jae-hyun; Somang Joo; Bae Hyoung-jun; Jeon Young-su	2	Hwang Hyeon-seo; Kim Doye; Yoon Seo-yeon; Ko Haseon; No Yunseo; Jieun Shin
22–27 June 2024	South Korea; Yangyang County	3	Kim Kook-hyun; Min Kyeong-ho; Park Ji-hwan; Mideum Joo; Sarang Joo; Kim Sang-pyo	3	Lee Joo-hee; Lee Eun-hee; Song Min-ji; Ha Jie-un; Yu Gae-un; Chun Yun-young
3–7 July 2024	Kazakhstan; Astana	1	Maxim Khoroshavin; Ilya Karabutov; Vladislav Bashlykov; Vladimir Born	1	Svetlana Pachshenko; Bota Batyrbekova; Violetta Kazakova; Dariya Kazakbay
3–7 July 2024	Kazakhstan; Astana	2	Ramis Dinmukhametov; Sergey Karmazhakov; Kirill Strelchenko; Dmitriy Vassilyev	2	Yelena Mandrakova; Marina Kuzmina; Milana Kotelnikova; Damilya Adilbek
3–7 July 2024	Kazakhstan; Astana	3	Assylkhan Turar; Gabiden Azen; Aslan Silykbek; Sayat Aidarkhan	3	
4–7 July 2024	Chinese Taipei; Taichung	1	Lee Dong-ling; Chien Yun-tse; Liao Sheng-yi; Chen Tse-an	1	
4–7 July 2024	Chinese Taipei; Taichung	2		2	
4–7 July 2024	Chinese Taipei; Taichung	3		3	
10–14 July 2024	United States; Carson, California	1	David Domonoske; Anders Johnson; Spencer Seggebruch; Lance Abshire	1	Chloe Patrick; Morgan James; Hayley Bates; Colleen Gulick
10–14 July 2024	United States; Carson, California	2	Merrick Gallagher; Max Haggard; John Bowie; Wyatt Paul	2	Amanda Gonzalez; Lily Katherine Kendall; Julianna Rutecki; Candice Votava
10–14 July 2024	United States; Carson, California	3	William Denman; Alex Siegel; Corey Jameson; Elliott Davis	3	Mackenzie Wells; Megan Mattson; Catherine Hamilton; Jordan Ellison
12–14 July 2024	Thailand; Bangkok	1	Jetsada Janluang; Phurit Rodvilai; Patompob Phonarjthan; Thanawut Sanikwathi; Setthawut Yordsuwan	1	
12–14 July 2024	Thailand; Bangkok	2	Thanapon Wongla; Kantaphon Kunkumpai; Aukkrit Nomai; Peerapon Ladngern	2	
12–14 July 2024	Thailand; Bangkok	3	Wanchana Thampanya; Orrachun Petcharat; Sarayut Pantan; Phuwadol Kotprom; Chirapong Phaksriwong	3	
1–4 August 2024	Greece; Athens	1	Iraklis Balafas; Konstantinos Berdempes; Alexandros Karousos; Konstantinos Ntanovasilis	1	
1–4 August 2024	Greece; Athens	2	Andreas Karnezos; Aristeidis Koutounis; Kyriakos Papastamatakis; Michail Savvakis	2	
1–4 August 2024	Greece; Athens	3	Dionysios Douzas; Dimitrios Gkaliouris; Dimosthenis Kokkalis; Vasileios Tsopouroglou	3	
