= List of Mexican records in track cycling =

The following are the national records in track cycling in Mexico maintained by Mexico's national cycling federation: Federación Mexicana de Ciclismo.

== Men ==
Event	Record	Athlete	Date	Meet	Place	Ref
Flying 200 m time trial	9.897	Juan Ruiz	16 June 2023	Pan American Championships	San Juan, Argentina	
250 m time trial (standing start)	17.935	Juan Ruiz	14 June 2023	Pan American Championships	San Juan, Argentina	
Team sprint	44.037	Jafet López; Juan Ruiz; Edgar Verdugo	24 October 2023	Pan American Games	Santiago, Chile	
1 km time trial	59.765	Juan Ruiz	18 June 2023	Pan American Championships	San Juan, Argentina	
4000m individual pursuit	4:11.375	Sebastián Ruiz	20 February 2026	Pan American Championships	Santiago, Chile	
4000m team pursuit	3:57.392	Fernando Nava; Ricardo Peña; Ignacio Prado; Sebastián Ruiz	18 February 2026	Pan American Championships	Santiago, Chile	
Hour record						

== Women ==
Event	Record	Athlete	Date	Meet	Place	Ref
Flying 200 m time trial	10.344	Daniela Gaxiola	5 September 2019	Pan American Championships	Cochabamba, Bolivia	
250 m time trial (standing start)	18.849	Jessica Salazar	4 September 2019	Pan American Championships	Cochabamba, Bolivia	
500 m time trial	32.268 WR	Jessica Salazar	7 October 2016	Pan American Championships	Aguascalientes, Mexico	
500 m time trial (sea level)	33.826	Jessica Salazar	2 March 2019	World Championships	Pruszków, Poland	
Team sprint (500 m)	32.455	Jessica Salazar; Yuli Verdugo	4 September 2019	Pan American Championships	Cochabamba, Bolivia	
Team sprint (750 m)	46.198	Daniela Gaxiola; Yuli Verdugo; Jessica Salazar	5 August 2024	Olympic Games	Saint-Quentin-en-Yvelines, France	
1 km time trial	1:06.245	Daniela Gaxiola	21 February 2026	Pan American Championships	Santiago, Chile	
3000m individual pursuit	3:36.703	Sofía Arreola	19 January 2013	World Cup	Aguascalientes, Mexico	
4000m individual pursuit	4:48.651	María Fernanda Figueroa	21 February 2026	Pan American Championships	Santiago, Chile	
3000m team pursuit	3:34.536	Marcela Prieto; Mayra del Rocio; Ana Teresa Casas	7 February 2013	Pan American Championships	Mexico City, Mexico	
4000m team pursuit	4:23.708	Anet Barrera; Antonieta Gaxiola; Sofía Arreola; Yareli Acevedo	19 February 2026	Pan American Championships	Santiago, Chile	
Hour record						
