= Cycling at the 2023 Pan American Games – Men's sprint =

Men's sprint at the 2023 Pan American Games
- Venue: Velodrome
- Dates: October 25 - October 26
- Competitors: 19 from 11 nations

Medalists
Gold medal	Nicholas Paul	Trinidad and Tobago
Silver medal	Jaïr Tjon En Fa	Suriname
Bronze medal	Kevin Quintero	Colombia

The men's sprint competition of the cycling events at the 2023 Pan American Games was held from October 25 to 26 at the Velodrome in Santiago, Chile.

== Records ==
Prior to this competition, the existing world and Games records were as follows:

World record	Nicholas Paul (TTO)	9.100	Cochabamba, Bolivia	4 September 2019
Games record	Nicholas Paul (TTO)	9.808	Lima, Peru	2 August 2019

== Schedule ==
Date	Time	Round
October 25, 2023	10:05	Qualification
October 25, 2023	10:42	Eighth-finals
October 25, 2023	11:00	Repechage
October 25, 2023	18:05	Quarterfinals
October 25, 2023	19:29	Race For 5th-8th Places
October 26, 2023	11:11	Semifinals
October 26, 2023	19:00	Finals

== Results ==
=== Qualification ===
Fastest 12 riders continue to the eighth-finals.

Rank	Name	Nation	Time	Notes
1	Nicholas Paul	Trinidad and Tobago	9.574	Q, GR
2	Nick Wammes	Canada	9.689	Q
3	Jaïr Tjon En Fa	Suriname	9.703	Q
4	Fabián Puerta	Colombia	9.806	Q
5	Kevin Quintero	Colombia	9.814	Q
6	Cristian Ortega	Colombia	9.836	Q
7	Tyler Rorke	Canada	9.909	Q
8	Lucas Vilar	Argentina	9.958	Q
9	Edgar Verdugo	Mexico	9.981	Q
10	João Vitor da Silva	Brazil	10.019	Q
11	Kwesi Browne	Trinidad and Tobago	10.073	Q
12	Juan Carlos Ruíz	Mexico	10.108	Q
13	Juan Bautista	Argentina	10.134	
14	Jamie Alvord	United States	10.147	
15	Luis Yáñez	Venezuela	10.154	
16	Evan Boone	United States	10.308	
17	Joaquín Fuenzalida	Chile	10.432	
18	Diego Fuenzalida	Chile	10.625	
19	Alexis Domínguez	Paraguay	10.638	

=== Eighth-finals ===
The winners of each advance to the quarterfinals, while the losers advance to the repechage.

Heat	Rank	Name	Nation	Time	Notes
1	1	Nicholas Paul	Trinidad and Tobago		Q
1	2	Juan Carlos Ruíz	Mexico		
2	1	Nick Wammes	Canada		Q
2	2	Kwesi Browne	Trinidad and Tobago		
3	1	Jaïr Tjon En Fa	Suriname		Q
3	2	João Vitor da Silva	Brazil		
4	1	Fabián Puerta	Colombia		Q
4	2	Edgar Verdugo	Mexico		
5	1	Kevin Quintero	Colombia		Q
5	2	Lucas Vilar	Argentina		
6	1	Tyler Rorke	Canada		Q
6	2	Cristian Ortega	Colombia		

=== Repechage ===
The winner of each advanced to the quarterfinals.

Heat	Rank	Name	Nation	Time	Notes
1	1	Edgar Verdugo	Mexico		Q
1	2	Juan Carlos Ruíz	Mexico		
1	3	Lucas Vilar	Argentina		
2	1	Cristian Ortega	Colombia		Q
2	2	Kwesi Browne	Trinidad and Tobago		
2	3	João Vitor da Silva	Brazil		

=== Quarterfinals ===
The winner of each advanced to the semifinals.

Heat	Rank	Name	Nation	Race 1	Race 2	Decide	Notes
1	1	Nicholas Paul	Trinidad and Tobago				Q
1	2	Cristian Ortega	Colombia				
2	1	Nick Wammes	Canada				Q
2	2	Edgar Verdugo	Mexico				
3	1	Jaïr Tjon En Fa	Suriname				Q
3	2	Tyler Rorke	Canada				
4	1	Kevin Quintero	Colombia				Q
4	2	Fabián Puerta	Colombia				

=== Race for 5th–8th Places ===
Rank	Name	Nation	Time	Notes
5	Fabián Puerta	Colombia		
6	Cristian Ortega	Colombia		
7	Tyler Rorke	Canada		
8	Edgar Verdugo	Mexico		

=== Semifinals ===
The winner of each advanced to the final.

Heat	Rank	Name	Nation	Race 1	Race 2	Decide	Notes
1	1	Nicholas Paul	Trinidad and Tobago	9.768	9.760		Q
1	2	Kevin Quintero	Colombia				
2	1	Jaïr Tjon En Fa	Suriname		10.103	10.478	Q
2	2	Nick Wammes	Canada	10.161			

=== Finals ===
The final classification is determined in the medal finals.

Rank	Name	Nation	Race 1	Race 2	Decide	Notes
Gold medal final
1st place, gold medalist(s)	Nicholas Paul	Trinidad and Tobago	9.978	10.205		
2nd place, silver medalist(s)	Jaïr Tjon En Fa	Suriname				
Bronze medal final
3rd place, bronze medalist(s)	Kevin Quintero	Colombia	10.161	10.109		
4	Nick Wammes	Canada				
