= List of Chilean records in track cycling =

The following are the national records in track cycling in Chile maintained by its national cycling federation, Federación Ciclista de Chile.

== Men ==
Event	Record	Athlete	Date	Meet	Place	Ref
Flying 200 m time trial	10.100	Felipe Monardes	6 September 2019	Pan American Championships	Cochabamba, Bolivia	
250 m time trial (standing start)	18.650	Mariano Lecaros	24 October 2023	Pan American Games	Santiago, Chile	
500 m time trial						
1 km time trial	1:01.602	Felipe Monardes	8 September 2019	Pan American Championships	Cochabamba, Bolivia	
Team sprint	45.960	Mariano Lecaros; Joaquín Fuenzalida; Diego Fuenzalida	24 October 2023	Pan American Games	Santiago, Chile	
4000m individual pursuit	4:11.802	Diego Rojas	20 February 2026	Pan American Championships	Santiago, Chile	
4000m team pursuit	3:51.467	Luciano Carrizo; Jacob Decar; Martín Mancilla; Diego Rojas	19 February 2026	Pan American Championships	Santiago, Chile	
Hour record						

== Women ==
Event	Record	Athlete	Date	Meet	Place	Ref
Flying 200 m time trial	11.338	Daniela Colilef	22 September 2026	South American Games	Rafaela, Argentina	
250 m time trial (standing start)	20.043	Martina Rojas	14 June 2023	Pan American Championships	San Juan, Argentina	
500 m time trial	35.987	Daniela Colilef	1 September 2018	Pan American Championships	Aguascalientes, Mexico	
1 km time trial	1:08.224	Paola Muñoz	21 February 2026	Pan American Championships	Santiago, Chile	
Team sprint (500 m)	35.385	Paula Molina; Renata Urrutia	4 September 2019	Pan American Championships	Cochabamba, Bolivia	
Team sprint (750 m)	49.586	Paula Molina; Daniela Colilef; Paola Muñoz	18 February 2026	Pan American Championships	Santiago, Chile	
3000m individual pursuit	3:49.511	Daniela Guajardo	23 November 2017	Bolivarian Games	Cali, Colombia	
4000m individual pursuit	4:48.230	Aranza Villalón	21 February 2026	Pan American Championships	Santiago, Chile	
3000m team pursuit						
4000m team pursuit	4:23.928	Scarlet Cortés; Javiera Garrido; Maite Ibarra; Aranza Villalón	19 February 2026	Pan American Championships	Santiago, Chile	
Hour record						
