= List of Ecuadorian records in track cycling =

The following are the national records in track cycling in Ecuador, maintained by its national cycling federation, Federación Ecuatoriana de Ciclismo.

== Men ==
Event	Record	Athlete	Date	Meet	Place	Ref
Flying 200 m time trial	10.150	Alan Lozano	6 September 2019	Pan American Championships	Cochabamba, Bolivia	
250 m time trial (standing start)	18.807	Alan Lozano	4 September 2019	Pan American Championships	Cochabamba, Bolivia	
Flying 500 m time trial	29.766	Luis Alban	6 October 2016	Pan American Championships	Aguascalientes, Mexico	
500 m time trial						
Flying 1 km time trial						
1 km time trial	1:02.422	Alan Lozano	8 September 2019	Pan American Championships	Cochabamba, Bolivia	
Team sprint	45.200		4 September 2019	Pan American Championships	Cochabamba, Bolivia	
4000 m individual pursuit	4:41.76	Alexis Quinteros	23 November 2017	Bolivarian Games	Cali, Colombia	
4000 m team pursuit	4:28.796		21 November 2017	Bolivarian Games	Cali, Colombia	
Hour record						

== Women ==
Event	Record	Athlete	Date	Meet	Place	Ref
Flying 200 m time trial	11.537	Ruth Perdomo	22 September 2026	South American Games	Rafaela, Argentina	
250 m time trial (standing start)	21.546	Ruth Perdomo	17 June 2023	Pan American Championships	San Juan, Argentina	
Flying 500 m time trial						
500 m time trial	37.530	Ruth Perdomo	17 June 2023	Pan American Championships	San Juan, Argentina	
Flying 1 km time trial						
1 km time trial	1:11.848	Jacabed Perdomo	5 April 2025	Pan American Championships	Asunción, Paraguay	
Team sprint						
3000 m individual pursuit						
3000 m team pursuit						
Hour record						
