= 2022 UCI Track Cycling Nations Cup =

International track cycling competition

- Second edition of the UCI Track Cycling Nations Cup

Details
- Dates: 21 April – 10 July 2022
- Location: United Kingdom; Canada; Colombia
- Races: 3

The 2022 UCI Track Cycling Nations Cup (also known as the Tissot UCI Track Cycling Nations Cup for sponsorship reasons) was a multi-race tournament over a track cycling season. It was the second series of the UCI Track Cycling Nations Cup organised by the UCI.

== Series ==
3 rounds were scheduled:

Date	Location
21-24 April	Glasgow, United Kingdom
12-15 May	Milton, Canada
7-10 July	Cali, Colombia

== Standings ==
=== Men ===
Sprint

Rank	after 3 rounds	Points
1	(Netherlands) Harrie Lavreysen	1520
2	(Australia) Matthew Richardson	1520
3	(Trinidad and Tobago) Nicholas Paul	1400
4	(Netherlands) Jeffrey Hoogland	1360
5	(United Kingdom) Jack Carlin	1200

Team Sprint

Rank	after 3 rounds	Points
1	China	2280
2	Colombia	2220
3	Netherlands	2160
4	United Kingdom	1740
5	Poland	1740

Individual Pursuit

Rank	after 3 rounds	Points
1	(Italy) Davide Plebani	1600
2	(Germany) Nicolas Heinrich	1520
3	(Germany) Tobias Buck-Gramcko	1320
4	(China) Cheng Tingzhuang	968
5	(Italy) Jonathan Milan	800

Team Pursuit

Rank	after 3 rounds	Points
1	Italy	4240
2	China	2480
3	Germany	2400
4	Uzbekistan	1616
5	Australia	1600

1 km Time Trial

Rank	after 3 rounds	Points
1	(Colombia) Santiago Ramírez	1960
2	(France) Melvin Landerneau	1360
3	(Colombia) Cristian Ortega	1320
4	(Spain) Alejandro Martínez	1200
5	(Italy) Davide Boscaro	1160

Keirin

Rank	after 3 rounds	Points
1	(Colombia) Kevin Quintero	1520
2	(Australia) Matthew Richardson	1360
3	(Netherlands) Harrie Lavreysen	1280
4	(Germany) Stefan Bötticher	1240
5	(Colombia) Santiago Ramírez	1041

Omnium

Rank	after 3 rounds	Points
1	(United States) Gavin Hoover	1320
2	(Colombia) Juan Esteban Arango	1200
3	(Germany) Tim Torn Teutenberg	1080
4	(Netherlands) Jan Willem van Schip	896
5	(Italy) Matteo Donega	800

Elimination Race

Rank	after 3 rounds	Points
1	(Netherlands) Yoeri Havik (BEAT Cycling)	1440
2	(Canada) Mathias Guillemette	1272
3	(Germany) Tim Torn Teutenberg	1200
4	(Japan) Eiya Hashimoto (Team Bridgestone Cycling)	1040
5	(Trinidad and Tobago) Akil Campbell	720

Madison

Rank	after 3 rounds	Points
1	Italy	3760
2	Mexico	2640
3	Japan	2480
4	Colombia	2432
5	Belgium	2240

=== Women ===
Sprint

Rank	after 3 round	Points
1	(Colombia) Martha Bayona	2000
2	(Netherlands) Laurine van Riessen (BEAT Cycling)	1840
3	(Canada) Kelsey Mitchell	1520
4	(France) Mathilde Gros	1360
5	(Canada) Lauriane Genest	1120

Team Sprint

Rank	after 3 rounds	Points
1	Netherlands	3360
2	Canada	2040
5	China	1800
3	Great Britain	1800
4	Colombia	1680

Individual Pursuit

Rank	after 3 rounds	Points
1	(China) Wang Susu	1080
2	(China) Guan Siq	928
3	(Italy) Letizia Paternoster	800
4	(Australia) Maeve Plouffe	800
5	(Germany) Mieke Kroger	800

Team Pursuit

Rank	after 3 rounds	Points
1	Italy	2880
2	China	2720
3	United States	2160
4	Switzerland	1760
5	Germany	1600

500 m Time Trial

Rank	after 3 rounds	Points
1	(Colombia) Martha Bayona	2160
2	(Italy) Miriam Vece	1360
3	(Germany) Pauline Grabosch	1240
4	(Netherlands) Kyra Lamberink	1240
5	(China) Zhang Linyin	1040

Keirin

Rank	after 3 rounds	Points
1	(Colombia) Martha Bayona	1960
2	(Netherlands) Steffie van der Peet	1720
3	(Netherlands) Laurine van Riessen (BEAT Cycling)	1360
4	(France) Mathilde Gros	1320
5	(Canada) Kelsey Mitchell	1320

Omnium

Rank	after 3 rounds	Points
1	(United States) Jennifer Valente	1520
2	(Japan) Yumi Kajihara	1400
3	(Mexico) Victoria Velasco	1080
4	(Norway) Anita Stenberg	1040
5	(Greece) Argiro Milaki	936

Elimination Race

Rank	after 3 rounds	Points
1	(United States) Jennifer Valente	1600
2	(Switzerland) Michelle Andres	1040
3	(Spain) Tania Calvo	920
4	(Mexico) Yareli Acevedo	832
5	(Japan) Yumi Kajihara	800

Madison

Rank	after 3 rounds	Points
2	Italy	4480
1	United States	3360
3	Australia	2480
4	Ireland	2240
5	Germany	2000

== Overall team standings ==
Overall team standings are calculated based on total number of points gained by the team's riders in each event.

Rank	Team	(United Kingdom)	(Canada)	(Colombia)	Total Points
1	Italy	11394	13680	10488	35562
2	Colombia	8161	5832	16908	30901
3	Germany	13045	15009	2240	30294
4	China		12065	16832.	28897
5	Netherlands	9528	9760	7440	26728
6	Australia	9385	14032		23417
7	Canada	7088	13900	1937	22925
8	Great Britain	11484	9960		21444
9	France	14796		4360.0	19156
10	United States	3905	8401	6600	18906

== Results ==
=== Men ===
Event	Winner	Second	Third
Great Britain, Glasgow | 21–24 April
Sprint; Details	Harrie Lavreysen (NED); 10.083/10.130	Matthew Richardson (AUS) +0.100/+0.247	Sébastien Vigier (FRA) no race
Team Sprint; Details	Australia; Thomas Cornish; Leigh Hoffman; Matthew Richardson 42.532	France 2 Florian Grengbo; Rayan Helal; Sébastien Vigier 42.673	Netherlands; Harrie Lavreysen; Roy van den Berg; Tijmen van Loon; Sam Ligtlee; 43.343
Individual Pursuit; Details	Corentin Ermenault (FRA); 4:05.644	Nicolas Heinrich (GER); 4:09.371	Charlie Tanfield (GBR); 4:09.209
Team Pursuit; Details	France 1 Benjamin Thomas; Thomas Denis; Corentin Ermenault; Eddy le Huitouze; 3:50.267	Great Britain 1 Ethan Vernon; Oliver Wood; Rhys Britton; Charlie Tanfield; 3:51.638	Denmark; Tobias Hansen; Rasmus Pedersen; Carl-Frederik Bévort; Robin Skivild; 3:50.986
1 km Time Trial; Details	Cristian Ortega (COL); 1:00.325	Melvin Landerneau (FRA); 1:00.700	Alejandro Martínez (ESP); 1:00.832
Keirin; Details	Harrie Lavreysen (NED)	Kevin Quintero (COL)	Matthew Richardson (AUS)
Omnium; Details	Oliver Wood (GBR) (Team Inspired); 145 pts.	Sebastián Mora (ESP) 134 pts.	Fabio Van den Bossche (BEL) 110 pts.
Elimination Race; Details	Elia Viviani (ITA)	Yoeri Havik (NED) (BEAT Cycling)	Tim Torn Teutenberg (GER)
Madison; Details	France; Thomas Boudat; Benjamin Thomas; 66 pts.	Japan; Shunsuke Imamura; Kazushige Kuboki; 63 pts.	Italy; Michele Scartezzini; Simone Consonni; 49 pts.
Canada, Milton | 12–15 May
Sprint; Details	Matthew Richardson (AUS) 9.956/9.945	Jeffrey Hoogland (NED) +0.206/+5.249	Jack Carlin (GBR) (Team Inspired); 10.285/10.315
Team Sprint; Details	Netherlands; Jeffrey Hoogland; Sam Ligtlee; Roy van den Berg; Tijmen van Loon; 43.309	China A Liu Qi; Luo Yongjia; Zhou Yu 43.401	Germany; Stefan Bötticher; Marc Jurczyk; Paul Schippert 43.996
Individual Pursuit; Details	Nicolas Heinrich (GER); 4:07.691	Tobias Buck-Gramcko (GER); 4:09.266	James Moriarty (AUS); 4:14.177
Team Pursuit; Details	Australia; Graeme Frislie; James Moriarty; Josh Duffy; Conor Leahy 3:56.042	Italy; Davide Plebani; Carloalberto Giordani; Stefano Moro; Mattia Pinazzi; Davide Boscaro; OVL	Germany; Tobias Buck-Gramcko; Nicolas Heinrich; Leon Rohde; Domenic Weinstein; Theo Reinhardt; 3:53.818
1 km Time Trial; Details	Xue Chenxi (CHN); 1:00.754	Nick Kergozou (NZL); 1:01.013	Santiago Ramírez (COL); 1:01.105
Keirin; Details	Kevin Quintero (COL)	Matthew Richardson (AUS)	Stefan Bötticher (GER)
Omnium; Details	Ethan Hayter (GBR); 163 pts.	Gavin Hoover (USA); 128 pts.	Jan-Willem van Schip (NED); 125 pts.
Elimination Race; Details	Jules Hesters (BEL)	Yoeri Havik (NED)	Gavin Hoover (USA)
Madison; Details	Netherlands; Yoeri Havik; Jan-Willem van Schip; 74 pts.	Great Britain; Ethan Hayter; Rhys Britton; 66 pts.	Germany; Theo Reinhardt; Tim Torn Teutenberg; 47 pts.
Scratch; Details	Rhys Britton (GBR)	Erik Martorell (ESP)	Mattia Pinazzi (ITA)
Colombia, Cali | 7–10 July
Sprint; Details	Nicholas Paul (TTO); 9.802/9.814	Harrie Lavreysen (NED) +0.113/+0.012	Jeffrey Hoogland (NED); 10.245/10.780
Team Sprint; Details	China; Lu Jiachen; Xue Chenxi; Zhou Yu; 43.471	Colombia A Cristian Ortega; Kevin Quintero; Santiago Ramírez; 44.422	Colombia B Carlos Echeverri; Rubén Murillo; Juan Ochoa; 44.249
Individual Pursuit; Details	Jonathan Milan (ITA); 4:05.373	Davide Plebani (ITA); OVL	Cheng Tingzhuang (CHN); 4:18.932
Team Pursuit; Details	Italy; Francesco Lamon; Michele Scartezzini; Liam Bertazzo; Jonathan Milan; Davide Plebani; 3:55.081	China; Yang Yang; Jiang Zhihui; Qiu Zhentao; Sun Haijiao; Zhang Haiao; 3:57.810	Colombia A Juan Esteban Arango; Jordan Parra; Bryan Gómez; Brayan Sánchez
1 km Time Trial; Details	Maximilian Dornbach (GER); 59.414	Santiago Ramírez (COL); 59.581	Melvin Landerneau (FRA); 59.995
Keirin; Details	Nicholas Paul (TTO)	Jai Angsuthasawit (THA)	Sam Dakin (NZL)
Omnium; Details	Matteo Donega (ITA); 116 pts.	Bernard Benyamin van Aert (INA); 114 pts.	Juan Esteban Arango (COL); 113 pts.
Elimination Race; Details	Akil Campbell (TTO)	Michele Scartezzini (ITA)	Jordan Parra (COL)
Madison; Details	Italy; Francesco Lamon; Michele Scartezzini; 106 pts.	Mexico; Ricardo Pena; Jorge Peyrot; 72 pts.	Colombia; Juan Esteban Arango; Jordan Parra; 42 pts.

=== Women ===
Event	Winner	Second	Third
Great Britain, Glasgow | 21–24 April
Sprint; Details	Kelsey Mitchell (CAN) 10.873/10.955	Laurine van Riessen (NED) (BEAT Cycling) +0.235/+0.134	Martha Bayona (COL) 11.383/11.229
Team Sprint; Details	Netherlands; Kyra Lamberink; Steffie van der Peet; Hetty van de Wouw; Laurine van Riessen; 47.461	Canada; Lauriane Genest; Kelsey Mitchell; Sarah Orban 47.820	Wales; Rhian Edmunds; Emma Finucane; Lowri Thomas 47.813
Individual Pursuit; Details	Mieke Kröger (GER); 3:25.354	Franziska Brauße (GER); 3:25.471	Josie Knight (GBR); 3:27.561
Team Pursuit; Details	Germany; Franziska Brauße; Lisa Klein; Mieke Kröger; Laura Süßemilch 4:13.421	Great Britain 1 Katie Archibald; Neah Evans; Laura Kenny; Josie Knight; Megan Barker; 4:18.908	Italy; Elisa Balsamo; Rachele Barbieri; Martina Alzini; Vittoria Guazzini; Chiara Consonni; 4:14.423
500 m Time Trial; Details	Martha Bayona (COL); 33.473	Miriam Vece (ITA); 33.851	Kyra Lamberink (NED); 33.873
Keirin; Details	Mathilde Gros (FRA)	Martha Bayona (COL)	Lauriane Genest (CAN)
Omnium; Details	Yumi Kajihara (JPN); 101 pts.	Maike van der Duin (NED); 99 pts.	Lotte Kopecky (BEL); 97 pts.
Elimination Race; Details	Yumi Kajihara (JPN)	Valentine Fortin (FRA)	Ally Wollaston (NZL)
Madison; Details	France; Marion Borras; Valentine Fortin; 33 pts.	Italy; Elisa Balsamo; Vittoria Guazzini; 23 pts.	Denmark; Amalie Dideriksen; Julie Leth; 18 pts.
Canada, Milton | 12–15 May
Sprint; Details	Emma Hinze (GER); 11.021/11.132	Kelsey Mitchell (CAN) +0.019/+0.008	Martha Bayona (COL); 11.084/11.137
Team Sprint; Details	Germany; Lea Friedrich; Pauline Grabosch; Emma Hinze 46.807	Netherlands; Kyra Lamberink; Hetty van de Wouw; Laurine van Riessen; Steffie van der Peet; 47.421	Canada; Lauriane Genest; Kelsey Mitchell; Sarah Orban; Jackie Boyle; 47.817
Individual Pursuit; Details	Maeve Plouffe (AUS); 3:29.324	Vittoria Bussi (ITA); 3:32.210	Silvia Zanardi (ITA); 3:31.924
Team Pursuit; Details	Italy; Elisa Balsamo; Silvia Zanardi; Chiara Consonni; Martina Fidanza; Barbara Guarischi; 4:17.522	Australia; Sophie Edwards; Alyssa Polites; Chloe Moran; Maeve Plouffe; Amber Pate; 4:21.126	United States; Jennifer Valente; Lily Williams; Megan Jastrab; Shayna Powless 4:21.169
500 m Time Trial; Details	Kristina Clonan (AUS); 32.987	Pauline Grabosch (GER); 33.460	Miriam Vece (ITA); 33.688
Keirin; Details	Kelsey Mitchell (CAN)	Mina Sato (JPN) (Team Rakuten K Dreams)	Lauriane Genest (CAN)
Omnium; Details	Elisa Balsamo (ITA); 117 pts.	Jennifer Valente (USA); 110 pts.	Alexandra Manly (AUS); 104 pts.
Elimination Race; Details	Jennifer Valente (USA)	Silvia Zanardi (ITA)	Sophie Lewis (GBR)
Madison; Details	Italy; Elisa Balsamo; Chiara Consonni; 54 pts.	Australia; Alexandra Manly; Chloe Moran; 45 pts.	Ireland; Mia Griffin; Alice Sharpe; 29 pts.
Scratch; Details	Martina Fidanza (ITA)	Lonneke Uneken (NED)	Lily Williams (USA)
Colombia, Cali | 7–10 July
Sprint; Details	Mathilde Gros (FRA) +0.108/11.229/11.428	Martha Bayona (COL); 11.021/+0.001/+0.191	Ellesse Andrews (NZL); 11.101/11.181
Team Sprint; Details	China; Guo Yufang; Yuan Liying; Zhang Linyin; 47.144	Netherlands; Shanne Braspennincx; Hetty van de Wouw; Laurine van Riessen; 47.265	France; Mathilde Gros; Marie Kouame; Julie Michaux; 47.593
Individual Pursuit; Details	Letizia Paternoster (ITA); 3:25.310	Samantha Donnelly (NZL); 3:33.456	Wang Susu (CHN); 3:33.895
Team Pursuit; Details	China; Huang Zhilin; Wang Susu; Wang Xiaoyue; Zhang Hongjie; Liu Jiali; 4:22.516	New Zealand; Michaela Drummond; Ella Wyllie; Samantha Donnelly; Emily Shearman; Prudence Fowler; 4:24.616	Colombia; Mariana Herrera; Sérika Gulumá; Jennifer Sanchez; Camila Valbuena
500 m Time Trial; Details	Martha Bayona (COL) 32.952	Guo Yufang (CHN) (Henan Bodywrap Cycling Team); 32.957	Yuan Liying (CHN) 33.539
Keirin; Details	Martha Bayona (COL)	Ellesse Andrews (NZL)	Shanne Braspennincx (NED)
Omnium; Details	Jennifer Valente (USA); 137 pts.	Victoria Velasco (MEX); 117 pts.	Liu Jiali (CHN); 111 pts.
Elimination Race; Details	Jennifer Valente (USA)	Letizia Paternoster (ITA)	Yareli Acevedo (MEX)
Madison; Details	United States; Colleen Gulick; Jennifer Valente; 48 pts.	Italy; Francesca Selva; Letizia Paternoster; 35 pts.	New Zealand; Michaela Drummond; Ella Wyllie; 29 pts.

== Medal table ==
Rank	Team	Gold	Silver	Bronze	Total
1	Italy	10	9	5	24
2	Germany	6	4	5	15
3	France	6	3	3	12
4	Netherlands	5	7	5	17
5	Colombia	5	5	9	19
6	Australia	5	4	3	12
7	China	4	2	4	10
8	United States	4	2	3	9
9	Trinidad and Tobago	3	0	0	3
10	Great Britain	2	3	3	8
11	Canada	2	2	3	7
12	Japan	2	1	0	3
13	Belgium	1	0	2	3
14	Team Inspired	1	0	1	2
15	New Zealand	0	4	4	8
16	Mexico	0	2	1	3
16	Spain	0	2	1	3
18	BEAT Cycling	0	2	0	2
19	Henan Bodywrap Cycling Team	0	1	0	1
19	Indonesia	0	1	0	1
19	Team Rakuten K Dreams	0	1	0	1
19	Thailand	0	1	0	1
23	Denmark	0	0	2	2
24	Ireland	0	0	1	1
24	Wales	0	0	1	1
Totals (25 entries)		56	56	56	168
