= List of Brazilian records in track cycling =

The following are the national records in track cycling in Brazil maintained by Brazil's national cycling federation: Confederação Brasileira de Ciclismo (CBC).

== Men ==
Event	Record	Athlete	Date	Meet	Place	Ref
Flying 200 m time trial	9.726	João Vitor da Silva	6 September 2019	Pan American Championships	Cochabamba, Bolivia	
250 m time trial (standing start)	17.505	Flavio Cipriano	16 July 2015	Pan American Games	Milton, Canada	
Flying 500 m time trial						
500 m time trial						
Flying 1 km time trial						
1 km time trial	1:01.404	João Vitor da Silva	22 February 2026	Pan American Championships	Santiago, Chile	
1 km time trial (sea level)	1:01.404	João Vitor da Silva	22 February 2026	Pan American Championships	Santiago, Chile	
Team sprint	43.860	Flavio Cipriano; João Vitor da Silva; Kacio Freitas	29 August 2018	Pan American Championships	Aguascalientes, Mexico	
4000m individual pursuit	4:30.099	Thiago Nardin	7 February 2013	Pan American Championships	Mexico City, Mexico	
4000m team pursuit	4:12.324	Cristian Egidio da Rosa; Endrigo Pereira; Thiago Nardin; Gideoni Monteiro	18 July 2015	Pan American Games	Milton, Canada	
Hour record						

== Women ==
Event	Record	Athlete	Date	Meet	Place	Ref
Flying 200 m time trial	11.191	Tatiele de Sousa	5 September 2019	Pan American Championships	Cochabamba, Bolivia	
Flying 500 m time trial						
250 m time trial (standing start)	20.220	Carolina Alves do Nascimento	17 June 2023	Pan American Championships	San Juan, Argentina	
500 m time trial	35.291	Tatiele de Sousa	7 September 2019	Pan American Championships	Cochabamba, Bolivia	
500 m time trial	35.291	Carolina Alves do Nascimento	17 June 2023	Pan American Championships	San Juan, Argentina	
500 m time trial (sea level)	35.291	Carolina Alves do Nascimento	17 June 2023	Pan American Championships	San Juan, Argentina	
Flying 1 km time trial						
1 km time trial						
Team sprint						
3000m individual pursuit	3:55.527	Ana Paula Polegatch	2 August 2014	National Championships	Maringá, Brazil	
3000m team pursuit						
Hour record						
