= List of Costa Rican records in track cycling =

The following are the national records in track cycling in Costa Rica, maintained by its national cycling federation, Federacion Costarricense de Ciclismo (FECOCI).

== Men ==
Event	Record	Athlete	Date	Meet	Place	Ref
Flying 200 m time trial	10.923	Nayib Leandrol	16 June 2023	Pan American Championships	San Juan, Argentina	
250 m time trial (standing start)	20.361	Nayib Leandro	8 September 2019	Pan American Championships	Cochabamba, Bolivia	
Flying 500 m time trial	31.607	Antthony Sanchez	6 October 2016	Pan American Championships	Aguascalientes, Mexico	
500 m time trial						
Flying 1 km time trial						
1 km time trial	1:04.141	Nayib Leandro	8 September 2019	Pan American Championships	Cochabamba, Bolivia	
Team sprint						
4000 m individual pursuit						
4000 m team pursuit						
Hour record						

== Women ==
Event	Record	Athlete	Date	Meet	Place	Ref
Flying 200 m time trial	11.600	Abigail Recio	1 July 2023	CAC Games	San Salvador, El Salvador	
250 m time trial (standing start)	20.969	Carvajal Recio	17 June 2023	Pan American Championships	San Juan, Argentina	
500 m time trial	37.112	Carvajal Recio	17 June 2023	Pan American Championships	San Juan, Argentina	
Flying 1 km time trial						
1 km time trial						
Team sprint						
3000 m individual pursuit						
3000 m team pursuit						
Hour record						
