= Cycling at the 2023 Pan American Games – Men's madison =

Men's madison at the 2023 Pan American Games
- Venue: Velodrome
- Dates: October 27
- Competitors: 14 from 7 nations

Medalists
Gold medal	Fernando Nava; Ricardo Peña	Mexico
Silver medal	Juan Esteban Arango; Jordan Parra	Colombia
Bronze medal	Colby Lange; Grant Koontz	United States

The men's madison competition of the cycling events at the 2023 Pan American Games was held from October 27 at the Velodrome in Santiago, Chile.

== Schedule ==
Date	Time	Round
October 27, 2023	20:21	Final

== Results ==
The final classification is determined in the medal finals.

Rank	Name	Nation	Laps points	Sprint points	Total points
1st place, gold medalist(s)	Fernando Nava; Ricardo Peña	Mexico	20	70	90
2nd place, silver medalist(s)	Juan Esteban Arango; Jordan Parra	Colombia	0	46	46
3rd place, bronze medalist(s)	Colby Lange; Grant Koontz	United States	20	23	43
4	Cristian Arriagada; Jacob Decar	Chile	0	43	43
5	Chris Ernst; Michael Foley	Canada	0	33	33
	Armando Reis; Kacio Fonseca	Brazil	–40	7	DNF
	Marcos Méndez; Tomás Contte	Argentina	0	0	DSQ
