= Juan Arango (cyclist) =

Colombian cyclist (born 1986)

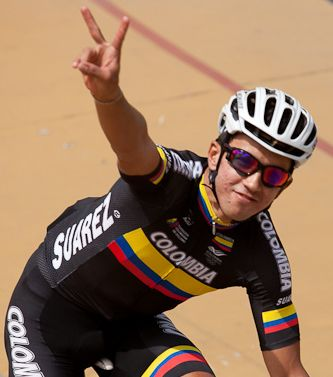

Personal information
- Full name: Juan Esteban Arango Carvajal
- Born: 9 October 1986 (age 40) Medellín, Colombia
- Height: 1.72 m (5 ft 8 in)
- Weight: 62 kg (137 lb)

Cycling career
- Sport: Cycling
- Disciplines: Road cycling; Track cycling
- Role: Rider

Amateur team
- 2015–2016: Coldeportes–Claro

Professional teams
- 2013–2014: Colombia
- 2017: Medellín–Inder
Medal record
Representing Colombia
Men's track cycling
Event	1st	2nd	3rd
World Championships	0	1	0
Nations Cup	0	3	0
Nations Cup stage	6	6	5
Pan American Games	3	3	1
Pan American Championships	7	14	3
CAC Games	8	4	1
South American Games	4	2	0
Bolivarian Games	13	2	0
Total	41	35	10
World Championships
Silver medal – second place	2010 Ballerup	Scratch
Nations Cup
Silver medal – second place	2021	Team pursuit
Silver medal – second place	2022	Omnium
World Cup
Silver medal – second place	2011-12	Omnium
Pan American Games
Gold medal – first place	2011 Guadalajara	Omnium
Gold medal – first place	2011 Guadalajara	Team pursuit
Gold medal – first place	2015 Toronto	Team pursuit
Silver medal – second place	2019 Lima	Team pursuit
Silver medal – second place	2023 Santiago	Madison
Silver medal – second place	2023 Santiago	Team pursuit
Bronze medal – third place	2019 Lima	Madison
Pan American Championships
Gold medal – first place	2011 Medellín	Team pursuit
Gold medal – first place	2015 Santiago	Omnium
Gold medal – first place	2015 Santiago	Team pursuit
Gold medal – first place	2016 Aguascalientes	Points race
Gold medal – first place	2016 Aguascalientes	Team pursuit
Gold medal – first place	2021 Lima	Team pursuit
Gold medal – first place	2023 San Juan	Points race
Silver medal – second place	2007 Valencia	Omnium
Silver medal – second place	2010 Aguascalientes	Individual pursuit
Silver medal – second place	2011 Medellín	Individual pursuit
Silver medal – second place	2015 Santiago	Madison
Silver medal – second place	2018 Aguascalientes	Team pursuit
Silver medal – second place	2021 Lima	Omnium
Silver medal – second place	2021 Lima	Madison
Silver medal – second place	2022 Lima	Madison
Silver medal – second place	2022 Lima	Team pursuit
Silver medal – second place	2023 San Juan	Madison
Silver medal – second place	2023 San Juan	Team pursuit
Silver medal – second place	2024 Carson	Omnium
Silver medal – second place	2024 Carson	Team pursuit
Silver medal – second place	2025 Asunción	Madison
Bronze medal – third place	2019 Cochabamba	Team pursuit
Bronze medal – third place	2024 Carson	Madison
Bronze medal – third place	2025 Asunción	Team pursuit
Central American and Caribbean Games
Gold medal – first place	2010 Mayagüez	Individual pursuit
Gold medal – first place	2010 Mayagüez	Omnium
Gold medal – first place	2010 Mayagüez	Madison
Gold medal – first place	2010 Mayagüez	Team pursuit
Gold medal – first place	2014 Veracruz	Individual pursuit
Gold medal – first place	2014 Veracruz	Team pursuit
Gold medal – first place	2023 San Salvador	Team pursuit
Gold medal – first place	2026 Santo Domingo	Team pursuit
Silver medal – second place	2018 Barranquilla	Individual pursuit
Silver medal – second place	2018 Barranquilla	Madison
Silver medal – second place	2023 San Salvador	Omnium
Silver medal – second place	2023 San Salvador	Madison
Bronze medal – third place	2018 Barranquilla	Team pursuit
South American Games
Gold medal – first place	2010 Medellín	Individual pursuit
Gold medal – first place	2010 Medellín	Team pursuit
Gold medal – first place	2014 Santiago	Team pursuit
Gold medal – first place	2018 Cochabamba	Omnium
Silver medal – second place	2014 Santiago	Omnium
Silver medal – second place	2026 Santa Fe	Team pursuit
Bolivarian Games
Gold medal – first place	2009 Sucre	Individual pursuit
Gold medal – first place	2009 Sucre	Madison
Gold medal – first place	2009 Sucre	Team pursuit
Gold medal – first place	2013 Trujillo	Individual pursuit
Gold medal – first place	2013 Trujillo	Points race
Gold medal – first place	2013 Trujillo	Madison
Gold medal – first place	2013 Trujillo	Team pursuit
Gold medal – first place	2017 Santa Marta	Omnium
Gold medal – first place	2017 Santa Marta	Team pursuit
Gold medal – first place	2022 Valledupar	Omnium
Gold medal – first place	2022 Valledupar	Madison
Gold medal – first place	2022 Valledupar	Team pursuit
Gold medal – first place	2025 Lima-Ayacucho	Team pursuit
Silver medal – second place	2025 Lima-Ayacucho	Omnium
Silver medal – second place	2025 Lima-Ayacucho	Madison

Juan Esteban Arango Carvajal (born 9 October 1986) is a Colombian road and track cyclist.

At the 2012 Summer Olympics, he competed in the Men's team pursuit for the national team, and in the men's omnium.

== Major results ==
=== Road ===
2007
1st Road race, National Under-23 Road Championships
2010
6th Time trial, National Road Championships
2011
5th Road race, Pan American Games
2012
1st Stage 8 Vuelta Mexico Telmex
2015
1st Sprints classification Tour de San Luis
2017
1st Stage 3 Tour of Ankara
8th Winston-Salem Cycling Classic
2018
10th Road race, Central American and Caribbean Games

=== Track ===
2008
2008–09 UCI Track Cycling World Cup Classics, Cali

2nd Madison (with Carlos Urán)
3rd Team pursuit (with Arles Castro, Edwin Ávila and Alexander González)

3rd Scratch, 2007–08 UCI Track Cycling World Cup Classics, Copenhagen
2009
2009–10 UCI Track Cycling World Cup Classics, Cali

1st Team pursuit (with Edwin Ávila, Weimar Roldán and Arles Castro)
2nd Individual pursuit

2010
Central American and Caribbean Games

1st Individual pursuit
1st Omnium
1st Madison (with Weimar Roldán)
1st Team pursuit (with Edwin Ávila, Alex Castro and Weimar Roldán)

2nd Scratch, UCI Track Cycling World Championships
2010–11 UCI Track Cycling World Cup Classics, Cali

2nd Team pursuit (with Edwin Ávila, Weimar Roldán and Arles Castro)
2nd Omnium

2011
Pan American Games

1st Omnium
1st Team pursuit (with Edwin Ávila, Weimar Roldán and Arles Castro)

2011–12 UCI Track Cycling World Cup, Cali

1st Omnium
1st Madison (with Weimar Roldán)

2012
1st Omnium, 2011–12 UCI Track Cycling World Cup, London
1st Team pursuit, 2012–13 UCI Track Cycling World Cup, Cali (with Weimar Roldán, Arles Castro and Edwin Ávila)
2013
Bolivarian Games

1st Individual pursuit
1st Points race
1st Madison (with Fernando Gaviria)
1st Team pursuit (with Juan Sebastián Molano, Arles Castro and Jordan Parra)

2015
Marymoor Grand Prix

1st Keirin
1st Omnium
Track record, Men's Flying Lap (400m)

2017
Bolivarian Games

1st Omnium
1st Team pursuit
