= Cycling at the 2023 Pan American Games =

- Cycling pictograms
- Venue: Circuito BMX (BMX); Esplanade of Urban Sports (BMX freestyle); Morro Solar (mountain biking); Circuito San Miguel (road); Velódromo Peñalolén (track)
- Start date: October 21, 2023
- End date: November 5, 2023
- No. of events: 22 (11 men, 11 women)
- Competitors: 283 from 26 nations

Cycling competitions at the 2023 Pan American Games in Santiago, Chile will be held at five venues across Santiago. The BMX racing competitions will be held in the BMX Track in Peñalolén, while the Esplanade of urban sports will feature freestyle BMX events. San Cristobal Metropolitan Park will stage the mountain biking competitions, and the Streets of Isla de Maipo and Santiago will stage the road competitions. Finally the velodrome will stage the track cycling competitions.

22 medal events will contested, four in BMX, two in mountain biking and four in road cycling and 12 in track cycling. Each discipline is gender neutral in terms of events. A total of 250 cyclists qualified to compete at the games.

== Qualification ==
A total of 283 cyclists (142 men and 141 women) will qualify to compete. 187 will qualify in road/track, 36 in mountain biking and 60 in BMX. Various events and rankings were used to determine the qualifiers. A nation could enter a maximum of 34 athletes, four in mountain biking (two per gender), six in BMX (three per gender) 18 in track (nine per gender) and six in road (three per gender). Chile as host nation, was automatically awarded the maximum quota of 34 spots.

== Medal summary ==
=== Medal table ===
* Host nation (Chile)

Rank	NOC's	Gold	Silver	Bronze	Total
1	Colombia	6	4	4	14
2	Canada	5	1	1	7
3	United States	4	2	4	10
4	Mexico	3	5	2	10
5	Ecuador	1	2	0	3
6	Argentina	1	1	0	2
6	Trinidad and Tobago	1	1	0	2
8	Peru	1	0	0	1
9	Chile*	0	4	3	7
10	Cuba	0	1	0	1
10	Suriname	0	1	0	1
12	Brazil	0	0	3	3
13	Bermuda	0	0	1	1
13	Jamaica	0	0	1	1
13	Paraguay	0	0	1	1
13	Uruguay	0	0	1	1
13	Venezuela	0	0	1	1
Totals (17 entries)		22	22	22	66

=== Medalists ===
==== BMX ====
Event	Gold	Silver	Bronze
Men's racing	Kamren Larsen; United States	Cameron Wood; United States	Carlos Ramírez; Colombia
Women's racing	Mariana Pajón; Colombia	Molly Simpson; Canada	Gabriela Bolle; Colombia

==== BMX freestyle ====
Event	Gold	Silver	Bronze
Men's freestyle	José Torres; Argentina	José Manuel Cedano; Chile	Gustavo Oliveira; Brazil
Women's freestyle	Hannah Roberts; United States	Macarena Perez Grasset; Chile	Katherine Díaz; Venezuela

==== Mountain biking ====
Event	Gold	Silver	Bronze
Men's cross-country	Gunnar Holmgren; Canada	Martín Vidaurre; Chile	José Gabriel Marques; Brazil
Women's cross-country	Jennifer Jackson; Canada	Catalina Vidaurre; Chile	Raiza Goulão; Brazil

==== Road cycling ====
Event	Gold	Silver	Bronze
Men's road race	Jhonatan Narváez; Ecuador	Eduardo Sepúlveda; Argentina	Eric Fagúndez; Uruguay
Women's road race	Lauren Stephens; United States	Miryam Núñez; Ecuador	Agua Marina Espínola; Paraguay
Men's time trial	Walter Vargas; Colombia	Richard Carapaz; Ecuador	Conor White; Bermuda
Women's time trial	Kristen Faulkner; United States	Arlenis Sierra; Cuba	Aranza Villalón; Chile

==== Track cycling ====
Event	Gold	Silver	Bronze
Men's team pursuit	Canada; Carson Mattern; Chris Ernst; Michael Foley; Sean Richardson; Campbell Parrish	Colombia; Brayan Sánchez; Jordan Parra; Juan Esteban Arango; Nelson Soto	United States; Brendan Rhim; Colby Lange; David Domonoske; Grant Koontz; Anders Johnson
Women's team pursuit	Canada; Devaney Collier; Fiona Majendie; Kiara Lykyk; Ruby West	Mexico; Lizbeth Salazar; Antonieta Gaxiola; Victoria Velasco; Yareli Acevedo	Colombia; Andrea Alzate; Lina Hernández; Juliana Londoño; Lina Rojas
Men's individual sprint	Nicholas Paul; Trinidad and Tobago	Jaïr Tjon En Fa; Suriname	Kevin Quintero; Colombia
Women's individual sprint	Martha Bayona; Colombia	Yuli Verdugo; Mexico	Mandy Marquardt; United States
Men's team sprint	Canada; Tyler Rorke; Nick Wammes; James Hedgecock	Colombia; Carlos Echeverri; Rubén Murillo; Kevin Quintero	Mexico; Jafet López; Juan Ruiz Terán; Edgar Verdugo
Women's team sprint	Mexico; Jessica Salazar; Yuli Verdugo; Daniela Gaxiola	United States; Keely Ainslie; Kayla Hankins; Mandy Marquardt	Canada; Emy Savard; Sarah Orban; Jackie Boyle
Men's keirin	Kevin Quintero; Colombia	Nicholas Paul; Trinidad and Tobago	Juan Ruiz Terán; Mexico
Women's keirin	Martha Bayona; Colombia	Daniela Gaxiola; Mexico	Dahlia Palmer; Jamaica
Men's omnium	Hugo Ruiz; Peru	Ricardo Peña; Mexico	Jacob Decar; Chile
Women's omnium	Yareli Acevedo; Mexico	Lina Hernández; Colombia	Catalina Soto; Chile
Men's madison	Mexico; Fernando Nava; Ricardo Peña	Colombia; Jordan Parra; Juan Esteban Arango	United States; Colby Lange; Grant Koontz
Women's madison	Colombia; Lina Rojas; Lina Hernández	Mexico; Lizbeth Salazar; Antonieta Gaxiola	United States; Chloe Patrick; Colleen Gulick

== See also ==
- Cycling at the 2023 Parapan American Games
- Cycling at the 2024 Summer Olympics
