= Cycling at the 2023 Pan American Games – Men's team pursuit =

Men's team pursuit at the 2023 Pan American Games
- Venue: Velódromo Peñalolén
- Dates: 26–27 October
- Competitors: 26 from 6 nations
- Winning time: 3:53.593

Medalists
Gold medal	Chris Ernst; Michael Foley; Carson Mattern; Campbell Parrish; Sean Richardson	Canada
Silver medal	Juan Esteban Arango; Jordan Parra; Brayan Sánchez; Nelson Soto	Colombia
Bronze medal	David Domonoske; Anders Johnson; Grant Koontz; Colby Lange; Brendan Rhim	United States

The men's team pursuit competition of the cycling events at the 2023 Pan American Games was held on 26 and 27 October at the Velódromo Peñalolén in Santiago, Chile.

== Records ==
Prior to this competition, the existing world and Games records were as follows:

World record	Italy	3:42.032	Izu, Japan	4 August 2021
Games record	Colombia	3:59.236	Guadalajara, Mexico	17 October 2011

== Schedule ==
All times are local (UTC–3)

Date	Time	Round
26 October 2023	10:24	Qualification
26 October 2023	18:30	First round
27 October 2023	18:11	Finals

== Results ==
=== Qualification ===
All teams advanced to the first round.

Rank	Nation	Time	Behind	Notes
1	Canada; Carson Mattern; Chris Ernst; Michael Foley; Sean Richardson	3:55.981		GR
2	Colombia; Brayan Sánchez; Jordan Parra; Juan Esteban Arango; Nelson Soto	4:00.181	+4.200	
3	United States; Anders Johnson; Colby Lange; David Domonoske; Grant Koontz	4:01.589	+5.608	
4	Argentina; Tomás Moyano; Marcos Méndez; Rubén Ramos; Tomás Contte	4:08.908	+12.927	
5	Mexico; Edibaldo Maldonado; Sebastián Ruiz; Tomás Aguirre; Ulises Castillo	4:08.914	+12.933	
6	Chile; Héctor Quintana; José Rodríguez; Jacob Decar; Cristián Arriagada	4:15.247	+19.266	

=== First round ===
First round heats were held as follows:
Heat 1: 5th v 6th fastest
Heat 2: 2nd v 3rd fastest
Heat 3: 1st v 4th fastest

The winners of heats 2 and 3 proceeded to the gold medal race. The remaining four teams were ranked on time, from which the top two proceeded to the bronze medal race.

Heat	Rank	Nation	Time	Notes
1	1	Mexico; Edibaldo Maldonado; Sebastián Ruiz; Tomás Aguirre; Ulises Castillo	3:57.842	QB
1	2	Chile; Héctor Quintana; José Rodríguez; Jacob Decar; Cristián Arriagada	4:00.298	
2	1	Colombia; Brayan Sánchez; Jordan Parra; Juan Esteban Arango; Nelson Soto	3:57.990	QG
2	2	United States; Brendan Rhim; Colby Lange; David Domonoske; Grant Koontz	3:58.586	QB
3	1	Canada; Carson Mattern; Campbell Parrish; Michael Foley; Sean Richardson		QG
3	2	Argentina; Tomás Moyano; Marcos Méndez; Rubén Ramos; Tomás Contte	4:02.327	

=== Finals ===
Rank	Nation	Time	Behind	Notes
Gold medal final
1st place, gold medalist(s)	Canada; Carson Mattern; Sean Richardson; Michael Foley; Campbell Parrish	3:53.593		GR
2nd place, silver medalist(s)	Colombia; Brayan Sánchez; Jordan Parra; Juan Esteban Arango; Nelson Soto	4:02.310	+8.717	
Bronze medal final
3rd place, bronze medalist(s)	United States; Brendan Rhim; Colby Lange; Grant Koontz; David Domonoske	3:59.993		
4	Mexico; Edibaldo Maldonado; Sebastián Ruiz; Ulises Castillo; Tomás Aguirre	4:00.454	+0.461	
