= Olivia Cummins =

American cyclist

Personal information
- Born: August 6, 2003 (age 23) Colorado

Cycling career
- Sport: Cycling
- Disciplines: Track; Road
- Role: Rider
Medal record
Women's track cycling
Representing United States
Pan American Championships
Gold medal – first place	2024 Carson	Team pursuit
Gold medal – first place	2025 Asunción	Team pursuit
Gold medal – first place	2026 Santiago	Team pursuit
Silver medal – second place	2025 Asunción	Madison
Silver medal – second place	2026 Santiago	Madison
Bronze medal – third place	2022 Lima	Team pursuit
Bronze medal – third place	2024 Carson	Individual pursuit
Bronze medal – third place	2026 Santiago	Scratch

Olivia Cummins (born August 6, 2003) is an American track and road cyclist.

== Early life ==
From Fort Collins, Colorado, Cummins attends Colorado Mesa University. Cummins started road racing at five years of age. In 2017 she began racing on the track as well.

== Career ==
Cummins finished eighth at the 2021 UCI Junior Road World Championships.

In June 2022, Cummins finished second in the elite women's time trial at the USA Cycling Pro Road National Championships.

Cummins was selected to represent the US in the team pursuit and elimination race at the 2022 Pan American Track Cycling Championships in Lima, Peru. The team won the bronze medal at the games whilst Cummins finished fourth in the elimination race.

In August 2023, Cummins was part of the USA team pursuit team at the 2023 UCI Track Cycling World Championships in Glasgow.

In 2024, Olivia was selected to represent Team USA in the 2024 Paris Olympics for the Women's Team Pursuit. Team USA won Gold against New Zealand.
