= 2025 UCI Track Cycling World Championships – Men's points race =

Men's points race at the 2025 UCI Track Cycling World Championships
- Venue: Velódromo Peñalolén
- Location: Santiago, Chile
- Dates: 24 October
- Competitors: 24 from 24 nations
- Winning points: 56

Medalists
gold medal	Joshua Tarling	Great Britain
silver medal	Peter Moore	United States
bronze medal	Clément Petit	France

The Men's points race competition at the 2025 UCI Track Cycling World Championships was held on 24 October 2025.

== Results ==
The race was started at 17:00.

Rank	Name	Nation	Lap points	Sprint points	Total points
1st place, gold medalist(s)	Joshua Tarling	Great Britain	20	36	56
2nd place, silver medalist(s)	Peter Moore	United States	40	8	48
3rd place, bronze medalist(s)	Clément Petit	France	20	21	41
4	Naoki Kojima	Japan	20	20	40
5	Roger Kluge	Germany	20	18	38
6	Conor Leahy	Australia	20	13	33
7	Yoeri Havik	Netherlands	20	8	28
8	Jasper De Buyst	Belgium	20	7	27
9	Fernando Nava	Mexico	20	4	24
10	Tom Sexton	New Zealand	0	15	15
11	Elia Viviani	Italy	0	8	8
12	Xavier Cañellas	Spain	0	7	7
13	Bertold Drijver	Hungary	0	6	6
14	Tobias Hansen	Denmark	0	5	5
15	João Matias	Portugal	0	5	5
16	Mathias Guillemette	Canada	0	3	3
17	Maximilian Schmidbauer	Austria	0	2	2
18	Clever Martínez	Venezuela	0	1	1
19	Diego Rojas	Chile	0	0	0
20	Matyáš Koblížek	Czech Republic	0	0	0
21	Noah Bögli	Switzerland	0	0	0
22	Martin Chren	Slovakia	0	0	0
—	Akil Campbell	Trinidad and Tobago	Did not finish		
—	Wojciech Pszczolarski	Poland	Did not finish		
