= Carson Mattern =

Canadian cyclist (born 2004)

Personal information
- Born: February 24, 2004 (age 22) Ancaster, Ontario, Canada
- Height: 1.89 m (6 ft 2 in)

Cycling career
- Sport: Cycling
- Current team: NSN Development Team
- Disciplines: Track; Road
- Role: Rider

Amateur team
- 2022: Cannibal Team

Professional team
- 2023–: Israel Premier Tech Academy
Medal record
Representing Canada
Men's track cycling
Pan American Games
Gold medal – first place	2023 Santiago	Team pursuit
World Junior Championships
Gold medal – first place	2021 Cairo	Scratch
Gold medal – first place	2022 Tel Aviv	Individual pursuit
Gold medal – first place	2022 Tel Aviv	Omnium
Bronze medal – third place	2021 Cairo	Madison

Carson Mattern (born February 24, 2004) is a Canadian cyclist competing primarily in the track events. Mattern is a multiple time World Junior Champion.

== Career ==
=== Junior ===
At the age of 17, Mattern won the gold medal in the scratch race at the 2021 Cairo. Mattern would also team up with Dylan Bibic to win the bronze medal in the madison event at the 2021 World Juniors. The following year at the 2022 Junior Worlds in Tel Aviv, Israel, Mattern would win two more individual gold medals (in the individual pursuit and omnium events).

=== Senior ===
After his successes in the junior ranks, Mattern moved to the senior events in September 2022, where he would win the silver medal in the individual pursuit at the Canadian Championships.

In September 2023, Mattern was named to Canada's 2023 Pan American Games team. Mattern would go on to win the gold medal as part of the men's team pursuit. The team set a Pan American Games record by winning the gold medal. In July 2024, Mattern qualified to compete for Canada at the 2024 Summer Olympics in track cycling.

== Major results ==
=== Track ===
2021
UCI World Junior Championships

1st Scratch
3rd Madison (with Dylan Bibic)

2022
UCI World Junior Championships

1st Individual pursuit
1st Omnium

2023
1st Team pursuit, Pan American Games
National Junior Championships

1st Team sprint
1st Team pursuit

2024
1st Team pursuit, National Championships
National Junior Championships

1st Madison
1st Points race
1st Scratch
1st Elimination
1st Individual pursuit
1st Team pursuit
1st Kilometre
1st Sprint
1st Team sprint

=== Road ===
2021
4th Time trial, National Junior Championships
2022
National Junior Championships

2nd Time trial
3rd Road race

6th Overall Tour de Gironde
6th Overall Manavgat Side Junior
2024
4th Time trial, National Under-23 Championships
