= Peter Moore (cyclist) =

American track cyclist

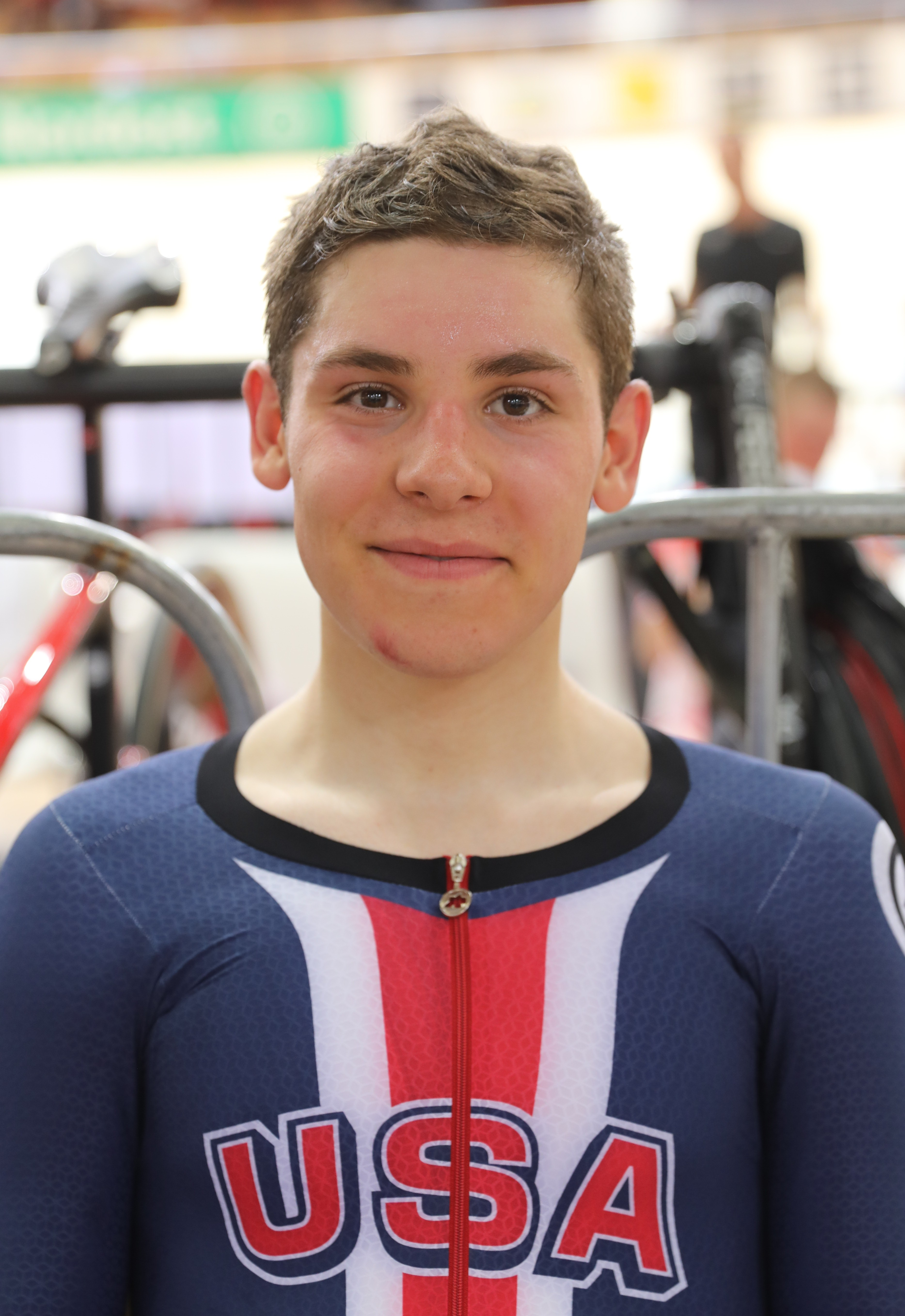
- Moore at the 2019 UCI Junior Track Cycling World Championships

Personal information
- Born: 24 July 2001 (age 25) Saint Paul, Minnesota

Cycling career
- Sport: Cycling
- Current team: GRC Jan Van Arckel
- Disciplines: Track; Road
- Role: Rider

Amateur teams
- 2021: AG2R Citroën U23 Team
- 2023–: GRC Jan Van Arckel
Medal record
Men's track cycling
Representing United States
World Championships
Silver medal – second place	2025 Santiago	Points race
Pan American Championships
Gold medal – first place	2024 Carson	Points race
Gold medal – first place	2024 Carson	Madison
Gold medal – first place	2024 Carson	Team pursuit
Gold medal – first place	2025 Asunción	Omnium
Gold medal – first place	2025 Asunción	Team pursuit

Peter Moore (born 24 July 2001) is an American track cyclist. He was a silver medalist at the 2025 UCI Track Cycling World Championships in the points race.

== Career ==
From St Paul, Minnesota, Moore was encouraged into cycling by his father and started racing with adults when he was just 11 years-old. attended St. Paul Academy and Summit School. In 2015, he won his age-group title at the Junior American National Cycling Championship. He also competed in cross country skiing before focusing fully on cycling, moving to Europe to race in 2021.

Moore won gold medals in the points race, and the madison alongside Grant Koontz, at the 2024 Pan American Track Cycling Championships. Moore placed fourth overall in the men's points race at the 2024 UCI Track Cycling World Championships in Ballerup, Denmark.

Moore retained his points race title the following year in Asunción, Paraguay at the 2025 Pan American Track Cycling Championships in April 2025.

Moore competed at the 2025 UCI Track Cycling World Championships in the men's points race in Santiago, Chile, winning the silver medal behind Josh Tarling of Great Britain.

== Major results ==
2018
1st Team pursuit, National Junior Championships
2019
1st Omnium, National Junior Championships
2023
2nd Six Days of Fiorenzuola (with Liam Walsh)
2024
Pan American Championships

1st Points race
1st Madison (with Grant Koontz)
1st Team pursuit

UCI Champions League

1st Elimination race, Apeldoorn II
1st Scratch, London I

2025
Pan American Championships

1st Omnium
1st Team pursuit

2nd Points race, UCI Track World Championships
8th Six Days of Rotterdam
