= Project Echelon Racing =

American cycling team

Team information
- UCI code: PEC
- Registered: United States
- Founded: 2017
- Discipline: Road
- Status: Club (2017–2022); UCI Continental (2023–)
- Website: Team home page

Key personnel
- General manager: Eric Hill
- Team managers: Isaiah Newkirk; John Hamblen

Team name history
- 2017–: Project Echelon Racing

Project Echelon Racing is an American UCI Continental cycling team established in 2017. It gained UCI Continental status in 2023, after competing as a club team in previous years.

== Team roster ==
As of February 7, 2024.

Rider	Date of birth
Richard Arnopol (USA)	May 10, 1992 (age 34)
Cade Bickmore (USA)	28 March 1998 (age 28)
Sam Boardman (USA)	September 8, 1995 (age 30)
Caleb Classen (USA)	September 19, 2001 (age 24)
Ethan Craine (NZL)	13 October 2001 (age 24)
Laurent Gervais (CAN)	November 3, 1997 (age 28)
Zach Gregg (USA)	14 March 1993 (age 33)

Rider	Date of birth
Colby Lange (USA)	March 30, 1999 (age 27)
Scott McGill (USA)	20 September 1998 (age 27)
Brendan Rhim (USA)	December 19, 1995 (age 30)
Hugo Scala Jr (USA)	December 29, 1997 (age 28)
Tyler Stites (USA)	March 18, 1998 (age 28)
Matt Zimmer (USA)	April 24, 1993 (age 33)

== Major results ==
2021
Stage 4 Joe Martin Stage Race, George Simpson
2022
Tour of the Gila

Stages 2 & 4, Tyler Stites
Stage 3 (ITT), George Simpson

2023
Overall Redlands Bicycle Classic

Stage 3, Tyler Stites

Overall Tucson Bicycle Classic

Prologue, Tyler Stites

Stage 1 Joe Martin Stage Race, Tyler Stites
Stage 4 Tour of the Gila, Cade Bickmore
2024
International Rhodes Grand Prix

1st, Tyler Stites
