= Brendan Rhim =

American cyclist

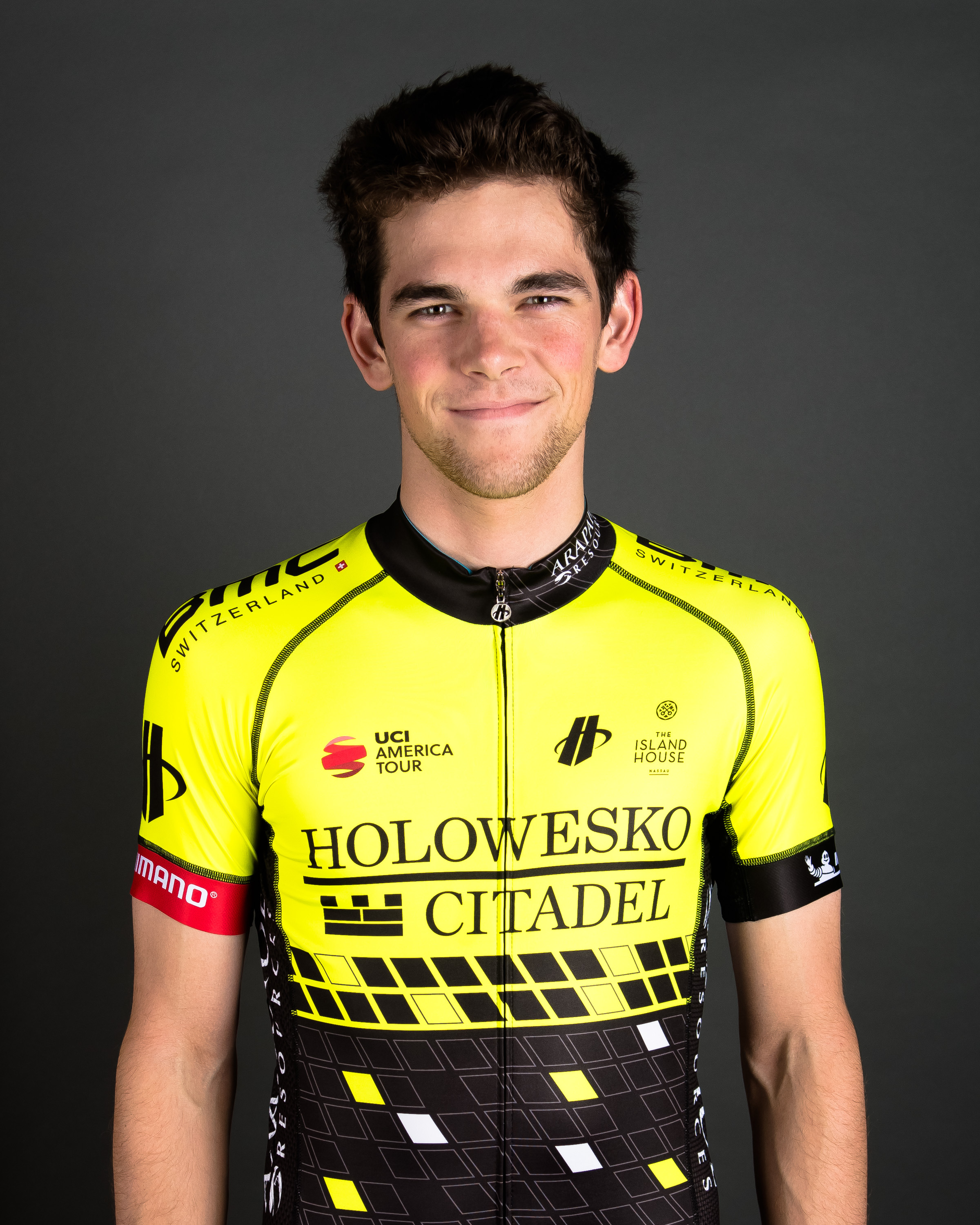
- Rhim in 2018

Personal information
- Full name: Brendan Rhim
- Born: December 19, 1995 (age 30)

Cycling career
- Sport: Cycling
- Current team: Project Echelon Racing
- Disciplines: Road; Track
- Role: Rider

Amateur teams
- 2009–2011: Claremont Cycle Depot Bike Club
- 2011–2013: Killington Mountain School Cycling Team
- 2014–2015: California Giant-Specialized
- 2023: American Cycling

Professional teams
- 2016–2020: Holowesko Citadel Racing Team
- 2021: EvoPro Racing
- 2022: Wildlife Generation Pro Cycling
- 2024–: Project Echelon Racing
Medal record
Men's track cycling
Representing United States
Pan American Games
Bronze medal – third place	2023 Santiago	Team pursuit
Pan American Championships
Gold medal – first place	2024 Carson	Team pursuit
Gold medal – first place	2025 Asunción	Elimination
Gold medal – first place	2025 Asunción	Madison
Gold medal – first place	2025 Asunción	Team pursuit
Gold medal – first place	2026 Santiago	Madison
Silver medal – second place	2025 Asunción	Scratch
Silver medal – second place	2026 Santiago	Team Pursuit

Brendan Rhim (born December 19, 1995) is an American cyclist, who currently rides for UCI Continental team Project Echelon Racing.

== Major results ==
=== Road ===
2013
1st Overall Tour de l'Abitibi
2014
6th Bucks County Classic
2015
1st Stage 4 Redlands Bicycle Classic
2017
3rd Road race, National Under-23 Road Championships
2018
1st Stage 4 Redlands Bicycle Classic
2nd Overall Joe Martin Stage Race

1st Stage 3 (ITT)

2nd Sunny King Criterium
6th Slag om Norg
2019
1st Overall Tour de Beauce

1st Points classification

1st Overall Green Mountain Stage Race

1st Stage 3

3rd Winston-Salem Cycling Classic
10th Chrono Kristin Armstrong
2022
1st Clarendon Cup
1st Louisville Criterium
3rd Overall Killington Stage Race

1st Stage 2

2023
1st Peachtree Corners Criterium
2024
1st Overall Tucson Bicycle Classic

1st Stages 1 & 3

Kreiz Breizh Elites

1st Points classification
1st Stage 1

Tour de Beauce

1st Points classification
1st Stage 4

1st Clarendon Cup
1st Stage 5 Redlands Bicycle Classic
2nd Criterium, National Championships

=== Track ===
2022
1st Team pursuit, National Championships
2023
National Championships

1st Madison (with Daniel Summerhill)
1st Team pursuit

3rd Team pursuit, Pan American Games
2024
1st Team pursuit, Pan American Championships
1st Omnium, National Championships
2025
Pan American Championships

1st Elimination race
1st Madison (with Peter Moore)
1st Team pursuit
2nd Scratch
