= Colby Lange =

American cyclist

Personal information
- Born: March 30, 1999 (age 27) Edwards, Colorado
- Height: 1.80 m (5 ft 11 in)
- Weight: 72 kg (159 lb)

Cycling career
- Sport: Cycling
- Current team: Project Echelon Racing
- Disciplines: Road; Track
- Role: Rider

Amateur teams
- 2017: LUX–Stradling–Specialized
- 2018: Texas Roadhouse CT

Professional teams
- 2019–2020: Wildlife Generation Pro Cycling p/b Maxxis
- 2021: Hagens Berman Axeon
- 2023–: Project Echelon Racing
Medal record
Men's track cycling
Representing United States
Pan American Games
Bronze medal – third place	2023 Santiago	Madison
Bronze medal – third place	2023 Santiago	Team pursuit
Pan American Championships
Gold medal – first place	2018 Aguascalientes	Team pursuit
Gold medal – first place	2026 Santiago	Madison
Silver medal – second place	2026 Santiago	Team Pursuit
Bronze medal – third place	2023 San Juan	Team pursuit
Bronze medal – third place	2023 San Juan	Points race

Colby Lange (born March 30, 1999) is an American road and track cyclist, who currently rides for UCI Continental team Project Echelon Racing.

== Major results ==
=== Track ===
2018
Pan American Championships

1st Team pursuit
2nd Individual pursuit

National Championships

2nd Points race
2nd Team pursuit

2019
National Championships

1st Team pursuit
2nd Scratch

2018–19 UCI World Cup

2nd Team pursuit, Hong Kong

2022
1st Madison (with Tristan Manderfeld), National Championships
2023
National Championships

1st Scratch
1st Points race
2nd Omnium
2nd Team pursuit

Pan American Games

3rd Madison (with Grant Koontz)
3rd Team pursuit

3rd Points race, Pan American Championships

=== Road ===
2017
1st National Junior Criterium Championships
2019
1st Boulder–Roubaix
2021
1st Bannock Street Crit
