= 2025 Pan American Track Cycling Championships =

- Venue: Asunción, Paraguay
- Date: 2–6 April
- Velodrome: National Olympic Velodrome
- Events: 22

The 2025 Pan American Track Cycling Championships took place at the National Olympic Velodrome in Asunción, Paraguay from 2 to 6 April 2025.

== Medal summary ==
=== Men ===
Event	Gold		Silver		Bronze	
Sprint	Nicholas Paul; Trinidad and Tobago		Kevin Quintero; Colombia		Cristian Ortega; Colombia	
Team sprint	Trinidad and Tobago; Ryan D'Abreau; Nicholas Paul; Njisane Phillip	43.428^{G}	Colombia; Rubén Murillo; Cristian Ortega; Kevin Quintero	43.712^{G}	Mexico; Jafet López; Ridley Malo; Edgar Verdugo	44.307^{B}
Team pursuit	United States; David Domonoske; Anders Johnson; Peter Moore; Brendan Rhim; Sean Christian	3:53.390^{G}	Canada; Cameron Fitzmaurice; Jonathan Hinse; Ethan Powell; Sean Richardson; Chris Ernst	3:56.979^{G}	Colombia; Juan Esteban Arango; Anderson Arboleda; Brayan Sánchez; Nelson Soto; Jordan Parra	caught opponent^{B}
Keirin	Kevin Quintero; Colombia		Nicholas Paul; Trinidad and Tobago		Nick Wammes; Canada	
Omnium	Peter Moore; United States	186 pts	Clever Martínez; Venezuela	158 pts	Rubén Ramos; Argentina	136 pts
Madison	United States; Peter Moore; Brendan Rhim	91 pts	Colombia; Juan Esteban Arango; Jordan Parra	70 pts	Argentina; Rubén Ramos; Marcos Méndez	57 pts
1 km time trial	Nicholas Paul; Trinidad and Tobago	59.729	Cristian Ortega; Colombia	1:00.372	James Hedgcock; Canada	1:00.798
Individual pursuit	Anders Johnson; United States	4:10.904^{G}	Anderson Arboleda; Colombia	4:18.949^{G}	Cameron Fitzmaurice; Canada	4:17.034^{B}
Points race	Hugo Ruiz; Peru	85 pts	Nelson Soto; Colombia	77 pts	Diego Rojas; Chile	75 pts
Scratch	Cameron Fitzmaurice; Canada		Brendan Rhim; United States		Clever Martínez; Venezuela	
Elimination race	Brendan Rhim; United States		Jordan Parra; Colombia		Jacob Decar; Chile	

=== Women ===
Event	Gold		Silver		Bronze	
Sprint	Lauriane Genest; Canada		Stefany Cuadrado; Colombia		Emily Hayes; United States	
Team sprint	United States; Kayla Hankins; Emily Hayes; Hayley Yoslov; McKenna McKee	48.250^{G}	Colombia; Stefany Cuadrado; Juliana Gaviria; Yarli Mosquera	48.814^{G}	Argentina; Valentina Luna; Natalia Vera; Valentina Méndez	50.292^{B}
Team pursuit	United States; Olivia Cummins; Emily Ehrlich; Bethany Ingram; Reagen Pattishall	4:19.525^{G}	Canada; Ariane Bonhomme; Skyler Goudswaard; Fiona Majendie; Lily Plante; Jenna Nestman	4:22.424^{G}	Colombia; Elizabeth Castaño; Lina Hernández; Lina Rojas; Camila Valbuena	4:29.661^{B}
Keirin	Lauriane Genest; Canada		Yuli Verdugo; Mexico		Stefany Cuadrado; Colombia	
Omnium	Yareli Acevedo; Mexico	158 pts	Lina Hernández; Colombia	139 pts	Bethany Ingram; United States	119 pts
Madison	Colombia; Elizabeth Castaño; Lina Hernández	49 pts	United States; Bethany Ingram; Olivia Cummins	42 pts	Canada; Lily Plante; Fiona Majendie	9 pts
1 km time trial	Stefany Cuadrado; Colombia	1:07.843	Hayley Yoslov; United States	1:08.518	Juliana Gaviria; Colombia	1:09.507
Individual pursuit	Emily Ehrlich; United States	4:40.473^{G}	Ariane Bonhomme; Canada	4:41.147^{G}	Skyler Goudswaard; Canada	caught opponent^{B}
Points race	Teniel Campbell; Trinidad and Tobago	41 pts	Sofía Arreola; Mexico	28 pts	Elizabeth Castaño; Colombia	25 pts
Scratch	Yareli Acevedo; Mexico		Marlies Mejías; Cuba		Elizabeth Castaño; Colombia	
Elimination race	Yareli Acevedo; Mexico		Scarlet Cortes; Chile		Teniel Campbell; Trinidad and Tobago	

== Medal table ==
Rank	Nation	Gold	Silver	Bronze	Total
1	United States	8	3	2	13
2	Trinidad and Tobago	4	1	1	6
3	Colombia	3	10	7	20
4	Canada	3	3	5	11
5	Mexico	3	2	1	6
6	Peru	1	0	0	1
7	Chile	0	1	2	3
8	Venezuela	0	1	1	2
9	Cuba	0	1	0	1
10	Argentina	0	0	3	3
Totals (10 entries)		22	22	22	66
