= Emily Ehrlich =

American cyclist (born 1993)

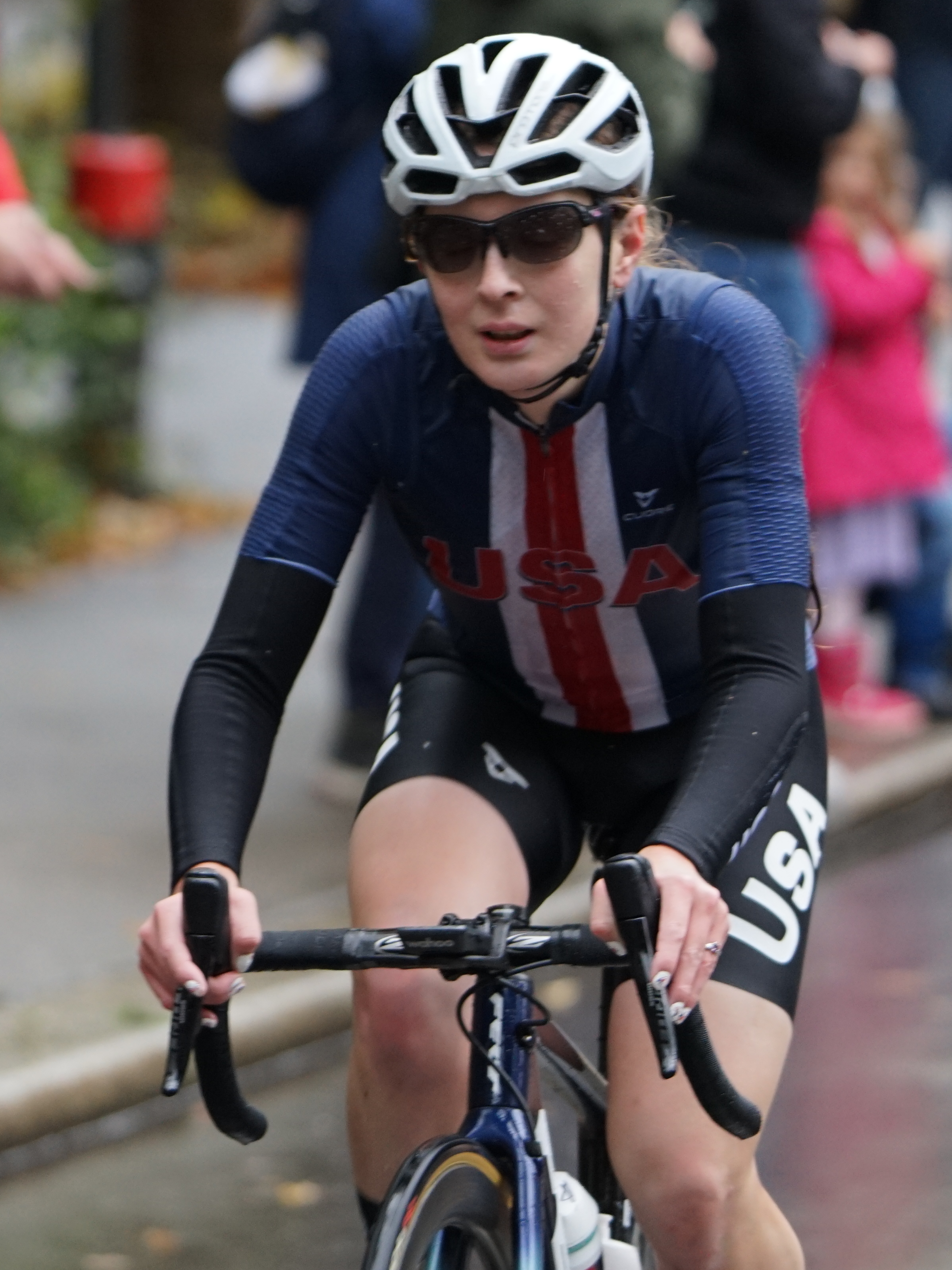
- Ehrlich riding in the 2024 UCI Road World Championships

Personal information
- Full name: Emily Ehrlich
- Born: December 25, 1993 (age 32) Dearborn, Michigan, U.S.

Cycling career
- Sport: Cycling
- Current team: Virginia's Blue Ridge–Twenty28
- Disciplines: Road; Track
- Role: Rider

Professional team
- 2023–: Virginia's Blue Ridge–Twenty24
Medal record
Representing United States
Women's track cycling
Pan American Championships
Gold medal – first place	2024 Carson	Individual pursuit
Gold medal – first place	2024 Carson	Team pursuit
Gold medal – first place	2025 Asunción	Individual pursuit
Gold medal – first place	2025 Asunción	Team pursuit
Gold medal – first place	2026 Santiago	Team pursuit
Silver medal – second place	2026 Santiago	Individual pursuit
Women's road cycling
Pan American Championships
Silver medal – second place	2025 Punta del Este	Time trial
Silver medal – second place	2026 Montería	Time trial

Emily Ehrlich (born December 25, 1993) is an American professional cyclist, who currently rides for Virginia's Blue Ridge–Twenty28. Ehrlich is a record four-time winner of the Valley of the Sun Stage Race. She is also vegan.

In 2025, Ehrlich won the United States National Time Trial Championships, beating Olympic champion Kristen Faulkner by 27 seconds.

== Major results ==
=== Road ===
2025
1st Time trial, National Championships
2nd Time trial, Pan American Championships
2nd Chrono Gatineau
10th Chrono des Nations
2026
2nd Time trial, Pan American Championships

=== Track ===
2024
Pan American Championships

1st Individual pursuit
1st Team pursuit

2025
Pan American Championships

1st Individual pursuit
1st Team pursuit
