= Cycling at the 2010 South American Games – Men's individual pursuit =

The Men's Individual Pursuit event at the 2010 South American Games was held on March 18. The qualification was held on the morning and the finals on the evening.

== Medalists ==
Gold	Silver	Bronze
Juan Esteban Arango; Colombia	Juan Pablo Suárez; Colombia	Marco Antonio Quinchel; Chile

== Results ==
=== Qualification ===
Rank	Rider	1000m	2000m	3000m	Final	Speed	Q
1	Juan Esteban Arango (COL)	1:08.995 (1)	2:15.022 (1)	3:22.338 (1)	4:30.222	53.289	QF
2	Juan Pablo Suárez (COL)	1:11.017 (4)	2:17.851 (3)	3:25.375 (2)	4:34.324	52.492	QF
3	Fernando Antogna (ARG)	1:12.854 (8)	2:20.051 (4)	3:26.777 (3)	4:36.958	51.993	QB
4	Marco Antonio Quinchel (CHI)	1:09.807 (2)	2:17.011 (2)	3:27.245 (4)	4:38.532	51.699	QB
5	Carlos Linares (VEN)	1:11.761 (5)	2:21.196 (6)	3:33.852 (6)	4:45.735	50.396	
6	Antonio Roberto Torres (CHI)	1:12.848 (7)	2:21.023 (5)	3:32.040 (5)	4:46.471	50.266	
7	Thiago Nardin (BRA)	1:10.971 (3)	2:21.563 (7)	3:35.744 (7)	4:50.642	49.545	
8	Marcos Novello (BRA)	1:12.657 (6)	2:24.661 (8)	3:38.402 (8)	4:52.259	49.271	

=== Finals ===
Rank	Rider	1000m	2000m	3000m	Final	Speed
1st place, gold medalist(s)	Juan Esteban Arango (COL)	1:10.905 (2)	2:17.629 (1)	3:24.969 (1)	4:33.634	52.625
2nd place, silver medalist(s)	Juan Pablo Suarez (COL)	1:10.711 (1)	2:20.471 (2)	3:30.596 (2)	4:42.234	51.021
3rd place, bronze medalist(s)	Marco Antonio Quinchel (CHI)	1:11.606 (2)	2:19.244 (2)	3:29.057 (1)	4:40.756	51.290
4	Fernando Antogna (ARG)	1:11.530 (1)	2:18.942 (1)	3:29.605 (2)	4:47.129	50.151
