= 2024 Pan American Track Cycling Championships =

- Venue: Carson, United States
- Date(s): 3–7 April
- Velodrome: Velo Sports Center
- Events: 22

The 2024 Pan American Track Cycling Championships took place at the Velo Sports Center in Carson, United States from 3 to 7 April 2024.

== Medal summary ==
=== Men ===
| Event | Gold | | Silver | | Bronze | |
|---|---|---|---|---|---|---|
| Sprint | Nicholas Paul; Trinidad and Tobago | | Cristian Ortega; Colombia | | Santiago Ramírez; Colombia | |
| Team sprint | Colombia; Rubén Murillo; Kevin Quintero; Santiago Ramírez; Cristian Ortega | 43.936^{G} | Canada; James Hedgcock; Tyler Rorke; Nick Wammes | 44.312^{G} | United States; Evan Boone; Joshua Hartman; Dalton Walters; Jamie Alvord | 44.658^{B} |
| Team pursuit | United States; David Domonoske; Anders Johnson; Grant Koontz; Brendan Rhim | 3:56.455^{G} | Colombia; Juan Esteban Arango; Bryan Gómez; Jordan Parra; Brayan Sánchez | 4:00.763^{G} | Canada; Chris Ernst; Cameron Fitzmaurice; Daniel Fraser-Maraun; Ethan Powell; Charles Bergeron | 3:59.845^{B} |
| Keirin | Nicholas Paul; Trinidad and Tobago | | Kevin Quintero; Colombia | | Kwesi Browne; Trinidad and Tobago | |
| Omnium | Chris Ernst; Canada | 131 pts | Juan Esteban Arango; Colombia | 115 pts | Ricardo Peña; Mexico | 114 pts |
| Madison | United States; Grant Koontz; Peter Moore | 79 pts | Mexico; Fernando Nava; Edibaldo Maldonado | 59 pts | Colombia; Juan Esteban Arango; Jordan Parra | 52 pts |
| 1 km time trial | Santiago Ramírez; Colombia | 1:00.796 | Cristian Ortega; Colombia | 1:00.835 | David Domonoske; United States | 1:02.689 |
| Individual pursuit | Anders Johnson; United States | 4:14.550^{G} | Chris Ernst; Canada | 4:15.347^{G} | Daniel Fraser-Maraun; Canada | 4:20.238^{B} |
| Points race | Peter Moore; United States | 50 pts | Bryan Gómez; Colombia | 33 pts | Franco Buchanan; Argentina | 33 pts |
| Scratch | Fernando Nava; Mexico | | Cristián Arriagada; Chile | | Akil Campbell; Trinidad and Tobago | |
| Elimination race | Grant Koontz; United States | | Jordan Parra; Colombia | | Jacob Decar; Chile | |

=== Women ===
| Event | Gold | | Silver | | Bronze | |
|---|---|---|---|---|---|---|
| Sprint | Daniela Gaxiola; Mexico | | Kelsey Mitchell; Canada | | Martha Bayona; Colombia | |
| Team sprint | Mexico; Daniela Gaxiola; Jessica Salazar; Yuli Verdugo | 47.529^{G} | Canada; Lauriane Genest; Kelsey Mitchell; Sarah Orban | 47.627^{G} | United States; Keely Ainslie; Kayla Hankins; Mandy Marquardt; Emily Hayes | 48.869^{B} |
| Team pursuit | United States; Olivia Cummins; Emily Ehrlich; Colleen Gulick; Bethany Ingram | 4:23.058^{G} | Canada; Ngaire Barraclough; Anika Brants; Kiara Lylyk; Lily Plante; Devaney Collier | 4:27.074^{G} | Mexico; Yareli Acevedo; Antonieta Gaxiola; Lizbeth Salazar; Victoria Velasco | 4:31.546^{B} |
| Keirin | Martha Bayona; Colombia | | Daniela Gaxiola; Mexico | | Kelsey Mitchell; Canada | |
| Omnium | Jennifer Valente; United States | 175 pts | Lina Hernández; Colombia | 138 pts | Yareli Acevedo; Mexico | 121 pts |
| Madison | United States; Megan Jastrab; Jennifer Valente | 51 pts | Colombia; Juliana Londoño; Lina Hernández | 32 pts | Canada; Lily Plante; Ngaire Barraclough | 29 pts |
| 500 m time trial | Martha Bayona; Colombia | 33.494 | Jessica Salazar; Mexico | 34.519 | Emily Hayes; United States | 34.923 |
| Individual pursuit | Emily Ehrlich; United States | 3:31.689^{G} | Aranza Villalón; Chile | 3:35.615^{G} | Olivia Cummins; United States | 3:34.891^{B} |
| Points race | Jennifer Valente; United States | 79 pts | Victoria Velasco; Mexico | 45 pts | Lily Plante; Canada | 8 pts |
| Scratch | Jennifer Valente; United States | | Lily Plante; Canada | | Amber Joseph; Barbados | |
| Elimination race | Jennifer Valente; United States | | Juliana Londoño; Colombia | | Yareli Acevedo; Mexico | |

== Medal table ==
* Host nation (United States)

| Rank | Nation | Gold | Silver | Bronze | Total |
|---|---|---|---|---|---|
| 1 | United States* | 12 | 0 | 5 | 17 |
| 2 | Colombia | 4 | 10 | 3 | 17 |
| 3 | Mexico | 3 | 4 | 4 | 11 |
| 4 | Trinidad and Tobago | 2 | 0 | 2 | 4 |
| 5 | Canada | 1 | 6 | 5 | 12 |
| 6 | Chile | 0 | 2 | 1 | 3 |
| 7 | Argentina | 0 | 0 | 1 | 1 |
| 7 | Barbados | 0 | 0 | 1 | 1 |
| Totals (8 entries) | | 22 | 22 | 22 | 66 |
