= Tyler Rorke =

Canadian track cyclist (born 2003)

Personal information
- Born: May 28, 2003 (age 23) Baden, Ontario, Canada

Cycling career
- Sport: Cycling
- Discipline: Track
- Role: Rider
- Rider type: Sprinter
Medal record
Men's track cycling
Representing Canada
Pan American Games
Gold medal – first place	2023 Santiago	Team sprint
Pan American Championships
Gold medal – first place	2023 San Juan	Team sprint
Gold medal – first place	2026 Santiago	Team sprint
Silver medal – second place	2022 Lima	Team sprint
Silver medal – second place	2024 Los Angeles	Team sprint

Tyler Rorke (born May 28, 2003) is a Canadian track cyclist competing in the sprint events. Rorke has won multiple medals in the team sprint event at the Pan American level.

== Career ==
Rorke made his senior team debut at the 2022 Commonwealth Games. At the 2023 Pan American Games, Rorke won gold in the team sprint event. Rorke has won three medals in the team sprint event at the Pan American Track Cycling Championships, gold in 2023, with silvers in 2022 and 2024.

In June 2024, Rorke was named to Canada's Olympic team. This will mark Rorke's first appearance at the Olympics.
