= David Domonoske =

American cyclist (born 1998)

Personal information
- Born: August 25, 1997 (age 29) Berkeley, California

Cycling career
- Sport: Cycling
- Current team: Alto Velo
- Disciplines: Road; Track
- Role: Rider

Amateur teams
- 2022: Alto Velo
- 2023: Ride Bikes Bro ECT
- 2024–: Alto Velo
Medal record
Men's track cycling
Representing United States
Pan American Games
Bronze medal – third place	2023 Santiago	Team pursuit
Pan American Championships
Gold medal – first place	2024 Carson	Team pursuit
Gold medal – first place	2025 Asunción	Team pursuit
Silver medal – second place	2026 Santiago	Team Pursuit
Bronze medal – third place	2023 San Juan	Team pursuit
Bronze medal – third place	2024 Carson	Kilometer

David Domonoske (born August 25, 1997) is an American professional racing cyclist, who specializes in track cycling. He is also a two time Pan American Champion as well as a Pan American Games bronze medalist, all in the team pursuit.

From Park City, UT, Domonoske originally competed in alpine skiing, particularly the slalom. He graduated from Dartmouth College with an engineering degree. During the COVID-19 pandemic, he took up mountain biking, before moving to track racing.

In March 2025 at the UCI Nations Cup, Domonoske, alongside Ashlin Barry, Anders Johnson and Graeme Frislie, set the American record in the team pursuit in a time of 3:47.503, beating the previous record by five seconds. The team finished second in the process.

== Major results ==
=== Track ===
2022
National Championships

1st Team pursuit
2nd Kilometer

2023
National Championships

1st Team pursuit
2nd Kilometer
2nd Elimination

3rd Team pursuit, Pan American Games
3rd Team pursuit, Pan American Championships
2024
Pan American Championships

1st Team pursuit
3rd Kilometer

2025
1st Team pursuit, Pan American Championships
1st Team pursuit, National Championships
2nd Team pursuit, UCI Nations Cup

=== Road ===
2022
1st Leesville Gap Road Race
1st West Crescent Criterium
2024
1st Land Park Criterium
1st Stage 3 Valley of the Sun Stage Race
