= Brayan Sánchez =

Colombian bicycle racer

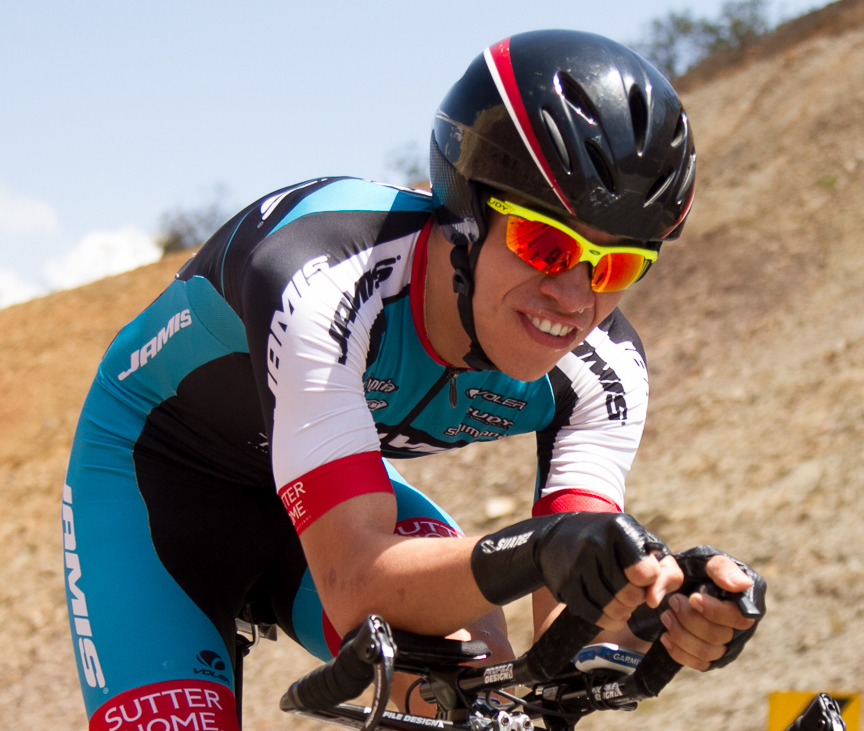
- Sánchez in 2016.

Personal information
- Full name: Brayan Sánchez Vergara
- Nickname: Naranjito
- Born: 3 June 1994 (age 32) Medellín, Colombia

Cycling career
- Sport: Cycling
- Current team: Team Medellín–EPM
- Disciplines: Road; Track
- Role: Rider

Amateur team
- 2013–2015: Aguardiente Antioqueño–Lotería de Medellín–IDEA

Professional teams
- 2016: Team Jamis
- 2017: EPM
- 2018: Holowesko Citadel p/b Arapahoe Resources
- 2019: Orgullo Paisa
- 2020–: Team Medellín
Medal record
Representing Colombia
Men's track cycling
Event	1st	2nd	3rd
Nations Cup stage	0	1	1
Pan American Games	0	2	1
Pan American Championships	4	6	3
CAC Games	2	1	1
South American Games	1	1	0
Bolivarian Games	2	2	0
Total	9	13	6
Pan American Games
Silver medal – second place	2019 Lima	Team pursuit
Silver medal – second place	2023 Santiago	Team pursuit
Bronze medal – third place	2019 Lima	Madison
Pan American Championships
Gold medal – first place	2014 Aguascalientes	Team pursuit
Gold medal – first place	2016 Aguascalientes	Team pursuit
Gold medal – first place	2021 Lima	Individual pursuit
Gold medal – first place	2021 Lima	Team pursuit
Silver medal – second place	2018 Aguascalientes	Team pursuit
Silver medal – second place	2019 Cochabamba	Individual pursuit
Silver medal – second place	2021 Lima	Madison
Silver medal – second place	2022 Lima	Individual pursuit
Silver medal – second place	2022 Lima	Team pursuit
Silver medal – second place	2024 Carson	Team pursuit
Bronze medal – third place	2019 Cochabamba	Points race
Bronze medal – third place	2019 Cochabamba	Team pursuit
Bronze medal – third place	2025 Asunción	Team pursuit
Central American and Caribbean Games
Gold medal – first place	2023 San Salvador	Team pursuit
Gold medal – first place	2026 Santo Domingo	Team pursuit
Silver medal – second place	2023 San Salvador	Madison
Bronze medal – third place	2026 Santo Domingo	Madison
South American Games
Gold medal – first place	2018 Cochabamba	Team pursuit
Silver medal – second place	2026 Santa Fe	Team pursuit
Bolivarian Games
Gold medal – first place	2017 Santa Marta	Team pursuit
Gold medal – first place	2025 Lima-Ayacucho	Team pursuit
Silver medal – second place	2017 Santa Marta	Individual pursuit
Silver medal – second place	2025 Lima-Ayacucho	Madison

Brayan Sánchez Vergara (born 3 June 1994) is a Colombian road and track cyclist, who currently rides for UCI Continental team Team Medellín–EPM. He won the gold medal at the 2016 Pan American Track Cycling Championships in the team pursuit.

== Major results ==
=== Road ===
2014
7th Overall Vuelta a Guatemala

1st Young rider classification

2016
6th Overall Joe Martin Stage Race
2018
10th Overall Joe Martin Stage Race
2019
1st Stage 6 Clásico RCN
1st Stage 3 (ITT) Vuelta a Colombia
2020
1st Stage 1 (TTT) Clásico RCN
2021
Vuelta a Colombia

1st Mountains classification
1st Stages 3 & 6 (ITT)

1st Stage 1 Tour du Rwanda
1st Stage 3 Clásica de Rionegro
2022
10th Overall Vuelta del Porvenir San Luis
2023
1st Stages 1 (TTT) & 5 Tour de Panamá
1st Stage 1 (TTT) Clásica de Rionegro
5th Overall Joe Martin Stage Race
2024
1st Stage 2 Vuelta al Ecuador
1st Stage 1 (TTT) Clásico RCN
5th Overall Tour of the Gila
2025
2nd Gran Premio New York City

2026
8th Time trial, CAC Games
