= Chris Ernst (cyclist) =

Canadian cyclist (born 1999)

Personal information
- Born: August 31, 1999 (age 27) Kitchener, Ontario, Canada
- Height: 187 cm (6 ft 2 in)

Cycling career
- Sport: Cycling
- Current team: Hustle Pro Cycling
- Disciplines: Track; Road
- Role: Rider
- Rider type: Cast Iron

Amateur teams
- 2016–2017: Kallisto FCV
- 2018: Team RaceClean
- 2019: Hewdog Racing

Professional teams
- 2020: DC Bank/Probaclac
- 2021–2022: XSpeed United Continental
- 2023–: Toronto Hustle
Medal record
Men's track cycling
Representing Canada
Pan American Games
Gold medal – first place	2023 Santiago	Team pursuit
Pan American Championships
Gold medal – first place	2022 Lima	Individual pursuit
Gold medal – first place	2022 Lima	Team pursuit
Gold medal – first place	2023 San Juan	Individual pursuit
Gold medal – first place	2023 San Juan	Team pursuit
Gold medal – first place	2024 Carson	Omnium
Gold medal – first place	2026 Santiago	Team Pursuit
Silver medal – second place	2024 Carson	Individual pursuit
Silver medal – second place	2025 Asunción	Team pursuit
Bronze medal – third place	2024 Carson	Team pursuit
Bronze medal – third place	2026 Santiago	Individual pursuit

Chris Ernst (born August 31, 1999) is a Canadian racing cyclist, who currently rides for UCI Continental team Hustle Pro Cycling.

== Major results ==
=== Track ===
2016
1st Team pursuit, National Junior Championships
2017
2nd Team pursuit, National Championships
2019
1st Team pursuit, National Championships (with Aidan Caves, Jay Lamoureux & Michael Foley)
2020
3rd Team pursuit, Milton, 2019–20 UCI World Cup
2021
2nd Team pursuit, Cali, UCI Nations Cup
2022
Pan American Championships

1st Individual pursuit
1st Team pursuit (with Evan Burtnik, Michael Foley & Sean Richardson)
2nd Points race

2023
Pan American Championships

1st Team pursuit (with Dylan Bibic, Mathias Guillemette, Michael Foley & Sean Richardson)
2nd Individual pursuit

=== Road ===
2017
3rd Time trial, National Junior Championships
2022
4th Time trial, National Championships
