= Anders Johnson (cyclist) =

American cyclist (born 1998)

Personal information
- Born: February 26, 1998 (age 28) Huntsville, Utah

Cycling career
- Sport: Cycling
- Disciplines: Road; Track
- Role: Rider

Amateur teams
- 2021: Voler Factory Team
- 2024: Empyr Cycling
Medal record
Men's track cycling
Representing United States
World Championships
Bronze medal – third place	2025 Santiago	Individual pursuit
Pan American Games
Bronze medal – third place	2023 Santiago	Team pursuit
Pan American Championships
Gold medal – first place	2024 Carson	Individual pursuit
Gold medal – first place	2024 Carson	Team pursuit
Gold medal – first place	2025 Asunción	Individual pursuit
Gold medal – first place	2025 Asunción	Team pursuit
Bronze medal – third place	2023 San Juan	Individual pursuit
Bronze medal – third place	2023 San Juan	Team pursuit

Anders Johnson (born February 26, 1998) is an American professional racing cyclist, who specializes in track cycling. He won a bronze medal in the individual pursuit at the 2025 UCI Track Cycling World Championships. He is also a multiple time Pan American Champion as well as a Pan American Games bronze medalist.

From Huntsville, Utah, a small town in the Ogden Valley, Johnson graduated from California Polytechnic State University and currently resides in San Luis Obispo, California.

In March 2025 at the UCI Nations Cup, Johnson, alongside Ashlin Barry, Graeme Frislie and David Domonoske, set the American record in the team pursuit in a time of 3:47.503, beating the previous record by five seconds. The team finished second in the process.

== Major results ==
=== Track ===
2022
1st Team pursuit, National Championships
2023
National Championships

1st Omnium
1st Individual pursuit
1st Team pursuit
2nd Points race

3rd Team pursuit, Pan American Games
Pan American Championships

3rd Individual pursuit
3rd Team pursuit

2024
Pan American Championships

1st Individual pursuit
1st Team pursuit

National Championships

1st Points race
1st Scratch
1st Individual pursuit
1st Team pursuit

2025
Pan American Championships

1st Individual pursuit
1st Team pursuit

National Championships

1st Individual pursuit
1st Team pursuit

2nd Team pursuit, UCI Nations Cup, Konya
3rd Individual pursuit, UCI World Championships

=== Road ===
2025
2nd Time trial, National Championships
