= Cristian Ortega =

Colombian track cyclist (born 2000)

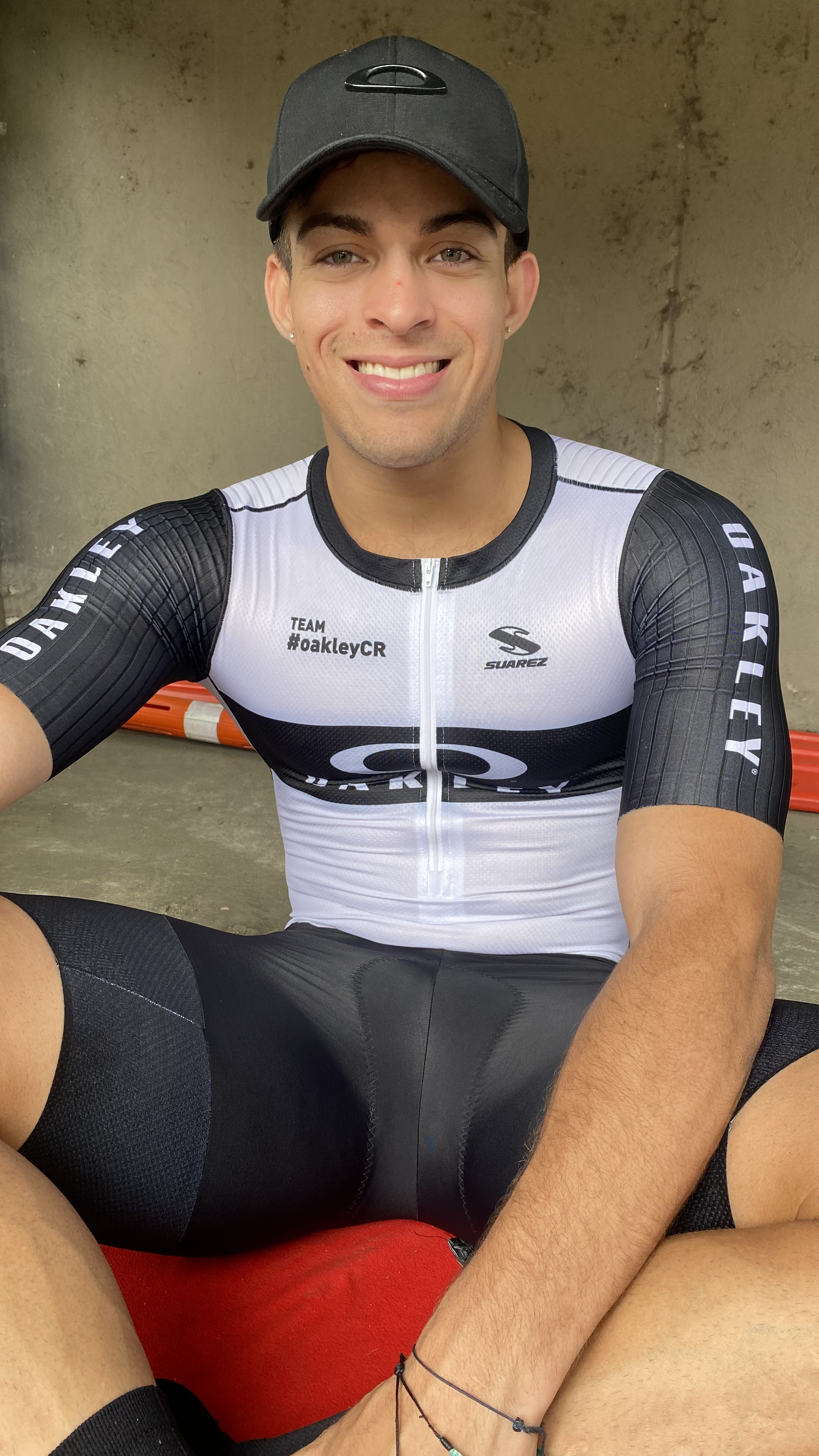
- Ortega in 2022

Personal information
- Full name: Cristian David Ortega Fontalvo
- Nickname: Cris
- Born: 29 September 2000 (age 26) Barranquilla, Colombia
- Height: 5 ft 9 in (175 cm)

Cycling career
- Sport: Cycling
- Current team: Team Colombia
- Discipline: Track
- Role: Rider
- Rider type: Sprinter
Medal record
Representing Colombia
Men's track cycling
Event	1st	2nd	3rd
Nations Cup	0	1	1
Nations Cup stage	1	1	0
Champions League	0	0	1
Champions League stage	1	2	0
Pan American Championships	2	7	2
CAC Games	0	4	1
South American Games	2	1	0
Bolivarian Games	2	2	0
Junior Pan American Games	3	0	0
Total	11	18	5
Nations Cup
Silver medal – second place	2022	Team sprint
Bronze medal – third place	2022	1 km time trial
Champions League
Bronze medal – third place	2024	Sprint
Pan American Championships
Gold medal – first place	2024 Carson	Team sprint
Gold medal – first place	2026 Santiago	1 km time trial
Silver medal – second place	2022 Lima	1 km time trial
Silver medal – second place	2024 Carson	Sprint
Silver medal – second place	2024 Carson	1 km time trial
Silver medal – second place	2025 Asunción	1 km time trial
Silver medal – second place	2025 Asunción	Team sprint
Silver medal – second place	2026 Santiago	Sprint
Silver medal – second place	2026 Santiago	Team sprint
Bronze medal – third place	2023 San Juan	Team sprint
Bronze medal – third place	2025 Asunción	Sprint
Central American and Caribbean Games
Silver medal – second place	2023 San Salvador	Team sprint
Silver medal – second place	2026 Santo Domingo	Keirin
Silver medal – second place	2026 Santo Domingo	Sprint
Silver medal – second place	2026 Santo Domingo	Team sprint
Bronze medal – third place	2023 San Salvador	Keirin
South American Games
Gold medal – first place	2026 Santa Fe	Keirin
Gold medal – first place	2026 Santa Fe	Team sprint
Silver medal – second place	2026 Santa Fe	Sprint
Bolivarian Games
Gold medal – first place	2022 Valledupar	Team sprint
Gold medal – first place	2025 Lima-Ayacucho	Team sprint
Silver medal – second place	2025 Lima-Ayacucho	Keirin
Silver medal – second place	2025 Lima-Ayacucho	Sprint
Junior Pan American Games
Gold medal – first place	2021 Cali-Valle	Keirin
Gold medal – first place	2021 Cali-Valle	Sprint
Gold medal – first place	2021 Cali-Valle	Team sprint

Cristian David Ortega Fontalvo (born 29 September 2000) is a Colombian track cyclist, who specializes in sprinting events. He competed in the 2022 UCI Track Cycling World Championships.

== Major results ==
2021
Junior Pan American Games

1st Keirin
1st Sprint
1st Team sprint

National Championships

2nd Keirin
2nd Team sprint
3rd Kilometer
3rd Sprint

2022
UCI Nations Cup

1st Kilometer, Glasgow
2nd Team sprint, Cali

Pan American Championships

2nd Kilometer

Bolivarian Games

1st Team sprint

National Championships

2nd Kilometer
2nd Sprint
2nd Team sprint

2023
Pan American Championships

3rd Team sprint

Central American and Caribbean Games

2nd Team sprint
3rd Keirin

2024
Pan American Championships

1st Team sprint
2nd Kilometer
2nd Sprint

Champions League

1st Keirin, Apeldoorn I
2nd Keirin, Apeldoorn II
2nd Keirin, London I

2025
Pan American Championships

2nd Kilometer
2nd Team sprint
3rd Sprint

Bolivarian Games

1st Team sprint
2nd Keirin
2nd Sprint

2026
Pan American Championships

1st Kilometer
2nd Sprint
2nd Team sprint

Central American and Caribbean Games

2nd Keirin
2nd Sprint
2nd Team sprint

South American Games

1st Keirin
1st Team sprint
2nd Sprint
