= Nick Wammes =

Canadian track cyclist

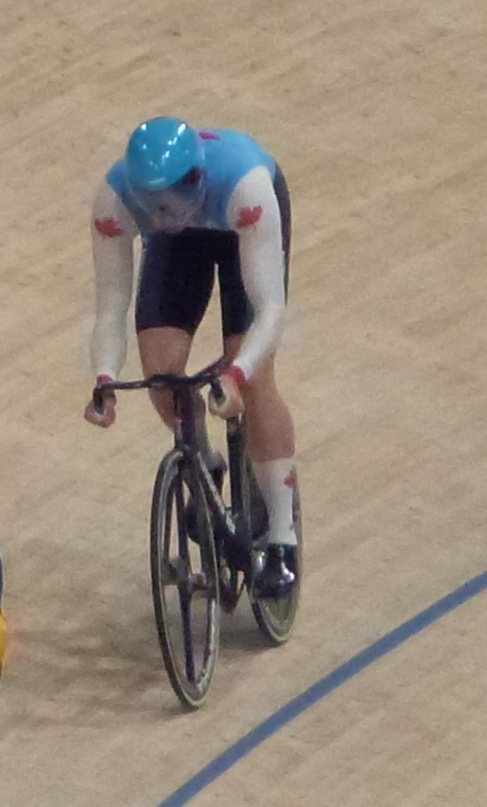
- Wammes in 2024

Personal information
- Born: October 21, 1999 (age 26) London, Ontario, Canada

Cycling career
- Sport: Cycling
- Discipline: Track
- Role: Rider
- Rider type: Sprinter
Medal record
Representing Canada
Men's track cycling
Pan American Games
Gold medal – first place	2023 Santiago	Team Sprint
Pan American Championships
Gold medal – first place	2023 San Juan	Team sprint
Silver medal – second place	2022 Lima	Team sprint
Silver medal – second place	2024 Carson	Team sprint
Bronze medal – third place	2025 Asunción	Keirin
Bronze medal – third place	2026 Santiago	Sprint
Bronze medal – third place	2026 Santiago	Keirin

Nick Wammes (born October 21, 1999) is a Canadian track cyclist competing in the sprint events.

== Career ==
At the 2019 Pan American Games in Lima, Peru, Wammes finished in ninth place in the individual sprint event.

In July 2020, Wammes was named to Canada's 2020 Olympic team in the individual sprint and keirin events. In June 2024, Wammes was named to his second Olympic team.

== Personal ==
Wammes was born in London, Ontario and lists Bothwell, Ontario as his hometown.
