= 2026 Pan American Track Cycling Championships =

- Venue: Santiago, Chile
- Date: 16–22 February 2026
- Velodrome: Peñalolén Velodrome
- Nations participating: 20
- Cyclists participating: 168
- Events: 22

The 2026 Pan American Track Cycling Championships took place at the Peñalolén Velodrome in Santiago, Chile from 16 to 22 February 2026. A total of 168 athletes from 20 nations participated.

== Participating nations ==
- Argentina
- Barbados
- Bermuda
- Brazil
- Canada
- Chile (Host)
- Colombia
- Cuba
- Dominican Republic
- Ecuador
- Grenada
- Guatemala
- Jamaica
- Mexico
- Paraguay
- Peru
- Trinidad and Tobago
- United States
- Uruguay
- Venezuela

== Medal summary ==
=== Men ===
Event	Gold		Silver		Bronze	
Sprint	Nicholas Paul; Trinidad and Tobago		Cristian Ortega; Colombia		Nick Wammes; Canada	
Team sprint	Canada; Cole Dempster; Tyler Rorke; James Hedgcock	43.372^{G}	Colombia; Rubén Murillo; Kevin Quintero; Santiago Ramírez; Cristian Ortega	43.445^{G}	Trinidad and Tobago; Zion Pulido; Nicholas Paul; Kwesi Browne	44.028^{B}
Team pursuit	Canada; Cameron Fitzmaurice; Jonathan Hinse; Campbell Parrish; Chris Ernst	3:50.456^{G}	United States; David Domonoske; Grant Koontz; Colby Lange; Brendan Rhim; Cade Bickmore	3:53.972^{G}	Chile; Luciano Carrizo; Jacob Decar; Martín Mancilla; Diego Rojas; Ignacio Manbrán	3:51.467^{B}
Keirin	Nicholas Paul; Trinidad and Tobago		Kevin Quintero; Colombia		Nick Wammes; Canada	
Omnium	Tomás Moyano; Argentina	167 pts	Gabriel Séguin; Canada	162 pts	Ricardo Peña; Mexico	159 pts
Madison	United States; Brendan Rhim; Colby Lange	100 pts	Canada; Jonathan Hinse; Gabriel Séguin	53 pts	Argentina; Rubén Ramos; Tomás Moyano	52 pts
1 km time trial	Cristian Ortega; Colombia	1:00.240	Dalton Walters; United States	1:00.330	James Hedgcock; Canada	1:00.577
Individual pursuit	Sebastián Ruiz; Mexico	4:11.631^{G}	Cameron Fitzmaurice; Canada	4:17.912^{G}	Chris Ernst; Canada	4:11.668^{B}
Points race	Fernando Nava; Mexico	68 pts	Franco Buchanan; Argentina	62 pts	Arlex Méndez; Venezuela	52 pts
Scratch	Conor White; Bermuda		Grant Koontz; United States		Akil Campbell; Trinidad and Tobago	
Elimination race	Jordan Parra; Colombia		Clever Martínez; Venezuela		Akil Campbell; Trinidad and Tobago	

=== Women ===
Event	Gold		Silver		Bronze	
Sprint	Lauriane Genest; Canada		Stefany Cuadrado; Colombia		Hayley Yoslov; United States	
Team sprint	Mexico; María José Vizcaino; Yuli Verdugo; Daniela Gaxiola	47.162^{G}	Colombia; Juliana Gaviria; Marianis Salazar; Stefany Cuadrado	48.456^{G}	United States; Emily Hayes; Hayley Yoslov; McKenna McKee	48.176^{B}
Team pursuit	United States; Olivia Cummins; Emily Ehrlich; Bethany Ingram; Kristen Faulkner; Emma Jimenez Palos	4:17.682^{G}	Mexico; Yareli Acevedo; Sofía Arreola; María Fernanda Figueroa; Anet Barrera; Antonieta Gaxiola	OVL^{G}	Canada; Kimberly Chen; Jenna Nestman; Lily Plante; Justine Thomas	4:29.500^{B}
Keirin	Lauriane Genest; Canada		Stefany Cuadrado; Colombia		McKenna McKee; United States	
Omnium	Yareli Acevedo; Mexico	148 pts	Maribel Aguirre; Argentina	131 pts	Elizabeth Castaño; Colombia	125 pts
Madison	Mexico; Yareli Acevedo; Sofía Arreola	53 pts	United States; Olivia Cummins; Emma Jimenez Palos	37 pts	Colombia; Elizabeth Castaño; Luciana Osorio	32 pts
1 km time trial	Stefany Cuadrado; Colombia	1:05.743	Daniela Gaxiola; Mexico	1:06.245	Hayley Yoslov; United States	1:06.866
Individual pursuit	Kristen Faulkner; United States	caught opponent^{G}	Emily Ehrlich; United States	OVL^{G}	María Fernanda Figueroa; Mexico	caught opponent^{B}
Points race	Anna Hicks; United States	66 pts	Yareli Acevedo; Mexico	49 pts	Marlies Mejías; Cuba	44 pts
Scratch	Teniel Campbell; Trinidad and Tobago		Marlies Mejías; Cuba		Olivia Cummins; United States	
Elimination race	Yareli Acevedo; Mexico		Marlies Mejías; Cuba		Scarlet Cortés; Chile	

== Medal table ==
* Host nation (Chile)

Rank	Nation	Gold	Silver	Bronze	Total
1	Mexico	6	3	2	11
2	United States	4	5	5	14
3	Canada	4	3	5	12
4	Colombia	3	6	2	11
5	Trinidad and Tobago	3	0	3	6
6	Argentina	1	2	1	4
7	Bermuda	1	0	0	1
8	Cuba	0	2	1	3
9	Venezuela	0	1	1	2
10	Chile*	0	0	2	2
Totals (10 entries)		22	22	22	66
