= Antonieta Gaxiola =

Mexican cyclist (born 1997)

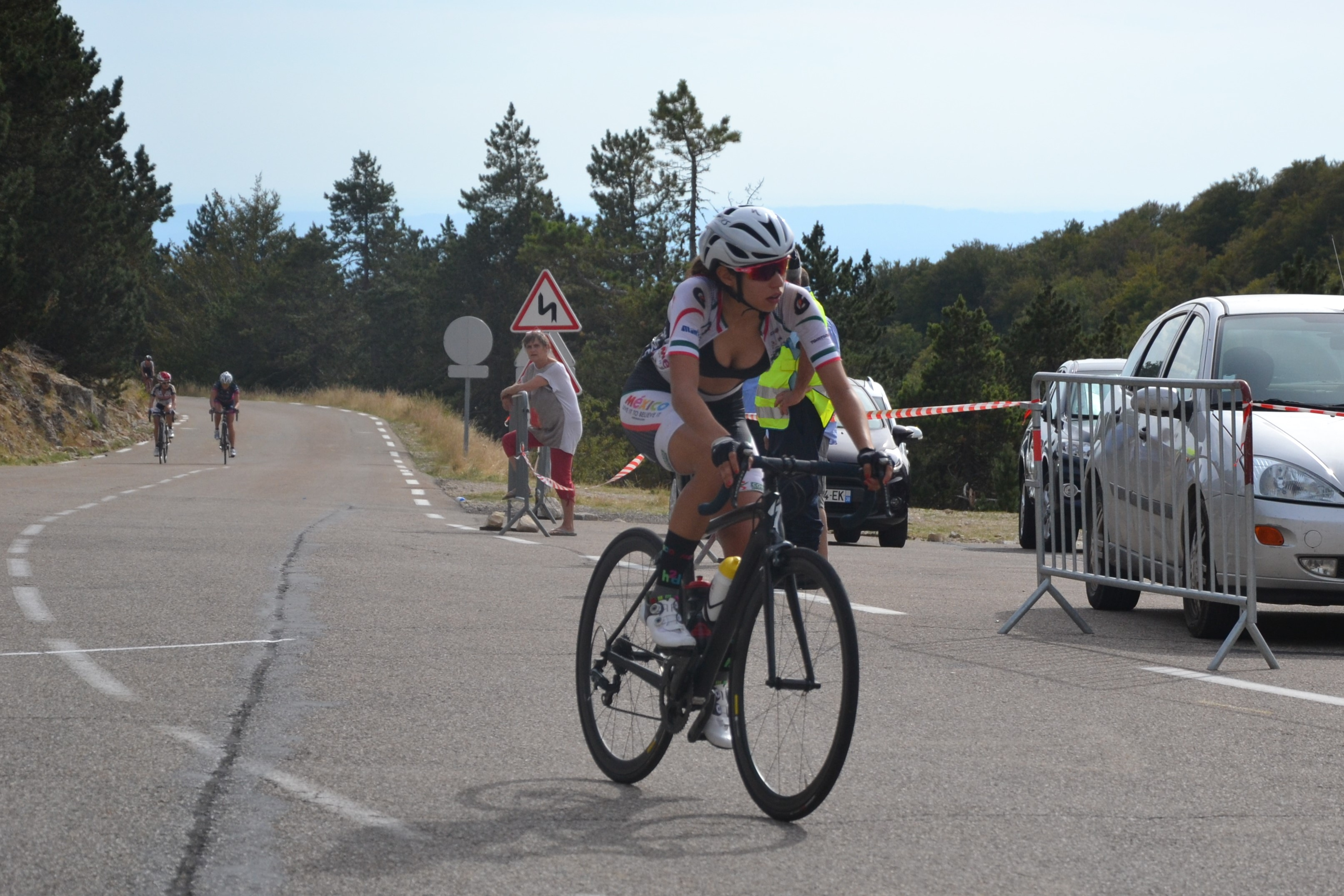
- Gaxiola at the 2016 Tour Féminin International de l'Ardèche

Personal information
- Born: 20 May 1997 (age 29)

Cycling career
- Sport: Cycling
- Role: Rider
Medal record
Women's track cycling
Representing Mexico
Pan American Games
Silver medal – second place	2023 Santiago	Team pursuit
Silver medal – second place	2023 Santiago	Madison
Pan American Championships
Gold medal – first place	2023 San Juan	Madison
Gold medal – first place	2023 San Juan	Scratch race
Silver medal – second place	2022 Lima	Team pursuit
Silver medal – second place	2023 San Juan	Team pursuit
Silver medal – second place	2026 Santiago	Team pursuit
Bronze medal – third place	2019 Cochabamba	Team pursuit
Bronze medal – third place	2024 Carson	Team pursuit
Central American and Caribbean Games
Silver medal – second place	2026 Santo Domingo	Team pursuit

María Antonieta Gaxiola González (born 20 May 1997) is a Mexican racing cyclist. In September 2020, she won the Mexican National Road Race Championships.
