= Jordan Parra =

Colombian bicycle racer (born 1994)

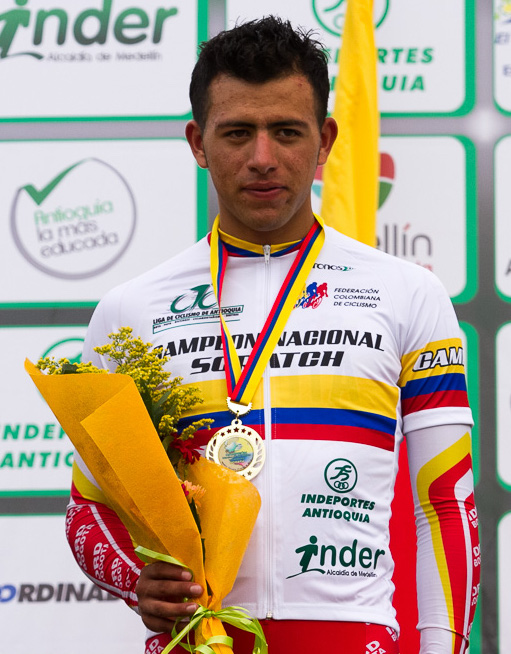
- Parra in 2013.

Personal information
- Full name: Jordan Arley Parra Arias
- Born: 19 April 1994 (age 32) Bogotá, Colombia
- Height: 1.69 m (5 ft 7 in)
- Weight: 67 kg (148 lb)

Cycling career
- Sport: Cycling
- Current team: Soñando Colombia
- Disciplines: Road cycling; Track cycling
- Role: Rider
- Rider type: Sprinter

Amateur teams
- 2016: Mundial de Tornillos
- 2021–: Soñando Colombia

Professional teams
- 2015: GM Cycling Team
- 2017: EPM
- 2018–2019: Team Manzana Postobón
Medal record
Representing Colombia
Men's track cycling
| Event | 1st | 2nd | 3rd |
|---|---|---|---|
| World Junior Championships | 1 | 1 | 0 |
| Nations Cup | 0 | 1 | 0 |
| Nations Cup stage | 1 | 1 | 4 |
| Pan American Games | 0 | 3 | 0 |
| Pan American Championships | 4 | 10 | 4 |
| CAC Games | 2 | 0 | 2 |
| South American Games | 0 | 1 | 0 |
| Bolivarian Games | 4 | 0 | 0 |
| Total | 12 | 17 | 10 |
Nations Cup
| Silver medal – second place | 2021 | Team pursuit |
Pan American Games
| Silver medal – second place | 2019 Lima | Team pursuit |
| Silver medal – second place | 2023 Santiago | Madison |
| Silver medal – second place | 2023 Santiago | Team pursuit |
Pan American Championships
| Gold medal – first place | 2015 Santiago | Team pursuit |
| Gold medal – first place | 2021 Lima | Elimination |
| Gold medal – first place | 2021 Lima | Team pursuit |
| Gold medal – first place | 2026 Santiago | Elimination |
| Silver medal – second place | 2013 Mexico City | Team pursuit |
| Silver medal – second place | 2014 Aguascalientes | Madison |
| Silver medal – second place | 2016 Aguascalientes | Madison |
| Silver medal – second place | 2022 Lima | Elimination |
| Silver medal – second place | 2022 Lima | Madison |
| Silver medal – second place | 2022 Lima | Team pursuit |
| Silver medal – second place | 2024 Carson | Elimination |
| Silver medal – second place | 2024 Carson | Team pursuit |
| Silver medal – second place | 2025 Asunción | Elimination |
| Silver medal – second place | 2025 Asunción | Madison |
| Bronze medal – third place | 2017 Couva | Madison |
| Bronze medal – third place | 2022 Lima | Points race |
| Bronze medal – third place | 2024 Carson | Madison |
| Bronze medal – third place | 2025 Asunción | Team pursuit |
Central American and Caribbean Games
| Gold medal – first place | 2014 Veracruz | Team pursuit |
| Gold medal – first place | 2026 Santo Domingo | Team pursuit |
| Bronze medal – third place | 2014 Veracruz | Scratch |
| Bronze medal – third place | 2026 Santo Domingo | Madison |
South American Games
| Silver medal – second place | 2026 Santa Fe | Team pursuit |
Bolivarian Games
| Gold medal – first place | 2013 Trujillo | Scratch |
| Gold medal – first place | 2013 Trujillo | Team pursuit |
| Gold medal – first place | 2022 Valledupar | Madison |
| Gold medal – first place | 2022 Valledupar | Team pursuit |
World Junior Championships
| Gold medal – first place | 2012 Invercargill | Madison |
| Silver medal – second place | 2012 Invercargill | Scratch |

Jordan Arley Parra Arias (born 19 April 1994) is a Colombian road and track cyclist, who currently rides for Colombian amateur team Soñando Colombia. He competed in the scratch event at the 2014 UCI Track Cycling World Championships.

== Major results ==
2015
6th GP Adria Mobil
2018
1st Stage 6 Tour of Taihu Lake
2019
9th Grand Prix de la Somme
