= Grant Koontz =

American cyclist (born 1994)

Personal information
- Born: January 28, 1994 (age 32) Houston, Texas

Cycling career
- Sport: Cycling
- Disciplines: Road; Track
- Role: Rider

Amateur teams
- 2012–2013: Southern Elite
- 2014–2015: Super Squadra–AustinBikes
- 2015: Bissell–ABG–Giant
- 2016–2017: Team Arapahoe Resources
- 2019: Support Clean Sport–Sea Sucker–Guttenplan
- 2019: DNA Racing
- 2019: Marc Pro CT

Professional team
- 2018: Holowesko Citadel p/b Arapahoe Resources
Medal record
Men's track cycling
Representing United States
Pan American Games
Bronze medal – third place	2023 Santiago	Team pursuit
Bronze medal – third place	2023 Santiago	Madison
Pan American Championships
Gold medal – first place	2022 Lima	Scratch race
Gold medal – first place	2024 Carson	Elimination race
Gold medal – first place	2024 Carson	Team pursuit
Gold medal – first place	2024 Carson	Madison
Silver medal – second place	2026 Santiago	Team Pursuit
Silver medal – second place	2026 Santiago	Scratch race
Bronze medal – third place	2023 San Juan	Team pursuit
Bronze medal – third place	2023 San Juan	Scratch race

Grant Koontz (/ˈkuːnts/ KOONTS; born January 28, 1994) is an American road and track cyclist.

== Major results ==
=== Track ===
2019
1st Team pursuit, National Championships
2021
1st Team pursuit, National Championships
2022
1st Scratch race, Pan American Championships
National Championships

1st Scratch
1st Points race
1st Omnium

2023
Pan American Games

3rd Madison (with Colby Lange)
3rd Team pursuit

Pan American Championships

3rd Scratch
3rd Team pursuit

2024
Pan American Championships

1st Team pursuit
1st Elimination race
1st Madison

2025
National Championships

1st Individual pursuit
1st Points race
1st Team pursuit

=== Road ===
2017
2nd Overall Hotter'N Hell Hundred

1st Stage 3

2019
1st Points classification, Joe Martin Stage Race
2025
1st Louisville Criterium
