= McKenna McKee =

American track cyclist (b. 2003)

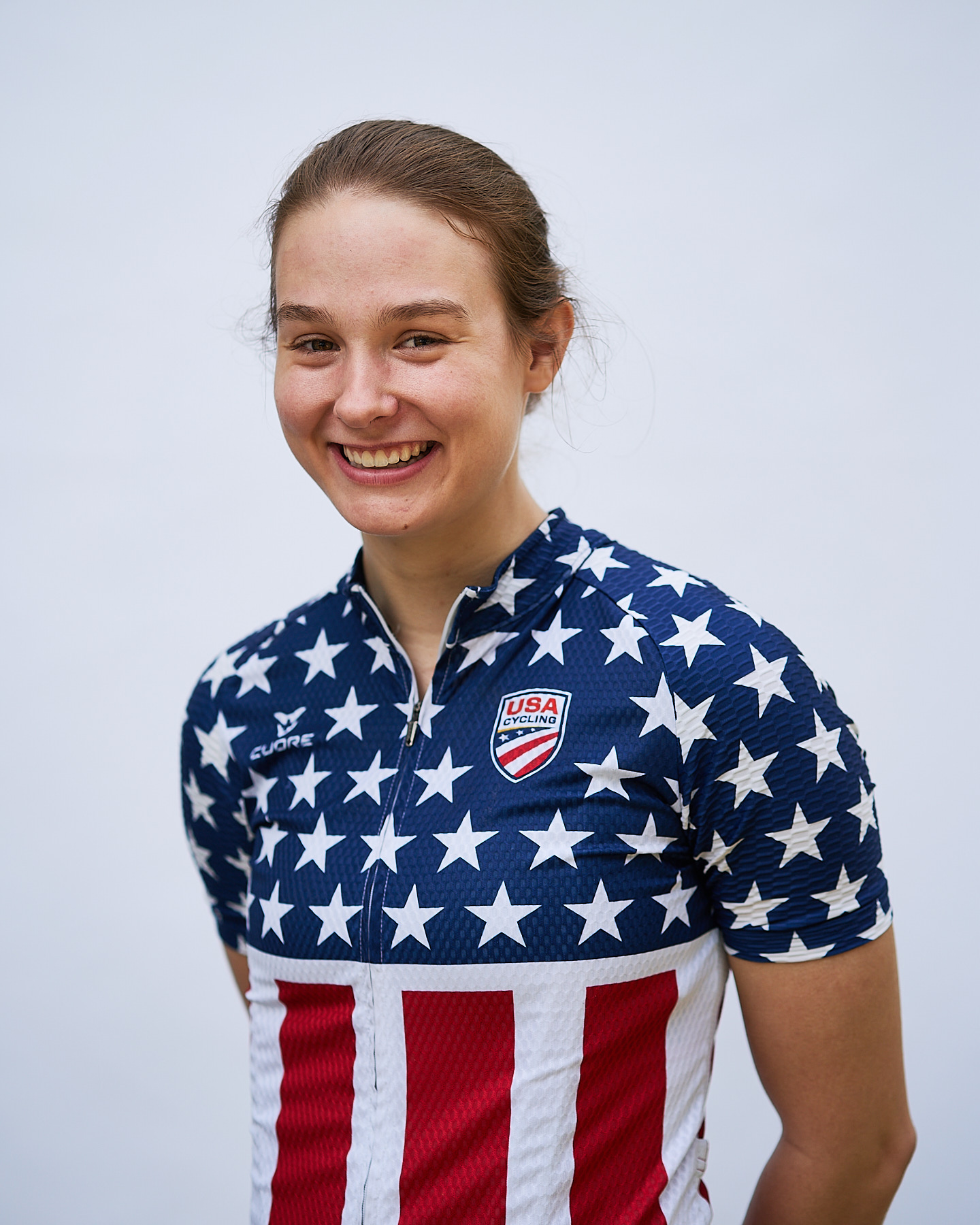
- McKenna McKee in May 2025 (Photographer: Scott Rounds)

Personal information
- National team: USA Cycling
- Citizenship: USA
- Born: October 25, 2003 (age 23) Portland, Oregon
- Height: 5 ft 8 in (173 cm)
- Website: https://www.mckenna.bike/

Sport
- Country: USA Cycling – Track

Achievements and titles
- Regional finals: 2026 (double Bronze) and 2025 (Gold) UCI Elite Track Pan American Track Championships; 2025 UCI C1 Track Cycling Challenge, Grenchen, Switzerland

McKenna McKee (born October 25, 2003) is an American female sprint track cyclist, who is an eighteen-time USA Cycling national champion, a Pan American Track Championships gold medalist, a two-time national record holder, and a part of the national team representing the USA at the UCI Track Cycling World Championships (2022–2025).

From September, 2024 through December, 2025, McKenna raced with Tesseract Racing Team (a UCI licensed, Cycling Canada trade team). Beginning Jan 1, 2026, she transferred to the US-based, UCI Star Track Cycling team.

In early 2025, McKenna was selected by the USA Cycling Track Team to represent the USA at the Pan American Track Cycling Championships, in Asuncion, Paraguay, April 2-6. She won the Gold as a member of the Elite Women Team sprint.

Now in her fourth consecutive year training as part of the national team, McKenna is pursuing her goal to qualify for the USA Olympic Cycling Team in 2028, in Los Angeles, CA.

== Biography ==
McKenna McKee was born in 2003, in Portland, Oregon. At age two, McKenna showed a strong interest in riding bikes, even before she was walking. Her cycling parents encouraged her interest, and by age three, she was completely self-sufficient in riding on her own. On September 28, 2010, at age 6, McKenna was diagnosed with type 1 diabetes.

In spite of the medical and psychological challenges facing athletes with type1 diabetes, McKenna was determined to continue her cycling, and entered her first cyclo-cross bike race at age 7 in 2011. She soon thereafter discovered the now defunct Alpenrose Velodrome, in Portland. Over the next 12 years, McKenna competed in many racing disciplines, including cyclocross, and some collegiate criteriums. At age 15, McKenna was selected to attend the Team Novo Nordisk talent ID camp, where she spent 5 days doing road training. In 2020, she officially joined the Novo Nordisk racing team composed of T1D athletes. Finally settling on track racing at national and world-class levels, she has been racing track ever since.

In addition to her time training and racing, and advocating for T1D children and their families, McKenna is pursuing her education and her future career goal of becoming a pediatric nurse. She is currently enrolled in nursing studies at Lower Columbia College.

== Racing results ==
DATE	DISCIPLINE	EVENT	CATEGORY	RESULTS	Ref
2015 Jan 10	Cyclocross	USAC Cyclocross National Championships Austin, TX	Jr Women 10–12	5th	
2017 Jul 31- Aug 6	Track	USAC Elite and Junior National Track Championships LA Velo Sports Center, Carson, CA	Jr Women 13–14 Omnium (500m TT, 4th; 2K Pursuit, 4th; Pts Race, 4th)	Gold	
2017 Jan 7	Cyclocross	USAC Cyclocross National Championships Hartford, CT	Jr Women 13–14	Bronze	
2018 Jul 7–11	Track	USAC Track National Championships Valley Preferred Cycling Center (T-Town) Breinigsville, PA	Jr Women 15–18, 500m TT	Bronze	
2019 May 17–18	Track	2019 Jr National Track Cup #3 Alkek Velodrome Houston, TX	Jr Women 15–18 Keirin Jr Women 15–18 Team Sprint Jr Women 15–18 Sprints	Gold Silver Silver	
2019 Jul 2–3	Track	USAC Jr & Elite Track National Championships LA Velo Sports Center Carson, CA	Jr Women 15–18 Sprints Jr Women 15–18 Team Sprint Jr Women 15–18 Keirin	Silver Silver Bronze	
2019 Jul 20	Track	Vision Grand Prix Jerry Baker Memorial Velodrome Marymoor Park Redmond, WA	Elite Women Team Sprint Elite Women Keirin	Gold Bronze	
2021 Jul 15–18	Track	USAC Jr, Elite & Para National Track Championships Valley Preferred Cycling (T-Town) Breinigsville, PA	Elite Women Team Sprint (Natl Record) Jr 15–18 Women Team Sprint (Natl Record) Jr 15–18 Women Sprints Women 15–18 Keirin	Gold Gold Silver Silver	
2023 Jul 5–9	Track	USAC Jr, Elite, and Para Track National Championships LA Velo Sports Center Carson, CA	Elite Women Sprints U23 Women Sprints Elite Women Team Sprint U23 Women Team Sprint Elite Women 500m TT Elite Women Keirin	Gold Gold Gold Gold Silver Silver	
2024 Jun 7	Track	Friday Nights Under the Lights Valley Preferred Velo Center (T-Town) Breinigsville, PA	Elite Women Keirin	Gold	
2024 Jul 11–13	Track	USA Cycling Elite & Para-Cycling Track National Championships LA Velo Sports Center Carson, CA	Elite Women Sprints U23 Women Sprints Elite Women Keirin U23 Women Keirin Elite Women Team Sprint Elite Women 500m TT	Gold Gold Gold Gold Silver Bronze	
2024 Jul 19	Track	Marymoor Grand Prix Jerry Baker Memorial Velodrome Marymoor Park Redmond, WA	Elite Women Sprints	Gold	
2024 Sep 6–8	Track	UCI C2 Coupe de France Fenioux Piste Velodrome Georges Preveral Lyon, France	Elite Women Sprints Elite Women Keirin	Gold Bronze	
2024 Sep 13–15	Track	UCI C2 Ciclisme En Pista – XI Memorial Miquel Poblet Velodrome D’Horta Barcelona, Spain	Elite Women Keirin Final	5th	
2025 Jan 7–8	Track	UCI C2 Bromont Le Centre National de Cyclisme Bromont, Canada	Elite Women Keirin Final Elite Women Sprints	Silver Silver	
2025 Apr 2–6	Track	Pan American Track Cycling Championships, Asuncion, Paraguay	Elite Women Team Sprint	Gold	
2025 Jun 7–27	Track	Festival of Speed UCI C2 Elite Valley Preferred Velo Center (T-Town) Breinigsville, PA	Elite Women Keirin Elite Women Sprints	Gold Silver	
2025 Jul 9–23	Track	LA Velo Sports Center Summer Slam UCI C2 Carson, CA	Jul 9: Elite Women Keirin Final Jul 23: Elite Women Keirin Final	Silver Gold	
2025 Aug 21–24	Track	USA Cycling Elite Track National Championships Olympic Training Center Velodrome Colorado Springs, Colorado	Elite Women Keirin U23 Women Keirin Elite Women Sprints U23 Women Sprints Elite Women Team Sprint	Gold Gold Silver Gold Silver	
2025 Oct 22–26	Track	UCI Track Cycling World Championships Peñalolén Velodrome Santiago, Chile	Elite Women Kierin	Reached Round One repechage, placed 3rd	
2025 Dec 12–14	Track	UCI C1 Track Cycling Challenge Tissot Velodrome Grenchen, Switzerland	Elite Women Keirin	4th place finals	
2026 Feb 18-22	Track	Pan American Track Cycling Championships, Peñalolén Velodrome Santiago, Chile	Elite Women Team Sprint Elite Women Keirin	Bronze Bronze	
2026 Apr 17-19	Track	UCI Track World Cup Hong Kong, China	Elite Women Team Sprint Elite Women Keirin	8th 26th	
2026 April 24-26	Track	UCI Track World Cup Nilai, Malaysia	Elite Women Team Sprint Elite Women's Keirin	5th 15th	
2026 May 8-10	Track	UCI C1 Grand Prix Framar Prague, Czech Republic	Elite Women Sprints Elite Women Keirin	Gold Gold	
2026 May 20	Track	Bahnen-Tournee Silbernen Eulen von Ludwigshafen Germany	Elite Women Keirin	13th	
2026 May 21	Track	Bahnen-Tournee Oschelbronn Germany	Elite Women Sprint	Gold	
2026 May 22	Track	Bahnen-Tournee Oberhausen-Rheinhausen Germany	Elite Women Keirin	Gold	
2026 May 23-24	Track	Bahnen-Tournee Darmstadt Germany	Elite Women Keirin Elite Women Sprint	Bronze Silver	
2026 May 25	Track	Bahnen-Tournee Dudenhofen Germany	Elite Women Sprint	Silver	
2026 June 26	Track	LA Velo Sports Center Summer Slam 26 Carson, CA	Elite Women Keirin	5th	
2026 Aug 20-23	Track	USA Cycling Elite Track National Championships LA Velo Sports Center Carson, CA	Elite Women Sprint Elite Women Keirin Elite Women Team Sprint	Gold Gold Silver	
2026 Oct 14-18	Track	Tissot UCI Track World Championships Shanghai, China	Women Team Sprint Final Standings Women Keirin Final Standings	10th 23rd	
