= 2023 Pan American Track Cycling Championships =

- Venue: San Juan, Argentina
- Date: 14–18 June
- Velodrome: Vicente Alejo Chancay Velodrome
- Events: 22

The 2023 Pan American Track Cycling Championships took place at the Vicente Alejo Chancay Velodrome in San Juan, Argentina from 14 to 18 June 2023.

== Medal summary ==
=== Men ===
Event	Gold	Silver	Bronze
Sprint	Nicholas Paul; Trinidad and Tobago	Kevin Quintero; Colombia	Jaïr Tjon En Fa; Suriname
Team sprint	Canada; James Hedgcock; Tyler Rorke; Nick Wammes	Trinidad and Tobago; Quincy Alexander; Kwesi Browne; Zion Pulido; Nicholas Paul	Colombia; Cristian Ortega; Rubén Murillo; Kevin Quintero; Juan Ochoa
Team pursuit	Canada; Dylan Bibic; Michael Foley; Mathias Guillemette; Sean Richardson; Chris Ernst	Colombia; Anderson Arboleda; Fernando Gaviria; Juan Esteban Arango; Juan Pablo Zapata	United States; Anders Johnson; Grant Koontz; Gavin Hoover; David Domonoske; Colby Lange
Keirin	Nicholas Paul; Trinidad and Tobago	Jaïr Tjon En Fa; Suriname	James Hedgcock; Canada
Omnium	Dylan Bibic; Canada	Fernando Gaviria; Colombia	Akil Campbell; Trinidad and Tobago
Madison	Canada; Dylan Bibic; Mathias Guillemette	Colombia; Juan Esteban Arango; Fernando Gaviria	Mexico; Ricardo Peña; Fernando Nava
1 km time trial	James Hedgcock; Canada	Santiago Ramírez; Colombia	Juan Ruiz; Mexico
Individual pursuit	Chris Ernst; Canada	Michael Foley; Canada	Anders Johnson; United States
Points race	Juan Esteban Arango; Colombia	Mathias Guillemette; Canada	Colby Lange; United States
Scratch	Dylan Bibic; Canada	Fernando Nava; Mexico	Grant Koontz; United States
Elimination race	Dylan Bibic; Canada	Fernando Gaviria; Colombia	Jacob Decar; Chile

=== Women ===
Event	Gold	Silver	Bronze
Sprint	Lauriane Genest; Canada	Daniela Gaxiola; Mexico	Yuli Verdugo; Mexico
Team sprint	Mexico; Jessica Salazar; Yuli Verdugo; Daniela Gaxiola; María Vizcaíno	Canada; Jackie Boyle; Lauriane Genest; Sarah Orban	United States; Keely Ainslie; Kayla Hankins; Mandy Marquardt; McKenna McKee
Team pursuit	Canada; Erin Attwell; Ariane Bonhomme; Fiona Majendie; Ruby West; Devaney Collier	Mexico; Sofía Arreola; María Gaxiola; Victoria Velasco; Lizbeth Salazar; Yareli Acevedo	United States; Colleen Gulick; Elizabeth Stevenson; Bethany Matsic; Danielle Morshead
Keirin	Martha Bayona; Colombia	Lauriane Genest; Canada	Luz Gaxiola; Mexico
Omnium	Victoria Velasco; Mexico	Alexi Ramirez; Trinidad and Tobago	Lina Rojas; Colombia
Madison	Mexico; María Gaxiola; Lizbeth Salazar	Canada; Ariane Bonhomme; Devaney Collier	Colombia; Lina Rojas; Elizabeth Castaño
500 m time trial	Martha Bayona; Colombia	Mandy Marquardt; United States	Jessica Salazar; Mexico
Individual pursuit	Ariane Bonhomme; Canada	Fiona Majendie; Canada	Andrea Alzate; Colombia
Points race	Yareli Acevedo; Mexico	Elizabeth Castaño; Colombia	Paula Villalón; Chile
Scratch	María Gaxiola; Mexico	Wellyda Rodrigues; Brazil	Colleen Gulick; United States
Elimination race	Yareli Acevedo; Mexico	Elizabeth Castaño; Colombia	Devaney Collier; Canada

== Medal table ==
Rank	Nation	Gold	Silver	Bronze	Total
1	Canada	11	6	2	19
2	Mexico	6	3	5	14
3	Colombia	3	8	4	15
4	Trinidad and Tobago	2	2	1	5
5	United States	0	1	7	8
6	Suriname	0	1	1	2
7	Brazil	0	1	0	1
8	Chile	0	0	2	2
Totals (8 entries)		22	22	22	66
