= Trinidad and Tobago at the 2022 Commonwealth Games =

- Flag of Trinidad and Tobago
- CG code: TTO
- CGA: Trinidad and Tobago Olympic Committee
- Website: ttoc.org

in Birmingham, England 28 July 2022 – 8 August 2022
- Competitors: 69 (38 men and 31 women) in 12 sports
- Flag bearers: Jereem Richards; Michelle-Lee Ahye
- Medals Ranked 15th: Gold 3 Silver 2 Bronze 1 Total 6

Commonwealth Games appearances (overview)
- 1934; 1938; 1950; 1954; 1958; 1962; 1966; 1970; 1974; 1978; 1982; 1986; 1990; 1994; 1998; 2002; 2006; 2010; 2014; 2018; 2022; 2026; 2030

Trinidad and Tobago competed at the 2022 Commonwealth Games at Birmingham, England from 28 July to 8 August 2022. It was the team's 19th appearance at the Games.

Jereem Richards and Michelle-Lee Ahye were the country's flagbearers during the opening ceremony.

== Medalists ==
Medal	Name	Sport	Event	Date
Gold	Nicholas Paul	Cycling	Men's keirin	30 July
Gold	Jereem Richards	Athletics	Men's 200 m	6 August
Gold	Dwight St. Hillaire; Asa Guevara; Machel Cedenio; Jereem Richards; Che Lara; Kashief King	Athletics	Men's 4 × 400 m relay	7 August
Silver	Nicholas Paul	Cycling	Men's sprint	31 July
Silver	Jerod Elcock; Eric Harrison Jr; Kion Benjamin; Kyle Greaux; Akanni Hislop	Athletics	Men's 4 × 100 m relay	7 August
Bronze	Nicholas Paul	Cycling	Men's 1km time trial	1 August

== Competitors ==
The following is the list of number of competitors participating at the Games per sport/discipline.

Sport	Men	Women	Total
Athletics	16	6	22
3x3 basketball	4	0	4
Beach volleyball	0	2	2
Boxing	2	1	3
Cycling	4	2	6
Gymnastics	0	1	1
Judo	3	1	4
Netball	—N/a	12	12
Squash	1	1	2
Swimming	5	1	6
Table tennis	1	2	3
Triathlon	2	2	4
Total	38	31	69

== Athletics ==
A squad of twenty-six athletes was officially selected as of 14 July 2022.

Men
Track and road events

Athlete	Event	Heat		Semifinal		Final	
Athlete	Event	Result	Rank	Result	Rank	Result	Rank
Kion Benjamin	100 m	10.34	2 Q	10.43	8	did not advance	
Jerod Elcock	100 m	10.26	1 Q	10.38	6	did not advance	
Eric Harrison Jr	100 m	10.37	3 q	10.44	7	did not advance	
Kyle Greaux	200 m	21.01	2 Q	20.91	4	Did not advance	
Dwight St. Hillaire	200 m	20.85	2 Q	20.95	3	Did not advance	
Jereem Richards	200 m	20.68	1 Q	20.40	1 Q	19.80	1st place, gold medalist(s)
Asa Guevara	400 m	45.98	3 Q	46.46	5	Did not advance	
Kashief King	400 m	48.08	4	Did not advance			
Che Lara	400 m	47.51	6	Did not advance			
Nicholas Landeau	800 m	1:53.69	7	Did not advance			
Jerod Elcock; Eric Harrison Jr; Kion Benjamin; Kyle Greaux; Akanni Hislop	4 × 100 m relay	38.84	2 Q	—N/a		38.70	2nd place, silver medalist(s)
Dwight St. Hillaire; Asa Guevara; Machel Cedenio; Jereem Richards; Che Lara; Kashief King	4 × 400 m relay	3:07.12	3 Q	—N/a		3:01.29	1st place, gold medalist(s)

Field events

Athlete	Event	Qualification		Final	
Athlete	Event	Distance	Rank	Distance	Rank
Kelsey Daniel	Long jump	7.49	13	did not advance	
Andwuelle Wright	Long jump	7.58	12 q	7.57	10
Kelsey Daniel	Triple jump	—N/a		15.95	9
Akeem Stewart	Shot put	—N/a		18.56	8
Keshorn Walcott	Javelin throw	—N/a		82.61	4

Women
Track and road events

Athlete	Event	Heat		Semifinal		Final	
Athlete	Event	Result	Rank	Result	Rank	Result	Rank
Michelle-Lee Ahye	100 m	11.14	1 Q	11.29	3	did not advance	
Leah Bertrand	100 m	DNS		did not advance			
Khalifa St. Fort	100 m	11.49	4	did not advance			
Mauricia Prieto	200 m	23.69	4 q	23.58	4	Did not advance	
Khalifa St. Fort; Michelle-Lee Ahye; Mauricia Prieto; Leah Bertrand; Akilah Lewis	4 × 100 m relay	43.48	4 q	—N/a		43.86	6

Field events

Athlete	Event	Qualification		Final	
Athlete	Event	Distance	Rank	Distance	Rank
Tyra Gittens	High jump	1.76	14	Did not advance	
Tyra Gittens	Long jump	6.28	13 q	6.27	11

== 3x3 basketball ==
By virtue of its status as the top Commonwealth Caribbean nation in the FIBA 3x3 Federation Rankings for men (on 1 November 2021), Trinidad and Tobago qualified for the men's tournament.

Four players were announced on 14 July 2022.

Summary

Team	Event	Group stage				Quarterfinal	Semifinal	Final / BM / CM	
Team	Event	Opposition Score	Opposition Score	Opposition Score	Rank	Opposition Score	Opposition Score	Opposition Score	Rank
Trinidad and Tobago men's	Men's tournament	Australia; L 6 - 21	England; L 6 - 21	New Zealand; L 12 - 21	4	did not advance			

=== Men's tournament ===
Roster

- Adrian Joseph
- Kemrick Julien
- Steven Lewis
- Sheldon Christian

Group play

Pos	Team	Pld	W	L	PF	PA	PD	Qualification
1	England (H)	3	3	0	59	28	+31	Direct to semi-finals
2	Australia	3	2	1	54	34	+20	Quarter-finals
3	New Zealand	3	1	2	42	54	−12	Quarter-finals
4	Trinidad and Tobago	3	0	3	24	63	−39	

Source: Birmingham 2022
Rules for classification: 1) Wins; 2) Head-to-head record; 3) Points scored.
(H) Hosts

30 July 2022
15:30

Report

Australia	21–6	Trinidad and Tobago
Pts: Johnson 11		Pts: Julien 3

Smithfield

30 July 2022
19:30

Report

England	21–6	Trinidad and Tobago
Pts: Hesson 9		Pts: Joseph 3

Smithfield

31 July 2022
19:30

Report

New Zealand	21–12	Trinidad and Tobago
Pts: Wynyard 8		Pts: Lewis 6

Smithfield

== Beach volleyball ==
As of 26 April 2022, Trinidad and Tobago qualified for the women's tournament. The intended Americas/Caribbean qualifier was abandoned, so the quota allocation was determined by their position among other nations from those regions in the women's FIVB Beach Volleyball World Rankings (for performances between 16 April 2018 and 31 March 2022).

Two players were selected as of 14 July 2022.

Athlete	Event	Preliminary Round				Quarterfinals	Semifinals	Finals	Rank
Athlete	Event	Opposition Score	Opposition Score	Opposition Score	Rank	Opposition Score	Opposition Score	Opposition Score	Rank
Phylecia Armstrong; Suraya Chase	Women's tournament	Cyprus; L 0-2	Australia; L 0-2	Sri Lanka; L 0-2	4	Did not advance			

=== Women's tournament ===
Group B

Pos	Team	Pld	W	L	Pts	SW	SL	SR	SPW	SPL	SPR	Qualification
1	Artacho – Clancy (AUS)	3	3	0	6	6	0	MAX	126	62	2.032	Quarterfinals
2	Konstantopoulou – Konstantinou (CYP)	3	2	1	5	4	2	2.000	111	84	1.321	Quarterfinals
3	Bandara – Weerasinghe (SRI)	3	1	2	4	2	4	0.500	40	84	0.476	Ranking of third-placed teams
4	Armstrong – Chase (TTO)	3	0	3	3	0	6	0.000	37	126	0.294	

Source: birmingham2022.com

Qualified for the Quarterfinals

31 July 2022; 19:00	Konstantopoulou – Konstantinou (CYP)	2–0	Armstrong – Chase (TTO)	Smithfield
31 July 2022; 19:00	(21–7, 21–17); Report			Smithfield

2 August 2022; 14:30	Artacho – Clancy (AUS)	2–0	Armstrong – Chase (TTO)	Smithfield
2 August 2022; 14:30	(21–7, 21–6); Report			Smithfield

4 August 2022; 19:00	Armstrong – Chase (TTO)	0–2	Bandara – Weerasinghe (SRI)	Smithfield
4 August 2022; 19:00	INJ; Report			Smithfield

== Boxing ==
A squad of three boxers was officially selected as of 14 July 2022.

Athlete	Event	Round of 32	Round of 16	Quarterfinals	Semifinals	Final	
Athlete	Event	Opposition Result	Opposition Result	Opposition Result	Opposition Result	Opposition Result	Rank
Anthony Joseph	Men's Featherweight	Bye	Hussain (PAK); L 2 - 3	did not advance			
Nigel Paul	Men's Super heavyweight	—N/a	Otendy (MRI); W RSC	Orie (ENG); L 0 - 5	did not advance		
Tianna Guy	Women's Featherweight	—N/a	Bye	Oshoba (NGR); L 2 - 3	did not advance		

== Cycling ==
A squad of six cyclists was officially selected as of 14 July 2022.

=== Road ===
Women

Athlete	Event	Time	Rank
Teniel Campbell	Road race	2:44:46	6
Teniel Campbell	Time trial	42:07.99	7

=== Track ===
Sprint

Athlete	Event	Qualification		Round 1	Quarterfinals	Semifinals	Final	
Athlete	Event	Time	Rank	Opposition Time	Opposition Time	Opposition Time	Opposition Time	Rank
Quincy Alexander	Men's sprint	10.339	22	did not advance				
Kwesi Browne	Men's sprint	10.011	12 Q	Cornish (AUS); L	did not advance			
Nicholas Paul	Men's sprint	9.445	1 Q	Webster (NZL); W	Dodyk (CAN); W	Glaetzer (AUS); W	Richardson (AUS); L	2nd place, silver medalist(s)

Keirin

Athlete	Event	1st Round	Repechage	Semifinals	Final
Athlete	Event	Rank	Rank	Rank	Rank
Quincy Alexander	Men's keirin	5 R	4	did not advance	
Kwesi Browne	Men's keirin	4 R	1 Q	2 Q	6
Nicholas Paul	Men's keirin	1 Q	Bye	1 Q	1st place, gold medalist(s)

Time trial

Athlete	Event	Time	Rank
Nicholas Paul	Men's time trial	1:00.089	3rd place, bronze medalist(s)

Points race

Athlete	Event	Final	
Athlete	Event	Points	Rank
Akil Campbell	Men's point race	DNF	
Alexi Costa-Ramirez	Women's points race	DNF	

Scratch race

Athlete	Event	Qualification	Final
Akil Campbell	Men's scratch race	10 Q	DNF
Alexi Costa-Ramirez	Women's scratch race	—N/a	15

== Gymnastics ==
One gymnast (Annalise Newman-Achee) was officially selected as of 14 July 2022.

=== Artistic ===
Women
Individual Qualification

Athlete	Event	Apparatus				Total	Rank
Athlete	Event	V	UB	BB	F	Total	Rank
Annalise Newman-Achee	Qualification	12.750	5.300	9.450	11.250	38.750	26

== Judo ==
A squad of four judoka was officially selected as of 14 July 2022.

Athlete	Event	Round of 32	Round of 16	Quarterfinals	Semifinals	Repechage	Final/BM	
Athlete	Event	Opposition Result	Opposition Result	Opposition Result	Opposition Result	Opposition Result	Opposition Result	Rank
Tyrone Charles	Men's -60 kg	Bye	Zulu (ZAM); L 00 - 10	did not advance				9
Jelanie Boyce	Men's -73 kg	—N/a	Green (NIR); L 00 - 11	did not advance				9
Xavier Jones	Men's -81 kg	—N/a	Weithers (BAR); L 00 - 10	did not advance				9
Gabriella Wood	Women's +78 kg	—N/a	Bye	Andrews (NZL); L 00 - 10	Did not advance	Durhone (MRI); W 10 - 00	Paduch (AUS); L 00 - 10	5

== Netball ==
By virtue of its position in the World Netball Rankings (as of 31 January 2022), Trinidad and Tobago qualified for the tournament.

Complete fixtures were announced in March 2022.

Summary

Team	Event	Group stage						Semifinal	Final / BM / Cl.	
Team	Event	Opposition Result	Opposition Result	Opposition Result	Opposition Result	Opposition Result	Rank	Opposition Result	Opposition Result	Rank
Trinidad and Tobago women	Women's tournament	England; L 22 - 74	Uganda; L 28 - 62	New Zealand; L 24 - 80	Malawi; L 30 - 70	Northern Ireland; L 32 - 41	6	Did not advance	Eleventh place match Barbados; W 63 - 31	11

Roster

Twelve players were selected on 7 July 2022.

- Shaquanda Greene-Noel (c)
- Aniecia Baptiste
- Jeresia McEchrane
- Joelisa Cooper (vc)
- Afeisha Noel
- Tiana Dillon
- Tahirah Hollingsworth
- Tia Bruno
- Janeisha Cassimy
- Oprah Douglas
- Faith Hagley
- Shantel Seemungal

Group play

Pos	Team	Pld	W	D	L	GF	GA	GD	Pts	Qualification
1	England (H)	5	5	0	0	321	169	+152	10	Semi-finals
2	New Zealand	5	4	0	1	325	188	+137	8	Semi-finals
3	Uganda	5	3	0	2	256	206	+50	6	Classification matches
4	Malawi	5	2	0	3	258	262	−4	4	Classification matches
5	Northern Ireland	5	1	0	4	155	299	−144	2	Classification matches
6	Trinidad and Tobago	5	0	0	5	136	327	−191	0	Classification matches

Source: Birmingham 2022
(H) Hosts

29 July 2022; 12:00	Report	England	74–22	Trinidad and Tobago	National Exhibition Centre; Umpires: Elizna Van Den Berg; Kate Wright
29 July 2022; 12:00	Report	Cardwell 30/30 (100%); Drakeford-Lewis 3/4 (75%); Harten 25/30 (83%); Housby 16/24 (67%)		Cooper 10/13 (77%); Noel 12/15 (80%)	National Exhibition Centre; Umpires: Elizna Van Den Berg; Kate Wright

31 July 2022; 18:00	Report	Uganda	62–28	Trinidad and Tobago	National Exhibition Centre; Umpires: Louise Travis; Tara Warner
31 July 2022; 18:00	Report	Cholhok 28/32 (88%); Eyaru 9/11 (82%); Nassanga 25/25 (100%)		Cooper 8/13 (62%); Noel 20/23 (87%)	National Exhibition Centre; Umpires: Louise Travis; Tara Warner

2 August 2022; 20:00	Report	New Zealand	80–24	Trinidad and Tobago	National Exhibition Centre; Umpires: Kate Wright; Elizna Van Den Berg
2 August 2022; 20:00	Report	Mes 8/10 (80%); Nweke 37/39 (95%); Selby-Rickit 19/22 (86%); Wilson 16/16 (100%)		Cooper 13/15 (87%); Noel 11/12 (92%)	National Exhibition Centre; Umpires: Kate Wright; Elizna Van Den Berg

3 August 2022; 18:00	Report	Malawi	70–30	Trinidad and Tobago	National Exhibition Centre; Umpires: Louise Travis; Anso Kemp
3 August 2022; 18:00	Report	Chimaliro 16/16 (100%); Kumwenda 27/28 (96%); Mvula 22/26 (85%); Simtowe 5/6 (83%)		Cooper 2/4 (50%); Hollingsworth 5/9 (56%); Noel 23/26 (88%)	National Exhibition Centre; Umpires: Louise Travis; Anso Kemp

4 August 2022; 14:00	Report	Trinidad and Tobago	32–41	Northern Ireland	National Exhibition Centre; Umpires: Anso Kemp; Alison Harrison
4 August 2022; 14:00	Report	Cooper 7/9 (78%); Hollingsworth 7/9 (78%); Noel 18/18 (100%)		Bowman 4/8 (50%); Crosbie 27/34 (79%); Magee 8/14 (57%); McGrath 2/3 (67%)	National Exhibition Centre; Umpires: Anso Kemp; Alison Harrison

Eleventh place match

5 August 2022; 09:00	Report	Barbados	31–63	Trinidad and Tobago	National Exhibition Centre; Umpires: Tracy-Ann Griffiths; Anso Kemp
5 August 2022; 09:00	Report	Agard 14/19 (74%); Blackman 9/10 (90%); Holder 1/1 (100%); Wharton 7/11 (64%)		Cooper 25/31 (81%); Noel 38/43 (88%)	National Exhibition Centre; Umpires: Tracy-Ann Griffiths; Anso Kemp

== Squash ==
A squad of two players was officially selected as of 14 July 2022.

Athlete	Event	Round of 64	Round of 32	Round of 16	Quarterfinals	Semifinals	Final	
Athlete	Event	Opposition Score	Opposition Score	Opposition Score	Opposition Score	Opposition Score	Opposition Score	Rank
Chayse McQuan	Men's singles	Baillargeon (CAN); L 0 - 3	did not advance					
Charlotte Knaggs	Women's singles	Sultana (MLT); L 2 - 3	did not advance					
Charlotte Knaggs; Chayse McQuan	Mixed doubles	—N/a	Naughton / Sachvie (CAN); L 0 - 2	did not advance				

== Swimming ==
A squad of six swimmers was officially selected as of 14 July 2022.

Men

Athlete	Event	Heat		Semifinal		Final	
Athlete	Event	Time	Rank	Time	Rank	Time	Rank
Dylan Carter	50 m freestyle	22.48	4 Q	22.35	5 Q	22.10	4
Graham Chatoor	400 m freestyle	4:05.50	20	—N/a		did not advance	
Graham Chatoor	1500 m freestyle	16:10.96	9	—N/a		did not advance	
Jeron Thompson	50 m backstroke	26.93	26	did not advance			
Dylan Carter	50 m butterfly	23.59	3 Q	23.41	3 Q	23.28	4
Cadell Lyons	100 m butterfly	54.63	22	did not advance			
Kael Yorke	100 m butterfly	54.62	21	did not advance			

Women

Athlete	Event	Heat		Semifinal		Final	
Athlete	Event	Time	Rank	Time	Rank	Time	Rank
Cherelle Thompson	50 m freestyle	25.64	11 Q	25.70	13	did not advance	

== Table tennis ==
A squad of three players was officially selected as of 14 July 2022.

Singles

Athletes	Event	Group stage				Round of 32	Round of 16	Quarterfinal	Semifinal	Final / BM	
Athletes	Event	Opposition Score	Opposition Score	Opposition Score	Rank	Opposition Score	Opposition Score	Opposition Score	Opposition Score	Opposition Score	Rank
Derron Douglas	Men's singles	Ridoy (BAN); L 2 - 4	Franklin (GUY); L 2 - 4	Khawaja (PAK); L 0 - 4	4	did not advance					
Rheann Chung	Women's singles	Bardsley (ENG); L 0 - 4	Meletie (CYP); L 3 - 4	—N/a	3	did not advance					
Catherine Spicer	Women's singles	Jalim (MRI); L 0 - 4	Hursey (WAL); L 0 - 4	—N/a	3	did not advance					

Doubles

Athletes	Event	Round of 64	Round of 32	Round of 16	Quarterfinal	Semifinal	Final / BM	
Athletes	Event	Opposition Score	Opposition Score	Opposition Score	Opposition Score	Opposition Score	Opposition Score	Rank
Catherine Spicer; Rheann Chung	Women's doubles	Bye	Batra / Chitale (IND); L 0 - 3	Did not advance				
Rheann Chung; Derron Douglas	Mixed doubles	Dalgleish / Plaistow (SCO); L 2 - 3	Did not advance					

== Triathlon ==
A squad of four triathletes was officially selected on 15 June 2022.

Individual

Athlete	Event	Swim (750 m)	Trans 1	Bike (20 km)	Trans 2	Run (5 km)	Total	Rank
Jason Costelloe	Men's	12:39	1:11	29:48	0:23	18:05	1:02:06	32
Jenna Ross	Women's	11:39	1:44	33:15	0:25	20:42	1:07:45	27

Mixed relay

Athletes	Event	Total Times per Athlete (Swim 300 m, Bike 5 km, Run 2 km)	Total Group Time	Rank
Jean-Marc Granderson; Kaya Rankine-Beadle; Jason Costelloe; Jenna Ross	Mixed relay	22:32; 26:03; 22:50; 24:16	1:35:41	11

== See also ==
- Trinidad and Tobago at the 2022 Winter Olympics
