= List of Czech records in track cycling =

The following are the national records in track cycling in Czech Republic maintained by the Czech Cycling Federation.

== Men ==
Key to tables: Awaiting ratification Record not kept by Czech Cycling Federation Not ratified or later rescinded by the Czech Cycling Federation

Event	Record	Athlete	Date	Meet	Place	Ref
Flying 200 m time trial	9.496	Dominik Topinka	3 February 2026	European Championships	Konya, Turkey	
250 m time trial (standing start)	17.409	Matěj Tamme	12 February 2025	European Championships	Heusden-Zolder, Belgium	
Flying 500 m time trial	26.914	Tomáš Bábek	13 October 2009		Vienna, Austria	
Team sprint (750 m)	42.271	Dominik Topinka; David Peterka; Adam Rauschgold	1 February 2026	European Championships	Konya, Turkey	
1 km time trial	57.919	David Peterka	2 February 2026	European Championships	Konya, Turkey	
1 km time trial (sea level)	59.870	David Peterka	24 October 2025	World Championships	Santiago, Chile	
4000m individual pursuit	4:16.882	Matyáš Koblížek	3 February 2026	European Championships	Konya, Turkey	
4000m team pursuit	4:08.224	Ondřej Rybín; Denis Rugovac; František Sisr; Ondřej Vendolský	10 July 2013	European U23 Championships	Anadia, Portugal	
Hour record	49.700 km	Ondřej Sosenka	19 July 2005		Moscow, Russia	

== Women ==
Event	Record	Athlete	Date	Meet	Place	Ref
Flying 200 m time trial	10.394	Veronika Jaborníková	2 February 2026	European Championship	Konya, Turkey	
250m time trial (standing start)	19.734	Veronika Jaborníková	14 March 2025	Nations Cup	Konya, Turkey	
Flying 500 m time trial	31.103	Lucie Záleská	27 April 2012		Prague, Czech Republic	
500 m time trial	34.041	Sára Kaňkovská	13 December 2014		Prague, Czech Republic	
500 m time trial	33.955	Veronika Jaborníková	11 February 2023	European Championships	Grenchen, Switzerland	
1 km time trial	1:04.732	Veronika Jaborníková	4 February 2026	European Championship	Konya, Turkey	
Team sprint (750 m)	47.726	Sára Peterková; Veronika Jaborníková; Anna Jaborníková	1 February 2026	European Championships	Konya, Turkey	
3000m individual pursuit	3:37.932	Lada Kozlíková	27 March 2008		Manchester, United Kingdom	
4000m individual pursuit	5:21.330	Gabriela Bártová	21 September 2025		Prostějov, Czech Republic	
3000m team pursuit	3:38.910	Dagmar Labáková; Martina Růžičková; Gabriela Slámová	12 August 2009		Prague, Czech Republic	
4000m team pursuit	4:50.083	Ema Cetkovská; Kateřina Kohoutková; Ema Kaňkovská; Barbora Dzerengová	12 July 2016	European Junior Championships	Montichiari, Italy	
Hour record	43.788 km	Jarmila Machačová	18 August 2020		Prague, Czech Republic	
