= Cycling at the 2022 Commonwealth Games – Men's keirin =

Cycling Track – Men's keirin at the 2022 Commonwealth Games
- Venue: Lee Valley VeloPark
- Dates: 30 July 2022
- Competitors: 24 from 9 nations

Medalists
gold medal	Nicholas Paul	Trinidad and Tobago
silver medal	Jack Carlin	Scotland
bronze medal	Shah Firdaus Sahrom	Malaysia

The Men's keirin at the 2022 Commonwealth Games was part of the cycling programme, and took place on 30 July 2022.

== Schedule ==
The schedule is as follows:

All times are British Summer Time (UTC+1)

Date	Time	Round
Saturday 30 July 2022	16:02	First round
Saturday 30 July 2022	16:44	First round repechages
Saturday 30 July 2022	17:41	Second round
Saturday 30 July 2022	18:17/18:27	Finals

== Results ==
=== First round ===
The top two in each heat advanced directly to the second round; the remainder were sent to the first round repechages.

==== Heat 1 ====
Rank	Rider	Gap	Notes
1	Matthew Glaetzer (AUS)	–	Q
2	Callum Saunders (NZL)	+0.036	Q
3	Joe Truman (ENG)	+0.092	R
4	Kwesi Browne (TTO)	+0.307	R
5	Ridwan Sahrom (MAS)	+0.443	R
6	Tyler Rorke (CAN)	+0.604	R

==== Heat 2 ====
Rank	Rider	Gap	Notes
1	Nicholas Paul (TTO)	–	Q
2	Sam Webster (NZL)	+0.238	Q
3	Thomas Cornish (AUS)	+0.299	R
4	David Beckham Elkatochoongo (IND)	+1.696	R
5	Hayden Norris (ENG)	+1.723	R
6	Malik Reid (JAM)	+9.264	R

==== Heat 3 ====
Rank	Rider	Gap	Notes
1	Hamish Turnbull (ENG)	–	Q
2	Jack Carlin (SCO)	+0.022	Q
3	Matthew Richardson (AUS)	+0.067	R
4	Nick Wammes (CAN)	+0.158	R
5	Fadhil Zonis (MAS)	+0.410	R
6	Daniel Palmer (JAM)	+5.414	R

==== Heat 4 ====
Rank	Rider	Gap	Notes
1	Shah Firdaus Sahrom (MAS)	–	Q
2	Sam Dakin (NZL)	+0.090	Q
3	Ryan Dodyk (CAN)	+0.503	R
4	Alistair Fielding (SCO)	+0.523	R
5	Quincy Alexander (TTO)	+0.410	R
6	Esow Alben (IND)	REL	R
	Zoe Boyd (JAM)	DNS	

=== First round repechages ===
Only the repechage winners advanced to the second round.

==== Heat 1 ====
Rank	Rider	Gap	Notes
1	Joe Truman (ENG)	–	Q
2	Alistair Fielding (SCO)	+0.086	
3	Fadhil Zonis (MAS)	+0.267	
4	Tyler Rorke (CAN)	+0.269	

==== Heat 2 ====
Rank	Rider	Gap	Notes
1	Thomas Cornish (AUS)	–	Q
2	Hayden Norris (ENG)	+0.123	
3	Malik Reid (JAM)	+4.036	
	Nick Wammes (CAN)	DSQ	

==== Heat 3 ====
Rank	Rider	Gap	Notes
1	Matthew Richardson (AUS)	–	Q
2	David Beckham Elkatochoongo (IND)	+0.046	
3	Ridwan Sahrom (MAS)	+0.907	
4	Quincy Alexander (TTO)	+0.943	

==== Heat 4 ====
Rank	Rider	Gap	Notes
1	Kwesi Browne (TTO)	–	Q
2	Esow Alben (IND)	+0.186	
3	Ryan Dodyk (CAN)	+0.598	
4	Daniel Palmer (JAM)	+2.157	

=== Second round ===
The top three in each heat advanced to the final; the remainder were sent to the small final (for places 7–12).

==== Heat 1 ====
Rank	Rider	Gap	Notes
1	Shah Firdaus Sahrom (MAS)	–	FA
2	Kwesi Browne (TTO)	+0.099	FA
3	Jack Carlin (SCO)	+0.223	FA
4	Sam Webster (NZL)	+0.357	FB
5	Matthew Glaetzer (AUS)	DNF	FB
5	Joe Truman (ENG)	DNF	FB

==== Heat 2 ====
Rank	Rider	Gap	Notes
1	Nicholas Paul (TTO)	–	FA
2	Callum Saunders (NZL)	+0.172	FA
3	Matthew Richardson (AUS)	+0.244	FA
4	Sam Dakin (NZL)	+0.288	FB
5	Hamish Turnbull (ENG)	+0.499	FB
6	Thomas Cornish (AUS)	+0.581	FB

=== Finals ===
The final classification is determined in the medal finals.

==== Final (places 7–12) ====
Rank	Rider	Gap
7	Sam Webster (NZL)	–
8	Thomas Cornish (AUS)	+0.196
9	Hamish Turnbull (ENG)	+0.205
10	Sam Dakin (NZL)	+0.381
11	Matthew Glaetzer (AUS)	DNS
11	Joe Truman (ENG)	DNS

==== Final (places 1–6) ====
Rank	Rider	Gap
1st place, gold medalist(s)	Nicholas Paul (TTO)	–
2nd place, silver medalist(s)	Jack Carlin (SCO)	+0.406
3rd place, bronze medalist(s)	Shah Firdaus Sahrom (MAS)	+0.424
4	Matthew Richardson (AUS)	+0.482
5	Callum Saunders (NZL)	+0.723
6	Kwesi Browne (TTO)	+0.838
