= 2025 UEC European Track Championships – Men's 1 km time trial =

Men's 1 km time trial at the 2025 UEC European Track Championships
- Venue: Velodroom Limburg, Heusden-Zolder
- Date: 13 February
- Competitors: 21 from 14 nations
- Winning time: 59.965

Medalists
gold medal	Matteo Bianchi	Italy
silver medal	Maximilian Dörnbach	Germany
bronze medal	David Peterka	Czech Republic

The men's 1 km time trial competition at the 2025 UEC European Track Championships was held on 13 February 2025.

== Results ==
=== Qualifying ===
The top 8 riders qualified for the final.

Rank	Name	Nation	Time	Behind	Notes
1	Matteo Bianchi	Italy	59.915		Q
2	Maximilian Dörnbach	Germany	1:00.323	+0.408	Q
3	David Peterka	Czech Republic	1:00.513	+0.598	Q
4	Daan Kool	Netherlands	1:00.708	+0.793	Q
5	Henric Hackmann	Germany	1:00.758	+0.843	Q
6	Eliasz Bednarek	Poland	1:01.342	+1.427	Q
7	Matěj Hytych	Czech Republic	1:01.551	+1.636	Q
8	Stefano Minuta	Italy	1:01.618	+1.703	Q
9	Ekain Jiménez	Spain	1:01.932	+2.017	
10	Étienne Oliviero	France	1:02.369	+2.454	
11	José Moreno	Spain	1:02.441	+2.526	
12	Iúri Leitão	Portugal	1:02.719	+2.804	
13	Lyall Craig	Great Britain	1:03.108	+3.193	
14	Harry Radford	Great Britain	1:03.885	+3.970	
15	Eimantas Vadapalas	Lithuania	1:04.146	+4.231	
16	Eduard Žalar	Slovenia	1:04.215	+4.300	
17	Noah Wulff	Denmark	1:04.326	+4.411	
18	Wannes Magdelijns	Belgium	1:04.956	+5.041	
19	Roman Gladysh	Ukraine	1:05.079	+5.164	
20	Mathijs Verhoeven	Belgium	1:05.242	+5.327	
21	Valentyn Varharakyn	Ukraine	1:06.331	+6.416	

=== Final ===
Rank	Name	Nation	Time	Behind	Notes
1st place, gold medalist(s)	Matteo Bianchi	Italy	59.965		
2nd place, silver medalist(s)	Maximilian Dörnbach	Germany	1:00.390	+0.425	
3rd place, bronze medalist(s)	David Peterka	Czech Republic	1:01.018	+1.053	
4	Daan Kool	Netherlands	1:01.125	+1.160	
5	Eliasz Bednarek	Poland	1:01.201	+1.236	
6	Henric Hackmann	Germany	1:01.244	+1.279	
7	Stefano Minuta	Italy	1:02.118	+2.153	
8	Matěj Hytych	Czech Republic	1:02.153	+2.188	
