= Track cycling at the 2026 Commonwealth Games – Men's keirin =

Cycling Track – Men's keirin at the 2026 Commonwealth Games
- Venue: Sir Chris Hoy Velodrome
- Dates: 31 July

Medalists
gold medal	Azizulhasni Awang	Malaysia
silver medal	Leigh Hoffman	Australia
bronze medal	Harry Ledingham-Horn	England

The men's keirin at the 2026 Commonwealth Games was part of the cycling programme, and took place on 31 July 2026.

== Schedule ==
The schedule is as follows:

All times are British Summer Time (UTC+1)

Date	Time	Round
Friday 31 July 2026	16:00	First round
Friday 31 July 2026	16:47	First round repechages
Friday 31 July 2026	18:31	Second round
Friday 31 July 2026	19:13/19:18	Finals

== Results ==
=== First round ===
The top two in each heat advanced directly to the second round; the remainder were sent to the first round repechages.

==== Heat 1 ====
Rank	Rider	Gap	Notes
1	Harry Radford (ENG)	–	Q
2	Cole Dempster (CAN)	+0.028	Q
3	Nicholas Paul (TTO)	+0.131	R
4	Steffan Lloyd (WAL)	+0.164	R
5	Sam Dakin (NZL)	+0.181	R
6	Niall Monks (SCO)	+0.548	R
7	Ronaldo Laitonjam (IND)	+0.691	R

==== Heat 2 ====
Rank	Rider	Gap	Notes
1	Leigh Hoffman (AUS)	–	Q
2	Harry Ledingham-Horn (ENG)	+0.453	Q
3	Lyall Craig (SCO)	+0.474	R
4	James Hedgcock (CAN)	+1.168	R
5	Mitchell Sparrow (RSA)	+1.372	R
6	Ioan Hepburn (WAL)	+1.431	R
7	Zion Pulido (TTO)	+1.741	R

==== Heat 3 ====
Rank	Rider	Gap	Notes
1	Daniel Barber (AUS)	–	Q
2	Azizulhasni Awang (MAS)	+0.204	Q
3	Peter Mitchell (SCO)	+0.374	R
4	Tyler Rorke (CAN)	+0.441	R
5	David Elkatohchoongo (IND)	+0.780	R
6	Atiba Jamal Quildan (ANT)	+4.596	R
7	Farrakhan Shaaban Mohammed (GHA)	+8.400	R

==== Heat 4 ====
Rank	Rider	Gap	Notes
1	Tayte Ryan (AUS)	–	Q
2	Muhammad Shah Firdaus Sahrom (MAS)	+0.603	Q
3	Jonah Jenkins (WAL)	+0.794	R
4	Hamish Turnbull (ENG)	+1.401	R
5	Jemsh Keithellakram (IND)	+1.534	R
6	Njisane Phillip (TTO)	+2.882	R

=== First round repechages ===
Only the repechage winners advanced to the second round.

==== Heat 1 ====
Rank	Rider	Gap	Notes
1	Nicholas Paul (TTO)	–	Q
2	Hamish Turnbull (ENG)	+0.417	
3	Ioan Hepburn (WAL)	+0.509	
4	David Elkatohchoongo (IND)	+1.194	
5	Ronaldo Latonjam (IND)	+2.609	

==== Heat 2 ====
Rank	Rider	Gap	Notes
1	Tyler Rorke (CAN)	–	Q
2	Lyall Craig (SCO)	+0.023	
3	Mitchell Sparrow (RSA)	+0.148	
	Niall Monks (SCO)	+0.450	

==== Heat 3 ====
Rank	Rider	Gap	Notes
1	Peter Mitchell (SCO)	–	Q
2	Njisane Phillip (TTO)	+0.055	
3	James Hedgcock (CAN)	+0.119	
4	Sam Dakin (NZL)	+0.765	
5	Farrakhan Shaaban Mohammed (GHA)	+9.028	

==== Heat 4 ====
Rank	Rider	Gap	Notes
1	Jonah Jenkins (WAL)	–	Q
2	Steffan Lloyd (WAL)	+0.152	
3	Zion Pulido (TTO)	+0.528	
4	Jemsh Keithellakram (IND)	+0.615	
5	Atiba Jamal Quildan (ANT)	+3.740	

=== Second round ===
The top three in each heat advanced to the final; the remainder were sent to the small final (for places 7–12).

==== Heat 1 ====
Rank	Rider	Gap	Notes
1	Tayte Ryan (AUS)	–	FA
2	Azizulhasni Awang (MAS)	+0.102	FA
3	Nicholas Paul (TTO)	+0.180	FA
4	Peter Mitchell (SCO)	+0.356	FB
5	Harry Radford (ENG)	+0.963	FB
6	Cole Dempster (CAN)	+1.121	FB

==== Heat 2 ====
Rank	Rider	Gap	Notes
1	Leigh Hoffman (AUS)	–	FA
2	Daniel Barber (AUS)	+0.106	FA
3	Harry Ledingham-Horn (ENG)	+0.175	FA
4	Muhammad Shah Firdaus Sahrom (MAS)	+0.191	FB
5	Jonah Jenkins (WAL)	+0.641	FB
6	Tyler Rorke (CAN)	+0.648	FB

=== Finals ===
The final classification is determined in the medal finals.

==== Final (places 7–12) ====
Rank	Rider	Gap
7	Muhammad Shah Firdaus Sahrom (MAS)	–
8	Peter Mitchell (SCO)	+0.236
9	Harry Radford (ENG)	+0.381
10	Jonah Jenkins (WAL)	+0.458
11	Cole Dempster (CAN)	+0.484
12	Tyler Rorke (CAN)	+0.549

==== Final (places 1–6) ====
Rank	Rider	Gap
1st place, gold medalist(s)	Azizulhasni Awang (MAS)	–
2nd place, silver medalist(s)	Leigh Hoffman (AUS)	+0.109
3rd place, bronze medalist(s)	Harry Ledingham-Horn (ENG)	+0.243
4	Nicholas Paul (TTO)	+0.353
5	Daniel Barber (AUS)	+0.387
6	Tayte Ryan (AUS)	+0.528
