= Cycling at the 2022 Commonwealth Games – Men's sprint =

Cycling Track – Men's sprint at the 2022 Commonwealth Games
- Venue: Lee Valley VeloPark
- Dates: 31 July
- Competitors: 26 from 10 nations

Medalists
| gold medal | Matthew Richardson | Australia |
| silver medal | Nicholas Paul | Trinidad and Tobago |
| bronze medal | Jack Carlin | Scotland |

The men's sprint at the 2022 Commonwealth Games was part of the cycling programme, which took place on 31 July 2022.

== Records ==
Prior to this competition, the existing world and Games records were as follows:

| World record | Nicholas Paul (TTO) | 9.100 | Cochabamba, Bolivia | 6 September 2019 |
| Games record | Matthew Glaetzer (AUS) | 9.583 | Brisbane, Australia | 7 April 2018 |

== Schedule ==
The schedule is as follows:

All times are British Summer Time (UTC+1)

| Date | Time | Round |
|---|---|---|
| Sunday 31 July 2022 | 10:02 | Qualifying |
| Sunday 31 July 2022 | 10:57 | 1/8 finals |
| Sunday 31 July 2022 | 11:34 | Quarterfinals |
| Sunday 31 July 2022 | 15:10 | Semifinals |
| Sunday 31 July 2022 | 17:42 | Finals |

== Results ==
=== Qualifying ===
Top 16 riders qualified for the 1/8 finals.

| Rank | Riders | Time | Behind | Notes |
|---|---|---|---|---|
| 1 | Nicholas Paul (TTO) | 9.445 | — | Q, GR |
| 2 | Matthew Richardson (AUS) | 9.598 | +0.153 | Q |
| 3 | Jack Carlin (SCO) | 9.599 | +0.154 | Q |
| 4 | Matthew Glaetzer (AUS) | 9.652 | +0.207 | Q |
| 5 | Thomas Cornish (AUS) | 9.747 | +0.302 | Q |
| 6 | Hamish Turnbull (ENG) | 9.790 | +0.345 | Q |
| 7 | Muhammad Shah Firdaus Sahrom (MAS) | 9.846 | +0.401 | Q |
| 8 | Nick Wammes (CAN) | 9.860 | +0.415 | Q |
| 9 | Ryan Dodyk (CAN) | 9.920 | +0.475 | Q |
| 10 | Sam Dakin (NZL) | 9.928 | +0.483 | Q |
| 11 | Tyler Rorke (CAN) | 9.986 | +0.541 | Q |
| 12 | Kwesi Browne (TTO) | 10.011 | +0.566 | Q |
| 13 | Ronaldo Laitonjam (IND) | 10.012 | +0.567 | Q |
| 14 | Alistair Fielding (SCO) | 10.020 | +0.575 | Q |
| 15 | Ryan Owens (ENG) | 10.026 | +0.581 | Q |
| 16 | Sam Webster (NZL) | 10.033 | +0.588 | Q |
| 17 | Callum Saunders (NZL) | 10.060 | +0.615 | |
| 18 | David Beckham Elkatohchoongo (IND) | 10.120 | +0.675 | |
| 19 | Hayden Norris (ENG) | 10.129 | +0.684 | |
| 20 | Muhammad Ridwan Sahrom (MAS) | 10.226 | +0.781 | |
| 21 | Muhammad Fadhil Mohd Zonis (MAS) | 10.310 | +0.865 | |
| 22 | Quincy Alexander (TTO) | 10.339 | +0.894 | |
| 23 | Esow Alben (IND) | 10.361 | +0.916 | |
| 24 | Daniel Palmer (JAM) | 11.128 | +1.683 | |
| 25 | Malik Reid (JAM) | 11.249 | +1.804 | |
| 26 | Emmanuel Sackey (GHA) | 12.729 | +3.284 | |
| | Zoe Bold (JAM) | Did not start | | |

=== 1/8 finals ===
Heat winners advanced to the quarterfinals.

| Heat | Rank | Riders | Gap | Notes |
|---|---|---|---|---|
| 1 | 1 | Nicholas Paul (TTO) | — | Q |
| 1 | 2 | Sam Webster (NZL) | +0.151 | |
| 2 | 1 | Matthew Richardson (AUS) | — | Q |
| 2 | 2 | Ryan Owens (ENG) | +0.575 | |
| 3 | 1 | Jack Carlin (SCO) | — | Q |
| 3 | 2 | Alistair Fielding (SCO) | +0.035 | |
| 4 | 1 | Matthew Glaetzer (AUS) | — | Q |
| 4 | 2 | Ronaldo Laitonjam (IND) | +0.162 | |
| 5 | 1 | Thomas Cornish (AUS) | — | Q |
| 5 | 2 | Kwesi Browne (TTO) | +0.066 | |
| 6 | 1 | Hamish Turnbull (ENG) | — | Q |
| 6 | 2 | Tyler Rorke (CAN) | +0.087 | |
| 7 | 1 | Muhammad Shah Firdaus Sahrom (MAS) | — | Q |
| 7 | 2 | Sam Dakin (NZL) | +0.037 | |
| 8 | 1 | Ryan Dodyk (CAN) | — | Q |
| 8 | 2 | Nick Wammes (CAN) | +0.035 | |

=== Quarterfinals ===
Matches are extended to a best-of-three format hereon; winners proceed to the semifinals.

| Heat | Rank | Riders | Race 1 | Race 2 | Decider (i.r.) | Notes |
|---|---|---|---|---|---|---|
| 1 | 1 | Nicholas Paul (TTO) | X | X | | Q |
| 1 | 2 | Ryan Dodyk (CAN) | +0.276 | +0.057 | | |
| 2 | 1 | Matthew Richardson (AUS) | X | +0.040 | X | Q |
| 2 | 2 | Muhammad Shah Firdaus Sahrom (MAS) | +6.355 | X | +0.067 | |
| 3 | 1 | Jack Carlin (SCO) | X | X | | Q |
| 3 | 2 | Hamish Turnbull (ENG) | +0.087 | +0.151 | | |
| 4 | 1 | Matthew Glaetzer (AUS) | X | X | | Q |
| 4 | 2 | Thomas Cornish (AUS) | +0.327 | +0.124 | | |

=== Semifinals ===
Winners proceed to the gold medal final; losers proceed to the bronze medal final.

| Heat | Rank | Riders | Race 1 | Race 2 | Decider (i.r.) | Notes |
|---|---|---|---|---|---|---|
| 1 | 1 | Nicholas Paul (TTO) | REL | X | X | QG |
| 1 | 2 | Matthew Glaetzer (AUS) | X | +0.154 | +1.799 | QB |
| 2 | 1 | Matthew Richardson (AUS) | +0.008 | X | X | QG |
| 2 | 2 | Jack Carlin (SCO) | X | +0.015 | +0.008 | QB |

=== Finals ===
The final classification is determined in the medal finals.

| Rank | Riders | Race 1 | Race 2 | Decider (i.r.) |
|---|---|---|---|---|
Gold medal final
| 1st place, gold medalist(s) | Matthew Richardson (AUS) | X | X | |
| 2nd place, silver medalist(s) | Nicholas Paul (TTO) | +0.029 | +0.628 | |
Bronze medal final
| 3rd place, bronze medalist(s) | Jack Carlin (SCO) | X | +0.010 | X |
| 4 | Matthew Glaetzer (AUS) | +0.035 | X | REL |
