= 2023 UCI Track Cycling World Championships – Men's team sprint =

Men's team sprint at the 2023 UCI Track Cycling World Championships
- Venue: Sir Chris Hoy Velodrome
- Location: Glasgow, Scotland
- Dates: 3–4 August
- Competitors: 56 from 18 nations
- Teams: 18
- Winning time: 41.647

Medalists
gold medal	Roy van den Berg; Harrie Lavreysen; Jeffrey Hoogland	Netherlands
silver medal	Leigh Hoffman; Matthew Richardson; Matthew Glaetzer; Thomas Cornish	Australia
bronze medal	Florian Grengbo; Sébastien Vigier; Rayan Helal	France

The Men's team sprint competition at the 2023 UCI Track Cycling World Championships was held on 3 and 4 August 2023.

== Results ==
=== Qualifying ===
The qualifying was started on 3 August at 11:47. The eight fastest teams advanced to the first round.

Rank	Nation	Time	Behind	Notes
1	Netherlands; Roy van den Berg; Harrie Lavreysen; Jeffrey Hoogland	42.046		Q
2	Australia; Leigh Hoffman; Matthew Richardson; Thomas Cornish	42.531	+0.485	Q
3	Poland; Maciej Bielecki; Mateusz Rudyk; Patryk Rajkowski	42.916	+0.870	Q
4	Japan; Yoshitaku Nagasako; Kaiya Ota; Yuta Obara	42.961	+0.915	Q
5	France; Florian Grengbo; Sébastien Vigier; Rayan Helal	42.965	+0.919	Q
6	Great Britain; Alistair Fielding; Hamish Turnbull; Joseph Truman	42.973	+0.927	Q
7	Germany; Luca Spiegel; Nik Schroter; Maximilian Dörnbach	43.106	+1.060	Q
8	China; Guo Shuai; Zhou Yu; Xue Chenxi	43.658	+1.612	Q
9	Canada; Tyler Rorke; Nick Wammes; James Hedgcock	43.661	+1.615	
10	Italy; Daniele Napolitano; Matteo Bianchi; Mattia Predomo	43.749	+1.703	
11	Czech Republic; Matěj Bohuslávek; Dominik Topinka; Martin Čechman	43.893	+1.847	
12	Colombia; Carlos Echeverri; Kevin Quintero; Santiago Ramírez	43.999	+1.953	
13	Mexico; Jafet López; Edgar Verdugo; Juan Ruiz	44.411	+2.365	
14	Malaysia; Umar Hasbullah; Muhammad Ridwan Sahrom; Fadhil Zonis	44.583	+2.537	
15	Spain; José Moreno; Alejandro Martínez; Ekain Jiménez	44.640	+2.594	
16	Lithuania; Laurynas Vinskas; Justas Beniušis; Vasilijus Lendel	45.069	+3.646	
17	India; Rojit Singh; Ronaldo Laitonjam; David Elkathchoongo	45.692	+3.023	
18	Egypt; Ahmed Saad; Hussein Hassan; Mahmoud Bakr	48.828	+6.782	

=== First round ===
The first round was held on 4 August at 19:45.

First round heats were held as follows:
Heat 1: 4th v 5th fastest
Heat 2: 3rd v 6th fastest
Heat 3: 2nd v 7th fastest
Heat 4: 1st v 8th fastest

The heat winners were ranked on time, from which the top two advanced to the gold medal race and the other two proceeded to the bronze medal race.

Heat	Rank	Nation	Time	Notes
1	1	France; Florian Grengbo; Sébastien Vigier; Rayan Helal	42.757	QB
1	2	Japan; Yoshitaku Nagasako; Kaiya Ota; Yuta Obara	42.948	
2	1	Great Britain; Alistair Fielding; Hamish Turnbull; Jack Carlin	42.821	QB
2	2	Poland; Maciej Bielecki; Mateusz Rudyk; Patryk Rajkowski	43.853	
3	1	Australia; Leigh Hoffman; Matthew Richardson; Matthew Glaetzer	42.130	QG
3	2	Germany; Luca Spiegel; Nik Schroter; Maximilian Dörnbach	42.920	
4	1	Netherlands; Roy van den Berg; Harrie Lavreysen; Jeffrey Hoogland	41.847	QG
4	2	China; Guo Shuai; Zhou Yu; Xue Chenxi	43.490	

=== Finals ===
The finals were on 4 August at 19:45.

Rank	Nation	Time	Behind	Notes
Gold medal race
1st place, gold medalist(s)	Netherlands; Roy van den Berg; Harrie Lavreysen; Jeffrey Hoogland	41.647		
2nd place, silver medalist(s)	Australia; Leigh Hoffman; Matthew Richardson; Matthew Glaetzer	41.682		
Bronze medal race
3rd place, bronze medalist(s)	France; Florian Grengbo; Sébastien Vigier; Rayan Helal	42.583		
4	Great Britain; Alistair Fielding; Hamish Turnbull; Joseph Truman	42.946		
