= 2025 UEC European Track Championships – Men's team sprint =

Men's team sprint at the 2025 UEC European Track Championships
- Venue: Velodroom Limburg, Heusden-Zolder
- Date: 12 February
- Competitors: 38 from 12 nations
- Winning time: 42.609

Medalists
gold medal	Timmy Gillion; Rayan Helal; Sébastien Vigier	France
silver medal	Harrie Lavreysen; Loris Leneman; Tijmen van Loon	Netherlands
bronze medal	Harry Ledingham-Horn; Hayden Norris; Harry Radford	Great Britain

The men's team sprint competition at the 2025 UEC European Track Championships was held on 12 February 2025.

== Results ==
=== Qualifying ===
The eight fastest teams advanced to the first round.

Rank	Nation	Time	Behind	Notes
1	Czech Republic; Matěj Tamme; Dominik Topinka; David Peterka	43.337		Q
2	Netherlands; Loris Leneman; Harrie Lavreysen; Tijmen van Loon	43.404	+0.067	Q
3	Great Britain; Harry Radford; Hayden Norris; Harry Ledingham-Horn	43.496	+0.159	Q
4	Germany; Nik Schröter; Luca Spiegel; Maximilian Dörnbach	43.560	+0.223	Q
5	France; Timmy Gillion; Rayan Helal; Sébastien Vigier	43.606	+0.269	Q
6	Poland; Daniel Rochna; Konrad Burawski; Mateusz Rudyk	43.732	+0.395	Q
7	Italy; Daniele Napolitano; Stefano Minuta; Mattia Predomo	43.906	+0.569	Q
8	Spain; Esteban Sánchez; José Moreno; Ekain Jiménez	44.892	+1.555	Q
9	Belgium; Mathijs Verhoeven; Runar De Schrijver; Lowie Nulens	44.938	+1.601	
10	Ukraine; Vladyslav Denysenko; Bohdan Danylchuk; Valentyn Varharakyn	45.329	+1.992	
11	Lithuania; Laurynas Vinskas; Vasilijus Lendel; Eimantas Vadapalas	45.536	+2.199	
12	Greece; Ioannis Kalogeropoulos; Konstantinos Livanos; Miltiadis Charovas	46.089	+2.752	

=== First round ===
First round heats were held as follows:
Heat 1: 4th v 5th fastest
Heat 2: 3rd v 6th fastest
Heat 3: 2nd v 7th fastest
Heat 4: 1st v 8th fastest

The heat winners were ranked on time, from which the top 2 proceeded to the gold medal final and the other 2 proceeded to the bronze medal final.

Heat	Rank	Nation	Time	Notes
1	1	France; Sébastien Vigier; Timmy Gillion; Rayan Helal	42.964	QG
1	2	Germany; Maximilian Dörnbach; Nik Schröter; Luca Spiegel	43.237	
2	1	Great Britain; Harry Ledingham-Horn; Hayden Norris; Harry Radford	43.284	QB
2	2	Poland; Daniel Rochna; Mateusz Rudyk; Rafał Sarnecki	43.419	
3	1	Netherlands; Harrie Lavreysen; Loris Leneman; Tijmen van Loon	43.090	QG
3	2	Italy; Stefano Minuta; Mattia Predomo; Matteo Bianchi	43.565	
4	1	Czech Republic; Matěj Tamme; David Peterka; Dominik Topinka	43.297	QB
4	2	Spain; Ekain Jiménez; José Moreno; Esteban Sánchez	44.664	

=== Finals ===
Rank	Nation	Time	Behind	Notes
Gold medal final
1st place, gold medalist(s)	France; Timmy Gillion; Rayan Helal; Sébastien Vigier	42.609		
2nd place, silver medalist(s)	Netherlands; Harrie Lavreysen; Loris Leneman; Tijmen van Loon	43.253	+0.644	
Bronze medal final
3rd place, bronze medalist(s)	Great Britain; Harry Ledingham-Horn; Hayden Norris; Harry Radford	43.152		
4	Czech Republic; David Peterka; Matěj Tamme; Dominik Topinka	44.049	+0.897	
