= List of Italian records in track cycling =

The following are the national records in track cycling in Italy maintained by the Federazione Ciclistica Italiana (FCI).

== Men ==
Event	Record	Athlete	Date	Meet	Place	Ref
Flying 200m time trial	9.443	Mattia Predomo	3 February 2026	European Championships	Konya, Turkey	
250m time trial (standing start)	17.122	Matteo Bianchi	1 February 2026	European Championships	Konya, Turkey	
Team sprint	42.285	Matteo Bianchi; Stefano Minuta; Mattia Predomo	1 February 2026	European Championships	Konya, Turkey	
1km time trial	58.490	Matteo Bianchi	2 February 2026	European Championships	Konya, Turkey	
1km time trial (sea level)	59.460	Matteo Bianchi	14 October 2022	World Championships	Saint-Quentin-en-Yvelines, France	
4000m individual pursuit	3:58.850 WR	Jonathan Milan	16 October 2026	World Championships	Shanghai, China	
4000m team pursuit	3:42.032	Simone Consonni; Filippo Ganna; Francesco Lamon; Jonathan Milan	4 August 2021	Olympic Games	Izu, Japan	
Hour record	56.792 km	Filippo Ganna	8 October 2022		Grenchen, Switzerland	

== Women ==
Event	Record	Athlete	Date	Meet	Place	Ref
Flying 200m time trial	10.397	Miriam Vece	2 February 2026	European Championship	Konya, Turkey	
250m time trial (standing start)	18.706	Miriam Vece	29 February 2020	World Championships	Berlin, Germany	
500m time trial	33.171	Miriam Vece	29 February 2020	World Championships	Berlin, Germany	
500m time trial (sea level)	33.171	Miriam Vece	29 February 2020	World Championships	Berlin, Germany	
1 km time trial	1:03.708	Miriam Vece	4 February 2026	European Championship	Konya, Turkey	
Team sprint (500 m)	33.797	Miriam Vece; Elena Bissolati	19 October 2017	European Championships	Berlin, Germany	
Team sprint (750 m)	47.765	Siria Trevisan; Matilde Cenci; Miriam Vece	1 February 2026	European Championships	Konya, Turkey	
3000m individual pursuit	3:20.345	Vittoria Bussi	15 September 2024		Aguascalientes, Mexico	
4000m individual pursuit	4:22.909	Federica Venturelli	4 February 2026	European Championships	Konya, Turkey	
3000m team pursuit	3:25.612	Simona Frapporti; Beatrice Bartelloni; Gulia Donato	17 January 2013	World Cup	Aguascalientes, Mexico	
4000m team pursuit	4:06.796	Elisa Balsamo; Letizia Paternoster; Federica Venturelli; Linda Sanarini	2 February 2026	European Championships	Konya, Turkey	
Hour record	50.455 km	Vittoria Bussi	10 May 2025		Aguascalientes, Mexico	
