= 2023 UCI Track Cycling World Championships – Men's sprint =

Men's sprint at the 2023 UCI Track Cycling World Championships
- Venue: Sir Chris Hoy Velodrome
- Location: Glasgow, United Kingdom
- Dates: 5–7 August
- Competitors: 35 from 21 nations

Medalists
gold medal	Harrie Lavreysen	Netherlands
silver medal	Nicholas Paul	Trinidad and Tobago
bronze medal	Jack Carlin	Great Britain

The Men's sprint competition at the 2023 UCI Track Cycling World Championships was held from 5 to 7 August 2023.

== Results ==
=== Qualifying ===
The qualifying was started on 5 August at 10:58. The top four riders advanced directly to the 1/8 finals; places 5 to 28 advanced to the 1/16 final.

Rank	Name	Nation	Time	Behind	Notes
1	Harrie Lavreysen	Netherlands	9.374		Q
2	Mateusz Rudyk	Poland	9.527	+0.153	Q
3	Nicholas Paul	Trinidad and Tobago	9.529	+0.155	Q
4	Azizulhasni Awang	Malaysia	9.584	+0.210	Q
5	Jack Carlin	Great Britain	9.606	+0.232	Q
6	Jair Tjon En Fa	Suriname	9.630	+0.256	Q
7	Maximilian Dörnbach	Germany	9.657	+0.283	Q
8	Matthew Richardson	Australia	9.696	+0.322	Q
9	Mikhail Iakovlev	Israel	9.726	+0.352	Q
10	Kaiya Ota	Japan	9.728	+0.354	Q
11	Joseph Truman	Great Britain	9.728	+0.354	Q
12	Kevin Quintero	Colombia	9.739	+0.365	Q
13	Thomas Cornish	Australia	9.748	+0.374	Q
14	Ryan Dodyk	Canada	9.761	+0.387	Q
15	Kohei Terasaki	Japan	9.765	+0.391	Q
16	Vasilijus Lendel	Lithuania	9.781	+0.407	Q
17	Matthew Glaetzer	Australia	9.785	+0.411	Q
18	Nick Wammes	Canada	9.797	+0.423	Q
19	Jeffrey Hoogland	Netherlands	9.801	+0.427	Q
20	Rayan Helal	France	9.802	+0.428	Q
21	Cristian Ortega	Colombia	9.823	+0.449	Q
22	Sándor Szalontay	Hungary	9.854	+0.480	Q
23	Sébastien Vigier	France	9.881	+0.507	Q
24	Martin Čechman	Czech Republic	9.887	+0.513	Q
25	Muhammad Shah Firdaus Sahrom	Malaysia	9.900	+0.526	Q
26	Jai Angsuthasawit	Thailand	9.904	+0.530	Q
27	Rafał Sarnecki	Poland	9.905	+0.531	Q
28	Sam Dakin	New Zealand	9.908	+0.534	Q
29	Mattia Predomo	Italy	9.947	+0.573	
30	Willy Weinrich	Germany	9.997	+0.623	
31	Tijmen van Loon	Netherlands	10.001	+0.627	
32	Alejandro Martínez	Spain	10.056	+0.682	
33	Jean Spies	South Africa	10.097	+0.723	
34	Kwesi Browne	Trinidad and Tobago	10.197	+0.823	
35	Fadhil Zonis	Malaysia	10.225	+0.851	

=== 1/16 finals ===
The 1/16 finals were held on 5 August at 12:31.

Heat	Rank	Name	Nation	Gap	Notes
1	1	Jack Carlin	Great Britain		Q
1	2	Sam Dakin	New Zealand	+0.086	
2	1	Jair Tjon En Fa	Suriname		Q
2	2	Rafał Sarnecki	Poland	+0.047	
3	1	Maximilian Dörnbach	Germany		Q
3	2	Jai Angsuthasawit	Thailand	+0.520	
4	1	Matthew Richardson	Australia		Q
4	2	Muhammad Shah Firdaus Sahrom	Malaysia	+0.119	
5	1	Mikhail Iakovlev	Israel		Q
5	2	Martin Čechman	Czech Republic	+0.139	
6	1	Kaiya Ota	Japan		Q
6	2	Sébastien Vigier	France	+0.050	
7	1	Joseph Truman	Great Britain		Q
7	2	Sándor Szalontay	Hungary	+0.150	
8	1	Kevin Quintero	Colombia		Q
8	2	Cristian Ortega	Colombia	+0.021	
9	1	Thomas Cornish	Australia		Q
9	2	Rayan Helal	France	+0.096	
10	1	Jeffrey Hoogland	Netherlands		Q
10	2	Ryan Dodyk	Canada	+0.088	
11	1	Kohei Terasaki	Japan		Q
11	2	Nick Wammes	Canada	+0.055	
12	1	Matthew Glaetzer	Australia		Q
12	2	Vasilijus Lendel	Lithuania	+0.076	

=== 1/8 finals ===
The 1/8 finals were held on 5 August at 14:08.

Heat	Rank	Name	Nation	Gap	Notes
1	1	Harrie Lavreysen	Netherlands		Q
1	2	Matthew Glaetzer	Australia	+0.046	
2	1	Mateusz Rudyk	Poland		Q
2	2	Kohei Terasaki	Japan	+0.003	
3	1	Nicholas Paul	Trinidad and Tobago		Q
3	2	Jeffrey Hoogland	Netherlands	+0.193	
4	1	Thomas Cornish	Australia		Q
4	2	Azizulhasni Awang	Malaysia		REL
5	1	Jack Carlin	Great Britain		Q
5	2	Kevin Quintero	Colombia	+0.035	
6	1	Joseph Truman	Great Britain		Q
6	2	Jair Tjon En Fa	Suriname	+0.003	
7	1	Kaiya Ota	Japan		Q
7	2	Maximilian Dörnbach	Germany	+0.072	
8	1	Matthew Richardson	Australia		Q
8	2	Mikhail Iakovlev	Israel	+0.079	

=== Quarterfinals ===
The quarterfinals were started on 6 August at 12:08.

Heat	Rank	Name	Nation	Race 1	Race 2	Decider (i.r.)	Notes
1	1	Harrie Lavreysen	Netherlands	X	X		Q
1	2	Matthew Richardson	Australia	+0.324	+0.040		
2	1	Mateusz Rudyk	Poland	X	X		Q
2	2	Kaiya Ota	Japan	+0.052	+0.006		
3	1	Nicholas Paul	Trinidad and Tobago	X	X		Q
3	2	Joseph Truman	Great Britain	+0.265	+0.061		
4	1	Jack Carlin	Great Britain	X	X		Q
4	2	Thomas Cornish	Australia	+0.036	+0.061		

=== Semifinals ===
The semifinals were started on 6 August at 12:21.

Heat	Rank	Name	Nation	Race 1	Race 2	Decider (i.r.)	Notes
1	1	Harrie Lavreysen	Netherlands	X	X		Q
1	2	Jack Carlin	Great Britain	+0.505	+0.041		
2	1	Nicholas Paul	Trinidad and Tobago	X	X		Q
2	2	Mateusz Rudyk	Poland	+0.192	+0.380		

=== Finals ===
The finals were started on 7 August at 18:55.

Rank	Name	Nation	Race 1	Race 2	Decider (i.r.)
Gold medal race
1st place, gold medalist(s)	Harrie Lavreysen	Netherlands	X	X	
2nd place, silver medalist(s)	Nicholas Paul	Trinidad and Tobago	+0.061	+0.100	
Bronze medal race
3rd place, bronze medalist(s)	Jack Carlin	Great Britain	X	X	
4	Mateusz Rudyk	Poland	+0.030	+0.010	
