= Harry Radford =

Harry Radford may refer to:

- Harry Radford (football manager) (1851–1909), English footballer and football secretary
- Harry Radford (cyclist) (fl. 2020s), British track cyclist
