= 2021 UCI Track Cycling World Championships – Men's team sprint =

UCI Track Cycling World Championships

Men's team sprint at the 2021 UCI Track Cycling World Championships
- Venue: Vélodrome Couvert Régional Jean-Stablinski
- Location: Roubaix, France
- Dates: 20 October
- Competitors: 41 from 13 nations
- Teams: 13
- Winning time: 41.979

Medalists
gold medal	Roy van den Berg; Harrie Lavreysen; Jeffrey Hoogland	Netherlands
silver medal	Florian Grengbo; Sébastien Vigier; Rayan Helal	France
bronze medal	Nik Schröter; Stefan Bötticher; Joachim Eilers; Marc Jurczyk	Germany

The Men's team sprint competition at the 2021 UCI Track Cycling World Championships was held on 20 October 2021.

== Results ==
=== Qualifying ===
The qualifying was started at 18:52. The best eight teams advanced to the first round.

Rank	Nation	Time	Behind	Notes
1	Netherlands; Roy van den Berg; Harrie Lavreysen; Jeffrey Hoogland	42.690		Q
2	France; Florian Grengbo; Sébastien Vigier; Rayan Helal	42.965	+0.275	Q
3	Germany; Nik Schröter; Stefan Bötticher; Joachim Eilers	43.251	+0.561	Q
4	Great Britain; Alistair Fielding; Hamish Turnbull; Joseph Truman	43.467	+0.777	Q
5	Russian Cycling Federation; Ivan Gladyshev; Alexander Sharapov; Pavel Yakushevskiy	43.860	+1.170	Q
6	Poland; Mateusz Miłek; Mateusz Rudyk; Rafał Sarnecki	43.898	+1.208	Q
7	Canada; Ryan Dodyk; Nick Wammes; Hugo Barrette	43.986	+1.296	Q
8	Japan; Yuta Obara; Kohei Terasaki; Kento Yamasaki	44.414	+1.724	Q
9	Czech Republic; Matěj Bohuslávek; Dominik Topinka; Robin Wagner	44.651	+1.961	
10	Kazakhstan; Sergey Ponomaryov; Dmitriy Rezanov; Andrey Chugay	45.340	+2.650	
11	Spain; Alejandro Martínez; Juan Peralta; Ekain Jiménez	45.460	+2.770	
12	India; Jemsh Singh Keithellakpam; Rojit Singh Yanglem; Ronaldo Laitonjam	45.469	+2.779	
13	Ukraine; Mykhaylo-Yaroslav Dydko; Bohdan Danylchuk; Vladyslav Denysenko	46.135	+3.445	

=== First round ===
First round heats were held as follows:
Heat 1: 4th v 5th fastest
Heat 2: 3rd v 6th fastest
Heat 3: 2nd v 7th fastest
Heat 4: 1st v 8th fastest

The first round was started at 20:04. The heat winners were ranked on time, from which the top two advanced to the gold medal race and the other two proceeded to the bronze medal race.

Heat	Rank	Nation	Time	Behind	Notes
1	1	Russian Cycling Federation; Ivan Gladyshev; Alexander Sharapov; Pavel Yakushevskiy	43.380		QB
1	2	Great Britain; Alistair Fielding; Hamish Turnbull; Joseph Truman	43.395	+0.015	
2	1	Germany; Stefan Bötticher; Marc Jurczyk; Nik Schröter	43.300		QB
2	2	Poland; Mateusz Miłek; Daniel Rochna; Mateusz Rudyk	43.623	+0.323	
3	1	France; Florian Grengbo; Rayan Helal; Sébastien Vigier	42.467		QG
3	2	Canada; Hugo Barrette; Ryan Dodyk; Nick Wammes	43.784	+1.317	
4	1	Netherlands; Jeffrey Hoogland; Harrie Lavreysen; Roy van den Berg	42.301		QG
4	2	Japan; Yuta Obara; Kohei Terasaki; Kento Yamasaki	44.164	+1.863	

=== Finals ===
The finals were started at 20:59.

Rank	Nation	Time	Behind	Notes
Gold medal race
1st place, gold medalist(s)	Netherlands; Jeffrey Hoogland; Harrie Lavreysen; Roy van den Berg	41.979		
2nd place, silver medalist(s)	France; Florian Grengbo; Rayan Helal; Sébastien Vigier	42.550	+0.571	
Bronze medal race
3rd place, bronze medalist(s)	Germany; Stefan Bötticher; Joachim Eilers; Nik Schröter	43.141		
4	Russian Cycling Federation; Ivan Gladyshev; Alexander Sharapov; Pavel Yakushevskiy	43.717	+0.676	

== See also ==
- 2021 UCI Track Cycling World Championships – Women's team sprint
