= 2026 UEC European Track Championships – Men's sprint =

Men's sprint at the 2026 UEC Track Elite European Championships
- Venue: Konya Velodrome, Konya
- Date: 3–4 February
- Competitors: 35

Medalists
gold medal	Matthew Richardson	Great Britain
silver medal	Harrie Lavreysen	Netherlands
bronze medal	Nikita Kiriltsev

The men's sprint competition at the 2026 UEC European Track Championships was held on 3 and 4 February 2026.

== Results ==
=== Qualifying ===
The top 4 riders qualified for the 1/8 finals, 5th to 28th places qualified for the 1/16 finals.

Rank	Name	Nation	Time	Behind	Notes
1	Matthew Richardson	Great Britain	8.963		Q
2	Harrie Lavreysen	Netherlands	9.086	+0.123	Q
3	Tom Derache	France	9.366	+0.403	Q
4	Mateusz Rudyk	Poland	9.432	+0.469	Q
5	Mattia Predomo	Italy	9.443	+0.480	q
6	Nikita Kiriltsev	Individual Neutral Athletes	9.484	+0.521	q
7	Dominik Topinka	Czech Republic	9.496	+0.533	q
8	Harry Ledingham-Horn	Great Britain	9.500	+0.537	q
9	Rayan Helal	France	9.505	+0.542	q
10	Konstantinos Livanos	Greece	9.512	+0.549	q
11	Jan Pořizek	Czech Republic	9.515	+0.552	q
12	Sándor Szalontay	Hungary	9.517	+0.554	q
13	Nikita Kalachnik	Individual Neutral Athletes	9.521	+0.558	q
14	Stefano Minuta	Italy	9.524	+0.561	q
15	Lowie Nulens	Belgium	9.529	+0.566	q
16	Luca Spiegel	Germany	9.540	+0.577	q
17	Bohdan Danylchuk	Ukraine	9.561	+0.598	q
18	Loris Leneman	Netherlands	9.614	+0.651	q
19	Vasilijus Lendel	Lithuania	9.646	+0.683	q
20	Yeno Vingerhoets	Belgium	9.651	+0.688	q
21	Maximilian Dörnbach	Germany	9.652	+0.689	q
22	Tim Edvard Pettersen	Norway	9.702	+0.739	q
23	Esteban Sánchez	Spain	9.736	+0.773	q
24	Alejandro Martínez	Spain	9.765	+0.802	q
25	Aliaksandr Hlova	Individual Neutral Athletes	9.799	+0.836	q
26	Artsiom Zaitsau	Individual Neutral Athletes	9.803	+0.840	q
27	Eliasz Bednarek	Poland	9.810	+0.847	q
28	Pavel Nikolov	Bulgaria	9.858	+0.895	q
29	Eimantas Vadapalas	Lithuania	9.873	+0.910	
30	Miroslav Minchev	Bulgaria	9.922	+0.959	
31	Miltiadis Charovas	Greece	9.996	+1.033	
32	Valentyn Varharakyn	Ukraine	10.174	+1.211	
33	Bálint Csengői	Hungary	10.177	+1.214	
34	Eduard Žalar	Slovenia	10.295	+1.332	
35	Žan Lopatič	Slovenia	10.492	+1.529	

=== 1/16 finals ===
Heat winners advanced to the 1/8 finals.

Heat	Rank	Name	Nation	Time	Notes
1	1	Pavel Nikolov	Bulgaria	X	Q
1	2	Mattia Predomo	Italy	+1.251	
2	1	Nikita Kiriltsev	Individual Neutral Athletes	X	Q
2	2	Eliasz Bednarek	Poland	+0.667	
3	1	Dominik Topinka	Czech Republic	X	Q
3	2	Artsiom Zaitsau	Individual Neutral Athletes	+0.158	
4	1	Harry Ledingham-Horn	Great Britain	X	Q
4	2	Aliaksandr Hlova	Individual Neutral Athletes	+0.147	
5	1	Rayan Helal	France	X	Q
5	2	Alejandro Martínez	Spain	+1.569	
6	1	Konstantinos Livanos	Greece	X	Q
6	2	Esteban Sánchez	Spain	+0.008	
7	1	Jan Pořizek	Czech Republic	X	Q
7	2	Tim Edvard Pettersen	Norway	+0.401	
8	1	Maximilian Dörnbach	Germany	X	Q
8	2	Sándor Szalontay	Hungary	+0.076	
9	1	Nikita Kalachnik	Individual Neutral Athletes	X	Q
9	2	Yeno Vingerhoets	Belgium	+0.421	
10	1	Stefano Minuta	Italy	X	Q
10	2	Vasilijus Lendel	Lithuania	+0.062	
11	1	Lowie Nulens	Belgium	X	Q
11	2	Loris Leneman	Netherlands	+0.150	
12	1	Luca Spiegel	Germany	X	Q
12	2	Bohdan Danylchuk	Ukraine	+0.024	

=== 1/8 finals ===
Heat winners advanced to the quarterfinals.

Heat	Rank	Name	Nation	Time	Notes
1	1	Matthew Richardson	Great Britain	X	Q
1	2	Luca Spiegel	Germany	+1.031	
2	1	Harrie Lavreysen	Netherlands	X	Q
2	2	Lowie Nulens	Belgium	+0.090	
3	1	Tom Derache	France	X	Q
3	2	Stefano Minuta	Italy	+0.037	
4	1	Mateusz Rudyk	Poland	X	Q
4	2	Nikita Kalachnik	Individual Neutral Athletes	+0.049	
5	1	Maximilian Dörnbach	Germany	X	Q
5	2	Pavel Nikolov	Bulgaria	+0.185	
6	1	Nikita Kiriltsev	Individual Neutral Athletes	X	Q
6	2	Jan Pořizek	Czech Republic	+0.357	
7	1	Dominik Topinka	Czech Republic	X	Q
7	2	Konstantinos Livanos	Greece	+0.056	
8	1	Harry Ledingham-Horn	Great Britain	X	Q
8	2	Rayan Helal	France	+0.276	

=== Quarterfinals ===
Heat winners advanced to the semifinals.

Heat	Rank	Name	Nation	Race 1	Race 2	Decider (i.r.)	Notes
1	1	Matthew Richardson	Great Britain	X	X		Q
1	2	Harry Ledingham-Horn	Great Britain	+1.477	+0.295		
2	1	Harrie Lavreysen	Netherlands	X	X		Q
2	2	Dominik Topinka	Czech Republic	+0.176	+0.048		
3	1	Nikita Kiriltsev	Individual Neutral Athletes	X	X		Q
3	2	Tom Derache	France	+0.081	+0.028		
4	1	Mateusz Rudyk	Poland	X	X		Q
4	2	Maximilian Dörnbach	Germany	+0.029	+0.017		

=== Semifinals ===
Winners proceed to the gold medal final; losers proceed to the bronze medal final.

Heat	Rank	Name	Nation	Race 1	Race 2	Decider (i.r.)	Notes
1	1	Matthew Richardson	Great Britain	X	X		QG
1	2	Mateusz Rudyk	Poland	+0.356	+1.159		QB
2	1	Harrie Lavreysen	Netherlands	X	X		QG
2	2	Nikita Kiriltsev	Individual Neutral Athletes	+0.191	+0.074		QB

=== Finals ===
Rank	Name	Nation	Race 1	Race 2	Decider (i.r.)
Gold medal final
1st place, gold medalist(s)	Matthew Richardson	Great Britain	+0.039	X	X
2nd place, silver medalist(s)	Harrie Lavreysen	Netherlands	X	+0.146	+0.097
Bronze medal final
3rd place, bronze medalist(s)	Nikita Kiriltsev	Individual Neutral Athletes	X	X	
4	Mateusz Rudyk	Poland	+0.127	+0.085	
