= 2026 UEC European Track Championships – Men's team sprint =

Men's team sprint at the 2026 UEC Track Elite European Championships
- Venue: Konya Velodrome, Konya
- Date: 1 February
- Competitors: 49 from 15 nations
- Teams: 15
- Winning time: 41.789

Medalists
gold medal	Timmy Gillion; Rayan Helal; Étienne Oliviero; Tom Derache	France
silver medal	Matthew Richardson; Joseph Truman; Hamish Turnbull; Harry Radford	Great Britain
bronze medal	Matteo Bianchi; Stefano Minuta; Mattia Predomo	Italy

The Men's team sprint competition at the 2026 UEC European Track Championships was held on 1 February 2026.

== Results ==
=== Qualifying ===
The eight fastest teams advanced to the first round.

Rank	Nation	Time	Behind	Notes
1	Great Britain; Harry Radford; Joseph Truman; Matthew Richardson	42.214		Q
2	Czech Republic; Adam Rauschgold; Dominik Topinka; David Peterka	42.454	+0.240	Q
3	Italy; Stefano Minuta; Matteo Bianchi; Mattia Predomo	42.555	+0.341	Q
4	France; Timmy Gillion; Tom Derache; Étienne Oliviero	42.593	+0.379	Q
5	Germany; Nik Schröter; Luca Spiegel; Maximilian Dörnbach	43.017	+0.803	Q
6	Poland; Rafał Sarnecki; Mateusz Rudyk; Eliasz Bednarek	43.230	+1.016	Q
7	Netherlands; Roy van den Berg; Harrie Lavreysen; Loris Leneman	43.512	+1.298	Q
8	Belgium; Mathijs Verhoeven; Yeno Vingerhoets; Lowie Nulens	43.550	+1.336	Q
9	Spain; José Moreno; Alejandro Martínez; Esteban Sánchez	43.601	+1.387	
10	Hungary; Bálint Csengői; Patrik Rómeó Lovassy; Sándor Szalontay	44.051	+1.837	
11	Greece; Alexios Magklaris; Miltiadis Charovas; Konstantinos Livanos	44.181	+1.967	
12	Lithuania; Nedas Narbutas; Vasilijus Lendel; Eimantas Vadapalas	44.770	+2.556	
13	Bulgaria; Georgi Georgiev; Pavel Nikolov; Miroslav Minchev	45.208	+2.994	
14	Ukraine; Valentyn Varharakyn; Bohdan Danylchuk; Vladyslav Holiak	46.223	+4.009	
15	Slovenia; Val Žalar; Žan Lopatič; Eduard Žalar	46.731	+4.517	

=== First round ===
First round heats were held as follows:
Heat 1: 4th v 5th fastest
Heat 2: 3rd v 6th fastest
Heat 3: 2nd v 7th fastest
Heat 4: 1st v 8th fastest

The heat winners were ranked on time, from which the top 2 proceeded to the gold medal final and the other 2 proceeded to the bronze medal final.

Heat	Rank	Nation	Time	Notes
1	1	France; Rayan Helal; Étienne Oliviero; Timmy Gillion	41.986	QG
1	2	Germany; Maximilian Dörnbach; Nik Schröter; Luca Spiegel	42.679	
2	1	Italy; Matteo Bianchi; Mattia Predomo; Stefano Minuta	42.318	QB
2	2	Poland; Rafał Sarnecki; Mateusz Rudyk; Tomasz Łamaszewski	43.069	
3	1	Czech Republic; Dominik Topinka; David Peterka; Adam Rauschgold	42.271	QB
3	2	Netherlands; Roy van den Berg; Harrie Lavreysen; Loris Leneman	43.013	
4	1	Great Britain; Matthew Richardson; Joseph Truman; Harry Radford	42.052	QG
4	2	Belgium; Runar De Schrijver; Lowie Nulens; Yeno Vingerhoets	43.261	

=== Finals ===
Rank	Nation	Time	Behind	Notes
Gold medal final
1st place, gold medalist(s)	France; Timmy Gillion; Rayan Helal; Étienne Oliviero	41.789		
2nd place, silver medalist(s)	Great Britain; Matthew Richardson; Joseph Truman; Hamish Turnbull	41.795	+0.006	
Bronze medal final
3rd place, bronze medalist(s)	Italy; Matteo Bianchi; Stefano Minuta; Mattia Predomo	42.285		
4	Czech Republic; David Peterka; Adam Rauschgold; Dominik Topinka	42.393	+0.108	
