= Ashgabat Velodrome =

Velodrome in Ashgabat, Turkmenistan

Coordinates: 37.9333°N 58.3667°E

- Welotrek sport toplumy
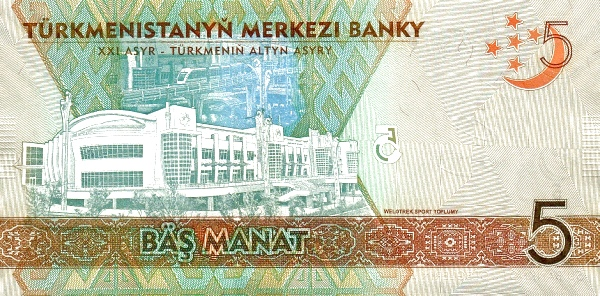
- Interactive map of Ashgabat Velodrome
- Location: Olympic village Ashgabat, Turkmenistan
- Capacity: 6,000
- Field size: 250 meter track

Construction
- Built: 2012—2014
- Opened: 2014
- Architect: Polimeks

Tenant
- Asian Indoor and Martial Arts Games (2017)

The Ashgabat Sports Complex Velodrome (Turkmen Welotrek Sport Toplumy) is a velodrome constructed in Ashgabat, Turkmenistan. It was built by Turkish construction company Polimeks for the 2017 Asian Indoor and Martial Arts Games. The track is 250 meters long and 7,1 meters wide. The construction materials used fabric from Finland. The total area of the five-storey building of 61,000 m^{2}. Rostrum accommodate up to 6000 spectators, there are VIP loggia and sector for press. Among the infrastructure facilities for athletes: massage room, sauna, restaurant for 48 people, 9 cafes at 447 locations and 13 diners rooms.

== History ==
The construction of the velodrome began in 2012 and was completed by 2014. The architect is the Turkish company Polimeks, and the facility itself was planned to be built for the AIMAG 2017. Before construction, the design of the structure changed, in particular, the tracks were lowered below the entrance level for the sake of better visibility. The cycle track also includes the offices of the National Cycling Federation of Turkmenistan. In addition, the building has a sports museum and a shop.

The cycle track has a standard length of 250 meters and a width of 7.1 meters. Materials from Finland were used for the construction of the canvas. The total area of the five-storey building is 61,000 m^{2}. The stands are designed for 6 thousand people, there are VIP and CIP-loggias and a section for the press. Among the infrastructure facilities: a massage room for athletes, a sauna, a restaurant with 48 seats, 9 cafes with 447 seats and 13 canteens.

== Notable events ==
Within the framework of the AIMAG 2017, the competition was held on the cycle track from September 18 to 22.

At the end of 2018, it became known that Ashgabat will host the 2021 UCI Track Cycling World Championships, and the track cycle will become the main subject of the competition. President of the Union Cycliste Internationale David Lappartient called the Ashgabat Velodrome "one of the most beautiful in the world" and noted that it was thanks to this structure that it was decided to grant Turkmenistan the right to host the World Track Cycling Championship in 2021.

In June 2021 the UCI announced that the championships would be moved to a different venue

== See also ==
- List of cycling tracks and velodromes
