= Florian Grengbo =

French cyclist (born 2000)

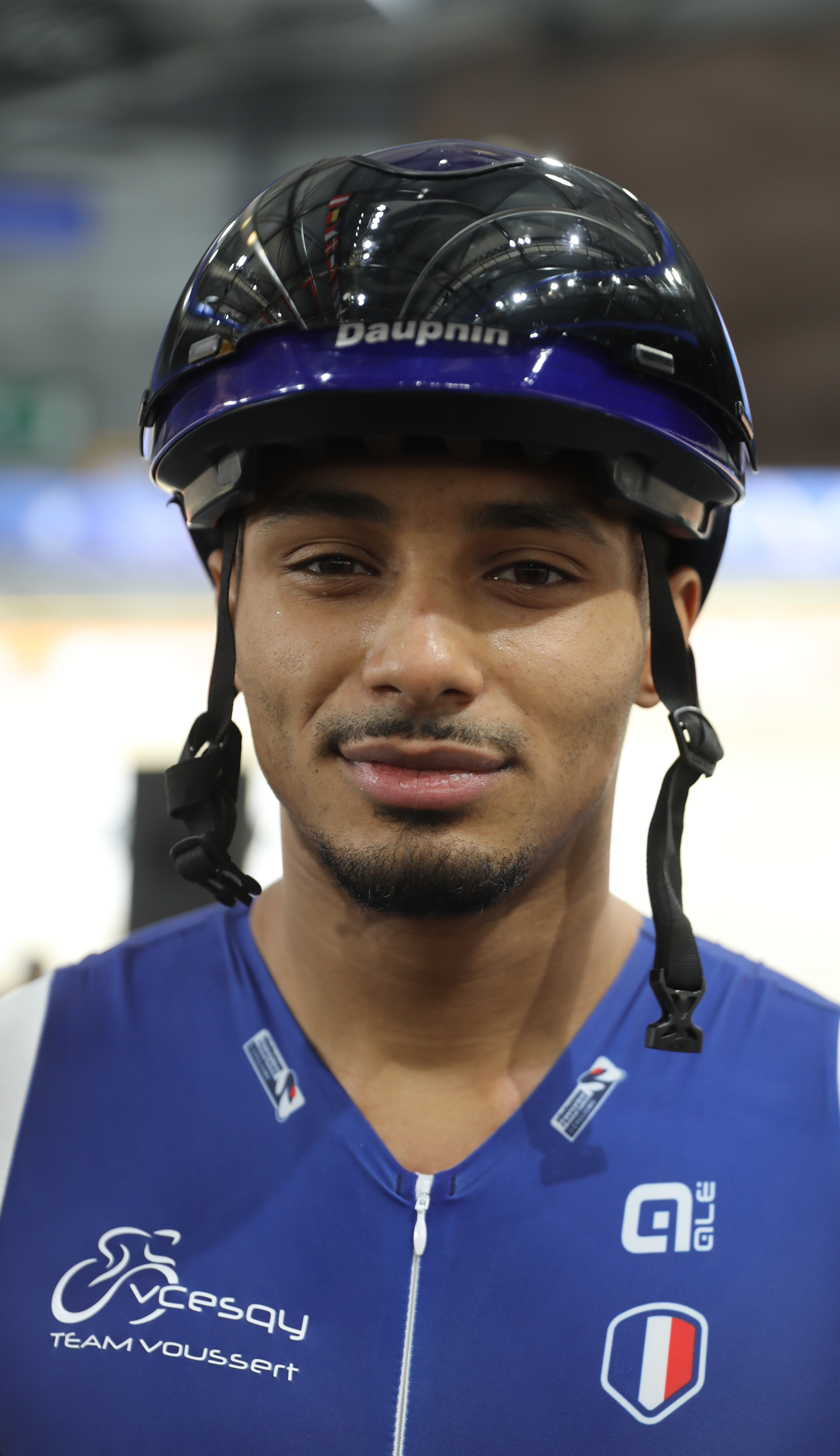
- Grengbo in 2024

Personal information
- Born: 23 August 2000 (age 26) Bourg-en-Bresse, France

Cycling career
- Sport: Cycling
- Discipline: Track
- Role: Rider
- Rider type: Sprinter
Medal record
Men's track cycling
Representing France
Olympic Games
Bronze medal – third place	2020 Tokyo	Team sprint
World Championships
Silver medal – second place	2021 Roubaix	Team sprint
Bronze medal – third place	2023 Glasgow	Team sprint
European Championships
Silver medal – second place	2024 Apeldoorn	Team sprint

Florian Grengbo (born 23 August 2000) is a French track cyclist.

A sprinter, in 2016 he was the French junior team sprint champion, a title he retained in 2017 as well as gaining two bronze medals in the individual sprint and in the keirin at the national championships.

At the 2018 UCI Junior Track Cycling World Championships, he won the team sprint for France alongside Vincent Yon and Titouan Renvoise. At the 2018 European Junior Championships, he was again part of a victorious French team; this time with Rayan Helal and Melvin Landerneau. He also won the keirin, and finished second in the sprint.

In June 2021, he was named to the team sprint event at the 2020 Summer Olympics alongside Helal and Sébastien Vigier.

== Major results ==
2016
1st Team sprint, National Junior Track Championships (with Rayan Helal & Lucas Ronat)
2017
National Junior Track Championships

1st Team sprint (with Rayan Helal & Nicolas Verne)
3rd Individual sprint
3rd Keirin

2018
1st Team sprint, UCI Junior World Championships
UEC European Junior Championships

1st Keirin
2nd Sprint

2020
UCI World Cup

1st Team sprint, Milton
