= Hayden Norris =

English cyclist (born 2002)

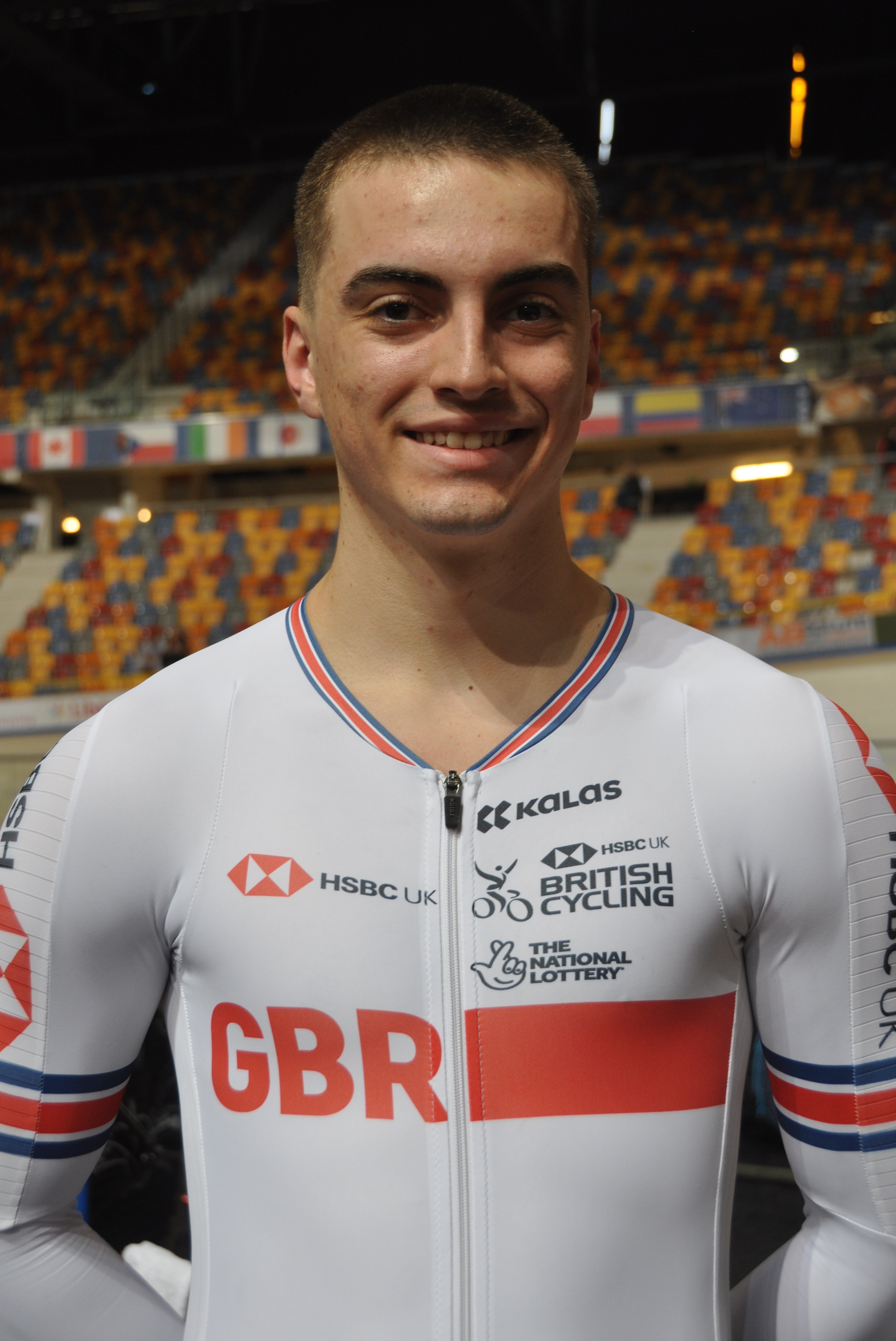
- Norris in 2021

Personal information
- Nationality: British (English)
- Born: 21 August 2002 (age 23) Stafford, Staffordshire, England

Sport
- Country: Great Britain, England
- Sport: Cycling
- Event(s): Sprint, Keirin, Time trial
Medal record
Men's track cycling
Representing Great Britain
European Championships
Bronze medal – third place	2025 Heusden-Zolder	Team sprint

Hayden Norris (born 21 August 2002) is an English cyclist. He has represented England at the Commonwealth Games.

== Biography ==
Norris has been riding since the age of 13 and won the 2021 European Under-23 Championships gold medal in the sprint. He won the silver medal in the team sprint at the 2022 British National Track Championships, a year after winning bronze in the same event.

In 2022, he was selected for the 2022 Commonwealth Games in Birmingham. He competed in three events; the men's sprint event where he finished in 19th place, the men's keirin event and the men's 1 km time trial.

In 2024, he won the national Keirin title and Team sprint titles, at the 2024 British Cycling National Track Championships.

On 7 October 2024 it was announced that Norris would make his elite debut as part of the Great Britain squad competing at the 2024 UCI Track Cycling World Championships.

== Major results ==
2020
National Track Championships

3rd Team sprint (with Harry Ledingham-Horn and Ed Lowe)

2021
UEC European U23 Championships

1st Team sprint (with Alistair Fielding, Hamish Turnbull and James Bunting)
2nd 1km time trial

2022
National Track Championships

2nd Team sprint (with James Bunting, Marcus Hiley and Harry Ledingham-Horn)

UEC European U23 Championships

1st Team sprint (with James Bunting and Marcus Hiley)
3rd 1km time trial

2023
National Track Championships

2nd Team sprint (with Oliver Aloul, James Bunting and Matt Rotherham)

UEC European U23 Championships

3rd Sprint

2024
National Track Championships

1st Keirin
1st Team sprint (with Ed Lowe and Harry Ledingham-Horn)

UEC European U23 Championships

1st 1km time trial
2nd Sprint
2nd Team sprint (with Harry Ledingham-Horn and Marcus Hiley)

2025
National Track Championships

3rd Team sprint (with Alistair Fielding, Harry Radford and Hamish Turnbull

UEC European Championships

3rd Team sprint (with Harry Ledingham-Horn and Harry Radford)
