= Cycling at the 2022 Commonwealth Games – Men's 1 km time trial =

Cycling Track – Men's 1 km time trial at the 2022 Commonwealth Games
- Venue: Lee Valley VeloPark
- Dates: 1 August
- Competitors: 20 from 11 nations
- Winning time: 59.505

Medalists
gold medal	Matthew Glaetzer	Australia
silver medal	Thomas Cornish	Australia
bronze medal	Nicholas Paul	Trinidad and Tobago

The men's 1 km time trial at the 2022 Commonwealth Games was part of the cycling programme, which took place on 1 August 2022.

== Records ==
Prior to this competition, the existing world and Games records were as follows:

World record	François Pervis (FRA)	56.303	Aguascalientes, Mexico	7 December 2013
Games record	Matthew Glaetzer (AUS)	59.340	Brisbane, Australia	8 April 2018

== Results ==
Rank	Rider	Time	Behind	Notes
1st place, gold medalist(s)	Matthew Glaetzer (AUS)	59.505	—	
2nd place, silver medalist(s)	Thomas Cornish (AUS)	1:00.036	+0.531	
3rd place, bronze medalist(s)	Nicholas Paul (TTO)	1:00.089	+0.584	
4	Matthew Richardson (AUS)	1:00.152	+0.647	
5	Nick Kergozou (NZL)	1:01.076	+1.571	
6	Hayden Norris (ENG)	1:01.285	+1.780	
7	Ethan Vernon (ENG)	1:01.418	+1.913	
8	Joe Holt (WAL)	1:01.422	+1.917	
9	Nick Wammes (CAN)	1:01.443	+1.938	
10	Muhammad Fadhil Mohd Zonis (MAS)	1:01.734	+2.229	
11	Ryan Dodyk (CAN)	1:01.786	+2.281	
12	Ronaldo Laitonjam (IND)	1:02.500	+2.995	
13	Harvey McNaughton (WAL)	1:02.659	+3.154	
14	Muhammad Ridwan Sahrom (MAS)	1:03.093	+3.588	
15	Riley Pickrell (CAN)	1:03.627	+4.122	
16	Rhys Pilley (JEY)	1:05.630	+6.125	
17	Daniel Palmer (JAM)	1:11.307	+11.802	
18	Malik Reid (JAM)	1:11.944	+12.439	
19	Zoe Bold (JAM)	1:13.681	+14.176	
20	Emmanuel Sackey (GHA)	1:20.526	+21.021	
	Joseph Truman (ENG)	Did not start		
	Jonny Wale (SCO)	Did not start		
