= 2024 UEC European Track Championships – Men's 1 km time trial =

Men's 1 km time trial at the 2024 UEC European Track Championships
- Venue: Omnisport Apeldoorn, Apeldoorn
- Date: 11 January
- Competitors: 18 from 13 nations
- Winning time: 1:00.272

Medalists
gold medal	Matteo Bianchi	Italy
silver medal	Daan Kool	Netherlands
bronze medal	Melvin Landerneau	France

The men's 1 km time trial competition at the 2024 UEC European Track Championships was held on 11 January 2024.

== Results ==
=== Qualifying ===
The top 8 riders qualified for the final.

Rank	Name	Nation	Time	Behind	Notes
1	Matteo Bianchi	Italy	59.687		Q
2	Joseph Truman	Great Britain	59.927	+0.240	Q
3	Maximilian Dörnbach	Germany	1:00.238	+0.551	Q
4	Daan Kool	Netherlands	1:00.345	+0.658	Q
5	Melvin Landerneau	France	1:00.358	+0.671	Q
6	Alejandro Martínez	Spain	1:00.454	+0.767	Q
7	Marc Jurczyk	Germany	1:01.586	+1.899	Q
8	Tijmen van Loon	Netherlands	1:01.659	+1.972	Q
9	Jakub Malášek	Czech Republic	1:01.670	+1.983	
10	Ekain Jiménez	Spain	1:01.961	+2.274	
11	Matěj Hytych	Czech Republic	1:01.980	+2.293	
12	Eliasz Bednarek	Poland	1:02.031	+2.344	
13	Niccolò Galli	Italy	1:02.132	+2.445	
14	Frederik Madsen	Denmark	1:03.550	+3.863	
15	Rodrigo Caixas	Portugal	1:03.896	+4.209	
16	Christoffer Eriksson	Sweden	1:05.218	+5.531	
17	Valentyn Varharakyn	Ukraine	1:06.664	+6.281	
18	Eduard Žalar	Slovenia	1:05.968	+6.977	

=== Final ===
Rank	Name	Nation	Time	Behind	Notes
1st place, gold medalist(s)	Matteo Bianchi	Italy	1:00.272		
2nd place, silver medalist(s)	Daan Kool	Netherlands	1:00.414	+0.142	
3rd place, bronze medalist(s)	Melvin Landerneau	France	1:00.472	+0.200	
4	Joseph Truman	Great Britain	1:00.509	+0.237	
5	Maximilian Dörnbach	Germany	1:00.675	+0.403	
6	Alejandro Martínez	Spain	1:00.774	+0.502	
7	Tijmen van Loon	Netherlands	1:01.776	+1.504	
8	Marc Jurczyk	Germany	1:02.235	+1.963	
