= Loris Leneman =

Dutch cyclist

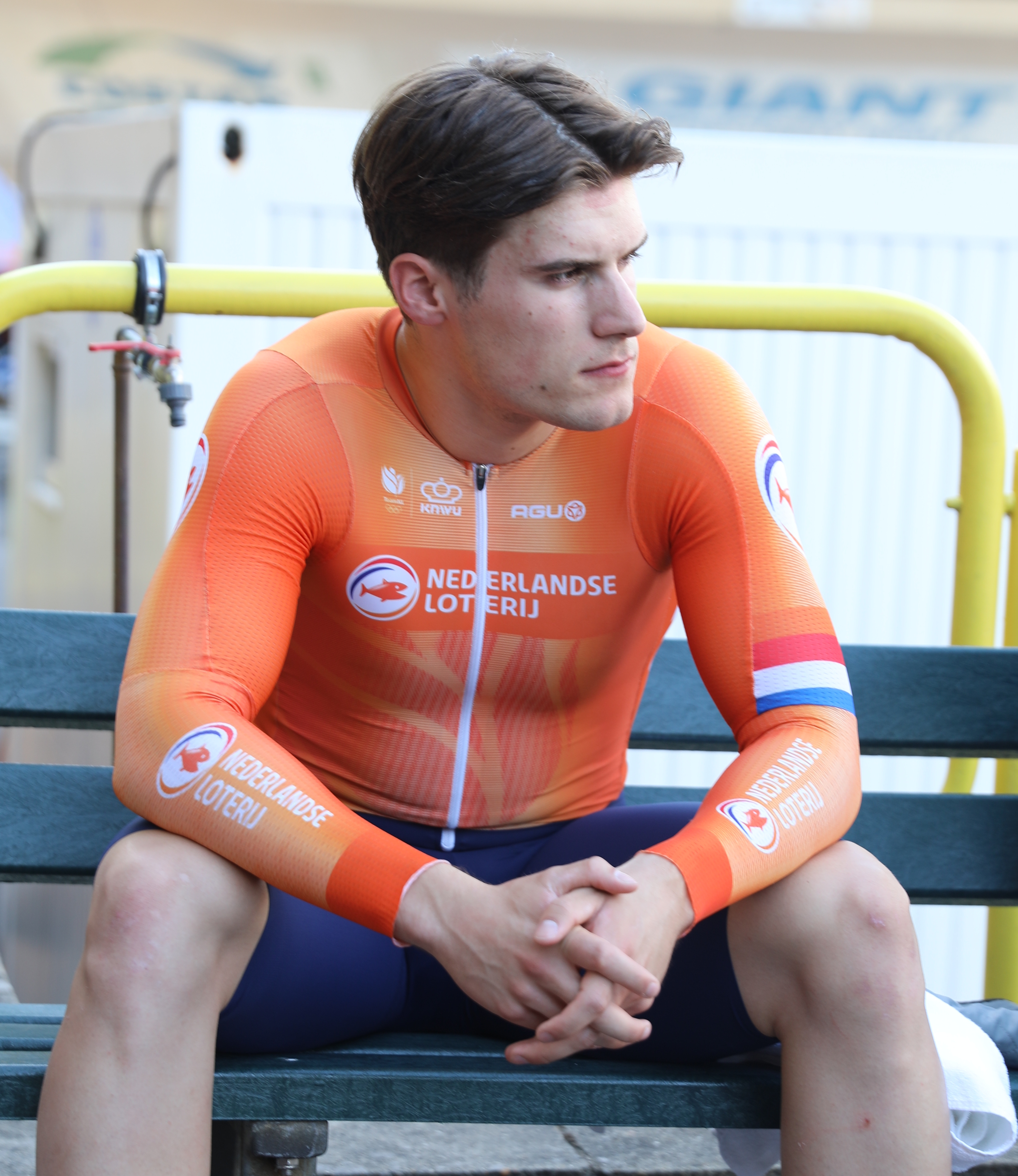
- Leneman in 2024

Personal information
- Nationality: Dutch

Sport
- Country: Netherlands
- Sport: Cycling
- Event: Sprint
Medal record
Men's track cycling
Representing Netherlands
European Championships
Silver medal – second place	2025 Heusden-Zolder	Team sprint

Loris Leneman is a Dutch track cyclist. He was a silver medalist at the 2025 UEC European Track Championships.

== Career ==
From Varsseveld, he has said one of his cycling heroes when he was growing up was Robert Gesink. He won a silver medal at the 2023 European U23 Championships in the team sprint with Daan Kool and Tijmen van Loon, in Portugal.

He made his senior debut for the Netherlands at the 2025 European Track Cycling Championships. He won a silver medal in the team sprint alongside Harrie Lavreysen and Tijmen van Loon.
