= Phylecia Armstrong =

Trinidad and Tobago volleyball player (born 1984)

Personal information
- Nickname: Phyl
- Born: 10 April 1992 (age 34); Trinidad and Tobago
- Hometown: Tacarigua
- Height: 185 cm (73 in)
- Weight: 72 kg (159 lb)
- Spike: 289 cm (114 in)
- Block: 282 cm (111 in)
- Education: Bethune-Cookman University

Volleyball information
- Position: middle blocker
- Number: 11 (national team)

National team
2011	Trinidad and Tobago

Phylecia Armstrong (born 10 April 1992) is a national Trinidad and Tobago female volleyball player. She was part of the Trinidad and Tobago women's national volleyball team and is currently playing beach volleyball.

She participated at the 2011 Women's Pan-American Volleyball Cup.
