= Jenna Ross =

Environmental scientist and researcher

- Born: Tarland
- Education: University of Aberdeen; Robert Gordon University
- Scientific career
- Thesis: Diversity and mass production of slug-parasitic nematodes (2010)

Dr. Jenna Ross OBE is a Scottish environmental scientist and agricultural researcher at the agri-tech centre Crop Health and Protection. She serves as the director of the Oxford Farming Conference. She was named an Officer of the Order of the British Empire in the Queen’s Platinum Jubilee Honours.

== Early life and education ==
Dr. Ross grew up in Tarland on a family farm. As a child she collected slugs from turnip fields, and saw the impact that slugs had on farmers' livelihoods. She attended Aboyne Academy. Her parents, grandparents and great grandparents were all farmers. She was an undergraduate student at Robert Gordon University where she specialised in forensic sciences. She then worked for Grampian Police as a scene of crime officer.

Dr. Ross' doctoral research considered the development of biological control agents for slugs and snails. Slugs pose the biggest threat to cereal and oilseed production, and are estimated to cost the UK farming industry £100 million a year. Dr. Ross developed her expertise in malacology during a 26-week tour of the world. Based on these investigations, Dr. Ross wrote a report outlining emerging pest management techniques. Her research uncovered that over half of the UK slug species are exotic, and that slugs can have both an economic impact (due to crop damage) and an impact on human health. She advised the government to develop biosecurity protocols to protect UK agriculture and employed an eradication protocol for the spanish slug. After completing her doctorate, Dr. Ross held various positions in sustainable agriculture companies, including Bioforsk.

== Career ==
Dr. Ross is focussed on improving sustainability and resilience in agriculture. She is responsible for international development at the agri-tech centre Crop Health and Protection, where she has sought to control slugs and snails using natural enemies. She returned to the Robert Gordon University to complete an MBA, during which she was awarded the Land-based Aquaculture Higher Education Learner of the Year award and the Council for Awards of Royal Agricultural Societies award.

Dr. Ross was named an Officer of the Order of the British Empire in the Queen’s Platinum Jubilee Honours. After the death of Queen Elizabeth II, Ross decorated commemorative hay bales.

== Awards and honours ==
- 2018 Land-based Aquaculture Higher Education Learner of the Year Award
- 2019 35 Under 35 Award
- 2020 Farmers Club Educator Award
- 2022 Elected Officer of the Order of the British Empire in Queen’s Platinum Jubilee Honours
