= Harry Radford (football manager) =

English football manager (1851–1909)

Harry Skevington Radford (January or February 1851 – 25 January 1909) was an English footballer and football secretary, who was heavily involved with Nottingham Forest. He was one of their first players upon the club's formation in 1865, before later becoming its secretary and helping them adopt professionalism in 1889. Outside of Nottingham Forest, he was involved in the merger between the Football League and Football Alliance in 1892.

== Career ==
Radford began as a player at Nottingham Forest, and was one of the club's earliest players, playing for them until at least 1872. Following his retirement, he became the president of Notts Swifts by 1882. He later returned to Nottingham Forest, helping it adopt professionalism in 1889, and later being appointed as the club's secretary in August 1889. As secretary, he helped the club win the 1891–92 Football Alliance, which secured them a spot in the 1892–93 Football League First Division when the Football League and Football Alliance merged, which he helped facilitate.

Shortly after the merger, he was elected to the Football League's management committee, and was promoted to vice-president following the retirement of Wolverhampton Wanderers's T. H. Sidney. He also served as a representative for Nottinghamshire in The Football Association, and served on their financial committee between August 1903 and July 1906. Additionally, he served as the vice-president of the Nottinghamshire County Football Association until 1904, He also served on the Midland Football League's appeal committee until 1906.

In August 1898, Radford was elected to the Football Association's international selection committee.

== Personal life ==
Radford had six children, with one of his sons, Robert, being a famous bass singer. He died in West Bridgford on 25 January 1909, around a week before his 59th birthday, following a battle with an illness.

== Honours ==
Nottingham Forest

- Football Alliance Champions: 1891–92
