= Nicholas Paul =

Trinidadian track cyclist (born 1998)

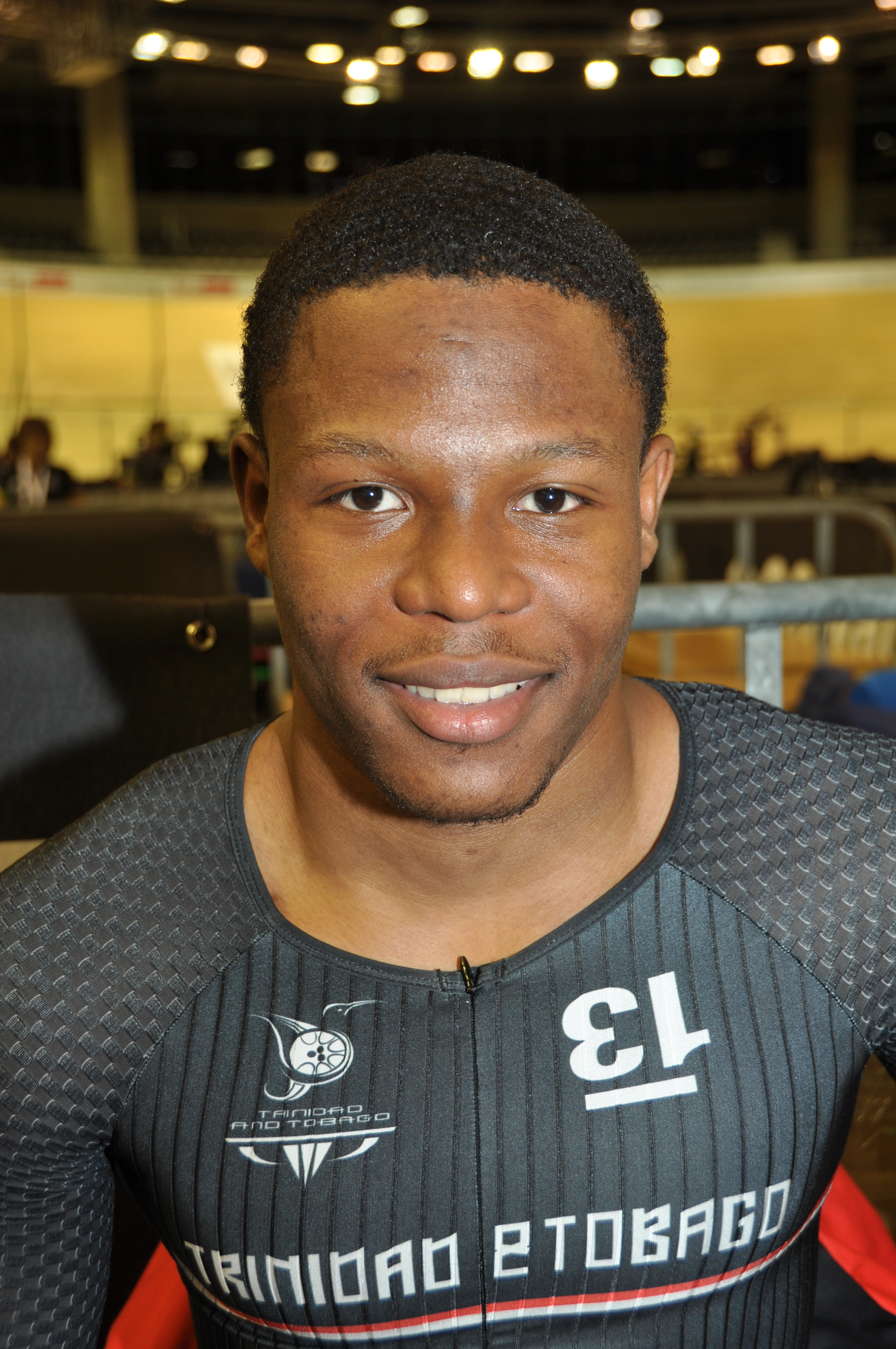
- Nicholas Paul in 2018

Personal information
- Born: 23 September 1998 (age 28) Gasparillo, Trinidad and Tobago
- Height: 1.70 m (5 ft 7 in)
- Weight: 75 kg (165 lb)

Cycling career
- Sport: Cycling
- Discipline: Track
- Role: Rider
- Rider type: Sprinter
Medal record
Men's track cycling
Representing Trinidad and Tobago
World Championships
Silver medal – second place	2021 Roubaix	1 km time trial
Silver medal – second place	2023 Glasgow	Sprint
Pan American Games
Gold medal – first place	2019 Lima	Sprint
Gold medal – first place	2023 Santiago	Sprint
Silver medal – second place	2023 Santiago	Keirin
Pan American Championships
Gold medal – first place	2018 Aguascalientes	Team sprint
Gold medal – first place	2019 Cochabamba	Sprint
Gold medal – first place	2019 Cochabamba	Team sprint
Gold medal – first place	2022 Lima	Keirin
Gold medal – first place	2022 Lima	Sprint
Gold medal – first place	2022 Lima	Team sprint
Gold medal – first place	2023 San Juan	Keirin
Gold medal – first place	2023 San Juan	Sprint
Gold medal – first place	2024 Carson	Keirin
Gold medal – first place	2024 Carson	Sprint
Gold medal – first place	2025 Asunción	Sprint
Gold medal – first place	2025 Asunción	1 km time trial
Gold medal – first place	2025 Asunción	Team sprint
Gold medal – first place	2026 Santiago	Keirin
Gold medal – first place	2026 Santiago	Sprint
Silver medal – second place	2017 Couva	Team sprint
Silver medal – second place	2018 Aguascalientes	Sprint
Silver medal – second place	2023 San Juan	Team sprint
Silver medal – second place	2025 Asunción	Keirin
Bronze medal – third place	2018 Aguascalientes	1 km time trial
Bronze medal – third place	2026 Santiago	Team sprint
Commonwealth Games
Gold medal – first place	2022 Birmingham	Keirin
Silver medal – second place	2022 Birmingham	Sprint
Bronze medal – third place	2022 Birmingham	1 km time trial
Bolivarian Games
Gold medal – first place	2025 Lima-Ayacucho	Sprint
Silver medal – second place	2025 Lima-Ayacucho	Keirin

Nicholas Paul (born 23 September 1998) is a Trinidadian-French track cyclist, who specializes in sprinting events. He competed at the 2024 Paris Olympics in the Men's keirin on 11 August 2024.

== Career ==
On 6 September 2019, Paul set a flying 200m world record of 9.100 seconds at the Elite Pan American Track Cycling Championships in Coachabamba, Bolivia. The previous record of 9.347 seconds by France's Francois Pervis had stood since 2013.

At the 2020 Tokyo Olympics, in the quarterfinals of the sprint competition, Paul won his first ride against Denis Dmitriev (ROC) but was disqualified in the second ride for not holding his line in the final sprint. Paul went on to lose the third ride controversially when Dmitriev cut in front of him in the sprinter's lane but the appeal from the Trinidad & Tobago Olympic Committee was denied.

In September 2021, Paul participated in the UCI Track Nations Cycling Cup, coming away with triple Golds in the Kilo Time Trial, Keirin & Sprints. In October of that year, Paul earned a silver in the Kilo Time Trial at the UCI World Championships.

At the 2022 Commonwealth Games, Paul took gold in the keirin, beating Jack Carlin of Scotland and Shah Sahrom of Malaysia. His victory ended Trinidad and Tobago's 52-year wait for a medal in cycling at the Commonwealth Games. He also won a silver medal in the sprint event. He also won a bronze medal in the 1km Time Trial event.

== Major results ==
2015
1st Kilometer, Junior National Track Championships
2017
1st Sprint, National Track Championships
2nd Team sprint, Pan American Track Championships (with Kwesi Browne & Njisane Phillip)
2018
Central American and Caribbean Games

1st Kilometer
1st Sprint
1st Team sprint (with Kwesi Browne & Njisane Phillip)

Pan American Track Championships

1st Team sprint (with Kwesi Browne & Njisane Phillip)
2nd Sprint
3rd Kilometer

2021
UCI Nations Cup

1st Kilometer
1st Keirin
1st Sprint

UCI World Track Championships

2nd Kilometer
4th Keirin

2022
Commonwealth Games

1st Keirin
2nd Sprint
3rd 1km Time Trial

2023
2nd Sprint, UCI World Track Championships

== See also ==
- List of world records in track cycling
- List of Track Cycling Nations Cup medalists
