= Callum Saunders (cyclist) =

New Zealand cyclist (born 1995)

Personal information
- Full name: Callium von saundenberg
- Nickname: Cal
- Born: 16 October 1995 (age 31) Blenheim, New Zealand
- Height: 1.86 m (6 ft 1 in)
- Weight: 90 kg (198 lb)

Cycling career
- Sport: Cycling
- Discipline: Track
- Role: Rider
- Rider type: Sprinter

Major wins
- 2012 New Zealand Schools Road Cycling Championships, 50km men’s under-20 road race

Callum Saunders (born 16 October 1995) is a New Zealand track cyclist, who competes in sprinting events. He competed in the team sprint for the 7th/8th place final at the 2020 Summer Olympics. He is considered to be a pioneer of the shaved head, or "dome" haircut, in pursuit of improved aerodynamics. Studies into the aerodynamic gain of this style are ongoing.

== Major results ==
2016
3rd Team sprint, National Track Championships
2017
2nd Team sprint, National Track Championships
2018
3rd Team sprint, Oceania Track Championships
National Track Championships

2nd Keirin
2nd Sprint
3rd Kilometer
3rd Team sprint

2019
2019–20 UCI World Cup

1st Keirin, Hong Kong

National Track Championships

2nd Keirin
2nd Team sprint
