= Daan Kool =

Dutch cyclist (born 2001)

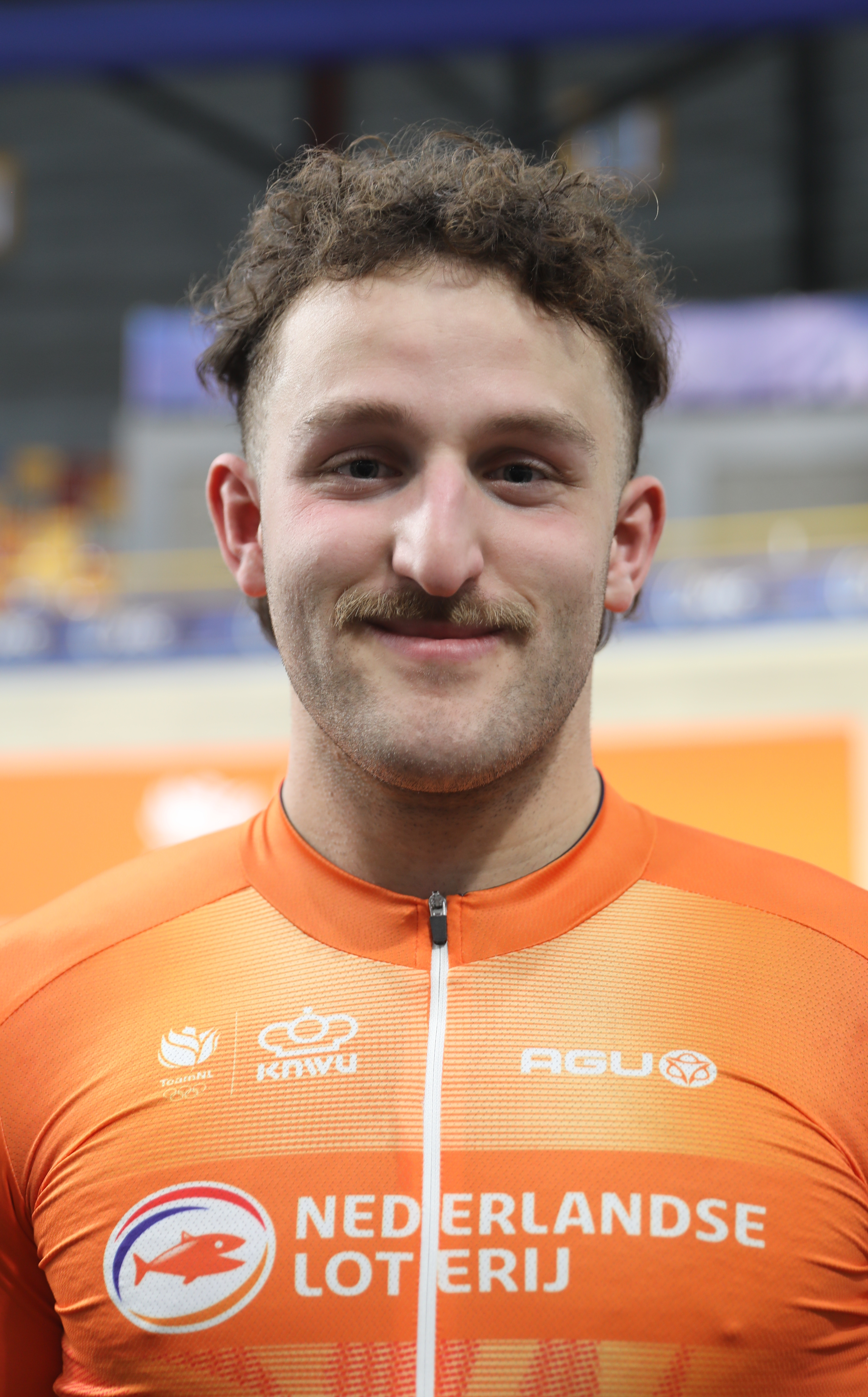
- Kool in 2024

Personal information
- Born: 12 May 2001 (age 25) Zevenhoven, Nieuwkoop, Netherlands

Cycling career
- Sport: Cycling
- Discipline: Track
- Role: Rider
- Rider type: Sprinter
Medal record
Men's track cycling
Representing the Netherlands
European Championships
Silver medal – second place	2024 Apeldoorn	1 km time trial

Daan Kool (born 12 May 2001) is a Dutch track cyclist, who competes in sprinting events.

Kool originally competed in speed skating, before taking up cycling to aid in training. He soon became successful in cycling as well, winning the 1 km time trial at the 2018 National Junior Track Championships, and two medals at the 2019 UCI Junior Track Cycling World Championships. He won the keirin at the UEC European Under-23 Championships in 2021, and a silver medal in the 1 km time trial at the 2024 UEC European Track Championships.

== Major results ==
2018
1st Kilo, National Junior Championships
2019
UCI World Junior Championships

2nd Kilo
3rd Individual sprint

UEC European Junior Championships

2nd Kilo
3rd Keirin
3rd Individual sprint
3rd Team sprint

2020
2nd Keirin, UEC European Under-23 Championships
2021
1st Keirin, UEC European Under-23 Championships
2023
UEC European Under-23 Championships

2nd Team sprint
3rd Kilo

2024
2nd Kilo, UEC European Championships
