= Thomas Cornish =

Australian cyclist (born 2000)

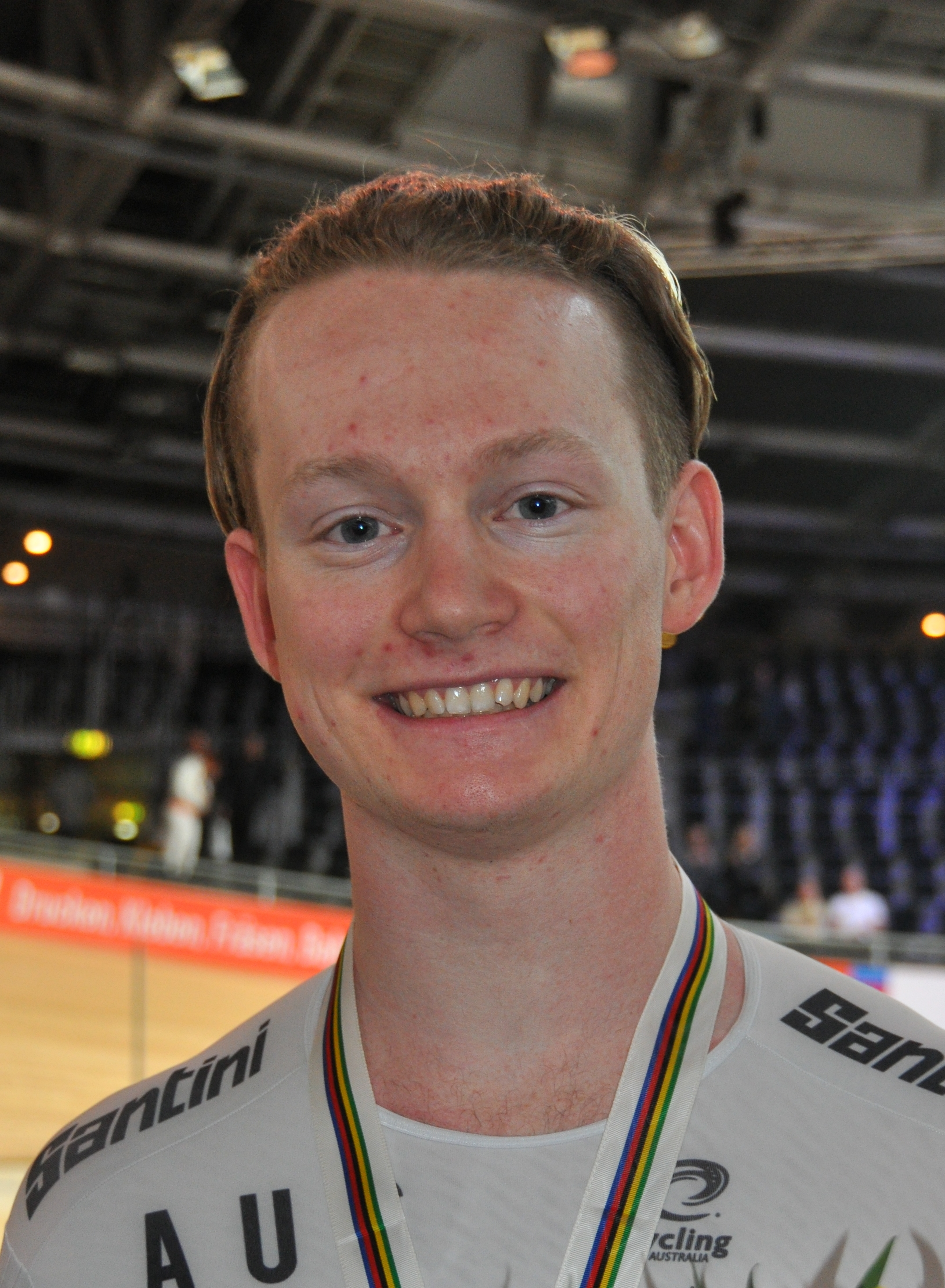
- Cornish in 2020

Personal information
- Born: 15 February 2000 (age 26) Sydney, Australia

Cycling career
- Sport: Cycling
- Current team: Australian Cycling Team
- Discipline: Track
- Role: Rider
- Rider type: Track sprinter
Medal record
Men's track cycling
Representing Australia
World Championships
Gold medal – first place	2022 Saint-Quentin-en-Yvelines	Team sprint
Silver medal – second place	2023 Glasgow	Team sprint
Silver medal – second place	2024 Ballerup	Team sprint
Bronze medal – third place	2020 Berlin	Team sprint
Bronze medal – third place	2023 Glasgow	1 km time trial
Commonwealth Games
Silver medal – second place	2022 Birmingham	1 km time trial

Thomas Cornish (born 15 February 2000) is an Australian track cyclist. He won a silver medal in the 1 km time trial at the 2020 UCI Track Cycling World Championships. He also competed at the 2022 Commonwealth Games in the 1 km time trial, where he won a silver medal, and in the sprint event.
