= Nik Schröter =

German cyclist (born 1998)

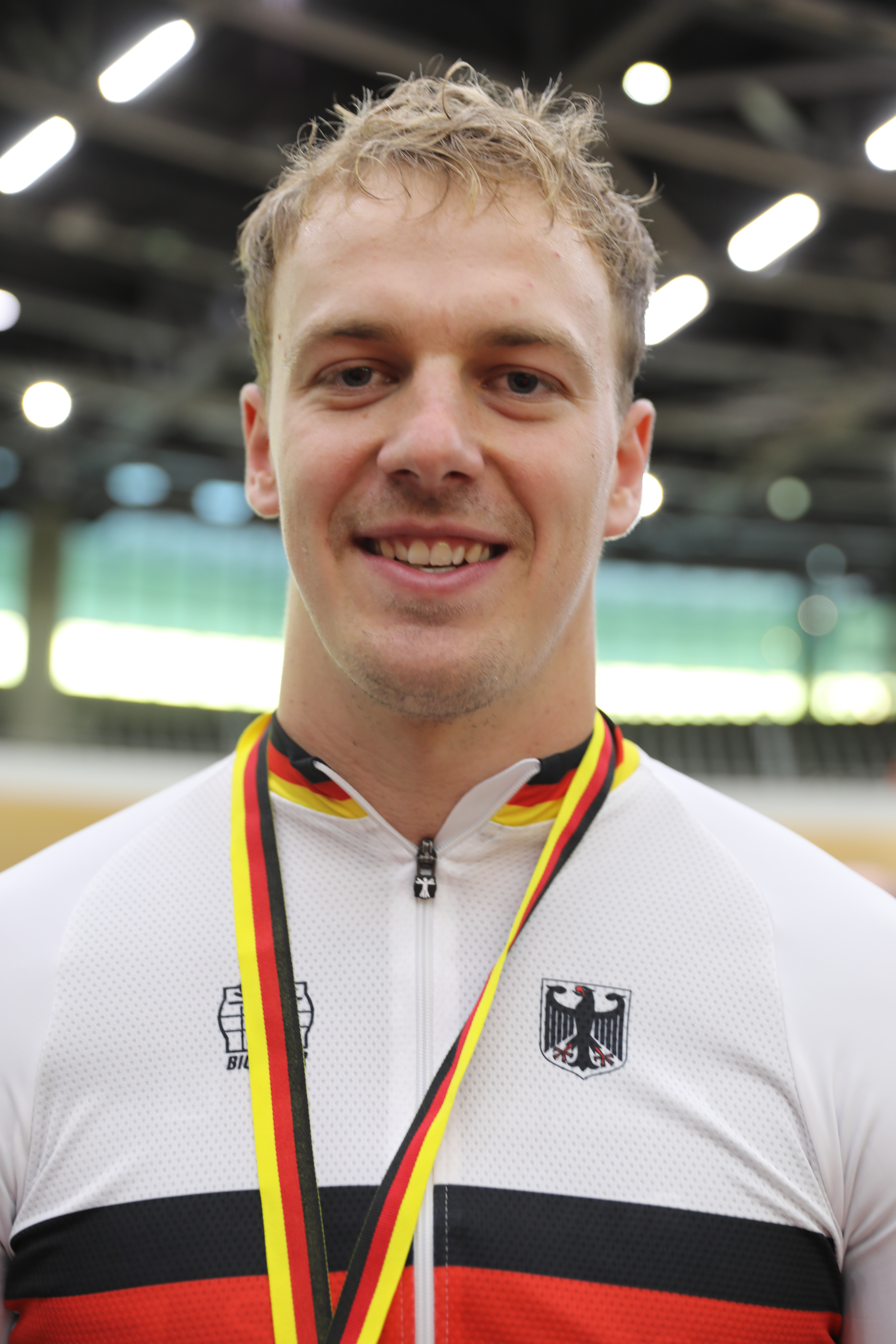
- Schröter in 2024

Personal information
- Born: 12 June 1998 (age 28) Finsterwalde, Germany

Cycling career
- Sport: Cycling
- Current team: Team TheedProjekt-Cycling
- Discipline: Track
- Role: Rider
- Rider type: Sprinter

Amateur teams
- 2006–2010: RSV Finsterwalde
- 2011–2018: RSC Cottbus
Medal record
Men's track cycling
Representing Germany
World Championships
Bronze medal – third place	2021 Roubaix	Team sprint
World Junior Championships
Bronze medal – third place	2016 Aigle	Team sprint

Nik Schröter (born 12 June 1998) is a German track cyclist. At the 2021 UCI Track Cycling World Championships, he won a bronze medal in the team sprint event.
