= Stefano Minuta =

Italian cyclist (born 2004)

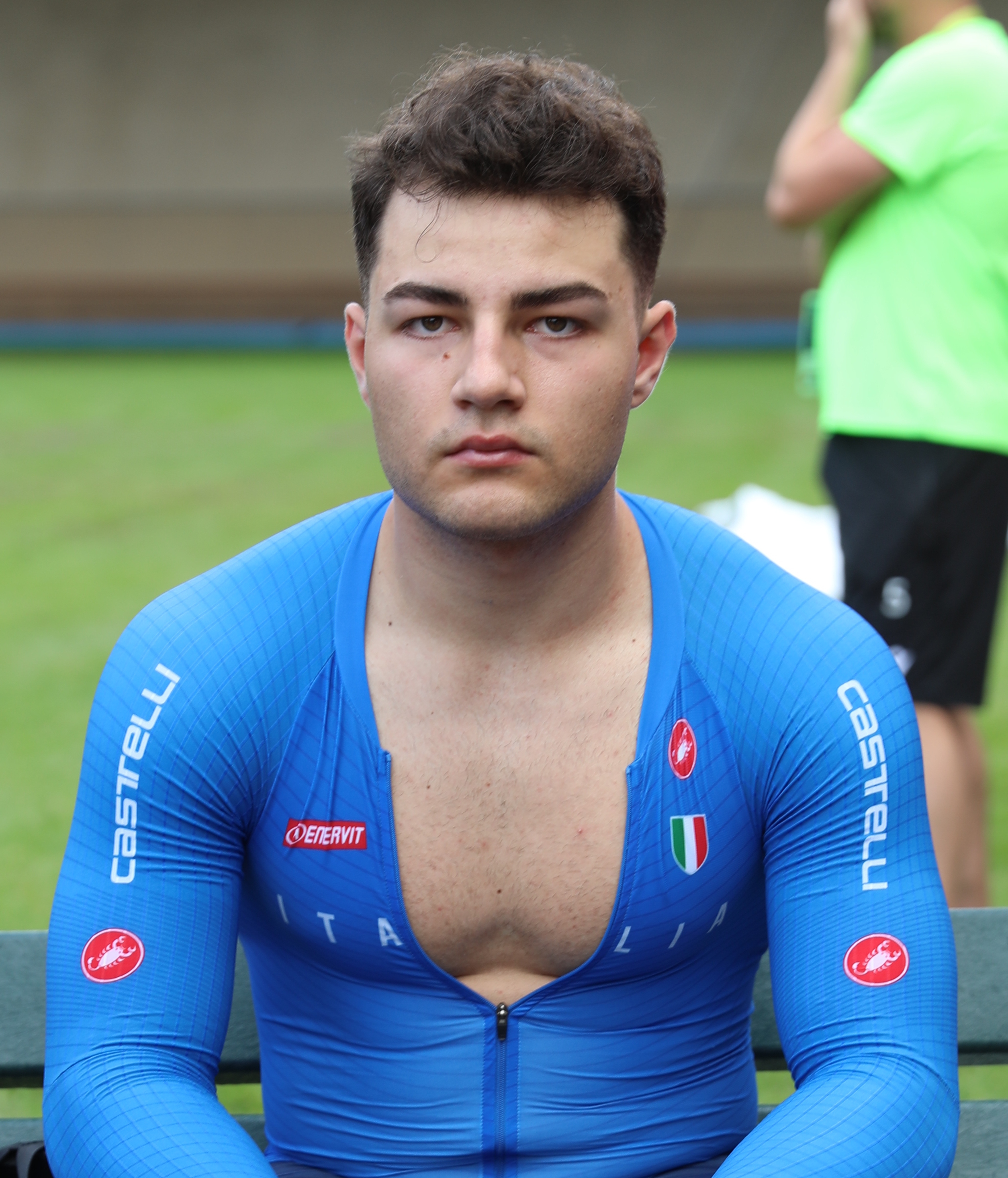
- Minuta in 2024

Personal information
- Born: 27 June 2004 (age 22)

Cycling career
- Sport: Cycling
- Discipline: Track
- Role: Rider
- Rider type: Sprinter

Amateur team
- 2021–2022: GB Junior Team
Medal record
Men's track cycling
Representing Italy
European Championships
Bronze medal – third place	2026 Konya	Team sprint

Stefano Minuta (born 27 June 2004) is an Italian track cyclist, who specializes in sprint events. He won a bronze medal in the team sprint at the 2026 UEC European Track Championships, setting a national record in the process.
