= Quincy Alexander =

Trinidad and Tobago cyclist

Personal information
- Born: 29 December 1993 (age 32)

Cycling career
- Sport: Cycling
- Discipline: Track cycling
- Role: Rider
- Rider type: sprinter
Medal record
Men's track cycling
Representing Trinidad and Tobago
Pan American Championships
Silver medal – second place	2023 San Juan	Team sprint
Bronze medal – third place	2017 Couva	1 km time trial

Quincy Alexander (born 29 December 1993) is a Trinidad and Tobago male track cyclist. He competed in the 3 events at the 2012 UCI Track Cycling World Championships.
