= Harry Radford (cyclist) =

British cyclist

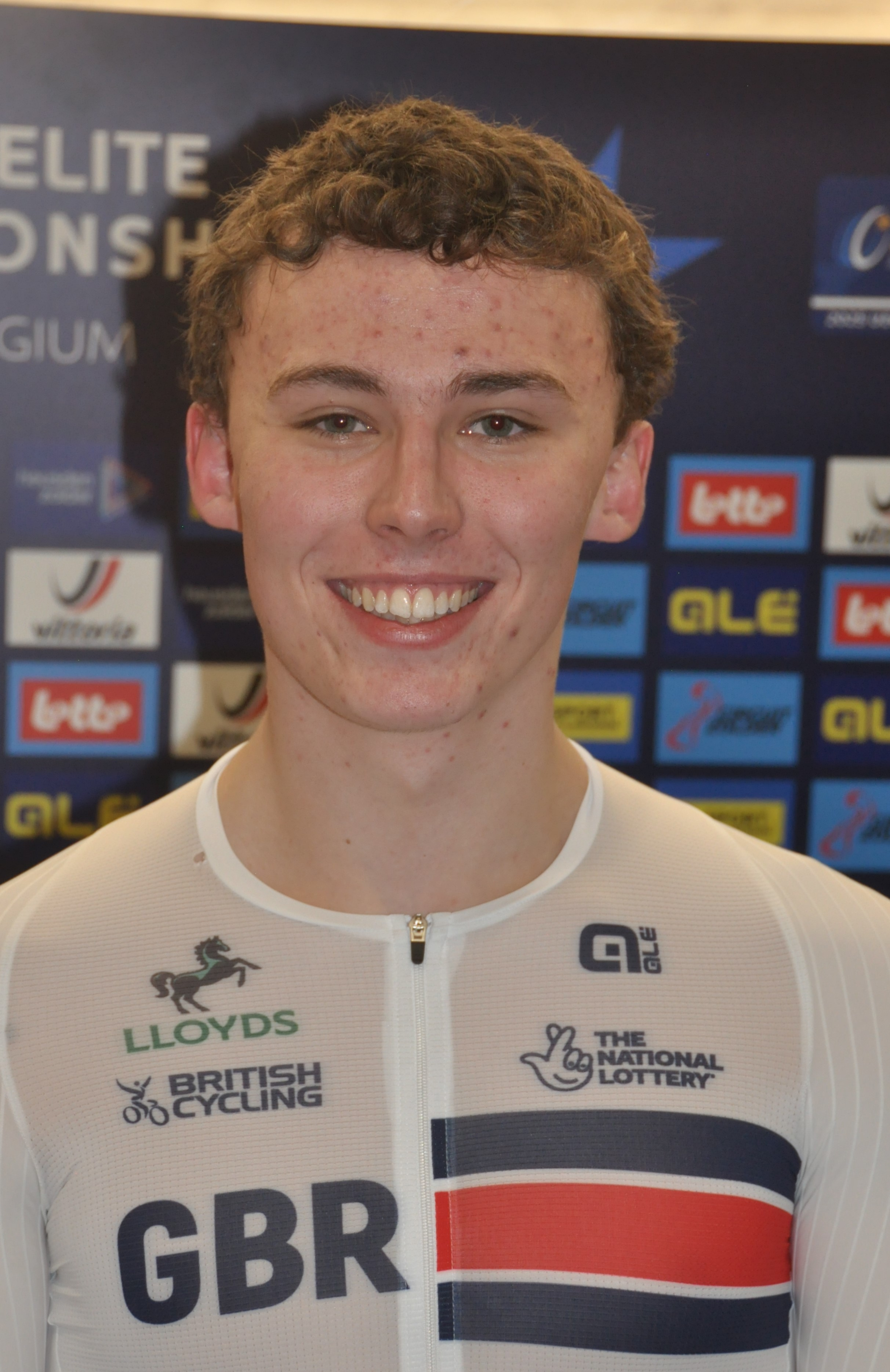
- Radford in 2025

Personal information
- Nationality: British (English)
- Born: 28 July 2005 (age 21) Bury, Greater Manchester
- Height: 176 cm (5 ft 9 in)
- Weight: 80 kg (176 lb)

Sport
- Country: Great Britain
- Sport: Cycling
- Event: Sprint
- Club: Bury Cycle Speedway Club
Medal record
Men's track cycling
Representing Great Britain
European Championships
Silver medal – second place	2026 Konya	Team sprint
Bronze medal – third place	2025 Heusden-Zolder	Team sprint

Harry Radford is a British track cyclist. He won silver and bronze medals in the team sprint at the 2025 and 2026 UEC European Track Championships.

== Career ==
Radford started cycling at the age of nine-years old, progressing into the British Track Cycling Team. He joined the junior academy in 2021, and the world class programme in 2023.

In February 2025, he won the bronze medal with the British team at the 2025 UEC European Track Championships in the Men's team sprint, alongside Harry Ledingham-Horn, and Hayden Norris, in Belgium in February 2025. In March 2025, he was part of the British team which set a new British record in winning gold in the men's team sprint at the UCI Track Nations Cup in Turkey, alongside Matthew Richardson and Ledingham-Horn.

Radford won a silver medal with the British team sprint at the 2026 UEC European Track Championships in Turkey in February 2026.

== Personal life ==
He is from Bury, Greater Manchester.

His nickname is Scratchy
