= Kwesi Browne =

Trinidad and Tobago male track cyclist

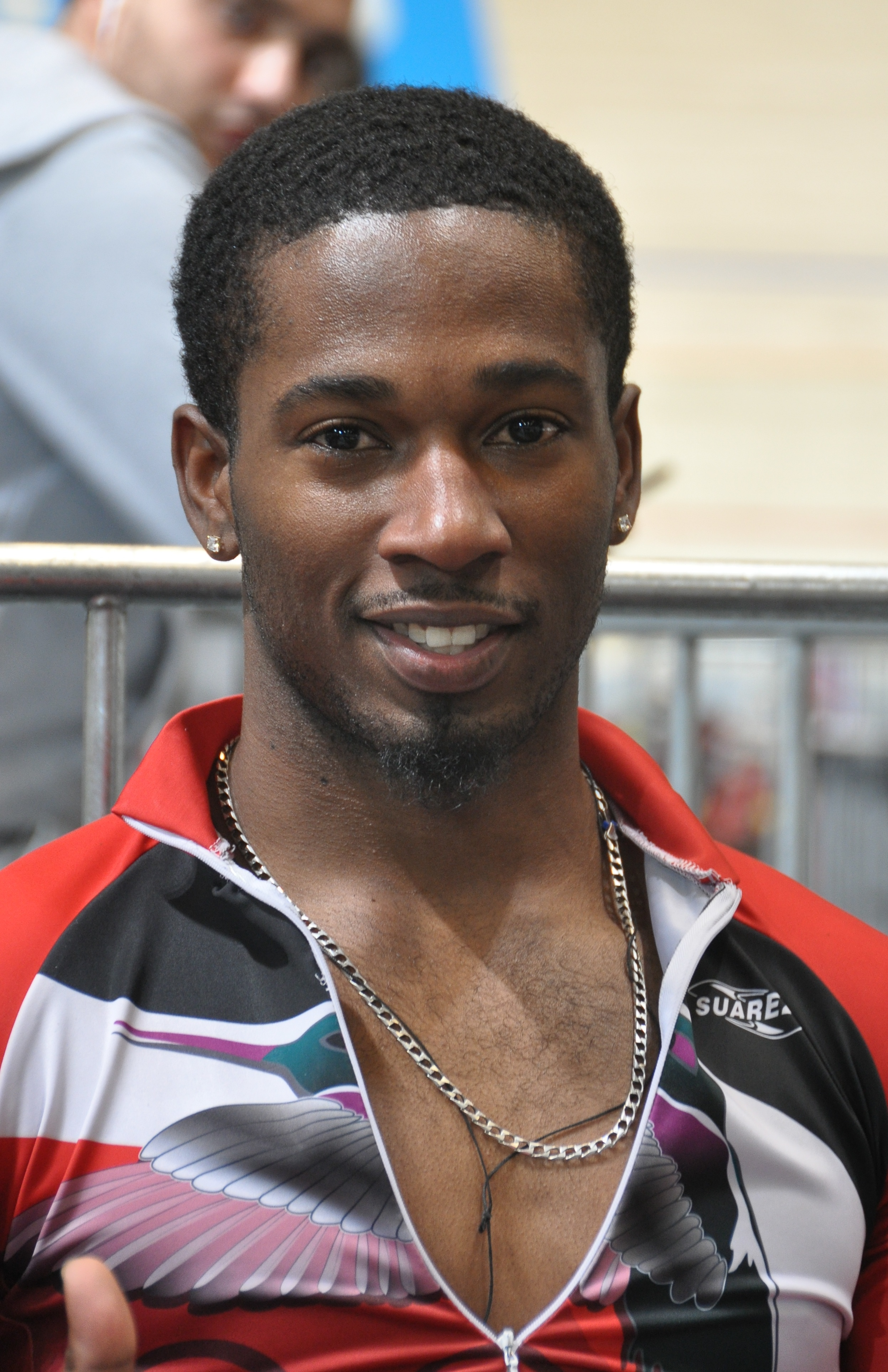
- Kwesi Browne (2016)

Personal information
- Born: 31 January 1994 (age 32)

Cycling career
- Sport: Cycling
- Discipline: Track cycling
Medal record
Men's track cycling
Representing Trinidad and Tobago
Pan American Championships
Gold medal – first place	2018 Aguascalientes	Team sprint
Gold medal – first place	2022 Lima	Team sprint
Silver medal – second place	2017 Couva	Team sprint
Silver medal – second place	2023 San Juan	Team sprint
Bronze medal – third place	2016 Aguascalientes	Keirin
Bronze medal – third place	2024 Carson	Keirin
Bronze medal – third place	2026 Santiago	Team sprint
Central American and Caribbean Games
Gold medal – first place	2026 Santo Domingo	Keirin
Bronze medal – third place	2014 Veracruz	Keirin
Bronze medal – third place	2026 Santo Domingo	Sprint
Bronze medal – third place	2026 Santo Domingo	Team sprint

Kwesi Browne (born 31 January 1994) is a Trinidadian-French male track cyclist, representing Trinidad and Tobago at international competitions. He won the bronze medal in the keirin at the 2014 Central American and Caribbean Games and also at the 2016 Pan American Track Cycling Championships.

He is currently training at the World Cycling Centre in Aigle, Switzerland in the lead up to the 2020 Olympic Games in Tokyo, Japan for which he has qualified to represent Trinidad and Tobago in his pet event, the Keirin.
