= Dominik Topinka =

Czech cyclist

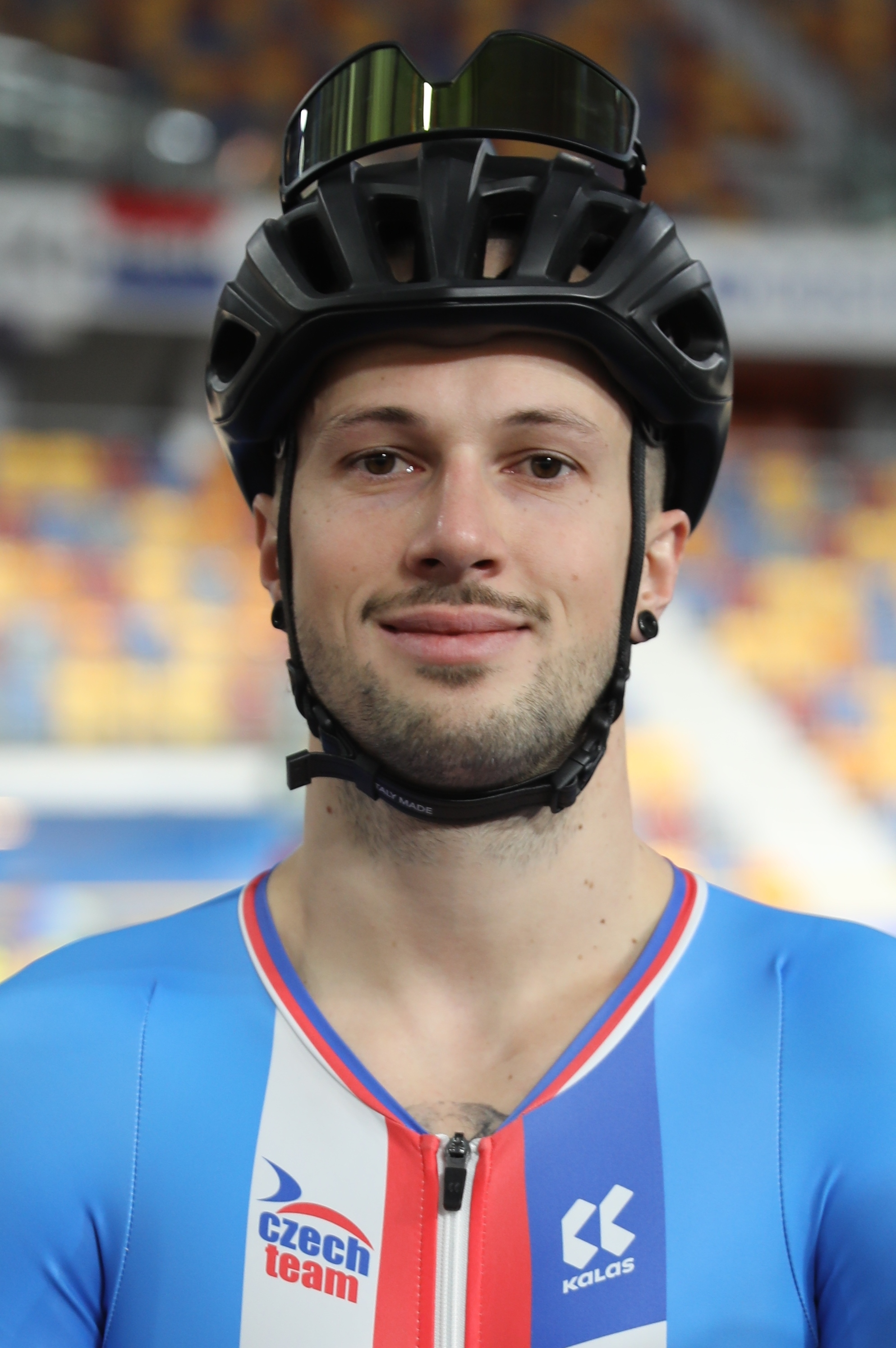
- Dominik Topinka in 2024

Personal information
- Born: 31 July 1993 (age 33)

Cycling career
- Sport: Cycling
- Disciplines: Track; BMX
- Role: Rider
- Rider type: Sprinter
Medal record
Men's track cycling
Representing Czech Republic
European Championships
Silver medal – second place	2020 Plovdiv	Team sprint

Dominik Topinka (born 31 July 1993) is a Czech track cyclist, who competes in sprinting events. He also competes in BMX racing.
