= List of Cuban records in track cycling =

The following are the national records in track cycling in Cuba maintained by the Cuban Cycling Federation.

== Men ==
Event	Record	Athlete	Date	Meet	Place	Ref
Flying 200 m time trial	10.084	Ivan Delis	13 September 2014	Pan American Championships	Aguascalientes, Mexico	
250 m time trial (standing start)	19.509	Yansel Arias	8 September 2019	Pan American Championships	Cochabamba, Bolivia	
1 km time trial	1:01.700	Yansel Arias	8 September 2019	Pan American Championships	Cochabamba, Bolivia	
4000m individual pursuit	4:27.711	Maykol Hernández	31 August 2018	Pan American Championships	Aguascalientes, Mexico	
4000m team pursuit	4:15.824	Yans Carlos Arias; Rubén Companioni; Leandro Marcos; Pedro Sibila	17 October 2011	Pan American Games	Guadalajara, Mexico	

== Women ==
Event	Record	Athlete	Date	Meet	Place	Ref
Flying 200 m time trial	10.744	Lisandra Guerra	8 February 2013	Pan American Championships	Mexico City, Mexico	
250 m time trial (standing start)	19.141	Lisandra Guerra	19 February 2015	World Championships	Saint-Quentin-en-Yvelines, France	
500 m time trial	33.036	Lisandra Guerra	11 September 2014	Pan American Sports Festival	Aguascalientes, Mexico	
1 km time trial	1:13.389	Keila Leal	5 April 2025	Pan American Championships	Asunción, Paraguay	
Team sprint	33.734	Marlies Mejías; Lisandra Guerra	5 December 2013	World Cup	Aguascalientes, Mexico	
3000m individual pursuit	3:31.102	Marlies Mejías	25 July 2018	CAC Games	Cali, Colombia	
3000m team pursuit	3:23.446	Yudelmis Domínguez; Marlies Mejías; Arlenis Sierra	7 February 2013	Pan American Championships	Mexico City, Mexico	
4000m team pursuit	4:31.235	Marlies Mejías; Arlenis Sierra; Yudelmis Domínguez; Yumari González	18 November 2014	CAC Games	Xalapa, Mexico	
