= Cuban National Road Championships =

National road cycling championships in Cuba

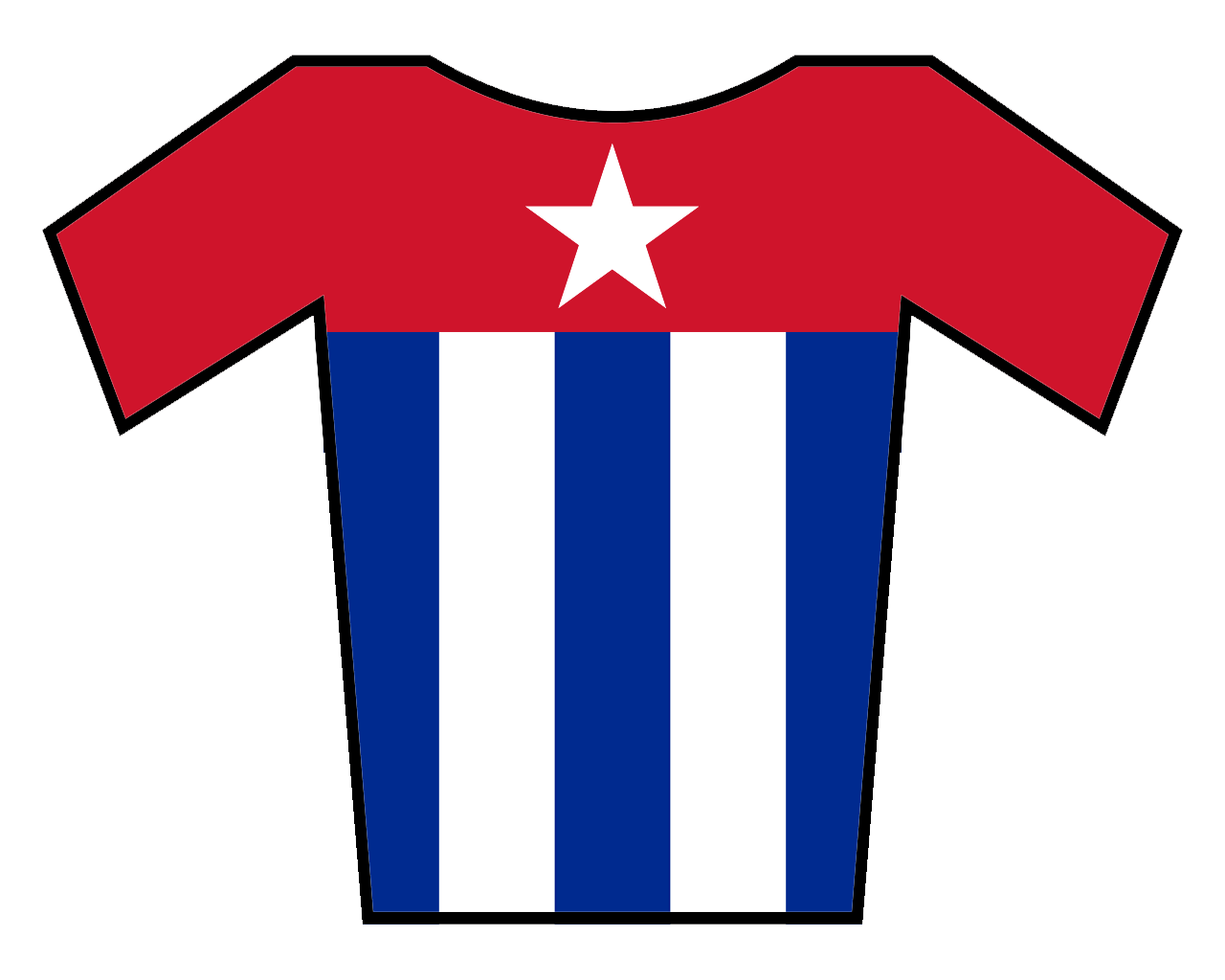

Race details
- Date: June
- Discipline: Road
- Type: One-day race

The Cuban National Road Race Championships are held annually to decide the cycling champions in both the road race and time trial discipline, across various categories.

== Men ==
=== Road race ===
Year	Winner	Second	Third
2000	Adonis Cardoso	Fernando Pio Batista	Roberto Cabrera
2001	Pedro Pablo Pérez	Yosvany Falcón	Luis Amarán
2005	Damián Martínez	Lizardo Benítez	Adonis Cardozo
2006	Arnold Alcolea	Pedro Pablo Pérez	Lizardo Benítez
2007	No race
2008	Yans Carlos Arias	Adonis Cardoso	Pedro Sibila
2009	No race
2010	Raúl Granjel	Arnold Alcolea	Yans Carlos Arias
2011	Arnold Alcolea	Yennier López	Yasmani Martínez
2012	Pedro Sibila	Arnold Alcolea	Yennier López
2013	No race
2014	Arnold Alcolea	Felix Nodarse	Leandro Marcos
2015	José Mojica	Leandro Marcos	Onel Santa Clara
2016	José Mojica	Felix Nodarse	Leandro Marcos
2017	Yans Carlos Arias	Emilio Pérez Labrador	Yasmani Balmaceda
2018	Emilio Pérez Labrador	Félix Nodarse	Yans Carlos Arias
2019	Félix Nodarse	Hidalgo Vera	Pedro Portuondo

=== Time trial ===
Year	Winner	Second	Third
2000	Luis Amarán	Willian Leiva	Alexander Clavero
2001	Luis Amarán	Willian Leiva	Arnold Alcolea
2005	Luis Amarán	Arnold Alcolea	Yulien Rodríguez
2006	Arnold Alcolea	Yulien Rodríguez	Reldy Pérez
2007	No race
2008	Pedro Portuondo	Adonis Cardoso	Yasmani Martínez
2009	No race
2010	Arnold Alcolea	Raúl Granjel	Yennier López
2011	Arnold Alcolea	Pedro Portuondo	Yasmani Martínez
2012-2013	No race
2014	Yennier López	Arnold Alcolea	Víctor Horta
2015	José Mojica	Víctor Horta	Yariel De León
2016	Pedro Portuondo	José Mojica	Yans Carlos Arias
2017	Emilio Pérez Labrador	Yans Carlos Arias	Yasmani Balmaceda
2018	Pedro Portuondo	Yans Carlos Arias	Yasmani Balmaceda
2019	Yans Carlos Arias	Pedro Portuondo	Javier Revilla

== Women ==
=== Road race ===
Year	Winner	Second	Third
2001	Yoanka González	Yuliet Rodríguez	Yeilien Fernández
2002-2004	No race
2006	Yeilien Fernández	Yoanka González	Yudelmis Domínguez
2007	No race
2008	Yumari González	Yanisleidys Blanco	Dalila Rodríguez
2009	No race
2010	Yudelmis Domínguez	Marlies Mejías	Yaima Torres
2011	No race
2012	Yumari González	Arlenis Sierra	Marlies Mejías
2013	No race
2014	Arlenis Sierra	Marlies Mejías	Yumari González
2015	Arlenis Sierra	Marlies Mejías	Iraida García
2016	Arlenis Sierra	Iraido García	Marlies Mejías
2017	Arlenis Sierra	Mailín Sánchez	Jeydy Pradera
2018	Yudelmis Domínguez	Arlenis Sierra	Mailín Sánchez
2019	Arlenis Sierra	Idarys Cervantes	Yusmary Diaz

=== Time trial ===
Year	Winner	Second	Third
2001	Yoanka González	Yuliet Rodríguez	Mayvis Fuentes
2002-2004	No race
2005	Yuliet Rodríguez	Yoanka González	Yumari González
2006-2007	No race
2008	Yoanka González	Yumari González	Yaima Torres
2009	No race
2010	Dalila Rodríguez	Yudelmis Domínguez	Yaima Torres
2011-2013	No race
2014	Yoanka González	Arlenis Sierra	Marlies Mejías
2015	Marlies Mejías	Arlenis Sierra	Yumari González
2016	Yumari González	Iraida García	Marlies Mejías
2017	Arlenis Sierra	Yeima Torres	Yudelmis Domínguez
2018	Marlies Mejías	Jeydy Pradera	Yudelmis Domínguez
2019	Arlenis Sierra	Jeydy Pradera	Yeima Torres
