= Arnold Alcolea =

Cuban cyclist (born 1982)

Personal information
- Full name: Arnold Alcolea Nuñez
- Born: 25 April 1982 (age 44) Santiago de Cuba, Cuba

Cycling career
- Sport: Cycling
- Current team: Retired
- Discipline: Road
- Role: Rider

Amateur team
- 2008–2015: Mapache
Medal record
Representing Cuba
Men's road bicycle racing
Pan American Games
Bronze medal – third place	2011 Guadalajara	Road race
Pan American Championships
Silver medal – second place	2010 Aguascalientes	Road race
Men's track cycling
Central American and Caribbean Games
Silver medal – second place	2014 Veracruz	Points race

Arnold Alcolea Nuñez (born 25 April 1982) is a Cuban former racing cyclist who competed at the 2012 Summer Olympics, and at the 2014 Central American and Caribbean Games in Veracruz, Mexico. In 2006 and 2011 he was both the Cuban Road Race Champion and Time Trial Champion. He was born in Santiago de Cuba.

== Major results ==
2001
3rd Time trial, National Road Championships
2003
1st Stage 2 Vuelta a Cuba
2005
1st Stage 10b Vuelta a Venezuela
2nd Time trial, National Road Championships
7th Overall Vuelta a Cuba
2006
National Road Championships

1st Road race
1st Time trial

6th Overall Vuelta a Cuba

1st Mountains classification

2007
1st Stage 13 Vuelta al Táchira
6th Overall Vuelta a Cuba
7th Overall Vuelta Ciclista a Costa Rica

1st Stages 6 & 7

2008
3rd Overall Vuelta Ciclista a Costa Rica

1st Stage 5

5th Overall Vuelta Ciclista Chiapas
7th Overall Vuelta a Cuba
8th Overall Vuelta a la Independencia Nacional
2009
1st Overall Vuelta a Cuba

1st Stage 8

2010
National Road Championships

1st Time trial
2nd Road race

1st Overall Vuelta a Cuba
1st Stage 4 Vuelta Ciclista Chiapas
Pan American Road Championships

2nd Road race
5th Time trial

3rd 2009–10 UCI America Tour
6th Overall Vuelta a Venezuela
9th Overall Tour de San Luis
10th Overall Vuelta Ciclista a Costa Rica

1st Stage 5

2011
National Road Championships

1st Road race
1st Time trial

Pan American Games

3rd Road race
10th Time trial

Pan American Road Championships

9th Road race
10th Time trial

2012
2nd Road race, National Road Championships
7th Overall Vuelta Mexico Telmex
7th Overall Vuelta Ciclista a Costa Rica

1st Stage 11

2013
6th Road race, Pan American Road Championships
2014
National Road Championships

1st Road race
2nd Time trial

1st Sprints classification Vuelta Ciclista a Costa Rica
Central American and Caribbean Games

2nd Points race
5th Road race
