= Rubén Murillo =

Colombian cyclist (born 1990)

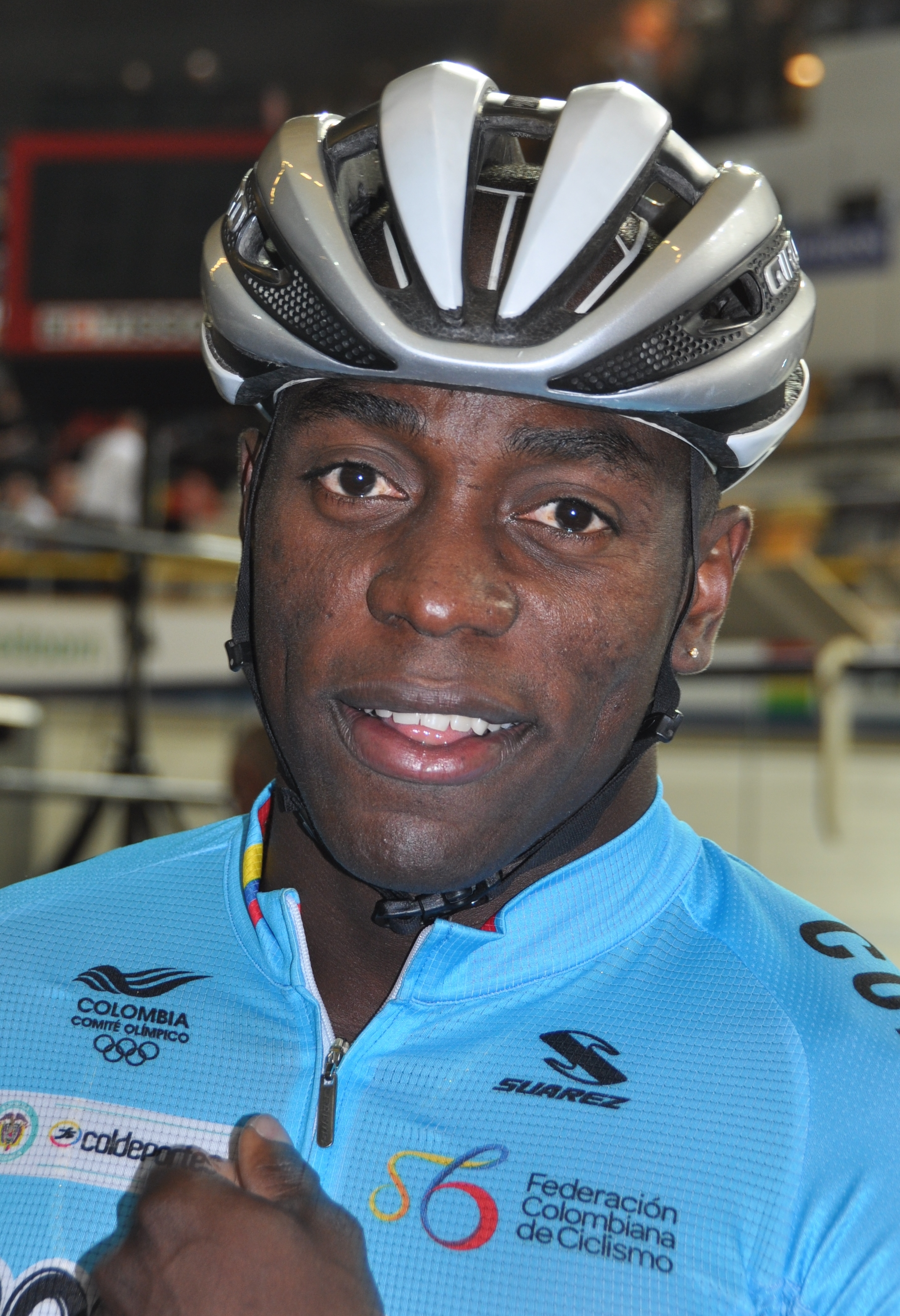
- Rubén Murillo (2018)

Personal information
- Full name: Rubén Darío Murillo Minota
- Born: 29 January 1990 (age 36) Apartadó, Antioquia, Colombia
- Height: 170 cm (5 ft 7 in)
- Weight: 76 kg (168 lb)

Cycling career
- Sport: Cycling
- Current team: Colombia
- Discipline: Track cycling
- Role: Rider
- Rider type: team sprint
Medal record
Representing Colombia
Men's track cycling
Event	1st	2nd	3rd
Nations Cup stage	0	1	1
Pan American Games	1	1	0
Pan American Championships	4	4	1
CAC Games	0	2	1
South American Games	4	1	0
Bolivarian Games	2	1	0
Total	11	10	3
Pan American Games
Gold medal – first place	2019 Lima	Team sprint
Silver medal – second place	2023 Santiago	Team sprint
Pan American Championships
Gold medal – first place	2016 Aguascalientes	Team sprint
Gold medal – first place	2017 Couva	Team sprint
Gold medal – first place	2021 Lima	Team sprint
Gold medal – first place	2024 Carson	Team sprint
Silver medal – second place	2014 Aguascalientes	Team sprint
Silver medal – second place	2018 Aguascalientes	Team sprint
Silver medal – second place	2025 Asunción	Team sprint
Silver medal – second place	2026 Santiago	Team sprint
Bronze medal – third place	2023 San Juan	Team sprint
Central American and Caribbean Games
Silver medal – second place	2014 Veracruz	Team sprint
Silver medal – second place	2026 Santo Domingo	Team sprint
Bronze medal – third place	2018 Barranquilla	Team sprint
South American Games
Gold medal – first place	2018 Cochabamba	Team sprint
Gold medal – first place	2022 Asunción	Sprint
Gold medal – first place	2022 Asunción	Team sprint
Gold medal – first place	2026 Santa Fe	Team sprint
Silver medal – second place	2014 Santiago	Team sprint
Bolivarian Games
Gold medal – first place	2017 Santa Marta	Team sprint
Gold medal – first place	2025 Lima-Ayacucho	Team sprint
Silver medal – second place	2013 Trujillo	Team sprint

Rubén Darío Murillo Minota (born 29 January 1990) is a Colombian male track cyclist. He competed in the team sprint event at the 2015 UCI Track Cycling World Championships.
