= Cycling at the 2026 Central American and Caribbean Games =

- Venue: George Washington Avenue (Road Race); Salud Avenue (Time Trial); Centro Olímpico Juan Pablo Duarte (Track); Circuito MTB (Mountain); Pista de BMX (BMX)
- Location: Santo Domingo, Dominican Republic
- Dates: 25 July–2 August (Road); 27–30 July (Track); 1 August (Mountain); 30 July (BMX)

The cycling competition at the 2026 Central American and Caribbean Games was held in Santo Domingo, Dominican Republic, from 25 July to 2 August 2026 at George Washington Avenue for the road race, Salud Avenue for the time trial, the Centro Olímpico Juan Pablo Duarte for track events, Circuito MTB for mountain biking and Pista de BMX for the BMX races.

== Participating nations ==
The number of athletes a nation entered is in parentheses beside the name of the country.

Road cycling

- Bermuda (3)
- Belize (2)
- Colombia (9)
- Costa Rica (7)
- Cuba (7)
- Dominican Republic (10)
- El Salvador (2)
- Guadeloupe (2)
- Guatemala (8)
- Haiti (2)
- Honduras (6)
- Jamaica (1)
- Mexico (9)
- Nicaragua (1)
- Panama (7)
- Puerto Rico (3)
- Trinidad and Tobago (5)
- Venezuela (8)

Track cycling

- Antigua and Barbuda (1)
- Barbados (2)
- Colombia (14)
- Cuba (7)
- Dominican Republic (12)
- Guadeloupe (4)
- Guatemala (5)
- Jamaica (3)
- Mexico (14)
- Suriname (2)
- Trinidad and Tobago (11)
- Venezuela (16)

Mountain biking

- Bermuda (1)
- Colombia (4)
- Costa Rica (4)
- Dominican Republic (3)
- El Salvador (2)
- Guadeloupe (1)
- Guatemala (4)
- Honduras (4)
- Mexico (4)
- Nicaragua (2)
- Panama (1)
- Puerto Rico (4)
- Trinidad and Tobago (2)

BMX

- Colombia (4)
- Costa Rica (1)
- Dominican Republic (2)
- El Salvador (2)
- Guatemala (3)
- Mexico (4)
- Puerto Rico (1)
- Venezuela (1)

== Medal table ==
* Host nation (Dominican Republic)

Rank	Nation	Gold	Silver	Bronze	Total
1	Colombia	9	7	4	20
2	Mexico	8	7	5	20
3	Cuba	2	2	0	4
4	Trinidad and Tobago	1	1	6	8
5	Venezuela	0	1	3	4
6	Puerto Rico	0	1	1	2
7	Costa Rica	0	1	0	1
8	Panama	0	0	1	1
Totals (8 entries)		20	20	20	60

== Medal summary ==
=== Road cycling ===
Event	Gold	Silver	Bronze
Men's road race	Nicolás Gómez; Colombia	Joseph Ramírez; Costa Rica	Roberto González; Panama
Men's time trial	Walter Vargas; Colombia	Edgar Cadena; Mexico	Sebastián Ruiz; Mexico
Women's road race	Marlies Mejías; Cuba	Teniel Campbell; Trinidad and Tobago	Yareli Acevedo; Mexico
Women's time trial	Marlies Mejías; Cuba	Sara Roel; Mexico	Teniel Campbell; Trinidad and Tobago

=== Track cycling ===
Men

Event	Gold	Silver	Bronze
Individual sprint	Kevin Quintero; Colombia	Cristian Ortega; Colombia	Kwesi Browne; Trinidad and Tobago
Team sprint	Mexico; Jafet López; Ridley Malo; Edgar Verdugo	Colombia; Rubén Murillo; Cristian Ortega; Kevin Quintero	Trinidad and Tobago; Kwesi Browne; Ryan D'Abreau; Danell James
Team pursuit	Colombia; Brayan Sánchez; Juan Esteban Arango; Bryan Gómez; Jordan Parra	Mexico; Ricardo Peña; Ulises Alfredo Castillo; Ignacio Prado; Sebastián Ruiz	Venezuela; Clever Martínez; Jorge Abreu; Bladimir Alvarado; Franklin Chacón; Arlex Mendez
Keirin	Kwesi Browne; Trinidad and Tobago	Cristian Ortega; Colombia	Kevin Quintero; Colombia
Madison	Mexico; Ricardo Peña; Ignacio Prado	Venezuela; Clever Martínez; Arlex Méndez	Colombia; Brayan Sánchez; Jordan Parra
Omnium	Ricardo Peña; Mexico	Ricardo Delgado; Cuba	Akil Campbell; Trinidad and Tobago

Women

Event	Gold	Silver	Bronze
Individual sprint	Stefany Cuadrado; Colombia	Daniela Gaxiola; Mexico	Yuli Verdugo; Mexico
Team sprint	Mexico; Daniela Gaxiola; Jessica Salazar; Yuli Verdugo	Colombia; Stefany Cuadrado; Juliana Gaviria; Valeria Hernández	Trinidad and Tobago; Teniel Campbell; Phoebe Sandy; Kyra Williams
Team pursuit	Colombia; Lina Hernández; Elizabeth Castaño; Luciana Osorio; Camila Valbuena	Mexico; Yareli Acevedo; Sofía Arreola; Antonieta Gaxiola; Andrea Robles	Venezuela; Veronica Abreu; Fabiana Candelas; Lilibeth Chacón; María Daza; Yeniret Roa
Keirin	Daniela Gaxiola; Mexico	Stefany Cuadrado; Colombia	Yuli Verdugo; Mexico
Madison	Colombia; Elizabeth Castaño; Lina Hernández	Mexico; Sofía Arreola; Yareli Acevedo	Trinidad and Tobago; Alexi Acosta; Teniel Campbell
Omnium	Yareli Acevedo; Mexico	Marlies Mejías; Cuba	Lina Hernández; Colombia

=== Mountain biking ===
Event	Gold	Silver	Bronze
Men's cross-country	Gerardo Ulloa; Mexico	Adair Gutiérrez; Mexico	Georwill Pérez; Puerto Rico
Women's cross-country	Carolina Flores; Mexico	Suheily Rodríguez; Puerto Rico	Ana María Roa; Colombia

=== BMX ===
Event	Gold	Silver	Bronze
Men's race	Diego Arboleda; Colombia	Carlos Ramírez; Colombia	Jhorman Sivira; Venezuela
Women's race	Valentina Muñoz; Colombia	Sharid Fayad; Colombia	Marissa Flores; Mexico
