= Cycling at the 2014 Central American and Caribbean Games =

- Venue: Xalapa-Coatepec Route
- Location: (Mexico) Veracruz
- Dates: 16–23 November

The cycling competition at the 2014 Central American and Caribbean Games was held in Veracruz, Mexico.

The road cycling tournament was scheduled to be held on 16 and 23 November on the Xalapa-Coatepec Route. The track cycling tournament was scheduled to be held from 17 to 21 November at the Velodrome in Xalapa. The mountain cycling tournament was scheduled to be held on 15 November at the Coatepec Mountain Circuit. The bmx cycling tournament was scheduled to be held on 22 November at Natura park.

Colombia led the medal count with 12 gold medals and 24 total medals.

== Medal summary ==
=== Road events ===
Event	Gold	Silver	Bronze
Men's road race	Carlos Galviz (VEN)	Florencio Ramos (MEX)	Manuel Rodas (GUA)
Women's road race	Marlies Mejías (CUB)	Yumari González (CUB)	María Luisa Calle (COL)
Men's time trial	Brayan Ramírez (COL)	Fernando Gaviria (COL)	Bernardo Colex (MEX)
Women's time trial	María Luisa Calle (COL)	Sérika Gulumá (COL)	Lilibeth Chacón (VEN)

=== Track events ===
Event	Gold	Silver	Bronze
Men's sprint	Fabián Puerta (COL)	Hersony Canelón (VEN)	Jair Tjon En Fa (SUR)
Women's sprint	Lisandra Guerra (CUB)	Diana García (COL)	Daniela Gaxiola (MEX)
Men's team sprint	Venezuela (VEN); Hersony Canelón; Ángel Pulgar; César Marcano	Colombia (COL); Fabián Puerta; Rubén Murillo; Anderson Parra	Mexico (MEX); Edgar Verdugo; Ruben Horta; Roberto Serrano
Women's team sprint	Cuba (CUB); Lisandra Guerra; Marlies Mejías	Mexico (MEX); Frany Fong; Daniela Gaxiola	Venezuela (VEN); Daniela Larreal; Marynes Prada
Men's 1 km time trial	Fabián Puerta (COL)	Ángel Pulgar (VEN)	Anderson Parra (COL)
Women's 500m time trial	Lisandra Guerra (CUB)	Daniela Gaxiola (MEX)	Frany Fong (MEX)
Men's keirin	Fabián Puerta (COL)	Hersony Canelón (VEN)	Kwesi Browne (TRI)
Women's keirin	Lisandra Guerra (CUB)	Daniela Larreal (VEN)	Daniela Gaxiola (MEX)
Men's individual pursuit	Juan Esteban Arango (COL)	Ignacio Prado (MEX)	Víctor Moreno (VEN)
Women's individual pursuit	Marlies Mejías (CUB)	Yudelmis Domínguez (CUB)	María Luisa Calle (COL)
Men's team pursuit	Colombia (COL); Kevin Ríos; Weimar Roldán; Eduardo Estrada; Juan Esteban Arango	Mexico (MEX); Ignacio Sarabia; Jose Ramon Aguirre; Diego Yepez; Ignacio Prado	Venezuela (VEN); Manuel Briceno; Víctor Moreno; Isaac Yaguaro; Randal Figueroa
Women's team pursuit	Cuba (CUB); Marlies Mejías; Arlenis Sierra; Yudelmis Domínguez; Yumari González	Mexico (MEX); Jessica Bonilla; Lizbeth Salazar; Íngrid Drexel; Mayra Rocha	Colombia (COL); Milena Salcedo; Valentina Paniagua; Lorena Vargas; Jessica Parra
Men's scratch race	Alejandro Padilla (GUA)	Diego Yepez (MEX)	Jordan Parra (COL)
Women's scratch race	Angie González (VEN)	Lizbeth Salazar (MEX)	Arlenis Sierra (CUB)
Men's points race	Weimar Roldán (COL)	Arnold Alcolea (CUB)	Luis Fernando Macias (MEX)
Women's points race	Lizbeth Salazar (MEX)	Yudelmis Domínguez (CUB)	Lilibeth Chacón (VEN)
Men's omnium	Fernando Gaviria (COL)	Ignacio Sarabia (MEX)	Víctor Moreno (VEN)
Women's omnium	Marlies Mejías (CUB)	Milena Salcedo (COL)	Angie González (VEN)

=== Mountain events ===
Event	Gold	Silver	Bronze
Men's cross country	Héctor Leonardo Páez (COL)	Fabio Castañeda (COL)	Andrey Fonseca (CRC)
Women's cross country	Daniela Campuzano (MEX)	Laura Lorena Monfin (MEX)	Adriana María Rojas (CRC)

=== BMX events ===
Event	Gold	Silver	Bronze
Men's BMX	Carlos Ramírez (COL)	Carlos Oquendo (COL)	Christopher Mireles (MEX)
Women's BMX	Mariana Pajón (COL)	Stefany Hernández (VEN)	Dominique Daniels (PUR)

== Medal table ==
* Host nation (Mexico)

Rank	Nation	Gold	Silver	Bronze	Total
1	Colombia (COL)	12	7	5	24
2	Cuba (CUB)	8	4	1	13
3	Venezuela (VEN)	3	5	7	15
4	Mexico (MEX)*	2	10	7	19
5	Guatemala (GUA)	1	0	1	2
6	Costa Rica (CRC)	0	0	2	2
7	Puerto Rico (PUR)	0	0	1	1
7	Suriname (SUR)	0	0	1	1
7	Trinidad and Tobago (TRI)	0	0	1	1
Totals (9 entries)		26	26	26	78
