= Cycling at the 2011 Pan American Games – Women's road race =

Women's road race at the 2011 Pan American Games
- Venue: Guadalajara Circuit
- Dates: October 22
- Competitors: 33 from 16 nations

Medalists
Gold medal	Arlenis Sierra	Cuba
Silver medal	Yumari González	Cuba
Bronze medal	Yudelmis Domínguez	Cuba

The women's road race competition of the cycling events at the 2011 Pan American Games was held on October 22 at the Guadalajara Circuit in Guadalajara. The defending Pan American Games champion was Yumari González of Cuba, who finished second and earned a silver medal.

== Schedule ==
All times are Central Standard Time (UTC−6).

Date	Time	Round
October 22, 2011	9:00	Final

== Results ==
33 competitors from 16 countries are scheduled to compete.

Rank	Rider	Time
1st place, gold medalist(s)	Arlenis Sierra (CUB)	2:18:10
2nd place, silver medalist(s)	Yumari González (CUB)	2:18:23
3rd place, bronze medalist(s)	Yudelmis Domínguez (CUB)	2:18:23
4	Ana Casas (MEX)	2:18:23
5	María Luisa Calle (COL)	2:18:23
6	Joëlle Numainville (CAN)	2:18:23
7	Angie González (VEN)	2:18:23
8	Paola Muñoz (CHI)	2:18:23
9	Robin Farina (USA)	2:18:23
10	Claudia Leal (MEX)	2:18:23
11	Danielys García (VEN)	2:18:23
12	Evelyn García (ESA)	2:18:23
13	Clemilda Silva (BRA)	2:18:23
14	Edith Guillen (CRC)	2:18:23
15	Uenia De Souza (BRA)	2:18:23
16	Adriana Rojas (CRC)	2:18:23
17	Lilibeth Chacón (VEN)	2:18:23
18	Alexandra Serrano (ECU)	2:18:23
19	Luz Tovar (COL)	2:18:23
20	Janildes Silva (BRA)	2:18:23
21	Mayra Rocha (MEX)	2:18:23
22	Denise Ramsden (CAN)	2:18:23
23	Olga Cisterna (CHI)	2:18:29
24	Sérika Gulumá (COL)	2:18:29
25	Natalia Navarro (CRC)	2:18:29
26	Daniela Guajardo (CHI)	2:18:48
27	Maria Bone (ECU)	2:19:29
28	Laura Brown (CAN)	2:19:57
29	Talia Aguirre (ARG)	2:19:57
30	Alejandra Feszczuk (ARG)	2:21:13
31	Dolores Rodriguez (ARG)	2:23:03
32	Tamiko Butler (ATG)	2:24:04
33	Valeria Escobar (BOL)	2:25:10
