= Cycling at the 2015 Pan American Games – Women's omnium =

Cycling – Women's omnium at the 2015 Pan American Games
- Venue: Milton Velodrome
- Dates: July 18–19
- Competitors: 12 from 12 nations
- Winning score: 233

Medalists
Gold medal	Sarah Hammer	United States
Silver medal	Jasmin Glaesser	Canada
Bronze medal	Marlies Mejías	Cuba

The women's omnium competition of the cycling events at the 2015 Pan American Games was held on July 18 and 19 at the Milton Velodrome in Milton, Ontario.

== Schedule ==
All times are Eastern Daylight Time (UTC−4).

Date	Time	Round
July 18, 2015	12:19	Scratch
July 18, 2015	13:04	Individual Pursuit
July 18, 2015	19:14	Elimination
July 19, 2015	11:13	500 m Time Trial
July 19, 2015	11:51	Flying Lap
July 19, 2015	19:18	Points Race
July 19, 2015	19:18	Overall

== Results ==
=== Scratch ===
Rank	Name	Nation	Laps down	Notes
1	Cristina Irma Greve	Argentina		
2	Angie González	Venezuela		
3	Denísse Ahumada	Chile		
4	Sarah Hammer	United States	-1	
5	Jasmin Glaesser	Canada	-1	
6	Marlies Mejías	Cuba	-1	
7	Jannie Salcedo	Colombia	-1	
8	Lizbeth Salazar	Mexico	-1	
9	Nicolle Bruderer	Guatemala	-1	
10	Wellyda Rodrigues	Brazil	-1	
11	Miryam Nuzez Padilla	Ecuador	-1	
	Marcela Rubiano	Costa Rica	DNF	

=== Individual Pursuit ===
Rank	Name	Nation	Time	Notes
1	Sarah Hammer	United States	3:31.952	PR
2	Jasmin Glaesser	Canada	3:34.747	
3	Marlies Mejías	Cuba	3:34.856	
4	Cristina Irma Greve	Argentina	3:41.534	
5	Lizbeth Salazar	Mexico	3:43.819	
6	Denísse Ahumada	Chile	3:49.714	
7	Angie González	Venezuela	3:50.057	
8	Nicolle Bruderer	Guatemala	3:50.988	
9	Jannie Salcedo	Colombia	3:53.301	
10	Wellyda Rodrigues	Brazil	4:01.239	
11	Miryam Nuzez Padilla	Ecuador	4:06.608	
12	Marcela Rubiano	Costa Rica	4:15.121	

=== Elimination ===
Rank	Name	Nation	Notes
1	Jasmin Glaesser	Canada	
1	Sarah Hammer	United States	
3	Denísse Ahumada	Chile	
4	Angie González	Venezuela	
5	Marlies Mejías	Cuba	
6	Lizbeth Salazar	Mexico	
7	Cristina Irma Greve	Argentina	
8	Jannie Salcedo	Colombia	
9	Wellyda Rodrigues	Brazil	
10	Marcela Rubiano	Costa Rica	
11	Miryam Nuzez Padilla	Ecuador	
12	Nicolle Bruderer	Guatemala	

=== 500 m Time Trial ===
Rank	Name	Nation	Time	Notes
1	Marlies Mejías	Cuba	35.285	
2	Sarah Hammer	United States	36.371	
3	Angie González	Venezuela	36.633	
4	Cristina Irma Greve	Argentina	36.991	
5	Jannie Salcedo	Colombia	37.133	
6	Wellyda Rodrigues	Brazil	37.206	
7	Jasmin Glaesser	Canada	37.678	
8	Lizbeth Salazar	Mexico	37.921	
9	Nicolle Bruderer	Guatemala	39.148	
10	Miryam Nuzez Padilla	Ecuador	39.553	
11	Denísse Ahumada	Chile	40.051	
12	Marcela Rubiano	Costa Rica	41.561	

=== Flying Lap ===
Rank	Name	Nation	Time	Notes
1	Marlies Mejías	Cuba	14.286	
2	Sarah Hammer	United States	14.387	
3	Jasmin Glaesser	Canada	14.702	
4	Angie González	Venezuela	14.756	
5	Cristina Irma Greve	Argentina	14.835	
6	Jannie Salcedo	Colombia	14.960	
7	Wellyda Rodrigues	Brazil	15.089	
8	Lizbeth Salazar	Mexico	15.543	
9	Nicolle Bruderer	Guatemala	15.577	
10	Denísse Ahumada	Chile	16.002	
11	Miryam Nuzez Padilla	Ecuador	16.422	
12	Marcela Rubiano	Costa Rica	17.597	

=== Points Race ===
Rank	Name	Nation	Points	Notes
1	Sarah Hammer	United States	44	
2	Jasmin Glaesser	Canada	44	
3	Lizbeth Salazar	Mexico	41	
4	Cristina Irma Greve	Argentina	22	
5	Marlies Mejías	Cuba	16	
6	Angie González	Venezuela	6	
7	Nicolle Bruderer	Guatemala	5	
8	Denísse Ahumada	Chile	-37	
	Miryam Nuzez Padilla	Ecuador	DNF	
	Jannie Salcedo	Colombia	DNF	
	Wellyda Rodrigues	Brazil	DNF	
	Marcela Rubiano	Costa Rica	DNF	

=== Final standings ===
Rank	Name	Nation	Scratch	Pursuit	Elim	Time Trial	Flying Lap	Points	Total	Notes
1st place, gold medalist(s)	Sarah Hammer	United States	34	40	39	38	38	44	233	
2nd place, silver medalist(s)	Jasmin Glaesser	Canada	32	38	39	28	36	44	217	
3rd place, bronze medalist(s)	Marlies Mejías	Cuba	30	36	32	40	40	16	194	
4	Cristina Irma Greve	Argentina	40	34	28	34	32	22	190	
5	Lizbeth Salazar	Mexico	26	32	30	26	26	41	181	
6	Angie González	Venezuela	38	28	34	36	34	6	176	
7	Nicolle Bruderer	Guatemala	24	26	18	24	24	5	121	
8	Denísse Ahumada	Chile	36	30	36	20	22	-37	107	
9	Wellyda Rodrigues	Brazil	22	22	24	30	28	-35	91	
10	Miryam Nuzez Padilla	Ecuador	20	20	20	22	20	-79	23	
11	Jannie Salcedo	Colombia	28	24	26	32	30	-77	DNF	
12	Marcela Rubiano	Costa Rica	-40	18	22	18	18		DNF	
