= Cycling at the 2019 Pan American Games – Men's team sprint =

Men's team sprint at the 2019 Pan American Games
- Venue: Velodrome
- Dates: August 1
- Competitors: 15 from 5 nations

Medalists
Gold medal	Rubén Murillo; Kevin Quintero; Santiago Ramírez	Colombia
Silver medal	Manuel Reséndez; Juan Carlos Ruiz Terán; Edgar Verdugo	Mexico
Bronze medal	Francis Cachique; Robinson Ruiz; Ruben Salinas	Peru

The men's team sprint competition of the cycling events at the 2019 Pan American Games was held on August 1 at the Velodrome.

Teams Trinidad and Tobago and Brazil, which originally won medals, was disqualified for anti-doping rule violations.

== Records ==
Prior to this competition, the existing world and Games records were as follows:

World record	Germany	41.871	Aguascalientes, Mexico	5 December 2013
Games record	Venezuela	43.188	Guadalajara, Mexico	17 October 2011

== Schedule ==
Date	Time	Round
August 1, 2019	12:41	Qualification
August 1, 2019	18:20	Finals

== Results ==
=== Qualification ===
Fastest 4 teams advanced to the final.

Rank	Nation	Name	Time	Notes
1	Trinidad and Tobago	Keron Bramble; Nicholas Paul; Njisane Phillip	44.260	QG
2	Colombia	Rubén Murillo; Kevin Quintero; Santiago Ramírez	45.046	QG
3	Brazil	Flávio Cipriano; João Silva; Kacio Fonseca	45.279	QB
4	Mexico	Manuel Reséndez; Juan Carlos Ruiz Terán; Edgar Verdugo	45.843	QB
5	Peru	Francis Cachique; Robinson Ruiz; Ruben Salinas	49.939	
	Venezuela	Hersony Canelón; César Marcano; Clever Martínez	DNS	

=== Finals ===
The final classification is determined in the medal finals.

Rank	Nation	Name	Time	Notes
Gold medal final
1st place, gold medalist(s)	Colombia	Rubén Murillo; Kevin Quintero; Santiago Ramírez	44.584	
DSQ	Trinidad and Tobago	Keron Bramble; Nicholas Paul; Njisane Phillip	DSQ	
Bronze medal final
2nd place, silver medalist(s)	Mexico	Manuel Reséndez; Juan Carlos Ruiz Terán; Edgar Verdugo		
DSQ	Brazil	Flávio Cipriano; João Silva; Kacio Fonseca	DSQ	
