= Edgar Verdugo =

Mexican cyclist

Personal information
- Full name: Edgar Ismael Verdugo Osuna
- Born: 19 June 1994 (age 32)

Cycling career
- Sport: Cycling
- Discipline: Track
- Role: Rider
- Rider type: Sprinter
Medal record
Representing Mexico
Men's track cycling
Pan American Games
Silver medal – second place	2019 Lima	Team sprint
Bronze medal – third place	2023 Santiago	Team sprint
Pan American Championships
Bronze medal – third place	2021 Lima	Sprint
Bronze medal – third place	2025 Asunción	Team sprint
Central American and Caribbean Games
Gold medal – first place	2023 San Salvador	Team sprint
Gold medal – first place	2026 Santo Domingo	Team sprint
Bronze medal – third place	2014 Veracruz	Team sprint
World Junior Championships
Bronze medal – third place	2012 Invercargill	Team sprint

Edgar Ismael Verdugo Osuna (born 19 June 1994) is a Mexican track cyclist, who specializes in sprinting events. He competed in the keirin event at the 2013 UCI Track Cycling World Championships.
