= Cycling at the 2023 Pan American Games – Men's team sprint =

Men's team sprint at the 2023 Pan American Games
- Venue: Velódromo Peñalolén
- Dates: 24 October
- Competitors: 21 from 7 nations
- Winning time: 43.396

Medalists
Gold medal	Tyler Rorke; Nick Wammes; James Hedgcock	Canada
Silver medal	Carlos Echeverri; Rubén Murillo; Kevin Quintero	Colombia
Bronze medal	Jafet López; Juan Ruiz; Edgar Verdugo	Mexico

The men's team sprint competition of the cycling events at the 2023 Pan American Games was held on 24 October at the Velódromo Peñalolén in Santiago, Chile.

== Records ==
Prior to this competition, the existing world and Games records were as follows:

World record	Netherlands	41.225	Berlin, Germany	26 February 2020
Games record	Venezuela	43.188	Guadalajara, Mexico	17 October 2011

== Schedule ==
All times are local (UTC–3)

Date	Time	Round
24 October 2023	11:41	Qualification
24 October 2023	18:20	Finals

== Results ==
=== Qualification ===
Rank	Nation	Time	Behind	Notes
1	Canada; Tyler Rorke; Nick Wammes; James Hedgcock	43.829		QG
2	Colombia; Carlos Echeverri; Rubén Murillo; Kevin Quintero	43.950	+0.121	QG
3	Mexico; Jafet López; Juan Ruiz; Edgar Verdugo	44.569	+0.740	QB
4	United States; Joshua Hartman; Dalton Walters; Evan Boone	44.636	+0.807	QB
5	Argentina; Juan Rodríguez; Leandro Bottasso; Lucas Vilar	44.670	+0.840	
6	Trinidad and Tobago; Zion Pulido; Kwesi Browne; Nicholas Paul	44.887	+1.058	
7	Chile; Mariano Lecaros; Joaquín Fuenzalida; Diego Fuenzalida	45.960	+2.130	

=== Finals ===
Rank	Nation	Time	Behind	Notes
Gold medal final
1st place, gold medalist(s)	Canada; Tyler Rorke; Nick Wammes; James Hedgcock	43.396		
2nd place, silver medalist(s)	Colombia; Carlos Echeverri; Rubén Murillo; Kevin Quintero	43.421	+0.025	
Bronze medal final
3rd place, bronze medalist(s)	Mexico; Jafet López; Juan Ruiz; Edgar Verdugo	44.037		
4	United States; Joshua Hartman; Dalton Walters; Evan Boone	44.229	+0.192	
