= Arlenis Sierra =

Cuban cyclist (born 1992)

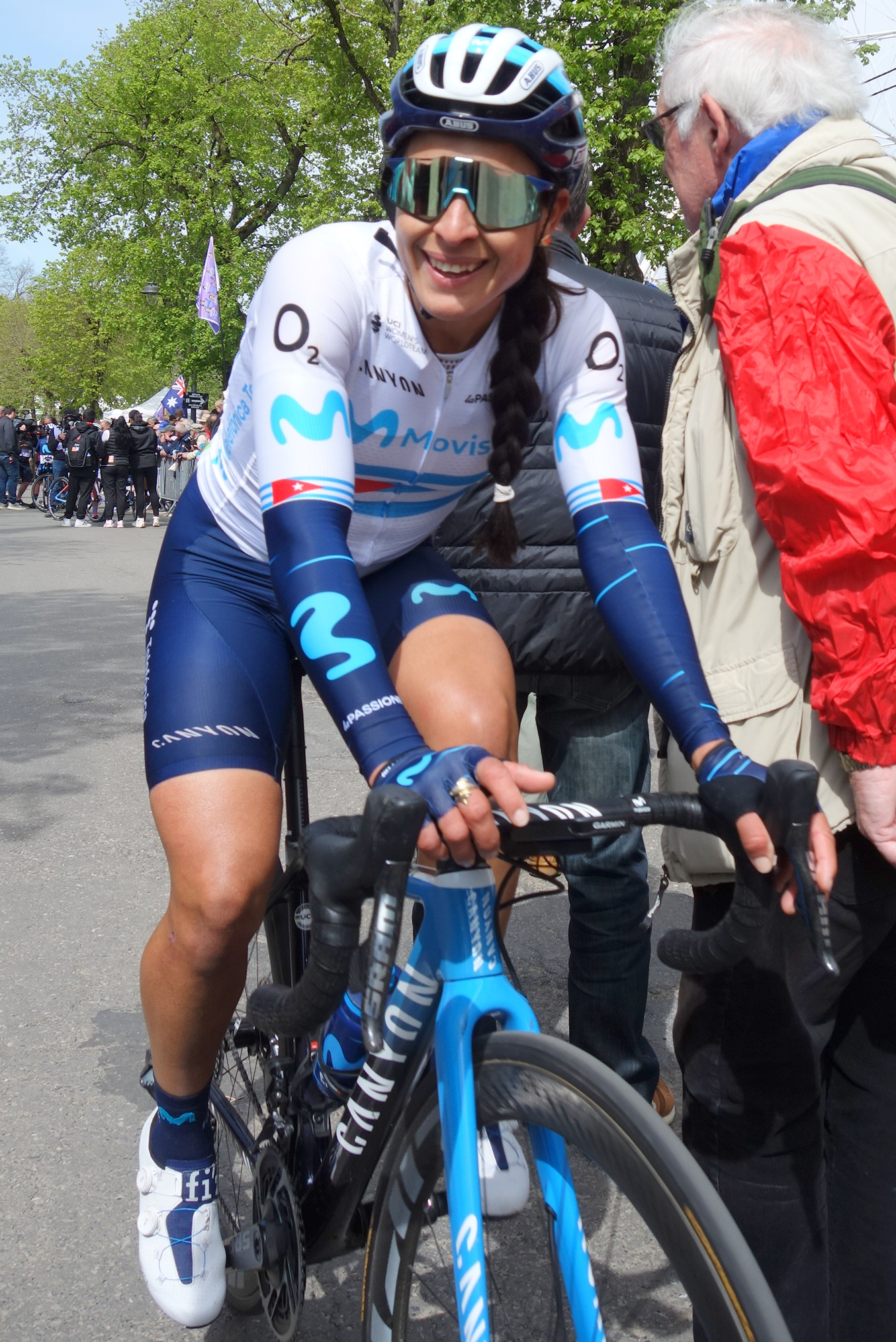
- Sierra in 2022

Personal information
- Full name: Arlenis Sierra Cañadilla
- Born: 7 December 1992 (age 33) Manzanillo, Cuba
- Height: 163 cm (5 ft 4 in)
- Weight: 57 kg (126 lb)

Cycling career
- Sport: Cycling
- Current team: Movistar Team
- Disciplines: Road; Track
- Role: Rider
- Rider type: All-rounder

Amateur team
- 2016: Centre Mondial du Cyclisme

Professional teams
- 2017–2021: Astana
- 2022–: Movistar Team

Major wins
- One day races & Classics National Road Race Championships (2014–2017, 2019) National Time Trial Championships (2017, 2019)
Medal record
Women's track cycling
Representing Cuba
World Championships
Bronze medal – third place	2016 London	Points race
Pan American Games
Bronze medal – third place	2019 Lima	Omnium
Pan American Championships
Gold medal – first place	2013 Mexico City	Team pursuit
Gold medal – first place	2014 Aguascalientes	Scratch
Silver medal – second place	2011 Medellin	Points race
Silver medal – second place	2014 Aguascalientes	Points race
Silver medal – second place	2016 Aguascalientes	Points race
Bronze medal – third place	2015 Santiago	Points race
Bronze medal – third place	2015 Santiago	Scratch
Bronze medal – third place	2016 Aguascalientes	Scratch
Bronze medal – third place	2017 Couva	Team pursuit
Women's road cycling
Pan American Games
Gold medal – first place	2011 Guadalajara	Road race
Gold medal – first place	2019 Lima	Road race
Silver medal – second place	2023 Santiago	Time trial
Pan American Championships
Gold medal – first place	2013 Zacatecas	Road race
Gold medal – first place	2014 Puebla	Road race
Gold medal – first place	2018 San Juan	Road race
Gold medal – first place	2022 San Juan	Road race
Silver medal – second place	2016 Táchira	Road race

Arlenis Sierra Cañadilla (born 7 December 1992) is a Cuban professional racing cyclist, who rides for UCI Women's WorldTeam Movistar Team.

== Major results ==
=== Road ===
2011
1st Road race, Pan American Games
2012
2nd Road race, National Road Championships
2nd Grand Prix GSB
5th Overall Vuelta a El Salvador
7th Grand Prix el Salvador
2013
1st Road race, Pan American Road Championships
2014
1st Road race, Pan American Road Championships
National Road Championships

1st Road race
2nd Time trial

4th Road race, Central American and Caribbean Games
8th Overall Tour de San Luis

1st Stage 5

2015
National Road Championships

1st Road race
2nd Time trial

4th Road race, Pan American Games
4th Road race, Pan American Road Championships
2016
1st Road race, National Road Championships
1st Overall Tour de Bretagne

1st Points classification
1st Young rider classification
1st Stages 1 & 3

1st Overall Vuelta Internacional a Costa Rica

1st Points classification
1st Mountains classification
1st Stages 2 & 3

2nd Road race, Pan American Road Championships
3rd Overall Tour de San Luis

1st Stage 6

2017
National Road Championships

1st Road race
1st Time trial

1st Overall Vuelta Internacional a Costa Rica

1st Points classification
1st Mountains classification
1st Prologue, Stages 1 & 3

2nd Overall Setmana Ciclista Valenciana

1st Points classification
1st Stage 3

2nd Trofeo Alfredo Binda
3rd Overall Tour of California

1st Sprints classification
1st Young rider classification

4th Road race, Pan American Road Championships
10th Overall Giro d'Italia
2018
1st Road race, Pan American Road Championships
1st Time trial, Central American and Caribbean Games
1st Tour of Guangxi
1st Stage 3 Tour of California
1st Stage 2 Tour Cycliste Féminin International de l'Ardèche
2nd Road race, National Road Championships
2nd Winston-Salem Cycling Classic
2nd Giro dell'Emilia
4th Overall Giro della Toscana
4th Gent–Wevelgem
5th Drentse Acht van Westerveld
5th Gran Premio Bruno Beghelli
7th Ronde van Drenthe
2019
Pan American Games

1st Road race
8th Time trial

National Road Championships

1st Road race
1st Time trial

1st Overall Giro della Toscana

1st Points classification
1st Prologue

1st Cadel Evans Great Ocean Road Race
2nd Winston-Salem Cycling Classic
4th Road race, Pan American Road Championships
4th Tour of Guangxi
5th Gran Premio Bruno Beghelli
6th Overall Vuelta a Guatemala

1st Stages 1, 2, 4 & 5

9th Three Days of Bruges–De Panne
2020
2nd Cadel Evans Great Ocean Road Race
3rd Overall Herald Sun Tour

1st Sprints classification
1st Stage 1

10th Race Torquay
2021
1st Overall Giro della Toscana Int. Femminile – Memorial Michela Fanini

1st Points classification
1st Prologue & Stage 1

1st Clasica Navarra
1st Tre Valli Varesine
2nd Giro dell'Emilia
5th Road race, UCI Road World Championships
6th Scheldeprijs
6th Durango-Durango Emakumeen Saria
8th Overall Tour Cycliste Féminin International de l'Ardèche

1st Stage 1

2022
1st Road race, Pan American Road Championships
1st Overall Vuelta a Andalucía

1st Points classification
1st Stages 1 & 2

1st Stage 1 Tour de Romandie
4th Tour of Flanders
4th Giro dell'Emilia Internazionale Donne Elite
5th Tre Valli Varesine
6th Road race, UCI Road World Championships
7th Liège–Bastogne–Liège
9th Dwars door Vlaanderen
2023
Central American and Caribbean Games

1st Road race
1st Time trial

Pan American Games

2nd Time trial
5th Road race

4th Trofeo Alfredo Binda-Comune di Cittiglio
4th Clásica de Almería
5th Nokere Koerse
7th Tre Valli Varesine
10th Tour of Flanders
2024
National Road Championships

1st Road race
1st Time trial

1st Stage 4 Vuelta a Andalucía
2nd Trofeo Felanitx-Colònia de Sant Jordi (Ses Salines)
2nd Clasica Femenina Navarra
6th Gent–Wevelgem
8th Overall Itzulia
8th Dwars door Vlaanderen
2026
9th Paris–Roubaix

==== Major championship results timeline ====
Event		2010	2011	2012	2013	2014	2015	2016	2017	2018	2019	2020	2021	2022
Olympic Games	Road race	Not held		—	Not held			28	Not held				34	NH
World Championships	Time trial	—	—	—	—	—	—	—	—	—	—	23	—	—
World Championships	Road race	—	—	—	—	—	—	—	—	27	12	39	5	6
Pan American Championships	Road race	NH	31	—	1	1	4	2	4	1	4	NH	—	1
Pan American Games	Time trial	NH	—	Not held			—	Not held			8	Not held		
Pan American Games	Road race	NH	1	Not held			4	Not held			1	Not held		
National Championships	Time trial	Not held				2	Not held		1	—	1	Not held		—
National Championships	Road race	4	NH	2	NH	1	1	1	1	2	1	Not held		—

=== Track ===
2011
2nd Points race, Pan American Track Championships
2013
1st Team pursuit, Pan American Track Championships
2014
Central American and Caribbean Games

1st Team pursuit (with Yudelmis Domínguez, Yumari González and Marlies Mejías)
3rd Scratch

Pan American Track Championships

1st Scratch
2nd Points race

2015
1st Scratch, 2015–16 UCI Track Cycling World Cup, Cali
Pan American Track Championships

3rd Points race
3rd Scratch

2016
Pan American Track Championships

2nd Points race
3rd Scratch

3rd Points race, UCI Track Cycling World Championships
2017
3rd Team pursuit, Pan American Track Championships
2018
Central American and Caribbean Games

1st Team pursuit (with Yudelmis Domínguez, Maylin Sánchez and Marlies Mejías)
1st Madison (with Yudelmis Domínguez)
2nd Individual pursuit
3rd Points race

2019
3rd Omnium, Pan American Games
