= Yuliet Rodríguez Jiménez =

Cuban cyclist

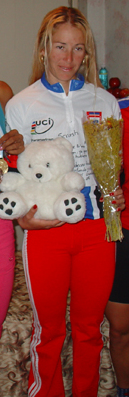

Personal information
- Full name: Yuliet Rodríguez Jiménez
- Nickname: Yulie
- Born: August 24, 1977 (age 49) Cuba
- Height: 1.68 m (5 ft 6 in)
- Weight: 55 kg (121 lb; 8.7 st)

Cycling career
- Sport: Cycling
- Current team: Cuban National
- Disciplines: Track, road
- Role: Rider

Major wins
- UCI Pan-American Continental Championships - Road Race

Yuliet Rodríguez Jiménez (born August 24, 1977) is a former Cuban racing cyclist. She established herself as one of the most consistent Latin American cyclists in a country that has produced great female racers since the sport was first introduced to Cuban women in the mid-1980s.

== Cycling experience ==
A member of the Cuban national team since 1995, Rodríguez claimed over a dozen national titles in the time trial, the 3.000m pursuit, the points race and the road race, as well as six victories in the Copa 8 de Marzo, Cuba's annual stage race for women. Rodríguez's most recent national championship victory was in the 2005 women's road race.

Rodríguez finished 9th in the women's Giro d'Italia, and in the same year took 10th overall in the Vuelta a España. She also represented Cuba at the 1999 Pan American Games in Winnipeg, Canada, and the 1995 Junior World Championships in Italy. She was 2nd overall in the Tour of Mexico and Pan American Champion in the road race.

Rodríguez won the Tour de Guadeloupe in 1997 and 1998 and was third at the time trial in the Central American and Caribbean Games in Maracaibo, Venezuela.

In 2001, Rodríguez won three medals (two silver and one bronze) at the UCI Pan American Cycling Championships in Medellín, Colombia. She has also raced in different World Cup races on the track in Mexico and Colombia. Her personal best in the 3.000m pursuit is 3:43, set in Cali, Colombia. Rodríguez is an excellent climber, time trialist and stage racer.

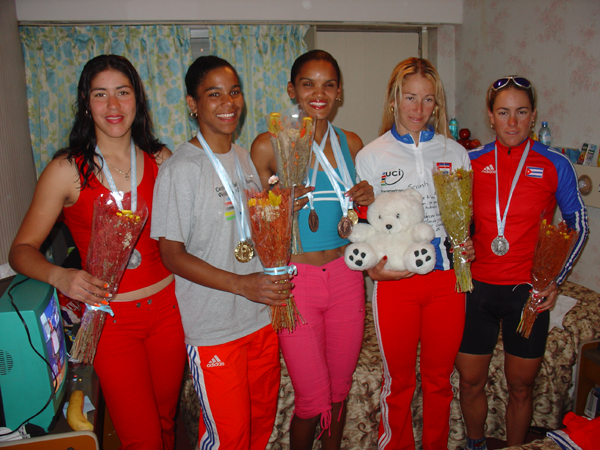
Cuban National Cycling Team

=== Race results ===
==== 2004-2006 ====
- 1st Copa 8 de Marzo (2005, 2006)
- 1st Cuban National Championships – Road Race
- 1st Cuban National Championships – Points Race
- 1st Cuban National Championships – Scratch Race
- 1st ALBA Games – Road Race
- 1st ALBA Games – Time Trial
- 2nd Vuelta a Habana del Este
- 2nd ALBA Games – Scratch Race
- 3rd ALBA Games – Points Race
- 3rd Cuban National Championships – Individual Pursuit
- 7th UCI Pan-Am Continental Championships – Time Trial

==== 2003 ====
- 1st Cuban National Championships – Time Trial
- 2nd Cuban National Championships – Road Race
- 2nd Vuelta a Habana del Este
- 3rd Cuban National Championships – Points Race

==== 2002 ====
- 2nd Copa 8 de Marzo
- 2nd Cuban National Championships – Time Trial
- 2nd Vuelta a Habana del Este
- 3rd Cuban National Championships – Road Race

==== 2001 ====
- 1st Cuban National Championships – Road Race
- 1st Cuban National Championships – Time Trial
- 1st Copa 8 de Marzo
- 2nd UCI Pan-Am Continental Championships – Individual Pursuit
- 2nd UCI Pan-Am Continental Championships – Points Race
- 3rd UCI Pan-Am Continental Championships – Time Trial

==== 2000 ====
- 1st Cuban National Championships – Time Trial
- 1st Vuelta a Habana del Este
- 2nd Cuban National Championships – Road Race
- 2nd Copa 8 de Marzo

==== 1999 ====
- 1st Cuban National Championships – Road Race
- 1st Cuban National Championships – Time Trial
- 1st Copa 8 de Marzo
- 1st Vuelta a Habana del Este
- 4th Pan American Games – Road Race
- 6th Vuelta a España – Points Classification
- 9th Giro d'Italia – General Classification
- 10th Vuelta a España – General Classification

==== 1998 ====
- 1st Cuban National Championships – Road Race
- 1st Cuban National Championships – Time Trial
- 1st Copa 8 de Marzo
- 2nd Cuban National Championships – Points Race
- 3rd Cuban National Championships – Individual Pursuit
- 3rd CAC Games – Time Trial
- 4th CAC Games – Road Race

==== 1997 ====
- 1st UCI Pan-Am Continental Championships – Road Race
- 1st Cuban National Championships – Road Race
- 1st Cuban National Championships – Time Trial
- 1st Copa 8 de Marzo
- 1st Tour of Guadeloupe
- 3rd UCI Pan-Am Continental Championships – Time Trial

==== 1996 ====
- 1st Cuban National Championships – Road Race
- 1st Cuban National Championships – Time Trial
- 1st Cuban National Championships – Points Race
- 1st Tour of Guadeloupe
- 3rd Cuban National Championships – Individual Pursuit
- 3rd UCI Pan-Am Continental Championships – Time Trial
- 3rd UCI Pan-Am Continental Championships – Road Race

==== 1995 ====
- 1st Cuban National Championships – Time Trial
- 2nd Tour of Mexico
- 2nd Cuban National Championships – Road Race
- 5th Junior World Championships – Road Race
- 5th Junior World Championships – Individual Pursuit

== Other ==
Rodríguez Jiménez is the wife of former US professional cyclist Joseph M. Papp; the two were married in Havana, Cuba on October 8, 2004. In 2006, Rodríguez defected from Cuba while in Russia in an attempt to reunite with her husband who was in Italy. After a global flight that included weeks spent in hiding and the use of an assumed identity, Rodríguez was kidnapped in Caracas, Venezuela by Cuban security agents operating with approval from the Chavez regime, held incommunicado for 20 days and finally forcibly repatriated to Cuba.
