= Yudelmis Domínguez =

Cuban cyclist (born 1985)

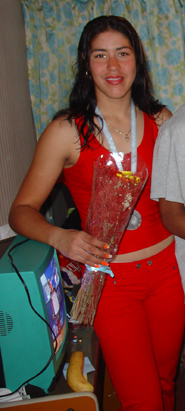

Personal information
- Full name: Yudelmis Domínguez Masague
- Born: 19 January 1985 (age 41)

Cycling career
- Sport: Cycling
- Role: Rider
Medal record
Representing Cuba
Women's road cycling
Pan American Games
Bronze medal – third place	2011 Guadalajara	Road race
Women's track cycling
Pan American Games
Silver medal – second place	2011 Guadalajara	Team pursuit
Pan American Championships
Gold medal – first place	2009 Mexico City	Team pursuit
Gold medal – first place	2011 Medellin	Team pursuit
Gold medal – first place	2013 Mexico City	Points race
Gold medal – first place	2013 Mexico City	Team pursuit
Silver medal – second place	2005 Mar del Plata	Points race
Silver medal – second place	2010 Aguascalientes	Team pursuit
Silver medal – second place	2011 Medellin	Individual pursuit
Silver medal – second place	2013 Mexico City	Individual pursuit
Silver medal – second place	2014 Aguascalientes	Team pursuit
Bronze medal – third place	2006 São Paulo	Individual pursuit
Bronze medal – third place	2009 Mexico City	Individual pursuit
Bronze medal – third place	2013 Mexico City	Scratch
Central American and Caribbean Games
Gold medal – first place	2014 Veracruz	Team pursuit
Silver medal – second place	2014 Veracruz	Individual pursuit
Silver medal – second place	2014 Veracruz	Points race

Yudelmis Domínguez Masague (born 19 January 1985) is a Cuban professional racing cyclist. She rode at the 2013 and 2015 UCI Track Cycling World Championships. She competed at the 2014 Central American and Caribbean Games in Veracruz, Mexico.

== Major results ==
2013
Copa Cuba de Pista

1st Team Pursuit (with Yumari Gonzalez Valdivieso, Marlies Mejias Garcia and Arlenis Sierra)
3rd Omnium
3rd Scratch Race

2014
Central American and Caribbean Games

1st Team Pursuit (with Yumari Gonzalez Valdivieso, Marlies Mejias Garcia and Arlenis Sierra)
2nd Individual Pursuit
2nd Points Race

2nd Team Pursuit, Pan American Track Championships (with Yoanka Gonzalez Perez, Yumari Gonzalez Valdivieso and Marlies Mejias Garcia)
