= Marlies Mejías =

Cuban cyclist

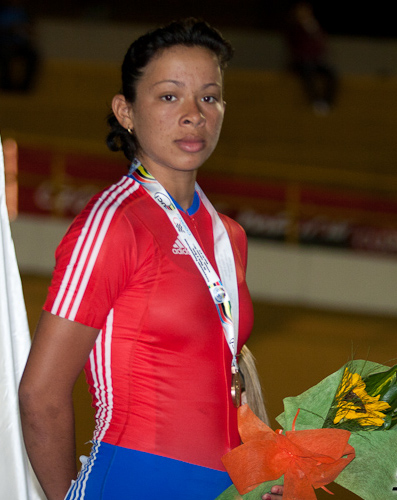
- Marlies Mejías in 2011

Personal information
- Full name: Marlies Mejías García
- Born: 29 December 1992 (age 33) Güira de Melena, Cuba
- Height: 1.68 m (5 ft 6 in)
- Weight: 60 kg (132 lb)

Cycling career
- Sport: Cycling
- Current team: Virginia's Blue Ridge–Twenty28
- Disciplines: Road; Track
- Role: Rider

Professional teams
- 2017: Weber Shimano Ladies Power
- 2018: Twenty20 p/b Sho-Air
- 2023–: Virginia's Blue Ridge–Twenty24
Medal record
Representing Cuba
Women's road cycling
Pan American Games
| Silver medal – second place | 2015 Toronto | Road race |
Pan American Championships
| Gold medal – first place | 2015 León | Road race |
| Gold medal – first place | 2021 Santo Domingo | Time trial |
| Silver medal – second place | 2013 Zacatecas | Road race |
| Bronze medal – third place | 2017 Santo Domingo | Time trial |
| Bronze medal – third place | 2018 San Juan | Road race |
Central American and Caribbean Games
| Gold medal – first place | 2026 Santo Domingo | Road race |
| Gold medal – first place | 2026 Santo Domingo | Time trial |
Women's track cycling
Pan American Games
| Silver medal – second place | 2015 Toronto | Team sprint |
| Bronze medal – third place | 2011 Guadalajara | Omnium |
| Bronze medal – third place | 2015 Toronto | Omnium |
Pan American Championships
| Gold medal – first place | 2011 Medellin | Omnium |
| Gold medal – first place | 2011 Medellin | Team pursuit |
| Gold medal – first place | 2012 Mar del Plata | Omnium |
| Gold medal – first place | 2013 Mexico City | Omnium |
| Gold medal – first place | 2013 Mexico City | Individual pursuit |
| Gold medal – first place | 2013 Mexico City | Team pursuit |
| Gold medal – first place | 2016 Aguascalientes | Omnium |
| Silver medal – second place | 2012 Mar del Plata | Individual pursuit |
| Silver medal – second place | 2014 Aguascalientes | Individual pursuit |
| Silver medal – second place | 2014 Aguascalientes | Omnium |
| Silver medal – second place | 2014 Aguascalientes | Team pursuit |
| Silver medal – second place | 2016 Aguascalientes | Individual pursuit |
| Silver medal – second place | 2017 Balmain | Scratch |
| Silver medal – second place | 2018 Aguascalientes | Individual pursuit |
| Silver medal – second place | 2018 Aguascalientes | Scratch |
| Silver medal – second place | 2025 Asunción | Scratch |
| Silver medal – second place | 2026 Santiago | Scratch |
| Silver medal – second place | 2026 Santiago | Elimination race |
| Bronze medal – third place | 2011 Medellin | Individual pursuit |
| Bronze medal – third place | 2014 Aguascalientes | Team sprint |
| Bronze medal – third place | 2017 Balmain | Team pursuit |
| Bronze medal – third place | 2018 Aguascalientes | Points race |
| Bronze medal – third place | 2026 Santiago | Points Race |
Central American and Caribbean Games
| Silver medal – second place | 2026 Santo Domingo | Omnium |

Marlies Mejías García (born 29 December 1992) is a Cuban road and track cyclist, who currently rides for UCI Women's Continental Team Virginia's Blue Ridge–Twenty28. At the 2012 Summer Olympics, she competed in the Women's Omnium, finishing in 8th place overall.

== Major results ==
=== Road ===
2010
2nd Road race, National Road Championships
2012
3rd Road race, National Road Championships
5th Road race, Pan American Road Championships
5th Copa Fundadeporte
10th Clasico Fundadeporte
2013
2nd Road race, Pan American Road Championships
2014
1st Road race, Central American and Caribbean Games
National Road Championships

2nd Road race
3rd Time trial

5th Overall Tour Femenino de San Luis

1st Young rider classification

7th Road race, Pan American Road Championships
2015
1st Road race, Pan American Road Championships
National Road Championships

1st Time trial
2nd Road race

2nd Road race, Pan American Games
2016
3rd Road race, National Road Championships
2017
1st Overall Tour Internacional Femenino de Uruguay

1st Stages 1, 2 & 4

1st Overall Vuelta Femenina a San Juan

1st Stages 1, 2, 3 (ITT) & 4

1st Overall Armed Forces Association Cycling Classic

1st Stage 1

1st Overall Intelligentsia Cup

1st Stages 1, 2, 6, 7, 9 & 10

1st Wilmington Grand Prix
North Star Grand Prix

1st Stages 4 & 6

1st Stage 9 Tour of America's Dairyland
3rd Time trial, Pan American Road Championships
2018
National Road Championships

1st Time trial
5th Road race

Pan American Road Championships

3rd Road race
8th Time trial

2021
1st Time trial, Pan American Road Championships
2023
1st Stage 1 Redlands Bicycle Classic
2nd Overall Valley of the Sun Stage Race

1st Stage 2

8th Overall Joe Martin Stage Race

1st Stage 4

10th Overall Tour of the Gila

1st Stage 2

2024
Tour of the Gila

1st Points classification
1st Stage 2

1st Stages 1 (ITT) & 3 Tucson Bicycle Classic
2nd Overall Valley of the Sun Stage Race

1st Stage 3

2nd Tour de Gatineau

=== Track ===
2010
3rd Individual pursuit, UCI Junior Track Cycling World Championships
2011
Pan American Track Championships

1st Omnium
1st Team pursuit
3rd Individual pursuit

3rd Omnium, Pan American Games
2012
Pan American Track Championships

1st Omnium
2nd Individual pursuit

2013
Pan American Track Championships

1st Individual pursuit
1st Omnium
1st Team pursuit

Copa Cuba de Pista

1st Omnium
1st Team pursuit (with Yudelmis Domínguez, Yumari González and Arlenis Sierra)

2014
Central American and Caribbean Games

1st Individual pursuit
1st Omnium
1st Team pursuit (with Yudelmis Domínguez, Yumari González and Arlenis Sierra)
1st Team sprint (with Lisandra Guerra)

Copa Cuba de Pista

1st Omnium
1st Scratch
3rd Points race

2nd Omnium, 2014–15 UCI Track Cycling World Cup, Guadalajara
Pan American Track Championships

2nd Individual pursuit
2nd Omnium
2nd Team pursuit (with Yudelmis Domínguez, Yoanka González and Yumari González)
3rd Team sprint (with Lisandra Guerra)

2015
1st Omnium, Copa Cuba de Pista
Pan American Games

2nd Team sprint (with Lisandra Guerra)
3rd Omnium

2016
Pan American Track Championships

1st Omnium
2nd Individual pursuit

Copa Cuba de Pista

1st Omnium
1st Team pursuit (with Iraida Garcia Ocasio, Maylin Sánchez and Claudia Barco)
3rd Scratch

2017
Pan American Track Championships

2nd Scratch
3rd Team pursuit

2018
Central American and Caribbean Games

1st Team pursuit (with Yudelmis Domínguez, Maylin Sánchez and Arlenis Sierra)
1st Scratch
1st Individual pursuit

Pan American Track Championships

2nd Individual pursuit
2nd Scratch
3rd Points race
