= 2026 UCI Track Cycling World Championships – Women's team sprint =

Women's team sprint at the 2026 UCI Track Cycling World Championships
- Venue: Shanghai Velodrome
- Location: Shanghai, China
- Dates: 14 October
- Competitors: 57 from 18 nations
- Teams: 18
- Winning time: 45.578

Medalists
gold medal	Jiang Yulu; Tong Mengqi; Yuan Liying; Luo Xuehuang	China
silver medal	Sophie Capewell; Emma Finucane; Rhianna Parris-Smith	Great Britain
bronze medal	Lea Friedrich; Pauline Grabosch; Clara Schneider	Germany

The women's team sprint competition at the 2026 UCI Track Cycling World Championships was held on 14 October 2026.

== Results ==
=== Qualifying ===
The qualifying was started at 14:26. The eight fastest teams advanced to the first round.

Rank	Nation	Time	Behind	Notes
1	Great Britain; Rhianna Parris-Smith; Sophie Capewell; Emma Finucane	45.842		Q
2	China; Tong Mengqi; Yuan Liying; Jiang Yulu	45.912	+0.070	Q
3	Germany; Clara Schneider; Lea Friedrich; Pauline Grabosch	46.303	+0.461	Q
4	Individual Neutral Athletes; Natalia Antonova; Alina Lysenko; Yana Burlakova	46.533	+0.691	Q
5	Australia; Kristina Clonan; Molly McGill; Alessia McCaig	46.691	+0.849	Q
6	Netherlands; Kimberly Kalee; Hetty van de Wouw; Steffie van der Peet	46.981	+1.139	Q
7	New Zealand; Olivia King; Rebecca Petch; Ellesse Andrews	47.083	+1.241	Q
8	France; Taky Marie-Divine Kouamé; Marie-Louisa Drouode; Mathilde Gros	47.547	+1.705	Q
9	Poland; Marlena Karwacka; Nikola Seremak; Nikola Sibiak	48.051	+2.209	
10	United States; Emily Hayes; Hayley Yoslov; McKenna McKee	48.097	+2.255	
11	Malaysia; Nurul Aliana Syafika Azizan; Nurul Izzah Izzati Mohd Asri; Nur Alyssa Mohd Farid	48.366	+2.524	
12	Belgium; Elke Vanhoof; Nicky Degrendele; Zita Gheysens	48.376	+2.534	
13	Czechia; Sára Peterková; Veronika Tamme; Anna Jaborníková	48.902	+3.060	
14	Ukraine; Viktoriia Polishchuk; Alla Biletska; Oleksandra Lohviniuk	49.018	+3.176	
15	Mexico; María José Vizcaíno; Yuli Verdugo; Daniela Gaxiola	49.029	+3.187	
16	Italy; Matilde Cenci; Miriam Vece; Rachele Barbieri	49.208	+3.366	
17	Hong Kong; Ng Sze Wing; Yeung Cho Yiu; Phoebe Tung	49.926	+4.084	
18	Japan; Aki Sakai; Mina Sato; Minami Yamada	50.680	+4.838	

=== First round ===
The first round was started at 18:35.

First round heats were held as follows:
Heat 1: 4th v 5th fastest
Heat 2: 3rd v 6th fastest
Heat 3: 2nd v 7th fastest
Heat 4: 1st v 8th fastest

The heat winners were ranked on time, from which the top two advanced to the gold medal race and the other two proceeded to the bronze medal race.

Rank	Heat	Nation	Time	Notes
1	1	Individual Neutral Athletes; Natalia Antonova; Yana Burlakova; Alina Lysenko	46.428	QB
2	1	Australia; Kristina Clonan; Alessia McCaig; Molly McGill	47.027	
1	2	Germany; Lea Friedrich; Pauline Grabosch; Clara Schneider	46.276	QB
2	2	Netherlands; Kimberly Kalee; Hetty van de Wouw; Steffie van der Peet	46.476	
1	3	China; Jiang Yulu; Luo Xuehuang; Yuan Liying	45.646	QG
2	3	New Zealand; Ellesse Andrews; Olivia King; Rebecca Petch	46.979	
1	4	Great Britain; Sophie Capewell; Emma Finucane; Rhianna Parris-Smith	45.926	QG
2	4	France; Marie-Louisa Drouode; Mathilde Gros; Axelle Étienne	48.718	

=== Finals ===
The finals were started at 19:55.

Rank	Nation	Time	Behind	Notes
Gold medal race
1st place, gold medalist(s)	China; Jiang Yulu; Tong Mengqi; Yuan Liying	45.578		
2nd place, silver medalist(s)	Great Britain; Sophie Capewell; Emma Finucane; Rhianna Parris-Smith	45.933	+0.355	
Bronze medal race
3rd place, bronze medalist(s)	Germany; Lea Friedrich; Pauline Grabosch; Clara Schneider	46.276		
4	Individual Neutral Athletes; Yana Burlakova; Ekaterina Evlanova; Alina Lysenko	46.712	+0.436	
