= 2026 UCI Track Cycling World Championships – Women's sprint =

Women's sprint at the 2026 UCI Track Cycling World Championships
- Venue: Shanghai Velodrome
- Location: Shanghai, China
- Dates: 15–16 October
- Competitors: 35 from 21 nations

Medalists
gold medal	Yuan Liying	China
silver medal	Emma Finucane	Great Britain
bronze medal	Mina Sato	Japan

The Women's sprint competition at the 2026 UCI Track Cycling World Championships was held on 15 and 16 October 2026.

== Results ==
=== Qualifying ===
The qualifying was started on 15 October at 12:27. The top four riders advanced directly to the 1/8 finals; places 5 to 28 advanced to the 1/16 final.

Rank	Name	Nation	Time	Behind	Notes
1	Yuan Liying	China	10.148		Q
2	Sophie Capewell	Great Britain	10.265	+0.117	Q
3	Emma Finucane	Great Britain	10.288	+0.140	Q
4	Lea Friedrich	Germany	10.349	+0.201	Q
5	Pauline Grabosch	Germany	10.353	+0.205	Q
6	Hetty van de Wouw	Netherlands	10.387	+0.239	Q
7	Jiang Yulu	China	10.396	+0.248	Q
8	Alina Lysenko	Individual Neutral Athletes	10.413	+0.265	Q
9	Wang Lijuan	China	10.429	+0.281	Q
10	Rhianna Parris-Smith	Great Britain	10.458	+0.310	Q
11	Yana Burlakova	Individual Neutral Athletes	10.493	+0.345	Q
12	Mina Sato	Japan	10.493	+0.345	Q
13	Mathilde Gros	France	10.507	+0.359	Q
14	Ellesse Andrews	New Zealand	10.518	+0.370	Q
15	Lauriane Genest	Canada	10.642	+0.494	Q
16	Molly McGill	Australia	10.651	+0.503	Q
17	Nurul Izzah Izzati Mohd Asri	Malaysia	10.667	+0.519	Q
18	Kelsey Mitchell	Canada	10.719	+0.571	Q
19	Stefany Cuadrado	Colombia	10.746	+0.598	Q
20	Veronika Tamme	Czechia	10.749	+0.601	Q
21	Alessia McCaig	Australia	10.767	+0.619	Q
22	Aki Sakai	Japan	10.773	+0.625	Q
23	Nur Alyssa Mohd Farid	Malaysia	10.788	+0.640	Q
24	Steffie van der Peet	Netherlands	10.842	+0.694	Q
25	Alla Biletska	Ukraine	10.877	+0.729	Q
26	Nicky Degrendele	Belgium	10.903	+0.755	Q
27	Miriam Vece	Italy	10.940	+0.792	Q
28	Olivia King	New Zealand	10.948	+0.800	Q
29	Kimberly Kalee	Netherlands	10.990	+0.842	
30	Daniela Gaxiola	Mexico	11.010	+0.862	
31	Nikola Sibiak	Poland	11.027	+0.879	
32	Zita Gheysens	Belgium	11.046	+0.898	
33	Yeung Cho Yiu	Hong Kong	11.104	+0.956	
34	McKenna McKee	United States	11.109	+0.961	
35	Makaira Wallace	Trinidad and Tobago	11.158	+1.010	

=== 1/16 finals ===
The 1/16 finals was started on 15 October at 13:45.

Heat	Rank	Name	Nation	Gap	Notes
1	1	Pauline Grabosch	Germany		Q
1	2	Olivia King	New Zealand	+0.283	
2	1	Hetty van de Wouw	Netherlands		Q
2	2	Miriam Vece	Italy	+0.510	
3	1	Jiang Yulu	China		
3	2	Nicky Degrendele	Belgium	+0.085	
4	1	Alina Lysenko	Individual Neutral Athletes		Q
4	2	Alla Biletska	Ukraine	+0.168	
5	1	Wang Lijuan	China		Q
5	2	Steffie van der Peet	Netherlands	+0.146	
6	1	Rhianna Parris-Smith	Great Britain		Q
6	2	Nur Alyssa Mohd Farid	Malaysia	+0.071	
7	1	Yana Burlakova	Individual Neutral Athletes		Q
7	2	Aki Sakai	Japan	+0.074	
8	1	Mina Sato	Japan		Q
8	2	Alessia McCaig	Australia	+0.100	
9	1	Mathilde Gros	France		Q
9	2	Veronika Tamme	Czechia	+1.038	
10	1	Ellesse Andrews	New Zealand		Q
10	2	Stefany Cuadrado	Colombia	+0.061	
11	1	Kelsey Mitchell	Canada		Q
11	2	Lauriane Genest	Canada	+0.039	
12	1	Molly McGill	Australia		Q
12	2	Nurul Izzah Izzati Mohd Asri	Malaysia	+0.043	

=== 1/8 finals ===
The 1/8 finals was started on 15 October at 14:37.

Heat	Rank	Name	Nation	Gap	Notes
1	1	Yuan Liying	China		Q
1	2	Molly McGill	Australia	+0.304	
2	1	Sophie Capewell	Great Britain		Q
2	2	Kelsey Mitchell	Canada	+0.070	
3	1	Emma Finucane	Great Britain		Q
3	2	Ellesse Andrews	New Zealand	+0.119	
4	1	Lea Friedrich	Germany		Q
4	2	Mathilde Gros	France	+0.020	
5	1	Mina Sato	Japan		Q
5	2	Pauline Grabosch	Germany	+0.122	
6	1	Hetty van de Wouw	Netherlands		Q
6	2	Yana Burlakova	Individual Neutral Athletes	+0.089	
7	1	Jiang Yulu	China		Q
7	2	Rhianna Parris-Smith	Great Britain	+0.075	
8	1	Alina Lysenko	Individual Neutral Athletes		Q
8	2	Wang Lijuan	China	+0.077	

=== Quarterfinals ===
The quarterfinals were started on 15 October at 17:33.

Heat	Rank	Name	Nation	Race 1	Race 2	Decider (i.r.)	Notes
1	1	Yuan Liying	China	X	X		Q
1	2	Alina Lysenko	Individual Neutral Athletes	+0.120	+0.090		
2	1	Sophie Capewell	Great Britain	X	X		Q
2	2	Jiang Yulu	China	+0.402	+0.055		
3	1	Emma Finucane	Great Britain	X	X		Q
3	2	Hetty van de Wouw	Netherlands	+0.011	+0.090		
4	1	Mina Sato	Japan	X	X		Q
4	2	Lea Friedrich	Germany	+0.118	+0.022		

=== Semifinals ===
The semifinals were started on 16 October at 17:57.

Heat	Rank	Name	Nation	Race 1	Race 2	Decider (i.r.)	Notes
1	1	Yuan Liying	China	X	X		QG
1	2	Mina Sato	Japan	+1.410	+0.352		QB
2	1	Emma Finucane	Great Britain	X	X		QG
2	2	Sophie Capewell	Great Britain	+0.340	+0.063		QB

=== Finals ===
The finals were started on 16 October at 17:57.

Rank	Name	Nation	Race 1	Race 2	Decider (i.r.)
Gold medal race
1st place, gold medalist(s)	Yuan Liying	China	X	X	
2nd place, silver medalist(s)	Emma Finucane	Great Britain	+0.025	+0.776	
Bronze medal race
3rd place, bronze medalist(s)	Mina Sato	Japan	X	+0.017	X
4	Sophie Capewell	Great Britain	+0.235	X	+0.000
