= Track cycling at the 2026 Commonwealth Games – Women's sprint =

Cycling Track – Women's sprint at the 2026 Commonwealth Games
- Venue: Sir Chris Hoy Velodrome
- Dates: 31 July

Medalists
gold medal	Emma Finucane	Wales
silver medal	Sophie Capewell	England
bronze medal	Rhian Edmunds	Wales

The women's sprint at the 2026 Commonwealth Games was part of the cycling programme, and took place on 31 July 2026.

== Records ==
Prior to this competition, the existing world and Games records were as follows:

World record	(United Kingdom) Emma Finucane	9.756	Konya Velodrome, Konya	2 February 2026
Games record	(Australia) Stephanie Morton	10.524	Meares Velodrome, Brisbane	6 Aprik 2018

== Schedule ==
The schedule is as follows:

All times are British Summer Time (UTC+1)

Date	Time	Round
Friday 31 July 2026	10:00	Qualifying
Friday 31 July 2026	11:45	1/8 finals
Friday 31 July 2026	12:13	Quarterfinals
Friday 31 July 2026	16:25	Semifinals
Friday 31 July 2026	18:41	Finals

== Results ==
=== Qualifying ===
Top 16 riders qualified for the 1/8 finals.

Rank	Riders	Time	Behind	Notes
1	Emma Finucane (WAL)	10.322	—	Q, GR
2	Sophie Capewell (ENG)	10.458	+0.136	Q
3	Rhianna Parris-Smith (ENG)	10.514	+0.192	Q
4	Lauren Bell (SCO)	10.543	+0.221	Q
5	Rhian Edmunds (WAL)	10.622	+0.300	Q
6	Iona Moir (SCO)	10.649	+0.327	Q
7	Katy Marchant (ENG)	10.671	+0.349	Q
8	Alessia McCaig (AUS)	10.677	+0.355	Q
9	Ellesse Andrews (NZL)	10.692	+0.370	Q
10	Molly McGill (AUS)	10.697	+0.375	Q
11	Nurul Izzah Izzati Mohd Asri (MAS)	10.706	+0.384	Q
12	Liliya Tatarinoff (AUS)	10.816	+0.494	Q
13	Lowri Thomas (WAL)	10.825	+0.503	Q
14	Olivia King (NZL)	10.832	+0.510	Q
15	Nur Alyssa Mohd Farid (MAS)	10.882	+0.560	Q
16	Rebecca Petch (NZL)	10.926	+0.604	Q
17	Ellie Stone (SCO)	10.955	+0.633	
18	Sarah Orban (CAN)	11.073	+0.751	
19	Dahlia Palmer (JAM)	12.422	+2.100	
20	Monica Jelimo Kiplagat (KEN)	15.623	+5.301	
21	Nancy Debe (KEN)	16.150	+5.828	
22	Erica Sedzro (GHA)	17.212	+6.890	

=== 1/8 finals ===
Heat winners advanced to the quarterfinals.

Heat	Rank	Riders	Gap	Notes
1	1	Emma Finucane (WAL)	—	Q
1	2	Rebecca Petch (NZL)	+0.337	
2	1	Sophie Capewell (ENG)	—	Q
2	2	Nur Alyssa Mohd Farid (MAS)	+0.050	
3	1	Rhianna Parris-Smith (ENG)	—	Q
3	2	Olivia King (NZL)	+0.066	
4	1	Lauren Bell (SCO)	—	Q
4	2	Lowri Thomas (WAL)	+0.0.65	
5	1	Rhian Edmunds (WAL)	—	Q
5	2	Liliya Tatarinoff (AUS)	+0.039	
6	1	Nurul Izzah Izzati Mohd Asri (MAS)	—	Q
6	2	Iona Moir (SCO)	+0.126	
7	1	Katy Marchant (ENG)	—	Q
7	2	Molly McGill (AUS)	+0.012	
8	1	Ellesse Andrews (NZL)	—	Q
8	2	Alessia McCaig (AUS)	+0.127	

=== Quarterfinals ===
Matches are extended to a best-of-three format hereon; winners proceed to the semifinals.

Heat	Rank	Riders	Race 1	Race 2	Decider (i.r.)	Notes
1	1	Emma Finucane (WAL)	X	X		Q
1	2	Ellesse Andrews (NZL)	+0.587	+0.160		
2	1	Sophie Capewell (ENG)	X	X		Q
2	2	Katy Marchant (ENG)	+0.075	+0.354		
3	1	Nurul Izzah Izzati Mohd Asri (MAS)	+0.047	X	X	Q
3	2	Rhianna Parris-Smith (ENG)	X	+0.027	+0.085	
4	1	Rhian Edmunds (WAL)	X	X		Q
4	2	Lauren Bell (SCO)	+0.008	+0.038		

=== Semifinals ===
Winners proceed to the gold medal final; losers proceed to the bronze medal final.

Heat	Rank	Riders	Race 1	Race 2	Decider (i.r.)	Notes
1	1	Emma Finucane (WAL)	X	X		QG
1	2	Rhian Edmunds (WAL)	+0.512	+1.825		QB
2	1	Sophie Capewell (ENG)	+0.034	X	X	QG
2	2	Nurul Izzah Izzati Mohd Asri (MAS)	X	+0.000	+0.017	QB

=== Finals ===
Rank	Nation	Time	Behind	Notes
Gold medal final
1st place, gold medalist(s)	Emma Finucane (WAL)	X	X	
2nd place, silver medalist(s)	Sophie Capewell (ENG)	+0.050	+0.145	
Bronze medal final
3rd place, bronze medalist(s)	Rhian Edmunds (WAL)	X	X	
4	Nurul Izzah Izzati Mohd Asri (MAS)	+0.112	+0.118	
