= 2023 UCI Track Cycling World Championships – Women's team sprint =

Women's team sprint at the 2023 UCI Track Cycling World Championships
- Venue: Sir Chris Hoy Velodrome
- Location: Glasgow, United Kingdom
- Dates: 3 August
- Competitors: 43 from 14 nations
- Teams: 14
- Winning time: 45.848

Medalists
gold medal	Pauline Grabosch; Emma Hinze; Lea Friedrich	Germany
silver medal	Lauren Bell; Sophie Capewell; Emma Finucane	Great Britain
bronze medal	Guo Yufang; Bao Shanju; Yuan Liying	China

The Women's team sprint competition at the 2023 UCI Track Cycling World Championships was held on 3 August 2023.

== Results ==
=== Qualifying ===
The qualifying was started at 11:03. The eight fastest teams advanced to the first round.

Rank	Nation	Time	Behind	Notes
1	Great Britain; Lauren Bell; Sophie Capewell; Emma Finucane	46.072		Q
2	Germany; Pauline Grabosch; Emma Hinze; Lea Friedrich	46.467	+0.395	Q
3	China; Guo Yufang; Bao Shanju; Yuan Liying	46.679	+0.607	Q
4	Netherlands; Kyra Lamberink; Hetty van de Wouw; Steffie van der Peet	47.049	+.0977	Q
5	New Zealand; Rebecca Petch; Shaane Hazel Fulton; Ellesse Andrews	47.158	+1.086	Q
6	Mexico; Jessica Salazar; Yuli Verdugo; Daniela Gaxiola	47.328	+1.256	Q
7	Canada; Sarah Orban; Kelsey Mitchell; Lauriane Genest	47.348	+1.276	Q
8	Poland; Marlena Karwacka; Urszula Łoś; Nikola Sibiak	47.436	+1.364	Q
9	France; Taky Marie-Divine Kouamé; Julie Michaux; Mathilde Gros	47.628	+1.556	
10	Japan; Aki Sakai; Mina Sato; Fuko Umekawa	48.148	+2.076	
11	United States; Keely Ainslie; Kayla Hankins; Mandy Marquardt	48.617	+2.545	
12	Belgium; Julie Nicolaes; Valerie Jenaer; Nicky Degrendele	48.930	2.858	
13	Malaysia; Nurul Aliana Syafika Azizan; Nurul Izzah Izzati Mohd Asri; Anis Amira Rosidi	50.544	+4.472	
14	Nigeria; Grace Ayuba; Tombrapa Grikpa; Ese Ukpeseraye	56.368	+10.296	

=== First round ===
The first round was started at 19:03.

First round heats were held as follows:
Heat 1: 4th v 5th fastest
Heat 2: 3rd v 6th fastest
Heat 3: 2nd v 7th fastest
Heat 4: 1st v 8th fastest

The heat winners were ranked on time, from which the top two advanced to the gold medal race and the other two proceeded to the bronze medal race.

Heat	Rank	Nation	Time	Notes
1	1	Netherlands; Kyra Lamberink; Shanne Braspennincx; Hetty van de Wouw	46.756	QB
1	2	New Zealand; Ellesse Andrews; Shaane Hazel Fulton; Rebecca Petch	47.067	
2	1	China; Bao Shanju; Guo Yufang; Yuan Liying	46.446	QB
2	2	Mexico; Daniela Gaxiola; Jessica Salazar; Yuli Verdugo	47.374	
3	1	Germany; Lea Friedrich; Pauline Grabosch; Emma Hinze	45.988	QG
3	2	Canada; Lauriane Genest; Kelsey Mitchell; Sarah Orban	47.656	
4	1	Great Britain; Lauren Bell; Sophie Capewell; Emma Finucane	46.078	QG
4	2	Poland; Marlena Karwacka; Urszula Łoś; Nikola Sibiak	47.487	

=== Finals ===
The finals were started at 20:19.

Rank	Nation	Time	Behind	Notes
Gold medal race
1st place, gold medalist(s)	Germany; Lea Friedrich; Pauline Grabosch; Emma Hinze	45.848		WR
2nd place, silver medalist(s)	Great Britain; Lauren Bell; Sophie Capewell; Emma Finucane	45.923	+0.075	
Bronze medal race
3rd place, bronze medalist(s)	China; Bao Shanju; Guo Yufang; Yuan Liying	46.543		
4	Netherlands; Shanne Braspennincx; Kyra Lamberink; Hetty van de Wouw	46.788	+0.245	
