= 2023 UCI Track Cycling World Championships – Women's sprint =

Women's sprint at the 2023 UCI Track Cycling World Championships
- Venue: Sir Chris Hoy Velodrome
- Location: Glasgow, United Kingdom
- Dates: 7–9 August
- Competitors: 36 from 22 nations

Medalists
gold medal	Emma Finucane	Great Britain
silver medal	Lea Friedrich	Germany
bronze medal	Ellesse Andrews	New Zealand

The Women's sprint competition at the 2023 UCI Track Cycling World Championships was held from 7 to 9 August 2023.

== Results ==
=== Qualifying ===
The qualifying was started on 6 August at 11:30. The top four riders advanced directly to the 1/8 finals; places 5 to 28 advanced to the 1/16 final.

Rank	Name	Nation	Time	Behind	Notes
1	Emma Finucane	Great Britain	10.234		Q
2	Sophie Capewell	Great Britain	10.309	+0.075	Q
3	Lea Friedrich	Germany	10.397	+0.163	Q
4	Yuan Liying	China	10.507	+0.273	Q
5	Emma Hinze	Germany	10.533	+0.299	Q
6	Mathilde Gros	France	10.543	+0.309	Q
7	Pauline Grabosch	Germany	10.599	+0.365	Q
8	Lauriane Genest	Canada	10.612	+0.378	Q
9	Guo Yufang	China	10.654	+0.420	Q
10	Ellesse Andrews	New Zealand	10.665	+0.431	Q
11	Kelsey Mitchell	Canada	10.671	+0.437	Q
12	Hetty van de Wouw	Netherlands	10.695	+0.461	Q
13	Kristina Clonan	Australia	10.712	+0.478	Q
14	Martha Bayona	Colombia	10.739	+0.505	Q
15	Taky Marie-Divine Kouamé	France	10.749	+0.515	Q
16	Mina Sato	Japan	10.834	+0.600	Q
17	Riyu Ohta	Japan	10.856	+0.622	Q
18	Sarah Orban	Canada	10.865	+0.631	Q
19	Steffie van der Peet	Netherlands	10.883	+0.649	Q
20	Julie Michaux	France	10.890	+0.656	Q
21	Fuko Umekawa	Japan	10.894	+0.660	Q
22	Miriam Vece	Italy	10.895	+0.661	Q
23	Miglė Lendel	Lithuania	10.898	+0.664	Q
24	Mandy Marquardt	United States	10.925	+0.691	Q
25	Nikola Sibiak	Poland	10.988	+0.754	Q
26	Daniela Gaxiola	Mexico	10.989	+0.755	Q
27	Shaane Fulton	New Zealand	11.004	+0.770	Q
28	Veronika Jaborníková	Czech Republic	11.034	+0.800	Q
29	Alla Biletska	Ukraine	11.045	+0.811	
30	Nicky Degrendele	Belgium	11.082	+0.848	
31	Nurul Mohd	Malaysia	11.183	+0.949	
32	Paulina Petri	Poland	11.258	+1.024	
33	Anis Amira Rosidi	Malaysia	11.410	+1.176	
34	Helena Casas	Spain	11.434	+1.200	
35	Yeung Cho Yiu	Hong Kong	11.562	+1.328	
36	Shahd Mohamed	Egypt	12.272	+2.038	

=== 1/16 finals ===
The 1/16 finals were held on 8 August at 12:38.

Heat	Rank	Name	Nation	Gap	Notes
1	1	Emma Hinze	Germany		Q
1	2	Veronika Jaborníková	Czech Republic	+0.704	
2	1	Mathilde Gros	France		Q
2	2	Shaane Fulton	New Zealand	+0.054	
3	1	Pauline Grabosch	Germany		Q
3	2	Daniela Gaxiola	Mexico	+0.074	
4	1	Lauriane Genest	Canada		Q
4	2	Nikola Sibiak	Poland	+0.512	
5	1	Guo Yufang	China		Q
5	2	Mandy Marquardt	United States	+0.035	
6	1	Ellesse Andrews	New Zealand		Q
6	2	Miglė Lendel	Lithuania	+0.229	
7	1	Kelsey Mitchell	Canada		Q
7	2	Miriam Vece	Italy	+0.189	
8	1	Hetty van de Wouw	Netherlands		Q
8	2	Fuko Umekawa	Japan	+0.129	
9	1	Kristina Clonan	Australia		Q
9	2	Julie Michaux	France	+0.182	
10	1	Martha Bayona	Colombia		Q
10	2	Steffie van der Peet	Netherlands	+0.084	
11	1	Taky Marie-Divine Kouamé	France		Q
11	2	Sarah Orban	Canada	+0.130	
12	1	Mina Sato	Japan		Q
12	2	Riyu Ohta	Japan	+0.092	

=== 1/8 finals ===
The 1/8 finals were held on 8 August at 12:30.

Heat	Rank	Name	Nation	Gap	Notes
1	1	Emma Finucane	Great Britain		Q
1	2	Mina Sato	Japan	+0.178	
2	1	Sophie Capewell	Great Britain		Q
2	2	Taky Marie-Divine Kouamé	France	+0.285	
3	1	Lea Friedrich	Germany		Q
3	2	Martha Bayona	Colombia	+0.058	
4	1	Yuan Liying	China		Q
4	2	Kristina Clonan	Australia	+0.026	
5	1	Emma Hinze	Germany		Q
5	2	Hetty van de Wouw	Netherlands	+0.355	
6	1	Mathilde Gros	France		Q
6	2	Kelsey Mitchell	Canada	+0.007	
7	1	Ellesse Andrews	New Zealand		Q
7	2	Pauline Grabosch	Germany	+0.218	
8	1	Lauriane Genest	Canada		Q
8	2	Guo Yufang	China	+0.017	

=== Quarterfinals ===
The quarterfinals were held on 8 August at 13:58.

Heat	Rank	Name	Nation	Race 1	Race 2	Decider (i.r.)	Notes
1	1	Emma Finucane	Great Britain	X	X		Q
1	2	Lauriane Genest	Canada	+0.174	+0.115		
2	1	Ellesse Andrews	New Zealand	+0.330	X	X	Q
2	2	Sophie Capewell	Great Britain	X	+0.014	+0.536	
3	1	Lea Friedrich	Germany	X	X		Q
3	2	Mathilde Gros	France	+0.237	+0.115		
4	1	Emma Hinze	Germany	X	X		Q
4	2	Yuan Liying	China	+0.105	+0.130		

=== Semifinals ===
The semifinals were held on 9 August at 17:30.

Heat	Rank	Name	Nation	Race 1	Race 2	Decider (i.r.)	Notes
1	1	Emma Finucane	Great Britain	X	X		Q
1	2	Emma Hinze	Germany	+0.158	+0.105		
2	1	Lea Friedrich	Germany	X	X		Q
2	2	Ellesse Andrews	New Zealand	+0.298	+0.192		

=== Finals ===
The finals were held on 9 August at 18:33.

Rank	Name	Nation	Race 1	Race 2	Decider (i.r.)
Gold medal race
1st place, gold medalist(s)	Emma Finucane	Great Britain	X	X	
2nd place, silver medalist(s)	Lea Friedrich	Germany	+0.018	+0.031	
Bronze medal race
3rd place, bronze medalist(s)	Ellesse Andrews	New Zealand	X	X	
4	Emma Hinze	Germany	+0.099	+0.306	
