= 2024 UCI Track Cycling World Championships – Women's sprint =

Women's sprint at the 2024 UCI Track Cycling World Championships
- Venue: Ballerup Super Arena
- Location: Ballerup, Denmark
- Dates: 17–18 October
- Competitors: 31 from 17 nations

Medalists
gold medal	Emma Finucane	Great Britain
silver medal	Hetty van de Wouw	Netherlands
bronze medal	Mina Sato	Japan

The Women's sprint competition at the 2024 UCI Track Cycling World Championships was held on 17 and 18 October 2024.

== Results ==
=== Qualifying ===
The qualifying was started on 17 October at 14:23. The top four riders advanced directly to the 1/8 finals; places 5 to 28 advanced to the 1/16 final.

Rank	Name	Nation	Time	Behind	Notes
1	Emma Finucane	Great Britain	10.377		Q
2	Sophie Capewell	Great Britain	10.382	+0.005	Q
3	Katy Marchant	Great Britain	10.431	+0.054	Q
4	Mathilde Gros	France	10.464	+0.087	Q
5	Mina Sato	Japan	10.552	+0.175	Q
6	Hetty van de Wouw	Netherlands	10.619	+0.242	Q
7	Martha Bayona	Colombia	10.660	+0.283	Q
8	Tong Mengqi	China	10.728	+0.351	Q
9	Yuan Liying	China	10.773	+0.396	Q
10	Fuko Umekawa	Japan	10.790	+0.413	Q
11	Miriam Vece	Italy	10.872	+0.495	Q
12	Clara Schneider	Germany	10.895	+0.518	Q
13	Alla Biletska	Ukraine	10.895	+0.518	Q
14	Alessa-Catriona Pröpster	Germany	10.917	+0.540	Q
15	Steffie van der Peet	Netherlands	10.948	+0.571	Q
16	Sarah Orban	Canada	10.971	+0.594	Q
17	Wang Lijuan	China	10.977	+0.600	Q
18	Nikola Seremak	Poland	11.010	+0.633	Q
19	Nurul Izzah Izzati Mohd Asri	Malaysia	11.055	+0.678	Q
20	Paulina Petri	Poland	11.071	+0.694	Q
21	Daniela Gaxiola	Mexico	11.077	+0.700	Q
22	Yuli Verdugo	Mexico	11.081	+0.704	Q
23	Alessia McCaig	Australia	11.083	+0.706	Q
24	Veronika Jaborníková	Czech Republic	11.084	+0.707	Q
25	Molly McGill	Australia	11.127	+0.750	Q
26	Oleksandra Lohviniuk	Ukraine	11.140	+0.763	Q
27	Jessica Salazar	Mexico	11.291	+0.914	Q
28	Anis Amira Rosidi	Malaysia	11.305	+0.928	Q
29	Ng Sze Wing	Hong Kong	11.347	+0.970	
30	Yeung Cho Yiu	Hong Kong	11.420	+1.043	
31	Miglė Lendel	Lithuania	11.540	+1.163	

=== 1/16 finals ===
The 1/16 finals were started on 17 October at 15:30.

Heat	Rank	Name	Nation	Gap	Notes
1	1	Mina Sato	Japan		Q
1	2	Anis Amira Rosidi	Malaysia	+0.242	
2	1	Hetty van de Wouw	Netherlands		Q
2	2	Jessica Salazar	Mexico	+0.326	
3	1	Martha Bayona	Colombia		Q
3	2	Oleksandra Lohviniuk	Ukraine	+0.340	
4	1	Tong Mengqi	China		Q
4	2	Molly McGill	Australia	+0.111	
5	1	Yuan Liying	China		Q
5	2	Veronika Jaborníková	Czech Republic	+0.047	
6	1	Alessia McCaig	Australia		Q
6	2	Fuko Umekawa	Japan	+0.022	
7	1	Miriam Vece	Italy		Q
7	2	Yuli Verdugo	Mexico	+0.038	
8	1	Clara Schneider	Germany		Q
8	2	Daniela Gaxiola	Mexico	+0.050	
9	1	Paulina Petri	Poland		Q
9	2	Alla Biletska	Ukraine	+0.174	
10	1	Alessa-Catriona Pröpster	Germany		Q
10	2	Nurul Izzah Izzati Mohd Asri	Malaysia	REL	
11	1	Steffie van der Peet	Netherlands		Q
11	2	Nikola Seremak	Poland	+0.167	
12	1	Wang Lijuan	China		Q
12	2	Sarah Orban	Canada	+0.094	

=== 1/8 finals ===
The 1/8 finals were started on 17 October at 16:22.

Heat	Rank	Name	Nation	Gap	Notes
1	1	Emma Finucane	Great Britain		Q
1	2	Wang Lijuan	China	+0.559	
2	1	Sophie Capewell	Great Britain		Q
2	2	Steffie van der Peet	Netherlands	+0.152	
3	1	Katy Marchant	Great Britain		Q
3	2	Alessa-Catriona Pröpster	Germany	+0.169	
4	1	Mathilde Gros	France		Q
4	2	Paulina Petri	Poland	+0.071	
5	1	Mina Sato	Japan		Q
5	2	Clara Schneider	Germany	+0.243	
6	1	Hetty van de Wouw	Netherlands		Q
6	2	Miriam Vece	Italy	+0.064	
7	1	Martha Bayona	Colombia		Q
7	2	Alessia McCaig	Australia	+0.052	
8	1	Yuan Liying	China		Q
8	2	Tong Mengqi	China	+0.230	

=== Quarterfinals ===
The quarterfinals were started on 17 October at 19:00.

Heat	Rank	Name	Nation	Race 1	Race 2	Decider (i.r.)	Notes
1	1	Emma Finucane	Great Britain	X	X		Q
1	2	Yuan Liying	China	+0.243	+0.509		
2	1	Sophie Capewell	Great Britain	X	X		Q
2	2	Martha Bayona	Colombia	+0.942	+0.065		
3	1	Hetty van de Wouw	Netherlands	+0.026	X	X	Q
3	2	Katy Marchant	Great Britain	X	+0.086	+0.003	
4	1	Mina Sato	Japan	X	X		Q
4	2	Mathilde Gros	France	+0.122	+0.080		

=== Semifinals ===
The semifinals were started on 18 October at 19:24.

Heat	Rank	Name	Nation	Race 1	Race 2	Decider (i.r.)	Notes
1	1	Emma Finucane	Great Britain	X	X		Q
1	2	Mina Sato	Japan	+0.119	+0.127		
2	1	Hetty van de Wouw	Netherlands	+0.059	X	X	Q
2	2	Sophie Capewell	Great Britain	X	+0.032	+0.504	

=== Finals ===
The finals were started on 18 October at 20:53.

Rank	Name	Nation	Race 1	Race 2	Decider (i.r.)
Gold medal race
1st place, gold medalist(s)	Emma Finucane	Great Britain	X	X	
2nd place, silver medalist(s)	Hetty van de Wouw	Netherlands	+0.995	+0.135	
Bronze medal race
3rd place, bronze medalist(s)	Mina Sato	Japan	X	X	
4	Sophie Capewell	Great Britain	+0.176	+0.338	
