= Cycling at the 2022 Commonwealth Games – Women's sprint =

Cycling Track – Women's sprint at the 2022 Commonwealth Games
- Venue: Lee Valley VeloPark
- Dates: 30 July
- Competitors: 26 from 10 nations

Medalists
gold medal	Ellesse Andrews	New Zealand
silver medal	Kelsey Mitchell	Canada
bronze medal	Emma Finucane	Wales

The women's sprint at the 2022 Commonwealth Games was part of the cycling programme, which took place on 30 July 2022.

== Records ==
Prior to this competition, the existing world and Games records were as follows:

World record	Kelsey Mitchell (CAN)	10.154	Cochabamba, Bolivia	4 September 2019
Games record	Stephanie Morton (AUS)	10.524	Brisbane, Australia	6 April 2018

== Schedule ==
The schedule is as follows:

All times are British Summer Time (UTC+1)

Date	Time	Round
Saturday 30 July 2022	10:02	Qualifying
Saturday 30 July 2022	11:33	1/8 finals
Saturday 30 July 2022	12:06	Quarterfinals
Saturday 30 July 2022	16:22	Semifinals
Saturday 30 July 2022	17:51	Finals

== Results ==
=== Qualifying ===
Top 16 riders qualified for the 1/8 finals.

Rank	Riders	Time	Behind	Notes
1	Kelsey Mitchell (CAN)	10.612	—	Q
2	Sophie Capewell (ENG)	10.625	+0.013	Q
3	Lauriane Genest (CAN)	10.674	+0.062	Q
4	Emma Finucane (WAL)	10.804	+0.192	Q
5	Kristina Clonan (AUS)	10.825	+0.213	Q
6	Ellesse Andrews (NZL)	10.869	+0.257	Q
7	Sarah Orban (CAN)	10.887	+0.275	Q
8	Lowri Thomas (WAL)	10.888	+0.276	Q
9	Rhian Edmunds (WAL)	10.933	+0.321	Q
10	Lauren Bell (SCO)	10.956	+0.344	Q
11	Breanna Hargrave (AUS)	10.958	+0.346	Q
12	Blaine Ridge-Davis (ENG)	11.125	+0.513	Q
13	Lusia Steele (SCO)	11.171	+0.559	Q
14	Olivia King (NZL)	11.175	+0.563	Q
15	Iona Moir (SCO)	11.193	+0.581	Q
16	Rebecca Petch (NZL)	11.209	+0.597	Q
17	Alessia McCaig (AUS)	11.301	+0.689	
18	Anis Rosidi (MAS)	11.302	+0.690	
19	Millie Tanner (ENG)	11.310	+0.698	
20	Mayuri Lute (IND)	11.542	+0.930	
21	Dahlia Palmer (JAM)	11.678	+1.066	
22	Izzah Asri (MAS)	11.681	+1.069	
23	Triyasha Paul (IND)	11.813	+1.201	
24	Aliana Rahim (MAS)	11.990	+1.378	
25	Erica Sedzro (GHA)	18.857	+8.245	
26	Florence Heridor (GHA)	19.160	+8.548	
	Amber Joseph (BAR)	Did not start		

=== 1/8 finals ===
Heat winners advanced to the quarterfinals.

Heat	Rank	Riders	Gap	Notes
1	1	Kelsey Mitchell (CAN)	—	Q
1	2	Rebecca Petch (NZL)	+0.357	
2	1	Sophie Capewell (ENG)	—	Q
2	2	Iona Moir (SCO)	+0.257	
3	1	Lauriane Genest (CAN)	—	Q
3	2	Olivia King (NZL)	+0.109	
4	1	Emma Finucane (WAL)	—	Q
4	2	Lusia Steele (SCO)	+0.123	
5	1	Kristina Clonan (AUS)	—	Q
5	2	Blaine Ridge-Davis (ENG)	+0.330	
6	1	Ellesse Andrews (NZL)	—	Q
6	2	Breanna Hargrave (AUS)	+0.363	
7	1	Sarah Orban (CAN)	—	Q
7	2	Lauren Bell (SCO)	+0.070	
8	1	Rhian Edmunds (WAL)	—	Q
8	2	Lowri Thomas (WAL)	DNF	

=== Quarterfinals ===
Matches are extended to a best-of-three format hereon; winners proceed to the semifinals.

Heat	Rank	Riders	Race 1	Race 2	Decider (i.r.)	Notes
1	1	Kelsey Mitchell (CAN)	X	X		Q
1	2	Rhian Edmunds (WAL)	+0.174	+0.397		
2	1	Sophie Capewell (ENG)	X	X		Q
2	2	Sarah Orban (CAN)	+0.011	DNF		
3	1	Ellesse Andrews (NZL)	+0.143	X	X	Q
3	2	Lauriane Genest (CAN)	X	+0.080	+0.764	
4	1	Emma Finucane (WAL)	X	+0.019	X	Q
4	2	Kristina Clonan (AUS)	REL	X	+0.006	

=== Semifinals ===
Winners proceed to the gold medal final; losers proceed to the bronze medal final.

Heat	Rank	Riders	Race 1	Race 2	Decider (i.r.)	Notes
1	1	Kelsey Mitchell (CAN)	X	X		QG
1	2	Emma Finucane (WAL)	+0.470	+0.122		QB
2	1	Ellesse Andrews (NZL)	X	X		QG
2	2	Sophie Capewell (ENG)	+0.095	+0.022		QB

=== Finals ===
The final classification is determined in the medal finals.

Rank	Riders	Race 1	Race 2	Decider (i.r.)
Gold medal final
1st place, gold medalist(s)	Ellesse Andrews (NZL)	X	X	
2nd place, silver medalist(s)	Kelsey Mitchell (CAN)	+0.003	+0.091	
Bronze medal final
3rd place, bronze medalist(s)	Emma Finucane (WAL)	+0.082	X	X
4	Sophie Capewell (ENG)	X	+0.052	+0.080
