= 2022 UCI Track Cycling World Championships – Women's team sprint =

Women's team sprint at the 2022 UCI Track Cycling World Championships
- Venue: Vélodrome National
- Location: Saint-Quentin-en-Yvelines, France
- Dates: 12 October
- Competitors: 34 from 11 nations
- Teams: 11
- Winning time: 45.976

Medalists
gold medal	Pauline Grabosch; Emma Hinze; Lea Friedrich	Germany
silver medal	Bao Shanju; Guo Yufang; Yuan Liying	China
bronze medal	Lauren Bell; Sophie Capewell; Emma Finucane	Great Britain

The Women's team sprint competition at the 2022 UCI Track Cycling World Championships was held on 12 October 2022.

== Results ==
=== Qualifying ===
The qualifying was started at 18:30. The best eight teams advanced to the first round.

Rank	Nation	Time	Behind	Notes
1	Germany; Pauline Grabosch; Emma Hinze; Lea Friedrich	46.573		Q
2	Netherlands; Kyra Lamberink; Shanne Braspennincx; Steffie van der Peet	46.643	+0.070	Q
3	Great Britain; Lauren Bell; Sophie Capewell; Emma Finucane	46.986	+0.413	Q
4	China; Guo Yufang; Bao Shanju; Yuan Liying	47.175	+0.602	Q
5	France; Taky Marie-Divine Kouamé; Julie Michaux; Mathilde Gros	47.624	+1.051	Q
6	Poland; Marlena Karwacka; Urszula Łoś; Nikola Sibiak	47.746	+1.173	Q
7	Japan; Fuko Umekawa; Riyu Ohta; Mina Sato	48.709	+2.136	Q
8	Canada; Sarah Orban; Kelsey Mitchell; Jackie Boyle	48.730	+2.157	Q
9	United States; Keely Kortman; Kayla Hankins; McKenna McKee	49.873	+3.330	
10	Malaysia; Nurul Aliana Syafika Azizan; Nurul Izzah Izzati Mohd Asri; Anis Amira Rosidi	51.064	+4.491	
11	Nigeria; Tawakalt Yekeen; Mary Samuel; Tombrapa Grikpa	56.921	+10.348	

=== First round ===
The first round was started at 20:18.

First round heats were held as follows:
Heat 1: 4th v 5th fastest
Heat 2: 3rd v 6th fastest
Heat 3: 2nd v 7th fastest
Heat 4: 1st v 8th fastest

The heat winners were ranked on time, from which the top two advanced to the gold medal race and the other two proceeded to the bronze medal race.

Heat	Rank	Nation	Time	Behind	Notes
1	1	China; Bao Shanju; Guo Yufang; Yuan Liying	46.458		QG
1	2	France; Mathilde Gros; Taky Marie-Divine Kouamé; Julie Michaux	47.118	+0.660	
2	1	Great Britain; Lauren Bell; Sophie Capewell; Emma Finucane	46.699		QB
2	2	Poland; Marlena Karwacka; Urszula Łoś; Nikola Sibiak	47.347	+0.648	
3	1	Netherlands; Shanne Braspennincx; Kyra Lamberink; Steffie van der Peet	46.529		QB
3	2	Japan; Riyu Ohta; Mina Sato; Fuko Umekawa	48.074	+1.545	
4	1	Germany; Lea Friedrich; Pauline Grabosch; Emma Hinze	45.983		QG, WR
4	2	Canada; Jackie Boyle; Lauriane Genest; Sarah Orban	48.173	+2.190	

=== Finals ===
The first round were held at 21:18.

Rank	Nation	Time	Behind	Notes
Gold medal race
1st place, gold medalist(s)	Germany; Pauline Grabosch; Emma Hinze; Lea Friedrich	45.967		WR
2nd place, silver medalist(s)	China; Bao Shanju; Guo Yufang; Yuan Liying	46.631	+0.664	
Bronze medal race
3rd place, bronze medalist(s)	Great Britain; Lauren Bell; Sophie Capewell; Emma Finucane	46.596		
4	Netherlands; Kyra Lamberink; Shanne Braspennincx; Steffie van der Peet	46.604	+0.008	
