= 2025 UCI Track Cycling World Championships – Women's keirin =

Women's keirin at the 2025 UCI Track Cycling World Championships
- Venue: Velódromo Peñalolén
- Location: Santiago, Chile
- Dates: 26 October
- Competitors: 33 from 21 nations

Medalists
gold medal	Mina Sato	Japan
silver medal	Emma Finucane	Great Britain
bronze medal	Stefany Cuadrado	Colombia

The Women's keirin competition at the 2025 UCI Track Cycling World Championships was held on 26 October 2025.

== Results ==
=== First round ===
The first round was started at 11:08. The first two riders from each heat qualified for the quarterfinals, all other riders moved to the repechages.

Heat 1

Rank	Name	Nation	Gap	Notes
1	Stefany Cuadrado	Colombia		Q
2	Mina Sato	Japan	+0.164	Q
3	Kayla Hankins	United States	+0.224	
4	Yuli Verdugo	Mexico	+0.375	
5	Alla Biletska	Ukraine	+0.446	

Heat 3

Rank	Name	Nation	Gap	Notes
1	Hetty van de Wouw	Netherlands		Q
2	Ellesse Andrews	New Zealand	+0.661	Q
3	Alessa-Catriona Pröpster	Germany	+0.846	
4	Helena Casas	Spain	+0.865	
5	Shahd Mohamed	Egypt		

Heat 5

Rank	Name	Nation	Gap	Notes
1	Emma Finucane	Great Britain		Q
2	Haruka Nakazawa	Japan	+0.063	Q
3	Nurul Izzah Izzati Mohd Asri	Malaysia	+0.524	
4	McKenna McKee	United States	+1.106	
5	Paula Molina	Chile	+1.441	
6	Sarah Orban	Canada	+1.441	

Heat 2

Rank	Name	Nation	Gap	Notes
1	Lea Friedrich	Germany		Q
2	Alessia McCaig	Australia	+0.030	Q
3	Alina Lysenko	Individual Neutral Athletes	+0.057	
4	Makaira Wallace	Trinidad and Tobago	+0.131	
5	Nikola Sibiak	Poland	+0.200	

Heat 4

Rank	Name	Nation	Gap	Notes
1	Miriam Vece	Italy		Q
2	Iana Burlakova	Individual Neutral Athletes	+0.053	Q
3	Veronika Jaborníková	Czech Republic	+0.386	
4	Kimberly Kalee	Netherlands	+0.923	
5	Juliana Gaviria	Colombia	+1.076	
6	Marlena Karwacka	Poland	+2.251	

Heat 6

Rank	Name	Nation	Gap	Notes
1	Lauriane Genest	Canada		Q
2	Mathilde Gros	France	+0.419	Q
3	Lauren Bell	Great Britain	+0.419	
4	Steffie van der Peet	Netherlands	+0.549	
5	Liliya Tatarinoff	Australia	+0.811	
6	Aki Sakai	Japan	+1.032	

=== First round repechage ===
The first round repechage was started at 11:53. The first two riders from each heat qualified for the quarterfinals.

Heat 1

Rank	Name	Nation	Gap	Notes
1	Steffie van der Peet	Netherlands		Q
2	Nikola Sibiak	Poland	+0.064	Q
3	Veronika Jaborníková	Czech Republic	+0.182	
4	Sarah Orban	Canada	+0.356	
5	Helena Casas	Spain	+0.521	
6	Kayla Hankins	United States	+0.840	
7	Paula Molina	Chile	+0.968	

Heat 3

Rank	Name	Nation	Gap	Notes
1	Alla Biletska	Ukraine		Q
2	Lauren Bell	Great Britain	+0.013	Q
3	McKenna McKee	United States	+0.032	
4	Alessa-Catriona Pröpster	Germany	+0.146	
5	Makaira Wallace	Trinidad and Tobago	+0.159	
6	Juliana Gaviria	Colombia	+0.368	
7	Aki Sakai	Japan	+1.519	

Heat 2

Rank	Name	Nation	Gap	Notes
1	Alina Lysenko	Individual Neutral Athletes		Q
2	Liliya Tatarinoff	Australia	+0.072	Q
3	Nurul Izzah Izzati Mohd Asri	Malaysia	+0.101	
4	Kimberly Kalee	Netherlands	+0.248	
5	Yuli Verdugo	Mexico	+0.312	
6	Shahd Mohamed	Egypt	+1.196	
7	Marlena Karwacka	Poland	+2.587	

=== Quarterfinals ===
The quarterfinals were started at 13:38. The first four riders from each heat qualified for the semifinals.

Heat 1

Rank	Name	Nation	Gap	Notes
1	Stefany Cuadrado	Colombia		Q
2	Miriam Vece	Italy	+0.022	Q
3	Ellesse Andrews	New Zealand	+0.201	Q
4	Steffie van der Peet	Netherlands	+0.259	Q
5	Mathilde Gros	France	+0.465	
6	Nikola Sibiak	Poland	+2.086	

Heat 3

Rank	Name	Nation	Gap	Notes
1	Lauren Bell	Great Britain		Q
2	Alessia McCaig	Australia	+0.017	Q
3	Lauriane Genest	Canada	+0.028	Q
4	Hetty van de Wouw	Netherlands	+0.088	Q
5	Alina Lysenko	Individual Neutral Athletes	+0.129	
6	Haruka Nakazawa	Japan		REL

Heat 2

Rank	Name	Nation	Gap	Notes
1	Emma Finucane	Great Britain		Q
2	Iana Burlakova	Individual Neutral Athletes	+0.014	Q
3	Mina Sato	Japan	+0.097	Q
4	Lea Friedrich	Germany	+0.272	Q
5	Alla Biletska	Ukraine	+0.358	
6	Liliya Tatarinoff	Australia	+0.485	

=== Semifinals ===
The semifinals were started at 14:31. The first three riders in each heat qualified for the final, all other riders race for places 7 to 12.

Heat 1

Rank	Name	Nation	Gap	Notes
1	Emma Finucane	Great Britain		Q
2	Miriam Vece	Italy	+0.044	Q
3	Mina Sato	Japan	+0.274	Q
4	Hetty van de Wouw	Netherlands	+0.290	
5	Iana Burlakova	Individual Neutral Athletes	+0.399	
6	Lauriane Genest	Canada	+0.853	

Heat 2

Rank	Name	Nation	Gap	Notes
1	Stefany Cuadrado	Colombia		Q
2	Lea Friedrich	Germany	+0.080	Q
3	Alessia McCaig	Australia	+0.192	Q
4	Lauren Bell	Great Britain	+0.262	
5	Steffie van der Peet	Netherlands	+0.357	
6	Ellesse Andrews	New Zealand	+0.421	

=== Finals ===
The finals were started at 15:32.

==== Small final ====
Rank	Name	Nation	Gap	Notes
7	Hetty van de Wouw	Netherlands		
8	Lauriane Genest	Canada	+0.701	
9	Lauren Bell	Great Britain	+0.765	
10	Steffie van der Peet	Netherlands	+0.779	
11	Ellesse Andrews	New Zealand	+1.436	
12	Iana Burlakova	Individual Neutral Athletes	+1.696	

==== Final ====
Rank	Name	Nation	Gap	Notes
1st place, gold medalist(s)	Mina Sato	Japan		
2nd place, silver medalist(s)	Emma Finucane	Great Britain	+0.049	
3rd place, bronze medalist(s)	Stefany Cuadrado	Colombia	+0.341	
4	Alessia McCaig	Australia	+0.421	
5	Miriam Vece	Italy	+0.554	
6	Lea Friedrich	Germany	+0.847	
