= Track cycling at the 2026 Commonwealth Games – Women's keirin =

Cycling Track – Women's keirin at the 2026 Commonwealth Games
- Venue: Sir Chris Hoy Velodrome
- Dates: 2 August 2026
- Competitors: 18

Medalists
gold medal	Emma Finucane	Wales
silver medal	Ellesse Andrews	New Zealand
bronze medal	Kristina Clonan	Australia

The women's keirin at the 2026 Commonwealth Games was part of the cycling programme, which took place on 2 August 2026. The event was won by Welsh sprinter Emma Finucane, one of a record four sprint gold medals she won in Glasgow.

== Schedule ==
The schedule was as follows:

All times are British Summer Time (UTC+1)

Date	Time	Round
Sunday 2 August 2026	14:02	First round
Sunday 2 August 2026	14:42	First round repechages
Sunday 2 August 2026	16:08	Second round
Sunday 2 August 2026	16:43	Finals

== Results ==
=== First round ===
The top two in each heat advanced directly to the second round; the remainder were sent to the first round repechages.

==== Heat 1 ====
Rank	Rider	Country	Gap	Notes
1	Emma Finucane	Wales	—	Q
2	Iona Moir	Scotland	+0.075	Q
3	Liliya Tatarinoff	Australia	+0.944	R
4	Georgette Rand	England	+0.996	R
5	Nur Alyssa Mohd Farid	Malaysia	+1.291	R
6	Dahlia Palmer	Jamaica	+4.880	R
Final 200 m time : 10.71			Average Speed :67.227	

==== Heat 2 ====
Rank	Rider	Country	Gap	Notes
1	Alessia McCaig	Australia	—	Q
2	Nurul Izzah Mohd Asri	Malaysia	+0.005	Q
3	Lowri Thomas	Wales	+0.115	R
4	Katy Marchant	England	+0.166	R
5	Olivia King	New Zealand	+0.338	R
6	Ellie Stone	Scotland	+0.355	R
Final 200 m time : 11.361			Average Speed :63.375	

==== Heat 3 ====
Rank	Rider	Country	Gap	Notes
1	Ellesse Andrews	New Zealand	—	Q
2	Kristina Clonan	Australia	+0.029	Q
3	Sophie Capewell	England	+0.180	R
4	Sarah Orban	Canada	+1.842	R
-	Lauren Bell	Scotland	DNF	R
-	Rhian Edmunds	Wales	DNF	R
Final 200 m time : 11.278			Average Speed :63.841	

=== First round repechages ===
The first three in each repechage advanced to the second round.

==== Heat 1 ====
Rank	Rider	Country	Gap	Notes
1	Katy Marchant	England	—	Q
2	Liliya Tatarinoff	Australia	+0.074	Q
3	Olivia King	New Zealand	+0.419	Q
4	Sarah Orban	Canada	+0.498	
5	Dahlia Palmer	Jamaica	+1.682	
6	Lauren Bell	Scotland	DNS	
Final 200 m time : 11.133			Average Speed :64.673	

==== Heat 2 ====
Rank	Rider	Country	Gap	Notes
1	Sophie Capewell	England	—	Q
2	Georgette Rand	England	+0.177	Q
3	Lowri Thomas	Wales	+0.29	Q
4	Nur Alyssa Mohd Farid	Malaysia	+0.421	
5	Ellie Stone	Scotland	+0.429	
6	Rhian Edmunds	Wales	DNS	
Final 200 m time : 11.074			Average Speed :65.017	

=== Second round ===
The top three in each heat advanced to the final; the remainder were sent to the small final (for places 7–12).

==== Heat 1 ====
Rank	Rider	Country	Gap	Notes
1	Emma Finucane	Wales	—	Q
2	Katy Marchant	England	+0.155	Q
3	Kristina Clonan	Australia	+0.162	Q
4	Nurul Izzah Mohd Asri	Malaysia	+0.279	QB
5	Olivia King	New Zealand	+0.36	QB
6	Georgette Rand	England	+0.370	QB
200 m time : 11.19			Average Speed :64.539	

==== Heat 2 ====
Rank	Rider	Country	Gap	Notes
1	Ellesse Andrews	New Zealand	—	Q
2	Lowri Thomas	Wales	+0.038	Q
3	Alessia Mccaig	Australia	+0.179	Q
4	Sophie Capewell	England	+0.211	QB
5	Iona Moir	Scotland	+0.217	QB
6	Liliya Tatarinoff	Australia	+0.353	QB
final 200 m time : 11.156			Average Speed :64.343	

=== Finals ===
The final classification was determined in the medal finals.

==== Final (places 7–12) ====
Rank	Rider	Country	Gap	Notes
7	Olivia King	New Zealand	—	
8	Liliya Tatarinoff	Australia	0.049	
9	Georgette Rand	England	0.166	
10	Nurul Izzah Mohd Asri	Malaysia	0.290	
11	Sophie Capewell	England	0.322	
12	Iona Moir	Scotland	1.453	

==== Final (places 1–6) ====
Rank	Rider	Country	Gap	Notes
1st place, gold medalist(s)	Emma Finucane	Wales	—	
2nd place, silver medalist(s)	Ellesse Andrews	New Zealand	0.097	
3rd place, bronze medalist(s)	Kristina Clonan	Australia	0.152	
4	Alessia McCaig	Australia	0.225	
5	Katy Marchant	England	0.255	
6	Lowri Thomas	Wales	0.257	
