= List of World Championships records in track cycling =

World Championships records in the sport of track cycling are ratified by the Union Cycliste Internationale (UCI).

== Men ==
Updated after the 2026 UCI Track Cycling World Championships

Event	Record	Athlete	Nationality	Date	Meet	Place	Ref
Flying 200 m time trial	9.210	Matthew Richardson	Great Britain	25 October 2025	2025 World Championships	Santiago, Chile	
1 km time trial	57.321	Harrie Lavreysen	Netherlands	18 October 2024	2024 World Championships	Ballerup, Denmark	
Team sprint	41.225	Jeffrey Hoogland; Harrie Lavreysen; Roy van den Berg	Netherlands	26 February 2020	2020 World Championships	Berlin, Germany	
4000m individual pursuit	3:58.850	Jonathan Milan	Italy	16 October 2026	2026 World Championships	Shanghai, China	
4000m team pursuit	3:40.865	Carl-Frederik Bévort; Lasse Norman Leth; Frederik Madsen; Rasmus Pedersen	Denmark	15 October 2026	2026 World Championships	Shanghai, China	

== Women ==
Updated after the 2026 UCI Track Cycling World Championships

Event	Record	Athlete	Nationality	Date	Meet	Place	Ref
Flying 200 m time trial	10.148	Yuan Liying	China	15 August 2026	2026 World Championships	Shanghai, China	
500 m time trial	32.820	Emma Hinze	Germany	4 August 2023	2023 World Championships	Glasgow, United Kingdom	
1 km time trial	1:03.121	Hetty van de Wouw	Netherlands	25 October 2025	2025 World Championships	Santiago, Chile	
Team sprint (500 m)	32.034	Gong Jinjie; Zhong Tianshi	China	18 February 2015	2015 World Championships	Saint-Quentin-en-Yvelines, France	
Team sprint (750 m)	45.578	Jiang Yulu; Tong Mengqi; Yuan Liying	China	14 October 2026	2026 World Championships	Shanghai, China	
3000m individual pursuit	3:15.663	Chloé Dygert	United States	19 October 2024	2024 World Championships	Ballerup, Denmark	
4000m individual pursuit	4:21.161	Millie Couzens	Great Britain	17 October 2026	2026 World Championships	Shanghai, China	
3000m team pursuit^{[F]}	3:15.720	Danielle King; Laura Trott; Joanna Rowsell	Great Britain	5 April 2012	2012 World Championships	Melbourne, Australia	
4000m team pursuit	4:04.610	Erin Boothman; Anna Morris; Millie Couzens; Josie Knight	Great Britain	15 October 2026	2026 World Championships	Shanghai, China	

== Notes ==
- ^{^{F}} After the 2013 World Championships, the 3000m / 3 rider format was replaced by a 4000m / 4 rider format.
