= 2025 UCI Track Cycling World Championships – Women's team sprint =

Women's team sprint at the 2025 UCI Track Cycling World Championships
- Venue: Peñalolén Velodrome
- Location: Santiago, Chile
- Dates: 22 October
- Competitors: 35 from 11 nations
- Teams: 11
- Winning points: 45.743

Medalists
gold medal	Kimberly Kalee; Hetty van de Wouw; Steffie van der Peet	Netherlands
silver medal	Emma Finucane; Iona Moir; Rhianna Parris-Smith	Great Britain
bronze medal	Alessia McCaig; Molly McGill; Kristine Perkins; Liliya Tatarinoff	Australia

The Women's team sprint competition at the 2025 UCI Track Cycling World Championships was held on 22 October 2025.

== Results ==
=== Qualifying ===
The qualifying was started at 14:15. The eight fastest teams advanced to the first round.

Rank	Nation	Time	Behind	Notes
1	Great Britain; Rhianna Parris-Smith; Iona Moir; Emma Finucane	45.808		Q
2	Netherlands; Kimberly Kalee; Hetty van de Wouw; Steffie van der Peet	45.947	+0.139	Q
3	Australia; Liliya Tatarinoff; Molly McGill; Alessia McCaig	46.988	+1.180	Q
4	United States; Emily Hayes; Kayla Hankins; Hayley Yoslov	47.631	+1.823	Q
5	Poland; Marlena Karwacka; Urszula Łoś; Nikola Sibiak	47.664	+1.856	Q
6	Germany; Pauline Grabosch; Lea Friedrich; Alessa-Catriona Pröpster	47.734	+1.926	Q
7	Mexico; Jessica Salazar; Yuli Verdugo; Daniela Gaxiola	47.884	+2.076	Q
8	Colombia; Juliana Gaviria; Marianis Salazar; Stefany Cuadrado	48.123	+2.315	Q
9	Czech Republic; Sára Peterková; Veronika Jaborníková; Anna Jaborníková	48.742	+2.934	
10	Japan; Aki Sakai; Mina Sato; Haruka Nakazawa	48.950	+3.142	
11	Chile; Paula Molina; Daniela Colilef; Paola Muñoz	50.186	+4.378	

=== First round ===
The first round was started at 18:30.

First round heats were held as follows:
Heat 1: 4th v 5th fastest
Heat 2: 3rd v 6th fastest
Heat 3: 2nd v 7th fastest
Heat 4: 1st v 8th fastest

The heat winners were ranked on time, from which the top two advanced to the gold medal race and the other two proceeded to the bronze medal race.

Rank	Heat	Nation	Time	Notes
1	1	Poland; Marlena Karwacka; Nikola Seremak; Nikola Sibiak	47.430	QB
2	1	United States; Kayla Hankins; Emily Hayes; Hayley Yoslov	47.631	
1	2	Australia; Alessia McCaig; Molly McGill; Kristine Perkins	46.453	QB
2	2	Germany; Lea Friedrich; Pauline Grabosch; Alessa-Catriona Pröpster	47.177	
1	3	Netherlands; Kimberly Kalee; Hetty van de Wouw; Steffie van der Peet	45.709	QG
2	3	Mexico; Daniela Gaxiola; Jessica Salazar; Yuli Verdugo	47.445	
1	4	Great Britain; Emma Finucane; Iona Moir; Rhianna Parris-Smith	45.864	QG
2	4	Colombia; Stefany Cuadrado; Juliana Gaviria; Marianis Salazar	47.943	

=== Finals ===
The final was started at 19:56.

Rank	Nation	Time	Behind	Notes
Gold medal race
1st place, gold medalist(s)	Netherlands; Kimberly Kalee; Hetty van de Wouw; Steffie van der Peet	45.743		
2nd place, silver medalist(s)	Great Britain; Emma Finucane; Iona Moir; Rhianna Parris-Smith	46.003	+0.260	
Bronze medal race
3rd place, bronze medalist(s)	Australia; Alessia McCaig; Molly McGill; Kristine Perkins	46.773		
4	Poland; Marlena Karwacka; Urszula Łoś; Nikola Seremak	48.033	+1.260	
