= 2024 UCI Track Cycling World Championships – Women's team sprint =

Women's team sprint at the 2024 UCI Track Cycling World Championships
- Venue: Ballerup Super Arena
- Location: Ballerup, Denmark
- Dates: 16 October
- Competitors: 28 from 8 nations
- Teams: 8
- Winning time: 45.949

Medalists
gold medal	Katy Marchant; Sophie Capewell; Emma Finucane	Great Britain
silver medal	Kimberly Kalee; Hetty van de Wouw; Steffie van der Peet; Kyra Lamberink	Netherlands
bronze medal	Molly McGill; Kristina Clonan; Alessia McCaig	Australia

The Women's team sprint competition at the 2024 UCI Track Cycling World Championships was held on 16 October 2024.

== Results ==
=== Qualifying ===
The qualifying was started at 13:52. As only eight teams competed, all teams advanced to the first round.

Rank	Nation	Time	Behind	Notes
1	Great Britain; Katy Marchant; Sophie Capewell; Emma Finucane	46.217		Q
2	Netherlands; Kimberly Kalee; Hetty van de Wouw; Steffie van der Peet	46.930	+0.713	Q
3	Australia; Molly McGill; Kristina Clonan; Alessia McCaig	47.727	+1.510	Q
4	China; Guo Yufang; Jiang Yulu; Yuan Liying	47.808	+1.591	Q
5	Germany; Lara-Sophie Jäger; Clara Schneider; Alessa-Catriona Pröpster	48.217	+2.000	Q
6	Mexico; Jessica Salazar; Daniela Gaxiola; Yuli Verdugo	48.572	+2.355	Q
7	Poland; Marlena Karwacka; Urszula Łoś; Nikola Seremak	48.621	+2.404	Q
8	Ukraine; Anna Kolyzhuk; Oleksandra Lohviniuk; Alla Biletska	51.942	+5.725	Q

=== First round ===
The first round was started at 18:32.

First round heats were held as follows:
Heat 1: 4th v 5th fastest
Heat 2: 3rd v 6th fastest
Heat 3: 2nd v 7th fastest
Heat 4: 1st v 8th fastest

The heat winners were ranked on time, from which the top two advanced to the gold medal race and the other two proceeded to the bronze medal race.

Heat	Rank	Nation	Time	Notes
1	1	Germany; Lara-Sophie Jäger; Alessa-Catriona Pröpster; Clara Schneider	48.396	QB
1	–	China; Tong Mengqi; Guo Yufang; Yuan Liying	Did not start	
2	1	Australia; Molly McGill; Kristina Clonan; Alessia McCaig	47.472	QB
2	2	Mexico; Jessica Salazar; Daniela Gaxiola; Yuli Verdugo	48.142	
3	1	Netherlands; Kyra Lamberink; Hetty van de Wouw; Steffie van der Peet	46.803	QG
3	2	Poland; Marlena Karwacka; Urszula Łoś; Paulina Petri	48.406	
4	1	Great Britain; Katy Marchant; Sophie Capewell; Emma Finucane	46.147	QG
4	2	Ukraine; Tetiana Yashchenko; Oleksandra Lohviniuk; Alla Biletska	51.804	

=== Finals ===
The final was held at 19:20.

Rank	Nation	Time	Behind	Notes
Gold medal race
1st place, gold medalist(s)	Great Britain; Katy Marchant; Sophie Capewell; Emma Finucane	45.949		
2nd place, silver medalist(s)	Netherlands; Kimberly Kalee; Hetty van de Wouw; Steffie van der Peet	46.593	+0.644	
Bronze medal race
3rd place, bronze medalist(s)	Australia; Molly McGill; Kristina Clonan; Alessia McCaig	47.358		
4	Germany; Lara-Sophie Jäger; Alessa-Catriona Pröpster; Clara Schneider	48.188	+0.830	
