= Cycling at the 2022 Commonwealth Games – Women's team sprint =

Cycling Track – Women's team sprint at the 2022 Commonwealth Games
- Venue: Lee Valley VeloPark
- Dates: 29 July
- Competitors: 24 from 8 nations
- Winning time: 47.425

Medalists
gold medal	Ellesse Andrews; Olivia King; Rebecca Petch	New Zealand
silver medal	Lauriane Genest; Kelsey Mitchell; Sarah Orban	Canada
bronze medal	Rhian Edmunds; Emma Finucane; Lowri Thomas	Wales

The women's team sprint at the 2022 Commonwealth Games was part of the cycling programme, and took place on 29 July 2022.

== Records ==
This was the first Commonwealth Games in which the women's team sprint was contested under the new format of three riders racing 750m, so there was no existing Games record. The world record is as follows:

World record	Germany (Pauline Grabosch, Lea Friedrich, Emma Hinze)	46.064	Roubaix, France	20 October 2021

== Schedule ==
The schedule is as follows:

All times are British Summer Time (UTC+1)

Date	Time	Round
Friday 29 July 2022	11:42	Qualifying
Friday 29 July 2022	17:15	Finals

== Results ==
=== Qualifying ===
The two fastest teams advanced to the gold medal final. The next two fastest teams advanced to the bronze medal final.

Rank	Nation	Time	Behind	Notes
1	New Zealand; Rebecca Petch; Olivia King; Ellesse Andrews	47.841	–	QG, GR
2	Canada; Sarah Orban; Kelsey Mitchell; Lauriane Genest	47.956	+0.115	QG
3	Wales; Lowri Thomas; Rhian Edmunds; Emma Finucane	48.095	+0.254	QB
4	Australia; Alessia McCaig; Kristina Clonan; Breanna Hargrave	48.355	+0.514	QB
5	England; Milly Tanner; Sophie Capewell; Blaine Ridge-Davis	48.358	+0.517	
6	Scotland; Iona Muir; Lauren Bell; Lusia Steele	48.650	+0.809	
7	India; Shushikala Agashe; Triyasha Paul; Mayuri Lute	51.433	+3.592	
	Malaysia; Nurul Aliana Syafika Azizan; Nurul Izzah Izzati Mohd Asri; Anis Amira Rosidi	REL		

=== Finals ===
Rank	Nation	Time	Behind	Notes
Gold medal final
1st place, gold medalist(s)	New Zealand; Ellesse Andrews; Olivia King; Rebecca Petch	47.425		GR
2nd place, silver medalist(s)	Canada; Lauriane Genest; Kelsey Mitchell; Sarah Orban	48.001	+0.576	
Bronze medal final
3rd place, bronze medalist(s)	Wales; Rhian Edmunds; Emma Finucane; Lowri Thomas	47.767		
4	Australia; Kristina Clonan; Breanna Hargrave; Alessia McCaig	48.123	+0.356	
