= Cycling at the 2024 Summer Olympics – Women's team sprint =

Women's team sprint at the Games of the XXXIII Olympiad
- Olympic track cycling
- Venues: Vélodrome National de Saint-Quentin-en-Yvelines
- Dates: 5 August 2024
- Competitors: 24 from 8 nations
- Teams: 8
- Winning time: 45.186 WR

Medalists
1st place, gold medalist(s)		Katy Marchant; Sophie Capewell; Emma Finucane	Great Britain
2nd place, silver medalist(s)		Rebecca Petch; Shaane Fulton; Ellesse Andrews	New Zealand
3rd place, bronze medalist(s)		Pauline Grabosch; Emma Hinze; Lea Sophie Friedrich	Germany

The women's team sprint event at the 2024 Summer Olympics took place on 5 August 2024 at the Vélodrome National de Saint-Quentin-en-Yvelines.

== Background ==
This will be the 4th appearance of the event, which has been held at every Summer Olympics since 2012.

== Competition format ==
A team sprint race consists of a three-lap (750 m) race between two teams of three cyclists, starting on opposite sides of the track. Each member of the team must lead for one of the laps. The time for a team is measured to when the last cyclist finishes. Ties are broken by splits on the last lap.

The tournament consists of an initial qualifying round that seeds the teams. The first round comprises head-to-head races based on seeding (1st vs. 8th, 2nd vs. 7th, etc.). The winners of those four heats advance to the medal round, with the two fastest winners competing in the gold medal final and the two slower winners facing off for bronze.

== Schedule ==
All times are Central European Time (UTC+2)

Date	Time	Round
5 August	17:00	Qualifying
5 August	18:55	First round
5 August	19:46	Finals

== Results ==
=== Qualifying ===
Rank	Country	Cyclists	Result	Notes
1	Great Britain	Katy Marchant; Sophie Capewell; Emma Finucane	45.472	WR
2	New Zealand	Rebecca Petch; Shaane Fulton; Ellesse Andrews	45.593	
3	Germany	Pauline Grabosch; Emma Hinze; Lea Sophie Friedrich	45.644	
4	Netherlands	Kyra Lamberink; Hetty van de Wouw; Steffie van der Peet	46.086	
5	China	Guo Yufang; Bao Shanju; Yuan Liying	46.458	
6	Mexico	Jessica Salazar; Yuli Verdugo; Daniela Gaxiola	46.587	
7	Poland	Marlena Karwacka; Urszula Łoś; Nikola Sibiak	47.284	
8	Canada	Sarah Orban; Lauriane Genest; Kelsey Mitchell	47.578	

=== First round ===
Rank	Heat	Country	Cyclists	Result	Notes
1	4	Great Britain	Katy Marchant; Sophie Capewell; Emma Finucane	45.338	QG, WR
2	3	New Zealand	Rebecca Petch; Shaane Fulton; Ellesse Andrews	45.348	QG
3	2	Germany	Pauline Grabosch; Emma Hinze; Lea Sophie Friedrich	45.377	QB
4	1	Netherlands	Kyra Lamberink; Hetty van de Wouw; Steffie van der Peet	45.798	QB
5	2	Mexico	Jessica Salazar; Yuli Verdugo; Daniela Gaxiola	46.198	
6	1	China	Guo Yufang; Bao Shanju; Yuan Liying	46.362	
7	4	Canada	Sarah Orban; Lauriane Genest; Kelsey Mitchell	46.816	
8	3	Poland	Marlena Karwacka; Urszula Łoś; Nikola Sibiak	47.022	

=== Finals ===
Rank	Country	Cyclists	Result	Notes
Gold medal final
1st place, gold medalist(s)	Great Britain	Katy Marchant; Sophie Capewell; Emma Finucane	45.186	WR
2nd place, silver medalist(s)	New Zealand	Rebecca Petch; Shaane Fulton; Ellesse Andrews	45.659	
Bronze medal final
3rd place, bronze medalist(s)	Germany	Pauline Grabosch; Emma Hinze; Lea Sophie Friedrich	45.400	
4	Netherlands	Kyra Lamberink; Hetty van de Wouw; Steffie van der Peet	45.690	
Fifth place final
5	Mexico	Jessica Salazar; Yuli Verdugo; Daniela Gaxiola	46.251	
6	China	Guo Yufang; Bao Shanju; Yuan Liying	46.572	
Seventh place final
7	Poland	Marlena Karwacka; Urszula Łoś; Nikola Sibiak	47.175	
8	Canada	Sarah Orban; Lauriane Genest; Kelsey Mitchell	47.631	
