= 2023 UEC European Track Championships – Women's keirin =

Cycling competition

Women's keirin at the 2023 UEC European Track Championships
- Venue: Tissot Velodrome, Grenchen
- Date: 12 February

Medalists
gold medal	Lea Friedrich	Germany
silver medal	Emma Finucane	Great Britain
bronze medal	Emma Hinze	Germany

The women's keirin competition at the 2023 UEC European Track Championships was held on 12 February 2023.

== Results ==
=== First round ===
The first two riders in each heat qualified for the second round, and all other riders advanced to the first round repechages.

Heat 1

Rank	Name	Nation	Notes
1	Mathilde Gros	France	Q
2	Sophie Capewell	Great Britain	Q
3	Giada Capobianchi	Italy	
4	Urszula Łoś	Poland	
5	Veronika Jaborníková	Czech Republic	
6	Hetty van de Wouw	Netherlands	
7	Miglė Lendel	Lithuania	

Heat 2

Rank	Name	Nation	Notes
1	Lea Sophie Friedrich	Germany	Q
2	Emma Finucane	Great Britain	Q
3	Nicky Degrendele	Belgium	
4	Anna Jaborníková	Czech Republic	
5	Oleksandra Lohviniuk	Ukraine	
6	Taky Marie-Divine Kouamé	France	
7	Miriam Vece	Italy	

Heat 3

Rank	Name	Nation	Notes
1	Steffie van der Peet	Netherlands	Q
2	Emma Hinze	Germany	Q
3	Marlena Karwacka	Poland	
4	Helena Casas	Spain	
5	Orla Walsh	Ireland	
6	Valerie Jenaer	Belgium	
7	Alla Biletska	Ukraine	

=== Repechage ===
The first two riders in each heat qualify to the second round.

Heat 1

Rank	Name	Nation	Notes
1	Giada Capobianchi	Italy	Q
2	Taky Marie-Divine Kouamé	France	Q
3	Alla Biletska	Ukraine	
4	Orla Walsh	Ireland	
5	Anna Jaborníková	Czech Republic	

Heat 2

Rank	Name	Nation	Notes
1	Marlena Karwacka	Poland	Q
2	Helena Casas	Spain	Q
3	Valerie Jenaer	Belgium	
4	Oleksandra Lohviniuk	Ukraine	
5	Miglė Lendel	Lithuania	

Heat 3

Rank	Name	Nation	Notes
1	Nicky Degrendele	Belgium	Q
2	Miriam Vece	Italy	Q
3	Hetty van de Wouw	Netherlands	
4	Urszula Łoś	Poland	
5	Veronika Jaborníková	Czech Republic	

=== Second round ===
The first three riders in each heat qualify to final 1–6, all other riders advance to final 7–12.

Heat 1

Rank	Name	Nation	Notes
1	Emma Hinze	Germany	Q
2	Emma Finucane	Great Britain	Q
3	Mathilde Gros	France	Q
4	Helena Casas	Spain	
5	Giada Capobianchi	Italy	
6	Miriam Vece	Italy	

Heat 2

Rank	Name	Nation	Notes
1	Lea Friedrich	Germany	Q
2	Nicky Degrendele	Belgium	Q
3	Steffie van der Peet	Netherlands	Q
4	Taky Marie-Divine Kouamé	France	
5	Marlena Karwacka	Poland	
6	Sophie Capewell	Great Britain	

=== Final ===
Small final

Rank	Name	Nation	Notes
7	Marlena Karwacka	Poland	
8	Helena Casas	Spain	
9	Taky Marie-Divine Kouamé	France	
10	Sophie Capewell	Great Britain	
11	Miriam Vece	Italy	
12	Giada Capobianchi	Italy	

Final

Rank	Name	Nation	Notes
1st place, gold medalist(s)	Lea Friedrich	Germany	
2nd place, silver medalist(s)	Emma Finucane	Great Britain	
3rd place, bronze medalist(s)	Emma Hinze	Germany	
4	Steffie van der Peet	Netherlands	
5	Nicky Degrendele	Belgium	
6	Mathilde Gros	France	
