= 2024 UEC European Track Championships – Women's sprint =

Women's sprint at the 2024 UEC European Track Championships
- Venue: Omnisport Apeldoorn, Apeldoorn
- Date: 11–12 January
- Competitors: 19 from 11 nations

Medalists
gold medal	Emma Finucane	Great Britain
silver medal	Lea Friedrich	Germany
bronze medal	Emma Hinze	Germany

The women's sprint competition at the 2024 UEC European Track Championships was held on 11 and 12 January 2024.

== Results ==
=== Qualifying ===
The top 13 riders qualified for the 1/8 finals, 14th to 19th places qualified for the 1/16 finals.

Rank	Name	Nation	Time	Behind	Notes
1	Emma Finucane	Great Britain	10.432		Q
2	Mathilde Gros	France	10.493	+0.061	Q
3	Lea Friedrich	Germany	10.517	+0.085	Q
4	Sophie Capewell	Great Britain	10.583	+0.151	Q
5	Emma Hinze	Germany	10.681	+0.249	Q
6	Hetty van de Wouw	Netherlands	10.737	+0.305	Q
7	Nikola Sibiak	Poland	10.898	+0.466	Q
8	Taky Marie-Divine Kouamé	France	10.913	+0.481	Q
9	Steffie van der Peet	Netherlands	10.923	+0.491	Q
10	Nicky Degrendele	Belgium	10.968	+0.536	Q
11	Miriam Vece	Italy	10.969	+0.537	Q
12	Alla Biletska	Ukraine	11.134	+0.702	Q
13	Veronika Jaborníková	Czech Republic	11.254	+0.822	Q
14	Oleksandra Lohviniuk	Ukraine	11.257	+0.825	q
15	Miglė Lendel	Lithuania	11.282	+0.850	q
16	Paulina Petri	Poland	11.340	+0.908	q
17	Natálie Mikšaníková	Czech Republic	11.422	+0.990	q
18	Julie Nicolaes	Belgium	11.499	+1.067	q
19	Helena Casas	Spain	11.679	+1.247	q

=== 1/16 finals ===
Heat winners advanced to the 1/8 finals.

Heat	Rank	Name	Nation	Time	Notes
1	1	Paulina Petri	Poland	X	Q
1	2	Natálie Mikšaníková	Czech Republic	+0.453	
2	1	Julie Nicolaes	Belgium	X	Q
2	2	Miglė Lendel	Lithuania	+0.058	
3	1	Oleksandra Lohviniuk	Ukraine	X	Q
3	2	Helena Casas	Spain	+0.065	

=== 1/8 finals ===
Heat winners advanced to the quarterfinals.

Heat	Rank	Name	Nation	Time	Notes
1	1	Emma Finucane	Great Britain	X	Q
1	2	Paulina Petri	Poland	+0.827	
2	1	Mathilde Gros	France	X	Q
2	2	Julie Nicolaes	Belgium	+0.151	
3	1	Lea Friedrich	Germany	X	Q
3	2	Oleksandra Lohviniuk	Ukraine	+0.254	
4	1	Sophie Capewell	Great Britain	X	Q
4	2	Veronika Jaborníková	Czech Republic	+0.525	
5	1	Emma Hinze	Germany	X	Q
5	2	Alla Biletska	Ukraine	+0.137	
6	1	Hetty van de Wouw	Netherlands	X	Q
6	2	Miriam Vece	Italy	+0.441	
7	1	Nikola Sibiak	Poland	X	Q
7	2	Nicky Degrendele	Belgium	+0.045	
8	1	Taky Marie-Divine Kouamé	France	X	Q
8	2	Steffie van der Peet	Netherlands	+0.123	

=== Quarterfinals ===
Matches are extended to a best-of-three format hereon; winners proceed to the semifinals.

Heat	Rank	Name	Nation	Race 1	Race 2	Decider (i.r.)	Notes
1	1	Emma Finucane	Great Britain	X	X		Q
1	2	Taky Marie-Divine Kouamé	France	+0.555	+0.101		
2	1	Mathilde Gros	France	X	X		Q
2	2	Nikola Sibiak	Poland	+0.157	+0.132		
3	1	Lea Friedrich	Germany	X	X		Q
3	2	Hetty van de Wouw	Netherlands	+0.077	+0.014		
4	1	Emma Hinze	Germany	+0.006	X	X	Q
4	2	Sophie Capewell	Great Britain	X	+0.145	+0.041	

=== Semifinals ===
Winners proceed to the gold medal final; losers proceed to the bronze medal final.

Heat	Rank	Name	Nation	Race 1	Race 2	Decider (i.r.)	Notes
1	1	Emma Finucane	Great Britain	X	X		QG
1	2	Emma Hinze	Germany	+0.044	+0.042		QB
2	1	Lea Friedrich	Germany	X	X		QG
2	2	Mathilde Gros	France	+0.072	+0.113		QB

=== Finals ===
Rank	Name	Nation	Race 1	Race 2	Decider (i.r.)
Gold medal final
1st place, gold medalist(s)	Emma Finucane	Great Britain	X	X	
2nd place, silver medalist(s)	Lea Friedrich	Germany	+0.025	+0.081	
Bronze medal final
3rd place, bronze medalist(s)	Emma Hinze	Germany	X	X	
4	Mathilde Gros	France	+0.523	+0.062	
