= Stefany Cuadrado =

Colombian cyclist (born 2006)

Personal information
- Full name: Stefany Lorena Cuadrado Flórez
- Born: 2 May 2006 (age 20) Caucasia, Antioquia

Cycling career
- Sport: Cycling
- Discipline: Track
- Role: Rider
Medal record
Representing Colombia
Women's track cycling
Event	1st	2nd	3rd
World Championships	0	0	1
World Junior Championships	4	1	0
Pan American Championships	2	5	1
CAC Games	1	2	0
South American Games	3	0	0
Bolivarian Games	3	0	0
Junior Pan American Games	3	0	0
Pan American Junior Championships	7	1	0
Total	23	9	2
World Championships
Bronze medal – third place	2025 Santiago	Keirin
Pan American Championships
Gold medal – first place	2025 Asunción	1 km time trial
Gold medal – first place	2026 Santiago	1 km time trial
Silver medal – second place	2025 Asunción	Sprint
Silver medal – second place	2025 Asunción	Team sprint
Silver medal – second place	2026 Santiago	Keirin
Silver medal – second place	2026 Santiago	Sprint
Silver medal – second place	2026 Santiago	Team sprint
Bronze medal – third place	2025 Asunción	Keirin
Central American and Caribbean Games
Gold medal – first place	2026 Santo Domingo	Sprint
Silver medal – second place	2026 Santo Domingo	Keirin
Silver medal – second place	2026 Santo Domingo	Team sprint
South American Games
Gold medal – first place	2026 Santa Fe	Keirin
Gold medal – first place	2026 Santa Fe	Sprint
Gold medal – first place	2026 Santa Fe	Team sprint
Bolivarian Games
Gold medal – first place	2025 Lima-Ayacucho	Keirin
Gold medal – first place	2025 Lima-Ayacucho	Sprint
Gold medal – first place	2025 Lima-Ayacucho	Team sprint
World Junior Championships
Gold medal – first place	2023 Cali	Keirin
Gold medal – first place	2024 Luoyang	Keirin
Gold medal – first place	2024 Luoyang	Sprint
Gold medal – first place	2024 Luoyang	500 m time trial
Silver medal – second place	2023 Cali	Sprint
Junior Pan American Games
Gold medal – first place	2025 Asunción	Keirin
Gold medal – first place	2025 Asunción	Sprint
Gold medal – first place	2025 Asunción	Team sprint
Pan American Junior Championships
Gold medal – first place	2023 Asunción	Sprint
Gold medal – first place	2023 Asunción	500 m time trial
Gold medal – first place	2023 Asunción	Team sprint
Gold medal – first place	2024 Lima	Keirin
Gold medal – first place	2024 Lima	Sprint
Gold medal – first place	2024 Lima	500 m time trial
Gold medal – first place	2024 Lima	Team sprint
Silver medal – second place	2023 Asunción	Keirin

Stefany Lorena Cuadrado Flórez (born 2 May 2006) is a Colombian track cyclist. She is a multiple-time gold medalist at the Junior Track Cycling World Championships.

== Early life ==
She was born in Caucasia in the Antioquia Department of Colombia. She was a keen table tennis player in her youth. She started cycling during the COVID-19 pandemic.

== Career ==
Cuadrado won the 500 metres track race at the Colombian junior championships in July 2023. She won gold in the keirin at the 2023 UCI Junior Track Cycling World Championships in Cali, Colombia. She won silver in the sprint race at the same championships in August 2023. During the sprint qualification, she set a new national and Pan-American age-group record for the sprint.

Cuadrado won gold medals in the Keirin, sprint, 500 meters and team sprint disciplines at the 2024 Pan American Junior Track Cycling Championships in Lima, Peru. She was selected for the keirin and sprint at the 2024 Summer Olympics. She then won the gold medal in the women's sprint at the 2024 UCI Junior Track Cycling World Championships in China, finishing ahead of Georgette Rand of Great Britain. She also won gold in the keirin and the 500m time trial at the Championships.

Cuadrado won the bronze medal in the women's keirin behind Mina Sato and Emma Finucane at the 2025 UCI Track Cycling World Championships in Santiago, Chile, in October 2025.
