= 2024 Asian Track Cycling Championships =

Bicycle competition in New Delhi, India

- Venue: New Delhi, India
- Date: 21–26 February 2024
- Velodrome: Indira Gandhi Stadium Velodrome

The 2024 Asian Track Cycling Championships (43rd edition) took place at the Indira Gandhi Stadium Velodrome in New Delhi, India from 21 to 26 February 2024.

== Medal summary ==
=== Men ===
Event	Gold	Silver	Bronze
Sprint	Yuta Obara; Japan	Li Zhiwei; China	Shah Firdaus Sahrom; Malaysia
1 km time trial	Li Zhiwei; China	Minato Nakaishi; Japan	Kirill Kurdidi; Kazakhstan
Keirin	Kento Yamasaki; Japan	Li Zhiwei; China	Yung Tsun Ho; Hong Kong
Individual pursuit	Shoi Matsuda; Japan	Mohammad Al-Mutaiwei; United Arab Emirates	Ng Pak Hang; Hong Kong
Points race	Naoki Kojima; Japan	Alisher Zhumakan; Kazakhstan	Mow Ching Yin; Hong Kong
Scratch	Terry Yudha Kusuma; Indonesia	Shunsuke Imamura; Japan	Kim Hyeon-seok; South Korea
Elimination	Shunsuke Imamura; Japan	Nikita Tsvetkov; Uzbekistan	Ramis Dinmukhametov; Kazakhstan
Omnium	Eiya Hashimoto; Japan	Bernard Van Aert; Indonesia	Tso Kai Kwong; Hong Kong
Madison	Japan; Shunsuke Imamura; Kazushige Kuboki	Indonesia; Bernard Van Aert; Terry Yudha Kusuma	Kazakhstan; Alisher Zhumakan; Ramis Dinmukhametov
Team sprint	Japan; Yuta Obara; Kento Yamasaki; Minato Nakaishi	Malaysia; Ridwan Sahrom; Fadhil Zonis; Umar Hasbullah	China; Jin Zhiheng; Li Zhiwei; Liu Kuan
Team pursuit	Japan; Kazushige Kuboki; Naoki Kojima; Shoi Matsuda; Eiya Hashimoto; Shunsuke Imamura	China; Yang Yang; Pei Zhengyu; Zhang Haiao; Zhang Jinyan; Li Boan	Kazakhstan; Alisher Zhumakan; Ramis Dinmukhametov; Ilya Karabutov; Dmitriy Noskov

=== Women ===
Event	Gold	Silver	Bronze
Sprint	Wang Lijuan; China	Tong Mengqi; China	Nurul Izzah Izzati Asri; Malaysia
500 m time trial	Nurul Izzah Izzati Asri; Malaysia	Hwang Hyeon-seo; South Korea	Luo Shuyan; China
Keirin	Nurul Izzah Izzati Asri; Malaysia	Tong Mengqi; China	Anis Amira Rosidi; Malaysia
Individual pursuit	Maho Kakita; Japan	Zhou Menghan; China	Rinata Sultanova; Kazakhstan
Points race	Tsuyaka Uchino; Japan	Margarita Misyurina; Uzbekistan	Leung Bo Yee; Hong Kong
Scratch	Liu Jiali; China	Lee Sze Wing; Hong Kong	Mizuki Ikeda; Japan
Elimination	Yumi Kajihara; Japan	Lee Sze Wing; Hong Kong	Huang Ting-ying; Chinese Taipei
Omnium	Yumi Kajihara; Japan	Liu Jiali; China	Lee Sze Wing; Hong Kong
Madison	Japan; Tsuyaka Uchino; Maho Kakita	Uzbekistan; Olga Zabelinskaya; Nafosat Kozieva	Hong Kong; Leung Wing Yee; Lee Sze Wing
Team sprint	China; Zhou Fei; Tong Mengqi; Luo Shuyan; Wang Lijuan	Malaysia; Nurul Izzah Izzati Asri; Anis Amira Rosidi; Nurul Aliana Syafika Azizan	South Korea; Hwang Hyeon-seo; Kim Ha-eun; Cho Sun-young
Team pursuit	Japan; Tsuyaka Uchino; Maho Kakita; Mizuki Ikeda; Yumi Kajihara	China; Zhang Hongjie; Wang Susu; Wang Xiaoyue; Wei Suwan; Gong Xianbing	South Korea; Song Min-ji; Kim Min-jeong; Kang Hyun-kyung; Lee Eun-hee; Jang Su-ji

== Medal table ==
Rank	Nation	Gold	Silver	Bronze	Total
1	Japan	15	2	1	18
2	China	4	8	2	14
3	Malaysia	2	2	3	7
4	Indonesia	1	2	0	3
5	Uzbekistan	0	3	0	3
6	Hong Kong	0	2	7	9
7	Kazakhstan	0	1	5	6
8	South Korea	0	1	3	4
9	United Arab Emirates	0	1	0	1
10	Chinese Taipei	0	0	1	1
Totals (10 entries)		22	22	22	66
