= Emma Finucane =

British cyclist (born 2002)

Emma Finucane MBE, OLY
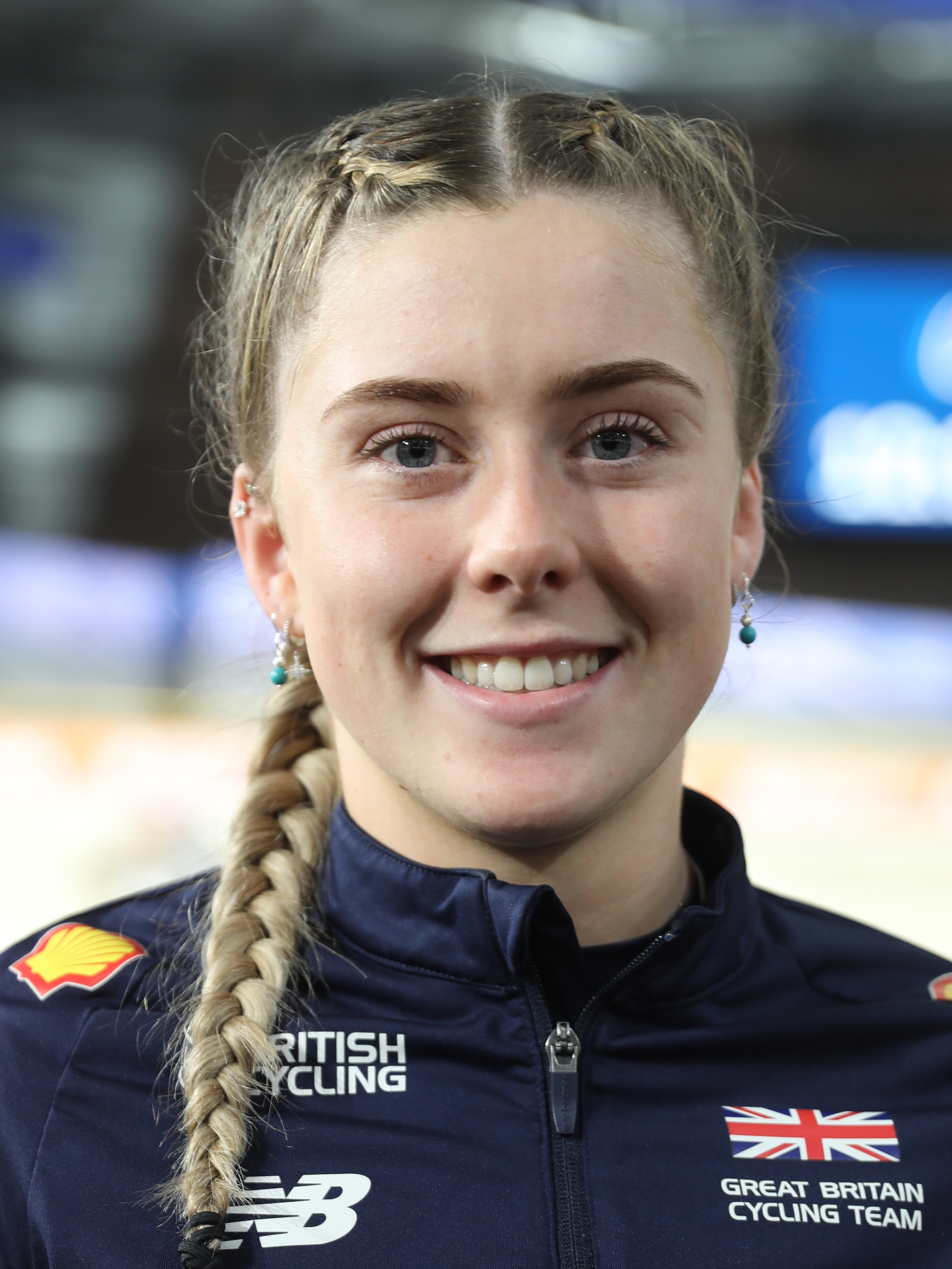
- Finucane in 2024

Personal information
- Full name: Emma Marion Finucane
- Born: 22 December 2002 (age 23) Carmarthen, Wales
- Height: 171 cm (5 ft 7 in)

Cycling career
- Sport: Cycling
- Current team: Team Inspired
- Discipline: Track cycling
- Role: Rider
- Rider type: Sprint, Time trial, Keirin
Medal record
Women's track cycling
Representing Great Britain
Olympic Games
| Gold medal – first place | 2024 Paris | Team sprint |
| Bronze medal – third place | 2024 Paris | Keirin |
| Bronze medal – third place | 2024 Paris | Sprint |
World Championships
| Gold medal – first place | 2023 Glasgow | Sprint |
| Gold medal – first place | 2024 Ballerup | Sprint |
| Gold medal – first place | 2024 Ballerup | Team sprint |
| Silver medal – second place | 2023 Glasgow | Team sprint |
| Silver medal – second place | 2025 Santiago | Team sprint |
| Silver medal – second place | 2025 Santiago | Keirin |
| Silver medal – second place | 2026 Shanghai | Sprint |
| Silver medal – second place | 2026 Shanghai | Team sprint |
| Bronze medal – third place | 2022 Saint-Quentin-en-Yvelines | Team sprint |
| Bronze medal – third place | 2026 Shanghai | Keirin |
European Championships
| Gold medal – first place | 2024 Apeldoorn | Sprint |
| Gold medal – first place | 2026 Konya | Sprint |
| Silver medal – second place | 2023 Grenchen | Keirin |
| Silver medal – second place | 2023 Grenchen | Team sprint |
| Silver medal – second place | 2024 Apeldoorn | Keirin |
| Silver medal – second place | 2024 Apeldoorn | Team sprint |
Representing Wales
Commonwealth Games
| Gold medal – first place | 2026 Glasgow | Sprint |
| Gold medal – first place | 2026 Glasgow | 1 km time trial |
| Gold medal – first place | 2026 Glasgow | Keirin |
| Gold medal – first place | 2026 Glasgow | Team sprint |
| Bronze medal – third place | 2022 Birmingham | Team sprint |
| Bronze medal – third place | 2022 Birmingham | Sprint |

Emma Marion Finucane (/fɪˈnuːkən/ fin-OO-kən; born 22 December 2002) is a Welsh track cyclist. She is an Olympic gold medallist in the team sprint, a double world and European champion in the sprint, and a world and European champion in the team sprint. At the 2024 Summer Olympics, she became the first British woman to win three medals at a single games since Mary Rand in 1964.

In 2019, Finucane became the Junior European champion in the 500 m time trial. At the senior level, she won two bronze medals for Wales at the 2022 Commonwealth Games, in the sprint and the team sprint, and she became a world champion for the first time at the 2023 World Track Cycling Championships when she triumphed in the sprint. Her victory made her the third British woman to become world sprint champion, after Victoria Pendleton and Becky James. Finucane earned further success in 2024, becoming the European champion in the sprint, winning three gold medals at the Track Cycling Nations Cup in Hong Kong, and then winning her first Olympic gold medal at the 2024 Summer Olympics in Paris. There, she was a member of the British team sprint line-up who set a new world record on their way to gold, and she added two further bronze medals in the sprint and the keirin. She completed 2024 by becoming a world champion in the team sprint for the first time, and she also successfully defended her world sprint title.

At the 2026 Commonwealth Games, she won four gold medals and became simultaneously Wales' most decorated female athlete in the history of the competition, and the first sprint cyclist, male or female, to win all four track sprint events in the history of the Games.

== Early life and junior career ==
Finucane was born on 22 December 2002, and grew up in the caretaker's house at Picton Barracks in Carmarthen, Wales. She attended St John Lloyd Catholic Comprehensive School in Llanelli, and started cycling aged eight at Carmarthen Velodrome, where she cycled with her brother and sister. She joined local club Towy Riders before later training at the Wales National Velodrome in Newport. She has since stated that Welsh cyclist Nicole Cooke was her idol while she was growing up.

Finucane was spotted by British Cycling in 2018, and that same year won four national titles in the under-16 category. They came in the 500 m time trial, sprint, scratch race and madison disciplines. In 2019, she became Junior European Champion in the 500 m time trial as well as finishing runner-up in both the sprint and team sprint. Finucane then won bronze medals in the sprint and the 500 m time trial disciplines at the 2019 UCI Junior Track Cycling World Championships in Frankfurt. Two years after she was first spotted by British Cycling, she moved to Manchester, the home of the National Cycling Centre.

== Senior career ==
Finucane won two silver medals at the 2020 British National Track Championships, which came in the 500 m time trial and keirin, respectively. In 2021, she won silver in the team sprint at the UEC Under-23/Junior Track European Championships in Apeldoorn, Netherlands. Racing alongside Rhian Edmunds and Lowri Thomas, Finucane became a senior national champion for the first time with victory in the team sprint at the 2022 British National Track Championships. She also won a silver medal in the keirin and bronze medals in both the sprint and the 500 m time trial. Representing Wales, Finucane, Thomas and Edmunds finished in third position in the team sprint at the Track Nations Cup meeting in Glasgow.

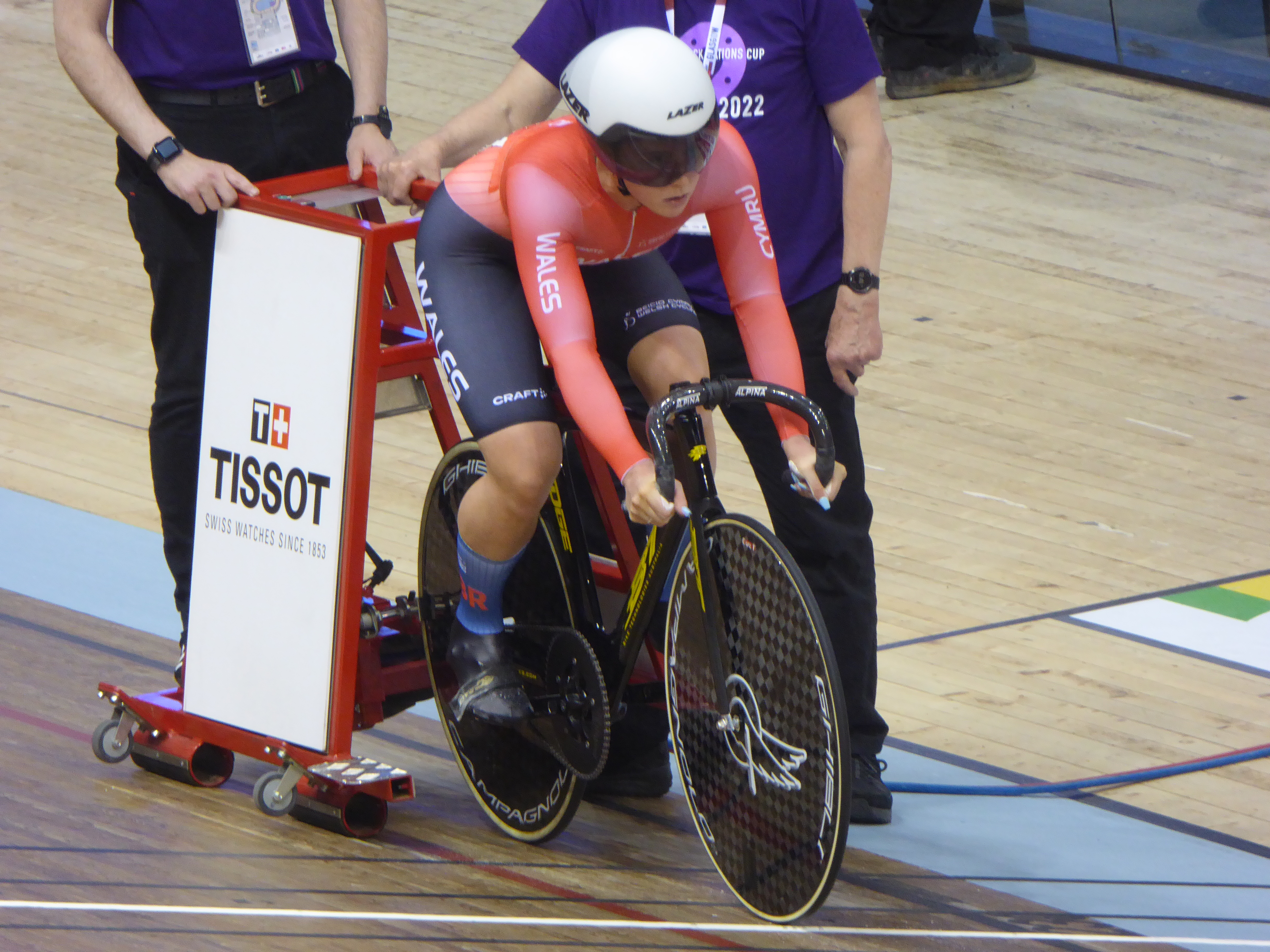
Finucane at the 2022 UCI Track Cycling Nations Cup in Glasgow

Again representing Wales, Finucane won two bronze medals at the 2022 Commonwealth Games in Birmingham. She overcame Sophie Capewell of England in the bronze medal race in the sprint, and competing alongside Edmunds and Thomas, she claimed bronze in the team sprint. Finucane described her two medals as "above and beyond" her expectations. She also finished fourth in the Kierin and fifth in the 500 m time trial. In the team sprint at the 2022 UEC European Track Championships, Finucane and Capewell inadvertently touched wheels during the race which resulted in a crash; neither were injured but it ended their participation in the race. Later that year, Finucane made her debut appearance at the UCI Track Cycling World Championships. Competing for Great Britain, she helped secure bronze in the team sprint with Lauren Bell and Capewell.

Finucane won four national titles at the 2023 British Cycling National Track Championships, taking her career total of national titles to five. Her victories came in the 500 m time trial, the sprint, the keirin and the team sprint (with Katy Marchant and Milly Tanner). At the 2023 UEC European Track Championships in Grenchen, Switzerland, Finucane won silver medals in both the team sprint and the keirin. In the Track Cycling Nations Cup, she won bronze medals in the sprint and team sprint at the first round in Jakarta, before claiming sprint gold at the next round in Cairo.

At the 2023 UCI Track Cycling World Championships in Glasgow, Finucane claimed her first senior world title. Having exited the keirin at the quarter-finals stage earlier in the competition, she took gold in the sprint. Her success made her the first British woman to become the world sprint champion since Becky James in 2013, and the third British woman overall (after Victoria Pendleton and James). She sealed victory by beating German rider Lea Friedrich in the final. Finucane also set a new sea level record time during her 200 m qualifying ride for the sprint. Later in the competition, she was a member of the British trio who claimed silver in the team sprint. Finucane was named 2023 BBC Cymru Wales Sports Personality of the Year.

Finucane won silver in the team sprint, silver in the keirin and gold in the sprint at the 2024 UEC European Track Championships in Apeldoorn. Her gold in the sprint marked the first time that a British woman had claimed the European sprint title. Her gold and two silvers also marked the best ever performance by a British sprinter, male or female, at the European Track Cycling Championships. In February, Finucane won gold in the team sprint at the Track Cycling Nations Cup in Adelaide, and the following month she won three gold medals at the next meeting of the competition in Hong Kong, triumphing in the sprint, team sprint and keirin.

At the 2024 Summer Olympics in Paris, Finucane, alongside teammates Capewell and Marchant, won the gold medal in the team sprint. The trio broke the world record three times during the event, ultimately setting the new record at 45.186 seconds in the final against New Zealand. Their success marked the first time that Great Britain had won Olympic gold in the women's team sprint. Finucane added bronze medals in the keirin, and the sprint. In the latter, she was defeated by Ellesse Andrews of New Zealand in the semi-finals, but recovered to beat Dutch rider Hetty van de Wouw in the bronze medal race. She became the first British woman to win three medals in a single Olympic Games since Mary Rand in 1964. Finucane called her experience in Paris "a rollercoaster", later adding that she had felt "overwhelmed" by the expectation on her to perform, and had learned to release her emotions before she raced.

Finucane again teamed up with Capewell and Marchant to win gold in the team sprint at the 2024 UCI Track Cycling World Championships in Ballerup, Denmark. They defeated the Netherlands in the final to claim the title. Victory marked the first time since 2008 that Great Britain had become women's team sprint world champions. She then went on to defend her world sprint title, overcoming van de Wouw in the gold medal race. She competed in the 2024 UCI Track Champions League, and won the sprint races in Paris and London. Finucane was named BBC Cymru Wales Sports Personality of the Year for a second successive year in December 2024. At the end of the year, she stated that she would concentrate on her training in 2025, and would not participate at either the British or European Track Championships.

In October, Finucane competed at the 2025 UCI Track Cycling World Championships in Santiago, Chile. In the team sprint, she rode alongside teammates Iona Moir and Rhianna Parris-Smith, with the trio finishing in the silver-medal position. She then attempted to defend her world sprint title, but was eliminated after a relegation following a rules infraction on track. Finucane concluded her championships with a silver medal in the keirin, after finishing behind Japan's Mina Sato.

Finucane competed at the 2026 European Championships in Konya, Turkey, and set a new world record time of 9.759 seconds in the 200 m flying lap on her way to becoming the European champion in the sprint. She overcame her compatriot Capewell in the final. Later that month, at the National Track Championships, she won a hat-trick of titles in the team sprint, sprint and keirin disciplines. In April, Finucane won three medals at the 2026 UCI Track World Cup event in Hong Kong. She won gold in the sprint, silver in the team sprint, and bronze in the keirin. At a subsequent race in the series in Nilai, Malaysia, she won the sprint, and finished third in the keirin.

At the 2026 Commonwealth Games in Glasgow, Finucane won gold in the team sprint alongside Edmunds and Thomas. The trio from Wales twice broke the Commonwealth Games record during the event, recording a time of 46.760 in the final to defeat England. One day later, she won her second gold medal at the competition in the sprint. She qualified with a Games record time of 10.322, before beating Andrews, Edmunds and Capewell to secure victory. The following day, Finucane became the first Welsh woman to win three gold medals at a single Commonwealth Games with victory in the 1 km time trial. She ended with a time of 1.05.285. She secured her fourth gold medal of the week by winning the keirin. She finished ahead of Andrews and Kristina Clonan of Australia. Finucane became the first sprint cyclist to win four gold medals at the same Games, and overtook para-sprinter Olivia Breen as the most decorated Welsh woman in Commonwealth Games history. She was then selected to be the flagbearer for Wales at the closing ceremony.

At the 2026 UCI Track Cycling World Championships in Shanghai, Finucane, Capewell and Parris-Smith won the silver medal in the team sprint, after being defeated by China in the final. The team were hindered after Capewell's saddle snapped during the race. She then qualified for the final of the sprint by defeating Capewell in the semi-finals, but suffered a loss to China's Yuan Liying to finish in silver. She finished the championships with a bronze in the keirin.

== Personal life ==
Finucane is a great niece of Irish Second World War RAF pilot Wing Commander Brendan 'Paddy' Finucane (1920–1942), who in June 1942 became the RAF's youngest wing commander at the age of 21. In August 2024, she was reportedly in a relationship with fellow track cyclist Matthew Richardson. Finucane was appointed Member of the Order of the British Empire (MBE) in the 2025 New Year Honours for services to cycling.

== Major results ==
=== Track ===
2018
British National Youth Track Championships (under-16)

1st 500 m time trial
1st Sprint
1st Scratch race
1st Madison (with Sophie Lewis)

2019
UEC European Track Championships (under-23 & junior)

1st, Junior 500 m time trial
2nd, Junior team sprint
2nd, Junior sprint

UCI Junior Track Cycling World Championships

3rd Sprint
3rd 500 m time trial

2020
British National Track Championships

2nd Keirin
2nd 500 m time trial

2021
UEC European Track Championships (under-23 & junior)

2nd Under-23 Team sprint

2022
British National Track Championships

1st Team sprint (with Rhian Edmunds and Lowri Thomas)
2nd Keirin
3rd Sprint
3rd 500 m time trial

UCI Track Cycling Nations Cup

3rd Team sprint, Glasgow (with Rhian Edmunds and Lowri Thomas)

Commonwealth Games

3rd Team sprint (with Rhian Edmunds and Lowri Thomas)
3rd Sprint

UCI Track Cycling World Championships

3rd Team sprint (with Sophie Capewell and Lauren Bell)

2023
British National Track Championships

1st Team sprint (with Katy Marchant and Milly Tanner)
1st Sprint
1st Keirin
1st 500 m time trial

UEC European Track Championships

2nd Sprint
2nd Team sprint (with Katy Marchant and Lauren Bell)

UCI Track Cycling Nations Cup

3rd Sprint, Jakarta
3rd Team sprint, Jakarta (with Sophie Capewell and Lauren Bell)
1st Sprint, Cairo

UCI Track Cycling World Championships

1st Sprint
2nd Team sprint (with Sophie Capewell and Lauren Bell)

2024
UEC European Track Championships

1st Sprint
2nd Team sprint (with Katy Marchant, Sophie Capewell and Lowri Thomas)

UCI Track Cycling Nations Cup

1st Team Sprint, Adelaide (with Katy Marchant and Sophie Capewell)
1st Sprint, Hong Kong
1st Team sprint, Hong Kong (with Katy Marchant and Sophie Capewell)
1st Keirin, Hong Kong

Olympic Games

1st Team sprint (with Katy Marchant and Sophie Capewell)
3rd Keirin
3rd Sprint

UCI Track Cycling World Championships

1st Team sprint (with Katy Marchant and Sophie Capewell)
1st Sprint

2025
UCI Track Cycling World Championships

2nd Team Sprint (with Iona Moir and Rhianna Parris-Smith)
2nd Keirin

2026
UEC European Track Championships

1st Sprint

British National Track Championships

1st Team sprint (with Lowri Thomas, Rhianna Parris-Smith and Lauren Bell)
1st Sprint
1st Keirin

UCI Track World Cup

1st Sprint, Hong Kong
2nd Team sprint (with Lauren Bell and Rhianna Parris-Smith), Hong Kong
3rd Keirin, Hong Kong
1st Sprint, Nilai
3rd Keirin, Nilai

Commonwealth Games

1st Team sprint (with Lowri Thomas and Rhian Edmunds)
1st Sprint
1st 1 km time trial
1st Keirin

UCI Track Cycling World Championships

2nd Team sprint (with Sophie Capewell and Rhianna Parris-Smith)
2nd Sprint
3rd Keirin

=== Road ===
2016
1st British National Circuit Race Championships (under 14)
2017
1st British National Circuit Race Championships (under 16)
