= Shaane Fulton =

New Zealand cyclist (born 2000)

Personal information
- Born: 3 October 2000 (age 26) Nelson, New Zealand

Cycling career
- Sport: Cycling
- Discipline: Track
- Role: Rider
- Rider type: Sprinter
Medal record
Women's track cycling
Representing New Zealand
Olympic Games
Silver medal – second place	2024 Paris	Team sprint

Shaane Fulton (born 3 October 2000) is a track cyclist from New Zealand. She was a silver medalist in the team sprint at the 2024 Summer Olympics.

== Early life ==
From Nelson, New Zealand, Fulton moved up to Waikato in 2019.

== Career ==
In 2021, Fulton had to overcome surgery known as a periacetablular osteotomy on a genetic condition that affected the mobility in her hips.

She was selected for the team sprint at the 2023 UCI Track Cycling World Championships in Glasgow, in which the New Zealand team placed fifth. That month, she set a new national record as she won the 500 m time trial title at the Cycling New Zealand national championships.

She raced as part of the New Zealand sprint team that contested the UCI Nations Cup in Hong Kong in March 2024.

She competed at the 2024 Paris Olympics in the team sprint, and was part of the team on 5 August 2024 that briefly set a new world record in the qualifying heats, and won the silver medal.

== Personal life ==
Her parents Karen and Dean were pro cyclists. She was very close friends with teammate Olivia Podmore prior to her death in 2021.
