= Rhianna Parris-Smith =

British track cyclist (born 2002)

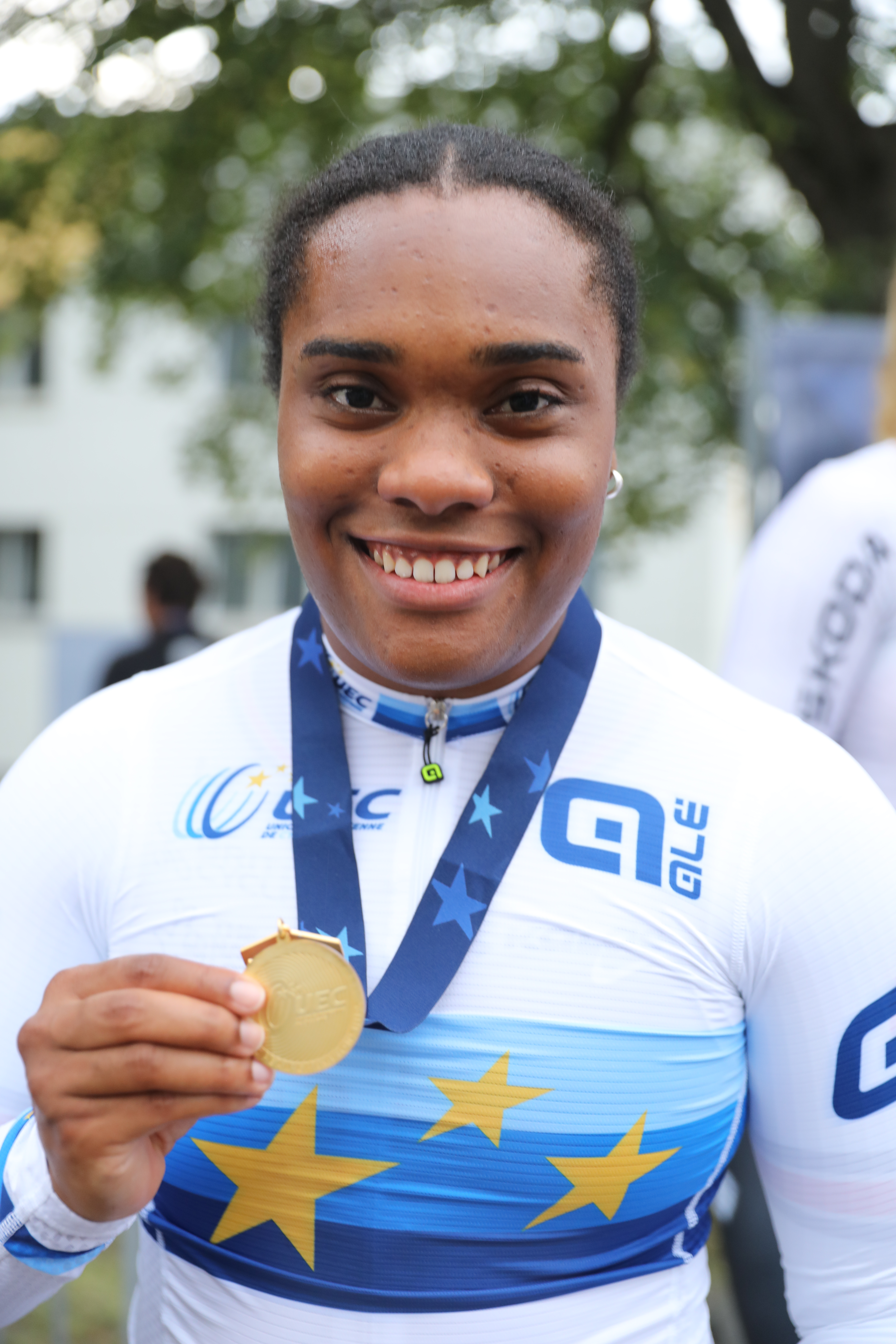
- Rhianna Parris-Smith (2024) - European champion team sprint (U23)

Personal information
- Born: 10 July 2002 (age 24)

Cycling career
- Sport: Cycling
- Current team: Team Inspired
- Discipline: Track
- Role: Rider
- Rider type: Sprinter
Medal record
Women's track cycling
Representing Great Britain
World Championships
Silver medal – second place	2025 Santiago	Team sprint
Silver medal – second place	2026 Shanghai	Team sprint
European Championships
Silver medal – second place	2025 Heusden-Zolder	Team sprint
Silver medal – second place	2026 Konya	Team sprint
U23 & Junior European Championships
Gold medal – first place	2023 Anadia	500m time trial
Gold medal – first place	2023 Anadia	team sprint
Representing England
Commonwealth Games
Silver medal – second place	2026 Glasgow	Team sprint

Rhianna Parris-Smith (born 10 July 2002) is an English international track cyclist.

== Early life ==
Parris-Smith was born in England and is of Afro-Caribbean descent. She went to the Hertfordshire Sports College before studying Sport Coaching and Development at the University of Derby.

== Career ==
Parris-Smith was a 100 and 200 metre runner for the Kettering Town Harriers before joining the GB sprint programme in 2023. She then won double gold at the U23 & Junior European Championships (500m time trial & team sprint) in Anadia, Portugal.

At the 2024 British Cycling National Track Championships she won her first national title, after winning the Individual Time Trial Championships.

In October 2025, she made her senior debut in the Track Cycling World Championships in Santiago, where she clinched a silver medal in the team sprint, while riding alongside teammates Emma Finucane and Iona Moir.

At the 2026 European Championships in Konya, Parris-Smith was a member of the British trio who were defeated by Germany in the final of the team sprint. In the 2026 UCI Track World Cup in Hong Kong, she won a silver medal in the team sprint.

At the 2026 Commonwealth Games in Glasgow, Parris-Smith won silver in the team sprint alongside Sophie Capewell and Katy Marchant. The trio from England were defeated by the Welsh team in the gold medal race.

At the 2026 UCI Track Cycling World Championships in Shanghai, Parris-Smith, Finucane and Capewell finished with a silver medal in the team sprint, after being defeated by China in the final.

== Major results ==
2023
U23 & Junior European Championships

1st time trial
1st team sprint

2024
National Track Championships

1st Time trial

U23 & Junior European Championships
1st team sprint

2025
UEC European Track Championships

2nd Team sprint (with Rhian Edmunds and Lauren Bell)

UCI Track Cycling World Championships

2nd Team Sprint (with Emma Finucane and Iona Moir)

2026
UEC European Championships

2nd Team sprint

2026 UCI Track World Cup

2nd Team sprint (with Lauren Bell and Emma Finucane), Hong Kong

Commonwealth Games

2nd Team sprint (with Sophie Capewell and Katy Marchant)

UCI Track Cycling World Championships

2nd Team Sprint (with Sophie Capewell and Emma Finucane)
