= Yana Burlakova =

Russian cyclist

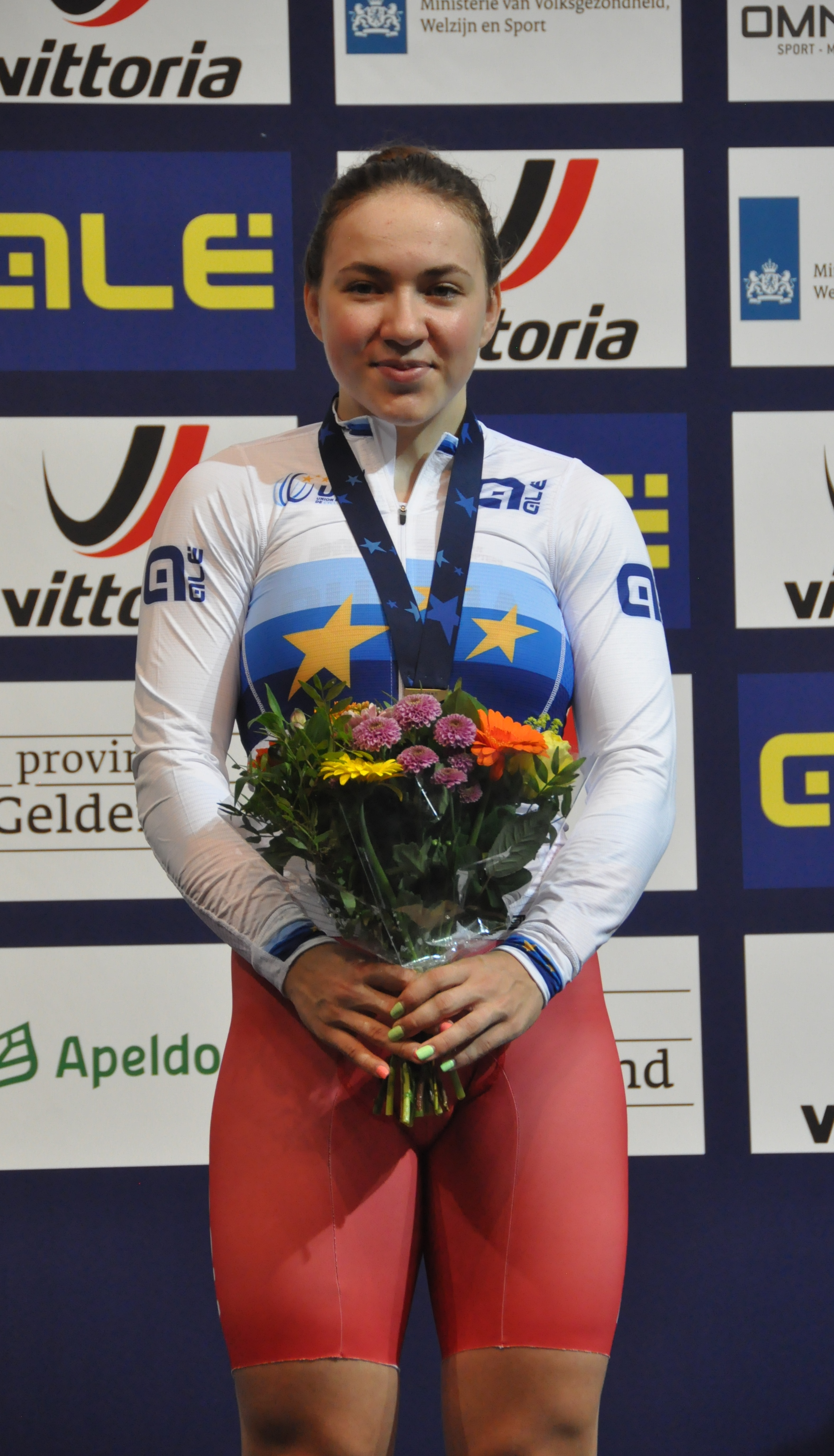

Personal information
- Born: 1 August 2000 (age 26)

Cycling career
- Sport: Cycling
- Discipline: Track
- Role: Rider
Medal record
Women's track cycling
Representing Individual Neutral Athletes
World Championships
Gold medal – first place	2024 Ballerup	500 m time trial
Silver medal – second place	2025 Santiago	1 km time trial
European Championships
Gold medal – first place	2025 Heusden-Zolder	Sprint
Bronze medal – third place	2026 Konya	1 km time trial
Representing Russian Cycling Federation
World Championships
Silver medal – second place	2021 Roubaix	Team sprint
Bronze medal – third place	2021 Roubaix	Keirin
Representing Russia
European Championships
Bronze medal – third place	2021 Grenchen	Keirin
Bronze medal – third place	2021 Grenchen	500 m time trial
Bronze medal – third place	2021 Grenchen	Team sprint

Yana Ivanovna Burlakova (née Tyshchenko, Russian: Яна Ивановна Бурлакова (Тыщенко); born 1 August 2000) is a Russian track cyclist.

She won a medal at the 2021 UCI Track Cycling World Championships.
