= Dahlia Palmer =

Jamaican track cyclist (born 1992)

Personal information
- Born: 24 September 1992 (age 33) Hanover Parish, Jamaica

Sport
- Sport: Track cycling
Medal record
Representing Jamaica
Pan American Games
Bronze medal – third place	2023 Santiago	Keirin

Dahlia Palmer (born 24 September 1992) is a Jamaican track cyclist who is based in Trinidad and Tobago. She won the women's elite sprint and keirin events at the 2022 Caribbean Track Championships. In 2023 she won the bronze medal at the keirin event of the Pan American Games.
