= Tong Mengqi =

Chinese cyclist (born 2003)

Personal information
- Born: 30 August 2003 (age 23)

Cycling career
- Sport: Cycling
- Discipline: Track cycling
- Role: Rider
- Rider type: Sprinter
Medal record
Women's track cycling
Representing China
World Championships
| Gold medal – first place | 2026 Shanghai | Team sprint |
Asian Championships
| Gold medal – first place | 2024 New Delhi | Team sprint |
| Gold medal – first place | 2026 Tagaytay | Team sprint |

Tong Mengqi (Chinese: 童梦琦; born 30 August 2003) is a Chinese track cyclist who competes in sprinting events. She won a gold medal at the 2026 UCI Track Cycling World Championships.

== Career ==
In March 2026, she competed at the 2026 Asian Track Cycling Championships and won a gold medal in the team sprint event. In October 2026, she competed at the 2026 UCI Track Cycling World Championships and won a gold medal in the team sprint event with a time of 45.578 seconds. This was China's first gold medal in the event at the UCI Track Cycling World Championships since 2015.
