= Shanghai Velodrome =

Cycling venue in Shanghai, China

Shanghai Velodrome (上海自行车馆) is an indoor bicycle venue located in Chongming District, Shanghai, China, which opened on 28 December 2023.

The building was designed by Tongji Architectural Design (Group) Co., Ltd., incorporating arcs and repeated origami-like forms. With a total floor area of 30,966 square meters, it includes a velodrome, a BMX venue, ancillary facilities, and an outdoor dirt sprint track.

The Velodrome itself has three main levels: the first floor includes various competition function rooms as well as logistics and equipment rooms; the second floor contains a 250-meter standard wooden track, with a lounge hall around it; the third floor has spectator seating and corridors.

The track will host the 2026 UCI Track Cycling World Championships.
