= Guo Yufang =

Chinese cyclist (born 1999)

Personal information
- Born: 15 March 1999 (age 27)

Cycling career
- Sport: Cycling
- Discipline: Track
- Role: Rider
Medal record
Women's track cycling
Representing China
World Championships
Silver medal – second place	2022 Saint-Quentin-en-Yvelines	Team sprint
Bronze medal – third place	2022 Saint-Quentin-en-Yvelines	500 m time trial
Bronze medal – third place	2023 Glasgow	Team sprint
Asian Games
Gold medal – first place	2022 Hangzhou	Team sprint
Asian Championships
Gold medal – first place	2019 Jakarta	Team sprint
Gold medal – first place	2023 Nilai	Team sprint
Gold medal – first place	2025 Nilai	Team sprint
Silver medal – second place	2025 Nilai	Sprint
Bronze medal – third place	2025 Nilai	Keirin

Guo Yufang (Chinese: 郭裕芳; pinyin: Guō Yùfāng; born 15 March 1999) is a Chinese racing cyclist. She rode in the women's sprint event at the 2018 UCI Track Cycling World Championships.
