= Aki Sakai =

Japanese cyclist

Personal information
- Born: 19 September 2001 (age 25) Japan

Cycling career
- Sport: Cycling
- Discipline: Track
- Role: Rider

Professional team
- 2023–: Team Rakuten K Dreams
Medal record
Representing Japan
Women's track cycling
Asian Championships
Silver medal – second place	2023 Nilai	Team sprint
Bronze medal – third place	2023 Nilai	500m time trial
Bronze medal – third place	2025 Nilai	Team sprint

Aki Sakai (酒井亜紀, Sakai Aki; born 19 September 2001) is a Japanese racing cyclist who represents Team Rakuten K Dreams at professional level and the Japanese national cycling team. She is also active in Japan as a keirin cyclist.

== Career ==
Akai holds the record for the fastest lap in a 250 m time trial race with 19.137 seconds, performance scored during the 2023 Asian Track Cycling Championships. She also shares the record for the best time in a 750m Team sprint race alongside Mina Sato and Riyu Ohta during the 2023 Japanese Championships.
