= Fuko Umekawa =

Japanese cyclist

Personal information
- Born: 1 March 1991 (age 35) Fujimi, Nagano, Japan
- Height: 1.58 m (5 ft 2 in)
- Weight: 60 kg (132 lb)

Cycling career
- Sport: Cycling
- Discipline: Track cycling
- Role: Rider
Medal record
Women's track cycling
Representing Japan
Asian Championships
Silver medal – second place	2023 Nilai	Keirin
Silver medal – second place	2023 Nilai	Team sprint
Bronze medal – third place	2023 Nilai	Sprint

Fuko Umekawa (梅川風子, Umekawa Fuko; born 1 March 1991) is a Japanese track cyclist. She is also active in Japan as a keirin cyclist.

== Biography ==
Fuko Umekawa grew up in the prefecture Nagano. After high school graduation, she joined the speedskating team of the Yamanashi Gakuin University. During her career as a speedskater, she won the 500m race at the All Japan Student Speedskating Championships.

In 2016, she quit speedskating and decided to continue her career as a keirin athlete. She took this decision, since she did not want to throw away her athletic assets, her powerful thighs.

Fuko Umekawa is 158 cm (62 in) tall and weighs about 60 kg (130 lb). Her thighs measured 62 cm (24.5 in) in 2017, and have even gained substantial muscle mass and size since then.

She was admitted to the class 112 at the Keirin Academy of the Japanese Keirin Association (JKA), graduated in 2017 as the third best rookie and was awarded with the Golden Cap. Since then, she participates in competitions of the professional Girls Keirin League.

From July 2017 to December 2023, she won 200 of the 315 races she participated. Her victory coefficient is 63.5%. As of November 2023, she has won a total prize money of ¥61 million.

In 2018, she won the Girls Grand Prix Trial. In 2019, she was the winner of the Girls Fresh Queen. In the following year, she won the Nagoya Stage Artemis Award (Girls Keirin Collection).

She is a member of the national track cycling team of Japan since July 2020. On 26 February 2023 she won her first medal in an international competition at the UCI Track Cycling Nations Cup in Jakarta. Her personal bests are 10.643 seconds in 200m flying and 34.927 in 500m time trial.

She won the Keirin Festival Women Championship in Kokura in November 2023, and placed second at the Girls Keirin Grand Prix on 29 December 2023. She placed fifth in the keirin race at the 2024 UCI Track World Championships in Copenhagen.
