= Molly McGill =

Australian cyclist (born 2001)

Personal information
- Born: 25 June 2001 (age 25) Beaudesert, Queensland, Australia

Cycling career
- Sport: Cycling
- Disciplines: Track; BMX
- Role: Rider
- Rider type: Track sprinting
Medal record
Women's track cycling
Representing Australia
World Championships
Bronze medal – third place	2024 Ballerup	Team sprint
Bronze medal – third place	2025 Santiago	Team sprint

Molly McGill (born 25 June 2001) is an Australian professional racing cyclist who specializes in track cycling and BMX.

== Career ==
In October 2024, McGill won a bronze medal in the team sprint at the Track World Championships.
