= Rebecca Petch =

New Zealand cyclist (born 1998)

Personal information
- Born: 9 July 1998 (age 28) Te Awamutu, New Zealand

Cycling career
- Sport: Cycling
- Disciplines: BMX racing, Track cycling
- Role: Rider
Medal record
Women's track cycling
Representing New Zealand
Olympic Games
Silver medal – second place	2024 Paris	Team sprint
Commonwealth Games
Gold medal – first place	2022 Birmingham	Team sprint

Rebecca Petch (born 9 July 1998) is a New Zealand cyclist who competes in BMX Racing and track cycling. She competed at the 2020 Summer Olympics, in Women's BMX race. She was a silver medalist on the track in the team sprint at the 2024 Paris Olympics.

== Career ==
From Te Awamutu, Petch started riding BMX aged 3. At the UCI BMX World Championships she came 15th at Rock Hill in 2017, she finished 11th in Baku in 2018, and 25th in Heusden-Zolder in 2019.

On 17 June 2021, Petch was selected in her country's Olympic squad as New Zealand's sole BMX rider for the delayed Tokyo 2020 Summer Games.

Petch was a gold medalist at the 2022 Commonwealth Games in the Women's Team sprint competition.

She was selected for the team sprint at the 2023 UCI Track Cycling World Championships in Glasgow, in which the New Zealand team placed fifth.

She raced as part of the New Zealand team sprint side that contested the UCI Nations Cup in Hong Kong in March 2024.

She competed at the 2024 Paris Olympics in the team sprint, and was part of the team on 5 August 2024 that briefly set a new world record record in the qualifying heats, and won the silver medal.

== Personal life ==
Petch previously ran a coffee cart operation in Cambridge, New Zealand, called Little Petchy. She and husband Jarrod Browning run a business, Elite Spouting Services. They announced they were expecting their first child in 2025.
