= Olivia King =

New Zealand track cyclist

Personal information
- Born: 25 January 2001 (age 25) Waikato, New Zealand

Cycling career
- Sport: Cycling
- Discipline: Track cycling
- Role: Rider
Medal record
Women's track cycling
Representing New Zealand
Commonwealth Games
Gold medal – first place	2022 Birmingham	Team sprint

Olivia King (born 25 January 2001) is a New Zealand track cyclist.

Initially a road cyclist, University of Waikato student Olivia King began transitioning to track racing and by 2019 was selected for the Junior Track World Championships held in Germany.

King was a gold medalist at the 2022 Commonwealth Games in the Women’s Team sprint competition.
