= Taky Marie-Divine Kouamé =

French track cyclist (born 2002)

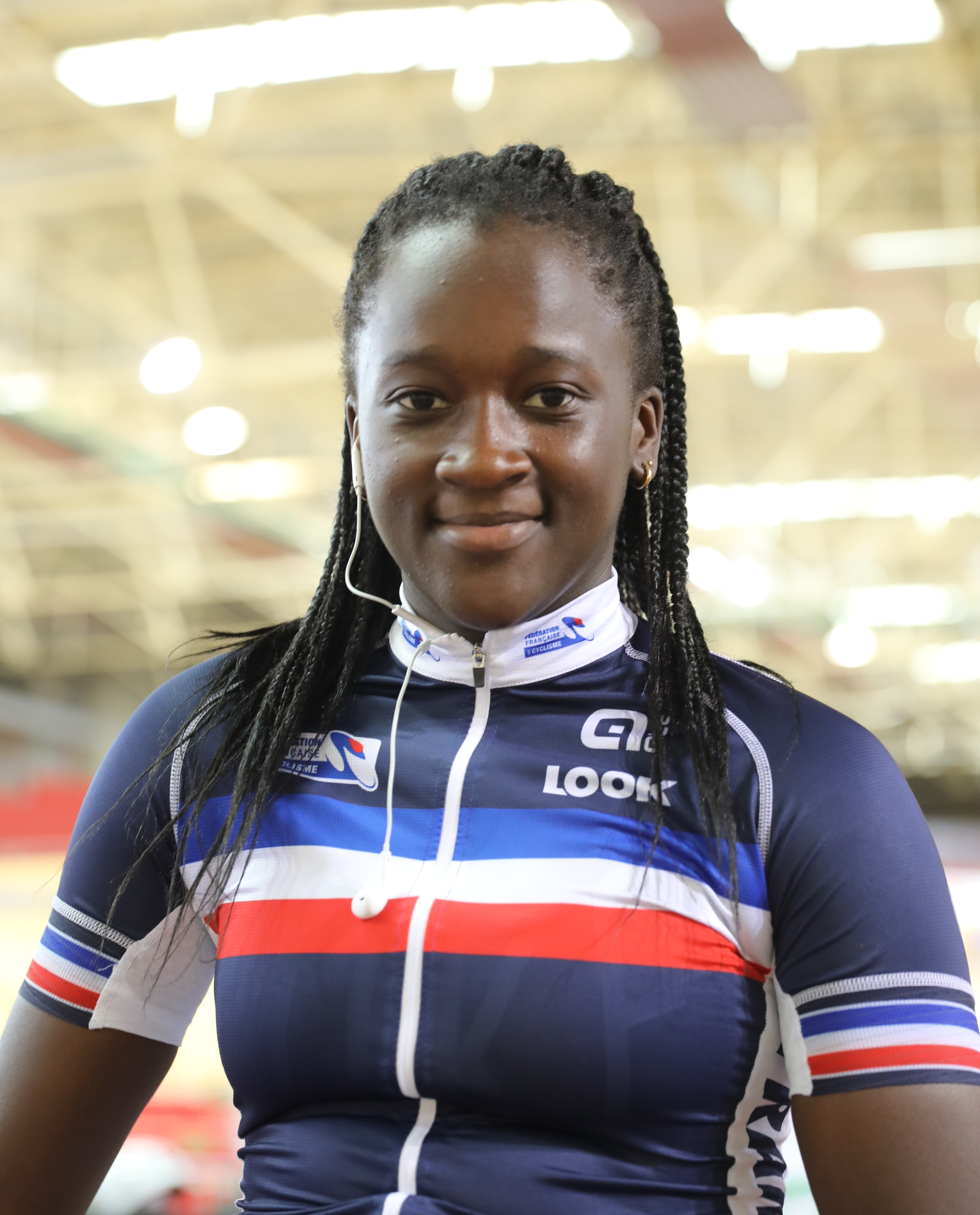
- Marie-Divine Kouamé in 2019

Personal information
- Born: 30 July 2002 (age 24) Creteil, France

Cycling career
- Sport: Cycling
- Discipline: Track
- Role: Rider
Medal record
Women's track cycling
Representing France
World Championships
Gold medal – first place	2022 Saint-Quentin-en-Yvelines	500 m time trial
European Championships
Silver medal – second place	2023 Grenchen	500 m time trial
Silver medal – second place	2024 Apeldoorn	500 m time trial

Taky Marie-Divine Kouamé (born 30 July 2002) is a French track cyclist. She competed at the 2022 UCI Track Cycling World Championships, winning the gold medal in the women's 500m time trial event with an average speed of 54.820 km/h.

In July 2022, at the UEC European U23 Track Championships, she won three medals, including the title in the 500-meter time trial, beating the French record in 33.860 (compared to 33.872 set by Sandie Clair in 2008).
