= Alessia McCaig =

Australian cyclist (born 2003)

Personal information
- Born: 24 April 2003 (age 23) Bendigo, Victoria, Australia

Cycling career
- Sport: Cycling
- Discipline: Track
- Role: Rider
- Rider type: Track sprinting
Medal record
Women's track cycling
Representing Australia
World Championships
Bronze medal – third place	2024 Ballerup	Team sprint
Bronze medal – third place	2025 Santiago	Team sprint

Alessia McCaig (born 24 April 2003) is an Australian professional racing cyclist who specializes in track cycling.

== Career ==
McCaig began cycling at the age of nine, joining the Bendigo and District Cycling Club on a second-hand bike from her older brother.

In December 2020, she dominated the Australian Junior Track Championships (17/18 years) with three titles: the 500 metres, the keirin and the sprint. In 2022, McCaig represented her country at the 2022 Commonwealth Games, where she placed fourth in the team sprint and eighth in the 500 metres. In 2023, she was Australian champion in the 500 metres and keirin, as well as the Oceania Team Sprint Championships.

In February 2024, McCaig won four medals, including the team sprint title, at the Oceania Championships. The following month, she completed the 500 metres, keirin and sprint treble at the national championships. In October of the same year, she won a bronze medal in the team sprint at the Track World Championships.
