= Mina Sato =

Japanese track cyclist (born 1998)

Personal information
- Born: 7 December 1998 (age 27) Chigasaki, Japan

Cycling career
- Sport: Cycling
- Discipline: Track
- Role: Rider
Medal record
Women's track cycling
Representing Japan
World Championships
Gold medal – first place	2024 Ballerup	Keirin
Gold medal – first place	2025 Santiago	Keirin
Silver medal – second place	2021 Roubaix	Keirin
Silver medal – second place	2022 Saint-Quentin-en-Yvelines	Keirin
Silver medal – second place	2025 Santiago	Sprint
Bronze medal – third place	2024 Ballerup	Sprint
Bronze medal – third place	2026 Shanghai	Sprint
Asian Games
Gold medal – first place	2022 Hangzhou	Sprint
Gold medal – first place	2022 Hangzhou	Keirin
Silver medal – second place	2026 Aichi–Nagoya	Sprint
Asian Championships
Gold medal – first place	2022 New Delhi	Keirin
Gold medal – first place	2023 Nilai	Keirin
Gold medal – first place	2025 Nilai	Sprint
Silver medal – second place	2022 New Delhi	Team sprint
Silver medal – second place	2023 Nilai	Sprint
Silver medal – second place	2023 Nilai	Team sprint
Silver medal – second place	2026 Tagaytay	Sprint
Bronze medal – third place	2025 Nilai	Team sprint

Mina Sato (born 7 December 1998) is a Japanese track cyclist.

She won a medal at the 2021 UCI Track Cycling World Championships.
