= Sarah Orban =

Canadian cyclist (born 1995)

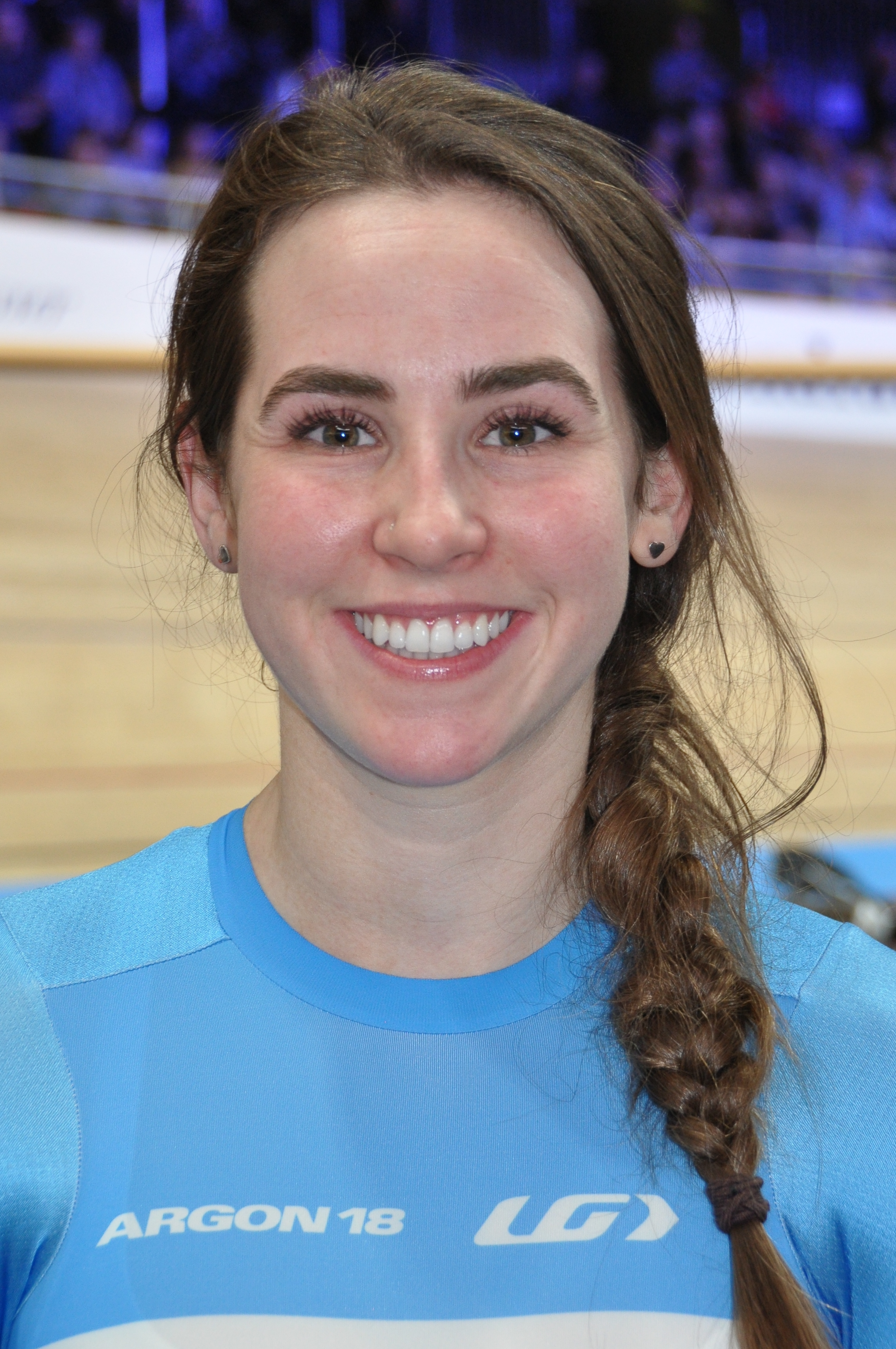
- Sarah Orban (2020)

Personal information
- Born: 22 October 1995 (age 30) Calgary, Alberta

Cycling career
- Sport: Cycling
- Role: Rider
Medal record
Women's track cycling
Representing Canada
Commonwealth Games
Silver medal – second place	2022 Birmingham	Team sprint
Pan American Games
Bronze medal – third place	2023 Santiago	Team sprint
Pan American Championships
Gold medal – first place	2022 Lima	Team sprint
Silver medal – second place	2023 San Juan	Team sprint
Silver medal – second place	2024 Carson	Team sprint

Sarah Orban (born 22 October 1995) is an Olympian and Canadian professional racing cyclist. She rode in the women's sprint event at the 2020 UCI Track Cycling World Championships in Berlin, Germany.

She qualified to represent Canada at the 2024 Summer Olympics.
