= Nurul Izzah Izzati Mohd Asri =

Malaysian cyclist (born 2003)

Izzati Asri
Personal information
- Full name: Nurul Izzah Izzati binti Mohd Asri
- Born: 11 September 2003 (age 23)

Cycling career
- Sport: Cycling
- Discipline: Track
- Role: Rider
- Rider type: Sprinter
Medal record
Representing Malaysia
Event	1st	2nd	3rd
Asian Games	0	1	2
Asian Championships	5	5	3
Total	5	6	5
Women's track cycling
Asian Games
Silver medal – second place	2026 Aichi–Nagoya	Team sprint
Bronze medal – third place	2022 Hangzhou	Team sprint
Bronze medal – third place	2026 Aichi–Nagoya	Keirin
Asian Championships
Gold medal – first place	2022 New Delhi	500 m trial
Gold medal – first place	2024 New Delhi	500 m trial
Gold medal – first place	2024 New Delhi	Keirin
Gold medal – first place	2025 Nilai	Keirin
Gold medal – first place	2025 Nilai	1 кm time trial
Silver medal – second place	2023 Nilai	500 m trial
Silver medal – second place	2023 Nilai	Team sprint
Silver medal – second place	2025 Nilai	Team sprint
Silver medal – second place	2026 Tagaytay	1 кm time trial
Silver medal – second place	2026 Tagaytay	Team sprint
Bronze medal – third place	2022 New Delhi	Keirin
Bronze medal – third place	2024 New Delhi	Sprint
Bronze medal – third place	2025 Nilai	Sprint

Nurul Izzah Izzati binti Mohd Asri (born 11 September 2003) is a Malaysian professional Track cyclist.

== Career ==
Nurul Izzah Izzati Mohd Asri began cycling seriously at the age of 12, joining the Kedah Sports Council state team. A year later, at just 13, she won a bronze medal in the MTB XCO event at the Malaysia SUKMA Games, competing against athletes aged 15 to 21. In 2016, after the Malaysian National Sports Council (MSN) introduced the Junior Cycling Malaysia Track and Road program, the Kedah state team participated in almost all series. During this period, Izzah began to show promising results, particularly in the 500m event. By 2018, her talent was shining through. She won gold in MTB XCO, silver in the 500m event where she narrowly lost to her current national teammate Anis Amira Rosidi by 1.0999 seconds—and bronze in the keirin at the Malaysia SUKMA Games. In 2022, Izzah joined] the elite national track cycling team under the supervision of coach John Beasley.

At the age of 19, Nurul Izzah Izzati Mohd Asri, secured the title of Asian 500m Champion and won the bronze medal in the keirin event at the 2022 Asian Track Cycling Championships, in New Delhi. In the same year, she competed at the 2022 Asian Games held in Hangzhou, where she secured a bronze medal in the team sprint event alongside Nurul Aliana Syafika Azizan and Anis Amira Rosidi. In 2023, She won two silver medals in the category 500m and team Sprint event at the 2023 Asian Track Cycling Championships.

She won four medals at the 2024 Asian Track Cycling Championships, including gold in the 500-meter event and keirin. At the 2024 Track Cycling National Cup round in Milton, Canada, she finished eighth in the keirin and advanced to the second round of the speed championships. This allows her to qualify for the 2024 Paris Olympics. Local journalists later gave her the nickname "Pocket Rocketwoman" in reference to her compatriot Azizulhasni Awang.

She made her Olympic debut and participated in both Sprint and Keirin cycling events during the 2024 Summer Olympics in Paris. She is the second Malaysian woman to compete in Track cycling at the Olympics, after Fatehah Mustapa, who participated in the 2012 and 2016 Olympics. She didn't make it into quarterfinals of keirin event after finished third in the repechage round. She missed out the spot in 1/16 after finished second in 1/32 finals round.
