= World record progression track cycling – Women's team sprint =

This is an overview of the progression of the world track cycling record of the women's 500 m team sprint as recognised by the Union Cycliste Internationale.

== 500m Progression ==
Time	Cyclist	Location	Track	Date	Meet
33.149	Australia; Kaarle McCulloch; Anna Meares	Pruszków (POL)	Indoor track	26 March 2009	World Championships
32.923	Australia; Kaarle McCulloch; Anna Meares	Copenhagen (DEN)	Indoor track	25 March 2010	World Championships
32.754	Great Britain; Jessica Varnish; Victoria Pendleton	London (GBR)	Indoor track	17 February 2012	World Cup
32.549	Germany; Miriam Welte; Kristina Vogel	Melbourne (AUS)	Indoor track	4 April 2012	World Championships
32.422	China; Gong Jinjie; Guo Shuang	London (GBR)	Indoor track	2 August 2012	Olympic Games
32.153	Germany; Kristina Vogel; Miriam Welte	Aguascalientes (MEX)	Indoor track	5 December 2013	World Cup
32.034	China; Gong Jinjie; Zhong Tianshi	Saint-Quentin-en-Yvelines (FRA)	Indoor track	18 February 2015	World Championships
31.928^{[P]}	China; Gong Jinjie; Zhong Tianshi	Rio de Janeiro (BRA)	Indoor track	12 August 2016	Olympic Games
31.804	China; Bao Shanju; Zhong Tianshi	Shizuoka (JPN)	Indoor track	2 August 2021	Olympic Games

- ^{^{P}} Record yet to be ratified

== 750m Progression ==
Time	Cyclist	Location	Track	Date	Meet	Ref
46.852	Russia; Anastasia Voynova; Daria Shmeleva; Natalia Antonova	Plovdiv (BUL)	Indoor track	11 November 2020	European Championships	
46.759	Netherlands; Shanne Braspennincx; Kyra Lamberink; Steffie van der Peet	Grenchen (SUI)	Indoor track	5 October 2021	European Championships	
46.551	Netherlands; Shanne Braspennincx; Kyra Lamberink; Hetty van de Wouw	Grenchen (SUI)	Indoor track	5 October 2021	European Championships	
46.511	Germany; Pauline Grabosch; Lea Friedrich; Emma Hinze	Roubaix (FRA)	Indoor track	20 October 2021	World Championships	
46.358	Germany; Pauline Grabosch; Lea Friedrich; Emma Hinze	Roubaix (FRA)	Indoor track	20 October 2021	World Championships	
46.064	Germany; Pauline Grabosch; Lea Friedrich; Emma Hinze	Roubaix (FRA)	Indoor track	20 October 2021	World Championships	
45.983	Germany; Lea Friedrich; Pauline Grabosch; Emma Hinze	Saint-Quentin-en-Yvelines (FRA)	Indoor track	12 October 2022	World Championships	
45.967	Germany; Lea Friedrich; Pauline Grabosch; Emma Hinze	Saint-Quentin-en-Yvelines (FRA)	Indoor track	12 October 2022	World Championships	
45.848	Germany; Lea Friedrich; Pauline Grabosch; Emma Hinze	Glasgow (GBR)	Indoor track	3 August 2023	World Championships	
45.487	China; Guo Yufang; Bao Shanju; Yuan Liying	Luoyang (CHN)	Indoor track	26 June 2024	Chinese Track League	
45.472	Great Britain; Katy Marchant; Sophie Capewell; Emma Finucane	Saint-Quentin-en-Yvelines (FRA)	Indoor track	5 August 2024	Olympics Games	
45.377	Germany; Emma Hinze; Lea Friedrich; Pauline Grabosch	Saint-Quentin-en-Yvelines (FRA)	Indoor track	5 August 2024	Olympics Games	
45.348	New Zealand; Ellesse Andrews; Shaane Fulton; Rebecca Petch	Saint-Quentin-en-Yvelines (FRA)	Indoor track	5 August 2024	Olympics Games	
45.338	Great Britain; Katy Marchant; Emma Finucane; Sophie Capewell	Saint-Quentin-en-Yvelines (FRA)	Indoor track	5 August 2024	Olympics Games	
45.186	Great Britain; Katy Marchant; Emma Finucane; Sophie Capewell	Saint-Quentin-en-Yvelines (FRA)	Indoor track	5 August 2024	Olympics Games	
