= 2019 UCI Track Cycling World Championships – Women's team sprint =

Women's team sprint at the 2019 UCI Track Cycling World Championships
- Venue: BGŻ Arena
- Location: Pruszków, Poland
- Dates: 27 February
- Competitors: 36 from 17 nations
- Teams: 17
- Winning time: 32.255

Medalists
gold medal	Kaarle McCulloch; Stephanie Morton	Australia
silver medal	Daria Shmeleva; Anastasia Voynova	Russia
bronze medal	Miriam Welte; Emma Hinze	Germany

The Women's team sprint competition at the 2019 UCI Track Cycling World Championships was held on 27 February 2019.

== Results ==
=== Qualifying ===
The qualifying was started at 18:00. The fastest eight teams qualified for the first round.

Rank	Nation	Time	Behind	Notes
1	Australia; Kaarle McCulloch; Stephanie Morton	32.492		Q
2	Russia; Daria Shmeleva; Anastasia Voynova	32.590	+0.098	Q
3	Germany; Miriam Welte; Emma Hinze	32.802	+0.310	Q
4	Lithuania; Miglė Marozaitė; Simona Krupeckaitė	33.278	+0.786	Q
5	Mexico; Jessica Salazar; Yuli Verdugo	33.281	+0.789	Q
6	Netherlands; Kyra Lamberink; Laurine van Riessen	33.365	+0.873	Q
7	France; Sandie Clair; Mathilde Gros	33.398	+0.906	Q
8	China; Lin Junhong; Guo Yufang	33.765	+1.273	Q
9	Spain; Tania Calvo; Helena Casas	33.802	+1.310	
10	Poland; Marlena Karwacka; Urszula Łoś	33.924	+1.432	
11	South Korea; Kim Tae-nam; Lee Hye-jin	33.946	+1.454	
12	Ukraine; Olena Starikova; Lyubov Basova	34.238	+1.746	
13	United States; Madalyn Godby; Mandy Marquardt	34.311	+1.819	
14	Great Britain; Katy Marchant; Victoria Williamson	34.396	+1.904	
15	New Zealand; Olivia Podmore; Ellesse Andrews	34.436	+1.944	
16	Italy; Martina Fidanza; Miriam Vece	34.449	+1.957	
17	Hong Kong; Jessica Lee; Lee Wai Sze	34.779	+2.287	

=== First round ===
The first round was started at 19:55.

First round heats were held as follows:
Heat 1: 4th v 5th fastest
Heat 2: 3rd v 6th fastest
Heat 3: 2nd v 7th fastest
Heat 4: 1st v 8th fastest

The heat winners were ranked on time, from which the top 2 proceeded to the gold medal final and the other 2 proceeded to the bronze medal final.

Rank	Overall rank	Nation	Time	Behind	Notes
4 vs 5
1	5	Mexico; Jessica Salazar; Yuli Verdugo	33.225		QB
2	7	Lithuania; Miglė Marozaitė; Simona Krupeckaitė	33.478	+0.263	
3 vs 6
1	3	Germany; Miriam Welte; Emma Hinze	32.687		QB
2	4	Netherlands; Kyra Lamberink; Shanne Braspennincx	32.941	+0.254	
2 vs 7
1	2	Russia; Daria Shmeleva; Anastasia Voynova	32.524		QG
2	6	France; Sandie Clair; Mathilde Gros	33.383	+0.859	
1 vs 8
1	1	Australia; Kaarle McCulloch; Stephanie Morton	32.368		QG
2	8	China; Lin Junhong; Chen Feifei	33.969	+1.601	

- QG = qualified for gold medal final
- QB = qualified for bronze medal final

=== Finals ===
The finals were started at 20:53.

Rank	Nation	Time	Behind	Notes
Gold medal race
1st place, gold medalist(s)	Australia; Kaarle McCulloch; Stephanie Morton	32.255		
2nd place, silver medalist(s)	Russia; Daria Shmeleva; Anastasia Voynova	32.591	+0.336	
Bronze medal race
3rd place, bronze medalist(s)	Germany; Miriam Welte; Emma Hinze	32.789		
4	Mexico; Jessica Salazar; Yuli Verdugo	33.455	+0.766	
