= 2021 UEC European Track Championships – Women's keirin =

Women's keirin at the 2021 UEC European Track Championships
- Venue: Tissot Velodrome, Grenchen
- Date: 9 October
- Competitors: 17 from 11 nations

Medalists
gold medal	Lea Friedrich	Germany
silver medal	Olena Starikova	Ukraine
bronze medal	Yana Tyshchenko	Russia

The women's keirin competition at the 2021 UEC European Track Championships was held on 9 October 2021.

== Results ==
=== First round ===
The first two riders in each heat qualified to the second round, all other riders advanced to the first round repechages.

Heat 1

Rank	Name	Nation	Notes
1	Mathilde Gros	France	Q
2	Sophie Capewell	Great Britain	Q
3	Urszula Łoś	Poland	
4	Veronika Jaborníková	Czech Republic	
5	Oleksandra Lohviniuk	Ukraine	

Heat 2

Rank	Name	Nation	Notes
1	Lea Friedrich	Germany	Q
2	Nicky Degrendele	Belgium	Q
3	Daria Shmeleva	Russia	
4	Hetty van de Wouw	Netherlands	
5	Helena Casas	Spain	
6	Marlena Karwacka	Poland	

Heat 3

Rank	Name	Nation	Notes
1	Shanne Braspennincx	Netherlands	Q
2	Yana Tyshchenko	Russia	Q
3	Alessa-Catriona Pröpster	Germany	
4	Olena Starikova	Ukraine	
5	Lauren Bate	Great Britain	
6	Elena Bissolati	Italy	

=== First round repechage ===
The first three riders in each heat qualify to the second round.

Heat 1

Rank	Name	Nation	Notes
1	Hetty van de Wouw	Netherlands	Q
2	Helena Casas	Spain	Q
3	Olena Starikova	Ukraine	Q
4	Urszula Łoś	Poland	
5	Elena Bissolati	Italy	

Heat 2

Rank	Name	Nation	Notes
1	Alessa-Catriona Pröpster	Germany	Q
2	Daria Shmeleva	Russia	Q
3	Marlena Karwacka	Poland	Q
4	Veronika Jaborníková	Czech Republic	
5	Oleksandra Lohviniuk	Ukraine	
6	Lauren Bate	Great Britain	

=== Second round ===
The first three riders in each heat qualified to final 1–6, all other riders advanced to final 7–12.

Heat 1

Rank	Name	Nation	Notes
1	Nicky Degrendele	Belgium	Q
1	Yana Tyshchenko	Russia	Q
1	Olena Starikova	Ukraine	Q
4	Mathilde Gros	France	DNF
4	Alessa-Catriona Pröpster	Germany	DNF
4	Marlena Karwacka	Poland	DNF

Heat 2

Rank	Name	Nation	Notes
1	Lea Friedrich	Germany	Q
2	Sophie Capewell	Great Britain	Q
3	Helena Casas	Spain	Q
4	Shanne Braspennincx	Netherlands	
5	Daria Shmeleva	Russia	
6	Hetty van de Wouw	Netherlands	

=== Finals ===
Small final

Rank	Name	Nation	Notes
7	Shanne Braspennincx	Netherlands	
8	Hetty van de Wouw	Netherlands	
9	Daria Shmeleva	Russia	
10	Marlena Karwacka	Poland	
11	Mathilde Gros	France	
12	Alessa-Catriona Pröpster	Germany	

Final

Rank	Name	Nation	Notes
1st place, gold medalist(s)	Lea Friedrich	Germany	
2nd place, silver medalist(s)	Olena Starikova	Ukraine	
3rd place, bronze medalist(s)	Yana Tyshchenko	Russia	
4	Sophie Capewell	Great Britain	
5	Nicky Degrendele	Belgium	
6	Helena Casas	Spain	
