= 2018 UEC European Track Championships – Women's 500 m time trial =

Women's 500 m time trial at the 2018 UEC European Track Championships
- Venue: Sir Chris Hoy Velodrome, Glasgow
- Date: 6 August
- Competitors: 15 from 10 nations
- Winning time: 33.285

Medalists
gold medal	Daria Shmeleva	Russia
silver medal	Olena Starikova	Ukraine
bronze medal	Miriam Welte	Germany

The women's 500 m time trial competition at the 2018 UEC European Track Championships was held on 6 August 2018.

== Results ==
=== Qualifying ===
The top 8 riders qualified for the final.

Rank	Name	Nation	Time	Behind	Notes
1	Daria Shmeleva	Russia	33.309		Q
2	Olena Starikova	Ukraine	33.575	+0.266	Q
3	Kyra Lamberink	Netherlands	33.786	+0.477	Q
4	Urszula Łoś	Poland	33.826	+0.517	Q
5	Miriam Welte	Germany	34.155	+0.846	Q
6	Miriam Vece	Italy	34.318	+1.009	Q
7	Hetty van de Wouw	Netherlands	34.352	+1.043	Q
8	Tania Calvo	Spain	34.499	+1.190	Q
9	Lauren Bate-Lowe	Great Britain	34.739	+1.430	
10	Ekaterina Gnidenko	Russia	34.940	+1.631	
11	Marlena Karwacka	Poland	35.030	+1.721	
12	Sophie Capewell	Great Britain	35.044	+1.735	
13	Helena Casas	Spain	35.210	+1.901	
14	Sára Kaňkovská	Czech Republic	35.793	+2.484	
15	Orla Walsh	Ireland	36.478	+3.169	

=== Final ===
Rank	Name	Nation	Time	Behind	Notes
1st place, gold medalist(s)	Daria Shmeleva	Russia	33.285		
2nd place, silver medalist(s)	Olena Starikova	Ukraine	33.593	+0.308	
3rd place, bronze medalist(s)	Miriam Welte	Germany	33.600	+0.315	
4	Kyra Lamberink	Netherlands	33.939	+0.654	
5	Urszula Łoś	Poland	33.940	+0.655	
6	Miriam Vece	Italy	34.329	+1.044	
7	Hetty van de Wouw	Netherlands	34.479	+1.194	
8	Tania Calvo	Spain	34.555	+1.270	
