= 2024 UEC European Track Championships – Women's team sprint =

Women's team sprint at the 2024 UEC European Track Championships
- Venue: Omnisport Apeldoorn, Apeldoorn
- Date: 10 January
- Competitors: 25 from 8 nations
- Winning time: 45.899

Medalists
| gold medal | Lea Friedrich; Pauline Grabosch; Emma Hinze | Germany |
| silver medal | Sophie Capewell; Emma Finucane; Katy Marchant; Lowri Thomas | Great Britain |
| bronze medal | Kyra Lamberink; Hetty van de Wouw; Steffie van der Peet | Netherlands |

The women's team sprint competition at the 2024 UEC European Track Championships was held on 10 January 2024.

== Results ==
=== Qualifying ===
All teams advanced to the first round.

| Rank | Nation | Time | Behind | Notes |
|---|---|---|---|---|
| 1 | Germany; Lea Friedrich; Pauline Grabosch; Emma Hinze | 46.316 | | Q |
| 2 | Great Britain; Sophie Capewell; Emma Finucane; Lowri Thomas | 46.377 | +0.061 | Q |
| 3 | Netherlands; Kyra Lamberink; Hetty van de Wouw; Steffie van der Peet | 47.173 | +0.857 | Q |
| 4 | Poland; Marlena Karwacka; Urszula Łoś; Nikola Sibiak | 47.481 | +1.165 | Q |
| 5 | France; Mathilde Gros; Taky Marie-Divine Kouamé; Julie Michaux | 48.171 | +1.855 | Q |
| 6 | Belgium; Valerie Jenaer; Julie Nicolaes; Nicky Degrendele | 49.114 | +2.798 | Q |
| 7 | Ukraine; Alla Biletska; Oleksandra Lohviniuk; Olena Starikova | 49.282 | +2.966 | Q |
| 8 | Czech Republic; Natálie Mikšaníková; Veronika Jaborníková; Anna Jaborníková | 49.718 | +3.402 | Q |

=== First round ===
First round heats were held as follows:
Heat 1: 4th v 5th fastest
Heat 2: 3rd v 6th fastest
Heat 3: 2nd v 7th fastest
Heat 4: 1st v 8th fastest

The heat winners were ranked on time, from which the top 2 proceeded to the gold medal final and the other 2 proceeded to the bronze medal final.

| Heat | Rank | Nation | Time | Behind | Notes |
|---|---|---|---|---|---|
| 1 | 1 | Poland; Marlena Karwacka; Urszula Łoś; Nikola Sibiak | 47.389 | | QB |
| 1 | 2 | France; Mathilde Gros; Taky Marie-Divine Kouamé; Julie Michaux | 48.270 | +0.881 | |
| 2 | 1 | Netherlands; Kyra Lamberink; Steffie van der Peet; Hetty van de Wouw | 46.866 | | QB |
| 2 | 2 | Belgium; Nicky Degrendele; Valerie Jenaer; Julie Nicolaes | 55.686 | +8.820 | |
| 3 | 1 | Great Britain; Sophie Capewell; Emma Finucane; Katy Marchant | 46.432 | | QG |
| 3 | 2 | Ukraine; Alla Biletska; Oleksandra Lohviniuk; Olena Starikova | 49.408 | +2.976 | |
| 4 | 1 | Germany; Lea Friedrich; Pauline Grabosch; Emma Hinze | 46.234 | | QG |
| 4 | 2 | Czech Republic; Anna Jaborníková; Veronika Jaborníková; Natálie Mikšaníková | 49.676 | +3.442 | |

=== Finals ===
| Rank | Nation | Time | Behind | Notes |
|---|---|---|---|---|
Gold medal final
| 1st place, gold medalist(s) | Germany; Lea Friedrich; Pauline Grabosch; Emma Hinze | 45.899 | | |
| 2nd place, silver medalist(s) | Great Britain; Sophie Capewell; Emma Finucane; Katy Marchant | 46.151 | +0.252 | |
Bronze medal final
| 3rd place, bronze medalist(s) | Netherlands; Kyra Lamberink; Hetty van de Wouw; Steffie van der Peet | 46.754 | | |
| 4 | Poland; Marlena Karwacka; Urszula Łoś; Nikola Sibiak | 47.189 | +0.435 | |
