= Cycling at the 2019 European Games – Women's team sprint =

Women's team sprint at the 2019 European Games
- Venue: Minsk Velodrome
- Date: 27 June
- Competitors: 18 from 8 nations
- Winning time: 32.317

Medalists
gold medal	Daria Shmeleva; Anastasia Voynova; Ekaterina Rogovaia	Russia
silver medal	Simona Krupeckaitė; Miglė Marozaitė	Lithuania
bronze medal	Kyra Lamberink; Shanne Braspennincx; Hetty van de Wouw	Netherlands

The women's cycling team sprint at the 2019 European Games was held at the Minsk Velodrome on 27 June 2019.

== Results ==
=== Qualifying ===
Rank	Name	Nation	Time	Behind	Notes
1	Ekaterina Rogovaia; Anastasia Voynova	Russia	33.196		
2	Marlena Karwacka; Urszula Łoś	Poland	33.645	+0.449	
3	Olena Starikova; Lyubov Basova	Ukraine	33.805	+0.609	
4	Kyra Lamberink; Hetty van de Wouw	Netherlands	33.852	+0.656	
5	Sandie Clair; Mathilde Gros	France	33.895	+0.699	
6	Simona Krupeckaitė; Miglė Marozaitė	Lithuania	34.091	+0.895	
7	Tania Calvo; Helena Casas	Spain	34.254	+1.058	
8	Martina Fidanza; Miriam Vece	Italy	35.041	+1.845	

=== First round ===
First round heats were held as follows:
Heat 1: 4th v 5th fastest
Heat 2: 3rd v 6th fastest
Heat 3: 2nd v 7th fastest
Heat 4: 1st v 8th fastest

The heat winners were ranked on time, from which the top 2 proceeded to the gold medal final and the other 2 proceeded to the bronze medal final.

Rank	Overall rank	Name	Nation	Time	Behind	Notes
1 vs 8
1	1	Daria Shmeleva; Anastasia Voynova	Russia	32.367		QG
2	8	Martina Fidanza; Miriam Vece	Italy	34.805	+2.438	
2 vs 7
1	3	Marlena Karwacka; Urszula Łoś	Poland	33.409		QB
2	7	Tania Calvo; Helena Casas	Spain	34.294	+0.885	
3 vs 6
1	2	Simona Krupeckaitė; Miglė Marozaitė	Lithuania	33.083		QG
2	6	Olena Starikova; Lyubov Basova	Ukraine	33.776	+0.693	
4 vs 5
1	4	Kyra Lamberink; Shanne Braspennincx	Netherlands	33.460		QB
2	5	Sandie Clair; Mathilde Gros	France	33.648	+0.188	

=== Finals ===
Rank	Name	Nation	Time	Behind	Notes
Gold medal final
1st place, gold medalist(s)	Daria Shmeleva; Anastasia Voynova	Russia	32.317		
2nd place, silver medalist(s)	Simona Krupeckaitė; Miglė Marozaitė	Lithuania	33.225	+0.908	
Bronze medal final
3rd place, bronze medalist(s)	Kyra Lamberink; Shanne Braspennincx	Netherlands	33.317		
4	Marlena Karwacka; Urszula Łoś	Poland	33.393	+0.076	
