= 2018 UCI Track Cycling World Championships – Women's 500 m time trial =

Women's 500 m time trial at the 2018 UCI Track Cycling World Championships
- Venue: Omnisport Apeldoorn
- Location: Apeldoorn, Netherlands
- Dates: 3 March
- Competitors: 22 from 15 nations
- Winning time: 33.150

Medalists
gold medal	Miriam Welte	Germany
silver medal	Daria Shmeleva	Russia
bronze medal	Elis Ligtlee	Netherlands

The women's 500 m time trial competition at the 2018 UCI Track Cycling World Championships was held on 3 March 2018 at the Omnisport Apeldoorn in Apeldoorn, Netherlands.

== Results ==
=== Qualifying ===
The top 8 riders qualified for the final.

Rank	Name	Nation	Time	Behind	Notes
1	Daria Shmeleva	Russia	33.239		Q
2	Miriam Welte	Germany	33.416	+0.177	Q
3	Pauline Grabosch	Germany	33.523	+0.264	Q
4	Elis Ligtlee	Netherlands	33.557	+0.318	Q
5	Olena Starikova	Ukraine	33.613	+0.374	Q
6	Kyra Lamberink	Netherlands	33.888	+0.649	Q
7	Katy Marchant	Great Britain	33.893	+0.654	Q
8	Tania Calvo	Spain	33.924	+0.685	Q
9	Lee Wai Sze	Hong Kong	34.001	+0.762	
10	Lyubov Shulika	Ukraine	34.082	+0.843	
11	Martha Bayona	Colombia	34.266	+1.027	
12	Jessica Salazar	Mexico	34.405	+1.166	
13	Helena Casas	Spain	34.535	+1.296	
14	Yuli Verdugo	Mexico	34.781	+1.542	
15	Miriam Vece	Italy	34.888	+1.649	
16	Kim Wong-yeong	South Korea	35.102	+1.863	
17	Mandy Marquardt	United States	35.148	+1.909	
18	Jessica Hoi Yan	Hong Kong	35.220	+1.981	
19	Song Chaorui	China	35.333	+2.094	
20	Deborah Herold	India	35.706	+2.467	
21	Ma Wing Yu	Hong Kong	36.597	+3.358	
–	Stephanie Morton	Australia	DNS		

=== Final ===
The final was held at 18:30.

Rank	Name	Nation	Time	Behind	Notes
1st place, gold medalist(s)	Miriam Welte	Germany	33.150		
2nd place, silver medalist(s)	Daria Shmeleva	Russia	33.237	+0.087	
3rd place, bronze medalist(s)	Elis Ligtlee	Netherlands	33.484	+0.334	
4	Pauline Grabosch	Germany	33.487	+0.337	
5	Olena Starikova	Ukraine	33.609	+0.459	
6	Tania Calvo	Spain	33.996	+0.846	
7	Kyra Lamberink	Netherlands	34.179	34.179	
8	Katy Marchant	Great Britain	34.242	34.242	
