= 2023 UEC European Track Championships – Women's 500 m time trial =

Women's 500 m time trial at the 2023 UEC European Track Championships
- Venue: Tissot Velodrome, Grenchen
- Date: 11 February
- Competitors: 21 from 12 nations
- Winning time: 32.947

Medalists
gold medal	Emma Hinze	Germany
silver medal	Taky Marie-Divine Kouamé	France
bronze medal	Hetty van de Wouw	Netherlands

The women's 500 m time trial competition at the 2023 UEC European Track Championships was held on 11 February 2023.

== Results ==
=== Qualifying ===
The top 8 riders qualified for the final.

Rank	Name	Nation	Time	Behind	Notes
1	Emma Hinze	Germany	33.115		Q
2	Miriam Vece	Italy	33.367	+0.252	Q
3	Taky Marie-Divine Kouamé	France	33.388	+0.273	Q
4	Hetty van de Wouw	Netherlands	33.574	+0.459	Q
5	Pauline Grabosch	Germany	33.682	+0.567	Q
6	Lauren Bell	Great Britain	33.859	+0.744	Q
7	Kyra Lamberink	Netherlands	33.867	+0.752	Q
8	Katy Marchant	Great Britain	33.934	+0.819	Q
9	Veronika Jaborníková	Czech Republic	33.955	+0.840	
10	Paulina Petri	Poland	34.141	+1.026	
11	Nikola Sibiak	Poland	34.191	+1.076	
12	Miglė Lendel	Lithuania	34.281	+1.166	
13	Valerie Jenaer	Belgium	34.423	+1.308	
14	Julie Michaux	France	34.549	+1.434	
15	Alla Biletska	Ukraine	34.835	+1.720	
16	Oleksandra Lohviniuk	Ukraine	34.973	+1.858	
17	Orla Walsh	Ireland	35.032	+1.917	
18	Helena Casas	Spain	35.077	+1.962	
19	Julie Nicolaes	Belgium	35.108	+1.993	
20	Giada Capobianchi	Italy	35.346	+2.231	
21	Natálie Mikšaníková	Czech Republic	36.007	+2.892	

=== Final ===
Rank	Name	Nation	Time	Behind	Notes
1st place, gold medalist(s)	Emma Hinze	Germany	32.947		
2nd place, silver medalist(s)	Taky Marie-Divine Kouamé	France	33.390	+0.443	
3rd place, bronze medalist(s)	Hetty van de Wouw	Netherlands	33.554	+0.607	
4	Miriam Vece	Italy	33.587	+0.640	
5	Pauline Grabosch	Germany	33.708	+0.761	
6	Lauren Bell	Great Britain	33.710	+0.763	
7	Kyra Lamberink	Netherlands	34.200	+1.253	
8	Katy Marchant	Great Britain	34.297	+1.350	
