= 2025 UCI Track Cycling World Championships – Women's 1 km time trial =

Women's 1 km time trial at the 2025 UCI Track Cycling World Championships
- Venue: Velódromo Peñalolén
- Location: Santiago, Chile
- Dates: 25 October
- Competitors: 25 from 18 nations
- Winning time: 1:03.121

Medalists
gold medal	Hetty van de Wouw	Netherlands
silver medal	Yana Burlakova	Individual Neutral Athletes
bronze medal	Ellesse Andrews	New Zealand

The Women's 1 km time trial competition at the 2025 UCI Track Cycling World Championships was held on 25 October 2025.

== Results ==
=== Qualifying ===
The qualifying was started at 11:00. The top eight riders qualified for the final.

Rank	Name	Nation	Time	Behind	Notes
1	Hetty van de Wouw	Netherlands	1:03.652		Q, WR
2	Lea Friedrich	Germany	1:04.474	+0.822	Q
3	Ellesse Andrews	New Zealand	1:04.523	+0.871	Q
4	Pauline Grabosch	Germany	1:05.083	+1.431	Q
5	Yana Burlakova	Individual Neutral Athletes	1:05.411	+1.759	Q
6	Martina Fidanza	Italy	1:05.673	+2.021	Q
7	Stefany Cuadrado	Colombia	1:05.842	+2.190	Q
8	Rhian Edmunds	Great Britain	1:06.110	+2.458	Q
9	Ekaterina Evlanova	Individual Neutral Athletes	1:06.199	+2.547	
10	Megan Barker	Great Britain	1:06.590	+2.938	
11	Claudia Marcks	Australia	1:07.063	+3.411	
12	Daniela Gaxiola	Mexico	1:07.254	+3.602	
13	Yuli Verdugo	Mexico	1:07.460	+3.808	
14	Hayley Yoslov	United States	1:07.639	+3.987	
15	Marith Vanhove	Belgium	1:07.660	+4.008	
16	Nikola Sibiak	Poland	1:07.930	+4.278	
17	Juliana Gaviria	Colombia	1:08.386	+4.734	
18	Anna Jaborníková	Czech Republic	1:08.598	+4.946	
19	Paola Muñoz	Chile	1:08.844	+5.192	
20	Urszula Łoś	Poland	1:09.249	+5.597	
21	Sára Peterková	Czech Republic	1:09.296	+5.644	
22	Makaira Wallace	Trinidad and Tobago	1:09.822	+6.170	
23	Helena Casas	Spain	1:10.228	+6.576	
24	Aoife O'Brien	Ireland	1:12.554	+8.902	
25	Luciana Wynants	Uruguay	1:13.571	+9.919	

=== Final ===
The final was started at 17:30.

Rank	Name	Nation	Time	Behind	Notes
1st place, gold medalist(s)	Hetty van de Wouw	Netherlands	1:03.121		WR
2nd place, silver medalist(s)	Yana Burlakova	Individual Neutral Athletes	1:04.797	+1.676	
3rd place, bronze medalist(s)	Ellesse Andrews	New Zealand	1:04.909	+1.788	
4	Lea Friedrich	Germany	1:04.944	+1.823	
5	Stefany Cuadrado	Colombia	1:04.946	+1.825	
6	Martina Fidanza	Italy	1:05.573	+2.452	
7	Pauline Grabosch	Germany	1:05.956	+2.835	
8	Rhian Edmunds	Great Britain	1:06.048	+2.927	
