= 2021 UEC European Track Championships – Women's sprint =

Women's sprint at the 2021 UEC European Track Championships
- Venue: Tissot Velodrome, Grenchen
- Date: 6–7 October
- Competitors: 17 from 11 nations

Medalists
gold medal	Shanne Braspennincx	Netherlands
silver medal	Lea Friedrich	Germany
bronze medal	Mathilde Gros	France

The women's sprint competition at the 2021 UEC European Track Championships was held on 6 and 7 October 2021.

== Results ==
=== Qualifying ===
The top 16 riders qualified for the 1/8 finals.

Rank	Name	Nation	Time	Behind	Notes
1	Lea Friedrich	Germany	10.464		Q
2	Mathilde Gros	France	10.487	+0.023	Q
3	Shanne Braspennincx	Netherlands	10.601	+0.137	Q
4	Olena Starikova	Ukraine	10.603	+0.139	Q
5	Sophie Capewell	Great Britain	10.734	+0.270	Q
6	Hetty van de Wouw	Netherlands	10.736	+0.272	Q
7	Anastasia Voynova	Russia	10.764	+0.300	Q
8	Pauline Grabosch	Germany	10.785	+0.321	Q
9	Daria Shmeleva	Russia	10.880	+0.416	Q
10	Miriam Vece	Italy	10.894	+0.430	Q
11	Blaine Ridge-Davis	Great Britain	11.025	+0.561	Q
12	Nicky Degrendele	Belgium	11.157	+0.693	Q
13	Veronika Jaborníková	Czech Republic	11.248	+0.784	Q
14	Elena Bissolati	Italy	11.278	+0.814	Q
15	Nikola Sibiak	Poland	11.285	+0.821	Q
16	Helena Casas	Spain	11.308	+0.844	Q
17	Oleksandra Lohviniuk	Ukraine	11.322	+0.858	

=== 1/8 finals ===
Heat winners advanced to the quarterfinals.

Heat	Rank	Name	Nation	Time	Notes
1	1	Lea Friedrich	Germany	X	Q
1	2	Helena Casas	Spain	+0.152	
2	1	Mathilde Gros	France	X	Q
2	2	Nikola Sibiak	Poland	+0.931	
3	1	Shanne Braspennincx	Netherlands	X	Q
3	2	Elena Bissolati	Italy	+1.445	
4	1	Olena Starikova	Ukraine	X	Q
4	2	Veronika Jaborníková	Czech Republic	+0.105	
5	1	Sophie Capewell	Great Britain	X	Q
5	2	Nicky Degrendele	Belgium	+0.031	
6	1	Hetty van de Wouw	Netherlands	X	Q
6	2	Blaine Ridge-Davis	Great Britain	+0.435	
7	1	Anastasia Voynova	Russia	X	Q
7	2	Miriam Vece	Italy	+0.105	
8	1	Daria Shmeleva	Russia	X	Q
8	2	Pauline Grabosch	Germany	+0.005	

=== Quarterfinals ===
Matches are extended to a best-of-three format hereon; winners proceed to the semifinals.

Heat	Rank	Name	Nation	Race 1	Race 2	Decider (i.r.)	Notes
1	1	Lea Friedrich	Germany	X	X		Q
1	2	Daria Shmeleva	Russia	+0.227	+0.095		
2	1	Mathilde Gros	France	X	+0.300	X	Q
2	2	Anastasia Voynova	Russia	+0.032	X	+0.147	
3	1	Shanne Braspennincx	Netherlands	X	X		Q
3	2	Hetty van de Wouw	Netherlands	+0.096	+0.097		
4	1	Olena Starikova	Ukraine	+0.019	X	X	Q
4	2	Sophie Capewell	Great Britain	X	+0.092	+0.119	

=== Semifinals ===
Winners proceed to the gold medal final; losers proceed to the bronze medal final.

Heat	Rank	Name	Nation	Race 1	Race 2	Decider (i.r.)	Notes
1	1	Lea Friedrich	Germany	+0.012	X	X	QG
1	2	Olena Starikova	Ukraine	X	+0.079	+0.028	QB
2	1	Shanne Braspennincx	Netherlands	X	X		QG
2	2	Mathilde Gros	France	+0.118	+0.068		QB

=== Finals ===
Rank	Name	Nation	Race 1	Race 2	Decider (i.r.)
Gold medal final
1st place, gold medalist(s)	Shanne Braspennincx	Netherlands	X	X	
2nd place, silver medalist(s)	Lea Friedrich	Germany	+0.092	+0.024	
Bronze medal final
3rd place, bronze medalist(s)	Mathilde Gros	France	X	X	
4	Olena Starikova	Ukraine	+0.040	+0.045	
