= 2024 UEC European Track Championships – Women's keirin =

Cycling competition

Women's keirin at the 2024 UEC European Track Championships
- Venue: Omnisport Apeldoorn, Apeldoorn
- Date: 14 January
- Competitors: 19 from 11 nations

Medalists
gold medal	Lea Sophie Friedrich	Germany
silver medal	Emma Finucane	Great Britain
bronze medal	Hetty van de Wouw	Netherlands

The women's keirin competition at the 2024 UEC European Track Championships was held on 14 January 2024.

== Results ==
=== First round ===
The first two riders in each heat qualified for the second round, and all other riders advanced to the first round repechages.

Heat 1

Rank	Name	Nation	Notes
1	Lea Sophie Friedrich	Germany	Q
2	Hetty van de Wouw	Netherlands	Q
3	Sophie Capewell	Great Britain	
4	Nicky Degrendele	Belgium	
5	Helena Casas	Spain	
6	Oleksandra Lohviniuk	Ukraine	

Heat 2

Rank	Name	Nation	Notes
1	Emma Hinze	Germany	Q
2	Emma Finucane	Great Britain	Q
3	Steffie van der Peet	Netherlands	
4	Marlena Karwacka	Poland	
5	Taky Marie-Divine Kouamé	France	
6	Anna Jaborníková	Czech Republic	

Heat 3

Rank	Name	Nation	Notes
1	Mathilde Gros	France	Q
2	Urszula Łoś	Poland	Q
3	Miriam Vece	Italy	
4	Veronika Jaborníková	Czech Republic	
6	Miglė Lendel	Lithuania	
5	Julie Nicolaes	Belgium	
7	Alla Biletska	Ukraine	

=== Repechage ===
The first two riders in each heat qualify to the second round.

Heat 1

Rank	Name	Nation	Notes
1	Sophie Capewell	Great Britain	Q
2	Taky Marie-Divine Kouamé	France	Q
3	Marlena Karwacka	Poland	
4	Veronika Jaborníková	Czech Republic	
5	Oleksandra Lohviniuk	Ukraine	
6	Julie Nicolaes	Belgium	

Heat 2

Rank	Name	Nation	Notes
1	Nicky Degrendele	Belgium	Q
2	Steffie van der Peet	Netherlands	Q
3	Helena Casas	Spain	
4	Miriam Vece	Italy	
5	Alla Biletska	Ukraine	
6	Anna Jaborníková	Czech Republic	
7	Miglė Lendel	Lithuania	

=== Second round ===
The first three riders in each heat qualify to final 1–6, all other riders advance to final 7–12.

Heat 1

Rank	Name	Nation	Notes
1	Lea Friedrich	Germany	Q
2	Taky Marie-Divine Kouamé	France	Q
3	Emma Finucane	Great Britain	Q
4	Steffie van der Peet	Netherlands	
5	Helena Casas	Spain	
6	Urszula Łoś	Poland	

Heat 2

Rank	Name	Nation	Notes
1	Hetty van de Wouw	Netherlands	Q
2	Nicky Degrendele	Belgium	Q
3	Mathilde Gros	France	Q
4	Marlena Karwacka	Poland	
5	Sophie Capewell	Great Britain	
6	Emma Hinze	Germany	

=== Final ===
Small final

Rank	Name	Nation	Notes
7	Emma Hinze	Germany	
8	Sophie Capewell	Great Britain	
9	Marlena Karwacka	Poland	
10	Urszula Łoś	Poland	
11	Steffie van der Peet	Netherlands	
12	Helena Casas	Spain	

Final

Rank	Name	Nation	Notes
1st place, gold medalist(s)	Lea Sophie Friedrich	Germany	
2nd place, silver medalist(s)	Emma Finucane	Great Britain	
3rd place, bronze medalist(s)	Hetty van de Wouw	Netherlands	
4	Mathilde Gros	France	
5	Nicky Degrendele	Belgium	
6	Taky Marie-Divine Kouamé	France	
