= 2021 UEC European Track Championships – Women's 500 m time trial =

Cycling competition

Women's 500 m time trial at the 2021 UEC European Track Championships
- Venue: Tissot Velodrome, Grenchen
- Date: 8 October
- Competitors: 12 from 8 nations
- Winning time: 33.086

Medalists
gold medal	Daria Shmeleva	Russia
silver medal	Pauline Grabosch	Germany
bronze medal	Yana Tyshchenko	Russia

The women's 500 m time trial competition at the 2021 UEC European Track Championships was held on 8 October 2021.

== Results ==
=== Qualifying ===
The top 8 riders qualified for the final.

Rank	Name	Nation	Time	Behind	Notes
1	Daria Shmeleva	Russia	33.205		Q
2	Pauline Grabosch	Germany	33.351	+0.146	Q
3	Yana Tyshchenko	Russia	33.407	+0.202	Q
4	Kyra Lamberink	Netherlands	33.509	+0.304	Q
5	Miriam Vece	Italy	33.542	+0.337	Q
6	Steffie van der Peet	Netherlands	33.610	+0.405	Q
7	Urszula Łoś	Poland	34.281	+1.076	Q
8	Alessa-Catriona Pröpster	Germany	34.431	+1.226	Q
9	Oleksandra Lohviniuk	Ukraine	34.995	+1.790	
10	Helena Casas	Spain	35.090	+1.885	
11	Veronika Jaborníková	Czech Republic	35.186	+1.981	
12	Nikola Sibiak	Poland	35.612	+2.407	
	Olena Starikova	Ukraine	Did not start		

=== Final ===
Rank	Name	Nation	Time	Behind	Notes
1st place, gold medalist(s)	Daria Shmeleva	Russia	33.086		
2nd place, silver medalist(s)	Pauline Grabosch	Germany	33.336	+0.250	
3rd place, bronze medalist(s)	Yana Tyshchenko	Russia	33.534	+0.448	
4	Steffie van der Peet	Netherlands	33.641	+0.555	
5	Miriam Vece	Italy	33.679	+0.593	
6	Kyra Lamberink	Netherlands	33.844	+0.758	
7	Alessa-Catriona Pröpster	Germany	34.286	+1.200	
8	Urszula Łoś	Poland	34.549	+1.463	
