= 2018 UCI Track Cycling World Championships – Women's sprint =

Women's sprint at the 2018 UCI Track Cycling World Championships
- Venue: Omnisport Apeldoorn
- Location: Apeldoorn, Netherlands
- Dates: 1–2 March
- Competitors: 33 from 21 nations

Medalists
gold medal	Kristina Vogel	Germany
silver medal	Stephanie Morton	Australia
bronze medal	Pauline Grabosch	Germany

The Women's sprint competition at the 2018 UCI Track Cycling World Championships was held on 1 and 2 March 2018.

== Results ==
=== Qualifying ===
The top four riders advanced directly to the 1/8 finals; places 5 to 28 advanced to the 1/16 final.

Rank	Name	Nation	Time	Behind	Notes
1	Stephanie Morton	Australia	10.645		Q
2	Pauline Grabosch	Germany	10.713	+0.068	Q
3	Kristina Vogel	Germany	10.810	+0.165	Q
4	Daria Shmeleva	Russia	10.898	+0.253	Q
5	Lee Wai Sze	Hong Kong	10.909	+0.264	q
6	Mathilde Gros	France	10.938	+0.293	q
7	Shanne Braspennincx	Netherlands	10.949	+0.304	q
8	Simona Krupeckaitė	Lithuania	10.975	+0.330	q
9	Olena Starikova	Ukraine	10.997	+0.352	q
10	Miriam Welte	Germany	11.001	+0.356	q
11	Laurine van Riessen	Netherlands	11.013	+0.368	q
12	Miglė Marozaitė	Lithuania	11.047	+0.402	q
13	Anastasia Voynova	Russia	11.054	+0.409	q
14	Natasha Hansen	New Zealand	11.088	+0.443	q
15	Katy Marchant	Great Britain	11.090	+0.445	q
16	Lyubov Basova	Ukraine	11.101	+0.456	q
17	Tania Calvo	Spain	11.126	+0.481	q
18	Nicky Degrendele	Belgium	11.162	+0.517	q
19	Lee Hye-jin	South Korea	11.169	+0.524	q
20	Martha Bayona	Colombia	11.239	+0.594	q
21	Madalyn Godby	United States	11.247	+0.602	q
22	Yuka Kobayashi	Japan	11.248	+0.603	q
23	Emma Cumming	New Zealand	11.293	+0.648	q
24	Robyn Stewart	Ireland	11.360	+0.715	q
25	Daniela Gaxiola	Mexico	11.366	+0.721	q
26	Amelia Walsh	Canada	11.383	+0.738	q
27	Guo Yufang	China	11.420	+0.775	q
28	Kayono Maeda	Japan	11.446	+0.801	q
29	Julita Jagodzińska	Poland	11.449	+0.804	
30	Mandy Marquardt	United States	11.487	+0.842	
31	Yuli Verdugo	Mexico	11.550	+0.905	
32	Ma Wing Yu	Hong Kong	11.704	+1.059	
33	Kim Won-gyeong	South Korea	11.770	+1.125	

- Q = qualified directly for 1/8 finals
- q = qualified for 1/16 finals

=== 1/16 finals ===
Heat winners advanced to the 1/8 finals.

Heat	Rank	Name	Nation	Gap	Notes
1	1	Lee Wai Sze	Hong Kong		Q
1	2	Kayono Maeda	Japan	+0.691	
2	1	Mathilde Gros	France		Q
2	2	Guo Yufang	China	+0.320	
3	1	Shanne Braspennincx	Netherlands		Q
3	2	Amelia Walsh	Canada	+0.320	
4	1	Simona Krupeckaitė	Lithuania		Q
4	2	Daniela Gaxiola	Mexico	+0.059	
5	1	Olena Starikova	Ukraine		Q
5	2	Robyn Stewart	Ireland	+0.135	
6	1	Miriam Welte	Germany		Q
6	2	Emma Cumming	New Zealand	+0.081	
7	1	Laurine van Riessen	Netherlands		Q
7	2	Yuka Kobayashi	Japan	+0.084	
8	1	Madalyn Godby	United States		Q
8	2	Miglė Marozaitė	Lithuania	+0.006	
9	1	Anastasia Voynova	Russia		Q
9	2	Martha Bayona	Colombia	+0.130	
10	1	Natasha Hansen	New Zealand		Q
10	2	Lee Hye-jin	South Korea	+0.020	
11	1	Nicky Degrendele	Belgium		Q
11	2	Katy Marchant	Great Britain	+0.032	
12	1	Lyubov Basova	Ukraine		Q
12	2	Tania Calvo	Spain	+0.118	

Q = qualified for 1/8 finals

=== 1/8 finals ===
Heat winners advanced to the quarterfinals.

Heat	Rank	Name	Nation	Gap	Notes
1	1	Stephanie Morton	Australia		Q
1	2	Lyubov Basova	Ukraine	+0.160	
2	1	Pauline Grabosch	Germany		Q
2	2	Nicky Degrendele	Belgium	+0.036	
3	1	Kristina Vogel	Germany		Q
3	2	Natasha Hansen	New Zealand	+0.086	
4	1	Daria Shmeleva	Russia		Q
4	2	Anastasia Voynova	Russia	+0.002	
5	1	Lee Wai Sze	Hong Kong		Q
5	2	Madalyn Godby	United States	+0.148	
6	1	Laurine van Riessen	Netherlands		Q
6	2	Mathilde Gros	France	+0.010	
7	1	Shanne Braspennincx	Netherlands		Q
7	2	Miriam Welte	Germany	+0.054	
8	1	Simona Krupeckaitė	Lithuania		Q
8	2	Olena Starikova	Ukraine	+0.100	

=== Quarterfinals ===
Matches are extended to a best-of-three format hereon; winners proceed to the semifinals.

Heat	Rank	Name	Nation	Race 1	Race 2	Decider (i.r.)	Notes
1	1	Stephanie Morton	Australia	X	X		Q
1	2	Simona Krupeckaitė	Lithuania	+0.644	+0.064		
2	1	Pauline Grabosch	Germany	X	X		Q
2	2	Shanne Braspennincx	Netherlands	+0.002	+0.084		
3	1	Kristina Vogel	Germany	X	X		Q
3	2	Laurine van Riessen	Netherlands	+0.128	+0.096		
4	1	Lee Wai Sze	Hong Kong	X	X		Q
4	2	Daria Shmeleva	Russia	+0.084	+0.251		

=== Semifinals ===
Matches were extended to a best-of-three format hereon; winners proceeded to the final.

Heat	Rank	Name	Nation	Race 1	Race 2	Decider (i.r.)	Notes
1	1	Stephanie Morton	Australia	X	X		Q
1	2	Lee Wai Sze	Hong Kong	+0.000	+0.046		
2	1	Kristina Vogel	Germany	X	X		Q
2	2	Pauline Grabosch	Germany	+0.249	+0.163		

=== Finals ===
The final classification was determined in the medal finals.

Rank	Name	Nation	Race 1	Race 2	Decider (i.r.)
Gold medal race
1st place, gold medalist(s)	Kristina Vogel	Germany	X	+0.161	X
2nd place, silver medalist(s)	Stephanie Morton	Australia	+0.062	X	+0.105
Bronze medal race
3rd place, bronze medalist(s)	Pauline Grabosch	Germany	X	X	
4	Lee Wai Sze	Hong Kong	+0.026	+0.067	
