= 2014 UEC European Track Championships – Women's 500 m time trial =

Women's 500m time trial at the 2014 UEC European Track Championships
- UEC European Champion jersey
- Venue: Vélodrome Amédée Détraux, Baie-Mahault
- Date: 18 October
- Competitors: 17 from 11 nations

Medalists
| gold medal | Anastasiia Voinova | Russia |
| silver medal | Elis Ligtlee | Netherlands |
| bronze medal | Miriam Welte | Germany |

The Women's 500 m time trial was held on 18 October 2014.

== Results ==
| Rank | Name | Nation | Time | Notes |
|---|---|---|---|---|
| 1st place, gold medalist(s) | Anastasiia Voinova | Russia | 34.242 | |
| 2nd place, silver medalist(s) | Elis Ligtlee | Netherlands | 34.776 | |
| 3rd place, bronze medalist(s) | Miriam Welte | Germany | 34.842 | |
| 4 | Olga Ismayilova | Azerbaijan | 34.953 | |
| 5 | Elena Brezhniva | Russia | 35.163 | |
| 6 | Olivia Montauban | France | 35.265 | |
| 7 | Tania Calvo | Spain | 35.409 | |
| 8 | Sandie Clair | France | 35.450 | |
| 9 | Shanne Braspennincx | Netherlands | 35.773 | |
| 10 | Olena Tsos | Ukraine | 35.845 | |
| 11 | Katy Marchant | Great Britain | 36.195 | |
| 12 | Rosie Blount | Great Britain | 36.640 | |
| 13 | Olena Starikova | Ukraine | 36.695 | |
| 14 | Urszula Los | Poland | 36.919 | |
| 15 | Katarzyna Kirschenstein | Poland | 37.417 | |
| 16 | Nicky Degrendele | Belgium | 37.492 | |
| 17 | Elisa Turunen | Finland | 40.294 | |
