= 2022 UEC European Track Championships – Women's keirin =

Cycling competition

Women's keirin at the 2022 UEC European Track Championships
- Venue: Messe München, Munich
- Date: 16 August
- Competitors: 16

Medalists
gold medal	Lea Friedrich	Germany
silver medal	Urszula Łoś	Poland
bronze medal	Olena Starikova	Ukraine

The women's keirin competition at the 2022 UEC European Track Championships was held on 16 August 2022.

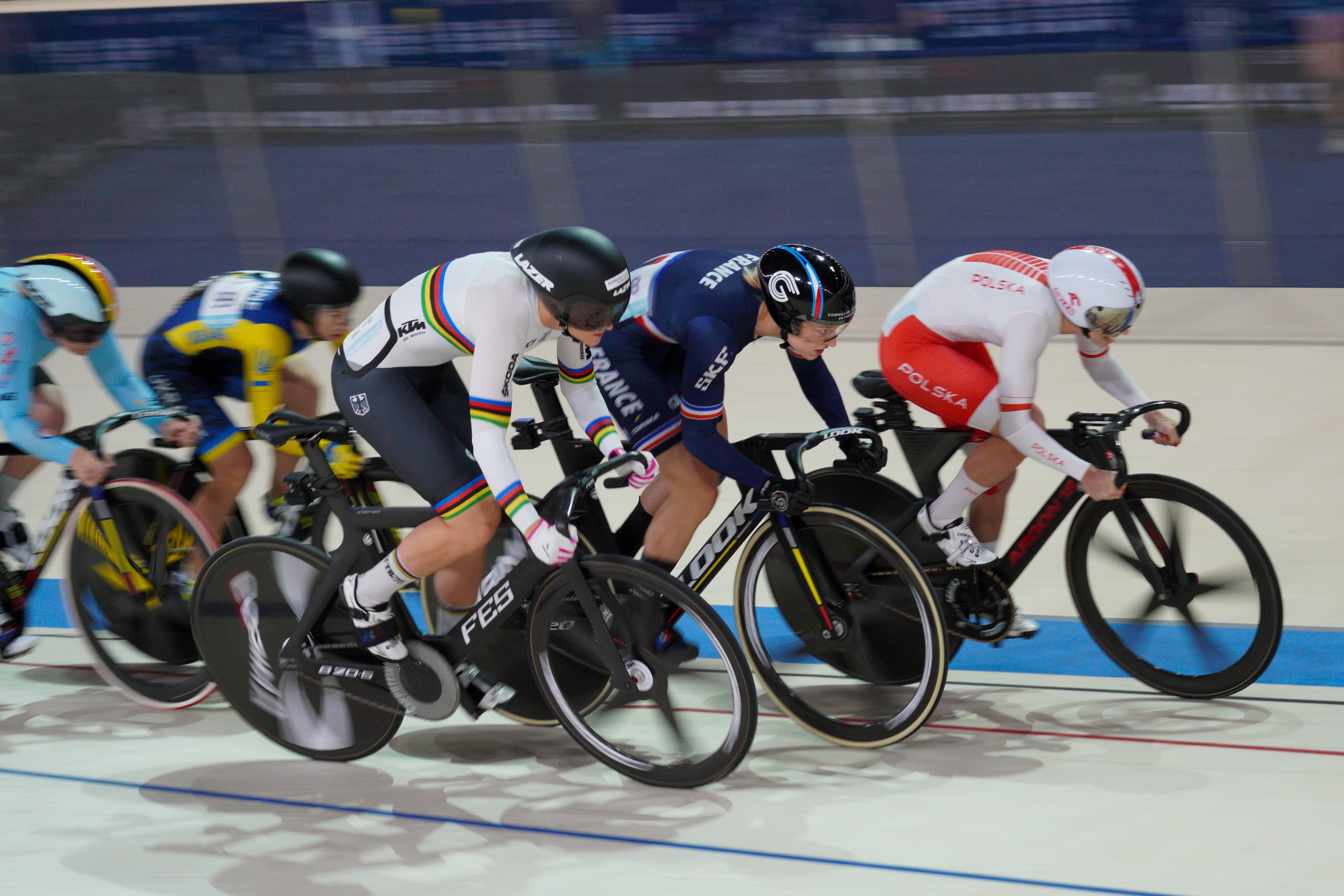
UEC Track Elite European Championships

== Results ==
=== First round ===
The first two riders in each heat qualified for the second round, and all other riders advanced to the first round repechages.

Heat 1

Rank	Name	Nation	Notes
1	Lea Friedrich	Germany	Q
2	Nicky Degrendele	Belgium	Q
3	Oleksandra Lohviniuk	Ukraine	
4	Sophie Capewell	Great Britain	
5	Taky Marie-Divine Kouamé	France	
	Steffie van der Peet	Netherlands	DNS

Heat 2

Rank	Name	Nation	Notes
1	Laurine van Riessen	Netherlands	Q
2	Urszula Łoś	Poland	Q
3	Mathilde Gros	France	
4	Veronika Jaborníková	Czech Republic	
5	Miriam Vece	Italy	
6	Lauren Bell	Great Britain	

Heat 3

Rank	Name	Nation	Notes
1	Olena Starikova	Ukraine	Q
2	Helena Casas	Spain	Q
3	Marlena Karwacka	Poland	
4	Orla Walsh	Ireland	
5	Elena Bissolati	Italy	
	Emma Hinze	Germany	DNS

=== Repechage ===
The first two riders in each heat qualify to the second round.

Heat 1

Rank	Name	Nation	Notes
1	Veronika Jaborníková	Czech Republic	Q
2	Taky Marie-Divine Kouamé	France	Q
3	Oleksandra Lohviniuk	Ukraine	

Heat 2

Rank	Name	Nation	Notes
1	Mathilde Gros	France	Q
2	Orla Walsh	Ireland	Q
3	Elena Bissolati	Italy	
4	Lauren Bell	Great Britain	

Heat 3

Rank	Name	Nation	Notes
1	Marlena Karwacka	Poland	Q
2	Sophie Capewell	Great Britain	Q
3	Miriam Vece	Italy	

=== Second round ===
The first three riders in each heat qualify to final 1–6, all other riders advance to final 7–12.

Heat 1

Rank	Name	Nation	Notes
1	Lea Friedrich	Germany	Q
2	Urszula Łoś	Poland	Q
3	Sophie Capewell	Great Britain	Q
4	Helena Casas	Spain	
5	Taky Marie-Divine Kouamé	France	
6	Veronika Jaborníková	Czech Republic	

Heat 2

Rank	Name	Nation	Notes
1	Nicky Degrendele	Belgium	Q
2	Mathilde Gros	France	Q
3	Olena Starikova	Ukraine	Q
4	Laurine van Riessen	Netherlands	
5	Marlena Karwacka	Poland	
6	Orla Walsh	Ireland	

=== Final ===
Small final

Rank	Name	Nation	Notes
7	Laurine van Riessen	Netherlands	
8	Marlena Karwacka	Poland	
9	Veronika Jaborníková	Czech Republic	
10	Helena Casas	Spain	
11	Taky Marie-Divine Kouamé	France	
12	Orla Walsh	Ireland	

Final

Rank	Name	Nation	Notes
1st place, gold medalist(s)	Lea Friedrich	Germany	
2nd place, silver medalist(s)	Urszula Łoś	Poland	
3rd place, bronze medalist(s)	Olena Starikova	Ukraine	
4	Nicky Degrendele	Belgium	
5	Mathilde Gros	France	
6	Sophie Capewell	Great Britain	
