= 2021 UEC European Track Championships – Women's team sprint =

Women's team sprint at the 2021 UEC European Track Championships
- Venue: Tissot Velodrome, Grenchen
- Date: 5 October
- Competitors: 21 from 6 nations
- Winning time: 46.551

Medalists
gold medal	Shanne Braspennincx; Kyra Lamberink; Hetty van de Wouw; Steffie van der Peet	Netherlands
silver medal	Lea Friedrich; Pauline Grabosch; Alessa-Catriona Pröpster	Germany
bronze medal	Natalia Antonova; Daria Shmeleva; Yana Tyshchenko; Anastasia Voynova	Russia

The women's team sprint competition at the 2021 UEC European Track Championships was held on 5 October 2021.

== Results ==
=== Qualifying ===
All teams advanced to the first round.

Rank	Nation	Time	Behind	Notes
1	Netherlands; Shanne Braspennincx; Kyra Lamberink; Steffie van der Peet	46.759		WR
2	Russia; Natalia Antonova; Anastasia Voynova; Yana Tyshchenko	47.216	+0.457	
3	Germany; Pauline Grabosch; Lea Friedrich; Alessa-Catriona Pröpster	47.527	+0.768	
4	Great Britain; Milly Tanner; Sophie Capewell; Blaine Ridge-Davis	47.812	+1.053	
5	Poland; Marlena Karwacka; Urszula Łoś; Nikola Sibiak	48.899	+2.140	
6	Ukraine; Liubov Basova; Olena Starikova; Oleksandra Lohviniuk	50.092	+3.333	

=== First round ===
First round heats were held as follows:
Heat 1: 4th v 5th fastest
Heat 2: 3rd v 6th fastest
Heat 3: 2nd fastest alone
Heat 4: 1st fastest alone

The heat winners were ranked on time, from which the top 2 proceeded to the gold medal final and the other 2 proceeded to the bronze medal final.

Heat	Rank	Nation	Time	Notes
1	1	Great Britain; Lauren Bate; Blaine Ridge-Davis; Milly Tanner	47.834	QB
1	2	Poland; Marlena Karwacka; Urszula Łoś; Nikola Sibiak	48.237	
2	1	Germany; Lea Friedrich; Pauline Grabosch; Alessa-Catriona Pröpster	47.189	QG
2	2	Ukraine; Liubov Basova; Oleksandra Lohviniuk; Olena Starikova	49.077	
3	1	Russia; Natalia Antonova; Daria Shmeleva; Anastasia Voynova	47.290	QB
4	1	Netherlands; Shanne Braspennincx; Kyra Lamberink; Hetty van de Wouw	47.072	QG

=== Finals ===
Rank	Nation	Time	Behind	Notes
Gold medal final
1st place, gold medalist(s)	Netherlands; Shanne Braspennincx; Kyra Lamberink; Hetty van de Wouw	46.551		WR
2nd place, silver medalist(s)	Germany; Lea Friedrich; Pauline Grabosch; Alessa-Catriona Pröpster	47.299	+0.748	
Bronze medal final
3rd place, bronze medalist(s)	Russia; Natalia Antonova; Daria Shmeleva; Yana Tyshchenko	46.795		
4	Great Britain; Lauren Bate; Blaine Ridge-Davis; Milly Tanner	47.702	+0.907	
