= 2017 UEC European Track Championships – Women's team sprint =

Women's team sprint at the 2017 UEC European Track Championships
- UEC European Champion jersey
- Venue: Velodrom, Berlin
- Date: 19 October
- Competitors: 20 from 9 nations
- Winning time: 32.560

Medalists
gold medal	Anastasia Voynova; Daria Shmeleva	Russia
silver medal	Miriam Welte; Kristina Vogel; Pauline Grabosch	Germany
bronze medal	Kyra Lamberink; Shanne Braspennincx; Hetty van de Wouw	Netherlands

The Women's team sprint was held on 19 October 2017.

== Results ==
=== Qualifying ===
The fastest 8 teams qualify for the first round.

Rank	Name	Nation	Time	Notes
1	Pauline Grabosch; Kristina Vogel	Germany	32.652	Q
2	Anastasia Voynova; Daria Shmeleva	Russia	32.843	Q
3	Tania Calvo; Helena Casas	Spain	33.307	Q
4	Kyra Lamberink; Hetty van de Wouw	Netherlands	33.342	Q
5	Miglė Marozaitė; Simona Krupeckaitė	Lithuania	33.366	Q
6	Sandie Clair; Mathilde Gros	France	33.734	Q
7	Miriam Vece; Elena Bissolati	Italy	33.797	Q
8	Sophie Capewell; Katy Marchant	Great Britain	33.834	Q
9	Urszula Łoś; Julita Jagodzińska	Poland	34.281	

=== First round ===
First round heats are held as follows:
Heat 1: 4th v 5th qualifier
Heat 2: 3rd v 6th qualifier
Heat 3: 2nd v 7th qualifier
Heat 4: 1st v 8th qualifier

The heat winners are ranked on time, from which the top 2 proceed to the gold medal final and the other 2 proceed to the bronze medal final.

Rank	Heat	Name	Nation	Time	Notes
1	3	Anastasia Voynova; Daria Shmeleva	Russia	32.324	QG
2	4	Miriam Welte; Kristina Vogel	Germany	32.951	QG
3	1	Kyra Lamberink; Shanne Braspennincx	Netherlands	32.969	QB
4	2	Sandie Clair; Mathilde Gros	France	33.220	QB
5	2	Tania Calvo; Helena Casas	Spain	33.288	
6	1	Miglė Marozaitė; Simona Krupeckaitė	Lithuania	33.390	
7	4	Sophie Capewell; Katy Marchant	Great Britain	34.147	
8	3	Miriam Vece; Elena Bissolati	Italy	34.228	

- QG = qualified for gold medal final
- QB = qualified for bronze medal final

=== Finals ===
The final classification is determined in the medal finals.

Rank	Name	Nation	Time	Notes
Bronze medal final
3rd place, bronze medalist(s)	Kyra Lamberink; Shanne Braspennincx	Netherlands	33.180	
4	Sandie Clair; Mathilde Gros	France	33.700	
Gold medal final
1st place, gold medalist(s)	Anastasia Voynova; Daria Shmeleva	Russia	32.560	
2nd place, silver medalist(s)	Miriam Welte; Kristina Vogel	Germany	32.807	
