= 2017 UCI Track Cycling World Championships – Women's 500 m time trial =

Women's 500 m time trial at the 2017 UCI Track Cycling World Championships
- Venue: Hong Kong Velodrome
- Location: Hong Kong
- Dates: 15 April
- Competitors: 21 from 13 nations
- Winning time: 33.282

Medalists
gold medal	Daria Shmeleva	Russia
silver medal	Miriam Welte	Germany
bronze medal	Anastasia Voynova	Russia

The Women's 500 m time trial competition at the 2017 World Championships was held on 15 April 2017.

== Results ==
=== Qualifying ===
The top 8 riders qualified for the final.

Rank	Name	Nation	Time	Behind	Notes
1	Anastasia Voynova	Russia	33.325		Q
2	Daria Shmeleva	Russia	33.419	+0.094	Q
3	Miriam Welte	Germany	33.450	+0.125	Q
4	Lee Wai Sze	Hong Kong	33.647	+0.322	Q
5	Pauline Grabosch	Germany	33.732	+0.407	Q
6	Martha Bayona	Colombia	34.153	+0.828	Q
7	Tania Calvo	Spain	34.209	+0.884	Q
8	Laurine van Riessen	Netherlands	34.276	+0.951	Q
9	Kyra Lamberink	Netherlands	34.329	+1.004	
10	Jessica Salazar	Mexico	34.331	+1.006	
11	Olena Starikova	Ukraine	34.337	+1.012	
12	Natasha Hansen	New Zealand	34.375	+1.050	
13	Katy Marchant	Great Britain	34.659	+1.334	
14	Helena Casas	Spain	34.693	+1.368	
15	Juliana Gaviria	Colombia	34.774	+1.449	
16	Miriam Vece	Italy	34.822	+1.497	
17	Miglė Marozaitė	Lithuania	34.859	+1.534	
18	Yuli Verdugo	Mexico	34.975	+1.650	
19	Tatiana Kiseleva	Russia	35.638	+2.313	
20	Deborah Herold	India	35.841	+2.516	
21	Ma Wing Yu	Hong Kong	37.128	+3.803	

=== Final ===
The final was held at 19:03.

Rank	Name	Nation	Time	Behind
1st place, gold medalist(s)	Daria Shmeleva	Russia	33.282	
2nd place, silver medalist(s)	Miriam Welte	Germany	33.382	+0.100
3rd place, bronze medalist(s)	Anastasia Voynova	Russia	33.454	+0.172
4	Lee Wai Sze	Hong Kong	33.723	+0.441
5	Pauline Grabosch	Germany	33.855	+0.573
6	Martha Bayona	Colombia	34.291	+1.009
7	Tania Calvo	Spain	34.489	+1.207
8	Laurine van Riessen	Netherlands	34.526	+1.244
