= 2022 UEC European Track Championships – Women's team sprint =

Women's team sprint at the 2022 UEC European Track Championships
- Venue: Messe München, Munich
- Date: 11–12 August
- Competitors: 22 from 7 nations

Medalists
gold medal	Lea Friedrich; Pauline Grabosch; Emma Hinze	Germany
silver medal	Shanne Braspennincx; Kyra Lamberink; Hetty van de Wouw; Steffie van der Peet	Netherlands
bronze medal	Marlena Karwacka; Urszula Łoś; Nikola Sibiak	Poland

The women's team sprint competition at the 2022 UEC European Track Championships was held on 11 and 12 August 2022.

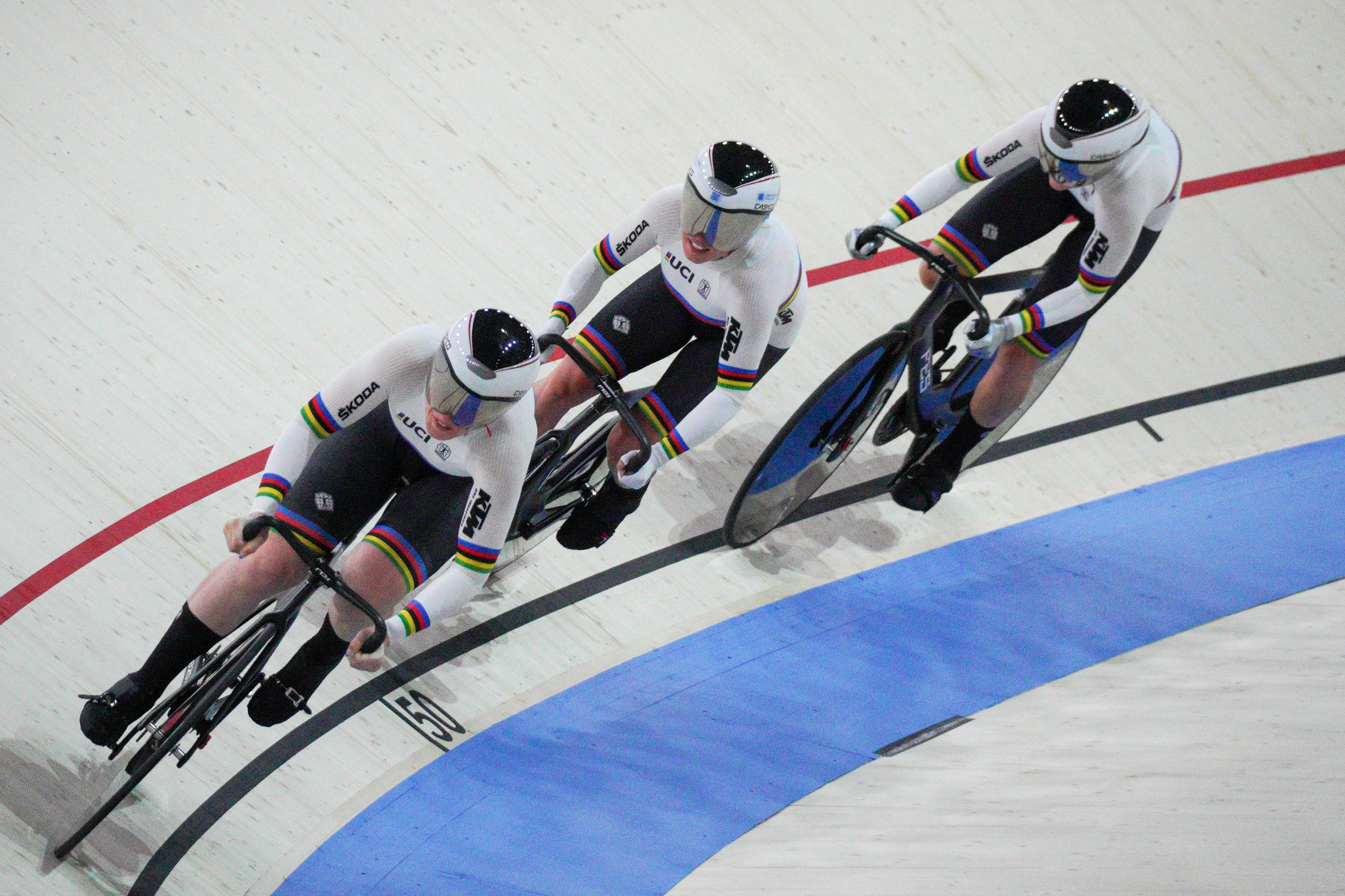
UEC Track Elite European Championships

== Results ==
=== Qualifying ===
All teams advanced to the first round.

Rank	Nation	Time	Behind	Notes
1	Germany; Lea Friedrich; Pauline Grabosch; Emma Hinze	38.097		
2	Netherlands; Kyra Lamberink; Steffie van der Peet; Hetty van de Wouw	38.492	+0.395	
3	France; Mathilde Gros; Taky Marie-Divine Kouamé; Julie Michaux	38.926	+0.829	
4	Great Britain; Lauren Bell; Sophie Capewell; Emma Finucane	38.960	+0.863	
5	Poland; Marlena Karwacka; Urszula Łoś; Nikola Sibiak	39.029	+0.932	
6	Ukraine; Alla Biletska; Oleksandra Lohviniuk; Olena Starikova	40.240	+2.143	
7	Hungary; Petra Jászapáti; Zsuzsanna Kercsó-Magos; Boglárka Sáry	44.632	+6.535	

=== First round ===
The first two team raced for gold medal, the third and fourth fastest teams raced for the bronze medal.

Rank	Heat	Nation	Time	Notes
1	7	Germany; Lea Friedrich; Pauline Grabosch; Emma Hinze	38.114	QG
2	6	Netherlands; Shanne Braspennincx; Kyra Lamberink; Hetty van de Wouw	38.474	QG
3	3	Poland; Marlena Karwacka; Urszula Łoś; Nikola Sibiak	38.970	QB
4	5	France; Mathilde Gros; Taky Marie-Divine Kouamé; Julie Michaux	39.150	QB
5	2	Ukraine; Alla Biletska; Oleksandra Lohviniuk; Olena Starikova	40.073	
6	1	Hungary; Petra Jászapáti; Zsuzsanna Kercsó-Magos; Boglárka Sáry	44.605	
	4	Great Britain; Lauren Bell; Sophie Capewell; Emma Finucane	DNF	

=== Finals ===
Rank	Nation	Time	Behind	Notes
Gold medal final
1st place, gold medalist(s)	Germany; Lea Friedrich; Pauline Grabosch; Emma Hinze	38.061		
2nd place, silver medalist(s)	Netherlands; Shanne Braspennincx; Kyra Lamberink; Hetty van de Wouw	38.304	+0.243	
Bronze medal final
3rd place, bronze medalist(s)	Poland; Marlena Karwacka; Urszula Łoś; Nikola Sibiak	39.164		
4	France; Mathilde Gros; Taky Marie-Divine Kouamé; Julie Michaux	39.341	+0.177	
