= 2018 UCI Track Cycling World Championships – Women's team sprint =

Women's team sprint at the 2018 UCI Track Cycling World Championships
- Venue: Omnisport Apeldoorn
- Location: Apeldoorn, Netherlands
- Dates: 28 February
- Competitors: 33 from 14 nations
- Teams: 14
- Winning time: 32.605

Medalists
gold medal	Miriam Welte; Kristina Vogel; Pauline Grabosch	Germany
silver medal	Kyra Lamberink; Shanne Braspennincx; Laurine van Riessen; Hetty van de Wouw	Netherlands
bronze medal	Daria Shmeleva; Anastasia Voynova	Russia

The women's team sprint competition at the 2018 UCI Track Cycling World Championships was held on 28 February 2018 at the Omnisport Apeldoorn in Apeldoorn, Netherlands.

== Results ==
=== Qualifying ===
The eight fastest teams advance to the first round.

Rank	Nation	Time	Behind	Notes
1	Germany; Miriam Welte; Pauline Grabosch	32.640		Q
2	Russia; Daria Shmeleva; Anastasia Voynova	32.739	+0.099	Q
3	China; Song Chaorui; Zhong Tianshi	33.210	+0.570	Q
4	Netherlands; Laurine van Riessen; Hetty van de Wouw	33.415	+0.775	Q
5	Mexico; Jessica Salazar; Yuli Verdugo	33.604	+0.964	Q
6	Great Britain; Lauren Bate; Katy Marchant	33.624	+0.984	Q
7	New Zealand; Emma Cumming; Natasha Hansen	33.666	+1.026	Q
8	Poland; Marlena Karwacka; Urszula Łoś	33.867	+1.227	Q
9	Spain; Tania Calvo; Helena Casas	33.939	+1.299	
10	United States; Madalyn Godby; Mandy Marquardt	34.022	+1.382	
11	Italy; Miriam Vece; Elena Bissolati	34.373	+1.733	
12	South Korea; Kim Won-gyeong; Lee Hye-jin	34.443	+1.803	
13	Hong Kong; Hoi Yan Jessica; Ma Wing Yu	35.791	+3.151	
14	India; Deborah Herold; Alena Reji	36.086	+3.446	

=== First round ===
First round heats were held as follows:
Heat 1: 4th v 5th fastest
Heat 2: 3rd v 6th fastest
Heat 3: 2nd v 7th fastest
Heat 4: 1st v 8th fastest

The heat winners were ranked on time, from which the top 2 proceeded to the gold medal final and the other 2 proceeded to the bronze medal final.

Rank	Overall rank	Nation	Time	Behind	Notes
1 vs 8
1	1	Germany; Miriam Welte; Pauline Grabosch	32.652		QG
2	8	Poland; Marlena Karwacka; Julita Jagodzińska	34.100	+1.448	
2 vs 7
1	3	Russia; Daria Shmeleva; Anastasia Voynova	32.987		QB
2	5	New Zealand; Emma Cumming; Natasha Hansen	33.453	+0.534	
3 vs 6
1	4	China; Song Chaorui; Zhong Tianshi	33.295		QB
2	6	Great Britain; Lauren Bate; Katy Marchant	33.623	+0.328	
4 vs 5
1	2	Netherlands; Kyra Lamberink; Shanne Braspennincx	32.958		QG
2	7	Mexico; Jessica Salazar; Daniela Gaxiola	33.881	+0.923	

- QG = qualified for gold medal final
- QB = qualified for bronze medal final

=== Finals ===
The final classification was decided in the medal finals.

Rank	Nation	Time	Behind	Notes
Gold medal race
1st place, gold medalist(s)	Germany; Miriam Welte; Kristina Vogel	32.605		
2nd place, silver medalist(s)	Netherlands; Kyra Lamberink; Shanne Braspennincx	33.124	+0.519	
Bronze medal race
3rd place, bronze medalist(s)	Russia; Daria Shmeleva; Anastasia Voynova	32.990		
4	China; Song Chaorui; Zhong Tianshi	33.282	+0.292	
