= 2026 UCI Track Cycling World Championships – Women's 1 km time trial =

Women's 1 km time trial at the 2026 UCI Track Cycling World Championships
- Venue: Shanghai Velodrome
- Location: Shanghai, China
- Dates: 17 October
- Competitors: 23 from 17 nations
- Winning time: 1:04.572

Medalists
gold medal	Pauline Grabosch	Germany
silver medal	Hetty van de Wouw	Netherlands
bronze medal	Sofie van Rooijen	Netherlands

The Women's 1 km time trial competition at the 2026 UCI Track Cycling World Championships was held on 17 October 2026.

== Results ==
=== Qualifying ===
The qualifying was started at 11:00. The top eight riders qualified for the final.

Rank	Name	Nation	Time	Behind	Notes
1	Pauline Grabosch	Germany	1:03.804		Q
2	Hetty van de Wouw	Netherlands	1:04.573	+0.769	Q
3	Yana Burlakova	Individual Neutral Athletes	1:04.607	+0.803	Q
4	Mathilde Gros	France	1:04.791	+0.987	Q
5	Sofie van Rooijen	Netherlands	1:05.348	+1.544	Q
6	Claudia Marcks	Australia	1:05.600	+1.796	Q
7	Stefany Cuadrado	Colombia	1:06.207	+2.403	Q
8	Marie-Louisa Drouode	France	1:07.180	+3.376	Q
9	Yuli Verdugo	Mexico	1:07.206	+3.402	
10	Hayley Yoslov	United States	1:07.226	+3.422	
11	Miriam Vece	Italy	1:07.316	+3.512	
12	Lowri Thomas	Great Britain	1:07.550	+3.746	
13	Clara Schneider	Germany	1:07.702	+3.898	
14	Mizuki Ikeda	Japan	1:07.803	+3.999	
15	Marith Vanhove	Belgium	1:08.647	+4.843	
16	Sára Peterková	Czechia	1:08.949	+5.145	
17	Emma Jeffers	Ireland	1:09.332	+5.528	
18	Anna Jaborníková	Czechia	1:09.618	+5.814	
19	Phoebe Tung	Hong Kong	1:09.975	+6.171	
20	Andrea Robles	Mexico	1:10.469	+6.665	
21	Kayla Hankins	United States	1:10.616	+6.812	
22	Javiera Garrido	Chile	1:11.566	+7.762	
	Hanna Tserakh	Belarus	Did not finish		

=== Final ===
The final was started at 17:35.

Rank	Name	Nation	Time	Behind	Notes
1st place, gold medalist(s)	Pauline Grabosch	Germany	1:04.572		
2nd place, silver medalist(s)	Hetty van de Wouw	Netherlands	1:05.223	+0.651	
3rd place, bronze medalist(s)	Sofie van Rooijen	Netherlands	1:05.398	+0.826	
4	Yana Burlakova	Individual Neutral Athletes	1:05.431	+0.859	
5	Mathilde Gros	France	1:05.603	+1.031	
6	Claudia Marcks	Australia	1:05.903	+1.331	
7	Stefany Cuadrado	Colombia	1:06.711	+2.139	
8	Marie-Louisa Drouode	France	1:07.734	+3.162	
