= Stephanie Morton =

Australian cyclist (born 1990)

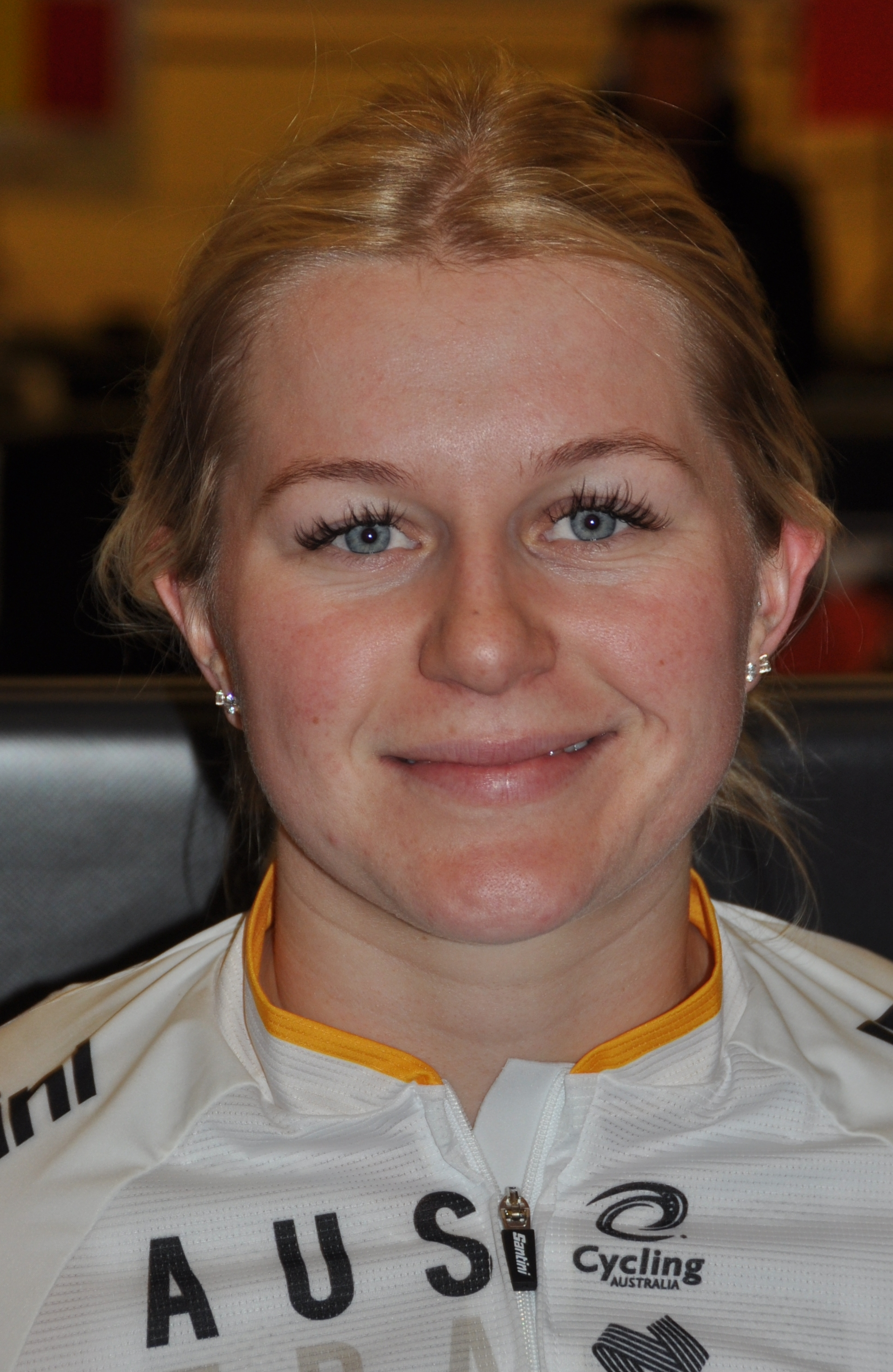
- Morton in 2018

Personal information
- Born: 28 November 1990 (age 35) Adelaide, South Australia
- Height: 1.77 m (5 ft 10 in)
- Weight: 77 kg (170 lb)

Cycling career
- Sport: Cycling
- Discipline: Track
- Role: Rider
Medal record
Representing Australia
World Championships
Gold medal – first place	2019 Pruszków	Team sprint
Silver medal – second place	2017 Hong Kong	Sprint
Silver medal – second place	2017 Hong Kong	Team sprint
Silver medal – second place	2018 Apeldoorn	Sprint
Silver medal – second place	2019 Pruszków	Sprint
Silver medal – second place	2020 Berlin	Team sprint
Bronze medal – third place	2020 Berlin	Keirin
Commonwealth Games
Gold medal – first place	2014 Glasgow	Sprint
Gold medal – first place	2018 Gold Coast	Team sprint
Gold medal – first place	2018 Gold Coast	Sprint
Gold medal – first place	2018 Gold Coast	Keirin
Silver medal – second place	2014 Glasgow	500 m time trial
Silver medal – second place	2018 Gold Coast	500 m time trial
Paralympic Games
Gold medal – first place	2012 London	1km time trial B VI 1–3
UCI Para-cycling Track World Championships
Gold medal – first place	2012 Los Angeles	B Tandem 1 km time trial
Gold medal – first place	2012 Los Angeles	B Tandem Sprint

Stephanie Morton, OAM (born 28 November 1990) is a retired Australian track cyclist who participated in the 2016 Summer Olympic Games. She has won national and international cycling titles, and was Felicity Johnson's tandem pilot at the 2012 Summer Paralympics in London, where she won a gold medal.

== Personal ==
Stephanie Morton was born in Adelaide on 28 November 1990. As of 2013, she works for the "Bee Safe on Bikes" education program for junior primary school students.

== Cycling ==
Morton is a member of South Coast Cycling Club and is part of Team Jayco AIS. She started cycling competitively at the age of 15. Competing at the 2011 National Keirin Final, she finished second behind Anna Meares. She made her Australian national team debut at the 2011 Para-cycling Track World Championships with Felicity Johnson. She has said forming a friendship and real partnership was key for the pair's success.

In 2012, she participated in the UCI Para-cycling Track World Championships in Los Angeles as the pilot for Johnson, and finished first in the B tandem 1 km time trial and the B Tandem sprint. At the 2012 London Paralympics, they won a gold medal in the Women's 1 km Time Trial B event, and were subsequently awarded the Medal of the Order of Australia in the 2014 Australia Day Honours "for service to sport as a Gold Medallist at the London 2012 Paralympic Games."

In November 2012, Morton came first in the Keirin and second in the sprint at the Oceania Track Championships. In the third round of the 2012–13 UCI Track Cycling World Cup Classics in Aguascalientes, Mexico, she came first in the team sprint with Kaarle McCulloch and 6th in the keirin, while at the 2013 UCI Track Cycling World Championships in Minsk, Belarus, she came fourth in the team sprint (with McCulloch) and sixth in the individual sprint.

At the 2013 Australian National Track Championships in Sydney, she came first in the keirin, individual sprint, and team sprint (with Rikki Belder). In February 2014, she scored an upset win at the Australian track cycling championships by beating Anna Meares in the Keiren for the first time. Meares tweeted a photo of a cap that she had signed for Morton five years before, on which she had written: "Steph, maybe one day you'll beat me".

At the 2014 Commonwealth Games in Glasgow, Morton competed in the track sprint and 500 m time trial, while Johnson had a new partner, Holly Takos. Morton rode a personal best time of 34.079 in the 500 m time trial at the Sir Chris Hoy Velodrome, but won silver after Anna Meares posted a faster time. However, she defeated Meares in the track sprint, winning two heats to none in the best-of-three final to take the gold medal.

== Major results ==
2011
1st Tandem B – 1000m Time Trial, UCI Para-cycling Track World Championships (Pilot for Felicity Johnson)
1st Tandem B – 1000m Time Trial, New Zealand Oceania Para-Cycling Regional Cup (Pilot for Felicity Johnson)
2012
1st Tandem B – 1000m Time Trial, Paralympic Games (Pilot for Felicity Johnson)
UCI Para-cycling Track World Championships

1st Tandem B – 1000m Time Trial (Pilot for Felicity Johnson)
1st Tandem B – Sprint (Pilot for Felicity Johnson)

2013
Melbourne Cup on Wheels

1st Keirin
2nd Sprint

2014
Oceania Track Championships

1st Keirin
1st Sprint
1st Team Sprint (with Kaarle McCulloch)

Commonwealth Games

1st Sprint
2nd 500m Time Trial

Adelaide Cycling Grand Prix

1st Sprint
2nd Keirin

1st Sprint, Super Drome Cup
2nd Sprint, South Australian Track Classic
2015
Oceania Track Championships

1st Keirin
1st Team Sprint
2nd Sprint

3rd Sprint, Super Drome Cup
2016
Austral

1st Keirin
1st Sprint

Oceania Track Championships

2nd Keirin
3rd Sprint

2nd Sprint, ITS Melbourne DISC Grand Prix
2nd Sprint, ITS Melbourne Grand Prix

2016 Summer Olympic Games

=13th Cycling Track Keirin
13th Cycling Track Sprint
4th Cycling Track Sprint

2017
Oceania Track Championships

1st Team Sprint (with Kaarle McCulloch)
1st Sprint
1st Keirin

Australian Track Championships

1st Sprint
1st Team Sprint (with Rikki Belder)
1st Keirin

ITS Melbourne – DISC Grand Prix

1st Keirin
1st Sprint

ITS Melbourne – Hisense Grand Prix

1st Keirin
1st Sprint

Austral

1st Keirin
2nd Sprint

UCI World Track Championships

2nd Sprint
2nd Team Sprint (with Kaarle McCulloch)

2nd Sprint, Round 1, (Pruszków) Track Cycling World Cup
2018
Commonwealth Games

1st Team Sprint (with Kaarle McCulloch)
1st Sprint
1st Keirin
2nd 500m Time Trial
