= 2018 UCI Track Cycling World Championships =

Track cycling championships

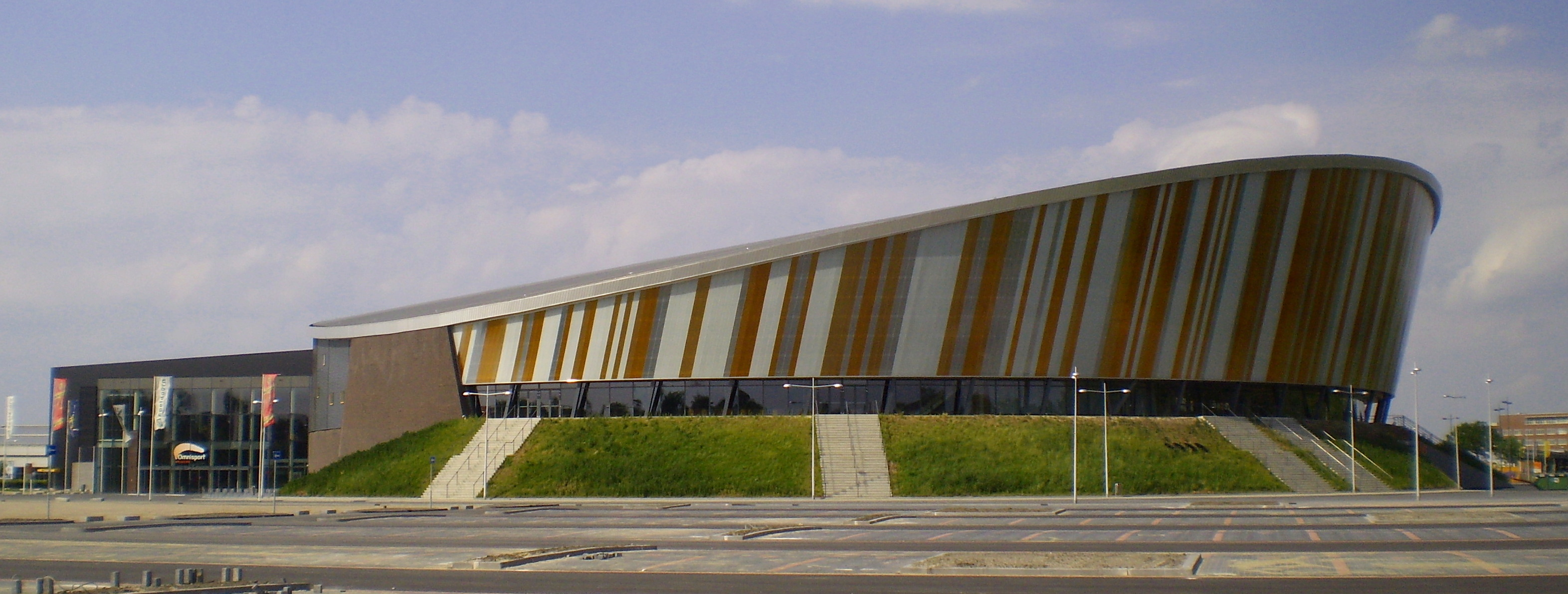
- Venue: Apeldoorn, Netherlands
- Date: 28 February – 4 March
- Velodrome: Omnisport Apeldoorn
- Nations participating: 40
- Events: 20

The 2018 UCI Track Cycling World Championships were the World Championships for track cycling in 2018. They took place in the Netherlands at the Omnisport Apeldoorn from 28 February to 4 March 2018.

== Schedule ==
The schedule of events was as follows:

Competition	F	Final

Men
Date →	Wed 28		Thu 1		Fri 2		Sat 3		Sun 4	
Event ↓	A	E	A	E	A	E	A	E	A	E
1 km time trial									Q	F
Pursuit					Q	F				
Keirin			R1, R	R2, F						
Omnium							SR, TR	ER, PR		
Points race						F				
Scratch				F						
Sprint					Q, ^{1}/_{16}, ^{1}/_{8}		QF	SF, F		
Team pursuit	Q	R1		F						
Team sprint		Q, R1, F								
Madison										F

Women
Date →	Wed 28		Thu 1		Fri 2		Sat 3		Sun 4	
Event ↓	A	E	A	E	A	E	A	E	A	E
500 m time trial							Q	F		
Pursuit							Q	F		
Keirin									R1, R	R2, F
Omnium					SR, TR	ER, PR				
Points race										F
Scratch		F								
Sprint			Q, ^{1}/_{16}, ^{1}/_{8}	QF		SF, F				
Team pursuit	Q			R1, F						
Team sprint		Q, R1, F								
Madison								F		

A = Afternoon session, E = Evening session
Q = qualifiers, R1 = first round, R2 = second round, R = repechages, ^{1}/_{16} = sixteenth finals, ^{1}/_{8} = eighth finals, QF = quarterfinals, SF = semifinals,
SR = Scratch Race, TR = Tempo Race, ER = Elimination Race, PR = Points Race

== Medal summary ==
=== Medal table ===
Rank	Nation	Gold	Silver	Bronze	Total
1	Netherlands (NED)	5	5	2	12
2	Germany (GER)	4	0	2	6
3	Great Britain (GBR)	2	3	1	6
4	Australia (AUS)	2	2	2	6
5	United States (USA)	2	1	1	4
6	Italy (ITA)	1	1	4	6
7	Belgium (BEL)	1	1	0	2
8	Belarus (BLR)	1	0	0	1
8	Colombia (COL)	1	0	0	1
8	Poland (POL)	1	0	0	1
11	Denmark (DEN)	0	2	1	3
12	Russia (RUS)	0	1	2	3
13	Hong Kong (HKG)	0	1	0	1
13	Japan (JPN)	0	1	0	1
13	Portugal (POR)	0	1	0	1
13	Spain (ESP)	0	1	0	1
17	France (FRA)	0	0	2	2
18	Canada (CAN)	0	0	1	1
18	Lithuania (LTU)	0	0	1	1
18	New Zealand (NZL)	0	0	1	1
Totals (20 entries)		20	20	20	60

=== Medalists ===
Event	Gold	Silver	Bronze
Men's events
Keirin	Fabián Puerta; Colombia	Tomoyuki Kawabata; Japan	Maximilian Levy; Germany
Madison	Germany; Roger Kluge; Theo Reinhardt	Spain; Albert Torres; Sebastián Mora	Australia; Cameron Meyer; Callum Scotson
Omnium	Szymon Sajnok; Poland	Jan-Willem van Schip; Netherlands	Simone Consonni; Italy
Points Race^{[O]}	Cameron Meyer; Australia	Jan-Willem van Schip; Netherlands	Mark Stewart; Great Britain
Pursuit^{[N]}	Filippo Ganna; Italy	Ivo Oliveira; Portugal	Alexander Evtushenko; Russia
Team Pursuit	Great Britain; Ed Clancy; Kian Emadi; Ethan Hayter; Charlie Tanfield	Denmark; Niklas Larsen; Julius Johansen; Frederik Madsen; Casper von Folsach	Italy; Simone Consonni; Liam Bertazzo; Filippo Ganna; Francesco Lamon
Scratch Race^{[O]}	Yauheni Karaliok; Belarus	Michele Scartezzini; Italy	Callum Scotson; Australia
Sprint	Matthew Glaetzer; Australia	Jack Carlin; Great Britain	Sebastien Vigier; France
Team Sprint	Netherlands; Nils van 't Hoenderdaal; Harrie Lavreysen; Jeffrey Hoogland; Matthijs Büchli	Great Britain; Jack Carlin; Ryan Owens; Jason Kenny; Philip Hindes; Joseph Truman	France; François Pervis; Sébastien Vigier; Quentin Lafargue; Michaël D'Almeida
1 km Time Trial^{[N]}	Jeffrey Hoogland; Netherlands	Matthew Glaetzer; Australia	Theo Bos; Netherlands
Women's events
Keirin	Nicky Degrendele; Belgium	Lee Wai Sze; Hong Kong	Simona Krupeckaitė; Lithuania
Madison	Great Britain; Katie Archibald; Emily Nelson	Netherlands; Kirsten Wild; Amy Pieters	Italy; Letizia Paternoster; Maria Giulia Confalonieri
Omnium	Kirsten Wild; Netherlands	Amalie Dideriksen; Denmark	Rushlee Buchanan; New Zealand
Points Race^{[O]}	Kirsten Wild; Netherlands	Jennifer Valente; United States	Jasmin Duehring; Canada
Pursuit^{[N]}	Chloé Dygert; United States	Annemiek van Vleuten; Netherlands	Kelly Catlin; United States
Team Pursuit	United States; Jennifer Valente; Kelly Catlin; Chloé Dygert; Kimberly Geist	Great Britain; Katie Archibald; Elinor Barker; Laura Kenny; Emily Nelson; Ellie Dickinson	Italy; Elisa Balsamo; Letizia Paternoster; Silvia Valsecchi; Tatiana Guderzo; Simona Frapporti
Scratch Race^{[O]}	Kirsten Wild; Netherlands	Jolien D'Hoore; Belgium	Amalie Dideriksen; Denmark
Sprint	Kristina Vogel; Germany	Stephanie Morton; Australia	Pauline Grabosch; Germany
Team Sprint	Germany; Miriam Welte; Kristina Vogel; Pauline Grabosch	Netherlands; Kyra Lamberink; Shanne Braspennincx; Laurine van Riessen; Hetty van de Wouw	Russia; Daria Shmeleva; Anastasia Voynova
500 m Time Trial^{[N]}	Miriam Welte; Germany	Daria Shmeleva; Russia	Elis Ligtlee; Netherlands

=== Notes ===
- Riders named in italics did not participate in the medal finals.
- ^{^{O}} Contested in the Olympics as an intra-omnium discipline only.
- ^{^{N}} Not contested in the Olympics.
