= Miriam Welte =

German cyclist (born 1986)

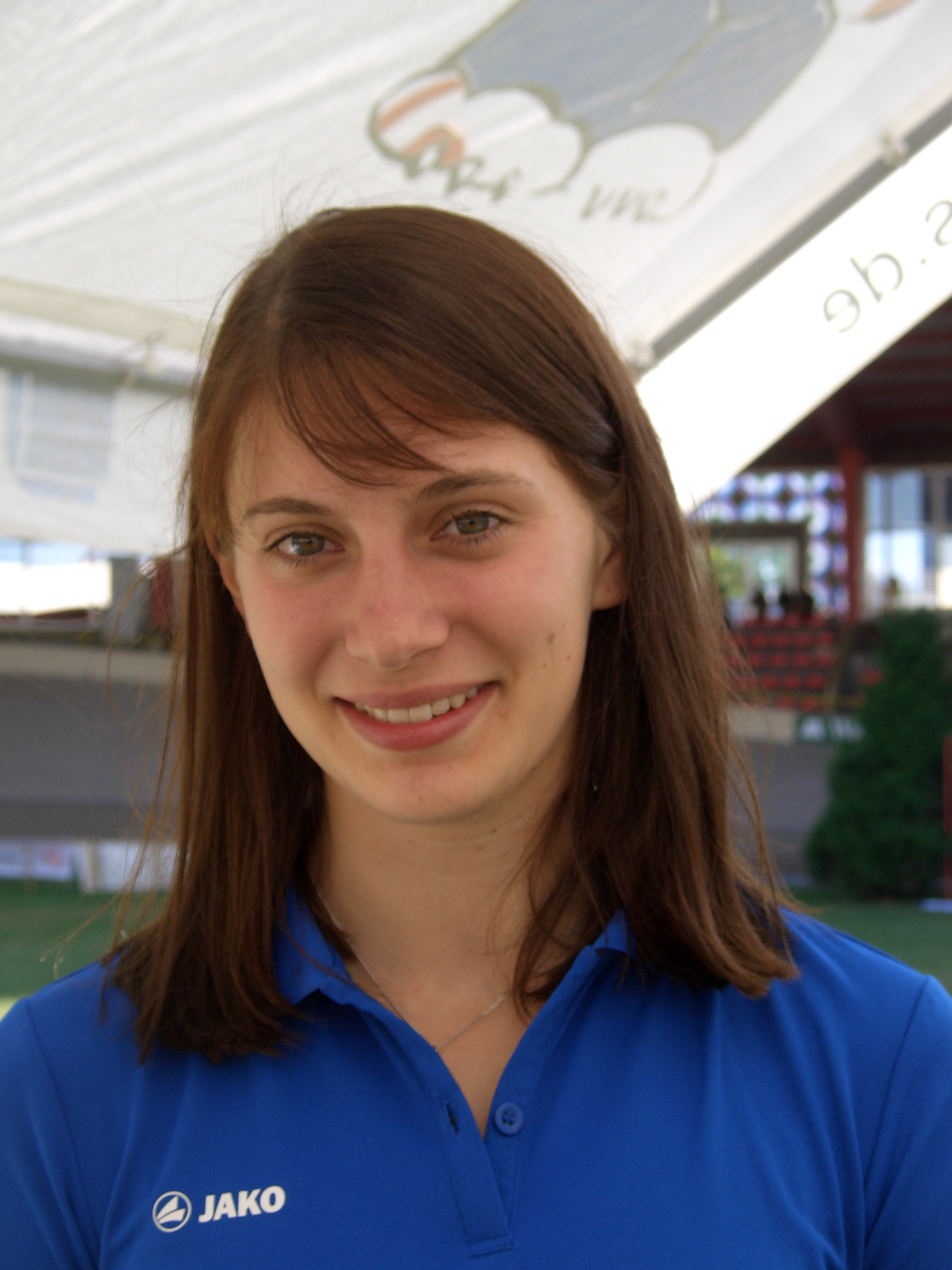

Personal information
- Born: 9 December 1986 (age 39) Kaiserslautern, West Germany
- Height: 1.71 m (5 ft 7 in)
- Weight: 67 kg (148 lb)

Cycling career
- Sport: Cycling
- Discipline: Track
- Role: Rider
- Rider type: Sprinter
Medal record
Women's track cycling
Representing Germany
Olympic Games
Gold medal – first place	2012 London	Team sprint
Bronze medal – third place	2016 Rio de Janeiro	Team sprint
World Championships
Gold medal – first place	2012 Melbourne	Team sprint
Gold medal – first place	2013 Minsk	Team sprint
Gold medal – first place	2014 Cali	Team sprint
Gold medal – first place	2014 Cali	500 m time trial
Gold medal – first place	2018 Apeldoorn	500 m time trial
Gold medal – first place	2018 Apeldoorn	Team sprint
Silver medal – second place	2012 Melbourne	500 m time trial
Silver medal – second place	2013 Minsk	500 m time trial
Silver medal – second place	2017 Hong Kong	500 m time trial
Bronze medal – third place	2011 Apeldoorn	500 m time trial
Bronze medal – third place	2015 Yvelines	500 m time trial
Bronze medal – third place	2016 London	Team sprint
Bronze medal – third place	2017 Hong Kong	Team sprint
Bronze medal – third place	2019 Pruszków	Team sprint
European Championships
Gold medal – first place	2017 Berlin	500 m time trial
Silver medal – second place	2013 Apeldoorn	Team sprint
Silver medal – second place	2014 Baie-Mahault	Team sprint
Silver medal – second place	2015 Grenchen	Team sprint
Silver medal – second place	2017 Berlin	Team sprint
Bronze medal – third place	2011 Apeldoorn	Team sprint
Bronze medal – third place	2014 Baie-Mahault	500 m time trial
Bronze medal – third place	2018 Glasgow	500 m time trial
Bronze medal – third place	2018 Glasgow	Team sprint

Miriam Welte (born 9 December 1986) is a German track cyclist.

== Career ==
At the 2012 UCI Track Cycling World Championships in Melbourne, Welte and Kristina Vogel won the gold medal in the team sprint. They set a world record in qualifying which they broke again in the final.

On 22 June 2012, she set a new world record of 10.643 seconds in the individual sprint event.

At the 2012 Summer Olympics, she and Vogel won the team sprint gold medal.

Welte was trained by her step-father, Frank Ziegler. In 2002, she finished second in the German National Junior 500 m time trial. From 2006 to 2008, she won the senior version of the event.

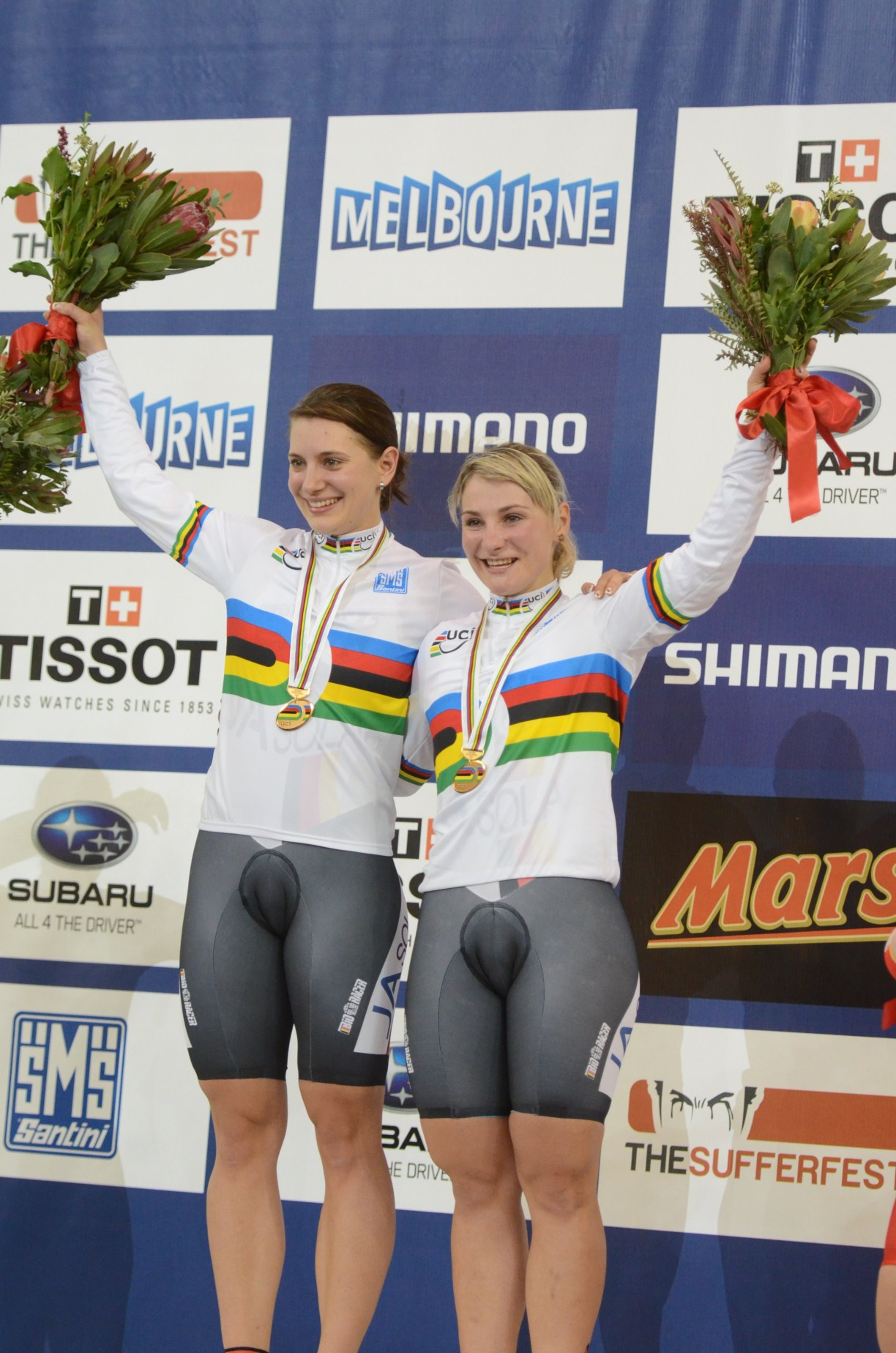
Welte and Vogel on the podium at the 2012 Track World Championships

== Major results ==
2008
UEC European U23 Track Championships

1st Keirin
1st Sprint
2nd 500m Time Trial

2014
1st Keirin, Oberhausen
Dudenhofen

1st Keirin
1st Sprint

1st Team Sprint, Cottbuser Nächte (with Kristina Vogel)
Sprintermeeting

1st Keirin
1st Sprint

UEC European Track Championships

2nd Team Sprint (with Kristina Vogel)
3rd 500m Time Trial

3rd Sprint, Track-Cycling Challenge Grenchen
2015
2nd Team Sprint, UEC European Track Championships (with Kristina Vogel)
Internationale Radsport Meeting

2nd 500m Time Trial
3rd Keirin
3rd Sprint

2nd Keirin, Cottbuser Nächte
3rd Team Sprint, GP von Deutschland im Sprint (with Kristina Vogel)
2016
GP von Deutschland im Sprint

1st Team Sprint (with Kristina Vogel)
3rd Sprint

2nd Sprint, Track-Cycling Challenge Grenchen
Cottbuser SprintCup

2nd 500m Time Trial
3rd Sprint

3rd Team Sprint, UCI World Track Championships

2017
UEC European Track Championships

1st 500m Time Trial
2nd Team Sprint (with Kristina Vogel)

GP von Deutschland im Sprint

1st Team Sprint (with Pauline Grabosch)
2nd Keirin

Siberne Eule von Ludwigshafen

1st Sprint
2nd Keirin

TROFEU CIUTAT DE BARCELONA-Memorial Miquel Poblet

1st Sprint
2nd Keirin

Track Cycling Challenge

1st Keirin
1st Sprint

UCI World Track Championships

2nd 500m Time Trial
3rd Team Sprint (with Kristina Vogel)

2nd Sprint, Dudenhofen
