= Hetty van de Wouw =

Dutch cyclist (born 1998)

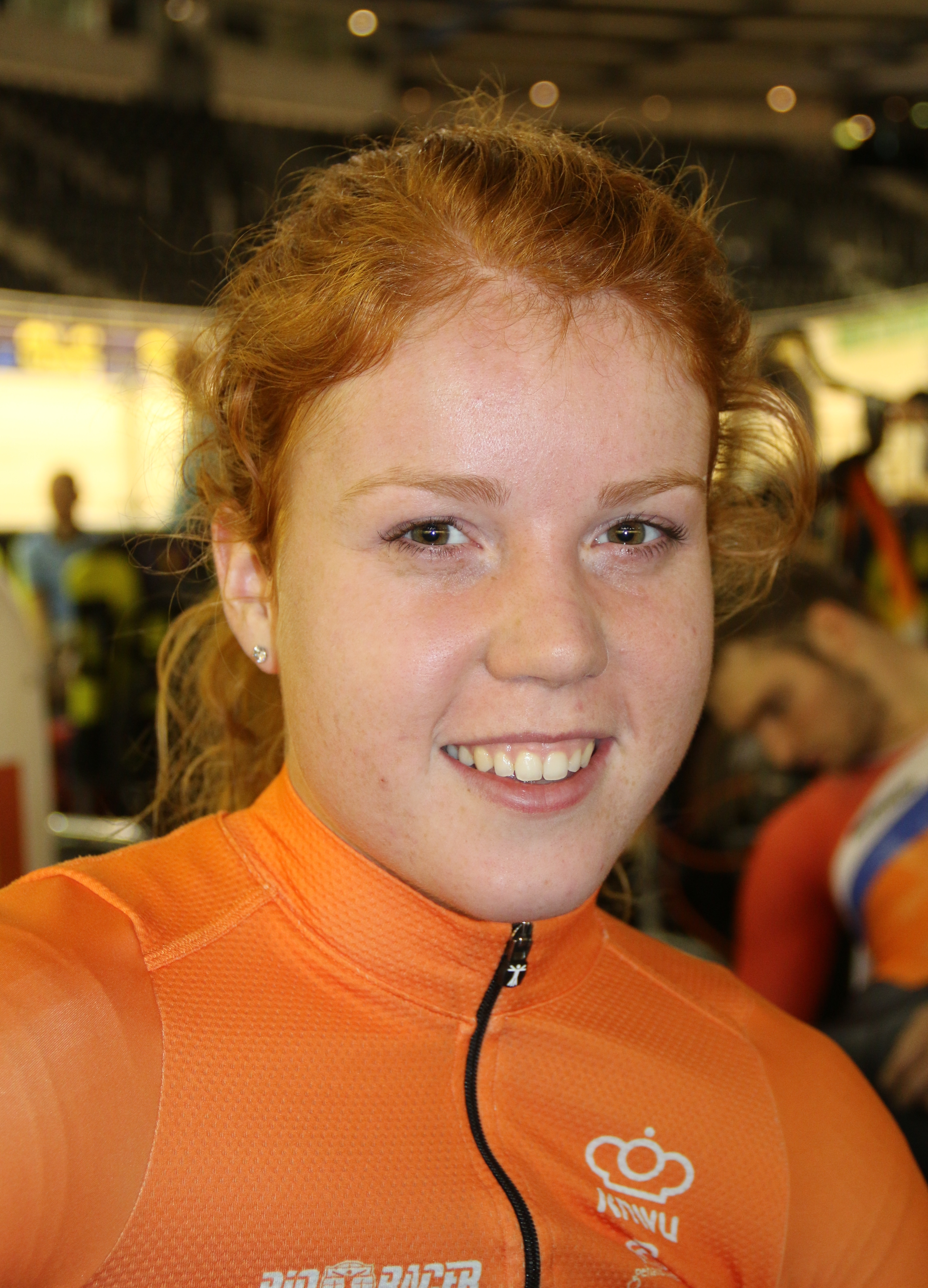
- Hetty van de Wouw (2017)

Personal information
- Born: 29 May 1998 (age 28) Kaatsheuvel, Netherlands

Cycling career
- Sport: Cycling
- Discipline: Track cycling
- Rider type: Sprinter
Medal record
Women's track cycling
Representing the Netherlands
Olympic Games
Silver medal – second place	2024 Paris	Keirin
World Championships
Gold medal – first place	2025 Santiago	Sprint
Gold medal – first place	2025 Santiago	1 km time trial
Gold medal – first place	2025 Santiago	Team sprint
Silver medal – second place	2018 Apeldoorn	Team sprint
Silver medal – second place	2024 Ballerup	Sprint
Silver medal – second place	2024 Ballerup	Keirin
Silver medal – second place	2024 Ballerup	Team sprint
Silver medal – second place	2026 Shanghai	1 km time trial
European Games
Bronze medal – third place	2019 Minsk	Team sprint
European Championships
Gold medal – first place	2021 Grenchen	Team sprint
Gold medal – first place	2025 Heusden-Zolder	1 km time trial
Gold medal – first place	2025 Heusden-Zolder	Team sprint
Silver medal – second place	2022 Munich	Team sprint
Bronze medal – third place	2017 Berlin	Team sprint
Bronze medal – third place	2023 Grenchen	500 m time trial
Bronze medal – third place	2023 Grenchen	Team sprint
Bronze medal – third place	2024 Apeldoorn	Keirin
Bronze medal – third place	2024 Apeldoorn	Team sprint
Bronze medal – third place	2025 Heusden-Zolder	Keirin
Bronze medal – third place	2026 Konya	Team sprint

Hetty van de Wouw (born 29 May 1998) is a Dutch female track cyclist, representing Netherlands at international competitions. On 15 February 2025 she set a world record for the 1 km time trial.

== Major results ==
2014
1st Gent Junior Keirin
1st 500m time trial, National Track Junior Championships

2015
2nd Gent Junior Keirin
European Track Junior Championships

3rd 500m time trial
3rd Scratch race

2016
European Track Junior Championships

1st Team sprint
2nd Individual sprint
2nd 500m time trial

1st Keirin, National Track Championships
1st Dudenhofen Junior Individual sprint
1st Cottbus Junior Individual sprint
1st Oberhausen Junior Individual sprint
2nd Öschelbronn Junior Individual sprint
3rd Individual sprint, UCI Junior World Championships

2017
3rd Team sprint, European Track Championships
1st Keirin, Six Days of Rotterdam
2nd Team Sprint, Fastest Man on Wheels (with Kyra Lamberink)

2018
2nd Team sprint, UCI World Championships

2019
3rd Team sprint, European Games

2021
1st Team sprint, UEC European Championships

2022
2nd Team sprint, UEC European Championships

2023
UEC European Championships

3rd 500 m time trial
3rd Team sprint

2024
2nd Keirin, Olympic Games
UCI World Championships

2nd Team sprint
2nd Sprint
2nd Keirin

UEC European Championships

3rd Keirin
3rd Team sprint

2025
UCI World Championships

1st Team sprint
1st Sprint
1st 1 km time trial

UEC European Championships

1st Team sprint
1st 1 km time trial
3rd Keirin

2026
UEC European Championships

3rd Team sprint
