= Shanne Braspennincx =

Dutch cyclist (born 1991)

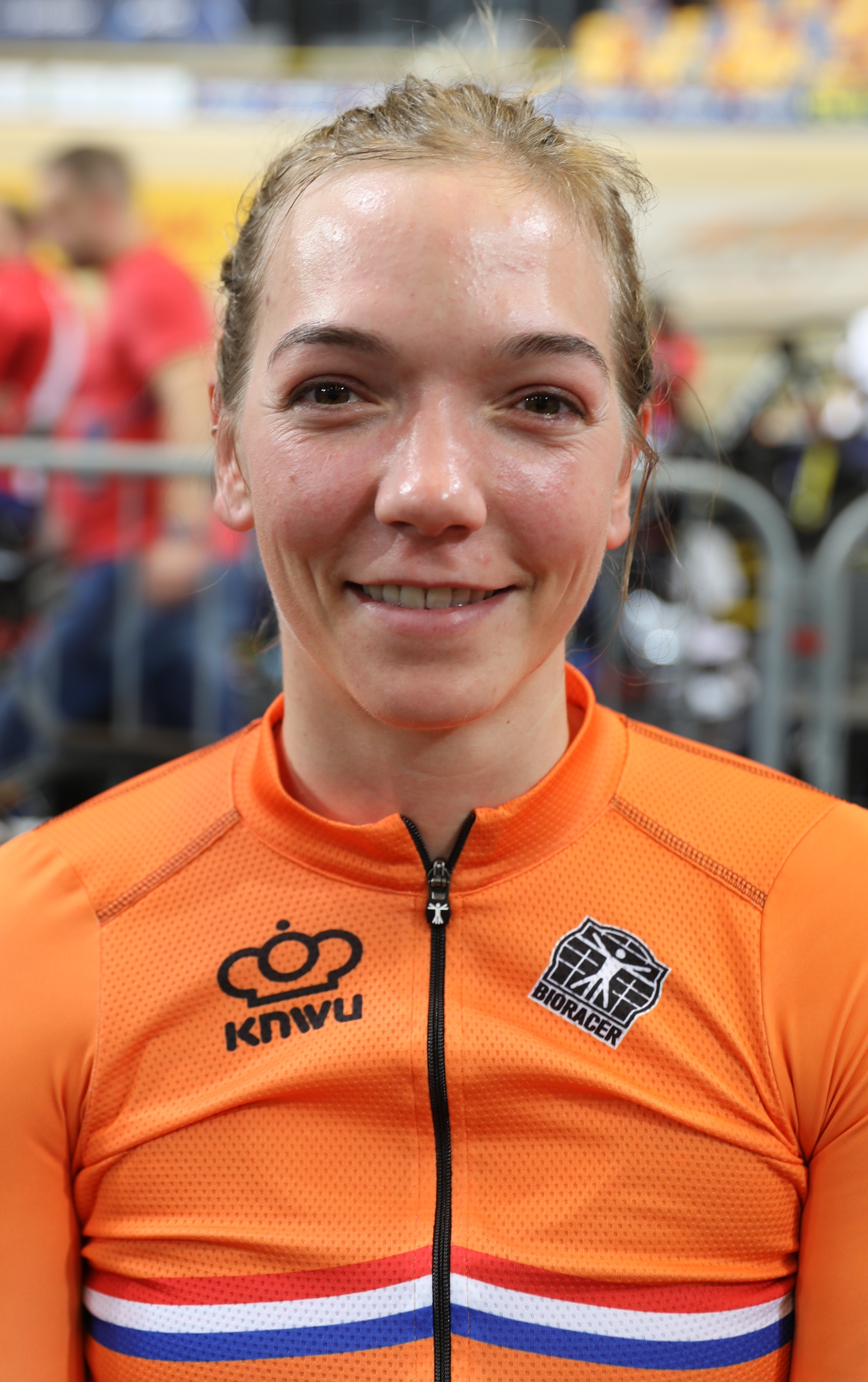
- Braspennincx in 2019

Personal information
- Born: 18 May 1991 (age 35) Turnhout, Belgium

Cycling career
- Sport: Cycling
- Discipline: Track cycling
- Rider type: Sprinter
Medal record
Women's track cycling
Representing the Netherlands
Olympic Games
Gold medal – first place	2020 Tokyo	Keirin
World Championships
Silver medal – second place	2015 Yvelines	Keirin
Silver medal – second place	2018 Apeldoorn	Team sprint
European Games
Silver medal – second place	2019 Minsk	Keirin
Bronze medal – third place	2019 Minsk	Team sprint
European Championships
Gold medal – first place	2021 Grenchen	Sprint
Gold medal – first place	2021 Grenchen	Team sprint
Silver medal – second place	2022 Munich	Team sprint
Bronze medal – third place	2014 Baie-Mahault	Keirin
Bronze medal – third place	2014 Baie-Mahault	Team sprint
Bronze medal – third place	2017 Berlin	Team sprint
Bronze medal – third place	2019 Apeldoorn	Team sprint

Shanne Braspennincx (born 18 May 1991) is a Dutch track cyclist. She competed at the 2014 and 2015 UCI Track Cycling World Championships. She won the gold medal in the keirin race at the 2020 Summer Olympics.

== Career results ==
2012
3rd Team Sprint, UEC European U23 Track Championships (with Yesna Rijkhoff)
2013
Grand Prix Sprint Apeldoorn

1st Keirin
1st Sprint

UEC European U23 Track Championships

1st Keirin
1st Team Sprint (with Elis Ligtlee)

2014
1st Keirin, Singen
1st Sprint, US Sprint GP
Fastest Man on Wheels

1st Keirin
1st Scratch Race

1st Keirin, Festival of Speed
2nd Keirin, Revolution – Round 4, Manchester
2nd Keirin, Oberhausen
2nd Sprint, Champions of Sprint
2nd Team Sprint, Cottbuser Nächte (with Elis Ligtlee)
Open des Nations sur Piste de Roubaix

2nd Team Sprint (with Elis Ligtlee)
3rd Keirin

UEC European Track Championships

3rd Keirin
3rd Team Sprint (with Elis Ligtlee)

3rd Keirin, Revolution – Round 3, Manchester
3rd Sprint, Öschelbronn
3rd Sprint, Dudenhofen
2015
2nd Keirin, UCI World Track Cycling Championships
Revolution

2nd Keirin – Round 3, Manchester
3rd Sprint – Round 3, Manchester

Independence Day Grand Prix

2nd Sprint
2nd 500m Time Trial
3rd Keirin

2nd Sprint, Grand Prix of Colorado Springs
3rd Keirin, Festival of Speed
2016
3rd Keirin, Grand Prix of Poland
2017
1st Keirin, Fastest Man on Wheels
2nd Internationaal Baan Sprint Keirin Toernooi
3rd Team Sprint, UEC European Track Championships (with Kyra Lamberink)
3rd Keirin, Six Days of Rotterdam
3rd Sprint, Belgian International Track Meeting
2021
1st Keirin, Olympic Games
