= Nikola Sibiak =

Polish track cyclist (born 2000)

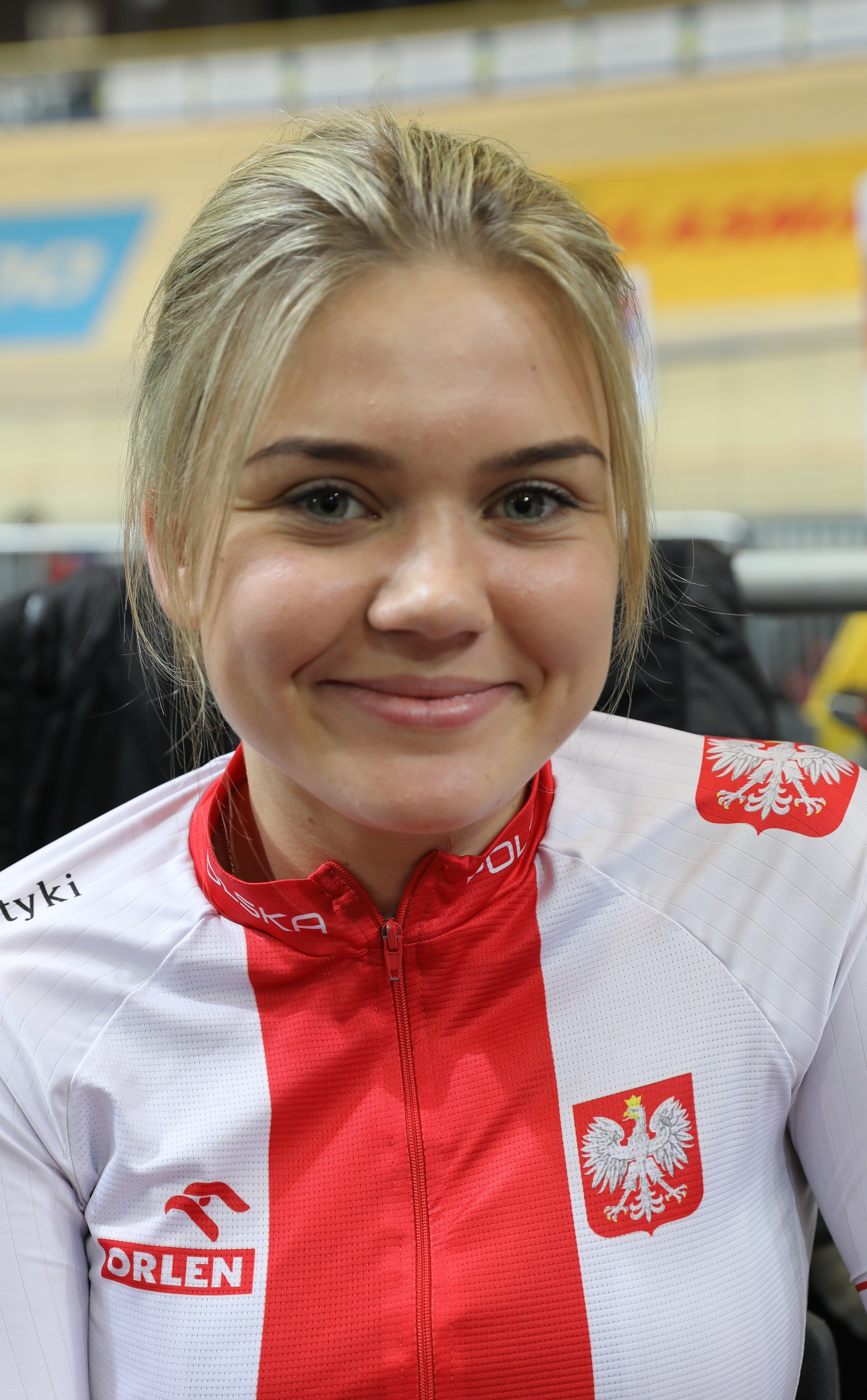
- Sibiak in 2019

Personal information
- Born: 21 June 2000 (age 26) Darłowo, Poland

Cycling career
- Sport: Cycling
- Discipline: Track
- Role: Rider
Medal record
Women's track cycling
Representing Poland
European Championships
Bronze medal – third place	2022 Munich	Team sprint
Junior World Championships
Bronze medal – third place	2018 Aigle	Sprint
Bronze medal – third place	2018 Aigle	Team sprint
Silver medal – second place	2018 Aigle	Keirin
U23 & Junior European Championships
Bronze medal – third place	2020 Fiorenzuola d'Arda	Team sprint
Silver medal – second place	2020 Fiorenzuola d'Arda	Keirin

Nikola Sibiak (born 21 June 2000) is a Polish track cyclist. She competed at the 2018 UCI Junior Track Cycling World Championships, winning two bronze medals and a silver medal in the sprint, team sprint and keirin events. She also competed at the 2020 UEC European Track Championships, winning a bronze and silver medal in the team sprint and keirin events. She competed at the 2021 UCI Track Cycling World Championships.
