= Pauline Grabosch =

German track cyclist (born 1998)

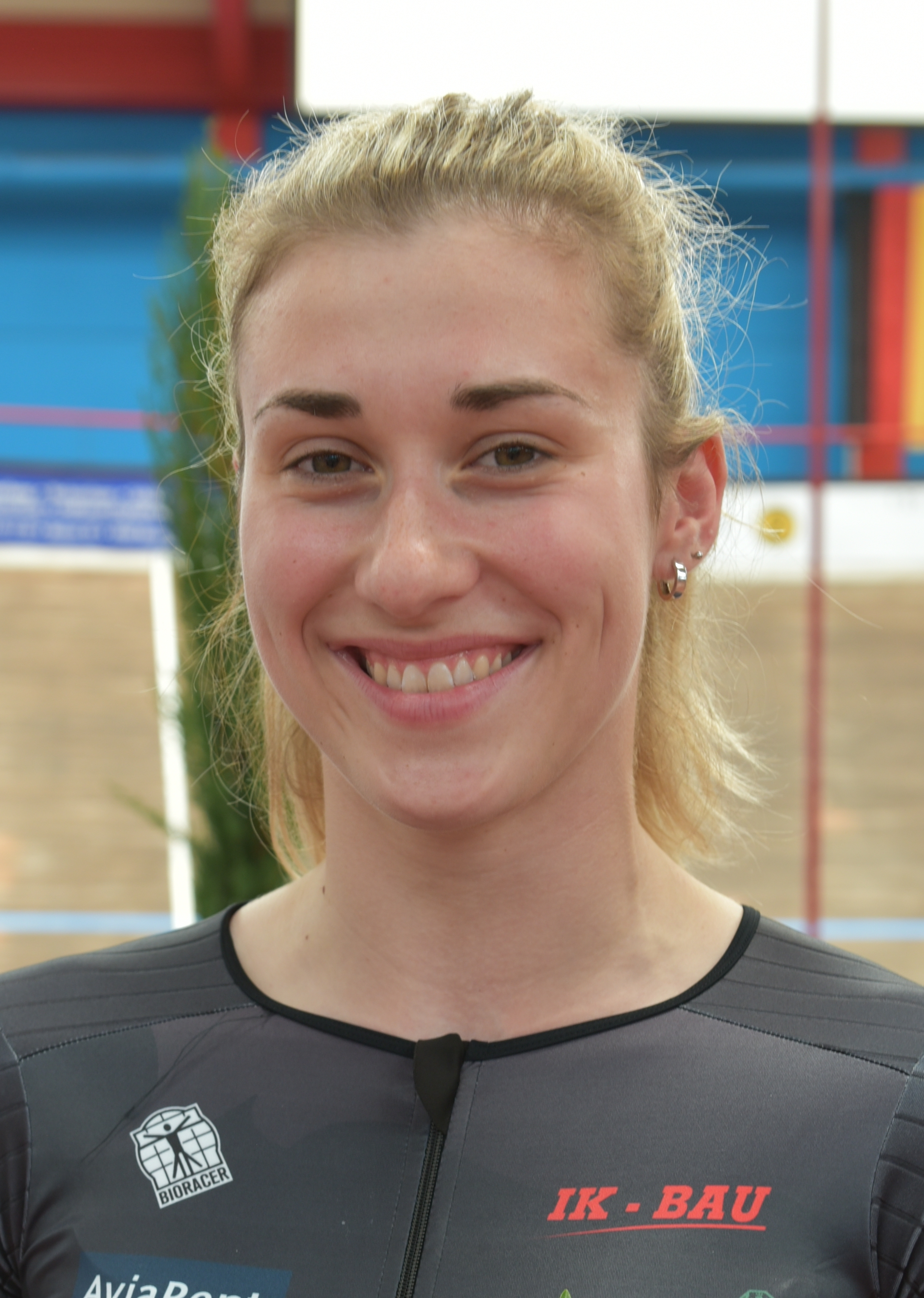
- Grabosch in 2022

Personal information
- Full name: Pauline Sophie Grabosch
- Born: 14 January 1998 (age 28) Magdeburg, Germany
- Height: 1.76 m (5 ft 9 in)
- Weight: 77 kg (170 lb)

Cycling career
- Sport: Cycling
- Discipline: Track cycling
- Role: Rider
- Rider type: Sprinter
Medal record
Women's track cycling
Representing Germany
Olympic Games
Bronze medal – third place	2024 Paris	Team sprint
World Championships
Gold medal – first place	2018 Apeldoorn	Team sprint
Gold medal – first place	2020 Berlin	Team sprint
Gold medal – first place	2021 Roubaix	Team sprint
Gold medal – first place	2022 Saint-Quentin-en-Yvelines	Team sprint
Gold medal – first place	2023 Glasgow	Team sprint
Gold medal – first place	2026 Shanghai	1 km time trial
Bronze medal – third place	2018 Apeldoorn	Sprint
Bronze medal – third place	2026 Shanghai	Team sprint
European Championships
Gold medal – first place	2022 Munich	Team sprint
Gold medal – first place	2023 Grenchen	Team sprint
Gold medal – first place	2024 Apeldoorn	Team sprint
Gold medal – first place	2026 Konya	Team sprint
Silver medal – second place	2016 Yvelines	500 m time trial
Silver medal – second place	2017 Berlin	500 m time trial
Silver medal – second place	2017 Berlin	Team sprint
Silver medal – second place	2021 Grenchen	500 m time trial
Silver medal – second place	2021 Grenchen	Team sprint
Silver medal – second place	2023 Grenchen	Sprint
Bronze medal – third place	2024 Apeldoorn	500 m time trial
Bronze medal – third place	2025 Heusden-Zolder	Team sprint

Pauline Sophie Grabosch (born 14 January 1998) is a German track cyclist, representing Germany at international competitions. She won the a Bronze medal in the Women's Team Sprint at the 2024 Paris Olympics. She won the silver medal at the 2016 UEC European Track Championships in the 500m time trial.

== Major results ==
2016
3rd Team Sprint, Memorial of Alexander Lesnikov (with Emma Hinze)
3rd Team Sprint, Grand Prix of Tula (with Emma Hinze)
2017
GP von Deutschland im Sprint

1st Keirin
1st Team Sprint (with Miriam Welte
3rd Sprint

2nd 500m Time Trial, UEC European Track Championships
2nd Sprint, Cottbuser SprintCup
