= Kyra Lamberink =

Dutch cyclist (born 1996)

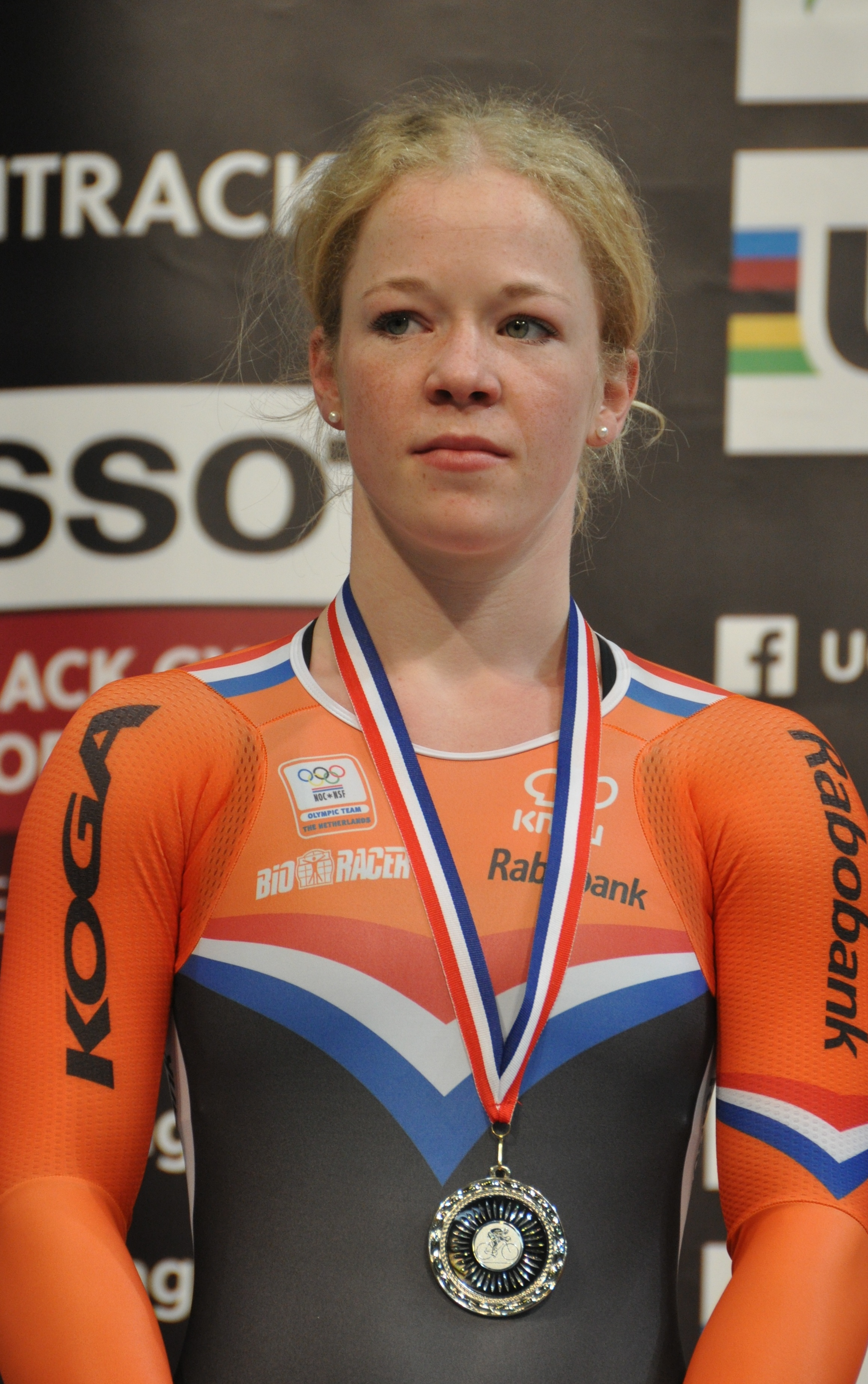
- Lamberink in 2016

Personal information
- Full name: Kyra Lamberink
- Born: 15 April 1996 (age 30) Bergentheim, Netherlands

Cycling career
- Sport: Cycling
- Discipline: Track cycling
Medal record
Women's track cycling
Representing the Netherlands
World Championships
Silver medal – second place	2018 Apeldoorn	Team sprint
Silver medal – second place	2024 Ballerup	Team sprint
European Games
Bronze medal – third place	2019 Minsk	Team sprint
European Championships
Gold medal – first place	2021 Grenchen	Team sprint
Silver medal – second place	2022 Munich	Team sprint
Bronze medal – third place	2017 Berlin	Team sprint
Bronze medal – third place	2019 Apeldoorn	Team sprint
Bronze medal – third place	2023 Grenchen	Team sprint
Bronze medal – third place	2024 Apeldoorn	Team sprint

Kyra Lamberink (born 15 April 1996) is a Dutch track cyclist, representing Netherlands at international competitions. As a junior, she won the bronze medal at the 2013 European Track Championships (under-23 & junior). She competed at the 2016 UEC European Track Championships finishing fourth in the team sprint event and eight in the 500m time trial event.

== Career results ==
2014
2nd Sprint, Belgian Xmas Meetings

2015
Milton International Challenge

2nd Team sprint (with Yesna Rijkhoff)
3rd Keirin

2nd Sprint, Belgian Xmas Meetings
3rd Keirin, Revolution - Round 4, Glasgow
3rd Team sprint, UEC European U23 Championships (with Elis Ligtlee)

2016
1st Team Sprint, UEC European U23 Track Championships (with Elis Ligtlee)

2017
2nd Team sprint, Fastest Man on Wheels (with Hetty van de Wouw)
3rd Team sprint, UEC European Championships (with Shanne Braspennincx)
3rd Keirin, US Sprint GP

2018
2nd Team sprint, UCI World Championships

2019
3rd Team sprint, UEC European Championships
3rd Team sprint, European Games

2021
1st Team sprint, UEC European Championships

2022
2nd Team sprint, UEC European Championships

2023
3rd Team sprint, UEC European Championships

2024
2nd Team sprint, UCI World Championships
3rd Team sprint, UEC European Championships
