= Mathilde Gros =

French cyclist (born 1999)

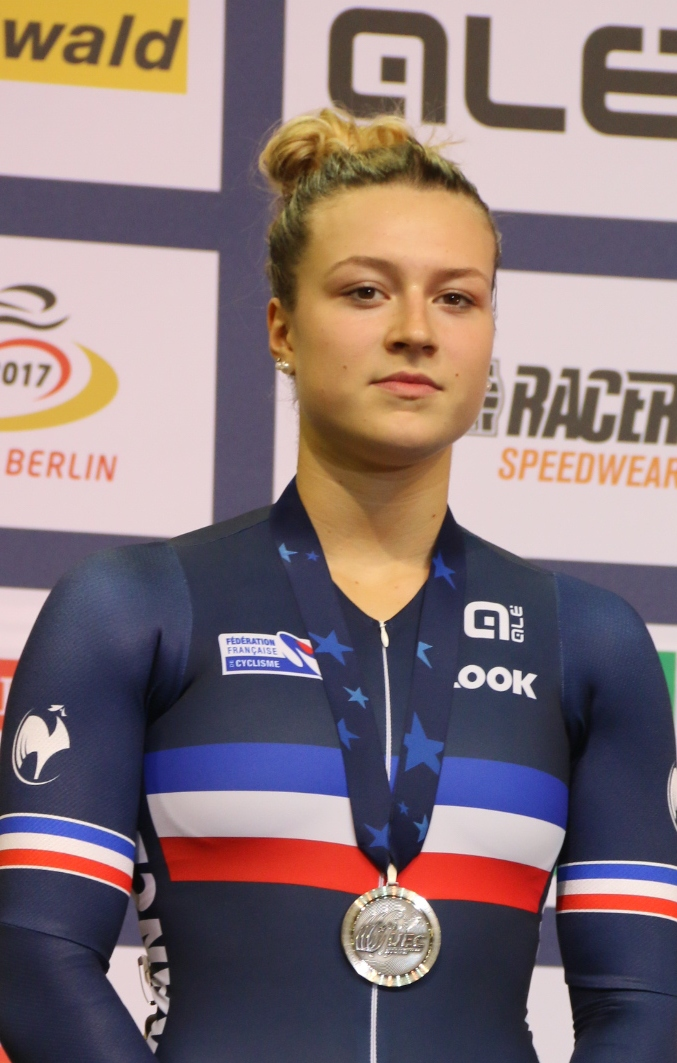
- Gros in 2017

Personal information
- Born: 27 April 1999 (age 27) Sainte-Catherine, France
- Height: 1.75 m (5 ft 9 in)

Cycling career
- Sport: Cycling
- Discipline: Track cycling
- Role: Rider
Medal record
Women's track cycling
Representing France
World Championships
Gold medal – first place	2022 Saint-Quentin-en-Yvelines	Sprint
Bronze medal – third place	2019 Pruszków	Sprint
European Games
Silver medal – second place	2019 Minsk	Sprint
European Championships
Gold medal – first place	2018 Glasgow	Keirin
Gold medal – first place	2019 Apeldoorn	Keirin
Gold medal – first place	2026 Konya	1 km time trial
Silver medal – second place	2017 Berlin	Sprint
Silver medal – second place	2022 Munich	Sprint
Silver medal – second place	2026 Konya	Keirin
Bronze medal – third place	2018 Glasgow	Sprint
Bronze medal – third place	2021 Grenchen	Sprint

Mathilde Gros (born 27 April 1999) is a French racing cyclist. She rode in the women's sprint event at the 2018 UCI Track Cycling World Championships.

She is a student at Emlyon Business School.
