= Marlena Karwacka =

Polish cyclist (born 1997)

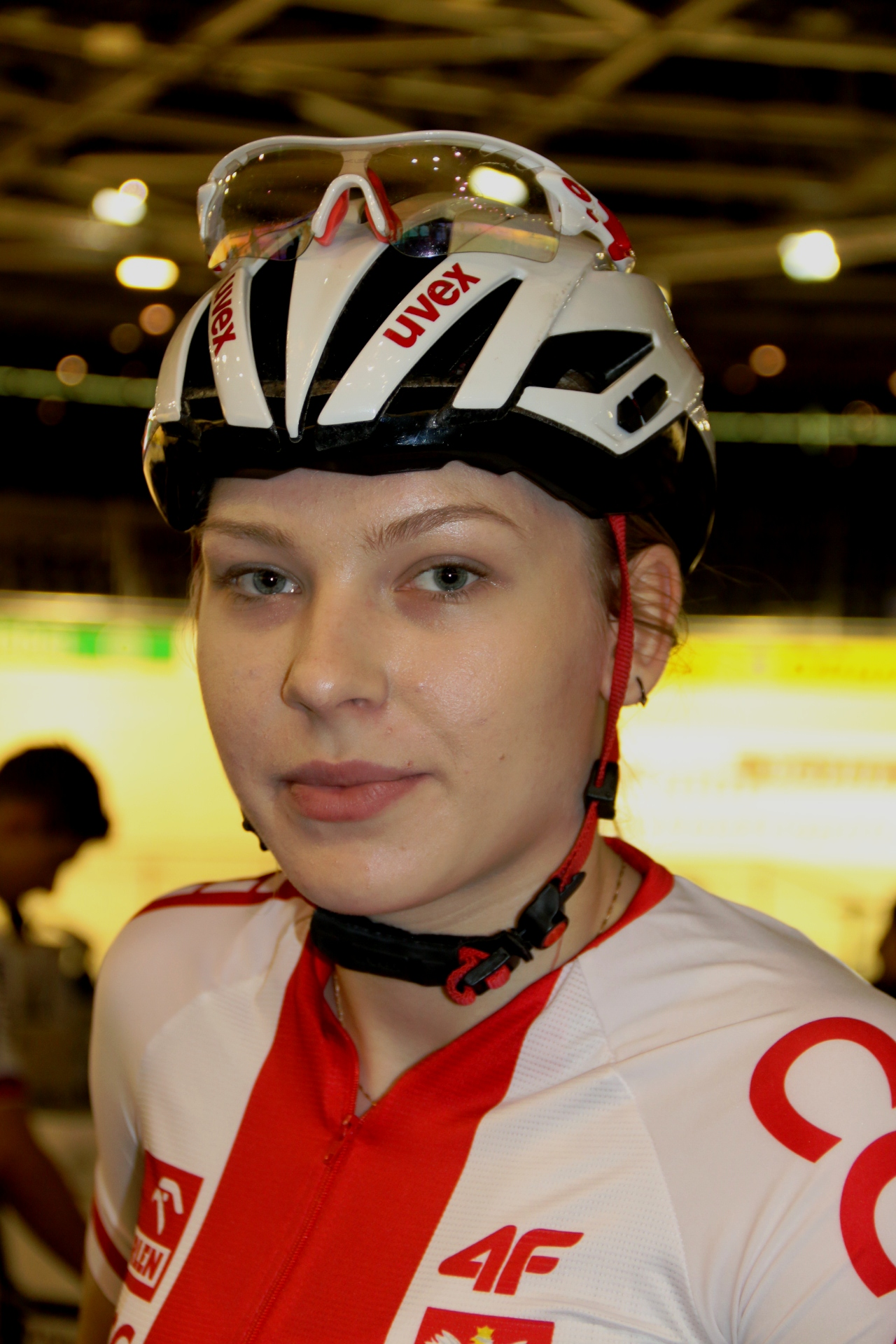

Personal information
- Born: 20 February 1997 (age 29) Sławno, Poland

Cycling career
- Sport: Cycling
- Role: Rider
Medal record
Women's track cycling
Representing Poland
European Championships
| Bronze medal – third place | 2022 Munich | Team sprint |

Marlena Karwacka (born 20 February 1997) is a Polish racing cyclist. She rode in the women's team sprint event at the 2018 UCI Track Cycling World Championships.
