= Urszula Łoś =

Polish cyclist (born 1994)

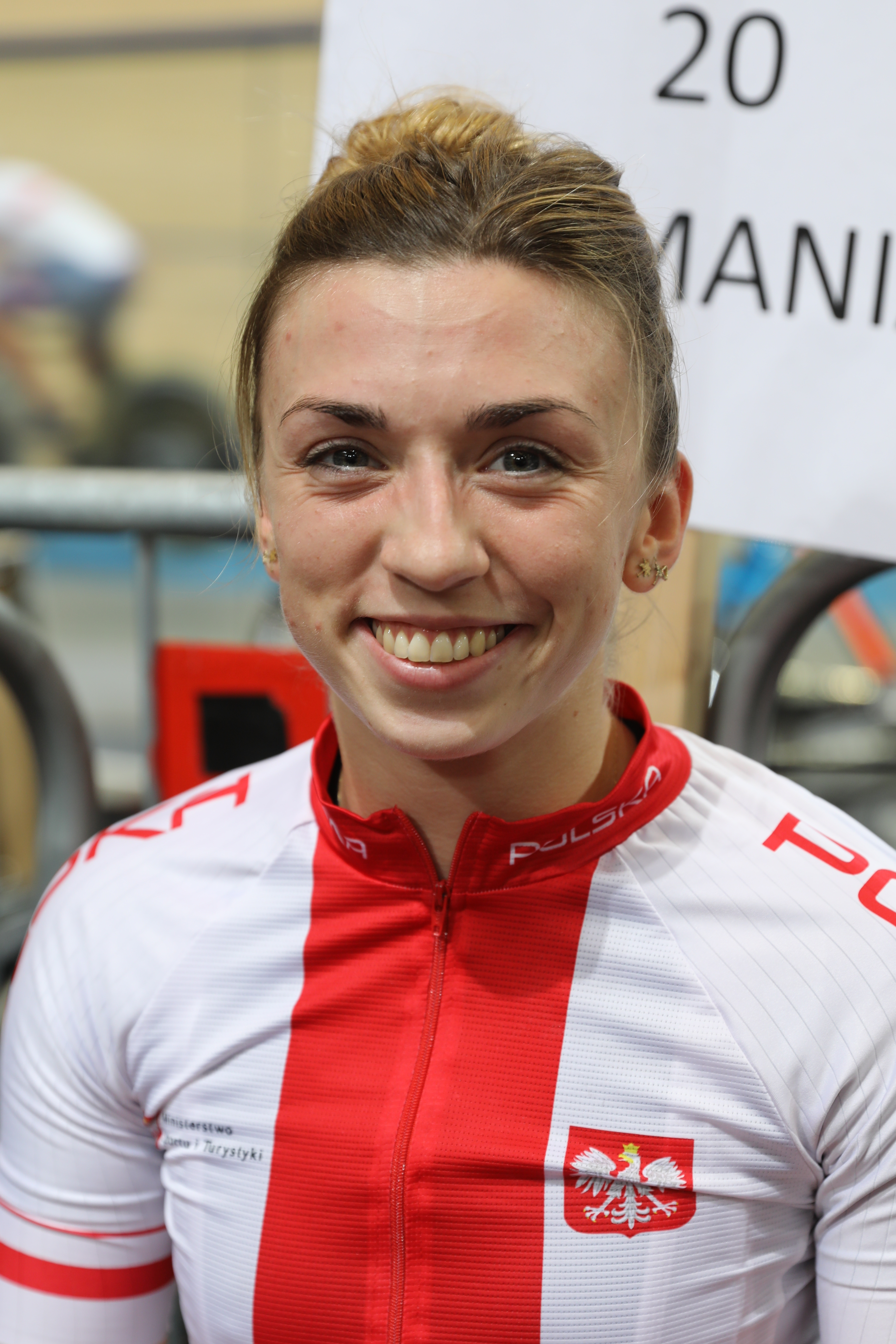
- Urszula Łoś at 2019 UEC Track Elite European Championships

Personal information
- Born: 18 February 1994 (age 32) Pruszków, Poland
- Height: 1.68 m (5 ft 6 in)
- Weight: 57 kg (126 lb)

Cycling career
- Sport: Cycling
- Discipline: Track cycling
- Role: Rider
- Rider type: Sprinter
Medal record
Women's track cycling
Representing Poland
European Championships
| Silver medal – second place | 2022 Munich | Keirin |
| Bronze medal – third place | 2022 Munich | Team sprint |

Urszula Łoś (born 18 February 1994) is a Polish professional track cyclist who specializes in short-term disciplines. She won a bronze medal in women's keirin at the 2018 UCI Track Cycling World Championships in London, United Kingdom. In 2019, together with her teammate Marlena Karwacka, she won a silver medal in women's team sprint event at 2019–20 UCI Track Cycling World Cup in Cambridge, New Zealand and a week later, they won a gold medal in the same competition at 2019–20 UCI Track Cycling World Cups in Brisbane, Australia. In the last event of 2019–20 UCI Track Cycling World Cup held in Milton, Canada the cyclists won a silver medal again, thereby winning the entire World Cup classification in women's team sprint.
