= 2026 UCI Track World Cup =

2026 track cycling series

- Sixth edition of the UCI Track Cycling Nations Cup

Details
- Dates: 6 March – 26 April 2026
- Location: Australia; Hong Kong; Malaysia
- Races: 3

The 2026 UCI Track World Cup (also known as the 2026 Tissot UCI Track World Cup for sponsorship reasons) was a multi-race tournament over a track cycling season. It was the sixth series of the UCI Track Cycling Nations Cup organised by the UCI, and the first to be rebranded to UCI Track World Cup.

== Series ==
3 rounds were scheduled:

Date	Location
6–8 March	Perth, Australia
17–19 April	Hong Kong, China
24–26 April	Nilai, Malaysia

== Standings ==
=== Men ===
Sprint

Rank	after 3 rounds	Points
1	(United Kingdom) Matthew Richardson	1600
2	(Netherlands) Harrie Lavreysen	1360
3	(Australia) Leigh Hoffman	1360
4	(Trinidad and Tobago) Nicholas Paul	1320
5	(Malaysia) Azizulhasni Awang	1280

Keirin

Rank	after 3 rounds	Points
1	(Malaysia) Azizulhasni Awang	1600
2	(Netherlands) Harrie Lavreysen	1520
3	(United Kingdom) Matthew Richardson	1120
4	(Australia) Leigh Hoffman	1120
5	(Individual Neutral Athletes) Nikita Kiriltsev	1080

Omnium

Rank	after 3 rounds	Points
1	(China) Wu Junjie	952
2	(Slovenia) Nejc Peterlin	864
3	(Japan) Naoki Kojima	800
4	(Netherlands) Philip Heijnen	800
5	(Japan) Shunsuke Imamura	800

Elimination Race

Rank	after 3 rounds	Points
1	(Italy) Matteo Fiorin	1600
2	(Individual Neutral Athletes) Ilya Savekin	1280
3	(Spain) Alvaro Navas	1048
4	(Turkey) Ramazan Yılmaz	1000
5	(Germany) Moritz Augenstein	800

Team Sprint

Rank	after 3 rounds	Points
1	China	2760
2	Italy	2040
3	Netherlands	2040
4	France	1860
5	Czechia	1680

Team Pursuit

Rank	after 3 rounds	Points
1	China	2880
2	New Zealand	2720
3	Hong Kong, China	2720
4	France	2560
5	Indonesia	2320

Madison

Rank	after 3 rounds	Points
1	Germany	3920
2	Netherlands	2880
3	Japan	2784
4	New Zealand	2560
5	China	2544

=== Women ===
Sprint

Rank	after 3 rounds	Points
1	(United Kingdom) Emma Finucane	1600
2	(China) Yuan Liying	1440
3	(Netherlands) Hetty van de Wouw	1360
4	(Japan) Mina Sato	1320
5	(New Zealand) Ellesse Andrews	1200

Keirin

Rank	after 3 rounds	Points
1	(China) Wang Lijuan	2000
2	(China) Yuan Liying	1440
3	(United Kingdom) Emma Finucane	1280
4	(Individual Neutral Athletes) Iana Burlakova	1200
5	(Colombia) Stefany Cuadrado	1160

Omnium

Rank	after 3 rounds	Points
1	(Norway) Anita Stenberg	2160
2	(Mexico) Yareli Acevedo	1720
3	(Japan) Tsuyaka Uchino	1520
4	(Hong Kong) Lee Sze Wing	1224
5	(Czech Republic) Petra Sevcikova	784

Elimination Race

Rank	after 3 rounds	Points
1	(Norway) Anita Stenberg	2320
2	(Hong Kong) Lee Sze Wing	1840
3	(Mexico) Yareli Acevedo	1600
4	(Individual Neutral Athletes) Valeriya Valgonen	1040
5	(Uzbekistan) Nafosat Kozieva	856

Team Sprint

Rank	after 3 rounds	Points
1	China	3600
2	Netherlands	2040
3	Australia	1860
4	Mexico	1800
5	Poland	1680

Team Pursuit

Rank	after 3 rounds	Points
1	New Zealand	3200
2	China	2640
3	Germany	2240
4	Japan	1840
5	Italy	1760

Madison

Rank	after 3 rounds	Points
1	Japan	3600
2	Netherlands	2880
3	Hong Kong, China	2736
4	France	2560
5	New Zealand	2480

== Overall team standings ==
Overall team standings are calculated based on total number of points gained by the team's riders in each event.

Rank	Team	(Australia)	(Hong Kong)	(Malaysia)	Total Points
1	China	8536	10344	10329	29209
2	Japan	7104	11401	6417	24922
3	Netherlands	–	9884	13000	21819
4	Australia	14452	5494	–	19946
5	Germany	8968	4979	5986	19933
6	New Zealand	1888	9259	7922	19069
7	France	–	10903	7052	17955
8	Germany	–	7336	8892	16228
9	Great Britain	1520	13105	1440	16065
10	Hong Kong, China	6472	5256	3378	15106

== Results ==
=== Men ===
Event	Winner	Second	Third
Australia, Perth (Perth SpeedDome) | 6–8 March
Sprint [ Details]	Matthew Richardson (GBR)	Leigh Hoffman (AUS)	Azizulhasni Awang (MAS)
Keirin [ Details]	Azizulhasni Awang (MAS)	Matthew Richardson (GBR)	Leigh Hoffman (AUS)
Omnium [ Details]	Shunsuke Imamura (JPN)	Wu Junjie (CHN)	Graeme Frislie (USA)
Elimination Race [ Details]	Moritz Augenstein (GER)	Thomas Cornish (AUS)	Raphael Kokas (AUT)
Team Sprint [ Details]	Germany; Maximilian Dornbach; Nik Schroter; Luca Spiegel	Czechia; David Peterka; Adam Rauschgold; Dominik Topinka	China; Jin Zhiheng; Li Zhiwei; Xie Han
Team Pursuit [ Details]	Australia; Noah Blannin; Thomas Cornish; Joshua Duffy; Liam Walsh; Conor Leahy	Hong Kong, China; Ma Yik Fei; Mow Ching Yin; Ng Pak Hang; Tso Kai Kwong; Chu Tsun Wai	Chinese Taipei; Tu Chih-hao; Chang Chih-sheng; Li Jing-feng; Xu Shi-ru; Chien Yun-tse
Madison [ Details]	Germany; Moritz Augenstein; Roger Kluge	Australia; Conor Leahy; Liam Walsh	Austria; Raphael Kokas; Maximilian Schmidbauer
Hong Kong, Hong Kong (Hong Kong Velodrome) | 17-19 April
Sprint [ Details]	Matthew Richardson (GBR)	Kaiya Ota (JPN)	Leigh Hoffman (AUS)
Keirin [ Details]	Harrie Lavreysen (NED)	Kaiya Ota (JPN)	Shinji Nakano (JPN)
Omnium [ Details]	Philip Heijnen (NED)	Kazushige Kuboki (JPN)	Matthew Bostock (GBR)
Elimination Race [ Details]	Matteo Fiorin (ITA)	Thomas Sexton (NZL)	Yoeri Havik (NED)
Team Sprint [ Details]	Great Britain; Harry Ledingham-Horn; Matthew Richardson; Joseph Truman	Netherlands; Harrie Lavreysen; Roy van den Berg; Tijmen van Loon	France; Timmy Gillion; Rayan Helal; Etienne Oliviero
Team Pursuit [ Details]	New Zealand; Marshall Erwood; George Jackson; Nicholas Kergozou de la Boessiere; Daniel Morton; Keegan Hornblow	Denmark; Frederik Madsen; Thor Nielsen; Robin Skivild; Oskar Winkler	China; Li Ni; Pei Zhengyu; Sun Haijiao; Wu Junjie
Madison [ Details]	Netherlands; Yoeri Havik; Philip Heijnen	France; Erwan Besnier; Donavan Grondin	Great Britain; Logan Maclean; William Perrett
Malaysia, Nilai (Velodrom Nasional Malaysia) | 24–26 April
Sprint [ Details]	Harrie Lavreysen (NED)	Nicholas Paul (TTO)	Azizulhasni Awang (MAS)
Keirin [ Details]	Azizulhasni Awang (MAS)	Harrie Lavreysen (NED)	Nicholas Paul (TTO)
Omnium [ Details]	Naoki Kojima (JPN)	Grant Koontz (USA)	Yanne Dorenbos (NED)
Elimination Race [ Details]	Ilya Savekin (AIN)	Alvaro Navas (ESP)	Matteo Fiorin (ITA)
Team Sprint [ Details]	Italy; Stefano Minuta; Daniele Napolitano; Mattia Predomo	China; Huang Ruiting; Jin Zhiheng; Li Zhiwei; Zhan Zewei	Netherlands; Harrie Lavreysen; Roy van den Berg; Tijmen van Loon
Team Pursuit [ Details]	China; Li Ni; Pei Zhengyu; Sun Haijao; Wu Junjie; Sun Wentao	France; Erwan Besnier; Mathieu Dupé; Clément Petit; Valentin Tabellion; Oscar Nilsson Julien	Italy; Davide Boscaro; Renato Favero; Etienne Grimod; Francesco Lamon
Madison [ Details]	Germany; Moritz Augenstein; Roger Kluge	New Zealand; George Jackson; Thomas Sexton	Netherlands; Yanne Dorenbos; Vincent Hoppezak

=== Women ===
Event	Winner	Second	Third
Australia, Perth (Perth SpeedDome) | 6–8 March
Sprint [ Details]	Yuan Liying (CHN)	Ellesse Andrews (NZL)	Lea Friedrich (GER)
Keirin [ Details]	Alessia McCaig (AUS)	Alina Lysenko (AIN)	Yuan Liying (CHN)
Omnium [ Details]	Anita Stenberg (NOR)	Tsuyaka Uchino (JPN)	Lee Sze Wing (HKG)
Elimination Race [ Details]	Yareli Acevedo (MEX)	Anita Stenberg (NOR)	Lee Sze Wing (HKG)
Team Sprint [ Details]	China; Luo Xuehuang; Wang Lijuan; Yuan Liying	Germany; Lea Friedrich; Pauline Grabosch; Clara Schneider	Australia; Kristine Perkins; Liliya Tatarinoff; Sophie Watts
Team Pursuit [ Details]	Australia; Claudia Marcks; Maeve Plouffe; Alyssa Polites; Felicity Wilson-Haffenden		
Madison [ Details]	Japan; Maho Kakita; Tsuyaka Uchino	Australia; Alyssa Polites; Keira Will	Mexico; Yareli Acevedo; Sofia Arreola
Hong Kong, Hong Kong (Hong Kong Velodrome) | 17-19 April
Sprint [ Details]	Emma Finucane (GBR)	Mina Sato (JPN)	Hetty van de Wouw (NED)
Keirin [ Details]	Yuan Liying (CHN)	Iana Burlakova (AIN)	Emma Finucane (GBR)
Omnium [ Details]	Tsuyaka Uchino (JPN)	Amalie Dideriksen (DEN)	Yareli Acevedo (MEX)
Elimination Race [ Details]	Anita Stenberg (NOR)	Lee Sze Wing (HKG)	Valentine Fortin (FRA)
Team Sprint [ Details]	China; Luo Xuehuang; Wan Lijuan; Yuan Liying; Tong Mengqi	Great Britain; Lauren Bell; Emma Finucane; Rhianna Parris-Smith	Netherlands; Kimberly Kalee; Hetty van de Wouw; Steffie van der Peet
Team Pursuit [ Details]	New Zealand; Bryony Botha; Prudence Fowler; Emily Shearman; Ally Marée Wollaston; Samantha Donnelly	Great Britain; Megan Barker; Erin Boothman; Madelaine Leech; Jessica Roberts	France; Marion Borras; Mélanie Dupin; Valentine Fortin; Ilona Rouat; Clémence Chereau
Madison [ Details]	France; Marion Borras; Valentine Fortin	Great Britain; Erin Boothman; Madelaine Leech	Netherlands; Lisa van Belle; Nienke Veenhoven
Malaysia, Nilai (Velodrom Nasional Malaysia) | 24–26 April
Sprint [ Details]	Emma Finucane (GBR)	Hetty van de Wouw (NED)	Yuan Liying (CHN)
Keirin [ Details]	Wang Lijuan (CHN)	Luz Daniela Gaxiola Gonzalez (MEX)	Emma Finucane (GBR)
Omnium [ Details]	Anita Stenberg (NOR)	Lorena Wiebes (NED)	Samantha Donnelly (NZL)
Elimination Race [ Details]	Anita Stenberg (NOR)	Yareli Acevedo (MEX)	Lara Gillespie (IRL)
Team Sprint [ Details]	China; Luo Xuehuang; Yuan Liying; Zhu Yuxuan; Wang Lijuan	Netherlands; Kimberly Kalee; Hetty van de Wouw; Steffie van der Peet	Mexico; Luz Daniela Gaxiola Gonzalez; Yuli Paola Verdugo Osuna; Maria Jose Vizcaino Garcia
Team Pursuit [ Details]	New Zealand; Bryony Botha; Samantha Donnelly; Prudence Fowler; Emily Shearman	China; Chen Ning; Gong Xianbing; Wang Xiaoyue; Wei Suwan	Netherlands; Daniek Hengeveld; Lisa van Belle; Maike van der Duin; Lorena Wiebes
Madison [ Details]	Netherlands; Lisa van Belle; Lorena Wiebes	New Zealand; Bryony Botha; Prudence Fowler	Switzerland; Michelle Andres; Aline Seitz

== Medal table ==
* Host nation (Australia, Hong Kong, Malaysia)

Rank	Team	Gold	Silver	Bronze	Total
1	China	7	3	4	14
2	Netherlands	5	5	8	18
3	Great Britain	5	4	4	13
4	Japan	4	5	1	10
5	Germany	4	1	1	6
6	Norway	4	1	0	5
7	Australia	3	4	3	10
8	New Zealand	3	4	1	8
9	Italy	2	0	2	4
9	Malaysia	2	0	2	4
11	France	1	2	3	6
11	Mexico	1	2	3	6
13	Individual Neutral Athletes	1	2	0	3
14	Hong Kong	0	2	2	4
15	Denmark	0	2	0	2
16	Trinidad and Tobago	0	1	1	2
16	United States	0	1	1	2
18	Czech Republic	0	1	0	1
18	Spain	0	1	0	1
20	Austria	0	0	2	2
21	Chinese Taipei	0	0	1	1
21	Ireland	0	0	1	1
21	Switzerland	0	0	1	1
Totals (23 entries)		42	41	41	124
