= 2025 UCI Track Cycling Nations Cup =

2025 track cycling event

- Fifth edition of the UCI Track Cycling Nations Cup

Details
- Dates: 14–16 March 2025
- Location: Turkey
- Races: 1

The 2025 UCI Track Cycling Nations Cup was an event that took place during the 2025 track cycling season. It was the fifth edition of the UCI Track Cycling Nations Cup organised by the UCI.

== Background ==
In November 2024, the UCI announced that the first round of the 2025 Nations Cup would take place in Konya, Turkey between 14 and 16 March 2025. It would be the first major international event to be held at the Konya Velodrome, which opened in 2022. The press release also stated that subsequent rounds would be announced in due course. Previous editions of the Nations Cup had consisted of three rounds. However, no further events were announced; the UCI did not give an official reason for this. Hervé Dagorné, head coach of the Hong Kong team, described the lack of a full three-event schedule as "concerning" and "frustrating", saying that cycling federations had been "kept in the dark".

== Overall team standings ==
Overall team standings are calculated based on total number of points gained by the team's riders in each event.

Rank	Team	Total Points
1	Australia	10666
2	Germany	9290
3	Japan	8733
4	France	8621
5	Netherlands	8414
6	New Zealand	8033
7	Canada	7465
8	Great Britain	7320
9	Poland	6611
10	Czech Republic	5471

== Results ==
=== Men ===
Event	Winner	Second	Third
Sprint; Details	Matthew Richardson (GBR)	Harry Ledingham-Horn (GBR)	Rayan Helal (FRA)
Keirin; Details	Muhammad Shah Firdaus Sahrom (MAS)	Sébastien Vigier (FRA)	Shinji Nakano (JPN)
Omnium; Details	Yanne Dorenbos (NED)	Ashlin Barry (USA)	Kazushige Kuboki (JPN)
Elimination Race; Details	Jules Hesters (BEL)	Noah Wulff (DEN)	Tim Wafler (AUT)
Team Sprint; Details	Great Britain; Harry Ledingham-Horn; Harry Radford; Matthew Richardson	Japan; Yoshitaku Nagasako; Yuta Obara; Kaiya Ota	Australia; Daniel Barber; Ryan Elliott; Leigh Hoffman
Team Pursuit; Details	Australia; Liam Walsh; Blake Agnoletto; Joshua Duffy; James Moriarty; Oliver Bleddyn	United States; Ashlin Barry; David Domonoske; Graeme Frislie; Anders Johnson	New Zealand; Tom Sexton; Marshall Erwood; Keegan Hornblow; Nick Kergozou
Madison; Details	Spain; Sebastián Mora Vedri; Albert Torres Barceló	Netherlands; Vincent Hoppezak; Yoeri Havik	Belgium; Jules Hesters; Noah Vandenbranden

=== Women ===
Event	Winner	Second	Third
Sprint; Details	Yuan Liying (CHN)	Alina Lysenko (ANA)	Hetty van de Wouw (NED)
Keirin; Details	Mathilde Gros (FRA)	Veronika Jaborníková (CZE)	Mina Sato (JPN)
Omnium; Details	Ally Wollaston (NZL)	Lisa van Belle (NED)	Valeria Valgonen (ANA)
Elimination Race; Details	Yareli Acevedo (MEX)	Lisa van Belle (NED)	Mizuki Ikeda (JPN)
Team Sprint; Details	Netherlands; Kimberly Kalee; Hetty van de Wouw; Steffie van der Peet	Great Britain; Lauren Bell; Rhian Edmunds; Lowri Thomas	Germany; Lea Friedrich; Pauline Grabosch; Clara Schneider
Team Pursuit; Details	Germany; Messane Bräutigam; Franziska Brauße; Lisa Klein; Laura Süßemilch	New Zealand; Emily Shearman; Bryony Botha; Samantha Donnelly; Prudence Fowler; Ally Wollaston	Australia; Maeve Plouffe; Keira Will; Claudia Marcks; Sophie Edwards; Sally Carter
Madison; Details	Denmark; Amalie Dideriksen; Ellen Hjøllund Klinge	Germany; Messane Bräutigam; Lea Lin Teutenberg	New Zealand; Samantha Donnelly; Emily Shearman

== Medal table ==
Rank	Team	Gold	Silver	Bronze	Total
1	Netherlands	2	3	1	6
2	Great Britain	2	2	0	4
3	New Zealand	1	1	2	4
4	France	1	1	1	3
4	Germany	1	1	1	3
6	Denmark	1	1	0	2
7	Australia	1	0	2	3
8	Belgium	1	0	1	2
9	China	1	0	0	1
9	Malaysia	1	0	0	1
9	Mexico	1	0	0	1
9	Spain	1	0	0	1
13	United States	0	2	0	2
14	Japan	0	1	4	5
–	Authorised Neutral Athletes	0	1	1	2
15	Czech Republic	0	1	0	1
16	Austria	0	0	1	1
Totals (16 entries)		14	14	14	42
