= 2024 UCI Track Cycling Nations Cup =

2024 track cycling series

- Fourth edition of the UCI Track Cycling Nations Cup

Details
- Dates: 2 February – 14 April 2024
- Location: Australia; Hong Kong; Canada
- Races: 3

The 2024 UCI Track Cycling Nations Cup (also known as the Tissot UCI Track Nations Cup for sponsorship reasons) was a multi-race tournament over a track cycling season. It was the fourth series of the UCI Track Cycling Nations Cup organised by the UCI.

== Series ==
3 rounds were scheduled:

Date	Location
2-4 February	Adelaide, Australia
15-17 March	Hong Kong, China
12-14 April	Milton, Canada

== Standings ==
=== Men ===
Sprint

Rank	after 3 rounds	Points
1	(Japan) Kaiya Ota (Team Rakuten K Dreams)	1600
2	(Australia) Matthew Richardson	1440
3	(Lithuania) Vasilijus Lendel	1400
4	(Trinidad and Tobago) Nicholas Paul	1280
5	(Netherlands) Harrie Lavreysen	1200

Keirin

Rank	after 3 rounds	Points
1	(Japan) Kaiya Ota (Team Rakuten K Dreams)	1440
2	(United Kingdom) Jack Carlin	1240
3	(Netherlands) Jeffrey Hoogland	1080
4	(Australia) Matthew Glaetzer	1080
5	(Australia) Matthew Richardson	1080

Omnium

Rank	after 3 rounds	Points
1	(Canada) Dylan Bibic	1400
2	(New Zealand) Aaron Gate	1400
3	(Japan) Kazushige Kuboki	1280
4	(Austria) Tim Wafler	1264
5	(Portugal) Iúri Leitão	1080

Elimination Race

Rank	after 3 rounds	Points
1	(Canada) Dylan Bibic	1600
2	(Japan) Shunsuke Imamura (Team Bridgestone Cycling)	1320
3	(Italy) Michele Scartezzini	1040
4	(Spain) Erik Martorell	1000
5	(United States) Grant Koontz	968

Team Sprint

Rank	after 3 rounds	Points
1	Great Britain	2880
2	China	2580
3	Australia	2400
4	Germany	2220
5	Japan	2160

Team Pursuit

Rank	after 3 rounds	Points
1	Great Britain	4240
2	Japan	3760
3	Italy	3360
4	Belgium	3040
5	Australia	2640

Madison

Rank	after 3 rounds	Points
1	Portugal	3680
2	Japan	3440
3	New Zealand	3200
4	Germany	3120
5	Belgium	2528

=== Women ===
Sprint

Rank	after 3 rounds	Points
1	(France) Mathilde Gros	2160
2	(United Kingdom) Emma Finucane	1360
3	(Germany) Emma Hinze	1320
4	(New Zealand) Ellesse Andrews	1320
5	(Japan) Mina Sato (Team Rakuten K Dreams)	1200

Keirin

Rank	after 3 rounds	Points
1	(France) Mathilde Gros	1520
2	(United Kingdom) Emma Finucane	1400
3	(Japan) Mina Sato (Team Rakuten K Dreams)	1360
4	(Canada) Lauriane Genest	1280
5	(China) Wang Lijuan	1088

Omnium

Rank	after 3 rounds	Points
1	(United Kingdom) Katie Archibald	1520
2	(Japan) Tsuyaka Uchino (Team Rakuten K Dreams)	1408
3	(Japan) Yumi Kajihara	1280
4	(United States) Jennifer Valente	1280
5	(China) Liu Jiali	1256

Elimination Race

Rank	after 3 rounds	Points
1	(Norway) Anita Stenberg	1616
2	(United States) Jennifer Valente	1520
3	(Spain) Laura Rodríguez Cordero	1320
4	(Poland) Maja Tracka	1080
5	(Lithuania) Olivija Baleišytė	1080

Team Sprint

Rank	after 3 rounds	Points
1	Poland	2700
2	Mexico	2460
3	Great Britain	2400
4	France	2340
5	Netherlands	2100

Team Pursuit

Rank	after 3 rounds	Points
1	New Zealand	3200
2	China	3120
3	Great Britain	3040
4	Japan	3040
5	Italy	2480

Madison

Rank	after 3 rounds	Points
1	Italy	3280
2	Great Britain	3200
3	Switzerland	3040
4	Team Rakuten K Dreams	2720
5	New Zealand	2560

== Overall team standings ==
Overall team standings are calculated based on total number of points gained by the team's riders in each event.

Rank	Team	(Australia)	(Hong Kong)	(Canada)	Total Points
1	Great Britain	13009	6682	10081	29772
2	Japan	8416	10297	5152	23865
3	Germany	7489	7990	6340	21819
4	New Zealand	9882	9622	1520	21024
5	Italy	6256	6034	8374	20664
6	France	2288	6669	11180	20137
7	Australia	11656	8424	–	20080
8	Canada	8308	208	11076	19592
9	Netherlands	–	5889	11056	16945
10	China	5700	6684	3227	15611

== Results ==
=== Men ===
Event	Winner	Second	Third
Australia, Adelaide | 2–4 February
Sprint; Details	Kaiya Ota (JPN) (Team Rakuten K Dreams) +0.086/9.764/10.277	Matthew Richardson (AUS); 9.814/+0.030/+0.036	Matthew Glaetzer (AUS)
Keirin; Details	Azizulhasni Awang (MAS)	Shinji Nakano (JPN)	Kaiya Ota (JPN) (Team Rakuten K Dreams)
Omnium; Details	Dylan Bibic (CAN); 104 pts.	Elia Viviani (ITA); 104 pts.	Lindsay De Vylder (BEL); 101 pts.
Elimination Race; Details	Dylan Bibic (CAN)	Blake Agnoletto (AUS)	Grant Koontz (USA)
Team Sprint; Details	Australia; Matthew Glaetzer; Leigh Hoffman; Matthew Richardson; Thomas Cornish; 42.154	Japan; Yoshitaku Nagasako; Yuta Obara; Kaiya Ota; 42.750	Great Britain; Jack Carlin; Ed Lowe; Hamish Turnbull; 42.915
Team Pursuit; Details	Great Britain; Josh Tarling; William Tidball; Rhys Britton; Charlie Tanfield; Josh Charlton; 3:48.469	Australia; Conor Leahy; James Moriarty; Kelland O'Brien; Sam Welsford; Blake Agnoletto; 3:49.876	Italy; Francesco Lamon; Elia Viviani; Davide Boscaro; Filippo Ganna; Manlio Moro; 3:49.825
Madison; Details	New Zealand; Aaron Gate; Campbell Stewart; 73 pts.	Germany; Roger Kluge; Theo Reinhardt; 55 pts.	Great Britain; Josh Tarling; Oliver Wood; 52 pts.
Hong Kong, Hong Kong | 15–17 March
Sprint; Details	Kaiya Ota (JPN) (Team Rakuten K Dreams) +0.011/9.776/9.961	Matthew Richardson (AUS); 9.867/+0.001/+0.012	Nicholas Paul (TTO); 10.100/10.041
Keirin; Details	Kaiya Ota (JPN) (Team Rakuten K Dreams)	Matthew Glaetzer (AUS)	Sam Dakin (NZL)
Omnium; Details	Aaron Gate (NZL); 144 pts.	Oscar Nilsson-Julien (FRA); 143 pts.	Naoki Kojima (JPN); 133 pts.
Elimination Race; Details	William Perrett (GBR)	Jules Hesters (BEL)	Graeme Frislie (AUS)
Team Sprint; Details	Australia; Thomas Cornish; Leigh Hoffman; Matthew Richardson; Matthew Glaetzer; 42.274	Japan; Yoshitaku Nagasako; Yuta Obara; Kaiya Ota; 42.958	China; Guo Shuai; Liu Qi; Zhou Yu; 42.795
Team Pursuit; Details	Denmark; Tobias Hansen; Robin Skivild; Lasse Norman Leth; Frederik Madsen	Japan; Naoki Kojima; Eiya Hashimoto; Kazushige Kuboki; Shoi Matsuda; OVL	New Zealand; Campbell Stewart; Thomas Sexton; Keegan Hornblow; George Jackson; 3:51.664
Madison; Details	New Zealand; Aaron Gate; Campbell Stewart; 45 pts.	Spain; Sebastián Mora; Albert Torres Barceló; 35 pts.	Japan; Eiya Hashimoto; Kazushige Kuboki; 35 pts.
Canada, Milton | 12–14 April
Sprint; Details	Harrie Lavreysen (NED); 9.920/9.925	Jair Tjon En Fa (SUR) +0.031/+0.138	Nicholas Paul (TTO); 9.762/9.889
Keirin; Details	Harrie Lavreysen (NED)	Jeffrey Hoogland (NED)	Jack Carlin (GBR)
Omnium; Details	Ethan Hayter (GBR); 163 pts.	Kazushige Kuboki (JPN); 150 pts.	Benjamin Thomas (FRA); 143 pts.
Elimination Race; Details	Dylan Bibic (CAN)	Shunsuke Imamura (JPN)	Mark Stewart (GBR)
Team Sprint; Details	Netherlands; Jeffrey Hoogland; Harrie Lavreysen; Roy van den Berg; 41.860	Great Britain; Jack Carlin; Ed Lowe; Hamish Turnbull; 42.712	Canada; Ryan Dodyk; James Hedgcock; Tyler Rorke; 43.411
Team Pursuit; Details	Great Britain; Ethan Hayter; Daniel Bigham; Ethan Vernon; Oliver Wood; Charlie Tanfield	Belgium; Tuur Dens; Thibaut Bernard; Yoran van Gucht; Noah Vandenbranden; Lindsay De Vylder; OVL	France; Thomas Boudat; Thomas Denis; Corentin Ermenault; Valentin Tabellion; Benjamin Thomas
Madison; Details	Belgium; Lindsay De Vylder; Robbe Ghys; 67 pts.	Netherlands; Yanne Dorenbos; Jan-Willem van Schip; 50 pts.	Portugal; Ivo Oliveira; Iúri Leitão; 46 pts.

=== Women ===
Event	Winner	Second	Third
Australia, Australia | 2–4 February
Sprint; Details	Emma Hinze (GER) +0.037/11.115/11.177	Mina Sato (JPN) (Team Rakuten K Dreams); 11.100/+0.093/+0.005	Mathilde Gros (FRA)
Keirin; Details	Mina Sato (JPN) (Team Rakuten K Dreams)	Katy Marchant (Team Inspired) (GBR)	Lauriane Genest (CAN)
Omnium; Details	Ally Wollaston (NZL); 134 pts.	Katie Archibald (GBR); 125 pts.	Jennifer Valente (USA); 100 pts.
Elimination Race; Details	Ally Wollaston (NZL)	Jennifer Valente (USA)	Jess Roberts (GBR)
Team Sprint; Details	Great Britain; Sophie Capewell; Emma Finucane; Katy Marchant; Lauren Bell; 46.023	China; Bao Shanju; Guo Yufang; Yuan Liying; Jiang Yulu; 1:15.149	New Zealand; Ellesse Andrews; Shaane Fulton; Rebecca Petch; Olivia King; 47.390
Team Pursuit; Details	New Zealand; Bryony Botha; Ally Wollaston; Samantha Donnelly; Emily Shearman; Michaela Drummond; 4:10.229	Great Britain; Katie Archibald; Elinor Barker; Josie Knight; Anna Morris; Megan Barker; 4:10.578	Australia; Georgia Baker; Alexandra Manly; Sophie Edwards; Chloe Moran; Maeve Plouffe; 4:14.565
Madison; Details	Great Britain; Katie Archibald; Elinor Barker; 27 pts.	Australia; Georgia Baker; Alexandra Manly; 32 pts.	United States; Jennifer Valente; Lily Williams; 23 pts.
Hong Kong, Hong Kong | 15–17 March
Sprint; Details	Emma Finucane (GBR); 11.011/10.904	Mathilde Gros (FRA) +0.282/+0.187	Lea Friedrich (GER); 11.118/11.188
Keirin; Details	Emma Finucane (GBR)	Emma Hinze (GER)	Alina Lysenko (Neutral athlete)
Omnium; Details	Yumi Kajihara (JPN); 124 pts.	Tsuyaka Uchino (JPN) (Team Rakuten K Dreams); 113 pts.	Lara Gillespie (IRL); 108 pts.
Elimination Race; Details	Yumi Kajihara (JPN)	Anita Stenberg (NOR)	Yareli Acevedo (MEX)
Team Sprint; Details	Great Britain; Sophie Capewell; Emma Finucane; Katy Marchant; 46.092	Germany; Lea Friedrich; Pauline Grabosch; Emma Hinze; 46.349	China; Bao Shanju; Guo Yufang; Yuan Liying; 46.728
Team Pursuit; Details	New Zealand; Bryony Botha; Emily Shearman; Samantha Donnelly; Nicole Shields	Ireland; Lara Gillespie; Mia Griffin; Kelly Murphy; Alice Sharpe; OVL	Japan; Mizuki Ikeda; Yumi Kajihara; Maho Kakita; Tsuyaka Uchino; 4:17.947
Madison; Details	Japan (Team Rakuten K Dreams); Maho Kakita; Tsuyaka Uchino; 54 pt	New Zealand; Bryony Botha; Emily Shearman; 53 pts.	Netherlands; Marit Raaijmakers; Lisa van Belle; 49 pts.
Canada, Milton | 12–14 April
Sprint; Details	Mathilde Gros (FRA); 10.907/10.964	Ellesse Andrews (NZL) +1.174/+0.228	Daniela Gaxiola (MEX); 11.424/11.359
Keirin; Details	Ellesse Andrews (NZL)	Steffie van der Peet (NED)	Lauriane Genest (CAN)
Omnium; Details	Katie Archibald (GBR); 131 pts.	Letizia Paternoster (ITA); 111 pts.	Jennifer Valente (USA); 107 pts.
Elimination Race; Details	Jennifer Valente (USA)	Letizia Paternoster (ITA)	Anita Stenberg (NOR)
Team Sprint; Details	Netherlands; Kyra Lamberink; Hetty van de Wouw; Steffie van der Peet; 46.265	Mexico; Daniela Gaxiola; Jessica Salazar; Yuli Verdugo; 46.818	Poland; Marlena Karwacka; Urszula Los; Nikola Sibiak; 47.387
Team Pursuit; Details	Great Britain; Katie Archibald; Jess Roberts; Josie Knight; Anna Morris; Megan Barker; 4:16.601	Italy; Elisa Balsamo; Chiara Consonni; Martina Alzini; Vittoria Guazzini; Martina Fidanza; 4:13.511	France; Clara Copponi; Valentine Fortin; Marion Borras; Marie Le Net; 4:10.272
Madison; Details	Great Britain; Katie Archibald; Neah Evans; 37 pts.	France; Valentine Fortin; Marion Borras; 25 pts.	United States; Jennifer Valente; Lily Williams; 19 pts.

== Medal table ==
Rank	Team	Gold	Silver	Bronze	Total
1	Great Britain	12	3	5	20
2	New Zealand	8	2	3	13
3	Team Rakuten K Dreams	5	2	1	8
4	Netherlands	4	3	1	8
5	Canada	3	0	3	6
6	Australia	2	6	3	11
7	Japan	2	6	2	10
8	France	1	3	4	8
9	Germany	1	3	1	5
10	Belgium	1	2	1	4
11	United States	1	1	5	7
12	Denmark	1	0	0	1
12	Malaysia	1	0	0	1
14	Italy	0	4	1	5
15	China	0	1	2	3
15	Mexico	0	1	2	3
17	Ireland	0	1	1	2
17	Norway	0	1	1	2
19	Spain	0	1	0	1
19	Suriname	0	1	0	1
19	Team Inspired	0	1	0	1
22	Trinidad and Tobago	0	0	2	2
23	Poland	0	0	1	1
23	Portugal	0	0	1	1
23	Team Bridgestone Cycling	0	0	1	1
–	Individual Neutral Athletes	0	0	1	1
Totals (25 entries)		42	42	42	126
