= 2025 Oceania Track Championships =

Cycling championships

- Venue: Brisbane, Australia
- Date: 11–15 February
- Velodrome: Anna Meares Velodrome
- Events: 24 (12 women, 12 men)

The 2025 Oceania Track Championships was a track cycling competition that took place at the Anna Meares Velodrome in Brisbane, Australia, from 11 to 15 February 2025.

== Medal summary ==
Events with a grey background are non-Olympic events.

=== Men ===
Event	Gold	Silver	Bronze
Individual pursuit	Tom Sexton; New Zealand	Keegan Hornblow; New Zealand	James Moriarty; Australia
Team pursuit	Australia; Cameron Scott; Declan Trezise; Liam Walsh; Oscar Gallagher	New Zealand; Kyle Aitken; Ben Oliver; Marshall Erwood; Mitchel Fitzsimons; Tom Sexton	New Zealand; Magnus Jamieson; Lucas Bhimy; Daniel Morton; Keegan Hornblow; Campbell Stewart
Sprint	Leigh Hoffman; Australia	Daniel Barber; Australia	Thomas Cornish; Australia
Team sprint	Australia; Ryan Elliott; Thomas Cornish; Daniel Barber; Leigh Hoffman	New Zealand; Jaxson Russell; Kaio Lart; Luke Blackwood; Louis Vuleta	Australia; Tayte Ryan; Maxwell Liebeknecht; Byron Davies
Keirin	Sam Dakin; New Zealand	Byron Davies; Australia	Daniel Barber; Australia
Madison	New Zealand; Tom Sexton; Campbell Stewart	Australia; Oliver Bleddyn; Blake Agnoletto	Australia; Liam Walsh; Declan Trezise
Omnium	Campbell Stewart; New Zealand	Tom Sexton; New Zealand	Oliver Bleddyn; Australia
Scratch	Keegan Hornblow; New Zealand	Campbell Stewart; New Zealand	Nick Kergozou; New Zealand
Points race	Tom Sexton; New Zealand	Oliver Bleddyn; Australia	Keegan Hornblow; New Zealand
Elimination	Blake Agnoletto; Australia	Marshall Erwood; New Zealand	Keegan Hornblow; New Zealand
1 km time trial	Tom Sexton; New Zealand	Tayte Ryan; Australia	Byron Davies; Australia

=== Women ===
Event	Gold	Silver	Bronze
Individual pursuit	Bryony Botha; New Zealand	Emily Shearman; New Zealand	Samantha Donnelly; New Zealand
Team pursuit	New Zealand; Emily Shearman; Samantha Donnelly; Prudence Fowler; Rylee McMullen; Bryony Botha	Australia; Claudia Marcks; Nicole Duncan; Alli Anderson; Sally Carter; Keira Will	Australia; Odette Lynch; Summer Nordmeyer; Lilyth Jones; Isla Carr
Sprint	Ellesse Andrews; New Zealand	Alessia McCaig; Australia	Shaane Fulton; New Zealand
Team sprint	New Zealand; Olivia King; Shaane Fulton; Ellesse Andrews	Australia; Kristine Perkins; Alessia McCaig; Sophie Watts	Australia; Kalinda Robinson; Emma Stevens; Lauren Perry
Keirin	Ellesse Andrews; New Zealand	Olivia King; New Zealand	Shaane Fulton; New Zealand
Madison	New Zealand; Bryony Botha; Samantha Donnelly	New Zealand; Rylee McMullen; Emily Shearman	Australia; Sophie Edwards; Alli Anderson
Omnium	Emily Shearman; New Zealand	Bryony Botha; New Zealand	Maeve Plouffe; Australia
Scratch	Mckenzie Milne; New Zealand	Lucy Reeve; New Zealand	Samantha Donnelly; New Zealand
Points race	Rylee McMullen; New Zealand	Bryony Botha; New Zealand	Samantha Donnelly; New Zealand
Elimination	Samantha Donnelly; New Zealand	Bryony Botha; New Zealand	Alli Anderson; Australia
1 km time trial	Ellesse Andrews; New Zealand	Shaane Fulton; New Zealand	Claudia Marcks; Australia

== Medal table ==
* Host nation (Australia)

Rank	Nation	Gold	Silver	Bronze	Total
1	New Zealand	17	14	9	40
2	Australia*	5	8	13	26
Totals (2 entries)		22	22	22	66
