= Track cycling at the 2026 Commonwealth Games – Men's points race =

Cycling Track – Men's points race at the 2026 Commonwealth Games
- Venue: Sir Chris Hoy Velodrome
- Dates: 2 August

Medalists
gold medal	Matthew Bostock	Isle of Man
silver medal	Oliver Bleddyn	Australia
bronze medal	George Jackson	New Zealand

The men's points race at the 2026 Commonwealth Games was part of the cycling programme, and took place on 2 August 2026.

== Schedule ==
The schedule is as follows:

All times are British Summer Time (UTC+1)

Date	Time	Round
Sunday 2 August 2026	09:15	Qualifying
Sunday 2 August 2026	15:55	Final

== Results ==
=== Qualifying ===
80 laps (20 km) were raced with 8 sprints. The top 9 per heat advanced to the finals.

==== Heat 1 ====
Rank	Rider	Lap points	Sprint points	Total points	Notes
1	William Salter (WAL)	20	15	35	Q
2	George Jackson (NZL)	20	12	32	Q
3	Logan MacLean (SCO)	20	8	28	Q
4	Matthew Bostock (IOM)		16	16	Q
5	Conor Leahy (AUS)		15	15	Q
6	Keegan Hornblow (NZL)		14	14	Q
7	Blake Agnoletto (AUS)		8	8	Q
8	Henry Hobbs (ENG)		7	7	Q
9	William Tidball (ENG)		2	2	Q
10	Jadian Neaves (TTO)	–20	2	–18	
–	Delroy Carty (AIA)	–40		DNF	
–	Harshveer Sekhon (IND)	–40		DNF	
–	Red Walters (GRN)	DNS			

==== Heat 2 ====
Rank	Rider	Lap points	Sprint points	Total points	Notes
1	Oliver Bleddyn (AUS)	20	10	30	Q
2	Mark Stewart (SCO)	20	7	27	Q
3	Charlie Tanfield (ENG)	20	7	27	Q
4	Elliot Rowe (SCO)	20	7	27	Q
5	William Perrett (WAL)	20	6	26	Q
6	Ben Swift (IOM)		14	14	Q
7	Thomas Sexton (NZL)		13	13	Q
8	Conor White (BER)		11	11	Q
9	William Roberts (WAL)		10	10	Q
10	Gabriel Seguin (CAN)		10	10	
11	Dinesh Kumar (IND)		4	4	
12	Matti Dobbins (NIR)			0	

=== Final ===
160 laps (40 km) were raced with 16 sprints.

Rank	Rider	Lap points	Sprint points	Total points
1st place, gold medalist(s)	Matthew Bostock (IOM)	60	23	83
2nd place, silver medalist(s)	Oliver Bleddyn (AUS)	60	20	80
3rd place, bronze medalist(s)	George Jackson (NZL)	40	21	61
4	Mark Stewart (SCO)	40	21	61
5	Thomas Sexton (NZL)	40	13	53
6	William Perrett (WAL)	40	10	50
7	Keegan Hornblow (NZL)	40	7	47
8	Elliot Rowe (SCO)	40	5	45
9	Blake Agnoletto (AUS)	20	14	34
10	Conor Leahy (AUS)	20	10	30
11	William Roberts (WAL)	20	10	30
12	Charlie Tanfield (ENG)	20	9	29
13	Ben Swift (IOM)	20	9	29
14	William Salter (WAL)	–20	3	–17
15	Logan MacLean (SCO)		2	2
16	Conor White (BER)		2	2
	Henry Hobbs (ENG)			DNF
	William Tidball (ENG)	–20		DNF
