= Track cycling at the 2026 Commonwealth Games – Men's scratch race =

Cycling Track – Men's scratch race at the 2026 Commonwealth Games
- Venue: Sir Chris Hoy Velodrome
- Dates: 1 August

Medalists
gold medal	Henry Hobbs	England
silver medal	Thomas Cornish	Australia
bronze medal	Ethan Vernon	England

The men's scratch race at the 2026 Commonwealth Games was part of the cycling programme, and took place on 1 August 2026.

== Schedule ==
The schedule is as follows:

All times are British Summer Time (UTC+1)

Date	Time	Round
Saturday 1 August 2026	11:49	Qualification
Saturday 1 August 2026	18:20	Final

== Results ==
=== Qualification ===
Race distance: 30 laps (7.5km). First 12 riders in each heat qualify to final.

==== Heat 1 ====
Rank	Rider	Laps down	Notes
1	George Jackson (NZL)		Q
2	Lau New Joe (MAS)		Q
3	Ethan Vernon (ENG)		Q
4	Keegan Hornblow (NZL)		Q
5	Lewis Askey (SCO)		Q
6	William Perrett (WAL)		Q
7	Matthew Bostock (IOM)		Q
8	Blake Agnoletto (AUS)		Q
9	Henry Hobbs (ENG)		Q
10	Jonathan Hinse (CAN)		Q
11	Thomas Cornish (AUS)		Q
12	Conor White (BER)		
12	Harshveer Singh Sekhon (IND)	DNF	

==== Heat 2 ====
Rank	Rider	Laps down	Notes
1	Mark Stewart (SCO)		Q
2	Rhys Britton (WAL)		Q
3	Logan MacLean (SCO)		Q
4	Oliver Bleddyn (AUS)		Q
5	Matti Dobbins (NIR)		Q
6	Marshall Erwood (NZL)		Q
7	Ben Swift (IOM)		Q
8	William Roberts (WAL)		Q
9	Red Walters (GRN)		Q
10	William Tidball (ENG)		Q
11	Jadian Neaves (TTO)		Q
12	Gabriel Seguin (CAN)		Q
	Delroy Carty (AIA)	DNF	
	Dinesh Kumar (IND)	DNF	

=== Final ===
40 laps (10 km) were raced.

Rank	Riders	Laps down
1	Henry Hobbs (ENG)	
2	Thomas Cornish (AUS)	
3	Ethan Vernon (ENG)	
4	Matthew Bostock (IOM)	
5	Blake Agnoletto (AUS)	
6	Mark Stewart (SCO)	
7	Keegan Hornblow (NZL)	
8	Oliver Bleddyn (AUS)	
9	Gabriel Seguin (CAN)	
10	Marshall Erwood (NZL)	
11	Lewis Askey (SCO)	
12	George Jackson (NZL)	
13	William Perrett (WAL)	
14	William Roberts (WAL)	
	Jonathan Hinse (CAN)	DNF
	William Tidball (ENG)	DNF
	Red Walters (GRN)	DNF
	Ben Swift (IOM)	DNF
	Lau New Joe (MAS)	DNF
	Matti Dobbins (NIR)	DNF
	Logan MacLean (SCO)	DNF
	Valencia Tan (SGP)	DNF
	Sophie Edwards (AUS)	DNF
	Jadian Neaves (TTO)	DNF
	Rhys Britton (WAL)	DNF
