= Track cycling at the 2026 Commonwealth Games – Men's individual pursuit =

Cycling Track – Men's individual pursuit at the 2026 Commonwealth Games
- Venue: Sir Chris Hoy Velodrome
- Dates: 31 July
- Winning time: 4:03.898

Medalists
gold medal	Oliver Bleddyn	Australia
silver medal	Conor Leahy	Australia
bronze medal	James Moriarty	Australia

The men's individual pursuit at the 2026 Commonwealth Games was part of the cycling programme, and took place on 31 July 2026.

== Records ==
Prior to this competition, the existing world and Games records were as follows:

World record	(Italy) Jonathan Milan	3:59.193	Ballerup Super Arena, Ballerup	18 October 2024
Commonwealth Games record	(New Zealand) Aaron Gate	4:07.129	Lee Valley VeloPark, London	30 July 2022

== Schedule ==
The schedule is as follows:

All times are British Summer Time (UTC+1)

Date	Time	Round
Friday 31 July 2026	12:29	Qualifying
Friday 31 July 2026	18:16 / 18:23	Finals

== Results ==
=== Qualifying ===
The two fastest riders advanced to the gold medal final. The next two fastest riders advanced to the bronze medal final.

Rank	Riders	Time	Behind	Notes
1	Oliver Bleddyn (AUS)	4:04.132	—	QG, GR
2	Conor Leahy (AUS)	4:04.147	+0.015	QG
3	Matthew Bostock (IOM)	4:04.700	+0.568	QB
4	James Moriarty (AUS)	4:05.677	+1.545	QB
5	Charlie Tanfield (ENG)	4:06.254	+2.122	
6	Ethan Vernon (ENG)	4:06.367	+2.235	
7	Marshall Erwood (NZL)	4:07.415	+3.283	
8	Josh Charlton (ENG)	4:08.402	+4.270	
9	Michael Gill (SCO)	4:11.944	+7.812	
10	Rhys Britton (WAL)	4:13.063	+8.931	
11	Daniel Morton (NZL)	4:14.069	+9.937	
12	Tim Shoreman (SCO)	4:15.404	+11.272	
13	William Salter (WAL)	4:16.617	+12.485	
14	Thomas Sexton (NZL)	4:19.657	+15.525	
15	Jonathan Hinse (CAN)	4:19.681	+15.549	
16	Gabriel Seguin (CAN)	4:24.561	+20.429	
17	Dinesh Kumar (IND)	4:29.267	+25.135	
18	Conor White (BER)	4:33.299	+20.167	
19	Harshveer Sekhon (IND)	4:35.524	+31.392	
20	Ibrahim Jalloh (SLE)	5:10.110	+1:05.978	
21	Peter Karanja (KEN)	5:22.023	+1:17.891	
22	Mustapha Koroma (SLE)	5:41.361	+1:37.229	
23	Farrakhan Shaaban Mohammed (GHA)	5:43.345	+1:38.213	

=== Finals ===
Rank	Nation	Time	Gap	Notes
Gold medal final
1st place, gold medalist(s)	Oliver Bleddyn (AUS)	4:03.898	—	GR
2nd place, silver medalist(s)	Conor Leahy (AUS)	4:07.883	+3.985	
Bronze medal final
3rd place, bronze medalist(s)	James Moriarty (AUS)	4:04.957	—	
4	Matthew Bostock (IOM)	4:05.820	+0.863	
