= 2023 UCI Track Cycling Nations Cup =

International track cycling competition

- Third edition of the UCI Track Cycling Nations Cup

Details
- Dates: 23 February – 23 April 2023
- Location: Indonesia; Egypt; Canada
- Races: 3

The 2023 UCI Track Cycling Nations Cup (also known as the Tissot UCI Track Cycling Nations Cup for sponsorship reasons) was a multi-race tournament over a track cycling season. It was the third series of the UCI Track Cycling Nations Cup organised by the UCI.

== Series ==
3 rounds were scheduled:

Date	Location
23-26 February	Jakarta, Indonesia
14-17 March	Cairo, Egypt
20-23 April	Milton, Canada

== Standings ==
=== Men ===
Sprint

Rank	after 3 rounds	Points
1	(Poland) Mateusz Rudyk	1680
2	(Netherlands) Harrie Lavreysen	1600
3	(Israel) Mikhail Yakovlev	1360
4	(Japan) Kaiya Ota	1360
5	(China) Zhou Yu	1312

Keirin

Rank	after 3 rounds	Points
1	(Colombia) Kevin Quintero	1360
2	(Australia) Matthew Richardson	1280
3	(Malaysia) Shah Firdaus Sahrom	1240
4	(Japan) Shinji Nakano	1200
5	(Suriname) Jaïr Tjon En Fa	1081

Omnium

Rank	after 3 rounds	Points
1	(Spain) Sebastián Mora	1680
2	(France) Thomas Boudat	1320
3	(Netherlands) Vincent Hoppezak (BEAT Cycling)	1200
4	(Germany) Roger Kluge	848
5	(France) Donavan Grondin	800

Elimination Race

Rank	after 3 rounds	Points
1	(Japan) Eiya Hashimoto (Team Bridgestone Cycling)	1760
2	(Netherlands) Yoeri Havik	1360
3	(Japan) Kazushige Kuboki	1120
4	(Italy) Michele Scartezzini	1104
5	(Germany) Theo Reinhardt	960

Team Sprint

Rank	after 3 rounds	Points
1	China	2700
2	Great Britain	2640
3	Australia	2400
4	Netherlands	2280
5	Germany	2280

Team Pursuit

Rank	after 3 rounds	Points
1	Great Britain	4000
2	France	3840
3	Denmark	3200
4	Italy	3040
5	Canada	3040

Madison

Rank	after 3 rounds	Points
1	Germany	3856
2	Netherlands	3840
3	Portugal	3600
4	Belgium	3040
5	Japan	2720

=== Women ===
Sprint

Rank	after 3 rounds	Points
1	(Colombia) Martha Bayona	1480
2	(United Kingdom) Emma Finucane	1440
3	(United Kingdom) Sophie Capewell	1320
4	(Italy) Miriam Vece	1216
5	(Belgium) Nicky Degrendele	1160

Keirin

Rank	after 3 rounds	Points
1	(Japan) Mina Sato	1600
2	(Germany) Alessa-Catriona Pröpster	1441
3	(Colombia) Martha Bayona	1368
4	(Japan) Fuko Umekawa (Team Rakuten K Dreams)	1200
5	(New Zealand) Ellesse Andrews	1080

Omnium

Rank	after 3 rounds	Points
1	(New Zealand) Ally Wollaston	1600
2	(Norway) Anita Stenberg	1440
3	(United States) Jennifer Valente	1240
4	(Denmark) Amalie Dideriksen	1240
5	(Netherlands) Maike van der Duin	1120

Elimination Race

Rank	after 3 rounds	Points
1	(Norway) Anita Stenberg	1528
2	(United States) Jennifer Valente	1520
3	(France) Victoire Berteau	1280
4	(Netherlands) Marit Raaijmakers	1200
5	(Slovakia) Alžbeta Bačíková	1152

Team Sprint

Rank	after 3 rounds	Points
1	China	3120
2	Great Britain	2760
3	Mexico	2700
4	Poland	2520
5	Germany	2280

Team Pursuit

Rank	after 3 rounds	Points
1	Great Britain	3760
2	Germany	3440
3	Canada	3280
4	Ireland	3280
5	Italy	3120

Madison

Rank	after 3 rounds	Points
1	Great Britain	3760
2	Italy	3280
3	France	3040
4	Denmark	3040
5	Switzerland	2560

== Overall team standings ==
Overall team standings are calculated based on total number of points gained by the team's riders in each event.

Rank	Team	(Indonesia)	(Egypt)	(Canada)	Total Points
1	Great Britain	9899	10844	11413	32156
2	Germany	8821	10544	9533	28898
3	France	11429	12441	3688	27558
4	Netherlands	9468	10256	4440	24164
5	Japan	9596	8572	3992	22160
6	New Zealand	10390	8898	1737	21025
7	Italy	5789	6941	7039	19769
8	Canada	5910	3440	10397	19747
9	Australia	8840		8274	17114
10	China	3122	5831	7569	16522

== Results ==
=== Men ===
Event	Winner	Second	Third
Indonesia, Jakarta | 23–26 February
Sprint; Details	Harrie Lavreysen (NED); 10.006/9.563	Kaiya Ota (JPN) +0.018/+0.090	Mikhail Yakovlev (ISR); 10.262/9.875
Keirin; Details	Harrie Lavreysen (NED)	Azizulhasni Awang (MAS)	Mikhail Yakovlev (ISR)
Omnium; Details	Tobias Hansen (DEN); 134 pts.	Campbell Stewart (NZL); 132 pts.	Sebastián Mora (ESP); 119 pts.
Elimination Race; Details	Eiya Hashimoto (JPN) (Team Bridgestone Cycling)	Jules Hesters (BEL)	Yoeri Havik (NED)
Team Sprint; Details	Australia; Thomas Cornish; Leigh Hoffman; Matthew Richardson; 42.599	Netherlands; Jeffrey Hoogland; Harrie Lavreysen; Roy van den Berg; 48.734	France; Florian Grengbo; Rayan Helal; Sebastien Vigier; 42.979
Team Pursuit; Details	Denmark; Tobias Hansen; Robin Skivild; Carl-Frederik Bevort; Rasmus Pedersen; 3:49.210	New Zealand; Aaron Gate; Campbell Stewart; Daniel Bridgwater; Nick Kergozou; 3:49.954	Great Britain; Oliver Wood; William Tidball; Rhys Britton; Charlie Tanfield; 3:51.601
Madison; Details	Germany; Roger Kluge; Theo Reinhardt; 97 pts.	Netherlands; Jan-Willem van Schip; Yoeri Havik; 83 pts.	New Zealand; Aaron Gate; Campbell Stewart; 59 pts.
Egypt, Cairo | 14–17 March
Sprint; Details	Harrie Lavreysen (NED); 9.948/10.019	Mikhail Yakovlev (ISR) +0.065/+1.843	Kaiya Ota (JPN); 10.185/+10.364
Keirin; Details	Shinji Nakano (JPN)	Shah Firdaus Sahrom (MAS)	Kaiya Ota (JPN)
Omnium; Details	Thomas Boudat (FRA); 139 pts.	Elia Viviani (ITA); 119 pts.	Roger Kluge (GER); 117 pts.
Elimination Race; Details	William Tidball (GBR)	Yoeri Havik (NED) (BEAT Cycling)	Michele Scartezzini (ITA)
Team Sprint; Details	Netherlands; Jeffrey Hoogland; Harrie Lavreysen; Roy van den Berg; 42.641	France; Timmy Gillion; Rayan Helal; Sebastien Vigier; 43.887	Japan; Yoshitaku Nagasako; Yuta Obara; Kaiya Ota; 43.361
Team Pursuit; Details	Denmark; Tobias Hansen; Robin Skivild; Carl-Frederik Bevort; Rasmus Pedersen; 3:52.312	France; Thomas Denis; Corentin Ermenault; Quentin Lafargue; Valentin Tabellion; 3:53.229	Germany; Benjamin Boos; Theo Reinhardt; Tobias Buck-Gramcko; Leon Rohde; 3:58.627
Madison; Details	Germany; Roger Kluge; Theo Reinhardt; 44 pts.	Netherlands; Jan-Willem van Schip; Vincent Hoppezak; 38 pts.	New Zealand; George Jackson; Thomas Sexton; 35 pts.
Canada, Milton | 20–23 April
Sprint; Details	Nicholas Paul (TTO); 10.141/10.143	Mateusz Rudyk (POL) +0.054/+0.068	Matthew Richardson (AUS); 10.257/11.393
Keirin; Details	Matthew Richardson (AUS)	Maximilian Dornbach (GER)	Nicholas Paul (TTO)
Omnium; Details	Donavan Grondin (FRA); 159 pts.	Tim Torn Teutenberg (GER); 146 pts.	Jan-Willem van Schip (NED); 142 pts.
Elimination Race; Details	Matthijs Büchli (NED) (BEAT Cycling)	Blake Agnoletto (AUS)	Erik Martorell (ESP)
Team Sprint; Details	Australia; Matthew Glaetzer; Leigh Hoffman; Matthew Richardson; 42.125	China; Guo Shuai; Xue Chenxi; Zhou Yu; 43.122	Great Britain; Harry Ledingham-Horn; Ed Lowe; Hayden Norris; 43.165
Team Pursuit; Details	Great Britain; Oliver Wood; Daniel Bigham; Josh Charlton; Michael Gill; 3:51.310	Italy; Francesco Lamon; Michele Scartezzini; Davide Boscaro; Manlio Moro; 3:52.840	France; Donavan Grondin; Benjamin Thomas; Thomas Boudat; Valentin Tabellion; 3:50.375
Madison; Details	Portugal; Ivo Oliveira; Iúri Leitão; 61 pts.	Netherlands; Yoeri Havik; Vincent Hoppezak (BEAT Cycling Club); 56 pts.	France; Thomas Boudat; Benjamin Thomas; 55 pts.

=== Women ===
Event	Winner	Second	Third
Indonesia, Jakarta | 23–26 February
Sprint; Details	Mathilde Gros (FRA); 11.208/11.015	Lea Friedrich (GER) +0.080/+0.921	Emma Finucane (GBR) +0.013/11.436/11.541
Keirin; Details	Mina Sato (JPN)	Mathilde Gros (FRA)	Fuko Umekawa (JPN) (Team Rakuten K Dreams)
Omnium; Details	Ally Wollaston (NZL); 158 pts.	Clara Copponi (FRA); 139 pts.	Neah Evans (GBR); 124 pts.
Elimination Race; Details	Ally Wollaston (NZL)	Neah Evans (GBR)	Marit Raaijmakers (NED)
Team Sprint; Details	Germany; Lea Friedrich; Pauline Grabosch; Emma Hinze; 46.613	China; Bao Shanju; Guo Yufang; Yuan Liying; 46.755	Great Britain; Lauren Bell; Sophie Capewell; Emma Finucane; 46.684
Team Pursuit; Details	New Zealand; Michaela Drummond; Ally Wollaston; Bryony Botha; Emily Shearman; 4:08.440	France; Victoire Berteau; Clara Copponi; Valentine Fortin; Marion Borras; 4:12.846	Great Britain; Sophie Lewis; Josie Knight; Anna Morris; Jessica Roberts; 4:13.975
Madison; Details	Denmark; Amalie Dideriksen; Julie Leth; 42 pts.	France; Valentine Fortin; Marion Borras; 32 pts.	Italy; Martina Fidanza; Silvia Zanardi; 26 pts.
Egypt, Cairo | 14–17 March
Sprint; Details	Emma Finucane (GBR); 11.500/11.440	Sophie Capewell (GBR) +0.003/+0.143	Emma Hinze (GER); 11.416/11.503
Keirin; Details	Mina Sato (JPN) (Team Rakuten K Dreams)	Nicky Degrendele (BEL)	Alessa-Catriona Propster (GER)
Omnium; Details	Ally Wollaston (NZL); 139 pts.	Victoire Berteau (FRA); 131 pts.	Amalie Dideriksen (DEN); 116 pts.
Elimination Race; Details	Jennifer Valente (USA)	Victoire Berteau (FRA)	Sophie Lewis (GBR)
Team Sprint; Details	China; Bao Shanju; Guo Yufang; Yuan Liying; 47.676	Germany; Lea Friedrich; Pauline Grabosch; Emma Hinze; 47.912	France; Mathilde Gros; Taky Marie-Divine Kouamé; Julie Michaux; 48.027
Team Pursuit; Details	France; Clara Copponi; Valentine Fortin; Marion Borras; Marie Le Net; 4:13.820	New Zealand; Bryony Botha; Ally Wollaston; Samantha Donnelly; Emily Shearman; 4:15.000	Germany; Franziska Brausse; Lisa Klein; Mieke Kroger; Laura Süßemilch; 4:18.324
Madison; Details	France; Clara Copponi; Valentine Fortin; 35 pt	Denmark; Amalie Dideriksen; Julie Leth; 34 pts.	New Zealand; Bryony Botha; Ally Wollaston; 24 pts.
Canada, Milton | 20–23 April
Sprint; Details	Kelsey Mitchell (CAN); 11.360/+0.015/11.453	Martha Bayona (COL) +0.024/11.384/+0.084	Luz Daniela Gaxiola (MEX); 11.416/11.503
Keirin; Details	Alessa-Catriona Propster (GER)	Martha Bayona (COL)	Katy Marchant (GBR)
Omnium; Details	Katie Archibald (GBR); 131 pts.	Elisa Balsamo (ITA); 110 pts.	Jennifer Valente (USA); 108 pts.
Elimination Race; Details	Anita Stenberg (NOR)	Jennifer Valente (USA)	Maike van der Duin (NED)
Team Sprint; Details	Mexico; Luz Daniela Gaxiola; Jessica Salazar; Yuli Verdugo; 47.001	Canada; Lauriane Genest; Kelsey Mitchell; Sarah Orban; 47.414	Poland; Marlena Karwacka; Urszula Los; Nikola Sibiak; 47.569
Team Pursuit; Details	Great Britain; Katie Archibald; Neah Evans; Megan Barker; Josie Knight; 4:12.539	Germany; Lena Reißner; Franziska Brausse; Mieke Kroger; Laura Süßemilch; 4:13.511	Canada; Sarah Van Dam; Maggie Coles-Lyster; Erin Attwell; Ariane Bonhomme; 4:15.961
Madison; Details	Belgium; Shari Bossuyt; Lotte Kopecky; 53 pt	Great Britain; Katie Archibald; Neah Evans; 44 pts.	Italy; Elisa Balsamo; Martina Fidanza; 41 pts.

== Medal table ==
Rank	Team	Gold	Silver	Bronze	Total
1	France	5	8	4	17
2	Great Britain	5	3	8	16
3	Germany	4	5	5	14
4	Netherlands	4	3	4	11
5	New Zealand	4	3	3	10
6	Denmark	4	1	1	6
7	Australia	3	1	1	5
8	Japan	2	1	3	6
9	BEAT Cycling	1	2	0	3
9	Belgium	1	2	0	3
9	China	1	2	0	3
12	Canada	1	1	1	3
12	United States	1	1	1	3
14	Mexico	1	0	1	2
14	Team Rakuten K Dreams	1	0	1	2
14	Trinidad and Tobago	1	0	1	2
17	Norway	1	0	0	1
17	Portugal	1	0	0	1
17	Team Bridgestone Cycling	1	0	0	1
20	Italy	0	3	3	6
21	Colombia	0	2	0	2
21	Malaysia	0	2	0	2
23	Israel	0	1	2	3
24	Poland	0	1	1	2
25	Spain	0	0	2	2
Totals (25 entries)		42	42	42	126
