= Track cycling at the 2026 Commonwealth Games – Men's team pursuit =

Cycling Track – Men's team pursuit at the 2026 Commonwealth Games
- Venue: Sir Chris Hoy Velodrome
- Dates: 30 July
- Competitors: 21 from 5 nations
- Winning time: 3:47.575

Medalists
gold medal	William Tidball; Henry Hobbs; Charlie Tanfield; Ethan Vernon; Josh Charlton	England
silver medal	Blake Agnoletto; Oliver Bleddyn; Conor Leahy; James Moriarty	Australia
bronze medal	Marshall Erwood; George Jackson; Daniel Morton; Thomas Sexton	New Zealand

The men's team pursuit at the 2026 Commonwealth Games was part of the cycling programme, and took place on 30 July 2026.

== Records ==
Prior to this competition, the existing world and Games records were as follows:

World Record	3:39.977	Denmark	Konya (Turkey)	2 February 2026
Commonwealth Games Record	3:47.575	New Zealand	London (United Kingdom)	29 June 2022

== Schedule ==
The schedule is as follows

All times are British Summer Time (UTC+1)

Date	Time	Round
Thursday 30 July 2026	10:55	Qualifying
Thursday 30 July 2026	17:20	Finals

== Results ==
=== Qualifying ===
The two fastest teams advanced to the gold medal final. The next two fastest teams advanced to the bronze medal final.

Rank	Nation	Riders	Time	Notes
1	Australia	Blake Agnoletto; Oliver Bleddyn; Conor Leahy; James Moriarty	3:48.78	QG
2	England	Josh Charlton; Henry Hobbs; Charlie Tanfield; Ethan Vernon	3:50.89	QG
3	New Zealand	Marshall Erwood; George Jackson; Daniel Morton; Thomas Sexton	3:53.38	QB
4	Wales	Rhys Britton; Rory Gravelle; William Roberts; William Salter	3:55.55	QB
5	Scotland	Michael Gill; Logan Maclean; Elliot Rowe; Tim Shoreman	3:56.87	

=== Finals ===
The results of the medal finals was as follows:

Rank	Nation	Riders	Time	Behind	Notes
Gold medal final
1st place, gold medalist(s)	England	William Tidball; Henry Hobbs; Charlie Tanfield; Ethan Vernon	3:47.092	-	GR
2nd place, silver medalist(s)	Australia	Blake Agnoletto; Oliver Bleddyn; Conor Leahy; James Moriarty	3:48.223	+1.131	
Bronze medal final
3rd place, bronze medalist(s)	New Zealand	Marshall Erwood; George Jackson; Daniel Morton; Thomas Sexton	3:52.310	-	
4	Wales	Rhys Britton; Rory Gravelle; William Roberts; William Salter	3:54.063	+1.753	
