= 2025 UCI Track Cycling World Championships – Men's team pursuit =

Men's team pursuit at the 2025 UCI Track Cycling World Championships
- Venue: Peñalolén Velodrome
- Location: Santiago, Chile
- Dates: 22–23 October
- Competitors: 69 from 16 nations
- Teams: 16
- Winning time: 3:43.915

Medalists
gold medal	Tobias Hansen; Niklas Larsen; Frederik Madsen; Rasmus Pedersen; Lasse Norman Leth	Denmark
silver medal	Oliver Bleddyn; Blake Agnoletto; Conor Leahy; James Moriarty; Liam Walsh	Australia
bronze medal	Thomas Sexton; Marshall Erwood; Keegan Hornblow; Nick Kergozou	New Zealand

The Men's team pursuit competition at the 2025 UCI Track Cycling World Championships was held on 22 and 23 October 2025.

== Results ==
=== Qualifying ===
The qualifying was started on 22 October at 12:31. The eight fastest teams advanced to the first round.

Rank	Nation	Time	Behind	Notes
1	Denmark; Tobias Hansen; Niklas Larsen; Lasse Norman Leth; Rasmus Pedersen	3:43.784		Q
2	Australia; Oliver Bleddyn; Blake Agnoletto; Conor Leahy; Liam Walsh	3:45.786	+2.002	Q
3	Great Britain; Matthew Bostock; William Tidball; Josh Charlton; Charlie Tanfield	3:49.001	+5.217	Q
4	New Zealand; Thomas Sexton; Marshall Erwood; Keegan Hornblow; Nick Kergozou	3:49.219	+5.435	Q
5	United States; Ashlin Barry; Grant Koontz; Graeme Frislie; Anders Johnson	3:50.346	+6.562	Q
6	Italy; Davide Boscaro; Renato Favero; Luca Giaimi; Francesco Lamon	3:51.055	+7.271	Q
7	Germany; Moritz Binder; Benjamin Boos; Felix Groß; Ben Jochum	3:51.321	+7.537	Q
8	Switzerland; Mats Poot; Alex Vogel; Luca Bühlmann; Noah Bögli	3:52.048	+8.264	Q
9	Belgium; Lindsay De Vylder; Fabio Van den Bossche; Jasper De Buyst; Noah Vandenbranden	3:53.552	+9.768	
10	France; Mathieu Dupé; Ellande Larronde; Erwan Besnier; Lucas Menanteau	3:53.712	+9.928	
11	Canada; Dylan Bibic; Chris Ernst; Mathias Guillemette; Sean Richardson	3:53.811	+10.027	
12	Spain; Xavier Cañellas; Álvaro Navas; Beñat Garaiar; Eñaut Urkaregi	3:56.472	+12.688	
13	Colombia; Juan Esteban Arango; Anderson Arboleda; Jordan Parra; Brayan Sánchez	3:58.659	+14.875	
14	Chile; Jacob Decar; Diego Rojas; Cristián Arriagada; Martín Mancilla	3:59.151	+15.367	
15	Japan; Naoki Kojima; Kazushige Kuboki; Shoki Kawano; Tetsuo Yamamoto	4:00.120	+16.336	
16	Poland; Daniel Staniszewski; Kacper Majewski; Piotr Maślak; Bartosz Rudyk	4:02.553	+18.769	

=== First round ===
The first round was started on 22 October at 19:18.

First round heats were held as follows:
Heat 1: 6th v 7th fastest
Heat 2: 5th v 8th fastest
Heat 3: 2nd v 3rd fastest
Heat 4: 1st v 4th fastest

The winners of heats three and four advanced to the gold medal race. The remaining six teams were ranked on time, from which the top two proceeded to the bronze medal race.

Rank	Heat	Nation	Time	Notes
1	1	Germany; Max-David Briese; Moritz Binder; Benjamin Boos; Felix Groß	3:49.002	
2	1	Italy; Davide Boscaro; Renato Favero; Luca Giaimi; Francesco Lamon	3:49.254	
1	2	United States; Ashlin Barry; Grant Koontz; Graeme Frislie; Anders Johnson	3:48.460	QB
2	2	Switzerland; Mats Poot; Alex Vogel; Noah Bögli; Pascal Tappeiner	3:50.076	
1	3	Australia; Oliver Bleddyn; Blake Agnoletto; Conor Leahy; James Moriarty	3:46.569	QG
2	3	Great Britain; Matthew Bostock; Josh Charlton; Michael Gill; Charlie Tanfield	3:51.61	
1	4	Denmark; Tobias Hansen; Niklas Larsen; Frederik Madsen; Rasmus Pedersen	3:45.874	QG
2	4	New Zealand; Thomas Sexton; Marshall Erwood; Keegan Hornblow; Nick Kergozou	3:48.985	QB

=== Finals ===
The finals were started on 23 October at 18:25.

Rank	Nation	Time	Behind	Notes
Gold medal race
1st place, gold medalist(s)	Denmark; Tobias Hansen; Niklas Larsen; Frederik Madsen; Rasmus Pedersen	3:43.915		
2nd place, silver medalist(s)	Australia; Oliver Bleddyn; Blake Agnoletto; Conor Leahy; James Moriarty	3:47.258	+3.343	
Bronze medal race
3rd place, bronze medalist(s)	New Zealand; Thomas Sexton; Marshall Erwood; Keegan Hornblow; Nick Kergozou	3:48.877		
4	United States; Ashlin Barry; Grant Koontz; Graeme Frislie; Anders Johnson	3:49.799	+0.922	
