= Cycling at the 2024 Summer Olympics – Men's team pursuit =

Men's team pursuit at the Games of the XXXIII Olympiad
- Olympic track cycling
- Venues: Vélodrome National de Saint-Quentin-en-Yvelines
- Dates: 5–7 August 2024
- Competitors: 41 from 10 nations
- Teams: 10
- Winning time: 3:42.067

Medalists
1st place, gold medalist(s)		Oliver Bleddyn; Conor Leahy; Kelland O'Brien; Sam Welsford	Australia
2nd place, silver medalist(s)		Daniel Bigham; Ethan Hayter; Charlie Tanfield; Ethan Vernon; Oliver Wood	Great Britain
3rd place, bronze medalist(s)		Simone Consonni; Filippo Ganna; Francesco Lamon; Jonathan Milan	Italy

The men's team pursuit event at the 2024 Summer Olympics took place from 5 to 7 August 2024 at the Vélodrome National de Saint-Quentin-en-Yvelines.

== Background ==
This will be the 26th appearance of the event, which has been held at every Summer Olympics since its introduction in 1908 except for 1912, when no track cycling was held.

== Competition format ==
A team pursuit race involves two teams of four cyclists. Each team starts at opposite sides of the track. There are two ways to win: finish 16 laps (4 km) before the other team does or catch the other team. The time for each team is determined by the third cyclist to cross the finish line; the fourth cyclist does not need to finish.

The tournament consists of three rounds:

- Qualifying round: Each team does a time trial for seeding. Only the top 4 teams are able to compete for the gold medal; the 5th place and lower teams can do no better than bronze.
- First round: Four heats of 2 teams each. The top 4 teams are seeded against each other (1 vs. 4, 2 vs. 3) while the bottom 4 teams are seeded against each other (5 vs. 8, 6 vs. 7). The winners of the top bracket advance to the gold medal final. The other 6 teams are ranked by time and advance to finals based on those rankings.
- Finals: Four finals, each with 2 teams. There is a gold medal final (gold and silver medals), a bronze medal final (bronze medal and 4th place), and 5th/6th and 7th/8th classification finals.

== Schedule ==
All times are Central European Time (UTC+2)

Date	Time	Round
5 August	17:27	Qualifying
6 August	19:14	First round
7 August	18:04	Finals

== Results ==
=== Qualifying ===
Rank	Nation	Time	Notes
1	Australia; Oliver Bleddyn; Sam Welsford; Conor Leahy; Kelland O'Brien	3:42.958	Q
2	Great Britain; Ethan Hayter; Oliver Wood; Daniel Bigham; Ethan Vernon	3:43.241	Q
3	Denmark; Tobias Hansen; Niklas Larsen; Carl-Frederik Bévort; Rasmus Pedersen	3:43.690	Q
4	Italy; Simone Consonni; Filippo Ganna; Francesco Lamon; Jonathan Milan	3:44.351	Q
5	France; Thomas Boudat; Benjamin Thomas; Thomas Denis; Valentin Tabellion	3:45.514	q
6	New Zealand; Aaron Gate; Keegan Hornblow; Tom Sexton; Campbell Stewart	3:45.616	q
7	Belgium; Lindsay De Vylder; Fabio Van den Bossche; Tuur Dens; Noah Vandenbranden	3:47.232	q
8	Canada; Dylan Bibic; Mathias Guillemette; Michael Foley; Carson Mattern	3:48.964	q
9	Germany; Roger Kluge; Tim Torn Teutenberg; Tobias Buck-Gramcko; Theo Reinhardt	3:50.083	
10	Japan; Shunsuke Imamura; Kazushige Kuboki; Eiya Hashimoto; Shinji Nakano	3:53.489	

=== First round ===
Heat	Rank	Nation	Time	Notes
1	1	New Zealand; Aaron Gate; Keegan Hornblow; Tom Sexton; Campbell Stewart	3:43.776	
1	2	Belgium; Lindsay De Vylder; Fabio Van den Bossche; Tuur Dens; Noah Vandenbranden	3:45.685	
2	1	France; Thomas Boudat; Benjamin Thomas; Thomas Denis; Valentin Tabellion	3:45.531	
2	2	Canada; Dylan Bibic; Mathias Guillemette; Michael Foley; Carson Mattern	3:49.245	
3	1	Great Britain; Ethan Hayter; Oliver Wood; Charlie Tanfield; Ethan Vernon	3:42.151	QG
3	2	Denmark; Tobias Hansen; Niklas Larsen; Carl-Frederik Bévort; Rasmus Pedersen	3:42.803	QB
4	1	Australia; Oliver Bleddyn; Sam Welsford; Conor Leahy; Kelland O'Brien	3:40.730	QG, WR
4	2	Italy; Simone Consonni; Filippo Ganna; Francesco Lamon; Jonathan Milan	3:43.205	QB

=== Finals ===
Rank	Nation	Time	Notes
Gold medal final
1st place, gold medalist(s)	Australia; Oliver Bleddyn; Sam Welsford; Conor Leahy; Kelland O'Brien	3:42.067	
2nd place, silver medalist(s)	Great Britain; Ethan Hayter; Daniel Bigham; Charlie Tanfield; Ethan Vernon	3:44.394	
Bronze medal final
3rd place, bronze medalist(s)	Italy; Simone Consonni; Filippo Ganna; Francesco Lamon; Jonathan Milan	3:44.197	
4	Denmark; Tobias Hansen; Niklas Larsen; Carl-Frederik Bévort; Rasmus Pedersen	3:46.138	
Fifth place final
5	New Zealand; Aaron Gate; Keegan Hornblow; Tom Sexton; Campbell Stewart	3:44.741	
6	France; Thomas Boudat; Benjamin Thomas; Thomas Denis; Valentin Tabellion	3:47.697	
Seventh place final
7	Canada; Dylan Bibic; Mathias Guillemette; Michael Foley; Carson Mattern	3:54.517	
	Belgium; Lindsay De Vylder; Fabio Van den Bossche; Tuur Dens; Noah Vandenbranden	DNF	
