= UCI Track Cycling Nations Cup =

Track cycling competition since 2021

- 2026 UCI Track World Cup

Race details
- Region: Worldwide
- Discipline: Track
- Organiser: Union Cycliste Internationale

History
- First edition: 2021
- Editions: 6 (as of 2026)
- First winner: Colombia
- Most recent: China

UCI Track Cycling Nations Cup is a season-long track cycling competition held over three rounds in different locations around the world. It was established in 2021 as the successor to the UCI Track Cycling World Cup.

In 2025, UCI announced the competition will be rebranded to a shorter version of its previous name, UCI Track World Cup starting from the 2026 edition, although the format of 3 rounds remain.

== Hosts ==
Times hosted
Hosts	Editions hosted
Canada Hong Kong	3
Australia Colombia	2
Egypt Great Britain Indonesia Malaysia Russia Turkey	1

== Overall winners ==
=== Nations ===
Year	Winner	Second	Third
2021	Colombia	Ukraine	Germany
2022	Italy	Colombia	Germany
2023	Great Britain	Germany	France
2024	Great Britain (2)	Japan	Germany
2025	Australia	Germany	Japan
2026	China	Japan	Netherlands

=== Men ===
==== Kilometer ====
Year	Winner	Second	Third
2021	(Colombia) Santiago Ramírez	(India) Ronaldo Laitonjam	(Trinidad and Tobago) Nicholas Paul
2022	(Colombia) Santiago Ramírez (2)	(France) Melvin Landerneau	(Colombia) Cristian Ortega

==== Keirin ====
Year	Winner	Second	Third
2021	(Colombia) Kevin Quintero	(Lithuania) Vasilijus Lendel	(Colombia) Santiago Ramírez
2022	(Colombia) Kevin Quintero	(Australia) Matthew Richardson	(Netherlands) Harrie Lavreysen
2023	(Colombia) Kevin Quintero (3)	(Australia) Matthew Richardson	(Malaysia) Shah Firdaus Sahrom
2024	(Japan) Kaiya Ota	(United Kingdom) Jack Carlin	(Netherlands) Jeffrey Hoogland
2025	(Malaysia) Shah Firdaus Sahrom	(France) Sébastien Vigier	(Japan) Shinji Nakano
2026	(Malaysia) Azizulhasni Awang	(Netherlands) Harrie Lavreysen	(United Kingdom) Matthew Richardson

==== Individual sprint ====
Year	Winner	Second	Third
2021	(Colombia) Kevin Quintero	(Colombia) Santiago Ramírez	(Lithuania) Vasilijus Lendel
2022	(Netherlands) Harrie Lavreysen	(Australia) Matthew Richardson	(Trinidad and Tobago) Nicholas Paul
2023	(Poland) Mateusz Rudyk	(Netherlands) Harrie Lavreysen	(Israel) Mikhail Yakovlev
2024	(Japan) Kaiya Ota	(Australia) Matthew Richardson	(Lithuania) Vasilijus Lendel
2025	(United Kingdom) Matthew Richardson	(United Kingdom) Harry Ledingham-Horn	(France) Rayan Helal
2026	(United Kingdom) Matthew Richardson (2)	(Netherlands) Harrie Lavreysen	(Australia) Leigh Hoffman

==== Team sprint ====
Year	Winner	Second	Third
2021	Ukraine	India	Canada
2022	China	Colombia	Netherlands
2023	China (2)	Great Britain	Australia
2024	Great Britain	China	Australia
2025	Great Britain (2)	Japan	Australia
2026	China (3)	Italy	Netherlands

==== Individual pursuit ====
Year	Winner	Second	Third
2021	(Romania) Daniel Crista	(Russia) Gleb Syritsa	(United States) Ashton Lambie
2022	(Italy) Davide Plebani	(Germany) Nicolas Heinrich	(Germany) Tobias Buck-Gramcko

==== Team pursuit ====
Year	Winner	Second	Third
2021	Russia	Colombia	Germany
2022	Italy	China	Germany
2023	Great Britain	France	Denmark
2024	Great Britain (2)	Japan	Italy
2025	Australia	United States	New Zealand
2026	China	New Zealand	Hong Kong

==== Madison ====
Year	Winner	Second	Third
2021	Ukraine	Austria	Belarus
2022	Italy	Mexico	Japan
2023	Germany	Netherlands	Portugal
2024	Portugal	Japan	New Zealand
2025	Spain	Netherlands	Belgium
2026	Germany (2)	Netherlands	Japan

==== Omnium ====
Year	Winner	Second	Third
2021	(Belarus) Yauheni Karaliok	(Romania) Daniel Crista	(Japan) Eiya Hashimoto
2022	(United States) Gavin Hoover	(Colombia) Juan Esteban Arango	(Germany) Tim Torn Teutenberg
2023	(Spain) Sebastián Mora	(France) Thomas Boudat	(Netherlands) Vincent Hoppezak
2024	(Canada) Dylan Bibic	(New Zealand) Aaron Gate	(Japan) Kazushige Kuboki
2025	(Netherlands) Yanne Dorenbos	(United States) Ashlin Barry	(Japan) Kazushige Kuboki
2026	(China) Wu Junjie	(Slovenia) Nejc Peterlin	(Japan) Naoki Kojima

==== Elimination race ====
Year	Winner	Second	Third
2021	(Trinidad and Tobago) Akil Campbell	(Italy) Carloalberto Giordani	(Japan) Eiya Hashimoto
2022	(Netherlands) Yoeri Havik	(Canada) Mathias Guillemette	(Germany) Tim Torn Teutenberg
2023	(Japan) Eiya Hashimoto	(Netherlands) Yoeri Havik	(Japan) Kazushige Kuboki
2024	(Canada) Dylan Bibic	(Japan) Shunsuke Imamura	(Italy) Michele Scartezzini
2025	(Belgium) Jules Hesters	(Denmark) Noah Wulff	(Austria) Tim Wafler
2026	(Italy) Matteo Fiorin	(Individual Neutral Athletes) Ilya Savekin	(Spain) Alvaro Navas

=== Women ===
==== 500 meters ====
Year	Winner	Second	Third
2021	(Colombia) Martha Bayona	(Malaysia) Anis Amira Rosidi	(Italy) Miriam Vece
2022	(Colombia) Martha Bayona (2)	(Italy) Miriam Vece	(Germany) Pauline Grabosch

==== Keirin ====
Year	Winner	Second	Third
2021	(Colombia) Martha Bayona	(Japan) Yuka Kobayashi	(Mexico) Yuli Verdugo
2022	(Colombia) Martha Bayona (2)	(Netherlands) Steffie van der Peet	(Netherlands) Laurine van Riessen
2023	(Japan) Mina Sato	(Germany) Alessa-Catriona Pröpster	(Colombia) Martha Bayona
2024	(France) Mathilde Gros	(United Kingdom) Emma Finucane	(Japan) Mina Sato
2025	(France) Mathilde Gros (2)	(Czech Republic) Veronika Jabornikova	(Japan) Mina Sato
2026	(China) Wang Lijuan	(China) Yuan Liying	(United Kingdom) Emma Finucane

==== Individual sprint ====
Year	Winner	Second	Third
2021	(Colombia) Martha Bayona	(Malaysia) Anis Amira Rosidi	(Russia) Anastasia Voynova
2022	(Colombia) Martha Bayona	(Netherlands) Laurine van Riessen	(Canada) Kelsey Mitchell
2023	(Colombia) Martha Bayona (3)	(United Kingdom) Emma Finucane	(United Kingdom) Sophie Capewell
2024	(France) Mathilde Gros	(United Kingdom) Emma Finucane	(Germany) Emma Hinze
2025	(China) Yuan Liying	(Authorised Neutral Athletes) Alina Lysenko	(Netherlands) Hetty van de Wouw
2026	(China) Yuan Liying (2)	(United Kingdom) Emma Finucane	(Netherlands) Hetty van de Wouw

==== Team sprint ====
Year	Winner	Second	Third
2021	Colombia	Russia	Hong Kong
2022	Netherlands	Canada	China
2023	China	Great Britain	Mexico
2024	Poland	Mexico	Great Britain
2025	Netherlands (2)	Great Britain	Germany
2026	China (2)	Netherlands	Australia

==== Individual pursuit ====
Year	Winner	Second	Third
2021	(United States) Lily Williams	(Republic of Ireland) Kelly Murphy	(Belarus) Hanna Tserakh
2022	(China) Susu Wang	(China) Siqi Guan	(Italy) Letizia Paternoster

==== Team pursuit ====
Year	Winner	Second	Third
2021	Canada	Ireland	Poland
2022	Italy	China	United States
2023	Great Britain	Germany	Canada
2024	New Zealand	China	United Kingdom
2025	Germany	New Zealand	Australia
2026	New Zealand (2)	China	Germany

==== Madison ====
Year	Winner	Second	Third
2021	Belarus	Brazil	Poland
2022	Italy	United States	Australia
2023	Great Britain	Italy	France
2024	Italy (2)	Great Britain	Switzerland
2025	Denmark	Germany	New Zealand
2026	Japan	Netherlands	Hong Kong

==== Omnium ====
Year	Winner	Second	Third
2021	(Austria) Verena Eberhardt	(Poland) Daria Pikulik	(Portugal) Maria Martins
2022	(United States) Jennifer Valente	(Japan) Yumi Kajihara	(Mexico) Victoria Velasco
2023	(New Zealand) Ally Wollaston	(Norway) Anita Stenberg	(United States) Jennifer Valente
2024	(United Kingdom) Katie Archibald	(Japan) Tsuyaka Uchino	(Japan) Yumi Kajihara
2025	(New Zealand) Ally Wollaston (2)	(Netherlands) Lisa van Belle	(Authorised Neutral Athletes) Valeria Valgonen
2026	(Norway) Anita Stenberg	(Mexico) Yareli Acevedo	(Japan) Tsuyaka Uchino

==== Elimination race ====
Year	Winner	Second	Third
2021	(Austria) Verena Eberhardt	(Brazil) Alice Tamirys Leite De Melo	(Mexico) Yareli Acevedo
2022	(United States) Jennifer Valente	(Switzerland) Michelle Andres	(Spain) Tania Calvo
2023	(Norway) Anita Stenberg	(United States) Jennifer Valente	(France) Victoire Berteau
2024	(Norway) Anita Stenberg (2)	(United States) Jennifer Valente	(Spain) Laura Cordero
2025	(Mexico) Yareli Acevedo	(Netherlands) Lisa van Belle	(Japan) Mizuki Ikeda
2026	(Norway) Anita Stenberg (3)	(Hong Kong) Lee Sze Wing	(Mexico) Yareli Acevedo

== Medal table ==
Updated after the 2025 edition.

Rank	Team	Gold	Silver	Bronze	Total
1	Great Britain	21	11	16	48
2	Germany	16	17	18	51
3	Netherlands	15	16	11	42
4	France	14	18	14	46
5	Colombia	13	13	15	41
6	Japan	13	13	13	39
7	New Zealand	13	10	12	35
8	Italy	12	17	10	39
9	Australia	11	11	9	31
10	United States	8	6	10	24
11	Canada	8	4	9	21
12	Trinidad and Tobago	8	0	3	11
13	Russia	6	9	3	18
14	China	6	5	6	17
15	Team Rakuten K Dreams	6	4	4	14
16	Denmark	6	3	4	13
17	Belgium	5	5	4	14
18	Belarus	4	2	1	7
19	Mexico	3	4	5	12
20	Portugal	3	2	1	6
21	Poland	2	4	6	12
22	Malaysia	2	2	0	4
23	Ireland	2	1	4	7
24	Hong Kong	2	1	0	3
25	Romania	2	0	0	2
26	Spain	1	6	6	13
27	BEAT Cycling	1	4	0	5
28	Norway	1	2	1	4
29	Marathon–Tula	1	1	2	4
30	Sime Darby Foundation	1	1	1	3
30	Team Inspired	1	1	1	3
32	Dream Seeker Racing Team	1	0	1	2
32	Team Bridgestone Cycling	1	0	1	2
34	Austria	0	3	2	5
35	Ukraine	0	3	1	4
36	Israel	0	1	2	3
36	Lithuania	0	1	2	3
–	Individual Neutral Athletes	0	1	2	3
38	Czech Republic	0	1	0	1
38	Henan Bodywrap Cycling Team	0	1	0	1
38	Indonesia	0	1	0	1
38	Scotland	0	1	0	1
38	Suriname	0	1	0	1
38	Thailand	0	1	0	1
44	Chile	0	0	3	3
44	Switzerland	0	0	3	3
46	Greece	0	0	1	1
46	Wales	0	0	1	1
Totals (47 entries)		209	208	208	625
