= 2025 UCI Track Cycling World Championships =

Cycling world championships

- Venue: Santiago, Chile
- Date: 22–26 October
- Velodrome: Peñalolén Velodrome
- Events: 22

The 122nd UCI Track Cycling World Championships were held in Santiago, Chile from October 22 to 26, 2025. The event was organized by the Union Cycliste Internationale (UCI) in conjunction with the Chilean National Sports Cycling Federation (Federación Deportiva Nacional de Ciclismo de Chile).

The championships were originally awarded to San Juan, Argentina, but the Argentine cycling federation relinquished hosting rights due to financial difficulties.

All competitions were held at the Peñalolén Velodrome in the Chilean capital.

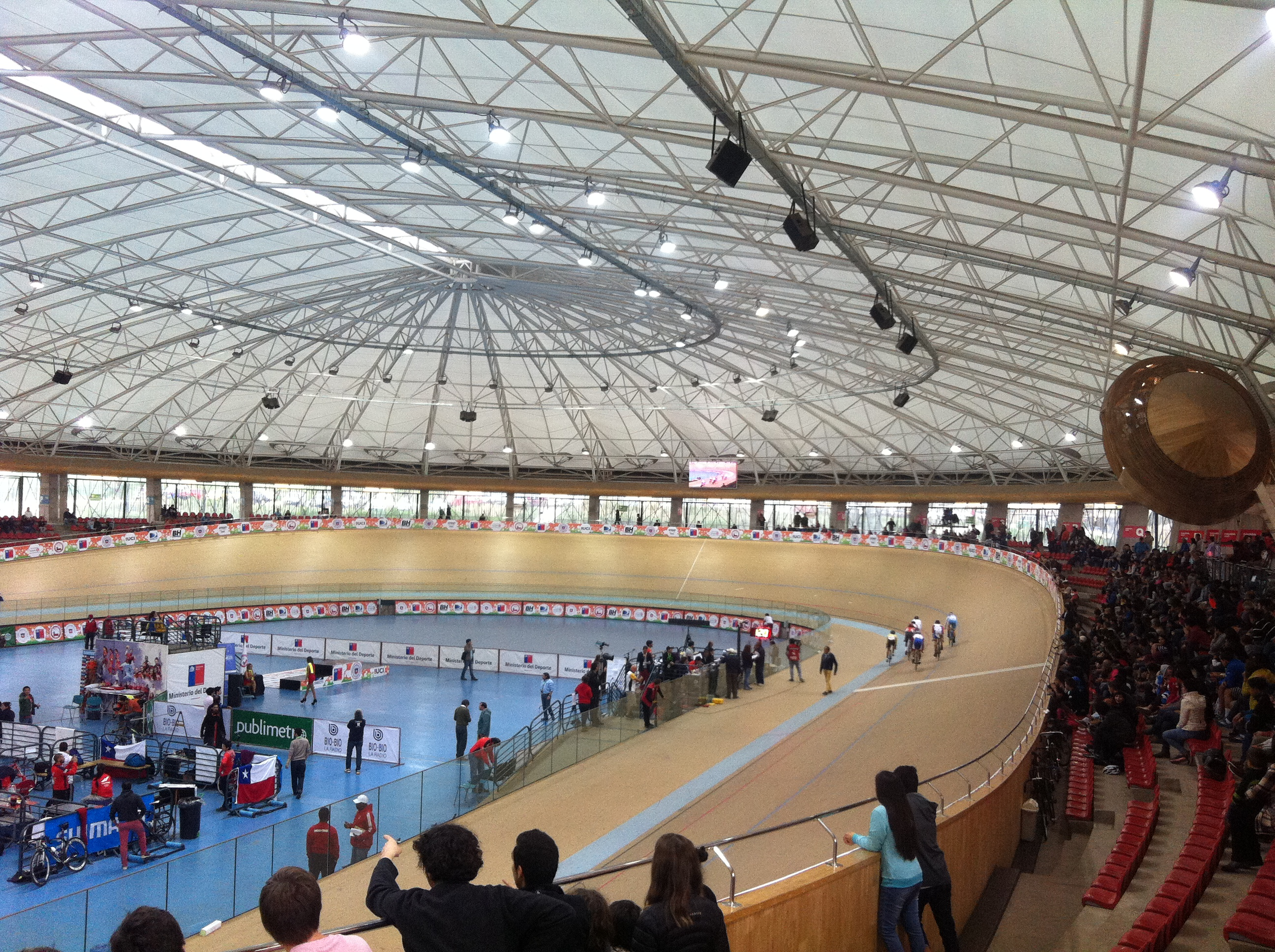
Velódromo Peñalolén in Santiago

== Schedule ==
A total of 22 events were held, with 11 events each for men and women.

All times are local UTC−3.

Date	Time	Event
22 October	11:00	Women's team pursuit qualifying
22 October	11:00	Men's team pursuit qualifying
22 October	11:00	Women's team sprint qualifying
22 October	11:00	Men's team sprint qualifying
22 October	18:30	Women's team sprint first round
22 October	18:30	Men's team sprint first round
22 October	18:30	Women's scratch final
22 October	18:30	Men's team pursuit first round
22 October	18:30	Women's team sprint final
22 October	18:30	Men's team sprint final
23 October	11:00	Men's keirin first round
23 October	11:00	Women's sprint qualifying
23 October	11:00	Men's keirin repechages
23 October	11:00	Women's sprint 1/16 final
23 October	11:00	Men's keirin second round
23 October	11:00	Women's sprint 1/8 final
23 October	17:30	Women's team pursuit first round
23 October	17:30	Women's sprint quarterfinals
23 October	17:30	Men's keirin third round
23 October	17:30	Men's team pursuit final
23 October	17:30	Women's elimination race
23 October	17:30	Men's keirin final
23 October	17:30	Men's scratch final
23 October	17:30	Women's team pursuit final
24 October	11:00	Men's time trial qualifying
24 October	11:00	Women's omnium scratch race
24 October	11:00	Men's individual pursuit qualifying
24 October	11:00	Women's omnium tempo race
24 October	17:00	Men's points race
24 October	17:00	Women's sprint semifinals
24 October	17:00	Women's omnium elimination race
24 October	17:00	Men's time trial final
24 October	17:00	Men's individual pursuit final
24 October	17:00	Women's sprint finals
24 October	17:00	Women's omnium points race

Date	Time	Event
25 October	11:00	Women's time trial qualifying
25 October	11:00	Men's sprint qualifying
25 October	11:00	Men's omnium scratch race
25 October	11:00	Men's sprint 1/16 final
25 October	11:00	Women's individual pursuit qualifying
25 October	11:00	Men's sprint 1/8 final
25 October	11:00	Men's omnium tempo race
25 October	17:30	Women's time trial final
25 October	17:30	Men's sprint quarterfinals
25 October	17:30	Women's madison
25 October	17:30	Men's omnium elimination race
25 October	17:30	Women's individual pursuit final
25 October	17:30	Men's omnium, points race
26 October	11:00	Men's sprint semifinals
26 October	11:00	Women's keirin first round
26 October	11:00	Women's keirin repechages
26 October	13:30	Women's keirin second round
26 October	13:30	Men's sprint final
26 October	13:30	Women's points race
26 October	13:30	Women's keirin third round
26 October	13:30	Men's elimination race
26 October	13:30	Women's keirin final
26 October	13:30	Men's madison

== Medal summary ==
Events with a grey background are non-Olympic events.

=== Medal table ===
* Host nation (Chile)

Rank	Nation	Gold	Silver	Bronze	Total
1	Netherlands	9	2	2	13
2	Great Britain	4	8	2	14
3	Italy	2	0	1	3
4	Denmark	1	2	2	5
5	Japan	1	2	0	3
6	Germany	1	1	0	2
7	Belgium	1	0	2	3
8	Ireland	1	0	0	1
8	Mexico	1	0	0	1
8	Spain	1	0	0	1
11	Australia	0	2	3	5
12	France	0	2	1	3
13	New Zealand	0	1	4	5
14	United States	0	1	2	3
–	Neutral athletes	0	1	1	2
15	Colombia	0	0	1	1
15	Portugal	0	0	1	1
Totals (16 entries)		22	22	22	66

=== Men ===
Event	Gold	Silver	Bronze
Individual pursuit	Josh Charlton; Great Britain	Rasmus Pedersen; Denmark	Anders Johnson; United States
Team pursuit	Denmark; Tobias Hansen; Niklas Larsen; Rasmus Pedersen; Frederik Rodenberg; Lasse Norman Leth	Australia; Blake Agnoletto; Oliver Bleddyn; Conor Leahy; James Moriarty; Liam Walsh	New Zealand; Marshall Erwood; Keegan Hornblow; Nick Kergozou; Thomas Sexton
Sprint	Harrie Lavreysen; Netherlands	Matthew Richardson; Great Britain	Leigh Hoffman; Australia
Team sprint	Netherlands; Jeffrey Hoogland; Harrie Lavreysen; Roy van den Berg	Great Britain; Matthew Richardson; Joseph Truman; Hamish Turnbull; Harry Ledingham-Horn	Australia; Daniel Barber; Ryan Elliott; Leigh Hoffman
Keirin	Harrie Lavreysen; Netherlands	Leigh Hoffman; Australia	Jeffrey Hoogland; Netherlands
Madison	Belgium; Lindsay De Vylder; Fabio Van den Bossche	Great Britain; Mark Stewart; Josh Tarling	Denmark; Niklas Larsen; Lasse Norman Leth
Omnium	Albert Torres; Spain	Kazushige Kuboki; Japan	Lindsay De Vylder; Belgium
Scratch	Moritz Augenstein; Germany	Yanne Dorenbos; Netherlands	Iúri Leitão; Portugal
Points race	Josh Tarling; Great Britain	Peter Moore; United States	Clément Petit; France
Elimination	Elia Viviani; Italy	Campbell Stewart; New Zealand	Yoeri Havik; Netherlands
1 km time trial	Harrie Lavreysen; Netherlands	Jeffrey Hoogland; Netherlands	Joseph Truman; Great Britain

=== Women ===
Event	Gold	Silver	Bronze
Individual pursuit	Anna Morris; Great Britain	Josie Knight; Great Britain	Chloé Dygert; United States
Team pursuit	Italy; Martina Alzini; Martina Fidanza; Vittoria Guazzini; Federica Venturelli; Chiara Consonni	Germany; Franziska Brauße; Messane Bräutigam; Lisa Klein; Laura Süßemilch; Mieke Kröger	Great Britain; Megan Barker; Josie Knight; Maddie Leech; Anna Morris; Jessica Roberts
Sprint	Hetty van de Wouw; Netherlands	Mina Sato; Japan	Alina Lysenko; Neutral athlete
Team sprint	Netherlands; Kimberly Kalee; Hetty van de Wouw; Steffie van der Peet	Great Britain; Emma Finucane; Iona Moir; Rhianna Parris-Smith	Australia; Alessia McCaig; Molly McGill; Kristine Perkins; Liliya Tatarinoff
Keirin	Mina Sato; Japan	Emma Finucane; Great Britain	Stefany Cuadrado; Colombia
Madison	Great Britain; Katie Archibald; Madelaine Leech	France; Victoire Berteau; Marion Borras	Italy; Chiara Consonni; Vittoria Guazzini
Omnium	Lorena Wiebes; Netherlands	Marion Borras; France	Amalie Dideriksen; Denmark
Scratch	Lorena Wiebes; Netherlands	Amalie Dideriksen; Denmark	Prudence Fowler; New Zealand
Points race	Yareli Acevedo; Mexico	Anna Morris; Great Britain	Bryony Botha; New Zealand
Elimination	Lara Gillespie; Ireland	Katie Archibald; Great Britain	Hélène Hesters; Belgium
1 km time trial	Hetty van de Wouw; Netherlands	Yana Burlakova; Neutral athlete	Ellesse Andrews; New Zealand
