= Marshall Erwood =

New Zealand track cyclist

Personal information
- Born: 22 February 2005 (age 21) Invercargill, New Zealand

Cycling career
- Sport: Cycling
- Disciplines: Track; Road
- Role: Rider

Professional team
- 2025: MitoQ–NZ Cycling Project
Medal record
Men's track cycling
Representing New Zealand
World Championships
Bronze medal – third place	2025 Santiago	Team pursuit
Commonwealth Games
Bronze medal – third place	2026 Glasgow	Team pursuit

Marshall Erwood (born 22 February 2005) is a New Zealand track and road cyclist. He rides for MitoQ–NZ Cycling Project. He was a bronze medalist at the 2025 UCI Track Cycling World Championships and 2026 Commonwealth Games in the men's team pursuit.

== Career ==
Erwood is from Invercargill in the Southland Region of New Zealand. He was selected for the 2023 UCI World Junior Track Championships.

Erwood was runner-up at the New Zealand under-19 men's national road championship in 2023. At the national track championships that year, he won the trophy for the most points by an under-19 rider after winning the 1000m time trial, the scratch and elimination races, as well as riding with Jesse Willis and Magnus Jamieson to win the under -19 team sprint. With Jamieson and Willis and Tom Kerr he finished second in the senior men's team pursuit. Erwood was also second in the individual pursuit and points race. At the Oceania Championships in 2023 he won the U19 kilo time trial final and paired with Maui Morrison to win the U19 25 km madison.

He was a silver medalist in the team pursuit at the 2025 Oceania Track Championships in Brisbane in February 2025. He also won a silver medalist in the elimination race at the Championships. He competed on the road with the MitoQ NZ Cycling Project team in the United States in 2025.

In October 2025, he won a bronze medal at the 2025 UCI Track Cycling World Championships in the men's team pursuit in Santiago, Chile, alongside Keegan Hornblow, Tom Sexton and Nick Kergozou, winning the bronze medal ride-off against the United States with their best time of the competition of 3:48.877 seconds.

In July 2026, he was part of the new Zealand team pursuit that won a won a bronze medal in the team pursuit at the 2026 Commonwealth Games, defeating Wales in the bronze medal race.

== Major results ==
2025
3rd Team pursuit, UCI Track World Championships
