= Keegan Hornblow =

New Zealand cyclist (born 2001)

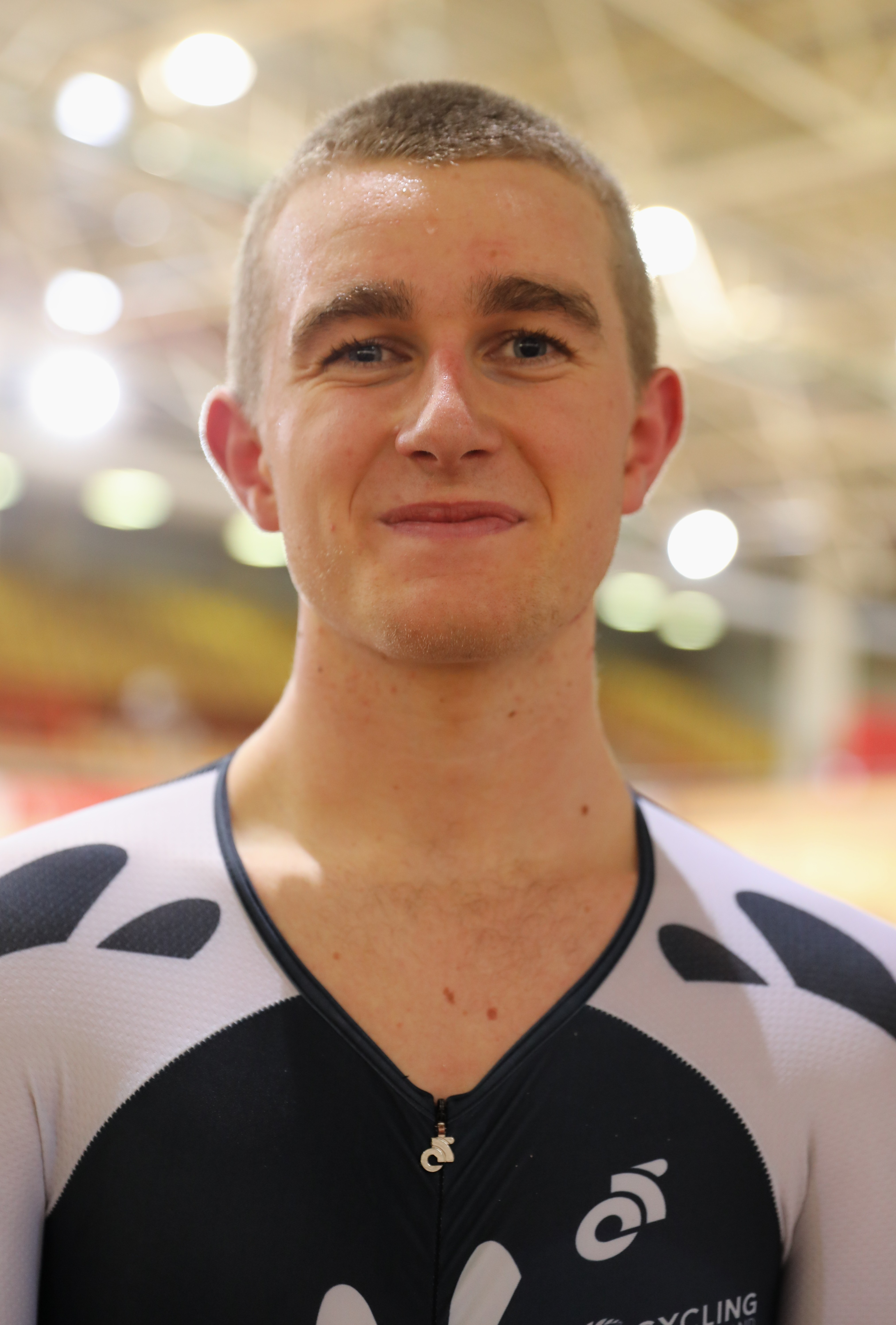
- Hornblow in 2019

Personal information
- Born: 25 October 2001 (age 25)

Cycling career
- Sport: Cycling
- Current team: Coupland's Bakeries–Booth's Group Team
- Disciplines: Track, Road
- Role: Rider

Amateur teams
- 2019: Skoda–Fruzio
- 2020: CycleHouse Racing
- 2021: Fruzio ILABB Devo
- 2022: SmartDry
- 2022–: Coupland's Bakeries–Booth's Group Team

Professional teams
- 2022: Bolton Equities Black Spoke Pro Cycling (stagiaire)
- 2023: Bolton Equities Black Spoke (stagiaire)
Medal record
Men's track cycling
Representing New Zealand
World Championships
Bronze medal – third place	2025 Santiago	Team pursuit
Commonwealth Games
Bronze medal – third place	2026 Glasgow	Team pursuit

Keegan Hornblow (born 25 October 2001) is a New Zealand track cyclist. He competed in the team pursuit at the 2024 Summer Olympics and won bronze medals in the team pursuit at the 2025 Track World Championships and 2026 Commonwealth Games.

== Early life ==
He is from Nelson, New Zealand, where he attended Nelson College.

== Career ==
He rode for New Zealand at the 2019 UCI Junior Track Cycling World Championships in Frankfurt, Germany. However, with the COVID-19 pandemic limiting track racing options he focused on road racing. He was runner-up in the U23 New Zealand National Road Race Championships in 2021 and 2022. That year, he finished third in the New Zealand National Time Trial Championships in the U23 race. Riding for Team Couplands he won stage two of the New Zealand Cycle Classic in 2022.

He made his senior debut riding the New Zealand team pursuit at the UCI Nations Cup in Cairo in March 2023. He competed for New Zealand at the UCI Oceania Track Cycling Championships in February 2024. He was selected for the 2024 Summer Olympics in Paris where he competed in the team pursuit.

In October 2025, he won a bronze medal at the 2025 UCI Track Cycling World Championships in the men's team pursuit in Santiago, Chile, alongside Marshall Erwood, Tom Sexton and Nick Kergozou, winning the bronze medal ride-off against the United States with their best time of the competition of 3:48.877 seconds.

Competing at the 2026 Commonwealth Games he rode with the New Zealand team pursuit, where they ultimately won the bronze medal.

== Personal life ==
After moving to Cambridge, New Zealand he shared a flat with fellow New Zealand cyclist Shaane Fulton.

== Major results ==
=== Track ===
2022
2nd Team pursuit, Oceania Championships
National Championships

2nd Individual pursuit
2nd Elimination

2023
Oceania Championships

2nd Team pursuit
3rd Individual pursuit
3rd Madison

2024
Oceania Championships

1st Team pursuit
3rd Points race
3rd Madison

1st Team pursuit, National Championships
3rd Team pursuit, UCI Nations Cup, Hong Kong
2025
3rd Team pursuit, UCI World Championships

=== Road ===
2020
1st Prologue (TTT) Tour of Southland
2022
1st Critèrium del Vallès
3rd Time trial, Oceania Under-23 Championships
3rd Time trial, National Under-23 Championships
5th Overall New Zealand Cycle Classic

1st Stage 2

2023
6th Time trial, Oceania Under-23 Championships
6th Schaal Sels
7th Omloop Mandel-Leie-Schelde
2025
5th Road race, National Championships
