= George Jackson (cyclist) =

New Zealand cyclist

Personal information
- Born: 20 February 2000 (age 26) Wellington, New Zealand
- Height: 1.89 m (6 ft 2 in)
- Weight: 74 kg (163 lb)

Cycling career
- Sport: Cycling
- Current team: Burgos Burpellet BH
- Disciplines: Road; track
- Role: Rider

Amateur teams
- 2017–2018: Team Skoda Racing
- 2019: Central Roofing–Revolution Cycling
- 2020–2021: New Zealand Cycling Project

Professional teams
- 2022: MitoQ–NZ Cycling Project
- 2023: Bolton Equities Black Spoke
- 2024–: Burgos BH

Major wins
- Stage races Tour of Taihu Lake (2023)
Medal record
Men's track cycling
Representing New Zealand
Commonwealth Games
Bronze medal – third place	2026 Glasgow	Men's points race
Bronze medal – third place	2026 Glasgow	Men's team pursuit

George Jackson (born 20 February 2000) is a New Zealand racing cyclist, who currently rides for UCI ProTeam Burgos Burpellet BH.

== Major results ==
=== Road ===
2021
1st Sprints classification, Tour of Southland
2022
Tour of Southland

1st Mountains classification
1st Prologue (TTT)

1st Mountains classification, Joe Martin Stage Race
7th Overall New Zealand Cycle Classic
2023 (5 pro wins)
1st Overall Tour of Taihu Lake

1st Points classification
1st Young rider classification
1st Stages 3 & 4

1st Stage 3 Tour de Langkawi
1st Stage 1 Tour of Hainan
2nd Criterium, National Championships
6th Road race, Oceania Road Championships
7th Overall Tour du Loir-et-Cher

=== Track ===
2018
1st Team pursuit, UCI World Junior Championships
2021
1st Scratch, National Championships
2022
2nd Omnium, National Championships
2023
Oceania Championships

1st Points race
2nd Scratch
2nd Team pursuit
2nd Madison (with Tom Sexton)

2nd Madison, National Championships (with Corbin Strong)
3rd Madison, UCI Nations Cup, Cairo (with Tom Sexton)
2026
Glasgow Commonwealth Games

3rd Men's points race
3rd Men's team pursuit
