= Liam Walsh (cyclist) =

Australian track cyclist (born 2001)

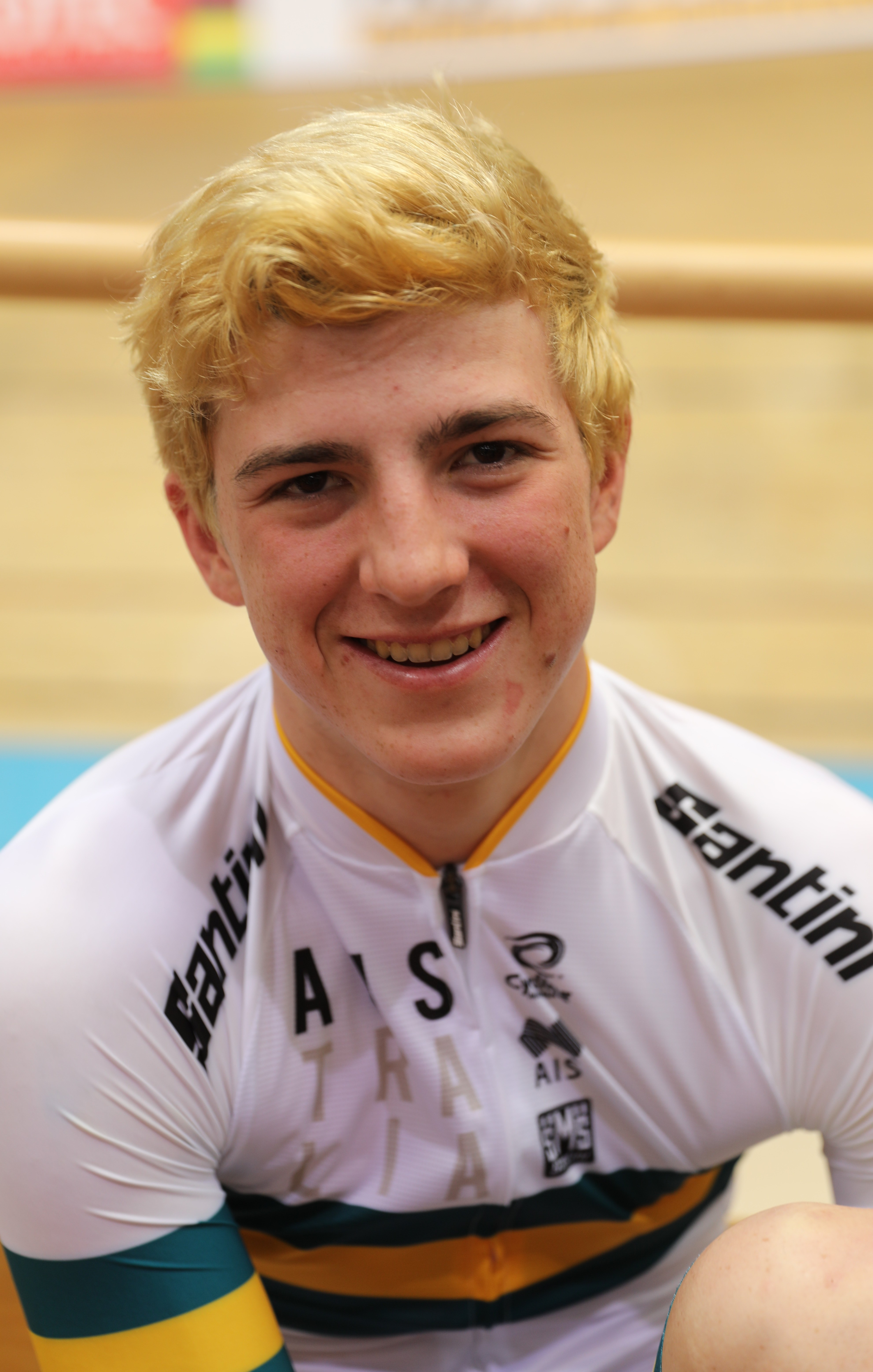
- Walsh in 2019

Personal information
- Born: 29 May 2001 (age 25) Brisbane, Australia
- Height: 1.82 m (6 ft 0 in)
- Weight: 80 kg (176 lb)

Cycling career
- Sport: Cycling
- Current team: CCACHE x BODYWRAP
- Disciplines: Track; Road
- Role: Rider

Amateur teams
- 2020: Futuro Pro Cycling
- 2021–2022: Giant Racing Team

Professional teams
- 2023–2024: Team BridgeLane
- 2025–: CCACHE x BODYWRAP
Medal record
Men's track cycling
Representing Australia
World Championships
Silver medal – second place	2025 Santiago	Team pursuit

Liam Walsh (born 29 May 2001) is an Australian road and track cyclist, who currently rides for UCI Continental team CCACHE x BODYWRAP.

== Major results ==
=== Track ===
2022
Oceanian Championships

3rd Elimination
3rd Team pursuit

2023
Oceanian Championships

2nd Madison (with Graeme Frislie)
3rd Team pursuit

2nd Six Days of Fiorenzuola (with Peter Moore)
2024
National Championships

1st Omnium
1st Scratch

2nd Team pursuit, Oceanian Championships
2025
Oceanian Championships

1st Team pursuit
3rd Madison (with Declan Trezise)

1st Team pursuit, UCI Nations Cup
2nd Team pursuit, UCI World Championships

=== Road ===
2022
10th Road race, Oceanian Championships
2023 (1 pro win)
1st Road race, Oceanian Championships
2024 (1 pro win)
1st Paris–Troyes
1st Stage 6 Tour of Southland (New Zealand national tour)
3rd Ruddervoorde Koerse (Belgium national tour)
2025 (4 pro wins)
Tour de Gyeongnam

1st Stages 4 & 5

1st Stage 3 Czech Tour
1st Stage 8 Tour of Japan
3rd Road race, National Championships
2026 (1 pro win)
1st Stage 3 Tour de Gyeongnam
