= Wang Lijuan =

Chinese cyclist (born 2003)

Personal information
- Born: 17 April 2003 (age 23)

Cycling career
- Sport: Cycling
- Discipline: Track cycling
- Role: Rider
- Rider type: Sprinter
Medal record
Women's track cycling
Representing China
Asian Games
Gold medal – first place	2026 Aichi–Nagoya	Team sprint
Silver medal – second place	2026 Aichi–Nagoya	Keirin
Asian Championships
Gold medal – first place	2024 New Delhi	Sprint
Gold medal – first place	2024 New Delhi	Team sprint
Gold medal – first place	2026 Tagaytay	Team sprint
Silver medal – second place	2026 Tagaytay	Keirin
Bronze medal – third place	2026 Tagaytay	Sprint

Wang Lijuan (Chinese: 王丽娟; born 17 April 2003) is a Chinese track cyclist who competes in sprinting events.

== Career ==
In March 2026, she competed at the 2026 Asian Track Cycling Championships and won a gold medal in the team sprint event with a time of 46.806 seconds. She also won a silver medal in the keirin and a bronze medal in the sprint. The next month during the 2026 UCI Track World Cup stop in Nilai, Malaysia, she won a gold medal in the keirin event, her first individual World Cup gold medal. In September 2026, she competed at the 2026 Asian Games and won a gold medal in the team sprint with an Asian Games record time of 45.370 seconds. She also won a silver medal in the keirin.
