= Blake Agnoletto =

Australian track cyclist (born 2002)

Personal information
- Born: 21 October 2002 (age 23) Bendigo, Australia
- Height: 1.79 m (5 ft 10 in)
- Weight: 69 kg (152 lb)

Cycling career
- Sport: Cycling
- Current team: Groupama–FDJ United Continental Team
- Disciplines: Track; Road
- Role: Rider

Amateur teams
- 2019: Butterfields9–Appselec p/b VDR
- 2020–2022: InForm TM Insight MAKE
- 2022: Blackburn CC

Professional teams
- 2023–2024: ARA Skip Capital
- 2025: Atom 6 Bikes–Decca Continental Team
- 2025–: Équipe Continentale Groupama–FDJ
Medal record
Men's track cycling
Representing Australia
World Championships
Silver medal – second place	2025 Santiago	Team pursuit

Blake Agnoletto (born 21 October 2002) is an Australian road and track cyclist, who currently rides for UCI Continental team Groupama–FDJ United Continental Team.

On the road, he has notably won the 2025 Melbourne to Warrnambool Classic and was the 2024 Australian under-23 criterium champion.

On the track, Agnoletto has won two national titles; one in the Madison and one in the team pursuit.

== Major results ==
=== Track ===
2022
National Championships

1st Madison (with Kelland O'Brien)
2nd Madison
3rd Elimination
3rd Individual pursuit

Oceanian Championships

2nd Scratch
3rd Team pursuit
3rd Madison

2023
1st Team pursuit, Oceanian Championships
National Championships

1st Madison (with Kelland O'Brien)
2nd Points race
3rd Team pursuit

2nd Elimination, UCI Nations Cup, Milton
2024
UCI Nations Cup

2nd Elimination, Adelaide
2nd Team pursuit, Adelaide

National Championships

2nd Omnium
2nd Madison

UCI Champions League

3rd Elimination, Apeldoorn I
3rd Elimination, Apeldoorn II
3rd Elimination, London I

2025
Oceanian Championships

1st Elimination
2nd Madison

1st Team pursuit, UCI Nations Cup, Konya
2nd Team pursuit, UCI World Championships

=== Road ===
2018
2nd Criterium, National Junior Championships
2023
1st Stage 4 (TTT) Tour of Poyang Lake II
2nd Criterium, National Under-23 Championships
3rd Overall Tour of Binzhou
9th Gullegem Koerse
10th Ronde van Overijssel
2024
1st Criterium, National Under-23 Championships
2025
1st Melbourne to Warrnambool Classic
1st Stage 2 SA Kick It
2nd Omloop van het Waasland
3rd Omloop der Kempen
