= Conor Leahy =

Australian track cyclist (born 1999)

Conor Leahy OAM
Personal information
- Born: 16 April 1999 (age 27) Perth, Australia
- Height: 1.89 m (6 ft 2 in)

Cycling career
- Sport: Cycling
- Current team: Team BridgeLane
- Disciplines: Track; Road
- Role: Rider

Amateur team
- 2019–2022: InForm TM Insight MAKE

Professional team
- 2023: Team BridgeLane

Major wins
- Track Olympic Games Team pursuit (2024)
Medal record
Men's track cycling
Representing Australia
Olympic Games
Gold medal – first place	2024 Paris	Team pursuit
World Championships
Silver medal – second place	2025 Santiago	Team pursuit
Commonwealth Games
Bronze medal – third place	2022 Birmingham	Individual pursuit
Bronze medal – third place	2022 Birmingham	Team pursuit

Conor Leahy OAM (born 16 April 1999) is an Australian road and track cyclist, who last rode for UCI Continental team Team BridgeLane. He won the gold medal in the team pursuit at the 2024 Summer Olympics.

He became a double Commonwealth medalist at the 2022 Commonwealth Games in Birmingham, where he claimed bronze in both the individual and team pursuits.

== Major results ==
=== Road ===
2021
2nd Time trial, National Under-23 Championships
2022
3rd Time trial, National Championships
4th Time trial, Oceanian Championships
2026 (1 pro win)
1st Time trial, Oceanian Championships
5th Time trial, National Championships

=== Track ===
2017
Oceanian Championships

3rd Individual pursuit
3rd Team pursuit

3rd Madison, National Championships
2018
Oceanian Championships

1st Individual pursuit
3rd Madison

National Championships

2nd Kilo
3rd Team pursuit

2019
Oceanian Championships

1st Individual pursuit
1st Team pursuit

2nd Madison, National Championships
3rd Team pursuit, UCI World Cup, Hong Kong
2020
National Championships

1st Individual pursuit
1st Omnium
3rd Points race

2021
1st Individual pursuit, National Championships
2022
Oceanian Championships

1st Madison
1st Team pursuit
2nd Individual pursuit

National Championships

1st Individual pursuit
1st Madison (with Josh Duffy)

1st Team pursuit, UCI Nations Cup, Milton
Commonwealth Games

3rd Individual pursuit
3rd Team pursuit

2023
Oceanian Championships

1st Team pursuit
3rd Omnium

National Championships

1st Individual pursuit
2nd Points race

2024
1st Team pursuit, Olympic Games
National Championships

1st Individual pursuit
1st Points race
1st Team pursuit

2nd Team pursuit, UCI Nations Cup, Adelaide
2nd Team pursuit, Oceanian Championships
2025
2nd Team pursuit, UCI World Championships
