= Oliver Bleddyn =

Australian cyclist (born 2002)

Oliver Bleddyn OAM
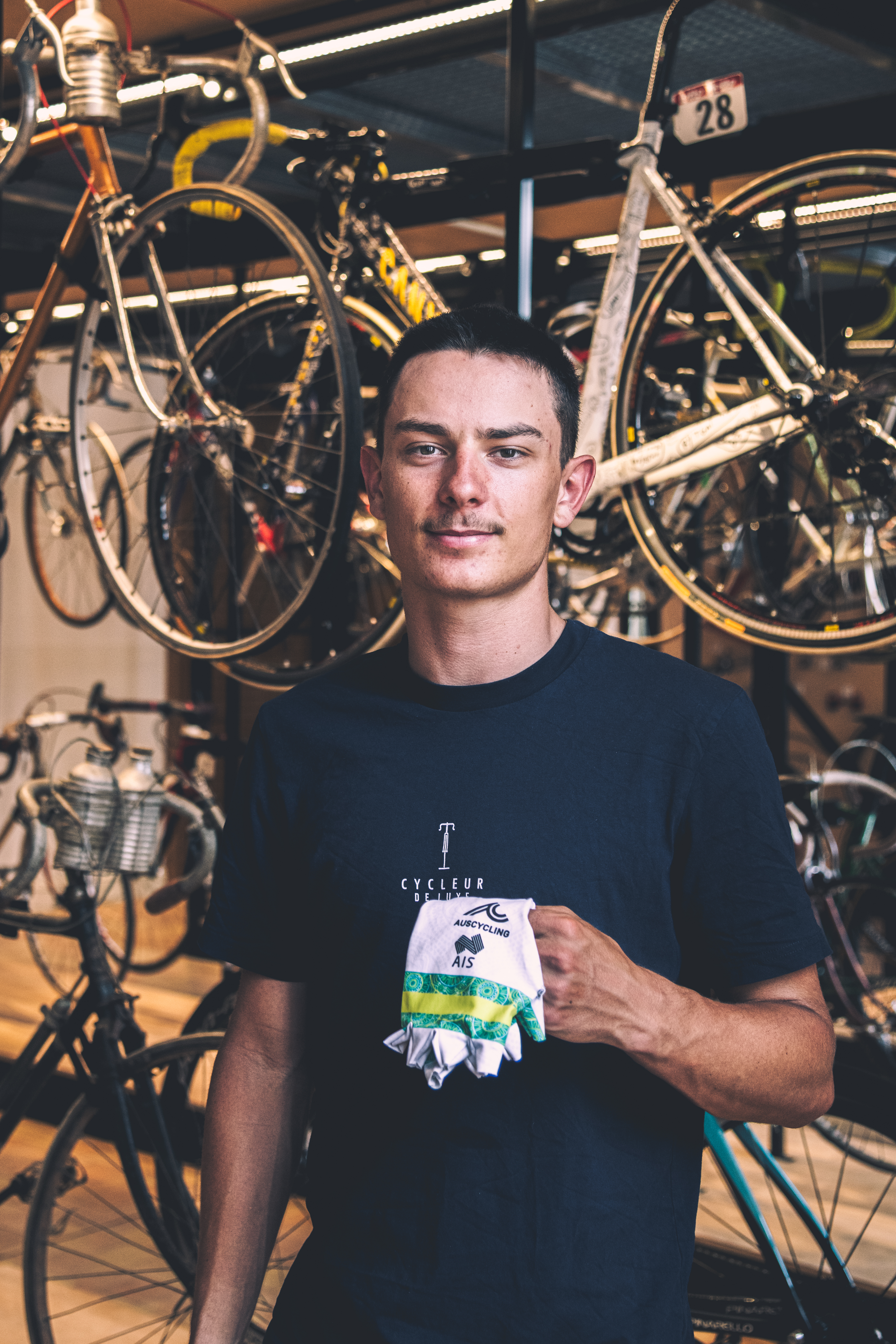
- Oliver Bleddyn poses in KOERS. Museum of Cycle Racing (Roeselare, Belgium)

Personal information
- Born: 27 January 2002 (age 24) Plymouth, UK
- Height: 1.80 m (5 ft 11 in)
- Weight: 69 kg (152 lb)

Cycling career
- Sport: Cycling
- Current team: ARA Skip Capital
- Disciplines: Track; Road
- Role: Rider

Professional teams
- 2023–2024: ARA Skip Capital
- 2025–: Team Jayco–AlUla

Major wins
- Track Olympic Games Team pursuit (2024)
Medal record
Men's track cycling
Representing Australia
Olympic Games
Gold medal – first place	2024 Paris	Team pursuit
World Championships
Silver medal – second place	2025 Santiago	Team pursuit
Commonwealth Games
Gold medal – first place	2026 Glasgow	Individual pursuit
Silver medal – second place	2026 Glasgow	Team pursuit

Oliver Bleddyn OAM (born 27 January 2002) is an Australian road and track cyclist, who currently rides for UCI Continental team ARA Skip Capital. He won the gold medal in the team pursuit at the 2024 Summer Olympics and the individual pursuit at the 2026 Commonwealth Games.

== Early life ==
He is from Western Australia and started bike racing at 12 years-old. He attended Frederick Irwin Anglican School and Applecross Senior High School. In 2018, he joined the Western Australian Institute of Sport. He won an Oceania U19 title in the team pursuit and won a silver in the individual pursuit. In 2021, he started training at the South Australia Institute for Sport.

== Career ==
He won gold with the team pursuit at the Oceania Track Cycling Championships in Brisbane in 2022. He finished third in the time trial at the Oceania Road Cycling Championships in 2023. He competed for Australia in the team pursuit and individual pursuit at the 2023 UCI Track Cycling World Championships in Glasgow, Scotland.

Bleddyn competed at the 2024 Paris Olympics in the team pursuit, winning the gold medal.

Bleddyn won a silver medal at the 2025 UCI Track Cycling World Championships in the men's team pursuit in Santiago, Chile.

In January 2026, he was runner-up to Jay Vine at the Australian National Time Trial Championships. Competing at the 2026 Commonwealth Games in Glasgow, Bleddyn set a Games-record time of 4:03.898 to win the gold medal in the 4000 metres individual pursuit. He also won the silver medal as part of the Australian side in the team pursuit.

== Major results ==
=== Track ===
2018
Oceanian Junior Championships

1st Madison
1st Team pursuit
2nd Individual pursuit

2019
1st Team pursuit, Oceanian Junior Championships
2021
2nd Scratch, National Championships
2022
1st Team pursuit, Oceanian Championships
National Championships

2nd Individual pursuit
2nd Madison
2nd Points race

2023
Oceanian Championships

1st Team pursuit
3rd Madison

National Championships

1st Team pursuit
2nd Individual pursuit

2024
1st Team pursuit, Olympic Games
2nd Team pursuit, Oceanian Championships
2025
2nd Team pursuit, UCI World Championships

=== Road ===
2022
7th Time trial, Oceania Under-23 Championships
2023
2nd Time trial, National Under-23 Championships
3rd Time trial, Oceania Under-23 Championships
2026
2nd Time trial, National Championships
