= James Moriarty (cyclist) =

Australian track cyclist (born 2001)

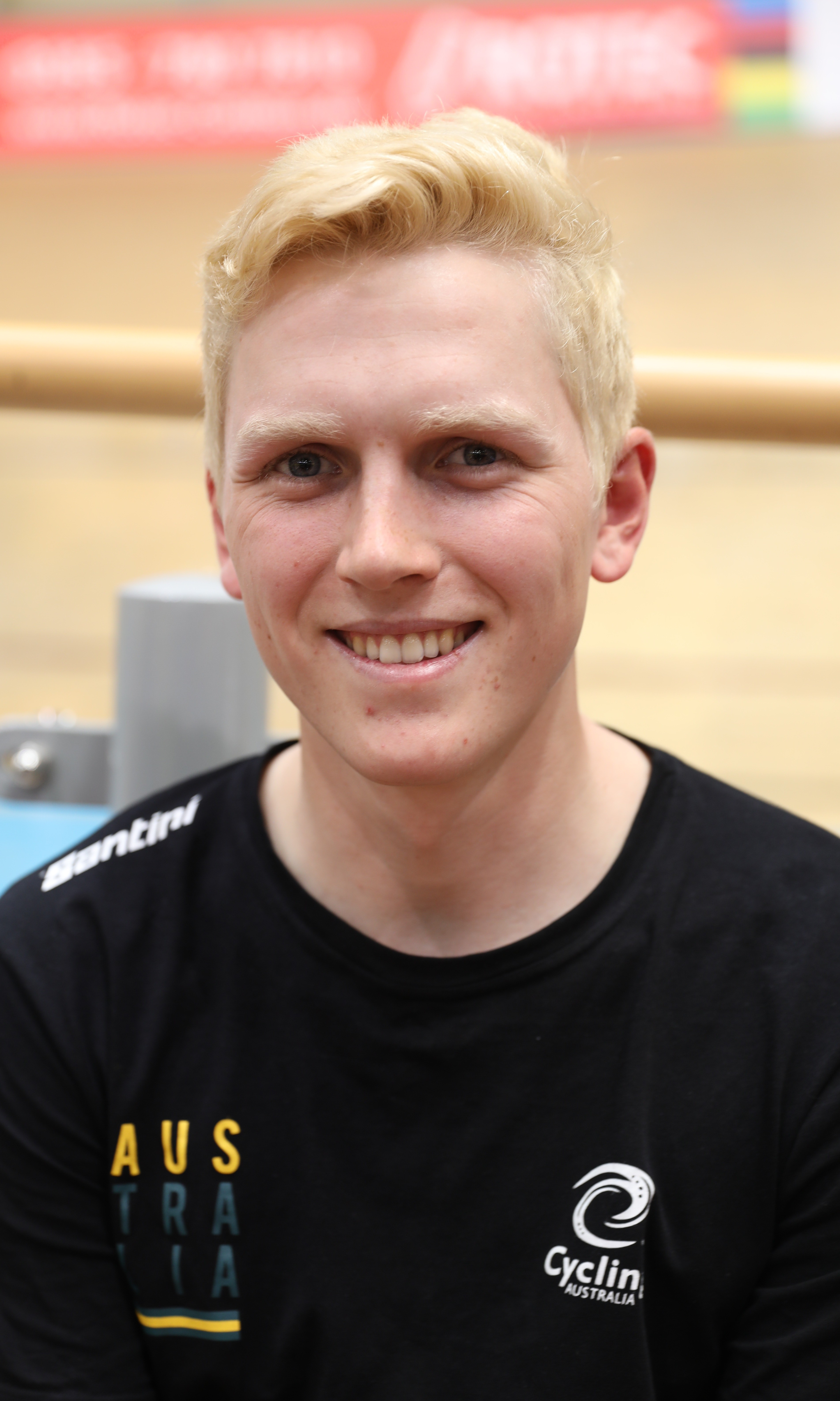
- Moriarty in 2019

Personal information
- Born: 7 June 2001 (age 25) South Brisbane, Australia

Cycling career
- Sport: Cycling
- Current team: CCACHE x BODYWRAP
- Disciplines: Track; Road
- Role: Rider

Amateur teams
- 2019–2020: Balmoral Cycle Club
- 2021–2022: InForm TM Insight MAKE
- 2022: Blackburn CC

Professional team
- 2023–: CCACHE x Par Küp
Medal record
Men's track cycling
Representing Australia
World Championships
Silver medal – second place	2025 Santiago	Team pursuit
Commonwealth Games
Bronze medal – third place	2022 Birmingham	Team pursuit

James Moriarty (born 7 June 2001) is an Australian road and track cyclist, who currently rides for UCI Continental team CCACHE x BODYWRAP. He won a bronze medal in the team pursuit at the 2022 Commonwealth Games.

== Major results ==
=== Track ===
2018
3rd Madison, National Championships (with Blake Quick)
2019
2nd Omnium, National Championships
2021
National Championships

2nd Individual pursuit
2nd Team pursuit

2022
1st Team pursuit, Oceanian Championships
2nd Team pursuit, National Championships
UCI Nations Cup, Milton

1st Team pursuit
3rd Individual pursuit

3rd Team pursuit, Commonwealth Games
2025
2nd Team pursuit, UCI World Championships

=== Road ===
2019
3rd Time trial, National Junior Championships
