= Samantha Donnelly =

New Zealand track cyclist (born 2003)

Sami Donnelly
- Donnelly in 2019

Personal information
- Full name: Samantha Donnelly
- Born: 13 December 2001 (age 24) Christchurch, New Zealand
- Height: 169 cm (5 ft 7 in)

Cycling career
- Sport: Cycling
- Discipline: Track cycling
- Role: Rider
Medal record
Women's track cycling
Representing New Zealand
Commonwealth Games
Silver medal – second place	2026 Glasgow	Team pursuit
Silver medal – second place	2026 Glasgow	Scratch race

Samantha Donnelly (born 13 December 2001) is a New Zealand track cyclist.

== Biography ==
From Christchurch, Donnelly is from a cycling family; her father Nigel Donnelly also represented New Zealand.

Donnelly was the 2017 New Zealand U19 road champion. On the track, she won silver medals as part of the New Zealand team pursuit at the 2018 and 2019 Junior Track World Championships. By 2023, Donnelly had won three medals at the Oceania Track championships. She was a reserve for the team at the 2024 Olympic Games.

In April 2026, she placed third overall in the omnium at the UCI Track World Cup in Malaysia. Competing at the 2026 Commonwealth Games she helped the New Zealand team pursuit into the final, where they won the silver medal. Later at the Games, she also won the silver medal in the women's 10 km scratch race final.
