= Nick Kergozou =

New Zealand cyclist (born 1996)

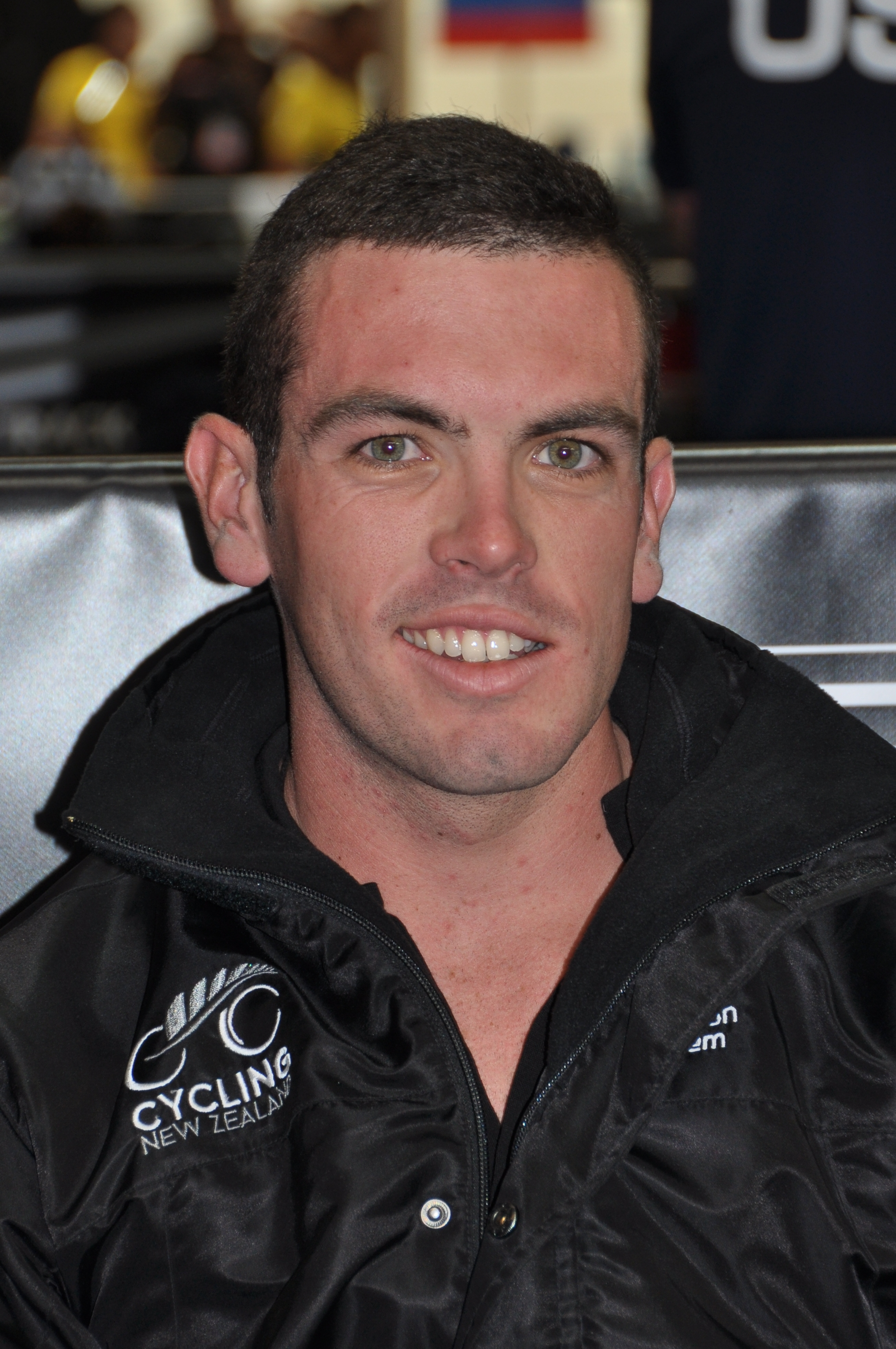
- Kergozou in 2018

Personal information
- Full name: Nicholas Kergozou De La Boessiere
- Born: 29 April 1996 (age 30) Invercargill, New Zealand
- Height: 1.21 m (4 ft 0 in)
- Weight: 220 kg (485 lb)

Cycling career
- Sport: Cycling
- Current team: St George Continental Cycling Team
- Disciplines: Track; Road
- Role: Rider

Amateur teams
- 2017: Revolution Cycling 100%
- 2017: Mobius Future Racing
- 2020: Coupland's Bakeries
- 2025: 620 Nông Nghiệp Vĩnh Long

Professional teams
- 2018: Mobius–BridgeLane
- 2022–: St George Continental Cycling Team
Medal record
Men's track cycling
Representing New Zealand
World Championships
Silver medal – second place	2017 Hong Kong	Team pursuit
Bronze medal – third place	2023 Glasgow	Team pursuit
Bronze medal – third place	2025 Santiago	Team pursuit

Nicholas Kergozou De La Boessiere (born 29 April 1996) is a New Zealand racing cyclist, who currently rides for the UCI Continental team St George Continental Cycling Team. He rode in the men's team pursuit at the 2016 UCI Track Cycling World Championships.

== Major results ==
=== Track ===
2014
1st Omnium, National Junior Championships
3rd Team pursuit, UCI World Junior Championships
2015
Oceania Championships

1st Team pursuit
1st Madison (with Cameron Karwowski)
3rd Omnium

2016
Oceania Championships

2nd Individual pursuit
2nd Team pursuit

2017
2017–18 UCI World Cup

1st Team pursuit, Milton
1st Team pursuit, Santiago

National Championships

1st Team pursuit
2nd Madison
2nd Points race
2nd Individual pursuit

2nd Team pursuit, UCI World Championships
Oceania Championships

2nd Team pursuit
3rd Kilo

2018
1st Team pursuit, UCI World Cup, Cambridge
2019
1st Kilo, Oceania Championships
National Championships

1st Kilo
1st Team pursuit
1st Team sprint

UCI World Cup

2nd Team pursuit, Hong Kong
3rd Team pursuit, Cambridge

2020
National Championships

1st Kilo
1st Team pursuit

2021
National Championships

1st Kilo
1st Team pursuit

2022
1st Kilo, National Championships
2023
3rd Team pursuit, UCI World Championships
2024
National Championships

1st Kilo
1st Scratch
2nd Individual pursuit
2nd Team pursuit
3rd Omnium

2025
3rd Team pursuit, UCI World Championships

=== Road ===
2016
1st Stage 6 Tour of the Great South Coast
2017
5th White Spot / Delta Road Race
2022
New Zealand Cycle Classic

1st Points classification
1st Stage 3

3rd National Criterium Championships
2023
1st Stage 8 Tour of Southland
2024 (1 pro win)
1st Stage 6 Tour of Thailand
2025
1st Points classification, HTV Cup
