= Tom Sexton (cyclist) =

New Zealand cyclist (born 1998)

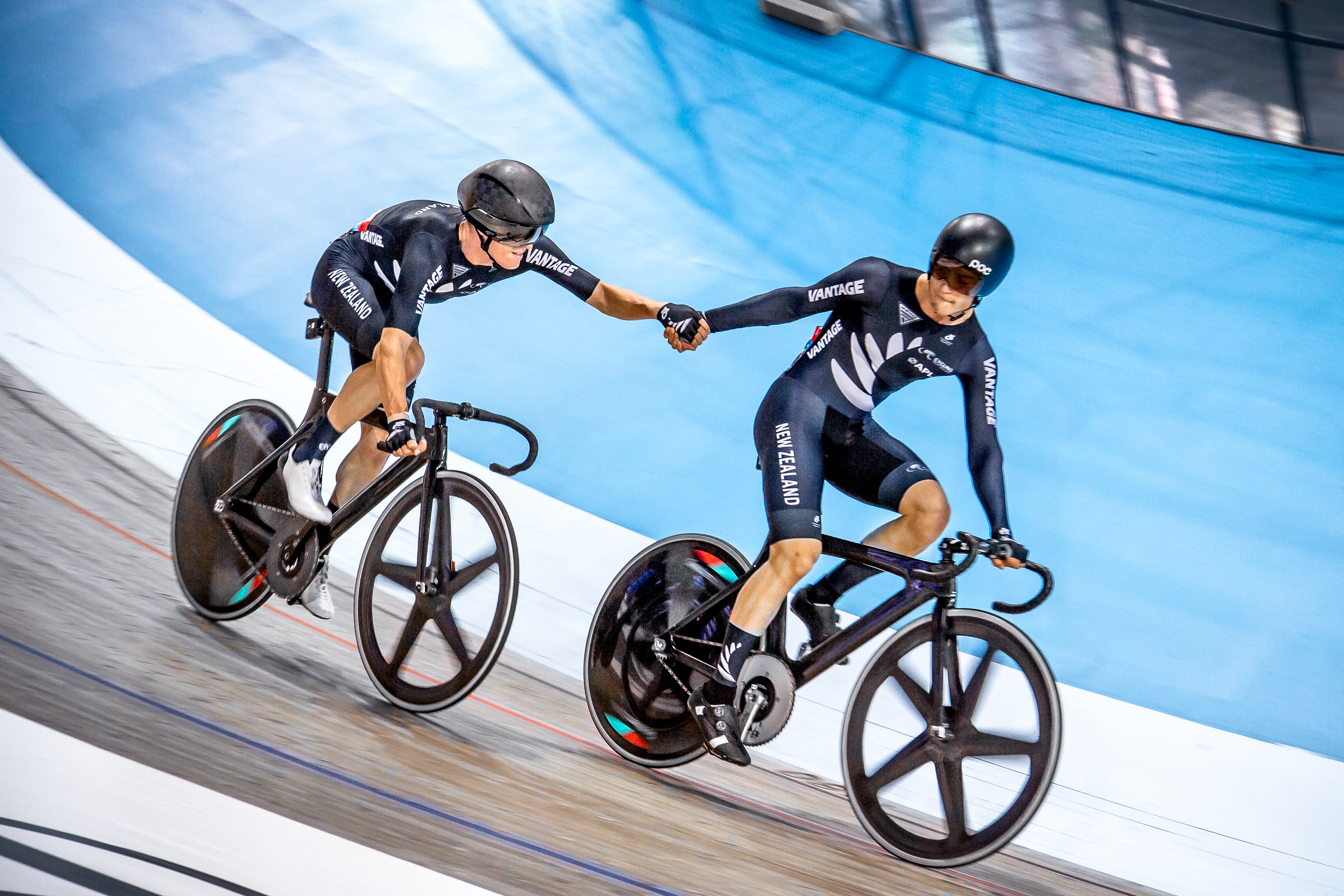
- Campbell Stewart and Sexton at the 2017 Track Cycling World Championships

Personal information
- Full name: Thomas Sexton
- Born: 19 November 1998 (age 27) Invercargill, New Zealand
- Height: 1.83 m (6 ft 0 in)
- Weight: 71 kg (157 lb)

Cycling career
- Sport: Cycling
- Current team: St George Continental Cycling Team
- Disciplines: Track; Road
- Role: Rider

Professional teams
- 2021–2023: Black Spoke Pro Cycling
- 2024–: St George Continental Cycling Team
Medal record
Men's track cycling
Representing New Zealand
World Championships
Silver medal – second place	2026 Shanghai	Scratch
Bronze medal – third place	2019 Pruszków	Scratch
Bronze medal – third place	2023 Glasgow	Team pursuit
Bronze medal – third place	2025 Santiago	Team pursuit
Commonwealth Games
Gold medal – first place	2022 Birmingham	Team pursuit
Silver medal – second place	2022 Birmingham	Individual pursuit
Bronze medal – third place	2026 Glasgow	Team pursuit
Junior World Championships
Gold medal – first place	2016 Aiglé	Team pursuit
Silver medal – second place	2016 Aiglé	Madison

Thomas Sexton (born 19 November 1998) is a New Zealand racing cyclist currently racing for UCI Continental team St George Continental Cycling Team. He rode in the men's scratch event at the 2018 UCI Track Cycling World Championships.

== Major results ==
=== Track ===
2015
3rd Madison, Oceania Championships
2016
UCI World Junior Championships

1st Team pursuit
2nd Madison

Oceania Championships

2nd Team pursuit
3rd Madison

UCI World Cup

3rd Scratch, Los Angeles
3rd Madison, Los Angeles (with Campbell Stewart)

2017
1st Madison, Oceania Championships (with Campbell Stewart)
National Championships

1st Team pursuit
2nd Madison

UCI World Cup

1st Team pursuit, Milton
1st Team pursuit, Santiago
1st Madison, Santiago (with Campbell Stewart)
2nd Madison, Milton (with Campbell Stewart)

2018
Oceania Championships

1st Team pursuit
2nd Madison

UCI World Cup

1st Team pursuit, Cambridge
1st Madison, Hong Kong (with Campbell Stewart)

2019
National Championships

1st Team pursuit
3rd Points race

UCI World Cup

2nd Team pursuit, Hong Kong
2nd Team pursuit, Brisbane
2nd Madison, Hong Kong (with Campbell Stewart)
2nd Madison, Brisbane (with Aaron Gate)

3rd Scratch, UCI World Championships
2020
1st Madison, National Championships (with Laurence Pithie)
2021
National Championships

1st Madison (with Regan Gough)
1st Team pursuit

2022
Commonwealth Games

1st Team pursuit
2nd Individual pursuit

National Championships

1st Madison (with Campbell Stewart)
1st Individual Pursuit

Oceania Championships

2nd Madison (with Aaron Gate)
2nd Points race
2nd Team pursuit

2023
3rd Team pursuit, UCI World Championships
2025
3rd Team pursuit, UCI World Championships
2026
2nd Scratch, UCI World Championships

=== Road ===
2020
1st Prologue (TTT) Tour of Southland
2021
1st Prologue (TTT) Tour of Southland
2022
1st Prologue Turul Romaniei
Oceania Championships

2nd Time trial
3rd Road race

National Championships

2nd Road race
3rd Time trial

9th Time trial, Commonwealth Games
2023
Oceania Championships

1st Time trial
3rd Road race

National Championships

4th Time trial
5th Road race

9th Overall Tour Poitou-Charentes en Nouvelle-Aquitaine
