= 2021 UEC European Track Championships (under-23 & junior) =

- Venue: Apeldoorn
- Date: 17–22 August
- Velodrome: Omnisport Apeldoorn
- Nations participating: 27
- Cyclists participating: 399
- Events: 44

The 2021 UEC European Track Championships (under-23 & junior) were the 21st continental championships for European under-23 and junior track cyclists, and the 12th since the event was renamed following the reorganisation of European track cycling in 2010. The event took place at the Omnisport Apeldoorn in Apeldoorn, Netherlands from 17 to 22 August 2021.

== Medal summary ==
=== Under-23 ===
Event	Gold		Silver		Bronze	
Men's events
Sprint	Mikhail Iakovlev; Russia		Tom Derache; France		Anton Höhne; Germany	
Team sprint	Great Britain; Alistair Fielding; Hamish Turnbull; Hayden Norris; James Bunting	43.962	Germany; Paul Schippert; Julien Jäger; Anton Höhne	44.522	Russia; Daniil Komkov; Dmitry Nesterov; Pavel Rostov; Ivan Gladyshev	44.256
1 km time trial	Daan Kool; Netherlands	1:01.569	Hayden Norris; Great Britain	1:01.714	Anton Höhne; Germany	1:01.811
Keirin	Mikhail Iakovlev; Russia		Daniel Rochna; Poland		Tom Derache; France	
Individual pursuit	Tobias Buck-Gramcko; Germany	4:19.318	Nicolas Heinrich; Germany	4:27.078	Manlio Moro; Italy	4:18.945
Team pursuit	Russia; Egor Igoshev; Ilia Shchegolkov; Ivan Novolodskii; Vlas Shichkin	3:54.603	Great Britain; Alfred George; Max Rushby; Rhys Britton; William Tidball	4:00.534	Italy; Davide Boscaro; Gidas Umbri; Tommaso Nencini; Manlio Moro; Niccolò Galli	
Points race	Vlas Shichkin; Russia	79 pts	Diogo Narciso; Portugal	55 pts	Mattia Pinazzi; Italy	49 pts
Scratch	Rodrigo Caixas; Portugal		Tuur Dens; Belgium		Daniel Babor; Czech Republic	
Madison	Great Britain; Rhys Britton; William Tidball	52 pts	Russia; Ilia Shchegolkov; Vlas Shichkin	46 pts	Netherlands; Philip Heijnen; Vincent Hoppezak	42 pts
Omnium	Matias Malmberg; Denmark	123 pts	Fabio Van den Bossche; Belgium	119 pts	Daniel Babor; Czech Republic	115 pts
Elimination race	Maikel Zijlaard; Netherlands		Tim Torn Teutenberg; Germany		William Tidball; Great Britain	
Women's events
Sprint	Yana Tyshchenko; Russia		Ksenia Andreeva; Russia		Alessa-Catriona Pröpster; Germany	
Team sprint	Russia; Ksenia Andreeva; Serafima Grishina; Yana Tyshchenko	48.313	Great Britain; Lauren Bell; Blaine Ridge-Davis; Emma Finucane	48.590	Poland; Nikola Seremak; Nikola Sibiak; Paulina Petri	49.251
500 m time trial	Yana Tyshchenko; Russia	33.890	Steffie van der Peet; Netherlands	34.271	Alessa-Catriona Pröpster; Germany	34.580
Keirin	Ksenia Andreeva; Russia		Yana Tyshchenko; Russia		Alessa-Catriona Pröpster; Germany	
Individual pursuit	Silvia Zanardi; Italy	3:33.359	Lara Gillespie; Ireland	3:36.804	Abi Smith; Great Britain	3:37.490
Team pursuit	Italy; Chiara Consonni; Eleonora Camilla Gasparrini; Martina Fidanza; Silvia Zanardi		Great Britain; Abi Smith; Ella Barnwell; Eluned King; Sophie Lewis	OVL	Netherlands; Amber van der Hulst; Lonneke Uneken; Marit Raaijmakers; Mylène de Zoete	4:30.284
Points race	Silvia Zanardi; Italy	38 pts	Shari Bossuyt; Belgium	27 pts	Viktoriia Yaroshenko; Ukraine	26 pts
Scratch	Maike van der Duin; Netherlands		Maria Martins; Portugal		Martina Fidanza; Italy	
Madison	Italy; Chiara Consonni; Martina Fidanza	46 pts	Netherlands; Maike van der Duin; Marit Raaijmakers	28 pts	Russia; Daria Malkova; Maria Rostovtseva	22 pts
Omnium	Maria Martins; Portugal	126 pts	Maike van der Duin; Netherlands	122 pts	Lea Lin Teutenberg; Germany	121 pts
Elimination race	Chiara Consonni; Italy		Maria Martins; Portugal		Maike van der Duin; Netherlands	

=== Junior ===
Event	Gold		Silver		Bronze	
Men's events
Sprint	Nikita Kalachnik; Russia		Willy Weinrich; Germany		Harry Ledingham-Horn; Great Britain	
Team sprint	Great Britain; Ed Lowe; Marcus Hiley; Harry Ledingham-Horn	44.737	Germany; Luca Spiegel; Willy Weinrich; Paul Groß; Max Briese	45.382	Russia; Grigorii Skorniakov; Nikita Kalachnik; David Shekelashvili	45.497
1 km time trial	Willy Weinrich; Germany	1:02.221	Harry Ledingham-Horn; Great Britain	1:02.825	Tom Sharples; Great Britain	1:03.528
Keirin	Nikita Kalachnik; Russia		David Shekelashvili; Russia		Paul Groß; Germany	
Individual pursuit	Samuele Bonetto; Italy		Benjamin Boos; Germany	OVL	Josh Charlton; Great Britain	3:15.057
Team pursuit	Great Britain; Josh Charlton; Joshua Giddings; Joshua Tarling; Ross Birrell	3:59.392	France; Alexandre Boxe; Eddy Le Huitouze; Emmanuel Houcou; Grégory Pouvreault	4:04.400	Russia; Daniil Zarakovskiy; Mark Kryuchkov; Mikhail Postarnak; Grigorii Skorniakov; Savelii Laptev	4:01.815
Points race	Milan Kadlec; Czech Republic	74 pts	Grégory Pouvreault; France	68 pts	Mikhail Postarnak; Russia	67 pts
Scratch	Phillip Mathiesen; Denmark		Lorenzo Ursella; Italy		Jakub Lewandowski; Poland	
Madison	Great Britain; Josh Charlton; Joshua Giddings	52 pts	Germany; Malte Maschke; Nicolas Zippan	44 pts	Czech Republic; Matyáš Koblížek; Milan Kadlec	40 pts
Omnium	Joshua Tarling; Great Britain	154 pts	Dario Igor Belletta; Italy	149 pts	Eddy Le Huitouze; France	117 pts
Elimination race	Matyáš Koblížek; Czech Republic		Dmitrii Dolzhikov; Russia		Dominik Ratajczak; Poland	
Women's events
Sprint	Alina Lysenko; Russia		Rhian Edmunds; Great Britain		Iona Moir; Great Britain	
Team sprint	Russia; Elizaveta Bogomolova; Elizaveta Krechkina; Alina Lysenko; Varvara Blagodarova	49.517	Great Britain; Jade Hopkins; Iona Moir; Rhian Edmunds	49.708	Germany; Lara-Sophie Jäger; Clara Schneider; Stella Müller	51.235
500 m time trial	Alina Lysenko; Russia	34.227	Iona Moir; Great Britain	34.769	Rhian Edmunds; Great Britain	34.811
Keirin	Alina Lysenko; Russia		Alla Biletska; Ukraine		Rhian Edmunds; Great Britain	
Individual pursuit	Zoe Bäckstedt; Great Britain	2:18.675	Alena Ivanchenko; Russia	2:22.531	Marith Vanhove; Belgium	2:23.982
Team pursuit	Great Britain; Grace Lister; Madelaine Leech; Millie Couzens; Zoe Bäckstedt	4:21.417; WJR	Russia; Alena Ivanchenko; Alina Moiseeva; Inna Abaidullina; Valeria Valgonen	4:25.191	Germany; Fabienne Jährig; Franzi Arendt; Justyna Czapla; Lana Eberle	4:30.666
Points race	Alena Ivanchenko; Russia	76 pts	Madelaine Leech; Great Britain	34 pts	Fabienne Jährig; Germany	33 pts
Scratch	Valentina Basilico; Italy		Marith Vanhove; Belgium		Maja Tracka; Poland	
Madison	Great Britain; Millie Couzens; Zoe Bäckstedt	68 pts	Germany; Jette Simon; Lana Eberle	27 pts	Netherlands; Nienke Veenhoven; Yuli van der Molen	19 pts
Omnium	Millie Couzens; Great Britain	127 pts	Inna Abaidullina; Russia	123 pts	Olga Wankiewicz; Poland	115 pts
Elimination race	Alina Moiseeva; Russia		Sara Fiorin; Italy		Lana Eberle; Germany	

Notes

- Competitors named in italics only participated in rounds prior to the final.

== Medal table ==
* Host nation (Netherlands)

Rank	Nation	Gold	Silver	Bronze	Total
1	Russia	16	8	5	29
2	Great Britain	10	9	8	27
3	Italy	7	3	4	14
4	Netherlands*	3	3	4	10
5	Germany	2	8	11	21
6	Portugal	2	3	0	5
7	Czech Republic	2	0	3	5
8	Denmark	2	0	0	2
9	Belgium	0	4	1	5
10	France	0	3	2	5
11	Poland	0	1	5	6
12	Ukraine	0	1	1	2
13	Ireland	0	1	0	1
Totals (13 entries)		44	44	44	132
