= 2026 UEC European Track Championships – Women's keirin =

Women's keirin at the 2026 UEC Track Elite European Championships
- Venue: Konya Velodrome, Konya
- Date: 5 February
- Competitors: 22

Medalists
gold medal	Alina Lysenko
silver medal	Mathilde Gros	France
bronze medal	Lea Friedrich	Germany

The women's keirin competition at the 2026 UEC European Track Championships was held on 5 February 2026.

== Results ==
=== First round ===
The first two riders in each heat qualified for the semifinals, and all other riders advanced to the first round repechages.

Heat 1

Rank	Name	Nation	Gap	Notes
1	Lea Friedrich	Germany		Q
2	Steffie van der Peet	Netherlands	+0.073	Q
3	Anna Jaborníková	Czech Republic	+0.198	
4	Alla Biletska	Ukraine	+0.347	
5	Varvara Basiakova	Individual Neutral Athletes	+1.614	

Heat 3

Rank	Name	Nation	Gap	Notes
1	Yana Burlakova	Individual Neutral Athletes		Q
2	Helena Casas	Spain		Q
3	Lauren Bell	Great Britain		
4	Matilde Cenci	Italy		
5	Zita Gheysens	Belgium		
6	Nikola Sibiak	Poland		

Heat 2

Rank	Name	Nation	Gap	Notes
1	Alina Lysenko	Individual Neutral Athletes		Q
2	Mathilde Gros	France		Q
3	Clara Schneider	Germany		
4	Nikola Seremak	Poland		
5	Oleksandra Lohviniuk	Ukraine		

Heat 4

Rank	Name	Nation	Gap	Notes
1	Miriam Vece	Italy		Q
2	Kimberly Kalee	Netherlands	+0.067	Q
3	Lowri Thomas	Great Britain	+0.114	
4	Veronika Jaborníková	Czech Republic	+0.427	
5	Nicky Degrendele	Belgium	+0.427	
6	Lauryna Valiukevičiūtė	Lithuania	+0.892	

=== Repechage ===
The first rider in each heat qualified for the semifinals.

Heat 1

Rank	Name	Nation	Gap	Notes
1	Veronika Jaborníková	Czech Republic		Q
1	Clara Schneider	Germany		Q
3	Zita Gheysens	Belgium	+1.179	

Heat 3

Rank	Name	Nation	Gap	Notes
1	Lauren Bell	Great Britain		Q
2	Nikola Seremak	Poland	+0.322	
3	Lauryna Valiukevičiūtė	Lithuania	+0.773	
4	Varvara Basiakova	Individual Neutral Athletes	+1.041	

Heat 2

Rank	Name	Nation	Gap	Notes
1	Matilde Cenci	Italy		Q
2	Anna Jaborníková	Czech Republic	+0.023	
3	Oleksandra Lohviniuk	Ukraine	+0.111	

Heat 4

Rank	Name	Nation	Gap	Notes
1	Lowri Thomas	Great Britain		Q
2	Alla Biletska	Ukraine	+0.312	
3	Nikola Sibiak	Poland	+0.521	
4	Nicky Degrendele	Belgium	+0.767	

=== Semifinals ===
The first three riders in each heat qualified for the final, all other riders raced for places 7 to 13.

Heat 1

Rank	Name	Nation	Gap	Notes
1	Alina Lysenko	Individual Neutral Athletes		Q
2	Steffie van der Peet	Netherlands	+0.063	Q
3	Helena Casas	Spain	+0.147	Q
4	Miriam Vece	Italy	+0.186	
5	Clara Schneider	Germany	+0.258	
6	Veronika Jaborníková	Czech Republic	+0.364	
7	Lowri Thomas	Great Britain	+2.265	

Heat 2

Rank	Name	Nation	Gap	Notes
1	Lea Friedrich	Germany		Q
2	Lauren Bell	Great Britain	+0.078	Q
3	Mathilde Gros	France	+0.080	Q
4	Yana Burlakova	Individual Neutral Athletes	+0.123	
5	Kimberly Kalee	Netherlands	+0.292	
6	Matilde Cenci	Italy	+0.431	

=== Finals ===
Small final

Rank	Name	Nation	Gap	Notes
7	Yana Burlakova	Individual Neutral Athletes		
8	Miriam Vece	Italy	+0.664	
9	Lowri Thomas	Great Britain	+0.664	
10	Veronika Jaborníková	Czech Republic	+0.859	
11	Clara Schneider	Germany	+0.903	
12	Kimberly Kalee	Netherlands	+1.007	
13	Matilde Cenci	Italy	+1.418	

Final

Rank	Name	Nation	Gap	Notes
1st place, gold medalist(s)	Alina Lysenko	Individual Neutral Athletes		
2nd place, silver medalist(s)	Mathilde Gros	France	+0.212	
3rd place, bronze medalist(s)	Lea Friedrich	Germany	+0.234	
4	Lauren Bell	Great Britain	+0.450	
5	Helena Casas	Spain	+0.674	
6	Steffie van der Peet	Netherlands	+0.729	
