= 2025 UCI Track Cycling World Championships – Women's sprint =

Women's sprint at the 2025 UCI Track Cycling World Championships
- Venue: Velódromo Peñalolén
- Location: Santiago, Chile
- Dates: 23–24 October
- Competitors: 34 from 21 nations

Medalists
gold medal	Hetty van de Wouw	Netherlands
silver medal	Mina Sato	Japan
bronze medal	Alina Lysenko	Individual Neutral Athletes

The Women's sprint competition at the 2025 UCI Track Cycling World Championships was held on 23 and 24 October 2025.

== Results ==
=== Qualifying ===
The qualifying was started on 23 October at 11:27.

Rank	Name	Nation	Time	Behind	Notes
1	Lea Friedrich	Germany	10.331		Q
2	Hetty van de Wouw	Netherlands	10.339	+0.008	Q
3	Emma Finucane	Great Britain	10.341	+0.010	Q
4	Lauriane Genest	Canada	10.351	+0.020	Q
5	Mina Sato	Japan	10.398	+0.067	Q
6	Yana Burlakova	Individual Neutral Athletes	10.423	+0.092	Q
7	Ellesse Andrews	New Zealand	10.432	+0.101	Q
8	Alina Lysenko	Individual Neutral Athletes	10.453	+0.122	Q
9	Stefany Cuadrado	Colombia	10.471	+0.140	Q
10	Pauline Grabosch	Germany	10.500	+0.169	Q
11	Miriam Vece	Italy	10.507	+0.176	Q
12	Iona Moir	Great Britain	10.559	+0.228	Q
13	Mathilde Gros	France	10.569	+0.238	Q
14	Lauren Bell	Great Britain	10.582	+0.251	Q
15	Steffie van der Peet	Netherlands	10.644	+0.313	Q
16	Ekaterina Evlanova	Individual Neutral Athletes	10.739	+0.408	Q
17	Sarah Orban	Canada	10.749	+0.418	Q
18	Veronika Jaborníková	Czech Republic	10.775	+0.444	Q
19	Kayla Hankins	United States	10.812	+0.481	Q
20	Yuli Verdugo	Mexico	10.820	+0.489	Q
21	Alla Biletska	Ukraine	10.828	+0.497	Q
22	Alessia McCaig	Australia	10.832	+0.501	Q
23	Emily Hayes	United States	10.852	+0.521	Q
24	Haruka Nakazawa	Japan	10.857	+0.526	Q
25	Aki Sakai	Japan	10.945	+0.614	Q
26	Nurul Izzah Izzati Mohd Asri	Malaysia	11.019	+0.688	Q
27	Nikola Seremak	Poland	11.037	+0.706	Q
28	Makaira Wallace	Trinidad and Tobago	11.060	+0.729	Q
29	Molly McGill	Australia	11.085	+0.754	
30	Helena Casas	Spain	11.197	+0.866	
31	Juliana Gaviria	Colombia	11.204	+0.873	
32	Urszula Łoś	Poland	11.324	+0.993	
33	Paula Molina	Chile	11.363	+1.032	
34	Shahd Mohamed	Egypt	12.157	+1.826	

=== 1/16 finals ===
The 1/16 finals was started on 23 October at 12:42.

Heat	Rank	Name	Nation	Gap	Notes
1	1	Mina Sato	Japan		Q
1	2	Makaira Wallace	Trinidad and Tobago	+0.165	
2	1	Yana Burlakova	Individual Neutral Athletes		Q
2	2	Nikola Seremak	Poland	+0.476	
3	1	Ellesse Andrews	New Zealand		Q
3	2	Nurul Izzah Izzati Mohd Asri	Malaysia	+0.110	
4	1	Alina Lysenko	Individual Neutral Athletes		Q
4	2	Aki Sakai	Japan	+0.291	
5	1	Stefany Cuadrado	Colombia		Q
5	2	Haruka Nakazawa	Japan	+0.114	
6	1	Pauline Grabosch	Germany		Q
6	2	Emily Hayes	United States	+0.151	
7	1	Miriam Vece	Italy		Q
7	2	Alessia McCaig	Australia	+0.013	
8	1	Alla Biletska	Ukraine		Q
8	2	Iona Moir	Great Britain	+0.023	
9	1	Mathilde Gros	France		Q
9	2	Yuli Verdugo	Mexico	+0.054	
10	1	Lauren Bell	Great Britain		Q
10	2	Kayla Hankins	United States	+0.301	
11	1	Veronika Jaborníková	Czech Republic		Q
11	2	Steffie van der Peet	Netherlands	+0.004	
12	1	Ekaterina Evlanova	Individual Neutral Athletes		Q
12	2	Sarah Orban	Canada	+0.247	

=== 1/8 finals ===
The 1/8 finals was started on 23 October at 13:34.

Heat	Rank	Name	Nation	Gap	Notes
1	1	Lea Friedrich	Germany		Q
1	2	Ekaterina Evlanova	Individual Neutral Athletes	+0.145	
2	1	Hetty van de Wouw	Netherlands		Q
2	2	Veronika Jaborníková	Czech Republic	+0.143	
3	1	Emma Finucane	Great Britain		Q
3	2	Lauren Bell	Great Britain	+0.116	
4	1	Lauriane Genest	Canada		Q
4	2	Mathilde Gros	France	+0.025	
5	1	Mina Sato	Japan		Q
5	2	Alla Biletska	Ukraine	+0.132	
6	1	Yana Burlakova	Individual Neutral Athletes		Q
6	2	Miriam Vece	Italy	+0.080	
7	1	Ellesse Andrews	New Zealand		Q
7	2	Pauline Grabosch	Germany	+0.054	
8	1	Alina Lysenko	Individual Neutral Athletes		Q
8	2	Stefany Cuadrado	Colombia	+0.182	

=== Quarterfinals ===
The quarterfinals were started on 23 October at 17:58.

Heat	Rank	Name	Nation	Race 1	Race 2	Decider (i.r.)	Notes
1	1	Alina Lysenko	Individual Neutral Athletes	X	X		Q
1	2	Lea Friedrich	Germany	+0.014	+0.035		
2	1	Hetty van de Wouw	Netherlands	X	X		Q
2	2	Ellesse Andrews	New Zealand	+0.190	+0.183		
3	1	Yana Burlakova	Individual Neutral Athletes	+0.040	X	X	Q
3	2	Emma Finucane	Great Britain	X	+0.115	REL	
4	1	Mina Sato	Japan	X	+0.034	X	Q
4	2	Lauriane Genest	Canada	+0.092	X	+0.030	

=== Semifinals ===
The semifinals were started on 24 October at 17:52.

Heat	Rank	Name	Nation	Race 1	Race 2	Decider (i.r.)	Notes
1	1	Mina Sato	Japan	X	X		Q
1	2	Alina Lysenko	Individual Neutral Athletes	+0.084	+0.076		
2	1	Hetty van de Wouw	Netherlands	X	X		Q
2	2	Yana Burlakova	Individual Neutral Athletes	+0.168	+1.086		

=== Finals ===
The finals were started on 24 October at 19:25.

Rank	Name	Nation	Race 1	Race 2	Decider (i.r.)
Gold medal race
1st place, gold medalist(s)	Hetty van de Wouw	Netherlands	X	X	
2nd place, silver medalist(s)	Mina Sato	Japan	+0.025	+0.026	
Bronze medal race
3rd place, bronze medalist(s)	Alina Lysenko	Individual Neutral Athletes	X	REL	X
4	Yana Burlakova	Individual Neutral Athletes	+0.007	X	+0.153
