= 2025 UEC European Track Championships – Women's keirin =

Cycling competition

Men's keirin at the 2025 UEC European Track Championships
- Venue: Velodroom Limburg, Heusden-Zolder
- Date: 16 February
- Competitors: 20 from 13 nations

Medalists
gold medal	Steffie van der Peet	Netherlands
silver medal	Rhian Edmunds	Great Britain
bronze medal	Hetty van de Wouw	Netherlands

The women's keirin competition at the 2025 UEC European Track Championships was held on 16 February 2025.

== Results ==
=== First round ===
The first rider in each heat qualified for the second round, and all other riders advanced to the first round repechages.

Heat 1

Rank	Name	Nation	Notes
1	Rhian Edmunds	United Kingdom	Q
2	Lea Sophie Friedrich	Germany	
3	Veronika Jaborníková	Czech Republic	
4	Marie-Louisa Drouode	France	
5	Marija Pavlović	Serbia	

Heat 2

Rank	Name	Nation	Notes
1	Hetty van de Wouw	Netherlands	Q
2	Yana Burlakova	Individual Neutral Athletes	
3	Nikola Seremak	Poland	
4	Clara Schneider	Germany	
5	Helena Casas	Spain	

Heat 3

Rank	Name	Nation	Notes
1	Alina Lysenko	Individual Neutral Athletes	Q
2	Steffie van der Peet	Netherlands	
3	Oleksandra Lohviniuk	Ukraine	
4	Sára Peterková	Czech Republic	
5	Beatrice Bertolini	Italy	

Heat 4

Rank	Name	Nation	Notes
1	Lauren Bell	United Kingdom	Q
2	Miriam Vece	Italy	
3	Alla Biletska	Ukraine	
4	Marlena Karwacka	Poland	
5	Lauryna Valiukevičiūtė	Lithuania	

=== Repechage ===
The first two riders in each heat qualify to the second round.

Heat 1

Rank	Name	Nation	Notes
1	Lea Sophie Friedrich	Germany	Q
2	Helena Casas	Spain	Q
3	Alla Biletska	Ukraine	
4	Sára Peterková	Czech Republic	

Heat 2

Rank	Name	Nation	Notes
1	Veronika Jaborníková	Czech Republic	Q
2	Yana Burlakova	Individual Neutral Athletes	Q
3	Marlena Karwacka	Poland	
4	Beatrice Bertolini	Italy	

Heat 3

Rank	Name	Nation	Notes
1	Steffie van der Peet	Netherlands	Q
2	Nikola Seremak	Poland	Q
3	Lauryna Valiukevičiūtė	Lithuania	
4	Marie-Louisa Drouode	France	

Heat 4

Rank	Name	Nation	Notes
1	Miriam Vece	Italy	Q
2	Clara Schneider	Germany	Q
3	Oleksandra Lohviniuk	Ukraine	
4	Marija Pavlović	Serbia	

=== Second round ===
The first three riders in each heat qualify to final 1–6, all other riders advance to final 7–12.

Heat 1

Rank	Name	Nation	Notes
1	Miriam Vece	Italy	Q
2	Rhian Edmunds	United Kingdom	Q
3	Hetty van de Wouw	Netherlands	Q
4	Nikola Seremak	Poland	
5	Yana Burlakova	Individual Neutral Athletes	
6	Lea Sophie Friedrich	Germany	

Heat 2

Rank	Name	Nation	Notes
1	Alina Lysenko	Individual Neutral Athletes	Q
2	Lauren Bell	United Kingdom	Q
3	Steffie van der Peet	Netherlands	Q
4	Helena Casas	Spain	
5	Clara Schneider	Germany	
6	Veronika Jaborníková	Czech Republic	

=== Final ===
Small final

Rank	Name	Nation	Notes
7	Lea Sophie Friedrich	Germany	
8	Yana Burlakova	Individual Neutral Athletes	
9	Clara Schneider	Germany	
10	Nikola Seremak	Poland	
11	Helena Casas	Spain	
12	Veronika Jaborníková	Czech Republic	

Final

Rank	Name	Nation	Notes
1st place, gold medalist(s)	Steffie van der Peet	Netherlands	
2nd place, silver medalist(s)	Rhian Edmunds	United Kingdom	
3rd place, bronze medalist(s)	Hetty van de Wouw	Netherlands	
4	Alina Lysenko	Individual Neutral Athletes	
5	Miriam Vece	Italy	
6	Lauren Bell	United Kingdom	
