= 2025 UEC European Track Championships – Women's sprint =

Women's sprint at the 2025 UEC European Track Championships
- Venue: Velodroom Limburg, Heusden-Zolder
- Date: 13–14 February
- Competitors: 21 from 12 nations

Medalists
gold medal	Yana Burlakova
silver medal	Rhian Edmunds	Great Britain
bronze medal	Alina Lysenko

The women's sprint competition at the 2025 UEC European Track Championships was held on 13 and 14 February 2025.

== Results ==
=== Qualifying ===
The top 11 riders qualified for the 1/8 finals, 12th to 21st places qualified for the 1/16 finals.

Rank	Name	Nation	Time	Behind	Notes
1	Lauren Bell	Great Britain	10.487		Q
2	Hetty van de Wouw	Netherlands	10.511	+0.024	Q
3	Rhian Edmunds	Great Britain	10.580	+0.093	Q
4	Lea Friedrich	Germany	10.647	+0.160	Q
5	Alina Lysenko	Individual Neutral Athletes	10.708	+0.221	Q
6	Veronika Jaborníková	Czech Republic	10.734	+0.247	Q
7	Miriam Vece	Italy	10.736	+0.249	Q
8	Steffie van der Peet	Netherlands	10.751	+0.264	Q
9	Yana Burlakova	Individual Neutral Athletes	10.852	+0.365	Q
10	Clara Schneider	Germany	10.903	+0.416	Q
11	Oleksandra Lohviniuk	Ukraine	10.947	+0.460	Q
12	Marie-Louisa Drouode	France	11.048	+0.561	q
13	Alla Biletska	Ukraine	11.056	+0.569	q
14	Nikola Seremak	Poland	11.142	+0.655	q
15	Paulina Petri	Poland	11.186	+0.699	q
16	Anna Jaborníková	Czech Republic	11.269	+0.782	q
17	Lauryna Valiukevičiūtė	Lithuania	11.371	+0.884	q
18	Helena Casas	Spain	11.428	+0.941	q
19	Miglė Lendel	Lithuania	11.776	+1.289	q
20	Matilde Cenci	Italy	11.904	+1.417	q
21	Marija Pavlović	Serbia	13.382	+2.895	q

=== 1/16 finals ===
Heat winners advanced to the 1/8 finals.

Heat	Rank	Name	Nation	Time	Notes
1	1	Marie-Louisa Drouode	France	X	Q
1	2	Marija Pavlović	Serbia	+1.867	
2	1	Alla Biletska	Ukraine	X	Q
2	2	Matilde Cenci	Italy	+0.156	
3	1	Nikola Seremak	Poland	X	Q
3	2	Miglė Lendel	Lithuania	+0.633	
4	1	Paulina Petri	Poland	X	Q
4	2	Helena Casas	Spain	+0.131	
5	1	Anna Jaborníková	Czech Republic	X	Q
5	2	Lauryna Valiukevičiūtė	Lithuania	+0.142	

=== 1/8 finals ===
Heat winners advanced to the quarterfinals.

Heat	Rank	Name	Nation	Time	Notes
1	1	Lauren Bell	Great Britain	X	Q
1	2	Anna Jaborníková	Czech Republic	+0.277	
2	1	Hetty van de Wouw	Netherlands	X	Q
2	2	Paulina Petri	Poland	+0.462	
3	1	Rhian Edmunds	Great Britain	X	Q
3	2	Nikola Seremak	Poland	+0.206	
4	1	Lea Friedrich	Germany	X	Q
4	2	Alla Biletska	Ukraine	+0.099	
5	1	Alina Lysenko	Individual Neutral Athletes	X	Q
5	2	Marie-Louisa Drouode	France	+0.057	
6	1	Veronika Jaborníková	Czech Republic	X	Q
6	2	Oleksandra Lohviniuk	Ukraine	+0.260	
7	1	Miriam Vece	Italy	X	Q
7	2	Clara Schneider	Germany	+0.065	
8	1	Yana Burlakova	Individual Neutral Athletes	X	Q
8	2	Steffie van der Peet	Netherlands	+0.158	

=== Quarterfinals ===
Heat winners advanced to the semifinals.

Heat	Rank	Name	Nation	Race 1	Race 2	Decider (i.r.)	Notes
1	1	Yana Burlakova	Individual Neutral Athletes	X	+0.041	X	Q
1	2	Lauren Bell	Great Britain	+0.131	X	+0.087	
2	1	Miriam Vece	Italy	X	+0.000	X	Q
2	2	Hetty van de Wouw	Netherlands	+0.009	X	+0.040	
3	1	Rhian Edmunds	Great Britain	X	+0.203	X	Q
3	2	Veronika Jaborníková	Czech Republic	+0.036	X	+0.019	
4	1	Alina Lysenko	Individual Neutral Athletes	+0.055	X	X	Q
4	2	Lea Friedrich	Germany	X	+0.013	+0.097	

=== Semifinals ===
Winners proceed to the gold medal final; losers proceed to the bronze medal final.

Heat	Rank	Name	Nation	Race 1	Race 2	Decider (i.r.)	Notes
1	1	Yana Burlakova	Individual Neutral Athletes	X	+0.035	X	QG
1	2	Alina Lysenko	Individual Neutral Athletes	+0.046	X	+0.028	QB
2	1	Rhian Edmunds	Great Britain	X	X		QG
2	2	Miriam Vece	Italy	+0.044	+0.004		QB

=== Finals ===
Rank	Name	Nation	Race 1	Race 2	Decider (i.r.)
Gold medal final
1st place, gold medalist(s)	Yana Burlakova	Individual Neutral Athletes	+0.070	X	X
2nd place, silver medalist(s)	Rhian Edmunds	Great Britain	X	+0.005	+0.000
Bronze medal final
3rd place, bronze medalist(s)	Alina Lysenko	Individual Neutral Athletes	X	X	
4	Miriam Vece	Italy	+0.037	+0.131	
