= 2026 UEC European Track Championships – Women's sprint =

Women's sprint at the 2026 UEC Track Elite European Championships
- Venue: Konya Velodrome, Konya
- Date: 2–3 February
- Competitors: 22

Medalists
gold medal	Emma Finucane	Great Britain
silver medal	Sophie Capewell	Great Britain
bronze medal	Alina Lysenko

The women's sprint competition at the 2026 UEC European Track Championships was held on 2 and 3 February 2026.

== Results ==
=== Qualifying ===
The top 10 riders qualified for the 1/8 finals, 11th to 22nd places qualified for the 1/16 finals.

Rank	Name	Nation	Time	Behind	Notes
1	Emma Finucane	Great Britain	9.759		Q, WR
2	Sophie Capewell	Great Britain	9.982	+0.223	Q
3	Lea Friedrich	Germany	10.010	+0.251	Q
4	Alina Lysenko	Individual Neutral Athletes	10.092	+0.333	Q
5	Pauline Grabosch	Germany	10.120	+0.361	Q
6	Hetty van de Wouw	Netherlands	10.121	+0.362	Q
7	Mathilde Gros	France	10.173	+0.414	Q
8	Yana Burlakova	Individual Neutral Athletes	10.229	+0.470	Q
9	Veronika Jaborníková	Czech Republic	10.394	+0.635	Q
10	Miriam Vece	Italy	10.397	+0.638	Q
11	Kimberly Kalee	Netherlands	10.507	+0.748	q
12	Alla Biletska	Ukraine	10.532	+0.773	q
13	Oleksandra Lohviniuk	Ukraine	10.561	+0.802	q
14	Zita Gheysens	Belgium	10.652	+0.893	q
15	Anna Jaborníková	Czech Republic	10.697	+0.938	q
16	Nicky Degrendele	Belgium	10.724	+0.965	q
17	Urszula Łoś	Poland	10.796	+1.037	q
18	Helena Casas	Spain	10.845	+1.086	q
19	Marlena Karwacka	Poland	10.899	+1.140	q
20	Lauryna Valiukevičiūtė	Lithuania	10.913	+1.154	q
21	Siria Trevisan	Italy	10.928	+1.169	q
22	Varvara Basiakova	Individual Neutral Athletes	11.093	+1.334	q

=== 1/16 finals ===
Heat winners advanced to the 1/8 finals.

Heat	Rank	Name	Nation	Time	Notes
1	1	Kimberly Kalee	Netherlands	X	Q
1	2	Varvara Basiakova	Individual Neutral Athletes	+0.232	
2	1	Alla Biletska	Ukraine	X	Q
2	2	Siria Trevisan	Italy	+0.100	
3	1	Oleksandra Lohviniuk	Ukraine	X	Q
3	2	Lauryna Valiukevičiūtė	Lithuania	REL	
4	1	Zita Gheysens	Belgium	X	Q
4	2	Marlena Karwacka	Poland	+0.092	
5	1	Helena Casas	Spain	X	Q
5	2	Anna Jaborníková	Czech Republic	REL	
6	1	Nicky Degrendele	Belgium	X	Q
6	2	Urszula Łoś	Poland	+0.004	

=== 1/8 finals ===
Heat winners advanced to the quarterfinals.

Heat	Rank	Name	Nation	Time	Notes
1	1	Emma Finucane	Great Britain	X	Q
1	2	Nicky Degrendele	Belgium	+0.278	
2	1	Sophie Capewell	Great Britain	X	Q
2	2	Helena Casas	Spain	+0.912	
3	1	Lea Friedrich	Germany	X	Q
3	2	Zita Gheysens	Belgium	+0.350	
4	1	Alina Lysenko	Individual Neutral Athletes	X	Q
4	2	Oleksandra Lohviniuk	Ukraine	+0.690	
5	1	Pauline Grabosch	Germany	X	Q
5	2	Alla Biletska	Ukraine	+0.102	
6	1	Hetty van de Wouw	Netherlands	X	Q
6	2	Kimberly Kalee	Netherlands	+0.092	
7	1	Miriam Vece	Italy	X	Q
7	2	Mathilde Gros	France	+0.102	
8	1	Yana Burlakova	Individual Neutral Athletes	X	Q
8	2	Veronika Jaborníková	Czech Republic	+0.019	

=== Quarterfinals ===
Heat winners advanced to the semifinals.

Heat	Rank	Name	Nation	Race 1	Race 2	Decider (i.r.)	Notes
1	1	Emma Finucane	Great Britain	X	X		Q
1	2	Yana Burlakova	Individual Neutral Athletes	+0.077	+0.078		
2	1	Sophie Capewell	Great Britain	X	X		Q
2	2	Miriam Vece	Italy	+0.245	+0.075		
3	1	Lea Friedrich	Germany	X	X		Q
3	2	Hetty van de Wouw	Netherlands	+0.114	+0.160		
4	1	Alina Lysenko	Individual Neutral Athletes	X	X		Q
4	2	Pauline Grabosch	Germany	+0.105	+0.285		

=== Semifinals ===
Winners proceed to the gold medal final; losers proceed to the bronze medal final.

Heat	Rank	Name	Nation	Race 1	Race 2	Decider (i.r.)	Notes
1	1	Emma Finucane	Great Britain	X	X		QG
1	2	Alina Lysenko	Individual Neutral Athletes	+0.000	+0.629		QB
2	1	Sophie Capewell	Great Britain	X	X		QG
2	2	Lea Friedrich	Germany	+0.308	+0.069		QB

=== Finals ===
Rank	Name	Nation	Race 1	Race 2	Decider (i.r.)
Gold medal final
1st place, gold medalist(s)	Emma Finucane	Great Britain	X	X	
2nd place, silver medalist(s)	Sophie Capewell	Great Britain	+0.045	+0.559	
Bronze medal final
3rd place, bronze medalist(s)	Alina Lysenko	Individual Neutral Athletes	X	X	
4	Lea Friedrich	Germany	+0.006	+0.083	
