= 2026 UCI Track Cycling World Championships – Women's keirin =

Women's keirin at the 2026 UCI Track Cycling World Championships
- Venue: Shanghai Velodrome
- Location: Shanghai, China
- Dates: 18 October
- Competitors: 35 from 22 nations

Medalists
gold medal	Alina Lysenko
silver medal	Lea Friedrich	Germany
bronze medal	Emma Finucane	Great Britain

The Women's keirin competition at the 2026 UCI Track Cycling World Championships was held on 18 October 2026.

== Results ==
=== First round ===
The first round was started at 11:08. The first two riders from each heat qualified for the quarterfinals, all other riders moved to the repechages.

Heat 1

Rank	Name	Nation	Gap	Notes
1	Mina Sato	Japan		Q
2	Yana Burlakova	Individual Neutral Athletes	+0.085	Q
3	Yeung Cho Yiu	Hong Kong	+0.187	
4	Sophie Capewell	Great Britain	+0.272	
5	Molly McGill	Australia	+0.589	
6	Ellesse Andrews	New Zealand	+0.814	
	Nur Alyssa Mohd Farid	Malaysia	DNF	

Heat 2

Rank	Name	Nation	Gap	Notes
1	Jiang Yulu	China		Q
2	Alessia McCaig	Australia	+0.491	Q
3	Nicky Degrendele	Belgium	+0.547	
4	Stefany Cuadrado	Colombia		
5	Alessa-Catriona Pröpster	Germany		
6	Veronika Tamme	Czechia		
7	Haruka Nakazawa	Japan		

Heat 3

Rank	Name	Nation	Gap	Notes
1	Wang Lijuan	China		Q
2	Lea Friedrich	Germany	+0.074	Q
3	Daniela Gaxiola	Mexico	+0.326	
4	Steffie van der Peet	Netherlands	+0.479	
5	Kristina Clonan	Australia	+0.752	
6	Miriam Vece	Italy	+0.926	
7	Ekaterina Evlanova	Individual Neutral Athletes	+2.338	

Heat 4

Rank	Name	Nation	Gap	Notes
1	Emma Finucane	Great Britain		Q
2	Lauriane Genest	Canada	+0.034	Q
3	Hetty van de Wouw	Netherlands	+0.145	
4	Aki Sakai	Japan	+0.947	
5	McKenna McKee	United States	+0.948	
6	Nikola Sibiak	Poland	+1.522	
7	Mathilde Gros	France	+1.723	

Heat 5

Rank	Name	Nation	Gap	Notes
1	Yuan Liying	China		Q
2	Alina Lysenko	Individual Neutral Athletes	+0.032	Q
3	Nurul Izzah Izzati Mohd Asri	Malaysia	+0.032	
4	Zita Gheysens	Belgium	+0.151	
5	Alla Biletska	Ukraine	+0.616	
6	Kelsey Mitchell	Canada	+0.739	
7	Makaira Wallace	Trinidad and Tobago	+1.717	

=== First round repechage ===
The first round repechage was started at 11:53. The first two riders from each heat qualified for the quarterfinals.

Heat 1

Rank	Name	Nation	Gap	Notes
1	Zita Gheysens	Belgium		Q
2	Veronika Tamme	Czechia	+0.107	Q
3	Yeung Cho Yiu	Hong Kong	+0.132	
4	Aki Sakai	Japan	+0.245	
5	Nur Alyssa Mohd Farid	Malaysia	+1.004	
6	Miriam Vece	Italy	+3.435	

Heat 3

Rank	Name	Nation	Gap	Notes
1	Kelsey Mitchell	Canada		Q
2	Mathilde Gros	France	+0.110	Q
3	Daniela Gaxiola	Mexico	+0.181	
4	McKenna McKee	United States	+0.217	
5	Stefany Cuadrado	Colombia	+0.287	
6	Molly McGill	Australia	+0.601	

Heat 2

Rank	Name	Nation	Gap	Notes
1	Haruka Nakazawa	Japan		Q
2	Steffie van der Peet	Netherlands	+0.035	Q
3	Sophie Capewell	Great Britain	+0.074	
4	Alla Biletska	Ukraine	+0.115	
5	Nikola Sibiak	Poland	+0.198	
6	Nicky Degrendele	Belgium	+0.319	

Heat 4

Rank	Name	Nation	Gap	Notes
1	Hetty van de Wouw	Netherlands		Q
2	Ellesse Andrews	New Zealand	+0.020	Q
3	Alessa-Catriona Pröpster	Germany	+0.070	
4	Ekaterina Evlanova	Individual Neutral Athletes	+0.123	
5	Kristina Clonan	Australia	+0.319	
6	Nurul Izzah Izzati Mohd Asri	Malaysia	+0.372	
7	Makaira Wallace	Trinidad and Tobago	+0.858	

=== Quarterfinals ===
The quarterfinals were started at 13:35. The first four riders from each heat qualified for the semifinals.

Heat 1

Rank	Name	Nation	Gap	Notes
1	Emma Finucane	Great Britain		Q
2	Mina Sato	Japan	+0.032	Q
3	Alina Lysenko	Individual Neutral Athletes	+0.088	Q
4	Jiang Yulu	China	+0.169	Q
5	Alessia McCaig	Australia	+0.177	
6	Kelsey Mitchell	Canada	+0.239	

Heat 2

Rank	Name	Nation	Gap	Notes
1	Lea Friedrich	Germany		Q
2	Yuan Liying	China	+0.089	Q
3	Zita Gheysens	Belgium	+0.321	Q
4	Haruka Nakazawa	Japan	+0.446	Q
5	Mathilde Gros	France	+0.483	
6	Hetty van de Wouw	Netherlands	+0.745	

Heat 3

Rank	Name	Nation	Gap	Notes
1	Wang Lijuan	China		Q
2	Lauriane Genest	Canada	+0.206	Q
3	Ellesse Andrews	New Zealand	+0.383	Q
4	Steffie van der Peet	Netherlands	+0.475	Q
5	Veronika Tamme	Czechia	+0.538	
6	Yana Burlakova	Individual Neutral Athletes	+0.561	

=== Semifinals ===
The semifinals were started at 14:36. The first three riders in each heat qualified for the final, all other riders raced for places 7 to 12.

Heat 1

Rank	Name	Nation	Gap	Notes
1	Emma Finucane	Great Britain		Q
2	Steffie van der Peet	Netherlands	+0.089	Q
3	Zita Gheysens	Belgium	+0.166	Q
4	Mina Sato	Japan	+0.259	
5	Ellesse Andrews	New Zealand	+0.417	
6	Yuan Liying	China	+0.439	

Heat 2

Rank	Name	Nation	Gap	Notes
1	Lea Friedrich	Germany		Q
2	Wang Lijuan	China	+0.016	Q
3	Alina Lysenko	Individual Neutral Athletes	+0.109	Q
4	Lauriane Genest	Canada	+0.226	
5	Jiang Yulu	China	+1.325	
6	Haruka Nakazawa	Japan	+1.637	

=== Finals ===
The finals were started at 19:18.

Small final

Rank	Name	Nation	Gap
7	Lauriane Genest	Canada	
8	Mina Sato	Japan	+0.051
9	Haruka Nakazawa	Japan	+0.224
10	Jiang Yulu	China	+0.614
11	Ellesse Andrews	New Zealand	+0.769
12	Yuan Liying	China	REL

Final

Rank	Name	Nation	Gap
1st place, gold medalist(s)	Alina Lysenko	Individual Neutral Athletes	
2nd place, silver medalist(s)	Lea Friedrich	Germany	+0.006
3rd place, bronze medalist(s)	Emma Finucane	Great Britain	+0.014
4	Wang Lijuan	China	+0.113
5	Steffie van der Peet	Netherlands	+0.157
6	Zita Gheysens	Belgium	+0.217
