= Track cycling at the 2026 Commonwealth Games – Women's team sprint =

Cycling Track – Women's team sprint at the 2026 Commonwealth Games
- Venue: Sir Chris Hoy Velodrome
- Dates: 30 July
- Winning time: 46.760

Medalists
gold medal	Rhian Edmunds; Emma Finucane; Lowri Thomas	Wales
silver medal	Sophie Capewell; Katy Marchant; Rhianna Parris-Smith	England
bronze medal	Lauren Bell; Iona Moir; Madeleine Silcock	Scotland

The women's team sprint at the 2026 Commonwealth Games was part of the cycling programme, and took place on 30 July 2026.

== Records ==
Prior to this competition, the existing world and Games records were as follows:

World record	Great Britain (Katy Marchant, Emma Finucane, Sophie Capewell)	45.186	Saint-Quentin-en-Yvelines, France	5 August 2024
Games record	New Zealand (Matthew Glaetzer, Leigh Hoffman, Matthew Richardson)	47.425	Lee Valley Velodrome, London	29 July 2022

== Schedule ==
The schedule is as follows:

All times are British Summer Time (UTC+1)

Date	Time	Round
Thursday 30 July 2026	12:18	Qualifying
Thursday 30 July 2026	18:10	Finals

== Results ==
=== Qualifying ===
The two fastest teams advanced to the gold medal final. The next two fastest teams advanced to the bronze medal final

Rank	Nation	Time	Behind	Notes
1	Wales; Lowri Thomas; Emma Finucane; Rhian Edmunds	46.972		QG, GR
2	England; Rhianna Parris-Smith; Sophie Capewell; Katy Marchant	47.152	+0.180	QG
3	Scotland; Madeleine Silcock; Iona Moir; Lauren Bell	47.451	+0.479	QB
4	Australia; Molly McGill; Kristina Clonan; Alessia McCaig	47.618	+0.646	QB
5	New Zealand; Rebecca Petch; Ellesse Andrews; Olivia King	47.852	+0.880	

=== Finals ===
Rank	Nation	Time	Behind	Notes
Gold medal final
1st place, gold medalist(s)	Wales; Lowri Thomas; Emma Finucane; Rhian Edmunds	46.760		GR
2nd place, silver medalist(s)	England; Rhianna Parris-Smith; Sophie Capewell; Katy Marchant	46.901	+0.141	
Bronze medal final
4	Australia; Molly McGill; Kristina Clonan; Alessia McCaig	47.779	+0.594	
3rd place, bronze medalist(s)	Scotland; Madeleine Silcock; Iona Moir; Lauren Bell	47.185		
