= 2025 UEC European Track Championships – Women's 1 km time trial =

Women's 1 km time trial at the 2025 UEC European Track Championships
- Venue: Velodroom Limburg, Heusden-Zolder
- Date: 15 February
- Competitors: 19 from 13 nations
- Winning time: 1:04.497

Medalists
gold medal	Hetty van de Wouw	Netherlands
silver medal	Martina Fidanza	Italy
bronze medal	Clara Schneider	Germany

The women's 1 km time trial competition at the 2025 UEC European Track Championships was held on 15 February 2025.

== Results ==
=== Qualifying ===
The top 8 riders qualified for the final.

Rank	Name	Nation	Time	Behind	Notes
1	Hetty van de Wouw	Netherlands	1:04.729		Q
2	Clara Schneider	Germany	1:05.479	+0.750	Q
3	Martina Fidanza	Italy	1:05.834	+1.105	Q
4	Franziska Brauße	Germany	1:06.520	+1.791	Q
5	Paulina Petri	Poland	1:06.832	+2.103	Q
6	Taky Marie-Divine Kouamé	France	1:06.835	+2.106	Q
7	Marith Vanhove	Belgium	1:07.143	+2.414	Q
8	Neah Evans	Great Britain	1:07.179	+2.450	Q
9	Alina Lysenko	Individual Neutral Athletes	1:07.696	+2.967	
10	Erin Creighton	Ireland	1:08.580	+3.851	
11	Oleksandra Lohviniuk	Ukraine	1:08.814	+4.085	
12	Alla Biletska	Ukraine	1:08.881	+4.152	
13	Beatrice Bertolini	Italy	1:08.988	+4.259	
14	Anna Jaborníková	Czech Republic	1:09.030	+4.301	
15	Helena Casas	Spain	1:09.396	+4.667	
16	Emma Jeffers	Ireland	1:09.640	+4.911	
17	Isabel Ferreres	Spain	1:11.015	+6.286	
18	Iona Moir	Great Britain	1:12.799	+8.070	
19	Marija Pavlović	Serbia	1:22.207	+17.478	

=== Final ===
Rank	Name	Nation	Time	Behind	Notes
1st place, gold medalist(s)	Hetty van de Wouw	Netherlands	1:04.497		WR
2nd place, silver medalist(s)	Martina Fidanza	Italy	1:05.969	+1.472	
3rd place, bronze medalist(s)	Clara Schneider	Germany	1:06.745	+2.248	
4	Franziska Brauße	Germany	1:06.959	+2.462	
5	Paulina Petri	Poland	1:07.172	+2.675	
6	Taky Marie-Divine Kouamé	France	1:07.293	+2.796	
7	Marith Vanhove	Belgium	1:07.690	+3.193	
8	Neah Evans	Great Britain	1:08.015	+3.518	
