= 2023 UEC European Track Championships – Women's sprint =

Women's sprint at the 2023 UEC European Track Championships
- Venue: Tissot Velodrome, Grenchen
- Dates: 9–10 February
- Competitors: 21 from 12 nations

Medalists
gold medal	Lea Sophie Friedrich	Germany
silver medal	Pauline Grabosch	Germany
bronze medal	Sophie Capewell	Great Britain

The women's sprint competition at the 2023 UEC European Track Championships was held on 9 and 10 February 2023.

== Results ==
=== Qualifying ===
The top 11 riders qualified for the 1/8 finals, 12th to 21st places qualified for the 1/16 finals.

Rank	Name	Nation	Time	Behind	Notes
1	Mathilde Gros	France	10.524		Q
2	Lea Sophie Friedrich	Germany	10.565	+0.041	Q
3	Sophie Capewell	Great Britain	10.570	+0.046	Q
4	Pauline Grabosch	Germany	10.606	+0.082	Q
5	Hetty van de Wouw	Netherlands	10.639	+0.115	Q
6	Emma Finucane	Great Britain	10.743	+0.219	Q
7	Taky Marie-Divine Kouamé	France	10.777	+0.253	Q
8	Nicky Degrendele	Belgium	10.832	+0.308	Q
9	Veronika Jaborníková	Czech Republic	10.862	+0.338	Q
10	Miriam Vece	Italy	10.888	+0.364	Q
11	Steffie van der Peet	Netherlands	10.909	+0.385	Q
12	Nikola Sibiak	Poland	10.912	+0.388	q
13	Miglė Lendel	Lithuania	11.026	+0.502	q
14	Alla Biletska	Ukraine	11.081	+0.557	q
15	Paulina Petri	Poland	11.100	+0.576	q
16	Orla Walsh	Ireland	11.159	+0.635	q
17	Oleksandra Lohviniuk	Ukraine	11.272	+0.748	q
18	Helena Casas	Spain	11.349	+0.825	q
19	Julie Nicolaes	Belgium	11.352	+0.828	q
20	Giada Capobianchi	Italy	11.371	+0.847	q
21	Anna Jaborníková	Czech Republic	11.425	+0.901	q

=== 1/16 finals ===
Heat winners advanced to the 1/8 finals.

Heat	Rank	Name	Nation	Time	Notes
1	1	Nikola Sibiak	Poland	X	Q
1	2	Anna Jaborníková	Czech Republic	+0.312	
2	1	Miglė Lendel	Lithuania	X	Q
2	2	Giada Capobianchi	Italy	+0.082	
3	1	Alla Biletska	Ukraine	X	Q
3	2	Julie Nicolaes	Belgium	+0.630	
4	1	Paulina Petri	Poland	X	Q
4	2	Helena Casas	Spain	+0.060	
5	1	Oleksandra Lohviniuk	Ukraine	X	Q
5	2	Orla Walsh	Ireland	+0.070	

=== 1/8 finals ===
Heat winners advanced to the quarterfinals.

Heat	Rank	Name	Nation	Time	Notes
1	1	Mathilde Gros	France	X	Q
1	2	Oleksandra Lohviniuk	Ukraine	+0.077	
2	1	Lea Sophie Friedrich	Germany	X	Q
2	2	Paulina Petri	Poland	+0.089	
3	1	Sophie Capewell	Great Britain	X	Q
3	2	Alla Biletska	Ukraine	+0.094	
4	1	Pauline Grabosch	Germany	X	Q
4	2	Miglė Lendel	Lithuania	+0.316	
5	1	Hetty van de Wouw	Netherlands	X	Q
5	2	Nikola Sibiak	Poland	+0.125	
6	1	Emma Finucane	Great Britain	X	Q
6	2	Steffie van der Peet	Netherlands	+0.000	
7	1	Taky Marie-Divine Kouamé	France	X	Q
7	2	Miriam Vece	Italy	+0.050	
8	1	Nicky Degrendele	Belgium		Q
8	2	Veronika Jaborníková	Czech Republic	+0.148	

=== Quarterfinals ===
Matches are extended to a best-of-three format hereon; winners proceed to the semifinals.

Heat	Rank	Name	Nation	Race 1	Race 2	Decider (i.r.)	Notes
1	1	Mathilde Gros	France	X	X		Q
1	2	Nicky Degrendele	Belgium	+0.044	+0.084		
2	1	Lea Sophie Friedrich	Germany	X	X		Q
2	2	Taky Marie-Divine Kouamé	France	+0.083	+0.135		
3	1	Sophie Capewell	Great Britain	X	X		Q
3	2	Emma Finucane	Great Britain	+0.028	+0.005		
4	1	Pauline Grabosch	Germany	X	X		Q
4	2	Hetty van de Wouw	Netherlands	+0.101	+0.119		

=== Semifinals ===
Winners proceed to the gold medal final; losers proceed to the bronze medal final.

Heat	Rank	Name	Nation	Race 1	Race 2	Decider (i.r.)	Notes
1	1	Pauline Grabosch	Germany	+0.030	X	X	QG
1	2	Mathilde Gros	France	X	+0.053	+0.036	QB
2	1	Lea Sophie Friedrich	Germany	X	X		QG
2	2	Sophie Capewell	Great Britain	+0.129	+0.118		QB

=== Finals ===
Rank	Name	Nation	Race 1	Race 2	Decider (i.r.)
Gold medal final
1st place, gold medalist(s)	Lea Sophie Friedrich	Germany	X	X	
2nd place, silver medalist(s)	Pauline Grabosch	Germany	+0.088	+0.110	
Bronze medal final
3rd place, bronze medalist(s)	Sophie Capewell	Great Britain	X	X	
4	Mathilde Gros	France	+0.098	+0.122	
