= 2021 UCI Track Cycling World Championships – Women's 500 m time trial =

Women's 500 m time trial at the 2021 UCI Track Cycling World Championships
- Venue: Vélodrome Couvert Régional Jean Stablinski
- Location: Roubaix, France
- Dates: 23 October
- Competitors: 14 from 8 nations
- Winning time: 33.057

Medalists
gold medal	Lea Friedrich	Germany
silver medal	Anastasia Voynova
bronze medal	Daria Shmeleva

The Women's 500 m time trial competition at the 2021 UCI Track Cycling World Championships was held on 23 October 2021.

== Results ==
=== Qualifying ===
The Qualifyingwas started 10:46. The top eight riders qualified for the final.

Rank	Name	Nation	Time	Behind	Notes
1	Anastasia Voynova	Russian Cycling Federation	33.183		Q
2	Lea Friedrich	Germany	33.358	+0.175	Q
3	Daria Shmeleva	Russian Cycling Federation	33.369	+0.186	Q
4	Miriam Vece	Italy	33.374	+0.191	Q
5	Pauline Grabosch	Germany	33.438	+0.255	Q
6	Martha Bayona	Colombia	33.552	+0.369	Q
7	Yana Tyshchenko	Russian Cycling Federation	33.660	+0.477	Q
8	Alessa-Catriona Pröpster	Germany	34.674	+1.491	Q
9	Marlena Karwacka	Poland	34.832	+1.649	
10	Helena Casas	Spain	35.337	+2.154	
11	Alla Biletska	Ukraine	35.575	+2.392	
12	Veronika Jaborníková	Czech Republic	35.662	+2.469	
13	Marianis Salazar	Colombia	36.290	+3.107	
14	Ese Ukpeseraye	Nigeria	38.779	+4.596	

=== Final ===
The final was started at 17:30.

Rank	Name	Nation	Time	Behind	Notes
1st place, gold medalist(s)	Lea Friedrich	Germany	33.057		
2nd place, silver medalist(s)	Anastasia Voynova	Russian Cycling Federation	33.163	+0.106	
3rd place, bronze medalist(s)	Daria Shmeleva	Russian Cycling Federation	33.164	+0.107	
4	Pauline Grabosch	Germany	33.177	+0.120	
5	Miriam Vece	Italy	33.300	+0.243	
6	Yana Tyshchenko	Russian Cycling Federation	33.337	+0.280	
7	Martha Bayona	Colombia	33.546	+0.489	
8	Alessa-Catriona Pröpster	Germany	34.814	+1.757	
