= 2023 UEC European Track Championships – Women's team sprint =

Women's team sprint at the 2023 UEC European Track Championships
- Venue: Tissot Velodrome, Grenchen
- Date: 8 February
- Competitors: 29 from 9 nations
- Winning time: 46.865

Medalists
gold medal	Lea Friedrich; Pauline Grabosch; Emma Hinze; Alessa-Catriona Pröpster	Germany
silver medal	Lauren Bell; Emma Finucane; Katy Marchant; Sophie Capewell	Great Britain
bronze medal	Kyra Lamberink; Steffie van der Peet; Hetty van de Wouw	Netherlands

The women's team sprint competition at the 2023 UEC European Track Championships was held on 8 February 2023.

== Results ==
=== Qualifying ===
The eight fastest teams advanced to the first round.

Rank	Nation	Time	Behind	Notes
1	Germany; Pauline Grabosch; Emma Hinze; Alessa-Catriona Pröpster	47.470		Q
2	France; Taky Marie-Divine Kouamé; Julie Michaux; Mathilde Gros	47.785	+0.315	Q
3	Great Britain; Lauren Bell; Sophie Capewell; Katy Marchant	47.808	+0.338	Q
4	Netherlands; Kyra Lamberink; Hetty van de Wouw; Steffie van der Peet	47.877	+0.407	Q
5	Poland; Marlena Karwacka; Urszula Łoś; Nikola Sibiak	47.919	+0.449	Q
6	Belgium; Elke Vanhoof; Valerie Jenaer; Nicky Degrendele	49.083	+1.613	Q
7	Czech Republic; Natálie Mikšaníková; Veronika Jaborníková; Anna Jaborníková	49.313	+1.843	Q
8	Italy; Giada Capobianchi; Miriam Vece; Rachele Barbieri	49.558	+2.088	Q
9	Ukraine; Yelyzaveta Holod; Alla Biletska; Oleksandra Lohviniuk	52.009	+4.539	

=== First round ===
First round heats were held as follows:
Heat 1: 4th v 5th fastest
Heat 2: 3rd v 6th fastest
Heat 3: 2nd v 7th fastest
Heat 4: 1st v 8th fastest

The heat winners were ranked on time, from which the top 2 proceeded to the gold medal final and the other 2 proceeded to the bronze medal final.

Heat	Rank	Nation	Time	Behind	Notes
1	1	Netherlands; Kyra Lamberink; Steffie van der Peet; Hetty van de Wouw	47.368		QB
1	2	Poland; Marlena Karwacka; Urszula Łoś; Nikola Sibiak	47.420	+0.052	
2	1	Great Britain; Lauren Bell; Sophie Capewell; Emma Finucane	47.156		QG
2	2	Belgium; Elke Vanhoof; Valerie Jenaer; Nicky Degrendele	48.824	+1.668	
3	1	France; Mathilde Gros; Taky Marie-Divine Kouamé; Julie Michaux	47.748		QB
3	2	Czech Republic; Anna Jaborníková; Veronika Jaborníková; Natálie Mikšaníková	49.353	+1.605	
4	1	Germany; Lea Friedrich; Pauline Grabosch; Emma Hinze	46.456		QG
4	2	Italy; Rachele Barbieri; Giada Capobianchi; Miriam Vece	49.001	+2.545	

=== Finals ===
Rank	Nation	Time	Behind	Notes
Gold medal final
1st place, gold medalist(s)	Germany; Lea Friedrich; Pauline Grabosch; Emma Hinze	46.865		
2nd place, silver medalist(s)	Great Britain; Lauren Bell; Emma Finucane; Katy Marchant	47.639	+0.774	
Bronze medal final
3rd place, bronze medalist(s)	Netherlands; Kyra Lamberink; Steffie van der Peet; Hetty van de Wouw	47.431		
4	France; Mathilde Gros; Taky Marie-Divine Kouamé; Julie Michaux	49.181	+1.750	
