= 2025 UEC European Track Championships – Women's team sprint =

Women's team sprint at the 2025 UEC European Track Championships
- Venue: Velodroom Limburg, Heusden-Zolder
- Date: 12 February
- Competitors: 23 from 7 nations
- Winning time: 46.322

Medalists
gold medal	Kimberly Kalee; Hetty van de Wouw; Steffie van der Peet	Netherlands
silver medal	Lauren Bell; Rhian Edmunds; Rhianna Parris-Smith	Great Britain
bronze medal	Lea Friedrich; Pauline Grabosch; Clara Schneider	Germany

The women's team sprint competition at the 2025 UEC European Track Championships was held on 12 February 2025.

== Results ==
=== Qualifying ===
All teams advanced to the first round.

Rank	Nation	Time	Behind	Notes
1	Netherlands; Kimberly Kalee; Hetty van de Wouw; Steffie van der Peet	46.833		Q
2	Germany; Pauline Grabosch; Lea Friedrich; Clara Schneider	47.108	+0.275	Q
3	Great Britain; Rhianna Parris-Smith; Lauren Bell; Rhian Edmunds	47.168	+0.335	Q
4	Poland; Marlena Karwacka; Nikola Seremak; Urszula Łoś	48.020	+1.187	Q
5	Italy; Siria Trevisan; Matilde Cenci; Miriam Vece	49.066	+2.233	Q
6	Czech Republic; Anna Jaborníková; Veronika Jaborníková; Sára Peterková	49.706	+2.873	Q
7	Ukraine; Viktoriia Polishchuk; Oleksandra Lohviniuk; Alla Biletska	50.191	+3.358	Q

=== First round ===
First round heats were held as follows:
Heat 1: 4th v 5th fastest
Heat 2: 3rd v 6th fastest
Heat 3: 2nd v 7th fastest
Heat 4: 1st alone

The heat winners were ranked on time, from which the top 2 proceeded to the gold medal final and the other 2 proceeded to the bronze medal final.

Heat	Rank	Nation	Time	Notes
1	1	Poland; Marlena Karwacka; Nikola Seremak; Paulina Petri	47.949	QB
1	2	Italy; Miriam Vece; Siria Trevisan; Beatrice Bertolini	48.817	
2	1	Great Britain; Rhianna Parris-Smith; Lauren Bell; Rhian Edmunds	46.905	QG
2	2	Czech Republic; Anna Jaborníková; Veronika Jaborníková; Sára Peterková	49.434	
3	1	Germany; Lea Friedrich; Pauline Grabosch; Clara Schneider	47.060	QB
3	2	Ukraine; Alla Biletska; Oleksandra Lohviniuk; Viktoriia Polishchuk	49.976	
4	1	Netherlands; Kimberly Kalee; Hetty van de Wouw; Steffie van der Peet	46.764	QG

=== Finals ===
Rank	Nation	Time	Behind	Notes
Gold medal final
1st place, gold medalist(s)	Netherlands; Kimberly Kalee; Hetty van de Wouw; Steffie van der Peet	46.322		
2nd place, silver medalist(s)	Great Britain; Lauren Bell; Rhian Edmunds; Rhianna Parris-Smith	46.929	+0.607	
Bronze medal final
3rd place, bronze medalist(s)	Germany; Lea Friedrich; Pauline Grabosch; Clara Schneider	47.333		
4	Poland; Marlena Karwacka; Urszula Łoś; Nikola Seremak	47.952	+0.619	
