= 2026 UEC European Track Championships – Women's team sprint =

Women's team sprint at the 2026 UEC Track Elite European Championships
- Venue: Konya Velodrome, Konya
- Date: 1 February
- Competitors: 32 from 10 nations
- Teams: 10
- Winning time: 45.710

Medalists
gold medal	Pauline Grabosch; Lea Friedrich; Clara Schneider	Germany
silver medal	Sophie Capewell; Rhianna Parris-Smith; Lowri Thomas; Lauren Bell	Great Britain
bronze medal	Kimberly Kalee; Hetty van de Wouw; Steffie van der Peet	Netherlands

The women's team sprint competition at the 2026 UEC European Track Championships was held on 1 February 2026.

== Results ==
=== Qualifying ===
The eight fastest teams advanced to the first round.

Rank	Nation	Time	Behind	Notes
1	Netherlands; Kimberly Kalee; Hetty van de Wouw; Steffie van der Peet	45.832		Q
2	Germany; Clara Schneider; Lea Friedrich; Pauline Grabosch	46.276	+0.444	Q
3	Great Britain; Rhianna Parris-Smith; Lowri Thomas; Lauren Bell	46.461	+0.629	Q
4	France; Taky Marie-Divine Kouamé; Marie-Louisa Drouode; Mathilde Gros	46.786	+0.954	Q
5	Poland; Marlena Karwacka; Urszula Łoś; Nikola Sibiak	47.342	+1.510	Q
6	Czech Republic; Sára Peterková; Veronika Jaborníková; Anna Jaborníková	47.726	+1.894	Q
7	Italy; Siria Trevisan; Matilde Cenci; Miriam Vece	47.765	+1.933	Q
8	Ukraine; Viktoriia Polishchuk; Oleksandra Lohviniuk; Alla Biletska	48.474	+2.642	Q
9	Lithuania; Olivija Baleišytė; Lauryna Valiukevičiūtė; Akvilė Gedraitytė	52.584	+6.752	
10	Serbia; Nikolija Kulinčević; Irina Stevanović; Marija Pavlović	1:00.941	+15.109	

=== First round ===
First round heats were held as follows:
Heat 1: 4th v 5th fastest
Heat 2: 3rd v 6th fastest
Heat 3: 2nd v 7th fastest
Heat 4: 1st v 8th fastest

The heat winners were ranked on time, from which the top 2 proceeded to the gold medal final and the other 2 proceeded to the bronze medal final.

Heat	Rank	Nation	Time	Notes
1	1	France; Taky Marie-Divine Kouamé; Marie-Louisa Drouode; Mathilde Gros	47.128	QB
1	2	Poland; Nikola Seremak; Marlena Karwacka; Nikola Sibiak	47.340	
2	1	Great Britain; Lowri Thomas; Sophie Capewell; Rhianna Parris-Smith	45.931	QG
2	2	Czech Republic; Veronika Jaborníková; Anna Jaborníková; Sára Peterková	47.831	
3	1	Germany; Pauline Grabosch; Lea Friedrich; Clara Schneider	45.943	QG
3	2	Italy; Miriam Vece; Siria Trevisan; Matilde Cenci	48.886	
4	1	Netherlands; Hetty van de Wouw; Steffie van der Peet; Kimberly Kalee	46.251	QB
4	2	Ukraine; Oleksandra Lohviniuk; Alla Biletska; Viktoriia Polishchuk	48.307	

=== Finals ===
Rank	Nation	Time	Behind	Notes
Gold medal final
1st place, gold medalist(s)	Germany; Lea Friedrich; Pauline Grabosch; Clara Schneider	45.710		
2nd place, silver medalist(s)	Great Britain; Sophie Capewell; Rhianna Parris-Smith; Lowri Thomas	45.713	+0.003	
Bronze medal final
3rd place, bronze medalist(s)	Netherlands; Kimberly Kalee; Hetty van de Wouw; Steffie van der Peet	45.736		
4	France; Marie-Louisa Drouode; Mathilde Gros; Taky Marie-Divine Kouamé	46.896	+1.160	
