= 2022 UCI Track Cycling World Championships – Women's keirin =

Women's keirin at the 2022 UCI Track Cycling World Championships
- Venue: Vélodrome National
- Location: Saint-Quentin-en-Yvelines, France
- Dates: 16 October
- Competitors: 28 from 20 nations

Medalists
gold medal	Lea Friedrich	Germany
silver medal	Mina Sato	Japan
bronze medal	Steffie van der Peet	Netherlands

The Women's keirin competition at the 2022 UCI Track Cycling World Championships was held on 16 October 2022.

== Results ==
=== First round ===
The first round was started at 12:08. The first two riders from each qualified for the second round, all other riders moved to the repechages.

Heat 1

Rank	Name	Nation	Gap	Notes
1	Lea Friedrich	Germany		Q
2	Helena Casas	Spain	+0.137	Q
3	Nicky Degrendele	Belgium	+0.155	
4	Steffie van der Peet	Netherlands	+0.221	
5	Marlena Karwacka	Poland	+0.267	

Heat 3

Rank	Name	Nation	Gap	Notes
1	Mathilde Gros	France		Q
2	Riyu Ohta	Japan	+0.052	Q
3	Sophie Capewell	Great Britain	+0.134	
4	Miriam Vece	Italy	+0.730	
5	Anis Rosidi	Malaysia	+0.852	
6	Jackie Boyle	Canada	+0.884	

Heat 5

Rank	Name	Nation	Gap	Notes
1	Taky Marie-Divine Kouamé	France		
2	Martha Bayona	Colombia	+0.028	
3	Urszula Łoś	Poland	+0.085	
4	Daniela Gaxiola	Mexico	+0.200	
5	Fuko Umekawa	Japan	+0.569	
6	Lauriane Genest	Canada	+0.768	

Heat 2

Rank	Name	Nation	Gap	Notes
1	Shanne Braspennincx	Netherlands		Q
2	Olena Starikova	Ukraine	+0.041	Q
3	Mina Sato	Japan	+0.047	
4	Alessa-Catriona Pröpster	Germany	+0.053	
5	Yeung Cho Yiu	Hong Kong	+0.183	

Heat 4

Rank	Name	Nation	Gap	Notes
1	Kelsey Mitchell	Canada		
2	Ellesse Andrews	New Zealand	+0.140	
3	Kristina Clonan	Australia	+0.160	
4	Veronika Jaborníková	Czech Republic	+0.524	
5	Bao Shanju	China	+1.584	
–	Kayla Hankins	United States	Did not finish	

=== First round repechage ===
The first round repechage was started at 12:39. The first two riders from each heat qualified for the quarterfinals.

Heat 1

Rank	Name	Nation	Gap	Notes
1	Daniela Gaxiola	Mexico		Q
2	Jackie Boyle	Canada	+0.078	Q
3	Nicky Degrendele	Belgium	+0.131	
4	Veronika Jaborníková	Czech Republic	+0.180	

Heat 3

Rank	Name	Nation	Gap	Notes
1	Sophie Capewell	Great Britain		Q
2	Marlena Karwacka	Poland	+0.079	Q
3	Alessa-Catriona Pröpster	Germany	+0.209	
4	Lauriane Genest	Canada	+0.315	
5	Bao Shanju	China	+0.423	

Heat 2

Rank	Name	Nation	Gap	Notes
1	Mina Sato	Japan		Q
2	Steffie van der Peet	Netherlands	+0.082	Q
3	Miriam Vece	Italy	+0.453	
4	Fuko Umekawa	Japan	+1.059	
–	Kayla Hankins	United States	Did not start	

Heat 4

Rank	Name	Nation	Gap	Notes
1	Urszula Łoś	Poland		Q
2	Kristina Clonan	Australia	+0.183	Q
3	Anis Rosidi	Malaysia	+0.301	
4	Yeung Cho Yiu	Hong Kong	+0.426	

=== Quarterfinals ===
The quarterfinals were started at 14:15. The first four riders from each heat qualified for the semifinals.

Heat 1

Rank	Name	Nation	Gap	Notes
1	Mina Sato	Japan		Q
2	Sophie Capewell	Great Britain	+0.457	Q
3	Lea Friedrich	Germany	+0.589	Q
4	Kelsey Mitchell	Canada	+0.600	Q
5	Kristina Clonan	Australia	+0.707	
6	Olena Starikova	Ukraine	+0.816	

Heat 3

Rank	Name	Nation	Gap	Notes
1	Martha Bayona	Colombia		Q
2	Mathilde Gros	France	+0.015	Q
3	Ellesse Andrews	New Zealand	+0.027	Q
4	Steffie van der Peet	Netherlands	+0.050	Q
5	Helena Casas	Spain	+0.107	
6	Jackie Boyle	Canada	+0.180	

Heat 2

Rank	Name	Nation	Gap	Notes
1	Shanne Braspennincx	Netherlands		Q
2	Daniela Gaxiola	Mexico	+0.263	Q
3	Taky Marie-Divine Kouamé	France	+0.398	Q
4	Urszula Łoś	Poland	+0.448	Q
5	Riyu Ohta	Japan	+0.914	
6	Marlena Karwacka	Poland	+0.943	

=== Semifinals ===
The semifinals were started at 15:31. The first three riders in each heat qualified for the final, all other riders raced for places 7 to 12.

Heat 1

Rank	Name	Nation	Gap	Notes
1	Mina Sato	Japan		Q
2	Steffie van der Peet	Netherlands	+0.062	Q
3	Ellesse Andrews	New Zealand	+0.082	Q
4	Daniela Gaxiola	Mexico	+0.147	
5	Sophie Capewell	Great Britain	+0.259	
6	Taky Marie-Divine Kouamé	France	+1.671	

Heat 2

Rank	Name	Nation	Gap	Notes
1	Shanne Braspennincx	Netherlands		Q
2	Lea Friedrich	Germany	+0.022	Q
3	Mathilde Gros	France	+0.065	Q
4	Urszula Łoś	Poland	+0.099	
5	Martha Bayona	Colombia	+0.153	
6	Kelsey Mitchell	Canada	+0.245	

=== Finals ===
The finals were started at 16:04.

==== Small final ====
Rank	Name	Nation	Gap	Notes
7	Martha Bayona	Colombia		
8	Taky Marie-Divine Kouamé	France		
9	Daniela Gaxiola	Mexico		
10	Urszula Łoś	Poland		
11	Kelsey Mitchell	Canada		
12	Sophie Capewell	Great Britain		

==== Final ====
Rank	Name	Nation	Gap	Notes
1st place, gold medalist(s)	Lea Friedrich	Germany		
2nd place, silver medalist(s)	Mina Sato	Japan		
3rd place, bronze medalist(s)	Steffie van der Peet	Netherlands		
4	Mathilde Gros	France		
5	Ellesse Andrews	New Zealand		
6	Shanne Braspennincx	Netherlands		
