= Vlas Shichkin =

Russian cyclist (born 2002)

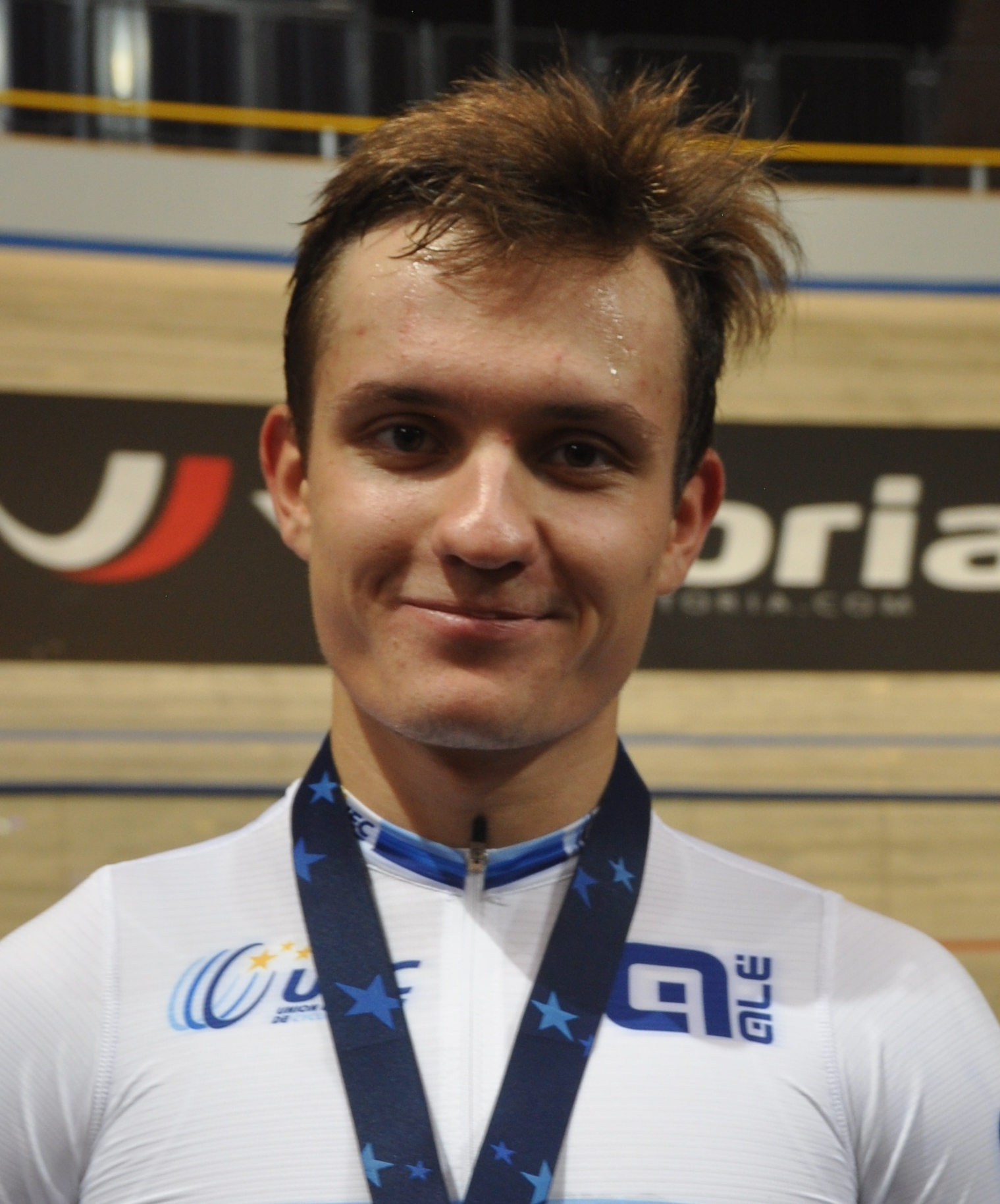
- Shichkin in 2021

Personal information
- Born: 25 January 2002 (age 24)

Cycling career
- Sport: Cycling
- Disciplines: Track; Road
- Role: Rider
Medal record
Men's track cycling
Representing Russia
European Championships
| Bronze medal – third place | 2021 Grenchen | Points race |

Vlas Shichkin (born 25 January 2002; Russian: Влас Алексеевич Шичкин) is a Russian road and track cyclist.

== Major results ==
=== Track ===
2019
UCI World Junior Championships

1st Points race
3rd Team pursuit

UEC European Junior Championships

1st Points race
1st Madison (with Ilia Schegolkov)
2nd Team pursuit

2021
UEC European Under-23 Championships

1st Points race
1st Team pursuit
2nd Madison (with Ilia Shchegolkov)

National Championships

1st Madison (with Gleb Syritsa)
1st Points race

3rd Points race, UEC European Championships

=== Road ===
2017
2nd Road race, European Youth Summer Olympic Festival
2019
2nd Gran Premio Eccellenze Valli del Soligo
2020
1st Overall Manavgat Side Junior

1st Stage 1 (ITT)

5th Overall Velo Alanya Junior
2025
9th Prueba Villafranca de Ordizia
