= Eddy Le Huitouze =

French cyclist

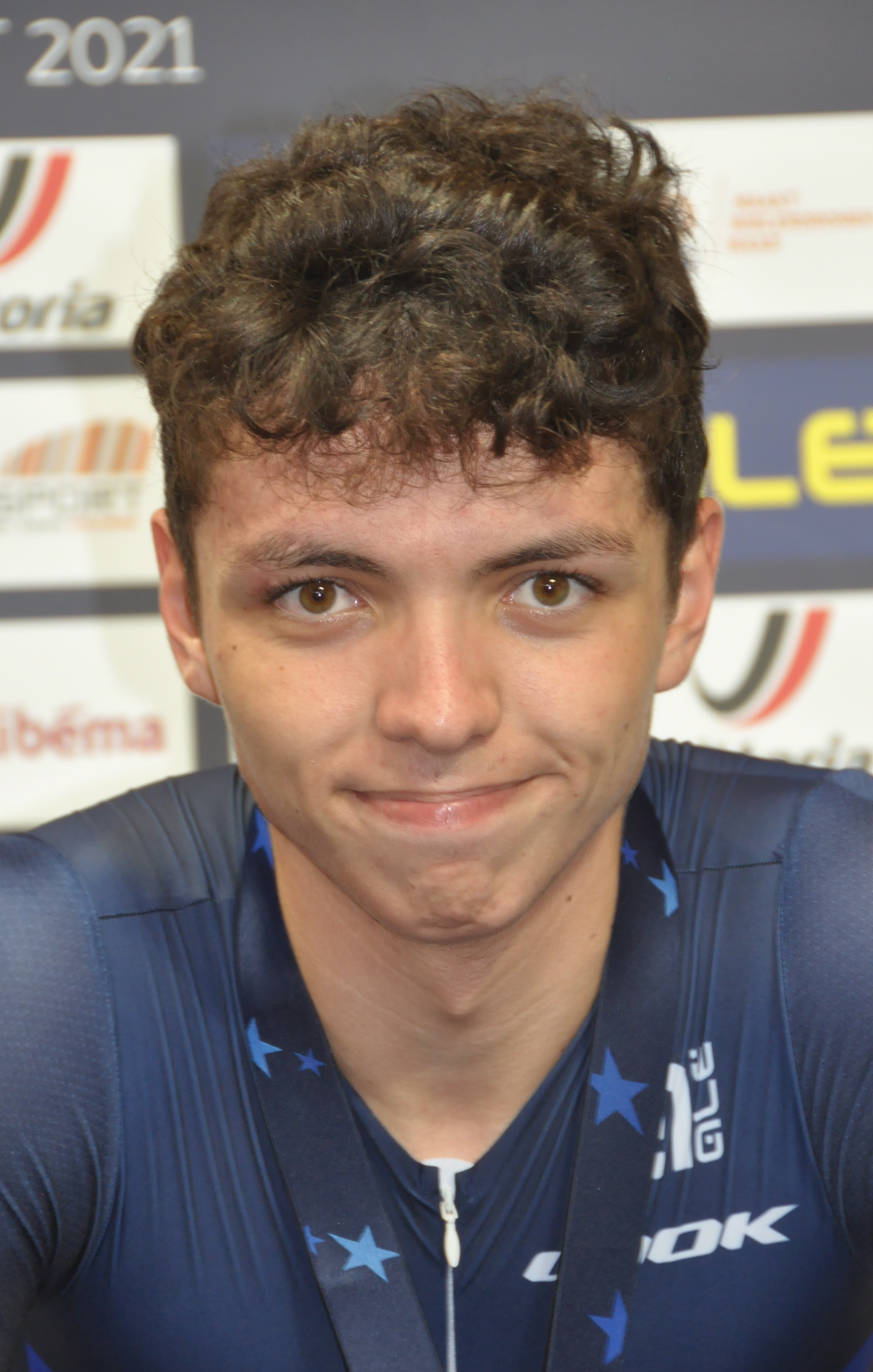
- Le Huitouze in 2021

Personal information
- Born: 3 April 2003 (age 23) Lorient, France
- Height: 1.84 m (6 ft 0 in)
- Weight: 71 kg (157 lb)

Cycling career
- Sport: Cycling
- Current team: Groupama–FDJ United
- Disciplines: Road; Track
- Role: Rider

Amateur team
- 2010–2021: EC Pluvignoise

Professional teams
- 2022–2023: Équipe Continentale Groupama–FDJ
- 2024–: Groupama–FDJ
Medal record
Representing France
Road cycling
European Under-23 Championships
Bronze medal – third place	2022 Anadia	Time trial
European Junior Championships
Bronze medal – third place	2021 Trentino	Time trial
Track cycling
European U23 & Junior Championships
Silver medal – second place	2021 Apeldoorn	Junior team pursuit
Bronze medal – third place	2022 Anadia	U23 team pursuit
Bronze medal – third place	2020 Fiorenzuola d'Arda	Junior omnium
Bronze medal – third place	2021 Apeldoorn	Junior omnium

Eddy Le Huitouze (born 3 April 2003) is a French road and track cyclist, who currently rides for UCI WorldTeam Groupama–FDJ United.

== Major results ==
=== Road ===
2020
1st Time trial, National Junior Championships
8th Time trial, UEC European Junior Championships
2021
3rd Time trial, UEC European Junior Championships
3rd Chrono des Nations Juniors
5th Time trial, UCI World Junior Championships
2022
1st Time trial, National Under-23 Championships
3rd Time trial, UEC European Under-23 Championships
7th Time trial, UCI World Under-23 Championships
8th Chrono des Nations Under-23
2023
1st Time trial, National Under-23 Championships
7th Paris–Roubaix Espoirs
9th Time trial, UEC European Under-23 Championships
2024
9th Overall Tour Poitou-Charentes en Nouvelle-Aquitaine
2025
10th La Roue Tourangelle

=== Track ===
2020
3rd Omnium, UEC European Junior Championships
2021
National Junior Championships

1st Individual pursuit
1st Team pursuit

UEC European Junior Championships

2nd Team pursuit
3rd Omnium

3rd Team pursuit, National Championships
2022
1st Team pursuit, UCI Nations Cup, Glasgow
3rd Team pursuit, UEC European Under-23 Championships
