= Madeleine Silcock =

British track cyclist

Cycling career
- Sport: Cycling
- Discipline: Track
- Role: Rider
- Rider type: Sprinter
Medal record
Women's track cycling
Representing Scotland
Commonwealth Games
Bronze medal – third place	2026 Glasgow	Team sprint

Madeleine Silcock is a Scottish track cyclist. She won a bronze medal in the team sprint at the 2026 Commonwealth Games in Glasgow.

== Career ==
Sillcock started her sporting career competing in the 60 metres and 100 metres as a sprinter in athletics, before later transitioning to compete in sprints in cycling.

In December 2025, riding alongside Ellie Stone and Iona Moir she won the Scottish national team sprint title, breaking the Scottish record.

Three and a half-years after she had started cycling, she was selected as part of the Scotland team for the 2026 Commonwealth Games having won a bronze medal at the British National Track Cycling Championships. Competing at the Games on 30 July 2026, Sillcock won the bronze medal in the team sprint alongside Moir and Lauren Bell, with the team defeating Australia in the bronze medal race.

== Personal life ==
From Aberdeenshire, Sillcock works as a senior physiotherapist for the NHS in Clydebank.
