= Kimberly Kalee =

Dutch cyclist (born 1998)

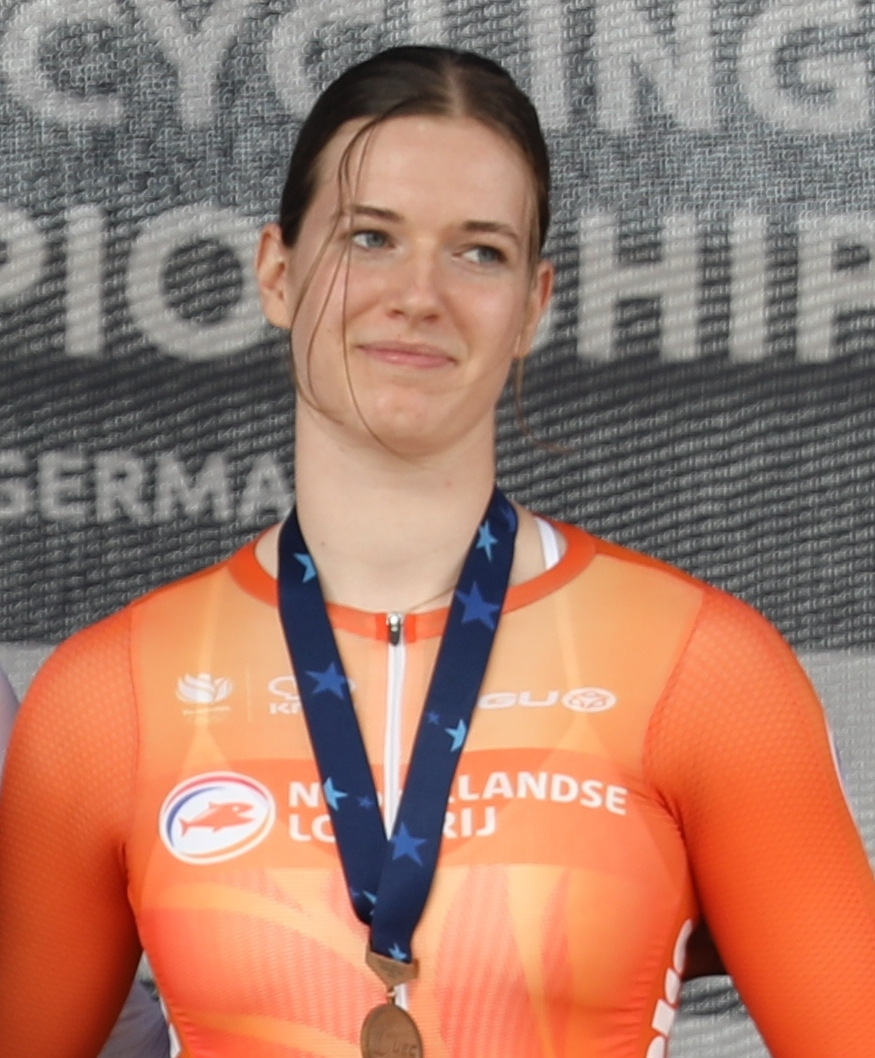
- Kalee in 2024

Personal information
- Born: 7 March 2002 (age 24) Almere, Netherlands

Cycling career
- Sport: Cycling
- Discipline: Track cycling
- Rider type: Sprinter
Medal record
Women's track cycling
Representing the Netherlands
World Championships
Gold medal – first place	2025 Santiago	Team sprint
Silver medal – second place	2024 Ballerup	Team sprint
European Championships
Gold medal – first place	2025 Heusden-Zolder	Team sprint
Bronze medal – third place	2026 Konya	Team sprint
U23 & Junior European Championships
Bronze medal – third place	2023 Anadia	500 m time trial

Kimberly Kalee (born 7 March 2002) is a Dutch female track cyclist, representing Netherlands at international competitions. She is notably a gold medalist at the Track World Championships in team sprint in 2025.

== Career ==
Kalee was a gymnast when she was young. In 2016, she registered for the Talent Day in Almere to discover other sports. During a test on a Wattbike, Kalee's results allowed her to be invited to the national training center in Papendal, where she finally joined the track cycling section in 2018. In her first season, she won her first gold medal in the 500 meters at the national championships in Apeldoorn, in her age category.

In 2022, at the age of 20, Kalee became the Dutch champion in the 500 meters and came second in the sprint. In 2023, she won the national title in both disciplines. At the European U23 Championships (under 23) in 2024, she won the bronze medal in the 500 meters. In October, she made her debut at the Track World Championships and won the silver with Hetty van de Wouw, Steffie van der Peet and Kyra Lamberink.
