= Alina Lysenko =

Russian cyclist (born 2003)

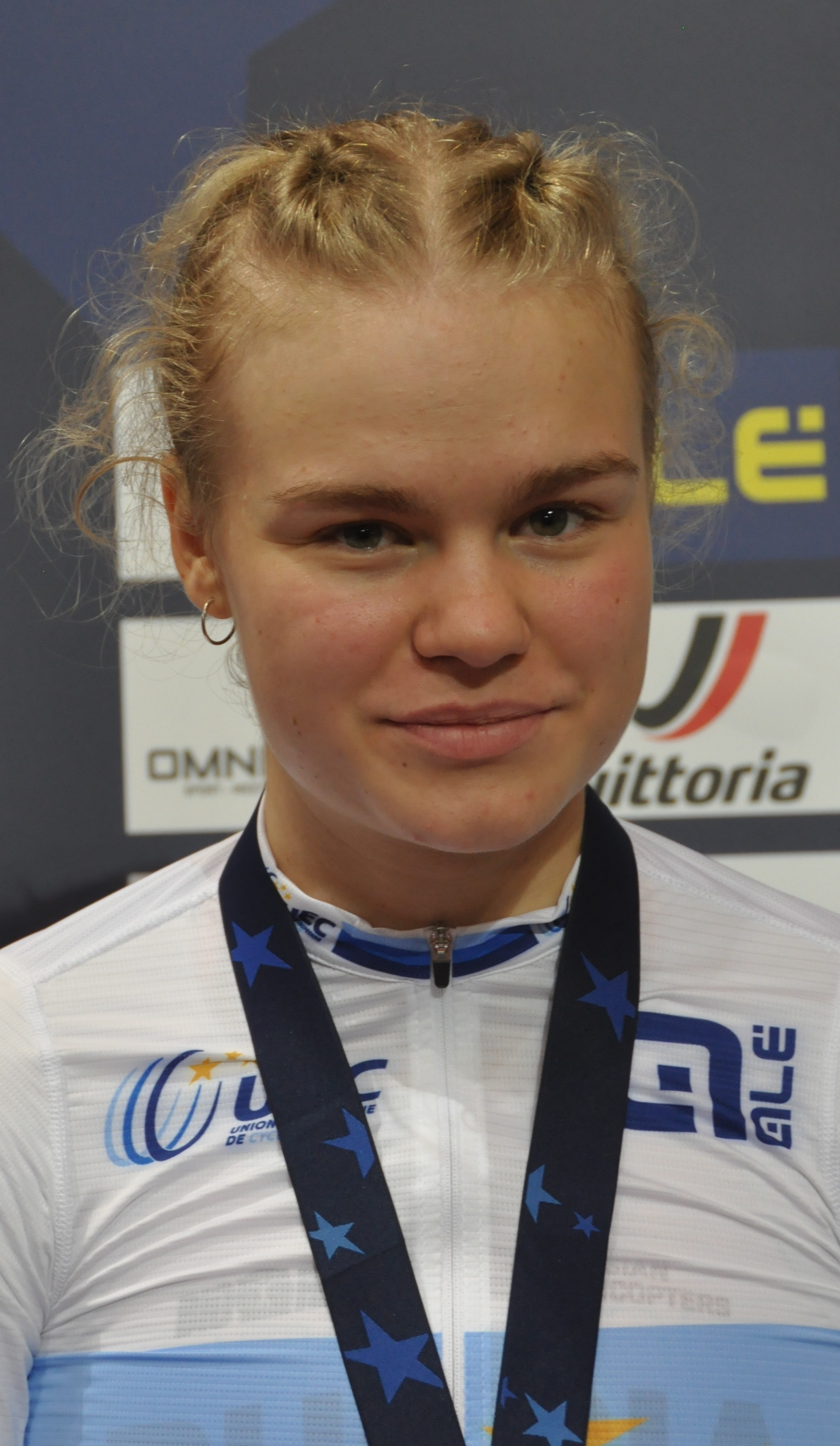
- Lysenko in 2021

Personal information
- Born: 17 May 2003 (age 23)

Cycling career
- Sport: Cycling
- Discipline: Track
- Role: Rider
- Rider type: Sprinter
Medal record
Women's track cycling
Representing Individual Neutral Athletes
World Championships
Gold medal – first place	2026 Shanghai	Keirin
Bronze medal – third place	2025 Santiago	Sprint
European Championships
Gold medal – first place	2026 Konya	Keirin
Bronze medal – third place	2025 Heusden-Zolder	Sprint
Bronze medal – third place	2026 Konya	Sprint
European Under-23 Championships
Gold medal – first place	2025 Anadia	1 km time trial
Gold medal – first place	2025 Anadia	Keirin
Silver medal – second place	2025 Anadia	Individual sprint
Representing Russia
World Junior Championships
Gold medal – first place	2021 Cairo	Sprint
Gold medal – first place	2021 Cairo	Keirin
Gold medal – first place	2021 Cairo	Team Sprint
Gold medal – first place	2021 Cairo	Time Trial

Alina Aleksandrovna Lysenko (Russian: Алина Александровна Лысенко; born 17 May 2003) is a Russian cyclist. She won the gold medal in the keirin at the 2026 UCI Track Cycling World Championships and 2026 UEC European Track Championships, and the sprint title at the 2024 UCI Track Champions League.

She was a bronze medalist in the women's sprint at the 2025 World Championships and 2025 and 2026 European Championships.

== Career ==
Initially a figure skater, she took up cycling at the age of 16 years-old. In 2019, she became the Russian junior champion over 200 meters. A successful junior track cyclist, she won the Sprint and the Kierin gold medals at the 2020 UEC Junior European Track Championships in Fiorenzuola d'Arda, Italy in October 2020.

She won four gold medals at the 2021 UCI Junior Track Cycling World Championships in Cairo, winning the keirin, team and individual sprints titles and the time trial. At the 2021 UEC Junior European Track Championships in Apeldoorn, Netherlands she retained her Sprint and Kieron titles, and also won gold medals in the Team Sprint and 500 metres. She was runner-up to Martha Bayona in the sprint event in the St Petersburg leg of the 2021 UCI Track Cycling Nations Cup.

She became the senior Russian Individual Sprint Champion in 2022. However, her progress was halted internationally that year due to the ban on Russian athletes racing internationally, following Russia's invasion of Ukraine. She made her international return in 2024 as an authorized neutral athlete. She competed in the Nations Cup in Hong Kong in March 2024, where she placed third in the Keirin behind Emma Finucane and Emma Hinze.

She won the sprint title at the 2024 UCI Track Champions League. In the process, she became the first rider in the history of the event to win five consecutive events.

Lysenko was a bronze medalist at the 2025 UEC European Track Championships in the women's sprint in Belgium in February 2025. In October, she was also a bronze medalist at the 2025 UCI Track Cycling World Championships in Santiago, Chile, in the women's sprint.

She won the bronze medal competing at the 2026 UEC European Track Championships in Konya, Turkey in the women's sprint, losing to Emma Finucane in the semi-final but defeating Lea Sophie Friedrich in the bronze medal race. She later won the kierin gold medal at the championships. In October, she won the gold medal at the 2026 UCI Track Cycling World Championships in Shanghai in the women's keirin, outsprinting Finucane and Friedrich in a photo finish.
