= Iona Moir =

British track cyclist

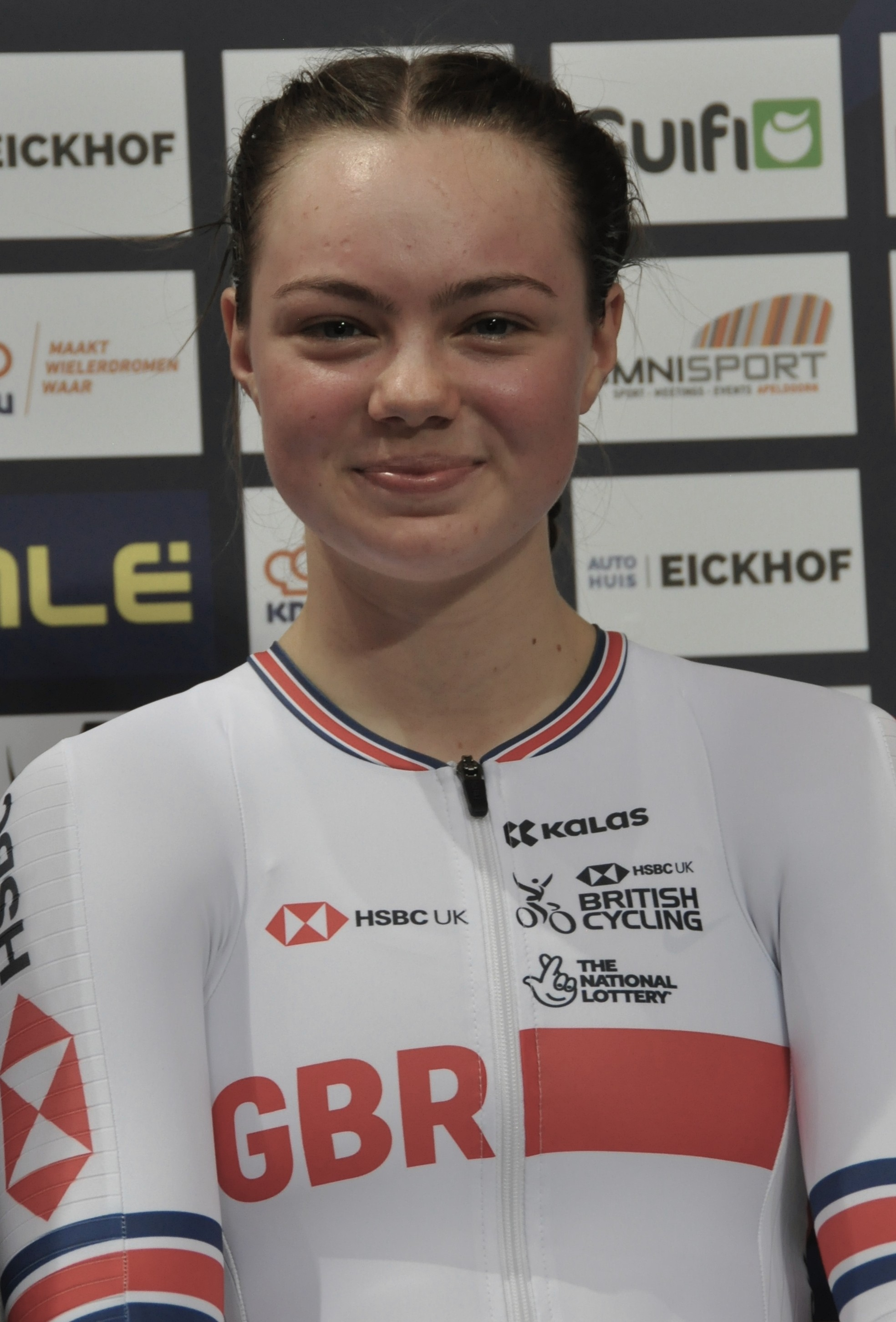
- Moir in 2021

Personal information
- Full name: Margaret Iona Moir
- Born: 5 October 2003 (age 23)

Cycling career
- Sport: Cycling
- Discipline: Track
- Role: Rider
- Rider type: Sprinter
Medal record
Women's track cycling
Representing Great Britain
World Championships
Silver medal – second place	2025 Santiago	Team sprint
U23 & Junior European Championships
Gold medal – first place	2023 Anadia	Team sprint
Gold medal – first place	2024 Cottbus	Team sprint
Gold medal – first place	2025 Anadia	Sprint
Silver medal – second place	2025 Anadia	Team sprint
Silver medal – second place	2024 Cottbus	Keirin
Bronze medal – third place	2025 Anadia	Keirin
Representing Scotland
Commonwealth Games
Bronze medal – third place	2026 Glasgow	Team sprint

Iona Margaret Moir (born 5 October 2003) is a Scottish track cyclist. She was a silver medalist for Great Britain at the 2025 UCI Track Cycling World Championships in the women's team sprint and a bronze medalist competing for Scotland at the 2026 Commonwealth Games.

== Career ==
A member of UK Sport’s National Lottery-funded World Class Programme, Moir competed for Scotland at the 2022 Commonwealth Games in Birmingham, placing ninth in the women's 500m time trial final, and also competed in the women's team sprint, the keirin, and individual sprint. Her performances at the Games included setting a new Scottish record alongside Lauren Bell and Lusia Steele in the team sprint.

She was a gold medalist in the team sprint at the 2023 UEC European Track U23 Championships in Anadia, Portugal. Retaining the team sprint title with the British team in 2024 in Cottbus, Germany, she also won the silver medal at the Championships in the Kierin.

She made her senior debut as she competed in the kilo time trial at the 2025 UEC European Track Championships in Heusden-Zolder, Belgium, in February 2025, placing eighteenth overall. She won the women's U23 European individual sprint title as well as a silver medal in the team sprint and a bronze in the keirin at the 2025 U23 UEC European Track Championships in July 2025.

In October 2025, Moir won a silver medal at the 2025 UCI Track Cycling World Championships in Santiago, Chile, competing in the P2 position for the British team in the women's team sprint alongside Emma Finucane (P3) and Rhianna Parris-Smith (P1). In December 2025, riding alongside Ellie Stone and Maddy Silcock she won the Scottish national team sprint title, breaking the Scottish record.

Competing at the 2026 Commonwealth Games in Glasgow on 30 July 2026, Moir won the bronze medal in the team sprint alongside Sillcock and Lauren Bell, with the team defeating Australia in the bronze medal race.

== Major results ==
2023
2023 UEC European Track Championships (under-23 & junior)

1st Team sprint (with Rhianna Parris-Smith and Rhian Edmunds)

2024
2024 UEC European Track Championships (under-23 & junior)

1st Team sprint (with Rhianna Parris-Smith and Rhian Edmunds)
2nd Keirin

2025
UEC European Track Championships (under-23)

1st Individual Sprint
2nd Team sprint with (Rhian Edmunds and Georgette Rand)
3rd Keirin

UCI Track Cycling World Championships

2nd Team Sprint (with Emma Finucane and Rhianna Parris-Smith)

2026
Commonwealth Games

3rd Team sprint (with Lauren Bell and Maddy Silcock)
