= Rhian Edmunds =

British cyclist

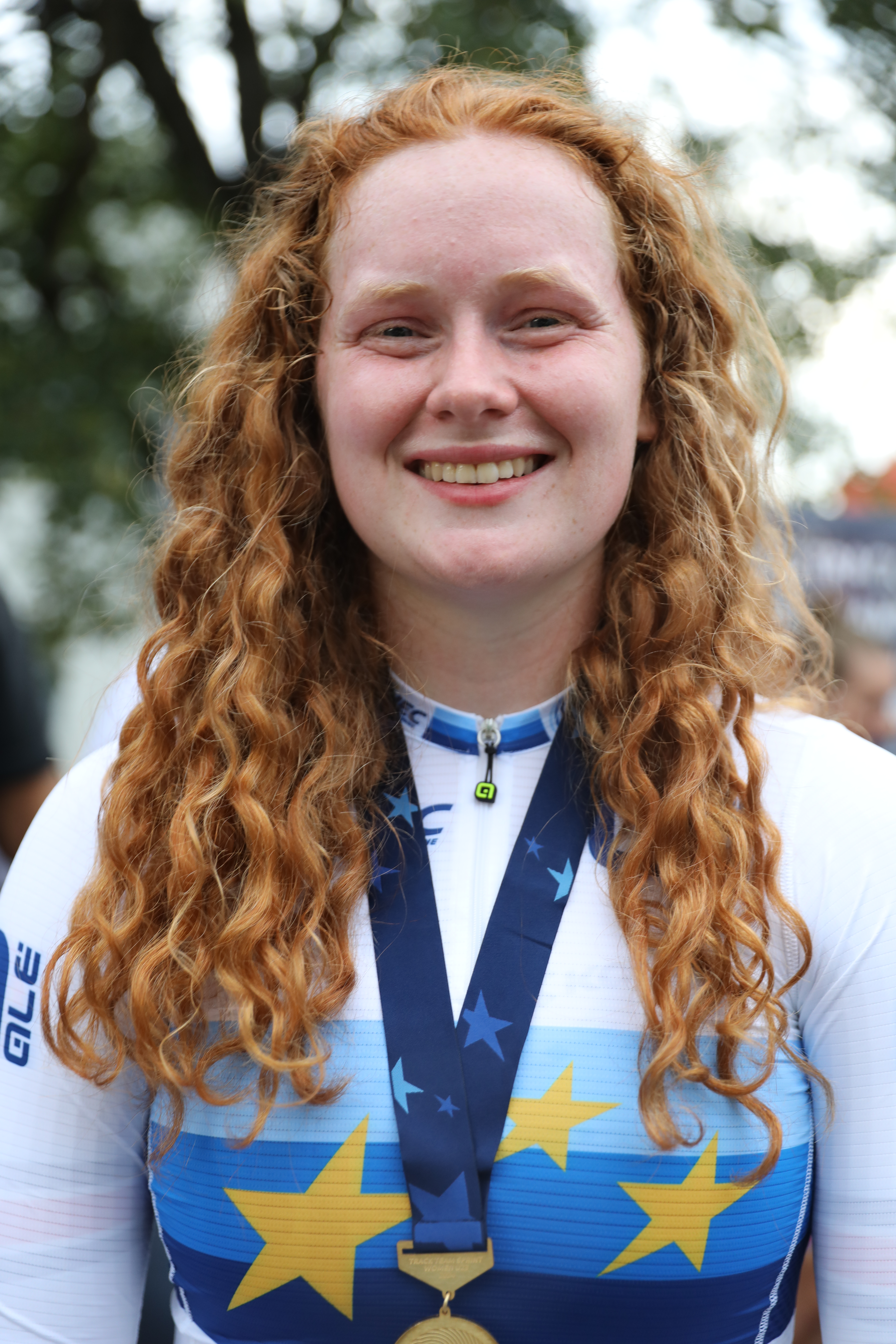
- Edmunds in 2024

Personal information
- Born: 4 April 2003 (age 23) Newport, Wales

Cycling career
- Sport: Cycling
- Current team: Newport Velo Youth CC
- Discipline: Track cycling
- Role: Rider
- Rider type: sprint, team sprint
Medal record
Women's track cycling
Representing Wales
Commonwealth Games
Gold medal – first place	2026 Glasgow	Team sprint
Bronze medal – third place	2022 Birmingham	Team sprint
Bronze medal – third place	2026 Glasgow	Sprint
Representing Great Britain
European Championships
Silver medal – second place	2025 Heusden-Zolder	Sprint
Silver medal – second place	2025 Heusden-Zolder	Keirin
Silver medal – second place	2025 Heusden-Zolder	Team sprint
European Under-23 Championships
Silver medal – second place	2025 Anadia	Team sprint
Silver medal – second place	2025 Anadia	1 km time trial
Silver medal – second place	2025 Anadia	Keirin
Bronze medal – third place	2025 Anadia	Individual sprint

Rhian Edmunds (born 4 April 2003) is a British and Welsh track cyclist. She was a bronze medalist representing Wales in the team sprint at the 2022 Commonwealth Games. She was a three-time silver medalist representing Great Britain at the 2025 UEC European Track Championships, winning the medals in the team sprint, individual sprint and the kierin.

== Cycling career ==
Edmunds became a double British champion when winning the sprint and team sprint events at the 2022 British National Track Championships. Later that year, she claimed a bronze medal representing Wales in the team sprint at the 2022 Commonwealth Games in Birmingham, England, racing alongside Emma Finucane and Lowri Thomas.

She competed on the track at the U23 European Track Championships in Portugal, winning the gold medal in the U23 Team Sprint.

She finished as runner-up in the women’s kierin to Lauren Bell at the 2024 British Cycling National Track Championships, in Manchester.

At the 2025 UCI Track Cycling Nations Cup, Edmunds was part of the British team sprint line-up that finished the event with a silver medal. She was runner-up to Bell in the individual sprint at the 2025 British Cycling National Track Championships. She competed for Great Britain at the 2025 UEC European Track Championships in Heusden-Zolder, Belgium, winning a silver medal in the women’s kierin event, pipped to gold by nine-thousandths of a second by Dutch racer Steffie van der Peet. She also won a silver medal at the championships in the women’s individual sprint competition, edged out in the final by Yana Burlakova. Partnering with Lauren Bell and Rhianna Parris-Smith, she was also a silver medalist in the women's team sprint, finishing runners-up to the Netherlands team.

At the 2026 Commonwealth Games, Edmunds won gold in the team sprint alongside Finucane and Thomas. The Welsh trio twice broke the Commonwealth Games record, recording a time of 46.760 in the final to defeat England. One day later, she won a bronze medal in the sprint.

== Major results ==
2022
National Track Championships

1st Sprint
1st Team sprint

UCI Track Cycling Nations Cup

3rd Team sprint, Glasgow (with Emma Finucane and Lowri Thomas)

Commonwealth Games

3rd Team sprint (with Emma Finucane and Lowri Thomas)

2025
UEC European Track Championships

2nd Sprint
2nd Team sprint (with Lauren Bell and Rhianna Parris-Smith)
2nd Keirin

UCI Track Cycling Nations Cup

2nd Team sprint (with Lowri Thomas and Lauren Bell), Konya

2026
Commonwealth Games

1st Team sprint (with Lowri Thomas and Emma Finucane)
3rd Sprint
