= Lowri Thomas =

British cyclist

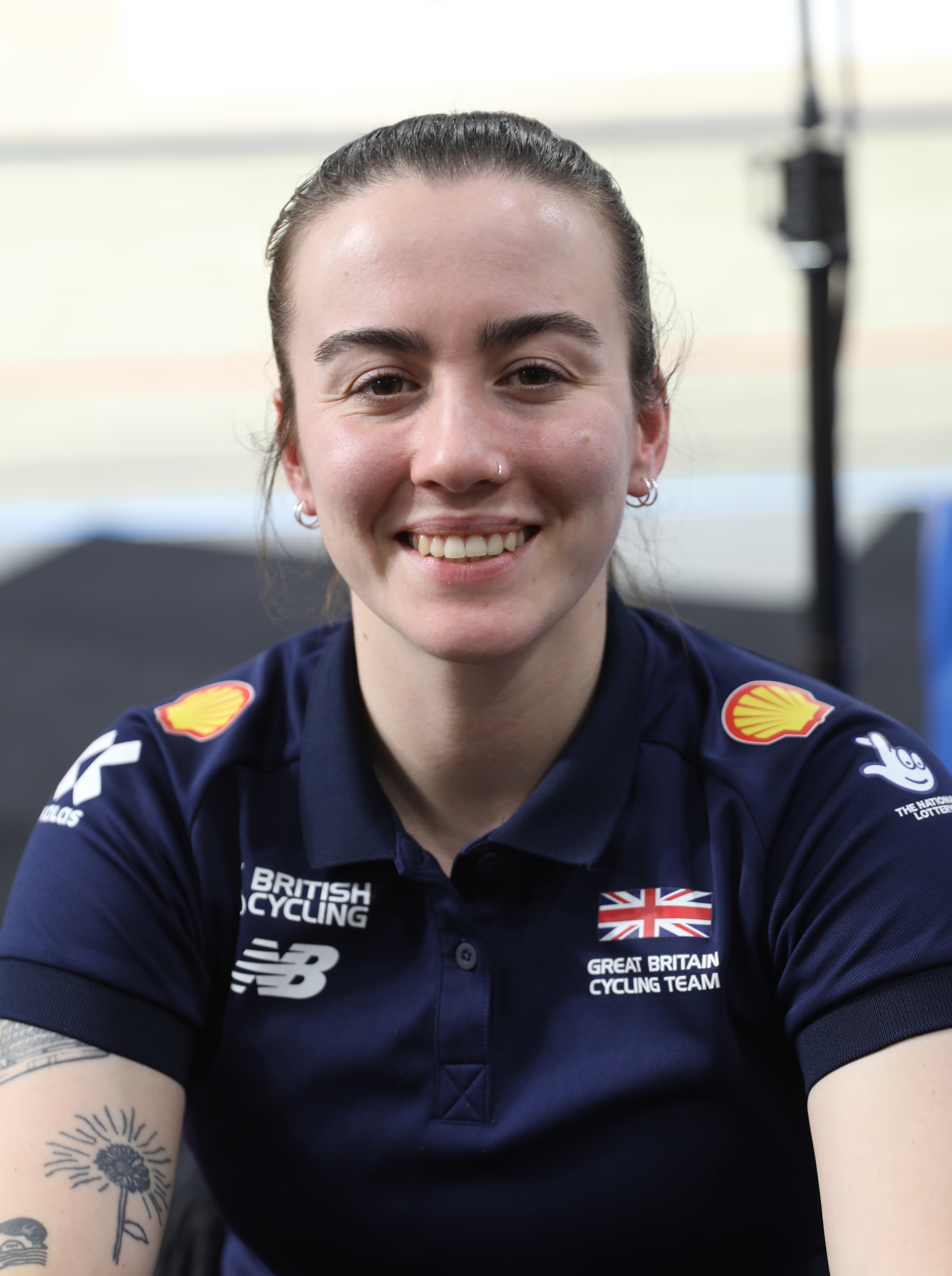
- Thomas in 2024

Personal information
- Born: 3 March 1999 (age 27) Abergavenny, Wales

Cycling career
- Sport: Cycling
- Current team: Team Inspired ~ Team Wales
- Discipline: Track cycling
- Role: Rider
- Rider type: Sprinter
Medal record
Women's track cycling
Representing Great Britain
European Championships
Silver medal – second place	2024 Apeldoorn	Team sprint
Silver medal – second place	2026 Konya	Team sprint
UCI Nations Cup
Silver medal – second place	2025 Konya	Team sprint
Representing Wales
Commonwealth Games
Gold medal – first place	2026 Glasgow	Team sprint
Bronze medal – third place	2022 Birmingham	Team sprint
UCI Nations Cup
Bronze medal – third place	2022 Glasgow	Team sprint

Lowri Thomas (born 3 March 1999) is a British and Welsh track cyclist. She is a Commonwealth Games gold medallist and a two-time UEC European Track Championships silver medallist in the team sprint.

== Cycling career ==
Thomas became a British Champion when winning the team sprint event at the 2022 British National Track Championships alongside teammates Emma Finucane and Rhian Edmunds. In April 2022, Thomas, Finucane and Edmunds once again combined to win a bronze medal in the team sprint in round one of the 2022 UCI Nations Cup in Glasgow, setting a new British record in the process. The trio then went on to win bronze in the team sprint at the 2022 Commonwealth Games. The Welsh team defeated Australia in the Bronze medal ride off, to take third spot on the podium behind New Zealand and Canada.

Having been selected as the travelling reserve for the 2024 Summer Olympics winning team sprint team, she was also selected as travelling reserve for the elite world championships at the 2024 UCI Track Cycling World Championships in Denmark.

At the 2025 UCI Track Cycling Nations Cup in Konya, Thomas was part of the British team sprint line-up that finished the event with a silver medal.

At the 2026 European Championships in Konya, Thomas was a member of the British trio who were defeated by Germany in the final of the team sprint.

At the 2026 Commonwealth Games in Glasgow, Thomas won gold in the team sprint with Edmunds and Finucane. The Welsh trio twice broke the Commonwealth Games record, recording a time of 46.760 in the final to defeat England. Later at the Games, Thomas qualified for the keirin final and placed sixth.

== Major results ==
2026
UEC European Track Championships

2nd Team sprint (Sophie Capewell, Lauren Bell and Rhianna Parris-Smith)

2026 Commonwealth Games

1st Team sprint (with Emma Finucane and Rhian Edmunds)

National Track Championships

1st Team sprint (with Emma Finucane, Lauren Bell and Rhianna Parris-Smith)

2025
National Track Championships

1st Team sprint (with Lauren Bell and Rhian Edmunds)

UCI Nations Cup

2nd Team sprint, Konya (with Lauren Bell and Rhian Edmunds)

2024
UEC European Track Championships

2nd Team sprint (with Sophie Capewell, Emma Finucane and Katy Marchant)

2023
National Track Championships

2nd Team sprint (with Sophie Capewell and Blaine Ridge-Davis)

2022
National Track Championships

1st Team sprint (with Emma Finucane and Rhian Edmunds)

UCI Nations Cup

3rd Team sprint, Glasgow (with Emma Finucane and Rhian Edmunds)

Commonwealth Games

3rd Team sprint (with Emma Finucane and Rhian Edmunds)
