= Clara Schneider =

German cyclist

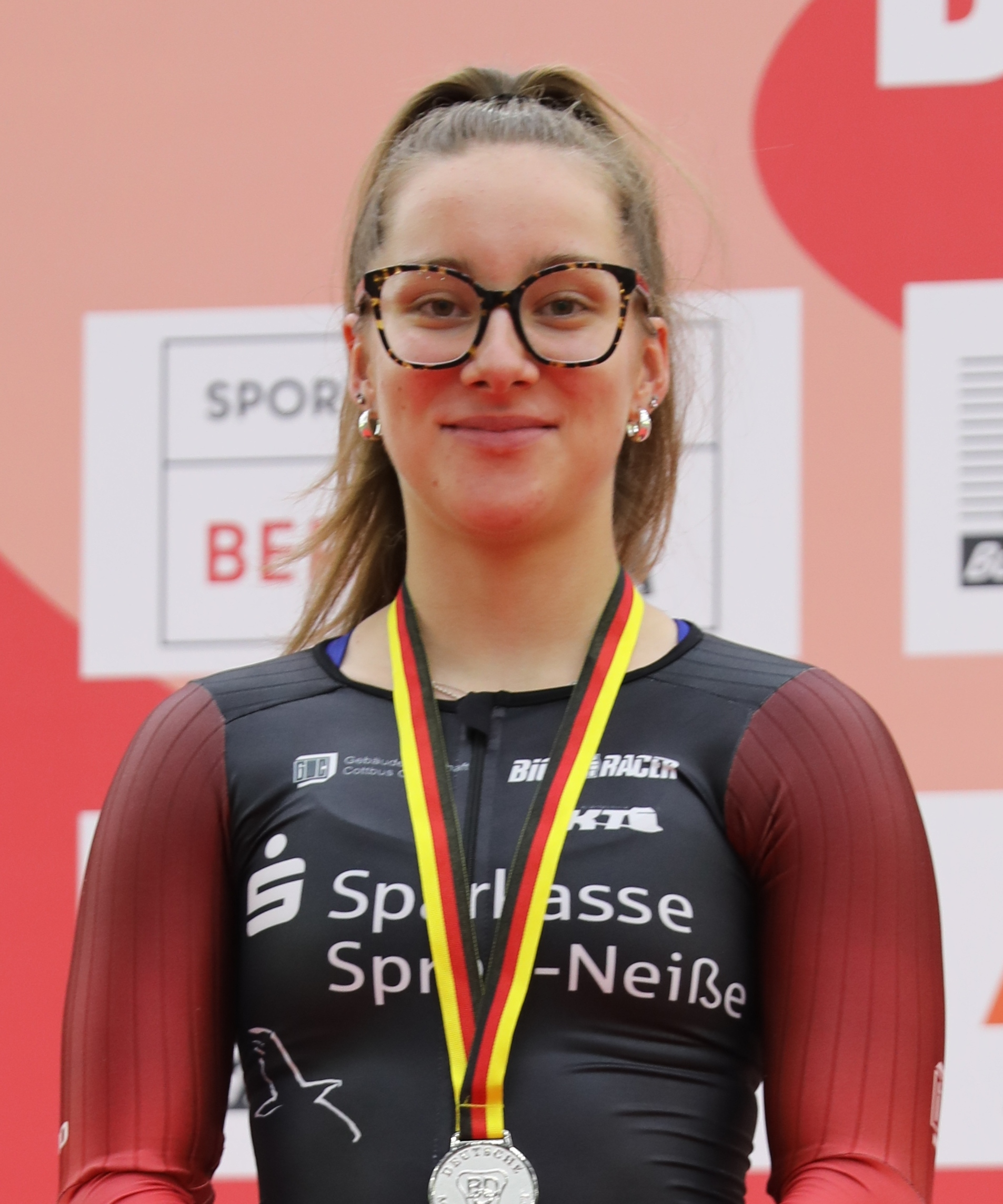
- Schneider in 2024

Personal information
- Nationality: German
- Born: 2 August 2004 (age 22)

Sport
- Country: German
- Sport: Cycling
- Event: Sprint
Medal record
Women's track cycling
Representing Germany
World Championships
Bronze medal – third place	2026 Shanghai	Team sprint
European Championships
Gold medal – first place	2026 Konya	Team sprint
Bronze medal – third place	2025 Heusden-Zolder	1 km time trial
Bronze medal – third place	2025 Heusden-Zolder	Team sprint
European Under-23 Championships
Bronze medal – third place	2025 Anadia	1 km time trial

Clara Schneider (born 2 August 2004) is a German track cyclist. She was a bronze medalist in the team sprint at the 2026 UCI Track Cycling World Championships and a gold medalist at the 2026 UEC European Track Championships.

== Career ==
From Brandenburg, she is a member of Track Team Brandenburg. She won three gold medals; in the sprint, team sprint and keirin, and a silver in the 500 metres time trial, at the 2022 UCI Junior Track Cycling World Championships in Tel Aviv.

Alongside Lara-Sophie Jäger and Stella Müller, she took second place in the team sprint at the European U23 Track Championships in Cottbus, in 2024. She also won the Keirin at the Championships, defending the tile she first won in Portugal at the 2023 U23 Europeans. She also won a silver medal in the 500 metres time trial.

She won a bronze medal in the women's team sprint at the 2025 UEC European Track Championships alongside Lea Friedrich and Pauline Grabosch, in Belgium, in February 2025. The same trio won the gold medal at the 2026 UEC European Track Championships in Turkey, and the bronze medal at the 2026 World Track Championships in China.
