= Alessa-Catriona Pröpster =

German cyclist (born 2001)

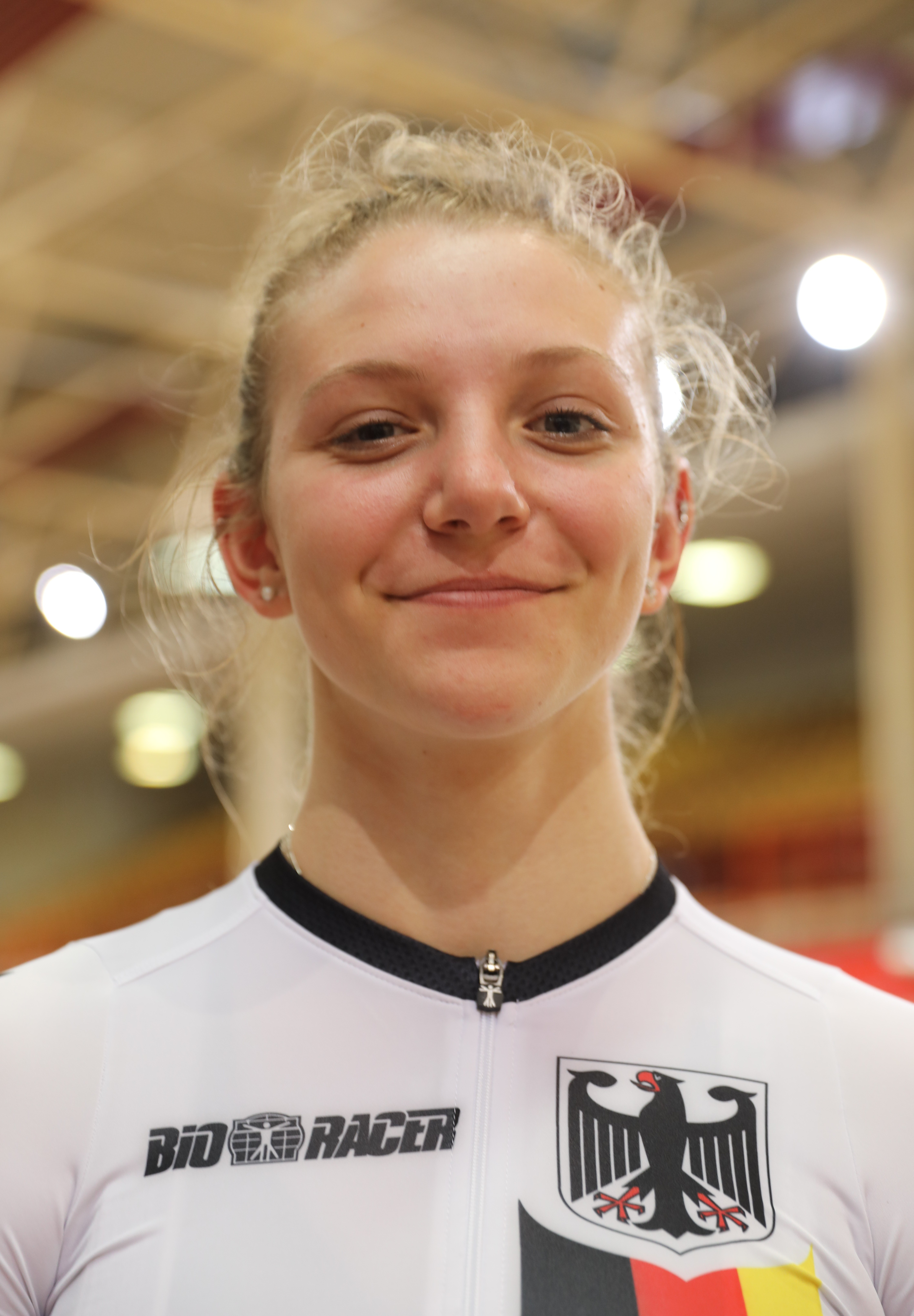
- Pröpster in 2019

Personal information
- Born: 4 March 2001 (age 25)

Cycling career
- Sport: Cycling
- Discipline: Track
- Role: Rider
Medal record
Women's track cycling
Representing Germany
European Championships
Gold medal – first place	2023 Grenchen	Team sprint
Silver medal – second place	2021 Grenchen	Team sprint

Alessa-Catriona Pröpster (born 4 March 2001) is a German professional track cyclist. In October 2021, she won the silver medal in the women's team sprint event at the 2021 UEC European Track Championships.
