= Lea Friedrich =

German cyclist (born 2000)

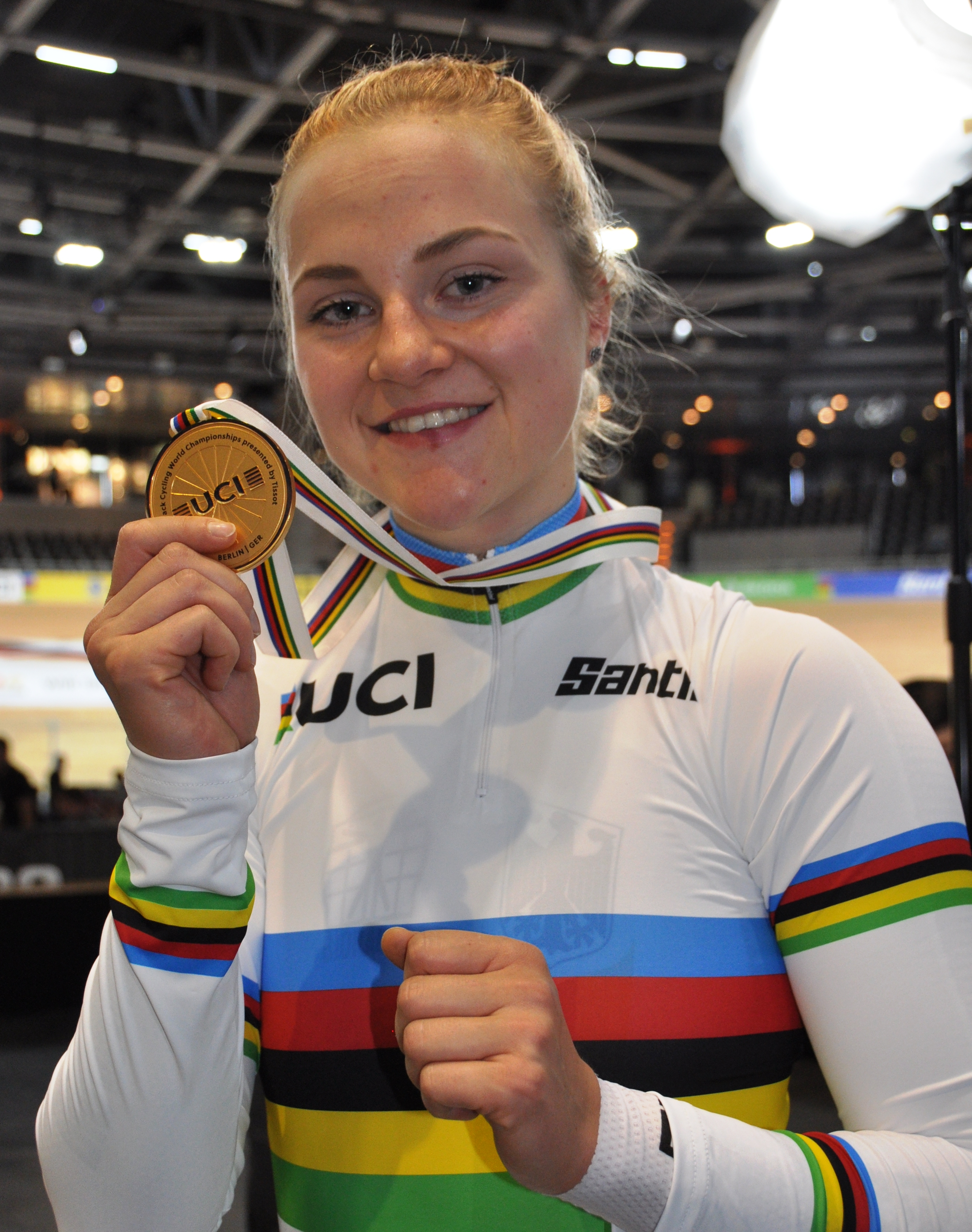
- Friedrich in 2020 - world champion team sprint

Personal information
- Full name: Lea Sophie Friedrich
- Born: 7 January 2000 (age 26) Dassow, Mecklenburg-Vorpommern, Germany
- Height: 1.77 m (5 ft 10 in)
- Weight: 73 kg (161 lb)

Cycling career
- Sport: Cycling
- Discipline: Track
- Role: Rider
Medal record
Women's track cycling
Representing Germany
Olympic Games
Silver medal – second place	2020 Tokyo	Team sprint
Silver medal – second place	2024 Paris	Sprint
Bronze medal – third place	2024 Paris	Team sprint
World Championships
Gold medal – first place	2020 Berlin	500 m time trial
Gold medal – first place	2020 Berlin	Team sprint
Gold medal – first place	2021 Roubaix	500 m time trial
Gold medal – first place	2021 Roubaix	Keirin
Gold medal – first place	2021 Roubaix	Team sprint
Gold medal – first place	2022 Saint-Quentin-en-Yvelines	Keirin
Gold medal – first place	2022 Saint-Quentin-en-Yvelines	Team sprint
Gold medal – first place	2023 Glasgow	Team sprint
Silver medal – second place	2021 Roubaix	Sprint
Silver medal – second place	2022 Saint-Quentin-en-Yvelines	Sprint
Silver medal – second place	2023 Glasgow	Sprint
Silver medal – second place	2026 Shanghai	Keirin
Bronze medal – third place	2023 Glasgow	500 m time trial
Bronze medal – third place	2023 Glasgow	Keirin
Bronze medal – third place	2026 Shanghai	Team sprint
European Championships
Gold medal – first place	2021 Grenchen	Keirin
Gold medal – first place	2022 Munich	Keirin
Gold medal – first place	2022 Munich	Team sprint
Gold medal – first place	2023 Grenchen	Sprint
Gold medal – first place	2023 Grenchen	Keirin
Gold medal – first place	2023 Grenchen	Team sprint
Gold medal – first place	2024 Apeldoorn	Keirin
Gold medal – first place	2024 Apeldoorn	Team sprint
Gold medal – first place	2026 Konya	Team sprint
Silver medal – second place	2019 Apeldoorn	Keirin
Silver medal – second place	2019 Apeldoorn	Team sprint
Silver medal – second place	2021 Grenchen	Sprint
Silver medal – second place	2021 Grenchen	Team sprint
Silver medal – second place	2024 Apeldoorn	Sprint
Bronze medal – third place	2019 Apeldoorn	Sprint
Bronze medal – third place	2025 Heusden-Zolder	Team sprint
Bronze medal – third place	2026 Konya	Keirin

Lea Sophie Friedrich (born 7 January 2000) is a German professional track cyclist. In October 2019, she won the silver medal in the women's team sprint event at the 2019 UEC European Track Championships.

== Major results ==
2017
National Junior Track Cycling Championships

1st 500m Time Trial
1st Keirin
1st Individual Sprint
2nd Team Sprint

UCI Junior Track Cycling World Championships

2nd 500m Time Trial
2nd Team Sprint
3rd Individual Sprint

European Junior Track Cycling Championships

2nd Team Sprint
2nd Individual Sprint
2nd 500m Time Trial

2018
UCI Junior Track Cycling World Championships

1st 500m Time Trial
1st Keirin
2nd Team Sprint
3rd Individual Sprint

1st Team Sprint, National Track Cycling Championships
National Junior Track Cycling Championships

1st 500m Time Trial
1st Keirin
1st Individual Sprint
1st Team Sprint

2019
European U23 Track Cycling Championships

1st 500m Time Trial
1st Keirin
2nd Individual Sprint

European Track Cycling Championships

2nd Team Sprint
2nd Keirin
3rd Individual Sprint

UCI Track Cycling World Cup

Team Sprint – Minsk
Team Sprint – Glasgow

2020
UCI Track Cycling World Championships

1st 500m Time Trial
1st Team Sprint

European U23 Track Cycling Championships

1st 500m Time Trial
1st Keirin
1st Individual Sprint
1st Team Sprint
