= Lauren Bell (cyclist) =

Scottish cyclist

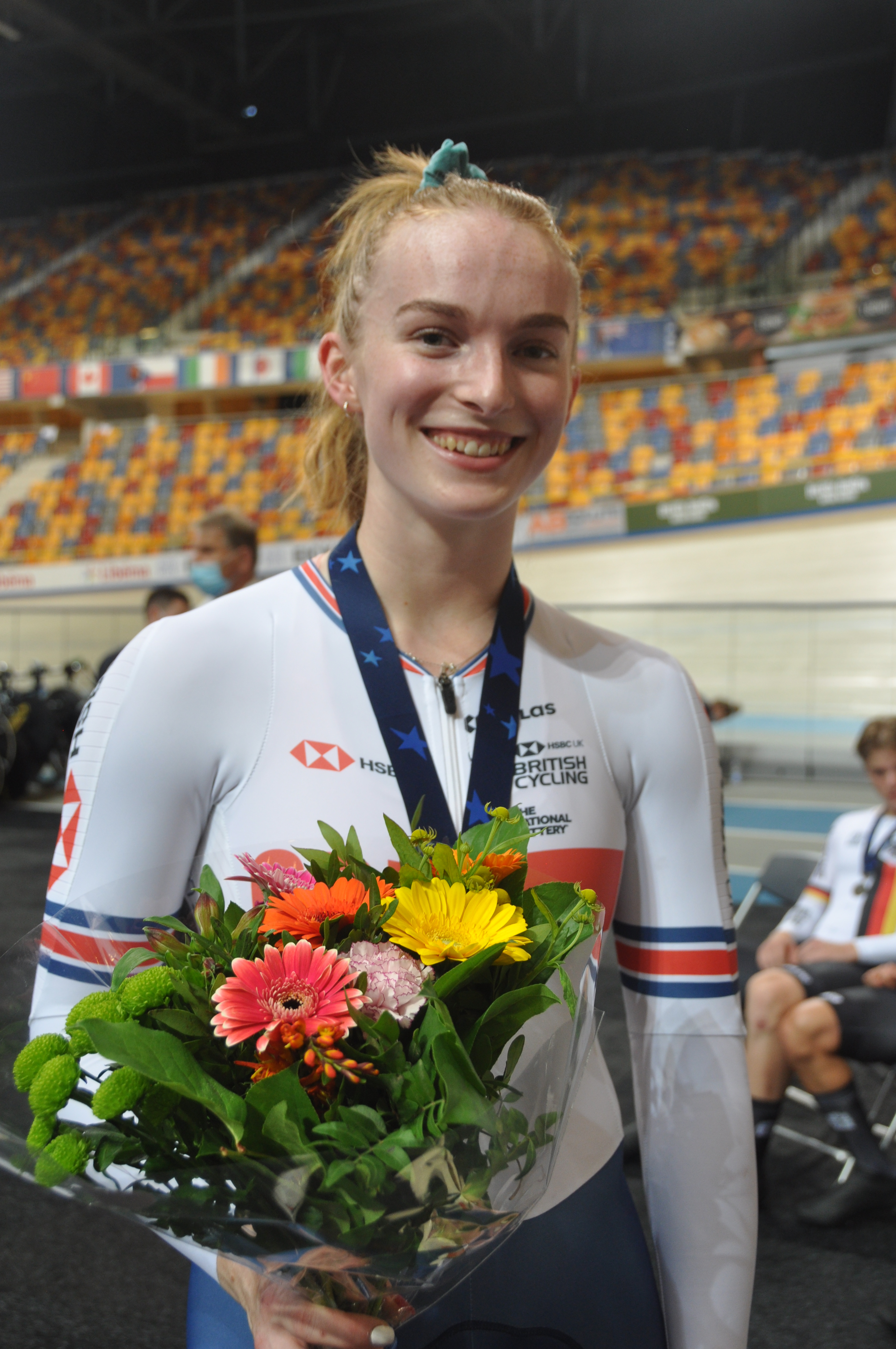
- Bell in 2021

Personal information
- Born: 6 October 1999 (age 27) Scotland

Cycling career
- Sport: Cycling
- Current team: Black Line
- Discipline: Track Sprint
- Role: Rider
- Rider type: Sprinter
Medal record
Women's track cycling
Representing Great Britain
World Championships
Silver medal – second place	2023 Glasgow	Team sprint
Bronze medal – third place	2022 Saint-Quentin-en-Yvelines	Team sprint
European Championships
Silver medal – second place	2023 Grenchen	Team sprint
Silver medal – second place	2025 Heusden-Zolder	Team sprint
Silver medal – second place	2026 Konya	Team sprint
Representing Scotland
Commonwealth Games
Bronze medal – third place	2026 Glasgow	Team sprint

Lauren Bell (born 6 October 1999) is a British and Scottish female track cyclist. She won a bronze medal in the team sprint at the 2022 UCI Track Cycling World Championships and a silver medal in the event at the 2023 UCI Track Cycling World Championships.

== Early life ==
She is from Forres in west Moray, Scotland. She was educated at the Forres Academy. She switched her focus from athletics to cycling in her late teenage years. She studied in Edinburgh, before moving to Manchester to train full-time with British Cycling.

== Cycling career ==
Bell became a double British champion, when winning the time trial Championship and the keirin championship at the 2020 British National Track Championships in Manchester. She set new Scottish records in two events at the championships in which she won four medals overall, achieving the milestones in the 500m time trial and a flying 200m run.

She went on to take her first global medal with a bronze in the team sprint at the 2022 UCI Track Cycling World Championships in Saint-Quentin-en-Yvelines, France, alongside Sophie Capewell and Emma Finucane. She represented Scotland at the 2022 Commonwealth Games in Birmingham, England.

Bell won a silver medal at the 2023 UCI Track Cycling World Championships on the women's team sprint event alongside Finucane and Capewell in Glasgow, Scotland. In the qualifying round they qualified fastest in a new British record time of 46.072. They were narrowly beaten to the gold medal in the final by the German sprint team who set a new world record.

In 2024, she won her third and fourth national titles at the 2024 British Cycling National Track Championships, winning the individual sprint and the kierin titles in Manchester within the space of 24 hours, holding off a late charge from Rhian Edmunds.

At the 2025 UCI Track Cycling Nations Cup in Konya, Bell was part of the British team sprint line-up that finished the event with a silver medal. She won three sprint titles at the 2025 British Cycling National Track Championships.

In the 2026 UCI Track World Cup, Bell won a silver medal in the team sprint at the race in Hong Kong. At the 2026 Commonwealth Games in Glasgow, Bell won bronze for Scotland in the team sprint.

== Major wins ==
2020

National Track Championships

1st Time trial
1st Keirin

2024
National Track Championships

1st Sprint
1st Keirin

2025
UEC European Track Championships

2nd Team sprint (with Rhian Edmunds and Rhianna Parris-Smith)

UCI Track Cycling Nations Cup

2nd Team sprint (with Lowri Thomas and Rhian Edmunds), Konya

2026
2026 UCI Track World Cup

2nd Team sprint (with Rhianna Parris-Smith and Emma Finucane), Hong Kong

Commonwealth Games

3rd Team sprint (with Iona Moir and Maddy Silcock)
