= Steffie van der Peet =

Dutch cyclist (born 1999)

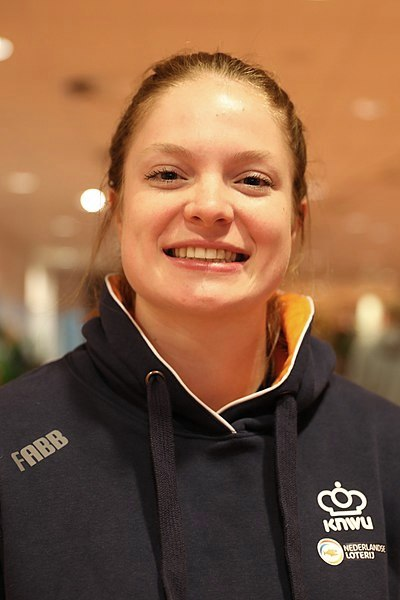
- Steffie van der Peet (2019)

Personal information
- Born: 10 September 1999 (age 27) The Hague, Netherlands

Cycling career
- Sport: Cycling
- Discipline: Track cycling
- Role: Rider
- Rider type: Sprinter
Medal record
Women's track cycling
Representing the Netherlands
World Championships
Gold medal – first place	2025 Santiago	Team sprint
Silver medal – second place	2024 Ballerup	Team sprint
Bronze medal – third place	2022 Saint-Quentin-en-Yvelines	Keirin
European Championships
Gold medal – first place	2021 Grenchen	Team sprint
Gold medal – first place	2025 Heusden-Zolder	Team sprint
Gold medal – first place	2025 Heusden-Zolder	Keirin
Silver medal – second place	2022 Munich	Team sprint
Bronze medal – third place	2019 Apeldoorn	Team sprint
Bronze medal – third place	2023 Grenchen	Team sprint
Bronze medal – third place	2024 Apeldoorn	Team sprint
Bronze medal – third place	2026 Konya	Team sprint

Steffie van der Peet (born 10 September 1999) is a Dutch professional racing cyclist. In October 2019, she won the bronze medal in the women's team sprint event at the 2019 UEC European Track Championships.

== Major results ==
2019
3rd Team sprint, UEC European Championships

2021
1st Team sprint, UEC European Championships

2022
2nd Team sprint, UEC European Championships
3rd Keirin, UCI World Championships

2023
3rd Team sprint, UEC European Championships

2024
2nd Team sprint, UCI World Championships
3rd Team sprint, UEC European Championships

2025
1st Team sprint, UCI World Championships
1st Team sprint, UEC European Championships
1st Keirin, UEC European Championships

2026
3rd Team sprint, UEC European Championships
