= Alla Biletska =

Ukrainian cyclist (born 2003)

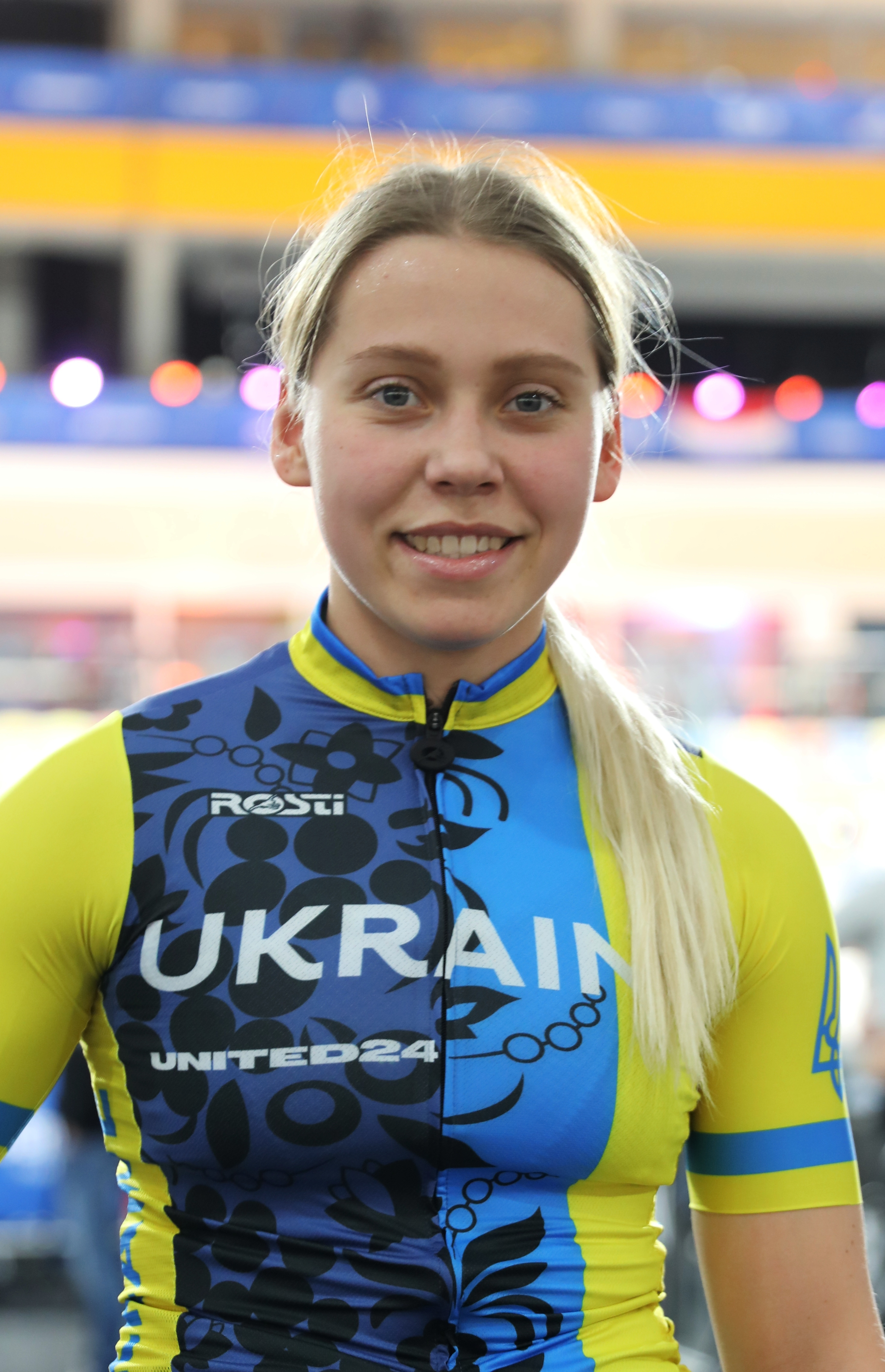
- Alla Biletska in 2024

Personal information
- Born: 19 May 2003 (age 23) Molochansk, Zaporizhzhia Oblast, Ukraine

Cycling career
- Sport: Cycling
- Discipline: Track cycling
- Role: Rider
Medal record
Women's track cycling
Representing Ukraine
World Junior Championships
Silver medal – second place	2021 Cairo	Sprint
Bronze medal – third place	2021 Cairo	Keirin
U23 & Junior European Championships
Silver medal – second place	2020 Fiorenzuola d'Arda	Junior, 500 m time trial
Silver medal – second place	2021 Apeldoorn	Junior, Keirin
Bronze medal – third place	2020 Fiorenzuola d'Arda	Junior, Keirin
Bronze medal – third place	2023 Anadia	Under-23, Keirin

Alla Biletska (born 19 May 2003 in Molochansk) is a Ukrainian track cyclist.

In 2020, Biletska won silver and bronze medals in the 2020 UEC European Track Championships (under-23 & junior).

The following year, she competed in multiple events. She received a silver medal in the UEC European Track Championships (under-23 & junior), as well as silver and bronze medals in the UCI Junior Track Cycling World Championships. She also competed at the UCI Track Cycling World Championships.

Biletska continued competing in 2023. She won bronze medal in the UEC European Track Championships (under-23 & junior) and competed at the UCI Track Champions League. In September, she joined UCI World Cycling Centre’s track group in Aigle, Switzerland.
