= Russia at the 2018 European Championships =

- WA code: RUS

in (United Kingdom) Glasgow (Germany) Berlin 2 August 2018 – 12 August 2018
- Competitors: 172 (97 men and 75 women) in 5 sports.
- Medals Ranked 1st: Gold 31 Silver 19 Bronze 16 Total 66

European Championships appearances
- 2018; 2022

Russia competed at the inaugural seven-sport 2018 European Championships held in Berlin, Germany, and Glasgow, United Kingdom from 2 to 12 August 2018. It competed in five sports with no athletes in the athletics and golf events.

The Aquatics Championships became the country's most successful in the history of the championships in regard to the medal count. The previous record was broken on 9 August 2018, when until then the Russians collected 39 medals, 19 of which were gold medals, 12 silver medals and 8 bronze medals.

Russia topped the medal table at the end of the championships on 12 August 2018 with 31 gold medals and received the European Championships Trophy.

== Medallists ==
Medal	Name	Sport	Event	Date
Gold	Svetlana Kolesnichenko; Varvara Subbotina	Synchronised swimming	Duet technical routine	3 August
Gold	Mayya Gurbanberdieva; Aleksandr Maltsev	Synchronised swimming	Mixed Duet technical routine	3 August
Gold	Danila Izotov; Kliment Kolesnikov; Vladimir Morozov; Evgeny Rylov; Sergey Fesikov*; Vladislav Grinev*; Ivan Kuzmenko*; Andrey Zhilkin*	Swimming	Men's 4 × 100 m freestyle relay	3 August
Gold	Daria Shmeleva; Anastasia Voynova	Cycling	Women's team sprint	3 August
Gold	Elena Oriabinskaia; Ekaterina Potapova; Ekaterina Sevostianova; Anastasia Tikhanova	Rowing	Women's four	4 August
Gold	Anastasia Arkhipovskaya; Anastasia Bayandina; Daria Bayandina; Marina Goliadkina; Veronika Kalinina; Polina Komar; Maria Shurochkina; Darina Valitova; Mikhaela Kalancha	Synchronised swimming	Team free routine	4 August
Gold	Lilia Akhaimova; Irina Alexeeva; Angelina Melnikova; Uliana Perebinosova; Angelina Simakova	Gymnastics	Women's team	4 August
Gold	Kliment Kolesnikov	Swimming	Men's 50m backstroke	4 August
Gold	Yuliya Yefimova	Swimming	Women's 100m breaststroke	5 August
Gold	Daria Shmeleva	Cycling	Women's sprint	5 August
Gold	Svetlana Kolesnichenko	Synchronised swimming	Solo technical routine	6 August
Gold	Anastasia Arkhipovskaya; Anastasia Bayandina; Daria Bayandina; Marina Goliadkina; Mikhaela Kalancha; Veronika Kalinina; Polina Komar; Maria Shurochkina; Darina Valitova	Synchronised swimming	Team technical routine	6 August
Gold	Kliment Kolesnikov	Swimming	Men's 100m backstroke	6 August
Gold	Anton Chupkov	Swimming	Men's 200m breaststroke	6 August
Gold	Daria Shmeleva	Cycling	Women's 500m time trial	6 August
Gold	Svetlana Kolesnichenko; Varvara Subbotina	Synchronised swimming	Duet free routine	7 August
Gold	Mayya Gurbanberdieva; Aleksandr Maltsev	Synchronised swimming	Mixed Duet free routine	7 August
Gold	Svetlana Kolesnichenko	Synchronised swimming	Solo free routine	7 August
Gold	Anastasia Fesikova	Swimming	Women's 100m backstroke	7 August
Gold	Yuliya Yefimova	Swimming	Women's 200m breaststroke	7 August
Gold	Evgeny Rylov	Swimming	Men's 200m backstroke	8 August
Gold	Aleksandr Bondar; Viktor Minibaev	Diving	Men's 10m synchro platform	9 August
Gold	Yuliya Yefimova	Swimming	Women's 50m breaststroke	9 August
Gold	Svetlana Chimrova; Anastasia Fesikova; Maria Kameneva; Yuliya Yefimova; Arina Openysheva*; Vitalina Simonova*; Daria Ustinova*	Swimming	Women's 4 × 100 m medley relay	9 August
Gold	Evgeny Kuznetsov; Ilia Zakharov	Diving	Men's 3m synchro springboard	10 August
Gold	Maria Poliakova	Diving	Women's 1m springboard	10 August
Gold	David Belyavskiy; Artur Dalaloyan; Nikolai Kuksenkov; Dmitriy Lankin; Nikita Nagornyy	Gymnastics	Men's team	11 August
Gold	Nikita Shleikher; Yulia Timoshinina	Diving	Mixed 10m synchro platform	11 August
Gold	Aleksandr Bondar	Diving	Men's 10m platform	12 August
Gold	Artur Dalaloyan	Gymnastics	Men's vault	12 August
Gold	Artur Dalaloyan	Gymnastics	Men's parallel bars	12 August
Silver	Svetlana Chimrova	Swimming	Women's 100m butterfly	4 August
Silver	Viktoriya Andreyeva; Mikhail Dovgalyuk; Valeriya Salamatina; Mikhail Vekovishchev; Viacheslav Andrusenko*; Anastasia Guzhenkova*; Irina Krivonogova*; Martin Malyutin*	Swimming	Mixed 4 × 200 m freestyle relay	4 August
Silver	Angelina Melnikova	Gymnastics	Women's vault	5 August
Silver	Anastasia Fesikova	Swimming	Women's 50m backstroke	5 August
Silver	Mikhail Dovgalyuk; Danila Izotov; Martin Malyutin; Mikhail Vekovishchev; Viacheslav Andrusenko*	Swimming	Men's 4 × 200 m freestyle relay	5 August
Silver	Anastasia Voynova	Cycling	Women's sprint	5 August
Silver	Svetlana Chimrova	Swimming	Women's 200m butterfly	6 August
Silver	Evgeny Rylov	Swimming	Men's 100m backstroke	6 August
Silver	Svetlana Chimrova; Kliment Kolesnikov; Vladimir Morozov; Yuliya Yefimova; Viktoriya Andreeva*; Maria Kameneva*; Ilya Khomenko*; Grigoriy Tarasevich*	Swimming	Mixed 4 × 100 m medley relay	6 August
Silver	Gulnaz Badykova; Diana Klimova	Cycling	Women's madison	7 August
Silver	Ekaterina Beliaeva; Yulia Timoshinina	Diving	Women's 10m synchro platform	7 August
Silver	Anna Egorova; Anastasia Guzhenkova; Arina Openysheva; Valeriya Salamatina; Irina Krivonogova*	Swimming	Women's 4 × 200 m freestyle relay	7 August
Silver	Ilia Zakharov	Diving	Men's 3m springboard	9 August
Silver	Daria Ustinova	Swimming	Women's 200m backstroke	9 August
Silver	Anton Chupkov; Kliment Kolesnikov; Egor Kuimov; Vladimir Morozov; Vladislav Grinev*; Kirill Prigoda*; Evgeny Rylov*; Aleksandr Sadovnikov*	Swimming	Men's 4 × 100 m medley relay	9 August
Silver	Nadezhda Bazhina	Diving	Women's 1m springboard	10 August
Silver	Kirill Belyaev	Swimming	Men's 25 km open water	12 August
Silver	Nikita Shleikher	Diving	Men's 10m platform	12 August
Silver	David Belyavskiy	Gymnastics	Men's parallel bars	12 August
Bronze	Gulnaz Badykova	Cycling	Women's 25km points race	4 August
Bronze	Anna Egorova	Swimming	Women's 800m freestyle	4 August
Bronze	Anton Chupkov	Swimming	Men's 100m breaststroke	4 August
Bronze	Evgenia Augustinas	Cycling	Women's elimination race	5 August
Bronze	Angelina Melnikova	Gymnastics	Women's uneven bars	5 August
Bronze	Evgeny Kuznetsov; Yulia Timoshinina	Diving	Mixed team	6 August
Bronze	Anastasia Guzhenkova	Swimming	Women's 200m freestyle	6 August
Bronze	Daria Shmeleva	Cycling	Women's keirin	7 August
Bronze	Oleg Kostin	Swimming	Men's 50m butterfly	7 August
Bronze	Mikhail Dovgalyuk	Swimming	Men's 200m freestyle	7 August
Bronze	Vladislav Grinev; Maria Kameneva; Kliment Kolesnikov; Arina Openysheva; Danila Izotov*; Rozaliya Nasretdinova*	Swimming	Mixed 4 × 100 m freestyle relay	8 August
Bronze	Evgeny Kuznetsov	Diving	Men's 3m springboard	9 August
Bronze	Yaroslava Bondarenko	Cycling	Women's BMX	11 August
Bronze	Nadezhda Bazhina; Kristina Ilinykh	Diving	Women's 3m synchro springboard	12 August
Bronze	Artur Dalaloyan	Gymnastics	Men's floor	12 August
Bronze	Dmitriy Lankin	Gymnastics	Men's vault	12 August

* Participated in the heats only and received medals.

Medals by sport
Sport	1st place, gold medalist(s)	2nd place, silver medalist(s)	3rd place, bronze medalist(s)	Total
Aquatics	23	15	9	47
Cycling	3	2	4	9
Gymnastics	4	2	3	9
Rowing	1	0	0	1
Total	31	19	16	66

Medals by date
Day	Date	1st place, gold medalist(s)	2nd place, silver medalist(s)	3rd place, bronze medalist(s)	Total
2	3 August	4	0	0	4
3	4 August	4	2	3	9
4	5 August	2	4	2	8
5	6 August	5	3	2	10
6	7 August	5	3	3	11
7	8 August	1	0	1	2
8	9 August	3	3	1	7
9	10 August	2	1	0	3
10	11 August	2	0	1	3
11	12 August	3	3	3	9
Total		31	19	16	66

Medals by gender
Gender	1st place, gold medalist(s)	2nd place, silver medalist(s)	3rd place, bronze medalist(s)	Total
Male	11	7	6	24
Female	17	10	8	35
Mixed events	3	2	2	7
Total	31	19	16	66

== Aquatics ==
=== Diving ===
A total of 12 divers (6 men and 6 women) represented Russia in the diving events.

Men

Athlete	Event	Preliminaries		Final	
Athlete	Event	Points	Rank	Points	Rank
Aleksandr Bondar	Men's 10m platform	459.60	1 Q	542.05	1st place, gold medalist(s)
Evgeny Kuznetsov	Men's 3m springboard	406.70	4 Q	508.05	3rd place, bronze medalist(s)
Egor Lapin	Men's 1m springboard	285.70	19	did not advance	
Nikita Shleikher	Men's 1m springboard	341.90	7 Q	349.15	10
Nikita Shleikher	Men's 10m platform	431.10	5 Q	481.15	2nd place, silver medalist(s)
Ilya Zakharov	Men's 3m springboard	508.10	1 Q	519.05	2nd place, silver medalist(s)
Evgeny Kuznetsov; Ilya Zakharov	Men's 3m synchro springboard	—N/a		431.16	1st place, gold medalist(s)
Aleksandr Bondar; Viktor Minibaev	Men's 10m synchro platform	—N/a		423.12	1st place, gold medalist(s)

Women

Athlete	Event	Preliminaries		Final	
Athlete	Event	Points	Rank	Points	Rank
Nadezhda Bazhina	Women's 1m springboard	263.60	2 Q	276.00	2nd place, silver medalist(s)
Nadezhda Bazhina	Women's 3m springboard	293.40	5 Q	274.20	5
Anna Chuinyshena	Women's 10m platform	180.00	15	did not advance	
Maria Polyakova	Women's 1m springboard	251.85	4 Q	285.55	1st place, gold medalist(s)
Maria Polyakova	Women's 3m springboard	318.65	1 Q	256.45	11
Yulia Timoshinina	Women's 10m platform	204.80	14	did not advance	
Nadezhda Bazhina; Kristina Ilinykh	Women's 3m synchro springboard	—N/a		282.90	3rd place, bronze medalist(s)
Ekaterina Beliaeva; Yulia Timoshinina	Women's 10m synchro platform	—N/a		288.60	2nd place, silver medalist(s)

Mixed

Athlete	Event	Final	
Athlete	Event	Points	Rank
Nadezhda Bazhina; Nikita Shleikher	Mixed 3m synchro springboard	272.40	6
Nikita Shleikher; Yulia Timoshinina	Mixed 10m synchro platform	309.63	1st place, gold medalist(s)
Evgeny Kuznetsov; Yulia Timoshinina	Mixed team	349.55	3rd place, bronze medalist(s)

=== Open water swimming ===
A total of 11 swimmers (6 men and 5 women) represented Russia in the open water swimming events.

Men

Athlete	Event	Time	Rank
Kirill Abromisov	Men's 5 km	53:16.7	15
Kirill Abromisov	Men's 10 km	1:51:20.5	26
Denis Adeev	Men's 5 km	53:09.0	8
Sergey Bolshakov	Men's 5 km	53:18.8	17
Kirill Belyaev	Men's 10 km	1:49:51.6	11
Kirill Belyaev	Men's 25 km	4:57:54.6	2nd place, silver medalist(s)
Evgeny Drattsev	Men's 10 km	1:51:00.5	24
Evgeny Drattsev	Men's 25 km	4:59:42.1	6
Anton Evsikov	Men's 25 km	5:00:13.3	7

Women

Athlete	Event	Time	Rank
Sofia Kolesnikova	Women's 10 km	1:58:41.3	13
Olga Kozydub	Women's 25 km	5:28:29.1	11
Anastasiya Krapyvina	Women's 10 km	2:05:46.9	25
Anastasiya Krapyvina	Women's 25 km	5:24:56.6	8
Daria Kulik	Women's 5 km	59:14.6	17
Daria Kulik	Women's 25 km	5:32:19.8	13
Mariia Novikova	Women's 5 km	57:25.8	9
Mariia Novikova	Women's 10 km	Disqualified	

Mixed

Athlete	Event	Time	Rank
Kirill Abromisov; Denis Adeev; Sofia Kolesnikova; Mariia Novikova	Mixed team 5 km relay	53:49.5	6

=== Swimming ===
A total of 41 swimmers (25 men and 16 women) represented Russia in the swimming events.

Men

Athlete	Event	Heat		Semifinal		Final	
Athlete	Event	Time	Rank	Time	Rank	Time	Rank
Viacheslav Andrusenko	Men's 200m freestyle	1:49.21	16	did not advance			
Viacheslav Andrusenko	Men's 400m freestyle	3:53.02	22	—N/a		did not advance	
Anton Chupkov	Men's 100m breaststroke	59.15	4 q	59.43	3 Q	59.06	3rd place, bronze medalist(s)
Anton Chupkov	Men's 200m breaststroke	2:07.70	1 q	2:07.95	1 Q	2:06.80 ER	1st place, gold medalist(s)
Mikhail Dorinov	Men's 50m breaststroke	28.51	35	did not advance			
Mikhail Dorinov	Men's 200m breaststroke	2:11.29	9	did not advance			
Mikhail Dovgalyuk	Men's 200m freestyle	1:48.24	7 q	1:46.69	3 q	1:46.15	3rd place, bronze medalist(s)
Ilya Druzhinin	Men's 400m freestyle	3:54.40	26	—N/a		did not advance	
Ilya Druzhinin	Men's 800m freestyle	7:57.54	15	—N/a		did not advance	
Ilya Druzhinin	Men's 1500m freestyle	15:06.43	11	—N/a		did not advance	
Sergey Fesikov	Men's 50m freestyle	22.31	11 q	22.15	13	did not advance	
Sergey Fesikov	Men's 50m backstroke	25.01	8	did not advance			
Vladislav Grinev	Men's 100m freestyle	48.38	1 q	48.48	3 Q	48.36	4
Danila Izotov	Men's 100m freestyle	48.57	3 q	48.82	9	did not advance	
Ilya Khomenko	Men's 50m breaststroke	27.79	20	did not advance			
Ilya Khomenko	Men's 100m breaststroke	59.92	8	did not advance			
Ilya Khomenko	Men's 200m breaststroke	2:09.63	3	did not advance			
Kliment Kolesnikov	Men's 50m backstroke	24.58	2 q	24.25 NR	2 Q	24.00 WR	1st place, gold medalist(s)
Kliment Kolesnikov	Men's 100m backstroke	53.01	2 q	52.95	1 Q	52.53 NR	1st place, gold medalist(s)
Kliment Kolesnikov	Men's 200m backstroke	1:57.31	3	did not advance			
Nikita Korolev	Men's 50m butterfly	23.81	17 SO	did not advance			
Nikita Korolev	Men's 100m butterfly	54.46	43	did not advance			
Oleg Kostin	Men's 50m breaststroke	27.89	23	did not advance			
Oleg Kostin	Men's 100m breaststroke	1:01.05	20	did not advance			
Oleg Kostin	Men's 50m butterfly	23.45	5 q	23.41	8 q	22.97 NR	3rd place, bronze medalist(s)
Egor Kuimov	Men's 50m butterfly	24.77	52	did not advance			
Egor Kuimov	Men's 100m butterfly	52.16	6 q	51.95	6 q	51.65	5
Ivan Kuzmenko	Men's 50m freestyle	22.64	22	did not advance			
Ivan Kuzmenko	Men's 100m freestyle	49.43	21	did not advance			
Semen Makovich	Men's 200m individual medley	2:00.06	7 q	2:00.00	8 q	2:00.07	8
Semen Makovich	Men's 400m individual medley	4:25.88	25	—N/a		did not advance	
Martin Malyutin	Men's 200m freestyle	1:49.97	32	did not advance			
Martin Malyutin	Men's 400m freestyle	3:50.94	15	—N/a		did not advance	
Vladimir Morozov	Men's 50m freestyle	21.85	5 q	21.44 NR	3 Q	21.74	4
Vladimir Morozov	Men's 100m freestyle	48.75	5	did not advance			
Vladimir Morozov	Men's 50m backstroke	24.65	4 q	24.29	3 Q	24.69	4
Kirill Prigoda	Men's 50m breaststroke	27.21	7 q	27.17	8 q	27.18	4
Kirill Prigoda	Men's 100m breaststroke	59.77	6 q	59.92	8 SOq	59.20	4
Kirill Prigoda	Men's 200m breaststroke	2:08.91	2 q	2:08.63	4 Q	2:08.77	5
Evgeny Rylov	Men's 100m backstroke	52.91	1 q	53.20	2 Q	52.74	2nd place, silver medalist(s)
Evgeny Rylov	Men's 200m backstroke	1:56.67	1 q	1:55.50	1 Q	1:53.36 ER	1st place, gold medalist(s)
Aleksandr Sadovnikov	Men's 50m butterfly	23.95	22	did not advance			
Aleksandr Sadovnikov	Men's 100m butterfly	52.53	11 q	51.67	2 Q	51.81	7
Maxim Stupin	Men's 200m backstroke	1:59.60	14	did not advance			
Maxim Stupin	Men's 200m individual medley	2:00.72	12 q	2:01.15	13	did not advance	
Maxim Stupin	Men's 400m individual medley	4:17.60	7 q	—N/a		4:18.41	7
Grigoriy Tarasevich	Men's 100m backstroke	53.34	3	did not advance			
Grigoriy Tarasevich	Men's 200m backstroke	1:57.07	2 q	1:57.62	3 Q	1:57.37	6
Nikita Ulyanov	Men's 50m backstroke	25.29	15	did not advance			
Nikita Ulyanov	Men's 100m backstroke	55.77	34	did not advance			
Mikhail Vekovishchev	Men's 200m freestyle	1:46.67	2 q	1:46.70	4 Q	1:46.79	6
Andrey Zhilkin	Men's 50m freestyle	23.18	44	did not advance			
Andrey Zhilkin	Men's 200m individual medley	2:01.54	17	did not advance			
Sergey Fesikov*; Vladislav Grinev*; Danila Izotov; Kliment Kolesnikov; Ivan Kuzmenko*; Vladimir Morozov; Evgeny Rylov; Andrey Zhilkin*	Men's 4 × 100 m freestyle relay	3:15.77	4 q	—N/a		3:12.23	1st place, gold medalist(s)
Viacheslav Andrusenko*; Mikhail Dovgalyuk; Danila Izotov; Martin Malyutin; Mikhail Vekovishchev	Men's 4 × 200 m freestyle relay	7:09.00	1 q	—N/a		7:06.66	2nd place, silver medalist(s)
Anton Chupkov; Vladislav Grinev*; Kliment Kolesnikov; Egor Kuimov; Vladimir Morozov; Kirill Prigoda*; Evgeny Rylov*; Aleksandr Sadovnikov*	Men's 4 × 100 m medley relay	3:33.08	1 q	—N/a		3:32.03	2nd place, silver medalist(s)

Legend: Q = Semifinalist qualified for the final as the race winner or runner up; q = Qualified for the next round as fastest times (heats) or as a fastest losers (semifinals); SO = Same time as opponent(s), qualification decided via swim-off; N/A = Round not applicable for the event; * = Participated in the heats only (eligible for medals)

Women

Athlete	Event	Heat		Semifinal		Final	
Athlete	Event	Time	Rank	Time	Rank	Time	Rank
Viktoriya Andreyeva	Women's 200m freestyle	1:59.80	14	did not advance			
Viktoriya Andreyeva	Women's 200m individual medley	2:14.91	11 q	2:15.56	12	did not advance	
Anastasiia Avdeeva	Women's 50m backstroke	29.08	27	did not advance			
Anastasiia Avdeeva	Women's 100m backstroke	1:01.17	18	did not advance			
Anastasiia Avdeeva	Women's 200m backstroke	2:10.31	3 q	2:09.54	6 q	2:10.03	5
Svetlana Chimrova	Women's 100m butterfly	58.24	5 q	57.54	2 Q	57.40	2nd place, silver medalist(s)
Svetlana Chimrova	Women's 200m butterfly	2:10.08	6 q	2:08.57	4 Q	2:07.33 NR	2nd place, silver medalist(s)
Yuliya Efimova	Women's 50m breaststroke	30.20	1 q	29.66	1 Q	29.81	1st place, gold medalist(s)
Yuliya Efimova	Women's 100m breaststroke	1:07.25	3 q	1:05.87	1 Q	1:05.53	1st place, gold medalist(s)
Yuliya Efimova	Women's 200m breaststroke	2:27.66	9 q	2:23.49	1 Q	2:21.31	1st place, gold medalist(s)
Yuliya Efimova	Women's 200m individual medley	2:15.35	14 q	Withdrew		did not advance	
Anna Egorova	Women's 400m freestyle	4:10.77	5 q	—N/a		4:06.03 NR	4
Anna Egorova	Women's 800m freestyle	8:29.27	3 q	—N/a		8:24.71	3rd place, bronze medalist(s)
Polina Egorova	Women's 50m backstroke	28.65	21	did not advance			
Polina Egorova	Women's 100m backstroke	1:01.05	17	did not advance			
Polina Egorova	Women's 200m backstroke	2:13.68	11	did not advance			
Polina Egorova	Women's 100m butterfly	1:00.90	28	did not advance			
Anastasia Fesikova	Women's 50m backstroke	27.23 NR	2 q	27.49	2 Q	27.31	2nd place, silver medalist(s)
Anastasia Fesikova	Women's 100m backstroke	59.87	2 q	59.38	1 Q	59.19	1st place, gold medalist(s)
Anastasia Guzhenkova	Women's 200m freestyle	1:58.81	3 q	1:58.18	3 Q	1:56.77	3rd place, bronze medalist(s)
Natalia Ivaneeva	Women's 50m breaststroke	30.60	4 q	30.56	6 q	31.19	7
Natalia Ivaneeva	Women's 100m breaststroke	1:08.64	20	did not advance			
Maria Kameneva	Women's 50m freestyle	24.39 NR	3 q	24.21 NR	3 Q	24.40	4
Maria Kameneva	Women's 100m freestyle	54.46	7 q	53.60 NR	4 Q	54.07	6
Maria Kameneva	Women's 50m backstroke	27.70	4 q	Withdrew		did not advance	
Irina Krivonogova	Women's 200m freestyle	2:00.12	17	did not advance			
Irina Krivonogova	Women's 400m freestyle	4:16.06	13	—N/a		did not advance	
Irina Krivonogova	Women's 400m individual medley	4:58.73	19	—N/a		did not advance	
Rozaliya Nasretdinova	Women's 50m freestyle	25.01	9 q	24.86	6 q	25.04	5
Rozaliya Nasretdinova	Women's 100m freestyle	55.43	20	did not advance			
Rozaliya Nasretdinova	Women's 50m butterfly	26.92	19	did not advance			
Arina Openysheva	Women's 100m freestyle	54.70	11 q	57.07	16	did not advance	
Valeriya Salamatina	Women's 200m freestyle	1:59.47	13 q	1:58.37	4 Q	1:58.63	6
Vitalina Simonova	Women's 50m breaststroke	32.77	35	did not advance			
Vitalina Simonova	Women's 100m breaststroke	1:07.92	10 q	1:07.90	9	did not advance	
Vitalina Simonova	Women's 200m breaststroke	2:26.82	4 q	2:26.89	9	did not advance	
Daria Ustinova	Women's 100m backstroke	1:00.67	13 q	1:00.56	12	did not advance	
Daria Ustinova	Women's 200m backstroke	2:08.89	1 q	2:08.19	3 Q	2:07.12	2nd place, silver medalist(s)
Viktoriya Andreyeva; Maria Kameneva; Rozaliya Nasretdinova*; Arina Openysheva; Valeriya Salamatina	Women's 4 × 100 m freestyle relay	3:39.48	4 q	—N/a		3:38.65	6
Anna Egorova; Anastasia Guzhenkova; Irina Krivonogova*; Arina Openysheva; Valeriya Salamatina	Women's 4 × 200 m freestyle relay	7:57.90	1 q	—N/a		7:52.87	2nd place, silver medalist(s)
Svetlana Chimrova; Yuliya Efimova; Anastasia Fesikova; Maria Kameneva; Arina Openysheva*; Vitalina Simonova*; Daria Ustinova*	Women's 4 × 100 m medley relay	4:02.14	6 q	—N/a		3:54.22	1st place, gold medalist(s)

Legend: Q = Semifinalist qualified for the final as the race winner or runner up; q = Qualified for the next round as fastest times (heats) or as a fastest losers (semifinals); SO = Same time as opponent(s), qualification decided via swim-off; N/A = Round not applicable for the event; * = Participated in the heats only (eligible for medals)

Mixed events

Athlete	Event	Heat		Final	
Athlete	Event	Time	Rank	Time	Rank
Vladislav Grinev; Danila Izotov*; Maria Kameneva; Kliment Kolesnikov; Rozaliya Nasretdinova*; Arina Openysheva	Mixed 4 × 100 m freestyle relay	3:27.15	1 q	3:24.50 NR	3rd place, bronze medalist(s)
Viktoriya Andreyeva; Viacheslav Andrusenko*; Mikhail Dovgalyuk; Anastasia Guzhenkova*; Irina Krivonogova*; Martin Malyutin*; Valeriya Salamatina; Mikhail Vekovishchev	Mixed 4 × 200 m freestyle relay	7:33.16	1 q	7:29.37	2nd place, silver medalist(s)
Viktoriya Andreyeva*; Svetlana Chimrova; Yuliya Efimova; Maria Kameneva*; Ilya Khomenko*; Kliment Kolesnikov; Vladimir Morozov; Grigoriy Tarasevich*	Mixed 4 × 100 m medley relay	3:46.45	3 q	3:42.71 NR	2nd place, silver medalist(s)

Legend: q = Qualified for the next round as fastest times; SO = Same time as opponent(s), qualification decided via swim-off; * = Participated in the heats only (eligible for medals)

=== Synchronized swimming ===
A total of 13 swimmers (1 men and 12 women) represented Russia in the synchronized swimming events.

Athlete	Event	Preliminary		Final	
Athlete	Event	Points	Rank	Points	Rank
Svetlana Kolesnichenko	Solo free routine	95.5333	1 Q	94.9333	1st place, gold medalist(s)
Svetlana Kolesnichenko	Solo technical routine	—N/a		93.4816	1st place, gold medalist(s)
Svetlana Kolesnichenko; Varvara Subbotina	Duet free routine	96.0333	1 Q	96.7000	1st place, gold medalist(s)
Svetlana Kolesnichenko; Varvara Subbotina	Duet technical routine	—N/a		95.1035	1st place, gold medalist(s)
Anastasia Arkhipovskaya; Anastasia Bayandina; Daria Bayandina; Marina Goliadkina; Mikhaela Kalancha; Veronika Kalinina; Polina Komar; Maria Shurochkina; Darina Valitova	Team free routine	95.5000	1 Q	97.0333	1st place, gold medalist(s)
Anastasia Arkhipovskaya; Anastasia Bayandina; Daria Bayandina; Marina Goliadkina; Mikhaela Kalancha; Veronika Kalinina; Polina Komar; Maria Shurochkina; Darina Valitova	Team technical routine	—N/a		94.6000	1st place, gold medalist(s)
Mayya Gurbanberdieva; Aleksandr Maltsev	Mixed duet free routine	—N/a		92.4000	1st place, gold medalist(s)
Mayya Gurbanberdieva; Aleksandr Maltsev	Mixed duet technical routine	—N/a		89.5853	1st place, gold medalist(s)

== Athletics ==
At the time in which the championships took place, Russia was suspended by the International Association of Athletics Federations (IAAF) from competing in international events. Russian athletes cleared by the IAAF to compete entered the championships as Authorised Neutral Athletes.

== Cycling ==
=== BMX ===
A total of 6 riders (3 men and 3 women) represented Russia in the BMX events.

Athlete	Event	Motos		Round of 16		Quarterfinals		Semifinals		Final	
Athlete	Event	Points	Rank	Time	Rank	Time	Rank	Time	Rank	Time	Rank
Aleksandr Katyshev	Men's BMX	8	2 Q	1:28.832	6	did not advance					
Evgeny Kleshchenko	Men's BMX	11	4 Q	35.824	5	did not advance					
Evgeny Komarov	Men's BMX	7	2 Q	36.789	4 Q	35.176	3 Q	35.543	3 Q	36.254	5
Natalia Afremova	Women's BMX	8	3 Q	—N/a				40.133	2 Q	40.922	5
Yaroslava Bondarenko	Women's BMX	7	2 Q	—N/a				41.390	3 Q	40.067	3rd place, bronze medalist(s)
Natalia Suvorova	Women's BMX	8	3 Q	—N/a				40.609	3 Q	41.715	6

=== Mountain biking ===
A total of 5 riders (3 men and 2 women) represented Russia in the mountain bike events.

Athlete	Event	Time	Rank
Timofei Ivanov	Men's cross-country	1:36:27	22
Sergey Nikolaev	Men's cross-country	did not finish	
Anton Sintsov	Men's cross-country	1:34:09	7
Guzel Akhmadullina	Women's cross-country	1:45:30	28
Olga Terentyeva	Women's cross-country	1:39:33	15

=== Road ===
A total of 10 riders (6 men and 4 women) represented Russia in the road events.

Men

Athlete	Event	Time	Rank
Alexander Evtushenko	Time trial	58:10.32	29
Vyacheslav Kuznetsov	Road race	did not finish	
Viktor Manakov	Road race	did not finish	
Artem Ovechkin	Road race	did not finish	
Artem Ovechkin	Time trial	57:06.85	21
Alexander Porsev	Road race	did not finish	
Dmitry Strakhov	Road race	did not finish	

Women

Athlete	Event	Time	Rank
Anastasiia Iakovenko	Road race	3:28:15	17
Elizaveta Oshurkova	Road race	did not finish	
Anastasiia Pliaskina	Road race	did not finish	
Anastasiia Pliaskina	Time trial	46:16	25
Margarita Syrodoeva	Road race	did not finish	
Margarita Syrodoeva	Time trial	46:51	27

=== Track ===
A total of 22 riders (14 men and 8 women) represented Russia in the track events.

Individual sprint

Athlete	Event	Qualification		Round of 32	Round of 16	Quarterfinals	Semifinals	Final	
Athlete	Event	Time Speed (km/h)	Rank	Opposition Time Speed (km/h)	Opposition Time Speed (km/h)	Opposition Time Speed (km/h)	Opposition Time Speed (km/h)	Opposition Time Speed (km/h)	Rank
Denis Dmitriev	Men's sprint	9.863; 73.000	6 Q	Lopatiuk (GEO); W 11.315; 63.632	Kelemen (CZE); W 10.379; 69.370	Lavreysen (NED); L, L	did not advance		6
Pavel Yakushevskiy	Men's sprint	9.880; 72.874	8 Q	Szabo (ROU); W 10.870; 66.237	Lendel (LTU); L	did not advance			9
Daria Shmeleva	Women's sprint	10.959; 65.699	3 Q	Bye	Degrendele (BEL); W 11.684; 61.622	Basova (UKR); W 11.718, W 12.165	Gros (FRA); W 11.628, W 11.508	Voynova (RUS); W 11.514, W 11.496	1st place, gold medalist(s)
Anastasia Voynova	Women's sprint	10.995; 65.484	4 Q	Bye	Łoś (POL); W 11.318; 63.615	Braspennincx (NED); W 11.409, W 11.685	Welte (GER); W 11.277, W 11.305	Shmeleva (RUS); L, L	2nd place, silver medalist(s)

Team sprint

Athlete	Event	Qualification		First round		Final	
Athlete	Event	Time Speed (km/h)	Rank	Opposition Time Speed (km/h)	Rank	Opposition Time Speed (km/h)	Rank
Denis Dmitriev; Shane Perkins; Pavel Yakushevskiy	Men's team sprint	43.973; 61.401	5 Q	France (FRA); L 43.865; 61.552	5	did not advance	
Daria Shmeleva; Anastasia Voynova	Women's team sprint	32.593; 55.226	1 Q	Spain (ESP); W 32.417; 55.526	1 Q	Ukraine (UKR); W 32.452; 55.466	1st place, gold medalist(s)

Pursuit

Athlete	Event	Qualification		First round		Final	
Athlete	Event	Time Speed (km/h)	Rank	Opposition Time Speed (km/h)	Rank	Opposition Time Speed (km/h)	Rank
Alexander Evtushenko	Men's individual pursuit	4:16.028; 56.243	3 Q	—N/a		3rd place final Imhof (SUI); L 4:17.608; 55.898	4
Alexander Evtushenko; Lev Gonov; Ivan Smirnov; Gleb Syritsa	Men's team pursuit	3:58.746; 60.315	5 Q	Poland (POL); L 3:59.095; 60.227	6	did not advance	
Evgenia Augustinas; Gulnaz Badykova; Aleksandra Goncharova; Anastasiia Iakovenko	Women's team pursuit	4:31.382; 53.061	7 Q	Belgium (BEL); L 4:29.235; 53.484	7	did not advance	

Time trial

Athlete	Event	Qualification		Final	
Athlete	Event	Time Speed (km/h)	Rank	Time Speed (km/h)	Rank
Alexander Dubchenko	Men's 1km time trial	1:02.646; 57.465	13	did not advance	
Alexandr Vasyukhno	Men's 1km time trial	1:02.759; 57.362	15	did not advance	
Ekaterina Gnidenko	Women's 500m time trial	34.940; 51.516	10	did not advance	
Daria Shmeleva	Women's 500m time trial	33.309; 54.039	1 Q	33.285; 54.078	1st place, gold medalist(s)

Keirin

Athlete	Event	1st Round	Repechage	2nd Round	Final
Athlete	Event	Rank	Rank	Rank	Rank
Denis Dmitriev	Men's keirin	1 Q	Bye	5	11
Alexander Dubchenko	Men's keirin	6 R	3	Did not advance	17
Daria Shmeleva	Women's keirin	3 R	1 Q	3 Q	3rd place, bronze medalist(s)
Anastasia Voynova	Women's keirin	1 Q	Bye	4	7

Omnium

Athlete	Event	Scratch race		Tempo race		Elimination race		Points race		Total points	Rank
Athlete	Event	Rank	Points	Rank	Points	Rank	Points	Points	Rank	Total points	Rank
Mamyr Stash	Men's omnium	14	14	16	10	13	16	0	13	40	14
Evgenia Augustinas	Women's omnium	14	14	1	40	12	18	32	3	104	4

Madison

Athlete	Event	Qualification		Final	
Athlete	Event	Points	Rank	Points	Rank
Artur Ershov; Maxim Piskunov	Men's madison	12	4 Q	–19	14
Gulnaz Badykova; Diana Klimova	Women's madison	—N/a		38	2nd place, silver medalist(s)

Points

Athlete	Event	Final	
Athlete	Event	Points	Rank
Viktor Manakov	Men's points race	24	12
Gulnaz Badykova	Women's points race	30	3rd place, bronze medalist(s)

Scratch

Athlete	Event	Final
Athlete	Event	Rank
Maxim Piskunov	Men's scratch race	11
Diana Klimova	Women's scratch race	10

Elimination

Athlete	Event	Final
Athlete	Event	Rank
Maxim Piskunov	Men's elimination race	16
Evgenia Augustinas	Women's elimination race	3rd place, bronze medalist(s)

== Golf ==
Russia did not have any golfers in the events.

== Gymnastics ==
A total of 10 athletes (5 men and 5 women) represented Russia in the artistic gymnastics events.

Men
Team

Athlete	Event	Qualification								Final							
Athlete	Event	Apparatus						Total	Rank	Apparatus						Total	Rank
Athlete	Event	F	PH	R	V	PB	HB	Total	Rank	F	PH	R	V	PB	HB	Total	Rank
David Belyavskiy	Team	—N/a	15.000	—N/a	14.100	15.533	12.866	—N/a			14.266	—N/a		15.466	13.066	—N/a	
Artur Dalaloyan	Team	14.600	—N/a	14.533	14.666	15.466	—N/a			14.633	—N/a	14.633	14.500	15.433	—N/a		
Nikolai Kuksenkov	Team	—N/a	14.700	—N/a			12.200	—N/a			14.633	—N/a			13.566	—N/a	
Dmitriy Lankin	Team	14.366	—N/a	14.633	14.200	—N/a				14.333	—N/a	13.566	14.800	—N/a			
Nikita Nagornyy	Team	14.466	14.500	14.666	—N/a	15.266	13.666	—N/a		13.200	13.833	14.200	14.866	14.300	13.966	—N/a	
Total	Team	43.432	44.200	43.832	42.966	46.265	38.732	259.427	1 Q	42.166	42.732	42.399	44.166	45.199	40.598	257.260	1st place, gold medalist(s)

Individual

Athlete	Event	Qualification								Final							
Athlete	Event	Apparatus						Total	Rank	Apparatus						Total	Rank
Athlete	Event	F	PH	R	V	PB	HB	Total	Rank	F	PH	R	V	PB	HB	Total	Rank
David Belyavskiy	Pommel horse	—N/a	15.000	—N/a				15.000	2 Q	—N/a	14.800	—N/a				14.800	4
David Belyavskiy	Parallel bars	—N/a				15.533	—N/a	15.533	1 Q	—N/a				15.166	—N/a	15.166	2nd place, silver medalist(s)
David Belyavskiy	Horizontal bar	—N/a					12.866	12.866	33	did not advance							
Artur Dalaloyan	Floor	14.600	—N/a					14.600	2 Q	14.466	—N/a					14.466	3rd place, bronze medalist(s)
Artur Dalaloyan	Rings	—N/a		14.533	—N/a			14.533	11	did not advance							
Artur Dalaloyan	Vault	—N/a			14.716	—N/a		14.716	3 Q	—N/a			14.900	—N/a		14.900	1st place, gold medalist(s)
Artur Dalaloyan	Parallel bars	—N/a				15.466	—N/a	15.466	2 Q	—N/a				15.433	—N/a	15.433	1st place, gold medalist(s)
Nikolai Kuksenkov	Pommel horse	—N/a	14.700	—N/a				14.700	6 Q	—N/a	14.633	—N/a				14.633	5
Nikolai Kuksenkov	Horizontal bar	—N/a					12.200	12.200	57	did not advance							
Dmitriy Lankin	Floor	14.366	—N/a					14.366	7	did not advance							
Dmitriy Lankin	Rings	—N/a		14.633	—N/a			14.633	9	did not advance							
Dmitriy Lankin	Vault	—N/a			14.383	—N/a		14.383	4 Q	—N/a			14.666	—N/a		14.666	3rd place, bronze medalist(s)
Nikita Nagornyy	Floor	14.466	—N/a					14.466	4 Q	14.433	—N/a					14.433	4
Nikita Nagornyy	Pommel horse	—N/a	14.500	—N/a				14.500	9	did not advance							
Nikita Nagornyy	Rings	—N/a		14.666	—N/a			14.666	7 Q	—N/a		14.633	—N/a			14.633	4
Nikita Nagornyy	Parallel bars	—N/a				15.266	—N/a	15.266	3	did not advance							
Nikita Nagornyy	Horizontal bar	—N/a					13.666	13.666	9	did not advance							

Women
Team

Athlete	Event	Qualification						Final					
Athlete	Event	Apparatus				Total	Rank	Apparatus				Total	Rank
Athlete	Event	V	UB	BB	F	Total	Rank	V	UB	BB	F	Total	Rank
Lilia Akhaimova	Team	14.500	—N/a		11.733	—N/a		14.466	—N/a		13.000	—N/a	
Irina Alexeeva	Team	—N/a	13.933	12.333	—N/a				14.233	13.233	—N/a		
Angelina Melnikova	Team	14.333	14.033	12.766	13.833	—N/a		14.366	14.033	13.333	13.533	—N/a	
Uliana Perebinosova	Team	—N/a	14.266	—N/a					14.033	—N/a			
Angelina Simakova	Team	14.333	—N/a	12.333	13.066	—N/a		14.266	—N/a	13.366	13.333	—N/a	
Total	Team	43.166	42.232	37.432	38.632	161.462	2 Q	43.098	42.299	39.932	39.866	165.195	1st place, gold medalist(s)

Individual

Athlete	Event	Qualification						Final					
Athlete	Event	Apparatus				Total	Rank	Apparatus				Total	Rank
Athlete	Event	V	UB	BB	F	Total	Rank	V	UB	BB	F	Total	Rank
Lilia Akhaimova	Vault	14.016	—N/a			14.016	4 Q	14.066	—N/a			14.066	5
Lilia Akhaimova	Floor	—N/a			11.733	11.733	60	did not advance					
Irina Alexeeva	Uneven bars	—N/a	13.933	—N/a		13.933	7	did not advance					
Irina Alexeeva	Balance beam	—N/a		12.333	—N/a	12.333	29	did not advance					
Angelina Melnikova	Vault	14.166	—N/a			14.166	3 Q	14.233	—N/a			14.233	2nd place, silver medalist(s)
Angelina Melnikova	Uneven bars	—N/a	14.033	—N/a		14.033	6 Q	—N/a	14.366	—N/a		14.366	3rd place, bronze medalist(s)
Angelina Melnikova	Balance beam	—N/a		12.766	—N/a	12.766	16	did not advance					
Angelina Melnikova	Floor	—N/a			13.833	13.833	1 Q	—N/a			13.166	13.166	6
Uliana Perebinosova	Uneven bars	—N/a	14.266	—N/a		14.266	3 Q	—N/a	14.166	—N/a		14.166	5
Angelina Simakova	Vault	13.783	—N/a			13.783	9	did not advance					
Angelina Simakova	Balance beam	—N/a		12.333	—N/a	12.333	29	did not advance					
Angelina Simakova	Floor	—N/a			13.066	13.066	9	did not advance					

== Rowing ==
A total of 32 rowers (23 men and 9 women) represented Russia in the rowing events.

Men

Athlete	Event	Heats		Repechage		Semifinals		Final	
Athlete	Event	Time	Rank	Time	Rank	Time	Rank	Time	Rank
Vladislav Ryabtsev	Single sculls	6:56.42	2 SA/B	—N/a		6:57.96	2 FA	7:00.50	6
Juri Shchelokov	Lightweight single sculls	7:26.21	4 R	7:14.82	2 SA/B	7:15.83	6 FB	7:13.21	10
Grigorii Shchulepov; Alexandr Stradaev	Pair	6:47.94	4 R	6:41.27	1 SA/B	6:32.87	6 FB	6:43.61	9
Anton Kuranov; Nazar Lifshito	Lightweight double sculls	6:41.35	6 R	6:38.72	5 FC	—N/a		6:37.73	16
Artyom Kosov; Nikolay Pimenov; Pavel Sorin; Alexander Vyazovkin	Quadruple sculls	5:52.58	3 R	5:49.00	3 FB	—N/a		5:56.58	7
Aleksandr Bogdashin; Nikita Bolozin; Maksim Telitcyn; Alexandr Tufanyuk	Lightweight quadruple sculls	6:09.36	4 FA	—N/a				6:10.93	4
Daniil Andrienko; Ivan Balandin; Daniil Baranov; Alexander Chaukin; Maksim Golubev; Roman Lomachev; Yuriy Pshenichnikov; Pavel Safonkin; Semen Yaganov	Eight	5:41.71	3 R	5:34.67	4 FA	—N/a		5:41.12	6

Qualification Legend: FA=Final A (medal); FB=Final B (non-medal); FC=Final C (non-medal); FD=Final D (non-medal); FE=Final E (non-medal); FF=Final F (non-medal); SA/B=Semifinals A/B; SC/D=Semifinals C/D; SE/F=Semifinals E/F; QF=Quarterfinals; R=Repechage

Women

Athlete	Event	Heats		Repechage		Semifinals		Final	
Athlete	Event	Time	Rank	Time	Rank	Time	Rank	Time	Rank
Anastasia Lebedeva	Lightweight single sculls	8:08.14	5 R	7:53.41	4 FB	—N/a		7:58.69	9
Elena Oriabinskaia; Ekaterina Potapova; Ekaterina Sevostianova; Anastasia Tikhanova	Four	6:46.30	1 FA	—N/a				6:39.97	1st place, gold medalist(s)
Olga Khalaleeva; Vasilisa Stepanova; Iuliia Volgina; Elena Zakhvatova	Quadruple sculls	6:44.39	5 R	6:28.40	2 FA	—N/a		6:31.05	6

Qualification Legend: FA=Final A (medal); FB=Final B (non-medal); FC=Final C (non-medal); FD=Final D (non-medal); FE=Final E (non-medal); FF=Final F (non-medal); SA/B=Semifinals A/B; SC/D=Semifinals C/D; SE/F=Semifinals E/F; QF=Quarterfinals; R=Repechage

== Triathlon ==
A total of 10 athletes (5 men and 5 women) represented Russia in the triathlon events.

Athlete	Event	Swim (1.5 km)	Trans 1	Bike (40 km)	Trans 2	Run (10 km)	Total Time	Rank
Alexander Bryukhankov	Men's	18:01	0:56	DNF				
Dmitry Polyanski	Men's	16:53	0:58	58:26	0:26	33:22	1:50:05	13
Igor Polyanski	Men's	16:50	0:56	57:14	0:25	33:44	1:49:09	8
Ilya Prasolov	Men's	17:35	0:56	57:45	0:27	33:25	1:50:08	14
Vladimir Turbaevskiy	Men's	17:39	1:04	1:01:14	0:28	36:35	1:57:00	47
Anastasia Abrosimova	Women's	18:46	1:04	1:05:56	0:28	38:49	2:05:03	19
Elena Danilova	Women's	19:19	1:03	1:05:22	0:29	37:51	2:04:04	13
Anastasia Gorbunova	Women's	18:51	1:00	1:05:51	0:31	37:54	2:04:07	14
Ekaterina Matiukh	Women's	19:47	0:59	1:04:59	0:29	38:26	2:04:40	16
Alexandra Razarenova	Women's	19:55	1:06	1:07:39	0:29	36:35	2:05:44	22
Athlete	Event	Swim (300 m)	Trans 1	Bike (6 km)	Trans 2	Run (1.5 km)	Total Time	Rank
Anastasia Gorbunova; Ekaterina Matiukh; Dmitry Polyanski; Igor Polyanski	Mixed team relay	3:48; 4:12; 3:36; 3:43	0:49; 0:43; 0:42; 0:45	9:27; 9:48; 8:45; 9:05	0:32; 0:32; 0:29; 0:30	4:58; 4:58; 5:15; 4:23	1:17:00	10
