= Belgium at the 2018 European Championships =

- IOC code: BEL

in (United Kingdom) Glasgow (Germany) Berlin 2 August 2018 – 12 August 2018
- Competitors: 116 in 57 sports
- Medals Ranked 11th: Gold 6 Silver 5 Bronze 8 Total 19

European Championships appearances
- 2018; 2022

Belgium competed at the inaugural 7 sports 2018 European Championships from 2 to 12 August 2018. It competed in all sports.

== Medallists ==
Medal	Name	Sport	Event	Date
Gold	Nina Derwael	Gymnastics	Women's uneven bars	5 August
Gold	Robbe Ghys; Kenny De Ketele	Cycling	Men's madison	6 August
Gold	Victor Campenaerts	Cycling	Men's road time trial	8 August
Gold	Nafissatou Thiam	Athletics	Women's heptathlon	10 August
Gold	Dylan Borlée; Jonathan Borlée; Kevin Borlée; Jonathan Sacoor; Robin Vanderbemden; Julien Watrin	Athletics	Men's 4 × 400 metres relay	11 August
Gold	Koen Naert	Athletics	Men's marathon	12 August
Silver	Nina Derwael	Gymnastics	Women's balance beam	5 August
Silver	Kenny De Ketele	Cycling	Men's points race	5 August
Silver	Nicky Degrendele	Cycling	Women's keirin	7 August
Silver	Bashir Abdi	Athletics	Men's 10,000 metres	7 August
Silver	Kevin Borlée	Athletics	Men's 400 metres	10 August
Bronze	Jolien D'Hoore	Cycling	Women's scratch	3 August
Bronze	Axelle Klinckaert	Gymnastics	Women's floor exercise	5 August
Bronze	Githa Michiels	Cycling	Women's cross-country	8 August
Bronze	Kimberly Buys	Swimming	Women's 50 metre butterfly	9 August
Bronze	Marten Van Riel	Triathlon	Men's	10 August
Bronze	Jonathan Borlée	Athletics	Men's 400 metres	10 August
Bronze	Claire Michel; Jelle Geens; Valerie Barthelemy; Marten Van Riel	Triathlon	Mixed team relay	11 August
Bronze	Wout Van Aert	Cycling	Men's road race	12 August

== Aquatics ==
=== Swimming ===
Men

Athlete	Event	Heats		Semifinal		Final	
Athlete	Event	Result	Rank	Result	Rank	Result	Rank
Jasper Aerents	100 metre freestyle	49.97	34	did not advance			
Valentin Borisavljevic	100 metre freestyle	50.02	38	did not advance			
Basten Caerts	100 metre breaststroke	1:01.73	32	did not advance			
Louis Croenen	100 metre butterfly	53.39	27	did not advance			
Louis Croenen	200 metre butterfly	1:57.11	8 Q	1:56.58	6 Q	1:56.33	4
Sebastien De Meulemeester	200 metre freestyle	1:50.52	42	did not advance			
Alexandre Marcourt	200 metre freestyle	1:49.46	21	did not advance			
Thomas Thijs	200 metre freestyle	1:49.69	28	did not advance			
Pieter Timmers	50 metre freestyle	DNS		did not advance			
Logan Vanhuys	10 kilometre open water	—N/a				1:50:43.9	19
Emmanuel Vanluchene	100 metre freestyle	50.02	38	did not advance			
Lorenz Weiremans	200 metre freestyle	1:50.35	40	did not advance			
Sebastien De Meulemeester; Emmanuel Vanluchene; Valentin Borisavljevic; Jasper Aerents	4 × 100 metre freestyle relay	3:18.36	14	—N/a		did not advance	
Sebastien De Meulemeester; Alexandre Marcourt; Thomas Thijs; Lorenz Weiremans	4 × 200 metre freestyle relay	7:18.75	10	—N/a		did not advance	

Women

Athlete	Event	Heats		Semifinal		Final	
Athlete	Event	Result	Rank	Result	Rank	Result	Rank
Camille Bouden	400 metre freestyle	4:25.26	25	—N/a		did not advance	
Kimberly Buys	50 metre butterfly	25.80	3 Q	25.76	3 Q	25.74	Bronze medal
Kimberly Buys	100 metre butterfly	58.23	4 Q	58.99	13	did not advance	
Juliette Dumont	50 metre freestyle	26.56	42	did not advance			
Valentine Dumont	100 metre freestyle	DNS					
Valentine Dumont	200 metre freestyle	1:59.30	10 Q	1:58.89	9	did not advance	
Valentine Dumont	400 metre freestyle	4:16.75	14	—N/a		did not advance	
Lotte Goris	200 metre freestyle	2:00.34	19 Q	2:00.69	15	did not advance	
Fanny Lecluyse	50 metre breaststroke	31.43	16 Q	31.57	15	did not advance	
Fanny Lecluyse	100 metre breaststroke	1:08.17	12 Q	1:07.95	10	did not advance	
Fanny Lecluyse	200 metre breaststroke	2:28.77	14 Q	2:25.76	5 Q	2:26.01	6
Valentine Dumont; Juliette Dumont; Lotte Goris; Camille Bouden	4 × 200 metre freestyle relay	8:08.59	9	—N/a		did not advance	

Mixed

Athlete	Event	Heats		Final	
Athlete	Event	Result	Rank	Result	Rank
Jasper Aerents; Emmanuel Vanluchene; Juliette Dumont; Lotte Goris	4 × 100 metre freestyle relay	3:31.76	10	did not advance	
Emmanuel Vanluchene; Basten Caerts; Kimberly Buys; Juliette Dumont	4 × 100 metre medley relay	3:51.22	10	did not advance	

== Athletics ==
Men
Track and road

Athlete	Event	Heats		Semifinal		Final	
Athlete	Event	Result	Rank	Result	Rank	Result	Rank
Robin Vanderbemden	200 metres	20.50	3 Q	20.62	14	did not advance	
Dylan Borlée	400 metres	45.84	10 Q	45.63	17	did not advance	
Jonathan Borlée	400 metres	45.19 SB	1 Q	44.87 SB	2 Q	45.19	Bronze medal
Kevin Borlée	400 metres	45.29 SB	2 Q	45.07 SB	5 q	45.13	Silver medal
Elliott Crestan	800 metres	1:47.35	12	did not advance			
Peter Callahan	1500 metres	3:54.23	30	—N/a		did not advance	
Ismael Debjani	1500 metres	3:41.09	9 q	—N/a		3:39.48	8
Isaac Kimeli	1500 metres	3:42.77	15	—N/a		did not advance	
Soufiane Bouchikhi	5000 metres	—N/a				13:25.22	10
Robin Hendrix	5000 metres	—N/a				13:36.15	15
Isaac Kimeli	5000 metres	—N/a				DQ	
Bashir Abdi	10,00 metres	—N/a				28:11.76	Silver medal
Soufiane Bouchikhi	10,00 metres	—N/a				28:19.04	6
Simon Debognies	10,00 metres	—N/a				29:00.98	15
Koen Naert	Marathon	—N/a				2:09:51 CR	Gold medal
Michael Obasuyi	110 metres hurdles	13.78	13 q	13.78	23	did not advance	
Dylan Borlée; Jonathan Borlée; Kevin Borlée; Jonathan Sacoor (*); Robin Vanderbemden; Julien Watrin (*)	4 × 400 metres relay	3:02.55	4 Q	—N/a		2:59.47 EL	Gold medal

Field events

Athletes	Event	Qualification		Final	
Athletes	Event	Distance	Position	Distance	Position
Bram Ghuys	High jump	2.16	25	did not advance	
Arnaud Art	Pole vault	5.61	9 q	5.65	9
Ben Broeders	Pole vault	NM		did not advance	
Corentin Campener	Long jump	7.41	27	did not advance	

Combined events – Decathlon

Athlete	Event	100 m	LJ	SP	HJ	400 m	110H	DT	PV	JT	1500 m	Final	Rank
Thomas van der Plaetsen	Result	11.48	7.41	13.35	2.05	DNS	DNF						
Thomas van der Plaetsen	Points	757	913	689	850	DNS	DNF						

Women
Track and road

Athlete	Event	Heats		Semifinal		Final	
Athlete	Event	Result	Rank	Result	Rank	Result	Rank
Manon Depuydt	200 metres	23.59	9 q	23.60	20	did not advance	
Cynthia Bolingo Mbongo	400 metres	51.69 PB	2 Q	51.92	16	did not advance	
Camille Laus	400 metres	52.40	12 Q	52.40	21	did not advance	
Renée Eykens	800 metres	2:56.24	32	did not advance			
Elise Vanderelst	1500 metres	4:10.30	13	—N/a		did not advance	
Louise Carton	5000 metres	—N/a				15:53.27	13
Eline Berings	100 metres hurdles	Bye		12.94	9	did not advance	
Hanne Claes	400 metres hurdles	Bye		55.75	9 Q	55.75	4
Justien Grillet	400 metres hurdles	56.94	8 Q	57.40	21	did not advance	
Margo Van Puyvelde	400 metres hurdles	56.70	6 Q	DNS		did not advance	
Cynthia Bolingo Mbongo; Hanne Claes; Justien Grillet; Camille Laus	4 × 400 metres relay	3:30.62	5 Q	—N/a		3:27.69 NR	4

Field events

Athletes	Event	Qualification		Final	
Athletes	Event	Distance	Position	Distance	Position
Claire Orcel	High jump	1.81	23	did not advance	

Combined events – Heptathlon

Athlete	Event	100H	HJ	SP	200 m	LJ	JT	800 m	Final	Rank
Hanne Maudens	Result	14.04	1.73	12.90	24.10 PB	6.42	38.40	2:12.41	6104	10
Hanne Maudens	Points	973	891	721	971	981	637	930	6104	10
Nafissatou Thiam	Result	13.69	1.91	15.35 PB	24.81	6.60	57.91 CB	2:19.35	6816 WL	Gold medal
Nafissatou Thiam	Points	1023	1119	884	904	1040	1014	832	6816 WL	Gold medal
Noor Vidts	Result	14.08 SB	1.79 SB	11.83	24.80	6.04	24.81	2:16.69	5598	20
Noor Vidts	Points	967	966	650	905	862	379	869	5598	20

== Cycling ==
=== Road ===
Men

Athlete	Event	Time	Rank
Victor Campenaerts	Time trial	53:38.78	Gold medal
Dimitri Claeys	Road race	DNF	
Yves Lampaert	Time trial	54:09.77	4
Xandro Meurisse	Road race	5:50:09	6
Jasper Stuyven	Road race	5:52:24	12
Wout Van Aert	Road race	5:50:02	Bronze medal
Greg Van Avermaet	Road race	5:52:34	25
Tosh Van der Sande	Road race	5:54:56	47
Dries Van Gestel	Road race	DNF	
Jelle Wallays	Road race	5:52:34	33

Women

Athlete	Event	Time	Rank
Sanne Cant	Road race	DNF	
Sofie De Vuyst	Road race	3:28:21	22
Valerie Demey	Road race	DNF	
Annelies Dom	Road race	3:34:09	59
Ann-Sophie Duyck	Time trial	44:08	9
Kaat Hannes	Road race	3:28:15	7
Ellen Van Loy	Road race	3:32:02	39

=== Track ===
Elimination race

Athlete	Event	Rank
Moreno De Pauw	Men's elimination race	8
Gilke Croket	Women's elimination race	19

Keirin

Athlete	Event	1st Round	Repechage	2nd Round	Final
Athlete	Event	Rank	Rank	Rank	Rank
Ayrton De Pauw	Men's keirin	5 R	3	did not advance	
Nicky Degrendele	Women's keirin	1 Q	—N/a	1 Q	Silver medal

Madison

Athlete	Event	Qualifying		Final	
Athlete	Event	Points	Rank	Points	Rank
Kenny De Ketele; Robbe Ghys	Men's madison	15	5 Q	60	Gold medal
Jolien D'Hoore; Lotte Kopecky	Women's madison	—N/a		10	6

Omnium

Athlete	Event	Scratch Race		Tempo Race		Elimination Race		Points Race		Total points	Rank
Athlete	Event	Rank	Points	Rank	Points	Rank	Points	Rank	Points	Total points	Rank
Robbe Ghys	Men's omnium	10	22	11	20	6	30	3	31	103	6
Lotte Kopecky	Women's omnium	6	30	3	36	13	16	14	1	83	7

Points race

Athlete	Event	Total points	Rank
Kenny De Ketele	Men's points race	83	Silver medal
Lotte Kopecky	Men's points race	23	6

Pursuit

Athlete	Event	Qualification		Semifinals		Final	
Athlete	Event	Time	Rank	Opponent Results	Rank	Opponent Results	Rank
Sasha Weemaes	Men's individual pursuit	4:40.059	23	—N/a		did not advance	
Isabelle Beckers	Women's individual pursuit	3:50.632	21	—N/a		did not advance	
Annelies Dom	Women's individual pursuit	3:44.537	16	—N/a		did not advance	
Kenny De Ketele; Lindsay De Vylder; Robbe Ghys; Sasha Weemaes	Men's team pursuit	4:00.022	7 Q	Germany; L 3:59.319	7	did not advance	
Shari Bossuyt; Gilke Croket; Annelies Dom; Lotte Kopecky	Women's team pursuit	4:31.147	6 Q	Russia; W 4:28.911	6	did not advance	

Scratch

Athlete	Event	Laps down	Rank
Lindsay De Vylder	Men's scratch	0	10
Jolien D'Hoore	Women's scratch	0	Bronze medal

Sprint

Athlete	Event	Qualification		Round 1	Round 2	Quarterfinals	Semifinals	Final	
Athlete	Event	Time Speed (km/h)	Rank	Opposition Time Speed (km/h)	Opposition Time Speed (km/h)	Opposition Time Speed (km/h)	Opposition Time Speed (km/h)	Opposition Time Speed (km/h)	Rank
Ayrton De Pauw	Men's sprint	10.272; 70.093	20 Q	Dörnbach (GER); L	did not advance				
Nicky Degrendele	Women's sprint	11.321; 63.598	14 Q	Vece (ITA); W 11.482; 62.706	Shmeleva (RUS); L	did not advance			

Time trial

Athlete	Event	Qualifying		Final	
Athlete	Event	Time	Rank	Time	Rank
Ayrton De Pauw	Men's 1 km time trial	1:02.708	14	did not advance	

=== Mountain bike ===
Athlete	Event	Time	Rank
Kevin Panhuyzen	Men's cross-country	1:36:09	19
Jens Schuermans	Men's cross-country	1:34:51	13
Githa Michiels	Women's cross-country	1:34:56	Bronze medal
