= Denmark at the 2018 European Championships =

- WA code: DEN

in (United Kingdom) Glasgow (Germany) Berlin 2 to 12 August
- Competitors: 68 (30 men and 38 women) in 5 sports
- Medals Ranked 20th: Gold 1 Silver 4 Bronze 2 Total 7

European Championships appearances
- 2018; 2022

Denmark competed at the 2018 European Championships in Berlin, Germany; and Glasgow, United Kingdom from 2 to 12 August 2018 in 5 of 7 sports.

== Medallists ==
Medal	Name	Sport	Event	Date
Gold	Amalie Dideriksen; Julie Leth	Cycling (Track)	Women's Madison	7 August
Silver	Pernille Blume	Swimming	Women's 50 m freestyle	4 August
Silver	Emilie Beckmann	Swimming	Women's 50 m butterfly	9 August
Silver	Mie Nielsen; Rikke Møller Pedersen; Emilie Beckmann; Pernille Blume	Swimming	Women's 4x100 m medley relay	9 August
Silver	Simone Christensen	Cycling	Women's BMX	11 August
Bronze	Pernille Blume; Signe Bro; Julie Kepp Jensen; Mie Nielsen; Emily Gantriis*	Swimming	Women's 4x100 m freestyle relay	3 August
Bronze	Casper von Folsach	Cycling (Track)	Men's omnium	4 August

* Participated in the heats only and received medals.

Medals by sport
Sport	Gold medal	Silver medal	Bronze medal	Total
Aquatics	0	3	1	4
Cycling	1	1	1	3
Total	1	4	2	7

Medals by date
Day	Date	Gold medal	Silver medal	Bronze medal	Total
2	3 August	0	0	1	1
3	4 August	0	1	1	2
6	7 August	1	0	0	1
8	9 August	0	2	0	2
10	11 August	0	1	0	1
Total		1	4	2	7

Medals by gender
Gender	Gold medal	Silver medal	Bronze medal	Total
Male	0	0	1	1
Female	1	4	1	6
Total	1	4	2	7

== Athletics ==
A total of 11 athletes have been selected to the team.

== Aquatics ==
=== Swimming ===
Men

Athlete	Event	Heat		Semifinal		Final	
Athlete	Event	Time	Rank	Time	Rank	Time	Rank
Tobias Bjerg	50 m freestyle						
Tobias Bjerg	50 m breaststroke						
Tobias Bjerg	100 m breaststroke	1:01.19	22	did not advance			
Anton Ipsen	800 m freestyle						
Anton Ipsen	1500 m freestyle	15:05.43	10	did not advance			
Anton Ipsen	100 m individual medley						
Viktor Bromer	50 m butterfly	n/a					
Viktor Bromer	100 m butterfly						
Viktor Bromer	200 m butterfly	1:55.90	4	1:55.83	2	1:56.33	4

Women

Athlete	Event	Heat		Semifinal		Final	
Athlete	Event	Time	Rank	Time	Rank	Time	Rank
Pernille Blume	50 m freestyle	24.27	2	23.85	1	23.75	Silver
Pernille Blume	100 m freestyle	52.97	1				
Julie Kepp Jensen	50 m freestyle	25.00	8	25.07	5	did not advance	
Julie Kepp Jensen	100 m freestyle	55.36	19	did not advance			
Julie Kepp Jensen	50 m backstroke	28.37	15	28.37	7	did not advance	
Julie Kepp Jensen	100 m backstroke	1:01.87	25	did not advance			
Julie Kepp Jensen	50 m butterfly						
Emily Gantriis	100 m freestyle	56.09	28	did not advance			
Emily Gantriis	200 m freestyle	2:02.78	34	did not advance			
Signe Bro	100 m freestyle	54.08	5				
Signe Bro	200 m freestyle	2:00.97	23	did not advance			
Maria Grandt	200 m freestyle	2:03.59	43	did not advance			
Maria Grandt	400 m freestyle						
Maria Grandt	800 m freestyle	8:42.68	14	did not advance			
Maria Grandt	1500 m freestyle	16:54.92	12	did not advance			
Helena Bach	400 m freestyle						
Helena Bach	800 m freestyle	8:42.46	12	did not advance			
Helena Bach	1500 m freestyle	16:48.05	10	did not advance			
Helena Bach	200 m butterfly	2:12.32	14	2:13.14	6	did not advance	
Mie Østergård Nielsen	50 m backstroke	27.97	7	28.14	7	did not advance	
Mie Østergård Nielsen	100 m backstroke	59.99	3	59.89	3		
Victoria Bierre	50 m backstroke	29.04	26	did not advance			
Victoria Bierre	100 m backstroke	1:02.55	30	did not advance			
Victoria Bierre	200 m backstroke						
Thea Blomsterberg	50 m breaststroke						
Thea Blomsterberg	100 m breaststroke	1:09.91	34	did not advance			
Thea Blomsterberg	200 m breaststroke	2:25.98	2	2:27.29	5	did not advance	
Anna Wermuth	50 m breaststroke						
Anna Wermuth	100 m breaststroke	1:08.93	22	did not advance			
Anna Wermuth	200 m breaststroke	2:27.78	12	did not advance			
Rikke Møller Pedersen	50 m breaststroke						
Rikke Møller Pedersen	100 m breaststroke	1:07.90	9	1:07.96	5	did not advance	
Rikke Møller Pedersen	200 m breaststroke	2:25.73	1	2:24.56	3		
Mathilde Schrøder	50 m breaststroke						
Mathilde Schrøder	100 m breaststroke	1:08.53	15	1:08.76	8	did not advance	
Emilie Beckmann	50 m butterfly						
Emilie Beckmann	100 m butterfly	58.69	9	58.40	5	58.45	7
Pernille Blume; Signe Bro; Julie Kepp Jensen; Mie Østergård Nielsen; Emily Gantriis	4x100 m freestyle relay	3:41.28	8	n/a		3:37.03	Bronze
Helena Bach; Laura Glerup Jensen; Maria Grandt; Emily Gantriis	4x200 m freestyle relay	8:04.63					
Mie Nielsen; Rikke Møller Pedersen; Emilie Beckmann; Pernille Blume	4x100 m medley relay						

== Cycling ==
=== BMX ===
Athlete	Event	Round 1		Last chance		Round of 32		Round of 16		Quarterfinals		Semifinal		Final	
Athlete	Event	Result	Rank	Result	Rank	Result	Rank	Result	Rank	Result	Rank	Result	Rank	Result	Rank
Jimmi Therkelsen	Men's race														
Andreas Wöhlk	Men's race														
Simone Tetsche Christiansen	Women's race														

=== Mountain biking ===
Athlete	Event	Time	Rank
Sebastian Fini Carstensen	Men's cross-country		

=== Road ===
Athlete	Event	Time	Rank
Michael Carbel Svendgaard	Men's road race		
Kasper Asgreen	Men's road race		
Lasse Norman Hansen	Men's road race		
Alexander Kamp	Men's road race		
Michael Mørkøv	Men's road race		
Magnus Cort Nielsen	Men's road race		
Casper Phillip Pedersen	Men's road race		
Mads Perdersen	Men's road race		
Martin Toft Madsen	Men's time trial		
Rasmus Quade	Men's time trial		
Rikke Lønne	Women's road race	3:32:02	38
Christina Malling Siggaard	Women's road race	3:28:15	6
Louise Norman Hansen	Women's road race	DNF	
Pernille Mathisen	Women's road race	3:32:02	56
Pernille Mathisen	Women's time trial		

=== Track ===
==== Team pursuit ====
Athlete	Event	Qualifying		First round		Final	
Athlete	Event	Time	Rank	Time	Rank	Time	Rank
Casper von Folsach; Mathias Malmberg; Oliver Frederiksen; Rasmus Pedersen	Men’s team pursuit	4:06.124	10	did not qualify			

==== Omnium ====
Name	Event	Scratch Race	Tempo Race	Elim. Race	Points Race	Total Points	Rank
Casper von Folsach	Men's omnium	30	30	26	27	113	Bronze
Amalie Dideriksen	Women's omnium	26	22	30			10

==== Madison ====
Athlete	Event	First round				Final			
Athlete	Event	Lap points	Sprint points	Total	Rank	Lap points	Sprint points	Total	Rank
Casper von Folsach; Oliver Frederiksen	Men’s Madison	0	11	11	5	0	4	4	9
Amalie Dideriksen; Julie Leth	Women’s Madison	n/a				20	22	42	Gold

==== Pursuit ====
Athlete	Event	Qualifying			Final		
Athlete	Event	Time	Behind	Rank	Time	Behind	Rank
Trine Schmidt	Women’s Pursuit	3:36.549	6.411	7	did not qualify		
Julie Leth	Women’s Pursuit	3:38.328	10.176	10	did not qualify		

==== Point race ====
Name	Event	Lap points	Sprint points	Total points	Finish order	Rank
Mathias Malmberg	Points race	0	13	13	1	13
Amalie Dideriksen	Points race	0	0	8	3	13

==== Scratch ====
Name	Event	Rank
Trine Schmidt	Scratch	6

==== Elimination Race ====
Name	Event	Rank
Trine Schmidt	Elimination race	10

== Golf ==
Denmark was represented by one men's teams.

Men

Team	Event	Pool play				Semifinal	Final / BM	
Team	Event	Opposition Score	Opposition Score	Opposition Score	Rank	Opposition Score	Opposition Score	Rank
Martin Ovesen; Niklas Norsgaard Møller	Men's team	Meronk / Gradecki (POL); Lost: 1 down	Santos / Lima (POR); Lost: 2 & 1	Oriol / Fernández (ESP); Won: 4 & 3	4	did not advance		

== Gymnastics ==
Men

Athlete	Event	Qualification		Final	
Athlete	Event	Points	Rank	Points	Rank
Jacob Buus	Parallel bars				
Jacob Buus	Horizontal bar				
Marcus Frandsen	Floor				
Marcus Frandsen	Pommel horse				
Marcus Frandsen	Vault				
Marcus Frandsen	Parallel bars				
Marcus Frandsen	Horizontal bar				
Joao Fuglsig	Floor				
Joao Fuglsig	Pommel horse				
Joao Fuglsig	Rings				
Joao Fuglsig	Vault				
Joao Fuglsig	Parallel bars				
Christian Riisberg	Floor				
Christian Riisberg	Vault				
Joachim Winther	Pommel Horse				
Joachim Winther	Rings				
Joachim Winther	Horizontal bar				
Jacob Buus; Marcus Frandsen; Joao Fuglsig; Christian Riisberg; Joachim Winther	Men’s team				

Women

Athlete	Event	Qualification		Final	
Athlete	Event	Points	Rank	Points	Rank
Sofia Bjørnholdt	Vault				
Sofia Bjørnholdt	Balance beam				
Mette Hulgaard	Vault				
Mette Hulgaard	Uneven bars				
Mette Hulgaard	Floor				
Victoria Kajø	Balance beam				
Victoria Kajø	Floor				
Linnea Højer Wang	Uneven bars				
Linnea Højer Wang	Balance beam				
Linnea Højer Wang	Floor				
Emilie Winther	Vault				
Emilie Winther	Uneven bars				
Sofia Bjørnholdt; Mette Hulgaard; Victoria Kajø; Linnea Højer Wang; Emilie Winther	Women’s team		24	did not qualify	

== Rowing ==
Men

Athlete	Event	Heat 1		Repechage		Final C		Final B		Final A		Rank
Athlete	Event	Time	Rank	Time	Rank	Time	Rank	Time	Rank	Time	Rank	Rank
Sebastian Terp	Men’s lightweight single scull	7:39.98	4	1:24.63	5	7:23.59	2	did not advance				14
Frank Steffensen	Men’s single scull	7:15.73	6	1:03.92	5	7:03.16	2	did not advance				14
Christoffer Kruse; Nick Larsen	Men’s pair	7:00.01	5	6:53.09	5	6:45.61	4	did not advance				16

Women

Athlete	Event	Heat 1		Repechage		Final C		Final B		Final A		Rank
Athlete	Event	Time	Rank	Time	Rank	Time	Rank	Time	Rank	Time	Rank	Rank
Mette Petersen	Women’s single scull	7:42.93	3	7:41.82	1	n/a				7:50.82	6	6
Silja Davidsen; Tanja Ehlers; Luise Lund Hansen; Nikoline Laidlaw	Women’s four	6:54.87	4	6:50.13	3	n/a		6:54.56	1	did not advance		7

== Triathlon ==
Athlete	Event	Swim (1.5 km)	Trans 1	Bike (40 km)	Trans 2	Run (10 km)	Total time	Rank
Andreas Schilling	Men's individual							
Emil Deleuran Hansen	Men's individual							
Emil Holm	Men's individual							
Alberte Kjær Pedersen	Women's individual							
Sif Bendix Madsen	Women's individual							
Anne Holm	Women's individual							
