= Great Britain and Northern Ireland at the 2018 European Championships =

- WA code: GBR

in (United Kingdom) Glasgow (Germany) Berlin 2 August 2018 – 12 August 2018
- Competitors: 313
- Medals Ranked 2nd: Gold 26 Silver 26 Bronze 22 Total 74

European Championships appearances
- 2018; 2022

The United Kingdom, competing under the team name "Great Britain and Northern Ireland", was one of the host nations of the inaugural 2018 European Championships in Berlin, Germany and Glasgow, United Kingdom. Great Britain and Northern Ireland competed at the championships which lasted from 2 to 12 August 2018. Great Britain and Northern Ireland competed in 7 sports.

== Medallists ==
Medal	Name	Sport	Event	Date
Gold	Katie Archibald; Laura Kenny; Elinor Barker; Neah Evans; Ellie Dickinson*	Cycling	Women's team pursuit	3 August
Gold	Adam Peaty	Swimming	Men's 100m breaststroke	4 August
Gold	Ethan Hayter	Cycling	Men's omnium	4 August
Gold	Calum Jarvis; Duncan Scott; Thomas Dean; James Guy; Stephen Milne*; Cameron Kurle*	Swimming	Men's 4 × 200 m freestyle relay	5 August
Gold	Georgia Davies	Swimming	Women's 50m backstroke	5 August
Gold	Laura Kenny	Cycling	Women's elimination race	5 August
Gold	Georgia Davies; Adam Peaty; James Guy; Freya Anderson; Nicholas Pyle*; Charlotte Atkinson*	Swimming	Mixed 4 × 100 m medley relay	6 August
Gold	Dina Asher-Smith	Athletics	Women's 100m	7 August
Gold	Zharnel Hughes	Athletics	Men's 100m	7 August
Gold	Duncan Scott	Swimming	Men's 200m freestyle	7 August
Gold	Ellie Faulkner; Kathryn Greenslade; Holly Hibbott; Freya Anderson; Lucy Hope*	Swimming	Women's 4 × 200 m freestyle relay	7 August
Gold	Jack Laugher	Diving	Men's 1m springboard	7 August
Gold	Eden Cheng; Lois Toulson	Diving	Women's 10m synchro	7 August
Gold	Matthew Walls	Cycling	Men's elimination race	7 August
Gold	Adam Peaty	Swimming	Men's 50m breaststroke	8 August
Gold	Ben Proud	Swimming	Men's 50m freestyle	9 August
Gold	Nicholas Pyle; Adam Peaty; James Guy; Duncan Scott; Brodie Williams*; James Wilby*; Jacob Peters*	Swimming	Men's 4 × 100 m medley relay	9 August
Gold	Jack Laugher	Diving	Men's 3m springboard	9 August
Silver	Emily Kay	Cycling	Women's scratch	3 August
Silver	James Wilby	Swimming	Men's 100m breaststroke	4 August
Silver	Katie Archibald	Cycling	Women's individual pursuit	4 August
Silver	Thomas Ford; Jacob Dawson; Adam Neill; James Johnston	Rowing	Men's coxless four	4 August
Silver	Duncan Scott	Swimming	Men's 100m freestyle	5 August
Silver	Anastasia Merlott Chilly; Rebecca Girling; Fiona Gammond; Katherine Douglas; Holly Hill; Holly Norton; Karen Bennett; Rebecca Shorten; Matilda Horn	Rowing	Women's coxed eight	5 August
Silver	James Wilby	Swimming	Men's 200m breaststroke	6 August
Silver	Katie Archibald	Cycling	Women's omnium	6 August
Silver	Reece Prescod	Athletics	Men's 100m	7 August
Silver	Ben Proud	Swimming	Men's 50m butterfly	7 August
Silver	Georgia Davies	Swimming	Women's 100m backstroke	7 August
Silver	Ross Haslam; Grace Reid	Diving	Mixed 3m springboard synchro	8 August
Silver	Nethaneel Mitchell-Blake	Athletics	Men's 200m	9 August
Silver	Max Litchfield	Swimming	Men's 400m individual medley	9 August
Silver	Imogen Clark	Swimming	Women's 50m breaststroke	9 August
Silver	Matthew Dixon; Noah Williams	Diving	Men's 10m synchro	9 August
Silver	Jess Learmonth	Triathlon	Women's triathlon	9 August
Silver	Jack Laugher; Chris Mears	Diving	Men's 3m synchro springboard	10 August
Bronze	Hannah Miley	Swimming	Women's 400m individual medley	3 August
Bronze	Ethan Hayter; Kian Emadi; Charlie Tanfield; Steven Burke; Oliver Wood*	Cycling	Men's team pursuit	3 August
Bronze	Stephen Milne; Craig McLean; Kathryn Greenslade; Freya Anderson; Cameron Kurle*; Holly Hibbott*	Swimming	Mixed 4 × 200 m freestyle relay	4 August
Bronze	Harry Leask; Jack Beaumont	Rowing	Men's double sculls	5 August
Bronze	Sam Mottram	Rowing	Men's lightweight single sculls	5 August
Bronze	Max Litchfield	Swimming	Men's 200m individual medley	6 August
Bronze	Alys Thomas	Swimming	Women's 200m butterfly	6 August
Bronze	Oliver Wood; Ethan Hayter	Cycling	Men's madison	6 August
Bronze	James Heatly	Diving	Men's 1m springboard	7 August
Bronze	Molly Renshaw	Swimming	Women's 200m breaststroke	7 August
Bronze	Jack Carlin	Cycling	Men's keirin	7 August
Bronze	Holly Bradshaw	Athletics	Women's pole vault	9 August
Bronze	James Guy	Swimming	Men's 100m butterfly	9 August
Bronze	Holly Hibbott	Swimming	Women's 400m freestyle	9 August
Bronze	Georgia Davies; Siobhan-Marie O'Connor; Alys Thomas; Freya Anderson; Kathleen Dawson*	Swimming	Women's 4 × 100 m medley relay	9 August

* Participated in the heats only and received medals.

Medals by sport
Sport	Gold medal	Silver medal	Bronze medal	Total
Aquatics	13	12	9	34
Athletics	7	5	6	18
Cycling	5	4	3	12
Gymnastics	1	1	1	3
Rowing	0	2	2	4
Golf	0	1	1	2
Triathlon	0	1	0	1
Total	26	26	22	74

Medals by date
Day	Date	Gold medal	Silver medal	Bronze medal	Total
2	3 August	1	1	2	4
3	4 August	2	3	1	6
4	5 August	3	2	2	7
5	6 August	1	2	3	6
6	7 August	7	4	3	14
6	8 August	1	1	0	2
7	9 August	3	4	4	11
8	10 August	1	2	2	5
9	11 August	3	6	2	11
10	12 August	4	1	3	8
Total		26	26	22	74

Medals by gender
Gender	Gold medal	Silver medal	Bronze medal	Total
Male	15	13	10	38
Female	10	10	11	31
Mixed events	1	3	1	5
Total	26	26	22	74

== See also ==
- Great Britain and Northern Ireland at the 2018 European Athletics Championships
