= Michaela Ebert =

German cyclist

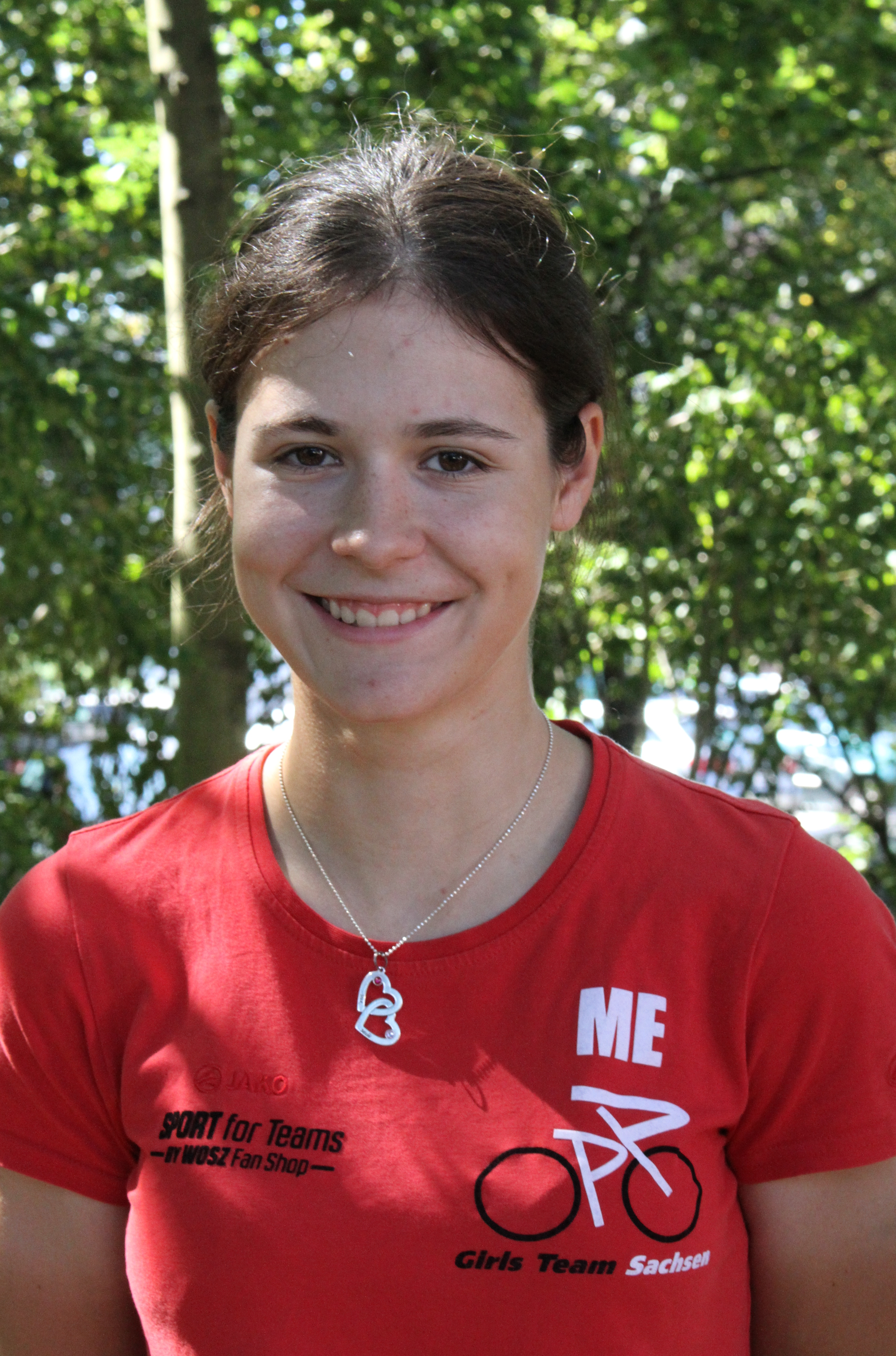

Personal information
- Born: 7 June 1997 (age 29)

Cycling career
- Sport: Cycling
- Discipline: Track cycling

Michaela Ebert (born 7 June 1997) is a German female track cyclist, representing Germany at international competitions. She competed at the 2016 UEC European Track Championships in the team pursuit.

== Major results ==
2017
2nd Madison, Oberhausen (with Lisa Küllmer)
3rd Madison, GP Zürich - Oerlikon (with Lisa Küllmer)
