= Maria Polyakova =

Russian diver (born 1997)

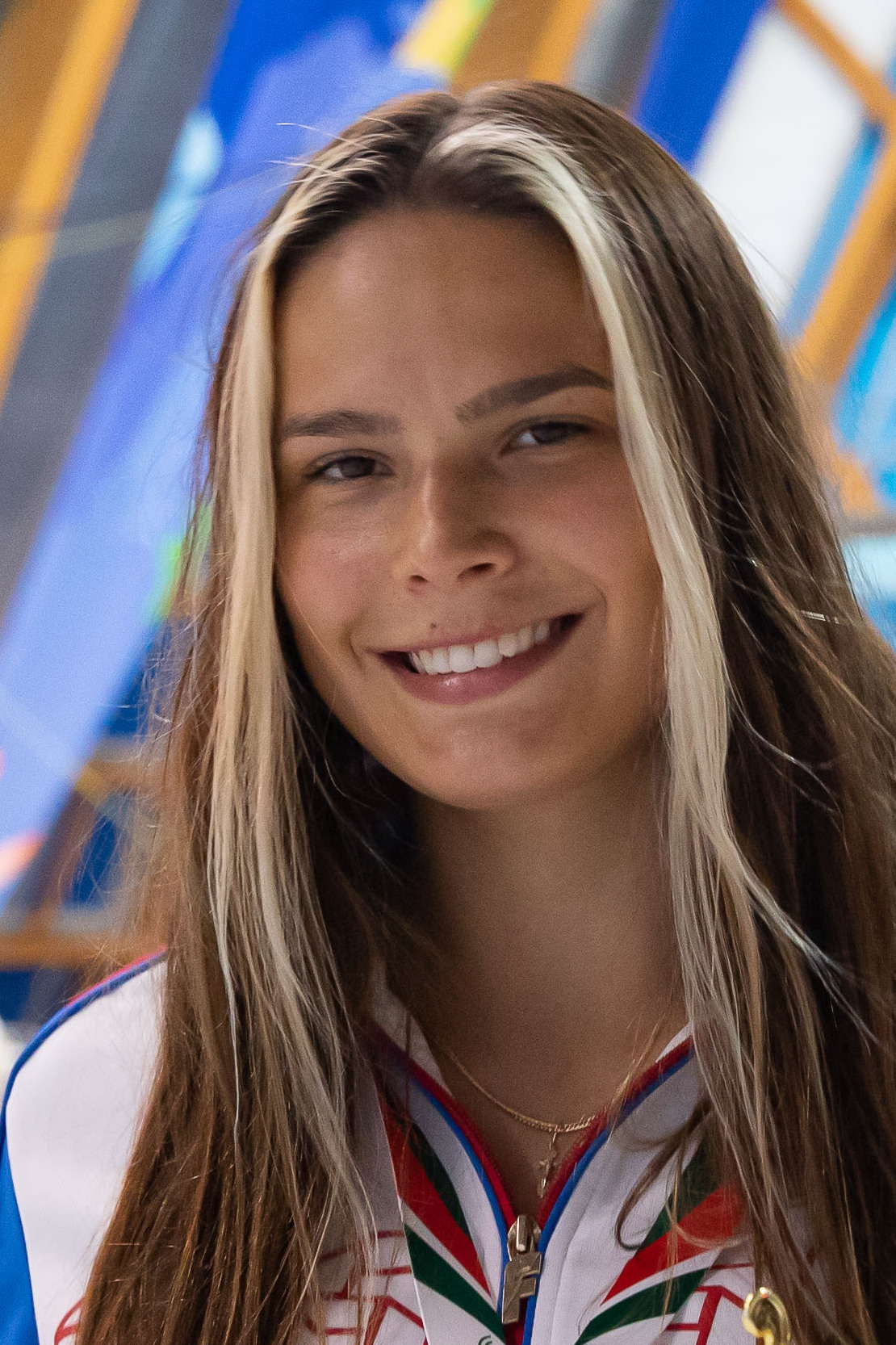

Personal information
- Native name: Мария Полякова
- Full name: Maria Yuryevna Polyakova
- Nationality: (Russia) Russian
- Born: 8 May 1997 (age 29)
- Height: 1.57 m (5 ft 2 in)

Sport
- Country: Russia
- Sport: Diving
- Events: 1 m, 3 m
Medal record
Representing Russia
European Games
| Gold medal – first place | 2015 Baku | 1 m springboard |
| Silver medal – second place | 2015 Baku | 3 m synchronized |
European Championships
| Gold medal – first place | 2018 Glasgow | 1 m springboard |
Summer Universiade
| Silver medal – second place | 2017 Taipei | Team |
| Bronze medal – third place | 2017 Taipei | 3 m synchronized |
Representing UCLA Bruins
NCAA Championships
| Gold medal – first place | 2019 Austin | 3 m |
| Silver medal – second place | 2019 Austin | 1 m |

Maria Yuryevna Polyakova (Russian: Мария Юрьевна Полякова; born 8 May 1997) is a Russian diver.

== Career ==
She is a European Games and European champion. Polyakova also competed in NCAA diving for the UCLA Bruins, becoming UCLA’s first national champion in women’s diving, and graduating as the university’s record holder in both the 1 and 3 metres. She was named Pac-12 Diver of the Year in 2017 and 2019.

Polyakova has qualified for the 2020 Summer Olympics.

== Personal life ==
Maria was born on 8 May 1997. She was a student-athlete majoring in linguistics at the University of California, Los Angeles, and graduated in 2019.
