= Diving at the 2018 European Aquatics Championships – Women's 1 m springboard =

Women's 1 m springboard at the 2018 European Aquatics Championships
- Venue: Royal Commonwealth Pool
- Dates: 10 August
- Competitors: 18 from 11 nations
- Winning points: 285.55

Medalists
| gold medal | Mariia Poliakova | Russia |
| silver medal | Nadezhda Bazhina | Russia |
| bronze medal | Elena Bertocchi | Italy |

The Women's 1 m springboard competition of the 2018 European Aquatics Championships was held on 10 August 2018.

== Results ==
The preliminary round was started at 09:30. The final was held at 15:15.

Green denotes finalists

| Rank | Diver | Nationality | Preliminary | | Final | |
| Rank | Diver | Nationality | Points | Rank | Points | Rank |
|---|---|---|---|---|---|---|
| 1st place, gold medalist(s) | Mariia Poliakova | Russia | 251.85 | 4 | 285.55 | 1 |
| 2nd place, silver medalist(s) | Nadezhda Bazhina | Russia | 263.60 | 2 | 276.00 | 2 |
| 3rd place, bronze medalist(s) | Elena Bertocchi | Italy | 258.20 | 3 | 271.25 | 3 |
| 4 | Tina Punzel | Germany | 273.70 | 1 | 254.10 | 4 |
| 5 | Viktoriya Kesar | Ukraine | 230.50 | 10 | 245.40 | 5 |
| 6 | Hanna Pysmenska | Ukraine | 241.60 | 7 | 237.85 | 6 |
| 7 | Kaja Skrzek | Poland | 222.65 | 11 | 237.60 | 7 |
| 8 | Alena Khamulkina | Belarus | 241.50 | 8 | 229.40 | 8 |
| 9 | Michelle Heimberg | Switzerland | 249.10 | 5 | 229.35 | 9 |
| 10 | Katherine Torrance | Great Britain | 217.35 | 12 | 228.90 | 10 |
| 11 | Louisa Stawczynski | Germany | 243.20 | 6 | 221.50 | 11 |
| 12 | Jessica Favre | Switzerland | 241.30 | 9 | 216.30 | 12 |
| 13 | Daniella Nero | Sweden | 216.80 | 13 | did not advance | |
| 14 | Roosa Kanerva | Finland | 212.15 | 14 | did not advance | |
| 15 | Scarlett Mew Jensen | Great Britain | 209.75 | 15 | did not advance | |
| 16 | Laura Bilotta | Italy | 209.40 | 16 | did not advance | |
| 17 | Marcela Marić | Croatia | 206.80 | 17 | did not advance | |
| 18 | Indrė Girdauskaitė | Lithuania | 197.75 | 18 | did not advance | |
