= 2018 UEC European Track Championships – Women's sprint =

Women's sprint at the 2018 UEC European Track Championships
- Venue: Sir Chris Hoy Velodrome, Glasgow
- Date: 4–5 August
- Competitors: 22 from 13 nations

Medalists
gold medal	Daria Shmeleva	Russia
silver medal	Anastasia Voynova	Russia
bronze medal	Mathilde Gros	France

The women's sprint competition at the 2018 UEC European Track Championships was held on 4 and 5 August 2018.

== Results ==
=== Qualifying ===
Top 10 riders qualify for 1/8 finals, 11th to 22nd places qualify for 1/16 finals.

Rank	Name	Nation	Time	Behind	Notes
1	Emma Hinze	Germany	10.887		Q
2	Mathilde Gros	France	10.893	+0.006	Q
3	Daria Shmeleva	Russia	10.959	+0.072	Q
4	Anastasia Voynova	Russia	10.995	+0.108	Q
5	Shanne Braspennincx	Netherlands	10.995	+0.108	Q
6	Hetty van de Wouw	Netherlands	11.006	+0.119	Q
7	Miglė Marozaitė	Lithuania	11.044	+0.157	Q
8	Katy Marchant	Great Britain	11.053	+0.166	Q
9	Miriam Welte	Germany	11.102	+0.215	Q
10	Olena Starikova	Ukraine	11.124	+0.237	Q
11	Lyubov Basova	Ukraine	11.187	+0.300	q
12	Tania Calvo	Spain	11.262	+0.375	q
13	Robyn Stewart	Ireland	11.287	+0.400	q
14	Nicky Degrendele	Belgium	11.321	+0.434	q
15	Lauren Bate-Lowe	Great Britain	11.330	+0.443	q
16	Sandie Clair	France	11.349	+0.462	q
17	Julita Jagodzińska	Poland	11.417	+0.530	q
18	Sára Kaňkovská	Czech Republic	11.429	+0.542	q
19	Miriam Vece	Italy	11.456	+0.569	q
20	Urszula Łoś	Poland	11.489	+0.602	q
21	Gloria Manzoni	Italy	11.749	+0.862	q
22	Helena Casas	Spain	11.842	+0.955	q

=== 1/16 finals ===
Heat winners advanced to the 1/8 finals.

Heat	Rank	Name	Nation	Time	Notes
1	1	Lyubov Basova	Ukraine	11.891	Q
1	2	Helena Casas	Spain		
2	1	Tania Calvo	Spain	11.923	Q
2	2	Gloria Manzoni	Italy		
3	1	Urszula Łoś	Poland	11.713	Q
3	2	Robyn Stewart	Ireland		
4	1	Nicky Degrendele	Belgium	11.482	Q
4	2	Miriam Vece	Italy		
5	1	Lauren Bate-Lowe	Great Britain	11.767	Q
5	2	Sára Kaňkovská	Czech Republic		
6	1	Julita Jagodzińska	Poland	12.197	Q
6	2	Sandie Clair	France		

=== 1/8 finals ===
Heat winners advanced to the quarterfinals.

Heat	Rank	Name	Nation	Time	Notes
1	1	Julita Jagodzińska	Poland	12.407	Q
1	2	Emma Hinze	Germany		
2	1	Mathilde Gros	France	11.503	Q
2	2	Lauren Bate-Lowe	Great Britain		
3	1	Daria Shmeleva	Russia	11.684	Q
3	2	Nicky Degrendele	Belgium		
4	1	Anastasia Voynova	Russia	11.318	Q
4	2	Urszula Łoś	Poland		
5	1	Shanne Braspennincx	Netherlands	11.511	Q
5	2	Tania Calvo	Spain		
6	1	Lyubov Basova	Ukraine	11.540	Q
6	2	Hetty van de Wouw	Netherlands		
7	1	Olena Starikova	Ukraine	11.584	Q
7	2	Miglė Marozaitė	Lithuania		
8	1	Miriam Welte	Germany	11.568	Q
8	2	Katy Marchant	Great Britain		

=== Quarterfinals ===
Matches are extended to a best-of-three format hereon; winners proceed to the semifinals.

Heat	Rank	Name	Nation	Race 1	Race 2	Decider (i.r.)	Notes
1	1	Miriam Welte	Germany	11.669	11.761		Q
1	2	Julita Jagodzińska	Poland				
2	1	Mathilde Gros	France	11.266	11.553		Q
2	2	Olena Starikova	Ukraine				
3	1	Daria Shmeleva	Russia	11.718	12.165		Q
3	2	Lyubov Basova	Ukraine				
4	1	Anastasia Voynova	Russia	11.409	11.685		Q
4	2	Shanne Braspennincx	Netherlands				

=== Semifinals ===
Winners proceed to the gold medal final; losers proceed to the bronze medal final.

Heat	Rank	Name	Nation	Race 1	Race 2	Decider (i.r.)	Notes
1	1	Anastasia Voynova	Russia	11.277	11.305		QG
1	2	Miriam Welte	Germany				QB
2	1	Daria Shmeleva	Russia	11.628	11.508		QG
2	2	Mathilde Gros	France				QB

=== Finals ===
Rank	Name	Nation	Race 1	Race 2	Decider (i.r.)
Gold medal final
1st place, gold medalist(s)	Daria Shmeleva	Russia	11.514	11.496	
2nd place, silver medalist(s)	Anastasia Voynova	Russia			
Bronze medal final
3rd place, bronze medalist(s)	Mathilde Gros	France	11.730	11.381	
4	Miriam Welte	Germany			
