= 2018 UEC European Track Championships – Women's scratch =

Women's scratch at the 2018 UEC European Track Championships
- Venue: Sir Chris Hoy Velodrome, Glasgow
- Date: 3 August
- Competitors: 22 from 22 nations

Medalists
gold medal	Kirsten Wild	Netherlands
silver medal	Emily Kay	Great Britain
bronze medal	Jolien D'Hoore	Belgium

The women's scratch competition at the 2018 UEC European Track Championships was held on 3 August 2018.

== Results ==
First rider across the line without a net lap loss wins.

Rank	Name	Nation	Laps down
1st place, gold medalist(s)	Kirsten Wild	Netherlands	
2nd place, silver medalist(s)	Emily Kay	Great Britain	
3rd place, bronze medalist(s)	Jolien D'Hoore	Belgium	
4	Rachele Barbieri	Italy	
5	Hanna Tserakh	Belarus	
6	Trine Schmidt	Denmark	
7	Clara Copponi	France	
8	Shannon McCurley	Ireland	
9	Alžbeta Bačíková	Slovakia	
10	Diana Klimova	Russia	
11	Lisa Küllmer	Germany	
12	Verena Eberhardt	Austria	
13	Aline Seitz	Switzerland	
14	Olivija Baleišytė	Lithuania	
15	Anita Stenberg	Norway	
16	Irene Usabiaga	Spain	
17	Maria Martins	Portugal	
18	Viktoriya Bondar	Ukraine	
19	Łucja Pietrzak	Poland	
20	Ana Maria Covrig	Romania	
21	Sara Ferrara	Finland	
22	Jarmila Machačová	Czech Republic	
