= 2018 UEC European Track Championships – Women's keirin =

Women's keirin at the 2018 UEC European Track Championships
- Venue: Sir Chris Hoy Velodrome, Glasgow
- Date: 7 August
- Competitors: 22 from 13 nations

Medalists
gold medal	Mathilde Gros	France
silver medal	Nicky Degrendele	Belgium
bronze medal	Daria Shmeleva	Russia

The women's keirin competition at the 2018 UEC European Track Championships was held on 7 August 2018.

== Results ==
=== First round ===
The first two riders in each heat qualified to the second round, all other riders advanced to the first round repechages.

Heat 1

Rank	Name	Nation	Notes
1	Anastasia Voynova	Russia	Q
2	Shanne Braspennincx	Netherlands	Q
3	Urszula Łoś	Poland	
4	Robyn Stewart	Ireland	
5	Sára Kaňkovská	Czech Republic	

Heat 2

Rank	Name	Nation	Notes
1	Katy Marchant	Great Britain	Q
2	Mathilde Gros	France	Q
3	Lyubov Basova	Ukraine	
4	Maila Andreotti	Italy	
5	Julita Jagodzińska	Poland	

Heat 3

Rank	Name	Nation	Notes
1	Nicky Degrendele	Belgium	Q
2	Sophie Capewell	Great Britain	Q
3	Simona Krupeckaitė	Lithuania	
4	Emma Hinze	Germany	
5	Helena Casas	Spain	
6	Elena Bissolati	Italy	

Heat 4

Rank	Name	Nation	Notes
1	Laurine van Riessen	Netherlands	Q
2	Sandie Clair	France	Q
3	Daria Shmeleva	Russia	
4	Tania Calvo	Spain	
5	Miglė Marozaitė	Lithuania	
6	Olena Starikova	Ukraine	

=== First round repechage ===
The first rider in each heat qualified to the second round.

Heat 1

Rank	Name	Nation	Notes
1	Urszula Łoś	Poland	Q
2	Tania Calvo	Spain	
3	Helena Casas	Spain	

Heat 2

Rank	Name	Nation	Notes
1	Emma Hinze	Germany	Q
2	Lyubov Basova	Ukraine	
3	Julita Jagodzińska	Poland	

Heat 3

Rank	Name	Nation	Notes
1	Olena Starikova	Ukraine	Q
2	Sára Kaňkovská	Czech Republic	
3	Simona Krupeckaitė	Lithuania	
4	Maila Andreotti	Italy	

Heat 4

Rank	Name	Nation	Notes
1	Daria Shmeleva	Russia	Q
2	Robyn Stewart	Ireland	
3	Miglė Marozaitė	Lithuania	
4	Elena Bissolati	Italy	

=== Second round ===
The first three riders in each heat qualified to final 1–6, all other riders advanced to final 7–12.

Heat 1

Rank	Name	Nation	Notes
1	Laurine van Riessen	Netherlands	Q
2	Mathilde Gros	France	Q
3	Daria Shmeleva	Russia	Q
4	Anastasia Voynova	Russia	
5	Sophie Capewell	Great Britain	
6	Urszula Łoś	Poland	

Heat 2

Rank	Name	Nation	Notes
1	Nicky Degrendele	Belgium	Q
2	Katy Marchant	Great Britain	Q
3	Sandie Clair	France	Q
4	Shanne Braspennincx	Netherlands	
5	Emma Hinze	Germany	
6	Olena Starikova	Ukraine	

=== Finals ===
Small final

Rank	Name	Nation	Notes
7	Anastasia Voynova	Russia	
8	Sophie Capewell	Great Britain	
9	Urszula Łoś	Poland	
10	Shanne Braspennincx	Netherlands	
11	Emma Hinze	Germany	
12	Olena Starikova	Ukraine	

Final

Rank	Name	Nation	Notes
1st place, gold medalist(s)	Mathilde Gros	France	
2nd place, silver medalist(s)	Nicky Degrendele	Belgium	
3rd place, bronze medalist(s)	Daria Shmeleva	Russia	
4	Sandie Clair	France	
5	Laurine van Riessen	Netherlands	
6	Katy Marchant	Great Britain	
