= Lisa Küllmer =

German cyclist

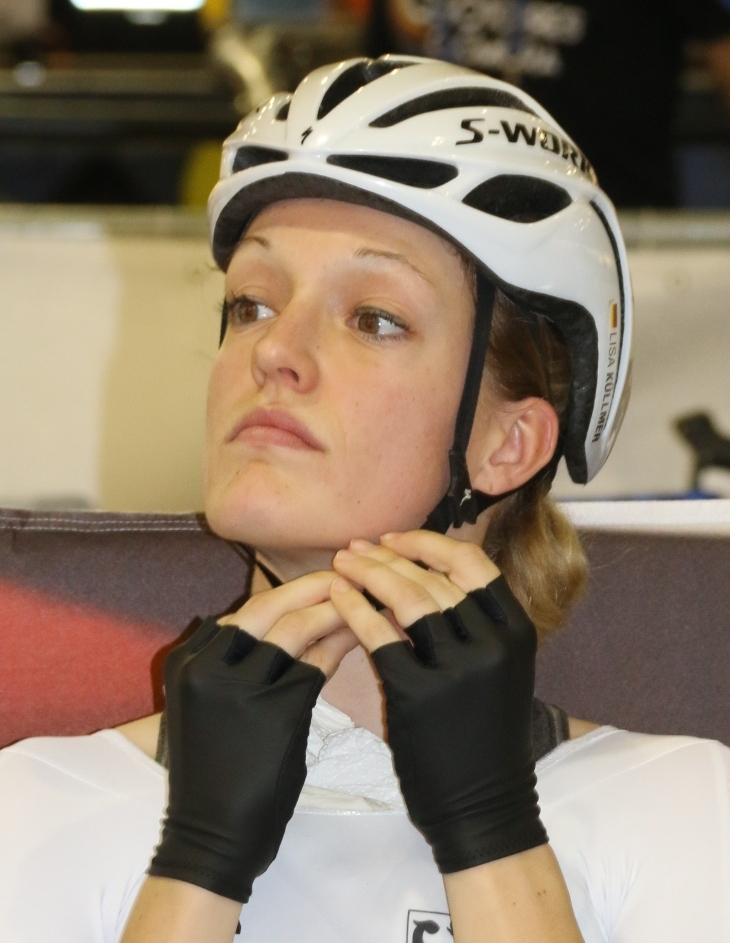

Personal information
- Born: 15 June 1993 (age 33) Frankfurt

Cycling career
- Sport: Cycling
- Discipline: Track cycling
- Role: Rider
- Rider type: team pursuit

Lisa Küllmer (born 15 June 1993 in Frankfurt) is a German female track cyclist. She competed in the team pursuit event at the 2014 UCI Track Cycling World Championships.

== Career results ==
2015
1st Omnium, Cottbuser Nächte
2016
3rd Omnium, 6 giorni delle rose - Fiorenzuola
2017
GP Zürich - Oerlikon

1st Scratch Race
3rd Madison (with Michaela Ebert)

2nd Scratch Race, Öschelbronn
2nd Madison, Oberhausen (with Michaela Ebert)
2nd Scratch Race, Dublin International

== See also ==
- 2014 UCI Track Cycling World Championships – Women's team pursuit
