= Diana Klimova =

Russian cyclist (born 1996)

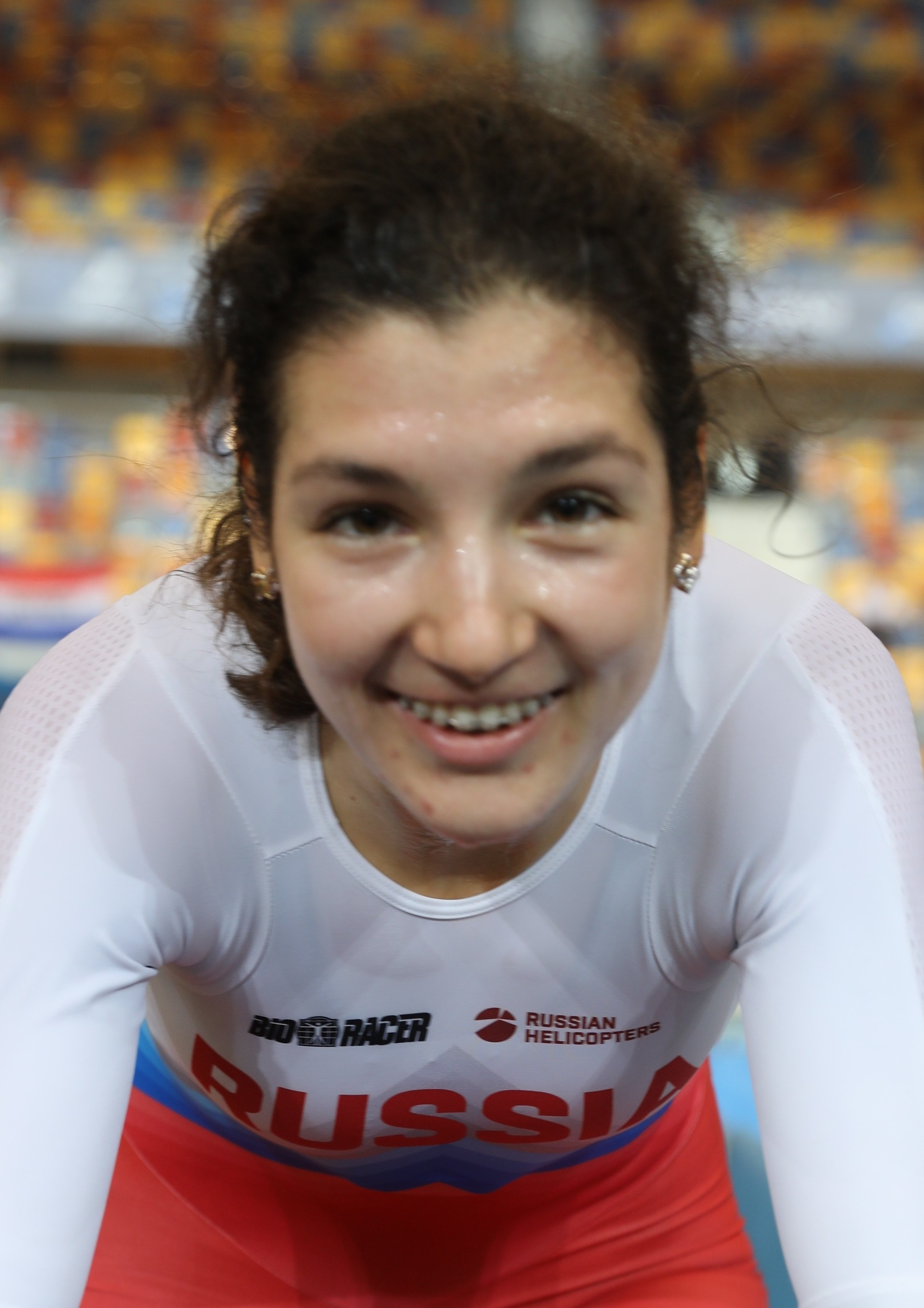
- Klimova in 2019

Personal information
- Full name: Diana Andreyevna Klimova; Russian: Диана Андреевна Климова
- Born: 8 October 1996 (age 30)

Cycling career
- Sport: Cycling
- Current team: Roland Le Dévoluy
- Disciplines: Track; Road
- Role: Rider

Professional team
- 2020–: Cogeas–Mettler–Look

Major wins
- One-day races and Classics National Road Race Championships (2020)
Medal record
European Games
Bronze medal – third place	2019 Minsk	Madison
European Championships
Silver medal – second place	2018 Glasgow	Madison
Silver medal – second place	2020 Plovdiv	Madison
U23 & Junior European Championships
Gold medal – first place	2018 Aigle	U23 Madison
Gold medal – first place	2018 Aigle	U23 Points race
Silver medal – second place	2014 Anadia	Junior Scratch
Silver medal – second place	2017 Sangalhos	U23 Madison
Bronze medal – third place	2014 Anadia	Junior Points race

Diana Andreyevna Klimova (Russian: Диана Андреевна Климова; born 8 October 1996) is a Russian road and track cyclist, who currently rides for UCI Women's Continental Team Roland Le Dévoluy. Representing Russia at international competitions, Klimova won the bronze medal at the 2016–17 UCI Track Cycling World Cup, Round 1 in Glasgow in the madison.

== Major results ==
2017
Grand Prix of Tula

1st Points Race
2nd Omnium

2nd Madison, Grand Prix Minsk (with Maria Petukhova)
2nd Madison, Grand Prix of Moscow (with Maria Petukhova)
2018
International Belgian Track Meeting

3rd Omnium
3rd Scratch Race

4th Gran Premio della Liberazione
10th Overall Giro della Toscana Int. Femminile – Memorial Michela Fanini
2019
4th Overall Giro delle Marche in Rosa
6th Overall Tour of Thailand
10th Grand Prix Alanya
2020
1st Road race, National Road Championships
1st Grand Prix Alanya
7th Grand Prix Gazipaşa
2022
2nd Grand Prix Velo Manavgat
