= 2018 UEC European Track Championships – Women's points race =

Women's points race at the 2018 UEC European Track Championships
- Venue: Sir Chris Hoy Velodrome, Glasgow
- Date: 4 August
- Competitors: 21 from 21 nations
- Winning points: 33

Medalists
gold medal	Maria Giulia Confalonieri	Italy
silver medal	Ina Savenka	Belarus
bronze medal	Gulnaz Badykova	Russia

The women's points race competition at the 2018 UEC European Track Championships was held on 4 August 2018.

== Results ==
100 laps (25 km) were raced with 10 sprints.

Rank	Name	Nation	Lap points	Sprint points	Total points	Finish order
1st place, gold medalist(s)	Maria Giulia Confalonieri	Italy	20	13	33	4
2nd place, silver medalist(s)	Ina Savenka	Belarus	20	12	32	9
3rd place, bronze medalist(s)	Gulnaz Badykova	Russia	20	10	30	5
4	Kirsten Wild	Netherlands		27	27	2
5	Lydia Gurley	Ireland	20	3	23	8
6	Lotte Kopecky	Belgium	20	3	23	16
7	Charlotte Becker	Germany	20	3	23	19
8	Hanna Solovey	Ukraine	20	1	21	15
9	Verena Eberhardt	Austria	20		20	7
10	Jarmila Machačová	Czech Republic	20		20	10
11	Pascale Jeuland	France			19	1
12	Elinor Barker	Great Britain			14	6
13	Amalie Dideriksen	Denmark			8	3
14	Maria Martins	Portugal			5	17
15	Nikol Płosaj	Poland			3	14
16	Tereza Medveďová	Slovakia			0	11
17	Léna Mettraux	Switzerland			0	12
18	Irene Usabiaga	Spain			0	13
19	Ana Maria Covrig	Romania			0	18
	Kristina Kazlauskaitė	Lithuania	–40		–40	DNF
	Sara Ferrara	Finland	–40		–40	DNF
