= 2018 UEC European Track Championships – Women's madison =

Women's madison at the 2018 UEC European Track Championships
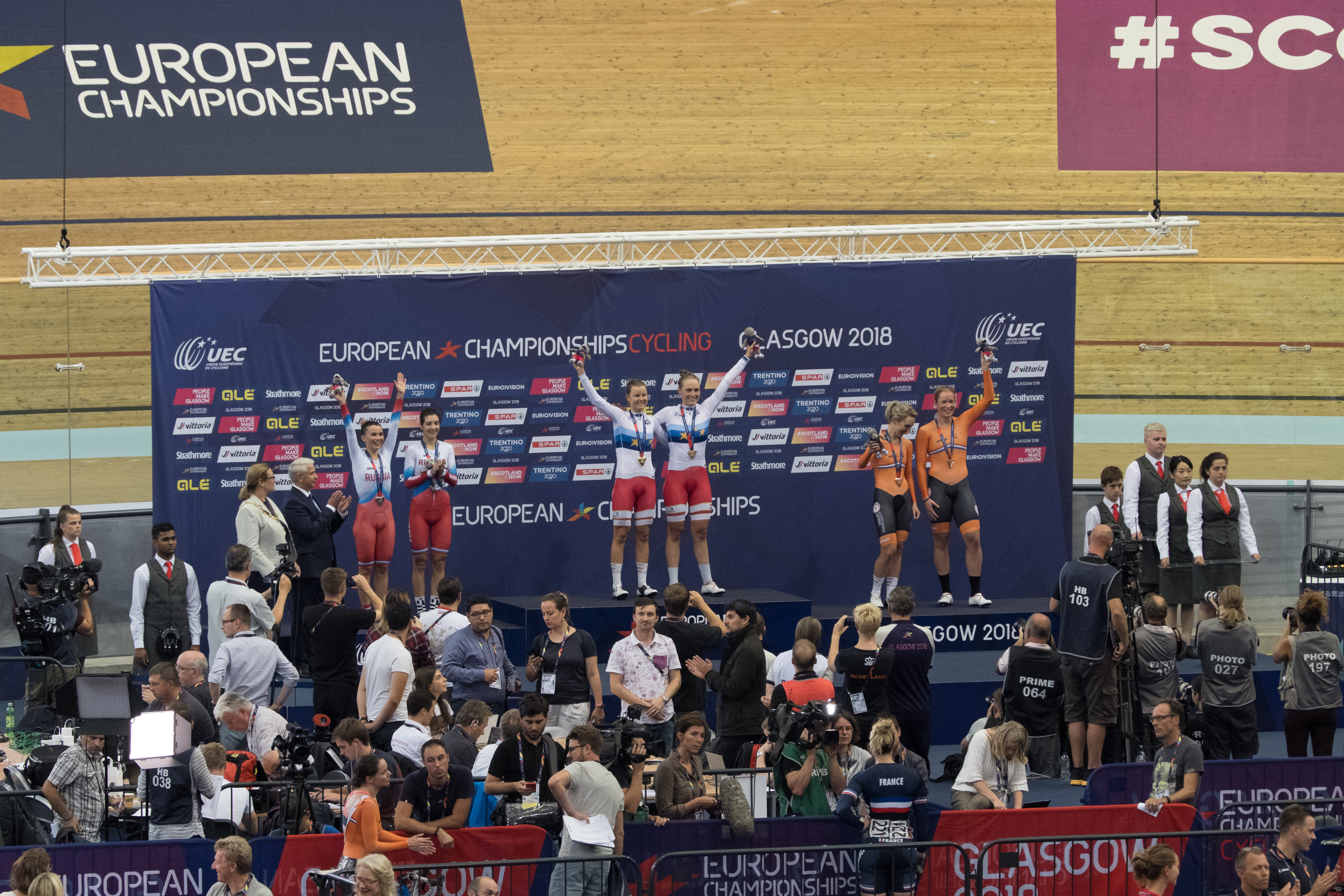
- Podium of the event
- Venue: Sir Chris Hoy Velodrome, Glasgow
- Date: 7 August
- Competitors: 32 from 16 nations
- Winning points: 42

Medalists
gold medal	Amalie Dideriksen; Julie Leth	Denmark
silver medal	Gulnaz Badykova; Diana Klimova	Russia
bronze medal	Kirsten Wild; Amy Pieters	Netherlands

The women's madison competition at the 2018 UEC European Track Championships was held on 7 August 2018.

== Results ==
120 laps (30 km) were raced with 12 sprints.

Rank	Name	Nation	Lap points	Sprint points	Total points	Finish order
1st place, gold medalist(s)	Amalie Dideriksen; Julie Leth	Denmark	20	22	42	11
2nd place, silver medalist(s)	Gulnaz Badykova; Diana Klimova	Russia	20	18	38	1
3rd place, bronze medalist(s)	Kirsten Wild; Amy Pieters	Netherlands		34	34	3
4	Katie Archibald; Laura Kenny	Great Britain		28	28	2
5	Letizia Paternoster; Maria Giulia Confalonieri	Italy		14	14	5
6	Lotte Kopecky; Jolien D'Hoore	Belgium		10	10	14
7	Coralie Demay; Pascale Jeuland	France		7	7	6
8	Lydia Boylan; Lydia Gurley	Ireland		3	3	9
9	Daria Pikulik; Wiktoria Pikulik	Poland		2	2	4
10	Anna Nahirna; Oksana Kliachina	Ukraine		1	1	7
11	Anna Knauer; Lisa Küllmer	Germany			0	8
12	Ina Savenka; Palina Pivavarava	Belarus			0	10
13	Andrea Waldis; Aline Seitz	Switzerland	–40	4	–36	12
14	Lucie Hochmann; Kateřina Kohoutková	Czech Republic	–60		–60	13
15	Ane Iriarte; Eukene Larrarte	Spain	–80		–80	15
	Tereza Medveďová; Alžbeta Bačíková	Slovakia	–40			DNF
