= 2018 UEC European Track Championships – Men's elimination race =

Men's elimination race at the 2018 UEC European Track Championships
- Venue: Sir Chris Hoy Velodrome, Glasgow
- Date: 7 August
- Competitors: 19 from 19 nations

Medalists
gold medal	Matthew Walls	Great Britain
silver medal	Rui Oliveira	Portugal
bronze medal	Szymon Krawczyk	Poland

The men's elimination race competition at the 2018 UEC European Track Championships was held on 7 August 2018.

== Results ==
Rank	Name	Nation
1st place, gold medalist(s)	Matthew Walls	Great Britain
2nd place, silver medalist(s)	Rui Oliveira	Portugal
3rd place, bronze medalist(s)	Szymon Krawczyk	Poland
4	Loïc Perizzolo	Switzerland
5	Volodymyr Dzhus	Ukraine
6	Adrien Garel	France
7	Maximilian Beyer	Germany
8	Moreno De Pauw	Belgium
9	Daniel Babor	Czech Republic
10	Roy Eefting	Netherlands
11	Marc Potts	Ireland
12	Zafeiris Volikakis	Greece
13	Raman Tsishkou	Belarus
14	Julio Amores	Spain
15	Stefan Matzner	Austria
16	Maxim Piskunov	Russia
17	Michele Scartezzini	Italy
18	Tomáš Person	Slovakia
19	Lars Pria	Romania
