= Swimming at the 2018 European Aquatics Championships – Men's 100 metre freestyle =

Men's 100 metre freestyle at the 2018 European Aquatics Championships
- Venue: Tollcross International Swimming Centre
- Dates: 4 August (heats and semifinals); 5 August (final)
- Competitors: 83 from 33 nations
- Winning time: 48.01

Medalists
gold medal	Alessandro Miressi	Italy
silver medal	Duncan Scott	Great Britain
bronze medal	Mehdy Metella	France

The Men's 100 metre freestyle competition of the 2018 European Aquatics Championships was held on 4 and 5 August 2018.

== Records ==
Prior to the competition, the existing world and championship records were as follows.

	Name	Nation	Time	Location	Date
World record	César Cielo	Brazil	46.91	Rome	30 July 2009
European record	Alain Bernard	France	47.12	Rome	29 July 2009
Championship record	Alain Bernard	France	47.50	Eindhoven	22 March 2008

== Results ==
=== Heats ===
The heats were started on 4 August at 09:30.

Rank	Heat	Lane	Name	Nationality	Time	Notes
1	7	6	Vladislav Grinev	Russia	48.38	Q
2	9	5	Alessandro Miressi	Italy	48.53	Q
3	8	3	Danila Izotov	Russia	48.57	Q
4	9	4	Mehdy Metella	France	48.62	Q
5	8	4	Vladimir Morozov	Russia	48.75	
6	7	5	Sergii Shevtsov	Ukraine	48.78	Q
7	7	4	Duncan Scott	Great Britain	48.87	Q
8	4	4	Bruno Blašković	Croatia	48.88	Q
9	8	6	Damian Wierling	Germany	48.93	Q
9	9	3	Nándor Németh	Hungary	48.93	Q
11	5	1	Simonas Bilis	Lithuania	49.00	Q
12	8	5	Dominik Kozma	Hungary	49.11	Q
13	9	6	Luca Dotto	Italy	49.13	Q
14	8	2	Jérémy Stravius	France	49.16	Q
15	8	0	Nyls Korstanje	Netherlands	49.20	Q
16	9	1	Lorenzo Zazzeri	Italy	49.25	
17	8	8	Kyle Stolk	Netherlands	49.27	Q
18	9	2	Velimir Stjepanović	Serbia	49.32	Q
19	7	3	Kacper Majchrzak	Poland	49.33	
20	9	8	Stan Pijnenburg	Netherlands	49.36	
21	9	7	Ivan Kuzmenko	Russia	49.43	
22	6	4	Maxime Grousset	France	49.51	
23	7	9	Christoffer Carlsen	Sweden	49.63	
24	8	7	Richárd Bohus	Hungary	49.71	
25	7	8	Jan Hołub	Poland	49.75	
26	6	8	Andrej Barna	Serbia	49.76	
27	9	9	Mislav Sever	Croatia	49.78	
28	6	2	Markus Lie	Norway	49.79	
29	5	7	Uroš Nikolić	Serbia	49.84	
30	7	0	Jakub Kraska	Poland	49.90	
31	5	4	Odysseus Meladinis	Greece	49.94	
31	5	8	Bernhard Reitshammer	Austria	49.94	
33	6	1	Péter Holoda	Hungary	49.96	
34	6	0	Jasper Aerents	Belgium	49.97	
35	4	7	Niksa Stojkovski	Norway	49.99	
35	7	2	Ivano Vendrame	Italy	49.99	
37	3	4	Craig McLean	Great Britain	50.00	
38	6	3	Valentin Borisavljevic	Belgium	50.02	
38	8	9	Emmanuel Vanluchene	Belgium	50.02	
40	5	6	Alexander Trampitsch	Austria	50.06	
41	3	3	Ivan Lenđer	Serbia	50.17	
42	7	1	David Cumberlidge	Great Britain	50.23	
43	5	3	Isak Eliasson	Sweden	50.27	
44	4	5	Julien Henx	Luxembourg	50.30	
45	5	9	Ziv Kalontarov	Israel	50.33	
46	6	7	Jordan Sloan	Ireland	50.34	
47	6	6	Calum Jarvis	Great Britain	50.37	
48	5	0	Meiron Cheruti	Israel	50.40	
49	6	9	David Gamburg	Israel	50.42	
50	5	2	Viktar Krasochka	Belarus	50.54	
51	6	5	Björn Seeliger	Sweden	50.55	
52	2	7	Daniel Zaitsev	Estonia	50.65	
53	3	2	Povilas Strazdas	Lithuania	50.67	
54	4	1	Robert Powell	Ireland	50.71	
54	4	3	Tomas Sungaila	Lithuania	50.71	
56	4	8	Kemal Arda Gürdal	Turkey	50.73	
57	4	2	Anton Herrala	Finland	50.75	
58	2	4	Doğa Çelik	Turkey	50.80	
59	3	7	Yalım Acımış	Turkey	50.84	
60	3	0	Jan Šefl	Czech Republic	50.88	
61	4	9	Gustaf Dahlman	Sweden	50.93	
62	4	0	Emir Muratović	Bosnia and Herzegovina	50.95	
63	3	5	Teemu Vuorela	Finland	51.04	
64	3	1	İskender Başlakov	Turkey	51.27	
65	3	8	Anton Latkin	Belarus	51.44	
65	3	6	Nikola Miljenić	Croatia	51.44	
67	2	3	Artur Barseghyan	Armenia	51.54	
68	2	1	Georgia Biganishvili	Georgia	51.58	
69	3	9	Nikita Tsernosev	Estonia	51.61	
70	2	5	Andri Aedma	Estonia	51.73	
71	2	0	Teimuraz Kobakhidze	Georgia	51.91	
72	2	6	Marko-Matteus Langel	Estonia	51.95	
73	5	5	Ari-Pekka Liukkonen	Finland	51.96	
74	2	2	Adam Halas	Slovakia	52.09	
75	2	8	Matthew Zammit	Malta	52.45	
76	1	5	Vladimir Mamikonyan	Armenia	53.89	
77	2	9	Matthew Galea	Malta	53.90	
78	1	3	Gianluca Pasolini	San Marino	54.51	
79	1	4	Cristian Santi	San Marino	54.60	
80	1	7	Deni Baholli	Albania	55.60	
81	1	6	Dren Ukimeraj	Kosovo	56.69	
82	1	2	Dijon Kadriju	Kosovo	56.86	
83	1	1	Ruben Gharibyan	Armenia	57.53	
—	1	8	Vahan Mkhitaryan	Armenia	Did not start	
—	4	6	Denis Loktev	Israel	Did not start	
—	7	7	Kristian Golomeev	Greece	Did not start	
—	8	1	Jesse Puts	Netherlands	Did not start	
—	9	0	Konrad Czerniak	Poland	Did not start	

=== Semifinals ===
The semifinals were held on 4 August at 17:24.

==== Semifinal 1 ====
Rank	Lane	Name	Nationality	Time	Notes
1	4	Alessandro Miressi	Italy	48.21	Q
2	5	Mehdy Metella	France	48.41	Q
3	6	Nándor Németh	Hungary	48.58	Q
4	3	Duncan Scott	Great Britain	48.62	Q
5	7	Luca Dotto	Italy	48.76	Q
6	8	Velimir Stjepanović	Serbia	48.93	
7	2	Simonas Bilis	Lithuania	49.08	
8	1	Nyls Korstanje	Netherlands	49.33	

==== Semifinal 2 ====
Rank	Lane	Name	Nationality	Time	Notes
1	4	Vladislav Grinev	Russia	48.58	Q
2	3	Sergii Shevtsov	Ukraine	48.72	Q
3	6	Bruno Blašković	Croatia	48.90	Q
4	5	Danila Izotov	Russia	48.92	
5	2	Damian Wierling	Germany	48.96	
6	7	Dominik Kozma	Hungary	49.15	
6	1	Jérémy Stravius	France	49.15	
8	8	Kyle Stolk	Netherlands	49.32	

=== Final ===
The final was held on 5 August at 17:20.

Rank	Lane	Name	Nationality	Time	Notes
1st place, gold medalist(s)	4	Alessandro Miressi	Italy	48.01	
2nd place, silver medalist(s)	2	Duncan Scott	Great Britain	48.23	
3rd place, bronze medalist(s)	5	Mehdy Metella	France	48.24	
4	3	Vladislav Grinev	Russia	48.36	
5	1	Luca Dotto	Italy	48.45	
6	6	Nándor Németh	Hungary	48.55	
7	7	Sergii Shevtsov	Ukraine	48.74	
8	8	Bruno Blašković	Croatia	49.02	
