= Nicky Degrendele =

Belgian cyclist (born 1996)

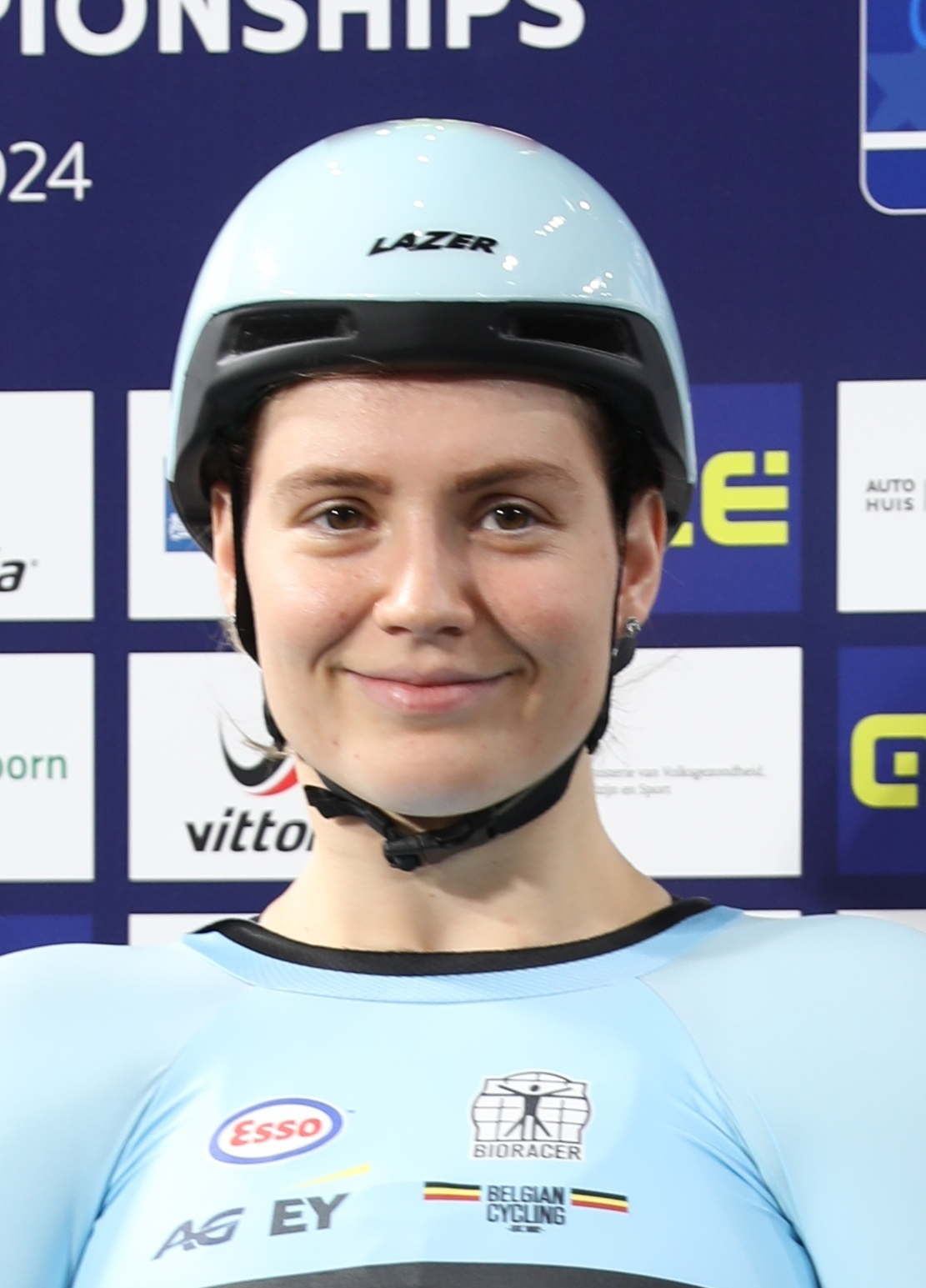
- Degrendele in 2024

Personal information
- Full name: Nicky Degrendele
- Born: 11 October 1996 (age 30) Varsenare, Belgium

Cycling career
- Sport: Cycling
- Disciplines: Track; Road
- Role: Rider
- Rider type: Sprinter

Professional teams
- 2015–2017: Topsport Vlaanderen–Pro-Duo
- 2018–2020: BEAT Cycling Club
Medal record
World Championships
| Gold medal – first place | 2018 Apeldoorn | Keirin |
| Bronze medal – third place | 2017 Hong Kong | Keirin |
European Championships
| Silver medal – second place | 2016 Yvelines | Keirin |
| Silver medal – second place | 2018 Glasgow | Keirin |

Nicky Degrendele (born 11 October 1996) is a Belgian professional track and road cyclist, who most recently rode for UCI Track Team BEAT Cycling Club. Most notably, she became world champion at the age of 21 in Women's Keirin at the 2018 UCI Track Cycling World Championships in Apeldoorn. She formerly rode for the Sport Vlaanderen–Guill D'or team; in October 2018 she joined BEAT Cycling Club.

== Career ==
Degrendele practiced gymnastics until the age of 15 when, due to back problems, she made the switch to road race cycling. 3 races and a broken elbow later, she decided road racing was not for her. After her father took her to ride a couple laps on a track in Ghent, Belgium and attending initiation lessons in October/November 2011 organised by Cycling Vlaanderen, she made the switch to track cycling.

Success came quickly to Degrendele after that, becoming Belgian Champion in the women's sprint in February 2012. In September of that same year, she started at the Topsportschool in Ghent, Belgium as a boarding student. At her first international championship, the 2013 European Track Championships (under-23 & junior) in Anadia, Portugal, she won 3 medals: silver in the women's sprint and keirin, and bronze in the women's team sprint. A month later, in August 2013, at the 2013 UCI Juniors Track World Championships in Glasgow, Scotland, she won silver in the women's sprint.

A year later, Degrendele won her first international title at the 2014 European Track Championships (under-23 & junior), again in Anadia, Portugal, winning gold in the women's keirin. She also win a silver in the women's sprint at the same championships. A couple weeks later, she repeated this performance at the 2014 UCI Juniors Track World Championships in Gwangmyeong, South Korea, becoming world champion in the women's Keirin and finishing 3rd in the women's sprint.

In 2016, the 20 years old Degrendele won silver in the Keirin at both the under-23 European Track Championships and the 2016 UEC European Track Championships for seniors.

2018 saw Degrendele win her first (and so far only) senior world championship title, winning the gold in the Keirin at the 2018 UCI Track Cycling World Championships in Apeldoorn, The Netherlands. Later that year, she took another silver in the Keirin at the 2018 UEC European Track Championships in Glasgow, Scotland. The year ended however on a low point when she crashed hard in November during the French leg of the 2018–19 UCI Track Cycling World Cup in Saint-Quentin-en-Yvelines that caused her severe headaches, balance and concentration problems every day for two and a half months.

Having become world champion Keirin in 2018, what followed were years of mostly disappointments, highlighted by a failure to qualify for the 2020 Summer Olympic Games in Tokyo, Japan. 4 years later, she did qualify for the women's sprint and Keirin events at the 2024 Summer Olympics in Paris, France. At the Olympics, she failed to qualify for the A final in the women's keirin competition, having suffered a bad crash in the quarter-finals, and finished 5th in the B Final and 11th overall. Due to her injuries in that crash in the keirin competition, she did not partake in the women's sprint competition.

Early February 2025, on the first night of the 2025 UEC European Track Championships in Heusden-Zolder, Belgium, Degrendele announced that she was putting her career on hold as she and her partner were expecting a first child.

== Major results ==
2014
European Junior Track Championships

1st Keirin
3rd Sprint

UCI Juniors Track World Championships

1st Keirin
3rd Sprint

Belgian Xmas Meetings

1st Keirin
1st Sprint

1st Sprint, Grand Prix of Poland (U23)
Trofeu Ciutat de Barcelona

2nd Keirin
2nd Sprint

3rd Sprint, International Belgian Open
2015
Revolution – Round 2, Manchester

1st Keirin
1st Sprint

International Belgian Open

1st Keirin
3rd Sprint

3rd Keirin, Grand Prix of Poland
3rd Keirin, Trofeu CAR Anadia Portugal
Belgian Xmas Meetings

3rd Keirin
3rd Sprint

2016
1st Sprint, Track-Cycling Challenge Grenchen
Prova Internacional de Anadia

2nd Keirin
2nd Sprint

2nd Keirin, 6 giorni delle rose – Fiorenzuola
2nd Keirin, Grand Prix of Poland
3rd Keirin, Fenioux Piste International
2nd Keirin, UEC European U23 Championships
2nd Keirin, UEC European Track Championships
2017
National Track Championships

1st 500m time trial
1st Keirin

1st Keirin, Troféu Internacional de Anadia
2nd Keirin, Belgian International Track Meeting
3rd Keirin, UCI World Track Championships
3rd Sprint – Minsk, UCI Track World Cup
Fenioux Piste International

3rd Sprint
3rd Keirin

2018
1st Keirin, UCI Track Cycling World Championships
UEC European Under-23 Track Championships

1st Keirin
3rd Sprint

International Belgian Track Meeting

1st Keirin
1st Sprint

2nd Keirin, UEC European Track Championships
2022
National Track Championships

1st Keirin

== See also ==
- List of 2015 UCI Women's Teams and riders
