= 2018 UEC European Track Championships =

- Venue: Glasgow, Scotland
- Date(s): 2–7 August
- Velodrome: Sir Chris Hoy Velodrome
- Events: 22 (11 women, 11 men)

The 2018 UEC European Track Championships was the ninth edition of the elite UEC European Track Championships in track cycling and took place at the Sir Chris Hoy Velodrome in Glasgow, Scotland, from 2 to 7 August 2018. The event was organised by the European Cycling Union. All European champions were awarded the UEC European Champion jersey which may be worn by the champion throughout the year when competing in the same event at other competitions.

The Championships formed part of both the inaugural European Cycling Championships bringing together track, road, mountain bike and BMX events, and the inaugural multi-sport 2018 European Championships bringing together seven different sports.

The 12 Olympic events (sprint, team sprint, team pursuit, keirin, madison and omnium for men and women), as well as 10 other events were on the program for these European Championships.

The Netherlands led the medal table with five golds, while Germany won the most medals with 11. Hosts Great Britain came second in both golds and medals. Russian sprinter Daria Shmeleva was the most successful individual athlete with three gold medals, while Great Britain's Laura Kenny set a new record for career European Championship titles with her eleventh and twelfth gold medals.

== Schedule ==
Competition	F	Final

Men
Date →	Thu 2	Fri 3		Sat 4			Sun 5		Mon 6		Tue 7
Event ↓	E	A	E	M	A	E	M	E	A	E	M
Sprint							Q,^{1}/_{16},^{1}/_{8}		QF, SF	F	
Team sprint		Q, R1	F								
Team pursuit	Q	R1	F								
Keirin											R1, R, R2, F
Omnium					SR, TR	ER, PR					
Madison									Q, F		
1 km time trial				Q	F						
Pursuit							Q	F			
Points race								F			
Scratch			F								
Elimination race											F

Women
Date →	Thu 2	Fri 3		Sat 4			Sun 5		Mon 6		Tue 7
Event ↓	E	A	E	M	A	E	M	E	A	E	M
Sprint				Q	^{1}/_{16},^{1}/_{8}	QF		SF, F			
Team sprint		Q, R1	F								
Team pursuit	Q	R1	F								
Keirin											R1, R, R2, F
Omnium									SR, TR	ER, PR	
Madison											F
500 m time trial									Q	F	
Pursuit				Q		F					
Points race					F						
Scratch		F									
Elimination race							F				

M = Morning session, A = Afternoon session, E = Evening session
Q = qualifiers, R1 = first round, R2 = second round, R = repechages, ^{1}/_{16} = sixteenth finals, ^{1}/_{8} = eighth finals, QF = quarterfinals, SF = semifinals,
SR = Scratch Race, TR = Tempo Race, ER = Elimination Race, PR = Points Race

== Events ==
Event	Gold		Silver		Bronze	
Men's Events
Sprint	Jeffrey Hoogland; Netherlands		Stefan Bötticher; Germany		Harrie Lavreysen; Netherlands	
Team Sprint	Netherlands; Jeffrey Hoogland; Harrie Lavreysen; Roy van den Berg; Nils van 't Hoenderdaal	42.888	France; Sébastien Vigier; François Pervis; Quentin Lafargue; Michaël D'Almeida	43.693	Germany; Stefan Bötticher; Timo Bichler; Joachim Eilers	43.805
Team Pursuit	Italy; Filippo Ganna; Francesco Lamon; Elia Viviani; Michele Scartezzini; Liam Bertazzo	3:55.401	Switzerland; Cyrille Thièry; Stefan Bissegger; Frank Pasche; Théry Schir; Claudio Imhof	3:59.705	Great Britain; Ethan Hayter; Steven Burke; Kian Emadi; Charlie Tanfield; Oliver Wood	3:57.463
Keirin	Stefan Bötticher; Germany		Sébastien Vigier; France		Jack Carlin; Great Britain	
Omnium	Ethan Hayter; Great Britain	133	Elia Viviani; Italy	113	Casper Von Folsach; Denmark	113
Madison	Belgium; Robbe Ghys; Kenny De Ketele	60	Germany; Theo Reinhardt; Roger Kluge	49	Great Britain; Oliver Wood; Ethan Hayter	38
1 km Time Trial^{[N]}	Matthijs Büchli; Netherlands	1:00.134	Joachim Eilers; Germany	1:00.361	Sam Ligtlee; Netherlands	1:00.905
Pursuit^{[N]}	Domenic Weinstein; Germany	4:13.363	Ivo Oliveira; Portugal	4:15.304	Claudio Imhof; Switzerland	4:16.654
Points Race^{[O]}	Wojciech Pszczolarski; Poland	102	Kenny De Ketele; Belgium	83	Stefan Matzner; Austria	71
Scratch Race^{[O]}	Roman Gladysh; Ukraine		Adrien Garel; France		Tristan Marguet; Switzerland	
Elimination Race^{[O]}	Matthew Walls; Great Britain		Rui Oliveira; Portugal		Szymon Krawczyk; Poland	
Women's Events
Sprint	Daria Shmeleva; Russia		Anastasiia Voynova; Russia		Mathilde Gros; France	
Team Sprint	Russia; Anastasiia Voynova; Daria Shmeleva	32.452	Ukraine; Liubov Basova; Olena Starikova	33.108	Germany; Miriam Welte; Emma Hinze	32.981
Team Pursuit	Great Britain; Elinor Barker; Laura Kenny; Katie Archibald; Neah Evans; Eleanor Dickinson	4:16.896	Italy; Letizia Paternoster; Marta Cavalli; Elisa Balsamo; Silvia Valsecchi	4:25.384	Germany; Charlotte Becker; Gudrun Stock; Mieke Kröger; Lisa Brennauer	4:23.105
Keirin	Mathilde Gros; France		Nicky Degrendele; Belgium		Daria Shmeleva; Russia	
Omnium	Kirsten Wild; Netherlands	156	Katie Archibald; Great Britain	144	Letizia Paternoster; Italy	111
Madison	Denmark; Julie Leth; Amalie Dideriksen	42	Russia; Gulnaz Badykova; Diana Klimova	38	Netherlands; Kirsten Wild; Amy Pieters	34
500m Time Trial^{[N]}	Daria Shmeleva; Russia	33.285	Olena Starikova; Ukraine	33.593	Miriam Welte; Germany	33.600
Pursuit^{[N]}	Lisa Brennauer; Germany	3:26.879	Katie Archibald; Great Britain	3:29.577	Justyna Kaczkowska; Poland	3:34.750
Points Race^{[O]}	Maria Giulia Confalonieri; Italy	33	Ina Savenka; Belarus	32	Gulnaz Badykova; Russia	30
Scratch Race^{[O]}	Kirsten Wild; Netherlands		Emily Kay; Great Britain		Jolien D'Hoore; Belgium	
Elimination Race^{[O]}	Laura Kenny; Great Britain		Anna Knauer; Germany		Evgenia Augustinas; Russia	

=== Notes ===
- Competitors named in italics only participated in rounds prior to the final.
- ^{^{N}} These events are not contested in the Olympics.
- ^{^{O}} In the Olympics, these events are contested within the omnium only.

== Medal table ==
The host country is highlighted in lavender blue

Rank	Nation	Gold	Silver	Bronze	Total
1	Netherlands (NED)	5	0	3	8
2	Great Britain (GBR)*	4	3	3	10
3	Germany (GER)	3	4	4	11
4	Russia (RUS)	3	2	3	8
5	Italy (ITA)	2	2	1	5
6	France (FRA)	1	3	1	5
7	Belgium (BEL)	1	2	1	4
8	Ukraine (UKR)	1	2	0	3
9	Poland (POL)	1	0	2	3
10	Denmark (DEN)	1	0	1	2
11	Portugal (POR)	0	2	0	2
12	Switzerland (SUI)	0	1	2	3
13	Belarus (BLR)	0	1	0	1
14	Austria (AUT)	0	0	1	1
Totals (14 entries)		22	22	22	66

== See also ==
- 2018 UEC European Track Championships (under-23 & junior)
