= Swimming at the 2018 European Aquatics Championships – Women's 400 metre freestyle =

Women's 400 metre freestyle at the 2018 European Aquatics Championships
- Venue: Tollcross International Swimming Centre
- Dates: 9 August
- Competitors: 32 from 19 nations
- Winning time: 4:03.35

Medalists
gold medal	Simona Quadarella	Italy
silver medal	Ajna Késely	Hungary
bronze medal	Holly Hibbott	Great Britain

The Women's 400 metre freestyle competition of the 2018 European Aquatics Championships was held on 9 August 2018.

== Records ==
Prior to the competition, the existing world and championship records were as follows.

	Name	Nation	Time	Location	Date
World record	Katie Ledecky	United States	3:56.46	Rio de Janeiro	7 August 2016
European record	Federica Pellegrini	Italy	3:59.15	Rome	26 July 2009
Championship record	Federica Pellegrini	Italy	4:01.53	Eindhoven	24 March 2008

== Results ==
=== Heats ===
The heats were started at 09:24.

Rank	Heat	Lane	Name	Nationality	Time	Notes
1	3	5	Ajna Késely	Hungary	4:08.77	Q
2	4	5	Holly Hibbott	Great Britain	4:09.41	Q
3	4	4	Sarah Köhler	Germany	4:09.85	Q
4	4	3	Simona Quadarella	Italy	4:09.97	Q
5	4	6	Anna Egorova	Russia	4:10.77	Q
6	4	7	Julia Hassler	Liechtenstein	4:12.03	Q
7	4	2	Diana Durães	Portugal	4:12.16	Q
8	3	3	Eleanor Faulkner	Great Britain	4:12.85	Q
9	3	6	Stefania Pirozzi	Italy	4:13.94	
10	3	4	Boglárka Kapás	Hungary	4:14.23	
11	4	8	Barbora Závadová	Czech Republic	4:14.54	
12	4	9	Helena Bach	Denmark	4:15.71	
13	2	7	Irina Krivonogova	Russia	4:16.06	
14	3	7	Valentine Dumont	Belgium	4:16.75	
15	2	6	Laura Jensen	Denmark	4:16.92	
16	2	4	Beril Böcekler	Turkey	4:17.29	
17	2	3	Monique Olivier	Luxembourg	4:18.31	
18	3	8	Sara Račnik	Slovenia	4:19.17	
19	3	9	Tamila Holub	Portugal	4:19.70	
20	3	2	Isabel Gose	Germany	4:20.12	
21	2	2	Maria Grandt	Denmark	4:21.02	
22	2	8	Aleksandra Polańska	Poland	4:22.02	
23	4	1	Katja Fain	Slovenia	4:22.27	
24	3	1	Marlene Kahler	Austria	4:23.70	
25	2	5	Camille Bouden	Belgium	4:25.26	
26	4	0	Hanna Eriksson	Sweden	4:25.43	
27	2	1	Arianna Valloni	San Marino	4:25.57	
28	3	0	Aleksandra Knop	Poland	4:27.09	
29	1	3	Daniela Georges	Poland	4:27.15	
30	1	4	Fatima Alkaramova	Azerbaijan	4:27.46	
31	1	5	Ieva Maļuka	Latvia	4:29.42	

=== Final ===
The final was started at 17:50.

Rank	Lane	Name	Nationality	Time	Notes
1st place, gold medalist(s)	6	Simona Quadarella	Italy	4:03.35	
2nd place, silver medalist(s)	5	Ajna Késely	Hungary	4:03.57	EJ
3rd place, bronze medalist(s)	4	Holly Hibbott	Great Britain	4:05.01	
4	2	Anna Egorova	Russia	4:06.03	NR
5	3	Sarah Köhler	Germany	4:07.68	
6	7	Julia Hassler	Liechtenstein	4:11.42	
7	1	Diana Durães	Portugal	4:12.41	
8	8	Eleanor Faulkner	Great Britain	4:15.26	
