= 2018 UEC European Track Championships – Women's elimination race =

Fourth edition of the Women's elimination cycling race

Women's elimination race at the 2018 UEC European Track Championships
- Venue: Sir Chris Hoy Velodrome, Glasgow
- Date: 5 August
- Competitors: 19 from 19 nations

Medalists
gold medal	Laura Kenny	Great Britain
silver medal	Anna Knauer	Germany
bronze medal	Evgenia Augustinas	Russia

The women's elimination race competition at the 2018 UEC European Track Championships was held on 5 August 2018.

== Results ==
Rank	Name	Nation
1st place, gold medalist(s)	Laura Kenny	Great Britain
2nd place, silver medalist(s)	Anna Knauer	Germany
3rd place, bronze medalist(s)	Evgenia Augustinas	Russia
4	Amy Pieters	Netherlands
5	Elisa Balsamo	Italy
6	Maria Martins	Portugal
7	Shannon McCurley	Ireland
8	Clara Copponi	France
9	Irene Usabiaga	Spain
10	Trine Schmidt	Denmark
11	Aline Seitz	Switzerland
12	Tetyana Klimchenko	Ukraine
13	Alžbeta Bačíková	Slovakia
14	Polina Pivovarova	Belarus
15	Lucie Hochmann	Czech Republic
16	Kristina Kazlauskaitė	Lithuania
17	Łucja Pietrzak	Poland
18	Sara Ferrara	Finland
19	Gilke Croket	Belgium
