= Cycling at the 2019 European Games – Women's team pursuit =

Women's team pursuit at the 2019 European Games
- Venue: Minsk Velodrome
- Dates: 27–28 June
- Competitors: 28 from 7 nations
- Winning time: 4:18.695

Medalists
| gold medal | Elisa Balsamo; Martina Alzini; Marta Cavalli; Letizia Paternoster | Italy |
| silver medal | Jessica Roberts; Megan Barker; Jennifer Holl; Josie Knight | Great Britain |
| bronze medal | Katarzyna Pawłowska; Justyna Kaczkowska; Karolina Karasiewicz; Nikol Płosaj | Poland |

The women's cycling team pursuit at the 2019 European Games was held at the Minsk Velodrome on 27 and 28 June 2019.

== Results ==
=== Qualifying ===
| Rank | Nation | Time | Behind | Notes |
|---|---|---|---|---|
| 1 | Italy; Elisa Balsamo; Martina Alzini; Marta Cavalli; Letizia Paternoster | 4:20.108 | | Q |
| 2 | Great Britain; Jessica Roberts; Megan Barker; Jennifer Holl; Josie Knight | 4:22.865 | +2.757 | Q |
| 3 | Poland; Katarzyna Pawłowska; Justyna Kaczkowska; Karolina Karasiewicz; Nikol Płosaj | 4:26.825 | +6.717 | Q |
| 4 | Belarus; Polina Pivovarova; Aksana Salauyeva; Ina Savenka; Karalina Savenka | 4:29.469 | +9.361 | Q |
| 5 | Ireland; Shannon McCurley; Mia Griffin; Lydia Gurley; Orla Walsh | 4:31.358 | +11.250 | q |
| 6 | Ukraine; Yuliia Biriukova; Oksana Kliachina; Anna Nahirna; Hanna Solovey | 4:34.050 | +13.942 | q |
| 7 | Russia; Evgenia Augustinas; Gulnaz Badykova; Tamara Dronova; Diana Klimova | 4:34.492 | +14.384 | q |

=== First round ===
First round heats were held as follows:
Heat 1: 7th fastest alone
Heat 2: 5th v 6th fastest
Heat 3: 2nd v 3rd fastest
Heat 4: 1st v 4th fastest

The winners of heats 3 and 4 proceeded to the gold medal race. The remaining five teams were ranked on time, from which the top two proceeded to the bronze medal race.

| Heat | Rank | Nation | Time | Notes |
|---|---|---|---|---|
| 1 | 1 | Russia; Evgenia Augustinas; Gulnaz Badykova; Tamara Dronova; Diana Klimova | 4:41.719 | |
| 2 | 1 | Ireland; Shannon McCurley; Mia Griffin; Lydia Gurley; Orla Walsh | 4:30.118 | |
| 2 | 2 | Ukraine; Yuliia Biriukova; Oksana Kliachina; Anna Nahirna; Hanna Solovey | 4:35.059 | |
| 3 | 1 | Great Britain; Jessica Roberts; Megan Barker; Jennifer Holl; Josie Knight | 4:21.023 | QG |
| 3 | 2 | Poland; Katarzyna Pawłowska; Justyna Kaczkowska; Karolina Karasiewicz; Nikol Płosaj | 4:26.867 | QB |
| 4 | 1 | Italy; Elisa Balsamo; Martina Alzini; Marta Cavalli; Letizia Paternoster | 4:23.725 | QG |
| 4 | 2 | Belarus; Polina Pivovarova; Aksana Salauyeva; Ina Savenka; Karalina Savenka | 4:26.842 | QB |

=== Finals ===
| Rank | Nation | Time | Behind | Notes |
|---|---|---|---|---|
Gold medal final
| 1st place, gold medalist(s) | Italy; Elisa Balsamo; Martina Alzini; Marta Cavalli; Letizia Paternoster | 4:18.695 | | |
| 2nd place, silver medalist(s) | Great Britain; Jessica Roberts; Megan Barker; Jennifer Holl; Josie Knight | 4:21.173 | +2.478 | |
Bronze medal final
| 3rd place, bronze medalist(s) | Poland; Katarzyna Pawłowska; Justyna Kaczkowska; Karolina Karasiewicz; Nikol Płosaj | 4:25.906 | | |
| 4 | Belarus; Polina Pivovarova; Aksana Salauyeva; Ina Savenka; Karalina Savenka | 4:29.062 | +3.156 | |
