= 2021 in women's road cycling =

2021 in women's road cycling is about the 2021 women's bicycle races ruled by the UCI and the 2021 UCI Women's Teams.

== Olympic Games ==
Championships	Race	Date	Winner	Time	Second	Time	Third	Time
2020 Olympic Games; Japan	Road race	25 July	Anna Kiesenhofer; Austria	3:52:45	Annemiek van Vleuten; Netherlands	3:54:00 +1:15	Elisa Longo Borghini; Italy	3:54:14 +1:29
2020 Olympic Games; Japan	Individual time trial	28 July	Annemiek van Vleuten; Netherlands	30:13	Marlen Reusser; Switzerland	+0:56	Anna van der Breggen; Netherlands	+1:02

== World Championships ==
Championships	Race	Winner	Second	Third
UCI Road World Championships; Belgium September 20–26 (2021 summary)	Road race	Elisa Balsamo (ITA)	Marianne Vos (NED)	Katarzyna Niewiadoma (POL)
UCI Road World Championships; Belgium September 20–26 (2021 summary)	Individual time trial	Ellen van Dijk (NED)	Marlen Reusser (SUI)	Annemiek van Vleuten (NED)
UCI Road World Championships; Belgium September 20–26 (2021 summary)	Road race (Junior)	Zoe Bäckstedt (GBR)	Kaia Schmid (USA)	Linda Riedmann (GER)
UCI Road World Championships; Belgium September 20–26 (2021 summary)	Individual time trial (Junior)	Alena Ivanchenko (RUS)	Zoe Bäckstedt (GBR)	Antonia Niedermaier (GER)
UCI Road World Championships; Belgium September 20–26 (2021 summary)	Mixed Time Trial	Germany (GER); Lisa Klein; Nikias Arndt; Max Walscheid; Lisa Brennauer; Mieke Kröger; Tony Martin	Netherlands (NED); Ellen van Dijk; Koen Bouwman; Jos van Emden; Annemiek van Vleuten; Riejanne Markus; Bauke Mollema	Italy (ITA); Elena Cecchini; Edoardo Affini; Matteo Sobrero; Marta Cavalli; Elisa Longo Borghini; Filippo Ganna

== Single day races (1.Pro, 1.1 and 1.2) ==
Race	Date	Cat. †	Winner	Second	Third	Ref
(New Zealand) Gravel and Tar	January 23	1.2	Olivia Ray (NZL)	Sharlotte Lucas (NZL)	Rylee Mcmullen (NZL)	
(Turkey) Grand Prix Velo Manavgat	February 20	1.2	Tatsiana Sharakova (BLR)	Anastasiya Kolesava (BLR)	Hanna Tserakh (BLR)	
(Turkey) Grand Prix Velo Alanya	February 21	1.2	Alena Ivanchenko (RUS)	Yanina Kuskova (UZB)	Maria Novolodskaya (RUS)	
(Belgium) Omloop Het Nieuwsblad	February 27	1.Pro	Anna van der Breggen (NED)	Emma Norsgaard Jørgensen (DEN)	Amy Pieters (NED)	
(Belgium) Le Samyn des Dames	March 2	1.1	Lotte Kopecky (BEL)	Emma Norsgaard Jørgensen (DEN)	Chloe Hosking (AUS)	
(Turkey) Grand Prix Mediterrennean	March 6	1.2	Hanna Tserakh (BLR)	Tatsiana Sharakova (BLR)	Tamara Dronova (RUS)	
(Turkey) Grand Prix Gündoğmuş	March 7	1.2	Alena Ivanchenko (RUS)	Olga Zabelinskaya (UZB)	Maria Novolodskaya (RUS)	
(Belgium) GP Oetingen	March 10	1.1	Elisa Balsamo (ITA)	Jolien D'Hoore (BEL)	Marianne Vos (NED)	
(Belgium) Danilith Nokere Koerse	March 17	1.Pro	Amy Pieters (NED)	Grace Brown (AUS)	Lisa Klein (GER)	
(Belgium) Omloop van de Westhoek	March 21	1.1	Christine Majerus (LUX)	Amy Pieters (NED)	Thalita de Jong (NED)	
(Belgium) Dwars door Vlaanderen	March 31	1.1	Annemiek van Vleuten (NED)	Katarzyna Niewiadoma (POL)	Alexis Ryan (USA)	
(Belgium) Ronde de Mouscron	April 5	1.1	Chiara Consonni (ITA)	Jelena Erić (SRB)	Maria Martins (POR)	
(Belgium) Scheldeprijs	April 7	1.1	Lorena Wiebes (NED)	Emma Norsgaard Jørgensen (DEN)	Elisa Balsamo (ITA)	
(Belgium) Brabantse Pijl	April 14	1.1	Ruth Winder (USA)	Demi Vollering (NED)	Elisa Balsamo (ITA)	
(France) Grand Prix Féminin de Chambéry	April 18	1.2	Gladys Verhulst (FRA)	Giorgia Bariani (ITA)	Debora Silvestri (ITA)	
(Spain) Vuelta a la Comunitat Valenciana Feminas	April 18	1.1	Chiara Consonni (ITA)	Barbara Guarischi (ITA)	Élodie Le Bail (FRA)	
(Belgium) GP Eco-Struct	May 8	1.2	Lorena Wiebes (NED)	Susanne Andersen (NOR)	Amber van der Hulst (NED)	
(Spain) Emakumeen Nafarroako	May 13	1.1	Annemiek van Vleuten (NED)	Demi Vollering (NED)	Elisa Longo Borghini (ITA)	
(Spain) Navarra Women's Elite Classics	May 14	1.1	Arlenis Sierra (CUB)	Ruth Winder (USA)	Annemiek van Vleuten (NED)	
(Spain) Gran Premio Ciudad de Eibar	May 16	1.1	Anna van der Breggen (NED)	Annemiek van Vleuten (NED)	Elisa Longo Borghini (ITA)	
(Spain) Emakumeen Saria	May 18	1.1	Anna van der Breggen (NED)	Annemiek van Vleuten (NED)	Cecilie Uttrup Ludwig (DEN)	
(Belgium) Dwars door het Hageland	June 5	1.2	Chantal van den Broek-Blaak (NED)	Christine Majerus (LUX)	Lorena Wiebes (NED)	
(Belgium) Dwars door de Westhoek	June 6	1.1	Lorena Wiebes (NED)	Jolien D'Hoore (BEL)	Barbara Guarischi (ITA)	
(Belgium) SPAR Flanders Diamond Tour	June 13	1.1	Lorena Wiebes (NED)	Chiara Consonni (ITA)	Amber van der Hulst (NED)	
(Turkey) Germenica Grand Prix Road Race	July 3	1.1	Olga Zabelinskaya (UZB)	Tamara Dronova (RUS)	Olga Shekel (UKR)	
(Belgium) 2 Districtenpijl - Ekeren-Deurne	July 4	1.2	Amber van der Hulst (NED)	Arianna Pruisscher (NED)	Shari Bossuyt (BEL)	
(Turkey) Kahramanmaraş Grand Prix Road Race	July 4	1.2	Anastasia Chursina (RUS)	Olena Sharha (UKR)	Olga Shekel (UKR)	
(Turkey) Grand Prix Erciyes - Mimar Sinan	July 10	1.2	Tamara Dronova (RUS)	Tatiana Antoshina (RUS)	Tetiana Yashchenko (UKR)	
(Turkey) Grand Prix Kayseri	July 11	1.2	Olga Zabelinskaya (UZB)	Tatiana Antoshina (RUS)	Yevheniya Vysotska (UKR)	
(Turkey) Grand Prix Velo Erciyes	July 17	1.2	Olga Shekel (UKR)	Margarita Syradoeva (RUS)	Olena Sharha (UKR)	
(Turkey) Grand Prix Develi	July 18	1.2	Tatiana Antoshina (RUS)	Margarita Syradoeva (RUS)	Marina Varenyk (UKR)	
(Dominican Republic) Road Elite Caribbean Championships	August 12	1.2	Juana Fernández (DOM)	Kaya Cattouse (BLZ)	Caitlin Conyers (BER)	
(Dominican Republic) Road Elite Caribbean Championships	August 13	1.2	Aylena de las Mercedes Quevedo (CUB)	Flor Espiritusanto Estévez (DOM)	Lori Sharpe (JAM)	
(France) La Périgord Ladies	August 14	1.2	Marta Bastianelli (ITA)	Erica Magnaldi (ITA)	Nadia Quagliotto (ITA)	
(France) La Picto - Charentaise	August 15	1.2	Marta Lach (POL)	Marta Bastianelli (ITA)	Laura Asencio (FRA)	
(El Salvador) Elite Road Central American Championships	September 3	1.2	Evelyn García (SLV)	Milagro Mena (CRC)	Jennifer Morales (CRC)	
(El Salvador) Elite Road Central American Championships	September 5	1.2	Milagro Mena (CRC)	María José Vargas (CRC)	Evelyn García (SLV)	
(France) La Choralis Fourmies Féminine	September 12	1.2	Pfeiffer Georgi (GBR)	Rachel Neylan (AUS)	Silvia Zanardi (ITA)	
(France) Grand Prix International d'Isbergues	September 19	1.2	Charlotte Kool (NED)	Elisa Balsamo (ITA)	Amber van der Hulst (NED)	
(Italy) Giro dell'Emilia Internazionale Donne Elite	October 2	1.Pro	Mavi García (ESP)	Arlenis Sierra (CUB)	Rachel Neylan (AUS)	
(Belgium) Grote prijs Beerens	October 3	1.2	Thalita de Jong (NED)	Christina Schweinberger (AUT)	Claire Faber (LUX)	
(Belgium) Binche Chimay Binche pour Dames	October 5	1.2	Sara Van de Vel (BEL)	Loes Adegeest (NED)	Nicole Steigenga (NED)	
(Italy) Tre Valli Varesine	October 5	1.2	Arlenis Sierra (CUB)	Mavi García (ESP)	Rachel Neylan (AUS)	
(France) La Classique Morbihan	October 15	1.1	Sofia Bertizzolo (ITA)	Valentine Fortin (FRA)	Chiara Consonni (ITA)	
(France) Grand Prix de Plumelec-Morbihan Dames	October 16	1.1	Chiara Consonni (ITA)	Charlotte Kool (NED)	Silvia Zanardi (ITA)	
(France) Chrono des Nations	October 17	1.1	Marlen Reusser (SUI)	Anna Kiesenhofer (AUT)	Mieke Kröger (GER)	
(Netherlands) Drentse Acht van Westerveld	October 22	1.2	Chantal van den Broek-Blaak (NED)	Charlotte Kool (NED)	Eleonora Gasparrini (ITA)	

== Stage races (2.Pro, 2.1 and 2.2) ==
Race	Date	Cat. †	Winner	Second	Third	Ref
(Netherlands) Healthy Ageing Tour	March 10–12	2.1	Ellen van Dijk (NED)	Lisa Brennauer (GER)	Emma Norsgaard Jørgensen (DEN)	
(Luxembourg) Festival Elsy Jacobs	April 30–May 2	2.Pro	Emma Norsgaard Jørgensen (DEN)	Leah Kirchmann (CAN)	Maria Giulia Confalonieri (ITA)	
(Spain) Setmana Ciclista Valenciana	May 6–May 9	2.1	Annemiek van Vleuten (NED)	Mavi García (ESP)	Katrine Aalerud (NOR)	
(Germany) Internationale Thüringen Ladies Tour	May 25–30	2.Pro	Lucinda Brand (NED)	Lotte Kopecky (BEL)	Emma Norsgaard Jørgensen (DEN)	
(Switzerland) Tour de Suisse Women	June 5–6	2.1	Lizzie Deignan (GBR)	Elise Chabbey (SUI)	Marlen Reusser (SUI)	
Vuelta Internacional Femenina a Guatemala	June 9–13	2.2	Lorena Colmenares (COL)	Miryan Nuñez (ECU)	Liliana Moreno (COL)	
(Serbia) Belgrade GP Woman Tour	June 12–13	2.2	Agnieszka Skalniak-Sójka (POL)	Dominika Włodarczyk (POL)	Łucja Pietrzak (POL)	
Lotto Belgium Tour	June 23–25	2.1	Lotte Kopecky (BEL)	Ellen van Dijk (NED)	Lorena Wiebes (NED)	
(Italy) Giro Rosa	July 2–11	2.Pro	Anna van der Breggen (NED)	Ashleigh Moolman (RSA)	Demi Vollering (NED)	
(Belgium) Baloise Ladies Tour	July 8–11	2.1	Lisa Klein (GER)	Mieke Kröger (GER)	Anna Henderson (GBR)	
(Czech Republic) Tour de Feminin	July 8–11	2.2	Joscelin Lowden (GBR)	Morgane Coston (FRA)	Corinna Lechner (GER)	
(France) Tour de Belle Isle en Terre–Kreiz Breizh Elites Dames	July 29–30	2.2	Anna Henderson (GBR)	Floortje Mackaij (NED)	Anouska Koster (NED)	
(United States) Joe Martin Stage Race	August 26–29	2.2	Skylar Schneider (USA)	Veronica Ewers (USA)	Heidi Franz (USA)	
(Italy) Giro della Toscana Int. Femminile – Memorial Michela Fanini	August 27–29	2.2	Arlenis Sierra (CUB)	Rasa Leleivytė (LTU)	Debora Silvestri (ITA)	
(Netherlands) Watersley Women's Challenge	September 3–5	2.2	Marit Raaijmakers (NED)	Shari Bossuyt (BEL)	Pien Limpens (NED)	
(France) Tour Cycliste Féminin International de l'Ardèche	September 8–14	2.1	Leah Thomas (USA)	Mavi García (ESP)	Ane Santesteban (ESP)	
(France) Trophée des Grimpeuses Vresse-sur-Semois	September 17–18	2.2	Floortje Mackaij (NED)	Tayler Wiles (USA)	Ella Harris (NZL)	
Vuelta a Colombia Femenina	September 28–October 3	2.2	Lilibeth Chacón (VEN)	Aranza Villalón (CHI)	Miryam Núñez (ECU)	

== Junior races ==
Race	Date	Cat. †	Winner	Second	Third	Ref
(Turkey) Manavgat Side Women Junior	February 18–19	2.1WJ	Alena Ivanchenko (RUS)	Inna Abaidullina (RUS)	Margarita Misyurina (UZB)	
(Turkey) Velo Alanya Women Junior	March 4–5	2.1WJ	Alena Ivanchenko (RUS)	Inna Abaidullina (RUS)	Margarita Misyurina (UZB)	
(Italy) Piccolo Trofeo Alfredo Binda	March 21	1.NcupWJ	Anniina Ahtosalo (FIN)	Noëlle Rüetschi (SUI)	Eglantine Rayer (FRA)	
(France) Tour du Gévaudan Occitanie femmes	May 8–9	2.NcupWJ	Linda Riedmann (GER)	Francesca Barale (ITA)	Anna van der Meiden (NED)	
(Spain) Bizkaikoloreak	August 28–29	2.NcupWJ	Mijntje Geurts (NED)	Anna van der Meiden (NED)	Julia Kopecky (CZE)	
(Netherlands) Watersley Ladies Challenge	September 3–5	2.NcupWJ	Flora Perkins (GBR)	Makayla MacPherson (USA)	Linda Riedmann (GER)	
(France) Chrono des Nations Juniors Femmes	October 17	1.1	Bénédicte Ollier (FRA)	Faustine Croguennoc (FRA)	Coline Raby (FRA)	

== Continental Championships ==
Championships	Race	Winner	Second	Third
African Road Championships; Egypt March 2–6 (2021 summary)	Road race	Carla Oberholzer (RSA)	Hayley Preen (RSA)	Vera Adrian (NAM)
African Road Championships; Egypt March 2–6 (2021 summary)	Individual time trial	Carla Oberholzer (RSA)	Frances Janse van Rensburg (RSA)	Vera Adrian (NAM)
African Road Championships; Egypt March 2–6 (2021 summary)	Road race (Junior)	Chanté Olivier (RSA)	Hapepa Eliwa (EGY)	Nesrine Houili (ALG)
African Road Championships; Egypt March 2–6 (2021 summary)	Individual time trial (Junior)	Chanté Olivier (RSA)	Hapepa Eliwa (EGY)	Nesrine Houili (ALG)
African Road Championships; Egypt March 2–6 (2021 summary)	Team Time Trial	South Africa (RSA); Frances Janse van Rensburg; Carla Oberholzer; Hayley Preen; Maroesjka Matthee	Rwanda (RWA); Diane Ingabire; Valentine Nzayisenga; Jacqueline Tuyishimire; Josiane Mukashema	Ethiopia (ETH); Selam Ahama; Serkalen Taye Watango; Miheret Asegele Gebreyewhans
African Road Championships; Egypt March 2–6 (2021 summary)	Junior Team Time Trial	South Africa (RSA); Chanté Olivier; Ainsli de Beer; Amber Hindmarch; McKenzie Pedro	Egypt (EGY); Habiba Edris; Gana Eliwa; Hapepa Eliwa; Mariam Habib	Not awarded
African Road Championships; Egypt March 2–6 (2021 summary)	Mixed Time Trial	South Africa (RSA); Gustav Basson; Carla Oberholzer; Frances Janse van Rensburg; Hayley Preen; Ryan Gibbons; Kent Main	Rwanda (RWA); Moise Mugisha; Jean Eric Habimana; Diane Ingabire; Valentine Nzayisenga; Jacqueline Tuyishimire; Jean Bosco Nsengimana	Ethiopia (ETH); Sintayehu Kebede; Yared Beharu; Selam Ahama; Miheret Asegele Gebreyewhans; Serkalen Taye Watango; Tsgabu Grmay
Pan-American Road Championships; Dominican Republic August 13–15 (2021 summary)	Road race	Lina Hernández (COL)	Paola Muñoz (CHI)	Teniel Campbell (TTO)
Pan-American Road Championships; Dominican Republic August 13–15 (2021 summary)	Individual time trial	Marlies Mejías (CUB)	Lina Hernández (COL)	Aranza Villalón (CHI)
Pan-American Road Championships; Dominican Republic August 13–15 (2021 summary)	Criterrium Elite	Marlies Mejías (CUB)	Aranza Villalón (CHI)	Miryam Núñez (ECU)
Pan-American Road Championships; Dominican Republic August 13–15 (2021 summary)	Criterrium U23	Lina Hernández (COL)	Abigail Sarabia (BOL)	Romina Hinojosa (MEX)
Caribbean Road Championships; Dominican Republic August 13–15 (2021 summary)	Road race	Juana Fernández (DOM)	Kaya Cattouse (BLZ)	Caitlin Conyers (BER)
Caribbean Road Championships; Dominican Republic August 13–15 (2021 summary)	Road race U23	Amber Joseph (BAR)	Aylena de las Mercedes Quevedo (CUB)	Ludisneli Fleitas (CUB)
Caribbean Road Championships; Dominican Republic August 13–15 (2021 summary)	Individual time trial	Aylena de las Mercedes Quevedo (CUB)	Flor Espiritusanto Estévez (DOM)	Lori Sharpe (JAM)
Caribbean Road Championships; Dominican Republic August 13–15 (2021 summary)	Criterrium Elite	Caitlin Conyers (BER)	Juana Fernández (DOM)	Mary Erato (SXM)
Caribbean Road Championships; Dominican Republic August 13–15 (2021 summary)	Criterrium U23	Aylena de las Mercedes Quevedo (CUB)	Flor Espiritusanto Estévez (DOM)	Lori Sharpe (JAM)
European Road Cycling Championships; Italy September 8–12 (2021 summary)	Road race	Ellen van Dijk (NED)	Liane Lippert (GER)	Rasa Leleivytė (LTU)
European Road Cycling Championships; Italy September 8–12 (2021 summary)	Road race U23	Silvia Zanardi (ITA)	Kata Blanka Vas (HUN)	Évita Muzic (FRA)
European Road Cycling Championships; Italy September 8–12 (2021 summary)	Junior Road Race	Linda Riedmann (GER)	Eleonora Ciabocco (ITA)	Eglantine Rayer (FRA)
European Road Cycling Championships; Italy September 8–12 (2021 summary)	Individual time trial	Marlen Reusser (SUI)	Ellen van Dijk (NED)	Lisa Brennauer (GER)
European Road Cycling Championships; Italy September 8–12 (2021 summary)	U23 Individual time trial	Vittoria Guazzini (ITA)	Hannah Ludwig (GER)	Elena Pirrone (ITA)
European Road Cycling Championships; Italy September 8–12 (2021 summary)	Junior Individual time trial	Alena Ivanchenko (RUS)	Antonia Niedermaier (GER)	Elise Uijen (NED)
European Road Cycling Championships; Italy September 8–12 (2021 summary)	Mixed Relay Team	Italy (ITA); Matteo Sobrero; Alessandro De Marchi; Marta Cavalli; Filippo Ganna; Elena Cecchini; Elisa Longo Borghini	Germany (GER); Miguel Heidemann; Max Walscheid; Mieke Kröger; Justin Wolf; Corinna Lechner; Tanja Erath	Netherlands (NED); Koen Bouwman; Bauke Mollema; Amy Pieters; Jos van Emden; Floortje Mackaij; Demi Vollering
Junior Road Caribbean Championships; Dominican Republic October 22–24 (2021 summary)	Junior Individual time trial	Flor Espiritusanto (DOM)	Rebecca Jansen (ARU)	Liana Medeiros (BER)
Junior Road Caribbean Championships; Dominican Republic October 22–24 (2021 summary)	Junior Road Race	Flor Espiritusanto (DOM)	Chanelle Russell (JAM)	Karel Alexa Ramírez (DOM)

== Teams ==
UCI Women's WorldTeams
Alé BTC Ljubljana
Canyon//SRAM
FDJ Nouvelle-Aquitaine Futuroscope
Liv Racing
Movistar Team
SD Worx
Team BikeExchange
Team DSM
Trek–Segafredo
UCI Women's Continental Teams
A.R. Monex
Andy Schleck–CP NVST–Immo Losch
Arkéa Pro Cycling Team
Aromitalia–Basso Bikes–Vaiano
AWOL O'Shea
Bepink
Bingoal Casino–Chevalmeire
Bizkaia–Durango
Born to Win G20 Ambedo
Burgos Alimenta Women Cycling Sport
CAMS–Basso Bikes
Ceratizit–WNT Pro Cycling
China Liv Pro Cycling
Plantur–Pura
Cogeas–Mettler–Look
DNA Pro Cycling
Doltcini–Van Eyck–Proximus
Drops–Le Col
Eneicat–RBH Global–Martín Villa
Ferei–CCN
GT Krush Tunap
InstaFund Racing
Isolmant–Premac–Vittoria
Laboral Kutxa–Fundación Euskadi
Lotto–Soudal Ladies
Lviv Cycling Team
Macogep Tornatech Girondins de Bordeaux
Massi–Tactic
Minsk Cycling Club
Multum Accountants Ladies
NXTG Racing
Parkhotel Valkenburg
Rally Cycling
Río Miera–Cantabria Deporte
Roxsolt Liv SRAM
Servetto–Makhymo–Beltrami TSA
Sestroretsk
Sopela Women's Team
Stade Rochelais Charente-Maritime
Team Farto–BTC
Team Coop–Hitec Products
Team Illuminate
Team Jumbo–Visma
Team Rupelcleaning–Champion Lubricants
Tibco–Silicon Valley Bank
Top Girls Fassa Bortolo
Valcar–Travel & Service
WCC Team
