= 2016 UEC European Track Championships – Women's keirin =

Women's keirin at the 2016 UEC European Track Championships
- UEC European Champion jersey
- Venue: Vélodrome de Saint-Quentin-en-Yvelines, Yvelines
- Date: 21 October
- Competitors: 19 from 11 nations

Medalists
gold medal	Liubov Basova	Ukraine
silver medal	Nicky Degrendele	Belgium
bronze medal	Simona Krupeckaitė	Lithuania

The Women's keirin was held on 21 October 2016.

== Results ==
=== First round ===
Top two in each heat qualified directly for the semi-finals; the remainder went to the first round repechage.

==== Heat 1 ====
Rank	Name	Nation	Notes
1	Liubov Basova	Ukraine	Q
2	Tania Calvo	Spain	Q
3	Rachel James	Great Britain	
4	Pauline Grabosch	Germany	
5	Olena Starikova	Ukraine	
6	Miriam Vece	Italy	

==== Heat 3 ====
Rank	Name	Nation	Notes
1	Simona Krupeckaitė	Lithuania	Q
2	Helena Casas	Spain	Q
3	Tatiana Kiseleva	Russia	
4	Shannon McCurley	Ireland	
5	Eleanor Richardson	Great Britain	
6	Hetty van de Wouw	Netherlands	
7	Gloria Manzoni	Italy	

==== Heat 2 ====
Rank	Name	Nation	Notes
1	Nicky Degrendele	Belgium	Q
2	Shanne Braspennincx	Netherlands	Q
3	Anastasiia Voinova	Russia	
4	Eimear Moran	Ireland	
5	Miglė Marozaitė	Lithuania	
6	Marie Dufour	France	

=== First round Repechage ===
First three riders in each heat qualified for the semi-finals.

==== Heat 1 ====
Rank	Name	Nation	Notes
1	Miglė Marozaitė	Lithuania	Q
2	Shannon McCurley	Ireland	Q
3	Rachel James	Great Britain	Q
4	Hetty van de Wouw	Netherlands	
5	Miriam Vece	Italy	
6	Eimear Moran	Ireland	REL

==== Heat 2 ====
Rank	Name	Nation	Notes
1	Tatiana Kiseleva	Russia	Q
2	Pauline Grabosch	Germany	Q
3	Anastasiia Voinova	Russia	Q
4	Olena Starikova	Ukraine	
5	Gloria Manzoni	Italy	
6	Marie Dufour	France	
7	Eleanor Richardson	Great Britain	

=== Semi-finals ===
First three riders in each semi qualified for the final; the remainder went to the small final (for places 7-12).

==== Semi-final 1 ====
Rank	Name	Nation	Notes
1	Helena Casas	Spain	Q
2	Tatiana Kiseleva	Russia	Q
3	Liubov Basova	Ukraine	Q
4	Shanne Braspennincx	Netherlands	
5	Anastasiia Voinova	Russia	
6	Shannon McCurley	Ireland	

==== Semi-final 2 ====
Rank	Name	Nation	Notes
1	Simona Krupeckaitė	Lithuania	Q
2	Nicky Degrendele	Belgium	Q
3	Rachel James	Great Britain	Q
4	Pauline Grabosch	Germany	
5	Miglė Marozaitė	Lithuania	
6	Tania Calvo	Spain	

=== Finals ===
The final classification is determined in the ranking finals.

==== Final (places 7-12) ====
Rank	Name	Nation	Notes
7	Anastasiia Voinova	Russia	
8	Tania Calvo	Spain	
9	Shanne Braspennincx	Netherlands	
10	Shannon McCurley	Ireland	
11	Pauline Grabosch	Germany	
12	Miglė Marozaitė	Lithuania	

==== Final (places 1-6) ====
Rank	Name	Nation	Notes
1st place, gold medalist(s)	Liubov Basova	Ukraine	
2nd place, silver medalist(s)	Nicky Degrendele	Belgium	
3rd place, bronze medalist(s)	Simona Krupeckaitė	Lithuania	
4	Helena Casas	Spain	
5	Rachel James	Great Britain	DNF
6	Tatiana Kiseleva	Russia	REL
