= 2015 UEC European Track Championships (under-23 & junior) =

- Venue: Athens, Greece
- Date: 14–19 July 2015
- Velodrome: Athens Olympic Velodrome
- Events: 38

The 2015 UEC European Track Championships (under-23 & junior) were the 15th continental championships for European under-23 and junior track cyclists, and the 6th since the event was renamed following the reorganisation of European track cycling in 2010. The event took place at the Athens Olympic Velodrome in Athens, Greece from 14 to 19 July 2015.

== Medal summary ==
=== Under 23 ===
Event	Gold		Silver		Bronze	
Men's Events
Sprint	Jeffrey Hoogland; Netherlands		Max Niederlag; Germany		Nikita Shurshin; Russia	
1 km time trial	Maximilian Dornbach; Germany	1:01.108	Robin Wagner; Czech Republic	1:01.230	Thomas Copponi; France	1:02.071
Individual pursuit	Marc Fournier; France	caught opponent	Tom Bohli; Switzerland	OVL	Corentin Ermenault; France	4:24.360
Team pursuit	Oliver Wood; Germain Burton; Matthew Gibson; Christopher Latham; Great Britain	3:58.996	Théry Schir; Tom Bohli; Patrick Müller; Frank Pasche; Switzerland	4:02.500	Raman Tsishkou; Yauheni Karaliok; Mikhail Shemetau; Raman Ramanau; Belarus	4:03.121
Team sprint	Richard Assmus; Maximilian Dornbach; Max Niederlag; Germany	44.206	Mateusz Lipa; Mateusz Rudyk; Patryk Rajkowski; Poland	44.780	Alexander Dubchenko; Alexander Sharapov; Nikita Shurshin; Russia	44.559
Keirin	Max Niederlag; Germany		Nikita Shurshin; Russia		Jonathan Mitchell; Great Britain	
Scratch	Matthew Gibson; Great Britain		Marcel Franz; Germany		Ondřej Rybín; Czech Republic	
Points race	Raman Ramanau; Belarus	78 pts	Andrey Sazanov; Russia	72 pts	Julio Amores; Spain	61 pts
Madison	Théry Schir; Frank Pasche; Switzerland	11 pts	Thomas Boudat; Benjamin Thomas; France	19 pts (1 lap down)	Simone Consonni; Francesco Lamon; Italy	14 pts (1 lap down)
Omnium	Théry Schir; Switzerland	195 pts	Oliver Wood; Great Britain	189 pts	Thomas Boudat; France	184 pts
Women's Events
Sprint	Anastasiia Voinova; Russia		Elis Ligtlee; Netherlands		Victoria Williamson; Great Britain	
500 m time trial	Anastasiia Voinova; Russia	33.343	Daria Shmeleva; Russia; Elis Ligtlee; Netherlands	34.177	none awarded	
Individual pursuit	Amalie Dideriksen; Denmark	3:30.600	Katie Archibald; Great Britain	3:31.984	Mieke Kröger; Germany	3:36.998
Team pursuit	Ina Savenka; Katsiaryna Piatrouskaya; Palina Pivavarava; Maryna Shmayankova; Belarus	4:29.067	Anna Knauer; Lisa Klein; Mieke Kröger; Gudrun Stock; Germany	4:30.651	Tamara Balabolina; Gulnaz Badykova; Alexandra Chekina; Natalia Mozharova; Russia	4:29.358
Team sprint	Daria Shmeleva; Anastasiia Voinova; Russia	33.016	Katy Marchant; Victoria Williamson; Great Britain	33.457	Kyra Lamberink; Elis Ligtlee; Netherlands	33.989
Keirin	Katy Marchant; Great Britain		Melissandre Pain; France		Elis Ligtlee; Netherlands	
Scratch	Soline Lamboley; France		Natalia Mozharova; Russia		Maryna Shmayankova; Belarus	
Points race	Gulnaz Badykova; Russia	41 pts	Ina Savenka; Belarus	30 pts	Palina Pivavarava; Belarus	26 pts
Omnium	Amalie Dideriksen; Denmark	227 pts	Tamara Balabolina; Russia	223 pts	Anna Knauer; Germany	203 pts

=== Junior ===
Event	Gold		Silver		Bronze	
Men's Events
Sprint	Melvin Landerneau; France		Sebastien Vigier; France		Alexey Nosov; Russia	
1 km time trial	Aleksandr Vasyukhno; Russia	1:03.529	Maksim Piskunov; Russia	1:04.233	Sam Ligtlee; Netherlands	1:04.386
Individual pursuit^{[J]}	Daniel Staniszewski; Poland	3:16.732	Thomas Denis; France	3:20.005	Maksim Sukhov; Russia	3:20.178
Team pursuit	Sergey Rostovtsev; Dmitriy Markov; Maksim Piskunov; Maksim Sukhov; Russia	4:05.305	Niklas Larsen; Rasmus Lund Pedersen; Frederik Rodenberg Madsen; Tim Vang Cronqvist; Denmark	4:12.141	Dawid Czubak; Szymon Krawczyk; Mikolaj Sojka; Daniel Staniszewski; Poland	4:09.002
Team sprint	Sergey Isaev; Alexey Nosov; Aleksandr Vasyukhno; Russia	45.021	Marcin Czyszczewski; Michal Lewandowski; Mateusz Milek; Poland	45.847	Jack Carlin; Alexander Joliffe; Joseph Truman; Great Britain	46.113
Keirin	Alexey Nosov; Russia		Jiří Janošek; Czech Republic		Sebastien Vigier; France	
Scratch	Edgar Stepanyan; Armenia		Maksim Piskunov; Russia	1 lap down	Vitali Prakapchuk; Belarus	1 lap down
Points race	Joey Walker; Great Britain	17 pts	Szymon Krawczyk; Poland	15 pts	Denis Nekrasov; Russia	13 pts
Madison	Dmitri Markov; Maksim Piskunov; Russia	15 pts	Robbe Ghys; Gerben Thijssen; Belgium	12 pts	Andreas Stokbro Nielsen; Mathias Dahl Pedersen; Denmark	10 pts
Omnium	Dawid Czubak; Poland	238 pts	Taras Shevchuk; Ukraine	226 pts	Sergey Rostovtsev; Russia	215 pts
Women's Events
Sprint	Emma Hinze; Germany		Pauline Grabosch; Germany		Julita Jagodzinska; Poland	
500 m time trial	Emma Hinze; Germany	35.188	Pauline Grabosch; Germany	35.349	Hetty van de Wouw; Netherlands	35.642
Individual pursuit^{[J]}	Justyna Kaczkowska; Poland	2:23.598	Marion Borras; France	2:25.644	Olivija Baleišytė; Lithuania	2:26.041
Team pursuit	Elisa Balsamo; Rachele Barbieri; Sofia Bertizzolo; Marta Cavalli; Italy	4:33.463; WJR	Daria Pikulik; Justyna Kaczkowska; Weronika Humelt; Nikola Rozynska; Poland	4:40.371	Marion Borras; Pauline Clouard; Lucie Jounier; Typhaine Laurance; France	4:39.082
Team sprint	Emma Hinze; Pauline Grabosch; Germany	34.786	Elena Bissolati; Miriam Vece; Italy	35.322	Kseniya Bogoyavlenskaya; Olga Goncharova; Russia	35.096
Keirin	Emma Hinze; Germany		Kseniya Bogoyavlenskaya; Russia		Marlena Karwacka; Poland	
Scratch	Elena Bissolati; Italy		Eleanor Dickinson; Great Britain		Hetty van de Wouw; Netherlands	
Points race	Rachele Barbieri; Italy	35 pts	Daria Pikulik; Poland	33 pts	Tessa Dijksman; Netherlands	24 pts
Omnium	Daria Pikulik; Poland	192 pts	Grace Garner; Great Britain	181 pts	Marion Borras; France	178 pts

=== Notes ===
- ^{^{J}} In junior competitions, individual pursuits are contested over 3km/2km for men/women respectively.

== Medal table ==
Rank	Nation	Gold	Silver	Bronze	Total
1	Russia (RUS)	9	8	8	25
2	Germany (GER)	7	5	2	14
3	Great Britain (GBR)	4	5	3	12
3	Poland (POL)	4	5	3	12
5	France (FRA)	3	5	6	14
6	Italy (ITA)	3	1	1	5
7	Switzerland (SUI)	2	2	0	4
8	Belarus (BLR)	2	1	4	7
9	Denmark (DEN)	2	1	1	4
10	Netherlands (NED)	1	2	6	9
11	Armenia (ARM)	1	0	0	1
12	Czech Republic (CZE)	0	2	1	3
13	Belgium (BEL)	0	1	0	1
13	Ukraine (UKR)	0	1	0	1
15	Lithuania (LTU)	0	0	1	1
15	Spain (ESP)	0	0	1	1
Totals (16 entries)		38	39	37	114
