= 2015 UEC European Track Championships – Women's team pursuit =

Women's team pursuit at the 2015 UEC European Track Championships
- UEC European Champion jersey
- Venue: Velodrome Suisse, Grenchen
- Date: 14–15 October
- Competitors: 45 from 10 nations

Medalists
gold medal	Laura Trott; Katie Archibald; Elinor Barker; Joanna Rowsell; Ciara Horne	Great Britain
silver medal	Gulnaz Badykova; Tamara Balabolina; Alexandra Chekina; Maria Savitskaya; Evgenia Romanyuta; Aleksandra Goncharova	Russia
bronze medal	Katsiaryna Piatrouskaya; Palina Pivavarava; Ina Savenka; Maryna Shmayankova	Belarus

The Women's team pursuit was held on 14–15 October 2015.

== Results ==
=== Qualifying ===
The fastest 8 teams qualify for the first round, from which the top 4 remain in contention for the gold medal final and the other 4 for the bronze medal final.

Rank	Name	Nation	Time	Notes
1	Laura Trott; Elinor Barker; Ciara Horne; Joanna Rowsell	Great Britain	4:21.089	Q
2	Evgenia Romanyuta; Gulnaz Badykova; Tamara Balabolina; Aleksandra Goncharova	Russia	4:30.664	Q
3	Simona Frapporti; Beatrice Bartelloni; Tatiana Guderzo; Silvia Valsecchi	Italy	4:32.480	Q
4	Małgorzata Wojtyra; Edyta Jasińska; Katarzyna Pawłowska; Natalia Rutkowska	Poland	4:33.305	Q
5	Charlotte Becker; Mieke Kröger; Stephanie Pohl; Gudrun Stock	Germany	4:33.326	q
6	Katsiaryna Piatrouskaya; Palina Pivavarava; Ina Savenka; Maryna Shmayankova	Belarus	4:33.404	q
7	Élise Delzenne; Coralie Demay; Fiona Dutriaux; Roxane Fournier	France	4:34.521	q
8	Lydia Boylan; Josie Knight; Caroline Ryan; Melanie Späth	Ireland	4:35.090	q
9	Leire Olaberria; Maria Del Mar Bonnin; Gloria Rodríguez; Irene Usabiaga	Spain	4:40.765	
10	Tetyana Klimchenko; Oksana Kliachina; Inna Metalnikova; Hanna Solovey	Ukraine	4:48.152	

- Q = qualified; in contention for gold medal final
- q = qualified; in contention for bronze medal final

=== First round ===
First round heats are held as follows:
Heat 1: 6th v 7th qualifier
Heat 2: 5th v 8th qualifier
Heat 3: 2nd v 3rd qualifier
Heat 4: 1st v 4th qualifier

The winners of heats 3 and 4 proceed to the gold medal final. The remaining 6 teams are ranked on time, then proceed to the finals for bronze, 5th or 7th place.

Rank	Heat	Name	Nation	Time	Notes
1	4	Katie Archibald; Elinor Barker; Ciara Horne; Joanna Rowsell	Great Britain	4:17.708	QG
2	3	Evgenia Romanyuta; Gulnaz Badykova; Tamara Balabolina; Aleksandra Goncharova	Russia	4:28.451	QG
3	4	Małgorzata Wojtyra; Edyta Jasińska; Katarzyna Pawłowska; Natalia Rutkowska	Poland	4:27.562	QB
4	1	Katsiaryna Piatrouskaya; Palina Pivavarava; Ina Savenka; Maryna Shmayankova	Belarus	4:29.548	QB
5	3	Simona Frapporti; Beatrice Bartelloni; Tatiana Guderzo; Silvia Valsecchi	Italy	4:30.294	Q5
6	2	Lydia Boylan; Josie Knight; Caroline Ryan; Melanie Späth	Ireland	4:31.666	Q5
7	2	Charlotte Becker; Mieke Kröger; Stephanie Pohl; Gudrun Stock	Germany	4:32.535	Q7
8	1	Élise Delzenne; Coralie Demay; Fiona Dutriaux; Roxane Fournier	France	4:38.238	Q7

- QG = qualified for gold medal final
- QB = qualified for bronze medal final
- Q5 = qualified for 5th place final
- Q7 = qualified for 7th place final

=== Finals ===
The final classification is determined in the ranking finals.

Rank	Name	Nation	Time	Notes
Final for 7th place
7	Élise Delzenne; Coralie Demay; Fiona Dutriaux; Roxane Fournier	France	4:30.519	
8	Charlotte Becker; Lisa Klein; Mieke Kröger; Gudrun Stock	Germany	4:33.097	
Final for 5th place
5	Simona Frapporti; Beatrice Bartelloni; Tatiana Guderzo; Silvia Valsecchi	Italy	4:30.021	
6	Lydia Boylan; Josie Knight; Eimear Moran; Melanie Späth	Ireland	4:34.413	
Bronze medal final
3rd place, bronze medalist(s)	Katsiaryna Piatrouskaya; Palina Pivavarava; Ina Savenka; Maryna Shmayankova	Belarus	4:32.595	
4	Małgorzata Wojtyra; Edyta Jasińska; Katarzyna Pawłowska; Natalia Rutkowska	Poland	OVL	
Gold medal final
1st place, gold medalist(s)	Laura Trott; Katie Archibald; Elinor Barker; Joanna Rowsell	Great Britain	4:17.010	
2nd place, silver medalist(s)	Gulnaz Badykova; Tamara Balabolina; Alexandra Chekina; Maria Savitskaya	Russia	OVL	
