= 2017 UEC European Track Championships – Women's scratch =

Women's scratch at the 2017 UEC European Track Championships
- UEC European Champion jersey
- Venue: Velodrom, Berlin
- Date: 21 October
- Competitors: 18 from 18 nations

Medalists
| gold medal | Trine Schmidt | Denmark |
| silver medal | Tetyana Klimchenko | Ukraine |
| bronze medal | Evgeniya Augustinas | Russia |

The Women's scratch was held on 21 October 2017.

== Results ==
| Rank | Name | Nation | Laps down |
|---|---|---|---|
| 1st place, gold medalist(s) | Trine Schmidt | Denmark | |
| 2nd place, silver medalist(s) | Tetyana Klimchenko | Ukraine | |
| 3rd place, bronze medalist(s) | Evgeniya Augustinas | Russia | |
| 4 | Lydia Gurley | Ireland | |
| 5 | Aline Seitz | Switzerland | -1 |
| 6 | Hanna Tserakh | Belarus | -1 |
| 7 | Ane Iriarte | Spain | -1 |
| 8 | Rachele Barbieri | Italy | -1 |
| 9 | Alžbeta Bačíková | Slovakia | -1 |
| 10 | Valentine Fortin | France | -1 |
| 11 | Justyna Kaczkowska | Poland | -1 |
| 12 | Ellie Dickinson | Great Britain | -1 |
| 13 | Amy Pieters | Netherlands | -1 |
| 14 | Pia Pensaari | Finland | -1 |
| 15 | Gilke Croket | Belgium | -1 |
| 16 | Lucie Hochmann | Czech Republic | -1 |
| | Verena Eberhardt | Austria | DNF |
| | Romy Kasper | Germany | DNF |
