= 2016 UEC European Track Championships – Women's team sprint =

Women's team sprint at the 2016 UEC European Track Championships
- UEC European Champion jersey
- Venue: Vélodrome de Saint-Quentin-en-Yvelines, Yvelines
- Date: 20 October
- Competitors: 18 from 9 nations

Medalists
gold medal	Daria Shmeleva; Anastasiia Voinova	Russia
silver medal	Tania Calvo; Helena Casas	Spain
bronze medal	Simona Krupeckaitė; Miglė Marozaitė	Lithuania

The Women's team sprint was held on 20 October 2016.

== Results ==
=== Qualifying ===
The fastest 8 teams qualify for the first round.

Rank	Name	Nation	Time	Notes
1	Daria Shmeleva; Anastasia Voynova	Russia	33.811	Q
2	Tania Calvo; Helena Casas	Spain	34.095	Q
3	Shanne Braspennincx; Kyra Lamberink	Netherlands	34.199	Q
4	Simona Krupeckaitė; Miglė Marozaitė	Lithuania	34.202	Q
5	Rachel James; Eleanor Richardson	Great Britain	34.681	Q
6	Pauline Grabosch; Gudrun Stock	Germany	35.544	Q
7	Lyubov Basova; Valeriia Zalizna	Ukraine	35.634	Q
8	Gloria Manzoni; Miriam Vece	Italy	35.856	Q
9	Eimear Moran; Robyn Stewart	Ireland	36.638	

- Q = qualified

=== First round ===
First round heats are held as follows:
Heat 1: 4th v 5th qualifier
Heat 2: 3rd v 6th qualifier
Heat 3: 2nd v 7th qualifier
Heat 4: 1st v 8th qualifier

The heat winners are ranked on time, from which the top 2 proceed to the gold medal final and the other 2 proceed to the bronze medal final.

Rank	Heat	Name	Nation	Time	Notes
1	4	Daria Shmeleva; Anastasia Voynova	Russia	33.262	QG
2	3	Tania Calvo; Helena Casas	Spain	33.289	QG
3	2	Shanne Braspennincx; Kyra Lamberink	Netherlands	33.801	QB
4	1	Simona Krupeckaitė; Miglė Marozaitė	Lithuania	34.004	QB
5	1	Rachel James; Eleanor Richardson	Great Britain	34.379	
6	4	Gloria Manzoni; Miriam Vece	Italy	35.331	
7	2	Pauline Grabosch; Gudrun Stock	Germany	35.558	
8	3	Lyubov Basova; Valeriia Zalizna	Ukraine	35.785	

- QG = qualified for gold medal final
- QB = qualified for bronze medal final

=== Finals ===
The final classification is determined in the medal finals.

Rank	Name	Nation	Time	Notes
Bronze medal final
3rd place, bronze medalist(s)	Simona Krupeckaitė; Miglė Marozaitė	Lithuania	33.871	
4	Shanne Braspennincx; Kyra Lamberink	Netherlands	33.955	
Gold medal final
1st place, gold medalist(s)	Daria Shmeleva; Anastasia Voynova	Russia	33.356	
2nd place, silver medalist(s)	Tania Calvo; Helena Casas	Spain	33.425	
