= Yuliia Biriukova =

Ukrainian cyclist (born 1998)

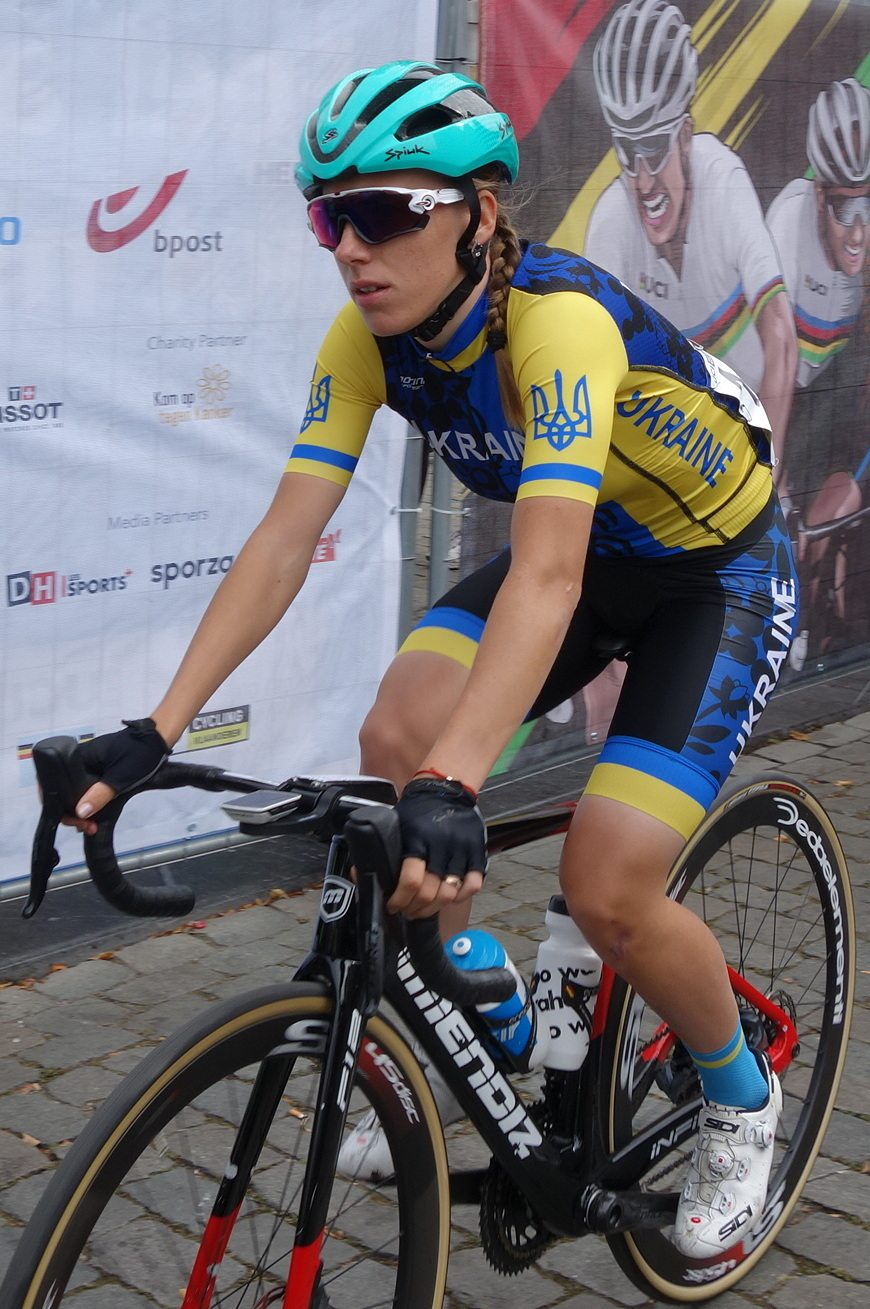
- Biriukova at the 2021 World Championships

Personal information
- Full name: Yuliia Biriukova
- Born: 24 January 1998 (age 28) Lviv, Ukraine

Cycling career
- Sport: Cycling
- Current team: Laboral Kutxa–Fundación Euskadi
- Disciplines: Road; Track
- Role: Rider

Professional teams
- 2019–2020: Lviv Cycling Team
- 2021: Eneicat–RBH Global–Martín Villa
- 2022: Arkéa Pro Cycling Team
- 2023: UAE Development Team
- 2024: Human Powered Health
- 2025–: Laboral Kutxa–Fundación Euskadi
Medal record
Women's track cycling
Representing Ukraine
European Championships
Bronze medal – third place	2020 Plovdiv	Team pursuit

Yuliia Biriukova (born 24 January 1998) is a Ukrainian professional racing cyclist, who currently rides for UCI Women's ProTeam Laboral Kutxa–Fundación Euskadi. She rode in the women's road race event at the 2020 UCI Road World Championships.

== Major results ==
2018
2nd Time trial, National Under-23 Road Championships
8th Time trial, UEC European Under-23 Road Championships
9th Horizon Park Women Challenge
2020
National Under-23 Road Championships

1st Road race
1st Time trial

3rd Team pursuit, European Track Championships
7th Grand Prix Alanya
8th Time trial, UEC European Under-23 Road Championships
2021
National Road Championships

4th Road race
4th Time trial

7th Grand Prix Velo Alanya
7th Grand Prix Gündoğmuş
7th Grand Prix Kayseri
9th Grand Prix Erciyes
2022
1st Stage 5 Thüringen Ladies Tour
2nd Grand Prix Gazipaşa
2nd GP Mediterrennean
3rd À travers les Hauts-de-France
4th Grand Prix Velo Alanya
6th Overall Tour féminin international des Pyrénées
7th Mont Ventoux Dénivelé Challenge
2023
1st Stage 1b (TTT) Trofeo Ponente in Rosa
National Road Championships

2nd Road race
2nd Time trial

3rd Gran Premio Ciudad de Eibar
6th Overall Vuelta a Andalucía
7th Respect Ladies Race Slovakia
7th La Classique Morbihan
2024
2nd Clásica de Almería
