= Maryna Zuyeva =

Belarusian speed skater (born 1992)

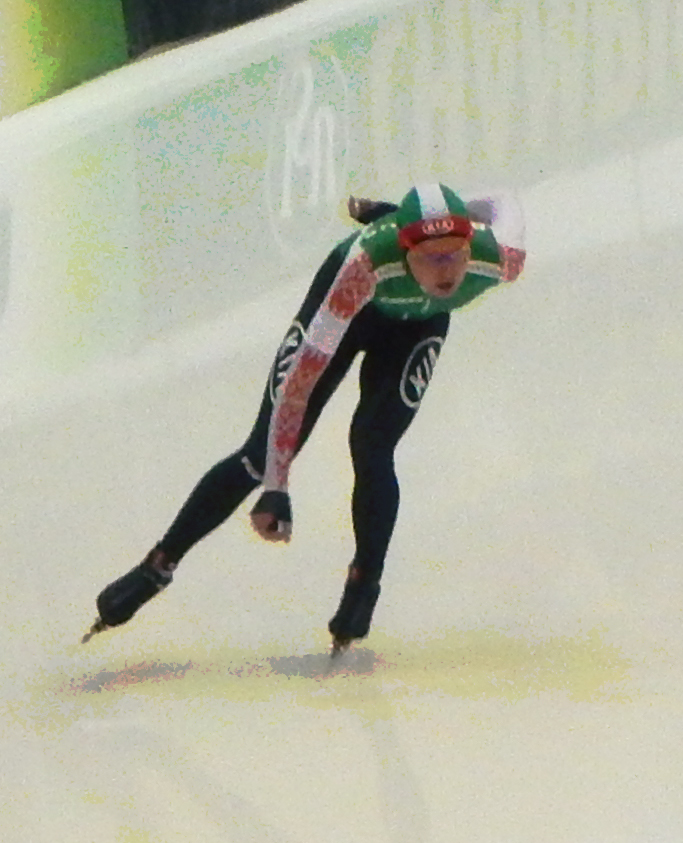
- 2016 World Single Distances Speed Skating Championships

Personal information
- Native name: Марына Артураўна Зуева
- Full name: Maryna Arturauna Zuyeva
- Nationality: Belarusian
- Born: 20 March 1992 (age 34) Minsk, Belarus
- Height: 1.79 m (5 ft 10 in)

Sport
- Sport: Speed skating; Road bicycle racing
- Cycling career
- Sport: Cycling
- Current team: Ferei–CCN
- Discipline: Road
- Role: Rider

Professional team
- 2021–: Ferei–CCN
Medal record
Women's speed skating
Representing Belarus
European Championships
Bronze medal – third place	2020 Heerenven	Team pursuit

Maryna Zuyeva (Belarusian: Марына Зуева, also transliterated Marina Zueva, born 20 March 1992) is a Belarusian speed skater and cyclist, who currently rides for UCI Women's Continental Team Ferei–CCN. She competed in the women's 3000 metres at the 2018 Winter Olympics.
