= 2021 in cycling =

2021 in cycling included the following:

- 2021 in men's road cycling
- 2021 in women's road cycling
