= Valeriia Zalizna =

Ukrainian cyclist

Personal information
- Full name: Valeriia Zalizna
- Born: 25 April 1996 (age 30)

Cycling career
- Sport: Cycling
- Disciplines: Road; Track
- Role: Rider

Professional team
- 2019: Lviv Cycling Team

Valeriia Zalizna (born 25 April 1996) is a Ukrainian road and track cyclist, who last rode for UCI Women's Team Lviv Cycling Team, and represents Ukraine at international competitions. In 2015, she won the individual pursuit at the Ukrainian National Track Championships. She competed at the 2016 UEC European Track Championships in the team sprint event.

== Major results ==
2014
Grand Prix Galichyna

2nd Team sprint (with Viktoriya Bondar)
3rd Sprint
