= 2017 UEC European Track Championships – Women's sprint =

Women's sprint at the 2017 UEC European Track Championships
- UEC European Champion jersey
- Venue: Velodrom, Berlin
- Date: 22 October
- Competitors: 20 from 12 nations

Medalists
gold medal	Kristina Vogel	Germany
silver medal	Mathilde Gros	France
bronze medal	Daria Shmeleva	Russia

The Women's sprint was held on 22 October 2017.

== Results ==
=== Qualifying ===
The top twelve riders advanced directly to the 1/8 finals; places 13 to 20 advanced to the 1/16 finals.

Rank	Name	Nation	Time	Notes
1	Kristina Vogel	Germany	10.643	Q
2	Pauline Grabosch	Germany	10.741	Q
3	Mathilde Gros	France	10.764	Q
4	Anastasiia Voinova	Russia	10.770	Q
5	Daria Shmeleva	Russia	10.886	Q
6	Miglė Marozaitė	Lithuania	10.906	Q
7	Hetty van de Wouw	Netherlands	10.909	Q
8	Laurine van Riessen	Netherlands	10.916	Q
9	Olena Starikova	Ukraine	10.983	Q
10	Simona Krupeckaitė	Lithuania	11.073	Q
11	Tania Calvo	Spain	11.135	Q
12	Liubov Basova	Ukraine	11.185	Q
13	Sára Kaňkovská	Czech Republic	11.209	q
14	Sophie Capewell	Great Britain	11.218	q
15	Julita Jagodzińska	Poland	11.279	q
16	Nicky Degrendele	Belgium	11.337	q
17	Sandie Clair	France	11.427	q
18	Robyn Stewart	Ireland	11.460	q
19	Helena Casas	Spain	11.540	q
20	Marlena Karwacka	Poland	11.601	q

=== 1/16 Finals ===
Winners proceed to the 1/8 finals.

Heat	Rank	Name	Nation	Time	Notes
1	1	Sára Kaňkovská	Czech Republic	11.568	Q
1	2	Marlena Karwacka	Poland		
2	1	Helena Casas	Spain	11.889	Q
2	2	Sophie Capewell	Great Britain		
3	1	Julita Jagodzińska	Poland	11.999	Q
3	2	Robyn Stewart	Ireland		
4	1	Nicky Degrendele	Belgium	11.887	Q
4	2	Sandie Clair	France		

=== 1/8 Finals ===
Winners proceed to the quarter-finals.

Heat	Rank	Name	Nation	Time	Notes
1	1	Kristina Vogel	Germany	11.480	Q
1	2	Nicky Degrendele	Belgium		
2	1	Pauline Grabosch	Germany	11.426	Q
2	2	Julita Jagodzińska	Poland		
3	1	Mathilde Gros	France	11.619	Q
3	2	Helena Casas	Spain		
4	1	Anastasiia Voinova	Russia	11.462	Q
4	2	Sára Kaňkovská	Czech Republic		
5	1	Daria Shmeleva	Russia	11.559	Q
5	2	Liubov Basova	Ukraine		
6	1	Miglė Marozaitė	Lithuania	11.584	Q
6	2	Tania Calvo	Spain		
7	1	Simona Krupeckaitė	Lithuania	11.539	Q
7	2	Hetty van de Wouw	Netherlands		
8	1	Olena Starikova	Ukraine	11.337	Q
8	2	Laurine van Riessen	Netherlands		

=== Quarter-finals ===
One-on-one matches are extended to a 'best of three' format hereon. Winners proceed to the semi-finals.

Heat	Rank	Name	Nation	Race 1	Race 2	Decider	Notes
1	1	Kristina Vogel	Germany	11.327	11.253		Q
1	2	Olena Starikova	Ukraine				
2	1	Pauline Grabosch	Germany	11.237	11.261		Q
2	2	Simona Krupeckaitė	Lithuania				
3	1	Mathilde Gros	France	11.521	11.362		Q
3	2	Miglė Marozaitė	Lithuania				
4	1	Daria Shmeleva	Russia	11.341		11.483	Q
4	2	Anastasiia Voinova	Russia		11.517		

=== Semi-finals ===
Winners proceed to the gold medal final; losers proceed to the bronze medal final.

Heat	Rank	Name	Nation	Race 1	Race 2	Decider	Notes
1	1	Kristina Vogel	Germany	11.538	11.610		Q
1	2	Daria Shmeleva	Russia				
2	1	Mathilde Gros	France		11.187	12.109	Q
2	2	Pauline Grabosch	Germany	11.424			

=== Finals ===
The final classification is determined in the medal finals.

Rank	Name	Nation	Race 1	Race 2	Decider
Bronze medal final
3rd place, bronze medalist(s)	Daria Shmeleva	Russia	11.540	11.636	
4	Pauline Grabosch	Germany			
Gold medal final
1st place, gold medalist(s)	Kristina Vogel	Germany	11.283	11.154	
2nd place, silver medalist(s)	Mathilde Gros	France			
