= 2016 UEC European Track Championships – Women's 500 m time trial =

Women's 500 m time trial at the 2016 UEC European Track Championships
- UEC European Champion jersey
- Venue: Vélodrome de Saint-Quentin-en-Yvelines, Yvelines
- Date: 19 October
- Competitors: 16 from 11 nations

Medalists
gold medal	Daria Shmeleva	Russia
silver medal	Pauline Grabosch	Germany
bronze medal	Anastasiia Voinova	Russia

The Women's 500 m time trial was held on 19 October 2016.

== Results ==
Rank	Name	Nation	Time	Notes
1st place, gold medalist(s)	Daria Shmeleva	Russia	34.310	
2nd place, silver medalist(s)	Pauline Grabosch	Germany	34.318	
3rd place, bronze medalist(s)	Anastasiia Voinova	Russia	34.483	
4	Tania Calvo	Spain	34.497	
5	Olena Starikova	Ukraine	34.906	
6	Shanne Braspennincx	Netherlands	35.132	
7	Rachel James	Great Britain	35.139	
8	Kyra Lamberink	Netherlands	35.157	
9	Miglė Marozaitė	Lithuania	35.359	
10	Miriam Vece	Italy	35.987	
11	Eleanor Richardson	Great Britain	36.060	
12	Robyn Stewart	Ireland	36.663	
13	Gloria Manzoni	Italy	36.728	
14	Eimear Moran	Ireland	37.296	
15	Pia Pensaari	Finland	38.453	
16	Virginie Perizzolo Pointet	Switzerland	38.612	
