= 2012 Gracia-Orlová =

2012 Gracia–Orlová
Race details
- Dates: 25–29 April
- Stages: prologue + 4 stages
- Distance: 355.2 km (220.7 mi)
- Winning time: 9h 45' 11"

Results
	Winner	Evelyn Stevens (United States of America)	(Team Specialized–lululemon)
	Second	Trixi Worrack (Germany)	(Team Specialized–lululemon)
	Third	Sharon Laws (United Kingdom)	(AA Drink–leontien.nl)
	Points	Evelyn Stevens (United States of America)	(Team Specialized–lululemon)
	Mountains	Alena Amialiusik (Belarus)	(BePink)
	Youth	Pauliena Rooijakkers (Netherlands)	(Dolmans-Boels Cycling Team)
	Sprints	Alena Amialiusik (Belarus)	(BePink)

The 2012 Gracia–Orlová was the 26th edition of the Gracia–Orlová, a women's cycling stage race. It was an UCI 2.2 category race, and was held between 25 and 29 April 2012 in the Czech Republic and Poland.

== Stages ==
=== Prologue ===
25 April 2012 – Havírov to Havírov (individual time trial), 2.2 km (1.4 mi)

Prologue result

	Rider	Team	Time
1	Ellen van Dijk (NED)	Team Specialized–lululemon	2' 47"
2	Trixi Worrack (GER)	Team Specialized–lululemon	+ 1"
3	Melissa Hoskins (AUS)	Australian National Team	+ 3"

General classification after the prologue

	Rider	Team	Time
1	Ellen van Dijk (NED)	Team Specialized–lululemon	2' 47"
2	Trixi Worrack (GER)	Team Specialized–lululemon	+ 1"
3	Melissa Hoskins (AUS)	Australian National Team	+ 3"

=== Stage 1 ===
26 April 2012 – Detmarovice to Štramberk, 105.1 km (65.3 mi)

Stage 1 result

	Rider	Team	Time
1	Evelyn Stevens (USA)	Team Specialized–lululemon	2h 55' 52"
2	Sharon Laws (GBR)	AA Drink–leontien.nl	+ 2"
3	Alena Amialiusik (BLR)	BePink	+ 2"

General classification after stage 1

	Rider	Team	Time
1	Evelyn Stevens (USA)	Team Specialized–lululemon	2h 58' 32"
2	Trixi Worrack (GER)	Team Specialized–lululemon	+ 12"
3	Ellen van Dijk (NED)	Team Specialized–lululemon	+ 13"

=== Stage 2 ===
27 April 2012 – Havírov to Havírov (individual time trial), 26 km (16.2 mi)

Stage 2 result

	Rider	Team	Time
1	Ellen van Dijk (NED)	Team Specialized–lululemon	35' 27"
2	Evelyn Stevens (USA)	Team Specialized–lululemon	+ 0"
3	Tatiana Antoshina (RUS)	Russian National Team	+ 1' 06"

General classification after stage 2

	Rider	Team	Time
1	Evelyn Stevens (USA)	Team Specialized–lululemon	3h 33' 59"
2	Ellen van Dijk (NED)	Team Specialized–lululemon	+ 13"
3	Trixi Worrack (GER)	Team Specialized–lululemon	+ 1' 25"

=== Stage 3 ===
28 April 2012 – Lichnov to Lichnov, 105 km (65.2 mi)

Stage 3 result

	Rider	Team	Time
1	Trixi Worrack (GER)	Team Specialized–lululemon	3h 02' 14"
2	Alena Amialiusik (BLR)	BePink	+ 6"
3	Evelyn Stevens (USA)	Team Specialized–lululemon	+ 6"

General classification after stage 3

	Rider	Team	Time
1	Evelyn Stevens (USA)	Team Specialized–lululemon	6h 36' 15"
2	Trixi Worrack (GER)	Team Specialized–lululemon	+ 1'13"
3	Sharon Laws (GBR)	AA Drink–leontien.nl	+ 3' 36"

=== Stage 4 ===
29 April 2012 – Orlová to Orlová, 116.9 km (72.6 mi)

Stage 4 result

	Rider	Team	Time
1	Katie Colclough (GBR)	Team Specialized–lululemon	3h 08' 13"
2	Gracie Elvin (AUS)	Australian National Team	+ 6"
3	Marijn de Vries (NED)	AA Drink–leontien.nl	+ 6"

General classification after stage 4

	Rider	Team	Time
1	Evelyn Stevens (USA)	Team Specialized–lululemon	9h 45' 11"
2	Trixi Worrack (GER)	Team Specialized–lululemon	+ 1' 20"
3	Sharon Laws (GBR)	AA Drink–leontien.nl	+ 3' 36"

== Final classifications ==
=== General classification ===
	Rider	Team	Time
1	Evelyn Stevens (USA)	Team Specialized–lululemon	9h 45' 11"
2	Trixi Worrack (GER)	Team Specialized–lululemon	+ 1' 20"
3	Sharon Laws (GBR)	AA Drink–leontien.nl	+ 3' 36"
4	Tatiana Antoshina (RUS)	Russian National Team	+ 3' 50"
5	Alena Amialiusik (BLR)	BePink	+ 3' 52"
6	Ellen van Dijk (NED)	Team Specialized–lululemon	+ 6' 32"
7	Olena Sharha (UKR)	Ukraine National Team	+ 6' 51"
8	Olena Pavlukhina (UKR)	Ukraine National Team	+ 8' 17"
9	Alexandra Burchenkova (RUS)	S.C. Michela Fanini Record Rox	+ 9' 23"
10	Audrey Cordon (FRA)	Vienne Futuroscope	+ 10' 03"

=== Points classification ===
	Rider	Team	Points
1	Evelyn Stevens (USA)	Team Specialized–lululemon	56
2	Sharon Laws (GBR)	AA Drink–leontien.nl	49
3	Alena Amialiusik (BLR)	BePink	44
4	Trixi Worrack (GER)	Team Specialized–lululemon	40
5	Katie Colclough (GBR)	Team Specialized–lululemon	31
6	Andrea Graus (AUT)	Vienne Futuroscope	28
7	Olena Sharha (UKR)	Ukraine National Team	24
8	Ellen van Dijk (NED)	Team Specialized–lululemon	22
9	Paulina Brezna (POL)	LKS Atom Boxmet Dzierzoniów	22
10	Olena Pavlukhina (UKR)	Ukraine National Team	21

=== Mountain classification ===
	Rider	Team	Points
1	Alena Amialiusik (BLR)	BePink	50
2	Evelyn Stevens (USA)	Team Specialized–lululemon	25
3	Trixi Worrack (GER)	Team Specialized–lululemon	24
4	Sharon Laws (GBR)	AA Drink–leontien.nl	22
5	Olena Sharha (UKR)	Ukraine National Team	20

=== Youth classification ===
	Rider	Team	Points
1	Pauliena Rooijakkers (NED)	Dolmans-Boels Cycling Team	9h 45' 11"
2	Katie Colclough (GBR)	Team Specialized–lululemon	+ 13"
3	Larisa Pankova (RUS)	Russian National Team	+ 26
4	Sinead Noonan (AUS)	Australian National Team	+ 2' 41"
5	Jacqueline Hahn (AUT)	Austria National Team	+ 3' 47"
