= Oksana Kliachina =

Ukrainian cyclist (born 1997)

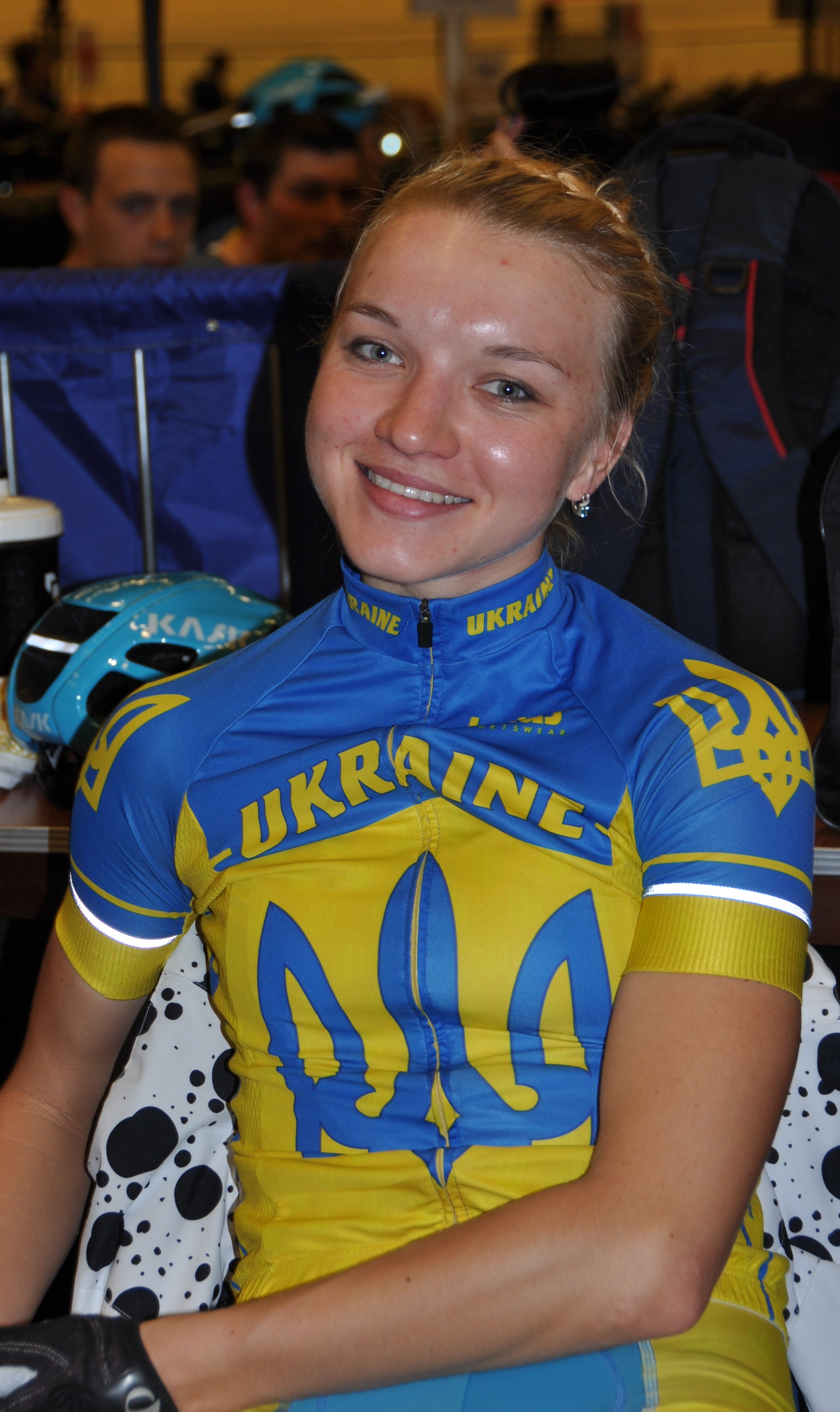
- Oksana Kliachina (2018)

Personal information
- Full name: Oksana Kliachina
- Born: 11 September 1997 (age 29)

Cycling career
- Sport: Cycling
- Current team: Lviv Cycling Team
- Disciplines: Road; Track
- Role: Rider

Professional team
- 2019–: Lviv Cycling Team

Oksana Kliachina (born 11 September 1997) is a Ukrainian road and track cyclist, who currently rides for UCI Women's Team Lviv Cycling Team, and represents Ukraine at international competitions. She competed at the 2015 UEC European Track Championships in the team pursuit event and at the 2016 UEC European Track Championships in the team pursuit event.
