= Ina Savenka =

Belarusian cyclist (born 1994)

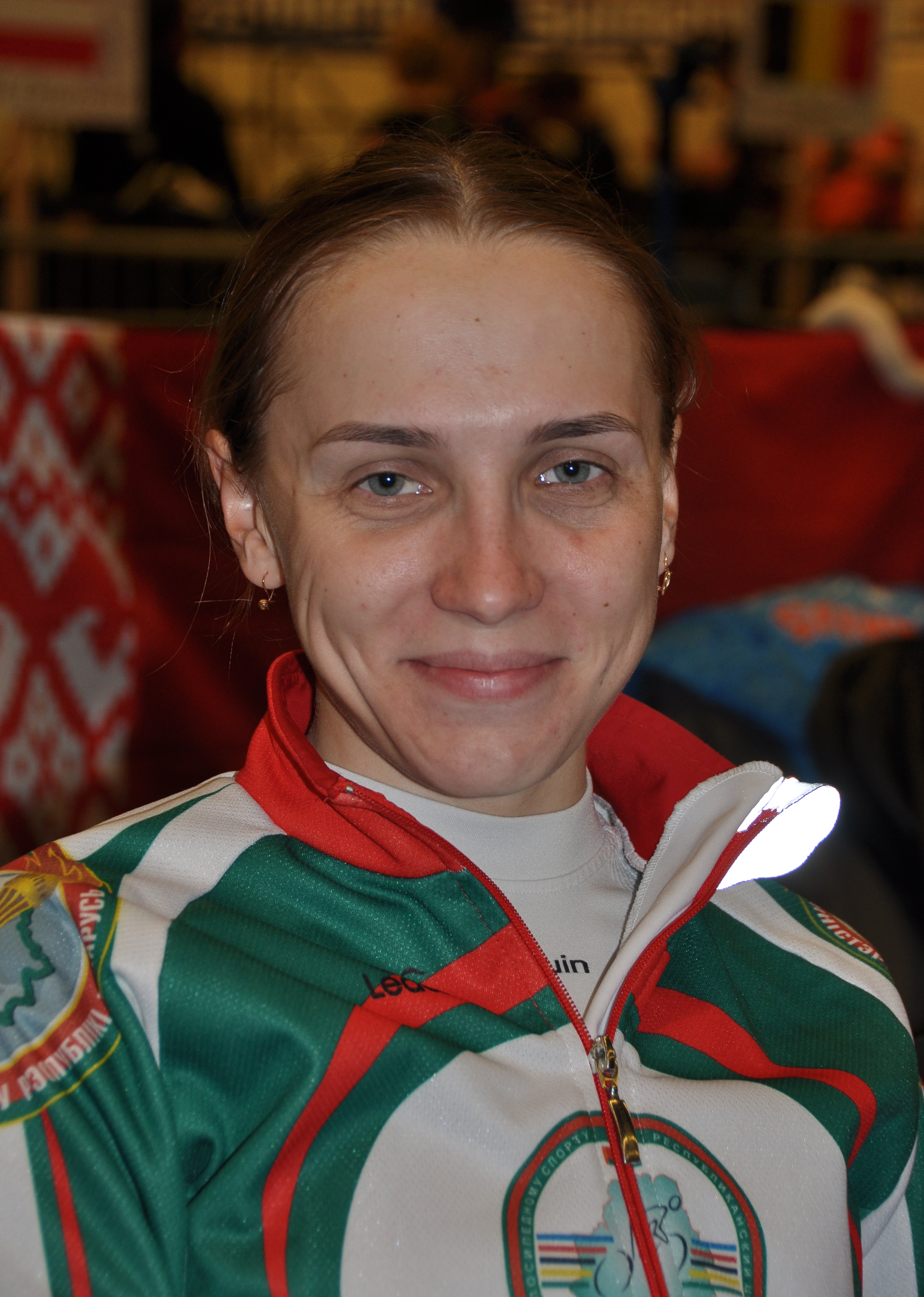
- Savenka in 2018

Personal information
- Full name: Ina Savenka; Belarusian: Іна Савенка
- Born: 5 August 1994 (age 32)

Cycling career
- Sport: Cycling
- Disciplines: Road; Track
- Role: Rider
- Rider type: Pursuitist (track)

Professional teams
- 2018–2019: Minsk Cycling Club
- 2021: Ferei–CCN
Medal record
Representing Belarus
European Track Championships
Silver medal – second place	2018 Glasgow	Points race
Bronze medal – third place	2015 Grenchen	Team pursuit

Ina Savenka (Belarusian: Іна Савенка; born 5 August 1994) is a Belarusian professional racing cyclist, who most recently rode for UCI Women's Continental Team Ferei–CCN. She rode at the 2015 UCI Track Cycling World Championships.

== Major results ==
=== Track ===
2012
3rd Team pursuit, National Track Championships
2014
Grand Prix Minsk

1st Points race
1st Scratch
3rd Omnium

UEC Under-23 European Track Championships

2nd Omnium
2nd Team pursuit (with Volha Masiukovich, Palina Pivavarava and Marina Shmayankova)

2015
UEC Under-23 European Track Championships

1st Team pursuit (with Katsiaryna Piatrouskaya, Palina Pivavarava and Marina Shmayankova)
2nd Points race

1st Points race, Grand Prix Minsk
3rd Team pursuit, UEC European Track Championships (with Katsiaryna Piatrouskaya, Palina Pivavarava and Marina Shmayankova)
2016
1st Scratch, Grand Prix Minsk
UEC Under-23 European Track Championships

2nd Omnium
3rd Individual pursuit

2017
National Track Championships

1st Team pursuit
1st Omnium
1st Individual pursuit
2nd Points race
3rd Scratch

3rd Points race, International Track Race Panevežys
2018
National Track Championships

1st Individual pursuit
3rd Scratch

2nd Points race, UEC European Track Championships
2019
National Track Championships

1st Omnium
1st Team pursuit
1st Madison
1st Team sprint
3rd Individual pursuit
3rd Points race

2020
National Track Championships

1st Points race
2nd Individual pursuit
2nd Madison (with Karalina Savenka)
2nd Team pursuit
3rd Omnium

2021
National Track Championships

1st Scratch
2nd Individual pursuit
2nd Team pursuit
2nd Madison

=== Road ===
2014
5th Road race, National Road Championships
2015
3rd Road race, National Road Championships
2016
National Road Championships

4th Road race
5th Time trial

9th VR Women ITT
2017
National Road Championships

2nd Time trial
3rd Road race

7th VR Women ITT
2018
2nd Time trial, National Road Championships
10th Overall Panorama Guizhou International Women's Road Cycling Race
2019
1st Grand Prix Gazipaşa
2nd Kyivska Sotka Women Challenge
10th Overall Tour of Uppsala
2020
2nd Time trial, National Road Championships
2021
10th Grand Prix Mediterrennean WE
