= Olena Sharha =

Ukrainian cyclist

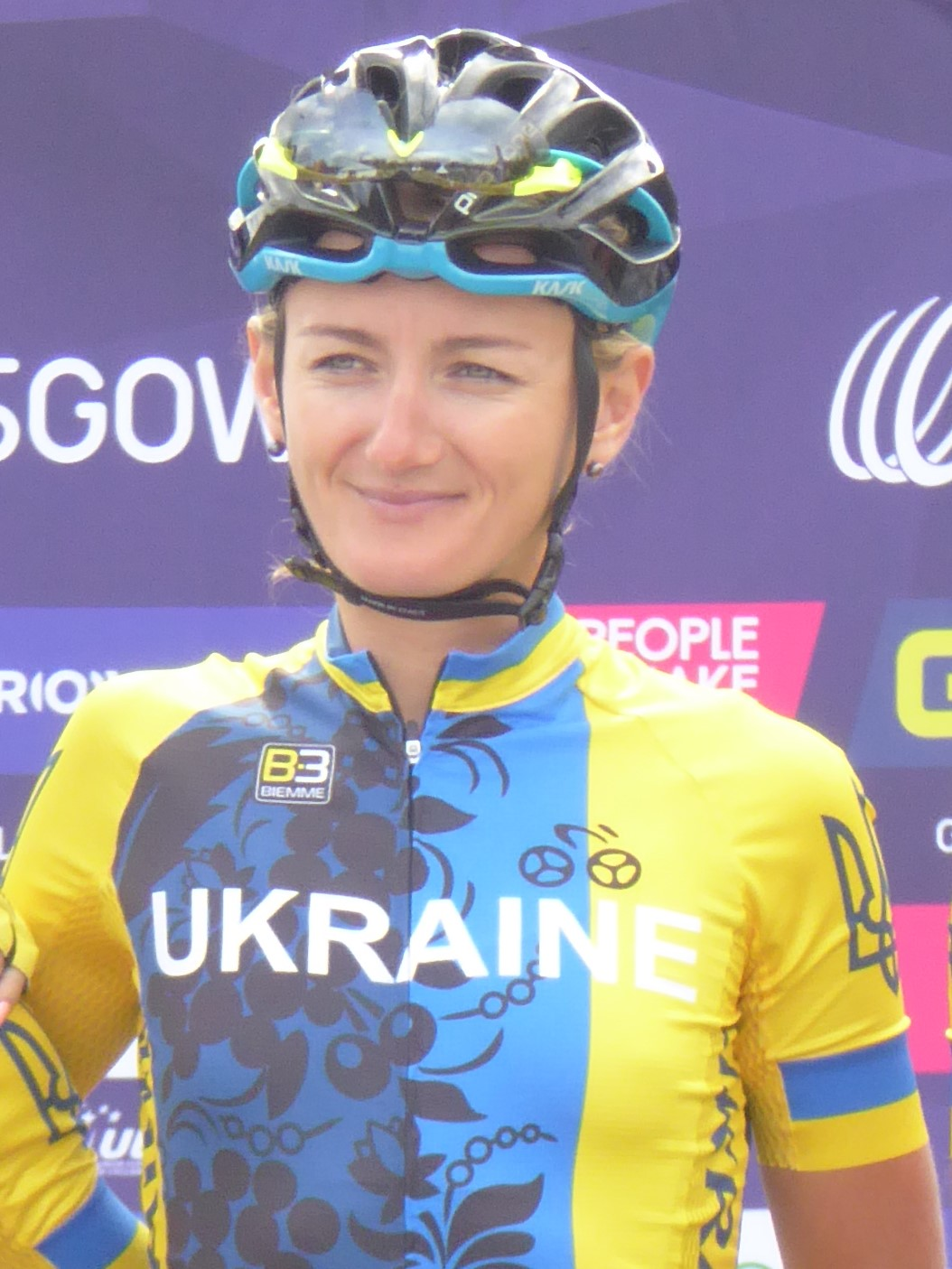
- Sharha at the 2018 European Road Cycling Championships.

Personal information
- Full name: Olena Sharha
- Born: 21 December 1986 (age 39) Ukraine

Cycling career
- Sport: Cycling
- Disciplines: Road; Track
- Role: Rider

Amateur team
- 2022–?: Lviv Cycling Team

Professional team
- 2019–2021: Lviv Cycling Team

Olena Sharha (born 21 December 1986) is a Ukrainian road cyclist, who rides for Ukrainian amateur team Lviv Cycling Team. She participated at the 2012 UCI Road World Championships.

== Major results ==
2008
9th Tour of Chongming Island Time Trial
10th Grand Prix de Dottignies
2009
3rd Time trial, National Road Championships
2010
9th GP Liberazione
2011
2nd Golan I
2nd Golan II
2012
7th Overall Gracia-Orlová
7th Grand Prix GSB
8th Grand Prix el Salvador
2013
3rd Time trial, National Road Championships
2014
7th Overall Tour of Zhoushan Island
2015
3rd Time trial, National Road Championships
2016
5th VR Women ITT
6th Horizon Park Women Challenge
2018
2nd Time trial, National Road Championships
2019
1st Grand Prix Velo Alanya
2nd Chabany Race
3rd Road race, National Road Championships
3rd VR Women ITT
2020
3rd Road race, National Road Championships
9th Grand Prix Alanya
9th Grand Prix Gazipaşa
2021
3rd Road race, National Road Championships
3rd Grand Prix Velo Erciyes
