= Marina Shmayankova =

Belarusian cyclist (born 1993)

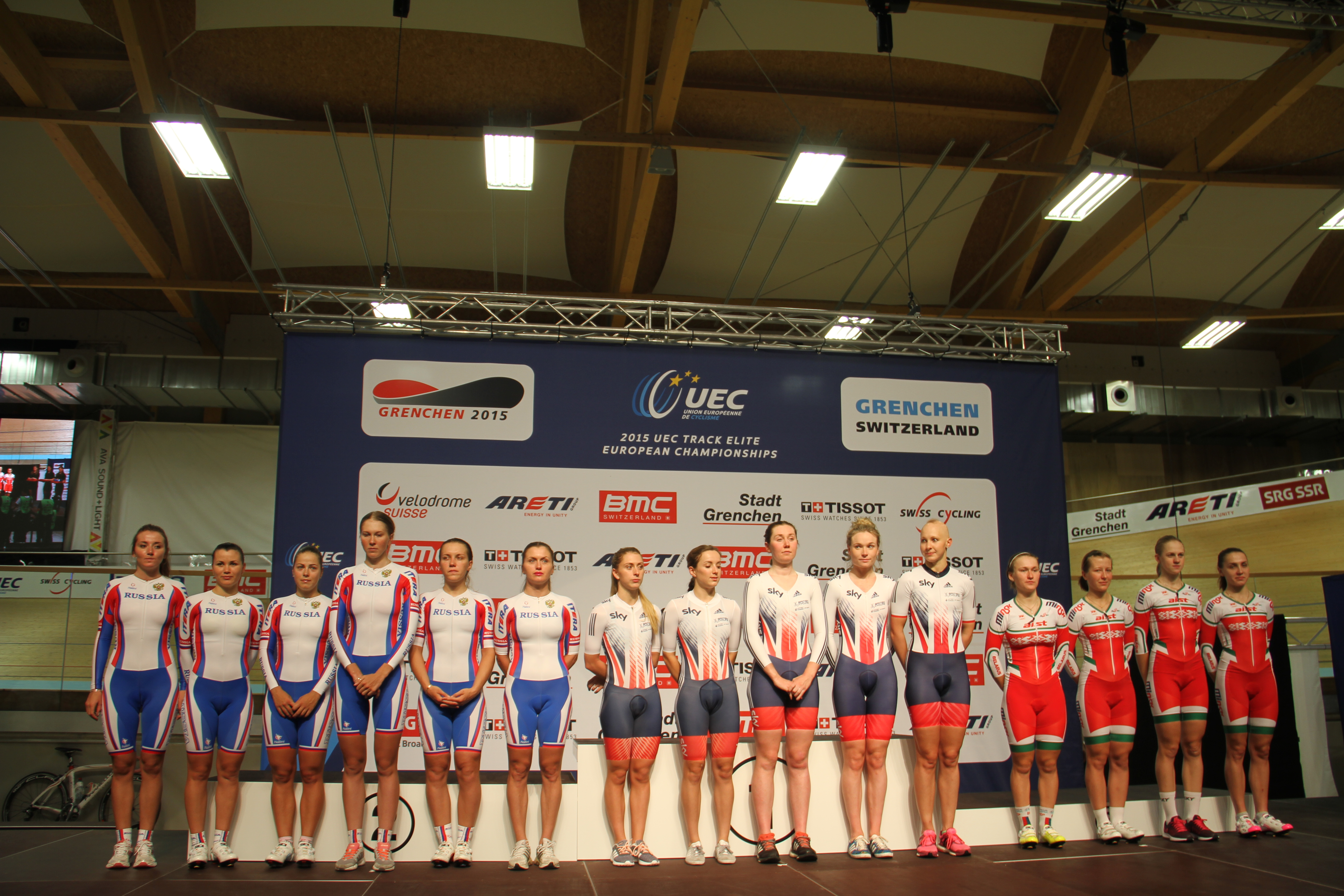
- On the podium at the 2015 European Track Championships

Personal information
- Full name: Marina Shmayankova
- Born: 15 January 1993 (age 33)

Cycling career
- Sport: Cycling
- Current team: Ferei–CCN
- Disciplines: Track; Road
- Role: Rider

Professional team
- 2021–: Ferei–CCN
Medal record
Representing Belarus
European Track Championships
Bronze medal – third place	2015 Grenchen	Team pursuit

Marina Shmayankova (born 15 January 1993) is a Belarusian professional racing cyclist, who currently rides for UCI Women's Continental Team Ferei–CCN. She rode at the 2015 UCI Track Cycling World Championships.

== Major results ==
2014
2nd Scratch, Grand Prix Minsk
2nd Team Pursuit, UEC European Under-23 Track Championships (with Volha Masiukovich, Palina Pivavarava and Ina Savenka)
2015
UEC European Under-23 Track Championships

1st Team Pursuit (with Katsiaryna Piatrouskaya, Palina Pivavarava and Ina Savenka)
3rd Scratch Race

3rd Team Pursuit, UEC European Track Championships (with Katsiaryna Piatrouskaya, Palina Pivavarava and Ina Savenka)
3rd Scratch Race, Grand Prix Minsk
