= Volha Masiukovich =

Belarusian cyclist

Personal information
- Born: 29 February 1992 (age 34)

Cycling career
- Sport: Cycling
- Discipline: Track cycling
- Role: Rider
- Rider type: endurance

Volha Masiukovich (born 29 February 1992) is a Belarusian female track cyclist.

She competed at the 2013 and 2014 UCI Track Cycling World Championships.

== Career results ==
2014
2nd Team Pursuit, UEC European U23 Track Championships (with Palina Pivavarava, Ina Savenka and Marina Shmayankova)
3rd Scratch Race, Grand Prix Minsk
