= 2020 UEC European Track Championships – Women's team pursuit =

Women's team pursuit at the 2020 UEC European Track Championships
- Venue: Kolodruma, Plovdiv
- Date: 11–12 November
- Competitors: 19 from 4 nations
- Winning time: 4:10.437

Medalists
gold medal	Josie Knight; Laura Kenny; Katie Archibald; Neah Evans; Elinor Barker	Great Britain
silver medal	Martina Alzini; Elisa Balsamo; Chiara Consonni; Vittoria Guazzini; Rachele Barbieri	Italy
bronze medal	Anna Nahirna; Tetyana Klimchenko; Viktoriya Bondar; Yuliia Biriukova	Ukraine

The women's team pursuit competition at the 2020 UEC European Track Championships was held on 11 and 12 November 2020.

== Results ==
=== Qualifying ===
All teams advanced to the first round.

Rank	Name	Nation	Time	Behind	Notes
1	Neah Evans; Laura Kenny; Katie Archibald; Elinor Barker	Great Britain	4:13.923		
2	Martina Alzini; Elisa Balsamo; Chiara Consonni; Vittoria Guazzini	Italy	4:18.209	+4.286	
3	Anna Nahirna; Tetyana Klimchenko; Viktoriya Bondar; Yuliia Biriukova	Ukraine	4:36.104	+22.181	
4	Tania Calvo; Ziortza Isasi; Eukene Larrarte; Laura Rodríguez	Spain	4:38.682	+24.759	

=== First round ===
First round heats were held as follows:

Heat 1: 1st v 4th fastest
Heat 2: 2nd v 3rd fastest

The winners of each heat proceeded to the gold medal race. The remaining two teams proceeded to the bronze medal race.

Rank	Heat	Name	Nation	Time	Notes
1	1	Josie Knight; Laura Kenny; Katie Archibald; Elinor Barker	Great Britain		QG
2	2	Rachele Barbieri; Elisa Balsamo; Chiara Consonni; Vittoria Guazzini	Italy		QG
3	2	Anna Nahirna; Tetyana Klimchenko; Viktoriya Bondar; Yuliia Biriukova	Ukraine		QB
4	1	Sandra Alonso; Ziortza Isasi; Eukene Larrarte; Laura Rodríguez	Spain		QB

=== Finals ===
Rank	Name	Nation	Time	Behind	Notes
Gold medal final
1st place, gold medalist(s)	Josie Knight; Laura Kenny; Katie Archibald; Neah Evans	Great Britain	4:10.437		
2nd place, silver medalist(s)	Martina Alzini; Elisa Balsamo; Chiara Consonni; Vittoria Guazzini	Italy	4:13.632	+3.194	
Bronze medal final
3rd place, bronze medalist(s)	Anna Nahirna; Tetyana Klimchenko; Viktoriya Bondar; Yuliia Biriukova	Ukraine	4:33.833		
4	Sandra Alonso; Ziortza Isasi; Eukene Larrarte; Tania Calvo	Spain	4:37.341	+3.508	
