= 2020 UEC European Track Championships – Women's scratch =

Women's scratch at the 2020 UEC European Track Championships
- Venue: Kolodruma, Plovdiv
- Date: 11 November
- Competitors: 14 from 14 nations

Medalists
gold medal	Martina Fidanza	Italy
silver medal	Hanna Tserakh	Belarus
bronze medal	Tetyana Klimchenko	Ukraine

The women's scratch competition at the 2020 UEC European Track Championships was held on 11 November 2020. Hanna Tserakh of Belarus attacked with 13 laps to go and stayed in the front until the end, however Martina Fidanza of Italy accelerated with two laps to go, managing to overtake Tserakh right on the line, taking the title.

== Results ==
First rider across the line without a net lap loss wins.

Rank	Name	Nation	Laps down
1st place, gold medalist(s)	Martina Fidanza	Italy	
2nd place, silver medalist(s)	Hanna Tserakh	Belarus	
3rd place, bronze medalist(s)	Tetyana Klimchenko	Ukraine	
4	Neah Evans	Great Britain	
5	Diana Klimova	Russia	
6	Aline Seitz	Switzerland	
7	Tania Calvo	Spain	
8	Olivija Baleišytė	Lithuania	
9	Karolina Karasiewicz	Poland	
10	Maria Martins	Portugal	
11	Alžbeta Bačíková	Slovakia	
12	Argiro Milaki	Greece	
13	Johanna Kitti Borissza	Hungary	
14	Petra Ševčíková	Czech Republic	
