= Viktoriya Bondar =

Ukrainian cyclist (born 1995)

Personal information
- Full name: Viktoriya Bondar
- Born: 25 September 1995 (age 31)

Cycling career
- Sport: Cycling
- Disciplines: Road; Track
- Role: Rider

Professional team
- 2019–2021: Lviv Cycling Team
Medal record
Women's track cycling
Representing Ukraine
European Championships
Bronze medal – third place	2020 Plovdiv	Team pursuit

Viktoriya Bondar (born 25 September 1995) is a Ukrainian road and track cyclist, who rode for UCI Women's Continental Team Lviv Cycling Team. Representing Ukraine at international competitions, Bondar competed at the 2016 UEC European Track Championships in the scratch event.

== Major results ==
2014
Grand Prix Galichyna

2nd Team sprint (with Valeriia Zalizna)
3rd Keirin

2016
3rd Points race, Grand Prix Galichyna
2017
Grand Prix Galichyna

1st Madison (with Ana Nahirna)
1st Omnium
