= Hanna Tserakh =

Belarusian cyclist (born 1998)

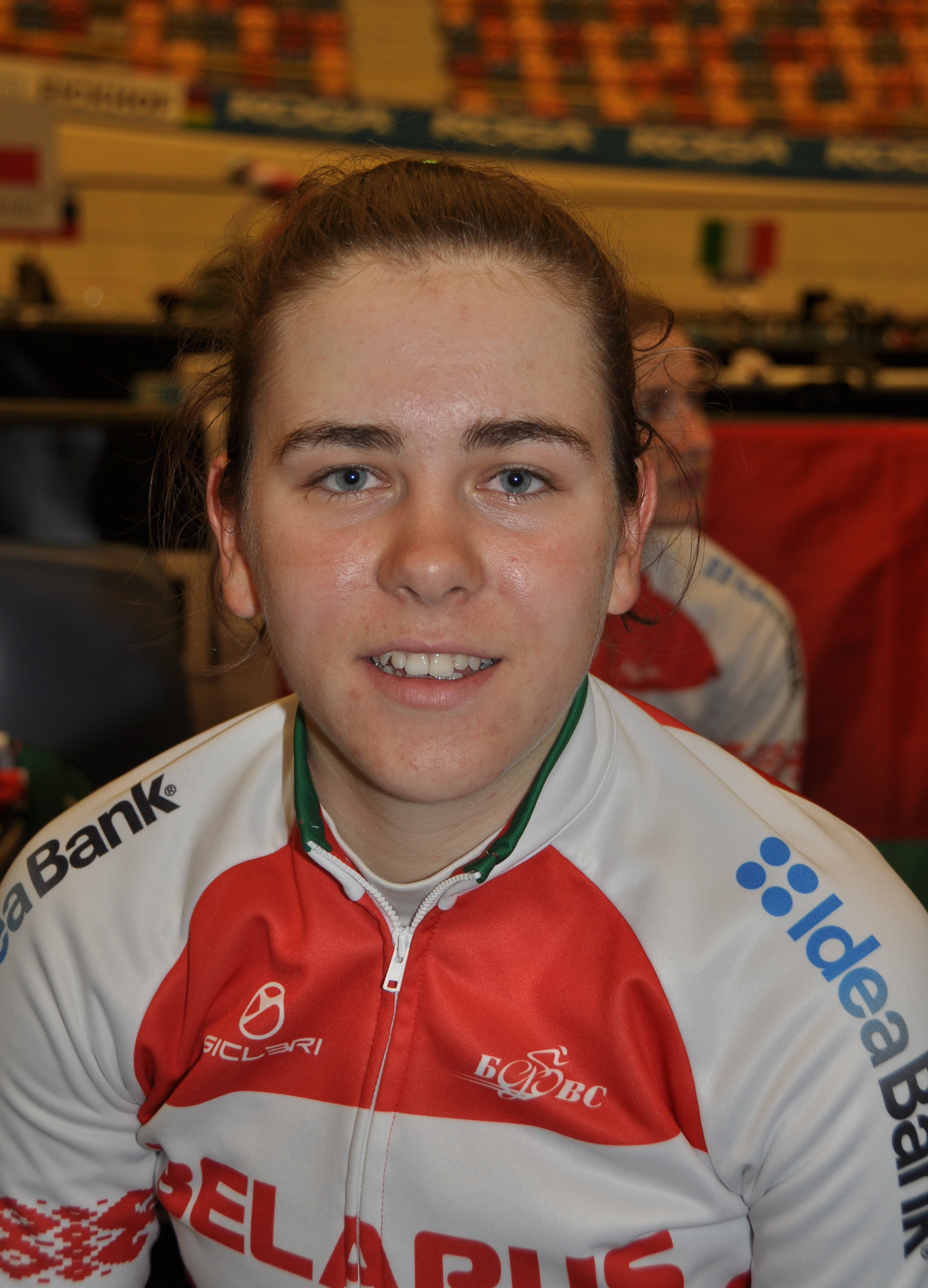
- Tserakh in 2018

Personal information
- Full name: Hanna Tserakh
- Born: 7 September 1998 (age 28) Minsk, Belarus

Cycling career
- Sport: Cycling
- Current team: Aromitalia Vaiano
- Disciplines: Road; Track
- Role: Rider

Professional teams
- 2017–2022: Minsk Cycling Club
- 2023: Li-Ning Star
- 2024: BTC City Ljubljana Zhiraf Ambedo
- 2025–: Aromitalia 3T Vaiano
Medal record
Representing Belarus
Women's track cycling
European Championships
Silver medal – second place	2020 Plovdiv	Scratch
European Games
Bronze medal – third place	2019 Minsk	Scratch

Hanna Tserakh (born 7 September 1998) is a Belarusian racing cyclist, who currently rides for UCI Women's Continental Team Aromitalia Vaiano. She rode in the women's scratch event at the 2018 UCI Track Cycling World Championships.

== Major results ==
2017
2nd Road race, National Road Championships
8th VR Women ITT
2018
3rd Road race, National Road Championships
3rd Overall Panorama Guizhou International Women's Road Cycling Race
2019
1st Kiev Olimpic Ring Women Race
National Road Championships

2nd Road race
4th Time trial

3rd Kievskaya Sotka Women Challenge
7th Tour of Guangxi
9th VR Women ITT
2020
1st Grand Prix Manavgat–Side
2nd Scratch, UEC European Track Championships
2nd Time trial, National Under-23 Road Championships
2nd Grand Prix Alanya
4th Grand Prix Velo Alanya
2021
1st Grand Prix Mediterrennean WE
National Road Championships

2nd Road race
2nd Time trial

3rd Grand Prix Velo Manavgat
2022
3rd Grand Prix Justiniano Race
8th Grand Prix Velo Alanya
2023
National Road Championships

1st Road race
1st Time trial

4th Overall Tour of Chongming Island

1st Mountains classification
1st Stage 2

2024
National Road Championships

1st Road race
1st Time trial
1st Criterium

1st Belgrade GP Woman Tour
7th Gran Premio della Liberazione
