= Robyn Stewart =

Irish cyclist

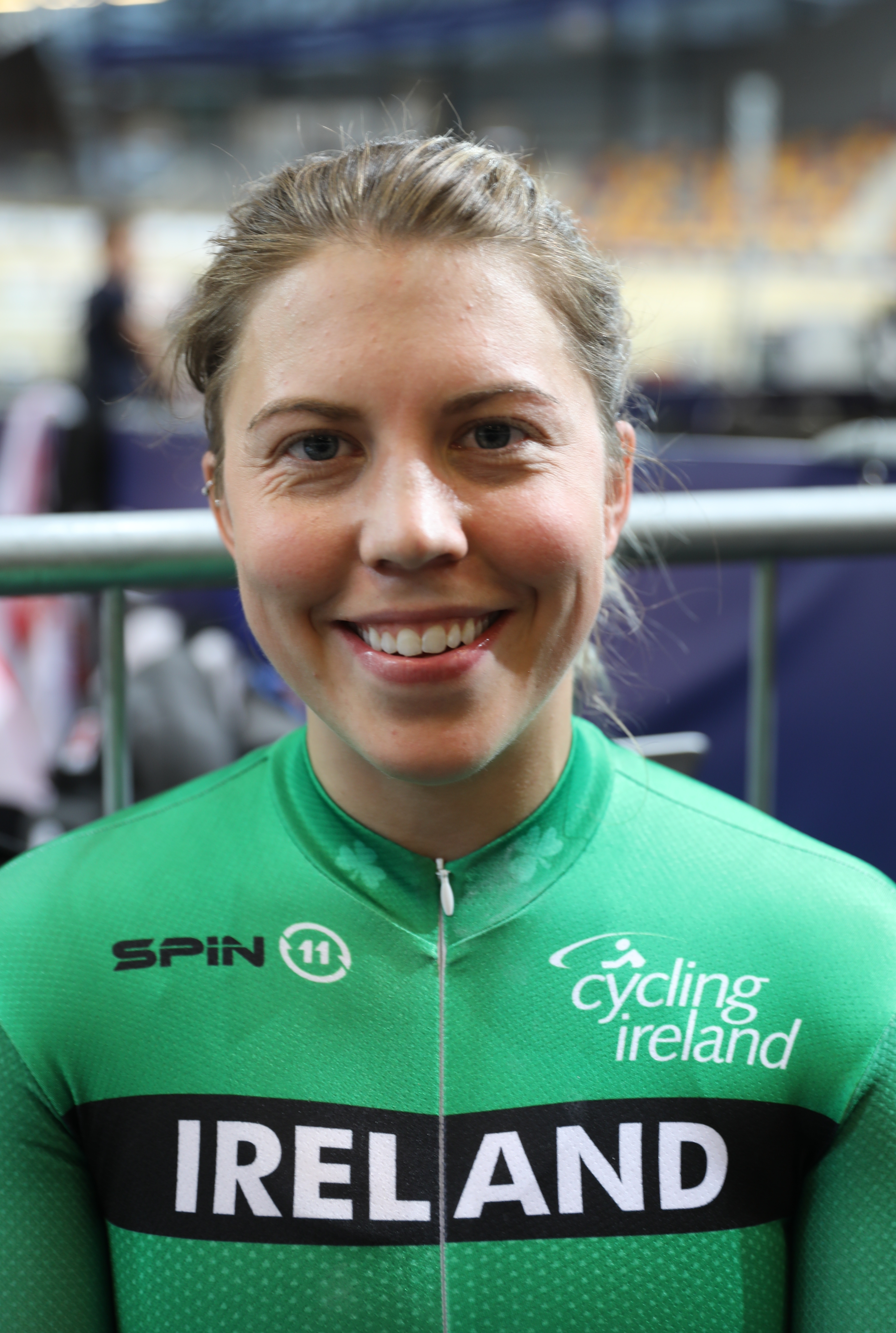
- Robyn Stewart (2019)

Personal information
- Born: 10 April 1990 (age 36) Belfast, Northern Ireland

Cycling career
- Sport: Cycling
- Discipline: Track cycling
Medal record
Women's track cycling
Representing Ireland

Robyn Stewart (born 10 April 1990 in Belfast, Northern Ireland) is a female track cyclist, representing Ireland and Northern Ireland at international competitions. She competed at the 2016 UEC European Track Championships in the 500m time trial event and team sprint event. Stewart competed in the sprint and keirin at the 2018 Commonwealth Games, representing Northern Ireland.

== Career results ==
2015
2nd Keirin, Revolution - Round 2, Manchester
2016
Milton International Challenge

2nd 500m Time Trial
3rd Keirin

3rd Team Sprint, Grand Prix of Poland (with Emma Baird)
2017
INTERNATIONAL PICENO SPRINT CUP

1st Sprint
3rd Keirin

Dublin International

2nd Keirin
2nd Sprint

3rd 500m Time Trial, Cottbuser SprintCup
Siberne Eule von Ludwigshafen

3rd Keirin
3rd Sprint
