= Katsiaryna Piatrouskaya =

Belarusian cyclist

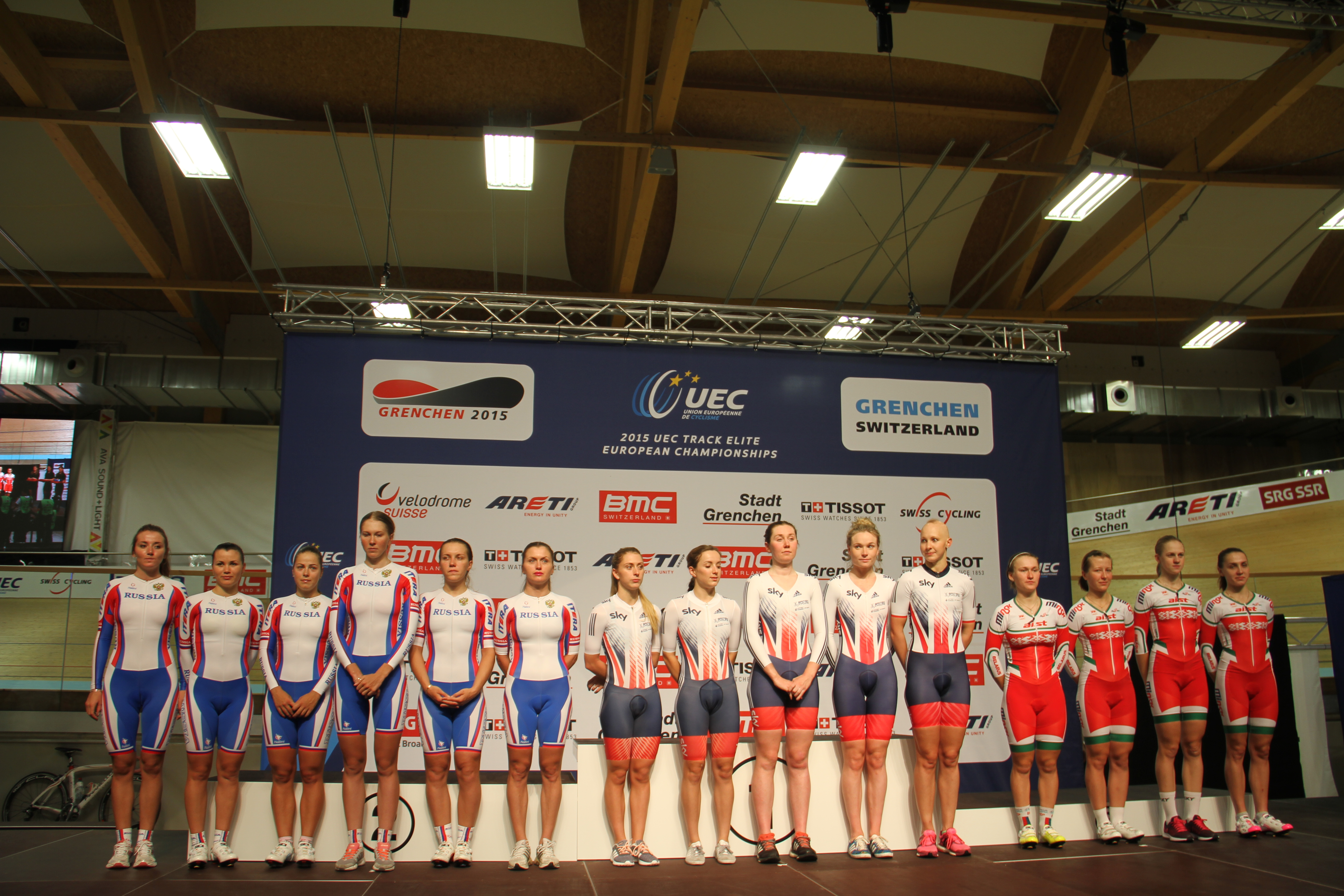
- On the podium at the 2015 European Track Championships

Personal information
- Born: Belarus

Cycling career
- Sport: Cycling
- Disciplines: Road cycling Track cycling
Medal record
Representing Belarus
European Track Championships
Bronze medal – third place	2015 Grenchen	Team pursuit

Katsiaryna Piatrouskaya is a road cyclist and track cyclist from Belarus.

As a junior Piatrouskaya participated at the 2012 UCI Road World Championships and 2013 UCI Road World Championships. In 2015, she won the bronze medal on the track in the team pursuit at the 2015 UEC European Track Championships in Grenchen, Switzerland.

== Career results ==
2015
1st Team Pursuit, UEC European U23 Track Championships (with Palina Pivavarava, Ina Savenka and Marina Shmayankova)
3rd Team Pursuit, UEC European Track Championships (with Polina Pivovarova, Ina Savenka and Marina Shmayankova)
2017
2nd Individual Pursuit, Grand Prix Minsk
