= Palina Pivavarava =

Belarusian track cyclist (born 1994)

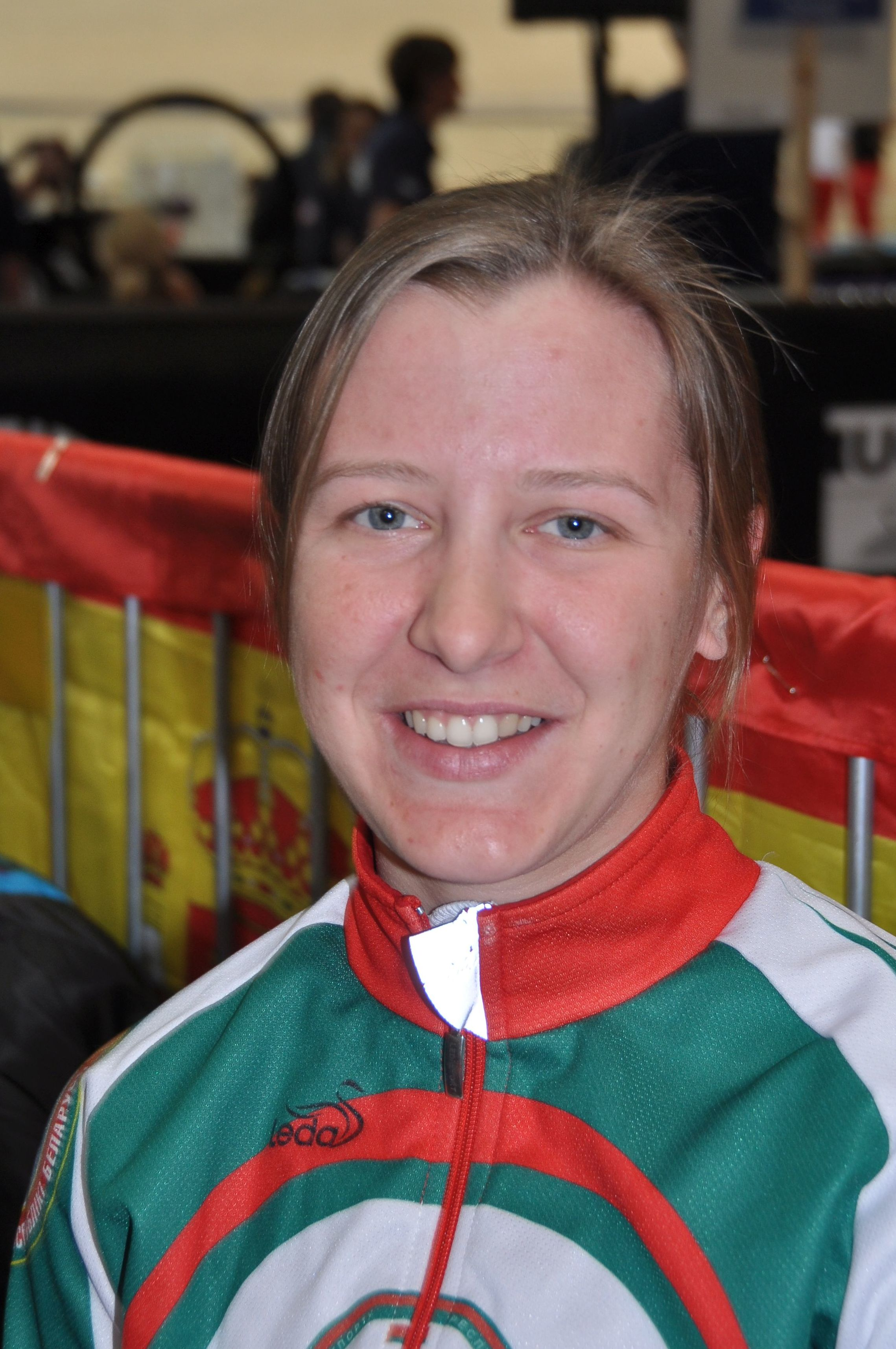
- Palina Pivavarava (2018)

Personal information
- Full name: Palina Pivavarava; Belarusian: Паліна Піваварава
- Born: 12 October 1994 (age 32) Belarus

Cycling career
- Sport: Cycling
- Disciplines: Road; Track
- Role: Rider

Professional team
- 2019: Minsk Cycling Club
Medal record
Representing Belarus
European Track Championships
| Bronze medal – third place | 2015 Grenchen | Team pursuit |

Palina Pivavarava (Belarusian: Паліна Піваварава; born 12 October 1994) is a track cyclist from Belarus, who most recently rode for UCI Women's Team Minsk Cycling Club. In 2015, she won the bronze medal in the team pursuit at the 2015 UEC European Track Championships in Grenchen, Switzerland. She also rode at the 2015 UCI Track Cycling World Championships.

== Career results ==
2014
2nd Team pursuit, UEC European Under-23 Track Championships (with Volha Masiukovich, Ina Savenka and Marina Shmayankova)
2015
UEC European Under-23 Track Championships

1st Team pursuit (with Katsiaryna Piatrouskaya, Ina Savenka and Marina Shmayankova)
3rd Points race

3rd Team pursuit, UEC European Track Championships (with Katsiaryna Piatrouskaya, Ina Savenka and Marina Shmayankova)
