= Eleanor Richardson =

Scottish cyclist

Personal information
- Born: 1 July 1986 (age 40)
- Height: 166 cm (65 in)
- Weight: 57 kg (126 lb)

Cycling career
- Sport: Cycling
- Discipline: Track cycling

Eleanor Richardson (born 1 July 1986) is a Scottish female track cyclist, representing Great Britain and Scotland at international competitions. Richardson represented Scotland at the 2014 Commonwealth Games. She competed at the 2015 UCI London Track Cycling World Cup and the 2016 UEC European Track Championships in the 500m time trial event and team sprint event. A former 200m Scottish Schools National Champion in athletics, Eleanor won ten Scottish National titles in Track Cycling in the sprint disciplines before retiring from competitive sport.[3] Eleanor is a Clinical Specialist Physiotherapist with a BSc(Hons) in Physiotherapy and an MSc in Advanced Musculoskeletal Physiotherapy Practice.[3]

== Career results ==
2014
Hong Kong International Track Cup

1st 500m Time Trial
3rd Keirin
3rd Sprint

3rd Sprint, Hong Kong International Track Classic
1st 500m tt
1st Sprint
1st Team Sprint, Scottish National Track Cycling Championships
8th 500m tt, Commonwealth Games Glasgow
2015
3rd Sprint, Revolution - Round 4, Glasgow
3rd 500m tt
3rd Team Sprint, British National Track Cycling Championships
2016
5th Team Sprint, European Track Cycling Championships
1st 500m tt, Scottish National Track Cycling Championships
