= Gloria Manzoni =

Italian racing cyclist

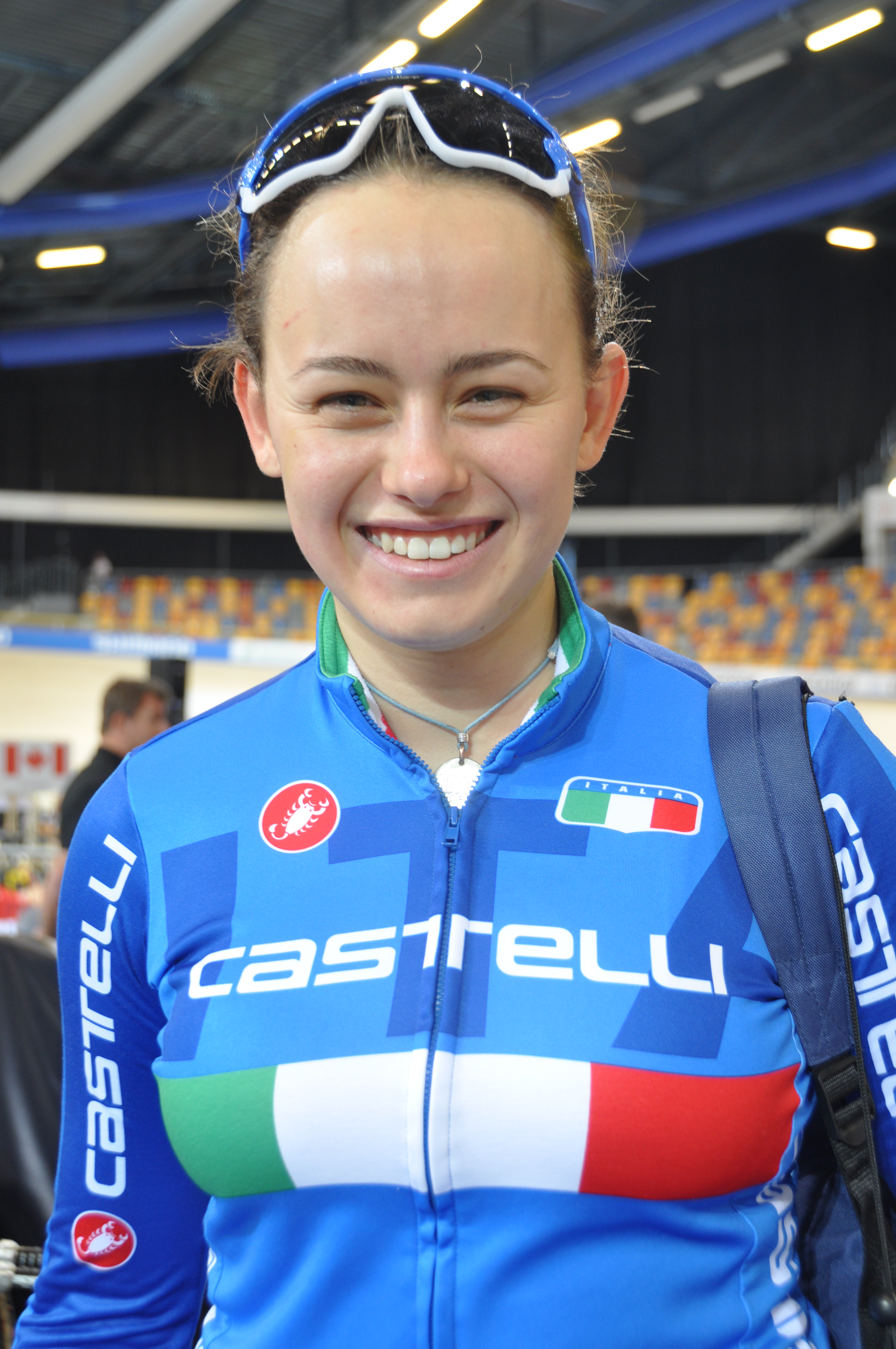
- Manzoni in 2016

Personal information
- Full name: Gloria Manzoni
- Born: 25 April 1998 (age 28)

Cycling career
- Sport: Cycling
- Disciplines: Road; Track
- Role: Rider

Professional team
- 2018–2019: Eurotarget–Bianchi–Vitasana

Gloria Manzoni (born 25 April 1998) is an Italian road and track cyclist, who last rode for UCI Women's Team Eurotarget–Bianchi–Vittoria. Representing Italy at international competitions, Manzoni competed at the 2016 UEC European Track Championships in the 500m time trial event and team sprint event.

== Major results ==
2016
Trofeu Ciutat de Barcelona

3rd Keirin
3rd Sprint
