= Ferei–CCN (women's team) =

Belarusian cycling team

Team information
- UCI code: FCT (2021–)
- Registered: Belarus
- Founded: 2021
- Discipline: Road
- Status: UCI Women's Continental Team (2021–)
- Bicycles: Cervelo (2021–)

Team name history
- 2021–: Ferei–CCN

Ferei–CCN is a Belarusian women's road bicycle racing team, established in 2021, which participates in elite women's races.

After the 2022 Russian invasion of Ukraine, the UCI said that Belarusian teams are forbidden from competing in international events.

== National champions ==
2021
Belarus Track (Scratch race), Ina Savenka
Belarus Track (Elimination race), Aksana Salauyeva
