= Tetyana Klimchenko =

Ukrainian cyclist (born 1994)

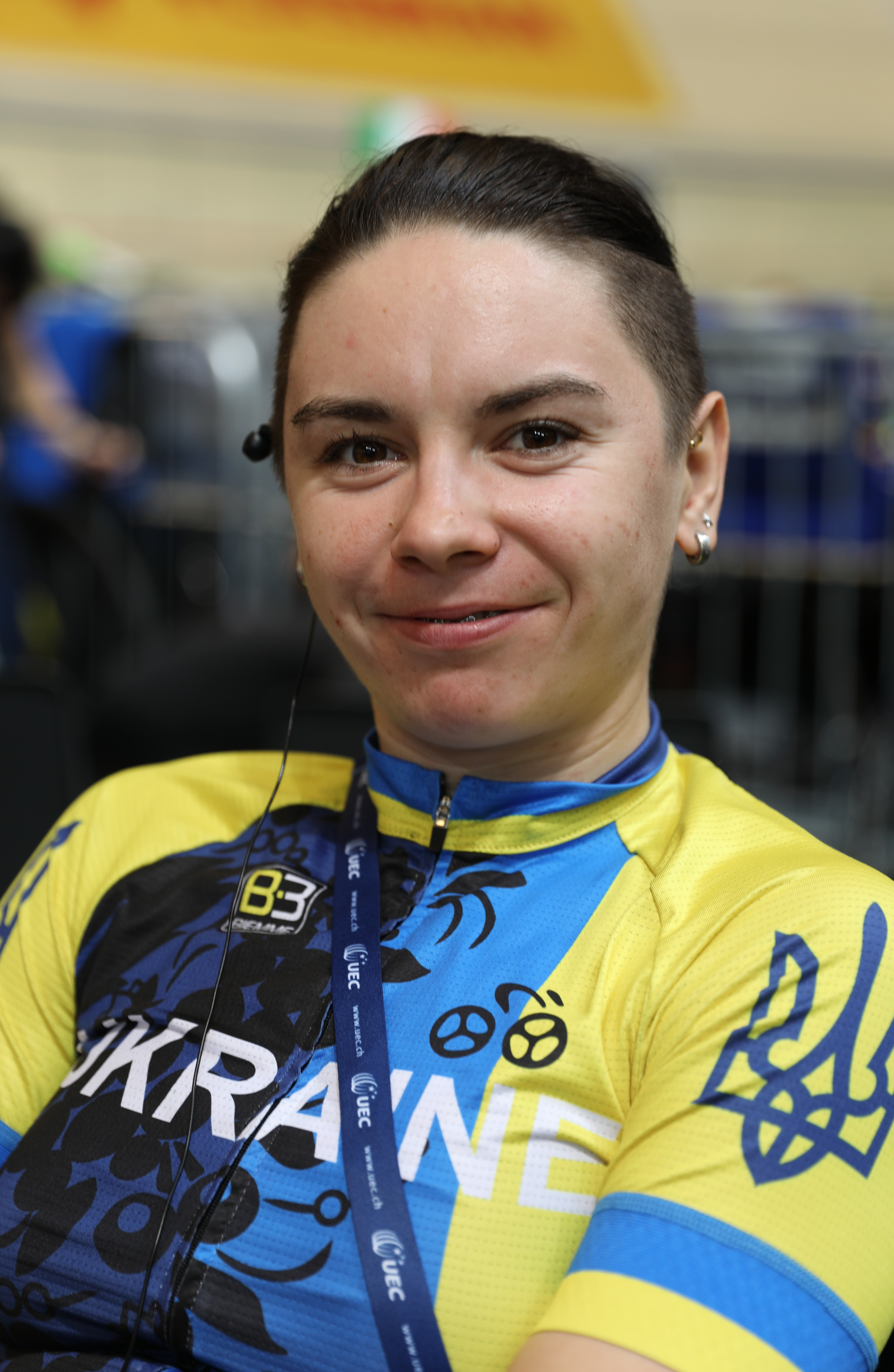
- Klimchenko in 2019.

Personal information
- Full name: Tetyana Igorivna Klimchenko; Ukrainian: Тетя́на І́горівна Клі́мченко
- Born: 8 May 1994 (age 32) Chervonohrad, Ukraine

Cycling career
- Sport: Cycling
- Disciplines: Road; Track
- Role: Rider

Professional team
- 2019–2020: Lviv Cycling Team
Medal record
Representing Ukraine
Women's track cycling
European Championships
Bronze medal – third place	2020 Plovdiv	Scratch
Bronze medal – third place	2020 Plovdiv	Team pursuit

Tetyana Igorivna Klimchenko (Ukrainian: Тетя́на І́горівна Клі́мченко; born 8 May 1994) is a Ukrainian professional racing cyclist, who rode for UCI Women's Continental Team Lviv Cycling Team. She rode at the 2015 UCI Track Cycling World Championships.

== Major results ==
2013
Panevezys

3rd Keirin
3rd Omnium

2014
2nd Scratch, Grand Prix Galichyna
3rd Points race, Panevezys
3rd Omnium, UEC European Under-23 Track Championships
2016
2nd Scratch, Grand Prix Galichyna
3rd Scratch, 6 giorni delle rose - Fiorenzuola
2017
1st Scratch, Grand Prix Minsk
2nd Scratch, UEC European Track Championships
2020
3rd Scratch, UEC European Track Championships
