= Minsk Cycling Club (women's team) =

Belarusian cycling team

Team information
- UCI code: MCC
- Registered: Belarus
- Founded: 2017
- Discipline: Road
- Status: UCI Women's Team (2017–2019); UCI Women's Continental Team (2020–present)

Team name history
- 2017–: Minsk Cycling Club

Minsk Cycling Club is a UCI Women's Continental Team founded in 2017 and based in Belarus.

After the 2022 Russian invasion of Ukraine, the UCI said that Belarusian teams are forbidden from competing in international events.

== Team roster ==
As of 24 January 2021.

Rider	Date of birth
Alina Abramenka (BLR)	26 October 2000 (age 25)
Darya Dziakola (BLR)	29 December 2000 (age 25)
Nastassia Kiptsikava (BLR)	10 August 1999 (age 27)
Anhelina Krasko (BLR)	16 December 2000 (age 25)

Rider	Date of birth
Taisa Naskovich (BLR)	19 September 1995 (age 30)
Karalina Savenka (BLR)	21 April 1998 (age 28)
Tatsiana Sharakova (BLR)	31 July 1984 (age 42)
Hanna Tserakh (BLR)	7 September 1998 (age 27)

== Major results ==
2018
Stage 3 Tour of Eftalia Hotels & Velo Alanya, Karalina Savenka
Team classification Panorama Guizhou International Women's Road Cycling Race
2019
Grand Prix Gazipasa, Ina Savenka
Grand Prix Alanya, Tatsiana Sharakova
2020
Stage 3 Dubai Women's Tour, Tatsiana Sharakova
Grand Prix Manavgat–Side, Hanna Tserah

== National champions ==
2017
Belarus Time Trial, Tatsiana Sharakova
Belarus Road Race, Tatsiana Sharakova
Belarus Track (Team sprint), Kristina Bialetskaya
Belarus Track (Individual sprint), Tatsiana Sharakova
Belarus Track (Points race), Tatsiana Sharakova
Belarus Track (Scratch race), Hanna Tserah
2018
Belarus Track (Individual pursuit), Ina Savenka
Belarus Track (Scratch race), Anastasiya Dzedzikava
Belarus Time Trial, Tatsiana Sharakova
2019
Belarus Time Trial, Tatsiana Sharakova
Belarus Road Race, Tatsiana Sharakova
2020
Belarus Time Trial, Tatsiana Sharakova
Belarus Road Race, Tatsiana Sharakova
Belarus Track (Team pursuit), Darya Dziakola
Belarus Track (Team pursuit), Taisa Naskovich
Belarus Track (Team sprint), Darya Dziakola
Belarus Track (Team sprint), Taisa Naskovich
2021
Belarus Time Trial, Tatsiana Sharakova
Belarus Road Race, Tatsiana Sharakova
