= Karalina Biryuk =

Belarusian cyclist (born 1998)

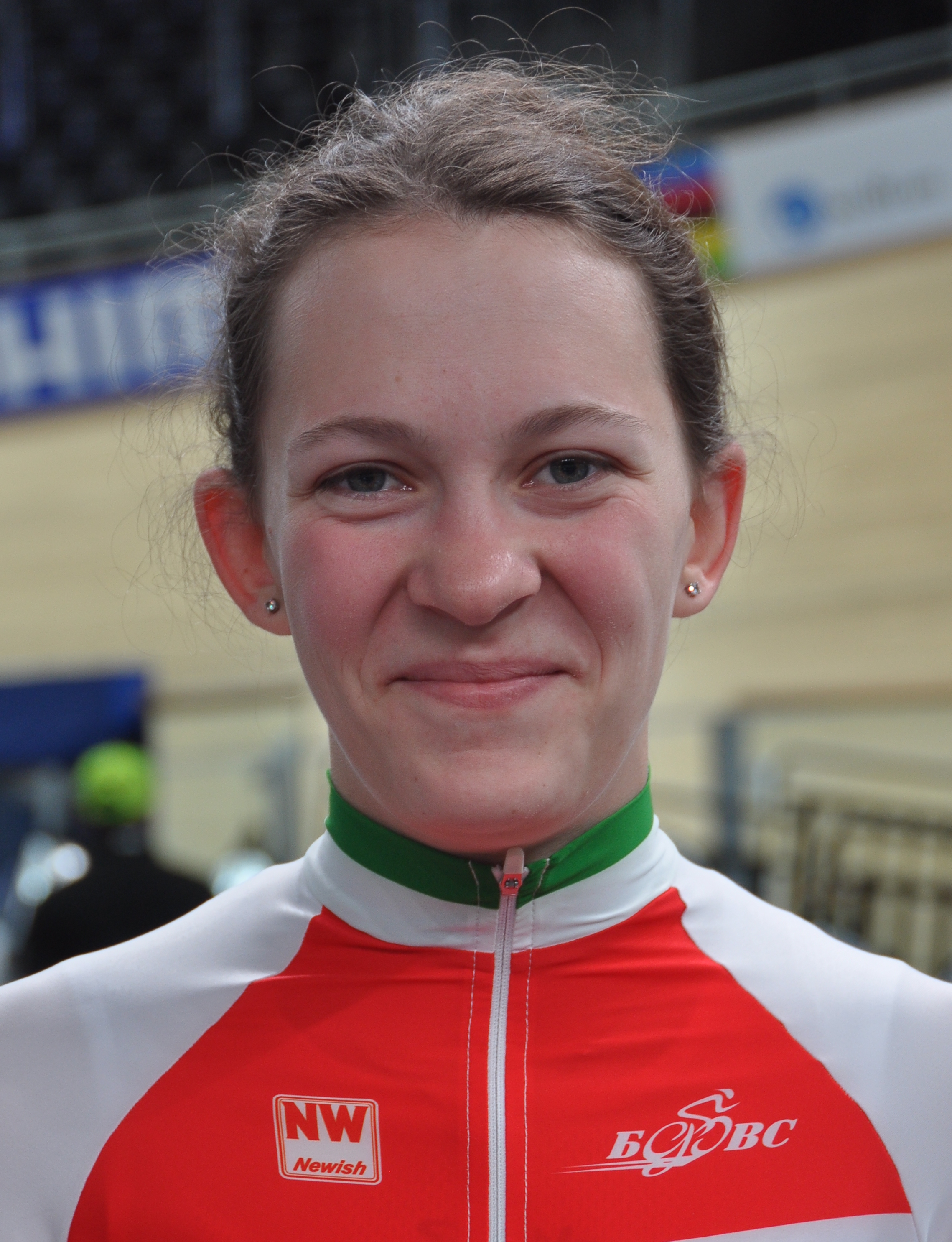
- Savenka in 2020

Personal information
- Full name: Karalina Biryuk
- Born: 21 April 1998 (age 28)

Cycling career
- Sport: Cycling
- Disciplines: Road; Track
- Role: Rider

Professional team
- 2018–2022: Minsk Cycling Club

Karalina Biryuk, née Savenka (born 21 April 1998) is a Belarusian professional racing cyclist, who rode for UCI Women's Continental Team Minsk Cycling Club.
