= Eimear Moran =

Irish rower and cyclist

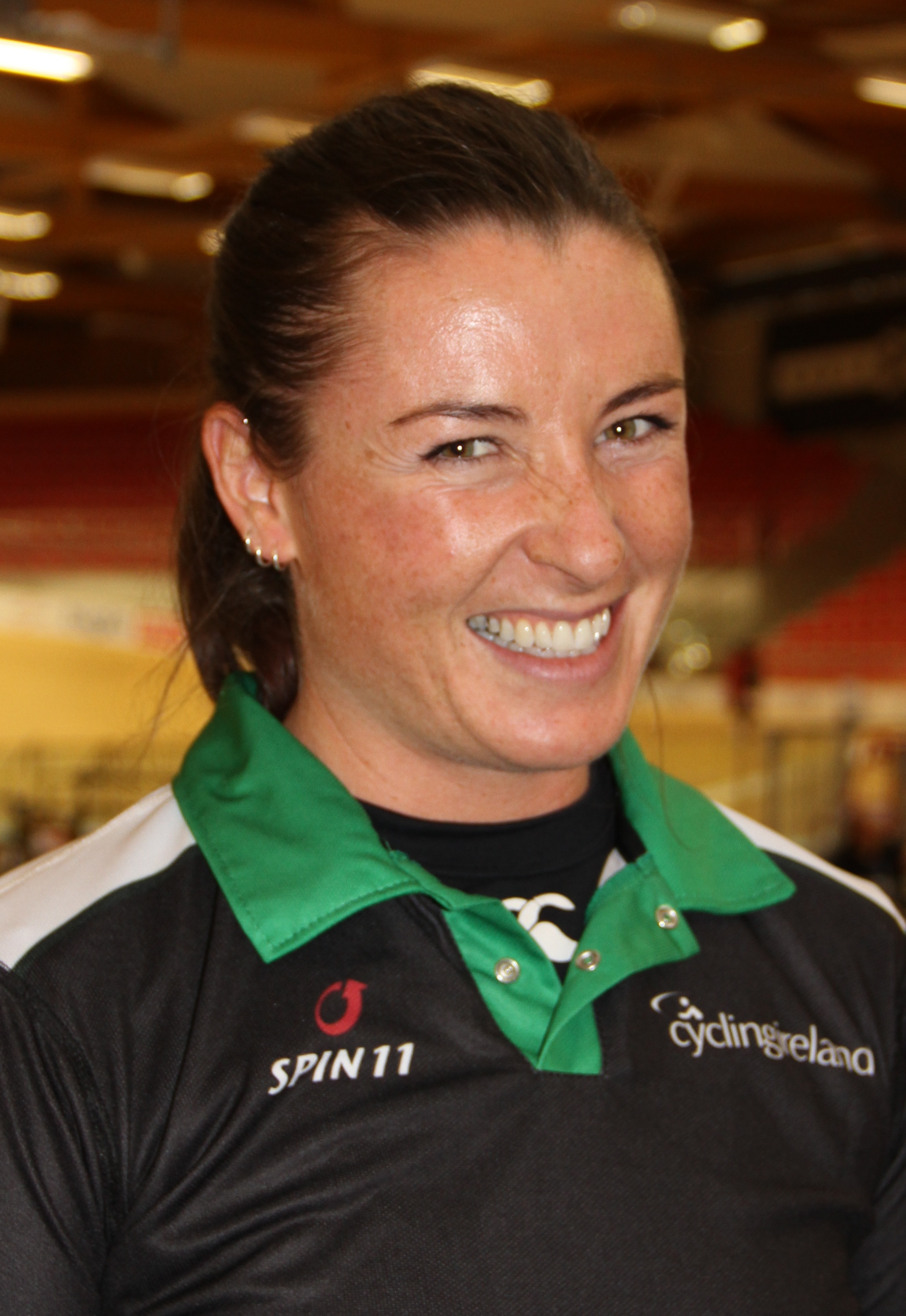
- Eimear Moran

Personal information
- Nationality: Irish
- Born: 21 February 1984 (age 42) Tullamore, Offaly

Sport
- Club: Offaly RC

Eimear Moran (born 21 February 1984) is an Irish competitive cyclist and rower who has represented Ireland at European and World events.

== Personal life ==
Born in Tullamore, Moran began rowing competitively when she was 14. Her first international race was the junior European championships where she won silver in the quad event. She attended university at the University of Sunderland.

== Rowing ==
In 2000, she won the junior doubles at the Irish national championships and represented The King's Hospital at Henley Women's Regatta where she also won. Competing for Ireland she won bronze and silver in the women's single scull at the Nations Cup in Copenhagen and the World Cup in rowing for U23s. In 2001, she again had victory in the junior single sculls at the Henley Women's Regatta. Moran then was the only Irish rower to be selected and represented Ireland in the World Junior Championships in Duisburg, Germany where she completed the competition ranked 11th.

2002 saw Moran retain her title at Henley Women's Regatta and the Irish national championships as well as again represent Ireland at the World Junior Championship. 2004 saw her winning Henley Women's Regatta as a member of a double sculls crew and attend the World University Championships at Brive in France. 2010 saw her return to competition after a break. She began training for national selection and represented Ireland at the European Championships and a World Cup regatta. However, by 2015 she had begun to compete in cycling rather than rowing.

== Cycling ==
Cycling for the Sundrive track team in 2015 Moran won four individual gold medals at the National Track Championships and two medals for team events at competitions earlier in the same year. Although these were track events Moran has also won several road races. Moran has now won several races with national record times.

== Career results ==
2016
1st Keirin, Dublin Track Cycling International
Athens Track Grand Prix

2nd Sprint
3rd 500m Time Trial
