= Lviv Cycling Team (women's team) =

Ukrainian cycling team

Team information
- UCI code: LCW (2019–)
- Founded: 2019
- Discipline: Road
- Status: UCI Women's Team (2019); UCI Women's Continental Team (2020–present)

Team name history
- 2019–: Lviv Cycling Team

Lviv Cycling Team is a professional cycling team which competes in elite road bicycle racing events such as the UCI Women's World Tour. The team was established in 2019, registering with the UCI for the 2019 season.

== Team roster ==
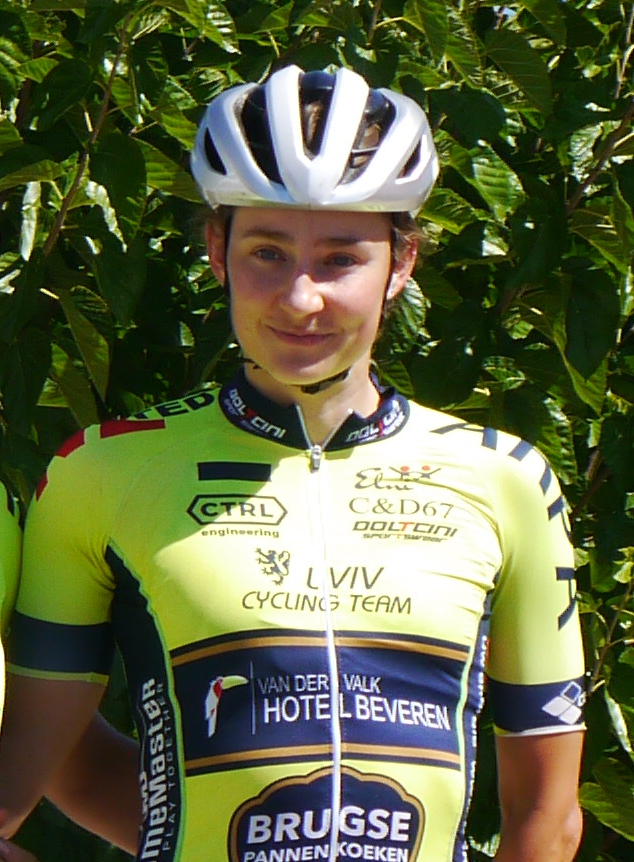
Alicia Evans in 2022.

As of 18 April 2021.

Rider	Date of birth
Viktoriia Alieksieieva (UKR)	25 October 1996 (age 29)
Viktoriya Bondar (UKR)	25 September 1995 (age 30)
Sarah Borremans (BEL)	4 August 1988 (age 38)
Lauren Creamer (IRL)	20 January 1992 (age 34)
Naomi de Roeck (BEL)	23 October 1990 (age 35)
Sophie Enever (GBR)	22 November 1999 (age 26)
Tetyana Klimchenko (UKR)	8 May 1994 (age 32)
Veronika Kormos (HUN)	17 August 1992 (age 34)
Marga López (ESP)	3 December 1997 (age 28)
Solomiia Lukachuk (UKR)	30 April 2001 (age 25)

Rider	Date of birth
Bronwyn MacGregor (NZL)	12 November 1982 (age 43)
Argiro Milaki (GRC)	3 July 1992 (age 34)
Anna Nahirna (UKR)	30 September 1988 (age 37)
Mirjana Schaap (NED)	25 April 1980 (age 46)
Olena Sharha (UKR)	24 December 1986 (age 39)
Sofiia Shevchenko (UKR)	29 June 2002 (age 24)
Hanna Solovey (UKR)	31 January 1992 (age 34)
Fiona Turnbull (GBR)	27 June 2000 (age 26)
Gloria Van Mechelen (BEL)	24 December 2002 (age 23)
Alice Zovico (ITA)	21 December 1999 (age 26)

== Major results ==
2019
Grand Prix Velo Alanya, Olena Sharha
VR Women ITT, Valeriya Kononenko

2022
Grand Prix Velo Alanya, Viktoriia Yaroshenko

== National Champions ==
2019
Ukraine Time Trial, Valeriya Kononenko
