= Grand Prix Velo Alanya (women's race) =

Race details
- Date: March
- Region: Turkey
- Discipline: Road
- Competition: UCI 1.2 (2019–)
- Type: One day race

History
- First edition: 2019
- Editions: 2 (as of 2020)
- First winner: Olena Sharga (UKR)
- Most wins: No repeat winners
- Most recent: Daria Malkova (RUS)

The Grand Prix Velo Alanya is an annual professional road bicycle race for women in Turkey.

== Winners ==
Year	Country	Rider	Team
2019	Ukraine	Olena Sharga	Lviv Cycling Team
2020	Russia	Daria Malkova	Cogeas-Mettler Pro Cycling Team
