= 2019 UEC European Track Championships – Women's sprint =

Women's sprint at the 2019 UEC European Track Championships
- Venue: Omnisport Apeldoorn, Apeldoorn
- Date: 17–18 October
- Competitors: 24 from 13 nations

Medalists
| gold medal | Anastasia Voynova | Russia |
| silver medal | Olena Starikova | Ukraine |
| bronze medal | Lea Friedrich | Germany |

The women's sprint competition at the 2019 UEC European Track Championships was held on 17 and 18 October 2019.

== Results ==
=== Qualifying ===
The top 8 riders qualified for the 1/8 finals, 9th to 24th places qualified for the 1/16 finals.

| Rank | Name | Nation | Time | Behind | Notes |
|---|---|---|---|---|---|
| 1 | Lea Friedrich | Germany | 10.724 | | Q |
| 2 | Emma Hinze | Germany | 10.738 | +0.014 | Q |
| 3 | Anastasia Voynova | Russia | 10.787 | +0.063 | Q |
| 4 | Olena Starikova | Ukraine | 10.789 | +0.065 | Q |
| 5 | Mathilde Gros | France | 10.838 | +0.114 | Q |
| 6 | Katy Marchant | Great Britain | 10.863 | +0.139 | Q |
| 7 | Shanne Braspennincx | Netherlands | 10.912 | +0.188 | Q |
| 8 | Daria Shmeleva | Russia | 10.914 | +0.190 | Q |
| 9 | Sophie Capewell | Great Britain | 10.991 | +0.267 | q |
| 10 | Urszula Łoś | Poland | 11.010 | +0.286 | q |
| 11 | Miriam Vece | Italy | 11.015 | +0.291 | q |
| 12 | Miglė Marozaitė | Lithuania | 11.055 | +0.331 | q |
| 13 | Laurine van Riessen | Netherlands | 11.125 | +0.401 | q |
| 14 | Simona Krupeckaitė | Lithuania | 11.148 | +0.424 | q |
| 15 | Nikola Sibiak | Poland | 11.189 | +0.465 | q |
| 16 | Nicky Degrendele | Belgium | 11.286 | +0.562 | q |
| 17 | Tania Calvo | Spain | 11.289 | +0.565 | q |
| 18 | Helena Casas | Spain | 11.299 | +0.575 | q |
| 19 | Sára Kaňkovská | Czech Republic | 11.357 | +0.633 | q |
| 20 | Lyubov Basova | Ukraine | 11.414 | +0.690 | q |
| 21 | Robyn Stewart | Ireland | 11.424 | +0.700 | q |
| 22 | Elena Bissolati | Italy | 11.457 | +0.733 | q |
| 23 | Veronika Jaborníková | Czech Republic | 11.657 | +0.933 | q |
| 24 | Eimear McMullan | Ireland | 11.707 | +0.983 | q |

=== 1/16 finals ===
Heat winners advanced to the 1/8 finals.

| Heat | Rank | Name | Nation | Time | Notes |
|---|---|---|---|---|---|
| 1 | 1 | Sophie Capewell | Great Britain | 11.790 | Q |
| 1 | 2 | Eimear McMullan | Ireland | | |
| 2 | 1 | Urszula Łoś | Poland | 11.558 | Q |
| 2 | 2 | Veronika Jaborníková | Czech Republic | | |
| 3 | 1 | Miriam Vece | Italy | 11.700 | Q |
| 3 | 2 | Elena Bissolati | Italy | | |
| 4 | 1 | Miglė Marozaitė | Lithuania | 11.875 | Q |
| 4 | 2 | Robyn Stewart | Ireland | | |
| 5 | 1 | Laurine van Riessen | Netherlands | 11.799 | Q |
| 5 | 2 | Lyubov Basova | Ukraine | | |
| 6 | 1 | Simona Krupeckaitė | Lithuania | 12.172 | Q |
| 6 | 2 | Sára Kaňkovská | Czech Republic | | |
| 7 | 1 | Nikola Sibiak | Poland | 12.007 | Q |
| 7 | 2 | Helena Casas | Spain | | |
| 8 | 1 | Tania Calvo | Spain | 11.725 | Q |
| 8 | 2 | Nicky Degrendele | Belgium | | |

=== 1/8 finals ===
Heat winners advanced to the quarterfinals.

| Heat | Rank | Name | Nation | Time | Notes |
|---|---|---|---|---|---|
| 1 | 1 | Lea Friedrich | Germany | 11.597 | Q |
| 1 | 2 | Tania Calvo | Spain | | |
| 2 | 1 | Emma Hinze | Germany | 11.532 | Q |
| 2 | 2 | Nikola Sibiak | Poland | | |
| 3 | 1 | Anastasia Voynova | Russia | 11.328 | Q |
| 3 | 2 | Simona Krupeckaitė | Lithuania | | |
| 4 | 1 | Olena Starikova | Ukraine | 11.175 | Q |
| 4 | 2 | Laurine van Riessen | Netherlands | | |
| 5 | 1 | Mathilde Gros | France | 11.473 | Q |
| 5 | 2 | Miglė Marozaitė | Lithuania | | |
| 6 | 1 | Katy Marchant | Great Britain | 11.581 | Q |
| 6 | 2 | Miriam Vece | Italy | | |
| 7 | 1 | Shanne Braspennincx | Netherlands | 11.327 | Q |
| 7 | 2 | Urszula Łoś | Poland | | |
| 8 | 1 | Daria Shmeleva | Russia | 11.507 | Q |
| 8 | 2 | Sophie Capewell | Great Britain | | |

=== Quarterfinals ===
Matches are extended to a best-of-three format hereon; winners proceed to the semifinals.

| Heat | Rank | Name | Nation | Race 1 | Race 2 | Decider (i.r.) | Notes |
|---|---|---|---|---|---|---|---|
| 1 | 1 | Lea Friedrich | Germany | 11.261 | 11.276 | | Q |
| 1 | 2 | Daria Shmeleva | Russia | | | | |
| 2 | 1 | Emma Hinze | Germany | 11.160 | 11.134 | | Q |
| 2 | 2 | Shanne Braspennincx | Netherlands | | | | |
| 3 | 1 | Anastasia Voynova | Russia | 11.096 | 11.274 | | Q |
| 3 | 2 | Katy Marchant | Great Britain | | | | |
| 4 | 1 | Olena Starikova | Ukraine | | 11.527 | 11.254 | Q |
| 4 | 2 | Mathilde Gros | France | 11.229 | | | |

=== Semifinals ===
Winners proceed to the gold medal final; losers proceed to the bronze medal final.

| Heat | Rank | Name | Nation | Race 1 | Race 2 | Decider (i.r.) | Notes |
|---|---|---|---|---|---|---|---|
| 1 | 1 | Olena Starikova | Ukraine | X | | X | QG |
| 1 | 2 | Lea Friedrich | Germany | | X | | QB |
| 2 | 1 | Anastasia Voynova | Russia | X | | X | QG |
| 2 | 2 | Emma Hinze | Germany | | X | | QB |

=== Finals ===
| Rank | Name | Nation | Race 1 | Race 2 | Decider (i.r.) |
|---|---|---|---|---|---|
Gold medal final
| 1st place, gold medalist(s) | Anastasia Voynova | Russia | 11.159 | 10.913 | |
| 2nd place, silver medalist(s) | Olena Starikova | Ukraine | | | |
Bronze medal final
| 3rd place, bronze medalist(s) | Lea Friedrich | Germany | 11.308 | 11.235 | |
| 4 | Emma Hinze | Germany | | | |
