= 2019 UEC European Track Championships – Women's keirin =

Women's keirin at the 2019 UEC European Track Championships
- Venue: Omnisport Apeldoorn, Apeldoorn
- Date: 19 October
- Competitors: 22 from 13 nations

Medalists
gold medal	Mathilde Gros	France
silver medal	Lea Friedrich	Germany
bronze medal	Daria Shmeleva	Russia

The women's keirin competition at the 2019 UEC European Track Championships was held on 19 October 2019.

== Results ==
=== First round ===
The first two riders in each heat qualified to the second round, all other riders advanced to the first round repechages.

Heat 1

Rank	Name	Nation	Notes
1	Shanne Braspennincx	Netherlands	Q
2	Daria Shmeleva	Russia	Q
3	Miglė Marozaitė	Lithuania	
4	Tania Calvo	Spain	
5	Veronika Jaborníková	Czech Republic	

Heat 2

Rank	Name	Nation	Notes
1	Lea Friedrich	Germany	Q
2	Mathilde Gros	France	Q
3	Lyubov Basova	Ukraine	
4	Urszula Łoś	Poland	
5	Sophie Capewell	Great Britain	
6	Eimear McMullan	Ireland	

Heat 3

Rank	Name	Nation	Notes
1	Nicky Degrendele	Belgium	Q
2	Sára Kaňkovská	Czech Republic	Q
3	Katy Marchant	Great Britain	
4	Elena Bissolati	Italy	
5	Helena Casas	Spain	

Heat 4

Rank	Name	Nation	Notes
1	Anastasia Voynova	Russia	Q
2	Robyn Stewart	Ireland	Q
3	Marlena Karwacka	Poland	
4	Miriam Vece	Italy	
5	Simona Krupeckaitė	Lithuania	
REL	Laurine van Riessen	Netherlands	

=== First round repechage ===
The first rider in each heat qualified to the second round.

Heat 1

Rank	Name	Nation	Notes
1	Miglė Marozaitė	Lithuania	Q
2	Miriam Vece	Italy	
3	Helena Casas	Spain	

Heat 2

Rank	Name	Nation	Notes
1	Sophie Capewell	Great Britain	Q
2	Lyubov Basova	Ukraine	
3	Elena Bissolati	Italy	

Heat 3

Rank	Name	Nation	Notes
1	Katy Marchant	Great Britain	Q
2	Laurine van Riessen	Netherlands	
3	Veronika Jaborníková	Czech Republic	
4	Urszula Łoś	Poland	

Heat 4

Rank	Name	Nation	Notes
1	Simona Krupeckaitė	Lithuania	Q
2	Tania Calvo	Spain	
3	Marlena Karwacka	Poland	
4	Eimear McMullan	Ireland	

=== Second round ===
The first three riders in each heat qualified to final 1–6, all other riders advanced to final 7–12.

Heat 1

Rank	Name	Nation	Notes
1	Anastasia Voynova	Russia	Q
2	Mathilde Gros	France	Q
3	Shanne Braspennincx	Netherlands	Q
4	Sára Kaňkovská	Czech Republic	
5	Miglė Marozaitė	Lithuania	
6	Simona Krupeckaitė	Lithuania	

Heat 2

Rank	Name	Nation	Notes
1	Nicky Degrendele	Belgium	Q
2	Daria Shmeleva	Russia	Q
3	Lea Friedrich	Germany	Q
4	Robyn Stewart	Ireland	
5	Sophie Capewell	Great Britain	
6	Katy Marchant	Great Britain	

=== Finals ===
Small final

Rank	Name	Nation	Notes
7	Simona Krupeckaitė	Lithuania	
8	Katy Marchant	Great Britain	
9	Miglė Marozaitė	Lithuania	
10	Robyn Stewart	Ireland	
11	Sophie Capewell	Great Britain	
12	Sára Kaňkovská	Czech Republic	

Final

Rank	Name	Nation	Notes
1st place, gold medalist(s)	Mathilde Gros	France	
2nd place, silver medalist(s)	Lea Friedrich	Germany	
3rd place, bronze medalist(s)	Daria Shmeleva	Russia	
4	Shanne Braspennincx	Netherlands	
5	Nicky Degrendele	Belgium	
6	Anastasia Voynova	Russia	
