= 2019 UEC European Track Championships – Women's team sprint =

Women's team sprint at the 2019 UEC European Track Championships
- Venue: Omnisport Apeldoorn, Apeldoorn
- Date: 16 October
- Competitors: 18 from 8 nations
- Winning time: 32.496

Medalists
gold medal	Anastasia Voynova; Daria Shmeleva; Ekaterina Rogovaya	Russia
silver medal	Lea Friedrich; Emma Hinze	Germany
bronze medal	Kyra Lamberink; Shanne Braspennincx; Steffie van der Peet	Netherlands

The women's team sprint competition at the 2019 UEC European Track Championships, in the Netherlands was held on 16 October 2019.

== Results ==
=== Qualifying ===
All teams advanced to the first round.

Rank	Name	Nation	Time	Behind	Notes
1	Lea Friedrich; Emma Hinze	Germany	33.273		Q
2	Kyra Lamberink; Steffie van der Peet	Netherlands	33.528	+0.255	Q
3	Simona Krupeckaitė; Miglė Marozaitė	Lithuania	33.549	+0.276	Q
4	Ekaterina Rogovaya; Daria Shmeleva	Russia	33.553	+0.280	Q
5	Marlena Karwacka; Urszula Łoś	Poland	33.622	+0.349	Q
6	Lyubov Basova; Olena Starikova	Ukraine	33.672	+0.399	Q
7	Tania Calvo; Helena Casas	Spain	34.104	+0.831	Q
8	Elena Bissolati; Miriam Vece	Italy	34.413	+1.140	Q

=== First round ===
First round heats were held as follows:
Heat 1: 4th v 5th fastest
Heat 2: 3rd v 6th fastest
Heat 3: 2nd v 7th fastest
Heat 4: 1st v 8th fastest

The heat winners were ranked on time, from which the top 2 proceeded to the gold medal final and the other 2 proceeded to the bronze medal final.

Rank	Overall rank	Name	Nation	Time	Behind	Notes
1 vs 8
1	2	Lea Friedrich; Emma Hinze	Germany	32.961		QG
2	7	Elena Bissolati; Miriam Vece	Italy	33.841	+0.880	
2 vs 7
1	3	Kyra Lamberink; Shanne Braspennincx	Netherlands	32.996		QB
2	6	Tania Calvo; Helena Casas	Spain	33.808	+0.812	
3 vs 6
1	4	Simona Krupeckaitė; Miglė Marozaitė	Lithuania	33.347		QB
2	8	Lyubov Basova; Olena Starikova	Ukraine	34.039	+0.692	
4 vs 5
1	1	Anastasia Voynova; Daria Shmeleva	Russia	32.724		QG
2	5	Marlena Karwacka; Urszula Łoś	Poland	33.601	+0.877	

=== Finals ===
Rank	Name	Nation	Time	Behind	Notes
Gold medal final
1st place, gold medalist(s)	Anastasia Voynova; Daria Shmeleva	Russia	32.496		
2nd place, silver medalist(s)	Lea Friedrich; Emma Hinze	Germany	33.179	+0.683	
Bronze medal final
3rd place, bronze medalist(s)	Kyra Lamberink; Shanne Braspennincx	Netherlands	33.023		
4	Simona Krupeckaitė; Miglė Marozaitė	Lithuania	33.370	+0.347	
