= 2020 UEC European Track Championships – Women's sprint =

Women's sprint at the 2020 UEC European Track Championships
- Venue: Kolodruma, Plovdiv
- Date: 12–13 November
- Competitors: 13 from 7 nations

Medalists
gold medal	Anastasia Voynova	Russia
silver medal	Daria Shmeleva	Russia
bronze medal	Olena Starikova	Ukraine

The women's sprint competition at the 2020 UEC European Track Championships was held on 12 and 13 November 2020.

== Results ==
=== Qualifying ===
The top 3 riders qualified for the 1/4 finals, the others proceed to the 1/8 finals.

Rank	Name	Nation	Time	Behind	Notes
1	Daria Shmeleva	Russia	10.612		Q
2	Olena Starikova	Ukraine	10.777	+0.165	Q
3	Anastasia Voynova	Russia	10.875	+0.263	Q
4	Miglė Marozaitė	Lithuania	10.955	+0.343	q
5	Miriam Vece	Italy	10.977	+0.365	q
6	Simona Krupeckaitė	Lithuania	10.983	+0.371	q
7	Sophie Capewell	Great Britain	11.009	+0.397	q
8	Katy Marchant	Great Britain	11.054	+0.442	q
9	Lyubov Basova	Ukraine	11.223	+0.611	q
10	Sára Kaňkovská	Czech Republic	11.249	+0.637	q
11	Helena Casas	Spain	11.314	+0.702	q
12	Elena Bissolati	Italy	11.381	+0.769	q
13	Veronika Jaborníková	Czech Republic	11.402	+0.790	q

=== 1/8 finals ===
Heat winners advanced to the quarterfinals.

Heat	Rank	Name	Nation	Time	Notes
1	1	Miglė Marozaitė	Lithuania	11.773	Q
1	2	Veronika Jaborníková	Czech Republic		
2	1	Miriam Vece	Italy	11.873	Q
2	2	Elena Bissolati	Italy		
3	1	Simona Krupeckaitė	Lithuania	11.856	Q
3	2	Helena Casas	Spain		
4	1	Sophie Capewell	Great Britain	11.724	Q
4	2	Sára Kaňkovská	Czech Republic		
5	1	Katy Marchant	Great Britain	11.494	Q
5	2	Lyubov Basova	Ukraine		

=== Quarterfinals ===
Matches are extended to a best-of-three format hereon; winners proceed to the semifinals.

Heat	Rank	Name	Nation	Race 1	Race 2	Decider (i.r.)	Notes
1	1	Daria Shmeleva	Russia	11.373	11.717		Q
1	2	Katy Marchant	Great Britain				
2	1	Olena Starikova	Ukraine	11.389	11.430		Q
2	2	Sophie Capewell	Great Britain				
3	1	Anastasia Voynova	Russia	11.121	11.454		Q
3	2	Simona Krupeckaitė	Lithuania				
4	1	Miglė Marozaitė	Lithuania		11.443	11.407	Q
4	2	Miriam Vece	Italy	11.322			

=== Semifinals ===
Winners proceed to the gold medal final; losers proceed to the bronze medal final.

Heat	Rank	Name	Nation	Race 1	Race 2	Decider (i.r.)	Notes
1	1	Daria Shmeleva	Russia	11.664	11.683		QG
1	2	Miglė Marozaitė	Lithuania				QB
2	1	Anastasia Voynova	Russia	11.330	11.252		QG
2	2	Olena Starikova	Ukraine				QB

=== Finals ===
Rank	Name	Nation	Race 1	Race 2	Decider (i.r.)
Gold medal final
1st place, gold medalist(s)	Anastasia Voynova	Russia		10.986	11.157
2nd place, silver medalist(s)	Daria Shmeleva	Russia	11.388		
Bronze medal final
3rd place, bronze medalist(s)	Olena Starikova	Ukraine	11.291	11.462	
4	Miglė Marozaitė	Lithuania			
