= Cycling at the 2019 European Games – Women's sprint =

Women's sprint at the 2019 European Games
- Venue: Minsk Velodrome
- Date: 29–30 June
- Competitors: 22 from 13 nations

Medalists
gold medal	Anastasia Voynova	Russia
silver medal	Mathilde Gros	France
bronze medal	Daria Shmeleva	Russia

The women's cycling sprint at the 2019 European Games was held at the Minsk Velodrome on 29 and 30 June 2019.

== Results ==
=== Qualifying ===
The top two riders advanced directly to the 1/16 finals; others advanced to the 1/32 finals.

Rank	Name	Nation	Time	Behind	Notes
1	Mathilde Gros	France	10.765		Q
2	Shanne Braspennincx	Netherlands	10.782	+0.017	Q
3	Anastasia Voynova	Russia	10.816	+0.051	q
4	Daria Shmeleva	Russia	10.851	+0.086	q
5	Olena Starikova	Ukraine	10.928	+0.163	q
6	Laurine van Riessen	Netherlands	10.955	+0.190	q
7	Miglė Marozaitė	Lithuania	11.022	+0.257	q
8	Simona Krupeckaitė	Lithuania	11.050	+0.285	q
9	Katy Marchant	Great Britain	11.078	+0.313	q
10	Miriam Vece	Italy	11.125	+0.360	q
11	Tania Calvo	Spain	11.221	+0.456	q
12	Sophie Capewell	Great Britain	11.221	+0.456	q
13	Nicky Degrendele	Belgium	11.227	+0.462	q
14	Sára Kaňkovská	Czech Republic	11.229	+0.464	q
15	Sandie Clair	France	11.293	+0.528	q
16	Nikola Sibiak	Poland	11.310	+0.545	q
17	Lyubov Basova	Ukraine	11.338	+0.573	q
18	Robyn Stewart	Ireland	11.425	+0.660	q
19	Aleksandra Tołomanow	Poland	11.437	+0.672	q
20	Martina Fidanza	Italy	11.615	+0.850	q
21	Dziyana Miadzvetskaya	Belarus	11.632	+0.867	q
22	Helena Casas	Spain	11.679	+0.914	q

=== 1/32 finals ===
Heat winners advanced to the 1/16 finals; others advanced to the 1/32 finals repechage.

Heat	Rank	Name	Nation	Gap	Notes
3	1	Anastasia Voynova	Russia		Q
3	2	Helena Casas	Spain	+0.614	
4	1	Daria Shmeleva	Russia		Q
4	2	Dziyana Miadzvetskaya	Belarus	+0.106	
5	1	Olena Starikova	Ukraine		Q
5	2	Martina Fidanza	Italy	+0.220	
6	1	Laurine van Riessen	Netherlands		
6	2	Aleksandra Tołomanow	Poland	+0.192	
7	1	Miglė Marozaitė	Lithuania		Q
7	2	Robyn Stewart	Ireland	+0.115	
8	1	Simona Krupeckaitė	Lithuania		Q
8	2	Lyubov Basova	Ukraine	+0.085	
9	1	Katy Marchant	Great Britain		Q
9	2	Nikola Sibiak	Poland	+0.028	
10	1	Sandie Clair	France		Q
10	2	Miriam Vece	Italy	+0.015	
11	1	Tania Calvo	Spain		Q
11	2	Sára Kaňkovská	Czech Republic	+0.061	
12	1	Nicky Degrendele	Belgium		Q
12	2	Sophie Capewell	Great Britain	+0.175	

=== 1/32 finals repechage ===
Heat winners advanced to the 1/16 finals.

Heat	Rank	Name	Nation	Gap	Notes
1	1	Nikola Sibiak	Poland		Q
1	2	Lyubov Basova	Ukraine	+0.054	
2	1	Miriam Vece	Italy		Q
2	2	Robyn Stewart	Ireland	+0.319	
3	1	Sára Kaňkovská	Czech Republic		Q
3	2	Aleksandra Tołomanow	Poland	+0.093	
3	3	Helena Casas	Spain	+0.167	
4	1	Sophie Capewell	Great Britain		Q
4	2	Martina Fidanza	Italy	+0.067	
4	3	Dziyana Miadzvetskaya	Belarus	+0.187	

=== 1/16 finals ===
Heat winners advanced to the 1/8 finals; others advanced to the 1/16 finals repechage.

Heat	Rank	Name	Nation	Gap	Notes
1	1	Mathilde Gros	France		Q
1	2	Sophie Capewell	Great Britain	+0.203	
2	1	Shanne Braspennincx	Netherlands		Q
2	2	Sára Kaňkovská	Czech Republic	+0.012	
3	1	Anastasia Voynova	Russia		Q
3	2	Miriam Vece	Italy	+0.401	
4	1	Daria Shmeleva	Russia		Q
4	2	Nikola Sibiak	Poland	+0.035	
5	1	Olena Starikova	Ukraine		Q
5	2	Nicky Degrendele	Belgium	+0.035	
6	1	Laurine van Riessen	Netherlands		Q
6	2	Tania Calvo	Spain	+0.062	
7	1	Miglė Marozaitė	Lithuania		Q
7	2	Sandie Clair	France	+0.004	
8	1	Simona Krupeckaitė	Lithuania		Q
8	2	Katy Marchant	Great Britain	+0.051	

=== 1/16 finals repechage ===
Heat winners advanced to the 1/8 finals.

Heat	Rank	Name	Nation	Gap	Notes
1	1	Katy Marchant	Great Britain		Q
1	2	Sophie Capewell	Great Britain	+0.001	
2	1	Sandie Clair	France		Q
2	2	Sára Kaňkovská	Czech Republic	+0.110	
3	1	Tania Calvo	Spain		Q
3	2	Miriam Vece	Italy	+0.069	
4	1	Nicky Degrendele	Belgium		Q
4	2	Nikola Sibiak	Poland	+0.051	

=== 1/8 finals ===
Heat winners advanced to the quarterfinals; others advanced to the 1/8 finals repechage.

Heat	Rank	Name	Nation	Gap	Notes
1	1	Mathilde Gros	France		Q
1	2	Nicky Degrendele	Belgium	+0.232	
2	1	Shanne Braspennincx	Netherlands		Q
2	2	Tania Calvo	Spain	+0.111	
3	1	Anastasia Voynova	Russia		Q
3	2	Sandie Clair	France	+0.167	
4	1	Daria Shmeleva	Russia		Q
4	2	Katy Marchant	Great Britain	+0.148	
5	1	Simona Krupeckaitė	Lithuania		Q
5	2	Olena Starikova	Ukraine	+0.127	
6	1	Laurine van Riessen	Netherlands		Q
6	2	Miglė Marozaitė	Lithuania	+0.168	

=== 1/8 finals repechage ===
Heat winners advanced to the quarterfinals.

Heat	Rank	Name	Nation	Gap	Notes
1	1	Olena Starikova	Ukraine		Q
1	2	Katy Marchant	Great Britain	+0.005	
1	3	Nicky Degrendele	Belgium	+0.094	
2	1	Sandie Clair	France		Q
2	2	Miglė Marozaitė	Lithuania	+0.085	
2	3	Tania Calvo	Spain	+0.085	

=== Quarterfinals ===
Matches are extended to a best-of-three format hereon; winners proceed to the semifinals.

Heat	Rank	Name	Nation	Race 1	Race 2	Decider (i.r.)	Notes
1	1	Mathilde Gros	France	X	X		Q
1	2	Sandie Clair	France	+0.256	+0.132		
2	1	Shanne Braspennincx	Netherlands	+0.018	X	X	Q
2	2	Olena Starikova	Ukraine	X	+0.033	+2.292	
3	1	Anastasia Voynova	Russia	X	X		Q
3	2	Laurine van Riessen	Netherlands	+0.341	+0.129		
4	1	Daria Shmeleva	Russia	X	X		Q
4	2	Simona Krupeckaitė	Lithuania	+0.010	+0.026		

=== Semifinals ===
Winners proceed to the gold medal final; losers proceed to the bronze medal final.

Heat	Rank	Name	Nation	Race 1	Race 2	Decider (i.r.)	Notes
1	1	Mathilde Gros	France	X	+0.007	X	QG
1	2	Daria Shmeleva	Russia	+0.777	X	+0.026	QB
2	1	Anastasia Voynova	Russia	X	X		QG
2	2	Shanne Braspennincx	Netherlands		+0.143		QB

=== Finals ===
Rank	Name	Nation	Race 1	Race 2	Decider (i.r.)
Gold medal final
1st place, gold medalist(s)	Anastasia Voynova	Russia	X	X	
2nd place, silver medalist(s)	Mathilde Gros	France	+0.810	+0.056	
Bronze medal final
3rd place, bronze medalist(s)	Daria Shmeleva	Russia	+0.022	X	X
4	Shanne Braspennincx	Netherlands	X	+0.048	+0.084
