= 2020 UCI Track Cycling World Championships – Women's 500 m time trial =

Women's 500 m time trial at the 2020 UCI Track Cycling World Championships
- Venue: Velodrom
- Location: Berlin, Germany
- Dates: 29 February
- Competitors: 21 from 14 nations
- Winning time: 33.121

Medalists
gold medal	Lea Friedrich	Germany
silver medal	Jessica Salazar	Mexico
bronze medal	Miriam Vece	Italy

The women's 500 m time trial competition at the 2020 UCI Track Cycling World Championships was held on 29 February 2020.

== Results ==
=== Qualifying ===
The qualifying was started at 11:00. The top 8 riders qualified for the final.

Rank	Name	Nation	Time	Behind	Notes
1	Lea Friedrich	Germany	33.197		Q
2	Pauline Grabosch	Germany	33.262	+0.065	Q
3	Jessica Salazar	Mexico	33.299	+0.102	Q
4	Miriam Vece	Italy	33.410	+0.213	Q
5	Daria Shmeleva	Russia	33.470	+0.273	Q
6	Kyra Lamberink	Netherlands	33.521	+0.324	Q
7	Anastasia Voynova	Russia	33.550	+0.353	Q
8	Urszula Łoś	Poland	33.655	+0.458	Q
9	Olena Starikova	Ukraine	33.778	+0.581	
10	Daniela Gaxiola	Mexico	33.870	+0.673	
11	Ekaterina Rogovaya	Russia	33.988	+0.791	
12	Steffie van der Peet	Netherlands	34.064	+0.867	
13	Natalia Antonova	Russia	34.074	+0.877	
14	Kaarle McCulloch	Australia	34.139	+0.942	
15	Helena Casas	Spain	34.586	+1.389	
16	Lin Junhong	China	34.711	+1.514	
17	Juliana Gaviria	Colombia	34.828	+1.631	
18	Zhang Linyin	China	34.856	+1.659	
19	Sarah Orban	Canada	35.092	+1.895	
20	Charlene Du Preez	South Africa	35.183	+1.986	
21	Kim Soo-hyun	South Korea	35.284	+2.087	

=== Final ===
The final was started at 16:30.

Rank	Name	Nation	Time	Behind	Notes
1st place, gold medalist(s)	Lea Friedrich	Germany	33.121		
2nd place, silver medalist(s)	Jessica Salazar	Mexico	33.154	+0.033	
3rd place, bronze medalist(s)	Miriam Vece	Italy	33.171	+0.050	
4	Pauline Grabosch	Germany	33.179	+0.058	
5	Anastasia Voynova	Russia	33.476	+0.355	
6	Daria Shmeleva	Russia	33.494	+0.373	
7	Urszula Łoś	Poland	33.923	+0.802	
8	Kyra Lamberink	Netherlands	34.004	+0.883	
