= 2016 UEC European Track Championships – Women's sprint =

Women's sprint at the 2016 UEC European Track Championships
- UEC European Champion jersey
- Venue: Vélodrome de Saint-Quentin-en-Yvelines, Yvelines
- Date: 22-23 October
- Competitors: 16 from 10 nations

Medalists
gold medal	Simona Krupeckaitė	Lithuania
silver medal	Anastasiia Voinova	Russia
bronze medal	Tania Calvo	Spain

The Women's sprint was held on 22 and 23 October 2016.

== Results ==
=== Qualifying ===
The top 12 qualify for the match rounds.

Rank	Name	Nation	Time	Notes
1	Anastasiia Voinova	Russia	10.951	Q
2	Tania Calvo	Spain	10.967	Q
3	Simona Krupeckaitė	Lithuania	11.018	Q
4	Pauline Grabosch	Germany	11.030	Q
5	Miglė Marozaitė	Lithuania	11.042	Q
6	Tatiana Kiseleva	Russia	11.150	Q
7	Rachel James	Great Britain	11.175	Q
8	Nicky Degrendele	Belgium	11.257	Q
9	Kyra Lamberink	Netherlands	11.281	Q
10	Helena Casas	Spain	11.297	Q
11	Hetty van de Wouw	Netherlands	11.301	Q
12	Olena Starikova	Ukraine	11.378	Q
13	Robyn Stewart	Ireland	11.590	
14	Eleanor Richardson	Great Britain	11.697	
15	Marie Dufour	France	11.949	
—	Liubov Basova	Ukraine	DNS	

=== 1/8 Finals ===
Winners proceed directly to the quarter-finals; losers proceed to the repechage.

Heat	Rank	Name	Nation	Time	Notes
1	1	Anastasiia Voinova	Russia	11.538	Q
1	2	Olena Starikova	Ukraine		
2	1	Tania Calvo	Spain	12.023	Q
2	2	Hetty van de Wouw	Netherlands		
3	1	Simona Krupeckaitė	Lithuania	11.799	Q
3	2	Helena Casas	Spain		
4	1	Pauline Grabosch	Germany	11.721	Q
4	2	Kyra Lamberink	Netherlands		
5	1	Nicky Degrendele	Belgium	11.615	Q
5	2	Miglė Marozaitė	Lithuania		
6	1	Tatiana Kiseleva	Russia	11.979	Q
6	2	Rachel James	Great Britain		

=== 1/8 Finals Repechage ===
Winners proceed to the quarter-finals; losers proceed to the race for places 9-12.

Heat	Rank	Name	Nation	Time	Notes
1	1	Kyra Lamberink	Netherlands	11.905	Q
1	2	Rachel James	Great Britain		
1	3	Olena Starikova	Ukraine		
2	1	Helena Casas	Spain	12.862	Q
2	2	Miglė Marozaitė	Lithuania		
2	3	Hetty van de Wouw	Netherlands		

=== Race for 9th place ===
This ranking final determines the allocation of places 9-12.

Rank	Name	Nation	Time
9	Rachel James	Great Britain	11.842
10	Miglė Marozaitė	Lithuania	
11	Olena Starikova	Ukraine	
12	Hetty van de Wouw	Netherlands	

=== Quarter-finals ===
One-on-one matches are extended to a 'best of three' format hereon. Winners proceed to the semi-finals; losers proceed to the race for places 5-8.

Heat	Rank	Name	Nation	Race 1	Race 2	Decider	Notes
1	1	Anastasiia Voinova	Russia	11.617	11.709		Q
1	2	Helena Casas	Spain				
2	1	Tania Calvo	Spain	11.655	11.885		Q
2	2	Kyra Lamberink	Netherlands				
3	1	Simona Krupeckaitė	Lithuania	11.704	11.683		Q
3	2	Tatiana Kiseleva	Russia				
4	1	Nicky Degrendele	Belgium	11.374	11.517		Q
4	2	Pauline Grabosch	Germany				

=== Race for 5th place ===
This ranking final determines the allocation of places 5-8.

Rank	Name	Nation	Time
5	Pauline Grabosch	Germany	11.494
6	Helena Casas	Spain	
7	Tatiana Kiseleva	Russia	
8	Kyra Lamberink	Netherlands	

=== Semi-finals ===
Winners proceed to the gold medal final; losers proceed to the bronze medal final.

Heat	Rank	Name	Nation	Race 1	Race 2	Decider	Notes
1	1	Anastasiia Voinova	Russia	11.660	11.717		Q
1	2	Nicky Degrendele	Belgium				
2	1	Simona Krupeckaitė	Lithuania	11.520	11.672		Q
2	2	Tania Calvo	Spain				

=== Finals ===
The final classification is determined in the medal finals.

Rank	Name	Nation	Race 1	Race 2	Decider
Bronze medal final
3rd place, bronze medalist(s)	Tania Calvo	Spain	11.497	11.219	
4	Nicky Degrendele	Belgium			
Gold medal final
1st place, gold medalist(s)	Simona Krupeckaitė	Lithuania	11.557	11.595	
2nd place, silver medalist(s)	Anastasiia Voinova	Russia			
