= 2020 UEC European Track Championships – Women's keirin =

Women's keirin at the 2020 UEC European Track Championships
- Venue: Kolodruma, Plovdiv
- Date: 14 November
- Competitors: 12 from 7 nations

Medalists
gold medal	Olena Starikova	Ukraine
silver medal	Sára Kaňkovská	Czech Republic
bronze medal	Helena Casas	Spain

The women's keirin competition at the 2020 UEC European Track Championships was held on 14 November 2020.

== Results ==
=== First round ===
The first three riders in each heat qualified to final 1–6, all other riders advanced to final 7–12.

Heat 1

Rank	Name	Nation	Notes
1	Olena Starikova	Ukraine	Q
2	Elena Bissolati	Italy	Q
3	Sára Kaňkovská	Czech Republic	Q
4	Katy Marchant	Great Britain	
5	Anastasia Voynova	Russia	
6	Miglė Marozaitė	Lithuania	

Heat 2

Rank	Name	Nation	Notes
1	Simona Krupeckaitė	Lithuania	Q
2	Helena Casas	Spain	Q
3	Sophie Capewell	Great Britain	Q
4	Daria Shmeleva	Russia	
5	Veronika Jaborníková	Czech Republic	
6	Lyubov Basova	Ukraine	

=== Finals ===
Small final

Rank	Name	Nation	Notes
7	Anastasia Voynova	Russia	
8	Veronika Jaborníková	Czech Republic	
9	Miglė Marozaitė	Lithuania	
10	Lyubov Basova	Ukraine	
11	Daria Shmeleva	Russia	
REL	Katy Marchant	Great Britain	

Final

Rank	Name	Nation	Notes
1st place, gold medalist(s)	Olena Starikova	Ukraine	
2nd place, silver medalist(s)	Sára Kaňkovská	Czech Republic	
3rd place, bronze medalist(s)	Helena Casas	Spain	
4	Sophie Capewell	Great Britain	
5	Simona Krupeckaitė	Lithuania	
6	Elena Bissolati	Italy	
