= 2018 UEC European Track Championships – Women's team sprint =

Women's team sprint at the 2018 UEC European Track Championships
- Venue: Sir Chris Hoy Velodrome, Glasgow
- Date: 3 August
- Competitors: 22 from 10 nations
- Winning time: 32.452

Medalists
gold medal	Anastasia Voynova; Daria Shmeleva	Russia
silver medal	Lyubov Basova; Olena Starikova	Ukraine
bronze medal	Miriam Welte; Emma Hinze	Germany

The women's team sprint competition at the 2018 UEC European Track Championships was held on 3 August 2018.

== Results ==
=== Qualifying ===
The eight fastest teams advanced to the first round.

Rank	Name	Nation	Time	Behind	Notes
1	Daria Shmeleva; Anastasia Voynova	Russia	32.593		Q
2	Emma Hinze; Miriam Welte	Germany	33.024	+0.431	Q
3	Lyubov Basova; Olena Starikova	Ukraine	33.109	+0.516	Q
4	Shanne Braspennincx; Laurine van Riessen	Netherlands	33.336	+0.743	Q
5	Sandie Clair; Mathilde Gros	France	33.486	+0.893	Q
6	Simona Krupeckaitė; Miglė Marozaitė	Lithuania	33.761	+1.168	Q
7	Marlena Karwacka; Urszula Łoś	Poland	33.826	+1.233	Q
8	Tania Calvo; Helena Casas	Spain	33.827	+1.234	Q
9	Lauren Bate-Lowe; Katy Marchant	Great Britain	33.884	+1.291	
10	Elena Bissolati; Miriam Vece	Italy	34.653	+2.060	

=== First round ===
First round heats were held as follows:
Heat 1: 4th v 5th fastest
Heat 2: 3rd v 6th fastest
Heat 3: 2nd v 7th fastest
Heat 4: 1st v 8th fastest

The heat winners were ranked on time, from which the top 2 proceeded to the gold medal final and the other 2 proceeded to the bronze medal final.

Rank	Overall rank	Name	Nation	Time	Behind	Notes
1 vs 8
1	1	Daria Shmeleva; Anastasia Voynova	Russia	32.417		QG
2	7	Tania Calvo; Helena Casas	Spain	33.703	+1.286	
2 vs 7
1	3	Emma Hinze; Miriam Welte	Germany	33.012		QB
2	8	Julita Jagodzińska; Urszula Łoś	Poland	33.998	+0.986	
3 vs 6
1	2	Lyubov Basova; Olena Starikova	Ukraine	32.868		QG
2	6	Simona Krupeckaitė; Miglė Marozaitė	Lithuania	33.569	+0.701	
4 vs 5
1	4	Shanne Braspennincx; Kyra Lamberink	Netherlands	33.121		QB
2	5	Sandie Clair; Mathilde Gros	France	33.160	+0.039	

- QG = qualified for gold medal final
- QB = qualified for bronze medal final

=== Finals ===
Rank	Name	Nation	Time	Behind	Notes
Gold medal final
1st place, gold medalist(s)	Anastasia Voynova; Daria Shmeleva	Russia	32.452		
2nd place, silver medalist(s)	Lyubov Basova; Olena Starikova	Ukraine	33.108	+0.656	
Bronze medal final
3rd place, bronze medalist(s)	Miriam Welte; Emma Hinze	Germany	32.981		
4	Kyra Lamberink; Shanne Braspennincx	Netherlands	33.481	+0.500	
