= 2015 UEC European Track Championships – Women's 500 m time trial =

Women's 500m time trial at the 2015 UEC European Track Championships
- UEC European Champion jersey
- Venue: Velodrome Suisse, Grenchen
- Date: 17 October
- Competitors: 10 from 7 nations

Medalists
gold medal	Anastasiia Voinova	Russia
silver medal	Elis Ligtlee	Netherlands
bronze medal	Daria Shmeleva	Russia

The Women's 500 m time trial was held on 17 October 2015.

== Results ==
Rank	Name	Nation	Time	Notes
1st place, gold medalist(s)	Anastasiia Voinova	Russia	32.794	WR
2nd place, silver medalist(s)	Elis Ligtlee	Netherlands	33.561	
3rd place, bronze medalist(s)	Daria Shmeleva	Russia	33.842	
4	Katy Marchant	Great Britain	33.897	
5	Tania Calvo	Spain	33.909	
6	Laurine van Riessen	Netherlands	34.125	
7	Victoria Williamson	Great Britain	34.260	
8	Miglė Marozaitė	Lithuania	34.917	
9	Olena Starikova	Ukraine	35.364	
10	Eimear Moran	Ireland	37.226	
