= 2020 UEC European Track Championships – Women's 500 m time trial =

Women's 500 m time trial at the 2020 UEC European Track Championships
- Venue: Kolodruma, Plovdiv
- Date: 15 November
- Competitors: 8 from 5 nations
- Winning time: 32.720

Medalists
| gold medal | Daria Shmeleva | Russia |
| silver medal | Anastasia Voynova | Russia |
| bronze medal | Miriam Vece | Italy |

The women's 500 m time trial competition at the 2020 UEC European Track Championships was held on 15 November 2020.

== Results ==
| Rank | Name | Nation | Time | Behind | Notes |
|---|---|---|---|---|---|
| 1st place, gold medalist(s) | Daria Shmeleva | Russia | 32.720 | | |
| 2nd place, silver medalist(s) | Anastasia Voynova | Russia | 33.719 | +0.999 | |
| 3rd place, bronze medalist(s) | Miriam Vece | Italy | 33.769 | +1.049 | |
| 4 | Olena Starikova | Ukraine | 34.019 | +1.299 | |
| 5 | Helena Casas | Spain | 34.826 | +2.106 | |
| 6 | Sára Kaňkovská | Czech Republic | 34.967 | +2.247 | |
| 7 | Veronika Jaborníková | Czech Republic | 35.772 | +3.052 | |
| 8 | Oleksandra Lohviniuk | Ukraine | 36.160 | +3.440 | |
