= 2019 UCI Track Cycling World Championships – Women's 500 m time trial =

Women's 500 m time trial at the 2019 UCI Track Cycling World Championships
- Venue: BGŻ Arena
- Location: Pruszków, Poland
- Dates: 2 March
- Competitors: 26 from 17 nations
- Winning time: 33.012

Medalists
gold medal	Daria Shmeleva	Russia
silver medal	Olena Starikova	Ukraine
bronze medal	Kaarle McCulloch	Australia

The Women's 500 m time trial competition at the 2019 UCI Track Cycling World Championships was held on 2 March 2019.

== Results ==
=== Qualifying ===
The qualifying was started at 12:00. The top 8 riders qualified for the final.

Rank	Name	Nation	Time	Behind	Notes
1	Daria Shmeleva	Russia	33.554		Q
2	Kaarle McCulloch	Australia	33.556	+0.002	Q
3	Miriam Welte	Germany	33.598	+0.044	Q
4	Olena Starikova	Ukraine	33.674	+0.120	Q
5	Kyra Lamberink	Netherlands	33.798	+0.244	Q
6	Jessica Salazar	Mexico	33.973	+0.419	Q
7	Lea Friedrich	Germany	34.102	+0.548	Q
8	Miriam Vece	Italy	34.127	+0.573	Q
9	Lin Junhong	China	34.144	+0.590	
10	Urszula Łoś	Poland	34.260	+0.706	
11	Yuli Verdugo	Mexico	34.280	+0.726	
12	Natalia Antonova	Russia	34.296	+0.752	
13	Tania Calvo	Spain	34.333	+0.779	
14	Katy Marchant	Great Britain	34.335	+0.781	
15	Pauline Grabosch	Germany	34.352	+0.798	
16	Helena Casas	Spain	34.415	+0.861	
17	Hetty van de Wouw	Netherlands	34.518	+0.964	
18	Guo Yufang	China	34.580	+1.026	
19	Martha Bayona	Colombia	34.756	+1.202	
20	Ekaterina Rogovaya	Russia	34.765	+1.211	
21	Mandy Marquardt	United States	35.049	+1.495	
22	Victoria Williamson	Great Britain	35.069	+1.515	
23	Crismonita Dwi Putri	Indonesia	35.182	+1.628	
24	Ellesse Andrews	New Zealand	35.439	+1.885	
25	Charlene Du Preez	South Africa	36.235	+2.681	
26	Li Yin Yin	Hong Kong	36.505	+2.951	

=== Final ===
The final was started at 17:00.

Rank	Name	Nation	Time	Behind	Notes
1st place, gold medalist(s)	Daria Shmeleva	Russia	33.012		
2nd place, silver medalist(s)	Olena Starikova	Ukraine	33.307	+0.295	
3rd place, bronze medalist(s)	Kaarle McCulloch	Australia	33.419	+0.407	
4	Miriam Welte	Germany	33.431	+0.419	
5	Jessica Salazar	Mexico	33.826	+0.814	
6	Kyra Lamberink	Netherlands	33.972	+0.960	
7	Lea Friedrich	Germany	33.997	+0.985	
8	Miriam Vece	Italy	34.247	+1.235	
