= 2017 UEC European Track Championships – Women's 500 m time trial =

Women's 500 m time trial at the 2017 UEC European Track Championships
- UEC European Champion jersey
- Venue: Velodrom, Berlin
- Date: 20 October
- Competitors: 13 from 8 nations
- Winning time: 33.321

Medalists
gold medal	Miriam Welte	Germany
silver medal	Pauline Grabosch	Germany
bronze medal	Daria Shmeleva	Russia

The Women's 500 m time trial was held on 20 October 2017.

== Results ==
=== Qualifying ===
The top 8 riders qualified for the final.

Rank	Name	Nation	Time	Notes
1	Daria Shmeleva	Russia	33.576	Q
2	Pauline Grabosch	Germany	33.579	Q
3	Miriam Welte	Germany	33.593	Q
4	Olena Starikova	Ukraine	33.760	Q
5	Tania Calvo	Spain	34.302	Q
6	Kyra Lamberink	Netherlands	34.459	Q
7	Katy Marchant	Great Britain	34.484	Q
8	Helena Casas	Spain	34.516	Q
9	Urszula Łoś	Poland	34.886	
10	Miriam Vece	Italy	35.086	
11	Laurine van Riessen	Netherlands	35.346	
12	Sophie Capewell	Great Britain	35.408	
13	Aleksandra Tolomanow	Poland	36.316	

=== Final ===
Rank	Name	Nation	Time	Notes
1st place, gold medalist(s)	Miriam Welte	Germany	33.321	
2nd place, silver medalist(s)	Pauline Grabosch	Germany	33.559	
3rd place, bronze medalist(s)	Daria Shmeleva	Russia	33.757	
4	Olena Starikova	Ukraine	33.824	
5	Tania Calvo	Spain	34.153	
6	Katy Marchant	Great Britain	34.486	
7	Helena Casas	Spain	34.771	
8	Kyra Lamberink	Netherlands	34.777	
