= List of South African records in track cycling =

The following are the national records in track cycling in South Africa maintained by South Africa's national cycling federation: Cycling South Africa.

== Men ==
Key to tables: Awaiting ratification Record not kept by Cycling South Africa Not ratified or later rescinded by the Cycling South Africa

Event	Record	Athlete	Date	Meet	Place	Ref
Flying 200m time trial	9.786	Bernard Esterhuizen	19 January 2013	World Cup	Aguascalientes, Mexico	
Flying 500m time trial						
500m time trial						
1km time trial	1:00.673	Bernard Esterhuizen	7 December 2013	World Cup	Aguascalientes, Mexico	
1 km time trial (sea level)						
Team sprint	45.845	Jean Spies; Wikus Myburgh; Mitchell Sparrow	5 March 2023	African Championships	Cairo, Egypt	
4000m individual pursuit	4:20.179	Gert Fouche	19 August 2019		Aguascalientes, Mexico	
4000m team pursuit	4:11.711	Steven van Heerden; David Maree; Nolan Hoffman; Gert Fouche	5 April 2018	Commonwealth Games	Brisbane, Australia	
Hour record	51.599 km	Gert Fouche	21 August 2019		Aguascalientes, Mexico	

== Women ==
Event	Record	Athlete	Date	Meet	Place	Ref
Flying 200m time trial	10.974	Charlene du Preez	6 August 2021	Olympic Games	Izu, Japan	
250m time trial (standing start)	20.713	Charlene du Preez	2 March 2019	World Championships	Pruszków, Poland	
Flying 500m time trial						
500m time trial	35.183	Charlene du Preez	29 February 2020	World Championships	Berlin, Germany	
Flying 1km time trial						
1km time trial						
Team sprint (500 m)	37.10	Charlene du Preez; Magdalene Nicholson	15 December 2018		Bellville, South Africa	
Team sprint (750 m)	58.74	Tia Marnewick; Jessie Woods; Anya du Plessis	5 April 2023		Bellville, South Africa	
3000m individual pursuit	3:45.641	Kerry Jonker	21 January 2022	Adelaide Track League	Adelaide, Australia	
4000m team pursuit	4:49.549	Charlissa Schultz; Danielle van Niekerk; Ainsli de Beer; S'annara Grove	5 March 2023	African Championships	Cairo, Egypt	
Hour record	41.386 km	Adelia Reyneke	24 March 2015		Sydney, Australia	
