= List of African records in track cycling =

African records in the sport of track cycling are ratified by the Confédération Africaine de Cyclisme (CAC).

== Men ==
Event	Record	Athlete	Nationality	Date	Meet	Place	Ref
Flying 200 m time trial	9.786	Bernard Esterhuizen	South Africa	19 January 2013	World Cup	Aguascalientes, Mexico	
Flying 500 m time trial							
500 m time trial							
1 km time trial	1:00.673	Bernard Esterhuizen	South Africa	7 December 2013	World Cup	Aguascalientes, Mexico	
Team sprint	45.845	Jean Spies; Wikus Myburgh; Mitchell Sparrow	South Africa	5 March 2023	African Championships	Cairo, Egypt	
4000m individual pursuit	4:20.179	Gert Fouche	South Africa	19 August 2019		Aguascalientes, Mexico	
4000m team pursuit	4:11.711	Steven van Heerden; David Maree; Nolan Hoffman; Gert Fouche	South Africa	5 April 2018	Commonwealth Games	Brisbane, Australia	
Hour record	51.599 km	Gert Fouche	South Africa	21 August 2019		Aguascalientes, Mexico	

== Women ==
Event	Record	Athlete	Nationality	Date	Meet	Place	Ref
Flying 200 m time trial	10.974	Charlene du Preez	South Africa	6 August 2021	Olympic Games	Izu, Japan	
250 m time trial (standing start)	20.713	Charlene du Preez	South Africa	2 March 2019	World Championships	Pruszków, Poland	
Flying 500 m time trial							
500 m time trial	35.183	Charlene du Preez	South Africa	29 February 2020	World Championships	Berlin, Germany	
Flying 1 km time trial							
1 km time trial							
Team sprint (500 m)	37.10	Charlene du Preez; Magdalene Nicholson	South Africa	15 December 2018		Bellville, South Africa	
Team sprint (750 m)							
3000m individual pursuit	3:45.641	Kerry Jonker	South Africa	21 January 2022	Adelaide Track League	Adelaide, Australia	
3000m team pursuit							
4000m team pursuit	4:49.549	Charlissa Schultz; Danielle van Niekerk; Ainsli de Beer; S'annara Grove	South Africa	5 March 2023	African Championships	Cairo, Egypt	
Hour record							
