= 2019 UEC European Track Championships – Women's 500 m time trial =

Event at 2019 UEC European Track Championships

Women's 500 m time trial at the 2019 UEC European Track Championships
- Venue: Omnisport Apeldoorn, Apeldoorn
- Date: 20 October
- Competitors: 13 from 9 nations
- Winning time: 33.005

Medalists
gold medal	Anastasia Voynova	Russia
silver medal	Daria Shmeleva	Russia
bronze medal	Olena Starikova	Ukraine

The women's 500 m time trial competition at the 2019 UEC European Track Championships was held on 20 October 2019.

== Results ==
=== Qualifying ===
The top 8 riders qualified for the final.

Rank	Name	Nation	Time	Behind	Notes
1	Anastasia Voynova	Russia	33.611		Q
2	Olena Starikova	Ukraine	33.706	+0.095	Q
3	Daria Shmeleva	Russia	33.827	+0.216	Q
4	Kyra Lamberink	Netherlands	33.952	+0.341	Q
5	Lea Friedrich	Germany	34.154	+0.543	Q
6	Urszula Łoś	Poland	34.161	+0.550	Q
7	Miriam Vece	Italy	34.242	+0.631	Q
8	Tania Calvo	Spain	34.591	+0.980	Q
9	Steffie van der Peet	Netherlands	34.698	+1.087	
10	Marlena Karwacka	Poland	34.706	+1.095	
11	Helena Casas	Spain	34.995	+1.384	
12	Sára Kaňkovská	Czech Republic	35.809	+2.198	
13	Eimear McMullan	Ireland	36.649	+3.038	

=== Final ===
Rank	Name	Nation	Time	Behind	Notes
1st place, gold medalist(s)	Anastasia Voynova	Russia	33.005		
2nd place, silver medalist(s)	Daria Shmeleva	Russia	33.057	+0.052	
3rd place, bronze medalist(s)	Olena Starikova	Ukraine	33.328	+0.323	
4	Lea Friedrich	Germany	34.044	+1.039	
5	Urszula Łoś	Poland	34.067	+1.062	
6	Miriam Vece	Italy	34.112	+1.107	
7	Kyra Lamberink	Netherlands	34.160	+1.155	
8	Tania Calvo	Spain	34.581	+1.576	
