= Bissolati =

Bissolati is an Italian surname from Cremona. Notable people with the surname include:

- Elena Bissolati (born 1997), Italian racing cyclist
- Leonida Bissolati (1857–1920), Italian politician
