= 2020 UEC European Track Championships – Women's team sprint =

Cycling race

Women's team sprint at the 2020 UEC European Track Championships
- Venue: Kolodruma, Plovdiv
- Date: 11 November
- Competitors: 14 from 4 nations
- Winning time: 46.852

Medalists
gold medal	Anastasia Voynova; Daria Shmeleva; Natalia Antonova; Ekaterina Rogovaya	Russia
silver medal	Milly Tanner; Blaine Ridge-Davis; Lusia Steele; Lauren Bate	Great Britain
bronze medal	Liubov Basova; Olena Starikova; Oleksandra Lohviniuk	Ukraine

The women's team sprint competition at the 2020 UEC European Track Championships was held on 11 November 2020.

== Results ==
=== Qualifying ===
All teams advanced to the first round.

Rank	Name	Nation	Time	Behind	Notes
1	Anastasia Voynova; Daria Shmeleva; Ekaterina Rogovaya	Russia	47.649		
2	Milly Tanner; Lauren Bate; Lusia Steele	Great Britain	48.646	+0.997	
3	Liubov Basova; Olena Starikova; Oleksandra Lohviniuk	Ukraine	49.981	+2.332	
4	Sára Kaňkovská; Petra Ševčíková; Veronika Jaborníková	Czech Republic	52.005	+4.356	

=== First round ===
First round heats were held as follows:
Heat 1: 2nd v 3rd fastest
Heat 2: 1st v 4th fastest

The winners of each heat proceeded to the gold medal race. The remaining two teams proceeded to the bronze medal race.

Rank	Name	Nation	Time	Behind	Notes
1 vs 4
1	Anastasia Voynova; Daria Shmeleva; Natalia Antonova	Russia	47.240		QG
2	Sára Kaňkovská; Petra Ševčíková; Veronika Jaborníková	Czech Republic	52.051	+4.811	QB
2 vs 3
1	Milly Tanner; Blaine Ridge-Davis; Lusia Steele	Great Britain	48.116		QG
2	Liubov Basova; Olena Starikova; Oleksandra Lohviniuk	Ukraine	49.061	+0.945	QB

=== Finals ===
Rank	Name	Nation	Time	Behind	Notes
Gold medal final
1st place, gold medalist(s)	Anastasia Voynova; Daria Shmeleva; Natalia Antonova	Russia	46.852		
2nd place, silver medalist(s)	Milly Tanner; Blaine Ridge-Davis; Lusia Steele	Great Britain	48.531	+1.679	
Bronze medal final
3rd place, bronze medalist(s)	Liubov Basova; Olena Starikova; Oleksandra Lohviniuk	Ukraine	49.296		
4	Sára Kaňkovská; Petra Ševčíková; Veronika Jaborníková	Czech Republic	51.789	+2.493	
