= Lusia Steele =

British cyclist

Personal information
- Born: 21 June 2000 (age 26) Paisley, Scotland

Cycling career
- Sport: Cycling
- Role: Rider
- Rider type: Track sprinter
Medal record
Women's track cycling
Representing Great Britain
European Championships
Silver medal – second place	2020 Plovdiv	Team sprint

Lusia Steele (born 21 June 2000) is a Scottish racing cyclist.

== Biography ==
Steele starting riding for her local club, the Johnstone Jets in 2008. In 2016, Steele won seven Scottish titles during the year. In late November of that year, Steele took part in the Scottish Cycling Performance Programme, as part of her preparation to move up to the junior level.

In August 2018, Steele made her debut for the British team at the 2018 UCI Junior Track Cycling World Championships in Switzerland. Out of the fourteen riders, she was the only Scottish cyclist on the team for the Championships. A month prior to the Junior Track Cycling World Championships, Steele had won two British Junior titles.

In November 2020, she competed in the women's team sprint event at the 2020 UEC European Track Championships in Plovdiv, Bulgaria, winning the silver medal. On her return to Scotland following the Championships in Bulgaria, Steele was praised by local councilors from Renfrewshire, saying that she had "put Renfrewshire on the map". Following her success in Bulgaria, Steele said her next targets are the 2022 Commonwealth Games in Birmingham, and the 2024 Summer Olympics in Paris. Steele was also named as one of the five finalists for the Glasgow Times Young Scotswoman of the Year award.
