= 2014 UCI Track Cycling World Championships – Women's 500 m time trial =

The Women's 500 m time trial at the 2014 UCI Track Cycling World Championships was held on 27 February 2014. 16 cyclists participated in the contest.

== Medalists ==
Gold	Miriam Welte (GER)
Silver	Anna Meares (AUS)
Bronze	Anastasiia Voinova (RUS)

== Results ==
The race was started at 18:30.

Rank	Name	Nation	Time	Notes
1st place, gold medalist(s)	Miriam Welte	Germany	33.451	
2nd place, silver medalist(s)	Anna Meares	Australia	33.548	
3rd place, bronze medalist(s)	Anastasiia Voinova	Russia	33.789	
4	Lisandra Guerra	Cuba	33.845	
5	Elis Ligtlee	Netherlands	33.909	
6	Lee Wai Sze	Hong Kong	33.983	
7	Becky James	Great Britain	34.021	
8	Sandie Clair	France	34.097	
9	Tania Calvo	Spain	34.157	
10	Victoria Williamson	Great Britain	34.305	
11	Shi Jingjing	China	34.400	
12	Juliana Gaviria	Colombia	34.684	
13	Shanne Braspennincx	Netherlands	35.121	
14	Olena Tsyos	Ukraine	35.442	
15	Kayono Maeda	Japan	35.499	
16	Frany Fong	Mexico	35.546	
