= 2012 European Track Championships – Women's team sprint =

UEC European Champion jersey

The women's team sprint was held on 19 October 2012. Four nations participated.

== Medalists ==
| Gold | Lithuania; Simona Krupeckaitė; Gintarė Gaivenytė |
| Silver | Russia; Anastasiia Voinova; Daria Shmeleva |
| Bronze | France; Sandie Clair; Olivia Montauban |

== Results ==
The fastest 2 teams raced for gold and 3rd and 4th teams raced for bronze.

=== Qualifying ===
It was held at 14:27.

| Rank | Name | Nation | Time | Notes |
|---|---|---|---|---|
| 1 | Simona Krupeckaitė; Gintarė Gaivenytė | Lithuania | 33.833 | Q |
| 2 | Anastasiia Voinova; Daria Shmeleva | Russia | 34.131 | Q |
| 3 | Sandie Clair; Olivia Montauban | France | 34.723 | q |
| 4 | Małgorzata Wojtyra; Natalia Rutkowska | Poland | 35.678 | q |

=== Finals ===
The finals were held at 20:16.

| Rank | Name | Nation | Time |
|---|---|---|---|
Gold Medal Race
| 1st place, gold medalist(s) | Simona Krupeckaitė; Gintarė Gaivenytė | Lithuania | 33.846 |
| 2nd place, silver medalist(s) | Anastasiia Voinova; Daria Shmeleva | Russia | 33.882 |
Bronze Medal Race
| 3rd place, bronze medalist(s) | Sandie Clair; Olivia Montauban | France | 34.975 |
| 4 | Małgorzata Wojtyra; Natalia Rutkowska | Poland | 35.947 |
