= 2019 UEC European Track Championships =

Cycling championships

- Venue: Apeldoorn, Netherlands
- Date: 16–20 October
- Velodrome: Omnisport Apeldoorn
- Events: 22 (11 women, 11 men)

The 2019 UEC European Track Championships was the tenth edition of the elite UEC European Track Championships in track cycling and took place at the Omnisport Apeldoorn in Apeldoorn, Netherlands, between 16 and 20 October 2019. The event was organised by the European Cycling Union. All European champions were awarded the UEC European Champion jersey which may be worn by the champion throughout the year when competing in the same event at other competitions.

== Schedule ==
Competition	F	Final

Men
Date →	Wed 16		Thu 17		Fri 18		Sat 19		Sun 20	
Event ↓	A	E	A	E	A	E	A	E	M	A
Sprint			Q,^{1}/_{16},^{1}/_{8}	QF		SF, F				
Team sprint	Q	R1, F								
Team pursuit	Q	R1		F						
Keirin							R1, R	R2, F		
Omnium					SR, TR	ER, PR				
Madison										F
1 km time trial									Q	F
Pursuit							Q	F		
Points race								F		
Scratch				F						
Elimination race		F								

Women
Date →	Wed 16		Thu 17		Fri 18		Sat 19		Sun 20	
Event ↓	A	E	A	E	A	E	A	E	M	A
Sprint			Q,^{1}/_{16},^{1}/_{8}	QF		SF, F				
Team sprint	Q	R1, F								
Team pursuit	Q	R1		F						
Keirin							R1, R	R2, F		
Omnium					SR, TR	ER, PR				
Madison										F
500 m time trial									Q	F
Pursuit					Q	F				
Points race								F		
Scratch		F								
Elimination race				F						

M = Morning session, A = Afternoon session, E = Evening session
Q = qualifiers, R1 = first round, R2 = second round, R = repechages, ^{1}/_{16} = sixteenth finals, ^{1}/_{8} = eighth finals, QF = quarterfinals, SF = semifinals,
SR = Scratch Race, TR = Tempo Race, ER = Elimination Race, PR = Points Race

== Events ==
Event	Gold		Silver		Bronze	
Men's Events
Sprint	Jeffrey Hoogland; Netherlands		Harrie Lavreysen; Netherlands		Mateusz Rudyk; Poland	
Team Sprint	Netherlands; Jeffrey Hoogland; Harrie Lavreysen; Roy van den Berg; Matthijs Büchli	42.151	Great Britain; Jack Carlin; Jason Kenny; Ryan Owens	42.822	France; Grégory Baugé; Quentin Lafargue; Sébastien Vigier; Melvin Landerneau	43.206
Team Pursuit	Denmark; Lasse Norman Hansen; Julius Johansen; Frederik Madsen; Rasmus Pedersen	3:49.113	Italy; Michele Scartezzini; Filippo Ganna; Francesco Lamon; Davide Plebani; Simone Consonni	3:54.117	Great Britain; Ed Clancy; Ethan Hayter; Charlie Tanfield; Oliver Wood	3:51.600
Keirin	Harrie Lavreysen; Netherlands		Denis Dmitriev; Russia		Matthijs Büchli; Netherlands	
Omnium	Benjamin Thomas; France	173 pts	Lasse Norman Hansen; Denmark	162 pts	Oliver Wood; Great Britain	149 pts
Madison	Denmark; Lasse Norman Hansen; Michael Mørkøv	52 pts	Netherlands; Yoeri Havik; Jan-Willem van Schip	37 pts	Germany; Maximilian Beyer; Theo Reinhardt	37 pts
1km Time Trial^{[N]}	Quentin Lafargue; France	1:00.289	Theo Bos; Netherlands	1:00.409	Michaël D'Almeida; France	1:00.663
Pursuit^{[N]}	Corentin Ermenault; France	4:14.358	Domenic Weinstein; Germany	4:15.918	Felix Groß; Germany	4:13.240
Points Race^{[O]}	Bryan Coquard; France	98 pts	Jan-Willem van Schip; Netherlands	93 pts	Michele Scartezzini; Italy	88 pts
Scratch Race^{[O]}	Sebastián Mora; Spain		Christos Volikakis; Greece		Wim Stroetinga; Netherlands	
Elimination Race^{[O]}	Elia Viviani; Italy		Bryan Coquard; France		Filip Prokopyszyn; Poland	
Women's Events
Sprint	Anastasia Voynova; Russia		Olena Starikova; Ukraine		Lea Friedrich; Germany	
Team Sprint	Russia; Anastasia Voynova; Daria Shmeleva; Ekaterina Rogovaya	32.496	Germany; Lea Friedrich; Emma Hinze	33.179	Netherlands; Kyra Lamberink; Shanne Braspennincx; Steffie van der Peet	33.023
Team Pursuit	Great Britain; Katie Archibald; Ellie Dickinson; Neah Evans; Laura Kenny; Elinor Barker	4:13.828	Germany; Franziska Brauße; Lisa Brennauer; Lisa Klein; Gudrun Stock; Mieke Kröger	4:16.789	Italy; Elisa Balsamo; Martina Alzini; Vittoria Guazzini; Letizia Paternoster; Marta Cavalli	4:17.610
Keirin	Mathilde Gros; France		Lea Friedrich; Germany		Daria Shmeleva; Russia	
Omnium	Kirsten Wild; Netherlands	116 pts	Laura Kenny; Great Britain	114 pts	Tatsiana Sharakova; Belarus	112 pts
Madison	Denmark; Amalie Dideriksen; Julie Leth	33 pts	Great Britain; Katie Archibald; Laura Kenny	31 pts	Netherlands; Amy Pieters; Kirsten Wild	23 pts
500m Time Trial^{[N]}	Anastasia Voynova; Russia	33.005	Daria Shmeleva; Russia	33.057	Olena Starikova; Ukraine	33.328
Pursuit^{[N]}	Franziska Brauße; Germany	3:25.002	Lisa Brennauer; Germany	3:26.190	Katie Archibald; Great Britain	3:31.602
Points Race^{[O]}	Maria Giulia Confalonieri; Italy	46 pts	Tatsiana Sharakova; Belarus	44 pts	Hanna Solovey; Ukraine	38 pts
Scratch Race^{[O]}	Emily Nelson; Great Britain		Shannon McCurley; Ireland		Maria Martins; Portugal	
Elimination Race^{[O]}	Kirsten Wild; Netherlands		Emily Nelson; Great Britain		Nikol Płosaj; Poland	

- Competitors named in italics only participated in rounds prior to the final.
- ^{^{N}} These events are not contested in the Olympics.
- ^{^{O}} In the Olympics, these events are contested within the omnium only.

== Medal table ==
* Host nation (Netherlands)

Rank	Nation	Gold	Silver	Bronze	Total
1	Netherlands*	5	4	4	13
2	France	5	1	2	8
3	Russia	3	2	1	6
4	Denmark	3	1	0	4
5	Great Britain	2	3	2	7
6	Italy	2	1	2	5
7	Spain	1	0	0	1
8	Germany	0	3	2	5
9	Ukraine	0	1	2	3
10	Belarus	0	1	1	2
11	Greece	0	1	0	1
11	Ireland	0	1	0	1
13	Poland	0	0	3	3
14	Portugal	0	0	1	1
Totals (14 entries)		21	19	20	60
