= World record progression track cycling – Women's 500 m time trial =

This is an overview of the progression of the World track cycling record of the women's 500 m time trial as recognised by the Union Cycliste Internationale.

== Progression ==
Time	Cyclist	Location	Track	Date	Meet
37"222	Lucy Vinnicombe (USA)	Launceston (AUS)	indoor	12 February 1993	
36"705	Tanya Dubnikoff (CAN)	Valencia (ESP)		13 June 1993	
35"811	Félicia Ballanger (FRA)	Hyères (FRA)		3 July 1993	
35"190	Félicia Ballanger (FRA)	Bordeaux (FRA)	indoor	28 July 1993	
34"604	Félicia Ballanger (FRA)	Hyères (FRA)		3 July 1994	
34"474	Félicia Ballanger (FRA)	Colorado Springs (USA)	open air	22 July 1994	
34"017	Félicia Ballanger (FRA)	Bogotá (COL)	open air	29 September 1995	
34"010	Félicia Ballanger (FRA)	Bordeaux (FRA)	indoor	29 August 1998	
34"000	Jiang Yonghua (CHN)	Kunming (CHN)	open air	11 August 2002	
33"952	Anna Meares (AUS)	Athens (GRE)	indoor	20 August 2004	
33"944	Anna Meares (AUS)	Sydney (AUS)	indoor	18 November 2006	
33"588	Anna Meares (AUS)	Palma de Mallorca (ESP)	indoor	31 March 2007	
33"296	Simona Krupeckaitė (LTU)	Pruszków (POL)	indoor	25 March 2009	
33"010	Anna Meares (AUS)	Melbourne (AUS)	indoor	8 April 2012	
32"836	Anna Meares (AUS)	Aguascalientes (MEX)	indoor	6 December 2013	World Cup
32"794	Anastasia Voynova (RUS)	Grenchen (SUI)	indoor	17 October 2015	European Championships
32"268	Jessica Salazar (MEX)	Aguascalientes (MEX)	indoor	7 October 2016	Pan American Championships
