= Tatiana Kiseleva =

Russian female track cyclist

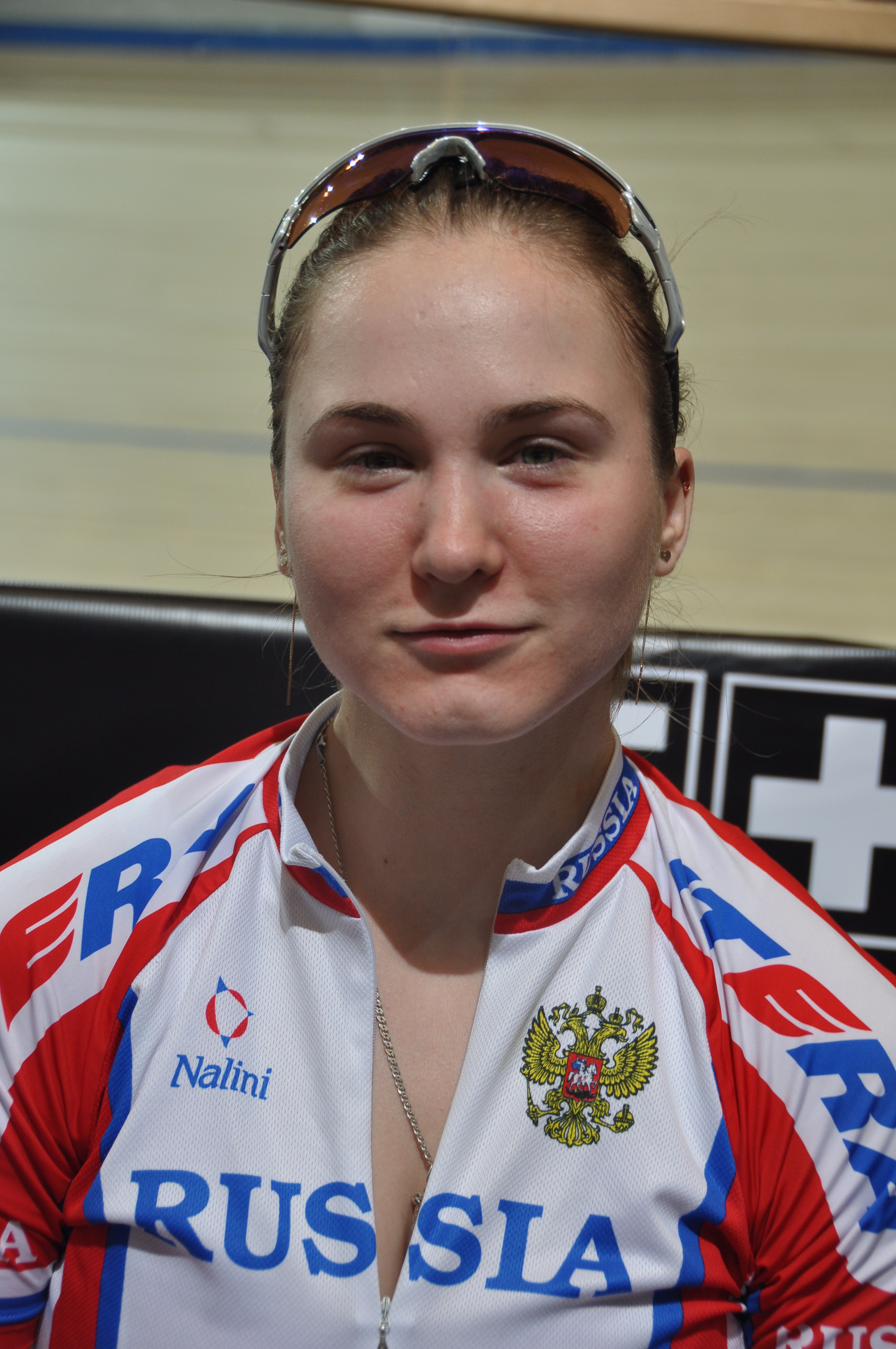
- Kiseleva in 2016

Personal information
- Born: 21 January 1996 (age 30)

Cycling career
- Sport: Cycling
- Discipline: Track cycling

Tatiana Kiseleva (born 21 January 1996) is a Russian female track cyclist, representing Russia at international competitions. She competed at the 2015 UEC European Track Championships and 2016 UEC European Track Championships. She won the bronze medal at the 2016–17 UCI Track Cycling World Cup, Round 1 in Glasgow in the team sprint.

== Career results ==
2014
3rd Team Sprint, Memorial of Alexander Lesnikov (with Natalia Antonova)
2015
2nd Team Sprint, Grand Prix Minsk (with Natalia Antonova)
2nd Team Sprint, Grand Prix of Tula (with Ekaterina Gnidenko)
2nd Team Sprint, Memorial of Alexander Lesnikov (with Natalia Antonova)
2016
6 giorni delle rose – Fiorenzuola

1st Keirin
1st Sprint

Memorial of Alexander Lesnikov

2nd Keirin
2nd Team Sprint (with Ekaterina Gnidenko)

2nd Team Sprint, Grand Prix of Tula (with Ekaterina Gnidenko)
UEC European U23 Championships

2nd Sprint
2nd Team Sprint (with Natalia Antonova)
2nd 500m Time Trial

2017
2nd Sprint, Grand Prix Minsk
International track race – Panevežys

2nd Keirin
2nd Sprint

3rd Sprint, Grand Prix of Tula
Grand Prix of Moscow

3rd Sprint
3rd 500m Time Trial
