= Ekaterina Rogovaya =

Russian cyclist (born 1995)

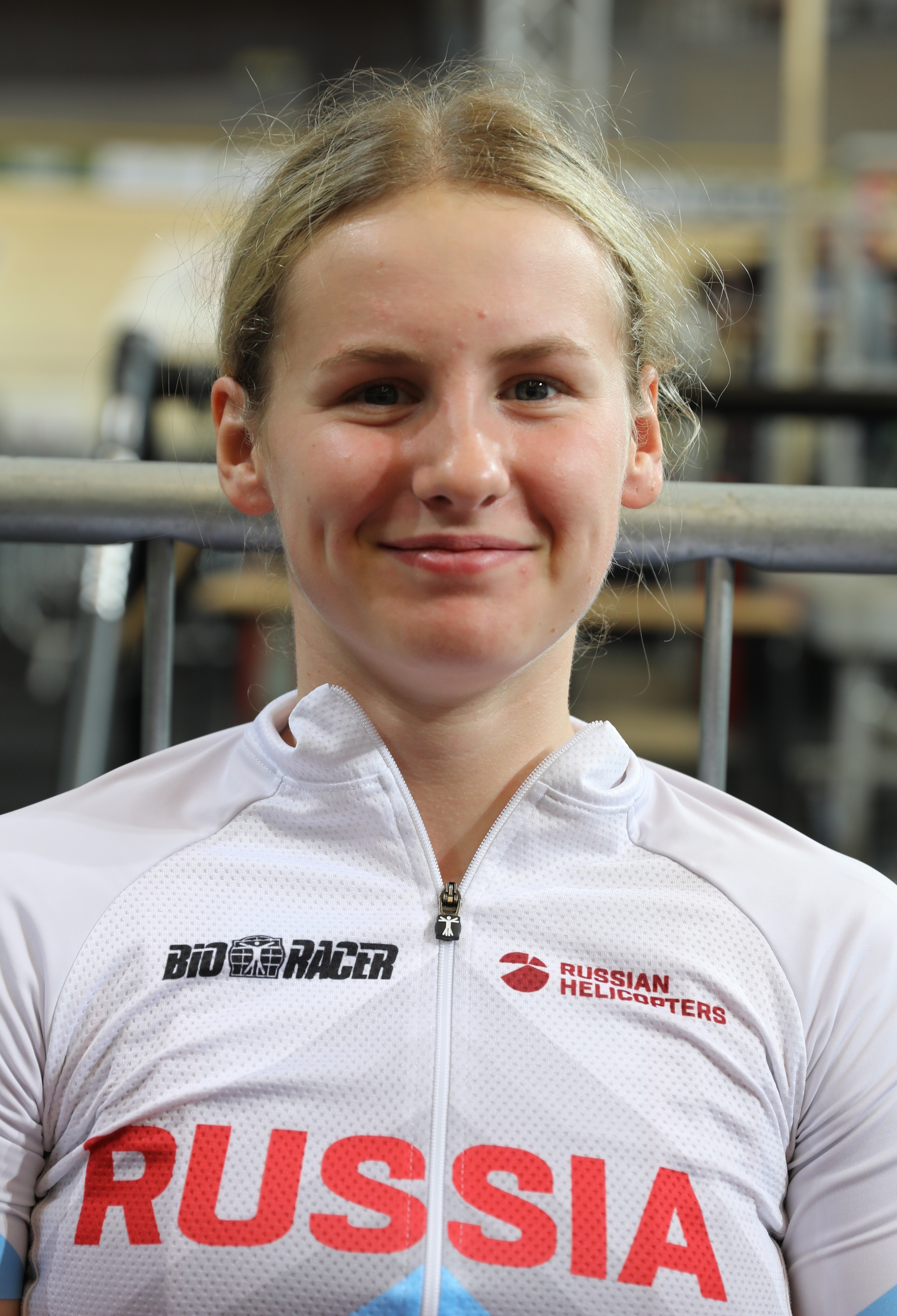
- Ekaterina Rogovaya (2019)

Personal information
- Born: 7 October 1995 (age 31)

Cycling career
- Sport: Cycling
- Role: Rider
Medal record
Women's track cycling
Representing Russia
European Games
| Gold medal – first place | 2019 Minsk | Team sprint |
European Championships
| Gold medal – first place | 2019 Apeldoorn | Team sprint |
| Gold medal – first place | 2020 Plovdiv | Team sprint |
Junior World Championships
| Silver medal – second place | 2013 Glasgow | Team Sprint |
U23 & Junior European Championships
| Gold medal – first place | 2013 Anadia | Junior Team sprint |

Ekaterina Rogovaya (born 7 October 1995) is a Russian professional racing cyclist. In October 2019, she won the gold medal in the women's team sprint event at the 2019 UEC European Track Championships.
