= Natalia Antonova =

Russian cyclist (born 1995)

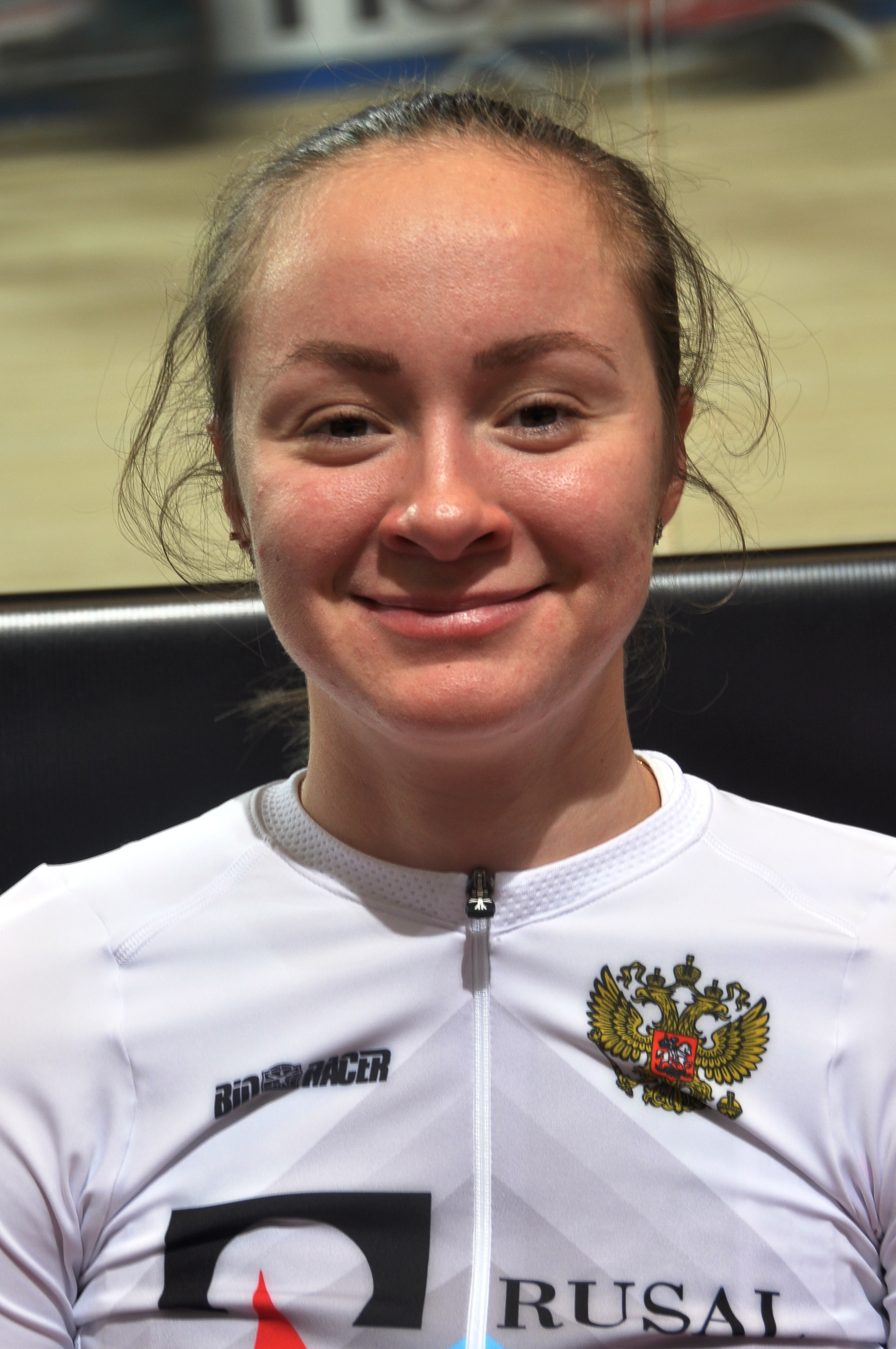
- Antonova in 2016

Personal information
- Born: 25 May 1995 (age 31) Saint Petersburg, Russia

Cycling career
- Sport: Cycling
- Discipline: Track cycling
Medal record
Women's track cycling
Representing Russian Cycling Federation
World Championships
| Silver medal – second place | 2021 Roubaix | Team sprint |
Representing Russia
European Championships
| Gold medal – first place | 2020 Plovdiv | Team sprint |
| Bronze medal – third place | 2021 Grenchen | Team sprint |

Natalia Antonova (born 25 May 1995) is a Russian track cyclist, representing Russia at international competitions. She won the bronze medal at the 2016–17 UCI Track Cycling World Cup, Round 1 in Glasgow in the team sprint.

== Career results ==
2014
3rd Team Sprint, Memorial of Alexander Lesnikov (with Tatiana Kiseleva)
2015
2nd Team Sprint, Grand Prix Minsk (with Tatiana Kiseleva)
2nd Team Sprint, Memorial of Alexander Lesnikov (with Tatiana Kiseleva)
2016
2nd Team Sprint, UEC European U23 Championships (with Tatiana Kiseleva)
2017
1st 500m Time Trial, Grand Prix of Moscow
Prilba Moravy

2nd Keirin
2nd Sprint

3rd Keirin, Grand Prix of Tula
