= Charlene du Preez =

South African cyclist (born 1987)

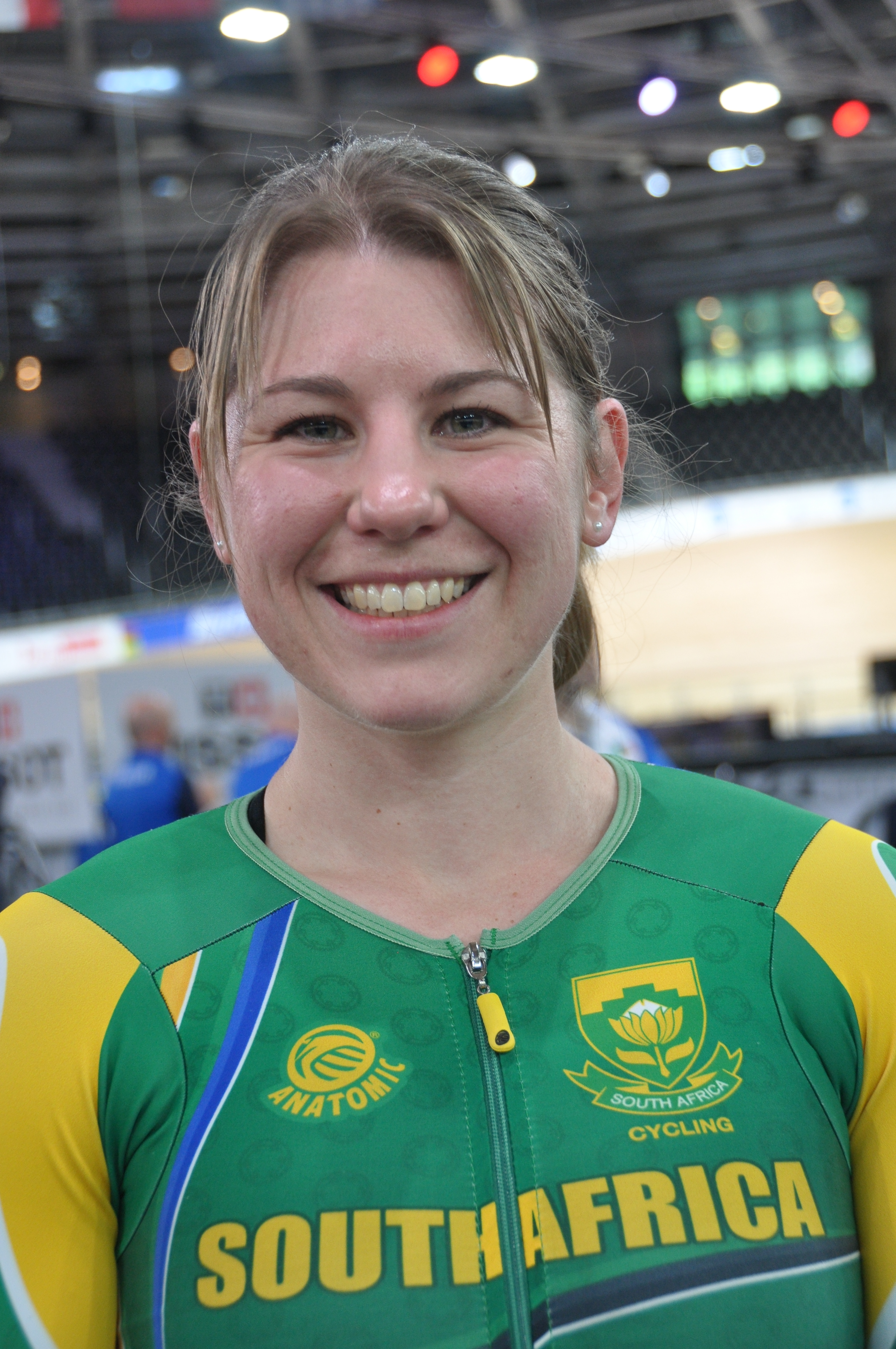
Charlene du Preez

Charlene du Preez (née Roux; born 4 December 1987) is a professional road and track cyclist from South Africa.

== Career ==
Initially a road cyclist, du Preez was introduced to track racing in 2015. In 2018 she competed at the Commonwealth Games. In the Individual pursuit she finished 18th, and with the South African team in sixth place in the team pursuit.

In Pietermaritzburg in 2019 she became the African 500 meters champion, the African keirin champion and the African Individual Sprint Champion. In Cairo in 2020 she successfully defended all three of her titles and added the Team Sprint gold with Claudia Gnudi. She won all three individual titles again in 2021 for the third consecutive year. She holds 6 African track records.

She competed in both the women's sprint and the women's keirin at the 2020 Summer Olympics.

== Major results ==
2015
KZN Autumn Series

6th Freedom Day Classic
6th Hibiscus Cycle Classic

2016
9th 94.7 Cycle Challenge
2017
3rd Road race, African Road Championships
2019
African Track Championships

1st 500m time trial
1st Keirin
1st Sprint

2020
African Track Championships

1st 500m time trial
1st Keirin
1st Sprint
1st Team sprint

2021
African Track Championships

1st 500m time trial
1st Keirin
1st Sprint
