= Daria Shmeleva =

Russian cyclist (born 1994)

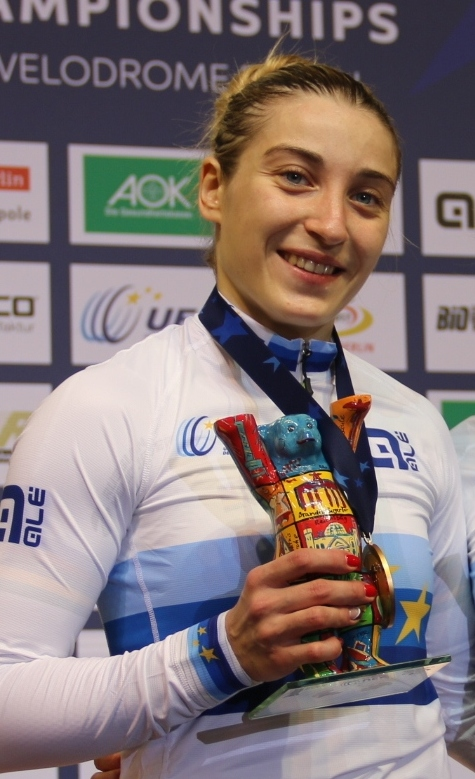
- Shmeleva in 2017

Personal information
- Born: 26 October 1994 (age 31) Moscow, Russia
- Height: 1.64 m (5 ft 5 in)
- Weight: 64 kg (141 lb)

Cycling career
- Sport: Cycling
- Discipline: Track
- Role: Rider
Medal record
Women's track cycling
Representing ROC
Olympic Games
Bronze medal – third place	2020 Tokyo	Team sprint
Representing Russian Cycling Federation
World Championships
Silver medal – second place	2021 Roubaix	Team sprint
Bronze medal – third place	2021 Roubaix	500 m time trial
Representing Russia
Olympic Games
Silver medal – second place	2016 Rio de Janeiro	Team sprint
World Championships
Gold medal – first place	2016 London	Team sprint
Gold medal – first place	2017 Hong Kong	500 m time trial
Gold medal – first place	2017 Hong Kong	Team sprint
Gold medal – first place	2019 Pruszków	500 m time trial
Silver medal – second place	2015 Yvelines	Team sprint
Silver medal – second place	2018 Apeldoorn	500 m time trial
Silver medal – second place	2019 Pruszków	Team sprint
Bronze medal – third place	2018 Apeldoorn	Team sprint
Bronze medal – third place	2019 Pruszków	Keirin
European Games
Gold medal – first place	2019 Minsk	500 m time trial
Gold medal – first place	2019 Minsk	Team sprint
Bronze medal – third place	2019 Minsk	Keirin
Bronze medal – third place	2019 Minsk	Sprint
European Championships
Gold medal – first place	2014 Baie-Mahault	Team sprint
Gold medal – first place	2015 Grenchen	Team sprint
Gold medal – first place	2016 Yvelines	500 m time trial
Gold medal – first place	2016 Yvelines	Team sprint
Gold medal – first place	2017 Berlin	Team sprint
Gold medal – first place	2018 Glasgow	Sprint
Gold medal – first place	2018 Glasgow	Team sprint
Gold medal – first place	2018 Glasgow	500 m time trial
Gold medal – first place	2019 Apeldoorn	Team sprint
Gold medal – first place	2020 Plovdiv	500 m time trial
Gold medal – first place	2020 Plovdiv	Team sprint
Gold medal – first place	2021 Grenchen	500 m time trial
Silver medal – second place	2012 Panevėžys	Team sprint
Silver medal – second place	2019 Apeldoorn	500 m time trial
Silver medal – second place	2020 Plovdiv	Sprint
Bronze medal – third place	2015 Grenchen	500 m time trial
Bronze medal – third place	2017 Berlin	Sprint
Bronze medal – third place	2017 Berlin	500 m time trial
Bronze medal – third place	2018 Glasgow	Keirin
Bronze medal – third place	2019 Apeldoorn	Keirin
Bronze medal – third place	2021 Grenchen	Team sprint
Junior World Championships
Gold medal – first place	2011 Moscow	Team sprint
Gold medal – first place	2012 Invercargill	Sprint
Gold medal – first place	2012 Invercargill	Keirin
Gold medal – first place	2012 Invercargill	500 m time trial
Gold medal – first place	2012 Invercargill	Team sprint
U23 & Junior European Championships
Gold medal – first place	2012 Anadia	Junior Keirin
Gold medal – first place	2012 Anadia	Junior 500 m time trial
Gold medal – first place	2014 Anadia	U23 Team sprint
Gold medal – first place	2015 Athens	U23 Team sprint
Silver medal – second place	2013 Anadia	U23 500 m time trial
Silver medal – second place	2014 Anadia	U23 500 m time trial
Silver medal – second place	2015 Athens	U23 500 m time trial

Daria Mikhailovna Shmeleva (Russian: Дарья Михайловна Шмелёва, IPA: [ˈdarʲjə ʂmʲɪˈlʲɵvə]; born 26 October 1994) is a Russian professional track cyclist. She rode at the 2015 UCI Track Cycling World Championships along with Anastasia Voynova and won silver medal in the team sprint event.

== Major results ==
2013
2nd 500m Time Trial, UEC European U23 Track Championships
2014
1st Team Sprint, UEC European Track Championships (with Elena Brejniva and Anastasia Voynova)
Memorial of Alexander Lesnikov

1st Team Sprint (with Anastasia Voynova)
2nd Keirin
3rd 500m Time Trial

1st Team Sprint GP von Deutschland im Sprint (with Anastasia Voynova)
UEC European U23 Track Championships

1st Team Sprint (with Anastasia Voynova)
2nd 500m Time Trial

Grand Prix of Tula

2nd 500m Time Trial
3rd Keirin
3rd Team Sprint (with Lidiya Pluzhnikova)

2015
UEC European Track Championships

1st Team Sprint (with Anastasia Voynova)
3rd 500m Time Trial

1st Team Sprint, Grand Prix of Tula (with Anastasia Voynova)
Memorial of Alexander Lesnikov

1st Team Sprint (with Anastasia Voynova)
3rd Keirin
3rd Sprint

UEC European U23 Track Championships

1st Team Sprint (with Anastasia Voynova)
2nd 500m Time Trial

2nd Team Sprint, GP von Deutschland im Sprint (with Anastasia Voynova)
2nd Sprint, Trofeu CAR Anadia Portugal
3rd 500m Time Trial, Cottbuser SprintCup
2016
1st Team Sprint, Memorial of Alexander Lesnikov (with Anastasia Voynova)
1st Team Sprint, Grand Prix of Tula (with Anastasia Voynova)
Panevežys

2nd Sprint
3rd Keirin

Grand Prix Minsk

2nd 500m Time Trial
3rd Sprint

2017
UCI World Track Championships

1st Team Sprint (with Anastasia Voynova)
1st 500m Time Trial

UEC European Track Championships

1st Team Sprint (with Anastasia Voynova)
3rd Sprint
3rd 500m Time Trial

Grand Prix of Tula

1st Keirin
2nd Sprint

Prilba Moravy

1st Keirin
1st Sprint

2nd Sprint, Grand Prix of Moscow
