= Anastasia Voynova =

Russian cyclist (born 1993)

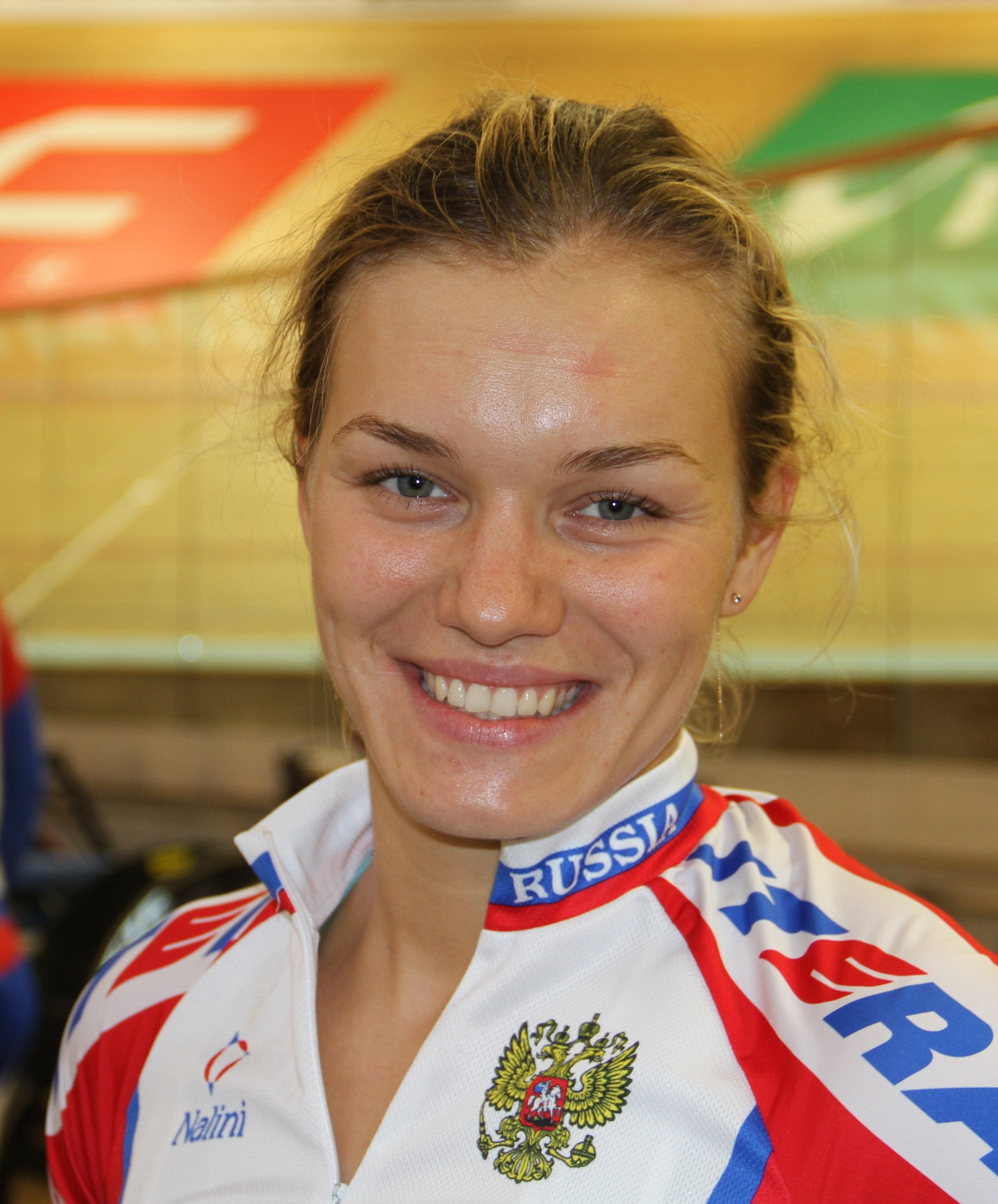
- Voynova in 2015

Personal information
- Full name: Anastasia Sergeyevna Voynova
- Born: 5 February 1993 (age 33) Tula, Russia
- Height: 1.62 m (5 ft 4 in)
- Weight: 60 kg (132 lb)

Cycling career
- Sport: Cycling
- Current team: RusVelo
- Discipline: Track
- Role: Rider
- Rider type: Sprinter
Medal record
Women's track cycling
Representing ROC
Olympic Games
Bronze medal – third place	2020 Tokyo	Team sprint
Representing Russian Cycling Federation
World Championships
Silver medal – second place	2021 Roubaix	500 m time trial
Silver medal – second place	2021 Roubaix	Team sprint
Representing Russia
Olympic Games
Silver medal – second place	2016 Rio de Janeiro	Team sprint
World Championships
Gold medal – first place	2015 Yvelines	500m time trial
Gold medal – first place	2016 London	Team sprint
Gold medal – first place	2016 London	500m time trial
Gold medal – first place	2017 Hong Kong	Team sprint
Silver medal – second place	2015 Yvelines	Team sprint
Silver medal – second place	2019 Pruszków	Team sprint
Silver medal – second place	2020 Berlin	Sprint
Bronze medal – third place	2014 Cali	500m time trial
Bronze medal – third place	2017 Hong Kong	500m time trial
Bronze medal – third place	2018 Apeldoorn	Team sprint
European Games
Gold medal – first place	2019 Minsk	Sprint
Gold medal – first place	2019 Minsk	Team sprint
European Championships
Gold medal – first place	2014 Guadeloupe	Sprint
Gold medal – first place	2014 Guadeloupe	Team sprint
Gold medal – first place	2014 Guadeloupe	500m time trial
Gold medal – first place	2015 Grenchen	500m time trial
Gold medal – first place	2015 Grenchen	Team sprint
Gold medal – first place	2016 Yvelines	Team sprint
Gold medal – first place	2017 Berlin	Team sprint
Gold medal – first place	2018 Glasgow	Team sprint
Gold medal – first place	2019 Apeldoorn	Sprint
Gold medal – first place	2019 Apeldoorn	500 m time trial
Gold medal – first place	2019 Apeldoorn	Team sprint
Gold medal – first place	2020 Plovdiv	Sprint
Gold medal – first place	2020 Plovdiv	Team sprint
Silver medal – second place	2012 Panevėžys	Sprint
Silver medal – second place	2012 Panevėžys	Team sprint
Silver medal – second place	2015 Grenchen	Sprint
Silver medal – second place	2016 Yvelines	Sprint
Silver medal – second place	2018 Glasgow	Sprint
Silver medal – second place	2020 Plovdiv	500m time trial
Bronze medal – third place	2016 Yvelines	500m time trial
Bronze medal – third place	2021 Grenchen	Team sprint
Junior World Championships
Gold medal – first place	2010 Montichiari	Team sprint
Gold medal – first place	2011 Moscow	Sprint
Gold medal – first place	2011 Moscow	Keirin
Gold medal – first place	2011 Moscow	Team sprint
U23 & Junior European Championships
Gold medal – first place	2010 Saint Petersburg	Keirin
Gold medal – first place	2010 Saint Petersburg	Junior Team sprint
Gold medal – first place	2011 Anadia	Junior Sprint
Gold medal – first place	2011 Anadia	Junior 500m time trial
Gold medal – first place	2011 Anadia	Junior Keirin
Gold medal – first place	2011 Anadia	Junior Team sprint
Gold medal – first place	2012 Anadia	U23 500m time trial
Gold medal – first place	2012 Anadia	U23 Team sprint
Gold medal – first place	2013 Anadia	U23 Sprint
Gold medal – first place	2014 Anadia	U23 Sprint
Gold medal – first place	2014 Anadia	U23 500m time trial
Gold medal – first place	2014 Anadia	U23 Team sprint
Gold medal – first place	2015 Athens	U23 Sprint
Gold medal – first place	2015 Anadia	U23 500m time trial
Gold medal – first place	2015 Anadia	U23 Team sprint
Silver medal – second place	2010 Saint Petersburg	Junior 500m time trial
Silver medal – second place	2013 Anadia	U23 Team sprint
Bronze medal – third place	2010 Saint Petersburg	U23 Team sprint

Anastasia Sergeyevna Voynova (Russian: Анастасия Сергеевна Войнова, IPA: [ɐnəstɐˈsʲijə ˈvojnəvə]; born 5 February 1993) is a Russian professional track cyclist. She won the bronze medal in the 500 m time trial event at the 2014 UCI Track Cycling World Championships. At the 2015 UCI Track Cycling World Championships, she won a silver medal in the team sprint and a gold in the 500 m time trial. At the 2015 UEC European Track Championships, Voinova broke the 500 m time trial world record in 32.794 seconds.

== Major results ==
2010
3rd Team Sprint, UEC European U23 Track Championships (with Victoria Baranova)
2012
UEC European U23 Track Championships

1st Team Sprint (with Victoria Baranova)
1st 500m Time Trial

2013
UEC European U23 Track Championships

1st Sprint
2nd Team Sprint (with Ekaterina Gnidenko)

Grand Prix of Russian Helicopters

2nd Sprint
2nd Team Sprint (with Daria Shmeleva)

2014
UEC European Track Championships

1st Sprint
1st Team Sprint (with Elena Brejniva and Daria Shmeleva)
1st 500m Time Trial

Grand Prix of Tula

1st Team Sprint (with Ekaterina Gnidenko)
1st 500m Time Trial
2nd Sprint

Memorial of Alexander Lesnikov

1st Team Sprint (with Daria Shmeleva)
2nd Sprint
500m Time Trial

1st Sprint, Cottbuser SprintCup
1st Team Sprint GP von Deutschland im Sprint (with Daria Shmeleva)
UEC European U23 Track Championships

1st Sprint
1st Team Sprint (with Daria Shmeleva)
1st 500m Time Trial

2015
UEC European Track Championships

1st Team Sprint (with Daria Shmeleva)
1st 500m Time Trial
2nd Sprint

Grand Prix of Tula

1st Keirin
1st Sprint
1st Team Sprint (with Daria Shmeleva)

Memorial of Alexander Lesnikov

1st Keirin
1st Sprint
1st Team Sprint (with Daria Shmeleva)

Cottbuser SprintCup

1st 500m Time Trial
3rd Sprint

UEC European U23 Track Championships

1st Sprint
1st Team Sprint (with Daria Shmeleva)
1st 500m Time Trial

GP von Deutschland im Sprint

2nd Sprint
2nd Team Sprint (with Daria Shmeleva)

2016
UCI World Track Championships

1st Team Sprint (with Daria Shmeleva)
1st 500m Time Trial

Memorial of Alexander Lesnikov

1st Team Sprint (with Daria Shmeleva)
2nd Sprint

Grand Prix of Tula

1st Team Sprint (with Daria Shmeleva)
2nd Keirin
3rd Sprint

Grand Prix Minsk

1st 500m Time Trial
2nd Sprint
3rd Keirin

Panevežys

2nd Keirin
3rd Sprint

2017
UCI World Track Championships

1st Team Sprint (with Daria Shmeleva)
3rd 500m Time Trial

1st UEC European Track Championships (with Daria Shmeleva)
1st Sprint, Grand Prix of Moscow
2nd Sprint, GP von Deutschland im Sprint
