= Sára Kaňkovská =

Czech cyclist

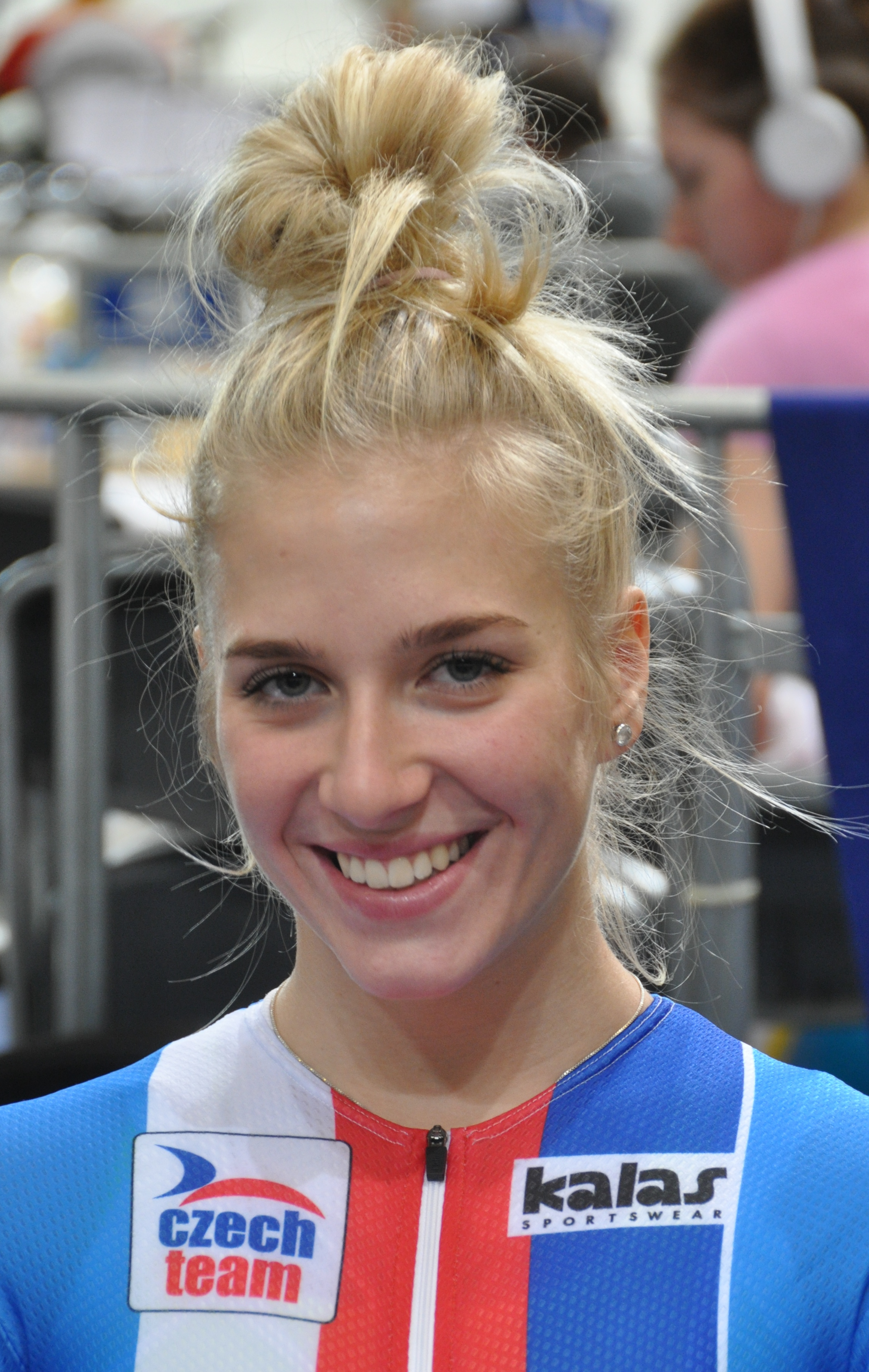
- Sára Kaňkovská in 2016

Personal information
- Born: 22 June 1998 (age 28)

Cycling career
- Sport: Cycling
- Role: Rider
Medal record
Women's track cycling
Representing Czech Republic
European Championships
Silver medal – second place	2020 Plovdiv	Keirin

Sára Kaňkovská (born 22 June 1998) is a Czech professional racing cyclist. She rode in the women's 500 m time trial event at the 2019 UEC European Track Championships.

== Sports career ==
Sára Kaňkovská comes from a cycling family: her father, Martin Kaňkovský, was also an active cyclist – in 1994 he finished third in the Czech Road Championship – and works as a mechanic at Dukla Brno, whose athletes train at the velodrome in Brno . Her twin sister, Ema, is also a successful cyclist. Her father initially tried to prevent his daughters from becoming racing cyclists, believing the sport to be too demanding, but changed his mind after their successes. At the age of 14, Kaňkovská suffered a serious fall during training and fractured her tibia and skull.
