= Olena Starikova =

Ukrainian cyclist (born 1996)

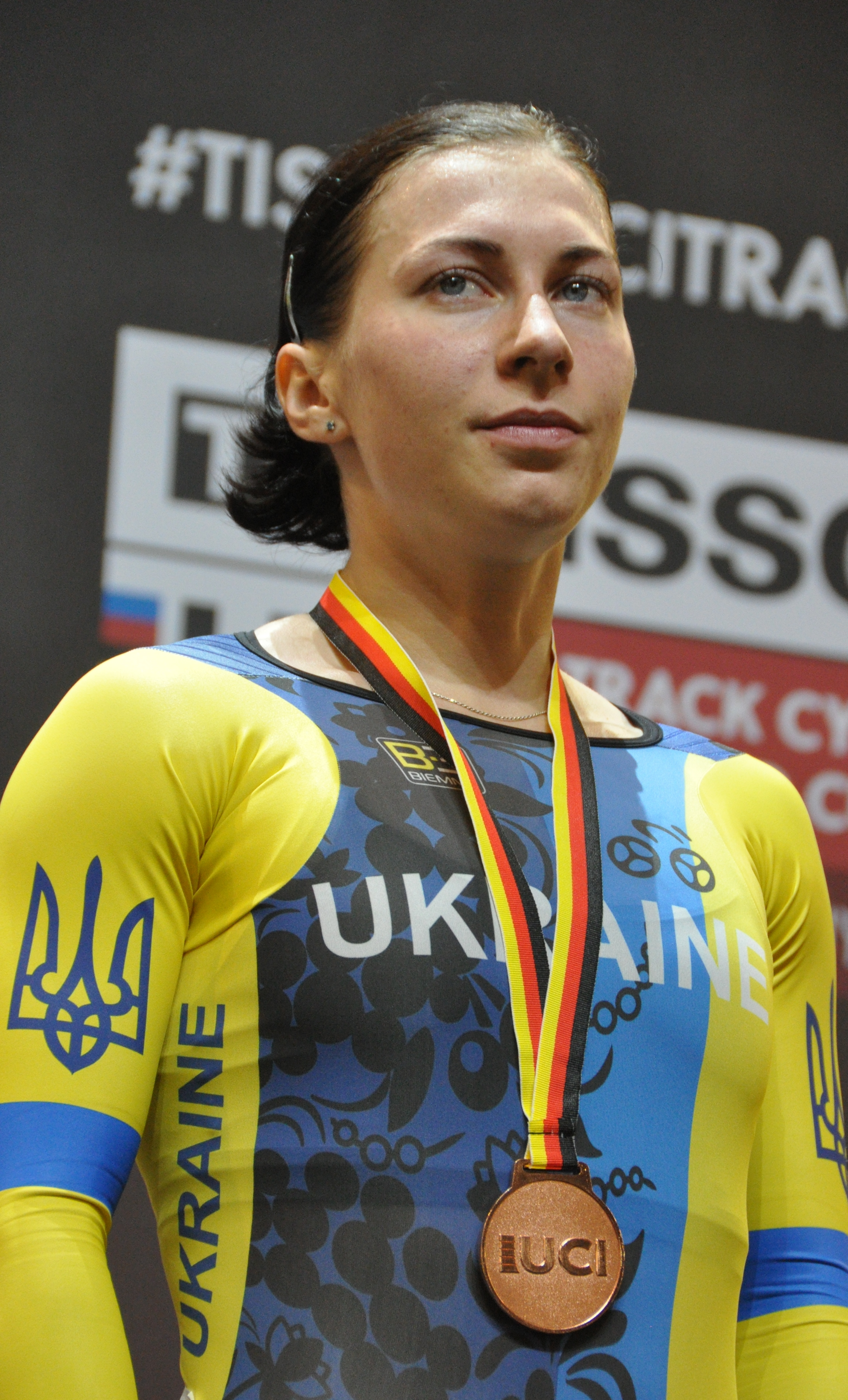
- Starikova in 2019

Personal information
- Born: 22 April 1996 (age 30) Kharkiv, Ukraine

Cycling career
- Sport: Cycling
- Discipline: Track cycling
- Role: Rider
Medal record
Women's track cycling
Representing Ukraine
Olympic Games
Silver medal – second place	2020 Tokyo	Sprint
World Championships
Silver medal – second place	2019 Pruszków	500 m time trial
European Games
Silver medal – second place	2019 Minsk	500 m time trial
European Championships
Gold medal – first place	2020 Plovdiv	Keirin
Silver medal – second place	2018 Glasgow	500m time trial
Silver medal – second place	2018 Glasgow	Team sprint
Silver medal – second place	2019 Apeldoorn	Sprint
Silver medal – second place	2021 Grenchen	Keirin
Silver medal – second place	2022 Munich	500 m time trial
Bronze medal – third place	2019 Apeldoorn	500m time trial
Bronze medal – third place	2020 Plovdiv	Sprint
Bronze medal – third place	2020 Plovdiv	Team sprint
Bronze medal – third place	2022 Munich	Keirin
U23 & Junior European Championships
Gold medal – first place	2017 Sangalhos	U23 Sprint
Silver medal – second place	2017 Sangalhos	U23 500m time trial
Bronze medal – third place	2014 Anadia	Junior 500m time trial

Olena Viktorivna Starikova (Ukrainian: Олена Вікторівна Старікова; born 22 April 1996) is a Ukrainian track cyclist. She represented her nation at the 2014 and 2015 UCI Track Cycling World Championships.

== Career results ==
2014
Grand Prix Galichyna

1st Keirin
1st Team Sprint (with Olena Tsyos)
2nd Sprint
2nd 500m Time Trial

3rd Sprint, Grand Prix of Poland (U23)
2015
Grand Prix Galichyna

1st 500m Time Trial
2nd Sprint
3rd Keirin

2nd Team Sprint, Grand Prix of Poland (with Lyubov Basova)
3rd Team Sprint, Grand Prix Minsk (with Lyubov Basova)
3rd Team Sprint, Memorial of Alexander Lesnikov (with Lyubov Basova)
2016
Grand Prix Galichyna

1st Keirin
1st Sprint
1st 500m Time Trial

3rd Sprint, Prilba Moravy
2021

4th Keirin, Olympic Games
2nd Sprint
