= Lyubov Basova =

Ukrainian cyclist (born 1988)

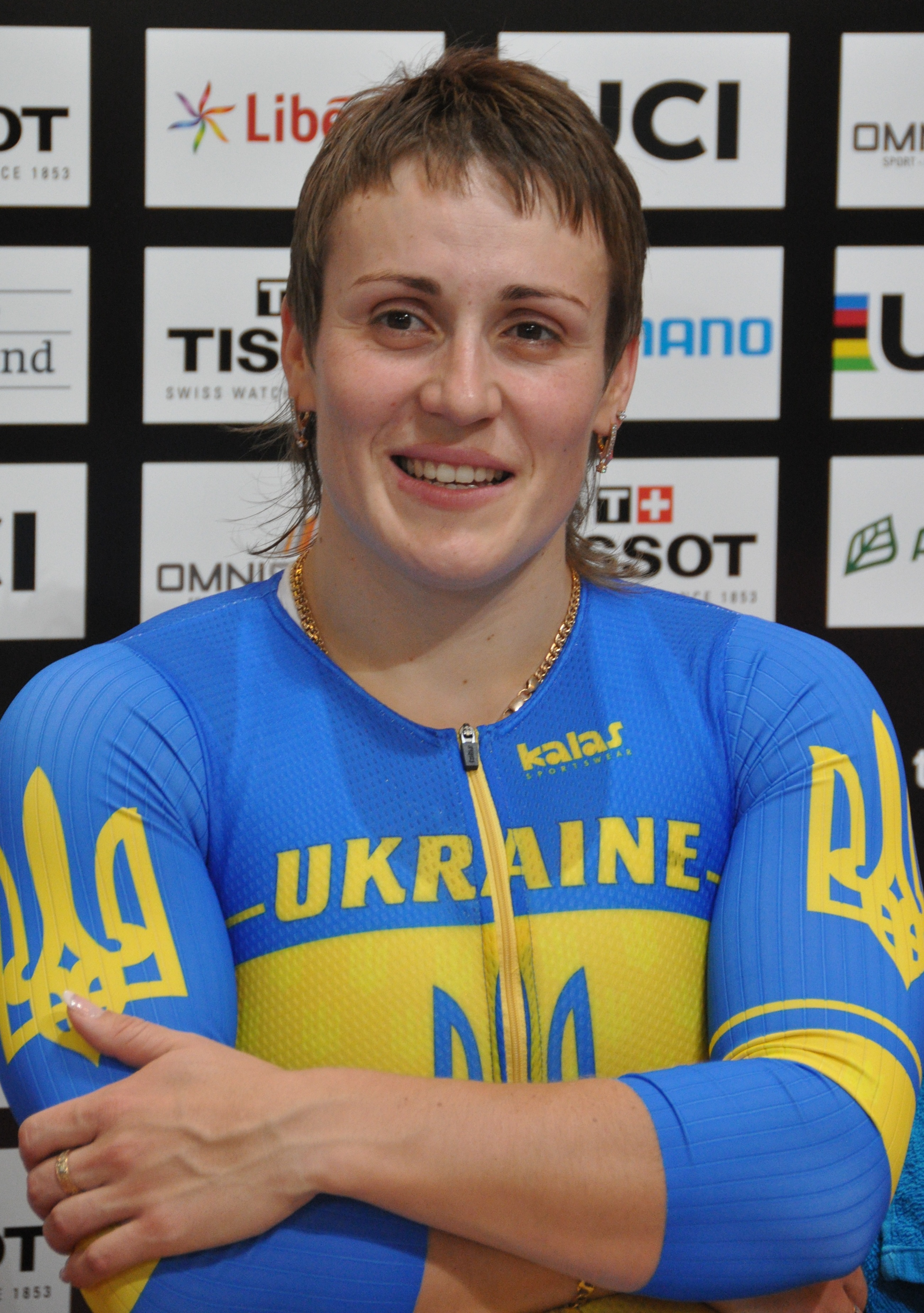
- Lyubov Shulika (2016)

Personal information
- Born: 16 July 1988 (age 38) Sharapanivka, Ukrainian SSR, Soviet Union

Cycling career
- Sport: Cycling
- Role: Rider
Medal record
Women's track cycling
Representing Ukraine
World Championships
Silver medal – second place	2008 Manchester	Team pursuit
European Championships
Gold medal – first place	2011 Apeldoorn	Sprint
Gold medal – first place	2016 Yvelines	Keirin
Silver medal – second place	2011 Apeldoorn	Team sprint
Silver medal – second place	2018 Glasgow	Team sprint
Bronze medal – third place	2010 Pruszków	Keirin
Bronze medal – third place	2017 Berlin	Keirin
Bronze medal – third place	2020 Plovdiv	Team sprint
Junior World Championships
Gold medal – first place	2006 Ghent	Sprint
Silver medal – second place	2005 Vienna	500m time trial
Silver medal – second place	2006 Ghent	500m time trial
U23 & Junior European Championships
Gold medal – first place	2005 Fiorenzuola	Junior Sprint
Gold medal – first place	2005 Fiorenzuola	Junior 500m time trial
Gold medal – first place	2006 Athens	Junior Sprint
Gold medal – first place	2006 Athens	Junior 500m time trial
Gold medal – first place	2006 Athens	Junior Keirin
Gold medal – first place	2007 Cottbus	U23 Sprint
Silver medal – second place	2005 Fiorenzuola	Junior Keirin
Bronze medal – third place	2007 Cottbus	U23 Keirin
Bronze medal – third place	2008 Pruszków	U23 Keirin

Lyubov Valeriyivna Basova, née Shulika (Ukrainian: Любов Валеріївна Басова (Шуліка); born 16 July 1988), is a Ukrainian track cyclist.

At the 2012 Summer Olympics, she competed in the Women's team sprint for the national team, along with the individual sprint and the keirin. At the 2016 Olympics, she was the only Ukrainian track cyclist, qualifying for the women's keirin.

== Career results ==
2008
UEC European U23 Track Championships

2nd Sprint
3rd Keirin

2009
UEC European U23 Track Championships

1st Keirin
1st Sprint

2015
Grand Prix Galichyna

1st Sprint
1st Keirin
2nd 500m Time Trial

Grand Prix of Poland

2nd Team Sprint (with Olena Starikova
3rd Sprint

Grand Prix Minsk

3rd Sprint
3rd Team Sprint, (with Olena Starikova)

3rd Team Sprint, Memorial of Alexander Lesnikov (with Olena Starikova)
Prova Internacional de Anadia

3rd Keirin
3rd Sprint

2017
Grand Prix Galichyna

1st Keirin
1st Sprint
1st 500m Time Trial

3rd Keirin, UEC European Track Championships
2021
6th Keirin, Olympic Games
