= Elena Bissolati =

Italian cyclist (born 1997)

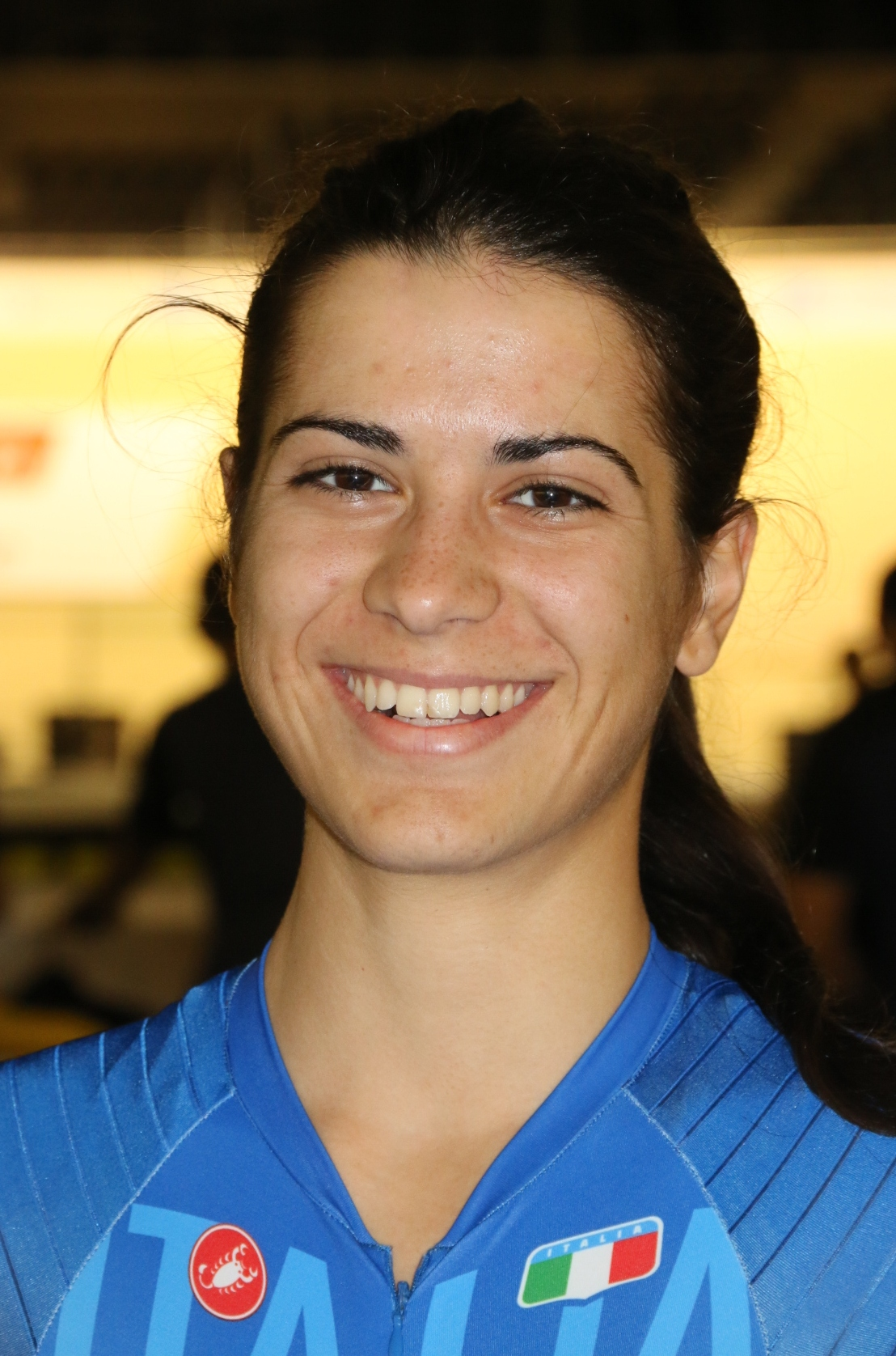
- Bissolati in 2017

Personal information
- Born: 10 January 1997 (age 29) Cremona, Italy

Cycling career
- Sport: Cycling
- Role: Rider

Elena Bissolati (born 10 January 1997) is an Italian professional racing cyclist who rides for Biesse–Carrera, formerly for Bepink.

== Major results ==
2017
GP von Deutschland im Sprint

2nd Team Sprint (with Miriam Vece
3rd Keirin

== See also ==
- List of 2016 UCI Women's Teams and riders
