= Miriam Vece =

Italian racing cyclist

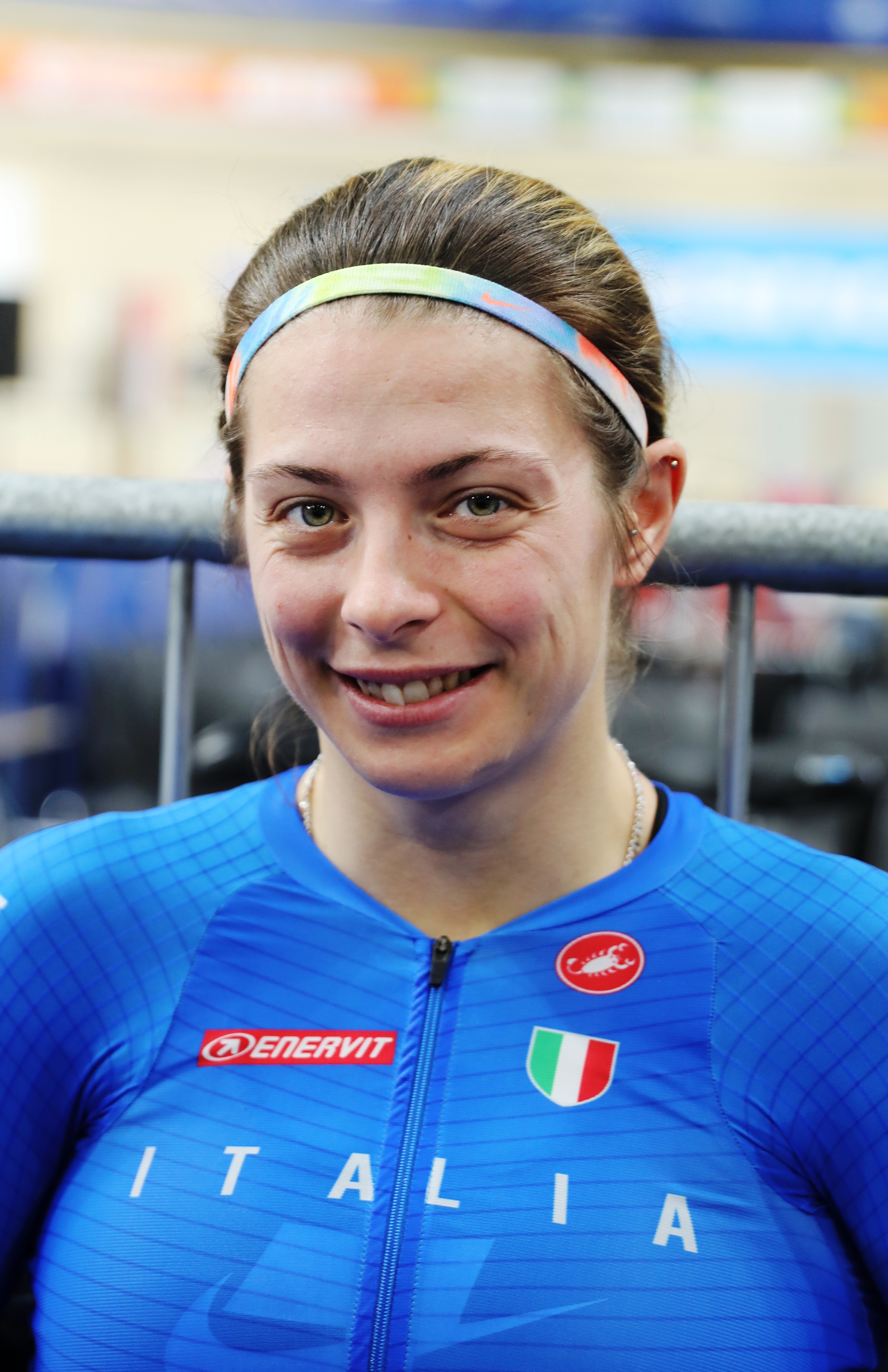
- Vece in 2024

Personal information
- Born: 16 March 1997 (age 29) Crema, Lombardy, Italy

Cycling career
- Sport: Cycling
- Disciplines: Road; Track
- Role: Rider

Professional team
- 2017–2022: Valcar–PBM
Medal record
Women's track cycling
Representing Italy
World Championships
Bronze medal – third place	2020 Berlin	500 m time trial
European Games
Bronze medal – third place	2019 Minsk	500 m time trial
European Championships
Silver medal – second place	2026 Konya	1 km time trial
Bronze medal – third place	2020 Plovdiv	500 m time trial
Bronze medal – third place	2022 Munich	500 m time trial

Miriam Vece (born 16 March 1997) is an Italian road and track cyclist, who most recently rode for UCI Women's Continental Team Valcar–Travel & Service. Representing Italy at international competitions, Vece competed at the 2016 UEC European Track Championships in the 500m time trial and team sprint events.

== Major results ==
2015
2nd Team sprint, UEC European Junior Track Championships
3rd Team sprint, UCI Juniors Track World Championships
2016
Athens Track Grand Prix

1st 500m time trial
3rd Sprint
3rd Keirin

2017
1st 500m time trial, Cottbuser SprintCup
2nd Team sprint, GP von Deutschland im Sprint (with Elena Bissolati)
2018
UEC European Under-23 Track Championships

1st 500m time trial
1st Sprint
2nd Team sprint
