= Miglė Lendel =

Lithuanian cyclist (born 1996)

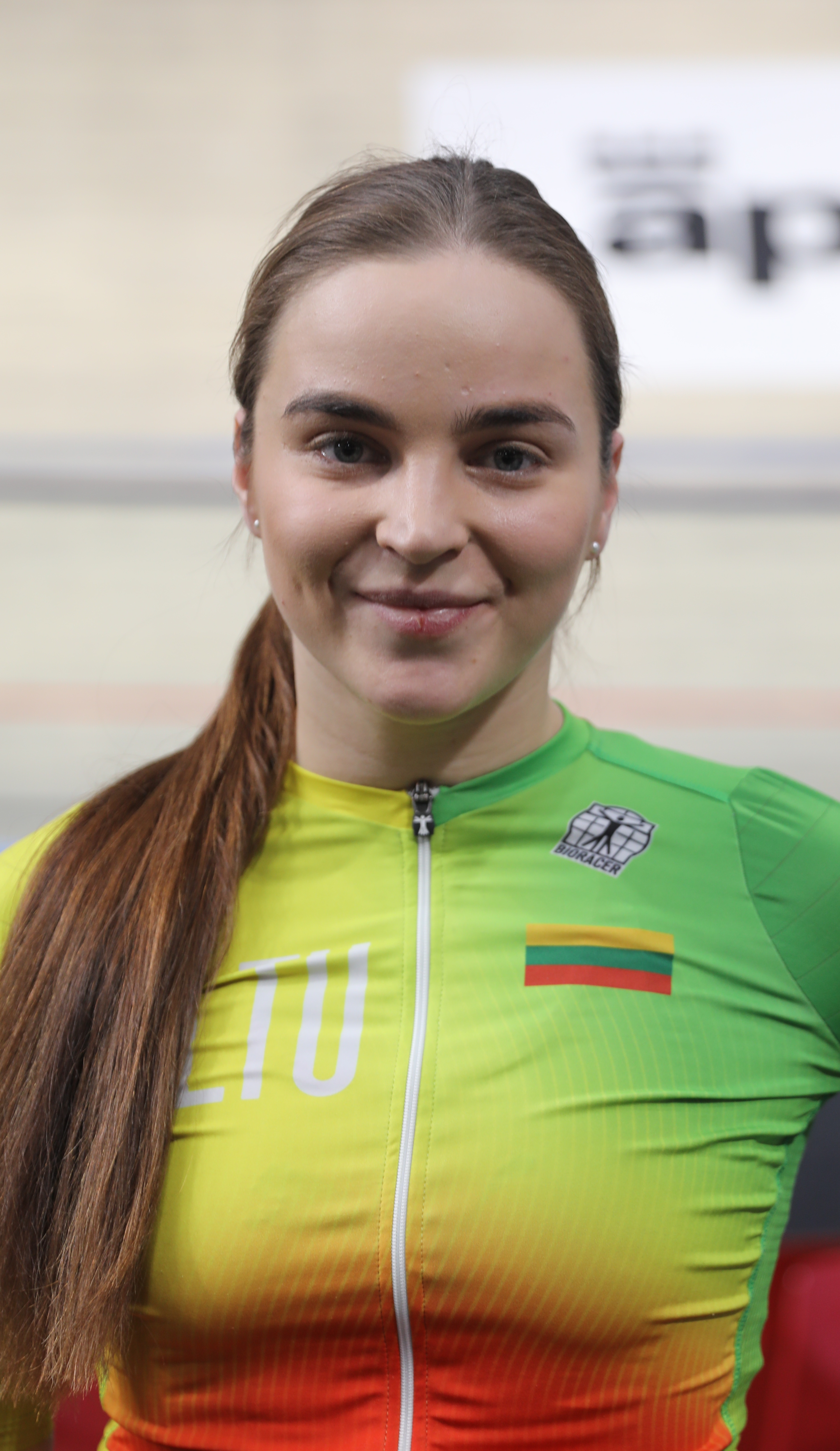
- Miglė Marozaitė in 2024

Personal information
- Full name: Miglė Marozaitė
- Born: 10 March 1996 (age 30)

Cycling career
- Sport: Cycling
- Discipline: Track
- Role: Rider
- Rider type: Sprinter
Medal record
Representing Lithuania
Women's track cycling
European Championships
Bronze medal – third place	2016 Yvelines	Team sprint
European Games
Silver medal – second place	2019 Minsk	Team sprint

Miglė Lendel, née Marozaitė (born 10 March 1996) is a Lithuanian professional track cyclist.

In 2016, she won bronze at 2016 UEC European Track Championships in team sprint together with Simona Krupeckaitė.

== Major results ==
2014
2nd Team Sprint, Polish Cup (with Gintarė Gaivenytė)
2015
1st Team Sprint, Grand Prix of Poland (with Simona Krupeckaitė)
1st Sprint, International Belgian Open
2nd 500m Time Trial, Cottbuser SprintCup
2016
3rd Team Sprint, UEC European Track Championships
3rd Keirin, UEC European U23 Track Championships

2017
Grand Prix of Tula

1st Sprint
2nd Keirin

2nd 500m Time Trial, Grand Prix of Moscow
3rd Sprint, Grand Prix Minsk
3rd Sprint, International track race - Panevežys
