= Helena Casas =

Spanish cyclist

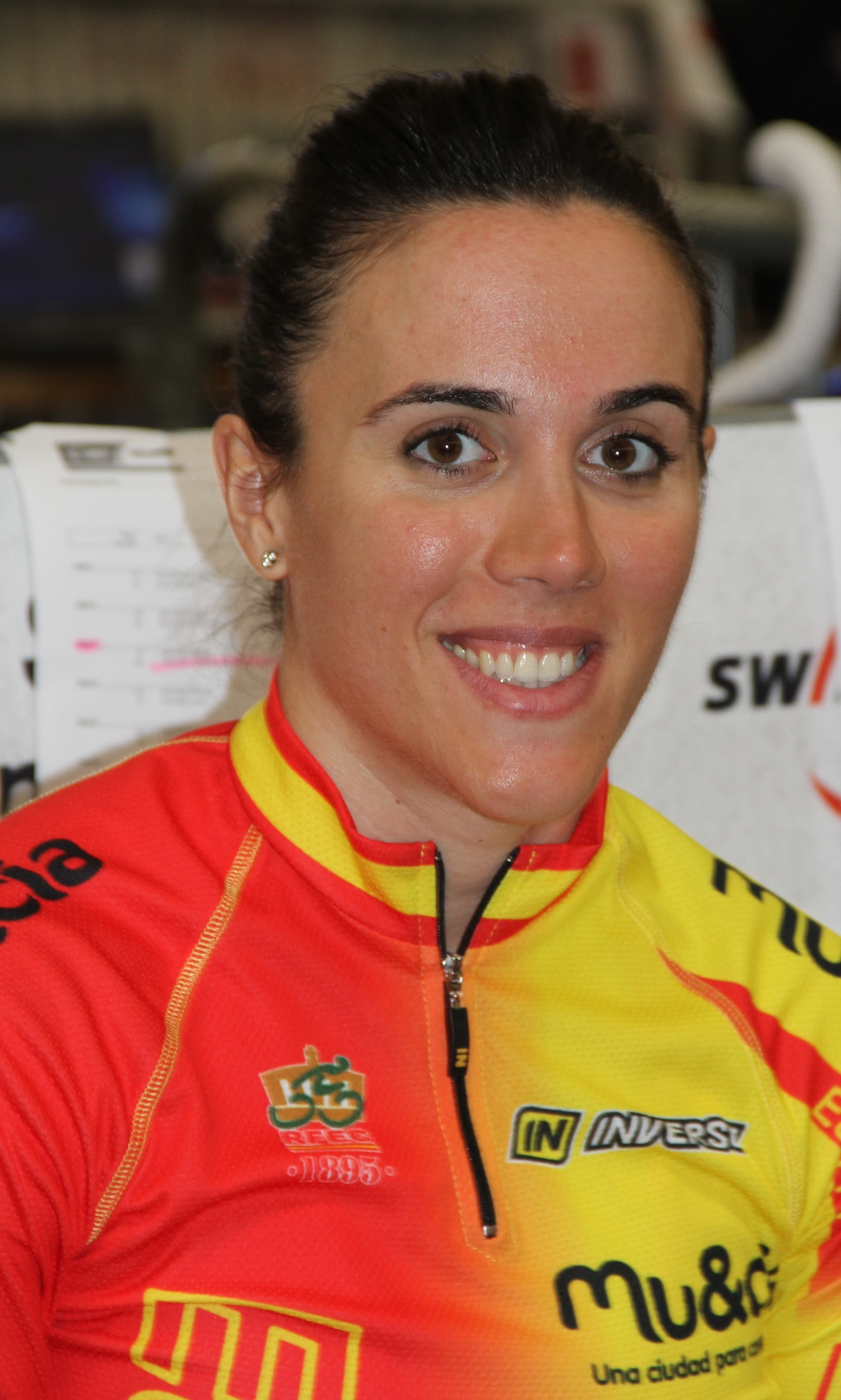
- Casas at the 2015 UEC European Track Championships

Personal information
- Full name: Helena Casas Roigé
- Born: 24 July 1988 (age 38) Vilaseca, Spain

Cycling career
- Sport: Cycling
- Discipline: Track cycling
Medal record
Women's track cycling
Representing Spain
European Championships
Silver medal – second place	2016 Yvelines	Team sprint
Bronze medal – third place	2020 Plovdiv	Keirin

Helena Casas Roigé (born 24 July 1988) is a track cyclist from Catalonia. She represented Spain at the 2007, 2009, 2012, 2013, 2014 and 2015 UCI Track Cycling World Championships.

Casas competed for the Spanish track cycling team at the 2016 Summer Olympics. There, she finished seventh, alongside her partner Tania Calvo, in the women's team sprint, and rode a flying lap of 11.707 seconds in the qualifying round of the individual sprint race, which left her in the penultimate position against a field of 26 other competitors.

== Career results ==
2008
Grand Prix International Ville de Barcelone

1st Keirin
1st 500m Time Trial

2013
Copa Internacional de Pista

1st Team Sprint (with Tania Calvo)
2nd Keirin
2nd Sprint

2014
International Track Women & Men

1st Keirin
2nd Sprint

Trofeu Ciutat de Barcelona

1st Keirin
1st Sprint

Prova Internacional de Anadia

2nd Keirin
2nd Sprint

2015
2nd Keirin, Irish International Track GP
Trofeu Ciutat de Barcelona

2nd Keirin
2nd Sprint

Prova Internacional de Anadia

2nd Keirin
2nd Sprint

2016
Prova Internacional de Anadia

1st Keirin
1st Sprint

Fenioux France Trophy

1st Sprint
2nd Keirin

Trofeu Ciutat de Barcelona

2nd Keirin
2nd Sprint

3rd Keirin, Trofeu CAR Anadia Portugal
2017
TROFEU CIUTAT DE BARCELONA-Memorial Miquel Poblet

1st Keirin
2nd Sprint

3rd Keirin, Belgian International Track Meeting
