= 2022 UCI Track Cycling World Championships – Women's sprint =

Women's sprint at the 2022 UCI Track Cycling World Championships
- Venue: Vélodrome National
- Location: Saint-Quentin-en-Yvelines, France
- Dates: 13–14 October
- Competitors: 34 from 23 nations

Medalists
gold medal	Mathilde Gros	France
silver medal	Lea Friedrich	Germany
bronze medal	Emma Hinze	Germany

The Women's sprint competition at the 2022 UCI Track Cycling World Championships was held on 13 and 14 October 2022.

== Results ==
=== Qualifying ===
The qualifying was started on 13 October at 14:00. The top four riders advanced directly to the 1/8 finals; places 5 to 28 advanced to the 1/16 final.

Rank	Name	Nation	Time	Behind	Notes
1	Lea Friedrich	Germany	10.357		Q
2	Mathilde Gros	France	10.401	+0.044	Q
3	Hetty van de Wouw	Netherlands	10.416	+0.059	Q
4	Martha Bayona	Colombia	10.483	+0.126	Q
5	Pauline Grabosch	Germany	10.489	+0.132	Q
6	Emma Hinze	Germany	10.491	+0.134	Q
7	Sophie Capewell	Great Britain	10.492	+0.135	Q
8	Lauriane Genest	Canada	10.559	+0.202	Q
9	Ellesse Andrews	New Zealand	10.574	+0.217	Q
10	Olena Starikova	Ukraine	10.596	+0.239	Q
11	Taky Marie-Divine Kouamé	France	10.599	+0.242	Q
12	Kelsey Mitchell	Canada	10.607	+0.250	Q
13	Laurine van Riessen	Netherlands	10.636	+0.279	Q
14	Kristina Clonan	Australia	10.677	+0.320	Q
15	Yuan Liying	China	10.697	+0.340	Q
16	Riyu Ohta	Japan	10.734	+0.377	Q
17	Sarah Orban	Canada	10.820	+0.463	Q
18	Mina Sato	Japan	10.849	+0.492	Q
19	Daniela Gaxiola	Mexico	10.854	+0.497	Q
20	Fuko Umekawa	Japan	10.912	+0.555	Q
21	Nikola Sibiak	Poland	10.926	+0.569	Q
22	Veronika Jaborníková	Czech Republic	10.940	+0.583	Q
23	Nicky Degrendele	Belgium	10.975	+0.618	Q
24	Miriam Vece	Italy	11.010	+0.653	Q
25	Yuli Verdugo	Mexico	11.065	+0.708	Q
26	Orla Walsh	Ireland	11.079	+0.722	Q
27	Paulina Petri	Poland	11.089	+0.732	Q
28	Anis Amira Rosidi	Malaysia	11.149	+0.792	Q
29	Helena Casas	Spain	11.153	+0.796	
30	Nicole Hacohen	Guatemala	11.226	+0.869	
31	Yeung Cho Yiu	Hong Kong	11.345	+0.988	
32	Kayla Hankins	United States	11.385	+1.028	
33	McKenna McKee	United States	11.564	+1.207	
34	Tombrapa Grikpa	Nigeria	12.969	+2.612	

=== 1/16 finals ===
The 1/16 finals were started on 13 October at 15:29.

Heat	Rank	Name	Nation	Gap	Notes
1	1	Pauline Grabosch	Germany		Q
1	2	Anis Amira Rosidi	Malaysia	+0.366	
2	1	Emma Hinze	Germany		Q
2	2	Paulina Petri	Poland	+0.145	
3	1	Sophie Capewell	Great Britain		Q
3	2	Orla Walsh	Ireland	+0.126	
4	1	Lauriane Genest	Canada		Q
4	2	Yuli Verdugo	Mexico	+0.191	
5	1	Ellesse Andrews	New Zealand		Q
5	2	Miriam Vece	Italy	+0.301	
6	1	Olena Starikova	Ukraine		Q
6	2	Nicky Degrendele	Belgium	+0.245	
7	1	Taky Marie-Divine Kouamé	France		Q
7	2	Veronika Jaborníková	Czech Republic	+0.827	
8	1	Kelsey Mitchell	Canada		Q
8	2	Nikola Sibiak	Poland	+0.421	
9	1	Laurine van Riessen	Netherlands		Q
9	2	Fuko Umekawa	Japan	+0.075	
10	1	Kristina Clonan	Australia		Q
10	2	Daniela Gaxiola	Mexico	+0.141	
11	1	Mina Sato	Japan		Q
11	2	Yuan Liying	China	+0.137	
12	1	Riyu Ohta	Japan		Q
12	2	Sarah Orban	Canada	+0.036	

=== 1/8 finals ===
The 1/8 finals were started on 13 October at 16:21.

Heat	Rank	Name	Nation	Gap	Notes
1	1	Lea Friedrich	Germany		Q
1	2	Riyu Ohta	Japan	+0.545	
2	1	Mathilde Gros	France		Q
2	2	Mina Sato	Japan	+0.064	
3	1	Hetty van de Wouw	Netherlands		Q
3	2	Kristina Clonan	Australia	+0.062	
4	1	Laurine van Riessen	Netherlands		Q
4	2	Martha Bayona	Colombia	+0.121	
5	1	Pauline Grabosch	Germany		Q
5	2	Kelsey Mitchell	Canada	+0.096	
6	1	Emma Hinze	Germany		Q
6	2	Taky Marie-Divine Kouamé	France	+0.321	
7	1	Sophie Capewell	Great Britain		Q
7	2	Olena Starikova	Ukraine	+0.043	
8	1	Ellesse Andrews	New Zealand		Q
8	2	Lauriane Genest	Canada	+0.084	

=== Quarterfinals ===
The quarterfinals were started on 13 October at 18:30.

Heat	Rank	Name	Nation	Race 1	Race 2	Decider (i.r.)	Notes
1	1	Lea Friedrich	Germany	X	X		Q
1	2	Ellesse Andrews	New Zealand	+0.197	+0.086		
2	1	Mathilde Gros	France	X	X		Q
2	2	Sophie Capewell	Great Britain	+0.150	+0.216		
3	1	Emma Hinze	Germany	X	X		Q
3	2	Hetty van de Wouw	Netherlands	+0.076	+0.009		
4	1	Laurine van Riessen	Netherlands	X	X		Q
4	2	Pauline Grabosch	Germany	+0.074	+0.036		

=== Semifinals ===
The semifinals were started on 14 October at 19:24.

Heat	Rank	Name	Nation	Race 1	Race 2	Decider (i.r.)	Notes
1	1	Lea Friedrich	Germany	X	X		Q
1	2	Laurine van Riessen	Netherlands	+0.000	+0.087		
2	1	Mathilde Gros	France	+0.026	X	X	Q
2	2	Emma Hinze	Germany	X	+0.072	+0.247	

=== Finals ===
The Finals were started on 14 October at 20:51.

Rank	Name	Nation	Race 1	Race 2	Decider (i.r.)
Gold medal race
1st place, gold medalist(s)	Mathilde Gros	France	X	X	
2nd place, silver medalist(s)	Lea Friedrich	Germany	+0.030	+0.059	
Bronze medal race
3rd place, bronze medalist(s)	Emma Hinze	Germany	X	X	
4	Laurine van Riessen	Netherlands	+0.030	+0.058	
