= 2020 UCI Track Cycling World Championships – Women's sprint =

Women's sprint at the 2020 UCI Track Cycling World Championships
- Venue: Velodrom
- Location: Berlin, Germany
- Dates: 27–28 February
- Competitors: 33 from 19 nations

Medalists
gold medal	Emma Hinze	Germany
silver medal	Anastasia Voynova	Russia
bronze medal	Lee Wai Sze	Hong Kong

The Women's sprint competition at the 2020 UCI Track Cycling World Championships was held on 27 and 28 February 2020.

== Results ==
=== Qualifying ===
The qualifying was started on 27 February at 14:53. The top four riders advanced directly to the 1/8 finals; places 5 to 28 advanced to the 1/16 finals.

Rank	Name	Nation	Time	Behind	Notes
1	Emma Hinze	Germany	10.364		Q
2	Lea Friedrich	Germany	10.461	+0.097	Q
3	Shanne Braspennincx	Netherlands	10.478	+0.114	Q
4	Lee Wai Sze	Hong Kong	10.478	+0.114	Q
5	Stephanie Morton	Australia	10.483	+0.119	q
6	Lauriane Genest	Canada	10.487	+0.123	q
7	Kelsey Mitchell	Canada	10.504	+0.140	q
8	Laurine van Riessen	Netherlands	10.513	+0.149	q
9	Mathilde Gros	France	10.533	+0.169	q
10	Katy Marchant	Great Britain	10.559	+0.195	q
11	Miriam Vece	Italy	10.580	+0.216	q
12	Daniela Gaxiola	Mexico	10.583	+0.219	q
13	Zhong Tianshi	China	10.588	+0.224	q
14	Anastasia Voynova	Russia	10.622	+0.258	q
15	Sophie Capewell	Great Britain	10.625	+0.261	q
16	Olena Starikova	Ukraine	10.634	+0.270	q
17	Natasha Hansen	New Zealand	10.638	+0.274	q
18	Yuka Kobayashi	Japan	10.712	+0.348	q
19	Kaarle McCulloch	Australia	10.744	+0.380	q
20	Olivia Podmore	New Zealand	10.748	+0.384	q
21	Jessica Salazar	Mexico	10.754	+0.390	q
22	Simona Krupeckaitė	Lithuania	10.776	+0.412	q
23	Daria Shmeleva	Russia	10.802	+0.438	q
24	Martha Bayona	Colombia	10.806	+0.442	q
25	Madalyn Godby	United States	10.855	+0.491	q
26	Riyu Ohta	Japan	10.901	+0.537	q
27	Sarah Orban	Canada	10.921	+0.557	q
28	Miglė Marozaitė	Lithuania	10.925	+0.561	q
29	Mandy Marquardt	United States	10.939	+0.575	
30	Tania Calvo	Spain	10.959	+0.595	
31	Jessica Lee Hoi Yan	Hong Kong	11.047	+0.683	
32	Ekaterina Rogovaya	Russia	11.056	+0.692	
33	Charlene du Preez	South Africa	11.105	+0.741	

=== 1/16 finals ===
The 1/16 finals were started on 27 February at 15:58. Heat winners advanced to the 1/8 finals.

Heat	Rank	Name	Nation	Gap	Notes
1	1	Stephanie Morton	Australia		Q
1	2	Miglė Marozaitė	Lithuania	+0.136	
2	1	Lauriane Genest	Canada		Q
2	2	Sarah Orban	Canada	+0.284	
3	1	Kelsey Mitchell	Canada		Q
3	2	Riyu Ohta	Japan	+0.098	
4	1	Laurine van Riessen	Netherlands		Q
4	2	Madalyn Godby	United States	+0.243	
5	1	Mathilde Gros	France		Q
5	2	Martha Bayona	Colombia	+0.101	
6	1	Katy Marchant	Great Britain		Q
6	2	Daria Shmeleva	Russia	+0.228	
7	1	Simona Krupeckaitė	Lithuania		Q
7	2	Miriam Vece	Italy	+0.016	
8	1	Daniela Gaxiola	Mexico		Q
8	2	Jessica Salazar	Mexico	+0.034	
9	1	Zhong Tianshi	China		Q
9	2	Olivia Podmore	New Zealand	+0.029	
10	1	Anastasia Voynova	Russia		Q
10	2	Kaarle McCulloch	Australia	+0.307	
11	1	Yuka Kobayashi	Japan		Q
11	2	Sophie Capewell	Great Britain	+0.035	
12	1	Olena Starikova	Ukraine		Q
12	2	Natasha Hansen	New Zealand	+0.058	

=== 1/8 finals ===
The 1/8 finals were started on 27 February at 16:50. Heat winners advanced to the quarterfinals.

Heat	Rank	Name	Nation	Gap	Notes
1	1	Emma Hinze	Germany		Q
1	2	Olena Starikova	Ukraine	+0.132	
2	1	Lea Friedrich	Germany		Q
2	2	Yuka Kobayashi	Japan	+0.387	
3	1	Anastasia Voynova	Russia		Q
3	2	Shanne Braspennincx	Netherlands	+0.029	
4	1	Lee Wai Sze	Hong Kong		Q
4	2	Zhong Tianshi	China	+0.125	
5	1	Daniela Gaxiola	Mexico		Q
5	2	Stephanie Morton	Australia	+0.004	
6	1	Simona Krupeckaitė	Lithuania		Q
6	2	Lauriane Genest	Canada	+0.041	
7	1	Kelsey Mitchell	Canada		Q
7	2	Katy Marchant	Great Britain	+0.037	
8	1	Laurine van Riessen	Netherlands		Q
8	2	Mathilde Gros	France	+0.049	

=== Quarterfinals ===
The quarterfinals were started 27 February at 18:58. Matches were extended to a best-of-three format hereon; winners proceeded to the semifinals.

Heat	Rank	Name	Nation	Race 1	Race 2	Decider (i.r.)	Notes
1	1	Emma Hinze	Germany	X	X		Q
1	2	Laurine van Riessen	Netherlands	+0.016	+0.141		
2	1	Kelsey Mitchell	Canada	X	X		Q
2	2	Lea Friedrich	Germany	+0.007	+0.010		
3	1	Anastasia Voynova	Russia	X	X		Q
3	2	Simona Krupeckaitė	Lithuania	+0.120	+0.139		
4	1	Lee Wai Sze	Hong Kong	X	X		Q
4	2	Daniela Gaxiola	Mexico	+0.062	+0.246		

=== Semifinals ===
The semifinals were started on 28 February at 19:24.

Heat	Rank	Name	Nation	Race 1	Race 2	Decider (i.r.)	Notes
1	1	Emma Hinze	Germany	X	X		Q
1	2	Lee Wai Sze	Hong Kong	+0.108	+0.139		
2	1	Anastasia Voynova	Russia	X	+0.046	X	Q
2	2	Kelsey Mitchell	Canada	+0.064	X	+0.066	

=== Finals ===
The finals were started on 28 February at 20:51.

Rank	Name	Nation	Race 1	Race 2	Decider (i.r.)
Gold medal race
1st place, gold medalist(s)	Emma Hinze	Germany	X	X	
2nd place, silver medalist(s)	Anastasia Voynova	Russia	+0.187	+0.138	
Bronze medal race
3rd place, bronze medalist(s)	Lee Wai Sze	Hong Kong	X	X	
4	Kelsey Mitchell	Canada	+0.113	+0.107	
