= 2021 UCI Track Cycling World Championships – Women's keirin =

Women Track Cycling World Championship 24 October 2021

Women's keirin at the 2021 UCI Track Cycling World Championships
- Venue: Vélodrome Couvert Régional Jean Stablinski
- Location: Roubaix, France
- Dates: 24 October
- Competitors: 22 from 16 nations

Medalists
gold medal	Lea Friedrich	Germany
silver medal	Mina Sato	Japan
bronze medal	Yana Tyshchenko

The Women's keirin competition at the 2021 UCI Track Cycling World Championships was held on 24 October 2021.

== Results ==
=== First round ===
The first round was started at 13:08. The first two riders from each heat qualified for the second round, all other riders moved to the repechages.

Heat 1

Rank	Name	Nation	Gap	Notes
1	Lauriane Genest	Canada		Q
2	Yana Tyshchenko	Russian Cycling Federation	+0.407	Q
3	Joanne Rodríguez	Guatemala	+0.478	
4	Veronika Jaborníková	Czech Republic	+0.570	
5	Alla Biletska	Ukraine	+0.767	
–	Emma Hinze	Germany	Did not start	

Heat 3

Rank	Name	Nation	Gap	Notes
1	Mathilde Gros	France		Q
2	Yuli Verdugo	Mexico	+0.378	Q
3	Laurine van Riessen	Netherlands	+0.457	
4	Urszula Łoś	Poland	+0.477	
5	Madalyn Godby	United States	+1.048	
–	Pauline Grabosch	Germany	Did not start	

Heat 2

Rank	Name	Nation	Gap	Notes
1	Martha Bayona	Colombia		Q
2	Lea Friedrich	Germany	+0.041	Q
3	Nicky Degrendele	Belgium	+0.117	
4	Mandy Marquardt	United States	+0.244	
5	Kelsey Mitchell	Canada	+0.325	
6	Sophie Capewell	Great Britain	+0.428	

Heat 4

Rank	Name	Nation	Gap	Notes
1	Shanne Braspennincx	Netherlands		Q
2	Mina Sato	Japan	+0.050	Q
3	Juliana Gaviria	Colombia	+0.554	
4	Alessa-Catriona Pröpster	Germany	+0.619	
5	Daria Shmeleva	Russian Cycling Federation	+0.817	
6	Helena Casas	Spain	+1.621	

=== First round repechage ===
The first round repechage was started at 13:34. The first rider from each heat qualified for the second round.

Heat 1

Rank	Name	Nation	Gap	Notes
1	Madalyn Godby	United States		Q
2	Sophie Capewell	Great Britain	+0.129	
3	Joanne Rodríguez	Guatemala	+0.166	
4	Alessa-Catriona Pröpster	Germany	+0.204	

Heat 3

Rank	Name	Nation	Gap	Notes
1	Laurine van Riessen	Netherlands		Q
2	Helena Casas	Spain	+0.097	
3	Mandy Marquardt	United States	+0.267	
4	Alla Biletska	Ukraine	+0.360	

Heat 2

Rank	Name	Nation	Gap	Notes
1	Kelsey Mitchell	Canada		Q
2	Nicky Degrendele	Belgium	+1.033	
3	Urszula Łoś	Poland	+2.992	

Heat 4

Rank	Name	Nation	Gap	Notes
1	Daria Shmeleva	Russian Cycling Federation		Q
2	Veronika Jaborníková	Czech Republic	+0.045	
3	Juliana Gaviria	Colombia	+1.311	

=== Second round ===
The second round was started at 14:35. The first three riders in each heat qualified for the final, all other riders raced for places 7 to 12.

Heat 1

Rank	Name	Nation	Gap	Notes
1	Lea Friedrich	Germany		Q
2	Madalyn Godby	United States	+0.056	Q
3	Daria Shmeleva	Russian Cycling Federation	+0.144	Q
4	Shanne Braspennincx	Netherlands	+0.178	
5	Lauriane Genest	Canada	+0.199	
6	Yuli Verdugo	Mexico	+0.273	

Heat 2

Rank	Name	Nation	Gap	Notes
1	Kelsey Mitchell	Canada		Q
2	Yana Tyshchenko	Russian Cycling Federation	+0.614	Q
3	Mina Sato	Japan	+0.729	Q
4	Mathilde Gros	France	+0.791	
5	Martha Bayona	Colombia	+0.851	
6	Laurine van Riessen	Netherlands	+0.869	

=== Finals ===
The finals were started at 16:23.

==== Small final ====
Rank	Name	Nation	Gap	Notes
7	Shanne Braspennincx	Netherlands		
8	Martha Bayona	Colombia	+0.042	
9	Mathilde Gros	France	+0.170	
10	Lauriane Genest	Canada	+0.205	
11	Laurine van Riessen	Netherlands	+0.532	
12	Yuli Verdugo	Mexico	Did not start	

==== Final ====
Rank	Name	Nation	Gap	Notes
1st place, gold medalist(s)	Lea Friedrich	Germany		
2nd place, silver medalist(s)	Mina Sato	Japan	+0.068	
3rd place, bronze medalist(s)	Yana Tyshchenko	Russian Cycling Federation	+0.184	
4	Madalyn Godby	United States	+0.331	
5	Kelsey Mitchell	Canada	+0.357	
6	Daria Shmeleva	Russian Cycling Federation	Did not start	
