= 2021 UCI Track Cycling World Championships – Women's sprint =

Women's sprint at the 2021 UCI Track Cycling World Championships
- Venue: Vélodrome Couvert Régional Jean Stablinski
- Location: Roubaix, France
- Dates: 21–22 October
- Competitors: 24 from 15 nations

Medalists
gold medal	Emma Hinze	Germany
silver medal	Lea Friedrich	Germany
bronze medal	Kelsey Mitchell	Canada

The Women's sprint competition at the 2021 UCI Track Cycling World Championships was held on 21 and 22 October 2021.

== Results ==
=== Qualifying ===
The qualifying was started on 21 October at 13:18. The top eight riders advanced directly to the 1/8 finals; places 9 to 24 advanced to the 1/16 final.

Rank	Name	Nation	Time	Behind	Notes
1	Lea Friedrich	Germany	10.489		Q
2	Emma Hinze	Germany	10.519	+0.030	Q
3	Kelsey Mitchell	Canada	10.520	+0.031	Q
4	Mathilde Gros	France	10.533	+0.044	Q
5	Lauriane Genest	Canada	10.545	+0.056	Q
6	Pauline Grabosch	Germany	10.572	+0.083	Q
7	Shanne Braspennincx	Netherlands	10.601	+0.112	Q
8	Martha Bayona	Colombia	10.754	+0.265	Q
9	Miriam Vece	Italy	10.790	+0.301	q
10	Riyu Ohta	Japan	10.791	+0.302	q
11	Sophie Capewell	Great Britain	10.821	+0.332	q
12	Sarah Orban	Canada	10.826	+0.337	q
13	Anastasia Voynova	Russian Cycling Federation	10.842	+0.353	q
14	Daria Shmeleva	Russian Cycling Federation	10.866	+0.377	q
15	Mandy Marquardt	United States	10.951	+0.462	q
16	Yuli Verdugo	Mexico	10.952	+0.463	q
17	Fuko Umekawa	Japan	11.016	+0.527	q
18	Madalyn Godby	United States	11.045	+0.556	q
19	Blaine Ridge-Davis	Great Britain	11.111	+0.622	q
20	Joanne Rodríguez	Guatemala	11.163	+0.674	q
21	Alla Biletska	Ukraine	11.273	+0.784	q
22	Veronika Jaborníková	Czech Republic	11.273	+0.784	q
23	Helena Casas	Spain	11.286	+0.797	q
24	Yarli Mosquera	Colombia	11.409	+0.920	q

=== 1/16 finals ===
The 1/16 finals were started on 21 October at 14:10. Each heat winner advanced to the 1/8 finals.

Heat	Rank	Name	Nation	Gap	Notes
1	1	Miriam Vece	Italy		Q
1	2	Yarli Mosquera	Colombia	+0.124	
2	1	Riyu Ohta	Japan		Q
2	2	Helena Casas	Spain	+0.208	
3	1	Sophie Capewell	Great Britain		Q
3	2	Veronika Jaborníková	Czech Republic	+0.603	
4	1	Alla Biletska	Ukraine		Q
4	2	Sarah Orban	Canada	REL	
5	1	Anastasia Voynova	Russian Cycling Federation		Q
5	2	Joanne Rodríguez	Guatemala	+0.273	
6	1	Daria Shmeleva	Russian Cycling Federation		Q
6	2	Blaine Ridge-Davis	Great Britain	+0.071	
7	1	Madalyn Godby	United States		Q
7	2	Mandy Marquardt	United States	+0.013	
8	1	Yuli Verdugo	Mexico		Q
8	2	Fuko Umekawa	Japan	+0.110	

=== 1/8 finals ===
The 1/16 finals were started on 21 October at 14:49. Each heat winner advanced to the quarterfinals.

Heat	Rank	Name	Nation	Gap	Notes
1	1	Lea Friedrich	Germany		Q
1	2	Yuli Verdugo	Mexico	+0.038	
2	1	Emma Hinze	Germany		Q
2	2	Madalyn Godby	United States	+0.404	
3	1	Kelsey Mitchell	Canada		Q
3	2	Daria Shmeleva	Russian Cycling Federation	+3.048	
4	1	Mathilde Gros	France		Q
4	2	Anastasia Voynova	Russian Cycling Federation	+0.106	
5	1	Lauriane Genest	Canada		Q
5	2	Alla Biletska	Ukraine	+0.108	
6	1	Pauline Grabosch	Germany		Q
6	2	Sophie Capewell	Great Britain	+0.071	
7	1	Shanne Braspennincx	Netherlands		Q
7	2	Riyu Ohta	Japan	+0.088	
8	1	Miriam Vece	Italy		Q
8	2	Martha Bayona	Colombia	+0.022	

=== Quarterfinals ===
The quarterfinals were started on 21 October at 18:58. Matches were raced in a best-of-three format hereon; winners proceed to the semifinals.

Heat	Rank	Name	Nation	Race 1	Race 2	Decider (i.r.)	Notes
1	1	Lea Friedrich	Germany	X	X		Q
1	2	Miriam Vece	Italy	+0.126	+0.098		
2	1	Emma Hinze	Germany	X	X		Q
2	2	Shanne Braspennincx	Netherlands	+0.097	+0.177		
3	1	Kelsey Mitchell	Canada	X	X		Q
3	2	Pauline Grabosch	Germany	+0.051	+0.084		
4	1	Lauriane Genest	Canada	+0.167	X	X	Q
4	2	Mathilde Gros	France	X	+0.263	+0.035	

=== Semifinals ===
The semifinals were started on 21 October at 19:24. Matches were raced in a best-of-three format hereon; winners proceeded to the final, losers to the bronze medal race.

Heat	Rank	Name	Nation	Race 1	Race 2	Decider (i.r.)	Notes
1	1	Lea Friedrich	Germany	X	X		Q
1	2	Lauriane Genest	Canada	+0.102	+0.106		
2	1	Emma Hinze	Germany	X	X		Q
2	2	Kelsey Mitchell	Canada	+0.071	+0.060		

=== Finals ===
The finals were started at 20:51. Matches were raced in a best-of-three format hereon.

Rank	Name	Nation	Race 1	Race 2	Decider (i.r.)
Gold medal race
1st place, gold medalist(s)	Emma Hinze	Germany	X	X	
2nd place, silver medalist(s)	Lea Friedrich	Germany	+0.117	+0.129	
Bronze medal race
3rd place, bronze medalist(s)	Kelsey Mitchell	Canada	X	X	
4	Lauriane Genest	Canada	+0.087	+0.050	
