= Cycling at the 2022 Commonwealth Games – Women's keirin =

Cycling Track – Women's keirin at the 2022 Commonwealth Games
- Venue: Lee Valley VeloPark
- Dates: 1 August 2022
- Competitors: 22 from 9 nations

Medalists
gold medal	Ellesse Andrews	New Zealand
silver medal	Sophie Capewell	England
bronze medal	Kelsey Mitchell	Canada

The women's keirin at the 2022 Commonwealth Games was part of the cycling programme, which took place on 1 August 2022.

== Schedule ==
The schedule is as follows:

All times are British Summer Time (UTC+1)

Date	Time	Round
Saturday 1 August 2022	14:02	First round
Saturday 1 August 2022	14:42	First round repechages
Saturday 1 August 2022	16:08	Second round
Saturday 1 August 2022	16:43	Finals

== Results ==
=== First round ===
The top two in each heat advanced directly to the second round; the remainder were sent to the first round repechages.

Heat 1

Rank	Rider	Gap	Notes
1	Kelsey Mitchell (CAN)	–	Q
2	Alessia McCaig (AUS)	+0.114	Q
3	Lauren Bell (SCO)	+0.193	R
4	Anis Rosidi (MAS)	+0.372	R
5	Eleanor Victoria Coster (WAL)	+0.487	R

Heat 2

Rank	Rider	Gap	Notes
1	Ellesse Andrews (NZL)	–	Q
2	Breanna Hargrave (AUS)	+0.307	Q
3	Sarah Orban (CAN)	+0.571	R
4	Millie Tanner (ENG)	+0.892	R
5	Izzah Asri (MAS)	+1.023	R

Heat 3

Rank	Rider	Gap	Notes
1	Lauriane Genest (CAN)	–	Q
2	Emma Finucane (WAL)	+0.051	Q
3	Lusia Steele (SCO)	+0.115	R
4	Dahlia Palmer (JAM)	+0.269	R
5	Blaine Ridge-Davis (ENG)	+0.576	R
6	Triyasha Paul (IND)	+0.606	R

Heat 4

Rank	Rider	Gap	Notes
1	Sophie Capewell (ENG)	–	Q
2	Kristina Clonan (AUS)	+0.083	Q
3	Rhian Edmunds (WAL)	+0.140	R
4	Olivia King (NZL)	+0.281	R
5	Iona Moir (SCO)	+0.441	R
6	Shushikala Agashe (IND)	+0.759	R

=== First round repechages ===
Only the repechage winners advanced to the second round.

Heat 1

Rank	Rider	Gap	Notes
1	Lauren Bell (SCO)	–	Q
2	Olivia King (NZL)	+0.353	
3	Blaine Ridge-Davis (ENG)	+0.543	

Heat 2

Rank	Rider	Gap	Notes
1	Sarah Orban (CAN)	–	Q
2	Dahlia Palmer (JAM)	+0.027	
3	Izzah Asri (MAS)	+0.528	

Heat 3

Rank	Rider	Gap	Notes
1	Millie Tanner (ENG)	–	Q
2	Lusia Steele (SCO)	+0.063	
3	Eleanor Victoria Coster (WAL)	+0.074	
4	Shushikala Agashe (IND)	+1.759	

Heat 4

Rank	Rider	Gap	Notes
1	Rhian Edmunds (WAL)	–	Q
2	Anis Rosidi (MAS)	+0.267	
3	Triyasha Paul (IND)	+0.314	
4	Iona Moir (SCO)	+0.526	

=== Second round ===
The top three in each heat advanced to the final; the remainder were sent to the small final (for places 7–12).

Heat 1

Rank	Rider	Gap	Notes
1	Kelsey Mitchell (CAN)	–	FA
2	Sophie Capewell (ENG)	+0.006	FA
3	Emma Finucane (WAL)	+0.118	FA
4	Breanna Hargrave (AUS)	+0.233	FB
5	Lauren Bell (SCO)	+0.463	FB
6	Sarah Orban (CAN)	+0.778	FB

Heat 2

Rank	Rider	Gap	Notes
1	Ellesse Andrews (NZL)	–	FA
2	Rhian Edmunds (WAL)	+0.065	FA
3	Millie Tanner (ENG)	+0.128	FA
4	Kristina Clonan (AUS)	+0.139	FB
5	Lauriane Genest (CAN)	+0.288	FB
6	Alessia McCaig (AUS)	+0.601	FB

=== Finals ===
The final classification was determined in the medal finals.

Final (places 7–12)

Rank	Rider	Gap
7	Lauriane Genest (CAN)	–
8	Kristina Clonan (AUS)	+0.441
9	Sarah Orban (CAN)	+0.513
10	Lauren Bell (SCO)	+0.727
11	Alessia McCaig (AUS)	+1.615
12	Breanna Hargrave (AUS)	REL

Final (places 1–6)

Rank	Rider	Gap
1st place, gold medalist(s)	Ellesse Andrews (NZL)	–
2nd place, silver medalist(s)	Sophie Capewell (ENG)	+0.050
3rd place, bronze medalist(s)	Kelsey Mitchell (CAN)	+0.156
4	Emma Finucane (WAL)	+0.495
5	Millie Tanner (ENG)	+0.560
6	Rhian Edmunds (WAL)	+0.748
