= 2020 UCI Track Cycling World Championships – Women's team sprint =

Women's team sprint at the 2020 UCI Track Cycling World Championships
- Venue: Velodrom
- Location: Berlin, Germany
- Dates: 26 February
- Competitors: 31 from 15 nations
- Teams: 15

Medalists
gold medal	Pauline Grabosch; Emma Hinze; Lea Friedrich	Germany
silver medal	Kaarle McCulloch; Stephanie Morton	Australia
bronze medal	Chen Feifei; Zhong Tianshi	China

The Women's team sprint competition at the 2020 UCI Track Cycling World Championships was held on 26 February 2020.

== Results ==
=== Qualifying ===
The qualifying was started at 18:30. The first eight teams advanced to the first round.

Rank	Nation	Time	Behind	Notes
1	Russia; Daria Shmeleva; Anastasia Voynova	32.461		Q
2	China; Chen Feifei; Zhong Tianshi	32.580	+0.119	Q
3	Australia; Kaarle McCulloch; Stephanie Morton	32.696	+0.235	Q
4	Canada; Lauriane Genest; Kelsey Mitchell	32.829	+0.368	Q
5	Germany; Pauline Grabosch; Lea Friedrich	32.840	+0.379	Q
6	Mexico; Jessica Salazar; Daniela Gaxiola	32.923	+0.462	Q
7	Netherlands; Kyra Lamberink; Steffie van der Peet	32.929	+0.468	Q
8	Poland; Marlena Karwacka; Urszula Łoś	32.953	+0.492	Q
9	Lithuania; Miglė Marozaitė; Simona Krupeckaitė	33.060	+0.599	
10	New Zealand; Olivia Podmore; Natasha Hansen	33.184	+0.723	
11	Spain; Tania Calvo; Helena Casas	33.816	+1.355	
12	Colombia; Juliana Gaviria; Martha Bayona	33.826	+1.365	
13	South Korea; Kim Soo-hyun; Lee Hye-jin	34.171	+1.710	
14	Ukraine; Olena Starikova; Lyubov Basova	34.213	+1.752	
15	Italy; Miriam Vece; Elena Bissolati	39.314	+2.453	

=== First round ===
The first round was started at 20:16.

First round heats were held as follows:
Heat 1: 4th v 5th fastest
Heat 2: 3rd v 6th fastest
Heat 3: 2nd v 7th fastest
Heat 4: 1st v 8th fastest

The heat winners were ranked on time, from which the top 2 advanced to the gold medal final and the other 2 proceeded to the bronze medal final.

Rank	Overall rank	Nation	Time	Behind	Notes
4 vs 5
1	1	Germany; Pauline Grabosch; Emma Hinze	32.265		QG
2	5	Canada; Lauriane Genest; Kelsey Mitchell	32.473	+0.208	
3 vs 6
1	2	Australia; Kaarle McCulloch; Stephanie Morton	32.353		QG
2	8	Mexico; Daniela Gaxiola; Jessica Salazar	32.881	+0.528	
2 vs 7
1	3	China; Chen Feifei; Zhong Tianshi	32.403		QB
2	6	Netherlands; Kyra Lamberink; Steffie van der Peet	32.833	+0.430	
1 vs 8
1	4	Russia; Daria Shmeleva; Anastasia Voynova	32.415		QB
2	7	Poland; Marlena Karwacka; Urszula Łoś	32.838	+0.423	

- QG = qualified for gold medal final
- QB = qualified for bronze medal final

=== Finals ===
The finals were started at 21:14.

Rank	Nation	Time	Behind	Notes
Gold medal race
1st place, gold medalist(s)	Germany; Pauline Grabosch; Emma Hinze	32.163		
2nd place, silver medalist(s)	Australia; Kaarle McCulloch; Stephanie Morton	32.384	+0.221	
Bronze medal race
3rd place, bronze medalist(s)	China; Chen Feifei; Zhong Tianshi	32.371		
4	Russia; Daria Shmeleva; Anastasia Voynova	32.466	+0.095	
