= 2023 UCI Track Cycling World Championships – Women's 500 m time trial =

Women's 500 m time trial at the 2023 UCI Track Cycling World Championships
- Venue: Sir Chris Hoy Velodrome
- Location: Glasgow, United Kingdom
- Dates: 4 August
- Competitors: 26 from 18 nations
- Winning time: 32.820

Medalists
gold medal	Emma Hinze	Germany
silver medal	Kristina Clonan	Australia
bronze medal	Lea Friedrich	Germany

The Women's 500 m time trial competition at the 2023 UCI Track Cycling World Championships was held on 4 August 2023.

== Results ==
=== Qualifying ===
The qualifying was held at 11:12. The top eight riders qualified for the final.

Rank	Name	Nation	Time	Behind	Notes
1	Emma Hinze	Germany	32.850		Q
2	Kristina Clonan	Australia	33.004	+0.154	Q
3	Sophie Capewell	Great Britain	33.042	+0.192	Q
4	Lea Friedrich	Germany	33.336	+0.486	Q
5	Pauline Grabosch	Germany	33.371	+0.521	Q
6	Guo Yufang	China	33.375	+0.525	Q
7	Jiang Yulu	China	33.384	+0.534	Q
8	Bao Shanju	China	33.482	+0.632	Q
9	Martha Bayona	Colombia	33.546	+0.696	
10	Taky Marie-Divine Kouamé	France	33.676	+0.826	
11	Miriam Vece	Italy	33.680	+0.830	
12	Lauren Bell	Great Britain	33.992	+1.142	
13	Kyra Lamberink	Netherlands	34.015	+1.165	
14	Rebecca Petch	New Zealand	34.062	+1.212	
15	Shanne Braspennincx	Netherlands	34.143	+1.293	
16	Mandy Marquardt	United States	34.456	+1.606	
17	Jessica Salazar	Mexico	34.469	+1.619	
18	Veronika Jaborníková	Czech Republic	34.678	+1.828	
19	Nurul Mohd	Malaysia	34.879	+2.029	
20	Julie Michaux	France	34.962	+2.112	
21	Aki Sakai	Japan	34.966	+2.116	
22	Natalia Vera	Argentina	35.246	+2.396	
23	Yeung Cho Yiu	Hong Kong	35.570	+2.720	
24	Ese Ukpeseraye	Nigeria	38.604	+5.754	
25	Shahd Mohamed	Egypt	38.697	+5.847	
26	Tombrapa Grikpa	Nigeria	39.958	+7.108	

=== Final ===
The final was started at 19:23.

Rank	Name	Nation	Time	Behind	Notes
1st place, gold medalist(s)	Emma Hinze	Germany	32.820		
2nd place, silver medalist(s)	Kristina Clonan	Australia	32.956	+0.136	
3rd place, bronze medalist(s)	Lea Friedrich	Germany	33.134	+0.314	
4	Sophie Capewell	Great Britain	33.256	+0.436	
5	Pauline Grabosch	Germany	33.296	+0.476	
6	Bao Shanju	China	33.378	+0.558	
7	Guo Yufang	China	33.410	+0.590	
8	Jiang Yulu	China	33.460	+0.640	
