= 2021 UCI Track Cycling World Championships – Women's team sprint =

Women's team sprint at the 2021 UCI Track Cycling World Championships
- Venue: Vélodrome Couvert Régional Jean-Stablinski
- Location: Roubaix, France
- Dates: 20 October
- Competitors: 26 from 8 nations
- Teams: 8
- Winning time: 46.064

Medalists
gold medal	Lea Friedrich; Pauline Grabosch; Emma Hinze	Germany
silver medal	Natalia Antonova; Daria Shmeleva; Yana Tyshchenko; Anastasia Voynova
bronze medal	Sophie Capewell; Blaine Ridge-Davis; Milly Tanner; Lauren Bate	Great Britain

The Women's team sprint competition at the 2021 UCI Track Cycling World Championships was held on 20 October 2021.

== Results ==
=== Qualifying ===
The qualifying was started at 18:30. All teams advanced to the first round.

Rank	Nation	Time	Behind	Notes
1	Germany; Pauline Grabosch; Lea Friedrich; Emma Hinze	46.511		WR
2	Russian Cycling Federation; Natalia Antonova; Anastasia Voynova; Yana Tyshchenko	47.031	+0.520	
3	Canada; Lauriane Genest; Kelsey Mitchell; Sarah Orban	48.362	+1.851	
4	Great Britain; Milly Tanner; Lauren Bate; Blaine Ridge-Davis	48.388	+1.877	
5	Poland; Marlena Karwacka; Urszula Łoś; Nikola Sibiak	48.778	+2.267	
6	Japan; Fuko Umekawa; Riyu Ohta; Mina Sato	49.178	+2.667	
7	Ukraine; Lyubov Basova; Alla Biletska; Oleksandra Lohviniuk	50.230	+3.719	
8	Nigeria; Tawakalt Yekeen; Mary Samuel; Ese Ukpeseraye	55.653	+9.142	

=== First round ===
First round heats were held as follows:
Heat 1: 4th v 5th fastest
Heat 2: 3rd v 6th fastest
Heat 3: 2nd v 7th fastest
Heat 4: 1st v 8th fastest (cancelled and both teams raced alone)

The first round was started at 19:53. The heat winners were ranked on time, from which the top two advanced to the gold medal race and the other two proceeded to the bronze medal race.

Heat	Rank	Nation	Time	Behind	Notes
1		Nigeria; Mary Samuel; Ese Ukpeseraye; Tawakalt Yekeen	55.734		
2	1	Great Britain; Lauren Bate; Blaine Ridge-Davis; Milly Tanner	48.066		QB
2	2	Poland; Marlena Karwacka; Urszula Łoś; Nikola Sibiak	48.156	+0.090	
3	1	Japan; Riyu Ohta; Mina Sato; Fuko Umekawa	48.622		QB
3	2	Canada; Lauriane Genest; Kelsey Mitchell; Sarah Orban	Relegated		
4	1	Russian Cycling Federation; Natalia Antonova; Daria Shmeleva; Anastasia Voynova	47.043		QG
4	2	Ukraine; Lyubov Basova; Alla Biletska; Oleksandra Lohviniuk	50.043	+3.000	
5		Germany; Lea Friedrich; Pauline Grabosch; Emma Hinze	46.358		QG, WR

- QG = qualified for gold medal final
- QB = qualified for bronze medal final

=== Finals ===
The finals were started at 20:51.

Rank	Nation	Time	Behind	Notes
Gold medal race
1st place, gold medalist(s)	Germany; Lea Friedrich; Pauline Grabosch; Emma Hinze	46.064		WR
2nd place, silver medalist(s)	Russian Cycling Federation; Natalia Antonova; Daria Shmeleva; Yana Tyshchenko	46.718	+0.654	
Bronze medal race
3rd place, bronze medalist(s)	Great Britain; Sophie Capewell; Blaine Ridge-Davis; Milly Tanner	48.059		
4	Japan; Riyu Ohta; Mina Sato; Fuko Umekawa	48.612	+0.553	
