= 2020 UCI Track Cycling World Championships – Women's keirin =

Women's keirin at the 2020 UCI Track Cycling World Championships
- Venue: Velodrom
- Location: Berlin, Germany
- Dates: 1 March
- Competitors: 27 from 19 nations

Medalists
gold medal	Emma Hinze	Germany
silver medal	Lee Hye-jin	South Korea
bronze medal	Stephanie Morton	Australia

The Women's keirin competition at the 2020 UCI Track Cycling World Championships was held on 1 March 2020.

== Results ==
=== First round ===
The first round was started at 11:08. The first two riders from each qualified for the next round, all other riders moved to the repechages.

Heat 1

Rank	Name	Nation	Gap	Notes
1	Katy Marchant	Great Britain		Q
2	Lee Wai Sze	Hong Kong	+0.035	Q
3	Lyubov Basova	Ukraine	+0.132	
4	Simona Krupeckaitė	Lithuania	+0.199	
5	Anastasia Voynova	Russia	+0.417	

Heat 3

Rank	Name	Nation	Gap	Notes
1	Shanne Braspennincx	Netherlands		Q
2	Stephanie Morton	Australia	+0.024	Q
3	Martha Bayona	Colombia	+0.077	
4	Natasha Hansen	New Zealand	+0.105	
5	Helena Casas	Spain	+0.453	

Heat 5

Rank	Name	Nation	Gap	Notes
1	Emma Hinze	Germany		Q
2	Madalyn Godby	United States	+0.088	Q
3	Yuka Kobayashi	Japan	+0.175	
4	Lauriane Genest	Canada	+0.398	
5	Charlene Du Perez	South Africa	+0.807	
6	Olivia Podmore	New Zealand	+0.982	

Heat 2

Rank	Name	Nation	Gap	Notes
1	Nicky Degrendele	Belgium		Q
2	Lee Hye-jin	South Korea	+0.082	Q
3	Riyu Ohta	Japan	+0.395	
4	Urszula Łoś	Poland	+0.367	
5	Jessica Lee Hoi Yan	Hong Kong	+0.377	

Heat 4

Rank	Name	Nation	Gap	Notes
1	Lea Friedrich	Germany		Q
2	Ellesse Andrews	New Zealand	+0.070	Q
3	Kelsey Mitchell	Canada	+0.178	
4	Mathilde Gros	France	+0.313	
5	Daria Shmeleva	Russia	+2.907	
–	Laurine van Riessen	Netherlands	Did not finish	

=== First round repechage ===
The first round repechage was started at 11:49. The first two riders in each heat qualified for the quarterfinals.

Heat 1

Rank	Name	Nation	Gap	Notes
1	Lauriane Genest	Canada		Q
2	Mathilde Gros	France	+0.023	Q
3	Lyubov Basova	Ukraine	+0.064	
4	Daria Shmeleva	Russia	+0.207	

Heat 3

Rank	Name	Nation	Gap	Notes
1	Anastasia Voynova	Russia		Q
2	Martha Bayona	Colombia	+0.021	Q
3	Urszula Łoś	Poland	+0.223	
4	Olivia Podmore	New Zealand	+0.228	

Heat 2

Rank	Name	Nation	Gap	Notes
1	Laurine van Riessen	Netherlands		Q
2	Natasha Hansen	New Zealand	+0.033	Q
3	Riyu Ohta	Japan	+0.152	
4	Charlene Du Perez	South Africa	+0.749	
5	Simona Krupeckaitė	Lithuania	+0.824	

Heat 4

Rank	Name	Nation	Gap	Notes
1	Kelsey Mitchell	Canada		Q
2	Helena Casas	Spain	+0.061	Q
3	Yuka Kobayashi	Japan	+0.097	
4	Jessica Lee Hoi Yan	Hong Kong	+1.061	

=== Quarterfinals ===
The quarterfinals started at 14:47. The first four riders in each heat qualified for the semifinals.

Heat 1

Rank	Name	Nation	Gap	Notes
1	Lea Friedrich	Germany		Q
2	Lee Hye-jin	South Korea	+0.042	Q
3	Katy Marchant	Great Britain	+0.106	Q
4	Laurine van Riessen	Netherlands	+0.124	Q
5	Anastasia Voynova	Russia	+0.193	
6	Helena Casas	Spain	+0.209	

Heat 3

Rank	Name	Nation	Gap	Notes
1	Lee Wai Sze	Hong Kong		Q
2	Madalyn Godby	United States	+0.050	Q
3	Ellesse Andrews	New Zealand	+0.067	Q
4	Mathilde Gros	France	+0.086	Q
5	Shanne Braspennincx	Netherlands	+0.096	
6	Kelsey Mitchell	Canada	+0.190	

Heat 2

Rank	Name	Nation	Gap	Notes
1	Emma Hinze	Germany		Q
2	Stephanie Morton	Australia	+0.090	Q
3	Natasha Hansen	New Zealand	+0.194	Q
4	Nicky Degrendele	Belgium	+0.228	Q
5	Martha Bayona	Colombia	+0.276	
6	Lauriane Genest	Canada	+0.367	

=== Semifinals ===
The semifinals were started at 16:03. The first three riders in each heat qualified for the final, all other riders raced for places 7 to 12.

Heat 1

Rank	Name	Nation	Gap	Notes
1	Stephanie Morton	Australia		Q
2	Lee Hye-jin	South Korea	+0.034	Q
3	Lea Friedrich	Germany	+0.075	Q
4	Mathilde Gros	France	+0.110	
5	Natasha Hansen	New Zealand	+0.156	
6	Laurine van Riessen	Netherlands	+0.349	

Heat 2

Rank	Name	Nation	Gap	Notes
1	Emma Hinze	Germany		Q
2	Lee Wai Sze	Hong Kong	+0.043	Q
3	Ellesse Andrews	New Zealand	+0.094	Q
4	Katy Marchant	Great Britain	+0.096	
5	Nicky Degrendele	Belgium	+0.161	
6	Madalyn Godby	United States	+0.216	

=== Finals ===
The finals were started at 16:36.

==== Small final ====
Rank	Name	Nation	Gap	Notes
7	Laurine van Riessen	Netherlands		
8	Katy Marchant	Great Britain	+0.070	
9	Mathilde Gros	France	+0.130	
10	Madalyn Godby	United States	+1:22.118	
11	Nicky Degrendele	Belgium	+1:21.851	
12	Natasha Hansen	New Zealand	Did not finish	

==== Final ====
Rank	Name	Nation	Gap	Notes
1st place, gold medalist(s)	Emma Hinze	Germany		
2nd place, silver medalist(s)	Lee Hye-jin	South Korea	+0.128	
3rd place, bronze medalist(s)	Stephanie Morton	Australia	+0.198	
4	Lee Wai Sze	Hong Kong	+0.327	
5	Ellesse Andrews	New Zealand	+0.389	
6	Lea Friedrich	Germany	+0.710	
