= 2022 UCI Track Cycling World Championships – Women's 500 m time trial =

Women's 500 m time trial at the 2022 UCI Track Cycling World Championships
- Venue: Vélodrome National
- Location: Saint-Quentin-en-Yvelines, France
- Dates: 15 October
- Competitors: 25 from 15 nations

Medalists
| gold medal | Taky Marie-Divine Kouamé | France |
| silver medal | Emma Hinze | Germany |
| bronze medal | Guo Yufang | China |

The Women's 500 m time trial competition at the 2022 UCI Track Cycling World Championships will be held on 15 October 2022.

== Results ==
=== Qualifying ===
The qualifying was started at 12:00. The top eight riders qualified for the final.

| Rank | Name | Nation | Time | Behind | Notes |
|---|---|---|---|---|---|
| 1 | Emma Hinze | Germany | 32.968 | | Q |
| 2 | Taky Marie-Divine Kouamé | France | 33.159 | +0.191 | Q |
| 3 | Kristina Clonan | Australia | 33.178 | +0.210 | Q |
| 4 | Hetty van de Wouw | Netherlands | 33.183 | +0.215 | Q |
| 5 | Martha Bayona | Colombia | 33.235 | +0.267 | Q |
| 6 | Kelsey Mitchell | Canada | 33.268 | +0.300 | Q |
| 7 | Guo Yufang | China | 33.295 | +0.327 | Q |
| 8 | Kyra Lamberink | Netherlands | 33.313 | +0.345 | Q |
| 9 | Lea Friedrich | Germany | 33.320 | +0.352 | |
| 10 | Pauline Grabosch | Germany | 33.378 | +0.410 | |
| 11 | Emma Finucane | Great Britain | 33.659 | +0.691 | |
| 12 | Lauren Bell | Great Britain | 33.915 | +0.947 | |
| 13 | Marlena Karwacka | Poland | 33.955 | +0.987 | |
| 14 | Urszula Łoś | Poland | 33.957 | +0.989 | |
| 15 | Alessa-Catriona Pröpster | Germany | 34.015 | +1.047 | |
| 16 | Julie Michaux | France | 34.089 | +1.121 | |
| 17 | Miriam Vece | Italy | 34.301 | +1.333 | |
| 18 | Veronika Jaborníková | Czech Republic | 34.382 | +1.414 | |
| 19 | Sarah Orban | Canada | 34.499 | +1.531 | |
| 20 | Helena Casas | Spain | 34.554 | +1.586 | |
| 21 | Orla Walsh | Ireland | 34.765 | +1.797 | |
| 22 | Anis Amira Rosidi | Malaysia | 35.349 | +2.381 | |
| 23 | Nurul Izzah Izzati Mohd Asri | Malaysia | 35.513 | +2.545 | |
| 24 | Nurul Aliana Syafika Azizan | Malaysia | 36.936 | +3.968 | |
| 25 | Tombrapa Grikpa | Nigeria | 40.219 | +7.251 | |

=== Final ===
The final was started at 17:30.

| Rank | Name | Nation | Time | Behind | Notes |
|---|---|---|---|---|---|
| 1st place, gold medalist(s) | Taky Marie-Divine Kouamé | France | 32.835 | | |
| 2nd place, silver medalist(s) | Emma Hinze | Germany | 33.051 | +0.216 | |
| 3rd place, bronze medalist(s) | Guo Yufang | China | 33.214 | +0.379 | |
| 4 | Hetty van de Wouw | Netherlands | 33.243 | +0.408 | |
| 5 | Kristina Clonan | Australia | 33.295 | +0.460 | |
| 6 | Martha Bayona | Colombia | 33.347 | +0.512 | |
| 7 | Kelsey Mitchell | Canada | 33.359 | +0.524 | |
| 8 | Kyra Lamberink | Netherlands | 33.703 | +0.868 | |
