= Cycling at the 2019 Pan American Games – Women's sprint =

Women's sprint at the 2019 Pan American Games
- Venue: Velodrome
- Dates: August 3–4
- Competitors: 15 from 9 nations

Medalists
Gold medal	Kelsey Mitchell	Canada
Silver medal	Martha Bayona	Colombia
Bronze medal	Daniela Gaxiola	Mexico

The women's sprint competition of the cycling events at the 2019 Pan American Games was held on August 3 and August 4 at the Velodrome.

== Records ==
Prior to this competition, the existing world and Games records were as follows:

World record	Kristina Vogel (GER)	10.384	Aguascalientes, Mexico	7 December 2013
Games record	Monique Sullivan (CAN)	10.992	Toronto, Canada	18 July 2015

== Schedule ==
Date	Time	Round
August 3, 2019	11:05	Qualification
August 3, 2019	12:37	Eighth-finals
August 3, 2019	13:41	Repechage
August 3, 2019	18:05	Quarterfinals
August 4, 2019	11:05	Semifinals
August 4, 2019	13:32	Race For 5th-8th Places
August 4, 2019	18:05	Finals

== Results ==
=== Qualification ===
Fastest 12 riders continue to the eighth-finals.

Rank	Name	Nation	Time	Notes
1	Kelsey Mitchell	Canada	10.890	Q, GR
2	Martha Bayona	Colombia	11.134	Q
3	Daniela Gaxiola	Mexico	11.291	Q
4	Lisandra Guerra	Cuba	11.422	Q
5	Jessica Salazar	Mexico	11.435	Q
6	Amelia Walsh	Canada	11.453	Q
7	Joanne Rodríguez	Guatemala	11.659	Q
8	Juliana Gaviria	Colombia	11.710	Q
9	Dahlia Palmer	Jamaica	11.884	Q
10	Natalia Vera	Argentina	11.935	Q
11	Katheryne Cargua	Ecuador	12.339	Q
12	Genesis Lozano	Ecuador	12.677	Q
13	Mariana Díaz	Argentina	12.845	
14	Ghillma Bendezu	Peru	13.021	
15	Estephany Valdivia	Peru	13.597	

=== Eighth-finals ===
The winners of each advance to the quarterfinals, while the losers advance to the repechage

Heat	Rank	Name	Nation	Time	Notes
1	1	Kelsey Mitchell	Canada	11.755	Q
1	2	Genesis Lozano	Ecuador		
2	1	Martha Bayona	Colombia	11.904	Q
2	2	Katheryne Cargua	Ecuador		
3	1	Daniela Gaxiola	Mexico	11.661	Q
3	2	Natalia Vera	Argentina		
4	1	Lisandra Guerra	Cuba	11.920	Q
4	2	Dahlia Palmer	Jamaica		
5	1	Jessica Salazar	Mexico	11.790	Q
5	2	Juliana Gaviria	Colombia		
6	1	Amelia Walsh	Canada	11.910	Q
6	2	Joanne Rodríguez	Guatemala		

=== Repechage ===
The winner of each advanced to the quarterfinals.

Heat	Rank	Name	Nation	Time	Notes
1	1	Juliana Gaviria	Colombia	11.962	Q
1	2	Dahlia Palmer	Jamaica		
1	3	Genesis Lozano	Ecuador		
2	1	Joanne Rodríguez	Guatemala	12.037	Q
2	2	Natalia Vera	Argentina		
2	3	Katheryne Cargua	Ecuador		

=== Quarterfinals ===
The winner of each advanced to the semifinals.

Heat	Rank	Name	Nation	Race 1	Race 2	Decide	Notes
1	1	Kelsey Mitchell	Canada	11.486	11.795		Q
1	2	Joanne Rodríguez	Guatemala				
2	1	Martha Bayona	Colombia	12.029	12.176		Q
2	2	Juliana Gaviria	Colombia				
3	1	Daniela Gaxiola	Mexico	11.654	11.778		Q
3	2	Amelia Walsh	Canada				
4	1	Jessica Salazar	Mexico	11.528		11.709	Q
4	2	Lisandra Guerra	Cuba		11.701		

=== Semifinals ===
The winner of each advanced to the final.

Heat	Rank	Name	Nation	Race 1	Race 2	Decide	Notes
1	1	Kelsey Mitchell	Canada	11.526	11.330		Q
1	2	Jessica Salazar	Mexico				
2	1	Martha Bayona	Colombia		11.457	12.197	Q
2	2	Daniela Gaxiola	Mexico	11.426			

=== Race for 5th–8th Places ===
Rank	Name	Nation	Time	Notes
5	Lisandra Guerra	Cuba	12.115	
6	Joanne Rodríguez	Guatemala		
7	Amelia Walsh	Canada		
8	Juliana Gaviria	Colombia	DNS	

=== Finals ===
The final classification is determined in the medal finals.

Rank	Name	Nation	Race 1	Race 2	Decide	Notes
Gold medal final
1st place, gold medalist(s)	Kelsey Mitchell	Canada	11.415	11.449		
2nd place, silver medalist(s)	Martha Bayona	Colombia				
Bronze medal final
3rd place, bronze medalist(s)	Daniela Gaxiola	Mexico	11.413	11.646		
4	Jessica Salazar	Mexico				
