= Cycling at the 2022 Commonwealth Games – Women's 500 m time trial =

Cycling Track – Women's 500 m time trial at the 2022 Commonwealth Games
- Venue: Lee Valley VeloPark
- Dates: 31 July
- Competitors: 20 from 9 nations
- Winning time: 33.234

Medalists
gold medal	Kristina Clonan	Australia
silver medal	Kelsey Mitchell	Canada
bronze medal	Sophie Capewell	England

The women's 500 m time trial at the 2022 Commonwealth Games was part of the cycling programme, which took place on 31 July 2022.

== Records ==
Prior to this competition, the existing world and Games records were as follows:

World record	Jessica Salazar (MEX)	32.268	Aguascalientes, Mexico	7 October 2016
Games record	Anna Meares (AUS)	33.435	Glasgow, United Kingdom	24 July 2014

== Results ==
Rank	Rider	Time	Behind	Notes
1st place, gold medalist(s)	Kristina Clonan (AUS)	33.234	—	GR
2nd place, silver medalist(s)	Kelsey Mitchell (CAN)	33.294	+0.060	
3rd place, bronze medalist(s)	Sophie Capewell (ENG)	33.522	+0.288	
4	Rebecca Petch (NZL)	33.843	+0.609	
5	Emma Finucane (WAL)	33.916	+0.682	
6	Lauren Bell (SCO)	33.954	+0.720	
7	Breanna Hargrave (AUS)	33.995	+0.761	
8	Alessia McCaig (AUS)	34.382	+1.148	
9	Iona Moir (SCO)	34.687	+1.453	
10	Millie Tanner (ENG)	34.871	+1.637	
11	Blaine Ridge-Davis (ENG)	34.956	+1.722	
12	Lusia Steele (SCO)	35.002	+1.768	
13	Eleanor Coster (WAL)	35.116	+1.882	
14	Sarah Orban (CAN)	35.174	+1.940	
15	Anis Amira Rosidi (MAS)	35.503	+2.269	
16	Nurul Izzah Asri (MAS)	35.871	+2.637	
17	Devaney Collier (CAN)	36.595	+3.361	
18	Mayuri Lute (IND)	36.868	+3.634	
19	Erica Sedzro (GHA)	49.452	+16.218	
20	Florence Heridor (GHA)	54.062	+20.828	
	Nurul Aliana Syafika Azizan (MAS)	Did not start		
	Lowri Thomas (WAL)	Did not start		
