= Kelsey Mitchell =

Kelsey Mitchell may refer to:

- Kelsey Mitchell (basketball) (born 1995), American professional basketball player
- Kelsey Mitchell (cyclist) (born 1993), Canadian professional track cyclist
