= 2022 Pan American Track Cycling Championships =

- Venue: Lima, Peru
- Date: 10–14 August
- Events: 22

The 2022 Pan American Track Cycling Championships took place at the National Sports Village (VIDENA) velodrome in Lima, Peru from 10 to 14 August 2022.

== Medal summary ==
=== Men ===
Event	Gold	Silver	Bronze
Sprint	Nicholas Paul; Trinidad and Tobago	Jaïr Tjon En Fa; Suriname	Kevin Quintero; Colombia
Team sprint	Trinidad and Tobago; Kwesi Browne; Nicholas Paul; Zion Pulido	Canada; Ryan Dodyk; Tyler Rorke; Nick Wammes	Colombia; Carlos Echeverri; Juan Ochoa; Kevin Quintero; Santiago Ramírez
Team pursuit	Canada; Evan Burtnik; Chris Ernst; Michael Foley; Sean Richardson	Colombia; Juan Esteban Arango; Jordan Parra; Brayan Sánchez; Juan Pablo Zapata	Mexico; Tomás Aguirre; Edibaldo Maldonado; José Muñiz; Ricardo Peña
Keirin	Nicholas Paul; Trinidad and Tobago	Kevin Quintero; Colombia	Santiago Ramírez; Colombia
Omnium	Dylan Bibic; Canada	Ricardo Peña; Mexico	Ángel Pulgar; Venezuela
Madison	Canada; Dylan Bibic; Michael Foley	Colombia; Juan Esteban Arango; Jordan Parra	Mexico; Fernando Nava; Ricardo Peña
1 km time trial	Santiago Ramírez; Colombia	Cristian Ortega; Colombia	James Hedgcock; Canada
Individual pursuit	Chris Ernst; Canada	Brayan Sánchez; Colombia	Sean Richardson; Canada
Points race	Fábio Pereira; Brazil	Michael Foley; Canada	Jordan Parra; Colombia
Scratch	Grant Koontz; United States	Dylan Bibic; Canada	Akil Campbell; Trinidad and Tobago
Elimination race	Dylan Bibic; Canada	Jordan Parra; Colombia	Eddy Huntsman; United States

=== Women ===
Event	Gold	Silver	Bronze
Sprint	Kelsey Mitchell; Canada	Daniela Gaxiola; Mexico	Yuli Verdugo; Mexico
Team sprint	Canada; Lauriane Genest; Kelsey Mitchell; Sarah Orban	Mexico; Daniela Gaxiola; Jessica Salazar; Yuli Verdugo	Colombia; Martha Bayona; Juliana Gaviria; Marianis Salazar
Team pursuit	Canada; Adèle Desgagnes; Lily Plante; Sarah Van Dam; Ruby West	Mexico; Yareli Acevedo; Nicole Córdova; Maria Gaxiola; Victoria Velasco	United States; Olivia Cummins; Colleen Gulick; Chloe Patrick; Zoe Taperez
Keirin	Kelsey Mitchell; Canada	Lauriane Genest; Canada	Juliana Gaviria; Colombia
Omnium	Sarah Van Dam; Canada	Amber Joseph; Barbados	Victoria Velasco; Mexico
Madison	Canada; Lily Plante; Sarah Van Dam	United States; Colleen Gulick; Zoe Taperez	Brazil; Wellyda dos Santos; Alice Leite
500 m time trial	Martha Bayona; Colombia	Kelsey Mitchell; Canada	Juliana Gaviria; Colombia
Individual pursuit	Adèle Desgagnes; Canada	Teniel Campbell; Trinidad and Tobago	Ruby West; Canada
Points race	Teniel Campbell; Trinidad and Tobago	Amber Joseph; Barbados	Sarah Van Dam; Canada
Scratch	Amber Joseph; Barbados	Colleen Gulick; United States	Sarah Van Dam; Canada
Elimination race	Sarah Van Dam; Canada	Yareli Acevedo; Mexico	Teniel Campbell; Trinidad and Tobago

== Medal table ==
* Host nation (Peru)

Rank	Nation	Gold	Silver	Bronze	Total
1	Canada	13	5	5	23
2	Trinidad and Tobago	4	1	2	7
3	Colombia	2	6	7	15
4	United States	1	2	2	5
5	Barbados	1	2	0	3
6	Brazil	1	0	1	2
7	Mexico	0	5	4	9
8	Suriname	0	1	0	1
9	Venezuela	0	0	1	1
Totals (9 entries)		22	22	22	66
