= Emma Hinze =

German cyclist (born 1997)

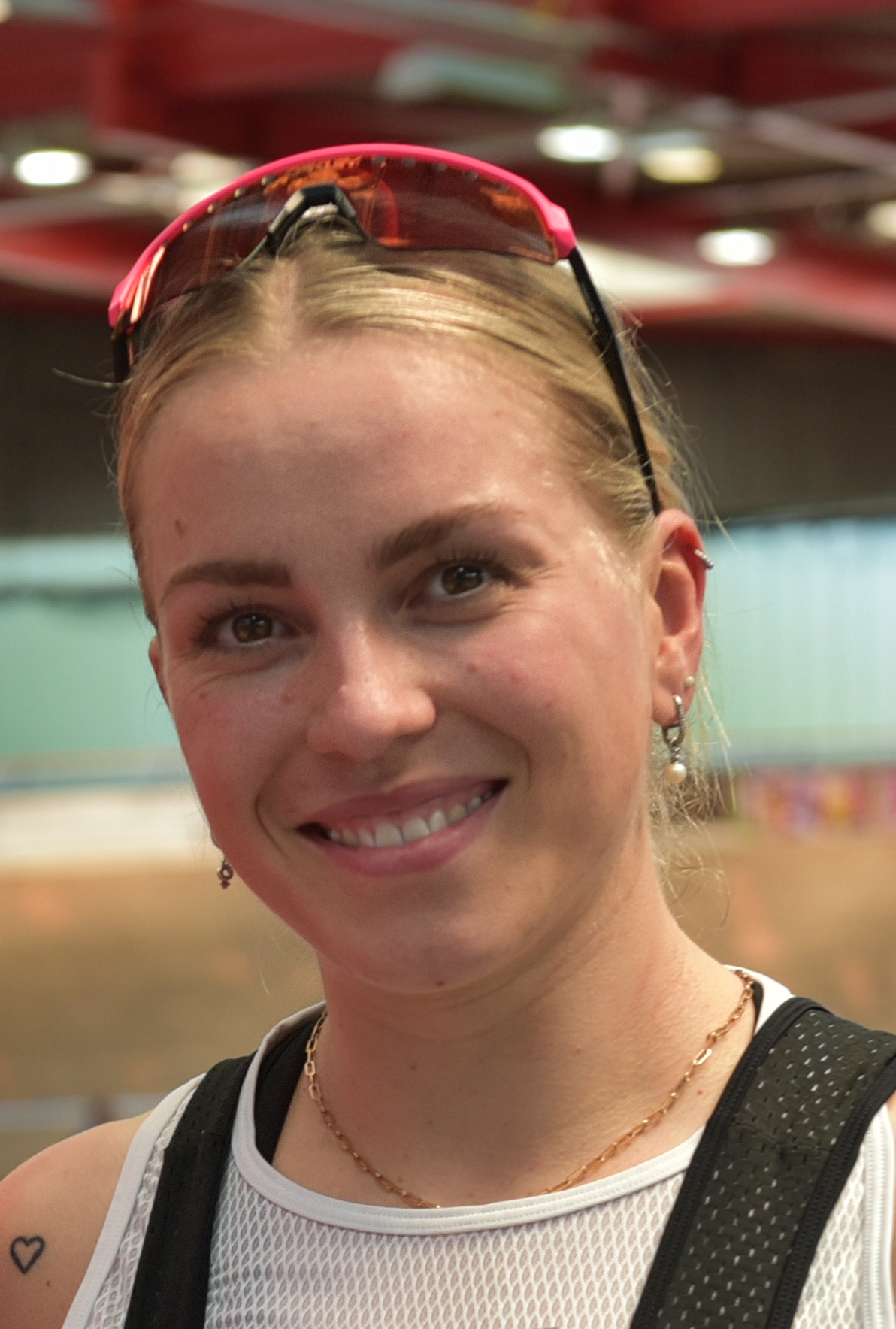
- Hinze in 2022

Personal information
- Born: 17 September 1997 (age 29) Hildesheim, Germany
- Height: 1.68 m (5 ft 6 in)
- Weight: 63 kg (139 lb)

Cycling career
- Sport: Cycling
- Discipline: Track
- Role: Rider
Medal record
Women's track cycling
Representing Germany
Olympic Games
Silver medal – second place	2020 Tokyo	Team sprint
Bronze medal – third place	2024 Paris	Team sprint
World Championships
Gold medal – first place	2020 Berlin	Sprint
Gold medal – first place	2020 Berlin	Keirin
Gold medal – first place	2020 Berlin	Team sprint
Gold medal – first place	2021 Roubaix	Sprint
Gold medal – first place	2021 Roubaix	Team sprint
Gold medal – first place	2022 Saint-Quentin-en-Yvelines	Team sprint
Gold medal – first place	2023 Glasgow	500 m time trial
Gold medal – first place	2023 Glasgow	Team sprint
Silver medal – second place	2022 Saint-Quentin-en-Yvelines	500 m time trial
Bronze medal – third place	2019 Pruszków	Team sprint
Bronze medal – third place	2022 Saint-Quentin-en-Yvelines	Sprint
European Championships
Gold medal – first place	2022 Munich	500 m time trial
Gold medal – first place	2022 Munich	Team sprint
Gold medal – first place	2023 Grenchen	500 m time trial
Gold medal – first place	2023 Grenchen	Team sprint
Gold medal – first place	2024 Apeldoorn	Team sprint
Silver medal – second place	2019 Apeldoorn	Team sprint
Bronze medal – third place	2018 Glasgow	Team sprint
Bronze medal – third place	2023 Grenchen	Keirin
Bronze medal – third place	2024 Apeldoorn	Sprint

Emma Hinze (born 17 September 1997) is a German professional racing cyclist. She competed in the 2016 and 2020 UCI Track Cycling World Championships, winning in individual and team sprint as well as in Keirin. Triple world champion, she was seen as a favourite for the Tokyo Olympics (postponed to 2021 due to the COVID-19 pandemic), but ultimately failed to win an individual medal, falling to eventual gold medal winner Kelsey Mitchell in the semi-finals and the losing the bout for the bronze medal against Lee Wai-sze. With her partner Lea Friedrich, she was more successful in the team sprint, winning silver. For winning the silver medal at Tokyo she was awarded by the President of the Federal Republic of Germany with the Silver Laurel Leaf, Germany's highest sport award.

== Major results ==
2016
3rd Team Sprint, Memorial of Alexander Lesnikov (with Pauline Grabosch)
Grand Prix of Tula

3rd Keirin
3rd Team Sprint (with Pauline Grabosch)

2020
World Championships

1st Keirin
1st Team Sprint
1st Sprint

2021
Tokyo Olympics

2nd Team Sprint (with Lea Friedrich)
4th Sprint
