= Chen Feifei =

Chinese cyclist

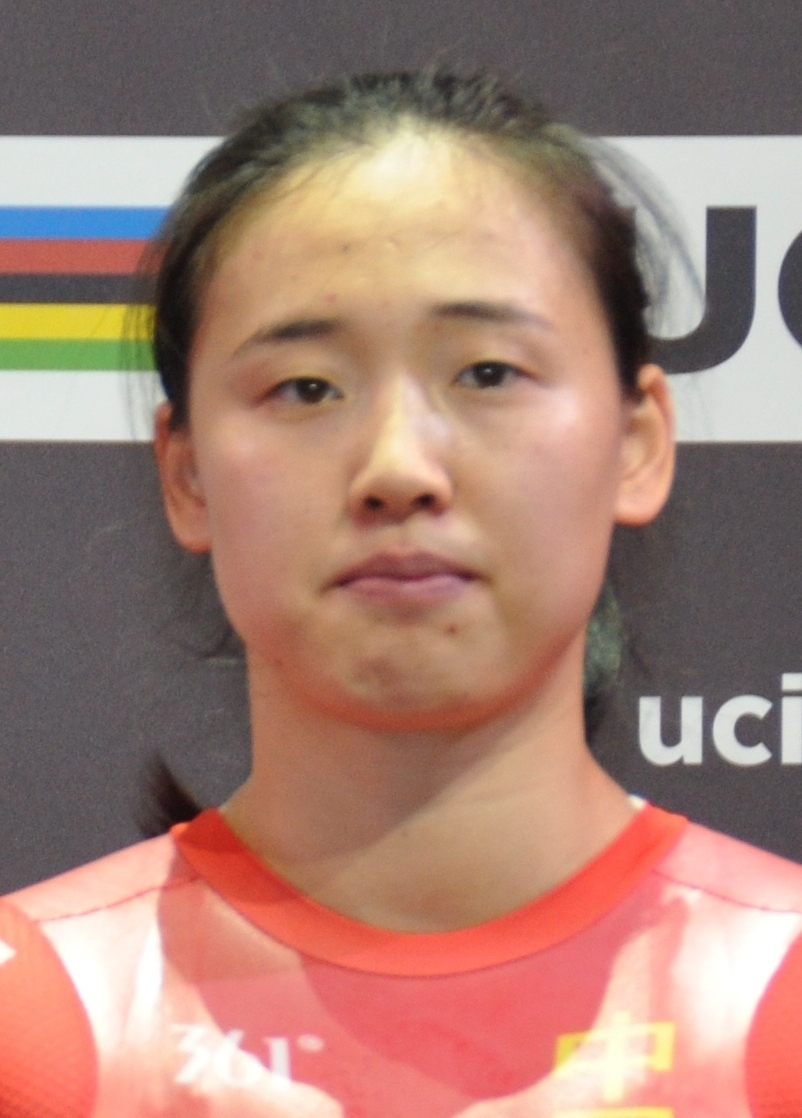
- Chen Feifei in 2020

Personal information
- Born: 15 March 1997 (age 29)

Cycling career
- Sport: Cycling
- Discipline: Track
- Role: Rider
Medal record
World Championships
| Bronze medal – third place | 2020 Berlin | Team sprint |
Asian Championships
| Gold medal – first place | 2020 Jincheon | 500 m time trial |
| Gold medal – first place | 2020 Jincheon | Team sprint |

Chen Feifei (born 15 March 1997) is a Chinese professional racing cyclist. She rode in the women's team sprint event at the 2020 UCI Track Cycling World Championships in Berlin, Germany, winning the bronze medal with Zhong Tianshi.
