= Cycling at the 2019 Pan American Games – Women's team sprint =

Women's team sprint at the 2019 Pan American Games
- Venue: Velodrome
- Dates: August 1
- Competitors: 12 from 6 nations

Medalists
Gold medal	Daniela Gaxiola; Jessica Salazar	Mexico
Silver medal	Kelsey Mitchell; Amelia Walsh	Canada
Bronze medal	Martha Bayona; Juliana Gaviria	Colombia

The women's team sprint competition of the cycling events at the 2019 Pan American Games was held on August 1 at the Velodrome.

== Records ==
Prior to this competition, the existing world and Games records were as follows:

World record	China	32.034	Saint-Quentin-en-Yvelines, Mexico	18 February 2015
Games record	Canada	33.584	Toronto, Canada	16 July 2015

== Schedule ==
Date	Time	Round
August 1, 2019	12:30	Qualification
August 1, 2019	19:07	Finals

== Results ==
=== Qualification ===
Fastest 4 teams advanced to the final.

Rank	Nation	Name	Time	Notes
1	Mexico	Daniela Gaxiola; Jessica Salazar	33.759	QG
2	Canada	Kelsey Mitchell; Amelia Walsh	34.189	QG
3	Colombia	Martha Bayona; Juliana Gaviria	34.437	QB
4	Argentina	Mariana Díaz; Natalia Vera	36.609	QB
5	Ecuador	Katheryne Cargua; Genesis Lozano	37.482	
6	Peru	Ghillma Bendezu; Estephany Valdivia	38.830	

=== Finals ===
The final classification is determined in the medal finals.

Rank	Nation	Name	Time	Notes
Gold medal final
1st place, gold medalist(s)	Mexico	Daniela Gaxiola; Jessica Salazar	33.424	GR
2nd place, silver medalist(s)	Canada	Kelsey Mitchell; Amelia Walsh	34.096	
Bronze medal final
3rd place, bronze medalist(s)	Colombia	Martha Bayona; Juliana Gaviria	34.313	
4	Argentina	Mariana Díaz; Natalia Vera	35.983	
