= Milly Tanner =

British cyclist (born 1999)

Personal information
- Born: 10 January 1999 (age 27) Exeter, England

Cycling career
- Sport: Cycling
- Current team: Slingshot
- Discipline: Track
- Role: Rider
- Rider type: Sprinter
Medal record
Women's track cycling
Representing Great Britain
World Championships
Bronze medal – third place	2021 Roubaix	Team sprint
European Championships
Silver medal – second place	2020 Plovdiv	Team sprint
U23 & Junior European Championships
Bronze medal – third place	2018 Aigle	U23 500m time trial
Bronze medal – third place	2018 Aigle	U23 Team sprint
Bronze medal – third place	2019 Ghent	U23 Team sprint

Millicent (Milly) Tanner (born 10 January 1999) is a retired English international track cyclist.

== Personal ==
Tanner attended Millfield School.

== Cycling career ==
Tanner became a British team champion after winning the National Team Sprint Championships at the 2020 British National Track Championships with Blaine Ridge-Davis. She had previously finished second in 2019.

In 2021, Tanner won team sprint bronze at the UCI Track World Championships in Roubaix, France.

At the 2023 British Cycling National Track Championships, she won her second national title, by winning the team sprint again. The following year in 2024, she won a third team sprint title, at the 2024 British Cycling National Track Championships.

== Major wins ==
2020
National Track Championships

1st Team sprint

2023
National Track Championships

1st Team sprint

2024
National Track Championships

1st Team sprint
