= Amelia Walsh =

Canadian cyclist (born 1992)

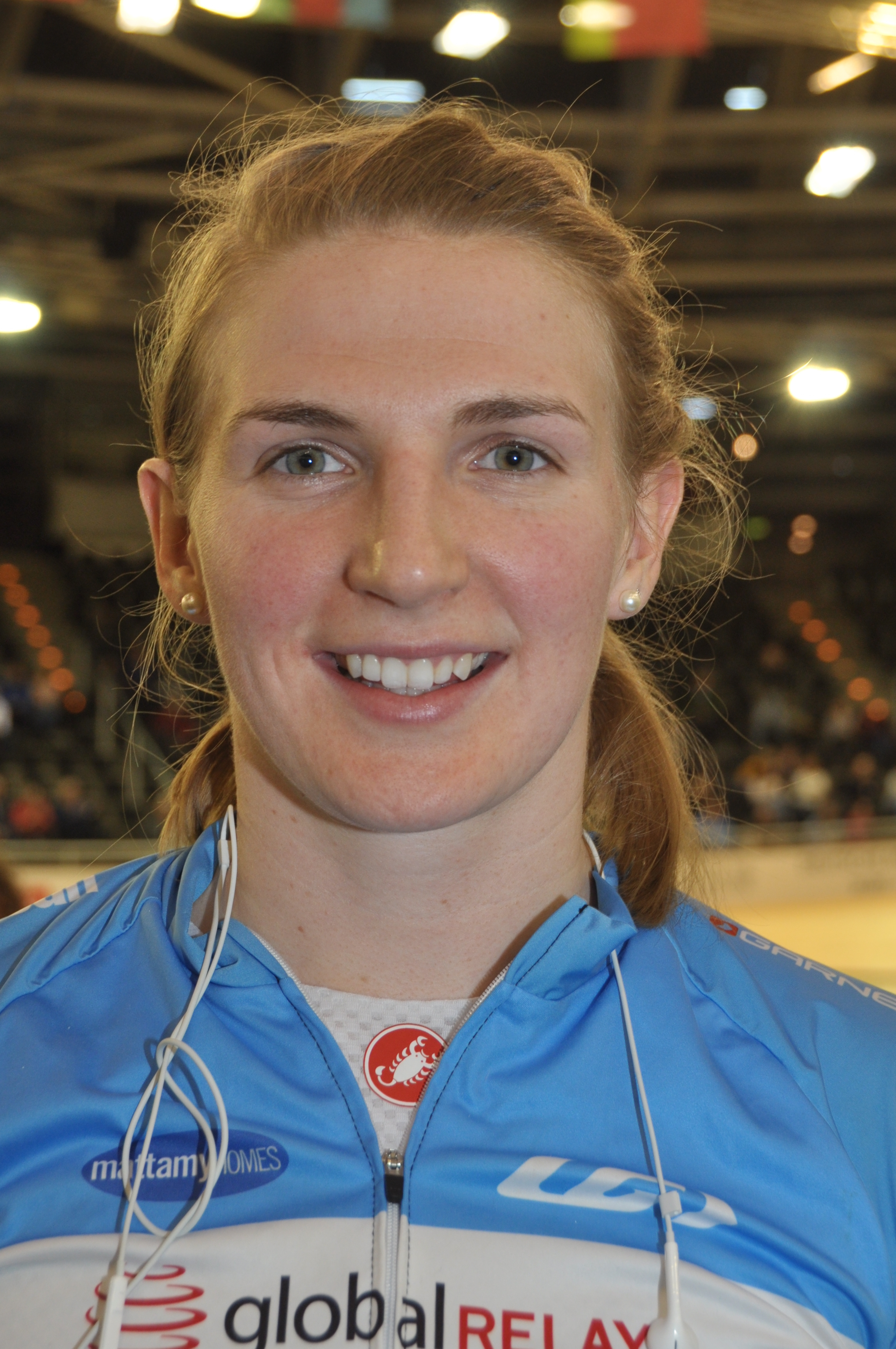
- Amelia Walsh (2018)

Personal information
- Born: 2 August 1992 (age 34)
- Height: 170 cm (5 ft 7 in)
- Weight: 67 kg (148 lb)

Cycling career
- Sport: Cycling
- Disciplines: Track cycling, BMX racing
- Role: Rider
Medal record
Women's track cycling
Pan American Games
Silver medal – second place	2019 Lima	Team sprint
Pan American Championships
Silver medal – second place	2017 Couva	Team sprint
Bronze medal – third place	2018 Aguascalientes	Keirin
Bronze medal – third place	2018 Aguascalientes	Team sprint

Amelia Walsh (born 2 August 1992) is a Canadian cyclist. She started as a BMX rider at age 15. She won several provincial championships before she began representing her nation at international competitions. She competed in the UCI BMX World Championships in 2012, 2013, 2014 and 2015. Prior to that she competed in the 2009 World Junior Championships. She was the Canadian BMX Women's Champion title holder in 2013, 2014 and 2015.

== Career ==
=== Track cycling ===
Walsh switched to compete in track cycling after the 2016 BMX season and together with teammate Kate O'Brien captured a silver medal in the 2017 World Cup event in Los Angeles in team sprint. She competed for Canada at the 2018 Commonwealth Games.
