= Sophie Capewell =

British cyclist (born 1998)

Sophie Capewell MBE
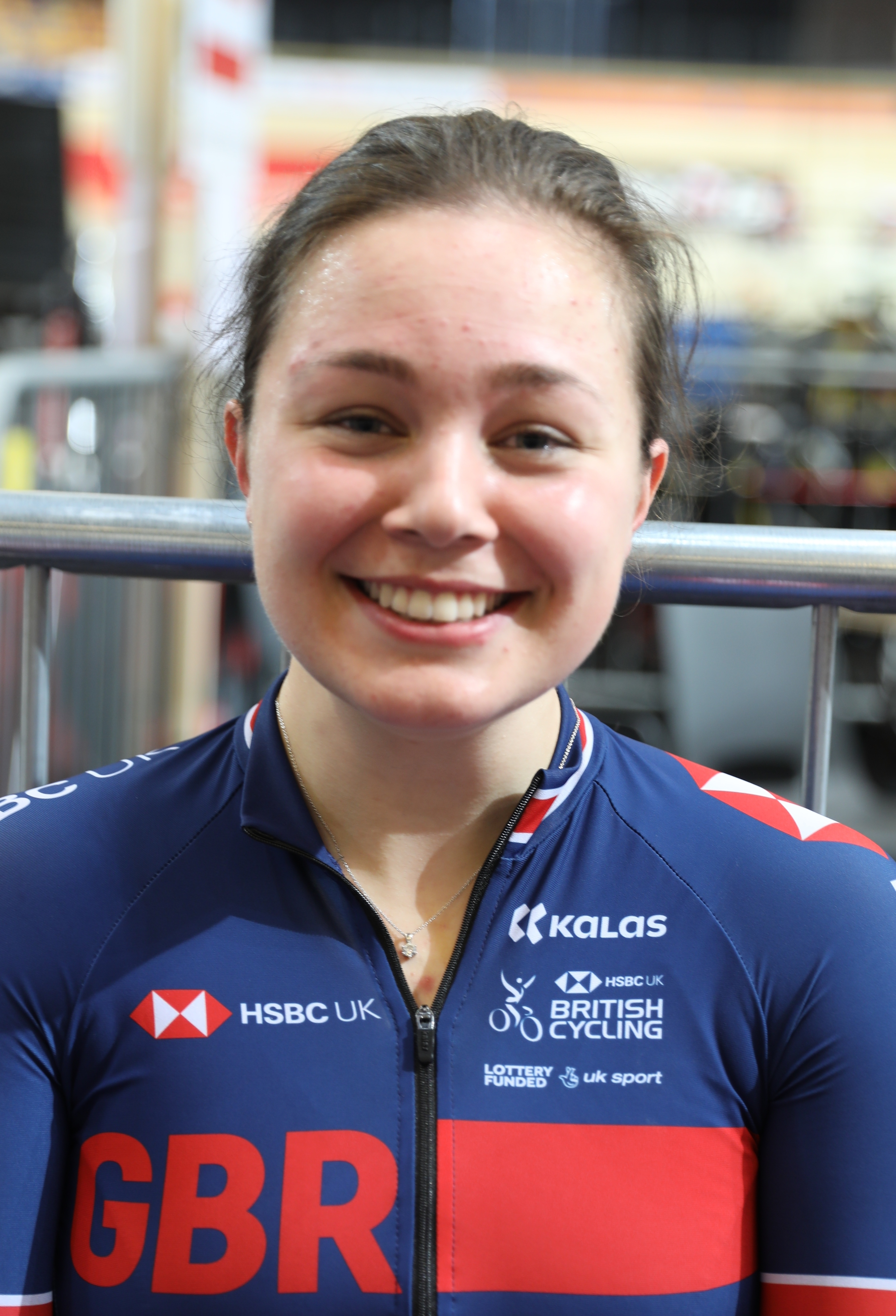
- Capewell in 2019

Personal information
- Born: Sophie Ellen Capewell; 4 September 1998 (age 28) Lichfield, England
- Height: 1.69 m (5 ft 7 in)
- Weight: 78 kg (172 lb)

Cycling career
- Sport: Cycling
- Discipline: Track
- Role: Rider
Medal record
Women's track cycling
Representing Great Britain
Olympic Games
Gold medal – first place	2024 Paris	Team sprint
World Championships
Gold medal – first place	2024 Ballerup	Team sprint
Silver medal – second place	2023 Glasgow	Team sprint
Silver medal – second place	2024 Ballerup	500 m time trial
Silver medal – second place	2026 Shanghai	Team sprint
Bronze medal – third place	2021 Roubaix	Team sprint
Bronze medal – third place	2022 Saint-Quentin-en-Yvelines	Team sprint
European Championships
Silver medal – second place	2023 Grenchen	Team sprint
Silver medal – second place	2024 Apeldoorn	Team sprint
Silver medal – second place	2026 Konya	Sprint
Silver medal – second place	2026 Konya	Team sprint
Bronze medal – third place	2023 Grenchen	Sprint
Representing England
Commonwealth Games
Silver medal – second place	2022 Birmingham	Keirin
Silver medal – second place	2026 Glasgow	Team sprint
Silver medal – second place	2026 Glasgow	Sprint
Bronze medal – third place	2022 Birmingham	500m time trial

Sophie Ellen Capewell (born 4 September 1998) is a British professional racing cyclist. She won a gold medal at the 2024 Summer Olympics in the team sprint. She was also a member of the British team who became world champions in the team sprint at the 2024 UCI Track Cycling World Championships.

== Early life ==
Capewell grew up in Staffordshire, England. Her father, Nigel Capewell, represented Great Britain in cycling at the 1996 Atlanta and 2000 Sydney Paralympic Games. She attended Nether Stowe School. Her mother was also a keen cyclist and won a world title at Masters level in 2024. Her father worked as a coach at Lichfield City Cycling Club, and during her childhood, she trained there. At the age of 13, she joined the Great Britain Cycling Team Academy.

== Career ==
Capewell competed in the women's sprint at the 2020 UCI Track Cycling World Championships in Berlin. She won bronze in the team sprint at the 2021 UCI Track Cycling World Championships in Roubaix, France. Riding with Milly Tanner, Blaine Ridge-Davis and Lauren Bate, they overcame Japan to become the first British riders to win a world championship medal in the women's team sprint since 2014.

Capewell was selected by England for the 2022 Commonwealth Games. She lost the bronze medal race of the women's sprint to Emma Finucane of Wales, finishing fourth overall. The following day, she claimed bronze in the 500m time trial. She subsequently won a silver medal in the keirin, which she dedicated to her late father Nigel, who died in October 2021. At the 2022 UEC European Track Championships in Munich, Capewell and Finucane crashed out of the team sprint after inadvertently touching wheels during the race.

At the 2023 Track Nations Cup, Capewell won a bronze medal in the team sprint in Jakarta, and a silver medal in the sprint at the meet in Cairo. She was beaten in the final by Finucane.

Capewell, Tanner and Georgette Rand secured victory in the team sprint at the 2024 British Cycling National Track Championships. At the 2024 Track Nations Cup, Capewell, Finucane and Katy Marchant won back-to-back gold medals in the team sprint at Adelaide and Hong Kong. At the 2024 Summer Olympics, Capewell, Finucane and Marchant, won the gold medal in the team sprint. The trio broke the world record three times during the event, ultimately setting the new record at 45.186 seconds in the final against New Zealand. Their medal was the first of any colour in the event for Team GB at an Olympics.

At the 2024 UCI Track Cycling World Championships in Ballerup, Denmark, Capewell again teamed with Finucane and Marchant to win gold in the team sprint. They beat the Netherlands by over half a second in the final to earn Team GB's first world title in the women's sprint since 2008. In the sprint, she was defeated by Japan's Mina Sato in the bronze medal race to finish fourth overall.

Capewell suffered from a lingering ankle injury, which was attributed to burnout and over-training.

At the 2026 European Championships in Konya, Capewell was a member of the British trio who were defeated by Germany in the final of the team sprint. In the sprint, she ended with a silver medal after being defeated by Finucane in the final.

Having been selected by England for the 2026 Commonwealth Games in Glasgow, Capewell won silver in the team sprint alongside Marchant and Rhianna Parris-Smith. The trio were defeated by the Welsh team in the gold medal race. One day later, she advanced to the final of the sprint and won a second silver of the Games, after she was beaten by Finucane.

At the 2026 UCI Track Cycling World Championships in Shanghai, Capewell, Finucane and Parris-Smith ended with a silver medal in the team sprint, after being defeated by China in the final. Capewell was hindered after her saddle snapped during the race. She finished fourth in the sprint, missing out on a bronze medal by 0.001 seconds to Sato.

== Honours ==
Capewell was appointed Member of the Order of the British Empire (MBE) in the 2025 New Year Honours for services to cycling. In 2026, she was awarded the Freedom of the City of Lichfield.

== Major results ==
2017
National Track Championships

1st Team sprint (with Lauren Bate)
1st Keirin
3rd Sprint

2018
National Track Championships

2nd Sprint
3rd Team sprint (with Blaine Ridge-Davis)
3rd Keirin

2019
National Track Championships

1st Sprint
2nd Team sprint (with Milly Tanner)

2021
UCI World Championships

3rd Team sprint

2022
Commonwealth Games

2nd Keirin
3rd 500 m time trial

UCI World Championships

3rd Team sprint

National Track Championships

2nd Team sprint (with Blaine Ridge-Davis and Milly Tanner)
2nd Sprint
3rd Keirin

2023
2023 Track Nations Cup

3rd Team Sprint, Jakarta (with Emma Finucane and Lauren Bell)
2nd Sprint, Cairo

UCI World Championships

2nd Team sprint

UEC European Championships

2nd Team sprint
3rd Sprint

National Track Championships

2nd Team sprint (with Blaine Ridge-Davis and Lowri Thomas)
2nd Sprint
2nd Individual time trial
3rd Keirin

2024
National Track Championships

1st Team sprint (with Milly Tanner and Georgette Rand)

UCI Track Cycling Nations Cup

1st Team Sprint, Adelaide (with Katy Marchant and Emma Finucane)
1st Team sprint, Hong Kong (with Katy Marchant and Emma Finucane)

Olympic Games

1st Team sprint (with Emma Finucane and Katy Marchant)

UCI World Championships

1st Team sprint (with Emma Finucane and Katy Marchant)
2nd 500 m time trial

UEC European Championships

2nd Team sprint

2026
UEC European Championships

2nd Team sprint
2nd Sprint

2026 Commonwealth Games

2nd Team sprint (with Katy Marchant and Rhianna Parris-Smith)
2nd Sprint

UCI Track Cycling World Championships

2nd Team Sprint (with Emma Finucane and Rhianna Parris-Smith)
