= Kelsey Mitchell (cyclist) =

Canadian cyclist & bobsledder (born 1993)

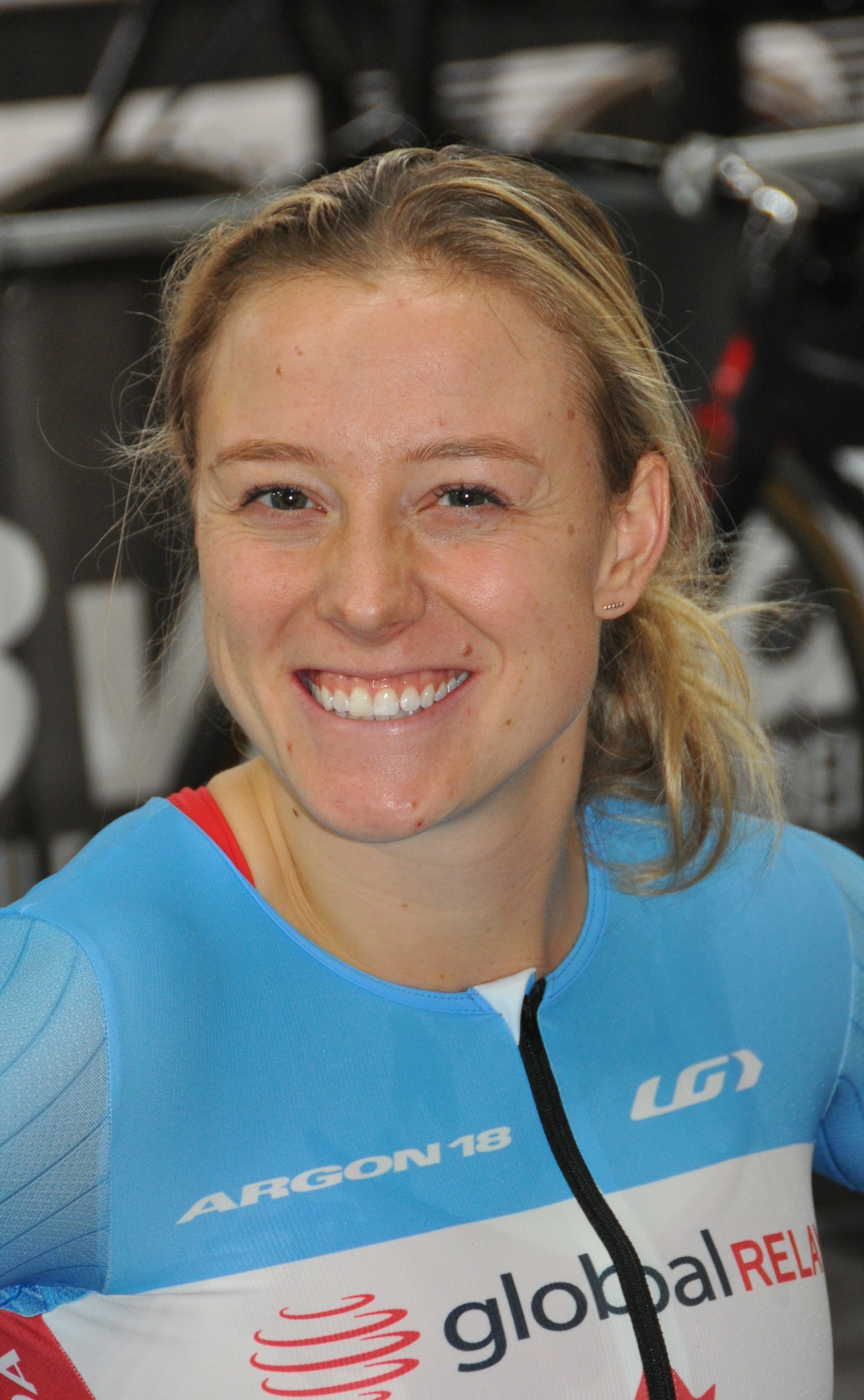
- Mitchell in 2020

Personal information
- Full name: Kelsey Marie Mitchell
- Born: November 26, 1993 (age 32) Brandon, Manitoba, Canada
- Height: 174 cm (5 ft 9 in)
- Weight: 70 kg (154 lb)

Cycling career
- Sport: Cycling
- Discipline: Track
- Role: Rider
Medal record
Women's track cycling
Representing Canada
Olympic Games
Gold medal – first place	2020 Tokyo	Sprint
World Championships
Bronze medal – third place	2021 Roubaix	Sprint
Commonwealth Games
Silver medal – second place	2022 Birmingham	Team sprint
Silver medal – second place	2022 Birmingham	Sprint
Silver medal – second place	2022 Birmingham	500 m time trial
Bronze medal – third place	2022 Birmingham	Keirin
Pan American Games
Gold medal – first place	2019 Lima	Sprint
Silver medal – second place	2019 Lima	Team sprint
Pan American Championships
Gold medal – first place	2019 Cochabamba	Sprint
Gold medal – first place	2019 Cochabamba	Team sprint
Gold medal – first place	2022 Lima	Keirin
Gold medal – first place	2022 Lima	Sprint
Gold medal – first place	2022 Lima	Team sprint
Silver medal – second place	2022 Lima	500 m time trial
Silver medal – second place	2024 Carson	Sprint
Silver medal – second place	2024 Carson	Team sprint
Bronze medal – third place	2019 Cochabamba	Keirin
Bronze medal – third place	2024 Carson	Keirin

Kelsey Marie Mitchell (born November 26, 1993) is a Canadian professional track cyclist and bobsledder, best known for her performances in the sprint cycling event. Notable as a relative latecomer to cycling after commencing training at age 23, Mitchell is the 2020 Olympic champion, 2021 World bronze medallist, and 2019 Pan American Games champion in the individual sprint, as well as a five-time Pan American Track Cycling Championships gold medallist. She will represent Canada in the bobsled at the 2026 Winter Olympics.

== Career ==
=== Early life and career ===
Mitchell was born in Brandon, Manitoba, Canada. She was raised in Fort McMurray, Alberta, from 1998 until 2008, at which point her family moved to Edmonton. She attended Salisbury Composite High School in Sherwood Park and graduated in 2011.

Mitchell played several different sports in her early life, including gymnastics, ringette, soccer, and basketball. She later characterized herself as "never technically strong in any of the sports but I had the athleticism." She attended both the Northern Alberta Institute of Technology and University of Alberta in Edmonton, and played varsity soccer while there. Upon her graduation in 2017 at age 23, Mitchell felt that "a lot of people when they finish decide to move on in their life and be done with sports. I did not have that feeling at all. I knew it wasn't the end for me." She participated in RBC Training Ground, an athlete funding and talent identification program, which steered her into track cycling. At the time, she did not own a bicycle. Despite having only commenced training the previous December, she won the women's sprint title at the 2018 Canadian championships.

=== 2019–2021 ===
2019 was a breakout international season for Mitchell, with notable results accruing first at the 2019 Pan American Games in Lima. She won gold in the women's sprint, defeating silver medallist Martha Bayona of Colombia with a 11.449 second time. Mitchell was also part of the silver medal-winning Canadian team in the team sprint event, and finished fifth in the keirin. A month later at the 2019 Pan American Track Cycling Championships in Cochabamba, Mitchell won gold in the sprint and the team sprint, and a bronze medal in the keirin. In the process she set a new world record in the 200 m track sprint with a time of 10.154 seconds. Mitchell's individual and team results in Cochabamba qualified her to make her World Championship debut at the 2020 edition in Berlin. There, Mitchell and Lauriane Genest were eliminated in the first round of the team sprint and she also did not advance in the keirin, but she finished fourth in the sprint.

Mitchell's results were intended as a ramp-up to the 2020 Summer Olympics in Tokyo, but shortly after the 2020 World Championships, the entire cycling calendar was disrupted by the onset of the COVID-19 pandemic. Ultimately, the Olympics were delayed by a full year. Mitchell's training was relatively unaffected by the pandemic, as she and her teammates were able to continue on in Milton, Ontario, but they were unable to compete at any leadup events. She would later say the delay may have been "a blessing in disguise" due to the additional preparation time. When the time came, she was named to her first Olympic team. After placing fifth in the keirin, Mitchell won the gold medal in the sprint on the final day of the Tokyo Games, best silver medallist Olena Starikova by two laps to zero. Hers was the twenty-fourth Canadian medal of the Games, and the seventh gold medal, the latter equalling the nation's previous non-boycotted gold medal count from 1992. She was the second Canadian to win the event, after Lori-Ann Muenzer. Mitchell next competed at the World Championships in Roubaix, winning a bronze medal in the sprint over teammate Genest. This was the first World medal for Canada in sprint since Muenzer's bronze in 2004. Mitchell was fifth in the keirin, and with Genest and Sarah Orban was eliminated in the first round of the team sprint. Mitchell finished the season on the newly established UCI Track Champions League circuit, coming third overall across the four sprint events.

=== 2022–2024 ===
Beginning the 2022 season on the Nations Cup circuit, Mitchell claimed gold medals in Glasgow and Milton. She was named to the Canadian team for the 2022 Commonwealth Games in Birmingham, and noted that the 2018 Games had been an early inspiration to her when she was beginning to train. On the first day of the competition, Mitchell, Genest and Orban won the silver medal in the team sprint, the first Canadian medal of the Games. The following day, Mitchell won a second silver medal in the sprint, losing in the final to New Zealander Ellesse Andrews. She remarked afterwards that she had "came up a little bit short, but gave it my all. I'm happy to walk away with a silver." A third consecutive silver medal was then won in the 500 m time trial. Mitchell concluded the Commonwealth cycling program with a bronze medal in the women's keirin event. Weeks later at the 2022 Pan American Track Cycling Championships in Lima, Mitchell put in a dominant performance, winning gold medals in individual sprint, team sprint, and keirin, and taking the silver in the time trial event.

At the 2022 UCI Track Champions League, Berlin, she won a gold medal in keirin.

Mitchell competed in the women's sprint, team sprint, and keirin at the 2024 Summer Olympics in Paris, her second Olympic appearance. Although she was the defending champion in the women's sprint, she only advanced to the quarterfinals, placing eighth. Feeling burnt out following the Olympic Games, Mitchell briefly tried speed skating. She said: "I knew I wasn't done being an athlete, but I also knew I needed some time away from the bike."

=== 2025–present ===
In the summer of 2025, Mitchell switched to training bobsleigh. She races bobsleigh as the brakeman, with pilot Melissa Lotholz. In January 2026, during the Olympic qualifying process, Mitchell and Lotholz placed eighth at the Bobsleigh World Cup stop in St. Moritz.

Mitchell was named to the Canadian Olympic bobsled team later that January. With her participation in the 2026 Winter Olympics, Mitchell will become one of 14 Canadians to compete in both Summer and Winter Olympics. She hopes to return to cycling for the 2028 Summer Olympics.
