= Kristina Clonan =

Australian cyclist (born 1998)

Kristina Clonan OLY
Personal information
- Born: 13 April 1998 (age 28)

Cycling career
- Sport: Cycling
- Disciplines: Road and track
- Role: Rider
- Rider type: Track Sprinting

Professional teams
- 2017: High5 Dream Team
- 2018-: TIS Racing
Medal record
Women's track cycling
Representing Australia
World Championships
Silver medal – second place	2023 Glasgow	500 m time trial
Bronze medal – third place	2024 Ballerup	Team sprint
Commonwealth Games
Gold medal – first place	2022 Birmingham	500m time trial

Kristina Clonan (born 13 April 1998) is an Australian professional racing cyclist. She rode in the women's scratch event at the 2017 UCI Track Cycling World Championships.

== Major results ==
2015
Oceania Junior Road Championships

1st Road Race
3rd Time Trial

2017
1st 120th Austral Wheel Race
1st Omnium, ITS Melbourne - Hisense Grand Prix
National Track Championships

1st Madison (with Macey Stewart)
2nd Team Pursuit

2nd Omnium, ITS Melbourne - DISC Grand Prix

2018
Australian National Road Championships

1st U23 Criterium
3rd U23 Road Race

2022
1st 500m time trial, Commonwealth Games

2023
2nd 500m time trial, UCI World Championships

2024
3rd Team sprint (with Molly McGill and Alessia McCaig), UCI World Championships
