= Blaine Ridge-Davis =

British cyclist (born 1999)

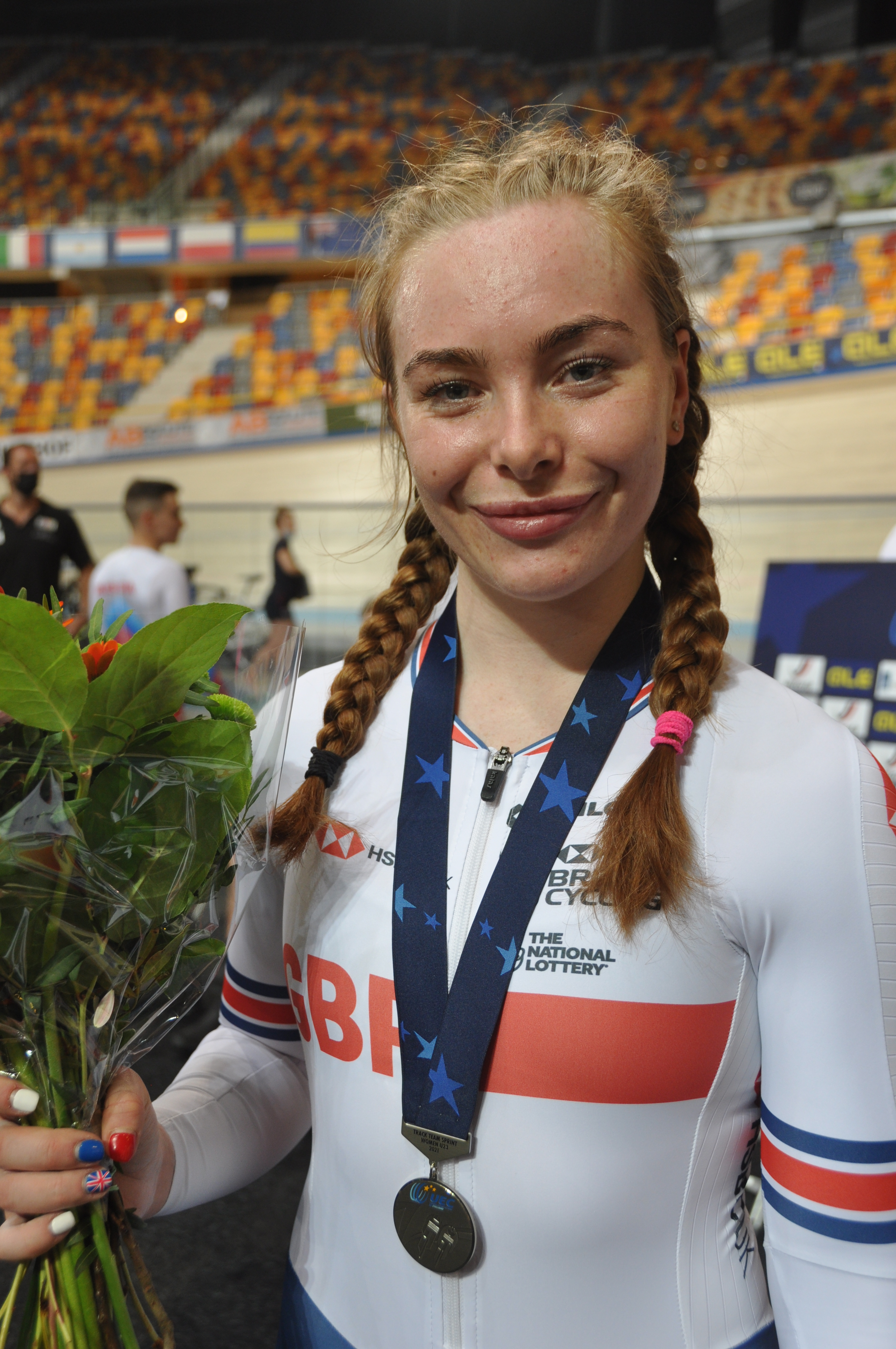
- Blaine Ridge-Davis (2021)

Personal information
- Born: 7 May 1999 (age 27)

Cycling career
- Sport: Cycling
- Current team: Slingshot
- Discipline: Track
- Role: Rider
- Rider type: Sprinter
Medal record
Women's track cycling
Representing Great Britain
World Championships
Bronze medal – third place	2021 Roubaix	Team sprint
European Championships
Silver medal – second place	2020 Plovdiv	Team sprint
U23 & Junior European Championships
Bronze medal – third place	2019 Ghent	U23 Team sprint

Blaine Ridge-Davis (born 7 May 1999) is a British track cyclist and BMX cyclist.

== Cycling career ==
Ridge-Davis is a double British team champion after winning the team sprint Championship at the 2019 British National Track Championships and 2020 British National Track Championships.

As part of a British quartet including Milly Tanner, Sophie Capewell and Lauren Bate, Ridge-Davis won team sprint bronze at the UCI Track World Championships in Roubaix, France.
