= Russian Cycling Federation =

National governing body of cycle racing in Russia

The Russian Cycling Federation or ФВСР (Russian: Федерация велосипедного спорта России, romanized: Federatsiya velosipednogo sporta Rossii) is the national governing body of cycle racing in Russia. Its headquarters are located in Moscow. The President is Oleg Sienko, who was elected on 27 May 2026 The Russian Cycling Federation is a member of the UCI and the UEC.

After the 2022 Russian invasion of Ukraine, the UCI forbade Russian teams from competing in international events. It also stripped Russia of scheduled events. The UEC announced that Russian officials will not be able to officiate at any UEC event, or attend or take part in any UEC meeting, committee, or forum.

In November 2023, former Federation cyclist Mikhail Iakovlev received clearance from the International Olympic Committee to represent Israel at the 2024 Summer Olympics. The coach of the Russian national track cycling team Sergey Kovpanets said that "It is a shame that we lose such a talented rider like Mikhail."
