= Daniela Gaxiola =

Mexican cyclist (born 1992)

Daniela Gaxiola OLY
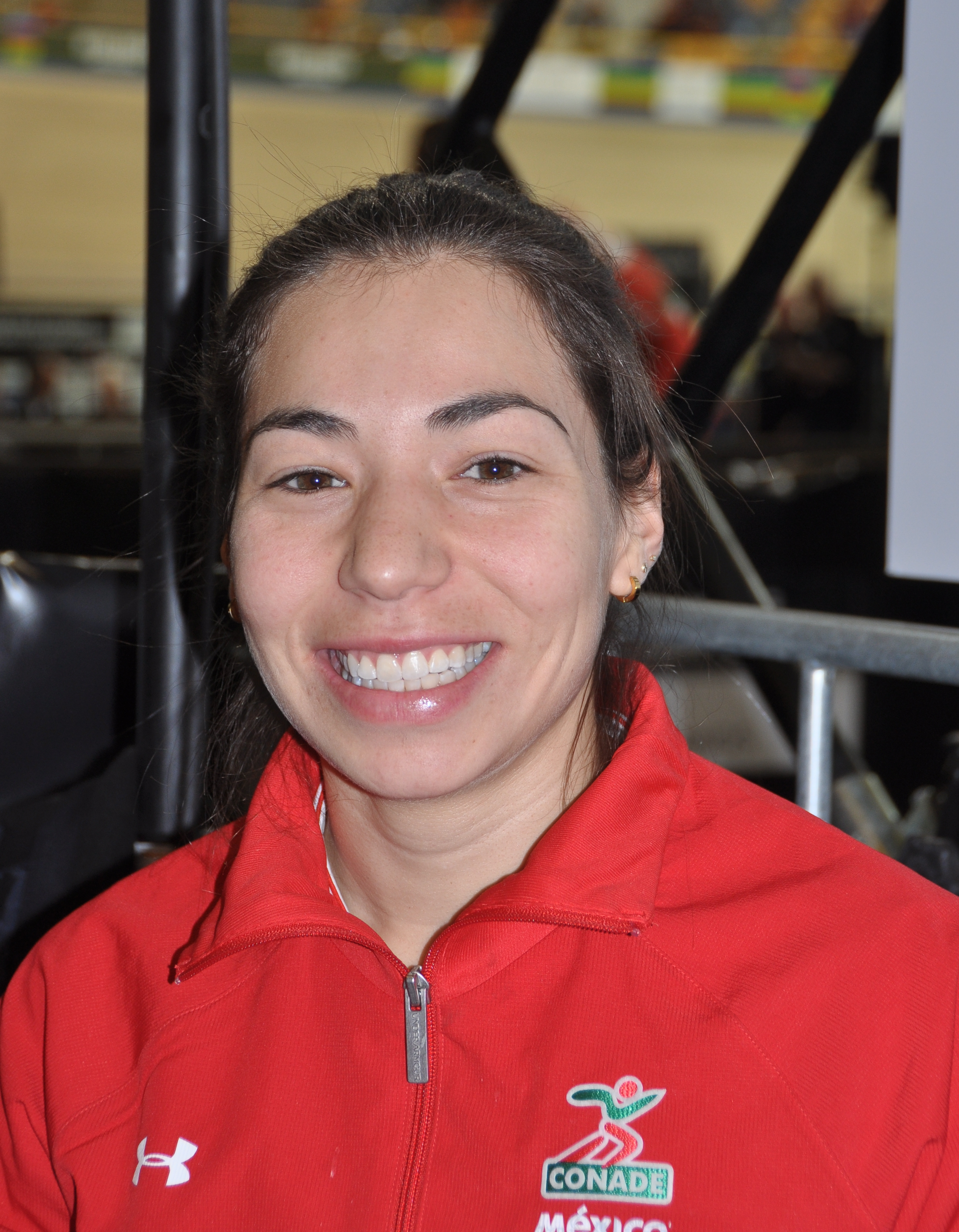
- Gaxiola in 2018

Personal information
- Full name: Luz Daniela Gaxiola González
- Born: 25 November 1992 (age 33) Culiacán, Sinaloa, Mexico

Cycling career
- Sport: Cycling
- Discipline: Track cycling
Medal record
Women's track cycling
Representing Mexico
Pan American Games
Gold medal – first place	2019 Lima	Team sprint
Gold medal – first place	2023 Santiago	Team sprint
Silver medal – second place	2011 Guadalajara	Keirin
Silver medal – second place	2023 Santiago	Keirin
Bronze medal – third place	2011 Guadalajara	Team sprint
Bronze medal – third place	2019 Lima	Sprint
Pan American Championships
Gold medal – first place	2015 Santiago	Team sprint
Gold medal – first place	2016 Aguascalientes	Keirin
Gold medal – first place	2017 Couva	Sprint
Gold medal – first place	2018 Aguascalientes	Sprint
Gold medal – first place	2018 Aguascalientes	Team sprint
Gold medal – first place	2023 San Juan	Team sprint
Gold medal – first place	2024 Carson	Sprint
Gold medal – first place	2024 Carson	Team sprint
Gold medal – first place	2026 Santiago	Team sprint
Silver medal – second place	2012 Mar del Plata	Keirin
Silver medal – second place	2018 Aguascalientes	500 m time trial
Silver medal – second place	2019 Cochabamba	Team sprint
Silver medal – second place	2022 Lima	Sprint
Silver medal – second place	2022 Lima	Team sprint
Silver medal – second place	2023 San Juan	Sprint
Silver medal – second place	2024 Carson	Keirin
Silver medal – second place	2026 Santiago	1 km time trial
Bronze medal – third place	2010 Aguascalientes	Team sprint
Bronze medal – third place	2012 Mar del Plata	Sprint
Bronze medal – third place	2016 Aguascalientes	Sprint
Bronze medal – third place	2017 Couva	Keirin
Bronze medal – third place	2019 Cochabamba	500 m time trial
Bronze medal – third place	2023 San Juan	Keirin
Central American and Caribbean Games
Gold medal – first place	2023 San Salvador	Sprint
Gold medal – first place	2023 San Salvador	Team sprint
Gold medal – first place	2026 Santo Domingo	Keirin
Gold medal – first place	2026 Santo Domingo	Team sprint
Silver medal – second place	2014 Veracruz	500 m time trial
Silver medal – second place	2014 Veracruz	Team sprint
Silver medal – second place	2018 Barranquilla	Keirin
Silver medal – second place	2018 Barranquilla	500 m time trial
Silver medal – second place	2026 Santo Domingo	Sprint
Bronze medal – third place	2010 Mayagüez	Team sprint
Bronze medal – third place	2014 Veracruz	Keirin
Bronze medal – third place	2014 Veracruz	Sprint

Luz Daniela Gaxiola González (born 25 November 1992) is a track cyclist from Mexico. She represented her nation at the 2011, 2013, 2014 and 2015 UCI Track Cycling World Championships.

== Career results ==
2013
Copa Internacional de Pista

1st Keirin
2nd Team Sprint (with Frany Maria Fong Echevarria)
3rd Sprint
3rd 500m Time Trial

Copa Cuba de Pista

2nd Sprint
2nd Team Sprint (with Frany Maria Fong Echevarria)
2nd 500m Time Trial
3rd Keirin

2014
Grand Prix of Colorado Spring

1st Team Sprint (with Frany Maria Fong Echevarria)
2nd Keirin
2nd Sprint

Copa Guatemala de Ciclismo de Pista

1st Keirin
1st Sprint
1st Team Sprint (with Frany Maria Fong Echevarria)
1st 500m Time Trial
2nd Scratch Race

Copa Internacional de Pista

1st 500m Time Trial
1st Team Sprint (with Frany Maria Fong Echevarria)
2nd Keirin
2nd Sprint

Prova Internacional de Anadia

1st Keirin
1st Sprint

Central American and Caribbean Games

2nd Team Sprint (with Frany Maria Fong Echevarria)
2nd 500m Time Trial
3rd Keirin
3rd Sprint

2015
Copa Cuba de Pista

3rd Sprint
3rd Team Sprint (with Frany Maria Fong Echevarria)

2016
Pan American Track Championships

1st Keirin
3rd Sprint

Copa Guatemala de Ciclismo de Pista

1st Keirin
1st Sprint
1st 500m Time Trial
2nd Omnium
3rd Points Race

2017
3rd Keirin, Keirin Cup / Madison Cup
