= Jessica Salazar =

Mexican cyclist (born 1995)

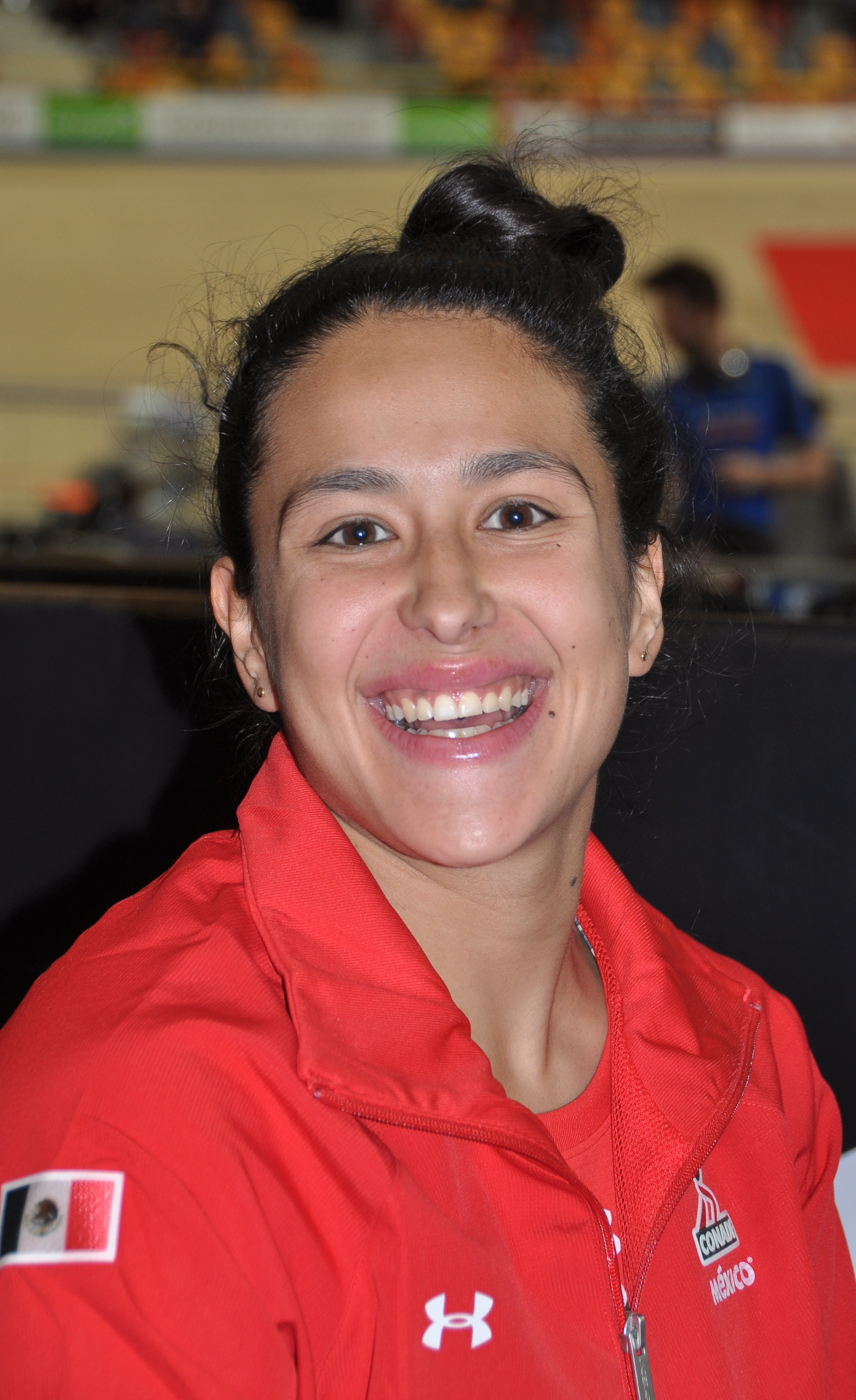
- Salazar in 2018

Personal information
- Full name: Jessica Salazar Valles
- Born: 21 September 1995 (age 31) Guadalajara, Mexico

Cycling career
- Sport: Cycling
- Discipline: Track
- Role: Rider
Medal record
Women's track cycling
Representing Mexico
World Championships
| Silver medal – second place | 2020 Berlin | 500 m time trial |
Pan American Games
| Gold medal – first place | 2019 Lima | Team sprint |
| Gold medal – first place | 2023 Santiago | Team sprint |
Pan American Championships
| Gold medal – first place | 2015 Santiago | Sprint |
| Gold medal – first place | 2015 Santiago | 500 m time trial |
| Gold medal – first place | 2015 Santiago | Team sprint |
| Gold medal – first place | 2016 Aguascalientes | Sprint |
| Gold medal – first place | 2016 Aguascalientes | 500 m time trial |
| Gold medal – first place | 2016 Aguascalientes | Team sprint |
| Gold medal – first place | 2017 Couva | 500 m time trial |
| Gold medal – first place | 2018 Aguascalientes | 500 m time trial |
| Gold medal – first place | 2018 Aguascalientes | Team sprint |
| Gold medal – first place | 2019 Cochabamba | 500 m time trial |
| Gold medal – first place | 2023 San Juan | Team sprint |
| Gold medal – first place | 2023 San Juan | Madison |
| Gold medal – first place | 2024 Carson | Team sprint |
| Silver medal – second place | 2018 Aguascalientes | Sprint |
| Silver medal – second place | 2019 Cochabamba | Team sprint |
| Silver medal – second place | 2022 Lima | Team sprint |
| Silver medal – second place | 2023 San Juan | Team pursuit |
| Silver medal – second place | 2024 Carson | 500 m time trial |
| Bronze medal – third place | 2015 Santiago | Keirin |
| Bronze medal – third place | 2023 San Juan | 500 m time trial |
Central American and Caribbean Games
| Gold medal – first place | 2018 Barranquilla | Keirin |
| Gold medal – first place | 2018 Barranquilla | Sprint |
| Gold medal – first place | 2018 Barranquilla | 500 m time trial |
| Gold medal – first place | 2023 San Salvador | Team sprint |
| Gold medal – first place | 2026 Santo Domingo | Team sprint |

Jessica Salazar Valles (Note: In this Spanish name, the first or paternal surname is Salazar and the second or maternal family name is Valles.) (born 21 September 1995) is a Mexican professional track cyclist. She rode in the women's team sprint event at the 2016 UCI Track Cycling World Championships. At the 2016 Pan American Track Cycling Championships, she broke the world record in the 500m time trial.

== Major results ==
2014
2nd Team Sprint, Copa Internacional de Pista (with Perla Merari Loera)
2015
Pan American Track Championships

1st Team Sprint (with Daniela Gaxiola)
1st 500m Time Trial
3rd Keirin

2nd Sprint, Copa Cuba de Pista
2016
Pan American Track Championships

1st Sprint
1st Team Sprint (with Yuli Verdugo)
1st 500m Time Trial
