= 2020 UCI Track Cycling World Championships =

Cycling world championships

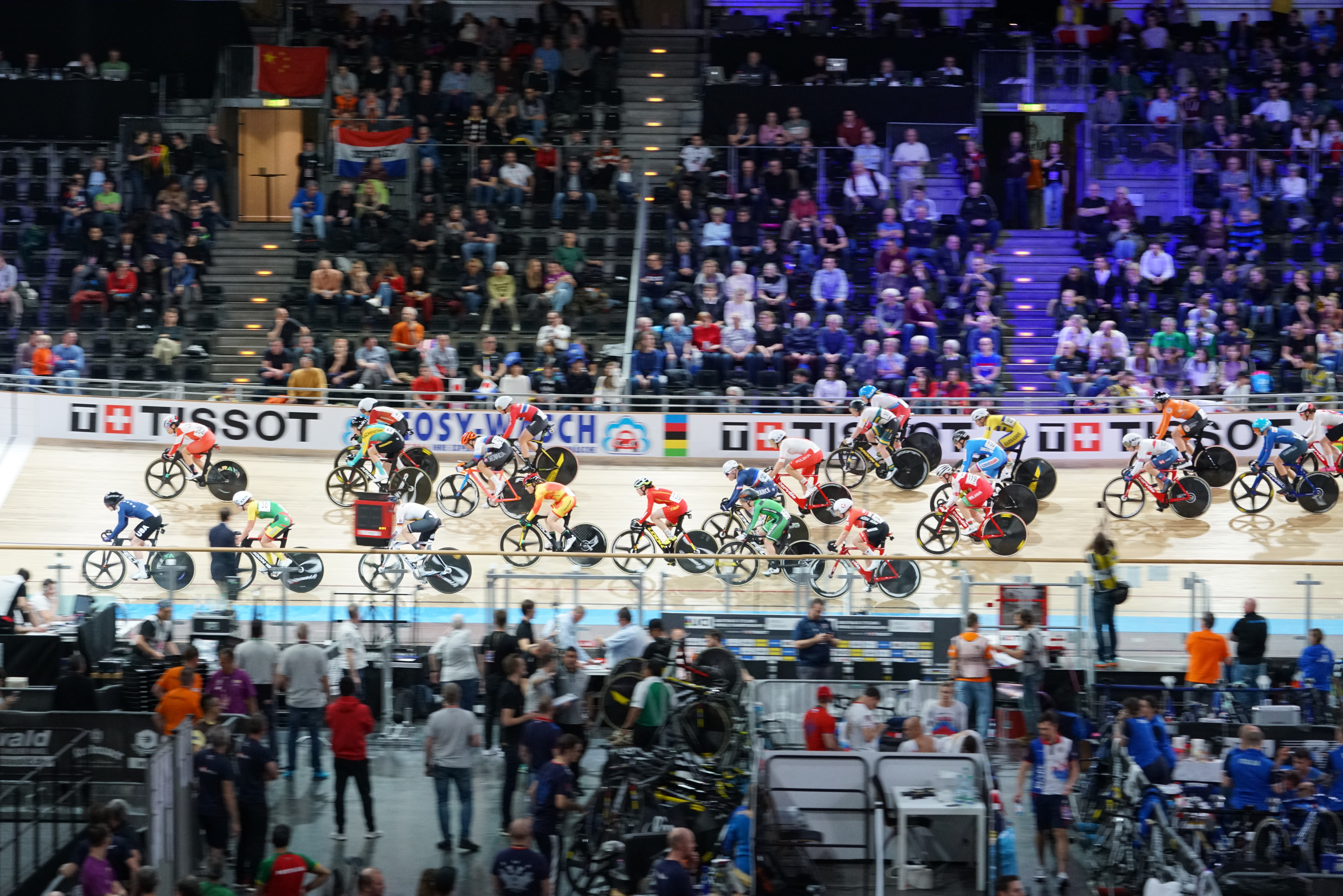
- Venue: Berlin, Germany
- Date: 26 February – 1 March
- Velodrome: Velodrom
- Events: 20

The 2020 UCI Track Cycling World Championships were held in Berlin, Germany from 26 February to 1 March 2020.

== Schedule ==
20 events were held:

All times are local (UTC+1).

Date	Time	Round
26 February	13:00	Women's team pursuit qualifying
26 February	13:00	Men's team pursuit qualifying
26 February	18:30	Women's team sprint qualifying
26 February	18:30	Men's team sprint qualifying
26 February	18:30	Women's scratch final
26 February	18:30	Women's team sprint first round
26 February	18:30	Men's team sprint first round
26 February	18:30	Men's team pursuit first round
26 February	18:30	Women's team sprint final
26 February	18:30	Men's team sprint final
27 February	14:30	Men's keirin first round, repechage, second round
27 February	14:30	Women's sprint qualifying, 1/16, 1/8 final
27 February	18:30	Women's team pursuit first round
27 February	18:30	Women's sprint 1/4 final
27 February	18:30	Men's keirin third round
27 February	18:30	Men's team pursuit final
27 February	18:30	Men's scratch final
27 February	18:30	Men's keirin final
27 February	18:30	Women's team pursuit final
28 February	15:00	Women's omnium scratch, tempo race
28 February	15:00	Men's time trial qualifying
28 February	15:00	Men's individual pursuit qualifying
28 February	18:30	Men's points race
28 February	18:30	Women's sprint semifinals
28 February	18:30	Women's omnium, Elimination
28 February	18:30	Men's time trial final
28 February	18:30	Men's individual pursuit final
28 February	18:30	Women's sprint final
28 February	18:30	Women's omnium, Points race

Date	Time	Round
29 February	11:00	Women's time trial qualifying
29 February	11:00	Men's sprint qualifying, 1/16, 1/8 final
29 February	11:00	Men's omnium scratch, tempo race
29 February	11:00	Women's individual pursuit qualifying
29 February	16:30	Women's time trial final
29 February	16:30	Men's sprint 1/4 final
29 February	16:30	Women's madison
29 February	16:30	Men's omnium, Elimination
29 February	16:30	Women's individual pursuit final
29 February	16:30	Men's omnium, Points race
1 March	11:00	Men's sprint semifinals
1 March	11:00	Women's keirin, first round, repechage
1 March	14:00	Women's points race
1 March	14:00	Men's sprint finals
1 March	14:00	Women's keirin, second round
1 March	14:00	Men's madison
1 March	14:00	Women's keirin, third round
1 March	14:00	Women's keirin finals

== Medal summary ==
=== Medal table ===
* Host nation (Germany)

Rank	Nation	Gold	Silver	Bronze	Total
1	Netherlands	6	2	1	9
2	Germany*	4	1	3	8
3	United States	2	3	0	5
4	Denmark	2	0	0	2
5	Italy	1	2	3	6
6	France	1	2	2	5
7	Great Britain	1	2	1	4
8	New Zealand	1	2	0	3
9	Japan	1	1	0	2
10	Belarus	1	0	0	1
11	Australia	0	1	2	3
12	Spain	0	1	1	2
13	Mexico	0	1	0	1
13	Russia	0	1	0	1
13	South Korea	0	1	0	1
16	Malaysia	0	0	2	2
17	China	0	0	1	1
17	Hong Kong	0	0	1	1
17	Norway	0	0	1	1
17	Poland	0	0	1	1
17	Portugal	0	0	1	1
Totals (21 entries)		20	20	20	60

=== Men ===
Event	Gold	Silver	Bronze
Men's keirin	Harrie Lavreysen; Netherlands	Yuta Wakimoto; Japan	Azizulhasni Awang; Malaysia
Men's madison	Denmark; Lasse Norman Hansen; Michael Mørkøv	New Zealand; Campbell Stewart; Aaron Gate	Germany; Roger Kluge; Theo Reinhardt
Men's omnium	Benjamin Thomas; France	Jan-Willem van Schip; Netherlands	Matthew Walls; Great Britain
Men's individual pursuit	Filippo Ganna; Italy	Ashton Lambie; United States	Corentin Ermenault; France
Men's team pursuit	Denmark; Lasse Norman Hansen; Julius Johansen; Frederik Rodenberg; Rasmus Pedersen	New Zealand; Campbell Stewart; Corbin Strong; Aaron Gate; Jordan Kerby; Regan Gough	Italy; Simone Consonni; Filippo Ganna; Francesco Lamon; Jonathan Milan; Michele Scartezzini
Men's sprint	Harrie Lavreysen; Netherlands	Jeffrey Hoogland; Netherlands	Azizulhasni Awang; Malaysia
Men's team sprint	Netherlands; Roy van den Berg; Harrie Lavreysen; Jeffrey Hoogland; Matthijs Büchli	Great Britain; Ryan Owens; Jack Carlin; Jason Kenny	Australia; Thomas Cornish; Nathan Hart; Matthew Richardson
Men's 1 km time trial	Sam Ligtlee; Netherlands	Quentin Lafargue; France	Michaël D'Almeida; France
Men's scratch	Yauheni Karaliok; Belarus	Simone Consonni; Italy	Sebastián Mora; Spain
Men's points race	Corbin Strong; New Zealand	Sebastián Mora; Spain	Roy Eefting; Netherlands

=== Women ===
Event	Gold	Silver	Bronze
Women's keirin	Emma Hinze; Germany	Lee Hye-jin; South Korea	Stephanie Morton; Australia
Women's madison	Netherlands; Kirsten Wild; Amy Pieters	France; Clara Copponi; Marie Le Net	Italy; Letizia Paternoster; Elisa Balsamo
Women's omnium	Yumi Kajihara; Japan	Letizia Paternoster; Italy	Daria Pikulik; Poland
Women's individual pursuit	Chloé Dygert Owen; United States	Lisa Brennauer; Germany	Franziska Brauße; Germany
Women's team pursuit	United States; Jennifer Valente; Chloé Dygert; Emma White; Lily Williams	Great Britain; Elinor Barker; Katie Archibald; Ellie Dickinson; Neah Evans; Laura Kenny	Germany; Franziska Brauße; Lisa Brennauer; Lisa Klein; Gudrun Stock
Women's sprint	Emma Hinze; Germany	Anastasia Voynova; Russia	Lee Wai Sze; Hong Kong
Women's team sprint	Germany; Pauline Grabosch; Emma Hinze; Lea Friedrich	Australia; Kaarle McCulloch; Stephanie Morton	China; Chen Feifei; Zhong Tianshi
Women's 500 m time trial	Lea Friedrich; Germany	Jessica Salazar; Mexico	Miriam Vece; Italy
Women's scratch	Kirsten Wild; Netherlands	Jennifer Valente; United States	Maria Martins; Portugal
Women's points race	Elinor Barker; Great Britain	Jennifer Valente; United States	Anita Stenberg; Norway

- Shaded events are non-Olympic
