= Lauriane Genest =

Canadian cyclist (born 1998)

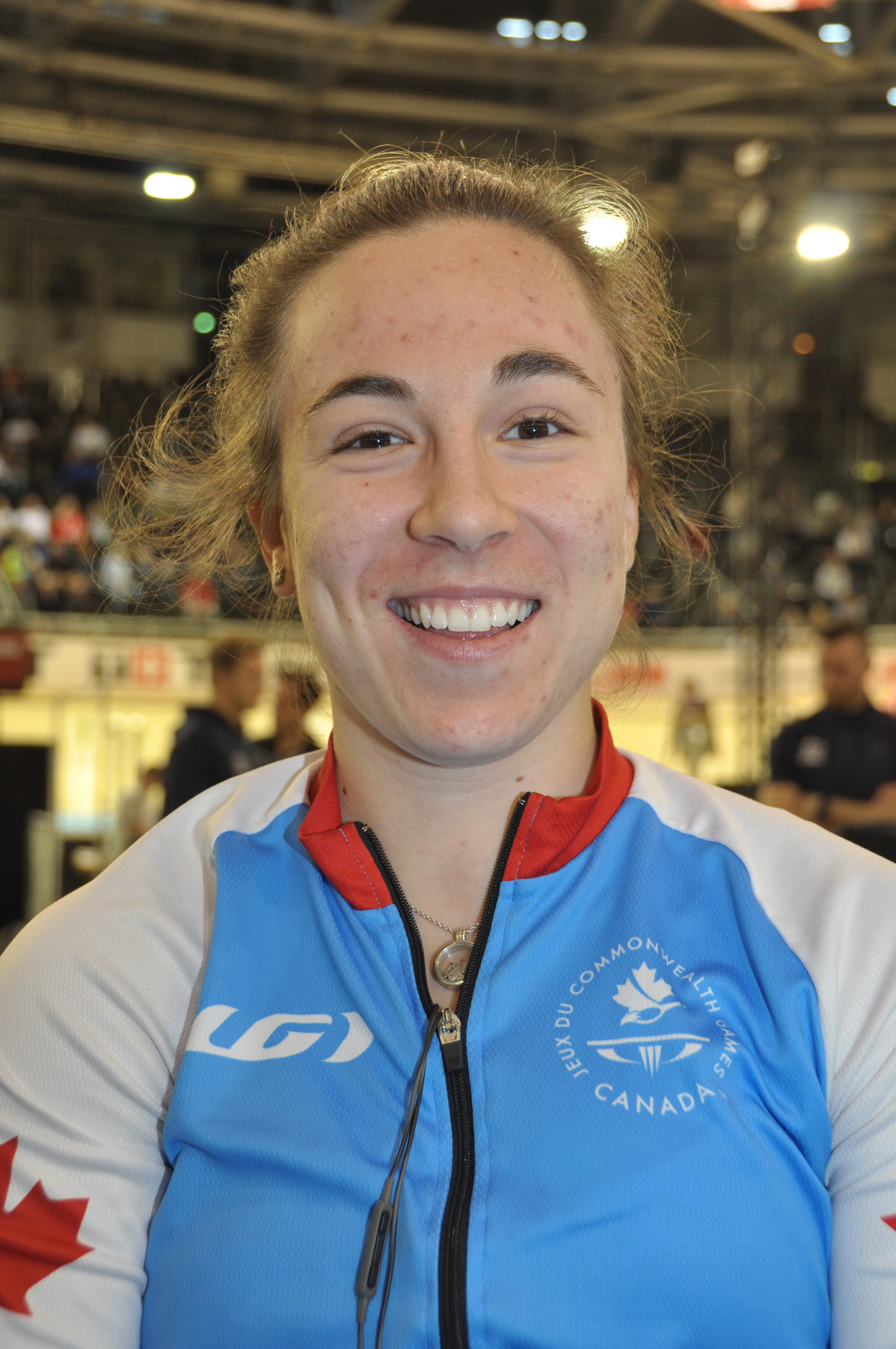
- Genest in 2018

Personal information
- Born: 28 May 1998 (age 28) Montreal, Quebec, Canada
- Height: 163 cm (5 ft 4 in)
- Weight: 66 kg (146 lb)

Cycling career
- Sport: Cycling
- Role: Rider
Medal record
Women's track cycling
Representing Canada
Olympic Games
Bronze medal – third place	2020 Tokyo	Keirin
Commonwealth Games
Silver medal – second place	2022 Birmingham	Team sprint
Pan American Championships
Gold medal – first place	2019 Cochabamba	Keirin
Gold medal – first place	2019 Cochabamba	Team sprint
Gold medal – first place	2022 Lima	Team sprint
Gold medal – first place	2023 San Juan	Sprint
Gold medal – first place	2025 Asunción	Sprint
Gold medal – first place	2025 Asunción	Keirin
Gold medal – first place	2026 Santiago	Sprint
Gold medal – first place	2026 Santiago	Keirin
Silver medal – second place	2018 Aguascalientes	Keirin
Silver medal – second place	2022 Lima	Keirin
Silver medal – second place	2023 San Juan	Team sprint
Silver medal – second place	2023 San Juan	Keirin
Silver medal – second place	2024 Carson	Team sprint
Bronze medal – third place	2018 Aguascalientes	Team sprint

Lauriane Genest (born 28 May 1998) is a Canadian professional racing cyclist. She rode in the women's team sprint event at the 2020 UCI Track Cycling World Championships in Berlin, Germany. She qualified to represent Canada at the 2020 Summer Olympics. Genest would win the bronze medal in the keirin event.

== Major results ==
2021
3rd keirin, Olympic Games, Tokyo
