= 2021 European Road Championships – Women's elite road race =

Women's elite road race
2021 European Road Championships

Race details
- Dates: 11 September 2021
- Stages: 1
- Distance: 107.2 km (66.6 mi)

Medalists
| | Gold | Ellen van Dijk (NED) |
| | Silver | Liane Lippert (GER) |
| | Bronze | Rasa Leleivytė (LTU) |

The women's elite road race at the 2021 European Road Championships took place on 11 September 2021, in Trentino, Italy. Nations were allowed to enter between 1 and 8 riders into the event, dependent on UCI rankings.

== Results ==
| Rank | # | Cyclist | Nation | Time | Diff. |
|---|---|---|---|---|---|
| 1st place, gold medalist(s) | 5 | Ellen van Dijk | Netherlands | 2:50:35 | |
| 2nd place, silver medalist(s) | 26 | Liane Lippert | Germany | 2:51:53 | 01:18 |
| 3rd place, bronze medalist(s) | 85 | Rasa Leleivytė | Lithuania | s.t. | |
| 4 | 40 | Katarzyna Niewiadoma | Poland | s.t. | |
| 5 | 7 | Demi Vollering | Netherlands | s.t. | |
| 6 | 11 | Marta Cavalli | Italy | s.t. | |
| 7 | 52 | Marlen Reusser | Switzerland | s.t. | |
| 8 | 87 | Alena Amialiusik | Belarus | s.t. | |
| 9 | 6 | Annemiek van Vleuten | Netherlands | 2:51:56 | 01:21 |
| 10 | 9 | Elisa Balsamo | Italy | 2:53:04 | 02:29 |
| 11 | 20 | Lisa Brennauer | Germany | s.t. | |
| 12 | 1 | Floortje Mackaij | Netherlands | s.t. | |
| 13 | 76 | Eugenia Bujak | Slovenia | s.t. | |
| 14 | 30 | Lotte Kopecky | Belgium | s.t. | |
| 15 | 51 | Elise Chabbey | Switzerland | s.t. | |
| 16 | 3 | Amy Pieters | Netherlands | s.t. | |
| 17 | 2 | Riejanne Markus | Netherlands | s.t. | |
| 18 | 47 | Juliette Labous | France | s.t. | |
| 19 | 57 | Eider Merino Cortazar | Spain | s.t. | |
| 20 | 22 | Kathrin Hammes | Germany | s.t. | |
| 21 | 93 | Omer Shapira | Israel | s.t. | |
| 22 | 60 | Katrine Aalerud | Norway | s.t. | |
| 23 | 77 | Urška Žigart | Slovenia | s.t. | |
| 24 | 14 | Erica Magnaldi | Italy | 2:53:19 | 02:44 |
| 25 | 38 | Marta Lach | Poland | 2:54:54 | 04:19 |
| 26 | 46 | Victorie Guilman | France | s.t. | |
| 27 | 67 | Tamara Dronova | Russia | s.t. | |
| 28 | 74 | Hanna Nilsson | Sweden | 2:54:56 | 04:21 |
| 29 | 64 | Mie Bjørndal Ottestad | Norway | 2:56:33 | 05:58 |
| 30 | 25 | Corinna Lechner | Germany | 2:57:07 | 06:32 |
| 31 | 61 | Susanne Andersen | Norway | s.t. | |
| 32 | 13 | Elisa Longo Borghini | Italy | 2:57:45 | 07:10 |
| DNF | 4 | Chantal van den Broek-Blaak | Netherlands | | |
| DNF | 8 | Marianne Vos | Netherlands | | |
| DNF | 10 | Sofia Bertizzolo | Italy | | |
| DNF | 12 | Tatiana Guderzo | Italy | | |
| DNF | 15 | Soraya Paladin | Italy | | |
| DNF | 16 | Debora Silvestri | Italy | | |
| DNF | 17 | Trine Holmsgaard | Denmark | | |
| DNF | 18 | Marita Jensen | Denmark | | |
| DNF | 19 | Pernille Mathiesen | Denmark | | |
| DNF | 21 | Tanja Erath | Germany | | |
| DNF | 23 | Romy Kasper | Germany | | |
| DNF | 24 | Lisa Klein | Germany | | |
| DNF | 27 | Trixi Worrack | Germany | | |
| DNF | 28 | Valerie Demey | Belgium | | |
| DNF | 29 | Ann-Sophie Duyck | Belgium | | |
| DNF | 31 | Lone Meertens | Belgium | | |
| DNF | 32 | Sara Van de Vel | Belgium | | |
| DNF | 33 | Julie Van de Velde | Belgium | | |
| DNF | 34 | Fien van Eynde | Belgium | | |
| DNF | 35 | Jesse Vandenbulcke | Belgium | | |
| DNF | 36 | Małgorzata Jasińska | Poland | | |
| DNF | 37 | Karolina Karasiewicz | Poland | | |
| DNF | 39 | Aurela Nerlo | Poland | | |
| DNF | 41 | Anna Plichta | Poland | | |
| DNF | 42 | Dorota Przęzak | Poland | | |
| DNF | 43 | Aude Biannic | France | | |
| DNF | 44 | Audrey Cordon-Ragot | France | | |
| DNF | 45 | Eugénie Duval | France | | |
| DNF | 48 | Gladys Verhulst | France | | |
| DNF | 49 | Morgane Coston | France | | |
| DNF | 50 | Caroline Baur | Switzerland | | |
| DNF | 53 | Sandra Alonso | Spain | | |
| DNF | 54 | Ziortza Isasi | Spain | | |
| DNF | 55 | Eukene Larrarte | Spain | | |
| DNF | 56 | Irene Mendez | Spain | | |
| DNF | 58 | Lourdes Oyarbide | Spain | | |
| DNF | 59 | Gloria Rodríguez | Spain | | |
| DNF | 62 | Ingvild Gåskjenn | Norway | | |
| DNF | 63 | Ingrid Lorvik | Norway | | |
| DNF | 65 | Tatiana Antoshina | Russia | | |
| DNF | 66 | Anastasia Chursina | Russia | | |
| DNF | 68 | Seda Krylova | Russia | | |
| DNF | 69 | Margarita Syradoeva | Russia | | |
| DNF | 70 | Sarah Rijkes | Austria | | |
| DNF | 71 | Christina Schweinberger | Austria | | |
| DNF | 72 | Angelika Tazreiter | Austria | | |
| DNF | 73 | Nathalie Eklund | Sweden | | |
| DNF | 75 | Urška Bravec | Slovenia | | |
| DNF | 78 | Yuliia Biriukova | Ukraine | | |
| DNF | 79 | Valeriya Kononenko | Ukraine | | |
| DNF | 80 | Olena Sharha | Ukraine | | |
| DNF | 81 | Olga Shekel | Ukraine | | |
| DNF | 82 | Hanna Solovey | Ukraine | | |
| DNF | 83 | Olivija Baleišytė | Lithuania | | |
| DNF | 84 | Inga Češulienė | Lithuania | | |
| DNF | 86 | Viktorija Senkutė | Lithuania | | |
| DNF | 88 | Zsófia Szabó | Hungary | | |
| DNF | 89 | Nikola Bajgerová | Czech Republic | | |
| DNF | 90 | Jarmila Machačová | Czech Republic | | |
| DNF | 91 | Nikola Nosková | Czech Republic | | |
| DNF | 92 | Rotem Gafinovitz | Israel | | |
| DNF | 94 | Lija Laizāne | Latvia | | |
| DNF | 95 | Tereza Medveďová | Slovakia | | |
| DNF | 96 | Megan Armitage | Ireland | | |
| DNF | 97 | Ellen McDermott | Ireland | | |
| DNF | 98 | Silja Jóhannesdóttir | Iceland | | |
| DNF | 99 | Hafdís Sigurðardóttir | Iceland | | |
| DNF | 100 | Manuela Muresan | Romania | | |
| DNF | 101 | Georgeta Ungureanu | Romania | | |
| DNF | 102 | Varvara Fasoi | Greece | | |
