= 2022 Bloeizone Fryslân Tour =

Race details
- Dates: 3–5 March 2022
- Stages: 3
- Distance: 286.4 km (178.0 mi)
- Winning time: 7h 21' 23"

Results
Jersey awarded to the overall winner	Winner	Ellen van Dijk (NED)	(Trek–Segafredo)
	Second	Riejanne Markus (NED)	(Team Jumbo–Visma)
	Third	Marlen Reusser (SUI)	(SD Worx)
Jersey awarded to the points classification winner	Points	Alice Barnes (GBR)	(Canyon//SRAM)
Jersey awarded to the youth classification winner	Youth	Shari Bossuyt (BEL)	(Canyon//SRAM)
	Team	Team Jumbo–Visma	

The 2022 Bloeizone Fryslân Tour was a women's cycle stage race that was held in the Netherlands from 3 to 5 March. It was the 11th running of the Healthy Ageing Tour, being held with a UCI rating of 2.1.

== Teams ==
Five UCI Women's WorldTeams, twelve UCI Women's Continental Teams and six Dutch cycling clubs made up the twenty-three teams that participated in the race. Only the NWV Groningen and Parkhotel Valkenburg did not enter the maximum of six riders, as they each entered five. 130 riders started the race, of which 109 finished.

UCI Women's WorldTeams

- Canyon//SRAM
- SD Worx
- Trek–Segafredo
- Team Jumbo–Visma
- Liv Racing Xstra

UCI Women's Continental Teams

- Arkéa Pro Cycling Team
- AWOL O'Shea
- CAMS–Basso
- Ceratizit–WNT Pro Cycling
- GT Krush Tunap
- Le Col–Wahoo
- Lotto–Soudal Ladies
- NXTG by Experza
- Parkhotel Valkenburg
- Stade Rochelais Charente-Maritime
- St. Michel–Auber93
- Team Coop–Hitec Products

Cycling clubs

- GRC Jan van Arckel
- NWV Groningen
- Team Drenthe
- WV Schijndel
- Watersley Race & Development CT
- Restore Cycling

== Route ==
Stage characteristics and winners
Stage	Date	Route	Distance	Type	Winner	Team
1	3 March	Surhuisterveen to Surhuisterveen	14.4 km (8.9 mi)	Individual time trial	Ellen van Dijk (NED)	Trek–Segafredo
2	4 March	Eastermar to Bakkeveen	135 km (84 mi)	Flat stage	Lonneke Uneken (NED)	SD Worx
3	5 March	Drachten to Drachten	137 km (85 mi)	Flat stage	Rachele Barbieri (ITA)	Liv Racing Xstra
Total			286.4 km (178.0 mi)			

== Stages ==
=== Stage 1 ===
3 March 2022 — Surhuisterveen to Surhuisterveen, 14.4 km (8.9 mi)

Stage 1 Result
Rank	Rider	Team	Time
1	Ellen van Dijk (NED)	Trek–Segafredo	18' 34"
2	Riejanne Markus (NED)	Team Jumbo–Visma	+ 7"
3	Marlen Reusser (SUI)	SD Worx	+ 25"
4	Katie Archibald (GBR)	Ceratizit–WNT Pro Cycling	+ 45"
5	Lisa Klein (GER)	Canyon//SRAM	+ 50"
6	Alice Barnes (GBR)	Canyon//SRAM	+ 56"
7	Sarah Roy (AUS)	Canyon//SRAM	+ 59"
8	Elizabeth Holden (GBR)	Le Col–Wahoo	+1' 02"
9	Nicole Steigenga (NED)	Team Coop–Hitec Products	+1' 03"
10	Jip van den Bos (NED)	Team Jumbo–Visma	+1' 05"

General classification after Stage 1
Rank	Rider	Team	Time
1	Ellen van Dijk (NED)	Trek–Segafredo	18' 34"
2	Riejanne Markus (NED)	Team Jumbo–Visma	+ 7"
3	Marlen Reusser (SUI)	SD Worx	+ 25"
4	Katie Archibald (GBR)	Ceratizit–WNT Pro Cycling	+ 45"
5	Lisa Klein (GER)	Canyon//SRAM	+ 50"
6	Alice Barnes (GBR)	Canyon//SRAM	+ 56"
7	Sarah Roy (AUS)	Canyon//SRAM	+ 59"
8	Elizabeth Holden (GBR)	Le Col–Wahoo	+1' 02"
9	Nicole Steigenga (NED)	Team Coop–Hitec Products	+1' 03"
10	Jip van den Bos (NED)	Team Jumbo–Visma	+1' 05"

=== Stage 2 ===
4 March 2022 — Eastermar to Bakkeveen, 135 km (84 mi)

Stage 2 Result
Rank	Rider	Team	Time
1	Lonneke Uneken (NED)	SD Worx	3h 32' 17"
2	Chloe Hosking (AUS)	Trek–Segafredo	+ 0"
3	Alice Barnes (GBR)	Canyon//SRAM	+ 0"
4	Maike van der Duin (NED)	Le Col–Wahoo	+ 0"
5	Rachele Barbieri (ITA)	Liv Racing Xstra	+ 0"
6	Lucie Jounier (FRA)	Arkéa Pro Cycling Team	+ 0"
7	Élodie le Bail (FRA)	St. Michel–Auber93	+ 0"
8	Ellen van Dijk (NED)	Trek–Segafredo	+ 0"
9	Martina Fidanza (ITA)	Ceratizit–WNT Pro Cycling	+ 0"
10	Riejanne Markus (NED)	Team Jumbo–Visma	+ 0"

General classification after Stage 2
Rank	Rider	Team	Time
1	Ellen van Dijk (NED)	Trek–Segafredo	3h 50' 51"
2	Riejanne Markus (NED)	Team Jumbo–Visma	+ 7"
3	Marlen Reusser (SUI)	SD Worx	+ 30"
4	Katie Archibald (GBR)	Ceratizit–WNT Pro Cycling	+ 50"
5	Alice Barnes (GBR)	Canyon//SRAM	+ 52"
6	Lisa Klein (GER)	Canyon//SRAM	+ 55"
7	Nicole Steigenga (NED)	Team Coop–Hitec Products	+1' 03"
8	Sarah Roy (AUS)	Canyon//SRAM	+1' 04"
9	Elizabeth Holden (GBR)	Le Col–Wahoo	+1' 07"
10	Shari Bossuyt (BEL)	Canyon//SRAM	+1' 10"

=== Stage 3 ===
5 March 2022 — Drachten to Drachten, 137 km (85 mi)

Stage 3 Result
Rank	Rider	Team	Time
1	Rachele Barbieri (ITA)	Liv Racing Xstra	3h 30' 32"
2	Martina Fidanza (ITA)	Ceratizit–WNT Pro Cycling	+ 0"
3	Élodie le Bail (FRA)	St. Michel–Auber93	+ 0"
4	Alice Barnes (GBR)	Canyon//SRAM	+ 0"
5	Katrijn de Clerq (NED)	Lotto–Soudal Ladies	+ 0"
6	Maike van der Duin (NED)	Le Col–Wahoo	+ 0"
7	Karlijn Swinkels (NED)	Team Jumbo–Visma	+ 0"
8	Océane Goergen (FRA)	St. Michel–Auber93	+ 0"
9	Letizia Paternoster (ITA)	Trek–Segafredo	+ 0"
10	Sanne Bouwmeester (NED)	GT Krush Tunap	+ 0"

General classification after Stage 3
Rank	Rider	Team	Time
1	Ellen van Dijk (NED)	Trek–Segafredo	7h 21' 23"
2	Riejanne Markus (NED)	Team Jumbo–Visma	+ 7"
3	Marlen Reusser (SUI)	SD Worx	+ 30"
4	Katie Archibald (GBR)	Ceratizit–WNT Pro Cycling	+ 50"
5	Alice Barnes (GBR)	Canyon//SRAM	+ 52"
6	Lisa Klein (CSR)	Canyon//SRAM	+ 55"
7	Nicole Steigenga (NED)	Team Coop–Hitec Products	+1 03"
8	Sarah Roy (AUS)	Canyon//SRAM	+ 1' 04"
9	Elizabeth Holden (GBR)	Le Col–Wahoo	+ 1' 07"
10	Shari Bossuyt (BEL)	Canyon//SRAM	+ 1' 10"

== Final classification standings ==
Legend
Denotes the winner of the general classification	Denotes the winner of the young rider classification
Denotes the winner of the points classification	Denotes the winner of the combativity award
Denotes the winner of the mountains classification	Denotes the winner of the combined classification
Denotes the winner of the sprints classification	

=== General classification ===
Final general classification (1–10)
Rank	Rider	Team	Time
1	Ellen van Dijk (NED)	Trek–Segafredo	7h 21' 23"
2	Riejanne Markus (NED)	Team Jumbo–Visma	+ 7"
3	Marlen Reusser (SUI)	SD Worx	+ 30"
4	Katie Archibald (GBR)	Ceratizit–WNT Pro Cycling	+ 50"
5	Alice Barnes (GBR)	Canyon//SRAM	+ 52"
6	Lisa Klein (CSR)	Canyon//SRAM	+ 55"
7	Nicole Steigenga (NED)	Team Coop–Hitec Products	+1 03"
8	Sarah Roy (AUS)	Canyon//SRAM	+ 1' 04"
9	Elizabeth Holden (GBR)	Le Col–Wahoo	+ 1' 07"
10	Shari Bossuyt (BEL)	Canyon//SRAM	+ 1' 10"

=== Points classification ===
Final points classification (1–10)
Rank	Rider	Team	Points
1	Alice Barnes (GBR)	Canyon//SRAM	40
2	Rachele Barbieri (ITA)	Liv Racing Xstra	37
3	Ellen van Dijk (NED)	Trek–Segafredo	33
4	Lonneke Uneken (NED)	SD Worx	30
5	Martina Fidanza (ITA)	Ceratizit–WNT Pro Cycling	27
6	Riejanne Markus (NED)	Team Jumbo–Visma	26
7	Elodie le Bail (FRA)	St. Michel–Auber93	25
8	Maike van der Duin (NED)	Le Col–Wahoo	24
9	Chloe Hosking (AUS)	Trek–Segafredo	20
10	Marlen Reusser (SUI)	SD Worx	16

=== Young rider classification ===
Final young rider classification (1–10)
Rank	Rider	Team	Time
1	Shari Bossuyt (BEL)	Canyon//SRAM	7h 22' 33"
2	Ilse Pluimers (NED)	NXTG by Experza	+ 5"
3	Lonneke Uneken (NED)	SD Worx	+ 16"
4	Maike van der Duin (NED)	Le Col–Wahoo	+ 17"
5	Maud Rijnbeek (NED)	NXTG by Experza	+ 20"
6	Daniek Hengveld (NED)	GT Krush Tunap	+ 36"
7	Katrijn De Clerq (BEL)	Lotto–Soudal Ladies	+ 41"
8	Mischa Bredewold (NED)	Parkhotel Valkenburg	+ 42"
9	Lieke Nooijen (NED)	Parkhotel Valkenburg	+ 51"
10	Silke Smulders (NED)	Liv Racing Xstra	+ 59"

=== Team classification ===
Final team classification (1–10)
Rank	Team	Time
1	Team Jumbo–Visma	22h 06' 34"
2	Canyon//SRAM	+ 25"
3	Trek–Segafredo	+ 28"
4	SD Worx	+ 48"
5	Le Col–Wahoo	+ 1' 50"
6	Ceratizit–WNT Pro Cycling	+ 1' 53"
7	Liv Racing Xstra	+ 1' 56"
8	Team Coop–Hitec Products	+ 2' 53"
9	NXTG by Experza	+ 3' 39"
10	St. Michel–Auber93	+ 4' 25"

== See also ==
- 2022 in women's road cycling
