= 2019 Dwars door Vlaanderen for Women =

Race details
- Dates: 3 April 2019
- Stages: 1
- Distance: 118 km (73 mi)
- Winning time: 2h 42' 34"

Results
	Winner	Ellen van Dijk (NED)	(Trek–Segafredo)
	Second	Marta Bastianelli (ITA)	(Team Virtu Cycling)
	Third	Lucinda Brand (NED)	(Team Sunweb)

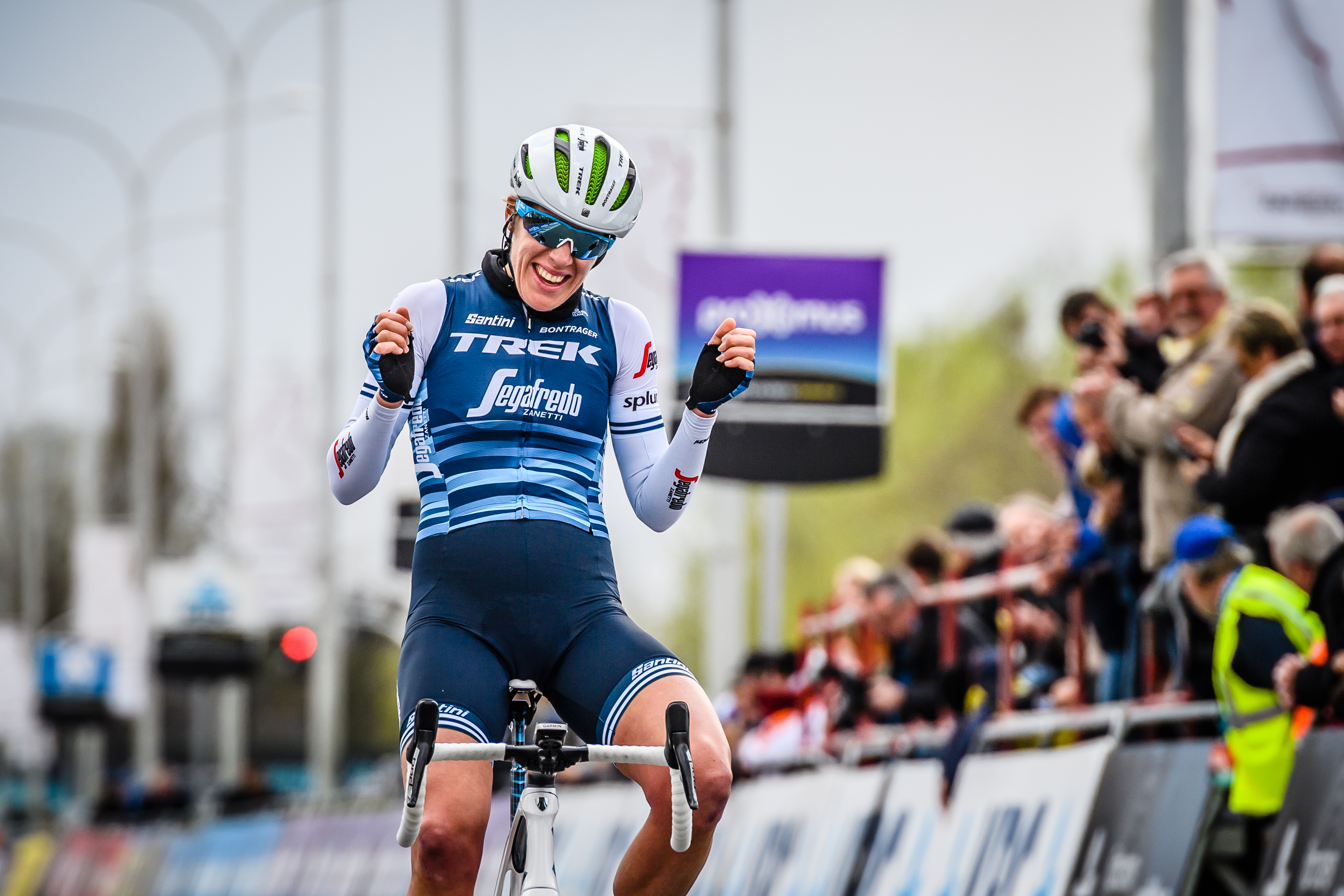
Ellen Van Dijk finishes first in Waregem.

The 2019 Dwars door Vlaanderen for Women was a road cycling one-day race that took place on 3 April in Belgium. It was the eighth edition of the women's Dwars door Vlaanderen. The race started in Tielt and finished in Waregem, covering a distance of 118 km.

The race was won by Dutch rider Ellen van Dijk of Trek–Segafredo for the second year running.

== Teams ==
25 teams competed in the race.

Professional women's teams

- Alé–Cipollini
- Aromitalia–Basso Bikes–Vaiano
- Astana
- Bepink
- Biehler Pro Cycling
- Charente-Maritime Women Cycling
- Boels–Dolmans
- BTC City Ljubljana
- Canyon//SRAM
- Doltcini–Van Eyck Sport
- FDJ Nouvelle-Aquitaine Futuroscope
- Health Mate–Cyclelive Team
- Hitec Products–Birk Sport
- Lotto–Soudal Ladies
- Mitchelton–Scott
- Movistar Team
- Parkhotel Valkenburg
- Servetto–Piumate–Beltrami TSA
- Team Sunweb
- Team Virtu Cycling
- Trek–Segafredo
- Valcar–Cylance

Three additional non-UCI women's teams participated: Rogelli-Gyproc U-23, Jos Feron Lady Force, and Multum Accountants Ladies.

== Results ==
Final general classification

Rank	Rider	Team	Time
1	Ellen van Dijk (NED)	Trek–Segafredo	2h 42' 34"
2	Marta Bastianelli (ITA)	Team Virtu Cycling	+ 32"
3	Lucinda Brand (NED)	Team Sunweb	s.t.
4	Elena Cecchini (ITA)	Canyon//SRAM	s.t.
5	Sheyla Gutiérrez (ESP)	Movistar Team	s.t.
6	Sofie De Vuyst (BEL)	Parkhotel Valkenburg	s.t.
7	Annemiek van Vleuten (NED)	Mitchelton–Scott	s.t.
8	Elisa Longo Borghini (ITA)	Trek–Segafredo	s.t.
9	Liane Lippert (GER)	Team Sunweb	s.t.
10	Katarzyna Niewiadoma (POL)	Canyon//SRAM	+ 36"

== See also ==
- 2019 in women's road cycling
