= Ellen van Dijk =

Dutch professional cyclist

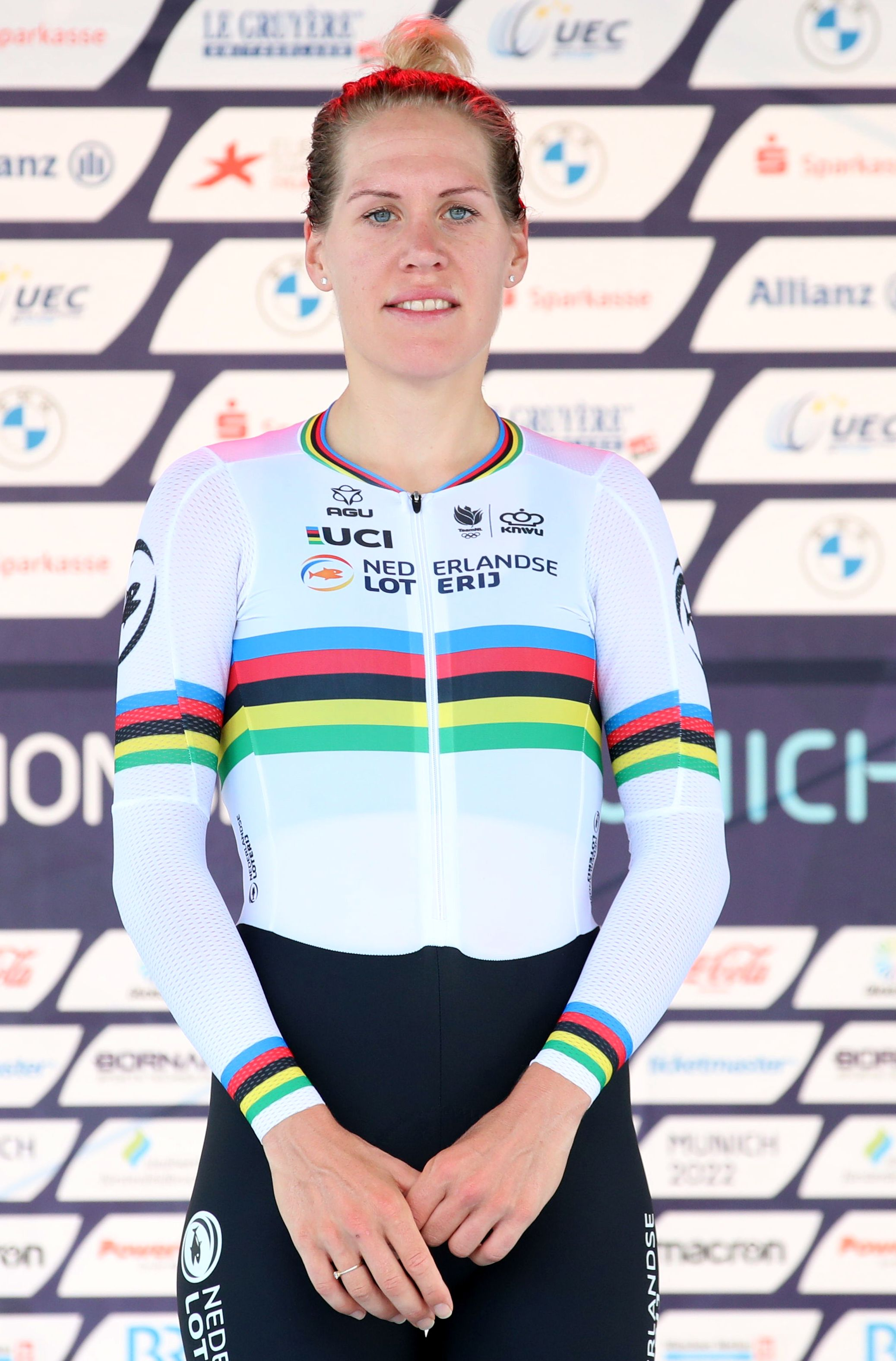
- Van Dijk after taking the silver medal at the 2022 European Championships

Personal information
- Full name: Eleonora Maria van Dijk
- Nickname: The Animal
- Born: 11 February 1987 (age 39) Harmelen, Netherlands
- Height: 182 cm (6 ft 0 in)

Cycling career
- Sport: Cycling
- Current team: Lidl–Trek
- Disciplines: Road; Track (former)
- Role: Rider
- Rider type: Time trial specialist

Professional teams
- 2006–2008: Vrienden van het Platteland
- 2009–2011: Team Columbia–High Road Women
- 2012–2013: Team Specialized–lululemon
- 2014–2016: Boels–Dolmans
- 2017–2018: Team Sunweb
- 2019–2025: Trek–Segafredo

Major wins
- Major Tours Giro d'Italia 1 individual stage (2013) Stage races Ladies Tour of Qatar (2011) Belgium Tour (2012, 2013) Gracia–Orlová (2013) Holland Ladies Tour (2013) Healthy Ageing Tour (2013, 2016, 2017, 2021, 2022) One-day races and Classics World Time Trial Championships (2013, 2021, 2022) European Road Race Championships (2021) European Time Trial Championships (2016, 2017, 2018, 2019) National Time Trial Championships (2007, 2012, 2013, 2018, 2022) Tour of Flanders (2014) Dwars door Vlaanderen (2018, 2019) Omloop van het Hageland (2018) Le Samyn (2013) Omloop van Borsele (2012) Sparkassen Giro (2010)
Medal record
Representing the Netherlands
Women's track cycling
World Championships
Gold medal – first place	2008 Manchester	Scratch
European Championships
Gold medal – first place	2008 Pruszków	Under-23 scratch
Gold medal – first place	2008 Pruszków	Under-23 points race
Silver medal – second place	2008 Pruszków	Omnium
Silver medal – second place	2008 Pruszków	Under-23 individual pursuit
Women's road bicycle racing
World Championships
Gold medal – first place	2013 Tuscany	Time trial
Gold medal – first place	2021 Flanders	Time trial
Gold medal – first place	2022 Wollongong	Time trial
Silver medal – second place	2016 Doha	Time trial
Silver medal – second place	2021 Flanders	Mixed team relay
Bronze medal – third place	2004 Verona	Junior road race
Bronze medal – third place	2018 Innsbruck	Time trial
European Championships
Gold medal – first place	2008 Pettenasco	Under-23 time trial
Gold medal – first place	2009 Hooglede-Gits	Under-23 time trial
Gold medal – first place	2016 Plumelec	Time trial
Gold medal – first place	2017 Herning	Time trial
Gold medal – first place	2018 Glasgow	Time trial
Gold medal – first place	2019 Alkmaar	Time trial
Gold medal – first place	2021 Trentino	Road race
Silver medal – second place	2020 Plouay	Time trial
Silver medal – second place	2021 Trentino	Time trial
Silver medal – second place	2022 Munich	Time trial
Silver medal – second place	2024 Limburg	Time trial
European Games
Gold medal – first place	2015 Baku	Time trial
World University Championships
Gold medal – first place	2006 Antwerp	Road race
Silver medal – second place	2006 Antwerp	Time trial
Team Specialized–lululemon
Women's road bicycle racing
World Championships
Gold medal – first place	2012 Valkenburg	Team time trial
Gold medal – first place	2013 Florence	Team time trial
Boels–Dolmans
Women's road bicycle racing
World Championships
Gold medal – first place	2016 Doha	Team time trial
Silver medal – second place	2015 Richmond	Team time trial
Bronze medal – third place	2018 Innsbruck	Team time trial

Eleonora Maria "Ellen" van Dijk (Dutch pronunciation: [eːleːjoːˈnoːraː maːˈrijaː ˈʔɛlə(ɱ) vɑn ˈdɛik]; born 11 February 1987) is a Dutch former professional road racing cyclist, who last rode for UCI Women's WorldTeam Lidl–Trek. Besides road cycling she was also a track cyclist until 2012. Van Dijk is known as a time trial specialist and is three time world champion. She won her first world title on the track in the scratch race in 2008. She became Road World Champion in 2012, 2013 and 2016 with her respective trade teams in the team time trial and in 2013 also in the individual time trial. In 2015, she won the time trial at the first European Games and the silver medal in the team time trial at the world championships.

Van Dijk started as a speed skater and as part of her skating training she undertook cycling as part of cross-training in summer. She excelled at both, competing nationally at junior level. She gave up speed skating and switched to cycling full-time after winning the national cycling championship for the fifth time in 2007. Along with her world title successes, Van Dijk has also twice been European track champion, three times European time trial champion and has won six World Cup races. In 2012, she competed in three disciplines at the 2012 Olympic Games in London, where she helped Marianne Vos win the gold medal in the road race, finished eighth in the time trial and sixth in the team pursuit.

== Personal life ==
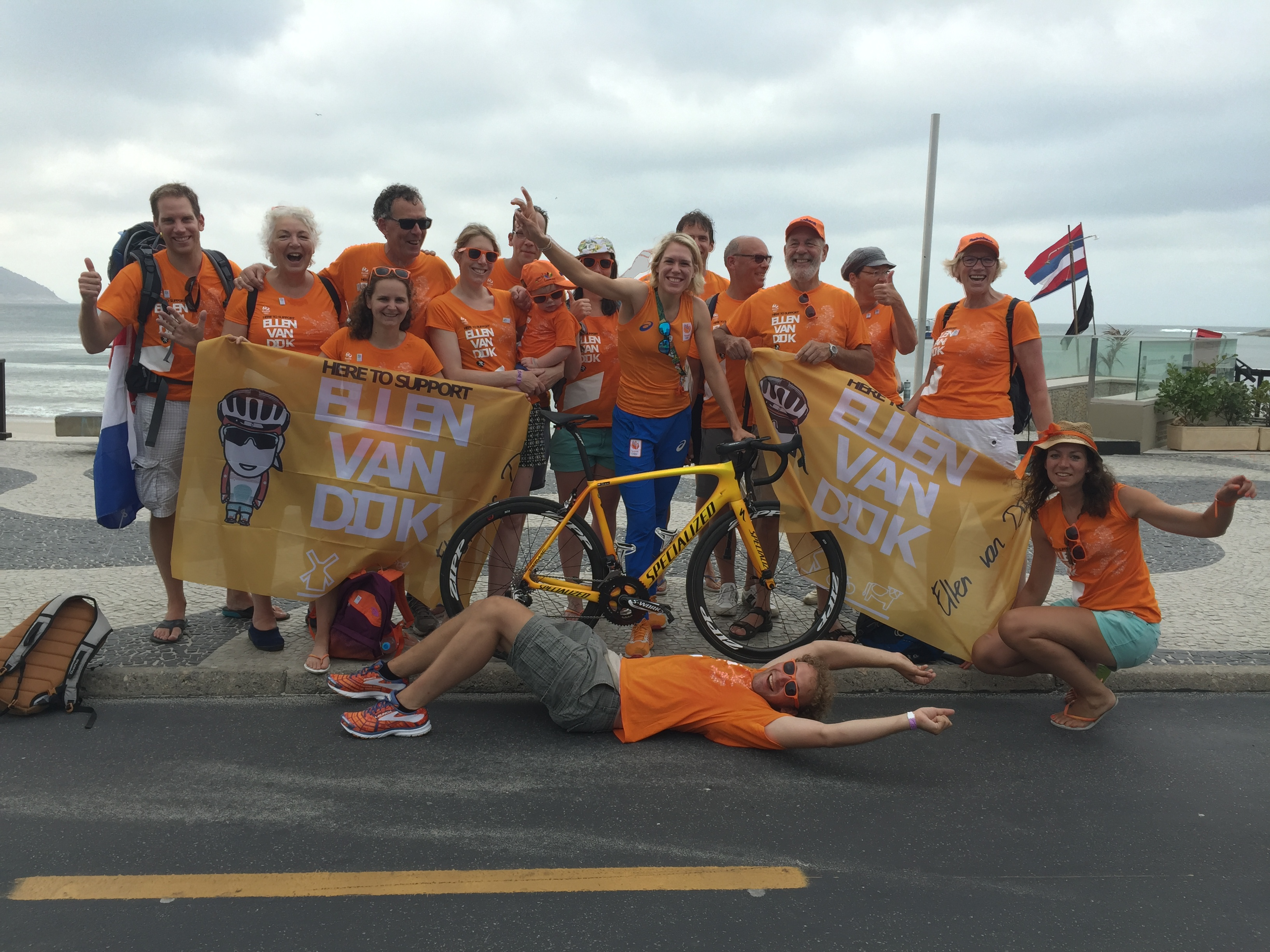
Van Dijk with her family and friends in 2016

Ellen van Dijk grew up in Harmelen, Utrecht together with her two older brothers along with her mother and father. Besides speed skating and cycling, she also played volleyball and performed gymnastics when she was a child. Van Dijk left Harmelen for her study to Amsterdam in 2006, where she still lives. During the first years in Amsterdam she shared her apartment with Mariëlle Kerste, her best friend and also a Dutch cyclist. Kerste moved out a few years later and Van Dijk has since shared an apartment with the Dutch cyclist Hannah Walter. In December 2014 Van Dijk moved to Woerden.

Van Dijk graduated from Minkema College, Woerden, in 2005 and earned a bachelor's degree in Human Movement Sciences at the Vrije Universiteit Amsterdam in 2011. After the Olympics she started her master's degree, but didn't have time to complete it.

== Sport career ==
=== Speed skating ===
Van Dijk started her career as a speed skater. As a very young child, she had performed in natural ice skating tours and, at the age of eight, she became a member of a local speed skating club. During the winter months, Van Dijk trained almost every day at the local speed skating rink in Utrecht. She did this from when she was aged twelve until she was twenty years old. Van Dijk competed five times in the junior Dutch Allround Championships; she finished in tenth place on two occasions in the all-around competition and in fourth place in the 3000m in 2005. She also rode the track record at the 5000 metres.

=== Early cycling years ===
When she was ten years old, Van Dijk started, together with her two brothers and Mariëlle Kerste, cross-training on a bike during the summer and she began competing in regional races. Because Van Dijk performed well, she started competing in national races at the age of 15 in 2002. In the same year, in her first national championship, she finished in fourth place. The following year, she won the Dutch national road championship in the novice category. In 2004, Van Dijk won two more national titles, this time as a junior, in the road race and in the road individual time trial. In the latter, she beat Marianne Vos, though Vos would avenge her defeat in Road World Championships in Verona, Italy. Vos won the junior road race world title, with Van Dijk finishing third. In 2005, Van Dijk again won the Dutch national junior title in the individual time trial but finished second in the road race, again behind Vos. In 2007, when Van Dijk was considered for selection in regional speed skating, she had to choose between speed skating and cycling– ultimately, she chose cycling.

=== Vrienden van het Platteland (2006–2008) ===
==== 2006 ====
Van Dijk achieved two stage victories in the Tour Féminin en Limousin and in the Giro della Toscana. In the middle of the season, Van Dijk suffered a clavicle fracture and as a result was hampered in the national championships. She finished 10th at the U-23 European Championships in Valkenburg and at the World University Cycling Championship, Van Dijk won the individual time trial and finished second in the road race. At the end of the season, Van Dijk was a reserve at the road world championships but she did not race. At the Dutch National Track Championships she won bronze in the individual pursuit.

==== 2007 ====
Van Dijk won the first stage in the Tour of Chongming Island and finished second in the general classification. At the national time trial championships she became for the first time Dutch champion in the elite category. In the time trial at the European Championships (under-23) she finished fifth. Due to her good results in the time trials she was chosen to represent the Netherlands in the time trial at the Road World Championships in Stuttgart where she finished 17th. Due to her good results she became sportswomen of the year of Woerden. Because Van Dijk had more spare time in the winter after quitting speed skating, she was invited to join the Dutch national track cycling team. At the national track championships she became Dutch champion in the individual pursuit, ahead of Marianne Vos and Kirsten Wild, and finished fourth in the scratch race and points race.

==== 2008 ====
Due to her good results at the national track cycling championships, Van Dijk was chosen to ride the individual pursuit in the remaining two (out of four) 2007–2008 track cycling World Cups, where she could, via the UCI World Ranking system, potentially earn qualification for the 2008 Olympic Games. She finished in Los Angeles and Copenhagen in fifth and fourth places respectively. After finishing fifth in the individual pursuit at the World Track Championships in Manchester, Van Dijk missed out on qualification for the Olympic Games; she finished 12th in the UCI World Rankings and only the first eleven riders qualified. The day after she took revenge by winning her first major senior title, the scratch race at the 2008 World Cycling Championships. With eight laps to go she attacked and rode solo to the finish line. Later that year, she also became European Track Championships in the scratch as well as in the points race. She rode to the silver medal in the omnium and the individual pursuit events. Despite not winning a medal at the Dutch time trial championships she won the time trial at the European Championships (under-23). She was not selected to ride the time trial at the Summer Olympics, because the course would be too heavy for her.

=== Team Columbia–High Road Women (2009–2011) ===
==== 2009 ====
On the track, Van Dijk followed other competitors by riding with a heavier gear. The change seemed to bear fruit when, in February at the Track Cycling World Cup in Copenhagen, she won her first two World Cup victories in the individual pursuit and points race and won a silver medal in the team pursuit. A month later at the Track Cycling World Championships in Pruszków, Poland, she failed to live up to her billing as world champion and her performances were not as good as those than in Copenhagen in February and in Manchester the year before. Indeed, Van Dijk did not reach the podium in any event. In spite of her disappointing performance in Pruszków, Van Dijk was approached by, and soon agreed to join, the professional road cycling team Team Columbia–High Road Women. Although the name of the team has changed on a number of occasions since, Van Dijk rode for this team until 2013. The road season did not start well as Van Dijk suffered a concussion in a crash during the Ronde van Gelderland in April and she was unable to ride for nearly six weeks. Almost immediately after having recovered from her injury, she defended successfully her European time trial title at the European Road Championships in July. After riding the time trial at the Road World Championships, Van Dijk took some rest in preparation for the Track Cycling World Cups. She skipped the National track championships, which were held two weeks after the World Championships.

==== 2010 ====
Van Dijk did not reach the finals at the Track Cycling World Championships in Melbourne, finishing fifth in both the individual pursuit and the team pursuit events. She also participated in the points race as a late replacement and finished eighth. Van Dijk won the time trial on the road in the Holland Ladies Tour en route to finishing third in the final general classification standings. She won the Sparkassen Giro and finished second in the Open de Suède Vårgårda World Cup race in Sweden. At the Dutch Track Championships, Van Dijk won five medals including gold in the individual pursuit.

==== 2011 ====
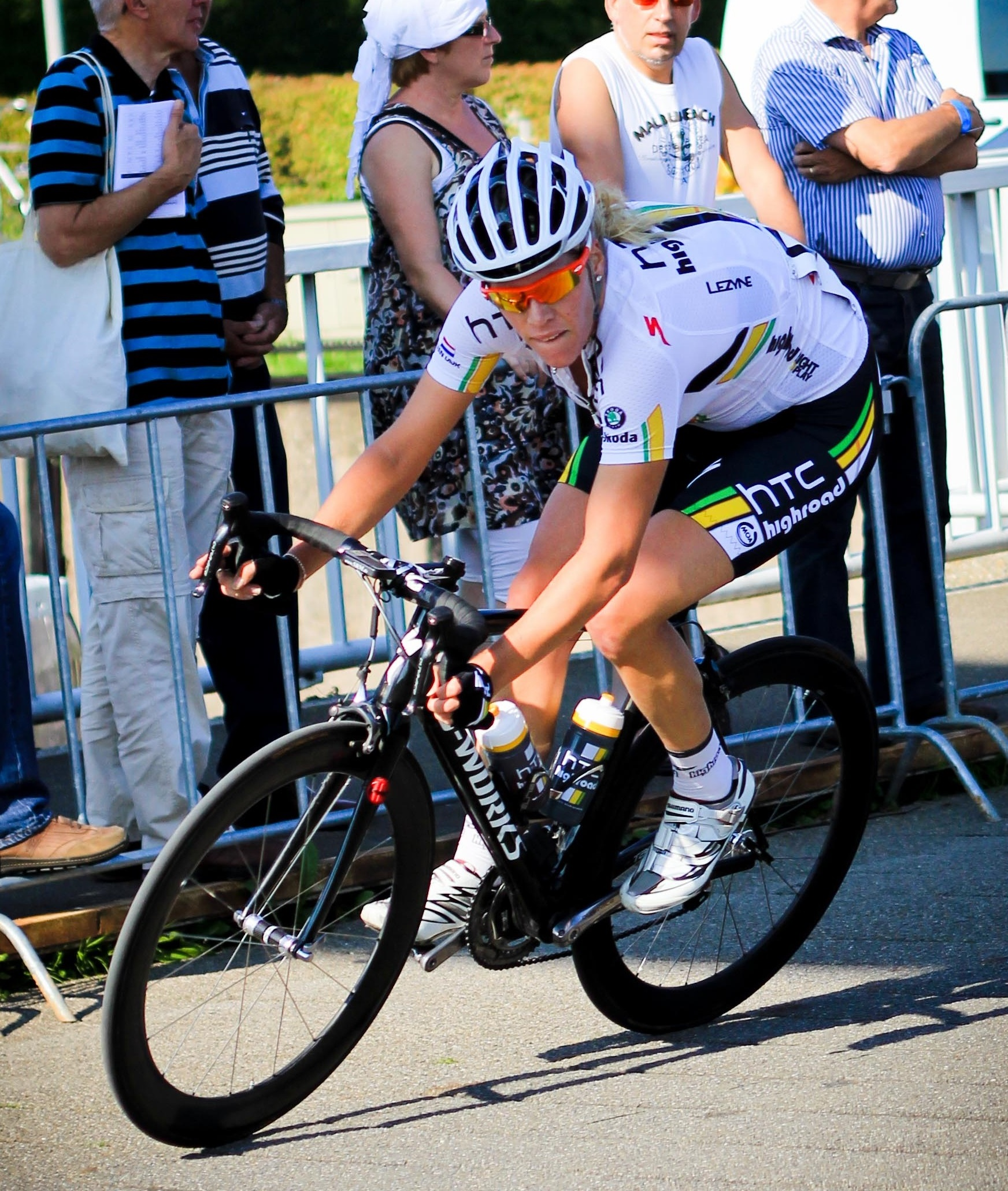
Ellen van Dijk in 2011, riding for HTC-High Road.

Van Dijk cycled in the team pursuit to a national team time trial record at the Track Cycling World Cup in Manchester. A month later however she rode with the team three seconds slower at the Track Cycling World Championships and finished in 5th place; the same position in which Van Dijk finished in the individual pursuit.

Van Dijk started the road cycling season by winning all three classifications (yellow jersey, points and young rider) in the Ladies Tour of Qatar, including winning the second stage. Van Dijk dedicated her stage and overall win to teammate Carla Swart, who died whilst training after being hit by a truck a few weeks earlier. The prize money she earned in Qatar was sent to her family. After riding stage races in the Netherlands, China and Spain she finished second at the Dutch time trial championships in Veendam and qualified for the World Championships later the year. A month later, in Sweden, she rode two World Cup races, winning the Open de Suède Vårgårda TTT and finishing second in the Open de Suède Vårgårda. As preparation for the World Championships she won the time trial at the Holland Ladies Tour. At the World Championships in Copenhagen she finished 6th in the time trial and was the best Dutch rider. Returning to the track, Van Dijk won the Track Cycling World Cup in Astana in a new national record, which was her fourth World Cup victory. At the end of the year she successfully defended her Dutch individual pursuit title at the Dutch National Track Championships and also became national champion in the madison.

=== Team Specialized–lululemon (2012–2013) ===
==== 2012 ====
After a knee injury due to an accident with a scooter and a few weeks of required rest and adjusted training, Van Dijk won a stage in the Energiewacht Tour; because she did not earn enough bonus seconds during the tour she finished second in the general classification. Van Dijk also won the individual time trial and the road race in the Omloop van Borsele. A few days later she started in the Gracia–Orlová, where she won the prologue and a stage and helped her teammate Evelyn Stevens to win the general classification. Back in the Netherlands, in Emmen, she became the Dutch time trial champion in the elite category for the second time in her career.

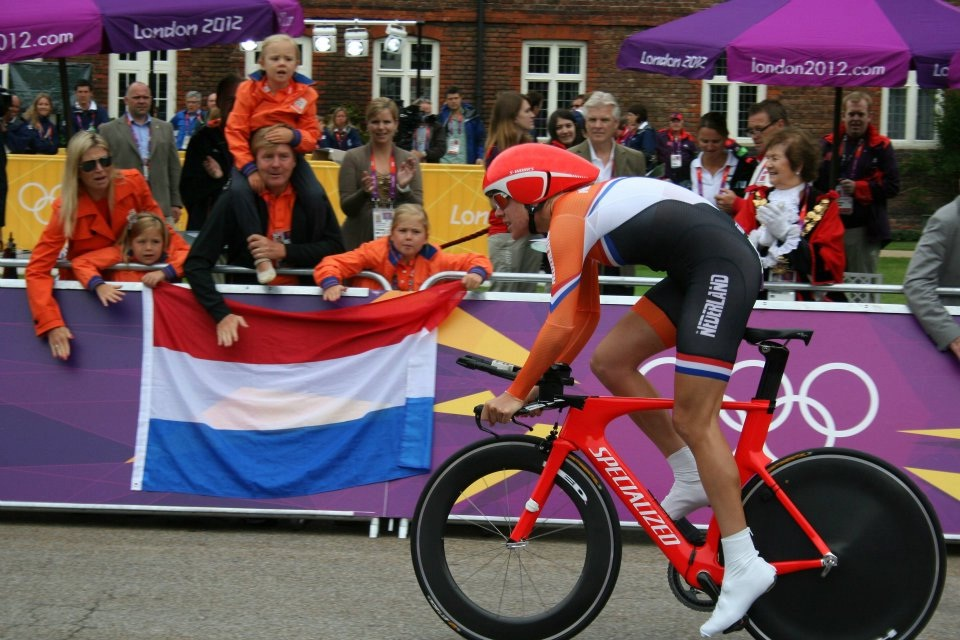
Ellen van Dijk supported by Willem-Alexander of the Netherlands and his family at the 2012 Summer Olympics.

Van Dijk was selected to represent her country at the Olympic Games in London, and she competed in the road race and the individual time trial on the road and in the team pursuit on the track. In the road race, Van Dijk was a domestique for Marianne Vos, who won the gold medal. Van Dijk attacked five times but finished outside the time limit. Because the victory of Marianne Vos was seen as a team performance, Van Dijk, Loes Gunnewijk and Annemiek van Vleuten were all subsequently honoured in both the Holland Heineken House and the Ridderzaal. In the time trial, Van Dijk finished eighth. She said afterwards that she was afraid to start too fast and subsequently lost a lot of time in the first part of the race. In the team pursuit, Van Dijk finished sixth together with Kirsten Wild, Amy Pieters and Vera Koedooder. In the qualification heats, the team had held the Olympic record for a short period and they rode a new Dutch national record in round one. According to Van Dijk, sixth place was the highest attainable place the team could have hoped to achieve.

As preparation for the Road World Championships, Van Dijk and her Team Specialized–lululemon won the team time trials at the World Cup (Vårgårda) and in the Holland Ladies Tour. In between these victories, Van Dijk won the first and final stages of the Lotto–Decca Tour and as a result also topped the general classification, finishing ahead of Kirsten Wild in second place. At the World Road Championships in Valkenburg Van Dijk became world champion in the team time trial with Team Specialized–lululemon. Three days later, Van Dijk finished fifth in the individual time trial on a hilly course that she afterwards described as being "not made for me". During the winter period she chose not to ride on the track to keep her focus completely on the 2013 road cycling season.

==== 2013 ====
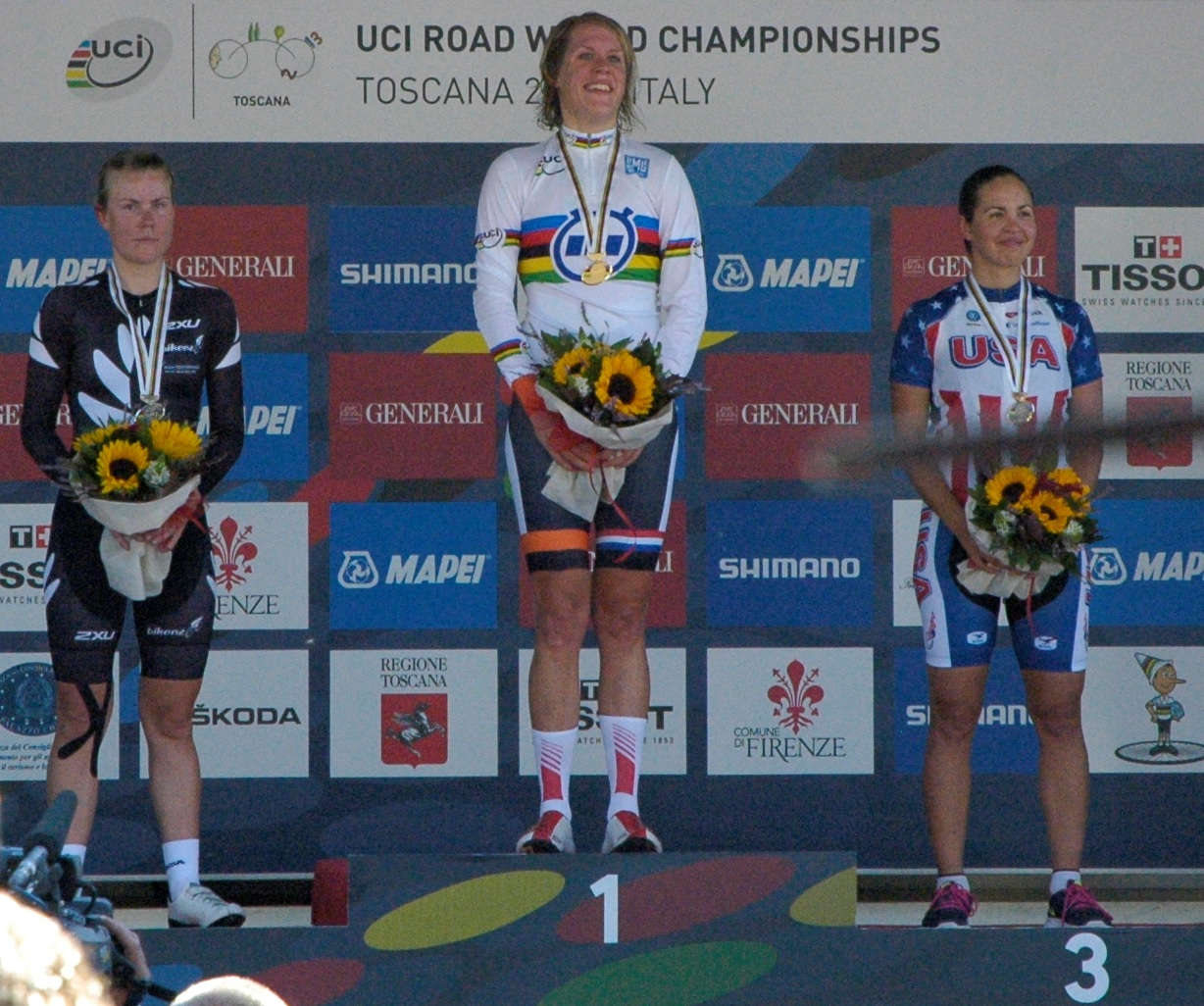
Ellen van Dijk won the women's time trial at the World Championships in 2013

Van Dijk started the season with a third place in the general classification of the Ladies Tour of Qatar. During the season openers Van Dijk rode very well highlighted by her victory in the Le Samyn des Dames. In the first three UCI World Cup races Van Dijk finished two times second (Ronde van Drenthe, Tour of Flanders) and rode to a third place in the Trofeo Alfredo Binda in Italy. Her second stage race of the season, the Energiewacht Tour included the first individual time trial of the season which she won with a big difference. After also finishing two times second she won the general classification. About the time trial she said later that she had been tested on her time trial position during her stay in Italy. After a day of testing and adjusting the position of the saddle and the steer she found a better position which she was able to maintain for almost half an hour. She also said that she rode at a higher power than in the time trials at the 2012 Summer Olympics and the 2012 World Championships. Van Dijk also improved riding uphill and finished sixt in the fourth World Cup race, the hilly La Flèche Wallonne. Her time trial continued to go well and she won the time trials at the EPZ Omloop van Borsele and two time trial stages in the Gracia–Orlová. She also won a mountain stage, the queen stage, in the Gracia–Orlová and so the general classification. In June she successfully defended her National Time Trial title in Winsum. A few days later she rode in medal position during the National Road Race Championships but had to abandon the race due to a broken derailleur in the second last lap. At the Giro d'Italia Femminile, the most prestigious stage race in women's cycling, she won stage 8, an individual time trial. With Specialized–lululemon she won World Cup team time trial at the Open de Suède Vårgårda TTT. After the last two World Cup races, the Open de Suède Vårgårda where she finished fourth and the GP de Plouay which she did not ride to prepare for the last stage races, she finished third in the overall World Cup standings. She rode strong during the stage races and won the general classification of the Belgium Tour as well as of the Holland Ladies Tour, including the team time trial stages.

As a preparation for the World Championships in Tuscany Van Dijk went during the season a few times to Italy to practise the time trial course. She trained at five in the morning to avoid traffic and made video recordings of the course to get to know the turns. In the week before the World Championships she won the French time trial Chrono Champenois – Trophée Européen. All the preparations paid off and the World Championships were very successful for Van Dijk. With her team she won for the second consecutive year the world title in the team time trial. Because Van Dijk had won almost all the time trials this year she was also the main favourite for the individual time trial. Despite the pressure she won the time trial with a convincing victory and became the second Dutch women to win this title. At the end of the championships, Van Dijk finished 16th on a non-preferable hilly road race course.

Due to her successful season she ended third in the 2013 Women's Road World Ranking. At the end of the year Van Dijk won the title Amsterdam Sportswoman of the year. She was nominated previous years but never won the title. She was also nominated to become Dutch cyclist of the year but lost from Marianne Vos.

=== Boels–Dolmans (2014–2016) ===
==== 2014 ====
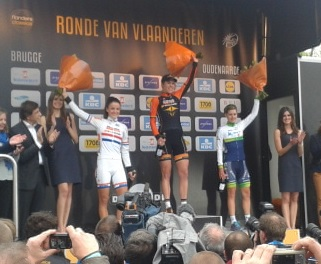
Van Dijk on the podium after winning the Tour of Flanders in 2014

In October 2013 Van Dijk announced that she signed a three-year contract with Boels–Dolmans, joining the likes of Lizzie Armitstead, Katarzyna Pawłowska and Christine Majerus. The time trial at the 2016 Summer Olympics was her big goal, and keeping her focus on time trials, world cup races and flat short stage races. Due to her focus on road cycling, she stopped competing on the track. Van Dijk was not able to start in the Ladies Tour of Qatar because she did not recover in time from an illness after riding mountainbikerace Egmond-pier-Egmond. She got back her shape during the first races and just missed the podium in the GP Le Samyn. At the first World Cup race of the season, the Ronde van Drenthe, Van Dijk helped teammate Lizzie Armitstead to victory by closing a massive gap in the final part of the race.

Van Dijk won the Tour of Flanders after a solo of 25 kilometres in April. After her time trial victory at the World Championships in 2013, it is her major victory of her career according to herself. At the end of April, Ellen van Dijk won for the third consecutive the time trial at the Omloop van Borsele. The day afterwards Van Dijk finished third in the road race which ended with a bunch sprint. As part of the same time trial competition, Van Dijk did not win the time trial at the GP Leende a month later. She finished second behind former teammate Lisa Brennauer. Van Dijk responded that here average power during the time trial was not great but also not very bad and that Brennauer is a world class time trialist. Two days later she finished again second in the prologue of the Elsy Jacobs stage race, two seconds behind Marianne Vos.

At the Boels Rental Hills Classic Van Dijk was part of front group that consisted of six riders which fell apart into a group of three riders. With an uphill finish, Van Dijk lost the sprint from Johansson (Orica–AIS) and finished second ahead of Amy Pieters (Rabo Liv). Van Dijk won the mountain classification of the race. In June, Van Dijk started as the main favourite at the Dutch National Time Trial Championships, but did not win her fourth time trial title. She finished second, with a margin of only 0.02 seconds, behind Annemiek van Vleuten (Rabo Liv). Van Dijk was disappointed and responded that she was not that good as in 2013 without having a real explanation for it.

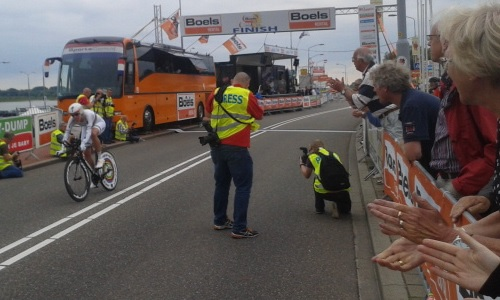
Van Dijk winning the time trial of the Boels Rental Ladies Tour in 2014

Van Dijk participated at La Course by Le Tour de France, the inaugural edition of a women's race on the final day and on the same circuit of the Tour de France with worldwide broadcasting. Van Dijk attacked multiple times and was the only women who was able to get clear for a few laps with a maximal advantage of over half a minute. At the Open de Suède Vårgårda TTT, where she finished third with her team, she got some confidence back about her time trial performances. In begin September Van Dijk won the time trial of the Boels Rental Ladies Tour, with a 12 seconds gap over her main rival Lisa Brennauer. Her first international time trial victory of the season. With the other stages ending in a bunch sprint and sprinters winning the bonification seconds, Van Dijk finished third in the general classification. A final test for het time trial capabilities before the World Championships was at the Chrono Champenois ITT. Halfway the 33.40 kilometres (20.8 miles) time trial she had a 39 seconds advantage over Hanna Solovey, but she finished second 8 seconds behind her because she lost about a minute after riding the wrong direction.

==== 2015 ====
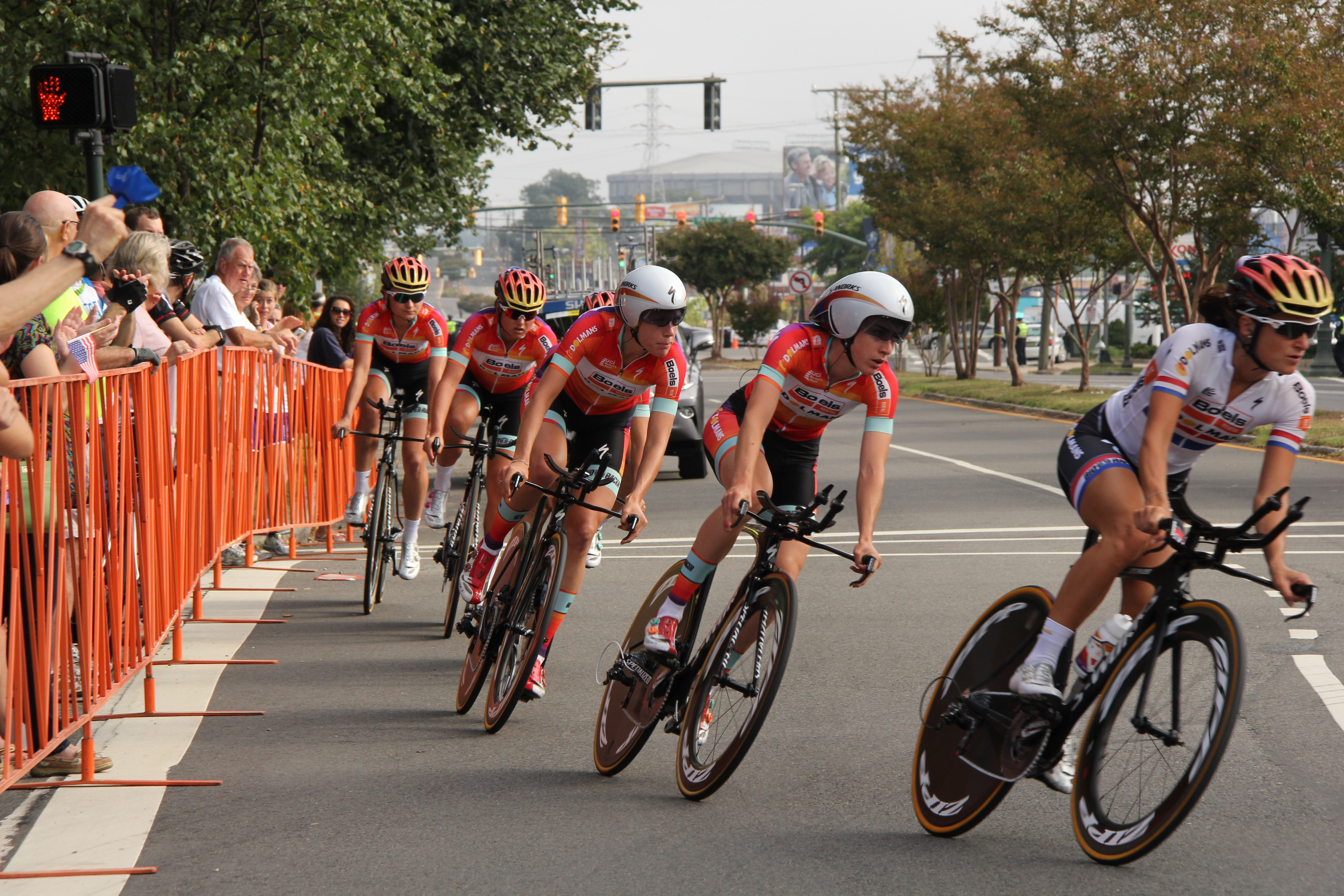
Van Dijk won with Boels–Dolmans the silver medal in the team time trial at the world championships in 2015

Van Dijk started the season as usual with the Ladies Tour of Qatar. She won the second stage and took the lead in the general classification. The day afterwards teammate Lizzie Armitstead took over the leading jersey. Van Dijk ended the tour in third place in the overall classification. During the first European race of the season, the Omloop het Nieuwsblad, van Dijk escaped from a front group of 15 riders on the Molenberg with 30 km to go. Anna van der Breggen was the only one who was able to follow her. The duo extended their advantage over the cobbled sections that followed, holding off the chase group to the line, where Van Dijk lost the two-up sprint. A few days later Van Dijk rode again strong in the Le Samyn des Dames. In the final kilometers she closed a one-minute gap with the front group. After closing the gap she was the leadout for Chantal Blaak who sprinted to victory. Due to a back injury, Van Dijk could not start in Omloop van het Hageland. In the first World Cup of the season, the Ronde van Drenthe, the team was eager to win. In the final Van Dijk was the lead-out for Armitstead. However, Armitstead lost Van Dijk in the last kilometer. Van Dijk continued sprinting and rode to the third place. She was happy with her result, but found it a shame that the team did not win. During the second World Cup race, the Trofeo Alfredo Bina Van Dijk couldn't ride uphill with the fastest riders and finished eighth, with teammate Armitstead taking the win. For the Tour of Flanders, Van Dijk heard a day before the race she was not as a leader of the team, although Van Dijk won this World Cup race previous year. Because Van Dijk prepared very well for this race she was disappointed, and didn't ride a good race finishing 24th. Van Dijk rode several races in the Netherlands, Belgium and Spain in April, May and the begin of the June. The most notable results from these race being a second place in the team time trial in the Energiewacht Tour and a second place in Gooik–Geraardsbergen–Gooik, being outsprinted by Gracie Elvin. Van Dijk was selected to represent the Netherlands at the first 2015 European Games in the time trial and the road race in Baku, Azerbaijan in June. The time trial was her big goal and she was the favorite to win it. With a good race over the straight circuit she was 36 seconds faster than the Ukrainian Hanna Solovey and won the first gold medal for the Netherlands. In the road race she was part of front group of four riders, together with countrywomen Anna van der Breggen. During the last lap it appeared that Van der Breggen rode for her Polish trade-teammate Katarzyna Niewiadoma and not for the Netherlands. Van Dijk was the brunt of these tactics and finished fourth. Four days later, back in the Netherlands, she was not able to win the national time trial championships, finishing almost half a minute behind Van der Breggen.

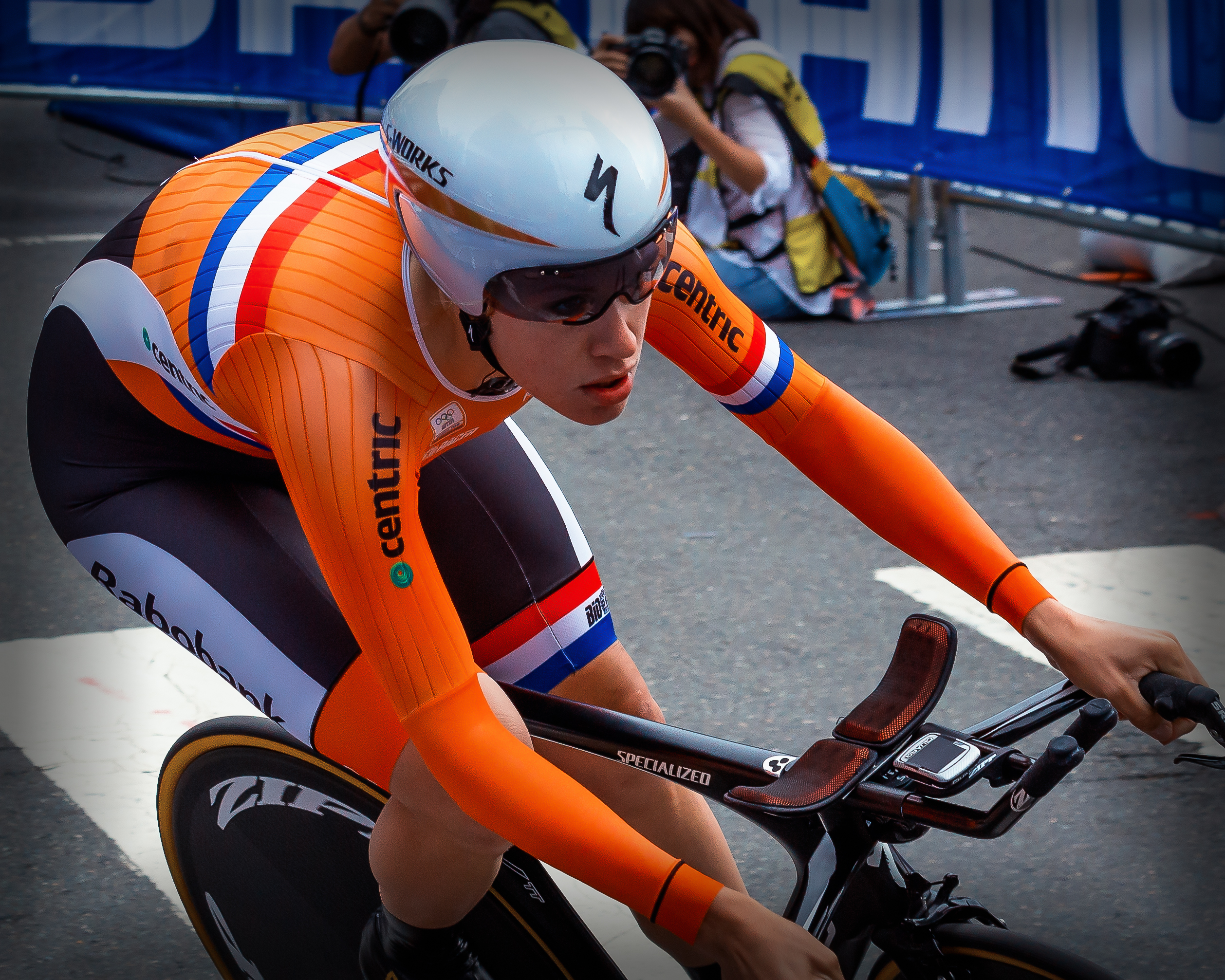
Van Dijk at the time trial world championships in 2015

During the La Course by Le Tour de France the rain poured down and made the course and cobbles slippery. Van Dijk was involved by one of the many crashes. She broke her collarbone and had to abandon the race. At home she had installed a high-altitude tent, and with a speedy recovery she went with Iris Slappendel to Switzerland to train at high altitude. Six weeks after her crash she could race again and started in the 2015 Boels Rental Ladies Tour on 1 September. She rode in the stage race stronger every day and finished second in the time trial, two seconds behind of Lisa Brennauer. She moved to the third place in the general classification and was able to keep this position.

At the 2015 UCI Road World Championships in Richmond, United States, she won the silver medal with her team in the team time trial. In the time trial she finished disappointingly seventh. A reason for her performance was that her rear wheal was not well attached in the frame. Her wheel ran into the frame, damaging her tire and puncturing her inner tube. For the road race she rode for Anna van der Breggen who won the silver medal and finished in tenth place herself.

==== 2016 ====
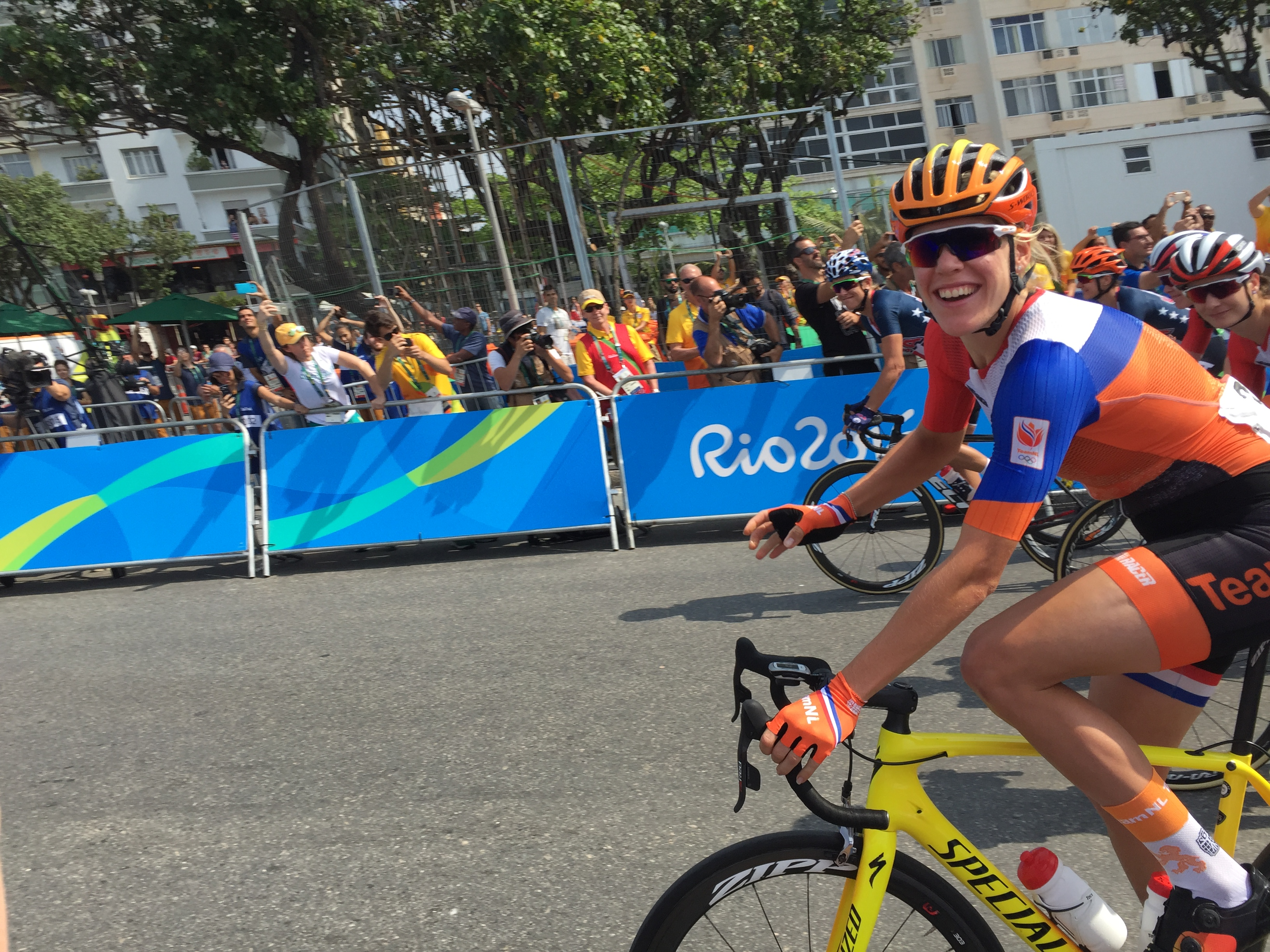
Van Dijk at the Olympic road race in 2016

Van Dijk started the road race season also this year with the Ladies Tour of Qatar. It was very windy and Van Dijk lost some time in the second stage because she rode in the second echelon. In the third stage she was part of the front group. In the last few kilometres she was able to ride away and won the stage, in the same city as she won the year before. She moved up to the third place in the general classification and maintained this position, with teammate Romy Kasper finishing in second place overall. At the Omloop het Nieuwsblad at the end of February, Van Dijk attacked at the last climb. She was caught and finished the race in arrears due to a bike change. Due to a crash during the race she went to the hospital afterwards and it appears she had one broken and some bruised ribs. She was not able to race for several weeks and returned in the women's peloton mid March. She rode strong for the Boels–Dolmans at the classic cycle races like World Tour races Gent–Wevelgem and Tour of Flanders for Women. Van Dijk had a very successful Energiewacht Tour. With her team she won the team time trial first stage. During the early sprint finish she was able to not lose any time. After winning the time trial of stage 4b she led the general classification. Van Dijk didn't give away her advantage in the last stage, and so she won after 2013 for the second time the Energiewacht Tour. After racing more international races from April to May the first championships of the season was the 2016 Dutch national time trial championships. However, due to a back injury she was not able to start. In the road race of the national championships a few days later she was not able win from Rabobank-Liv Woman Cycling Team who played it smart with their large number of riders. In July she won the time trial of the Thüringen Rundfahrt stage race, beating national champion Annemiek van Vleuten. For two stages she led the general classification but was not able to keep the yellow jersey after a breakaway of two riders got a too large advantage.

=== Team Sunweb (2017–2018) ===
At the 2017 UCI Road World Championships in Bergen, Norway, she won the team time trial alongside her Team Sunweb teammates. In August 2017, van Dijk won the time trial at the European Road Championships for the second time.

In August 2018, van Dijk won the time trial at the European Road Championships for the third year in a row. She also won the national time trial championship for the fourth time.

=== Trek–Segafredo (2019–2025) ===
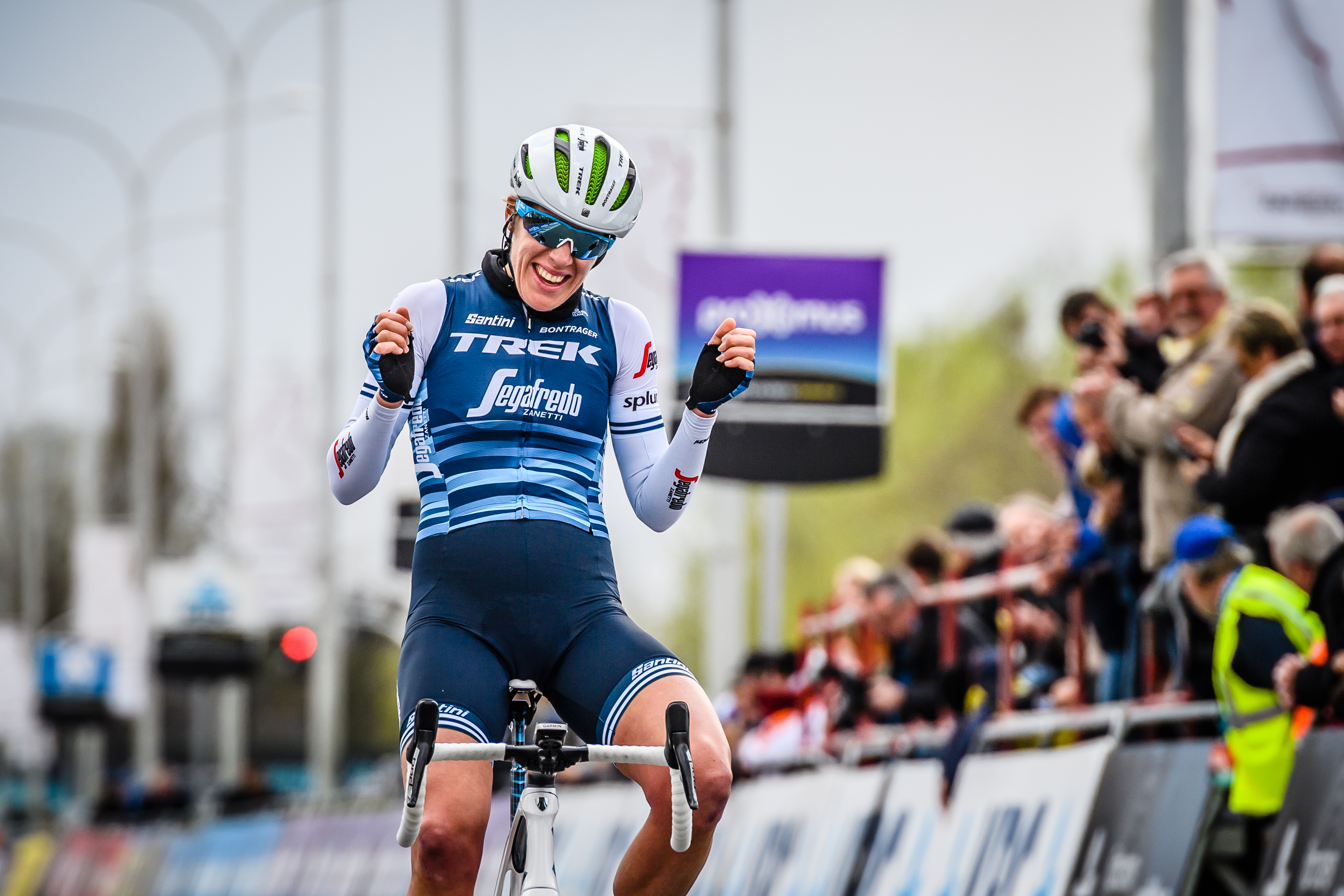
Van Dijk celebrating her victory at 2019 Dwars door Vlaanderen

In 2019, van Dijk joined Trek–Segafredo. In April 2019, she won Dwars door Vlaanderen or the second year running. In August 2019, van Dijk won the time trial at the European Road Championships for the fourth year in succession.

In September 2021, van Dijk won the road race at the 2021 European Road Championships. At the 2021 UCI Road World Championships in Flanders, Belgium, she won the time trial for the second time.

In April 2022 van Dijk announced that she would try to break the hour record on 23 May in Grenchen, Switzerland. On 23 May 2022, she did set a new record of 49.254 kilometres (30.605 miles). At the 2022 UCI Road World Championships in Wollongong, New South Wales, Australia, she won the time trial for the third time. She also won the national time trial championship for the fifth time.

In April 2025, van Dijk finished second at Amstel Gold Race. In July 2025, van Dijk announced that she planned to retire at the end of the year, citing fears of crashing, having suffered from multiple injuries in recent years.

=== Retirement ===
After retirement Van Dijk has been appointed as successor of Annemiek van Vleuten at the Dutch public broadcast NPO as co-commentator of female cycling events. In addition, Van Dijk accepted the role of coach for new and upcoming talent at Trek-Lidl.

== Career achievements ==
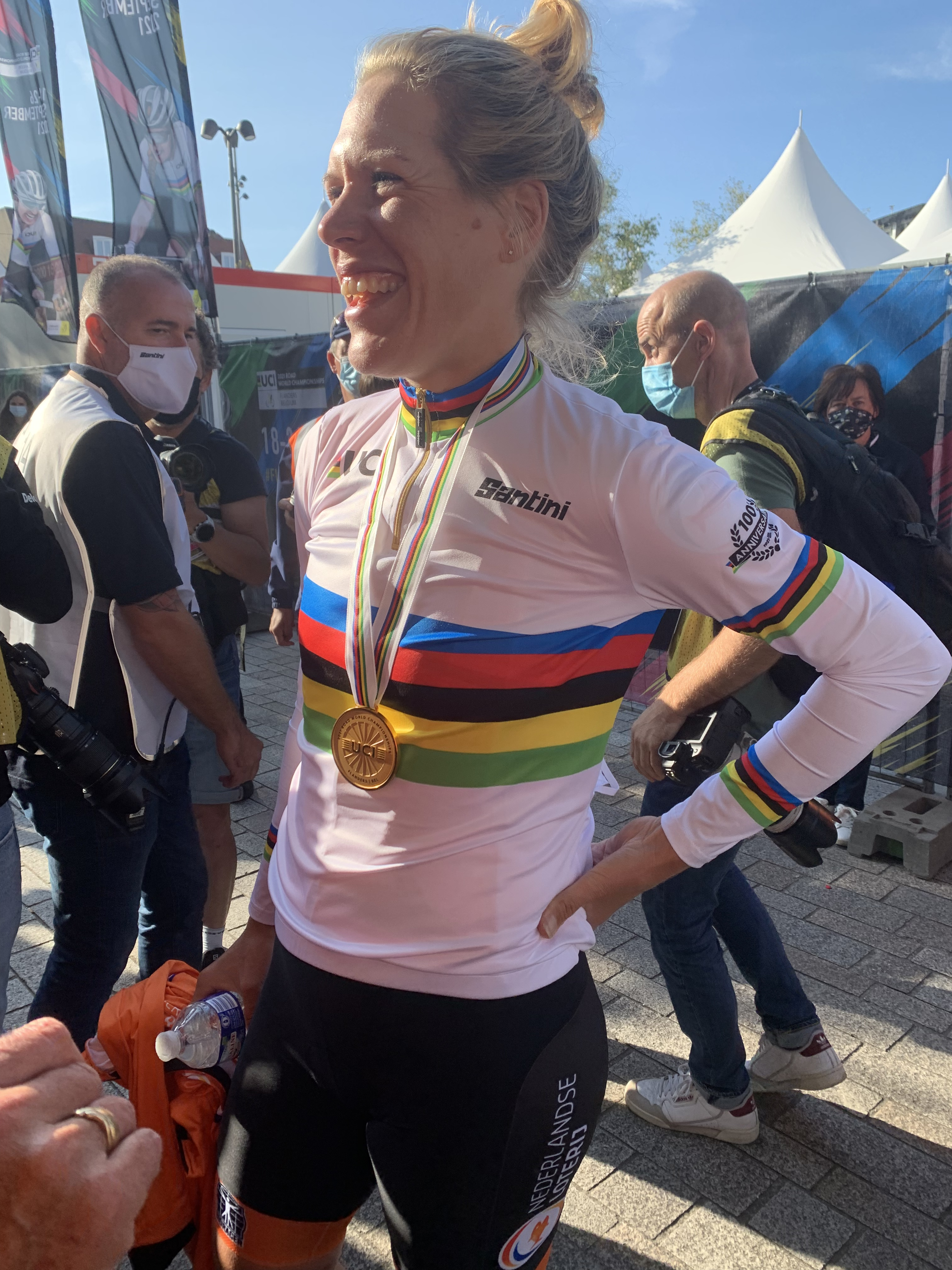
Van Dijk after winning the time trial at the 2021 UCI Road World Championships

=== Major results ===
==== Road ====
2004
3rd Road race, UCI World Junior Championships
2005
7th Road race, UCI World Junior Championships
2006
World University Championships

1st Road race
2nd Time trial

1st Stage 1 (ITT) Giro della Toscana
5th Overall Tour Féminin en Limousin

1st Stage 2

6th Lowland International Rotterdam Tour
2007
1st Time trial, National Championships
1st Profronde van Stiphout
2nd Overall Tour of Chongming Island Stage race

1st Stage 1

3rd Omloop van Borsele
3rd Tour of Chongming Island Time trial
5th Time trial, UEC European Under-23 Championships
5th Chrono Champenois – Trophée Européen
6th Omloop Het Volk
7th Novilon Internationale Damesronde van Drenthe
7th Sparkassen Giro
2008
1st Time trial, UEC European Under-23 Championships
Tour de l'Aude

1st Young rider classification
1st Stage 2 (TTT)

1st Stage 1 (ITT) Tour Féminin en Limousin
3rd Overall Ster Zeeuwsche Eilanden
7th Chrono Champenois – Trophée Européen
2009
1st Time trial, UEC European Under-23 Championships
1st Stage 1 (ITT) Giro della Toscana
1st Stage 2 (ITT) Holland Ladies Tour
2nd Open de Suède Vårgårda TTT
3rd Time trial, National Championships
4th Overall Tour of Qatar

1st Young rider classification

2010
1st Sparkassen Giro
2nd Open de Suède Vårgårda TTT
3rd Overall Holland Ladies Tour

1st Stage 6 (ITT)

5th Omloop van Borsele
5th Open de Suède Vårgårda
6th Ronde van Gelderland
6th Tour of Chongming Island World Cup
7th Chrono Champenois – Trophée Européen
9th GP Stad Roeselare
10th Novilon Eurocup Ronde van Drenthe
2011
1st Overall Tour of Qatar

1st Points classification
1st Young rider classification
1st Stage 2

1st Open de Suède Vårgårda TTT
1st Stage 2 (ITT) Holland Ladies Tour
2nd Time trial, National Championships
2nd Open de Suède Vårgårda
5th 7-Dorpenomloop Aalburg
6th UCI Road World Championships – Women's time trial
2012
1st Team time trial
1st Time trial, National Championships
1st Overall Belgium Tour

1st Stage 3

1st Time trial, EPZ Omloop van Borsele
1st Open de Suède Vårgårda TTT
1st Stage 1 (TTT) Holland Ladies Tour
2nd Overall Energiewacht Tour

1st Stage 4b (TTT)

2nd Omloop Het Nieuwsblad
4th Overall Tour of Qatar
5th UCI Road World Championships – Women's time trial
6th Overall Gracia Orlová

1st Prologue & Stage 2 (ITT)

6th Tour of Flanders
8th Time trial, Olympic Games
10th Durango-Durango Emakumeen Saria
2013
1st UCI Road World Championships – Women's time trial
1st Team time trial
1st Time trial, National Championships
1st Overall Gracia–Orlová

1st Points classification
1st Prologue, Stages 2 (ITT) & 4

1st Overall Energiewacht Tour

1st Stage 3a (ITT)

1st Overall Belgium Tour

1st Stage 1 (TTT)

1st Overall Holland Ladies Tour

1st Stage 2 (TTT)

1st Time trial, EPZ Omloop van Borsele
1st Le Samyn des Dames
1st Open de Suède Vårgårda TTT
1st Chrono Champenois
1st Stage 8 (ITT) Giro Rosa
2nd Ronde van Drenthe
2nd Tour of Flanders
3rd Overall UCI World Rankings
3rd Overall UCI World Cup
3rd Overall Tour of Qatar
3rd Trofeo Alfredo Binda
4th Open de Suède Vårgårda
5th Holland Hills Classic
6th Omloop Het Nieuwsblad
6th Omloop van het Hageland
6th Drentse 8 van Dwingeloo
6th La Flèche Wallonne
7th Durango-Durango Emakumeen Saria
2014
1st Tour of Flanders
EPZ Omloop van Borsele

1st Time trial
3rd Road race

1st RaboRonde Heerlen
2nd Time trial, National Championships
2nd Chrono Champenois
2nd Holland Hills Classic
3rd Overall Holland Ladies Tour

1st Stage 1 (ITT)

3rd Open de Suède Vårgårda TTT
4th Overall Festival Luxembourgeois Elsy Jacobs
4th Le Samyn
7th UCI Road World Championships – Women's time trial
7th Ronde van Drenthe World Cup
8th Overall Energiewacht Tour
8th Trofeo Alfredo Binda
10th La Flèche Wallonne
2015
European Games

1st Time trial
4th Road race

1st Time trial, EPZ Omloop van Borsele
2nd Team time trial

10th Road race

2nd Time trial, National Championships
2nd Omloop Het Nieuwsblad
2nd Gooik–Geraardsbergen–Gooik
3rd Overall Tour of Qatar

1st Stage 2

3rd Overall Holland Ladies Tour
3rd Ronde van Drenthe
4th Ronde van Overijssel
6th Overall Energiewacht Tour
7th UCI Road World Championships – Women's time trial
8th Trofeo Alfredo Binda
8th Holland Hills Classic
8th Durango-Durango Emakumeen Saria
2016
1st UCI Road World Championships – Women's team time trial
1st Time trial, UEC European Championships
1st Overall Energiewacht Tour

1st Stages 1 (TTT) & 4b (ITT)

1st Open de Suède Vårgårda TTT
2nd UCI Road World Championships – Women's time trial
2nd Overall Holland Ladies Tour

1st Stage 2 (TTT)

3rd Overall Tour of Qatar

1st Stage 3

3rd Overall Thüringen Rundfahrt

1st Stage 4 (ITT)

3rd Chrono Champenois
4th Time trial, Olympic Games
5th Holland Hills Classic
6th Tour of Flanders
8th Gent–Wevelgem
8th Diamond Tour
2017
1st UCI Road World Championships – Women's team time trial
1st Time trial, UEC European Championships
1st Overall Healthy Ageing Tour

1st Points classification
1st Stage 1a (ITT)

1st Tour de Okinawa
National Championships

2nd Time trial
5th Road race

2nd Overall Thüringen Rundfahrt
2nd Gooik–Geraardsbergen–Gooik
3rd Overall Tour of Norway

1st Prologue

3rd Overall Holland Ladies Tour
4th Omloop Het Nieuwsblad
4th Liège–Bastogne–Liège
5th UCI Road World Championships – Women's time trial
5th Overall The Women's Tour
5th Crescent Vårgårda Road Race
6th Le Samyn
8th Omloop van het Hageland
10th Amstel Gold Race
2018
1st Time trial, UEC European Championships
1st Time trial, National Championships
1st Overall Madrid Challenge by La Vuelta

1st Stage 1 (TTT)

1st Dwars door Vlaanderen
1st Omloop van het Hageland
1st Stage 1 (TTT) Giro Rosa
2nd Overall Thüringen Rundfahrt

1st Stage 7 (ITT)

2nd Overall Holland Ladies Tour
3rd UCI Road World Championships – Women's time trial
3rd UCI Road World Championships – Women's team time trial
5th Liège–Bastogne–Liège
7th Tour of Flanders
9th Strade Bianche
10th Ronde van Drenthe
2019
1st Time trial, UEC European Championships
1st Dwars door Vlaanderen
1st Postnord UCI WWT Vårgårda West Sweden TTT
2nd Time trial, National Championships
2nd Overall Healthy Ageing Tour

1st Stage 4a (ITT)

3rd Ronde van Drenthe
5th Tour of Flanders
6th Overall Thüringen Rundfahrt

1st Stage 5 (ITT)

6th Drentse Acht van Westerveld
2020
1st Stage 1 (TTT) Giro Rosa
2nd Time trial, UEC European Championships
3rd UCI Road World Championships – Women's time trial
3rd Liège–Bastogne–Liège
4th Overall Challenge by La Vuelta
5th Omloop Het Nieuwsblad
5th Le Samyn
7th Durango-Durango Emakumeen Saria
8th Three Days of Bruges–De Panne
2021
1st UCI Road World Championships – Women's time trial
UEC European Championships

1st Road race
2nd Time trial

1st Overall Healthy Ageing Tour

1st Combination classification
1st Stage 2 (ITT)

1st Stage 1 (TTT) Giro Rosa
2nd UCI Road World Championships – Mixed team relay
2nd Time trial, National Championships
2nd Overall Belgium Tour

1st Mountains classification
1st Prologue

3rd Overall Holland Ladies Tour
9th Dwars door Vlaanderen
10th Strade Bianche
10th Donostia San Sebastián Klasikoa
2022
1st UCI Road World Championships – Women's time trial
1st Time trial, National Championships
1st Overall Bloeizone Fryslân Tour

1st Stage 1 (ITT)

1st Overall Baloise Ladies Tour

1st Prologue & Stage 3b (ITT)

1st Chrono des Nations (ITT)
1st Postnord Vårgårda WestSweden TTT (TTT)
2nd Time trial, UEC European Championships
4th Overall Setmana Ciclista Valenciana

1st Stage 2

7th Paris–Roubaix
2024
1st Stage 1 (TTT) La Vuelta Femenina
1st Stage 1 (ITT) Tour de Normandie
1st Stage 3 (ITT) Vuelta Extremadura
1st Tijdrit Omloop van Borsele (ITT)
2nd Time trial, UEC European Championships
5th Overall Simac Ladies Tour
6th Paris–Roubaix
8th UCI Road World Championships – Women's time trial
2025
1st Overall Vuelta a Extremadura

1st Stage 1a (ITT)

2nd Amstel Gold Race
8th Tour of Flanders

===== General classification results timeline =====
Stage race	2005	2006	2007	2008	2009	2010	2011	2012	2013	2014	2015	2016	2017	2018	2019	2020	2021	2022	2024	2025
Grand Prix Elsy Jacobs	—	—	—	—	—	—	—	—	—	4	—	11	—	—	—	NH	—	—	—	—
Emakumeen Euskal Bira	—	—	—	—	—	DNF	74	11	13	22	DNF	—	—	—	—	NH	Not held			
The Women's Tour	Did not exist									14	—	13	5	12	15	NH	—	23	—	
Thüringen Rundfahrt	—	—	—	—	DNF	38	—	—	DNF	—	—	3	2	2	6	NH	35	—	—	
Giro d'Italia Femminile	—	—	—	—	—	DNF	94	—	24	26	23	—	—	33	—	27	35	—	—	
Belgium Tour	Did not exist							1	1	—	—	—	—	—	—	NH	2	—	NH	
Tour of Norway	Did not exist								—	—	—	—	3	—	—	NH	—	Not held		
Holland Ladies Tour	58	27	18	—	21	3	DNF	12	1	3	3	2	3	2	DNF	NH	3	—	5	
Giro della Toscana	—	36	—	DNF	DNF	—	—	—	—	—	—	—	—	—	—	NH	—	—	—´	

==== Classics results timeline ====
Monuments results timeline
Monument	2006	2007	2008	2009	2010	2011	2012	2013	2014	2015	2016	2017	2018	2019	2020	2021	2022	2024
Tour of Flanders	DNF	40	—	—	62	OTL	6	2	1	24	6	18	7	5	17	21	31	—
Paris–Roubaix	Did not exist														NH	32	7	6
Liege–Bastogne–Liege	Did not exist											4	5	13	13	—	—	69
Classics results timeline
Classic	2006	2007	2008	2009	2010	2011	2012	2013	2014	2015	2016	2017	2018	2019	2020	2021	2022	2024
Omloop Het Nieuwsblad	—	6	—	—	—	—	2	6	13	2	27	4	18	21	5	33	17	—
Strade Bianche	Did not exist									—	—	—	9	16	17	10	—	—
Ronde van Drenthe	—	15	61	40	21	68	—	2	7	3	—	12	10	3	NH	DNF	17	—
Trofeo Alfredo Binda	—	—	—	—	—	—	48	3	8	8	—	19	—	—	NH	—	20	—
Gent–Wevelgem	Did not exist						—	—	—	—	8	33	23	76	26	20	42	39
Amstel Gold Race	Did not exist											10	25	36	NH	—	31	44
La Flèche Wallonne	—	—	—	—	—	—	—	6	10	36	38	16	32	—	—	—	51	—

===== Major championships results =====
Event		2006	2007	2008	2009	2010	2011	2012	2013	2014	2015	2016	2017	2018	2019	2020	2021	2022	2024
Olympic Games	Time trial	Not held		—	Not held			8	Not held			4	Not held				—	NH	11
Olympic Games	Road race	Not held		—	Not held			OTL	Not held			21	Not held				—	NH	58
World Championships	Time trial	—	17	20	20	—	6	5	1	7	7	2	5	3	—	3	1	1	8
World Championships	Road race	—	—	—	—	—	—	DNF	16	29	10	85	15	60	—	19	18	24	—
World Championships	Team time trial	Did not exist						1	1	5	2	1	1	3	Not held				
World Championships	Team relay	Did not exist													—	NH	2	5	—
European Championships	Time trial	Did not exist										1	1	1	1	2	2	2	2
European Championships	Road race	Did not exist										—	61	19	—	—	1	42	57
European Games	Time trial	Event did not exist									1	Not held			—	Not held			
European Games	Road race	Event did not exist									4	Not held			—	Not held			
National Championships	Time trial	7	1	4	3	7	2	1	1	2	2	DNS	2	1	2	NH	2	1	—
National Championships	Road race	26	18	20	—	9	16	11	—	DNF	35	12	24	5	7	5	22	7	—

Legend
—	Did not compete
DNF	Did not finish
NH	Not held
OTL	Outside time limit

==== Track ====
2008
2nd Team pursuit, UCI World Cup Classics, Copenhagen
2009
UCI World Cup Classics, Copenhagen

1st Individual pursuit
1st Points race
2nd Team pursuit

2011
1st Team pursuit, UCI World Cup, Astana
Dutch National Record, UCI World Cup (Team pursuit, 3:23.179)
Dutch National Record, (Team pursuit, 3:21.550)
2012
Dutch National Record, Olympic Games (Team pursuit, 3:20.013)

===== Major championships results =====
Event		2006	2007	2008	2009	2010	2011	2012
Olympic Games	Team pursuit	Not held		—	Not held			6
World Championships	Individual pursuit	—	—	5	6	5	5	—
World Championships	Points race	—	—	—	15	8	—	—
World Championships	Scratch	—	—	1	6	—	—	—
World Championships	Team pursuit	—	—	6	4	5	5	—
European Championships	Individual pursuit	—	—	—	—	—	—	—
European Championships	Omnium	—	—	2	—	9	—	—
European Championships	Points race	—	—	—	—	—	—	—
European Championships	Scratch	—	—	—	—	—	—	—
European Championships	Team pursuit	—	—	—	—	9	5	—
National Championships	Individual pursuit	3	1	1	—	1	1	—
National Championships	Madison	—	—	—	—	2	1	—
National Championships	Omnium	—	—	—	—	2	—	—
National Championships	Points race	9	4	4	—	3	—	—
National Championships	Scratch	—	4	2	—	3	6	—

Legend
—	Did not compete
DNF	Did not finish

=== National team pursuit records ===
The women's 3000 m team pursuit track cycling discipline was introduced at the 2007–08 track cycling season. The Dutch team consisting of Ellen van Dijk, Marlijn Binnendijk and Yvonne Hijgenaar rode the team pursuit for the first time at Round 4 at the 2007–08 UCI Track Cycling World Cup in Copenhagen in a time of 3:36.901 (49.792 km/h). They broke the record later that day. After have ridden the team pursuit for the first time, the record has been broken nine times. Van Dijk is the only woman who always has been part of the squad when a record was broken. The current record was settled during the 2012 Summer Olympics by Van Dijk, Kirsten Wild and Vera Koedooder in a time of 3:20.013 (53.996 km/h) on 4 August 2012. After the 2011–12 track cycling season the UCI changed the discipline into a 4000 m team pursuit with 4 riders.

3000 m team pursuit Dutch national records by Ellen van Dijk
Time	Speed (km/h)	Cyclists	Event	Location of race	Date	Ref
3:36.901	49.792	Ellen van Dijk; Marlijn Binnendijk; Yvonne Hijgenaar	2007–08 UCI Track Cycling World Cup Classics – Round 4 (qualification)	(Denmark) Copenhagen	17 February 2008	
3:32.666	50.783	Ellen van Dijk; Marlijn Binnendijk; Yvonne Hijgenaar	2007–08 UCI Track Cycling World Cup Classics – Round 4 (gold-medal race)	(Denmark) Copenhagen	17 February 2008	
3:31.596	51.040	Ellen van Dijk; Marlijn Binnendijk; Elise van Hage	2008 UCI Track Cycling World Championships (qualifying)	(United Kingdom) Manchester	28 March 2008	
3:31.045	51.250	Ellen van Dijk; Amy Pieters; Vera Koedooder	2008–09 UCI Track Cycling World Cup Classics – Round 5 (qualification)	(Denmark) Copenhagen	15 February 2009	
3:29.730	51.494	Ellen van Dijk; Amy Pieters; Vera Koedooder	2008–09 UCI Track Cycling World Cup Classics – Round 5 (gold-medal race)	(Denmark) Copenhagen	15 February 2009	
3:29.379	51.581	Ellen van Dijk; Amy Pieters; Vera Koedooder	2009 UCI Track Cycling World Championships (bronze-medal race)	(Poland) Pruszków	26 March 2009	
3:25.156	52.642	Ellen van Dijk; Amy Pieters; Vera Koedooder	2010 UCI Track Cycling World Championships (qualifying)	(Denmark) Ballerup	25 March 2010	
3:23.179	53.155	Ellen van Dijk; Kirsten Wild; Vera Koedooder	2010–11 UCI Track Cycling World Cup Classics – Round 4 (qualifying)	(United Kingdom) Manchester	18 February 2011	
3:21.550	53.584	Ellen van Dijk; Kirsten Wild; Amy Pieters	2011–12 UCI Track Cycling World Cup – Round 1 (gold-medal race)	(Kazakhstan) Astana	4 November 2011	
3:20.013	53.996	Ellen van Dijk; Kirsten Wild; Vera Koedooder	2012 Summer Olympics (first round)	(United Kingdom) London	4 August 2012	

=== Individual records ===
Speed skating
Distance	Time	Date	Ice Rink
500 meter	43.72	30 October 2006	Thialf, Heerenveen
1000 meter	1:26.41	5 February 2005	De Smelt, Assen
1500 meter	2:09.00	4 November 2005	Thialf, Heerenveen
3000 meter	4:27.05	18 March 2005	Thialf, Heerenveen
5000 meter	7:41.93	17 March 2006	Thialf, Heerenveen

Track cycling
Discipline	Time	Date	Event	Velodrome
Individual pursuit (3000 m)	3:32.505	27 March 2008	Track Cycling World Championships	Manchester Velodrome
Team pursuit (3000 m)	3:20.013 NR	4 August 2012	Olympic Games	London Velodrome

== Notes ==
Sporting positions
Preceded by Yumari González (CUB)	Track Cycling World Champion (scratch race); 2008	Succeeded by Yumari González (CUB)
Preceded by Judith Arndt (GER)	Road Cycling World Champion (time trial); 2013	Succeeded by Lisa Brennauer (GER)
Preceded by Inaugural event	Road Cycling World Champion (team time trial); Specialized–lululemon; 2012, 2013	Succeeded by Specialized–lululemon
