= 2007 Novilon Internationale Damesronde van Drenthe =

Race details
- Dates: 15 April 2007
- Stages: 1
- Distance: 138.5 km (86.06 mi)
- Winning time: 3h 23' 08"

Results
	Winner	Giorgia Bronzini (Italy)	(Italy national team)
	Second	Marianne Vos (Netherlands)	(Team DSB Bank)
	Third	Ina-Yoko Teutenberg (Germany)	(T-Mobile Women)

The 2007 Novilon Internationale Damesronde van Drenthe (2007 Novilon international women's tour of Drenthe) was the 9th running of the Damesronde van Drenthe, a women's bicycle race in Drenthe, Netherlands. It was held on 15 April 2007 over a distance of 138.5 kilometres (86.1 miles). It was rated by the UCI as a 1.1 category race.

== Results ==
	Cyclist	Team	Time
1	Giorgia Bronzini (ITA)	Italy national team	3h 23' 08"
2	Marianne Vos (NED)	Team DSB Bank	s.t.
3	Ina-Yoko Teutenberg (GER)	T-Mobile Women	s.t.
4	Rochelle Gilmore (AUS)	Menikini-Selle Italia-Gysko	s.t.
5	Kirsten Wild (NED)	AA-Drink Cycling Team	s.t.
6	Moniek Rotmensen (NED)	Vrienden van het Platteland	s.t.
7	Ellen van Dijk (NED)	Vrienden van het Platteland	s.t.
8	Tanja Hennes (GER)	Bigla Cycling Team	s.t.
9	Anita Valen (NOR)	Vrienden van het Platteland	s.t.
10	Alessandra D'Ettorre (ITA)	Saccarelli Emu Sea Marsciano	s.t.

s.t. = same time
