= 2021 European Road Championships – Women's elite time trial =

Women's elite time trial
2021 European Road Championships

Race details
- Dates: 9 September 2021
- Stages: 1
- Distance: 22.4 km (13.92 mi)

Medalists
	Gold	Marlen Reusser (SUI)
	Silver	Ellen van Dijk (NED)
	Bronze	Lisa Brennauer (GER)

The women's elite time trial at the 2021 European Road Championships took place on 9 September 2021, in Trentino, Italy. Nations were allowed to enter a maximum of 2 riders into the event.

== Results ==
Rank	#	Cyclist	Nation	Time	Diff.
1st place, gold medalist(s)	32	Marlen Reusser	Switzerland	27:12.95	
2nd place, silver medalist(s)	33	Ellen van Dijk	Netherlands	27:32.26	+00:19.31
3rd place, bronze medalist(s)	31	Lisa Brennauer	Germany	28:15.22	+01:02.27
4	9	Lisa Klein	Germany	28:35.03	+01:22.08
5	11	Riejanne Markus	Netherlands	28:56.13	+01:43.18
6	23	Valeriya Kononenko	Ukraine	29:04.75	+01:51.80
7	26	Anna Kiesenhofer	Austria	29:12.60	+01:59.64
8	30	Vittoria Bussi	Italy	29:21.82	+02:08.87
9	21	Sara Van de Vel	Belgium	29:25.99	+02:13.04
10	16	Emma Norsgaard Jørgensen	Denmark	29:30.50	+02:17.55
11	25	Nathalie Eklund	Sweden	29:38.34	+02:25.39
12	27	Alena Amialiusik	Belarus	29:41.18	+02:28.23
13	3	Ann-Sophie Duyck	Belgium	29:43.26	+02:30.31
14	7	Aurela Nerlo	Poland	29:44.72	+02:31.77
15	29	Audrey Cordon-Ragot	France	29:48.86	+02:35.90
16	22	Katrine Aalerud	Norway	29:51.70	+02:38.75
17	18	Tamara Dronova	Russia	29:53.40	+02:40.45
18	24	Omer Shapira	Israel	29:54.63	+02:41.68
19	28	Karolina Karasiewicz	Poland	30:01.54	+02:48.59
20	10	Elise Chabbey	Switzerland	30:02.74	+02:49.79
21	4	Hanna Solovey	Ukraine	30:13.83	+03:00.88
22	14	Dana Rožlapa	Latvia	30:15.24	+03:02.29
23	20	Eugenia Bujak	Slovenia	30:19.01	+03:06.06
24	6	Gabriela Erharter	Austria	30:30.76	+03:17.81
25	8	Elena Cecchini	Italy	30:42.76	+03:29.81
26	2	Tatiana Antoshina	Russia	30:50.84	+03:37.89
27	5	Rotem Gafinovitz	Israel	30:56.67	+03:43.71
28	13	Claire Faber	Luxembourg	31:00.79	+03:47.84
29	17	Lourdes Oyarbide	Spain	31:22.87	+04:09.92
30	15	Hafdís Sigurðardóttir	Iceland	31:37.36	+04:24.41
31	1	Gloria Rodríguez	Spain	32:04.58	+04:51.63
32	19	Viktorija Senkutė	Lithuania	32:18.76	+05:05.80
33	12	Tereza Medveďová	Slovakia	33:28.85	+06:15.90
