= Nicole Steigenga =

Dutch cyclist (born 1998)

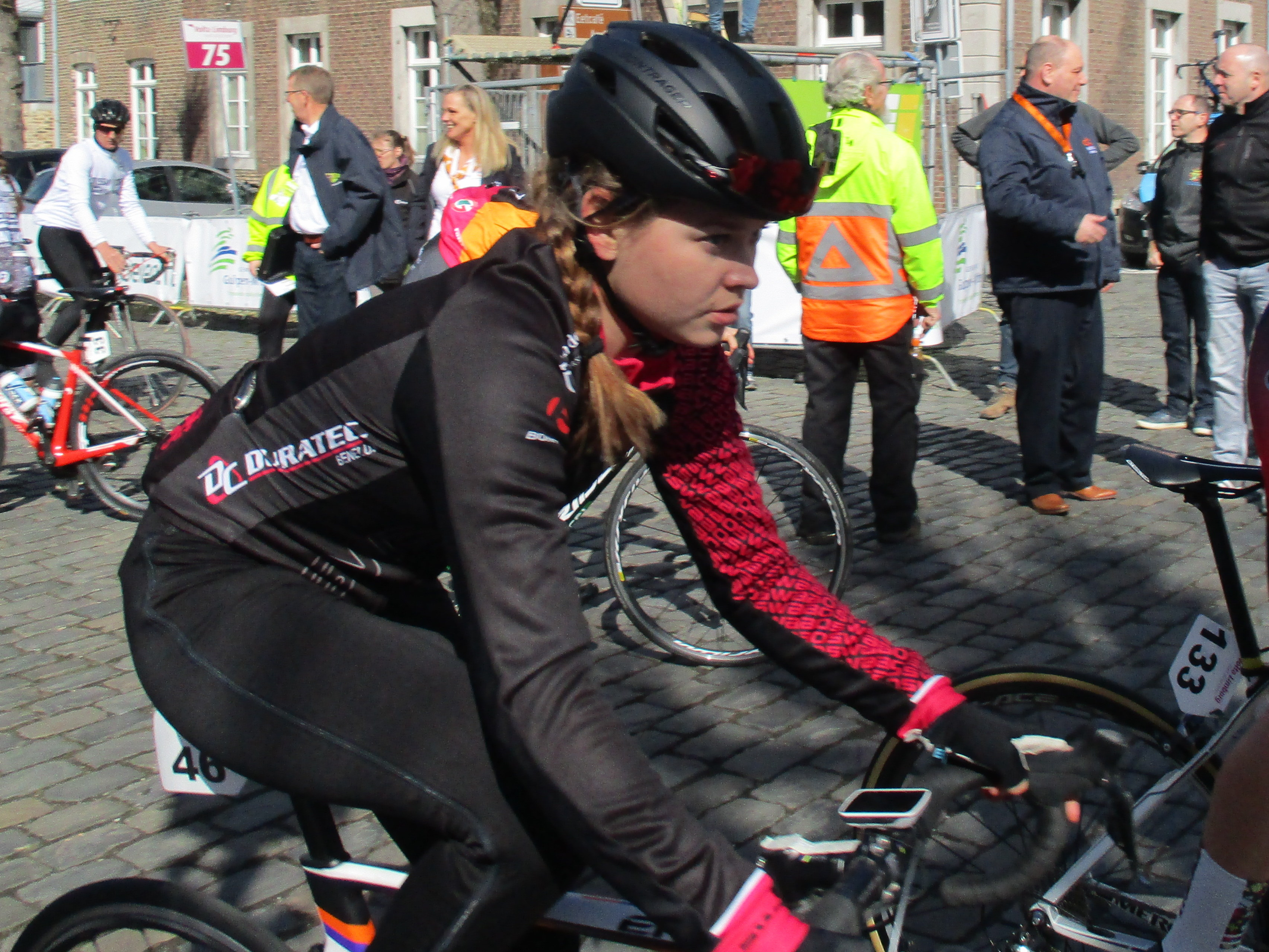
- Nicole Steigenga in 2018

Personal information
- Full name: Nicole Steigenga
- Born: 27 January 1998 (age 28) Sneek, Netherlands

Cycling career
- Sport: Cycling
- Current team: AG Insurance–Soudal
- Discipline: Road
- Role: Rider

Amateur team
- 2018: Swaboladies.nl

Professional teams
- 2017: Parkhotel Valkenburg–Destil
- 2018–2019: Bepink
- 2020–2021: Doltcini–Van Eyck Sport
- 2022: Team Coop–Hitec Products
- 2023–: AG Insurance–Soudal–Quick-Step

Nicole Steigenga (born 27 January 1998) is a Dutch racing cyclist, who currently rides for UCI Women's WorldTeam AG Insurance–Soudal. She rode for Bepink in the women's team time trial event at the 2018 UCI Road World Championships.

== Major results ==
2021
1st Rushes classification Tour Cycliste Féminin International de l'Ardèche
2022
2nd Ronde de Mouscron
2nd Leiedal Koerse
7th Overall Bloeizone Fryslân Tour
2025
5th Antwerp Port Epic
