= 2021 UCI Road World Championships – Women's time trial =

Cycling race

Women's time trial
2021 UCI Road World Championships
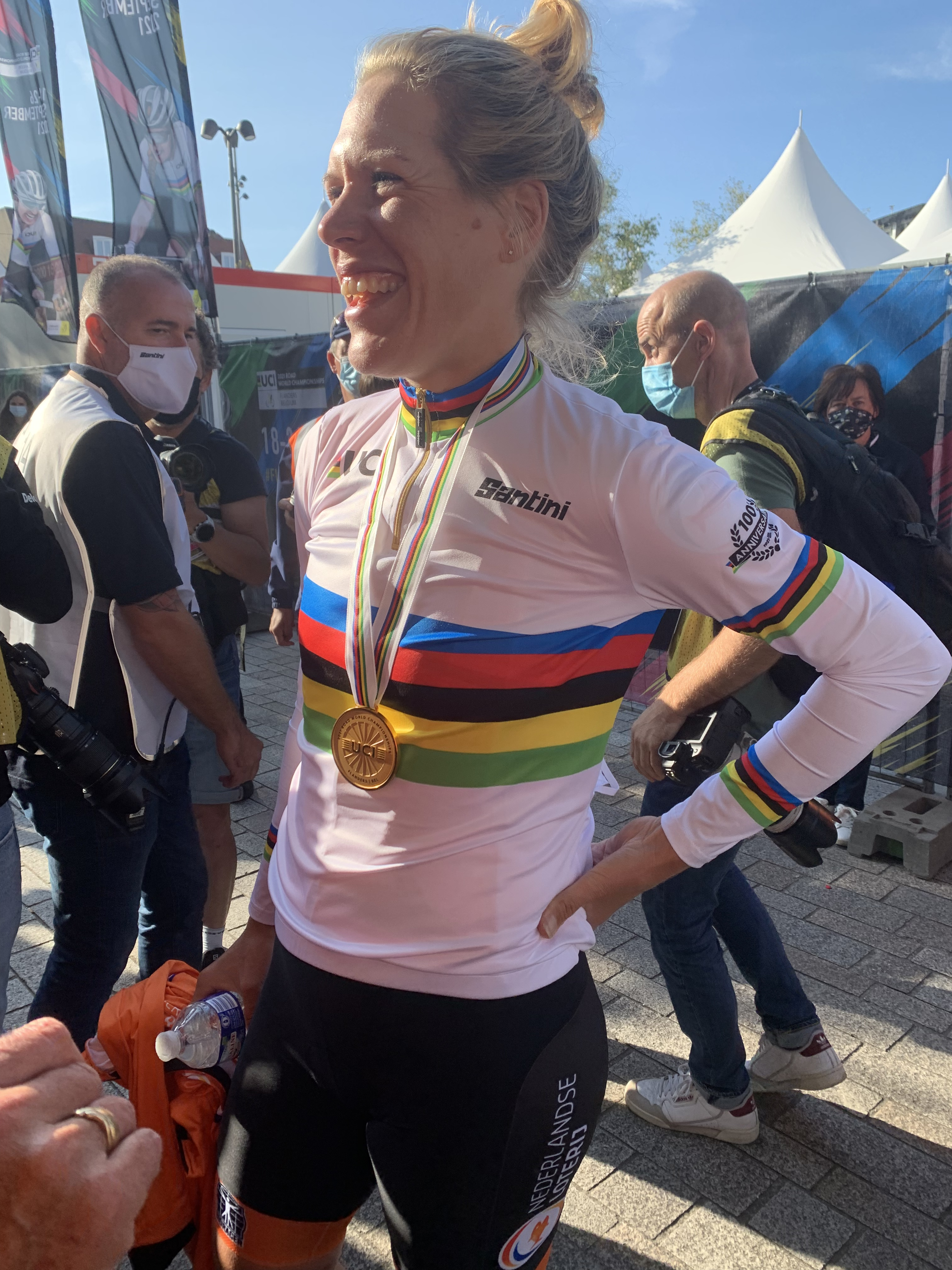

Race details
- Dates: 20 September 2021
- Stages: 1
- Distance: 30.3 km (18.8 mi)
- Winning time: 36' 05"

Medalists
	Gold	(Netherlands) Ellen van Dijk (NED)
	Silver	(Switzerland) Marlen Reusser (SUI)
	Bronze	(Netherlands) Annemiek van Vleuten (NED)

The Women's time trial of the 2021 UCI Road World Championships was a cycling event that took place on 20 September 2021 from Knokke-Heist to Bruges, Belgium. Anna van der Breggen was the defending champion. The race was won by Ellen van Dijk of the Netherlands, with Marlen Reusser finishing second, and Annemiek van Vleuten finishing third.

== Final classification ==
50 cyclists were listed to start the 30.3-kilometre (18.8 mi)-long course.

Rank	Rider	Country	Time
1st place, gold medalist(s)	Ellen van Dijk	Netherlands	36' 05"
2nd place, silver medalist(s)	Marlen Reusser	Switzerland	+ 10"
3rd place, bronze medalist(s)	Annemiek van Vleuten	Netherlands	+ 24"
4	Amber Neben	United States	+ 1' 24"
5	Lisa Brennauer	Germany	+ 1' 29"
6	Juliette Labous	France	+ 1' 47"
7	Lisa Klein	Germany	+ 1' 51"
8	Joscelin Lowden	United Kingdom	+ 1' 59"
9	Riejanne Markus	Netherlands	+ 1' 59"
10	Alena Amialiusik	Belarus	+ 2' 18"
11	Leah Kirchmann	Canada	+ 2' 34"
12	Emma Norsgaard	Denmark	+ 2' 43"
13	Karol-Ann Canuel	Canada	+ 2' 48"
14	Leah Thomas	United States	+ 2' 50"
15	Valeriya Kononenko	Ukraine	+ 2' 50"
16	Audrey Cordon-Ragot	France	+ 2' 56"
17	Anna Kiesenhofer	Austria	+ 2' 56"
18	Nathalie Eklund	Sweden	+ 2' 57"
19	Eugenia Bujak	Slovenia	+ 2' 58"
20	Karolina Karasiewicz	Poland	+ 3' 03"
21	Marta Jaskulska	Poland	+ 3' 06"
22	Julie Van de Velde	Belgium	+ 3' 06"
23	Omer Shapira	Israel	+ 3' 15"
24	Vittoria Guazzini	Italy	+ 3' 17"
25	Pfeiffer Georgi	United Kingdom	+ 3' 18"
26	Ganna Solovei	Ukraine	+ 3' 30"
27	Katrine Aalerud	Norway	+ 3' 30"
28	Dana Rožlapa	Latvia	+ 3' 38"
29	Elena Pirrone	Italy	+ 4' 07"
30	Sara Van de Vel	Belgium	+ 4' 07"
31	Rebecca Koerner	Denmark	+ 4' 08"
32	Rotem Gafinovitz	Israel	+ 4' 18"
33	Tamara Dronova	Russia	+ 4' 21"
34	Lina Hernández	Colombia	+ 4' 22"
35	Ziortza Isasi	Spain	+ 4' 30"
36	Fernanda Yapura	Argentina	+ 4' 33"
37	Agusta Edda Bjornsdóttir	Iceland	+ 4' 53"
38	Frances Janse van Rensburg	South Africa	+ 5' 15"
39	Yanina Kuskova	Uzbekistan	+ 5' 19"
40	Hayley Preen	South Africa	+ 5' 36"
41	Daniela Campos	Portugal	+ 5' 47"
42	Yeny Lorena Colmenares	Colombia	+ 6' 15"
43	Phetdarin Somrat	Thailand	+ 6' 48"
44	Bríet Kristý Gunnarsdóttir	Iceland	+ 7' 07"
45	Luciana Roland	Argentina	+ 7' 39"
46	Adyam Tesfalem	Eritrea	+ 8' 43"
47	Diane Ingabire	Rwanda	+ 9' 12"
48	Kanza Malik	Pakistan	+ 14' 18"
49	Asma Jan	Pakistan	+ 15' 44"
	Olga Zabelinskaya	Uzbekistan	DNS
