= Riejanne Markus =

Dutch cyclist (born 1994)

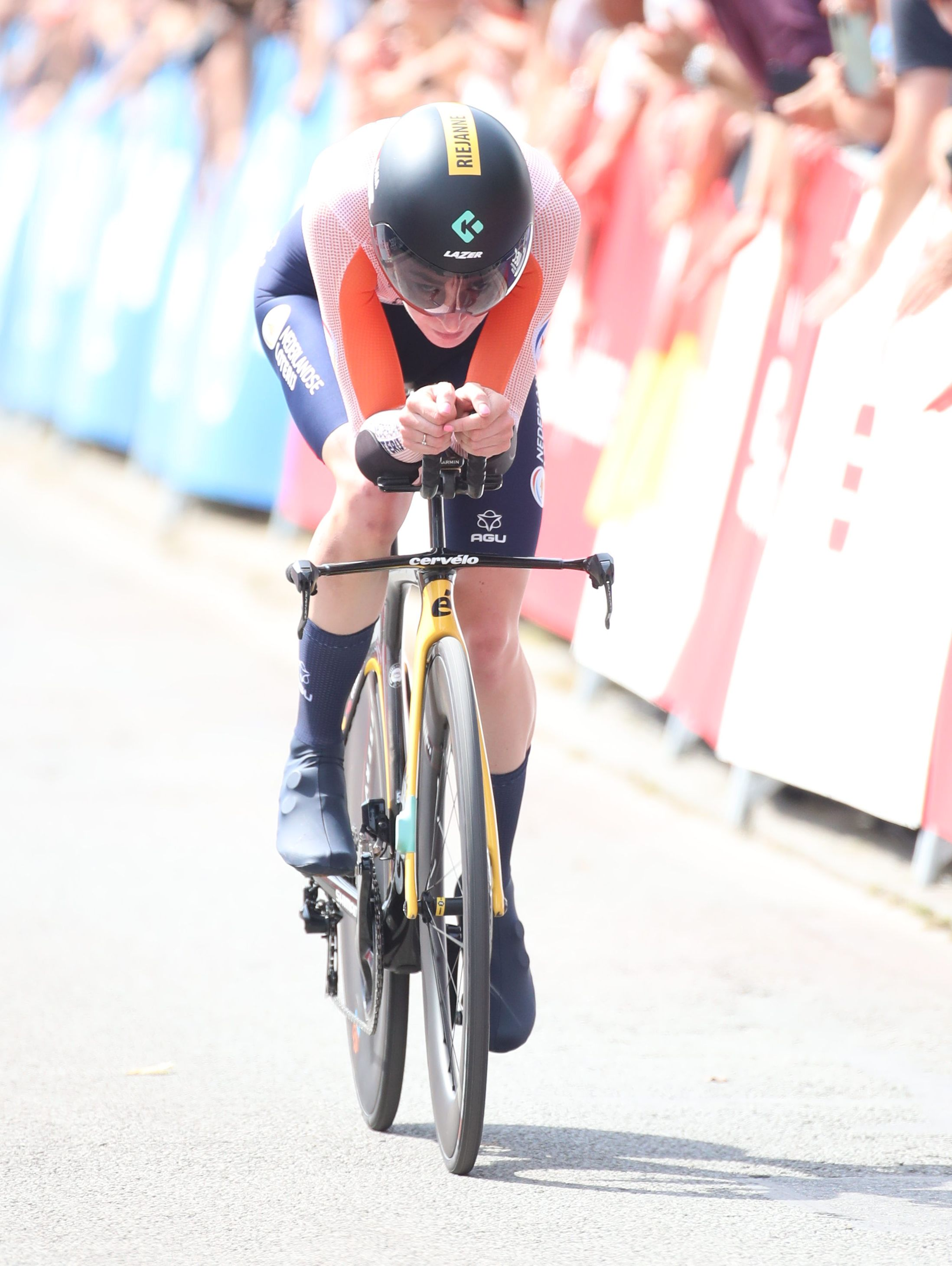
- Markus, 2022

Personal information
- Full name: Riejanne Ockeloen-Markus
- Born: 1 September 1994 (age 32) Diemen, Netherlands
- Height: 1.81 m (5 ft 11 in)
- Weight: 61 kg (134 lb)

Cycling career
- Sport: Cycling
- Current team: Lidl–Trek
- Disciplines: Road; Mountain biking (beach race)
- Role: Rider
- Rider type: All-rounder

Professional teams
- 2013–2015: Parkhotel Valkenburg Cycling Team
- 2016: Team Liv–Plantur
- 2017–2020: WM3 Energie
- 2021–2024: Team Jumbo–Visma
- 2025–: Lidl–Trek

Major wins
- Single-day races and Classics National Road Race Championships (2022) National Time Trial Championships (2023, 2024)
Medal record
Women's road bicycle racing
Representing the Netherlands
World Championships
Gold medal – first place	2019 Yorkshire	Mixed team relay
Silver medal – second place	2021 Flanders	Mixed team relay
European Championships
Gold medal – first place	2019 Alkmaar	Mixed team relay
Bronze medal – third place	2022 Munich	Time trial

Riejanne Ockeloen-Markus (born 1 September 1994) is a Dutch professional racing cyclist, who currently rides for UCI Women's WorldTeam Lidl–Trek. In 2022, Markus won the Dutch National Road Race Championships. A year later she won the Dutch National Time Trial Championships, beating Demi Vollering and Annemiek van Vleuten. Markus is the older sister of SD Worx rider Femke Markus, but they are not related to Barry Markus and his sister Kelly Markus. On 21 October 2023 she married Dutch cyclist, beachracer and gravel specialist Jasper Ockeloen.

== Major results ==
=== Road ===
2015
5th Road race, UEC European Under-23 Championships
7th Parel van de Veluwe
2016
5th Overall BeNe Ladies Tour
9th Team time trial, Crescent Vårgårda UCI Women's WorldTour
10th Overall Giro del Trentino Alto Adige-Südtirol
2017
1st Overall Gracia–Orlová

1st Stages 1 & 3 (ITT)

1st Omloop van Borsele
5th 7-Dorpenomloop Aalburg
7th Team time trial, Crescent Vårgårda UCI Women's WorldTour
2018
4th Amstel Gold Race
5th Team time trial, Tour of Norway
6th Team time trial, Crescent Vårgårda UCI Women's WorldTour
7th Overall Belgium Tour
9th Overall Healthy Ageing Tour
2019
1st Team relay, UCI World Championships
1st Team relay, UEC European Championships
5th Time trial, National Championships
6th Overall Grand Prix Elsy Jacobs
8th Crescent Vårgårda UCI Women's WorldTour
9th Overall Tour of Norway
2021
2nd UCI Road World Championships – Mixed team relay
5th Time trial, UEC European Championships
5th Time trial, National Championships
7th Overall Tour of Norway

1st Stage 2

9th UCI Road World Championships – Women's time trial
9th Overall Festival Elsy Jacobs
2022
National Championships

1st Road race
2nd Time trial

2nd Overall Bloeizone Fryslân Tour
3rd Time trial, UEC European Championships
4th Simac Ladies Tour

1st Stage 4

2023
1st Clasica Femenina Navarra
1st Time trial, National Championships
4th Liège-Bastogne-Liège
4th Overall La Vuelta Femenina

1st Stage 1 (TTT)

8th Strade Bianche
9th UCI Road World Championships – Women's time trial
2024
1st Veenendaal–Veenendaal
1st Time trial, National Championships
2nd Overall La Vuelta Femenina
2025
5th Road race, UCI World Championships
2026
4th Overall Itzulia Women
Combativity award Stage 2 Tour de France

=== Mountain Bike ===
2017
1st Beach race, UEC European Championships
2018
2nd Beach race, UEC European Championships
2019
2nd Beach race, UEC European Championships
2021
2nd Beach race, UEC European Championships

Sporting positions
Preceded by Amy Pieters	Dutch National Road Race; Champion; 2022	Succeeded by Demi Vollering
