= 2006 Tour of Flanders for Women =

2006 Tour of Flanders
2006 UCI Women's Road World Cup, race 3 of 12

Race details
- Dates: 2 April 2006
- Distance: 112 km (70 mi)
- Winning time: 3h 16' 57"

Results
	Winner	Mirjam Melchers (NED)	(Buitenpoort - Flexpoint Team)
	Second	Christiane Soeder (AUT)	(Univega Pro Cycling Team)
	Third	Loes Gunnewijk (NED)	(Buitenpoort - Flexpoint Team)

The third running of the Tour of Flanders for Women, a women's road cycling race in Belgium, was held on 2 April 2006. The race started in Oudenaarde and finished in Meerbeke, taking in 12 climbs and covering a total distance of 112 kilometres (70 miles). It was the third round of the 2006 UCI Women's Road World Cup. Dutch rider Mirjam Melchers-Van Poppel won her second consecutive Tour of Flanders in a two-up sprint with Austrian Christiane Soeder.

== Race summary ==
159 riders started the race in Oudenaarde at 11:30. The peloton thinned out on the wet and slick cobbled sector of the Paddestraat at the 24 km mark, leaving only 50 riders at the front of the race. On the cobbled sector of the Haaghoek, after 69 km, Mirjam Melchers, Christiane Soeder, Edwige Pitel and Kimberly Anderson broke clear. Anderson was dropped 6 km later, on the Berendries climb, and the leading trio increased their lead to over a minute on the peloton as they addressed the Valkenberg, at 32 km from the finish. Melchers accelerated on the Valkenberg and dropped the other two, with Tenbosse, the Muur van Geraardsbergen and the Bosberg still to come.

Melchers crested the top of the Muur with a one-minute lead on Soeder, who left Pitel behind, but began to lose speed on the Bosberg. The Austrian set off in pursuit of Melchers and bridged across in Ninove, with two kilometres remaining. The race was decided in a two-up sprint in Meerbeke, with Melchers taking the honours before a worn-out Soeder. Dutchwoman Loes Gunnewijk broke clear from the chasing group and completed the podium at 53 seconds. Melchers would later say that she "experienced the race like a war".

== Result ==
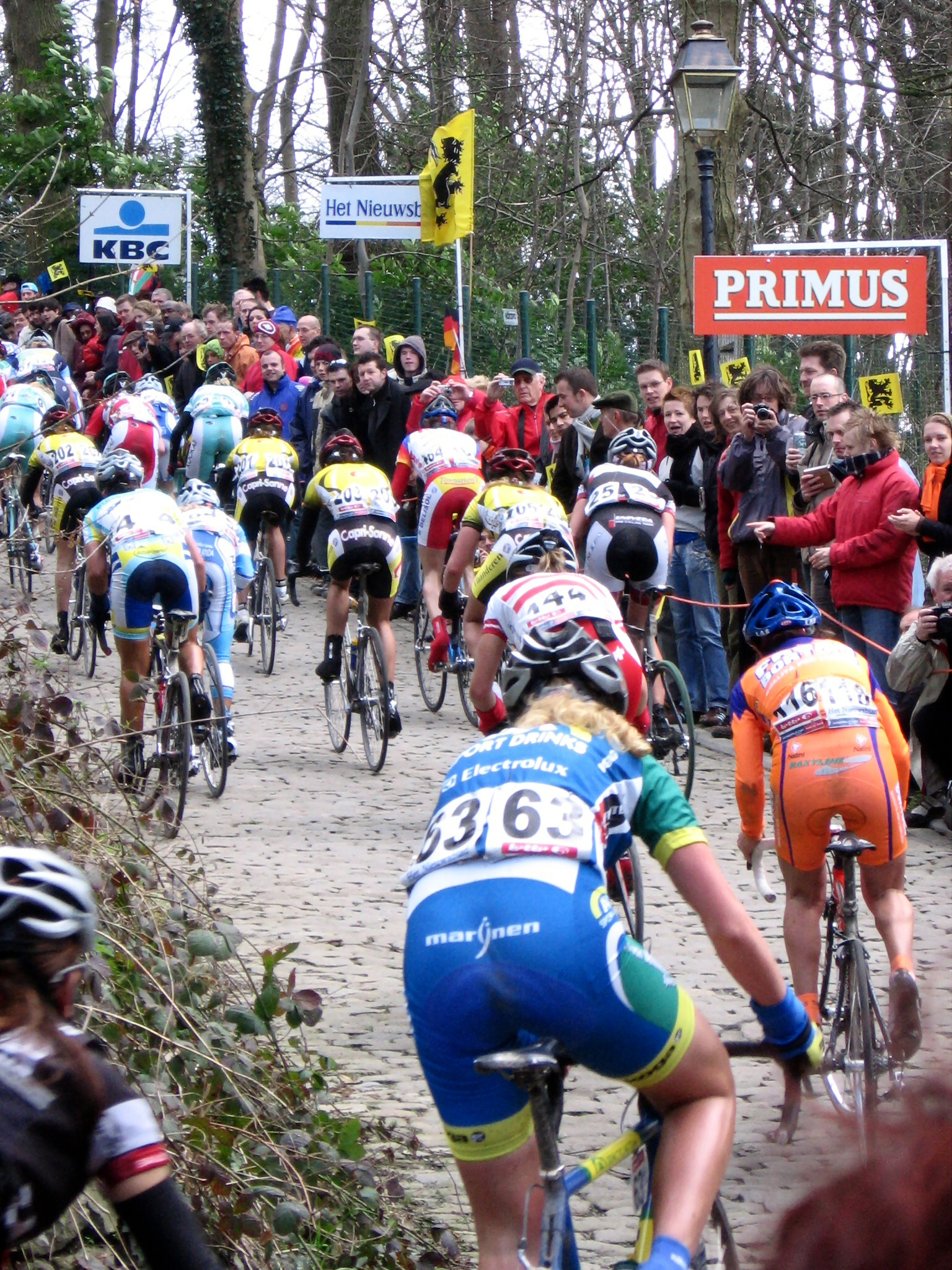
Josephine Groenveld (in blue) and Fabiana Luperini (in orange) in the back of the peloton on the Muur van Geraardsbergen during the 2006 race.

Result
Rank	Rider	Team	Time
1	Mirjam Melchers-Van Poppel (NED)	Buitenpoort - Flexpoint Team	3h 16' 57"
2	Christiane Soeder (AUT)	Univega Pro Cycling Team	+ 01"
3	Loes Gunnewijk (NED)	Buitenpoort - Flexpoint Team	+ 53"
4	Zulfiya Zabirova (RUS)	Bigla Cycling Team	+ 58"
5	Edwige Pitel (FRA)	Bianchi Alverti Kookai	s.t.
6	Nicole Cooke (GBR)	Univega Pro Cycling Team	+ 1' 20"
7	Theresa Senff (GER)	AA-Drink Cycling Team	s.t.
8	Susanne Ljungskog (SWE)	Buitenpoort - Flexpoint Team	s.t.
9	Judith Arndt (GER)	T-Mobile Professional Cycling	s.t.
10	Sharon Van Dromme (BEL)	Vlaanderen-Capri Sonne-T-Interim	+ 1' 32"
