= Viktorija Senkutė =

Lithuanian rower (born 1996)

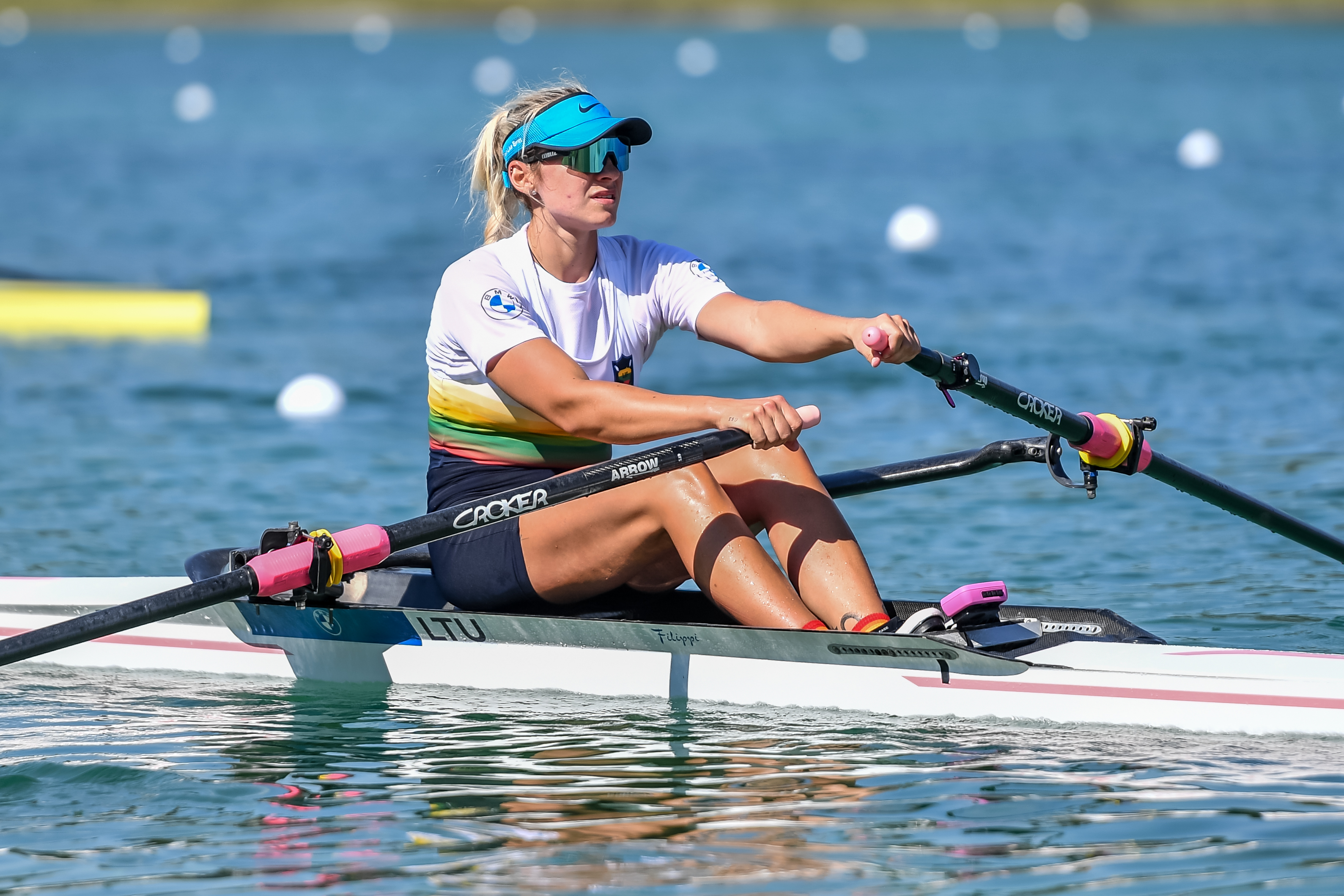
- Senkutė at the 2022 European Championships

Personal information
- Nationality: Lithuanian
- Born: 12 April 1996 (age 30) Trakai, Lithuania

Sport
- Sport: Rowing
- Event: Single sculls
Medal record
Women's rowing
Representing the Lithuania
Olympic Games
Bronze medal – third place	2024 Paris	Single sculls
European Championships
Silver medal – second place	2026 Varese	Single sculls

Viktorija Senkutė (born 12 April 1996) is a Lithuanian rower. She competed at the 2024 Paris Olympics, where she won the bronze medal in the single sculls event.

== Career ==
=== Rowing ===
From Trakai, in 2013 she competed in the U-18 World Youth Rowing Championships. Five years later she won bronze in the doubles sculls at the 2018 European Rowing U23 Championships.

After Senkutė finished 29th at the World Championships, the Lithuanian Rowing Federation ceased financial support for Viktorija, leading her to temporarily switch from rowing to cycling. However, with the election of Mindaugas Griškonis as the new president of the Lithuanian Rowing Federation, she returned to competitive rowing.

She reached the final of the single sculls competing at the 2024 Rowing World Cup in Lucerne, Switzerland. She competed in the single sculls at the 2024 Paris Olympics. She won her qualifying heat to reach the quarter-finals. In the final she finished third and become a first Lithuanian to win a medal in single sculls at the Olympics.

In 2024 Senkutė was nominated for the Sportswoman of the Year category at the Lithuanian National Sports Awards and won the Breakthrough of the Year award.

In May 2026, Senkute finished runner-up in a photo finish with Great Britain's Lauren Henry at the Rowing World Cup event in Seville, Spain. In August, she was runner-up to Henry again at the 2026 European Rowing Championships.

=== Cycling ===
She has also competed as a cyclist, and was runner-up at the 2021 Lithuanian National Time Trial Championships. She also placed fourth in the road race, in 2021. She also competed at the 2021 European Road Championships – Women's elite time trial in Trentino, Italy.

== Personal life ==
Viktorija Senkutė is dating Lithuanian Olympic canoeist Simonas Maldonis.

When she was 15 she was diagnosed with focal, or partial, epilepsy after she started experiencing convulsions during the night.
