= GT Krush Rebellease Pro Cycling =

Dutch cycling team

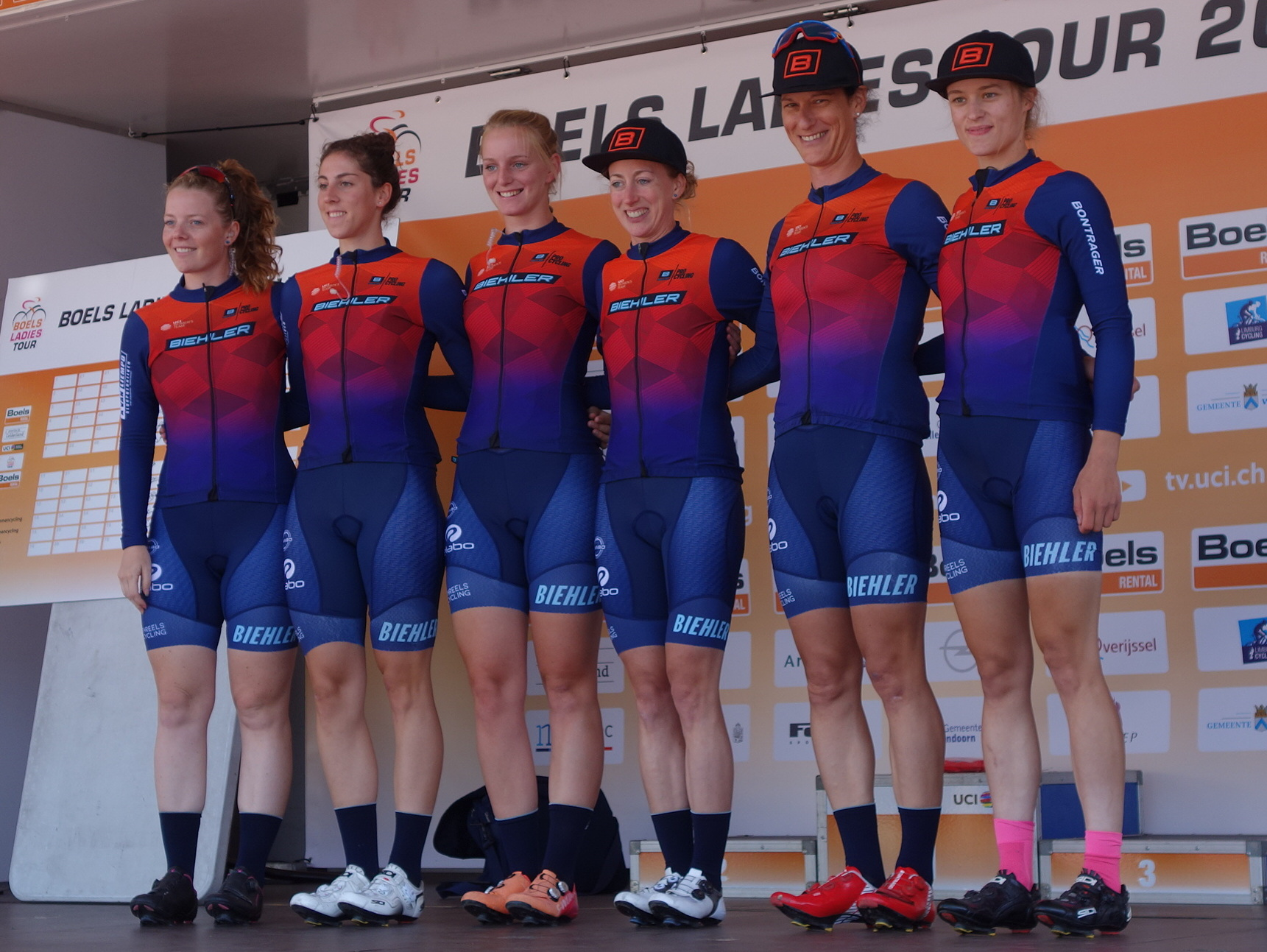

Team information
- UCI code: GKT
- Registered: Netherlands
- Founded: 2008
- Discipline: Road
- Status: National (2008–2018); UCI Women's Team (2019); UCI Women's Continental Team (2020–)
- Bicycles: Look

Key personnel
- Team managers: Wim Klement; Walter Geurts

Team name history
- 2008–2012 2013–2018 2018 2019 2020 2021–2022 2023–: Swabo Ladies Cycling Team; SwaboLadies.nl; Swabo Women Pro Cycling; Biehler Pro Cycling Team (BPC); Biehler Krush Pro Cycling (BKP); GT Krush Tunap; GT Krush Rebellease Pro Cycling

GT Krush Rebellease Pro Cycling is a professional road bicycle racing women's team which participates in elite women's races. The team was established in 2008 as Swabo Ladies Cycling Team, before gaining UCI status for the 2019 season.

The team also runs three development teams, aimed at training the next generation of riders: Swabo Women Development Team, Swabo Women U19 Development Team and Swabo Women U17 Development Team.

== Team roster ==
As of 22 January 2021.

Rider	Date of birth
Marissa Baks (NED)	5 December 1998 (age 27)
Inez Beijer (NED)	22 November 1995 (age 30)
Henrietta Colborne (GBR)	20 April 1998 (age 28)
Nathalie Eklund (SWE)	28 May 1991 (age 35)
Daniek Hengeveld (NED)	17 November 2002 (age 23)

Rider	Date of birth
Melanie Klement (NED)	3 May 1994 (age 32)
Clara Lundmark (SWE)	4 April 1999 (age 27)
Quinty Ton (NED)	4 August 1998 (age 28)
Melissa van Neck (CZE)	13 October 1991 (age 34)
Nienke Wasmus (NED)	23 October 1999 (age 26)

== Major results ==
2018
Stage 3 Setmana Ciclista Valenciana, Nicole Steigenga

== National champions ==
2021
Sweden Cyclo-cross, Nathalie Eklund
