= 2012 Dutch National Track Championships – Women's madison =

Women's madison
2012 Dutch National Track Championships

Race details
- Dates: 30 December 2012
- Stages: 1
- Distance: 25 km (15.53 mi)

Medalists
	Gold	Marianne Vos; Roxane Knetemann
	Silver	Laura van der Kamp; Kirsten Wild
	Bronze	Amy Pieters; Kelly Markus

The women's madison at the 2012 Dutch National Track Championships in Apeldoorn took place at Omnisport Apeldoorn on December 30, 2012. 9 teams participated in the contest.

== Competition format ==
Because of the number of teams, there were no qualification rounds for this discipline. Consequently, the event was run direct to the final. The competition consisted on 100 laps, making a total of 25 km.

== Preview ==
Ellen van Dijk who won the national madison title in 2011, together with Kirsten Wild, did not participate at the 2012 National Track Championships. Wild rode in this edition together with Laura van der Kamp.

== Results ==
The race started at 20:15.

Rank	Names
1st place, gold medalist(s)	Marianne Vos; Roxane Knetemann
2nd place, silver medalist(s)	Laura van der Kamp; Kirsten Wild
3rd place, bronze medalist(s)	Amy Pieters; Kelly Markus
4	Nina Kessler; Nicky Zijlaard
5	Vera Koedooder; Winanda Spoor
6	Aafke Eshuis; Natalie van Gogh
7	Daisy Rodenburg; Bianca Lust
8	Birgitta Roos; Samantha van Steenis
9	Judith Bloem; Kim van Dijk

Results from nkbaanwielrennen.nl.
