= Netherlands at the UCI Track Cycling World Cup =

- IOC code: NED
- NOC: KNWU
- Medals: Gold 41 Silver 40 Bronze 45 Total 126

The participation of the Netherlands at the UCI Track Cycling World Cup covers the history and results of Dutch athletes competing at the UCI Track Cycling World Cup.

== 1995 ==
Medal	Round	Name	Discipline
Bronze	Round 6, Manchester	Ingrid Haringa	Women's points race

== 1996 ==
Medal	Round	Name	Discipline
Bronze	Round 1, Cali	Van Hameren; Cornelius Post	Men's madison
Gold	Round 4, Garolfo	Peter Pieters; Cornelius Post	Men's madison

== 1997 ==
Medal	Round	Name	Discipline
Silver	Round 4, Quatro Sant’Elana	?	Men's team sprint
Bronze	Round 4, Quatro Sant’Elana	?	Men's madison

== 1998 ==
Medal	Round	Name	Discipline
Bronze	Round 4, Hyères	Leontien van Moorsel	Women's individual pursuit

== 1999 ==
Medal	Round	Name	Discipline
Bronze	Round 1, Mexico City	Leontien van Moorsel	Women's individual pursuit
Gold	Round 4, Fiorenzuola d'Arda	Leontien van Moorsel	Women's individual pursuit
Bronze	Final standings	Leontien van Moorsel	Women's individual pursuit

== 2000 ==
Medal	Round	Name	Discipline
Gold	Round 1, Moscow	Leontien van Moorsel	Women's individual pursuit
Bronze	Round 2, Cali	Robert Slippens	Men's individual pursuit
Gold	Round 3, Mexico City	Anouska van der Zee	Women's points race
Silver	Round 3, Mexico City	John Den Barber; Jens Mouris; Robert Slippens; Wilco Zuijderwijk	Men's team pursuit
Silver	Round 3, Mexico City	Wilco Zuijderwijk	Men's points race
Bronze	Round 3, Mexico City	Anouska van der Zee	Women's individual pursuit
Silver	Round 5, Ipoh	Teun Mulder	Men's 1 km time trial
Silver	Final standings	Teun Mulder	Men's 1 km time trial
Bronze	Final standings	Anouska van der Zee	Women's points race

== 2001 ==
Medal	Round	Name	Discipline
Gold	Round 2, Szczecin	Teun Mulder	Men's 1 km time trial
Gold	Round 2, Szczecin	Leontien van Moorsel	Women's individual pursuit
Gold	Round 2, Szczecin	Leontien van Moorsel	Women's points race
Silver	Round 2, Szczecin	Robert Slippens; Danny Stam	Men's madison
Bronze	Round 2, Szczecin	Mirella van Melis	Women's individual pursuit
Silver	Round 3, Pordenone	Anouska van der Zee	Women's individual pursuit
Silver	Round 4, Mexico City	?	Men's team pursuit
Silver	Round 4, Mexico City	Anouska van der Zee	Women's individual pursuit
Silver	Round 4, Mexico City	Anouska van der Zee	Women's points race
Bronze	Round 4, Mexico City	?	Men's madison
Bronze	Final standings	Anouska van der Zee	Women's individual pursuit

== 2002 ==
Medal	Round	Name	Discipline
Silver	Round 1, Monterrey	Robert Slippens	Men's scratch
Bronze	Round 1, Monterrey	Jens Mouris; Peter Schep; Robert Slippens; Wilco Zuijderwijk	Men's team pursuit
Gold	Round 2, Sydney	Robert Slippens	Men's scratch
Bronze	Round 2, Sydney	Robert Slippens; Danny Stam	Men's madison
Gold	Round 3, Moscow	Leontien van Moorsel	Women's individual pursuit
Silver	Round 4, Cali	Teun Mulder	Men's 1 km time trial
Bronze	Round 5, Kunming	Yvonne Hijgenaar	Women's 500 m time trial
Bronze	Round 5, Kunming	Adrie Visser	Women's scratch
Bronze	Final standings	Yvonne Hijgenaar	Women's 500 m time trial

== 2003 ==
Final standings missing

Medal	Round	Name	Discipline
Gold	Round 1, Moscow	Robert Slippens	Men's scratch
Silver	Round 1, Moscow	Theo Bos	Men's 1 km time trial
Silver	Round 1, Moscow	Robert Slippens; Danny Stam	Men's madison
Silver	Round 1, Moscow	Adrie Visser	Women's points race
Bronze	Round 1, Moscow	Adrie Visser	Women's scratch
Silver	Round 2, Aguascalientes	Anouska van der Zee; Yvonne Hijgenaar; Vera Koedooder	Women's team sprint
Bronze	Round 2, Aguascalientes	Vera Koedooder	Women's points race
Silver	Round 3, Cape Town	Martin Benjamin	Men's keirin
Bronze	Round 3, Cape Town	Jeroen Straathof	Men's scratch
Bronze	Round 3, Cape Town	Gideon de Jong; Geert Jan Jonkman	Men's madison
Bronze	Round 4, Sydney	Yvonne Hijgenaar	Women's 500 m time trial

== 2004 ==
Final standings missing

Medal	Round	Name	Discipline
Gold	Round 1, Moscow	Theo Bos	Men's 1 km time trial
Bronze	Round 1, Moscow	Theo Bos	Men's sprint
Bronze	Round 1, Moscow	Yvonne Hijgenaar	Women's 500 m time trial
Bronze	Round 1, Moscow	Yvonne Hijgenaar; Willy Kanis	Women's team sprint
Bronze	Round 2, Aguascalientes	Yvonne Hijgenaar	Women's 500 m time trial
Bronze	Round 2, Aguascalientes	Yvonne Hijgenaar; Willy Kanis	Women's team sprint
Gold	Round 3, Manchester	Yvonne Hijgenaar	Women's 500 m time trial
Silver	Round 3, Manchester	Theo Bos	Men's 1 km time trial
Silver	Round 3, Manchester	Levi Heimans; Jens Mouris; Peter Schep; Jeroen Straathof	Men's team sprint
Silver	Round 3, Manchester	Jan Bos; Theo Bos; Teun Mulder	Men's team pursuit
Gold	Round 4, Sydney	Robert Slippens	Men's scratch
Gold	Round 4, Sydney	Yvonne Hijgenaar	Women's 500 m time trial
Gold	Round 4, Sydney	Adrie Visser	Women's scratch
Silver	Round 4, Sydney	Levi Heimans; Jens Mouris; Peter Schep; Jeroen Straathof	Men's team pursuit
Bronze	Round 4, Sydney	Levi Heimans	Men's individual pursuit

== 2004–05 ==
Final standings missing

Medal	Round	Name	Discipline
Gold	Round 1, Moscow	Peter Schep	Men's points race
Silver	Round 1, Moscow	Jens Mouris; Peter Schep; Wim Stroetinga; Niki Terpstra	Men's team pursuit
Silver	Round 1, Moscow	Yvonne Hijgenaar	Women's 500 m time trial
Bronze	Round 1, Moscow	Teun Mulder	Men's sprint
Bronze	Round 1, Moscow	Jens Mouris	Men's individual pursuit
Bronze	Round 1, Moscow	Marlijn Binnendijk	Women's individual pursuit
Gold	Round 2, Los Angeles	Teun Mulder	Men's keirin
Gold	Round 2, Los Angeles	Theo Bos	Men's 1 km time trial
Gold	Round 2, Los Angeles	Theo Bos; Teun Mulder; Tim Veldt	Men's team sprint
Bronze	Round 2, Los Angeles	Yvonne Hijgenaar	Women's 500 m time trial
Bronze	Round 2, Los Angeles	Adrie Visser	Women's points race
Bronze	Round 3, Manchester	Levi Heimans	Men's individual pursuit
Gold	Round 4, Sydney	Theo Bos	Men's keirin
Gold	Round 4, Sydney	Theo Bos	Men's sprint
Gold	Round 4, Sydney	Wim Stroetinga	Men's scratch
Gold	Round 4, Sydney	Levi Heimans	Men's individual pursuit
Gold	Round 4, Sydney	Yvonne Hijgenaar	Women's 500 m time trial
Gold	Round 4, Sydney	Marlijn Binnendijk	Women's individual pursuit
Silver	Round 4, Sydney	Tim Veldt	Men's 1 km time trial
Bronze	Round 4, Sydney	Yvonne Hijgenaar	Women's sprint

== 2005–06 ==
Medal	Round	Name	Discipline
Gold	Round 1, Moscow	Jens Mouris	Men's individual pursuit
Gold	Round 2, Manchester	Theo Bos	Men's sprint
Gold	Round 2, Manchester	Adrie Visser	Women's scratch
Silver	Round 2, Manchester	Teun Mulder	Men's sprint
Silver	Round 2, Manchester	Peter Schep	Men's points race
Silver	Round 2, Manchester	Yvonne Hijgenaar	Women's 500 m time trial
Bronze	Round 2, Manchester	Theo Bos; Teun Mulder; Tim Veldt	Men's team sprint
Bronze	Round 2, Manchester	Tim Veldt	Men's 1 km time trial
Bronze	Round 2, Manchester	Levi Heimans	Men's individual pursuit
Bronze	Round 2, Manchester	Levi Heimans; Jens Mouris; Wim Stroetinga; Niki Terpstra	Men's team pursuit
Silver	Round 3, Carson	Tim Veldt	Men's 1 km time trial
Silver	Round 3, Carson	Teun Mulder	Men's keirin
Silver	Round 3, Carson	Levi Heimans; Jens Mouris; Geert-Jan Jonkman; Niki Terpstra	Men's team pursuit
Silver	Round 3, Carson	Jens Mouris; Niki Terpstra	Men's madison
Silver	Round 3, Carson	Jens Mouris	Men's individual pursuit
Bronze	Round 3, Carson	Yvonne Hijgenaar	Women's 500 m time trial
Gold	Round 4, Sydney	Theo Bos	Men's keirin
Gold	Round 4, Sydney	Niki Terpstra	Men's points race
Gold	Round 4, Sydney	Yvonne Hijgenaar	Women's 500 m time trial
Gold	Round 4, Sydney	Theo Bos; Teun Mulder; Tim Veldt	Men's team sprint
Gold	Final standings	Tim Veldt	Men's 1 km time trial
Gold	Final standings	Jens Mouris	Men's individual pursuit
Silver	Final standings	Netherlands	Men's madison
Silver	Final standings	Teun Mulder	Men's sprint
Silver	Final standings	Yvonne Hijgenaar	Women's 500 m time trial
Bronze	Final standings	Wim Stroetinga	Men's scratch
Bronze	Final standings	Netherlands	Men's team pursuit
Bronze	Final standings	Netherlands	Men's team sprint

== 2006–07 ==
Medal	Round	Name	Discipline
Gold	Round 1, Sydney	Theo Bos	Men's keirin
Gold	Round 1, Sydney	Vera Koedooder	Women's scratch
Silver	Round 1, Sydney	Theo Bos; Teun Mulder; Tim Veldt	Men's team sprint
Bronze	Round 1, Sydney	Tim Veldt	Men's 1 km time trial
Bronze	Round 1, Sydney	Wim Stroetinga	Men's scratch
Bronze	Round 1, Sydney	Teun Mulder	Men's sprint
Bronze	Round 1, Sydney	Yvonne Hijgenaar	Women's 500 m time trial
Gold	Round 2, Moscow	Jens Mouris; Danny Stam	Men's madison
Gold	Round 2, Moscow	Yvonne Hijgenaar; Willy Kanis	Women's team sprint
Gold	Round 2, Moscow	Theo Bos	Men's sprint
Silver	Round 2, Moscow	Teun Mulder	Men's keirin
Silver	Round 2, Moscow	Theo Bos; Teun Mulder; Tim Veldt	Men's team sprint
Gold	Round 3, Los Angeles	Yvonne Hijgenaar; Willy Kanis	Women's team sprint
Silver	Round 3, Los Angeles	Wim Stroetinga	Men's scratch
Silver	Round 3, Los Angeles	Willy Kanis	Women's 500 m time trial
Bronze	Round 3, Los Angeles	Adrie Visser	Women's scratch
Gold	Round 4, Manchester	Jens Mouris; Danny Stam	Men's madison
Gold	Round 4, Manchester	Yvonne Hijgenaar; Willy Kanis	Women's team sprint
Silver	Round 4, Manchester	Yvonne Hijgenaar	Women's 500 m time trial
Bronze	Round 4, Manchester	Tim Veldt	Men's 1 km time trial
Gold	Final standings	Yvonne Hijgenaar	Women's 500 m time trial
Gold	Final standings	Netherlands	Women's team sprint
Gold	Final standings	Netherlands	Men's madison
Silver	Final standings	Jens Mouris	Men's individual time trial
Bronze	Final standings	Tim Veldt	Men's 1 km time trial
Bronze	Final standings	Wim Stroetinga	Men's scratch

== 2007–08 ==
Medal	Round	Name	Discipline
Gold	Round 1, Sydney	Willy Kanis	Women's sprint
Gold	Round 1, Sydney	Peter Schep; Jens Mouris	Men's madison
Gold	Round 1, Sydney	Yvonne Hijgenaar; Willy Kanis	Women's team sprint
Bronze	Round 1, Sydney	Theo Bos	Men's keirin
Bronze	Round 1, Sydney	Willy Kanis	Women's 500 m time trial
Gold	Round 2, Beijing	Theo Bos	Men's sprint
Gold	Round 2, Beijing	Theo Bos; Teun Mulder; Tim Veldt	Men's team sprint
Gold	Round 2, Beijing	Willy Kanis	Women's keirin
Gold	Round 2, Beijing	Marianne Vos	Women's scratch
Gold	Round 2, Beijing	Marianne Vos	Women's points race
Gold	Round 2, Beijing	Yvonne Hijgenaar; Willy Kanis	Women's team sprint
Bronze	Round 2, Beijing	Teun Mulder	Men's keirin
Bronze	Round 2, Beijing	Levi Heimans; Jenning Huizenga; Jens Mouris; Peter Schep	Men's team pursuit
Gold	Round 3, Los Angeles	Yvonne Hijgenaar; Willy Kanis	Women's team sprint
Silver	Round 3, Los Angeles	Jenning Huizenga	Men's individual pursuit
Silver	Round 3, Los Angeles	Willy Kanis	Women's 500 m time trial
Silver	Round 3, Los Angeles	Willy Kanis	Women's keirin
Bronze	Round 3, Los Angeles	Teun Mulder	Men's sprint
Bronze	Round 3, Los Angeles	Wim Stroetinga	Men's scratch
Bronze	Round 3, Los Angeles	Willy Kanis	Women's sprint
Gold	Round 4, Copenhagen	Wim Stroetinga	Men's scratch
Gold	Round 4, Copenhagen	Pim Ligthart	Men's points race
Gold	Round 4, Copenhagen	Willy Kanis	Women's keirin
Gold	Round 4, Copenhagen	Willy Kanis	Women's sprint
Gold	Round 4, Copenhagen	Marianne Vos	Women's scratch
Silver	Round 4, Copenhagen	Ellen van Dijk; Yvonne Hijgenaar; Marlijn Binnendijk	Women's team pursuit
Silver	Round 4, Copenhagen	Theo Bos; Teun Mulder; Tim Veldt	Men's team sprint
Silver	Round 4, Copenhagen	Yvonne Hijgenaar; Willy Kanis	Women's team sprint
Bronze	Round 4, Copenhagen	Peter Schep; Wim Stroetinga	Men's madison
Gold	Final standings	Willy Kanis	Women's keirin
Gold	Final standings	Willy Kanis	Women's sprint
Gold	Final standings	Netherlands	Women's team sprint
Silver	Final standings	Wim Stroetinga	Men's scratch
Silver	Final standings	Netherlands	Men's madison
Silver	Final standings	Marianne Vos	Women's scratch
Bronze	Final standings	Netherlands	Men's team pursuit
Bronze	Final standings	Netherlands	Men's team sprint

== 2008–09 ==
Medal	Round	Name	Discipline
Gold	Round 1, Manchester	Wim Sroetinga	Men's scratch
Bronze	Round 1, Manchester	Teun Mulder	Men's keirin
Bronze	Round 1, Manchester	Ismaël Kip; Peter Schep; Wim Stroetinga; Arno van der Zwet	Men's team pursuit
Gold	Round 2, Melbourne	Willy Kanis	Women's keirin
Gold	Round 2, Melbourne	Willy Kanis	Women's 500 m time trial
Gold	Round 2, Melbourne	Yvonne Hijgenaar; Willy Kanis	Women's team sprint
Gold	Round 4, Beijing	Yvonne Hijgenaar; Willy Kanis	Women's team sprint
Bronze	Round 4, Beijing	Teun Mulder	Men's keirin
Bronze	Round 4, Beijing	Willy Kanis	Women's keirin
Bronze	Round 4, Beijing	Willy Kanis	Women's sprint
Gold	Round 5, Copenhagen	Ellen van Dijk	Women's individual pursuit
Gold	Round 5, Copenhagen	Ellen van Dijk	Women's points race
Silver	Round 5, Copenhagen	Ellen van Dijk; Amy Pieters; Vera Koedooder	Women's team pursuit
Silver	Round 5, Copenhagen	Vera Koedooder	Women's scratch
Bronze	Round 5, Copenhagen	Peter Schep; Pim Ligthart	Men's madison
Bronze	Round 5, Copenhagen	Willy Kanis	Women's 500 m time trial
Gold	Final standings	Willy Kanis	Women's keirin
Bronze	Final standings	Netherlands	Women's team sprint

== 2009–10 ==
Medal	Round	Name	Discipline
Silver	Round 1, Manchester	Yvonne Hijgenaar; Willy Kanis	Women's team sprint
Bronze	Round 1, Manchester	Willy Kanis	Women's 500 m time trial
Bronze	Round 1, Manchester	Vera Koedooder	Women's individual pursuit
Silver	Round 2, Melbourne	Yvonne Hijgenaar; Willy Kanis	Women's team sprint
Bronze	Round 2, Melbourne	Teun Mulder	Men's 1 km time trial
Bronze	Round 2, Melbourne	Willy Kanis	Women's sprint
Gold	Round 3, Cali	Yvonne Hijgenaar; Willy Kanis	Women's team sprint
Silver	Round 3, Cali	Teun Mulder	Men's keirin
Silver	Round 3, Cali	Willy Kanis	Women's 500 m time trial
Silver	Round 3, Cali	Willy Kanis	Women's sprint
Gold	Round 4, Beijing	Willy Kanis	Women's 500 m time trial
Gold	Round 4, Beijing	Vera Koedooder	Women's scratch
Silver	Round 4, Beijing	Levi Heimans; Arno van der Zwet; Tim Veldt; Sipke Zijlstra	Men's team pursuit
Silver	Round 4, Beijing	Yvonne Hijgenaar; Willy Kanis	Women's team sprint
Gold	Final standings	Netherlands	Women's team sprint
Silver	Final standings	Willy Kanis	Women's 500 m time trial
Bronze	Final standings	Willy Kanis	Women's sprint
Bronze	Final standings	Vera Koedooder	Women's scratch

== 2010–11 ==
Medal	Round	Name	Discipline
Bronze	Round 1, Melbourne	Teun Mulder	Men's sprint
Bronze	Round 1, Melbourne	Nick Stopler; Peter Schep	Men's madison
Silver	Round 3, Beijing	Willy Kanis; Yvonne Hijgenaar	Women's team sprint
Silver	Round 3, Beijing	Hugo Haak	Men's 1 km time trial
Silver	Round 3, Beijing	Kirsten Wild	Women's omnium
Silver	Round 4, Manchester	Kirsten Wild	Women's omnium
Silver	Final standings	Hugo Haak	Men's 1 km time trial
Bronze	Final standings	Netherlands	Men's madison

== 2011–12 ==
Medal	Round	Name	Discipline
Gold	Round 1, Astana	Ellen van Dijk; Kirsten Wild; Amy Pieters	Women's team pursuit
Bronze	Round 1, Astana	Levi Heimans; Jenning Huizenga; Wim Stroetinga; Arno van der Zwet	Men's team pursuit

== 2012–13 ==
Medal	Round	Name	Discipline
Bronze	Round 2, Glasgow	Roy Eefting	Men's scratch
Gold	Round 3, Aguascalientes	Matthijs Büchli	Men's keirin
Gold	Final standings	Matthijs Büchli	Men's keirin
Bronze	Final standings	Roy Eefting	Men's scratch

== 2013–14 ==
Medal	Round	Name	Discipline
Silver	Round 1, Manchester	Tim Veldt	Men's omnium
Gold	Round 3, Guadalajara	Jenning Huizenga	Men's individual pursuit
Gold	Round 3, Guadalajara	Matthijs Büchli	Men's keirin
Gold	Round 3, Guadalajara	Hugo Haak	Men's sprint
Gold	Round 3, Guadalajara	Nils van 't Hoenderdaal; Hugo Haak; Matthijs Büchli	Men's team sprint
Bronze	Round 3, Guadalajara	Hugo Haak	Men's 1 km time trial

== See also ==
- Netherlands at the UCI Track Cycling World Championships
- Netherlands at the European Track Championships
