= 2011 Dutch National Track Championships – Women's scratch =

Women's scratch
2011 Dutch National Track Championships

Race details
- Dates: 30 December 2011
- Stages: 1
- Distance: 10 km (6.214 mi)

Medalists
	Gold	Kirsten Wild
	Silver	Nathalie van Gogh
	Bronze	Roxane Knetemann

2011 Dutch National Track Championships
Sprint	men	women
Time trial	men	women
Individual pursuit	men	women
Keirin	men	women
Scratch	men	women
Points race	men	women
Madison	men	women

The women's scratch at the 2011 Dutch National Track Championships in Apeldoorn took place at Omnisport Apeldoorn on December 30, 2011. 18 athletes participated in the contest, of whom 14 finished.

== Competition format ==
Because of the number of entries, there were no qualification rounds for this discipline. Consequently, the event was run direct to the final. The competition consisted on 40 laps, making a total of 10 km.

== Race ==
With a few laps to go Ellen van Dijk raced clear of the bunch. Within the last lap Van Dijk was pulled back by Nathalie van Gogh and so the race ended in a bunch sprint. Kirsten Wild won the sprint, ahead of Nathalie van Gogh and Roxane Knetemann.

== Results ==
The race started at 18:45.

Rank	Name	Result
1st place, gold medalist(s)	Kirsten Wild	
2nd place, silver medalist(s)	Nathalie van Gogh	
3rd place, bronze medalist(s)	Roxane Knetemann	
4	Amy Pieters	
5	Kelly Markus	
6	Ellen van Dijk	
7	Laura van der Kamp	
8	Vera Koedooder	
9	Nathaly van Wesdonk	
10	Rozanne Slik	
11	Birgitta Roos	
12	Nina Kessler	
13	Winanda Spoor	
14	Aafke Eshuis	
15	Judith Bloem	DNF
15	Samantha van Steenis	DNF
15	Martine van de Herberg	DNF
15	Anneloes Stoelwinder	DNF

DNF = Did not finish.
Results from uci.ch.
