= 2011 Dutch National Track Championships – Women's keirin =

Women's keirin
2011 Dutch National Track Championships

Race details
- Dates: 29 December 2011
- Stages: 1

Medalists
	Gold	Willy Kanis
	Silver	Yvonne Hijgenaar
	Bronze	Shanne Braspennincx

2011 Dutch National Track Championships
Sprint	men	women
Time trial	men	women
Individual pursuit	men	women
Keirin	men	women
Scratch	men	women
Points race	men	women
Madison	men	women

The women's keirin at the 2011 Dutch National Track Championships in Apeldoorn took place at Omnisport Apeldoorn on December 29, 2011. 13 athletes participated in the contest.

Willy Kanis won the gold medal, Yvonne Hijgenaar took silver and Shanne Braspennincx won the bronze.

== Competition format ==
The Keirin races involved 5.5 laps of the track behind a motorcycle, followed by a 2.5 lap sprint to the finish. The tournament consisted of a semi-finals round, repechages and the finals. The top two cyclists in each semi-final advanced to the final, with the rest of the cyclists competing again in the repechage. Two of those cyclists advanced from the two repechage to the final as well, for a total of 6 finalists. The other riders competed in the 7th to 13th place classification race.

== Results ==
=== Semi-finals ===
Semi-final 1

Rank	Name	Note
1	Yvonne Hijgenaar	Q
2	Shanne Braspennincx	Q
3	Birgitta Roos	
4	Nathaly van Wesdonk	
5	Yesna Rijkhoff	
6	Nina Kessler	
7	Nathalie van Gogh	

Semi-final 2

Rank	Name	Note
1	Anneloes Stoelwinder	Q
2	Willy Kanis	Q
3	Kirsten Wild	
4	Marie-Louise Konkelaar	
5	Winanda Spoor	
6	Aafke Eshuis	

=== Repaches ===
Heat 1

Rank	Name	Note
1	Nina Kessler	Q
2	Winanda Spoor	
3	Aafke Eshuis	
4	Nathalie van Gogh	
	Birgitta Roos	DQ

Heat 2

Rank	Name	Note
1	Kirsten Wild	Q
2	Yesna Rijkhoff	
3	Nathaly van Wesdonk	
4	Marie-Louise Konkelaar	

=== Finals ===
7th - 13th

Rank	Name
7	Aafke Eshuis
8	Nathalie van Gogh
9	Winanda Spoor
10	Yesna Rijkhoff
11	Birgitta Roos
12	Nathaly van Wesdonk
13	Marie-Louise Konkelaar

Gold medal match

Rank	Name
1st place, gold medalist(s)	Willy Kanis
2nd place, silver medalist(s)	Yvonne Hijgenaar
3rd place, bronze medalist(s)	Shanne Braspennincx
4	Kirsten Wild
5	Nina Kessler
6	Anneloes Stoelwinder

=== Final results ===
Rank	Name
1st place, gold medalist(s)	Willy Kanis
2nd place, silver medalist(s)	Yvonne Hijgenaar
3rd place, bronze medalist(s)	Shanne Braspennincx
4	Kirsten Wild
5	Nina Kessler
6	Anneloes Stoelwinder
7	Aafke Eshuis
8	Nathalie van Gogh
9	Winanda Spoor
10	Yesna Rijkhoff
11	Birgitta Roos
12	Nathaly van Wesdonk
13	Marie-Louise Konkelaar

Results from uci.ch and nkbaanwielrennen.nl.
