= 2011 Dutch National Track Championships – Women's madison =

Women's madison
2011 Dutch National Track Championships

Race details
- Dates: 30 December 2011
- Stages: 1
- Distance: 25 km (15.53 mi)

Medalists
| | Gold | Ellen van Dijk; Kirsten Wild |
| | Silver | Kelly Markus; Amy Pieters |
| | Bronze | Vera Koedooder; Winanda Spoor |

2011 Dutch National Track Championships
| Sprint | men | women |
| Time trial | men | women |
| Individual pursuit | men | women |
| Keirin | men | women |
| Scratch | men | women |
| Points race | men | women |
| Madison | men | women |

The women's madison at the 2011 Dutch National Track Championships in Apeldoorn took place at Omnisport Apeldoorn on December 30, 2011. 7 teams participated in the contest. Ellen van Dijk and Kirsten Wild won the gold medal, Kelly Markus and Amy Pieters took silver and Vera Koedooder and Winanda Spoor won the bronze.

== Competition format ==
Because of the number of teams, there were no qualification rounds for this discipline. Consequently, the event was run direct to the final. The competition consisted on 100 laps, making a total of 25 km.

== Race ==
The competition started at 20:40. Ellen van Dijk and Kirsten Wild, the favourites of the race, won all the intermediate sprints. After a few round of the madison Amy Pieters attacked, but was pulled back by Van Dijk. The medalists teams lapped the other teams with at least 2 laps. Near the end of the race Van Dijk and Wild raced clear of the others.

== Results ==
| Rank | Name | Points | Laps down |
|---|---|---|---|
| 1st place, gold medalist(s) | Ellen van Dijk; Kirsten Wild | 20 | |
| 2nd place, silver medalist(s) | Kelly Markus; Amy Pieters | 10 | |
| 3rd place, bronze medalist(s) | Vera Koedooder; Winanda Spoor | 9 | |
| 4 | Aafke Eshuis; Nathalie van Gogh | 5 | -2 |
| 5 | Nina Kessler; Laura van der Kamp | 0 | -2 |
| 6 | Daisy Rodenburg; Nicky Zijlaard | 0 | -2 |
| 7 | Martine van der Herberg; Samantha van Steenis | 0 | DNF |

DNF = did not finish.
Results from nkbaanwielrennen.nl.
