= 2011 Dutch National Track Championships – Men's sprint =

Men's sprint
2011 Dutch National Track Championships

Race details
- Dates: 30 December 2011
- Stages: 1

Medalists
	Gold	Teun Mulder
	Silver	Hugo Haak
	Bronze	Roy van den Berg

2011 Dutch National Track Championships
Sprint	men	women
Time trial	men	women
Individual pursuit	men	women
Keirin	men	women
Scratch	men	women
Points race	men	women
Madison	men	women

The Men's cycling sprint at the 2011 Dutch National Track Championships in Apeldoorn took place at Omnisport Apeldoorn on December 30, 2011. 21 athletes participated in the contest.

Teun Mulder won the gold medal, Hugo Haak took silver and Roy van den Berg won the bronze.

== Competition format ==
The tournament consisted of an initial 200 m time trial with a flying start. The top 12 athletes advanced to the first round. The first round comprised head-to-head races based on seeding. The winners of those four heats advanced to the quarter-finals, the losers to the repaches. The event was further a single-elimination tournament. Each race pitted two cyclists against each other in the best-of-three races. Each race was three laps of the track with side-by-side starts.

== Results ==
=== Qualification round ===
A 200 m time trial with a flying start. The top 12 athletes advanced to the first round.

Rank	Name	Time	Note
1	Hugo Haak	10.451	Q
2	Roy van den Berg	10.492	Q
3	Teun Mulder	10.498	Q
4	Hylke van Grieken	10.744	Q
5	Matthijs Büchli	10.860	Q
6	Rigard van Klooster	10.980	Q
7	Nils van 't Hoenderdaal	11.136	Q
8	Patrick Bos	11.139	Q
9	Jeffrey Hoogland	11.380	Q
10	Dennis Looij	11.420	Q
11	Jeroen Hoekstra	11.477	Q
12	Hidde de Vries	11.748	Q
13	Niels van Otterloo	11.763	
14	Rochéz Harbers	11.767	
15	Martijn Scherpen	11.867	
16	Martijn van den Belt	11.886	
17	Nick Post	11.933	
18	Dempster Winterberger	11.984	
19	Rene Smalbrugge	12.148	
20	Michael Veen	12.196	
21	Philip Kootstra	12.378	

=== Round 1 ===
The winner of each heat advanced to the quarter-finals, the other riders to the repaches.

Heat 1

Name	Race 1	Note
Hugo Haak	1	Q
Hidde de Vries	2	

Heat 2

Name	Race 1	Note
Roy van den Berg	1	Q
Jeroen Hoekstra	2	

Heat 3

Name	Race 1	Note
Teun Mulder	1	Q
Dennis Looij	2	

Heat 4

Name	Race 1	Note
Hylke van Grieken	1	Q
Jeffrey Hoogland	2	

Heat 5

Name	Race 1	Note
Matthijs Büchli	1	Q
Patrick Bos	2	

Heat 4

Name	Race 1	Note
Rigard van Klooster	1	Q
Nils van 't Hoenderdaal	2	

=== Repaches ===
The winner of each heat advanced to the quarter-finals.

Heat 1

Name	Race 1	Note
Hidde de Vries	3	
Jeffrey Hoogland	1	Q
Nils van 't Hoenderdaal	2	

Heat 2

Name	Race 1	Note
Jeroen Hoekstra	2	
Dennis Looij	3	
Patrick Bos	1	Q

=== Quarter-finals ===
The winner of each quarter-final (best of 3) advanced to the semi-finals. The other riders went to the 5th – 8th place classification sprint.

Quarter-final 1

Name	Race 1	Race 2	Note
Hugo Haak	1	1	Q
Patrick Bos	2	2	

Quarter-final 2

Name	Race 1	Race 2	Note
Roy van den Berg	1	1	Q
Jeffrey Hoogland	2	2	

Quarter-final 3

Name	Race 1	Race 2	Note
Teun Mulder	1	1	Q
Rigard van Klooster	2	2	

Quarter-final 4

Name	Race 1	Race 2	Note
Hylke van Grieken	2	2	
Matthijs Büchli	1	1	Q

=== Classification sprints ===
9th – 12th place

Name	Race 1	Rank
Jeroen Hoekstra	1	9
Hidde De Vries	2	10
Nils van 't Hoenderdaal	3	11
Dennis Looij	4	12

5th – 8th place

Name	Race 1	Rank
Hylke van Grieken	1	5
Patrick Bos	2	6
Rigard van Klooster	3	7
Jeffrey Hoogland	4	8

=== Semi-finals ===
The winner of each semi-final (best of 3) advanced to the gold medal race. The other two riders went to the bronze medal race.

Semi-final 1

Name	Race 1	Race 2	Note
Hugo Haak	1	1	Q
Matthijs Büchli	2	2	

Semi-final 2

Name	Race 1	Race 2	Note
Roy van den Berg	2	2	
Teun Mulder	1	1	Q

=== Finals ===
Bronze medal match

Name	Race 1	Race 2	Race 3	Rank
Matthijs Büchli	1	2	2	4
Roy van den Berg	2	1	1	3rd place, bronze medalist(s)

Gold medal match

Name	Race 1	Race 2	Race 3	Rank
Hugo Haak	2	1	2	2nd place, silver medalist(s)
Teun Mulder	1	2	1	1st place, gold medalist(s)

== Final results ==
Rank	Name
1st place, gold medalist(s)	Teun Mulder
2nd place, silver medalist(s)	Hugo Haak
3rd place, bronze medalist(s)	Roy van den Berg
4	Matthijs Büchli
5	Hylke van Grieken
6	Patrick Bos
7	Rigard van Klooster
8	Jeffrey Hoogland
9	Jeroen Hoekstra
10	Hidde de Vries
11	Nils van ‘t Hoenderdaal
12	Dennis Looij
13	Niels van Otterloo
14	Rochéz Harbers
15	Martijn Scherpen
16	Martijn van den Belt
17	Nick Post
18	Dempster Winterberger
19	Rene Smalbrugge
20	Michael Veen
21	Philip Kootstra

Results from nkbaanwielrennen.nl.
