= 2011 Dutch National Track Championships – Women's sprint =

Women's sprint
2011 Dutch National Track Championships

Race details
- Dates: 28 December 2011
- Stages: 1

Medalists
	Gold	Yvonne Hijgenaar
	Silver	Willy Kanis
	Bronze	Shanne Braspennincx

2011 Dutch National Track Championships
Sprint	men	women
Time trial	men	women
Individual pursuit	men	women
Keirin	men	women
Scratch	men	women
Points race	men	women
Madison	men	women

The women's cycling sprint at the 2011 Dutch National Track Championships in Apeldoorn took place at Omnisport Apeldoorn on December 28, 2011. 5 athletes participated in the contest.

Yvonne Hijgenaar won the gold medal, Willy Kanis took silver and Shanne Braspennincx won the bronze.

== Competition format ==
The sprint event was a single-elimination tournament after seeding via time trial. Each match pits two cyclists against each other in the best-of-three races. Each race consisted of three laps of the track with side-by-side starts.

== Results ==
=== Qualification ===
A 200 m time trial with a flying start. The top 4 athletes advanced to the semi-finals.

Rank	Name	Time	Note
1	Yvonne Hijgenaar	11.422	Q
2	Willy Kanis	11.547	Q
3	Shanne Braspennincx	12.409	Q
4	Yesna Rijkhoff	13.052	Q
5	Marie-Louise Konkelaar	13.876	

=== Semi-finals ===
The winners advanced to the finals, the other two competed for the bronze medal and fourth place.

Match 1

Name	Race 1	Race 2
Yvonne Hijgenaar	1	1
Yesna Rijkhoff	2	2

Match 2

Name	Race 1	Race 2
Willy Kanis	1	1
Shanne Braspennincx	2	2

=== Finals ===
Bronze medal match

Name	Race 1	Race 2	Rank
Yesna Rijkhoff	2	2	4
Shanne Braspennincx	1	1	3rd place, bronze medalist(s)

Gold medal match

Name	Race 1	Race 2	Rank
Yvonne Hijgenaar	1	1	1st place, gold medalist(s)
Willy Kanis	2	2	2nd place, silver medalist(s)

== Final results ==
Rank	Name
1st place, gold medalist(s)	Yvonne Hijgenaar
2nd place, silver medalist(s)	Willy Kanis
3rd place, bronze medalist(s)	Shanne Braspennincx
4	Yesna Rijkhoff
5	Marie-Louise Konkelaar

Results from uci.ch and nkbaanwielrennen.nl.
