= 2011 Dutch National Track Championships – Women's individual pursuit =

Women's individual pursuit
2011 Dutch National Track Championships

Race details
- Dates: 28 December 2011
- Stages: 1
- Distance: 3 km (1.864 mi)
- Winning time: 3:41.353

Medalists
	Gold	Ellen van Dijk
	Silver	Kirsten Wild
	Bronze	Amy Pieters

2011 Dutch National Track Championships
Sprint	men	women
Time trial	men	women
Individual pursuit	men	women
Keirin	men	women
Scratch	men	women
Points race	men	women
Madison	men	women

The women's individual pursuit at the 2011 Dutch National Track Championships in Apeldoorn took place at Omnisport Apeldoorn on December 28, 2011. 14 athletes participated in the contest.

Ellen van Dijk won the gold medal, Kirsten Wild took silver and Amy Pieters won the bronze.

== Preview ==
Ellen van Dijk, the national champion of 2007, 2008 and 2010 was top favourite for this discipline.

== Competition format ==
The tournament started with a qualifying round. The two fastest qualifiers advanced to the gold medal final. The numbers three and four competed against each other for the bronze medal.

== Race ==
Ellen van Dijk was as well in the qualification round as in the final the fastes and became, after being ascent in 2009, for the 4th time in 5 years national champion in the individual pursuit. Kirsten Wild took the silver medal and Amy Pieters won the bronze.

== Results ==
=== Qualification ===
The qualification round started at 17:30.

Rank	Name	Time	Note
1	Ellen van Dijk	3:43.457	Q
2	Kirsten Wild	3.44.971	Q
3	Amy Pieters	3.47.407	q
4	Laura van der Kamp	3.47.540	q
5	Vera Koedooder	3.50.328	
6	Iris Slappendel	3.50.989	
7	Nathalie van Gogh	3.54.252	
8	Winanda Spoor	3.54.817	
9	Rozanne Slik	3.59.474	
10	Birgitta Roos	4.01.899	
11	Martine van der Herberg	4.02.334	
12	Aafke Eshuis	4.02.594	
13	Astrid Schuitema	4.03.331	
14	Judith Bloem	4.04.225	

=== Finals ===
The finals started at 19:40.

Bronze medal match

Name	Time	Rank
Amy Pieters	3.45.293	3rd place, bronze medalist(s)
Laura van der Kamp	3.49.998	4

Gold medal match

Name	Time	Rank
Ellen van Dijk	3.41.353	1st place, gold medalist(s)
Kirsten Wild	3.42.203	2nd place, silver medalist(s)

=== Final results ===
Rank	Name	Time
1st place, gold medalist(s)	Ellen van Dijk	3.41.353
2nd place, silver medalist(s)	Kirsten Wild	3.42.203
3rd place, bronze medalist(s)	Amy Pieters	3.45.293
4	Laura van der Kamp	3.49.998
5	Vera Koedooder	3.50.328
6	Iris Slappendel	3.50.989
7	Nathalie van Gogh	3.54.252
8	Winanda Spoor	3.54.817
9	Rozanne Slik	3.59.474
10	Birgitta Roos	4.01.899
11	Martine van der Herberg	4.02.334
12	Aafke Eshuis	4.02.594
13	Astrid Schuitema	4.03.331
14	Judith Bloem	4.04.225

Results from nkbaanwielrennen.nl.
