= 2011 Dutch National Track Championships – Men's keirin =

Men's keirin
2011 Dutch National Track Championships

Race details
- Dates: 27 December 2011
- Stages: 1

Medalists
	Gold	Roy van den Berg
	Silver	Hugo Haak
	Bronze	Matthijs Büchli

2011 Dutch National Track Championships
Sprint	men	women
Time trial	men	women
Individual pursuit	men	women
Keirin	men	women
Scratch	men	women
Points race	men	women
Madison	men	women

The Men's keirin at the 2011 Dutch National Track Championships in Apeldoorn took place at Omnisport Apeldoorn on December 27, 2011. 19 athletes participated in the contest.

Roy van den Berg won the gold medal, Hugo Haak took silver and Matthijs Büchli won the bronze.

== Competition format ==
The Keirin races involve 6.5 laps of the track behind a pace-setter, followed by a 2.5 lap sprint to the finish. The tournament consisted of preliminary heats and repechages, a semi-finals round, and the finals. The heats and repechages narrowed the field to 12. The semi-finals divided the remaining 12 into 6 finalists. The final round also included a ranking race for 7th to 12th place.

== Results ==
=== Qualification ===
The top 2 athletes of each heat advanced to the semi-finals and the others to the repaches.

Heat 1

Rank	Name	Note
1	Roy van den Berg	Q
2	Hylke van Grieken	Q
3	Dempster Winterberger	
4	Martijn van den Belt	
5	Dennis Looij	

Heat 2

Rank	Name	Note
1	Matthijs Büchli	Q
2	Patrick Bos	Q
3	Niels van Otterloo	
4	Jeroen Hoekstra	

Heat 3

Rank	Name	Note
1	Hugo Haak	Q
2	Nils van `t Hoenderdaal	Q
3	Philip Kootstra	
4	Yorick Bos	
	Nick Post	DNF

Heat 4

Rank	Name	Note
1	Rigard van Klooster	Q
2	Jeffrey Hoogland	Q
3	Rene Smalbrugge	
4	Michael Veen	

=== Repaches ===
The top 2 athletes of each heat advanced to the semi-finals.

Heat 1

Rank	Name	Note
1	Yorick Bos	Q
2	Niels van Otterloo	Q
3	Dempster Winterberger	
4	Jeroen Hoekstra	
5	Nick Post	

Heat 2

Rank	Name	Note
1	Dennis Looij	Q
2	Rene Smalbrugge	Q
3	Michael Veen	
4	Hidde de Vries	
5	Martijn van den Belt	
6	Philip Kootstra	

=== Semi-finals ===
The top 3 athletes of each semi-final advanced to the gold medal match and the others to 7th – 12 classification match.

Semi-final 1

Rank	Name	Note
1	Roy van den Berg	Q
2	Hylke van Grieken	Q
3	Yorick Bos	Q
4	Rigard van Klooster	
5	Niels van Otterloo	
6	Jeffrey Hoogland	

Semi-final 2

Rank	Name	Note
1	Hugo Haak	Q
2	Matthijs Büchli	Q
3	Nils van `t Hoenderdaal	Q
4	Patrick Bos	
5	Rene Smalbrugge	
6	Dennis Looij	

=== Finals ===
7th – 12th

Rank	Name
1	Rigard van Klooster
2	Dennis Looij
3	Patrick Bos
4	Rene Smalbrugge
5	Jeffrey Hoogland
6	Niels van Otterloo

Gold medal match

Rank	Name
1st place, gold medalist(s)	Roy van den Berg
2nd place, silver medalist(s)	Hugo Haak
3rd place, bronze medalist(s)	Matthijs Büchli
4	Yorick Bos
5	Hylke van Grieken
6	Nils van `t Hoenderdaal

== Final results ==
Rank	Name
1st place, gold medalist(s)	Roy van den Berg
2nd place, silver medalist(s)	Hugo Haak
3rd place, bronze medalist(s)	Matthijs Büchli
4	Yorick Bos
5	Hylke van Grieken
6	Nils van `t Hoenderdaal
7	Rigard van Klooster
8	Dennis Looij
9	Patrick Bos
10	Rene Smalbrugge
11	Jeffrey Hoogland
12	Niels van Otterloo

Results from nkbaanwielrennen.nl
