= Rigard van Klooster =

Dutch track racing cyclist and speed skater

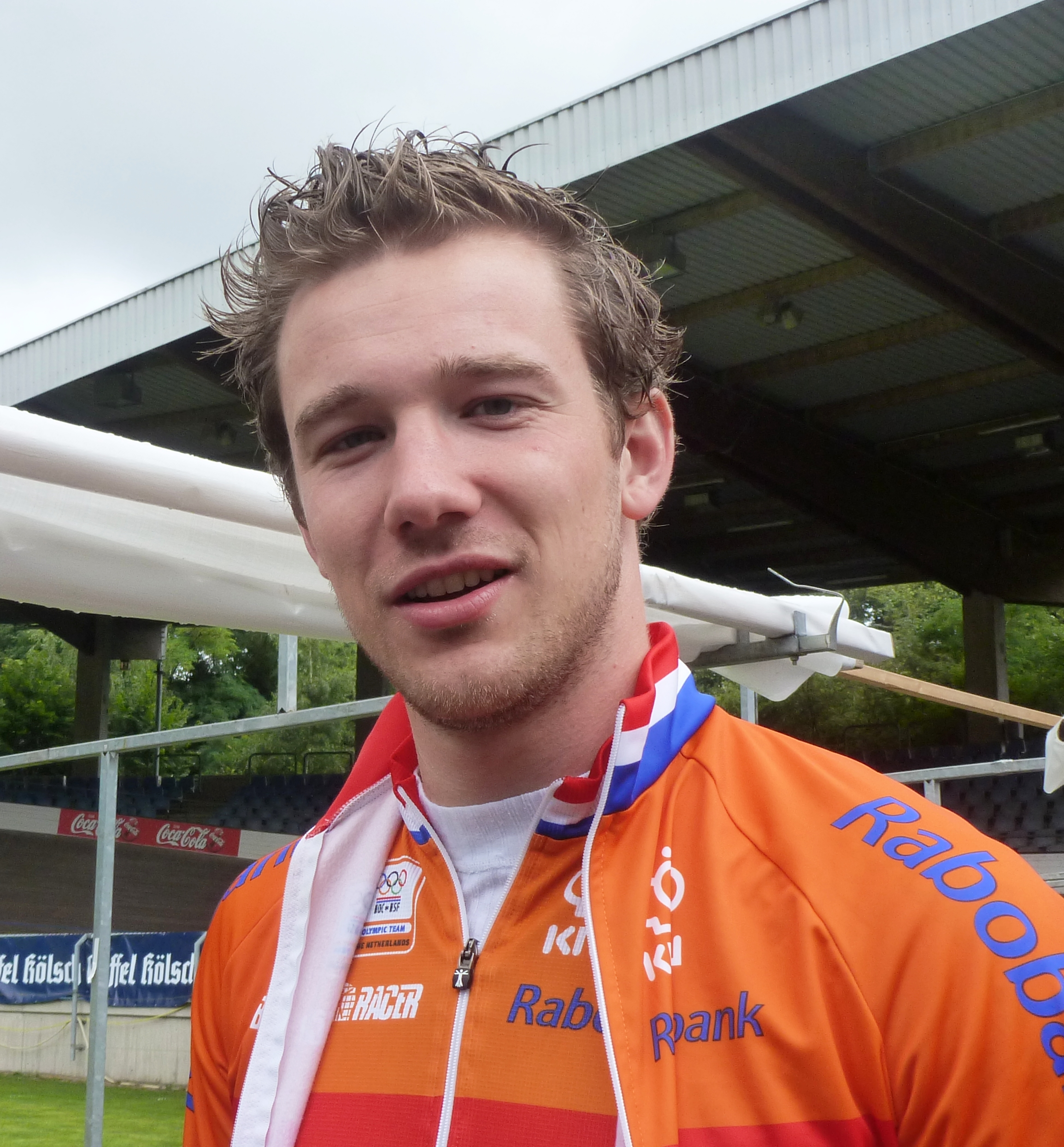

Personal information
- Full name: Rigardus Antonius "Rigard" van Klooster
- Born: April 6, 1989 (age 37) Linschoten, the Netherlands

Cycling career
- Sport: Cycling
- Discipline: Track
- Role: Rider
- Rider type: Sprint

Rigardus Antonius "Rigard" van Klooster (born April 6, 1989 in Linschoten) is a former Dutch track racing cyclist and speed skater.

== Sport career ==
=== Speed skating ===
Rigard van Klooster started his sports career with speed skating. He started with speed skating when he was very young, started competing in 2002, and won his first national junior championship in 2006 as a B-junior. Since the season 2007–2008, Van Klooster skated for Gewest Noord-Holland/Utrecht and was a trainee at the APPM-team since the 2008–2009 season. As an elite athlete, Van Klooster competed in 2010 and 2011 at both the Dutch Allround Championships and the Dutch Single Distance Championships. He finished 17th overall at the 2010 KNSB Dutch Allround Championships and 22nd overall at the 2011 KNSB Dutch Allround Championships.

=== Track cycling ===
2011

A wingate test in early 2011 showed that van Klooster had the potential for track cycling. After some track cycling sessions, the KNWU offered van Klooster a place in the development team and a room in Papendal, near the velodrome in Apeldoorn. Van Klooster took the offer and quit speed skating. He rode in his first international competition at the Trois Jours d'Aigle, where he finished 13th. Two weeks after riding the two days of Wien, Van Klooster became the Dutch national sprint champion for amateurs in December. Later that month, after getting an elite license, he placed 4th in the 1 km time trial at the Dutch national track championships and 7th in both the keirin and the sprint.

2012

Van Klooster competed in the International Track Grand Prix of Alkmaar, Perth, Colorado Springs, Cottbus and Vienna. In Vienna, he won bronze in the team sprint. Based on his results, he qualified for the 2012 European Track Championships where he finished 6th in the team sprint (together with Hylke van Grieken and Matthijs Büchli) and 12th in the keirin. At the UCI Track Cycling World Cup Classic in Glasgow he competed in the keirin. He finished twice in third place and did not reach the second round.

== Results in major competitions ==
=== Speed skating ===
- 2010
  - 24th Dutch Single Distance Championships, 1500 meter
  - 17th Dutch Allround Championships, 500m: 15th, 1500m: 15th, 5000m: 15th
  - 6th Dutch Junior Single Distance Championships, 10.000m (neo-senior)
- 2011
  - 17th Dutch Single Distance Championships, 500 meter
  - 22nd Dutch Allround Championships, 500m: 6th, 1500m: 21st, 5000m: 24th

Junior period

(gold) European Junior Games
(silver) Vikingrace
(silver) Interland (Ned-Ger-Nor-Swe-Fin)
(bronze) Dutch Junior Championships

=== Track cycling ===
- 2011–2012
  - Dutch National Amateur Sprint Champion
  - 4th 2011 Dutch National Track Championships, 1 km time trial
  - 7th 2011 Dutch National Track Championships, keirin
  - 7th 2011 Dutch National Track Championships, sprint
- 2012–2013
  - (bronze) Grand Prix Vienna, team sprint
  - 6th 2012 European Track Championships, team sprint
  - 12th 2012 European Track Championships, keirin
  - 19th UCI Track Cycling World Cup Classic – Glasgow, keirin
  - 6th 2012 Dutch National Track Championships, keirin

== Personal records ==
Speed skating

Distance	Time	Date	Ice Rink
500 meter	36.51	19 March 2011	Olympic Oval, Calgary
1000 meter	1:11.28	19 March 2011	Olympic Oval, Calgary
1500 meter	1:48.72	16 March 2011	Olympic Oval, Calgary
3000 meter	3:56.56	15 March 2011	Olympic Oval, Calgary
5000 meter	6:47.47	15 October 2009	Thialf, Heerenveen
5000 meter	14:30.72	21 March 2010	De Westfries, Hoorn

Track cycling

Discipline	Time	Date	Track	Competition	Ref
Sprint (200m)	10.297	25 June 2012	Colorado Springs Velodrome, Colorado Springs	US Grand Prix of Sprinting	
Time trial (1000m)	1:05.114	13 May 2012	Oderland-Halle, Frankfurt		
