= 2010 Dutch National Track Championships – Women's 500 m time trial =

Women's 500 m time trial
2010 Dutch National Track Championships

Race details
- Dates: 28 December 2010
- Stages: 1
- Distance: 0.5 km (0.3107 mi)
- Winning time: 34.685

Medalists
	Gold	Willy Kanis
	Silver	Yvonne Hijgenaar
	Bronze	Laura van der Kamp

The women's 500 m time trial at the 2010 Dutch National Track Championships in Apeldoorn took place at Omnisport Apeldoorn on December 28, 2010. 14 athletes participated in the contest.

Willy Kanis won the gold medal, Yvonne Hijgenaar took silver and Laura van der Kamp won the bronze.

== Competition format ==
There was no qualification round for this discipline. Consequently, the event was run direct to the final.

== Results ==
Rank	Name	Time
1st place, gold medalist(s)	Willy Kanis	34.685
2nd place, silver medalist(s)	Yvonne Hijgenaar	35.755
3rd place, bronze medalist(s)	Laura van der Kamp	36.848
4	Lieke Klaus	37.699
5	Kirsten Wild	37.932
6	Marie-Louise Konkelaar	37.975
7	Birgitta Roos	38.080
8	Yesna Rijkhoff	38.921
9	Nathaly van Wesdonk	39.362
10	Iris Slappendel	39.406
11	Aafke Eshuis	39.667
12	Margo Klomp	42.047
13	Ilona den Hartog	42.157
14	Mathilde Matthijsse	42.989

Results from wielerpunt.com.
