= 2011 Dutch National Track Championships – Men's 1 km time trial =

Men's 1 km time trial
2011 Dutch National Track Championships

Race details
- Dates: 30 December 2011
- Stages: 1
- Distance: 1 km (0.6214 mi)
- Winning time: 1:02.479

Medalists
	Gold	Teun Mulder
	Silver	Matthijs Büchli
	Bronze	Yondi Schmidt

2011 Dutch National Track Championships
Sprint	men	women
Time trial	men	women
Individual pursuit	men	women
Keirin	men	women
Scratch	men	women
Points race	men	women
Madison	men	women

The men's 500 m time trial at the 2011 Dutch National Track Championships in Apeldoorn took place at Omnisport Apeldoorn on December 29, 2011. 19 athletes participated in the contest.

Teun Mulder won the gold medal, Matthijs Büchli took silver and Yondi Schmidt won the bronze.

== Results ==
Rank	Name	Time
1st place, gold medalist(s)	Teun Mulder	1:02.479
2nd place, silver medalist(s)	Matthijs Büchli	1:04.852
3rd place, bronze medalist(s)	Yondi Schmidt	1:04.878
4	Rigard van Klooster	1:05.900
5	Roy Eefting	1:06.664
6	Arno van der Zwet	1:07.149
7	Steven Lammertink	1:07.197
8	Jeffrey Hoogland	1:07.339
9	Dennis Looij	1:09.267
10	Rochez Harbers	1:09.712
11	Nick Post	1:09.877
12	Hidde de Vries	1:09.922
13	Martijn van den Belt	1:10.091
14	Christian Kos	1:10.189
15	Thomas Van Ee	1:10.767
16	Rene Smalbrugge	1:11.291
17	Carlo Kop	1:11.301
18	Dempster Winterberger	1:11.592
19	Philip Kootstra	1:13.199

Results from uci.ch.
