= 2012 Dutch National Track Championships – Men's keirin =

Men's keirin
2012 Dutch National Track Championships

Race details
- Dates: 27 December 2012
- Stages: 1

Medalists
	Gold	Hugo Haak
	Silver	Nils van `t Hoenderdaal
	Bronze	Matthijs Büchli

The Men's keirin at the 2012 Dutch National Track Championships in Apeldoorn took place at Omnisport Apeldoorn on December 27, 2011. 12 athletes participated in the contest.

Hugo Haak won the gold medal, Nils van `t Hoenderdaal took silver and Matthijs Büchli won the bronze.

== Competition format ==
The Keirin races involve 6.5 laps of the track behind a pace-setter, followed by a 2.5 lap sprint to the finish. The tournament consisted of preliminary heats and finals. The heats divided the riders into six finalists. The final round also included a ranking race for 7th to 12th place.

== Results ==
=== Qualification ===
The top 2 athletes of each heat advanced to the gold medal race.

Heat 1

Rank	Name	Note
1	Hugo Haak	Q
2	Patrick Bos	Q
3	Hylke van Grieken	
4	Hidde de Vries	

Heat 2

Rank	Name	Note
1	Matthijs Büchli	Q
2	Nils van `t Hoenderdaal	Q
3	Jeffrey Hoogland	
4	Michael Veen	

Heat 3

Rank	Name	Note
1	Rigard van Klooster	Q
2	Bart Hommes	Q
3	Yorick Bos	
4	Niels van Otterloo	

=== Finals ===
Ranking race for 7th to 12th place

Rank	Name
1	Jeffrey Hoogland
2	Hylke van Grieken
3	Yorick Bos
4	Niels van Otterloo
5	Michael Veen
6	Hidde de Vries

Gold medal match

Rank	Name
1st place, gold medalist(s)	Hugo Haak
2nd place, silver medalist(s)	Nils van `t Hoenderdaal
3rd place, bronze medalist(s)	Matthijs Büchli
4	Patrick Bos
5	Bart Hommes
6	Rigard van Klooster

== Final results ==
Rank	Name
1st place, gold medalist(s)	Hugo Haak
2nd place, silver medalist(s)	Nils van `t Hoenderdaal
3rd place, bronze medalist(s)	Matthijs Büchli
4	Patrick Bos
5	Bart Hommes
6	Rigard van Klooster
7	Jeffrey Hoogland
8	Hylke van Grieken
9	Yorick Bos
10	Niels van Otterloo
11	Michael Veen
12	Hidde de Vries

Results from nkbaanwielrennen.nl
