= Dutch National Track Championships – Women's madison =

The Dutch National Track Championships – Women's madison is the Dutch national championship madison event held annually at the Dutch National Track Championships. The event was first introduced for women in 2009.

== Medalists ==
| Championships | Gold | Silver | Bronze |
|---|---|---|---|
| 2009 Alkmaar | Kirsten Wild; Vera Koedooder | Roxane Knetemann; Amy Pieters | Winanda Spoor; Lotte Van Hoek |
| 2010 Apeldoorn | Roxane Knetemann; Amy Pieters | Ellen van Dijk; Vera Koedooder | Nina Kessler; Winanda Spoor |
| 2011 Apeldoorn | Ellen van Dijk; Kirsten Wild | Kelly Markus; Amy Pieters | Vera Koedooder; Winanda Spoor |
| 2012 Apeldoorn | Marianne Vos; Roxane Knetemann | Laura van der Kamp; Kirsten Wild | Amy Pieters; Kelly Markus |
| 2013 Apeldoorn | Kelly Markus; Amy Pieters | Winanda Spoor; Kirsten Wild | Vera Koedooder; Roxane Knetemann |
| 2014 Apeldoorn | Kelly Markus; Amy Pieters | Nina Kessler; Nicky Zijlaard | Sigrid Jochems; Winanda Spoor |
| 2015 Alkmaar | Kirsten Wild; Nina Kessler | Kelly Markus; Amy Pieters | Roxane Knetemann; Vera Koedooder |

Results from cyclebase.nl

== Multiple champions ==
3 times champion: Kirsten Wild and Amy Pieters, 2 times champion Roxane Knetemann, Kelly Markus
