= 2010 Dutch National Track Championships =

- Venue: Apeldoorn, Netherlands
- Dates: October 16 (madison); December 28–December 30
- Velodrome: Omnisport Apeldoorn

The 2010 Dutch National Track Championships were the Dutch national Championship for endurance and sprint disciplines for track cycling. The madison discipline took place at 16 October. The other competitions took place at Omnisport Apeldoorn in Apeldoorn, the Netherlands from December 28 to December 30, 2011. The event was organized by the KNWU, and competitions were held of various track cycling disciplines in different age, gender and disability categories.

== Medal summary ==
=== Elite ===
Event	Gold	Silver	Bronze
Men's Events
Men's sprint	Roy van den Berg	Hugo Haak	Hylke van Grieken
Men's 1 km time trial	Tim Veldt	Hugo Haak	Yondi Schmidt
Men's keirin	Roy van den Berg	Patrick Bos	Hylke van Grieken
Men's individual pursuit	Levi Heimans	Tim Veldt	Roy Pieters
Men's scratch	Peter Schep	Wim Stroetinga	Barry Markus
Men's points race	Raymond Kreder	Roy Pieters	Barry Markus
Men's madison	Theo Bos; Peter Schep	Yoeri Havik; Barry Markus	Nick Stopler; Dylan van Baarle
Women's Events
Women's sprint	Willy Kanis	Yvonne Hijgenaar	Lieke Klaus
Women's 500 m time trial	Willy Kanis	Yvonne Hijgenaar	Laura van der Kamp
Women's keirin	Willy Kanis	Yvonne Hijgenaar	Nina Kessler
Women's individual pursuit	Ellen van Dijk	Kirsten Wild	Vera Koedooder
Women's scratch	Winanda Spoor	Roxane Knetemann	Ellen van Dijk
Women's points race	Kirsten Wild	Amy Pieters	Ellen van Dijk
Women's madison	Roxane Knetemann; Amy Pieters	Ellen van Dijk; Vera Koedooder	Nina Kessler; Winanda Spoor

Results from wielerpunt.com and cyclebase.nl.
