= 2009 UCI Track Cycling World Championships – Women's keirin =

Rainbow jersey

The Women's Keirin is one of the 9 women's events at the 2009 UCI Track Cycling World Championships, held in Pruszków, Poland.

20 Cyclists from 16 countries participated in the contest, which was held on 29 March.

== First round ==
=== Heat 1 ===
Rank	Name	Country	Q
1	Guo Shuang	China	Q
2	Sandie Clair	France	Q
3	Kristina Vogel	Germany	R
4	Olga Streltsova	Russia	R
5	Victoria Pendleton	Great Britain	R
6	Renata Dąbrowska	Poland	R

=== Heat 2 ===
Rank	Name	Country	Q
1	Clara Sanchez	France	Q
2	Anna Meares	Australia	Q
3	Diana García	Colombia	R
4	Jessica Varnish	Great Britain	R
5	Elisa Frisoni	Italy	R
6	Yvonne Hijgenaar	Netherlands	R
7	Zheng Lulu	China	R

=== Heat 3 ===
Rank	Name	Country	Q
1	Simona Krupeckaitė	Lithuania	Q
2	Lisandra Guerra Rodriguez	Cuba	Q
3	Kaarle McCulloch	Australia	R
4	Willy Kanis	Netherlands	R
5	Miriam Welte	Germany	R
6	Maneephan Jutatip	Thailand	R
7	Monique Sullivan	Canada	R

== First Round Repechage ==
=== Heat 1 ===
Rank	Name	Country	Q
1	Kristina Vogel	Germany	Q
2	Miriam Welte	Germany	Q
3	Yvonne Hijgenaar	Netherlands	
4	Jessica Varnish	Great Britain	

=== Heat 2 ===
Rank	Name	Country	Q
1	Willy Kanis	Netherlands	Q
2	Elisa Frisoni	Italy	Q
3	Monique Sullivan	Canada	
4	Renata Dąbrowska	Poland	
5	Diana García	Colombia	

=== Heat 3 ===
Rank	Name	Country	Q
1	Victoria Pendleton	Great Britain	Q
2	Kaarle McCulloch	Australia	Q
3	Olga Streltsova	Russia	
4	Zheng Lulu	China	
5	Maneephan Jutatip	Thailand	

== Second round ==
=== Heat 1 ===
Rank	Name	Country	Q
1	Guo Shuang	China	Q
2	Anna Meares	Australia	Q
3	Elisa Frisoni	Italy	Q
4	Lisandra Guerra Rodriguez	Cuba	
5	Kaarle McCulloch	Australia	
6	Kristina Vogel	Germany	

=== Heat 2 ===
Rank	Name	Country	Q
1	Clara Sanchez	France	Q
2	Willy Kanis	Netherlands	Q
3	Sandie Clair	France	Q
4	Victoria Pendleton	Great Britain	
5	Miriam Welte	Germany	
6	Simona Krupeckaitė	Lithuania	

== Finals ==
=== Final 1-6 ===
Rank	Name	Country
	Guo Shuang	China
	Clara Sanchez	France
	Willy Kanis	Netherlands
4	Elisa Frisoni	Italy
5	Anna Meares	Australia
6	Sandie Clair	France

=== Final 7-12 ===
Rank	Name	Country
7	Lisandra Guerra Rodriguez	Cuba
8	Miriam Welte	Germany
9	Kaarle McCulloch	Australia
10	Kristina Vogel	Germany
11	Victoria Pendleton	Great Britain
DNS	Simona Krupeckaitė	Lithuania

=== Final Standings 13-20 ===
Rank	Name	Country
13	Yvonne Hijgenaar	Netherlands
13	Olga Streltsova	Russia
13	Monique Sullivan	Canada
16	Zheng Lulu	China
16	Jessica Varnish	Great Britain
16	Renata Dąbrowska	Poland
19	Diana García	Colombia
19	Maneephan Jutatip	Thailand
