= Perth International Track Cycling Grand Prix =

Race details
- Region: Australia
- Type: Track cycling

History
- First edition: 2000
- Editions: 14
- Final edition: 2012

The Perth International Track Cycling Grand Prix is an Australia track cycling competition, held at the Perth SpeedDome in Perth, Western Australia. First held in 2000, the event has received UCI category 3 status, allowing UCI points to be allocated to countries endeavouring to gain sufficient points to qualify for the UCI Track Cycling World Championships since 2009. The events registered with the UCI are: Sprint, Keirin, Points Race and Scratch Race (both men's and women's).

== Men's ==
=== Sprint ===
Year	Winner	Second	Third
2009	(Australia) Shane Perkins	(Australia) Scott Sunderland	(Australia) Jason Niblett
2010	(Germany) Stefan Nimke	(Australia) Scott Sunderland	(Netherlands) Teun Mulder
2012	(Japan) Kazunari Watanabe	(Netherlands) Matthijs Büchli	(Netherlands) Roy van den Berg

=== Keirin ===
Year	Winner	Second	Third
2009	(Australia) Shane Perkins	(Australia) Jason Niblett	(Australia) Scott Sunderland
2010	(Australia) Scott Sunderland	(Germany) Robert Förstemann	(Germany) René Enders
2012	(Netherlands) Teun Mulder	(South Africa) Jeanne Nell	(Australia) Jason Niblett

=== Points race ===
Year	Winner	Second	Third
2009	(Australia) Cameron Meyer	(Australia) Michael Freiberg	(China) Luke Durbridge
2010	(Australia) Michael Freiberg	(Germany) Zach Bell	(Australia) Cameron Meyer
2012	(Germany) Nikias Arndt	(Australia) Michael Freiberg	(Australia) Stephen Hall

=== Scratch race ===
Year	Winner	Second	Third
2009	(Australia) Cameron Meyer	(Australia) Graeme Brown	(China) Po Hung Wo
2010	(Australia) Cameron Meyer	(Australia) Stephen Hall	(Australia) Michael Freiberg
2012	(Switzerland) Cyrille Thièry	(Switzerland) Claudio Imhof	(Switzerland) Loïc Perizzolo

== Women's ==
=== Points race ===
Year	Winner	Second	Third
2009	(Australia) Josie Tomic	(Netherlands) Ellen van Dijk	(United States) Theresa Cliff-Ryan
2010	(Germany) Charlotte Becker	(United States) Theresa Cliff-Ryan	(Australia) Jessica Allen
2012	(Germany) Charlotte Becker	(New Zealand) Gemma Dudley	(Germany) Madeleine Sandig

=== Scratch race ===
Year	Winner	Second	Third
2009	(Australia) Josie Tomic	(Netherlands) Ellen van Dijk	(United States) Theresa Cliff-Ryan
2010	(Germany) Elke Gebhardt	(Russia) Evgenia Romanyuta	(Germany) Charlotte Becker
2012	(Germany) Charlotte Becker	(New Zealand) Joanne Keisanowski	(Australia) Isabella King

=== Sprint ===
Year	Winner	Second	Third
2009	(Australia) Anna Meares	(Netherlands) Willy Kanis	(Australia) Kaarle McCulloch
2010	(Lithuania) Simona Krupeckaitė	(Germany) Kristina Vogel	(Netherlands) Willy Kanis
2012	(Netherlands) Willy Kanis	(Netherlands) Yvonne Hijgenaar	(New Zealand) Natasha Hansen

=== Keirin ===
Year	Winner	Second	Third
2009	(Netherlands) Kaarle McCulloch	(Netherlands) Willy Kanis	(Australia) Anna Meares
2010	(Lithuania) Simona Krupeckaitė	(Germany) Kristina Vogel	(Germany) Miriam Welte
2012	(Netherlands) Willy Kanis	(Netherlands) Yvonne Hijgenaar	(Russia) Elina Brezniva
