= 2012 European Track Championships – Men's keirin =

UEC European Champion jersey

The Men's keirin was held on 21 October 2012. 27 riders participated.

== Medalists ==
Gold	Tobias Wächter (GER)
Silver	Joachim Eilers (GER)
Bronze	Denis Dmitriev (RUS)

== Results ==
=== Heats ===
First 2 riders in each heat qualified for the second round, remainder went to first round repechage. It was held at 11:11.

==== Heat 1 ====
Rank	Name	Nation	Notes
1	Matthew Crampton	Great Britain	Q
2	Tobias Wächter	Germany	Q
3	Rafal Sarnecki	Poland	
4	Rigard van Klooster	Netherlands	
5	Charlie Conord	France	
6	Siamen Zaikouski	Belarus	

==== Heat 2 ====
Rank	Name	Nation	Notes
1	Christos Volikakis	Greece	Q
2	Lewis Oliva	Great Britain	Q
3	Julien Palma	France	
4	Francesco Ceci	Italy	
5	Vladislav Novik	Belarus	
6	Miroslav Minchev	Bulgaria	
7	Wille-Oskari Riihela	Finland	

==== Heat 3 ====
Rank	Name	Nation	Notes
1	Denis Dmitriev	Russia	Q
2	Joachim Eilers	Germany	Q
3	Pavel Kelemen	Czech Republic	
4	Matthijs Büchli	Netherlands	
5	Jani Mikkonen	Finland	
6	Artem Frolov	Ukraine	
–	Davit Askurava	Georgia	DNS

==== Heat 4 ====
Rank	Name	Nation	Notes
1	Nikita Shurshin	Russia	Q
2	Adam Ptáčník	Czech Republic	Q
3	Kamil Kuczyński	Poland	
4	Airidas Videika	Lithuania	
5	Andriy Vynokurov	Ukraine	
6	Christos Tserentzoulias	Greece	
7	Eoin Mullen	Ireland	

=== Repechages ===
First rider in each heat qualify for the second round. It was held at 11:45.

==== Heat 1 ====
Rank	Name	Nation	Notes
1	Rafal Sarnecki	Poland	Q
2	Miroslav Minchev	Bulgaria	
3	Jani Mikkonen	Finland	
4	Airidas Videika	Lithuania	

==== Heat 2 ====
Rank	Name	Nation	Notes
1	Julien Palma	France	Q
2	Matthijs Büchli	Netherlands	
3	Eoin Mullen	Ireland	
4	Artem Frolov	Ukraine	
5	Siamen Zaikouski	Belarus	

==== Heat 3 ====
Rank	Name	Nation	Notes
1	Pavel Kelemen	Czech Republic	Q
2	Francesco Ceci	Italy	
3	Christos Tserentzoulias	Greece	
4	Charlie Conord	France	

==== Heat 4 ====
Rank	Name	Nation	Notes
1	Rigard van Klooster	Netherlands	Q
2	Andriy Vynokurov	Ukraine	
3	Kamil Kuczyński	Poland	
4	Wille-Oskari Riihela	Finland	
5	Vladislav Novik	Belarus	

=== Round 2 ===
First 3 riders in each heat qualified for the final, remainder went to the 7–12 final. It was held at 17:00.

==== Heat 1 ====
Rank	Name	Nation	Notes
1	Joachim Eilers	Germany	Q
2	Lewis Oliva	Great Britain	Q
3	Rafal Sarnecki	Poland	Q
4	Nikita Shurshin	Russia	
5	Matthew Crampton	Great Britain	
6	Rigard van Klooster	Netherlands	

==== Heat 2 ====
Rank	Name	Nation	Notes
1	Tobias Wächter	Germany	Q
2	Christos Volikakis	Greece	Q
3	Denis Dmitriev	Russia	Q
4	Adam Ptáčník	Czech Republic	
5	Julien Palma	France	
6	Pavel Kelemen	Czech Republic	

=== Finals ===
It was held at 18:09.

==== Final 7–12 places ====
Rank	Name	Nation	Notes
7	Matthew Crampton	Great Britain	
8	Adam Ptáčník	Czech Republic	
9	Nikita Shurshin	Russia	
10	Pavel Kelemen	Czech Republic	
11	Julien Palma	France	
12	Rigard van Klooster	Netherlands	

==== Final ====
Rank	Name	Nation	Notes
1st place, gold medalist(s)	Tobias Wächter	Germany	
2nd place, silver medalist(s)	Joachim Eilers	Germany	
3rd place, bronze medalist(s)	Denis Dmitriev	Russia	
4	Rafal Sarnecki	Poland	
5	Christos Volikakis	Greece	
6	Lewis Oliva	Great Britain	
