= Barry Markus =

Dutch cyclist

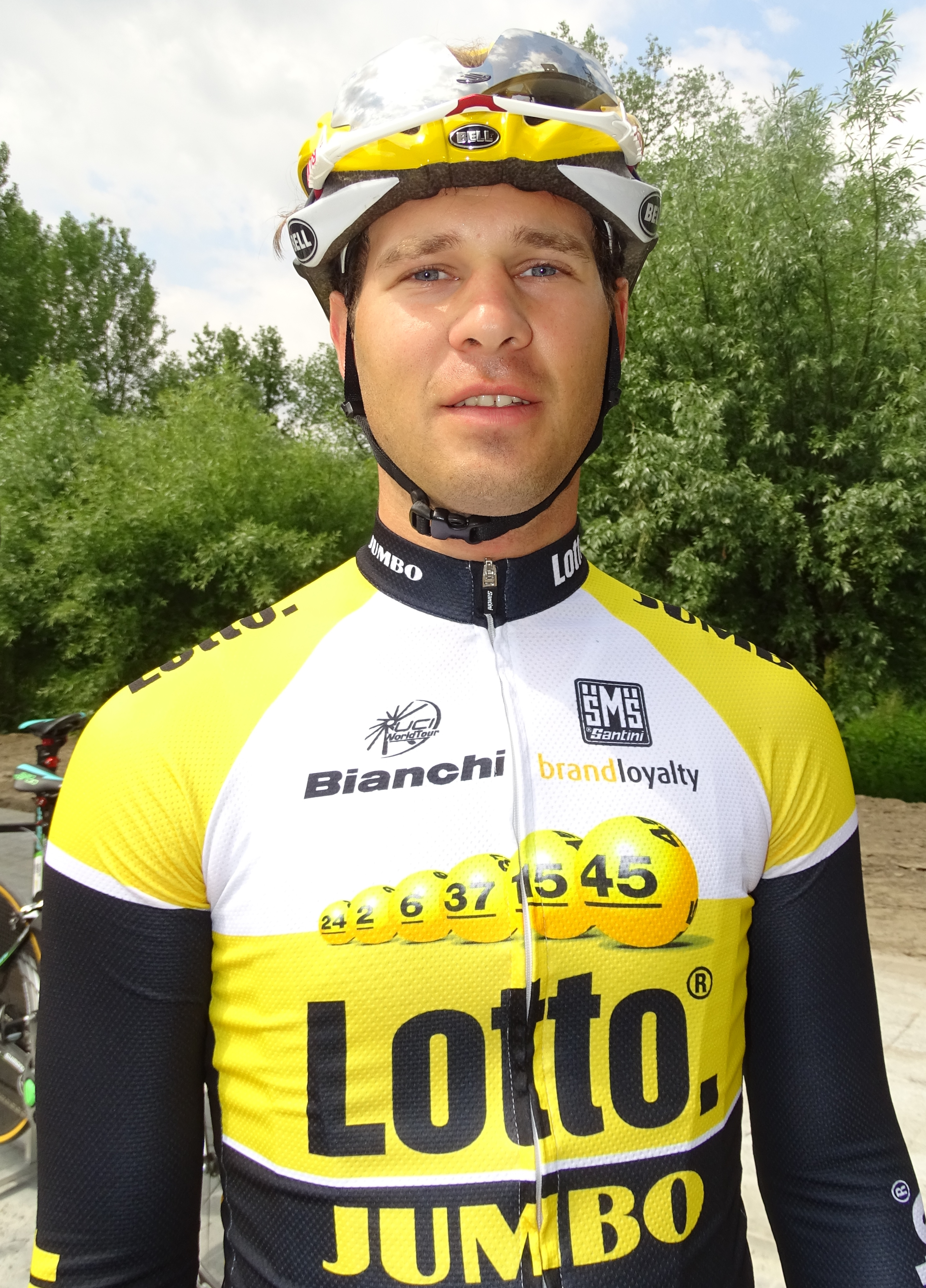
- Markus in 2015

Personal information
- Full name: Barry Markus
- Born: 17 July 1991 (age 35) Amsterdam, the Netherlands
- Height: 1.79 m (5 ft 10 in)
- Weight: 72 kg (159 lb)

Cycling career
- Sport: Cycling
- Discipline: Road
- Role: Rider
- Rider type: Sprinter

Amateur teams
- 2010–2011: Rabobank Continental Team
- 2011: Vacansoleil–DCM (stagiaire)

Professional teams
- 2012–2013: Vacansoleil–DCM
- 2014–2015: Belkin Pro Cycling
- 2016: Roompot–Oranje Peloton
- 2017: Pauwels Sauzen–Vastgoedservice
- 2017–2018: Monkey Town Continental Team

Barry Markus (born 17 July 1991 in Amsterdam) is a Dutch professional racing cyclist, who last rode for UCI Continental team Monkey Town Continental Team.

His younger sister Kelly Markus is also a cyclist.

== Major results ==
2008
3rd Time trial, National Junior Road Championships
4th Road race, UCI Juniors World Championships
6th Paris–Roubaix Juniors
2009
1st Stage 1 Trofeo Karlsberg
2nd Overall GP Général Patton
2nd Road race, UEC European Junior Road Championships
3rd Madison, National Track Championships (with Yoeri Havik)
3rd Paris–Roubaix Juniors
2010
1st Stage 2 Thüringen Rundfahrt der U23
National Track Championships

2nd Madison (with Yoeri Havik)
3rd Points race
3rd Scratch

9th Beverbeek Classic
10th Ronde van Drenthe
2011
National Track Championships

1st Madison (with Roy Pieters)
3rd Scratch

1st Ster van Zwolle
1st Dorpenomloop Rucphen
Vuelta Ciclista a León

1st Stages 1 & 2b (TTT)

2nd Grand Prix de la ville de Nogent-sur-Oise
10th Overall Ronde van Drenthe
2012
2nd Dwars door Drenthe
3rd Scratch, UEC European Under-23 Track Championships
3rd Scratch, National Track Championships
5th Memorial Rik Van Steenbergen
8th Dutch Food Valley Classic
2013
3rd Scheldeprijs
9th Grand Prix de Denain
10th Overall Arctic Race of Norway
2014
2nd Rund um Köln
10th Nokere Koerse
2015
2nd Dwars door Drenthe
7th Nokere Koerse
2016
8th Arnhem–Veenendaal Classic
