= 2008 UCI Track Cycling World Championships – Men's individual pursuit =

Men's individual pursuit at the 2008 UCI Track Cycling World Championships
- Venue: Manchester Velodrome
- Location: Manchester, United Kingdom
- Date: 26 March 2008
- Winning time: 4:18.519

Medalists
gold medal	Bradley Wiggins	Great Britain
silver medal	Jenning Huizenga	Netherlands
bronze medal	Alexei Markov	Russia

The Men's individual pursuit event of the 2008 UCI Track Cycling World Championships was held on 26 March 2008.

== Results ==
=== Qualifying ===
Rank	Name	Nation	1000 m	2000 m	3000 m	Time	Speed (km/h)	
1	Jenning Huizenga	Netherlands	1:07.767 (2)	2:10.401 (2)	3:13.400 (3)	4:16.3	56.174	Q
2	Bradley Wiggins	United Kingdom	1:07.380 (1)	2:09.406 (1)	3:12.488 (1)	4:17.0	56.025	Q
3	Alexei Markov	Russia	1:09.498 (14)	2:11.977 (6)	3:14.898 (4)	4:18.2	55.761	q
4	Hayden Roulston	New Zealand	1:08.114 (3)	2:10.531 (3)	3:13.369 (2)	4:18.3	55.741	q
5	Bradley McGee	Australia	1:08.890 (8)	2:11.714 (5)	3:14.984 (5)	4:20.4	55.293	
6	David O'Loughlin	Ireland	1:08.575 (6)	2:12.650 (10)	3:16.236 (6)	4:20.9	55.191	
7	Luke Roberts	Australia	1:08.974 (9)	2:12.623 (9)	3:17.029 (9)	4:21.9	54.984	
8	Taylor Phinney	United States	1:09.127 (12)	2:13.305 (14)	3:17.523 (12)	4:22.4	54.886	
9	Antonio Tauler Llull	Spain	1:09.654 (15)	2:13.070 (13)	3:17.093 (10)	4:22.7	54.824	
10	Volodymyr Dyudya	Ukraine	1:09.217 (13)	2:12.524 (8)	3:17.159 (11)	4:22.7	54.809	
11	Alexander Serov	Russia	1:09.686 (16)	2:12.286 (7)	3:16.369 (7)	4:22.7	54.806	
12	Dominique Cornu	Belgium	1:10.323 (19)	2:14.199 (15)	3:18.628 (16)	4:22.8	54.797	
13	Sergi Escobar Roure	Spain	1:08.161 (4)	2:11.190 (4)	3:16.513 (8)	4:24.1	54.519	
14	Jens Mouris	Netherlands	1:10.519 (21)	2:14.763 (16)	3:18.572 (15)	4:24.5	54.447	
15	Marc Ryan	New Zealand	1:10.473 (20)	2:14.998 (18)	3:19.563 (17)	4:24.8	54.385	
16	Robert Bartko	Germany	1:08.987 (10)	2:12.955 (12)	3:17.578 (13)	4:25.1	54.31	
17	Phillip Thuaux	Australia	1:09.111 (11)	2:15.140 (20)	3:20.790 (18)	4:26.4	54.048	
18	Vitaliy Popkov	Ukraine	1:08.756 (7)	2:12.713 (11)	3:18.469 (14)	4:27.0	53.924	
19	Sun Jae Jang	South Korea	1:12.510 (22)	2:18.376 (22)	3:22.946 (21)	4:28.4	53.652	
20	Carlos Alzate	Colombia	1:10.107 (17)	2:14.814 (17)	3:21.300 (19)	4:29.9	53.344	
21	Jairo Pérez	Colombia	1:10.119 (18)	2:15.015 (19)	3:21.661 (20)	4:33.5	52.65	
22	Dominique Stark	Switzerland	1:08.238 (5)	2:15.903 (21)	3:25.357 (22)	4:36.4	52.101	
23	Chun Kai Feng	Chinese Taipei	1:13.731 (23)	2:23.228 (23)	3:31.146 (23)	4:40.8	51.29	
24	Vadim Shaekhov	Uzbekistan	1:17.414 (24)	2:27.017 (24)	3:34.637 (24)	4:41.8	51.094	
25	Robert Bengsch	Germany				DSQ	54.073	

=== Finals ===
Rank	Name	Nation	1000 m	2000 m	3000 m	Time	Speed (km/h)
Bronze medal race
3rd place, bronze medalist(s)	Alexei Markov	Russia	1:08.615 (1)	2:11.772 (1)	3:15.638 (1)	04:21.1	55.151
4	Hayden Roulston	New Zealand	1:09.864 (2)	2:12.992 (2)	3:17.835 (2)	04:23.7	54.615
Gold medal race
1st place, gold medalist(s)	Bradley Wiggins	United Kingdom	1:08.615 (1)	2:11.444 (1)	3:14.173 (1)	04:18.5	55.701
2nd place, silver medalist(s)	Jenning Huizenga	Netherlands	1:08.715 (2)	2:12.563 (2)	3:17.530 (2)	04:23.5	54.654
