= Nils van 't Hoenderdaal =

Dutch track cyclist

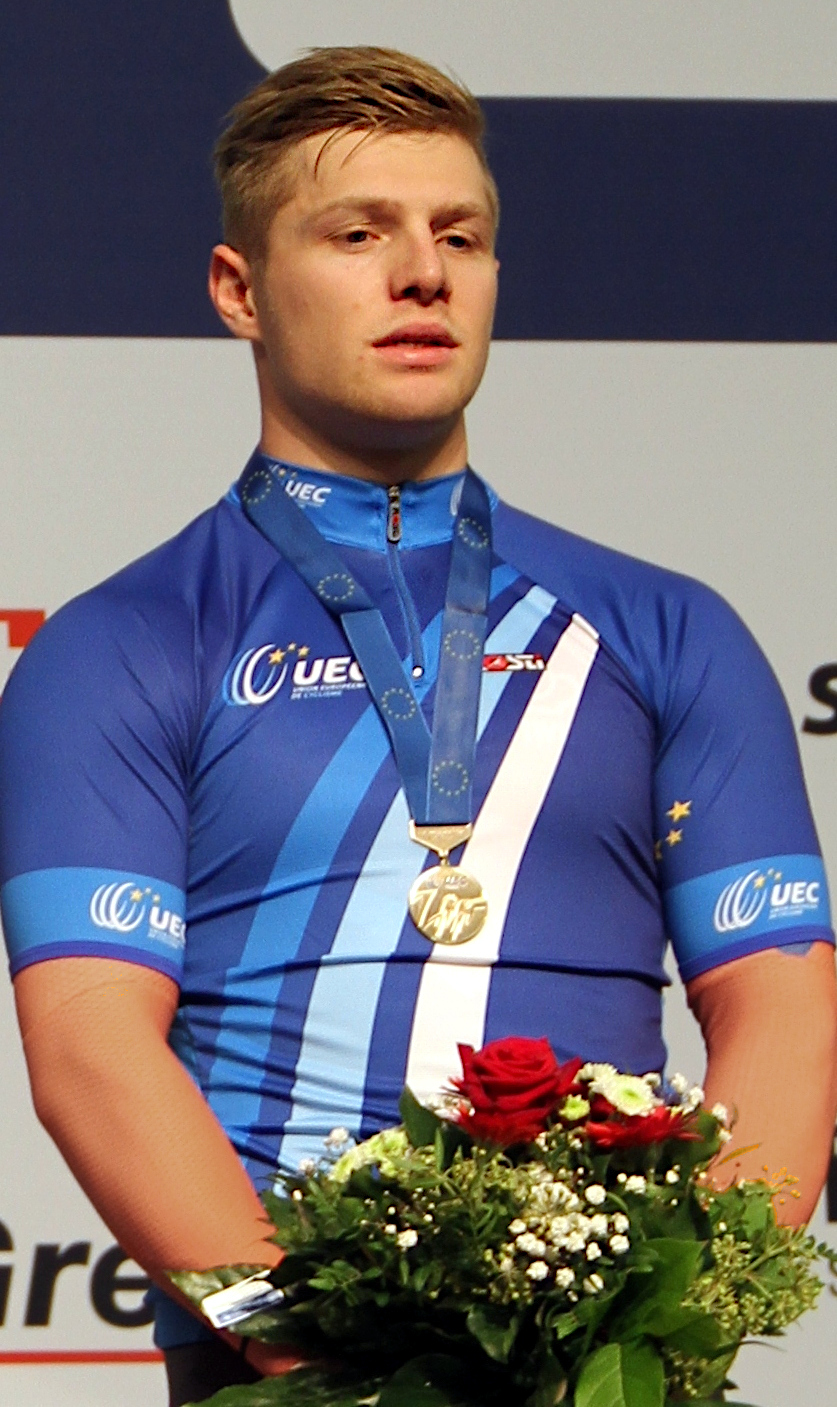
- Nils van 't Hoenderdaal (r.), European Champion team sprint

Personal information
- Born: 3 October 1993 (age 33) Amsterdam, Netherlands

Cycling career
- Sport: Cycling
- Discipline: Track cycling
Medal record
World Championships
Gold medal – first place	2018 Apeldoorn	Team sprint
Silver medal – second place	2016 London	Team sprint
Silver medal – second place	2017 Hong Kong	Team sprint
European Games
Gold medal – first place	2019 Minsk	Team sprint
European Championships
Gold medal – first place	2015 Grenchen	Team sprint
Gold medal – first place	2018 Glasgow	Team sprint

Nils van 't Hoenderdaal (born 3 October 1993) is a Dutch former track cyclist.

== Career ==
In 2011 Van 't Hoenderdaal competed at the 2011 Dutch National Track Championships in the men's sprint and men's keirin, but did not win a medal. A year later at the 2012 Dutch National Track Championships he won the silver medal in the men's keirin. Internationally he won the team sprint at the third round of the 2013–14 UCI Track Cycling World Cup in Aguascalientes, Mexico together with Hugo Haak and Matthijs Büchli. He won the gold medal in the team sprint at the 2015 UEC European Track Championships in Grenchen, Switzerland, together with Jeffrey Hoogland and Hugo Haak.
