= 2012 UCI Road World Championships – Women's junior time trial =

Women's junior time trial
2012 UCI Road World Championships

Race details
- Dates: 18 September 2012
- Stages: 1

The Women's junior time trial of the 2012 UCI Road World Championships was a cycling event that took place on 18 September 2012 in Limburg, the Netherlands.

== Final classification ==
	Cyclist	Nation		Time
1	Elinor Barker	Great Britain	in	22' 26.29"
2	Cecilie Uttrup Ludwig	Denmark	+	35.87"
3	Demi de Jong	Netherlands		1' 03.13"
4	Emily Roper	Australia		1' 08.18"
5	Ramona Forchini	Switzerland		1' 10.42"
6	Eva Mottet	France		1' 11.59"
7	Christina Siggaard	Denmark		1' 13.26"
8	Corinna Lechner	Germany		1' 13.35"
9	Nicky Zijlaard	Netherlands		1' 14.84"
10	Lourdes Oyarbide Jimenez	Spain		1' 15.26"
11	Lotte Kopecky	Belgium		1' 19.07"
12	Corine van der Zijden	Netherlands		1' 22.74"
13	Stella Riverditi	Italy		1' 23.16"
14	Alicja Ratajczak	Poland		1' 26.56"
15	Anastasiia Iakovenko	Russia		1' 26.80"
16	Dana Lodewyks	Belgium		1' 27.46"
17	Georgia Baker	Australia		1' 28.47"
18	Addyson Albershardt	United States		1' 29.23"
19	Allison Rice	Australia		1' 32.00"
20	Katarzyna Niewiadoma	Poland		1' 32.71"
21	Grace Alexander	United States		1' 36.64"
22	Gulnaz Badykova	Russia		1' 38.99"
23	Hanna Helamb	Sweden		1' 39.13"
24	Anna Knauer	Germany		1' 39.49"
25	Milda Jankauskaitė	Lithuania		1' 41.15"
26	Simona Bortolotti	Italy		1' 43.73"
27	Alexandra Nessmar	Sweden		1' 47.07"
28	Yao Pang	Hong Kong		1' 55.35"
29	Manon Bourdiaux	France		1' 56.35"
30	Zavinta Titenyte	Lithuania		1' 57.71"
31	Heidi Dalton	South Africa		2' 07.04"
32	Sheyla Gutiérrez Ruiz	Spain		2' 08.26"
33	Claudia Buitrago Calderon	Colombia		2' 13.16"
34	Katsiaryna Piatrouskaya	Belarus		2' 21.25"
35	Erika Varela Huerta	Mexico		2' 22.63"
36	Antonela Ferencic	Croatia		2' 34.07"
37	Allyson Gillard	Canada		3' 06.37"
38	Aliaksandra Kazlova	Belarus		3' 22.49"
39	Olga Shekel	Ukraine		3' 36.91"
40	Saskia Kowalchuk	Canada		4' 47.56"
