= Yvonne Hijgenaar =

Dutch cyclist (born 1980)

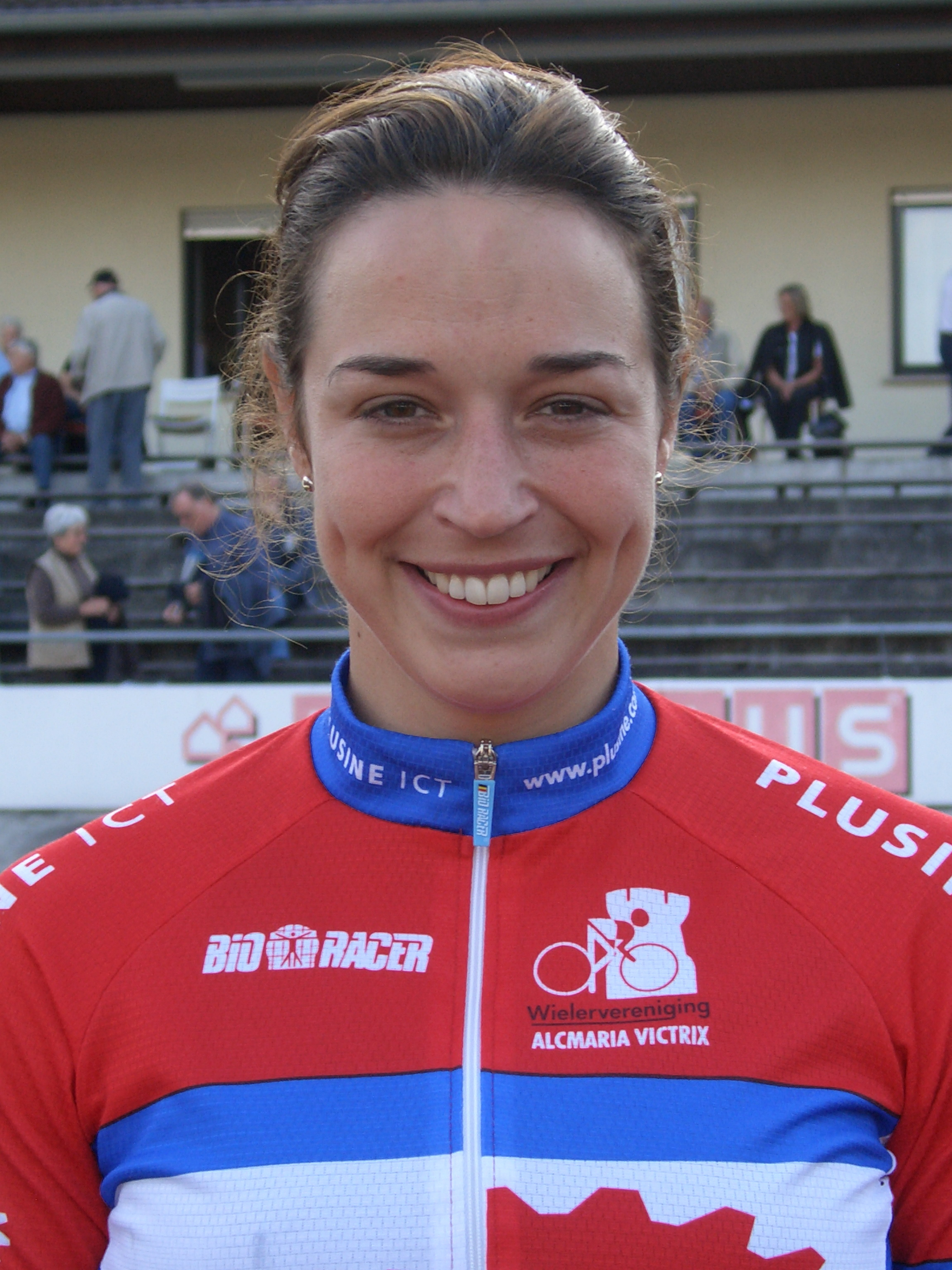

Personal information
- Full name: Yvonne Hijgenaar
- Born: 15 May 1980 (age 46) Alkmaar, Netherlands
- Height: 1.71 m (5 ft 7 in)
- Weight: 67 kg (148 lb; 10.6 st)

Cycling career
- Sport: Cycling
- Discipline: Track
- Role: Rider

Major wins
- (Netherlands) National champion x12
Medal record
Representing Netherlands
Women's track cycling
World Championships
Silver medal – second place	2007 Palma de Mallorca	Team sprint
Bronze medal – third place	2005 Los Angeles	Time trial
Bronze medal – third place	2005 Los Angeles	Keirin
Bronze medal – third place	2009 Pruszków	Omnium

Yvonne Hijgenaar (born 15 May 1980 in Alkmaar) is a Dutch racing cyclist and former national speed skater.

== Background ==
Hijgenaar is a former speed skater who for two years was in the Netherlands national team. In 2001, she switched from skating to track cycling after finding she rode so much better than she skated that she could often ride by male riders in training. When her former skating teammates made technical advances better than she could, she stayed permanently in cycling.

"When I look at the number of national championships, world championships and an Olympic Games that I've ridden, I am happy with my choice," she said.

== Olympic Games ==
Hijgenaar represented the Netherlands at the 2004 Summer Olympics in Athens where she took part in the individual sprint as well as the 500 metres time trial. She did not impress in the individual sprint where she finished 11th. However, her 500 metres time trial time of 34.532 (52.125 km/h) brought her fifth place.

In November 2007 she trained with the national team of Australia in preparation for the 2008 Summer Olympics in Beijing. "Track racing in the Netherlands is a small sport and we do not have a coaching team available for 12 months of the year as they do in Australia. If only we did." she said.

At the 2008 Summer Olympics, she took part in the women's sprint, again finishing in 11th place.

At the 2012 Summer Olympics, Hijgenaar and teammate Willy Kanis came 5th in the women's team sprint.

== 2009 World Championships ==
Hijgenaar won her fourth World Championship medal on 28 March 2009, taking the bronze medal in the Omnium, the first time the competition had been included for women in the World Championships. She was on equal points with Tara Whitten of Canada but missed out on that medal despite winning the 200 m flying start time trial and 500 m time trial events in the omnium.

She has now set the London Olympics of 2012 as a possible end to her career. If she fails to win a medal, she predicts she will stop.

== Career highlights ==
2001
1st 500 m, Dutch National Track Championships
2nd Sprint, Dutch National Track Championships

2002
3rd European Championship, Track, 500 m, U23
1st 500 m, Dutch National Track Championships
1st Sprint, Dutch National Track Championships

2003
3rd Sydney, 500 m (AUS)
1st 500 m, Dutch National Track Championships
1st Keirin, Dutch National Track Championships
1st Sprint, Dutch National Track Championships

2004
1st 500 m, Dutch National Track Championships
1st Keirin, Dutch National Track Championships
1st Sprint, Dutch National Track Championships
3rd Moscow, 500 m (RUS)
3rd Moscow, Team Sprint (RUS)
1st Manchester, 500 m (GBR)
1st Sydney, 500 m (AUS)
2nd Athens Open Balkan Championship, Track, Sprint, Elite/U23 (GRE)
2nd Moscow, 500 m (RUS)

2005
3rd Los Angeles, 500 m (USA)
3rd Sydney, Sprint (AUS)
1st Sydney, 500 m (AUS)
3rd 500 m, Track World Championships
3rd Keirin, Track World Championships
2nd Manchester, 500 m (GBR)
1st Sprint, Dutch National Track Championships
1st 500 m, Dutch National Track Championships
1st Keirin, Dutch National Track Championships

2006
3rd Los Angeles, 500 m (USA)
1st Sydney, 500 m (AUS)
3rd Sydney, 500 m (AUS)
1st Moscow, Team Sprint (RUS)

2007
1st Los Angeles, Team Sprint (USA)
2nd Manchester, 500 m (GBR)
1st Manchester, Team Sprint (GBR)
2nd Team Sprint, Track World Championships
1st Sydney, Team Sprint (AUS)
1st Beijing, Team Sprint (CHN)
2nd Sprint, 2007 Dutch National Track Championships, Alkmaar
1st 500 m time trial, 2007 Dutch National Track Championships, Alkmaar
2nd Keirin, 2007 Dutch National Track Championships, Alkmaar

2008 (Vrienden van het Platteland)
2nd Team Pursuit, 2007–2008 UCI Track Cycling World Cup Classics, Copenhagen
1st Los Angeles, Team Sprint (USA)

2009 (DSB Bank-LTO)
3rd Omnium, Track World Championships
2nd Team Sprint, 2009–2010 UCI Track Cycling World Cup Classics, Manchester
2nd Team Sprint, 2009–2010 UCI Track Cycling World Cup Classics, Melbourne
1st Team Sprint, 2009–2010 UCI Track Cycling World Cup Classics, Cali
2nd Sprint, 2009 Dutch National Track Championships, Alkmaar
2nd 500 m time trial, 2009 Dutch National Track Championships, Alkmaar
3rd Keirin, 2009 Dutch National Track Championships, Alkmaar

2010
3rd 2010 Dutch National Omnium Championships
2nd Sprint, 2010 Dutch National Track Championships, Apeldoorn
2nd 500 m time trial, 2010 Dutch National Track Championships, Apeldoorn
2nd Keirin, 2010 Dutch National Track Championships, Apeldoorn

2011
1st Sprint, 2011 Dutch National Track Championships, Apeldoorn
2nd 500 m time trial, 2011 Dutch National Track Championships, Apeldoorn
3rd Keirin, 2011 Dutch National Track Championships, Apeldoorn

2012
1st Sprint, 2012 Dutch National Track Championships, Apeldoorn
1st 500 m time trial, 2012 Dutch National Track Championships, Apeldoorn
3rd Keirin, 2012 Dutch National Track Championships, Apeldoorn

== National record, team pursuit ==
After the introduction of the women's 3000m team pursuit at the 2007–08 track cycling season, Hijgenaar was two times part of the team pursuit squad when they established a (new) Dutch national record. The first one was the first time the Dutch team rode the team pursuit, and was broken later that day. She is not the record holder anymore.

Time	Speed (km/h)	Cyclists	Event	Location of race	Date	Ref
3:36.901	49.792	Ellen van Dijk; Marlijn Binnendijk; Yvonne Hijgenaar	2007–08 UCI Track Cycling World Cup Classics – Round 4 (Qualification)	(Denmark) Copenhagen	17 February 2008	
3:32.666	50.783	Ellen van Dijk; Marlijn Binnendijk; Yvonne Hijgenaar	2007–08 UCI Track Cycling World Cup Classics – Round 4 (Gold medal race)	(Denmark) Copenhagen	17 February 2008	

== See also ==
- List of Dutch Olympic cyclists
