= 2012 Dutch National Track Championships =

- Venue: Apeldoorn, Netherlands
- Date: December 27–December 30, 2012
- Velodrome: Omnisport Apeldoorn

The 2012 Dutch National Track Championships was the annual national championship for track cycling in the Netherlands. They took place in Apeldoorn, the Netherlands from December 27 to December 30, 2012.

== Medal summary ==
Event	Gold	Silver	Bronze
Men's events
Men's sprint	Matthijs Büchli	Hugo Haak	Hylke van Grieken
Men's 1 km time trial	Hugo Haak	Theo Bos	Yondi Schmidt
Men's keirin	Hugo Haak	Nils van 't Hoenderdaal	Matthijs Büchli
Men's individual pursuit	Jenning Huizenga	Tim Veldt	Dion Beukeboom
Men's scratch	Tim Veldt	Jenning Huizenga	Barry Markus
Men's points race	Wim Stroetinga	Raymond Kreder	Tim Veldt
Men's madison	Raymond Kreder; Michel Kreder	Michael Vingerling; Dylan van Baarle	Léon van Bon; Geert Jan Jonkman
Women's events
Women's sprint	Yvonne Hijgenaar	Elis Ligtlee	Yesna Rijkhoff
Women's 500 m time trial	Yvonne Hijgenaar	Elis Ligtlee	Shanne Braspennincx
Women's keirin	Elis Ligtlee	Yvonne Hijgenaar	Shanne Braspennincx
Women's individual pursuit	Kirsten Wild	Amy Pieters	Laura van der Kamp
Women's scratch	Kirsten Wild	Kelly Markus	Amy Pieters
Women's points race	Roxane Knetemann	Kirsten Wild	Vera Koedooder
Women's madison	Marianne Vos; Roxane Knetemann	Laura van der Kamp; Kirsten Wild	Amy Pieters; Kelly Markus

Results from nkbaanwielrennen.nl
