= Jenning Huizenga =

Dutch cyclist (born 1984)

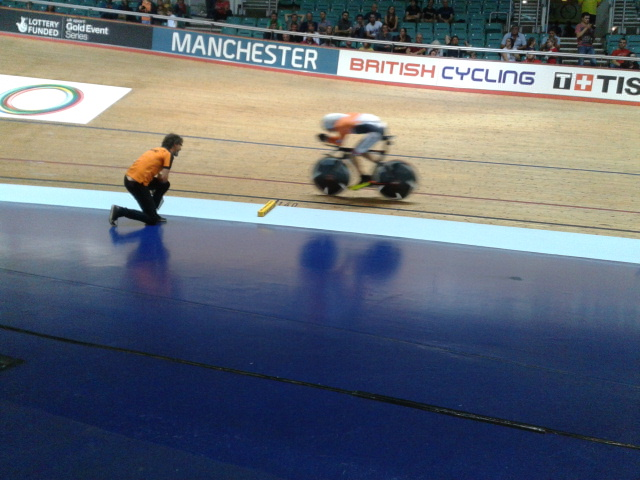

Personal information
- Full name: Jenning Hein Huizenga
- Born: 29 March 1984 (age 42) Franeker, the Netherlands
- Height: 1.85 m (6 ft 1 in)
- Weight: 72 kg (159 lb)

Cycling career
- Sport: Cycling
- Current team: Retired
- Disciplines: Road and track
- Role: Rider

Amateur teams
- 2005: Team Moser–AH–Trentino
- 2006: Cycling Team Jo Piels
- 2007: Löwik Meubelen
- 2013: Team Ruiter Dakkapellen

Professional teams
- 2012: Rabobank Continental Team
- 2014–2015: Parkhotel Valkenburg Continental Team
Medal record
Representing the Netherlands
Men's track cycling
World Championships
| Silver medal – second place | 2008 Manchester | Individual pursuit |
European Championships
| Bronze medal – third place | 2013 Apeldoorn | Team pursuit |

Jenning Huizenga (born 29 March 1984, in Franeker) is a Dutch former professional racing cyclist.

== Major results ==
=== Track ===
2006
3rd Individual pursuit, National Championships
2007
3rd Team pursuit, Beijing, 2007–08 UCI World Cup
1st Individual pursuit, National Championships
2008
2nd Individual pursuit, Los Angeles, 2007–08 UCI World Cup
2nd Individual pursuit, UCI World Championships
2011
National Championships

1st Individual pursuit
2nd Scratch

3rd Team pursuit, Astana, 2011–12 UCI World Cup
2012
National Championships

1st Individual pursuit
2nd Scratch

2013
1st Overall Individual pursuit, 2013–14 UCI World Cup

1st Guadalajara

National record, Team pursuit, Manchester, 2013–14 UCI World Cup (3:03.033)
3rd Team pursuit, European Championships

=== Road ===
2011
2nd Overall Tour de Moselle

1st Stage 2

2012
1st Stage 2 Olympia's Tour
2nd Overall Tour of China II
7th Overall Tour of China I

== See also ==
- List of Dutch Olympic cyclists
