= Nicky Zijlaard =

Dutch cyclist

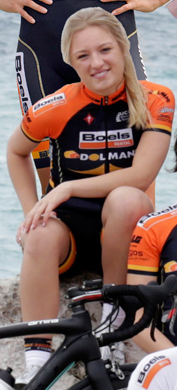
- Nicky Zijlaard in 2014

Personal information
- Born: 21 November 1995 (age 30) Rotterdam, Netherlands

Cycling career
- Sport: Cycling
- Role: Rider

Professional team
- 2014: Boels–Dolmans

Nicky Zijlaard (born 21 November 1995) is a former Dutch professional racing cyclist.

== Cycling family ==
Zijlaard comes from a renowned cycling family. Grandfather Joop Zijlaard is a famous former pacer who ran a pub named after his moustache (NL: snor). Father Ron took over both pacing and the family business. Uncle Michael is a former cyclist who is best known for marrying and supporting Leontien van Moorsel, managing women's professional team AA Drink–leontien.nl, men's Pro Continental team Roompot and organising the Six Days of Rotterdam. Brother Maikel Zijlaard is also a professional cyclist.

Nicky Zijlaard married professional cyclist Nick van der Lijke with whom she has a daughter. In 2022 they briefly took over Crossanterie De Snor, but due to her health issues they handed the business back to her parents.

== Main results ==
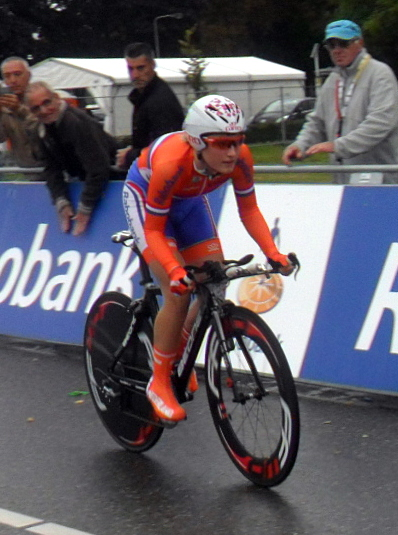
Nicky Zijlaard at the UCI Road World Championships Valkenburg - Women's junior time trial, in 2012

2011
1st Dutch National Track Championships - junior women: individual pursuit, points race and scratch.
6th Dutch National Championships Madison, women elite
2012
3rd Dutch National Championships Road Race, junior women
4th Dutch National Championships Madison, women elite, with Nina Kessler
9th 2012 UCI Road World Championships – Women's junior time trial
2013
1st Individual time trial and overall win Omloop van Borsele junior edition
6th 2013 European Road Championships – Women's junior time trial
2014
1st Dutch national derny champion, women elite, with her father Ron as pacer
2nd Dutch National Championships Madison, women elite, with Nina Kessler.

== See also ==
- 2014 Boels Dolmans Cycling Team season
