= Kelly Markus =

Dutch cyclist (born 1993)

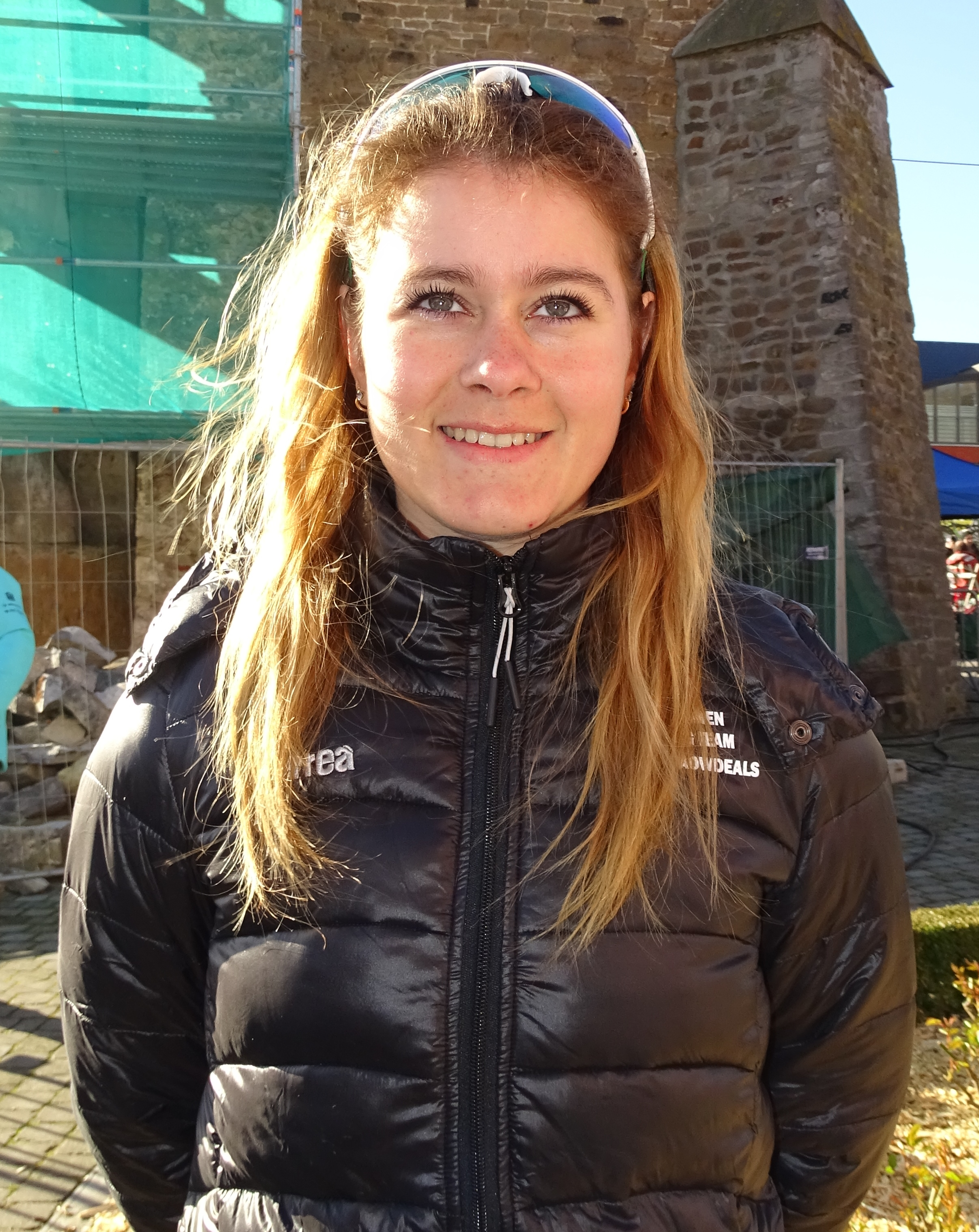
- Markus in 2016

Personal information
- Full name: Kelly Markus
- Born: 7 February 1993 (age 33) Amsterdam, Netherlands

Cycling career
- Sport: Cycling
- Disciplines: Road; Track
- Role: Rider

Amateur team
- 2011: Skil Koga (stagiaire)

Professional teams
- 2012–2013: Skil 1t4i
- 2014–2015: Team Rytger
- 2016–2021: Lares–Waowdeals

Kelly Markus (born 7 February 1993) is a Dutch road and track racing cyclist, who most recently rode for UCI Women's Continental Team Doltcini–Van Eyck–Proximus.

She won the bronze medal as a junior in the points race on the track at the 2011 European Track Championships. Markus competed at the UCI Road World Championships in the 2012 women's team time trial and the 2011 Junior women's road race. Together with Amy Pieters, she won the Dutch Madison national title in 2014.

Her older brother Barry Markus is also a professional cyclist. The siblings are not related to cyclist Riejanne Markus.

== Major results ==
=== Track ===
2011
2nd Madison, National Track Championships (with Amy Pieters)
2012
National Track Championships

2nd Scratch
3rd Madison (with Amy Pieters)

2013
National Track Championships

1st Madison (with Amy Pieters)
3rd Omnium

International Belgian Open

2nd Scratch
3rd Points race

2nd Points race, Ballerup Points Event
2014
National Track Championships

1st Madison (with Amy Pieters)
3rd Derny
3rd Scratch

2015
National Track Championships

2nd Madison (with Amy Pieters)
3rd Omnium
3rd Scratch

2016
National Track Championships

2nd Madison (with Winanda Spoor)
2nd Omnium

=== Road ===
2011
9th Road race, UCI Junior Road World Championships
2015
3rd Omloop van de IJsseldelta
8th Road race, UEC European Under-23 Road Championships
8th Parel van de Veluwe
10th Grand Prix de Dottignies
10th Trofee Maarten Wynants
2018
6th GP Sofie Goos

== See also ==
- 2011 Skil Koga season
- 2012 Team Skil-Argos season
- 2013 Team Argos-Shimano season
