= Willy Kanis =

Dutch cyclist (born 1984)

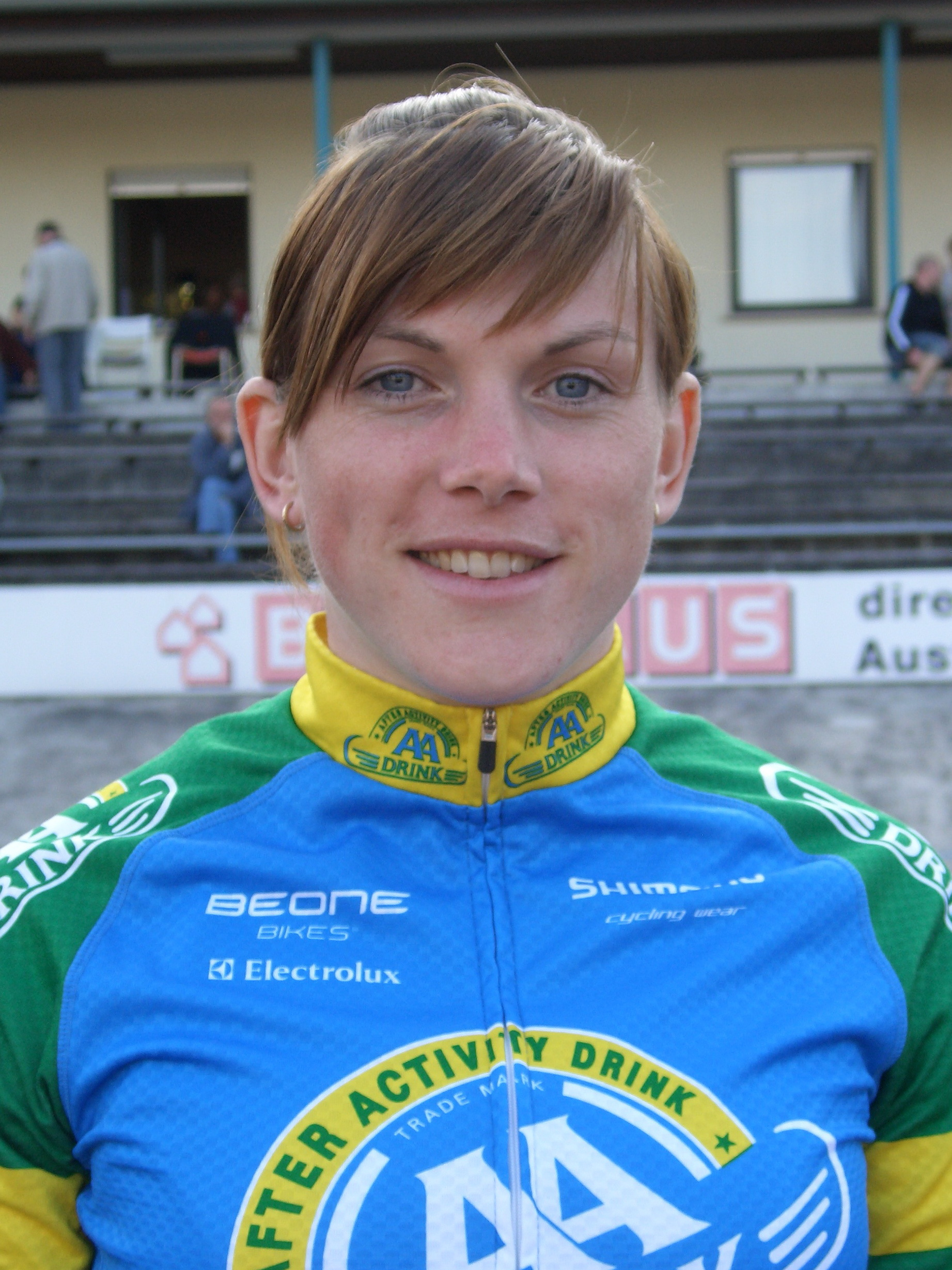

Personal information
- Full name: Willy Kanis
- Born: 27 July 1984 (age 42) Kampen, the Netherlands

Cycling career
- Sport: Cycling
- Current team: AA Drink–leontien.nl
- Disciplines: Track & BMX
- Role: Rider
- Rider type: Sprinter

Professional teams
- 2008: Vrienden van het Platteland
- 2010–12: AA Drink–leontien.nl

Willy Kanis (born 27 July 1984 in Kampen) is a Dutch female professional racing cyclist.

== Career highlights ==
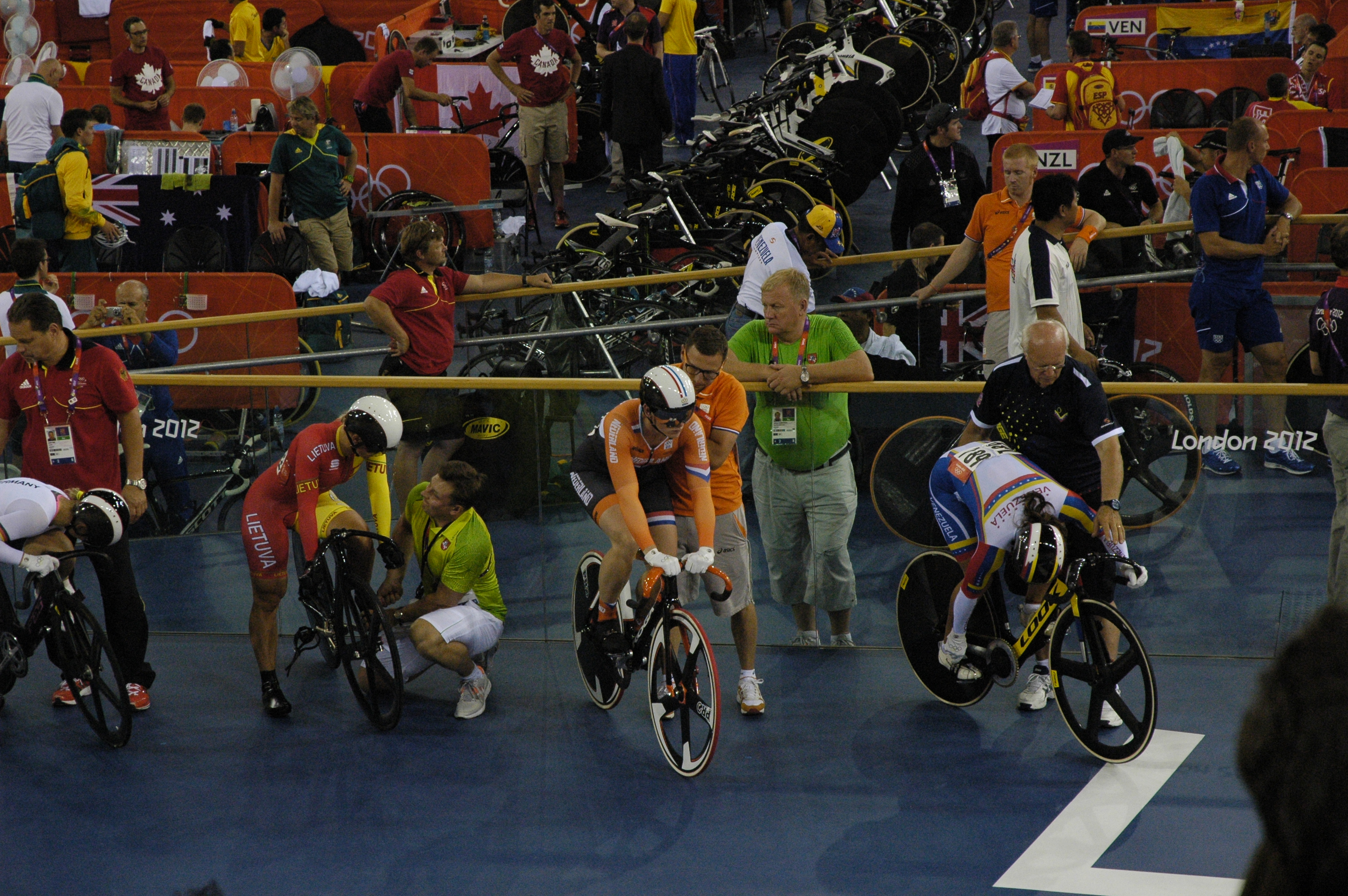
Willy Kanis at the 2012 Summer Olympics (Women's keirin)

2003
2nd 500 m, Dutch National Track Championships
2nd Sprint, Dutch National Track Championships
2004
2nd 500 m, Dutch National Track Championships
3rd Keirin, Dutch National Track Championships
2nd Sprint, Dutch National Track Championships
3rd Team Sprint, UCI Track Cycling World Cup Classics, Moscow
2005
1st BMX World Championships
2nd Sprint, Dutch National Track Championships
2nd 500 m, Dutch National Track Championships
2006
1st BMX World Championships
1st Team Sprint, UCI Track Cycling World Cup Classics, Moscow
1st 500 m, 2006 Dutch National Track Championships
1st Sprint, 2006 Dutch National Track Championships
1st Keirin, 2006 Dutch National Track Championships
2007
2nd 500 m, UCI Track Cycling World Cup Classics, Los Angeles
1st Team Sprint, UCI Track Cycling World Cup Classics, Los Angeles
1st Team Sprint, UCI Track Cycling World Cup Classics, Manchester
2nd Team Sprint, UCI Track Cycling World Championships, Palma de Mallorca
1st Sprint, UCI Track Cycling World Cup Classics, Sydney
3rd 500 m, UCI Track Cycling World Cup Classics, Sydney
1st Team Sprint, UCI Track Cycling World Cup Classics, Sydney
1st Team Sprint, UCI Track Cycling World Cup Classics, Beijing
1st Keirin, UCI Track Cycling World Cup Classics, Beijing
1st Sprint, 2007 Dutch National Track Championships
1st Keirin, 2007 Dutch National Track Championships
2008 – Vrienden van het Platteland 2008 season
3rd Sprint, UCI Track Cycling World Cup Classics, Los Angeles
2nd 500 m, UCI Track Cycling World Cup Classics, Los Angeles
1st Team Sprint, UCI Track Cycling World Cup Classics, Los Angeles
2nd Keirin, UCI Track Cycling World Cup Classics, Los Angeles
1st 500 m, 2008 Dutch National Track Championships
1st Sprint, 2008 Dutch National Track Championships
1st Keirin, 2008 Dutch National Track Championships
2009
1st Keirin, 2008–09 UCI Track Cycling World Ranking
2nd Team Sprint, 2009–2010 UCI Track Cycling World Cup Classics, Manchester
3rd 500m TT, 2009–2010 UCI Track Cycling World Cup Classics, Manchester
2nd Team Sprint, 2009–2010 UCI Track Cycling World Cup Classics, Melbourne
3rd Sprint, 2009–2010 UCI Track Cycling World Cup Classics, Melbourne
1st Team Sprint, 2009–2010 UCI Track Cycling World Cup Classics, Cali
2nd 500m TT, 2009–2010 UCI Track Cycling World Cup Classics, Cali
2nd Sprint, 2009–2010 UCI Track Cycling World Cup Classics, Cali
1st 500 m, 2009 Dutch National Track Championships
1st Sprint, 2009 Dutch National Track Championships
1st Keirin, 2009 Dutch National Track Championships
2010
1st 500 m, 2010 Dutch National Track Championships
1st Sprint, 2010 Dutch National Track Championships
1st Keirin, 2010 Dutch National Track Championships
2011 – AA Drink-leontien.nl 2011 season
2nd 500 m, 2011 Dutch National Track Championships
1st Sprint, 2011 Dutch National Track Championships
1st Keirin, 2011 Dutch National Track Championships

== See also ==
- List of Dutch Olympic cyclists
