= Yesna Rijkhoff =

Dutch cyclist (born 1992)

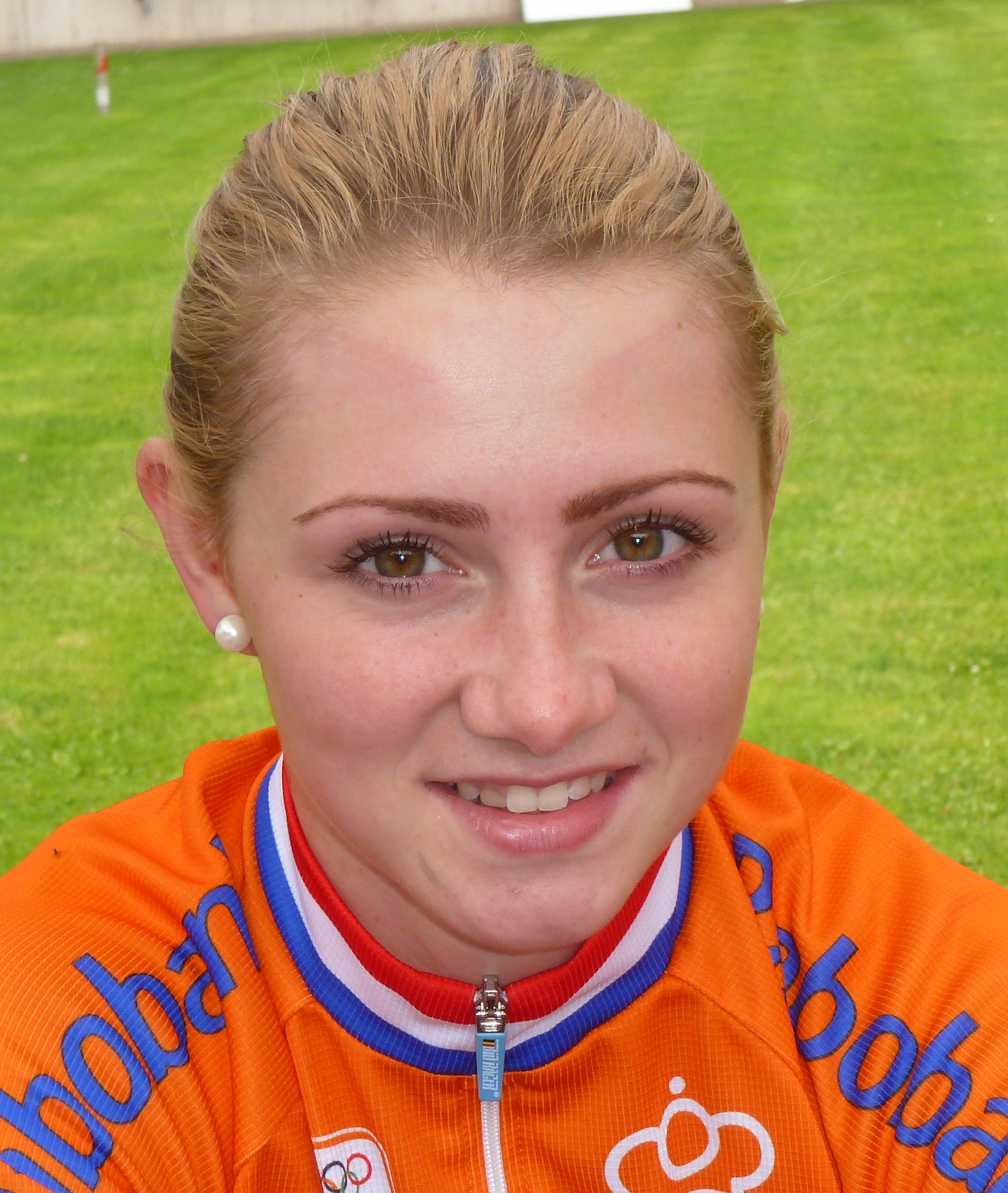
- Rijkhoff in 2012

Personal information
- Born: 9 December 1992 (age 33) Netherlands

Cycling career
- Sport: Cycling
- Discipline: Track cycling

Yesna Rijkhoff (born 9 December 1992) is a track cyclist from Netherlands. She represented her nation at the 2015 UCI Track Cycling World Championships.

== Career results ==
2012
3rd Team Sprint, UEC European U23 Track Championships (with Shanne Braspennincx)
2013
Grand Prix Sprint Apeldoorn

2nd Keirin
3rd Sprint

3rd Sprint, Revolution – Round 2, Glasgow
3rd Keirin, UEC European U23 Track Championships
2014
2nd Keirin, Revolution – Round 3, Manchester
2nd Team Sprint, UEC European U23 Track Championships (with Elis Ligtlee)
3rd Sprint, US Sprint GP
3rd Sprint, Champions of Sprint
3rd Scratch Race, Fastest Man on Wheels
3rd Sprint, Festival of Speed
3rd Sprint, Sprintermeeting
2015
Milton International Challenge

1st Keirin
2nd Sprint
2nd Team Sprint (with Kyra Lamberink)

Independence Day Grand Prix

1st 500m Time Trial
2nd Keirin
3rd Sprint

Grand Prix of Colorado Springs

1st Team Sprint (with Laurine van Riessen)
3rd Sprint

U.S. Vic Williams Memorial Grand Prix

1st Keirin
1st Sprint
2nd 500m Time Trial
