= 2011 Dutch National Track Championships – Women's 500 m time trial =

Women's 500 m time trial
2011 Dutch National Track Championships

Race details
- Dates: 27 December 2011
- Stages: 1
- Distance: 500 m (1,640 ft)
- Winning time: 34.899

Medalists
	Gold	Willy Kanis
	Silver	Yvonne Hijgenaar
	Bronze	Laura van der Kamp

The women's 500 m time trial at the 2011 Dutch National Track Championships in Apeldoorn took place at Omnisport Apeldoorn on December 27, 2011. 12 athletes participated in the contest. Willy Kanis won the gold medal, Yvonne Hijgenaar took silver and Laura van der Kamp won the bronze.

== Results ==
Rank	Name	Time
1st place, gold medalist(s)	Willy Kanis	34.899
2nd place, silver medalist(s)	Yvonne Hijgenaar	35.256
3rd place, bronze medalist(s)	Laura van der Kamp	36.113
4	Kirsten Wild	37.300
5	Shanne Braspennincx	38.006
6	Marie-Louise Konkelaar	38.227
7	Aafke Eshuis	38.576
8	Anneloes Stoelwinder	38.633
9	Yesna Rijkhoff	39.237
10	Winanda Spoor	39.274
11	Iris Slappendel	39.508
12	Judith Bloem	41.492

Results from uci.ch.
