= Hugo Haak =

Dutch cyclist

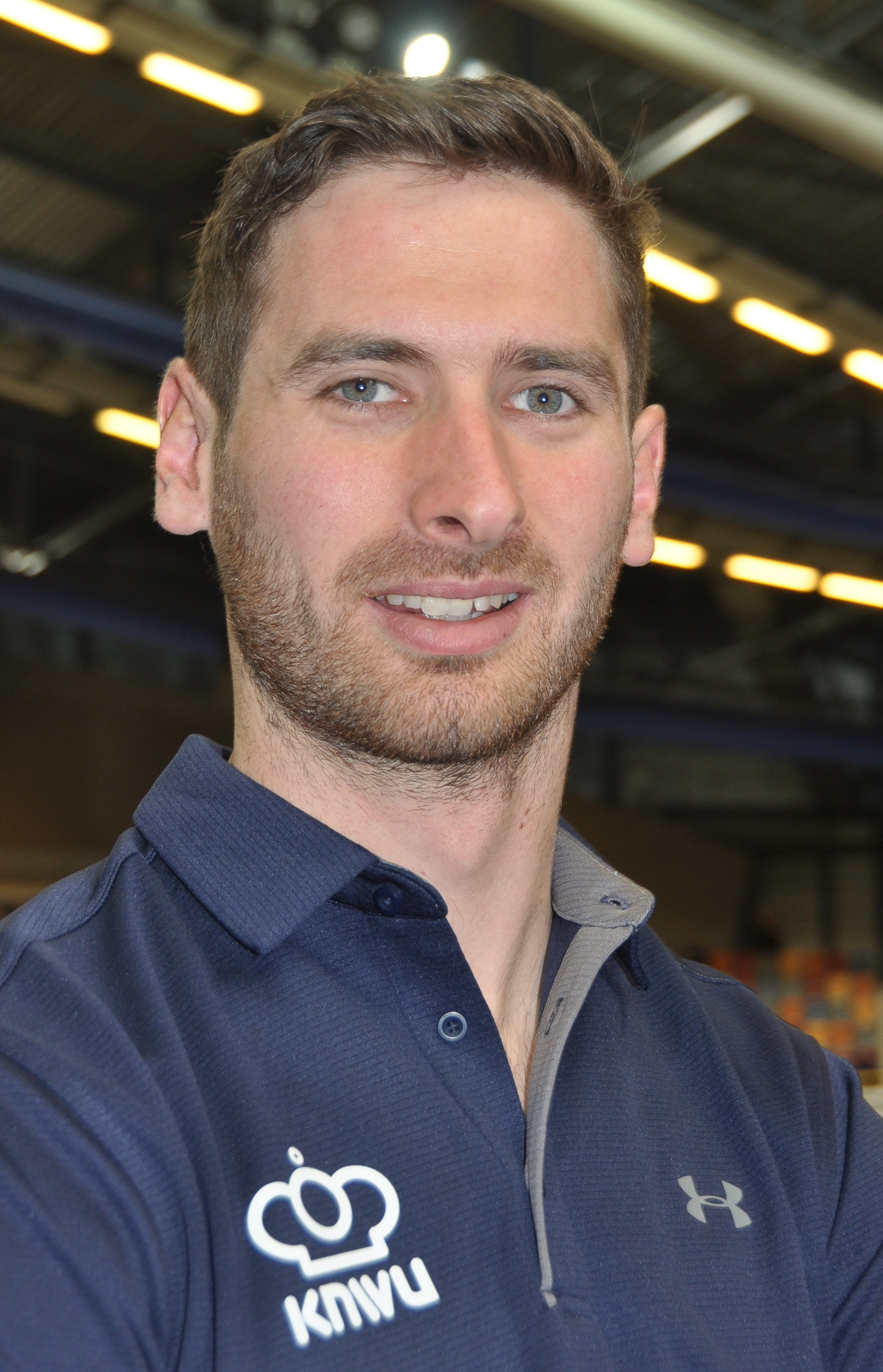
- Haak (2018)

Personal information
- Born: 29 October 1991 (age 34) Nieuwegein, Netherlands

Cycling career
- Sport: Cycling
- Discipline: Track cycling
- Rider type: Sprinter
Medal record
Men's track cycling
Representing Netherlands
World Championships
Silver medal – second place	2016 London	Team sprint
European Championships
Gold medal – first place	2015 Grenchen	Team sprint

Hugo Haak (born 29 October 1991) is a Dutch track cyclist and revered coach. He represented his nation at the 2011, 2012, 2013, 2014 and 2015 UCI Track Cycling World Championships. At the 2016 UCI Track Cycling World Championships he won the silver medal in the team sprint. At the 2015 UEC European Track Championships he became European Champion in the team sprint. Haak is a five time Dutch National Champion: twice in the individual time trial, once in keirin, individual sprint and team sprint.

== Biography ==
=== Younger years ===
As a kid, Haak was encouraged to sport. His parents put him on judo, so he could learn how to fall. His main sport would be field hockey. His interest in cycling grew when he saw his uncle and nephew riding recreative tours and he watched the spring classics and the Tour de France. A kid down the road was a member of road racing club Rennersclub Jan van Arckel, and Haak went along with him and was hooked. He joined the club at age 12 and quit hockey two years later, because the matches and races were both on Saturdays, and he preferred the successes and more competitive nature of cycling.

=== From the road to track races ===
The focus of his junior years was to enjoy himself while cycling. He wasn't a lazy cyclist, but his peers were more fanatic, trained more and progressed faster. At a track cycling clinic of the Royal Dutch Cycling Union, Haak discovered that while he lost the winning streak on the road, on the track he could beat his peers. His talent was confirmed when he won a silver medal at the Sprint and a bronze medal at Keirin, at the 2008 Dutch Junior Track Championships. This led to an invitation to stay and train at the Dutch National Sports Centre Papendal. In his last year of high school (VWO), Haak devoted two days of the week to track cycling at Papendal. His roommate was Matthijs Büchli. When Haak and Büchli, the top 2 riders of the Netherlands, ended up on 63rd and 64th place at the sprint of the 2009 Junior World Championships in Moscow, they got inspired to do better.

=== Part of the Dutch national sprint team ===
National coach René Wolff added Haak to the national team and laid the foundations of the Dutch successes in later years. The focus was put on performing as a team, and individual successes would follow accordingly. The 2012 London Olympic Games came too early for the young team, but the successes grew and culminated in a bronze medal at the 2013 European U23 Championships (with Büchli and Jeffrey Hoogland), a gold medal at the 2015 European Championships (with Nils van 't Hoenderdaal and Hoogland) and a silver medal at the 2016 World Championships (with Van 't Hoenderdaal, Hoogland and Büchli). The team successes inspired Theo Bos and Roy van den Berg to return to track cycling. Bos performed better than Haak at the Dutch selection ride-off in Roubaix in July 2016, and Haak was not selected to join the 2016 Olympic TeamNL.

=== Individual successes ===
In the 2010–11 UCI Track Cycling World Cup Classics Haak won silver in Beijing, China, at the 1 km time trial. He won a silver medal at the 2012 European Under 23 Championships at the 1 kilometer individual time trial, and a bronze medal at the 2013 European U23 Championships at the 200 meter sprint. In the 2013–14 UCI Track Cycling World Cup he won a gold medal in Guadalajara, Mexico, at the sprint and bronze at the 1 km time trial. From 2010 to 2016 he won 5 gold medals, 11 silver medals and a bronze at the Dutch National Track Championships. His gold medals were won twice in the individual time trial (2012, 2013), once in keirin (2012), individual sprint (2013) and team sprint (2016).

=== Switch from athlete to coach ===
The Rio Olympic Games had been the main focus of Haak's career. When this adventure abruptly ended, it was a huge deception. To make things worse, he tore a meniscus while training for the 2017 World Championships. While being injured, Haak went to Hong Kong with the team, where he was roommate and mentor of Harrie Lavreysen who had recently switched from BMX racing. Haak's first knee operation failed to solve the injury and during a second operation about 90% of the meniscus was removed. This caused Haak to end his active cycling career at age 26. Haak was now approached by NOC*NSF to join their program of training retired athletes to become coaches and returning them to their original teams. Haak accepted the job and on January 1, 2018, he became assistant to the new national coach Bill Huck who took over from Wolff. When Huck left later that year, Haak took over.

=== Success as a coach ===
In three years, 2019 to 2021, the Dutch track racers won 26 golden, 12 silver, and 4 bronze medals on Olympic, Worlds and European Games and Championships. Haak was chosen twice, by his peers, to be the Dutch Coach of the Year.
