= 2011 Dutch National Track Championships =

- Venue: Apeldoorn, Netherlands
- Date: December 27–December 30, 2011
- Velodrome: Omnisport Apeldoorn
- Events: 14 (elite)

The 2011 Dutch National Track Championships were the Dutch national Championship for track cycling. They took place in Apeldoorn, the Netherlands from December 27 to December 30, 2011.

== Medal summary ==
| Event | Gold | Silver | Bronze |
|---|---|---|---|
Men's Events
| Men's sprint | Teun Mulder | Hugo Haak | Roy van den Berg |
| Men's 1 km time trial | Teun Mulder | Matthijs Büchli | Yondi Schmidt |
| Men's keirin | Roy van den Berg | Hugo Haak | Matthijs Büchli |
| Men's individual pursuit | Jenning Huizenga | Levi Heimans | Michael Vingerling |
| Men's scratch | Tim Veldt | Jenning Huizenga | Barry Markus |
| Men's points race | Nick Stopler | Tim Veldt | Wim Stroetinga |
| Men's madison | Barry Markus; Roy Pieters | Yoeri Havik; Niki Terpstra | Peter Schep; Wim Stroetinga |
Women's Events
| Women's sprint | Yvonne Hijgenaar | Willy Kanis | Shanne Braspennincx |
| Women's 500 m time trial | Willy Kanis | Yvonne Hijgenaar | Laura van der Kamp |
| Women's keirin | Willy Kanis | Yvonne Hijgenaar | Shanne Braspennincx |
| Women's individual pursuit | Ellen van Dijk | Kirsten Wild | Amy Pieters |
| Women's scratch | Kirsten Wild | Nathalie van Gogh | Roxane Knetemann |
| Women's points race | Kirsten Wild | Amy Pieters | Roxane Knetemann |
| Women's madison | Ellen van Dijk; Kirsten Wild | Amy Pieters; Kelly Markus | Vera Koedooder; Winanda Spoor |
