= Winanda Spoor =

Dutch road cyclist (born 1991)

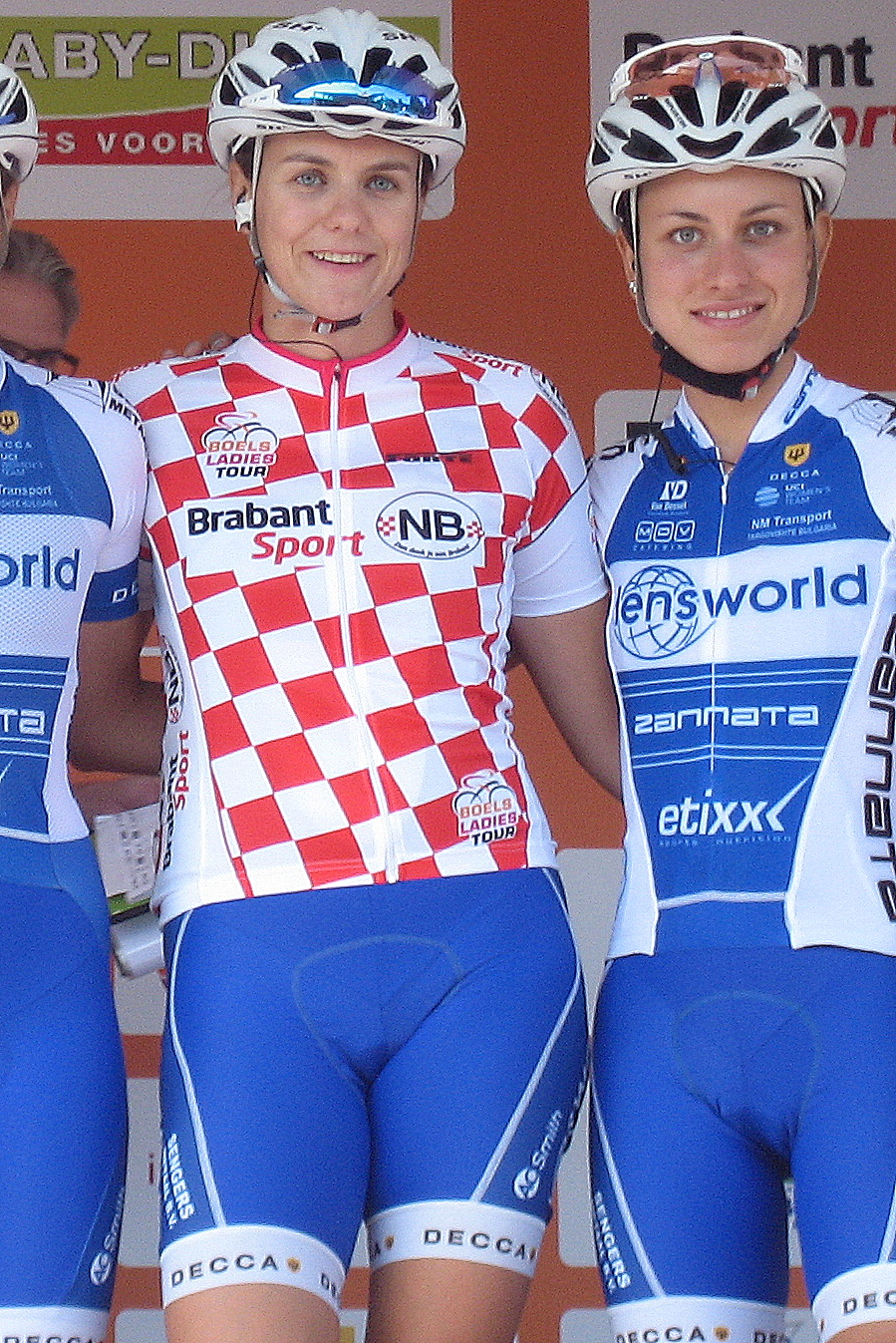
- Spoor (left) in the sprint jersey of 2016 Holland Ladies Tour

Personal information
- Full name: Winanda Spoor
- Born: 27 January 1991 (age 35) Rijswijk, Netherlands

Cycling career
- Sport: Cycling
- Discipline: Road
- Role: Rider

Amateur teams
- 2013–2015: RC Jan van Arckel
- 2018: RC Jan van Arckel
- 2019: Fast Chance p/b THTF

Professional teams
- 2010–2012: Dolmans Landscaping Team
- 2016–2017: Lensworld–Kuota
- 2018: WNT–Rotor Pro Cycling

Winanda Spoor (born 27 January 1991) is a Dutch road cyclist, who last rode for American amateur team Fast Chance p/b THTF. She participated at the 2012 UCI Road World Championships in the Women's team time trial for the Dolmans–Boels team. She was one of the riders at Lensworld–Kuota left without a team when it folded just before the 2018 season, so she rode for her club team for a few months before being picked up by WNT–Rotor Pro Cycling at the end of May 2018.

Nowadays, Winanda Spoor is no longer active as a cyclist, but works as a recruitment and talent coach for Paracycling at the KNWU.

== Major results ==
2008
7th Time trial, UEC European Junior Road Championships
9th Time trial, UCI Juniors World Championships
2011
1st Knokke-Heist–Bredene
2014
1st Stage 4 Tour de Feminin-O cenu Českého Švýcarska
2015
1st Club rider classification Energiewacht Tour
9th Omloop van de IJsseldelta
2017
1st Sprints classification Holland Ladies Tour
