= Dutch National Track Championships =

The Dutch National Track Championships are the set of Dutch national championship events for the various disciplines and distances in track cycling. They are organized by the KNWU. There are competitions of various track cycling disciplines in age, gender and disability categories. Women's events are shorter than men's. Championships are open to all licensed riders.

The winner of a national championship discipline receives a gold medal and a national jersey. Silver and bronze medals are awarded to the second and third place contestants. National champions wear their national jersey until the following year's championship, but they may wear it only in the type of event in which they won it. Former champions can wear rainbow cuffs to their everyday jerseys.

== Disciplines ==
In many years not all the disciplines were contested during the same event.

Discipline	Men's	Women's
Sprint	Men's sprint	Women's sprint
Individual pursuit	Men's individual pursuit	Women's individual pursuit
Points race	Men's points race	Women's points race
Scratch race	Men's scratch	Women's scratch
Keirin	Men's keirin	Women's keirin
Time trial	Men's 1 km time trial	Women's 500 m time trial
Omnium	Men's omnium	Women's omnium
Madison	Men's Madison	Women's madison

== Competitions ==
Year	Date	City	Velodrome	Men's Disciplines	Women's Disciplines
1897				Men's sprint	
1898				Men's sprint	
1899				Men's sprint	
1900				Men's sprint	
1901				Men's sprint	
1902				Men's sprint	
1903				Men's sprint	
1904				Men's sprint	
1906				Men's sprint	
1907				Men's sprint	
1908				Men's sprint	
1909				Men's sprint	
1910				Men's sprint	
1911				Men's sprint	
1912				Men's sprint	
1913				Men's sprint	
1914				Men's sprint	
1915				Men's sprint	
1916				Men's sprint	
1917				Men's sprint	
1918				Men's sprint	
1919				Men's sprint	
1920				Men's sprint	
1921				Men's sprint	
1922				Men's sprint	
1923				Men's sprint	
1924				Men's sprint	
1925				Men's sprint	
1926				Men's sprint	
1927				Men's sprint	
1928				Men's sprint	
1929				Men's sprint	
1930				Men's sprint	
1931				Men's sprint	
1932				Men's sprint	
1933				Men's sprint	
1934				Men's sprint	
1935				Men's sprint Men's individual pursuit	
1936				Men's sprint Men's individual pursuit	
1937				Men's sprint Men's individual pursuit	
1938				Men's sprint Men's individual pursuit	
1939				Men's sprint Men's individual pursuit	
1940				Men's sprint Men's individual pursuit	
1941				Men's sprint Men's individual pursuit	
1942				Men's sprint Men's individual pursuit	
1943				Men's sprint Men's individual pursuit	
1944				Men's sprint Men's individual pursuit	
1945				Men's sprint Men's individual pursuit	
1946				Men's sprint Men's individual pursuit	
1947				Men's sprint Men's individual pursuit	
1948				Men's sprint Men's individual pursuit	
1949				Men's sprint Men's individual pursuit	
1950				Men's sprint Men's individual pursuit	
1951				Men's sprint Men's individual pursuit	
1952				Men's sprint Men's individual pursuit	
1953				Men's sprint Men's individual pursuit	
1954				Men's sprint Men's individual pursuit	
1955				Men's sprint Men's individual pursuit	
1956				Men's sprint Men's individual pursuit	
1957				Men's sprint Men's individual pursuit	
1958				Men's sprint Men's individual pursuit	
1959				Men's sprint Men's individual pursuit	
1960				Men's sprint Men's individual pursuit	
1961				Men's sprint Men's individual pursuit	
1962				Men's sprint Men's individual pursuit	
1963				Men's sprint Men's individual pursuit	
1964				Men's sprint Men's individual pursuit	
1965				Men's sprint Men's individual pursuit Men's 1 km time trial	
1966				Men's sprint Men's individual pursuit Men's 1 km time trial	
1967				Men's sprint Men's individual pursuit Men's 1 km time trial	
1968				Men's sprint Men's individual pursuit Men's 1 km time trial	
1969				Men's sprint Men's individual pursuit Men's 1 km time trial	
1970				Men's sprint Men's individual pursuit Men's 1 km time trial	
1971				Men's sprint Men's individual pursuit Men's 1 km time trial	
1972				Men's sprint Men's individual pursuit Men's 1 km time trial	
1973				Men's sprint Men's individual pursuit Men's 1 km time trial	
1974				Men's sprint Men's individual pursuit Men's 1 km time trial Men's omnium	
1975				Men's sprint Men's individual pursuit Men's 1 km time trial Men's omnium	
1976				Men's sprint Men's individual pursuit Men's 1 km time trial	
1977		Rotterdam			Women's omnium
1977				Men's sprint Men's individual pursuit Men's 1 km time trial	
1978		Rotterdam			Women's omnium
1978				Men's sprint Men's individual pursuit Men's 1 km time trial	Women's sprint Women's individual pursuit
1979		Rotterdam			Women's omnium
1979				Men's individual pursuit	
1980				Men's sprint Men's individual pursuit Men's 1 km time trial	
1981					Women's omnium
1981				Men's individual pursuit Men's 1 km time trial	
1982		Rotterdam			Women's omnium
1982				Men's individual pursuit Men's 1 km time trial	
1983		Rotterdam			Women's omnium
1983				Men's individual pursuit Men's points race Men's 1 km time trial	
1984				Men's individual pursuit Men's points race Men's 1 km time trial	
1985				Men's individual pursuit Men's points race Men's 1 km time trial	Women's sprint Women's individual pursuit
1986	-2- August			Men's 1 km time trial Men's points race	Women's sprint Women's individual pursuit
1987				Men's 1 km time trial	Women's sprint Women's individual pursuit
1988				Men's 1 km time trial	Women's omnium
1989		Alkmaar	Sportpaleis Alkmaar		Women's omnium
1989				Men's 1 km time trial	Women's sprint Women's individual pursuit Women's points race
1990	July	Alkmaar	Sportpaleis Alkmaar	Men's 1 km time trial	
1991		Alkmaar	Sportpaleis Alkmaar	Men's 1 km time trial	Women's sprint Women's individual pursuit Women's points race
1992	July	Alkmaar	Sportpaleis Alkmaar	Men's 1 km time trial	Women's sprint Women's individual pursuit Women's points race
1993	July	Alkmaar	Sportpaleis Alkmaar	Men's 1 km time trial	Women's sprint Women's individual pursuit Women's points race
1994				Men's sprint Men's individual pursuit Men's points race Men's keirin Men's 1 km time trial	Women's sprint Women's individual pursuit Women's points race Women's 500 m time trial
1995				Men's sprint Men's individual pursuit Men's points race Men's keirin Men's 1 km time trial	Women's sprint Women's individual pursuit Women's points race Women's 500 m time trial
1996				Men's sprint Men's individual pursuit Men's points race Men's keirin Men's 1 km time trial Men's madison	Women's sprint Women's individual pursuit Women's points race Women's 500 m time trial
1997				Men's sprint Men's individual pursuit Men's points race Men's keirin Men's 1 km time trial	Women's sprint Women's individual pursuit Women's points race Women's 500 m time trial
1998				Men's sprint Men's individual pursuit Men's points race Men's keirin Men's 1 km time trial	Women's sprint Women's individual pursuit Women's points race Women's 500 m time trial
1999	20–24 July			Men's omnium	
1999				Men's sprint Men's individual pursuit Men's points race Men's keirin Men's 1 km time trial	Women's sprint Women's individual pursuit Women's points race Women's 500 m time trial
2000	29–31 August	Amsterdam		Men's sprint Men's individual pursuit Men's points race Men's keirin Men's 1 km time trial Men's madison Men's omnium	Women's sprint Women's individual pursuit Women's points race Women's 500 m time trial
2001				Men's sprint Men's individual pursuit Men's points race Men's keirin Men's 1 km time trial	Women's sprint Women's individual pursuit Women's points race Women's 500 m time trial
2002	-8- December			Men's sprint Men's individual pursuit Men's points race Men's keirin Men's 1 km time trial	Women's sprint Women's individual pursuit Women's points race Women's 500 m time trial
2003	15 November			Men's scratch	Women's scratch
2003	13 December	Alkmaar	Sportpaleis Alkmaar	Men's madison	
2003	December	Amsterdam		Men's sprint Men's individual pursuit Men's points race Men's keirin Men's 1 km time trial	Women's sprint Women's individual pursuit Women's points race Women's keirin Women's 500 m time trial
2004	1–2 October	Alkmaar	Sportpaleis Alkmaar	Men's sprint Men's individual pursuit Men's points race Men's scratch Men's keirin Men's 1 km time trial	Women's sprint Women's individual pursuit Women's points race Women's scratch Women's keirin Women's 500 m time trial
2004	21 November			Men's madison	
2005	16–18 December	Amsterdam		Men's sprint Men's individual pursuit Men's points race Men's scratch Men's keirin Men's 1 km time trial	Women's sprint Women's individual pursuit Women's points race Women's scratch Women's keirin Women's 500 m time trial
2006	28–30 December	Alkmaar	Sportpaleis Alkmaar	Men's sprint Men's individual pursuit Men's points race Men's scratch Men's keirin Men's 1 km time trial Men's madison	Women's sprint Women's individual pursuit Women's points race Women's scratch Women's keirin Women's 500 m time trial
2007	27–30 December	Alkmaar	Sportpaleis Alkmaar	Men's sprint Men's individual pursuit Men's points race Men's scratch Men's keirin Men's 1 km time trial Men's madison	Women's sprint Women's individual pursuit Women's points race Women's scratch Women's keirin Women's 500 m time trial
2008	27–30 December	Apeldoorn	Omnisport Apeldoorn	Men's sprint Men's individual pursuit Men's points race Men's scratch Men's keirin Men's 1 km time trial Men's madison	Women's sprint Women's individual pursuit Women's points race Women's scratch Women's keirin Women's 500 m time trial
2009	9–11 October	Alkmaar	Sportpaleis Alkmaar	Men's individual pursuit Men's points race Men's scratch Men's madison	Women's individual pursuit Women's points race Women's scratch Women's madison
2009	28–30 December	Apeldoorn	Omnisport Apeldoorn	Men's sprint Men's keirin Men's 1 km time trial	Women's sprint Women's keirin Women's 500 m time trial
2010	7 February	Alkmaar	Sportpaleis Alkmaar	Men's omnium	Women's omnium
2010	16 October	Alkmaar	Sportpaleis Alkmaar	Men's madison	Women's madison
2010	28–30 December	Apeldoorn	Omnisport Apeldoorn	Men's sprint Men's individual pursuit Men's points race Men's scratch Men's keirin Men's 1 km time trial	Women's sprint Women's individual pursuit Women's points race Women's scratch Women's keirin Women's 500 m time trial
2011	5–6 March	Alkmaar	Sportpaleis Alkmaar	Men's omnium	Women's omnium
2011	27–30 December	Apeldoorn	Omnisport Apeldoorn	Men's sprint Men's individual pursuit Men's points race Men's scratch Men's keirin Men's 1 km time trial Men's madison	Women's sprint Women's individual pursuit Women's points race Women's scratch Women's keirin Women's 500 m time trial Women's madison
2012	28–29 January	Alkmaar	Sportpaleis Alkmaar	Men's omnium	Women's omnium
2012	27–30 December	Apeldoorn	Omnisport Apeldoorn	Men's sprint Men's individual pursuit Men's points race Men's scratch Men's keirin Men's 1 km time trial Men's madison	Women's sprint Women's individual pursuit Women's points race Women's scratch Women's keirin Women's 500 m time trial Women's madison
2013					
2014					
2015	20, 28–29 December	Alkmaar			
2016					
2017	20, 27–29 December	Alkmaar	Sportpaleis Alkmaar		
