= 2010 Dutch National Track Championships – Women's individual pursuit =

Women's individual pursuit
2010 Dutch National Track Championships

Race details
- Dates: 29 December 2010
- Stages: 1
- Distance: 3 km (1.864 mi)
- Winning time: 3:41.854

Medalists
	Gold	Ellen van Dijk
	Silver	Kirsten Wild
	Bronze	Vera Koedooder

The women's individual pursuit at the 2010 Dutch National Track Championships in Apeldoorn took place at Omnisport Apeldoorn on December 29, 2010. 14 athletes participated in the contest.

Ellen van Dijk won the gold medal, Kirsten Wild took silver and Vera Koedooder won the bronze.

== Preview ==
Ellen van Dijk, absent in 2009 but the national champion of 2007 and 2008 was one of the favourites for the title. The main rival of Van Dijk should be Kirsten Wild, the national champion of 2009.

== Competition format ==
The tournament started with a qualifying round. The two fastest qualifiers advanced to the gold medal final. The numbers three and four competed against each other for the bronze medal.

== Race ==
Kirsten Wild was the fastest in the qualification round with a time of 3:42.036, however Ellen van Dijk, number 2 in the qualification round, rode in the gold medal match more than a second faster (3:41.854 vs. 3:42.999), while Wild rode slower than in the qualification (3:43.233). Ellen van Dijk became so for the third time in her career the Dutch individual pursuit champion.

== Results ==
=== Qualification ===
Rank	Name	Time	Note
1	Kirsten Wild	3:42.036	Q
2	Ellen van Dijk	3:42.999	Q
3	Vera Koedooder	3:44.368	q
4	Amy Pieters	3:47.258	q
5	Annemiek van Vleuten	3:47.426	
6	Iris Slappendel	3:47.842	
7	Laura van der Kamp	3:51.706	
8	Chantal Blaak	3:52.369	
9	Winanda Spoor	3:53.723	
10	Mathilde Matthijsse	3:55.329	
11	Nathalie van Gogh	3:55.691	
12	Aafke Eshuis	4.00.770	
13	Ilona den Hartog	4.10.821	
14	Margo Klomp	4.17.395	

=== Finals ===
Bronze medal match

Name	Time	Rank
Vera Koedooder	3:44.516	3rd place, bronze medalist(s)
Amy Pieters	3:47.098	4

Gold medal match

Name	Time	Rank
Kirsten Wild	3:43.233	2nd place, silver medalist(s)
Ellen van Dijk	3:41.854	1st place, gold medalist(s)

=== Final results ===
Rank	Name	Time
1st place, gold medalist(s)	Ellen van Dijk	3:41.854
2nd place, silver medalist(s)	Kirsten Wild	3:43.233
3rd place, bronze medalist(s)	Vera Koedooder	3:44.516
4	Amy Pieters	3:47.098
5	Annemiek van Vleuten	3:47.426
6	Iris Slappendel	3:47.842
7	Laura van der Kamp	3:51.706
8	Chantal Blaak	3:52.369
9	Winanda Spoor	3:53.723
10	Mathilde Matthijsse	3:55.329
11	Nathalie van Gogh	3:55.691
12	Aafke Eshuis	4.00.770
13	Ilona den Hartog	4.10.821
14	Margo Klomp	4.17.395

Results from wielerpunt.com.
