= 2015 Vuelta a Andalucía =

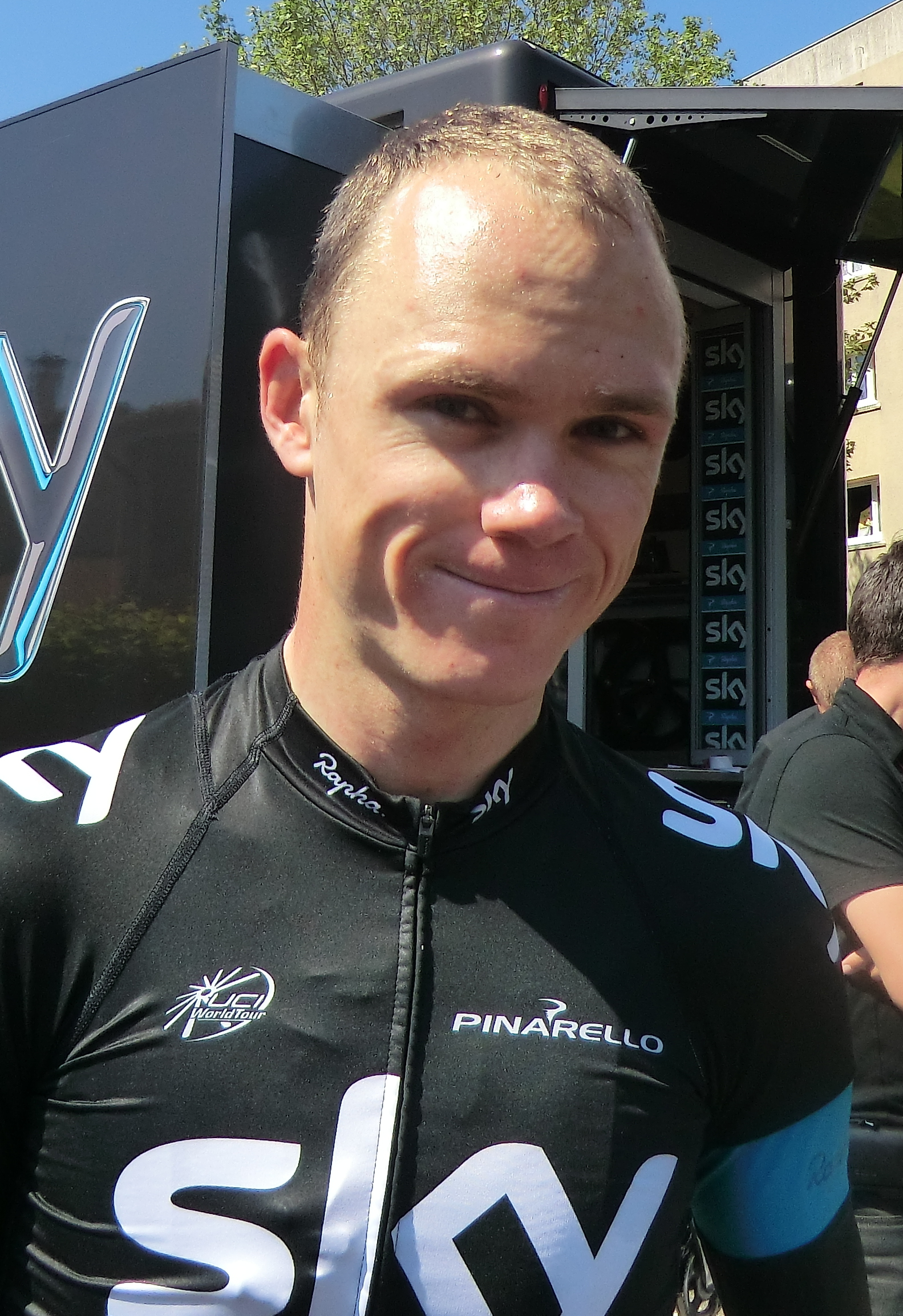
- Chris Froome, winner of the 2015 Vuelta a Andalucía

Race details
- Dates: 18–22 February 2015
- Stages: 6
- Distance: 854.3 km (530.8 mi)
- Winning time: 21h 21' 14"

Results
Jersey awarded to the overall winner	Winner	Chris Froome (GBR)	(Team Sky)
	Second	Alberto Contador (ESP)	(Tinkoff–Saxo)
	Third	Beñat Intxausti (ESP)	(Movistar Team)
Jersey awarded to the points classification winner	Points	Chris Froome (GBR)	(Team Sky)
Jersey awarded to the mountains classification winner	Mountains	Pello Bilbao (ESP)	(Caja Rural–Seguros RGA)
Jersey awarded to the sprints classification winner	Sprints	Simon Geschke (GER)	(Team Giant–Alpecin)
	Team	Team Sky	

The 2015 Vuelta a Andalucía (also known as the Ruta del Sol) was the 61st running of the Vuelta a Andalucía cycling stage race. It was rated as a 2.1 event on the 2015 UCI Europe Tour and was held from 18 to 22 February 2015, in the Andalusia region of southern Spain. Although the race lasted five days, there were six stages, with the first day split between two stages.

The previous three editions of the Vuelta a Andalucía had been won by Alejandro Valverde (Movistar Team), but he chose to begin his season at the 2015 Tour of Oman instead. Chris Froome (Team Sky) and Alberto Contador (Tinkoff–Saxo) both chose to begin their 2015 seasons in Andalusia. Nairo Quintana (Movistar Team) also intended to start his season at this race, but he pulled out following a crash.

The race was closely contested by Contador and Froome. Contador took the lead in the race after the split first stage, beating Froome by eight seconds in the individual time trial. He then increased his lead in the general classification by winning the summit finish on stage 3. Froome, however, won the second summit finish on stage 4 to take the lead of the race by a two-second margin. He was able to defend this lead to the end of the race, so winning his first stage race since the previous May. Froome also won the points classification, and his team won the team classification, with four of their riders in the top 10 overall. The mountains classification was won by Pello Bilbao (Caja Rural–Seguros RGA) on the final stage.

Three stages of the race were won by the Movistar Team, two of them for Juan José Lobato and one for Javier Moreno, with the remaining stage won by Pim Ligthart (Lotto–Soudal).

== Preview ==
The Vuelta a Andalucía was a traditional early season race. Many riders in the modern peloton, however, chose to start their seasons in the Middle East rather than in Europe (the 2015 Tour of Oman ran at the same time). In 2015, these included Alejandro Valverde (Movistar Team), who had won the Vuelta a Andalucía in 2012, 2013 and 2014, so he was not present to defend his title.

The Vuelta a Andalucía was particularly notable for its difficult, mountainous terrain. The 2015 edition, however, also featured an Individual time trial on the first day. The mountains were particularly difficult, with a summit finish at the Alto de Hazallanas on the third stage and another at Alto de Allanadas the following day. These three stages were seen as being the key to the general classification battle in the race.

The 2015 Vuelta a Andalucía was seen as the first 2015 meeting of several Grand Tour riders. In particular, it was considered to be a renewing of the rivalry between Chris Froome (Team Sky) and Alberto Contador (Tinkoff–Saxo), both of whom were starting their seasons in Andalusia. Their rivalry had been a notable feature of the 2014 cycling season, especially at the Critérium du Dauphiné and the Vuelta a España. For both riders, this race was preparation for other events in 2015. Froome was targeting his second victory in the Tour de France, while Contador was aiming at victory in both the Tour and the Giro d'Italia. Both riders were targeting victory in the race as a test of their form at the beginning of the season. While the riders were seen as being closely matched in the mountains, it was thought that Froome would have an advantage in the time trial.

Initially, Nairo Quintana (Movistar Team) had also intended to start the race at the beginning of his European season, in preparation for the Tour de France. However, following his participation in the Tour de San Luis, Quintana was involved in a crash at the Colombian National Road Race Championships and pulled out of the Vuelta a Andalucía in order to recuperate.

Other general classification contenders at the race included Jean-Christophe Péraud (AG2R La Mondiale), Bauke Mollema, Fränk Schleck (both Trek Factory Racing) and Jurgen Van den Broeck (Lotto–Soudal). The favourites for the three likely sprints included John Degenkolb (Team Giant–Alpecin) and Tyler Farrar (MTN–Qhubeka).

== Teams ==
22 teams were selected to take part in the 2015 event, including 10 UCI WorldTeams.

- Movistar Team
- Team Sky
- Caja Rural–Seguros RGA
- Tinkoff–Saxo
- Lotto–Soudal
- FDJ
- Team Giant–Alpecin
- AG2R La Mondiale
- Trek Factory Racing
- IAM Cycling
- LottoNL–Jumbo
- MTN–Qhubeka
- Wanty–Groupe Gobert
- Team Europcar
- Topsport Vlaanderen–Baloise
- RusVelo
- Team Roompot
- Cofidis
- UnitedHealthcare
- Colombia
- CCC–Sprandi–Polkowice
- Burgos BH

== Route ==
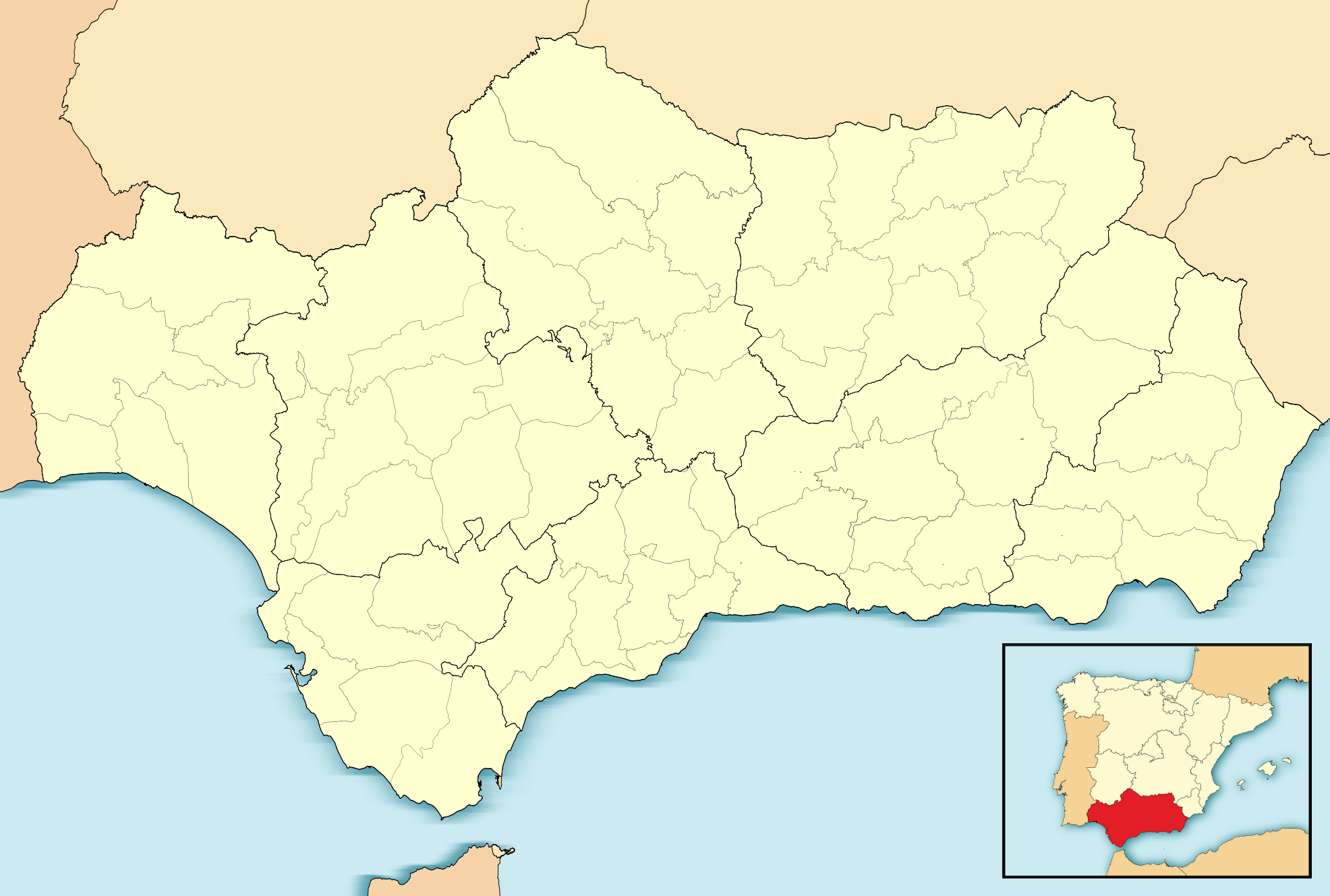
Locations of stage finishes in Andalusia

1	Stage 1a, La Rábida to Hinojos
2	Stage 1b, Coria del Río to Coria del Río
3	Stage 2, Utrera to Lucena
4	Stage 3, Motril to Alto de Hazallanas
5	Stage 4, Maracena to Alto de Allanadas
6	Stage 5, Montilla to Alhaurín de la Torre

List of stages
Stage	Date	Course	Distance	Type	Winner
1a	18 February	La Rábida to Hinojos	118.3 km (74 mi)	Hilly stage	Pim Ligthart (NED)
1b	18 February	Coria del Río to Coria del Río	8.2 km (5 mi)	Individual time trial	Javier Moreno (ESP)
2	19 February	Utrera to Lucena	194.7 km (121 mi)	Hilly stage	Juan José Lobato (ESP)
3	20 February	Motril to Alto de Hazallanas	159.8 km (99 mi)	Mountain stage	Alberto Contador (ESP)
4	21 February	Maracena to Alto de Allanadas	202.4 km (126 mi)	Mountain stage	Chris Froome (GBR)
5	22 February	Montilla to Alhaurín de la Torre	170.9 km (106 mi)	Hilly stage	Juan José Lobato (ESP)

== Stages ==
=== Stage 1a ===
18 February 2015 — La Rábida to Hinojos, 118.3 km (73.5 mi)

Stage 1 was split into two parts: a road stage in the morning and an individual time trial in the afternoon. The morning stage was held over a 118.3-kilometre (74-mile) route from La Rábida to Hinojos. The first part of the course was flat, but the last part was hillier, with the first classified climb of the race and a gradual incline to the finish.

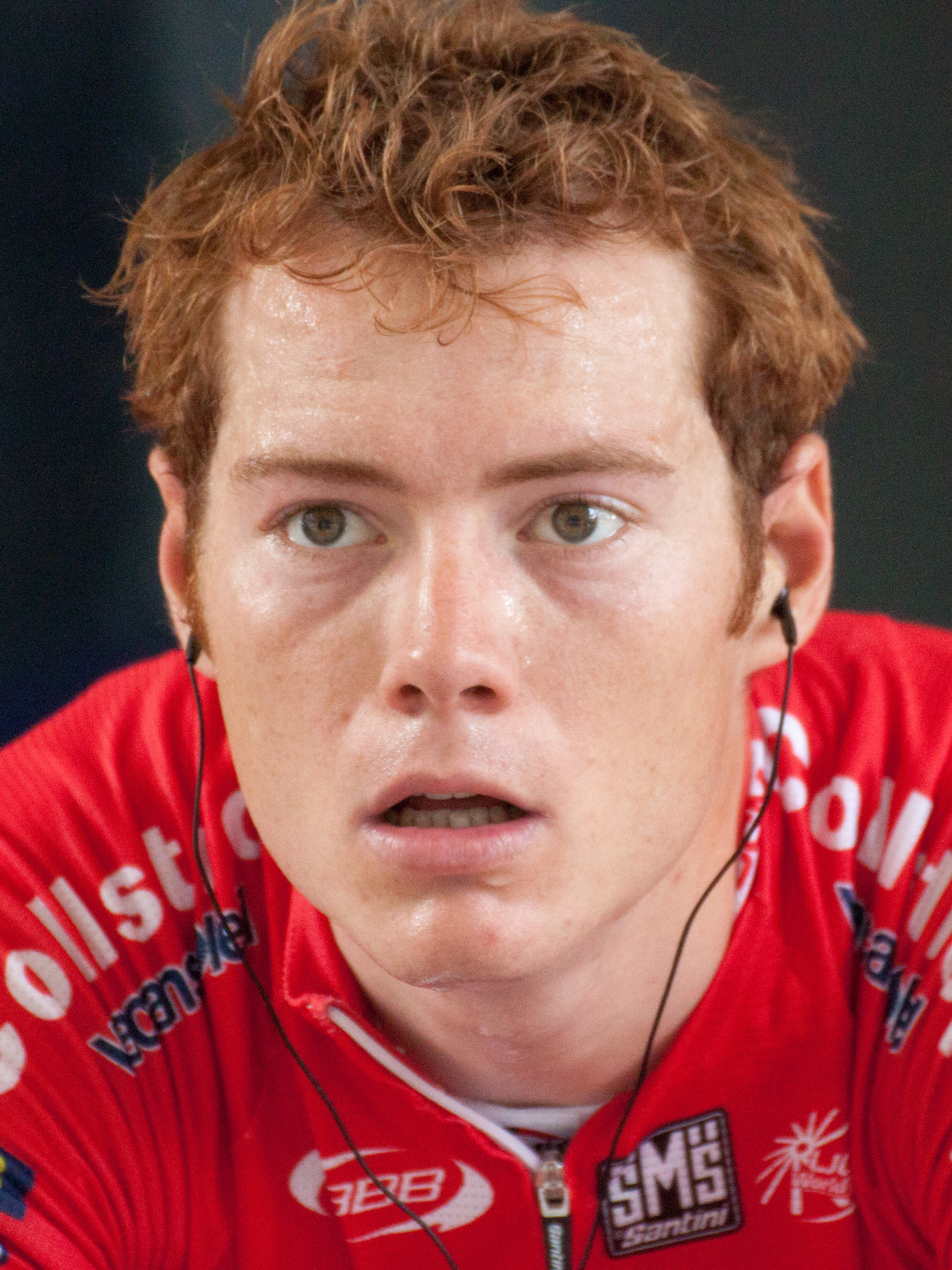
Pim Ligthart, winner of stage 1a

The early break was formed by Reinier Honig (Team Roompot), Christopher Jones (UnitedHealthcare), Ibai Salas (Burgos BH) and Aleksandr Komin (RusVelo). Their lead never exceeded four minutes, thanks to chasing efforts by the Movistar Team, and they were caught with approximately 40 km (25 mi) remaining. Sander Helven (Topsport Vlaanderen–Baloise) also put in an attack but was unable to escape from the pack.

Team Sky led the peloton across the categorised climb and intermediate sprint point, and it seemed likely that the stage would end in a sprint. Crashes, however, eliminated a large number of riders (including all but one of the Lotto–Soudal team) and split the peloton, so none of the sprinters' teams were able to control the conclusion of the race. Pim Ligthart (the one remaining rider from Lotto–Soudal) attacked with approximately 1.5 kilometres (0.93 miles) remaining and was able to hold off the chasing pack. Fábio Silvestre (Trek Factory Racing) and Grega Bole (CCC–Sprandi–Polkowice) finished second and third. Ligthart took the overall lead of the race and the points competition, while Team Sky took the lead in the mountains classification (with Kanstantsin Sivtsov), the intermediate sprints competition (with Peter Kennaugh) and the team classification.

Fränk Schleck (Trek Factory Racing) was among the riders affected by the crashes, suffering a muscular injury to his quadriceps, and was forced to abandon the race.

Stage 1a result and General classification after Stage 1a
Rank	Rider	Team	Time
1	Pim Ligthart (NED)	Lotto–Soudal	3h 01' 44"
2	Fábio Silvestre (POR)	Trek Factory Racing	+ 2"
3	Grega Bole (SLO)	CCC–Sprandi–Polkowice	+ 2"
4	Michael Van Staeyen (BEL)	Cofidis	+ 2"
5	Tyler Farrar (USA)	MTN–Qhubeka	+ 2"
6	Mirko Selvaggi (ITA)	Wanty–Groupe Gobert	+ 2"
7	Edward Theuns (BEL)	Topsport Vlaanderen–Baloise	+ 2"
8	Maciej Paterski (POL)	CCC–Sprandi–Polkowice	+ 2"
9	Daniele Ratto (ITA)	UnitedHealthcare	+ 2"
10	Sjoerd van Ginneken (NED)	Team Roompot	+ 2"

=== Stage 1b ===
18 February 2015 — Coria del Río to Coria del Río, 8.2 km (5.1 mi), individual time trial (ITT)

The afternoon stage was an 8.2-kilometre (5-mile) individual time trial in Coria del Río. Unusually for a time trial, the roads were in poor condition and were very dusty.

The stage was won by Javier Moreno (Movistar Team), with a time of 9' 51" – his first victory in an individual time trial. Wilco Kelderman (LottoNL–Jumbo) was two seconds back in second place and Jérôme Coppel (IAM Cycling) four seconds back in third. Pim Ligthart lost his race lead; Alberto Contador (Tinkoff–Saxo) took the red jersey with Bob Jungels (Trek Factory Racing) on the same time. Chris Froome (Team Sky) finished eight seconds behind Contador in what was the first significant meeting of the two favourites for the 2015 Tour de France.

Stage 1b result
Rank	Rider	Team	Time
1	Javier Moreno (ESP)	Movistar Team	9' 51"
2	Wilco Kelderman (NED)	LottoNL–Jumbo	+ 2"
3	Jérôme Coppel (FRA)	IAM Cycling	+ 4"
4	Alberto Contador (ESP)	Tinkoff–Saxo	+ 6"
5	Bob Jungels (LUX)	Trek Factory Racing	+ 6"
6	Beñat Intxausti (ESP)	Movistar Team	+ 7"
7	Gorka Izagirre (ESP)	Movistar Team	+ 11"
8	Jérôme Pineau (FRA)	IAM Cycling	+ 11"
9	Vasil Kiryienka (BLR)	Team Sky	+ 13"
10	Chris Froome (GBR)	Team Sky	+ 14"

General classification after Stage 1b
Rank	Rider	Team	Time
1	Alberto Contador (ESP)	Tinkoff–Saxo	3h 11' 43"
2	Bob Jungels (LUX)	Trek Factory Racing	+ 0"
3	Beñat Intxausti (ESP)	Movistar Team	+ 1"
4	Chris Froome (GBR)	Team Sky	+ 8"
5	Sylvain Chavanel (FRA)	IAM Cycling	+ 8"
6	Peter Kennaugh (GBR)	Team Sky	+ 12"
7	Ivan Basso (ITA)	Tinkoff–Saxo	+ 17"
8	Edward Theuns (BEL)	Topsport Vlaanderen–Baloise	+ 18"
9	John Degenkolb (GER)	Team Giant–Alpecin	+ 20"
10	Michael Valgren (DEN)	Tinkoff–Saxo	+ 20"

=== Stage 2 ===
19 February 2015 — Utrera to Lucena, 194.7 km (121.0 mi)

Stage 2 took the riders 194.7 kilometres (121.0 miles), from Utrera to Lucena. The first part of the course was flat, but it became increasingly hilly towards the end of the race. The one classified climb of the day came within the final 10 kilometres (6 miles), before the riders tackled an uphill section approaching the finish.

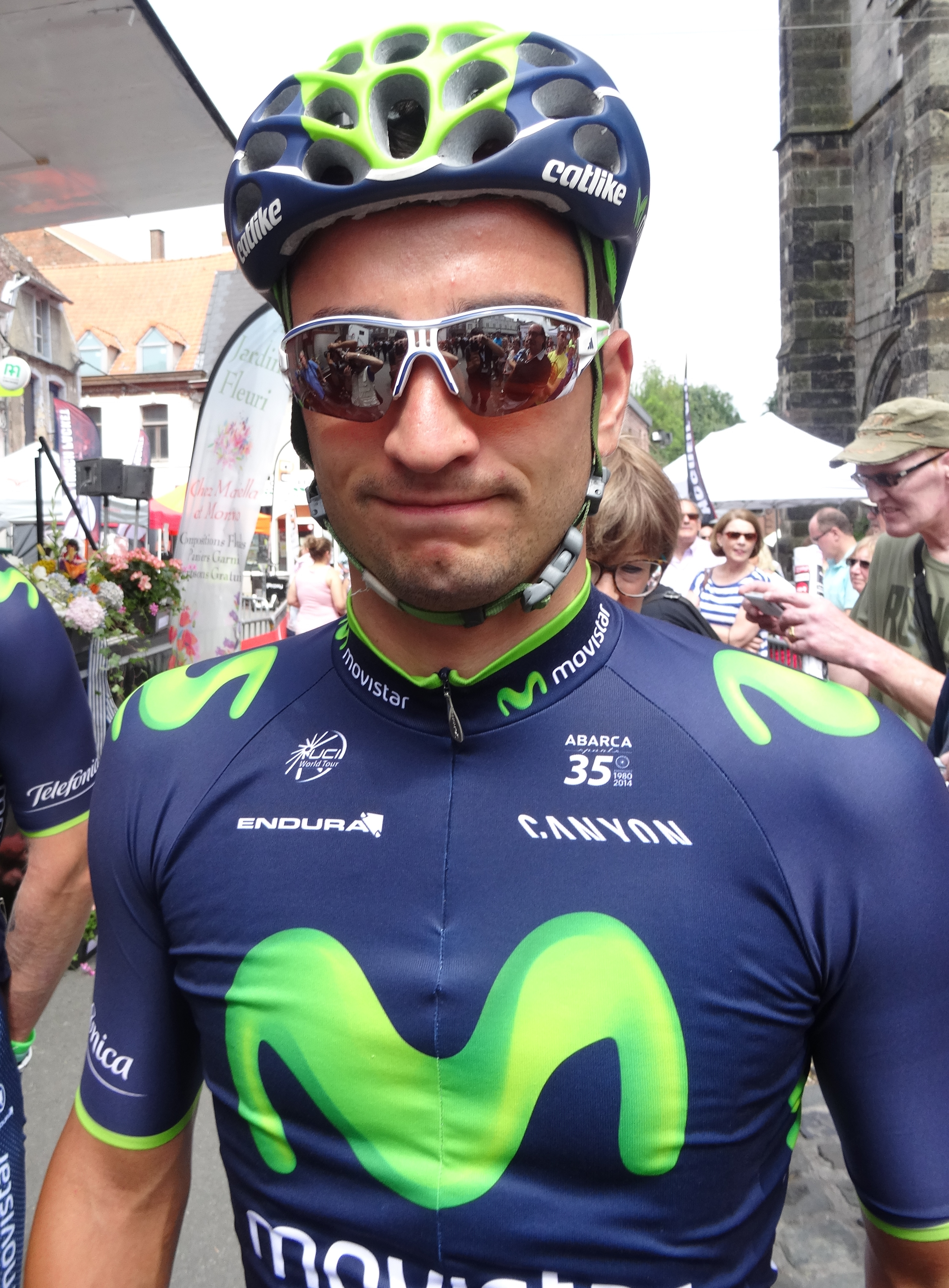
Juan José Lobato, winner of stage 2

There was a five-man breakaway early in the stage, formed of Nicolas Dougall (MTN–Qhubeka), Adrian Honkisz (CCC–Sprandi–Polkowice), Aleksandr Komin (RusVelo), Pirmin Lang (IAM Cycling) and Sjoerd van Ginneken (Team Roompot). They gained a lead of about five minutes, but were caught with 20 km (12 mi) remaining, before the beginning of the final climb.

There were further attacks on the climb, principally from Nicolas Edet (Cofidis), who won the mountains classification points at the summit. Carlos Quintero (Colombia), Mirko Selvaggi (Wanty–Groupe Gobert) and Peter Kennaugh (Team Sky) all attacked on the descent, but were controlled by the peloton. Race leader Alberto Contador (Tinkoff–Saxo) also attacked on the run to the finish, without success.

John Degenkolb was the favourite to win from the remaining group, but he was surprised by a sprint from 300 metres (980 feet) out by Juan José Lobato (Movistar Team). Degenkolb attempted to chase Lobato, but Lobato won by several bike lengths for his second win of 2015. Bob Jungels (Trek Factory Racing) was in second place before the stage, but could not follow the pace on the final climb and so dropped out of the top 10. Beñat Intxausti (Movistar Team) moved up to second, while Chris Froome (Team Sky) in third place was one of four Team Sky riders in the top 10.

Stage 2 result
Rank	Rider	Team	Time
1	Juan José Lobato (ESP)	Movistar Team	4h 51' 57"
2	John Degenkolb (GER)	Team Giant–Alpecin	+ 0"
3	Grega Bole (SLO)	CCC–Sprandi–Polkowice	+ 0"
4	Arthur Vichot (FRA)	FDJ	+ 0"
5	Eduard Prades (ESP)	Caja Rural–Seguros RGA	+ 0"
6	Daniele Ratto (ITA)	UnitedHealthcare	+ 0"
7	Pello Bilbao (ESP)	Caja Rural–Seguros RGA	+ 0"
8	Edward Theuns (BEL)	Topsport Vlaanderen–Baloise	+ 0"
9	Huub Duyn (NED)	Team Roompot	+ 0"
10	Oliver Naesen (BEL)	Topsport Vlaanderen–Baloise	+ 0"

General classification after Stage 2
Rank	Rider	Team	Time
1	Alberto Contador (ESP)	Tinkoff–Saxo	8h 03' 40"
2	Beñat Intxausti (ESP)	Movistar Team	+ 1"
3	Chris Froome (GBR)	Team Sky	+ 8"
4	Sylvain Chavanel (FRA)	IAM Cycling	+ 8"
5	Peter Kennaugh (GBR)	Team Sky	+ 12"
6	Ivan Basso (ITA)	Tinkoff–Saxo	+ 17"
7	Edward Theuns (BEL)	Topsport Vlaanderen–Baloise	+ 18"
8	John Degenkolb (GER)	Team Giant–Alpecin	+ 20"
9	Kanstantsin Sivtsov (BLR)	Team Sky	+ 21"
10	Mikel Nieve (ESP)	Team Sky	+ 28"

=== Stage 3 ===
20 February 2015 — Motril to Alto de Hazallanas, 159.8 km (99.3 mi)

Stage three was a 159.8-kilometre (99-mile) route from Motril to Alto de Hazallanas, the first summit finish of the race. It was regarded beforehand as the first major confrontation between Alberto Contador (Tinkoff–Saxo) and Chris Froome (Team Sky). There were two climbs in the first 95 kilometres (59 miles) of the stage, before a long flat section leading up to the final climb. The road got steeper with approximately 15 kilometres (9 miles) remaining, before the climb officially started with 8 kilometres (5 miles) to the finish line.

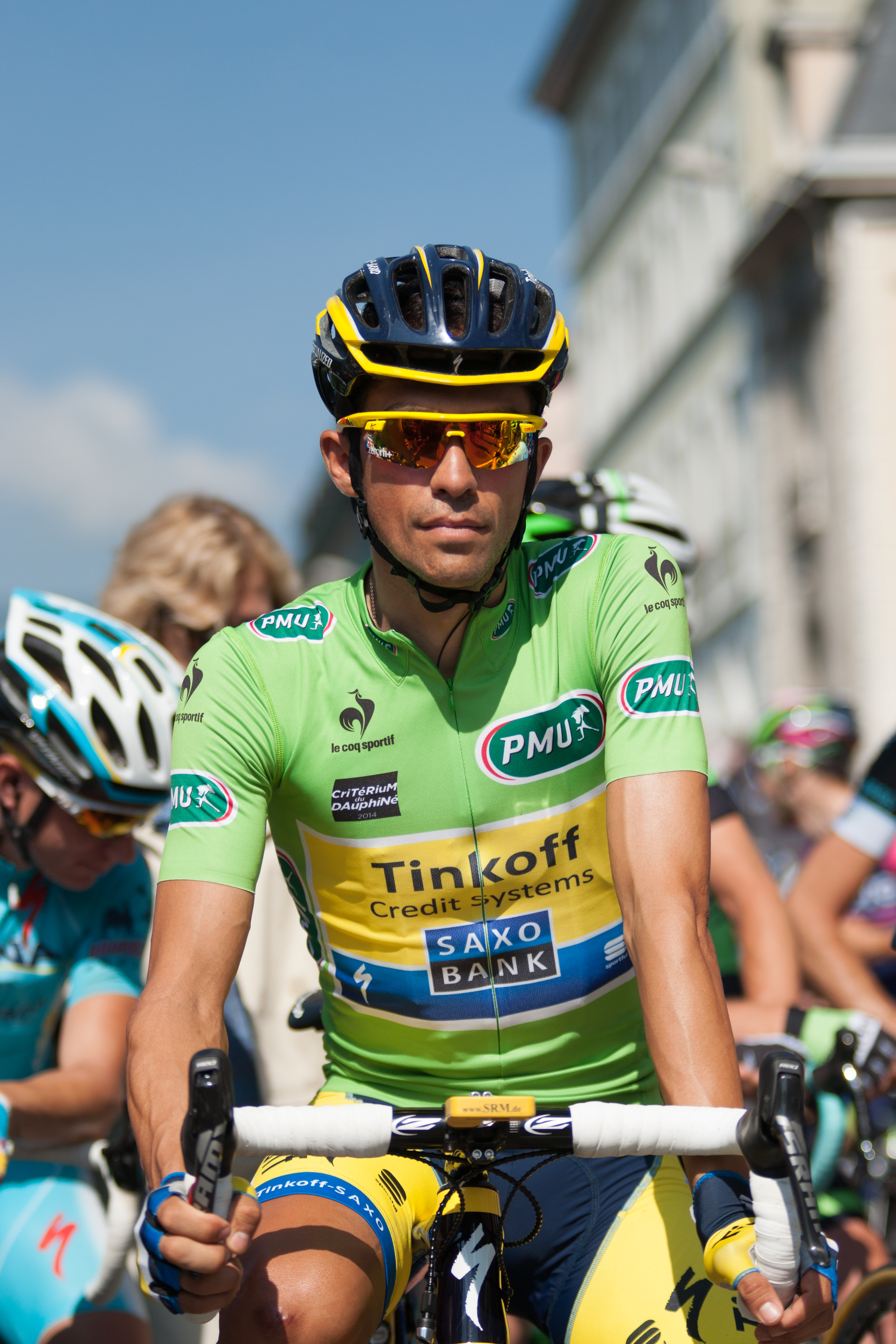
Alberto Contador, who won his first race of 2015 in stage 3

Tinkoff–Saxo controlled the peloton through most of the day and onto the early slopes of the final climb, reducing the group to 40 riders as they approached the most difficult part. Contador attacked in the early part of the climb, with support from his teammate Ivan Basso. At the moment of Contador's attack, the peloton was in confusion and Froome was not in the main chasing group. Basso and Contador rode away from the rest of the field. The main chase was led by Romain Bardet (AG2R La Mondiale), Peter Kennaugh (Team Sky), Beñat Intxausti (Movistar Team) and Daniel Navarro (Cofidis). After Contador had left Basso behind, he built a lead of 30 to 40 seconds over the group behind, riding without a power meter because of interference from the television motorcycles. Kennaugh was leading this group on behalf of Chris Froome, who had bridged over.

With four kilometres remaining, Froome set off alone in pursuit of Contador, repeating scenes from the 2014 Vuelta a España. Contador won the stage ahead of Froome, who had partially closed the gap, and was now just 19 seconds behind; Bardet was over a minute further back in third place. Contador therefore extended his overall lead to 27 seconds over Froome, still one of four Team Sky riders in the top ten. Contador and Froome, first and second now in general classification, had put significant time into all other competitors. Both leading riders declared themselves pleased with their performances early in the season. Contador was optimistic about retaining his overall lead to the end of the race, while Froome pointed to Contador's plans to ride the 2015 Giro d'Italia as a reason for his better form.

Stage 3 result
Rank	Rider	Team	Time
1	Alberto Contador (ESP)	Tinkoff–Saxo	4h 19' 15"
2	Chris Froome (GBR)	Team Sky	+ 19"
3	Romain Bardet (FRA)	AG2R La Mondiale	+ 1' 39"
4	Beñat Intxausti (ESP)	Movistar Team	+ 1' 58"
5	Mikel Nieve (ESP)	Team Sky	+ 2' 02"
6	Wilco Kelderman (NED)	LottoNL–Jumbo	+ 2' 05"
7	Merhawi Kudus (ERI)	MTN–Qhubeka	+ 2' 15"
8	Peter Kennaugh (GBR)	Team Sky	+ 2' 16"
9	Sébastien Reichenbach (SUI)	IAM Cycling	+ 2' 30"
10	Sergio Pardilla (ESP)	Caja Rural–Seguros RGA	+ 2' 42"

General classification after Stage 3
Rank	Rider	Team	Time
1	Alberto Contador (ESP)	Tinkoff–Saxo	12h 22' 55"
2	Chris Froome (GBR)	Team Sky	+ 27"
3	Beñat Intxausti (ESP)	Movistar Team	+ 1' 59"
4	Romain Bardet (FRA)	AG2R La Mondiale	+ 2' 13"
5	Peter Kennaugh (GBR)	Team Sky	+ 2' 28"
6	Mikel Nieve (ESP)	Team Sky	+ 2' 30"
7	Kanstantsin Sivtsov (BLR)	Team Sky	+ 3' 19"
8	Sylvain Chavanel (FRA)	IAM Cycling	+ 3' 41"
9	Nicolas Edet (FRA)	Cofidis	+ 4' 10"
10	Gorka Izagirre (ESP)	Movistar Team	+ 4' 15"

=== Stage 4 ===
21 February 2015 — Maracena to Alto de Allanadas, 202.4 km (125.8 mi)

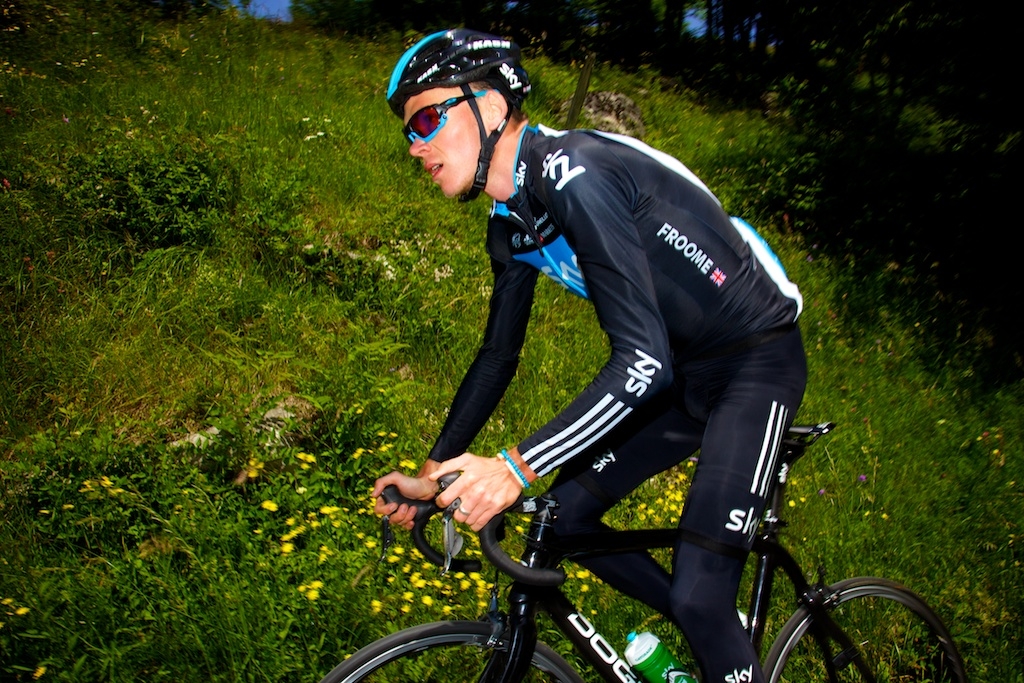
Chris Froome, who moved into the lead after victory in stage 4

Stage 4 was another summit finish, with the climb of Alto de Allanadas coming after 202.4 kilometres (126 miles) of racing. There were several small climbs before the steep 4.4-kilometre (2.7-mile) climb to the finish, that included sections of around 20% incline. The difficulty was increased by tricky weather conditions, including fog, rain and cold temperatures.

The early part of the stage featured a breakaway of five riders: Edward Theuns (Topsport Vlaanderen–Baloise), Romain Sicard (Team Europcar), Hugh Carthy (Caja Rural–Seguros RGA), Simon Geschke (Team Giant–Alpecin) and Mirko Selvaggi (Wanty–Groupe Gobert). With 10 kilometres (6 miles) remaining, only Geschke and Selvaggi were left. As Team Sky took up the chase at the foot of the climb, Selvaggi was on his own. Nicolas Roche Team Sky did a long spell riding on the front of the lead group on behalf of Froome; after this, their teammate Peter Kennaugh made a solo attack that brought Selvaggi back. Another Sky rider, Mikel Nieve, then put in a brief attack, before Froome attacked on one of the steepest parts of the climb. Contador was able to stay with Froome for the first 200 metres (656 feet) of his attack, but was then dropped.

Froome then rode solo to the end of the stage, using his power meter to judge his effort, and was able to ride away from Contador. Despite Contador's best efforts, the time gap increased. At the finish line, Froome was 29 seconds ahead of Contador, overturning his 27-second deficit from the start of the stage, thus moving into the overall lead of the race by two seconds. Froome took over the lead in both the overall and mountains classifications, while Contador retained his lead in the points competition.

Stage 4 result
Rank	Rider	Team	Time
1	Chris Froome (GBR)	Team Sky	5h 08' 54"
2	Alberto Contador (ESP)	Tinkoff–Saxo	+ 29"
3	Mikel Nieve (ESP)	Team Sky	+ 49"
4	Sylwester Szmyd (POL)	CCC–Sprandi–Polkowice	+ 59"
5	Beñat Intxausti (ESP)	Movistar Team	+ 1' 00"
6	Wilco Kelderman (NED)	LottoNL–Jumbo	+ 1' 13"
7	Sébastien Reichenbach (SUI)	IAM Cycling	+ 1' 26"
8	Romain Bardet (FRA)	AG2R La Mondiale	+ 1' 27"
9	Nicolas Edet (FRA)	Cofidis	+ 1' 27"
10	Jurgen Van den Broeck (BEL)	Lotto–Soudal	+ 1' 38"

General classification after Stage 4
Rank	Rider	Team	Time
1	Chris Froome (GBR)	Team Sky	17h 32' 16"
2	Alberto Contador (ESP)	Tinkoff–Saxo	+ 2"
3	Beñat Intxausti (ESP)	Movistar Team	+ 2' 32"
4	Mikel Nieve (ESP)	Team Sky	+ 2' 52"
5	Romain Bardet (FRA)	AG2R La Mondiale	+ 3' 13"
6	Peter Kennaugh (GBR)	Team Sky	+ 3' 50"
7	Kanstantsin Sivtsov (BLR)	Team Sky	+ 5' 07"
8	Nicolas Edet (FRA)	Cofidis	+ 5' 10"
9	Sylvain Chavanel (FRA)	IAM Cycling	+ 5' 30"
10	Sergio Pardilla (ESP)	Caja Rural–Seguros RGA	+ 5' 44"

=== Stage 5 ===
22 February 2015 — Montilla to Alhaurín de la Torre, 170.9 km (106.2 mi)

The final stage of the race was a 170.9-kilometre (106.2-mile) route from Montilla to Alhaurín de la Torre. There was one classified climb on the route, which was fairly hilly throughout. The final part, however, was mostly flat or downhill until the last kilometre, which was uphill.

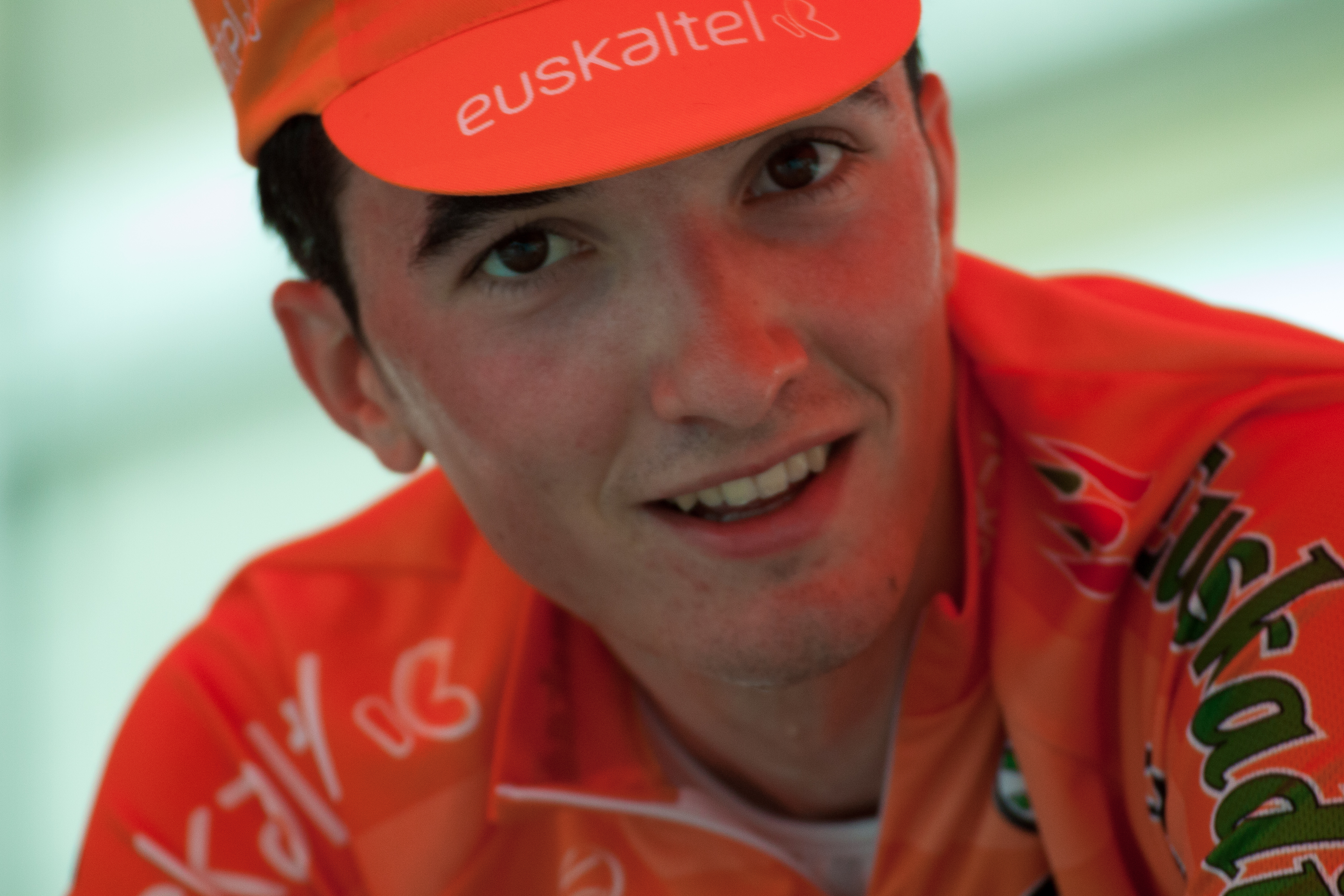
Pello Bilbao, who won the mountains classification with points on stage 5

The day's breakaway was formed by Johnny Hoogerland (Team Roompot), Pello Bilbao (Caja Rural–Seguros RGA), Songezo Jim, Merhawi Kudus (both MTN–Qhubeka), Rodolfo Torres (Colombia), Maciej Paterski (CCC–Sprandi–Polkowice) and Víctor Martín (Burgos BH). They were unable to form a large advantage, as Movistar Team and Team Giant–Alpecin controlled the race on behalf of Juan José Lobato and John Degenkolb respectively. 7 kilometres (4 miles) from the end of the stage, Paterski was the last rider to be caught by the peloton, then led by Tinkoff–Saxo. With 1.2 kilometres (0.7 miles) remaining, Edward Theuns (Topsport Vlaanderen–Baloise) attacked and was able to form a gap back to the peloton, but he was unable to hold on to win the stage. Lobato attacked from the peloton, with Degenkolb following, and was able to take a clear victory. Degenkolb was a second back, with Sylvain Chavanel (IAM Cycling) leading the peloton across the finishing line a further second behind.

Froome and Contador were both towards the front of the peloton in the finale: Contador was prepared to attack if possible, but the climb was not hard enough to allow him to form an advantage. Froome finished sixth on the stage, with Contador on the same time in ninth, so the general classification was unchanged. Froome lost his mountains leadership to Bilbao, who won the sprint at the only climb of the day. Froome, however, did win the points classification by one point ahead of Contador.

Stage 5 result
Rank	Rider	Team	Time
1	Juan José Lobato (ESP)	Movistar Team	3h 48' 56"
2	John Degenkolb (GER)	Team Giant–Alpecin	+ 1"
3	Sylvain Chavanel (FRA)	IAM Cycling	+ 2"
4	Pim Ligthart (NED)	Lotto–Soudal	+ 2"
5	Grega Bole (SLO)	CCC–Sprandi–Polkowice	+ 2"
6	Chris Froome (GBR)	Team Sky	+ 2"
7	Moreno Hofland (NED)	LottoNL–Jumbo	+ 2"
8	Jan Bakelants (BEL)	AG2R La Mondiale	+ 2"
9	Alberto Contador (ESP)	Tinkoff–Saxo	+ 2"
10	Nicolas Edet (FRA)	Cofidis	+ 2"

Final general classification
Rank	Rider	Team	Time
1	Chris Froome (GBR)	Team Sky	21h 21' 14"
2	Alberto Contador (ESP)	Tinkoff–Saxo	+ 2"
3	Beñat Intxausti (ESP)	Movistar Team	+ 2' 38"
4	Mikel Nieve (ESP)	Team Sky	+ 3' 05"
5	Romain Bardet (FRA)	AG2R La Mondiale	+ 3' 13"
6	Peter Kennaugh (GBR)	Team Sky	+ 4' 03"
7	Nicolas Edet (FRA)	Cofidis	+ 5' 10"
8	Kanstantsin Sivtsov (BLR)	Team Sky	+ 5' 17"
9	Sylvain Chavanel (FRA)	IAM Cycling	+ 5' 30"
10	Bob Jungels (LUX)	Trek Factory Racing	+ 5' 50"

== Classification leadership table ==
There were four major classifications in the 2015 Vuelta a Andalucía.

The first and most important classification was the general classification. This was calculated by adding together the times of each rider cumulatively across the six stages. There were no bonus seconds awarded. If two riders were tied on the same time, they would be differentiated by the precise time recorded in the individual time trial. The leader of the competition after each stage was awarded a red jersey; the leader of the general classification after the final stage was considered the winner of the race.

The second classification was the points classification. After each stage or split stage, the top 15 riders were awarded a number of points (25 for the stage winner, 20 for the rider in second place, down to 1 point for the rider in 15th place). The rider with the most points at the end of the race was the winner of the classification. The points leader wore a blue jersey.

The mountains classification was determined by points won at the categorised climbs on the route. There were three categories of climbs: the most difficult climbs won ten points for the first rider to the summit; the winners of second category climbs won six; the winners of third category climbs won three. The rider with the most points was the mountains winner and won the green jersey.

There was also an intermediate sprints classification. At each individual sprint, there were points awarded for the first, second and third riders across the line (3, 2 and 1 points respectively). The rider with the most points gained at these intermediate sprints was the winner of the sprints classification, which earned him the white jersey.

The teams classification was calculated by taking the best three riders on each team on each stage and adding their times together. The team with the lowest cumulative time was the winner of the classification.

There were also three minor prizes awarded after the final stage. There were trophies to the best Spanish rider and the best Andalusian rider in the general classification. Finally, here was a trophy for the winner of the combination classification. This was calculated by adding up each rider's position in the general, points and mountains classification. The rider with the lowest number won.

Stage	Winner	General classification	Mountains classification	Sprints classification	Points classification	Teams classification
1a	Pim Ligthart	Pim Ligthart	Kanstantsin Sivtsov	Peter Kennaugh	Pim Ligthart	Team Sky
1b	Javier Moreno	Alberto Contador	Kanstantsin Sivtsov	Peter Kennaugh	Pim Ligthart	Team Sky
2	Juan José Lobato	Alberto Contador	Kanstantsin Sivtsov	Sjoerd van Ginneken	Grega Bole	Team Sky
3	Alberto Contador	Alberto Contador	Pello Bilbao	Pieter Jacobs	Alberto Contador	Team Sky
4	Chris Froome	Chris Froome	Chris Froome	Simon Geschke	Alberto Contador	Team Sky
5	Juan José Lobato	Chris Froome	Pello Bilbao	Simon Geschke	Chris Froome	Team Sky
Final		Chris Froome	Pello Bilbao	Simon Geschke	Chris Froome	Team Sky

=== Minor classifications ===
Classification	Winner	Team
Best Spanish rider	Alberto Contador	Tinkoff–Saxo
Best Andalusian rider	Luis Ángel Maté	Cofidis
Combination	Chris Froome	Team Sky
