= 2009 Dutch National Track Championships =

- Venue: Alkmaar (endurance)
- Date(s): October 9–11, 2009 (endurance); December 28–30, 2009 (sprint)
- Velodrome: Sportpaleis Alkmaar (endurance)

The 2009 Dutch National Track Championships were Dutch national Championship for track cycling. There were separate championships for endurance and sprint disciplines. The endurance disciplines (individual pursuit, scratch race, points race and madison) took place at Sportpaleis Alkmaar in Alkmaar, the Netherlands from October 9 to October 11. The sprint disciplines (sprint, time trial and keirin) took place from December 28 to December 30. Competitions were held of various track cycling disciplines in different age, gender and disability categories.

== Medal summary ==
=== Elite ===
Event	Gold	Silver	Bronze
Men's Events
Men's sprint	Teun Mulder	Michael Vingerling	Patrick Bos
Men's 1 km time trial	Teun Mulder	Tim Veldt	Michael Vingerling
Men's keirin	Teun Mulder	Patrick Bos	Jelger Bisschop
Men's individual pursuit	Levi Heimans	Jeff Vermeulen	Tim Veldt
Men's scratch	Michael Vingerling	Pim Ligthart	Jeff Vermeulen
Men's points race	Arno van der Zwet	Peter Schep	Jeff Vermeulen
Men's madison	Michael Vingerling; Nick Stopler	Pim Ligthart; Jeff Vermeulen	Yoeri Havik; Barry Markus
Women's Events
Women's sprint	Willy Kanis	Yvonne Hijgenaar	Agnes Ronner
Women's 500 m time trial	Willy Kanis	Yvonne Hijgenaar	Agnes Ronner
Women's keirin	Willy Kanis	Agnes Ronner	Yvonne Hijgenaar
Women's individual pursuit	Kirsten Wild	Vera Koedooder	Amy Pieters
Women's scratch	Natalie van Gogh	Eva Heijmans	Adriene Snijder
Women's points race	Roxane Knetemann	Eva Heijmans	Kirsten Wild
Women's madison	Vera Koedooder; Kirsten Wild	Amy Pieters; Roxane Knetemann	Lotte van Hoek; Winanda Spoor
