= 2012 Dutch National Track Championships – Women's points race =

Women's points race
2012 Dutch National Track Championships

Race details
- Dates: 27 December 2012
- Stages: 1
- Distance: 25 km (15.53 mi)

Medalists
	Gold	Roxane Knetemann
	Silver	Kirsten Wild
	Bronze	Vera Koedooder

The women's points race at the 2012 Dutch National Track Championships in Apeldoorn took place at Omnisport Apeldoorn on December 27, 2012. 19 athletes participated in the contest.

== Competition format ==
There were no qualification rounds for this discipline. Consequently, the event was run direct to the final.

== Race ==
The race started at 19:35 and consisted on 100 laps, making a total of 25 km.

== Results ==
Rank	Name	Points	Arrival
1st place, gold medalist(s)	Roxane Knetemann	35	4
2nd place, silver medalist(s)	Kirsten Wild	34	1
3rd place, bronze medalist(s)	Vera Koedooder	34	9
4	Judith Bloem	29	8
5	Kelly Markus	14	3
6	Amy Pieters	11	2
7	Laura van der Kamp	5	6
8	Birgitta Roos	3	7
9	Lotte van Hoek	3	12
10	Nina Kessler	2	15
11	Natalie van Gogh	0	5
12	Bianca Lust	0	10
13	Samantha van Steenis	0	11
14	Daisy Rodenburg	0	13
15	Nicky Zijlaard	0	14
16	Kim van Dijk	0	16
17	Aafke Eshuis	0	17
18	Winanda Spoor	0	18
19	Rozanne Slik	0	19

Results from nkbaanwielrennen.nl
