= 2009 Dutch National Track Championships – Women's individual pursuit =

Women's individual pursuit
2009 Dutch National Track Championships

Race details
- Dates: 10 October 2009
- Stages: 1
- Distance: 3 km (1.864 mi)

Medalists
	Gold	Kirsten Wild
	Silver	Vera Koedooder
	Bronze	Amy Pieters

The women's individual pursuit at the 2009 Dutch National Track Championships in Alkmaar took place at Sportpaleis Alkmaar on October 10, 2009. 10 athletes participated in the contest.

Kirsten Wild won the gold medal, Vera Koedooder took silver and Amy Pieters won the bronze.

== Preview ==
Titleholder Ellen van Dijk took not part in this competition. Two weeks before the national championships she rode the time trial at the Road World Championships. Van Dijk wanted to take some rest in preparation for the qualification moment for the Track World Championships during the World Cup competitions in November.

== Competition format ==
The tournament started with a qualifying round. The two fastest qualifiers advanced to the gold medal final. The numbers three and four competed against each other for the bronze medal.

== Race ==
Kirsten Wild rode in the qualification round with 3:44 the fastest time, a second faster than the number two Vera Koedooder. In the gold medal match, Kirsten wild rode more than 2 seconds faster than Vera Koedooder.

== Final results ==
Rank	Name
1st place, gold medalist(s)	Kirsten Wild
2nd place, silver medalist(s)	Vera Koedooder
3rd place, bronze medalist(s)	Amy Pieters
4	Liesbeth Bakker
5	Nathalie Van Gogh
6	Agnieta Francke
7	Marieke van Nek
8	Winanda Spoor
9	Lotte van Hoek
10	Roxane Knetemann

Results from uci.ch
