= Michael Vingerling =

Dutch cyclist

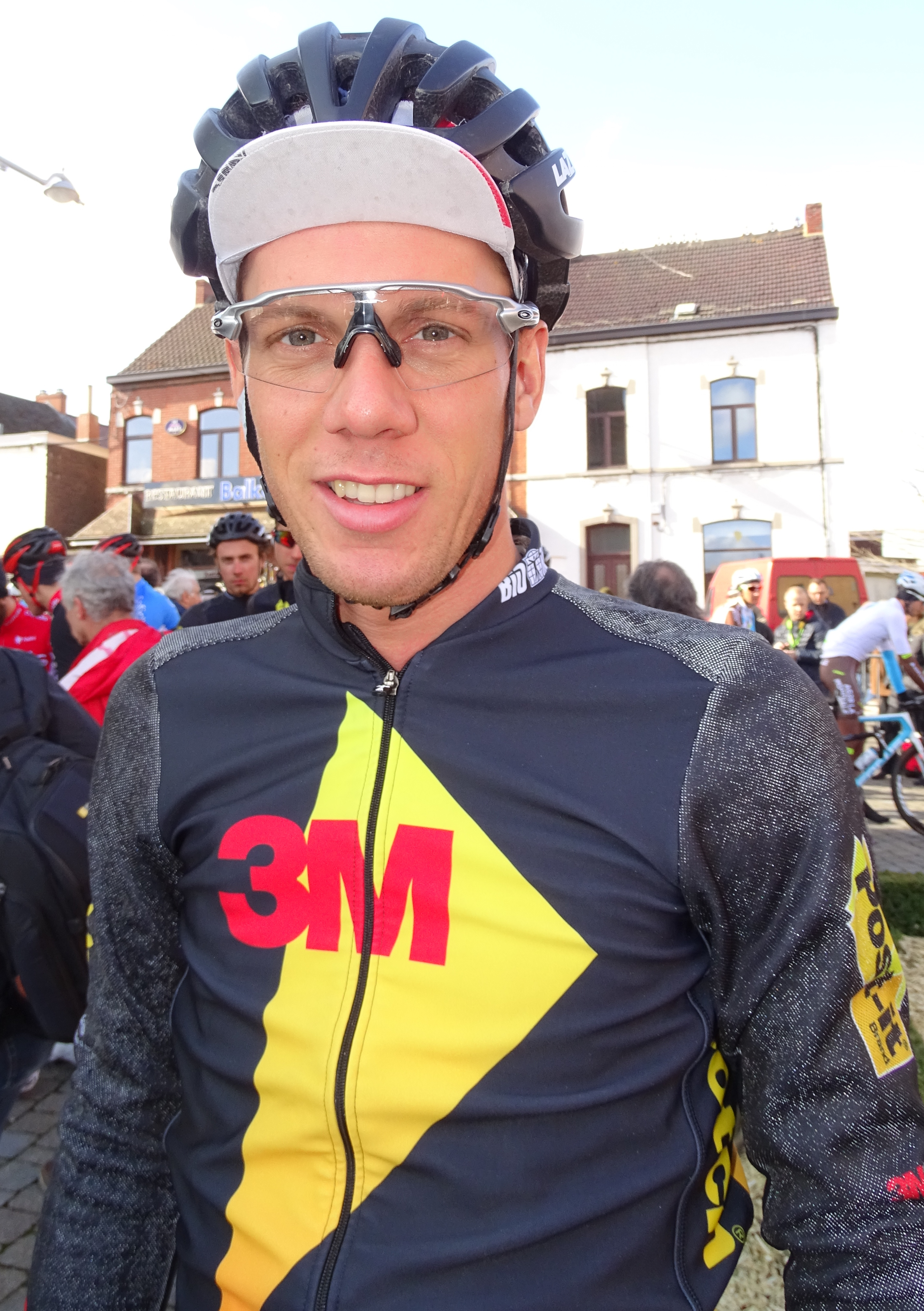
- Vingerling in 2016.

Personal information
- Full name: Michael Vingerling
- Born: 28 June 1990 (age 36) Dirksland, Netherlands
- Height: 1.84 m (6 ft 0 in)
- Weight: 75 kg (165 lb)

Cycling career
- Sport: Cycling
- Current team: WASp
- Disciplines: Road; Track
- Role: Rider

Amateur teams
- 2017: Vlasman
- 2018–: WASp

Professional teams
- 2009–2012: Koga–CreditForce
- 2013–2016: Team3M

Michael Vingerling (born 28 June 1990 in Dirksland) is a Dutch track and road cyclist.

== Major results ==
2006
National Junior Track Championships

1st Keirin
1st Madison (with Nick Stöpler)
1st Sprint

2007
1st Scratch, UEC European Junior Track Championships
National Junior Track Championships

1st Individual pursuit
1st Kilo
1st Madison (with Nick Stöpler)
1st Points race
1st Scratch
1st Sprint

1st Road race, National Junior Road Championships
2008
1st Scratch, UCI Junior Track World Championships
2nd Madison, National Track Championships (with Nick Stöpler)
2nd Omloop Het Volk Juniors
2009
National Track Championships

1st Madison (with Nick Stöpler)
1st Scratch
2nd Sprint
3rd Kilo

2010
1st Omnium, National Track Championships
2011
3rd Individual pursuit, National Track Championships
2012
National Track Championships

1st Omnium
2nd Madison (with Dylan van Baarle)

2013
2nd Baronie Breda Classic
4th Zuid Oost Drenthe Classic I
2014
1st Scratch, National Track Championships
2nd Arnhem–Veenendaal Classic
2015
1st Sprints classification Three Days of De Panne
3rd Madison, National Track Championships (with Melvin van Zijl)

== See also ==
- List of Dutch Olympic cyclists
