= 2010 Dutch National Omnium Championships =

- Venue: Sportpaleis Alkmaar
- Dates: February 7, 2010
- Competitors: 21 men 14 women

Medalist men
1st place, gold medalist(s)		Michael Vingerling
2nd place, silver medalist(s)		Sipke Zijlstra
3rd place, bronze medalist(s)		Arno van der Zwet

Medalist women
1st place, gold medalist(s)		Vera Koedooder
2nd place, silver medalist(s)		Ellen van Dijk
3rd place, bronze medalist(s)		Yvonne Hijgenaar

The 2010 Dutch National Omnium Championships were the Dutch national track cycling Championships for the omnium discipline. The competitions took place at Sportpaleis Alkmaar in Alkmaar, the Netherlands on February 7, 2010.

== Competition format ==
The competition consisted both for men and women of five events, with a point-for-place system.

- Flying lap: an individual time trial over 200 m (656.2 ft) with a "flying start".
- Points race: a points race, with scoring for intermediate sprints as well as for lapping the pack.
- Individual pursuit: a 2 km (1.2 mi) for women and 3 km (1.9 mi) for women individual pursuit, with placing based on time.
- Scratch race: a 10 km (6.2 mi) scratch race, with all riders competing at once and first across the line winning.
- Time trial: a 500 m (1,640.4 ft) for women and 1 km (0.6 mi) time trial, with two riders (starting opposite the track) riding at once.

== Women's Results ==
=== 200 m ===
Rank	Name	Time	YouTube video
1	Yvonne Hijgenaar	11.797	
2	Agnes Ronner	11.902	See
3	Vera Koedooder	12.543	
4	Ellen van Dijk	12.680	See
5	Natalie van Gogh	12.688	
6	Amy Pieters	12.918	See
7	Esra Tromp	13.391	See
8	Ilona Meiring	13.551	See
9	Marieke van Nek	13.648	
10	Nina kessler	14.000	
11	Eva Heijmans	14.184	See
12	Julia Soek	14.254	
13	Joan Boskamp	14.402	
14	Dewi Asselman	15.316	See

=== Scratch ===
Rank	Name
1	Eva Heijmans
2	Vera Koedooder
3	Amy Pieters
4	Ellen van Dijk
5	Agnes Ronner
6	Yvonne Hijgenaar
7	Natalie van Gogh
8	Ilona Meiring
9	Joan Boskamp
10	Julia Soek
11	Esra Tromp
12	Marieke van Nek
13	Nina kessler
14	Dewi Asselman

=== 2 km individual pursuit ===
Rank	Name	Time
1	Ellen van Dijk	2.28.145
2	Vera Koedooder	2.29.527
3	Amy Pieters	2.30.949
4	Natalie van Gogh	2.31.941
5	Yvonne Hijgenaar	2.32.695
6	Eva Heijmans	2.38.820
7	Ilona Meiring	2.40.965
8	Esra Tromp	2.43.781
9	Marieke van Nek	2.44.164
10	Joan Boskamp	2.44.391
11	Agnes Ronner	2.44.832
12	Nina kessler	2.47.789
13	Julia Soek	2.52.836
14	Dewi Asselman	2.58.211

=== Points race ===
Rank	Name	Points	Bonus	Sprint 1	Sprint 2	Sprint 3	Sprint 4
1	Ilona Meiring	21	20			1	
2	Vera Koedooder	20		5	5	5	5
3	Amy Pieters	9		1	3	3	2
4	Ellen van Dijk	7		2	2		3
5	Natalie van Gogh	7		3	1	2	1
6	Yvonne Hijgenaar	0					
7	Joan Boskamp	0					
8	Eva Heijmans	0					
9	Julia Soek	0					
10	Nina kessler	0					
11	Agnes Ronner	0					
12	Marieke van Nek	0					
13	Esra Tromp	0					
14	Dewi Asselman	-99	-99				

=== 500 m time trial ===
Rank	Name	Time
1	Yvonne Hijgenaar	36.664
2	Agnes Ronner	37.438
3	Vera Koedooder	39.227
4	Natalie van Gogh	39.281
5	Amy Pieters	39.492
6	Ellen van Dijk	40.195
7	Ilona Meiring	41.227
8	Esra Tromp	41.352
9	Joan Boskamp	41.609
10	Nina kessler	42.031
11	Marieke van Nek	42.148
12	Eva Heijmans	42.492
13	Julia Soek	42.891
14	Dewi Asselman	46.195

=== Final results ===
Rank	Name	200 meter	Scratch race	Individual pursuit	Points race	500 m time trial	Points	Time
1	Vera Koedooder	3	2	2	2	3	12	
2	Ellen van Dijk	4	4	1	4	6	19	3:21.020
3	Yvonne Hijgenaar	1	6	5	6	1	19	3.21.156
4	Amy Pieters	6	3	3	3	5	20	
5	Natalie van Gogh	5	7	4	5	4	25	
6	Agnes Ronner	2	5	11	11	2	31	3:34.172
7	Ilona Meiring	8	8	7	1	7	31	3:35.743
8	Eva Heijmans	11	1	6	8	12	38	
9	Esra Tromp	7	11	8	13	8	47	
10	Joan Boskamp	13	9	10	7	9	48	
11	Marieke van Nek	9	12	9	12	11	53	
12	Nina kessler	10	13	12	10	10	55	
13	Julia Soek	12	10	13	9	13	57	
14	Dewi Asselman	14	14	14	14	14	70	

Results

== Men's results ==
Results
