= 2012 Dutch National Track Championships – Women's scratch =

Women's scratch
2011 Dutch National Track Championships

Race details
- Dates: 30 December 2011
- Stages: 1
- Distance: 10 km (6.214 mi)

Medalists
	Gold	Kirsten Wild
	Silver	Kelly Markus
	Bronze	Amy Pieters

The women's scratch at the 2012 Dutch National Track Championships in Apeldoorn took place at Omnisport Apeldoorn on December 30, 2011. 16 athletes participated in the contest.

== Competition format ==
Because of the number of entries, there were no qualification rounds for this discipline. Consequently, the event was run direct to the final. The race started at 18:00 and consisted on 40 laps, making a total of 10 km.

== Results ==
Rank	Name	Result
1st place, gold medalist(s)	Kirsten Wild	
2nd place, silver medalist(s)	Kelly Markus	
3rd place, bronze medalist(s)	Amy Pieters	
4	Natalie van Gogh	
5	Vera koedooder	
6	Roxane Knetemann	
–	Kim van Dijk	DNF
–	Aafke Eshuis	DNF
–	Lotte van Hoek	DNF
–	Laura van der Kamp	DNF
–	Nina Kessler	DNF
–	Daisy Rodenburg	DNF
–	Birgitta Roos	DNF
–	Winanda Spoor	DNF
–	Samantha van Steenis	DNF

DNF = Did not finish.
Results from nkbaanwielrennen.nl
