= Pim Ligthart =

Dutch road cyclist

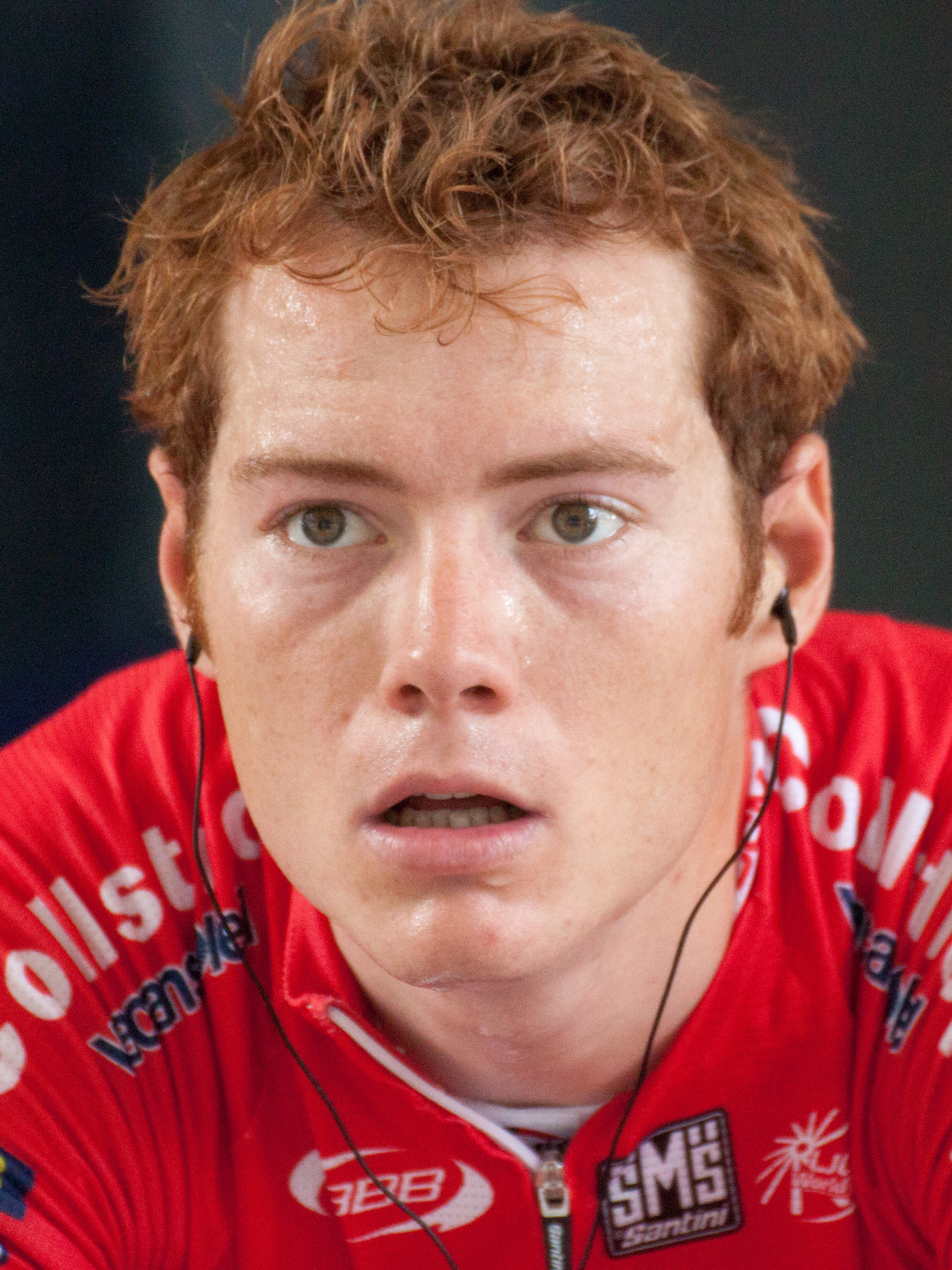
- Ligthart at the 2012 Critérium du Dauphiné

Personal information
- Full name: Pim Ligthart
- Born: 16 June 1988 (age 38) Hoorn, the Netherlands
- Height: 1.81 m (5 ft 11 in)
- Weight: 72 kg (159 lb)

Cycling career
- Sport: Cycling
- Discipline: Road
- Role: Rider

Amateur teams
- 2009–2010: AVC Aix-en-Provence
- 2010: Vacansoleil (stagiaire)

Professional teams
- 2007–2008: KrolStonE Continental Team
- 2011–2013: Vacansoleil–DCM
- 2014–2016: Lotto–Belisol
- 2017–2018: Roompot–Nederlandse Loterij
- 2019–2020: Direct Énergie

Major wins
- One-day races and Classics National Road Race Championships (2011) Ronde van Drenthe (2019)

Pim Ligthart (born 16 June 1988, in Hoorn) is a Dutch former professional road bicycle racer, who rode professionally between 2007 and 2008, and also 2011 to 2020, for the KrolStonE Continental Team, Vacansoleil–DCM, Lotto–Soudal, Roompot–Nederlandse Loterij and Total Direct Énergie teams.

== Major results ==
=== Track ===
2004
2nd Individual pursuit, National Novice Championships
2005
National Junior Championships

2nd Scratch race
3rd Points race
3rd Individual pursuit

2006
National Championships

1st Points race
1st Scratch race
2nd Madison (with Jeff Vermeulen)

2nd Madison, UCI Junior World Championships
2007
National Championships

1st Points race
2nd Scratch race
3rd Madison (with Jeff Vermeulen)

1st Omnium, National Under-23 Championships
UEC European Under-23 Championships

2nd Points race
2nd Madison

3rd Overall UIV Cup

1st Munich

2008
1st Points race, 2007–08 UCI Track Cycling World Cup Classics, Copenhagen
UEC European Under-23 Championships

2nd Scratch
2nd Madison

2009
National Championships

2nd Madison (with Jeff Vermeulen)
2nd Scratch race

2nd Six Days of Tilburg
3rd Madison (with Peter Schep), 2008–09 UCI Track Cycling World Cup Classics, Copenhagen
2011
2nd Six Days of Rotterdam (with Robert Bartko)
2012
1st Six Days of Amsterdam (with Michael Mørkøv)
2015
1st Scratch, National Championships

=== Road ===
2006
2nd Overall Kroz Istru

1st Stage 2

2nd Omloop der Vlaamse Gewesten
2007
1st Hel van Voerendaal
2008
1st Intexstore Race Venhuizen
2009
1st Stage 2 Tour de Moselle
3rd Circuit des 2 Provinces
5th Grand Prix des Marbriers
2010
2nd ZLM Tour
3rd La Côte Picarde
3rd Boucles Catalanes
6th Arno Wallaard Memorial
2011
1st Road race, National Road Championships
1st Hel van het Mergelland
3rd Clásica de Almería
5th Overall Tour of Belgium

1st Young rider classification

8th Grote Prijs Beeckman-De Caluwé
2012
3rd Overall Tour de Wallonie
6th Clásica de Almería
7th Hel van het Mergelland
2013
1st Stage 5 Ster ZLM Toer
5th Volta Limburg Classic
10th Clásica de Almería
2014
1st Mountains classification Paris–Nice
9th Overall Tour de Wallonie
Vuelta a España

Combativity award Stages 5, 6 & 19

2015
1st Grand Prix La Marseillaise
1st Stage 1a Vuelta a Andalucia
1st Mountains classification Danmark Rundt
2nd Binche–Chimay–Binche
10th Overall Étoile de Bessèges
10th Paris–Tours
2016
2nd Grote Prijs Jef Scherens
4th Cadel Evans Great Ocean Road Race
2017
5th Eschborn–Frankfurt – Rund um den Finanzplatz
8th Overall Three Days of De Panne
9th Overall Four Days of Dunkirk
2018
3rd Overall Tour des Fjords
4th Kuurne–Brussels–Kuurne
5th Trofeo Lloseta–Andratx
9th Trofeo Serra de Tramuntana
2019
1st Ronde van Drenthe

==== Grand Tour general classification results timeline ====
Grand Tour	2011	2012	2013	2014	2015	2016	2017	2018	2019	2020
Giro d'Italia	—	—	161	—	—	126	—	—	—	—
Tour de France	Did not contest during career									
Vuelta a España	108	126	—	127	—	—	—	—	—	DNF

Legend
—	Did not compete
DNF	Did not finish

== See also ==
- List of Dutch Olympic cyclists

Sporting positions
Preceded by Niki Terpstra	Dutch National Road Race Championships; Winner; 2011	Succeeded by Niki Terpstra
