= 2006 Dutch National Track Championships – Women's 500 m time trial =

Women's 500 m time trial
2006 Dutch National Track Championships

Race details
- Dates: December 28, 2006
- Stages: 1
- Distance: 0.5 km (0.31 mi)
- Winning time: 35.922

Medalists
	Gold	Willy Kanis
	Silver	Lianne Wagtho
	Bronze	Sigrid Jochems

The women's 500 m track time trial at the 2006 Dutch National Track Championships in Alkmaar took place at Sportpaleis Alkmaar on December 28, 2006. Seven athletes participated in the contest.

Willy Kanis won the gold medal, Lianne Wagtho took silver and Sigrid Jochems won the bronze.

== Competition format ==
Because of the number of entries, there was not a qualification round for this discipline. Consequently, the event was run direct to the final.

== Final results ==
Rank	Name	Time
1st place, gold medalist(s)	Willy Kanis	35.922
2nd place, silver medalist(s)	Lianne Wagtho	38.956
3rd place, bronze medalist(s)	Sigrid Jochems	39.547
4	Kirsten Peetoom	40.308
5	Nina Kessler	41.029
6	Aniek Brand	42.812
7	Evelien Post	45.115
