= Nick Stöpler =

Dutch cyclist (born 1990)

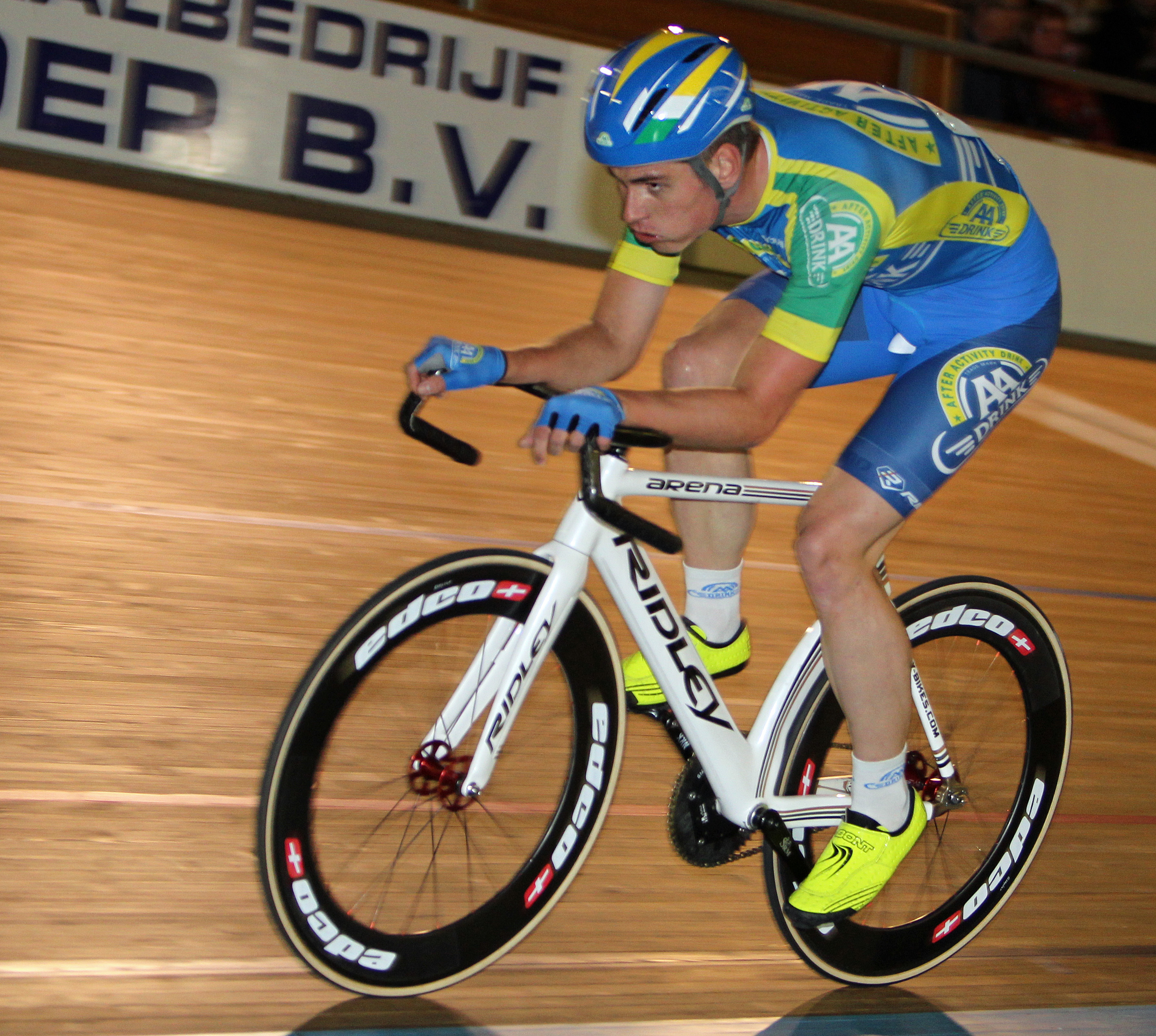
- Stöpler in 2013

Personal information
- Born: 12 November 1990 (age 35) Arnhem, Netherlands

Cycling career
- Sport: Cycling
- Current team: Retired
- Disciplines: Track; Road
- Role: Rider

Amateur team
- 2015–2016: UWTC De Volharding

Professional team
- 2009–2013: Koga–CreditForce

Nick Stöpler (born 12 November 1990) is a Dutch former professional road and track cyclist.

== Major results ==
2006
1st Madison, National Junior Championships (with Michael Vingerling)
2007
1st Madison, National Junior Championships (with Michael Vingerling)
2009
1st Madison, National Championships (with Michael Vingerling)
2011
1st Points race, National Championships
1st Six Days of Tilburg (with Yoeri Havik)
UEC European Under-23 Track Championships (with Yoeri Havik)

2nd Points race
3rd Madison

3rd Six Days of Amsterdam (with Yoeri Havik)
2016
1st Madison, National Championships (with Melvin van Zijl)
