= 2012 Dutch National Track Championships – Women's individual pursuit =

Women's individual pursuit
2012 Dutch National Track Championships

Race details
- Dates: 28 December 2012
- Stages: 1
- Distance: 3 km (1.864 mi)

Medalists
	Gold	Kirsten Wild
	Silver	Amy Pieters
	Bronze	Laura van der Kamp

The women's individual pursuit at the 2012 Dutch National Track Championships in Apeldoorn took place at Omnisport Apeldoorn on December 28, 2012. 8 athletes participated in the contest.

== Preview ==
The title holder, Ellen van Dijk and the main favourite to win the gold did not participate at the 2012 Dutch National Track Championships. The other favourites were the numbers two and three of 2011: Kirsten Wild and Amy Pieters.

== Competition format ==
The tournament started with a qualifying round. The two fastest qualifiers advanced to the gold medal final. The numbers three and four competed against each other for the bronze medal.

== Results ==
=== Qualification ===
The qualification round started at 17:05.

Rank	Name	Time	Note
1	Kirsten Wild	3:42.762	Q
2	Amy Pieters	3.44.988	Q
3	Judith Bloem	3.53.728	q
4	Laura van der Kamp	3.55.242	q
5	Winanda Spoor	3.57.739	
6	Birgitta Roos	3.58.119	
7	Rozanne Slik	3.59.129	
8	Daisy Rodenburg	4.06.120	

=== Finals ===
The finals started at 19:30.

Bronze medal match

Name	Time	Rank
Laura van der Kamp	3.54.480	3rd place, bronze medalist(s)
Judith Bloem	3.54.908	4

Gold medal match

Name	Time	Rank
Kirsten Wild	caught opponent	1st place, gold medalist(s)
Amy Pieters	caught	2nd place, silver medalist(s)

=== Final results ===
Rank	Name	Time
1st place, gold medalist(s)	Kirsten Wild	caught opponent
2nd place, silver medalist(s)	Amy Pieters	caught
3rd place, bronze medalist(s)	Laura van der Kamp	3.54.480
4	Judith Bloem	3.54.908
5	Winanda Spoor	3.57.739
6	Birgitta Roos	3.58.119
7	Rozanne Slik	3.59.129
8	Daisy Rodenburg	4.06.120

Results from nkbaanwielrennen.nl.
