= 2006 Dutch National Track Championships – Men's points race =

Men's points race
2006 Dutch National Track Championships

Race details
- Dates: December 28, 2006
- Stages: 1

Medalists
	Gold	Pim Ligthart
	Silver	Arno van der Zwet
	Bronze	Sander Lormans

The men's points race at the 2006 Dutch National Track Championships in Alkmaar took place at Sportpaleis Alkmaar on December 28, 2006. 22 athletes participated in the contest.

Pim Ligthart won the points race with 2 points ahead of Arno van der Zwet and 4 points ahead of Sander Lormans.

== Final results (top 12) ==
Rank	Name	Points
1st place, gold medalist(s)	Pim Ligthart	49
2nd place, silver medalist(s)	Arno van der Zwet	47
3rd place, bronze medalist(s)	Sander Lormans	45
4	Niki Terpstra	43
5	Dennis Smit	38
6	Michel Kreder	37
7	Tim van der Zanden	29
8	Bobbie Traksel	28
9	Jan Hopman	20
10	Hans Dekkers	17
11	Jorrit Walgien	16
12	Jeff Vermeulen	8
