= 2020 UCI Track Cycling World Championships – Women's madison =

Women's madison at the 2020 UCI Track Cycling World Championships
- Venue: Velodrom
- Location: Berlin, Germany
- Dates: 29 February
- Competitors: 36 from 18 nations
- Teams: 18
- Winning points: 36

Medalists
gold medal	Kirsten Wild; Amy Pieters	Netherlands
silver medal	Clara Copponi; Marie Le Net	France
bronze medal	Letizia Paternoster; Elisa Balsamo	Italy

The Women's madison competition at the 2020 UCI Track Cycling World Championships was held on 29 February 2020.

== Results ==
The race was started at 17:10. 120 km were raced with 12 sprints.

Rank	Name	Nation	Laps points	Sprint points	Total points
1st place, gold medalist(s)	Kirsten Wild; Amy Pieters	Netherlands		36	36
2nd place, silver medalist(s)	Clara Copponi; Marie Le Net	France		24	24
3rd place, bronze medalist(s)	Letizia Paternoster; Elisa Balsamo	Italy		20	20
4	Jolien D'hoore; Lotte Kopecky	Belgium		13	13
5	Amalie Dideriksen; Julie Leth	Denmark		12	12
6	Elinor Barker; Neah Evans	Great Britain		9	9
7	Daria Pikulik; Wiktoria Pikulik	Poland		9	9
8	Maria Novolodskaya; Diana Klimova	Russia		4	4
9	Jennifer Valente; Megan Jastrab	United States		2	2
10	Franziska Brauße; Lisa Klein	Germany	−20	5	−15
11	Lydia Boylan; Lydia Gurley	Ireland	−20	3	−17
12	Ganna Solovei; Anna Nahirna	Ukraine	−20	0	−20
13	Léna Mettraux; Aline Seitz	Switzerland	−20	0	−20
14	Leung Bo Yee; Pang Yao	Hong Kong	−20	0	−20
15	Yumi Kajihara; Kisato Nakamura	Japan	−40	0	−40
16	Wang Xiaofei; Liu Jiali	China	−40	0	−40
–	Amy Cure; Annette Edmondson	Australia	Did not finish		
–	Palina Pivavarava; Ina Savenka	Belarus	Did not finish		
