= 2019 UCI Track Cycling World Championships – Women's madison =

Women's madison at the 2019 UCI Track Cycling World Championships
- Venue: BGŻ Arena
- Location: Pruszków, Poland
- Dates: 2 March
- Competitors: 36 from 18 nations
- Teams: 18
- Winning points: 33

Medalists
gold medal	Kirsten Wild; Amy Pieters	Netherlands
silver medal	Georgia Baker; Amy Cure	Australia
bronze medal	Amalie Dideriksen; Julie Leth	Denmark

The Women's madison competition at the 2019 UCI Track Cycling World Championships was held on 2 March 2019.

== Results ==
The race was started at 17:38. 120 km were raced with 12 sprints.

Rank	Name	Nation	Laps points	Sprint points	Total points
1st place, gold medalist(s)	Kirsten Wild; Amy Pieters	Netherlands	0	33	33
2nd place, silver medalist(s)	Georgia Baker; Amy Cure	Australia	0	31	31
3rd place, bronze medalist(s)	Amalie Dideriksen; Julie Leth	Denmark	0	24	24
4	Neah Evans; Katie Archibald	Great Britain	0	15	15
5	Letizia Paternoster; Maria Giulia Confalonieri	Italy	0	14	14
6	Gulnaz Badykova; Maria Novolodskaya	Russia	0	9	9
7	Lotte Kopecky; Jolien D'hoore	Belgium	0	8	8
8	Daria Pikulik; Wiktoria Pikulik	Poland	0	5	5
9	Shannon McCurley; Lydia Boylan	Ireland	0	2	2
10	Clara Copponi; Pascale Jeuland	France	0	2	2
11	Yumi Kajihara; Kie Furuyama	Japan	0	0	0
12	Léna Mettraux; Aline Seitz	Switzerland	0	0	0
13	Ganna Solovei; Anna Nahirna	Ukraine	0	0	0
14	Lizbeth Salazar; Sofía Arreola	Mexico	−20	0	−20
—	Leung Bo Yee; Pang Yao	Hong Kong	Did not finish		
—	Michaela Drummond; Racquel Sheath	New Zealand	Did not finish		
—	Lucie Hochmann; Kateřina Kohoutková	Czech Republic	Did not finish		
—	Allison Beveridge; Kinley Gibson	Canada	Did not finish		
