= 2006 Dutch National Track Championships – Men's keirin =

Men's keirin
2006 Dutch National Track Championships

Race details
- Dates: December 28, 2006
- Stages: 1

Medalists
	Gold	Theo Bos
	Silver	Teun Mulder
	Bronze	Patrick Bos

The men's keirin at the 2006 Dutch National Track Championships in Alkmaar took place at Sportpaleis Alkmaar on December 28, 2006.

Theo Bos won the gold medal, Teun Mulder took silver and Patrick Bos won the bronze.

== Final results (top 12) ==
Rank	Name
1.	Theo Bos
2.	Teun Mulder
3.	Patrick Bos
5.	Vincent Weening
6.	Yondi Schmidt
7.	Dick Junior Post
8.	Jelger Bisschop
9.	Jorrit Slaman
10.	Ynse Taylor
11.	Tjarco Cuppens
12.	Ivar Peetoom
