= 2010 Dutch National Track Championships – Women's points race =

Women's points race
2010 Dutch National Track Championships

Race details
- Dates: 28 December 2010
- Stages: 1

Medalists
	Gold	Kirsten Wild
	Silver	Amy Pieters
	Bronze	Ellen van Dijk

The women's points race at the 2010 Dutch National Track Championships in Apeldoorn took place at Omnisport Apeldoorn on December 28, 2010. 17 athletes participated in the contest.

Kirsten Wild won the gold medal, Amy Pieters took silver and Ellen van Dijk won the bronze.

== Competition format ==
There were no qualification rounds for this discipline. Consequently, the event was run direct to the final.

== Results ==
Rank	Name	Points
1st place, gold medalist(s)	Kirsten Wild	49
2nd place, silver medalist(s)	Amy Pieters	39
3rd place, bronze medalist(s)	Ellen van Dijk	38
4	Chantal Blaak	36
5	Vera Koedooder	34
6	Roxane Knetemann	23
7	Natalie van Gogh	21
8	Rozanne Slik	1
9	Nathaly van Wesdonk	1
10	Nina Kessler	0
11	Winanda Spoor	-15
12	Esra Tromp	-17
13	Ymke Stegink	-20
14	Silke Kogelman	-20
15	Ilona den Hartog	-20
16	Nadia Stappenbelt	-20
17	Margo Klomp	-20

Results from wielerpunt.com.
