= Hinojos =

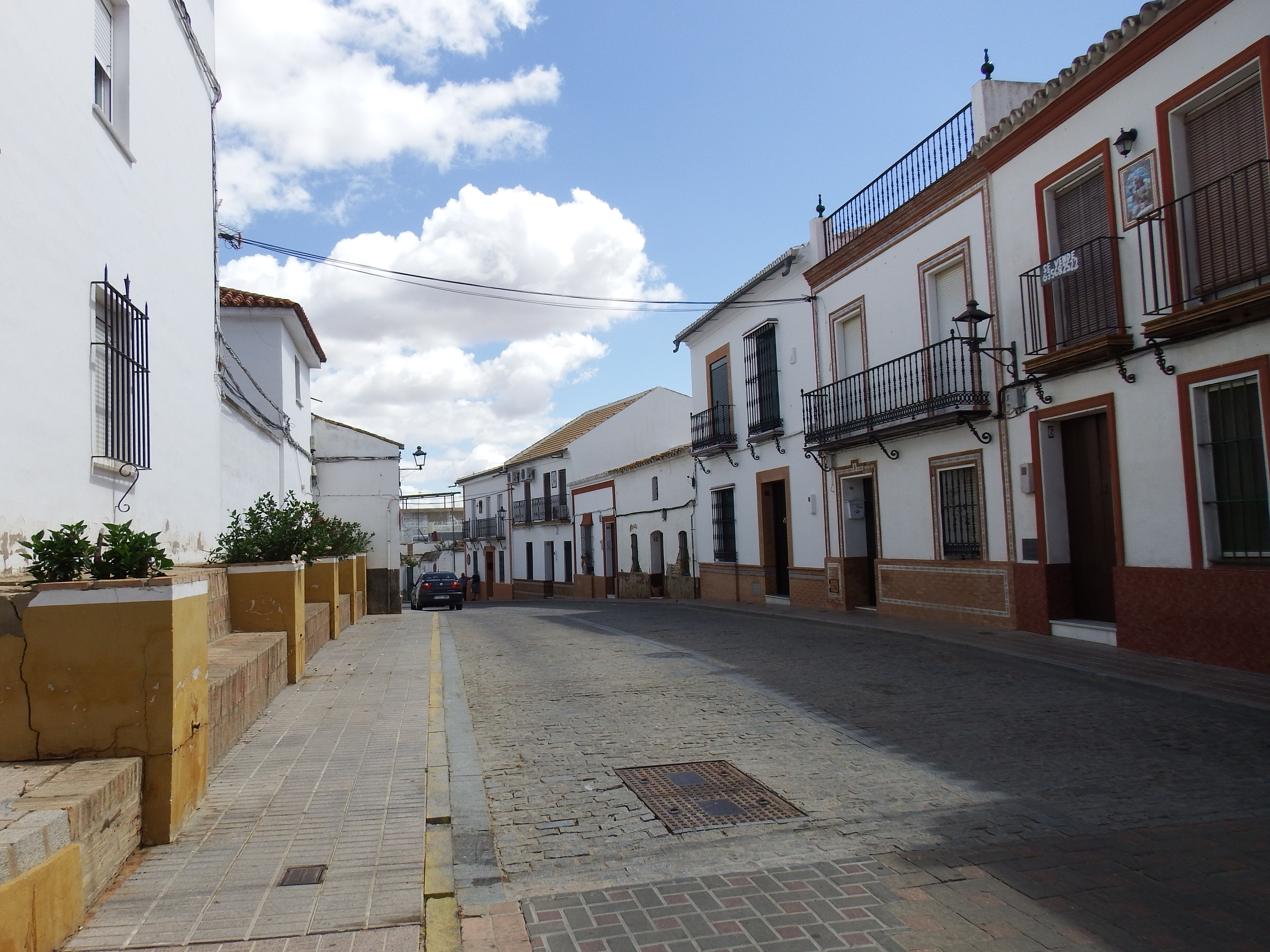

- Flag Coat of arms

- Location of Hinojos in Spain
- Coordinates: 37°18′N 6°23′W
- Country: Spain
- Autonomous community: Andalusia
- Province: Huelva

Area
  - Total: 319.88 km^{2} (123.51 sq mi)
- Elevation: 70 m (230 ft)

Population (2025-01-01)
  - Total: 4,097
  - Density: 12.81/km^{2} (33.17/sq mi)
- Time zone: UTC+1 (CET)
  - Summer (DST): UTC+2 (CEST)
- Website: http://www.hinojos.es/es/

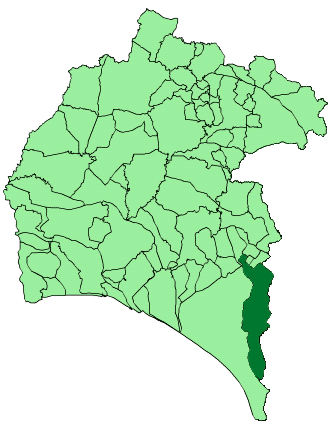
Map of Hinojos, Huelva

Hinojos is a town and municipality located in the province of Huelva, Spain. According to the 2025 municipal register, it has a population of 4,097 inhabitants.

== See also ==
- List of municipalities in Huelva
