= Ibai Salas =

Spanish cyclist

Personal information
- Full name: Ibai Salas Zorrozua
- Nickname: El Kaiman
- Born: 4 July 1991 (age 35) Bilbao, Spain

Cycling career
- Sport: Cycling
- Current team: Suspended
- Discipline: Road
- Role: Rider

Amateur teams
- 2010–2011: Seguros Bilbao
- 2012–2013: Caja Rural Amateur
- 2013: Caja Rural–Seguros RGA (stagiaire)

Professional team
- 2014–2018: Burgos BH

Ibai Salas Zorrozua (born 4 July 1991 in Bilbao) is a Spanish cyclist, who is currently suspended from the sport, after a positive biological passport offence.

== Suspension ==
In October 2018, Salas was suspended for four years due to issues with his biological passport. The case was leaked in June, and resurfaced several months later, when he was originally handed a three-year and nine-month ban, which was later extended to four years. This was the third suspension handed to a Burgos BH rider in the past year, as David Belda and Igor Merino were suspended for testing positive to human growth hormone and EPO.

== Major results ==
2015
8th Circuito de Getxo
2017
7th Klasika Primavera
9th Circuito de Getxo
