= 2008 Dutch National Track Championships – Women's individual pursuit =

Women's individual pursuit
2008 Dutch National Track Championships

Race details
- Dates: 29–30 December 2008
- Stages: 1
- Distance: 3 km (1.9 mi)
- Winning time: 3:40.124

Medalists
	Gold	Ellen van Dijk
	Silver	Kirsten Wild
	Bronze	Vera Koedooder

The women's individual pursuit at the 2008 Dutch National Track Championships in Apeldoorn took place at Omnisport Apeldoorn from 29 December to 30 December 2008. 12 athletes participated in the contest.

Ellen van Dijk won for the second consecutive time the gold medal, Kirsten Wild took silver and Vera Koedooder won the bronze.

== Preview ==
Ellen van Dijk, the champion of 2007 was the main favourite to win the title. Van Dijk finished earlier the year second at the 2008 European Track Championships and fifth at the 2008 Track Cycling World Championships and became European time trial champion at the 2008 European Road Championships. Elise van Hage, who also participated and finished 16h in the individual pursuit at the European Track Championships, did not participate.

== Competition format ==
The tournament started with a qualifying round. The two fastest qualifiers advanced to the gold medal final. The numbers three and four competed against each other for the bronze medal.

== Schedule ==
Monday 29 December
15:10 Qualifying
Tuesday 30 December
11:00 Finals

== Results ==
=== Finals ===
Bronze medal match

Name	Time	Rank
Vera Koedooder	3:51.482	3rd place, bronze medalist(s)
Natalie van Gogh	3:57.603	4

Gold medal match

Name	Time	Rank
Ellen van Dijk	3:40.124	1st place, gold medalist(s)
Kirsten Wild	3:43.483	2nd place, silver medalist(s)

== Final results ==
Rank	Name	Time
1st place, gold medalist(s)	Ellen van Dijk	3:40.124
2nd place, silver medalist(s)	Kirsten Wild	3:43.483
3rd place, bronze medalist(s)	Vera Koedooder	3:51.482
4	Natalie van Gogh	3:57.603
5	Agnieta Francke	4:00.447
6	Martine van der Herberg	4:01.621
7	Marieke van Nek	4:04.947
8	Janine Herweijer	4:08.629
9	Hanneke Tenniglo	4:16.128
10	Femke Nijhof	4:17.294
11	Moniek Tenniglo	4:19.720
12	Marie-Louise Konkelaar	4:45.448

Results from adelaar.cms.nederland.net
