= 2007 Dutch National Track Championships – Women's individual pursuit =

Women's individual pursuit
2007 Dutch National Track Championships

Race details
- Dates: 29–30 December 2007
- Stages: 1
- Distance: 3 km (1.864 mi)
- Winning time: 3:42.828

Medalists
	Gold	Ellen van Dijk
	Silver	Marianne Vos
	Bronze	Kirsten Wild

The women's individual pursuit at the 2007 Dutch National Track Championships in Alkmaar took place at Sportpaleis Alkmaar from 29 to 30 December 2007. 14 athletes participated in the contest.

Ellen van Dijk won the gold medal, Marianne Vos took silver and Kirsten Wild won the bronze.

== Competition format ==
The tournament started with a qualifying round on 29 December. The two fastest qualifiers advanced to the gold medal final on 30 December. The numbers three and four competed against each other for the bronze medal.

== Results ==
=== Qualification ===
Rank	Name	Time	Note
1st place, gold medalist(s)	Ellen van Dijk	3:41.500	Q
2nd place, silver medalist(s)	Marianne Vos	3:46.488	Q
3rd place, bronze medalist(s)	Marlijn Binnendijk	3:47.605	q
4	Kirsten Wild	3:47.773	q
5	Vera Koedooder	3:48.965	
6	Chantal Blaak	3:49.152	
7	Regina Bruins	3:52.086	
8	Liesbeth Bakker	3:54.211	
9	Lianne Wagtho	3:58.801	
10	Anne Eversdijk	4:00.160	
11	Anne de Wildt	4:02.781	
12	Eva Heijmans	4:11.344	
13	Marieke van Nek	4:15.527	
14	Josien van den Heerik	4:20.984	

=== Finals ===
Bronze medal match

Name	Time	Rank
Marlijn Binnendijk		4
Kirsten Wild	3:47.934	3rd place, bronze medalist(s)

Gold medal match

Name	Time	Rank
Ellen van Dijk	3:42.828	1st place, gold medalist(s)
Marianne Vos	3:50.160	2nd place, silver medalist(s)

== Final results ==
Rank	Name	Time
1st place, gold medalist(s)	Ellen van Dijk	3:42.828
2nd place, silver medalist(s)	Marianne Vos	3:50.160
3rd place, bronze medalist(s)	Kirsten Wild	3:47.934
4	Marlijn Binnendijk	
5	Vera Koedooder	3.48.965
6	Chantal Blaak	3.49.152
7	Regina Bruins	3.52.086
8	Liesbeth Bakker	3.54.211
9	Lianne Wagtho	3.58.801
10	Anne Eversdijk	4.00.160
11	Anne de Wildt	4.02.781
12	Eva Heijmans	4.11.344
13	Marieke van Nek	4.15.527
14	Josien van den Heerik	4.20.984
