= Lotte van Hoek =

Dutch cyclist (born 1991)

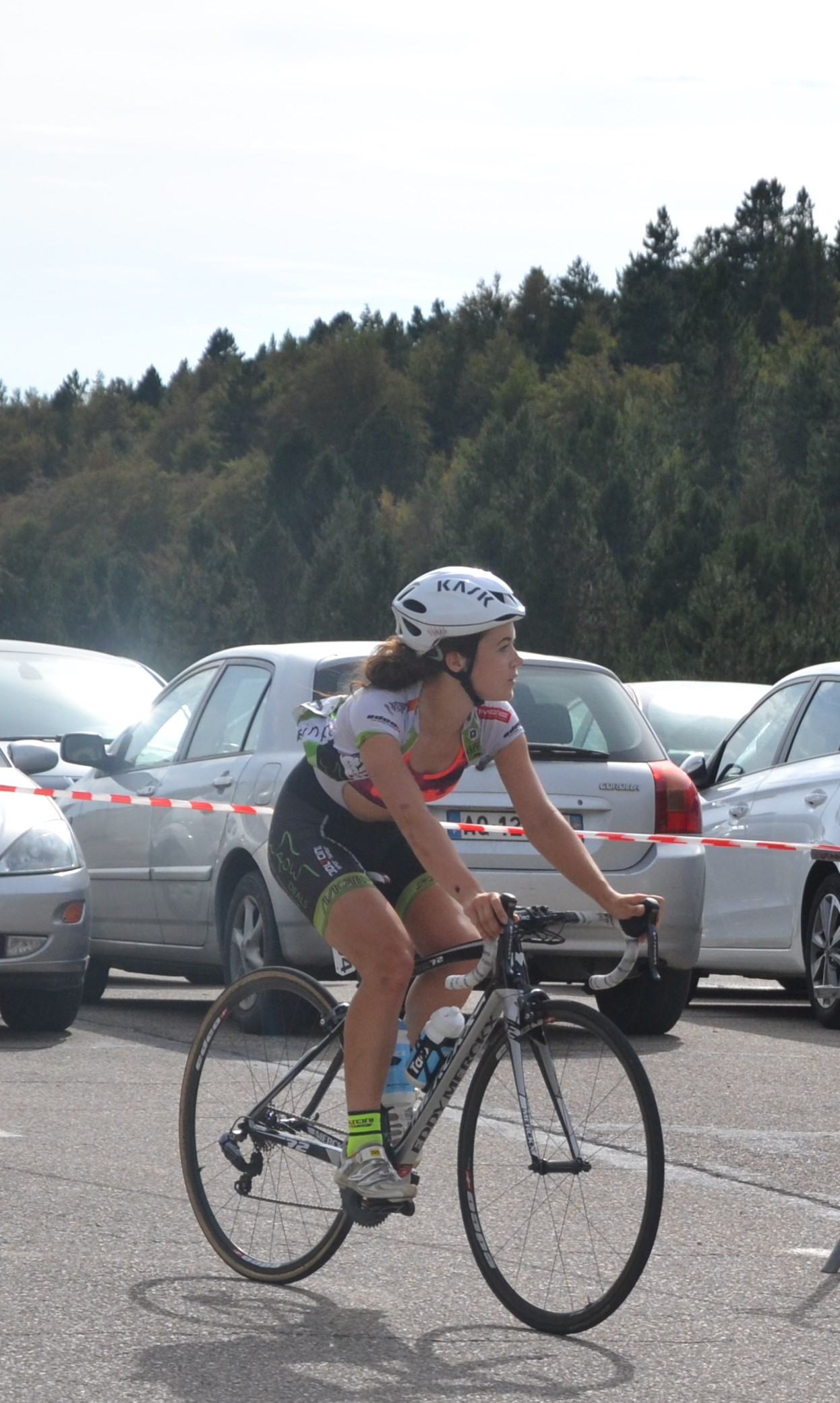
- Van Hoek in 2016

Personal information
- Full name: Lotte van Hoek
- Born: 8 August 1991 (age 35) Vlijmen, Netherlands

Cycling career
- Sport: Cycling
- Current team: Retired
- Discipline: Road
- Role: Rider

Professional teams
- 2015: Feminine Cycling Team
- 2016–2018: Lares–Waowdeals

Lotte van Hoek (born 8 August 1991) is a Dutch former professional racing cyclist, who rode professionally between 2015 and 2018, for the Feminine Cycling Team and Doltcini–Van Eyck Sport.

== See also ==
- List of 2015 UCI Women's Teams and riders
