= Amy Pieters =

Dutch racing cyclist (born 1991)

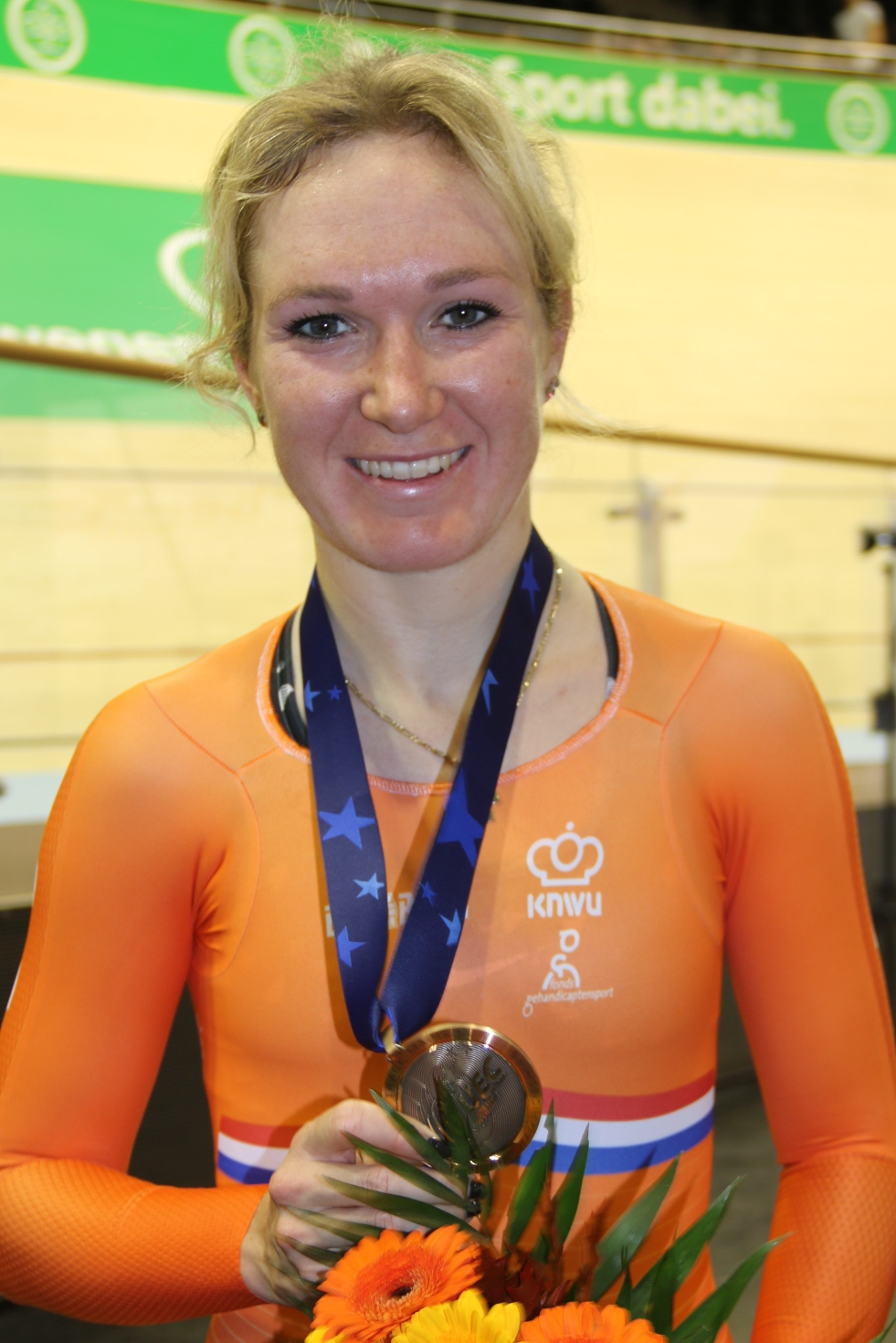
- Pieters winning bronze at the 2017 UEC European Track Championships

Personal information
- Born: 1 June 1991 (age 35) Haarlem, Netherlands
- Height: 1.64 m (5 ft 5 in)
- Weight: 58 kg (128 lb)

Cycling career
- Sport: Cycling
- Current team: Team SD Worx–Protime
- Disciplines: Road; Track
- Role: Rider
- Rider type: All-rounder

Professional teams
- 2010: Merida
- 2011–2015: Skil Koga
- 2016: Wiggle High5
- 2017–: Boels–Dolmans

Major wins
- Road One-day races and Classics European Road Race Championships (2019) National Road Race Championships (2021) Omloop Het Nieuwsblad (2014) Ronde van Drenthe (2018) Nokere Koerse (2021) Dwars door Vlaanderen (2014, 2015, 2016) GP de Plouay (2018) Track World Championships Madison (2019, 2020, 2021)
Medal record
Representing the Netherlands
Women's track cycling
World Championships
Gold medal – first place	2019 Pruszków	Madison
Gold medal – first place	2020 Berlin	Madison
Gold medal – first place	2021 Roubaix	Madison
Silver medal – second place	2018 Apeldoorn	Madison
European Championships
Bronze medal – third place	2017 Berlin	Madison
Bronze medal – third place	2018 Glasgow	Madison
Bronze medal – third place	2019 Apeldoorn	Madison
Women's road bicycle racing
World Championships
Gold medal – first place	2019 Yorkshire	Mixed team relay
European Championships
Gold medal – first place	2019 Alkmaar	Road race
Gold medal – first place	2019 Alkmaar	Mixed team relay
Bronze medal – third place	2021 Trentino	Mixed team relay

Amy Pieters (born 1 June 1991) is a Dutch professional road and track cyclist, who is contracted to ride for UCI Women's WorldTeam Team SD Worx–Protime. She was a member of the Dutch team that finished sixth at the 2012 Summer Olympics in the team pursuit (together with Ellen van Dijk, Kirsten Wild and Vera Koedooder).

On 23 December 2021, Pieters was placed in an induced coma and underwent emergency surgery to relieve pressure on her brain caused by a fall that day during a training ride near Alicante with the Dutch national track team. After being repatriated to the Netherlands the following month, Pieters had regained consciousness in April but, due to the brain injury sustained, doctors were unsure of her "residual symptoms and remaining abilities". In October 2022, Pieters was able to take her first steps since the fall, at a neuro-rehabilitation centre in Woerden. In 2023 she suffered a momentary setback in her recovery after suffering multiple epileptic seizures. As of January 2025 she was living in an apartment in Amersfoort adapted to her condition. Pieters can walk again, but has only short-term memory and limited speech ability.

== Personal life ==
Pieters is the daughter of former professional Peter Pieters, the niece of Sjaak Pieters and the sister of Roy Pieters.

== Career achievements ==
=== Major results ===
==== Road ====
2006
National Novices Road Championships

1st Time trial
2nd Road race

2007
National Novices Road Championships

1st Road race
2nd Time trial

2008
National Junior Road Championships

2nd Road race
2nd Time trial

4th Time trial, UCI Junior World Championships
2009
2nd Time trial, National Junior Road Championships
3rd Overall Omloop van Borsele
2010
1st Draai rond de Kraai
2nd Twee Bruggenronde van Zaandam
3rd Ronde van Barendrecht
2011
1st Twee Bruggenronde van Zaandam
1st Berkelse Wielerdag
1st Ronde van Zwanenburg
2nd Molenomloop van de Schermer
2nd Afwachtingswedstrijd Olympia's Tour
2nd Van Gogh Ronde van Nuenen
3rd Gooik–Geraardsbergen–Gooik
3rd Draai rond de Kraai
3rd Noordwijk Classic
3rd Profronde van Oostvoorne
6th Overall Thüringen Rundfahrt der Frauen

1st Young rider classification

7th Omloop van Borsele
8th Omloop van het Hageland
9th Overall Ster Zeeuwsche Eilanden
2012
1st Afwachtingswedstrijd Olympia's Tour
1st Wielerronde van Lekkerkerk
1st Young rider classification Energiewacht Tour
2nd Regio Kampioenschap West
2nd Noordwijk Classic
3rd Overall Ster Zeeuwsche Eilanden
5th EPZ Omloop van Borsele
6th Road race, UEC European Under-23 Road Championships
2013
1st Regio Kampioenschap West
1st Noordwijk Classic
1st Profronde van Stiphout
2nd Omloop der Kempen
2nd Acht van Chaam
2nd Profronde van Surhuisterveen
3rd Tour of Chongming Island World Cup
3rd Open de Suède Vårgårda
3rd Wielerronde van Obdam
4th 7-Dorpenomloop Aalburg
6th Overall Belgium Tour

1st Young rider classification

9th Overall Tour of Chongming Island
2014
1st Omloop Het Nieuwsblad
2nd Overall Tour of Qatar

1st Young rider classification
1st Stage 2

2nd Open de Suède Vårgårda
3rd Holland Hills Classic
4th Overall BeNe Ladies Tour
5th Overall Belgium Tour
6th Overall The Women's Tour
6th Drentse 8 van Dwingeloo
7th Le Samyn
8th Overall Festival Luxembourgeois du cyclisme féminin Elsy Jacobs
9th Ronde van Drenthe World Cup
10th Gooik–Geraardsbergen–Gooik
2015
1st Dwars door Vlaanderen
1st Prologue La Route de France
2nd Road race, National Road Championships
2nd Ronde van Drenthe World Cup
3rd Marianne Vos Classic
3rd La Course by Le Tour de France
4th Novilon EDR Cup
4th Gooik–Geraardsbergen–Gooik
5th Gent–Wevelgem
6th Overall Belgium Tour
6th Crescent Women World Cup Vårgårda
7th Overall Holland Ladies Tour
7th Omloop Het Nieuwsblad
7th Le Samyn des Dames
8th Omloop van het Hageland
9th Overall Tour of Qatar
9th Overall Thüringen Rundfahrt der Frauen
9th Holland Hills Classic
10th Overall Festival Luxembourgeois du cyclisme féminin Elsy Jacobs
10th Acht van Westerveld
2016
1st Prologue La Route de France
3rd Le Samyn
4th Gent–Wevelgem
4th Crescent Vårgårda UCI Women's WorldTour
5th Overall Energiewacht Tour
6th Overall Tour of Qatar
6th Overall Holland Ladies Tour
7th Overall The Women's Tour

1st Stage 2

7th Gooik–Geraardsbergen–Gooik
10th Omloop van de IJsseldelta
2017
1st Crescent Vårgårda UCI Women's WorldTour TTT
1st Stage 2 The Women's Tour
2nd Team time trial, UCI Road World Championships
2nd Le Samyn
4th Tour de Yorkshire
6th Overall Healthy Ageing Tour

1st Stages 1b & 2 (TTT)

7th Pajot Hills Classic
7th Amstel Gold Race
9th Overall Thüringen Rundfahrt
9th Overall Holland Ladies Tour

1st Combativity classification, Prologue

2018
1st Overall Healthy Ageing Tour

1st Stages 2 & 3b (TTT)

1st Ronde van Drenthe
1st Crescent Vårgårda TTT
1st GP de Plouay – Bretagne
1st Stage 3 Emakumeen Euskal Bira
UCI Road World Championships

2nd Team time trial
8th Road race

2nd Road race, National Road Championships
2nd Dwars door Vlaanderen
2nd Tour of Flanders for Women
5th Overall The Women's Tour
5th Gent–Wevelgem
8th Overall Holland Ladies Tour
2019
1st Mixed team relay, UCI Road World Championships
UEC European Road Championships

1st Road race
1st Mixed team relay

2nd Overall BeNe Ladies Tour
2nd Drentse Acht van Westerveld
3rd Road race, National Road Championships
3rd Overall The Women's Tour

1st Stage 6

3rd GP de Plouay – Bretagne
4th Overall Healthy Ageing Tour
4th Ronde van Drenthe
4th Nokere Koerse
5th Overall Holland Ladies Tour
5th Gent–Wevelgem
5th Durango-Durango Emakumeen Saria
5th Postnord UCI WWT Vårgårda West Sweden
10th Tour of Flanders
2020
2nd Tour of Flanders
5th Liège–Bastogne–Liège
9th Gent–Wevelgem
10th Road race, UEC European Road Championships
2021
1st Road race, National Road Championships
1st Nokere Koerse
3rd Mixed team relay, UEC European Road Championships
3rd Omloop Het Nieuwsblad
4th Overall The Women's Tour

1st Stage 2

5th Overall Healthy Ageing Tour

1st Points classification

6th Overall Thüringen Ladies Tour
6th Le Samyn
6th Dwars door de Westhoek
7th Overall Holland Ladies Tour
9th Classic Brugge–De Panne

==== Track ====
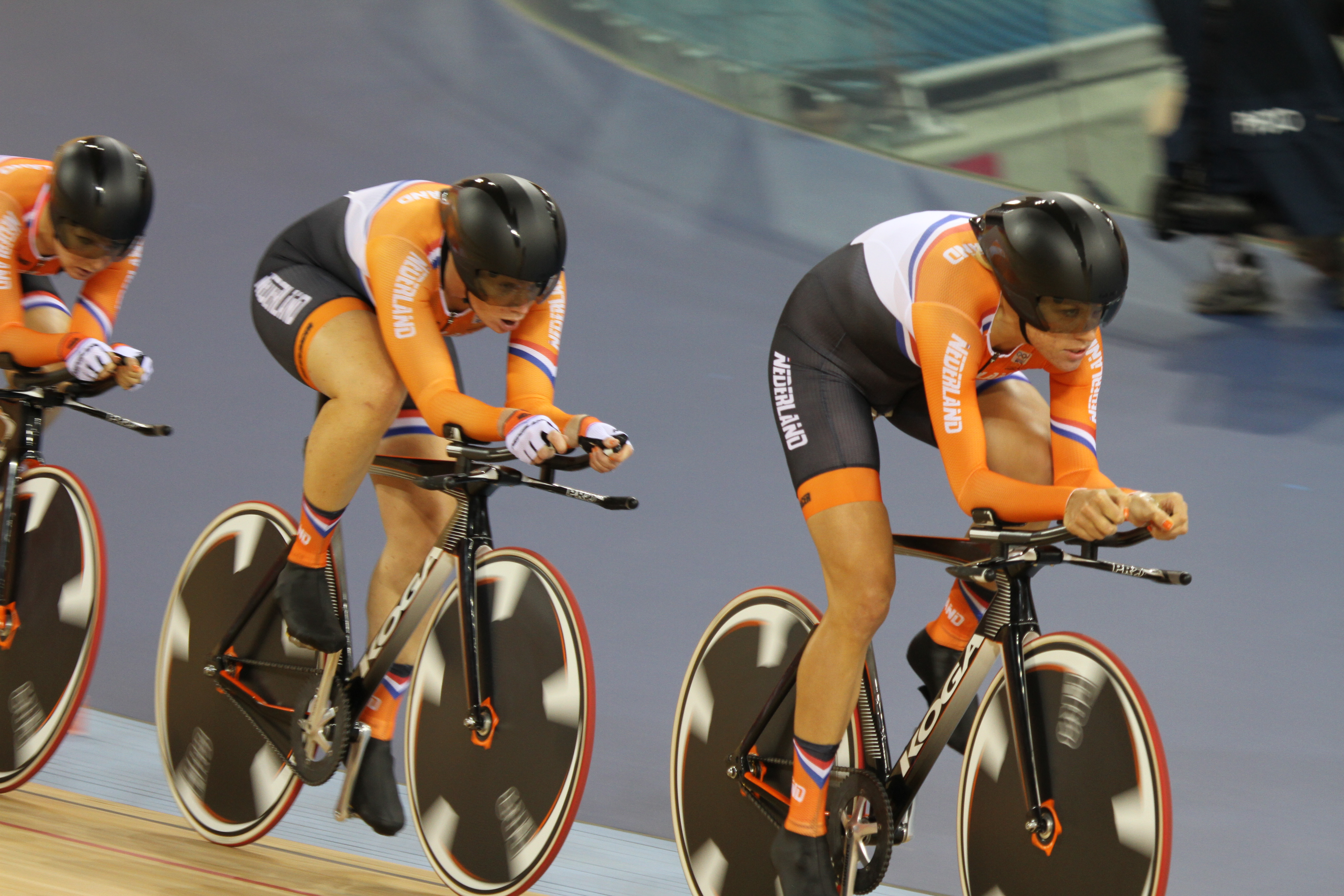
Pieters (left) together with Ellen van Dijk (right) and Kirsten Wild (centre) at the 2012 Summer Olympics.

2006
1st Omnium, National Novice Championships
2007
National Junior Championships

1st 500m time trial
1st Individual pursuit
1st Keirin
1st Points race
2nd Scratch

2008
National Junior Championships

1st 500m time trial
1st Individual pursuit
1st Keirin
1st Points race
1st Scratch

3rd Points race, UEC European Junior Championships
3rd Omloop van Borsele
3rd Six Days of Amsterdam
2009
2nd Team pursuit, 2008–09 UCI Track Cycling World Cup Classics, Copenhagen (with Vera Koedooder & Ellen van Dijk)
3rd Individual pursuit, National Championships
4th Team pursuit, UCI World Championships (with Vera Koedooder & Ellen van Dijk)
2010
National Championships

1st Madison (with Roxane Knetemann)
2nd Points race)

5th Team pursuit, UCI World Championships (with Vera Koedooder & Ellen van Dijk)
9th Team pursuit, UEC European Championships (with Ellen van Dijk & Laura van der Kamp)
2011
1st Team pursuit, 2011–12 UCI Track Cycling World Cup, Astana (with Kirsten Wild & Ellen van Dijk)
National Championships

2nd Points race
2nd Madison (with Kelly Markus)
3rd Individual pursuit

2012
1st Individual pursuit, UEC European Under-23 Championships
National Championships

2nd Individual pursuit
2nd Omnium
3rd Madison (with Kelly Markus)
3rd Scratch

6th Team pursuit, Olympic Games (with Ellen van Dijk & Kirsten Wild)
2014
2nd Points race, Revolution – Round 3, Manchester
2015
1st Scratch, National Championships
2017
1st Individual pursuit, National Championships
1st Madison, Zesdaagse Vlaanderen-Gent (with Kirsten Wild)
3rd Madison, UEC European Championships (with Kirsten Wild)
2018
National Championships

1st Individual pursuit
2nd Points race

2nd Madison, UCI World Championships (with Kirsten Wild)
3rd Madison, UEC European Championships (with Kirsten Wild)
2019
1st Madison, UCI World Championships (with Kirsten Wild)
3rd Madison, UEC European Championships (with Kirsten Wild)
2020
1st Madison, UCI World Championships (with Kirsten Wild)
2021
1st Madison, UCI World Championships (with Kirsten Wild)

=== National team pursuit records ===
After the introduction of the women's 3000m team pursuit at the 2007–08 track cycling season, Pieters was five times part of the team pursuit squad when they established a new Dutch national record. She is not the record holder anymore.

Time	Speed (km/h)	Cyclists	Event	Location of race	Date	Ref
3:31.045	51.250	Ellen van Dijk; Amy Pieters; Vera Koedooder	2008–09 UCI Track Cycling World Cup Classics – Round 5 (qualification)	(Denmark) Copenhagen	15 February 2009	
3:29.730	51.494	Ellen van Dijk; Amy Pieters; Vera Koedooder	2008–09 UCI Track Cycling World Cup Classics – Round 5 (gold-medal race)	(Denmark) Copenhagen	15 February 2009	
3:29.379	51.581	Ellen van Dijk; Amy Pieters; Vera Koedooder	2009 UCI Track Cycling World Championships (bronze-medal race)	(Poland) Pruszków	26 March 2009	
3:25.156	52.642	Ellen van Dijk; Amy Pieters; Vera Koedooder	2010 UCI Track Cycling World Championships (qualifying)	(Denmark) Ballerup	25 March 2010	
3:21.550	53.584	Ellen van Dijk; Kirsten Wild; Amy Pieters	2011–12 UCI Track Cycling World Cup – Round 1 (gold-medal race)	(Kazakhstan) Astana	4 November 2011	

== See also ==
- List of Dutch Olympic cyclists
