= Sportpaleis Alkmaar =

Indoor arena in Alkmaar, Netherlands

Coordinates: 52.6347°N 4.7166°E

- Interactive map of Sportpaleis Alkmaar
- Location: Alkmaar, the Netherlands
- Capacity: 4750

Construction
- Opened: 1964
- Renovated: 2003

The Sportpaleis Alkmaar is a velodrome and multisport indoor arena in Alkmaar, the Netherlands. The original velodrome, which was built in 1964 and made of concrete, was renovated in 2003. The concrete track was replaced by a wooden track and was now situated in a completely covered hall. The cycling track is 250 m (820 ft) in length and 6.5 m (21 ft) in width. The maximum slope is 42°. The track encloses a multifunctional indoor sportsfield. The hall has a capacity for 4750 spectators.

== See also ==
- List of cycling tracks and velodromes
