= 2007 Dutch National Track Championships – Women's scratch =

Women's scratch
2007 Dutch National Track Championships

Race details
- Dates: 28 December 2007
- Stages: 1

Medalists
	Gold	Marianne Vos
	Silver	Adrie Visser
	Bronze	Elise van Hage

The women's scratch race at the 2007 Dutch National Track Championships in Alkmaar took place at Sportpaleis Alkmaar on December 28, 2007. 27 riders competed in the contest.

== Race ==
The initial qualification heats were won by Ellen van Dijk and Vera Koedooder. The gold medal macht was won by Marianne Vos ahead of Adrie Visser and Elise van Hage.

== Competition format ==
Due to the number of entries the competition started with a qualification round. The qualification round included two heats and the top 12 riders of each heat qualified for the final race.

== Results ==
=== Qualification round ===
The top 12 athletes of each semi-final advanced to the final match.

Heat 1

Rank	Name	Note
1	Ellen van Dijk	Q
2	Marianne Vos	Q
3	Roxane Knetemann	Q
4	Joukje Braam	Q
5	Maxime Groenewegen	Q
6	Suzanne van Veen	Q
7	Nina Kessler	Q
8	Liesbeth Bakker	Q
9	Chantal Blaak	Q
10	Anne de Wildt	Q
11	Adriene Snijder	Q
12	Elisabeth Braam	Q
13	Josien van den Heerik	
14	Marieke van Nek	

Heat 2

Rank	Name	Note
1	Vera Koedooder	Q
2	Elise van Hage	Q
3	Sissy van Alebeek	Q
4	Adrie Visser	Q
5	Kirsten Wild	Q
6	Marlijn Binnendijk	Q
7	Lianne Wagtho	Q
8	Anne Eversdijk	Q
9	Regina Bruins	Q
10	Ilona Meiring	Q
11	Yvonne Baltus	Q
12	Eva Heijmans	Q
13	Anneloes Stoelwinder	

Qualification results.

=== Final (top 10) ===
Rank	Name
1st place, gold medalist(s)	Marianne Vos
2nd place, silver medalist(s)	Adrie Visser
3rd place, bronze medalist(s)	Elise van Hage
4	Ellen van Dijk
5	Marlijn Binnendijk
6	Kirsten Wild
7	Suzanne van Veen
8	Ilona Meiring
9	Sissy van Alebeek
10	Chantal Blaak

Final results
