= 2007 Dutch National Track Championships – Women's points race =

Women's points race
2007 Dutch National Track Championships

Race details
- Dates: December 29–30, 2007
- Stages: 1

Medalists
	Gold	Marianne Vos
	Silver	Marlijn Binnendijk
	Bronze	Chantal Blaak

The women's points race at the 2007 Dutch National Track Championships in Alkmaar took place at Sportpaleis Alkmaar from December 29, to December 30, 2007.

== Competition format ==
The competition started with a qualification round. The best riders of each two heats on December 29 qualified for the final match on December 30.

== Final results (top 10) ==
Rank	Name	Points
1st place, gold medalist(s)	Marianne Vos	74
2nd place, silver medalist(s)	Marlijn Binnendijk	57
3rd place, bronze medalist(s)	Chantal Blaak	56
4	Ellen van Dijk	
5	Vera Koedooder	
6	Elise van Hage	
7	Kirsten Wild	
8	Roxane Knetemann	
9	Regina Bruins	
10	Anne Eversdijk	

Final results
