= 2008 Dutch National Track Championships – Women's points race =

Women's points race
2008 Dutch National Track Championships

Race details
- Dates: 27–30 December 2008
- Stages: 1

Medalists
	Gold	Vera Koedooder
	Silver	Kirsten Wild
	Bronze	Nina Kessler

The women's points race at the 2008 Dutch National Track Championships in Apeldoorn took place at Omnisport Apeldoorn from 27 December to 30 December 2008. 24 athletes participated in the contest.

== Competition format ==
The tournament started with a qualifying round, including two heats. The best 8 riders of each heat advanced to the final race.

== Schedule ==
Saturday 27 December
21:35 Qualifying
Tuesday 30 December
15:00 Final race

== Final results ==
Rank	Name	Points	Bonus
1st place, gold medalist(s)	Vera Koedooder	36	20
2nd place, silver medalist(s)	Kirsten Wild	27	
3rd place, bronze medalist(s)	Nina Kessler	25	20
4	Ellen van Dijk	20	
5	Elise van Hage	15	
6	Marlijn Binnendijk	11	
7	Chantal Blaak	8	
8	Anne Eversdijk	3	
9	Natalie van Gogh	1	
10	Ilona Meiring	1	
11	Liesbeth Bakker	1	
12	Agnieta Francke	0	
13	Eva Heijmans	0	
14	Samantha van Steenis	0	
15	Suzanne van Veen	0	
16	Lianne Wagtho	0	

Final results
