= Dutch National Track Championships – Women's points race =

The Dutch National Track Championships – Women's points race is the Dutch national championship points race event held annually at the Dutch National Track Championships. The event was first held in 1989.

== Medalists ==
Championships	Gold	Silver	Bronze
1989	Angelique Jekel-Greupink	Petra de Bruin	Mary van Gaalen
1990 Alkmaar	Cyntha Lutke Schipholt	Petra Grimbergen	Leontien Zijlaard-van Moorsel
1991 Alkmaar	Petra de Boer-Grimbergen	Ingrid Haringa	Astrid Schop
1992 Alkmaar	Ingrid Haringa	Leontien Zijlaard-van Moorsel	Petra de Boer-Grimbergen
1993 Alkmaar	Ingrid Haringa	Maria Jongeling	Petra de Boer-Grimbergen
1994	Ingrid Haringa	Maria Jongeling	Natasha den Ouden
1995	Ingrid Haringa	Margaretha Groen	Judith van der Burg
1996	Ingrid Haringa	Debby Mansveld	Karin Leine
1997	Ingrid Haringa	Leontien Zijlaard-van Moorsel	Karin Leine
1998	Leontien Zijlaard-van Moorsel	Sissy van Alebeek	Debby Mansveld
1999	Leontien Zijlaard-van Moorsel	Debby Mansveld	Anouska van der Zee
2000	Leontien Zijlaard-van Moorsel	Debby Mansveld	Janneke Vos
2001	Leontien Zijlaard-van Moorsel	Mirella van Melis	Marielle Romme-van Scheppingen
2002	Leontien Zijlaard-van Moorsel	Vera Koedooder	Sissy van Alebeek
2003 Amsterdam	Adrie Visser	Loes Gunnewijk	Vera Koedooder
2004 Alkmaar	Adrie Visser	Marlijn Binnendijk	Kristy Miggels
2005 Amsterdam	Adrie Visser	Marlijn Binnendijk	Roxane Knetemann
2006 Alkmaar	Adrie Visser	Marlijn Binnendijk	Vera Koedooder
2007 Alkmaar	Marianne Vos	Marlijn Binnendijk	Chantal Blaak
2008 Apeldoorn	Vera Koedooder	Kirsten Wild	Nina Kessler
2009 Alkmaar	Roxane Knetemann	Eva Heijmans	Kirsten Wild
2010 Apeldoorn	Kirsten Wild	Amy Pieters	Ellen van Dijk
2011 Apeldoorn	Kirsten Wild	Amy Pieters	Roxane Knetemann
2012 Apeldoorn	Roxane Knetemann	Kirsten Wild	Vera Koedooder
2013 Apeldoorn	Kirsten Wild	Amy Pieters	Judith Bloem
2014 Apeldoorn	Kirsten Wild	Amy Pieters	Nina Kessler
2015 Alkmaar	Vera Koedooder	Roxane Knetemann	Amy Pieters

Results from cyclebase.nl and cyclingarchives.com.

== Multiple champions ==
6 times champion: Ingrid Haringa
5 times champion: Leontien Zijlaard-van Moorsel
4 times champion: Adrie Visser
2 times champion: Kirsten Wild
