= 2006 Dutch National Track Championships – Women's points race =

Women's points race
2006 Dutch National Track Championships

Race details
- Dates: December 30, 2006
- Stages: 1
- Distance: 25 km (16 mi)

Medalists
	Gold	Adrie Visser
	Silver	Marlijn Binnendijk
	Bronze	Vera Koedooder

The women's points race at the 2006 Dutch National Track Championships in Alkmaar took place at Sportpaleis Alkmaar on December 30, 2006

== Competition format ==
There were no qualification rounds for this discipline. Consequently, the event was run direct to the final.

== Final results (top 10) ==
Rank	Name	Points
1st place, gold medalist(s)	Adrie Visser	43
2nd place, silver medalist(s)	Marlijn Binnendijk	19
3rd place, bronze medalist(s)	Vera Koedooder	14
4	Nina Kessler	
5	Roxane Knetemann	
6	Suzanne van Veen	
7	Liane Wagtho	
8	Kirsten Peetoom	
9	Ellen van Dijk	
10	Yvonne Baltus	

Final results
