= 2006 Dutch National Track Championships – Women's individual pursuit =

Women's individual pursuit
2006 Dutch National Track Championships

Race details
- Dates: December 29–30, 2006
- Stages: 1
- Distance: 3 km (1.864 mi)
- Winning time: 3:48.809

Medalists
	Gold	Vera Koedooder
	Silver	Marlijn Binnendijk
	Bronze	Ellen van Dijk

The women's individual pursuit at the 2006 Dutch National Track Championships in Alkmaar took place at Sportpaleis Alkmaar from December 29 to December 30, 2006.

Vera Koedooder won the gold medal, Marlijn Binnendijk took silver and Ellen van Dijk won the bronze.

== Competition format ==
The tournament started with a qualifying round on December 29. The two fastest qualifiers advanced to the gold medal final on December 30. The numbers three and four competed against each other for the bronze medal, also on December 30.

== Results ==
=== Qualification (top 4) ===
The qualification round took place in the afternoon of December 29.

Rank	Name	Time	Note
1st place, gold medalist(s)	Vera Koedooder	3:47.8	Q
2nd place, silver medalist(s)	Marlijn Binnendijk		Q
3rd place, bronze medalist(s)	Ellen van Dijk		q
4	Roxane Knetemann		q

Results from verakoedooder.nl.

=== Finals ===
The finals took place in the morning of December 30.

Bronze medal match

Name	Time	Rank
Ellen van Dijk	3:50.492	3rd place, bronze medalist(s)
Roxane Knetemann	3.59.670	4

Gold medal match

Name	Time	Rank
Vera Koedooder	3:48.809	1st place, gold medalist(s)
Marlijn Binnendijk	3:52.895	2nd place, silver medalist(s)

Results from nos.nl

== Final results (top 4) ==
Rank	Name	Time
1st place, gold medalist(s)	Vera Koedooder	3:48.809
2nd place, silver medalist(s)	Marlijn Binnendijk	3:52.895
3rd place, bronze medalist(s)	Ellen van Dijk	3:50.492
4	Roxane Knetemann	3.59.670

Results from nos.nl
