= 2010 Dutch National Track Championships – Women's scratch =

Women's scratch
2010 Dutch National Track Championships

Race details
- Dates: 30 December 2010
- Stages: 1
- Distance: 10 km (6.214 mi)

Medalists
| | Gold | Winanda Spoor |
| | Silver | Roxane Knetemann |
| | Bronze | Ellen van Dijk |

The women's scratch at the 2010 Dutch National Track Championships in Apeldoorn took place at Omnisport Apeldoorn on December 30, 2010. 18 athletes participated in the contest.

Winanda Spoor won the gold medal, Roxane Knetemann took silver and Ellen van Dijk won the bronze.

== Competition format ==
There were no qualification rounds for this discipline. Consequently, the event was run direct to the final. The competition consisted on 40 laps, making a total of 10 km.

== Results ==
| Rank | Name |
|---|---|
| 1st place, gold medalist(s) | Winanda Spoor |
| 2nd place, silver medalist(s) | Roxane Knetemann |
| 3rd place, bronze medalist(s) | Ellen van Dijk |
| 4 | Chantal Blaak |
| 5 | Kirsten Wild |
| 6 | Amy Pieters |
| 7 | Vera Koedooder |
| 8 | Nathalie van Gogh |
| 9 | Laura van der Kamp |
| 10 | Nathaly van Wesdonk |
| 11 | Samantha van Steenis |
| 12 | Rozanne Slik |
| 13 | Aafke Eshuis |
| 14 | Nina Kessler |
| 15 | Ymke Stegink |
| 16 | Nadia Stappenbelt |
| 17 | Ilona den Hartog |
| 18 | Silke Kogelman |

Results from wielerpunt.com.
