= 2008 Dutch National Track Championships – Women's scratch =

Women's scratch
2008 Dutch National Track Championships

Race details
- Dates: 27–28 December 2008
- Stages: 1
- Distance: 7.5 km (4.7 mi)

Medalists
	Gold	Kirsten Wild
	Silver	Ellen van Dijk
	Bronze	Elise van Hage

The women's scratch at the 2008 Dutch National Track Championships in Alkmaar took place at Sportpaleis Alkmaar from 27 December to 28 December 2008.

Kirsten Wild became for the first time in her career Dutch national track cycling champion. She won the final bunch sprint ahead of Ellen van Dijk and Elise van Hage.

== Schedule ==
Saturday December 27
18:15 Qualification
Sunday December 28
15:10 Final match

== Competition format ==
The competition was run over 7.5 km. The competition started with a qualification round. In different heats riders could qualify for the gold medal match.

== Race ==
During the final match different rides tried to escape of whom Suzanne de Goede, Anne Eversdijk and Vera Koedooder. However, everyone was pulled back by the pack and the race ended with a bunch sprint. Kirsten Wild won the sprint ahead of Ellen van Dijk and Elise van Hage.

== Final results ==
Final results
