= 2011 7-Dorpenomloop Aalburg =

Race details
- Dates: 28 May 2011
- Stages: 1
- Distance: 121.2 km (75.31 mi)
- Winning time: 2h 59' 47"

Results
	Winner	Marianne Vos (NED)	(Nederland Bloeit)
	Second	Annemiek van Vleuten (NED)	(Nederland Bloeit)
	Third	Kirsten Wild (NED)	(AA Drink–leontien.nl)

The 2011 7-Dorpenomloop Aalburg, also known as the Verti advies 7-Dorpenomloop van Aalburg due to sponsorships reasons, was the fifth running of the women's 7-Dorpenomloop Aalburg, an elite women's bicycle race in Aalburg, the Netherlands. It was held on 28 May 2013 over a distance of 121.2 kilometres (75.3 miles), starting and finishing in Aalburg. It was rated by the UCI as a 1.2 category race. It was the first year that the race was a UCI 1.2 category race, so it was also the first year that the race was part of the 2011 UCI women's cycling calendar.

== Results ==
	Cyclist	Team	Time
1	Marianne Vos (NED)	Nederland Bloeit	2h 59' 47"
2	Giorgia Bronzini (NED)	Nederland Bloeit	s.t.
3	Kirsten Wild (NED)	AA Drink–leontien.nl	s.t.
4	Chloe Hosking (AUS)	HTC–Highroad Women	+ 1"
5	Ellen van Dijk (NED)	HTC–Highroad Women	+ 1"
6	Suzanne de Goede (NED)	Skil-Koga	+ 1"
7	Martine Bras (NED)	Dolmans Landscaping Team	+ 1"
8	Iris Slappendel (NED)	Garmin–Cervélo	+ 5"
9	Irene van den Broek (NED)	AA Drink–leontien.nl	+ 5"
10	Adrie Visser (NED)	HTC–Highroad Women	+ 5"

s.t. = same time
