= 2008 World University Cycling Championship – Women's road race =

Women's Road Race
2008 World University Cycling Championship

Race details
- Dates: 25 May 2008
- Stages: 1
- Distance: 96.3 km (59.8 mi)
- Winning time: 2h 44' 25"

Medalists
	Gold	Elise van Hage (NED)
	Silver	Chantal Blaak (NED)
	Bronze	Annemiek van Vleuten (NED)

The Women's road race at the 2008 World University Cycling Championship took place on 25 May 2008 in Nijmegen, Netherlands. The race was 96.3 km long.

Ellen van Dijk, who won the title in 2006 (and was still a student) did not defend her title.

== Final classification ==
Rank	Rider	Time	Behind
1st place, gold medalist(s)	Elise van Hage (NED)	2.44'25	—N/a
2nd place, silver medalist(s)	Chantal Blaak (NED)	2.45'26	1'01
3rd place, bronze medalist(s)	Annemiek van Vleuten (NED)	2.47'03	2'38
4	Loes Markerink (NED)	2.47'26	3'01
5	Iris Slappendel (NED)	2.47'26	3'01
6	Nathalie Lamborelle (LUX)	2.47'26	3'01
7	Sandra Dietel (GER)	2.47'26	3'01
8	Dahlina Rosyida (IND)	2.47'26	3'01
9	Suzanne Van Veen (NED)	2.47'26	3'01
10	Aksana Papko (BLR)	2.47'26	3'01
11	Audrey Cordon (FRA)	2.47'26	3'01
12	Alena Amialiusik (BLR)	2.47'26	3'01
13	Daniela Pintarelli (AUT)	2.47'26	3'01
14	Christine Majerus (LUX)	2.47'33	3'08
15	Rasa Leleivytė (LTU)	2.52'10	7'45
16	Ine Beyen (BEL)	2.54'31	10'06
17	Sofie De Vuyst (BEL)	2.54'31	10'06
18	Sjoukje Dufour (BEL)	2.54'31	10'06
19	Stefanie Degel (GER)	2.54'31	10'06
20	Ekaterina Novozhilova (RUS)	2.54'31	10'06
21	Katarína Uhláriková (SLO)	2.54'31	10'06
22	Alena Konečná (CZE)	2.54'31	10'06
23	Bertine Spijkerman (NED)	2.54'31	10'06
24	Hannah Verhaeghe (BEL)	2.54'31	10'06
25	Nina Mikhailova (RUS)	2.54'31	10'06
26	Anne Arnouts (BEL)	2.58'00	13'35
27	Jana Kyptova (CZE)	2.58'00	13'35
28	Bernadette Schober (AUT)	2.58'00	13'35
29	Tatsiana Sharakova (BLR)	2.58'00	13'35
30	Lianne Wagtho (NED)		
31	Lien Beyen (BEL)		
32	Annelies Van Doorslaer (BEL)		
33	Jana Suss (GER)		
34	Desiree Schuler (GER)		
35	Chantal Hofmann (LUX)		
36	Mónika Király (HUN)		
37	Chihiro Kawamata (JPN)		
