= Knetemann =

Knetemann is a surname. Notable people with the surname include:

- Gerrie Knetemann (1951–2004), Dutch cyclist
- Roxane Knetemann (born 1987), Dutch cyclist
