= Aalburg =

- Former municipality
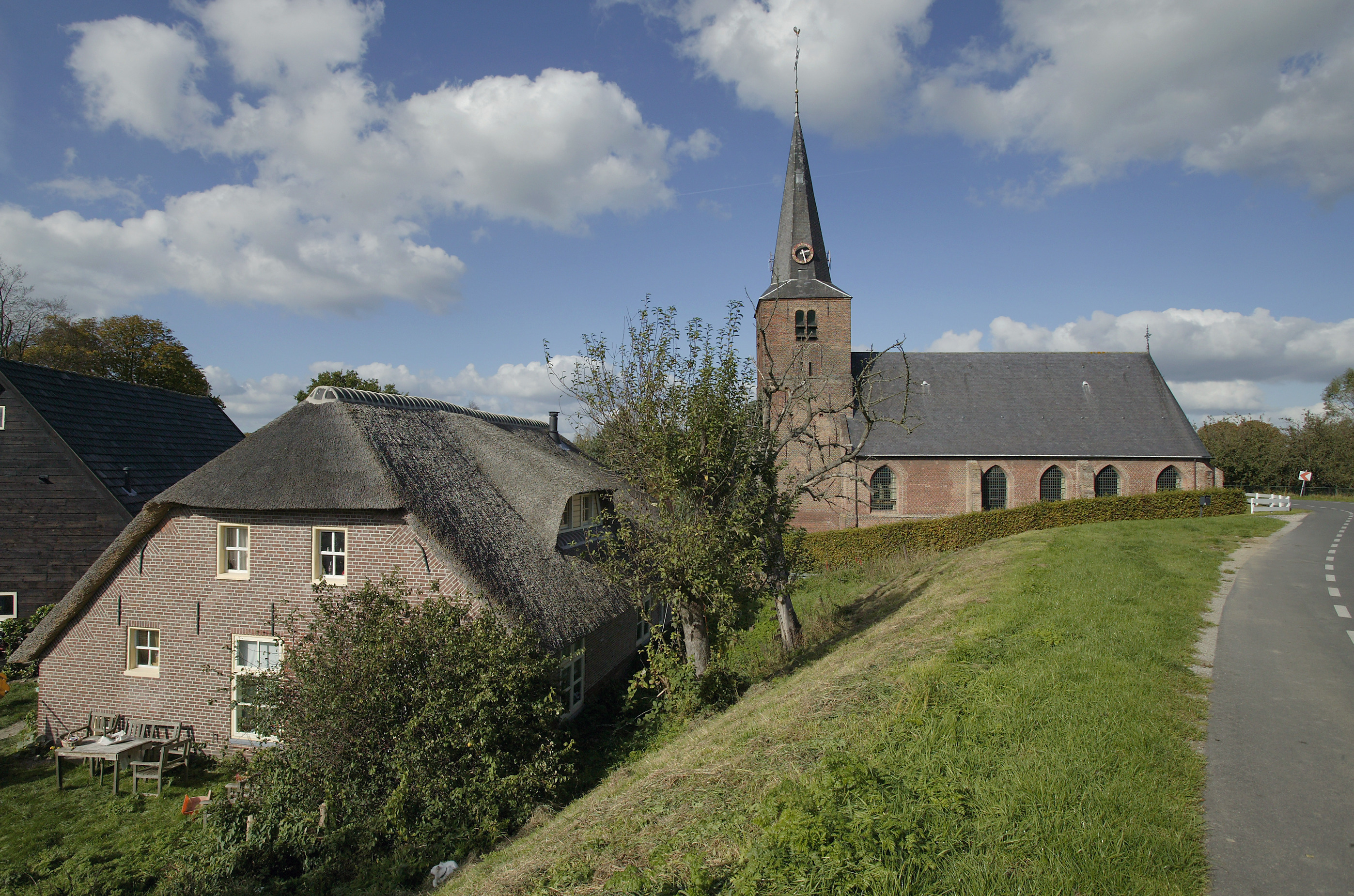
- Church in Aalburg

- Flag Coat of arms

- Location in North Brabant

- Location within North Brabant Location within Netherlands Location within Europe
- Coordinates: 51°46′N 5°8′E
- Country: Netherlands
- Province: North Brabant
- Municipality: Altena
- Established: 1973
- Merged: 2019

Area
  - Total: 53.17 km^{2} (20.53 sq mi)
  - Land: 50.41 km^{2} (19.46 sq mi)
  - Water: 2.76 km^{2} (1.07 sq mi)
- Elevation: 3 m (9.8 ft)

Population (January 2021)
  - Total: data missing
- Time zone: UTC+1 (CET)
  - Summer (DST): UTC+2 (CEST)
- Postcode: 4260–4269
- Area code: 0416
- Website: www.aalburg.nl

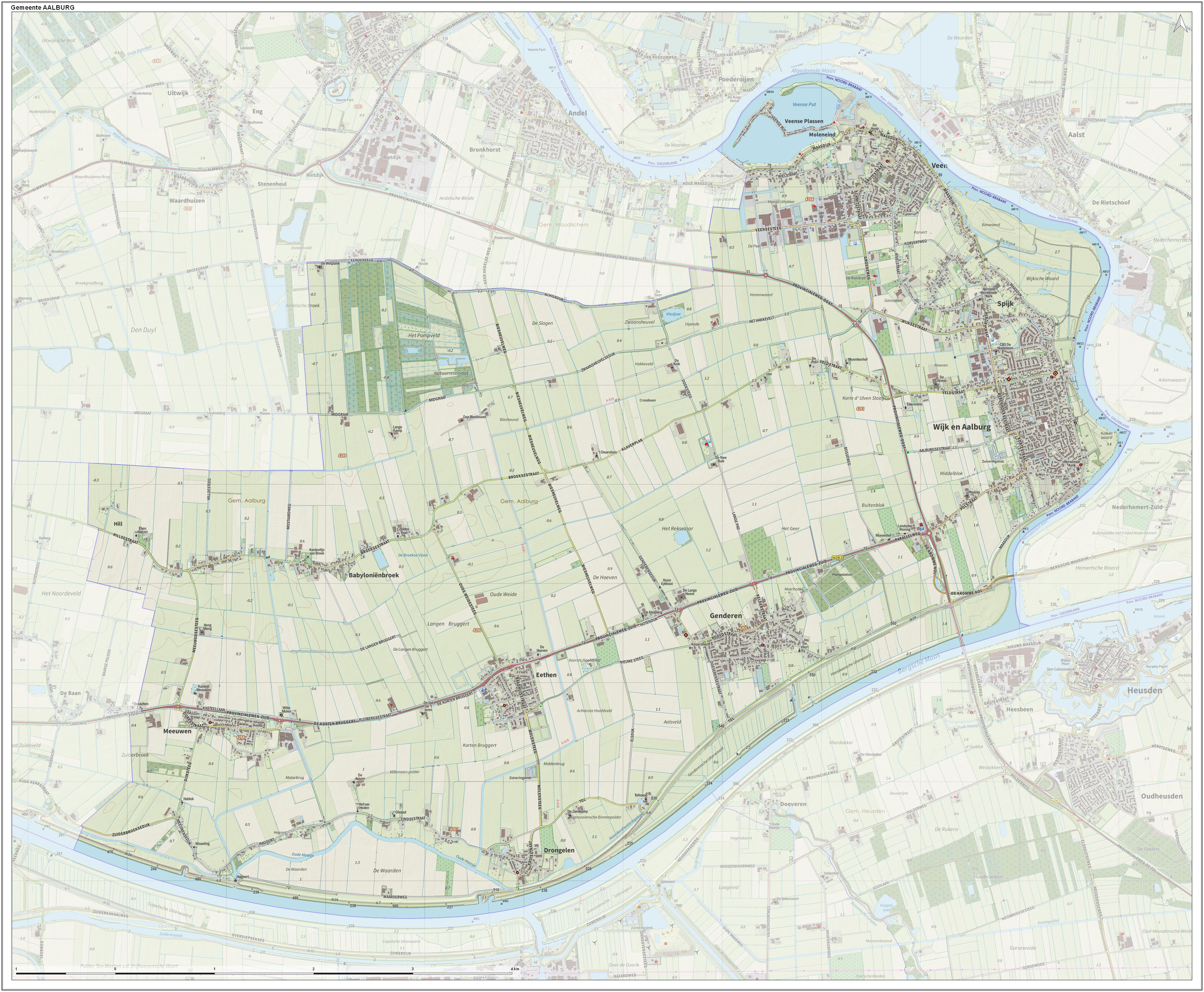
Topographic map of the municipality of Aalburg, June 2015

Aalburg (Dutch pronunciation: [ˈaːlbʏr(ə)x]) is a former municipality in the southern Netherlands, in the province of North Brabant. The municipality had been formed in 1973 by the merging of the former municipalities of Eethen, Veen, and Wijk en Aalburg. On January 1, 2019 it joined Werkendam and Woudrichem in the new municipality of Altena.

== Population centres ==
- Babyloniënbroek
- Drongelen
- Eethen
- Genderen
- Meeuwen
- Veen
- Wijk en Aalburg (town hall)

== Sport ==
=== Cycling ===
Aalburg hosted the annual 7-Dorpenomloop Aalburg, an elite women's road bicycle race since 2007.
