= 2015 Dutch National Track Championships =

- Venue: Alkmaar, Netherlands
- Date(s): 20, 28–29 December 2015

The 2015 Dutch National Track Championships were the Dutch national Championship for track cycling, organized by the KNWU. They took place in Alkmaar, the Netherlands on 20, 28 and 29 December 2015

== Medal summary ==
Event	Gold	Silver	Bronze
Men's Events
Men's sprint	Theo Bos	Roy van den Berg	Matthijs Büchli
Men's 1 km time trial	Theo Bos	Jeffrey Hoogland	Roy Eefting
Men's keirin	Matthijs Büchli	Hugo Haak	Jeffrey Hoogland
Men's individual pursuit	Wim Stroetinga	Jenning Huizega	Roy Pieters
Men's scratch	Roy Pieters	Jan Willem van Schip	Jesper Asselman
Men's points race	Wim Stroetinga	Pim Ligthart	Jesper Asselman
Men's madison	Dylan van Baarle; Yoeri Havik	Jesper Asselman; Nick Stöpler	Michael Vingerling; Melvin van Zijl
Women's Events
Women's sprint	Laurine van Riessen	Elis Ligtlee	Kyra Lamberink
Women's 500 m time trial	Laurine van Riessen	Elis Ligtlee	Kyra Lamberink
Women's keirin	Laurine van Riessen	Elis Ligtlee	Haliegh Dolman
Women's individual pursuit	Kirsten Wild	Amy Pieters	Judith Bloem
Women's scratch	Amy Pieters	Kirsten Wild	Kelly Markus
Women's points race	Vera Koedooder	Roxane Knetemann	Amy Pieters
Women's madison	Kirsten Wild; Nina Kessler	Kelly Markus; Amy Pieters	Roxane Knetemann; Vera Koedooder
