= Dutch National Track Championships – Women's scratch =

The Dutch National Track Championships – Women's scratch is the Dutch national championship scratch race event held annually at the Dutch National Track Championships. The event was first introduced in 2003.

== Medalists ==
| Championships | Gold | Silver | Bronze |
|---|---|---|---|
| 2003 Amsterdam | Adrie Visser | Kristy Miggels | Vera Koedooder |
| 2004 Alkmaar | Adrie Visser | Kristy Miggels | Vera Koedooder |
| 2005 Amsterdam | Adrie Visser | Marlijn Binnendijk | Roxane Knetemann |
| 2006 Alkmaar | Adrie Visser | Suzanne van Veen | Marlijn Binnendijk |
| 2007 Alkmaar | Marianne Vos | Ellen van Dijk | Elise van Hage |
| 2008 Apeldoorn | Kirsten Wild | Adrie Visser | Elise van Hage |
| 2009 Alkmaar | Nathalie van Gogh | Eva Heijmans | Adriene Snijder |
| 2010 Apeldoorn | Winanda Spoor | Roxane Knetemann | Ellen van Dijk |
| 2011 Apeldoorn | Kirsten Wild | Natalie van Gogh | Roxane Knetemann |
| 2012 Apeldoorn | Kirsten Wild | Kelly Markus | Amy Pieters |
| 2013 Apeldoorn | Kirsten Wild | Amy Pieters | Roxane Knetemann |
| 2014 Apeldoorn | Winanda Spoor | Kirsten Wild | Kelly Markus |
| 2015 Alkmaar | Amy Pieters | Kirsten Wild | Kelly Markus |

Results from cyclebase.nl and cyclingarchives.com.

== Multiple champions ==
4 times champion: Adrie Visser
3 times champion: Kirsten Wild
