= Eethen =

- Village
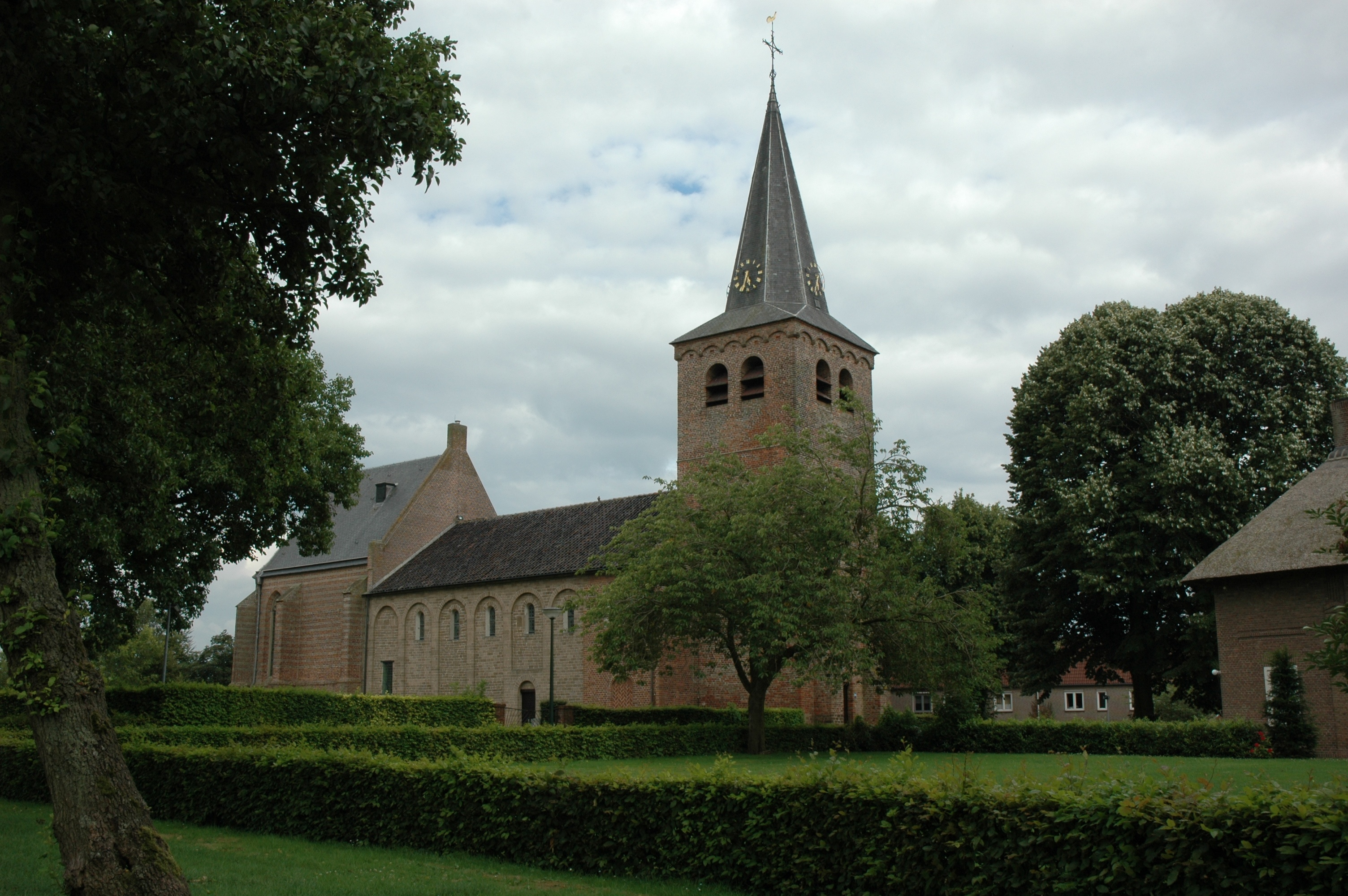
- Dutch Reformed church Eethen

- Coat of arms

- Location in the province of North Brabant in the Netherlands Eethen (Netherlands)
- Coordinates: 51°43′51″N 5°3′10″E
- Country: Netherlands
- Province: North Brabant
- Municipality: Altena

Area
  - Total: 5.86 km^{2} (2.26 sq mi)
- Elevation: 1.4 m (4.6 ft)

Population (2021)
  - Total: 890
  - Density: 150/km^{2} (390/sq mi)
- Time zone: UTC+1 (CET)
  - Summer (DST): UTC+2 (CEST)
- Postal code: 4266
- Dialing code: 0416

Eethen is a village in the Dutch province of North Brabant. It is located in the municipality of Altena.

The village was first mentioned in 850 as Atina. The etymology is unclear. Eethen developed on a sand hill in the Middle Ages and part of the original ring road is still visible.

The Dutch Reformed church dates from the 12th century. The tower was added in the late 14th century. In 1944, it was severely damaged in World War II fighting and was restored and reconstructed between 1948 and 1951.

Eethen was home to 310 people 1840. Eethen was a separate municipality between 1923 and 1973. It was formed by the merging of the municipalities of Drongelen, Genderen, and Meeuwen, and became a part of Aalburg in 1973.

== Gallery ==
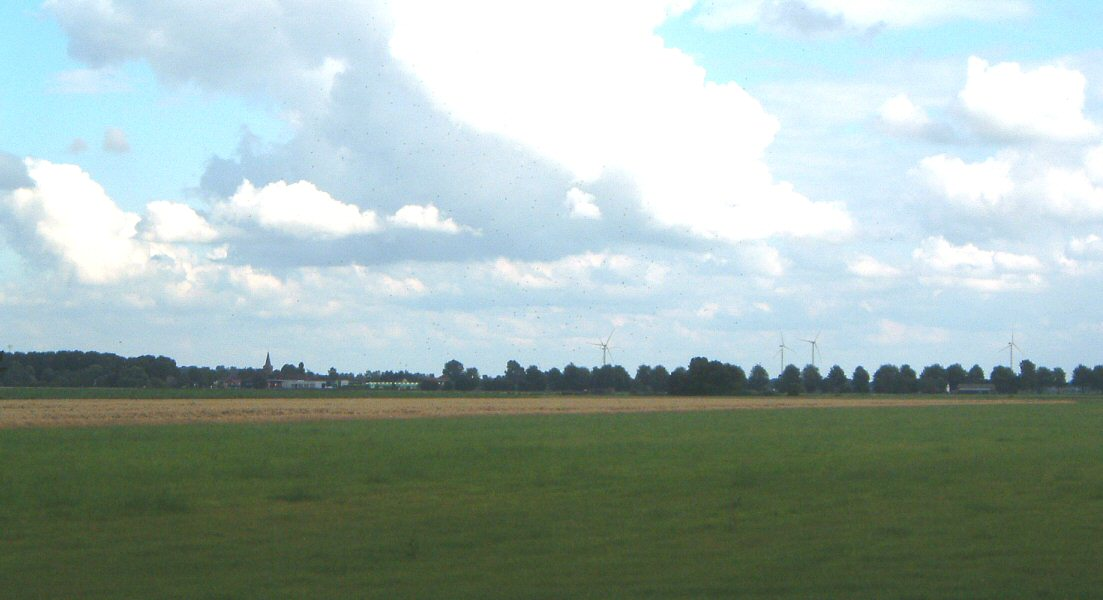
View of Eethen in July 2007

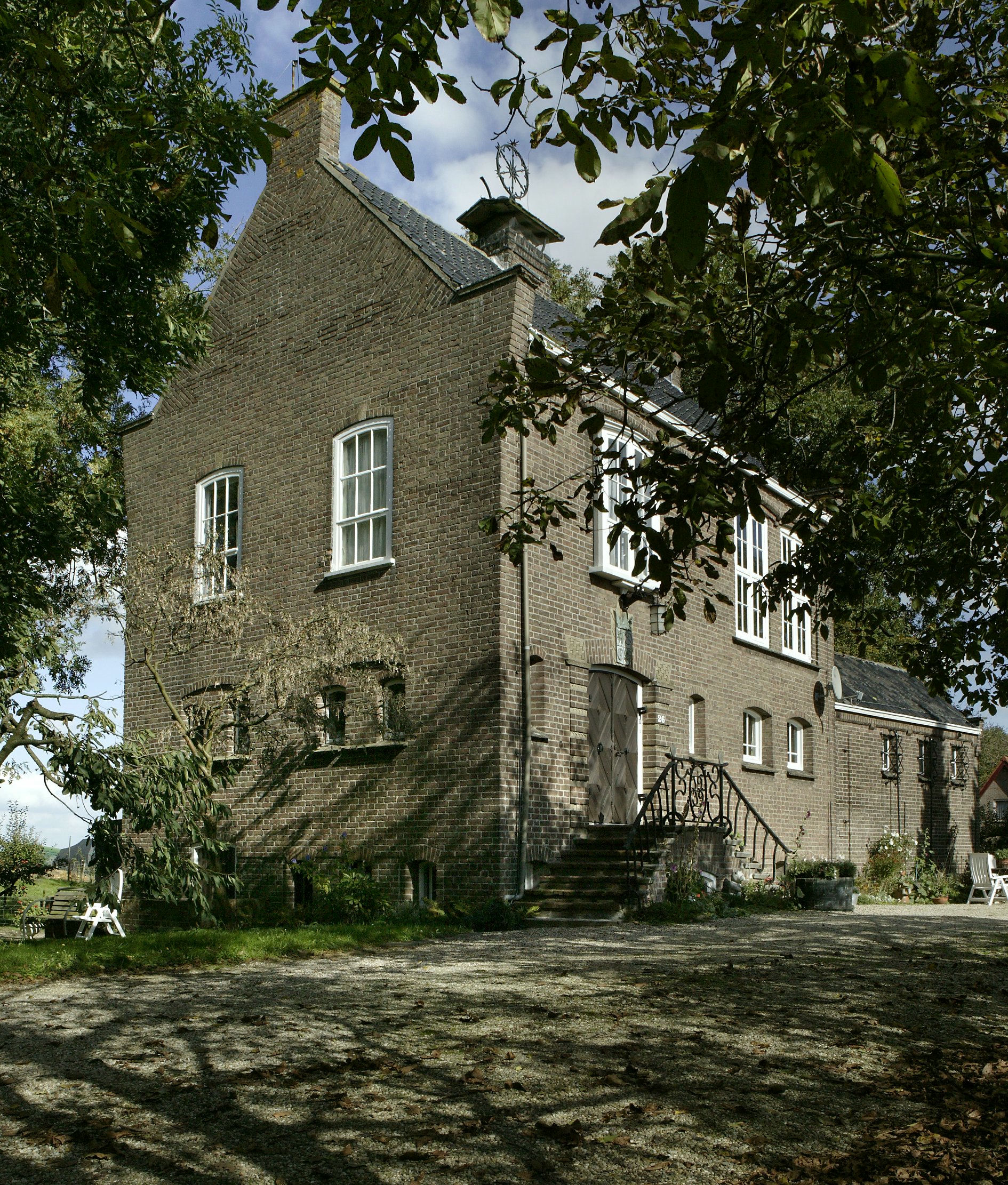
Former town hall
