= 2014 7-Dorpenomloop Aalburg =

2014 Rabobank 7-Dorpenomloop Aalburg
Race details
- Dates: 31 May 2014
- Stages: 1

The 2014 Rabobank 7-Dorpenomloop Aalburg is a one-day women's cycle race held in the Netherlands on 31 May 2014. The race had a UCI rating of 1.2.

== Results ==
| | Rider | Team | Time |
|---|---|---|---|
| 1 | Marianne Vos (NED) | Rabobank-Liv Woman Cycling Team | 2h 54' 45" |
| 2 | Lucy Garner (GBR) | Team Giant–Shimano | s.t. |
| 3 | Emma Johansson (SWE) | Orica–AIS | s.t. |
| 4 | Sara Mustonen (SWE) | Team Giant–Shimano | s.t. |
| 5 | Kim de Baat (NED) | Parkhotel Valkenburg | s.t. |
| 6 | Susanna Zorzi (ITA) | Astana BePink | s.t. |
| 7 | Nina Kessler (NED) | Boels–Dolmans | + 3" |
| 8 | Alice Marie Arzuffi (ITA) | Astana BePink | + 3" |
| 9 | Vera Koedooder (NED) | Bigla Cycling Team | + 3" |
| 10 | Lotte van Hoek (NED) | Hitec Products | + 3" |

== See also ==
- 2014 in women's road cycling
