= Alena Konečná =

Czech cyclist

Personal information
- Born: 27 May 1984 (age 42) Czech Republic

Cycling career
- Sport: Cycling
- Discipline: Road cycling

Alena Konečná (born 27 May 1984) is a road cyclist from Czech Republic. She represented her nation at the 2007 UCI Road World Championships. In 2008, she participated at the 2008 World University Cycling Championship in the women's road race.
