= 2014 Gent–Wevelgem (women's race) =

2014 Gent–Wevelgem Women's race
Race details
- Dates: 30 March 2014
- Stages: 1
- Distance: 115 km (71 mi)
- Winning time: 3h 02' 57"

Results
	Winner	Lauren Hall (USA)	(USA national team)
	Second	Janneke Ensing (NED)	(Boels–Dolmans)
	Third	Vera Koedooder (NED)	(Bigla Cycling Team)

The third women's race of Gent–Wevelgem was a one-day women's cycle race held in Belgium on 30 March 2014. The race was rated as an UCI rating of 1.2. The race was won by the American rider, Lauren Hall.

== Results ==
	Rider	Team	Time
1	Lauren Hall (USA)	USA (national team)	3h 02' 57"
2	Janneke Ensing (NED)	Boels–Dolmans	+ 1"
3	Vera Koedooder (NED)	Bigla Cycling Team	+ 1"
4	Sofie De Vuyst (BEL)	Futurumshop.nl–Zannata	+ 6"
5	Roxane Knetemann (NED)	Rabobank-Liv Woman Cycling Team	+ 6"
6	Anouska Koster (NED)	Futurumshop.nl–Zannata	+ 6"
7	Liesbet De Vocht (BEL)	Lotto–Belisol Ladies	+ 6"
8	Claire Thomas (GBR)	Velosport Pasta Montegrappa	+ 6"
9	Kirsten Wild (NED)	Netherlands (national team)	+ 1' 42"
10	Nina Kessler (NED)	Boels–Dolmans	+ 1' 42"

== See also ==
- 2014 in women's road cycling
