= Petra Grimbergen =

Dutch cyclist (born 1970)

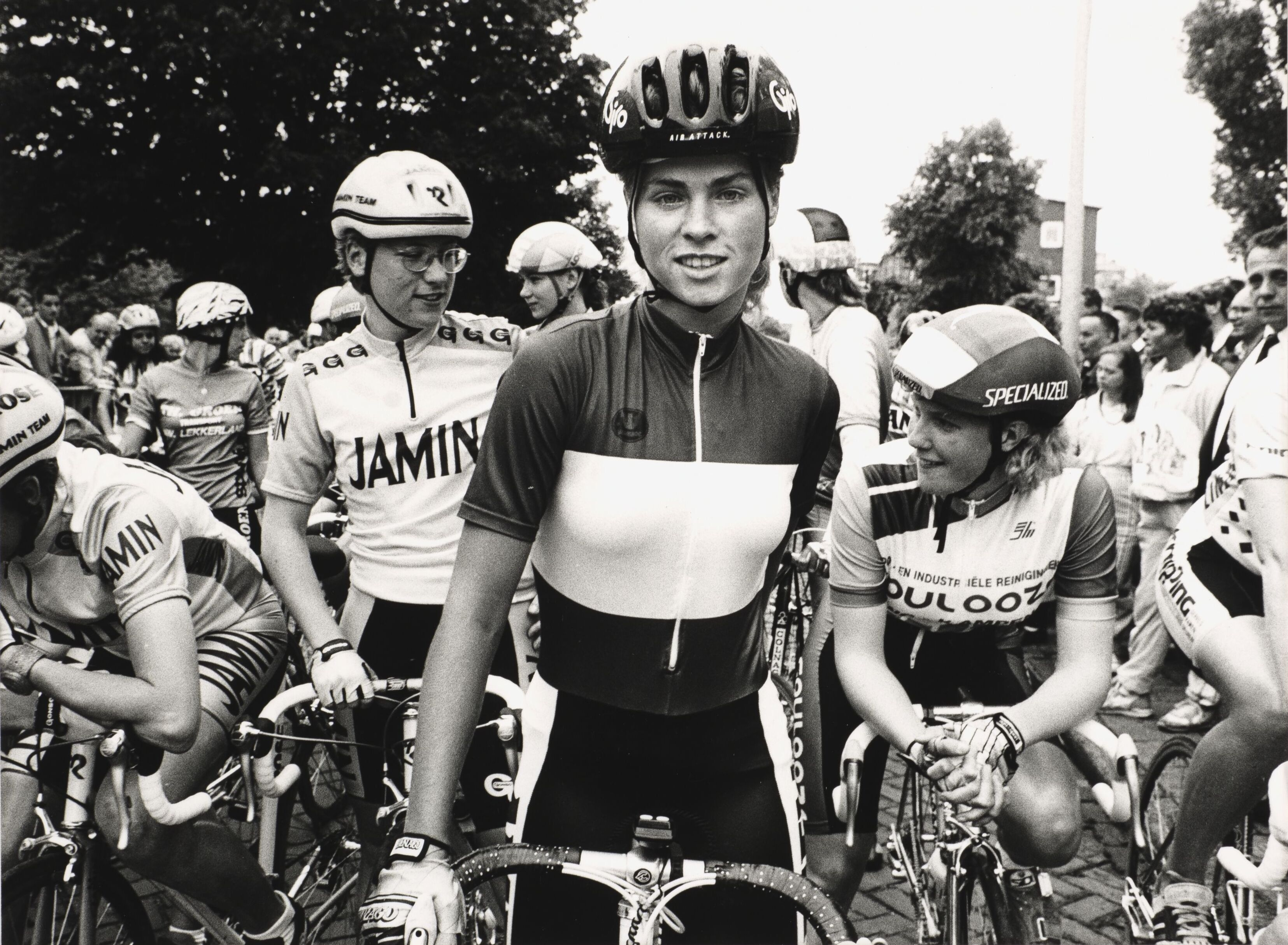
- Grimbergen (1991)

Personal information
- Born: 4 July 1970 (age 56) Rijnsburg, South Holland, Netherlands

Cycling career
- Sport: Cycling
- Disciplines: Road and track
- Role: Rider

Petra de Boer-Grimbergen (born 4 July 1970) is a former female road and track racing cyclist and speed skater from the Netherlands. She competed in the individual road race at the 1992 Summer Olympics and finished 29th.

Her older sister Jolanda Grimbergen was also a speed skater.

== Palmares ==
1990
Sprint, Dutch National Track Championships
2nd, Points race, Dutch National Track Championships
5th, Points race, 1990 UCI Track Cycling World Championships
1991
Points race, Dutch National Track Championships
Road race, Dutch National Road Race Championships
1992
2nd, Road race, Dutch National Road Race Championships
3rd, Points race, Dutch National Track Championships
3rd, Individual pursuit, Dutch National Track Championships
1993
3rd, Points race, Dutch National Track Championships
3rd, Individual pursuit, Dutch National Track Championships
Time trial, Dutch National Time Trial Championships

== See also ==
- List of Dutch Olympic cyclists
