= 2010 Dutch National Track Championships – Women's madison =

Women's madison
2010 Dutch National Track Championships

Race details
- Dates: October 16, 2010
- Stages: 1
- Distance: 20 km (12 mi)

Medalists
	Gold	Roxane Knetemann; Amy Pieters
	Silver	Ellen van Dijk; Vera Koedooder
	Bronze	Nina Kessler; Winanda Spoor

The women's madison at the 2010 Dutch National Track Championships took place at Sportpaleis Alkmaar in Alkmaar on October 16, 2010. Seven teams participated in the contest.

Roxane Knetemann & Amy Pieters won the gold medal, Ellen van Dijk & Vera Koedooder took silver and Nina Kessler & Winanda Spoor won the bronze.

== Preview ==
Several cyclist didn't participate because the competition took place early in the track cycling season and just after the road cycling season. Besides of that, two days after the competition the six day of Amsterdam started.

== Competition format ==
Because of the number of teams, there were no qualification rounds for this discipline. Consequently, the event was run direct to the final. The competition was shortened with 20 laps compared to 2009 and consisted on 80 laps, making a total of 20 km. The aim of the madison is to score as many points for intermediate sprints as well as for lapping the pack.

== Results ==
Rank	Name	Laps down	Points	Sprint 1	Sprint 2	Sprint 3	Sprint 4
1st place, gold medalist(s)	Roxane Knetemann; Amy Pieters	0	18	5	5	3	5
2nd place, silver medalist(s)	Ellen van Dijk; Vera Koedooder	0	12	2	3	5	2
3rd place, bronze medalist(s)	Nina Kessler; Winanda Spoor	0	4	1	1	1	1
4	Laura van der Kamp; Lotte van Hoek	0	2			2	
5	Claudia Koster; Ilona Meiring	0	0				
6	Silvie Haakman; Kelly Markus	1	6	3			3
7	Kim van Dijk; Samantha van Steenis	1	2	2			

Results from cyclebase.nl and verakoedooder.nl.
