= Dahlina Rosyida =

Indonesian cyclist (born 1983)

Personal information
- Born: 26 February 1983 (age 43) Indonesia

Cycling career
- Sport: Cycling
- Discipline: Road cycling

Dahlina Rosyida (born 26 February 1983) is a road cyclist from Indonesia. She represented her nation at the 2009 UCI Road World Championships.
