= Meeuwen, Netherlands =

Meeuwen
- Village
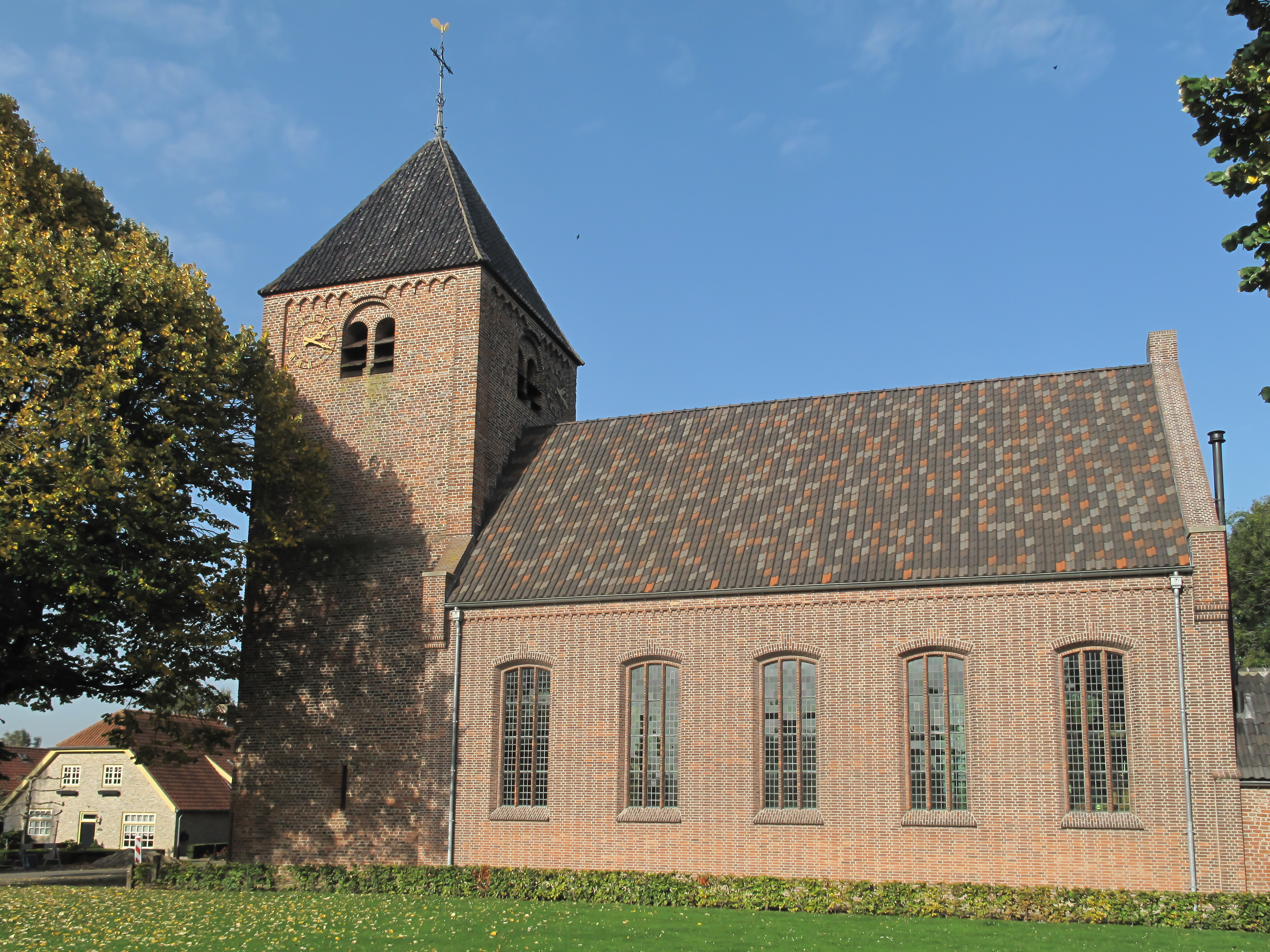
- Dutch Reformed church

- Coat of arms

- Location in the province of North Brabant in the Netherlands Meeuwen (Netherlands)
- Coordinates: 51°43′39″N 5°0′37″E
- Country: Netherlands
- Province: North Brabant
- Municipality: Altena

Area
  - Total: 4.73 km^{2} (1.83 sq mi)
- Elevation: 0.9 m (3.0 ft)

Population (2021)
  - Total: 715
  - Density: 151/km^{2} (392/sq mi)
- Time zone: UTC+1 (CET)
  - Summer (DST): UTC+2 (CEST)
- Postal code: 4268
- Dialing code: 0416

Meeuwen is a village in southern Netherlands. It is located in Altena, North Brabant, about 8 km northwest of Waalwijk.

== History ==
The village was first mentioned in 850 as Medua, and means "hay land". Meeuwen is a stretched village on the banks of the Bergse Maas. It was almost complete destroyed in the St. Elizabeth's flood of 1421, and later rebuilt.

The Dutch Reformed church was largely destroyed in 1944, and rebuilt in 1953. Huis te Meeuwen used to be a castle built before 1355. It was demolished in the 1840s and only the canal and foundations are still present. It was replaced an estate with tower which burnt down in 1936. The current building is farmhouse in Renaissance Revival style with a tower.

The grist mill De Witte Molen was built in 1740. It was damaged during World War II, and was restored, however it started to fall into disuse and was mainly used for storage. In 1987, it was moved because it was surrounded by industry and in 1993, the wind mill was restored to working order. It is occasionally used to grinding.

Meeuwen was home to 334 people in 1840. In November 1944, the village was evacuated and Meeuwen becomes the front-line between the German army and the Allies. One emergency house which was built after the war still exists, and has been moved next to the wind mill. Meeuwen was a separate municipality until 1923, when it became part of Aalburg. Until 1908, the official name of the municipality was Meeuwen, Hill en Babyloniënbroek. In 2019, it became part of Altena."

== Gallery ==
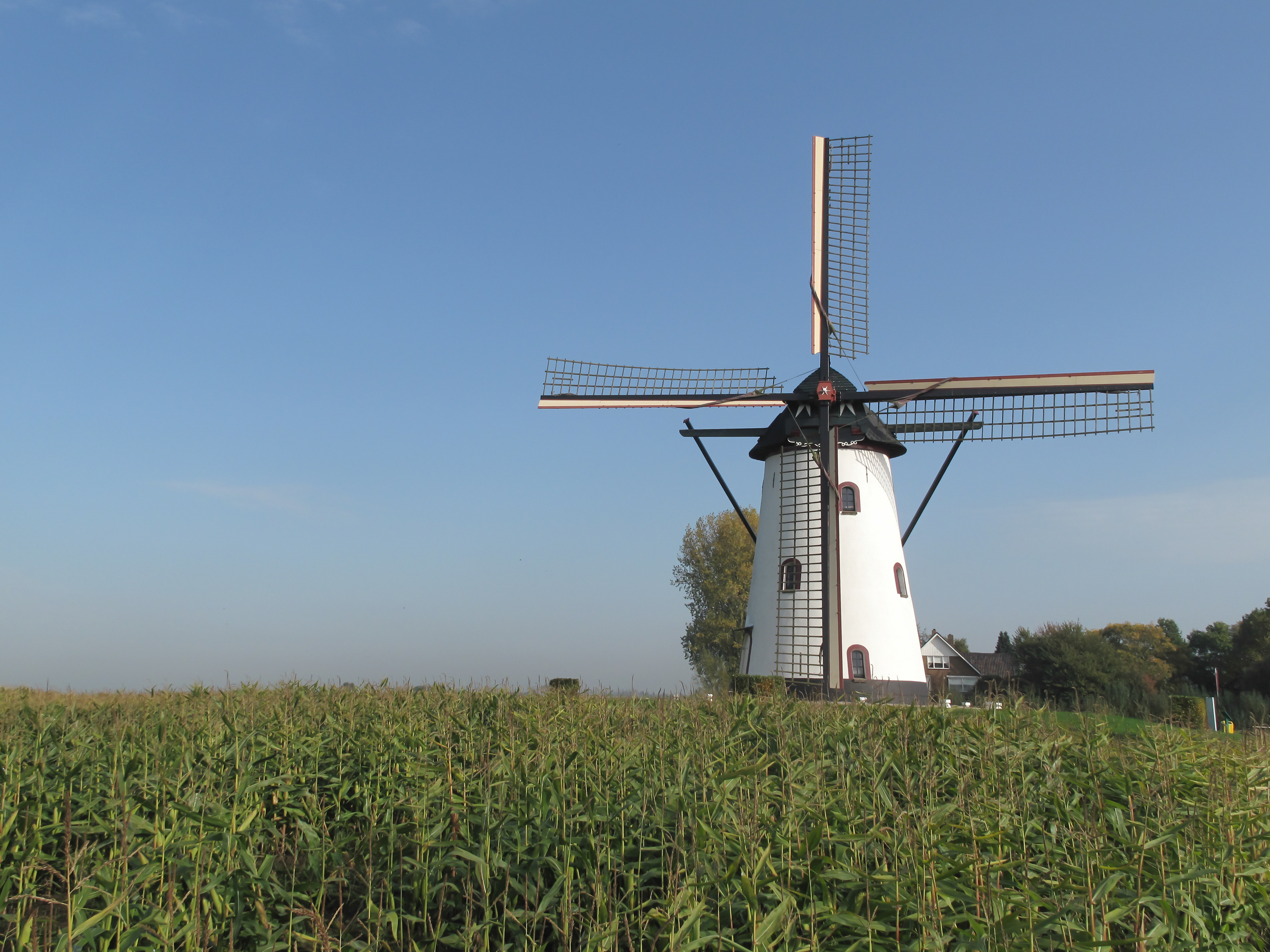
Windmill: de Witte Molen

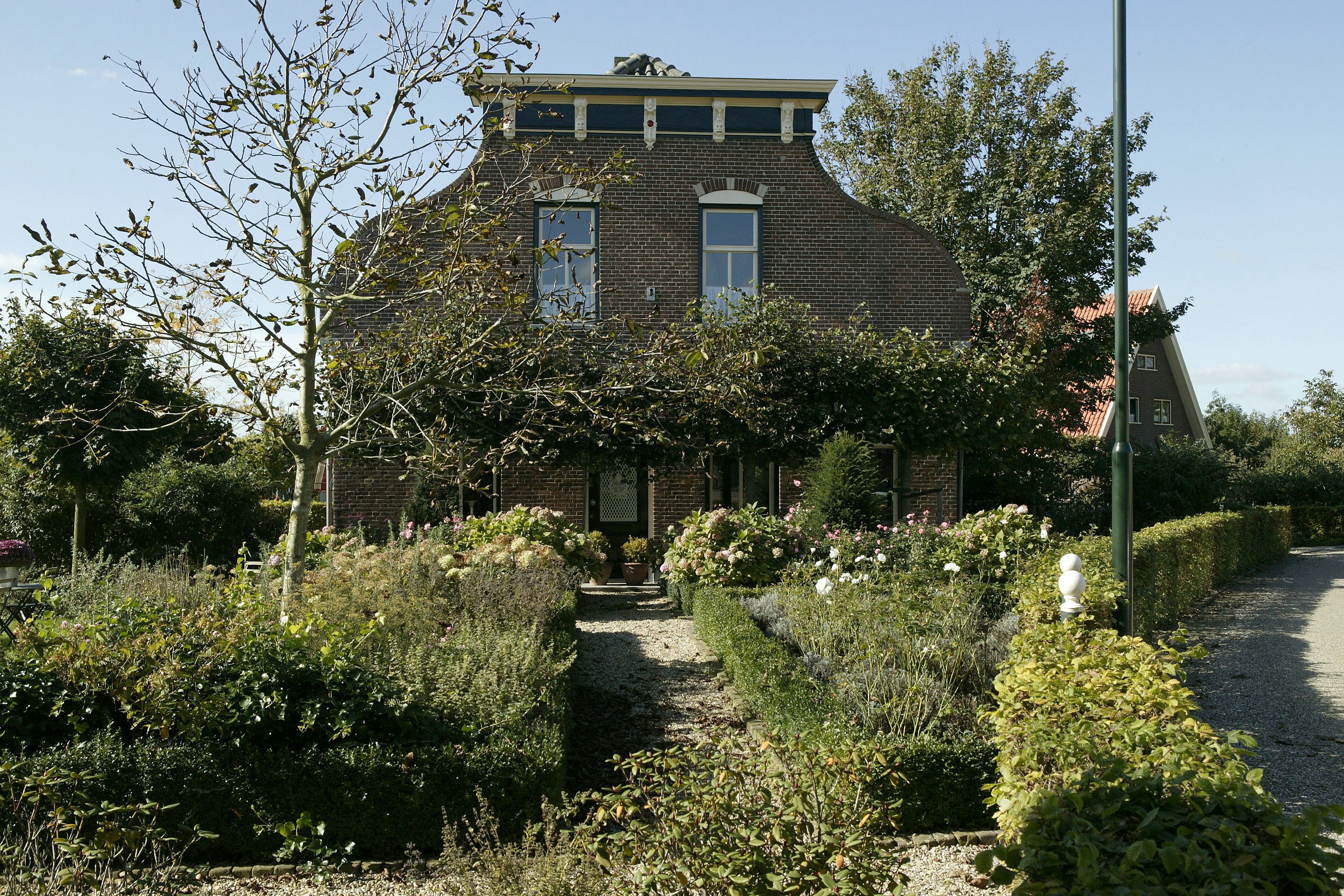
Farm in Meeuwen

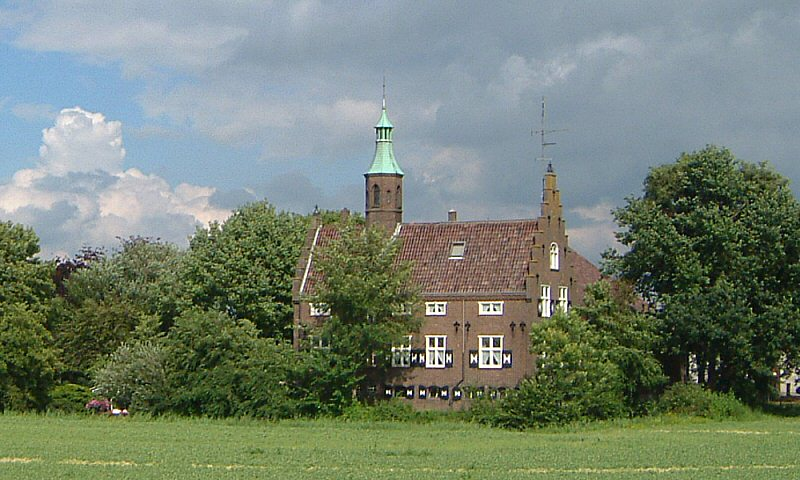
Castle Meeuwen

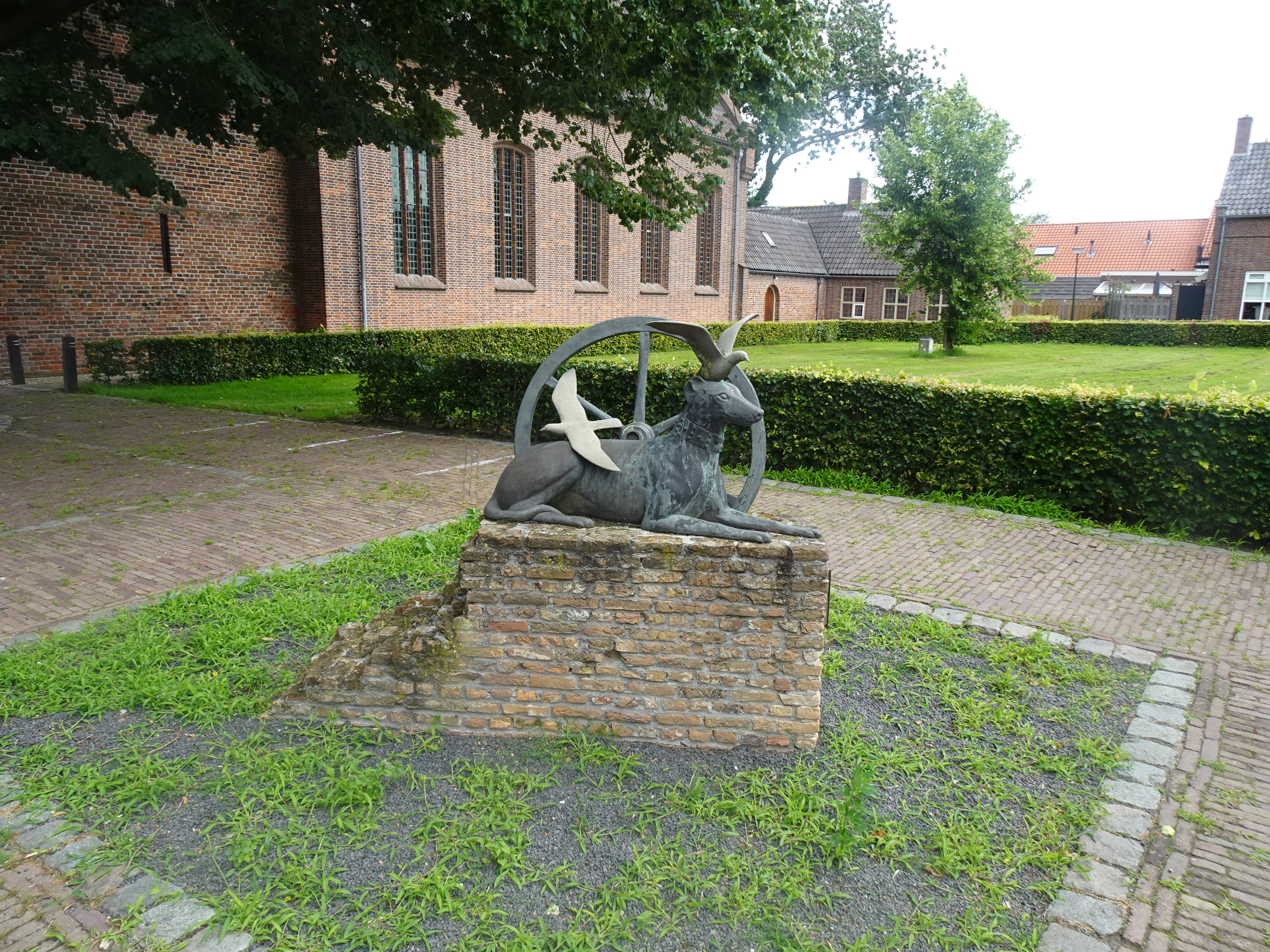
Medua sculpture in Meeuwen
