= Genderen =

- Village
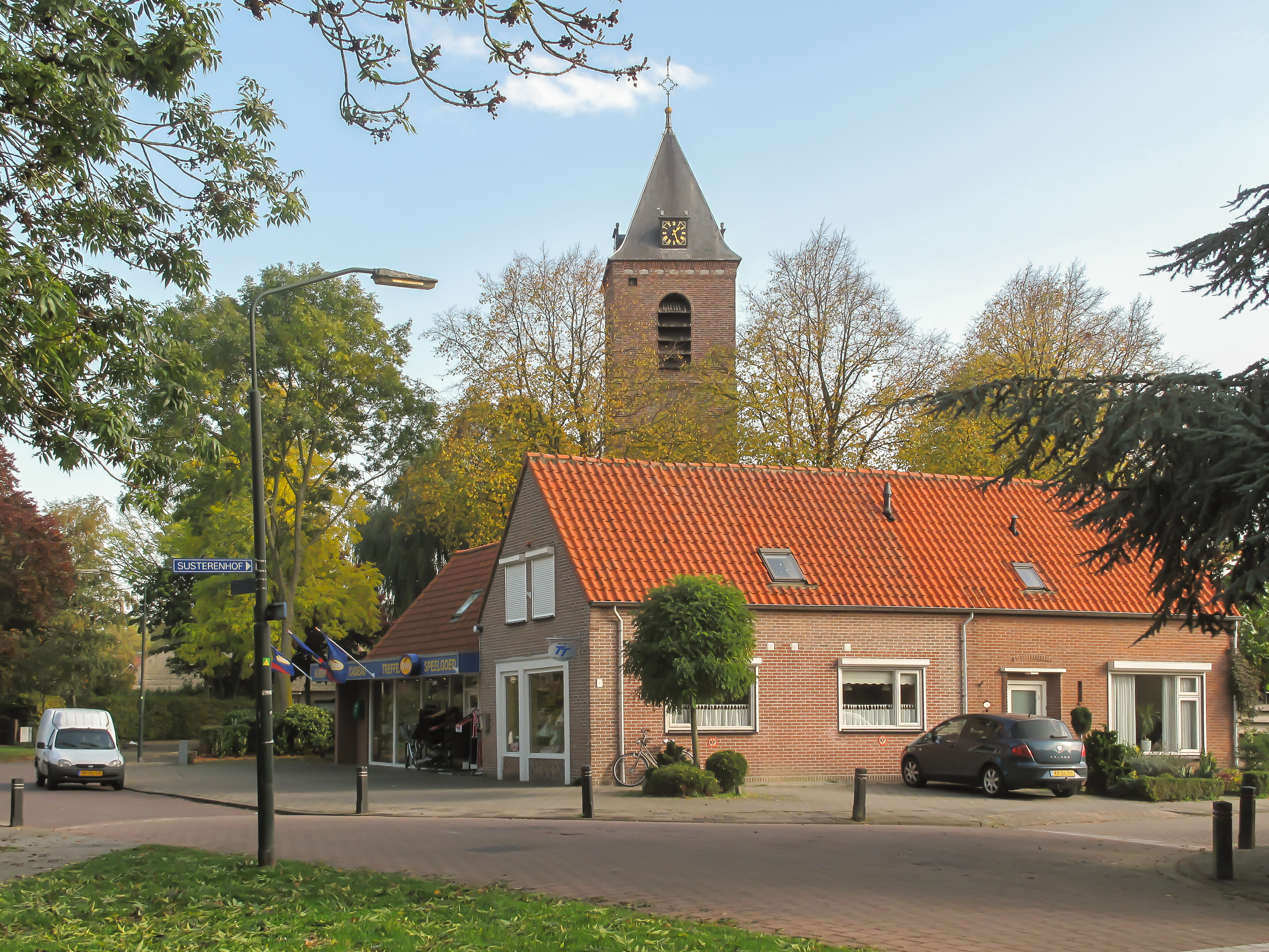
- Street view with church tower

- Coat of arms

- Location in the province of North Brabant in the Netherlands Genderen (Netherlands)
- Coordinates: 51°44′7″N 5°5′16″E
- Country: Netherlands
- Province: North Brabant
- Municipality: Altena

Area
  - Total: 6.38 km^{2} (2.46 sq mi)
- Elevation: 1.3 m (4.3 ft)

Population (2021)
  - Total: 1,725
  - Density: 270/km^{2} (700/sq mi)
- Time zone: UTC+1 (CET)
  - Summer (DST): UTC+2 (CEST)
- Postal code: 4265
- Dialing code: 0416

Genderen is a village in the Dutch province of North Brabant. It is located in the municipality of Altena.

The village was first mentioned in the late 11th century as Ganderon, and means "settlement on the Gander River". Genderen is a stretch-out village which developed in the Middle Ages along the Bergse Maas and was part of the Land van Altena.

The Dutch Reformed church dated from the 13th century, but was destroyed in 1944 during World War II. It was rebuilt in 1953, but the tower was constructed from the ruins of the medieval church.

Genderen was home to 499 people in 1840. Genderen was a separate municipality until 1923, when it was merged with Eethen. Before 1908, the name of the municipality was Heesbeen, Eethen en Genderen.

== Gallery ==
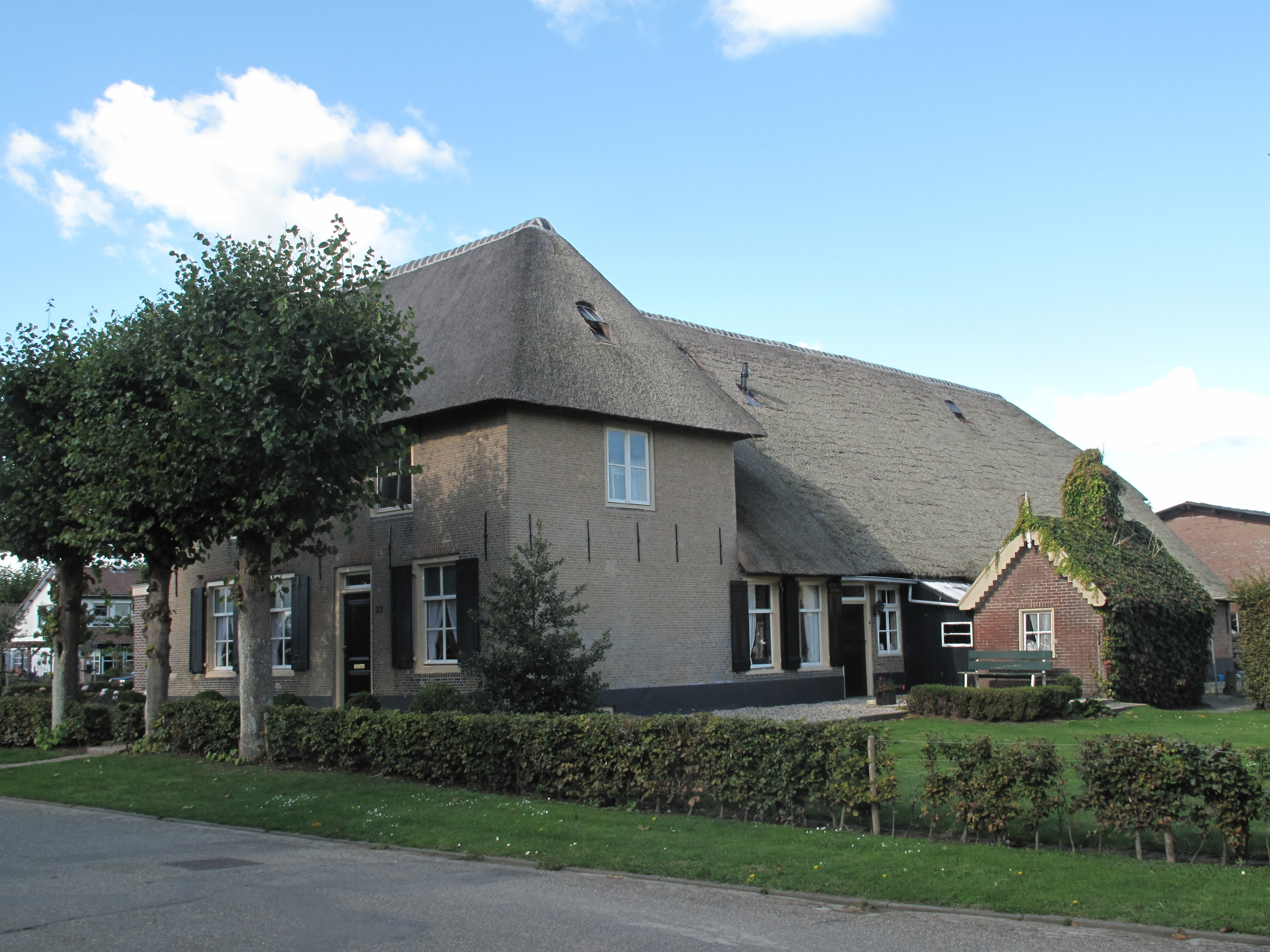
Farm in Genderen

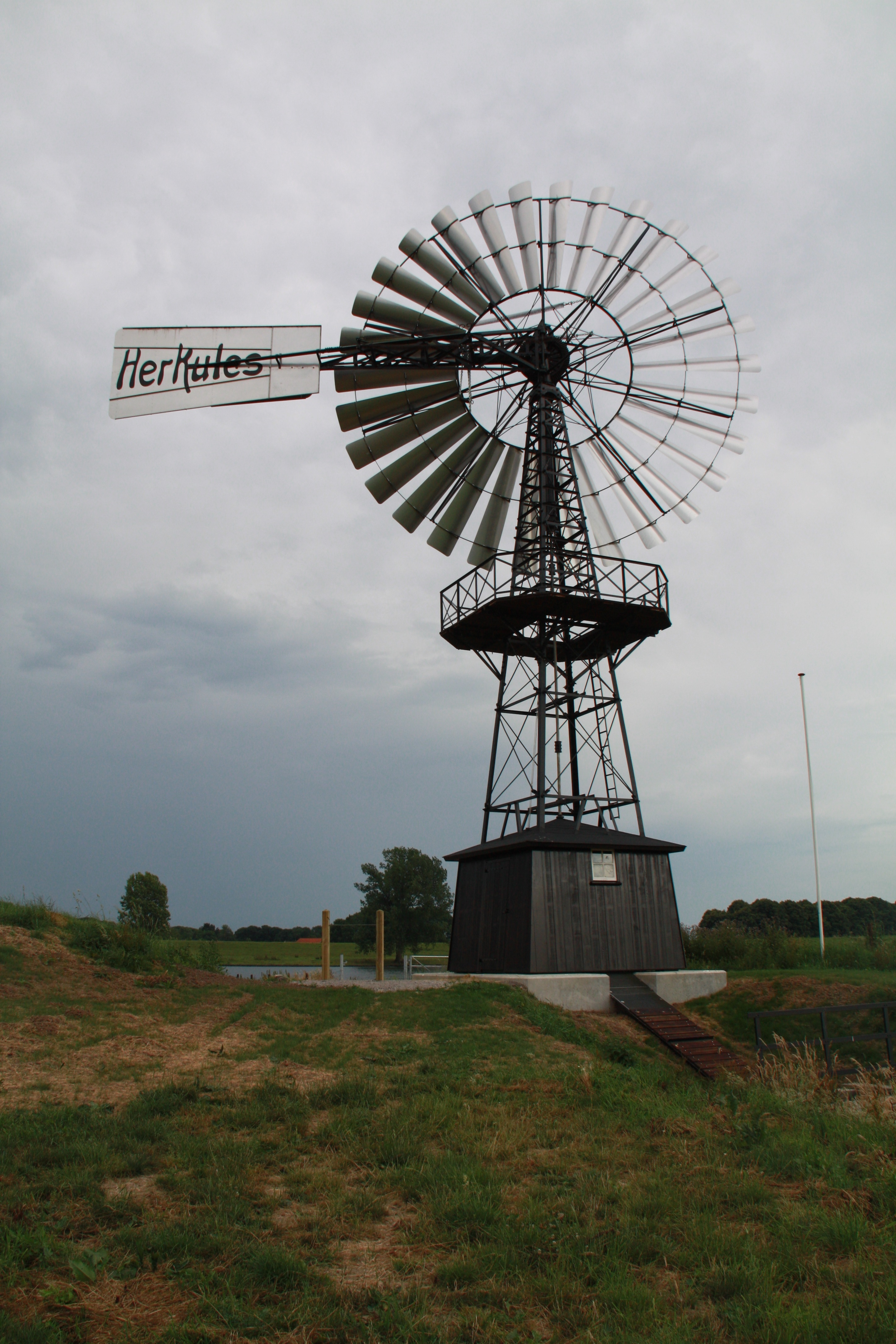
Polder mill Schrikmolen

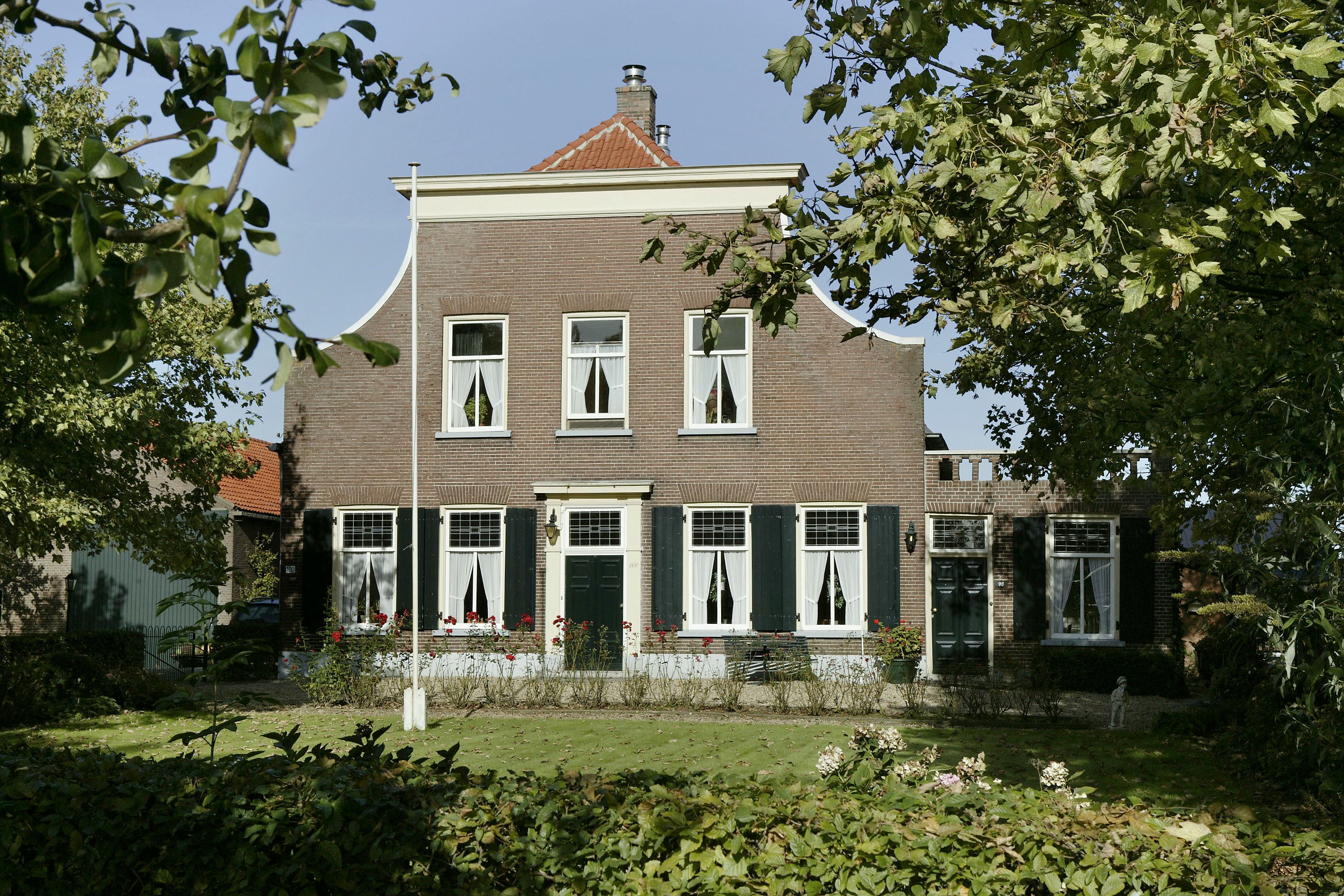
Farm in Genderen
