= Suzanne van Veen =

Dutch cyclist

Personal information
- Full name: Suzanne van Veen
- Born: 3 October 1987 (age 39) Naaldwijk, Netherlands

Cycling career
- Sport: Cycling
- Discipline: Track
- Role: Rider

Suzanne van Veen (born 3 October 1987) is a Dutch professional racing cyclist. Van Veen signed her first professional contract in 2005 when she became part of the Buitenpoort - Flexpoint Team. She still rides for the team, now known as Team Flexpoint.

Her first professional success came in 2006 in the national track championship in Alkmaar. She came second in the scratch race, behind Adrie Visser. During the Six-days of Rotterdam, van Veen and pacemaker Joop Zijlaard attacked with 17 laps to go in a women's derny race and lapped the field.

A year later she took part in the AA Drink Four-day of Rotterdam, an event similar to six-day racing. Van Veen rode with Elise van Hage. They achieved several top-three rankings and won the scratch race on the third day . They finished third overall.

== Career highlights ==
Dutch National Championships
2006 - 2nd, 2006 Dutch National Track Championships, scratch race

Four-day cycling events
2008 - Rotterdam, 3rd madison (with Elise van Hage)
2008 - Rotterdam, 2nd points race (with Elise van Hage)
2008 - Rotterdam, 3rd madison (with Elise van Hage)
2008 - Rotterdam, 3rd madison (with Elise van Hage)
2008 - Rotterdam, 1st scratch race (with Elise van Hage)
2008 - Rotterdam, 3rd overall (with Elise van Hage)

Other achievements
2007 - 1st, Rotterdam, Six Days, Grand Prix AA Drinks, derny

== See also ==
- 2006 Buitenpoort–Flexpoint Team season
- 2008 Team Flexpoint season
