= 2008 Dutch National Track Championships =

- Venue: Apeldoorn, the Netherlands
- Date: December 27–30, 2008
- Velodrome: Omnisport Apeldoorn

The 2008 Dutch National Track Championships were Dutch national Championship for track cycling. The competitions took place at Omnisport Apeldoorn in Apeldoorn, the Netherlands from December 27 to December 30. Competitions were held of various track cycling disciplines in different age, gender and disability categories.

== Medal summary ==
=== Elite ===
Event	Gold	Silver	Bronze
Men's Events
Men's sprint	Teun Mulder	Yondi Schmidt	Patrick Bos
Men's 1 km time trial	Teun Mulder	Yondi Schmidt	Tim Veldt
Men's keirin	Yondi Schmidt	Teun Mulder	Yorick Bos
Men's individual pursuit	Wim Stroetinga	Jens Mouris	Levi Heimans
Men's scratch	Wim Stroetinga	Raymond Kreder	Tim Veldt
Men's points race	Wim Stroetinga	Peter Schep	Jeff Vermeulen
Men's madison	Wim Stroetinga; Peter Schep	Michael Vingerling; Nick Stopler	Geertjan Jonkman; Arno van der Zwet
Women's Events
Women's sprint	Willy Kanis	Agnes Ronner	Lieke Klaus
Women's 500 m time trial	Willy Kanis	Agnes Ronner	Anneloes Stoelwinder
Women's keirin	Willy Kanis	Nina Kessler	Anneloes Stoelwinder
Women's individual pursuit	Ellen van Dijk	Kirsten Wild	Vera Koedooder
Women's scratch	Kirsten Wild	Ellen van Dijk	Elise van Hage
Women's points race	Vera Koedooder	Kirsten Wild	Nina Kessler

== See also ==
- 2008 in track cycling
