= 2007 Dutch National Track Championships =

- Venue: Alkmaar, the Netherlands
- Date(s): December 27–30, 2007
- Velodrome: Sportpaleis Alkmaar

The 2007 Dutch National Track Championships were the Dutch national Championship for track cycling. The competitions took place at Sportpaleis Alkmaar in Alkmaar, the Netherlands from December 27 to December 30. Competitions were held of various track cycling disciplines in different age, gender and disability categories.

== Medal summary ==
=== Elite ===
Event	Gold	Silver	Bronze
Men's Events
Men's sprint	Theo Bos	Teun Mulder	Tim Veldt
Men's 1 km time trial	Tim Veldt	Yondi Schmidt	Jens Mouris
Men's keirin	Theo Bos	Teun Mulder	Tim Veldt
Men's individual pursuit	Jenning Huizenga	Jens Mouris	Wim Stroetinga
Men's scratch	Niki Terpstra	Wim Stroetinga	Jeff Vermeulen
Men's points race	Pim Ligthart	Jeff Vermeulen	Wim Stroetinga
Men's madison	Wim Stroetinga; Niki Terpstra	Jens Mouris; Peter Schep	Jeff Vermeulen; Pim Ligthart
Women's Events
Women's sprint	Willy Kanis	Yvonne Hijgenaar	Anneloes Stoelwinder
Women's 500 m time trial	Yvonne Hijgenaar	Anneloes Stoelwinder	Agnes Ronner
Women's keirin	Willy Kanis	Yvonne Hijgenaar	Nina Kessler
Women's individual pursuit	Ellen van Dijk	Marianne Vos	Kirsten Wild
Women's scratch	Marianne Vos	Adrie Visser	Elise van Hage
Women's points race	Marianne Vos	Marlijn Binnendijk	Chantal Blaak

== See also ==
- 2007 in track cycling
