= 7-Dorpenomloop Aalburg =

Elite women's road bicycle race held in Aalburg, the Netherlands

Race details
- Date: May
- Region: Netherlands
- Discipline: Road
- Competition: KNWU Centric Topcompetitie
- Organiser: Stichting Wielerevenementen Aalburg
- Web site: www.wielerevenementenaalburg.nl

History
- First edition: 2007
- Editions: 12
- Final edition: 2018
- First winner: Marianne Vos (NED)
- Most wins: Marianne Vos (NED) (8 wins)
- Final winner: Lorena Wiebes (NED)

The 7-Dorpenomloop Aalburg (English: 7-villages circuit Aalburg; also known as the Rabobank 7-Dorpenomloop van Aalburg due to sponsorship reasons and the Dorpenomloop Wijk en Aalburg) was an elite women's road bicycle race held in and around Aalburg, the Netherlands. From 2011, the race was rated by the Union Cycliste Internationale (UCI) as a 1.2 category race. The race ended after its 2018 edition, due to financial issues.

== Past winners ==
Year	Country	Rider	Team
2007	Netherlands	Marianne Vos	Team DSB Bank
2008	Netherlands	Loes Markerink	
2009	Netherlands	Marianne Vos	DSB Bank - Nederland bloeit
2010	Netherlands	Marianne Vos	Nederland bloeit
2011	Netherlands	Marianne Vos	Nederland bloeit
2012	Netherlands	Annemiek van Vleuten	Rabobank Women Team
2013	Netherlands	Marianne Vos	Rabobank-Liv Giant
2014	Netherlands	Marianne Vos	Rabobank-Liv Woman Cycling Team
2015	Australia	Chloe Hosking	Wiggle–Honda
2016	Netherlands	Marianne Vos	Rabobank-Liv Woman Cycling Team
2017	Netherlands	Marianne Vos	WM3 Energie
2018	Netherlands	Lorena Wiebes	Parkhotel Valkenburg
