= Elise van Hage =

Dutch cyclist (born 1989)

Personal information
- Born: 6 April 1989 (age 37) Noordwijkerhout, Netherlands
Medal record
Women's road cycling
Representing the Netherlands
World University Cycling Championship
Gold medal – first place	2008 Nijmegen	Road race

Elise van Hage (born 6 April 1989 in Noordwijkerhout) is a Dutch professional racing cyclist.

== Career wins ==
2004 - Dutch National Road Race Championships, Novices, The Netherlands (F) (NED)
2005 - Dutch National Road Race Championships, Novices, The Netherlands (F) (NED)
2005 - Dutch National Track Championships, Sprint, Juniors, The Netherlands (F) (NED)
2005 - Dutch National Track Championships, 500 m, Juniors, The Netherlands (F) (NED)
2005 - Dutch National Track Championships, Scratch, Juniors, The Netherlands (F) (NED)
2005 - Dutch National Track Championships, Keirin, Juniors, The Netherlands (F) (NED)
2006 - European Championship, Track, Points race, Juniors (F), Athens
2006 - European Championship, Track, Scratch, Juniors (F), Athens
2006 - World Championship, Track, Scratch, Juniors (F), Gent
2006 - 2006 Dutch National Track Championships, 500 m, Juniors, The Netherlands (F), Alkmaar (NED)
2006 - 2006 Dutch National Track Championships, Scratch, Juniors, The Netherlands (F), Alkmaar (NED)
2006 - 2006 Dutch National Track Championships, Points race, Juniors, The Netherlands (F), Alkmaar (NED)
2007 - Dutch National Road Race Championships, Juniors, The Netherlands (F) (NED)
2007 - 3rd place, Scratch race, 2007 Dutch National Track Championships
2008 (Team Flexpoint)
2008 - World University Cycling Championship, Road Race
2008 - Scratch race, 2008 Dutch National Track Championships
2010 - 3rd place, Dutch National Team Time Trial Championships (together with Aafke Eshuis and Nathalie van Gogh)

== National record, team pursuit ==
After the introduction of the women's 3000m team pursuit at the 2007–08 track cycling season, Van Hage was once part of the team pursuit squad when they established a new Dutch national record. She is not the record holder anymore.

Time	Speed (km/h)	Cyclists	Event	Location of race	Date	Ref
3:31.596	51.040	Ellen van Dijk; Marlijn Binnendijk; Elise van Hage	2008 UCI Track Cycling World Championships (Qualifying)	(United Kingdom) Manchester	28 March 2008	
