= Marlijn Binnendijk =

Dutch cyclist

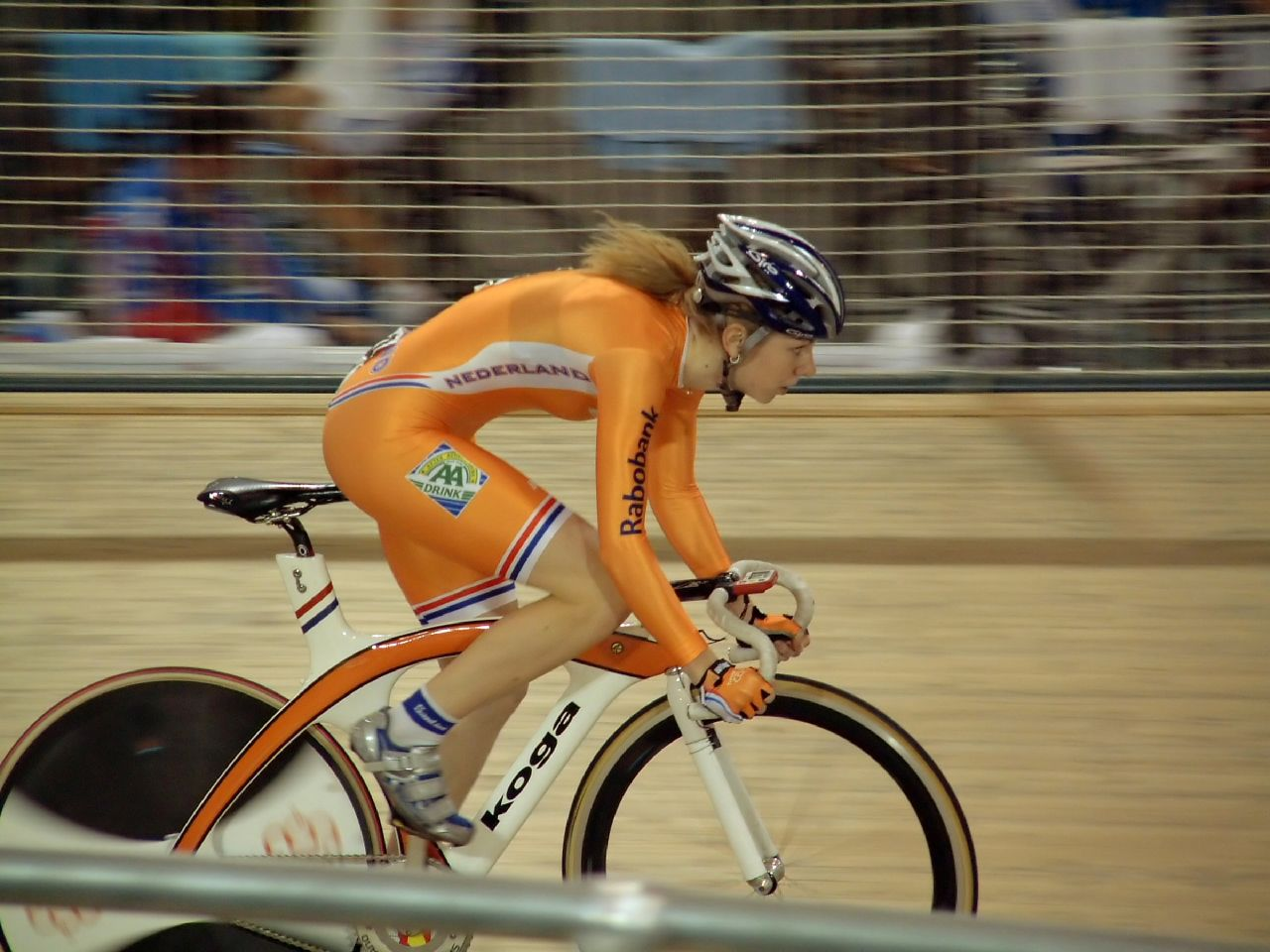
- Binnendijk during a World Cup Scratch race qualifier

Personal information
- Full name: Marlijn Binnendijk
- Born: 12 May 1986 (age 40) Zuid-Scharwoude, the Netherlands

Cycling career
- Sport: Cycling
- Disciplines: Track and road
- Role: Rider

Professional team
- 2005–2010: AA Drink–leontien.nl

Marlijn Binnendijk (born 12 May 1986 in Zuid-Scharwoude) is a Dutch professional racing cyclist.

== Palmarès ==
Date	Placing	Event	Competition	Location	Country
30 July 2004	1st place, gold medalist(s)	Individual pursuit	Junior Coupe du Monde	Los Angeles	United States
19 February 2005	1	Individual pursuit	Track Cycling World Cup	Sydney	Australia
28 December 2006	3rd place, bronze medalist(s)	Scratch race	2006 Dutch National Track Championships	Alkmaar	Netherlands
30 December 2006	2nd place, silver medalist(s)	Points race	2006 Dutch National Track Championships	Alkmaar	Netherlands
30 December 2006	2nd place, silver medalist(s)	Individual pursuit	2006 Dutch National Track Championships	Alkmaar	Netherlands
13 June 2007	1st place, gold medalist(s)	Road race	National road cycling championships	Maastricht	Netherlands
30 December 2007	2nd place, silver medalist(s)	Points race	2007 Dutch National Track Championships	Alkmaar	Netherlands
17 February 2008	2	Team pursuit (Note: The other riders on the squad were Yvonne Hijgenaar and Ellen van Dijk.)	Track Cycling World Cup	Ballerup	Denmark

== National record, team pursuit ==
After the introduction of the women's 3000m team pursuit at the 2007–08 track cycling season, Binnendijk was three times part of the team pursuit squad when they established a (new) Dutch national record. The first one was the first time the Dutch team rode the team pursuit. She is not the record holder anymore.

Time	Speed (km/h)	Cyclists	Event	Location of race	Date	Ref
3:36.901	49.792	Ellen van Dijk; Marlijn Binnendijk; Yvonne Hijgenaar	2007–08 UCI Track Cycling World Cup Classics – Round 4 (Qualification)	(Denmark) Copenhagen	17 February 2008	
3:32.666	50.783	Ellen van Dijk; Marlijn Binnendijk; Yvonne Hijgenaar	2007–08 UCI Track Cycling World Cup Classics – Round 4 (Gold medal race)	(Denmark) Copenhagen	17 February 2008	
3:31.596	51.040	Ellen van Dijk; Marlijn Binnendijk; Elise van Hage	2008 UCI Track Cycling World Championships (Qualifying)	(United Kingdom) Manchester	28 March 2008	

== See also ==
- 2008 AA-Drink Cycling Team season
