= 2006 Dutch National Track Championships =

- Venue: Alkmaar, the Netherlands
- Date(s): December 28–30, 2006
- Velodrome: Sportpaleis Alkmaar

The 2006 Dutch National Track Championships were the Dutch national Championship for track cycling. The competitions took place at Sportpaleis Alkmaar in Alkmaar, the Netherlands from December 28 to December 30. Competitions were held of various track cycling disciplines in different age, gender and disability categories.

== Medal summary ==
=== Elite ===
Event	Gold	Silver	Bronze
Men's Events
Men's sprint	Theo Bos	Teun Mulder	Tim Veldt
Men's 1 km time trial	Tim Veldt	Yondi Schmidt	Patrick Bos
Men's keirin	Theo Bos	Teun Mulder	Patrick Bos
Men's individual pursuit	Niki Terpstra	Eelke van der Wal	Jenning Huizenga
Men's scratch	Wim Stroetinga	Hans Dekkers	Dennis Smit
Men's points race	Pim Ligthart	Arno van der Zwet	Sander Lormans
Men's madison	Wim Stroetinga; Niki Terpstra	Pim Ligthart; Jeff Vermeulen	Kenny van Hummel; Aart Vierhouten
Women's Events
Women's sprint	Willy Kanis	Sigrid Jochems	Yvonne Baltus
Women's 500 m time trial	Willy Kanis	Lianne Wagtho	Sigrid Jochems
Women's keirin	Willy Kanis	Nina Kessler	Yvonne Baltus
Women's individual pursuit	Vera Koedooder	Marlijn Binnendijk	Ellen van Dijk
Women's scratch	Adrie Visser	Suzanne van Veen	Marlijn Binnendijk
Women's points race	Adrie Visser	Marlijn Binnendijk	Vera Koedooder
