= Vera Koedooder =

Dutch cyclist (born 1983)

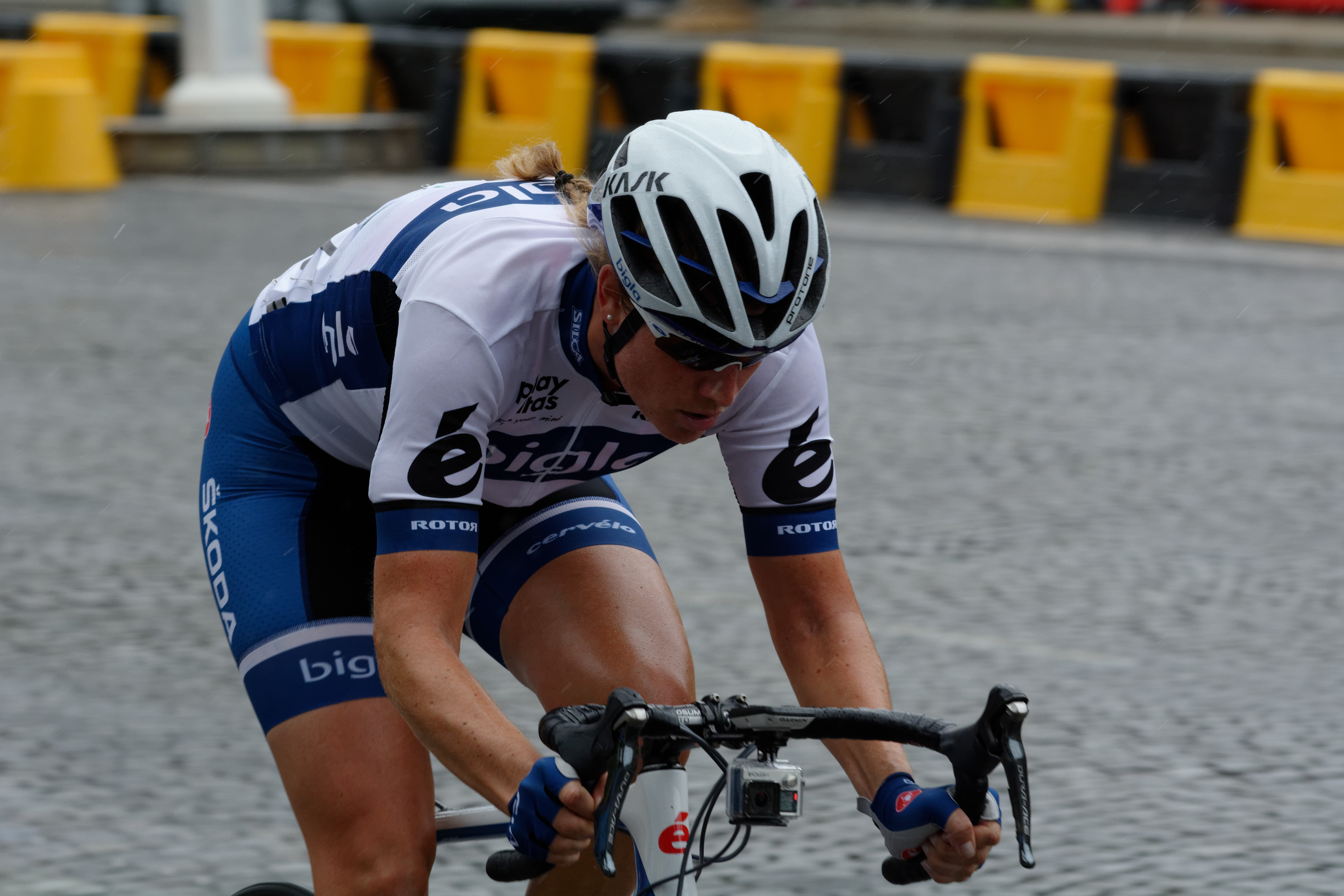
- Koedooder at the 2015 La Course by Le Tour de France

Personal information
- Full name: Divera Maria Koedooder
- Born: 31 October 1983 (age 42) Hoorn, Netherlands
- Height: 1.83 m (6 ft 0 in)

Cycling career
- Sport: Cycling
- Current team: Retired
- Disciplines: Road; Track
- Role: Rider

Amateur teams
- 2010: Batavus Ladies Cycling Team
- 2011: Team Specialized-DPD pakket service

Professional teams
- 2002: Rabobank Dutch National Team -23
- 2003: Bik–Powerplate
- 2004: Vrienden van het Platteland
- 2005–2006: Buitenpoort - Flexpoint Team
- 2007: Team DSB Bank
- 2008–2009: Lotto–Belisol Ladiesteam
- 2012–2013: Sengers Ladies Cycling Team
- 2014–2015: Bigla Cycling Team
- 2016: Parkhotel Valkenburg Continental Team

Divera Maria Koedooder (born 31 October 1983) is a Dutch former professional racing cyclist.

Born in Hoorn, Koedooder was a member of the Dutch team that finished sixth at the 2012 Summer Olympics in the team pursuit (together with Ellen van Dijk, Kirsten Wild and Amy Pieters).

== Career achievements ==
=== Major results ===
==== Road ====
2000
1st Time trial, National Junior Road Championships
2001
1st Time trial, National Junior Road Championships
8th Road race, UCI Junior Road World Championships
2002
1st Stage 3 GP Boekel
3rd Time trial, National Road Championships
3rd Grand Prix de Dottignies
10th Overall Holland Ladies Tour
2003
1st Flevotour
3rd Road race, UEC European Under-23 Road Championships
3rd Ronde van Gelderland
2005
1st Flevotour
2006
1st Brasschaat/Maria-ter-Heide 1000 euro Race
2nd Omloop van Borsele
2007
1st Parel van de Veluwe
2008
3rd Holland Hills Classic
7th Overall Ster Zeeuwsche Eilanden
7th Omloop van Borsele
2009
6th Chrono Champenois
8th Overall Ster Zeeuwsche Eilanden
2010
4th Overall Tour de Feminin-O cenu Českého Švýcarska
5th Overall Ster Zeeuwsche Eilanden
7th Holland Hills Classic
2011
4th Overall Ster Zeeuwsche Eilanden
8th Omloop van Borsele
2012
1st Stage 2 (TTT) Trophée d'Or Féminin
5th Overall Tour de Feminin-O cenu Českého Švýcarska
8th Overall Ster Zeeuwsche Eilanden
2013
1st Team time trial, National Road Championships (with Aafke Eshuis, Julia Soek and Ilona Hoeksma)
1st Ronde van Barendrecht
1st Kermisronde van Bergeijk
1st Grand Prix de Dottignies
1st EPZ Omloop van Borsele
2nd Profronde van Stiphout
2nd Parel van de Veluwe
3rd Draai van de Kaai
8th 7-Dorpenomloop Aalburg
10th Overall Tour de Bretagne Féminin

1st Stage 2 (ITT)

2014
2nd Overall Energiewacht Tour

1st Stage 3a

2nd Nagrada Ljubljane TT
3rd Overall Tour de Feminin-O cenu Českého Švýcarska
3rd Gent–Wevelgem
7th Overall BeNe Ladies Tour
9th 7-Dorpenomloop Aalburg
2015
2nd Parel van de Veluwe
2016
2nd Omloop van de IJsseldelta

==== Track ====
2000
1st Points race, UCI Junior Track Cycling World Championships
2001
1st Individual pursuit, UCI Juniors Track World Championships
2002
1st Points race, UEC European Under-23 Track Championships
2003
UCI Track Cycling World Cup Classics, Aguascalientes

2nd Team sprint
3rd Points race

3rd Scratch, National Track Championships
2004
3rd Scratch, National Track Championships
2006
1st Scratch, 2006–07 UCI Track Cycling World Cup Classics, Sydney
National Track Championships

1st Individual pursuit
3rd Points race

1st Individual pursuit, National Junior Track Championships
2008
National Track Championships

1st Points race
3rd Individual pursuit

2009
National Track Championships

1st Madison (with Kirsten Wild)
2nd Individual pursuit

2008–09 UCI Track Cycling World Cup Classics, Copenhagen

2nd Scratch
2nd Team pursuit

3rd Individual pursuit, 2009–10 UCI Track Cycling World Cup Classics, Manchester
2010
1st Scratch, 2009–10 UCI Track Cycling World Cup Classics, Beijing
National Track Championships

2nd Omnium
2nd Madison (with Ellen van Dijk)
3rd Individual pursuit

2011
3rd Madison, National Track Championships (with Winanda Spoor)
2012
3rd Points race, National Track Championships
6th Team pursuit, Olympic Games (with Ellen van Dijk, Amy Pieters and Kirsten Wild)
2015
National Track Championships

1st Points race
3rd Madison (with Roxane Knetemann)

=== National records ===
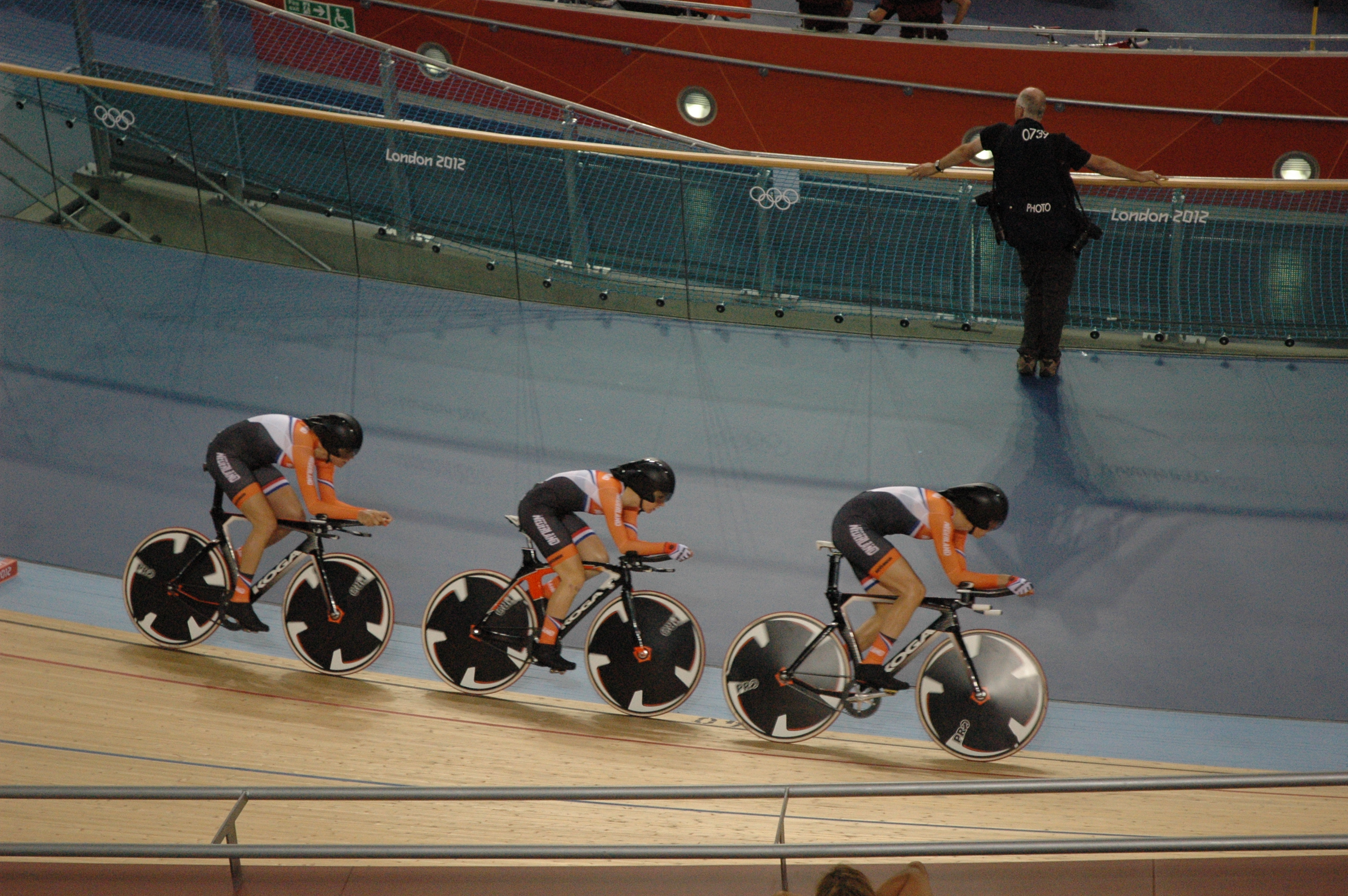
Vera Koedooder (right) together with Ellen van Dijk and Kirsten Wild at the 2012 Summer Olympics.

Koedooder was six times part of the 3000 m team pursuit squad when they established a new Dutch national record. She is together with Ellen van Dijk and Kirsten Wild the current national record holder, with a time of 3:20.013, at an average speed of 53.996 kilometres per hour (33.552 miles per hour), established at the 2012 Summer Olympics on 4 August 2012.

Time	Speed (km/h)	Cyclists	Event	Location of race	Date	Ref
3:31.045	51.250	Ellen van Dijk; Amy Pieters; Vera Koedooder	2008–09 UCI Track Cycling World Cup Classics – Round 5 (Qualification)	(Denmark) Copenhagen	15 February 2009	
3:29.730	51.494	Ellen van Dijk; Amy Pieters; Vera Koedooder	2008–09 UCI Track Cycling World Cup Classics – Round 5 (gold medal race)	(Denmark) Copenhagen	15 February 2009	
3:29.379	51.581	Ellen van Dijk; Amy Pieters; Vera Koedooder	2009 UCI Track Cycling World Championships (bronze medal race)	(Poland) Pruszków	26 March 2009	
3:25.156	52.642	Ellen van Dijk; Amy Pieters; Vera Koedooder	2010 UCI Track Cycling World Championships (Qualifying)	(Denmark) Ballerup	25 March 2010	
3:23.179	53.155	Ellen van Dijk; Kirsten Wild; Vera Koedooder	2010–11 UCI Track Cycling World Cup Classics – Round 4 (Qualifying)	(United Kingdom) Manchester	18 February 2011	
3:20.013	53.996	Ellen van Dijk; Kirsten Wild; Vera Koedooder	2012 Summer Olympics (first round)	(United Kingdom) London	4 August 2012	

== See also ==
- List of Dutch Olympic cyclists
