= Nina Kessler =

Dutch cyclist (born 1988)

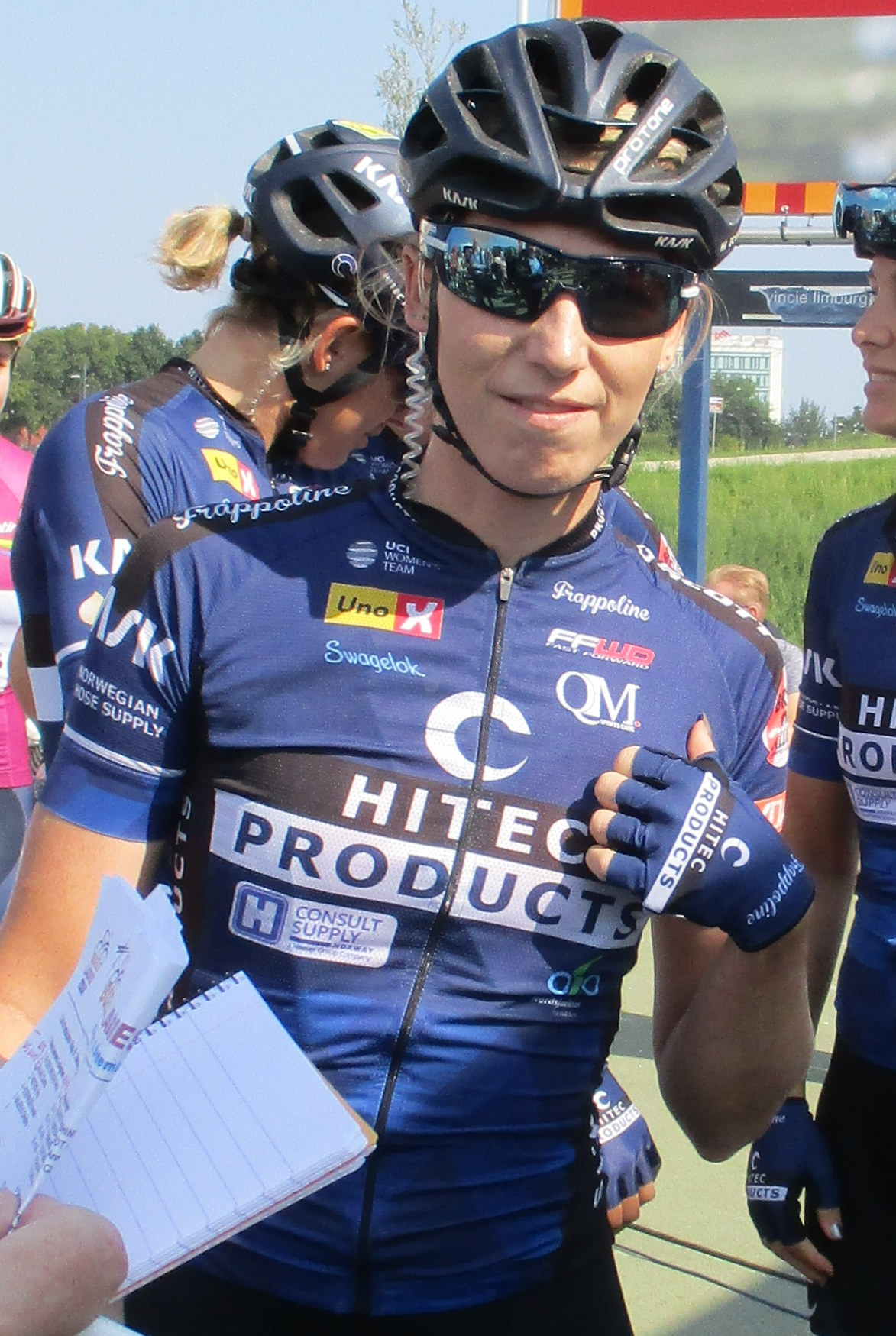
- Kessler in 2017

Personal information
- Full name: Nina Kessler
- Born: 4 July 1988 (age 38) Breukelen, Netherlands

Cycling career
- Sport: Cycling
- Current team: EF Education–Oatly
- Disciplines: Road; Track; Mountain biking
- Role: Rider
- Rider type: All-rounder

Professional teams
- 2010–2014: Dolmans Landscaping Team
- 2015–2016: Lensworld.eu–Zannata
- 2017–2018: Team Hitec Products
- 2019–2021: Tibco–Silicon Valley Bank
- 2022–2023: Team BikeExchange–Jayco
- 2024–: EF Education–Cannondale
Medal record
Representing Netherlands
Women's track cycling
European Championships
Bronze medal – third place	2016 Yvelines	Madison

Nina Kessler (born 4 July 1988) is a Dutch racing cyclist, who currently rides for UCI Women's Continental Team EF Education–Oatly. She competed in the 2013 UCI women's team time trial in Florence. At the 2015 Dutch National Track Championships she became Dutch champion in the women's Madison together with Kirsten Wild. She won the points classification at the 2016 La Course by Le Tour de France.

== Major results ==
=== Track ===
2006
2nd Keirin, National Track Championships
2007
3rd Keirin, National Track Championships
2008
National Track Championships

2nd Keirin
3rd Points race

2010
National Track Championships

3rd Keirin
3rd Madison (with Winanda Spoor)

2014
National Track Championships

2nd Madison (with Nicky Zijlaard)
3rd Points race

2015
1st Madison, National Track Championships (with Kirsten Wild)
2016
National Track Championships

1st Omnium
1st Madison (with Kirsten Wild)

3rd Madison, UEC European Track Championships (with Kirsten Wild)
2017
1st Madison, National Track Championships (with Kirsten Wild)

=== Road ===
2012
7th Overall Belgium Tour
2013
5th EPZ Omloop van Borsele
10th 7-Dorpenomloop Aalburg
2014
3rd Ronde van Overijssel
4th Erondegemse Pijl
7th 7-Dorpenomloop Aalburg
8th Grand Prix de Dottignies
9th Ronde van Gelderland
9th EPZ Omloop van Borsele
9th Dwars door de Westhoek
9th Diamond Tour
10th Overall BeNe Ladies Tour
10th Gent–Wevelgem
2015
2nd Road race, South Holland Provincial Road Championships
3rd Erondegemse Pijl
4th Omloop van de IJsseldelta
2016
2nd Erondegemse Pijl
2nd RideLondon Classique
4th Omloop van Borsele
6th Ronde van Gelderland
7th 7-Dorpenomloop Aalburg
8th Overall BeNe Ladies Tour

1st Stage 2a

2017
1st Flanders Diamond Tour
4th Omloop van de IJsseldelta
5th Erondegemse Pijl
6th Telkom 947 Cycle Challenge
6th Omloop van Borsele
6th Drentse Acht van Westerveld
2018
1st Erondegemse Pijl
1st Stage 1 Rás na mBan
5th Overall The Princess Maha Chackri Sirindhorn's Cup "Women's Tour of Thailand"
5th 7-Dorpenomloop Aalburg
6th Omloop Het Nieuwsblad
6th Flanders Ladies Classic
7th Le Samyn des Dames
7th Veenendaal–Veenendaal Classic
8th Flanders Diamond Tour
9th Overall Tour of Zhoushan Island
2019
4th Overall Tour of Chongming Island

1st Mountains classification

2021
10th Ronde van Drenthe
2022
3rd Omloop der Kempen
8th Ronde van Drenthe

=== Mountain biking ===
2014
3rd Beach race, National Mountain Bike Championships
2015
2nd Beach race, National Mountain Bike Championships
2019
1st Beach race, UEC European Mountain Bike Championships
2020
2nd Beach race, National Mountain Bike Championships
2022
1st Beach race, National Mountain Bike Championships
2023
1st Beach race, National Mountain Bike Championships
