= Adrie Visser =

Dutch cyclist (born 1983)

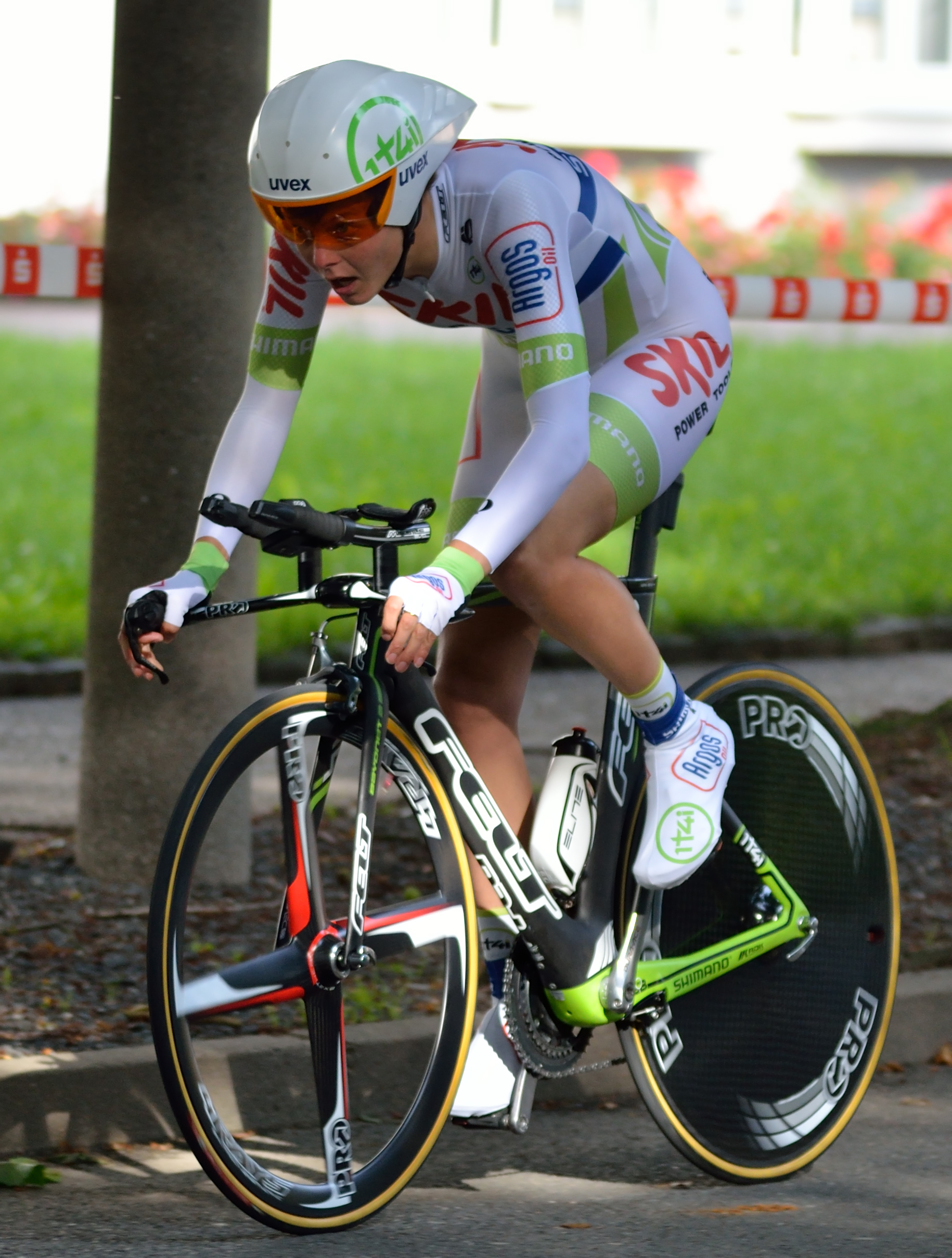

Personal information
- Full name: Adriana Visser
- Nickname: Adrie
- Born: 19 October 1983 (age 42) Hoorn, the Netherlands

Cycling career
- Sport: Cycling
- Current team: Boels–Dolmans
- Disciplines: Road and track
- Role: Rider
- Rider type: Sprinting specialist

Professional teams
- 2004: Farm Frites–Hartol
- 2005–2006: AA Cycling Team
- 2007–2009: DSB Bank - Nederland bloeit
- 2010–2011: Team HTC–Columbia Women
- 2012: Skil 1t4i
- 2013: Boels–Dolmans Cycling Team

Major wins
- World Cup Road: (Ronde van Drenthe 2007), World Cup Scratch Race: (2004 Sydney, 2005 Manchester)

Adriana ("Adrie") Visser (born 19 October 1983 in Hoorn) is a former Dutch track and road racer who lives in Wieringerwerf.

Visser started her professional career in 2001, when she finished second at the Dutch road race championship. She came fifth in the time trial. In track cycling she won her first national titles, becoming Dutch champion in the 500m time trial and sprint. She also won a silver medal in the points race. At the world championships in Trexlertown, Pennsylvania, USA, she was seventh in the 500m time trial and eighth in the sprint and individual pursuit.

She won a bronze medal at the 2003 World Track Championships in Stuttgart. In the same year she won the Dutch points, scratch and individual pursuit championships for the first time. In May 2004 she won her first World Cup meeting in Sydney, where she won the scratch before finishing 10th at the world championships in Melbourne a week later. Her first achievement in road cycling was the blue jersey for sprints in the Eumakumeen Bira in June 2004. A month later she won her first road race in Alblasserdam.

Back on the track that year she won another three national titles (points, individual pursuit and scratch). She also took part in the 2004 Summer Olympics participating in the points race and finishing 11th.

At the world championships in Manchester, England, in 2005, she finished fourth in the scratch event. She was fifth in the points race and seventh in the pursuit. In June on the road she won the Omloop Middag-Humsterland, Profronde van Stiphout and a race in Dalen. These brought her into the national team for the world road championship for the first time, finishing 84th in Madrid. She won her second World Cup track event in Manchester where she won the scratch again before defending her three national Dutch titles.

2006 started well when in January she won Egmond-Pier-Egmond. In March she won the road race in Oud Vossemeer. She finished in the top 10 in both the road race and the time trial championship (7th and 9th). Between 15 July and 1 August she won four road races; (Ochten), Barendrecht, Alblasserdam and Surhuisterveen). Dutch national coach Egon van Kessel selected her for the World championship again following these results.

On 31 March 2007, Visser took the bronze medal in the scratch race at the UCI Track World Championships in Palma de Mallorca. Two weeks later, she won her first big UCI Women's Road World Cup race, the Ronde van Drenthe (Netherlands).

== Palmares ==
=== Road cycling ===
2009 – DSB Bank–LTO 2009 season
6th Omloop Het Nieuwsblad

2010 – Team HTC–Columbia 2010 season

2011 – HTC–Highroad 2011 season

1st, 2011 Sparkassen Giro Bochum

2012 – Team Skil–Argos 2012 season

1st, 2012 Le Samyn des Dames

2013 – Boels–Dolmans Cycling Team 2013 season

=== Track cycling ===
2003
1st, Scratch, Dutch National Track Championships
2004
1st, Scratch, Dutch National Track Championships
2005
1st, Scratch, Dutch National Track Championships
2006
1st, Scratch, 2006 Dutch National Track Championships
1st, Points race, 2006 Dutch National Track Championships
2007
1st, 2007 Ronde van Drenthe World Cup, (World Cup)
2nd, Scratch, 2007 Dutch National Track Championships

== See also ==
- List of Dutch Olympic cyclists
