= Roxane Knetemann =

Dutch racing cyclist

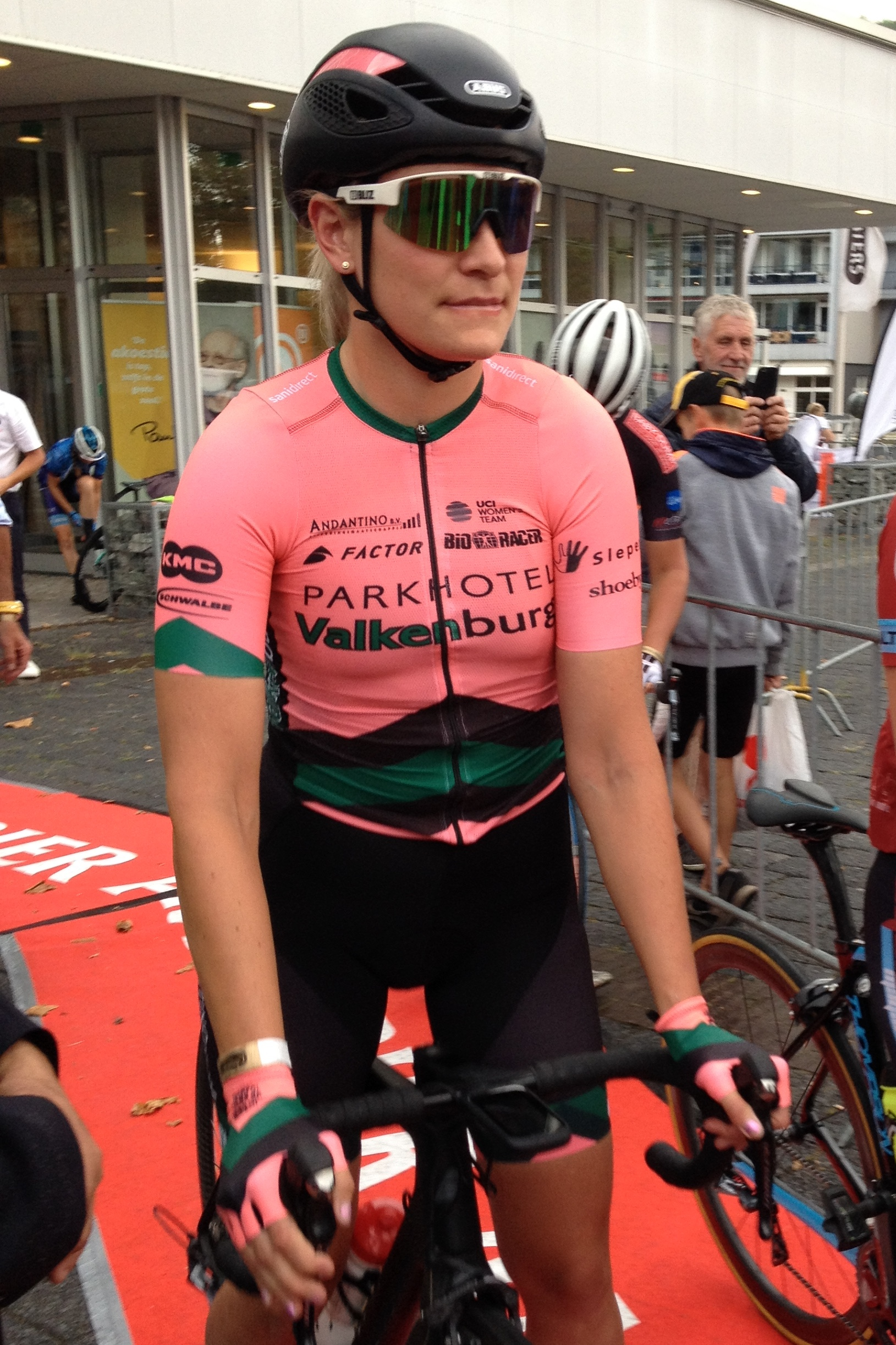
- Knetemann in 2019

Personal information
- Full name: Roxane Knetemann
- Nickname: Rox
- Born: 1 April 1987 (age 39) Alkmaar, Netherlands

Cycling career
- Sport: Cycling
- Current team: Retired
- Disciplines: Road; Track
- Role: Rider

Amateur teams
- 2009: Team Ton van Bemmelen Sports
- 2010: Merida Cycling Team
- 2011: Skil Koga
- 2011: Batavus Ladies Cycling Team

Professional teams
- 2006–2007: AA-Drink Cycling Team
- 2008: Vrienden van het Platteland
- 2012–2016: Rabobank-Liv Woman Cycling Team
- 2017: FDJ Nouvelle-Aquitaine Futuroscope
- 2018: Alé–Cipollini
- 2019: Parkhotel Valkenburg

Roxane Knetemann (born 1 April 1987 in Alkmaar) is a Dutch former professional racing cyclist, who rode professionally between 2006 and 2019 for the AA-Drink Cycling Team, Vrienden van het Platteland, Rabobank-Liv Woman Cycling Team, FDJ Nouvelle-Aquitaine Futuroscope, Alé–Cipollini and Parkhotel Valkenburg teams.

Her father was 1978 world champion cycling Gerrie Knetemann.

== Major results ==
=== Road ===
2004
UCI Junior Road World Championships

5th Road race
6th Time trial

2nd Time trial, National Junior Road Championships
2006
9th Overall Novilon Damesronde van Drenthe
2007
4th Omloop van Borsele
2012
9th Overall Ster Zeeuwsche Eilanden
10th 7-Dorpenomloop Aalburg
2013
2nd Team time trial, UCI Road World Championships
7th Overall La Route de France
7th Grand Prix de Dottignies
7th 7-Dorpenomloop Aalburg
7th Open de Suède Vårgårda
9th Omloop Het Nieuwsblad
10th Overall Thüringen Rundfahrt der Frauen
2014
2nd Open de Suède Vårgårda TTT
3rd GP du Canton d'Argovie
3rd Open de Suède Vårgårda
4th Holland Hills Classic
5th Gent–Wevelgem
8th Overall Ladies Tour of Norway
8th Ronde van Gelderland
10th Overall Energiewacht Tour
2015
3rd Team time trial, UCI Road World Championships
6th Gent–Wevelgem
6th Ronde van Overijssel
7th La Flèche Wallonne Féminine
8th Overall Holland Ladies Tour
8th Le Samyn des Dames
8th Marianne Vos Classic
8th Time trial, EPZ Omloop van Borsele
9th Overall Energiewacht Tour
10th Omloop Het Nieuwsblad
2016
1st Mountains classification Holland Ladies Tour
3rd Time trial, National Road Championships
Crescent Vårgårda UCI Women's WorldTour

3rd Team time trial
10th Road race

8th Overall Energiewacht Tour
2017
1st Combativity classification Healthy Ageing Tour
7th Overall Thüringen Rundfahrt der Frauen
9th Women's Tour de Yorkshire

==== Major championship results ====
Event		2006	2007	2008	2009	2010	2011	2012	2013	2014	2015	2016	2017	2018	2019
World Championships	Road race	—	—	—	—	—	—	—	—	DNF	81	93	—	—	—
World Championships	Team time trial	Did not exist						—	2	—	3	8	6	10	NH
European Championships	Road race	Did not exist										17	—	—	—
National Championships	Time trial	26	22	—	15	—	8	11	10	7	5	3	5	11	14
National Championships	Road race	—	44	—	33	18	9	—	9	41	11	59	DNF	62	86

=== Track ===
2005
National Track Championships

3rd Scratch
3rd Individual pursuit
3rd Points race

2009
National Track Championships

1st Points race
2nd Madison (with Amy Pieters)

2010
National Track Championships

1st Madison (with Amy Pieters)
2nd Scratch

2011
National Track Championships

3rd Scratch
3rd Points race

2012
National Track Championships

1st Madison (with Marianne Vos)
1st Points race

National Track Championships
2013

3rd Scratch
3rd Points race
