= 2013 UCI Track Cycling World Championships – Women's sprint =

Women's sprint at the 2013 UCI Track Cycling World Championships
- Venue: Minsk-Arena, Minsk, Belarus
- Date: 22–23 February 2013
- Competitors: 21 from 12 nations

Medalists
gold medal	Becky James	Great Britain
silver medal	Kristina Vogel	Germany
bronze medal	Lee Wai Sze	Hong Kong

Rainbow jersey

The Women's sprint at the 2013 UCI Track Cycling World Championships was held on February 22–23. 21 cyclists participated in the contest.

== Results ==
=== Qualifying ===
The qualifying was held at 13:00.

Rank	Name	Nation	Time	Notes
1	Becky James	Great Britain	10.957	Q
2	Kristina Vogel	Germany	11.057	Q
3	Lee Wai Sze	Hong Kong	11.070	Q
4	Gong Jinjie	China	11.135	Q
5	Guo Shuang	China	11.142	Q
6	Stephanie Morton	Australia	11.172	Q
7	Miriam Welte	Germany	11.189	Q
8	Olivia Montauban	France	11.208	Q
9	Virginie Cueff	France	11.222	Q
10	Kaarle McCulloch	Australia	11.238	Q
11	Juliana Gaviria	Colombia	11.345	Q
12	Victoria Williamson	Great Britain	11.360	Q
13	Lisandra Guerra	Cuba	11.394	Q
14	Tania Calvo Barbero	Spain	11.398	Q
15	Olga Streltsova	Russia	11.426	Q
16	Anastasiya Voynova	Russia	11.453	Q
17	Yelena Brezhniva	Russia	11.472	Q
18	Helena Casas Roige	Spain	11.541	Q
19	Kayono Maeda	Japan	11.605	Q
20	Hiroko Ishii	Japan	11.674	Q
21	Olena Tsyos	Ukraine	11.710	Q

=== Finals ===
==== 1/16 Finals ====
The 1/16 Finals were held at 13:50.

Heat	Rank	Name	Nation	Gap	Notes
1	1	Becky James	Great Britain		Q
1					
2	1	Kristina Vogel	Germany		Q
2					
3	1	Lee Wai Sze	Hong Kong		Q
3					
4	1	Gong Jinjie	China		Q
4	2	Olena Tsyos	Ukraine	+0.093	
5	1	Guo Shuang	China		Q
5	2	Hiroko Ishii	Japan	+0.126	
6	1	Stephanie Morton	Australia		Q
6	2	Kayono Maeda	Japan	+0.366	
7	1	Miriam Welte	Germany		Q
7	2	Helena Casas Roige	Spain	+0.238	
8	1	Olivia Montauban	France		Q
8	2	Yelena Brezhniva	Russia	+0.075	
9	1	Virginie Cueff	France		Q
9	2	Anastasiya Voynova	Russia	+0.090	
10	1	Kaarle McCulloch	Australia		Q
10	2	Olga Streltsova	Russia	+0.053	
11	1	Tania Calvo Barbero	Spain		Q
11	2	Juliana Gaviria	Colombia	REL	
12	1	Lisandra Guerra	Cuba		Q
12	2	Victoria Williamson	Great Britain	+0.080	

==== 1/8 Finals ====
The 1/8 Finals were held at 15:15.

Heat	Rank	Name	Nation	Gap	Notes
1	1	Becky James	Great Britain		Q
1	2	Lisandra Guerra	Cuba	+0.389	
2	1	Kristina Vogel	Germany		Q
2	2	Tania Calvo Barbero	Spain	+0.140	
3	1	Lee Wai Sze	Hong Kong		Q
3	2	Kaarle McCulloch	Australia	+0.132	
4	1	Virginie Cueff	France		Q
4	2	Gong Jinjie	China	+0.053	
5	1	Guo Shuang	China		Q
5	2	Olivia Montauban	France	+0.163	
6	1	Stephanie Morton	Australia		Q
6	2	Miriam Welte	Germany	REL	

===== Repechage =====
The 1/8 Finals repechages were held at 16:15.

Heat	Rank	Name	Nation	Gap	Notes
1	1	Gong Jinjie	China		Q
1	2	Lisandra Guerra	Cuba	+0.552	
1	3	Miriam Welte	Germany	+0.965	
2	1	Kaarle McCulloch	Australia		Q
2	2	Olivia Montauban	France	+0.019	
2	3	Tania Calvo Barbero	Spain	+0.143	

==== Quarterfinals ====
The Quarterfinals were held at 19:00.

Heat	Rank	Name	Nation	Race 1	Race 2	Decider	Notes
1	1	Becky James	Great Britain	X	X		Q
1	2	Kaarle McCulloch	Australia	+0.410	+0.117		
2	1	Kristina Vogel	Germany	X	X		Q
2	2	Gong Jinjie	China	+0.152	+0.007		
3	1	Lee Wai Sze	Hong Kong	X	X		Q
3	2	Stephanie Morton	Australia	+0.008	+0.116		
4	1	Guo Shuang	China	X	X		Q
4	2	Virginie Cueff	France	+0.178	+0.071		

==== Race for 5th-8th Places ====
The race for 5th-8th places was held at 21:30.

Rank	Name	Nation	Gap
5	Gong Jinjie	China	
6	Stephanie Morton	Australia	+0.027
7	Kaarle McCulloch	Australia	+0.057
8	Virginie Cueff	France	+0.155

==== Semifinals ====
The Semifinals were held at 15:40.

Heat	Rank	Name	Nation	Race 1	Race 2	Decider	Notes
1	1	Becky James	Great Britain	X	X		Q
1	2	Guo Shuang	China	+0.086	+0.089		
2	1	Kristina Vogel	Germany	X	X		Q
2	2	Lee Wai Sze	Hong Kong	+0.050	+0.026		

==== Finals ====
The Finals were held at 19:15.

===== Small Final =====
Rank	Name	Nation	Race 1	Race 2	Decider	Notes
3rd place, bronze medalist(s)	Lee Wai Sze	Hong Kong	X	X		
4	Guo Shuang	China	+0.004	+0.027		

===== Final =====
Rank	Name	Nation	Race 1	Race 2	Decider	Notes
1st place, gold medalist(s)	Becky James	Great Britain	+0.001	X	X	
2nd place, silver medalist(s)	Kristina Vogel	Germany	X	+0.056	+0.019	
