= 2013 UEC European Track Championships – Women's sprint =

Women's sprint at the 2013 UEC European Track Championships
- UEC European Champion jersey
- Venue: Omnisport Apeldoorn, Apeldoorn
- Date: 19 October
- Competitors: 18 from 10 nations

Medalists
gold medal	Kristina Vogel	Germany
silver medal	Elis Ligtlee	Netherlands
bronze medal	Jessica Varnish	Great Britain

The women's sprint was held on 19 October 2013, with 18 riders participating.

== Results ==
=== Qualifying ===
The fastest 12 riders advanced to the 1/8 finals.

Rank	Name	Nation	Time	Notes
1	Elis Ligtlee	Netherlands	11.115	Q
2	Kristina Vogel	Germany	11.213	Q
3	Virginie Cueff	France	11.338	Q
4	Jessica Varnish	Great Britain	11.374	Q
5	Olga Streltsova	Russia	11.399	Q
6	Victoria Williamson	Great Britain	11.399	Q
7	Tania Calvo	Spain	11.420	Q
8	Olivia Montauban	France	11.502	Q
9	Shanne Braspennincx	Netherlands	11.543	Q
10	Helena Casas	Spain	11.579	Q
11	Anastasia Voynova	Russia	11.595	Q
12	Miriam Welte	Germany	11.668	Q
13	Olena Tsyos	Ukraine	11.714	
14	Urszula Los	Poland	11.813	
15	Gintarė Gaivenytė-Mikalajūnė	Lithuania	11.924	
16	Katarzyna Kirschenstein	Poland	12.449	
17	Tetyana Klimchenko	Ukraine	12.750	
18	Elisa Turunen	Finland	12.875	

=== 1/8 Finals ===
Winners proceed directly to the quarter-finals; losers proceed to the repechage.

Heat	Rank	Name	Nation	Time	Notes
1	1	Elis Ligtlee	Netherlands	X	Q
1	2	Miriam Welte	Germany		
2	1	Kristina Vogel	Germany	X	Q
2	2	Anastasia Voynova	Russia		
3	1	Virginie Cueff	France	X	Q
3	2	Helena Casas	Spain		
4	1	Jessica Varnish	Great Britain	X	Q
4	2	Shanne Braspennincx	Netherlands		
5	1	Victoria Williamson	Great Britain	X	Q
5	2	Olivia Montauban	France		
6	1	Tania Calvo	Spain	X	Q
6	2	Olga Streltsova	Russia		

=== 1/8 Finals Repechages ===
Winners proceed to the quarter-finals.

Heat	Rank	Name	Nation	Time	Notes
1	1	Shanne Braspennincx	Netherlands	X	Q
1	2	Olga Streltsova	Russia		
1	3	Miriam Welte	Germany		
2	1	Olivia Montauban	France	X	Q
2	2	Helena Casas	Spain		
2	3	Anastasia Voynova	Russia		

=== Quarter-finals ===
One-on-one matches are extended to a 'best of three' format hereon. Winners proceed to the semi-finals; losers proceed to the race for places 5-8.

Heat	Rank	Name	Nation	Race 1	Race 2	Decider	Notes
1	1	Elis Ligtlee	Netherlands	X	X		Q
1	2	Olivia Montauban	France				
2	1	Kristina Vogel	Germany	X	X		Q
2	2	Shanne Braspennincx	Netherlands				
3	1	Virginie Cueff	France	X	X		Q
3	2	Tania Calvo	Spain				
4	1	Jessica Varnish	Great Britain	X	X		Q
4	2	Victoria Williamson	Great Britain				

=== Race for 5th place ===
This ranking final determines the allocation of places 5-8.

Rank	Name	Nation	Time
5	Tania Calvo	Spain	
6	Olivia Montauban	France	
7	Victoria Williamson	Great Britain	
8	Shanne Braspennincx	Netherlands	

=== Semi-finals ===
Winners proceed to the gold medal final; losers proceed to the bronze medal final.

Heat	Rank	Name	Nation	Race 1	Race 2	Decider	Notes
1	1	Elis Ligtlee	Netherlands	X	X		Q
1	2	Jessica Varnish	Great Britain				
2	1	Kristina Vogel	Germany	X	X		Q
2	2	Virginie Cueff	France				

=== Finals ===
Final rankings were determined in the medal races.

Rank	Name	Nation	Race 1	Race 2	Decider
Gold medal races
1st place, gold medalist(s)	Kristina Vogel	Germany	X	X	
2nd place, silver medalist(s)	Elis Ligtlee	Netherlands			
Bronze medal races
3rd place, bronze medalist(s)	Jessica Varnish	Great Britain	X	X	
4	Virginie Cueff	France			
