= 2013 UEC European Track Championships – Women's keirin =

Women's keirin at the 2013 UEC European Track Championships
- UEC European Champion jersey
- Venue: Omnisport Apeldoorn, Apeldoorn
- Date: 20 October
- Competitors: 18 from 10 nations

Medalists
gold medal	Elis Ligtlee	Netherlands
silver medal	Kristina Vogel	Germany
bronze medal	Virginie Cueff	France

The women's keirin was held on 20 October 2013, with 18 riders participating.

== Results ==
=== First round ===
Top 2 in each heat qualified directly for the second round; the remainder went to the first round repechage.

==== Heat 1 ====
Rank	Name	Nation	Notes
1	Kristina Vogel	Germany	Q
2	Helena Casas	Spain	Q
3	Yesna Rijkhoff	Netherlands	
4	Olena Tsyos	Ukraine	
5	Katarzyna Kirschenstein	Poland	
6	Yelena Brezhniva	Russia	

==== Heat 3 ====
Rank	Name	Nation	Notes
1	Victoria Williamson	Great Britain	Q
2	Sandie Clair	France	Q
3	Ekaterina Gnidenko	Russia	
4	Gintarė Gaivenytė-Mikalajūnė	Lithuania	
5	Elisa Turunen	Finland	
DNS	Miriam Welte	Germany	

==== Heat 2 ====
Rank	Name	Nation	Notes
1	Elis Ligtlee	Netherlands	Q
2	Becky James	Great Britain	Q
3	Urszula Łoś	Poland	
4	Tania Calvo	Spain	
5	Tetyana Klimchenko	Ukraine	
6	Virginie Cueff	France	

=== First Round Repechage ===
Top 3 in each heat qualified for the second round.

==== Heat 1 ====
Rank	Name	Nation	Notes
1	Tania Calvo	Spain	Q
2	Olena Tsyos	Ukraine	Q
3	Yesna Rijkhoff	Netherlands	Q
4	Ekaterina Gnidenko	Russia	
5	Katarzyna Kirschenstein	Poland	

==== Heat 2 ====
Rank	Name	Nation	Notes
1	Virginie Cueff	France	Q
2	Yelena Brezhniva	Russia	Q
3	Urszula Łoś	Poland	Q
4	Tetyana Klimchenko	Ukraine	
5	Elisa Turunen	Finland	
6	Gintarė Gaivenytė-Mikalajūnė	Lithuania	

=== Second round ===
First three riders in each semi qualified for the final; the remainder went to the small final (for places 7-12).

==== Semi-final 1 ====
Rank	Name	Nation	Notes
1	Kristina Vogel	Germany	Q
2	Yelena Brezhniva	Russia	Q
3	Yesna Rijkhoff	Netherlands	Q
4	Sandie Clair	France	
5	Tania Calvo	Spain	
6	Victoria Williamson	Great Britain	

==== Semi-final 2 ====
Rank	Name	Nation	Notes
1	Elis Ligtlee	Netherlands	Q
2	Virginie Cueff	France	Q
3	Olena Tsyos	Ukraine	Q
4	Becky James	Great Britain	
5	Urszula Łoś	Poland	
6	Helena Casas	Spain	

=== Finals ===
The final classification is determined in the ranking finals.

==== Final (places 7-12) ====
Rank	Name	Nation	Notes
7	Becky James	Great Britain	
8	Helena Casas	Spain	
9	Victoria Williamson	Great Britain	
10	Tania Calvo	Spain	
11	Sandie Clair	France	
12	Urszula Łoś	Poland	

==== Final (places 1-6) ====
Rank	Name	Nation	Notes
1st place, gold medalist(s)	Elis Ligtlee	Netherlands	
2nd place, silver medalist(s)	Kristina Vogel	Germany	
3rd place, bronze medalist(s)	Virginie Cueff	France	
4	Olena Tsyos	Ukraine	
5	Yesna Rijkhoff	Netherlands	
6	Yelena Brezhniva	Russia	
