= 2014 UEC European Track Championships – Women's keirin =

Women's keirin at the 2014 UEC European Track Championships
- UEC European Champion jersey
- Venue: Vélodrome Amédée Détraux, Baie-Mahault
- Date: 19 October
- Competitors: 22 from 13 nations

Medalists
| gold medal | Kristina Vogel | Germany |
| silver medal | Elena Brezhniva | Russia |
| bronze medal | Shanne Braspennincx | Netherlands |

The Women's keirin was held on 19 October 2014.

== Results ==
=== First round ===
Top two in each heat qualified directly for the second round; the remainder went to the first round repechage.

==== Heat 1 ====
| Rank | Name | Nation | Notes |
|---|---|---|---|
| 1 | Miriam Welte | Germany | Q |
| 2 | Olena Tsos | Ukraine | Q |
| 3 | Elis Ligtlee | Netherlands | |
| 4 | Urszula Los | Poland | |
| 5 | Gintarė Gaivenytė-Mikalajūnė | Lithuania | |

==== Heat 3 ====
| Rank | Name | Nation | Notes |
|---|---|---|---|
| 1 | Helena Casas | Spain | Q |
| 2 | Ekaterina Gnidenko | Russia | Q |
| 3 | Sandie Clair | France | |
| 4 | Shannon McCurley | Ireland | |
| 5 | Rosie Blount | Great Britain | |
| 6 | Elisa Turunen | Finland | |

==== Heat 2 ====
| Rank | Name | Nation | Notes |
|---|---|---|---|
| 1 | Kristina Vogel | Germany | Q |
| 2 | Katy Marchant | Great Britain | Q |
| 3 | Olivia Montauban | France | |
| 4 | Katarzyna Kirschenstein | Poland | |
| 5 | Tania Calvo | Spain | |

==== Heat 4 ====
| Rank | Name | Nation | Notes |
|---|---|---|---|
| 1 | Shanne Braspennincx | Netherlands | Q |
| 2 | Elena Brezhniva | Russia | Q |
| 3 | Simona Krupeckaitė | Lithuania | |
| 4 | Olga Ismayilova | Azerbaijan | |
| 5 | Nicky Degrendele | Belgium | |
| 6 | Olena Starikova | Ukraine | |

=== First round Repechage ===
Heat winners qualified for the second round.

==== Heat 1 ====
| Rank | Name | Nation | Notes |
|---|---|---|---|
| 1 | Elis Ligtlee | Netherlands | Q |
| 2 | Olga Ismayilova | Azerbaijan | |
| 3 | Rosie Blount | Great Britain | |

==== Heat 3 ====
| Rank | Name | Nation | Notes |
|---|---|---|---|
| 1 | Sandie Clair | France | Q |
| 2 | Katarzyna Kirschenstein | Poland | |
| 3 | Gintarė Gaivenytė-Mikalajūnė | Lithuania | |
| 4 | Olena Starikova | Ukraine | |

==== Heat 2 ====
| Rank | Name | Nation | Notes |
|---|---|---|---|
| 1 | Olivia Montauban | France | Q |
| 2 | Shannon McCurley | Ireland | |
| 3 | Nicky Degrendele | Belgium | |

==== Heat 4 ====
| Rank | Name | Nation | Notes |
|---|---|---|---|
| 1 | Simona Krupeckaitė | Lithuania | Q |
| 2 | Urszula Los | Poland | |
| 3 | Tania Calvo | Spain | |
| 4 | Elisa Turunen | Finland | |

=== Second round ===
First three riders in each semi qualified for the final; the remainder went to the small final (for places 7-12).

==== Semi-final 1 ====
| Rank | Name | Nation | Notes |
|---|---|---|---|
| 1 | Elis Ligtlee | Netherlands | Q |
| 2 | Simona Krupeckaitė | Lithuania | Q |
| 3 | Shanne Braspennincx | Netherlands | Q |
| 4 | Katy Marchant | Great Britain | |
| 5 | Ekaterina Gnidenko | Russia | |
| 6 | Miriam Welte | Germany | |

==== Semi-final 2 ====
| Rank | Name | Nation | Notes |
|---|---|---|---|
| 1 | Kristina Vogel | Germany | Q |
| 2 | Elena Brezhniva | Russia | Q |
| 3 | Olena Tsos | Ukraine | Q |
| 4 | Olivia Montauban | France | |
| 5 | Sandie Clair | France | |
| 6 | Helena Casas | Spain | |

=== Finals ===
The final classification is determined in the ranking finals.

==== Final (places 7-12) ====
| Rank | Name | Nation | Notes |
|---|---|---|---|
| 7 | Ekaterina Gnidenko | Russia | |
| 8 | Katy Marchant | Great Britain | |
| 9 | Olivia Montauban | France | |
| 10 | Miriam Welte | Germany | |
| 11 | Sandie Clair | France | |
| 12 | Helena Casas | Spain | |

==== Final (places 1-6) ====
| Rank | Name | Nation | Notes |
|---|---|---|---|
| 1st place, gold medalist(s) | Kristina Vogel | Germany | |
| 2nd place, silver medalist(s) | Elena Brezhniva | Russia | |
| 3rd place, bronze medalist(s) | Shanne Braspennincx | Netherlands | |
| 4 | Olena Tsos | Ukraine | |
| 5 | Simona Krupeckaitė | Lithuania | |
| 6 | Elis Ligtlee | Netherlands | |
