= 2014 UEC European Track Championships – Women's team sprint =

Women's team sprint at the 2014 UEC European Track Championships
- UEC European Champion jersey
- Venue: Vélodrome Amédée Détraux, Baie-Mahault
- Date: 16 October
- Competitors: 21 from 10 nations

Medalists
gold medal	Elena Brezhniva; Anastasiia Voinova; Daria Shmeleva	Russia
silver medal	Miriam Welte; Kristina Vogel	Germany
bronze medal	Elis Ligtlee; Shanne Braspennincx	Netherlands

The Women's team sprint was held on 16 October 2014.

== Results ==
=== Qualifying ===
The fastest 4 teams qualify for the medal finals.

Rank	Name	Nation	Time	Notes
1	Daria Shmeleva; Anastasiia Voinova	Russia	44.495	QG
2	Miriam Welte; Kristina Vogel	Germany	44.996	QG
3	Elis Ligtlee; Shanne Braspennincx	Netherlands	45.562	QB
4	Sandie Clair; Virginie Cueff	France	45.612	QB
5	Gintarė Gaivenytė-Mikalajūnė; Simona Krupeckaitė	Lithuania	46.106	
6	Tania Calvo; Helena Casas	Spain	46.116	
7	Rosie Blount; Katy Marchant	Great Britain	46.263	
8	Urszula Los; Katarzyna Kirschenstein	Poland	47.171	
9	Olena Starikova; Olena Tsos	Ukraine	47.244	
10	Elisa Turunen; Sara Ferrara	Finland	52.003	

- QG = qualified for gold medal final
- QB = qualified for bronze medal final

=== Finals ===
The final classification is determined in the medal finals.

Rank	Name	Nation	Time	Notes
Bronze medal final
3rd place, bronze medalist(s)	Elis Ligtlee; Shanne Braspennincx	Netherlands	45.302	
4	Sandie Clair; Virginie Cueff	France	45.428	
Gold medal final
1st place, gold medalist(s)	Elena Brezhniva; Anastasiia Voinova	Russia	44.341	
2nd place, silver medalist(s)	Miriam Welte; Kristina Vogel	Germany	44.623	
