= 2014 UEC European Track Championships – Women's sprint =

Women's sprint at the 2014 UEC European Track Championships
- UEC European Champion jersey
- Venue: Vélodrome Amédée Détraux, Baie-Mahault
- Date: 17–18 October
- Competitors: 21 from 12 nations

Medalists
gold medal	Anastasiia Voinova	Russia
silver medal	Tania Calvo	Spain
bronze medal	Kristina Vogel	Germany

The Women's sprint was held on 17–18 October 2014.

== Results ==
=== Qualifying ===
The top 3 proceed directly to the 1/8 finals; the remainder proceed to the 1/16 finals.

Rank	Name	Nation	Time	Notes
1	Olga Ismayilova	Azerbaijan	11.596	Q
2	Anastasiia Voinova	Russia	11.616	Q
3	Kristina Vogel	Germany	11.629	Q
4	Olivia Montauban	France	11.656	q
5	Tania Calvo	Spain	11.662	q
6	Olga Streltsova	Russia	11.697	q
7	Miriam Welte	Germany	11.709	q
8	Katy Marchant	Great Britain	11.773	q
9	Virginie Cueff	France	11.776	q
10	Gintarė Gaivenytė-Mikalajūnė	Lithuania	11.789	q
11	Simona Krupeckaitė	Lithuania	11.812	q
12	Olena Tsos	Ukraine	11.887	q
13	Elis Ligtlee	Netherlands	11.979	q
14	Olena Starikova	Ukraine	12.100	q
15	Shanne Braspennincx	Netherlands	12.108	q
16	Katarzyna Kirschenstein	Poland	12.114	q
17	Helena Casas	Spain	12.139	q
18	Rosie Blount	Great Britain	12.315	q
19	Urszula Los	Poland	12.332	q
20	Nicky Degrendele	Belgium	12.413	q
21	Elisa Turunen	Finland	13.904	q

- Q = qualified for 1/8 finals
- q = qualified for 1/16 finals

=== 1/16 Finals ===
Winners proceed to the 1/8 finals.

Heat	Rank	Name	Nation	Time	Notes
1	1	Olivia Montauban	France	12.495	Q
1	2	Elisa Turunen	Finland		
2	1	Tania Calvo	Spain	12.365	Q
2	2	Nicky Degrendele	Belgium		
3	1	Olga Streltsova	Russia	12.496	Q
3	2	Urszula Los	Poland		
4	1	Miriam Welte	Germany	12.636	Q
4	2	Rosie Blount	Great Britain		
5	1	Helena Casas	Spain	12.187	Q
5	2	Katy Marchant	Great Britain		
6	1	Virginie Cueff	France	12.458	Q
6	2	Katarzyna Kirschenstein	Poland		
7	1	Gintarė Gaivenytė-Mikalajūnė	Lithuania	12.931	Q
7	2	Shanne Braspennincx	Netherlands		
8	1	Simona Krupeckaitė	Lithuania	12.416	Q
8	2	Olena Starikova	Ukraine		
9	1	Olena Tsos	Ukraine	12.217	Q
9	2	Elis Ligtlee	Netherlands	REL	

=== 1/8 Finals ===
Winners proceed directly to the quarter-finals; losers proceed to the repechage.

Heat	Rank	Name	Nation	Time	Notes
1	1	Olga Ismayilova	Azerbaijan	12.366	Q
1	2	Olena Tsos	Ukraine		
2	1	Anastasiia Voinova	Russia	11.498	Q
2	2	Simona Krupeckaitė	Lithuania		
3	1	Kristina Vogel	Germany	12.500	Q
3	2	Gintarė Gaivenytė-Mikalajūnė	Lithuania		
4	1	Virginie Cueff	France	12.269	Q
4	2	Olivia Montauban	France		
5	1	Tania Calvo	Spain	11.829	Q
5	2	Helena Casas	Spain		
6	1	Miriam Welte	Germany	12.741	Q
6	2	Olga Streltsova	Russia		

=== 1/8 Finals Repechages ===
Winners proceed to the quarter-finals.

Heat	Rank	Name	Nation	Time	Notes
1	1	Olga Streltsova	Russia	12.038	Q
1	2	Olivia Montauban	France		
1	3	Olena Tsos	Ukraine		
2	1	Simona Krupeckaitė	Lithuania	12.659	Q
2	2	Helena Casas	Spain		
2	3	Gintarė Gaivenytė-Mikalajūnė	Lithuania		

=== Quarter-finals ===
One-on-one matches are extended to a 'best of three' format hereon. Winners proceed to the semi-finals; losers proceed to the race for places 5–8.

Heat	Rank	Name	Nation	Race 1	Race 2	Decider	Notes
1	1	Olga Ismayilova	Azerbaijan	12.334	12.258		Q
1	2	Simona Krupeckaitė	Lithuania				
2	1	Anastasiia Voinova	Russia	11.868	11.995		Q
2	2	Olga Streltsova	Russia				
3	1	Kristina Vogel	Germany	12.151	12.001		Q
3	2	Miriam Welte	Germany				
4	1	Tania Calvo	Spain	11.522	11.946		Q
4	2	Virginie Cueff	France				

=== Race for 5th place ===
This ranking final determines the allocation of places 5–8.

Rank	Name	Nation	Time
5	Simona Krupeckaitė	Lithuania	12.290
6	Olga Streltsova	Russia	
7	Miriam Welte	Germany	
8	Virginie Cueff	France	

=== Semi-finals ===
Winners proceed to the gold medal final; losers proceed to the bronze medal final.

Heat	Rank	Name	Nation	Race 1	Race 2	Decider	Notes
1	1	Tania Calvo	Spain	11.890	11.733		Q
1	2	Olga Ismayilova	Azerbaijan				
2	1	Anastasiia Voinova	Russia	11.799	11.426		Q
2	2	Kristina Vogel	Germany				

=== Finals ===
The final classification is determined in the medal finals.

Rank	Name	Nation	Race 1	Race 2	Decider
Bronze medal final
3rd place, bronze medalist(s)	Kristina Vogel	Germany	11.877	12.122	
4	Olga Ismayilova	Azerbaijan			
Gold medal final
1st place, gold medalist(s)	Anastasiia Voinova	Russia	11.604	11.865	
2nd place, silver medalist(s)	Tania Calvo	Spain			
