= 2013 UCI Track Cycling World Championships – Women's team sprint =

Rainbow jersey

The Women's team sprint at the 2013 UCI Track Cycling World Championships was held on February 20. 9 nations of 2 cyclists each participated in the contest. After the qualifying, the fastest 2 teams raced for gold, and 3rd and 4th teams raced for bronze.

== Medalists ==
Gold	Germany; Kristina Vogel; Miriam Welte
Silver	China; Gong Jinjie; Guo Shuang
Bronze	Great Britain; Victoria Williamson; Becky James

== Results ==
=== Qualifying ===
The qualifying was held at 19:00.

Rank	Name	Nation	Time	Notes
1	Kristina Vogel; Miriam Welte	Germany	33.150	Q
2	Gong Jinjie; Guo Shuang	China	33.151	Q
3	Victoria Williamson; Becky James	United Kingdom	33.762	Q
4	Kaarle McCulloch; Stephanie Morton	Australia	33.776	Q
5	Sandie Clair; Olivia Montauban	France	33.866	
6	Yelena Brezhniva; Anastasiya Voynova	Russia	33.901	
7	Tania Calvo; Helena Casas	Spain	34.086	
8	Hiroko Ishii; Kayono Maeda	Japan	35.320	
9	Tetyana Klimchenko; Olena Tsyos	Ukraine	36.355	

=== Finals ===
The finals were held at 21:10.

==== Small Final ====
Rank	Name	Nation	Time	Notes
3rd place, bronze medalist(s)	Victoria Williamson; Becky James	United Kingdom	33.893	
4	Kaarle McCulloch; Stephanie Morton	Australia	33.898	

==== Final ====
Rank	Name	Nation	Time	Notes
1st place, gold medalist(s)	Kristina Vogel; Miriam Welte	Germany	33.053	
2nd place, silver medalist(s)	Gong Jinjie; Guo Shuang	China	33.083	
