= 2013 UEC European Track Championships – Women's team sprint =

Women's team sprint at the 2013 UEC European Track Championships
- UEC European Champion jersey
- Venue: Omnisport Apeldoorn, Apeldoorn
- Date: 18 October
- Competitors: 20 from 10 nations
- Winning time: 33.563

Medalists
| gold medal | Yelena Brezhniva; Olga Stretsova | Russia |
| silver medal | Kristina Vogel; Miriam Welte | Germany |
| bronze medal | Jessica Varnish; Becky James | Great Britain |

The Women's team sprint at the 2013 UEC European Track Championships was held on 18 October 2013. 10 nations participated.

== Results ==
=== Qualifying ===
The fastest two teams progressed to the gold medal final; the following two progressed to the bronze medal final.

| Rank | Name | Nation | Time | Notes |
|---|---|---|---|---|
| 1/2 | Yelena Brezhniva; Olga Stretsova | Russia | ? | Q |
| 1/2 | Kristina Vogel; Miriam Welte | Germany | ? | Q |
| 3/4 | Jessica Varnish; Becky James | Great Britain | ? | q |
| 3/4 | Shanne Braspennincx; Elis Ligtlee | Netherlands | ? | q |
| 5 | Tania Calvo; Helena Casas | Spain | 34.110 | |
| 6 | Sandie Clair; Virginie Cueff | France | 34.216 | |
| 7 | Katarzyna Kirschenstein; Urszula Łoś | Poland | 36.476 | |
| 8 | Tetyana Klimchenko; Olena Tsyos | Ukraine | 36.517 | |
| 9 | Pia Pensaari; Elisa Turunen | Finland | 37.990 | |
| — | Gilke Croket; Sarah Inghelbrecht | Belgium | DNS | |

=== Finals ===
Final rankings were determined in the medal races.

| Rank | Name | Nation | Time | Notes |
|---|---|---|---|---|
| 1st place, gold medalist(s) | Yelena Brezhniva; Olga Stretsova | Russia | 33.563 | |
| 2nd place, silver medalist(s) | Kristina Vogel; Miriam Welte | Germany | 33.598 | |
| 3rd place, bronze medalist(s) | Jessica Varnish; Becky James | Great Britain | 33.771 | |
| 4 | Shanne Braspennincx; Elis Ligtlee | Netherlands | 34.235 | |
