= 2012 UCI Track Cycling World Championships – Women's team sprint =

Rainbow jersey

The Women's team sprint at the 2012 UCI Track Cycling World Championships was held on April 4. 16 nations of 2 cyclists each participated in the contest. After the qualifying, the fastest 2 teams raced for gold, and 3rd and 4th teams raced for bronze.

== Medalists ==
Gold	Germany; Kristina Vogel; Miriam Welte
Silver	Australia; Kaarle McCulloch; Anna Meares
Bronze	China; Gong Jinjie; Guo Shuang

== Results ==
=== Qualifying ===
The qualifying was held at 19:00.

Rank	Name	Nation	Time	Notes
1	Kristina Vogel; Miriam Welte	Germany	32.630	Q, WR
2	Kaarle McCulloch; Anna Meares	Australia	32.752	Q
3	Gong Jinjie; Guo Shuang	China	32.937	Q
4	Victoria Pendleton; Jessica Varnish	United Kingdom	32.941	Q
5	Sandie Clair; Clara Sanchez	France	33.355	
6	Viktoria Baranova; Anastasiya Voynova	Russia	33.440	
7	Yvonne Hijgenaar; Willy Kanis	Netherlands	33.571	
8	Lyubov Shulika; Olena Tsyos	Ukraine	33.639	
9	Tania Calvo; Helena Casas	Spain	34.276	
10	Natasha Hansen; Katie Schofield	New Zealand	34.278	
11	Daniela Larreal; Mariaesthela Vilera	Venezuela	34.335	
12	Diana García; Juliana Gaviria	Colombia	35.025	
13	Lee Eun-Ji; Lee Hye-Jin	South Korea	35.128	
14	Hiroko Ishii; Kayono Maeda	Japan	35.128	
15	Diao Xiao Juan; Lee Wai Sze	Hong Kong	36.631	
16	Gintarė Gaivenytė; Simona Krupeckaitė	Lithuania	33.544	REL*

- Lithuania - "For drawing away by more than 15 meters before the end of the lap that he is to lead Art. 3.2.153"

=== Finals ===
The finals were held at 20:05.

==== Small Final ====
Rank	Name	Nation	Time	Notes
3rd place, bronze medalist(s)	Gong Jinjie; Guo Shuang	China	32.870	
4	Victoria Pendleton; Jessica Varnish	United Kingdom	33.160	

==== Final ====
Rank	Name	Nation	Time	Notes
1st place, gold medalist(s)	Kristina Vogel; Miriam Welte	Germany	32.549	WR
2nd place, silver medalist(s)	Kaarle McCulloch; Anna Meares	Australia	32.597	
