= 2015 UEC European Track Championships – Women's team sprint =

Women's team sprint at the 2015 UEC European Track Championships
- UEC European Champion jersey
- Venue: Velodrome Suisse, Grenchen
- Date: 15 October
- Competitors: 20 from 10 nations

Medalists
gold medal	Anastasiia Voinova; Daria Shmeleva	Russia
silver medal	Miriam Welte; Kristina Vogel	Germany
bronze medal	Laurine van Riessen; Elis Ligtlee	Netherlands

The Women's team sprint was held on 15 October 2015.

== Results ==
=== Qualifying ===
The fastest 4 teams qualify for the medal finals.

Rank	Name	Nation	Time	Notes
1	Anastasiia Voinova; Daria Shmeleva	Russia	32.324	QG
2	Miriam Welte; Kristina Vogel	Germany	32.611	QG
3	Laurine van Riessen; Elis Ligtlee	Netherlands	32.955	QB
4	Tania Calvo; Helena Casas	Spain	33.087	QB
5	Jessica Varnish; Katy Marchant	Great Britain	33.149	
6	Virginie Cueff; Olivia Montauban	France	33.721	
7	Miglė Marozaitė; Simona Krupeckaitė	Lithuania	33.892	
8	Olena Starikova; Lyubov Basova	Ukraine	34.082	
9	Urszula Los; Katarzyna Kirschenstein	Poland	34.689	
10	Sara Ferrara; Pia Pensaari	Finland	38.020	

- QG = qualified for gold medal final
- QB = qualified for bronze medal final

=== Finals ===
The final classification is determined in the medal finals.

Rank	Name	Nation	Time	Notes
Bronze medal final
3rd place, bronze medalist(s)	Laurine van Riessen; Elis Ligtlee	Netherlands	33.091	
4	Tania Calvo; Helena Casas	Spain	33.302	
Gold medal final
1st place, gold medalist(s)	Anastasiia Voinova; Daria Shmeleva	Russia	32.443	
2nd place, silver medalist(s)	Miriam Welte; Kristina Vogel	Germany	33.013	
