= Cycling at the 2016 Summer Olympics – Women's sprint =

Women's cycling sprint at the Games of the XXXI Olympiad
- Venue: Rio Olympic Velodrome
- Date: 14–16 August 2016
- Competitors: 27 from 17 nations

Medalists
1st place, gold medalist(s)		Kristina Vogel	Germany
2nd place, silver medalist(s)		Becky James	Great Britain
3rd place, bronze medalist(s)		Katy Marchant	Great Britain

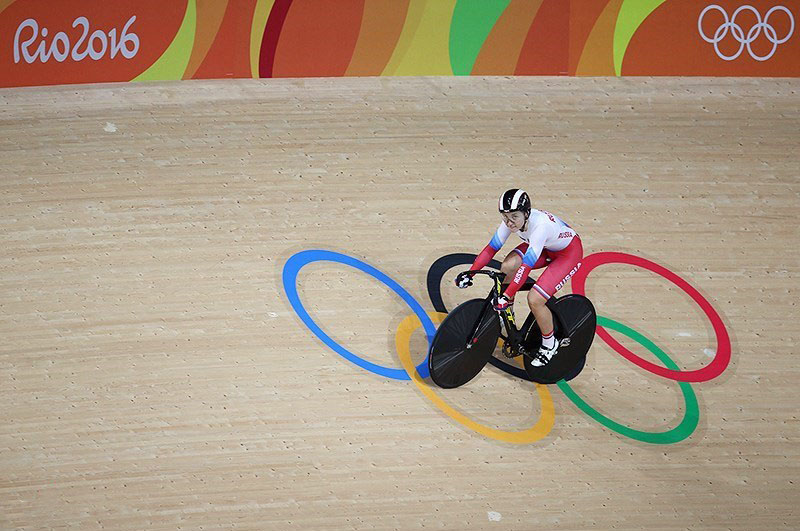
Daria Shmeleva, Russian cyclist

The women's cycling sprint at the 2016 Olympic Games in Rio de Janeiro took place on 14–16 August 2016.

The medals were presented by Timothy Fok, IOC member, Hong Kong and Brian Cookson, President of the UCI.

== Competition format ==
The event is a single-elimination tournament after the qualifying phase via time trial. Each match pitted two cyclists against each other in the best-of-three races base on their seeding in the qualifying phase. Each race was three laps of the track with side-by-side starts.

== Schedule ==
All times are Brasília Time (UTC-03:00)

Date	Time	Round
Sunday, 14 August 2016	16:00	Qualifications / heats
Sunday, 14 August 2016	17:12	First round
Monday, 15 August 2016	10:00	Second round
Tuesday, 16 August 2016	10:00	Quarter-finals
Tuesday, 16 August 2016	16:00; 17:44	Semi-finals; Final

== Results ==
=== Qualification ===
Rank	Rider	Time	Avg Speed (km/h)	Notes
1	Becky James (GBR)	10.721	67.158	Q, OR
2	Katy Marchant (GBR)	10.787	66.747	Q
3	Lee Wai Sze (HKG)	10.800	66.667	Q
4	Elis Ligtlee (NED)	10.803	66.648	Q
5	Zhong Tianshi (CHN)	10.820	66.543	Q
6	Kristina Vogel (GER)	10.865	66.268	Q
7	Natasha Hansen (NZL)	10.871	66.231	Q
8	Stephanie Morton (AUS)	10.875	66.207	Q
9	Anna Meares (AUS)	10.947	65.771	Q
10	Simona Krupeckaitė (LTU)	10.978	65.586	Q
11	Anastasia Voynova (RUS)	10.985	65.544	Q
12	Kate O'Brien (CAN)	11.020	65.336	Q
13	Laurine van Riessen (NED)	11.023	65.318	Q
14	Miriam Welte (GER)	11.038	65.229	Q
15	Gong Jinjie (CHN)	11.068	65.052	Q
16	Virginie Cueff (FRA)	11.099	64.871	Q
17	Monique Sullivan (CAN)	11.143	64.615	Q
18	Olga Ismayilova (AZE)	11.152	64.562	Q
19	Tania Calvo (ESP)	11.162	64.505	
20	Lisandra Guerra (CUB)	11.171	64.453	
21	Fatehah Mustapa (MAS)	11.207	64.246	
22	Daria Shmeleva (RUS)	11.230	64.114	
23	Olivia Podmore (NZL)	11.315	63.632	
24	Juliana Gaviria (COL)	11.505	62.581	
25	Sandie Clair (FRA)	11.517	62.516	
26	Helena Casas (ESP)	11.707	61.502	
27	Ebtissam Mohamed (EGY)	11.920	60.403	

=== First round ===
Heat 1

Name	Time	Avg speed (km/h)
Becky James (GBR)	11.367	63.285
Olga Ismayilova (AZE)	+0.165	

Heat 3

Name	Time	Avg speed (km/h)
Lee Wai Sze (HKG)	11.355	63.408
Virginie Cueff (FRA)	+0.089	

Heat 5

Name	Time	Avg speed (km/h)
Zhong Tianshi (CHN)	11.310	63.660
Miriam Welte (GER)	+0.499	

Heat 7

Name	Time	Avg speed (km/h)
Natasha Hansen (NZL)	11.400	63.157
Kate O'Brien (CAN)	+0.183	

Heat 9

Name	Time	Avg speed (km/h)
Simona Krupeckaitė (LTU)	11.308	63.671
Anna Meares (AUS)	+0.408	

Heat 2

Name	Time	Avg speed (km/h)
Katy Marchant (GBR)	11.499	62.614
Monique Sullivan (CAN)	+0.150	

Heat 4

Name	Time	Avg speed (km/h)
Elis Ligtlee (NED)	11.425	63.019
Gong Jinjie (CHN)	+0.104	

Heat 6

Name	Time	Avg speed (km/h)
Kristina Vogel (GER)	11.279	63.835
Laurine van Riessen (NED)	+0.179	

Heat 8

Name	Time	Avg speed (km/h)
Anastasia Voynova (RUS)	11.503	62.592
Stephanie Morton (AUS)	+0.097	

=== First round Repechage ===
Heat 1

Name	Time	Avg speed (km/h)
Anna Meares (AUS)	11.716	61.454
Olga Ismayilova (AZE)	+0.065	
Laurine van Riessen (NED)	+0.072	

Heat 2

Name	Time	Avg speed (km/h)
Miriam Welte (GER)	11.466	62.794
Kate O'Brien (CAN)	+0.061	
Monique Sullivan (CAN)	+0.154	

Heat 3

Name	Time	Avg speed (km/h)
Virginie Cueff (FRA)	11.496	62.630
Stephanie Morton (AUS)	+0.012	
Gong Jinjie (CHN)	+0.188	

=== Second round ===
Heat 1

Name	Time	Avg speed (km/h)
Becky James (GBR)	11.375	63.296
Virginie Cueff (FRA)	+0.037	

Heat 3

Name	Time	Avg speed (km/h)
Lee Wai Sze (HKG)	11.551	62.332
Anna Meares (AUS)	+0.081	

Heat 5

Name	Time	Avg speed (km/h)
Anastasia Voynova (RUS)	11.271	63.880
Zhong Tianshi (CHN)	+0.001	

Heat 2

Name	Time	Avg speed (km/h)
Katy Marchant (GBR)	12.247	58.789
Miriam Welte (GER)	+0.343	

Heat 4

Name	Time	Avg speed (km/h)
Elis Ligtlee (NED)	11.360	63.380
Simona Krupeckaitė (LTU)	+0.033	+0.025

Heat 6

Name	Time	Avg speed (km/h)
Kristina Vogel (GER)	11.197	64.302
Natasha Hansen (NZL)	+0.092	

=== Second round Repechage ===
Match 1

Name	Time	Avg speed (km/h)
Simona Krupeckaitė (LTU)	11.614	61.994
Virginie Cueff (FRA)	+0.001	
Natasha Hansen (NZL)	+0.150	

Match 2

Name	Time	Average speed (km/h)
Zhong Tianshi (CHN)	11.557	62.299
Anna Meares (AUS)	+0.082	
Miriam Welte (GER)	+1.766	

=== 9th–12th place classifications ===
Name	Time	Avg speed (km/h)	Rank
Natasha Hansen (NZL)	11.852	61.042	9
Anna Meares (AUS)	+0.068		10
Miriam Welte (GER)	+0.174		11
Virginie Cueff (FRA)	+0.181		12

=== Quarterfinals ===
Heat 1

Name	Time (Race 1)	Time (Race 2)
Becky James (GBR)	11.289	11.243
Zhong Tianshi (CHN)	+0.025	+0.016

Heat 3

Name	Time (Race 1)	Time (Race 2)
Katy Marchant (GBR)	11.225	11.342
Simona Krupeckaitė (LTU)	+1.139	+0.232

Heat 2

Name	Time (Race 1)	Time (Race 2)
Kristina Vogel (GER)	11.230	11.373
Lee Wai Sze (HKG)	+0.044	+0.189

Heat 4

Name	Time (Race 1)	Time (Race 2)
Elis Ligtlee (NED)	11.405	11.391
Anastasia Voynova (RUS)	+0.033	+0.007

=== 5th–8th place classifications ===
Name	Time	Avg speed (km/h)	Rank
Zhong Tianshi (CHN)	11.197	64.302	5
Lee Wai Sze (HKG)	+0.005		6
Simona Krupeckaitė (LTU)	+0.203		7
Anastasia Voynova (RUS)	+0.353		8

=== Semifinals ===
Heat 1

Name	Time (Race 1)	Time (Race 2)
Becky James (GBR)	11.246	10.970
Elis Ligtlee (NED)	+0.038	+0.400

Heat 2

Name	Time (Race 1)	Time (Race 2)
Kristina Vogel (GER)	11.302	11.153
Katy Marchant (GBR)	+0.065	+0.089

=== Finals ===
Bronze medal match

Name	Time (Race 1)	Time (Race 2)
Katy Marchant (GBR)	11.237	11.424
Elis Ligtlee (NED)	+0.087	+0.007

Gold medal match

Name	Time (Race 1)	Time (Race 2)
Kristina Vogel (GER)	11.237	11.312
Becky James (GBR)	+0.016	+0.004
