= 2010 UCI Track Cycling World Championships – Women's team sprint =

Rainbow jersey

The Women's Team Sprint is one of the 9 women's events at the 2010 UCI Track Cycling World Championships, held in Ballerup, Denmark.

Twelve teams of 2 cyclists each participated in the contest. After the qualifying, the fastest 2 teams raced for gold, and 3rd and 4th teams raced for bronze.

The Qualifying and the Finals were held on March 25.

== World record ==
World record
WR	33.149	Australia	Pruszków (Poland)	26 March 2009

== Qualifying ==
Rank	Name	Nation	Time	Notes
1	Kaarle McCulloch; Anna Meares	Australia	33.037	Q WR
2	Gong Jinjie; Lin Junhong	China	33.244	Q
3	Gintarė Gaivenytė; Simona Krupeckaitė	Lithuania	33.261	Q
4	Victoria Pendleton; Jessica Varnish	Great Britain	33.383	Q
5	Sandie Clair; Clara Sanchez	France	33.490	
6	Kristina Vogel; Miriam Welte	Germany	33.604	
7	Yvonne Hijgenaar; Willy Kanis	Netherlands	33.672	
8	Victoria Baranova; Olga Streltsova	Russia	34.269	
9	Renata Dąbrowska; Aleksandra Drejgier	Poland	35.058	
10	Lee Wai Sze; Meng Zhao Juan	Hong Kong	35.252	
11	Eleni Klapanara; Angeliki Koutsonikoli	Greece	36.008	
12	Jutatip Maneephan; Srichaum Chanakan	Thailand	37.325	

== Finals ==
Rank	Name	Nation	Time
Gold Medal Race
1st place, gold medalist(s)	Kaarle McCulloch; Anna Meares	Australia	32.923 WR
2nd place, silver medalist(s)	Gong Jinjie; Lin Junhong	China	33.192
Bronze Medal Race
3rd place, bronze medalist(s)	Gintarė Gaivenytė; Simona Krupeckaitė	Lithuania	33.109
4	Victoria Pendleton; Jessica Varnish	Great Britain	33.593
