= 2015 UEC European Track Championships – Women's sprint =

Women's sprint at the 2015 UEC European Track Championships
- UEC European Champion jersey
- Venue: Velodrome Suisse, Grenchen
- Date: 16 October
- Competitors: 20 from 12 nations

Medalists
gold medal	Elis Ligtlee	Netherlands
silver medal	Anastasiia Voinova	Russia
bronze medal	Kristina Vogel	Germany

The Women's sprint was held on 16 October 2015.

== Results ==
=== Qualifying ===
The top 18 qualify for the match rounds.

Rank	Name	Nation	Time	Notes
1	Elis Ligtlee	Netherlands	10.742	Q
2	Kristina Vogel	Germany	10.828	Q
3	Anastasiia Voinova	Russia	10.914	Q
4	Katy Marchant	Great Britain	10.941	Q
5	Virginie Cueff	France	10.949	Q
6	Simona Krupeckaitė	Lithuania	11.081	Q
7	Laurine van Riessen	Netherlands	11.145	Q
8	Jessica Varnish	Great Britain	11.165	Q
9	Helena Casas	Spain	11.198	Q
10	Tania Calvo	Spain	11.224	Q
11	Tatiana Kiseleva	Russia	11.269	Q
12	Olga Ismayilova	Azerbaijan	11.282	Q
13	Katarzyna Kirschenstein	Poland	11.426	Q
14	Olena Starikova	Ukraine	11.431	Q
15	Liubov Basova	Ukraine	11.447	Q
16	Miglė Marozaitė	Lithuania	11.449	Q
17	Nicky Degrendele	Belgium	11.511	Q
18	Urszula Los	Poland	11.862	Q
19	Maila Andreotti	Italy	11.948	
—	Miriam Welte	Germany	DNS	

=== 1/16 Finals ===
Winners proceed directly to the 1/8 finals; losers proceed to the repechage.

Heat	Rank	Name	Nation	Gap	Notes
1	1	Elis Ligtlee	Netherlands		Q
1	2	Urszula Los	Poland	+0.660	
2	1	Kristina Vogel	Germany		Q
2	2	Nicky Degrendele	Belgium	+0.191	
3	1	Anastasiia Voinova	Russia		Q
3	2	Miglė Marozaitė	Lithuania	+0.210	
4	1	Katy Marchant	Great Britain		Q
4	2	Liubov Basova	Ukraine	+0.142	
5	1	Virginie Cueff	France		Q
5	2	Olena Starikova	Ukraine	+0.510	
6	1	Simona Krupeckaitė	Lithuania		Q
6	2	Katarzyna Kirschenstein	Poland	+0.130	
7	1	Laurine van Riessen	Netherlands		Q
7	2	Olga Ismayilova	Azerbaijan	+0.127	
8	1	Jessica Varnish	Great Britain		Q
8	2	Tatiana Kiseleva	Russia	+0.002	
9	1	Helena Casas	Spain		Q
9	2	Tania Calvo	Spain	+0.001	

=== 1/16 Finals Repechages ===
Winners proceed to the 1/8 finals.

Heat	Rank	Name	Nation	Gap	Notes
1	1	Tania Calvo	Spain		Q
1	2	Katarzyna Kirschenstein	Poland	+0.576	
1	3	Urszula Los	Poland	+0.727	
2	1	Olena Starikova	Ukraine		Q
2	2	Olga Ismayilova	Azerbaijan	+0.013	
2	3	Nicky Degrendele	Belgium	+0.085	
3	1	Liubov Basova	Ukraine		Q
3	2	Tatiana Kiseleva	Russia	+0.044	
3	3	Miglė Marozaitė	Lithuania	+0.239	

=== 1/8 Finals ===
Winners proceed directly to the quarter-finals; losers proceed to the repechage.

Heat	Rank	Name	Nation	Gap	Notes
1	1	Elis Ligtlee	Netherlands		Q
1	2	Liubov Basova	Ukraine	+0.220	
2	1	Kristina Vogel	Germany		Q
2	2	Olena Starikova	Ukraine	+1.324	
3	1	Anastasiia Voinova	Russia		Q
3	2	Tania Calvo	Spain	+0.353	
4	1	Katy Marchant	Great Britain		Q
4	2	Helena Casas	Spain	+0.108	
5	1	Virginie Cueff	France		Q
5	2	Jessica Varnish	Great Britain	+0.300	
6	1	Simona Krupeckaitė	Lithuania		Q
6	2	Laurine van Riessen	Netherlands	+0.053	

=== 1/8 Finals Repechages ===
Winners proceed to the quarter-finals; losers proceed to the race for places 9-12.

Heat	Rank	Name	Nation	Gap	Notes
1	1	Helena Casas	Spain		Q
1	2	Liubov Basova	Ukraine	+0.057	
1	3	Laurine van Riessen	Netherlands	+0.169	
2	1	Tania Calvo	Spain		Q
2	2	Olena Starikova	Ukraine	+0.056	
2	3	Jessica Varnish	Great Britain	+0.170	

=== Race for 9th place ===
This ranking final determines the allocation of places 9-12.

Rank	Name	Nation	Gap
9	Laurine van Riessen	Netherlands	
10	Jessica Varnish	Great Britain	+0.144
11	Liubov Basova	Ukraine	+0.270
12	Olena Starikova	Ukraine	+0.534

=== Quarter-finals ===
One-on-one matches are extended to a 'best of three' format hereon. Winners proceed to the semi-finals; losers proceed to the race for places 5-8.

Heat	Rank	Name	Nation	Race 1	Race 2	Decider	Notes
1	1	Elis Ligtlee	Netherlands	X	X		Q
1	2	Tania Calvo	Spain	+0.112	+0.313		
2	1	Kristina Vogel	Germany	X	X		Q
2	2	Helena Casas	Spain	+0.137	+0.639		
3	1	Anastasiia Voinova	Russia	+0.183	X	X	Q
3	2	Simona Krupeckaitė	Lithuania	X	+0.268	+0.069	
4	1	Virginie Cueff	France	+0.021	X	X	Q
4	2	Katy Marchant	Great Britain	X	+0.024	+0.049	

=== Race for 5th place ===
This ranking final determines the allocation of places 5-8.

Rank	Name	Nation	Gap
5	Simona Krupeckaitė	Lithuania	
6	Tania Calvo	Spain	+0.085
7	Katy Marchant	Great Britain	+0.095
8	Helena Casas	Spain	+0.174

=== Semi-finals ===
Winners proceed to the gold medal final; losers proceed to the bronze medal final.

Heat	Rank	Name	Nation	Race 1	Race 2	Decider	Notes
1	1	Elis Ligtlee	Netherlands	X	X		Q
1	2	Virginie Cueff	France	+0.007	+0.502		
2	1	Anastasiia Voinova	Russia	X	X		Q
2	2	Kristina Vogel	Germany	REL	+0.053		

=== Finals ===
The final classification is determined in the medal finals.

Rank	Name	Nation	Race 1	Race 2	Decider
Bronze medal final
3rd place, bronze medalist(s)	Kristina Vogel	Germany	X	X	
4	Virginie Cueff	France	+0.129	+0.125	
Gold medal final
1st place, gold medalist(s)	Elis Ligtlee	Netherlands	X	X	
2nd place, silver medalist(s)	Anastasiia Voinova	Russia	+0.283	+0.124	
