= World record progression track cycling – Women's flying 500 m time trial =

This is an overview of the progression of the World track cycling record of the women's flying 500 m time trial as recognised by the Union Cycliste Internationale.

== Progression ==
=== Amateurs (1955–1990) ===
Time	Cyclist	Location	Track	Date
38"40	Daisy Franks (GBR)	London (GBR), Herne Hill	Open air	16 April 1955
36"80	L. Haritonides (FRA)	Paris FRA Vélodrome Municipal	Open air	22 May 1955
32"80	Liubov Razouvaeva (URS)	Irkoutsk (URS), St. Dynamo	Open air	17 July 1955
35"	Karla Gunter (RDA)	Berlin (RFA), Hallenstadion	Indoor	7 March 1964
31"70	Galina Tsareva (URS)	Tbilissi (URS)	Open air	6 October 1978
34"322	Luigina Bissoli (ITA)	Milan (ITA), Palais Des Sports	Indoor	6 December 1978
33"571	Rossella Galbiati (ITA)	Milan (ITA), Palais Des Sports	Indoor	15 November 1979
32"302	Galina Tsareva (URS)	Moscow (URS)	Indoor	24 April 1980
31"112	Natalia Krouchelnitskaya (URS)	Moscow (URS)	Indoor	23 April 1982
30"642	R. Whitehead (USA)	Colorado Springs (USA)	Open air	16 August 1986
30"59	Isabelle Gautheron (FRA)	Cali (COL), A.N. Patino	Open air	14 September 1986
30"834	Natalia Krouchelnitskaya (URS)	Moscow (URS)	Indoor	4 February 1987
29"655	Erika Salumäe (URS)	Moscow (URS)	Indoor	6 August 1987

=== Open (from 1992) ===
Time	Cyclist	Location	Track	Date	Meet	Ref
29"481	Olga Streltsova (RUS)	Moscow (RUS)	Indoor	29 May 2011		
29"234	Olga Streltsova (RUS)	Moscow (RUS)	Indoor	30 May 2014		
28"970	Kristina Vogel (GER)	Frankfurt (Oder)	Indoor	17 December 2016	9th Frankfurter Kreisel	
