= 2017 UCI Track Cycling World Championships – Women's keirin =

Women's keirin at the 2017 UCI Track Cycling World Championships
- Venue: Hong Kong Velodrome
- Location: Hong Kong
- Dates: 16 April
- Competitors: 27 from 16 nations

Medalists
gold medal	Kristina Vogel	Germany
silver medal	Martha Bayona	Colombia
bronze medal	Nicky Degrendele	Belgium

The Women's keirin competition at the 2017 World Championships was held on 16 April 2017.

== Results ==
=== First round ===
The first two riders in each heat qualified to the second round, all other riders advanced to the first round repechages.

==== Heat 1 ====
Rank	Name	Nation	Gap	Notes
1	Kristina Vogel	Germany		Q
2	Shanne Braspennincx	Netherlands	+0.054	Q
3	Helena Casas	Spain	+0.889	
4	Tatiana Kiseleva	Russia	+1.006	
5	Miglė Marozaitė	Lithuania	+1.186	
6	Yuli Verdugo	Mexico	+1.234	
7	Lin Junhong	China	+1.652	

==== Heat 2 ====
Rank	Name	Nation	Gap	Notes
1	Stephanie Morton	Australia		Q
2	Guo Shuang	China	+0.016	Q
3	Emma Hinze	Germany	+0.408	
4	Lyubov Basova	Ukraine	+0.565	
5	Lee Hye-jin	South Korea	+0.617	
6	Anastasia Voynova	Russia	+0.873	
7	Laurine van Riessen	Netherlands	+0.911	

==== Heat 3 ====
Rank	Name	Nation	Gap	Notes
1	Lee Wai Sze	Hong Kong		Q
2	Nicky Degrendele	Belgium	+0.055	Q
3	Kaarle McCulloch	Australia	+0.079	
4	Katy Marchant	Great Britain	+0.246	
5	Kate O'Brien	Canada	+0.348	
6	Pauline Grabosch	Germany	+0.400	
7	Tania Calvo	Spain	+0.444	

==== Heat 4 ====
Rank	Name	Nation	Gap	Notes
1	Martha Bayona	Colombia		Q
2	Simona Krupeckaitė	Lithuania	+0.003	Q
3	Daniela Gaxiola	Mexico	+0.057	
4	Holly Takos	Australia	+0.247	
5	Shannon McCurley	Ireland	+1.014	
6	Olena Starikova	Ukraine	DNF	

- Q = qualified to Second round

=== First round repechage ===
The winner of each heat qualified to the second round.

==== Heat 1 ====
Rank	Name	Nation	Gap	Notes
1	Anastasia Voynova	Russia		Q
2	Helena Casas	Spain	+0.028	
3	Kate O'Brien	Canada	+0.281	
4	Holly Takos	Australia	+0.446	
5	Lin Junhong	China	+0.996	

==== Heat 2 ====
Rank	Name	Nation	Gap	Notes
1	Lee Hye-jin	South Korea		Q
2	Yuli Verdugo	Mexico	+0.089	
3	Katy Marchant	Great Britain	+0.198	
4	Emma Hinze	Germany	+0.243	

==== Heat 3 ====
Rank	Name	Nation	Gap	Notes
1	Lyubov Basova	Ukraine		Q
2	Kaarle McCulloch	Australia	+0.254	
3	Tania Calvo	Spain	+0.369	
4	Pauline Grabosch	Germany	+0.382	
5	Miglė Marozaitė	Lithuania	+0.487	

==== Heat 4 ====
Rank	Name	Nation	Gap	Notes
1	Laurine van Riessen	Netherlands		Q
2	Daniela Gaxiola	Mexico	+0.108	
3	Tatiana Kiseleva	Russia	+0.272	
4	Shannon McCurley	Ireland	+0.325	
5	Olena Starikova	Ukraine	+0.834	

- Q = qualified to Second round

=== Second round ===
The first three riders in each heat qualified to the final, all other riders advanced to final 7–12.

==== Heat 1 ====
Rank	Name	Nation	Gap	Notes
1	Kristina Vogel	Germany		Q
2	Martha Bayona	Colombia	+0.065	Q
3	Nicky Degrendele	Belgium	+0.102	Q
4	Anastasia Voynova	Russia	+0.149	
5	Laurine van Riessen	Netherlands	+0.362	
6	Guo Shuang	China	+0.520	

==== Heat 2 ====
Rank	Name	Nation	Gap	Notes
1	Stephanie Morton	Australia		Q
2	Shanne Braspennincx	Netherlands	+0.030	Q
3	Simona Krupeckaitė	Lithuania	+0.316	Q
4	Lyubov Basova	Ukraine	+0.529	
5	Lee Wai Sze	Hong Kong	+0.739	
–	Lee Hye-jin	South Korea		DNF

=== Finals ===
The finals were started at 15:39.

==== Small final ====
Rank	Name	Nation	Gap	Notes
7	Laurine van Riessen	Netherlands		
8	Anastasia Voynova	Russia	+0.090	
9	Lyubov Basova	Ukraine	+0.180	
10	Lee Wai Sze	Hong Kong	+0.332	
11	Guo Shuang	China	+0.465	
12	Lee Hye-jin	South Korea	+0.851	

==== Final ====
Rank	Name	Nation	Gap	Notes
1st place, gold medalist(s)	Kristina Vogel	Germany		
2nd place, silver medalist(s)	Martha Bayona	Colombia	+0.061	
3rd place, bronze medalist(s)	Nicky Degrendele	Belgium	+0.130	
4	Stephanie Morton	Australia	+0.257	
5	Shanne Braspennincx	Netherlands	+0.288	
6	Simona Krupeckaitė	Lithuania	+1.480	
