= 2011 European Track Championships – Women's team sprint =

UEC European Champion jersey

The Women's team sprint was held on 21 October 2011 with 11 teams participating.

== Medalists ==
Gold	Great Britain; Victoria Pendleton; Jessica Varnish
Silver	Ukraine; Lyubov Shulika; Olena Tsyos
Bronze	Germany; Kristina Vogel; Miriam Welte

== Results ==
=== Qualifying ===
Fastest 2 teams race for gold and 3rd and 4th teams race for bronze. It was held at 15:35.

Rank	Name	Nation	Time	Notes
1	Victoria Pendleton; Jessica Varnish	Great Britain	33.559	Q
2	Lyubov Shulika; Olena Tsyos	Ukraine	33.849	Q
3	Viktoria Baranova; Anastasia Voynova	Russia	33.884	q
4	Kristina Vogel; Miriam Welte	Germany	33.973	q
5	Yvonne Hijgenaar; Willy Kanis	Netherlands	34.507	
6	Sandie Clair; Clara Sanchez	France	34.553	
7	Tania Calvo; Helena Casas Roige	Spain	34.656	
8	Gabriele Jankute; Simona Krupeckaitė	Lithuania	35.055	
9	Angeliki Koutsonikoli; Dimitra Patapi	Greece	35.851	
10	Elisa Frisoni; Manuela Grillo	Italy	36.168	
11	Natalia Rutkowska; Małgorzata Wojtyra	Poland	36.325	

== Finals ==
The final was held at 20:46.

Rank	Name	Nation	Time
Gold Medal Race
1st place, gold medalist(s)	Victoria Pendleton; Jessica Varnish	Great Britain	33.276
2nd place, silver medalist(s)	Lyubov Shulika; Olena Tsyos	Ukraine	33.786
Bronze Medal Race
3rd place, bronze medalist(s)	Kristina Vogel; Miriam Welte	Germany	33.678
4	Viktoria Baranova; Anastasia Voynova	Russia	33.820
