= 2017 UCI Track Cycling World Championships – Women's sprint =

Women's sprint at the 2017 UCI Track Cycling World Championships
- Venue: Hong Kong Velodrome
- Location: Hong Kong
- Dates: 13–14 April
- Competitors: 29 from 17 nations

Medalists
gold medal	Kristina Vogel	Germany
silver medal	Stephanie Morton	Australia
bronze medal	Lee Wai Sze	Hong Kong

The Women's sprint competition at the 2017 World Championships was held on 13 and 14 April 2017.

== Results ==
=== Qualifying ===
The top four riders advanced directly to the 1/8 finals; places 5 to 28 advanced to the 1/16 final.

Rank	Name	Nation	Time	Behind	Notes
1	Stephanie Morton	Australia	10.724		Q
2	Lee Wai Sze	Hong Kong	10.764	+0.040	Q
3	Kristina Vogel	Germany	10.816	+0.092	Q
4	Mathilde Gros	France	10.826	+0.102	Q, WJR
5	Simona Krupeckaitė	Lithuania	10.937	+0.213	q
6	Natasha Hansen	New Zealand	10.945	+0.221	q
7	Kaarle McCulloch	Australia	10.962	+0.238	q
8	Pauline Grabosch	Germany	10.967	+0.243	q
9	Anastasia Voynova	Russia	10.975	+0.251	q
10	Daria Shmeleva	Russia	11.012	+0.288	q
11	Lyubov Basova	Ukraine	11.044	+0.320	q
12	Martha Bayona	Colombia	11.062	+0.338	q
13	Holly Takos	Australia	11.075	+0.351	q
14	Kate O'Brien	Canada	11.106	+0.382	q
15	Miglė Marozaitė	Lithuania	11.147	+0.423	q
16	Katy Marchant	Great Britain	11.151	+0.427	q
17	Lin Junhong	China	11.169	+0.445	q
18	Laurine van Riessen	Netherlands	11.176	+0.452	q
19	Shanne Braspennincx	Netherlands	11.209	+0.485	q
20	Lee Hye-jin	South Korea	11.239	+0.515	q
21	Nicky Degrendele	Belgium	11.248	+0.524	q
22	Kim Won-gyeong	South Korea	11.253	+0.529	q
23	Emma Hinze	Germany	11.255	+0.531	q
24	Tania Calvo	Spain	11.336	+0.612	q
25	Olena Starikova	Ukraine	11.397	+0.673	q
26	Juliana Gaviria	Colombia	11.569	+0.845	q
27	Helena Casas	Spain	11.761	+1.037	q
28	Deborah Herold	India	11.807	+1.083	q
29	Ma Wing Yu	Hong Kong	11.832	+1.108	

- Q = qualified directly for 1/8 finals
- q = qualified for 1/16 finals

=== 1/16 finals ===
Heat winners advanced to the 1/8 finals.

Heat	Rank	Name	Nation	Gap	Notes
1	1	Simona Krupeckaitė	Lithuania		Q
1	2	Deborah Herold	India	+0.134	
2	1	Natasha Hansen	New Zealand		Q
2	2	Helena Casas	Spain	+0.080	
3	1	Kaarle McCulloch	Australia		Q
3	2	Juliana Gaviria	Colombia	+0.358	
4	1	Pauline Grabosch	Germany		Q
4	2	Olena Starikova	Ukraine	+0.063	
5	1	Anastasia Voynova	Russia		Q
5	2	Tania Calvo	Spain	+1.492	
6	1	Daria Shmeleva	Russia		Q
6	2	Emma Hinze	Germany	+0.198	
7	1	Lyubov Basova	Ukraine		Q
7	2	Kim Won-gyeong	South Korea	+0.143	
8	1	Martha Bayona	Colombia		Q
8	2	Nicky Degrendele	Belgium	+0.015	
9	1	Lee Hye-jin	South Korea		Q
9	2	Holly Takos	Australia	+0.013	
10	1	Kate O'Brien	Canada		Q
10	2	Shanne Braspennincx	Netherlands	+0.048	
11	1	Laurine van Riessen	Netherlands		Q
11	2	Miglė Marozaitė	Lithuania	+0.089	
12	1	Lin Junhong	China		Q
12	2	Katy Marchant	Great Britain	+0.028	

=== 1/8 finals ===
Heat winners advanced to the quarterfinals.

Heat	Rank	Name	Nation	Gap	Notes
1	1	Stephanie Morton	Australia		Q
1	2	Lin Junhong	China	+0.103	
2	1	Lee Wai Sze	Hong Kong		Q
2	2	Laurine van Riessen	Netherlands	+0.091	
3	1	Kristina Vogel	Germany		Q
3	2	Kate O'Brien	Canada	+0.352	
4	1	Mathilde Gros	France		Q
4	2	Lee Hye-jin	South Korea	+0.092	
5	1	Simona Krupeckaitė	Lithuania		Q
5	2	Martha Bayona	Colombia	+0.021	
6	1	Lyubov Basova	Ukraine		Q
6	2	Natasha Hansen	New Zealand	+0.099	
7	1	Kaarle McCulloch	Australia		Q
7	2	Daria Shmeleva	Russia	+0.050	
8	1	Anastasia Voynova	Russia		Q
8	2	Pauline Grabosch	Germany	+0.021	

=== Quarterfinals ===
Matches are extended to a best-of-three format hereon; winners proceed to the semifinals.

Heat	Rank	Name	Nation	Race 1	Race 2	Decider (i.r.)	Notes
1	1	Stephanie Morton	Australia	X	X		Q
1	2	Anastasia Voynova	Russia	+0.033	+0.002		
2	1	Lee Wai Sze	Hong Kong	X	X		Q
2	2	Kaarle McCulloch	Australia	+0.213	+0.068		
3	1	Kristina Vogel	Germany	X	X		Q
3	2	Lyubov Basova	Ukraine	+0.140	+0.015		
4	1	Simona Krupeckaitė	Lithuania	X	X		Q
4	2	Mathilde Gros	France	+0.001	+0.116		

=== Semifinals ===
Winners proceeded to the gold medal final; losers proceeded to the bronze medal final.

Heat	Rank	Name	Nation	Race 1	Race 2	Decider (i.r.)	Notes
1	1	Stephanie Morton	Australia	+0.023	X	X	Q
1	2	Simona Krupeckaitė	Lithuania	X	+0.171	+0.174	
2	1	Kristina Vogel	Germany	X	X		Q
2	2	Lee Wai Sze	Hong Kong	+0.038	+0.065		

=== Finals ===
The final classification was determined in the medal finals.

Rank	Name	Nation	Race 1	Race 2	Decider (i.r.)
Gold medal final
1st place, gold medalist(s)	Kristina Vogel	Germany	X	X	
2nd place, silver medalist(s)	Stephanie Morton	Australia	+0.149	+0.147	
Bronze medal final
3rd place, bronze medalist(s)	Lee Wai Sze	Hong Kong	X	X	
4	Simona Krupeckaitė	Lithuania	+0.054	+0.039	
