= 2017 UCI Track Cycling World Championships – Women's team sprint =

Women's team sprint at the 2017 UCI Track Cycling World Championships
- Venue: Hong Kong Velodrome
- Location: Hong Kong
- Dates: 12 April
- Competitors: 25 from 12 nations
- Teams: 12
- Winning time: 32.520

Medalists
gold medal	Daria Shmeleva; Anastasia Voynova	Russia
silver medal	Kaarle McCulloch; Stephanie Morton	Australia
bronze medal	Miriam Welte; Kristina Vogel	Germany

The Women's team sprint competition at the 2017 World Championships was held on 12 April 2017.

== Results ==
=== Qualifying ===
The fastest 8 teams qualified for the first round.

Rank	Name	Nation	Time	Behind	Notes
1	Kristina Vogel; Miriam Welte	Germany	32.356		Q
2	Kaarle McCulloch; Stephanie Morton	Australia	32.785	+0.429	Q
3	Daria Shmeleva; Anastasia Voynova	Russia	32.962	+0.606	Q
4	Guo Shuang; Lin Junhong	China	33.428	+1.072	Q
5	Tania Calvo; Helena Casas	Spain	33.562	+1.206	Q
6	Shanne Braspennincx; Kyra Lamberink	Netherlands	33.582	+1.226	Q
7	Kate O'Brien; Amelia Walsh	Canada	33.703	+1.347	Q
8	Martha Bayona; Juliana Gaviria	Colombia	34.018	+1.662	Q
9	Jessica Salazar; Yuli Verdugo	Mexico	34.072	+1.716	
10	Kim Won-gyeong; Lee Hye-jin	South Korea	34.115	+1.759	
11	Martina Fidanza; Miriam Vece	Italy	34.579	+2.223	
12	Deborah Herold; Alena Reji	India	36.320	+3.964	

- Q = qualified

=== First round ===
First round heats were held as follows:
Heat 1: 4th v 5th fastest
Heat 2: 3rd v 6th fastest
Heat 3: 2nd v 7th fastest
Heat 4: 1st v 8th fastest

The heat winners were ranked on time, from which the top 2 proceeded to the gold medal final and the other 2 proceeded to the bronze medal final.

Rank	Overall rank	Name	Nation	Time	Behind	Notes
1 vs 8
1	3	Miriam Welte; Kristina Vogel	Germany	32.668		QB
2	8	Martha Bayona; Juliana Gaviria	Colombia	33.791	+1.123	
2 vs 7
1	2	Kaarle McCulloch; Stephanie Morton	Australia	32.570		QG
2	5	Amelia Walsh; Kate O'Brien	Canada	33.563	+0.993	
3 vs 6
1	1	Daria Shmeleva; Anastasia Voynova	Russia	32.456		QG
2	6	Kyra Lamberink; Laurine van Riessen	Netherlands	33.580	+1.124	
4 vs 5
1	4	Guo Shuang; Lin Junhong	China	33.289		QB
2	7	Tania Calvo; Helena Casas	Spain	33.653	+0.364	

- QG = qualified for gold medal final
- QB = qualified for bronze medal final

=== Finals ===
The final classification was decided in the medal finals.

Rank	Name	Nation	Time	Behind	Notes
Gold medal final
1st place, gold medalist(s)	Daria Shmeleva; Anastasia Voynova	Russia	32.520		
2nd place, silver medalist(s)	Kaarle McCulloch; Stephanie Morton	Australia	32.649	+0.129	
Bronze medal final
3rd place, bronze medalist(s)	Miriam Welte; Kristina Vogel	Germany	32.609		
4	Guo Shuang; Lin Junhong	China	33.309	+0.700	
