= 2017 UEC European Track Championships – Women's keirin =

Women's keirin at the 2017 UEC European Track Championships
- UEC European Champion jersey
- Venue: Velodrom, Berlin
- Date: 21 October
- Competitors: 22 from 13 nations

Medalists
gold medal	Kristina Vogel	Germany
silver medal	Simona Krupeckaitė	Lithuania
bronze medal	Lyubov Basova	Ukraine

The Women's keirin was held on 21 October 2017.

== Results ==
=== First round ===
Top two in each heat qualified directly for the semi-finals; the remainder went to the first round repechage.

==== Heat 1 ====
Rank	Name	Nation	Notes
1	Laurine van Riessen	Netherlands	Q
2	Nicky Degrendele	Belgium	Q
3	Julita Jagodzińska	Poland	
4	Tania Calvo	Spain	
REL	Daria Shmeleva	Russia	

==== Heat 3 ====
Rank	Name	Nation	Notes
1	Kristina Vogel	Germany	Q
2	Mathilde Gros	France	Q
3	Sára Kaňkovská	Czech Republic	
4	Katy Marchant	Great Britain	
5	Simona Krupeckaitė	Lithuania	
6	Elena Bissolati	Italy	

==== Heat 2 ====
Rank	Name	Nation	Notes
1	Anastasia Voynova	Russia	Q
2	Lyubov Basova	Ukraine	Q
3	Robyn Stewart	Ireland	
4	Sandie Clair	France	
5	Miglė Marozaitė	Lithuania	

==== Heat 4 ====
Rank	Name	Nation	Notes
1	Pauline Grabosch	Germany	Q
2	Shanne Braspennincx	Netherlands	Q
3	Olena Starikova	Ukraine	
4	Helena Casas	Spain	
5	Urszula Łoś	Poland	
6	Sophie Capewell	Great Britain	

=== First round Repechage ===
Heat winners qualified for the semi-finals.

==== Heat 1 ====
Rank	Name	Nation	Notes
1	Simona Krupeckaitė	Lithuania	Q
2	Julita Jagodzińska	Poland	
3	Helena Casas	Spain	

==== Heat 3 ====
Rank	Name	Nation	Notes
1	Daria Shmeleva	Russia	Q
2	Sára Kaňkovská	Czech Republic	
3	Sandie Clair	France	
4	Sophie Capewell	Great Britain	

==== Heat 2 ====
Rank	Name	Nation	Notes
1	Katy Marchant	Great Britain	Q
2	Urszula Łoś	Poland	
3	Robyn Stewart	Ireland	

==== Heat 4 ====
Rank	Name	Nation	Notes
1	Tania Calvo	Spain	Q
2	Elena Bissolati	Italy	
3	Miglė Marozaitė	Lithuania	
DNS	Olena Starikova	Ukraine	

=== Semi-finals ===
First three riders in each semi qualified for the final; the remainder went to the small final (for places 7–12).

==== Semi-final 1 ====
Rank	Name	Nation	Notes
1	Lyubov Basova	Ukraine	Q
2	Simona Krupeckaitė	Lithuania	Q
3	Mathilde Gros	France	Q
4	Laurine van Riessen	Netherlands	
5	Pauline Grabosch	Germany	
6	Daria Shmeleva	Russia	

==== Semi-final 2 ====
Rank	Name	Nation	Notes
1	Kristina Vogel	Germany	Q
2	Anastasia Voynova	Russia	Q
3	Tania Calvo	Spain	Q
REL	Nicky Degrendele	Belgium	
DNF	Shanne Braspennincx	Netherlands	
DNF	Katy Marchant	Great Britain	

=== Finals ===
The final classification is determined in the ranking finals.

==== Final (places 7-12) ====
Rank	Name	Nation	Notes
7	Pauline Grabosch	Germany	
8	Daria Shmeleva	Russia	
9	Nicky Degrendele	Belgium	
10	Laurine van Riessen	Netherlands	
DNS	Shanne Braspennincx	Netherlands	
DNS	Katy Marchant	Great Britain	

==== Final (places 1-6) ====
Rank	Name	Nation	Notes
1st place, gold medalist(s)	Kristina Vogel	Germany	
2nd place, silver medalist(s)	Simona Krupeckaitė	Lithuania	
3rd place, bronze medalist(s)	Lyubov Basova	Ukraine	
4	Mathilde Gros	France	
5	Tania Calvo	Spain	
6	Anastasia Voynova	Russia	
