= Olympic record progression track cycling – Women's team sprint =

Women's 500m track cycling record

This is an overview of the progression of the Olympic track cycling record of the women's 500 m team sprint as recognised by the Union Cycliste Internationale (UCI).

The women's 500 m team sprint was introduced at the 2012 Summer Olympics.

== Progression ==
=== 500 m ===
♦ denotes a performance that is also a current world record. Statistics are correct as of the end of the 2020 Summer Olympics.

During the Qualification session there were several teams who rode a new best time and so had temporary the Olympic Record. They are not listed as Olympic Record holders because they did not win the qualification session. These countries who had temporary the Olympic record are:

- Heat 1: Venezuela: Daniela Larreal, Mariaesthela Vilera in a time of 34.320
- Heat 2: Ukraine: Lyubov Shulika, Olena Tsyos in a time of 33.708
- Heat 3: Netherlands: Yvonne Hijgenaar, Willy Kanis in a time of 33.253
- Heat 4: Great Britain: Victoria Pendleton, Jessica Varnish in a time of 32.526

Time	Cyclists	Location	Track	Date	Meet	Ref
32.447	China; Jinjie Gong; Guo Shuang	London (GBR), London Velopark	Indoor track	2 August 2012	2012 Summer Olympics; Qualification	
32.422	China; Jinjie Gong; Guo Shuang	London (GBR), London Velopark	Indoor track	2 August 2012	2012 Summer Olympics; First round	
32.305	China; Gong Jinjie; Zhong Tianshi	Rio de Janeiro (Brazil) , Rio Olympic Velodrome	Indoor track	12 August 2016	2016 Summer Olympics; Qualification	
31.928	China; Gong Jinjie; Zhong Tianshi	Rio de Janeiro (Brazil) , Rio Olympic Velodrome	Indoor track	12 August 2016	2016 Summer Olympics; First round	
♦ 31.804	China; Bao Shanju; Zhong Tianshi	(Japan) Izu Velodrome, Izu	Indoor track	2 August 2021	2020 Summer Olympics; First round	

=== 750 m ===
♦ denotes a performance that is also a current world record. Statistics are correct as of the end of the 2024 Summer Olympics.

Time	Cyclists	Location	Track	Date	Meet	Ref
45.472	Great Britain; Katy Marchant; Sophie Capewell; Emma Finucane	(France) Vélodrome National, Saint-Quentin-en-Yvelines	Indoor track	5 August 2024	2024 Summer Olympics; Qualification	
45.338	Great Britain; Katy Marchant; Emma Finucane; Sophie Capewell	(France) Vélodrome National, Saint-Quentin-en-Yvelines	Indoor track	5 August 2024	2024 Summer Olympics; First round	
♦ 45.186	Great Britain; Sophie Capewell; Emma Finucane; Katy Marchant	(France) Vélodrome National, Saint-Quentin-en-Yvelines	Indoor track	5 August 2024	2024 Summer Olympics; Finals	
