= Cycling at the 2012 Summer Olympics – Women's team sprint =

Women's cycling team sprint at the Games of the XXX Olympiad
- Venue: London Velopark
- Date: 2 August
- Competitors: 20 from 10 nations
- Winning time: 32.798

Medalists
1st place, gold medalist(s)		Kristina Vogel; Miriam Welte	Germany
2nd place, silver medalist(s)		Gong Jinjie; Guo Shuang	China
3rd place, bronze medalist(s)		Kaarle McCulloch; Anna Meares	Australia

The women's cycling team sprint at the 2012 Olympic Games in London took place at the London Velopark on 2 August.

Kristina Vogel and Miriam Welte of Germany won the gold medal with a time of 32.798 seconds. China won the silver medal and Australia took bronze.

== Competition format ==
The team sprint is a two-lap race between two teams of two cyclists, starting on opposite sides of the track. Each member of the team must lead for one of the laps.

The tournament consisted of an initial qualifying round. The top eight teams advanced to the first round. The first round comprised head-to-head races based on seeding (1st vs. 8th, 2nd vs. 7th, etc.). The winners of those four heats advanced to the medal round, with the two fastest winners competing in the gold medal final and the two slower winners facing off for bronze.

== Schedule ==
All times are British Summer Time

Date	Time	Round
Thursday 2 August 2012	16:00	Qualifications and final

== Results ==
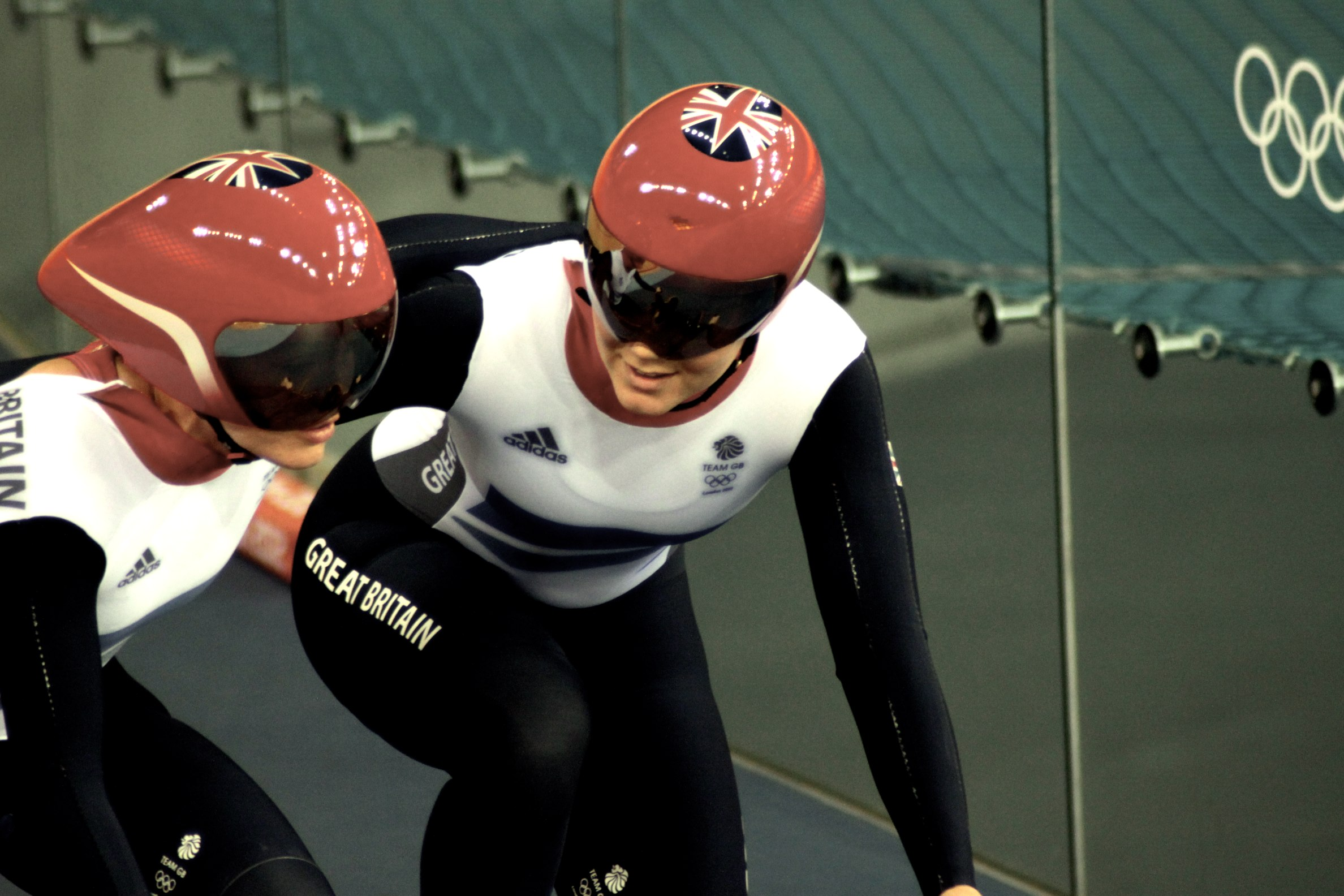
British Pendleton and Varnish: second in the qualification but relegated in the first round

=== Qualification ===
Rank	Heat	Country	Cyclists	Result	Notes
1	5	China	Gong Jinjie; Guo Shuang	32.447	Q, WR, OR
2	4	Great Britain	Victoria Pendleton; Jessica Varnish	32.526	Q. ER
3	5	Germany	Kristina Vogel; Miriam Welte	32.630	Q
4	4	Australia	Kaarle McCulloch; Anna Meares	32.825	Q
5	3	Netherlands	Yvonne Hijgenaar; Willy Kanis	33.253	Q
6	3	France	Sandie Clair; Virginie Cueff	33.638	Q
7	2	Ukraine	Lyubov Shulika; Olena Tsyos	33.708	Q
8	1	Venezuela	Daniela Larreal; Mariaesthela Vilera	34.320	Q
9	1	South Korea	Lee Eun-Ji; Lee Hye-Jin	34.636	
10	2	Colombia	Diana García; Juliana Gaviria	34.870	

- The ride of Varnish and Pendleton for Great Britain took place prior to that of Gong and Guo of China, and broke the existing world record. It was then immediately beaten by the Chinese team's time in the next heat.

=== First round ===
Rank	Heat	Country	Cyclists	Result	Notes
1	4	China	Gong Jinjie; Guo Shuang	32.422	WR, OR
2	2	Germany	Kristina Vogel; Miriam Welte	32.701	
3	1	Australia	Kaarle McCulloch; Anna Meares	32.806	
4	3	Ukraine	Lyubov Shulika; Olena Tsyos	33.620	
5	1	Netherlands	Yvonne Hijgenaar; Willy Kanis	33.090	
6	2	France	Sandie Clair; Virginie Cueff	33.707	
7	4	Venezuela	Daniela Larreal; Mariaesthela Vilera	34.415	
8	3	Great Britain	Victoria Pendleton; Jessica Varnish	~~32.567~~	REL*

- Great Britain won their heat with a time which would have qualified them for the gold medal match, but they were relegated for an early exchange.

=== Finals ===
==== Final bronze medal ====
Rank	Country	Cyclists	Result	Notes
3rd place, bronze medalist(s)	Australia	Kaarle McCulloch; Anna Meares	32.727	
4	Ukraine	Lyubov Shulika; Olena Tsyos	33.491	

==== Final gold medal ====
Rank	Country	Cyclists	Result	Notes
1st place, gold medalist(s)	Germany	Kristina Vogel; Miriam Welte	32.798	
2nd place, silver medalist(s)	China	Gong Jinjie; Guo Shuang	~~32.619~~	REL*

- China had the best time in the final, but were relegated for an early exchange.
