= Eleni Klapanara =

Greek cyclist (born 1973)

Personal information
- Born: 2 November 1973 (age 52)

Cycling career
- Sport: Cycling
- Discipline: Track cycling
- Role: Rider
- Rider type: sprinter

Eleni Klapanara (born 2 November 1973) is a Greek female track cyclist, and part of the national team. She competed in the team sprint event at the 2010 UCI Track Cycling World Championships.
