= Kristina Vogel =

German track cyclist

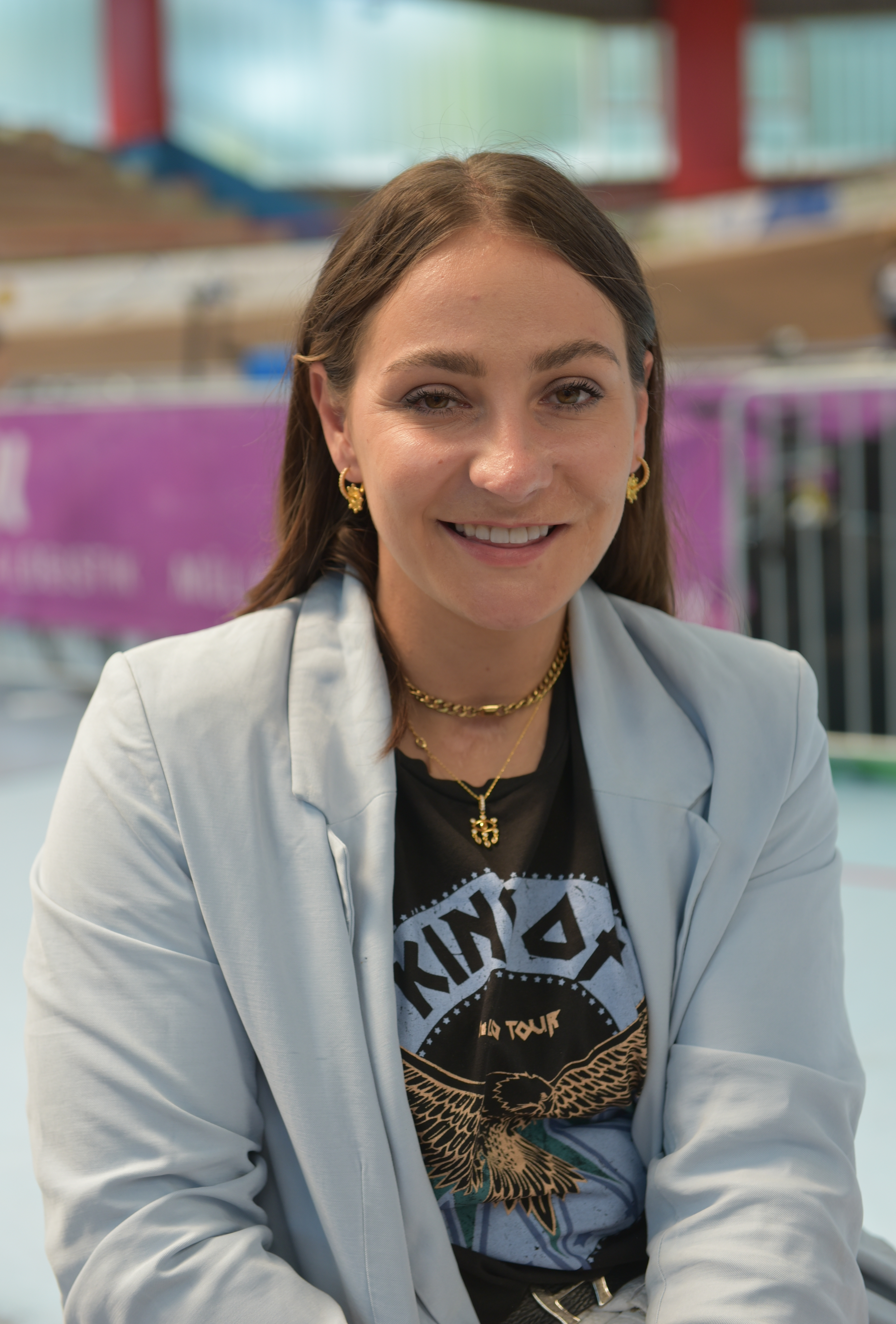
- Vogel in 2022

Personal information
- Born: 10 November 1990 (age 35) Leninskoye, Bishkek, Kirghiz SSR
- Height: 1.60 m (5 ft 3 in)

Cycling career
- Sport: Cycling
- Discipline: Track
- Role: Rider
- Rider type: Sprinter
Medal record
Olympic Games
Gold medal – first place	2012 London	Team Sprint
Gold medal – first place	2016 Rio de Janeiro	Sprint
Bronze medal – third place	2016 Rio de Janeiro	Team Sprint
World Championships
Gold medal – first place	2012 Melbourne	Team sprint
Gold medal – first place	2013 Minsk	Team sprint
Gold medal – first place	2014 Cali	Sprint
Gold medal – first place	2014 Cali	Team sprint
Gold medal – first place	2014 Cali	Keirin
Gold medal – first place	2015 Yvelines	Sprint
Gold medal – first place	2016 London	Keirin
Gold medal – first place	2017 Hong Kong	Keirin
Gold medal – first place	2017 Hong Kong	Sprint
Gold medal – first place	2018 Apeldoorn	Sprint
Gold medal – first place	2018 Apeldoorn	Team sprint
Silver medal – second place	2013 Minsk	Sprint
Bronze medal – third place	2012 Melbourne	Keirin
Bronze medal – third place	2016 London	Team sprint
Bronze medal – third place	2016 London	Sprint
Bronze medal – third place	2017 Hong Kong	Team sprint
European Championships
Gold medal – first place	2013 Apeldoorn	Sprint
Gold medal – first place	2014 Baie-Mahault	Keirin
Gold medal – first place	2017 Berlin	Keirin
Gold medal – first place	2017 Berlin	Sprint
Silver medal – second place	2010 Pruszków	Sprint
Silver medal – second place	2013 Apeldoorn	Keirin
Silver medal – second place	2013 Apeldoorn	Team sprint
Silver medal – second place	2014 Baie-Mahault	Team sprint
Silver medal – second place	2015 Grenchen	Team sprint
Silver medal – second place	2017 Berlin	Team sprint
Bronze medal – third place	2010 Pruszków	Team Sprint
Bronze medal – third place	2011 Apeldoorn	Team sprint
Bronze medal – third place	2014 Baie-Mahault	Sprint
Bronze medal – third place	2015 Grenchen	Sprint

Kristina Vogel (born 10 November 1990) is a former German track cyclist. During her career, she won two gold medals and a bronze at the Olympic Games, and became an eleven-time UCI World Champion. She was paralysed following a crash in June 2018.

== Life and career ==
Vogel was born in Leninskoye, a district of Bishkek, the capital of Kyrgyzstan, and moved to Germany with her parents when she was six months old. In 2007 and 2008 she competed at the Junior European and World Championships and became a six-time junior world champion and two-time junior European champion.

In April 2009, Vogel was seriously injured after a collision with a minibus when riding on the roads near her home in Erfurt. She was in an artificial coma for two days. She recovered to compete at the 2010 UCI Track Cycling World Championships, where she finished fifth in the individual sprint and sixth in the team sprint alongside Miriam Welte. She also competed at the 2011 UCI Track Cycling World Championships.

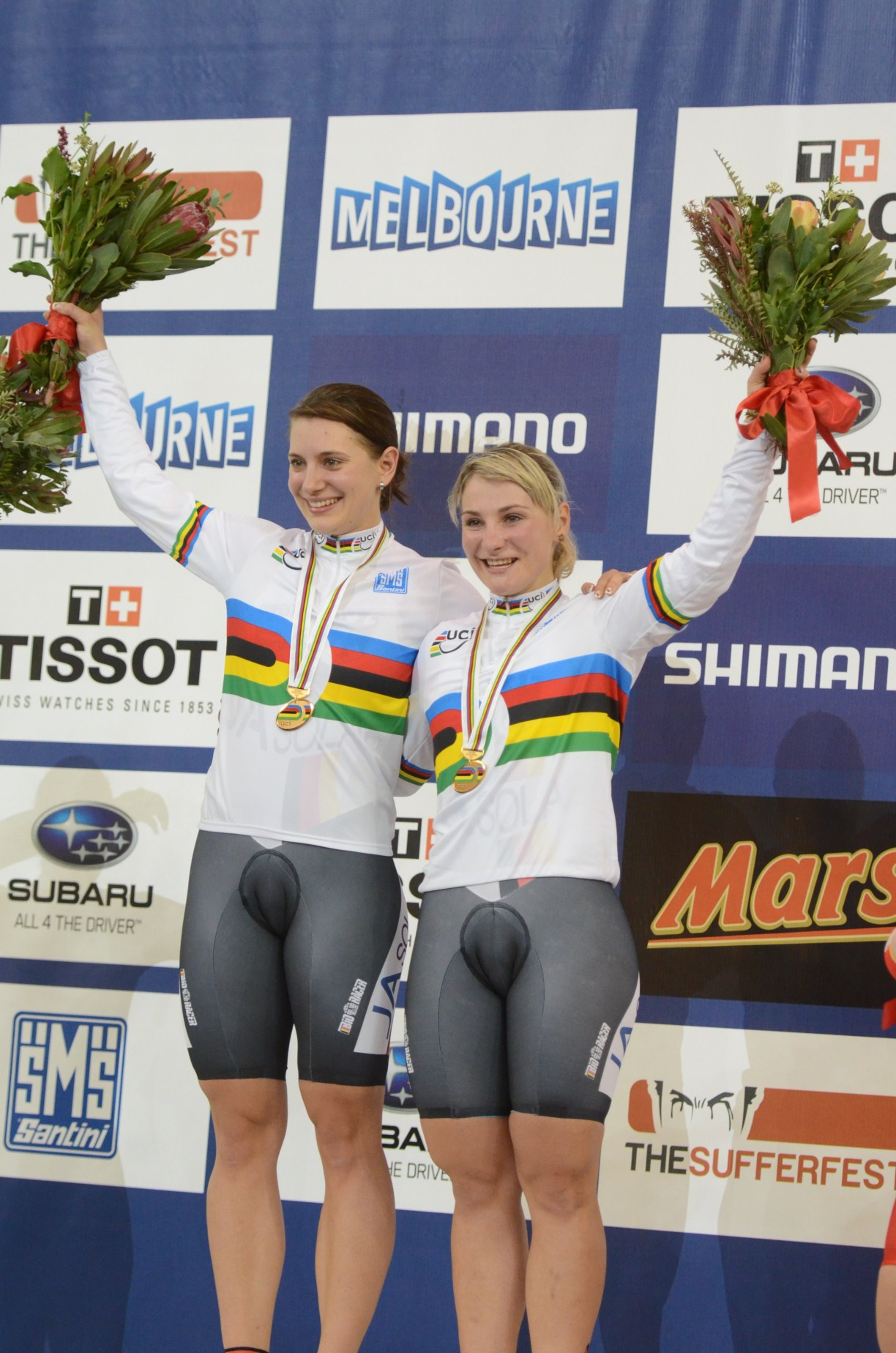
Welte and Vogel on the podium at the 2012 Track World Championships

At the 2012 UCI Track Cycling World Championships in Melbourne, Vogel and Welte won the gold medal in the team sprint. They set a world record in qualifying which they broke again in the final. Vogel and Welte went on to win the first ever Olympic gold medal in the women's team sprint later that year in London, benefiting from competitors being relegated in both the semifinal and final. At the 2016 Summer Olympics, she won another gold, in the women's sprint, and a bronze medal in the women's team sprint again with Miriam Welte.

On 26 June 2018, in the Cottbus velodrome, Vogel collided at high speed with a Dutch junior cyclist who was practising a standing start. The heavy impact on the concrete floor caused several fractures, severing her spinal cord at the seventh thoracic vertebrae and consequently caused paraplegia. Vogel's teammate Maximilian Levy was the first to come to her aid, and following the accident, he and fellow cyclist Max Dörnbach, using the hashtag #staystrongkristina, went on to raise €119,752 for her recovery. The Dutch cyclist was uninjured, but Vogel was left paralysed.

In addition to her track cycling career, Vogel was a part-time police officer before her accident. In 2019, she entered politics, standing for election as a candidate for the Christian Democratic Union of Germany in Erfurt city council elections.

== Major results ==
2008
UCI Juniors Track World Championships

1st Keirin
1st Sprint
1st 500m time trial

2nd Sprint, Grand Prix de Vitesse de Saint Denis

2010
UEC European Track Championships

2nd Sprint
3rd Team sprint (with Miriam Welte)

2011
3rd Team sprint (with Miriam Welte), UEC European Track Championships

2012
Olympic Games

1st Team sprint (with Miriam Welte)

UCI World Championships

1st Team sprint (with Miriam Welte)
3rd Keirin

2013
UCI World Championships

1st Team sprint (with Miriam Welte)
2nd Sprint

UEC European Track Championships

1st Sprint
2nd Keirin
2nd Team sprint (with Miriam Welte)

2014
UEC European Track Championships

1st Keirin
2nd Team sprint (with Miriam Welte)
3rd Sprint

Cottbuser SprintCup

1st Keirin
1st Sprint
1st 500m Time Trial

Memorial of Alexander Lesnikov

1st Keirin
1st Sprint
1st 500m Time Trial

Cottbuser SprintCup (2)

1st Keirin
2nd Sprint

GP von Deutschland im Sprint

1st Keirin
1st Sprint

Cottbuser Nächte

1st Keirin
1st Sprint
1st Team Sprint (with Miriam Welte)

1st Sprint, Track-Cycling Challenge Grenchen

2015
UCI World Championships

1st Sprint

Cottbuser SprintCup

1st Keirin
2nd Sprint

GP von Deutschland im Sprint

1st Keirin
3rd Team Sprint (with Miriam Welte)

Internationale Radsport Meeting

1st Keirin
1st Sprint
1st 500m Time Trial

1st Keirin, Cottbuser Nächte
UEC European Track Championships

2nd Team sprint (with Miriam Welte)
3rd Sprint

2nd Sprint, Cottbuser SprintCup
2nd Sprint, Dudenhofen
3rd Keirin, Öschelbronn

2016
Olympic Games

1st Sprint
3rd Team sprint (with Miriam Welte)

UCI World Championships

1st Keirin
3rd Team sprint (with Miriam Welte)
3rd Sprint

GP von Deutschland im Sprint

1st Keirin
1st Sprint
1st Team Sprint (with Miriam Welte)

Cottbuser SprintCup

1st Sprint
2nd Keirin
3rd 500m Time Trial

2017
UCI World Championships

1st Keirin
1st Sprint
3rd Team sprint (with Miriam Welte)

UEC European Track Championships

1st Keirin
1st Sprint
2nd Team sprint (with Miriam Welte)

1st Sprint, Round 1, (Pruszków) Track Cycling World Cup
1st Sprint, Öschelbronn
1st Keirin, Oberhausen
1st Sprint, Dudenhofen
Cottbuser SprintCup

1st Keirin
1st Sprint

1st Sprint GP von Deutschland im Sprint
National Track Championships

1st Keirin
1st Sprint
1st Team Sprint (with Pauline Grabosch)
3rd 500m Time Trial
