= Victoria Williamson =

British track cyclist and bobsledder

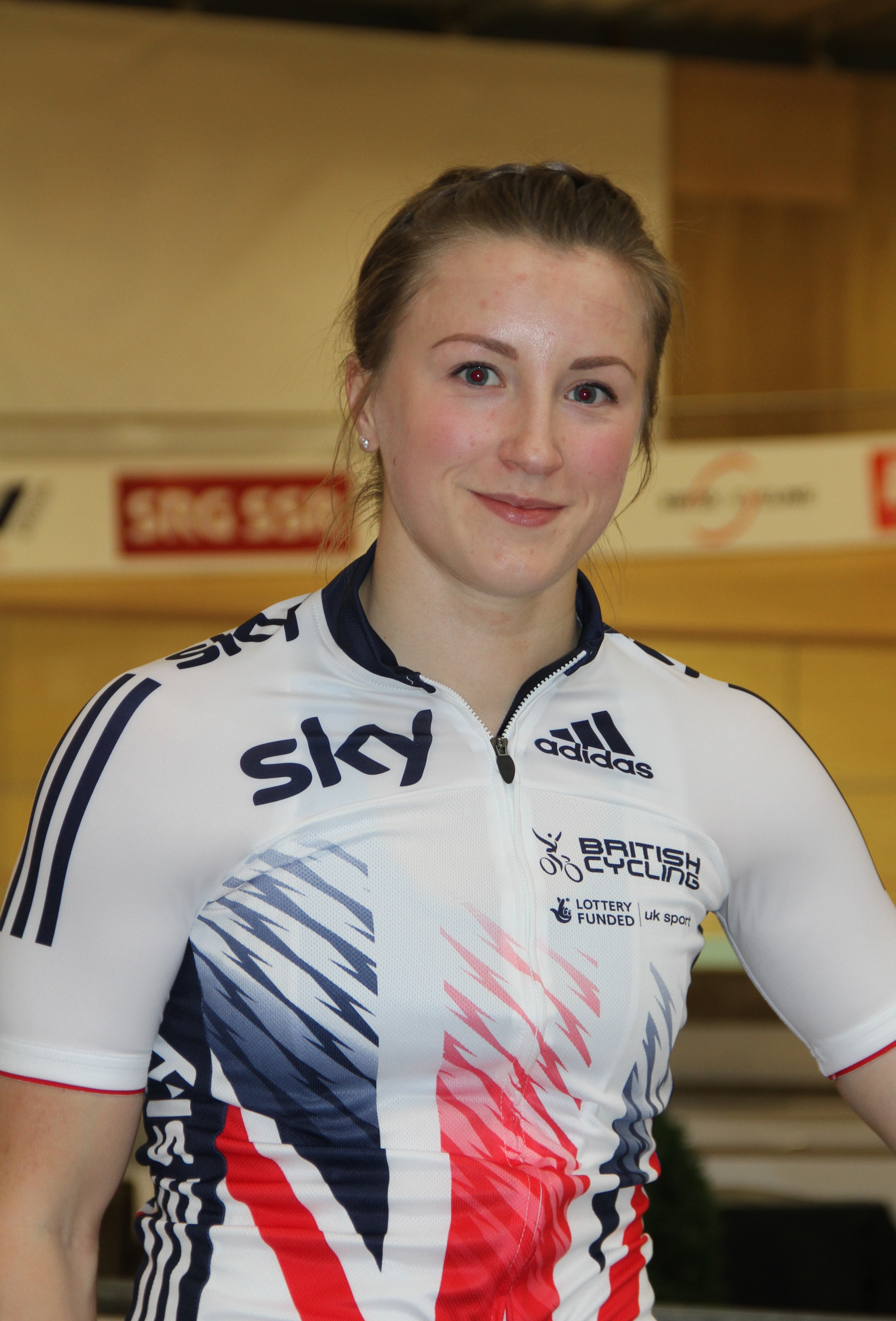
- Williamson in 2015

Personal information
- Full name: Victoria Eve Williamson
- Nickname: Vics
- Born: 15 September 1993 (age 33) Hevingham, Norfolk, England
- Height: 1.63 m (5 ft 4 in)
- Weight: 62 kg (137 lb)

Cycling career
- Sport: Cycling
- Current team: VC Norwich
- Discipline: Track
- Role: Rider
- Rider type: Sprint Track
Medal record
Women's track cycling
Representing Great Britain
World Championships
Bronze medal – third place	2013 Minsk	Team sprint

Victoria Eve Williamson (born 15 September 1993) is a former English bobsledder and track cyclist who specialised in the sprint disciplines. In 2013, with Rebecca James, she won the bronze medal in the team sprint at the World Track Cycling Championships. She retired from competitive sport in 2026.

== Early life ==
Williamson was educated at Norwich High School for Girls. At the suggestion of one of her coaches at the City of Norwich Athletic Club, she switched from athletics to cycling in 2008. She entered the Girls4Gold programme, a group that searches for talented athletes with a potential for cycling, before being accepted into the Olympic Development Programme (ODP). She then progressed onto the elite Podium Programme two years later, and made her senior debut at the 2013 World Championships in Minsk.

== Career ==
At the 2011 Juniors Track World Championships in Moscow, she won a silver medal in the 500m time trial, a bronze medal in the sprint and came fifth in the keirin. She made her senior world debut very shortly after, and won a bronze medal with partner Becky James in the team sprint at the 2013 Track World Championships in Minsk, Belarus. In 2017 she signed with Under Armour.

=== Crash ===
In January 2016, Williamson was seriously injured in a crash with Dutch rider Elis Ligtlee during an omnium sprint race at the Six Days of Rotterdam (Zesdaagse Rotterdam). The resulting collision with a barrier left Williamson with a broken neck and back, dislocating her pelvis and slipping a disc in her neck.

Williamson was left with a loss of feeling in her left leg, her starting leg, due to a trapped nerve but was hoping for full feeling by mid 2018. During this period she married Oliver Barnes. She hoped to complete her rehabilitation by the end of January and to race at the 2018 Commonwealth Games.

=== Return to track cycling ===
2018 saw the separation of her marriage. In late January 2019, three years after suffering career-threatening injuries, Williamson returned to competition. The now 25-year-old took part in the GB Cycling Team for sprint events for the 2018–19 UCI Track Cycling World Cup in Hong Kong. and qualified for the 2019 Track World Championships.

=== Switch to bobsleigh ===
In December 2019 Williamson announced that she was switching from cycling to bobsleigh, having participated in her first training camp with the British bobsleigh team.

Williamson retired from professional sport in January 2026.

== Palmarès ==
2009
2nd Sprint, British National Track Championships – U16

2010

1st Sprint, British National Track Championships – Junior
2nd 500m TT, British National Track Championships – Junior

2011
2nd 500m TT, UCI Track World Championships – Junior
3rd Sprint, UCI Track World Championships – Junior
1st Sprint, British National Track Championships – Junior
1st 500m TT, British National Track Championships – Junior
3rd Sprint, British National Track Championships
3rd Keirin, British National Track Championships

2012
2nd Sprint, British National Track Championships
2nd Keirin, British National Track Championships
2nd 500m TT, British National Track Championships

2013
3rd Team sprint, UCI Track World Championships (with Becky James)
2nd 500m TT, British National Track Championships
3rd Team sprint, UEC European U23 Track Championships (with Becky James)

2014
Open des Nations sur Piste de Roubaix

1st Team Sprint (with Jessica Varnish)
3rd Sprint

Track Cycling World Cup

3rd Team sprint, Round 3, Guadalajara (with Dannielle Khan)

2nd Sprint, Revolution – Round 4, Manchester
2nd, British National Team Sprint Championships (with Katy Marchant)
2nd 500m time trial, British National Track Championships
3rd Individual sprint, British National Track Championships

2015
Revolution

1st Sprint – Round 4, Glasgow
2nd Keirin – Round 4, Glasgow

2nd British National Team Sprint Championships (with Shanaze Reade)
2nd 500m time trial, British National Track Championships
3rd Individual Sprint, British National Track Championships
UEC European U23 Track Championships

2nd Team Sprint (with Katy Marchant)
3rd Sprint
