= Hiroko Ishii =

Japanese track cyclist (born 1986)

Personal information
- Born: 9 January 1986 (age 40)

Cycling career
- Sport: Cycling
- Discipline: Track cycling
- Role: Rider
- Rider type: sprint

Hiroko Ishii (born 9 January 1986) is a Japanese female track cyclist. She competed in the sprint event at the 2012 and 2013 UCI Track Cycling World Championships.

== Major results ==
2014
Japan Track Cup 2

2nd Keirin
2nd Sprint
