= Olga Streltsova =

Russian cyclist (born 1987)

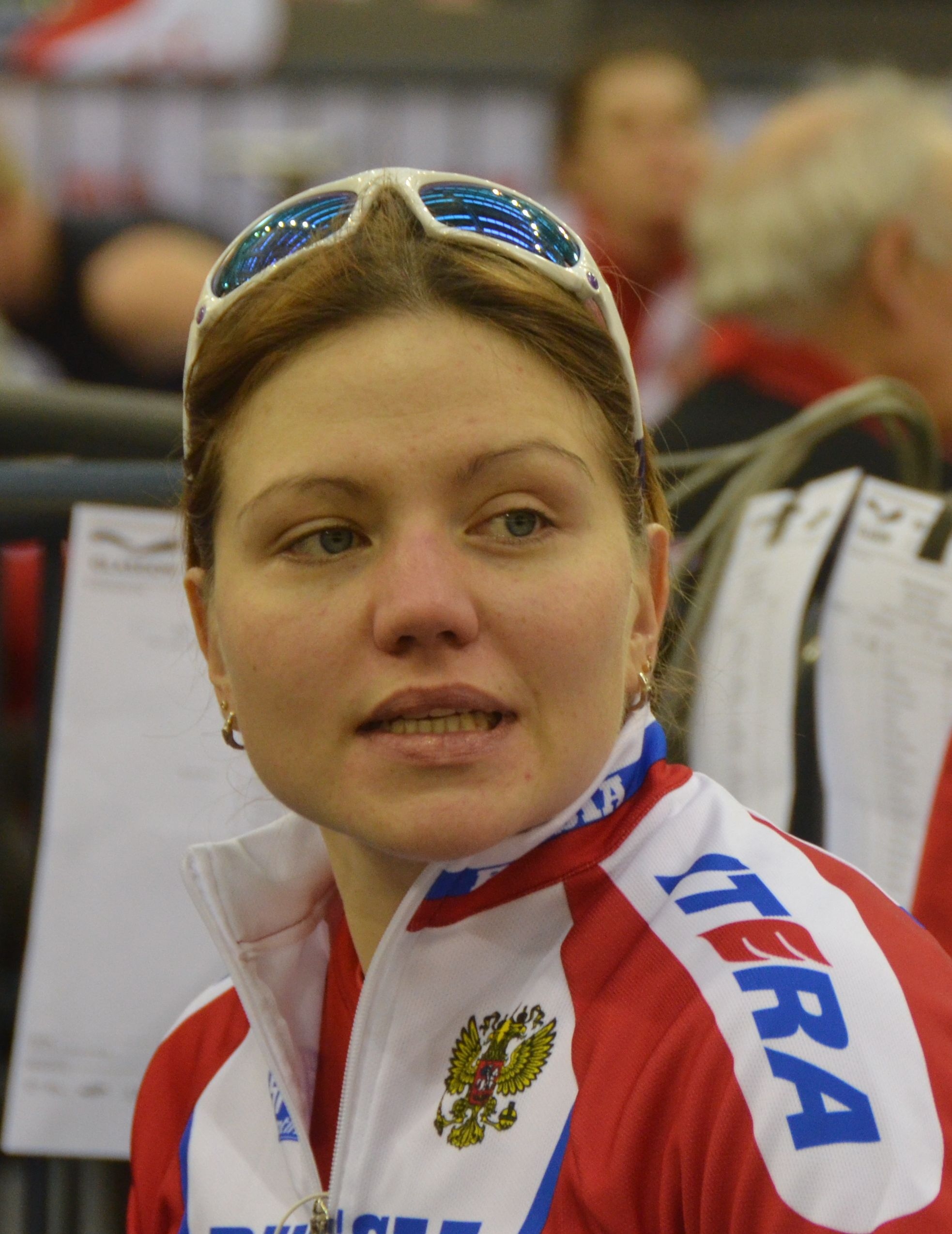
- Streltsova in 2012

Personal information
- Born: 25 February 1987 (age 39)

Cycling career
- Sport: Cycling
- Discipline: Track cycling
- Role: Rider
- Rider type: sprinter

Olga Alexandrovna Streltsova (Russian: Ольга Александровна Стрельцова; born 25 February 1987) is a Russian female track cyclist. She competed at the 2009, 2010, 2011, 2013, and 2014 UCI Track Cycling World Championships.

On 29 May 2011 she broke the track cycling world record of the 500 m time trial, the first record set as a non-amateur record in a time of 29.481. She broke the record again on 30 May 2014 in a time of 29.234 and is till the world record holder.

== Career results ==
2008
3rd Team Sprint, UEC European U23 Track Championships (with Yulia Kosheleva)
2009
UEC European U23 Track Championships

2nd Sprint
2nd Team Sprint (with Victoria Baranova)
3rd Keirin

2014
Grand Prix of Tula

2nd Team Sprint (with Elena Brejniva)
3rd Sprint

2nd Team Sprint, Memorial of Alexander Lesnikov (with Elena Brejniva)

== See also ==
- World record progression track cycling – Women's flying 500 m time trial
