= Elena Brejniva =

Russian cyclist

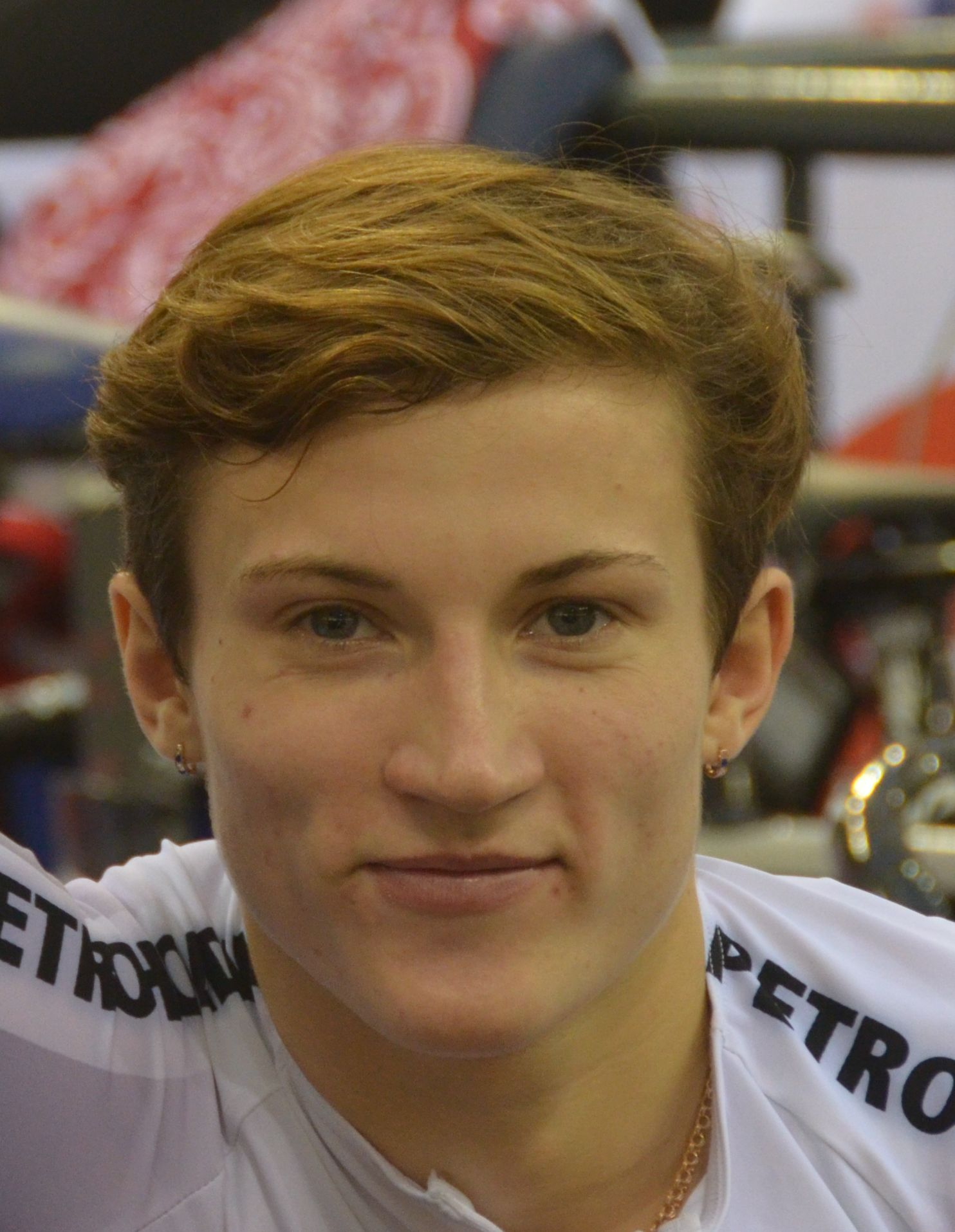
- Brejniva in 2012

Personal information
- Born: 4 January 1990 (age 36)

Cycling career
- Sport: Cycling
- Role: Rider
- Rider type: sprinter

Elena Viktorovna Brejniva (Russian: Елена Викторовна Брежнива; born 4 January 1990) is a Russian professional racing cyclist. She rode at the 2012, 2014 and 2015 UCI Track Cycling World Championships.

== Career results ==
2011
2nd Team Sprint, UEC European U23 Track Championships (with Ekaterina Gnidenko)
2012
UEC European U23 Track Championships

2nd Keirin
2nd 500m Time Trial

2013
Grand Prix of Russian Helicopters

3rd Keirin
3rd Sprint
3rd Team Sprint (with Olga Hudenko)

2014
UEC European Track Championships

1st Team Sprint (with Anastasia Voynova and Daria Shmeleva)
2nd Keirin

2nd Team Sprint, Grand Prix of Tula (with Olga Streltsova)
2nd Team Sprint, Memorial of Alexander Lesnikov (with Olga Streltsova)
2nd 500m Time Trial, Cottbuser SprintCup
3rd Keirin, GP von Deutschland im Sprint
Grand Prix of Russian Helicopters

3rd Keirin
3rd Sprint

2015
Panevezys

2nd 500m Time Trial
3rd Keirin
3rd Sprint

Grand Prix Minsk

1st Team Sprint (with Victoria Tyumneva)
2nd 500m Time Trial

3rd Team Sprint, Grand Prix of Tula (with Victoria Tyumneva)
