= Gintarė Gaivenytė =

Lithuanian cyclist (born 1986)

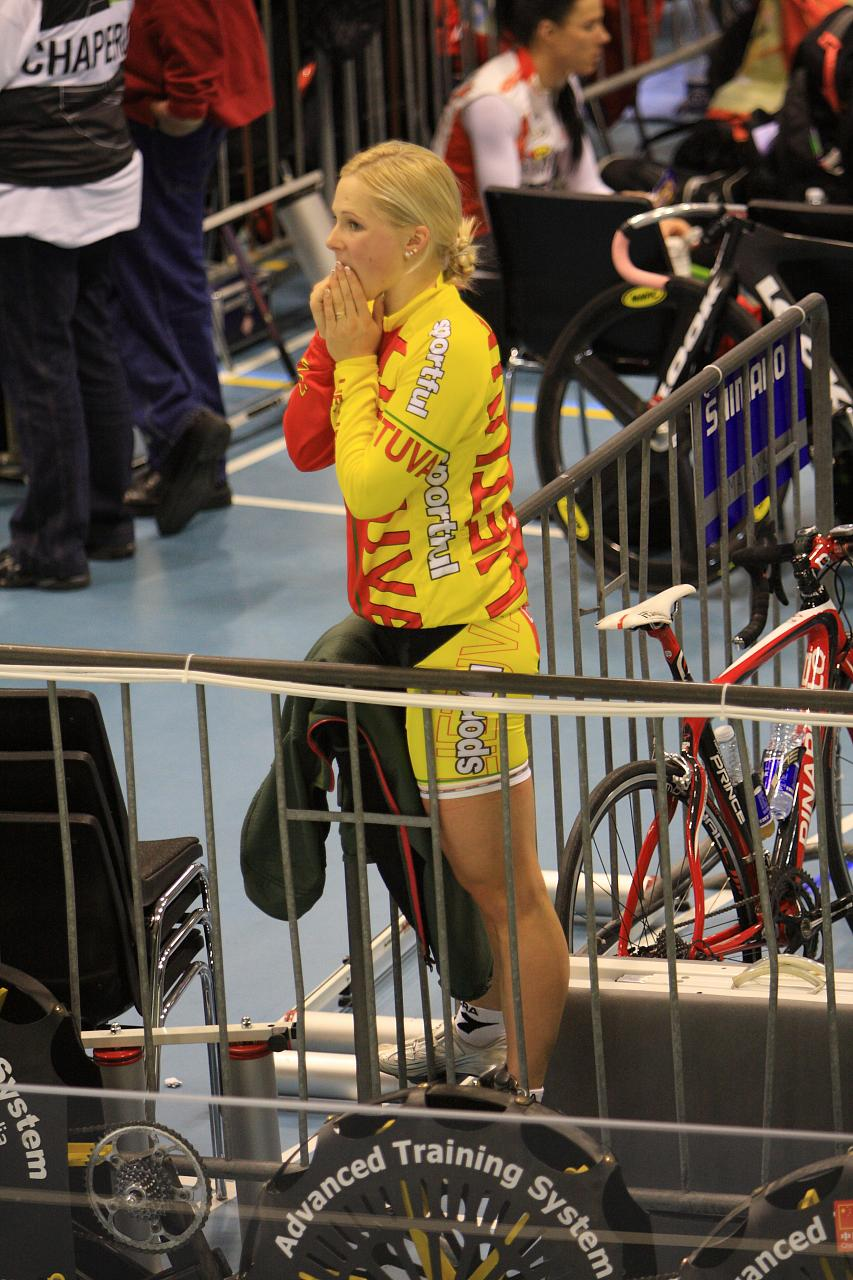
- Gintarė Gaivenytė in 2010 Track Championships

Personal information
- Full name: Gintarė Gaivenytė
- Born: 23 April 1986 (age 40) Utena, Lithuanian SSR

Cycling career
- Sport: Cycling
- Discipline: Track
Medal record
Representing Lithuania
Women's track cycling
World Championships
Bronze medal – third place	2009 Pruszków	Team sprint
Bronze medal – third place	2010 Ballerup	Team sprint
European Championships
Gold medal – first place	2012 Panevėžys	Team sprint

Gintarė Gaivenytė (born 23 April 1986) is a Lithuanian racing cyclist.

== Palmarès ==
=== Track ===
Date	Placing	Event	Competition	Location	Country
12 December 2008	3	Team sprint	World Cup	Cali	Colombia
17 January 2009	2	Team sprint	World Cup	Beijing	China
29 March 2009	Bronze	Team sprint	World championships	Pruszków	Poland
11 December 2009	2	Team sprint	World Cup	Cali	Colombia
25 March 2010	Bronze	Team sprint	World championships	Ballerup	Denmark

2013
Panevezys

1st Keirin
1st Sprint

2014
Polish Cup

2nd Sprint
2nd Team Sprint (with Migle Marozaite)
3rd Keirin

2015
3rd 500m Time Trial, Panevezys

=== Road ===
Date	Placing	Event	Competition
28 June 2008	3	Road Race	National championship
