= Olivia Montauban =

French cyclist

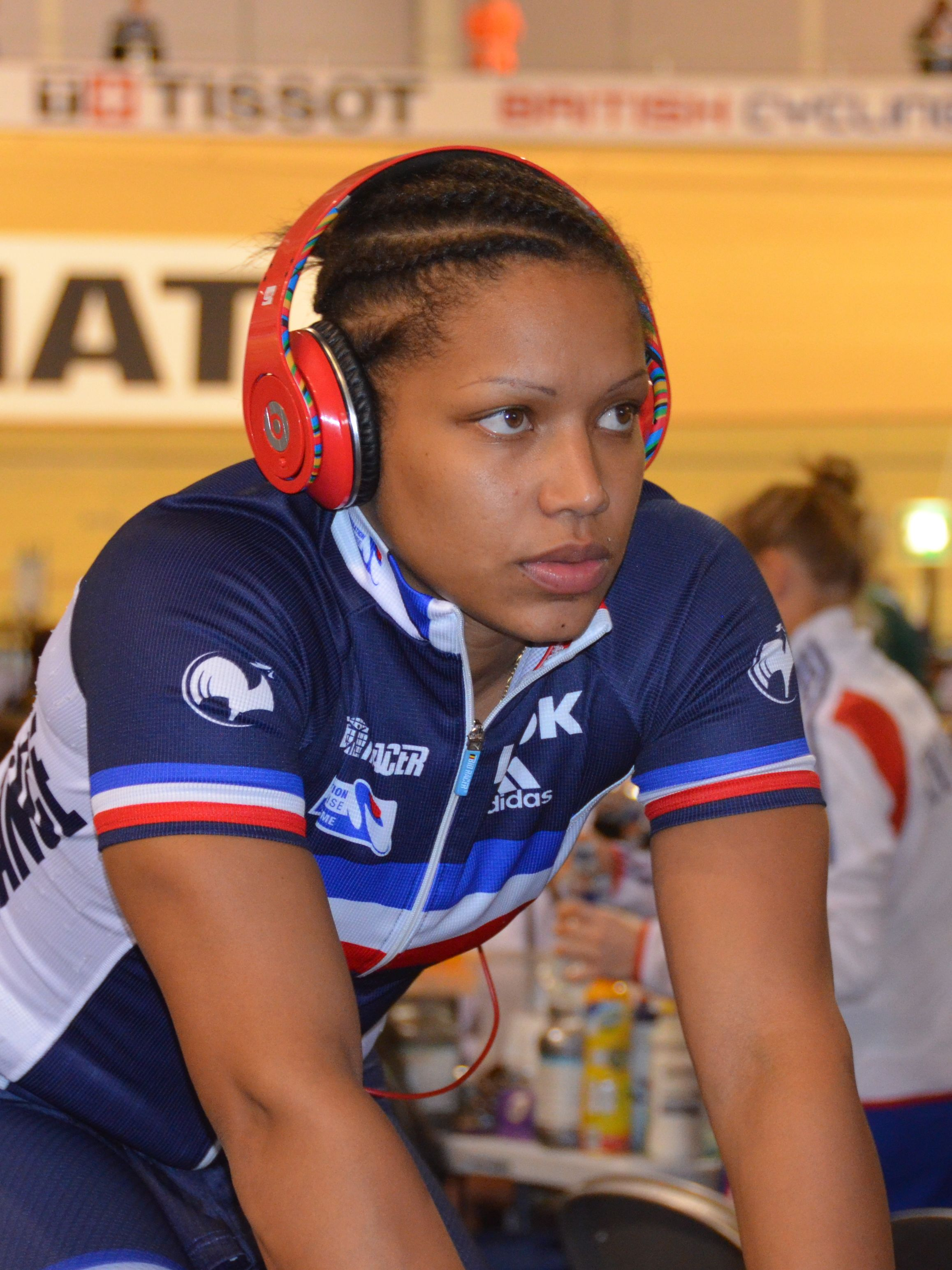
- Montauban in 2012

Personal information
- Born: 26 August 1991 (age 35) Les Abymes, Guadeloupe, France

Cycling career
- Sport: Cycling
- Discipline: Track cycling

Olivia Montauban (born 26 August 1991) is a track cyclist from France. She represented her nation at the 2015 UCI Track Cycling World Championships.

== Career results ==
2011
2nd Sprint, UEC European U23 Track Championships
2012
UEC European U23 Track Championships

2nd Sprint
3rd 500m Time Trial

2013
2nd Keirin, UEC European U23 Track Championships
3rd Keirin, Revolution – Round 2, Glasgow
2014
International Belgian Open

1st Keirin
1st Sprint

Fenioux Trophy Piste

2nd Sprint
3rd 500m Time Trial

3rd Sprint, Fenioux Piste International
2015
2nd Keirin, Open des Nations sur Piste de Roubaix
