= Elis Ligtlee =

Dutch cyclist (born 1994)

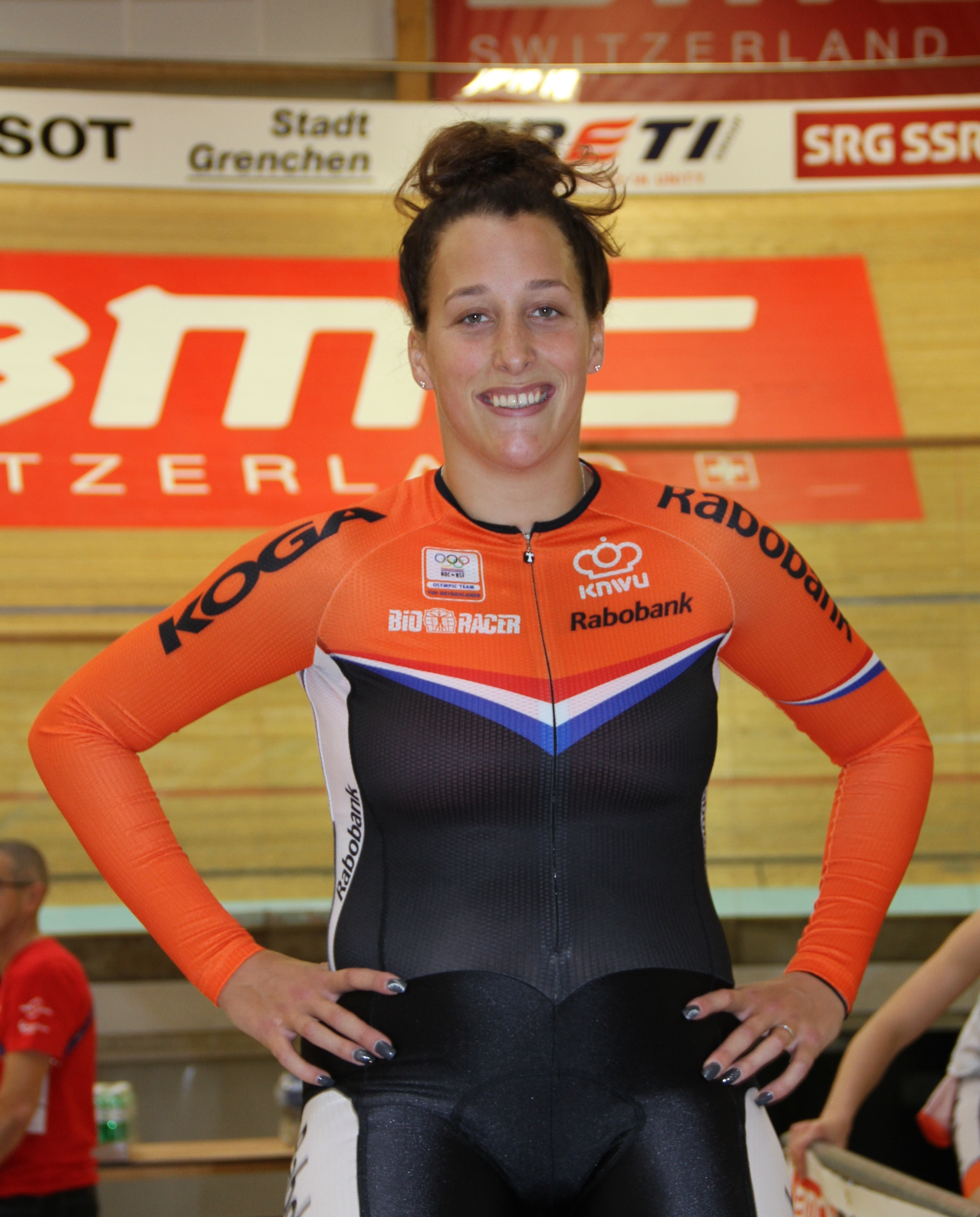
- Ligtlee in 2015

Personal information
- Born: 28 June 1994 (age 32) Deventer, the Netherlands
- Height: 1.85 m (6 ft 1 in)

Cycling career
- Sport: Cycling
- Discipline: Track cycling
- Rider type: Sprinter
Medal record
Representing the Netherlands
Olympic Games
Gold medal – first place	2016 Rio de Janeiro	Keirin
World Championships
Silver medal – second place	2015 Yvelines	Sprint
Bronze medal – third place	2016 London	500m time trial
Bronze medal – third place	2018 Apeldoorn	500 m time trial
European Championships
Gold medal – first place	2013 Apeldoorn	Keirin
Gold medal – first place	2015 Grenchen	Sprint
Gold medal – first place	2015 Grenchen	Keirin
Silver medal – second place	2013 Apeldoorn	Sprint
Silver medal – second place	2014 Guadeloupe	Time Trial
Silver medal – second place	2015 Grenchen	Time Trial
Bronze medal – third place	2014 Guadeloupe	Team Sprint
Bronze medal – third place	2015 Grenchen	Team Sprint

Elis Ligtlee (born 28 June 1994) is a Dutch former track cyclist. She represented her nation at the 2014 and 2015 UCI Track Cycling World Championships. She won the gold medal in the keirin race at the 2016 Summer Olympics. Following her Olympic victory, Ligtlee was officially inducted to the Knight of the Order of Orange-Nassau.

== Major results ==
2013
Revolution

1st Sprint – Round 2, Glasgow
2nd Keirin – Round 2, Glasgow

UEC European U23 Track Championships

1st Team Sprint (with Shanne Braspennincx)
1st 500m Time Trial
3rd Sprint

Grand Prix Sprint Apeldoorn

2nd Sprint
3rd Keirin

2014
1st Sprint, Revolution – Round 3, Manchester
1st Sprint, Champions of Sprint
Festival of Speed

1st Sprint
2nd Keirin

Open des Nations sur Piste de Roubaix

1st Keirin
2nd Sprint
2nd Team Sprint (with Shanne Braspennincx)

UEC European U23 Track Championships

1st Keirin
2nd Sprint
2nd Team Sprint (with Yesna Rijkhoff)
3rd 500m Time Trial

UEC European Track Championships

2nd 500m Time Trial
3rd Team Sprint (with Shanne Braspennincx)

2nd Sprint, US Sprint GP
2nd Team Sprint, Cottbuser Nächte (with Shanne Braspennincx)
2nd Sprint, Track-Cycling Challenge Grenchen
Sprintermeeting

2nd Sprint
3rd Keirin

2015
UEC European Track Championships

1st Keirin
1st Sprint
2nd 500m Time Trial
3rd Team Sprint (with Laurine van Riessen)

1st Sprint, US Sprint GP
1st Sprint, Festival of Speed
2nd Sprint, Open des Nations sur Piste de Roubaix
UEC European U23 Track Championships

2nd Sprint
2nd 500m Time Trial
3rd Keirin
3rd Team Sprint (with Kyra Lamberink)

3rd Keirin, Fastest Man on Wheels

2016
1st Keirin, Olympic Games
UEC European U23 Track Championships

1st Keirin
1st Sprint
1st Team Sprint (with Kyra Lamberink)
1st 500m Time Trial

1st Keirin, Oberhausen
1st Sprint, Öschelbronn
1st Sprint, Dudenhofen
3rd Sprint, UCI World Track Cycling Championships
2017
2nd Sprint, Belgian International Track Meeting
3rd Sprint, Internationaal Baan Sprint Keirin Toernooi
3rd Keirin, Troféu Internacional de Anadia
