= Olena Tsyos =

Ukrainian cyclist

Medal record

Women's track cycling

Representing Ukraine

European Track Championships
Silver medal – second place	2011 Apeldoorn	Team Sprint

Olena Tsyos (Ukrainian: Олена Цьось; born 9 May 1990, Lutsk) is a Ukrainian track cyclist. At the 2012 Summer Olympics, she competed in the Women's team sprint for the national team, which finished in fourth place.

== Major results ==
2013
1st Sprint, Grand Prix of Russian Helicopters
1st 500m Time Trial, Copa Internacional de Pista
2014
Grand Prix Galichyna

1st Sprint
1st Team Sprint (with Olena Starikova)
1st 500m Time Trial
2nd Keirin

3rd Keirin, Panevezys
Grand Prix Minsk

3rd Keirin
3rd Sprint
