= Virginie Cueff =

French cyclist

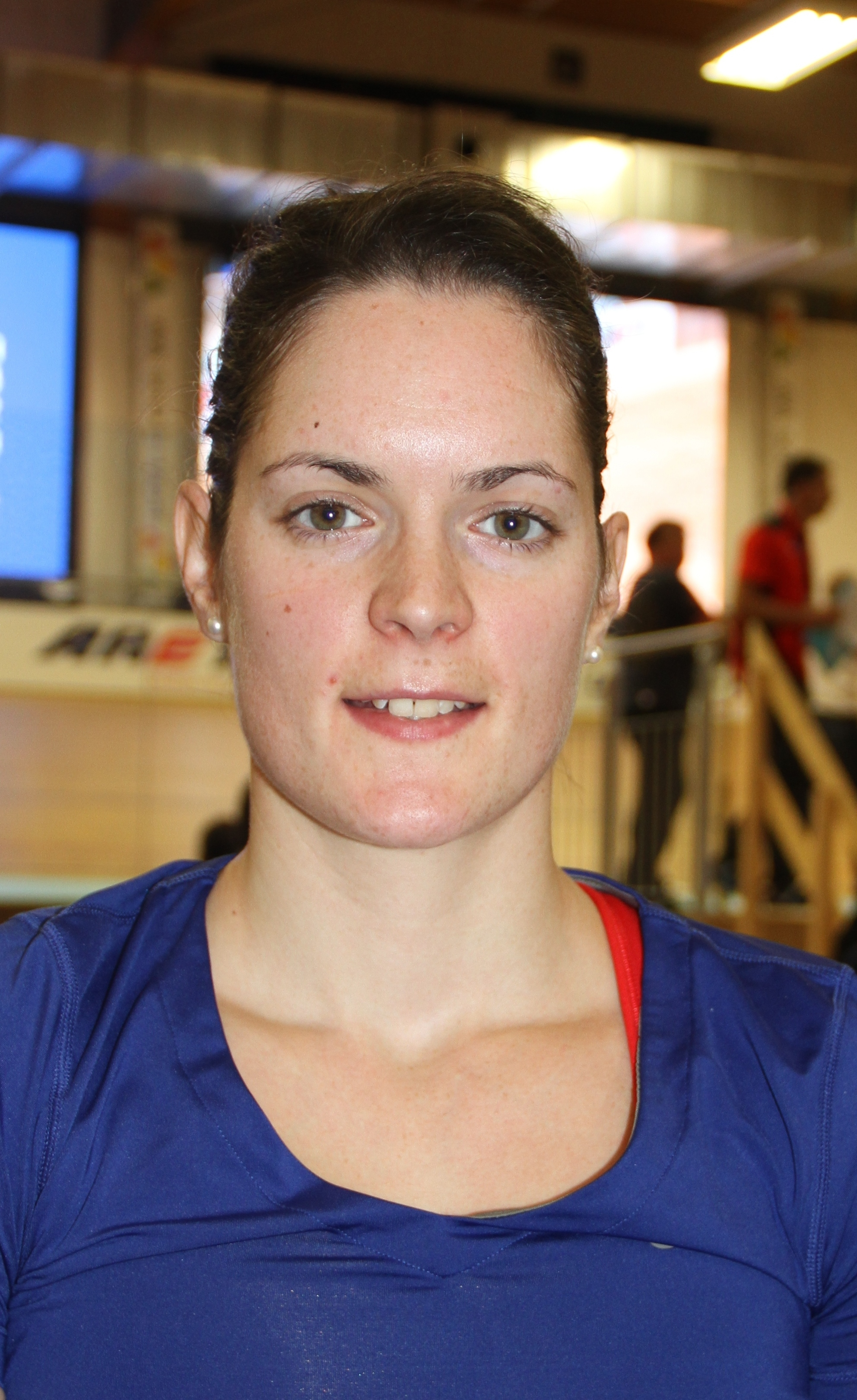
- Virginie Cueff (2015)

Personal information
- Full name: Virginie Cueff
- Born: 18 June 1988 (age 38) Gouesnou, France
- Height: 170 cm (5 ft 7 in)
- Weight: 61 kg (134 lb)

Cycling career
- Sport: Cycling
- Discipline: Track
- Role: Rider
- Rider type: Sprinter
Medal record
Universiade
Bronze medal – third place	2011 Shenzhen	Sprint
European Track Championships
Bronze medal – third place	2013 Apeldoorn	Keirin

Virginie Cueff (born 18 June 1988, in Gouesnou) is a French professional racing cyclist.

== Palmarès ==
2006
2nd Sprint, European Track Championships, Juniors, Athens
3rd 500 m, European Track Championships, Juniors, Athens
2nd European Championship, Track, Scratch, Juniors (F), Athens
3rd Sydney, Team Sprint (AUS)
3rd Moscou, Team Sprint (RUS)
3rd Sydney, Team Sprint (F) (AUS)

2007
3rd 500 m, European Track Championships, U23, Cottbus (GER)

2nd Los Angeles, Team Sprint (F) (USA)

2009
1st Team Sprint, UEC European U23 Track Championships

2010
UEC European U23 Track Championships

1st Team Sprint
2nd Keirin
2nd Sprint
3rd 500m Time Trail

2013
3rd Keirin, European Track Championships, Apeldoorn (NED)

2014
South East Asian GP Track (1)

1st Keirin
1st Sprint

South East Asian GP Track (3)

1st Sprint
2nd Keirin

Fenioux Piste International

1st Keirin
1st Team sprint (with Sandie Clair)

2nd Sprint, South East Asian GP Track (2)
Grand Prix de Vitesse de Saint-Denis

2nd Keirin
2nd Sprint

2nd Team Sprint, GP von Deutschland im Sprint (with Sandie Clair)
3rd Sprint, Fenioux Trophy Piste
3rd Team Sprint, Open des Nations sur Piste de Roubaix (with Sandie Clair)

2015
Grand Prix de Vitesse de Saint-Denis

1st Sprint
3rd Keirin

Prova Internacional de Anadia

1st Keirin
1st Sprint

6 giorni delle rose - Fiorenzuola

2nd Sprint
3rd Keirin

2nd Keirin, UEC European Track Championships
3rd Sprint, Trofeu CAR Anadia Portugal
3rd Sprint, Open des Nations sur Piste de Roubaix

2016
1st Sprint, Fenioux Piste International
