= Tania Calvo =

Spanish cyclist (born 1992)

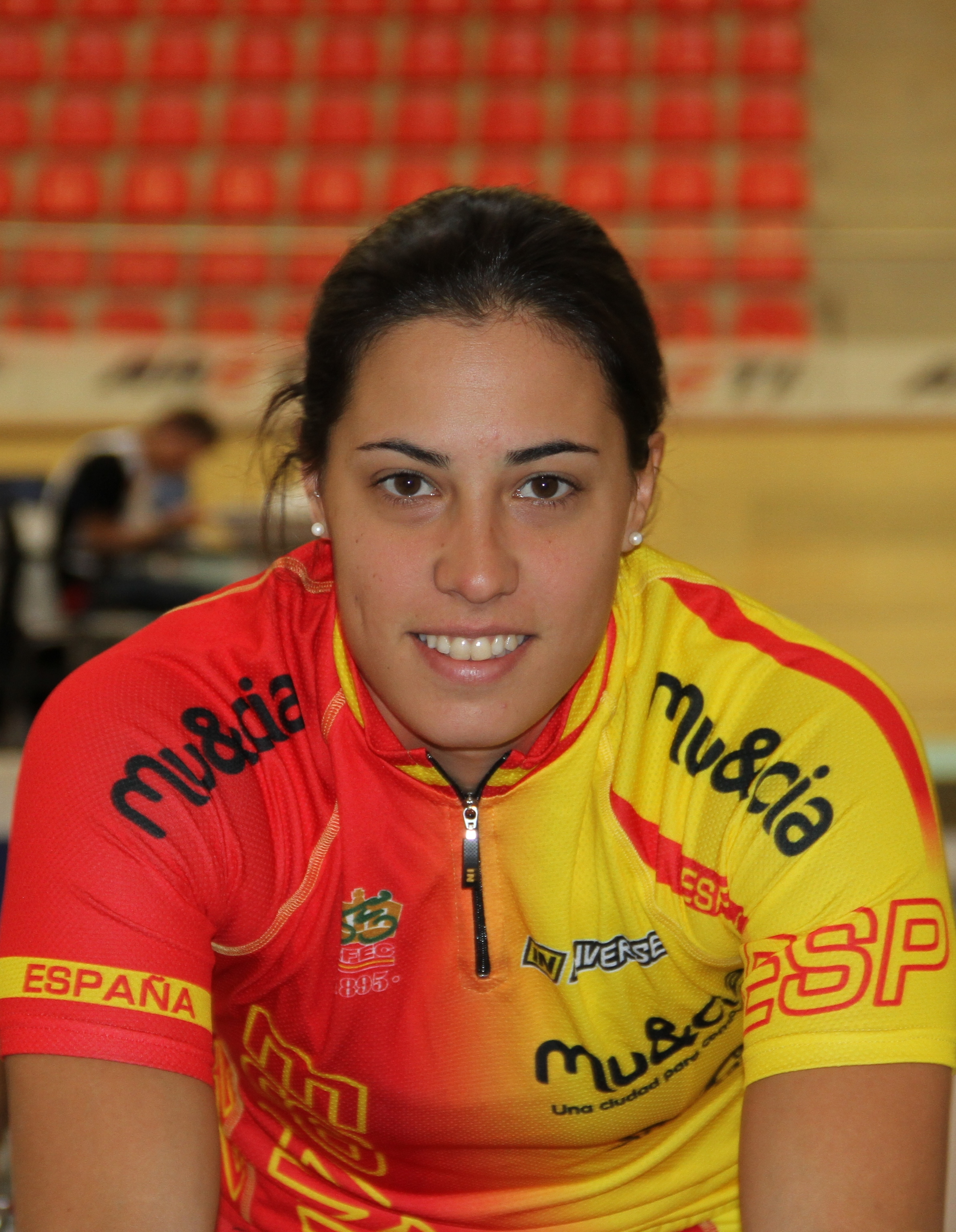
- Calvo at the 2015 UEC European Track Championships

Personal information
- Full name: Tania Calvo Barbero
- Born: 26 June 1992 (age 34) Vitoria, Spain

Cycling career
- Sport: Cycling
- Current team: Laboral Kutxa–Fundación Euskadi
- Disciplines: Track; Road
- Role: Rider

Amateur team
- 2017: Gipuzkoa–Ogi Berri

Professional team
- 2021–: Laboral Kutxa–Fundación Euskadi
Medal record
Women's track cycling
Representing Spain
European Championships
Silver medal – second place	2014 Guadeloupe	Sprint
Silver medal – second place	2016 Yvelines	Team sprint
Bronze medal – third place	2016 Yvelines	Sprint

Tania Calvo Barbero (born 26 June 1992) is a Spanish professional racing cyclist, who currently rides for UCI Women's Continental Team Laboral Kutxa–Fundación Euskadi. She rode at the 2015 UCI Track Cycling World Championships.

== Major results ==
2013
Copa Internacional de Pista

1st Sprint
1st Team Sprint (with Helena Casas)

UEC European U23 Track Championships

2nd Sprint
3rd 500m Time Trial

2014
1st Sprint, Öschelbronn
2nd Sprint, UEC European Track Championships
2nd Keirin, Singen
2nd Sprint, Oberhausen
3rd Sprint, UEC European U23 Track Championships
2015
1st Sprint, 6 giorni delle rose - Fiorenzuola
1st Keirin, Irish International Track GP
Trofeu Ciutat de Barcelona

1st Keirin
1st Sprint

Grand Prix of Poland

2nd Keirin
2nd Sprint

3rd Sprint, Revolution – Round 1, Derby
2016
Trofeu Ciutat de Barcelona

1st Keirin
1st Sprint

Trofeu CAR Anadia Portugal

1st Sprint
1st 500m Tim Trial

6 giorni delle rose - Fiorenzuola

2nd Sprint
3rd Keirin

2017
TROFEU CIUTAT DE BARCELONA-Memorial Miquel Poblet

3rd Keirin
3rd Sprint
