= Netherlands at the UEC European Track Championships =

Netherlands at the European Track Championships is an overview of the Dutch results at the European Track Championships. Since 2001 there have been "European Track Championships for under-23 and junior" riders and since 2010 "European Track Championships for elite" riders. Note that the under-23 and junior championships before 2010 also included omnium elite events.

== European Track Championships (elite) 2010-current ==
Netherlands at the European Track Championships (elite)
- IOC code: NED

2010 –
- Medals Ranked 8thth: Gold 2 Silver 6 Bronze 5 Total 13

European Track Championships (elite) appearances
- 2010; 2011; 2012; 2013; 2014

=== Medalists ===
2008 event

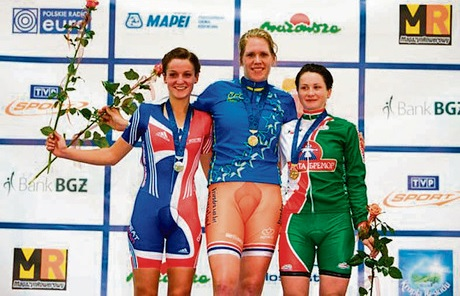
Ellen van Dijk won 2 gold medals and 2 silver medals. Pictured: podium women's under-23 points race

Medal	Name	Event	Date
Gold	Ellen van Dijk	U23 women's points race	6 September
Gold	Ellen van Dijk	U23 women's scratch	7 September
Silver	Ellen van Dijk	Women's omnium	3 September
Silver	Ellen van Dijk	U23 women's individual pursuit	6 September
Silver	Pim Ligthart	U23 men's scratch	6 September
Bronze	Amy Pieters	Junior women's points race	6 September

This is a list of medals won at the UEC European Track Championships for elite riders from 2010 to current.

Medal	Championship	Name	Event
Silver	(Poland) 2010 Pruszków	Tim Veldt	Men's omnium
Bronze	(Poland) 2010 Pruszków	Levi Heimans; Arno van der Zwet; Tim Veldt; Sipke Zijlstra	Men's team pursuit
Bronze	(Netherlands) 2011 Apeldoorn	Kirsten Wild	Women's omnium
Gold	(Netherlands) 2013 Apeldoorn	Elis Ligtlee	Women's keirin
Gold	(Netherlands) 2013 Apeldoorn	Kirsten Wild	Women's points race
Silver	(Netherlands) 2013 Apeldoorn	Elis Ligtlee	Women's sprint
Silver	(Netherlands) 2013 Apeldoorn	Tim Veldt	Men's omnium
Silver	(Netherlands) 2013 Apeldoorn	Kirsten Wild	Men's omnium
Bronze	(Netherlands) 2013 Apeldoorn	Tim Veldt; Dion Beukeboom; Roy Eefting; Jenning Huizenga	Men's team pursuit
Silver	(France) 2014 Guadeloupe	Matthijs Büchli	Men's keirin
Silver	(France) 2014 Guadeloupe	Elis Ligtlee	Women's 500 m time trial
Bronze	(France) 2014 Guadeloupe	Elis Ligtlee; Shanne Braspennincx	Women's team sprint
Bronze	(France) 2014 Guadeloupe	Shanne Braspennincx	Women's keirin
Gold	(Switzerland) 2015 Grenchen	Nils van 't Hoenderdaal; Jeffrey Hoogland; Hugo Haak	Men's team sprint
Gold	(Switzerland) 2015 Grenchen	Jeffrey Hoogland	Men's sprint
Gold	(Switzerland) 2015 Grenchen	Elis Ligtlee	Women's sprint
Gold	(Switzerland) 2015 Grenchen	Jeffrey Hoogland	Men's 1 km time trial
Gold	(Switzerland) 2015 Grenchen	Elis Ligtlee	Women's keirin
Silver	(Switzerland) 2015 Grenchen	Elis Ligtlee	Women's 500 m time trial
Silver	(Switzerland) 2015 Grenchen	Kirsten Wild	Women's scratch
Bronze	(Switzerland) 2015 Grenchen	Laurine van Riessen; Elis Ligtlee	Women's team sprint
Bronze	(Switzerland) 2015 Grenchen	Dion Beukeboom	Men's individual sprint

=== Medals by year ===
Championship	Gold	Silver	Bronze	Total	Rank
(Poland) 2010 Pruszków	0	1	1	2	9
(Netherlands) 2011 Apeldoorn	0	0	1	1	13
(Lithuania) 2012 Panevėžys	0	0	0	0	-
(Netherlands) 2013 Apeldoorn	2	3	1	6	4
(France) 2014 Guadeloupe	0	2	2	4	9
(Switzerland) 2015 Grenchen	5	2	2	9	2
Total	7	8	7	19	

== European Track Championships (under-23 & junior) 2001-current ==
Netherlands at the European Track Championships (under 23 & junior)
- IOC code: NED

2001 –
- Medals: Gold 23 Silver 22 Bronze 33 Total 78

European Track Championships (under 23 & junior) appearances
- 2001; 2002; 2003; 2004; 2005; 2006; 2007; 2008; 2009; 2010; 2011; 2012; 2013

Below is an overview of the Dutch results at the European Track Championships for under-23 and junior riders. Note that these championships also had a few elite events.

=== Medalists ===
==== Elite ====
This is a list of medals won at the European Track Championships for elite riders from 2001 to 2009 current.

Medal	Championship	Name	Event
Silver	(Italy) 2005 Fiorenzuola d'Arda	Teun Mulder	Men's sprint omnium
Silver	(Poland) 2008 Pruszków	Ellen van Dijk	Women's omnium

==== Under-23 medalists ====
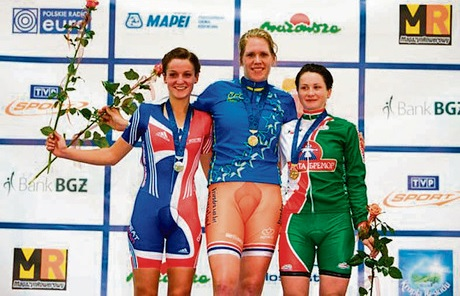
Ellen van Dijk won 2 gold medals and 2 silver medals in 2008. Pictured: podium women's under-23 points race

Medal	Championship	Name	Under-23 event
Bronze	(Czech Republic) 2001 Brno	Teun Mulder	Men's 1 km time trial
Bronze	(Czech Republic) 2001 Brno	Teun Mulder	Men's keirin
Gold	(Germany) 2002 Büttgen	Theo Bos	Men's keirin
Gold	(Germany) 2002 Büttgen	Jos Pronk	Men's scratch
Gold	(Germany) 2002 Büttgen	Vera Koedooder	Women's points race
Silver	(Germany) 2002 Büttgen	Theo Bos	Men's 1 km time trial
Silver	(Germany) 2002 Büttgen	Theo Bos	Men's sprint
Silver	(Germany) 2002 Büttgen	Vera Koedooder	Women's individual pursuit
Bronze	(Germany) 2002 Büttgen	Teun Mulder	Men's 1 km time trial
Bronze	(Germany) 2002 Büttgen	Teun Mulder	Men's sprint
Bronze	(Germany) 2002 Büttgen	Yvonne Hijgenaar	Women's 500 m time trial
Bronze	(Germany) 2002 Büttgen	Vera Koedooder	Women's scratch
Gold	(Russia) 2003 Moscow	Theo Bos	Men's 1 km time trial
Gold	(Russia) 2003 Moscow	Theo Bos	Men's sprint
Gold	(Russia) 2003 Moscow	Teun Mulder	Men's keirin
Silver	(Russia) 2003 Moscow	Theo Bos	Men's keirin
Silver	(Russia) 2003 Moscow	Vera Koedooder	Women's individual pursuit
Silver	(Spain) 2004 Valence	Wim Stroetinga; Gert-Jan Jonkman; Levi Heimans; Jos Pronk	Men's team pursuit
Bronze	(Spain) 2004 Valence	Levi Heimans	Men's individual pursuit
Bronze	(Spain) 2004 Valence	Vera Koedooder	Women's individual pursuit
Silver	(Italy) 2005 Fiorenzuola d'Arda	Marlijn Binnendijk	Women's individual pursuit
Bronze	(Italy) 2005 Fiorenzuola d'Arda	Wim Stroetinga	Men's scratch
Bronze	(Italy) 2005 Fiorenzuola d'Arda	Levi Heimans	Men's individual pursuit
Bronze	(Italy) 2005 Fiorenzuola d'Arda	Tim Veldt	Men's 1 km time trial
Bronze	(Italy) 2005 Fiorenzuola d'Arda	Nina Köhn	Women's points race
Gold	(Greece) 2006 Athens	Tim Veldt	Men's 1 km time trial
Gold	(Greece) 2006 Athens	Wim Stroetinga	Men's scratch
Gold	(Greece) 2006 Athens	Marlijn Binnendijk	Women's points race
Silver	(Greece) 2006 Athens	Niki Terpstra	Men's points race
Gold	(Germany) 2007 Cottbus	Marlijn Binnendijk	Women's points race
Silver	(Germany) 2007 Cottbus	Pim Ligthart	Men's points race
Silver	(Germany) 2007 Cottbus	Wim Stroetinga; Pim Ligthart	Men's Madison
Gold	(Poland) 2008 Pruszków	Ellen van Dijk	Women's points race
Gold	(Poland) 2008 Pruszków	Ellen van Dijk	Women's scratch
Silver	(Poland) 2008 Pruszków	Ellen van Dijk	Women's individual pursuit
Silver	(Poland) 2008 Pruszków	Pim Ligthart	Men's scratch
Silver	(Portugal) 2011 Anadia	Nick Stöpler	Men's points race
Silver	(Portugal) 2011 Anadia	Roy Eefting	Men's omnium
Bronze	(Portugal) 2011 Anadia	Yoeri Havik; Nick Stöpler	Men's Madison
Bronze	(Portugal) 2011 Anadia	Laura van der Kamp	Women's omnium
Gold	(Portugal) 2012 Anadia	Amy Pieters	Women's individual pursuit
Silver	(Portugal) 2012 Anadia	Hugo Haak	Men's 1 km time trial
Bronze	(Portugal) 2012 Anadia	Barry Markus	Men's scratch
Bronze	(Portugal) 2012 Anadia	Yesna Rijkhoff; Shanne Braspennincx	Women's team sprint
Gold	(Portugal) 2013 Anadia	Elis Ligtlee	Women's 500 m time trial
Gold	(Portugal) 2013 Anadia	Shanne Braspennincx	Women's keirin
Gold	(Portugal) 2013 Anadia	Elis Ligtlee; Shanne Braspennincx	Women's team sprint
Bronze	(Portugal) 2013 Anadia	Hugo Haak	Men's sprint
Bronze	(Portugal) 2013 Anadia	Matthijs Büchli; Jeffrey Hoogland; Hugo Haak	Men's team sprint
Bronze	(Portugal) 2013 Anadia	Yesna Rijkhoff	Women's keirin
Bronze	(Portugal) 2013 Anadia	Elis Ligtlee	Women's sprint

==== Junior medalists ====
Medal	Championship	Name	Junior event
Silver	(Germany) 2002 Büttgen	Suzanne de Goede	Girls individual pursuit
Bronze	(Germany) 2002 Büttgen	Gideon de Jong	Boys points race
Gold	(Russia) 2003 Moscow	Wim Stroetinga	Boys points race
Gold	(Russia) 2003 Moscow	Marlijn Binnendijk	Girls individual pursuit
Silver	(Russia) 2003 Moscow	Levi Heimans	Boys individual pursuit
Silver	(Russia) 2003 Moscow	Wim Stroetinga; Niels Pieters; Levi Heimans; Kevin Sluimer	Boys team pursuit
Gold	(Spain) 2004 Valence	Liesbeth Bakker	Girls individual pursuit
Bronze	(Spain) 2004 Valence	Liesbeth Bakker	Girls points race
Bronze	(Spain) 2004 Valence	Joukje Braam	Girls keirin
Gold	(Greece) 2006 Athens	Elise van Hage	Girls points race
Gold	(Greece) 2006 Athens	Elise van Hage	Girls scratch
Silver	(Greece) 2006 Athens	Elise van Hage	Girls individual pursuit
Bronze	(Greece) 2006 Athens	Gerrit Peetoom	Boys scratch
Gold	(Germany) 2007 Cottbus	Michael Vingerling	Boys scratch
Bronze	(Germany) 2007 Cottbus	Roy Pieters	Boys scratch
Bronze	(Poland) 2008 Pruszków	Amy Pieters	Girls points race
Bronze	(Portugal) 2011 Anadia	Elis Ligtlee	Girls 500 m time trial
Bronze	(Portugal) 2011 Anadia	Kelly Markus	Girls points race
Bronze	(Portugal) 2011 Anadia	Kelly Markus	Girls scratch
Gold	(Portugal) 2012 Anadia	Elis Ligtlee	Girls sprint
Silver	(Portugal) 2012 Anadia	Elis Ligtlee	Girls 500 m time trial
Bronze	(Portugal) 2012 Anadia	Elis Ligtlee	Girls keirin
Bronze	(Portugal) 2012 Anadia	Tamar Vedder; Elis Ligtlee	Girls team sprint
Bronze	(Portugal) 2013 Anadia	Kyra Lamberink	Girls keirin
Bronze	(Portugal) 2013 Anadia	Bianca Lust	Girls points race

=== Most successful Dutch competitors ===
updated after the 2013 European Track Championships (under-23 & junior)

Name	Medals	Championships
Elis Ligtlee	3 gold, 1 silver, 4 bronze	(gold) 2012 – Girls sprint (gold) 2013 – Women's under-23 team sprint (gold) 2013 – Women's under-23 500 m time trial (silver) 2012 – Girls 500 m time trial (bronze) 2013 – Women's under-23 sprint (bronze) 2011 – Girls 500 m time trial (bronze) 2012 – Girls team sprint (bronze) 2012 – Girls team sprint
Theo Bos	3 gold, 1 silver, 0 bronze	(gold) 2002 – Men's under-23 keirin (gold) 2003 – Men's under-23 1 km time trial (gold) 2003 – Men's under-23 sprint (silver) 2003 – Men's under-23 keirin
Marlijn Binnendijk	3 gold, 1 silver, 0 bronze	(gold) 2003 – Girls individual pursuit (gold) 2006 – Women's under-23 points race (gold) 2007 – Women's under-23 points race (silver) 2005 – Women's under-23 individual pursuit
Wim Stroetinga	2 gold, 3 silver, 0 bronze	(gold) 2003 – Boys points race (gold) 2006 – Men's under-23 scratch (silver) 2003 – Men's under-23 team pursuit (silver) 2007 – Men's under-23 madison (silver) 2004 – Men's under-23 team pursuit
Ellen van Dijk	2 gold, 2 silver, 0 bronze	(gold) 2008 – Women's under-23 points race (gold) 2008 – Women's under-23 scratch (silver) 2008 – Women's madison (silver) 2008 – Women's under-23 individual pursuit
Elise van Hage	2 gold, 1 silver, 0 bronze	(gold) 2006 – Girls points race (gold) 2006 – Girls scratch (silver) 2006 – Girls individual pursuit
Shanne Braspennincx	2 gold, 0 silver, 1 bronze	(gold) 2013 – Women's under-23 keirin (gold) 2013 – Women's under-23 team sprint (bronze) 2012 – Women's under-23 team sprint

=== Medals by year ===
Championship	Gold	Silver	Bronze	Total	Rank
(Czech Republic) 2001 Brno	0	0	2	2	—N/a
(Germany) 2002 Büttgen	3	4	5	12	6
(Russia) 2003 Moscow	5	4	0	9	2
(Spain) 2004 Valence	1	1	4	6	9
(Italy) 2005 Fiorenzuola d'Arda	0	2	4	6	14
(Greece) 2006 Athens	5	2	1	8	2
(Germany) 2007 Cottbus	2	2	1	5	5
(Poland) 2008 Pruszków	2	3	1	6	4
(Portugal) 2011 Anadia	0	2	5	7	10
(Portugal) 2012 Anadia	2	2	4	8	8
(Portugal) 2013 Anadia	3	0	6	9	8
Total	23	22	33	78	

== See also ==
- Netherlands at the UCI Track Cycling World Championships
- Netherlands at the UCI Track Cycling World Cup Classics
- Netherlands at the European Road Championships
- Netherlands at the UCI Road World Championships
