= UEC European Track Championships – Women's omnium =

UEC European Champion jersey

The Women's omnium at the European Track Championships was first competed in 1997.

The Omnium event, consists of a combination of different disciplines, sharing similarities with other multi-event sports such as Modern Pentathlon, heptathlon and decathlon. The make up of the event has fluctuated since its introduction, as the event has been tweaked. In its most modern version, the event operates as an extended points race for endurance riders over one day – points are won in the first three disciplines (a scratch, tempo and elimination race) and these points are then brought forward to the final event, the points race. Timed elements that formally were part of the race, such as the flying lap, kilo and individual pursuit, have gradually been removed so that all four elements are now mass start.

== Medalists ==
The women's omnium has been contested since before the advent of the full European Track championships, but can be broadly divided between a pre-Olympic event, and the Olympic event. For two years, a separate 'Omnium sprint' event was also held.

The most successful cyclist in the event before its Olympic inclusion was Olga Slyusareva who took six titles in seven years for Russia between 1998 and 2005. Following its Olympic inclusion, double-Olympic champion Laura Kenny holds the record for four titles and two silver medals, with Katie Archibald her closest challenger with four titles and a silver. The Great Britain pairs dominance' is notable, as each nation can, as is common in such events, only enter one athlete – as such, Kenny and Archibald have never faced each other at Olympic, world or European level, while the event is not held at the Commonwealth Games. Only Dutch racer Kirsten Wild with two titles, three silvers and a bronze has more than one title win outside these three.

=== Omnium endurance ===
The discipline exists of a points race, an individual pursuit, a scratch race and an elimination race.

| Championships | Gold | Silver | Bronze |
|---|---|---|---|
| 1997 | Antonella Bellutti (ITA) | Ingrid Haringa (NED) | Sally Boyden (GBR) |
| 1998 | Olga Slyusareva (RUS) | Leontien Zijlaard-van Moorsel (NED) | Svetlana Samokhvalova (RUS) |
| 1999 | Olga Slyusareva (RUS) | Antonella Bellutti (ITA) | Debby Mansveld (NED) |
| 2001 | Olga Slyusareva (RUS) | Svetlana Ivakhovenkova (RUS) | Vera Carrara (ITA) |
| 2002 | Olga Slyusareva (RUS) | Svetlana Ivakhonenkova (RUS) | Natalia Karimova (RUS) |
| 2003 | Olga Slyusareva (RUS) | Elena Tchalykh (RUS) | Iryna Yanovych (UKR) |
| 2004 | Lyudmyla Vypyraylo (UKR) | Apollinaria Bakova (RUS) | Eleonora Soldo (ITA) |
| 2005 | Olga Slyusareva (RUS) | Lada Kozlíková (CZE) | Gema Pascual (ESP) |
| 2006 | Lada Kozlíková (CZE) | Yulia Aroustamova (RUS) | Carolina Lüthi (SUI) |
| 2007 | Vera Carrara (ITA) | Gema Pascual (ESP) | Elke Gebhardt (GER) |
| 2008 | Elena Tchalykh (RUS) | Ellen van Dijk (NED) | Anastasia Tchulkova (RUS) |
| 2009 | Evgenia Romanyuta (RUS) | Jolien D'Hoore (BEL) | Monia Baccaille (ITA) |

=== Omnium sprint ===
The discipline exists of a flying lap, a keirin, an elimination race and a sprint.

| Championships | Gold | Silver | Bronze |
|---|---|---|---|
| 2008 | Yvonne Hijgenaar (NED) | Elise Van Hage (NED) | Helena Casas (ESP) |
| 2009 | Simona Krupeckaitė (LTU) | Olga Streltsova (RUS) | Viktoria Baranova (RUS) |

=== Omnium Olympic ===
The individual disciplines of the event have changed over time. Initially consisting of a flying lap, a points race, an elimination race, an individual pursuit, a scratch race and a time trial, since 2016 the discipline consists of a scratch race, a tempo race, an elimination race, leading to a final deciding points race.

| Championships | Gold | Silver | Bronze |
|---|---|---|---|
| 2010 Pruszków | Leire Olaberria; Spain | Tatsiana Sharakova; Belarus | Małgorzata Wojtyra; Poland |
| 2011 Apeldoorn | Laura Trott; Great Britain | Tatsiana Sharakova; Belarus | Kirsten Wild; Netherlands |
| 2012 Panevėžys | Aušrinė Trebaitė; Lithuania | Katarzyna Pawłowska; Poland | Tamara Balabolina; Russia |
| 2013 Apeldoorn | Laura Trott; Great Britain | Kirsten Wild; Netherlands | Jolien D'Hoore; Belgium |
| 2014 Baie-Mahault | Laura Trott; Great Britain | Jolien D'Hoore; Belgium | Anna Knauer; Germany |
| 2015 Grenchen | Laura Trott; Great Britain | Amalie Dideriksen; Denmark | Aušrinė Trebaitė; Lithuania |
| 2016 Saint-Quentin-en-Yvelines | Katie Archibald; Great Britain | Kirsten Wild; Netherlands | Lotte Kopecky; Belgium |
| 2017 Berlin | Katie Archibald; Great Britain | Kirsten Wild; Netherlands | Elisa Balsamo; Italy |
| 2018 Glasgow | Kirsten Wild; Netherlands | Katie Archibald; Great Britain | Letizia Paternoster; Italy |
| 2019 Apeldoorn | Kirsten Wild; Netherlands | Laura Kenny; Great Britain | Tatsiana Sharakova; Belarus |
| 2020 Plovdiv | Elisa Balsamo; Italy | Laura Kenny; Great Britain | Maria Novolodskaya; Russia |
| 2021 Grenchen | Katie Archibald; Great Britain | Victoire Berteau; France | Rachele Barbieri; Italy |
| 2022 Munich | Rachele Barbieri; Italy | Clara Copponi; France | Daria Pikulik; Poland |
| 2023 Grenchen | Katie Archibald; Great Britain | Daria Pikulik; Poland | Lotte Kopecky; Belgium |
| 2024 Apeldoorn | Anita Stenberg; Norway | Neah Evans; Great Britain | Valentine Fortin; France |
| 2025 | Lorena Wiebes; Netherlands | Maddie Leech; Great Britain | Amalie Dideriksen; Denmark |
| 2026 Konya | Anna Morris; Great Britain | Anita Stenberg; Norway | Shari Bossuyt; Belgium |
