= UEC European Track Championships – Men's omnium =

UEC European Champion jersey

The Men's omnium at the European Track Championships was first competed in 2010. Prior to 2010, there were two elite omniums held annually: an endurance omnium and a sprint omnium.

The Omnium has varied over time in the number and type of events included. As of 2026, the event is essentially an endurance points race held over one day, with four events; a scratch race, a tempo race and an elimination race, each with a maximum of 40 points, with a final points race proper with sprint and lap points available to determine the medals.

== Medalists ==
Championships	Gold	Silver	Bronze
2010 Pruszków	Roger Kluge (GER)	Tim Veldt (NED)	Rafał Ratajczyk (POL)
2011 Apeldoorn	Ed Clancy (GBR)	Bryan Coquard (FRA)	Elia Viviani (ITA)
2012 Panevėžys	Lucas Liss (GER)	Artur Ershov (RUS)	Gediminas Bagdonas (LTU)
2013 Apeldoorn	Viktor Manakov (RUS)	Tim Veldt (NED)	Martyn Irvine (IRL)
2014 Guadeloupe	Elia Viviani (ITA)	Jon Dibben (GBR)	Unai Elorriaga (SPA)
2015 Grenchen	Elia Viviani (ITA)	Lasse Norman Hansen (DEN)	Jon Dibben (GBR)
2016 Saint-Quentin-en-Yvelines	Albert Torres (SPA)	Gael Suter (SUI)	Benjamin Thomas (FRA)
2017 Berlin	Albert Torres (SPA)	Julius Johansen (DEN)	Benjamin Thomas (FRA)
2018 Glasgow	Ethan Hayter (GBR)	Elia Viviani (ITA)	Casper Von Folsach (DEN)
2019 Apeldoorn	Benjamin Thomas (FRA)	Lasse Norman Hansen (DEN)	Oliver Wood (GBR)
2020 Plovdiv	Matthew Walls (GBR)	Yauheni Karaliok (BLR)	Iúri Leitão (POR)
2021 Grenchen	Alan Banaszek (POL)	Fabio Van den Bossche (BEL)	Matias Malmberg (DEN)
2022 Munich	Donavan Grondin (FRA)	Simone Consonni (ITA)	Sebastian Mora (ESP)
2023 Grenchen	Benjamin Thomas (FRA)	Simone Consonni (ITA)	William Perrett (GBR)
2024 Apeldoorn	Ethan Hayter (GBR)	Niklas Larsen (DEN)	Fabio Van den Bossche (BEL)
2025 Heusden-Zolder	Tim Torn Teutenberg (GER)	Niklas Larsen (DEN)	Philip Heijnen (NED)
2026 Konya	Iúri Leitão (POR)	Yanne Dorenbos (NED)	Roger Kluge (GER)

=== Older events ===
Before 2010, European championships Omnium events were held as European Criterion or Winter Championship (1956–1971).

From 1972 to 1990 they were organized by the FICP as European Championship. Since 1995 the UEC is responsible for all European championships.

Championships	Gold	Silver	Bronze
1956 Zürich	Armin von Büren (SUI)	Jacques Bellenger (FRA)	Rik Van Steenbergen (BEL)
1957–1958	Not held		
1959 Dortmund	Rik Van Steenbergen (BEL)	Palle Lykke (DEN)	Günther Ziegler (GER)
1961 Kopenhagen	Fritz Pfenninger (SUI)	Peter Post (NED)	Rik Van Steenbergen (BEL)
1962 Dortmund	Palle Lykke (DEN)	Rik Van Steenbergen (BEL)	Fritz Pfenninger (SUI)
1963 Köln	Rudi Altig (GER)	Peter Post (NED)	Rik Van Steenbergen (BEL)
1964 Köln	Peter Post (NED)	Fritz Pfenninger (SUI)	Hans Junkermann (GER)
1965 Brussels	Patrick Sercu (BEL)	Peter Post (NED)	Ferdinand Bracke (BEL)
1966 Köln	Rudi Altig (GER)	Rik Van Steenbergen (BEL)	Peter Post (NED)
1967 Gent	Patrick Sercu (BEL)	Peter Post (NED)	Tom Simpson (GB)
1968 Gent	Patrick Sercu (BEL)	Eddy Merckx (BEL)	Ron Baensch (AUS)
1969 Charleroi	Patrick Sercu (BEL)	Peter Post (NED)	Robert Lelangue (BEL)
1970 Gent	Patrick Sercu (BEL)	Eddy Merckx (BEL)	Peter Post (NED)
1971 Brussels	Patrick Sercu (BEL)	Rudi Altig (GER)	Peter Post (NED)
1972 Gent	Patrick Sercu (BEL)	Graeme Gilmore (AUS)	René Pijnen (NED)
1973 Köln	Patrick Sercu (BEL)	Graeme Gilmore (AUS)	Alain van Lancker (NED)
1974 Berlin	Graeme Gilmore (AUS)	Leo Duyndam (NED)	Günther Haritz (GER)
1975 Grenoble	Eddy Merckx (BEL)	Alain van Lancker (NED)	Roy Schuiten (NED)
1976 Rotterdam	Patrick Sercu (BEL)	Günther Haritz (GER)	Danny Clark (AUS)
1977 Antwerp	Patrick Sercu (BEL)	Danny Clark (AUS)	Freddy Maertens (BEL)
1978 Milan	Danny Clark (AUS)	Roman Hermann (LIE)	Freddy Maertens (BEL)
1979 Vienna	Danny Clark (AUS)	Patrick Sercu (BEL)	Dietrich Thurau (GER)
1980 Gent	Patrick Sercu (BEL)	Danny Clark (AUS)	Roman Hermann (LIE)
1981 Milan	Urs Freuler (SUI)	Anthony Doyle (GB)	Patrick Sercu (BEL)
1982 Zürich	Urs Freuler (SUI)	Robert Dill-Bundi (SUI)	Patrick Sercu (BEL)
1983 Herning	Gert Frank (DEN)	Urs Freuler (SUI)	Anthony Doyle (GB)
1984 Kopenhagen	Danny Clark (AUS)	Gert Frank (DEN)	Urs Freuler (SUI)
1985 Gent	Danny Clark (AUS)	Josef Kristen (GER)	Ferdi Van Den Haute (BEL)
1986 Genève	Josef Kristen (GER)	Urs Freuler (SUI)	Sigmund Hermann (LIE)
1987 Gent	Danny Clark (AUS)	Urs Freuler (SUI)	Pierangelo Bincoletto (ITA)
1988 Zürich	Urs Freuler (SUI)	Josef Kristen (GER)	Volker Diehl (GER)
1989 Kopenhagen	Anthony Doyle (GB)	Volker Diehl (GER)	Michael Marcussen (DEN)
1990 Gent	Etienne De Wilde (BEL)	Peter Pieters (NED)	Konstantin Khrabsov (URS)
1991 Grenoble	Konstantin Khrabsov (URS)	Jens Veggerby (DEN)	Philippe Tarantini (FRA)
1992–1994	Not held		
1995 Valencia	Peter Pieters (NED)	Franz Stocher (AUT)	Jérôme Neuville (FRA)
1996 Moscow	Jérôme Neuville (FRA)	Guido Fulst (GER)	Peter Pieters (NED)
1997 Berlin	Jérôme Neuville (FRA)	Robert Hayles (GB)	Guido Fulst (GER)
1998 Stettin	Olaf Pollack (GER)	Mario Vonhof (GER)	Robert Karśnicki (POL)
1999 Dalmine	Robert Karśnicki (POL)	Lubor Tesař (CZE)	Vassil Iàkovliev (UKR)
2000	Not held		
2001 Brno	Franco Marvulli (SUI)	Alexander Äschbach (SUI)	Franz Stocher (AUT)
2002 Büttgen	Franco Marvulli (SUI)	Alexander Äschbach (SUI)	Roland Garber (AUT)
2003 Moscow	Franco Marvulli (SUI)	Lyubomyr Polatayko (UKR)	Angelo Ciccone (ITA)
2004 Valencia	Alexei Markov (RUS)	Angelo Ciccone (ITA)	Petr Lazar (CZE)
2005 Fiorenzuola d'Arda	Linas Balčiūnas (LIT)	Tomas Vaitkus (LIT)	Konstantin Ponomarev (RUS)
2006 Athens	Jens Mouris (NED)	Rafał Ratajczyk (POL)	Franco Marvulli (SUI)
2007 Cottbus	Unai Elorriaga (ESP)	Rafał Ratajczyk (POL)	Jens Mouris (NED)
2008 Pruszków	Wim Stroetinga (NED)	Robert Bartko (GER)	Elia Viviani (ITA)
2009 Gent	Rafał Ratajczyk (POL)	Robert Bartko (GER)	Unai Elorriaga (ESP)
