= 2016 UEC European Track Championships (under-23 & junior) =

Coordinates: 49.1847°N 16.5790°E

- Venue: Montichiari, Italy
- Date: 12–17 July 2016
- Velodrome: Velodromo Fassa Bortolo
- Events: 38

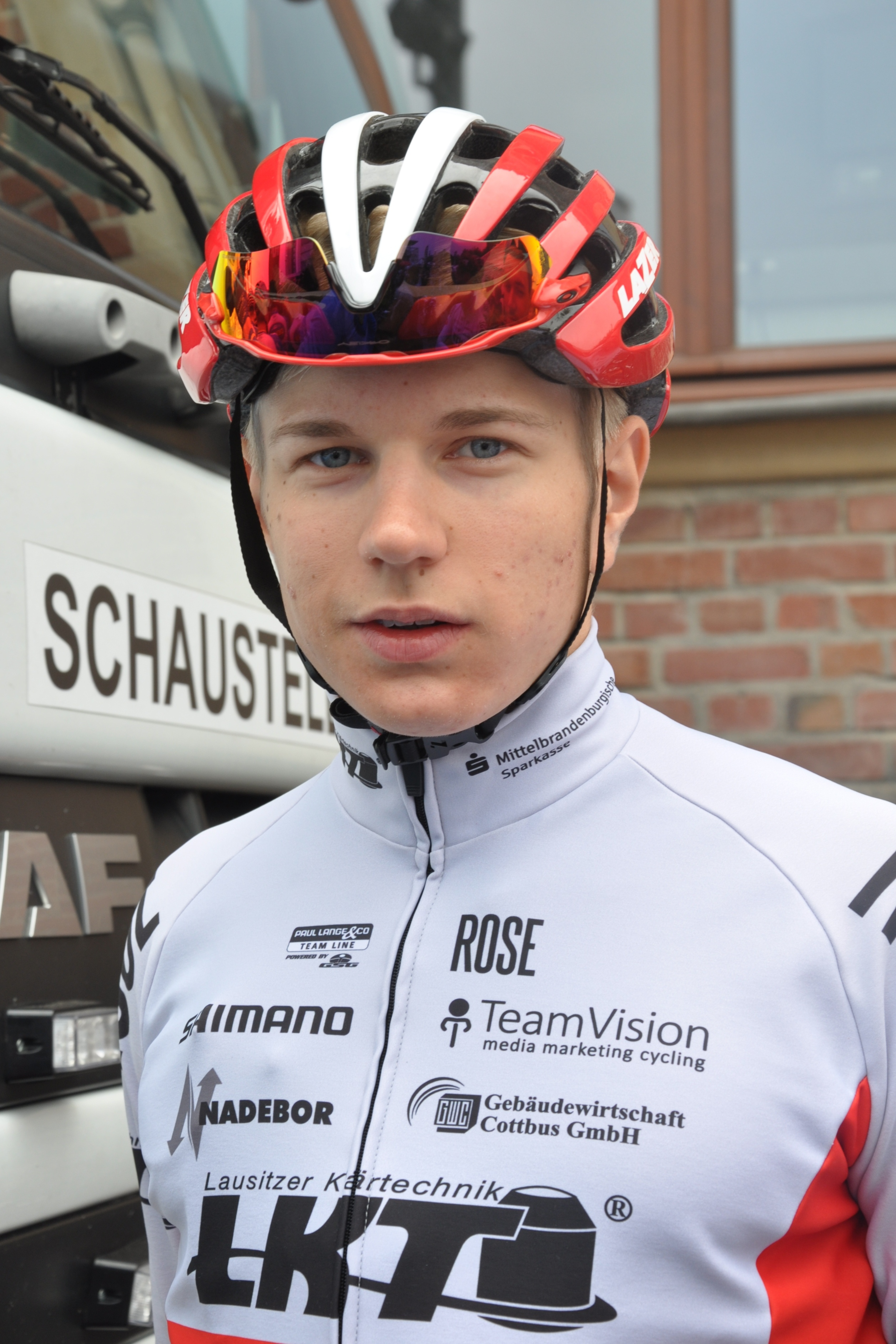
Rund um Köln 2016 051

The 2016 UEC European Track Championships (under-23 & junior) were the 16th continental championships for European under-23 and junior track cyclists, and the 7th since the event was renamed following the reorganisation of European track cycling in 2010. The event took place at the Velodromo Fassa Bortolo in Montichiari, Italy from 12 to 17 July 2016.

== Medal summary ==
=== Under 23 ===
Event	Gold		Silver		Bronze	
Men's events
Sprint	Mateusz Rudyk; Poland		Sébastien Vigier; France		Vasilijus Lendel; Lithuania	
1 km time trial	Maximilian Dörnbach; Germany	1:01.315	Jiří Janošek; Czech Republic	1:01.328	Joseph Truman; Great Britain	1:01.742
Individual pursuit	Filippo Ganna; Italy	4:14.165	Ivo Oliveira; Portugal	4:17.448	Thomas Denis; France	4:20.878
Team pursuit	Thomas Denis; Corentin Ermenault; Florian Maitre; Benjamin Thomas; France	3:56.277	Simone Consonni; Filippo Ganna; Francesco Lamon; Davide Plebani; Italy	3:56.393	Matthew Bostock; Joe Holt; Mark Stewart; Oliver Wood; Great Britain	3:59.396
Team sprint	Jack Carlin; Ryan Owens; Joseph Truman; Great Britain	43.955	Jiri Fanta; David Sojka; Jiří Janošek; Czech Republic	44.642	Richard Assmus; Maximilian Dörnbach; Jan May; Germany	43.973
Keirin	Thomas Copponi; France		Marc Kurczyk; Germany		Michal Lewandowski; Poland	
Scratch	Michal Rzeznicki; Poland		Mark Stewart; Great Britain		Nico Selenati; Switzerland	
Points race	Jonathan Dibben; Great Britain	125 pts	Mark Downey; Ireland	111 pts	Raman Ramanau; Belarus	101 pts
Madison	Maxim Piskunov; Sergey Rostovtsev; Russia	10 pts	Florian Maitre; Benjamin Thomas; France	10 pts	Alan Banaszek; Daniel Staniszewski; Poland	8 pts
Omnium	Thomas Boudat; France	262 pts	Szymon Sajnok; Poland	217 pts	Ivo Oliveira; Portugal	193 pts
Women's events
Sprint	Elis Ligtlee; Netherlands		Tatiana Kiseleva; Russia		Melissandre Pain; France	
500 m time trial	Elis Ligtlee; Netherlands	34.049	Tatiana Kiseleva; Russia	34.570	Melissandre Pain; France	34.898
Individual pursuit	Justyna Kaczkowska; Poland	3:31.307	Daria Pikulik; Poland	3:33.479	Ina Savenka; Belarus	3:32.585
Team pursuit	Emily Kay; Dannielle Khan; Manon Lloyd; Emily Nelson; Great Britain	4:24.386	Martina Alzini; Michela Maltese; Francesca Pattaro; Claudia Cretti; Maria Vittoria Sperotto^{[Q]} Italy	OVL	Monika Graczewska; Justyna Kaczkowska; Łucja Pietrzak; Daria Pikulik; Poland	4:28.760
Team sprint	Kyra Lamberink; Elis Ligtlee; Netherlands	33.504	Nataliia Antonova; Tatiana Kiseleva; Russia	33.786	Julita Jagodzińska; Urszula Łoś; Katarzyna Kirschenstein^{[Q]} Poland	34.722
Keirin	Elis Ligtlee; Netherlands		Nicky Degrendele; Belgium		Miglė Marozaitė; Lithuania	
Scratch	Rachele Barbieri; Italy		Soline Lamboley; France		Dannielle Khan; Great Britain	
Points race	Lotte Kopecky; Belgium	44 pts	Emily Nelson; Great Britain	38 pts	Tatjana Paller; Germany	36 pts
Omnium	Lotte Kopecky; Belgium	214 pts	Ina Savenka; Belarus	185 pts	Emily Kay; Great Britain	181 pts

=== Junior ===
Event	Gold		Silver		Bronze	
Men's events
Sprint	Martin Čechman; Czech Republic		Mateusz Milek; Poland		Ayrton De Pauw; Belgium	
1 km time trial	Ayrton De Pauw; Belgium	1:03.302	Dawid Czubak; Poland	1:03.967	Alejandro Martinez Chorro; Spain	1:04.157
Individual pursuit^{[J]}	Georgios Stavrakakis; Greece	3:18.812	Ivan Smirnov; Russia	3:19.764	Reece Wood; Great Britain	3:19.326
Team pursuit	Ethan Hayter; Matthew Walls; Reece Wood; Fred Wright; Great Britain	4:04.142	Dawid Czubak; Szymon Krawczyk; Patryk Pazik; Bartosz Rudyk; Poland	4:08.284	Arseny Nikiforov; Sergei Malnev; Aleksandr Smirnov; Ivan Smirnov; Anatolii Korepin^{[Q]} Russia	4:09.551
Team sprint	Mikhail Dmitriev; Dmitrii Nesterov; Pavek Rostov; Russia	45.571	Krystian Ruta; Mateusz Milek; Daniel Rochna; Dawid Jankowski^{[Q]} Poland	45.783	Alexander Joliffe; Lewis Stewart; Hamish Turnbull; Great Britain	46.838
Keirin	Martin Čechman; Czech Republic		Timo Bichler; Germany		Dmitrii Nesterov; Russia	
Scratch	Jules Hesters; Belgium		Luca Felix Happke; Germany		Oleksandr Krivich; Ukraine	
Points race	Dawid Czubak; Poland	49 pts	Matteo Donegà; Italy	36 pts	Gerben Thijssen; Belgium	32 pts
Madison	Rhys Britton; Matthew Walls; Great Britain	10 pts	Jules Hesters; Gerben Thijssen; Belgium	17 pts (1 lap down)	Sergei Malnev; Aleksandr Smirnov; Russia	12 pts (1 lap down)
Omnium	Szymon Krawczyk; Poland	203 pts	Ethan Hayter; Great Britain	192 pts	Bas Ottevanger; Netherlands	184 pts
Women's events
Sprint	Mathilde Gros; France		Hetty van de Wouw; Netherlands		Sára Kaňkovská; Czech Republic	
500 m time trial	Mathilde Gros; France	34.836	Hetty van de Wouw; Netherlands	35.268	Sophie Capewell; Great Britain	35.873
Individual pursuit^{[J]}	Olivija Baleišytė; Lithuania	2:23.329^{[R]}	Mariia Novolodskaia; Russia	2:24.893	Nikola Rozynska; Poland	2:25.104
Team pursuit	Elisa Balsamo; Chiara Consonni; Letizia Paternoster; Martina Stefani; Italy	4:29.234; WJR	Marit Raaijmakers; Amber van der Hulst; Kristie van Haaften; Bente van Teeseling; Netherlands	OVL	Eleanor Dickinson; Lauren Dolan; Rebecca Raybould; Jessica Roberts; Great Britain	4:39.350
Team sprint	Hetty van de Wouw; Steffie van der Peet; Netherlands	34.367	Martina Fidanza; Gloria Manzoni; Italy	34.703	Lauren Bate-Lowe; Sophie Capewell; Great Britain	35.416
Keirin	Sára Kaňkovská; Czech Republic		Aleksandra Tolomanow; Poland		Steffie van der Peet; Netherlands	
Scratch	Letizia Paternoster; Italy		Maria Martins; Portugal		Wiktoria Pikulik; Poland	
Points race	Letizia Paternoster; Italy	53 pts	Marit Raaijmakers; Netherlands	27 pts	Rebecca Raybould; Great Britain	12 pts
Omnium	Elisa Balsamo; Italy	186 pts	Olivija Baleišytė; Lithuania	184 pts	Jessica Roberts; Great Britain	182 pts

=== Notes ===
- ^{^{J}} In junior competitions, individual pursuits are contested over 3 km/2 km for men/women respectively.
- ^{^{Q}} Competitors named in italics contested the qualifying rounds only.
- ^{^{R}} In the qualifying round, Olivija Baleišytė clocked a 2:22.311 WJR.

== Medal table ==
Rank	Nation	Gold	Silver	Bronze	Total
1	Italy (ITA)	6	4	0	10
2	Poland (POL)	5	7	6	18
3	Netherlands (NED)	5	4	2	11
4	Great Britain (GBR)	5	3	11	19
5	France (FRA)	5	3	3	11
6	Belgium (BEL)	4	2	2	8
7	Czech Republic (CZE)	3	2	1	6
8	Russia (RUS)	2	5	3	10
9	Germany (GER)	1	3	2	6
10	Lithuania (LTU)	1	1	2	4
11	Greece (GRE)	1	0	0	1
12	Portugal (POR)	0	2	1	3
13	Belarus (BLR)	0	1	2	3
14	Ireland (IRL)	0	1	0	1
15	Spain (ESP)	0	0	1	1
15	Switzerland (SUI)	0	0	1	1
15	Ukraine (UKR)	0	0	1	1
Totals (17 entries)		38	38	38	114
