= 2008 UEC European Track Championships =

- Venue: Pruszków, Poland
- Date: 3–7 September 2008
- Velodrome: BGŻ Arena
- Events: 34+3

The 2008 European Track Championships took place in Pruszków, Poland from 3 September to 7 September 2008. They were the annual European championship for track cycling for junior and under 23 riders. Events were also held at elite level in the women's omnium discipline. A men's omnium European Championship was held in Alkmaar, the Netherlands at 18 October 2008.

== Countries ==
- Belarus at the 2008 UEC European Track Championships
- (United Kingdom) Great Britain at the 2008 UEC European Track Championships
- Lithuania at the 2008 UEC European Track Championships
- Netherlands at the 2008 UEC European Track Championships

Incomplete list

== Medal summary ==
=== Open ===
Open events were held in the omnium discipline only.

Event	Gold		Silver		Bronze	
Men's Event held in Alkmaar, the Netherlands on 18 October 2008.
Men's Omnium	Wim Stroetinga; Netherlands	44	Robert Bartko; Germany	40	Elia Viviani; Italy	38
Women's Event held in Pruszków, Poland in September 2008.
Women's Omnium	Elena Tchalykh; Russia	46	Ellen van Dijk; Netherlands	41	Anastasia Tchulkova; Russia	41

=== Omnium sprint ===
Année	Gold	Silver	Bronze
2008	NED Theo Bos	NED Tim Veldt	FRA François Pervis
2008	NED Yvonne Hijgenaar	NED Elise Van Hage	ESP Helena Casas Roige

=== Under 23 ===
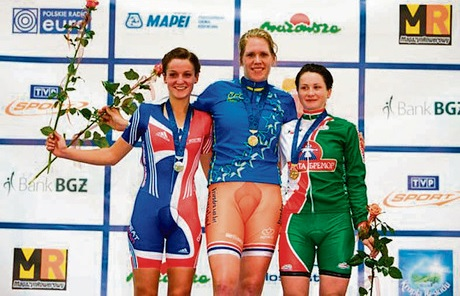
Podium of the Women's under-23 points race: 1) Ellen van Dijk, 2) Lizzie Armitstead, 3) Aksana Papko

Event	Gold		Silver		Bronze	
Men's events
Men's under-23 sprint	Kévin Sireau; France		Michaël D'Almeida; France		Matthew Crampton; Great Britain	
Men's under-23 1 km time trial	Michaël D'Almeida; France		David Daniell; Great Britain		Tomáš Bábek; Czech Republic	
Men's under-23 individual pursuit	Vitaliy Shchedov; Ukraine	4:25.518	Jerôme Cousin; France	4:29.383	Marco Coledan; Italy	
Men's under-23 team pursuit	Steven Burke; Peter Kennaugh; Mark McNally; Andy Tennant; Great Britain	4:05.568	Evgeny Kovalev; Ivan Kovalev; Alexander Petrovskiy; Valery Valynin; Russia	4:10.139	Marcel Kalz; Ralf Matzka; Erik Mohs; Fabian Schaar; Italy	4:07.730
Men's under-23 team sprint	Denis Dmitriev; Stoyan Vasev; Pavel Yakushevskiy; Russia	44.991	Matthew Crampton; David Daniell; Christian Lyte; Great Britain	45.277	Krzysztof Szymanek; Maciej Bielecki; Adrian Telinski; Poland	45.768
Men's under-23 keirin	Matthew Crampton; Great Britain		Michaël D'Almeida; France		Denis Špička; Czech Republic	
Men's under-23 scratch race	Elia Viviani; Italy		Pim Ligthart; Netherlands		Jiří Hochmann; Czech Republic	
Men's under-23 points race	Ivan Kovalev; Russia	31	Ralf Matzka; Germany	30	Jiří Hochmann; Czech Republic	30
Women's events
Women's under-23 sprint	Miriam Welte; Germany	12.206 / 11.898	Lyubov Shulika; Ukraine		Anna Blyth; Great Britain	12.045 / 12.046
Women's under-23 500 m time trial	Sandie Clair; France	33.872	Miriam Welte; Germany	34.376	Anna Blyth; Great Britain	35.035
Women's under-23 individual pursuit	Vilija Sereikaitė; Lithuania	3:34.781	Ellen van Dijk; Netherlands	3:37.747	Joanna Rowsell; Great Britain	
Women's under-23 team pursuit	Lizzie Armitstead; Katie Colclough; Joanna Rowsell; Great Britain	3:26.836	Audrey Cordon; Elodie Henriette; Pascale Jeuland; France	3:35.026	Victoriya Kondel; Oxana Cozonchuk; Maria Mishina; Russia	3:35.369
Women's under-23 team sprint	Sandie Clair; Virginie Cueff; France	34.481	Renata Dąbrowska; Marta Janowiak; Poland	36.303	Yulia Kosheleva; Olga Strelsova; Russia	36.865
Women's under-23 keirin	Miriam Welte; Germany		Sandie Clair; France		Lyubov Shulika; Ukraine	
Women's under-23 scratch race	Ellen van Dijk^{i} Netherlands Lizzie Armitstead^{i} Great Britain		N/A		Evgenia Romanyuta; Russia	
Women's under-23 points race	Ellen van Dijk; Netherlands	32	Lizzie Armitstead; Great Britain	27	Aksana Papko; Belarus	24

i) There were awarded 2 gold medals (and no silver medal) because Ellen van Dijk and Lizzie Armitstead finished at the same time. See the finishfoto.

=== Juniors ===
Event	Gold		Silver		Bronze	
Men's events
Junior Men's Sprint	Quentin Lafargue; France		Charlie Conord; France		Peter Mitchell; Great Britain	
Junior Men's 1 km Time Trial	Quentin Lafargue; France		Thomas Bonafos; France		Loris Paoli; Italy	
Junior Men's Individual Pursuit	Albert Torres Barcelo; Spain	3:19.404	Artur Ershov; Russia	3:22.034	Mark Christian; Great Britain	3:19:683
Junior Men's Team Pursuit	Julien Duval; Emmanuel Keo; Julien Morice; Erwan Teguel; France	4:09.231	Luke Rowe; Mark Christian; Andrew Fenn; Erick Rowsell; Great Britain	4:09.559	Thomas Juhas; Johannes Kahra; Theo Reinhardt; Jakob Steigmiller; Germany	4:14.424
Junior Men's Team Sprint	Charlie Conord; Thierry Jollet; Quentin Lafargue; France	45.618	Steven Hill; Luc Jones; Peter Mitchell; Great Britain	46.435	Grzegorz Drejgier; Karol Kasprzyk; Rafal Sarnecki; Poland	45.768
Junior Men's Keirin	Charlie Conord; France		Steven Hill; Great Britain		Juan Peralta Gascon; Spain	
Junior Men's Scratch	Claudio Imhof; Switzerland		Konstantin Kuperasov; Russia		Vitaly Barbas; Russia	
Junior Men's Points Race	Sam Bennett; Ireland	29	Albert Torres Barcelo; Spain	18	Michał Kwiatkowski; Poland	16
Junior Men's Madison	Mark Christian; Luke Rowe; Great Britain	20	Niki Byrgese; Sebastian Lander; Denmark	18	Thomas Juhas; Jakob Steigmiller; Germany	15 (-1 lap)
Women's events
Junior Women's Sprint	Victoria Baranova; Russia	12.270 / 12.147	Barbora Drzkova; Slovakia		Jessica Varnish; Great Britain	13.462 / 12.359
Junior Women's 500 m Time Trial	Jessica Varnish; Great Britain	35.364	Victoria Baranova; Russia	35.788	Magali Baudacci; France	36.083
Junior Women's Individual Pursuit	Hannah Mayho; Great Britain	2:28.175	Jolien D'Hoore; Belgium	2:28.537	Lucie Záleská; Czech Republic	2:28.874
Junior Women's Team Pursuit	Alex Greenfield; Hannah Mayho; Jessica Booth; Great Britain	2:19.612	Evelyn Arys; Jessie Daams; Jolien D'Hoore; Belgium	2:20.456	Giada Balzan; Rossella Callovi; Valentina Scandolara; Italy	2:22.213
Junior Women's Team Sprint	Aleksandra Drejgier; Kornelia Maczka; Poland	35.562	Magali Baudacci; Olivia Montauban; France	36.303	Victoria Baranova; Eena Melnichenko; Russia	36.865
Junior Women's Keirin	Jessica Varnish; Great Britain		Galina Streltsova; Russia		Giada Balzan; Italy	
Junior Women's Scratch	Lucie Záleská; Czech Republic		Valentina Scandolara; Italy		Jolien D'Hoore; Belgium	
Junior Women's Points Race	Alex Greenfield; Great Britain	21	Jolien D'Hoore; Belgium	12	Amy Pieters; Netherlands	12

== Medal table ==
Rank	Nation	Gold	Silver	Bronze	Total
1	Great Britain (GBR)	10	6	7	23
2	France (FRA)	9	8	2	19
3	Netherlands (NED)	5	5	1	11
4	Russia (RUS)	4	5	6	15
5	Germany (GER)	2	3	2	7
6	Italy (ITA)	1	1	6	8
7	Poland (POL)	1	1	3	5
8	Spain (ESP)	1	1	2	4
9	Ukraine (UKR)	1	1	1	3
10	Czech Republic (CZE)	1	0	5	6
11	Ireland (IRL)	1	0	0	1
11	Lithuania (LTU)	1	0	0	1
11	Switzerland (SUI)	1	0	0	1
14	Belgium (BEL)	0	3	1	4
15	Denmark (DEN)	0	1	0	1
15	Slovakia (SVK)	0	1	0	1
17	Belarus (BLR)	0	0	1	1
Totals (17 entries)		38	36	37	111

== See also ==
- 2008 in track cycling
