= 2013 European Track Championships (under-23 & junior) =

Track cycling championships

- 2013 European Track Championships (under-23 & junior) logo
- Venue: Anadia, Portugal
- Date: 9–14 July 2013
- Velodrome: Velódromo Nacional de Sangalhos
- Events: 38

The 2013 European Track Championships are the European Championships for track cycling. The junior and under 23 riders events took place at the Velódromo Nacional de Sangalhos in Anadia, Portugal from 9 to 14 July 2013.

This year, the women's team pursuit event differed in that the number of riders in each team had increased from 3 to 4, and correspondingly, the distance covered changed from 3 km to 4 km.

== Medal summary ==
=== Under 23 ===
Event	Gold		Silver		Bronze	
Men's events
Men's under-23 sprint	Pavel Kelemen; Czech Republic		Erik Balzer; Germany		Hugo Haak; Netherlands	
Men's under-23 1 km time trial	Robin Wagner; Czech Republic	1:01.917	Eric Engler; Germany	1:02.015	Krzysztof Maksel; Poland	1:02.085
Men's under-23 individual pursuit	Stefan Küng; Switzerland	4:21.338	Alexander Evtushenko; Russia	4:26.428	Ryan Mullen; Ireland	4:25.371
Men's under-23 team pursuit	Tom Bohli; Théry Schir; Frank Pasche; Stefan Küng; Poland	4:02.466	Fabien Le Coguic; Julien Morice; Bryan Coquard; Romain Le Roux; France	4:07.870	Ondrej Vendolsky; František Sisr; Denis Rugovac; Ondřej Rybín; Czech Republic	4:08.295
Men's under-23 team sprint	Erik Balzer; Eric Engler; Max Niederlag; Germany	44.286	Pavel Kelemen; Robin Wagner; Jakub Vyvoda; Czech Republic	44.854	Matthijs Büchli; Jeffrey Hoogland; Hugo Haak; Netherlands	44.653
Men's under-23 keirin	Pavel Kelemen; Czech Republic		Benjamin Edelin; France		Erik Balzer; Germany	
Men's under-23 scratch race	Anton Muzychkin; Belarus		Bryan Coquard; France		Ryan Mullen; Ireland	
Men's under-23 points race	Thomas Boudat; France	56 pts	Théry Schir; Switzerland	44 pts	Raman Ramanau; Belarus	38 pts
U23 Men's Madison	Bryan Coquard; Thomas Boudat; France	19 pts	Théry Schir; Stefan Küng; Switzerland	16 pts	Ivan Savitckii; Andrey Sazanov; Russia	13 pts
U23 Men's Omnium	Jasper de Buyst; Belgium	18 pts	Casper von Folsach; Denmark	24 pts	Thomas Boudat; France	24 pts
Women's events
Women's under-23 sprint	Anastasiia Voinova; Russia		Tania Calvo Barbero; Spain		Elis Ligtlee; Netherlands	
Women's under-23 500 m time trial	Elis Ligtlee; Netherlands	34.020	Daria Shmeleva; Russia	34.622	Tania Calvo Barbero; Spain	34.629
Women's under-23 individual pursuit	Laura Trott; Great Britain	3:32.478	Elinor Barker; Great Britain	3:37.468	Lucie Záleská; Czech Republic	3:40.894
Women's under-23 team pursuit	Arianna Fidanza; Francesca Pattaro; Michela Maltese; Maria Vittoria Sperotto; Italy	4:40.109	Natalia Mozharova; Anastasia Buchneva; Svetlana Vasilieva; Maria Kantcyber; Russia	4:42.767	Kaat Van der Meulen; Lotte Kopecky; Jesse Vandenbulcke; Saartje Vandenbroucke; Belgium	4:41.886
Women's under-23 team sprint	Shanne Braspennincx; Elis Ligtlee; Netherlands	33.772	Ekaterina Gnidenko; Anastasiia Voinova; Russia	33.807	Becky James; Victoria Williamson; Great Britain	34.512
Women's under-23 keirin	Shanne Braspennincx; Netherlands		Olivia Montauban; France		Yesna Rijkhoff; Netherlands	
Women's under-23 scratch race	Maria Giulia Confalonieri; Italy		Laurie Berthon; France		Lucie Záleská; Czech Republic	
Women's under-23 points race	Laura Trott; Great Britain	41 pts (+1 lap)	Elinor Barker; Great Britain	32 pts (+1 lap)	Maria Giulia Confalonieri; Italy	30 pts (+1 lap)
U23 Women's Omnium	Laura Trott; Great Britain	20 pts	Laurie Berthon; France	24 pts	Lucie Záleská; Czech Republic	25 pts

=== Junior ===
Event	Gold		Silver		Bronze	
Men's events
Junior Men's Sprint	Maximilian Dornbach; Germany		Svajunas Jonauskas; Lithuania		Sergey Gorlov; Russia	
Junior Men's 1 km Time Trial	Alexander Dubchenko; Russia	1:02.807	Maximilian Dornbach; Germany	1:03.483	Thomas Copponi; France	1:03.799
Junior Men's Individual Pursuit	Pavel Chursin; Russia	3:22.205	Valentin Madouas; France	3:23.241	Corentin Ermenault; France	3:22.756
Junior Men's Team Pursuit	Timur Izzatullin; Dmitrii Strakhov; Sergei Mosin; Andrey Prostokishin; Russia	4:10.681	Clement Barbeau; Jordan Levasseur; Corentin Ermenault; Valentin Madouas; France	4:13.068	Simon Brühlmann; Chiron Keller; Nico Selenati; Patrick Muller; Switzerland	4:16.222
Junior Men's Team Sprint	Jan May; Maximilian Dörnbach; Patryk Rahn; Germany	45.473	Alexander Dubchenko; Vladislav Fedin; Alexey Lysenko; Russia	45.847	Patryk Rajkowski; Mateusz Rudyk; Jakub Stecko; Poland	46.248
Junior Men's Keirin	Alexander Dubchenko; Russia		Jan May; Germany		Uladzislau Novik; Belarus	
Junior Men's Scratch	Maksim Andreyev; Russia		Rui Filipe Alves Oliveira; Portugal		Zisis Soulis; Greece	
Junior Men's Points Race	Pavel Chursin; Russia	29 pts	Seid Lizde; Italy	18 pts	Matthias Osei Vertez; Belgium	13 pts
Junior Men's Madison	Jordan Levasseur; Corentin Ermenault; France	18 pts	Vladislav Kreminskyy; Roman Gladysh; Ukraine	14 pts	Clement Barbeau; Lucas Destang; France	14 pts
Junior Men's Omnium	Lindsay De Vylder; Belgium	29 pts	Riccardo Minali; Italy	29 pts	Jordan Levasseur; France	30 pts
Women's events
Junior Women's Sprint	Melissandre Pain; France		Nicky Degrendele; Belgium		Doreen Heinze; Germany	
Junior Women's 500 m Time Trial	Melissandre Pain; France	35.387	Doreen Heinze; Germany	36.261	Tatiana Kiseleva; Russia	36.295
Junior Women's Individual Pursuit	Lotte Kopecky; Belgium	2:28.680	Olena Demidova; Ukraine	2:31.362	Michela Maltese; Italy	2:28.867
Junior Women's Team Pursuit	Arianna Fidanza; Francesca Pattaro; Michela Maltese; Maria Vittoria Sperotto; Italy	4:40.109; WR	Natalia Mozharova; Anastasia Buchneva; Svetlana Vasilieva; Maria Kantcyber; Russia	4:42.767	Kaat van der Meulen; Lotte Kopecky; Jesse Vandenbulcke; Saartje Vandenbroucke; Belgium	4:41.886
Junior Women's Team Sprint	Tatiana Kiseleva; Ekaterina Rogovaya; Russia	35.664	Doreen Heinze; Lisa Klein; Germany	36.196	Nicky Degrendele; Catherine Wernimont; Belgium	35.699
Junior Women's Keirin	Melissandre Pain; France		Nicky Degrendele; Belgium		Kyra Lamberink; Netherlands	
Junior Women's Scratch	Claudia Cretti; Italy		Natasha Grillo; Italy		Kaat van der Meulen; Belgium	
Junior Women's Points Race	Lotte Kopecky; Belgium	29 pts	Kaat van der Meulen; Belgium	16 pts	Bianca Lust; Netherlands	13 pts
Junior Women's Omnium	Łucja Pietrzak; Poland	21 pts	Edita Mazureviciute; Lithuania	26 pts	Soline Lamboley; France	26 pts

== Medal table ==
Rank	Nation	Gold	Silver	Bronze	Total
1	Russia (RUS)	9	5	3	17
2	France (FRA)	6	8	6	20
3	Belgium (BEL)	4	3	4	11
4	Germany (GER)	3	6	2	11
5	Italy (ITA)	3	3	3	9
6	Great Britain (GBR)	3	2	1	6
7	Czech Republic (CZE)	3	1	4	8
8	Netherlands (NED)	3	0	6	9
9	Switzerland (SUI)	2	2	1	5
10	Belarus (BLR)	1	0	2	3
10	Poland (POL)	1	0	2	3
12	Ukraine (UKR)	0	3	0	3
13	Lithuania (LTU)	0	2	0	2
14	Spain (ESP)	0	1	1	2
15	Denmark (DEN)	0	1	0	1
15	Portugal (POR)	0	1	0	1
17	Ireland (IRL)	0	0	2	2
18	Greece (GRE)	0	0	1	1
Totals (18 entries)		38	38	38	114
