= European Track Championships – Women's under-23 points race =

UEC European Champion jersey

The Women's under-23 points race at the European Track Championships was first competed in 1999.

== Medalists ==
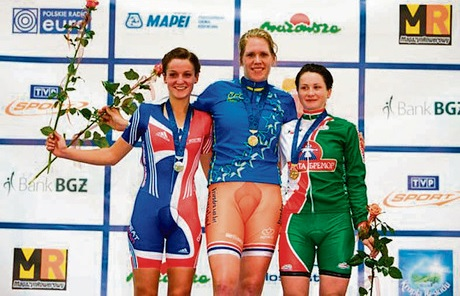
Podium of the points race in 2008: 1) Ellen van Dijk, 2) Lizzie Armitstead, 3) Aksana Papko

Championships	Gold	Silver	Bronze
1999	Mirella van Melis (NED)	Szilvia Szabolcsi (HUN)	Cornelia Cyrus (GER)
2001 Brno	Lada Kozlíková (CZE)	Lyudmyla Vypyraylo (UKR)	Katrin Meinke (GER)
2002 Büttgen	Vera Koedooder (NED)	Giorgia Bronzini (ITA)	Yulia Aroustamova (RUS)
2003 Moscow	Giorgia Bronzini (ITA)	Eleonora Soldo (ITA)	Oxana Kostenko (RUS)
2004 Valencia	Charlotte Becker (GER)	Débora Gálvez Lopez (ESP)	Tatsiana Sharakova (BLR)
2005 Fiorenzuola	Charlotte Becker (GER)	Giorgia Bronzini (ITA)	Nina Köhn (GER)
2006 Athens	Marlijn Binnendijk (NED)	Irina Zemlyanskaya (RUS)	Jarmila Machačová (CZE)
2007 Cottbus	Marlijn Binnendijk (NED)	Lizzie Armitstead (GBR)	Anastasia Tchulkova (RUS)
2008 Pruszków	Ellen van Dijk (NED)	Lizzie Armitstead (GBR)	Aksana Papko (BLR)
2009 Minsk	Marta Tagliaferro (ITA)	Viktoriya Kondel (RUS)	Lesya Kalytovska (UKR)
2010 St. Petersburg	Aksana Papko (BLR)	Marta Tagliaferro (ITA)	Jolien D'Hoore (BEL)
2011 Anadia	Valentina Scandolara (ITA)	Katie Colclough (GBR)	Katarzyna Pawłowska (POL)
2012 Anadia	Jolien D'Hoore (BEL)	Elena Cecchini (ITA)	Maria Giulia Confalonieri (ITA)
2013 Anadia	Laura Trott (GBR)	Elinor Barker (GBR)	Maria Giulia Confalonieri (ITA)
2014 Anadia	Elena Cecchini (ITA)	Maria Giulia Confalonieri (ITA)	Alexandra Chekina (RUS)
2015 Athens	Gulnaz Badykova (RUS)	Ina Savenka (BLR)	Palina Pivavarava (BLR)
2016 Montichiari	Lotte Kopecky (BEL)	Ina Savenka (BLR)	Emily Kay (GBR)
2017 Sangalhos	Tatjana Paller (GER)	Amalie Dideriksen (DEN)	Manon Lloyd (GBR)
2018 Aigle	Diana Klimova (RUS)	Aksana Salauyeva (BLR)	Valentine Fortin (FRA)
2019 Ghent	Natalia Studenikina (RUS)	Wiktoria Pikulik (POL)	Shari Bossuyt (BEL)
2020 Fiorenzuola d'Arda	Silvia Zanardi (ITA)	Shari Bossuyt (BEL)	Franziska Brauße (GER)
2021 Apeldoorn	Silvia Zanardi (ITA)	Shari Bossuyt (BEL)	Viktoriia Yaroshenko (UKR)
