= 2003 UEC European Track Championships =

- Venue: Moscow, Russia
- Date(s): 2003
- Events: 29+3

The 2003 UEC European Track Championships were the European Championships for track cycling, for junior and under 23 riders. They took place in Moscow, Russia.

== Medal summary ==
=== Open ===
Event	Gold	Silver	Bronze
Men's Events
Men's Omnium	(Switzerland) Franco Marvulli	(Ukraine) Lyubomyr Polatayko	(Italy) Angelo Ciccone
Men's Sprint Omnium	(Latvia) Ainārs Ķiksis	(Czech Republic) Ivan Vrba	(Czech Republic) Pavel Buráň
Women's Events
Women's Omnium	(Russia) Olga Slyusareva	(Russia) Elena Tchalykh	(Ukraine) Iryna Yanovych

=== Under 23 ===
Event	Gold	Silver	Bronze
Men's Events
U23 Men's Sprint	(Netherlands) Theo Bos	(Poland) Łukasz Kwiatkowski	(Poland) Damian Zieliński
U23 Men's 1 km Time Trial	(Netherlands) Theo Bos	(Czech Republic) Alois Kaňkovský	(France) Mathieu Mandard
U23 Men's Individual Pursuit	(Ukraine) Volodymyr Dyudya	(Russia) Alexander Serov	(Belarus) Vasil Kiryienka
U23 Men's Team Sprint	France; Grégory Baugé; Matthieu Mandard; François Pervis	Russia; Sergey Borisov; Vladimir Kiriltsev; Denis Terenine	Greece; Kleanthis Bargkas; Dimitrios Georgalis; Labros Vasilopoulos
U23 Men's Team Pursuit	Ukraine; Volodymyr Zagorodny; Vitaliy Popkov; Roman Kononenko; Volodymyr Dyudya	Russia; Mikhail Mikheev; Alexey Shmidt; Alexander Khatuntsev; Ilya Krestianinov	Belarus; Vasil Kiryienka; Viktor Rapinski; Yauhen Sobal; Dzmitry Aulasenka
U23 Men's Keirin	(Netherlands) Teun Mulder	(Netherlands) Theo Bos	(Poland) Damian Zieliński
U23 Men's Points Race	(Russia) Nikita Eskov	(Belarus) Kanstantsin Sivtsov	(Italy) Matteo Montaguti
U23 Men's Madison	(France); Matthieu Ladagnous; Fabien Patanchon	(Russia); Alexey Shmidt; Konstantin Ponomarev	(Belgium); Dimitri De Fauw; Iljo Keisse
U23 Men's Scratch	(Italy) Samuele Marzoli	(Belgium) Dimitri De Fauw	(Denmark) Alex Rasmussen
Women's Events
U23 Women's Sprint	(Russia) Tamilla Abassova	(Lithuania) Simona Krupeckaitė	(France) Céline Nivert
U23 Women's 500 m Time Trial	(Russia) Tamilla Abassova	(Lithuania) Simona Krupeckaitė	(France) Céline Nivert
U23 Women's Individual Pursuit	(Russia) Apollinaria Bakova	(Netherlands) Vera Koedooder	(Russia) Oxana Kostenko
U23 Women's Points Race	(Italy) Giorgia Bronzini	(Italy) Eleonora Soldo	(Russia) Oxana Kostenko
U23 Women's Scratch	(Russia) Yulia Aroustamova	(Ukraine) Sofiya Pryshchepa	(Italy) Giorgia Bronzini
U23 Women's Keirin	(Russia) Tamilla Abassova	(Germany) Christin Muche	(Russia) Yulia Aroustamova

=== Juniors ===
Event	Gold	Silver	Bronze
Men's Events
Junior Men's Sprint	(France) Grégory Baugé	(Czech Republic) Filip Ditzel	(Spain) Alfonso Gomez Sanchez
Junior Men's 1 km Time Trial	(Czech Republic) Filip Ditzel	(Poland) Kamil Kuczyński	(Russia) Anton Rudoy
Junior Men's Individual Pursuit	(Russia) Alexander Khatuntsev	(Netherlands) Levi Heimans	(Russia) Mikhail Ignatiev
Junior Men's Team Pursuit	Russia; Anton Mindlin; Vladimir Isaychev; Nikolai Trussov; Mikhail Ignatiev	Netherlands; Wim Stroetinga; Niels Pieters; Levi Heimans; Kevin Sluimer	Lithuania; Gediminas Bagdonas; Justas Volungevicius; Andrius Buividas; Ignatas Konovalovas
Junior Men's Team Sprint	Poland; Michal Tokarz; Kamil Kuczyński; Pawel Kosciecha	Russia; Anton Rudoy; Stoian Vasev; Denis Dmitriev	Czech Republic; Filip Ditzel; Adam Ptáčník; Jiří Hochmann
Junior Men's Points Race	(Netherlands) Wim Stroetinga	(Belgium) Kenny De Ketele	(Czech Republic) Jiří Hochmann
Junior Men's Scratch	(Ukraine) Dmytro Grabovskyy	(Czech Republic) Filip Ditzel	(Russia) Nikolai Trussov
Junior Men's Keirin	(Russia) Mikhail Shikhalev	(France) Grégory Baugé	(Poland) Michal Tokarz
Women's Events
Junior Women's Sprint	(Ukraine) Valeriya Velychko	(Russia) Ekaterina Merzlikina	(France) Emilie Jeannot
Junior Women's 500 m Time Trial	(France) Emilie Jeannot	(Poland) Magdalena Sara	(Russia) Anastasia Tchulkova
Junior Women's Individual Pursuit	(Netherlands) Marlijn Binnendijk	(Italy) Rebecca Bertolo	(Lithuania) Agne Bagdonaviciute
Junior Women's Points Race	(Russia) Anastasia Tchulkova	(Italy) Rebecca Bertolo	(Belgium) Karen Verbeek
Junior Women's Scratch	(Russia) Ekaterina Merzlikina	(Italy) Annalisa Cucinotta	(France) Emilie Jeannot
Junior Women's Keirin	(Poland) Magdalena Sara	(Russia) Ekaterina Merzlikina	(Poland) Barbara Borucz

== Medal table ==
Rank	Nation	Gold	Silver	Bronze	Total
1	Russia (RUS)	12	8	7	27
2	Netherlands (NED)	5	4	0	9
3	Ukraine (UKR)	4	2	1	7
4	France (FRA)	4	1	5	10
5	Italy (ITA)	2	4	3	9
6	Poland (POL)	2	3	4	9
7	Czech Republic (CZE)	1	4	3	8
8	Latvia (LAT)	1	0	0	1
8	Switzerland (SUI)	1	0	0	1
10	Belgium (BEL)	0	2	2	4
10	Lithuania (LTU)	0	2	2	4
12	Belarus (BLR)	0	1	2	3
13	Germany (GER)	0	1	0	1
14	Denmark (DEN)	0	0	1	1
14	Greece (GRE)	0	0	1	1
14	Spain (ESP)	0	0	1	1
Totals (16 entries)		32	32	32	96
