= Schaar =

Schaar is a surname. Notable people with the surname include:

- Fabian Schaar (born 1989), German cyclist
- Gerhard Schaar (1919–1983), German U-boat commander
- John Schaar (1928–2011), American academic and political theorist
- Marijke Schaar (born 1944), Dutch tennis player
- Tom Schaar (born 1999), American skateboarder

== See also ==
- Erzsébet Schaár (1905–1975), Hungarian sculptor
- Stijn Schaars (born 1984), Dutch footballer
