= 2005 UEC European Track Championships =

Track cycling competition

- Venue: Fiorenzuola d'Arda, Italy
- Date(s): 2005
- Events: 32

The 2005 European Track Championships were the European Championships for track cycling, for junior and under-23 riders. They took place in Fiorenzuola d'Arda, Italy.

== Medal summary ==
=== Open ===
| Event | Gold | Silver | Bronze |
|---|---|---|---|
Men's Events
| Men's Omnium | (Lithuania) Linas Balčiūnas | (Lithuania) Tomas Vaitkus | (Russia) Konstantin Ponomarev |
| Men's Sprint Omnium | (Germany) Marco Jager | (Netherlands) Teun Mulder | (Russia) Sergey Ruban |
Women's Events
| Women's Omnium | (Russia) Olga Slyusareva | (Czech Republic) Lada Kozlíková | (Spain) Gema Pascual Torrecilla |

=== Under 23 ===
| Event | Gold | Silver | Bronze |
|---|---|---|---|
Men's Events
| U23 Men's Sprint | (Germany) Michael Seidenbecher | (United Kingdom) Ross Edgar | (France) Grégory Baugé |
| U23 Men's 1 km Time Trial | (Germany) Michael Seidenbecher | (Czech Republic) Alois Kaňkovský | (Netherlands) Tim Veldt |
| U23 Men's Individual Pursuit | (Ukraine) Volodymyr Dyudya | (Germany) Robert Bengsch | (Netherlands) Levi Heimans |
| U23 Men's Team Pursuit | Russia; Valery Valynin; Ivan Kovalev; Sergey Kolesnikov; Alexander Khatuntsev | Ukraine; Maxim Polischuk; Volodymyr Dyudya; Vitaliy Popkov; Dmytro Grabovskyy | Lithuania; Simas Kondrotas; Aidis Kruopis; Ignatas Konovalovas; Gediminas Bagdonas |
| U23 Men's Team Sprint | Poland; Kamil Kuczyński; Łukasz Kwiatkowski; Damian Zieliński | Germany; Robert Förstemann; Daniel Giese; Marco Jäger | Czech Republic; Alois Kaňkovský; Adam Ptáčník; Ivan Vrba |
| U23 Men's Madison | Denmark; Alex Rasmussen; Michael Mørkøv | Belgium; Kenny De Ketele; Steve Schets | Italy; Samuele Marzoli; Gianpolo Biolo |
| U23 Men's Keirin | (Germany) Michael Seidenbecher | (France) Didier Henriette | (Czech Republic) Adam Ptáčník |
| U23 Men's Scratch | (Denmark) Alex Rasmussen | (Denmark) Marc Hester | (Netherlands) Wim Stroetinga |
| U23 Men's Points Race | (United Kingdom) Mark Cavendish | (France) Matthieu Ladagnous | (Germany) Robert Bengsch |
Women's Events
| U23 Women's Sprint | (Germany) Christin Muche | (France) Clara Sanchez | (Italy) Elisa Frisoni |
| U23 Women's 500 m Time Trial | (Italy) Elisa Frisoni | (France) Clara Sanchez | (Germany) Miriam Welte |
| U23 Women's Individual Pursuit | (Belarus) Tatsiana Sharakova | (Netherlands) Marlijn Binnendijk | (Switzerland) Pascale Schnider |
| U23 Women's Keirin | (Germany) Christin Muche | (France) Clara Sanchez | (Russia) Anastasia Tchulkova |
| U23 Women's Scratch | (Switzerland) Pascale Schnider | (Ukraine) Svitlana Semchuk | (Italy) Eleonora Soldo |
| U23 Women's Points Race | (Germany) Charlotte Becker | (Italy) Giorgia Bronzini | (Netherlands) Nina Köhn |

=== Juniors ===
| Event | Gold | Silver | Bronze |
|---|---|---|---|
Men's Events
| Junior Men's Sprint | (Germany) Maximilian Levy | (France) Kévin Sireau | (Germany) René Enders |
| Junior Men's 1 km Time Trial | (Germany) Maximilian Levy | (Poland) Dawid Glowacki | (Germany) David Wilken |
| Junior Men's Individual Pursuit | (Moldova) Alexandre Pliușchin | (Ukraine) Vitaliy Shchedov | (Russia) Ivan Rovny |
| Junior Men's Team Pursuit | United Kingdom; Ross Sander; Andrew Tennant; Ian Stannard; Steven Burke | Poland; Hubert Tulacz; Michal Nawrocki; Pawel Mikulicz; Jonasz Krysztofik | Russia; Andrey Klyuev; Alexey Shyryaev; Roman Maximov; Sergey Valynin |
| Junior Men's Team Sprint | France; Michaël D'Almeida; Kévin Sireau; Alexandre Volant | Poland; Rafal Poper; Dawid Glowacki; Krzysztof Szymanek | Russia; Andrey Chernopyatov; Pavel Noskov; Maxim Tarakanov |
| Junior Men's Keirin | (Germany) David Wilken | (Greece) Christos Volikakis | (Czech Republic) Denis Špička |
| Junior Men's Scratch | (United Kingdom) Matthew Rowe | (Czech Republic) Filip Hanslian | (Poland) Jonasz Krysztofik |
| Junior Men's Points Race | (Russia) Pavel Korzh | (Germany) Sebastian Forke | (Russia) Alexey Shyryaev |
Women's Events
| Junior Women's Sprint | (Ukraine) Lyubov Shulika | (Russia) Yulia Kosheleva | (France) Sandie Clair |
| Junior Women's 500 m Time Trial | (Ukraine) Lyubov Shulika | (France) Elodie Henriette | (United Kingdom) Anna Blyth |
| Junior Women's Individual Pursuit | (Ukraine) Lesya Kalitovska | (France) Pascale Jeuland | (Denmark) Trine Schmidt |
| Junior Women's Keirin | (France) Elodie Henriette | (Ukraine) Lyubov Shulika | (Russia) Anastasia Rozhkova |
| Junior Women's Scratch | (Italy) Silvia Daniele | (Russia) Evgenia Romanyuta | (France) Pascale Jeuland |
| Junior Women's Points Race | (Denmark) Mie Bekker Lacota | (France) Pascale Jeuland | (Russia) Irina Zemlyanskaya |

== Medal table ==
| Rank | Nation | Gold | Silver | Bronze | Total |
|---|---|---|---|---|---|
| 1 | Germany (GER) | 10 | 3 | 4 | 17 |
| 2 | Ukraine (UKR) | 4 | 4 | 0 | 8 |
| 3 | Russia (RUS) | 3 | 2 | 9 | 14 |
| 4 | Denmark (DEN) | 3 | 1 | 1 | 5 |
| 4 | Great Britain (GBR) | 3 | 1 | 1 | 5 |
| 6 | France (FRA) | 2 | 9 | 3 | 14 |
| 7 | Italy (ITA) | 2 | 1 | 3 | 6 |
| 8 | Poland (POL) | 1 | 3 | 1 | 5 |
| 9 | Lithuania (LTU) | 1 | 1 | 1 | 3 |
| 10 | Switzerland (SUI) | 1 | 0 | 1 | 2 |
| 11 | Belarus (BLR) | 1 | 0 | 0 | 1 |
| 11 | Moldova (MDA) | 1 | 0 | 0 | 1 |
| 13 | Czech Republic (CZE) | 0 | 3 | 3 | 6 |
| 14 | Netherlands (NED) | 0 | 2 | 4 | 6 |
| 15 | Belgium (BEL) | 0 | 1 | 0 | 1 |
| 15 | Greece (GRE) | 0 | 1 | 0 | 1 |
| 17 | Spain (ESP) | 0 | 0 | 1 | 1 |
| Totals (17 entries) | | 32 | 32 | 32 | 96 |
