= 2012 European Track Championships (under-23 & junior) =

- Venue: Anadia, Portugal
- Date: 4–9 July 2012
- Velodrome: Velódromo Nacional de Sangalhos
- Events: 38

The 2012 European Track Championships are the European Championships for track cycling. The junior and under 23 riders events took place at the Velódromo Nacional de Sangalhos in Anadia, Portugal from 4 to 9 July 2012 .

== Medal summary ==
=== Under 23 ===
Event	Gold		Silver		Bronze	
Men's Events
U23 Men's Sprint	Stefan Bötticher; Germany		Charlie Conord; France		Philipp Thiele; Spain	
U23 Men's 1 km Time Trial	Quentin Lafargue; France	1:02.077	Hugo Haak; Netherlands	1:02.447	Krzysztof Maksel; Poland	1:02.517
U23 Men's Individual Pursuit	Silvan Dillier; Switzerland	4:25.324	Albert Torres; Spain	4:27.831	Kevin Labeque; France	4:27.715
U23 Men's Team Pursuit	Matvey Zubov; Nikolay Zhurkin; Ivan Savitskiy; Viktor Manakov; Russia	4:05.273	Silvan Dillier; Cyrille Thièry; Théry Schir; Jan Keller; Switzerland	caught	Moreno De Pauw; Joris Cornet; Gijs Van Hoecke; Jasper De Buyst; Belgium	4:08.612
U23 Men's Team Sprint	Erik Balzer; Eric Engler; Stefan Bötticher; Germany	44.480	Charlie Conord; Quentin Lafargue; Julien Palma; France	45.788	Rafal Sarnecki; Grzegorz Drejgier; Krzysztof Maksel; Poland	45.005
U23 Men's Keirin	Stefan Bötticher; Germany		Krzysztof Maksel; Poland		Marc Schröder; Germany	
U23 Men's Scratch	Jan Kadúch; Czech Republic		Théry Schir; Switzerland		Barry Markus; Netherlands	
U23 Men's Points Race	Wojciech Pszczolarski; Poland	92 pts	Bryan Coquard; France	83 pts	Ivan Savitskiy; Russia	81 pts
U23 Men's Madison	Silvan Dillier; Jan Keller; Switzerland	4 pts	Gijs van Hoecke; Jasper de Buystr; Belgium	9 pts (-1 laps)	Albert Torres Barcelo; Julio Alberto Amores Palacios; Spain	14 pts (-2 laps)
U23 Men's Omnium	Viktor Manakov; Russia	18 pts	Bryan Coquard; France	20 pts	Lucas Liss; Germany	25 pts
Women's Events
U23 Women's Sprint	Viktoria Baranova; Russia		Olivia Montauban; France		Becky James; Great Britain	
U23 Women's 500 m Time Trial	Anastasiia Voinova; Russia	34.501	Elena Brezhniva; Russia	34.675	Olivia Montauban; France	34.902
U23 Women's Individual Pursuit	Amy Pieters; Netherlands	3:43.379	Lucie Záleská; Czech Republic	3:45.225	Aleksandra Chekina; Russia	3:40.502
U23 Women's Team Pursuit	Elena Lichmanova; Lidia Malakhova; Galina Streltsova; Russia	3:30.393	Jolien D'Hoore; Sarah Inghelbrecht; Gilke Croket; Belgium	3:31.799	Giulia Donato; Maria Giulia Confalonieri; Chiara Vannucci; Italy	3:31.777
U23 Women's Team Sprint	Viktoria Baranova; Anastasiia Voinova; Russia	33.678	Becky James; Victoria Williamson; Great Britain	34.687	Shanne Braspennincx; Yesna Rijkhoff; Netherlands	36.246
U23 Women's Keirin	Viktoria Baranova; Russia		Elena Brezhniva; Russia		Becky James; Great Britain	
U23 Women's Scratch	Natalia Rutkowska; Poland		Laurie Berthon; France		Katsiaryna Barazna; Belarus	
U23 Women's Points Race	Jolien D'Hoore; Belgium	37 pts	Elena Cecchini; Italy	37 pts	Maria Giulia Confalonieri; Italy	36 pts
U23 Women's Omnium	Tamara Balabolina; Russia	23 pts	Laurie Berthon; France	25 pts	Lucie Záleská; Czech Republic	29 pts

=== Junior ===
Event	Gold		Silver		Bronze	
Men's Events
Junior Men's Sprint	Richard Assmus; Germany		Matthew Rotherham; Great Britain		Jakub Vývoda; Czech Republic	
Junior Men's 1 km Time Trial	Matthew Rotherham; Great Britain	1:03.860	Alexander Dubchenko; Russia	1:03.923	Jakub Vývoda; Czech Republic	1:04.442
Junior Men's Individual Pursuit	Tom Bohli; Switzerland	3:19.515	Nils Schomber; Germany	3:20.567	Jonathan Dibben; Great Britain	3:22.702
Junior Men's Team Pursuit	Mathias Møller Nielsen; Elias Busk; Mathias Krigbaum; Jonas Poulsen; Denmark	4:12.195	Jonathan Dibben; Sam Lowe; Chris Latham; Tao Geoghegan Hart; Great Britain	4:13.816	Nils Schomber; Domenic Weinstein; Leon Rohde; Jonas Tenbrock; Germany	4:13.465
Junior Men's Team Sprint	Richard Assmus; Jan May; Maximilian Dörnbach; Germany	46.762	Alexander Sharapov; Alexander Dubchenko; Alexey Lysenko; Russia	47.295	Mateusz Lipa; Adrian Kobylecki; Jakub Stecko; Poland	46.448
Junior Men's Keirin	Mateusz Lipa; Poland		Matthew Rotherham; Great Britain		Johannes Keuchel; Germany	
Junior Men's Scratch	Francesco Castegnaro; Italy		Christopher Latham; Great Britain		Jakub Mareczko; Italy	
Junior Men's Points Race	Thomas Boudat; France	64 pts	Tom Bohli; Switzerland	51 pts	Maxime Piveteau; France	32 pts
Junior Men's Madison	Riccardo Donato; Matteo Alban; Italy	9 pts	Mathias Krigbaum; Jonas Poulsen; Denmark	9 pts	Pascal Ackermann; Domenic Weinstein; Germany	6 pts
Junior Men's Omnium	Pascal Ackermann; Germany	19 pts	Jonas Rickaert; Belgium	22 pts	Jonathan Dibben; Great Britain	26 pts
Women's Events
Junior Women's Sprint	Elis Ligtlee; Netherlands		Daria Shmeleva; Russia		Mar Manrique Villena; Spain	
Junior Women's 500 m Time Trial	Daria Shmeleva; Russia	34.763	Elis Ligtlee; Netherlands	35.723	Lidia Pluzhnikova; Russia	36.494
Junior Women's Individual Pursuit	Elinor Barker; Great Britain	2:28.189	Anna Knauer; Germany	2:28.442	Manon Bourdiaux; France	2:30.111
Junior Women's Team Pursuit	Elinor Barker; Lucy Garner; Amy Roberts; Great Britain	3:33.921	Kseniya Dobrynina; Gulnaz Badykova; Natalia Mozharova; Russia	3:34.326	Ana Maria Corvig; Arianna Fidanza; Michela Maltese; Italy	3:34.546
Junior Women's Team Sprint	Lidia Pluzhnikova; Daria Shmeleva; Russia	35.069	Lucy Garner; Dannielle Khan; Great Britain	35.904	Elis Ligtlee; Tamar Vedder; Netherlands	35.969
Junior Women's Keirin	Daria Shmeleva; Russia		Shana Dalving; Belgium		Elis Ligtlee; Netherlands	
Junior Women's Scratch	Lucy Garner; Great Britain		Iris Sachet; France		Shana Dalving; Belgium	
Junior Women's Points Race	Arianna Fidanza; Italy	34 pts	Kseniya Dobrynina; Russia	26 pts	Natasha Grillo; Italy	13 pts
Junior Women's Omnium	Anna Knauer; Germany	12 pts	Tetyana Klimchenko; Ukraine	25 pts	Michela Pavin; Italy	27 pts

== Medal table ==
Rank	Nation	Gold	Silver	Bronze	Total
1	Russia (RUS)	11	7	3	21
2	Germany (GER)	7	2	5	14
3	Great Britain (GBR)	4	6	4	14
4	Switzerland (SUI)	3	3	0	6
5	Italy (ITA)	3	1	7	11
6	Poland (POL)	3	1	3	7
7	France (FRA)	2	8	3	13
8	Netherlands (NED)	2	2	4	8
9	Belgium (BEL)	1	4	2	7
10	Czech Republic (CZE)	1	1	3	5
11	Denmark (DEN)	1	1	0	2
12	Spain (ESP)	0	1	3	4
13	Ukraine (UKR)	0	1	0	1
14	Belarus (BLR)	0	0	1	1
Totals (14 entries)		38	38	38	114
