= John Bairos =

American cyclist

Personal information
- Born: November 8, 1977 (age 48) Anaheim, California, U.S.

Sport
- Country: United States
- Sport: Cycling

John "Johnny" Bairos (born November 8, 1977) is an American cyclist. He competed at the 2000 Summer Olympics in Sydney, in the men's team sprint. Bairos was born in Anaheim, California.
