= Sergey Borisov (cyclist) =

Russian racing cyclist

Personal information
- Born: 25 January 1983 (age 43) Yasnogorksk, Russia

Cycling career
- Sport: Cycling
Medal record
Representing Russia
Men's track cycling
World Junior Championships
Silver medal – second place	2000 Fiorenzuola	Team sprint
European U23 Championships
Silver medal – second place	2003 Moscow	Team sprint
European Junior Championships
Bronze medal – third place	2001 Fiorenzuola	Sprint
Bronze medal – third place	2001 Fiorenzuola	Team sprint

Sergey Vladimirovich Borisov (born 25 January 1983) is a Russian cyclist. He competed in the keirin and the men's team sprint at the 2012 Summer Olympics in London.
