= 2002 UEC European Track Championships =

- Venue: Büttgen, Germany
- Date(s): 2002

The 2002 UEC European Track Championships were the European Championships for track cycling, for junior and under 23 riders. They took place in Büttgen, Germany.

== Medal summary ==
=== Open ===
Event	Gold	Silver	Bronze
Men's events
Men's Omnium	(Switzerland) Franco Marvulli	(Switzerland) Alexander Äschbach	(Austria) Roland Garber
Men's Sprint Omnium	(Latvia) Ainārs Ķiksis	(Czech Republic) Pavel Buráň	(Latvia) Viesturs Bērziņš
Women's events
Women's Omnium	(Russia) Olga Slyusareva	(Russia) Svetlana Ivakhonenkova	(Russia) Natalya Karimova

=== Under 23 ===
Event	Gold	Silver	Bronze
Men's Events
U23 Men's Sprint	(Poland) Łukasz Kwiatkowski	(Netherlands) Theo Bos	(Netherlands) Teun Mulder
U23 Men's 1 km Time Trial	(France) Mathieu Mandard	(Netherlands) Theo Bos	(Netherlands) Teun Mulder
U23 Men's Individual Pursuit	(Ukraine) Volodymyr Dyudya	(Russia) Roman Kononenko	(United Kingdom) Kieran Page
U23 Men's Team Sprint	Germany; Carsten Bergemann; Matthias John; Sören Lausberg	Poland; Grzegorz Krejner; Łukasz Kwiatkowski; Damian Zieliński	Czech Republic; Pavel Buráň; Arnošt Drcmánek; Ivan Vrba
U23 Men's Team Pursuit	Ukraine; Volodymyr Zagorodny; Vitaliy Popkov; Roman Kononenko; Volodymyr Dyudya	France; Vincent Socquin; Christophe Riblon; Nicolas Rousseau; Aurélien Mingot	Germany; Leif Lampater; Marc Altmann; Christian Müller; Daniel Schlegel
U23 Men's Keirin	(Netherlands) Theo Bos	(Russia) Vladimir Kiritsev	(Poland) Łukasz Kwiatkowski
U23 Men's Points Race	(Slovenia) Jure Zrimšek	(Greece) Ioánnis Tamourídis	(France) Nicolas Rousseau
U23 Men's Madison	France; Saïd Haddou; Laurent D'Olivier	Germany; Stefan Löffler; Christoph Meschenmoser	Belgium; Iljo Keisse; Wouter Van Mechelen
U23 Men's Scratch	(Netherlands) Jos Pronk	(Russia) Alexey Shmidt	(Poland) Rafał Ratajczyk
Women's Events
U23 Women's Sprint	(Russia) Tamilla Abassova	(France) Céline Nivert	(France) Clara Sanchez
U23 Women's 500 m Time Trial	(Russia) Tamilla Abassova	(France) Céline Nivert	(Netherlands) Yvonne Hijgenaar
U23 Women's Individual Pursuit	(Italy) Vera Carrara	(Netherlands) Vera Koedooder	(Lithuania) Negringa Raudonite
U23 Women's Points Race	(Netherlands) Vera Koedooder	(Italy) Giorgia Bronzini	(Russia) Yulia Aroustamova
U23 Women's Scratch	(France) Mathilde Doutreluingne	(Italy) Lisa Gatto	(Netherlands) Vera Koedooder

=== Juniors ===
Event	Gold	Silver	Bronze
Men's Events
Junior Men's Sprint	(Germany) Michael Seidenbecher	(France) François Pervis	(France) Mickaël Murat
Junior Men's 1 km Time Trial	(France) François Pervis	(Germany) Michael Seidenbecher	(France) Mickaël Murat
Junior Men's Individual Pursuit	(Russia) Nikolai Trussov	(Russia) Mikhail Ignatiev	(Ukraine) Vitaliy Kondrut
Junior Men's Team Pursuit	Ukraine; Andriy Buchko; Vadym Matsko; Vitaliy Kondrut; Dmytro Grabovskyy	Germany; Andreas Welsch; Florian Piper; Christian Kux; Robert Kriegs	Russia; Mikhail Ignatiev; Nikolai Trussov; Maksym Averin; Anton Mindlin
Junior Men's Team Sprint	Germany; Michael Spiess; Michael Seidenbecher; Robert Eichfeld	France; Kévin Corroleur; Mickaël Murat; François Pervis	Czech Republic; Filip Ditzel; Jaroslav Flendr; Daniel Lebl
Junior Men's Points Race	(Russia) Mikhail Ignatiev	(Germany) Sebastian Frey	(Netherlands) Gideon De Jong
Women's Events
Junior Women's Sprint	(Italy) Elisa Frisoni	(Ukraine) Sofiya Pryshchepa	(Russia) Ekaterina Merzlikina
Junior Women's 500 m Time Trial	(Italy) Elisa Frisoni	(Germany) Jennifer Strohschneider	(Ukraine) Sofiya Pryshchepa
Junior Women's Individual Pursuit	(Ukraine) Sofiya Pryshchepa	(Netherlands) Suzanne de Goede	(Germany) Julia Kurzke
Junior Women's Points Race	(Italy) Eleonora Soldo	(Russia) Ekaterina Merzlikina	(Greece) Kyriaki Konstantinidou

== Medal table ==
Rank	Nation	Gold	Silver	Bronze	Total
1	Russia (RUS)	5	6	4	15
2	France (FRA)	4	5	4	13
3	Italy (ITA)	4	2	0	6
4	Ukraine (UKR)	4	1	2	7
5	Germany (GER)	3	5	2	10
6	Netherlands (NED)	3	4	5	12
7	Poland (POL)	1	1	2	4
8	Switzerland (SUI)	1	1	0	2
9	Latvia (LAT)	1	0	1	2
10	Slovenia (SLO)	1	0	0	1
11	Czech Republic (CZE)	0	1	2	3
12	Greece (GRE)	0	1	1	2
13	Austria (AUT)	0	0	1	1
13	Belgium (BEL)	0	0	1	1
13	Great Britain (GBR)	0	0	1	1
13	Lithuania (LTU)	0	0	1	1
Totals (16 entries)		27	27	27	81
