= 2006 UEC European Track Championships =

- Venue: Athens, Greece
- Date: 19–23 July 2006
- Events: 29+3

The 2006 European Track Championships were the European Championships for track cycling, for junior and under 23 riders. They took place in Athens, Greece from 19 – 23 July 2006.

== Medal summary ==
=== Under 23 ===
Event	Gold		Silver		Bronze	
Men's events
Men's under-23 sprint	Maximilian Levy; Germany		Grégory Baugé; France		Michael Seidenbecher; Germany	
Men's under-23 1 km time trial	Tim Veldt; Netherlands	1:02.322	François Pervis; France	1:02.561	Maximilian Levy; Germany	1:02.802
Men's under-23 individual pursuit	Mikhail Ignatiev; Russia	4:26.453	Gediminas Bagdonas; Lithuania	4:29.299	Nikolay Trussov; Russia	
Men's under-23 team pursuit	Edward Clancy; Ian Stannard; Andy Tennant; Geraint Thomas; Great Britain	4:05.199	Alexander Khatuntsev; Sergey Kolesnikov; Ivan Kovalev; Valery Valynin; Russia	4:08.522	Gediminas Bagdonas; Simas Kondrotas; Ignatas Konovalovas; Aidis Kruopis; Lithuania	4:08.626
Men's under-23 team sprint	René Enders; Maximilian Levy; Michael Seidenbecher; Germany	44.909	Grégory Baugé; Didier Henriette; François Pervis; France	45.315	Denis Dmitriev; Mikhail Shikalev; Stoyan Vasev; Russia	45.683
Men's under-23 keirin	Mikhail Shikhalev; Russia		Maximilian Levy; Germany		Michael Seidenbecher; Germany	
Men's under-23 scratch race	Wim Stroetinga; Netherlands		Geraint Thomas; Great Britain		Ivan Kovalev; Russia	
Men's under-23 points race	Ivan Rovny; Russia	54 points	Niki Terpstra; Netherlands	40 points	Michael Mørkøv; Denmark	37 points
Women's events
Women's under-23 sprint	Jane Gerisch; Germany		Anastasia Chulkova; Russia		Miriam Welte; Germany	
Women's under-23 500 m time trial	Miriam Welte; Germany	35.041	Magdalena Sara; Poland	35.936	Jane Gerisch; Germany	36.104
Women's under-23 individual pursuit	Tatsiana Sharakova; Belarus	3:42,468	Pascale Schnider; Switzerland	3:47,081	Tatiana Guderzo; Italy	
Women's under-23 keirin	Jane Gerisch; Germany		Annalisa Cuccinotta; Italy		Magdalena Sara; Poland	
Women's under-23 scratch race	Monia Baccaille; Italy		Alena Prudnikova; Russia		Tatsiana Sharakova; Belarus	
Women's under-23 points race	Marlyn Binnendyk; Netherlands	36 points	Irina Zemlyanskaya; Russia	30 points	Jarmila Machačová; Czech Republic	26 points
Women's omnium	Lada Kozlíková; Czech Republic	40 points	Yulia Arustamova; Russia	35 points	Carolina Lüthi; Switzerland	33 points

=== Juniors ===
Event	Gold		Silver		Bronze	
Men's Events
Junior Men's Sprint	Jason Kenny; Great Britain		Hodei Mazquiarán Uría; Spain		Christian Lyte; Great Britain	
Junior Men's 1 km Time Trial	David Daniell; Great Britain	1:04.451	Jason Kenny; Great Britain	1:04.713	Hodei Mazquiarán Uría; Spain	1:04.996
Junior Men's Individual Pursuit	Marco Coledan; Italy	3:24.424	Evgeny Kovalev; Russia	3:24.458	Alexandre Lemair; France	3:24.852
Junior Men's Team Pursuit	Jonathan Bellis; Adam Blythe; Steven Burke; Peter Kennaugh; Alex Dowsett; Great Britain	4:15.619	Vivien Brisse; Vincent Dauga; Alexandre Lemair; Bryan Nauleau; France	4:17.202	Mikhail Baryshnikov; Nikita Novikov; Alexander Rybakov; Stanislav Volkov; Russia	4:21.975
Junior Men's Team Sprint	David Daniell; Jason Kenny; Christian Lyte; Great Britain	46.506	Vasileios Reppas; Christos Volikakis; Zafeiris Volikakis; Greece	47.274	Konrad Dąbkowski; Pawel Sarnecki; Adrian Tekliński; Poland	47.595
Junior Men's Keirin	Jason Kenny; Great Britain		Vladimir Khozov; Russia		Denis Špička; Czech Republic	
Junior Men's Scratch	Elia Viviani; Italy		Vincent Dauga; France		Gerrit Peetoom; Netherlands	
Junior Men's Points Race	Maxim Pokidov; Russia	30 points	Oleksandr Martynenko; Ukraine	30 points	Salvador Guardiola Tora; Spain	24 points
Women's Events
Junior Women's Sprint	Lyubov Shulika; Ukraine		Virginie Cueff; France		Anna Blyth; Great Britain	
Junior Women's 500 m Time Trial	Lyubov Shulika; Ukraine	34.741	Sandie Clair; France	34.789	Virginie Cueff; France	35.637
Junior Women's Individual Pursuit	Lesya Kalytovska; Ukraine	2:25.557	Elise van Hage; Netherlands	2:35.289	Yulia Popova; Russia	2:30.579
Junior Women's Keirin	Lyubov Shulika; Ukraine		Renata Dąbrowska; Poland		Sandie Clair; France	
Junior Women's Scratch	Elise van Hage; Netherlands		Virginie Cueff; France		Evgenia Romanyuta; Russia	
Junior Women's Points Race	Elise van Hage; Netherlands	16 points	Evgenia Romanyuta; Russia	11 points	Silvia Castoldi; Italy	11 points

== Open ==
=== Omnium ===
Année	Gold	Silver	Bronze
2006	NED Jens Mouris	POL Rafał Ratajczyk	SUI Franco Marvulli
2006	CZE Lada Kozlíková	RUS Yulia Aroustamova	SUI Carolina Lüthi

=== Omnium sprint ===
Année	Gold	Silver	Bronze
2006	NED Tim Veldt	POL Damian Zieliński	DEN Kasper Lindholm Jessen

== Medal table ==
Rank	Nation	Gold	Silver	Bronze	Total
1	Netherlands (NED)	7	2	1	10
2	Great Britain (GBR)	6	2	2	10
3	Germany (GER)	5	1	6	12
4	Russia (RUS)	4	10	6	20
5	Ukraine (UKR)	4	0	0	4
6	Italy (ITA)	3	1	2	6
7	Czech Republic (CZE)	1	0	2	3
8	Belarus (BLR)	1	0	1	2
9	Belgium (BEL)	1	0	0	1
10	France (FRA)	0	8	3	11
11	Poland (POL)	0	4	2	6
12	Spain (ESP)	0	1	2	3
12	Switzerland (SUI)	0	1	2	3
14	Lithuania (LTU)	0	1	1	2
15	Greece (GRE)	0	1	0	1
16	Denmark (DEN)	0	0	2	2
Totals (16 entries)		32	32	32	96
