= 2011 European Track Championships (under-23 & junior) =

- 2011 European Track Championships (under-23 & junior) logo
- Venue: Anadia, Portugal
- Date: 26–31 July 2011
- Velodrome: Velódromo Nacional de Sangalhos
- Events: 38

The 2011 European Track Championships were the European Championships for track cycling. The junior and under 23 riders events took place at the Velódromo Nacional de Sangalhos in Anadia, Portugal from 26 to 31 July 2011.

== Medal summary ==
=== Under 23 ===
Event	Gold		Silver		Bronze	
Men's events
Men's under-23 sprint	Stefan Bötticher; Germany		Charlie Conord; France		Callum Skinner; Great Britain	
Men's under-23 1 km time trial	Quentin Lafargue; France	1:02.142	Joachim Eilers; Germany	1:02.573	Eric Engler; Germany	1:03.197
Men's under-23 individual pursuit	Artur Ershov; Russia	4:26.276	Sergey Chernetskiy; Russia	caught	Albert Torres; Spain	4:31.544
Men's under-23 team pursuit	Sergey Chernetskiy; Artur Ershov; Maxim Kozyrev; Kirill Sveshnikov; Russia	4:05.120	Mark Christian; Samuel Harrison; Joseph Kelly; Erick Rowsell; Great Britain	4:08.445	Olivier Beer; Silvan Dillier; Jan Keller; Cyrille Thièry; Switzerland	4:07.613
Men's under-23 team sprint	Erik Balzer; Stefan Bötticher; Joachim Eilers; Germany	44.477	Philip Hindes; Peter Mitchell; Callum Skinner; Great Britain	44.930	Aleksey Tkachev; Vadim Berbenyuk; Denis Shurshin; Russia	44.790
Men's under-23 keirin	Stefan Bötticher; Germany		Joachim Eilers; Germany		Marc Schroder; Germany	
Men's under-23 scratch race	Davide Cimolai; Italy		Luke Rowe; Great Britain		Viktor Shmalko; Russia	
Men's under-23 points race	Elia Viviani; Italy	54 pts	Nick Stöpler; Netherlands	42 pts	Jonathan Mould; Great Britain	38 pts
U23 Men's Madison	Silvan Dillier; Cyrille Thièry; Switzerland	5 pts	Elia Viviani; Davide Cimolai; Italy	16 pts (-1 lap)	Yoeri Havik; Nick Stöpler; Netherlands	14 pts (-1 lap)
U23 Men's Omnium	Elia Viviani; Italy	25 pts	Roy Eefting; Netherlands	27 pts	Moreno De Pauw; Belgium	31 pts
Women's events
Women's under-23 sprint	Victoria Baranova; Russia		Olivia Montauban; France		Jessica Varnish; Great Britain	
Women's under-23 500 m time trial	Jessica Varnish; Great Britain	34.596	Becky James; Great Britain	35.017	Victoria Baranova; Russia	35.038
Women's under-23 individual pursuit	Laura Trott; Great Britain	3:34.186	Katarzyna Pawłowska; Poland	caught	Eugenia Bujak; Poland	3:45.057
Women's under-23 team pursuit	Katie Colclough; Dani King; Laura Trott; Great Britain	3:22.222	Eugenia Bujak; Katarzyna Pawłowska; Małgorzata Wojtyra; Poland	caught	Alexandra Goncharova; Elena Lichmanova; Lidiya Malakhova; Russia	3:33.307
Women's under-23 team sprint	Becky James; Jessica Varnish; Great Britain	33.912	Elena Brezhniva; Ekaterina Gnidenko; Russia	34.341	Małgorzata Wojtyra; Natalia Rutkowska; Poland	35.252
Women's under-23 keirin	Victoria Baranova; Russia		Olivia Montauban; France		Ekaterina Gnidenko; Russia	
Women's under-23 scratch race	Laura Trott; Great Britain		Małgorzata Wojtyra; Poland		Shannon McCurley; Ireland	
Women's under-23 points race	Valentina Scandolara; Italy	40 pts	Katie Colclough; Great Britain	30 pts	Katarzyna Pawłowska; Poland	29 pts
U23 Women's Omnium	Małgorzata Wojtyra; Poland	15 pts	Dani King; Great Britain	16 pts	Laura van der Kamp; Netherlands	31 pts

=== Junior ===
Event	Gold		Silver		Bronze	
Men's events
Junior Men's Sprint	John Paul; Great Britain		Nikita Shurshin; Russia		Max Niederlag; Germany	
Junior Men's 1 km Time Trial	Benjamin Edelin; France	1:03.867	José Moreno Sánchez; Spain	1:04.993	Benjamin Konig; Germany	1:05.008
Junior Men's Individual Pursuit	Jonathan Dibben; Great Britain	3:19.018	Owain Doull; Great Britain	3:24.223	Kévin Lesellier; France	3:22.363
Junior Men's Team Pursuit	Jonathan Dibben; Owain Doull; Samuel Lowe; Joshua Papworth; Great Britain	4:11.762	Royan Iulev; Aleksey Ryabkin; Andrey Sazanov; Eugeny Zateshilov; Russia	4:19.240	Thomas Boudat; Marc Fournier; Kévin Lesellier; Maxime Piveteau; France	4:12.641
Junior Men's Team Sprint	Benjamin Edelin; Anthony Jacques; Julien Palma; France	46.256	Max Niederlag; Benjamin Konig; Pascal Ackermann; Germany	46.452	Alexander Sharapov; Nikita Shurshin; Victor Nenastin; Russia	46.723
Junior Men's Keirin	John Paul; Great Britain		Max Niederlag; Germany		Julien Palma; France	
Junior Men's Scratch	Yoan Verardo; France		Marc Sarreau; France		Samuel Lowe; Great Britain	
Junior Men's Points Race	Julio Amores; Spain	37 pts	Théry Schir; Switzerland	34 pts	Joshua Papworth; Great Britain	33 pts
Junior Men's Madison	Stefan Küng; Théry Schir; Switzerland	13 pts	Jan Kraus; František Sisr; Czech Republic	11 pts	Jonas Rickaert; Otto Vergaerde; Belgium	9 pts
Junior Men's Omnium	Ahmet Örken; Turkey	22 pts	Jasper De Buyst; Belgium	22 pts	Owain Doull; Great Britain	28 pts
Women's events
Junior Women's Sprint	Anastasia Voynova; Russia		Victoria Williamson; Great Britain		Tamara Balabolina; Russia	
Junior Women's 500 m Time Trial	Anastasia Voynova; Russia	35.245	Victoria Williamson; Great Britain	36.185	Elis Ligtlee; Netherlands	36.213
Junior Women's Individual Pursuit	Alexandra Chekina; Russia	2:28.001	Elinor Barker; Great Britain	2:30.787	Beatrice Bartelloni; Italy	2:32.297
Junior Women's Team Pursuit	Beatrice Bartelloni; Maria Giulia Confalonieri; Chiara Vannucci; Italy	3:32.887	Alexandra Chekina; Gulnaz Badykova; Svetlana Kashirina; Russia	3:36.998	Eugénie Duval; Eloïse Bec; Valentine Mori; France	3:33.679
Junior Women's Team Sprint	Anastasia Voynova; Tamara Balabolina; Russia	35.497	Victoria Williamson; Jessica Crampton; Great Britain	35.720	Dominika Borkowska; Urszula Los; Poland	36.668
Junior Women's Keirin	Anastasia Voynova; Russia		Stella Tomassini; Italy		Lisa Gamba; Italy	
Junior Women's Scratch	Giulia Donato; Italy		Gabriela Slamova; Czech Republic		Roxane Fournier; France	
Junior Women's Points Race	Maria Giulia Confalonieri; Italy	22 pts	Svetlana Kashirina; Russia	17 pts	Kelly Markus; Netherlands	13 pts
Junior Women's Omnium	Chiara Vannucci; Italy	20 pts	Alina Bondarenko; Russia	20 pts	Laudine Genée; France	24 pts

== Medal table ==
Rank	Nation	Gold	Silver	Bronze	Total
1	GBR	9	10	6	25
2	RUS	9	8	7	24
3	ITA	7	2	2	11
4	FRA	4	4	5	13
5	GER	3	5	4	12
6	ESP	2	1	1	4
6	SUI	2	1	1	4
8	POL	1	3	4	8
9	TUR	1	0	0	1
10	NED	0	2	5	7
11	BEL	0	1	2	3
12	CZE	0	1	0	1
13	IRL	0	0	1	1
Totals (13 entries)		38	38	38	114
