= 2007 UEC European Track Championships =

- Venue: Cottbus, Germany
- Date(s): 11–15 July 2007
- Events: 30+3

The 2007 European Track Championships were the European Championships for track cycling, for junior and under 23 riders. They took place in Cottbus, Germany from 11 – 15 July 2007.

== Open ==
=== Omnium ===
Année	Gold	Silver	Bronze
2007	ESP Unai Elorriaga	NED Rafał Ratajczyk	FRA Jens Mouris
2007	ITA Vera Carrara	ESP Gema Pascual Torrecilla	GER Elke Gebhardt

=== Omnium sprint ===
Année	Gold	Silver	Bronze
2007	NED Teun Mulder	FRA François Pervis	FRA Arnaud Tournant

=== Under 23 ===
Event	Gold		Silver		Bronze	
Men's Events
Men's under-23 sprint	Grégory Baugé; France		Kévin Sireau; France		Jason Kenny; Great Britain	
Men's under-23 1 km time trial	Didier Henriette; France	1:04.157	Michaël D'Almeida; France	1:04.434	Maximilian Levy; Germany	1:04.773
Men's under-23 individual pursuit	Dominique Cornu; Belgium		Alexandre Pliușchin; Moldova		Steven Burke; Great Britain	
Men's under-23 team pursuit	Peter Kennaugh; Ben Swift; Jonny Bellis; Steven Burke; Great Britain	4:12.890	Alexy Bauer; Ivan Kovalev; Nikolay Trusov; Alexey Usov; Russia	4:18.946	Ismaël Kip; Pim Ligthart; Wim Stroetinga; Sipke Zylstra; Netherlands	4:19.250
Men's under-23 team sprint	Grégory Baugé; Michaël D'Almeida; Didier Henriette; France		Maciej Bielecki; Kamil Kuczyński; Tomasz Schmidt; Poland		Matthew Crampton; Jason Kenny; Christian Lyte; Great Britain	
Men's under-23 keirin	Kévin Sireau; France		Matthew Crampton; Great Britain		Grégory Baugé; France	
Men's under-23 scratch race	Jonathan Bellis; Great Britain		Roger Kluge; Germany		Ivan Kovalev; Russia	
Men's under-23 points race	Kenny De Ketele; Belgium		Pim Ligthart; Netherlands		Nikolay Trusov; Russia	
Women's Events
Women's under-23 sprint	Lyubov Shulika; Ukraine		Miriam Welte; Germany		Jane Gerisch; Germany	
Women's under-23 500 m time trial	Sandie Clair; France	35.120	Miriam Welte; Germany	35.280	Virginie Cueff; France	35.410
Women's under-23 individual pursuit	Lesya Kalytovska; Ukraine		Svitlana Halyuk; Ukraine		Vilija Sereikaitė; Lithuania	
Women's under-23 keirin	Anna Blyth; Great Britain		Jane Gerisch; Germany		Lyubov Shulika; Ukraine	
Women's under-23 scratch race	Elizabeth Armitstead; Great Britain		Annalisa Cucinotta; Italy		Jarmila Machačová; Czech Republic	
Women's under-23 points race	Marlijn Binnendijk; Netherlands	19	Elizabeth Armitstead; Great Britain	17	Anastasia Chulkova; Russia	15

=== Juniors ===
Event	Gold		Silver		Bronze	
Men's Events
Junior Men's Sprint	David Daniell; Great Britain		Paul Kanzler; Germany		Kiri Fi Latov; Russia	
Junior Men's 1 km Time Trial	Daniel Rackwitz; Germany		David Alonso Castillo; Spain		Konrad Dąbkowski; Poland	
Junior Men's Individual Pursuit	Artur Ershov; Russia		Jérôme Cousin; France		Albert Torres Barcelo; Spain	
Junior Men's Team Pursuit	Adam Blythe; Peter Kennaugh; Mark McNally; Luke Rowe; Great Britain	4.27.033	Remi Badoc; Jérôme Cousin; Julien Duval; Nicolas Giulia; France	4.30.021	Kiril Baranov; Evgeny Kovalev; Nikita Novikov; Alexander Petrovskiy; Russia	4.26.610
Junior Men's Team Sprint	Charlie Conord; Thierry Jollet; Quentin Lafargue; France	1.03.191	Tom Buck; David Daniell; Christian Lyte; Great Britain	1.03.640	Gregor Fischer; Paul Kanzler; Daniel Rackwitz; Germany	1.03.543
Junior Men's Keirin	Andrea Guardini; Italy		Christian Lyte; Great Britain		David Daniell; Great Britain	
Junior Men's Scratch	Michael Vingerling; Netherlands		Peter Kennaugh; Great Britain		Roy Pieters; Netherlands	
Junior Men's Madison	Bastian Faltin; Ralf Matzka; Germany	18	Evgeny Kovalev; Alexander Petrovskiy; Russia	14	Tomas Alberio; Elia Viviani; Italy	9
Junior Men's Points Race	Elia Viviani; Italy		Ralf Matzka; Germany		Remi Badoc; France	
Women's Events
Junior Women's Sprint	Kristina Vogel; Germany		Viktoria Baranova; Russia		Sabine Bretschneider; Germany	
Junior Women's 500 m Time Trial	Kristina Vogel; Germany		Jessica Varnish; Great Britain		Viktoria Baranova; Russia	
Junior Women's Individual Pursuit	Fiona Dutriaux; France		Hannah Mayho; Great Britain		Elizaveta Asseserova; Russia	
Junior Women's Keirin	Jessica Varnish; Great Britain		Renata Dąbrowska; Poland		Kristina Vogel; Germany	
Junior Women's Scratch	Renata Dąbrowska; Poland		Barbara Guarischi; Italy		Elizaveta Asseserova; Russia	
Junior Women's Points Race	Alex Greenfield; Great Britain		Elizaveta Asseserova; Russia		Marta Tagliaferro; Italy	

== Medal table ==
Rank	Nation	Gold	Silver	Bronze	Total
1	Great Britain (GBR)	8	7	4	19
2	France (FRA)	7	5	5	17
3	Germany (GER)	5	6	6	17
4	Netherlands (NED)	3	3	1	7
5	Italy (ITA)	3	2	2	7
6	Ukraine (UKR)	2	1	1	4
7	Belgium (BEL)	2	0	1	3
8	Russia (RUS)	1	4	8	13
9	Poland (POL)	1	2	1	4
9	Spain (ESP)	1	2	1	4
11	Moldova (MDA)	0	1	0	1
12	Czech Republic (CZE)	0	0	1	1
12	Lithuania (LTU)	0	0	1	1
12	Switzerland (SUI)	0	0	1	1
Totals (14 entries)		33	33	33	99

== See also ==
- 2007 in track cycling
