= 2004 UEC European Track Championships =

- Venue: Valencia, Spain
- Events: 29+3

The 2004 European Track Championships were the European Championships for track cycling, for junior and under 23 riders. They took place in Valencia, Spain.

== Medal summary ==
=== Under 23 ===
Event	Gold		Silver		Bronze	
Men's Events
U23 Men's Sprint	Ross Edgar; Great Britain		Michael Seidenbecher; Germany		Łukasz Kwiatkowski; Poland	
U23 Men's 1 km Time Trial	François Pervis; France	1:03.473	Jérôme Hubschwerlin; Czech Republic	1:04.105	Michael Seidenbecher; Germany	1:04.236
U23 Men's Individual Pursuit	Volodymyr Dyudya; Ukraine		Alexander Serov; Russia		Levi Heimans; Netherlands	
U23 Men's Team Pursuit	Ukraine		Netherlands		Russia	
U23 Men's Team Sprint	France		Germany		Poland	
U23 Men's Keirin	Andriy Vynokurov; Ukraine		Franck Durivaux; France		Michael Seidenbecher; Germany	
U23 Men's Scratch	Alex Rasmussen; Denmark		Rafał Ratajczyk; Poland		Matthieu Ladagnous; France	
U23 Men's Points Race	Rafał Ratajczyk; Poland		Stefan Löffler; Germany		Gregory Devaud; Switzerland	
Men's omnium	Alexey Markov; Russia	49 points	Angelo Ciccone; Italy	39 points	Petr Lazar; Czech Republic	34 points
Men's Sprinters Omnium	Damian Zieliński; Poland	43 points	Grzegorz Krejner; Poland	43 points	Pavel Buráň; Czech Republic	42 points
Women's Events
U23 Women's Sprint	Tamila Abassova; Russia		Clara Sanchez; France		Elisa Frisoni; Italy	
U23 Women's 500 m Time Trial	Tamila Abassova; Russia	35.274	Elisa Frisoni; Italy	35.542	Clara Sanchez; France	36.207
U23 Women's Individual Pursuit	Oxana Kostenko; Russia		Tatsiana Sharakova; Belarus		Vera Koedooder; Netherlands	
U23 Women's Keirin	Clara Sanchez; France		Christine Muche; Germany		Ekaterina Merzlikina; Russia	
U23 Women's Scratch	Eleonora Soldo; Italy		Julia Arustamova; Russia		Kyriaki Kostantinidou; Greece	
U23 Women's Points Race	Charlotte Becker; Germany	25 points	Debora Galvez; Spain	23 points	Tatsiana Sharakova; Belarus	17 points
Women's omnium	Lyudmyla Vypyraylo; Ukraine	60 points	Apolinaria Bakova; Russia	40 points	Eleonora Soldo; Italy	39 points

=== Junior ===
Event	Gold		Silver		Bronze	
Men's Events
Junior Men's Sprint	Matthew Crampton; Great Britain		Matthias Stumpf; Germany		Pawel Kosciecha; Poland	
Junior Men's 1 km Time Trial	Stoyan Vasev; Russia	1:06.412	David Wilken; Germany	1:07.991	Francesco Kanda; Italy	1:08.421
Junior Men's Individual Pursuit	Vitaliy Schedov; Ukraine		Ivan Kovalev; Russia		Michael Arends; Germany	
Junior Men's Team Pursuit	Russia		Poland		Spain	
Junior Men's Team Sprint	Russia		Poland		Spain	
Junior Men's Keirin	Matthew Crampton; Great Britain		Francesco Kanda; Italy		Mikhail Shikhalev; Russia	
Junior Men's Scratch	Alexey Bauer; Russia		Kim Marius Nielsen; Denmark		Alain Lauener; Switzerland	
Junior Men's Points Race	Pavel Korzh; Russia	18 pts	Geraint Thomas; Great Britain	14 pts	Tim Mertens; Belgium	13 pts
Junior Men's Madison	Jordan Levasseur; Corentin Ermenault; France	18 pts	Vladislav Kreminskyy; Roman Gladish; Ukraine	14 pts	Clement Barbeau; Lucas Destang; France	14 pts
Women's Events
Junior Women's Sprint	Magdalena Sara; Poland		Annalisa Cucinotta; Italy		Natalia Prokurorova; Russia	
Junior Women's 500 m Time Trial	Magdalena Sara; Poland	36.674	Annalisa Cucinotta; Italy	36.999	Valeriya Velichko; Ukraine	37.217
Junior Women's Individual Pursuit	Liesbeth Bakker; Netherlands		Rebecca Bertolo; Italy		Daiva Tušlaitė; Lithuania	
Junior Women's Keirin	Magdalena Sara; Poland		Natalia Prokurorova; Russia		Joukje Braam; Netherlands	
Junior Women's Scratch	Annalisa Cucinotta; Italy		Karen Verbeek; Belgium		Rebecca Bertolo; Italy	
Junior Women's Points Race	Rebecca Bertolo; Italy	33 pts	Mie Bekker Lacota; Denmark	32 pts	Liesbeth Bakker; Netherlands	30 pts

== Medal table ==
Rank	Nation	Gold	Silver	Bronze	Total
1	Russia (RUS)	8	6	4	18
2	Ukraine (UKR)	6	0	1	7
3	Poland (POL)	5	4	2	11
4	Italy (ITA)	3	6	5	14
5	France (FRA)	3	2	2	7
6	Great Britain (GBR)	3	1	0	4
7	Germany (GER)	1	5	4	10
8	Denmark (DEN)	1	3	0	4
9	Netherlands (NED)	1	1	4	6
10	Belgium (BEL)	1	1	1	3
11	Czech Republic (CZE)	0	1	2	3
11	Spain (ESP)	0	1	2	3
13	Belarus (BLR)	0	1	1	2
14	Switzerland (SUI)	0	0	2	2
15	Greece (GRE)	0	0	1	1
15	Lithuania (LTU)	0	0	1	1
Totals (16 entries)		32	32	32	96
