= Dawid Głowacki =

Polish cyclist

Dawid Glowacki
Personal information
- Born: 18 March 1987 (age 39)

Cycling career
- Sport: Cycling
- Discipline: Track cycling
- Role: Rider
- Rider type: endurance

Dawid Glowacki (born 18 March 1987) is a Polish male track cyclist, riding for the national team. He competed in the team pursuit and madison event at the 2010 UCI Track Cycling World Championships.
