= 2013 UEC European Track Championships =

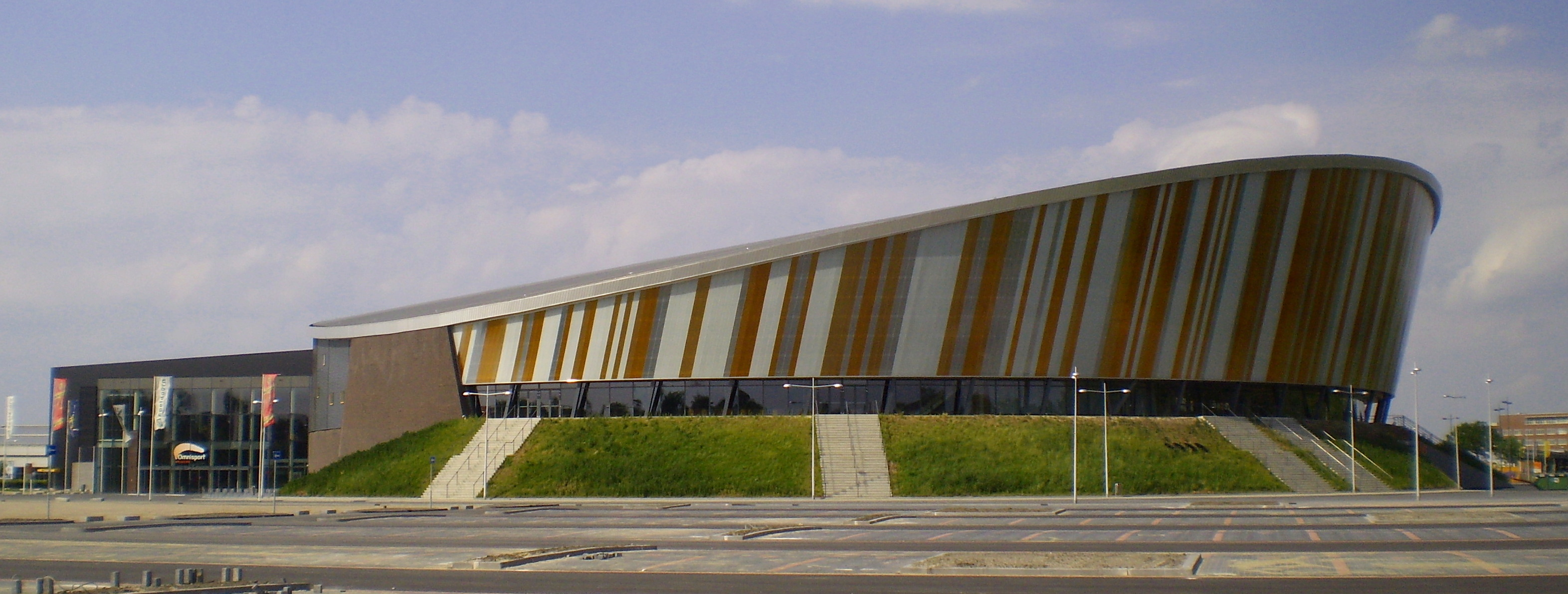
- Venue: Apeldoorn, Netherlands
- Date: 18–20 October 2013
- Velodrome: Omnisport Apeldoorn

The 2013 UEC European Track Championships was the fourth edition of the elite UEC European Track Championships in track cycling and took place at the Omnisport Arena in Apeldoorn, Netherlands, between 18 and 20 October. The Event was organised by the European Cycling Union.

All ten Olympic events, (sprint, team sprint, keirin, team pursuit and omnium, for both men and women) and the non-Olympic men's madison championship and points races for both genders were held as part of the championships.

A highly competitive championships, gold medals were share among five teams, and medals among ten teams, with Germany leading the medal table with three gold and three silver medals. Great Britain won the most medals with eight, three of them also gold, the same number as Russia. The host Netherlands also enjoyed a highly successful event, with two gold medals and six in all, by far their strongest showing at this level. Ireland also won its first ever medal at this level, a bronze in the men's omnium for world scratch race champion Martyn Irvine.

Individually Laura Trott of Great Britain, Maximilian Levy of Germany and Elia Viviani each won two gold medals, while Kristina Vogel won three medals, including gold in the women's sprint. Trott was also part of the Great Britain women's team pursuit quartet who twice lowered the world record in their event.

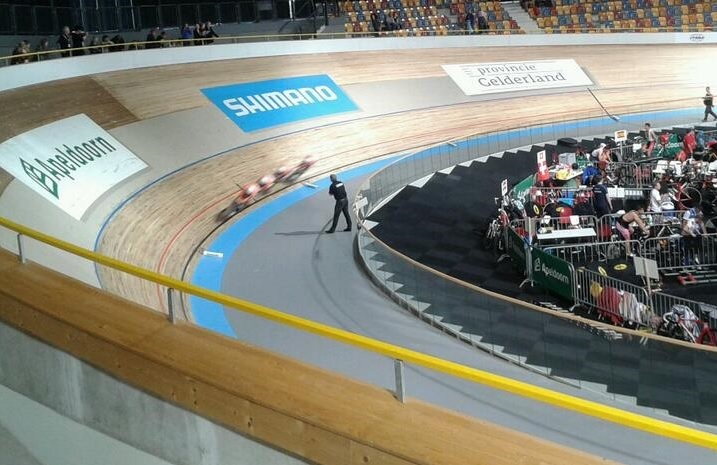
The Dutch team won bronze in the men's team pursuit.

== Events ==
Event	Gold		Silver		Bronze	
Men's events
Sprint	Denis Dmitriev; Russia		Robert Förstemann; Germany		Jason Kenny; Great Britain	
Team sprint	Germany; René Enders; Robert Förstemann; Maximilian Levy	43.636	France; Grégory Baugé; Michaël D'Almeida; François Pervis	43.902	Russia; Denis Dmitriev; Andrey Kubeev; Pavel Yakushevskiy	44.537
Keirin	Maximilian Levy; Germany		Jason Kenny; Great Britain		François Pervis; France	
Omnium	Viktor Manakov; Russia	14 pt	Tim Veldt; Netherlands (NED)	29 pt	Martyn Irvine; Ireland	40 pt
Team pursuit	Great Britain; Owain Doull; Steven Burke; Ed Clancy; Andy Tennant; Sam Harrison (q)	4:02.258	Russia; Artur Ershov; Ivan Kovalev; Evgeny Kovalev; Alexander Serov	4:02.460	(Netherlands) Netherlands; Tim Veldt; Dion Beukeboom; Roy Eefting; Jenning Huizenga	4:04.993
Points race non-Olympic	Elia Viviani; Italy	76 pt	Thomas Boudat; France	64 pt	Eloy Teruel; Spain	51 pt
Madison non-Olympic	Italy; Elia Viviani; Liam Bertazzo		Spain; David Muntaner; Albert Torres		Belgium; Kenny De Ketele; Gijs Van Hoecke	
Women's events
Sprint	Kristina Vogel; Germany		Elis Ligtlee; Netherlands (NED)		Jessica Varnish; Great Britain	
Team sprint	Russia; Yelena Brezhniva; Olga Stretsova	33.563	Germany; Kristina Vogel; Miriam Welte	33.598	Great Britain; Jessica Varnish; Becky James	33.771
Keirin	Elis Ligtlee; Netherlands (NED)		Kristina Vogel; Germany		Virginie Cueff; France	
Omnium	Laura Trott; Great Britain	15 pt	Kirsten Wild; Netherlands (NED)	15 pt	Jolien D'Hoore; Belgium	18 pt
Team pursuit	Great Britain; Laura Trott; Joanna Rowsell (q); Dani King; Elinor Barker; Katie Archibald	4:26.453 WR	Poland; Katarzyna Pawłowska; Eugenia Bujak; Małgorzata Wojtyra; Edyta Jasińska	4:35.957	Russia; Aleksandra Chekina; Evgenia Romanyuta; Gulnaz Badykova; Maria Mishina	4:34.491
Points race non-Olympic	Kirsten Wild; Netherlands (NED)	15 pt	Dani King; Great Britain	14 pt	Leire Olaberria; Spain	13 pt

- q = rode in qualification round only.
- w = won on countback
- shaded events are non-Olympic

== Medal table ==
* Host nation (Netherlands)

Rank	Nation	Gold	Silver	Bronze	Total
1	Germany	3	3	0	6
2	Great Britain	3	2	3	8
3	Russia	3	1	2	6
4	Netherlands*	2	3	1	6
5	Italy	2	0	0	2
6	France	0	2	2	4
7	Spain	0	1	2	3
8	Poland	0	1	0	1
9	Belgium	0	0	2	2
10	Ireland	0	0	1	1
Totals (10 entries)		13	13	13	39

== Participating nations ==
24 nations participated.

- Austria (3)
- Belarus (13)
- Belgium (12)
- Bulgaria (4)
- Czech Republic (13)
- Denmark (6)
- Estonia (1)
- Finland (4)
- France (17)
- Georgia (1)
- Germany (18)
- Great Britain (18)
- Greece (4)
- Hungary (2)
- Ireland (3)
- Italy (13)
- Lithuania (9)
- Netherlands (19) (See: Netherlands at the 2013 European Track Championships)
- Poland (18)
- Russia (23)
- Slovakia (1)
- Spain (13)
- Switzerland (7)
- Ukraine (20)
