= Fabian Schaar =

German cyclist (born 1989)

Personal information
- Full name: Fabian Schaar
- Born: 13 March 1989 (age 37) Hoyerswerda, Bezirk Cottbus, East Germany

Cycling career
- Sport: Cycling
- Disciplines: Road and track
- Role: Rider
- Rider type: Endurance

Fabian Schaar (born 13 March 1989) is a German track and road racing cyclist.

Schaar won the German youth championship in the team pursuit in 2005. In 2006, Schaar won a stage of the Course de la Paix and got German youth Champion both in the single and in the team pursuit. In 2007, he again won a stage of the Course de la Paix and achieved the 3rd place in the overall ranking. Schaar joined Team Ista for the 2008 season. In 2009, after team Ista was closed, he joined the Swiss Team cycling sports. As of 2010, Schaar is a member of the Continental Team Heizomat Mapei. From 2009, Schaar participated in several rounds of the UCI Track Cycling World Cup Classics (3rd place Madison, Melbourne) and attended three professional sixdays (best result: 3rd place, Tilburg with Leif Lampater).
