= 2001 UEC European Track Championships =

2001 European Championships for track cycling

- Venue: U23 – Czech Republic, Brno; Junior – Fiorenzuola, Italy
- Events: 22+3

The 2001 European Track Championships were the European Championships for track cycling, for junior and under 23 riders. The under 23 events took place in Czech Republic, Brno, and the junior in Fiorenzuola, Italy.

== Medal summary ==
=== Under 23 ===
Event	Gold		Silver		Bronze	
Men's Events
U23 Men's Sprint	Andriy Vynokurov; Ukraine		Josef Vilanueva Trinidad; Spain		Łukasz Kwiatkowski; Poland	
U23 Men's 1 km Time Trial	Hervé Gané; France	1:04.47	Jérôme Hubschwerlin; France	1:05.14	Teun Mulder; Netherlands	1:05.95
U23 Men's Individual Pursuit	Bradley Wiggins; Great Britain	4:43.21	Sergeius Apionkinas; Lithuania	4:47.16	Tomas Vaitkus; LTU	4:41.65
U23 Men's Team Pursuit	L. Hlavac; J. Kankovsky; M. Kesl; S. Kozubek; Czech Republic	4:24.440	S. Apionkinas; A. Baranauskas; T. Vaitkus; V. Kaupas; Lithuania	4:26.550	A. Ptchelkin; I. Terenin; M. Mikheev; V. Intoukine; Russia	4:27.460
U23 Men's Team Sprint	Carsten Bergemann; Mathias John; Stefan Nimke; Germany	1:16.41	Grzegorz Krejner; Łukasz Kwiatkowski; Marcin MientkiPoland	1:16.44	Dimitris Georgalis; Kleanthis Bargas; Lampros Vasilopoulos; Greece	1:16.67
U23 Men's Keirin	Andriy Vynokurov; Ukraine		Josef Vilanueva Trinidad; Spain		Teun Mulder; Netherlands	
U23 Men's Points Race	David Garbelli; Italy	45 points	Stanislav Kozubek; Czech Republic	22 points	Grymon Kurdiynowski; Poland	13 points
Open Men's Omnium	Franco Marvulli; Switzerland	41 points	Alexander Äschbach; Switzerland	36 points	Franz Stocher; Austria	32 points
U23 Men's Omnium	Mathieu Ladagnous/Fabien Patanchon; France	points	Alexey Shmidt/Konstantin Ponomarev; Russia	points	Dimitri De Fauw/Iljo Keisse; Belgium	points
Sprinters Omnium	Pavel Buráň; Czech Republic	41 points	Ainars. Kiksis; Latvia	36 points	Vesture Berzins; Latvia	32 points
Women's Events
U23 Women's Sprint	Céline Nivert; France		Tamila Abassova; Russia		Lyudmila Vypyraylo; Ukraine	
U23 Women's 500 m Time Trial	Katrin Meinke; Germany	35.36	Daniela Glausnitzer; Germany	35.79	Tamila Abassova; Russia	35.87
U23 Women's Individual Pursuit	Lada Kozlíková; Czech Republic	3:45.94	Julietta Vandekerckhove; France	3:51.52	Gitana Gruodyte; Lithuania	3:54.68
U23 Women's Points Race	Lada Kozlíková; Czech Republic	22 points	Lyudmila Vypyraylo; Ukraine	21 points	Katrin Meinke; Germany	17 points
Open Women's Omnium	Olga Slioussareva; Russia	60 points	Svetlana Ivakhovenkova; Russia	46 points	Vera Carrara; Italy	39 points

=== Juniors ===
Event	Gold		Silver		Bronze	
Men's Events
Junior Men's Sprint	Mathieu Mandard; France		Samuele Marzoli; Italy		Sergey Borisov; Russia	
Junior Men's 1 km Time Trial	Alois Kaňkovský; Czech Republic	1:06.036	Ruben Donet Gregori; Spain	1:07.313	Alexei Tchounossov; Russia	1:07.899
Junior Men's Individual Pursuit	Milan Behunek; Czech Republic	3:29.544	Vitaliy Kondrut; Ukraine	3:30.847	Martin Goldinger; Switzerland	3:33.648
Junior Men's Team Pursuit	Milan Behunek; Jan Kunta; Tomas Macka; Zdenek Zdimal; Czech Republic		Alexey Shmidt; Ilya Krestianinov; Roman Paramonov; Alexei Tchounossov; Russia		Loris Gobbi; Thomas Unari; Flavio Lucchini; Davide Viganò; Italy	
Junior Men's Team Sprint	Mathieu Mandard; Michael Murat; François Pervis; France	1:17.289	Jaroslav Flendr; Alois Kaňkovský; Albert Pance; Czech Republic	1:18.168	Aris Abassov; Nikolai Dmitriev; Sergey Borisov; Russia	1:16.212
Junior Men's Points Race	Alexey Shmidt; Russia	26 points	Vitaliy Kondrut; Ukraine	9 points	Alois Kaňkovský; Czech Republic	35 points, – 1 lap
Women's Events
Junior Women's Sprint	Clara Sanchez; France		Valentina Alessio; Italy		Sharon Vandromme; Belgium	
Junior Women's 500 m Time Trial	Valentina Alessio; Italy	37.316	Clara Sanchez; France	37.450	Jolita Papinigyte; Lithuania	38.105
Junior Women's Individual Pursuit	Gessica Turato; Italy	2:36.646	Diana Elementaite; Lithuania	2:37.380	Lenka Valova; Czech Republic	2:37.866
Junior Women's Points Race	Giorgia Bronzini; Italy	45 points	Natalia Boiarskaia; Russia	19 points	Eleonora Soldo; Italy	31 points, – 1 lap

== Medal table ==
Rank	Nation	Gold	Silver	Bronze	Total
1	Czech Republic (CZE)	7	2	2	11
2	France (FRA)	6	3	0	9
3	Italy (ITA)	4	2	3	9
4	Russia (RUS)	2	5	5	12
5	Ukraine (UKR)	2	3	1	6
6	Germany (GER)	2	1	1	4
7	Switzerland (SUI)	1	1	1	3
8	Great Britain (GBR)	1	0	0	1
9	Lithuania (LTU)	0	3	3	6
10	Spain (ESP)	0	3	0	3
11	Poland (POL)	0	1	2	3
12	Latvia (LAT)	0	1	1	2
13	Belgium (BEL)	0	0	2	2
13	Netherlands (NED)	0	0	2	2
15	Austria (AUT)	0	0	1	1
15	Greece (GRE)	0	0	1	1
Totals (16 entries)		25	25	25	75
