= Natasha Grillo =

Italian cyclist

Personal information
- Born: 17 November 1995 (age 30) Portomaggiore

Cycling career
- Sport: Cycling
- Role: Rider

Natasha Grillo (born 17 November 1995) is an Italian professional racing cyclist.

== See also ==
- Top Girls Fassa Bortolo
