= Alexander Petrovskiy =

Russian cyclist

Personal information
- Full name: Aleksandr Alekseyevich Petrovskiy
- Born: 3 March 1989 (age 37) Tashkent, Uzbek SSR, Soviet Union
- Height: 1.86 m (6 ft 1 in)
- Weight: 87 kg (192 lb)

Cycling career
- Sport: Cycling
- Current team: Team Katusha–Alpecin
- Discipline: Track
- Role: Rider
- Rider type: Pursuit

Professional team
- 2008–: Team Katusha–Alpecin

Aleksandr Alekseyevich Petrovskiy (also Alexander Petrovskiy, Александр Алексеевич Петровский; born 3 March 1989 in Tashkent, Uzbek SSR) is a Russian professional track cyclist. He shared gold medals with Evgeny Kovalev in men's madison at the 2007 UCI Track Cycling Junior World Championships in Aguascalientes, Mexico, and later represented his nation Russia at the 2008 Summer Olympics. During his sporting career, Petrovskiy also raced for the under-23 division of Team Katusha–Alpecin Pro Cycling.

Petrovskiy qualified for the Russian squad in the men's team pursuit at the 2008 Summer Olympics in Beijing based on the nation's selection process from the UCI Track World Rankings. He delivered the Russian foursome of Alexei Markov, Alexander Serov, and Nikolay Trusov an eighth-place time of 4:06.518 in the prelims before his team was later relegated and overlapped to the Brits (led by Olympic time trial champion Bradley Wiggins) in the fourth match round.

== Career highlights ==
2007
(gold) UCI Juniors Track World Championships (Madison), Aguascalientes (MEX)
(silver) UCI Juniors Track World Championships (Team pursuit with Evgeny Kovalev), Aguascalientes (MEX)
2nd UCI European Junior Track Championships (Madison), Cottbus (GER)
3rd UCI European Junior Track Championships (Team pursuit), Cottbus (GER)
2008
2nd UCI European U23 Track Championships (Team pursuit), Pruszków (POL)
8th Olympic Games (Team pursuit with Alexei Markov, Alexander Serov, and Nikolay Trusov), Beijing (CHN)
2009
3rd Stage 1, Grand Prix du Portugal, Paredes (POR)
3rd Stage 3, Udmurt Republic Stage Race, Udmurtia (RUS)
