= Kleanthis Bargkas =

Greek cyclist (born 1978)

Personal information
- Born: 24 July 1978 (age 48) Thessaloniki, Greece

Cycling career
- Sport: Cycling

Kleanthis Bargkas (born 24 July 1978) is a Greek cyclist. He competed in the men's team sprint at the 2000 Summer Olympics.
