= European Track Championships – Women's under-23 sprint =

UEC European Champion jersey

The U23 Women's Sprint at the European Track Championships was first competed in 1997 (according to cyclingarchives.com).

== Medalists ==
This list is incomplete. You can help wikipedia by expanding it. Information could be found on the existing European Track Championships pages (see column: Championships) and here: "European Championship, Track, Sprint, U23 (F)". cyclingarchives.com. Archived from the original on January 21, 2013.

Championships	Gold	Silver	Bronze
1997			
1998			
1999			
2001 Brno			
2002 Büttgen			
2003 Moscow			
2004 Valencia			
2005 Fiorenzuola			
2006 Athens			
2007 Cottbus			
2008 Pruszkow			
2009 Minsk			
2010 St. Petersburg			
2011 Anadia			
2012 Anadia			
