= Carolina Lüthi =

Swiss rower

Personal information
- Nationality: Swiss
- Born: 11 February 1972 (age 53); Lucerne, Switzerland

Sport
- Sport: Rowing

Carolina Lüthi (born 11 February 1972) is a Swiss rower. She competed at the 2000 Summer Olympics and the 2004 Summer Olympics.
