= Yulia Aroustamova =

Russian cyclist

Personal information
- Born: 23 November 1982 Moscow, Russian Soviet Federative Socialist Republic, Soviet Union
- Died: 5 July 2007 (aged 24) Moscow, Russia

Cycling career
- Sport: Cycling
- Role: Rider (track)
Medal record
Representing Russia
European Track Championships
Silver medal – second place	2006 Athens	Omnium

Yulia Aroustamova (23 November 1982 – 5 July 2007) was a Russian track racing cyclist.

Aroustamova won in 2002, 2003 and 2004 different medals at European Track Cycling Championships for under-23, including a gold on in the scratch in 2003. She won the silver medal in the elite omnium at the 2006 European Track Championships.
