= European Track Championships – Women's under-23 individual pursuit =

Female youth track team's performance at a 1996 competition

UEC European Champion jersey

The Women's under-23 individual pursuit at the European Track Championships was first competed in 1996 (according to cyclingarchives.com).

== Medalists ==
Championships	Gold	Silver	Bronze
1996			Cathy Moncassin-Prime (FRA)
1997	Rasa Mažeikytė (LTU)	Anke Wichmann (GER)	Cathy Moncassin-Prime (FRA)
1998	Rasa Mažeikytė (LTU)	Anouska van der Zee (NED)	Michelle Ward (GBR)
1999	Gitana Gruodyte (LTU)	Christina Becker (GER)	Cornelia Cyrus (GER)
2001 Brno	Lada Kozlíková (CZE)	Juliette Vandekerckhove (FRA)	Gitana Gruodyte (LTU)
2002 Büttgen	Vera Carrara (ITA)	Vera Koedooder (NED)	Neringa Raudonyte (LTU)
2003 Moscow	Apollinaria Bakova (RUS)	Vera Koedooder (NED)	Oxana Kostenko (RUS)
2004 Valencia	Oxana Kostenko (RUS)	Tatsiana Sharakova (BLR)	Vera Koedooder (NED)
2005 Fiorenzuola	Tatsiana Sharakova (BLR)	Marlijn Binnendijk (NED)	Pascale Schnider (SUI)
2006 Athens	Tatsiana Sharakova (BLR)	Pascale Schnider (SUI)	Tatiana Guderzo (ITA)
2007 Cottbus	Lesya Kalytovska (UKR)	Svitlana Halyuk (UKR)	Vilija Sereikaitė (LTU)
2008 Pruszków	Vilija Sereikaitė (LTU)	Ellen van Dijk (NED)	Joanna Rowsell (GBR)
2009 Minsk	Vilija Sereikaitė (LTU)	Lesya Kalytovska (UKR)	Aušrinė Trebaitė (LTU)
2010 St. Petersburg	Aksana Papko (BLR)	Lucie Záleská (CZE)	Vaida Pikauskaitė (LTU)
2011 Anadia	Laura Trott (GBR)	Katarzyna Pawłowska (POL)	Eugenia Alickun (POL)
