= Didier Henriette =

French cyclist (born 1985)

Personal information
- Born: 6 December 1985 (age 40) Saint-Denis, Réunion

Cycling career
- Sport: Cycling
- Disciplines: Racing (current); Track (2003-2008)
- Role: Rider

Amateur team
- 2007-2008: Cofidis Spring Cycling Team

Didier Henriette (born 6 December 1985 in Saint-Denis, Réunion) is a French professional racing cyclist who was active as an elite track cyclist between 2003 and 2008. In 2007 and 2008, he competed as part of the French Cofidis sprint cycling team in the UEC European Track Championships (U23 & Junior) and the Los Angeles Team Sprint Competition.

== Career highlights ==
2003
National Championship, Track, Juniors, France (FRA)

1st in 1km
2nd in Sprint

2nd in World Championship, Track, 1 km, Juniors, Moscou
2004
3rd in National Championship, Track, 1 km, U23, France (FRA)
2005
2nd in European Championship, Track, Keirin, U23, Fiorenzuola
National Championship, Track, U23, France (FRA)

3rd in 1 km
3rd in Sprint

3rd in Los Angeles, Team Sprint (USA)

2006
2nd in European Championship, Track, Team Sprint, U23, Athens
National Championship, Track, France, Hyères (FRA)

2nd in Sprint, U23
3rd in Team Sprint, Elite

2007
European Championship, Track, U23, Cottbus (GER)

1st in 1 km
1st in Team Sprint

1st in Aigle, Sprint (SUI)
National Championship, Track, Elite, France (FRA)

2nd in Keirin
2nd in Team Sprint
2nd in 1 km

3rd in Sydney, Team Sprint (AUS)
2008
1st in Los Angeles, Team Sprint (USA)
