= Poland at the UEC European Track Championships =

Poland at the European Track Championships is an overview of the results from Poland at the European Track Championships.

== European Track Championships (elite) 2010-current ==
Poland at the European Track Championships (elite)
- IOC code: POL

European Track Championships (elite) appearances
- 2010; 2011; 2012; 2013; 2014; 2015; 2016

=== Medalists ===
This is a list of medals won at the UEC European Track Championships for elite riders from 2010 to current.

Medal	Championship	Name	Event
Bronze	(Poland) 2010 Pruszków	Małgorzata Wojtyra	Women's omnium
Bronze	(Poland) 2010 Pruszków	Rafał Ratajczyk	Men's omnium
Gold	(Netherlands) 2011 Apeldoorn	Rafał Ratajczyk	Men's points race
Silver	(Netherlands) 2011 Apeldoorn	Katarzyna Pawłowska	Women's points race
Bronze	(Netherlands) 2011 Apeldoorn	Maciej Bielecki; Kamil Kuczyński; Damian Zieliński	Men's team sprint
Silver	(Lithuania) 2012 Panevėžys	Maciej Bielecki; Kamil Kuczyński; Krzysztof Maksel	Men's team sprint
Silver	(Lithuania) 2012 Panevėžys	Katarzyna Pawłowska; Eugenia Bujak; Małgorzata Wojtyra	Women's team pursuit
Bronze	(Lithuania) 2012 Panevėžys	Katarzyna Pawłowska	Women's omnium
Silver	(Netherlands) 2013 Apeldoorn	Katarzyna Pawłowska; Eugenia Bujak; Małgorzata Wojtyra; Edyta Jasińska	Women's team pursuit
Gold	(France) 2014 Baie-Mahault	Eugenia Bujak	Women's points race
Silver	(France) 2014 Baie-Mahault	Damian Zieliński	Men's sprint
Gold	(Switzerland) 2015 Grenchen	Katarzyna Pawłowska	Women's points race
Gold	(Switzerland) 2015 Grenchen	Wojciech Pszczolarski	Men's points race
Silver	(Switzerland) 2015 Grenchen	Grzegorz Drejgier; Rafał Sarnecki; Krzysztof Maksel	Men's team sprint
Bronze	(Switzerland) 2015 Grenchen	Damian Zieliński	Men's sprint
Bronze	(Switzerland) 2015 Grenchen	Adrian Tekliński	Men's scratch race
Gold	(France) 2016 Saint-Quentin-en-Yvelines	Maciej Bielecki; Kamil Kuczyński; Mateusz Lipa; Mateusz Rudyk	Men's team sprint
Silver	(France) 2016 Saint-Quentin-en-Yvelines	Adrian Tekliński	Men's scratch race
Silver	(France) 2016 Saint-Quentin-en-Yvelines	Katarzyna Pawłowska; Justyna Kaczkowska; Daria Pikulik; Nikol Płosaj; Łucja Pietrzak	Women's team pursuit
Silver	(France) 2016 Saint-Quentin-en-Yvelines	Justyna Kaczkowska	Women's pursuit
Bronze	(France) 2016 Saint-Quentin-en-Yvelines	Katarzyna Pawłowska	Women's points race
Gold	(Germany) 2017 Berlin	Alan Banaszek	Men's points race
Silver	(Germany) 2017 Berlin	Justyna Kaczkowska	Women's pursuit
Bronze	(Germany) 2017 Berlin	Katarzyna Pawłowska; Justyna Kaczkowska; Daria Pikulik; Nikol Płosaj	Women's team pursuit
Bronze	(Germany) 2017 Berlin	Wojciech Pszczolarski; Daniel Staniszewski	Men's madison
Gold	(United Kingdom) 2018 Glasgow	Wojciech Pszczolarski	Men's points race
Bronze	(United Kingdom) 2018 Glasgow	Justyna Kaczkowska	Women's pursuit
Bronze	(United Kingdom) 2018 Glasgow	Szymon Krawczyk	Men's elimination race
Bronze	(Netherlands) 2019 Apeldoorn	Nikol Płosaj	Women's elimination race
Bronze	(Netherlands) 2019 Apeldoorn	Filip Prokopyszyn	Men's elimination race
Bronze	(Netherlands) 2019 Apeldoorn	Mateusz Rudyk	Men's sprint
Bronze	(Bulgaria) 2020 Plovdiv	Karolina Karasiewicz	Women's points race
Gold	(Switzerland) 2021 Grenchen	Alan Banaszek	Men's omnium
Bronze	(Switzerland) 2021 Grenchen	Daria Pikulik	Women's scratch
Bronze	(Switzerland) 2021 Grenchen	Maciej Bielecki; Patryk Rajkowski; Mateusz Rudyk; Daniel Rochna	Men's team sprint
Bronze	(Switzerland) 2021 Grenchen	Patryk Rajkowski	Men's 1 km time trial
Silver	(Germany) 2022 Munich	Urszula Łoś	Women's keirin
Bronze	(Germany) 2022 Munich	Marlena Karwacka; Urszula Łoś; Nikola Sibiak	Women's team sprint
Bronze	(Germany) 2022 Munich	Nikola Wielowska	Women's scratch
Bronze	(Germany) 2022 Munich	Daria Pikulik	Women's omnium
Silver	(Switzerland) 2023 Grenchen	Daria Pikulik	Women's omnium
Silver	(Switzerland) 2023 Grenchen	Mateusz Rudyk	Men's sprint
Silver	(Switzerland) 2023 Grenchen	Patryk Rajkowski	Men's keirin
Bronze	(Switzerland) 2023 Grenchen	Daria Pikulik	Women's scratch
Silver	(Netherlands) 2024 Apeldoorn	Mateusz Rudyk	Men's sprint
Silver	(Netherlands) 2024 Apeldoorn	Mateusz Rudyk	Men's keirin
Bronze	(Netherlands) 2024 Apeldoorn	Maciej Bielecki; Rafał Sarnecki; Mateusz Rudyk; Daniel Rochna	Men's team sprint

=== Medals by year ===
Championship	Gold	Silver	Bronze	Total	Rank
(Poland) 2010 Pruszków	0	0	2	2	11th
(Netherlands) 2011 Apeldoorn	1	1	1	3	4th
(Lithuania) 2012 Panevėžys	0	2	1	3	7th
(Netherlands) 2013 Apeldoorn	0	1	0	1	8th
(France) 2014 Guadeloupe	1	1	0	2	7th
(Switzerland) 2015 Grenchen	2	1	2	5	4th
(France) 2016 Saint-Quentin-en-Yvelines	1	3	1	5	8th
(Germany) 2017 Berlin	1	1	2	4	8th
(United Kingdom) 2018 Glasgow	1	0	2	3	9th
(Netherlands) 2019 Apeldoorn	0	0	3	3	13th
(Bulgaria) 2020 Plovdiv	0	0	1	1	11th
(Switzerland) 2021 Grenchen	1	0	3	4	9th
(Germany) 2022 Munich	0	1	3	4	9th
(Switzerland) 2023 Grenchen	0	3	1	4	9th
(Netherlands) 2024 Apeldoorn	0	2	1	3	
Total	8	16	23	47	

== Most successful Polish competitors ==
Name	Medals	Championships
Wojciech Pszczolarski	2 gold, 0 silver, 1 bronze	(gold) 2015 Grenchen – Men's points race (gold) 2018 Glasgow – Men's points race (bronze) 2017 Berlin – Men's madison
Alan Banaszek	2 gold, 0 silver, 0 bronze	(gold) 2017 Berlin – Men's points race (gold) 2021 Grenchen – Men's omnium
Katarzyna Pawłowska	1 gold, 4 silver, 4 bronze	(gold) 2015 Grenchen – Women's points race (silver) 2011 Apeldoorn – Women's points race (silver) 2012 Panevėžys – Women's team pursuit (silver) 2013 Apeldoorn – Women's team pursuit (silver) 2016 Saint-Quentin-en-Yvelines – Women's team pursuit (bronze) 2012 Panevėžys – Women's omnium (bronze) 2013 Apeldoorn – Women's team pursuit (bronze) 2016 Saint-Quentin-en-Yvelines – Women's points race (bronze) 2017 Berlin – Women's team pursuit
Mateusz Rudyk	1 gold, 3 silver, 3 bronze	(gold) 2016 Saint-Quentin-en-Yvelines – Men's team sprint (silver) 2023 Grenchen – Men's sprint (silver) 2024 Apeldoorn – Men's sprint (silver) 2024 Apeldoorn – Men's keirin (bronze) 2019 Apeldoorn – Men's sprint (bronze) 2021 Grenchen – Men's team sprint (bronze) 2024 Apeldoorn – Men's team sprint
Eugenia Bujak	1 gold, 2 silver, 0 bronze	(gold) 2014 Baie-Mahault – Women's points race (silver) 2012 Panevėžys – Women's team pursuit (silver) 2013 Apeldoorn – Women's team pursuit
Maciej Bielecki	1 gold, 1 silver, 3 bronze	(gold) 2016 Saint-Quentin-en-Yvelines – Men's team sprint (silver) 2012 Panevėžys – Men's team sprint (bronze) 2011 Apeldoorn – Men's team sprint (bronze) 2021 Grenchen – Men's team sprint (bronze) 2024 Apeldoorn – Men's team sprint
Kamil Kuczyński	1 gold, 1 silver, 1 bronze	(gold) 2016 Saint-Quentin-en-Yvelines – Men's team sprint (silver) 2012 Panevėžys – Men's team sprint (bronze) 2011 Apeldoorn – Men's team sprint
Rafał Ratajczyk	1 gold, 0 silver, 1 bronze	(gold) 2011 Apeldoorn – Men's points race (bronze) 2010 Pruszków – Men's omnium
Justyna Kaczkowska	0 gold, 3 silver, 1 bronze	(silver) 2016 Saint-Quentin-en-Yvelines – Women's team pursuit (silver) 2016 Saint-Quentin-en-Yvelines – Women's individual pursuit (silver) 2017 Berlin – Women's individual pursuit (bronze) 2018 Glasgow – Women's individual pursuit
Daria Pikulik	0 gold, 2 silver, 4 bronze	(silver) 2016 Saint-Quentin-en-Yvelines – Women's team pursuit (silver) 2023 Grenchen – Women's omnium (bronze) 2017 Berlin – Women's team pursuit (bronze) 2021 Grenchen – Women's scratch (bronze) 2022 Munich – Women's omnium (bronze) 2023 Grenchen – Women's scratch
Patryk Rajkowski	0 gold, 1 silver, 2 bronze	(silver) 2023 Grenchen – Men's keirin (bronze) 2021 Grenchen – Men's 1 km time trial (bronze) 2021 Grenchen – Men's team sprint

== See also ==
- Belarus at the European Track Championships
- Netherlands at the European Track Championships
