= Great Britain at the UEC European Track Championships =

Great Britain at the European Track Championships is an overview of the British results at the European Track Championships. Since 2001 there are the European Track Championships for under-23 and junior riders and since 2010 the European Track Championships for elite riders. Note that the under-23 and junior championships before 2010 also included omnium elite events.

== European Track Championships (elite) 2010-current ==
Great Britain at the European Track Championships (elite)
- IOC code: GBR

2010 –
- Medals Ranked 1st: Gold 55 Silver 35 Bronze 28 Total 118

European Track Championships (elite) appearances
- 2010; 2011; 2012; 2013; 2014; 2015; 2016; 2017; 2018; 2019; 2020; 2021; 2022; 2023; 2024

=== Medalists ===
This is a list of medals won at the UEC European Track Championships for elite riders from 2010 to current.

Medal	Championship	Name	Event
Gold	2008	Matthew Crampton	Men's under-23 keirin
Gold	2008	Steven Burke; Peter Kennaugh; Mark McNally; Andy Tennant	Men's under-23 team pursuit
Gold	2008	Lizzie Armitstead; Katie Colclough; Joanna Rowsell	Women's under-23 team pursuit
Gold	2008	Lizzie Armitstead	Women's under-23 scratch race
Gold	2008	Mark Christian; Luke Rowe	Junior Men's Madison
Gold	2008	Jessica Varnish	Junior Women's 500 m time trial
Gold	2008	Hannah Mayho	Junior Women's Individual Pursuit
Gold	2008	Alex Greenfield; Hannah Mayho; Jessica Booth	Junior Women's Team Pursuit
Gold	2008	Jessica Varnish	Junior Women's Keirin
Gold	2008	Alex Greenfield	Junior Women's Points Race
Silver	2008	Lizzie Armitstead	U23 Women's Points race
Silver	2008	Matthew Crampton; David Daniell; Christian Lyte	Men's under-23 team sprint
Silver	2008	David Daniell	U23 Men's 1 km time trial
Silver	2008	Luke Rowe; Mark Christian; Andrew Fenn; Erick Rowsell	Junior Men's Team Pursuit
Silver	2008	Steven Hill; Luc Jones; Peter Mitchell	Junior Men's Team Sprint
Silver	2008	Steven Hill	Junior Men's Keirin
Bronze	2008	Matthew Crampton	U23 Men's sprint
Bronze	2008	Anna Blyth	Women's under-23 sprint
Bronze	2008	Anna Blyth	Women's under-23 500 m time trial
Bronze	2008	Joanna Rowsell	Women's under-23 individual pursuit
Bronze	2008	Peter Mitchell	Junior Men's Sprint
Bronze	2008	Mark Christian	Junior Men's Individual Pursuit
Bronze	2008	Jessica Vernish	Junior Women's Sprint
Gold	(Poland) 2010 Pruszków	Jason Kenny	Men's keirin
Gold	(Poland) 2010 Pruszków	Steven Burke; Ed Clancy; Jason Queally; Andy Tennant	Men's team pursuit
Gold	(Poland) 2010 Pruszków	Katie Colclough; Wendy Houvenaghel; Laura Trott	Women's team pursuit
Silver	(Poland) 2010 Pruszków	Matt Crampton	Men's keirin
Silver	(Poland) 2010 Pruszków	Victoria Pendelton; Jessica Varnish	Women's team sprint
Bronze	(Poland) 2010 Pruszków	Jason Kenny	Men's sprint
Bronze	(Poland) 2010 Pruszków	Matt Crampton; Chris Hoy; Jason Kenny	Men's team sprint
Gold	(Netherlands) 2011 Apeldoorn	Matthew Crampton	Men's keirin
Gold	(Netherlands) 2011 Apeldoorn	Ed Clancy	Men's omnium
Gold	(Netherlands) 2011 Apeldoorn	Steven Burke; Ed Clancy; Peter Kennaugh; Andy Tennant; Geraint Thomas	Men's team pursuit
Gold	(Netherlands) 2011 Apeldoorn	Victoria Pendleton; Jessica Varnish	Women's team sprint
Gold	(Netherlands) 2011 Apeldoorn	Victoria Pendleton	Women's keirin
Gold	(Netherlands) 2011 Apeldoorn	Laura Trott	Women's omnium
Gold	(Netherlands) 2011 Apeldoorn	Danielle King; Joanna Rowsell; Laura Trott	Women's team pursuit
Bronze	(Lithuania) 2012 Panevėžys	Matthew Crampton; Callum Skinner; Lewis Oliva	Men's team sprint

=== Medals by year ===
Championship	Gold	Silver	Bronze	Total	Rank
(Poland) 2010 Pruszków	3	2	2	7	1st
(Netherlands) 2011 Apeldoorn	7	0	0	7	1st
(Lithuania) 2012 Panevėžys	0	0	1	1	8th
(Netherlands) 2013 Apeldoorn	3	2	3	8	2nd
(France) 2014 Guadeloupe	6	1	1	8	1st
(Switzerland) 2015 Grenchen	6	0	3	9	1st
(France) 2016 Paris	2	4	2	8	3rd
(Germany) 2017 Berlin	3	1	0	4	3rd
(United Kingdom) 2018 Glasgow	4	3	3	10	2nd
(Netherlands) 2019 Apeldoorn	2	3	2	7	5th
(Bulgaria) 2020 Plovdiv	6	3	2	11	1st
(Switzerland) 2021 Grenchen	3	0	2	5	4th
(Germany) 2022 Munich	0	3	2	5	8th
(Switzerland) 2023 Grenchen	4	6	2	12	2nd
(Netherlands) 2024 Apeldoorn	6	6	2	14	1st
Total	55	35	28	118	-

== European Track Championships (under-23 & junior) 2001-current ==
Great Britain at the European Track Championships (under 23 & junior)
- IOC code: GBR

2001 –
- Medals Ranked 3rd: Gold 107 Silver 98 Bronze 89 Total 294

European Track Championships (under 23 & junior) appearances
- 2008; 2009; 2010; 2011; 2012; 2013; 2014; 2015; 2016; 2017; 2018; 2019; 2020; 2021; 2022; 2023; 2024; 2025

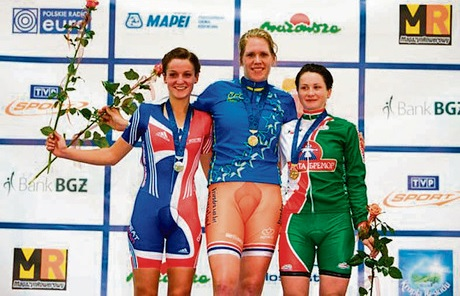
Lizzie Armitstead won silver behind Ellen van Dijk in the 2008 women's under-23 points race

Below is an overview of the Dutch results at the European Track Championships for under-23 and junior riders. Note that these championships also had a few elite events.

=== Medals by year ===
Championship	Gold	Silver	Bronze	Total	Rank
(Czech Republic) 2001 Brno	1	0	0	1	8th
(Germany) 2002 Büttgen	0	0	1	1	13th
(Russia) 2003 Moscow	0	0	0	0	-
(Spain) 2004 Valence	3	1	0	4	6th
(Italy) 2005 Fiorenzuola d'Arda	3	1	1	5	4th
(Greece) 2006 Athens	6	2	2	10	1st
(Germany) 2007 Cottbus	8	7	4	19	1st
(Poland) 2008 Pruszków	10	6	7	23	1st
(Belarus) 2009 Minsk	6	7	7	20	3rd
(Russia) 2010 Saint Petersburg	1	4	1	6	8th
(Portugal) 2011 Anadia	9	10	6	25	1st
(Portugal) 2012 Anadia	4	6	4	14	3rd
(Portugal) 2013 Anadia	3	2	1	6	6th
(Portugal) 2014 Anadia	2	4	4	10	5th
(Greece) 2015 Athens	4	5	3	12	3rd
(Italy) 2016 Monitchiari	5	3	11	19	4th
(Portugal) 2017 Sangalhos	7	6	11	24	3rd
(Switzerland) 2018 Aigle	4	3	3	10	5th
(Belgium) 2019 Ghent	7	5	2	14	2nd
(Italy) 2020 Fiorenzuola d'Arda	-	-	-	-	-
(Netherlands) 2021 Apeldoorn	10	9	8	27	2nd
(Portugal) 2022 Anadia	5	9	7	21	3rd
(Portugal) 2023 Anadia	9	8	6	23	2nd
Total	107	98	89	294	

== See also ==
- Belarus at the European Track Championships
- Netherlands at the European Track Championships
