= 2011 European Track Championships – Women's sprint =

UEC European Champion jersey

The Women's sprint was held on 22 October 2011 with 23 riders participating.

== Medalists ==
Gold	Lyubov Shulika (UKR)
Silver	Olga Panarina (BLR)
Bronze	Viktoria Baranova (RUS)

== Results ==
=== Qualifying ===
Fastest 24 riders advanced to 1/16 finals, the qualifying was held at 12:05.

Rank	Name	Nation	Time	Notes
1	Olga Panarina	Belarus	11.045	Q
2	Lyubov Shulika	Ukraine	11.193	Q
3	Sandie Clair	France	11.300	Q
4	Victoria Pendleton	Great Britain	11.320	Q
5	Viktoria Baranova	Russia	11.346	Q
6	Jessica Varnish	Great Britain	11.370	Q
7	Clara Sanchez	France	11.384	Q
8	Olga Streltsova	Russia	11.432	Q
9	Simona Krupeckaitė	Lithuania	11.453	Q
10	Kristina Vogel	Germany	11.472	Q
11	Willy Kanis	Netherlands	11.610	Q
12	Yvonne Hijgenaar	Netherlands	11.625	Q
13	Miriam Welte	Germany	11.654	Q
14	Tania Calvo	Spain	11.660	Q
15	Olena Tsyos	Ukraine	11.701	Q
16	Helena Casas	Spain	11.877	Q
17	Angeliki Koutsonikoli	Greece	11.935	Q
18	Dimitra Patapi	Greece	11.947	Q
19	Elisa Frisoni	Italy	12.218	Q
20	Manuela Grillo	Italy	12.534	Q
21	Gabriele Jankute	Lithuania	12.639	Q
22	Alena Dylko	Belarus	13.146	Q
23	Monika Alango	Estonia	14.863	Q

=== 1/16 Finals ===
Winner of each heat qualified to 1/8 Finals, the races were held at 13:16.

Heat	Rank	Name	Nation	Time	Notes
1	1	Olga Panarina	Belarus		Bye
2	1	Lyubov Shulika	Ukraine	13.237	Q
2	2	Monika Alango	Estonia		
3	1	Sandie Clair	France	13.766	Q
3	2	Alena Dylko	Belarus		
4	1	Victoria Pendleton	Great Britain	11.916	Q
4	2	Gabriele Jankute	Lithuania		
5	1	Viktoria Baranova	Russia	12.634	Q
5	2	Manuela Grillo	Italy		
6	1	Jessica Varnish	Great Britain	12.145	Q
6	2	Elisa Frisoni	Italy		
7	1	Clara Sanchez	France	12.011	Q
7	2	Dimitra Patapi	Greece		
8	1	Olga Streltsova	Russia	12.307	Q
8	2	Angeliki Koutsonikoli	Greece		
9	1	Simona Krupeckaitė	Lithuania	12.351	Q
9	2	Helena Casas	Spain		
10	1	Kristina Vogel	Germany	11.938	Q
10	2	Olena Tsyos	Ukraine		
11	1	Tania Calvo	Spain	11.878	Q
11	2	Willy Kanis	Netherlands		
12	1	Miriam Welte	Germany	12.075	Q
12	2	Yvonne Hijgenaar	Netherlands		

=== 1/8 Finals ===
Winner of each heat qualified to 1/4 Finals, losers went to the repêchage. The races were held at 14:10.

Heat	Rank	Name	Nation	Time	Notes
1	1	Olga Panarina	Belarus	12.326	Q
1	2	Miriam Welte	Germany		
2	1	Lyubov Shulika	Ukraine	12.021	Q
2	2	Tania Calvo	Spain		
3	1	Kristina Vogel	Germany	11.792	Q
3	2	Sandie Clair	France		
4	1	Simona Krupeckaitė	Lithuania	11.707	Q
4	2	Victoria Pendleton	Great Britain		
5	1	Viktoria Baranova	Russia	11.933	Q
5	2	Olga Streltsova	Russia		
6	1	Clara Sanchez	France	11.923	Q
6	2	Jessica Varnish	Great Britain		

=== 1/8 Finals Repechage ===
The loser of the 1/8 Finals raced, winners advanced to the Quarterfinals. Races were held at 14:34.

Heat	Rank	Name	Nation	Time	Notes
1	1	Victoria Pendleton	Great Britain	13.002	Q
1	2	Miriam Welte	Germany		
1	3	Jessica Varnish	Great Britain		
2	1	Sandie Clair	France	12.034	Q
2	2	Tania Calvo	Spain		
2	3	Olga Streltsova	Russia		

=== Quarterfinals ===
The races were held at 15:22, 16:16 and 16:26.

Heat	Rank	Name	Nation	Race 1	Race 2	Decider	Notes
1	1	Olga Panarina	Belarus	11.806	11.704		Q
1	2	Sandie Clair	France				
2	1	Lyubov Shulika	Ukraine	11.655	11.711		Q
2	2	Victoria Pendleton	Great Britain				
3	1	Clara Sanchez	France	11.873	11.571		Q
3	2	Kristina Vogel	Germany				
4	1	Viktoria Baranova	Russia	11.791		11.868	Q
4	2	Simona Krupeckaitė	Lithuania		12.292		

=== Race for 5th-8th Places ===
The race was held at 20:45.

Rank	Name	Nation	Time
5	Kristina Vogel	Germany	11.852
6	Simona Krupeckaitė	Lithuania	
7	Sandie Clair	France	
8	Victoria Pendleton	Great Britain	

=== Semifinals ===
The races were held at 19:30 and 20:12.

Heat	Rank	Name	Nation	Race 1	Race 2	Decider	Notes
1	1	Olga Panarina	Belarus	11.576	12.044		Q
1	2	Viktoria Baranova	Russia				
2	1	Lyubov Shulika	Ukraine	11.840	11.690		Q
2	2	Clara Sanchez	France				

=== Finals ===
The races were held at 21:10 and 21:25.

Rank	Name	Nation	Race 1	Race 2	Decider
Gold Medal Races
1st place, gold medalist(s)	Lyubov Shulika	Ukraine	11.539	12.046	
2nd place, silver medalist(s)	Olga Panarina	Belarus			
Bronze Medal Races
3rd place, bronze medalist(s)	Viktoria Baranova	Russia	11.711	11.823	
4	Clara Sanchez	France			
