= 2010 European Track Championships – Women's sprint =

Cycle race in Pruszków, Poland

UEC European Champion jersey

The Women's sprint was one of the 5 women's events at the 2010 European Track Championships, held in Pruszków, Poland.

18 cyclists participated in the contest.

The event was held on November 6.

== World record ==
World Record
WR	10.793	Simona Krupeckaitė (LTU)	(Russia) Moscow	29 May 2010

== Results ==
=== Qualifying ===
Fastest 16 riders advanced to 1/16 finals.

Rank	Name	Nation	Time	Notes
1	Olga Panarina	Belarus	11.166	Q
2	Jessica Varnish	Great Britain	11.273	Q
3	Clara Sanchez	France	11.321	Q
4	Willy Kanis	Netherlands	11.330	Q
5	Sandie Clair	France	11.339	Q
6	Kristina Vogel	Germany	11.369	Q
7	Simona Krupeckaitė	Lithuania	11.414	Q
8	Miriam Welte	Germany	11.530	Q
9	Yvonne Hijgenaar	Netherlands	11.536	Q
10	Viktoria Baranova	Russia	11.654	Q
11	Lyubov Shulika	Ukraine	11.725	Q
12	Angeliki Koutsonikoli	Greece	11.727	Q
13	Ekaterina Gnidenko	Russia	11.828	Q
14	Helena Casas	Spain	11.875	Q
15	Dimitra Patapi	Greece	11.921	Q
16	Olena Tsyos	Ukraine	11.972	Q
17	Tania Calvo	Spain	11.978	
18	Gintarė Gaivenytė	Lithuania	11.982	
19	Mary Costelloe	Ireland	12.765	
–	Elisa Frisoni	Italy		DNS

=== 1/16 Finals ===
Winner of each heat qualified to 1/16 Finals Losers went to Repechages

Heat	Rank	Name	Nation	Time	Notes
1	1	Olga Panarina	Belarus	12.549	Q
1	2	Olena Tsyos	Ukraine		
2	1	Jessica Varnish	Great Britain	12.050	Q
2	2	Dimitra Patapi	Greece		
3	1	Clara Sanchez	France	12.048	Q
3	2	Helena Casas	Spain		
4	1	Willy Kanis	Netherlands	13.236	Q
4	2	Ekaterina Gnidenko	Russia		
5	1	Sandie Clair	France	12.075	Q
5	2	Angeliki Koutsonikoli	Greece		
6	1	Kristina Vogel	Germany	11.871	Q
6	2	Lyubov Shulika	Ukraine		
7	1	Simona Krupeckaitė	Lithuania	11.844	Q
7	2	Viktoria Baranova	Russia		
8	1	Miriam Welte	Germany	12.378	Q
8	2	Yvonne Hijgenaar	Netherlands		

=== 1/16 Finals Repechage ===
Heat	Rank	Name	Nation	Time	Notes
1	1	Olena Tsyos	Ukraine	12.629	Q
1	2	Yvonne Hijgenaar	Netherlands		
2	1	Viktoria Baranova	Russia	12.327	Q
2	2	Dimitra Patapi	Greece		
3	1	Lyubov Shulika	Ukraine	12.112	Q
3	2	Helena Casas	Spain		
4	1	Angeliki Koutsonikoli	Greece	12.472	Q
4	2	Ekaterina Gnidenko	Russia		

=== 1/8 Finals ===
Winner of each heat qualified to 1/4 Finals. Losers went to repêchages.

Heat	Rank	Name	Nation	Time	Notes
1	1	Olga Panarina	Belarus	12.469	Q
1	2	Angeliki Koutsonikoli	Greece		
2	1	Lyubov Shulika	Ukraine	12.154	Q
2	2	Jessica Varnish	Great Britain		
3	1	Clara Sanchez	France	11.700	Q
3	2	Viktoria Baranova	Russia		
4	1	Willy Kanis	Netherlands	11.966	Q
4	2	Olena Tsyos	Ukraine		
5	1	Sandie Clair	France	12.130	Q
5	2	Miriam Welte	Germany		
6	1	Simona Krupeckaitė	Lithuania	11.961	Q
6	2	Kristina Vogel	Germany		

=== 1/8 Finals Repechage ===
Heat	Rank	Name	Nation	Time	Notes
1	1	Kristina Vogel	Germany	12.426	Q
1	2	Angeliki Koutsonikoli	Greece		
1	3	Olena Tsyos	Ukraine		
2	1	Jessica Varnish	Great Britain	11.981	Q
2	2	Miriam Welte	Germany		
2	3	Viktoria Baranova	Russia		

=== Quarterfinals ===
Heat	Rank	Name	Nation	Race 1	Race 2	Decider	Notes
1	1	Olga Panarina	Belarus	11.867	11.775		Q
1	2	Jessica Varnish	Great Britain				
2	1	Kristina Vogel	Germany	12.107	12.234		Q
2	2	Lyubov Shulika	Ukraine				
3	1	Simona Krupeckaitė	Lithuania	11.719	11.568		Q
3	2	Clara Sanchez	France				
4	1	Sandie Clair	France	11.859		12.238	Q
4	2	Willy Kanis	Netherlands		12.026		

=== Race for 5th-8th Places ===
Rank	Name	Nation	Time
5	Willy Kanis	Netherlands	12.015
6	Jessica Varnish	Great Britain	
7	Lyubov Shulika	Ukraine	
8	Clara Sanchez	France	

=== Semifinals ===
Heat	Rank	Name	Nation	Race 1	Race 2	Decider	Notes
1	1	Sandie Clair	France		12.109	12.178	Q
1	2	Olga Panarina	Belarus	12.244			
2	1	Kristina Vogel	Germany	11.777		11.800	Q
2	2	Simona Krupeckaitė	Lithuania		11.819		

=== Finals ===
Rank	Name	Nation	Race 1	Race 2	Decider
Gold Medal Races
1st place, gold medalist(s)	Sandie Clair	France	11.991	12.291	
2nd place, silver medalist(s)	Kristina Vogel	Germany			
Bronze Medal Races
3rd place, bronze medalist(s)	Simona Krupeckaitė	Lithuania			
4	Olga Panarina	Belarus	DNS	DNS	
