= 2011 European Track Championships – Women's keirin =

UEC European Champion jersey

The Women's keirin was held on 23 October 2011 with 21 riders participating.

== Medalists ==
Gold	Victoria Pendleton (GBR)
Silver	Clara Sanchez (FRA)
Bronze	Sandie Clair (FRA)

== Results ==
=== Qualifying ===
First 2 riders in each heat qualified for the second round, remainder to first round repechage. Races were held at 11:30.

==== Heat 1 ====
Rank	Name	Nation	Notes
1	Kristina Vogel	Germany	Q
2	Viktoria Baranova	Russia	Q
3	Elisa Frisoni	Italy	
4	Jessica Varnish	Great Britain	
5	Yvonne Hijgenaar	Netherlands	
6	Olga Panarina	Belarus	
7	Sandie Clair	France	

==== Heat 2 ====
Rank	Name	Nation	Notes
1	Victoria Pendleton	Great Britain	Q
2	Tania Calvo	Spain	Q
3	Simona Krupeckaitė	Lithuania	
4	Angeliki Koutsonikoli	Greece	
5	Aksana Papko	Belarus	
6	Manuela Grillo	Italy	
7	Olena Tsyos	Ukraine	

==== Heat 3 ====
Rank	Name	Nation	Notes
1	Olga Streltsova	Russia	Q
2	Clara Sanchez	France	Q
3	Willy Kanis	Netherlands	
4	Dimitra Patapi	Greece	
5	Gabriele Jankute	Lithuania	
6	Helena Casas	Spain	
–	Lyubov Shulika	Ukraine	DNS

=== First Round Repechage ===
First two riders in each heat qualified for the second round. Races were held at 13:10.

==== Heat 1 ====
Rank	Name	Nation	Notes
1	Sandie Clair	France	Q
2	Jessica Varnish	Great Britain	Q
3	Yvonne Hijgenaar	Netherlands	
4	Elisa Frisoni	Italy	
5	Gabriele Jankute	Lithuania	

==== Heat 2 ====
Rank	Name	Nation	Notes
1	Simona Krupeckaitė	Lithuania	Q
2	Olga Panarina	Belarus	Q
3	Helena Casas	Spain	
4	Manuela Grillo	Italy	
5	Dimitra Patapi	Greece	

==== Heat 3 ====
Rank	Name	Nation	Notes
1	Willy Kanis	Netherlands	Q
2	Olena Tsyos	Ukraine	Q
3	Angeliki Koutsonikoli	Greece	
4	Aksana Papko	Belarus	

=== Second round ===
First 3 riders in each heat qualified for the final 1–6 and the others to final 7–12. Races were held at 15:38.

==== Heat 1 ====
Rank	Name	Nation	Notes
1	Kristina Vogel	Germany	Q
2	Clara Sanchez	France	Q
3	Sandie Clair	France	Q
4	Olga Panarina	Belarus	
5	Tania Calvo	Spain	
6	Olena Tsyos	Ukraine	

==== Heat 2 ====
Rank	Name	Nation	Notes
1	Viktoria Baranova	Russia	Q
2	Victoria Pendleton	Great Britain	Q
3	Simona Krupeckaitė	Lithuania	Q
4	Jessica Varnish	Great Britain	
5	Willy Kanis	Netherlands	
6	Olga Streltsova	Russia	

=== Finals ===
The 7–12 place final was held at 17:21, with the final being held at 17:25.

==== Final 7–12 places ====
Rank	Name	Nation	Notes
7	Olga Panarina	Belarus	
8	Olga Streltsova	Russia	
9	Willy Kanis	Netherlands	
10	Tania Calvo	Spain	
11	Jessica Varnish	Great Britain	
12	Olena Tsyos	Ukraine	

==== Final ====
Rank	Name	Nation	Notes
1st place, gold medalist(s)	Victoria Pendleton	Great Britain	
2nd place, silver medalist(s)	Clara Sanchez	France	
3rd place, bronze medalist(s)	Sandie Clair	France	
4	Kristina Vogel	Germany	
5	Simona Krupeckaitė	Lithuania	
6	Viktoria Baranova	Russia	
