= 2010 European Track Championships – Women's team sprint =

UEC European Champion jersey

The Women's Team Sprint was one of the 5 women's events at the 2010 European Track Championships, held in Pruszków, Poland.

Ten teams of 2 cyclists each participated in the contest. After the qualifying, the fastest 2 teams raced for gold, and 3rd and 4th teams raced for bronze.

The Qualifying and the Finals were held on November 5.

== World record ==
World Record
WR	32.923	Australia	(Denmark) Copenhagen	25 March 2010

== Qualifying ==
Fastest 2 teams race for gold and 3rd and 4th teams race for bronze.

Rank	Name	Nation	Time	Notes
1	Victoria Pendleton; Jessica Varnish	Great Britain	33.381	Q
2	Sandie Clair; Clara Sanchez	France	33.521	Q
3	Kristina Vogel; Miriam Welte	Germany	33.676	q
4	Yvonne Hijgenaar; Willy Kanis	Netherlands	34.061	q
5	Gintarė Gaivenytė; Simona Krupeckaitė	Lithuania	34.485	
6	Edyta Jasińska; Małgorzata Wojtyra	Poland	34.860	
7	Viktoria Baranova; Ekaterina Gnidenko	Russia	35.159	
8	Tania Calvo; Helena Casas	Spain	35.178	
9	Lyubov Shulika; Olena Tsyos	Ukraine	35.420	
10	Angeliki Koutsonikoli; Dimitra Patapi	Greece	35.660	

== Finals ==
Rank	Name	Nation	Time
Gold Medal Race
1st place, gold medalist(s)	Sandie Clair; Clara Sanchez	France	33.478
2nd place, silver medalist(s)	Victoria Pendleton; Jessica Varnish	Great Britain	33.586
Bronze Medal Race
3rd place, bronze medalist(s)	Kristina Vogel; Miriam Welte	Germany	33.708
4	Yvonne Hijgenaar; Willy Kanis	Netherlands	34.212
