= 2010 European Track Championships – Men's team pursuit =

UEC European Champion jersey

The Men's Team Pursuit was one of the 6 men's events at the 2010 European Track Championships, held in Pruszków, Poland.

Twelve teams of 4 cyclists each participated in the contest. After the qualifying, the fastest 2 teams raced for gold, and 3rd and 4th teams raced for bronze.

The Qualifying and the Finals were held on November 5.

== World record ==
World Record
| WR | 3:53.314 | Great Britain | (China) Beijing | 18 August 2008 |

== Qualifying ==
Fastest 2 teams race for gold and 3rd and 4th teams race for bronze.

| Rank | Name | Nation | Time | Notes |
|---|---|---|---|---|
| 1 | Steven Burke; Edward Clancy; Jason Queally; Andy Tennant | Great Britain | 4:01.953 | Q |
| 2 | Evgeny Kovalev; Ivan Kovalev; Alexei Markov; Alexander Serov | Russia | 4:03.690 | Q |
| 3 | Levi Heimans; Arno van der Zwet; Tim Veldt; Sipke Zijlstra | Netherlands | 4:06.693 | q |
| 4 | Pablo Rosique; Unai Zubiaur; Asier Villalabeitia; David Juaneda | Spain | 4:07.865 | q |
| 5 | Angelo Ciccone; Marco Coledan; Alessandro De Marchi; Elia Viviani | Italy | 4:08.726 | |
| 6 | Vivien Brisse; Julien Duval; Nicolas Giulia; Julien Morice | France | 4:08.839 | |
| 7 | Claudio Imhof; Kilian Moser; Loïc Perizzolo; Cyrille Thièry | Switzerland | 4:10.681 | |
| 8 | Volodymyr Diudia; Maksym Polishchuk; Mykhaylo Radionov; Vitaliy Shchedov | Ukraine | 4:11.039 | |
| 9 | Robert Bengsch; Henning Bommel; Marcel Kalz; Stefan Schäfer | Germany | 4:11.374 | |
| 10 | Dawid Glowacki; Adrian Kurek; Rafał Ratajczyk; Grzegorz Stępniak | Poland | 4:11.567 | |
| 11 | Jonathan Breyne; Moreno de Pauw; Ingmar de Poortere; Gijs van Hoecke | Belgium | 4:12.253 | |
| 12 | Martin Bláha; Jiří Hochmann; Milan Kadlec; Alois Kaňkovský | Czech Republic | 4:12.742 | |

== Finals ==
| Rank | Name | Nation | Time |
|---|---|---|---|
Gold Medal Race
| 1st place, gold medalist(s) | Steven Burke; Edward Clancy; Jason Queally; Andy Tennant | Great Britain | 4:00.482 |
| 2nd place, silver medalist(s) | Evgeny Kovalev; Ivan Kovalev; Alexei Markov; Alexander Serov | Russia | 4:04.274 |
Bronze Medal Race
| 3rd place, bronze medalist(s) | Levi Heimans; Arno van der Zwet; Tim Veldt; Sipke Zijlstra | Netherlands | 4:06.049 |
| 4 | Pablo Rosique; Unai Zubiaur; Asier Villalabeitia; David Juaneda | Spain | 4:08.099 |
