= Sipke Zijlstra =

Dutch track cyclist

Personal information
- Born: 13 April 1985 (age 41) Burgum

Cycling career
- Sport: Cycling
- Discipline: Track cycling
Medal record
Representing Netherlands
European Track Championships
Bronze medal – third place	2010 Pruszków	Team Pursuit

Sipke Zijlstra (born 13 April 1985) is a track cyclist from Netherlands. He participated in the team pursuit at the 2009 and 2010 UCI Track Cycling World Championships. In the under-23 category he won the bronze medal in the team pursuit at the 2007 UEC European Track Championships. In 2010 he won the bronze medal in the team pursuit at the 2010 UEC European Track Championships, together with Levi Heimans, Arno van der Zwet and Tim Veldt in Pruszków, Poland.
