= 2012 UCI Track Cycling World Championships – Women's 500 m time trial =

Rainbow jersey

The Women's time trial at the 2012 UCI Track Cycling World Championships was held on April 8. 23 athletes participated in the contest.

== Medalists ==
Gold	Anna Meares (AUS)
Silver	Miriam Welte (GER)
Bronze	Jessica Varnish (GBR)

== Results ==
The race was held at 19:30.

Rank	Name	Nation	Time	Notes
1st place, gold medalist(s)	Anna Meares	Australia	33.010	WR
2nd place, silver medalist(s)	Miriam Welte	Germany	33.626	
3rd place, bronze medalist(s)	Jessica Varnish	Great Britain	33.999	
4	Kaarle McCulloch	Australia	34.097	
5	Lee Wai Sze	Hong Kong	34.199	
6	Lisandra Guerra	Cuba	34.215	
7	Willy Kanis	Netherlands	34.280	
8	Sandie Clair	France	34.314	
9	Lyubov Shulika	Ukraine	34.358	
10	Gong Jinjie	China	34.438	
11	Zhong Tianshi	China	34.458	
12	Tania Calvo	Spain	34.614	
13	Elena Brezhniva	Russia	34.669	
14	Katie Schofield	New Zealand	34.927	
15	Anastasya Voynova	Russia	34.968	
16	Natasha Hansen	New Zealand	35.090	
17	Virginie Cueff	France	35.176	
18	Kayono Maeda	Japan	35.668	
19	Juliana Gaviria	Colombia	35.852	
20	Hsiao Mei Yu	Chinese Taipei	35.898	
21	Maryia Lohvinava	Belarus	36.018	
22	Gabriele Jankute	Lithuania	36.079	
23	Danielle King	Great Britain	36.153	
