= 2011 European Track Championships – Men's team sprint =

UEC European Champion jersey

The men's team sprint was held on 21 October 2011, with 10 teams participating.

== Medalists ==
Gold	Germany; René Enders; Robert Förstemann; Stefan Nimke
Silver	France; Mickaël Bourgain; François Pervis; Kévin Sireau
Bronze	Poland; Maciej Bielecki; Kamil Kuczyński; Damian Zieliński

== Results ==
=== Qualifying ===
The fastest two teams race for gold and 3rd and 4th teams race for bronze. It was held at 16:00.

Rank	Name	Nation	Time	Notes
1	Mickaël Bourgain; François Pervis; Kévin Sireau	France	44.636	Q
2	René Enders; Robert Förstemann; Stefan Nimke	Germany	44.663	Q
3	Maciej Bielecki; Kamil Kuczyński; Damian Zieliński	Poland	44.718	q
4	Roy van den Berg; Hugo Haak; Teun Mulder	Netherlands	44.816	q
5	Matthew Crampton; Chris Hoy; Jason Kenny	Great Britain	44.933	
6	Sergey Borisov; Denis Dmitriev; Sergey Kucherov	Russia	45.090	
7	David Alonso Castillo; Hodei Mazquiaran Uria; Juan Peralta Gascon	Spain	45.541	
8	Filip Ditzel; Pavel Kelemen; Denis Špička	Czech Republic	46.064	
9	Artem Frolov; Andrii Kutsenko; Andriy Vynokurov	Ukraine	46.317	
10	Balázs Juhász; Sándor Szalontay; Barnabás Tóth	Hungary	50.088	

== Finals ==
The final was held at 20:52.

Rank	Name	Nation	Time
Gold medal race
1st place, gold medalist(s)	René Enders; Robert Förstemann; Stefan Nimke	Germany	44.022
2nd place, silver medalist(s)	Mickaël Bourgain; François Pervis; Kévin Sireau	France	44.415
Bronze medal race
3rd place, bronze medalist(s)	Maciej Bielecki; Kamil Kuczyński; Damian Zieliński	Poland	44.809
4	Roy van den Berg; Hugo Haak; Teun Mulder	Netherlands	44.900
