= 2010 European Track Championships – Men's omnium =

UEC European Champion jersey

The Men's omnium was one of the 6 men's events at the 2010 European Track Championships, held in Pruszków, Poland.

21 cyclists participated in the contest. The race was held on November 6.

== Flying Lap ==
Rank	Name	Nation	Time	Notes
1	Ed Clancy	Great Britain	13.244	
2	Tim Veldt	Netherlands	13.267	
3	Jan Dostál	Czech Republic	13.502	
4	Roger Kluge	Germany	13.607	
5	Rafał Ratajczyk	Poland	13.611	
6	Elia Viviani	Italy	13.630	
7	David Juaneda	Spain	13.733	
8	Julien Duval	France	13.734	
9	Gijs van Hoecke	Belgium	13.745	
10	Martyn Irvine	Ireland	13.813	
11	Vitaliy Shchedov	Ukraine	13.951	
12	Ivan Kovalev	Russia	13.995	
13	Risto Aalito	Finland	14.093	
14	Eerik Idarand	Estonia	14.107	
15	Recep Ünalan	Turkey	14.111	
16	Tristan Marguet	Switzerland	14.114	
17	Gediminas Bagdonas	Lithuania	14.124	
18	Ioannis Tamoridis	Greece	14.146	
19	Krisztián Lovassy	Hungary	14.310	
20	Siarhei Sakavets	Belarus	14.408	
21	Andreas Graf	Austria	14.883	

== Points race 30 km ==
Rank	Name	Nation	Laps	Points
1	Ioannis Tamoridis	Greece	4	105
2	Rafał Ratajczyk	Poland	2	63
3	Ivan Kovalev	Russia	2	50
4	Gediminas Bagdonas	Lithuania	2	47
5	Roger Kluge	Germany	2	45
6	Andreas Graf	Austria	2	45
7	Tim Veldt	Netherlands	1	33
8	Martyn Irvine	Ireland	1	30
9	Elia Viviani	Italy	1	28
10	Tristan Marguet	Switzerland	1	24
11	David Juaneda	Spain	1	23
12	Julien Duval	France	1	23
13	Siarhei Sakavets	Belarus	1	21
14	Jan Dostál	Czech Republic	0	6
15	Ed Clancy	Great Britain	0	5
16	Gijs van Hoecke	Belgium	0	3
17	Vitaliy Shchedov	Ukraine	0	1
18	Recep Ünalan	Turkey	0	0
19	Eerik Idarand	Estonia	-1	DNF
19	Risto Aalito	Finland	-1	DNF
19	Krisztián Lovassy	Hungary	-1	DNF

== Elimination race ==
Rank	Name	Nation
1	Roger Kluge	Germany
2	Rafał Ratajczyk	Poland
3	Jan Dostál	Czech Republic
4	Tim Veldt	Netherlands
5	Ioannis Tamoridis	Greece
6	Elia Viviani	Italy
7	Andreas Graf	Austria
8	Vitaliy Shchedov	Ukraine
9	Ed Clancy	Great Britain
10	Tristan Marguet	Switzerland
11	Gijs van Hoecke	Belgium
12	Ivan Kovalev	Russia
13	Krisztián Lovassy	Hungary
14	Gediminas Bagdonas	Lithuania
15	Eerik Idarand	Estonia
16	Recep Ünalan	Turkey
17	Risto Aalito	Finland
18	Julien Duval	France
19	Martyn Irvine	Ireland
20	David Juaneda	Spain
21	Siarhei Sakavets	Belarus

== Individual Pursuit 4 km ==
Rank	Name	Nation	Time	Notes
1	Tim Veldt	Netherlands	4:26.000	
2	Roger Kluge	Germany	4:28.391	
3	Ed Clancy	Great Britain	4:30.045	
4	Martyn Irvine	Ireland	4:30.312	
5	Ioannis Tamoridis	Greece	4:31.259	
6	Vitaliy Shchedov	Ukraine	4:31.715	
7	Rafał Ratajczyk	Poland	4:32.062	
8	Gijs van Hoecke	Belgium	4:32.855	
9	David Juaneda	Spain	4:33.008	
10	Ivan Kovalev	Russia	4:33.078	
11	Elia Viviani	Italy	4:33.207	
12	Gediminas Bagdonas	Lithuania	4:34.842	
13	Julien Duval	France	4:35.617	
14	Jan Dostál	Czech Republic	4:38.031	
15	Tristan Marguet	Switzerland	4:43.077	
16	Eerik Idarand	Estonia	4:43.424	
17	Andreas Graf	Austria	4:43.872	
18	Siarhei Sakavets	Belarus	4:44.231	
19	Recep Ünalan	Turkey	4:45.777	
20	Krisztián Lovassy	Hungary	4:51.086	
21	Risto Aalito	Finland	4:52.813	

== Scratch race 15 km ==
Rank	Name	Nation	Laps down
1	Gijs van Hoecke	Belgium	
2	Ivan Kovalev	Russia	
3	Ed Clancy	Great Britain	
4	Ioannis Tamoridis	Greece	
5	Martyn Irvine	Ireland	
6	David Juaneda	Spain	
7	Roger Kluge	Germany	
8	Siarhei Sakavets	Belarus	-1
9	Rafał Ratajczyk	Poland	-1
10	Elia Viviani	Italy	-1
11	Jan Dostál	Czech Republic}	-1
12	Tristan Marguet	Switzerland	-1
13	Tim Veldt	Netherlands	-1
14	Julien Duval	France	-1
15	Andreas Graf	Austria	-1
16	Recep Ünalan	Turkey	-1
17	Vitaliy Shchedov	Ukraine	-1
18	Krisztián Lovassy	Hungary	-1
19	Gediminas Bagdonas	Lithuania	-1
20	Eerik Idarand	Estonia	-2
21	Risto Aalito	Finland	-2

== 1km time trial ==
Rank	Name	Nation	Time
1	Ed Clancy	Great Britain	1:02.690
2	Tim Veldt	Netherlands	1:03.170
3	Roger Kluge	Germany	1:04.321
4	Elia Viviani	Italy	1:04.341
5	Ivan Kovalev	Russia	1:04.624
6	Rafał Ratajczyk	Poland	1:05.232
7	Gijs van Hoecke	Belgium	1:05.240
8	Martyn Irvine	Ireland	1:05.401
9	Jan Dostál	Czech Republic	1:05.548
10	Gediminas Bagdonas	Lithuania	1:05.551
11	Julien Duval	France	1:05.908
12	David Juaneda	Spain	1:06.261
13	Recep Ünalan	Turkey	1:06.459
14	Tristan Marguet	Switzerland	1:06.595
15	Vitaliy Shchedov	Ukraine	1:06.632
16	Ioannis Tamoridis	Greece	1:06.707
17	Siarhei Sakavets	Belarus	1:07.850
18	Krisztián Lovassy	Hungary	1:07.888
19	Risto Aalito	Finland	1:08.031
20	Eerik Idarand	Estonia	1:08.715
21	Andreas Graf	Austria	1:10.417

== Final Classification ==
Rank	Name	Nation	Total
1st place, gold medalist(s)	Roger Kluge	Germany	22
2nd place, silver medalist(s)	Tim Veldt	Netherlands	29
3rd place, bronze medalist(s)	Rafał Ratajczyk	Poland	31
4	Ed Clancy	Great Britain	32
5	Ivan Kovalev	Russia	44
6	Elia Viviani	Italy	46
7	Ioannis Tamoridis	Greece	49
8	Gijs van Hoecke	Belgium	52
9	Martyn Irvine	Ireland	54
10	Jan Dostál	Czech Republic	54
11	David Juaneda	Spain	65
12	Vitaliy Shchedov	Ukraine	74
13	Gediminas Bagdonas	Lithuania	76
14	Julien Duval	France	76
15	Tristan Marguet	Switzerland	77
16	Andreas Graf	Austria	87
17	Recep Ünalan	Turkey	97
18	Siarhei Sakavets	Belarus	97
19	Eerik Idarand	Estonia	127
20	Krisztián Lovassy	Hungary	128
21	Risto Aalito	Finland	132
