= 2016 UEC European Track Championships – Women's points race =

Women's points race at the 2016 UEC European Track Championships
- UEC European Champion jersey
- Venue: Vélodrome de Saint-Quentin-en-Yvelines, Yvelines
- Date: 22 October
- Competitors: 18 from 18 nations

Medalists
gold medal	Kirsten Wild	Netherlands
silver medal	Jolien D'Hoore	Belgium
bronze medal	Katarzyna Pawłowska	Poland

The Women's points race was held on 22 October 2016. 18 riders participated over a distance of 25 km (100 laps), with sprints every 10 laps awarding 5, 3, 2 or 1 point to the first four (double in the final sprint); 20 points are also awarded/withdrawn for each lap gained/lost respectively.

== Results ==
Rank	Name	Nation	Sprint points	Lap points	Finish order	Total points
1st place, gold medalist(s)	Kirsten Wild	Netherlands(details)	19	0	2	25
2nd place, silver medalist(s)	Jolien D'Hoore	Belgium	14	0	1	24
3rd place, bronze medalist(s)	Katarzyna Pawłowska	Poland (details)	10	0	3	14
4	Charlotte Becker	Germany (details)	13	0	16	13
5	Elinor Barker	Great Britain (details)	11	0	10	11
6	Tatsiana Sharakova	Belarus	10	0	14	10
7	Maria Giulia Confalonieri	Italy	5	0	4	7
8	Élise Delzenne	France	7	0	7	7
9	Anna Nahirna	Ukraine	2	0	5	2
10	Jarmila Machačová	Czech Republic	2	0	11	2
11	Anita Stenberg	Norway	2	0	13	2
12	Edita Mazureviciute	Lithuania	2	0	15	2
13	Alžbeta Pavlendová	Slovakia	1	0	6	1
14	Gulnaz Badykova	Russia	1	0	9	1
15	Lydia Gurley	Ireland	0	0	8	0
16	Verena Eberhardt	Austria	0	0	12	0
17	Sheyla Ruiz	Spain	0	0	17	0
–	Sara Ferrara	Finland	0	−20	0	DNF
