= 2011 European Track Championships – Men's omnium =

Athletic competition

UEC European Champion jersey

The Men's omnium was held on 22–23 October 2011. 18 riders participated over six competitions.

== Medalists ==
Gold	Ed Clancy (GBR)
Silver	Bryan Coquard (FRA)
Bronze	Elia Viviani (ITA)

== Results ==
=== Flying lap ===
The flying lap was held at 14:40.

Rank	Name	Nation	Time	Notes
1	Ed Clancy	Great Britain	13.420	
2	Bryan Coquard	France	13.457	
3	Alois Kaňkovský	Czech Republic	13.522	
4	Elia Viviani	Italy	13.547	
5	Recep Ünalan	Turkey	13.597	
6	Roger Kluge	Germany	13.672	
7	Gijs van Hoecke	Belgium	13.703	
8	Martyn Irvine	Ireland	13.712	
9	Lasse Hansen	Denmark	13.754	
10	Ivan Kovalev	Russia	13.779	
11	Eloy Teruel	Spain	13.792	
12	Jenning Huizenga	Netherlands	13.864	
13	Rafał Ratajczyk	Poland	13.911	
14	Polychronis Tzortzakis	Greece	14.189	
15	Olivier Beer	Switzerland	14.189	
16	Aliaksandr Lisouski	Belarus	14.274	
17	Eerik Idarand	Estonia	14.352	
18	Volodymyr Diudia	Ukraine	14.426	

=== Points race ===
The race was held at 16:44.

Rank	Name	Nation	Laps	Points
1	Eloy Teruel	Spain	2	58
2	Rafał Ratajczyk	Poland	1	32
3	Elia Viviani	Italy	1	27
4	Roger Kluge	Germany	1	24
5	Ivan Kovalev	Russia	1	23
6	Lasse Hansen	Denmark	0	17
7	Bryan Coquard	France	0	14
8	Martyn Irvine	Ireland	0	12
9	Gijs van Hoecke	Belgium	0	11
10	Ed Clancy	Great Britain	0	9
11	Recep Ünalan	Turkey	0	8
12	Jenning Huizenga	Netherlands	0	7
13	Olivier Beer	Switzerland	0	5
14	Aliaksandr Lisouski	Belarus	0	4
15	Volodymyr Diudia	Ukraine	0	1
16	Polychronis Tzortzakis	Greece	0	0
17	Alois Kaňkovský	Czech Republic	−1	−20
–	Eerik Idarand	Estonia	−2	DNF

=== Elimination race ===
The race was held at 20:24.

Rank	Name	Nation
1	Bryan Coquard	France
2	Elia Viviani	Italy
3	Alois Kaňkovský	Czech Republic
4	Rafał Ratajczyk	Poland
5	Recep Ünalan	Turkey
6	Ed Clancy	Great Britain
7	Roger Kluge	Germany
8	Martyn Irvine	Ireland
9	Eloy Teruel	Spain
10	Polychronis Tzortzakis	Greece
11	Olivier Beer	Switzerland
12	Gijs van Hoecke	Belgium
13	Ivan Kovalev	Russia
14	Lasse Hansen	Denmark
15	Jenning Huizenga	Netherlands
16	Volodymyr Diudia	Ukraine
17	Aliaksandr Lisouski	Belarus
18	Eerik Idarand	Estonia

=== Individual Pursuit ===
The race was held at 11:50.

Rank	Name	Nation	Time	Notes
1	Lasse Hansen	Denmark	4:28.233	
2	Eloy Teruel	Spain	4:28.570	
3	Jenning Huizenga	Netherlands	4:28.579	
4	Rafał Ratajczyk	Poland	4:29.046	
5	Ivan Kovalev	Russia	4:30.948	
6	Martyn Irvine	Ireland	4:32.542	
7	Roger Kluge	Germany	4:32.699	
8	Ed Clancy	Great Britain	4:32.858	
9	Elia Viviani	Italy	4:33.830	
10	Volodymyr Diudia	Ukraine	4:35.139	
11	Alois Kaňkovský	Czech Republic	4:37.119	
12	Recep Ünalan	Turkey	4:37.490	
13	Olivier Beer	Switzerland	4:37.776	
14	Aliaksandr Lisouski	Belarus	4:38.798	
15	Bryan Coquard	France	4:42.373	
16	Polychronis Tzortzakis	Greece	4:50.114	
17	Eerik Idarand	Estonia	4:56.732	
–	Gijs van Hoecke	Belgium		DNF

=== Scratch race ===
The race was held at 15:46.

Rank	Name	Nation	Laps down
1	Martyn Irvine	Ireland	
2	Volodymyr Diudia	Ukraine	−1
3	Lasse Hansen	Denmark	−1
4	Jenning Huizenga	Netherlands	−1
5	Ivan Kovalev	Russia	−1
6	Bryan Coquard	France	−1
7	Ed Clancy	Great Britain	−1
8	Recep Ünalan	Turkey	−1
9	Eloy Teruel	Spain	−1
10	Elia Viviani	Italy	−1
11	Roger Kluge	Germany	−1
12	Rafał Ratajczyk	Poland	−1
13	Olivier Beer	Switzerland	−1
14	Aliaksandr Lisouski	Belarus	−1
–	Alois Kaňkovský	Czech Republic	DNF
–	Eerik Idarand	Estonia	DNF
–	Polychronis Tzortzakis	Greece	DNF

=== 1km time trial ===
The race was held at 18:26.

Rank	Name	Nation	Time
1	Ed Clancy	Great Britain	1:02.304
2	Bryan Coquard	France	1:03.838
3	Alois Kaňkovský	Czech Republic	1:04.034
4	Lasse Hansen	Denmark	1:04.283
5	Ivan Kovalev	Russia	1:04.585
6	Roger Kluge	Germany	1:04.601
7	Elia Viviani	Italy	1:04.635
8	Martyn Irvine	Ireland	1:04.697
9	Recep Ünalan	Turkey	1:04.727
10	Rafał Ratajczyk	Poland	1:04.838
11	Olivier Beer	Switzerland	1:05.528
12	Volodymyr Diudia	Ukraine	1:06.114
13	Jenning Huizenga	Netherlands	1:06.357
14	Eloy Teruel	Spain	1:06.443
15	Aliaksandr Lisouski	Belarus	1:06.485
16	Polychronis Tzortzakis	Greece	1:07.299
17	Eerik Idarand	Estonia	1:08.835

== Final Classification ==
After six events.

Rank	Name	Nation	Total
1st place, gold medalist(s)	Ed Clancy	Great Britain	33
2nd place, silver medalist(s)	Bryan Coquard	France	33
3rd place, bronze medalist(s)	Elia Viviani	Italy	35
4	Lasse Hansen	Denmark	37
5	Martyn Irvine	Ireland	39
6	Roger Kluge	Germany	41
7	Ivan Kovalev	Russia	43
8	Rafał Ratajczyk	Poland	45
9	Eloy Teruel	Spain	46
10	Recep Ünalan	Turkey	50
11	Jenning Huizenga	Netherlands	59
12	Alois Kaňkovský	Czech Republic	70
13	Volodymyr Diudia	Ukraine	73
14	Olivier Beer	Switzerland	76
15	Aliaksandr Lisouski	Belarus	90
16	Polychronis Tzortzakis	Greece	105
17	Eerik Idarand	Estonia	138
–	Gijs van Hoecke	Belgium	DNF
