= 2008 UEC European Track Championships – Women's under-23 sprint =

UEC European Champion jersey

The Women's Sprint was one of the 8 women's events at the 2008 European Track Championships, held in Pruszków, Poland.

11 cyclists participated in the contest.

The race was held on September 6.

== Final results ==
Rank	Name	Nation
1	Miriam Welte	Germany
2	Lyubov Shulika	Ukraine
3	Anna Blyth	United Kingdom
4	Sandie Clair	France
5	Virginie Cueff	France
6	Olga Streltsova	Russia
7	Renata Dąbrowska	Poland
8	Helena Casas Roige	Spain
9	Yulia Kosheleva	Russia
10	Marta Janowiak	Poland
11	Angeliki Koutsonikoli	Greece
