= 2012 European Track Championships – Men's team sprint =

UEC European Champion jersey

The Men's team sprint was held on 19 October 2012. 11 nations participated.

== Medalists ==
Gold	Germany; Tobias Wächter; Joachim Eilers; Max Niederlag
Silver	Poland; Kamil Kuczyński; Maciej Bielecki; Krzysztof Maksel
Bronze	Great Britain; Matthew Crampton; Callum Skinner; Lewis Oliva

== Results ==
Fastest 2 teams raced for gold and 3rd and 4th teams raced for bronze.

=== Qualifying ===
It was held at 14:35.

Rank	Name	Nation	Time	Notes
1	Tobias Wächter; Joachim Eilers; Max Niederlag	Germany	44.892	Q
2	Kamil Kuczyński; Maciej Bielecki; Krzysztof Maksel	Poland	45.078	Q
3	Matthew Crampton; Callum Skinner; Lewis Oliva	Great Britain	45.221	q
4	Sergey Kucherov; Denis Dmitriev; Nikita Shurhsin	Russia	45.293	q
5	Adam Ptáčník; Tomáš Bábek; Pavel Kelemen	Czech Republic	45.541	
6	Hylke van Grieken; Rigard van Klooster; Matthijs Büchli	Netherlands	46.007	
7	Christos Volikakis; Sotirios Bretas; Ioannis Kalogeropoulos	Greece	46.163	
8	Juhani Tammisto; Jani Mikkonen; Wille-Oskari Riihela	Finland	49.326	
–	Siamen Zaikouski; Vladislav Novik; Evgeni Veremchuk	Belarus		REL
–	Artem Frolov; Andriy Kutsenko; Andrii Sach	Ukraine		REL
–	Charlie Conord; Julien Palma; Benjamin Edelin	France		REL

=== Finals ===
The finals were held at 20:22.

Rank	Name	Nation	Time
Gold Medal Race
1st place, gold medalist(s)	Tobias Wächter; Joachim Eilers; Max Niederlag	Germany	44.381
2nd place, silver medalist(s)	Kamil Kuczyński; Maciej Bielecki; Krzysztof Maksel	Poland	44.892
Bronze Medal Race
3rd place, bronze medalist(s)	Matthew Crampton; Callum Skinner; Lewis Oliva	Great Britain	45.081
4	Sergey Kucherov; Denis Dmitriev; Nikita Shurhsin	Russia	REL
