= 2011 European Track Championships – Men's points race =

UEC European Champion jersey

The Men's points race was held on 21 October 2011. 28 riders participated, the distance was 40 km (160 laps) with a sprint every 10 laps for extra points. A lap would have gotten 20 points. Two heats were held over 20 km to determine the final riders.

== Medalists ==
Gold	Rafał Ratajczyk (POL)
Silver	Silvan Dillier (SUI)
Bronze	Milan Kadlec (CZE)

== Results ==
=== Heats ===
The races were held at 16:20. The top 10 riders of each heat advanced to the final.

==== Heat 1 ====
Rank	Name	Nation	Sprint points	Lap points	Total points
1	David Muntaner Juaneda	Spain	9	0	9
2	Kevin Labeque	France	7	0	7
3	Milan Kadlec	Czech Republic	6	0	6
4	Moreno Depauw	Belgium	5	0	5
5	Adam Stachowiak	Poland	4	0	4
6	Silvan Dillier	Switzerland	2	0	2
7	Andreas Graf	Austria	2	0	2
8	David O'Loughlin	Ireland	1	0	1
9	Wouter Haan	Netherlands	−6	−20	−26
10	Lucas Liss	Germany	−8	−20	−28
11	Aliaksandr Lisouski	Belarus	−9	−20	−29
12	Mathias Møller Nielsen	Denmark	−12	−20	−32
13	Sergiy Lagkuti	Ukraine	−14	−20	−34
14	Michele Scartezzini	Italy	−19	−20	−39

==== Heat 2 ====
Rank	Name	Nation	Sprint points	Lap points	Total points
1	Ioannis Tamouridis	Greece	27	20	47
2	Rafał Ratajczyk	Poland	8	0	8
3	Ivan Savitskiy	Russia	7	0	7
4	Sebastián Mora Vedri	Spain	6	0	6
5	Marcel Kalz	Germany	6	0	6
6	Loïc Perizzolo	Switzerland	5	0	5
7	Mykhaylo Radionov	Ukraine	4	0	4
8	Angelo Ciccone	Italy	3	0	3
9	Andreas Müller	Austria	1	0	1
10	Marek Mixa	Czech Republic	−4	−20	−24
11	Yauheni Shamsanou	Belarus	−9	−20	−29
12	Justin van Hoecke	Belgium	−11	−20	−31
13	Roy Eefting	Netherlands	−15	−20	−35
14	Eerik Idarand	Estonia	−40	−20	−60

=== Final ===
The final was held at 21:49.

Rank	Name	Nation	Sprint points	Lap points	Total points
1st place, gold medalist(s)	Rafał Ratajczyk	Poland	23	20	43
2nd place, silver medalist(s)	Silvan Dillier	Switzerland	19	20	39
3rd place, bronze medalist(s)	Milan Kadlec	Czech Republic	16	20	36
4	Sebastián Mora Vedri	Spain	10	20	30
5	Andreas Graf	Austria	6	20	26
6	Mykhaylo Radionov	Ukraine	4	20	24
7	Ivan Savitskiy	Russia	13	0	13
8	Ioannis Tamouridis	Greece	12	0	12
9	Angelo Ciccone	Italy	12	0	12
10	Marcel Kalz	Germany	11	0	11
11	David Muntaner Juaneda	Spain	8	0	8
12	Lucas Liss	Germany	7	0	7
13	Andreas Müller	Austria	6	0	6
14	David O'Loughlin	Ireland	5	0	5
15	Kevin Labeque	France	4	0	4
16	Adam Stachowiak	Poland	4	0	4
17	Wouter Haan	Netherlands	4	0	4
18	Loïc Perizzolo	Switzerland	1	0	1
–	Moreno Depauw	Belgium	−10	−20	DNF
–	Marek Mixa	Czech Republic	1	0	DNF
