= Iryna Papezhuk =

Ukrainian cyclist

Personal information
- Born: 26 July 1986 (age 40)

Cycling career
- Sport: Cycling
- Discipline: Track cycling
- Role: Rider
- Rider type: sprinter

Iryna Papezhuk (born 26 July 1986) is a Ukrainian female track cyclist. She competed in the sprint and team sprint event at the 2012 UCI Track Cycling World Championships.
