= Damian Zieliński =

Polish cyclist

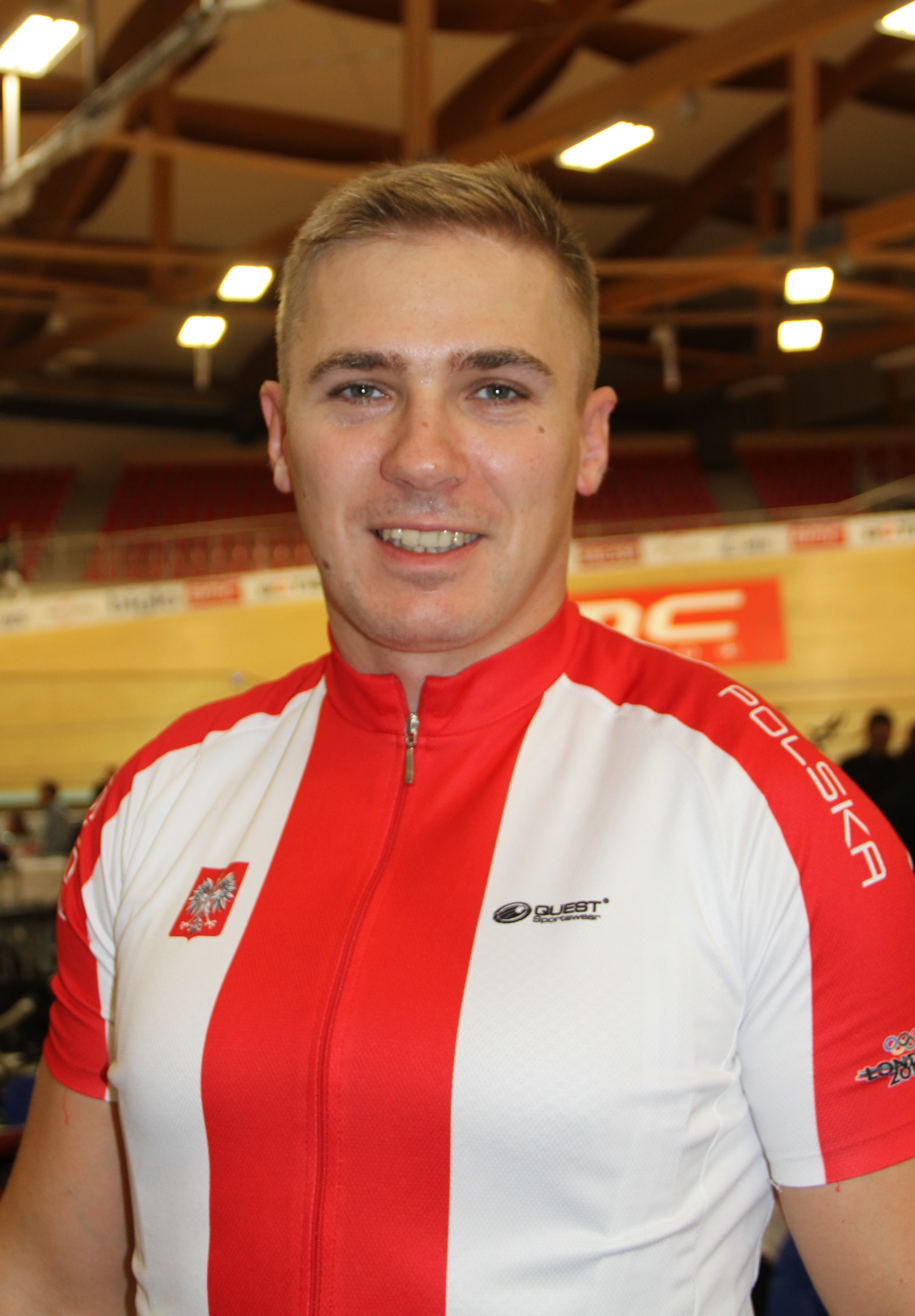
- Zieliński at the 2015 UEC European Track Championships

Personal information
- Full name: Damian Zieliński
- Born: 2 December 1981 (age 44) Szczecin, Poland

Cycling career
- Sport: Cycling
- Discipline: Track
- Role: Rider
- Rider type: Sprinter
Medal record
Representing Poland
Men's track cycling
European Elite Championships
Silver medal – second place	2014 Baie-Mahault	Sprint
Bronze medal – third place	2011 Apeldoorn	Team Sprint
Bronze medal – third place	2015 Grenchen	Sprint

Damian Zieliński (born 2 December 1981) is a Polish cyclist. He was born in Szczecin. He competed at the 2004 Summer Olympics in Athens, and at the 2012 Summer Olympics in London.
