= Arno van der Zwet =

Dutch cyclist

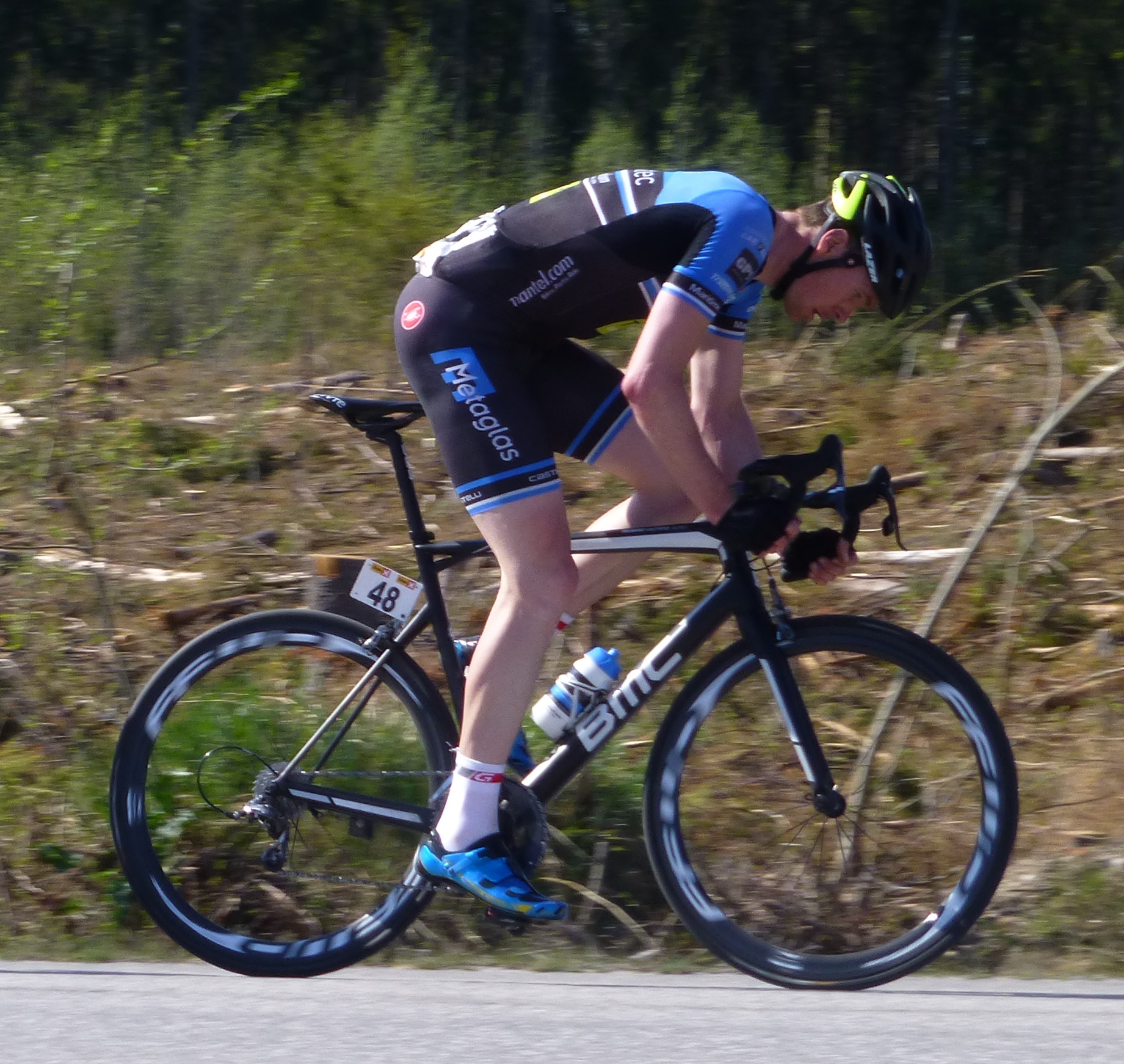

Personal information
- Born: 7 May 1986 (age 40) Heerhugowaard, Netherlands

Cycling career
- Sport: Cycling
- Disciplines: Track; Road
- Role: Rider

Amateur team
- 2007–2009: Ruiter–Dakkapellen

Professional teams
- 2009–2014: Koga–CreditForce
- 2015–2016: Metec–TKH
Medal record
Representing Netherlands
European Track Championships
Bronze medal – third place	2010 Pruszków	Team pursuit

Arno van der Zwet (born 7 May 1986) is a Dutch former track and road cyclist. In 2010 he won the bronze medal in the team pursuit at the 2010 UEC European Track Championships in Pruszków, Poland.

== Major results ==
2007
2nd ZLM Tour
2010
3rd Team pursuit, UEC European Track Championships
2013
3rd Overall Olympia's Tour

1st Stage 2

9th Overall Tour du Loir-et-Cher
2015
4th Skive–Løbet
6th Arno Wallaard Memorial
