= Maciej Bielecki =

Polish cyclist (born 1987)

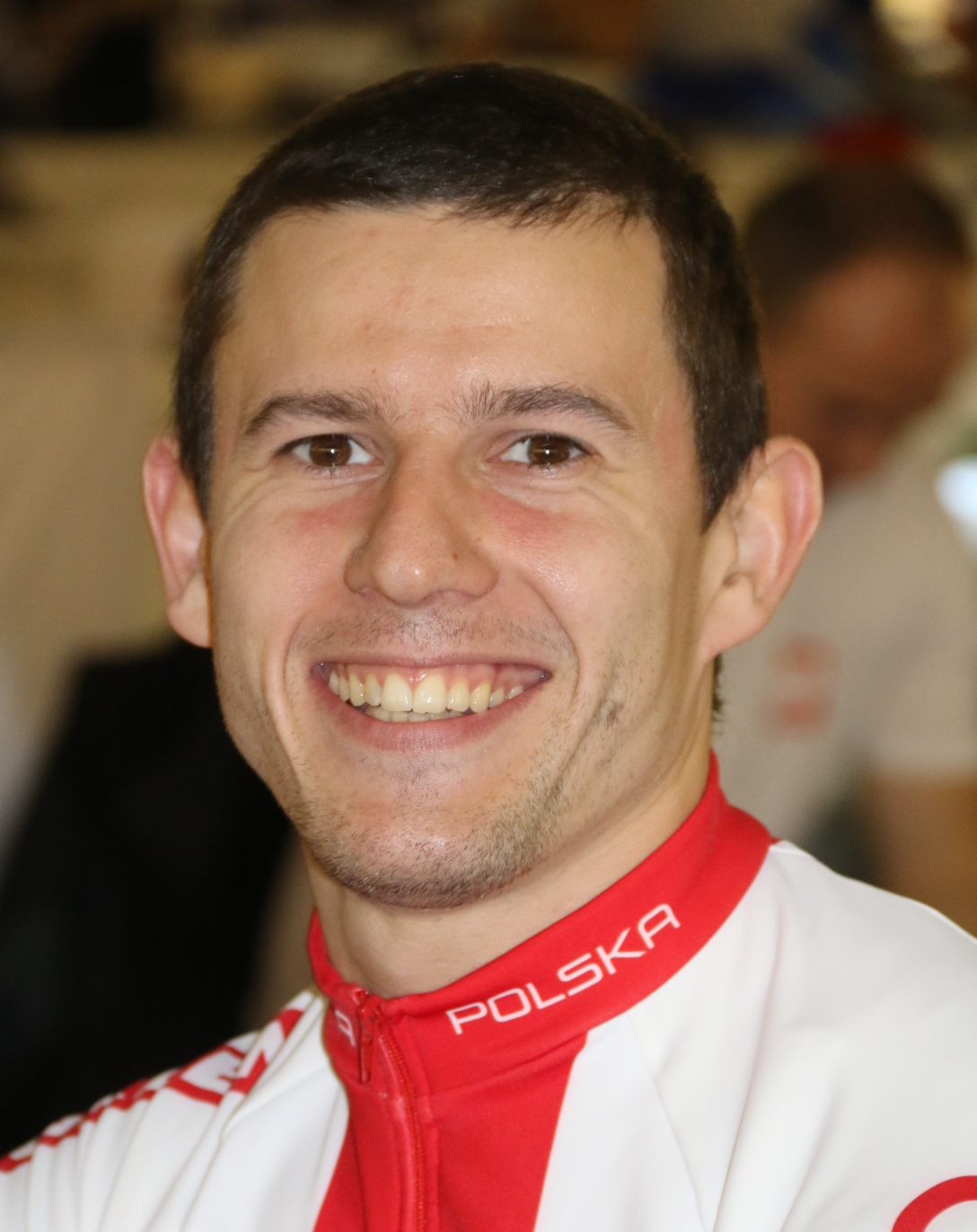
- Maciej Bielecki (2017)

Personal information
- Full name: Maciej Bielecki
- Born: 19 May 1987 (age 39) Białystok, Poland

Cycling career
- Sport: Cycling
- Discipline: Track
- Role: Rider
- Rider type: Sprinter
Medal record
Men's track cycling
Representing Poland
European Championships
Gold medal – first place	2016 Yvelines	Team sprint
Silver medal – second place	2012 Panevėžys	Team sprint
Bronze medal – third place	2011 Apeldoorn	Team sprint
Bronze medal – third place	2021 Grenchen	Team sprint
Bronze medal – third place	2024 Apeldoorn	Team sprint

Maciej Bielecki (born 19 May 1987) is a Polish track cyclist. He was born in Białystok. He competed at the 2008 Summer Olympics in Beijing, and at the 2012 Summer Olympics in London in the men's team sprint.
