= 2011 UEC European Track Championships =

- Venue: Apeldoorn, Netherlands
- Date: 21–23 October 2011
- Velodrome: Omnisport Apeldoorn
- Events: 13

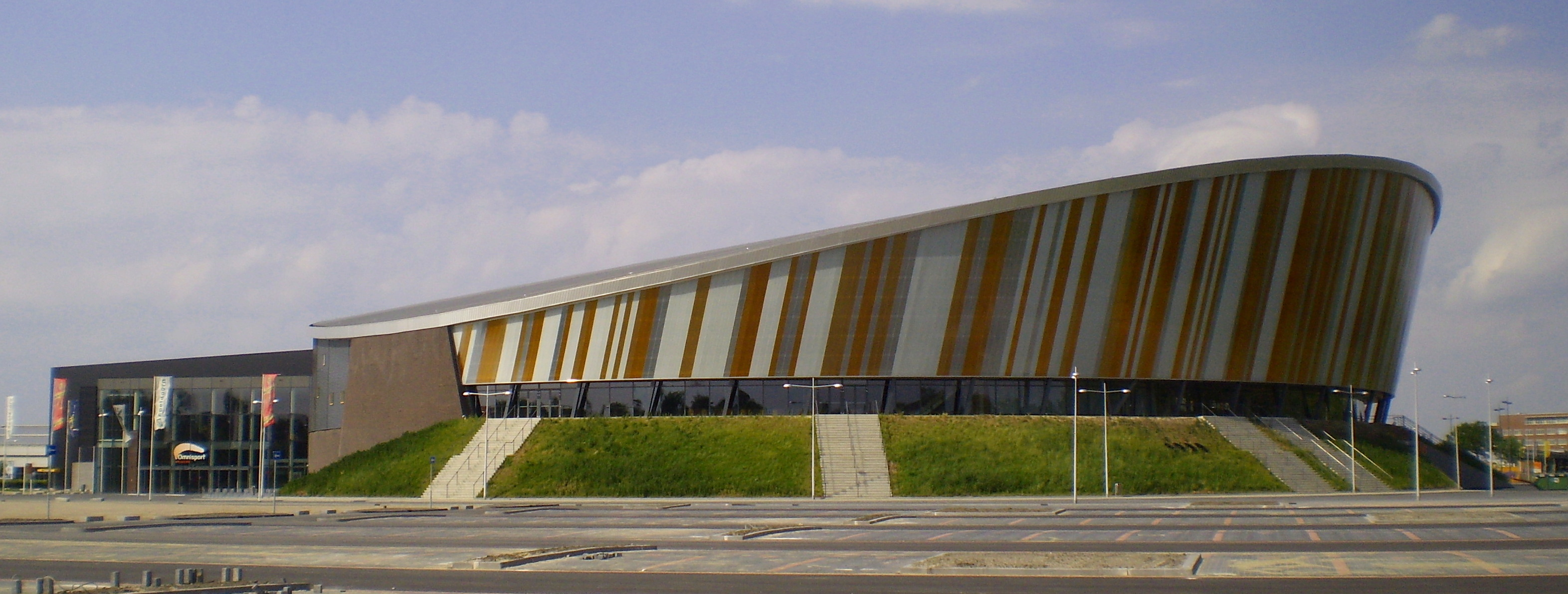
Omnisport Apeldoorn

The 2011 European Track Championships was the second edition of the elite European Track Championships in track cycling and took place at the Omnisport Arena in Apeldoorn, Netherlands, between 21 and 23 October.

All ten Olympic events, (sprint, team sprint, keirin, team pursuit and omnium all for both men and women) and the non-Olympic men's madison championship and points races for both genders were held as part of the championships. The Championships were a qualification event for the 2012 Olympic Games.

The opening night of competition was marred by technical difficulties, specifically the mechanical breakdown of the fixed gates system. as a result of which all releases reverted to hand or manual releases. This mechanical difficulty caused two German false starts in the Women's Team Pursuit final, and may have played some part in the shock failure of Great Britain to make the medal finals in the Men's Team Sprint event.

Despite this latter mishap, and the early withdrawal of Sir Chris Hoy with illness, the event was dominated by Great Britain, winning seven golds from the ten Olympic events, despite failing to medal in either individual sprint event.

== Events ==
Event	Gold		Silver		Bronze	
Men's events
Sprint	Kévin Sireau; France		Maximilian Levy; Germany		Denis Dmitriev; Russia	
Team sprint	René Enders; Robert Förstemann; Stefan Nimke; Germany	44.022	Mickaël Bourgain; François Pervis; Kévin Sireau; France	44.415	Maciej Bielecki; Kamil Kuczyński; Damian Zieliński; Poland	44.809
Keirin	Matthew Crampton; Great Britain		Christos Volikakis; Greece		François Pervis; France	
Omnium	Ed Clancy (w); Great Britain	33 pts	Bryan Coquard; France	33 pts	Elia Viviani; Italy	35
Team pursuit	Steven Burke; Ed Clancy; Peter Kennaugh; Andy Tennant; Geraint Thomas (q); Great Britain	4:00.008	Michael Mørkøv; Casper Folsach; Lasse Norman Hansen; Rasmus Quaade; Denmark	4:06.787	Valery Kaykov; Evgeny Kovalev; Ivan Kovalev; Victor Manakov; Russia	4:04.508
Points race non-Olympic	Rafał Ratajczyk; Poland	43 +1 lap	Silvan Dillier; Switzerland	39 +1 lap	Milan Kadlec; Czech Republic	36 +1 lap
Madison	Kenny De Ketele; Iljo Keisse; Belgium		Claudio Imhof; Cyrille Thièry; Switzerland		Vivien Brisse; Morgan Kneisky; France	
Women's events
Sprint	Lyubov Shulika; Ukraine		Olga Panarina; Belarus		Viktoria Baranova; Russia	
Team sprint	Victoria Pendleton; Jessica Varnish; Great Britain	33.276	Lyubov Shulika; Olena Tsyos; Ukraine	33.786	Kristina Vogel; Miriam Welte; Germany	33.678
Keirin	Victoria Pendleton; Great Britain		Clara Sanchez; France		Sandie Clair; France	
Omnium	Laura Trott; Great Britain	25 pts	Tatsiana Sharakova; Belarus	29 pts	Kirsten Wild; Netherlands	32 pts
Team pursuit	Dani King; Joanna Rowsell; Laura Trott; Great Britain	3:22.618	Charlotte Becker; Lisa Brennauer; Madeleine Sandig; Germany	3:29.596	Alena Dylko; Aksana Papko; Tatsiana Sharakova; Belarus	3:26.864
Points race non-Olympic	Evgenia Romanyuta; Russia	19	Katarzyna Pawłowska; Poland	14	Jarmila Machačová; Czech Republic	13

- q = rode in qualification round only.
- w = won on countback
- shaded events are non-Olympic

== Medal table ==
Rank	Nation	Gold	Silver	Bronze	Total
1	Great Britain (GBR)	7	0	0	7
2	France (FRA)	1	3	3	7
3	Germany (GER)	1	2	1	4
4	Poland (POL)	1	1	1	3
5	Ukraine (UKR)	1	1	0	2
6	Russia (RUS)	1	0	3	4
7	Belgium (BEL)	1	0	0	1
8	Belarus (BLR)	0	2	1	3
9	Switzerland (SUI)	0	2	0	2
10	Denmark (DEN)	0	1	0	1
10	Greece (GRE)	0	1	0	1
12	Czech Republic (CZE)	0	0	2	2
13	Italy (ITA)	0	0	1	1
13	Netherlands (NED)	0	0	1	1
Totals (14 entries)		13	13	13	39

== Participating nations ==
23 nations participated.

- Austria
- Belarus
- Belgium
- Czech Republic
- Denmark
- Estonia
- Finland
- France
- Germany
- Great Britain
- Greece
- Hungary
- Ireland
- Italy
- Lithuania
- Netherlands, see: Netherlands at the 2011 European Track Championships
- Poland
- Russia
- Slovakia
- Spain
- Switzerland
- Turkey
- Ukraine
