= 2023 UEC European Track Championships – Women's scratch =

Women's scratch at the 2023 UEC European Track Championships
- Venue: Tissot Velodrome, Grenchen
- Date: 8 February
- Competitors: 19 from 19 nations

Medalists
gold medal	Maria Martins	Portugal
silver medal	Eukene Larrarte	Spain
bronze medal	Daria Pikulik	Poland

The women's scratch competition at the 2023 UEC European Track Championships was held on 8 February 2023.

== Results ==
First rider across the line without a net lap loss wins.

Rank	Name	Nation	Laps down
1st place, gold medalist(s)	Maria Martins	Portugal	
2nd place, silver medalist(s)	Eukene Larrarte	Spain	
3rd place, bronze medalist(s)	Daria Pikulik	Poland	
4	Maike van der Duin	Netherlands	
5	Martina Fidanza	Italy	
6	Ella Barnwell	Great Britain	
7	Petra Ševčíková	Czech Republic	
8	Anita Stenberg	Norway	
9	Shari Bossuyt	Belgium	
10	Clara Copponi	France	
11	Argiro Milaki	Greece	
12	Alice Sharpe	Ireland	
13	Olivija Baleišytė	Lithuania	
14	Alžbeta Bačíková	Slovakia	
15	Anna Kolyzhuk	Ukraine	
16	Lena Charlotte Reißner	Germany	
17	Verena Eberhardt	Austria	
18	Léna Mettraux	Switzerland	
19	Zsuzsanna Kercsó-Magos	Hungary	DNF
