= Levi Heimans =

Dutch cyclist (born 1985)

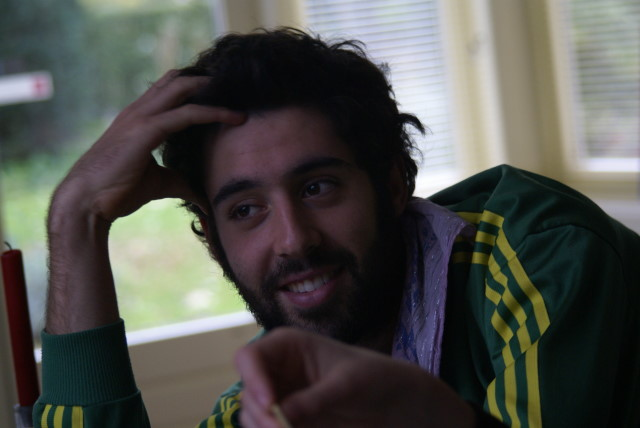

Personal information
- Full name: Levi Heimans
- Born: 24 July 1985 (age 41) Diemen, the Netherlands

Cycling career
- Sport: Cycling
- Discipline: Track
- Role: Rider
- Rider type: Endurance
Medal record
Representing the Netherlands
Men's track cycling
European Championships
Bronze medal – third place	2010 Pruszków	Team pursuit

Levi Heimans (born 24 July 1985 in Diemen, North Holland) is a Dutch track cyclist.

Heimans represented the Netherlands at the 2004 Summer Olympics in Athens where he took part in the 4 km team pursuit together with Jens Mouris, Peter Schep and Jeroen Straathof. They ended up in fifth position. He was also qualified for the individual pursuit but decided to focus totally on the team effort and did not start in that race. He competed in the same event at the 2008 and 2012 Summer Olympics, finishing 5th again and then 7th.

== Palmarès ==
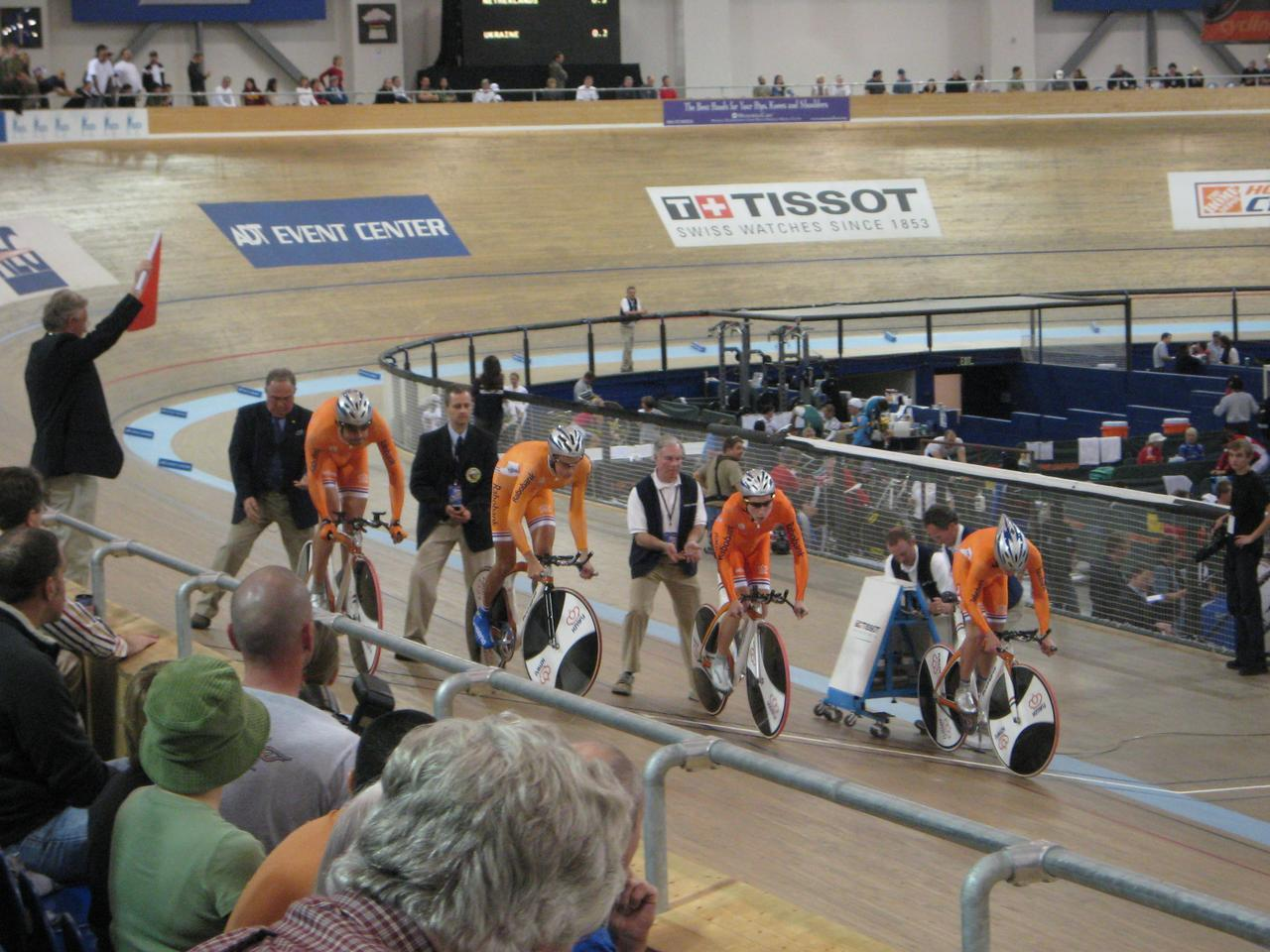
Levi Heimans in the team pursuit at the 2007-08 Track Cycling World Cup in Los Angeles

2008
3rd 2008 Dutch National Track Championships, Individual pursuit
2009
1st 2009 Dutch National Track Championships, Individual pursuit
2010
3rd 2010 European Track Championships, Team pursuit
1st 2010 Dutch National Track Championships, Individual pursuit
2011
2nd 2011 Dutch National Track Championships, Individual pursuit

== See also ==
- List of Dutch Olympic cyclists
