= Kamil Kuczyński =

Polish cyclist

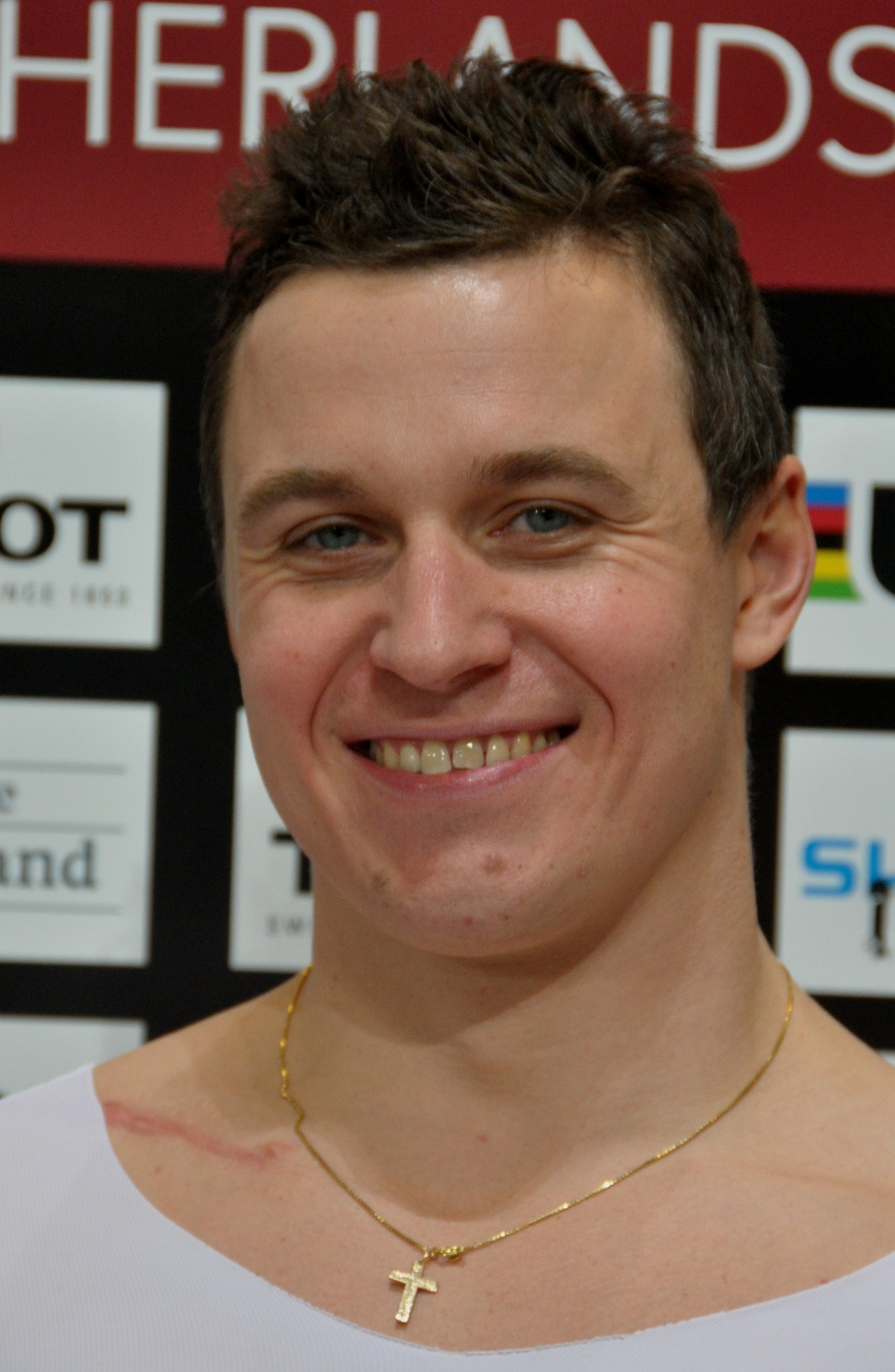
- Kamil Kuczyński (2016)

Personal information
- Full name: Kamil Kuczyński
- Born: 23 March 1985 (age 41) Płock, Poland

Cycling career
- Sport: Cycling
- Discipline: Track
- Role: Rider
- Rider type: Sprinter
Medal record
Men's track cycling
Representing Poland
European Track Championships
Gold medal – first place	2016 Saint-Quentin-en-Yvelines	Team sprint
Silver medal – second place	2012 Panevėžys	Team sprint
Bronze medal – third place	2011 Apeldoorn	Team sprint

Kamil Kuczyński (born 23 March 1985) is a Polish cyclist. He was born in Płock. He competed at the 2008 Summer Olympics in Beijing, and at the 2012 Summer Olympics in London.
