= Evgeny Kovalev =

Russian cyclist

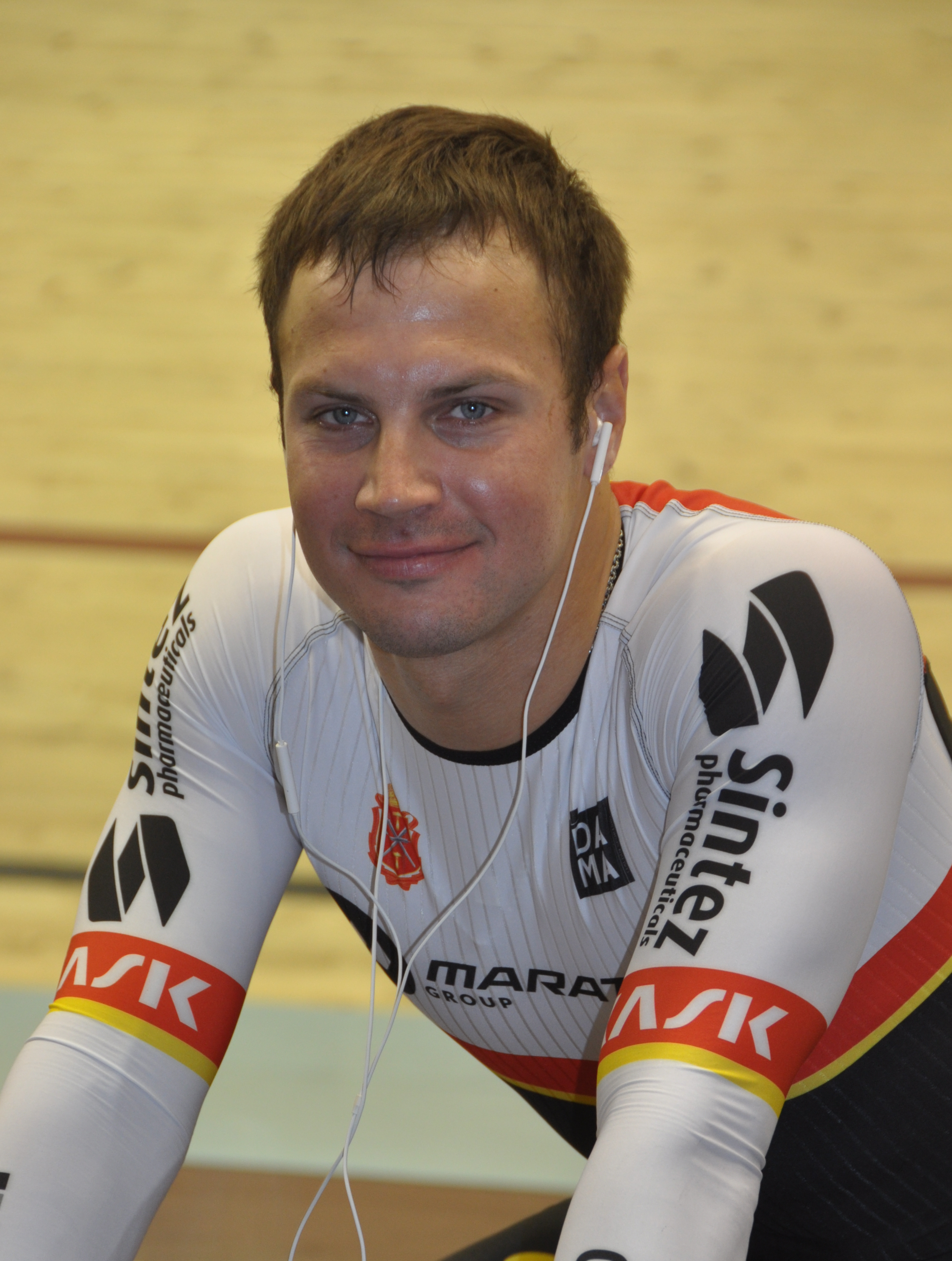
- Kovalev in 2018

Personal information
- Born: 6 March 1989 (age 37) Moscow, Russia

Cycling career
- Sport: Cycling
- Disciplines: Track and road
- Role: Rider
- Rider type: Track: endurance

Professional teams
- 2011: Itera–Katusha
- 2012–2013: RusVelo
- 2014: Russian Helicopters
Medal record
Men's track cycling
Representing Russia
World Championships
Silver medal – second place	2011 Apeldoorn	Team pursuit
European Championships
Silver medal – second place	2010 Pruszków	Team pursuit
Silver medal – second place	2013 Apeldoorn	Team pursuit
Bronze medal – third place	2011 Apeldoorn	Team pursuit

Evgeny Kovalev (born 6 March 1989 in Moscow) is a Russian professional cyclist, who last competed with the Russian Helicopters squad. At the 2012 Summer Olympics, he competed in the Men's team pursuit for the national team. His brother Ivan Kovalev is also a racing cyclist.

== Palmarès ==
2009
1st Stage 2 Bałtyk–Karkonosze Tour
8th Tour of Vojvodina II
10th Trofeo Banca Popolare di Vicenza
2010
1st Stage 3 Grand Prix of Adygeya
2013
1st Stage 1 Vuelta Ciclista a Costa Rica
2014
1st Stage 5 Grand Prix Udmurtskaya Pravda
