= Artem Frolov =

Ukrainian cyclist

Personal information
- Born: 21 February 1988 (age 38)

Cycling career
- Sport: Cycling
- Discipline: Track cycling
- Role: Rider
- Rider type: sprinter

Artem Frolov (Ukrainian: Артем Фролов; born 21 February 1988) is a Ukrainian male track cyclist, riding for the national team. He competed in the team sprint event at the 2010 UCI Track Cycling World Championships.
