= Andriy Kutsenko =

Ukrainian cyclist (1989–2024)

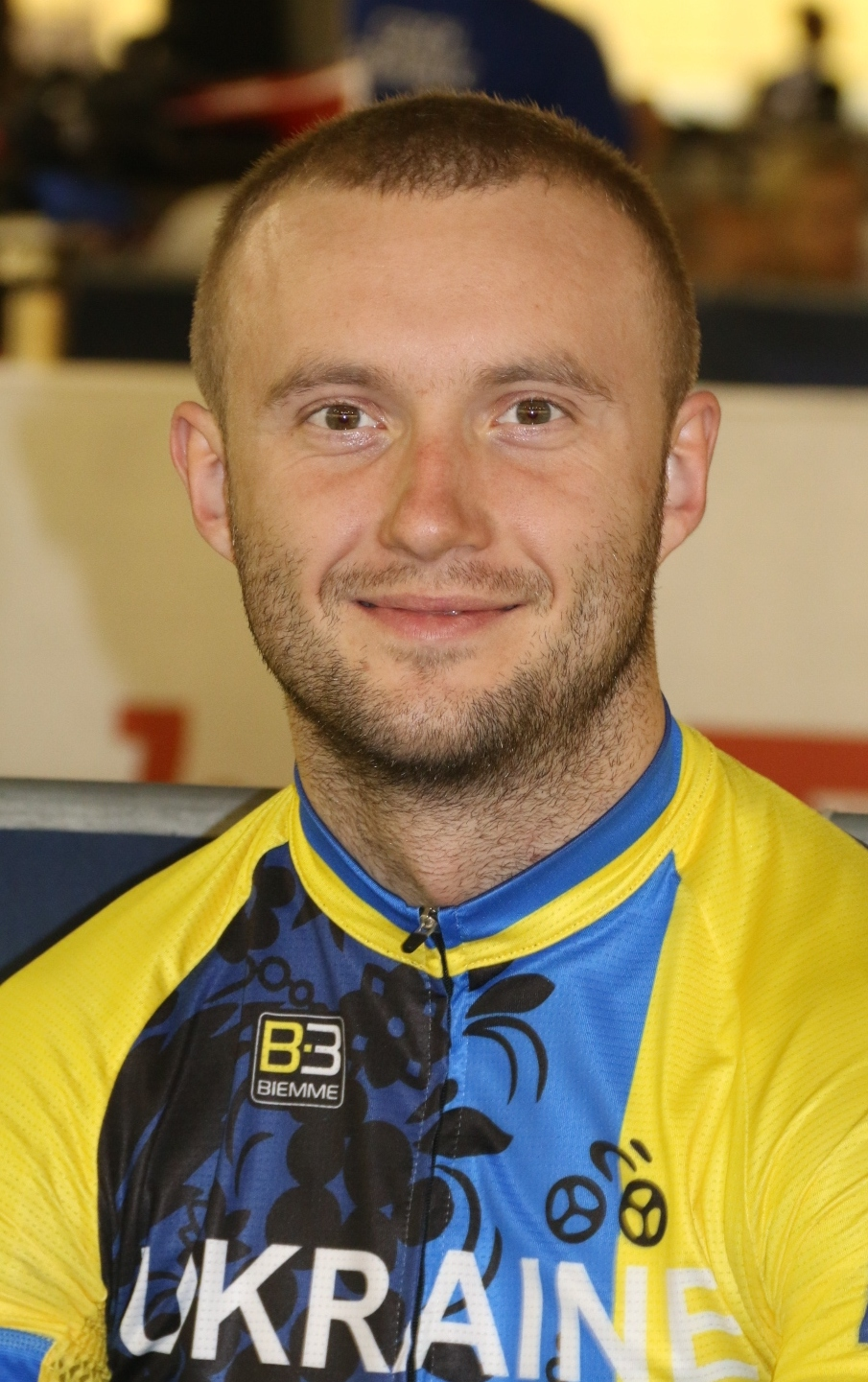
- Kutsenko in 2017

Personal information
- Born: 28 December 1989 Nesterov, Lviv Oblast, Ukrainian SSR
- Died: 3 July 2024 (aged 34) Donetsk Oblast, Ukraine

Cycling career
- Sport: Cycling
- Discipline: Track cycling
- Role: Rider
- Rider type: Team sprint

Andriy Kutsenko (Ukrainian: Андрій Володимирович Куценко; 28 December 1989 – 3 July 2024) was a Ukrainian track cyclist who competed in the team sprint event at the 2013 UCI Track Cycling World Championships. He was raised in Lviv Oblast.

With the beginning of the full-scale Russian invasion of Ukraine, Kutsenko joined the Ukrainian Army. He died during a combat mission in Donetsk Oblast, on 3 July 2024, at the age of 34.

During 2026 Winter Olympics, the International Olympic Committee banned Ukrainian skeletonist Vladyslav Heraskevych from using his helmet with images of different Ukrainian sportsmen, including Andriy Kutsenko.
