= Sandie Clair =

French cyclist

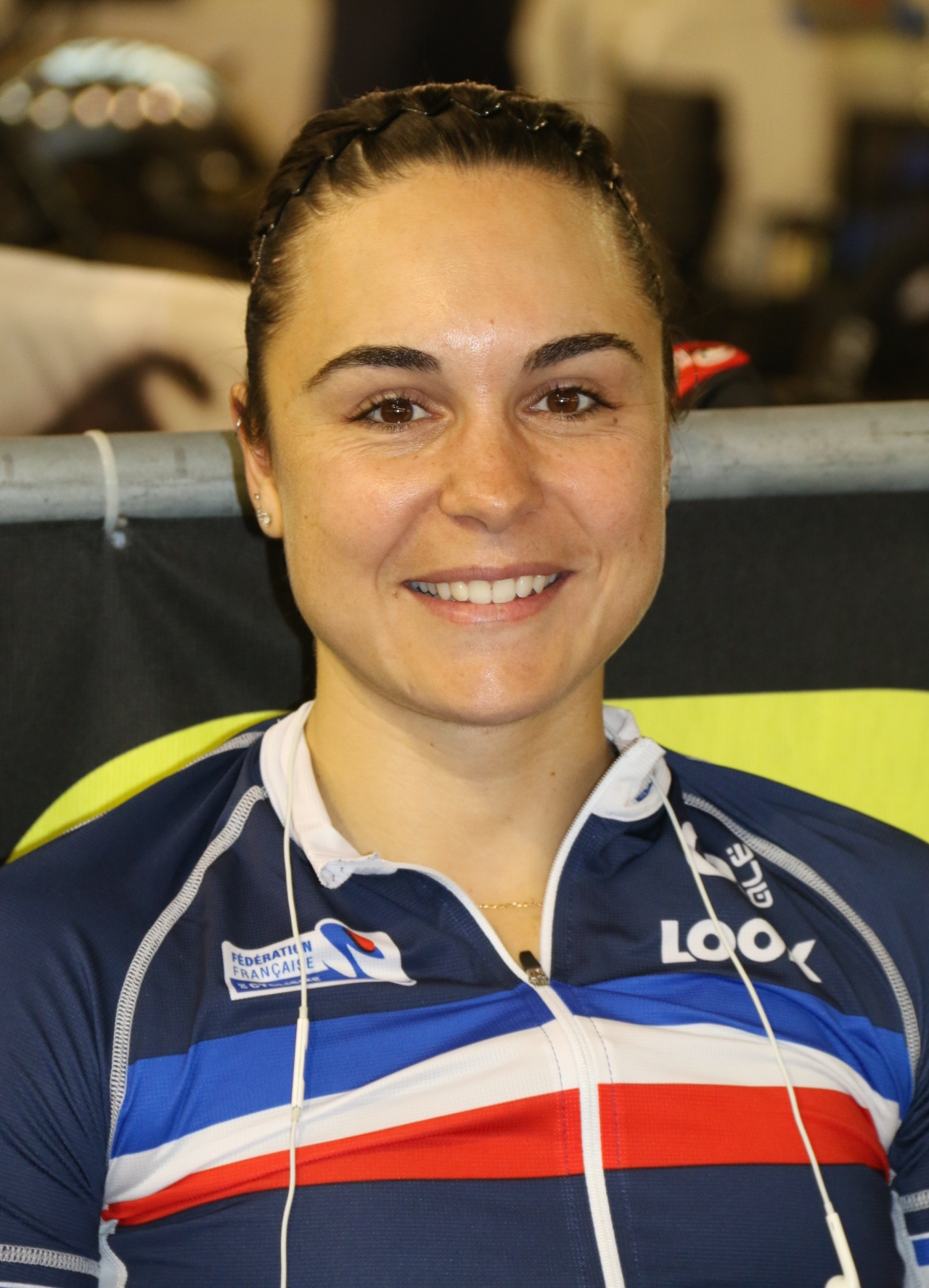
- Sandie Clair (2017)

Personal information
- Full name: Sandie Clair
- Born: 1 April 1988 (age 38) Toulon, France

Cycling career
- Sport: Cycling
- Discipline: Track
- Role: Rider
- Rider type: Sprinter
Medal record
Representing France
Women's track cycling
World Championships
Silver medal – second place	2011 Apeldoorn	500 m time trial
Bronze medal – third place	2008 Manchester	500 m time trial
European Elite Championships
Gold medal – first place	2010 Pruszków	Sprint
Gold medal – first place	2010 Pruszków	Team Sprint
Bronze medal – third place	2011 Apeldoorn	Keirin
Bronze medal – third place	2012 Panevėžys	Team sprint

Sandie Clair (born 1 April 1988) is a French professional racing cyclist and bobsledder. She won her first title in 2005 in the national junior sprint championship. It qualified her for the European junior championship in Fiorenzuola, where she won the sprint and rode the keirin and 500m time trial. She came third in the junior world 500m championship a month later.

She won two medals at the world junior championship in 2006, then at Ghent, won the world championship 500m and came third in the sprint. She rode World Cup meetings throughout 2007 and 2008 and won the team sprint with Clara Sanchez at Cali in 2008.

She came third in the 500m world championship at Manchester in 2008. From 2007 to 2010, she won eight titles at the éspoir level in the European championships, including three in the team sprint with Virginie Cueff.

In 2010, she won four medals, including three at the European éspoir championship in St Petersburg. In November, she won the sprint and team sprint championships at the élite European championship in Pruszków, riding the team sprint with Sanchez.

She represented France at the 2012 Summer Olympics (in the women's team sprint) and the 2016 Summer Olympics (in the women's sprint and the team sprint.)

== Palmarès ==
2005
1st Sprint, French National Track Championships, Juniors
3rd European Championship, Track, Sprint, Juniors (F), Fiorenzuola
3rd 500 m, UCI Track Cycling World Championships, Juniors

2006
2nd 500 m, European Track Championships, Juniors, Athens
3rd Keirin, European Track Championships, Juniors, Athens
1st 500 m, UCI B Track Cycling World Championships, Juniors, Ghent
3rd Sprint, UCI Track Cycling World Championships, Juniors, Ghent
3rd Moscow, Team Sprint (RUS)

2007
1st 500 m, European Track Championships, U23, Cottbus (GER)
3rd Sydney, Team Sprint (AUS)
2nd Beijing, Team Sprint (CHN)

2008
2nd Los Angeles, Team Sprint (USA)
UEC European U23 Track Championships

1st 500m Time Trial
1st Team Sprint (with Virginie Cueff)
2nd Keirin

2009
3rd 500m, 2009–2010 Track World Cup
UEC European U23 Track Championships

1st 500m Time Trial
1st Team Sprint (with Virginie Cueff)

2010
UEC European U23 Track Championships

1st Keirin
1st 500m Time Trial
1st Team Sprint (with Virginie Cueff)
3rd Sprint

2014
Fenioux Piste International

1st Sprint
1st Team sprint (with Virginie Cueff)
2nd Keirin

Fenioux Trophy Piste

1st Sprint
1st 500m Time Trial

GP von Deutschland im Sprint

2nd Team Sprint (with Virginie Cueff)
3rd Sprint

South East Asian GP Track (1)

3rd Keirin
3rd Sprint

3rd Sprint, South East Asian GP Track (2)
South East Asian GP Track (3)

3rd Keirin
3rd Sprint

Grand Prix de Vitesse de Saint-Denis

3rd Keirin
3rd Sprint

3rd Team Sprint, Open des Nations sur Piste de Roubaix (with Virginie Cueff)
2015
Grand Prix de Vitesse de Saint-Denis

1st Keirin
2nd Sprint

2nd Keirin, Revolution - Round 1, Derby
2nd Keirin, Trofeu CAR Anadia Portugal
2016
2nd Sprint, Fenioux Piste International
2017
Fenioux Piste International

1st Keirin
2nd Sprint
