= Eerik Idarand =

Estonian speed skater

Personal information
- Full name: Eerik Idarand
- Born: 21 July 1991 (age 35) Tallinn, Estonia
- Height: 1.82 m (6 ft 0 in)
- Weight: 80 kg (176 lb)

Cycling career
- Sport: Cycling
- Discipline: Track
- Role: Rider

Professional teams
- 2010: Kalev Chocolate–Kuota
- 2011 to 2012: Kalev Vidal Track Team

Eerik Idarand (born 21 July 1991) is an Estonian speed skater and former track cyclist.

He was born in Tallinn.

He started his sporting exercising in 2002, coached by his father Tiit Idarand. He is multiple-times Estonian champion in different skating disciplines. In 2006 he won Finnish Championships in short track speed skating. He has competed at European Track Championships.

In 2009 he was named as Best Junior Sportsman of Kalev.

In 2010 Idarand won the National Sprint championship on the track.
