= Rafał Ratajczyk =

Polish cyclist

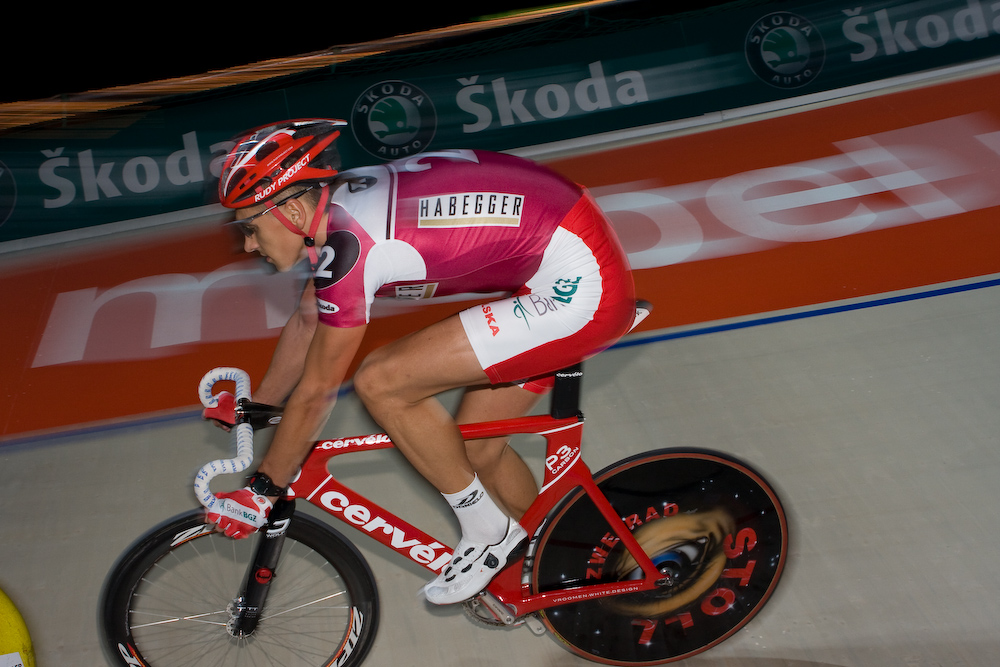

Personal information
- Full name: Rafał Ratajczyk
- Born: 5 April 1983 (age 43) Żyrardów, Poland

Cycling career
- Sport: Cycling
- Current team: Retired
- Disciplines: Track, road
- Role: Rider

Amateur teams
- 2008–2009: Polska Kadra Torowa
- 2010: Polska Narodowa

Professional teams
- 2005: Grupa PSB-Atlas-Orbea
- 2006: MBK-Cycles-Scout
- 2011–2011: CCC–Polsat–Polkowice
Medal record
Representing Poland
Men's track cycling
World Championships
Silver medal – second place	2006 Bordeaux	Points race
Bronze medal – third place	2007 Palma de Mallorca	Scratch
European Elite Championships
Gold medal – first place	2011 Apeldoorn	Points Race
Bronze medal – third place	2010 Pruszków	Omnium

Rafał Ratajczyk (born 5 April 1983, in Żyrardów) is a Polish former professional racing cyclist.

== Doping ==
In December 2009, he was banned by the Polish Cycling Association for half a year for doping. He tested positive for ephedrine.

== Career highlights ==
1. 2002: 3rd in European Championship, Track, Scratch, U23, Buttgen (GER)
2. 2004: 1st in European Championship, Track, Points race, U23, Valencia
3. 2004: 2nd in European Championship, Track, Scratch, U23, Valencia
4. 2005: 1st in National Championship, Road, ITT, U23, Poland, Sobótka (POL)
5. 2006: 1st in Manchester, Scratch (GBR)
6. 2006: 1st in Sydney, Scratch (AUS)
7. 2006: 2nd in World Championship, Track, Points race, Elite, Bordeaux
8. 2006: 2nd in European Championship, Track, Omnium, Elite, Ballerup (DEN)
9. 2007: 1st in Manchester, Scratch (GBR)
10. 2007: 3rd in World Championship, Track, Scratch, Elite, Palma de Mallorca (SPA)
11. 2007: 2nd in Aigle, Points race (SUI)
12. 2007: 2nd in European Championship, Track, Omnium, Elite, Alkmaar
13. 2007: 3rd in UIV Cup Dortmund, U23 (GER)
14. 2008: 2nd in Los Angeles, Points race (USA)
15. 2011: 1st in European Track Championships, Points race, Elite, Apeldoorn (NL)
