= Gabrielė Navardauskienė =

Lithuanian cyclist (born 1993)

Personal information
- Born: Gabrielė Jankutė; 18 December 1993 (age 32) Šilalė, Lithuania

Cycling career
- Sport: Cycling
- Current team: Retired
- Disciplines: Track; Road
- Role: Rider
- Rider type: Time trialist

Professional teams
- 2013: Sengers Ladies Cycling Team
- 2016: Lares–Waowdeals

Gabrielė Navardauskienė (née Jankutė; born 18 December 1993) is a Lithuanian former track and road cyclist. She competed in the 500 m time trial event at the 2012 UCI Track Cycling World Championships, and finished second in the 2015 Lithuanian National Road Race Championships.

== Personal life ==
In September 2017, she married fellow Lithuanian cyclist Ramūnas Navardauskas, and the couple have a son, born in 2020. Following her retirement from cycling, Navardauskienė became a police officer with the Lithuanian Police Force in Klaipėda.
