= Dimitra Patapi =

Greek cyclist (born 1992)

Personal information
- Born: 3 February 1992 (age 34)

Cycling career
- Sport: Cycling
- Discipline: Track cycling
- Role: Rider
- Rider type: team sprint

Dimitra Patapi (born 3 February 1992) is a Greek female track cyclist. She competed in the team sprint event at the 2011 UCI Track Cycling World Championships.

== Major results ==
2013
Athens Track Grand Prix

1st Keirin
1st Sprint
