= Jessica Varnish =

British track cyclist (born 1990)

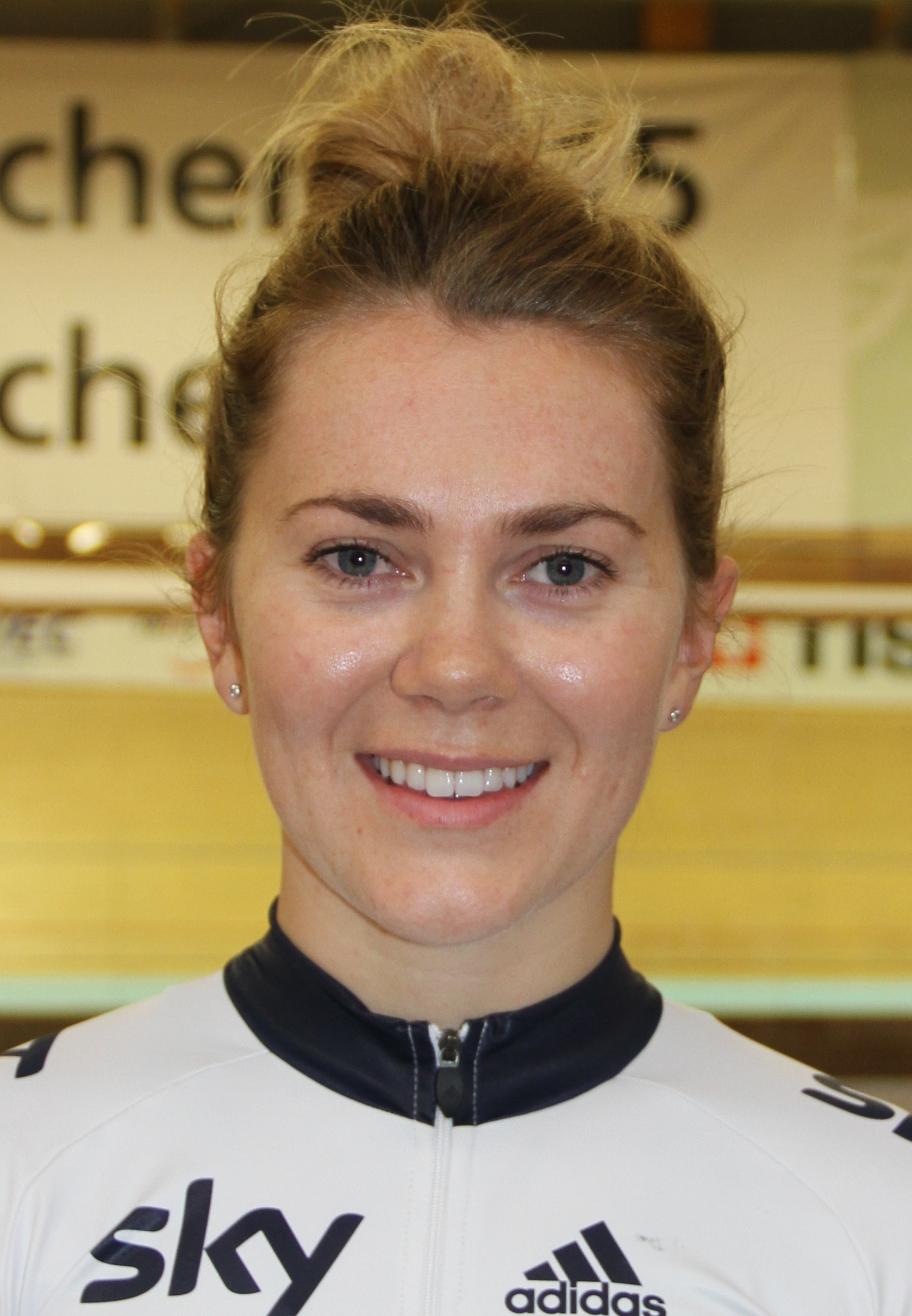
- Varnish at the 2015 UEC European Track Championships

Personal information
- Full name: Jessica Varnish
- Nickname: Jess
- Born: 19 November 1990 (age 35) Bromsgrove, Worcestershire, England, UK
- Height: 5 ft 7 in (170 cm)
- Weight: 67 kg (148 lb; 10.6 st)

Cycling career
- Sport: Cycling
- Discipline: Track
- Role: Rider
- Rider type: Sprinter

Amateur team
- 2006: Halesowen AC&C
Medal record
Representing Great Britain
Women's track cycling
World Championships
Silver medal – second place	2011 Apeldoorn	Team sprint
Bronze medal – third place	2012 Melbourne	Time Trial
Bronze medal – third place	2014 Cali	Team sprint
European Track Championships
Gold medal – first place	2011 Apeldoorn	Team sprint
Silver medal – second place	2010 Pruszków	Team sprint
Bronze medal – third place	2013 Apeldoorn	Sprint
Bronze medal – third place	2013 Apeldoorn	Team sprint
Representing England
Commonwealth Games
Bronze medal – third place	2014 Glasgow	Time Trial
Bronze medal – third place	2014 Glasgow	Sprint

Jessica Varnish (born 19 November 1990) is a British former track cyclist. Varnish was part of the team sprint line-up who set a new world record at the 2014 European Track Championships and is a multiple medallist at the World Championships.

== Biography ==
Jessica Varnish was born in Bromsgrove, Worcestershire on 19 November 1990, and attended South Bromsgrove High School.

At the age of 14, Varnish competed unofficially at the 2006 Junior World Championships in Belgium. She took a second off the British 500m standing start record, setting a new time of 37.1 seconds.

She made her GB Cycling debut at the Austrian Junior International in January 2006. She became a member of British Cycling's Olympic Development Programme whilst still a junior.

Her first performance at senior level was in the 2008 UCI Track Cycling World Championships in Manchester. In March 2009, Varnish was awarded the junior female sports personality of the year trophy at the Sports Partnership Herefordshire and Worcestershire Sports Awards. Virgin Trains West Coast named its Pendolino train 390027 after her on 29 June 2011.

On 18 February 2012, Varnish competed at the 2011-12 UCI Track Cycling World Cup event in London. Racing with her team-mate Victoria Pendleton, the pairing broke the world record for the women's team sprint in taking gold. At the 2012 Summer Olympics, Varnish and Pendleton broke the world record in the qualifying stages of the team sprint before being relegated in the semi-finals. At the 2013 British National Track Championships, Varnish won four titles, triumphing in the 500 m time trial, sprint, team sprint and keirin disciplines. The following year, Varnish successfully defended all four titles.

In April 2016 The Daily Telegraph reported that Varnish's Olympic Podium Programme contract with British Cycling had not been renewed, with Performance Director Shane Sutton stating that the decision was due to Varnish's performances over the previous three years, and denying that it was related to comments she had made in interviews at the 2016 UCI Track Cycling World Championships which were critical of the selections that had been made for the women's team sprint squad in their qualifying campaign for the 2016 Summer Olympics, which was ultimately unsuccessful. Varnish pointed out that in the two-year Olympic qualifying period she had gained more qualifying points than any other British cyclist, in the team sprint she had consistently performed in the world top five and also qualified for the Olympic places in the individual sprint and keirin.

Varnish made allegations that Sutton had made sexist comments when discussing the non-renewal of her contract. In April 2016, Sutton was suspended by British Cycling and he subsequently resigned. Following an in-house investigation, Sutton was found guilty of one charge – using sexist language towards Varnish. In 2019, Varnish lost an employment tribunal in which she argued that she was an employee of British Cycling or UK Sport. Her appeal the following year was also unsuccessful and reportedly prevented her from potentially suing British Cycling and UK Sport for unfair dismissal.

== Palmarès ==
=== Track ===
2005
1st sprint, British National Track Championships – U16
2nd 500m TT, British National Track Championships – U16
2nd Scratch race, British National Track Championships – U16

2006
1st sprint, British National Track Championships – U16
2nd 500m TT, British National Track Championships – U16
2nd Scratch race, British National Track Championships – U16

2007
1st keirin, 2007 European Track Championships – Junior
1st sprint, British National Track Championships – Junior
2nd 500m TT, 2007 European Track Championships – Junior
2nd Individual Sprint, UCI Junior Track World Championships
2nd 500m TT, British National Track Championships – Junior
3rd 500m TT, British National Track Championships – Senior
3rd Individual Sprint, British National Track Championships – Senior

2008
1st keirin, 2008 European Track Championships – Junior
1st 500m TT, 2008 European Track Championships – Junior
1st 500m TT, British National Track Championships – Junior
1st sprint, British National Track Championships – Junior
1st Team Sprint, round 1, 2008–2009 UCI Track Cycling World Cup Classics, Manchester (with Anna Blyth)
2nd British National Team Sprint Championships (with Helen Scott)
3rd Keirin, British National Track Championships – Senior
3rd Individual Sprint, 2008 European Track Championships – Junior

2011
1st 500m TT, 2011 British National Track Championships – Senior
1st Team Sprint, 2011 European Track Championships (with Victoria Pendleton)
1st 500m TT, 2011 European Track Championships – U23
1st Team Sprint, 2011 European Track Championships – U23 (with Becky James)
3rd sprint, 2011 European Track Championships – U23

2012
1st Team sprint, round 4, 2011–2012 UCI Track Cycling World Cup Classics, London (with Victoria Pendleton)
1st Team sprint, round 1, 2011–2012 UCI Track Cycling World Cup Classics, Cali (with Becky James)
1st Team sprint, round 2, 2011–2012 UCI Track Cycling World Cup Classics, Glasgow (with Becky James)
2nd Individual Sprint, round 2, 2011–2012 UCI Track Cycling World Cup Classics, Glasgow
3rd Individual Sprint, round 1, 2011–2012 UCI Track Cycling World Cup Classics, Cali

2013
1st 500m TT, British National Track Championships
1st Team Sprint, British National Track Championships
1st Individual Sprint, British National Track Championships
1st Keirin, British National Track Championships
Revolution

1st Sprint – Round 1, Manchester
2nd Keirin – Round 1, Manchester

3rd Individual Sprint, 2013 European Track Championships
3rd Team sprint, 2013 European Track Championships (with Becky James)
3rd Cottbus Individual Sprint

2014
1st Sprint, Revolution – Round 4, Manchester
1st 500m Time Trial, Cottbuser SprintCup
Open des Nations sur Piste de Roubaix

1st Sprint
1st Team Sprint (with Victoria Williamson)

1st 500m TT, British National Track Championships
1st Individual Sprint, British National Track Championships
1st Team sprint, British National Track Championships (with Dannielle Khan)
1st Keirin, British National Track Championships
3rd Team Sprint, UCI Track World Championships (with Becky James)
Commonwealth Games

3rd Sprint
3rd 500m Time Trial

3rd Team Sprint, GP von Deutschland im Sprint (with Katy Marchant)
3rd Sprint, Cottbuser Nächte

2015
Revolution

1st Keirin – Round 3, Manchester
1st Sprint – Round 3, Manchester
2nd Sprint – Round 1, Derby
2nd 500m Time Trial – Round 1, Derby

1st British National Team Sprint Championships (with Katy Marchant)
3rd Keirin, British National Track Championships
2nd Keirin, Öschelbronn
3rd Sprint, Singen
