= Victoria Baranova =

Russian cyclist

Victoria Tyumneva (Baranova)
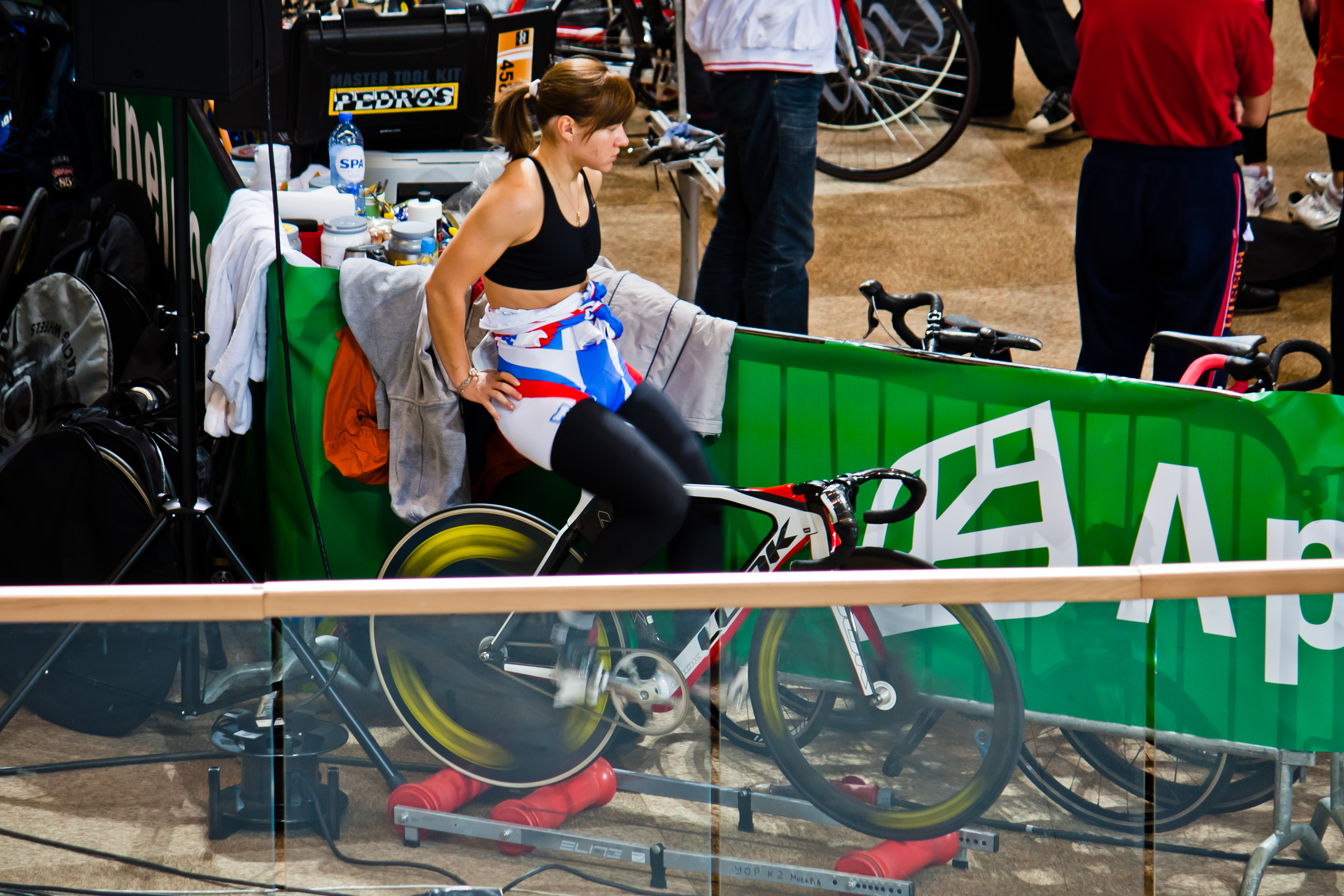

Personal information
- Full name: Victoria (or Viktoriya) Alekseyevna Tyumneva
- Born: 6 February 1990 (age 36) Zhukovsky, Moscow Oblast, Russia

Cycling career
- Sport: Cycling
- Disciplines: 500mTT, Keirin, Scratch, Sprint, Team sprint
- Role: Rider

Victoria Alekseyevna Tyumneva, née Baranova (Russian: Виктория Алексеевна Тюмнева (Баранова); born 6 February 1990) is a retired Russian track cyclist. She represented her nation at the 2015 UCI Track Cycling World Championships.

At the 2012 Summer Olympics, cycling's governing body, the UCI, confirmed that Baranova tested positive for a prohibited substance and was sent home from the Games.

== Results ==
2009
3rd Team Sprint, UCI World Track Cup, Cali
2010
3rd Team Sprint, UEC European U23 Track Championships (with Anastasia Voynova)
2011
3rd Sprint, UCI World Track Cup, Cali
3rd Team Sprint, UCI World Track Cup, Cali
3rd Sprint, UEC European Track Championships
UEC European U23 Track Championships

1st Keirin
1st Sprint
3rd 550m Time Trial

2012
UEC European U23 Track Championships

1st Keirin
1st Sprint
1st Team Sprint (with Anastasia Voynova)

2014
Grand Prix Minsk

2nd Keirin
2nd Sprint

2nd Sprint, Grand Prix of Russian Helicopters
2015
Grand Prix Minsk

1st Team Sprint (with Elena Brejniva)
2nd Keirin
2nd Sprint

2nd Keirin, Panevezys
3rd Team Sprint, Grand Prix of Tula (with Elena Brejniva)
