= Angeliki Koutsonikoli =

Greek cyclist (1989–2012)

Personal information
- Born: 2 June 1989
- Died: 5 July 2012 (aged 23)

Cycling career
- Sport: Cycling
- Discipline: Track cycling
- Role: Rider
- Rider type: 500 m time trial team sprint

Angeliki Koutsonikoli (2 June 1989 – 5 July 2012) was a Greek female track cyclist. She competed at the 2010 and 2011 UCI Track Cycling World Championships.
