= 2010 UEC European Track Championships =

- Venue: Pruszków, Poland
- Date(s): 5–7 November 2010
- Velodrome: BGŻ Arena
- Events: 11

The 2010 European Track Championships were the inaugural elite European Track Championships in track cycling and took place at the BGŻ Arena in Pruszków, Poland, between 5 and 7 November.

All ten Olympic events (sprint, team sprint, keirin, team pursuit and omnium all for both men and women) and a men's madison championship were held as part of the championships. The Championships were the first European event for qualification for the 2012 Olympic Games.

== Events ==
Event	Gold		Silver		Bronze	
Men's events
Sprint	Denis Dmitriev; Russia		Kévin Sireau; France		Jason Kenny; Great Britain	
Team sprint	Robert Förstemann; Maximilian Levy; Stefan Nimke; Germany	44.066	Michaël D'Almeida; François Pervis; Kévin Sireau; France	44.281	Matt Crampton; Chris Hoy; Jason Kenny; Great Britain	43.968
Keirin	Jason Kenny; Great Britain		Matt Crampton; Great Britain		Adam Ptáčník; Czech Republic	
Omnium	Roger Kluge; Germany		Tim Veldt; Netherlands		Rafał Ratajczyk; Poland	
Team pursuit	Steven Burke; Ed Clancy; Jason Queally; Andy Tennant; Great Britain	4:00.482	Evgeny Kovalev; Ivan Kovalev; Alexei Markov; Alexander Serov; Russia	4:04.274	Levi Heimans; Arno van der Zwet; Tim Veldt; Sipke Zijlstra; Netherlands	4:06.049
Madison	Martin Bláha; Jiří Hochmann; Czech Republic		Kenny De Ketele; Tim Mertens; Belgium		Mykhaylo Radionov; Sergiy Lagkuti; Ukraine	
Women's events
Sprint	Sandie Clair; France		Kristina Vogel; Germany		Simona Krupeckaitė; Lithuania	
Team sprint	Sandie Clair; Clara Sanchez; France	33.478	Victoria Pendelton; Jessica Varnish; Great Britain	33.586	Kristina Vogel; Miriam Welte; Germany	33.708
Keirin	Olga Panarina; Belarus		Simona Krupeckaitė; Lithuania		Lyubov Shulika; Ukraine	
Omnium	Leire Olaberria; Spain		Tatsiana Sharakova; Belarus		Małgorzata Wojtyra; Poland	
Team pursuit	Katie Colclough; Wendy Houvenaghel; Laura Trott; Great Britain	3:23.435	Vaida Pikauskaitė; Vilija Sereikaitė; Aušrinė Trebaitė; Lithuania	3.29.992	Lisa Brennauer; Verena Jooss; Madeleine Sandig; Germany	3:28.127

- Shaded events are non-Olympic events.

== Medal table ==
Rank	Nation	Gold	Silver	Bronze	Total
1	GBR	3	2	2	7
2	FRA	2	2	0	4
3	GER	2	1	2	5
4	BLR	1	1	0	2
4	RUS	1	1	0	2
6	CZE	1	0	1	2
7	ESP	1	0	0	1
8	LTU	0	2	1	3
9	NED	0	1	1	2
10	BEL	0	1	0	1
11	POL	0	0	2	2
11	UKR	0	0	2	2
Totals (12 entries)		11	11	11	33

== Participating nations ==
25 nations participated.

- Austria
- Azerbaijan
- Belgium
- Belarus
- Bulgaria
- Czech Republic
- Estonia
- Finland
- France
- Georgia
- Germany
- Great Britain
- Greece
- Hungary
- Ireland
- Italy
- Lithuania
- Netherlands, see: Netherlands at the 2010 European Track Championships
- Poland
- Russia
- Switzerland
- Slovakia
- Spain
- Turkey
- Ukraine
