= Belarus at the UEC European Track Championships =

Belarus at the European Track Championships is an overview of the results from Belarus at the European Track Championships. Since 2001 there are the European Track Championships for under-23 and junior riders and since 2010 the European Track Championships for elite riders. Note that the under-23 and junior championships before 2010 also included omnium elite events.

== European Track Championships (elite) 2010-current ==
Belarus at the European Track Championships (elite)
- IOC code: BLR

2010 –
- Medals Ranked 13th: Gold 2 Silver 3 Bronze 4 Total 9

European Track Championships (elite) appearances
- 2010; 2011; 2012; 2013; 2014; 2015; 2016

=== Medalists ===
This is a list of medals won at the UEC European Track Championships for elite riders from 2010 to current.

Medal	Championship	Name	Event
Gold	(Poland) 2010 Pruszków	Olga Panarina	Women's keirin
Silver	(Poland) 2010 Pruszków	Tatsiana Sharakova	Women's omnium
Silver	(Netherlands) 2011 Apeldoorn	Olga Panarina	Women's sprint
Silver	(Netherlands) 2011 Apeldoorn	Tatsiana Sharakova	Women's omnium
Bronze	(Netherlands) 2011 Apeldoorn	Alena Dylko; Aksana Papko; Tatsiana Sharakova	Women's team sprint
Gold	(Lithuania) 2012 Panevėžys	Olga Panarina	Women's sprint
Bronze	(Lithuania) 2012 Panevėžys	Tatsiana Sharakova; Alena Dylko; Aksana Papko	Women's team pursuit
Bronze	(Switzerland) 2015 Grenchen	Katsiaryna Piatrouskaya; Polina Pivavarava; Ina Savenka; Marina Shmayankova	Women's team pursuit
Bronze	(France) 2016 Saint-Quentin-en-Yvelines	Raman Ramanau	Men's points race
Bronze	(Germany) 2017 Berlin	Tatsiana Sharakova	Women's points race

=== Medals by year ===
Championship	Gold	Silver	Bronze	Total	Rank
(Poland) 2010 Pruszków	1	1	0	2	4th
(Netherlands) 2011 Apeldoorn	0	2	1	3	8th
(Lithuania) 2012 Panevėžys	1	0	1	2	5th
(Netherlands) 2013 Apeldoorn	0	0	0	0	-
(France) 2014 Guadeloupe	0	0	0	0	-
(Switzerland) 2015 Grenchen	0	0	1	1	12th
(France) 2016 Saint-Quentin-en-Yvelines	0	0	1	1	16th
(Germany) 2017 Berlin	0	0	1	1	
Total	2	3	5	10	13th

== European Track Championships (under-23 & junior) 2001-current ==
Belarus at the European Track Championships (under 23 & junior)
- IOC code: BLR

2001 –
- Medals: Gold 56 Silver 50 Bronze 38 Total 144

European Track Championships (under 23 & junior) appearances
- 2009; 2010; 2011; 2012; 2013; 2014; 2015; 2016; 2017; 2018; 2019; 2020; 2021; 2022; 2023; 2024; 2025; 2026

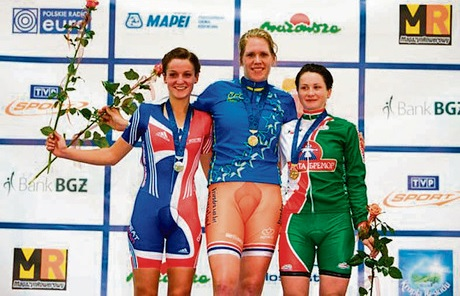
Aksana Papko won bronze behind Ellen van Dijk (1st) and Lizzie Armitstead (2nd) in the 2008 women's under-23 points race.

Below is an overview of the Dutch results at the European Track Championships for under-23 and junior riders. Note that these championships also had a few elite events.

=== Medals by year ===
Championship	Gold	Silver	Bronze	Total	Rank
(Czech Republic) 2001 Brno	0	0	0	0	-
(Germany) 2002 Büttgen	0	0	0	0	-
(Russia) 2003 Moscow	0	1	2	3	12th
(Spain) 2004 Valence	0	1	1	2	13th
(Italy) 2005 Fiorenzuola d'Arda	1	0	0	1	11th
(Greece) 2006 Athens	1	0	1	2	7th
(Germany) 2007 Cottbus	0	0	0	0	-
(Poland) 2008 Pruszków	0	0	1	1	17th
(Belarus) 2009 Minsk	0	0	0	0	-
(Russia) 2010 Saint Petersburg	2	0	1	3	7th
(Portugal) 2011 Anadia	0	0	0	0	-
(Portugal) 2012 Anadia	0	0	1	1	14th
(Portugal) 2013 Anadia	1	0	2	3	10th
(Portugal) 2014 Anadia	0	2	1	3	14th
Total	5	4	10	19	

== See also ==
- Great Britain at the European Track Championships
- Netherlands at the European Track Championships
