= 2011 UCI Track Cycling World Championships – Women's sprint =

Women's sprint at the 2011 UCI Track Cycling World Championships
- Venue: Omnisport Apeldoorn, Apeldoorn
- Date: 25–26 March 2011
- Competitors: 27 from 16 nations

Medalists
gold medal	Anna Meares	Australia
silver medal	Simona Krupeckaitė	Lithuania
bronze medal	Victoria Pendleton	Great Britain

Rainbow jersey

The Women's sprint at the 2011 UCI Track Cycling World Championships was held on March 25 and 26. 28 athletes participated in the contest. After the qualifying heats, the fastest 24 riders advanced to the 1/16 finals.

The first rider in each of the 12 heats advanced to the second round. There was no repechage for this round.

The first rider from each of the six Second Round heats advanced to the Quarterfinals and the second placed riders advanced to a repechage to determine the other two riders that competed in the quarterfinals.

The first rider in each quarterfinal advanced to the semifinals and the 4 losing athletes raced for 5th-8th place.

The qualifying, first round, second round, second round repechages and quarterfinals took place on 25 March. The Semifinals and Finals took place on 26 March.

== Results ==
=== Qualifying ===
The Qualifying was held at 15:25.

Rank	Name	Nation	Time	Notes
1	Olga Panarina	Belarus	11.120	Q
2	Anna Meares	Australia	11.120	Q
3	Lyubov Shulika	Ukraine	11.152	Q
4	Guo Shuang	China	11.188	Q
5	Simona Krupeckaitė	Lithuania	11.291	Q
6	Victoria Pendleton	United Kingdom	11.299	Q
7	Becky James	United Kingdom	11.365	Q
8	Kaarle McCulloch	Australia	11.368	Q
9	Kristina Vogel	Germany	11.387	Q
10	Sandie Clair	France	11.398	Q
11	Jessica Varnish	United Kingdom	11.401	Q
12	Virginie Cueff	France	11.424	Q
13	Lisandra Guerra	Cuba	11.456	Q
14	Junhong Lin	China	11.494	Q
15	Monique Sullivan	Canada	11.502	Q
16	Gong Jinjie	China	11.514	Q
17	Lee Wai Sze	Hong Kong	11.522	Q
18	Emily Rosemond	Australia	11.546	Q
19	Viktoria Baranova	Russia	11.563	Q
20	Yvonne Hijgenaar	Netherlands	11.594	Q
21	Miriam Welte	Germany	11.733	Q
22	Gintarė Gaivenytė	Lithuania	11.736	Q
23	Kim Won-Gyeong	South Korea	11.748	Q
24	Park Eun-Mi	South Korea	12.022	Q
25	Fatehah Mustapa	Malaysia	12.125	
26	Juliana Gaviria	Colombia	12.217	
27	Meng Zhao Juan	Hong Kong	12.377	
–	Willy Kanis	Netherlands	DNS	

=== 1/16 Finals ===
The 1/16 Finals were held at 16:40.

Heat	Rank	Name	Nation	Time	Notes
1	1	Olga Panarina	Belarus	12.465	Q
1	2	Park Eun-Mi	South Korea		
2	1	Anna Meares	Australia	12.203	Q
2	2	Kim Won-Gyeong	South Korea		
3	1	Lyubov Shulika	Ukraine	13.362	Q
3	2	Gintarė Gaivenytė	Lithuania		
4	1	Guo Shuang	China	11.966	Q
4	2	Miriam Welte	Germany		
5	1	Simona Krupeckaitė	Lithuania	11.882	Q
5	2	Yvonne Hijgenaar	Netherlands		
6	1	Victoria Pendleton	United Kingdom	11.671	Q
6	2	Viktoria Baranova	Russia		
7	1	Becky James	United Kingdom	11.874	Q
7	2	Emily Rosemond	Australia		
8	1	Kaarle McCulloch	Australia	11.970	Q
8	2	Lee Wai Sze	Hong Kong		
9	1	Kristina Vogel	Germany	11.700	Q
9	2	Gong Jinjie	China		
10	1	Sandie Clair	France	11.699	Q
10	2	Monique Sullivan	Canada		
11	1	Jessica Varnish	United Kingdom	11.862	Q
11	2	Junhong Lin	China		
12	1	Virginie Cueff	France	12.088	Q
12	–	Lisandra Guerra	Cuba	REL	

=== 1/8 Finals ===
The 1/8 Finals were held at 18:30.

Heat	Rank	Name	Nation	Time	Notes
1	1	Olga Panarina	Belarus	11.923	Q
1	2	Virginie Cueff	France		
2	1	Anna Meares	Australia	11.736	Q
2	2	Jessica Varnish	United Kingdom		
3	1	Lyubov Shulika	Ukraine	11.896	Q
3	2	Sandie Clair	France		
4	1	Guo Shuang	China	11.790	Q
4	2	Kristina Vogel	Germany		
5	1	Simona Krupeckaitė	Lithuania	12.001	Q
5	2	Kaarle McCulloch	Australia		
6	1	Victoria Pendleton	United Kingdom	11.542	Q
6	2	Becky James	United Kingdom		

=== 1/8 Finals Repechage ===
The 1/8 Finals Repechage were held at 19:00.

Heat	Rank	Name	Nation	Time	Notes
1	1	Kristina Vogel	Germany	12.068	Q
1	2	Becky James	United Kingdom		
1	3	Virginie Cueff	France		
2	1	Sandie Clair	France	12.389	Q
2	2	Kaarle McCulloch	Australia		
2	3	Jessica Varnish	United Kingdom		

=== Quarterfinals ===
The races were held at 20:00, 20:35 and 21:10.

Heat	Rank	Name	Nation	Race 1	Race 2	Decider	Notes
1	1	Olga Panarina	Belarus	11.671	11.464		Q
1	2	Sandie Clair	France				
2	1	Anna Meares	Australia	11.776	11.363		Q
2	2	Kristina Vogel	Germany				
3	1	Victoria Pendleton	United Kingdom	11.542	11.620		Q
3	2	Lyubov Shulika	Ukraine				
4	1	Simona Krupeckaitė	Lithuania	11.762		11.494	Q
4	2	Guo Shuang	China		11.946		

=== Race for 5th-8th Places ===
The race Race for 5th-8th Places was held at 21:35.

Rank	Name	Nation	Time
5	Lyubov Shulika	Ukraine	11.633
6	Sandie Clair	France	
7	Kristina Vogel	Germany	
8	Guo Shuang	China	

=== Semifinals ===
The Semifinals were held at 14:00, 14:40 and 15:05.

Heat	Rank	Name	Nation	Race 1	Race 2	Decider	Notes
1	1	Simona Krupeckaitė	Lithuania		11.384	12.526	Q
1	2	Olga Panarina	Belarus	12.203			
2	1	Anna Meares	Australia	11.552		11.473	Q
2	2	Victoria Pendleton	United Kingdom		11.338		

=== Finals ===
The finals were held at 15:35 and 16:00.

Rank	Name	Nation	Race 1	Race 2	Decider
Gold Medal Races
1st place, gold medalist(s)	Anna Meares	Australia	11.984	11.453	
2nd place, silver medalist(s)	Simona Krupeckaitė	Lithuania			
Bronze Medal Races
3rd place, bronze medalist(s)	Victoria Pendleton	United Kingdom	11.682	11.682	
4	Olga Panarina	Belarus			
