= 2011 UCI Track Cycling World Championships – Women's keirin =

Rainbow jersey

The Women's keirin at the 2011 UCI Track Cycling World Championships was held on March 27. 23 athletes participated in the contest. After the 4 qualifying heats, the 2 fastest rider in each heat advanced to the second round. The riders that did not advance to the second round raced in 4 repechage heats. The first rider in each heat advanced to the second round along with the 8 that qualified before.

The first 3 riders from each of the 2 Second Round heats advanced to the Final and the remaining riders raced a consolation 7–12 final.

== Results ==
=== First round ===
The First Round was held at 10:30.

Rank	Heat	Name	Nation	Notes
1	1	Kristina Vogel	Germany	Q
2	1	Fatehah Mustapa	Malaysia	Q
3	1	Simona Krupeckaitė	Lithuania	
4	1	Sandie Clair	France	
5	1	Meng Zhao Juan	Hong Kong	
1	2	Lyubov Shulika	Ukraine	Q
2	2	Guo Shuang	China	Q
3	2	Victoria Pendleton	United Kingdom	
4	2	Lisandra Guerra	Cuba	
5	2	Diana García	Colombia	
6	2	Aksana Papko	Belarus	
1	3	Anna Meares	Australia	Q
2	3	Park Eun-Mi	South Korea	Q
3	3	Emily Rosemond	Australia	
4	3	Gong Jinjie	China	
5	3	Olga Panarina	Belarus	
6	3	Junhong Lin	China	
1	4	Clara Sanchez	France	Q
2	4	Lee Wai Sze	Hong Kong	Q
3	4	Kaarle McCulloch	Australia	
4	4	Becky James	United Kingdom	
5	4	Yvonne Hijgenaar	Netherlands	
6	4	Gintarė Gaivenytė	Lithuania	

=== First Round Repechage ===
The First Round Repechage was held at 12:10.

Rank	Heat	Name	Nation	Notes
1	1	Olga Panarina	Belarus	Q
2	1	Simona Krupeckaitė	Lithuania	
3	1	Becky James	United Kingdom	
4	1	Aksana Papko	Belarus	
1	2	Victoria Pendleton	United Kingdom	Q
2	2	Gong Jinjie	China	
3	2	Diana García	Colombia	
1	3	Lisandra Guerra	Cuba	Q
2	3	Gintarė Gaivenytė	Lithuania	
3	3	Meng Zhao Juan	Hong Kong	
4	3	Emily Rosemond	Australia	
1	4	Sandie Clair	France	Q
2	4	Kaarle McCulloch	Australia	
3	4	Yvonne Hijgenaar	Netherlands	
4	4	Junhong Lin	China	

=== Second round ===
The Second Round was held at 10:30.

Rank	Heat	Name	Nation	Notes
1	1	Clara Sanchez	France	Q
2	1	Guo Shuang	China	Q
3	1	Olga Panarina	Belarus	Q
4	1	Kristina Vogel	Germany	
5	1	Park Eun-Mi	South Korea	
6	1	Sandie Clair	France	
1	2	Anna Meares	Australia	Q
2	2	Lisandra Guerra	Cuba	Q
3	2	Fatehah Mustapa	Malaysia	Q
4	2	Victoria Pendleton	United Kingdom	
5	2	Lee Wai Sze	Hong Kong	
6	2	Lyubov Shulika	Ukraine	

=== Final 7-12 places ===
Rank	Name	Nation	Notes
7	Victoria Pendleton	United Kingdom	
8	Lyubov Shulika	Ukraine	
9	Sandie Clair	France	
10	Kristina Vogel	Germany	
11	Park Eun-Mi	South Korea	
12	Lee Wai Sze	Hong Kong	

=== Final ===
The finals were held at 17:05.

Rank	Name	Nation	Notes
1st place, gold medalist(s)	Anna Meares	Australia	
2nd place, silver medalist(s)	Olga Panarina	Belarus	
3rd place, bronze medalist(s)	Clara Sanchez	France	
4	Guo Shuang	China	
5	Fatehah Mustapa	Malaysia	
6	Lisandra Guerra	Cuba	
