= 2009 UEC European Track Championships =

- Venue: Minsk, Belarus
- Date: 15–19 July 2009
- Events: 33+4

The 2009 European Track Championships were the European Championship for track cycling, for junior and under 23 riders. They took place in Minsk, Belarus from 15 July to 19 July 2009.

2009 was the final year this event was held for junior and under-23 riders. Following a widescale redesign of European track cycling by the UEC, an event under the same name, but for elite cyclists, was held from 2010. In addition, a new competition, explicitly named the European Track Championships for under-23 and Juniors, was held from 2010 in a separate event.

== Medal summary ==
=== Under 23 ===
Event	Gold		Silver		Bronze	
Men's events
Men's under-23 sprint	Kévin Sireau; France		Jason Kenny; Great Britain		Tobias Wachter; Germany	
Men's under-23 1 km time trial	Michaël D'Almeida; France	1:01.9	Maximilian Levy; Germany	1:02.0	Thomas Bonafos; France	1:02.5
Men's under-23 individual pursuit	Steven Burke; Great Britain	4:24.1	Valery Kaykov; Russia	4:25.3	Alexandre Pliușchin; Moldova	4:27.7
Men's under-23 team pursuit	Artur Ershov; Valery Kaykov; Evgeny Kovalev; Alexander Petrovskiy; Russia		Mark Christian; Andrew Fenn; Luke Rowe; Erick Rowsell; Great Britain		Pawel Brylowski; Dawid Glowacki; Adrian Kurek; Grzegorz Stępniak; Poland	
Men's under-23 team sprint	Michaël D'Almeida; Thierry Jollet; Kévin Sireau; France		Jason Kenny; David Daniell; Peter Mitchell; Great Britain		Maciej Bielecki; Krzysztof Szymanek; Adrian Tekliński; Poland	
Men's under-23 keirin	Maximilian Levy; Germany		Jason Kenny; Great Britain		Christos Volikakis; Greece	
Men's under-23 scratch race	Elia Viviani; Italy		Luke Rowe; Great Britain		Albert Torres; Spain	
Men's under-23 points race	Artur Ershov; Russia	55	Alexandre Pliușchin; Moldova	51	Mark Christian; Great Britain	47
Women's events
Women's under-23 sprint	Lyubov Shulika; Ukraine		Olga Streltsova; Russia		Virginie Cueff; France	
U23 Women's 500m time trial	Sandie Clair; France	34	Virginie Cueff; France	35	Vilija Sereikaitė; Lithuania	35
Women's under-23 individual pursuit	Vilija Sereikaitė; Lithuania	3:36	Lesya Kalytovska; Ukraine	3:37	Aušrinė Trebaitė; Lithuania	3:44
Women's under-23 team pursuit	Svitlana Halyuk; Lesya Kalytovska; Anna Nahirna; Ukraine	3:28	Kelly Druyts; Jolien D'Hoore; Jessie Daams; Belgium	3:30	Lisa Brennauer; Franziska Merten; Laura Dittmann; Germany	3:32
Women's under-23 team sprint	Sandie Clair; Virginie Cueff; France	34	Victoria Baranova; Olga Streltsova; Russia	36	Renata Dąbrowska; Marta Janowiak; Poland	35
Women's under-23 keirin	Lyubov Shulika; Ukraine		Renata Dąbrowska; Poland		Olga Streltsova; Russia	
Women's under-23 scratch race	Anna Blyth; Great Britain		Małgorzata Wojtyra; Poland		Evgenia Romanyuta; Russia	
Women's under-23 points race	Marta Tagliaferro; Italy	28	Victoria Kondel; Russia	25	Lesya Kalytovska; Ukraine	24

=== Junior ===
Event	Gold		Silver		Bronze	
Men's events
Junior Men's Sprint	Sergey Litvinenko; Russia		Nikolay Zhurkin; Russia		Eric Engler; Germany	
Junior Men's 1 km Time Trial	Loris Paoli; Italy	1:03	Krzysztof Maksel; Poland	1:04	Nikolay Zhurkin; Russia	1:04
Junior Men's Individual Pursuit	Konstantin Kuperasov; Russia	3:20	Ivan Savitsky; Russia	3:22	George Atkins; Great Britain	3:23
Junior Men's Team Pursuit	Konstantin Kuperasov; Victor Manakov; Ivan Savitsky; Matvey Zubov; Russia	4:10.640	Tim Kennaugh; Jon Mould; Chris Whorral; Sam Harrison; George Atkins; Great Britain	4:14.340	Bryan Coquard; Emmanuel Keo; Julien Morice; Jules Pijourlet; France	4:14.434
Junior Men's Team Sprint	Erik Balzer; Eric Engler; Alexander Reinelt; Germany	46.687	Pawel Laskowski; Kacper Lesniak; Krzysztof Maksel; Poland	46.711	Kevin Guillot; Mickael Valenza; Florian Vernay; France	46.863
Junior Men's Keirin	Konstantinos Karageorgos; Greece		Alexander Reinelt; Germany		Kevin Guillot; France	
Junior Men's Scratch	Bryan Coquard; France		Dario Sonda; Italy		Chris Whorral; Great Britain	
Junior Men's Points Race	Elia Ongaretto; Italy		Matvey Zubov; Russia		Tim Kennaugh; Great Britain	
Junior Men's Madison	Jon Mould; Chris Whorral; Great Britain	3	Italy	15 (-1 lap)	Dan McLay; Sam Harrison; Great Britain	13 (-1 lap)
Women's events
Junior Women's Sprint	Becky James; Great Britain		Laurie Berthon; France		Ekaterina Gnidenko; Russia	
Junior Women's 500 m Time Trial	Becky James; Great Britain	35.290	Olivia Montauba; France	35.670	Magali Baudacci; France	35.850
Junior Women's Individual Pursuit	Hanna Solovey; Ukraine	2:24.650	Lucie Záleská; Czech Republic	2:25.460	Laura Trott; Great Britain	2:28.100
Junior Women's Team Pursuit	Jessica Booth; Laura Trott; Ella Sadler-Andrews; Great Britain	3:30.627	Galina Streltsova; Elena Lichmanova; Lidia Malakhov; Russia	3:34.501	Inna Metalnikova; Yelyzaveta Oshurkova; Hanna Solovey; Ukraine	3:36.110
Junior Women's Team Sprint	Laurie Berthon; Olivia Montauban; France	35.171	Aleksandra Drejgier; Dominika Zukowska; Poland	35.973	Charlotte Arndt; Christina Konsulke; Germany	35.971
Junior Women's Keirin	Ekaterina Gnidenko; Russia		Becky James; Great Britain		Varvara Boyko; Russia	
Junior Women's Scratch	Giulia Donato; Italy		Gabriela Slamova; Czech Republic		Roxane Fournier; France	
Junior Women's Points Race	Hanna Solovey; Ukraine	25	Aude Biannic; France	13	Laura Trott; Great Britain	12

== Medal table ==
Rank	Nation	Gold	Silver	Bronze	Total
1	Russia (RUS)	7	9	6	22
2	France (FRA)	7	5	7	19
3	Great Britain (GBR)	6	7	7	20
4	Italy (ITA)	5	2	1	8
5	Ukraine (UKR)	5	1	3	9
6	Germany (GER)	2	3	4	9
7	Lithuania (LTU)	2	0	2	4
8	Poland (POL)	1	5	3	9
9	Czech Republic (CZE)	1	2	0	3
10	Greece (GRE)	1	0	1	2
11	Belgium (BEL)	0	2	0	2
12	Moldova (MDA)	0	1	1	2
13	Spain (ESP)	0	0	2	2
Totals (13 entries)		37	37	37	111

== 2009 European Track Championships in Belgium ==
2009 UEC European Track Championships
- Venue: Belgium
- Date: 17–18 October 2009

The men's and women's omnium took place at 17 and 18 October in Belgium.

=== Results ===
Event	Gold		Silver		Bronze	
Men's events
Elite Men's omnium	Rafał Ratajczyk; Poland	49	Robert Bartko; Germany	35	Unai Elorriaga Zubiaur; Spain	34
Women's events
Elite Women's Omnium	Evgenia Romanyuta; Russia	43	Jolien D'Hoore; Belgium	39	Monia Baccaolle; Italy	36

=== Omnium sprint ===
Année	Gold	Silver	Bronze
2009	CZE Denis Špička	FRA François Pervis	UKR Andriy Vynokourov
2009	LTU Simona Krupeckaitė	RUS Olga Streltsova	RUS Viktoria Baranova
