= 2015 UEC European Track Championships – Women's keirin =

Women's keirin at the 2015 UEC European Track Championships
- UEC European Champion jersey
- Venue: Velodrome Suisse, Grenchen
- Date: 18 October
- Competitors: 19 from 11 nations

Medalists
gold medal	Elis Ligtlee	Netherlands
silver medal	Virginie Cueff	France
bronze medal	Ekaterina Gnidenko	Russia

The Women's keirin was held on 18 October 2015.

== Results ==
=== First round ===
Top two in each heat qualified directly for the second round; the remainder went to the first round repechage.

==== Heat 1 ====
Rank	Name	Nation	Gap	Notes
1	Kristina Vogel	Germany		Q
2	Helena Casas	Spain	+0.606	Q
3	Katy Marchant	Great Britain	+0.752	
4	Katarzyna Kirschenstein	Poland	+0.843	
5	Liubov Basova	Ukraine	+0.850	
6	Laurine van Riessen	Netherlands	REL	

==== Heat 2 ====
Rank	Name	Nation	Gap	Notes
1	Elis Ligtlee	Netherlands		Q
2	Ekaterina Gnidenko	Russia	+0.034	Q
3	Olivia Montauban	France	+0.128	
4	Victoria Williamson	Great Britain	+0.189	
5	Shannon McCurley	Ireland	+0.399	
6	Miglė Marozaitė	Lithuania	+0.525	

==== Heat 3 ====
Rank	Name	Nation	Gap	Notes
1	Virginie Cueff	France		Q
2	Tania Calvo	Spain	+0.076	Q
3	Simona Krupeckaitė	Lithuania	+0.154	
4	Anastasiia Voinova	Russia	+0.242	
5	Urszula Los	Poland	+0.344	
6	Nicky Degrendele	Belgium	+0.378	
7	Maila Andreotti	Italy	+1.593	

=== First round Repechage ===
First three riders in each heat qualified for the second round.

==== Heat 1 ====
Rank	Name	Nation	Gap	Notes
1	Liubov Basova	Ukraine		Q
2	Urszula Los	Poland	+0.081	Q
3	Katy Marchant	Great Britain	+0.119	Q
4	Maila Andreotti	Italy	+0.141	
5	Miglė Marozaitė	Lithuania	+0.468	
6	Victoria Williamson	Great Britain	DNF	
6	Simona Krupeckaitė	Lithuania	DNF	

==== Heat 2 ====
Rank	Name	Nation	Gap	Notes
1	Anastasiia Voinova	Russia		Q
2	Olivia Montauban	France	+0.099	Q
3	Katarzyna Kirschenstein	Poland	+0.149	Q
4	Laurine van Riessen	Netherlands	+0.196	
5	Shannon McCurley	Ireland	+0.255	
6	Nicky Degrendele	Belgium	+0.376	

=== Second round ===
First three riders in each semi qualified for the final; the remainder went to the small final (for places 7-12).

==== Semi-final 1 ====
Rank	Name	Nation	Gap	Notes
1	Kristina Vogel	Germany		Q
2	Ekaterina Gnidenko	Russia	+0.080	Q
3	Virginie Cueff	France	+0.150	Q
4	Katy Marchant	Great Britain	+0.185	
5	Tania Calvo	Spain	+0.220	
6	Urszula Los	Poland	+0.479	

==== Semi-final 2 ====
Rank	Name	Nation	Gap	Notes
1	Elis Ligtlee	Netherlands		Q
2	Olivia Montauban	France	+0.071	Q
3	Liubov Basova	Ukraine	+0.144	Q
4	Anastasiia Voinova	Russia	+0.152	
5	Helena Casas	Spain	+0.186	
6	Katarzyna Kirschenstein	Poland	+0.194	

=== Finals ===
The final classification is determined in the ranking finals.

==== Final (places 7-12) ====
Rank	Name	Nation	Gap	Notes
7	Anastasiia Voinova	Russia		
8	Tania Calvo	Spain	+0.101	
9	Helena Casas	Spain	+0.181	
10	Katy Marchant	Great Britain	+0.208	
11	Katarzyna Kirschenstein	Poland	+0.260	
12	Urszula Los	Poland	+0.303	

==== Final (places 1-6) ====
Rank	Name	Nation	Gap	Notes
1st place, gold medalist(s)	Elis Ligtlee	Netherlands		
2nd place, silver medalist(s)	Virginie Cueff	France	+0.033	
3rd place, bronze medalist(s)	Ekaterina Gnidenko	Russia	+0.076	
4	Liubov Basova	Ukraine	+0.145	
5	Kristina Vogel	Germany	+0.148	
6	Olivia Montauban	France	+0.253	
