= 2011 UCI Track Cycling World Championships – Women's 500 m time trial =

Rainbow jersey

The Women's 500 m time trial at the 2011 UCI Track Cycling World Championships was held on March 23. 13 athletes participated in the contest.

== Results ==
The race was held at 19:00.

Rank	Name	Nation	Time
1st place, gold medalist(s)	Olga Panarina	Belarus	33.896
2nd place, silver medalist(s)	Sandie Clair	France	33.919
3rd place, bronze medalist(s)	Miriam Welte	Germany	34.496
4	Willy Kanis	Netherlands	34.657
5	Lee Wai Sze	Hong Kong	34.710
6	Lisandra Guerra	Cuba	34.722
7	Becky James	United Kingdom	35.035
8	Olga Streltsova	Russia	35.727
9	Kim Won-Gyeong	South Korea	36.120
10	Fatehah Mustapa	Malaysia	36.458
11	Angeliki Koutsonikoli	Greece	36.752
12	Ryoko Nakagawa	Japan	37.660
13	Luz Gaxiola	Mexico	38.442

== See also ==
- 2011 UCI Para-cycling Track World Championships – Women's time trial
- 2011 UCI Track Cycling World Championships
