= 2014 UCI Track Cycling World Championships – Women's keirin =

The Women's keirin at the 2014 UCI Track Cycling World Championships was held on 2 March 2014. 21 cyclists participated in the contest. After the 4 qualifying heats, the fastest rider in each heat advanced to the second round. The remaining riders then raced in 4 repechage heats, with the first 2 riders in each heat advancing to the second round along with the 4 that qualified before.

The first 3 riders from each of the 2 Second Round heats advanced to the Final and the remaining riders raced a consolation 7–12 final.

== Medalists ==
Gold	Kristina Vogel (GER)
Silver	Anna Meares (AUS)
Bronze	Becky James (GBR)

== Results ==
=== First round ===
The first round was held at 12:00.

==== Heat 1 ====
Rank	Name	Nation	Gap	Notes
1	Fatehah Mustapa	Malaysia		Q
2	Virginie Cueff	France	+0.111	
3	Daniela Gaxiola	Mexico	+0.207	
4	Elis Ligtlee	Netherlands	+0.233	
5	Becky James	Great Britain		REL

==== Heat 2 ====
Rank	Name	Nation	Gap	Notes
1	Kristina Vogel	Germany		Q
2	Lisandra Guerra	Cuba	+0.206	
3	Elena Brezhniva	Russia	+0.326	
4	Shanne Braspennincx	Netherlands	+0.415	
5	Helena Casas	Spain	+0.544	

==== Heat 3 ====
Rank	Name	Nation	Gap	Notes
1	Lee Wai Sze	Hong Kong		Q
2	Anna Meares	Australia	+0.013	
3	Sandie Clair	France	+0.860	
4	Jessica Varnish	Great Britain	+0.987	
5	Olena Tsyos	Ukraine	+1.537	

==== Heat 4 ====
Rank	Name	Nation	Gap	Notes
1	Stephanie Morton	Australia		Q
2	Ekaterina Gnidenko	Russia	+0.106	
3	Tania Calvo	Spain	+0.205	
4	Juliana Gaviria	Colombia	+0.298	
5	Kayono Maeda	Japan	+0.430	
6	Victoria Williamson	Great Britain	+0.587	

=== First round repechage ===
The first round repechage was held at 13:15.

==== Heat 1 ====
Rank	Name	Nation	Gap	Notes
1	Virginie Cueff	France		Q
2	Elena Brezhniva	Russia	+0.330	Q
3	Juliana Gaviria	Colombia	+0.445	
4	Olena Tsyos	Ukraine	+0.594	

==== Heat 2 ====
Rank	Name	Nation	Gap	Notes
1	Sandie Clair	France		Q
2	Lisandra Guerra	Cuba	+0.033	Q
3	Elis Ligtlee	Netherlands	+0.097	
4	Kayono Maeda	Japan	+0.347	

==== Heat 3 ====
Rank	Name	Nation	Gap	Notes
1	Anna Meares	Australia		Q
2	Becky James	Great Britain	+0.051	Q
3	Shanne Braspennincx	Netherlands	+0.488	
4	Tania Calvo	Spain	+0.740	

==== Heat 4 ====
Rank	Name	Nation	Gap	Notes
1	Daniela Gaxiola	Mexico		Q
2	Jessica Varnish	Great Britain	+0.003	Q
3	Ekaterina Gnidenko	Russia	+0.163	
4	Helena Casas	Spain	+0.454	
5	Victoria Williamson	Great Britain	+0.864	

=== Second round ===
The second round was held at 16:10.

==== Heat 1 ====
Rank	Name	Nation	Gap	Notes
1	Sandie Clair	France		Q
2	Anna Meares	Australia		Q
3	Elena Brezhniva	Russia		Q
4	Fatehah Mustapa	Malaysia		
5	Jessica Varnish	Great Britain		
6	Stephanie Morton	Australia		

==== Heat 2 ====
Rank	Name	Nation	Gap	Notes
1	Kristina Vogel	Germany		Q
2	Becky James	Great Britain		Q
3	Daniela Gaxiola	Mexico		Q
4	Lisandra Guerra	Cuba		
5	Lee Wai Sze	Hong Kong		
6	Virginie Cueff	France		

=== Finals ===
The Finals were held at 16:50.

==== Small final ====
Rank	Name	Nation	Gap	Notes
7	Lee Wai Sze	Hong Kong		
8	Fatehah Mustapa	Malaysia	+0.013	
9	Stephanie Morton	Australia	+0.226	
10	Virginie Cueff	France	+0.249	
11	Lisandra Guerra	Cuba	+0.344	
12	Jessica Varnish	Great Britain	+0.472	

==== Final ====
Rank	Name	Nation	Gap	Notes
1st place, gold medalist(s)	Kristina Vogel	Germany		
2nd place, silver medalist(s)	Anna Meares	Australia	+0.085	
3rd place, bronze medalist(s)	Becky James	Great Britain	+0.140	
4	Elena Brezhniva	Russia	+0.224	
5	Daniela Gaxiola	Mexico	+0.269	
6	Sandie Clair	France	+0.330	
