= 2012 European Track Championships – Women's keirin =

UEC European Champion jersey

The Women's keirin was held on 21 October 2012. 11 riders participated.

== Medalists ==
Gold	Simona Krupeckaitė (LTU)
Silver	Ekaterina Gnidenko (RUS)
Bronze	Elena Brezhniva (RUS)

== Results ==
=== Heats ===
First 3 riders in each heat qualified for the final, remainder went to the 7–11 final. It was held at 11:27.

==== Heat 1 ====
Rank	Name	Nation	Notes
1	Elena Brezhniva	Russia	Q
2	Olga Panarina	Belarus	Q
3	Sandie Clair	France	Q
4	Natalia Rutkowska	Poland	
5	Victoria Williamson	Great Britain	
6	Gintarė Gaivenytė	Lithuania	

==== Heat 2 ====
Rank	Name	Nation	Notes
1	Ekaterina Gnidenko	Russia	Q
2	Olivia Montauban	France	Q
3	Simona Krupeckaitė	Lithuania	Q
4	Małgorzata Wojtyra	Poland	
5	Volha Masiukovich	Belarus	

=== Finals ===
It was held at 18:01.

==== Final 7–11 places ====
Rank	Name	Nation	Notes
7	Małgorzata Wojtyra	Poland	
8	Volha Masiukovich	Belarus	
9	Victoria Williamson	Great Britain	
10	Gintarė Gaivenytė	Lithuania	
–	Natalia Rutkowska	Poland	DSQ

==== Final ====
Rank	Name	Nation	Notes
1st place, gold medalist(s)	Simona Krupeckaitė	Lithuania	
2nd place, silver medalist(s)	Ekaterina Gnidenko	Russia	
3rd place, bronze medalist(s)	Elena Brezhniva	Russia	
4	Olga Panarina	Belarus	
5	Sandie Clair	France	
6	Olivia Montauban	France	
