= 2013 UCI Track Cycling World Championships – Women's keirin =

Rainbow jersey

The Women's keirin at the 2013 UCI Track Cycling World Championships was held on February 24. 17 athletes participated in the contest. After the 3 qualifying heats, the fastest two riders in each heat advanced to the second round. The riders that did not advance to the second round, raced in 2 repechage heats. The fastest 3 riders in each heat advanced to the second round along with the 6 that qualified before.

The first 3 riders from each of the 2 Second Round heats advanced to the Final and the remaining riders raced a consolation 7–11 final.

== Medalists ==
| Gold | Becky James (GBR) |
| Silver | Gong Jinjie (CHN) |
| Bronze | Lisandra Guerra (CUB) |

== Results ==
=== First round ===
The heats were held at 11:00.

==== Heat 1 ====
| Rank | Name | Nation | Gap | Notes |
|---|---|---|---|---|
| 1 | Becky James | United Kingdom | | Q |
| 2 | Ekaterina Gnidenko | Russia | +0.095 | Q |
| 3 | Juliana Gaviria | Colombia | +0.112 | |
| 4 | Gong Jinjie | China | +0.145 | |
| 5 | Daniela Gaxiola González Luz | Mexico | +2.017 | |

==== Heat 2 ====
| Rank | Name | Nation | Gap | Notes |
|---|---|---|---|---|
| 1 | Kristina Vogel | Germany | | Q |
| 2 | Kaarle McCulloch | Australia | +0.175 | Q |
| 3 | Victoria Williamson | United Kingdom | +0.278 | |
| 4 | Sandie Clair | France | +0.290 | |
| 5 | Yelena Brezhniva | Russia | +0.381 | |
| 6 | Lisandra Guerra | Cuba | | REL |

==== Heat 3 ====
| Rank | Name | Nation | Gap | Notes |
|---|---|---|---|---|
| 1 | Lee Wai Sze | Hong Kong | | Q |
| 2 | Helena Casas Roige | Spain | +0.661 | Q |
| 3 | Olivia Montauban | France | +0.708 | |
| 4 | Stephanie Morton | Australia | | DNF |
| 5 | Miriam Welte | Germany | | DNF |
| | Guo Shuang | China | | DSQ |

=== First Round Repechage ===
The heats were held at 11:50.

==== Heat 1 ====
| Rank | Name | Nation | Gap | Notes |
|---|---|---|---|---|
| 1 | Sandie Clair | France | | Q |
| 2 | Juliana Gaviria | Colombia | +0.010 | Q |
| 3 | Stephanie Morton | Australia | +0.066 | Q |
| 4 | Yelena Brezhniva | Russia | +0.118 | |

==== Heat 2 ====
| Rank | Name | Nation | Gap | Notes |
|---|---|---|---|---|
| 1 | Lisandra Guerra | Cuba | | Q |
| 2 | Gong Jinjie | China | +0.056 | Q |
| 3 | Olivia Montauban | France | +0.082 | Q |
| 4 | Victoria Williamson | United Kingdom | +0.118 | |
| 5 | Daniela Gaxiola González Luz | Mexico | +0.372 | |

=== Second round ===
The heats were held at 15:10.

==== Heat 1 ====
| Rank | Name | Nation | Gap | Notes |
|---|---|---|---|---|
| 1 | Lisandra Guerra | Cuba | | Q |
| 2 | Becky James | United Kingdom | +0.022 | Q |
| 3 | Juliana Gaviria | Colombia | +0.206 | Q |
| 4 | Olivia Montauban | France | +0.238 | |
| 5 | Kaarle McCulloch | Australia | +0.350 | |
| 6 | Helena Casas Roige | Spain | +0.750 | |

==== Heat 2 ====
| Rank | Name | Nation | Gap | Notes |
|---|---|---|---|---|
| 1 | Kristina Vogel | Germany | | Q |
| 2 | Lee Wai Sze | Hong Kong | +0.008 | Q |
| 3 | Gong Jinjie | China | +0.082 | Q |
| 4 | Ekaterina Gnidenko | Russia | +0.176 | |
| 5 | Sandie Clair | France | +0.628 | |
| | Stephanie Morton | Australia | | DNS |

=== Finals ===
The finals were held at 16:35.

==== Small Final ====
| Rank | Name | Nation | Gap | Notes |
|---|---|---|---|---|
| 7 | Sandie Clair | France | | |
| 8 | Ekaterina Gnidenko | Russia | +0.071 | |
| 9 | Helena Casas Roige | Spain | +0.108 | |
| 10 | Olivia Montauban | France | +0.133 | |
| 11 | Kaarle McCulloch | Australia | +0.271 | |

==== Final ====
| Rank | Name | Nation | Gap | Notes |
|---|---|---|---|---|
| 1st place, gold medalist(s) | Becky James | United Kingdom | | |
| 2nd place, silver medalist(s) | Gong Jinjie | China | +0.116 | |
| 3rd place, bronze medalist(s) | Lisandra Guerra | Cuba | +0.121 | |
| 4 | Lee Wai Sze | Hong Kong | +0.149 | |
| 5 | Juliana Gaviria | Colombia | +0.182 | |
| 6 | Kristina Vogel | Germany | | DNF |
