= 2009 UCI Track Cycling World Championships – Women's 500 m time trial =

Rainbow jersey

The Women's 500m Time Trial is one of the 9 women's events at the 2009 UCI Track Cycling World Championships, held in Pruszków, Poland.

23 Cyclists from 20 countries participated in the contest. The Final was held on 25 March.

== World record ==
World Record
WR	33.588	Anna Meares (AUS)	Mallorca (Spain)	31 March 2007

== Final ==
Rank	Name	250m	Time	Speed (km/h)
Rank	Name	250m	250-500	Speed (km/h)
	Simona Krupeckaitė (LTU)	18.841 (1)	33.296 WR	54.060
	Simona Krupeckaitė (LTU)		14.455 (1)	54.060
	Anna Meares (AUS)	18.977 (2)	33.796	53.260
	Anna Meares (AUS)		14.819 (3)	53.260
	Victoria Pendleton (GBR)	19.333 (7)	34.102	52.782
	Victoria Pendleton (GBR)		14.769 (2)	52.782
4	Sandie Clair (FRA)	19.072 (4)	34.114	52.764
4	Sandie Clair (FRA)		15.042 (6)	52.764
5	Willy Kanis (NED)	19.327 (6)	34.258	52.542
5	Willy Kanis (NED)		14.931 (5)	52.542
6	Kaarle McCulloch (AUS)	19.161 (5)	34.276	52.514
6	Kaarle McCulloch (AUS)		15.115 (7)	52.514
7	Lisandra Guerra (CUB)	19.070 (3)	34.358	52.389
7	Lisandra Guerra (CUB)		15.288 (11)	52.389
8	Olga Panarina (BLR)	19.629 (10)	34.557	52.087
8	Olga Panarina (BLR)		14.928 (4)	52.087
9	Miriam Welte (GER)	20.159 (16)	34.827	51.684
9	Miriam Welte (GER)		15.119 (8)	51.684
10	Yvonne Hijgenaar (NED)		35.054	51.349
11	Kristina Vogel (GER)		35.278	51.023
12	Elisa Frisoni (ITA)	20.114 (15)	35.409	50.834
12	Elisa Frisoni (ITA)		15.295 (12)	50.834
13	Gong Jinjie (CHN)	19.554 (9)	35.442	50.787
13	Gong Jinjie (CHN)		15.888 (18)	50.787
14	Anna Blyth (GBR)	20.024 (12)	35.443	50.785
14	Anna Blyth (GBR)		15.419 (13)	50.785
15	Olga Streltsova (RUS)	20.081 (14)	35.710	50.406
15	Olga Streltsova (RUS)		15.629 (16)	50.406
16	Huong Ting Ying (TPE)	20.488 (21)	35.924	50.105
16	Huong Ting Ying (TPE)		15.743 (18)	50.105
17	Zheng Lulu (CHN)	20.340 (20)	35.965	50.048
17	Zheng Lulu (CHN)		15.480 (14)	50.048
18	Diana García (COL)	20.289 (19)	36.034	49.952
18	Diana García (COL)		15.745 (17)	49.952
19	Lee Wai See (HKG)	20.193 (17)	36.103	50.857
19	Lee Wai See (HKG)		15.910 (19)	50.857
20	Helena Casas (ESP)	20.257 (18)	36.319	49.560
20	Helena Casas (ESP)		15.623 (15)	49.560
21	Aleksandra Drejgier (POL)	20.068 (13)	36.475	49.348
21	Aleksandra Drejgier (POL)		16.010 (20)	49.348
22	Maneephan Jutatip (THA)	20.565 (22)	36.673	49.082
22	Maneephan Jutatip (THA)		16.240 (21)	49.082
23	Cinthia Martínez (URU)	21.887 (23)	38.652	46.570
23	Cinthia Martínez (URU)		16.764 (23)	46.570
