= Cycling at the 2016 Summer Olympics – Women's keirin =

Women's Keirin at the Games of the XXXI Olympiad
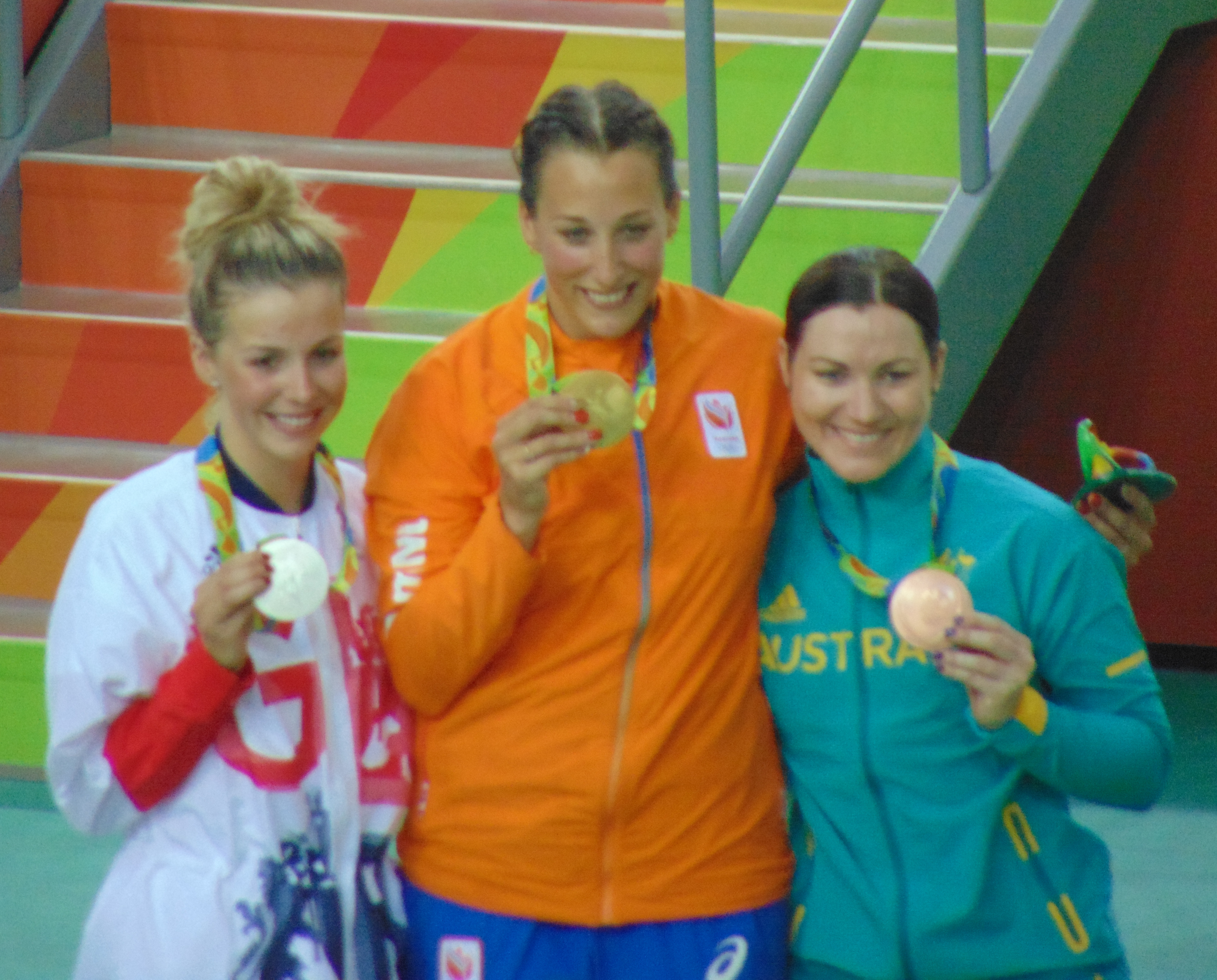
- Left-right: James, Ligtlee, Meares
- Venue: Rio Olympic Velodrome
- Date: 13 August
- Winning time: 11.217

Medalists
1st place, gold medalist(s)		Elis Ligtlee	Netherlands
2nd place, silver medalist(s)		Becky James	Great Britain
3rd place, bronze medalist(s)		Anna Meares	Australia

The women's Keirin at the 2016 Olympic Games in Rio de Janeiro took place at the Rio Olympic Velodrome on 13 August. This was the second time that the event was held at the Olympics, after making its debut in London four years prior.

The event was won by Elis Ligtlee from the Netherlands, silver went to Becky James from Great Britain and Australia's Anna Meares won bronze.

The previous title holder, Britain's Victoria Pendleton, did not compete as she announced her retirement at the end of the 2012 London Games.

The medals were presented by Timothy Fok, IOC member, Hong Kong and Brian Cookson, President of the UCI.

== Competition format ==
The Keirin races involved 5.5 laps of the track behind a motorcycle, followed by a 2.5 lap sprint to the finish. The tournament consisted of preliminary heats and repechages, a semi-finals round, and the finals. The heats and repechages narrowed the field to 12. The semi-finals divided the remaining 12 into six finalists. The finals round also included a ranking race for 7th to 12th place.

== Schedule ==
All times are Brasília Time

Date	Time	Round
Saturday 13 August 2016	16:00	Round 1, repechage, round 2 and final

== Results ==
=== First round ===
Top two in each heat qualified directly for the second round; the remainder advanced to the first round repechages.

==== Heat 1 ====
Rank	Rider	Time	Note
1	Kristina Vogel (GER)		Q
2	Anna Meares (AUS)	+0.002	Q
3	Martha Bayona (COL)	+0.066	
4	Anastasia Voynova (RUS)	+0.186	
5	Gong Jinjie (CHN)	+0.368	
6	Monique Sullivan (CAN)	+0.411	

==== Heat 3 ====
Rank	Rider	Time	Note
1	Becky James (GBR)		Q
2	Lee Hye-jin (KOR)	+0.017	Q
3	Natasha Hansen (NZL)	+0.018	
4	Helena Casas (ESP)	+0.092	
5	Stephanie Morton (AUS)	+0.111	
6	Kate O'Brien (CAN)	+0.244	
7	Miriam Welte (GER)	+0.477	

==== Heat 2 ====
Rank	Rider	Time	Note
1	Lee Wai Sze (HKG)		Q
2	Zhong Tianshi (CHN)	+0.212	Q
3	Daria Shmeleva (RUS)	+1.267	
4	Laurine van Riessen (NED)	+3.929	
5	Tania Calvo (ESP)	DNF	
6	Virginie Cueff (FRA)	DNF	
7	Olivia Podmore (NZL)	DNF	

==== Heat 4 ====
Rank	Rider	Time	Note
1	Elis Ligtlee (NED)		Q
2	Simona Krupeckaitė (LTU)	+0.010	Q
3	Lisandra Guerra (CUB)	+0.100	
4	Olga Ismayilova (AZE)	+0.256	
5	Shannon McCurley (IRL)	+0.431	
6	Sandie Clair (FRA)	+0.555	
7	Liubov Basova (UKR)	REL^{[R1]}	

- ^{^{R1}} Relegation for riding on the blue band during the sprint

=== First round Repechages ===
The winner of each heat qualified for the second round.

==== Heat 1 ====
Rank	Rider	Time	Note
1	Martha Bayona (COL)		Q
2	Stephanie Morton (AUS)	+0.085	
3	Virginie Cueff (FRA)	+0.144	
4	Olga Ismayilova (AZE)	+0.145	

==== Heat 3 ====
Rank	Rider	Time	Note
1	Laurine van Riessen (NED)		Q
2	Natasha Hansen (NZL)	+0.001	
3	Gong Jinjie (CHN)	+0.129	
4	Sandie Clair (FRA)	+0.800	
5	Miriam Welte (GER)	+1.669	

==== Heat 2 ====
Rank	Rider	Time	Note
1	Liubov Basova (UKR)		Q
2	Daria Shmeleva (RUS)	+0.116	
3	Helena Casas (ESP)	+0.124	
4	Tania Calvo (ESP)	+0.199	
5	Monique Sullivan (CAN)	+0.306	

==== Heat 4 ====
Rank	Rider	Time	Note
1	Anastasia Voynova (RUS)		Q
2	Kate O'Brien (CAN)	+0.175	
3	Lisandra Guerra (CUB)	+0.260	
4	Shannon McCurley (IRL)	+0.268	
5	Olivia Podmore (NZL)	+0.423	

=== Second round ===
First three riders in each semi qualified for the final; the remainder advanced to the small final (for places 7-12).

==== Heat 1 ====
Rank	Rider	Time	Note
1	Kristina Vogel (GER)		Q
2	Elis Ligtlee (NED)	+0.398	Q
3	Anastasia Voynova (RUS)	+0.533	Q
4	Lee Hye-jin (KOR)	+1.046	
5	Zhong Tianshi (CHN)	REL^{[R2]}	
6	Martha Bayona (COL)	DNF	

==== Heat 2 ====
Rank	Rider	Time	Note
1	Anna Meares (AUS)		Q
2	Becky James (GBR)	+0.011	Q
3	Liubov Basova (UKR)	+0.041	Q
4	Laurine van Riessen (NED)	+0.165	
5	Simona Krupeckaitė (LTU)	+0.192	
6	Lee Wai Sze (HKG)	DNF	

- ^{^{R2}}Relegation for entering the sprinter's lane when the opponent was already there

=== Finals ===
The final classification is determined in the ranking finals.

==== Final (places 7-12) ====
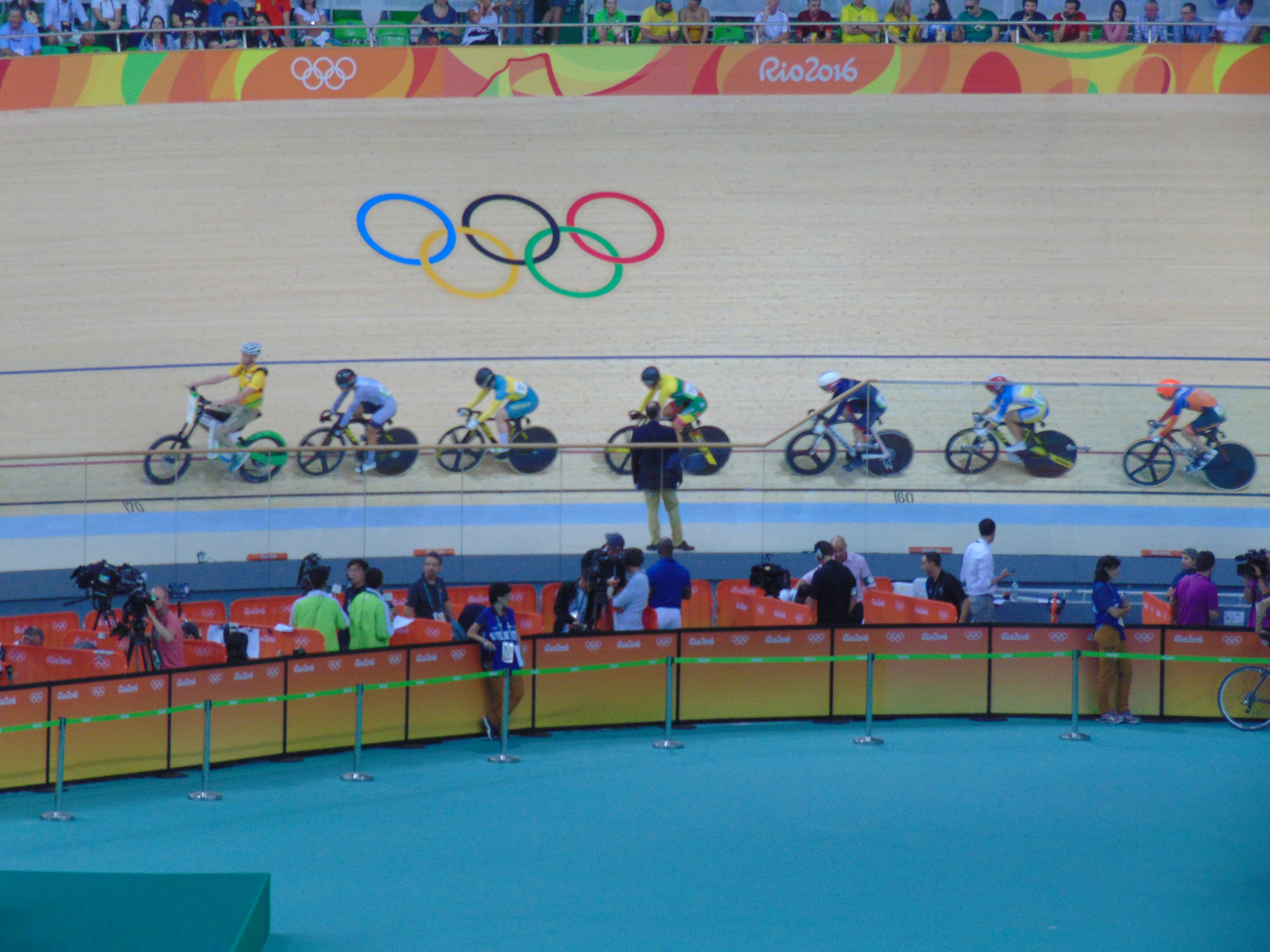
Final 7th–12th

Rank	Rider	Time	Note
7	Lee Wai Sze (HKG)		
8	Lee Hye-jin (KOR)	+0.059	
9	Laurine van Riessen (NED)	+0.140	
10	Martha Bayona (COL)	+0.220	
11	Zhong Tianshi (CHN)	+0.445	
12	Simona Krupeckaitė (LTU)	+0.464	

==== Final (places 1-6) ====
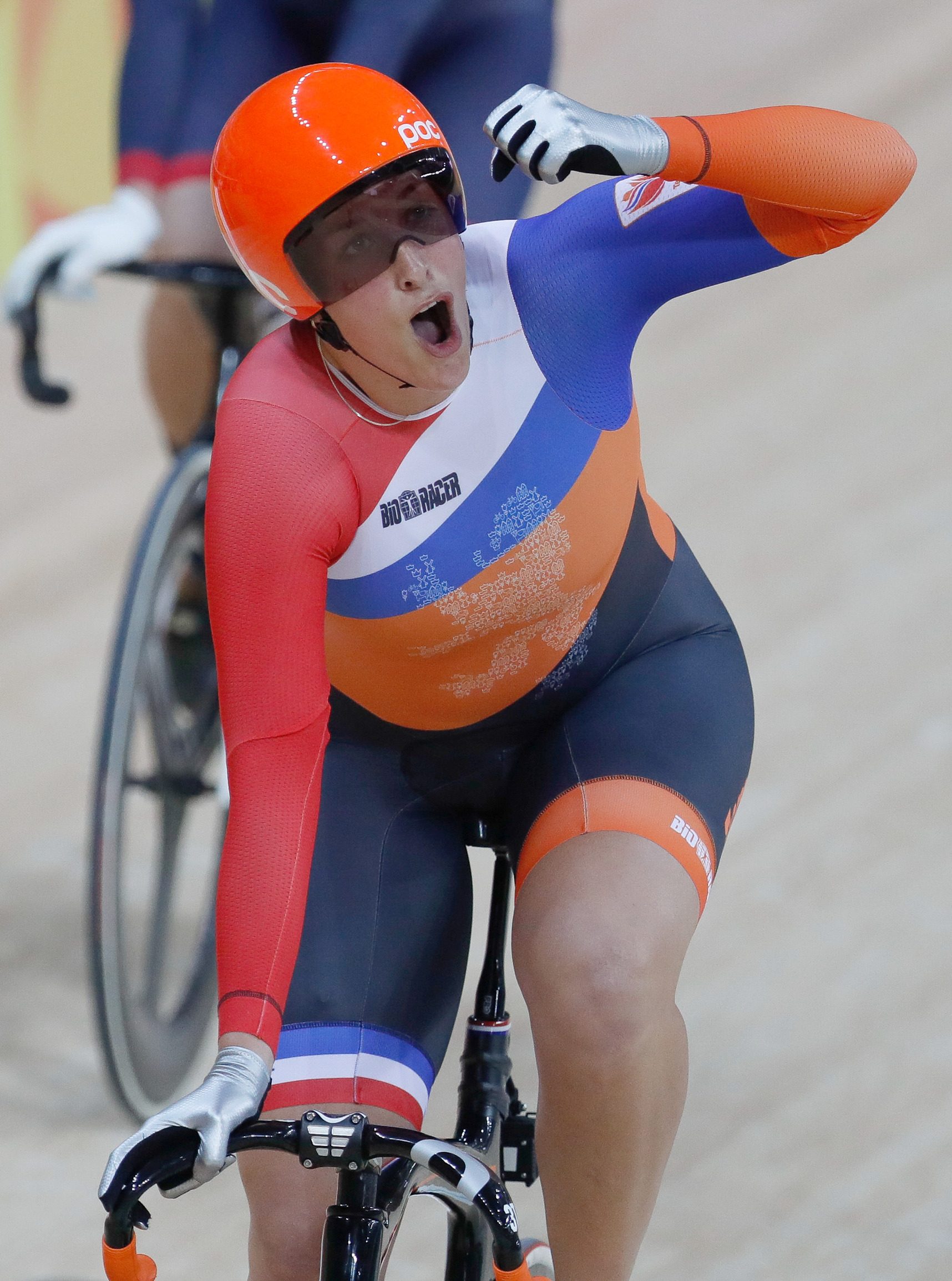
Elis Ligtlee winning the final

Rank	Rider	Time	Note
1st place, gold medalist(s)	Elis Ligtlee (NED)		
2nd place, silver medalist(s)	Becky James (GBR)	+0.033	
3rd place, bronze medalist(s)	Anna Meares (AUS)	+0.038	
4	Anastasia Voynova (RUS)	+0.111	
5	Liubov Basova (UKR)	+0.152	
6	Kristina Vogel (GER)	+0.163	
