= 2010 UCI Track Cycling World Championships – Women's 500 m time trial =

Rainbow jersey

The Women's 500m Time Trial is one of the nine women's events at the 2010 UCI Track Cycling World Championships, held in Ballerup, Denmark.

21 Cyclists from 15 countries participated in the contest. The Final was held on 24 March.

== World record ==
World Record
WR	33.296	Simona Krupeckaitė (LTU)	Pruszków (Poland)	25 March 2009

== Final ==
Rank	Name	Nation	Time
1st place, gold medalist(s)	Anna Meares	Australia	33.381
2nd place, silver medalist(s)	Simona Krupeckaitė	Lithuania	33.462
3rd place, bronze medalist(s)	Olga Panarina	Belarus	33.779
4	Willy Kanis	Netherlands	33.801
5	Sandie Clair	France	33.992
6	Kaarle McCulloch	Australia	34.349
7	Miriam Welte	Germany	34.407
8	Gong Jinjie	China	34.538
9	Lisandra Guerra	Cuba	34.674
10	Lin Junhong	China	34.803
11	Lee Wai Sze	Hong Kong	34.974
12	Jessica Varnish	Great Britain	34.992
13	Virginie Cueff	France	35.017
14	Monique Sullivan	Canada	35.334
15	Yvonne Hijgenaar	Netherlands	35.418
16	Becky James	Great Britain	35.515
17	Olga Streltsova	Russia	35.601
18	Gintarė Gaivenytė	Lithuania	35.603
19	Helena Casas Roige	Spain	35.778
20	Renata Dąbrowska	Poland	35.864
21	Elisa Frisoni	Italy	36.255
