= 2010 UCI Track Cycling World Championships – Women's keirin =

Rainbow jersey

The Women's Keirin is one of the 9 women's events at the 2010 UCI Track Cycling World Championships, held in Ballerup, Denmark on 28 March 2010.

21 Cyclists from 15 countries participated in the contest. After the 3 qualifying heats, the fastest 2 riders in each heat advance to the second round. The remaining ones face a first round repechage.

The riders that did not advance to the second round race in 3 repechage heats. The first 2 riders in each heat advance to the second round along with the 6 that qualified before.

The first 3 riders from each of the 2 Second Round heats advance to the Final and the remaining will race a consolation 7-12 final.

== Results ==
=== First round ===
Rank	Heat	Name	Nation	Notes
1	1	Emily Rosemond	Australia	Q
2	1	Guo Shuang	China	Q
3	1	Jessica Varnish	Great Britain	
4	1	Lisandra Guerra	Cuba	
5	1	Miriam Welte	Germany	
6	1	Lyubov Shulika	Ukraine	
	1	Elisa Frisoni	Italy	DNF
1	2	Victoria Pendleton	Great Britain	Q
2	2	Clara Sanchez	France	Q
3	2	Kaarle McCulloch	Australia	
4	2	Christin Muche	Germany	
5	2	Monique Sullivan	Canada	
6	2	Yvonne Hijgenaar	Netherlands	
7	2	Lee Wai Sze	Hong Kong	
1	3	Simona Krupeckaitė	Lithuania	Q
2	3	Anna Meares	Australia	Q
3	3	Renata Dąbrowska	Poland	
4	3	Willy Kanis	Netherlands	
5	3	Sandie Clair	France	
6	3	Olga Panarina	Belarus	
7	3	Victoria Baranova	Russia	

=== First round repechage ===
Rank	Heat	Name	Nation	Notes
1	1	Willy Kanis	Netherlands	Q
2	1	Monique Sullivan	Canada	Q
3	1	Jessica Varnish	Great Britain	
4	1	Lyubov Shulika	Ukraine	
5	1	Victoria Baranova	Russia	
1	2	Christin Muche	Germany	Q
2	2	Kaarle McCulloch	Australia	Q
3	2	Sandie Clair	France	
4	2	Yvonne Hijgenaar	Netherlands	
5	2	Elisa Frisoni	Italy	
1	3	Olga Panarina	Belarus	Q
2	3	Miriam Welte	Germany	Q
3	3	Renata Dąbrowska	Poland	
4	3	Lisandra Guerra	Cuba	
5	3	Lee Wai Sze	Hong Kong	

=== Second round ===
Rank	Heat	Name	Nation	Notes
1	1	Clara Sanchez	France	Q
2	1	Simona Krupeckaitė	Lithuania	Q
3	1	Olga Panarina	Belarus	Q
4	1	Emily Rosemond	Australia	
5	1	Monique Sullivan	Canada	
6	1	Christin Muche	Germany	
1	2	Victoria Pendleton	Great Britain	Q
2	2	Kaarle McCulloch	Australia	Q
3	2	Miriam Welte	Germany	Q
4	2	Guo Shuang	China	
5	2	Willy Kanis	Netherlands	
6	2	Anna Meares	Australia	

=== Final 7-12 places ===
Rank	Name	Nation	Notes
7	Anna Meares	Australia	
8	Guo Shuang	China	
9	Monique Sullivan	Canada	
10	Christin Muche	Germany	
	Emily Rosemond	Australia	REL
	Willy Kanis	Netherlands	REL

=== Final ===
Rank	Name	Nation	Notes
1st place, gold medalist(s)	Simona Krupeckaitė	Lithuania	
2nd place, silver medalist(s)	Victoria Pendleton	Great Britain	
3rd place, bronze medalist(s)	Olga Panarina	Belarus	
4	Kaarle McCulloch	Australia	
5	Miriam Welte	Germany	
6	Clara Sanchez	France	
