= 2010 European Track Championships – Women's keirin =

UEC European Champion jersey

The women's keirin was one of the five women's events at the 2010 European Track Championships, held in Pruszków, Poland.

Twenty-one cyclists participated in the contest.

The event was held on November 7.

== First round ==
The first two riders in each heat qualified for the second round, the remainder to first round repechage.

=== Heat 1 ===
Rank	Name	Nation	Notes
1	Sandie Clair	France	Q
2	Simona Krupeckaitė	Lithuania	Q
3	Angeliki Koutsonikoli	Greece	
4	Elisa Frisoni	Italy	
5	Helena Casas	Spain	
6	Willy Kanis	Netherlands	
7	Olga Streltsova	Russia	

=== Heat 2 ===
Rank	Name	Nation	Notes
1	Victoria Pendleton	Great Britain	Q
2	Clara Sanchez	France	Q
3	Jessica Varnish	Great Britain	
4	Dimitra Patapi	Greece	
5	Gintarė Gaivenytė	Lithuania	
6	Olena Tsyos	Ukraine	
7	Mary Costelloe	Ireland	

=== Heat 3 ===
Rank	Name	Nation	Notes
1	Kristina Vogel	Germany	Q
2	Ekaterina Gnidenko	Russia	Q
3	Tania Calvo	Spain	
4	Olga Panarina	Belarus	
5	Miriam Welte	Germany	
6	Lyubov Shulika	Ukraine	
–	Yvonne Hijgenaar	Netherlands	

== First Round Repechage ==
First 2 rider in each heat qualified for the second round.

=== Heat 1 ===
Rank	Name	Nation	Notes
1	Willy Kanis	Netherlands	Q
2	Olga Panarina	Belarus	Q
3	Angeliki Koutsonikoli	Greece	
4	Gintarė Gaivenytė	Lithuania	

=== Heat 2 ===
Rank	Name	Nation	Notes
1	Miriam Welte	Germany	Q
2	Jessica Varnish	Great Britain	Q
3	Olga Streltsova	Russia	
4	Elisa Frisoni	Italy	

=== Heat 3 ===
Rank	Name	Nation	Notes
1	Lyubov Shulika	Ukraine	Q
2	Tania Calvo	Spain	Q
3	Helena Casas	Spain	
4	Dimitra Patapi	Greece	
5	Olena Tsyos	Ukraine	

== Second round ==
First 3 riders in each heat qualified for the final 1- 6 and the others to final 7 - 12.

=== Heat 1 ===
Rank	Name	Nation	Notes
1	Clara Sanchez	France	Q
2	Sandie Clair	France	Q
3	Lyubov Shulika	Ukraine	Q
4	Ekaterina Gnidenko	Russia	
5	Willy Kanis	Netherlands	
6	Jessica Varnish	Great Britain	

=== Heat 2 ===
Rank	Name	Nation	Notes
1	Simona Krupeckaitė	Lithuania	Q
2	Victoria Pendleton	Great Britain	Q
3	Olga Panarina	Belarus	Q
4	Kristina Vogel	Germany	
5	Miriam Welte	Germany	
6	Tania Calvo	Spain	

== Finals ==
=== Final 7-12 places ===
Rank	Name	Nation	Notes
8	Ekaterina Gnidenko	Russia	
7	Kristina Vogel	Germany	
9	Miriam Welte	Germany	
10	Tania Calvo	Spain	
11	Willy Kanis	Netherlands	
–	Jessica Varnish	Great Britain	DNF

=== Final ===
Rank	Name	Nation	Notes
1st place, gold medalist(s)	Olga Panarina	Belarus	
2nd place, silver medalist(s)	Simona Krupeckaitė	Lithuania	
3rd place, bronze medalist(s)	Lyubov Shulika	Ukraine	
4	Sandie Clair	France	
5	Victoria Pendleton	Great Britain	
6	Clara Sanchez	France	
