= Cinthia Martínez =

Uruguayan track cyclist

Cinthia Martinez
Personal information
- Born: 14 January 1989 (age 37)

Cycling career
- Sport: Cycling
- Discipline: Track cycling
- Role: Rider
- Rider type: sprinter

Professional team
- 2008-2009: (Spain) Calapie-Reyno de Navarra

Cinthia Martinez (born 14 January 1989) is a Uruguayan female track cyclist, and part of the national team. She competed in the 500 m time trial event at the 2009 UCI Track Cycling World Championships.
