= Tim Kennaugh =

Personal information
- Full name: Timothy Craig Kennaugh
- Born: 28 November 1991 (age 34) Isle of Man

Cycling career
- Sport: Cycling
- Current team: Great Britain
- Disciplines: Road, Track
- Role: Rider, coach

Amateur team
- -: Manx Road Club

Professional team
- 2012: Rapha Condor–Sharp

Timothy Craig Kennaugh (born 28 November 1991) is a Manx cycling coach and former racing cyclist.

== Biography ==
Born in Douglas, Isle of Man, Tim used to have a strong interest in football but Kennaugh was quick to follow in the footsteps of his older brother Peter Kennaugh, he was selected to ride for the British Talent Team in 2007 before becoming a member of British Cyclings Olympic Development Programme.

In 2009, he became one of the youngest riders to ever win the Manx National Road Race Championships. On 14 October 2009 it was confirmed that Kennaugh was to become a member of the Olympic Academy.

Kennaugh's riding career was cut short due to chronic thyroid disease. Subsequently, he remained with his former team Rapha Condor-JLT as a soigneur. He also became a coach, guiding Ed Laverack to the British National Under-23 Road Race title in 2014, and was subsequently appointed as an Assistant Team Manager with the renamed JLT-Condor squad for 2015 and as the team's Performance Manager for 2016. He left the team for 2018, joining EF Education First–Drapac p/b Cannondale.

== Palmarès ==
2009
1st Manx National Road Race Championships
1st Gorey 3-day, Ireland

1st Stage 1 Gorey 3-day
1st Stage 3 Gorey 3-day, Gorey
2nd Stage 4 Gorey 3-day, Tallaght

1st Junior Tour of Wales

3rd Points classification, Junior Tour of Wales

2nd Team pursuit, 2009 European Track Championships - Junior
3rd Points race, 2009 European Track Championships - Junior
2nd Pursuit, British National Track Championships - Junior
2nd British National Road Race Championships - Junior
