= Pawel Brylowski =

Polish cyclist (born 1989)

Personal information
- Born: 29 June 1989 (age 37) Kartuzy, Poland

Cycling career
- Sport: Cycling
- Current team: Retired
- Disciplines: Track; Road; Mountain biking
- Role: Rider
- Rider type: Endurance

Amateur teams
- 2010: GKS Cartusia Kartuzy
- 2011: ALKS Steel Grudziadz
- 2012–2013: Bank BGZ Team

Professional team
- 2014–2015: ActiveJet

Pawel Brylowski (born 29 June 1989) is a Polish former cyclist, who competed in track cycling, road bicycle racing and mountain bike racing.

Brylowski started cycling when 14, when introduced to the sport via a friend and joined a team based in his birth town of Kartuzy. In 2009, Brylowski won the bronze medal in the team pursuit at the 2009 UEC European Track Championships, setting a national record for the individual pursuit in Minsk as well. He competed in the team pursuit event at the 2010 UCI Track Cycling World Championships. In 2013, he was part of the team that won the Polish National Team pursuit title and the Polish National Madison Championship. In road racing, he finished second in the under-23 race at the 2011 Polish National Time Trial Championships, and sixth at the 2015 Memorial Grundmanna I Wizowskiego.
