= Konstantinos Karageorgos =

Greek cyclist (born 1991)

Personal information
- Born: 22 March 1991 (age 35)

Cycling career
- Sport: Cycling
- Discipline: Track cycling
- Role: Rider
- Rider type: sprinter

Konstantinos Karageorgos (born 22 March 1991) is a Greek male track cyclist, riding for the national team. He competed in the sprint event at the 2010 UCI Track Cycling World Championships.
