= Ryoko Nakagawa =

Japanese cyclist

Personal information
- Born: 29 May 1984 (age 42)

Cycling career
- Sport: Cycling
- Discipline: Track cycling
- Role: Rider
- Rider type: 500 m time trial team sprint

Ryoko Nakagawa (中川 諒子, Nakagawa Ryōko; born 29 May 1984) is a Japanese female track cyclist. She competed in the 500 m time trial and team sprint event at the 2011 UCI Track Cycling World Championships. She is also a professional keirin cyclist.

== Major results ==
2013
2nd Sprint, ACC Track Asia Cup – Thailand Round
2014
3rd Keirin, Japan Track Cup 1
