= 2012 European Track Championships – Women's sprint =

UEC European Champion jersey

The Women's sprint was held on 20 October 2012. 8 riders participated.

== Medalists ==
Gold	Olga Panarina (BLR)
Silver	Anastasiia Voinova (RUS)
Bronze	Simona Krupeckaitė (LTU)

== Results ==
=== Qualifying ===
It was held at 10:40.

Rank	Name	Nation	Time	Notes
1	Olga Panarina	Belarus	11.046	
2	Simona Krupeckaitė	Lithuania	11.207	
3	Anastasiia Voinova	Russia	11.418	
4	Olivia Montauban	France	11.584	
5	Sandie Clair	France	11.593	
6	Elena Brezhniva	Russia	11.606	
7	Victoria Williamson	Great Britain	11.668	
8	Gintarė Gaivenytė	Lithuania	11.949	

=== Quarterfinals ===
The races were held at 12:30 and 13:14.

Heat	Rank	Name	Nation	Race 1	Race 2	Decider	Notes
1	1	Olga Panarina	Belarus	12.150	11.746		Q
1	2	Gintarė Gaivenytė	Lithuania				
2	1	Simona Krupeckaitė	Lithuania	12.173	12.038		Q
2	2	Victoria Williamson	Great Britain				
3	1	Anastasiia Voinova	Russia	12.226	11.779		Q
3	2	Elena Brezhniva	Russia				
4	1	Olivia Montauban	France	11.862	12.015		Q
4	2	Sandie Clair	France				

=== Race for 5th–8th Places ===
It was held at 20:53.

Rank	Name	Nation	Time
5	Victoria Williamson	Great Britain	12.670
6	Sandie Clair	France	
7	Elena Brezhniva	Russia	
8	Gintarė Gaivenytė	Lithuania	

=== Semifinals ===
The races were held at 19:30, 20:22 and 20:47.

Heat	Rank	Name	Nation	Race 1	Race 2	Decider	Notes
1	1	Olga Panarina	Belarus	11.721	11.627		Q
1	2	Olivia Montauban	France				
2	1	Anastasiia Voinova	Russia	11.576		11.719	Q
2	2	Simona Krupeckaitė	Lithuania		11.919		

=== Finals ===
The races were held at 21:06 and 21:33.

Rank	Name	Nation	Race 1	Race 2	Decider
Gold Medal Races
1st place, gold medalist(s)	Olga Panarina	Belarus	11.775	11.664	
2nd place, silver medalist(s)	Anastasiia Voinova	Russia			
Bronze Medal Races
3rd place, bronze medalist(s)	Simona Krupeckaitė	Lithuania	11.818	11.879	
4	Olivia Montauban	France			
