= Park Eun-mi =

South Korean cyclist

Personal information
- Born: 6 July 1987 (age 39)

Cycling career
- Sport: Cycling
- Discipline: Track cycling
- Role: Rider
- Rider type: sprinter

Park Eun-mi (born 6 July 1987) is a South Korean female track cyclist. She competed in three events at the 2011 UCI Track Cycling World Championships.
