= Olga Ismayilova =

Belarusian-Azerbaijani cyclist

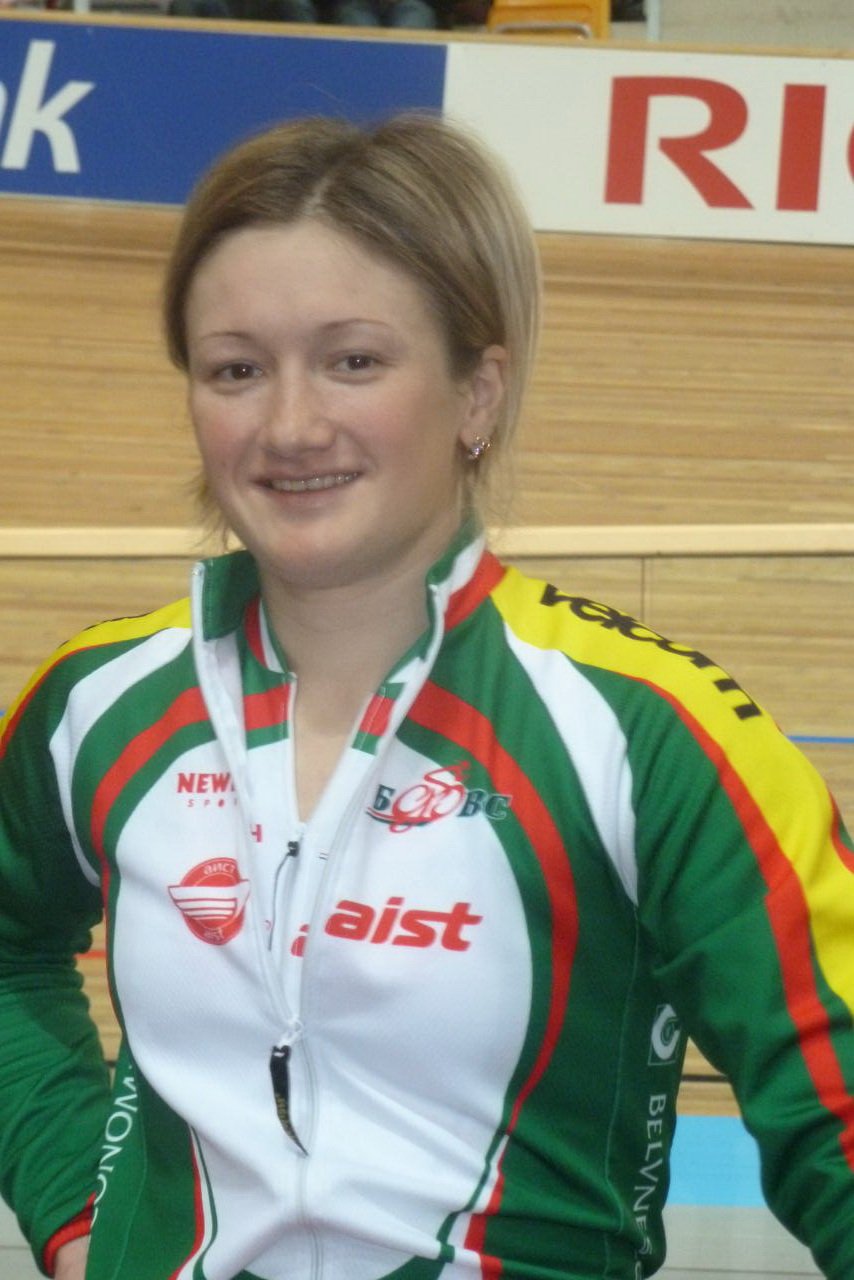
- Olga Ismayilova

Personal information
- Full name: Olga Yuryevna Ismayilova
- Born: 16 September 1985 (age 41) Soviet Union

Cycling career
- Sport: Cycling
- Discipline: Track
- Role: Rider
- Rider type: Sprinter
Medal record
Representing Belarus
Women's Track cyclist
World Championships
Gold medal – first place	2011 Apeldoorn	500 m time trial
Silver medal – second place	2011 Apeldoorn	Keirin
Bronze medal – third place	2010 Ballerup	500 m time trial
Bronze medal – third place	2010 Ballerup	Keirin
European Championships
Gold medal – first place	2010 Pruszków	Keirin
Gold medal – first place	2012 Panevėžys	Sprint
Silver medal – second place	2011 Apeldoorn	Sprint

Olga Yuryevna Ismayilova (née Panarina; born 16 September 1985) is a Belarusian-Azerbaijani track cyclist, specialising in the sprint disciplines. Originally representing Belarus, she won two bronze medals at the 2010 UCI Track Cycling World Championships: in the 500 m time trial and the keirin, having finished fourth in the sprint in 2009. She has represented Azerbaijan since 2016. She notably competed for Azerbaijan at the 2016 Summer Olympics, in the women's sprint and keirin events, but did not advance.

== Palmarès ==
Date	Placing	Event	Competition	Location	Country
24 March 2010	3rd place, bronze medalist(s)	500 m time trial	World Championships	Ballerup	Denmark
28 March 2010	3rd place, bronze medalist(s)	Keirin	World Championships	Ballerup	Denmark
23 March 2011	1st place, gold medalist(s)	500 m time trial	World Championships	Apeldoorn	Netherlands
27 March 2011	2nd place, silver medalist(s)	Keirin	World Championships	Apeldoorn	Netherlands

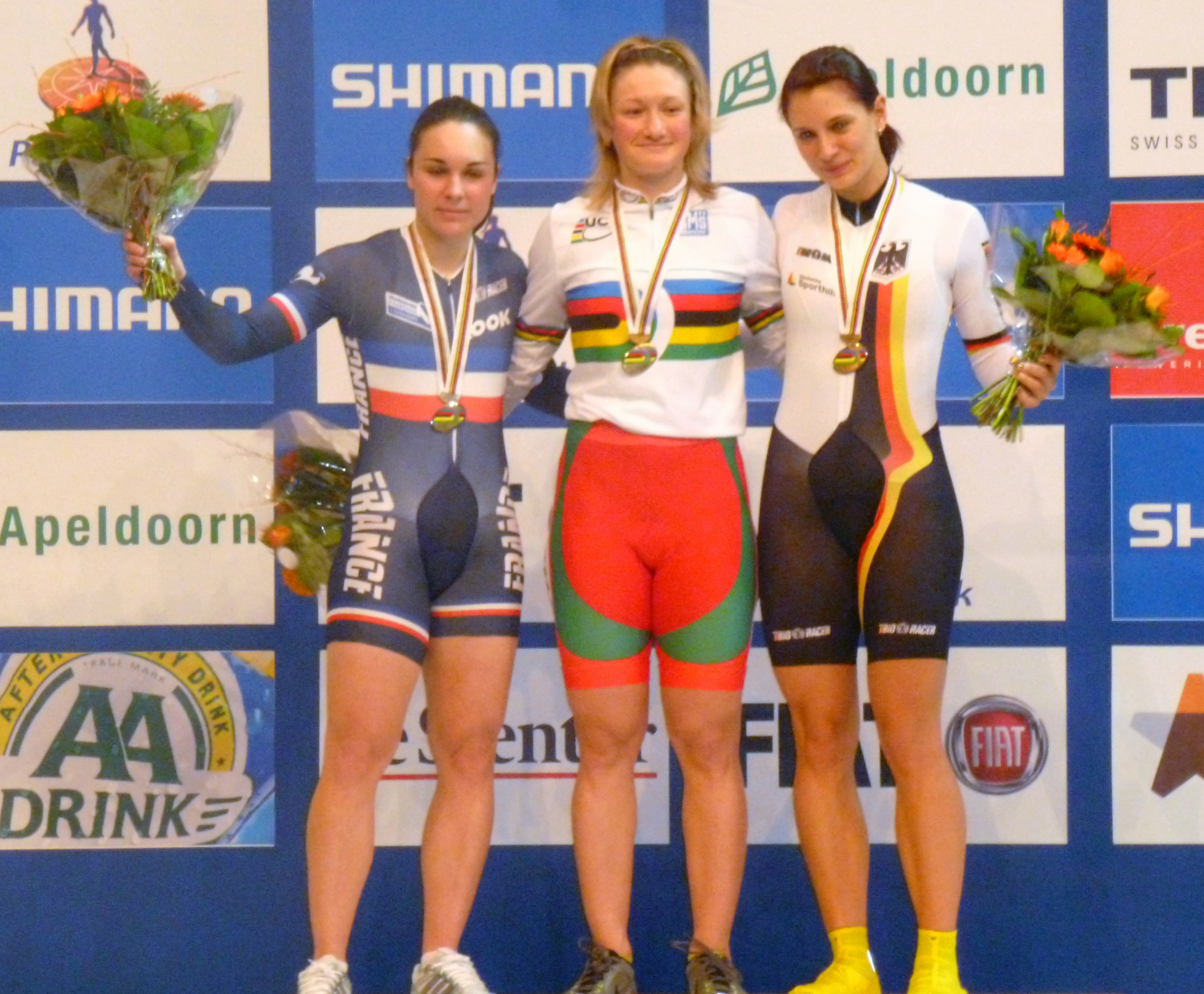
Panarina (centre) with Sandie Clair (left) and Miriam Welte, after winning the Women's 500 m time trial at the 2011 World Championships.

2014
GP Sprint of South Moravia

1st Keirin
1st Sprint

International Track Women & Men

1st Sprint
2nd Keirin

Panevezys

1st Keirin
1st Sprint

2nd Sprint, Fenioux Piste International
2nd 500m Time Trial, Fenioux Trophy Piste
2015
Fenioux Piste International

1st Keirin
1st Sprint

Trofeu CAR Anadia Portugal

1st Sprint
1st 500m Time Trial

Panevezys

1st 500m Time Trial
2nd Sprint

Grand Prix Minsk

1st 500m Time Trial
3rd Keirin
