= Simona Krupeckaitė =

Lithuanian cyclist (born 1982)

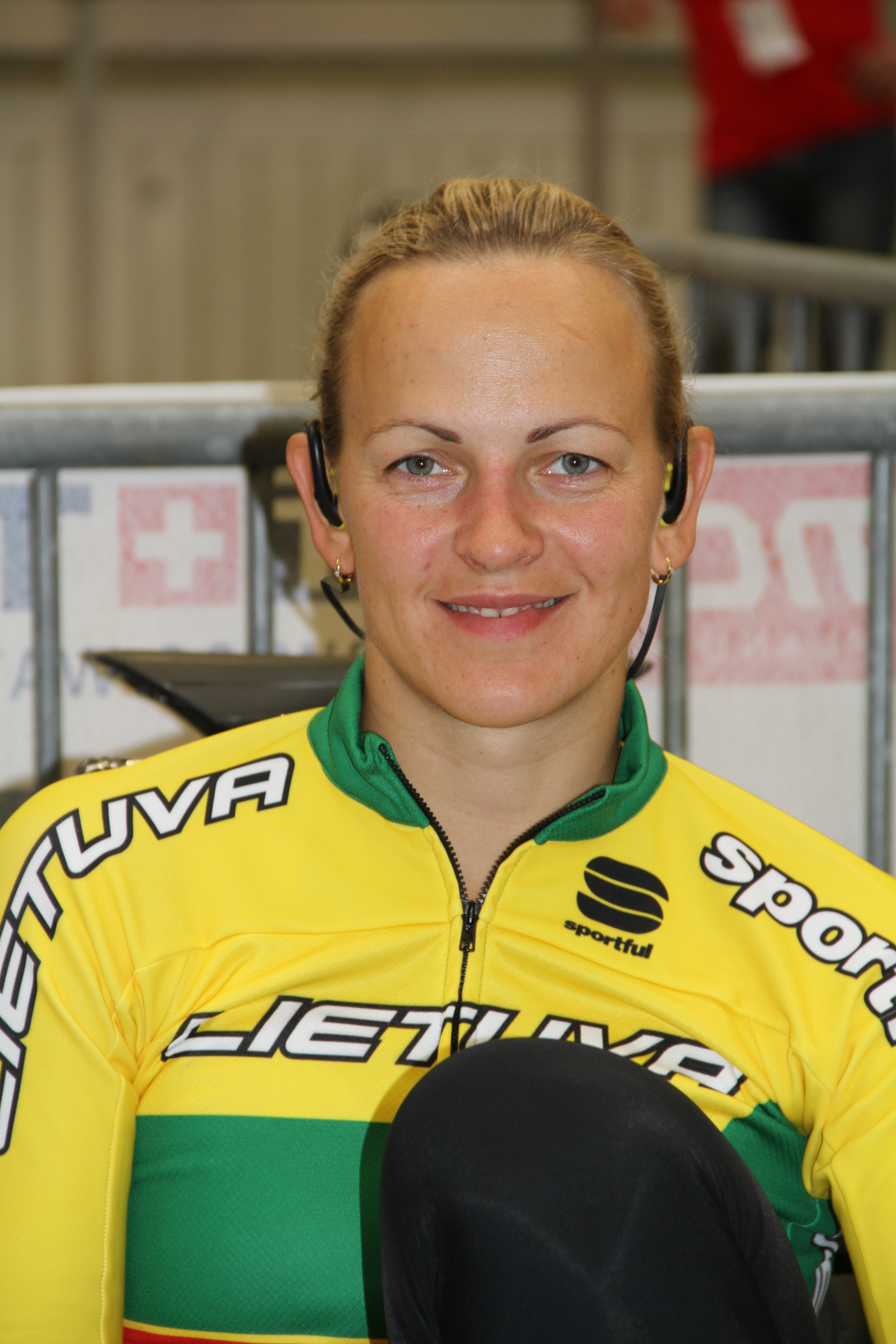
- Krupeckaitė at the 2015 UEC European Track Championships

Personal information
- Born: 13 December 1982 (age 43) Utena, Lithuania
- Height: 1.70 m (5 ft 7 in)
- Weight: 65 kg (143 lb)

Cycling career
- Sport: Cycling
- Discipline: Track cycling
- Role: Rider
- Rider type: Sprinter

Professional teams
- 2004–2005: Aliverti-Bianchi-Kookai
- 2007–2009: Safi-Pasta Zara-Manhattan

Major wins
- Two world records holder * 3× Lithuanian Sportsperson of the Year (2009, 2010, 2016)
Medal record
Women's track cycling
Representing Lithuania
Event	1st	2nd	3rd
World Championships	2	5	6
European Championships	3	2	4
European Games	1	1	0
Total	6	8	10
World Championships
Gold medal – first place	2009 Pruszków	500 m Time Trial
Gold medal – first place	2010 Ballerup	Keirin
Silver medal – second place	2008 Manchester	500 m Time Trial
Silver medal – second place	2008 Manchester	Sprint
Silver medal – second place	2010 Ballerup	500 m Time Trial
Silver medal – second place	2011 Apeldoorn	Sprint
Silver medal – second place	2012 Melbourne	Sprint
Bronze medal – third place	2004 Melbourne	500 m Time Trial
Bronze medal – third place	2009 Pruszków	Sprint
Bronze medal – third place	2009 Pruszków	Team Sprint
Bronze medal – third place	2010 Ballerup	Team Sprint
Bronze medal – third place	2010 Ballerup	Sprint
Bronze medal – third place	2018 Apeldoorn	Keirin
European Championships
Gold medal – first place	2012 Panevėžys	Team sprint
Gold medal – first place	2012 Panevėžys	Keirin
Gold medal – first place	2016 Yvelines	Sprint
Silver medal – second place	2010 Pruszków	Keirin
Silver medal – second place	2017 Berlin	Keirin
Bronze medal – third place	2010 Pruszków	Sprint
Bronze medal – third place	2012 Panevėžys	Sprint
Bronze medal – third place	2016 Yvelines	Team sprint
Bronze medal – third place	2016 Yvelines	Keirin
European Games
Gold medal – first place	2019 Minsk	Keirin
Silver medal – second place	2019 Minsk	Team sprint

Simona Krupeckaitė (born 13 December 1982) is a Lithuanian former professional track cyclist. She is the 2009 500 m Time Trial World Champion and World Record holder at 33.296s, and the 2010 Keirin World Champion. She also won the 2009, 2010 and 2016 Lithuanian Sportsperson of the Year award. In 2010 Krupeckaitė reached one more world record. This time she achieved 10.793 s record at Flying 200 m time trial event. She retired from competition after the conclusion of the 2021 UCI Track Champions League in December of that year.

== Career results ==
2003
2nd 500 m TT, European Track Championships, U23
2nd Sprint, European Track Championships, U23

2004
3rd 500 m TT, UCI Track Cycling World Championships
2004 UCI Track Cycling World Cup Classics

1st Keirin, Round 2, Aguascalientes
3rd Sprint, Round 2, Aguascalientes

2005
2005–2006 UCI Track Cycling World Cup Classics

2nd 500 m TT, Round 1, Moscow

2006
2006–2007 UCI Track Cycling World Cup Classics

2nd 500 m TT, Round 1, Sydney
3rd Sprint, Round 2, Moscow
3rd 500 m TT, Round 2, Moscow

2007
2007–2008 UCI Track Cycling World Cup Classics

2nd 500 m TT, Round 2, Beijing

2008
2nd 500 m TT, UCI Track Cycling World Championships
2nd Sprint, UCI Track Cycling World Championships
2007–2008 UCI Track Cycling World Cup Classics

3rd 500 m TT, Round 3, Los Angeles

2008–2009 UCI Track Cycling World Cup Classics

1st Sprint, Round 3, Cali
1st 500 m TT, Round 3, Cali
1st Keirin, Round 3, Cali
3rd Team Sprint, Round 3, Cali

2009
1st 500 m TT, UCI Track Cycling World Championships, set new World Record
3rd Sprint, UCI Track Cycling World Championships
3rd Team Sprint, UCI Track Cycling World Championships

2008–2009 UCI Track Cycling World Cup Classics

1st 500 m TT, Round 4, Beijing
1st Sprint, Round 4, Beijing
1st Keirin, Round 4, Beijing
2nd Team Sprint, Round 4, Beijing

2009–2010 UCI Track Cycling World Cup Classics

1st Keirin, Round 1, Manchester
3rd Sprint, Round 1, Manchester
1st 500m TT, Round 3, Cali
1st Sprint, Round 3, Cali
2nd Team Sprint, Round 3, Cali

2010
1st Keirin, UCI Track Cycling World Championships
2nd 500 m TT, UCI Track Cycling World Championships
3rd Sprint, UCI Track Cycling World Championships
3rd Team Sprint, UCI Track Cycling World Championships

2011
2nd Sprint, World Track Championships
2010–2011 UCI Track Cycling World Cup Classics

2nd Sprint, Round 3, Beijing
3rd Team Sprint, Round 3, Beijing

2011–2012 UCI Track Cycling World Cup Classics

1st Keirin, Round 2, Cali

2012
2nd Sprint, UCI Track Cycling World Championships
2011–2012 UCI Track Cycling World Cup Classics

2nd Team Sprint, Round 3, Beijing
2nd Sprint, Round 3, Beijing
2nd Keirin, Round 3, Beijing
1st Keirin, Round 4, London

2014
Polish Cup

1st Keirin
1st Sprint

1st Keirin, Grand Prix of Tula
1st Keirin, Japan Track Cup 1
Japan Track Cup 2

1st Keirin
3rd Sprint

2nd Sprint, Panevezys
Memorial of Alexander Lesnikov

3rd Keirin
3rd Sprint

2015
Panevezys

1st Keirin
1st Sprint

Cottbuser SprintCup

1st Keirin
1st Sprint

Grand Prix of Poland

1st Keirin
1st Sprint
1st Team Sprint (with Migle Marozaite)

2nd Keirin, Oberhausen
2015–16 UCI Track Cycling World Cup

3rd Sprint, Round 2, Cambridge

2016
2015–16 UCI Track Cycling World Cup

1st Keirin, Round 3, Hong Kong

2016–17 UCI Track Cycling World Cup

1st Keirin, Round 1, Glasgow
1st Sprint, Round 1, Glasgow

1st Sprint, Grand Prix of Poland
Panevežys

1st Keirin
1st Sprint

Memorial of Alexander Lesnikov

1st Keirin
1st Sprint

Grand Prix of Tula

1st Keirin
1st Sprint

Grand Prix Minsk

1st Sprint
2nd Keirin

2nd Keirin, Oberhausen

2017
International track race – Panevežys

1st Keirin
1st Sprint

2nd Keirin, UEC European Track Championships

2nd Keirin, Troféu Internacional de Anadia

Awards
Preceded by Edvinas Krungolcas	Best Lithuanian sportsman of the Year; 2009, 2010	Succeeded by Laura Asadauskaitė
Preceded by Laura Asadauskaitė	Lithuanian Sportswoman of the Year; 2016	Succeeded by Airinė Palšytė
