= Becky James =

Welsh cyclist (born 1991)

Rebecca James
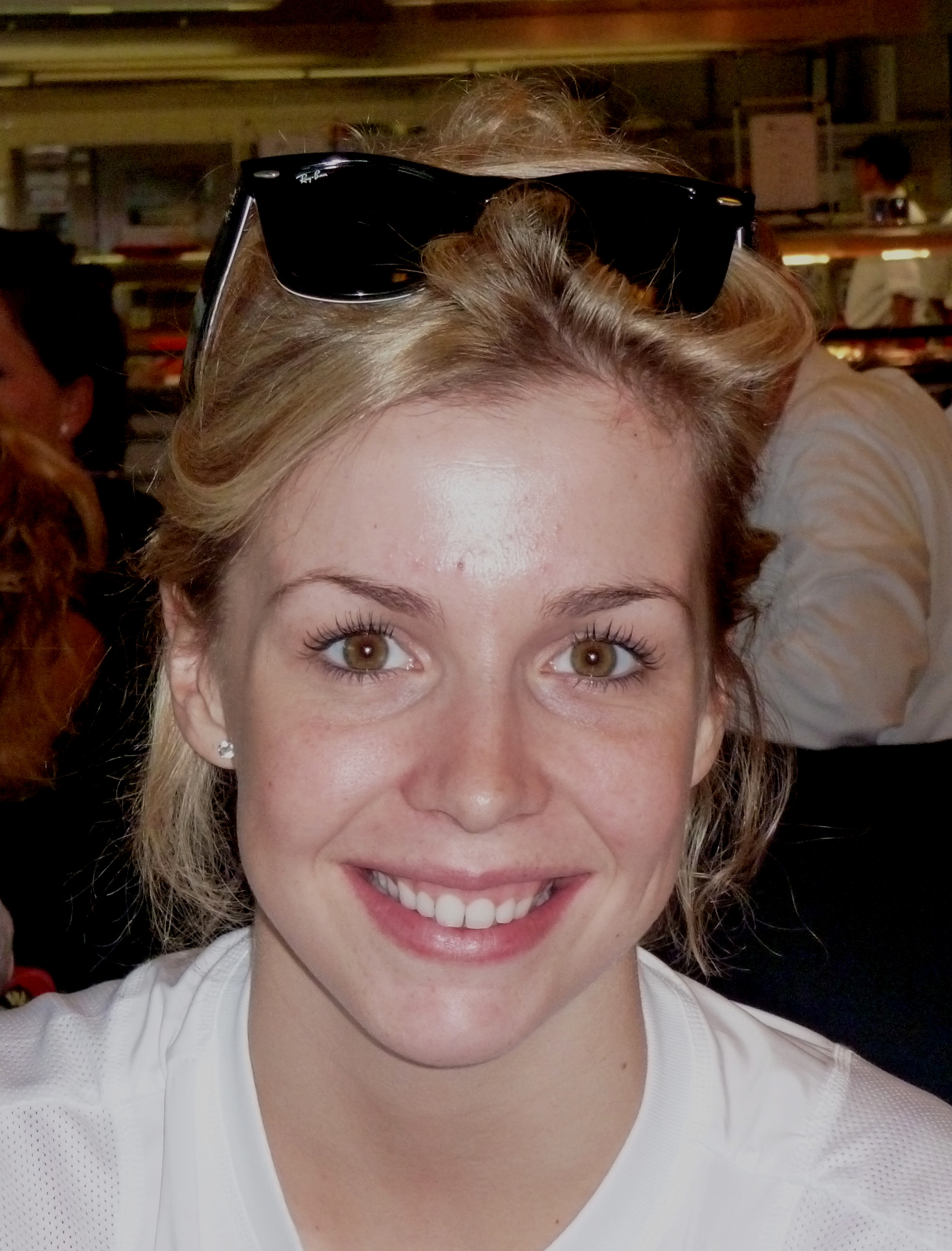
- James in 2012

Personal information
- Full name: Rebecca Angharad James
- Born: 29 November 1991 (age 34) Abergavenny, Monmouthshire, Wales
- Height: 1.71 m (5 ft 7 in)
- Weight: 67 kg (148 lb)

Cycling career
- Sport: Cycling
- Current team: Velosure–Giordana
- Disciplines: Track & Road
- Role: Rider
- Rider type: Sprinter / All-rounder

Amateur team
- Abergavenny Road Club

Professional team
- 2010–: Motorpoint–Marshalls Pasta
Medal record
Representing Great Britain
Olympic Games
| Silver medal – second place | 2016 Rio de Janeiro | Keirin |
| Silver medal – second place | 2016 Rio de Janeiro | Sprint |
World Championships
| Gold medal – first place | 2013 Minsk | Sprint |
| Gold medal – first place | 2013 Minsk | keirin |
| Bronze medal – third place | 2013 Minsk | Team sprint |
| Bronze medal – third place | 2013 Minsk | 500 m time trial |
| Bronze medal – third place | 2014 Cali | Team sprint |
| Bronze medal – third place | 2014 Cali | keirin |
| Bronze medal – third place | 2016 London | keirin |
European Championships
| Bronze medal – third place | 2013 Apeldoorn | Team sprint |
Representing Wales
Commonwealth Games
| Silver medal – second place | 2010 Delhi | Sprint |
| Bronze medal – third place | 2010 Delhi | Time trial |

Rebecca Angharad James (born 29 November 1991) is a Welsh former professional racing cyclist specialising in track cycling. James was the 2013 world sprint and keirin champion. She is a 2016 Rio Olympics double silver medalist.

James rode for Wales and the Great Britain Cycling Team, and rode for the Velosure–Giordana. First spotted by the Welsh Talent Team, she was a member of British Cycling's Olympic Podium Programme.

== Early life ==
James was born in Abergavenny, Monmouthshire. She is the daughter of David James and Christine Harris, and has an older sister, Rachel, who is a racing cyclist, and also has two younger sisters; Ffion and Megan, and a brother, Gareth, who are all keen cyclists. Ffion is a member of the British national mountain bike squad. She attended King Henry VIII School in Abergavenny.

== Career ==
=== Early career ===
James started her cycling career at the Abergavenny Road Club.

In 2011, she stated that the toughest point in her career to date was just before the 2008 European Junior Championships, when she contracted glandular fever and was unable to compete.

In July 2009, James won the gold medal in both the sprint and 500-metre time trial events and the silver in the keirin at the European Track Championships. She followed this up in August by winning the keirin and sprint at the UCI Junior Track Cycling World Championships, and a silver in the 500-metre time trial, as well as setting a new world record for the flying 200 metres. The framed Rainbow Jersey is kept at her home.

Later in 2009, James won the Daily Telegraph-Aviva Sport Matters Female Pupil of the Year award.

=== Professional career ===
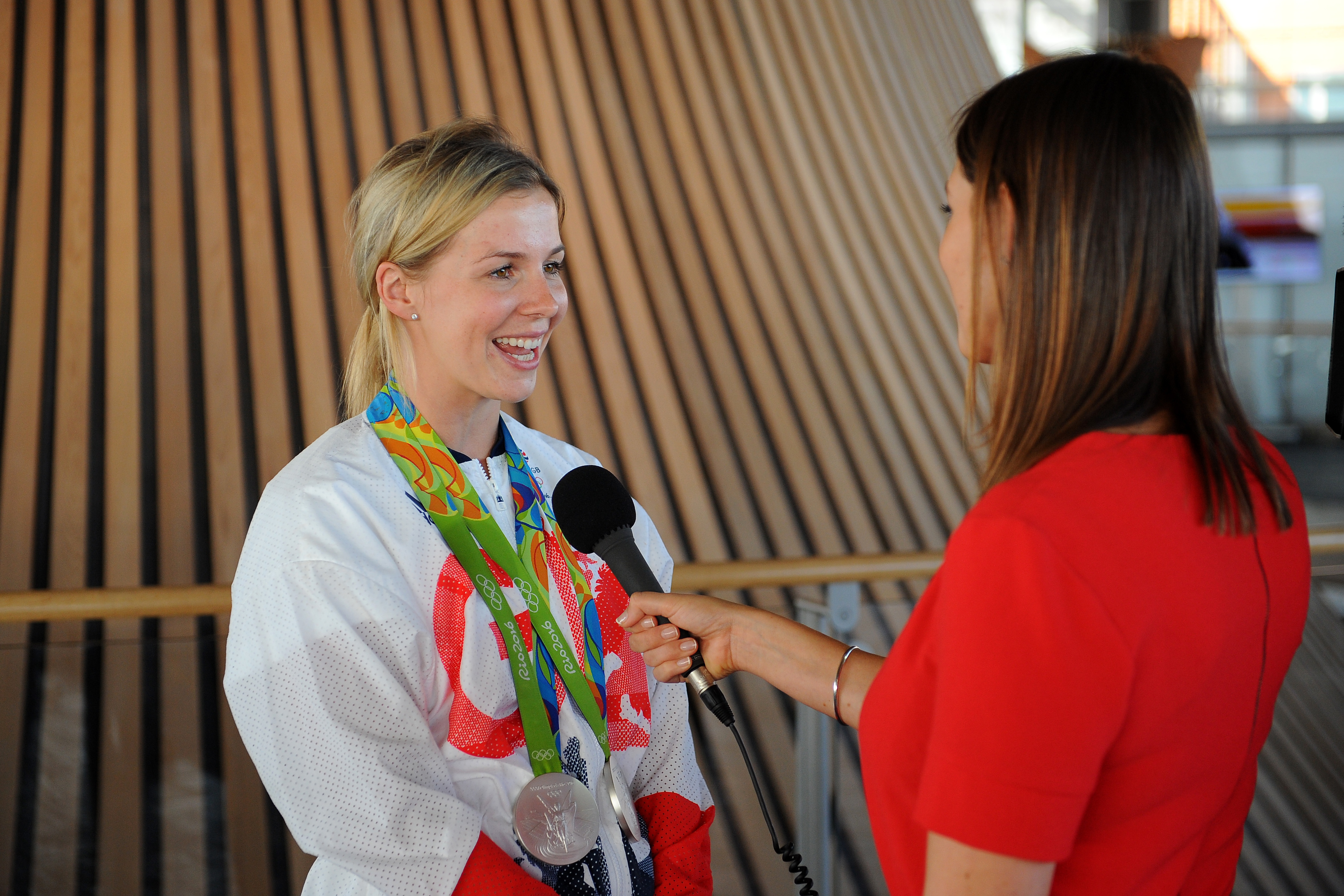
James with her Olympic silver medals

In 2010, at the XIX Commonwealth Games James represented Wales and won the bronze medal in the 500m TT Track race and a silver medal in the Sprint Track race. She was nominated for the 2010 BBC Cymru Wales Sports Personality of the Year, only to lose out to Gareth Bale.

James was under contract from 2011 with the British professional cycling Velosure–Giordana. She was selected for British Cycling's Olympic Development Programme, but was then fast-tracked for the London 2012 Olympic Games.

At the 2013 UCI Championships, James beat Germany's Kristina Vogel 2–1 in the final of the world sprint championship to win her first world gold medal.

James was due to represent Wales at the Commonwealth Games in Glasgow, 2014, but was forced to withdraw due to a knee injury.

At the 2016 Summer Olympics in Rio de Janeiro James won silver medals in both the keirin and the Sprint.

In August 2017, James announced her retirement from cycling to set up a baking business.

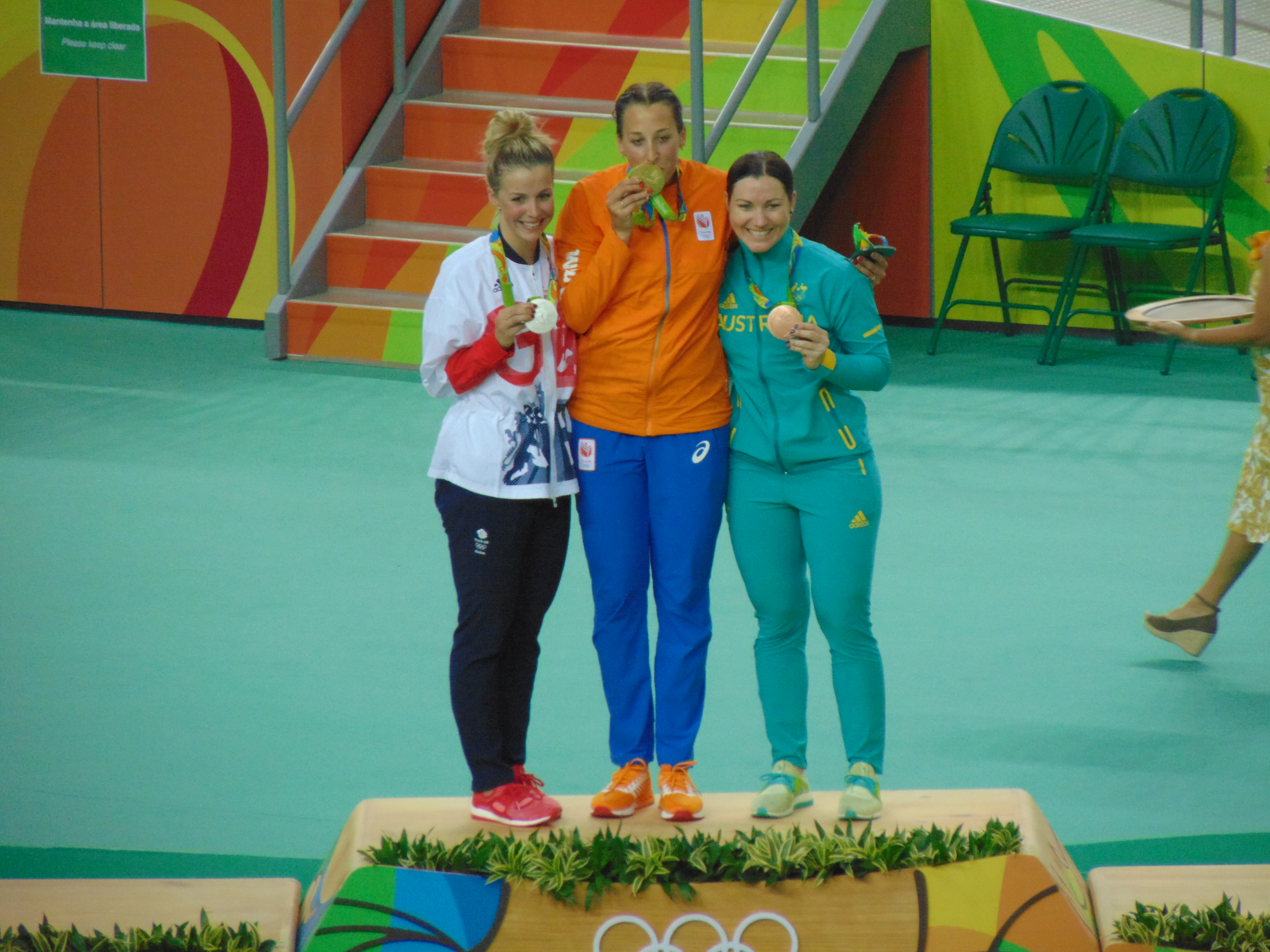
On the podium (left) at the 2016 Summer Olympics

== Personal life ==
James enjoyed horse riding, and competed in show jumping, but no longer participates due to the risks associated interfering with her cycling commitments. James stated for her pre-race rituals that she enjoys Electronic dance music whilst doing her roller warm up. She uses Reggae and Reggae fusion whilst waiting. Her favourite place to ride her bike is Pollença, Mallorca.

Her role models are Sir Chris Hoy and Victoria Pendleton.

In June 2019, James married her long-term partner, the Welsh international rugby union player George North.

On 5 May 2020, the couple announced the birth of their son.

The death was announced of her sister Bethan on Instagram on 23rd October 2026.

== Palmarès ==
2005
3rd Omnium, British National Track Championships – Under 14

2006
1st 500m TT, British National Track Championships – Under 16

2007
1st 500m TT, British National Track Championships – Junior
1st 500m TT, British National Track Championships – Under 16
1st Sprint, British National Track Championships – Under 16
1st Scratch race, British National Track Championships – Under 16
2nd Sprint, British National Track Championships – Junior
3rd British National Cyclo-cross Championships – Junior

2009
1st Keirin, Junior Track World Championships
1st Sprint, Junior Track World Championships
2nd 500m TT, Junior Track World Championships
1st Sprint, European Track Championships
1st 500m TT, European Track Championships
2nd Keirin, European Track Championships
2nd Keirin, British National Track Championships
3rd Sprint, British National Track Championships
3rd 500m TT, British National Track Championships

2010
1st Sprint, European Track Championships, U23
2nd 500m TT, European Track Championships, U23
2nd Team Sprint, European Track Championships, U23 (with Victoria Williamson)
3rd 500m TT, Commonwealth Games
2nd Sprint Commonwealth Games
2nd 500m TT, British National Track Championships
2nd Sprint, British National Track Championships

2011
3rd Keirin, Round 3, UCI Track World Cup, Beijing
3rd Sprint, GP von Deutschland im Sprint
2nd 500m TT, European Track Championships, U23
1st Keirin, British National Track Championships
1st Sprint, British National Track Championships
2nd 500m TT, British National Track Championships

2012
2nd Team Sprint, European Track Championships, U23
3rd Sprint, European Track Championships, U23
3rd Keirin, European Track Championships, U23
1st Team Sprint, Round 1, UCI Track World Cup, Cali (with Jess Varnish)
2nd Sprint, Round 1, UCI Track World Cup, Cali
1st Team Sprint, Round 2, UCI Track World Cup, Glasgow (with Jess Varnish)
3rd Sprint, Round 2, UCI Track World Cup, Glasgow
1st Keirin, British National Track Championships
1st Sprint, British National Track Championships
1st 500m TT, British National Track Championships
1st Team sprint, British National Track Championships (with Rachel James)

2013
UCI Track World Championships

1st Sprint
1st Keirin
3rd 500m time trial
3rd Team sprint (with Victoria Williamson)

1st 500 m time trial, UCI Track Cycling World Ranking
2nd Sprint, Revolution – Round 1, Manchester
3rd Team sprint, UEC European U23 Track Championships (with Victoria Williamson)

2014
Revolution

1st Keirin – Round 4, Manchester
3rd Sprint – Round 4, Manchester

UCI Track World Championships

3rd Team sprint (with Jessica Varnish)
3rd Keirin

2015
2nd Sprint, British National Track Championships
2nd Keirin, British National Track Championships
3rd Keirin, Open des Nations sur Piste de Roubaix
2016
2nd Sprint, Dudenhofen
2nd Sprint, Öschelbronn
3rd Keirin, Oberhausen
2nd Keirin, Olympic Games, Rio De Janeiro, Brazil
2nd Sprint, Olympic Games, Rio De Janeiro, Brazil
