= Ekaterina Gnidenko =

Russian cyclist (born 1992)

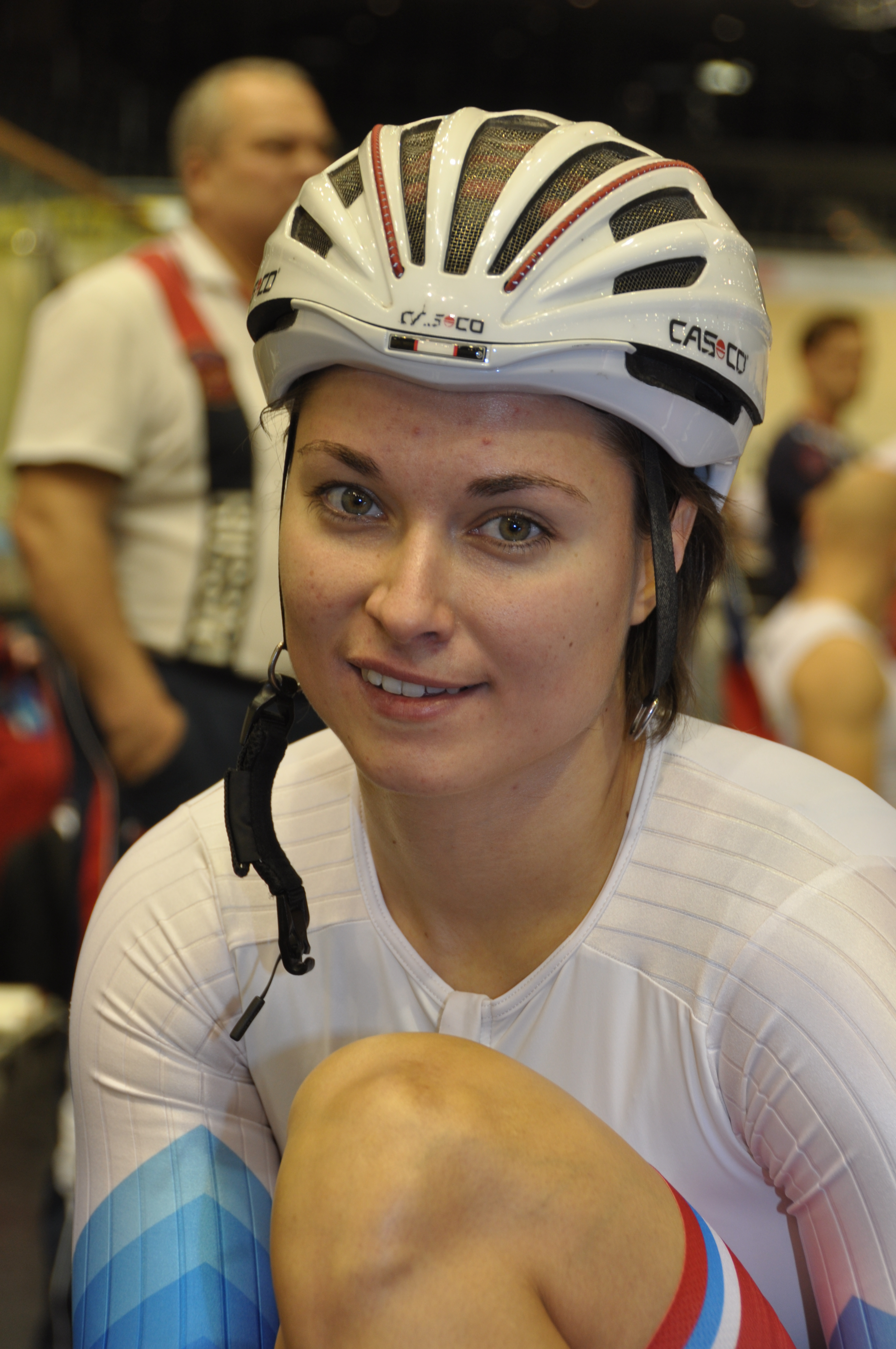
- Gnidenko in 2018

Personal information
- Born: 11 December 1992 (age 33) Tula, Russia
Medal record
Women's track cycling
Representing Russia
European Championships
Silver medal – second place	2012 Panevėžys	Keirin

Ekaterina Valeryevna Gnidenko (Russian: Екатерина Валерьевна Гниденко; born 11 December 1992 in Tula) is a Russian track cyclist. At the 2012 Summer Olympics, she competed in the Women's sprint but was subsequently found to have been using turinabol a banned product and was disqualified.

Gnidenko later appealed her disqualification to the Court of Arbitration for Sport (CAS), seeking to have her disqualification from the 2012 Olympics overturned. On 26 July 2018, the CAS dismissed Gnidenko's appeal, upholding her disqualification.

== Career results ==
2011
UEC European U23 Track Championships

2nd Team Sprint (with Elena Brejniva)
3rd Sprint

2013
Grand Prix of Russian Helicopters

1st Team Sprint (with Olga Streltsova)
2nd Keirin

2nd Team Sprint, UEC European U23 Track Championships (with Anastasia Voynova)
2014
Grand Prix of Tula

1st Sprint
1st Team Sprint (with Anastasia Voynova)
2nd Keirin
3rd 500m Time Trial

1st Keirin, Grand Prix of Russian Helicopters
2015
Grand Prix Minsk

1st Keirin
3rd 500m Time Trial

Grand Prix of Tula

2nd Sprint
2nd Team Sprint (with Tatiana Kiseleva)

2nd Keirin, Cottbuser SprintCup
3rd Keirin, UEC European Track Championships
2016
Grand Prix Minsk

1st Keirin
3rd 500m Time Trial

Memorial of Alexander Lesnikov

2nd Team Sprint (with Tatiana Kiseleva)
3rd Keirin
3rd Sprint

Grand Prix of Tula

2nd Sprint
2nd Team Sprint (with Tatiana Kiseleva)
